= 2018 NPF transactions =

The following is a list 2018 NPF transactions that have occurred in the National Pro Fastpitch softball league since the completion of the 2017 season and during the 2018 season. It lists which team each player has been traded to, signed by, or claimed by, and for which player(s) or draft pick (s), if applicable. Players who have retired are also listed. Per Commissioner Cheri Kempf's tweet, NPF contracts expire in February, therefore the extension of a contract "through 2028" means the player is only contracted to play through the 2027 season, with the contract expiring the following February. "Thru 2028 season" therefore would mean a contract that expires in February 2029, covering only games played in 2028.

== Transactions ==
Source:Any transactions listed below without a reference were originally announced on NPF's transactions page^{[usurped]}

Date	Player	Team	Type	Details/Ref
04/24/2018	Jordan Taylor	Aussie Spirit	Trade	Pride trade Jordan Taylor to Spirit in exchange for their first pick (#3 overall) in the 1st round of the 2019 NPF draft
04/20/2018	Angel Bunner	Beijing Shougang Eagles	Trade	Pride trade Angel Bunner to Eagles in exchange for their first pick (#2 overall) in the 1st round of the 2019 NPF Draft
02/15/2018	Sahvanna Jaquish	USSSA Florida Pride	Signing	Sahvanna Jaquish signs with Pride thru 2020 season
02/14/2017	Jailyn Ford	Cleveland Comets	Franchise player tag	Comets place franchise player tag on Jailyn Ford
02/14/2017	Rachele Fico	Cleveland Comets	Franchise player tag	Comets place franchise player tag on Rachele Fico
02/14/2018	Kirsti Merritt	USSSA Florida Pride	Extension	Kirsti Merritt extends contract with Pride thru 2020 season
02/13/2018	Kelsey Nunley	USSSA Florida Pride	Extension	Kelsey Nunley extends contract with Pride thru 2020 season
02/13/2018	Shelby Pendley	USSSA Florida Pride	Extension	Shelby Pendley extends contract with Pride thru 2018 season
02/13/2018	Lauren Chamberlain	USSSA Florida Pride	Extension	Lauren Chamberlain extends contract with Pride thru 2018 season
02/13/2018	Courtney Ceo	USSSA Florida Pride	Retirement	Courtney Ceo retires from National Pro Fastpitch
01/29/2018	Kaia Parnaby	Aussie Spirit	Trade	Spirit trade 1st round draft pick (#1 overall) in the 2018 NPF draft to Bandits in exchange for Kaia Parnaby
01/25/2018	Sahvanna Jaquish	USSSA Florida Pride	Trade	Bandits trade Sahvanna Jaquish to Pride in exchange for $3000
01/22/2018	Stacy May-Johnson	Chicago Bandits	Extension	Stacy May-Johnson extends contract with Bandits thru 2018 season
01/17/2018	Nadia Taylor	Chicago Bandits	Signing	Nadia Taylor signs with Bandits thru 2018 season
01/17/2018	Kristen Brown	Chicago Bandits	Extension	Kristen Brown extends contract with Bandits thru 2018 season
01/17/2018	Ellen Roberts	Chicago Bandits	Release	Ellen Roberts released from Bandits
01/12/2017	Morgan Melloh	Scrap Yard Dawgs	Franchise player tag	Dawgs place franchise player tag on Morgan Melloh
01/12/2017	Sahvanna Jaquish	Chicago Bandits	Franchise player tag	Bandits place franchise player tag on Sahvanna Jaquish
01/12/2018	Taylor Gadbois	Texas Charge	Retirement	Taylor Gadbois retires from National Pro Fastpitch
01/12/2018	Ally Carda	Chicago Bandits	Signing	Ally Carda signs with Bandits thru 2018 season
01/04/2018	Breanna Wonderly	Chicago Bandits	Release	Breanna Wonderly released from Bandits
01/04/2018	Brittany Gomez	Texas Charge	Retirement	Brittany Gomez retires from National Pro Fastpitch
12/04/2017	Lacey Waldrop	Chicago Bandits	Extension	Lacey Waldrop extends contract with Bandits thru 2018 season
11/29/2017	Coley Ries	Chicago Bandits	Signing	Coley Ries signs with Bandits thru 2018 season
11/28/2017	Natalie Hernandez	Chicago Bandits	Extension	Natalie Hernandez extends contract with Bandits thru 2018 season
11/21/2017	Kristyn Sandberg	Chicago Bandits	Signing	Kristyn Sandberg signs with Bandits thru 2018 season
11/21/2017	Sashel Palacios	Chicago Bandits	Signing	Sashel Palacios signs with Bandits thru 2018 season
11/10/2017	Kaylyn Castillo		Retirement	Kaylyn Castillo retires from National Pro Fastpitch
11/05/2017	Rachel Lack	Chicago Bandits	Release	Rachel Lack released from Bandits
11/05/2017	Stacey McManus	Chicago Bandits	Release	Stacey McManus released from Bandits
11/05/2017	Samantha Poole	Chicago Bandits	Release	Samantha Poole released from Bandits
11/05/2017	Taylayh Tsitsikronis	Chicago Bandits	Release	Taylayh Tsitsikronis released from Bandits
10/19/2017	Bailey Landry	Scrap Yard Dawgs	Signing	Bailey Landry signs with Dawgs thru 2021 season
10/19/2017	Lauren Haeger	Scrap Yard Dawgs	Signing	Lauren Haeger signs with Dawgs thru 2021 season
10/17/2017	Danielle O'Toole	Chicago Bandits	Extension	Danielle O'Toole extends contract with Bandits thru 2018 season
10/16/2017	Abby Ramirez	Chicago Bandits	Extension	Abby Ramirez extends contract with Bandits thru 2018 season
10/13/2017	Meagan May Whitley	Scrap Yard Dawgs	Release	Meagan May Whitley released from Dawgs
10/13/2017	Emilee Koerner	Scrap Yard Dawgs	Release	Emilee Koerner released from Dawgs
10/12/2017	Mysha Sataraka	Texas Charge	Free Agency	Mysha Sataraka granted free agency upon dissolution of charge
10/12/2017	Kristyn Sandberg	Texas Charge	Free Agency	Kristyn Sandberg granted free agency upon dissolution of charge
10/12/2017	Kelsey Stewart	Texas Charge	Free Agency	Kelsey Stewart granted free agency upon dissolution of charge
10/12/2017	Nadia Taylor	Texas Charge	Free Agency	Nadia Taylor granted free agency upon dissolution of charge
10/12/2017	Missy Taukeiaho	Texas Charge	Free Agency	Missy Taukeiaho granted free agency upon dissolution of charge
10/12/2017	Emily Vincent	Texas Charge	Free Agency	Emily Vincent granted free agency upon dissolution of charge
10/12/2017	Breja'e Washington	Texas Charge	Free Agency	Breja'e Washington granted free agency upon dissolution of charge
10/12/2017	Halie McCleney	Texas Charge	Free Agency	Halie McCleney granted free agency upon dissolution of charge
10/12/2017	Mandy Ogle	Texas Charge	Free Agency	Mandy Ogle granted free agency upon dissolution of charge
10/12/2017	Haley Outon	Texas Charge	Free Agency	Haley Outon granted free agency upon dissolution of charge
10/12/2017	Coley Ries	Texas Charge	Free Agency	Coley Ries granted free agency upon dissolution of charge
10/12/2017	Ruby Rivera	Texas Charge	Free Agency	Ruby Rivera granted free agency upon dissolution of charge
10/12/2017	Kelsee Selman-Rowe	Texas Charge	Free Agency	Kelsee Selman-Rowe granted free agency upon dissolution of charge
10/12/2017	Brittany Gomez	Texas Charge	Free Agency	Brittany Gomez granted free agency upon dissolution of charge
10/12/2017	Delanie Gourley	Texas Charge	Free Agency	Delanie Gourley granted free agency upon dissolution of charge
10/12/2017	Lauren Haeger	Texas Charge	Free Agency	Lauren Haeger granted free agency upon dissolution of charge
10/12/2017	Kylee Lahners	Texas Charge	Free Agency	Kylee Lahners granted free agency upon dissolution of charge
10/12/2017	Bailey Landry	Texas Charge	Free Agency	Bailey Landry granted free agency upon dissolution of charge
10/12/2017	Brittany Mack-Oakes	Texas Charge	Free Agency	Brittany Mack-Oakes granted free agency upon dissolution of charge
10/12/2017	Ally Carda	Texas Charge	Free Agency	Ally Carda granted free agency upon dissolution of charge
10/12/2017	Jill Compton	Texas Charge	Free Agency	Jill Compton granted free agency upon dissolution of charge
10/12/2017	Koral Costa	Texas Charge	Free Agency	Koral Costa granted free agency upon dissolution of charge
10/12/2017	Renada Davis	Texas Charge	Free Agency	Renada Davis granted free agency upon dissolution of charge
10/12/2017	Dallas Escobedo	Texas Charge	Free Agency	Dallas Escobedo granted free agency upon dissolution of charge
10/12/2017	Taylor Gadbois	Texas Charge	Free Agency	Taylor Gadbois granted free agency upon dissolution of charge
10/12/2017	Alisa Goler	Texas Charge	Free Agency	Alisa Goler granted free agency upon dissolution of charge
10/10/2017	Emily Crane	Chicago Bandits	Extension	Emily Crane extends contract with Bandits thru 2018 season
10/05/2017	Sierra Hyland	Chicago Bandits	Extension	Sierra Hyland extends contract with Bandits thru 2018 season
10/04/2017	Shelby Turnier	Chicago Bandits	Extension	Shelby Turnier extends contract with Bandits thru 2018 season
10/03/2017	Delaney Spaulding	Chicago Bandits	Signing	Delaney Spaulding signs with Bandits thru 2018 season
10/02/2017	Haylie Wagner	Chicago Bandits	Extension	Haylie Wagner extends contract with Bandits thru 2019 season
09/29/2017	Emily Carosone	Chicago Bandits	Extension	Emily Carosone extends contract with Bandits thru 2019 season
09/29/2017	Taylore Fuller	Chicago Bandits	Release	Taylore Fuller released from Bandits
09/27/2017	Courtney Gano	Chicago Bandits	Signing	Courtney Gano signs with Bandits thru 2018 season
09/26/2017	Megan Blank	Chicago Bandits	Extension	Megan Blank extends contract with Bandits thru 2018 season
09/25/2017	Sammy Marshall	Chicago Bandits	Extension	Sammy Marshall extends contract with Bandits thru 2018 season
09/19/2017	Brenna Moss	Chicago Bandits	Extension	Brenna Moss extends contract with Bandits thru 2020 season
