= 2017 National Pro Fastpitch season =

2017 NPF Season
- League: National Pro Fastpitch
- Sport: softball
- Duration: June 1, 2017 – August 20, 2017
- Teams: 6

2017 NPF Draft
- Top draft pick: Jessica Burroughs P FSU
- Picked by: USSSA Pride

Regular Season
- Regular Season Championship Cup: USSSA Pride
- Player of the Year: Kelly Kretschman; USSSA Pride
- Offensive Player of the Year: Kelly Kretschman; USSSA Pride
- Pitcher of the Year: Monica Abbott; Scrap Yard Dawgs
- Gold Glove Award: Chelsea Goodacre; USSSA Pride

Cowles Cup
- Champions: Scrap Yard Dawgs
- Runners-up: USSSA Pride
- Finals MVP: Monica Abbott Scrap Yard Dawgs

NPF seasons
- 2016 2018

The 2017 National Pro Fastpitch season was the 14th season of professional softball under the name National Pro Fastpitch (NPF) for the only professional women's softball league in the United States. From 1997 to 2002, NPF operated under the names Women's Pro Fastpitch (WPF) and Women's Pro Softball League (WPSL). Each year, the playoff teams battle for the Cowles Cup.

== Milestones and events ==
The Dallas Charge announced that they would be relocating to San Marcos, Texas and changing their name to the Texas Charge.

On January 16, 2017, the NPF announced that the ownership of the Pennsylvania Rebellion would be dissolving the team, effective immediately. All Rebellion players under contract were granted free agency.

On February 1, the Village of Rosemont announced it would be assuming ownership of the Bandits from previous owner Bill Sokolis. The transaction included a $50,000 licensing fee paid to the NPF. Rosemont employee Toni Calmeyn will take over as general manager and will hire a new head coach.

Later in February Softball Australia and NPF announced an agreement that will allow at least eight players from the Australia women's national softball team to play for the Bandits. This will increase the NPF's international profile, and allow the Australian players to compete against top-level talent.

On May 2, 2017, NPF announced the addition of an expansion team, Beijing Shougang Eagles. Its roster is to be populated with members of China women's national softball team and selected American players. For 2017, the home half Beijing's schedule will be played in the home venues of the other NPF teams. Beijing is expected to announce a permanent US home location in the future.

At the Pride's first home game at Space Coast Stadium, they announced that legendary pitcher Cat Osterman's jersey number 8 had been retired, commemorating it with a banner on the outfield fence.

On July 26, Brittany Mack-Oakes threw a no-hitter, beating the Eagles 6-1.

Monica Abbott threw the first no-hitter in Scrap Yard Dawgs' history on August 2, striking out 18. It was her fourth professional no-hitter.

=== Rule changes ===
NPF held its annual winter meetings in Nashville from January 18–20, 2016. The following announcements were released after the meetings:

- Rosters were increased from a maximum of 23 players to 26. However, only 23 of those on the roster can be active for a game.
- Team salary caps were increased from $150,000/team to $175,000. NPF clarified that only the amount paid to a player counts against the salary cap, eliminating "signing bonus[es], performance incentives, improved living conditions, et al."
- The player minimum salary going forward is $3000.
- Teams that have tagged an athlete with the Franchise Player Tag are allowed to negotiate beyond the established player value.
- Extended a team's rights to retired player to permanent.
- Clarified that a player who retires must spend at least one full season out of NPF.
- A player's minimum age requirement was changed from 21 on January 1 of the season's calendar year to 21 at the time of the game.
- Removed the minimum amount for travel expenses.
- Banned the use of bats that are not on an official list of NPF suppliers.
- Previously, NPF pitching rules mirrored the NCAA rules. Going forward, they are to follow World Baseball Softball Confederation rules.
- Previously, the penalties for an illegal pitch were a ball added to the batter's count and advancing baserunners one base. Beginning in 2017, the penalty is only the ball added to the count.
- Player autograph sessions will continue in 2017, but teams must to make player safety a priority. Sessions were suspended briefly in 2016 due to concerns about player safety.
- The 8th inning tie-breaker rule for doubleheaders previously applied to scheduled doubleheaders. In 2017, the rule will apply to all doubleheaders, including makeup doubleheaders.

== Teams, cities and stadiums ==
Team	City	Stadium	Coaches
Akron Racers	Akron, Ohio	Firestone Stadium	Head Coach: Charlotte Morgan; Assistants: Alison Owen
Beijing Shougang Eagles	Various	Various	Head Coach: Teresa Wilson; Assistants: Breanne Lewis, Thomas Hazelhurst
Chicago Bandits	Rosemont, Illinois (Chicago Area)	Ballpark at Rosemont	Head Coach: Sharonda McDonald; Assistant: Kyla Holas, Annie Smith
Texas Charge	San Marcos, Texas	Bobcat Softball Stadium	Head Coach: Roman Foore; Assistant: Jessica Rogers, Penny Foore
Scrap Yard Dawgs	Woodlands, TX (Houston Area)	Scrap Yard Sports Complex	Head Coach: Gerry Glasco; Assistants: Jimmy Kolaitis, Joe Guthrie
USSSA Florida Pride	Melbourne, Florida	Space Coast Stadium	Head Coach: Lonni Alameda; Assistants: Travis Wilson, Craig Snider

National Pro Fastpitch teams

== Player acquisition ==
=== College draft ===
The 2017 NPF College Draft will be the 14th annual collegiate draft for NPF.

=== Notable transactions ===
- Head Coaching Changes
  - The Charge hired three-time Olympian Crystl Bustos to be their head coach. Arizona State assistant coach Roman Foore was hired as assistant coach.
  - In July the Charge replaced Crystl Bustos with Roman Foore as head coach.
  - The Dawgs hired Texas A&M associate head coach Gerry Glasco as their head coach. Glasco's assistants will be Oregon's Jimmy Kolaitis and Joe Guthrie of Bucknell.
  - Bandits head coach Mike Steuerwald stepped down and became assistant general manager of the Scrap Yard Dawgs.
  - In February the Bandits hired University of Florida assistant coach Sharonda McDonald as their head coach. McDonald was an All-NPF player, playing with the Philadelphia Force in 2007 and 2008, the Racers from 2010–12, and 2014 with the Pride. Later, Chicago hired as their assistant coach Kyla Holas, who coached University of Houston from 1999-2016. On June 8, the Bandits announced the hiring of Grinnell College alumna Annie Smith as assistant coach.
  - The Racers hired two new assistant coaches, former Racers players Charlotte Morgan and Alison Owen.
  - At a press conference in Beijing, the Eagles announced that Teresa Wilson would be their first head coach, with assistants Breanne Lewis and Thomas Hazelhurst. Wilson had previously coached in the NCAA for 24 years and coached in the NPF in 2012 with the Carolina Diamonds.
  - Citing a desire to focus on his position as coach of the Belmont Bruins softball team, Brian Levin stepped down as the Racers' head coach Assistant coach Charlotte Morgan was promoted to replace him.

The Dallas Charge hired Scott Smith as their general manager. Smith is the founder of the Texas Bombers, a softball organization with hundreds of players nationwide.

USSSA purchased Space Coast Stadium and announced renovations to make it a center for amateur softball and baseball with 15 fields. The Pride announced it would be their new home stadium, beginning in 2017.

The Pride announced that former player and assistant coach Megan Willis was promoted to assistant general manager.

== League standings ==
Team	GP	W	L	Pct.	GB
USSSA Pride	49	40	9	.816	-
Scrap Yard Dawgs	49	31	18	.633	9
Akron Racers	50	26	24	.520	14.5
Chicago Bandits	49	25	24	.510	15.0
Texas Charge	50	22	28	.440	18.5
Beijing Shougang Eagles	47	3	44	.064	36.0

=== Results table ===
2017 NPF Records
Team	Racers	Eagles	Bandits	Dawgs	Charge	Pride
Akron Racers	—	10-0	5-5	4-6	6-4	1-9
Beijing Shougang Eagles	0-10	—	0-9	0-9	2-8	1-8
Chicago Bandits	5-5	9-0	—	3-7	6-4	2-8
Scrap Yard Dawgs	6-4	9-0	7-3	—	7-3	2-8
Texas Charge	4-6	8-2	4-6	3-7	—	3-7
USSSA Florida Pride	9-1	8-1	8-2	8-2	7-3	—

Legend
	Protest/Halted Game
	Postponement
**Bold**	Winning team

=== 2017 Game log ===
June

Date	Time	Visitor	Home	Venue	Score	Win	Loss	Save	Player of the Game	Attendance
Jun. 01	8:05 PM ET	Akron Racers (0-1)	**Chicago Bandits** (1-0)	Ballpark at Rosemont - Rosemont, IL	2-3	Haylie Wagner (1-0)	Alexis Silkwood (0-1)	-	Emily Carsone	857
Jun. 02	8:35 PM ET	Akron Racers (0-2)	**Chicago Bandits** (2-0)	Ballpark at Rosemont - Rosemont, IL	4-9	Haylie Wagner (2-0)	Sara Groenewegen (0-1)	-	Stacy May-Johnson	1114
Jun. 03	8:35 PM ET	**Akron Racers** (1-2)	Chicago Bandits (2-1)	Ballpark at Rosemont - Rosemont, IL	7-5	Alexis Silkwood (1-1)	Ellen Roberts (0-1)	Sara Groenewegen S(1)	Nicole Schroeder	1046
Jun. 06	12:05 PM ET	Beijing Shougang Eagles (0-1)	**Chicago Bandits** (3-1)	Ballpark at Rosemont - Rosemont, IL	0-1	Haylie Wagner (3-0)	Wang Lan (0-1)	Ellen Roberts S(1)	Sammy Marshall	218
Jun. 07	8:05 PM ET	Beijing Shougang Eagles (0-2)	**Chicago Bandits** (4-1)	Ballpark at Rosemont - Rosemont, IL	0-7	Shelby Turnier (1-0)	Li Qi (0-1)	-	Sammy Marshall	222
Jun. 08	7:05 PM ET	**Akron Racers** (2-2)	USSSA Florida Pride (0-1)	Space Coast Stadium - Viera, Florida	6-4	Rachele Fico (1-0)	Jolene Henderson (0-1)	-	Alex Hugo	840
Jun. 08	8:05 PM ET	Scrap Yard Dawgs (0-1)	**Texas Charge** (1-0)	Bobcat Softball Stadium (Texas State) - San Marcos, TX	0-3	Ally Carda (1-0)	Morgan Melloh (0-1)	Dallas Escobedo S(1)	Nadia Taylor	768
Jun. 08	8:05 PM ET	Beijing Shougang Eagles (0-3)	**Chicago Bandits** (5-1)	Ballpark at Rosemont - Rosemont, IL	2-3	Haylie Wagner (4-0)	Feng Qian Wen (0-1)	-	Brenna Moss	230
Jun. 09	7:05 PM ET	Akron Racers (2-3)	**USSSA Florida Pride** (1-1)	Space Coast Stadium - Viera, Florida	4-6	Kelsey Nunley (1-0)	Emily Weiman (0-1)	Jordan Taylor S(1)	Andrea Duran	532
Jun. 09	8:05 PM ET	**Scrap Yard Dawgs** (1-1)	Texas Charge (1-1)	Bobcat Softball Stadium (Texas State) - San Marcos, TX	9-4	Monica Abbott (1-0)	Lauren Haeger (0-1)	Cheridan Hawkins S(1)	Taylor Edwards	236
Jun. 09	8:35 PM ET	Beijing Shougang Eagles (0-4)	**Chicago Bandits** (6-1)	Ballpark at Rosemont - Rosemont, IL	3-13	Haylie Wagner (5-0)	Wang Lan (0-2)	-	Emily Carosone	711
Jun. 10	7:05 PM ET	Akron Racers (2-4)	**USSSA Florida Pride** (2-1)	Space Coast Stadium - Viera, Florida	1-3	Keilani Ricketts (1-0)	Sara Groenewegen (0-2)	-	Keilani Ricketts	654
Jun. 10	8:05 PM ET	**Texas Charge** (2-1)	Scrap Yard Dawgs (1-2)	Scrap Yard Sports Complex - Woodlands, TX	3-1	Ally Carda (2-0)	Sara Plourde (0-1)	Lauren Haeger S(1)	Ally Carda	1076
Jun. 11	2:05 PM ET DH	Texas Charge (2-2)	**Scrap Yard Dawgs** (2-2)	Scrap Yard Sports Complex - Conroe, TX	4-5	Morgan Melloh (1-1)	Dallas Escobedo (0-1)	Monica Abbott S(1)	Britt Vonk	
Jun. 11	5:05 PM ET DH	Texas Charge (2-3)	**Scrap Yard Dawgs** (3-2)	Scrap Yard Sports Complex - Conroe, TX	0-4	Monica Abbott (2-0)	Jill Compton (0-1)	-	Monica Abbott	306
Jun. 11	7:05 PM ET	Chicago Bandits (6-2)	**USSSA Florida Pride** (3-1)	JoAnne Graf Field at the Seminole Softball Complex - Tallahassee, FL	3-4, 8 innings	Jordan Taylor (1-0)	Ellen Roberts (0-2)	-	Sydney Broderick	269
Jun. 12	7:05 PM ET	Chicago Bandits (6-3)	**USSSA Florida Pride** (4-1)	JoAnne Graf Field at the Seminole Softball Complex - Tallahassee, FL	1-11	Kelsey Nunley (2-0)	Shelby Turnier (1-1)	-	Sierra Romero	243
Jun. 13	7:05 PM ET	Chicago Bandits (6-4)	**USSSA Florida Pride** (5-1)	JoAnne Graf Field at the Seminole Softball Complex - Tallahassee, FL	0-3	Keilani Ricketts (2-0)	Haylie Wagner (5-1)	Jordan Taylor S(2)	Keilani Ricketts	183
Jun. 13	8:05 PM ET	**Akron Racers** (3-4)	Scrap Yard Dawgs (3-3)	Scrap Yard Sports Complex - Woodlands, TX	9-3	Alexis Silkwood (2-1)	Miranda Kramer (0-1)	-	Kristen Wyckoff	157
Jun. 13	8:05 PM ET	**Texas Charge** (3-3)	Beijing Shougang Eagles (0-5)	Ballpark at Rosemont - Rosemont, IL	1-0	Dallas Escobedo (1-1)	Wang Lan (0-3)	-	Dallas Escobedo	14
Jun. 14	4:05 PM ET DH	Texas Charge	Beijing Shougang Eagles	Ballpark at Rosemont - Rosemont, IL	**Suspended in 3rd inning(Inclement weather)**(Resumed on July 23)					
Jun. 14	8:05 PM ET	Akron Racers (3-5)	**Scrap Yard Dawgs** (4-3)	Scrap Yard Sports Complex - Woodlands, TX	1-9	Monica Abbott (3-0)	Sara Groenewegen (0-3)	-	Nerissa Myers	144
Jun. 14	8:05 PM ET DH	Texas Charge	Chicago Bandits	Ballpark at Rosemont - Rosemont, IL	**Postponed (Inclement weather)**(Makeup date:Aug. 09)					
Jun. 15	4:05 PM ET DH	**Texas Charge** (4-3)	Beijing Shougang Eagles (0-6)	Ballpark at Rosemont - Rosemont, IL	7-1	Jill Compton (1-1)	Li Qi (0-2)	-	Jill Compton	30
Jun. 15	8:05 PM ET	**Akron Racers** (4-5)	Scrap Yard Dawgs (4-4)	Scrap Yard Sports Complex - Woodlands, TX	6-2	Jailyn Ford (1-0)	Cheridan Hawkins (0-1)	-	Jailyn Ford	173
Jun. 15	8:05 PM ET DH	Texas Charge (4-4)	**Chicago Bandits** (7-4)	Ballpark at Rosemont - Rosemont, IL	2-3	Lacey Waldrop (1-0)	Lauren Haeger (0-2)	-	Lacey Waldrop	1132
Jun. 16	8:05 PM ET	**USSSA Florida Pride** (6-1)	Scrap Yard Dawgs (4-5)	Scrap Yard Sports Complex - Conroe, TX	7-0	Jolene Henderson (1-1)	Morgan Melloh (1-2)	-	Jolene Henderson	184
Jun. 16	8:35 PM ET	**Texas Charge** (5-4)	Chicago Bandits (7-5)	Ballpark at Rosemont - Rosemont, IL	5-0	Brittany Mack-Oates (1-0)	Sierra Hyland (0-1)	-	Brittany Mack-Oates	1160
Jun. 17	6:05 PM ET	Akron Racers (4-6)	**Texas Charge** (6-4)	Bobcat Softball Stadium (Texas State) - San Marcos, TX	2-5	Dallas Escobedo (2-1)	Sara Groenewegen (0-4)	Brittany Mack-Oates S(1)	Nadia Taylor	214
Jun. 17	8:05 PM ET	USSSA Florida Pride (6-2)	**Scrap Yard Dawgs** (5-5)	Scrap Yard Sports Complex - Conroe, TX	1-4	Monica Abbott (4-0)	Keilani Ricketts (2-1)	-	Monica Abbott	198
Jun. 18	2:05 PM ET	Akron Racers (4-7)	**Texas Charge** (7-4)	Bobcat Softball Stadium (Texas State) - San Marcos, TX	9-12	Brittany Mack-Oates (2-0)	Jailyn Ford (1-1)	-	Kristyn Sandberg	357
Jun. 18	4:05 PM ET DH	**Chicago Bandits** (8-5)	Beijing Shougang Eagles (0-7)	Ballpark at Rosemont - Rosemont, IL	8-0	Lacey Waldrop (2-0)	Wang Lan (0-4)	Breanna Wonderly S(1)	Megan Blank	522
Jun. 18	8:05 PM ET DH	**Chicago Bandits** (9-5)	Beijing Shougang Eagles (0-8)	Ballpark at Rosemont - Rosemont, IL	8-1	Ellen Roberts (1-2)	Li Qi (0-3)	-	Sahvanna Jaquish	541
Jun. 19	8:05 PM ET	**USSSA Florida Pride** (7-2)	Texas Charge (7-5)	Getterman Stadium - Waco, TX	8-0	Kelsey Nunley (3-0)	Dallas Escobedo (2-2)	-	Kelsey Nunley	321
Jun. 20	8:05 PM ET	Chicago Bandits (9-6)	**Scrap Yard Dawgs** (6-5)	Scrap Yard Sports Complex - Woodlands, TX	8-0	Monica Abbott (5-0)	Haylie Wagner (5-2)	-	Kiki Stokes	441
Jun. 20	8:05 PM ET	**USSSA Florida Pride** (8-2)	Texas Charge (7-6)	Bobcat Softball Stadium (Texas State) - San Marcos, TX	16-2	Keilani Ricketts (3-1)	Brittany Mack-Oates (2-1)	-	Lauren Chamberlain	487
Jun. 21	7:05 PM ET	Beijing Shougang Eagles (0-9)	**Akron Racers** (5-7)	Firestone Stadium - Akron, OH	2-12	Emily Weiman (1-1)	Wang Lan (0-5)	-	Emily Weiman	841
Jun. 21	8:05 PM ET	Chicago Bandits (9-7)	**Scrap Yard Dawgs** (7-5)	Scrap Yard Sports Complex - Woodlands, TX	7-8	Miranda Kramer (1-1)	Lacey Waldrop (2-1)	-	Kiki Stokes	60
Jun. 22	7:05 PM ET	Beijing Shougang Eagles (0-10)	**Akron Racers** (6-7)	Firestone Stadium - Akron, OH	1-2	Megan Betsa (1-0)	Li Qi (0-4)	-	Megan Betsa	481
Jun. 22	8:05 PM ET	Chicago Bandits (9-8)	**Scrap Yard Dawgs** (8-5)	Scrap Yard Sports Complex - Conroe, TX	4-7	Morgan Melloh (2-2)	Shelby Turnier (1-2)	Monica Abbott S(2)	Nerissa Myers	137
Jun. 23	5:05 PM ET	USSSA Florida Pride	Beijing Shougang Eagles	Firestone Stadium - Akron, OH	**Postponed (Inclement weather)**(Makeup date:Jun. 24)					
Jun. 23	7:35 PM ET	USSSA Florida Pride	Akron Racers	Firestone Stadium - Akron, OH	**Postponed (Inclement weather)**(Makeup date:Jul. 27)					
Jun. 23	8:05 PM ET	**Chicago Bandits** (10-8)	Texas Charge (7-7)	Bobcat Softball Stadium (Texas State) - San Marcos, TX	3-2, 8 innings	Lacey Waldrop (3-1)	Brittany Mack-Oates (2-2)	-	Abby Ramirez	230
Jun. 24; Makeup game	4:35 PM ET	**USSSA Florida Pride** (9-2)	Beijing Shougang Eagles (0-11)	Firestone Stadium - Akron, OH	1-0	Keilani Ricketts (4-1)	Wang Lan (0-6)	-	Shelby Pendley	1183
Jun. 24	7:05 PM ET	**USSSA Florida Pride** (10-2)	Akron Racers (6-8)	Firestone Stadium - Akron, OH	3-2	Jolene Henderson (2-1)	Sara Groenewegen (0-5)	Jordan Taylor S(3)	Megan Wiggins	1183
Jun. 24	8:05 PM ET	Chicago Bandits (10-9)	**Texas Charge** (8-7)	Bobcat Softball Stadium (Texas State) - San Marcos, TX	1-2	Dallas Escobedo (3-2)	Ellen Roberts (1-3)	Brittany Mack-Oates S(2)	Dallas Escobedo	250
Jun. 25	2:05 PM ET	**Chicago Bandits** (11-9)	Texas Charge (8-8)	Bobcat Softball Stadium (Texas State) - San Marcos, TX	6-3	Haylie Wagner (6-2)	Lauren Haeger (0-3)	-	Sammy Marshall	193
Jun. 25	4:05 PM ET	Beijing Shougang Eagles (0-12)	**Akron Racers** (7-8)	Firestone Stadium - Akron, OH	2-15	Jailyn Ford (2-1)	Nancy Bowling (0-1)	Aimee Creger S(1)	Jennifer Gilbert	717
Jun. 25	6:35 PM ET	**USSSA Florida Pride** (11-2)	Beijing Shougang Eagles (0-13)	Firestone Stadium - Akron, OH	10-1	Kelsey Nunley (4-0)	Li Qi (0-5)	-	GiOnna DiSalvatore	717
Jun. 27	7:05 PM ET	Chicago Bandits (11-10)	**Akron Racers** (8-8)	Firestone Stadium - Akron, OH	2-3	Alexis Silkwood (3-1)	Shelby Turnier (1-3)	-	Nicole Schroeder	456
Jun. 27	9:05 PM ET	Scrap Yard Dawgs (8-6)	**Texas Charge** (9-8)	Aurora Sports Park - Aurora, CO	4-5	Ally Carda (3-0)	Morgan Melloh (2-3)	-	Lauren Haeger	932
Jun. 28	7:05 PM ET	**Chicago Bandits** (12-10)	Akron Racers (8-9)	Firestone Stadium - Akron, OH	9-1	Haylie Wagner (7-2)	Megan Betsa (1-1)	-	Haylie Wagner	4385
Jun. 28	7:05 PM ET	**Scrap Yard Dawgs** (9-6)	Texas Charge (9-9)	Christopher Complex - Westminster, CO	7-1	Monica Abbott (6-0)	Lauren Haeger (0-4)	-	Nerissa Myers	4855
Jun. 29	7:05 PM ET	Chicago Bandits (12-11)	**Akron Racers** (9-9)	Firestone Stadium - Akron, OH	0-3, 5 innings	Emily Weiman (2-2)	Lacey Waldrop (3-2)	Jailyn Ford S(1)	Emily Weiman	551
Jun. 30	7:05 PM ET	Texas Charge	Akron Racers	Firestone Stadium - Akron, OH	**Postponed (inclement weather)**(Makeup date:July 1)					
Jun. 30	8:05 PM ET	**USSSA Florida Pride** (12-2)	Scrap Yard Dawgs (9-7)	Scrap Yard Sports Complex - Conroe, TX	5-3	Angel Bunner (1-0)	Miranda Kramer (1-2)	Jordan Taylor S(4)	Jordan Taylor	422

July

Date	Time	Visitor	Home	Venue	Score	Win	Loss	Save	Player of the Game	Attendance
Jul. 01; Doubleheader/ makeup game	4:05 PM ET	Texas Charge (9-10)	**Akron Racers** (10-9)	Firestone Stadium - Akron, OH	1-3	Sara Groenewegen (1-5)	Ally Carda (3-1)	-	Sara Groenewegen	400
Jul. 01; Doubleheader/ makeup game	7:05 PM ET	Texas Charge (9-11)	**Akron Racers** (11-9)	Firestone Stadium - Akron, OH	0-1	Jailyn Ford (3-1)	Dallas Escobedo (3-3)	Alexis Silkwood S(1)	AJ Andrews	606
Jul. 01	8:05 PM ET	**USSSA Florida Pride** (13-2)	Scrap Yard Dawgs (9-8)	Scrap Yard Sports Complex - Conroe, TX	4-3	Jolene Henderson (3-1)	Monica Abbott (6-1)	-	Kelly Kretschman	320
Jul. 02	4:05 PM ET	**Texas Charge** (10-11)	Akron Racers (11-10)	Firestone Stadium - Akron, OH	13-6	Lauren Haeger (1-4)	Rachele Fico (1-1)	-	Lauren Haeger	975
Jul. 02	8:05 PM ET	**USSSA Florida Pride** (14-2)	Scrap Yard Dawgs (9-9)	Scrap Yard Sports Complex - Conroe, TX	3-1, 9 innings	Keilani Ricketts (5-1)	Monica Abbott (6-2)	Jordan Taylor S(5)	Chelsea Goodacre	342
Jul. 03	8:05 PM ET	**Akron Racers** (12-10)	Chicago Bandits (12-12)	Ballpark at Rosemont - Rosemont, IL	12-7	Alexis Silkwood (4-1)	Haylie Wagner (7-3)	-	Sam Fischer	1214
Jul. 04	2:05 PM ET	**Akron Racers** (13-10)	Chicago Bandits (12-13)	Ballpark at Rosemont - Rosemont, IL	4-2	Sara Groenewegen (2-5)	Lacey Waldrop (3-3)	Alexis Silkwood S(2)	Jennifer Gilbert	469
Jul. 04	4:05 PM ET DH	**Texas Charge** (11-11)	Beijing Shougang Eagles (0-14)	Space Coast Stadium - Viera, Florida	1-0	Dallas Escobedo (4-3)	Wang Lan (0-7)	-	Taylor Gadbois	287
Jul. 04	7:05 PM ET DH	Scrap Yard Dawgs (9-10)	**USSSA Florida Pride** (15-2)	Space Coast Stadium - Viera, Florida	0-1, 8 innings	Angel Bunner (2-0)	Morgan Foley (0-1)	-	Kelsey Nunley	649
Jul. 05	5:05 PM ET DH	Texas Charge	**Beijing Shougang Eagles** (1-14)	Space Coast Stadium - Viera, Florida	1-2, 8 innings	Li Qi (1-5)	Lauren Haeger (1-5)	-	Wang Bei	320
Jul. 05	8:05 PM ET DH	**Scrap Yard Dawgs** (10-10)	USSSA Florida Pride (15-3)	Space Coast Stadium - Viera, Florida	2-0	Morgan Foley (1-1)	Keilani Ricketts (5-2)	-	Allexis Bennett	445
Jul. 06	5:05 PM ET DH	**Scrap Yard Dawgs** (11-10)	Beijing Shougang Eagles (1-15)	Space Coast Stadium - Viera, Florida	3-2, 10 innings	Monica Abbott (7-2)	Wang Lan (0-8)	-	Monica Abbott	98
Jul. 06	8:05 PM ET DH	Beijing Shougang Eagles (1-16)	**USSSA Florida Pride** (16-3)	Space Coast Stadium - Viera, Florida	0-12	Jolene Henderson (4-1)	Nancy Bowling (0-2)	-	Jolene Henderson	355
Jul. 07	5:05 PM ET DH	Texas Charge (11-13)	**USSSA Florida Pride** (17-3)	Felsberg Field (FIU) - Miami, FL	2-6	Keilani Ricketts (6-2)	Coley Ries (0-1)	Jordan Taylor S(6)	Sierra Romero	203
Jul. 07	7:05 PM ET	**Chicago Bandits** (13-13)	Akron Racers (13-11)	Firestone Stadium - Akron, OH	8-4	Haylie Wagner (8-3)	Laura Winter (0-1)	-	Natalie Hernandez	648
Jul. 07	8:05 PM ET DH	Beijing Shougang Eagles (1-17)	**USSSA Florida Pride** (18-3)	Felsberg Field (FIU) - Miami, FL	1-2	Angel Bunner (3-0)	Wang Lan (0-9)	-	Chelsea Goodacre	459
Jul. 08	5:05 PM ET DH	Beijing Shougang Eagles (1-18)	**Texas Charge** (12-13)	Felsberg Field (FIU) - Miami, FL	0-1	Dallas Escobedo (5-3)	Wang Lan (0-10)	-	Dallas Escobedo	235
Jul. 08	7:05 PM ET	**Chicago Bandits** (14-13)	Akron Racers (13-12)	Firestone Stadium - Akron, OH	3-2	Haylie Wagner (9-3)	Rachele Fico (1-2)	Breanna Wonderly S(2)	Emily Crane	684
Jul. 08	8:05 PM ET DH	Texas Charge (12-14)	**USSSA Florida Pride** (19-3)	Felsberg Field (FIU) - Miami, FL	2-8	Kelsey Nunley (5-0)	Brittany Mack-Oates (2-3)	-	Shelby Pendley	605
Jul. 09	4:05 PM ET	**Scrap Yard Dawgs** (12-10)	Beijing Shougang Eagles (1-19)	Firestone Stadium - Akron, OH	10-7	Rachel Fox (1-0)	Li Qi (1-6)	-	Allexis Bennett	156
Jul. 09	7:05 PM ET	Texas Charge (12-15)	**USSSA Florida Pride** (20-3)	Felsberg Field (FIU) - Miami, FL	1-2	Jolene Henderson (5-1)	Lauren Haeger (1-6)	Jordan Taylor S(7)	Sierra Romero	542
Jul. 10	5:05 PM ET DH	Scrap Yard Dawgs	Beijing Shougang Eagles	Firestone Stadium - Akron, OH	**Postponed (Inclement weather)**					
Jul. 10	7:35 PM ET DH	Scrap Yard Dawgs	Akron Racers	Firestone Stadium - Akron, OH	**Postponed (Inclement weather) (Makeup date:Aug. 09)**					
Jul. 10	8:05 PM ET	USSSA Florida Pride (20-4)	**Texas Charge** (13-15)	CommunityAmerica Ballpark - Kansas City, KS	4-7	Coley Ries (1-1)	Keilani Ricketts (6-3)	Dallas Escobedo S(1)	Lauren Haeger	6739
Jul. 11	5:05 PM ET DH	Beijing Shougang Eagles (1-20)	**Akron Racers** (14-12)	Firestone Stadium - Akron, OH	2-7	Emily Weiman(3-1)	Wang Lan (0-11)	-	Ashley Thomas	201
Jul. 11	7:35 PM ET DH	**Scrap Yard Dawgs** (13-10)	Akron Racers (14-13)	Firestone Stadium - Akron, OH	2-0	Monica Abbott (8-2)	Megan Betsa (1-2)	-	Monica Abbott	502
Jul. 11	8:05 PM ET	USSSA Florida Pride (20-5)	**Texas Charge** (14-15)	CommunityAmerica Ballpark - Kansas City, KS	3-4	Dallas Escobedo (6-3)	Kelsey Nunley (5-1)	-	Dallas Escobedo	1663
Jul. 12	12:05 PM ET	Beijing Shougang Eagles (1-21)	**Akron Racers** (15-13)	Firestone Stadium - Akron, OH	0-4	Rachele Fico (2-2)	Li Qi (1-7)	-	Rachele Fico	917
Jul. 12	7:05 PM ET	**Scrap Yard Dawgs** (14-10)	Beijing Shougang Eagles (1-22)	Firestone Stadium - Akron, OH	8-0	Cheridan Hawkins (1-1)	Nancy Bowling (0-3)	-	Allexis Bennett	117
Jul. 12	8:05 PM ET	USSSA Florida Pride (20-6)	**Texas Charge** (15-15)	CommunityAmerica Ballpark - Kansas City, KS	0-2	Lauren Haeger (2-6)	Angel Bunner (3-1)	-	Bailey Landry	1544
Jul. 14	7:05 PM ET	Akron Racers (15-14)	**USSSA Florida Pride** (21-6)	Space Coast Stadium - Viera, Florida	0-3	Jolene Henderson (6-1)	Megan Betsa (1-3)	-		559
Jul. 14	8:05 PM ET	**Scrap Yard Dawgs** (15-10)	Texas Charge (15-16)	Bobcat Softball Stadium (Texas State) - San Marcos, TX	5-0	Monica Abbott (9-2)	Delanie Gourley (0-1)	-	Katiyana Mauga	621
Jul. 15	5:05 PM ET DH	**Akron Racers** (16-14)	Beijing Shougang Eagles (1-23)	Space Coast Stadium - Viera, Florida	9-1	Emily Weiman (4-1)	Nancy Bowling (0-4)	-	Ashley Thomas	223
Jul. 15	6:05 PM ET	Chicago Bandits	Scrap Yard Dawgs	Scrap Yard Sports Complex - Conroe, TX	**Postponed (Inclement weather)**(Makeup date:Jul. 16)					
Jul. 15	8:05 PM ET DH	**USSSA Florida Pride** (22-6)	Beijing Shougang Eagles (1-24)	Space Coast Stadium - Viera, Florida	12-0	Hannah Rogers (1-0)	Wang Lan (0-12)	-	Lauren Chamberlain	419
Jul. 16; Makeup game	4:00 PM ET DH	**Chicago Bandits** (15-13)	Scrap Yard Dawgs (15-11)	Scrap Yard Sports Complex - Conroe, TX	5-0	Danielle O'Toole (1-0)	Morgan Melloh (2-4)	-	Danielle O'Toole	
Jul. 16	6:40 PM ET	Chicago Bandits (15-14)	**Scrap Yard Dawgs** (16-11)	Scrap Yard Sports Complex - Conroe, TX	6-7	Monica Abbott (10-2)	Shelby Turnier (1-4)	-	Kasey Cooper	837
Jul. 16	5:05 PM ET DH	**Akron Racers** (17-14)	Beijing Shougang Eagles (1-25)	Space Coast Stadium - Viera, Florida	2-1	Jailyn Ford (4-1)	Wang Lan (0-13)	-	Jailyn Ford	184
Jul. 16	8:05 PM ET DH	Akron Racers (17-15)	**USSSA Florida Pride** (23-6)	Space Coast Stadium - Viera, Florida	3-4	Kelsey Nunley (6-1)	Rachele Fico (2-3)	Jordan Taylor S(8)		397
Jul. 17	7:05 PM ET	Beijing Shougang Eagles	USSSA Florida Pride	Champion Stadium - Kissimmee, FL	**Postponed (Inclement weather)**(Makeup date:if necessary)					
Jul. 18	5:05 PM ET DH	**Chicago Bandits** (16-14)	Beijing Shougang Eagles (1-26)	Space Coast Stadium - Viera, Florida	3-0	Haylie Wagner (10-3)	Li Qi (1-8)	Breanna Wonderly S(3)	Haylie Wagner	185
Jul. 18	8:05 PM ET	Akron Racers (17-16)	**Texas Charge** (16-16)	Bobcat Softball Stadium (Texas State) - San Marcos, TX	1-4	Lauren Haeger (3-6)	Megan Betsa (1-4)	-	Lauren Haeger	255
Jul. 18	8:05 PM ET DH	Chicago Bandits (16-15)	**USSSA Florida Pride** (24-6)	Space Coast Stadium - Viera, Florida	2-8	Angel Bunner (4-1)	Lacey Waldrop (3-4)	-	Angel Bunner	274
Jul. 19	7:05 PM ET	Chicago Bandits	Beijing Shougang Eagles	Space Coast Stadium - Viera, Florida	**Postponed (Inclement weather)**					
Jul. 19	8:05 PM ET	**Akron Racers** (18-16)	Texas Charge (16-17)	Bobcat Softball Stadium (Texas State) - San Marcos, TX	5-3, 8 innings	Aimee Creger (1-0)	Dallas Escobedo (6-4)	Rachele Fico S(1)	Sam Fischer	113
Jul. 20	7:05 PM ET	Chicago Bandits (16-16)	**USSSA Florida Pride** (25-6)	Space Coast Stadium - Viera, Florida	0-3	Keilani Ricketts (7-3)	Kaia Parnaby (0-1)	Kelsey Nunley S(1)	Lauren Chamberlain	487
Jul. 20	8:05 PM ET	**Akron Racers** (19-16)	Texas Charge (16-18)	Scrap Yard Sports Complex - Conroe, TX (Note: Game moved from Sugar Land to Conroe due to weather)	2-1	Rachele Fico (3-3)	Lauren Haeger (3-7)	-	Rachele Fico	107
Jul. 21	6:30 PM ET DH	Beijing Shougang Eagles (1-27)	**Scrap Yard Dawgs** (17-11)	Constellation Field - Sugar Land, TX	2-3	Monica Abbott (11-2)	Wang Lan (0-14)	-		
Jul. 21	8:30 PM ET DH	Beijing Shougang Eagles (1-28)	**Scrap Yard Dawgs** (18-11)	Constellation Field - Sugar Land, TX	7-8, 10 innings	Morgan Melloh (3-4)	Wang Lan (0-15)	-		960
Jul. 22	8:05 PM ET	Akron Racers (19-17)	**Scrap Yard Dawgs** (19-11)	Scrap Yard Sports Complex - Conroe, TX	1-3	Monica Abbott (12-2)	Jailyn Ford (4-2)	-	Brittany Cervantes	183
Jul. 22	8:05 PM ET	Beijing Shougang Eagles (1-29)	**Texas Charge** (17-18)	Bobcat Softball Stadium (Texas State) - San Marcos, TX	0-6	Dallas Escobedo (7-4)	Nancy Bowling (0-5)	-	Dallas Escobedo	134
Jul. 22	8:35 PM ET	USSSA Florida Pride (25-7)	**Chicago Bandits** (17-16)	Ballpark at Rosemont - Rosemont, IL	3-7	Shelby Turnier (2-4)	Jolene Henderson (6-2)	Haylie Wagner S(1)	Shelby Turnier	1562
Jul. 23	2:05 PM ET	Akron Racers (19-18)	**Scrap Yard Dawgs** (20-11)	Scrap Yard Sports Complex - Conroe, TX	6-7	Cheridan Hawkins (2-1)	Megan Betsa (1-5)	-	Anissa Urtez	102
Jul. 23	4:05 PM ET	USSSA Florida Pride (25-8)	**Chicago Bandits** (18-16)	Ballpark at Rosemont - Rosemont, IL	1-2	Kaia Parnaby (1-1)	Jordan Taylor (1-1)	-	Danielle Zymkowitz	1001
Jul. 23; Resumption of suspended June 14 game	5:05 PM ET	Beijing Shougang Eagles (1-30)	**Texas Charge** (18-18)	Bobcat Softball Stadium (Texas State) - San Marcos, TX	1-9	Emily Vincent (1-0)	Nancy Bowling (0-6)	-	Koral Costa, Missy Taukeiaho	120
Jul. 23	8:05 PM ET	**Beijing Shougang Eagles** (2-30)	Texas Charge (18-19)	Bobcat Softball Stadium (Texas State) - San Marcos, TX	2-1	Wang Lan (1-15)	Jill Compton (1-2)	-	Wang Lan	120
Jul. 25	12:05 PM ET DH	**Scrap Yard Dawgs** (21-11)	Chicago Bandits (18-17)	Ballpark at Rosemont - Rosemont, IL	8-4	Monica Abbott (13-2)	Danielle O'Toole (1-1)	-	Taylor Edwards	1542
Jul. 25	4:05 PM ET DH	**Scrap Yard Dawgs** (22-11)	Chicago Bandits (18-18)	Ballpark at Rosemont - Rosemont, IL	9-0	Cheridan Hawkins (3-1)	Shelby Turnier (2-5)	-	Hannah Flippen	1542
Jul. 25	7:05 PM ET	**USSSA Florida Pride** (26-8)	Akron Racers (19-19)	Firestone Stadium - Akron, OH	5-3	Keilani Ricketts (8-3)	Megan Betsa (1-6)	Jordan Taylor S(9)	Megan Wiggins	582
Jul. 25	8:05 PM ET	Beijing Shougang Eagles (2-31)	**Texas Charge** (19-19)	Bobcat Softball Stadium (Texas State) - San Marcos, TX	2-23	Delanie Gourley (1-1)	Li Qi (1-9)	-	Mysha Sataraka	150
Jul. 26	7:05 PM ET	**USSSA Florida Pride** (27-8)	Akron Racers (19-20)	Firestone Stadium - Akron, OH	9-1	Angel Bunner (5-1)	Sara Groenewegen (2-6)	-	Angel Bunner	1109
Jul. 26	8:05 PM ET	Scrap Yard Dawgs (22-12)	**Chicago Bandits** (19-18)	Ballpark at Rosemont - Rosemont, IL	1-8	Kaia Parnaby (2-1)	Morgan Melloh (3-5)	-	Kaia Parnaby	1021
Jul. 26	8:05 PM ET	Beijing Shougang Eagles (2-32)	**Texas Charge** (20-19)	Bobcat Softball Stadium (Texas State) - San Marcos, TX	1-6	Brittany Mack-Oates (3-3)	Wang Lan (1-16)	-	Brittany Mack-Oakes	125
Jul. 27; Makeup game	5:05 PM ET	**USSSA Florida Pride** (28-8)	Akron Racers (19-21)	Firestone Stadium - Akron, OH	3-1	Hannah Rogers (2-0)	Aimee Creger (1-1)	Jordan Taylor S(10)	Kirsti Merritt	781
Jul. 27	7:05 PM ET	**USSSA Florida Pride** (29-8)	Akron Racers (19-22)	Firestone Stadium - Akron, OH	13-4	Kelsey Nunley (7-1)	Jailyn Ford (4-3)	-	Sierra Romero	826
Jul. 28	6:30 PM ET DH	Beijing Shougang Eagles (2-33)	**Scrap Yard Dawgs** (23-12)	Scrap Yard Sports Complex - Conroe, TX	4-14	Cheridan Hawkins (4-1)	Nancy Bowling (0-7)	-	Meagan May-Whitley	182
Jul. 28	8:30 PM ET DH	Beijing Shougang Eagles (2-34)	**Scrap Yard Dawgs** (24-12)	Scrap Yard Sports Complex - Conroe, TX	1-15	Miranda Kramer (2-2)	Li Qi (1-10)	-	Katiyana Mauga	182
Jul. 29	6:00 PM ET DH	Beijing Shougang Eagles (2-35)	**Scrap Yard Dawgs** (25-12)	Scrap Yard Sports Complex - Conroe, TX	2-3	Cheridan Hawkins (5-1)	Wang Lan (1-17)	-	Ali Aguilar	247
Jul. 29	8:30 PM ET DH	Texas Charge (20-20)	**Scrap Yard Dawgs** (26-12)	Scrap Yard Sports Complex - Conroe, TX	0-1	Monica Abbott (14-2)	Dallas Escobedo (7-5)	-	Monica Abbott	247
Jul. 30	8:30 PM ET	Texas Charge (20-21)	**Scrap Yard Dawgs** (27-12)	Scrap Yard Sports Complex - Conroe, TX	3-8	Rachel Fox (2-0)	Lauren Haeger (3-8)	Miranda Kramer S(1)	Taylor Edwards	332

August

Date	Time	Visitor	Home	Venue	Score	Win	Loss	Save	Player of the Game	Attendance
Aug. 01	4:05 PM ET	**Scrap Yard Dawgs** (28-12)	Beijing Shougang Eagles (2-36)	Ballpark at Rosemont - Rosemont, IL	4-0	Cheridan Hawkins (6-1)	Nancy Bowling (0-8)	-	Cheridan Hawkins	25
Aug. 01	7:05 PM ET	Texas Charge (20-22)	**USSSA Florida Pride** (30-8)	Space Coast Stadium - Viera, Florida	1-4	Kelsey Nunley (8-1)	Dallas Escobedo (7-6)	Keilani Ricketts S(1)	Keilani Ricketts	336
Aug. 01	8:05 PM ET	**Chicago Bandits** (20-18)	Beijing Shougang Eagles (2-37)	Ballpark at Rosemont - Rosemont, IL	5-4	Sierra Hyland (1-1)	Wang Lan (1-18)	Ellen Roberts S(2)	Ellen Roberts	466
Aug. 02	7:05 PM ET	Texas Charge (20-23)	**USSSA Florida Pride** (31-8)	Space Coast Stadium - Viera, Florida	1-6	Angel Bunner (6-1)	Coley Ries (1-2)	-	Shelby Pendley	235
Aug. 02 (Note: Game rescheduled from original July 30 date)	5:05 PM ET	Beijing Shougang Eagles (2-38)	**Chicago Bandits** (21-18)	Ballpark at Rosemont - Rosemont, IL	2-9	Haylie Wagner (11-3)	Nancy Bowling (0-10)	-	Haylie Wagner	775
Aug. 02	8:05 PM ET	**Scrap Yard Dawgs** (29-12)	Chicago Bandits (21-19)	Ballpark at Rosemont - Rosemont, IL	5-0	Monica Abbott (15-2)	Lacey Waldrop (3-5)	-	Monica Abbott	775
Aug. 03	7:05 PM ET	**Akron Racers** (20-22)	Beijing Shougang Eagles (2-39)	Firestone Stadium - Akron, OH	13-0	Rachele Fico (4-3)	Wang Lan (1-19)	-	Rachele Fico	452
Aug. 03	8:05 PM ET	Scrap Yard Dawgs (29-13)	**Chicago Bandits** (22-19)	Ballpark at Rosemont - Rosemont, IL	2-5	Kaia Parnaby (3-1)	Morgan Melloh (3-6)	Shelby Turnier S(1)	Kaia Parnaby	507
Aug. 04	7:05 PM ET	Scrap Yard Dawgs (29-14)	**USSSA Florida Pride** (32-8)	Space Coast Stadium - Viera, Florida	0-3	Keilani Ricketts (9-3)	Rachel Fox (2-1)	Jordan Taylor S(11)	Keilani Ricketts	573
Aug. 04	7:05 PM ET	Akron Racers	Beijing Shougang Eagles	Firestone Stadium - Akron, OH	**Postponed (Inclement weather)**(Makeup date:Aug. 05)					
Aug. 05	5:05 PM ET	Chicago Bandits (22-20)	**Texas Charge** (21-23)	Bobcat Softball Stadium (Texas State) - San Marcos, TX	3-4	Lauren Haeger (4-8)	Lacey Waldrop (3-6)	-	Lauren Haeger	450
Aug. 05	7:05 PM ET	Scrap Yard Dawgs (29-15)	**USSSA Florida Pride** (33-8)	Space Coast Stadium - Viera, Florida	1-3	Jolene Henderson (7-2)	Miranda Kramer (2-3)	Jordan Taylor S(12)		522
Aug. 05; Makeup game	4:05 PM ET	**Akron Racers** (21-22)	Beijing Shougang Eagles (2-40)	Firestone Stadium - Akron, OH	7-0	Emily Weiman (5-1)	Li Qi (1-11)	-	Emily Weiman	227
Aug. 05	7:05 PM ET	**Akron Racers** (22-22)	Beijing Shougang Eagles2-41	Firestone Stadium - Akron, OH	9-0	Megan Betsa (2-6)	Wang Lan (1-20)	-	Sami Fagan	689
Aug. 06	2:05 PM ET	**Chicago Bandits** (23-20)	Texas Charge (21-24)	Bobcat Softball Stadium (Texas State) - San Marcos, TX	8-6	Kaia Parnaby (4-1)	Coley Ries (1-3)	Haylie Wagner S(2)	Emily Carosone	205
Aug. 06	7:05 PM ET	Scrap Yard Dawgs (29-16)	**USSSA Florida Pride** (34-8)	Space Coast Stadium - Viera, Florida	0-3	Jessica Burroughs (1-0)	Rachel Fox (2-2)	Hannah Rogers S(1)	Jessica Burroughs	325
Aug. 07	7:05 PM ET	Beijing Shougang Eagles (2-42)	**USSSA Florida Pride** (35-8)	Space Coast Stadium - Viera, Florida	0-11	Hannah Rogers (3-0)	Gu Nian Nian (0-1)	-	Bianka Bell	194
Aug. 08	7:05 PM ET	**Scrap Yard Dawgs** (30-16)	Akron Racers (22-23)	Firestone Stadium - Akron, OH	7-1	Monica Abbott (16-2)	Rachele Fico (4-4)	-	Nerissa Myers	720
Aug. 08	8:05 PM ET	**Texas Charge** (22-24)	Chicago Bandits (23-21)	Ballpark at Rosemont - Rosemont, IL	5-0	Lauren Haeger (5-8)	Haylie Wagner (11-4)	-	Lauren Haeger	598
Aug. 08	5:05 PM ET DH	**USSSA Florida Pride** (36-8)	Beijing Shougang Eagles (2-43)	Space Coast Stadium - Viera, Florida	3-0	Keilani Ricketts (10-3)	Wang Lan (1-21)	Angel Bunner S(1)	Hallie Wilson	75
Aug. 08	8:05 PM ET DH	USSSA Florida Pride (36-9)	**Beijing Shougang Eagles** (3-43)	Space Coast Stadium - Viera, Florida	1-2	Li Qi (2-11)	Jordan Taylor (1-2)	-	Sun Xun	265
Aug. 09; Makeup game	4:35 PM ET	Scrap Yard Dawgs (30-17)	**Akron Racers** (23-23)	Firestone Stadium - Akron, OH	5-7	Jailyn Ford (5-3)	Monica Abbott (16-3)	-	Shellie Robinson	193
Aug. 09	7:05 PM ET	Scrap Yard Dawgs (30-18)	**Akron Racers** (24-23)	Firestone Stadium - Akron, OH	3-7	Megan Betsa (3-6)	Moranda Kramer (2-4)	-	AJ Andrews	1253
Aug. 09	7:05 PM ET	Beijing Shougang Eagles (3-44)	**USSSA Florida Pride** (37-9)	Space Coast Stadium - Viera, Florida	0-11	Jolene Henderson (8-2)	Wang Lan (1-22)	-	Kirsti Merritt	246
Aug. 09; Makeup game	4:35 PM ET	Texas Charge (22-25)	**Chicago Bandits** (24-21)	Ballpark at Rosemont - Rosemont, IL	0-8	Kaia Parnaby (5-1)	Coley Ries (1-4)	Shelby Turnier S(2)	Emily Crane	707
Aug. 09	8:05 PM ET	Texas Charge (22-26)	**Chicago Bandits** (25-21)	Ballpark at Rosemont - Rosemont, IL	7-10	Kaia Parnaby (6-1)	Lauren Haeger (5-9)	Haylie Wagner S(3)	Brenna Moss	707
Aug. 10	7:05 PM ET	**Scrap Yard Dawgs** (31-18)	Akron Racers (24-24)	Firestone Stadium - Akron, OH	5-2	Monica Abbott (17-3)	Jailyn Ford (5-4)	-	Brittany Cervantes	690
Aug. 11	8:35 PM ET	**USSSA Florida Pride** (38-9)	Chicago Bandits (25-22)	Ballpark at Rosemont - Rosemont, IL	7-5	Jordan Taylor (2-2)	Sierra Hyland (1-2)	-	Megan Wiggins	978
Aug. 12	7:05 PM ET	Texas Charge (22-27)	**Akron Racers** (25-24)	Firestone Stadium - Akron, OH	2-4	Rachele Fico (5-4)	Lauren Haeger (5-10)	Aimee Creger S(2)	Sami Fagan	947
Aug. 12	8:35 PM ET	**USSSA Florida Pride** (39-9)	Chicago Bandits (25-23)	Ballpark at Rosemont - Rosemont, IL	8-2	Angel Bunner (7-1)	Haylie Wagner (11-5)	-	Kirsti Merritt	1727
Aug. 13	4:05 PM ET	**USSSA Florida Pride** (40-9)	Chicago Bandits (25-24)	Ballpark at Rosemont - Rosemont, IL	4-2	Hannah Rogers (4-0)	Shelby Turnier (2-6)	-	Sierra Romero	1593
Aug. 13	4:05 PM ET	Texas Charge (22-28)	**Akron Racers** (26-24)	Firestone Stadium - Akron, OH	1-2	Aimee Creger (2-1)	Kelsee Selman-Rowe (0-1)	-	Sami Fagan	984

== NPF Championship ==
Logo for the 2017 NPF Championship Series

The 2017 NPF Championship was held at Tiger Park in Baton Rouge, La. on the LSU campus from August 17–20. This was the first time this venue has been selected for the NPF Championship.

The Pride and Dawgs both swept their semifinal series 2 games to 0, against the Bandits and Racers, respectively. USSSA was able to beat Monica Abbott in game one of the final series. However, on the second day, Abbott pitched two complete games to clinch the championship for the Dawgs. Abbott was named MVP of the championship.

NPF Semifinals
1	USSSA	2
4	Chicago	0
2	Scrap Yard	2
3	Akron	0

NPF Championship
1	USSSA	1
2	Scrap Yard	2

2017 NPF Semifinals USSSA Pride defeat Chicago Bandits, 2-0
Game	Date	Score	Winning Pitcher	Save	Losing Pitcher	Player of the Game	Attendance	Series (USSSA–CHI)
1	Aug. 17	USSSA Pride 4, Chicago Bandits 1	Keilani Ricketts	Jordan Taylor	Kaia Parnaby	Sierra Romero	597	1-0
2	Aug. 18	USSSA Pride 3, Chicago Bandits 1	Angel Bunner	-	Shelby Turnier	Lauren Chamberlain	1619	2-0

2017 NPF Semifinals Scrap Yard Dawgs defeat Akron Racers, 2-0
Game	Date	Score	Winning Pitcher	Save	Losing Pitcher	Player of the Game	Attendance	Series (SY–AKR)
1	Aug. 17	Scrap Yard Dawgs 4, Akron Racers 1	Monica Abbott	-	Jailyn Ford	Monica Abbott	597	1-0
2	Aug. 18	Scrap Yard Dawgs 4, Akron Racers 3	Monica Abbott	-	Megan Betsa	Nerissa Myers	896	2-0

2017 NPF Championship Series Scrap Yard Dawgs defeat USSSA Pride, 2-1
Game	Date	Score	Winning Pitcher	Save	Losing Pitcher	Player of the Game	Attendance	Series (USSSA-SY)
1	Aug. 19	USSSA Pride 5, Scrap Yard Dawgs 0	Jolene Henderson	-	Monica Abbott	Jolene Henderson	1741	1-0
2	Aug. 20	USSSA Pride 0, Scrap Yard Dawgs 2	Monica Abbott	-	Keilani Ricketts	Monica Abbott	1086	1-1
3	Aug. 20	USSSA Pride 2, Scrap Yard Dawgs 5	Monica Abbott	-	Angel Bunner	Monica Abbott	1086	1-2

=== Championship Game ===
Team	Top Batter	Stats.
Scrap Yard Dawgs	Kasey Cooper	1-3 3RBIs HR BB
USSSA Pride	Megan Wiggins	1-3 RBI HR K

Team	Pitcher	IP	H	R	ER	BB	SO
Scrap Yard Dawgs	Monica Abbott (W)	7.0	4	2	1	1	11
USSSA Pride	Kelsey Nunley	3.0	2	1	1	0	2
USSSA Pride	Angel Bunner (L)	3.0	4	3	3	0	1
USSSA Pride	Jordan Taylor	1.0	1	1	0	2	2

2017 NPF Championship Series MVP
Player	Club	Stats.
Monica Abbott	Scrap Yard Dawgs	4-1 56Ks 1.45 ERA SH 0.65 WHIP (15Hs+4BBs/29.0 IP)

== Statistical leaders ==
Source: http://npf.805stats.com/leaderboard.php

Hitting leaders
Stat	Player	Total
HR	Shelby Pendley (Pride)	13
RBI	Taylor Edwards (Dawgs)	34
H	Kelly Kretschman (Pride)	58
R	Megan Wiggins (Pride)	34
AVG	Kelly Kretschman (Pride)	.500
OBP	Kelly Kretschman (Pride)	.623
SLG	Kelly Kretschman (Pride)	.793
SB	Taylor Gadbois (Charge)	25
2B	Sahvanna Jaquish (Bandits)	12
3B	Megan Wiggins (Pride)	4

Pitching leaders
Stat	Player	Total
ERA	Jordan Taylor (Pride)	0.995
Strike %	Keilani Ricketts (Pride)	71.922%
K	Monica Abbott (Dawgs)	213
W	Monica Abbott (Dawgs)	17
SHO	Monica Abbott (Dawgs)	6
No-hitter	Monica Abbott (Dawgs); Brittany Mack-Oates (Charge)	1

== Players of the Week ==
Week		Offensive Player of the Week			Pitcher of the Week			Rookie of the Week		
Week		Player(s)	Team(s)	Highlights	Player(s)	Team(s)	Highlights	Player(s)	Team(s)	Highlights
1	June 1–11	Sammy Marshall	Chicago Bandits	SB:2;BA:.667;4 of 5 multi-hit games; 9 singles 1 double 1 triple 1 home run; Led NPF in batting average, runs scored, hits and total bases	Ally Carda	Texas Charge	W/L: 2-0 ERA:0.62 K:11 BB:1 6 shutout innings in NPF debut	Xi Kai Lin	Beijing Shougang Eagles	BA:.625 OBP:.700
2	June 12–18	Kelly Kretschman	USSSA Pride	BA: .625, OBP: .750, R:2, 2B:1, HR:1, RBI:4	Dallas Escobedo	Texas Charge	W-L: 2-0 with a complete game shutout. ERA: 0.82, K: 26	Bailey Landry	Texas Charge	2B:2, 3B:1, HR:1, SB:1, BA:.474, R:9, RBI:5
3	June 19–25	Kiki Stokes	Scrap Yard Dawgs	BA:.875, OBP:.889, SLG:1.875, 2B:2, HR:2, R:5, RBI:5	Monica Abbott	Scrap Yard Dawgs	ERA: 0.00, K:18, CG ShO	Megan Betsa	Akron Racers	1st NPF win, IP:7, H:1
4	June 26-July 2	Lauren Haeger	Texas Charge	SLG:1.267, RBI:6, HR:4	Jailyn Ford	Akron Racers	6 shutout innings, allowed 2 hits, OppBA: .100	Nicole Schroeder	Akron Racers	BA:.333 XBH:3 HR:2 SLG:.800
5	July 3-July 9	Shellie Robinson	Akron Racers	BA:.636, OBP:.643, RBI:6, SB:2, R:5, SLG: 1.091	Dallas Escobedo	Texas Charge	Two complete-game shutouts, W-L:2-0, ERA: 0.00, IP:14, K:19, BB:0	Allexis Bennett	Scrap Yard Dawgs	BA: .571, SLG: .857, OBP: .600, RBI:4
6	July 10–16	Ashley Thomas	Akron Racers	R:7, RBI:6, 1st in the league in hits, runs, triples, total bases and RBIs	Monica Abbott	Scrap Yard Dawgs	W-L:3-0, K:30, 2 1-hitters	Bailey Landry	Texas Charge	BA: .364, SLG: 1.091, 3B, HR:2
7	July 17–23	Brittany Cervantes	Scrap Yard Dawgs	BA: .769 avg, OBP: .800, led league in avg, obp, hits, doubles, total bases, and fewest strikeouts	Nicole Ries	Texas Charge	IP: 9, ER: 0, R: 0, OBA: .156 BB: 0, HBP: 0, K: 7	Bailey Landry	Texas Charge	BA: .455, H: 10, SB:3, R:5
8	July 24–30	Kelly Kretschman	USSSA Florida Pride	BA: .616, SLG: 1.000, OBP: .643, R:4, RBI:4	Brittany Mack-Oates	Texas Charge	Pitched a no-hitter, W-L:1-0, IP:10, ERA: 0.00, H: 0, K: 0	Kasey Cooper	Scrap Yard Dawgs	BA: .571, OBP: .667, R: 7, RBI: 5, led league in runs scored, walks, and on-base percentage; top 5 in hits, doubles, and batting average.
9	July 31-August 6	Sami Fagan	Akron Racers	BA: .545, HR: 3, 2B: 2, SLG: 1.545, OBP: .583. R: 7, RBI: 8,	Monica Abbott	Scrap Yard Dawgs	Pitched a no-hitter; K: 18, G: 1, led or tied for the lead in ERA, shutouts, complete games, runs allowed, strike outs, hits allowed, and opposing batting average.	Wang Bei	Beijing Shougang Eagles	BA: .462, OBP: .533, led all rookies in batting average, hits, obp, sac bunts, walks, and triples
10	August 7–13	Megan Wiggins	USSSA Florida Pride	BA: .462, OBP: .517, SLG: .846, HR: 2, 3B: 2, R: 8, RBI: 9, led league in runs scored, hits, RBIs, triples, home runs (tied for 1st), and total bases. top 5 in avg, slg, obp, and walks.	Kaia Parnaby	Chicago Bandits	In 3 appearances, IP: 11, W-L:2-0, R: 1, H: 6, K: 11, OBA: .150 top 5 in era, opp avg, strikeouts, wins and total runs allowed.	Li Qi	Beijing Shougang Eagles	Complete game, R:1, BB: 1, K: 4, OBA: .222

== Annual awards ==
The NPF's annual awards and All-NPF Team were announced at its league banquet, held August 16 at the Crowne Plaza in Baton Rouge, LA. Kelly Kretschman won her third consecutive Player of the Year award, hitting a league-record .500. Monica Abbott won her sixth overall Pitcher of the Year award. A new award, Umpire of the Year, was presented for the first time.

The 2017 winners:

Award	Player	Team
Player of the Year Award	Kelly Kretschman	USSSA Pride
Pitcher of the Year	Monica Abbott	Scrap Yard Dawgs
Gold Glove Presented by Rawlings	Chelsea Goodacre	USSSA Pride
Best Offensive Performance	Kelly Kretschman	USSSA Pride
Rookie of the Year	Bailey Landry	Texas Charge
Rally Spikes Award (Note: The Rally Spikes Award is given to the player with the most stolen bases)	Taylor Gadbois	Texas Charge
Home Run Award (Note: The Home Run Award goes to the player who hit the most home runs)	Shelby Pendley	USSSA Pride
Jennie Finch Award (Note: The Jennie Finch award is given to the player who best exemplifies the character and qualities of its famous namesake, and who is considered to positively impact the game both on and off the field.)	Bailey Landry	Texas Charge
Regular season championship Cup (Note: The Regular Season Championship Cup goes to the team with the best regular season record)	USSSA Florida Pride	
Coaching Staff of the Year	Lonni Alameda, Craig Snider, Travis Wilson	USSSA Florida Pride
Umpire of the Year	Craig Hyde	

== All-NPF Team ==
2017 All-NPF Team
Position	Name	Team
Catcher	Chelsea Goodacre	USSSA Pride
First base	Hallie Wilson	USSSA Pride
Second base	Emily Carosone	Chicago Bandits
Third base	Natalie Hernandez	Chicago Bandits
Shortstop	Shelby Pendley	USSSA Pride
Outfield	Taylor Gadbois	Texas Charge
Outfield	Kelly Kretschman	USSSA Pride
Outfield	Bailey Landry	Texas Charge
Designated player	Lauren Haeger	Texas Charge
At Large	AJ Andrews	Akron Racers
At Large	Allexis Bennett	Scrap Yard Dawgs
At Large	Brittany Cervantes	Scrap Yard Dawgs
At Large	Sahvanna Jaquish	Chicago Bandits
At Large	Shellie Robinson	Akron Racers
At Large	Sierra Romero	USSSA Pride
At Large	Nadia Taylor	Texas Charge
Pitcher	Monica Abbott	Scrap Yard Dawgs
Pitcher	Dallas Escobedo	Texas Charge
Pitcher	Keilani Ricketts	USSSA Pride
Pitcher	Jordan Taylor	USSSA Pride

== See also ==
- List of professional sports leagues
- List of professional sports teams in the United States and Canada
