= 2019 NPF Draft =

2019 NPF College Draft

General information
- Sport: Softball
- Date(s): April 15, 2019
- Time: 7:00 pm CST
- Location: Nashville, Tennessee
- Network(s): NPFTV

Overview
- 25 total selections
- League: National Pro Fastpitch
- Teams: 5
- First selection: Kelly Barnhill P Florida selected by Chicago Bandits
- Most selections: Chicago Bandits; Cleveland Comets (6)
- Fewest selections: Aussie Peppers; Beijing Eagles (4)

The 2019 NPF College Draft was the 16th annual collegiate draft for the National Pro Fastpitch. It took place April 15, 2019 in Nashville, Tennessee at Acme Feed & Seed, a downtown entertainment venue. It was available for internet viewing via NPFTV, the league's streaming platform. The Chicago Bandits selected Kelly Barnhill from Florida with the first overall pick in the draft.

== Draft Selections ==
Position key:
C = catcher; INF = infielder; SS = shortstop; OF = outfielder; UT = Utility infielder; P = pitcher; RHP = right-handed pitcher; LHP = left-handed pitcher
Positions will be listed as combined for those who can play multiple positions.

^{+}	Denotes player who has been selected to at least one All-NPF team
^{#}	Denotes player who has not played in the NPF

=== Round 1 ===
Pick	Player	Pos.	NPF Team	College
1	Kelly Barnhill	P	Chicago Bandits (Note: Cleveland Comets → Chicago Bandits December 13, 2018: Cleveland Comets traded their 1st overall draft pick in the 2019 NPF Draft, along with Jenna Lilley and cash considerations to the Chicago Bandits, in exchange for Sammy Marshall, Emily Carosone and Shelby Turnier.)	Florida
2	Amanda Lorenz	OF/1B	USSSA Pride (Note: Beijing Eagles → USSSA Pride April 20, 2018: Beijing Eagles traded their first pick in the 1st round of the 2019 NPF Draft to the USSSA Pride, in exchange for Angel Bunner.)	Florida
3	Sydney Romero^{+}	INF	USSSA Pride (Note: Aussie Spirit → USSSA Pride April 24, 2018: Aussie Spirit traded their first pick in the 1st round of the 2019 NPF Draft to the USSSA Pride, in exchange for Jordan Taylor.)	Oklahoma
4	Alyssa DiCarlo	SS	Chicago Bandits	Georgia
5	Amanda Sánchez	3B	Cleveland Comets (Note: USSSA Pride → Cleveland Comets March 8, 2019: USSSA Pride traded their fifth overall pick in the 2019 NPF Draft to the Cleveland Comets, in exchange for the Comets' first pick in the 1st round of the 2020 NFP Draft.)	LSU

=== Round 2 ===
Pick	Player	Pos.	NPF Team	College
6	Taylor McQuillin	LHP	Cleveland Comets	Arizona
7	Kendall Veach^{#}	INF/C	Beijing Eagles	Auburn
8	Taran Alvelo^{+}	RHP	Aussie Peppers	Washington
9	Caleigh Clifton	INF	Chicago Bandits	Oklahoma
10	Megan Good	RHP/INF	USSSA Pride	James Madison

=== Round 3 ===
Pick	Player	Pos.	NPF Team	College
11	Meghan King	LHP	Cleveland Comets	Florida State
12	Casey McCrackin	INF	Beijing Eagles	Auburn
13	Nicole Newman	RHP	Aussie Peppers	Drake University
14	Abbey Cheek^{+}	UT	Chicago Bandits	Kentucky
15	Lilli Piper	SS	Cleveland Comets (Note: USSSA Pride → Cleveland Comets May 24, 2018: USSSA Pride traded their 3rd round pick in the 2019 NPF Draft to the Cleveland Comets, in exchange for Megan Betsa.)	Ohio State

=== Round 4 ===
Pick	Player	Pos.	NPF Team	College
16	Emily Clark	C/UT	Cleveland Comets	Ohio State
17	Morgan Podany^{#}	OF	Beijing Eagles	Auburn
18	Riley Sartain^{#}	INF	Aussie Peppers	Texas A&M
19	Katie Reed^{#}	SS	Chicago Bandits	Kentucky
20	Shay Knighten	INF	USSSA Pride	Oklahoma

=== Round 5 ===
Pick	Player	Pos.	NPF Team	College
21	Tara Trainer^{#}	RHP	Aussie Peppers	Indiana
22	Bree Fornis^{#}	OF	Beijing Eagles	Auburn
23	Makayla Martin^{#}	RHP	Cleveland Comets	Auburn
24	Savannah Heebner	RHP/1B	Chicago Bandits	Houston
25	Keeli Milligan	OF	USSSA Pride	Louisiana

=== Draft notes ===
Round 1:

Round 3:
