= 2018 National Pro Fastpitch season =

2018 NPF Season
- League: National Pro Fastpitch
- Sport: softball
- Teams: 5

2018 NPF Draft
- Top draft pick: Paige Lowary P Oklahoma
- Picked by: Chicago Bandits

Regular Season
- Season champions: USSSA Pride
- Player of the Year: Brenna Moss
- Offensive Player of the Year: Brenna Moss
- Pitcher of the Year: Jolene Henderson
- Gold Glove Award: Jade Rhodes

Cowles Cup
- Champions: USSSA Pride
- Runners-up: Chicago Bandits

NPF seasons
- 2017 2019

The 2018 National Pro Fastpitch season was the 15th season of professional softball under the name National Pro Fastpitch (NPF) for the only professional women's softball league in the United States. From 1997 to 2002, NPF operated under the names Women's Pro Fastpitch (WPF) and Women's Pro Softball League (WPSL). Each year, the playoff teams battle for the Cowles Cup.

== Milestones and events ==
On October 12, 2017, it was reported the Texas Charge would be dissolving, effective immediately. The NPF did not make an announcement regarding the Charge, but all Charge players under contract were added to the league's transactions page as free agents.

In an arrangement similar to the Beijing Eagles', NPF announced in December 2017 that Softball Australia would be operating a 2018 expansion team, the Aussie Spirit.

On January 28, 2018, the Scrap Yard Dawgs announced via press release they would no longer be affiliated with the NPF. They indicated they would continue as an independent team. On the same day, Ohio.com reported that the Akron Racers would be replaced by a Chinese team, similar to the Beijing Eagles.

== Teams, cities and stadiums ==
Team	City	Stadium	Coaches
Aussie Spirit	Travelling Team		Head Coach: TBA; Assistants: TBA
Beijing Shougang Eagles	Travelling Team		Head Coach: Teresa Wilson; Assistants: Breanne Lewis, Thomas Hazelhurst
Chicago Bandits	Rosemont, Illinois (Chicago Area)	Ballpark at Rosemont	Head Coach: Stacey Nuveman Deniz; Assistant: TBA
Cleveland Comets	Travelling Team		Head Coach: TBA; Assistants: TBA
USSSA Pride	Viera, Florida	Space Coast Stadium	Head Coach: Lonni Alameda; Assistants: Travis Wilson, Craig Snider

== Player acquisition ==
=== College draft ===
The 2018 NPF College Draft will be the 13th annual collegiate draft for NPF.

=== Notable transactions ===
- Head Coaching Changes
  - The Bandits announced that coach Sharonda McDonald would not be returning for the 2018 season. On September 19, they announced that their new coach would be Olympian medalist and NCAA champion Stacey Nuveman Deniz. Nuveman Deniz held the NCAA home run record of 90 from 2002 to 2015, when Lauren Chamberlain broke it. She played in the NPF for the Arizona Heat in 2005.

== League standings ==
Team	GP	W	L	Pct.	GB
**USSSA Pride**	47	42	5	.894	-
**Chicago Bandits**	47	37	10	.787	5
**Aussie Spirit**	48	16	32	.333	26.5
**Beijing Shougang Eagles**	46	13	33	.283	28.5
**Cleveland Comets**	48	10	38	.208	32.5

=== Results table ===
2018 NPF records
Team	Spirit	Eagles	Bandits	Comets	Pride
Aussie Spirit	—	0-0	0-0	0-0	0-0
Beijing Shougang Eagles	0-0	—	0-0	0-0	0-0
Chicago Bandits	0-0	0-0	—	0-0	0-0
Cleveland Comets	0-0	0-0	0-0	—	0-0
USSSA Florida Pride	0-0	0-0	0-0	0-0	—

Legend
	Protest/Halted Game
	Postponement
**Bold**	Winning team

=== Game log ===
May/June

Date	Time	Visitor	Home	Venue	Score	Win	Loss	Save	Player of the Game	Attendance

July

Date	Time	Visitor	Home	Venue	Score	Win	Loss	Save	Player of the Game	Attendance

August

Date	Time	Visitor	Home	Venue	Score	Win	Loss	Save	Player of the Game	Attendance

== NPF Championship ==
NPF Semifinals
1
4
2
3

NPF Championship

2018 NPF Semifinals
Game	Date	Score	Winning Pitcher	Save	Losing Pitcher	Player of the Game	Series

2018 NPF Semifinals
Game	Date	Score	Winning Pitcher	Save	Losing Pitcher	Player of the Game	Series

2018 NPF Championship Series
Game	Date	Score	Winning Pitcher	Save	Losing Pitcher	Player of the Game	Series

=== Championship Game ===
Team	Top Batter	Stats.
USSSA Pride	Chelsea Goodacre & Hallie Wilson	1-1 RBI 2B
Chicago Bandits	Brenna Moss	3-4

Team	Pitcher	IP	H	R	ER	BB	SO
USSSA Pride	Jessica Burroughs (W)	4.1	4	0	0	0	1
USSSA Pride	Delanie Gourley	0.2	0	0	0	0	1
USSSA Pride	Jolene Henderson	2.0	1	0	0	1	2
Chicago Bandits	Aleshia Ocasio (L)	3.0	2	2	0	1	1
Chicago Bandits	Rachele Fico	1.1	3	1	1	1	0
Chicago Bandits	Ally Carda	0.1	1	1	0	0	1
Chicago Bandits	Danielle O'Toole	1.0	0	0	0	1	1
Chicago Bandits	Shelby Turnier	0.1	0	0	0	0	1

2018 NPF Championship Series MVP
Player	Club	Stats.
Shelby Pendley	USSSA Pride	.428 (3/7) 2RBIs HR 2BBs

== Annual awards ==
Award	Player	Team
Player of the Year Award	Brenna Moss	Chicago Bandits
Pitcher of the Year	Jolene Henderson	USSSA Pride
Gold Glove Presented by Rawlings	Jade Rhodes	Cleveland Comets
Offensive Player of the Year	Brenna Moss	Chicago Bandits
Rookie of the Year	Jessie Scroggins	Chicago Bandits
Stolen Bases Award (Note: The Stolen Bases Award is given to the player with the most stolen bases)	Brenna Moss	Chicago Bandits
Home Run Award (Note: The Home Run Award goes to the player(s) who hit the most home runs)	Emily Carosone	Chicago Bandits
Home Run Award	Lauren Chamberlain	USSSA Pride
Home Run Award	Megan Wiggins	USSSA Pride
Jennie Finch Award (Note: The Jennie Finch award is given to the player who best exemplifies the character and qualities of its famous namesake, and who is considered to positively impact the game both on and off the field.)	Nadia Taylor	Chicago Bandits
Regular Season Championship Cup (Note: The Regular Season Championship Cup goes to the team with the best regular season record)	USSSA Florida Pride	
Coaching Staff of the Year	Mike Stith, Cody Dent, Andrea Duran	USSSA Florida Pride
Umpire of the Year	Bill Gomoluch	

== All-NPF Team ==
2018 All-NPF Team
Position	Name	Team
Catcher	Kristyn Sandberg	Chicago Bandits
First base	Jade Rhodes	Cleveland Comets
Second base	Emily Carosone	Chicago Bandits
Third base	Bianka Bell	USSSA Pride
Shortstop	Shelby Pendley	USSSA Pride
Outfield	Brenna Moss	Chicago Bandits
Outfield	Sammy Marshall	Chicago Bandits
Outfield	Megan Wiggins	USSSA Pride
Designated player	Lauren Chamberlain	USSSA Pride
At Large	Hallie Wilson	USSSA Pride
At Large	Jessie Scroggins	Chicago Bandits
At Large	Victoria Draper	Beijing Shougang Eagles
At Large	Nadia Taylor	Chicago Bandits
At Large	Sierra Romero	USSSA Pride
Pitcher	Jolene Henderson	USSSA Pride
Pitcher	Shelby Turnier	Texas Charge
Pitcher	Keilani Ricketts	USSSA Pride
Pitcher	Jessica Burroughs	USSSA Pride

== See also ==
- List of professional sports leagues
- List of professional sports teams in the United States and Canada
