= List of Washington Huskies head softball coaches =

The Washington Huskies softball program is a college softball team that represents the University of Washington in the Pac-12 Conference in the National Collegiate Athletic Association. The team has had four head coaches (two were co-head coaches) since it started playing organized softball in the 1993 season.

== Key ==
General
#	Number of coaches (Note: A running total of the number of head coaches.)
GC	Games coached

Overall
OW	Wins
OL	Losses
OT	Ties
O%	Winning percentage

Conference (Note: Washington has played as a member of the Pac-12 Conference since establishing its program in 1993.)
CW	Wins
CL	Losses
CT	Ties
C%	Winning percentage

Postseason (Note: Postseason play involving the NCAA Division I Softball Championship or AIAW Women's College World Series.)
PA	Total Appearances (Note: Postseason appearances include seasons with NCAA Division I Softball Championship bids since the tournament began in 1982.)
PW	Total Wins
PL	Total Losses
WA	Women's College World Series appearances (Note: Women's College World Series appearances include seasons with WCWS bids since the tournament began in 1969.)
WW	Women's College World Series wins
WL	Women's College World Series losses

Championships
CC	Conference regular season
NC	National championships (Note: Women's College World Series sponsored by either the AIAW or NCAA.)

== Coaches ==
List of head softball coaches showing season(s) coached, overall records, conference records, postseason records, championships and selected awards (Note: Statistics correct as of the end of the 2021 NCAA Division I softball season.)
#	Name	Term	GC	OW	OL	OT	O%	CW	CL	CT	C%	PA	WA	CCs	NCs
1	Teresa Wilson	1993–2003	730	532	198	1	.728	161	109	0	.596	10	5	2	0
2	Scott Centala/Steve Dailey	2004	59	40	19	0	.678	10	10	0	.500	1	1	0	0
3	Heather Tarr	2005–present	965	704	260	1	.730	203	146	0	.582	16	7	2	1
