= Big Ten Conference Softball Pitcher of the Year =

Big Ten Conference Pitcher of the Year
- Awarded for: the most outstanding softball pitcher in the Big Ten Conference
- Country: United States

History
- First award: 1992
- Most recent: Jordy Frahm, Nebraska

The Big Ten Conference Pitcher of the Year is a college softball award given to the Big Ten Conference's most outstanding pitcher. The award has been given annually since 1992.

== Winners ==
Season	Player	School	Reference
1992	Kelly Kovach	Michigan	
1993	Kelly Forbis	Michigan	
1994	Karen Jackson	Iowa	
1995	Kelly Kovach	Michigan	
1996	Gina Ugo	Indiana	
1997	Kelly Holmes	Michigan	
1998	Sara Griffin	Michigan	
1999	Marie Barda	Michigan	
2000	Kristi Hanks	Iowa	
2001	Kristi Hanks (2)	Iowa	
2002	Marissa Young	Michigan	
2003	Lisa Birocci	Iowa	
2004	Nicole Motycka	Michigan	
2005	Jennie Ritter	Michigan	
2006	Eileen Canney	Northwestern	
2007	Eileen Canney (2)	Northwestern	
2008	Lauren Delaney	Northwestern	
2009	Nikki Nemitz	Michigan	
2010	Jordan Taylor	Michigan	
2011	Morgan Melloh	Indiana	
2012	Haylie Wagner	Michigan	
2013	Tatum Edwards	Nebraska	
2014	Sara Groenewegen	Minnesota	
2015	Megan Betsa	Michigan	
2016	Megan Betsa (2)	Michigan	
2017	Sara Groenewegen (2)	Minnesota	
2018	Meghan Beaubien	Michigan	
2019	Amber Fiser	Minnesota	
2021	Alex Storako	Michigan	
2022	Danielle Williams	Northwestern	
2023	Autumn Pease	Minnesota	
2024	Ashley Miller	Northwestern	
2025	Jordy Bahl	Nebraska	
2026	Jordy Frahm (2)	Nebraska	

== Winners by school ==
School	Winners	Years
Michigan	18	1987, 1988, 1989, 1992, 1993, 1995, 1996, 1998, 1999, 2001, 2003, 2004, 2010, 2011, 2012, 2014, 2016, 2021
Northwestern	9	1985, 2000, 2005, 2006, 2007, 2008, 2009, 2022, 2024
Minnesota	5	1986, 2015, 2017, 2018, 2023
Iowa	3	1990, 1991, 1997
Nebraska	3	2013, 2025, 2026
Indiana	1	1994
Ohio State	1	2002
Wisconsin	1	2019
Illinois	0	—
Maryland	0	—
Michigan State	0	—
Penn State	0	—
Purdue	0	—
Rutgers	0	—
