= Kasey Cooper =

Scrap Yard Fast Pitch – No. 13
- Third baseman
- Born: April 7, 1995 (age 30); Dothan, Alabama, U.S.
- Bats: Left Throws: Right

Teams
- Auburn Tigers (2014–2017); Scrap Yard Dawgs/Fast Pitch (2017–2018)

Career highlights and awards
- NPF Champion (2017)

Kasey Marie Cooper (born April 7, 1995) is an American former softball player and third baseman. Cooper played college softball at Auburn, in which entering her senior season held almost every offensive record for the Tigers. Cooper also played for the United States women's national softball team, and won a gold medal with the team at the 2016 Women's Softball World Championship and a silver medal at the 2016 World Cup of Softball.

== Early life ==
Cooper was born in Dothan, Alabama to parents Jeff and Peppi Cooper. Cooper's older sister, Kortney, played college ball at Troy University. Cooper attended Dothan High School and graduated in 2013. Cooper hit .569 with 22 home runs, 77 RBI and pitched with a 28-13 record, 1.35 ERA and 392 strikeouts from the circle as a senior.

== Auburn Tigers ==
After graduating from high school, Cooper attended Auburn University, from where she graduated in May of 2017. Cooper owns records in home runs, RBIs, batting average, and on-base percentage. Cooper was named co-NFCA National Freshman of the Year in 2014, along with Tennessee's Annie Aldrete, was the SEC Player of the Year in 2016, and was a First Team All-American in 2015 and 2016.

=== Stats ===
Year	G	AB	R	H	BA	RBI	HR	3B	2B	TB	SLG	BB	SO
2014	62	177	70	74	.418	77	18	0	10	138	.780%	43	7
2015	64	192	56	75	.391	64	18	0	14	143	.745%	49	25
2016	70	187	69	79	.422	83	21	1	19	163	.872%	71	15
2017	61	167	37	52	.311	46	10	3	9	97	.581%	49	21

== International career ==
Cooper was selected to play for the United States women's national softball team in 2016 and 2017. Cooper won a silver medal at the 2016 World Cup of Softball and a gold medal at the 2016 Women's Softball World Championship with the team.

=== Stats ===
Year	G	AB	R	H	BA	RBI	HR	3B	2B	TB	SLG	BB	SO
2016	16	34	10	10	.294	12	2	0	3	19	.559%	5	8
