= 2012 NPF Draft =

2012 NPF College Draft

General information
- Sport: softball
- Date(s): March 7, 2012
- Time: 5:00 PM CST
- Location: Memphis, Tennessee

Overview
- 20 total selections
- League: National Pro Fastpitch
- Teams: 4
- Expansion teams: 11
- First selection: Brittany Mack P LSU selected by USSSA Pride
- Most selections: USSSA Pride 7 picks
- Fewest selections: Carolina Diamonds, 3 picks

The 2012 NPF Draft is the ninth annual NPF Draft. It was held March 7, 2012, 5:00 PM CST in Memphis, TN at the Peabody Hotel for the 2012 season. It was streamed live on the NPF's website. The first selection was LSU's Brittany Mack, picked by the USSSA Pride. Athletes are not allowed by the NCAA to sign professional contracts until their collegiate seasons have ended.

== 2012 NPF Draft ==
Position key:
C = Catcher; UT = Utility infielder; INF = Infielder; 1B = First base; 2B =Second base SS = Shortstop; 3B = Third base; OF = Outfielder; RF = Right field; CF = Center field; LF = Left field; P = Pitcher; RHP = right-handed Pitcher; LHP = left-handed Pitcher; DP =Designated player
Positions are listed as combined for those who can play multiple positions.

^{+}	Denotes player who has been selected to at least one All-NPF team
^{#}	Denotes player who has not played in the NPF

=== Round 1 ===
Pick	Player	Pos.	NPF Team	College
1	Brittany Mack	P	USSSA Florida Pride	LSU
2	Kimi Pohlman^{+}	OF	Chicago Bandits	Washington
3	Lexy Bennett	SS	Akron Racers	Texas
4	Andrea Harrison^{#}	UT	USSSA Florida Pride	UCLA

=== Round 2 ===
Pick	Player	Pos.	NPF Team	College
5	Kristyn Sandberg^{+}	INF/C	USSSA Florida Pride	Georgia
6	Katie Schroeder^{#}	OF	Chicago Bandits	UCLA
7	Hillary Bach	P	Akron Racers	Arizona State
8	Valerie Arioto^{#}	UT/P	USSSA Florida Pride	California

=== Round 3 ===
Pick	Player	Pos.	NPF Team	College
9	Sara Plourde	P	Carolina Diamonds	UMass
10	Stephanie Ricketts^{#}	P	Chicago Bandits	Hawai'i
11	Amanda Chidester^{+}	3B	Akron Racers	Michigan (Note: Chidester did not play for the Racers, but did join the NPF in 2016 with the Scrap Yard Dawgs)
12	Michelle Moultrie^{#}	OF	USSSA Florida Pride	Florida

=== Round 4 ===
Pick	Player	Pos.	NPF Team	College
13	Kelsi Weseman	SS	Carolina Diamonds	Georgia Tech
14	Alicia Herron	SS	Akron Racers	Ohio State
15	Jen Mineau	P	Akron Racers	Fordham
16	Nikia Williams	UT	USSSA Florida Pride	Washington

=== Round 5 ===
Pick	Player	Pos.	NPF Team	College
17	Angel Bunner	P	Carolina Diamonds	Auburn
18	Adrienne Monka	1B	Chicago Bandits	Northwestern
19	Jamia Reed	OF	Akron Racers	California
20	Christi Orgeron	UT	USSSA Florida Pride	Louisiana–Lafayette (Note: Orgeron did not play for the Pride, but did join the NPF in 2016 with the Scrap Yard Dawgs)
