= Jolene Henderson =

American softball player (born 1991)

USSSA Pride – No. 54
- Pitcher
- Born: November 14, 1991 (age 34); Elk Grove, California, U.S.
- Bats: Right Throws: Right

Professional debut
- NCAA: 2010, for the California Golden Bears
- Team USA: 2014
- NPF: 2015, for the Texas Charge

Teams
- California Golden Bears (2010–2013); Team USA (2014); Denso – Japan (2014); Texas Charge (2015); USSSA Pride (2016–2023)

Career highlights and awards
- NPF Cowles Cup Champion (2018); 2× NPF Pitcher of the Year (2018, 2019); All-NPF Team (2019)
Medals
Women's softball
Representing United States
World Cup of Softball
Gold medal – first place	2014 Irvine	Team

Jolene Nicole Henderson (born November 14, 1991) is an American former collegiate All-American, professional All-Star, right-handed hitting softball pitcher and first baseman who is currently a softball assistant coach. Originally from Elk Grove, California, she was a starting pitcher for the California Golden Bears from 2010 to 2013. She is the career leader in wins for the Golden Bears and was a four-time All-Pac-12 selection. A former National Pro Fastpitch Pitcher of the Year, she was drafted third overall in 2013 and currently ranks among the top-10 in career wins, ERA, WHIP, and fielding percentage in the league. She played for the independent team, the USSSA Pride. She also played for the United States women's national softball team in 2014.

== Early life ==
Henderson played softball at Sheldon High School, graduating in 2009.

== College career ==
Henderson began her college career by being named a Second Team All-Pac-12 selection. She debuted on February 12, striking out two batters in a loss to the Texas A&M Aggies. On May 21, she pitched a perfect game against the Bucknell Bison, striking out 10 in five innings.

In her sophomore season, she was named First Team All-Pac-12, Pitcher of the Year, and a National Fastpitch Coaches' Association First Team All-American. She set a school record with 40 wins and also set career bests in strikeouts, ERA, shutouts, and innings pitched, helping her achieve a conference pitching Triple Crown. Henderson also threw two no-hitters. The Bears returned to the Women's College World Series led by Henderson, winning a game before losing to the Florida Gators on June 4.

As a junior, Henderson again received identical honors from the Pac-12 conference and the NFCA. She also achieved a career best in strikeout ratio (8.2) and batting average. On March 13, Henderson suffered a 10-inning loss to the Hawaii Rainbow Wahine but struck out a career best 16 batters. She helped the Bears to a No. 1 seed and reach the semifinals of the World Series before being eliminated on June 3 by the eventual champions, the Alabama Crimson Tide.

As a senior, Henderson again earned First-Team conference honors and was named to the NFCA Second Team. Henderson posted her best season WHIP, RBIs, and home runs, and tossed a no-hitter. In a victory against the Indiana Hoosiers on February 10, she began a 25-consecutive-win streak that was halted by the Arizona Wildcats on April 3. During the streak, she pitched 167.1 innings, allowing 93 hits, 16 earned runs, and 28 walks while striking out 170 batters for a 0.67 ERA and 0.72 WHIP, holding opponents to a .158 batting average. In a win that season, she defeated the UC Davis Aggies for her 100th career win. During the streak, on March 6, Henderson ended a victory over the Pacific Tigers by holding them scoreless for the final 1.2 innings, which began a streak where she did not allow a run for 42.1 consecutive innings before the Syracuse Orange scored a run in the 5th inning of another win on March 15. Across the 7 games within this scoreless streak, Henderson allowed 12 hits and 5 walks, struck out 40 batters, and totaled a 0.40 WHIP. In another win during her streak, she struck out 15 Sacramento State Hornets for a career high in a regulation game.

Henderson graduated as the Cal career wins leader and ranked among the top five in strikeouts, shutouts, and innings pitched. She also ranked among the top 10 in both the Pac-12 and NCAA Division I for her victories, ranking fourth and ninth respectively. In 2013, she graduated with a bachelor's degree in American Studies.

== Team USA (2014) ==
Henderson joined the United States women's national softball team in 2014. She helped the squad win a gold medal in the World Cup of Softball that year.

After the World Cup of Softball that year, she played professionally in Japan for a team named Denso.

== National Pro Fastpitch ==
=== Texas Charge (2015) ===
On January 27, 2015, Henderson became the first player to sign in franchise history for the new Texas Charge (then called the “Dallas Charge”). In her debut on June 15, Henderson pitched a game allowing six hits in a 4–1 win against the USSSA Pride. In a loss to the Pennsylvania Rebellion on July 14, Henderson struck out a career best 10 batters.

=== USSSA Pride (2016–2023) ===
On May 10, 2016, the USSSA Pride signed Henderson to a three-year contract. She has played for them since 2016. In 2017, Henderson began a win streak by posting three victories to end the year.

During the 2018 season, she was named the NPF Pitcher of the Year and helped lead her team to the Cowles Cup Championship. This contributed to a 14 consecutive win streak that began at the end of the 2017 season. For that streak, Henderson pitched 96.1 innings, allowing 47 hits, 8 earned runs, and 18 walks while striking out 72 batters for a 0.58 ERA and 0.67 WHIP.

During the 2019 season, she was again named the NPF Pitcher of the Year and won back-to-back Cowles Cup Championships with her team, contributing 5 shutout innings in the championship game. On July 1, Henderson defeated the Beijing Eagles with a perfect game.

== Coaching career ==
On September 25, 2018, Florida Gators softball head coach Tim Walton announced that Henderson would join the team as an assistant coach.

== Statistics ==
=== California Golden Bears ===
Year	W	L	GP	GS	CG	Sh	SV	IP	H	R	ER	BB	SO	ERA	WHIP
2010	20	10	37	26	20	6	3	185.2	146	66	48	66	192	1.81	1.14
2011	40	10	52	40	36	18	1	333.1	232	67	47	78	333	0.99	0.93
2012	38	4	49	38	36	17	4	282.1	200	60	52	78	332	1.29	0.98
2013	31	11	47	40	32	14	1	286.2	198	72	50	57	267	1.22	0.89
TOTALS	129	35	185	144	124	55	9	1088.0	776	265	197	279	1124	1.26	0.97

Year	G	AB	R	H	BA	RBI	HR	3B	2B	TB	SLG	BB	SO	SB	SBA
2010	63	127	12	19	.149	23	2	0	2	27	.212%	3	21	3	3
2011	54	92	10	20	.217	23	6	0	0	38	.413%	6	15	0	0
2012	58	67	11	19	.283	17	2	0	2	27	.403%	3	12	0	0
2013	50	113	18	28	.248	25	8	0	6	58	.513%	1	16	1	2
TOTALS	225	399	51	86	.216	88	18	0	10	150	.376%	13	64	4	5
