= Bailey Landry =

Scrap Yard Fast Pitch – No. 26
- Outfielder
- Born: September 25, 1995 (age 30); Prairieville, Louisiana, U.S.

Teams
- LSU Tigers (2014–2017); Texas Charge (2017); Scrap Yard Fast Pitch (2019–2020)

Career highlights and awards
- All-NPF Team (2017)

Bailey Landry (born September 25, 1995) was an American softball player for the Scrap Yard Fast Pitch. She attended East Ascension High School in Gonzales, Louisiana. She later attended Louisiana State University, where she was a two-time All-American for the LSU Tigers softball team. Landry led the Tigers to three Women's College World Series appearances in 2015, 2016 and 2017. She later went on to play professional softball with the Texas Charge of National Pro Fastpitch.
