= Joseph Guthrie (politician) =

American politician

Member of the New Hampshire House of Representatives from the Rockingham 15th district
- Incumbent
- Assumed office December 7, 2022
- In office December 4, 1996 – December 2, 1998

Member of the New Hampshire House of Representatives from the Rockingham 8th district
- In office December 6, 2006 – December 3, 2008

Member of the New Hampshire House of Representatives from the Rockingham 13th district
- In office December 3, 2014 – December 7, 2022

Personal details
- Born: 1929 (age 96–97)
- Party: Republican

Joseph Guthrie (born November 10, 1929) is an American politician. He serves as a Republican member for the Rockingham 15th district of the New Hampshire House of Representatives.

In 2022 Guthrie was 93 years old, marking him as the state's oldest legislator in New Hampshire's history.
