= Megan Betsa =

American softball pitcher and coach

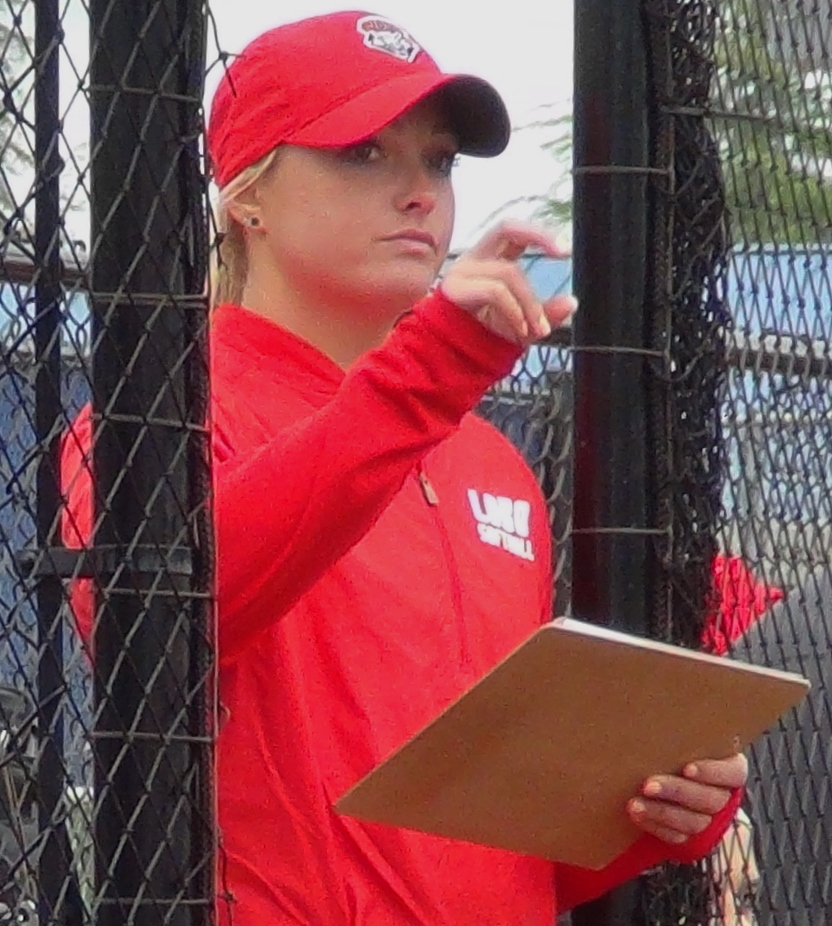
- Betsa in 2018 as New Mexico pitching coach

Biographical details
- Born: March 7, 1995 (age 31); McDonough, Georgia, U.S.

Playing career
- 2014–2017: Michigan
- 2017: Akron Racers
- 2018-2019: Cleveland Comets
- Position: Pitcher

Coaching career (HC unless noted)
- 2018: New Mexico (pitching)
- 2019: Chattanooga (pitching)

Accomplishments and honors

Championships
- Big Ten Tournament (2015); 3× Big Ten regular season (2014–2016)

Awards
- 3× NFCA second-team All-American (2015–2017); 2× Big Ten Pitcher of the Year (2015, 2016); 3× NFCA All-Great Lakes Region First Team (2015–2017); 3× first-team All-Big Ten (2015–2017); Second-team All-Big Ten (2014); Big Ten All-Tournament Team (2015)

Megan Renee Betsa (born March 7, 1995) is an American, former collegiate All-American, right-handed professional softball pitcher and coach. She is a former assistant coach at Chattanooga. She played college softball for Michigan in the Big Ten Conference, where she is the career strikeout ratio (10.7) leader for both the Big Ten and Michigan, and also ranks top-20 for the NCAA Division I. Betsa was selected seventh overall by the Akron Racers in the 2017 NPF Draft, and went on to play professionally for the now defunct Racers.

== Early life ==
Betsa grew up in McDonough, Georgia. Her father, Howard Betsa, played college basketball for the Tennessee Volunteers men's basketball program. Betsa attended Union Grove High School where she was selected as an all-state softball player all four years. She was also named the Georgia player and pitcher of the year in both 2011 and 2012. In 2013, she was named the Gatorade Softball Player of the Year.

== College career ==
Betsa enrolled at the University of Michigan in the fall of 2013. As a freshman during the 2014 college softball season, she compiled an 18–4 record with a 2.15 earned run average and 150 strikeouts.

In 2015, Betsa appeared in 46 games, 38 as a starter, and earned a 31–5 record with a 1.72 ERA and 333 strikeouts in 211 1/3 innings pitched. She received multiple honors during the 2015 season, including the following:

- On April 21, she was named National Pitcher of the Week after pitching three complete games, including a no-hitter.
- She was selected to the 2015 All-Big Ten Conference team and named the Big Ten pitcher of the Year.

In the 2016 season—as of May 10, 2016,—Betsa has appeared in 32 games, 23 as a starter, recording a 22–3 win–loss record with a 2.05 ERA and 236 strikeouts. In the first two games of the NCAA regional, she gave up only two runs. She threw a shutout victory against LSU in the Women's College World Series on June 3, 2016.

As a senior in 2017, Betsa earned first-team All-Big Ten and second-team NFCA All-America honors after reaching career bests in ERA (1.48), shutouts (12), strikeouts (412), and opposing batting average (.148). Betsa graduated from Michigan in April 2017 with a B.A. in sport management.

== Professional playing career ==
Betsa was the seventh overall selection in the 2017 NPF Draft, selected by the Akron Racers on April 24, 2017. On May 30, 2017, Betsa signed a three-year contract with the Racers. NPF named Betsa Rookie of the Week for the week of June 19 to 25, 2017, following her first pro complete game with a career high nine strikeouts in a 2–1 win over the Beijing Shougang Eagles on June 22.

== Coaching career ==
On August 25, 2017, Betsa joined Paula Congleton's inaugural coaching staff with University of New Mexico softball as pitching coach.

On August 20, 2018, Betsa became the pitching coach at Chattanooga under Frank Reed.

== Statistics ==
=== Michigan Wolverines ===
YEAR	W	L	GP	GS	CG	SHO	SV	IP	H	R	ER	BB	SO	ERA	WHIP
2014	17	4	31	23	12	5	0	130.1	88	48	41	67	150	2.20	1.19
2015	31	5	46	38	24	11	4	211.1	127	63	52	104	333	1.72	1.09
2016	28	5	43	34	20	9	5	204.2	115	68	59	113	306	2.02	1.11
2017	25	10	41	35	30	12	5	235.1	120	56	49	100	412	1.46	0.93
TOTALS	101	24	161	130	86	37	14	781.2	450	235	201	384	1201	1.80	1.07
