= Teresa Wilson =

American softball coach

Current position
- Title: Head coach

Coaching career (HC unless noted)
- 1986–1989: Oregon
- 1990–1991: Minnesota
- 1993–2003: Washington
- 2004–2008: Texas Tech
- 2008–2011: Arizona (pitching coach)
- 2012: Carolina Diamonds
- 2017–2018: Beijing Shougang Eagles

Accomplishments and honors

Awards
- Big Ten Coach of the Year (1991); 3× Pac-12 Coach of the Year (1989, 1996, 2000)

Teresa Wilson is an American, former collegiate softball pitcher and head coach. She played college softball at Missouri from 1980 to 1983. For her years of eligibility in the NCAA Division I, she is the career leader in ERA and WHIP for the Tigers, which also rank top-10 in the NCAA. She served as the softball head coach at Oregon, Minnesota, Washington, and Texas Tech. She was a coach for the Carolina Diamonds and Beijing Eagles of the National Pro Fastpitch (NPF).

== Coaching career ==
It was during her 11-year stint leading the University of Washington that she achieved her greatest coaching accomplishments. Her Huskies reached the National Collegiate Athletic Association (NCAA) Women's College World Series six times, making the national championship game in 1996 and 1999. However, UW removed Wilson as head coach amidst revelations the team physician had improperly distributed prescription drugs to the players. She sued the university in U.S. federal court, but the judge ruled against her claim of gender discrimination.

Wilson also led the University of Oregon to the Women's College World Series, in 1989.

She had a long coaching career in college softball, most recently as pitching coach for the Arizona Wildcats softball team from 2009 to 2011. Before that, she served as the head coach at Oregon, Minnesota, Washington, and Texas Tech, compiling 839 wins overall, 526 losses, and 1 tie, coaching athletes Heather Tarr, Jennifer Spediacci and Jenny Topping and achieving No. 1 ranking for Washington, as well as two national runner up finishes.

At a press conference in China, the 2017 NPF expansion team Beijing Shougang Eagles announced that Wilson would be their first head coach. She most recently served as a coach for the Carolina Diamonds and Beijing Eagles of National Pro Fastpitch (NPF).

== Statistics ==
Missouri Tigers
| YEAR | W | L | GP | GS | CG | SHO | SV | IP | H | R | ER | BB | SO | ERA | WHIP |
| 1982 | 25 | 11 | 37 | 30 | 30 | 18 | 0 | 249.1 | 113 | 25 | 12 | 25 | 221 | 0.33 | 0.55 |
| 1983 | 25 | 10 | 39 | 29 | 29 | 14 | 3 | 249.2 | 122 | 28 | 14 | 21 | 241 | 0.39 | 0.57 |
| TOTALS | 50 | 21 | 76 | 59 | 59 | 32 | 3 | 499.0 | 235 | 53 | 26 | 46 | 462 | 0.36 | 0.56 |

== Head coaching record ==
Record table
| Season | Team | Overall | Conference | Standing | Postseason |
|---|---|---|---|---|---|
Oregon Ducks (Northern Pacific Conference) (1986–1986)
| 1986 | Oregon | 17–30 | 2–8 | | |
Oregon Ducks (Pac-10 Conference) (1987–1989)
| 1987 | Oregon | 23–30 | 2–8 | 4th | |
| 1988 | Oregon | 32–26 | 9–11 | 3rd | |
| 1989 | Oregon | 52–18 | 13–7 | 2nd | |
| Oregon: | | 107–74 (.591) | 24–26 (.480) | | |
Minnesota Golden Gophers (Big Ten Conference) (1990–1991)
| 1990 | Minnesota | 31–32 | 12–12 | | |
| 1991 | Minnesota | 48–27 | 20–4 | | |
| Minnesota: | | 79–59 (.572) | 32–16 (.667) | | |
Washington Huskies (Pac-10 Conference) (1993–2003)
| 1993 | Washington | 31–27 | 7–18 | 7th | |
| 1994 | Washington | 44–21 | 14–10 | 3rd | |
| 1995 | Washington | 50–23 | 17–11 | 3rd | |
| 1996 | Washington | 59–9 | 23–4 | 1st | Women’s College World Series |
| 1997 | Washington | 50–19 | 16–11 | 3rd | Women’s College World Series |
| 1998 | Washington | 52–15 | 19–9 | 2nd | Women’s College World Series |
| 1999 | Washington | 51–18 | 15–12 | 3rd | Women’s College World Series |
| 2000 | Washington | 62–9 | 17–4 | 1st | Women’s College World Series |
| 2001 | Washington | 40–23 | 11–10 | T-3rd | |
| 2002 | Washington | 46–18 | 13-8 | 3rd | |
| 2003 | Washington | 47–16-1 | 9-12 | 4th | |
| Washington: | | 532–198 (.729) | 161–109 (.596) | | |
Texas Tech Red Raiders (Big 12 Conference) (2005–2008)
| 2005 | Texas Tech | 23–25 | 3-15 | 9th | |
| 2006 | Texas Tech | 19–35 | 4-13 | 9th | |
| 2007 | Texas Tech | 24–27 | 4-12 | 8th | |
| 2008 | Texas Tech | 23–36 | 8-10 | 5th | |
| Texas Tech: | | 89–123 (.420) | 19–50 (.275) | | |
| Total: | | 824–484 (.630) | | | |
National champion Postseason invitational champion Conference regular season champion Conference regular season and conference tournament champion Division regular season champion Division regular season and conference tournament champion Conference tournament champion
