= Craig Snider =

American softball coach

Current position
- Title: Head Coach
- Team: Knoxville Miracle

Biographical details
- Born: Franklin, Kentucky, U.S.

Coaching career (HC unless noted)
- 2001–2003: Lindsey Wilson College (asst.)
- 2004–2005: Centenary (asst.)
- 2005–2006: Oklahoma (GA)
- 2007–2010: Stephen F. Austin (asst.)
- 2011–2019: Florida State (asst.)
- 2020–2022: Texas A&M (asst.)
- 2023–2024: Texas Tech
- 2025–2026: Tennessee (asst.)

Head coaching record
- Overall: 60–43 (.583)

Craig Snider is an American softball coach who is currently an assistant coach at Tennessee. He previously served as head coach at Texas Tech.

== Coaching career ==
=== Texas A&M ===
On June 6, 2019, Texas A&M added Snider to the softball staff as an assistant coach under head coach Jo Evans.

=== Texas Tech ===
On June 20, 2022, Snider was named head coach at Texas Tech. In two seasons as head coach, he posted a 60–43 record, and a 13–29 record in Big 12 play.

=== Tennessee ===
On June 9, 2024, Snider was named assistant coach at Tennessee.

== Personal life ==
Snider is engaged to current Tennessee assistant coach Stephanie Sanders. They will get married on June 14, 2024.

== Head coaching record ==
=== College ===
Record table
Season	Team	Overall	Conference	Standing	Postseason
Texas Tech Red Raiders (Big 12 Conference) (2023–2024)
2023	Texas Tech	31–22	5–13	T–6th	
2024	Texas Tech	29–21	8–16	8th	
Texas Tech:		60–43 (.583)	13–29 (.310)		
Total:		60–43 (.583)			
National champion Postseason invitational champion Conference regular season champion Conference regular season and conference tournament champion Division regular season champion Division regular season and conference tournament champion Conference tournament champion
