= Lauren Haeger =

American softball player (born 1992)

Personal information
- Full name: Lauren Elizabeth Anna Haeger
- Nickname: Haegar Bomb
- Born: September 3, 1992 (age 33) Peoria, Arizona, U.S.
- Height: 5 ft 11 in (180 cm)

Sport
- Sport: Softball
- Position: Pitcher; First baseman
- Team: Dallas Charge (2015–present); Florida Gators (2012–15); Deer Valley Skyhawks (2008–11)
Medal record
Women's Softball
Representing United States
Gold medal – first place	ISF Championship, Cape Town, 2011

Lauren Elizabeth Anna Haeger (born September 3, 1992) is an American professional softball pitcher and first baseman with the Dallas Charge of National Pro Fastpitch (NPF). After being named a member of the 2011 MaxPreps Softball All-American Team and earning a gold medal at the III Pan American (18-under) Games in 2010, Haegar played softball at the University of Florida.

She was the third collegiate softball player to be recognized as both the Most Outstanding Player of the Women's College World Series and the USA Softball Collegiate Player of the Year. In 2015, she became the first player in the history of college softball to record 70 home runs as a hitter and 70 wins as a pitcher; no other player has registered even 60 home runs and 60 wins. Haeger was drafted by the Dallas Charge in the 2015 NPF Draft and reported to the team that June.

== Early life ==
Haeger was born in Peoria, Arizona, to Fred and Kathleen Haeger. She had a brother named Matthew. Her father is an assistant softball coach at Deer Valley High School. At Deer Valley, Haeger played one year and lettered in basketball and played all four years of both volleyball and softball.

Haeger broke Arizona's state hitting record with 48 home runs in one season and was named to the 2011 MaxPreps Softball All-American Team. She received First Team All-State honors in two seasons. Haeger pitched for Team USA in the III Pan American Championships in 2010, where she hit for a .400 batting average. She was on the International Softball Federation championship team, hitting .500 with eight RBIs.

== College ==
Haeger began her career at the University of Florida in 2011 with a 15-5 win–loss record in her 27 appearances, throwing 6 shutouts. She was named the first team utility/pitcher for NFCA All-Southeast Region and ranked seventh in the Southeastern Conference (SEC) with a 1.85 earned run average (ERA) and 129 strikeouts during her 124.2 innings. At the plate, Haeger led her team with ten doubles, 14 home runs, 52 RBIs, 36 walks, and a consecutive on-base streak of 18.

Following her 2012 SEC All-Tournament Team and All-Freshman selection, Haeger went 16–2 with 119 strikeouts in 128.1 innings and an ERA of 2.35. She also set a career high of innings pitched with 7.2 against the University of Tennessee on March 16. She won six games against Top 25 teams. Haeger was ranked seventeenth in the country for home runs, with a team high 18 and batted .319 with 70 RBIs, 46 walks, and an on-base streak of 24 games, a team best. She led the SEC in RBIs and was third in walks. She also set the University of Florida's record for the most intentional walks in a season (5) and the single game RBI record (7) against their rival University of South Florida at Regionals. To close out her sophomore season, Haeger was named First Team All-SEC and First Team NFCA All-Southeast Region, along with her first All-American title.

As a junior, Haeger remained consistent with 24 circle appearances and 13 starts. She ended the season with a record of 10-3 and ranked fourth with an ERA of 1.79. Haeger also pitched 98 innings with 69 strikeouts, an opponent's batting average of .190, and a no-hitter against the University of Wisconsin on February 9, allowing only three walks while striking out 11. She remained a force at the plate all season, leading the Gators to victory in the 2014 Women's College World Series. Haeger again received First Team NFCA All-Southeast Region honors and batted .317 with six doubles, leading her team in RBIs (67) and walks (43).

In her final season as a Gator, Haeger finished with an overall record of 32–2 with her lowest collegiate ERA of 1.23, ranked fourth in the country, and 24 consecutive victories, another Gator record. She also beat her previous home run record of 18, hitting 19 that year. Haeger also set both the regular season career home run record (66), with a grand slam against the University of Georgia, and the all-time RBI record (222), which occurred on March 6 against the University of Arizona. She became the only collegiate pitcher in history to win 70+ games and to hit 70+ home runs. Before Haeger, no player but Babe Ruth and her had won 60 games and hit 60 home runs. Haeger was 15th in the country with 71 RBIs and she hit .433 during the 2015 NCAA Division I Softball Championship.

Haeger was nominated for ESPY Awards in the Best Female Collegiate Athlete and Best Championship Performance categories in 2015. She joined Danielle Lawrie and Keilani Ricketts as the only players in college softball history to receive both the USA Softball Collegiate Player of the Year and Women's College World Series Most Outstanding Player. She won the Honda Sports Award for Softball, SEC Female Athlete of the Year and SEC Pitcher of the Year, and was NFCA All-Southeast Region for the third year in a row. Haeger is ranked amongst the all-time leaders in ERA and wins.

== Professional career ==
Haeger plays professional softball with the Dallas Charge of National Pro Fastpitch. She was selected with the 21st pick of the 2015 NPF College Draft. She finished her first season with a batting average of .206 in 35 games. She had an ERA of 3.01 and led the team's pitchers with six wins, 86 strikeouts, 19 games pitched and 97 2/3 innings pitched.

On August 11, 2016, Lauren Haeger pitched a no-hitter, beating the Chicago Bandits 5–0. The only Bandit to reach base did so via a Charge fielding error.

== Personal life ==
Haeger's favorite athletes are Tim Tebow, Michael Jordan, and Albert Pujols. She also has a tattoo of a sunflower on her arm to honor Heather Braswell, an honorary member of the Gators softball team who died several years after being diagnosed with brain cancer.

== Career statistics ==
=== Professional (NPF) ===
Dallas Charge
YEAR	W	L	GP	GS	CG	Sh	SV	IP	H	R	ER	BB	SO	ERA	WHIP
2015	6	7	19	11	8	2	1	97.2	86	48	42	29	86	3.01	3

=== College ===
University of Florida
Year	W	L	GP	GS	CG	Sh	SV	IP	H	R	ER	BB	SO	ERA	WHIP
2012	15	5	61	61	11	6	2	124.2	95	42	33	60	129	1.85	2
2013	16	2	67	64	9	2	2	128.1	111	50	43	46	119	2.35	5
2014	10	3	66	65	7	3	1	98,0	67	29	25	20	69	1.79	0
2015	32	2	67	67	25	12	0	222.1	145	41	39	43	214	1.23	1
TOTALS	73	12	261	257	52	23	5	573.1	418	162	140	169	531	1.71	8

University of Florida
YEAR	AB	R	H	BA	RBI	HR	3B	2B	SLG	BB	SO	SB	SBA
2012	168	27	54	.321	52	14	0	10	-	37	37	2	3
2013	191	42	61	.319	70	18	0	13	-	34	34	2	3
2014	199	43	63	.317	67	20	0	6	-	26	26	6	6
2015	187	150	65	.348	71	19	0	9	.701%	23	23	2	3
TOTALS	7451	162	243	.326	260	71	0	38	-	175	120	12	15

=== High school ===
Deer Valley High School - Pitching
YEAR	W	L	GP	GS	CG	Sh	SV	IP	H	R	ER	BB	SO	ERA	WHIP
2011	26	5	31					208	67	37		37		.44	7
2010	14	2	8					106	49	25	12	23		.79	1
2009	14	3	17		11	0		121	48	12	9	13	6	.52	0
2008	10	2	2					78	30	15	10	17		.90	3
TOTALS	64	12	58		11	0		513	194	89	44	90		.60	11

Deer Valley High School - Hitting
YEAR	AB	R	H	BA	RBI	HR	3B	2B	SLG	BB	SO
2011	119	50	64	.538	51	20	0	12	1.142	25	2
2010	106	44	59	.557	58	15	1	16	1.150	20	2
2009	110	30	51	.464	30	9	1	5	.772	12	6
2008	58	20	26	.448	21	3	1	8	.810	1	6
TOTALS	393	144	200	.509	160	47	3	41	.992	58	16
