= Haylie Wagner =

American softball player

- Pitcher
- Born: April 7, 1993 (age 33); Orange, California

Teams
- Michigan (2012–2015); Pennsylvania Rebellion (2015); Chicago Bandits (2017–present)

Career highlights and awards
- Big Ten Freshman of the Year (2012); Big Ten Pitcher of the Year (2012)

Haylie Marie Wagner (born April 7, 1993) is an American softball pitcher for the Chicago Bandits of National Pro Fastpitch. From 2012 to 2015, she was a left-handed pitcher for the Michigan Wolverines softball team. She was unanimously selected the 2012 Big Ten Conference Softball Pitcher of the Year after compiling a 32–7 record and a 1.53 earned run average (ERA) in her freshman year. She finished her college career with a 100–18 win record and a 1.82 ERA. Since 2015, Wagner has pitched for the Pennsylvania Rebellion, but the club was dissolved in 2017.

== Early life ==
Wagner was born in 1993 and grew up in Orange, California. She attended El Modena High School, graduating in 2011. She was selected as an all-country player three consecutive years from 2009 to 2011.

== University of Michigan ==
Wagner enrolled in the University of Michigan College of Literature, Science, and the Arts in the fall of 2011. As a freshman in the spring of 2012, Wagner appeared in 50 games, including 34 as a starter. She compiled a win–loss record of 32–7 with a 1.53 ERA and 159 strikeouts. Her 32 wins set a single-season freshman record at Michigan. Following an outstanding season, she was named Big Ten Conference Freshman of the Year. At the end of the 2012 season, she was selected unanimously as the Big Ten Conference Pitcher of the Year.

As a sophomore in 2013, Haylie Wagner was named to the Top 50 Watch List for the 2013 USA Softball Collegiate Player of the Year. However, she missed the first three weeks of the season with a back injury. After returning to the line-up, she appeared in 30 games, including 22 as a starter. On March 9, 2013, she threw a one-hitter against Illinois. She returned to Orange County, California to play for Michigan in the Judi Garman Classic and threw eight shutout innings in a victory over North Carolina State. At the time, Michigan head coach Carol Hutchins told the Orange County Register: "We feel like she has the chance to be a very special player. Just how special? We'll have to wait and see about that. But we recruited her for a reason." Wagner compiled a 19–3 record in 2013 with a 2.50 ERA and 102 strikeouts. She was selected as a second-team All-Big Ten Conference pitcher at the end of the 2013 season.

In 2014, Wagner appeared in 37 games, 24 as a starter, and compiled a 24–5 record with a 1.82 ERA and 122 strikeouts.

In 2015, Wagner appeared in 38 games, 26 as a starter, and compiled a 25–3 record with a 1.75 ERA and 135 strikeouts in 172.1 innings pitched. She was selected to the 2015 All-Big Ten Conference team.

== Pennsylvania Rebellion ==
In June 2015, Wagner was signed by the Pennsylvania Rebellion. In October 2015, she extended her contract through the 2017 season.
