= Angel Bunner =

American softball player

Current position
- Title: Pitcher
- Conference: NPF

Biographical details
- Born: November 2, 1989 (age 36); Fairless Hills, Pennsylvania

Playing career
- 2008–2012: Auburn
- 2012: Carolina Diamonds
- 2013: New York Comets
- 2014–2015: Pennsylvania Rebellion
- 2016: Chicago Bandits
- 2017: USSSA Pride
- 2018–2019: Beijing Eagles

Coaching career (HC unless noted)
- 2014: Northwestern State (volunteer asst.)
- 2015: Gardner-Webb (asst.)

Administrative career (AD unless noted)
- 2013: Auburn (dir. of ops.)

Accomplishments and honors

Championships
- Cowles Cup (2016)

Awards
- SEC All-Tournament (2011)

Angelique "Angel" Bunner (born November 2, 1989) is an American, former professional softball pitcher. Bunner pitched collegiately for Auburn from 2008 to 2012. In the 2012 NPF Draft, she was drafted seventeenth overall by the Carolina Diamonds. During her professional career in the National Pro Fastpitch, she played for the USSSA Pride, Chicago Bandits, Pennsylvania Rebellion, Carolina Diamonds, NY/NJ Comets and most recently the Beijing Eagles. She currently ranks in career innings pitched and won a Cowles Cup championship with the Bandits in 2016.

== Early life ==
Bunner was born in Fairless Hills, Pennsylvania to George and Debbie Bunner. Bunner has two older siblings. She attended at Conwell–Egan Catholic High School the same school American football running back Steve Slaton attended. At Conwell–Egan Catholic High School, Bunner lettered four times in softball and three in field hockey. Bunner currently has Conwell-Egan records for wins (70), strikeouts (818) and shutouts (38).

== Career ==
=== College career ===
Bunner played college softball at Auburn from 2008 to 2012. She set the third-best single-season ERA at 1.53 in 2011, set ninth-best single-season batting average against at .205 in 2011, tied for seventh-most wins in single-season with 16 in 2011, and set single-season record for fewest walks with 22 in 2012.

Bunner recorded eight wins in her freshman season; red shirted her sophomore year due to injury; 7 in her second full season; 16 in her third full year; and 13 in her last season for a career total of 44 wins. In that stretch, Bunner struck out a total of 326 batters.

After Bunner finished college she ranked top ten in several categories, and currently ranks as fourth in WHIP, seventh in ERA, and ninth in wins, shutouts and innings.

=== Professional career ===
Bunner was drafted seventeenth overall by the Carolina Diamonds in the 2012 NPF Draft. She was the first Auburn softball player to be taken in the NPF draft.

In February 2013, it was announced that the team had folded and the roster would now be picked up by the NPF expansion team, the New York/New Jersey Comets.

Bunner joined the Chicago Bandits midway through the 2016 season. She was the winning pitcher, pitching in the first six innings of game 3 of the championship series against the USSSA Pride.

== Personal life ==
In 2016, Bunner became a teacher at Belleview High School in Belleview, Florida.

== Career statistics ==
Auburn Tigers
YEAR	W	L	GP	GS	CG	SHO	SV	IP	H	R	ER	BB	SO	ERA	WHIP
2008	8	1	27	4	2	1	2	84.0	72	39	30	17	67	2.50	1.06
2010	7	9	29	15	2	0	1	92.2	104	58	44	22	48	3.32	1.36
2011	16	7	33	20	10	4	2	156.0	116	44	34	43	124	1.53	1.02
2012	13	5	29	16	11	5	1	126.1	99	47	39	22	87	2.16	0.96
TOTALS	44	21	118	55	25	10	6	459.0	391	188	147	104	326	2.24	1.08

National Pro Fastpitch
YEAR	W	L	GP	GS	CG	Sh	SV	IP	H	R	ER	BB	SO	ERA
2012	5	7	17	15	8	0	1	89	102	66	51	35	41	4.01
2013	3	11	21	15	8	0	0	102	153	107	92	77	56	6.31
2014	2	6	19	8	2	0	0	68.0	82	45	34	33	32	3.50
Totals	10	24	57	38	18	0	1	259	307	218	177	145	129	4.78

National Pro Fastpitch Playoffs
Year	W	L	GP	GS	CG	Sh	SV	IP	H	R	ER	BB	SO	ERA
2012 playoffs	0	1	1	1	0	0	0	3	5	5	4	1	2	9.33
2013 playoffs	0	0	1	0	0	0	0	1.1	1	0	0	1	0	0.00
2014 playoffs	W	L	GP	GS	--	--	0	IP	H	R	ER	BB	SO	ERA
Totals	0	1	2	1	0	0	0	4.1	6	5	4	2	2	6.83

Conwell-Egan High School
Year	W	L	GP	GS	CG	Sh	SV	IP	H	R	ER	BB	SO	ERA
TOTALS	70	L	GP	GS	CG	38	SV	IP	H	R	ER	BB	818	ERA
