= Emily Carosone =

American softball player and coach

USSSA Pride – No. 15
- Second baseman
- Born: 14 October 1993 (age 32); Orlando, Florida, U.S.

Teams
- Chicago Bandits (2016–2018); USSSA Pride (2019–2020)

Career highlights and awards
- All-NPF Team (2018)
Medals
Women's softball
Representing Italy
Women's Softball European Championship
Gold medal – first place	2021 Castions di Strada	Team

Emily Patricia Carosone (born 14 October 1993) is an Italian-American former professional softball player and coach. Carosone later joined the Italy women's national softball team and competed at the 2020 Summer Olympics.

== Life ==
She attended Pine Castle Christian High School in Orlando. She later played for and owns the batting crown for the Auburn Tigers softball team in the Southeastern Conference. Carosone led the Tigers to two Women's College World Series appearances and a runner-up finish in 2016. She was later drafted #22 overall and went on to play softball with the Chicago Bandits of the National Pro Fastpitch and joined the Cleveland Comets of the league in 2019. She currently is an assistant coach for her alma mater.

== Statistics ==
Auburn Tigers
YEAR	G	AB	R	H	BA	RBI	HR	3B	2B	TB	SLG	BB	SO	SB	SBA
2013	53	157	36	61	.388	35	4	1	14	89	.567%	14	15	13	15
2014	61	158	70	62	.392	34	9	1	11	102	.645%	31	11	3	3
2015	67	194	88	85	.438	80	18	0	18	157	.809%	39	14	0	1
2016	70	193	73	77	.399	67	13	0	13	129	.668%	41	20	6	6
TOTALS	251	702	267	285	.406	216	44	2	56	477	.679%	125	60	22	25
