= Danielle O'Toole-Trejo =

American softball player

Danielle O'Toole OLY
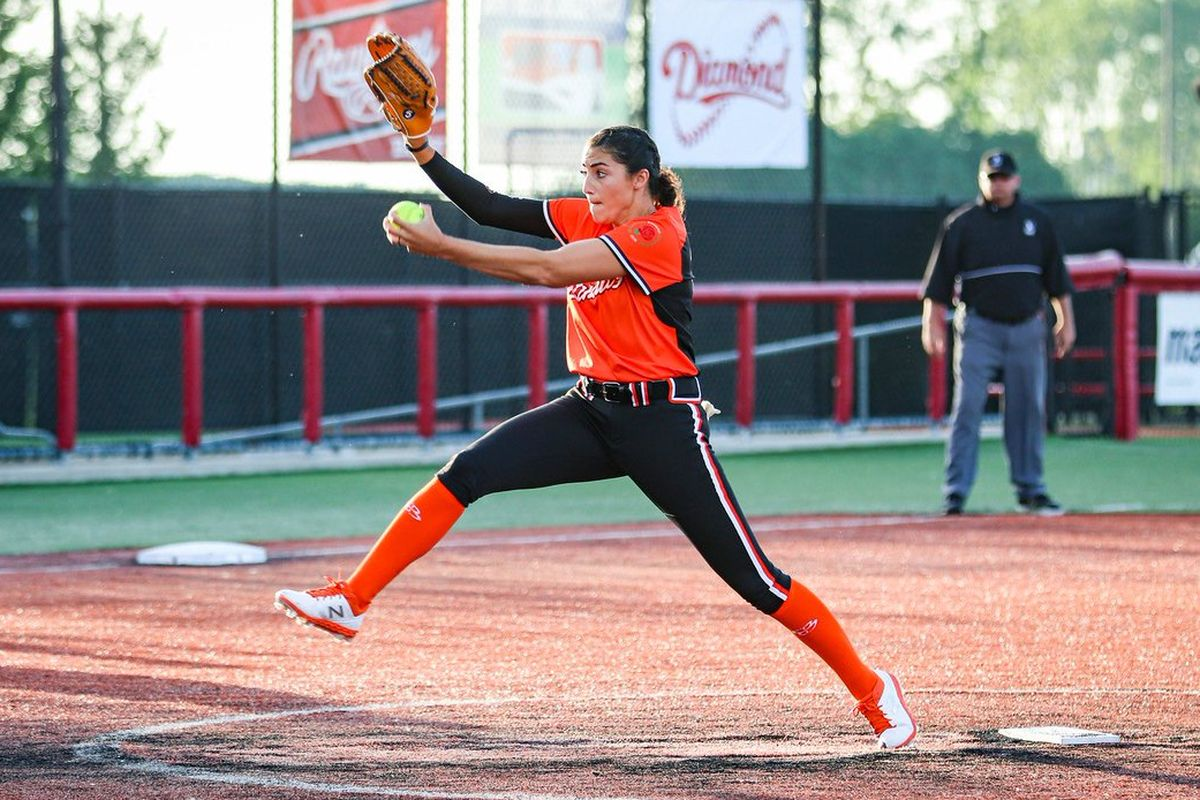
- O'Toole in 2019

Personal information
- Full name: Danielle Denise O'Toole-Trejo
- Born: July 7, 1994 (age 32)

Sport
- Country: United States of America
- Sport: Softball
- College team: Arizona Wildcats
- Team: Chicago Bandits
- Turned pro: 2016
- Retired: 2022

Danielle Denise O'Toole-Trejo (born July 7, 1994) is a former professional softball pitcher and current assistant coach for Stanford. She played college softball for San Diego State and Arizona. She graduated and was selected eighth overall in the National Pro Fastpitch draft by the Chicago Bandits, which she has played with on and off for three seasons. She played in the inaugural season of the Athletes Unlimited Softball league.

She has also played internationally for Team USA, before joining Team Mexico. She helped Team Mexico place fourth at the 2020 Summer Olympics.

== Playing career ==
O'Toole was named Mountain West Conference Freshman of The Year and First-Team All-Conference. She debuted on February 8 losing to the Stephen F. Austin Lumberjacks and throwing four innings with six strikeouts. On March 14, O'Toole set a career best for strikeouts in a regulation game with 9 whiffs against the Bryant Bulldogs in a victory. She also began a career best shutout streak in that game that went on for 22 innings, during which the Aztec struck out 18, allowed 21 hits and two walks for a 1.04 WHIP. For her sophomore year, O'Toole earned MWC Pitcher of The Year, her second all conference honors and set a career best in victories (then school record) and innings pitched. O'Toole currently ranks top-10 for San Diego in wins, strikeouts and shutouts, while holding the winning percentage record for a career.

O'Toole redshirted in 2015 after transferring to play for the Arizona Wildcats and as a junior in 2016 was named All-Pac-12 and posted her best shutouts total. For her final year, O'Toole was named a National Fastpitch Coaches Association First Team All American and Pac 12 Pitcher of the Year, accomplishing the rare feat of being recognized by two conferences for her efforts on the mound. She set personal career bests in strikeouts, ERA, WHIP, strikeout ratio (6.7) and threw a no hitter.

She led the Wildcats in a return to the No. 1 ranking and a Pac 12 Championship. Starting on March 3-April 13, she pitched 14 consecutive wins for a career highlight. During the streak she gave up 56 hits, 13 earned runs, 16 walks and fanned 88 in 92.1 innings for a 0.78 WHIP and 0.99 ERA. In the only non-decision of the streak vs. the Oregon State Beavers, O'Toole set a career best with 10 strikeouts in just four innings of work on March 19. In her next game on March 24, she no hit the Washington Huskies, walking one and striking out 8 batters. On May 20 in the Regionals of the NCAA Tournament, she threw a 7 strikeout, 1-hit shutout to tally her 100th career victory over the South Carolina Gamecocks. O'Toole made her final appearance in the Super Regionals against the Baylor Bears, throwing six innings in a loss on May 28.

== Team Mexico ==
At the 2020 Summer Olympics, O'Toole threw 17.0 innings for Team Mexico, allowing three earned runs, 13 hits and two walks for a 1.23 ERA and 0.88 WHIP, with seven strikeouts and no errors on the mound. Mexico placed fourth and lost in the bronze medal game to Team Canada 3–2. O'Toole threw the complete game loss for her third appearance at the Olympics.

== Coaching career ==
O'Toole began her coaching career as the pitching coach for San Diego for two seasons in 2018 and 2019. She then spent three seasons as a pitching coach for Cal State Fullerton. On July 14, 2023, she was named the pitching coach for California. On July 15, 2024, she was named an assistant coach for Stanford.

== Personal life ==
O'Toole married Tony Trejo on September 7, 2019. She made an appearance in the film Jackass Forever.

== Statistics ==
San Diego State & Arizona
| YEAR | W | L | GP | GS | CG | SHO | SV | IP | H | R | ER | BB | SO | ERA | WHIP |
| 2013 | 14 | 7 | 35 | 24 | 13 | 3 | 1 | 155.0 | 150 | 51 | 40 | 35 | 121 | 1.80 | 1.19 |
| 2014 | 31 | 10 | 48 | 36 | 26 | 7 | 1 | 256.2 | 239 | 83 | 70 | 45 | 196 | 1.91 | 1.11 |
| 2016 | 26 | 12 | 43 | 37 | 24 | 9 | 3 | 216.0 | 179 | 93 | 67 | 49 | 192 | 2.17 | 1.05 |
| 2017 | 30 | 5 | 38 | 35 | 25 | 9 | 1 | 219.0 | 148 | 49 | 38 | 40 | 210 | 1.21 | 0.86 |
| TOTALS | 101 | 34 | 164 | 132 | 88 | 28 | 6 | 846.2 | 716 | 276 | 215 | 169 | 719 | 1.78 | 1.04 |
