= Jordan Taylor (softball) =

American softball player & coach (born 1988)

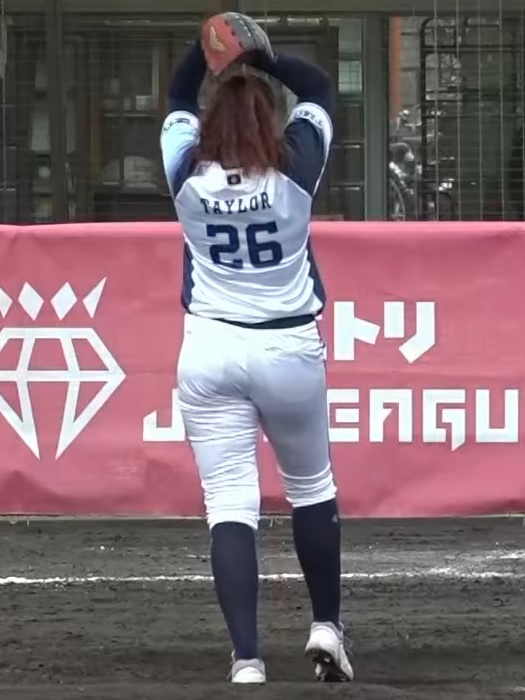

Biographical details
- Born: October 24, 1988 (age 38); Santa Clarita, California, U.S.

Playing career
- 2008–2011: Michigan
- 2011–2017: USSSA Pride
- 2012–2013: Denso
- 2017–2022: Toda Medics
- 2018: Aussie Spirit
- Position: Pitcher

Coaching career (HC unless noted)
- 2014–2015: Boston University (Volunteer asst.)
- 2016–2017: Loyola-Chicago (asst.)

Accomplishments and honors

Championships
- As a player: 4× Big Ten Regular Season Champions (2008–2011); As an assistant: Patriot League Regular Season Champions (2014)

Awards
- As a player: 3× ALl-NPF Team Selection; 2× Crowles Cup Champion (2013–2014); 3× All-NPF Team Pitcher (2015–2017); 3× NFCA All-American Second Team (2008, 2010, 2011); 4× NFCA All-Great Lakes Region First Team; Big Ten Pitcher of the Year (2010); Big Ten Freshmen of the Year (2008); 3× All-Big Ten Conference First Team (2008, 2010, 2011)
Medal record
Women's softball
Representing United States
Pan American Games
Gold medal – first place	2011 Guadalajara	Team

Jordan Lee Taylor (born October 24, 1988) is an American, former collegiate All-American, 3-time professional All-Star right-handed softball pitcher originally from Santa Clarita, California. She played for the Michigan Wolverines softball team from 2008–2011 and Team USA. She was drafted #11 and played from 2011-18 in the National Pro Fastpitch where she is currently the career leader in saves. She is the career Big Ten Conference career leader in strikeouts and also ranks in numerous records for the Wolverines, the conference and in the NCAA Division I.

== Valencia ==
Taylor played high school softball at Valencia High School in Valencia, Santa Clarita, California. As a Senior in 2007, she compiled a perfect record of 32-0, setting the record for "the best record in state history." During the 2007 season, she threw 24 shutouts and four no-hitters and allowed only six earned runs in 216 innings pitched for a 0.19 ERA. She also struck out 406 batters for an average of 13.2 strikeouts per seven innings. During her high school career at Valencia, Taylor had a record of 77-8 with an 0.27 ERA and 1,055 strikeouts in 579.1 innings. She was selected as the 2007 National High School Coaches Player of The Year while playing for Valencia. Also as a Senior, Taylor set the California state record for most wins in a week with 10.

== Michigan ==
Taylor enrolled at the University of Michigan in the fall of 2007 and was selected as a 2008 National Fastpitch Coaches Association Second Team All-American, Big Ten First Team and Big Ten Freshman of the Year. On February 8, she made her debut vs. Maryland Terrapins in the Kick-off Classic; she surrendered no earned runs in a 2-0 loss. She went on to toss a no-hitter (on March 15 against the Miami RedHawks) and rank top-10 in school season records for wins, ERA, WHIP and shutouts, all career bests. The wins is a top-10 conference season record and ranked top-10 in the NCAA, along with the ERA.

Beginning in a March 20 loss to the Fresno State Bulldogs, Taylor began a career best 49.1 consecutive scoreless innings streak broken by the Wisconsin Badgers on April 11. She was 7-1 over 10 games (8 complete), striking out 74 and allowing 23 hits and three walks. The first win of the streak on March 21 also began a 15 consecutive game win streak for the Freshman, ending on May 8.

For her Sophomore year, Taylor threw two no-hitters and on May 3 tied a school record when she struck out 16 in regulation vs. the Iowa Hawkeyes. The Wolverines entered the Women's College World Series and won a first round contest against the Alabama Crimson Tide. Taylor threw four shutout innings vs. the No. 1 seeded Florida Gators on May 29 before they eventually lost and were eliminated by the Georgia Bulldogs.

As a Junior in 2010, she repeated NFCA Second Team honors and was named the Pitcher of the Year after compiling a 26-4 record with a 1.44 ERA, including top-10 strikeouts and career best strikeout ratio of 11.1 season records. These would help lead to a Big Ten pitching Triple Crown. She also tossed three no-hitters, including two perfect games. The first came on April 10 vs. the Minnesota Gophers. Back on February 14, she racked up 18 strikeouts in defeating the UCLA Bruins in 13-innings, a career high.

For a final season, Taylor earned Second Team All-American status and conference First Team honors. She posted two no-hitters and top-10 school records in wins, strikeouts, innings (career highs) and shutouts. She ranks top-10 for the wins and strikeouts in the Big Ten season records as well as top-10 in that NCAA year for ERA and shutouts.

In a loss to the Western Kentucky Lady Toppers on March 13, Taylor struck out her 1000th career batter. On May 5, she nabbed her 100th victory, a run-rule defeat of the Ohio State Buckeyes.

Taylor would graduate tops in Michigan Wolverines career wins, strikeouts, innings pitched and no-hitters (8), ranking top-10 in just about every other category. She holds the conference strikeouts and winning percentage (856%) crowns. Taylor is tied 9th in career saves in the NCAA Division I.

== Career statistics ==
=== Michigan Wolverines ===
YEAR	W	L	GP	GS	CG	SHO	SV	IP	H	R	ER	BB	SO	ERA	WHIP
2008	31	4	43	34	26	15	3	222.1	128	39	24	36	279	0.75	0.74
2009	19	5	38	29	18	7	4	190.1	117	45	38	44	285	1.40	0.84
2010	26	4	34	29	24	8	2	199.2	114	55	41	42	316	1.44	0.78
2011	31	5	47	32	30	12	8	241.1	157	62	52	45	340	1.51	0.84
TOTALS	107	18	162	124	98	42	17	853.2	516	201	155	167	1220	1.27	0.80

NPF USSSA Pride & Aussie Spirit
YEAR	W	L	G	GS	CG	Sh	SV	IP	H	R	ER	BB	SO	ERA	WHIP
2011	3	0	5	3	3	2	1	25.0	17	3	3	5	30	0.84	0.88
2013	4	1	13	7	1	0	0	44.0	38	19	14	22	57	2.22	1.36
2014	3	4	19	3	0	0	3	34.0	33	19	11	13	46	2.26	1.35
2015	2	1	19	0	0	0	13	31.2	16	7	6	5	40	1.34	0.67
2016	3	0	25	1	0	0	10	42.2	12	5	4	9	57	0.66	0.50
2017	2	2	20	0	0	0	13	23.2	17	6	3	6	35	0.90	0.99
2018	1	5	13	7	1	1	2	44.0	36	20	17	19	61	2.70	1.25
TOTAL	18	14	115	22	6	4	42	245.0	177	88	65	80	326	1.85	1.05

== Links ==
- NCAA Division I softball career strikeouts list
- NCAA Division I softball career wins list
