= Beijing Eagles =

Women's professional softball team

- Logo

Information
- League: National Pro Fastpitch
- Location: Daytona Beach, Florida
- Ballpark: Jackie Robinson Ballpark
- Founded: May 2, 2017; 8 years ago
- League championships: 0
- Regular season championships: 0
- Ownership: Chinese Softball Association
- Coach: Hunter Veach

The Beijing Eagles, officially the Beijing Shougang Eagles (北京首钢金鹰女垒), were a women's professional softball team. Established in May 2017, the team plays in the National Pro Fastpitch (NPF). In the 2019 NPF Season the team will play all their home games at Jackie Robinson Ballpark. Managed by Chinese Softball Association, the Eagles' roster is mainly populated with players from the China women's national softball team as a means to gain professional experience against the highest levels of fastpitch play, in anticipation of softball's return to the Olympics in 2020.

== History ==
2017

On May 2, 2017, NPF announced the addition of an expansion team, Beijing Shougang Eagles. Its roster is to be populated with members of China women's national softball team and selected American players. For 2017, the home half Beijing's schedule will be played in the home venues of the other NPF teams. Beijing is expected to announce a permanent US home location in the future.

At a press conference in Beijing, the Eagles announced that Teresa Wilson would be their first head coach, with assistants Breanne Lewis and Thomas Hazelhurst. Wilson had previously coached in the NCAA for 24 years and coached in the NPF in 2012 with the Carolina Diamonds.

The Eagles finished their first season with three wins in 47 games, missing the playoffs.

== General managers ==
- (2017–present)

== All-time head coaches ==
#	Name	Term	Regular season				Playoffs			
#	Name	Term	GC	W	L	W%	GC	W	L	W%
1	Teresa Wilson	2017, 2018	93	16	77	.172	0	0	0	undef.

== Season-by-season ==
Season records
Season	W	L	T	Finish	Playoff results
2017	3	44	0	6th place National Pro Fastpitch	Did not qualify
2018	13	33	0	4th place National Pro Fastpitch	Did not qualify
Totals	16	77	0		

=== Current roster ===
Beijing Shougang Eagles roster
Active roster (YYYY = Final season of player contract)		Inactive roster	Coaches
Pitchers: 3 Li Qi (China) (2017); 28 Wang Xin Yu (China) (2017); 34 Gu Nian Nian (China) (2017); 36 Zhang Hui Yao (China) (2017); 66 Nancy Bowling (United States) (2017)	Catchers: 7 Xi Kai Lin (China) (2017); 20 Xu Jun Yi (China) (2017); Infielders: 4 Xu Qian Wen (China) (2017); 5 Liu Li Li (China) (2017); 6 Lu Ying (China) (2017); 10 Yang Hai Qi (China) (2017); 15 Wang Bei (China) (2017); 17 Yuan Ming Han (China) (2017); 21 Xu Jia (China) (2017); 23 Zhao Jing (China) (2017); 25 Feng Qian Wen (China) (2017); 30 Wang Lan (China) (2017); 32 Liu Meng Meng (China) (2017); 37 Zhang Yan (China) (2017); Outfielders: 1 Liu Fei Fei (China) (2017); 9 Cao Yang (China) (2017); 11 Yuan Huai Ning (China) (2017); 12 Sun Xun (China) (2017); 13 Chen Jia (China) (2017); 14 Liu Yi Ning (China) (2017)		Legend: * Franchise Player Tag; (C) Captain; (A) Alternate captain; → All NPF rosters
