= 2016 NPF transactions =

The following is a list 2016 NPF transactions that have occurred in the National Pro Fastpitch softball league since the completion of the 2015 season and during the 2016 season. It lists which team each player has been traded to, signed by, or claimed by, and for which player(s) or draft pick (s), if applicable. Players who have retired are also listed. Per Commissioner Cheri Kempf's tweet, NPF contracts expire in February, therefore the extension of a contract "through 2018" means the player is only contracted to play through the 2017 season, with the contract expiring the following February. "Thru 2018 season" therefore would mean a contract that expires in February 2019, covering only games played in 2018.

For selections in drafts impacting the 2016 season (the Scrap Yard Dawgs expansion draft and the college draft), see 2016 NPF Draft.

As of August 1, 5:00 pm EST, all team rosters were made fixed and constant through the conclusion of the 2016 NPF Championship Series.

== Transactions ==
Source:Any transactions listed below without a reference were originally announced on NPF's transactions page

Date	Player	Team	Type	Details/Ref
08/01/2016	Janelle Lindvall	Scrap Yard Dawgs	Signing	Janelle Lindvall Signs with Dawgs thru 2018 season
08/01/2016	Jade Rhodes	Scrap Yard Dawgs	Signing	Jade Rhodes Signs with Dawgs thru 2017 season
08/01/2016	Taylah Tsistsikronis	Pennsylvania Rebellion	Signing	Taylah Tsistsikronis Re-Signs with Rebellion thru 2017
08/01/2016	Ivy Renfroe	Scrap Yard Dawgs	Retirement	Ivy Renfroe Retires from National Pro Fastpitch
08/01/2016	Jade Rhodes	Pennsylvania Rebellion	Release	Jade Rhodes Released from Rebellion
07/31/2016	Sara Plourde	Scrap Yard Dawgs	Signing	Sara Plourde Re-signs with Dawgs thru 2018 season
07/28/2016	Amanda Chidester	Scrap Yard Dawgs	Retirement	Amanda Chidester Retires from National Pro Fastpitch
07/25/2016	Victoria Hayward	Pennsylvania Rebellion	Signing	Victoria Hayward Signs with Rebellion thru 2016 season
07/25/2016	Raven Chavanne	Pennsylvania Rebellion	Retirement	Raven Chavanne Retires from National Pro Fastpitch
07/25/2016	Amanda Kamekona	Chicago Bandits	Signing	Amanda Kamekona Signs with Bandits thru 2016 season
07/25/2016	Emily Allard	Chicago Bandits	Release	Emily Allard Released from Bandits
07/20/2016	Aubree Munro	USSSA Florida Pride	Signing	Aubree Munro Signs with Pride thru 2017 season
07/20/2016	Amanda Kamekona	USSSA Florida Pride	Release	Amanda Kamekona Released from USSSA Pride
07/19/2016	Melissa Taukeiho	USSSA Florida Pride	Release	Melissa Taukeiho Released from Pride
07/08/2016	Magali Frezzotti	Akron Racers	Release	Magali Frezzotti Released from Racers
07/07/2016	Haylie McCleney	USSSA Florida Pride	Signing	Haylie McCleney Signs with Pride thru 2018 season
07/02/2016	Madison Osias	Pennsylvania Rebellion	Signing	Madison Osias Signs with Rebellion thru 2017 season
07/01/2016	Angel Bunner	Chicago Bandits	Signing	Angel Bunner Signs with Bandits thru 2016 season
07/01/2016	Nikki Sagermann	USSSA Florida Pride	Release	Nikki Sagermann Released from Pride
06/30/2016	Taylah Tsitsikronis	Pennsylvania Rebellion	Retirement	Taylah Tsitsikronis Retires from National Pro Fastpitch
06/29/2016	Hayley Flynn	Pennsylvania Rebellion	Extension	Hayley Flynn Signs with Rebellion thru 2017 season
06/28/2016	Victoria Hayward	Pennsylvania Rebellion	Retirement	Victoria Hayward Retires from National Pro Fastpitch
06/24/2016	Rachele Fico	Akron Racers	Signing	Rachele Fico Extends Contract with Racers thru 2017 season
06/21/2016	Mikela Manewa	Scrap Yard Dawgs	Signing	Mikela Manewa Signs with Dawgs thru 2018 season
06/21/2016	Sara Nevins	Scrap Yard Dawgs	Retirement	Sara Nevins Retires from National Pro Fastpitch
06/15/2016	Emily Carosone	Chicago Bandits	Signing	Emily Carosone Signs with Bandits thru 2016 season
06/14/2016	Jade Rhodes	Pennsylvania Rebellion	Signing	Jade Rhodes Signs with Rebellion thru 2017 season
06/11/2016	Sandra Simmons	Akron Racers	Signing	Sandra Simmons Signs with Racers thru 2017 season
06/10/2016	Emily Crane	Scrap Yard Dawgs	Signing	Emily Crane Signs with Dawgs thru 2017 season
06/10/2016	Sara Driesenga	Scrap Yard Dawgs	Signing	Sara Driesenga Signs with Dawgs thru 2017 season
06/10/2016	Geri Ann Glasco	Akron Racers	Signing	Geri Ann Glasco Signs with Racers thru 2017 season
06/10/2016	Sierra Romero	USSSA Florida Pride	Signing	Sierra Romero Signs with Pride thru 2018 season
06/09/2016	Kellsi Kloss	Chicago Bandits	Signing	Kellsi Kloss Signs with Bandits thru 2016 season
06/09/2016	Sara Plourde	Scrap Yard Dawgs	Release	Sara Plourde Released from Dawgs
06/09/2016	Bridgette Del Ponte	Scrap Yard Dawgs	Retirement	Bridgette Del Ponte Retires from National Pro Fastpitch
06/08/2016	Alex Hugo	Akron Racers	Signing	Alex Hugo Signs with Racers thru 2017 season
06/08/2016	Magali Frezzotti	Akron Racers	Signing	Magali Frezzotti Signs with Racers thru 2016 season
06/07/2016	Erica Field	USSSA Florida Pride	Signing	Erica Field Signs with Pride thru 2017 season
06/07/2016	Cheridan Hawkins	Dallas Charge	Signing	Cheridan Hawkins Signs with Charge thru 2018 season
06/06/2016	Kirsti Merritt	USSSA Florida Pride	Signing	Kirsti Merritt Signs with Pride thru 2017 season
06/06/2016	Taylor Gadbois	Dallas Charge	Signing	Taylor Gadbois Signs with Charge thru 2018 season
06/06/2016	Sami Fagan	Akron Racers	Signing	Sami Fagan Signs with Racers thru 2017 season
06/06/2016	Jailyn Ford	Akron Racers	Signing	Jailyn Ford Signs with Racers thru 2017 season
06/03/2016	Lexie Elkins	Pennsylvania Rebellion	Signing	Lexie Elkins Signs with Rebellion thru 2017 season
06/01/2016	Kiki Stokes	Scrap Yard Dawgs	Signing	Kiki Stokes Signs with Dawgs thru 2018 season
06/01/2016	Christian Stokes	Scrap Yard Dawgs	Signing	Christian Stokes Signs with Dawgs thru 2018 season
06/01/2016	Lee Ann Spivey	Scrap Yard Dawgs	Signing	Lee Ann Spivey Signs with Dawgs thru 2018 season
06/01/2016	Sara Plourde	Scrap Yard Dawgs	Signing	Sara Plourde Signs with Dawgs thru 2018 season
06/01/2016	Lexi Overstreet	Scrap Yard Dawgs	Signing	Lexi Overstreet Signs with Scrap Yard Dawgs thru 2018 season
06/01/2016	Taylore Fuller	Scrap Yard Dawgs	Signing	Taylore Fuller Signs with Dawgs thru 2018 season
05/31/2016	Lindsey Stephens	Pennsylvania Rebellion	Signing	Lindsey Stephens Signs with Rebellion
05/30/2016	Kelsey Stewart	USSSA Florida Pride	Signing	Kelsey Stewart Signs with Pride thru 2018 season
05/29/2016	Kelsey Dotson	Chicago Bandits	Signing	Kelsey Dotson Signs with Bandits thru June 9, 2016
05/29/2016	Samantha McClosky	Chicago Bandits	Signing	Samantha McClosky Signs with Bandits thru June 9, 2016
05/29/2016	Allie Bauch	Chicago Bandits	Signing	Allie Bauch Signs with Bandits thru 2016 season
05/29/2016	Alaynie Page	Chicago Bandits	Signing	Alaynie Page Signs with Bandits thru 2016 season
05/28/2016	Sarah Prezioso	Pennsylvania Rebellion	Retirement	Sarah Prezioso Retires from National Pro Fastpitch
05/28/2016	Melissa Taukeiaho	USSSA Florida Pride	Signing	Melissa Taukeiaho Signs with Pride thru 2017 season
05/28/2016	Kayla Winkfield	Pennsylvania Rebellion	Signing	Kayla Winkfield Signs with Rebellion thru 2017 season
05/28/2016	Brittany Gomez	Pennsylvania Rebellion	Signing	Brittany Gomez Signs with Rebellion thru 2017 season
05/28/2016	Chaley Brickey	Pennsylvania Rebellion	Signing	Chaley Brickey Signs with Rebellion thru 2017 season
05/28/2016	Jill Compton	Dallas Charge	Signing	Jill Compton Signs with Charge thru 2018 season
05/27/2016	Sarah Purvis	Dallas Charge	Release	Sarah Purvis Released from Charge
05/27/2016	Nikki Sagermann	USSSA Florida Pride	Signing	Nikki Sagermann Signs with Pride thru 2017 season
05/26/2016	Shelby Turnier	Chicago Bandits	Signing	Shelby Turnier Signs with Bandits thru 2016 season
05/26/2016	Andi Williamson	Dallas Charge	Signing	Andi Williamson Signs with Dallas Charge thru 2018 season
05/26/2016	Andrea Filler	Chicago Bandits	Signing	Andrea Filler Signs with Bandits thru 2016 season
05/25/2016	Kristen Brown	Chicago Bandits	Signing	Kristen Brown Signs with Bandits thru 2016 season
05/24/2016	Emily Messer	Akron Racers	Signing	Emily Messer Signs with Racers thru 2016 season
05/24/2016	Katie Cotta	Dallas Charge	Release	Katie Cotta Released from Charge
05/23/2016	Kelsey Nunley	USSSA Florida Pride	Signing	Kelsey Nunley Signs with Pride thru 2017 season
05/17/2016	Caitlin Attfield	Dallas Charge	Signing	Caitlin Attfield Signs with Charge thru 2018 season
05/17/2016	Andi Williamson	USSSA Florida Pride	Release	Andi Williamson released from Pride
05/17/2016	Hannah Day	Akron Racers	Signing	Hannah Day Signs with Racers thru 2016 season
05/16/2016	Hannah Perryman	Akron Racers	Signing	Hannah Perryman Signs with Racers thru 2016 season
05/10/2016	Jolene Henderson	USSSA Florida Pride	Signing	Jolene Henderson Signs with Pride thru 2018 season
05/10/2016	Morgan Foley	Chicago Bandits	Signing	Morgan Foley Signs with Bandits thru 2016 season
05/06/2016	Lauren Sweet	USSSA Florida Pride	Signing	Lauren Sweet Signs with Pride thru 2017 season
05/06/2016	Brittany Schutte	Dallas Charge	Signing	Brittany Schutte Signs with Charge thru 2018 season
05/05/2016	Monica Abbott	Scrap Yard Dawgs	Signing	Monica Abbott Signs with Dawgs thru 2021 season
05/02/2016	Samie Garcia	Scrap Yard Dawgs	Release	Samie Garcia released from Dawgs
05/01/2016	Jolene Henderson	Dallas Charge	Free agency	Jolene Henderson becomes free agent
05/01/2016	Monica Abbott	Chicago Bandits	Free agency	Monica Abbott becomes free agent
05/01/2016	Tammy Williams	Chicago Bandits	Free agency	Tammy Williams becomes free agent
05/01/2016	Haley Outon	Akron Racers	Free agency	Haley Outon becomes free agent
05/01/2016	Rachele Fico	Akron Racers	Free agency	Rachele Fico becomes free agent
05/01/2016	Franchise Player Tag Expires for All Teams			
04/28/2016	Lexy Bennett	Scrap Yard Dawgs	Retirement	Lexy Bennett Retires from National Pro Fastpitch
04/21/2016	Ivy Renfroe	Scrap Yard Dawgs	Signing	Ivy Renfroe Signs with Dawgs thru 2018 season
04/21/2016	Ellen Renfroe Reed	Scrap Yard Dawgs	Signing	Ellen Renfroe Reed Signs with Dawgs thru 2018 season
04/19/2016	Nikia Williams	Dallas Charge	Signing	Nikia Williams Signs with the Charge thru 2018 season
04/12/2016	Katie Cotta	Dallas Charge	Trade	Dawgs trade Katie Cotta to Charge in exchange for Dawgs' 2018 6th Round Draft Pick
04/08/2016	Amanda Fama	Scrap Yard Dawgs	Signing	Amanda Fama Signs with Dawgs thru 2018 season
04/07/2016	Brigette Del Ponte	Scrap Yard Dawgs	Trade	Pride trade Madison Shipman and Brigette Del Ponte to Dawgs in exchange for the 2016 13th Overall Draft Pick and the 2017 2nd and 3rd Round Draft Pick
04/07/2016	Madison Shipman	Scrap Yard Dawgs	Trade	Pride trade Madison Shipman and Brigette Del Ponte to Dawgs in exchange for the 2016 13th Overall Draft Pick and the 2017 2nd and 3rd Round Draft Pick
04/07/2016	Sara Nevins	Scrap Yard Dawgs	Extension	Sara Nevins Extends contract with Dawgs thru 2018 season
03/23/2016	Megan Low	Scrap Yard Dawgs	Retirement	Megan Low Retires from National Pro Fastpitch
03/14/2016	Amber Freeman	Scrap Yard Dawgs	Retirement	Amber Freeman Retires from National Pro Fastpitch
03/03/2016	Raven Chavanne	Pennsylvania Rebellion	Signing	Raven Chavanne Signs with Rebellion thru 2016 season
02/19/2016	Maddie O'Brien	Pennsylvania Rebellion	Retirement	Maddie O'Brien Retires from National Pro Fastpitch
02/17/2016	Vicky Galasso	Dallas Charge	Signing	Vicky Galasso Signs with Charge thru 2017
02/16/2016	Sam Fisher	Akron Racers	Signing	Sam Fisher Signs with Racers thru 2017
02/16/2016	Jessica Garcia	USSSA Florida Pride	Extension	Jessica Garcia Extends Contract with Pride thru 2017
02/15/2016	Jessica Garcia	USSSA Florida Pride	Free Agency	Jessica Garcia Becomes Free Agent
02/15/2016	Lara Andrews	Pennsylvania Rebellion	Free Agency	Lara Andrews Becomes Free Agent
02/15/2016	Haruna Sakamoto	Pennsylvania Rebellion	Free Agency	Haruna Sakamoto Becomes Free Agent
02/15/2016	Molly Fichtner	Dallas Charge	Free Agency	Molly Fichtner Becomes Free Agent
02/15/2016	Nicole Morgan	Dallas Charge	Free Agency	Nicole Morgan Becomes Free Agent
02/15/2016	Angeline Quiocho	Dallas Charge	Free Agency	Angeline Quiocho Becomes Free Agent
02/15/2016	Taylor Thom	Dallas Charge	Free Agency	Taylor Thom Becomes Free Agent
02/15/2016	Victoria Valos	Dallas Charge	Free Agency	Victoria Valos Becomes Free Agent
02/15/2016	Kazuki Watanabe	Dallas Charge	Free Agency	Kazuki Watanabe Becomes Free Agent
02/15/2016	Eri Yamada	Dallas Charge	Free Agency	Eri Yamada Becomes Free Agent
02/15/2016	RT Cantillo	Chicago Bandits	Free Agency	RT Cantillo Becomes Free Agent
02/15/2016	Vicky Galasso	Chicago Bandits	Free Agency	Vicky Galasso Becomes Free Agent
02/15/2016	Kirsten Verdun	Chicago Bandits	Free Agency	Kirsten Verdun Becomes Free Agent
02/15/2016	Hannah Campbell	Akron Racers	Free Agency	Hannah Campbell Becomes Free Agent
02/15/2016	Briana Hamilton	Akron Racers	Free Agency	Briana Hamilton Becomes Free Agent
02/15/2016	Ayumi Karino	Akron Racers	Free Agency	Ayumi Karino Becomes Free Agent
02/15/2016	Sonoka Kuniyoshi	Akron Racers	Free Agency	Sonoka Kuniyoshi Becomes Free Agent
02/15/2016	Lisa Norris	Akron Racers	Free Agency	Lisa Norris Becomes Free Agent
02/12/2016	Natasha Watley	USSSA Florida Pride	Retirement	Natasha Watley Retires from National Pro Fastpitch
02/11/2016	Morgan Melloh	Dallas Charge	Extension	Morgan Melloh Extends Contract with Charge thru 2017
02/11/2016	Nerissa Myers	Scrap Yard Dawgs	Extension	Nerissa Myers Extends Contract with Dawgs thru 2017
02/11/2016	Megan Willis	USSSA Florida Pride	Retirement	Megan Willis Retires from National Pro Fastpitch
02/10/2016	Monica Abbott	Chicago Bandits	Franchise Player Tag	Bandits place Franchise Player Tag on Monica Abbott
02/10/2016	Rachele Fico	Akron Racers	Franchise Player Tag	Racers place Franchise Player Tag on Rachele Fico
02/10/2016	Haley Outon	Akron Racers	Franchise Player Tag	Racers place Franchise Player Tag on Haley Outon
02/10/2016	Jessica Garcia	USSSA Florida Pride	Trade	Pride trade their 2017 NPF College Draft - 5th Round Pick to the Racers in exchange for Jessica Garcia
02/09/2016	Taylah Tsistsikronis	Pennsylvania Rebellion	Extension	Taylah Tsistsikronis Signs with Rebellion thru 2017
02/08/2016	Virginie Anneveld	Pennsylvania Rebellion	Release	Virginie Anneveld Released from Rebellion
02/06/2016	Courtney Senas	Pennsylvania Rebellion	Extension	Courtney Senas Extends Contract with Rebellion thru 2017
02/06/2016	Sarah Prezioso	Pennsylvania Rebellion	Extension	Sarah Prezioso Extends Contract with Rebellion thru 2017
02/06/2016	Emma Johnson	Pennsylvania Rebellion	Extension	Emma Johnson Extends Contract with Rebellion thru 2017
02/06/2016	Alisa Goler	Pennsylvania Rebellion	Extension	Alisa Goler Extends Contract with Rebellion thru 2017
02/06/2016			Trade	Chicago Bandits trade their 2016 NPF College Draft - 6th Round Pick to the Dallas Charge in exchange for the Dallas Charge 6th Round Pick in the 2017 NPF College Draft
02/04/2016	Brittney Lindley	Pennsylvania Rebellion	Retirement	Brittney Lindley Retires from National Pro Fastpitch
02/04/2016	Allyson Fournier	Pennsylvania Rebellion	Retirement	Allyson Fournier Retires from National Pro Fastpitch
02/04/2016	Dagmar Bloeming	Pennsylvania Rebellion	Retirement	Dagmar Bloeming Retires from National Pro Fastpitch
02/03/2016	Kelsi Jones	Chicago Bandits	Retirement	Kelsi Jones Retires from National Pro Fastpitch
02/02/2016	Britt Vonk	Scrap Yard Dawgs	Signing	Britt Vonk Signs with Dawgs thru 2017
02/02/2016	Cassie Tysarczyk	Akron Racers	Extension	Cassie Tysarczyk Extends Contract with Racers thru 2016 season
01/29/2016	Tammy Williams	Chicago Bandits	Franchise Player Tag	Bandits place Franchise Player Tag on Tammy Williams
01/26/2016	Meagan May-Whitley	Scrap Yard Dawgs	Signing	Meagan May-Whitley Signs with Dawgs thru 2017
01/21/2016	Alison Owen	Akron Racers	Extension	Alison Owen Extends Contract with Racers thru 2016 season
01/20/2016	Courtney Ceo	USSSA Florida Pride	Extension	Courtney Ceo Extends Contract with Pride thru 2017
01/18/2016	Christine Orgeron	Scrap Yard Dawgs	Signing	Christine Orgeron Signs with Dawgs thru 2017
01/18/2016	Aimee Creger	Akron Racers	Extension	Aimee Creger Extends Contract with Racers thru 2017
01/17/2016	Nerissa Myers	Scrap Yard Dawgs	Trade	Racers trade Nerissa Myers to Dawgs for the 1st Selection in 4th Round of 2016 Draft and 1st Selection in 5th Round of 2017 Draft.
01/15/2016	Jackie Traina	Scrap Yard Dawgs	Signing	Jackie Traina Signs with Dawgs thru 2016 season
01/15/2016	Sara Nevins	Scrap Yard Dawgs	Signing	Sara Nevins Signs with Dawgs thru 2016 season
01/15/2016	Amanda Chidester	Scrap Yard Dawgs	Signing	Amanda Chidester Signs with Dawgs thru 2016 season
01/14/2016	Danielle Zymkowitz	Chicago Bandits	Extension	Danielle Zymkowitz Extends Contract with Bandits thru 2016 season
01/14/2016	Laura Winter	Akron Racers	Extension	Laura Winter Extends Contract with Racers thru 2016 season
01/12/2016	Renee Erwin	Scrap Yard Dawgs	Signing	Renee Erwin Signs (2) Year Deal with Dawgs thru 2017 season
01/04/2016	Katie Cotta	Scrap Yard Dawgs	Signing	Katie Cotta Signs (2) Year Deal with Dawgs thru 2017 season
01/04/2016	Lexy Bennett	Scrap Yard Dawgs	Signing	Lexy Bennett Signs (2) Year Deal with Dawgs thru 2017 season
12/30/2015	Natalie Hernandez	Chicago Bandits	Extension	Natalie Hernandez Extends Contract with Bandits thru 2016 season
12/30/2015	Rachel Fox	Scrap Yard Dawgs	Signing	Rachel Fox Signs (2) Year Deal with Dawgs thru 2017 season
12/22/2015	Michelle Gascoigne	Chicago Bandits	Extension	Michelle Gascoigne Extends Contract with Bandits thru 2016 season
12/21/2015	Megan Low	Scrap Yard Dawgs	Signing	Megan Low Signs (2) Year Deal with Dawgs thru 2017 season - 1st player to sign in franchise history
12/21/2015	AJ Andrews	Akron Racers	Signing	AJ Andrews signs (2) Year Deal with Racers thru 2017 Season
12/16/2015	Megan Blank	Chicago Bandits	Extension	Megan Blank extends Contract with Bandits thru 2016 season
12/14/2015	Madison Shipman	USSSA Florida Pride	Extension	Madison Shipman Extends Contract with Pride thru 2017 season
12/09/2015	Emily Allard	Chicago Bandits	Extension	Emily Allard Extends Contract with Bandits thru 2016 season
12/09/2015	Sammy Marshall	Chicago Bandits	Extension	Sammy Marshall Extends Contract with Bandits thru 2016 season
12/08/2015	Brigette Del Ponte	USSSA Florida Pride	Extension	Brigette Del Ponte Extends Contract with Pride thru 2016 season
12/08/2015	Amanda Kamekona	USSSA Florida Pride	Extension	Amanda Kamekona Extends Contract with Pride thru 2016 season
12/08/2015	Danielle Henderson	Dallas Charge	Extension	Danielle Henderson Extends Contract with Charge thru 2017 season
12/02/2015	Tatum Edwards	Chicago Bandits	Extension	Tatum Edwards Extends Contract with Bandits thru 2016 season
11/25/2015	Brianna Cherry	Dallas Charge	Extension	Brianna Cherry Extends Contract with Charge thru 2017 season
11/25/2015	Jill Barrett	Chicago Bandits	Signing	Jill Barrett Signs with Bandits thru 2016 season
11/23/2015	Sarah Purvis	Dallas Charge	Extension	Sarah Purvis Extends Contract with Charge thru 2017 season
11/18/2015	AJ Andrews	Akron Racers	Trade	Jill Barrett traded from Racers to Bandits for AJ Andrews and the #4 and #31 overall pick in the 2016 NPF College Draft
11/18/2015	Jill Barrett	Chicago Bandits	Trade	Jill Barrett traded from Racers to Bandits for AJ Andrews and the #4 and #31 overall pick in the 2016 NPF College Draft
11/18/2015	Taylor Edwards	Chicago Bandits	Extension	Taylor Edwards Extends Contract with Bandits thru 2016 season
11/16/2015	Sara Moulton	Chicago Bandits	Extension	Sara Moulton Extends Contract with Bandits thru 2016 season
11/16/2015	Lacey Waldrop	Chicago Bandits	Extension	Lacey Waldrop Extends Contract with Bandits thru 2016 season
11/11/2015	Kaylyn Castillo	Dallas Charge	Extension	Kaylyn Castillo Extends Contract with Charge thru 2017 season
11/05/2015	Ashley Thomas	Akron Racers	Extension	Ashley Thomas Extends Contract with Racers thru 2018
11/04/2015	Samie Garcia	Pennsylvania Rebellion	Signing	Samie Garcia Re-Signs with Rebellion thru 2017 Season
11/02/2015	Chelsea Forkin	Dallas Charge	Signing	Chelsea Forkin (Australia) signs with Charge - 2-year deal
10/30/2015	Brenna Moss	Chicago Bandits	Extension	Brenna Moss Extends Contract with Bandits thru 2017
10/29/2015	Vanessa Stokes	Dallas Charge	Extension	Vanessa Stokes Extends Contract with Charge thru 2018
10/26/2015	Taylor Schlopy	Akron Racers	Extension	Taylor Schlopy Extends Contract with Racers thru 2018
10/26/2015	Shellie Robinson	Akron Racers	Extension	Shellie Robinson Extends Contract with Racers thru 2018
10/26/2015	Sarah Pauly	Akron Racers	Extension	Sarah Pauly Extends Contract with Racers thru 2018
10/26/2015	Jennifer Gilbert	Akron Racers	Extension	Jennifer Gilbert Extends Contract with Racers thru 2018
10/26/2015	Kelley Montalvo	Akron Racers	Extension	Kelley Montalvo Extends Contract with Racers thru 2018
10/26/2015	Griffin Joiner	Akron Racers	Extension	Griffin Joiner Extends Contract with Racers thru 2018
10/24/2015	Emily Weiman	Pennsylvania Rebellion	Extension	Emily Weiman Extends Contract with Rebellion thru 2018
10/24/2015	Haylie Wagner	Pennsylvania Rebellion	Extension	Haylie Wagner Extends Contract with Rebellion thru 2018
10/24/2015	Stacey Porter	Pennsylvania Rebellion	Signing	Stacey Porter (Univ. of Hawaii/Australia) signs with Rebellion
10/24/2015	Maddie O'Brien	Pennsylvania Rebellion	Extension	Maddie O'Brien Extends Contract with Rebellion thru 2018
10/24/2015	Allyson Fournier	Pennsylvania Rebellion	Extension	Allyson Fournier Extends Contract with Rebellion thru 2018
10/24/2015	Dallas Escobedo	Pennsylvania Rebellion	Extension	Dallas Escobedo Extends Contract with Rebellion thru 2018
10/24/2015	Cheyenne Cordes	Pennsylvania Rebellion	Extension	Cheyenne Cordes Extends Contract with Rebellion thru 2018
10/24/2015	Whitney Arion	Pennsylvania Rebellion	Extension	Whitney Arion Extends Contract with Rebellion thru 2018
10/24/2015	Mikey Kenney	Dallas Charge	Extension	Mikey Kenney Extends Contract with Charge thru 2017
8/19/2015	Cat Osterman	USSSA Florida Pride	Retirement	Cat Osterman Announces Retirement
