= 2016 National Pro Fastpitch season =

2016 NPF Season
- League: National Pro Fastpitch
- Sport: softball
- Duration: May 31, 2016 – August 14, 2016
- Teams: 6
- TV partner: CBS Sports Network

2016 NPF Draft
- Top draft pick: Lexie Elkins C Louisiana–Lafayette
- Picked by: Pennsylvania Rebellion

Regular Season
- NPF Cup (Best record): USSSA Florida Pride
- Runners-up: Scrap Yard Dawgs
- Player of the Year: Kelly Kretschman
- Pitcher of the Year: Monica Abbott
- Gold Glove Award: AJ Andrews

Cowles Cup
- Champions: Chicago Bandits
- Runners-up: USSSA Pride
- Finals MVP: Brittany Cervantes Chicago Bandits

NPF seasons
- 2015 2017

The 2016 National Pro Fastpitch season was the 13th season of professional softball under the name National Pro Fastpitch (NPF) for the only professional women's softball league in the United States. From 1997 to 2002, NPF operated under the names Women's Pro Fastpitch (WPF) and Women's Pro Softball League (WPSL). Each year, the playoff teams battle for the Cowles Cup.

== Milestones and events ==
The Akron Racers celebrated their 15th season in 2016, the most of any NPF team. They have played in all 13 of the NPF's seasons, as well at the WPSL's last two seasons (1999 and 2000).

On October 23, 2015, the NPF announced that the Scrap Yard Dawgs would join the league as an expansion team.

On April 11, NPF announced a renewal of their television agreement with CBS Sports Network for 2016. Broadcasts will include the 2016 NPF College Draft, 23 regular-season games, a Championship Series Preview Special, and most of the Championship Series.

On June 10, the Pride's Chelsea Thomas and Kelsey Nunley pitched a combined no-hitter against the Dawgs at the Scrap Yard's first-ever home game.

On August 11, Lauren Haeger pitched a no-hitter, beating the Chicago Bandits 5–0. The only Bandit to reach base did so via a Charge fielding error.

Rawlings announced it would begin awarding a fastpitch softball gold glove to an NPF player, selected by a vote of league coaches and managers. The Racers' AJ Andrews was selected for this award.

Kelly Kretschman became the first NPF player to win the triple crown when she ended the season leading in batting average, home runs, and RBI.

=== Rule changes ===
On June 12, in response to online threats made against players, NPF cancelled the mandatory 45-minute autograph session after each game. The following Tuesday, the league reinstated the sessions, but limited the attendees to children.

== Teams, cities and stadiums ==
Team	City	Stadium	Coaches
Akron Racers	Akron, Ohio	Firestone Stadium	Head Coach: Brian Levin; Assistant: Dustin Combs
Chicago Bandits	Rosemont, Illinois (Chicago Area)	Ballpark at Rosemont	Head Coach:Mike Steuerwald; Assistant: Roman Foore
Dallas Charge	Dallas–Fort Worth, Texas	The Ballfields at Craig Ranch (McKinney, TX)	Head Coach: Jennifer Rocha; Assistants: Rich Wieligman, Kristen Zaleski
Pennsylvania Rebellion	Washington, Pennsylvania	Consol Energy Park	Head Coach: Craig Montvidas; Assistant: Tracy Bunge, Jim Walker, Madison Rotto
Scrap Yard Dawgs	Woodlands, TX (Houston Area)	Scrap Yard Sports Complex	Head Coaches: Javier Vela, Tripp MacKay; Assistants: Rachel Lawson, Kara Dill
USSSA Florida Pride	Kissimmee, Florida	Champion Stadium	Head Coach: Lonni Alameda; Assistants: Jeff Ellsworth, Samantha Ricketts, Megan Willis

National Pro Fastpitch teams

== Player acquisition ==
=== College draft ===
The 2016 NPF College Draft is the 13th annual collegiate draft for NPF, and was held on Thursday, April 14, 2016, 7:00 pm CST at the CMA Theater in the Country Music Hall of Fame and Museum in Nashville, Tennessee.

With the first overall pick, the Pennsylvania Rebellion selected Louisiana-Lafayette catcher Lexie Elkins, who led the NCAA during the 2015–16 season in batting average, slugging percentage and home runs and was also tied for 13th in Division I history with 72 career home runs.

=== Notable transactions ===
- Head Coaching Changes
  - Dallas Charge hired University of Florida assistant coach Jennifer Rocha to be their new head coach,
  - Florida State head coach Lonni Alameda took over as head coach of the USSSA Pride.
- On October 27, 2015, Stacey Porter, called "the world’s best batter,” signed a contract with the Pennsylvania Rebellion.
- On May 5, the Scrap Yard Dawgs signed free agent Monica Abbott to a six-year contract, believed to be worth $1 million. No woman had previously signed a million-dollar contract in American professional team sports.

== League standings ==
Through 2016 Season

x-Clinched Playoff Berth y-Clinched Best Overall Record

Team	GP	W	L	Pct.	GB
y-USSSA Pride	50	37	13	.740	-
x-Scrap Yard Dawgs	48	29	19	.604	7
x-Chicago Bandits	48	23	25	.479	13
x-Akron Racers	50	22	28	.440	15
Dallas Charge	50	20	30	.400	17
Pennsylvania Rebellion	50	17	33	.340	20

Final two games between Scrap Yard Dawgs and Chicago cancelled as there was no playoff implications

=== Results table ===
2016 NPF Records
Team	Racers	Bandits	Charge	Rebellion	Dawgs	Pride
Akron Racers	—	4–7	6–4	9–1	3–6	0–10
Chicago Bandits	7–4	—	3–7	4–5	5–3	4–6
Dallas Charge	4–6	7–3	—	4–5	3–7	2–8
Pennsylvania Rebellion	1–9	5–4	5–4	—	2–9	3–7
Scrap Yard Dawgs	6–3	3–5	7–3	8–2	—	4–6
USSSA Florida Pride	10–0	6–4	9–2	7–3	6–4	—

Legend
	Protest/Halted Game
	Postponement
**Bold**	Winning team

=== 2016 Game log ===
May/June

Date	Time	Visitor	Home	Venue	Score	Win	Loss	Save	Player of the Game	Attendance
May. 31	6:35 PM	**Akron Racers** (1–0)	Pennsylvania Rebellion (0–1)	WellSpan Park – York, Pennsylvania	9–3	Aimee Creger (1–0)	Emily Weiman (0–1)	–	Cassie Tysarczyk	1623
Jun. 01	6:35 PM	Akron Racers (1–1)	**Pennsylvania Rebellion** (1–1)	WellSpan Park – York, Pennsylvania	5–7	Emma Johnson (1–0)	Allison Owen (0–1)	Haylie Wagner S(1)	Kristyn Sandberg, Victoria Hayward	1597
Jun. 02	8:05 PM	Scrap Yard Dawgs (0–1)	**Chicago Bandits** (1–0)	Ballpark at Rosemont – Rosemont, Illinois	4–6	Michelle Gascoigne (1–0)	Sara Plourde (0–1)	–	Danielle Zymkowitz	1044
Jun. 03	7:00 PM	**Dallas Charge** (1–0)	Pennsylvania Rebellion (1–2)	Clipper Magazine Stadium – Lancaster	5–2	Jill Compton (1–0)	Emily Weiman (0–2)	–	Lauren Haeger	
Jun. 03	8:35 PM	Scrap Yard Dawgs (0–2)	**Chicago Bandits** (2–0)	Ballpark at Rosemont – Rosemont, Illinois	2–6	Lacey Waldrop (1–0)	Rachel Fox (0–1)	–	Emily Allard|	1218
Jun. 04	1:00 PM	Dallas Charge (1–1)	**Pennsylvania Rebellion** (2–2)	Clipper Magazine Stadium – Lancaster	1–15	Miranda Kramer (1–0)	Andi Williamson (0–1)	–	Alexa Peterson	1566
Jun. 04	8:35 PM	Scrap Yard Dawgs (0–3)	**Chicago Bandits** (3–0)	Ballpark at Rosemont – Rosemont, Illinois	8–9	Morgan Foley (1–0)	Rachel Fox (0–2)	–	Tatum Edwards	1124
Jun. 05	8:05 PM	**Scrap Yard Dawgs** (1–3)	Pennsylvania Rebellion (2–3)	Consol Energy Park – Washington, Pennsylvania	3–1, 9 innings	Sara Nevins (1–0)	Haylie Wagner (0–1)	–	Amanda Chidester	412
Jun. 06	7:05 PM	Scrap Yard Dawgs	Pennsylvania Rebellion	Consol Energy Park – Washington, Pennsylvania	**Suspended (inclement weather)**(Resumed on:June 7)					
Jun. 07; Doubleheader/ resumed game	5:05 PM	**Scrap Yard Dawgs** (2–3)	Pennsylvania Rebellion (2–4)	Consol Energy Park – Washington, Pennsylvania	5–2	Rachel Fox (1–2)	Dallas Escobedo (0–1)	–	Emilee Koerner	453
Jun. 07; Doubleheader/ resumed game	–	Scrap Yard Dawgs (2–4)	**Pennsylvania Rebellion** (3–4)	Consol Energy Park – Washington, Pennsylvania	1–7	Emma Johnson (2–0)	Sara Nevins (1–1)	–	Emma Johnson	453
Jun. 08	7:05 PM	Pennsylvania Rebellion (3–5)	**Akron Racers** (2–1)	Firestone Stadium – Akron, Ohio	2–10	Jailyn Ford (1–0)	Emily Weiman (0–3)	–		635
Jun. 08	8:05 PM	**Dallas Charge** (2–1)	Chicago Bandits (3–1)	Ballpark at Rosemont – Rosemont, Illinois	4–2	Lauren Haeger (1–0)	Michelle Gascoigne (1–1)	–	Kylee Lahners	614
Jun. 09	12:05 PM	Pennsylvania Rebellion (3–6)	**Akron Racers** (3–1)	Firestone Stadium – Akron, Ohio	3–5	Aimee Creger (2–0)	Miranda Kramer (1–1)	Jailyn Ford S(1)		334
Jun. 09	8:05 PM	Dallas Charge (2–2)	**Chicago Bandits** (4–1)	Ballpark at Rosemont – Rosemont, Illinois	2–10	Lacey Waldrop (2–0)	Andi Williamson (0–2)	–	Emily Allard	128
Jun. 10	7:05 PM	Pennsylvania Rebellion (3–7)	**Akron Racers** (4–1)	Firestone Stadium – Akron, Ohio	6–10	Hannah Perryman (1–0)	Emma Johnson (2–1)	–		681
Jun. 10	8:30 PM	**USSSA Florida Pride** (1–0)	Scrap Yard Dawgs (2–5)	Scrap Yard Sports Complex – Conroe, TX	3–1	Chelsea Thomas (1–0)	Monica Abbott (0–1)	Kelsey Nunley S(1)	Chelsea Thomas, Kelsey Nunley	1682
Jun. 10	8:35 PM	**Dallas Charge** (3–2)	Chicago Bandits (4–2)	Ballpark at Rosemont – Rosemont, Illinois	6–5	Jill Compton (2–0)	Shelby Turnier (0–1)	–	Lauren Haeger	1096
Jun. 11	7:05 PM	Chicago Bandits (4–3)	**Pennsylvania Rebellion** (4–7)	Consol Energy Park – Washington, Pennsylvania	1–8	Miranda Kramer (2–1)	Tatum Edwards (0–1)	–	Alexa Peterson	1263
Jun. 11	7:05 PM	Dallas Charge (3–3)	**Akron Racers** (5–1)	Firestone Stadium – Akron, Ohio	5–12	Jailyn Ford (2–0)	Andi Williamson (0–3)	–		511
Jun. 11	8:00 PM	**USSSA Florida Pride** (2–0)	Scrap Yard Dawgs (2–6)	Scrap Yard Sports Complex – Conroe, TX	8–3	Keilani Ricketts (1–0)	Jaclyn Traina (0–1)	–		872
Jun. 12	3:00 PM	USSSA Florida Pride	Scrap Yard Dawgs	Scrap Yard Sports Complex – Conroe, TX	**Postponed**(Makeup date:June 13)					
Jun. 12	5:05 PM	**Chicago Bandits** (5–3)	Pennsylvania Rebellion (4–8)	Consol Energy Park – Washington, Pennsylvania	8–7	Lacey Waldrop (3–0)	Dallas Escobedo (0–2)	–	Taylor Edwards	512
Jun. 13	7:05 PM	**Dallas Charge** (4–3)	Akron Racers (5–2)	Firestone Stadium – Akron, Ohio	7–6	Lauren Haeger (2–0)	Jailyn Ford (2–1)	–		314
Jun. 13	7:05 PM	Chicago Bandits (5–4)	**Pennsylvania Rebellion** (5–8)	Consol Energy Park – Washington, Pennsylvania	1–2	Emily Weiman (1–3)	Michelle Gascoigne (1–2)	Haylie Wagner S(2)	Alisa Goler	375
Jun. 13; Doubleheader/ makeup game	8:30 PM	**USSSA Florida Pride** (3–0)	Scrap Yard Dawgs (2–7)	Scrap Yard Sports Complex – Conroe, TX	7–2	Jolene Henderson (1–0)	Sara Driesenga (0–1)	–		112
Jun. 13; Doubleheader/ makeup game	–	USSSA Florida Pride (3–1)	**Scrap Yard Dawgs** (3–7)	Scrap Yard Sports Complex – Conroe, TX	1–6	Monica Abbott (1–1)	Kelsey Nunley (0–1)	–	Monica Abbott	591
Jun. 14	7:05 PM	**Chicago Bandits** (6–4)	Akron Racers (5–3)	Firestone Stadium – Akron, Ohio	7–3	Shelby Turnier (1–1)	Aimee Creger (2–1)	Lacey Waldrop S(1)	Natalie Hernandez	567
Jun. 14	8:30 PM	**USSSA Florida Pride** (4–1)	Dallas Charge (4–4)	The Ballfields at Craig Ranch – McKinney, Texas	4–1	Hannah Rogers (1–0)	Jill Compton (2–1)	–		
Jun. 15	7:05 PM	**Chicago Bandits** (7–4)	Akron Racers (5–4)	Firestone Stadium – Akron, Ohio	5–1	Sara Moulton (1–0)	Jailyn Ford (2–2)	Michelle Gascoigne S(1)	Taylor Edwards	529
Jun. 15	8:30 PM	**USSSA Florida Pride** (5–1)	Dallas Charge (4–5)	The Ballfields at Craig Ranch – McKinney, Texas	7–4	Chelsea Thomas (2–0)	Lauren Haeger (2–1)	Kelsey Nunley S(2)		
Jun. 16	2:00 PM	**Scrap Yard Dawgs** (4–7)	Dallas Charge (4–6)	ASA Hall of Fame Stadium – Oklahoma City, Oklahoma	7–2	Monica Abbott (2–1)	Morgan Melloh (0–1)	–		
Jun. 17	8:00 PM	**Pennsylvania Rebellion** (6–8)	USSSA Florida Pride (5–2)	Nusz Park – Starkville, MS	6–2	Miranda Kramer (3–1)	Keilani Ricketts (1–1)	–	Kayla Winkfield	
Jun. 17	8:35 PM	**Akron Racers** (6–4)	Chicago Bandits (7–5)	Ballpark at Rosemont – Rosemont, Illinois	6–5	Sarah Pauly (1–0)	Lacey Waldrop (3–1)	Jailyn Ford S(2)	Kelley Montalvo	995
Jun. 18	2:00 PM	**Scrap Yard Dawgs** (5–7)	Dallas Charge (4–7)	Scrap Yard Sports Complex – Conroe, TX	4–1	Monica Abbott (3–1)	Andi Williamson (0–4)	Ivy Renfroe S(1)		400
Jun. 18	8:00 PM	Pennsylvania Rebellion (6–9)	**USSSA Florida Pride** (6–2)	Jane B. Moore Field – Auburn, AL	0–5	Jolene Henderson (2–0)	Emily Weiman (1–4)	–	Megan Wiggins	698
Jun. 18	8:35 PM	Akron Racers (6–5)	**Chicago Bandits** (8–5)	Ballpark at Rosemont – Rosemont, Illinois	3–10	Michelle Gascoigne (2–2)	Laura Winter (0–1)	–	Emily Carasone	1472
Jun. 19	2:00 PM	Dallas Charge (4–8)	**Scrap Yard Dawgs** (6–7)	Scrap Yard Sports Complex – Conroe, TX	0–5	Rachel Fox (2–2)	Lauren Haeger (2–2)	–		550
Jun. 19	4:05 PM	**Akron Racers** (7–5)	Chicago Bandits (8–6)	Ballpark at Rosemont – Rosemont, Illinois	8–5	Jailyn Ford (3–2)	Morgan Foley (1–1)	Sarah Pauly S(1)	Sami Fagan	844
Jun. 19	5:00 PM	Dallas Charge (4–9)	**Scrap Yard Dawgs** (7–7)	Scrap Yard Sports Complex – Conroe, TX	5–6	Ellen Renfroe Reed (1–0)	Lauren Haeger (2–3)	–		324
Jun. 20	7:05 PM	**USSSA Florida Pride** (7–2)	Pennsylvania Rebellion (6–10)	Consol Energy Park – Washington, Pennsylvania	6–0	Kelsey Nunley (1–1)	Emma Johnson (2–2)	–		475
Jun. 20	8:00 PM	**Akron Racers** (8–5)	Dallas Charge (4–10)	The Ballfields at Craig Ranch – McKinney, Texas	7–0	Sarah Pauly (2–0)	Cheridan Hawkins (0–1)	–		504
Jun. 21	7:05 PM	USSSA Florida Pride (7–3)	**Pennsylvania Rebellion** (7–10)	Consol Energy Park – Washington, Pennsylvania	1–3	Haylie Wagner (1–1)	Hannah Rogers (1–1)	–	Kristyn Sandberg	425
Jun. 21	8:00 PM	**Akron Racers** (9–5)	Dallas Charge (4–11)	The Ballfields at Craig Ranch – McKinney, Texas	10–4	Jailyn Ford (4–2)	Morgan Melloh (0–2)	–		757
Jun. 21	8:30 PM	Chicago Bandits (8–7)	**Scrap Yard Dawgs** (8–7)	Scrap Yard Sports Complex – Conroe, TX	3–7	Monica Abbott (4–1)	Lacey Waldrop (3–2)	–	Emilee Koerner	100
Jun. 22	7:05 PM	**USSSA Florida Pride** (8–3)	Pennsylvania Rebellion (7–11)	Consol Energy Park – Washington, Pennsylvania	3–0	Chelsea Thomas (3–0)	Dallas Escobedo (0–3)	–	Chelsea Thomas	525
Jun. 22	8:30 PM	**Chicago Bandits** (9–7)	Scrap Yard Dawgs (8–8)	Scrap Yard Sports Complex – Conroe, TX	8–4	Shelby Turnier (2–1)	Ivy Renfroe (0–1)		Sammy Marshall	105
Jun. 23	7:05 PM	**USSSA Florida Pride** (9–3)	Pennsylvania Rebellion (7–12)	Coca-Cola Park – Allentown, Pennsylvania	6–3	Hannah Rogers (2–1)	Haylie Wagner (1–2)	Jordan Taylor S(1)	Kelly Kretschman	3144
Jun. 23	8:30 PM	Chicago Bandits (9–8)	**Scrap Yard Dawgs** (9–8)	Scrap Yard Sports Complex – Conroe, TX	0–8	Monica Abbott (5–1)	Sara Moulton (1–1)	–	Emily Crane	115
Jun. 24	7:05 PM	**USSSA Florida Pride** (10–3)	Pennsylvania Rebellion (7–13)	Coca-Cola Park – Allentown, Pennsylvania	4–3, 8 innings	Jolene Henderson (3–0)	Emily Weiman (1–5)	Jordan Taylor S(2)	Hallie Wilson	3720
Jun. 24	8:00 PM	Chicago Bandits (9–9)	**Dallas Charge** (5–11)	St. Mary's Softball Stadium – San Antonio, TX	0–10	Cheridan Hawkins (1–1)	Lacey Waldrop (3–3)	–	Renada Davis	296
Jun. 25	7:05 PM	**USSSA Florida Pride** (11–3)	Akron Racers (9–6)	Firestone Stadium – Akron, Ohio	12–6	Keilani Ricketts (2–1)	Sarah Pauly (2–1)	–		1025
Jun. 25	8:00 PM	Chicago Bandits (9–10)	**Dallas Charge** (6–11)	St. Mary's Softball Stadium – San Antonio, TX	0–9	Lauren Haeger (3–3)	Shelby Turnier (2–2)	–	Lauren Haeger	267
Jun. 26	4:05 PM	**USSSA Florida Pride** (12–3)	Akron Racers (9–7)	Firestone Stadium – Akron, Ohio	4–1	Hannah Rogers (3–1)	Jailyn Ford (4–3)	Jordan Taylor S(3)		776
Jun. 27	6:30 PM	Akron Racers (9–8)	**USSSA Florida Pride** (13–3)	Alumni Field – Ann Arbor, Michigan	4–5	Jolene Henderson (4–0)	Jailyn Ford (4–4)	–		970
Jun. 28	7:05 PM	Pennsylvania Rebellion (7–14)	**Akron Racers** (10–8)	Firestone Stadium – Akron, Ohio	1–5	Sarah Pauly (3–1)	Haylie Wagner (1–3)	–	Sarah Pauly	1088
Jun. 28	8:00 PM	**Scrap Yard Dawgs** (10–8)	Dallas Charge (6–12)	Erie Community Park – Erie, CO	7–0	Monica Abbott (6–1)	Morgan Melloh (0–3)	–	Monica Abbott	510
Jun. 28	8:00 PM	Chicago Bandits (9–11)	**USSSA Florida Pride** (14–3)	Alumni Field – Ann Arbor, Michigan	0–10	Keilani Ricketts (3–1)	Michelle Gascoigne (2–3)	–	Kelly Kretschman	738
Jun. 29	7:05 PM	Pennsylvania Rebellion (7–15)	**Akron Racers** (11–8)	Firestone Stadium – Akron, Ohio	3–5, 8 innings	Jailyn Ford (5–4)	Miranda Kramer (3–2)	–	Taylor Schlopy	544
Jun. 29	8:00 PM	Chicago Bandits (9–12)	**USSSA Florida Pride** (15–3)	Alumni Field – Ann Arbor, Michigan	3–4	Jolene Henderson (5–0)	Sara Moulton(1–2)	Jordan Taylor S(4)	Jolene Henderson	864
Jun. 29	8:00 PM	Scrap Yard Dawgs (10–9)	**Dallas Charge** (7–12)	Christopher Fields – Westminster, CO	0–5	Lauren Haeger (4–3)	Ellen Renfroe Reed (1–1)	–	Lauren Haeger	2543
Jun. 30	8:00 PM	**Scrap Yard Dawgs** (11–9)	Dallas Charge (7–13)	Aurora Sports Park – Aurora, CO	9–1	Monica Abbott (7–1)	Cheridan Hawkins (1–2)	–	Monica Abbott	813

July

Date	Time	Visitor	Home	Venue	Score	Win	Loss	Save	Player of the Game	Attendance
Jul. 01	8:35 PM	**Akron Racers** (12–8)	Chicago Bandits (9–13)	Ballpark at Rosemont – Rosemont, Illinois	10–4	Laura Winter (1–1)	Shelby Turnier (2–3)	–	Jenny Gilbert	1213
Jul. 02	TBA	**Pennsylvania Rebellion** (8–15)	Scrap Yard Dawgs (11–10)	Scrap Yard Sports Complex – Conroe, TX	6–1	Emily Weiman (2–5)	Sara Driesenga (0–2)	Haylie Wagner S(3)	Kayla Winkfield	402
Jul. 02	8:35 PM	Akron Racers (12–9)	**Chicago Bandits** (10–13)	Ballpark at Rosemont – Rosemont, Illinois	3–5	Sara Moulton (2–2)	Rachele Fico (0–1)	Michelle Gascoigne S(2)	Danielle Zymkowitz	1339
Jul. 03	5:00 PM	Pennsylvania Rebellion (8–16)	**Scrap Yard Dawgs** (12–10)	Scrap Yard Sports Complex – Conroe, TX	0–1	Monica Abbott (8–1)	Dallas Escobedo (0–4)	–	Kiki Stokes	153
Jul. 04	7:00 PM	**Pennsylvania Rebellion** (9–16)	Dallas Charge (7–14)	The Ballfields at Craig Ranch – McKinney, Texas	4–2	Haylie Wagner (2–3)	Lauren Haeger (4–4)	Emily Weiman S(1)		1140
Jul. 04	7:00 PM	**Akron Racers** (13–9)	Scrap Yard Dawgs (12–11)	Scrap Yard Sports Complex – Conroe, TX	12–0	Sarah Pauly (4–1)	Ivy Renfroe (0–2)	–	Sarah Pauly	175
Jul. 05	8:05 PM	**USSSA Florida Pride** (16–3)	Chicago Bandits (10–14)	Ballpark at Rosemont – Rosemont, Illinois	13–10, 8 innings	Jordan Taylor (1–0)	Morgan Foley (1–2)	–	GiOnna DiSalvatore	1020
Jul. 05	8:30 PM	**Pennsylvania Rebellion** (10–16)	Dallas Charge (7–15)	The Ballfields at Craig Ranch – McKinney, Texas	13–5	Dallas Escobedo (1–4)	Morgan Melloh (0–4)	–	Alisa Goler	516
Jul. 05	8:30 PM	Akron Racers (13–10)	**Scrap Yard Dawgs** (13–11)	Scrap Yard Sports Complex – Conroe, TX	1–5	Monica Abbott (9–1)	Rachele Fico (0–2)	–	Nerissa Myers	275
Jul. 06	8:05 PM	**USSSA Florida Pride** (17–3)	Chicago Bandits (10–15)	Ballpark at Rosemont – Rosemont, Illinois	8–2	Kelsey Nunley (2–1)	Michelle Gascoigne (2–4)	–	Shelby Pendley	1133
Jul. 07	8:05 PM	Pennsylvania Rebellion (10–17)	**Chicago Bandits** (11–15)	Ballpark at Rosemont – Rosemont, Illinois	0–5	Sara Moulton (3–2)	Emily Weiman (2–6)	–	Sara Moulton	1059
Jul. 08	7:05 PM	**Scrap Yard Dawgs** (14–11)	Akron Racers (13–11)	Firestone Stadium – Akron, Ohio	5–1	Monica Abbott (10–1)	Jailyn Ford (5–5)	–	Monica Abbott	648
Jul. 08	8:35 PM	**Pennsylvania Rebellion** (11–17)	Chicago Bandits (11–16)	Ballpark at Rosemont – Rosemont, Illinois	3–2	Dallas Escobedo (2–4)	Angel Bunner (0–1)	Haylie Wagner S(4)	Dallas Escobedo	1249
Jul. 08	10:00 PM	**Dallas Charge** (8–15)	USSSA Florida Pride (17–4)	USD Softball Complex – San Diego, CA	4–3	Lauren Haeger (5–4)	Jolene Henderson (5–1)	Morgan Melloh S(1)	Lauren Haeger	718
Jul. 09	7:05 PM	Scrap Yard Dawgs (14–12)	**Akron Racers** (14–11)	Firestone Stadium – Akron, Ohio	4–6	Sarah Pauly (5–1)	Sara Driesenga (0–3)	Laura Winter S(1)	Sami Fagan	974
Jul. 09	8:35 PM	Pennsylvania Rebellion (11–18)	**Chicago Bandits** (12–16)	Ballpark at Rosemont – Rosemont, Illinois	3–4	Michelle Gascoigne (3–4)	Emily Weiman (2–7)	–	Sammy Marshall	1351
Jul. 09	10:00 PM	**Dallas Charge** (9–15)	USSSA Florida Pride (17–5)	USD Softball Complex – San Diego, CA	3–1, 9 innings	Morgan Melloh (1–4)	Keilani Ricketts (3–2)	–	Renada Davis	703
Jul. 11	7:00 PM	**Scrap Yard Dawgs** (15–12)	USSSA Florida Pride (17–6)	CommunityAmerica Ballpark – Kansas City, Kansas	4–3	Monica Abbott (11–1)	Jolene Henderson (5–2)	–	Kiki Stokes, Monica Abbott	1949
Jul. 11	7:05 PM	**Akron Racers** (15–11)	Pennsylvania Rebellion (11–19)	Consol Energy Park – Washington, Pennsylvania	2–0	Jailyn Ford (6–5)	Dallas Escobedo (2–5)	–	Jailyn Ford	1964
Jul. 12	7:00 PM	USSSA Florida Pride (17–7)	**Scrap Yard Dawgs** (16–12)	CommunityAmerica Ballpark – Kansas City, Kansas	7–8, 8 innings	Monica Abbott (12–1)	Keilani Ricketts (3–3)	–	Emily Crane	
Jul. 13	6:35 PM	**Akron Racers** (16–11)	Pennsylvania Rebellion (11–20)	Arthur W. Perdue Stadium – Salisbury, Maryland	5–4	Aimee Creger (3–1)	Emily Weiman (2–8)	–	Sami Fagan	4189
Jul. 13	TBA	Dallas Charge (9–16)	**USSSA Florida Pride** (18–7)	CommunityAmerica Ballpark – Kansas City, Kansas	3–6	Hannah Rogers (4–1)	Cheridan Hawkins (1–3)	Jordan Taylor S(5)	Kelly Kretschman	6141
Jul. 13	8:05 PM	**Scrap Yard Dawgs** (17–12)	Chicago Bandits (12–17)	Ballpark at Rosemont – Rosemont, Illinois	9–5	Ellen Renfroe Reed (2–1)	Morgan Foley (1–3)	Monica Abbott S(1)	Kiki Stokes	1130
Jul. 14	6:35 PM	**Akron Racers** (17–11)	Pennsylvania Rebellion (11–21)	Arthur W. Perdue Stadium – Salisbury, Maryland	4–2	Jailyn Ford (7–5)	Emily Weiman (2–9)	Rachele Fico S(1)		841
Jul. 14	8:00 PM	Dallas Charge (9–17)	**USSSA Florida Pride** (19–7)	CommunityAmerica Ballpark – Kansas City, Kansas	1–7	Keilani Ricketts (4–3)	Jill Compton (2–2)	–	Keilani Ricketts	1601
Jul. 14	8:05 PM	Scrap Yard Dawgs (17–13)	**Chicago Bandits** (13–17)	Ballpark at Rosemont – Rosemont, Illinois	1–4	Shelby Turnier (3–3)	Rachel Fox (2–3)	Michelle Gascoigne S(3)	Kellsi Kloss	960
Jul. 15	7:05 PM	Dallas Charge (9–18)	**Akron Racers** (18–11)	Firestone Stadium – Akron, Ohio	4–5, 8 innings	Rachele Fico (1–2)	Cheridan Hawkins (1–4)	–	Sami Fagan	531
Jul. 16	7:00 PM	Chicago Bandits	USSSA Florida Pride	Champion Stadium – Kissimmee, Florida	**Suspended (inclement weather)**(Resumed on:July 17)					
Jul. 16	7:05 PM	**Dallas Charge** (10–18)	Akron Racers (18–12)	Firestone Stadium – Akron, Ohio	3–0	Morgan Melloh (2–4)	Sarah Pauly (5–2)	–	Morgan Melloh	876
Jul. 17; Doubleheader/ resumed game	7:00 PM	Chicago Bandits (13–18)	**USSSA Florida Pride** (20–7)	Champion Stadium – Kissimmee, Florida	1–6	Chelsea Thomas (4–0)	Morgan Foley (1–4)	–	Kelly Kretschman	567
Jul. 17; Doubleheader/ resumed game	7:00 PM	**Chicago Bandits** (14–18)	USSSA Florida Pride (20–8)	Champion Stadium – Kissimmee, Florida	5–1	Shelby Turnier (4–3)	Jolene Henderson (5–3)	–	Shelby Turnier	612
Jul. 17	4:05 PM	Dallas Charge (10–19)	**Akron Racers** (19–12)	Firestone Stadium – Akron, Ohio	3–4	Jailyn Ford (8–5)	Cheridan Hawkins (1–5)	Rachele Fico S(2)	Alex Hugo	450
Jul. 18	TBA	**Chicago Bandits** (15–18)	USSSA Florida Pride (20–9)	Champion Stadium – Kissimmee, Florida	5–4	Angel Bunner (1–1)	Keilani Ricketts (4–4)	Angel Bunner	535	
Jul. 18	7:05 PM	**Scrap Yard Dawgs** (18–13)	Akron Racers (19–13)	Firestone Stadium – Akron, Ohio	3–0	Monica Abbott (13–1)	Sarah Pauly (5–3)	–	Monica Abbott	512
Jul. 19	7:05 PM	**Scrap Yard Dawgs** (19–13)	Akron Racers (19–14)	Firestone Stadium – Akron, Ohio	7–3	Ellen Renfroe Reed (3–1)	Aimee Creger (3–2)	–	Kiki Stokes	680
Jul. 19	8:05 PM	Dallas Charge (10–20)	**Chicago Bandits** (16–18)	Ballpark at Rosemont – Rosemont, Illinois	1–9	Sara Moulton (4–2)	Morgan Melloh (2–5)	–	Taylor Edwards	1172
Jul. 20	12:05 PM	**Dallas Charge** (11–20)	Chicago Bandits (16–19)	Ballpark at Rosemont – Rosemont, Illinois	4–3	Lauren Haeger (6–4)	Angel Bunner (1–2)	Morgan Melloh S(2)	Taylor Gadbois	1722
Jul. 20	12:05 PM	**Scrap Yard Dawgs** (20–13)	Akron Racers (19–15)	Firestone Stadium – Akron, Ohio	5–3	Rachel Fox (3–3)	Rachele Fico (1–3)	Monica Abbott S(2)	Taylore Fuller	421
Jul. 20	8:00 PM	Pennsylvania Rebellion (11–22)	**USSSA Florida Pride** (21–9)	Champion Stadium – Kissimmee, Florida	0–8	Kelsey Nunley (3–1)	Haylie Flyn (0–1)	–	Kelsey Nunley	7253
Jul. 21	7:00 PM	**Pennsylvania Rebellion** (12–22)	USSSA Florida Pride (21–10)	Champion Stadium – Kissimmee, Florida	10–3	Miranda Kramer (4–2)	Chelsea Thomas (4–1)	–	Miranda Kramer	502
Jul. 22	7:00 PM	Pennsylvania Rebellion (12–23)	**USSSA Florida Pride** (22–10)	Champion Stadium – Kissimmee, Florida	7–10	Jordan Taylor (2–0)	Haylie Wagner (2–4)	–	Lauren Chamberlain	478
Jul. 22	8:30 PM	Dallas Charge (11–21)	**Scrap Yard Dawgs** (21–13)	Scrap Yard Sports Complex – Conroe, TX	0–1	Monica Abbott (14–1)	Morgan Melloh (2–6)	–	Monica Abbott	190
Jul. 23	TBA	Akron Racers (19–16)	**USSSA Florida Pride** (23–10)	Champion Stadium – Kissimmee, Florida	1–4	Jolene Henderson (6–3)	Jailyn Ford (8–6)	–	Jolene Henderson	489
Jul. 23	8:00 PM	**Dallas Charge** (12–21)	Scrap Yard Dawgs (21–14)	Scrap Yard Sports Complex – Conroe, TX	3–1	Lauren Haeger (7–4)	Ellen Renfroe Reed (3–2)	–	Lauren Haeger	400
Jul. 24	5:00 PM	**Dallas Charge** (13–21)	Scrap Yard Dawgs (21–15)	Scrap Yard Sports Complex – Conroe, TX	5–3	Lauren Haeger (8–4)	Rachel Fox (3–4)	Morgan Melloh S(3)	Kylee Lahners	114
Jul. 24	TBA	Akron Racers (19–17)	**USSSA Florida Pride** (24–10)	Champion Stadium – Kissimmee, Florida	3–12	Kelsey Nunley (4–1)	Sarah Pauly (5–4)	–	Kelly Kretschman	494
Jul. 25	7:00 PM	Akron Racers (19–18)	**USSSA Florida Pride** (25–10)	Champion Stadium – Kissimmee, Florida	2–5	Keilani Ricketts (5–4)	Aimee Creger (3–3)	–	Kelly Kretschman	431
Jul. 25	8:05 PM	**Pennsylvania Rebellion** (13–23)	Chicago Bandits (16–20)	Ballpark at Rosemont – Rosemont, Illinois	2–0	Miranda Kramer (5–2)	Angel Bunner (1–3)	Emily Weiman S(2)	Miranda Kramer	1304
Jul. 26	8:05 PM	Pennsylvania Rebellion (13–24)	**Chicago Bandits** (17–20)	Ballpark at Rosemont – Rosemont, Illinois	3–9	Sara Moulton (5–2)	Dallas Escobedo (2–6)	Michelle Gascoigne S(4)	Taylor Edwards	1200
Jul. 27	5:30 PM	USSSA Florida Pride	Dallas Charge	The Ballfields at Craig Ranch – McKinney, Texas	**Postponed (inclement weather)**(Rescheduled as doubleheaders on:July 28 and 29)					
Jul. 27	8:30 PM	USSSA Florida Pride	Dallas Charge	The Ballfields at Craig Ranch – McKinney, Texas	**Postponed (inclement weather)**(Rescheduled as doubleheaders on:July 28 and 29)					
Jul. 27	7:05 PM	Chicago Bandits (17–21)	**Akron Racers** (20–18)	Firestone Stadium – Akron, Ohio	0–1	Jailyn Ford (9–6)	Shelby Turnier (4–4)	–	Jailyn Ford	546
Jul. 28	7:05 PM	**Scrap Yard Dawgs** (22–15)	Pennsylvania Rebellion (13–25)	TicketReturn.com Field at Pelican Park – Myrtle Beach, South Carolina	3–0	Monica Abbott (15–1)	Dallas Escobedo (2–7)	–	Amanda Fama	3494
Jul. 28	7:05 PM	**Chicago Bandits** (18–21)	Akron Racers (20–19)	Firestone Stadium – Akron, Ohio	6–3	Michelle Gascoigne (4–4)	Sarah Pauly (5–5)	–	Taylor Edwards	609
Jul. 28; Doubleheader/ postponed game	5:30 PM	**USSSA Florida Pride** (26–10)	Dallas Charge (13–22)	The Ballfields at Craig Ranch – McKinney, Texas	2–0	Jolene Henderson (7–3)	Vanessa Stokes (0–1)	–	Sierra Romero	
Jul. 28; Doubleheader/ postponed game	8:30 PM	**USSSA Florida Pride** (27–10)	Dallas Charge (13–23)	The Ballfields at Craig Ranch – McKinney, Texas	6–4	Hannah Rogers (5–1)	Lauren Haeger (8–5)	Jordan Taylor S(6)	Chelsea Coodacre	250
Jul. 29	7:05 PM	**Chicago Bandits** (19–21)	Akron Racers (20–20)	Firestone Stadium – Akron, Ohio	17–4	Lacey Waldrop (4–3)	Rachele Fico (1–4)	–	Brittany Cervantes	568
Jul. 29	7:05 PM	**Scrap Yard Dawgs** (23–15)	Pennsylvania Rebellion (13–26)	TicketReturn.com Field at Pelican Park – Myrtle Beach, South Carolina	8–1	Rachel Fox (4–4)	Miranda Kramer (5–3)	–	Madison Shipman	2745
Jul. 29; Doubleheader/ postponed game	5:30 PM	**USSSA Florida Pride** (28–10)	Dallas Charge (13–24)	The Ballfields at Craig Ranch – McKinney, Texas	3–0	Jordan Taylor (3–0)	Morgan Melloh (2–7)	–	Kirsti Merritt	788
Jul. 29; Doubleheader/ postponed game	8:30 PM	**USSSA Florida Pride** (29–10)	Dallas Charge (13–25)	The Ballfields at Craig Ranch – McKinney, Texas	5–2	Chelsea Thomas (5–1)	Vanessa Stokes (0–2)	Kelsey Nunley S(3)	Lauren Chamberlain	788
Jul. 30	7:05 PM	Chicago Bandits (19–22)	**Pennsylvania Rebellion** (14–26)	Consol Energy Park – Washington, Pennsylvania	3–5	Haylie Wagner (3–4)	Sara Moulton (5–3)	–	Stacey Porter	805
Jul. 31	2:05 PM	**Chicago Bandits** (20–22)	Pennsylvania Rebellion (14–27)	Consol Energy Park – Washington, Pennsylvania	5–4, 9 innings	Shelby Turnier (5–4)	Emily Weiman (2–10)	–	Danielle Zymkowitz	711
Jul. 31	4:30 PM	Akron Racers (20–21)	**Dallas Charge** (14–25)	The Ballfields at Craig Ranch – McKinney, Texas	8–10	Jill Compton (3–2)	Laura Winter (1–2)	Morgan Melloh S(4)	Kaylyn Castillo	612
Jul. 31; Doubleheader	TBA	Scrap Yard Dawgs (23–16)	**USSSA Florida Pride** (30–10)	JoAnne Graf Field at the Seminole Softball Complex – Tallahassee, Florida	11–2	Jolene Henderson (8–3)	Rachel Fox (4–5)	–	Jolene Henderson	259
Jul. 31; Doubleheader	8:00 PM	Scrap Yard Dawgs (23–17)	**USSSA Florida Pride** (31–10)	JoAnne Graf Field at the Seminole Softball Complex – Tallahassee, Florida	1–6	Kelsey Nunley (5–1)	Jaclyn Traina (0–2)	–	Shelby Pendley	259

August

Date	Time	Visitor	Home	Venue	Score	Win	Loss	Save	Player of the Game	Attendance
Aug. 01	7:00 PM	Scrap Yard Dawgs (23–18)	**USSSA Florida Pride** (32–10)	JoAnne Graf Field at the Seminole Softball Complex – Tallahassee, Florida	1–3	Chelsea Thomas (6–1)	Sara Driesenga (0–4)	Hannah Rogers S(1)	Megan Wiggins	198
Aug. 01	8:30 PM	**Akron Racers** (21–21)	Dallas Charge (14–26)	The Ballfields at Craig Ranch – McKinney, Texas	7–3	Sarah Pauly (6–5)	Lauren Haeger (8–6)	–	Sami Fagan	275
Aug. 02	7:00 PM	**Scrap Yard Dawgs** (24–18)	USSSA Florida Pride (32–11)	JoAnne Graf Field at the Seminole Softball Complex – Tallahassee, Florida	1=0	Rachel Fox (5–5)	Keilani Ricketts (5–5)	Monica Abbott S(3)	Rachel Fox	347
Aug. 02	8:30 PM	Akron Racers (21–22)	**Dallas Charge** (15–26)	The Ballfields at Craig Ranch – McKinney, Texas	0–1	Morgan Melloh (3–7)	Rachele Fico (1–5)	–	Morgan Melloh	291
Aug. 03	8:05 PM	USSSA Florida Pride (32–12)	**Chicago Bandits** (21–22)	Ballpark at Rosemont – Rosemont, Illinois	0–3	Lacey Waldrop (5–3)	Chelsea Thomas (6–2)	Michelle Gascoigne S(5)	Lacey Waldrop	1437
Aug. 04	8:05 PM	**USSSA Florida Pride** (33–12)	Chicago Bandits (21–23)	Ballpark at Rosemont – Rosemont, Illinois	6–3	Jolene Henderson (9–3)	Sara Moulton (5–4)	Jordan Taylor S(7)	Kelly Kretschman	1169
Aug. 04	8:30 PM	Akron Racers (21–23)	**Scrap Yard Dawgs** (25–18)	Scrap Yard Sports Complex – Conroe, TX	0–1	Monica Abbott (16–1)	Jailyn Ford (9–7)	–	Amanda Fama	155
Aug. 05	7:05 PM	Dallas Charge (15–27)	**Pennsylvania Rebellion** (15–27)	Consol Energy Park – Washington, Pennsylvania	0–3	Dallas Escobedo (3–7)	Lauren Haeger (8–7)	–	Dallas Escobedo	812
Aug. 05	8:30 PM	**Akron Racers** (22–23)	Scrap Yard Dawgs (25–19)	Scrap Yard Sports Complex – Conroe, TX	8–1	Sarah Pauly (7–5)	Jaclyn Traina (0–3)	–	Shellie Robionson	232
Aug. 05	8:35 PM	USSSA Florida Pride (33–13)	**Chicago Bandits** (22–23)	Ballpark at Rosemont – Rosemont, Illinois	3–4, 12 innings	Michelle Gascoigne (5–4)	Hannah Rogers (5–2)	–	Megan Blank	1929
Aug. 06	7:05 PM	**Dallas Charge** (16–27)	Pennsylvania Rebellion (15–28)	Consol Energy Park – Washington, Pennsylvania	6–2	Morgan Melloh (4–7)	Miranda Kramer (5–4)	–	Kylee Lahners	901
Aug. 06	8:00 PM	Akron Racers (22–24)	**Scrap Yard Dawgs** (26–19)	Scrap Yard Sports Complex – Conroe, TX	5–6	Monica Abbott (17–1)	Jailyn Ford (9–8)	–	Jade Rhodes	362
Aug. 07	6:05 PM	Dallas Charge (16–28)	**Pennsylvania Rebellion** (16–28)	Consol Energy Park – Washington, Pennsylvania	2–5	Emma Johnson (3–2)	Jill Compton (3–3)	Madison Osias S(1)	Chaley Brickey	751
Aug. 08	7:00 PM	**USSSA Florida Pride** (34–13)	Akron Racers (22–25)	Firestone Stadium – Akron, Ohio	7–3	Kelsey Nunley (6–1)	Jailyn Ford (9–9)	–	Chelsea Goodacre	1429
Aug. 09	7:00 PM	**USSSA Florida Pride** (35–13)	Akron Racers (22–26)	Firestone Stadium – Akron, Ohio	3–0, 5 innings (rain-shoertened)	Keilani Ricketts (6–5)	Sarah Pauly (7–6)	Hannah Rogers S(2)	Hallie Wilson	1166
Aug. 09	8:30 PM	Pennsylvania Rebellion (16–29)	**Scrap Yard Dawgs** (27–19)	Scrap Yard Sports Complex – Conroe, TX	0–7	Sara Driesenga (1–4)	Haylie Wagner (3–5)	–	Sara Driesenga	211
Aug. 09	8:30 PM	Chicago Bandits (22–24)	**Dallas Charge** (17–28)	The Ballfields at Craig Ranch – McKinney, Texas	6–16	Cheridan Hawkins (2–5)	Sara Moulton (5–5)	–	Kaitlyn Richardson	407
Aug. 10	7:00 PM	Akron Racers (22–27)	**USSSA Florida Pride** (36–13)	Melissa Cook Stadium – South Bend, IN	2–5	Chelsea Thomas (7–2)	Laura Winter (1–3)	Jordan Taylor S(8)	Lauren Chamberlain	
Aug. 10	8:30 PM	**Chicago Bandits** (23–24)	Dallas Charge (17–29)	The Ballfields at Craig Ranch – McKinney, Texas	4–1	Angel Bunner (2–3)	Jill Compton (3–4)	Michelle Gascoigne S(6)	Taylor Edwards	317
Aug. 10	8:30 PM	Pennsylvania Rebellion (16–30)	**Scrap Yard Dawgs** (28–19)	Scrap Yard Sports Complex – Conroe, TX	0–2	Monica Abbott (18–1)	Dallas Escobedo (3–8)	–	Madison Shipman	178
Aug. 11	8:30 PM	Pennsylvania Rebellion (16–31)	**Scrap Yard Dawgs** (29–19)	Scrap Yard Sports Complex – Conroe, TX	6–10	Sara Plourde (1–1)	Haylie Wagner (3–6)	–	Jade Rhodes	216
Aug. 11	8:30 PM	Chicago Bandits (23–25)	**Dallas Charge** (18–29)	The Ballfields at Craig Ranch – McKinney, Texas	0–5	Lauren Haeger (9–7)	Lacey Waldrop (5–4)	–	Lauren Haeger	403
Aug. 12	7:05 PM	**USSSA Florida Pride** (37–13)	Akron Racers (22–28)	Firestone Stadium – Akron, Ohio	4–3	Hannah Rogers (6–2)	Rachele Fico (1–6)	Jordan Taylor S(9)	Hallie Wilson	1369
Aug. 12	8:30 PM	Pennsylvania Rebellion	Dallas Charge	The Ballfields at Craig Ranch – McKinney, Texas	**Postponed (inclement weather)**(Played on:August 13)					
Aug. 13; Doubleheader/ postponed game	12:30 PM	**Pennsylvania Rebellion** (17–31)	Dallas Charge (18–30)	The Ballfields at Craig Ranch – McKinney, Texas	3–2	Dallas Escobedo (4–8)	Morgan Melloh (4–8)	–		462
Aug. 13; Doubleheader/ postponed game	Game 2	Pennsylvania Rebellion (17–32)	**Dallas Charge** (19–30)	The Ballfields at Craig Ranch – McKinney, Texas	2–3	Cheridan Hawkins (3–5)	Miranda Kramer (5–5)	Morgan Melloh S(5)		484
Aug. 13	8:00 PM	Chicago Bandits	Scrap Yard Dawgs	Scrap Yard Sports Complex – Conroe, TX	**Canceled (inclement weather)**					
Aug. 14	12:30 PM	Pennsylvania Rebellion (17–33)	**Dallas Charge** (20–30)	The Ballfields at Craig Ranch – McKinney, Texas	1–4	Lauren Haeger (10–7)	Emma Johnson (3–3)	Jill Compton S(1)	Taylor Gadbois	382
Aug. 14	2:00 PM	Chicago Bandits	Scrap Yard Dawgs	Scrap Yard Sports Complex – Conroe, TX	**Canceled (inclement weather)**					

== NPF Championship ==
The 2016 NPF Championship was held at Rhoads Stadium on the campus of the University of Alabama in Tuscaloosa, Alabama, from August 19–23.

Logo for the 2016 NPF Championship Series

NPF Semifinals
1	USSSA Florida Pride	2
4	Akron Racers	0
2	Scrap Yard Dawgs	1
3	Chicago Bandits	2

NPF Championship
1	USSSA Pride	1
3	Chicago Bandits	2

2016 NPF Semifinals USSSA Pride defeat Akron Racers, 2–0
Game	Date	Score	Winning Pitcher	Save	Losing Pitcher	Player of the Game	Series (USSSA–AKR)
1	Aug 19	USSSA Pride 3, Akron Racers 0	Keilani Ricketts	–	Jailyn Ford	Keilani Ricketts	1–0
2	Aug 21	USSSA Pride 6, Akron Racers 2	Jolene Henderson	–	Sarah Pauly	Jolene Henderson	2–0

2016 NPF Semifinals Chicago Bandits defeat Scrap Yard Dawgs, 2–1
Game	Date	Score	Winning Pitcher	Save	Losing Pitcher	Player of the Game	Series (SY-CH)
1	Aug 19	Scrap Yard Dawgs 2, Chicago Bandits 11	Angel Bunner	–	Monica Abbott		0–1
2	Aug 20	Scrap Yard Dawgs 10, Chicago Bandits 1 rain-shortened, 5 innings	Monica Abbott	–	Michelle Gascoigne	Kiki Stokes	1–1
3	Aug 21	Scrap Yard Dawgs 1, Chicago Bandits 2	Shelby Turnier	–	Monica Abbott	Shelby Turnier	1–2

2016 NPF Championship Series Chicago Bandits defeat USSSA Pride, 2–1
Game	Date	Score	Winning Pitcher	Save	Losing Pitcher	Player of the Game	Series (USSSA–CHI)
1	Aug 21	USSSA Pride 3, Chicago Bandits 1	Keilani Ricketts	Jordan Taylor	Morgan Foley		1–0
2	Aug 22	USSSA Pride 5, Chicago Bandits 11	Michelle Gascoigne	Shelby Turnier	Jolene Henderson	Jill Barrett	1–1
3	Aug 23	USSSA Pride 1, Chicago Bandits 2	Angel Bunner	Shelby Turnier	Keilani Ricketts		1–2

=== Championship Game ===
Team	Top Batter	Stats.
Chicago Bandits	Brittany Cervantes	1–3 RBI HR
USSSA Pride	Kelly Kretschman	2–3 RBI HR

Team	Pitcher	IP	H	R	ER	BB	SO
Chicago Bandits	Angel Bunner (W)	6.0	8	1	1	1	1
Chicago Bandits	Shelby Turnier (SV)	1.0	0	0	0	0	0
USSSA Pride	Keilani Ricketts (L)	4.1	5	2	2	1	5
USSSA Pride	Jordan Taylor	2.2	0	0	0	0	3

2016 NPF Championship Series MVP
Player	Club	Stats.
Brittany Cervantes	Chicago Bandits	.470 (8/17) 3RBIs 2HRs BB

== Statistical leaders ==
Through 8/14/16 Source:ProFastpitch.com

League Leaders Summary as of August 14, 2016 (All games)

Team	avg	G	ab	r	h	2b	3b	hr	rbi	tb	slg%	bb	hbp	so	gdp	ob%	sf	sh	sb-att	po	a	e	fld%
USSSA Pride	.296	50	1405	257	416	57	8	64	245	681	.485	142	41	214	8	.373	18	18	62-76	1064	409	35	.977
Chicago Bandits	.273	48	1337	218	365	49	9	30	190	522	.390	144	34	238	6	.357	8	26	49-58	993	383	36	.975
Akron Racers	.257	50	1340	225	345	54	8	57	215	586	.437	140	32	299	5	.340	9	18	28-37	1017	308	45	.967
Scrap Yard Dawgs	.252	48	1237	193	312	39	8	47	177	508	.411	175	31	311	8	.357	8	32	41-58	987	376	45	.968
Pennsylvania Rebellion	.250	50	1327	173	332	42	7	33	157	487	.367	106	37	237	4	.321	9	28	53-66	1020	308	42	.969
Dallas Charge	.243	50	1325	172	322	42	4	41	164	495	.374	125	27	283	7	.319	7	16	34-43	1021	337	45	.968
Totals	.262	296	7971	1238	2092	283	44	272	1148	3279	.411	832	202	1582	38	.345	59	138	267-338	6102	2121	248	.971

Team	era	w-l	g	cg	sho	sv	ip	h	r	er	bb	so	2b	3b	hr	ab	b/avg	wp	hbp	bk	sfa	sha
USSSA Pride	2.33	37-13	50	7	8/4	14	354.2	303	144	118	103	326	42	4	30	1338	.226	13	30	1	6	22
Scrap Yard Dawgs	3.04	29-19	48	17	11/4	4	329.0	314	174	143	111	266	55	10	22	1273	.247	12	29	7	11	18
Pennsylvania Rebellion	3.87	17-33	50	9	2/1	7	340.0	376	217	188	137	261	42	7	54	1352	.278	9	24	0	12	27
Dallas Charge	4.13	20-30	50	16	6/0	6	340.1	352	235	201	190	265	42	8	52	1337	.263	22	42	6	10	22
Akron Racers	4.23	22-28	50	16	4/0	6	339.0	382	233	205	144	240	39	5	69	1359	.281	14	45	4	9	32
Chicago Bandits	4.40	22-25	48	11	2/1	7	331.0	365	235	208	147	224	63	10	45	1312	.278	18	32	4	11	17
Totals	3.66	147-148	296	76	33/10	44	2034.0	2092	1238	1063	832	1582	283	44	272	7971	.262	88	202	22	59	138

Player	avg	gp-gs	ab	r	h	2b	3b	hr	rbi	tb	slg%	bb	hbp	so	gdp	ob%	sf	sh	sb-att
Kelly Kretschman, FL	.466	48-47	133	42	62	9	0	13	45	110	.827	31	5	15	1	.563	5	0	13-15
Sami Fagan, AK	.392	48-48	158	34	62	10	2	9	39	103	.652	12	0	18	0	.430	2	3	0-0
Nerissa Myers, SY	.389	48-47	131	33	51	10	0	6	22	79	.603	33	4	14	0	.524	0	2	3-7
Taylor Edwards, CH	.353	43-43	133	22	47	9	2	10	34	90	.677	21	4	20	0	.453	1	0	0-0
Shelby Pendley, FL	.351	50-50	148	30	52	9	0	9	34	88	.595	29	4	21	1	.459	4	0	7-9
Jill Barrett, CH	.345	48-48	171	27	59	5	0	0	12	64	.374	11	1	20	0	.388	0	3	5-6
Hallie Wilson, FL	.338	49-45	136	25	46	5	1	3	20	62	.456	10	7	16	0	.412	0	0	4-7
Taylor Gadbois, DA	.331	48-47	157	29	52	3	1	1	8	60	.382	7	1	29	0	.364	0	4	14-17
Danielle Zymkowitz, CH	.310	47-47	145	21	45	3	3	0	19	54	.372	13	2	16	0	.375	0	4	3-4
Ashley Thomas,AK	.306	49-49	147	26	45	5	3	6	17	74	.503	5	1	22	0	.331	1	3	3-3
Kiki Stokes, SY	.304	40-40	115	23	35	6	1	7	20	64	.557	13	4	26	1	.385	3	0	5-6
Kayla Winkfield, PA	.296	37-35	108	16	32	5	1	2	12	45	.417	6	3	23	0	.350	0	2	6-10
Alisa Goler, PA	.295	44-41	129	13	38	9	0	2	17	53	.411	13	0	18	0	.359	0	0	1-2
Shellie Robinson, AK	.292	40-35	113	17	33	7	1	3	25	51	.451	6	0	31	1	.320	3	0	1-1
Megan Wiggins, FL	.288	50-49	177	35	51	7	3	10	24	94	.531	14	4	21	0	.354	0	1	11-14
Lauren Haeger, DA	.286	48-48	147	11	42	5	0	7	33	68	.463	10	1	18	2	.333	1	1	0-0
Taylor Schlopy, AK	.282	50-50	149	34	42	10	1	9	27	81	.544	28	8	33	3	.419	1	0	4-6
Megan Blank, CH	.281	41-37	114	13	32	6	0	3	21	47	.412	11	5	7	0	.369	0	4	2-3
Amanda Fama, SY	.273	47-47	121	19	33	6	0	3	17	48	.397	11	4	30	0	.350	1	4	0-0
Brittany Cervantes,CH	.260	44-43	123	24	32	5	0	7	23	58	.472	33	2	33	2	.414	4	0	4-4

Player	era	w-l	app-gs	cg	sho	sv	ip	h	r	er	bb	so	2b	3b	hr	ab	b/avg	wp	hbp	bk
Monica Abbott, SY	0.72	18-1	23-17	12	7/2	3	125.2	66	14	13	30	167	3	1	4	433	.152	2	7	6
Jordan Taylor, FL	0.74	3-0	23-1	0	0/3	9	38.0	12	5	4	9	52	3	0	3	127	.094	3	3	0
Jolene Henderson, FL	2.00	9-3	14-11	2	1/1	0	63.0	56	24	18	11	50	7	2	6	242	.231	0	4	0
Kelsey Nunley, FL	2.45	6-1	17-8	2	2/0	3	54.1	47	21	19	20	60	9	1	3	204	.230	2	7	0
Dallas Escobedo, PA	2.62	4-8	20-12	5	1/0	0	82.2	81	41	31	29	86	8	1	13	319	.254	3	2	0
Hannah Rogers,FL	2.62	6-2	17-7	0	0/1	2	56.0	54	22	21	19	40	9	1	6	213	.254	0	7	0
Madi Osias, PA	2.62	0-0	6-1	0	0/0	1	10.2	11	7	4	6	2	2	1	3	45	.244	0	0	0
Keilani Ricketts, FL	2.64	6-5	18-11	1	0/3	0	79.2	71	37	30	13	79	9	0	4	302	.235	4	7	1
Chelsea Thomas, FL	2.86	7-2	13-12	2	1/0	0	63.2	63	35	26	31	45	5	0	8	250	.252	4	2	0
Sara Nevins, SY	2.90	1-1	5-3	1	0/0	0	19.1	14	10	8	13	10	1	0	0	69	.203	0	3	0
Michelle Gascoigne, CH	2.96	5-4	21-8	5	0/1	6	75.2	71	40	32	35	72	6	2	11	282	.252	7	3	0
Ellen Renfroe Reed, SY	3.00	3-2	10-4	1	0/1	0	32.2	37	17	14	12	18	8	1	2	132	.280	0	2	0
Lauren Haeger, DA	3.01	10-7	23-16	9	3/0	0	111.2	91	56	48	57	100	12	2	19	419	.217	6	9	0
Morgan Melloh, DA	3.04	4-8	21-13	5	2/0	5	78.1	67	44	34	58	79	4	4	8	289	.232	2	10	1
Emily Weiman, PA	3.15	2-10	23-9	1	0/1	2	71.0	77	36	32	25	46	10	2	9	288	.267	0	6	0
Sarah Pauly, AK	3.45	7-6	18-16	8	2/0	1	87.1	101	49	43	36	60	14	1	16	359	.281	0	6	2
Sara Driesenga, SY	3.48	1-4	15-6	1	0/2	0	56.1	61	37	28	20	34	12	3	3	227	.269	1	7	0
Angel Bunner, CH	3.55	1-3	10-9	0	0/0	0	45.1	55	27	23	9	25	8	1	7	190	.289	1	3	1
Vanesa Stokes, DA	3.67	0-2	10-3	0	0/0	0	21.0	22	11	11	9	12	6	0	3	81	.272	1	2	0
Jailyn Ford, AK	3.69	9-9	25-17	6	2/0	2	98.2	95	58	52	31	75	9	1	16	376	.253	3	14	0

Batting avg
Kelly Kretschman-FL	.466
Sami Fagan-AK	.392
Nerissa Myers-SY	.389
Taylor Edwards-CH	.353
Shelby Pendley-FL	.351

Slugging pct
Kelly Kretschman-FL	.827
Taylor Edwards-CH	.677
Sami Fagan-AK	.652
Nerissa Myers-SY	.603
Shelby Pendley-FL	.595

On base pct
Kelly Kretschman-FL	.563
Nerissa Myers-SY	.524
Shelby Pendley-FL	.459
Taylor Edwards-CH	.453
Sami Fagan-AK	.430

Runs scored
Kelly Kretschman-FL	42
Megan Wiggins-FL	35
Taylor Schlopy-AK	34
Sami Fagan-AK	34
Nerissa Myers-SY	33

Hits
Sami Fagan-AK	62
Kelly Kretschman-FL	62
Jill Barrett-CH	59
Taylor Gadbois-DA	52
Shelby Pendley-FL	52

Runs batted in
Kelly Kretschman-FL	45
Sami Fagan-AK	39
Taylor Edwards-CH	34
Shelby Pendley-FL	34
Lauren Haeger-DA	33

Doubles
Nerissa Myers-SY	10
Taylor Schlopy-AK	10
Sami Fagan-AK	10
4 tied with	9

Triples
Ashley Thomas-AK	3
Megan Wiggins-FL	3
Britt Vonk-SY	3
Danielle Zymkowitz-CH	3
7 tied with	2

Home runs
Kelly Kretschman-FL	13
Megan Wiggins-FL	10
Taylor Edwards-CH	10
Sam Fischer-AK	10
3 tied with	9

Stolen bases
Sammy Marshall-CH	15
AJ Andrews-AK	15
Taylor Gadbois-DA	14
Kelly Kretschman-FL	13
Lindsey Stephens-PA	12

Earned run avg
Monica Abbott-SY	0.72
Jordan Taylor-FL	0.74
Jolene Henderson-FL	2.00
Kelsey Nunley-AK	2.45
Dallas Escobedo-PA	2.62

Opposing bat avg
Jordan Taylor-FL	.094
Monica Abbott-SY	.152
Sara Nevins-SY	.203
Lauren Haeger-DA	.217
Shelby Turnier-CH	.227

Innings pitched
Monica Abbott-SY	125.2
Lauren Haeger-DA	111.2
Jailyn Ford-AK	98.2
Sarah Pauly-AK	87.1
Dallas Escobedo-PA	82.2

Batters struck out
Monica Abbott-SY	167
Lauren Haeger-DA	100
Dallas Escobedo-PA	86
Morgan Melloh-DA	79
Keilani Ricketts-FL	79

Wins
Monica Abbott-SY	18
Lauren Haeger-DA	10
Jolene Henderson-FL	9
Jailyn Ford-AK	9
2 tied at	7

Saves
Jordan Taylor-FL	9
Michelle Gascoigne-CH	6
Morgan Melloh-DA	5
Haylie Wagner-PA	4
2 tied at	3

== Players of the Week ==
Week		Pitcher of the Week			Rookie of the Week			Offensive Player of the Week		
Week		Player(s)	Team(s)	Highlights	Player(s)	Team(s)	Highlights	Player(s)	Team(s)	Highlights
1	May 31 – June 5	Sara Nevins	Scrap Yard Dawgs	W/L:1-0, IP:16, ERA:1.31, SO:7, OBA:.179	Amanda Fama	Scrap Yard Dawgs	BA:.556, OBP:.643, RBI:1, R:2, BB:2, HBP:2, SB:1-1	Alexa Peterson	Pennsylvania Rebellion	BA:.545, HR:1, 2B:1, OBP:.615, SLG%:.909, RBI:5, R:3, SB:1-1
2	June 6–12	Jailyn Ford	Akron Racers	W/L:2-0, IP:13, R:1, SO:11, SAVE:1	Sami Fagan	Akron Racers	BA:.500, HR:1, R:4, BB:3	Kelley Montalvo	Akron Racers	BA:.625, HR:1, RBI:5, R:4, BB:4
3	June 13–19	Monica Abbott	Scrap Yard Dawgs	W/L:3-0, IP:19, R:3, SO:34	Alex Hugo	Akron Racers	BA:.428, HR:1, RBI:3, R:2	Kelly Kretschman	USSSA Florida Pride	BA:.550, HR:2, RBI:4, R:4
4	June 20–26	Monica Abbott	Scrap Yard Dawgs	W/L:2-0, IP:12.2, R:0, SO:11, OBA:.191	Sierra Romero	USSSA Florida Pride	BA:.471, HR:1, 2B:2, RBI:5	Sam Fischer	Akron Racers	BA:.333, HR:4, RBI:4
5	June 27 – July 3	Monica Abbott	Scrap Yard Dawgs		Britt Vonk	Scrap Yard Dawgs		Sami Fagan	Akron Racers	
6	July 4–10	Dallas Escobedo	Pennsylvania Rebellion	W/L:2-0, ERA:0.68, IP:10.1, R:1, SO:7, OBA:.179	Sami Fagan	Akron Racers	BA:.500, 2B:1, HR:1, RBI:6, R:3, SLG:.929	Megan Blank	Chicago Bandits	BA:.636, 2B:3, RBI:4, SLG:.909
7	July 11–17	Jailyn Ford	Akron Racers	W/L:3-0, ERA:1.62, IP:17.1, SO:15	Amanda Fama	Scrap Yard Dawgs	BA:.429, 2B:2, HR:2, RBI:5, R:4, SLG:1.000	Kelly Kretschman	USSSA Florida Pride	BA:.444, HR:2, RBI:7, R:8, BB:4, OBP:.545
8	July 18–24	Monica Abbott	Scrap Yard Dawgs	W/L:2-0, ERA:0.00, IP:17.1, SO:25 CG:2 ShO:2 OBA:.089	Taylor Gadbois	Dallas Charge	BA:.412, SB:3, R:5	Kelly Kretschman	USSSA Florida Pride	BA:.529, HR:3, RBI:9, 2B:1, R:7, SLG:1.118
9	July 25–31	Jolene Henderson	USSSA Florida Pride	W/L:2-0, ERA:1.17, IP:12, SO:13 CG:1 ShO:1	Sami Fagan	Akron Racers	BA:.438, 2B:2, BB:2, OBP:.500	Taylor Edwards	Chicago Bandits	BA:.500, HR:3, RBI:10, 2B:2, SLG:.923
10	August 1–7	Morgan Melloh	Dallas Charge	W/L:2-0, ERA:0.00, IP:14, SO:15 CG:2 ShO:1	Sami Fagan	Akron Racers	BA:.529, HR:2, RBI:5, R:5, SLG:.941	Kelly Kretschman	USSSA Florida Pride	BA:.600, HR:1, RBI:5, 2B:2, SLG:1.100
11	August 8–14	Lauren Haeger	Dallas Charge	W/L:2-0, a no-hitter, IP:11, SO:4 OBA:.029	Stacey Porter	Pennsylvania Rebellion	BA:.556, 2B:2, BB:5, OBP:.667	Lauren Haeger	Dallas Charge	BA:.538, HR:2, RBI:6, 2B:2, R:3, OBP:.600, SLG:1.154

== Annual awards ==
The 2016 NPF Award Banquet was held August 18 at Embassy Suites in Tuscaloosa. In addition to the usual state of annual awards, Kelly Kretschman received a special award for being the first NPF player to win the Triple Crown (lead the league in batting average. home runs, and RBI). NPF also awarded Appreciation Awards to Larry Brushett, softball representative form Mizuno, and Dina Kwit, Chicago Bandits photographer. Rawling presented a Gold Glove to a female athlete, A.J. Andrews of the Akron Racers, for the first time as well.

Award	Player	Team
Player of the Year Award	Kelly Kretschman	USSSA Florida Pride
Pitcher of the Year	Monica Abbott	Scrap Yard Dawgs
Gold Glove Presented by Rawlings	AJ Andrews	Akron Racers
Offensive Player of the Year	Kelly Kretschman	USSSA Pride
Rookie of the Year	Sami Fagan	Akron Racers
Rally Spikes Award (Note: The Rally Spikes Award is given to the player(s) with the most stolen bases)	AJ Andrews	Akron Racers
Rally Spikes Award	Sammy Marshall	Chicago Bandits
Home Run Award (Note: The Home Run Award goes to the player who hit the most home runs)	Kelly Kretschman	USSSA Pride
Jennie Finch Award (Note: The Jennie Finch award is given to the player who best exemplifies the character and qualities of its famous namesake, and who is considered to positively impact the game both on and off the field.)	Lauren Chamberlain	USSSA Pride
Appreciation Award	Larry Brushett	
Appreciation Award	Dina Kwit	
NPF Cup (Note: The NPF Cup goes to the team with the best regular season record)	USSSA Pride	
Coaching Staff of the Year	USSSA Pride	
Triple Crown Award (Note: Kelly Kretschman was recognized with this award for being the first NPF player to win the triple crown (lead the league in batting average, home runs, and RBI)	Kelly Kretschman	USSSA Pride

== All-NPF Team ==
2016 All-NPF Team
Position	Name	Team
Catcher	Griffin Joiner	Akron Racers
First base	Alisa Goler	Pennsylvania Rebellion
Second base	Nerissa Myers	Scrap Yard Dawgs
Third base	Kelley Montalvo	Akron Racers
Shortstop	Sami Fagan	Akron Racers
Outfield	Kelly Kretschman	USSSA Pride
Outfield	Megan Wiggins	USSSA Pride
Outfield	Taylor Schlopy	Akron Racers
Pitcher	Monica Abbott	Scrap Yard Dawgs
Pitcher	Jordan Taylor	USSSA Pride
Pitcher	Jolene Henderson	USSSA Pride
Pitcher	Kelsey Nunley	USSSA Pride
Utility	Taylor Edwards	Chicago Bandits
At Large	Shelby Pendley	USSSA Pride
At Large	Taylor Gadbois	Dallas Charge
At Large	Hallie Wilson	USSSA Pride
At Large	Jill Barrett	Chicago Bandits
At Large	Lauren Haeger	Dallas Charge
At Large	Danielle Zymkowitz	Chicago Bandits

== See also ==
- List of professional sports leagues
- List of professional sports teams in the United States and Canada
