= 2016 NPF Draft =

2016 NPF College Draft

General information
- Sport: Softball
- Date: April 14, 2016
- Time: 7:00 pm CST
- Location: Nashville, Tennessee
- Network: CBS Sports Network

Overview
- 40 selections total selections
- League: National Pro Fastpitch
- Teams: 6
- First selection: Lexie Elkins C Louisiana–Lafayette selected by Pennsylvania Rebellion
- Most selections: Akron Racers, Dallas Charge, Pennsylvania Rebellion, Scrap Yard Dawgs, USSSA Florida Pride, 8 picks each
- Fewest selections: Dallas Charge, Chicago Bandits, 4 picks each

National Pro Fastpitch held two drafts before the 2016 season:

First, the 2016 NPF Expansion Draft was held for the expansion Scrap Yard Dawgs to acquire players for their inaugural roster from existing NPF teams.

With the arrival of the expansion Dallas Charge, NPF created a process for expansion teams to acquire talent: choosing either one player via a 'Market Choice Selection' (a college player either who is from the expansion team's state or who played for a college in the expansion team's state) or five players from an Expansion Draft. The Dawgs opted for the Expansion Draft.

Secondly, the 2016 NPF College Draft was the 13th annual collegiate draft for NPF.

== Expansion Draft ==
On November 30, 2015, it was announced that the following players were selected by the Scrap Yard Dawgs in the 2015 NPF Expansion Draft: (Only Koerner and Washington actually played for the Dawgs; Low and Freeman retired before the season, and Garcia was released.)

Player	Previous Team
Megan Low	Akron Racers
Sami Garcia	Pennsylvania Rebellion
Amber Freeman	USSSA Florida Pride
Emilee Koerner	USSSA Florida Pride
Brejae Washington	USSSA Florida Pride

== College Draft ==
The 2016 NPF College Draft was the 13th annual collegiate draft for NPF, and was held on Thursday, April 14, 2016, 7:00 pm CST at the CMA Theater in the Country Music Hall of Fame and Museum in Nashville, Tennessee. Draft order was determined by regular season standings from 2015, but subsequent trades and transactions altered the overall draft order. The draft was broadcast live on CBS Sports Network. The first selection was catcher Lexie Elkins from Louisiana–Lafayette, picked by the Pennsylvania Rebellion.

Drafting an athlete gives an NPF affiliate team the rights to that athlete for two full seasons.

=== Draft Selections ===
NPF announced the draft order here With the addition of the Scrap Yard Dawgs, a league expansion team for the 2016 season, the added four additional bonus selections for the Dawgs.

Following are the 40 selections from the 2016 NPF draft:

Position key:
C = catcher; INF = infielder; SS = shortstop; OF = outfielder; UT = Utility infielder; P = pitcher; RHP = right-handed pitcher; LHP = left-handed pitcher
Positions will be listed as combined for those who can play multiple positions.

^{+}	Denotes player who has been selected to at least one All-NPF team
^{#}	Denotes player who has not played in the NPF

==== Round 1 ====
Pick	Player	Pos.	NPF Team	College
1	Lexie Elkins	C	Pennsylvania Rebellion	Louisiana–Lafayette
2	Sierra Romero^{+}	INF	USSSA Florida Pride (Note: USSSA Florida Pride → Dallas Charge 17 March 2015: USSSA Florida Pride traded 2015 4th overall draft pick for the Dallas Charge 2016 first round draft pick)	Michigan
3	Jailyn Ford	LHP/UT	Akron Racers	James Madison
4	Sami Fagan^{+}	INF	Akron Racers (Note: Akron Racers → Chicago Bandits 18 November 2015: Akron Racers traded Jill Barrett to Chicago Bandits for AJ Andrews and the #4 and #31 overall picks in the 2016 NPF College Draft)	Missouri
5	Kelsey Nunley^{+}	RHP	USSSA Florida Pride	Kentucky
6	Kiki Stokes	OF	Scrap Yard Dawgs	Nebraska

==== Round 2 ====
Pick	Player	Pos.	NPF Team	College
7	Emily Crane	OF	Scrap Yard Dawgs	Missouri
8	Allexis Bennett (Note: Bennett did not play for the Rebellion, but did join the NPF in 2017 with the Scrap Yard Dawgs.)^{+}	OF	Pennsylvania Rebellion	UCLA
9	Caitlyn Attfield	INF	Dallas Charge	UAB
10	Alex Hugo	INF	Akron Racers	Georgia
11	Shelby Turnier^{+}	P	Chicago Bandits	UCF
12	Kelsey Stewart	INF	USSSA Florida Pride	Florida

==== Round 3 ====
Pick	Player	Pos.	NPF Team	College
13	Haylie McCleney	OF	USSSA Florida Pride (Note: USSSA Florida Pride → Scrap Yard Dawgs 8 April 2016: USSSA Florida Pride traded Madison Shipman and Brigette Del Ponte to the Scrap Yard Dawgs in exchange for the 2016 13th Overall Draft Pick and the 2017 2nd and 3rd Round Draft Pick.)	Alabama
14	Chelsea Wilkinson^{#}	RHP	Pennsylvania Rebellion	Georgia
15	Taylor Gadbois^{+}	OF	Dallas Charge	Missouri
16	Chaley Brickey	INF	Pennsylvania Rebellion (Note: Akron Racers → Pennsylvania Rebellion 27 January 2015: Pennsylvania Rebellion traded RHP Sarah Pauly to the Akron Racers for the Racers #8 Overall Pick in the 2015 NPF Draft and the Racers 3rd Round Pick in the 2016 NPF Draft.)	Kansas
17	Kellsi Kloss	C	Chicago Bandits	LSU
18	Erica Field	C/UT	USSSA Florida Pride	James Madison
19	Lexi Overstreet	C/IF	Scrap Yard Dawgs	Tennessee

==== Round 4 ====
Pick	Player	Pos.	NPF Team	College
20	Geri Ann Glasco	UT	Akron Racers (Note: Akron Racers → Scrap Yard Dawgs 18 January 2016: Akron Racers traded Nerissa Myers to the Scrap Yard Dawgs for the 1st Selection in 4th Round of 2016 Draft and 1st Selection in 5th Round of 2017 Draft.)	Oregon
21	Lindsey Stephens	OF	Pennsylvania Rebellion	Texas
22	Emily Carosone^{+}	INF	Chicago Bandits (Note: Chicago Bandits → Dallas Charge 4 February 2015: Chicago Bandits trade Kaylyn Castillo to Dallas Charge in exchange for Charge's 4th Round Draft Pick in 2016.)	Auburn
23	Sandra Simmons	INF	Akron Racers	LSU
24	Kristen Brown	SS	Chicago Bandits	North Carolina
25	Kirsti Merritt	OF	USSSA Florida Pride	Florida
26	Christian Stokes	INF	Scrap Yard Dawgs	Kentucky

==== Round 5 ====
Pick	Player	Pos.	NPF Team	College
27	Sara Driesenga	RHP	Scrap Yard Dawgs	Michigan
28	Brittany Gomez	UT	Pennsylvania Rebellion	Iowa State
29	Cheridan Hawkins	LHP	Dallas Charge	Oregon
30	Hannah Day	C/OF	Akron Racers	Troy
31	Emily Messer	UT	Akron Racers (Note: Akron Racers → Chicago Bandits 18 November 2015: Akron Racers traded Jill Barrett to Chicago Bandits for AJ Andrews and the #4 and #31 overall picks in the 2016 NPF College Draft.)	South Alabama
32	Heather Stearns^{#}	RHP	USSSA Florida Pride	Baylor
33	Lee Ann Spivey	C/OF	Scrap Yard Dawgs	USF

==== Round 6 ====
Pick	Player	Pos.	NPF Team	College
34	Taylore Fuller	UT	Scrap Yard Dawgs	Florida
35	Kayla Winkfield	INF	Pennsylvania Rebellion	Mississippi State
36	Bianka Bell^{+} (Note: Bell did not play for the Rebellion, but did join the NPF in 2017 with the USSSA Pride.)	INF	Pennsylvania Rebellion (Note: Dallas Charge → Pennsylvania Rebellion 11 June 2015: Nicole Morgan's contract was reinstated to the Pennsylvania Rebellion, and then Morgan was traded to the Dallas Charge in exchange for the Dallas Charge 2016 6th Round Draft Pick and the Dallas Charge 2017 3rd Round Draft Pick.)	LSU
37	Hannah Perryman	LHP	Akron Racers	Missouri St. Louis
38	Alyssa Gillespie^{#}	OF	Dallas Charge (Note: Dallas Charge → Chicago Bandits 8 February 2016: Chicago Bandits trade their 2016 NPF College Draft - 6th Round Pick to the Dallas Charge in exchange for the Dallas Charge 6th Round Pick in the 2017 NPF College Draft.)	Oregon
39	Aubree Munro	C	USSSA Florida Pride	Florida
40	Mikela Manewa	INF	Scrap Yard Dawgs	Oregon State

==== Draft notes ====
Round 1:

Round 2:

Round 3:

Round 4:

Round 5:

Round 6:
