= Rachel Fox =

Rachel Fox may refer to:

- Rachel G. Fox (born 1996), American actress
- Rachel Fox (softball) (born 1991), American softball player and coach
- Rachel Crosbee (née Fox, born 1969), British canoeist
