= Texas Charge =

Women's professional softball team

- [[File: |frameless|class=pageimage|alt=]] Logo

Information
- League: National Pro Fastpitch (former)
- Location: San Marcos, Texas
- Ballpark: Bobcat Softball Stadium
- Founded: January 8, 2015; 10 years ago
- Folded: 2017
- League championships: 0
- Ownership: Joel Bartsch
- General manager: Scott Smith
- Coach: Roman Foore

The Texas Charge were a women's professional softball team based in San Marcos, Texas. The team began play as the Dallas Charge as a member of National Pro Fastpitch (NPF) with a game on June 3, 2015. They were initially headquartered in the Dallas–Fort Worth, Texas area, with most home games at The Ballfields at Craig Ranch.

== Seasons ==
Inaugural season

When the Dallas team was publicly announced, NPF also revealed its general manager would be Kevin Shelton, who had experience heading the Texas Glory youth program. The Charge hired former Olympian Jennifer McFalls to be their first head coach. Later, Chez Sievers was added as an assistant coach.

Jolene Henderson signed with the Charge in January 2015, becoming their first player. Other transactions included signing former Texas Longhorns shortstop Taylor Thom, and the Charge trading their fourth round pick in the 2016 NPF Draft to the Chicago Bandits for catcher Kaylyn Castillo. Later, infielder Natalie Villarreal became the first player from the Dallas area to join the Charge. Then, the Charge signed pitcher Morgan Melloh, who had played the previous three years in the Japan Softball League after spending 2011 and 2012 in the NPF. The club then added five-year veteran Angeline Quiocho. Texas Tech's all-time home run leader, outfielder Mikey Kenney, and pitcher Bailey Watts were next to join. Texas native and catcher Molly Fichtner, and pitcher Sarah Purvis of Georgia Southern were the next additions to the Charge.

Dallas' next signings were international ones. Australian National Team pitcher Vanessa Stokes signed with the Charge. She is the first indigenous softball player ever to pitch for Australia, and the first Australian to sign with the NPF. Next, the Charge set their sights on Japan. Olympic gold medalist outfielder Eri Yamada, and the Japan League's 2013 and 2014 Catcher of the Year Kazuki Watanabe joined the Charge. Both played with the Chicago Bandits in 2013.

On the domestic front, Dallas next added Texas native and Texas A&M Aggie infielder/catcher Nicole Morgan. Morgan played for the Pennsylvania Rebellion in 2014. After attending a try out in May 2015, outfielder Brianna Cherry was offered a deal with the team. Cherry was with the Akron Racers in 2014. Kathy Shelton, formerly of Baylor and general manager Kevin Shelton's daughter, was next to sign.

At the 2015 NPF Draft, the Charge drafted several players. In the first round, they selected 3B/C Danielle Henderson (California). She is Jolene's sister. The club then selected utility player Kaitlyn Richardson (Minnesota). In the second round, their only pick was INF/OF Kylee Lahners (Washington). The third round selection was infielder Ashley Burkhardt (Purdue). Dallas was allowed a market pick to select a player from Dallas or who went to a Dallas school. This selection was shortstop Renada Davis (NC State). Round four yielded two picks: SS/2B Kahley Novak (UCF) and RHP/1B Lauren Haeger (Florida). Selected in the fifth round was OF Janie Takeda (Oregon). The sixth and final round had three Dallas picks: RHP/UT Ally Carda (UCLA), OF Kaitlyn Thumann (Baylor), and pitcher Farish Beard (South Alabama). Before opening day, the Charge signed draftees Ashley Burkhardt, Kahley Novak, Kaitlyn Richardson, Danielle Henderson, and Renada Davis. Other free agents who signed with the Charge included Renee Erwin of West Texas A&M, Nadia Taylor of Texas and Akron Racers, and Victoria Valos of George Washington.

The Charge finished their inaugural season in fourth place at 17-31. The Charge then lost in the 2015 NPF Championship semifinals to the USSSA Pride.

2016 season

For the 2016 season, Jennifer Rocha was named head coach succeeding Jennifer McFalls. They ultimately finished in fifth place and missed the playoffs.

2017 season

The Charge moved to San Marcos for the 2017 season and hired three-time Olympian Crystl Bustos to be their head coach. In July, with a 10-11 record, the Charge replaced Crystl Bustos with Roman Foore as head coach. For the second year in a row, they finished in fifth place and missed the playoffs.

In a January 2018 release describing the termination of the Scrap Yard Dawgs' franchise, NPF also indicated that the Charge had been "dismantled after [owner Joel] Bartsch failed to execute an exclusive purchasing option." This was the first official statement by the league about the status of the Charge after the league listed all Charge players as free agents and Justin's World of Softball reported the dissolution of the team in October 2017.

== General managers ==
- Kevin Shelton (2015-2016)
- Scott Smith (2016, 2017)

== All-time head coaches ==
#	Name	Term	Regular season				Playoffs			
#	Name	Term	GC	W	L	W%	GC	W	L	W%
1	Jennifer McFalls	2015	48	17	31	.354	2	0	2	.000
2	Jennifer Rocha	2016	50	20	30	.440	0	0	0	
3	Crystl Bustos	2017	21	10	11	.476	0	0	0	
4	Roman Foore	2017	29	12	17	.308	0	0	0	

== Season-by-season ==
Season records
Season	W	L	T	Finish	Playoff results
2015	17	31	0	4th place National Pro Fastpitch	Lost in NPF Semifinals
2016	20	30	0	5th place National Pro Fastpitch	Did not qualify
2017	22	28	0	5th place National Pro Fastpitch	Did not qualify
Totals	59	89	0		

== Final roster before dissolution ==
Texas Charge roster
Active roster (YYYY = Final season of player contract)		Inactive roster	Coaches
Pitchers: Kelsee Selman-Rowe (2017); 3 Ally Carda (2017); 12 Dallas Escobedo (2018); 13 Delanie Gourley (2018); 16 Jill Compton (2018); 17 Lauren Haeger (2017); 18 Nicole Ries (2017); 27 Emily Vincent (2017); 44 Brittany Mack-Oates (2018)	Catchers: 10 Haley Outon (2017); 15 Mandy Ogle (2017); 23 Kristyn Sandberg (2018); Utility players: 1 Brittany Gomez (2018); 7 Koral Costa (2019); 11 Kylee Lahners (2017); Infielders: 5 Renada Davis (2017); 14 Mysha Sataraka (2018); 33 Missy Taukeiaho (2019); 42 Ruby Rivera (2018); 35 Alisa Goler (2018); 77 Kelsey Stewart (2018); 88 Nadia Taylor (2018); Outfielders: 8 Haylie McCleney (2018); 9 Taylor Gadbois (2018); 20 Brejae Washington (2019); 26 Bailey Landry (2017)	Unsigned Draftees (Year Team's Rights Expire): Alyssa Gillespie (2017); Haley Chambers-Book (2018)	Legend: * Franchise Player Tag; (C) Captain; (A) Alternate captain; → All NPF rosters
