= Meagan May =

American softball player (born 1991)

Personal information
- Born: 1991 (age 34–35) Houston, Texas, U.S.
- Height: 6 ft 0 in (1.83 m)

Sport
- Country: USA
- Sport: Softball
- College team: Texas A&M Aggies
Medal record
Women's softball
Representing United States
Pan American Games
Gold medal – first place	2011 Guadalajara	Team

Meagan May (born 1991) is an American, former collegiate All-American, right-handed hitting retired pro softball player originally from Spring, Texas. She attended Klein Oak High School and later attended Texas A&M University, where she played catcher on the Texas A&M Aggies softball team. She is Texas A&M softball's career leader in home runs. In 2017, her second year, she won a National Pro Fastpitch championship with the Scrap Yard Dawgs.

== Statistics ==
=== Texas A&M Aggies ===
YEAR	G	AB	R	H	BA	RBI	HR	3B	2B	TB	SLG	BB	SO	SB	SBA
2010	60	163	45	66	.405	62	24	0	16	154	.945%	51	32	0	0
2011	48	119	24	37	.311	49	14	1	8	89	.748%	37	38	0	0
2012	59	150	22	44	.293	37	14	0	1	87	.580%	56	26	1	1
2013	50	135	31	36	.266	41	17	0	7	94	.696%	24	23	0	0
TOTALS	217	567	122	183	.323	189	69	1	32	424	.748%	168	119	1	1
