= Jade Rhodes =

American softball player

Jade Rhodes is a former collegiate All-American, right-handed professional All-Star softball player, originally from Sarasota, Florida. Rhodes played for the Auburn Tigers of the Southeastern Conference from 2013 to 2016 as a third baseman and first baseman and ranks in career home runs for the school. She helped the Tigers to a second-place finish at the 2016 Women's College World Series and was named All-Tournament. Although undrafted, Rhodes went on to play in the National Pro Fastpitch from 2016 to 2019 and won a title in 2017 with the Scrap Yard Dawgs.

== High school career ==
In 2012, she was named the Sarasota Herald Tribune Softball Player of the Year for Sarasota High School.

== College career ==
Rhodes was an All-American for the Auburn Tigers.

== Professional career ==
For the 2018 National Pro Fastpitch season, while playing for the Cleveland Comets, Rhodes won the Rawlings Gold Glove Award as the league's top fielder.

== Coaching career ==
Previously an assistant coach at Eastern New Mexico University, Rhodes is now an assistant coach for Oklahoma Baptist University.

== Personal ==
Rhodes's father is former professional baseball player Arthur Rhodes.

== Statistics ==
Auburn Tigers
YEAR	G	AB	R	H	BA	RBI	HR	3B	2B	TB	SLG	BB	SO	SB	SBA
2013	25	24	3	2	.083	2	0	0	0	2	.083%	4	10	2	3
2014	56	156	21	34	.218	45	7	0	8	63	.404%	10	36	0	0
2015	67	183	46	52	.284	58	19	2	6	119	.650%	28	42	0	1
2016	69	195	54	66	.338	74	20	0	11	137	.702%	31	32	2	3
TOTALS	217	558	124	154	.276	179	46	2	25	321	.575%	73	120	4	7
