= Gabe Nesbitt Stadium =

Baseball stadium in Texas, United States

Gabe Nesbitt Stadium at Craig Ranch
- The Gabe
- Interactive map of Gabe Nesbitt Stadium at Craig Ranch
- Location: Craig Ranch McKinney, Texas
- Coordinates: 33.1382°N 96.7052°W
- Capacity: 1,000
- Surface: Natural Grass and Infield dirt

Construction
- Opened: 2005

Tenants
- UIL Baseball Playoffs (2005-Present); Dallas Charge (NPF) (2015–2016)

Gabe Nesbitt Stadium at Craig Ranch is a Baseball stadium located in Dallas Suburb McKinney, Texas. It was built to host playoff games for the University Interscholastic League and became Partial Home to National Pro Fastpitch team Dallas Charge.
