= Lacey Waldrop =

American softball pitcher and coach

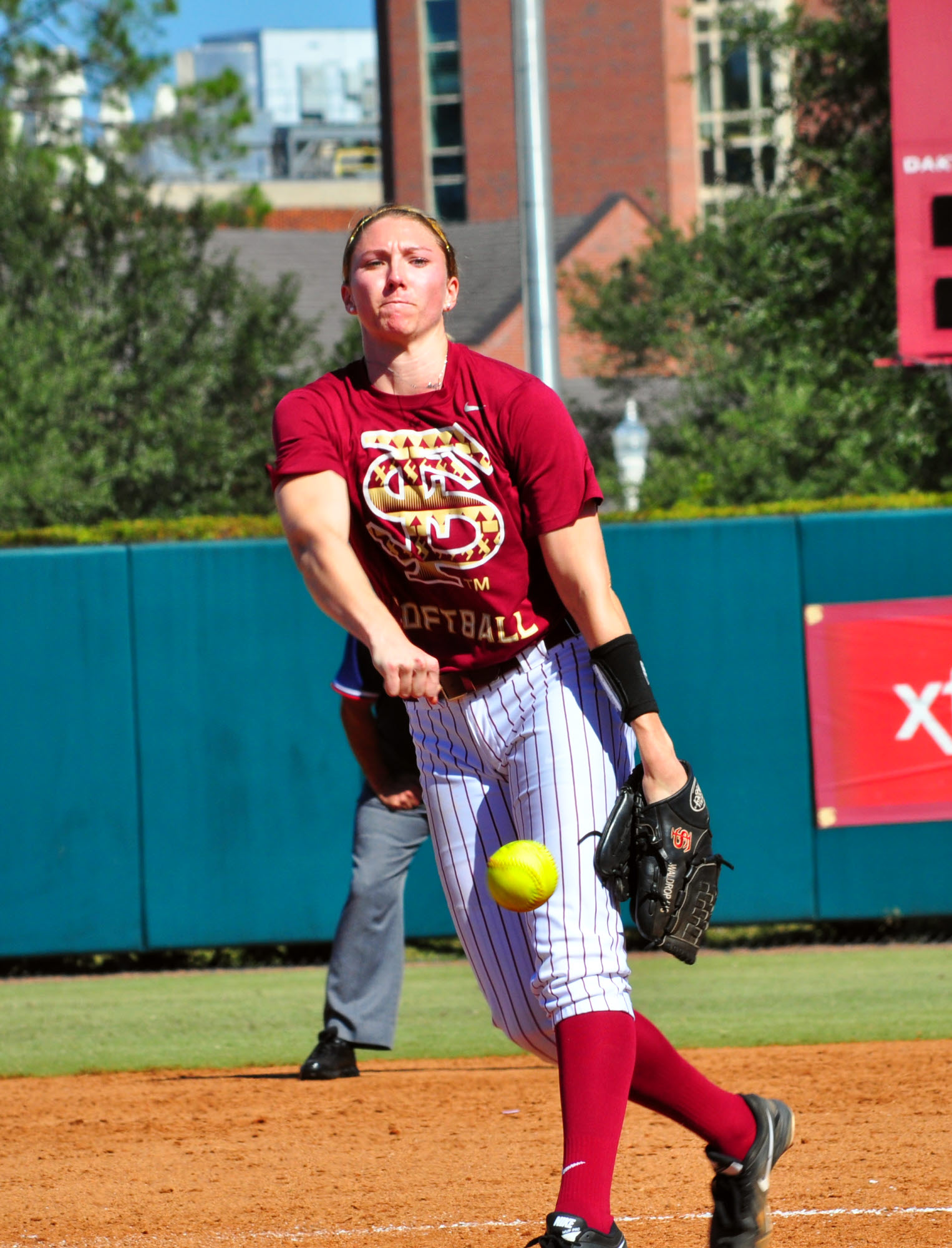
- Waldrop in 2014 as Florida State's Pitcher

Current position
- Title: Assistant coach
- Team: Houston
- Conference: Big 12

Biographical details
- Born: March 6, 1993 (age 33); Chester, Virginia, U.S.
- Education: Florida State University

Playing career
- 2012–2015: Florida State
- 2015–2016: Chicago Bandits
- Position: Pitcher

Coaching career (HC unless noted)
- 2017: Oklahoma (Graduate asst.)
- 2018–2019: Duke (asst.)
- 2019–present: Houston (asst.)

Accomplishments and honors

Championships
- As a Player: 3× ACC regular-season champions (2013-2015); 2× ACC tournament champions (2014, 2015); As an Assistant: Women's College World Series Champions (2017); Big 12 regular-season champions (2017); Big 12 tournament champions (2017)

Awards
- As a Player: USA Softball Collegiate Player of the Year (2014); Senior CLASS Award (2015); First-team All-American (2014); 2× Third-team All-American (2013, 2015); 2× ACC Pitcher of the Year (2014, 2015); 2× ACC All-Tournament Team (2013, 2014); 3× All-ACC First Team (2013–2015); Second-team All-ACC (2012); 2× All-ACC Academic Team (2014, 2015)

Medal record

Women's softball

Representing United States

National Pro Fastpitch
1st	2015 season	Chicago Bandits
1st	2016 season	Chicago Bandits

Lacey Waldrop (born March 6, 1993) is an American, former collegiate All-American professional softball pitcher and current assistant coach at Houston. Waldrop was a starting pitcher for Florida State, where she is the school career leader in wins and was named USA Softball Collegiate Player of the Year in 2014. Waldrop was drafted third overall in the 2015 NPF Draft by the Chicago Bandits, and won two consecutive Cowles Cup championships with the Bandits in 2015 and 2016.

== Playing career ==
Born in Chester, Virginia, she attended Thomas Dale High School, where she made the all-state softball team as a senior in 2011, and was named Player of the Week by the Richmond Times-Dispatch.

Waldrop studied at and played for Florida State University from 2012 to 2015, earning significant recognition, including winning seven All-Atlantic Coast Conference (ACC) honors, three All-American honors, and a tryout invitation for Team USA. In 2014, the Amateur Softball Association and USA Softball named Waldrop the USA Softball Collegiate Player of the Year. She also won ACC Pitcher of the Year in both 2014 and 2015.

Waldrop graduated with a bachelor's degree in Editing, Writing, and Media, with a minor in Communications. During her time at Florida State, she was recognized for her academic achievements.

After graduating, Waldrop was drafted third overall by the Chicago Bandits in the 2015 NPF Draft. She went on to win consecutive Cowles Cup with the Bandits in 2015 and 2016.

== Coaching career ==
On July 6, 2017, Waldrop was named assistant coach at Duke.

On July 17, 2020, Waldrop was named assistant coach at Houston.

== Career statistics ==
Florida State
YEAR	W	L	GP	GS	CG	SHO	SV	IP	H	R	ER	BB	SO	ERA	WHIP
2012	19	5	34	26	10	6	2	162.2	107	44	31	36	139	1.34	0.88
2013	24	10	47	41	17	5	2	219.1	159	76	48	55	259	1.53	0.97
2014	38	7	48	42	27	8	1	266.1	190	70	43	80	287	1.13	1.01
2015	28	7	41	34	21	6	2	211.1	123	64	46	86	232	1.52	0.99
TOTALS	109	29	170	143	75	25	7	859.2	579	254	168	257	917	1.37	0.97
