= Sara Driesenga =

American softball player

Current position
- Title: Assistant Coach
- Team: Central Michigan
- Conference: MAC

Biographical details
- Born: October 12, 1992 (age 34); Hudsonville, Michigan, U.S.

Playing career
- 2012–2016: Michigan
- 2016: Scrap Yard Dawgs
- Position: Pitcher

Coaching career (HC unless noted)
- 2018: Eastern Michigan (volunteer asst.)
- 2019: Central Michigan (asst.)

Accomplishments and honors

Championships
- Women's College World Series runner-up (2015); Big Ten tournament (2015); 4× Big Ten regular season (2012–2016)

Awards
- NFCA first-team Great Lakes All-Region (2016); NFCA second-team Great Lakes All-Region (2012, 2013); 2× first-team All-Big Ten (2012, 2013); Second-team All-Big Ten (2016)

Sara Lynn Driesenga (born October 12, 1992) is an American softball coach and former pitcher. She is currently an assistant coach at Central Michigan. Playing college softball at Michigan, she compiled a 31-9 record during the 2013 season with 247 strikeouts and a 1.89 ERA. She threw a no-hitter against Hofstra in February 2013 and pitched a complete-game shutout against Arizona State in the 2013 Women's College World Series.

== Early years ==
Driesenga was born in 1992 and grew up in Hudsonville, Michigan. She was named Miss Softball in the State of Michigan in 2011. She also won the Gatorade Michigan Softball Player of the Year award three times while in high school.

== College career ==
Driesenga enrolled at the University of Michigan in the fall of 2011. As a freshman in the spring of 2012, Driesenga was selected as a first-team All-Big Ten Conference player. She started 42 games for the Wolverines at pitcher or designated hitter. As a pitcher, she compiled a 9-10 record with a 2.53 earned run average (ERA). As a batter, she reached base in 32 consecutive games from March 21 to May 24, 2012. On April 6, 2012, she hit two home runs against Ohio State.

As a sophomore in 2013, Driesenga set a Michigan record with 54 appearances and tied the school record with 41 starts at pitcher. She compiled a 31-9 record with 247 strikeouts and a 1.89 ERA. On March 1, 2013, she struck out a career high 15 batters against Georgia Tech. On February 23, 2013, she threw a no-hitter against Hofstra. On June 1, 2013, she pitched a complete-game shutout against Arizona State in the Women's College World Series.

In 2014, Driesenga appeared in 28 games, 15 as a starter, and compiled a 5-6 record with a 2.34 ERA and 75 strikeouts.

In 2015, through games of May 3, 2015, Driesenga had appeared in 7 games, 4 as a starter, and had compiled a 4-0 record with a 0.78 ERA and 20 strikeouts.

Granted a medical redshirt for 2015, Driesenga returned to Michigan for her final year of eligibility in 2016 as a graduate student after completing her bachelor's degree in psychology in April 2015. Earning second-team All-Big Ten and NFCA first-team Great Lakes All-Region honors, Driesenga went 22–1 on the season with a 2.13 ERA and 95 strikeouts.

== Professional career ==
Drafted number 27 overall in the 2016 National Pro Fastpitch draft by the Scrap Yard Dawgs, Driesenga played one season with the a Houston-based team and finished with a 1–4 record and 3.48 ERA.

== Coaching career ==
Driesenga completed her MSW at Michigan in spring 2017.

=== Eastern Michigan (asst.) ===
On December 19, 2017, Driesenga became a volunteer assistant coach with Eastern Michigan University in what turned out to be the softball program's final year of existence, as Eastern Michigan announced in March 2018 that it decided to drop softball for budgetary reasons.

=== Central Michigan (asst.) ===
On August 9, 2019, Driesenga was named an assistant coach of the Central Michigan softball program.
