= Ellen Renfroe =

American softball player

Ellen Renfroe Reed
Personal information
- Full name: Ellen Ruth Renfroe
- Born: April 25, 1992 (age 34) Jackson, Tennessee, U.S.
- Height: 6 ft 0 in (183 cm)
- Spouse: Jon Reed

Sport
- Sport: Softball
- College team: Tennessee Lady Volunteers

Ellen Ruth Reed née Renfroe (born April 25, 1992) is an American former college softball All-American pitcher at Tennessee.

== Playing career ==
Renfroe played for the Tennessee Lady Volunteers from 2011 to 2014. Following her freshman season she was named SEC Freshman of the Year. Renfroe was the second of three softball playing sisters at Tennessee; she is the sister of Anna and Ivy Renfroe. Renfroe was also an All-Southeastern Conference player for four years. Renfroe was also on the 2013 Women's College World Series All-Tournament team, helping the Lady Vols finish as National runner up in the 2013 Women's College World Series. Renfroe is currently a high school softball coach.

== Personal ==
Ellen spent two years as an assistant coach for the University of Memphis. She also spent one year as the head coach of Bethel University in 2017. She was an assistant coach of the University of Louisiana at Lafayette, working primarily with the pitching staff.

== Career statistics ==
YEAR	W	L	GP	GS	CG	SHO	SV	IP	H	R	ER	BB	SO	ERA	WHIP
2011	26	7	45	27	17	7	1	201.0	142	52	43	66	259	1.49	1.03
2012	27	5	47	36	23	15	4	231.0	145	47	41	76	280	1.24	0.95
2013	19	5	38	29	14	7	3	200.2	135	59	53	72	221	1.85	1.03
2014	30	8	45	37	30	12	4	239.1	179	85	69	71	245	2.02	1.04
TOTALS	102	25	175	129	84	41	12	872.0	601	243	206	285	1005	1.65	1.01
