= Jennifer Rocha =

American softball coach

Current position
- Title: Associate head coach
- Team: Oklahoma
- Conference: SEC

Biographical details
- Education: Oklahoma (Class of 1998)

Playing career
- 1995: Long Beach City College
- 1996–1998: Oklahoma
- Position: Pitcher

Coaching career (HC unless noted)
- 1999–2001: Oklahoma (Graduate asst.)
- 2002: Oregon (asst.)
- 2003–2005: Wichita State (asst.)
- 2006–2017: Florida (asst.)
- 2018: Florida (Associate HC)
- 2019–present: Oklahoma (Associate HC)

Accomplishments and honors

Awards
- As an Assistant: NFCA Assistant Coach of the Year (2015, 2023)

Jennifer Jaime Rocha is an American, former collegiate right-handed softball pitcher and coach. She is the current associate head coach at Oklahoma where she was a starting pitcher from 1996 to 1998. Jennifer attended St Pius X High School in Downey, California where she graduated in 1994.

== Coaching career ==
=== Florida (asst.) ===
Rocha began coaching at Florida as an assistant coach in 2006. Prior to the 2018 season, Rocha was promoted to the level of associate head coach of the Florida softball program.

=== Oklahoma (asst.) ===
On July 18, 2018, Jennifer Rocha was announced as the new associate head coach and pitching coach of the Oklahoma softball program, replacing Melyssa Lombardi who left to be the head coach of Oregon.

== Personal life ==
Rocha was married in 2006 to her husband Paul Rocha. They have one daughter named Eliana.

== Statistics ==
Oklahoma Sooners
YEAR	W	L	GP	GS	CG	SHO	SV	IP	H	R	ER	BB	SO	ERA	WHIP
1996	16	7	30	20	13	6	1	139.0	125	48	38	38	68	1.91	1.17
1997	12	6	32	21	13	9	0	137.1	102	41	28	43	91	1.43	1.06
1998	16	4	26	23	16	6	1	142.2	111	44	28	39	92	1.38	1.05
TOTALS	44	17	88	64	42	21	2	419.0	338	133	94	120	251	1.57	1.09
