= Britt Vonk =

Dutch softball player (born 1991)

Algodoneros de Unión Laguna – No. 18
- Infielder
- Born: 11 April 1991 (age 34); Enschede, Overijssel, Netherlands
- Bats: Left Throws: Right

NPF debut
- Scrap YardDawgs

Teams
- Scrap Yard Dawgs (2017); Algodoneros de Unión Laguna (2025–present)

Career highlights and awards
- NPF Champion (2017)

Britt Vonk (born 11 April 1991) is a Dutch softball player for the Algodoneros de Unión Laguna of the Mexican Softball League. She has represented the Dutch national team in international competitions. She attended and played for the University of California, Berkeley.

Since 2005 Vonk has played for the Tex Town Tigers, her hometown club team. She is a shortstop, first baseman, and second baseman who bats left-handed and throws right-handed. She has competed for the Dutch national team since 2008. She was the best batter at the 2008 J.C.J. Mastenbroek Tournament. She was part of the Dutch team for the 2008 Summer Olympics in Beijing, the team's youngest player at 17 years old.

In 2010 she arrived at Cal as a freshman, immediately distinguishing herself by leading the team in both batting average and on-base percentage. She majored in Psychology.

She was signed by the Algodoneros de Unión Laguna of the Mexican Softball League for the 2025 season.
