= Ivy Renfroe =

American softball player

Personal information
- Full name: Ivy Leigh Renfroe
- Nationality: American
- Born: February 16, 1991 (age 35) Jackson, Tennessee
- Height: 6 ft 0 in (183 cm)

Sport
- College team: Tennessee Lady Volunteers

Ivy Leigh Renfroe (born February 16, 1991) is an American softball player. Renfroe is the oldest of three softball playing sisters, all enrolled with Tennessee. Renfroe was a pitcher for the Tennessee Lady Volunteers from 2010 to 2013. Renfroe earned a Women's College World Series All-Tournament team honors in 2010. Renfroe also earned an All-SEC honor all four years of her career.

== Early life ==
Renfroe was born on February 16, 1991, in Jackson, Tennessee. Renfroe is a 2009 graduate of Trinity Christian Academy. Her siblings are Ellen Renfroe and Anna Renfroe. She is the daughter of Marty and Emily Renfroe.

== 2010 – 2011 (Tennessee) ==
As a freshman at the University of Tennessee, Renfroe recorded a 31–6 record as the team's ace. Just the second pitcher in school history to have 30+ wins, including a win at the women's college world series (Monica Abbott). Renfroe was an All-SEC performer (2nd Team), as well as an All-SEC freshman performer. She was named to the All-Southeast region team as well. Renfroe was also named to the Women's College World Series All-Tournament team with a 2–2 record in the tournament. In 2011, as a sophomore, Renfroe continued her excellent performance in the circle, recording a 19–4 record, as she shared the ace position with her sister Ellen. She was named an All-SEC preseason member. She was also on the Top 50 USA Softball Player of the Year Watchlist.

== 2012 – 2013 (Tennessee) ==
During Renfroe's Junior year in 2012, she continued to be successful. She had a 25–9 record in her Junior campaign and helped the team to a Women's College World Series appearance. Although the Lady Vols were sent home in consecutive games, Renfroe still had an excellent season. In addition to her 25 wins, Renfroe was named to the SEC spring Academic Honor Roll. Renfroe entered her Senior year in 2013 with high hopes, and pitched to the expectations. Renfroe ended her career with a strong campaign, recording a 22–5 record. An All-SEC performer, Renfroe started 21 games, the least over her career, however threw in 20 games in relief, as she prefers. Renfroe helped the Lady Vols finish runner-up in the Women's College World Series, with a 1–1 record, including a win over Texas in the Semifinals to move Tennessee into the championship series against the Oklahoma Sooners.

== Career statistics ==
=== Tennessee Lady Vols ===
Year	W	L	GP	GS	CG	Sh	SV	IP	H	R	ER	BB	SO	ERA
2010	31	6	56	39	15	6	5	232.1	202	94	80	79	235	2.41
2011	19	4	37	25	11	7	3	152.1	119	57	45	61	157	2.07
2012	25	9	42	30	17	9	3	214.1	146	59	55	50	197	1.80
2013	22	5	41	21	12	6	1	150.2	111	47	38	50	148	1.07
