= Jailyn Ford =

American softball player (born 1994)

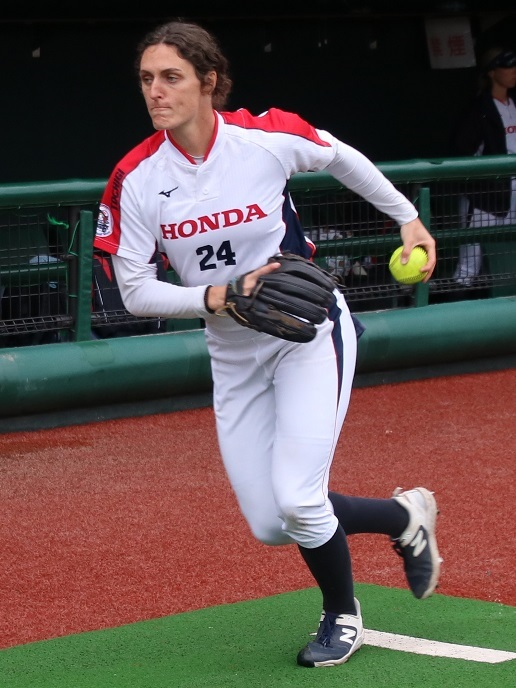

Oklahoma City Spar
- Pitcher
- Born: June 3, 1994 (age 31); Hot Springs, Virginia, U.S.
- Bats: Right Throws: Left

NPF debut
- June 8, 2016, for the Akron Racers

NPF statistics
- Win–loss record: 9-10
- Earned run average: 3.87
- Strikeouts: 76
- Saves: 2

Teams
- James Madison Dukes (2013–2017); Akron Racers (2016–2017); Honda Reverta (2017); USSSA Pride (2018–2019); Oklahoma City Spark (2026–present)
Medals
Women's softball
Representing United States
World Games
Gold medal – first place	2022 Birmingham	Team

Jailyn Sue Ford (born June 3, 1994) is an American professional softball pitcher and first basemen for the Oklahoma City Spark of the Athletes Unlimited Softball League (AUSL). She played college softball at James Madison and professionally for the Akron Racers and USSSA Pride of the National Pro Fastpitch.

== Playing career ==
Ford played college softball for James Madison from 2013 to 2016 where she was part of the winningest Senior Class in James Madison history, where she also started every game of her college career, either at first base or pitcher. During Ford's time at James Madison, the Dukes won three CAA Regular Season Titles (2013, 2015, 2016), as well as a Tournament Title (2016).

She was drafted third overall by the Akron Racers and later played for USSSA Pride of National Pro Fastpitch, winning back-to-back titles in 2018 and 2019, being named MVP for the latter series.

On December 1, 2025, she was drafted in the third round, 14th overall, by the Oklahoma City Spark in the AUSL allocation draft.

== Career statistics ==
James Madison Dukes
YEAR	W	L	GP	GS	CG	SHO	SV	IP	H	R	ER	BB	SO	ERA	WHIP
2013	24	6	33	31	23	9	1	191.0	122	54	44	66	209	1.61	0.98
2014	24	7	41	31	21	9	4	228.2	166	49	41	40	233	1.26	0.90
2015	16	5	32	22	12	6	3	136.2	80	49	45	27	192	2.31	0.78
2016	18	3	30	23	14	7	1	150.0	85	32	22	42	181	1.02	0.84
TOTALS	82	21	136	107	70	31	9	706.1	453	184	152	175	815	1.50	0.89

James Madison Dukes
YEAR	G	AB	R	H	BA	RBI	HR	3B	2B	TB	SLG	BB	SO	SB	SBA
2013	59	169	38	63	.373	49	15	1	11	121	.716%	15	39	9	14
2014	60	164	36	44	.268	29	9	0	9	80	.488%	34	38	9	13
2015	58	162	44	62	.382	44	11	5	9	114	.703%	32	28	9	13
2016	56	145	40	47	.324	33	11	3	10	90	.620%	49	22	17	21
TOTALS	233	640	158	216	.337	155	46	9	39	411	.642%	130	127	44	61

Akron Racers
Year	W	L	GP	GS	CG	Sh	SV	IP	H	R	ER	BB	SO	ERA
2016	9	10	43	18	6	2	2	100.1	98	61	55	34	75	3.87
