= AJ Andrews =

American softball player (born 1993)

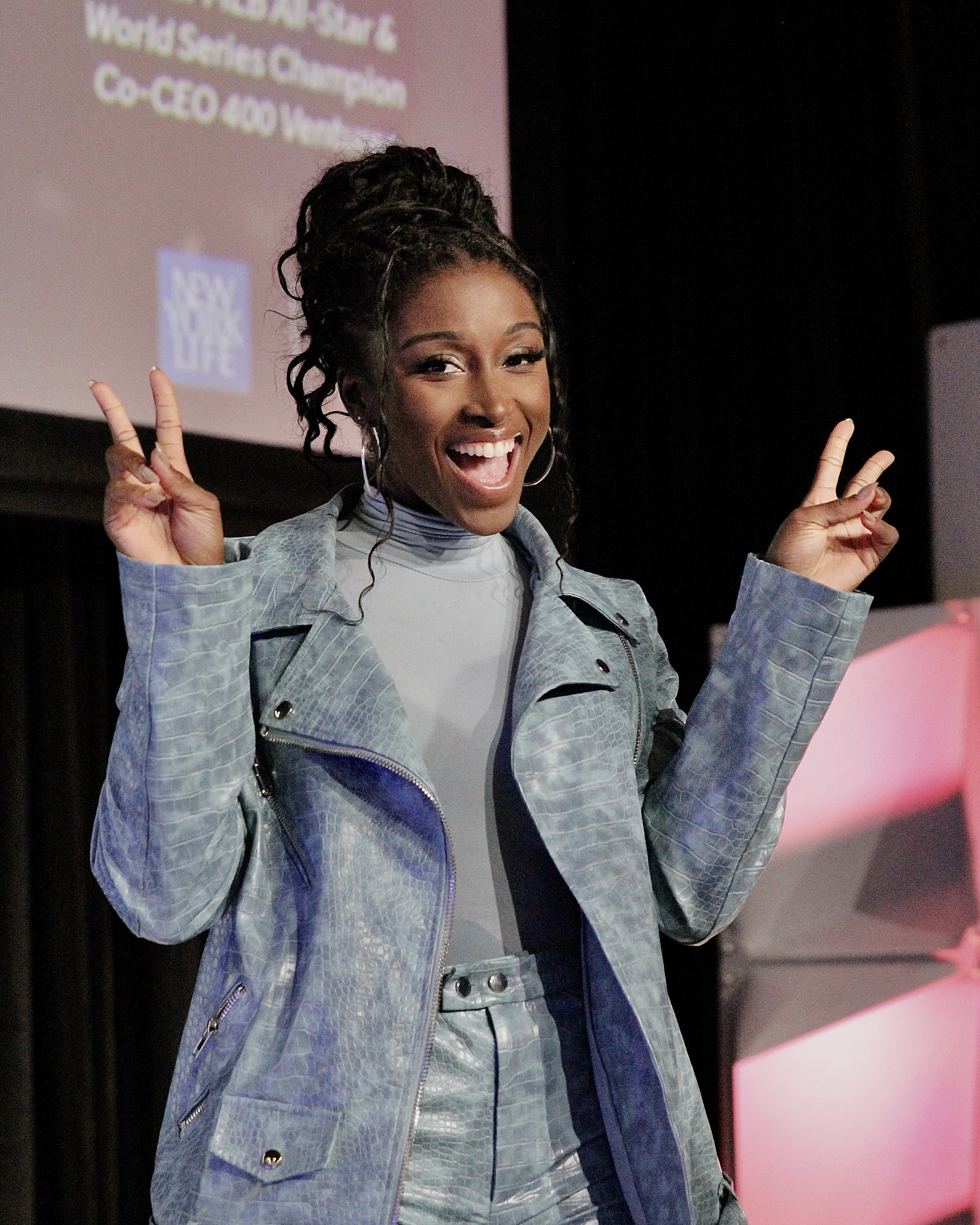
- Andrews at SXSW 2025

Akron Racers
- Outfielder
- Born: June 7, 1993 (age 33); Oldsmar, Florida, U.S.

Teams
- LSU (2012–2015); Chicago Bandits (2015); Akron Racers (2016)

Career highlights and awards
- Gold Glove Award (2016)

Ayanna Jeanene Andrews (born June 7, 1993) is an American former professional softball player with the now defunct Akron Racers of National Pro Fastpitch. In 2016, she became the first woman to win a Gold Glove Award.

She is also the current host of the Saturday morning MLB Network show Play Ball.

== Amateur career ==
Playing for Countryside High School in Clearwater, Florida, Andrews was named Pinellas County player of the year. She led the state in stolen bases and batting average as a senior.

Andrews played college softball for the LSU Lady Tigers. Twice she participated in the Women's College World Series. She graduated from LSU in 2015.

== Professional career ==
Andrews was selected by the Chicago Bandits of National Pro Fastpitch (NPF) in the second round of the 2015 NPF Draft. After the 2015 season, she was traded to the Akron Racers.

In 2016, Andrews became the first woman to win a Rawlings Gold Glove Award. She was also a co-winner of the Rally Spike Award as the league's stolen base leader. In 2017, she was featured in the Body Issue of ESPN The Magazine.
