= Emily Crane =

American softball player (born 1994)

Personal information
- Born: February 22, 1994 (age 32) St. Louis, Missouri, U.S.
- Height: 5 ft 6 in (1.68 m)

Sport
- Country: USA
- Sport: Softball
- College team: Missouri Tigers

Emily Crane (born February 22, 1994) is an American softball player. She attended Troy Buchanan High School in Troy, Missouri. She later attended the University of Missouri, where she was an All-American for the Missouri Tigers softball team. She later went on to play professional softball with the Chicago Bandits of National Pro Fastpitch.
