= Rachel Fox (softball) =

American softball coach

Current position
- Title: Assistant coach
- Team: Samford
- Conference: SoCon

Biographical details
- Born: 1991 (age 34–35); Sugar Land, Texas, U.S.
- Education: Texas A&M University

Playing career
- 2011–2012: Texas
- 2014–2015: Texas A&M
- 2016–2017: Scrap Yard Dawgs
- Position: Pitcher

Coaching career (HC unless noted)
- 2016–2017: Mississippi State (GA)
- 2018: Incarnate Word (pitching coach)
- 2019–present: Samford (assistant)

Rachel Fox (born 1991) is an American softball coach and former player. She is currently the assistant coach at Samford.

== Career ==
She attended Fort Bend Christian Academy in Sugar Land, Texas, graduating in 2010. Fox later attended the University of Texas at Austin for two years, before transferring to Texas A&M University. At both universities, she pitched on the school's respective college softball teams. After graduating from Texas A&M, Fox played professional softball with the Scrap Yard Dawgs of National Pro Fastpitch, while serving as a graduate assistant softball coach at Mississippi State University from 2016 to 2017.

== Coaching career ==
She later served as the pitching coach at the University of the Incarnate Word in 2018. On August 8, 2018, Fox was named an assistant softball coach at Samford University.
