= Scrap Yard Fast Pitch =

Women's professional softball team

- Logo

Information
- League: National Pro Fastpitch (2016–2017); Independent (2018–2020)
- Location: Conroe, Texas
- Ballpark: Scrapyard Softball Complex
- Founded: 2015
- Folded: 2020
- League championships: 1 (2017)
- General manager: Connie May
- Website: scrapyardsports.com scrapyardfastpitch.com

The Scrap Yard Fast Pitch was an independent women's professional softball team based in Conroe, Texas, just north of Houston. Established in October 2015 as the Scrap Yard Dawgs, the team played in the National Pro Fastpitch (NPF) during the 2016 and 2017 seasons. The Dawgs were the first NPF team to be based in the Houston area since the Texas Thunder became the Rockford Thunder in the 2007 season. In 2017, the Dawgs won their first NPF title against Pride in the best of three game series.

After having its franchise terminated by the NPF, the team went independent under the name Scrap Yard Fast Pitch.

In June 2020, all eighteen of the team's players quit in protest of a tweet by the franchise owner. Days later, the team became "This Is Us" and continued their series against the USSSA Pride.

Although the team has since disbanded, the facilities are still maintained by Scrap Yard Sports, which also runs recreational softball and baseball leagues.

== History ==
On October 23, 2015, NPF announced the Scrap Yards Dawgs as an expansion team for the 2016 season. Kevin Shelton, also the general manager of the Dallas Charge, was introduced as the Dawgs' GM.

On May 5, 2016, the Dawgs signed free agent Monica Abbott to a six-year contract, believed to be worth $1 million; the contract was believed to be the most lucrative paid by an individual American professional franchise to an active female athlete in any team sport.

=== 2017 ===
For the 2017 season, the Dawgs hired Texas A&M associate head coach Gerry Glasco as their head coach. Glasco's assistants would be Oregon's Jimmy Kolaitis and Joe Guthrie of Bucknell. Glasco was head coach of the USSSA Pride in 2014. Kolaitis was an assistant coach for the Chicago Bandits in 2013. The Dawgs finished second during the regular season and won the 2017 Cowles Cup Championship.

=== 2018 ===
On January 28, the Dawgs announced via press release they would no longer be affiliated with the NPF. The NPF terminated their franchise on January 29 citing that the team had violated several league operating rules and franchise requirements. The team indicated they would continue as an independent team under the name Scrap Yard Fastpitch.

=== 2020 ===
In June 2020, during the George Floyd protests and after the first game of a planned seven-game series, franchise owner Connie May tweeted a photo of players standing with hands on heart captioned "Everyone respecting the flag," a reference to the U.S. national anthem protests. May tagged President and protest critic Donald Trump in the tweet. All eighteen players quit the team. The players vowed to never play for Scrap Yard again and formed a new team tentatively named This Is Us. Scrapping together donated uniforms, the players returned to the field days later, defeating the USSSA Pride. Coach Michael Steuerwald and several former Scrap Yard staffers remained with the new team.

== Team ==
=== General managers ===
- Kevin Shelton (2015)
- Connie May (2016–2020)

=== Current roster ===
Scrap Yard Dawgs roster
Active roster (YYYY = Final season of player contract)		Inactive roster	Coaches
Pitchers: 8 Rachel Fox (2017); 14 Monica Abbott (2021); 20 Morgan Foley (2018); 21 Morgan Melloh (2017); 49 Miranda Kramer (2018); 77 Cheridan Hawkins (2018)	Catchers: 13 Meagan May-Whitley (2017); 25 Taylor Edwards (2021); Infielders: 1 Hannah Flippen (2018); 4 Olivia Watkins (2018); 9 Kayla Winkfield (2018); 11 Ali Aguilar (2021); 15 Nerissa Myers (2017); 17 Anissa Urtez (2018); 18 Britt Vonk (Kingdom of the Netherlands) (2017); 23 Christian Stokes (2018); 31 Kasey Cooper (2018); 34 Katiyana Mauga (2018); 47 Amanda Kamekona (2018); 99 MJ Knighten (2019); Outfielders: 6 Kiki Stokes (2018); 22 Brittany Cervantes (2021); 28 Morgan Zerkle (2018); 36 Emilee Koerner (2018); 43 Allexis Bennett (2018); 44 Brianna Cherry (2018)	Unsigned Draftees (Year Team's Rights Expire): Nikki Udria (2018)	Head Coach: Gerry Glasco; Assistant Coaches: Jimmy Kolaitis; Joe Guthrie; Legend: * Franchise Player Tag; (C) Captain; (A) Alternate captain; → All NPF rosters

=== All-time head coaches ===
#	Name	Term	Regular season				Playoffs			
#	Name	Term	GC	W	L	W%	GC	W	L	W%
1	Javier Vela, Tripp MacKay	2016	48	29	19	.604	3	1	2	.333
2	Gerry Glasco	2017	49	31	18	.633	5	4	1	.800

== Season-by-season ==
Season records
Season	W	L	T	Finish	Playoff results
2016	29	19	0	2nd place National Pro Fastpitch	Lost to Chicago Bandits 2-games-to-1 in NPF Semifinals
2017	31	18	0	2nd place National Pro Fastpitch	Won NPF Championship 2-games-to-1 over USSSA Pride, Defeated Akron Racers 2-games-to-0 in NPF Semifinals
Totals	60	37	0		

== Draft history ==
=== NPF Draft ===
Achievements
Preceded by Chicago Bandits; 2016	Cowles Cup NPF Champions; Scrap Yard Dawgs; 2017	Succeeded by incumbent
