= 2015 NPF transactions =

The following is a list 2015 NPF transactions that have occurred in the National Pro Fastpitch softball league since the completion of the 2014 season and during the 2015 season. It lists which team each player has been traded to, signed by, or claimed by, and for which player(s) or draft pick (s), if applicable. Players who have retired are also listed.

== Transactions ==
Source:Any transactions listed below without a reference were originally announced on NPF's transactions page

| Date | Player | Team | Type | Details/Ref |
|---|---|---|---|---|
| 7/23/2015 | Alex Booker | Chicago Bandits | Release | Alex Booker released from Bandits |
| 7/20/2015 | Kailee Cuico | Chicago Bandits | Signing | Kailee Cuico (Oregon) signs with Bandits |
| 7/12/2015 | Hallie Wilson | USSSA Florida Pride | Signing | Hallie Wilson (Arizona) signs with Pride - 2-year deal |
| 7/09/2015 | Miranda Kramer | Pennsylvania Rebellion | Signing | Miranda Kramer (Western Kentucky) signs with Rebellion - 2-year deal |
| 7/09/2015 | Yuri Masuyama | Pennsylvania Rebellion | Release | Yuri Masuyama released from Rebellion |
| 7/08/2015 | Kailee Cuico | Akron Racers | Release | Kailee Cuico released from Racers |
| 6/28/2015 | Kylee Lahners | Dallas Charge | Signing | Kylee Lahners (Washington) signs with Charge - 2-year deal |
| 6/27/2015 | Briana Hamilton | Akron Racers | Signing | Briana Hamilton signs with Racers |
| 6/26/2015 | Rachele Fico | Akron Racers | Signing | Rachele Fico re-signs with Racers |
| 6/23/2015 | Bailey Watts | Dallas Charge | Release | Bailey Watts released from Charge |
| 6/16/2015 | Haylie Wagner | Pennsylvania Rebellion | Signing | Haylie Wagner (Michigan) signs with Rebellion - 2-year deal |
| 6/16/2015 | Briana Hamilton | Pennsylvania Rebellion | Release | Briana Hamilton released from Rebellion |
| 6/16/2015 | Branndi Melero | Chicago Bandits | Signing | Branndi Melero (Auburn) signs with Bandits |
| 6/13/2015 | Kaylyn Castillo | Dallas Charge | Signing | Kaylyn Castillo re-signs with Charge |
| 6/12/2015 | AJ Andrews | Chicago Bandits | Signing | AJ Andrews (LSU) signs with Bandits |
| 6/11/2015 | Nicole Morgan | Dallas Charge | Trade | Nicole Morgan traded from Rebellion to Charge in exchange for Charge's 2016 6th Round Draft Pick and Charge's 2017 3rd Round Draft Pick |
| 6/10/2015 | Nicole Morgan | Pennsylvania Rebellion | Signing | Nicole Morgan's Player Contract Re-instated to Rebellion |
| 6/9/2015 | Lauren Haeger | Dallas Charge | Signing | Lauren Haeger (Florida) signs with Charge - 3-year deal |
| 6/9/2015 | Virginie Anneveld | Pennsylvania Rebellion | Signing | Virginie Anneveld (Netherlands) signs with Rebellion - 2-year deal |
| 6/9/2015 | Dagmar Bloeming | Pennsylvania Rebellion | Signing | Dagmar Bloeming (Netherlands) signs with Rebellion - 2-year deal |
| 6/9/2015 | Natalie Villarreal | Dallas Charge | Release | Natalie Villarreal released from Charge |
| 6/9/2015 | Renee Erwin | Dallas Charge | Release | Renee Erwin released from Charge |
| 6/8/2015 | Emily Weiman | Pennsylvania Rebellion | Signing | Emily Weiman (NC State) signs with Rebellion - 2-year deal |
| 6/8/2015 | Maddie O'Brien | Pennsylvania Rebellion | Signing | Maddie O'Brien (FSU) signs with Rebellion - 2-year deal |
| 6/8/2015 | Bryana Walker | Pennsylvania Rebellion | Release | Bryana Walker released from Rebellion |
| 6/8/2015 | Amber Parrish | Pennsylvania Rebellion | Release | Amber Parrish released from Rebellion |
| 6/8/2015 | Ashley Carter | Pennsylvania Rebellion | Release | Ashley Carter released from Rebellion |
| 6/8/2015 | Angel Bunner | Pennsylvania Rebellion | Release | Angel Bunner released from Rebellion |
| 6/7/2015 | Kathy Shelton | Dallas Charge | Release | Kathy Shelton released from Charge |
| 6/5/2015 | Cassie Tysarczyk | Akron Racers | Signing | Free Agent Cassie Tysarczyk signs with Racers |
| 6/4/2015 | Lauren Chamberlain | USSSA Florida Pride | Signing | Lauren Chamberlain (Oklahoma) signs with Pride - 3-year deal |
| 6/3/2015 | Cassie Tysarczyk | USSSA Florida Pride | Release | Cassie Tysarczyk released from Pride |
| 6/2/2015 | Jessica Shults | USSSA Florida Pride | Release | Jessica Shults released from Pride |
| 6/2/2015 | Renada Davis | Dallas Charge | Signing | Renada Davis (NC State) signs with Charge - 2-year deal |
| 6/1/2015 | Victoria Valos | Dallas Charge | Signing | Victoria Valos (George Washington) signs with Charge |
| 6/1/2015 | Nadia Taylor | Dallas Charge | Signing | Nadia Taylor (Texas) signs with Charge - 2-year deal |
| 6/1/2015 | Renee Erwin | Dallas Charge | Signing | Renee Erwin (West Texas A&M) signs with Charge |
| 5/29/2015 | Kaylyn Castillo | Dallas Charge | Release | Kaylyn Castillo released from Charge |
| 5/29/2015 | Lisa Norris | Akron Racers | Signing | Lisa Norris re-signs with Racers |
| 5/29/2015 | Whitney Arion | Pennsylvania Rebellion | Signing | Whitney Arion (Louisville) signs with Rebellion |
| 5/29/2015 | Allyson Fournier | Pennsylvania Rebellion | Signing | Allyson Fournier (Tufts) signs with Rebellion |
| 5/29/2015 | Dagmar Bloeming | Pennsylvania Rebellion | Release | Rebellion release Dagmar Bloeming |
| 5/29/2015 | Virginie Anneveld | Pennsylvania Rebellion | Release | Rebellion release Virginie Anneveld |
| 5/29/2015 | Amber Parrish | Pennsylvania Rebellion | Signing | Amber Parrish (North Carolina) signs with Rebellion - 2-year deal |
| 5/29/2015 | Emma Johnson | Pennsylvania Rebellion | Signing | Emma Johnson (Kent State) signs with Rebellion - 2-year deal |
| 5/29/2015 | Cheyenne Cordes | Pennsylvania Rebellion | Signing | Cheyenne Cordes (California) signs with Rebellion - 2-year deal |
| 5/28/2015 | Kaitlyn Richardson | Dallas Charge | Signing | Kaitlyn Richardson (Minnesota) signs with Charge - 2-year deal |
| 5/28/2015 | Shelby Pendley | USSSA Florida Pride | Signing | Shelby Pendley (Oklahoma) signs with Pride - 3-year deal |
| 5/28/2015 | Lacey Waldrop | Chicago Bandits | Signing | Lacey Waldrop (Florida State) signs with Bandits |
| 5/27/2015 | Kelsi Jones | Chicago Bandits | Signing | Kelsi Jones (Louisville) signs with Bandits |
| 5/27/2015 | Danielle Henderson | Dallas Charge | Signing | Danielle Henderson (California) signs with Charge - 2-year deal |
| 5/27/2015 | Chelsea Goodacre | USSSA Florida Pride | Signing | Chelsea Goodacre (Arizona) signs with Pride |
| 5/27/2015 | Vicky Galasso | Chicago Bandits | Signing | Vicky Galasso (Idaho State) signs with Bandits |
| 5/27/2015 | Anna Miller | Pennsylvania Rebellion | Release | Rebellion release Pitcher Anna Miller |
| 5/27/2015 | BB Bates | Pennsylvania Rebellion | Release | Rebellion release Outfielder BB Bates |
| 5/26/2015 | Griffin Joiner | Akron Racers | Signing | Griffin Joiner (Kentucky) signs with Racers |
| 5/25/2015 | Brenna Moss | Chicago Bandits | Signing | Brenna Moss (Fresno State) signs with Bandits |
| 5/25/2015 | Megan Blank | Chicago Bandits | Signing | Megan Blank (Iowa) signs with Bandits |
| 5/24/2015 | Emilee Koerner | USSSA Florida Pride | Signing | Emilee Koerner (Notre Dame) signs with Pride - 2-year deal |
| 5/24/2015 | Amber Freeman | USSSA Florida Pride | Signing | Amber Freeman (Arizona State) signs with Pride |
| 5/22/2015 | Shellie Robinson | Akron Racers | Signing | Shellie Robinson (USC Upstate) signs with Racers |
| 5/21/2015 | Sammy Marshall | Chicago Bandits | Signing | Sammy Marshall (Western Illinois) signs with Bandits |
| 5/20/2015 | Kahley Novak | Dallas Charge | Signing | Kahley Novak (Central Florida) signs with Charge - 2-year deal |
| 5/20/2015 | Ashley Burkhardt | Dallas Charge | Signing | Ashley Burkhardt (Purdue) signs with Charge - 2-year deal |
| 5/15/2015 | Megan Low | Akron Racers | Signing | Megan Low (Texas-San Anotonio) signs with Racers |
| 5/13/2015 | Brianna Cherry | Dallas Charge | Signing | Free Agent Brianna Cherry signs with Charge - 2-year deal |
| 5/13/2015 | Kathy Shelton | Dallas Charge | Signing | Kathy Shelton (Baylor) signs with Charge |
| 5/13/2015 | Nicole Morgan | Dallas Charge | Signing | Free Agent Nicole Morgan signs with Charge |
| 4/14/2015 | Monica Abbott | Chicago Bandits | Signing | Monica Abbott re-signs with Bandits |
| 4/12/2015 | Kazuki Watanabe | Dallas Charge | Signing | Kazuki Watanabe (Japan) signs with Charge |
| 4/6/2015 | Eri Yamada | Dallas Charge | Signing | Eri Yamada (Japan) signs with Charge |
| 3/25/2015 | Haruna Sakamoto | Pennsylvania Rebellion | Signing | Haruna Sakamoto (Japan) signs with Rebellion |
| 3/24/2015 | Vanessa Stokes | Dallas Charge | Signing | Vanessa Stokes (Australia) signs with Charge |
| 3/18/2015 | | | Trade | USSSA Florida Pride has traded the 2015 4th overall draft pick (4th pick in the first round) in exchange for the Dallas Charge 2016 first draft pick in the first round |
| 3/16/2015 | Lauren Lappin | Pennsylvania Rebellion | Retirement | Lauren Lappin Announces Retirement |
| 3/13/2015 | Sarah Purvis | Dallas Charge | Signing | Sarah Purvis signs with Charge |
| 3/13/2015 | Sonoka Kuniyoshi | Akron Racers | Signing | Sonoka Kuniyoshi (Japan) signs with Racers |
| 3/13/2015 | Ayumi Karino | Akron Racers | Signing | Free Agent Ayumi Karino re-signs with Racers |
| 3/3/2015 | Alexa Peterson | Pennsylvania Rebellion | Signing | Alexa Peterson signs with Rebellion - 2-year deal |
| 3/3/2015 | Samie Garcia | Pennsylvania Rebellion | Signing | Free Agent Samie Garcia re-signs with Rebellion |
| 2/27/2015 | Yuri Masuyama | Pennsylvania Rebellion | Signing | Yuri Masuyama (Japan) signs with Rebellion |
| 2/27/2015 | Nerissa Myers | Akron Racers | Signing | Nerissa Myers re-signs with Racers |
| 2/25/2015 | Kirsten Verdun | Chicago Bandits | Signing | Kirsten Verdun re-signs with Bandits |
| 2/25/2015 | Alisa Goler | Pennsylvania Rebellion | Signing | Free Agent Alisa Goler signs with Rebellion - 2-year deal |
| 2/25/2015 | Courtney Senas | Pennsylvania Rebellion | Signing | Courtney Senas signs with Rebellion - 2-year deal |
| 2/25/2015 | Molly Fichtner | Dallas Charge | Signing | Molly Fichtner signs with Charge |
| 2/25/2015 | Bailey Watts | Dallas Charge | Signing | Bailey Watts signs with Charge |
| 2/17/2015 | Mikey Kenney | Dallas Charge | Signing | Mikey Kenney signs with Charge |
| 2/17/2015 | Angeline Quiocho | Dallas Charge | Signing | Free Agent Angeline Quiocho signs with Charge |
| 2/17/2015 | Taylor Thom | Dallas Charge | Signing | Taylor Thom signs with Charge |
| 2/13/2015 | Bianca Mejia | Pennsylvania Rebellion | Release | Bianca Mejia released from Rebellion |
| 2/13/2015 | Nicole Morgan | Pennsylvania Rebellion | Release | Nicole Morgan released from Rebellion |
| 2/13/2015 | Kortney Salvarola | Pennsylvania Rebellion | Release | Kortney Salvarola released from Rebellion |
| 2/13/2015 | Andie Varsho | Pennsylvania Rebellion | Release | Andie Varsho released from Rebellion |
| 2/13/2015 | Olivia Watkins | Pennsylvania Rebellion | Signing | Olivia Watkins signs with Rebellion - 2-year deal |
| 2/13/2015 | Mandy Ogle | Pennsylvania Rebellion | Signing | Mandy Ogle re-negotiates contract - 2-year deal |
| 2/13/2015 | Brittney Lindley | Pennsylvania Rebellion | Signing | Brittney Lindley re-signs with Rebellion |
| 2/13/2015 | Victoria Hayward | Pennsylvania Rebellion | Signing | Victoria Hayward re-signs with Rebellion - 2-year deal |
| 2/13/2015 | Dagmar Bloeming | Pennsylvania Rebellion | Signing | Dagmar Bloeming signs with Rebellion - 2-year deal |
| 2/13/2015 | Angel Bunner | Pennsylvania Rebellion | Signing | Angel Bunner re-signs with Rebellion - 2-year deal |
| 2/13/2015 | Laura Winter | Akron Racers | Signing | Laura Winter signs with Racers |
| 2/12/2015 | Morgan Melloh | Dallas Charge | Signing | Morgan Melloh signs with Charge. |
| 2/12/2015 | Laura Winter | Akron Racers | Signing | Laura Winter signs with Racers |
| 2/11/2015 | Sarah Pauly | Akron Racers | Signing | Sarah Pauly signs with Racers |
| 2/10/2015 | Kailee Cuico | Akron Racers | Signing | Kailee Cuico re-signs with Racers |
| 2/9/2015 | Kaylyn Castillo | Dallas Charge | Signing | Kaylyn Castillo signs with Charge |
| 2/9/2015 | Olivia Watkins | Pennsylvania Rebellion | Trade | Olivia Watkins (Racers) rights were assigned to Rebellion |
| 2/4/2015 | Virginie Anneveld | Pennsylvania Rebellion | Signing | Virginie Anneveld signs with Rebellion - 2-year deal |
| 2/4/2015 | Kaylyn Castillo | Dallas Charge | Trade | Kaylyn Castillo traded from Bandits to Charge in exchange for Charge 4th Round Draft Pick in 2016 |
| 1/30/2015 | Aimee Creger | Akron Racers | Signing | Aimee Creger signs with Racers |
| 1/30/2015 | Hannah Campbell | Akron Racers | Signing | Hannah Campbell re-signs with Racers |
| 1/30/2015 | Andi Williamson | USSSA Florida Pride | Signing | Andi Williamson signs with Pride - 2-year deal |
| 1/30/2015 | Megan Wiggins | USSSA Florida Pride | Signing | Megan Wiggins signs with Pride - 2-year deal |
| 1/29/2015 | Natalie Villarreal | Dallas Charge | Signing | Natalie Villarreal signs with Charge. |
| 1/28/2015 | Monica Abbott | Chicago Bandits | Franchise Player Tag | Bandits place a Franchise Player Tag on Monica Abbott |
| 1/28/2015 | Kirsten Verdun | Chicago Bandits | Franchise Player Tag | Bandits place a Franchise Player Tag on Kirsten Verdun |
| 1/27/2015 | | | Trade | Pride agree to waive the rights to the “Player to be Named Later” in the April 15, 2014 trade with Rebellion |
| 1/27/2015 | Ashley Thomas | Akron Racers | Signing | Ashley Thomas re-signs with Racers |
| 1/27/2015 | Sarah Pauly | Akron Racers | Trade | Rebellion trade RHP Sarah Pauly to Akron Racers for the Racers #8 Overall Pick in the 2015 NPF Draft and the Racers 3rd Round Pick in the 2016 NPF Draft |
| 1/27/2015 | Alexa Peterson | Pennsylvania Rebellion | Trade | Pride trade OF Alexa Peterson and Pride's #25 overall pick in the 2015 NPF Draft to Rebellion for the rights to RHP Andi Williamson |
| 1/27/2015 | Andi Williamson | USSSA Florida Pride | Trade | Pride trade OF Alexa Peterson and Pride's #25 overall pick in the 2015 NPF Draft to Rebellion for the rights to RHP Andi Williamson |
| 1/27/2015 | Tammy Williams | Chicago Bandits | Signing | Tammy Williams re-signs with Bandits |
| 1/26/2015 | Jolene Henderson | Dallas Charge | Signing | Jolene Henderson signs with Charge - becoming the first player to sign in franchise history. |
| 1/26/2015 | Alison Owen | Akron Racers | Signing | Alison Owen re-signs with Racers |
| 1/19/2015 | Jennifer Gilbert | Akron Racers | Signing | Jennifer Gilbert re-signs with Racers |
| 1/19/2015 | Amber Patton | Chicago Bandits | Signing | Amber Patton re-signs with Bandits |
| 1/19/2015 | Kristyn Sandberg | Pennsylvania Rebellion | Trade | Pride traded Kristyn Sandberg along with the 6th overall and 14th overall pick in 2015 NPF Draft to Rebellion for Megan Wiggins along with the 11th overall pick in 2015 NPF Draft |
| 1/19/2015 | Megan Wiggins | USSSA Florida Pride | Trade | Pride traded Kristyn Sandberg along with the 6th overall and 14th overall pick in 2015 NPF Draft to Rebellion for Megan Wiggins along with the 11th overall pick in 2015 NPF Draft |
| 1/19/2015 | Megan Wiggins | Pennsylvania Rebellion | Signing | Megan Wiggins signs with Rebellion |
| 1/16/2015 | Jill Barrett | Akron Racers | Signing | Jill Barrett re-signs with Racers |
| 1/16/2015 | Kelley Montalvo | Akron Racers | Signing | Kelley Montalvo re-signs with Racers |
| 1/16/2015 | Haley Outon | Akron Racers | Signing | Haley Outon re-signs with Racers |
| 1/15/2015 | Danielle Zymkowitz | Chicago Bandits | Signing | Danielle Zymkowitz re-signs with Bandits |
| 1/14/2015 | Brittany Cervantes | Chicago Bandits | Signing | Brittany Cervantes re-signs with Bandits |
| 1/14/2015 | GiOnna DiSalvatore | USSSA Florida Pride | Signing | GiOnna DiSalvatore re-signs with Pride - 2-year deal |
| 1/14/2015 | Andrea Duran | USSSA Florida Pride | Signing | Andrea Duran re-signs with Pride - 2-year deal |
| 1/14/2015 | Kelly Kretschman | USSSA Florida Pride | Signing | Kelly Kretschman re-signs with Pride - 2-year deal |
| 1/14/2015 | Cat Osterman | USSSA Florida Pride | Signing | Cat Osterman re-signs with Pride |
| 1/14/2015 | Kristyn Sandberg | USSSA Florida Pride | Signing | Kristyn Sandberg re-signs with Pride - 2-year deal |
| 1/14/2015 | Jessica Shults | USSSA Florida Pride | Signing | Jessica Shults re-signs with Pride - 2-year deal |
| 1/14/2015 | Jordan Taylor | USSSA Florida Pride | Signing | Jordan Taylor re-signs with Pride - 2-year deal |
| 1/14/2015 | Chelsea Thomas | USSSA Florida Pride | Signing | Chelsea Thomas re-signs with Pride - 2-year deal |
| 1/14/2015 | Natasha Watley | USSSA Florida Pride | Signing | Natasha Watley re-signs with Pride |
| 1/14/2015 | Megan Willis | USSSA Florida Pride | Signing | Megan Willis re-signs with Pride - 2-year deal |
| 1/10/2015 | Tatum Edwards | Chicago Bandits | Trade | Bandits traded Megan Wiggins and Andi Williamson to Rebellion in exchange for Tatum Edwards and Taylor Edwards |
| 1/10/2015 | Taylor Edwards | Chicago Bandits | Trade | Bandits traded Megan Wiggins and Andi Williamson to Rebellion in exchange for Tatum Edwards and Taylor Edwards |
| 1/10/2015 | Megan Wiggins | Pennsylvania Rebellion | Trade | Bandits traded Megan Wiggins and Andi Williamson to Rebellion in exchange for Tatum Edwards and Taylor Edwards |
| 1/10/2015 | Andi Williamson | Pennsylvania Rebellion | Trade | Bandits traded Megan Wiggins and Andi Williamson to Rebellion in exchange for Tatum Edwards and Taylor Edwards |
| 11/26/2014 | RT Cantillo | Chicago Bandits | Signing | RT Cantillo re-signs with Bandits |
| 11/18/2014 | Michelle Gascoigne | Chicago Bandits | Signing | Michelle Gascoigne re-signs with Bandits |
| 11/11/2014 | Hannah Rogers | USSSA Florida Pride | Signing | Hannah Rogers signs with Pride - 2 Year Deal |
| 10/21/2014 | Alex Booker | Chicago Bandits | Signing | Alex Booker re-signs with Bandits |
| 10/20/2014 | Sara Moulton | Chicago Bandits | Signing | Sara Moulton re-signs with Bandits |
| 10/15/2014 | Natalie Hernandez | Chicago Bandits | Signing | Natalie Hernandez re-signs with Bandits |
| 10/06/2014 | Emily Allard | Chicago Bandits | Signing | Emily Allard re-signs with Bandits |
