= 2015 National Pro Fastpitch season =

2015 NPF Season
- League: National Pro Fastpitch
- Sport: softball
- Duration: May 29, 2015 – August 11, 2015
- Teams: 5
- TV partner(s): CBS Sports Network, Longhorn Network/ESPN3

2015 NPF Draft
- Top draft pick: Lauren Chamberlain 1B; Oklahoma
- Picked by: USSSA Florida Pride

Regular Season
- NPF Trophy (Best record): USSSA Florida Pride
- Runners-up: Chicago Bandits
- Player of the Year: Kelly Kretschman
- Pitcher of the Year: Monica Abbott

Cowles Cup
- Champions: Chicago Bandits
- Runners-up: USSSA Pride
- Finals MVP: Monica Abbott Chicago Bandits

NPF seasons
- 2014 2016

The 2015 National Pro Fastpitch season was the 12th season of professional softball under the name National Pro Fastpitch (NPF) for the only professional women's softball league in the United States. From 1997 to 2002, NPF operated under the names Women's Pro Fastpitch (WPF) and Women's Pro Softball League (WPSL). Each year, the playoff teams battle for the Cowles Cup.

== Milestones and events ==
In January 2015, the NPF announced that the Dallas Charge would join the league as an expansion team.

The NPF and CBS Sports Network signed a 2015 agreement for the network to broadcast the NPF Draft, selected regular season games, and all of the NPF Championship Series.

The Pride's homestand against the Bandits, Rebellion, and Racers from July 15 to July 25 was broadcast on the Longhorn Network and was subsequently available for streaming on ESPN3.

On July 10, Cat Osterman pitched the fifth no-hitter of her NPF career, beating the Pennsylvania Rebellion 2-1. (The Rebellion scored their run in the first inning without a hit, by combining two walks and three HBP. Pennsylvania actually led 1-0 going to the 7th inning.)

On July 23, Monica Abbott pitched her second perfect game as a member of the Bandits, beating the Charge, 10-0.

On August 3, Monica Abbott pitched a no-hitter against the Pennsylvania Rebellion, winning 3-0. The pursuit of a perfect game ended in the seventh inning, on a Chicago error and later a walk.

On August 8, Sarah Pauly became the first NPF pitcher to win 100 games.

=== Rule changes ===
The League Management Committee - consisting of Akron Racers owner Craig Stout, Chicago Bandits general manager Aaron Moore, Dallas Charge general manager Kevin Shelton, Pennsylvania Rebellion owner Stu Williams, and USSSA Pride general manager Don DeDonatis - met in Kissimmee, FL and voted on the following items:

- Voted unanimously to use, during doubleheaders, a tiebreaker in the 8th inning due to the overall length of playing time that can take place on a double-header day. Motion was made to implement the tie breaker in the 8th inning of a "true" double header, meaning the same two teams playing each other on the same day, regardless of whether the match-up was scheduled in advance or the result of a make-up game. The motion did not include the discussion of using a run-rule after 5 innings.
- Rejected a motion to use a "run-rule" of 8 runs after 5 innings.
- Voted to allow individual teams the option to conduct autograph sessions as they choose for the Home Team. (Visiting Team must continue to make all players available for autograph session.)
- Voted to allow backstops to exceed the current limit of 30' and to continue playing by rules implemented mid-season in 2014.
- Voted to require umpires to confiscate any and all broken bats that occur during a game and forward them immediately to the League Office. From there, they will be returned to manufacturers and tested to insure they meet regulatory standards. In the event the bat is assessed to be altered, player and team will be assessed appropriate fines.
- Voted to allow the continuance of no tiebreaker in Championship Series play, (acknowledging that for television or other special circumstances such as play delays, it may be implemented).
- Voted to raise the per diem for coaches, trainers and players from a $25 per day allowance to a $30 per day allowance ($6 Breakfast, $9 Lunch, $15 Dinner)
- Voted on sponsorship real estate inside ballpark venues for televised games to be used as follows:
  - From outfield side of dugout around the backstop to outfield side of other dugout belongs to the league if they desire or require to use. This will be for league branding, exclusive category branding and television sponsor branding.
  - From outfield side of dugout down the sidelines and around the outfield fence to the outfield side of the other dugout belongs to the home team if they desire or require to use.
  - Exceptions may be made to the above.
- Voted to allow teams brand one sleeve of each and every uniform with a sponsor brand, if desired.
- Voted that beginning in 2015, only official suppliers will be allowed into the headband category and those will be the only headbands allowed on the field of play.
- Voted that logo sizing limitations will be distributed to official suppliers and must be adhered to on any and all equipment and apparel that makes the NPF playing field (which includes dugouts).
- Draft order was distributed including the addition of expansion Dallas. Dallas was offered a "Market Choice Selection," which they later used to acquire Renada Davis.
- Voted that the first item of the "Tie Breaking Procedure" to determine regular season standings would be deleted. This places "Head to head" as the first determiner in tie breaking.
- Agreed that a scheduling meeting (for 2016 schedule) would be held at the NFCA Convention in Atlanta in December 2015.

== Teams, cities and stadiums ==
Team	City	Stadium
Akron Racers	Akron, Ohio	Firestone Stadium
Chicago Bandits	Rosemont, Illinois (Chicago Area)	Ballpark at Rosemont
Dallas Charge	Dallas–Fort Worth, Texas	Craig Ranch (McKinney) and Allan Saxe Field (Arlington)
Pennsylvania Rebellion	Washington, Pennsylvania	Consol Energy Park
USSSA Florida Pride	Kissimmee, Florida	Champion Stadium

National Pro Fastpitch teams

=== Other sites ===
- The USSSA Florida Pride and Dallas Charge are scheduled to play a two-game series at CommunityAmerica Ballpark in Kansas City, Kansas on June 11 and 12, 2015.
- The USSSA Florida Pride and Dallas Charge are scheduled to play a two-game series at University Field in Columbia, Missouri on June 15 and 16, 2015.
- The USSSA Florida Pride and Dallas Charge are scheduled to play a two-game series at St. Mary's University in San Antonio, Texas, on August 6 and 7, 2015.
- The USSSA Florida Pride and Pennsylvania Rebellion are scheduled to play a game at Santander Stadium in York, Pennsylvania June 25 and two games at Clipper Magazine Stadium in Lancaster, Pennsylvania June 26 and 27,2015.
- The Dallas Charge and Akron Racers are scheduled to play a four-game series in Colorado at Twin Rivers Community Park in Greeley, Erie Community Park in Erie, Christopher Fields in Westminster and Aurora Sports Park in Aurora from June 29-July 2, 2015.
- The USSSA Florida Pride and Pennsylvania Rebellion are scheduled to play series at Ned Skeldon Stadium in Maumee, Ohio July 3 and 4, 2015.
- The Dallas Charge and Akron Racers are scheduled to play a two-game series at Berliner Park in Columbus, Ohio July 17 and 18, 2015. On August 1, 2015 at Berliner Park Dallas Charge will play Akron Racers, immediately followed by Chicago Bandits playing the Pennsylvania Rebellion.
- The USSSA Florida Pride and Chicago Bandits are scheduled to play a two-game series at Louisville Slugger Sports Complex in Peoria, Illinois July 29 and 30, 2015.
- The USSSA Florida Pride and Dallas Charge are scheduled to play a two-game series at Constellation Field in Sugar Land, Texas August 3 and 4, 2015.

== Player acquisition ==
=== College draft ===
The 2015 NPF College Draft was held on Wednesday, April 1, 2015, 5:30 pm CST at the CMA Theater in the Country Music Hall of Fame and Museum in Nashville, Tennessee. Lauren Chamberlain of Oklahoma was selected first by USSSA Florida Pride. Draft order was determined by regular season standings from 2014, but subsequent trades and transactions altered the overall draft order.

=== Notable transactions ===
- Monica Abbott re-signed with Chicago Bandits for 2015 season.

== League standings ==
Through 8/10/15 Source:ProFastpitch.com

Team	GP	W	L	Pct.	GB
**USSSA Florida Pride**	48	34	14	.708	-
**Chicago Bandits**	48	31	17	.646	3
**Akron Racers**	48	22	26	.458	12
**Dallas Charge**	48	17	31	.354	17
**Pennsylvania Rebellion**	48	16	32	.333	19

=== Results table ===
2015 NPF Records
Team	Racers	Bandits	Charge	Rebellion	Pride
Akron Racers	–	5-7	7–5	5–7	5–7
Chicago Bandits	7–5	–	9–3	10–2	5-7
Dallas Charge	5–7	3–9	–	6–6	3–9
Pennsylvania Rebellion	7-5	2–10	6-6	–	1–11
USSSA Florida Pride	7–5	7-5	9–3	11–1	–

All stats come from

Legend
	Protest/Halted Game
	Postponement
**Bold**	Winning team

=== 2015 Game log ===
May/June

Date	Visiting team	Home team	Venue	Score	Win	Loss	Save	Attendance
5/29/2015	**W Chicago Bandits** (1-0)	**L** Pennsylvania Rebellion (0-1)	Consol Energy Park - Washington, PA	2-0	Kirsten Verdun (1-0)	Angel Bunner(0-1)	-	1013
5/30/2015	**L** Akron Racers (0-1)	**W Pennsylvania Rebellion** (1-1)	Consol Energy Park - Washington, PA	3-6	Allyson Fournier (1-0)	Hannah Campbell (0-1)	Angel Bunner (S1)	
5/30/2015	**W Chicago Bandits** (2-0)	**L** Pennsylvania Rebellion (1-2)	Consol Energy Park - Washington, PA	5-0	Sara Moulton (1-0)	Emma Johnson (0-1)	-	1002
5/31/2015	**W Chicago Bandits** (3-0)	**L** Pennsylvania Rebellion (1-3)	Consol Energy Park - Washington, PA	12-4	Tatum Edwards (1-0)	Bryanna Walker (0-1)	-	
5/31/2015	**W Akron Racers** (1-1)	**L** Pennsylvania Rebellion (1-4)	Consol Energy Park - Washington, PA	2-1 (8 innings)	Laura Winter (1-0)	Dallas Escobedo (0-1)	-	986
6/3/2015	**W Pennsylvania Rebellion** (2-4)	**L** Dallas Charge (0-1)	The Ballfields at Craig Ranch - McKinney, TX	4-3	Angel Bunner (1-1)	Sarah Purvis (0-1)	-	701
6/4/2015	**L** Akron Racers (1-2)	**W Chicago Bandits** (4-0)	The Ballpark at Rosemont - Rosemont, IL	5-6 (8 innings)	Tatum Edwards (2-0)	Laura Winter (1-1)	-	1065
6/4/2015	**L** Pennsylvania Rebellion (2-5)	**W Dallas Charge** (1-1)	The Ballfields at Craig Ranch - McKinney, TX	5-9	Vanessa Stokes (1-0)	Bryana Walker (0-2)	-	
6/5/2015	**L** Pennsylvania Rebellion (2-6)	**W Dallas Charge** (2-1)	Allan Saxe Field - UTA, Arlington, TX	0-3	Vanessa Stokes (2-0)	Allyson Fournier (1-1)	Sarah Purvis (S1)	
6/5/2015	**L** Akron Racers (1-3)	**W Chicago Bandits** (5-0)	The Ballpark at Rosemont - Rosemont, IL	1-3	Lacey Waldrop (1-0)	Lisa Norris (0-1)	-	938
6/6/2015	**W USSSA Florida Pride** (1-0)	**L** Dallas Charge (2-2)	The Ballfields at Craig Ranch - McKinney, TX	10-2	Cat Osterman (1-0)	Sarah Purvis (0-2)	-	
6/6/2015	**W Akron Racers** (2-3)	**L** Chicago Bandits (5-1)	The Ballpark at Rosemont - Rosemont, IL	8-4 (9 innings)	Sarah Pauly (1-0)	Tatum Edwards (2-1)	-	799
6/7/2015	**W USSSA Florida Pride** (2-0)	**L** Dallas Charge (2-3)	The Ballfields at Craig Ranch - McKinney, TX	3-1	Chelsea Thomas (1-0)	Vanessa Stokes (2-1)	Jordan Taylor (S1)	548
6/8/2015	**W USSSA Florida Pride** (3-0)	**L** Dallas Charge (2-4)	The Ballfields at Craig Ranch - McKinney, TX	4-3	Chelsea Thomas (2-0)	Sarah Purvis (0-3)	Jordan Taylor (S2)	551
6/8/2015	**W Chicago Bandits** (6-1)	**L** Pennsylvania Rebellion (2-7)	Consol Energy Park - Washington, PA	4-2 (6 innings, rain shortened)	Sara Moulton (2-0)	Emily Weiman (0-1)	-	302
6/9/2015	**W USSSA Florida Pride** (4-0)	**L** Dallas Charge (2-5)	The Ballfields at Craig Ranch - McKinney, TX	4-1	Cat Osterman (2-0)	Lauren Haeger (0-1)	-	476
6/9/2015	Chicago Bandits	Pennsylvania Rebellion	Consol Energy Park - Washington, PA	The Rebellion's protest was upheld and game halted after 9 innings. To be resumed on July 5. (Note: June 9 game was originally ruled an 11-inning 7-3 win for the Bandits. The Rebellion lodged a protest because the international tie breaker rule ( which states innings begin with a runner on second base) was not used in the 10th or 11th innings. Upon review, NPF upheld the protest and declared the game 'halted' at the point the tiebreaker rule should have been used. The game is to resume at the start of the 10th inning on July 5.)				
6/10/2015	**W Chicago Bandits** (7-1)	**L** Pennsylvania Rebellion (2-8)	Consol Energy Park - Washington, PA	5-0	Michelle Gascoigne (1-0)	Dallas Escobedo (0-2)	-	667
6/11/2015	**W Pennsylvania Rebellion** (3-8)	**L** Akron Racers (2-4)	Firestone Stadium - Akron, OH	2-1	Emily Weiman (1-1)	Lisa Norris (0-2)	Emma Johnson (S1)	
6/11/2015	**W Dallas Charge** (3-5)	**L** USSSA Florida Pride (4-1)	CommunityAmerica Ballpark - Kansas City, Kansas	5-2	Vanessa Stokes (3-1)	Hannah Rogers (0-1)	Lauren Haeger (S1)	
6/12/2015	**L** Pennsylvania Rebellion (3-9)	**W Akron Racers** (3-4)	Firestone Stadium - Akron, OH	3-6	Sarah Pauly (2-0)	Dagmar Bloeming (0-1)	-	
6/12/2015	**W USSSA Florida Pride** (5-1)	**L** Dallas Charge (3-6)	CommunityAmerica Ballpark - Kansas City, Kansas	6-0	Cat Osterman (3-0)	Lauren Haeger (0-2)	-	
6/13/2015	Pennsylvania Rebellion	Akron Racers	Firestone Stadium - Akron, OH	**Postponed (inclement weather)**(Makeup date:June 14)				
6/14/2015; Doubleheader/ makeup game	**W Pennsylvania Rebellion** (4-9)	**L** Akron Racers (3-5)	Firestone Stadium - Akron, OH	7-3	Dallas Escobedo (1-2)	Aimee Creger (0-1)	Emily Weiman (S1)	
6/14/2015; Doubleheader/ makeup game	Pennsylvania Rebellion	Akron Racers	Firestone Stadium - Akron, OH	**Postponed (inclement weather)**(Makeup date:August 7)				
6/15/2015	**W Dallas Charge** (4-6)	**L** USSSA Florida Pride (5-2)	University Field - Columbia, Missouri	4-1	Jolene Henderson (1-0)	Chelsea Thomas (2-1)	-	691
6/16/2015	Dallas Charge	USSSA Florida Pride	University Field - Columbia, Missouri	**Postponed (inclement weather)**(Makeup date:8/6/2015)				
6/17/2015	**W Chicago Bandits** (8-1)	**L** Akron Racers (3-6)	Firestone Stadium - Akron, OH	6-4	Monica Abbott (1-0)	Sarah Pauly (2-1)	-	
6/17/2015	Pennsylvania Rebellion	Dallas Charge	The Ballfields at Craig Ranch - McKinney, TX	**Postponed (inclement weather)**(Makeup date: June 18)				
6/18/2015	Chicago Bandits	Akron Racers	Firestone Stadium - Akron, OH	**Postponed (inclement weather)**(Makeup date: June 19)				
6/18/2015; Doubleheader/ makeup game	**W Pennsylvania Rebellion** (5-9)	**L** Dallas Charge (4-7)	The Ballfields at Craig Ranch - McKinney, TX	3-2	Emma Johnson (1-1)	Morgan Melloh (0-1)	Haylie Wagner (S1)	53
6/18/2015; Doubleheader/ makeup game	**L** Pennsylvania Rebellion (5-10)	**W Dallas Charge** (5-7)	The Ballfields at Craig Ranch - McKinney, TX	0-1 (8 innings)	Jolene Henderson (2-0)	Dallas Escobedo (1-3)	-	145
6/19/2015	**L** Pennsylvania Rebellion (5-11)	**W Dallas Charge** (6-7)	The Ballfields at Craig Ranch - McKinney, TX	5-6 (9 innings)	Lauren Haeger (1-2)	Emily Weiman (1-2)	-	
6/19/2015; Doubleheader/ makeup game	**L** Chicago Bandits (8-2)	**W Akron Racers** (4-6)	Firestone Stadium - Akron, OH	7-11	Alison Owen (1-0)	Lacey Waldrop (1-1)	Sarah Pauly (S1)	
6/19/2015; Doubleheader/ makeup game	**W Chicago Bandits** (9-2)	**L** Akron Racers (4-7)	Firestone Stadium - Akron, OH	11-3	Michelle Gascoigne (2-0)	Laura Winter (1-2)	-	
6/21/2015	**L** Dallas Charge (6-8)	**W Chicago Bandits** (10-2)	The Ballpark at Rosemont - Rosemont, IL	0-2	Kirsten Verdun (2-0)	Jolene Henderson (2-1)	-	881
6/21/2015	**W USSSA Florida Pride** (6-2)	**L** Akron Racers (4-8)	Firestone Stadium - Akron, OH	6-2	Keilani Ricketts (1-0)	Lisa Norris (0-3)	Jordan Taylor (S3)	
6/22/2015	**L** USSSA Florida Pride (6-3)	**W Akron Racers** (5-8)	Firestone Stadium - Akron, OH	0-2	Sarah Pauly (3-1)	Cat Osterman (3-1)	-	
6/22/2015	**L** Dallas Charge (6-9)	**W Chicago Bandits** (11-2)	The Ballpark at Rosemont - Rosemont, IL	0-4	Monica Abbott (2-0)	Lauren Haeger (1-3)	-	961
6/23/2015	**L** USSSA Florida Pride (6-4)	**W Akron Racers** (6-8)	Firestone Stadium - Akron, OH	2-3	Lisa Norris (1-3)	Jordan Taylor (0-1)	-	582
6/23/2015	**L** Dallas Charge (6-10)	**W Chicago Bandits** (12-2)	The Ballpark at Rosemont - Rosemont, IL	0-2	Sara Moulton (3-0)	Morgan Melloh (0-2)	Michelle Gascoigne (S1)	1164
6/25/2015	**L** Chicago Bandits (12-3)	**W Akron Racers** (7-8)	Firestone Stadium - Akron, OH	0-6	Sarah Pauly (4-1)	Tatum Edwards (2-2)	-	
6/25/2015	**W USSSA Florida Pride** (7-4)	**L** Pennsylvania Rebellion (5-12)	Santander Stadium, York, PA	4-3 (12 innings)	Cat Osterman (4-1)	Emily Weiman (1-3)	-	3265
6/26/2015	**W USSSA Florida Pride** (8-4)	**L** Pennsylvania Rebellion (5-13)	Clipper Magazine Stadium, Lancaster, PA	4-2 (10 innings)	Hannah Rogers (1-1)	Haylie Wagner (0-1)	Jordan Taylor (S4)	2812
6/26/2015	**L** Chicago Bandits (12-4)	**W Akron Racers** (8-8)	Firestone Stadium - Akron, OH	2-5	Lisa Norris (2-3)	Michelle Gascoigne (2-1)	-	418
6/27/2015	USSSA Florida Pride	Pennsylvania Rebellion	Clipper Magazine Stadium, Lancaster, PA	**Postponed (inclement weather)**(Makeup date: July 11)				
6/27/2015	**W Chicago Bandits** (13-4)	**L** Akron Racers (8-9)	Firestone Stadium - Akron, OH	2-0	Monica Abbott (3-0)	Alison Owen (1-1)	-	
6/29/2015	**W Akron Racers** (9-9)	**L** Dallas Charge (6-11)	Twin Rivers Community Park - Greeley, CO	3-2	Sarah Pauly (5-1)	Jolene Henderson (2-2)	-	
6/29/2015	**W USSSA Florida Pride** (9-4)	**L** Chicago Bandits (13-5)	The Ballpark at Rosemont - Rosemont, IL	3-2 (10 innings)	Keilani Ricketts (2-0)	Monica Abbott (3-1)	Jordan Taylor (S5)	1130
6/30/2015	**W Akron Racers (10-9)**	**L** Dallas Charge (6-12)	Erie Community Park - Erie, CO	5-2	Lisa Norris (3-3)	Lauren Haeger (1-4)	-	
6/30/2015	**W USSSA Florida Pride** (10-4)	**L** Chicago Bandits (13-6)	The Ballpark at Rosemont - Rosemont, IL	3-2	Cat Osterman (5-1)	Lacey Waldrop (1-2)	-	854

July

Date	Visiting team	Home team	Venue	Score	Win	Loss	Save	Attendance
7/1/2015	**W Akron Racers** (11-9)	**L** Dallas Charge (6-13)	Christopher Fields - Westminster, CO	9-1	Rachele Fico (1-0)	Morgan Melloh (0-3)	-	
7/1/2015	**L** USSSA Florida Pride (10-5)	**W Chicago Bandits** (14-6)	The Ballpark at Rosemont - Rosemont, IL	0-7	Monica Abbott (4-1)	Keilani Ricketts (2-1)	-	939
7/2/2015	**L** Akron Racers (11-10)	**W Dallas Charge** (7-13)	Aurora Sports Park - Aurora, CO	5-8	Lauren Haeger (2-4)	Sarah Pauly (5-2)	-	
7/2/2015	**L** USSSA Florida Pride (10-6)	**W Chicago Bandits** (15-6)	The Ballpark at Rosemont - Rosemont, IL	0-2	Michelle Gascoigne (3-1)	Cat Osterman (5-2)	-	886
7/3/2015	**L** Pennsylvania Rebellion (5-14)	**W USSSA Florida Pride** (11-6)	Ned Skeldon Stadium - Maumee, OH	0-4	Chelsea Thomas (3-1)	Dallas Escobedo (1-4)	-	135
7/4/2015	**W Akron Racers** (12-10)	**L** Dallas Charge (7-14)	The Ballfields at Craig Ranch - McKinney, TX	7-1	Lisa Norris (4-3)	Jolene Henderson (2-3)	-	950
7/4/2015	**L** Pennsylvania Rebellion (5-15)	**W USSSA Florida Pride** (12-6)	Ned Skeldon Stadium - Maumee, OH	2-5	Hannah Rogers (2-1)	Dagmar Bloeming (0-2)	Jordan Taylor (S6)	
7/5/2015; Resumption of June 9 halted game	**L** Pennsylvania Rebellion (5-16)	**W Chicago Bandits** (16-6)	The Ballpark at Rosemont - Rosemont, IL	6-7 (10 innings)	Tatum Edwards (3-2)	Dallas Escobedo (1-5)	-	
7/5/2015	**L** Pennsylvania Rebellion (5-17)	**W Chicago Bandits** (17-6)	The Ballpark at Rosemont - Rosemont, IL	3-6	Lacey Waldrop (2-2)	Emily Weiman (1-4)	-	941
7/5/2015	**L** Akron Racers (12-11)	**W Dallas Charge** (8-14)	The Ballfields at Craig Ranch - McKinney, TX	5-11	Vanessa Stokes (4-1)	Alison Owen (1-2)	-	473
7/6/2015	**L** Pennsylvania Rebellion (5-18)	**W Chicago Bandits** (18-6)	The Ballpark at Rosemont - Rosemont, IL	0-1	Monica Abbott (5-1)	Haylie Wagner (0-2)	-	904
7/7/2015	**L** Akron Racers (12-12)	**W USSSA Florida Pride** (13-6)	Firestone Stadium - Akron, OH	1-4	Cat Osterman (6-2)	Hannah Campbell (0-2)	Jordan Taylor (S7)	556
7/7/2015	USSSA Florida Pride	Akron Racers	Firestone Stadium - Akron, OH		**Postponed (inclement weather)**(Makeup date:July 8)			
7/7/2015	**L** Pennsylvania Rebellion (5-19)	**W Chicago Bandits** (19-6)	The Ballpark at Rosemont - Rosemont, IL	2-3	Michelle Gascoigne (4-1)	Emma Johnson (1-2)	-	1394
7/8/2015	**L** USSSA Florida Pride (13-7)	**W Akron Racers** (13-12)	Firestone Stadium - Akron, OH	4-5	Sarah Pauly (6-2)	Hannah Rogers (2-2)	-	
7/8/2015	**W USSSA Florida Pride** (14-7)	**L** Akron Racers (13-13)	Firestone Stadium - Akron, OH	5-1	Keilani Ricketts (3-1)	Rachele Fico (1-1)	-	732
7/9/2015	**W USSSA Florida Pride** (15-7)	**L** Akron Racers (13-14)	Firestone Stadium - Akron, OH	6-4	Jordan Taylor (1-1)	Lisa Norris (4-4)	-	527
7/9/2015	**W Chicago Bandits** (20-6)	**L** Dallas Charge (8-15)	Allan Saxe Field - UTA, Arlington, TX	4-3	Kirsten Verdun (3-0)	Morgan Melloh (0-4)	Lacey Waldrop (S1)	347
7/10/2015	**W Chicago Bandits** (21-6)	**L** Dallas Charge (8-16)	The Ballfields at Craig Ranch - McKinney, TX	1-0	Monica Abbott (6-1)	Jolene Henderson (2-4)	-	578
7/10/2015	**W USSSA Florida Pride** (16-7)	**L** Pennsylvania Rebellion (5-20)	Consol Energy Park - Washington, PA	2-1	Cat Osterman (7-2); **No-Hitter**	Miranda Kramer (0-1)	-	986
7/11/2015	**L** Chicago Bandits (21-7)	**W Dallas Charge** (9-16)	The Ballfields at Craig Ranch - McKinney, TX	0-5	Lauren Haeger (3-4)	Sara Moulton (3-1)	-	447
7/11/2015; Doubleheader/ makeup game	**W USSSA Florida Pride** (17-7)	**L** Pennsylvania Rebellion (5-21)	Consol Energy Park - Washington, PA	5-0	Keilani Ricketts (4-1)	Dallas Escobedo (1-6)	-	
7/11/2015; Doubleheader/ makeup game	**W USSSA Florida Pride** (18-7)	**L** Pennsylvania Rebellion (5-22)	Consol Energy Park - Washington, PA	2-0	Chelsea Thomas (4-1)	Emily Weiman (1-5)	-	1528
7/12/2015	**W USSSA Florida Pride** (19-7)	**L** Pennsylvania Rebellion (5-23)	Consol Energy Park - Washington, PA	3-0	Hannah Rogers (3-2)	Haylie Wagner (0-3)	Jordan Taylor (S8)	652
7/13/2015	**L** Chicago Bandits (21-8)	**W USSSA Florida Pride** (20-7)	Champion Stadium - Kissimmee, FL	2-5	Cat Osterman (8-2)	Lacey Waldrop (2-3)	-	1634
7/13/2015	**L** Dallas Charge (9-17)	**W Pennsylvania Rebellion** (6-23)	Consol Energy Park - Washington, PA	2-3 (10 innings)	Emma Johnson (2-2)	Lauren Haeger (3-5)	-	541
7/14/2015	**L** Chicago Bandits (21-9)	**W USSSA Florida Pride** (21-7)	Champion Stadium - Kissimmee, FL	3-5	Keilani Ricketts (5-1)	Michelle Gascoigne (4-2)	Jordan Taylor (S9)	941
7/14/2015	**L** Dallas Charge (9-18)	**W Pennsylvania Rebellion** (7-23)	Consol Energy Park - Washington, PA	4-5	Haylie Wagner (1-3)	Jolene Henderson (2-5)	-	1197
7/15/2015	**L** Dallas Charge (9-19)	**W Pennsylvania Rebellion** (8-23)	Consol Energy Park - Washington, PA	0-1	Dallas Escobedo (2-6)	Morgan Melloh (0-5)	-	601
7/15/2015	**W Chicago Bandits** (22-9)	**L** USSSA Florida Pride (21-8)	Champion Stadium - Kissimmee, FL	2-0	Monica Abbott (7-1)	Chelsea Thomas (4-2)	-	9752
7/16/2015	**W Dallas Charge** (10-19)	**L** Pennsylvania Rebellion (8-24)	Consol Energy Park - Washington, PA	3-0	Vanessa Stokes (5-1)	Miranda Kramer (0-2)	Jolene Henderson (S1)	898
7/16/2015	**L** Chicago Bandits (22-10)	**W USSSA Florida Pride** (22-8)	Champion Stadium - Kissimmee, FL	5-6	Cat Osterman (9-2)	Tatum Edwards (3-3)		921
7/17/2015	**L** Dallas Charge (10-20)	**W Akron Racers** (14-14)	Berliner Park, Columbus OH	0-1	Sarah Pauly (7-2)	Jolene Henderson (2-6)	-	777
7/18/2015	**W Dallas Charge** (11-20)	**L** Akron Racers (14-15)	Berliner Park, Columbus OH	9-6	Lauren Haeger (4-5)	Lisa Norris (4-5)	Morgan Melloh (S1)	565
7/18/2015	**W Pennsylvania Rebellion** (9-24)	**L** USSSA Florida Pride (22-9)	Champion Stadium - Kissimmee, FL	6-3	Haylie Wagner (2-3)	Keilani Ricketts (5-2)	Emily Weiman (S2)	12175
7/19/2015	**L** Pennsylvania Rebellion (9-25)	**W USSSA Florida Pride** (23-9)	Champion Stadium - Kissimmee, FL	1-3	Chelsea Thomas (5-2)	Miranda Kramer (0-3)	Jordan Taylor (S10)	
7/20/2015	**L** Pennsylvania Rebellion (9-26)	**W USSSA Florida Pride** (24-9)	Champion Stadium - Kissimmee, FL	1-7	Cat Osterman (10-2)	Dallas Escobedo (2-7)	-	674
7/20/2015	**W Dallas Charge** (12-20)	**L** Akron Racers (14-16)	Firestone Stadium - Akron, OH	9-0	Morgan Melloh (1-5)	Rachele Fico (1-2)	-	469
7/21/2015	**L** Pennsylvania Rebellion (9-27)	**W USSSA Florida Pride** (25-9)	Champion Stadium - Kissimmee, FL	1-3	Keilani Ricketts (6-2)	Emily Weiman (1-6)	Jordan Taylor (S11)	634
7/21/2015	**L** Dallas Charge (12-21)	**W Akron Racers** (15-16)	Firestone Stadium - Akron, OH	0-6	Sarah Pauly (8-2)	Jolene Henderson (2-7)	-	616
7/22/2015	**W Akron Racers** (16-16)	**L** USSSA Florida Pride (25-10)	Champion Stadium - Kissimmee, FL	5-4	Rachele Fico (2-2)	Chelsea Thomas (5-3)	-	502
7/23/2015	**L** Dallas Charge (12-22)	**W Chicago Bandits** (23-10)	The Ballpark at Rosemont - Rosemont, IL	0-10	Monica Abbott (8-1); **Perfect Game**	Vanessa Stokes (5-2)	-	1502
7/23/2015	**L** Akron Racers (16-17)	**W USSSA Florida Pride** (26-10)	Champion Stadium - Kissimmee, FL	1-2	Cat Osterman (11-2)	Lisa Norris (4-6)	-	711
7/24/2015	**L** Akron Racers (16-18)	**W USSSA Florida Pride** (27-10)	Champion Stadium - Kissimmee, FL	4-6	Keilani Ricketts (7-2)	Sarah Pauly (8-3)	-	613
7/24/2015	**W Dallas Charge** (13-22)	**L** Chicago Bandits (23-11)	The Ballpark at Rosemont - Rosemont, IL	9-2	Lauren Haeger (5-5)	Michelle Gascoigne (4-3)	-	1611
7/25/2015	**L** Akron Racers (16-19)	**W USSSA Florida Pride** (28-10)	Champion Stadium - Kissimmee, FL	2-8	Chelsea Thomas (6-3)	Rachele Fico (2-3)	-	568
7/25/2015	**L** Dallas Charge (13-23)	**W Chicago Bandits** (24-11)	The Ballpark at Rosemont - Rosemont, IL	0-1 (8 innings)	Monica Abbott (9-1)	Morgan Melloh (1-6)	-	1386
7/25/2015	**W Akron Racers** (17-19)	**L** USSSA Florida Pride (28-11)	Champion Stadium - Kissimmee, FL	5-1	Lisa Norris (5-6)	Andi Williamson (0-1)	-	578
7/27/2015	**W Dallas Charge** (14-23)	**L** Pennsylvania Rebellion (9-28)	Consol Energy Park - Washington, PA	3-2 (9 innings)	Jolene Henderson (3-7)	Dallas Escobedo (2-8)	-	782
7/27/2015	**L** USSSA Florida Pride (28-12)	**W Chicago Bandits** (25-11)	The Ballpark at Rosemont - Rosemont, IL	0-3 (9 innings)	Monica Abbott (10-1)	Keilani Ricketts (7-3)	-	1376
7/28/2015	**L** Dallas Charge (14-24)	**W Pennsylvania Rebellion** (10-28)	Consol Energy Park - Washington, PA	0-3	Emma Johnson (3-2)	Lauren Haeger (5-6)	Haylie Wagner (S2)	952
7/28/2015	**W USSSA Florida Pride** (29-12)	**L** Chicago Bandits (25-12)	The Ballpark at Rosemont - Rosemont, IL	5-2	Cat Osterman (12-2)	Michelle Gascoigne (4-4)	-	1375
7/29/2015	**W Akron Racers** (18-19)	**L** Pennsylvania Rebellion (10-29)	Consol Energy Park - Washington, PA	4-2	Sarah Pauly (9-3)	Emily Weiman (1-7)	-	1001
7/29/2015	**L** Chicago Bandits (25-12)	**W USSSA Florida Pride** (30-12)	Louisville Slugger Sports Complex - Peoria, IL	3-6	Chelsea Thomas (7-3)	Lacey Waldrop (2-4)	-	807
7/30/2015	**W Chicago Bandits** (26-12)	**L** USSSA Florida Pride (30-13)	Louisville Slugger Sports Complex - Peoria, IL	4-0	Monica Abbott (11-1)	Keilani Ricketts (7-4)	-	1211
7/31/2015	**L** Dallas Charge (14-25)	**W Akron Racers** (19-19)	Firestone Stadium - Akron, OH	1-10	Lisa Norris (6-6)	Lauren Haeger (5-7)	-	887
7/31/2015	**W Pennsylvania Rebellion** (11-29)	**L** Chicago Bandits (26-13)	The Ballpark at Rosemont - Rosemont, IL	4-2	Haylie Wagner (3-3)	Kirsten Verdun (3-1)	-	1625

August

Date	Visiting team	Home team	Venue	Score	Win	Loss	Save	Attendance
8/1/2015	**W Dallas Charge** (15-25)	**L** Akron Racers (19-20)	Berliner Park, Columbus, OH	1-0	Morgan Melloh (2-6)	Sarah Pauly (9-4)	-	1659
8/1/2015	**W Pennsylvania Rebellion** (12-29)	**L** Chicago Bandits (26-15)	Berliner Park, Columbus OH	5-3	Miranda Kramer (1-3)	Michelle Gascoigne (4-5)	Emily Weiman (S3)	1687
8/2/2015	Pennsylvania Rebellion	Chicago Bandits	The Ballpark at Rosemont - Rosemont, IL	**Postponed (inclement weather)**(Makeup date:8/3/2015)				
8/3/2015	**L** Pennsylvania Rebellion (12-30)	**W Chicago Bandits** (27-15)	The Ballpark at Rosemont - Rosemont, IL	0-3	Monica Abbott (12-1); **No-hitter**	Haylie Wagner (3-4)	-	989
8/3/2015	**L** Dallas Charge (15-26)	**W USSSA Florida Pride** (31-13)	Constellation Field - Sugarland, TX	2-6	Cat Osterman (13-2)	Jolene Henderson (3-8)	-	2122
8/3/2015	**L** Akron Racers (19-21)	**W Chicago Bandits** (28-15)	The Ballpark at Rosemont - Rosemont, IL	3-4	Lacey Waldrop (3-4)	Hannah Campbell (0-3)	-	457
8/4/2015	**W Dallas Charge** (16-26)	**L** USSSA Florida Pride (31-14)	Constellation Field - Sugarland, TX	3-0	Morgan Melloh (3-6)	Keilani Ricketts (7-5)	-	2193
8/4/2015	**W Akron Racers** (20-21)	**L** Chicago Bandits (28-16)	The Ballpark at Rosemont - Rosemont, IL	4-2	Rachele Fico (3-3)	Sara Moulton (3-2)	Sarah Pauly (S2)	839
8/5/2015	**L** Akron Racers (20-22)	**W Chicago Bandits** (29-16)	The Ballpark at Rosemont - Rosemont, IL	2-8	Michelle Gascoigne (5-5)	Sarah Pauly (9-5)	-	1265
8/6/2015	**L** Dallas Charge (16-27)	**W USSSA Florida Pride** (32-14)	St. Mary's University	0-4	Chelsea Thomas (8-3)	Jolene Henderson (3-9)	-	
8/6/2015	**L** Dallas Charge (16-28)	**W USSSA Florida Pride** (33-14)	St. Mary's University	4-5	Jordan Taylor (2-1)	Morgan Melloh (3-7)	-	1050
8/7/2015; Doubleheader/ makeup game	**L** Akron Racers (20-23)	**W Pennsylvania Rebellion** (13-30)	Consol Energy Park - Washington, PA	1-9	Dagmar Bloeming (1-2)	Hannah Campbell (0-4)	-	
8/7/2015; Doubleheader/ makeup game	**L** Akron Racers (20-24)	**W Pennsylvania Rebellion** (14-30)	Consol Energy Park - Washington, PA	3-4	Emma Johnson (4-2)	Rachele Fico (3-4)	Haylie Wagner (S3)	842
8/7/2015	**W USSSA Florida Pride** (33-14)	**L** Dallas Charge (16-29)	St. Mary's University	7-3	Cat Osterman (14-2)	Morgan Melloh (3-8)	Andi Williamson (S1)	1400
8/8/2015	**W Akron Racers** (21-24)	**L** Pennsylvania Rebellion (14-31)	Consol Energy Park - Washington, PA	6-0	Sarah Pauly (10-5)	Miranda Kramer (1-4)	-	996
8/9/2015	**W Akron Racers** (22-24)	**L** Pennsylvania Rebellion (14-32)	Consol Energy Park - Washington, PA	2-0	Lisa Norris (7-6)	Dallas Escobedo (2-9)	-	783
8/9/2015	**W Chicago Bandits** (30-16)	**L** Dallas Charge (16-30)	The Ballfields at Craig Ranch - McKinney, TX	3-0	Monica Abbott (13-1)	Jolene Henderson (3-10)	-	488
8/10/2015	**L** Chicago Bandits (30-17)	**W Dallas Charge** (17-30)	The Ballfields at Craig Ranch - McKinney, TX	0-3	Lauren Haeger (6-7)	Lacey Waldrop (3-5)	-	458
8/10/2015	**W Pennsylvania Rebellion** (15-32)	**L** Akron Racers (22-25)	Firestone Stadium - Akron, OH	9-5	Emily Weiman (2-7)	Rachele Fico (3-5)	-	1152
8/11/2015	**W Chicago Bandits** (31-17)	**L** Dallas Charge (17-31)	The Ballfields at Craig Ranch - McKinney, TX	4-3	Michelle Gascoigne (6-5)	Vanessa Stokes (5-3)	Monica Abbott (S1)	436
8/11/2015	**W Pennsylvania Rebellion** (16-32)	**L** Akron Racers (22-26)	Firestone Stadium - Akron, OH	13-8 (6 innings, rain shortened)	Miranda Kramer (2-4)	Hannah Campbell (0-5)	-	1813

== NPF Championship ==
Logo for the 2015 NPF Championship Series

The 2015 NPF Championship was scheduled to be played at Hoover Metropolitan Stadium in Hoover, AL beginning August 15. This is the second time Hoover has hosted the championship. The top four teams from the regular season qualify for the championship playoffs. The highest-seeded semifinal winner then hosted the championship final.

NPF Semifinals
1	USSSA Florida Pride	2
4	Dallas Charge	0
2	Chicago Bandits	2
3	Akron Racers	0

NPF Championship
1	USSSA Florida Pride	0
2	Chicago Bandits	2

2015 NPF Semifinals USSSA Pride defeat Dallas Charge, 2-0
Game	Date	Score	Series (USSSA–DAL)
1	Aug 14	USSSA Pride 8, Dallas Charge 0	1-0
2	Aug 15	USSSA Pride 8, Dallas Charge 7	2-0

2015 NPF Semifinals Chicago Bandits defeat Akron Racers, 2-0
Game	Date	Score	Series (CHI-AKR)
1	Aug 14	Chicago Bandits 3, Akron Racers 1	1-0
2	Aug 15	Chicago Bandits 5, Akron Racers 2	2-0

2015 NPF Championship Series Chicago Bandits defeat USSSA Pride, 2-0
Game	Date	Score	Series (CHI–USSSA)
1	Aug 16	Chicago Bandits 1, USSSA Pride 0	1-0
2	Aug 17	Chicago Bandits 1, USSSA Pride 0	2-0

=== Championship Game ===
Team	Top Batter	Stats.
Chicago Bandits	Emily Allard	2-2
USSSA Pride	Natasha Watley	1-2 BB

Team	Pitcher	IP	H	R	ER	BB	SO
Chicago Bandits	Monica Abbott (W)	7.0	2	0	0	1	8
USSSA Pride	Cat Osterman (L)	6.0	4	1	0	1	6

2015 NPF Championship Series MVP
Player	Club	Stats.
Monica Abbott	Chicago Bandits	3-0 26Ks 0.32 ERA 2SH 0.54 WHIP (7Hs+5BBs/22.0 IP)

== Statistical leaders ==
Batting avg

Player (Team)	Total
Natasha Watley (USSSA Pride)	.390
Brittany Cervantes (Chicago Bandits)	.358
Jill Barrett (Akron Racers)	.339
Kelly Kretschman (USSSA Pride)	.338
Amber Patton (Chicago Bandits)	.338

Slugging pct

Player (Team)	Total
Brittany Cervantes (Chicago Bandits)	.670
Nerissa Myers (Akron Racers)	.556
Taylor Schlopy(Akron Racers)	.530
Kelly Kretschman (USSSA Pride)	.521
Shelby Pendley(USSSA Pride)	.519

On base pct

Player (Team)	Total
Brittany Cervantes (Chicago Bandits)	.507
Nerissa Myers (Akron Racers)	.443
Natasha Watley (USSSA Pride)	.438
Taylor Schlopy(Akron Racers)	.416
Kristyn Sandberg (Pennsylvania Rebellion)	.402

Runs scored

Player (Team)	Total
Taylor Schlopy(Akron Racers)	34
Brittany Cervantes (Chicago Bandits)	26
Jill Barrett (Akron Racers)	26
Kelly Kretschman (USSSA Pride)	24
2 tied at 23

Hits

Player (Team)	Total
Jill Barrett (Akron Racers)	56
Emily Allard (Chicago Bandits)	51
Kelly Kretschman (USSSA Pride)	48
Amber Patton (Chicago Bandits)	48
Natasha Watley (USSSA Pride)	46

Runs batted in

Player (Team)	Total
Nerissa Myers (Akron Racers)	31
Megan Wiggins (USSSA Pride)	29
Taylor Edwards (Chicago Bandits)	29
Andrea Duran (USSSA Pride)	26
Taylor Schlopy(Akron Racers)	26

Home runs

Player (Team)	Total
Taylor Schlopy(Akron Racers)	10
Nerissa Myers (Akron Racers)	9
Taylor Edwards (Chicago Bandits)	9
Brittany Cervantes (Chicago Bandits)	9
2 tied at 7

Stolen bases

Player (Team)	Total
Emily Allard (Chicago Bandits)	12
Kelly Kretschman (USSSA Pride)	10
Danielle Zymkowitz (Chicago Bandits)	8
Kahley Novak (Dallas Charge)	7
AJ Andrews (Chicago Bandits)	7

Earned run avg

Player (Team)	Total
Monica Abbott (Chicago Bandits)	0.31
Jordan Taylor (USSSA Pride)	0.51
Cat Osterman (USSSA Pride)	1.35
Kirsten Verdun (Chicago Bandits)	1.52
Chelsea Thomas (USSSA Pride)	1.73

Batters struck out

Player (Team)	Total
Cat Osterman (USSSA Pride)	164
Monica Abbott (Chicago Bandits)	149
Lauren Haeger (Dallas Charge)	86
Keilani Ricketts (USSSA Pride)	83
Sarah Pauly (Akron Racers)	68

Wins

Player (Team)	Total
Cat Osterman (USSSA Pride)	14
Monica Abbott (Chicago Bandits)	13
Sarah Pauly (Akron Racers)	10
Chelsea Thomas (USSSA Pride)	8
2 tied at 7

Saves

Player (Team)	Total
Jordan Taylor (USSSA Pride)	11
Emily Weiman (Pennsylvania Rebellion)	3
Haylie Wagner (Pennsylvania Rebellion)	3
Sarah Pauly (Akron Racers)	2
10 tied at 1

Losses

Player (Team)	Total
Jolene Henderson (Dallas Charge)	10
Dallas Escobedo (Pennsylvania Rebellion)	9
Morgan Melloh (Dallas Charge)	8
Emily Weiman (Pennsylvania Rebellion)	7
Lauren Haeger (Dallas Charge)	7

== Annual awards ==
The 2015 NPF Awards Banquet was held at the Hyatt Regency Wynfrey Hotel in Hoover, Alabama on August 13. The annual awards were presented, and the 2015 All-NPF Team was announced.

Award	Player	Team	Stat
Player of the Year Award	Kelly Kretschman	USSSA Florida Pride	hit .338 with 7 HR, and 22 RBIs, made only one error, 10 for 10 in stolen bases
Pitcher of the Year	Monica Abbott	Chicago Bandits	13-1, 1 SV, 12 complete games and 11 shutouts, 1 no-hitter, 1 perfect game, 146 Ks in 90.1 IP
Rookie of the Year	Shelby Pendley	USSSA Florida Pride	led all rookies in SLG, hits, HR, OBP, RBIs, total bases, and runs; ranked second among rookies in batting average and doubles.
Offensive Player of the Year	Brittany Cervantes	Chicago Bandits	hit .358 and led the league in SLG and OBP.
Defensive Player of the Year	Courtney Senas	Pennsylvania Rebellion	.964 fielding percentage with 49 put outs and four assists, the most by an outfielder
Home Run Award	Taylor Schlopy	Akron Racers	10 HR
Rally Spikes Award (Note: The Rally Spikes Award is given to the player with the most stolen bases)	Emily Allard	Chicago Bandits	12 SB
NPF Trophy (Note: The NPF Trophy is awarded to the team with the best regular season record.)	USSSA Florida Pride		
Coaching Staff of the Year	Dallas Charge Head Coach Jennifer McFalls and Assistant Coaches Chez Sievers and Michelle Gromacki		
Jennie Finch Award (Note: The Jennie Finch award is given to the player who best exemplifies the character and qualities of its famous namesake, and who is considered to positively impact the game both on and off the field.)	Cat Osterman	USSSA Florida Pride	

== All-NPF Team ==
2015 All-NPF Team
Position	Name	Team
Pitcher	Monica Abbott	Chicago Bandits
Pitcher	Cat Osterman	USSSA Florida Pride
Pitcher	Jordan Taylor	USSSA Florida Pride
Pitcher	Sarah Pauly	Akron Racers
Catcher	Taylor Edwards	Chicago Bandits
1st Base	Kaitlyn Richardson	Dallas Charge
2nd Base	Shelby Pendley	USSSA Florida Pride
3rd Base	Andrea Duran	USSSA Florida Pride
Shortstop	Jill Barrett	Akron Racers
Outfield	Kelly Kretschman	USSSA Florida Pride
Outfield	Taylor Schlopy	Akron Racers
Outfield	Natasha Watley	USSSA Florida Pride
At-Large	Brittany Cervantes	Chicago Bandits
At-Large	Kelley Montalvo	Akron Racers
At-Large	Amber Patton	Chicago Bandits
At-Large	Kristyn Sandberg	Pennsylvania Rebellion
At-Large	Megan Wiggins	USSSA Florida Pride
At-Large	Tammy Williams	Chicago Bandits

== See also ==
- List of professional sports leagues
- List of professional sports teams in the United States and Canada
