= 2014 National Pro Fastpitch season =

2014 NPF Season
- League: National Pro Fastpitch
- Sport: softball
- Duration: May 30, 2014 – August 17, 2014
- Teams: 4
- TV partner: CBS Sports Network

2014 NPF Draft
- Top draft pick: Dallas Escobedo P Arizona State
- Picked by: Pennsylvania Rebellion

Regular Season
- Ringor Cup (Best record): USSSA Pride

Cowles Cup
- Champions: USSSA Pride
- Runners-up: Akron Racers
- Finals MVP: Cat Osterman; USSSA Pride

NPF seasons
- ← 2013 2015 →

The 2014 National Pro Fastpitch season was the 11th season of professional softball under the name National Pro Fastpitch (NPF) for the only professional women's softball league in the United States. From 1997 to 2002, NPF operated under the names Women's Pro Fastpitch (WPF) and Women's Pro Softball League (WPSL). Each year, the playoff teams battle for the Cowles Cup. Play began on May 30 in Salisbury, Maryland, between the Pennsylvania Rebellion and the USSSA Pride.

== Milestones and events ==
The NY/NJ Comets did not play in 2014, and their roster and draft positions were inherited by an expansion team, Pennsylvania Rebellion. The Rebellion played home games in Washington, Pennsylvania in Consol Energy Park.

NPF reached a deal with CBS Sports Network to broadcast selected regular season games and selected postseason games for the 2014 season.

=== Rule changes ===
At its owners' meetings, NPF announced a number of changes in policies and game rules:

Game rules:

- Voted to keep the International Tie Breaker during regular season play. The tie breaker will continue to be implemented in the top of the 10th inning. This effectively reverses a change announced in 2013.
- Voted to reject a "Run Rule" that would end the game after 5 innings (4 1/2 if home team was ahead) if a team led by 12 or more runs
- Voted to implement a "90 second" clock between innings. After the clock expires, umpires will assign a ball on the batter for "delay of game".
- Voted to revise the number of defensive conferences from one per inning to three per game. In extra innings, teams will be given one additional conference per inning. Violation will result in ejection of the head coach.
- Committee voted to eliminate a former revision, and essentially gives the pitcher 25 seconds to get in place on the rubber, take the sign and deliver the pitch.

Policies and procedures:

- Voted to eliminate the Disabled List
- Voted to increase the maximum roster limit from 20 to 23 (Salary cap did not increase)
- Voted to increase the minimum roster limit from 14 to 18.
- Voted for a 45-minute autograph session following all games except double headers. The session is mandatory for all players.
- Voted for a ticket policy that would allow fifty complementary tickets total (between both teams) per game. The Home Team will be given first choice with a 2 ticket per player allowance with the remaining tickets (if any) offered to the Visiting Team. It is at the discretion of the Home Team whether to make discounted tickets available to Visiting Team Players.
- Voted for a new payment structure for umpires in the event a game is split in its completion either due to weather or other reason.
- Voted to re-structure of the umpire assignment and evaluation system for the league.
- Voted for a contract with the company "Game Changer" to carry the complete stats of the NPF

Post season:

- Voted to require a minimum number of innings, plate appearances, or total games played, to be considered for post season award nominations and voting. Those minimums are: Defensive player nominees must have played a minimum of 75% of the total innings possible, at the position they are being nominated for. Utility will require the player to have played in 75% of total innings possible, but with no stipulation on position. Offensive player nominees must have 75% of total plate appearances possible based on their team statistics. There are no minimum criteria for the nominations of pitchers into any category that would pertain to the position of pitching.
- Voted to change the Championship Series format back to that used from 2010–2012. The top 4 league teams, according to regular season finish, advance to the Championship Series. Those 4 teams play three series of "best-of-three" match-ups. The #1 seed will play the #4 seed in a best-of-three series and the #2 seed will play the #3 seed in a best-of-three series, with both winners advancing to the Final Series. Those two winners will then compete in a best-of-three series to determine the Cowles Cup Champion. This format will add one day to the competition from the 2013 structure.

== Teams, cities and stadiums ==
Team	City	Stadium
Akron Racers	Akron, Ohio	Firestone Stadium
Chicago Bandits	Rosemont, Illinois (Chicago Area)	Ballpark at Rosemont
Pennsylvania Rebellion	Washington, Pennsylvania	Consol Energy Park
USSSA Florida Pride	Kissimmee, Florida	Osceola County Stadium and Champion Stadium

National Pro Fastpitch teams

== Player acquisition ==
=== College draft ===
The 2014 NPF College Draft was held on March 31 in Nashville, Tennessee at 8:00 pm EST at the Ford Theatre located inside the Country Music Hall of Fame and Museum. Pitcher Dallas Escobedo of Arizona State was selected first by Pennsylvania Rebellion.

== Standings ==
Teams	W	L	Pct.	GB
USSSA Pride	33	15	.688	—
Chicago Bandits	30	18	.625	3
Akron Racers	24	24	.500	9
Pennsylvania Rebellion	9	39	.188	24

== NPF Championship Series ==

The top four teams from the regular season qualify for the championship playoffs. The highest-seeded semifinal winner then hosted the championship final.

NPF Semifinals
1	USSSA Pride	2
4	Pennsylvania Rebellion	0
2	Chicago Bandits	1
3	Akron Racers	2

NPF Championship
1	USSSA Pride	2
3	Akron Racers	0

2014 NPF Semifinals USSSA Pride defeat Pennsylvania Rebellion 2–0
Game	Date	Score	Series (USSSA–PA)	Location
1	August 20	USSSA Pride 6, Pennsylvania Rebellion 0	1–0	Hoover, Alabama
2	August 21	USSSA Pride 3, Pennsylvania Rebellion 2	2–0	Hoover, Alabama

2014 NPF Semifinals Akron Racers defeat Chicago Bandits 2–1
Game	Date	Score	Series (AKR–CHI)	Location
1	August 20	Akron Racers 2, Chicago Bandits 1	1–0	Hoover, Alabama
2	August 21	Chicago Bandits 4, Akron Racers 1	1–1	Hoover, Alabama
3	August 22	Akron Racers 1, Chicago Bandits 0	2–1	Hoover, Alabama

2014 NPF Championship Series USSSA Pride defeat Akron Racers 2–0
Game	Date	Score	Series (USSSA–AKR)	Location
1	August 22	USSSA Pride 6, Akron Racers 0	1–0	Hoover, Alabama
2	August 23	USSSA Pride 8, Akron Racers 3	2–0	Hoover, Alabama

=== Championship Game ===
Team	Top Batter	Stats.
USSSA Pride	Kelly Kretschman	1-3 2RBIs
Chicago Bandits	Jessica Garcia	2-3 2RBIs HR

Team	Pitcher	IP	H	R	ER	BB	SO
USSSA Pride	Keilani Ricketts	1.0	3	2	2	0	1
USSSA Pride	Danielle Lawrie (W)	6.0	3	1	0	0	3
Akron Racers	Lisa Norris (L)	5.0	6	7	6	1	3
Akron Racers	Alison Owen	0.1	2	1	0	0	0
Akron Racers	Hannah Campbell	1.2	0	0	0	0	0

2014 NPF Championship Series MVP
Player	Club	Stats.
Cat Osterman	USSSA Pride	2-0 20Ks 0.00 ERA SH 0.46 WHIP (4Hs+2BBs/13.0 IP)

== League leaders ==
Final totals

=== Batting leaders ===
Stat	Player	Total
AVG	Natasha Watley (USSSA)	.403
HR	Brittany Cervantes (CHI)	12
RBI	Nerissa Myers (AKR)	43
R	Emily Allard (CHI)	35
H	Emily Allard (CHI)	57
SB	Brejae Washington (USSSA)	17

=== Pitching leaders ===
Stat	Player	Total
W	Cat Osterman (USSSA)	16
L	Dallas Escobedo (PA); Sarah Pauly (PA)	11
ERA	Cat Osterman (USSSA)	0.56
K	Cat Osterman (USSSA)	160
IP	Rachele Fico (AKR)	106
SV	Jordan Taylor (USSSA)	3

== Annual awards ==
Award	Player	Team	Stat
Player of the Year Award	Andrea Duran	USSSA Pride	.362 batting average, 47 hits, 26 RBI, 7 doubles, one triple and two homeruns. Led the league in OBP (.478) and walks (27)
Pitcher of the Year	Cat Osterman	USSSA Pride	led the league with 160 Ks and 0.560 ERA. Undefeated at 16 – 0 and threw a no-hitter on July 5, 2014.
Rookie of the Year	Madison Shipman	USSSA Pride	.344 BA, 28 RBI and 5 HR. Led the league in doubles.
Defensive Player of the Year	Tammy Williams	Chicago Bandits	
Offensive Player of the Year	Nerissa Myers	Akron Racers	50 H, 5 2B, 9 HR, 6 SB, .474 OBP. Lead the league in RBI (43), 2 out-RBI's (19), and slugging % (.599).
Home Run Award	Brittany Cervantes	Chicago Bandits	12 HR
Diamond Spike (Note: The Diamond Spike Award is given to the player with the most stolen bases)	Brejae Washington	USSSA Pride	17 SB
Coaching Staff of the Year	Akron Racers -- Brian Levin (HEAD COACH) and Dustin Combs (ASSISTANT COACH)		
Jennie Finch Award (Note: The Jennie Finch award is given to the player who best exemplifies the character and qualities of its famous namesake, and who is considered to positively impact the game both on and off the field.)	Kelley Montalvo	Akron Racers	

2014 All-NPF Team
Position	Name	Team
Pitcher	Cat Osterman	USSSA Pride
Pitcher	Monica Abbott	Chicago Bandits
Pitcher	Rachele Fico	Akron Racers
Pitcher	Michelle Gascoigne	Chicago Bandits
Catcher	Kristen Butler	Chicago Bandits
1st Base	Brittany Cervantes	Chicago Bandits
2nd Base	Lauren Lappin	Pennsylvania Rebellion
3rd Base	Andrea Duran	USSSA Pride
Shortstop	Tammy Williams	Chicago Bandits
Outfield	Caitlin Lowe	USSSA Pride
Outfield	Natasha Watley	USSSA Pride
Outfield(tie)	Megan Wiggins	Chicago Bandits
Outfield(tie)	Emily Allard	Chicago Bandits
At-Large	Nerissa Myers	Akron Racers
At-Large	Madison Shipman	USSSA Pride
At-Large	Sarah Pauly	Pennsylvania Rebellion
At-Large	Kelley Montalvo	Akron Racers
At-Large	Ashley Thomas	Akron Racers
At-Large	Jill Barrett	Akron Racers

NPF Championship Series MVP
Player	Club	Record
Cat Osterman	USSSA Pride	threw a complete-game shutout with 12 strikeouts in game 1. Her 3rd Championship MVP

== See also ==
- List of professional sports leagues
- List of professional sports teams in the United States and Canada
