= 2015 NPF Draft =

2015 NPF College Draft

General information
- Sport: Softball
- Date: April 1, 2015
- Time: 5:30 pm CST
- Location: Nashville, Tennessee
- Network: CBS Sports Network

Overview
- 33 selections, 1 Market Selection total selections
- League: National Pro Fastpitch
- Teams: 5
- First selection: Lauren Chamberlain 1B Oklahoma selected by USSSA Florida Pride
- Most selections: Dallas Charge, 10 draft picks, 1 market pick
- Fewest selections: Akron Racers, 4

The 2015 NPF College Draft is the twelfth annual collegiate draft for NPF, and was held on Wednesday, April 1, 2015, 5:30 pm CST at the CMA Theater in the Country Music Hall of Fame and Museum in Nashville, Tennessee. Draft order was determined by regular season standings from 2014, but subsequent trades and transactions altered the overall draft order. The draft was broadcast live on CBS Sports Network.

== The Draft ==
With the addition of the Dallas Charge, a league expansion team in 2015, the Draft added a 6th round and four additional bonus selections for Dallas. Dallas was given bonus selections in the fourth and sixth rounds for a total of 10 selections. The additional round and selections will total 34 overall picks in the 2015 Draft. However, Dallas chose to exercise a previous option offered to them, and made a “Market Choice Selection.” Exercising their Market Choice Selection allowed Dallas Charge to choose a player either originally from the state of Texas or who played college softball for a Texas school. Exercising the Market Choice Selection reduced the overall number of Draft picks for Dallas to nine instead of the original ten. The 34th was replaced by the Market Choice Selection by Dallas. A trade of draft picks with the USSSA Pride brought Dallas' total back to ten draft selections.

Drafting an athlete gives an NPF affiliate team the rights to that athlete for two full seasons.

=== Draft selections ===
Position key:
C = catcher; INF = infielder; SS = shortstop; OF = outfielder; UT = Utility infielder; P = pitcher; RHP = right-handed pitcher; LHP = left-handed pitcher
Positions will be listed as combined for those who can play multiple positions.

^{+}	Denotes player who has been selected to at least one All-NPF team
^{#}	Denotes player who has not played in the NPF

==== Round 1 ====
Pick	Player	Pos.	NPF Team	College
1	Lauren Chamberlain^{+}	1B	USSSA Florida Pride (Note: Pennsylvania Rebellion → USSSA Pride 3 March 2014: Pennsylvania Rebellion traded their first-round pick to USSSA Florida Pride for P Sarah Pauly, INFs Jenn Salling and Lauren Lappin and OF Nikia Williams.)	Oklahoma
2	Shelby Pendley^{+}	INF	USSSA Florida Pride (Note: Akron Racers → USSSA Pride 19 March 2014: Akron Racers traded their 2015 first-round pick to USSSA Florida Pride for the Pride's third overall selection in the 2014 NPF Draft.)	Oklahoma
3	Lacey Waldrop	RHP	Chicago Bandits	Florida State
4	Danielle Henderson	3B/C	Dallas Charge (Note: USSSA Florida Pride → Dallas Charge 17 March 2015: USSSA Florida Pride traded 2015 4th overall draft pick for the Dallas Charge 2016 first round draft pick)	California
5	Kaitlyn Richardson^{+}	UT	Dallas Charge	Minnesota

==== Round 2 ====
Pick	Player	Pos.	NPF Team	College
6	Miranda Kramer	LHP	Pennsylvania Rebellion (Note: USSSA Florida Pride → Pennsylvania Rebellion 19 January 2015: USSSA Florida Pride traded SS Kristyn Sandberg along with the 6th overall and 14th overall picks in 2015 NPF Draft to the Pennsylvania Rebellion in exchange for OF Megan Wiggins and the 11th overall pick in 2015 NPF Draft.)	Western Kentucky
7	AJ Andrews ^{+}	OF	Chicago Bandits	LSU
8	Shelby Davis^{#}	OF	Pennsylvania Rebellion (Note: Akron Racers → Pennsylvania Rebellion 27 January 2015: Pennsylvania Rebellion traded RHP Sarah Pauly to the Akron Racers for the Racers #8 Overall Pick in the 2015 NPF Draft and the Racers 3rd Round Pick in the 2016 NPF Draft.)	Oklahoma State
9	Maddie O'Brien	SS	Pennsylvania Rebellion	Florida State
10	Kylee Lahners	INF/OF	Dallas Charge	Washington

==== Round 3 ====
Pick	Player	Pos.	NPF Team	College
11	Amber Freeman	C	USSSA Florida Pride (Note: USSSA Pride → Pennsylvania Rebellion 19 January 2015: USSSA Florida Pride traded SS Kristyn Sandberg along with the 6th overall and 14th overall picks in 2015 NPF Draft to the Pennsylvania Rebellion in exchange for OF Megan Wiggins and the 11th overall pick in 2015 NPF Draft.)	Arizona State
12	Morgan Estell ^{#}	OF/1B	Akron Racers	Auburn
13	Brenna Moss^{+}	OF	Chicago Bandits	Fresno State
14	Cheyenne Cordes	IF	Pennsylvania Rebellion (Note: USSSA Florida Pride → Pennsylvania Rebellion 19 January 2015: USSSA Florida Pride traded SS Kristyn Sandberg along with the 6th overall and 14th overall picks in 2015 NPF Draft to the Pennsylvania Rebellion in exchange for OF Megan Wiggins and the 11th overall pick in 2015 NPF Draft.)	California
15	Ashley Burkhardt	IF	Dallas Charge	Purdue

==== Round 4 ====
Pick	Player	Pos.	NPF Team	College
Market Pick	Renada Davis	SS	Dallas Charge (Note: Market Choice Selection 30 March 2015: Exercising their Market Choice Selection allowed Dallas Charge to choose a player either originally from the state of Texas or who played college softball for a Texas school.)	NC State
16	Kahley Novak	SS/2B	Dallas Charge	UCF
17	Emilee Koerner	OF	USSSA Florida Pride	Notre Dame
18	Sammy Marshall^{+}	SS	Chicago Bandits	Western Illinois
19	Griffin Joiner^{+}	C	Akron Racers	Kentucky
20	Devon Wallace^{#}	UT	Pennsylvania Rebellion	Arkansas
21	Lauren Haeger^{+}	RHP/1B	Dallas Charge	Florida

==== Round 5 ====
Pick	Player	Pos.	NPF Team	College
22	Emily Weiman	RHP	Pennsylvania Rebellion	NC State
23	Shellie Robinson^{+}	OF	Akron Racers	USC Upstate
24	Branndi Melero	OF	Chicago Bandits	Auburn
25	Emma Johnson	RHP	Pennsylvania Rebellion (Note: USSSA Pride → Pennsylvania Rebellion 27 January 2015: USSSA Florida Pride traded OF Alexa Peterson and the 25th overall 2015 NPF Draft pick to the Pennsylvania Rebellion for the rights to RHP Andi Williamson.)	Kent State
26	Janie Takeda^{#}	OF	Dallas Charge	Oregon

==== Round 6 ====
Pick	Player	Pos.	NPF Team	College
27	Ally Carda (Note: Carda did not join the Charge until the 2017 season.)	RHP/UT	Dallas Charge	UCLA
28	Hallie Wilson^{+}	UT	USSSA Florida Pride	Arizona
29	Stephany LaRosa^{#}	C	Chicago Bandits	UCLA
30	Megan Low	C/INF	Akron Racers	UTSA
31	Amber Parrish	C/INF	Pennsylvania Rebellion	North Carolina
32	Kaitlyn Thumann^{#}	OF	Dallas Charge	Baylor
33	Farish Beard^{#}	P	Dallas Charge	South Alabama

==== Draft notes ====
Round 1:

Round 2:

Round 3:

Round 4:

Round 5:
