= Kylee Lahners =

American baseball player (born 1993)

New York Heights – No. 22
- Third baseman
- Born: February 2, 1993 (age 33); Berkeley, California, U.S.
- Bats: Right Throws: Right

WPBL statistics (through September 4, 2026)
- Batting average: .313
- Home runs: 2
- Runs batted in: 14
- Stats at Baseball Reference

Teams
- University of Washington (2012–2015); Texas Charge (2015-2017); New York Heights (2026–present)
Medals
Women's baseball
Representing United States
Women's Baseball World Cup
Silver medal – second place	2024 Canada	Team competition

Kylee Suzanne Lahners (born February 2, 1993) is an American professional baseball third baseman for the New York Heights of the Women's Pro Baseball League. She has also played for the United States women's national baseball team in international competition since 2018. Lahners played college softball for the Washington Huskies and professional softball for the Texas Charge of National Pro Fastpitch. She was the third overall pick in the inaugural Women's Pro Baseball League draft in 2025.

== Early life ==
Lahners grew up in Laguna Hills, California. Her parents are Ken and JoAnn Lahners, and she has one sister, Sydney. Ken played baseball at USC.

== Softball career ==
Lahners was a 2010 USA Jr. National Team Member, where she won a gold medal at the Pan-American Games. She was also a 2010 ESPN Rise All-American, Under Armour All-American, and the 2010 Under Armour All-American Game MVP.

=== University of Washington ===
Lahners played softball for the University of Washington from 2012 to 2015. She was named an All-American in 2014, was All-Region three times, and was named to the All-Pac-12 Team all four of her years, including two First Team honors. Lahners is fourth all-time at Washington in home runs and walks, fifth in slugging percentage, and 11th in on-base percentage. She is one of only five Huskies ever to record multiple 15-homer seasons, knocking 16 in 2015 and 17 in 2014.

=== Dallas Charge ===
Lahners was selected in the second round, tenth overall, by the Dallas Charge in the 2015 National Pro Fastpitch Draft. She played for the team for three years.

== Baseball career ==
=== USA Baseball ===
In 2018, Lahners transitioned from softball to baseball and joined the United States women's national baseball team. She made four starts at third base in the 2018 Women's Baseball World Cup. In 2019, she started at third base in all seven games of the COPABE Women's Pan-American Championships, batted .625, and led the team in doubles (6) and was second in RBIs (17) She earned the tournament award for most runs produced after scoring 15 and collecting 17 RBIs and was named to the All-Tournament team. In 2022, she started all five games at third base and helped the U.S. win its friendship series over Canada. In 2024, she played in four games and batted at a .750 clip.

=== New York Heights ===
In the inaugural WPBL draft, Lahners was selected third overall by the New York Heights.

== Personal life ==
Lahners married Mandee Farish in 2023. Their son was born in 2024.

== Statistics ==
=== Softball ===
Team	League	YEAR	G	AB	R	H	BA	RBI	HR	3B	2B	SLG	BB	SO	SB
University of Washington	Pac-12	2012	58	155	22	42	.271	36	11	0	6	.523%	20	28	2
University of Washington	Pac-12	2013	60	169	36	50	.296	44	10	0	7	.515%	29	32	2
University of Washington	Pac-12	2014	52	154	37	54	.351	59	16	0	11	.734%	24	26	2
University of Washington	Pac-12	2015	58	166	60	64	.386	50	16	1	14	.771%	54	29	5
University of Washington	Pac-12	TOTALS	228	644	155	210	.326	189	53	1	38	.635	127	115	11
Dallas Charge	NPF	2015	23	48		10	.208	3	1				6	18	
Dallas Charge	NPF	2016	46	139		34	.245	28	8				9	33	
Dallas Charge	NPF	2017	45	74		11	.149	9	2				6	21	
Dallas Charge	NPF	TOTALS	114	261		55	.211	40	11				21	72	

=== Baseball ===
YEAR	G	AB	R	H	BA	RBI	HR	3B	2B	TB	SLG	SB
2018	6	11	2	4	.364	0	0	0	1	5	.455%	0
2019	7	24	15	15	.625	17	1	0	6	24	1.000%	1
2022	5	15	4	4	.267	4	0	0	1	5	.333%	0
2023	2	1	2	0	.000	1	0	0	0	0	.000%	0
2024	4	5	1	3	.600	0	0	0	1	4	.800%	0
2026	5	7	2	1	.143	5	1	0	0	4	.571%	0
TOTALS	29	63	26	27	.333	27	2	0	9	42	.527%	2

== See also ==
- Women in baseball
