= Dallas Escobedo =

American softball player and coach

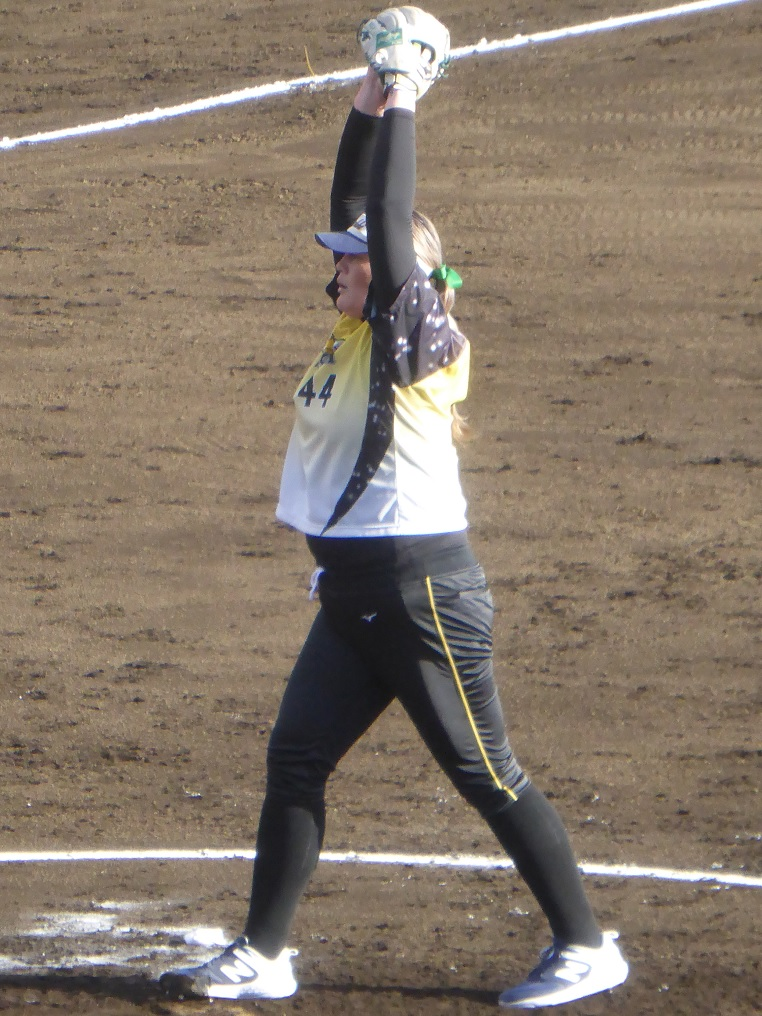

Current position
- Title: Pitching coach
- Team: Cal State Fullerton
- Conference: Big West

Biographical details
- Born: April 12, 1992 (age 34); Phoenix, Arizona, U.S.

Playing career
- 2011–2014: Arizona State
- 2014–2016: Pennsylvania Rebellion
- 2017: Texas Charge
- 2018–present: Scrap Yard Fast Pitch
- 2019–present: Toyota Industries Shining Vega
- Position: Pitcher

Coaching career (HC unless noted)
- 2015–2017: Arizona State (grad. asst.)
- 2018–present: Cal State Fullerton (pitching)

Accomplishments and honors

Championships
- As player: Women's College World Series (2011); As assistant coach: Big West (2018)

Awards
- Women's College World Series Most Outstanding Player (2011); 3× NFCA first-team All-West Region (2011–2013); NFCA first-team All-American (2011); NFCA second-team All-American (2013); 4× first-team All-Pac-10/12 (2011–2014); Pac-10 Freshman of the Year (2011)

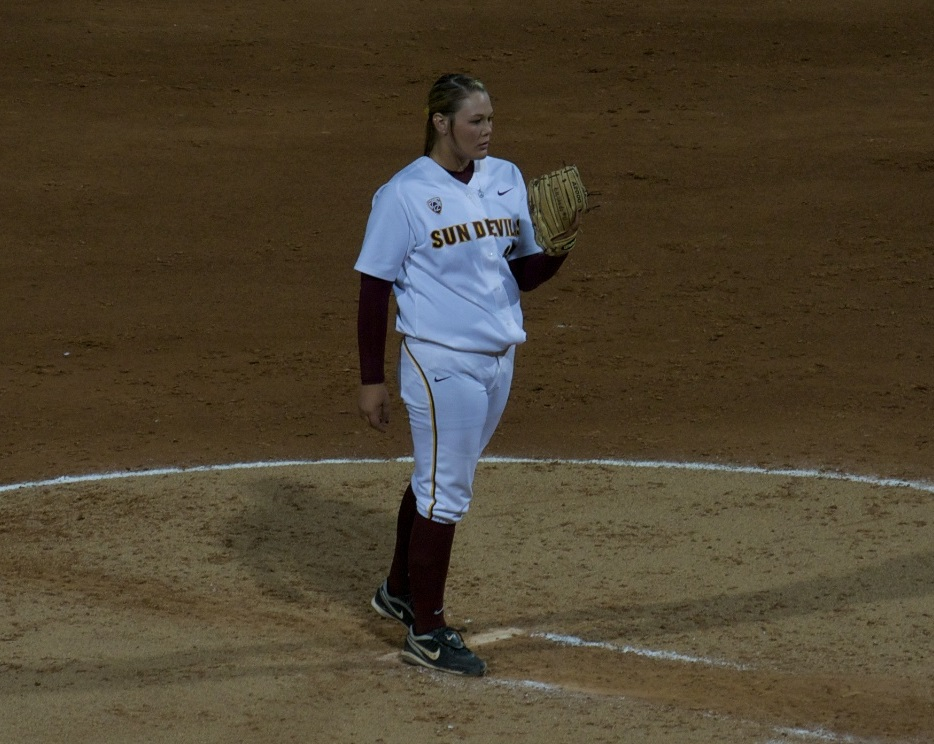
Escobedo with the Arizona State Sun Devils during the 2013 NCAA Tournament

Dallas Jade Escobedo (born April 12, 1992) is a Mexican-American, former collegiate All-American, Olympian, professional softball pitcher and coach. She played college softball for Arizona State in the from 2011 to 2014, where she led them to the 2011 Women's College World Series title and ranks in several pitching categories for both institutions. She is currently the pitching coach at Cal State Fullerton.

Escobedo was selected first overall by the Pennsylvania Rebellion in the 2014 NPF Draft. She played for the Rebellion from 2014 to 2016 and the Texas Charge in 2017, currently ranking in career strikeout ratio for the league. She played softball for both Team USA and Team Mexico. She helped Team Mexico place fourth at the 2020 Summer Olympics.

== Early life and education ==
Escobedo is the daughter of Richard Escobedo and Jodi Goch, and has three siblings. She attended St. Mary's High School in Phoenix, Arizona from 2006 to 2010, and won letters in softball and basketball. She pitched for the school's softball team, the Knights, was captain of the team for two seasons, and in 2010 led her team to the State Championship as well as the championship of the MaxPreps Tournament. That year she was named Softball Player of the Year by the Varsity Extra Tribune. She then attended Arizona State University majoring in special education and continuing to play softball from 2011 to 2014.

== College career ==
In 2011, Dallas played for the USA Softball Women's Junior Team, which won the gold medal at the Pan American Championships.

At Arizona State University she was the starting pitcher for the Sun Devils in her freshman year and helped lead the Sun Devils to the 2011 NCAA Division I national softball title. She also played with the Sun Devils as the team went to the Women's College World Series her sophomore and junior year. She was chosen for the WCWS All-Tournament Team and was voted WCWS co-Most Outstanding Player.

She finished her Sun Devil career with a 115-26 win–loss record and a total of 1,222 strikeouts.

== Professional career ==
Dallas Escobedo was the National Pro Fastpitch No. 1 draft pick in 2014. She joined the Pennsylvania Rebellion and helped give the team their first victory in June 2014. That season she pitched 69 innings in 16 games.

Escobedo pitched for Mexico in the 2016 Women's Softball World Championship.

On December 20, 2017, Escobedo signed a five-year contract with the Scrap Yard Dawgs. About a month later, the Dawgs left NPF and renamed as Scrap Yard Fast Pitch.

== Team Mexico ==
At the Tokyo games, Escobedo went 2–2 for Team Mexico, tossing 20.0 innings and giving up 15 hits, 8 walks and 7 earned runs to finish with a 2.45 ERA and 1.15 WHIP, with 13 strikeouts. Escobedo was the historic first pitcher in the first game for Mexico in the Olympics when the softball tournament opened on July 20 and also earned their first win on July 25, 2021. Mexico lost the Bronze medal game on July 27 to place fourth, Escobedo did not play.

== Coaching career ==
From 2015 to 2017, Escobedo was a graduate assistant at Arizona State. On August 16, 2017, Escobedo became pitching coach at Cal State Fullerton. In her first season on staff, Cal State Fullerton won the 2018 Big West Conference championship with an automatic bid to the NCAA Tournament and qualified for the regional final after an upset win over regional host UCLA.

== Career statistics ==
YEAR	W	L	GP	GS	CG	SHO	SV	IP	H	R	ER	BB	SO	ERA	WHIP
2011	37	3	50	38	35	13	5	255.1	153	58	55	97	324	1.51	0.98
2012	24	8	41	32	27	6	4	211.0	162	79	70	85	237	2.32	1.17
2013	30	6	45	37	24	8	2	250.2	172	95	82	74	325	2.29	0.98
2014	24	9	37	33	30	12	0	233.1	155	70	65	59	336	1.95	0.92
TOTALS	115	26	173	140	116	39	11	950.1	642	302	272	315	1222	2.00	1.00
