= Brittany Cervantes =

American softball player and coach

Personal information
- Born: July 3, 1990 (age 36)
- Height: 5 ft 9 in (175 cm)

Sport
- Country: Mexico
- Sport: Softball
- Position: Catcher

Brittany Marya Cervantes (born July 3, 1990) is an American softball catcher and coach of Mexican descent, and is currently the director of softball operations for Kentucky. She represented Mexico at the 2020 Summer Olympics.

== Early life ==
Cervantes attended high school at Chaminade College Preparatory School in Chatsworth, Los Angeles. She helped lead her school to two consecutive C.I.F championships.

== College career ==
Cervantes played college softball at Kentucky. In 2011, she hit 15 home runs, the second most homers in a season at Kentucky and scored 55 runs, the most in single-season history. The Wildcats reached the Super Regionals in the 2011 NCAA Division I softball tournament for the first time in program history. In 2012, she batted a team best .357 with 11 home runs and 23 RBI. She ranked among the top in the SEC with batting average, slugging percentage, on-base percentage, RBI, home runs and walks, and led the league in total bases. Following the season she was named to the All-SEC First Team and SEC All-Defensive Team. During her college career at Kentucky, she was the only player in program history to hit 10 or more homers in each of her four seasons. She also set single-season school records with 55 runs scored and 48 walks in 2011.

== Professional career ==
On June 2, 2012, Cervantes signed with the Chicago Bandits following open tryouts. She played with the Bandits for five seasons, and won two consecutive the Cowles Cup championships with the team in 2015 and 2016. She was named the NPF Offensive Player of the Year in 2015, where she hit .358 on the season and led the league in both slugging and on base percentage. In addition, she recorded 26 runs, nine home runs, 71 total bases, 30 walks and 23 RBI. During the 2016 NPF Championship, she batted over .500 in the playoffs with three homers and six RBI, and recorded a hit in all six games of the playoffs. She was subsequently named tournament MVP.

On January 27, 2016, she signed a one-year contract extension with the Bandits. On January 27, 2017, Cervantes was traded to the Scrap Yard Dawgs. She helped the Scrap Yard Dawgs win their first Cowles Cup in franchise history, and her third consecutive championship. In 2019 she played for USSSA Pride where she won her fourth NPF championship.

== Coaching career ==
In 2013, she served as volunteer assistant coach at Kentucky. She then served as assistant coach for Loyola University Chicago. In 2019 she was named director of softball operations at Kentucky.

== International career ==
She participated at the 2018 Women's Softball World Championship. She represented Mexico at the 2020 Summer Olympics and placed fourth in the tournament.
