= Hannah Rogers =

American softball player (born 1991)

Personal information
- Born: November 4, 1991 (age 35) Lake Wales, Florida, U.S.
- Height: 5 ft 10 in (1.78 m)

Sport
- Country: USA
- Sport: Softball
- College team: Florida Gators

Hannah Rogers (born November 4, 1991) is an American softball player. She attended Lake Wales High School in Lake Wales, Florida. She later attended the University of Florida, where she was an All-American pitcher for the Florida Gators softball team. Rogers led Florida to the 2014 Women's College World Series finals, where they defeated Alabama, 2–0 to claim Florida's first national championship in softball. Rogers was named the 2014 Women's College World Series Most Outstanding Player. She later went on to play professional softball with the USSSA Pride of National Pro Fastpitch.
