= Sarah Purvis =

American softball player (born 1992)

Personal information
- Born: March 23, 1992 (age 34) Warner Robins, Georgia, U.S.
- Height: 5 ft 7 in (1.70 m)

Sport
- Country: USA
- Sport: Softball
- College team: Georgia Southern Eagles

Sarah Purvis (born March 23, 1992) is an American softball player. She attended Northside High School in Warner Robins, Georgia. She later attended Georgia Southern University, where she pitched for the Georgia Southern Eagles softball team. Purvis led the Eagles to back-to-back Southern Conference championships and berths in the NCAA Division I softball tournament in 2012 and 2013. She later went on to play professional softball with the Dallas Charge of National Pro Fastpitch. She now owns Purvis Pitching in Middle Georgia. She is currently engaged and has a child.
