= Pennsylvania Rebellion =

Former National Pro Fastpitch softball team

- [[File: |frameless|class=pageimage|alt=]] Logo

Information
- League: National Pro Fastpitch
- Location: Washington, Pennsylvania
- Ballpark: Consol Energy Park
- Founded: 2013
- Folded: 2017
- League championships: 0
- Colors: Black, gold, white
- Ownership: Stu Williams

Current uniforms

The Pennsylvania Rebellion were a National Pro Fastpitch softball team based in Washington, Pennsylvania. They were added as an expansion team for the 2014 season, receiving the roster and draft position of the recently defunct NY/NJ Comets. They folded after the 2016 season.

== Franchise history ==
=== 2014 ===
The Rebellion joined NPF for the 2014 season, and received both the NY/NJ Comets' roster and draft position. This resulted in Pennsylvania having the overall first pick in the 2014 NPF draft, which they used for Arizona State's pitcher Dallas Escobedo, who pitched for the Rebellion's first ever win.

Overall, the Rebellion struggled through the season, batting a league-worst .199. Manager Rick Bertagnolli resigned following a 2–10 start, citing 'personal reasons.' Assistant coach Stacey Rice, was named to replace him. The Rebellion's inaugural season ended with 9–39 record, finishing in last place.

=== 2015 ===
On January 14, the Rebellion announced that the head coach of the Netherlands women's national softball team, Craig Montvidas, was hired as the Rebellion's coach. On January 26, Steve Zavacky was promoted to general manager. The team missed the playoffs, finishing in last place.

=== 2016 ===
The team missed the playoffs, finishing in last place.

On January 16, 2017, the NPF announced that the ownership of the Pennsylvania Rebellion would be dissolving the team, effective immediately. All Rebellion players under contract were granted free agency.

== General managers ==
- Francine Williams (2014)
- Steve Zavacky (2015-2016)

== All-time head coaches ==
#	Name	Term	Regular season				Playoffs			
#	Name	Term	GC	W	L	W%	GC	W	L	W%
1	Rick Bertagnolli	2014	12	2	10	.167	-	-	-	-
2	Stacey Rice	2014	36	7	29	.194	2	0	2	.000
3	Craig Montvidas	2015—2016	98	33	65	.337	-	-	-	-

17-33

== Season-by-season ==
Season records
Season	W	L	T	Finish	Playoff results
2014	9	39	0	4th place National Pro Fastpitch	Lost in NPF Semifinals
2015	16	32	0	5th place National Pro Fastpitch	Did not qualify
2016	17	33	0	6th place National Pro Fastpitch	Did not qualify
Totals	42	104	0		

== Final roster ==
Below is the final Rebellion roster after they made their final trade in January 2017. All players shown were granted free agency when the team was dissolved.

Pennsylvania Rebellion roster
Active roster (YYYY = Final season of player contract)		Inactive roster	Coaches
Pitchers: Vanessa Stokes (2017); 10 Emma Johnson (2017); 15 Madison Osias (2017); 17 Haylie Wagner (2017); 22 Miranda Kramer (2016); 33 Emily Weiman (2017); 41 Hayley Flynn (2017); 44 Dallas Escobedo (2017)	Catchers: 5 Mandy Ogle (2016); 6 Taylah Tsistsikronis (2017); 7 Lexie Elkins (2017); 23 Kristyn Sandberg; Utility players: Chelsea Forkin (2017); 2 Brittany Gomez (2017); Infielders: 1 Whitney Arion (2017); 4 Olivia Watkins (2016); 9 Kayla Winkfield (2017); 16 Stacey Porter (2016); 34 Chaley Brickey (2017); 35 Alisa Goler (2017); Outfielders: Caitlyn Attfield (2018); 8 Courtney Senas (2017); 14 Alexa Peterson (2016); 21 Victoria Hayward (2016)	Unsigned Draftees (Year Team's Rights Expire): Allexis Bennett (2017); Chelsea Wilkinson (2017); Bianka Bell (2017)	Legend: * Franchise Player Tag; (C) Captain; (A) Alternate captain; → All NPF rosters
