= EQT Park =

Baseball stadium in Pennsylvania

- The House of Thrills

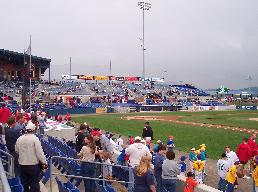

- Location within Pennsylvania Location within the United States
- Interactive map of EQT Park
- Former names: Falconi Field (2002–2006); CONSOL Energy Park (2007–2016); Wild Things Park (2017–2025)
- Address: 1 Washington Federal Way; Washington, PA 15301
- Coordinates: 40°9′15″N 80°17′1″W
- Owner: WashCo Ballpark Holdings
- Operator: Washington Wild Things
- Capacity: Baseball: 3,200; Concerts: 5,000
- Surface: Artificial Turf
- Field size: Left field: 320 feet Center field: 410 feet Right field: 320 feet

Construction
- Opened: May 29, 2002

Tenants
- Washington Wild Things (NAPB) 2002–present California Vulcans (NCAA) 2002–present Steel City Sparks (WPSL) 2005; Pittsburgh Riverhounds (USL) 2005–2006; Washington BlueSox 2006–2008; Pennsylvania Rebellion (NPF) 2014–2016

EQT Park is a 3,200-seat multi-purpose stadium in North Franklin Township, a suburb of Washington, Pennsylvania. It hosted its first regular season baseball game on May 29, 2002, as the primary tenants of the facility, the Washington Wild Things, lost to the Canton Coyotes, 3–0. The ballpark also hosts the California Vulcans baseball team, representing Pennsylvania Western University California. It was the home of the Pennsylvania Rebellion of the National Pro Fastpitch, a women's professional softball league, until 2017 when the team folded. It also hosts Washington High School's baseball team, McGuffey High School's baseball team, and the WPIAL Baseball Championships. It was briefly the home of the Pittsburgh Riverhounds soccer club (who now play at F.N.B. Stadium) during the 2005 and 2006 seasons. EQT Park is located near Interstate 70. ProGrass Synthetic Turf was installed in the fall of 2010.

The stadium was known as Falconi Field until April 12, 2007, when Consol Energy and Washington County Family Entertainment entered a naming rights partnership to rename the complex CONSOL Energy Park. Consol Energy has let the naming rights deal expire as of January 2017. On March 25, 2025, the Wild Things announced the new name of the facility as EQT Park.

== History ==
In 2001, a 16-member "baseball exploratory committee" led by Leo Trich, member of the Pennsylvania House of Representatives, helped form a nonprofit group named Ballpark Scholarships Inc. to build a $5.8 million ($10.5 million today) stadium in Washington County. $2 million of the cost of the stadium came in the form of taxpayer assistance, while the rest was funded privately. A large amount of the private financing needed to build the stadium came from a local businessman, Angelo F. Falconi. The Wild Things made their debut on May 25, 2002, at Falconi Field for an exhibition game against the Johnstown Johnnies.

Trich originally hoped to bring an affiliated Class A minor league team to Washington; however, he was unsuccessful. Meanwhile, a local group purchased the Canton Crocodiles of the independent Frontier League and moved them to the stadium to begin play as the Washington Wild Things in 2002. The team lost its inaugural game 3-0 to the Canton Coyotes.

The Wild Things rebounded from losing their first game to finish 56-28 and reached the Frontier League championship, which they lost to the Richmond Roosters three games to one. Playoffs included, the Wild Things drew 132,901 to Falconi Field in 2002. The year before the franchise had their games attended by just 29,703 fans in Canton, which is five times the population of Washington.

On April 12, 2007, the stadium's name was changed to CONSOL Energy Park after the Washington County-based coal mining company paid an undisclosed sum as part of a 10-year naming rights agreement. A plant garden just inside of the main entrance in right field contains a sign thanking Falconi for his contribution in the stadium's construction.

In 2012, WashCo Ballpark Holdings purchased the park from the non-profit Ballpark Scholarships Inc. in a deal that guaranteed that baseball will remain in the park for a decade. Leo Trich played a role in selling the park. At that time, Dermontti Dawson joined the ownership team. The Washington BlueSox played at the stadium from 2006 to 2008 until the team was moved to Butler. They also played at Ross Memorial Park and Alexandre Stadium during their tenure in Washington.

== Concerts ==
Bob Dylan played at Falconi Field in 2006. He returned to the park in 2009, this time with John Mellencamp and Willie Nelson.

On August 25, 2012, the Povertyneck Hillbillies played a reunion concert at the park. The group, based in western Pennsylvania, had minor national fame when they signed to the now defunct Rust Records.

Four chord music festival has been held here for four chord 7, 8, 9, and 11

== See also ==
- Ross Memorial Park and Alexandre Stadium

Events and tenants
Preceded by T.R. Hughes Ballpark	Host of the FL All-Star Game; Falconi Field; 2005	Succeeded by Bosse Field
