= The Stadium at the ESPN Wide World of Sports =

Baseball stadium at Walt Disney World

Coordinates: 28°20′13.5″N 81°33′21.6″W

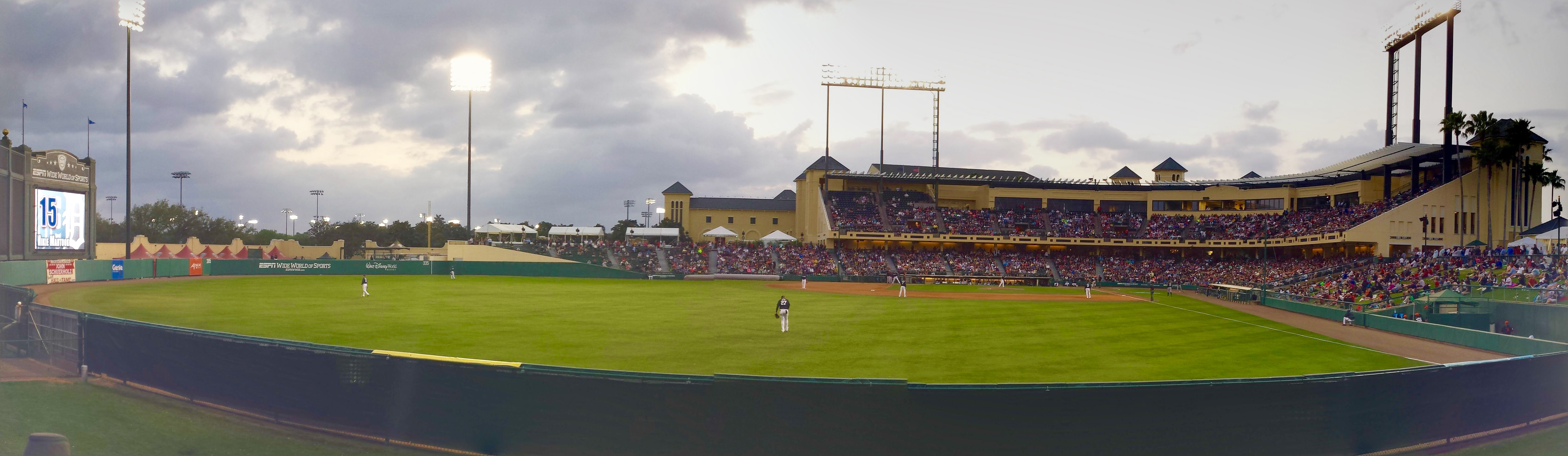
- Interactive map of The Stadium at the ESPN Wide World of Sports
- Former names: Champion Stadium (2008–2017); The Ballpark at Disney's Wide World of Sports (1997, 2007); Cracker Jack Stadium (1997–2006)
- Location: Walt Disney World Resort; 700 S. Victory Way; Kissimmee, Florida 34747
- Owner: Walt Disney Parks and Resorts
- Operator: ESPN Wide World of Sports Complex
- Capacity: 7,500
- Surface: Grass
- Field size: Left field – 335 ft (102 m); Left Center – 385 ft (117 m); Center Field – 400 ft (120 m); Right Center – 385 ft (117 m); Right field – 335 ft (102 m)

Construction
- Groundbreaking: July 1995
- Opened: March 28, 1997
- Architect: David M. Schwarz

Tenants
- Atlanta Braves (spring training; 1997–2019); Gulf Coast Braves (GCL; 1997–2019); Orlando Rays (SL; 2000–2003); USSSA Pride (NPF; 2011–2016); Tampa Bay Rays (spring training; 2023)

The Stadium at the ESPN Wide World of Sports is a baseball stadium located at the ESPN Wide World of Sports Complex in the Walt Disney World Resort. The stadium was built in 1997. It was most recently the home of the Rookie-league GCL Braves, until they moved to CoolToday Park in North Port.

The 7,500-seat stadium was designed by David M. Schwarz in a style the designer dubbed Florida Picturesque incorporating Venetian Gothic Revival, Mediterranean and Spanish influences with yellow-painted stucco, green-tile roofs, towers and arches.

== Name ==
The Stadium at the ESPN Wide World of Sports was originally known as The Ballpark then Cracker Jack Stadium. When it was first built, Frito-Lay purchased the naming rights to the venue for ten years and put its Cracker Jack brand on the stadium. Frito-Lay chose not to renew its naming rights deal. During most of 2007, it was referred to as The Ballpark at Disney's Wide World of Sports. On November 1 of that year, HanesBrands Inc. purchased the naming rights for ten years and renamed it Champion Stadium.

== History ==
Originally, Disney planned for no MLB permanent spring training tenant for the stadium, instead using as a Grapefruit League neutral site with rotating teams. However, the Braves organization became interested and moved in.

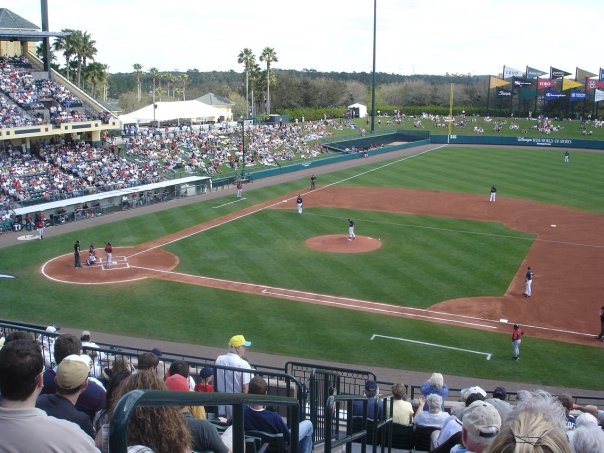
The Atlanta Braves Spring Training game against the New York Mets in 2008

The Ballpark opened with the rest of Disney's Wide World of Sports Complex on March 28, 1997, with an exhibition baseball game between the Atlanta Braves and the Cincinnati Reds. The Gulf Coast League Braves began play at the stadium in 1997, while the Atlanta Braves started its 20-year spring training lease in 1998.

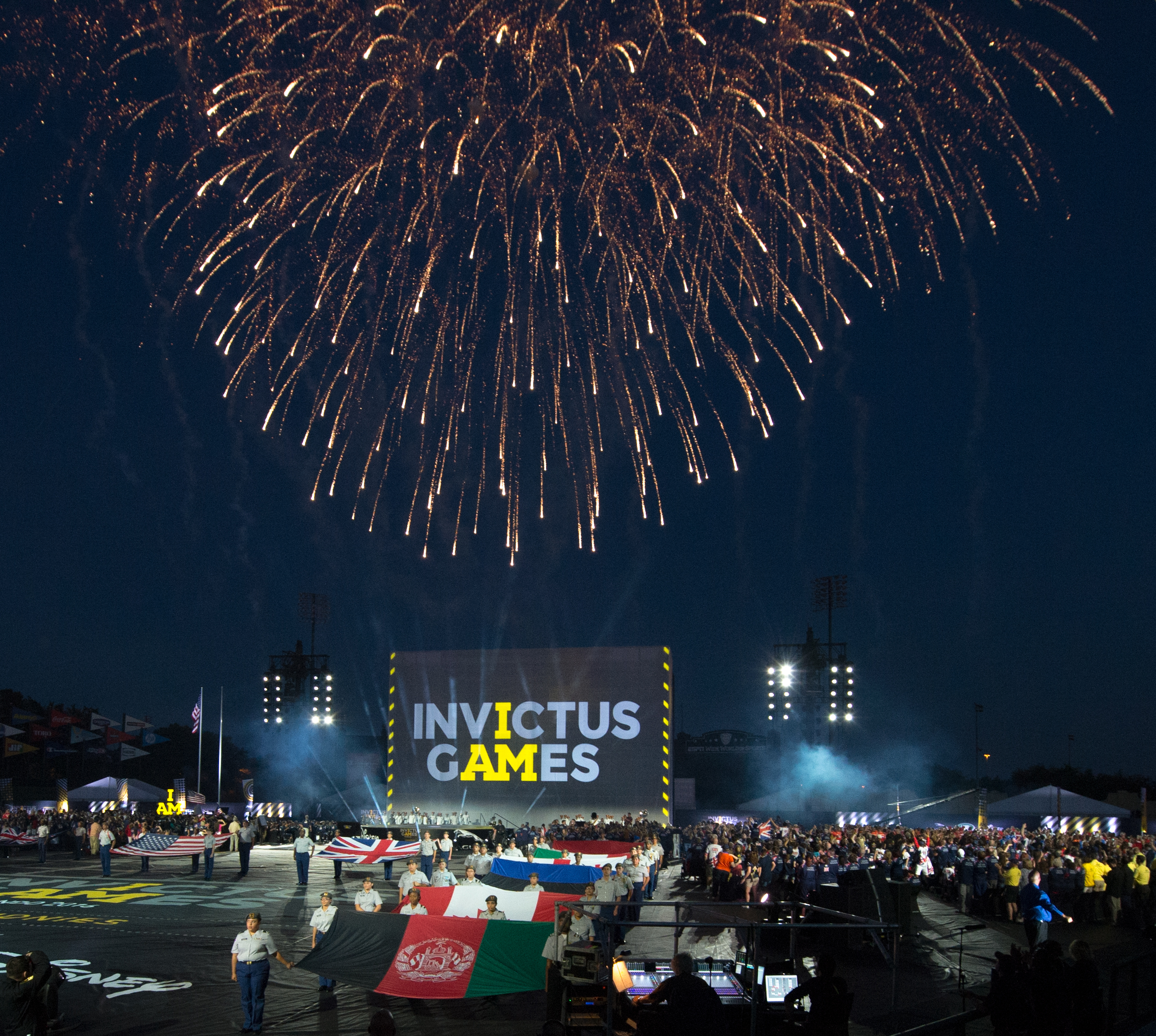
Opening ceremony of the 2016 Invictus Games

In 2000, after years of poor attendance at Tinker Field, the Orlando Rays moved to the Ballpark. However, the Rays continued to draw barely 1,000 fans a game in their new stadium. Things improved somewhat over the next three seasons; the Rays drew 150,051 fans in 2003, more than twice what they had seen just a few years earlier at Tinker Field, but still last in the league. Following the 2003 season, the Rays moved (breaking a 10-year lease at Disney after just four years) and became the Montgomery Biscuits.

The venue hosted the 2001 Atlantic 10 Conference baseball tournament, won by Temple.

The old style manual score board was replaced in 2003 with a larger electronic scoreboard and message center. Champion Stadium was used during first-round games for the 2006 World Baseball Classic. It hosted Pool D, and featured teams with professional players from Venezuela, Australia, Dominican Republic and Italy.

The stadium hosted its first regular season MLB games in May 2007 when the Tampa Bay Devil Rays swept the Texas Rangers in a three-game series. The series drew a total of 26,917 fans, and attendance went up each game. In April 2008, the Rays played another three-game series at the stadium, where they swept the Toronto Blue Jays.

In January 2017, the Braves announced a formal agreement to move their spring training home to CoolToday Park in North Port, Florida, which opened in 2019.

The stadium hosted two Banana Ball games by the Loco Beach Coconuts against the Party Animals on May 29 and 30, 2026. Banana Ball will return to the stadium from April 15–18, 2027 to host the 2027 Banana Ball Open, a mid-season tournament for all Banana Ball Championship League teams.

Preceded by Olympic Stadium; London	Invictus Games; Opening Ceremonies Venue; 2016 Invictus Games	Succeeded by Air Canada Centre; Toronto
