= Vanessa Stokes =

Australian softball player

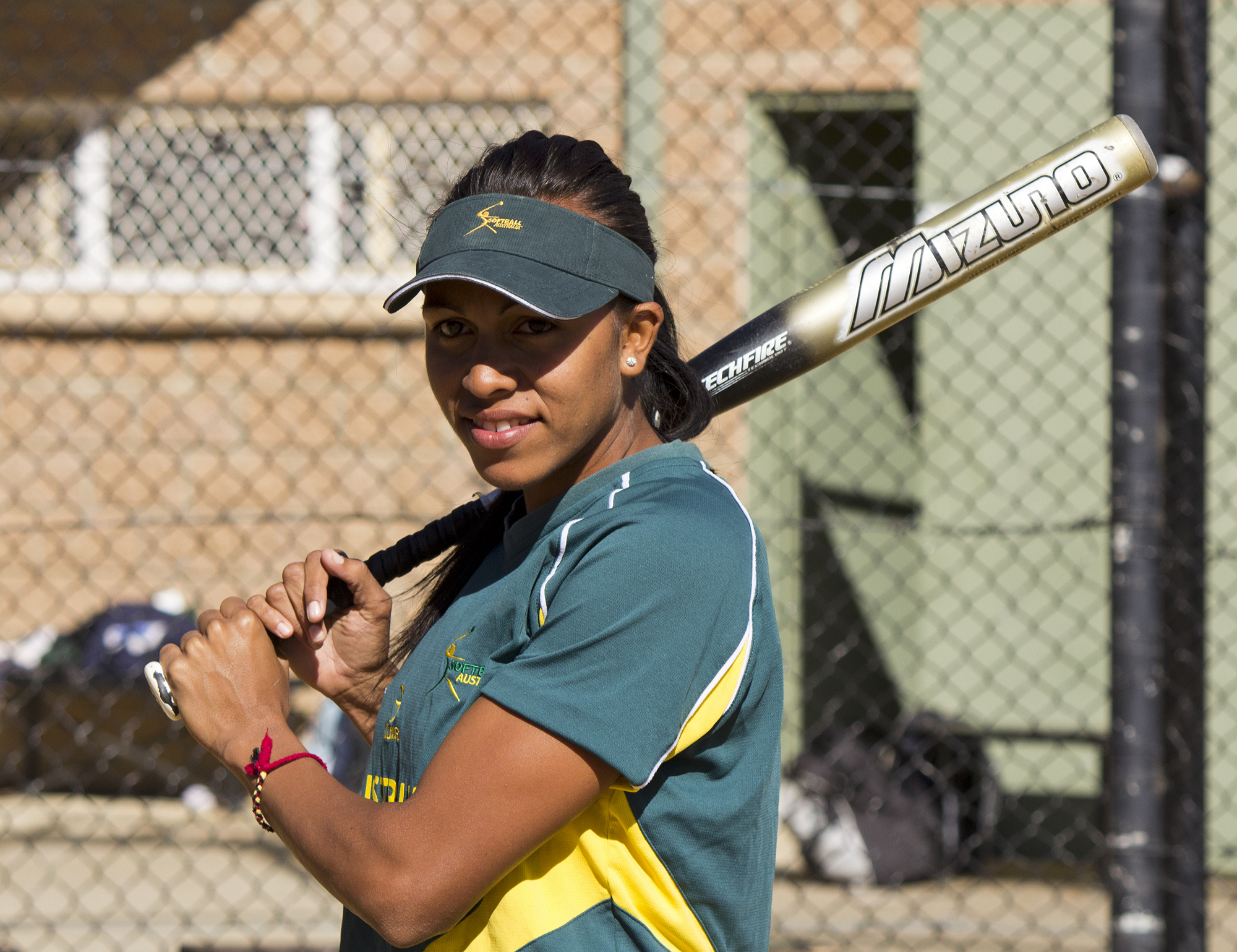
- Stokes in March 2012 during a photoshoot

Sport
- Country: Australia
- Sport: Softball
- Event: Women's team
- Club: Glenelg Rebels

Vanessa Stokes is an Australian softball pitcher. She plays club softball in South Australia. She has represented Australia on the junior and senior level.

== Personal ==
Stokes is an Aboriginal Australian from Gepps Cross, South Australia who grew up in Darwin. In 2003, she was awarded an Indigenous Excellence Scholarship. She moved to South Australia after her Darwin-based softball coach moved there and encouraged her to move as well. She attended Gepps Cross Girls High and took Japanese language classes. Her mother also played competitive sport, representing her state in national competitions in softball and soccer.

== Softball ==
Stokes is a pitcher. She started playing softball when she was four years old. Her mother was her first coach. As a young player, she dreamed of playing softball for the University of California, Los Angeles. She plays for the South Australian club Glenelg Rebels. She was with the team for their 2011 season. In March 2012, it was announced she and Stacey Porter would be ambassadors in a programme to increase aboriginal participation in softball around Australia.

=== Juniors ===
Stokes competed at the 2001 Arafura Games in softball. In 2001, she was invited to play for a Texas U14 team, Hearts of Texas at a national competition in Oklahoma. The Texas team paid for her travel to the country. She has represented Australia on the junior national level. In 2001, she was a member of the Australian U19 national team. She was invited to play for the U19 team when she was thirteen years old.

=== Senior national team ===
Stokes was a member of the 2012 Australia women's national softball team. She played 2012 game against New Zealand women's national softball team. In March 2012, she participated in a seven-game test series in Canberra against the Japanese national team. She was one of two South Australians to participate in the series.
