= Sarah Pauly =

American softball player (born 1983)

Biographical details
- Born: January 24, 1983 (age 43); Phoenix, Arizona, U.S.

Playing career
- 2002–2005: Texas A&M–Corpus Christi
- 2006: Connecticut Brakettes
- 2007–2008: Washington Glory
- 2009–2013: USSSA Pride
- 2011: Honda Reverta
- 2014: Pennsylvania Rebellion
- 2015–2016: Akron Racers
- Position: Pitcher

Coaching career (HC unless noted)
- 2007–2008: Spartanburg Methodist (pitching)
- 2009–2010: College of Charleston (pitching)
- 2012–2015: Texas A&M–Corpus Christi (pitching)

Accomplishments and honors

Championships
- 3× Cowles Cup (2007, 2010, 2013); 3× Big South Tournament (2003–2005)

Awards
- Third-team NFCA All-American (2005); 3× Big South Pitcher of the Year (2003–2005)

Sarah Jo Pauly (born January 24, 1983) is an American, former collegiate All-American, retired 7-time professional All-Star, right-handed softball pitcher and coach originally from Phoenix, Arizona. She played college softball at Texas A&M–Corpus Christi from 2002-2005 and holds most of the pitching records. She is the Big South Conference career strikeouts, ERA, shutouts, WHIP, strikeout ratio, no-hitters (9) and perfect games (2) leader in just three seasons. She joined the National Pro Fastpitch in 2006 and as a rookie earned Pitcher of The Year and currently holds NPF records for the most innings pitched, games played and games started through her 11 seasons as arguably the most successful undrafted player in league history. She is one of five NCAA Division I pitchers to win 100 games, strikeout 1,000 batters, maintain a sub-1.00 ERA and average double digit strikeouts for her entire career.

== Early life ==
Pauly was born in Menomonie, Wisconsin and later grew up in Phoenix. She attended Desert Vista High School and led them to two regional appearances in 2000-01. Her father Rick Pauly played men's fastpitch was a coach and tutor for softball.

== Texas A&M-Corpus Christi Islanders ==
2002: Pauly led her team with 25 wins, 266 strikeouts, 1.63 ERA in 219.2 innings and a strikeout ratio of 8.4, all of which were school records. She earned First Team All-American Independent Colleges as the Corpus Christi Islanders finished up probationary status to enter the NCAA Division I.

2003: Pauly threw three no-hitters (one perfect game on April 26 vs. the Centenary Ladies) to earn All-Big South honors. She set every pitching record as a full-time Division I program with her wins, ERA, strikeouts, WHIP, shutouts, innings pitched and a strikeout ratio of 11.3 (all except the wins led the conference). She ranked in the top-10 for both strikeouts and strikeout ratio for the NCAA that year.

Pauly achieved a career best 19.0 consecutive hitless innings by retiring the final batter faced in a loss to the Texas Longhorns on April 24. She then tossed back-to-back no-hitters over Centenary before starting off against the Liberty Flames with 4.2 innings before surrendering a hit. Pauly fanned 38 batters and only allowed a hit by pitch during the streak.

2004: Again, Pauly earned all-season conference honors, adding "Pitcher of The Year". She bettered every season record she'd previously set in: wins, strikeouts, ERA, innings pitched, shutouts, WHIP, all leading the conference, resulting in a conference pitching Triple Crown. She led in WHIP and was top-5 for the season in strikeouts and strikeout ratio for the NCAA, as she had been the year previous for the latter categories.

On March 20, Pauly began a career best 14 consecutive game win streak in a doubleheader sweep over the Birmingham–Southern Panthers continuing to May 15 in a victory over the Winthrop Eagles to claim the Big South title. Pauly surrendered only one earned run for an 0.08 ERA and struck out 165 batters in 16 games (11 complete) in 90.2 innings pitched. During the streak on March 21, Pauly no-hit the Liberty Flames, setting a school and career record by tallying 19 strikeouts in regulation. The total is tied third best for a single 7-inning game in the NCAA. On that day, Pauly also reached her 1,000th career strikeout with the final punch out of the game.

2005: For her final season, Pauly tossed 5 no-hitters (NCAA top-5 season record) including a perfect game, as well as repeating all-season honors, including a National Fastpitch Coaches' Association Third Team All-American selection. She broke and set her final set of records with career highs in wins, strikeouts (both conference records), ERA, shutouts, innings, WHIP and strikeout ratio (12.0), all of which again led the Big South for a second Triple Crown and ranked top-5 in the NCAA that season.

Pauly kicked off the season tossing 40.2 consecutive scoreless innings ended by Centenary in a 2-1 win on February 12. In a doubleheader with the Houston Cougars on April 2, Pauly took game one to win her 100th career victory. The Corpus Christi Islanders made their third NCAA Tournament but failed to advance past the Mississippi State Bulldogs in extra innings after managing to score their first run in three tournament appearances.

Pauly amassed an NCAA Division I record of 87-33, 1,370 strikeouts, 0.69 ERA, 0.58 WHIP, 53 shutouts, 9 no-hitters, 2 perfect games and a strikeout ratio of 11.5 in 830.0 innings pitched. Naturally, she became and is the Big South queen for all those marks and ranks top-5 in wins and innings pitched. Pauly's strikeout ratio set a new NCAA career record and now stands 6th all-time; her no-hitters are tied 10th all-time. Combined with her freshman marks when the Islanders were an Independent, Pauly's overall record reads 112-46 record, 1,636 strikeouts, 57 shutouts, 0.88 ERA in 1049.2 innings, all of which are tops for an Islander career.

== National Pro Fastpitch ==
Pauly signed with the Connecticut Brakettes and made her official debut on June 1, 2006; Pauly had a no-hitter going before rain disrupted play and forced rescheduling. She was named "Pitcher of The Year" and led her team all the way to the Cowles Cup Championship played on August 28, 2006 in which Pauly lost 2-0, though none of her runs were earned. Earlier on August 3, Pauly set a regulation best with 13 strikeouts against the Philadelphia Force and on August 27, Pauly struck out a career best 14 batters in a 1-0 win against the Akron Racers.

In the seasons since, Pauly has made seven (2006-2008, 2010, 2013-2015) All-National Pro Fastpitch Teams with Brakettes, Washington Glory, USSSA Pride, the Pennsylvania Rebellion and the Akron Racers. She also has made it to the championship game seven seasons of her career (not including 2005, 2014–16), pitching in all the games except 2010 and 2013 and of those starting all except 2007. That year she won her first Cowles Cup, her second in 2010 and her third in 2013 with the USSSA Pride. Pauly has also led the league in wins in 2010 (career high) and twice in ERA, in 2006 (career best) and 2008 respectively. From June 19-July 25, 2010, she won 9 consecutive games for a career highlight before losing to the Chicago Bandits. In her 66.0 innings, she allowed 49 hits, 14 earned runs and walks each, striking out 58 for a 1.48 ERA and 0.95 WHIP.

In 2011, Pauly threw 24 consecutive shutout innings for a career best from July 10-August 4 when the NPF Diamonds scored a 3-2 victory to end it. She won 4 games, gave up 9 hits and 2 walks, struck out 20 and had 0.46 WHIP for the streak. On August 8, 2015, Sarah Pauly became the first NPF pitcher to win 100 games. Pauly ranks as the all-time leader in innings pitched, games played and games started. She is also top-10 all-time in wins, strikeouts and shutouts. Pauly played overseas for the 2017 season before retiring on August 9, 2017.

Pauly continues to play and coach professionally overseas in Japan, Italy and Australia.

== Coaching career ==
In 2007, Pauly began coaching with at Spartanburg Methodist College and mentored pitchers to a deep postseason run at the Division I NJCAA National Tournament. In 2009, she became an assistant at the College of Charleston.

From 2012 to 2015, Pauly was pitching coach at Texas A&M–Corpus Christi. In 2012, Pauly was inducted in the Islanders Hall of Fame. On June 4, 2014, Pauly was named to the Big South Conference All-Decade Team.

== Statistics ==
=== Corpus Christi Islanders ===
YEAR	W	L	GP	GS	CG	SHO	SV	IP	H	R	ER	BB	SO	ERA	WHIP
2002	25	13	49	22	13	4	2	219.2	—	—	51	—	266	1.63	—
2003	23	16	48	36	34	18	7	265.2	134	44	31	37	431	0.82	0.64
2004	27	10	49	34	31	13	6	276.1	132	45	28	40	442	0.71	0.62
2005	37	7	51	37	35	22	3	288.0	111	35	23	31	497	0.56	0.49
TOTALS	112	46	197	129	113	57	18	1049.2	377+	124+	133	108+	1636	0.88	0.58+

=== NPF Connecticut Brakettes, Washington Glory, USSSA Pride, Pennsylvania Rebellion & Akron Racers ===
YEAR	W	L	GP	GS	CG	SHO	SV	IP	H	R	ER	BB	SO	ERA	WHIP
2006	15	5	22	18	18	4	0	143.0	94	33	25	36	138	1.22	0.91
2007	13	6	26	18	6	4	2	122.1	91	32	24	31	122	1.37	1.00
2008	11	6	22	17	11	3	1	118.1	93	37	29	27	112	1.72	1.01
2009	9	7	18	15	14	4	0	110.0	99	40	34	43	85	2.16	1.29
2010	16	5	26	20	16	4	1	149.0	120	50	41	33	114	1.92	1.02
2011	4	4	13	9	6	3	0	68.2	51	23	20	14	60	2.05	0.95
2012	9	2	13	13	10	2	0	68.0	66	25	24	15	55	2.47	1.19
2013	9	5	17	14	7	2	0	88.0	82	42	40	25	90	3.18	1.21
2014	4	13	22	16	0	1	1	107.1	110	57	41	13	56	2.68	1.15
2015	10	5	23	18	9	4	2	114.1	99	45	34	26	69	2.08	1.09
2016	7	7	19	17	8	2	1	91.1	105	52	45	38	64	3.46	1.57
TOTALS	107	65	221	175	105	33	8	1180.1	1010	436	357	301	965	2.12	1.11

== Links ==
- NCAA Division I softball career strikeouts list
- NCAA Division I softball career -1.00 ERAs list
