= 2017 NPF transactions =

The following is a list 2017 NPF transactions that have occurred in the National Pro Fastpitch softball league since the completion of the 2016 season and during the 2017 season. It lists which team each player has been traded to, signed by, or claimed by, and for which player(s) or draft pick (s), if applicable. Players who have retired are also listed. Per Commissioner Cheri Kempf's tweet, NPF contracts expire in February, therefore the extension of a contract "through 2028" means the player is only contracted to play through the 2027 season, with the contract expiring the following February. "Thru 2028 season" therefore would mean a contract that expires in February 2029, covering only games played in 2028.

== Transactions ==
Source:Any transactions listed below without a reference were originally announced on NPF's transactions page

Date	Player	Team	Type	Details/Ref
08/01/2017	As of 5:00 pm ET, All Rosters will Freeze Until the Conclusion of the Championship Series			
07/31/2017	Kelsee Selman-Rowe	Texas Charge	Signing	Kelsee Selman-Rowe Signs with Charge thru 2017 season
07/23/2017	Ali Aguilar	Scrap Yard Dawgs	Signing	Ali Aguilar Signs with Dawgs thru 2021 season
07/23/2017	Christi Orgeron	Scrap Yard Dawgs	Release	Christi Orgeron released from Dawgs
07/19/2017	Kelsey Stewart	Texas Charge	Signing	Kelsey Stewart Signs with Charge thru 2018 season
07/15/2017	As of 5:00 pm ET, All Trading Between Teams Cease Until the Conclusion of the Championship Series			
07/14/2017	Kasey Cooper	Scrap Yard Dawgs	Signging	Kasey Cooper Signs with Dawgs thru 2018 season
07/14/2017	Sara Plourde	Scrap Yard Dawgs	Release	Sara Plourde Released from Dawgs
07/08/2017	Danielle O'Toole	Chicago Bandits	Signing	Danielle O'Toole Signs with Bandits thru 2017 season
07/06/2017	Amanda Kamekona	Scrap Yard Dawgs	Trade	Alisa Goler Traded from Dawgs to Charge In Exchange for Katiyana Mauga & Amanda Kamekona
07/06/2017	Katiyana Mauga	Scrap Yard Dawgs	Trade	Alisa Goler Traded from Dawgs to Charge In Exchange for Katiyana Mauga & Amanda Kamekona
07/06/2017	Alisa Goler	Texas Charge	Trade	Alisa Goler Traded from Dawgs to Charge In Exchange for Katiyana Mauga & Amanda Kamekona
07/01/2017	Jade Rhodes	Scrap Yard Dawgs	Release	Jade Rhodes released from Dawgs
06/30/2017	Anissa Urtez	Scrap Yard Dawgs	Signing	Anissa Urtez Signs with Dawgs thru 2018 season
06/30/2017	Amanda Fama	Scrap Yard Dawgs	Release	Amanda Fama released from Dawgs
06/23/2017	Delanie Gourley	Texas Charge	Signing	Delanie Gourley Signs with Charge thru 2018 season
06/16/2017	Taylor Schlopy	Akron Racers	Derostered	Taylor Schlopy "Derostered" from Racers (i.e., Schlopy requested released, was denied and instead removed from the roster while remaining under exclusive contract to Racers
06/16/2017	Alex Hugo	Akron Racers	Derostered	Alex Hugo "Derostered" from Racers (i.e., Hugo requested released, was denied and instead removed from the roster while remaining under exclusive contract to Racers
06/16/2017	Emily Allard	Chicago Bandits	Release	Emily Allard Released from Bandits
06/15/2017	Nicole Ries	Texas Charge	Signing	Nicole Ries Signs with Charge thru 2017 season
06/15/2017	Shelby Hiers	Akron Racers	Signing	Shelby Hiers Signs with Racers thru 2017 season
06/15/2017	Sarah Pauly	Akron Racers	Release	Sarah Pauly Released from Racers
06/12/2017	Bailey Landry	Texas Charge	Signing	Bailey Landry Signs with Charge thru 2017 season
06/08/2017	Sara Plourde	Scrap Yard Dawgs	Signing	Sara Plourde Signs with Dawgs thru 2017 season
06/08/2017	Lee Ann Spivey	Scrap Yard Dawgs	Retirement	Lee Ann Spivey Retires from National Pro Fastpitch
06/05/2017	Sahvanna Jaquish	Chicago Bandits	Signing	Sahvanna Jaquish Signs with Bandits thru 2017 season
06/07/2017	Hannah Flippen	Scrap Yard Dawgs	Signing	Hannah Flippen Signs with Dawgs thru 2018 season
06/06/2017	Morgan Foley	Scrap Yard Dawgs	Signing	Morgan Foley Signs with Dawgs thru 2018 season
06/05/2017	Morgan Zerkle	Scrap Yard Dawgs	Signing	Morgan Zerkle Signs with Dawgs thru 2018 season
06/05/2017	Breanna Wonderly	Chicago Bandits	Signing	Breanna Wonderly Signs with Bandits thru 2017 season
06/05/2017	Megan Geer	Akron Racers	Signing	Megan Geer Signs with Racers thru 2018 season
06/05/2017	Katiyana Mauga	Texas Charge	Signing	Katiyana Mauga Signs with Charge thru 2018 season
06/05/2017	Nancy Bowling	Beijing Shougang Eagles	Signing	Nancy Bowling Signs with Eagles thru 2017 season
06/02/2017	Sydney Broderick	USSSA Florida Pride	Signing	Sydney Broderick Signs with Pride thru 2017 season
06/02/2017	Jessica Burroughs	USSSA Florida Pride	Signing	Jessica Burroughs Signs with Pride thru 2019 season
06/02/2017	Mo Mercado	USSSA Florida Pride	Signing	Mo Mercado Signs with Pride thru 2019 season
06/02/2017	Amanda Perez	USSSA Florida Pride	Signing	Amanda Perez Signs with Pride thru 2019 season
06/02/2017	Sierra Hyland	Chicago Bandits	Signing	Sierra Hyland Signs with Bandits thru 2017 season
06/01/2017	Alex Powers	USSSA Florida Pride	Signing	Alex Powers Signs with Pride thru 2019 season
05/31/2017	Emily Vincent	Texas Charge	Signing	Emily Vincent Signs with Charge thru 2017 season
05/31/2017	Sara Groenewegen	Akron Racers	Signing	Sara Groenewegen Signs with Racers thru 2019 season
05/31/2017	Nicole Schroeder	Akron Racers	Signing	Nicole Schroeder Signs with Racers thru 2017 season
05/30/2017	Kelsey Stewart	USSSA Florida Pride	Release	Kelsey Stewart Released from Pride
05/30/2017	Aubree Munro	USSSA Florida Pride	Release	Aubree Munro Released from Pride
05/30/2017	Rachele Fico	Akron Racers	Signing	Rachele Fico Signs with Racers thru 2017 season
05/30/2017	Abby Ramirez	Chicago Bandits	Signing	Abby Ramirez Signs with Bandits thru 2017 season
05/29/2017	Haley Fagan	Akron Racers	Signing	Haley Fagan Signs with Racers thru 2018 season
05/28/2017	Chandler Rice	Akron Racers	Signing	Chandler Rice Signs with Racers thru 2017 season
05/28/2017	Ruby Rivera	Texas Charge	Signing	Ruby Rivera Signs with Charge thru 2018 season
05/28/2017	Lauren Sweet	Texas Charge	Retirement	Lauren Sweet Retires from National Pro Fastpitch
05/20/2017	Lindsey Stephens	Texas Charge	Retirement	Lindsey Stephens Retires from National Pro Fastpitch
05/27/2017	Kristen Wyckoff	Akron Racers	Signing	Kristen Wyckoff Signs with Racers thru 2017
05/27/2017	Megan Betsa	Akron Racers	Signing	Megan Betsa Signs with Racers thru 2019 season
05/26/2017	Alexis Silkwood	Akron Racers	Signing	Alexis Silkwood Signs with Racers thru 2018 season
05/25/2017	Jill Barrett	Chicago Bandits	Retirement	Jill Barrett Retires from National Pro Fastpitch
05/24/2017	Maddy Grimm	Akron Racers	Signing	Maddy Grimm Signs with Racers thru 2019 season
05/24/2017	Danielle Zymkowitz	Chicago Bandits	Signing	Danielle Zymkowitz Re-Signs with Bandits thru 2017 season
05/23/2017	Janice Blackman	Chicago Bandits	Release	Janice Blackman Released from Bandits
05/20/2017	Harmony Schwethelm	Texas Charge	Retirement	Harmony Schwethelm Retires from National Pro Fastpitch
05/18/2017	Sara Driesenga	Scrap Yard Dawgs	Retirement	Sara Driesenga Retires from National Pro Fastpitch
05/17/2017	MJ Knighten	Scrap Yard Dawgs	Signing	MJ Knighten Signs with Dawgs thru 2019 season
05/16/2017	Katie Cotta	Texas Charge	Retirement	Katie Cotta Retires from National Pro Fastpitch
05/12/2017	Sara Plourde	Scrap Yard Dawgs	Release	Sara Plourde Released from Dawgs
05/10/2017	Cheyenne Cordes	Texas Charge	Retirement	Cheyene Cordes Retires from National Pro Fastpitch
04/24/2017	Delanie Gourley	Texas Charge	Trade	Dawgs traded Draftee Pick Delanie Gourley In Exchange For Charge's 13th and 25th Overall Pick in the 2017 NPF Draft
04/21/2017	Brittany Mack	Texas Charge	Signing	Brittany Mack Signs with Charge thru 2018 season
04/20/2017	Sandra Simmons	Akron Racers	Release	Sandra Simmons Released from Racers
04/20/2017	Geri Ann Glasco	Akron Racers	Release	Geri Ann Glasco Released from Racers
04/18/2017	Lauren Sweet	Texas Charge	Trade	Pride Trade Lauren Sweet and their 13th and 14th Overall Picks in 2017 Draft In Exchange For Charge 20th Overall Pick in the 2017 Draft and 1st Pick in the 2nd Round of the 2018 NPF Draft
03/27/2017	Lexie Elkins	Chicago Bandits	Retirement	Lexie Elkins Retires from National Pro Fastpitch
03/14/2017	Rachel Lack	Chicago Bandits	Signing	Rachel Lack Signs with Bandits thru 2017 season
03/14/2017	Kaia Parnaby	Chicago Bandits	Signing	Kaia Parnaby Signs with Bandits thru 2017 season
03/14/2017	Samantha Poole	Chicago Bandits	Signing	Samantha Poole Signs with Bandits thru 2017 season
03/14/2017	Ellen Roberts	Chicago Bandits	Signing	Ellen Roberts Signs with Bandits thru 2017 season
03/06/2017	Allexis Bennett	Scrap Yard Dawgs	Signing	Allexis Bennett Signs with Dawgs thru 2018 season
03/02/2017	Emily Allard	Chicago Bandits	Signing	Emily Allard Signs with Bandits thru 2017 Season
03/01/2017	Janice Blackman	Chicago Bandits	Signing	Janice Blackman Signs with Bandits thru 2017 season
03/01/2017	Stacey McManus	Chicago Bandits	Signing	Stacey McManus Signs with Bandits thru 2017 season
02/27/2017	Chelsea Forkin	Chicago Bandits	Signing	Chelsea Forkin Signs with Bandits thru 2017 season
02/27/2017	Taylah Tsitsikronis	Chicago Bandits	Signing	Taylah Tsitsikronis Signs with Bandits thru 2017 season
02/23/2017	Kristyn Sandberg	Texas Charge	Signing	Kristyn Sandberg Signs with Charge thru 2018 season
02/23/2017	Chelsea Thomas	Texas Charge	Retirement	Chelsea Thomas Retires from National Pro Fastpitch
02/23/2017	Stacy May-Johnson	Chicago Bandits	Signing	Stacy May-Johnson Signs with Bandits thru 2017 season
02/22/2017	Danielle Henderson	Texas Charge	Release	Danielle Henderson Released from Charge
02/19/2017	Mikela Manewa	Scrap Yard Dawgs	Retirement	Mikela Manewa Retires from National Pro Fastpitch
02/17/2017	Hannah Day	Akron Racers	Signing	Hannah Day Re-Signs with Racers thru 2017 season
02/15/2017	Kaitlyn Richardson	Texas Charge	Free Agency	Kaitlyn Richardson becomes free agent
02/15/2017	Allie Bauch	Chicago Bandits	Free Agency	Allie Bauch becomes free agent
02/15/2017	Kelsey Dotson	Chicago Bandits	Free Agency	Kelsey Dotson becomes free agent
02/15/2017	Andrea Filler	Chicago Bandits	Free Agency	Andrea Filler becomes free agent
02/15/2017	Morgan Foley	Chicago Bandits	Free Agency	Morgan Foley becomes free agent
02/15/2017	Danielle Zymkowitz	Chicago Bandits	Free Agency	Danielle Zymkowitz becomes free agent
02/15/2017	Hannah Day	Akron Racers	Free Agency	Hannah Day becomes free agent
02/15/2017	Rachele Fico	Akron Racers	Free Agency	Rachele Fico becomes free agent
02/15/2017	Emily Messer	Akron Racers	Free Agency	Emily Messer becomes free agent
02/15/2017	Alison Owen	Akron Racers	Free Agency	Alison Owen becomes free agent
02/15/2017	Hannah Perryman	Akron Racers	Free Agency	Hannah Perryman becomes free agent
02/10/2017	Angel Bunner	USSSA Florida Pride	Extension	Angel Bunner Extends Contract with Pride thru 2018 season
02/10/2017	Jill Barrett	Chicago Bandits	Franchise Player Tag	Bandits place Franchise Player Tag on Jill Barrett
02/09/2017	Shelby Turnier	Chicago Bandits	Extension	Shelby Turnier Extends Contract with Bandits thru 2017 season
02/07/2017	Alaynie Page	Chicago Bandits	Release	Alaynie Page Released from Bandits
02/07/2017	Sara Moulton	Chicago Bandits	Retirement	Sara Moulton Retires from National Pro Fastpitch
02/06/2017	Lacey Waldrop	Chicago Bandits	Extension	Lacey Waldrop Extends Contract with Bandits thru 2017 season
02/03/2017	Brenna Moss	Chicago Bandits	Extension	Brenna Moss Extends Contract with Bandits thru 2017 season
02/03/2017	Michelle Gascoigne	Scrap Yard Dawgs	Retirement	Michelle Gascoigne Retires from National Pro Fastpitch
02/01/2017	Taylore Fuller	Chicago Bandits	Extension	Taylore Fuller Extends Contract with Bandits thru 2017 season
02/01/2017	Alexis Overstreet	Scrap Yard Dawgs	Retirement	Alexis Overstreet Retires from National Pro Fastpitch
01/31/2017	Sammy Marshall	Chicago Bandits	Signing	Sammy Marshall Signs with Bandits thru 2017 season
01/31/2017	Alexa Peterson	Chicago Bandits	Signing	Alexa Peterson Signs with Bandits thru 2017 season
01/31/2017	Brittany Gomez	Texas Charge	Signing	Brittany Gomez Signs with Charge thru 2018 season
01/31/2017	Bianka Bell	USSSA Florida Pride	Signing	Bianka Bell Signs with Pride thru 2018 season
01/29/2017	Tatum Edwards	Chicago Bandits	Retirement	Tatum Edwards Retires from National Pro Fastpitch
01/28/2017	Natalie Hernandez	Chicago Bandits	Extension	Natalie Hernandez Extends Contract thru 2017 season
01/28/2017	Emily Crane	Chicago Bandits	Extension	Emily Crane Extends Contract thru 2017 season
01/28/2017	Kristen Brown	Chicago Bandits	Extension	Kristen Brown Extends Contract with Bandits thru 2017 season
01/28/2017	Megan Blank	Chicago Bandits	Extension	Megan Blank Extends Contract thru 2017 season
01/28/2017	Emily Carosone	Chicago Bandits	Extension	Emily Carosone Extends Contract thru 2017 season
01/28/2017	Olivia Watkins	Scrap Yard Dawgs	Signing	Olivia Watkins Signs with Dawgs thru 2018 season
01/28/2017	Lexie Elkins	Chicago Bandits	Signing	Lexie Elkins Signs with Bandits thru 2017 season
01/28/2017	Haylie Wagner	Chicago Bandits	Signing	Haylie Wagner Signs with Bandits thru 2017 season
01/27/2017	Angel Bunner	USSSA Florida Pride	Trade	Bandits Trade Angel Bunner to the Pride in Exchange for $7500
01/26/2017	Taylore Fuller	Chicago Bandits	Trade	Dawgs Trade Taylore Fuller, Emily Crane, 2018 Dawgs 1st Round Draft Pick, and $10,000 in Exchange for Bandits Taylor Edwards, Brittany Cervantes, 2017 Bandits 3rd Round Draft Pick (#12 overall) and 2017 Bandits 4th Round Draft Pick (#17 overall)
01/26/2017	Emily Crane	Chicago Bandits	Trade	Dawgs Trade Taylore Fuller, Emily Crane, 2018 Dawgs 1st Round Draft Pick, and $10,000 in Exchange for Bandits Taylor Edwards, Brittany Cervantes, 2017 Bandits 3rd Round Draft Pick (#12 overall) and 2017 Bandits 4th Round Draft Pick (#17 overall)
01/26/2017	Taylor Edwards	Scrap Yard Dawgs	Trade	Dawgs Trade Taylore Fuller, Emily Crane, 2018 Dawgs 1st Round Draft Pick, and $10,000 in Exchange for Bandits Taylor Edwards, Brittany Cervantes, 2017 Bandits 3rd Round Draft Pick (#12 overall) and 2017 Bandits 4th Round Draft Pick (#17 overall)
01/26/2017	Brittany Cervantes	Scrap Yard Dawgs	Trade	Dawgs Trade Taylore Fuller, Emily Crane, 2018 Dawgs 1st Round Draft Pick, and $10,000 in Exchange for Bandits Taylor Edwards, Brittany Cervantes, 2017 Bandits 3rd Round Draft Pick (#12 overall) and 2017 Bandits 4th Round Draft Pick (#17 overall)
01/26/2017	Amanda Kamekona	Texas Charge	Trade	Charge Trade their 4th Round Pick in the 2018 NPF Draft to the Bandits in Exchange for Amanda Kamekona, 2017 5th Round Pick (#22 overall), and 2017 5th Round Pick (#25 overall)
01/26/2017	Renada Davis	Texas Charge	Trade	Charge Trade 4th Round Pick (#18 overall pick) in the 2017 NPF Draft to Dawgs in Exchange for Renada Davis
01/25/2017	Renada Davis	Scrap Yard Dawgs	Trade	Charge Trade Renada Davis to Dawgs in exchange for Dawgs' 4th Round Pick (#18 overall pick) in the 2017 NPF Draft
01/25/2017	Aimee Creger	Akron Racers	Extension	Aimee Creger Extends Contract with Racers thru 2017 season
01/25/2017	Vicky Galasso	Texas Charge	Release	Vicky Galsso Released from Charge
01/24/2017	Haley Outon	Texas Charge	Trade	Racers Trade Haley Outon to Charge in exchange for Charge's 3rd Round Pick (#15 overall pick) in the 2017 NPF Draft
01/23/2017	Kellsi Kloss	Chicago Bandits	Retirement	Kellsi Kloss Retires from National Pro Fastpitch
01/23/2017	Laura Winter	Akron Racers	Extension	Laura Winter Extends Contract with Racers thru 2017 season
01/21/2017	Brianna Cherry	Scrap Yard Dawgs	Signing	Brianna Cherry Signs with Dawgs thru 2018 season
01/21/2017	Mandy Ogle	Texas Charge	Signing	Mandy Ogle Signs with Charge thru 2017 season
01/19/2017	Kaylyn Castillo	Texas Charge	Retirement	Kaylyn Castillo Retires from National Pro Fastpitch
01/17/2017	Miranda Kramer	Scrap Yard Dawgs	Signing	Miranda Kramer Signs with Dawgs thru 2018 season
01/17/2017	Emily Weiman	Akron Racers	Signing	Emily Weiman Signs with Racers thru 2017 season
01/16/2017	Dallas Escobedo	Texas Charge	Signing	Dallas Escobedo Signs with Charge thru 2018 season
01/16/2017	Kayla Winkfield	Scrap Yard Dawgs	Signing	Kayla Winkfield Signs with Dawgs thru 2018 season
01/16/2017	Alisa Goler	Scrap Yard Dawgs	Signing	Alisa Goler Signs with Dawgs thru 2018 season
01/16/2017	Nikia Williams	Texas Charge	Release	Nikia Williams Released from Charge
01/16/2017	Janelle Lindvall	Scrap Yard Dawgs	Retirement	Janelle Lindvall Retires from National Pro Fastpitch
01/15/2017	Madison Shipman	Scrap Yard Dawgs	Retirement	Madison Shipman Retires from National Pro Fastpitch
01/15/2017	Kristyn Sandberg	Pennsylvania Rebellion	Free Agency	Kristyn Sandberg Granted Free Agency Upon Dissolution of Rebellion
01/15/2017	Courtney Senas	Pennsylvania Rebellion	Free Agency	Courtney Senas Granted Free Agency Upon Dissolution of Rebellion
01/15/2017	Vanessa Stokes	Pennsylvania Rebellion	Free Agency	Vanessa Stokes Granted Free Agency Upon Dissolution of Rebellion
01/15/2017	Taylah Tsitsikronis	Pennsylvania Rebellion	Free Agency	Taylah Tsitsikronis Granted Free Agency Upon Dissolution of Rebellion
01/15/2017	Haylie Wagner	Pennsylvania Rebellion	Free Agency	Haylie Wagner Granted Free Agency Upon Dissolution of Rebellion
01/15/2017	Olivia Watkins	Pennsylvania Rebellion	Free Agency	Olivia Watkins Granted Free Agency Upon Dissolution of Rebellion
01/15/2017	Emily Weiman	Pennsylvania Rebellion	Free Agency	Emily Weiman Granted Free Agency Upon Dissolution of Rebellion
01/15/2017	Kayla Winkfield	Pennsylvania Rebellion	Free Agency	Kayla Winkfield Granted Free Agency Upon Dissolution of Rebellion
01/15/2017	Brittany Gomez	Pennsylvania Rebellion	Free Agency	Brittany Gomez Granted Free Agency Upon Dissolution of Rebellion
01/15/2017	Victoria Hayward	Pennsylvania Rebellion	Free Agency	Victoria Hayward Granted Free Agency Upon Dissolution of Rebellion
01/15/2017	Emma Johnson	Pennsylvania Rebellion	Free Agency	Emma Johnson Granted Free Agency Upon Dissolution of Rebellion
01/15/2017	Miranda Kramer	Pennsylvania Rebellion	Free Agency	Miranda Kramer Granted Free Agency Upon Dissolution of Rebellion
01/15/2017	Mandy Ogle	Pennsylvania Rebellion	Free Agency	Mandy Ogle Granted Free Agency Upon Dissolution of Rebellion
01/15/2017	Madison Osias	Pennsylvania Rebellion	Free Agency	Madison Osias Granted Free Agency Upon Dissolution of Rebellion
01/15/2017	Alexa Peterson	Pennsylvania Rebellion	Free Agency	Alexa Peterson Granted Free Agency Upon Dissolution of Rebellion
01/15/2017	Stacey Porter	Pennsylvania Rebellion	Free Agency	Stacey Porter Granted Free Agency Upon Dissolution of Rebellion
01/15/2017	Caitlin Attfield	Pennsylvania Rebellion	Free Agency	Caitlin Attfield Granted Free Agency Upon Dissolution of Rebellion
01/15/2017	Whitney Arion	Pennsylvania Rebellion	Free Agency	Whitney Arion Granted Free Agency Upon Dissolution of Rebellion
01/15/2017	Chaley Brickey	Pennsylvania Rebellion	Free Agency	Chaley Brickey Granted Free Agency Upon Dissolution of Rebellion
01/15/2017	Dallas Escobedo	Pennsylvania Rebellion	Free Agency	Dallas Escobedo Granted Free Agency Upon Dissolution of Rebellion
01/15/2017	Chelsea Forkin	Pennsylvania Rebellion	Free Agency	Chelsea Forkin Granted Free Agency Upon Dissolution of Rebellion
01/15/2017	Lexi Elkins	Pennsylvania Rebellion	Free Agency	Lexi Elkins Granted Free Agency Upon Dissolution of Rebellion
01/15/2017	Hayley Flynn	Pennsylvania Rebellion	Free Agency	Hayley Flynn Granted Free Agency Upon Dissolution of Rebellion
01/15/2017	Alisa Goler	Pennsylvania Rebellion	Free Agency	Alisa Goler Granted Free Agency Upon Dissolution of Rebellion
01/13/2017	Lindsey Stephens	Texas Charge	Trade	Caitlin Attfield, Chelsea Forkin, Vanessa Stokes Traded from Charge to Rebellion in exchange for Lindsey Stephens and Cheyenne Cordes
01/13/2017	Cheyenne Cordes	Texas Charge	Trade	Caitlin Attfield, Chelsea Forkin, Vanessa Stokes Traded from Charge to Rebellion in exchange for Lindsey Stephens and Cheyenne Cordes
01/13/2017	Vanessa Stokes	Pennsylvania Rebellion	Trade	Caitlin Attfield, Chelsea Forkin, Vanessa Stokes Traded from Charge to Rebellion in exchange for Lindsey Stephens and Cheyenne Cordes
01/13/2017	Chelsea Forkin	Pennsylvania Rebellion	Trade	Caitlin Attfield, Chelsea Forkin, Vanessa Stokes Traded from Charge to Rebellion in exchange for Lindsey Stephens and Cheyenne Cordes
01/13/2017	Caitlin Attfield	Pennsylvania Rebellion	Trade	Caitlin Attfield, Chelsea Forkin, Vanessa Stokes Traded from Charge to Rebellion in exchange for Lindsey Stephens and Cheyenne Cordes
01/11/2017	Haylie McCleney	Texas Charge	Trade	Chelsea Thomas and Haylie McCleney Traded to Charge in exchange for Charge 2017 1st pick in the 1st round (2nd overall pick) of the 2017 NPF Draft
01/11/2017	Chelsea Thomas	Texas Charge	Trade	Chelsea Thomas and Haylie McCleney Traded to Charge in exchange for Charge 2017 1st pick in the 1st round (2nd overall pick) of the 2017 NPF Draft
01/11/2017	Jackie Traina	Scrap Yard Dawgs	Franchise Player Tag	Dawgs place Franchise Player Tag on Jackie Traina
01/03/2017	Jessica Garcia	USSSA Florida Pride	Retirement	Jessica Garcia Retires from National Pro Fastpitch
12/16/2016	Katie Cotta	Texas Charge	Signing	Katie Cotta Signs with Charge thru 2017 season
12/15/2016	Ashley Burkhardt	Texas Charge	Release	Ashley Burkhardt Released from Charge
11/07/2016	Harmony Schwethelm	Texas Charge	Signing	Harmony Schwethelm Signs with Charge thru 2017 season
11/04/2016	Brittany Schutte	Texas Charge	Release	Brittany Schutte Released from Charge
10/28/2016	Ally Carda	Texas Charge	Signing	Ally Carda Signs with Charge thru 2017 season
10/25/2016	Kahley Novak	Texas Charge	Release	Kahley Novak Released from Charge
10/17/2016	Missy Taukeiaho	Texas Charge	Signing	Missy Taukeiaho Signs with Charge thru 2019 season
10/13/2016	Brianna Cherry	Texas Charge	Release	Brianna Cherry Released from Charge
10/08/2016	Mysha Sataraka	Texas Charge	Signing	Mysha Sataraka Signs with Charge thru 2018 season
10/07/2016	Andi Williamson	Texas Charge	Release	Andi Williamson Released from Charge
09/20/2016	Cheridan Hawkins	Scrap Yard Dawgs	Trade	Dawgs Trade Breja'e Washington and 6th Round Draft Pick in the 2018 NPF Draft to Charge for Morgan Melloh and Cheridan Hawkins
09/20/2016	Morgan Melloh	Scrap Yard Dawgs	Trade	Dawgs Trade Breja'e Washington and 6th Round Draft Pick in the 2018 NPF Draft to Charge for Morgan Melloh and Cheridan Hawkins
09/20/2016	Breja'e Washington	Dallas Charge	Trade	Dawgs Trade Breja'e Washington and 6th Round Draft Pick in the 2018 NPF Draft to Charge for Morgan Melloh and Cheridan Hawkins
09/19/2016	Ellen Renfroe	Scrap Yard Dawgs	Retirement	Ellen Reed Retires from National Pro Fastpitch
09/19/2016	Emily Koerner	Scrap Yard Dawgs	Extension	Emily Koerner Extends Contact with Dawgs thru 2018 season
09/15/2016	Mikey Kenney	Dallas Charge	Release	Mikey Kenney Released from Charge
09/13/2016	Koral Costa	Dallas Charge	Signing	Koral Costa Signs with Charge thru 2019 season
08/24/2016	Kelly Kretschman	USSSA Florida Pride	Extension	Kelly Kretschman Extends Contract with Pride thru 2019 season
08/24/2016	GiOnna DiSalvatore	USSSA Florida Pride	Extension	GiOnna DiSalvatore Extends Contract with Pride thru 2018 season
08/24/2016	Andrea Duran	USSSA Florida Pride	Extension	Andrea Duran Extends Contract with Pride thru 2018 season
08/24/2016	Chelsea Goodacre	USSSA Florida Pride	Extension	Chelsea Goodacre Extends Contract with Pride thru 2018 season
08/24/2016	Keilani Ricketts	USSSA Florida Pride	Extension	Keilani Ricketts Extends Contract with Pride thru 2018 season
08/24/2016	Hannah Rogers	USSSA Florida Pride	Extension	Hannah Rogers Extends Contract with Pride thru 2018 season
08/24/2016	Jordan Taylor	USSSA Florida Pride	Extension	Jordan Taylor Extends Contract with Pride thru 2018 season
08/24/2016	Chelsea Thomas	USSSA Florida Pride	Extension	Chelsea Thomas Extends Contract with Pride thru 2018 season
08/24/2016	Megan Wiggins	USSSA Florida Pride	Extension	Megan Wiggins Extends Contract with Pride thru 2018 season
08/24/2016	Hallie Wilson	USSSA Florida Pride	Extension	Hallie Wilson Extends Contract with Pride thru 2018 season
