= List of Oklahoma Sooners softball statistical leaders =

Team records of Oklahoma softball

This a list of records of the Oklahoma Sooners softball program includes batting and pitching records for both individual players and the team as a whole. Within those areas, the lists identify single-game, single-season, and career leaders.

Jocelyn Alo holds the NCAA Division I softball home run record with 122. She passed Lauren Chamberlain, who hit 95, on March 11, 2022.

== Key ==
**Bold**	NCAA record

== Batting ==
=== Batting average ===
Career
Rank	Player	Record	Years
1	Jocelyn Alo	.445	2018–2022
2	Jayda Coleman	.415	2021–2024
3	Tiare Jennings	.412	2021–2024
4	Rylie Boone	.407	2020–2024
5	Norrelle Dickson	.402	2004–2007

Single-season
Rank	Player	Record	Year
1	Jocelyn Alo	.515	2022
2	Jocelyn Alo	.475	2021
3	Tiare Jennings	.462	2021
4	Lauren Chamberlain	.458	2013
5	Norrelle Dickson	.453	2007

=== Home runs ===
Career
Rank	Player	Record	Years
1	Jocelyn Alo	**122**	2018–2022
2	Tiare Jennings	98	2021–2024
3	Lauren Chamberlain	95	2012–2015
4	Shelby Pendley	65	2013–2015
5	Jessica Shults	61	2010–2013

Single-season
Rank	Player	Record	Year
1	Jocelyn Alo	34	2022
1	Jocelyn Alo	34	2021
3	Jocelyn Alo	30	2018
3	Lauren Chamberlain	30	2013
3	Lauren Chamberlain	30	2012

=== Run batted in ===
Career
Rank	Player	Record	Years
1	Jocelyn Alo	323	2018–2022
2	Tiare Jennings	314	2021–2024
3	Lauren Chamberlain	254	2012–2015
4	Samantha Ricketts	239	2006–2009
5	Jessica Shults	230	2010–2013

Single-season
Rank	Player	Record	Year
1	Tiare Jennings	92	2021
2	Jocelyn Alo	89	2021
3	Tiare Jennings	87	2022
4	Jocelyn Alo	85	2022
5	Lauren Chamberlain	84	2013

=== Stolen bases ===
Career
Rank	Player	Record	Years
1	Norrelle Dickson	110	2004–2007
2	Christy Ring	86	1999–2002
3	LaKisha Washington	74	1998–2001
4	Erin Evans	69	2003–2003
5	Brianna Turang	64	2010–2013

Single-season
Rank	Player	Record	Year
1	Angie Holwell	46	1997
2	Norrelle Dickson	37	2007
3	Kristin Vesely	32	2005
4	Christy Ring	32	2000
5	LaKisha Washington	28	1998

== Pitching ==
=== Wins ===
Career
Rank	Player	Record	Years
1	Keilani Ricketts	133	2010–2013
2	Paige Parker	123	2015–2018
3	Jennifer Stewart	115	1999–2002
4	Kami Keiter	101	2002–2005
5	D.J. Mathis	76	2006–2009
5	Jill Most	76	1994–1997

Single-season
Rank	Player	Record	Year
1	Paige Parker	38	2016
1	Kelsey Stevens	38	2014
3	Keilani Ricketts	37	2012
3	Lauren Eckermann	37	2007
3	Jennifer Stewart	37	2001

=== Earned run average ===
Career
Rank	Player	Record	Year(s)
1	Kerri Mulry	0.56	1986
2	Jordy Bahl	0.99	2022–2023
3	Paige Lowary	1.35	2017–2018
4	Paige Parker	1.41	2015–2018
5	Shannon Saile	1.49	2019–2021

Single-season
Rank	Player	Record	Year
1	Patti Graham	0.54	1984
2	Kerri Mulry	0.56	1986
3	Sybil Richards	0.66	1983
4	Kami Keiter	0.71	2002
5	Patti Graham	0.76	1983

=== Saves ===
Career
Rank	Player	Record	Year(s)
1	Paige Lowary	18	2017–2018
2	Shannon Saile	11	2019–2021
3	Kami Keiter	9	2002–2005
4	Keilani Ricketts	8	2010–2013
5	Nicole May	6	2020–2024
5	Paige Parker	6	2015–2018
5	Lana Moran	6	1997–2000

Single-season
Rank	Player	Record	Year
1	Paige Lowary	11	2017
2	Paige Lowary	7	2018
3	Shannon Saile	5	2020
4	Jordy Bahl	4	2023
4	Shannon Saile	4	2019
4	Shelby Pendley	4	2014

=== Innings pitched ===
Career
Rank	Player	Record	Years
1	Keilani Ricketts	1074.1	2010–2013
2	Keilani Ricketts	928.2	1999–2002
3	Kami Keiter	910.1	2002–1997
4	Paige Parker	867.1	2015–2018
5	Patti Graham	807.1	1981–1984

Single-season
Rank	Player	Record	Year
1	Cheryl Jacobs	335.1	1980
2	Jill Most	295.2	1996
3	Kami Keiter	294.1	2003
4	Keilani Ricketts	292.0	2012
5	Keilani Ricketts	284.1	2011

=== Strikeouts ===
Career
Rank	Player	Record	Years
1	Keilani Ricketts	1,605	2010–2013
2	Paige Parker	968	2015–2018
3	Jill Most	805	1994–1997
4	Kami Keiter	733	2002–2005
5	Jennifer Stewart	634	1999–2002

Single-season
Rank	Player	Record	Year
1	Keilani Ricketts	457	2012
2	Keilani Ricketts	452	2011
3	Jill Most	356	1996
4	Keilani Ricketts	350	2013
5	Keilani Ricketts	346	2010
