= 2017 NPF Draft =

2017 NPF College Draft

General information
- Sport: Softball
- Date: April 24, 2017
- Time: 7:00 pm CST
- Location: Nashville, Tennessee
- Network: NPFTV

Overview
- 26 total selections
- League: National Pro Fastpitch
- Teams: 5
- First selection: Jessica Burroughs P FSU selected by USSSA Pride
- Most selections: Akron Racers (8)
- Fewest selections: Chicago Bandits (3)

The 2017 NPF College Draft is the 14th annual collegiate draft for National Pro Fastpitch. It took place April 24, 2017 7:00 CT in Nashville, Tennessee at Acme Feed & Seed, a downtown entertainment venue. It was available for internet viewing via NPFTV, the league's streaming platform. The first selection was Jessica Burroughs of Florida State, picked by the USSSA Pride.

== Draft ==
With the dissolution of the Pennsylvania Rebellion, the draft was condensed to five rounds and any picks due to trades with the Rebellion were disregarded.

Drafting an athlete gives an NPF affiliate team the rights to that athlete for two full seasons.

=== Draft selections ===
Position key:

C = catcher; INF = infielder; SS = shortstop; OF = outfielder; UT = Utility infielder; P = pitcher; RHP = right-handed pitcher; LHP = left-handed pitcher
Positions will be listed as combined for those who can play multiple positions.

| ^{+} | Denotes player who has been selected to at least one All-NPF team |
| ^{#} | Denotes player who has not played in the NPF |

==== Round 1 ====
| Pick | Player | Pos. | NPF Team | College |
|---|---|---|---|---|
| 1 | Jessica Burroughs^{+} | Pitcher | USSSA Florida Pride (Note: Texas Charge → USSSA Florida Pride 11 January 2017: Pride trade Chelsea Thomas and Haylie McCleney to Charge in exchange for Charge's 2017 1st pick in the 1st round of the 2017 NPF Draft) | Florida State |
| 2 | Sara Groenewegen^{+} | Pitcher | Akron Racers | Minnesota |
| 3 | Sahvanna Jaquish^{+} | Catcher/Infield | Chicago Bandits | LSU |
| 4 | Sierra Hyland | Pitcher/First Base | Chicago Bandits (Note: Scrap Yard Dawgs → Chicago Bandits 5 May 2016: Due to signing a franchise tagged player (Monica Abbott), the Dawgs forfeited their first-round pick in 2017 to the Bandits.) | Cal Poly |
| 5 | Bailey Landry | Outfield | Texas Charge (Note: USSSA Florida Pride → Texas Charge 10 May 2016: Due to signing a franchise tagged player (Jolene Henderson), the Pride forfeited their first-round pick in 2017 to the Charge.) | LSU |

==== Round 2 ====
| Pick | Player | Pos. | NPF Team | College |
|---|---|---|---|---|
| 6 | Katiyana Mauga | Third Base | Texas Charge | Arizona |
| 7 | Megan Betsa | Pitcher | Akron Racers | Michigan |
| 8 | Danielle O'Toole | Pitcher | Chicago Bandits | Arizona |
| 9 | Mo Mercado | Infield | USSSA Florida Pride (Note: USSSA Florida Pride → Scrap Yard Dawgs 8 April 2016: USSSA Florida Pride trade Madison Shipman and Brigette Del Ponte to Scrap Yard Dawgs in exchange for the 2016 13th Overall Draft Pick and the 2017 2nd and 3rd Round Draft Pick) | Arizona |
| 10 | Alex Powers | First Base | USSSA Florida Pride | Florida State |

==== Round 3 ====
| Pick | Player | Pos. | NPF Team | College |
|---|---|---|---|---|
| 11 | Chloe Miller | Catcher | Akron Racers | Wisconsin |
| 12 | Delanie Gourley | Pitcher | Scrap Yard Dawgs (Note: Gourley traded to the Texas Charge in exchange for Charge's 3rd and 5th Round Picks) (Note: Scrap Yard Dawgs → Chicago Bandits 26 January 2017: Dawgs Trade Taylore Fuller, Emily Crane, 2018 Dawgs 1st Round Draft Pick, and $10,000 in Exchange for Bandits Taylor Edwards, Brittany Cervantes, 2017 Bandits 3rd Round Draft Pick (#12 overall) and 2017 Bandits 4th Round Draft Pick (#17 overall)) | Florida |
| 13 | Ali Aguilar^{#} | Shortstop | Scrap Yard Dawgs (Note: Scrap Yard Dawgs → USSSA Florida Pride → Texas Charge 8 April 2016: USSSA Florida Pride trade Madison Shipman and Brigette Del Ponte to Scrap Yard Dawgs in exchange for the 2016 13th Overall Draft Pick and the 2017 2nd and 3rd Round Draft Pick 18 April 2017:USSSA Florida Pride Pride Trade Lauren Sweet and their 13th and 14th Overall Picks in 2017 Draft In Exchange For Texas Charge 20th Overall Pick in the 2017 Draft and 1st Pick in the 2nd Round of the 2018 Draft) (Note: Scrap Yard Dawgs → Texas Charge 24 April 2017: After the Dawgs drafted Delanie Gourley, she was traded to the Charge for the 13th and 25th picks.) | Washington |
| 14 | Haley Chambers-Book^{#} | Pitcher | Texas Charge (Note: USSSA Florida Pride → Texas Charge 18 April 2017:USSSA Florida Pride Pride Trade Lauren Sweet and their 13th and 14th Overall Picks in 2017 Draft In Exchange For Texas Charge 20th Overall Pick in the 2017 Draft and 1st Pick in the 2nd Round of the 2018 Draft) | SIU-Edwardsville |
| 15 | Megan Geer | Outfield | Akron Racers (Note: Texas Charge → Akron Racers 24 January 2017: Akron Racers Trade Haley Outon to Texas Charge in exchange for Charge's 3rd Round Pick (#15 overall pick) in the 2017 NPF College Draft) | Tennessee |

==== Round 4 ====
| Pick | Player | Pos. | NPF Team | College |
|---|---|---|---|---|
| 16 | Sydni Emanuel^{#} | Outfield | Akron Racers | Georgia |
| 17 | Hannah Flippen^{+} | Infield | Scrap Yard Dawgs (Note: Scrap Yard Dawgs → Chicago Bandits 26 January 2017: Dawgs Trade Taylore Fuller, Emily Crane, 2018 Dawgs 1st Round Draft Pick, and $10,000 in Exchange for Bandits Taylor Edwards, Brittany Cervantes, 2017 Bandits 3rd Round Draft Pick (#12 overall) and 2017 Bandits 4th Round Draft Pick (#17 overall)) | Utah |
| 18 | Nikki Udria^{#} | Shortstop | Scrap Yard Dawgs | Oregon |
| 19 | Mandie Perez | Outfield | USSSA Florida Pride | Arizona |
| 20 | Kelly Christner^{#} | Outfield | USSSA Florida Pride (Note: USSSA Florida Pride → Texas Charge 18 April 2017:USSSA Florida Pride Pride Trade Lauren Sweet and their 13th and 14th Overall Picks in 2017 Draft In Exchange For Texas Charge 20th Overall Pick in the 2017 Draft and 1st Pick in the 2nd Round of the 2018 Draft) | Michigan |

==== Round 5 ====
| Pick | Player | Pos. | NPF Team | College |
|---|---|---|---|---|
| 21 | Nicole Schroeder | Utility | Akron Racers | Arkansas |
| 22 | Lindsey Cargill^{#} | Utility | Texas Charge (Note: Texas Charge → Chicago Bandits 26 January 2017: Texas Charge Trade their 4th Round Pick in the 2018 NPF Draft to the Bandits in Exchange for Amanda Kamekona, 2017 5th Round Pick (#22 overall), and 2017 5th Round Pick (#25 overall)) | Baylor |
| 23 | Maddy Grimm | Infield | Akron Racers (Note: Akron Racers → Scrap Yard Dawgs 18 January 2016: Akron Racers traded Nerissa Myers to the Scrap Yard Dawgs for the 1st Selection in 4th Round of 2016 Draft and 1st Selection in 5th Round of 2017 Draft.) | Kent State |
| 24 | Alexis Silkwood | Pitcher/Outfield | Akron Racers (Note: Akron Racers → USSSA Florida Pride 11 February 2016: USSSA Florida Pride trade their 2017 NPF College Draft - 5th Round Pick to the Akron Racers in exchange for Jessica Garcia) | Mississippi State |
| 25 | MJ Knighten | Third Base | Scrap Yard Dawgs (Note: Pick traded by Charge for Delanie Gourley). (Note: Texas Charge → Chicago Bandits 26 January 2017: Texas Charge Trade their 4th Round Pick in the 2018 NPF Draft to the Bandits in Exchange for Amanda Kamekona, 2017 5th Round Pick (#22 overall), and 2017 5th Round Pick (#25 overall)) | Nebraska |
| 26 | Morgan Zerkle | Utility | Scrap Yard Dawgs | Marshall |

==== Draft notes ====
Round 1:

Round 2:

Round 3:

Round 4:

Round 5:

Round 6:
