= 2013 NPF Draft =

2013 NPF College Draft

General information
- Sport: softball
- Date: April 1, 2013
- Time: 8:00 PM ET
- Location: Nashville, Tennessee
- Network: ESPN3

Overview
- 20 total selections
- League: National Pro Fastpitch
- Teams: 4
- First selection: Rachele Fico P LSU selected by Akron Racers
- Most selections: Akron Racers, Chicago Bandits; 6 picks each
- Fewest selections: USSSA Pride, 3 picks

The 2013 NPF Draft is the tenth annual NPF Draft. It was held April 1, 2013 8:00 PM ET in Nashville, TN at the Ford Theatre at the Country Music Hall of Fame and Museum. It was broadcast on ESPN3. The first selection was LSU's Rachele Fico, picked by the Akron Racers.

== 2013 NPF Draft ==
Position key:
C = catcher; INF = infielder; SS = shortstop; OF = outfielder; UT = Utility infielder; P = pitcher; RHP = right-handed pitcher; LHP = left-handed pitcher
Positions will be listed as combined for those who can play multiple positions.

^{+}	Denotes player who has been selected to at least one All-NPF team
^{#}	Denotes player who has not played in the NPF

=== Round 1 ===
Pick	Player	Pos.	NPF Team	College
1	Rachele Fico^{+}	P	Akron Racers	LSU
2	Olivia Galati^{+}	P	NY/NJ Comets	Hofstra
3	Jolene Henderson^{+}	P	Chicago Bandits (Note: Henderson did not play for the Bandits, but did play in the NPF beginning in 2015.)	California
4	Keilani Ricketts^{+}	P	USSSA Florida Pride	Oklahoma

=== Round 2 ===
Pick	Player	Pos.	NPF Team	College
5	Jessica Shults	C	USSSA Florida Pride	Oklahoma
6	Jessica Moore^{#}	P	NY/NJ Comets	Oregon
7	Michelle Gascoigne^{+}	P	Chicago Bandits	Oklahoma
8	Ivy Renfroe	P	Akron Racers	Tennessee

=== Round 3 ===
Pick	Player	Pos.	NPF Team	College
9	Brianna Turang	OF	Akron Racers	Oklahoma
10	Cyndil Matthew	OF	NY/NJ Comets	UMass
11	Maggie Hull	OF	Chicago Bandits	Kansas
12	Briana Cherry	OF	Akron Racers	Louisiana–Lafayette

=== Round 4 ===
Pick	Player	Pos.	NPF Team	College
13	Raven Chavanne	OF/3B	Chicago Bandits (Note: Chavanne did not play for the Bandits, but did play in the NPF with the Pennsylvania Rebellion in 2016.)	Tennessee
14	Samie Garcia	SS	NY/NJ Comets	South Carolina
15	Mel Dumezich	P	Chicago Bandits	Texas A&M
16	Tess Sito	U/P	Akron Racers	Georgia

=== Round 5 ===
Pick	Player	Pos.	NPF Team	College
17	Bridgette Del Ponte	3B/SS	Akron Racers	Arizona
18	Courtney Liddle	1B	NY/NJ Comets	Virginia Tech
19	Jenna Marston^{#}	SS/C	Chicago Bandits	Missouri
20	Chelsea Thomas	P	USSSA Florida Pride	Missouri
