= 2008 NPF Draft =

General information
- Sport: softball
- Date: February 18, 2008

Overview
- 24 total selections
- League: National Pro Fastpitch
- Teams: 6
- First selection: Katie Burkhart P Arizona State selected by Philadelphia Force
- Most selections: Akron Racers, 6 picks
- Fewest selections: New England Riptide, Washington Glory, Chicago Bandits; 3 picks each

The 2008 NPF Senior Draft is the fifth annual NPF Draft. It was held February 18, 2008 via conference call for the 2008 season. The first selection was Arizona State's Katie Burkhart, picked by the Philadelphia Force. Athletes are not allowed by the NCAA to sign professional contracts until their collegiate seasons have ended.

== 2008 NPF Draft ==
Following are the 24 selections from the 2008 NPF Senior Draft: Position key:
C = Catcher; UT = Utility infielder; INF = Infielder; 1B = First base; 2B =Second base SS = Shortstop; 3B = Third base; OF = Outfielder; RF = Right field; CF = Center field; LF = Left field; P = Pitcher; RHP = right-handed Pitcher; LHP = left-handed Pitcher; DP =Designated player
Positions are listed as combined for those who can play multiple positions.

^{+}	Denotes player who has been selected to at least one All-NPF team
^{#}	Denotes player who has not played in the NPF

=== Round 1 ===
Pick	Player	Pos.	NPF Team	College
1	Katie Burkhart^{+}	P	Philadelphia Force	Arizona State
2	Megan Gibson^{+}	P	Philadelphia Force	Texas A&M
3	Angela Tincher^{+}	P	Akron Racers	Virginia Tech
4	Anjelica Selden^{#}	P	New England Riptide	UCLA
5	Savannah Brown	C	Rockford Thunder	Georgia Tech
6	Taryne Mowatt	P	Washington Glory	Arizona

=== Round 2 ===
Pick	Player	Pos.	NPF Team	College
7	Rachel Folden^{+}	C	Chicago Bandits	Marshall
8	Savannah Long	INF	Philadelphia Force	Oklahoma
9	Emily Nichols	C	Chicago Bandits	Iowa
10	Aileen Morales	SS	Chicago Bandits	Georgia Tech
11	Kate Robinson	P/1B	Akron Racers	Hawai'i
12	Lauren Eckermann^{#}	P	Rockford Thunder	Oklahoma

=== Round 3 ===
Pick	Player	Pos.	NPF Team	College
13	Tonya Callahan^{+}	1B	Rockford Thunder	Tennessee
14	TJ Eadus	C	New England Riptide	Creighton
15	Shannon Doepking^{+}	C	Akron Racers	Tennessee
16	Courtney Bures	SS	Washington Glory	Mississippi State
17	Angelena Mexicano	SS	Akron Racers	Illinois
18	Susan Ogden^{#}	C	Akron Racers	Oklahoma

=== Round 4 ===
Pick	Player	Pos.	NPF Team	College
19	Sandy Vojik	UT	Rockford Thunder	DePaul
20	Beth Boden	SS	Rockford Thunder	Tennessee Tech
21	Tory Yamaguchi	C	Philadelphia Force	Indiana
22	Jordan Praytor^{#}	UT	New England Riptide	Alabama
23	Brittany Barnes	INF	Akron Racers	Georgia Tech
24	Cambria Miranda^{#}	UT	Washington Glory	Oregon State
