= Kelly Barnhill (softball) =

American softball pitcher

- Pitcher
- Born: March 31, 1997 (age 29); Marietta, Georgia, U.S.
- Batted: Right Threw: Right

NPF debut
- June 8, 2019, for the Chicago Bandits

Last Italian Softball League appearance
- 2024, for the Softball Forlì

Teams
- Chicago Bandits (2019); Xinliwang Lions (2020); Howick Softball Club (2022); New Taipei Cesar Warriors (2023); Softball Forlì (2024)

Career highlights and awards
- Best Female College Athlete ESPY Award (2017); USA Softball Collegiate Player of the Year (2017); Honda Sports Award (2017); espnW Player of the Year (2017); 2× SEC softball tournament champion (2018, 2019); SEC softball tournament MVP (2019); 2× NFCA All-American First Team (2017, 2018); NFCA All-American Second Team (2019); 2× SEC Pitcher of the Year (2017, 2018); 2× All-SEC First Team (2017, 2018); All-SEC Second Team (2019); SEC All-Freshman Team (2016); Academic All-American of the Year (2018)
Medals
Women's softball
Representing United States
WBSC Women's Softball World Championship
| Gold medal – first place | 2016 Surrey | Team |
| Gold medal – first place | 2018 Chiba | Team |
World Cup of Softball
| Gold medal – first place | 2015 Irvine | Team |
| Silver medal – second place | 2016 Oklahoma City | Team |
| Silver medal – second place | 2017 Oklahoma City | Team |
WBSC Junior Women's Softball World Championship
| Gold medal – first place | 2015 Oklahoma City | Team |

Kelly Katlyn Barnhill (born March 31, 1997) is an American attainable housing organization executive and former professional softball pitcher. She played college softball for the Florida Gators from 2016 to 2019, earning All-American honors during her tenure with the team. In 2017, she was widely recognized as the top player in collegiate softball, being named the USA Softball Collegiate Player of the Year and espnW Player of the Year, as well as winning the Honda Sports Award. Additionally, she won an ESPY Award for Best Female College Athlete. Barnhill ranks as the Gators' career leader in no hitters, strikeouts, strikeout ratio, and WHIP.

Barnhill was selected first overall by the Chicago Bandits in the 2019 NPF Draft. Barnhill has also played softball for Team USA.

== Early life and high school ==
Born and raised in Marietta, Georgia, Barnhill tried out many sports in her youth, beginning with soccer. She would eventually drop soccer in favor of softball, citing that there was "way too much running" in soccer. She played travel ball with the EC Bullets Gold and attended Pope High School in Marietta, where she recorded 22 no-hitters and was a three-time school-wide MVP. She led Pope to the 2014 class 6A state championship. Barnhill considered attending Stanford University, but committed to the University of Florida in October 2014, during her senior year of high school.

Barnhill's high school softball play was nationally recognized—in 2015, she was named the Georgia Gatorade Player of the Year and the USA Today Softball Player of the Year. She was also named a National Fastpitch Coaches Association (NFCA) and Louisville Slugger High School All-American. In 2013 and 2014, she was a candidate for the Georgia Gatorade Player of the Year before being named in 2015.

== College career ==
=== 2016 ===
A 5 ft 8 in (1.73 m) right-handed pitcher, Barnhill played her freshman season for the Florida Gators in 2016. During the year, she was twice named the SEC Freshman of the Week. She was named to the 2016 SEC First Year Academic Honor Roll, as well as the 2016 SEC All-Freshman Team. She finished her freshman season with a 15–1 record, as well as 167 strikeouts and an opponent batting average of .140 in 108.1 innings pitched.

=== 2017 ===
In 2017, Barnhill led the NCAA in earned run average (ERA) and strikeouts per seven innings (0.51 and 13.0, respectively). Those statistics were records among University of Florida pitchers; Barnhill set additional school records in lowest opponent batting average (.121), most combined shutouts (10), most strikeouts looking (100) and lowest stolen base percentage (.333). She was named an All-SEC First Team player. Heading into the SEC Tournament, the Gators were ranked No. 1 in the nation, and Barnhill was named the SEC Pitcher of the Year. Florida was a No. 1 seed in the Women's College World Series (WCWS) and during their run, defeated Alabama 2–1 to advance to the final. The Gators matched up against Oklahoma for the best-of-three championship series, losing the first game 5–7 in a 17-inning bout. Florida was then swept by Oklahoma, losing the second game 4–5. Barnhill was named to the WCWS All-Tournament Team.

Her ERA during the season was noted by sports outlets, espnW commented in April that "the company she keeps in ERA at the moment is the context by which it is clear that she is the nation's best pitcher." espnW later named her their Softball Player of the Year, describing her as "NCAA softball's most statistically dominant pitching presence in a decade." She won the Honda Sports Award as the nation's top softball player. She was also named the USA Softball Collegiate Player of the Year in 2017. The NFCA named her a first-team All-American. On July 12, 2017, she was awarded the ESPY Award for Best Female College Athlete, for the 2017 season. She was the first player in Florida's softball program history to win an ESPY award.

=== 2018 ===
On February 25, 2018, Barnhill pitched her first perfect game in an 8–0 shutout win over Georgia Southern. Barnhill was an academic honoree in 2018. She was also named the NCAA Division I Academic All-American of the Year in softball. Barnhill also earned her second All-SEC First Team and SEC Pitcher of the Year selections. The Gators enjoyed team success as well, as they won the 2018 SEC softball tournament. She was once again named a first-team All-American by the NFCA.

=== 2019 ===
Entering her senior year, Barnhill became a founding member of UF's Alpha Phi chapter. Barnhill played her fourth and final season of collegiate softball in 2019. On April 26, playing against Auburn, Barnhill recorded her 1,117th career strikeout, setting the UF record. She was named to the All-SEC Second Team, as well as her third consecutive SEC Academic Honor Roll. The NFCA named her a second-team All-American.

The Gators defeated the Alabama Crimson Tide to win their second consecutive SEC tournament championship. Barnhill was named the MVP of the tournament. Her final collegiate game was also against Alabama, this time in the Women's College World Series. The Gators suffered a 15–3 defeat to Alabama and the game marked one of Barnhill's shortest outings in her career. At the end of her Gators softball career, she held school records in ERA (0.92), opponent batting average (.134), and strikeouts (1,208). She finished her Gators career as the Florida program's career strikeouts leader. She also finished her career ranked highly in career strikeouts and strikeout ratio among players in both the Southeastern Conference (SEC) and NCAA Division I.

== Professional career ==
On April 16, 2019, the Chicago Bandits of the National Pro Fastpitch league selected Barnhill first overall in the 2019 NPF Draft. Her teammate at Florida, Amanda Lorenz, was selected directly after her by the USSSA Pride. She made her debut on June 8, tossing 4.2 innings against the Cleveland Comets. The Bandits finished with the best regular season record in the 2019 NPF season, but went on to be swept by the Pride in the best-of-five championship series. Barnhill finished her rookie season with a 4–0 record, a 2.43 ERA, and 52 strikeouts in 44.2 innings.

Barnhill signed a one-year extension with the Bandits on February 10, 2020. However, the league's 2020 and 2021 seasons were cancelled due to the COVID-19 pandemic, leading to the league folding in 2021. In 2020, she participated in the inaugural Athletes Unlimited Pro Softball AUX league. Barnhill made 11 appearances and 5 starts, finishing with a 3–1 win–loss record, 8.04 ERA, and 24 strikeouts.

Barnhill later played professionally overseas. In 2020, she played for the Xinliwang Lions of the Taiwan Professional Women's Softball League (TPWSL), after the league became the first in the world to start their season following the onset of the COVID-19 pandemic. As an import player, Barnhill completed a 14-day quarantine. In her debut with the Lions on May 25, she recorded 18 strikeouts, setting the league's single-game strikeout record. In 2022, she played for the Howick Softball Club in New Zealand. She again played in the TPWSL in 2023. She strongly considered retiring after her season in Taiwan, citing losing a love of softball. However, she ultimately played one final season of professional softball in 2024, for Softball Forlì, a club in the Italian Women's Softball League. She announced her retirement from professional softball on June 3, 2024. She also played professionally in the Netherlands, Colombia, and Australia.

== National team career ==
Barnhill represented Team USA on multiple occasions, beginning in 2015, when she was a member of the women's junior national softball team. That year she was a gold medalist at the 2015 World Baseball Softball Confederation (WBSC) Junior Women's Softball World Championship. During that competition, Barnhill led the U.S. pitching staff with a 6–0 record, 51 strikeouts and a 0.54 ERA in 26 innings pitched. At the 2016 WBSC Women's Softball World Championship, Barnhill was a gold medalist, pitching four innings with four strikeouts and two hits allowed. Barnhill again represented the women's national softball team during their second consecutive gold medal run in 2018. During the competition, she pitched seven innings with eight strikeouts and a 0.00 ERA.

Barnhil also represented USA Women's national softball team at World Cup of Softball competitions. She was a member of the team during three of their runs, winning a gold medal in 2015 and two silver medals in 2016 and 2017.

Barnhill's national team experience also includes the Pan American Women's Softball Championship; in the competition's 2017 final, Barnhill pitched a no-hitter as the U.S. defeated Mexico 9–0. Barnhill later pitched for the Mexican national team in a 2020 exhibition game against Ole Miss.

== Outside of softball ==
Barnhill studied public relations while at Florida, and later attended the University of Oklahoma for graduate school studies. After retiring from softball, Barnhill became the executive director for Housing and Workforce Collective Solutions (HAWCS), an attainable housing organization based in Athens, Georgia.

== Career statistics ==
Legend
| W | Wins | L | Losses | GP | Games pitched | GS | Games started | CG | Complete games |
| SHO | Shutouts | SV | Saves | IP | Innings pitched | H | Hits allowed | R | Runs allowed |
| ER | Earned run | BB | Base on balls | SO | Strikeouts | ERA | Earned run average | WHIP | Walks plus hits per innings pitched |

=== AUX ===
| **Bold** | Denotes career high or best |

| Year | W | L | GP | GS | CG | SHO | SV | IP | H | R | ER | BB | SO | ERA | WHIP |
|---|---|---|---|---|---|---|---|---|---|---|---|---|---|---|---|
| 2020 | 3 | 1 | 11 | 5 | – | – | – | 27.0 | 34 | 33 | 31 | 20 | 24 | 8.04 | – |
| **Career** | 3 | 1 | 11 | 5 | – | – | – | 27.0 | 34 | 33 | 31 | 20 | 24 | 8.04 | – |
Statistics gathered from AUSL.

=== College ===
| **Bold** | Denotes career high or best |
| * | Led Division I |

| Year | Team | W | L | GP | GS | CG | SHO | SV | IP | H | R | ER | BB | SO | ERA | WHIP |
|---|---|---|---|---|---|---|---|---|---|---|---|---|---|---|---|---|
| 2016 | Florida | 15 | 1 | 27 | 24 | 7 | 6 | 1 | 108.1 | 52 | 24 | 21 | 55 | 167 | 1.36 | 0.99 |
| 2017 | Florida | 26 | 4 | 37 | 30 | 17 | 13 | **3** | 193.2 | 79 | 22 | 14 | 39 | **359** | **0.51*** | **0.61** |
| 2018 | Florida | 29 | 3 | 41 | 38 | 23 | 11 | 0 | 214.1 | 85 | 46 | 33 | 76 | 324 | 1.08 | 0.75 |
| 2019 | Florida | **34** | **14** | **52** | **45** | **29** | **14** | **3** | **287.0** | **150** | **70** | **66** | **81** | 358 | 1.61 | 0.80 |
| **Career** | | 104 | 22 | 157 | 137 | 76 | 44 | 7 | 803.1 | 366 | 162 | 134 | 251 | 1,208 | 1.17 | 0.77 |
Statistics gathered from D1 Softball.

== See also ==
- List of NCAA Division I softball career strikeout leaders
- List of NCAA Division I softball career win leaders
- List of Softball Academic All-America Team Members of the Year
