= Taiwan Professional Women's Softball League =

Taiwanese women's softball league

- Upcoming season or competition: 2025 Taiwan Professional Women's Softball League season
- Sport: Softball
- Founded: 2016; 10 years ago
- Founder: Tsai Chi-chang
- First season: 2016
- No. of teams: 6
- Country: Taiwan
- Most recent champion: Fu-Tian-Fu Chia-Nan Eagles (6th title)
- Most titles: Fu-Tian-Fu Chia-Nan Eagles (6 titles)
- Broadcaster: Sportcast
- Website: tpwsl.com.tw/web/index.php

Taiwan women's softball league 2017

Taiwan Professional Women's Softball League (TPWSL), is a women's softball league in Taiwan. The TPWSL is founded in 2016 by the Chinese Taipei Amateur Softball Association.

== Teams ==
| Team | City |
|---|---|
| Chinese Taipei U18 | Taipei City |
| Fu-Tian-Fu Chia-Nan Eagles | Nantou County |
| New Century Wasps | Kaohsiung City |
| New Taipei Caesar Warriors | New Taipei City |
| Taipei TFMI Bravo Bears | Taipei City |
| Zongguanjia Leopard Cat | Taichung City |

=== Timeline ===
Current team Former team

== Stadiums ==
Locations of the 2025 Taiwan Professional Women's Softball League stadiums

Stadiums (2026)
| Stadium | Chinese | Location | Capacity |
|---|---|---|---|
| Feng-Hsin Softball Field | 鳳新壘球場 | Kaohsiung City | |
| Fuxing Softball Stadium | 福興壘球場 | Nantou County | |
| National Chi Nan University Softball Field | 國立暨南國際大學壘球場 | Nantou County | |
| New Taipei City SanChong Baseball Stadium | 新北市三重棒球場 | New Taipei City | 1,000 |
| Taichung International Softball Field | 臺中國際壘球運動園區 | Taichung City | 2,000 |
| Youth Park Hsieh Kuo-Cheng Memorial Baseball Stadium | 青年公園謝國城紀念棒球場 | Taipei City | 1,200 |

=== Former stadiums ===
| Stadium | Chinese | Location | Capacity |
|---|---|---|---|
| Bailing Riverside Park Softball Field | 百齡河濱公園壘球場 | Taipei City | |
| Chiayi City Municipal Baseball Stadium | 嘉義市立棒球場 | Chiayi City | 10,000 |
| Chin Lung Baseball Field | 金龍棒球場 | Taichung City | |
| Kaohsiung Li De Baseball Stadium | 立德棒球場 | Kaohsiung City | 2,700 |
| Xinsheng Park Baseball Field | 新生公園棒球場 | Taipei City | 450 |
| Wan-Shou Baseball Stadium | 萬壽棒球場 | Taichung City | 5,000 |

== Champions ==
| year | champion | runner up |
|---|---|---|
| 2016 | Nantou Eagles | Caesar Warriors |
| 2017 | Fu-Tian-Fu Chia-Nan Eagles | Caesar Warriors |
| 2018 | Caesar Warriors | Fu-Tian-Fu Chia-Nan Eagles |
| 2019 | New Century Wasps | Xinliwang Lions |
| 2020 | Fu-Tian-Fu Chia-Nan Eagles | New Century Wasps |
| 2021 | Fu-Tian-Fu Chia-Nan Eagles | New Century Wasps |
| 2022 | Fu-Tian-Fu Chia-Nan Eagles | New Century Wasps |
| 2023 | New Century Wasps | Fu-Tian-Fu Chia-Nan Eagles |
| 2024 | Campus Pangolins | New Taipei Caesar Warriors |
| 2025 | Fu-Tian-Fu Chia-Nan Eagles | New Century Wasps |

== Awards ==
=== MVP ===
| season | winner | team |
|---|---|---|
| 2016 | Lee Szu-Shih | Nantou Eagles |
| 2017 | Tu Ya-Ting | Fu-Tian-Fu Chia-Nan Eagles |
| 2018 | Veronika Pecková | Caesar Warriors |
| 2019 | Kaisey Carson | New Century Wasps |
| 2020 | Kaisey Carson | New Century Wasps |
| 2021 | Ko Hsia-Ai | Fu-Tian-Fu Chia-Nan Eagles |
| 2022 | Ko Hsia-Ai | Fu-Tian-Fu Chia-Nan Eagles |
| 2023 | Alyson Spinas-Valainis | New Century Wasps |
| 2024 | Ko Hsia-Ai | Fu-Tian-Fu Chia-Nan Eagles |
| 2025 | Lee Szu-Shih | Fu-Tian-Fu Chia-Nan Eagles |

=== Wins leader ===
| season | winner | team |
|---|---|---|
| 2016 | Lin Su-Hua | Nantou Eagles |
| 2017 | Tu Ya-Ting | Fu-Tian-Fu Chia-Nan Eagles |
| 2018 | Lin Su-Hua | Fu-Tian-Fu Chia-Nan Eagles |
| 2019 | Kaisey Carson | New Century Wasps |
| 2020 | Kaisey Carson | New Century Wasps |
| 2021 | Ko Hsia-Ai | Fu-Tian-Fu Chia-Nan Eagles |
| 2022 | Tsai Chia-Chen | New Century Wasps |
| 2023 | Alyson Spinas-Valainis | New Century Wasps |
| 2024 | Ko Hsia-Ai | Fu-Tian-Fu Chia-Nan Eagles |
| 2025 | Chen Ching-yu | Fu-Tian-Fu Chia-Nan Eagles |

=== ERA leader ===
| season | winner | team |
|---|---|---|
| 2016 | Yang Min-Chen | Caesar Warriors |
| 2017 | Tu Ya-Ting | Fu-Tian-Fu Chia-Nan Eagles |
| 2018 | Not awarded | |
| 2019 | Sierra Hyland | Xinliwang Lions |
| 2020 | Kaisey Carson | New Century Wasps |
| 2021 | Not awarded | |
| 2022 | Not awarded | |
| 2023 | Alyson Spinas-Valainis | New Century Wasps |
| 2024 | Ko Hsia-Ai | Fu-Tian-Fu Chia-Nan Eagles |
| 2025 | Ko Hsia-Ai | Fu-Tian-Fu Chia-Nan Eagles |

=== Batting average leader ===
| season | winner | team |
|---|---|---|
| 2016 | Shih Chia-Ching | Nantou Eagles |
| 2017 | Lee Szu-Shih | Fu-Tian-Fu Chia-Nan Eagles |
| 2018 | Lee Szu-Shih | Fu-Tian-Fu Chia-Nan Eagles |
| 2019 | Su Yi-Hsuan | Caesar Warriors |
| 2020 | Chen Chia-Yi | Caesar Warriors |
| 2021 | Chen Shih-Ting | New Century Wasps |
| 2022 | Ko Chia-Hui | Fu-Tian-Fu Chia-Nan Eagles |
| 2023 | Shen Chia-Wen | New Century Wasps |
| 2024 | Chen Chia-Yi | New Taipei Caesar Warriors |
| 2025 | Shen Chia-Wen | New Taipei Caesar Warriors |

=== Homerun leader ===
| season | winner | team |
|---|---|---|
| 2016 | Lee Szu-Shih | Nantou Eagles |
| 2017 | Lee Szu-Shih | Fu-Tian-Fu Chia-Nan Eagles |
| 2018 | Lee Szu-Shih | Fu-Tian-Fu Chia-Nan Eagles |
| 2019 | Lu Hsueh-Mei | New Century Wasps |
| 2020 | Lee Szu-Shih | Fu-Tian-Fu Chia-Nan Eagles |
| 2021 | Lee Szu-Shih | Fu-Tian-Fu Chia-Nan Eagles |
| 2022 | Chen Chia-Yi | New Taipei Caesar Warriors |
| 2023 | Lee Szu-Shih | Fu-Tian-Fu Chia-Nan Eagles |
| 2024 | Yeh Kuei-ping | Fu-Tian-Fu Chia-Nan Eagles |
| 2025 | Lee Szu-Shih | Fu-Tian-Fu Chia-Nan Eagles |

=== RBI leader ===
| season | winner | team |
|---|---|---|
| 2016 | Lee Szu-Shih | Nantou Eagles |
| 2017 | Lee Szu-Shih | Fu-Tian-Fu Chia-Nan Eagles |
| 2018 | Lee Szu-Shih | Fu-Tian-Fu Chia-Nan Eagles |
| 2019 | Lu Hsueh-Mei | New Century Wasps |
| 2020 | Lee Szu-Shih | Fu-Tian-Fu Chia-Nan Eagles |
| 2021 | Lee Szu-Shih | Fu-Tian-Fu Chia-Nan Eagles |
| 2022 | Lee Szu-Shih | Fu-Tian-Fu Chia-Nan Eagles |
| 2023 | Lee Szu-Shih | Fu-Tian-Fu Chia-Nan Eagles |
| 2024 | Chen Chia-Yi | New Taipei Caesar Warriors |
| 2025 | Lee Szu-Shih | Fu-Tian-Fu Chia-Nan Eagles |

=== Stolen base leader ===
| season | winner | team |
|---|---|---|
| 2016 | Lai Meng-Ting | Nantou Eagles |
| 2017 | Lai Meng-Ting | Fu-Tian-Fu Chia-Nan Eagles |
| 2018 | Reina Nomura | Caesar Warriors |
| 2018 | Chiang Ting-En | Caesar Warriors |
| 2018 | Lai Meng-Ting | Fu-Tian-Fu Chia-Nan Eagles |
| 2018 | Lin Yi-Ying | New Century Wasps |
| 2019 | Shen Chia-Wen | New Century Wasps |
| 2020 | Chiang Ting-En | Caesar Warriors |
| 2021 | Chang Chia-Yun | Fu-Tian-Fu Chia-Nan Eagles |
| 2022 | Chiang Ting-En | New Taipei Caesar Warriors |
| 2023 | Chiang Ting-En | New Taipei Caesar Warriors |
| 2024 | Chiang Ting-En | New Taipei Caesar Warriors |
| 2025 | Yeh Kuei-Ping | Fu-Tian-Fu Chia-Nan Eagles |

=== Strikeout leader ===
| season | winner | team |
|---|---|---|
| 2016 | Lin Ying-Hsin | UTaipei Bravo Bears |
| 2017 | Tu Ya-Ting | Fu-Tian-Fu Chia-Nan Eagles |
| 2018 | Veronika Pecková | Caesar Warriors |
| 2019 | Sierra Hyland | Xinliwang Lions |
| 2020 | Kelly Barnhill | Xinliwang Lions |
| 2021 | Lin Ying-Hsin | Taipei TFMI |
| 2022 | Ko Hsia-Ai | Fu-Tian-Fu Chia-Nan Eagles |
| 2023 | Kelly Barnhill | New Taipei Caesar Warriors |
| 2024 | Ellen Roberts | Taipei TFMI Bravo Bears |
| 2025 | Alyson Spinas Valainis | New Century Wasps |

=== Coach(es) of the year ===
| season | winner | team |
|---|---|---|
| 2016 | Tseng Hsin-Chang | Nantou Eagles |
| 2017 | Tseng Hsin-Chang | Fu-Tian-Fu Chia-Nan Eagles |
| 2018 | Lin Te-Lung | Caesar Warriors |
| 2019 | Wu Chia-Jung | New Century Wasps |
| 2020 | Tseng Hsin-Chang | Fu-Tian-Fu Chia-Nan Eagles |
| 2021 | Tseng Hsin-Chang; Chiang Tzu-Ling | Fu-Tian-Fu Chia-Nan Eagles |
| 2022 | Chang Ning-En; Huang Hui-Wen | Fu-Tian-Fu Chia-Nan Eagles |
| 2023 | Fu Ping-Ching; Su Chih-Jung | New Century Wasps |
| 2024 | Kao Chun-sheng | Campus Pangolins |
| 2024 | Han Hsin-lin | New Taipei Caesar Warriors |
| 2025 | Lin Pei-Chun | Fu-Tian-Fu Chia-Nan Eagles |
| 2025 | Fu Ping-Ching | New Century Wasps |

=== Best ten ===
| season | DP | P | C | 1B | 2B | 3B | SS | OF |
|---|---|---|---|---|---|---|---|---|
| 2016 | Chen Chia-Yi (Warriors) | Yang Min-Chen (Warriors) | Lee Szu-Shih (Eagles) | Chiang Hui-Chuan (Eagles) | Lin Feng-Chen (Warriors) | Shih Chieh-Pei (Bravo Bears) | Shih Chia-Ching (Eagles) | Chen Hsiao-Mei (Bravo Bears); Chou Yi-Hsuan (Jaguars); Lee Yu-Ting (Bravo Bears) |
| 2017 | Chen Chia-Yi (Warriors) | Tu Ya-Ting (Eagles) | Lee Szu-Shih (Eagles) | Shih Chieh-Pei (Bulldogs) | Lin Pei-Chun (Eagles) | Wang Hsiao-Chien (Wasps) | Lin Feng-Chen (Wasps) | Chen Hsiao-Mei (Bulldogs); Lai Meng-Ting (Eagles); Lee Yu-Ting (Wasps) |
| 2018 | Lee Szu-Shih (Eagles) | Veronika Pecková (Warriors) | Lin Chih-Ying (Eagles) | Chen Chia-Yi (Warriors) | Pan Chu-Yu (Wasps) | Hua Yi-Chin (Bulldogs) | Yang Yi-Ting (Eagles) | Chiang Ting-En (Warriors); Huang Pei-Chen (Jaguars); Yen Yi (Warriors) |
| 2019 | Lu Hsueh-Mei (Wasps) | Sierra Hyland (Lions) | Lin Chih-Ying (Eagles) | Shih Chieh-Pei (Lions) | Ke Chia-Hui (Eagles) | Lin Chia-Yu (Warriors) | Su Yi-Hsuan (Warriors) | Chen Hsiao-Mei (Bulldogs); Hung Yen-Tsu (Lions); Shen Chia-Wen (Wasps) |
| 2020 | Lin Chih-Ying (Eagles) | Kaisey Carson (Wasps) | Lee Szu-Shih (Eagles) | Chen Chia-Yi (Warriors) | Ke Chia-Hui (Eagles) | Ho Yi-Fan (Eagles) | Lin Feng-Chen (Wasps) | Chen Yu-Ting (Lions); Chiang Ting-En (Warriors); Shen Chia-Wen (Wasps) |
| 2021 | Chiang Hui-Chuan (Eagles) | Weng Tzu-Ching (Warriors) | Chen Shih-Ting (Wasps) | Lin Chih-Ying (Eagles) | Yang Yi-Ting (Eagles) | Ho Yi-Fan (Eagles) | Su Yi-Hsuan (Warriors) | Chang Chia-Yun (Eagles); Chen Chia-Yi (Warriors); Shen Chia-Wen (Wasps) |
| 2022 | Pan Chu-Yu (Wasps) | Tsai Chia-Chen (Wasps) | Lee Szu-Shih (Eagles) | Lin Chih-Ying (Eagles) | Lin Feng-Chen (Wasps) | Teng Yu-Chen (Eagles) | Liu Hsuan (Warriors) | Chen Yu-Ting (Pangolins); Chiang Ting-En (Warriors); Shen Chia-Wen (Wasps) |
| 2023 | Pan Chu-Yu (Wasps) | Alyson Spinas-Valainis (Wasps) | Chen Shih-Ting (Wasps) | Lin Chih-Ying (Eagles) | Yang Yi-Ting (Eagles) | Ke Chia-Hui (Eagles) | Su Yi-Hsuan (Wasps) | Chiang Ting-En (Warriors); Lin Pei-Yun (Bravo Bears); Shen Chia-Wen (Wasps) |
| 2024 | Lee Szu-Shih (Eagles) | Dawn Bodrug (Warriors) | Liao Pao-Hsiu (Pangolins) | Chen Chia-Yi (Warriors) | Shih Chia-Ching (Pangolins) | Ho Yi-Fan (Pangolins) | Liu Hsuan (Warriors) | Chiang Ting-En (Warriors); Wu Yu-Hsin (Eagles); Yeh Kuei-Ping (Eagles) |
| 2025 | Lin Chi-Yun (Eagles) | Ko Hsia-Ai (Eagles) | Lee Szu-Shih (Eagles) | Chen Chia-Yi (Warriors) | Lin Feng-Chen (Wasps) | Shih Chieh-Pei (Wasps) | Su Yi-Hsuan (Wasps) | Chiang Ting-En (Warriors); Shen Chia-Wen (Warriors); Yeh Kuei-Ping (Eagles) |

=== Gold glove/nice play award ===
| season | IF | OF |
|---|---|---|
| 2020 | Pan Chu-Yu (Wasps) | Chen Yun-Ting (Warriors) |
| 2021 | Yang An-Chi (Warriors) | Lin Pei-Yun (TFMI) |
| 2022 | Lan Hui-Hsien (Pangolins) | Lin Pei-Yun (Bravo Bears) |
| 2023 | Su Yi-Hsuan (Wasps) | Su Yu-Wen (Pangolins) |
| 2024 | Su Yi-Hsuan (Wasps) | Chiang Ting-En (Warriors) |
| 2025 | Chung Yi-Yun (Bravo Bears) | Shen Hsiao-Lin (Wasps) |

=== Finals MVP ===
| season | winner | team |
|---|---|---|
| 2017 | Hikari Kondo | Fu-Tian-Fu Chia-Nan Eagles |
| 2018 | Veronika Pecková | Caesar Warriors |
| 2019 | Wu Chia-Yen | New Century Wasps |
| 2020 | Chiu An-Ju | Fu-Tian-Fu Chia-Nan Eagles |
| 2021 | Ho Yi-Fan | Fu-Tian-Fu Chia-Nan Eagles |
| 2022 | Ko Hsia-Ai | Fu-Tian-Fu Chia-Nan Eagles |
| 2023 | Alyson Spinas-Valainis | New Century Wasps |
| 2024 | Pan Yu-Ling | Campus Pangolins |
| 2025 | Yeh Kuei-Ping | Fu-Tian-Fu Chia-Nan Eagles |
