= List of Softball Academic All-America Team Members of the Year =

Student athlete award

Softball Academic All-America Team Members of the Year
- Awarded for: The yearly outstanding college softball Academic All-America team member
- Country: United States & Canada
- Presented by: College Sports Communicators

History
- First award: 1988
- Most recent: NiJaree Canady, Texas Tech University, Rylee Lemos, University of Central Oklahoma, Emma Adams, Virginia Wesleyan University, Analise Rayburn, Oklahoma City University

The Softball Academic All-America Team Member of the Year is the annual most outstanding singular college softball athlete of the set of softball athletes selected for the Academic All-America Teams in a given year. The following is a list of the annual selection by College Sports Communicators (CSC), known before the 2022–23 season as the College Sports Information Directors of America (CoSIDA), and its Academic All-America sponsor of the individual athlete selected as the most outstanding of the annual Softball Academic All-America selections. Between 1988 and 2011, one winner each was chosen from both the College and University Divisions. The Academic All-America program recognizes combined athletic and academic excellence of the nation's top student-athletes. The University Division team included eligible participants from National Collegiate Athletic Association (NCAA) Division I member schools, while the College Division team included scholar-athletes from all of the following: NCAA Division II, NCAA Division III and National Association of Intercollegiate Athletics (NAIA).

Beginning in 2012, CSC revamped its award structure. The University Division was renamed "Division I". Since then, NCAA Divisions II and III have had their own separate All-Americans. The College Division consisted only of non-NCAA institutions through the 2017–18 school year, after which it was effectively replaced by an NAIA division restricted to members of that governing body.

== Winners ==
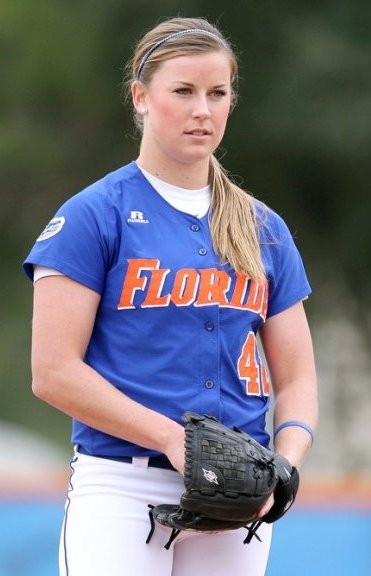
Stacey Nelson (pictured in 2009), 2009 winner

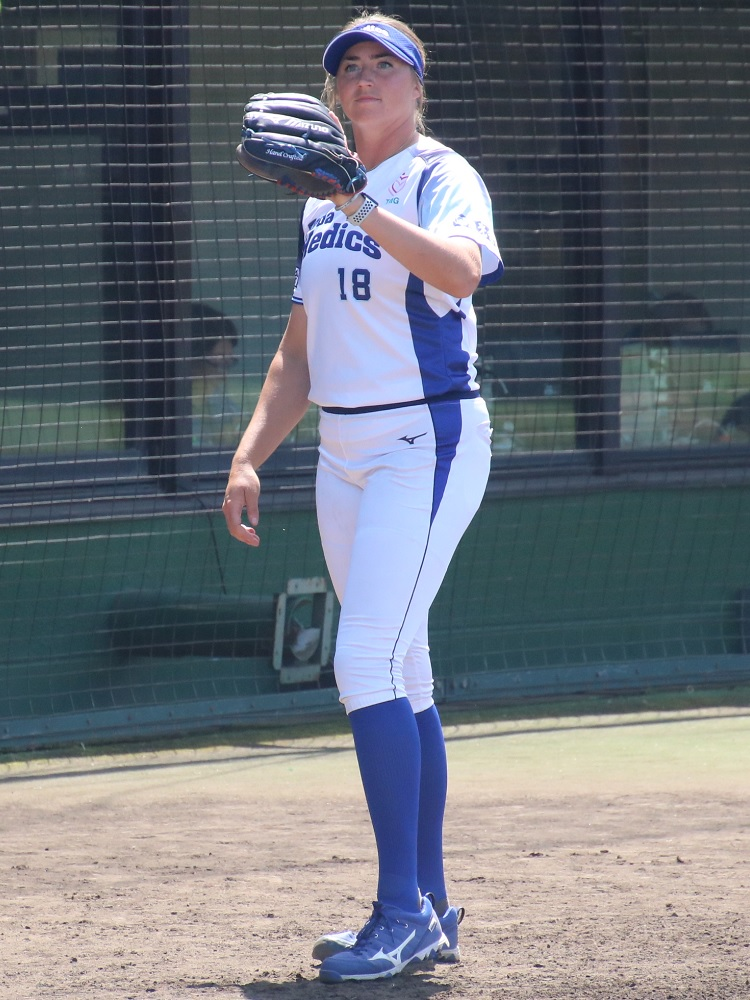
Georgina Corrick (pictured in 2024), 2022 winner

Key
†	Indicates winners of the all-sports Academic All-America award.

All winners are American unless indicated otherwise.

=== Two-division era (1988–2011) ===
Softball Academic All-America Team Members of the Year (1988–2011)
Year	University Division		College Division		Ref
Year	Winner	School	Winner	School	Ref
1988	Lori Sippel	Nebraska	Marinka Bisceglia	St. Thomas	
1989	Lisa Harvey	Oklahoma State	Denise Fogle	Millikin	
1990	Stefni Whitton	Southwestern Louisiana	Denise Fogle	Millikin	
1991	Cheryl Venorsky	Southern Illinois	Cynthia Capp	West Virginia	
1992	Shana Ruth O'Dell	Kent State	Jacqueline Dahle	St. Benedict	
1993	Stephani Williams	Kansas	Kristy Holdbrooks	North Alabama	
1994	Sara Graziano	Coastal Carolina	JoAnn Heckethorn	Trenton State	
1995	Jennifer Brundage	UCLA	Michelle Carlson	Trenton State	
1996	Christine Knotts	Southern Illinois	Karen Werkhoven	Hamilton	
1997	Leah O'Brien	Arizona	Amber Peterson	Missouri Southern	
1998	Nancy Evans	Arizona	Kelly Schade	Simpson	
1999	Isonette Polonius	East Carolina	Kelly Schade	Simpson	
2000	Lana Moran	Oklahoma	Jennifer Segner	Muskingum	
2001	Sara Carlson	Villanova	Jill Hocking	St. Mary's (MN)	
2002	Jarrah Myers	Notre Dame	Meagan Webber	Oregon Tech	
2003	Brandi Cross	Massachusetts	Jenny Esker	Southern Illinois-Edwardsville	
2004	Kate Jaspers	Mississippi State	Jenny Esker	Southern Illinois-Edwardsville	
2005	Megan Meyer	Seton Hall	Liz Swary	Washington (MO)	
2006	Lindsay Schutzler	Tennessee	Cari Kinzenbaw	Wartburg	
2007	Lindsay Schutzler	Tennessee	Laura Kot	Mount Vernon Nazarene	
2008	Angela Tincher	Virginia Tech	Maria Bye	St. Thomas (MN)	
2009	Stacey Nelson	Florida	Alison Wright	St. Thomas (MN)	
2010	Chelsea Bramlett	Mississippi State	Alison Wright	St. Thomas (MN)	
2011	Ashley Brignac	Louisiana	Kelsey Kittleson	Luther	

=== Four-division era (2012–present) ===
Softball Academic All-America Team Members of the Year (2012–present)
Year	Division I		Division II		Division III		College/NAIA (Note: College Division, 2011–19; NAIA, 2018–present)		Ref
Year	Winner	School	Winner	School	Winner	School	Winner	School	Ref
2012	Ashley Brignac	Louisiana	Kendra Huettl	Minnesota State	Kelsey Kittleson	Luther	Katie Carson	Concordia	
2013	Raven Chavanne	Tennessee	Amy Madden	Southern Nazarene	Mackenzie Griffin	John Carroll	Emma Napier	Campbellsville	
2014	Ellen Renfroe	Tennessee	Bailey Vrazel	Texas Woman's	Megan Light	Emory	Megan Nonnemacher	Saint Xavier	
2015	Haylie McCleney	Alabama	Sydnee Weaver	Young Harris	Sam Curran	Wentworth Institute	Callie Beaver	Park	
2016	Haylie McCleney	Alabama	Carley Tysinger	Catawba	Courtney Allen	Messiah	Taylor Clinkenbeard	Mobile	
2017	Kasey Cooper	Auburn	Maddie Dow	Southern Arkansas	Amanda Lochte	Texas Lutheran	Taylor Weeks	Reinhardt	
2018	Kelly Barnhill	Florida	Mariah Jameyson	Texas A&M–Commerce	Makenzie Duncan	Saint Mary's (Indiana)	Olivia Brees	Baker	
2019	Bailey Hemphill	Alabama	Christa Reisinger	Truman State	Shannon Lloyd	Keystone	Olivia Brees	Baker	
2020	Kendyl Lindaman	Florida	Kylee Smith	North Georgia	Hanna Hull	Virginia Wesleyan	Paige Alt	Coastal Georgia	
2021	Bailey Hemphill	Alabama	Kendall Cornick	Augustana	Hanna Hull	Virginia Wesleyan	Lauren Quirke	Southern Oregon	
2022	Georgina Corrick	South Florida	Amanda Weyh	Lindenwood	Kelly Jurden	Texas Lutheran	Mikaeli Davidson	Embry-Riddle (AZ)	
2023	Ashley Rogers	Tennessee	Lindsey Hibbs	Adelphi	Karson Saunders	Union (NY)	Sydney Pelaez	Georgia Gwinnett	
2024	Alyssa Brito	Oklahoma	Shelby Robb	MSU Denver	Kaili Saathoff	Linfield	Kaila Mick	Oregon Tech	
2025	NiJaree Canady	Texas Tech	Ally Distler	Colorado Mesa	Jen Kuhn	Illinois Wesleyan	Annalise Jarvis	Georgia Gwinnett	
2026	NiJaree Canady	Texas Tech	Rylee Lemos	Central Oklahoma	Emma Adams	Virginia Wesleyan	Analise Rayburn	Oklahoma City	
