= 2018 NPF Draft =

2018 NPF College Draft

General information
- Sport: Softball
- Date: April 23, 2018
- Time: 7:00 pm CST
- Location: Nashville, Tennessee
- Network: NPFTV

Overview
- 23 total selections
- League: National Pro Fastpitch
- Teams: 5
- First selection: Paige Lowary P Oklahoma selected by Chicago Bandits
- Most selections: Cleveland Comets (7)
- Fewest selections: Aussie Spirit (2)

The 2018 NPF College Draft was the 15th annual collegiate draft for the National Pro Fastpitch. It took place April 23, 2018 in Nashville, Tennessee at Acme Feed & Seed, a downtown entertainment venue. It was available for internet viewing via NPFTV, the league's streaming platform. The first selection was Paige Lowary of Oklahoma, picked by the Chicago Bandits.

== The Draft ==
Drafting an athlete gives an NPF affiliate team the rights to that athlete for two full seasons.

=== Draft Selections ===
Position key:
C = catcher; INF = infielder; SS = shortstop; OF = outfielder; UT = Utility infielder; P = pitcher; RHP = right-handed pitcher; LHP = left-handed pitcher
Positions will be listed as combined for those who can play multiple positions.

^{+}	Denotes player who has been selected to at least one All-NPF team
^{#}	Denotes player who has not played in the NPF

==== Round 1 ====
Pick	Player	Pos.	NPF Team	College
1	Paige Lowary	Pitcher	Chicago Bandits	Oklahoma
2	Allie Walljasper	Pitcher	Beijing Shougang Eagles	LSU
3	Gwen Svekis^{+}	Catcher	Chicago Bandits	Oregon
4	Randi Rupp	Pitcher	Cleveland Comets	Texas State
5	Kylee Hanson^{#}	Pitcher	Cleveland Comets	Florida State
6	Paige Parker	Pitcher	USSSA Pride	Oklahoma

==== Round 2 ====
Pick	Player	Pos.	NPF Team	College
7	Jessie Warren^{+}	Third Base	USSSA Pride	Florida State
8	Emily Watson	Pitcher	Beijing Shougang Eagles	Tulsa
9	Carley Hoover^{#}	Pitcher	Cleveland Comets	LSU
10	Aleshia Ocasio^{+}	Utility/Pitcher	Chicago Bandits	Florida
11	Vanessa Shippy^{#}	Utility	Cleveland Comets	Oklahoma State
12	Nicole Pendley	Outfield	USSSA Pride	Oklahoma

==== Round 3 ====
Pick	Player	Pos.	NPF Team	College
13	Kaylee Carlson^{#}	Pitcher	Aussie Spirit	Auburn
14	Brittany Gray^{#}	Pitcher	Beijing Shougang Eagles	Georgia
15	Jessie Scroggins^{+}	Outfield	Chicago Bandits	Baylor
16	Alexis Osorio^{#}	Pitcher	Cleveland Comets	Alabama
17	Nicole DeWitt	Utility	USSSA Pride	Florida

==== Round 4 ====
Pick	Player	Pos.	NPF Team	College
18	Kaitlin Lee^{#}	Pitcher	Aussie Spirit	Ole Miss
19	Victoria Draper^{+}	Outfield	Beijing Shougang Eagles	Auburn
20	Devin Brown	Pitcher	Cleveland Comets	South Alabama
21	DJ Sanders	Infield	Chicago Bandits	Oregon
22	Jenna Lilley	Infield	Cleveland Comets	Oregon
23	Cortni Emanuel^{#}	Outfield	USSSA Pride	Georgia

==== Draft notes ====
Round 1:

Round 2:

Round 3:

Round 4:

Round 5:

Round 6:
