= Big 12 Conference Softball Pitcher of the Year =

Big 12 Conference Pitcher of the Year
- Awarded for: the most outstanding college softball pitcher in the Big 12 Conference
- Country: United States

History
- First award: 2002-present
- Most recent: NiJaree Canady, Texas Tech; Ruby Meylan, Oklahoma State

The Big 12 Conference Softball Pitcher of the Year is a college softball award given to the Big 12 Conference's most outstanding pitcher. The award was first given following the 2002 season. Cat Osterman and Paige Parker have won the award a record four times each.

== Key ==
| * | Awarded one of the following College National Player of the Year awards: USA Softball Collegiate Player of the Year; Softball America Pitcher of the Year |

== Winners ==
| Season | Player | School | Reference |
|---|---|---|---|
| 2002 | Cat Osterman | Texas | |
| 2003 | Cat Osterman (2) | Texas | |
| 2004 | Jessica Kapchinski | Texas A&M | |
| 2005 | Cat Osterman (3) | Texas | |
| 2006 | Cat Osterman (4) | Texas | |
| 2007 | Lauren Eckermann; Amanda Scarborough | Oklahoma; Texas A&M | |
| 2008 | Megan Gibson | Texas A&M | |
| 2009 | Whitney Canion | Baylor | |
| 2010 | Blaire Luna | Texas | |
| 2011 | Chelsea Thomas | Missouri | |
| 2012 | Chelsea Thomas (2) | Missouri | |
| 2013 | Keilani Ricketts | Oklahoma | |
| 2014 | Whitney Canion (2) | Baylor | |
| 2015 | Paige Parker | Oklahoma | |
| 2016 | Paige Parker (2) | Oklahoma | |
| 2017 | Paige Parker (3) | Oklahoma | |
| 2018 | Paige Parker (4) | Oklahoma | |
| 2019 | Giselle Juarez | Oklahoma | |
| 2021 | Carrie Eberle | Oklahoma State | |
| 2022 | Jordy Bahl; Kelly Maxwell | Oklahoma; Oklahoma State | |
| 2023 | Jordy Bahl (2) | Oklahoma | |
| 2024 | Lexi Kilfoyl | Oklahoma State | |
| 2025 | NiJaree Canady | Texas Tech | |
| 2026 | NiJaree Canady (2); Ruby Meylan | Texas Tech; Oklahoma State | |

== Winners by school ==
| School | Winners | Years |
|---|---|---|
| Oklahoma | 9 | 2007, 2013, 2015, 2016, 2017, 2018, 2019, 2022, 2023 |
| Texas | 5 | 2002, 2003, 2005, 2006, 2010 |
| Oklahoma State | 4 | 2021, 2022, 2024, 2026 |
| Texas A&M | 3 | 2004, 2007, 2008 |
| Baylor | 2 | 2009, 2014 |
| Missouri | 2 | 2011, 2012 |
| Texas Tech | 2 | 2025, 2026 |
| Arizona | 0 | — |
| Arizona State | 0 | — |
| BYU | 0 | — |
| Houston | 0 | — |
| Iowa State | 0 | — |
| Kansas | 0 | — |
| UCF | 0 | — |
| Utah | 0 | — |
