= Zongguanjia Leopard Cat =

Professional women's softball team

Information
- League: Taiwan Professional Women's Softball League
- Location: Taichung
- Founded: 2016
- League championships: 1 (2024)
- 2026: 7-23
- did not qualify
- Former name: Wagor Jaguars(2016－2018); Xinliwang Lions(2019－2020); Taichung Tigers(2021); Campus Pangolins(2022－2025)
- Manager: Tung Yun-chi

The Zongguanjia Leopard Cat is a women's softball team. They were founded in 2016 as part of Taiwan Professional Women's Softball League. The team is essentially the National Taiwan University of Sport Women's Softball Team with partial Dongshan Senior High School Softball Team players.

== History ==
The team was originally sponsored by Wagor Education System and named Wagor Jaguars. In 2019, the team was renamed Xinliwang Lions after Xinliwang International Holdings Company took over the sponsorship. In 2021, the team was sponsored by Guo Tai Spirits Company and renamed Taichung Tigers. In 2022, the team was renamed Campus Pangolins after receiving sponsorship by Chao Chi Property Management Consulting Company. In 2026, the team was renamed Zongguanjia Leopard Cat.

== Season-by-season ==
Season records
Season	W	L	Finish	Playoff results
2016	9	15	3rd place	Did not qualify
2017	6	18	5th place	Did not qualify
2018	4	20	5th place	Did not qualify
2019	18	11	2nd place	Lost to New Century Wasps 4-games-to-0 in finals, defeated TFMI Bulldogs 3-games-to-1 in playoffs
2020	18	14	3rd place	Lost to New Century Wasps 3-games-to-2 in playoffs
2021	7	17	4th place	Did not qualify
2022	10	22	4th place	Did not qualify
2023	6	26	5th place	Did not qualify
2024	22	8	1st place	Defeated New Taipei Cesar Warriors 4-games-to-3 in finals
2025	20	10	2nd place	Lost to New Century Wasps 3-games-to-1 in playoffs
2026	7	23	6th place	Did not qualify
Totals	127	184		

== Roster ==
Zongguanjia Leopard Cat roster
Active roster		Coaches
Pitchers: 1 (Taiwan) Pan Yu-ling; 2 (Taiwan) Yu Yi-hsuan; 11 (Taiwan) Chuang Ching-yi; 13 (Canada) Kara Bilodeau; 14 (Taiwan) Kao Yung-hsin; 21 (Taiwan) Yang Yi-shan	Catchers: 16 (Taiwan) Wu Yeh-lin; 19 (Taiwan) Liao Bao-hsiu; Infielders: 5 (Taiwan) Chen An-hsin; 6 (Taiwan) Shih Chia-ching; 7 (Taiwan) Ko Chia-hui; 8 (Taiwan) Hsiao Pei-chieh; 17 (Taiwan) Hsu Hsin-ling; 20 (Taiwan) Tsai Pao-pei; 23 (Taiwan) Kao Pei-chun; Outfielders: 15 (Taiwan) Lin Chieh-yu; 18 (Taiwan) Su Yu-wen; 22 (Taiwan) Luo Yu-ching; 25 (Taiwan) Lin Yu-ting; 26 (Taiwan) Feng Tsai-ying	Manager: (Taiwan) Tung Yun-chi; Coaches: 20 (Taiwan) Tsai Pao-pei; 21 (Taiwan) Yang Yi-shan; Roster updated April 20, 2026

=== Notable players ===
- Kelly Barnhill (2020)
- Sierra Hyland (2019–20)
- Tori Vidales (2020)
