= NFCA Golden Shoe Award =

College softball award

- Awarded for: Best base stealer in college softball
- Country: United States
- Presented by: New Balance

History
- First award: 2005
- Most recent: Chelsea Mack, Louisville

The NFCA Golden Shoe Award is an award given by New Balance to the best college softball base stealer from an NFCA member institution. A committee of elected head coaches selects the winner of the award.

== Winners ==
Year	Player	School	Ref
2005	Sharonda McDonald	Texas A&M	
2006	Caitlin Lowe	Arizona	
2007	Caitlin Lowe	Arizona	
2008	Rhea Taylor	Missouri	
2009	Chelsea Bramlett	Mississippi State	
2010	Emily Allard	Mississippi State	
2011	Wendi Reed	Northwestern	
2012	Chelsea Bramlett	Jackson State	
2013	Raven Chavanne	Tennessee	
2014	Taylor Gadbois	Missouri	
2015	Morgan Zerkle	Marshall	
2016	Katie Lacour	Southeastern Louisiana	
2017	Elicia D'Orazio	Marshall	
2018	Cortni Emanuel	Georgia	
2019	Jaquelyn Ramon	Southeastern Louisiana	
2020	Not awarded due to the COVID-19 pandemic		
2021	Jenna Wildeman	Central Arkansas	
2022	Alexis Johns	South Florida	
2023	Mihyia Davis	Louisiana	
2024	Megan Delgadillo	Cal State Fullerton	
2025	Kai Luschar	Oregon	
2026	Chelsea Mack	Louisville	
