= Megan Gibson-Loftin =

American softball player and coach

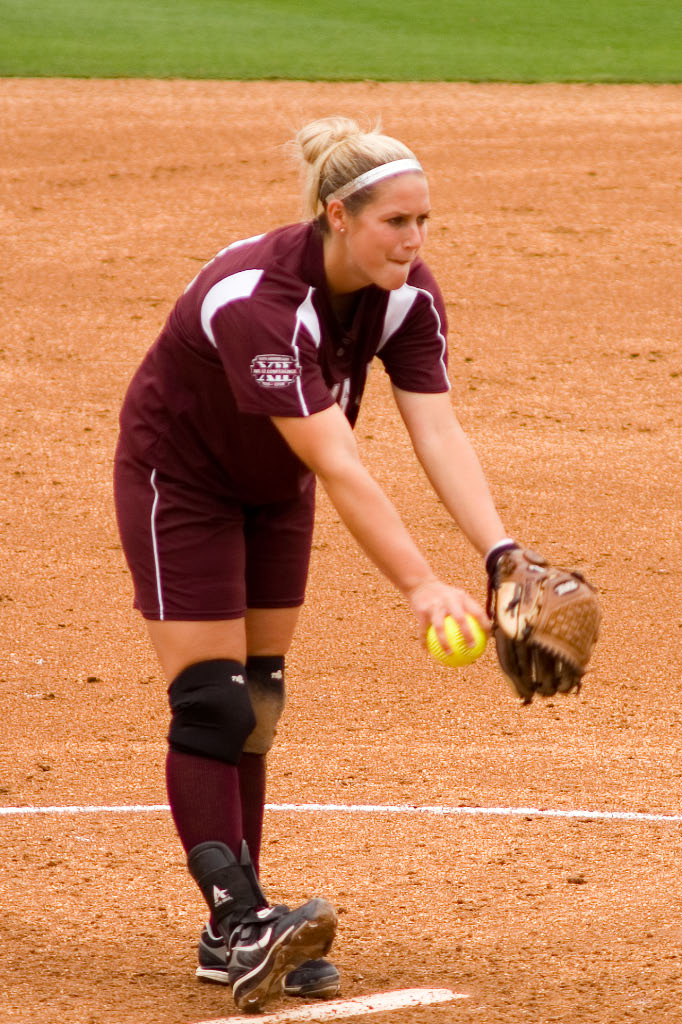
- Megan Gibson-Loftin (then Megan Gibson) in 2007

Current position
- Title: Pitching coach
- Team: Houston
- Conference: The American

Biographical details
- Born: March 25, 1986 (age 40); Spring, Texas, U.S.

Playing career
- 2005–2008: Texas A&M
- 2008–2009: Philadelphia Force
- 2009: Denso
- 2010–2011: Tennessee/NPF Diamonds

Coaching career (HC unless noted)
- 2011: Texas A&M (volunteer asst.)
- 2012–2013: UTSA (pitching)
- 2014–2016: Penn State (pitching)
- 2017–present: Houston (pitching)

Accomplishments and honors

Awards
- Women's College World Series All-Tournament (2008); 2× first-team NFCA All-American (2007, 2008); Second-team NFCA All-American (2005); Big 12 Player of the Year (2008); Big 12 Pitcher of the Year (2008); First-team All-Big 12 (2005); Second-team All-Big 12 (2006); Big-12 Tournament Most Outstanding Player (2008); 3× Big-12 All-Tournament (2005, 2006, 2008)

Megan Lynn Gibson-Loftin (born March 25, 1986) is an American former collegiate All-American, professional softball pitcher and current director of softball operations for Twelve Softball. She is also the former pitching coach at Houston. Gibson-Loftin played college softball for Texas A&M where she is the career leader in offense walks and led them to a runner-up finish at the 2008 Women's College World Series. She also ranks top-10 in the latter category and home runs in the Big 12 Conference. She was selected by the Philadelphia Force as the second overall pick in the 2008 NPF Draft, eventually playing for four seasons. After the Force folded she was picked up by the Tennessee Diamonds in 2010.

== Career ==
=== College ===
Born Megan Lynn Gibson in Spring, Texas, Gibson-Loftin played college softball at Texas A&M from 2004 to 2008. In the 2008 season, she was collegiate national player of the week from February 25 to March 2. She led her team to win the program's second Big 12 regular season and first tournament championship. In the postseason, she led her team to the Final Series of the 2008 Women's College World Series. Gibson ended her senior season as runner-up for USA Softball Collegiate Player of the Year honors, as a first-team NFCA All-American, and the first player to win both Player of the Year and Pitcher of the Year honors from the Big 12.

She graduated from Texas A&M in 2008 with a bachelor's degree in sport management with a minor in business.

=== Professional career ===
Gibson-Loftin played professional softball for National Pro Fastpitch from 2008 to 2011. The second overall pick in the 2008 NPF draft selected by the Philadelphia Force, Gibson-Loftin played for the Force from 2008 to 2009 and for the Tennessee (later NPF) Diamonds from 2010 to 2011. In 2009, Gibson-Loftin played for Denso of Women's Major League Softball in Japan.

== Coaching career ==
Along with her career in the NPF, Gibson served under Texas A&M head coach Jo Evans as a graduate assistant in Fall 2008 and again as a volunteer pitching coach during the 2011 season. She also spent time as a softball instructor at High Performance Baseball in Tomball and as a volunteer assistant coach at Spring High School in 2010.

Gibson joined the Penn State coaching staff after spending two seasons as an assistant under Coach Lehotak at University of Texas at San Antonio.

== Personal life ==
Gibson-Loftin married Lance Loftin, a former professional baseball player who played college baseball at Texas State, in 2015. He also got drafted and played baseball for the Toronto Blue Jays.

== Career statistics ==
Texas A&M Aggies
YEAR	W	L	GP	GS	CG	SHO	SV	IP	H	R	ER	BB	SO	ERA	WHIP
2005	13	6	23	18	12	1	1	112.2	107	62	57	43	76	3.55	1.33
2006	17	4	24	22	14	3	1	140.0	131	61	51	33	102	2.55	1.17
2007	17	4	29	25	14	8	0	155.0	131	44	34	34	157	1.53	1.06
2008	41	4	46	45	42	21	0	303.2	188	61	52	68	344	1.20	0.84
TOTALS	88	18	122	110	82	33	1	711.1	557	228	194	178	679	1.91	1.03

Texas A&M Aggies
YEAR	G	AB	R	H	BA	RBI	HR	3B	2B	TB	SLG	BB	SO	SB	SBA
2005	55	158	51	64	.405	57	18	0	12	130	.823%	28	23	7	7
2006	53	135	33	42	.311	37	12	0	10	88	.652%	38	24	7	7
2007	60	147	50	57	.387	41	13	2	9	109	.741%	51	26	5	6
2008	67	183	44	62	.339	48	13	1	17	120	.656%	55	26	12	12
TOTALS	235	623	178	225	.361	183	56	3	48	447	.717%	172	99	31	32
