= Jessica Burroughs =

American softball player (born 1993)

USSSA Pride – No. 16
- Pitcher
- Born: November 2, 1993 (age 32); Warner Robins, Georgia, U.S.
- Bats: Right Throws: Right

NPF debut
- 2017, for the USSSA Pride

Teams
- Florida St. Seminoles (2014–2017); USSSA Pride (2017–present)

Career highlights and awards
- All-NPF Team (2018)

Jessica Burroughs (born November 2, 1993) is an American former collegiate All-American professional softball pitcher. She played college softball at Florida State, being named a four-time all-conference and back-to-back Pitcher of the Year in her last two seasons. She would help the Seminoles to a semifinal finish at the 2016 Women's College World Series. Burroughs was selected first overall by the USSSA Pride in the 2017 NPF Draft. She went on to play for and win consecutive titles with the Pride in 2018 and 2019. She later played in the inaugural season of the Athletes Unlimited Softball league in 2020.

== Early life ==
Burroughs was born to parents Alesia Taylor and Joe Burroughs on November 2, 1993, in Warner Robins, Georgia. Burroughs attended Houston County High School where she lettered in softball four times. She graduated in 2012.

== College career ==
Burroughs signed to play college softball at Florida State Seminoles, although she redshirted in 2013. In 2014 and 2015, Burroughs was an effective backup to Lacey Waldrop, earning All-ACC second team honors in both seasons. Burroughs was named the ACC Pitcher of the Year in 2016, as well as a Third Team All-American. She was named ACC Pitcher of the Year again in 2017 and a First Team All-American.

== Professional career ==
Burroughs was drafted as the first overall pick in the 2017 NPF Draft by the USSSA Florida Pride, becoming the first player ever out of the ACC to be drafted at number one.

== Career statistics ==
FSU Seminoles
YEAR	W	L	GP	GS	CG	SHO	SV	IP	H	R	ER	BB	SO	ERA	WHIP
2014	17	1	28	21	6	3	1	114.2	83	40	34	45	125	2.08	1.12
2015	19	6	39	28	15	8	3	185.0	115	70	55	69	219	2.08	0.99
2016	29	5	41	32	14	6	1	203.0	122	64	54	60	235	1.86	0.89
2017	27	5	44	34	11	7	4	195.0	109	42	34	31	266	1.22	0.72
TOTALS	92	17	152	115	46	24	9	697.2	429	216	177	205	845	1.77	0.91
