= SEC Pitcher of the Year =

Southeastern Conference Player of the Year refers to the most outstanding player for the Southeastern Conference (SEC) in baseball or softball for a given season.

- Southeastern Conference Baseball Pitcher of the Year
- Southeastern Conference Softball Pitcher of the Year
