= Acme Farm Supply Building =

- U.S. National Register of Historic Places
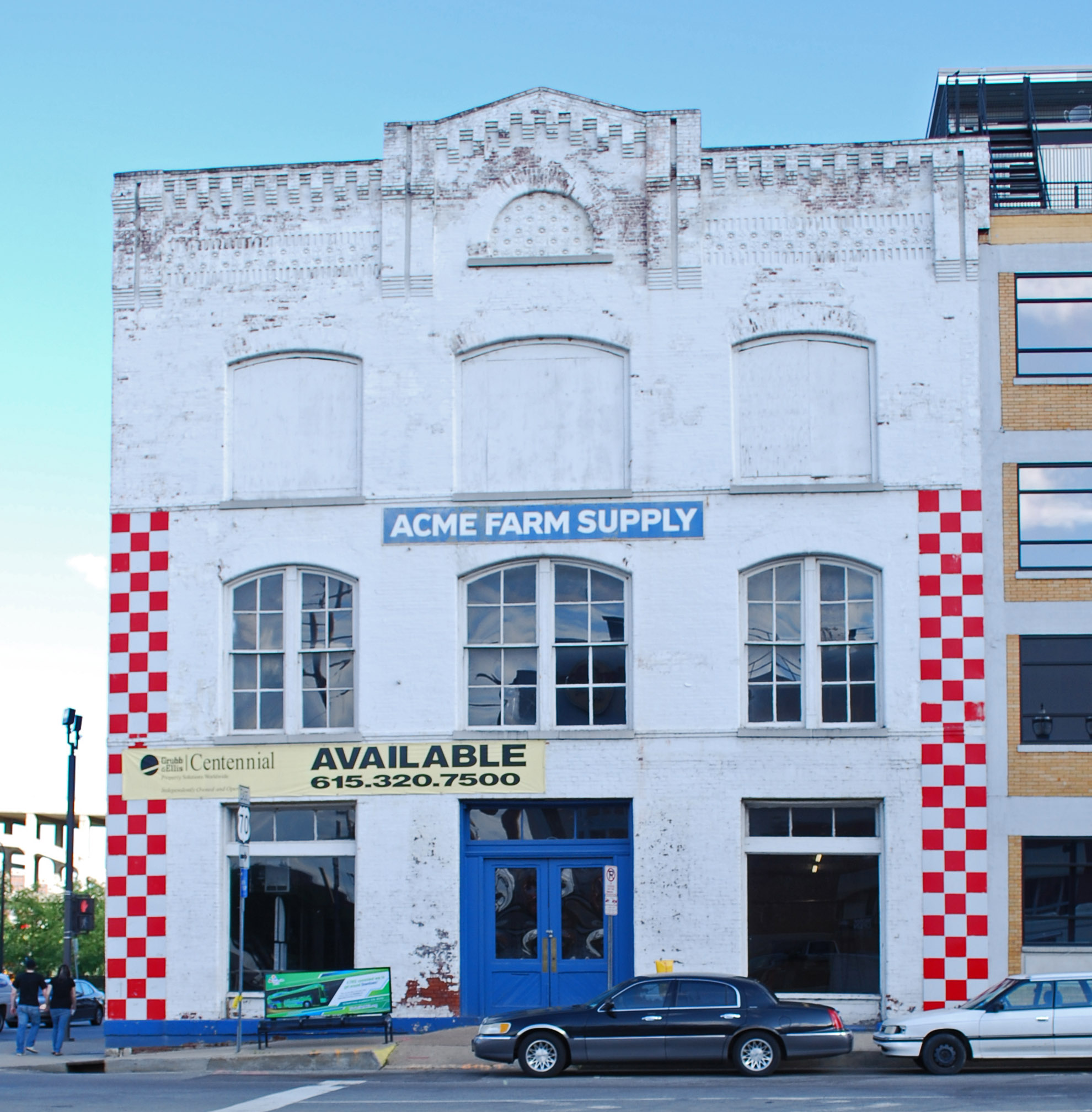
- The Building in May 2010

- Location within Tennessee Location within the United States
- Location: 101 Broadway, Nashville, Tennessee
- Coordinates: 36°09′43″N 86°46′28″W
- Built: 1890
- Built by: J.R. Whitemore
- NRHP reference No.: 98000320

The Acme Farm Supply Building is a listed building in Nashville, Davidson County, Tennessee, US. Originally a grocery store, it has been a restaurant and music venue since 2014.

== Location ==
The Acme Farm Supply Building is located on the corner of First Avenue and Broadway in Downtown Nashville, off the Cumberland River.

== History ==
It was built in 1890 by J.R. Whitemore as a three-story building. The first tenants were two brothers, Frederic and William Cummins, who rented the building for their grocery store in 1890. It later housed Southern Soda Works, Continental Baking Powder Co., Ford Flour Co., and D. Byrd and Co. In 1913, it housed the Bearden Buggy Co., and a wooden elevator was added to the building to move buggies up and down. It later housed Sherman Transfer Co., Chadwell Transfer and Storage Co., and the Tennessee Wholesale Drug Co.

In 1943, it became the home for Acme Feed and Hatchery, known as Acme Farm Supply in 1965. The farm supply store, which sold "straw, feed, wire, tools" and more products needed on a farm, was owned by Currey L. Turner, a businessman from Nashville. His pet calf, Beautena, appeared during commercials at the Grand Ole Opry. In 1980, his son, Lester Turner Sr., bought the building. The store closed down in September 1999. The building, however, is still owned by the Turner family trust. It was for rent in 2000, but it stayed vacant until 2013.

In 2013, Tom Morales, a restaurateur and owner of TomKats, a catering company for movie sets, as well as several other businesspeople, including country music singer Alan Jackson, leased the building from the Turner family trust through MJM Real Estate Partners LLC to turn it into a restaurant/bar and music venue. Known as Acme Feed & Seed, it opened in 2014.

== Heritage significance ==
It has been listed on the National Register of Historic Places since 1998. D. Loren McWatters, a professor of history at Middle Tennessee State University, helped research the history of the building and get it listed it on the register.
