= Paige Parker (softball) =

American softball player and coach

Current position
- Title: Director of player development
- Team: Oregon
- Conference: Big Ten

Biographical details
- Born: January 24, 1996 (age 30); Independence, Missouri, U.S.
- Education: Oklahoma (Class of 2018)

Playing career
- 2015–2018: Oklahoma Sooners
- 2018: USSSA Pride

Coaching career (HC unless noted)
- 2019: William Jewell College (asst.)
- 2020: Oklahoma (VA)
- 2020–2021: Tulsa (asst.)
- 2021–2024: Utah (asst.)
- 2024–2025: Utah (AHC)

Accomplishments and honors

Awards
- NFCA National Freshman of the Year (2015); WCWS Most Outstanding Player (2016); 4× Big 12 Pitcher of the Year (2015–2018)

Paige Nicole Parker (born January 24, 1996) is an American, former professional softball pitcher and current director of player development at Oregon. She played college softball at Oklahoma, and won back-to-back National Championships with the Sooners in 2016 and 2017. Parker is a career record holder for perfect games (4) for the school and also ranks top-10 in the Big 12 Conference and the NCAA Division I for the same category. She was drafted sixth overall in the 2018 NPF Draft and went on to play for the USSSA Pride.

== Playing career ==
She attended Truman High School in Independence, Missouri. She later attended the University of Oklahoma, where she pitched for the Oklahoma Sooners softball team. Parker led the Sooners to back-to-back Women's College World Series championships in 2016 and 2017. She was also a four-time All-American.

Parker was drafted sixth overall in the 2018 NPF Draft and went on to play for the USSSA Pride.

== Coaching career ==
On October 5, 2018, Parker was named assistant coach for the William Jewell College softball team.

On September 18, 2019, she was named volunteer assistant coach for Oklahoma, and on July 31, 2020, Parker was named assistant coach for Tulsa.

On August 13, 2021, she was named assistant coach for Utah, and later on September 11, 2024, she was promoted to associate head coach. On July 9, 2025, she was named director of player development for Oregon.

== Career statistics ==
YEAR	W	L	GP	GS	CG	SHO	SV	IP	H	R	ER	BB	SO	ERA	WHIP
2015	28	7	42	31	23	9	3	217.0	129	56	51	57	224	1.64	0.85
2016	38	3	47	36	32	14	0	252.1	174	69	59	68	269	1.64	0.96
2017	26	5	44	31	15	6	2	210.1	136	54	43	47	262	1.43	0.87
2018	31	3	41	35	10	8	1	187.2	101	24	22	38	213	0.82	0.74
TOTALS	123	18	174	133	80	37	6	867.1	540	203	175	210	968	1.41	0.86
