= Delanie Gourley =

American softball player

USSSA Pride – No. 31
- Pitcher
- Born: April 13, 1995 (age 31); Lakeside, California, U.S.
- Bats: Left Throws: Left

NPF debut
- June 27, 2017, for the Texas Charge

Career statistics
- Win–loss record: 2–1
- Earned run average: 5.69
- Strikeouts: 18
- Innings Pitched: 16.0
- Games started: 2

Teams
- Florida Gators (2014–2017); Texas Charge (2017); USSSA Pride (2018–present)

Delanie Rai Gourley (born April 13, 1995) is an American softball pitcher for the USSSA Pride of National Pro Fastpitch. A member of the United States women's national softball team, Gourley played college softball at the University of Florida.

== Early life ==
Gourley was born on April 13, 1995, in Lakeside, California, where she attended El Capitan High School. She graduated in 2013.

== College career ==
Gourley ranked 10th all time in ERA, 2nd in opponent batting average, 5th in winning percentage, 10th in wins, 3rd in saves, 10th in appearances, 8th in shutouts, and 8th in strikeouts during her time at University of Florida. She pitched a no-hitter against Florida A&M on May 19, 2017.

=== Stats ===
Year	W	L	GP	GS	CG	Sh	SV	IP	H	R	ER	BB	SO	ERA
2014	15	1	27	18	9	5	2	107.2	80	44	41	47	127	2.67
2015	10	2	26	12	5	4	5	79	53	36	24	32	105	2.13
2016	19	4	33	19	11	8	5	143.2	67	22	15	46	206	0.73

== International career ==
Gourley was named to the United States women's national softball team roster in 2016. Gourley returned to the team in 2017. Gourley helped the Red, White, and Blue to a World Cup of Softball Silver Medal in 2016. Gourley helped the team to a gold medal at the 2016 Women's Softball World Championship.

=== Stats ===
Year	W	L	GP	GS	CG	Sh	SV	IP	H	R	ER	BB	SO	ERA
2016	4	1	9	4	0	N/A	2	19.2	12	1	1	2	20	0.36

== Professional career ==
Gourley was drafted by the Scrap Yard Dawgs in the 3rd round of the 2017 NPF Draft as the 12th pick overall. She was immediately traded to the Texas Charge for the Charge's 3rd and 5th-round picks.
