= Sierra Hyland =

American softball player

Personal information
- National team: Mexico
- Born: March 3, 1995 (age 31) Shawnee, Kansas, U.S.

Sport
- Sport: Softball
- College team: Cal Poly Mustangs
- League: Women's Professional Fastpitch
- Team: Smash It Sports Vipers; Xinliwang Lions (2019–20); Ogaki Minamo (2022)

Sierra Hyland (born March 3, 1995) is a professional softball pitcher for the Smash It Sports Vipers of the Women's Professional Fastpitch (WPF). She represented Mexico at the 2020 Tokyo Olympics and helped them place fourth.

== Early life ==
Hyland was born in Merriam, Kansas and grew up in Visalia, California. She played softball at El Diamante High School.

== Playing career ==
She graduated from Cal Poly. As a Mustang, Hyland broke the all-time career Big West Conference strikeouts record (finishing with 965) and tossed three perfect games (on March 29, 2014; February 11, 2017; and May 22, 2017 in the NISC).

She also played for the Cleveland Comets after being drafted fourth overall in 2017. As a rookie with Chicago, Hyland compiled a 3.57 ERA in 15.2 innings.

At the 2021 Olympics, Hyland pitched 1.2 innings across two games, holding opposing batters to a .167 average.
