= Paige Lowary =

American softball player

Personal information
- Nationality: American
- Born: June 27, 1996 (age 30) Dallas Center, Iowa, U.S.
- Height: 5 ft 10 in (1.78 m)

Sport
- Country: USA
- Sport: Softball
- College team: Missouri Tigers; Oklahoma Sooners

Paige Lowary (born June 27, 1996) is an American former softball pitcher, originally from Dallas Center, Iowa. She attended Dallas Center-Grimes High School in Grimes, Iowa. She attended the University of Missouri in 2015 and 2016, before transferring to the University of Oklahoma. She holds the Sooner career record for saves (18) in just two seasons and for her full career ranks top-5 for the same category in all the NCAA Division I. At both universities, she was both a starting and relief pitcher for the school's respective college softball teams. During her junior season in 2017, Lowary led Oklahoma to the 2017 Women's College World Series final, where they defeated No. 1 Florida, 5–4 to claim the national championship. Lowary was chosen as the number-one pick in the National Pro Fastpitch draft and went on to play for the USSSA Pride for the 2018–2019 season.

== Injury ==
In her second season at Missouri, Lowary was pitching against the Oregon Ducks softball team. She was struck by a ball off the bat of outfielder, Nikki Udria. Udria's ball hit Lowary in the face, resulting in a serious injury. Lowary suffered emotionally afterwards and ended up transferring to Oklahoma. The coaching staff, including Patty Gasso and Melyssa Lombardi, worked with Lowary to help her regain her confidence in the circle.

== Career statistics ==
Missouri Tigers & Oklahoma Sooners
YEAR	W	L	GP	GS	CG	SHO	SV	IP	H	R	ER	BB	SO	ERA	WHIP
2015	18	7	37	26	6	0	4	162.2	152	97	79	78	164	3.41	1.42
2016	25	8	44	31	16	4	2	198.0	186	110	92	103	151	3.25	1.46
2017	16	3	43	16	4	1	11	146.2	84	40	32	33	122	1.53	0.80
2018	10	2	41	6	2	1	7	96.0	66	19	15	14	74	1.09	0.83
TOTALS	69	20	165	79	28	6	24	603.1	488	266	218	228	511	2.53	1.18
