= Morgan Zerkle =

American softball coach and player

Current position
- Title: Head coach
- Team: Marshall
- Conference: Sun Belt
- Record: 94–70 (.573)

Biographical details
- Born: August 12, 1995 (age 31); Milton, West Virginia, U.S.

Playing career
- 2014–2017: Marshall
- Position: Outfield

Coaching career (HC unless noted)
- 2018–2019: Indiana (GA)
- 2020–2023: Miami (OH) (assistant)
- 2024–present: Marshall

Head coaching record
- Overall: 94–70 (.573)

Morgan Leigh Zerkle (born August 12, 1995) is an American professional softball player and collegiate coach, who plays for the Chicago Bandits of the Athletes Unlimited Softball League (AUSL) and serving as the head coach of Marshall University Thundering Herd softball team.

== Early life and education ==
Zerkle was born in Milton, West Virginia and attended Cabell Midland High School before accepting her only collegiate scholarship offer from Marshall University. She went on to earn a degree in exercise science and later completed a master’s degree in kinesiology at the university.

== Career ==
=== College ===
Zerkle played four seasons at Marshall University, under head coach Shonda Stanton. She finishing her career as the all-time leader in batting average (.451), triples (14), and stolen bases (162).

In her senior season (2017), she hit .476 with nine home runs, 43 RBIs, 39 stolen bases, and 48 runs scored. She was named Conference USA Player of the Year and Conference USA Female Student-Athlete of the Year (all sports), and received NFCA All-America Second Team honors. She was also a finalist for the Senior CLASS Award and twice a finalist for the USA Softball Collegiate Player of the Year.

A four-time All-Conference USA selection and three-time NFCA All-Region honoree, Zerkle ranked second in the nation in batting average in both her sophomore and senior seasons. As a sophomore she won the NFCA Golden Shoe Award for the most stolen bases in the country.

=== Professional ===
Zerkle was selected 26th overall in the 2017 National Pro Fastpitch (NPF) Draft by the Scrap Yard Dawgs. She later joined the Athletes Unlimited pro league when it launched in 2020, competing with the Chicago Bandits. She became the first player in Athletes Unlimited Softball League history to reach 10,000 career leaderboard points, and the first to appear in 100 career games.

In the inaugural AUSL season (2024), Zerkle posted the first hit in league history, a first-inning double, and hit the first inside-the-park home run in league history. She finished as a top-five player in batting average and led the league in home runs with nine. She remains an active player and is protected by the Bandits for the 2026 season.

=== National Team ===
Zerkle competed in the 2016 and 2017 World Cups of Softball and the 2017 Japan Cup, earning silver medals in both 2017 events. In the 2022 Pan American Championship, she hit .562 with four RBIs and eight runs scored, helping Team USA win the gold medal. She also participated in the 2025–26 USA Down Under Series against Australia.

=== Coaching ===
After her playing career at Marshall, Zerkle moved into coaching. She served as a graduate assistant at Indiana (2018–2019) before joining the Miami RedHawks as an assistant coach (2020–2023). During her four seasons in Oxford, the RedHawks went 137–55–1, won three consecutive MAC championships, and made three NCAA Softball tournament appearances.

On June 26, 2023, Zerkle was named the fifth head coach in Marshall Thundering Herd softball history. In her second season, the Herd finished second in the Sun Belt Conference with a 15–9 league record, a five-win improvement over the prior year. In her third season she led the Herd to their third NCAA Softball tournament appearance in program history.

== Head coaching record ==
Record table
Season	Team	Overall	Conference	Standing	Postseason
Marshall Thundering Herd (Sun Belt Conference) (2024–present)
2024	Marshall	25–28	10–14	T–9th	
2025	Marshall	31–23	15–9	2nd	
2026	Marshall	38–19	17–7	2nd	NCAA Regional
Marshall:		94–70 (.573)	42–30 (.583)		
Total:		94–70 (.573)			
National champion Postseason invitational champion Conference regular season champion Conference regular season and conference tournament champion Division regular season champion Division regular season and conference tournament champion Conference tournament champion

== See also ==
- NCAA Division I softball career .400 batting average list
