= Marshall Thundering Herd softball =

Marshall Thundering Herd
- 2026 Marshall Thundering Herd softball team
- Founded: 1994
- University: Marshall University
- Head coach: Morgan Zerkle (2nd season)
- Conference: Sun Belt
- Location: Huntington, West Virginia, US
- Home stadium: Dot Hicks Field (capacity: 325)
- Nickname: Thundering Herd
- Colors: Kelly green and white

NCAA Tournament appearances
- 2013, 2017, 2026

Conference tournament championships
- 1995, 2013

Regular-season conference championships
- 2003, 2005, 2017

The Marshall Thundering Herd softball team represents Marshall University in NCAA Division I college softball. The team participates in the Sun Belt Conference. They are currently coached by head coach Morgan Zerkle. They play their home games at Dot Hicks Field. The Thundering Herd have made three NCAA Tournament appearances, most recently in 2026.

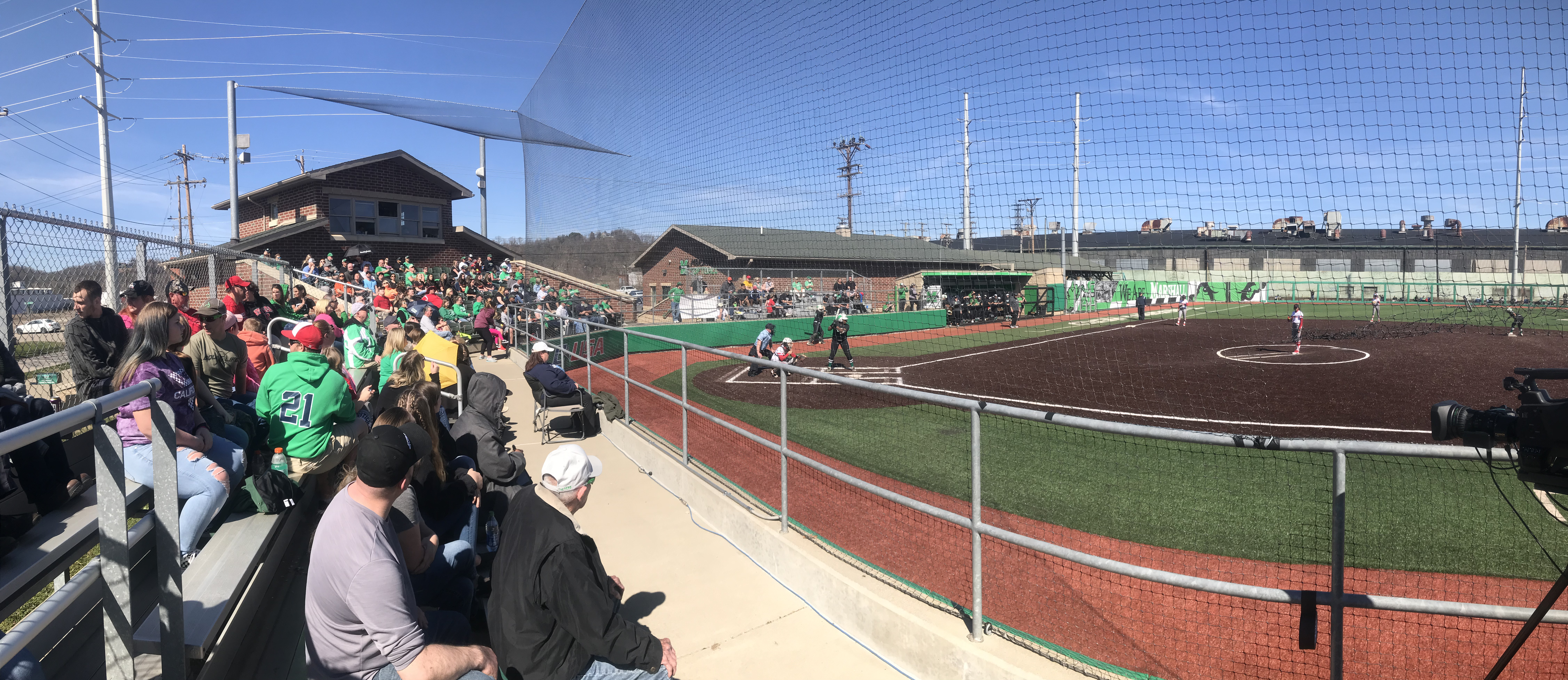
Dot Hicks Field, home of Marshall Softball.

== Venue ==
Built in 2008, Dot Hicks Field is a softball facility that features a clubhouse, grandstands, pressbox and concession building, warmup areas, and the playing field. The field is named after Dorothy "Dot" Hicks, who was a donor and former coach of Marshall's volleyball, badminton, women's tennis and women's golf teams. An inaugural double-header took place on March 15, 2008. The Thundering Herd lost to Houston in both games, 17–2 and 10–2 respectively. Marshall set a home-attendance record crowd of 2,768 at The Dot on April 18, 2023, when they hosted and lost 3–1 to #13 ranked Alabama.

== Individual awards and honors ==
	Name	Year(s)
NFCA All-American Selection	Autumn Owen (C)	2023 All-American Third Team
NFCA All-American Selection	Mya Stevenson (OF)	2022 All-American Third Team
NFCA All-American Selection	Morgan Zerkle (SS)	2017 All-American Second Team
NFCA All-American Selection	Jordan Dixon (P)	2017 All-American Third Team
NFCA All-American Selection	Rachel Folden (C)	2005 All-American Third Team; 2006 All-American Second Team; 2007 All-American Second Team; 2008 All-American Third Team
Conference Player of the Year	Sydni Burko	2026 Sun Belt
Conference Player of the Year	Morgan Zerkle	2017 C-USA
Conference Player of the Year	Rachel Folden	2008 C-USA
Conference Player of the Year	Rachel Folden	2006 C-USA
Conference Player of the Year	Sierra Davenport	2004 MAC
Conference Pitcher of the Year	Sydney Nester	2022 C-USA
Conference Pitcher of the Year	Jordan Dixon	2017 C-USA
Conference Pitcher of the Year	Randi Nielson	2003 MAC
Conference Freshman of the Year	Aly Harrell	2018 C-USA
Conference Freshman of the Year	Elicia D’Orazio	2015 C-USA
Conference Freshman of the Year	Rachel Folden	2005 MAC
Conference Freshman of the Year	Amanda Williams	2003 MAC
Conference Freshman of the Year	Dawn Matoy	1997 Southern
Conference Freshman of the Year	Stefanie Cook	1995 Southern
Conference Freshman of the Year	Brandi Northrup	1994 Southern
Conference Coach of the Year	Shonda Stanton	2017 C-USA
Conference Coach of the Year	Shonda Stanton	2005 MAC
Conference Coach of the Year	Shonda Stanton	2003 MAC
Conference Coach of the Year	Louie Berndt	1997 Southern
NFCA Golden Shoe Award	Elicia D'Orazio	2017
NFCA Golden Shoe Award	Morgan Zerkle	2015

== NCAA Regional appearances ==
NCAA Regional Results
2013 Lexington, KY Regional

Lost to Kentucky, 1–2
Defeated Notre Dame, 3–1
Lost to Virginia Tech, 2–3

2017 Lexington, KY Regional

Lost to Illinois, 2–3
Defeated DePaul, 2–1
Lost to Illinois, 2–10

2026 Durham, NC Regional

Lost to Arizona, 5-7
Defeated Howard, 4-2
Lost to Duke, 1-11

== Year-by-year results ==
Season	Conference	Coach	Overall				Conference				Notes
Season	Conference	Coach	Games	Win	Loss	Tie	Games	Win	Loss	Tie	Notes
1994	SoCon	Louie Berndt	38	17	21	0	6	1	5	0	
1995	SoCon	Louie Berndt	57	28	29	0	12	4	8	0	SoCon tournament champions
1996	SoCon	Louie Berndt	62	38	24	0	15	4	11	0	
1997	SoCon	Louie Berndt	61	36	25	0	15	8	7	0	
1998	MAC	Louie Berndt	55	16	39	0	28	5	23	0	
1999	MAC	Louie Berndt	52	24	28	0	25	8	17	0	
2000	MAC	Shonda Stanton	52	25	27	0	24	15	9	0	
2001	MAC	Shonda Stanton	58	35	23	0	24	15	9	0	
2002	MAC	Shonda Stanton	46	18	28	0	24	11	13	0	
2003	MAC	Shonda Stanton	58	41	17	0	24	20	4	0	MAC champions
2004	MAC	Shonda Stanton	58	31	27	0	24	12	12	0	
2005	MAC	Shonda Stanton	58	38	20	0	24	20	4	0	MAC champions
2006	C-USA	Shonda Stanton	56	33	23	0	24	15	9	0	
2007	C-USA	Shonda Stanton	58	32	26	0	24	11	13	0	
2008	C-USA	Shonda Stanton	55	26	29	0	22	11	11	0	
2009	C-USA	Shonda Stanton	51	31	20	0	21	11	10	0	
2010	C-USA	Shonda Stanton	55	24	30	1	24	3	20	1	
2011	C-USA	Shonda Stanton	53	19	33	1	23	5	17	1	
2012	C-USA	Shonda Stanton	57	36	21	0	24	15	9	0	
2013	C-USA	Shonda Stanton	58	36	22	0	23	13	10	0	C-USA tournament champions, NCAA Regional
2014	C-USA	Shonda Stanton	59	28	31	0	24	13	11	0	
2015	C-USA	Shonda Stanton	50	35	15	0	22	14	8	0	
2016	C-USA	Shonda Stanton	56	30	26	0	24	13	11	0	
2017	C-USA	Shonda Stanton	54	42	12	0	24	20	4	0	C-USA champions, NCAA Regional
2018	C-USA	Jennifer Steele	55	25	29	1	23	13	9	1	
2019	C-USA	Megan Smith	64	42	22	0	24	17	7	0	
2020	C-USA	Megan Smith	25	18	7	0	0	0	0	0	Season canceled due to the COVID-19 pandemic
2021	C-USA	Megan Smith	33	20	13	0	16	8	8	0	
2022	C-USA	Megan Smith	53	35	18	0	24	15	9	0	
2023	Sun Belt	Megan Smith	55	45	10	0	22	17	5	0	
2024	Sun Belt	Morgan Zerkle	53	25	28	0	24	10	14	0	
2025	Sun Belt	Morgan Zerkle	54	31	23	0	24	15	9	0	
2026	Sun Belt	Morgan Zerkle	57	38	19	0	24	17	7	0	NCAA Regional
