= Chelsea Thomas =

American softball player

- Born: January 26, 1990 (age 35); Des Moines, Iowa, U.S.

Teams
- Missouri Tigers (2009–2013)

Career highlights and awards
- 2× Big 12 Pitcher of the Year (2011, 2012); SEC Pitcher of the Year (2013)
Medals
Women's softball
Representing United States
Pan American Games
Gold medal – first place	2011 Guadalajara	Team

Chelsea Rae Thomas (born January 26, 1990) is an American former collegiate softball pitcher, originally from Pleasantville, Iowa. Thomas pitched for the Missouri Tigers in the Big 12 Conference and Southeastern Conference; Thomas is the career leader in wins and strikeouts for the school. She ranks top-10 for no hitters (11) and perfect games (3) in the NCAA Division I. Thomas and was drafted #20 in the National Pro Fastpitch and won a title in 2014.

== Early life and education ==
Born in Des Moines, Iowa, Thomas attended Pleasantville High School. She completed her Bachelor of Science degree in biology in fall 2012 and a Master of Education in counseling in fall 2013.

== Career ==
Thomas debuted on February 14, defeating the Virginia Tech Hokies in a shutout, allowing a hit and fanning three batters. She would no hit the Southeast Missouri Redhawks on March 7. During her sophomore year, Thomas set a career best with 14 strikeouts in regulation, winning against the Illinois State Redbirds on March 14 before having to redshirt the year because of injury.

In 2011, Thomas was named Big-12 Pitcher of The Year and led the Nation in ERA. On March 2, she pitched a perfect game against the Drake Bulldogs with 11 strikeouts. Thomas would go on to defeat the Oklahoma Sooners on April 16 and totaled 17 strikeouts and combined with Keilani Ricketts for 33 total for a top NCAA single game record. She led the Tigers into the 2011 Women's College World Series and help set the combined strikeout record (30) at the World Series by throwing a career best 19 strikeouts in a 13-inning loss to the Baylor Bears on June 4. Thomas earned a second Pitcher of The Year citation and tossed 46.0 consecutive scoreless innings for a career highlight in 2012.

In her final year, Thomas crossed 1,000 strikeouts for her career vs. the Mississippi Rebels on March 15 with four in two innings. She claimed her 100th career victory run-rule defeating the Missouri State Bears on April 3. Thomas made her final appearance losing to the Washington Huskies on May 24, fanning four in a 1–0 two-hitter. Thomas was named 2013 SEC Pitcher of the Year.

As a member of the United States women's national softball team she won 2011 World Cup of Softball. In 2013, she played professional softball for the USSSA Pride in the National Pro Fastpitch league. She is currently an assistant coach of the McKendree University softball team.

== Statistics ==
=== Missouri Tigers ===
YEAR	W	L	GP	GS	CG	SHO	SV	IP	H	R	ER	BB	SO	ERA	WHIP
2009	16	7	27	24	16	10	0	148.2	100	47	35	46	116	1.65	0.98
2010	12	1	14	12	8	3	0	77.1	42	21	19	24	123	1.72	0.85
2011	32	8	44	40	31	13	3	271.1	146	45	37	53	397	0.95	0.73
2012	27	9	39	35	23	12	3	229.1	128	46	38	80	306	1.16	0.91
2013	24	6	35	35	19	8	0	198.1	110	45	33	55	232	1.16	0.83
TOTALS	111	31	159	146	97	46	6	925.0	526	204	162	258	1174	1.22	0.84
