= Keilani Ricketts =

American softball player (born 1991)

Carolina Blaze
- Pitcher
- Born: September 1, 1991 (age 34); San Jose, California, U.S.
- Bats: Left Throws: Left

Professional debut
- NCAA: 2010, for the Oklahoma Sooners
- NPF: 2013, for the USSSA Pride

Teams
- Oklahoma Sooners (2010–2013); USSSA Pride (2013–2018); Oklahoma City Spark (2023–2024); Carolina Blaze (2025–present)

Career highlights and awards
- All-NPF Team (2017, 2018); 2× USA Softball Collegiate Player of the Year (2012, 2013); Women's College World Series Champion (2013); NFCA First Team (2013); Women's College World Series Most Outstanding Player (2013); Big 12 Pitcher of the Year (2013); All-Big 12 Defensive Team (2013); Honda Sports Award (softball) (2012); Honda Cup Winner (2013); NFCA First Team All-American (2011-2013); NFCA Second Team All-American (2010); Big 12 Player of the Year (2012); 4× All-Big 12 First Team; Big 12 Championship Most Outstanding Player (2010)
Medals
Women's softball
Representing United States
Pan American Games
Gold medal – first place	2011 Guadalajara	Team
Gold medal – first place	2019 Lima	Team

Keilani Johanna Ricketts Tumanuvao (née Ricketts; born September 1, 1991) is an American professional softball player for the Carolina Blaze of the Athletes Unlimited Softball League (AUSL). She played college softball at Oklahoma from 2010 to 2013, where she was the starting pitcher and helped to lead the Sooners to the national championship in 2013. As a member of the United States women's national softball team she won 2011 World Cup of Softball. She is the Sooners career leader in wins and strikeouts. She also ranks for career records in both the Big 12 Conference and the NCAA Division I, where she is one three players to win 100 games with 1,000 strikeouts and hit 50 home runs.

== Playing Career ==
=== Oklahoma Sooners ===
Ricketts debuted on February 10, 2010 tossing three scoreless innings to beat the Florida Atlantic Owls. She was named Second-Team National Fastpitch Coaches' Association All-American along with First-Team All-Big 12 honors. As a freshman, she would break the record for strikeout ratio and then rank second for strikeouts overall at the school. Ricketts would lead the team into a Super Regional with the Washington Huskies and opened the series by beating National Player of The Year Danielle Lawrie before dropping the next two to be eliminated that year.

In her sophomore year, Ricketts would be named a First-Team All-American and earned her second conference honors. Ricketts would break her own and set the school record for strikeout ratio with a career best 11.1 per 7-innings. She also broke the school strikeouts record, which now ranks second all-time.

On April 16, 2011, Ricketts lost a 9-inning contest vs. the Missouri Tigers and combined with Tiger pitcher Chelsea Thomas to record 33 strikeouts, an NCAA top-10 record. In the NCAA tournament, the Sooners opened up that year against the Iona Gaels and Ricketts set a career and school high with 19 strikeouts in regulation, winning 7-1 on May 20. The Sooners made the Women's College World Series that year by defeating the Arizona Wildcats but did not win a game.

As a junior, Ricketts again earned First-Team honors from both the NFCA and the conference, this time being named 2012 Big 12 Conference Player of the Year while also achieving a pitching Triple Crown. She was also chosen USA Softball Collegiate Player of the Year and recognized with the Honda Sports Award for softball. She would break her own strikeout record with a career and school best total, while her career high in wins ranks second all-time for the Sooners; Ricketts also had her best ERA and WHIP. Ricketts would also lead the team in batting average and doubles with career highs, which she also tallied in home runs, RBIs, hits, triples and slugging percentage.

Ricketts fired a perfect game over the Kansas Jayhawks on March 30 and struck out 10 batters to cross the 1,000 career benchmark, becoming one of the elite to reach that milestone in three seasons. On May 19, Ricketts hit a grand slam to help reach a career high with 6 RBIs vs. the Lehigh Mountain Hawks. At that year's WCWS on June 1, for her second game Ricketts pitched a 16-strikeout, 2 hit shutout over the No.1 California Golden Bears. The Sooners would go on to defeat the defending champs to meet the Alabama Crimson Tide in the championship final. Ricketts won game one but then lost back-to-back games to drop the series. Ricketts would be named All-Tournament for her performance, tying the third best record for WCWS strikeouts with 64.

For a final season, Ricketts claimed her fourth First Team all-conference and third First-Team and fourth overall All-American honors, simultaneously winning Big 12 Pitcher of the Year. She would also earn her second USA Softball Collegiate Player of the Year and Honda Sports Award for softball to accompany the Honda Cup Award. Ricketts had a career best in shutouts and winning percentage with a near perfect season while also throwing 6 no-hitters, a top-5 NCAA record for a single season.

February 9, 2013 she won her 100th game, no-hitting the Oregon Ducks. Beginning on March 27-June 3, she had a career best 21 game win streak. Ricketts led her team to a No. 1 seed and culminated in winning the National Championship by besting the Tennessee Lady Vols in a 12-inning game one and then driving in all the runs, three of them the winning runs coming via her 50th career home run off Ivy Renfroe, in game two to seal the title. This would give her the Most Outstanding Player Award and her second All-Tournament recognition.

Ricketts would also become one of the most prolific and winning pitchers in WCWS history going 8-4 with 112 strikeouts and allowing 19 earned runs in 80.1 inning for a 1.00 WHIP in three trips. For her career she holds the school records in wins, strikeouts, shutouts, innings pitched and strikeout ratio. In the Big 12 she ranks second in career wins, strikeouts and shutouts, third in strikeout ratio, fourth in innings and 7th in ERA; offensively she stands third in walks, fifth in home runs and 10th in slugging percentage. In all of the NCAA she is 7th in wins all-time.

=== Athletes Unlimited ===
On January 29, 2025, Ricketts was drafted twenty first overall by the Blaze in the inaugural Athletes Unlimited Softball League draft.

== Coaching Career ==
=== Mid-America Christian University ===
On May 24, 2023, Ricketts was named assistant coach (pitching) for the MACU Evangels.

=== University of the Pacific ===
On July 25, 2024, Ricketts was announced as the new assistant coach (pitching) for the Pacific Tigers.

== Personal life ==
Ricketts is of Samoan descent. She has three siblings including Richard, who played college football at Air Force, Stephanie, who played college softball and basketball at Hawaii, and Samantha, who played college softball at Oklahoma and professional softball in the NPF. Ricketts is married to Sean Tumanuvao and has one daughter.

== Awards and honors ==
- 2012—Winner of the Honda Sports Award for softball
- 2012—Winner of the USA Softball Collegiate Player of the Year
- 2013—Winner of the Honda Sports Award for softball
- 2013—Winner of the USA Softball Collegiate Player of the Year
- 2013—Premier Player of College Softball as voted by the fans
- 2013—The Honda-Broderick Cup winner for all sports.
- 2017 National Pro Fastpitch All-Star

== Statistics ==
University of Oklahoma
Year	W	L	GP	GS	CG	Sh	SV	IP	H	R	ER	BB	SO	ERA	WHIP
2010	32	10	48	38	29	14	2	259.2	136	63	46	91	346	1.24	0.87
2011	29	15	50	42	33	9	2	284.1	195	79	60	82	452	1.48	0.97
2012	37	9	49	43	34	15	2	292.0	163	64	45	51	457	1.08	0.73
2013	35	1	45	40	27	16	2	238.1	123	47	42	63	350	1.23	0.78
TOTALS	133	35	192	163	123	54	8	1074.1	617	253	193	287	1605	1.26	0.84

University of Oklahoma
YEAR	G	AB	R	H	BA	RBI	HR	3B	2B	TB	SLG	BB	SO	SB	SBA
2010	52	86	15	21	.244	20	5	0	2	38	.442%	28	35	0	1
2011	57	133	27	38	.285	45	13	0	2	79	.594%	38	39	1	1
2012	63	160	42	64	.400	49	17	2	13	132	.825%	53	31	6	7
2013	61	153	44	58	.379	60	15	0	8	111	.725%	51	33	9	9
TOTALS	233	532	128	181	.340	174	50	2	25	360	.676%	170	138	16	18

NPF USSSA Pride
YEAR	W	L	G	GS	CG	Sh	SV	IP	H	R	ER	BB	SO	ERA	WHIP
2013	3	3	9	7	2	0	1	35.0	35	25	22	21	43	4.40	1.60
2014	6	6	16	13	0	0	1	65.0	53	25	18	16	56	1.94	1.06
2015	7	5	14	12	4	1	0	76.0	62	34	28	16	83	2.58	1.02
2016	8	6	21	14	2	1	0	96.0	85	40	33	15	90	2.40	1.04
2017	11	4	18	13	0	0	1	80.2	67	21	17	12	82	1.48	0.98
2018	6	0	8	6	4	2	2	41.0	12	2	0	7	51	0.00	0.46
TOTAL	41	24	86	65	12	4	5	393.2	314	147	118	87	405	2.10	1.02

== See also ==
- NCAA Division I softball career strikeouts list
- NCAA Division I softball career wins list
