= List of NCAA Division I softball career win leaders =

There are currently 105 pitchers in the NCAA Division I 100 Wins Club:

Wins	Pitcher	School(s)	Years
189	Monica Abbott	Tennessee Lady Vols	2004–2007
151	Courtney Blades	Nicholls State Colonels & Southern Miss Golden Eagles	1997–2000
149	Debbie Nichols	Louisiana Tech Lady Techsters	1987–1990
144	Alicia Hollowell	Arizona Wildcats	2003–2006
139	Rhonda Wheatley	Cal Poly Broncos	1984–1987
136	Danielle Lawrie	Washington Huskies	2006–2010
136	Stacey Nelson	Florida Gators	2006–2009
136	Cat Osterman	Texas Longhorns	2002–2006
133	Keilani Ricketts	Oklahoma Sooners	2010–2013
130	Keira Goerl	UCLA Bruins	2001–2004
129	Olivia Galati	Hofstra Pride	2010–2013
129	Jolene Henderson	California Golden Bears	2010–2013
127	Hannah Rogers	Florida Gators	2011–2014
126	Brandice Balschmiter	UMass Minutewomen	2006–2009
123	Whitney Canion	Baylor Bears	2009–2014
123	Paige Parker	Oklahoma Sooners	2015–2018
123	Angela Tincher	Virginia Tech Hokies	2005–2008
122	Morgan Melloh	Fresno State Bulldogs & Indiana Hoosiers	2008–2011
120	Sarah Dawson	ULM Warhawks	1994–1997
120	Nancy Evans	Arizona Wildcats	1994–1998
120	Megan Good	James Madison Dukes	2015–2019
120	Britni Sneed	LSU Tigers	1999–2002
119	Jennie Finch	Arizona Wildcats	1999–2002
119	Michele Granger	California Golden Bears	1989–1993
119	Brooke Mitchell	ULL Ragin’ Cajuns	2002–2005
119	Missy Penna	Stanford Cardinal	2006–2009
118	Katie Burkhart	Arizona State Sun Devils	2005–2008
118	Amanda Macenko	Cleveland State Vikings	2007–2010
118	Tara Oltman	Creighton Bluejays	2007–2010
118	Toni Paisley	East Carolina Pirates	2007–2011
118	Jamie Southern	Fresno State Bulldogs	2001–2005
116	Debby Day	UTA Mavericks & Arizona Wildcats	1988–1992
116	Kristin Schmidt	Notre Dame Fighting Irish & LSU Tigers	2001–2004
115	Dallas Escobedo	Arizona State Sun Devils	2011–2014
115	Shelley Laird	Alabama Crimson Tide	1999–2002
115	Jennifer Stewart	Oklahoma Sooners	1999–2002
114	Shawn Andaya	Texas A&M Aggies	1984–1987
113	Morgan Childers	South Carolina Upstate Spartans	2008–2011
113	Kelsi Dunne	Alabama Crimson Tide	2008–2011
112	Blaire Luna	Texas Longhorns	2010–2013
112	Sara Moulton	Minnesota Golden Gophers	2011–2014
111	Samantha Iuli	UIC Flames	1997–2000
111	Chelsea Thomas	Missouri Tigers	2009–2013
110	Anjelica Selden	UCLA Bruins	2005–2008
110	Jenny Voss	Nebraska Cornhuskers	1997–2000
110	Laura Winter	Notre Dame Fighting Irish	2011–2014
109	Sara Plourde	UMass Minutewomen	2009–2012
109	Randi Rupp	Texas State Bobcats	2015–2018
109	Jessica Sallinger	Georgia Tech Yellow Jackets	2002–2005
109	Lacey Waldrop	FSU Seminoles	2012–2015
108	Lindsay Chouinard	DePaul Blue Demons	2000–2003
108	Cheridan Hawkins	Oregon Ducks	2013–2016
108	Danielle Henderson	UMass Minutewomen	1996–1999
108	Meghan King	FSU Seminoles	2016–2019
108	Nicole Myers	Florida Atlantic Owls	1999–2002
108	Lori Spingola	North Carolina Tar Heels	2011–2014
108	Emily Weiman	NC State Wolfpack	2012–2015
107	McKenna Bull	BYU Cougars	2014–2017
107	Terry Carpenter	Fresno State Bulldogs	1989–1992
107	Jordan Dixon	Marshall Thundering Herd	2014–2017
107	Sara Groenewegen	Minnesota Golden Gophers	2014–2017
107	Leslie Malerich	FSU Seminoles	1999–2002
107	Nicole Neuerburg	Texas State Bobcats	2001–2004
107	Jordan Taylor	Michigan Wolverines	2008–2011
106	Sara Griffin	Michigan Wolverines	1995–1998
106	Amanda Scott	Fresno State Bulldogs	1997–2000
106	Jackie Traina	Alabama Crimson Tide	2011–2014
106	Danielle Williams	Northwestern Wildcats	2019-2023
105	Dana Sorensen	Stanford Cardinal	2000–2004
105	Kirsten Verdun	DePaul Blue Demons	2011–2014
105	Stephani Williams	Kansas Jayhawks	1991–1994
104	Kelly Barnhill	Florida Gators	2016–2019
104	Melissa Dumezich	Texas A&M Aggies	2010–2013
104	Michelle Green	Georgia Bulldogs	2002–2005
104	Kyla Hall	ULL Ragin’ Cajuns	1991–1994
104	Michelle Hall	Coastal Carolina Chanticleers	1990–1993
103	Bonnie Bynum	Tennessee Tech Golden Eagles	2004–2007
103	Carrie Dolan	Arizona Wildcats	1994–1997
103	Jocelyn Forest	California Golden Bears	1999–2002
103	Becky Lemke	Arizona Wildcats	1998–2001
102	Darlene Gareis	South Carolina Gamecocks	1992–1995
102	Kami Keiter	Oklahoma Sooners	2002–2005
102	Jenny Parsons	East Carolina Pirates	1990–1993
102	Ellen Renfroe	Tennessee Lady Vols	2011–2014
102	Stephanie Ricketts	Hawaii Rainbow Wahine	2009–2012
102	Jessica Simpson	Miami Redhawks	2009–2012
102	Kristina Thorson	California Golden Bears	2003–2006
101	Megan Betsa	Michigan Wolverines	2014–2017
101	Tiffany Boyd	UCLA Bruins & Cal State Fullerton Titans	1989–1993
101	Teagan Gerhart	Stanford Cardinal	2010–2013
101	Megan Matthews	South Carolina Gamecocks	1999–2002
101	Laura Messina	Central Connecticut State Blue Devils	2012–2015
101	Jen Mineau	Fordham Rams	2009–2012
101	Sara Nevins	USF Bulls	2011–2014
101	Danielle O'Toole	San Diego State Aztecs & Arizona Wildcats	2013–2017
101	Susie Parra	Arizona Wildcats	1991–1994
100	Taran Alvelo	Washington Huskies	2016–2019
100	Ally Carda	UCLA Bruins	2012–2015
100	Angie Lear	South Carolina Gamecocks	1988–1991
100	Susan LeFebvre	Cal State Fullerton Titans	1983–1986
100	Brianne McGowan	Oregon State Beavers	2004–2007
100	Jessica Moore	Oregon Ducks	2010–2013
100	Taryne Mowatt	Arizona Wildcats	2005–2008
100	Jennifer Spediacci	Washington Huskies	1997–2000
100	Haylie Wagner	Michigan Wolverines	2012–2015

== Progression ==
Debbie Nichols won her 140th career game defeating the ULL Ragin’ Cajuns 3–1 on April 7, 1990, besting Rhonda Wheatley's original record. Courtney Blades passed Nichols for her 150th win pitching a perfect game against the Arizona Wildcats at the Women's College World Series on May 25, 2000. Monica Abbott won her 152nd game shutting out the Tennessee Tech Golden Eagles on March 3, 2007.

== Winning percentage ==
In addition, there are currently 25 pitchers in the 100 wins club that maintained a high winning percentage of at least 82%:

Nancy Evans (120-8 = 93%); Susie Parra (101-9 = 92%); Carrie Dolan (103-13 = 89%); Jennie Finch (119-16 = 88%); Megan Good (120-17 = 87%); Paige Parker (123-18 = 87%); Alicia Hollowell (144-23 = 86%); Keira Goerl (130-21 = 86%); Jordan Taylor (107-18 = 85%); Amanda Scott (106-18 = 85%); Sara Griffin (106-19 = 85%); Monica Abbott (189-34 = 84%); Meghan King (108-21 = 84%); Haylie Wagner (100-18 = 84%); Cat Osterman (136-25 = 84%); Becky Lemke (103-19 = 84%); Cheridan Hawkins (108-20 = 84%); Kelly Barnhill (104-20 = 84%); Kyla Hall (104-20 = 84%); Sara Groenewegen (107-21 = 83%); Jaclyn Traina (106-21 = 83%); Michelle Green (104-21 = 83%); Kelsi Dunne (113-23 = 83%); Britni Sneed (120-25 = 82%); Susan LeFebvre (100-21 = 82%); Jennifer Stewart (115-25 = 82%).

== Records and milestones ==
Courtney Blades won an NCAA record 52 games in 2000, setting the all-time Senior Class record for the Division I. Jennie Finch had the best perfect season in 2001, going 32–0; Jaclyn Traina and Keilani Ricketts each had two of the winningest seasons in 2012 and 2013, respectively going 42-3 and 35–1. Sara Plourde won just 6 games as a freshman in 2009, the minimum in a non-injury season for the club. Finch also won an NCAA record 60 consecutive games from 2000 to 2002; Olivia Galati, Alicia Hollowell and Paige Parker (32 consecutive each in 2012, 2004 and 2016-17 respectively) and Sara Griffin (30 consecutive in 1998) also had top-10 win streaks. Monica Abbott went 50–9 in 2005 and 45–10 in 2004, the Sophomore and Freshman Class win records; Debbie Nichols originally set the Sophomore Class record (50–8) in 1988. Stacey Nelson owns the Junior Class win record with a 47–5 record in 2008.

Along with Blades in 2000, Traina in 2012, Abbott in 2004–2005, Nichols in 1988 and Nelson in 2008, Rhonda Wheatley (48–16 in 1985), Brooke Mitchell (45–5 in 2004), Sarah Dawson (45–10 in 1997), Abbott (44–10 in 2006), Blades (43–6 in 1999), Danielle Lawrie (42-8 & 40–5 in 2009–2010), Morgan Melloh (42–9 in 2008), Taryne Mowatt (42–12 in 2007), Nelson (41–5 in 2009), Katie Burkhart (41–5 in 2008), Nichols (41–13 in 1989), Galati (40–12 in 2013), Jolene Henderson (40–10 in 2011), Plourde (40–8 in 2010), Hollowell (40-5 & 41–4 in 2003 & 2004), Keira Goerl (40–7 in 2003) and Jenny Voss (40–9 in 1998) all rank top-10 for wins in an NCAA season. Also with Wheatley in 1985, Nichols in 1988, Dawson in 1997, Voss in 1998, Blades in 1999–2000, Hollowell in 2003, Goerl in 2003, Mitchell in 2004, Abbott in 2004–2007, Nelson in 2008, Lawrie in 2009–2010, Plourde in 2010, Henderson in 2011, Traina in 2012 and Galati in 2013, Shawn Andaya (36–6 in 1987), Jenny Parson (38–13 in 1992), Carrie Dolan (33-2 & 35–6 in 1995–1996), Griffin (35–7 in 1996), Nicole Myers (36–7 in 2002), Cat Osterman (36–8 in 2002), Lacey Waldrop (38–7 in 2014), Parker (38–3 in 2016) and Megan Good (38–3 in 2017) all led the NCAA for wins in those years.

Finally, along with Ricketts in 2013, Traina in 2012, Lawrie in 2009, Burkhart in 2008, Mowatt in 2006 (21–5) and 2007, Goerl in 2003, Finch in 2001, Dolan in 1996 and Andaya in 1987, Tiffany Boyd (19–2 in 1989), Debby Day (30–8 in 1991), Susie Parra (28-3 & 33–1 in 1993–1994), Nancy Evans (36–2 in 1997), Amanda Scott (25–4 in 1998), Jennifer Stewart (34–6 in 2000), Becky Lemke (19–2 in 2001), Jocelyn Forest (29–12 in 2002), Goerl (31–7 in 2004), Hollowell (32–5 in 2006), Dallas Escobedo (37–3 in 2011), Hannah Rogers (30–8 in 2014), Parker (38-3 & 26–5 in 2016–2017) and Meghan King (26–6 in 2018) all won National Championships those years; Mowatt also set the Women's College World Series record for wins with 6 in 2007. For their careers Abbott (SEC), Hollowell (Pac-12), Osterman (Big 12), Galati (CAA), Brandice Balschmiter (A-10), Tincher (ACC), Dawson (Southland), Brooke Mitchell (Sun Belt), Amanda Macenko (Horizon), Tara Oltman (MVC), Toni Paisley (USA), Jamie Southern (WAC), Wheatley (Big West in three seasons with 114 wins), Morgan Childers (A-Sun), Sara Moulton (Big Ten), McKenna Bull (WCC), Kirsten Verdun (Big East), Michelle Hall (Big South), Bonnie Bynum (OVC), Jessica Simpson (MAC) and Laura Messina (NEC) all own the wins crown for these conferences.

== See also ==
- List of NCAA Division I softball career ERA leaders
- List of NCAA Division I softball career strikeout leaders
