= List of NCAA Division I softball career strikeout leaders =

There are currently 99 pitchers in the 1,000 Strikeout Club:

Strikeouts	Pitcher	School(s)	Years
2,440	Monica Abbott	Tennessee Lady Vols	2004–2007
2,265	Cat Osterman	Texas Longhorns	2002–2006
2,149	Angela Tincher	Virginia Tech Hokies	2005–2008
1,860	Danielle Lawrie	Washington Huskies	2006–2010
1,773	Courtney Blades	Nicholls State Colonels & Southern Miss Golden Eagles	1997–2000
1,768	Alicia Hollowell	Arizona Wildcats	2003–2006
1,670	Katie Burkhart	Arizona State Sun Devils	2005–2008
1,662	Sara Plourde	UMass Minutewomen	2009–2012
1,640	Michele Granger	California Golden Bears	1989–1993
1,632	Morgan Melloh	Fresno State Bulldogs & Indiana Hoosiers	2008–2011
1,605	Keilani Ricketts	Oklahoma Sooners	2010–2013
1,473	Whitney Canion	Baylor Bears	2009–2014
1,441	Anjelica Selden	UCLA Bruins	2005–2008
1,428	Blaire Luna	Texas Longhorns	2010–2013
1,415	Olivia Galati	Hofstra Pride	2010–2013
1,398	Jessica Sallinger	Georgia Tech Yellow Jackets	2002–2005
1,390	Jen Mineau	Fordham Rams	2009–2012
1,376	Nicole Myers	FAU Owls	1999–2002
1,370	Sarah Pauly	Corpus Christi Islanders	2003–2005
1,370	Britni Sneed	LSU Tigers	1999–2002
1,343	Danielle Henderson	UMass Minutewomen	1996–1999
1,338	Morgan Childers	South Carolina Upstate Spartans	2008–2011
1,321	Jamie Southern	Fresno State Bulldogs	2001–2005
1,309	Brooke Mitchell	ULL Ragin’ Cajuns	2002–2005
1,305	Ashlyn Williams	Troy Trojans	2008–2011
1,302	Georgina Corrick	USF Bulls	2018-2022
1,290	Toni Paisley	East Carolina Pirates	2007–2011
1,280	Sarah Dawson	ULM Warhawks	1994–1997
1,270	Randi Rupp	Texas State Bobcats	2015–2018
1,267	Missy Penna	Stanford Cardinal	2006–2009
1,267	Taryne Mowatt	Arizona Wildcats	2005–2008
1,258	Kylie Reynolds	Kent State Golden Flashes	2007–2010
1,234	Shawn Andaya	Texas A&M Aggies	1984–1987
1,226	Amanda Renfro	Texas Tech Red Raiders	1998–2001
1,223	Nicole Newman	Drake Bulldogs	2015–2019
1,222	Dallas Escobedo	Arizona State Sun Devils	2011–2014
1,220	Jordan Taylor	Michigan Wolverines	2008–2011
1,219	Kelsi Dunne	Alabama Crimson Tide	2008–2011
1,218	Brandice Balschmiter	UMass Minutewomen	2006–2009
1,214	Sara Groenewegen	Minnesota Golden Gophers	2014–2017
1,208	Kelly Barnhill	Florida Gators	2016–2019
1,205	Crystal Cox	North Carolina Tar Heels	2003–2006
1,205	Jennie Ritter	Michigan Wolverines	2003–2006
1,204	Miranda Kramer	Fort Wayne Mastodons & Western Kentucky Hilltoppers	2012–2015
1,203	Jocelyn Forest	California Golden Bears	1999–2002
1,201	Megan Betsa	Michigan Wolverines	2014–2017
1,200	Lisa Ishikawa	Northwestern Wildcats	1984–1987
1,194	Savannah Jo Dorsey	Ohio Bobcats	2013–2017
1,184	Sara Moulton	Minnesota Golden Gophers	2011–2014
1,174	Chelsea Thomas	Missouri Tigers	2009–2013
1,163	Montana Fouts	Alabama Crimson Tide	2019–2023
1,163	Trinity Johnson	Cal State Fullerton Titans & South Carolina Gamecocks	1994–1997
1,156	Andrea Kirchberg	Wisconsin Badgers	2000–2003
1,156	Mellissa Santos	Fairfield Stags	2000–2003
1,154	Kristin Schmidt	Notre Dame Fighting Irish & LSU Tigers	2001–2004
1,154	Dana Sorensen	Stanford Cardinal	2000–2004
1,151	Lauren Bay Regula	Oklahoma State Cowgirls	2000–2003
1,142	Eileen Canney	Northwestern Wildcats	2004–2007
1,130	Lauren Delaney	Northwestern Wildcats	2007–2010
1,124	Jolene Henderson	California Golden Bears	2010–2013
1,122	Piper Marten	Minnesota Golden Gophers	2001–2004
1,120,	Keely Rochard	Virginia Tech Hokies	2018–2022
1,118	Whitney Kiihnl	Lipscomb Bisons	2009–2012
1,116	Stacey Nelson	Florida Gators	2006–2009
1,115	Jordan Dixon	Marshall Thundering Herd	2014–2017
1,113	Stephanie VanBrakle	Alabama Crimson Tide	2002–2006
1,111	Samantha Iuli	UIC Flames	1997–2000
1,103	Sara Nevins	USF Bulls	2011–2014
1,101	Melanie Mitchell	Virginia Cavaliers	2010–2013
1,095	Keira Goerl	UCLA Bruins	2001–2004
1,091	Abbie Sims	NC State Wolfpack	2004–2007
1,090	Megan Matthews	South Carolina Gamecocks	1999–2002
1,089	Amy Unterbrink	Indiana Hoosiers	1983–1986
1,086	Tara Oltman	Creighton Bluejays	2007–2010
1,083	Brittany Weil	Iowa Hawkeyes	2006–2009
1,081	Cheridan Hawkins	Oregon Ducks	2013–2016
1,080	Lori Spingola	North Carolina Tar Heels	2011–2014
1,079	Aimee Creger	Tulsa Golden Hurricane	2011–2014
1,078	Anna Thompson	Auburn Tigers	2007–2010
1,077	Laura Winter	Notre Dame Fighting Irish	2011–2014
1,071	Kristina Thorson	California Golden Bears	2003–2006
1,070	Michelle Green	Georgia Bulldogs	2002–2005
1,063	Alexis Osorio	Alabama Crimson Tide	2015–2018
1,059	Amanda Macenko	Cleveland State Vikings	2007–2010
1,056	Emily Weiman	NC State Wolfpack	2012–2015
1,050	Kelsie Armstrong	Central Arkansas Bears	2010–2013
1,045	Shelley Laird	Alabama Crimson Tide	1999–2002
1,041	Jenna Caira	Syracuse Orange	2009–2012
1,037	Kelly Shipman	Maryland Terrapins	1996–1999
1,036	Darcy Wood	Indiana State Sycamores	2005–2009
1,028	Jennie Finch	Arizona Wildcats	1999–2002
1,023	Courtney Coppersmith	UMBC Retrievers	2019-2023
1,021	Bonnie Bynum	Tennessee Tech Golden Eagles	2004–2007
1,021	Jessica Simpson	Miami Redhawks	2009–2012
1,019	Nicole Neuerburg	Texas State Bobcats	2001–2004
1,014	Courtnay Foster	Northwestern Wildcats	2003–2006
1,013	Leanna Johnson	Troy Trojans	2019–2023
1,008	Alex Storako	Michigan Wolverines & Oklahoma Sooners	2019-2023
1,005	Sarah Hamilton	FSU Seminoles	2008–2011
1,005	Ellen Renfroe	Tennessee Lady Vols	2011–2014

== Progression ==
Shawn Andaya broke the original strikeout record by Amy Unterbrink during her 1987 campaign. Michele Granger struck out her 1,235th batter on February 22, 1993, shutting out the Northwestern Wildcats 8–0. Courtney Blades struck out her 1,641st batter on May 6, 2000, defeating the USF Bulls in relief.

Cat Osterman surpassed Courtney Blades' career strikeout total on 25 February 2006, striking out Brittany Bolinger of the UNLV Lady Rebels. Monica Abbott went on to surpass Osterman's total on 6 May 2007, striking out Charlotte Morgan of the Alabama Crimson Tide.

Angela Tincher became just the third pitcher to reach the 2,000 strikeout plateau on April 30, 2008, striking out Sissy Jimenez of the East Carolina Pirates.

== Strikeout Ratio ==
In addition, there are currently 26 pitchers in the 1,000 Strikeouts Club that averaged double-digit strikeouts for their career from a list of 33 NCAA career records:

No. 1 Cat Osterman (7IP = 14.3Ks); No. 2 Angela Tincher (7IP = 13.4Ks); No. 3 Sara Plourde (7IP = 12.0Ks); No. 4 Monica Abbott (7IP = 11.7Ks); No. 6 Sarah Pauly (7IP = 11.5Ks); No. 7 Alicia Hollowell (7IP = 11.0Ks); No. 8 Danielle Lawrie (7IP = 10.9Ks); No. 9 Blaire Luna (7IP = 10.9Ks); No. 10 Miranda Kramer (7IP = 10.9Ks); No. 11 Nicole Newman (7IP = 10.8Ks); No. 12 Megan Betsa (7IP = 10.7Ks); No. 13 Katie Burkhart (7IP = 10.7Ks); No. 15 Sara Groenewegen (7IP = 10.6Ks); No. 16 Anna Thompson (7IP = 10.5Ks); No. 17 Kelly Barnhill (7IP = 10.5Ks); No. 18 Keilani Ricketts (7IP = 10.4Ks); No. 20 Kylie Reynolds (7IP = 10.2Ks); No. 21 Taryne Mowatt (7IP = 10.1Ks); No. 22 Jennie Ritter (7IP = 10.1Ks); No. 23 Brooke Mitchell (7IP = 10.0Ks); No. 25 Morgan Childers (7IP = 10.0Ks); No. 27 Jordan Taylor (7IP = 10.0Ks); No. 29 Sarah Hamilton (7IP = 10.0Ks); No. 31 Jen Mineau (7IP = 10.0Ks); No. 32 Anjelica Selden (7IP = 10.0Ks); No. 33 Aimee Creger (7IP = 10.0Ks).

== Records & Milestones ==
Eileen Canney tied the NCAA and Junior Class records for single game strikeouts with 28 in 2006. Angela Tincher struck out the Sophomore Class record of 26 and NCAA top-10 record with 19 in 7-innings on five different occasions. Michele Granger struck out the Senior Class record 26 strikeouts and set the NCAA record for a 7-inning game with 21 in 1993. Nicole Myers struck out 25 in 2001; Danielle Lawrie and Cat Osterman each fanned 24 and 20 (7-innings), with Osterman tallying 24 twice. Darcy Wood, Katie Burkhart (who did it twice), Lauren Bay Regula and Anjelica Selden each struck out 23. Jamie Southern, Monica Abbott, Sara Plourde, Jen Mineau, Brooke Mitchell, Savannah Jo Dorsey and Kristina Thorson each nabbed 22 strikeout games. Alexis Osorio recorded 21 strikeouts to tie the NCAA single regulation game record. Alicia Hollowell, Abbott and Plourde also each struck out 20 in 7-innings, Hollowell and Plourde tying for the Sophomore Class record and Abbott setting the Freshman Class record for a regulation game. Sarah Pauly, Keilani Ricketts and Miranda Kramer struck out 19 in 7-innings. Finally, Lisa Ishikawa, Kelsie Armstrong, Kelly Barnhill, Courtney Blades, Burkhart, Jenna Caira, Morgan Childers, Courtnay Foster, Danielle Henderson (did it three times), Trinity Johnson, Taryne Mowatt, Nicole Newman, Mellissa Santos, Anna Thompson, Amy Unterbrink and Stephanie VanBrakle all whiffed 18 in 7-innings. Note: these totals represent the top-10 single game totals in a game of any length for the club up to the 7-inning game records, as well as only each pitchers' personal career highlights within that top-10 list.

Monica Abbott set the NCAA season and Senior Class records with 724 strikeouts in 2007; she also set the Sophomore and Freshman Class records with 603 and 582 respectively. Sara Plourde struck out the least in a non-injury season for the list with just 67 in 2009. Angela Tincher set the Junior Class record with 617 in 2007. Cat Osterman set the single season strikeout ratio at 15.4 in 2006, she struck out 630 that season. She also owns the Junior (15.2) and Sophomore (14.1) ratio marks in addition. Tincher (679 in 2008), Courtney Blades (663 in 2000), Osterman in 2006, (593 & 554 in 2005 & 2002) and Plourde (556 in 2010) all rank top-10 for season strikeouts in the NCAA. Abbott (14.1 in 2007), Danielle Henderson (13.9 with 465 strikeouts in 1999), Tincher (13.8, 13.8 & 13.7 in 2008, 2007 and 2006 with 504) all rank top-10 for strikeout ratio in an NCAA season; Osterman owns the career ratio of 14.3, while Amanda Macenko has the lowest ratio for the list at 6.6 for her career. Along with Blades in 2000, Osterman in 2002–2006, Abbott in 2004 & 2007, Tincher in 2008 and Plourde in 2010, Lisa Ishikawa (469 in 1984), Amy Unterbrink (370 in 1986), Shawn Andaya (326 in 1987), Michele Granger (327, 463, 329 & 484 in 1990–1993), Trinity Johnson (367 & 399 in 1995 & 1997), Henderson (430 in 1998), Blades (497 in 1999), Amanda Renfroe (421 in 2001), Danielle Lawrie (521 in 2009), Plourde (498 & 541 in 2011–2012), Blaire Luna (422 in 2013), Aimee Creger (354 in 2014), Miranda Kramer (439 in 2015), Savannah Jo Dorsey and Sara Groenewegen (both 336 in 2016), Megan Betsa (412 in 2017), Nicole Newman (423 in 2019) all led the NCAA for strikeouts those years. Granger (strikeout ratios 8.2 & 10.4 in 1990–1991), Johnson (strikeout ratio 11.5 in 1997), Henderson (strikeout ratio 11.8 in 1998 and ratio in 1999), Blades (strikeout ratio 11.6 in 2000), Nicole Myers (strikeout ratio 10.9 in 2001 with 403 strikeouts), Osterman (strikeout ratio 12.7 in 2002 and ratios in 2003–2006), Alicia Hollowell (strikeout ratio 12.1 in 2004 with 508 strikeouts), Abbott (ratio in 2007), Tincher (ratio in 2008), Plourde (strikeout ratios 12.5 & 12.2 in 2010 & 2012), Luna (strikeout ratio 11.7 in 2013), Groenewegen (strikeout ratio 11.5 in 2014), Kramer (strikeout ratio 12.6 in 2015), Kelly Barnhill (strikeout ratio 13.0 in 2017) and Newman (strikeout ratio 13.3 in 2019) all led in strikeout ratio for those years in the NCAA.

Finally, along with Lawrie in 2009 with 49 strikeouts at the WCWS and Andaya in 1987 also with 49 at the WCWS, Jennie Finch (279 & 26 strikeouts at WCWS in 2001), Jocelyn Forest (379 & 33 strikeouts at WCWS in 2002), Keira Goerl (342 & 44 strikeouts at WCWS in 2003; 276 & 22 strikeouts at WCWS in 2004), Jennie Ritter (417 & 60 strikeouts at WCWS in 2005), Hollowell (420 & 64 strikeouts at WCWS in 2006), Taryne Mowatt (250 strikeouts in 2006 and 522 & 76 at WCWS in 2007), Katie Burkhart (513 & 54 strikeouts at WCWS in 2008), Dallas Escobedo (326 & 38 strikeouts at WCWS in 2011) and Keilani Ricketts (350 & 39 strikeouts at the WCWS in 2013) all won National Championships those years; Mowatt set the Women's College World Series strikeout record in 2007. For their careers Abbott (SEC), Osterman (Big 12), Tincher (ACC), Lawrie (Pac-12), Plourde (A-10), Galati (CAA), Myers (A-Sun), Pauly (Big South in three seasons), Jamie Southern (WAC), Mitchell (Sun Belt), Toni Paisley (USA), Sarah Dawson (Southland), Kylie Reynolds (MAC), Nicole Newman (MVC), Jordan Taylor (Big Ten), Santos (MAAC), Samantha Iuli (Horizon), Caira (Big East) and Bonnie Bynum (OVC) all own the strikeouts crown for these conferences.

== See also ==
- List of NCAA Division I softball career ERA leaders
- List of NCAA Division I softball career win leaders
