= Taryne Mowatt =

American softball player (born 1986)

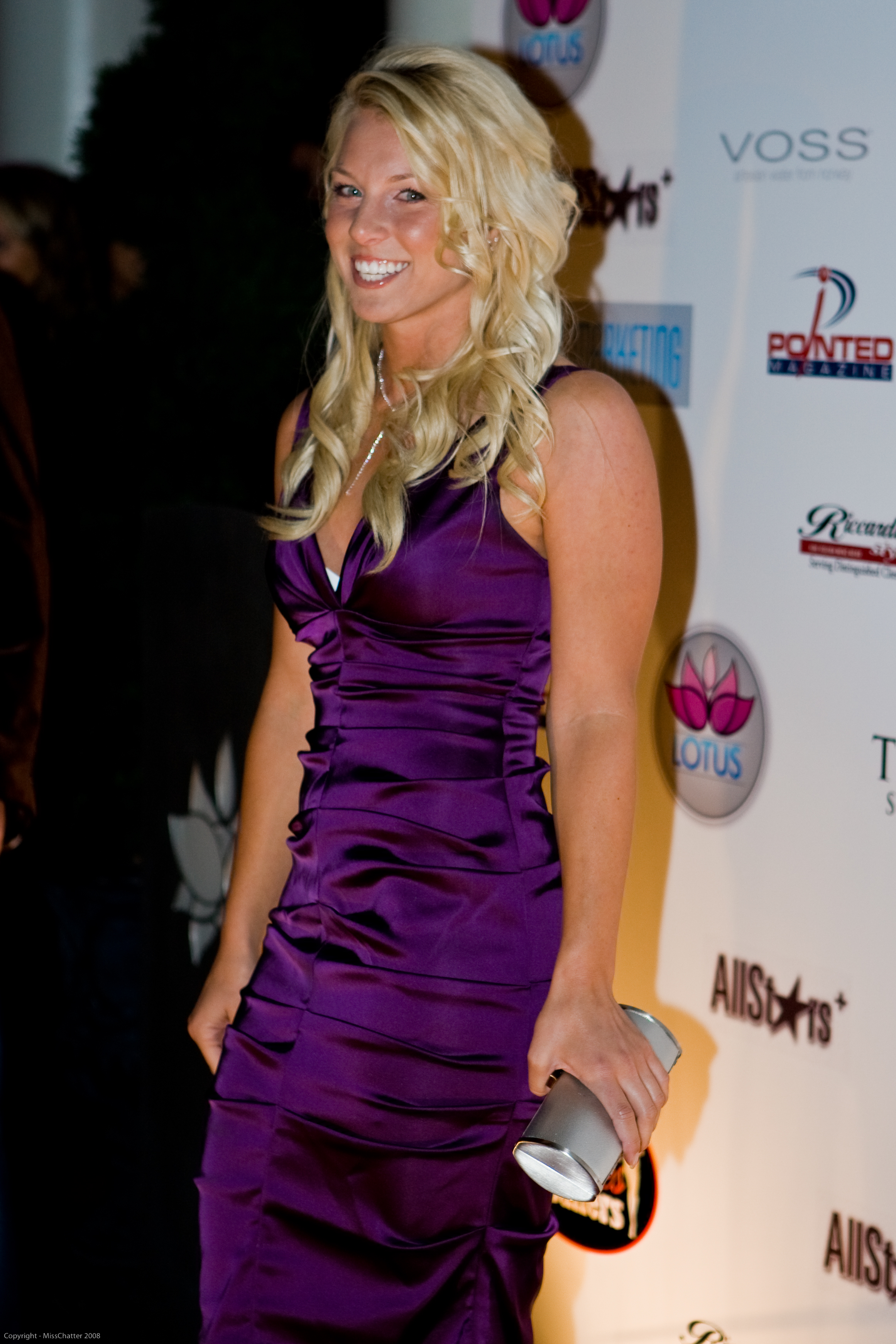
- Mowatt in 2008

Current position
- Title: Pitching coach
- Team: Mississippi State
- Conference: SEC

Biographical details
- Born: September 12, 1986 (age 39); Orange County, California, U.S.

Playing career
- 2005–2008: Arizona
- 2008: Washington Glory
- 2010: Akron Racers
- 2011: Chicago Bandits
- 2013: New York Comets
- Position: Pitcher

Coaching career (HC unless noted)
- 2012–2014: California Baptist (pitching)
- 2015–2017: Ole Miss (pitching)
- 2018–2023: Arizona (pitching)
- 2023–present: Mississippi State (pitching)

Accomplishments and honors

Championships
- As player: 2× Women's College World Series (2006, 2007); 2× Pac-10 (2005, 2007); As assistant coach: 2× PacWest (2012, 2014)

Awards
- WCWS Most Outstanding Player (2007); 2× All-WCWS Team (2006, 2007); NFCA second-team All-American (2007); Best Female Athlete ESPY (2007); First-team All-Pac-10 (2007); Second-team All-Pac-10 (2008)

Taryne Lee Mowatt (born September 12, 1986) is an American former collegiate All-American, right-handed hitting, retired pro softball pitcher. Mowatt is the current pitching coach for Mississippi State. She played college softball at Arizona and helped them win the 2006 and 2007 Women's College World Series. From 2008 to 2013, Mowatt played professionally in National Pro Fastpitch, selected in the 2008 NPF draft by the Washington Glory. She ranks in several pitching categories for the Wildcats and holds the Women's College World Series records for strikeouts and wins.

== College career ==
Mowatt graduated from Santiago High School in Corona, California in 2004.

As a freshman at the University of Arizona in 2005, Mowatt began her career a perfect 7-0 in limited appearances for the Arizona Wildcats softball team. She debuted on February 4 vs. the Kansas Jayhawks, nabbing a victory by pitching 5 innings and striking out four batters. The Michigan Wolverines handed her the only loss for that year on March 21, 2005.

As a sophomore, Mowatt had career bests in ERA, WHIP and strikeout ratio (10.7). She threw 3 no-hitters and a perfect game. On February 26, 2006, Mowatt struck out 18 of the Tennessee Tech Golden Eagles for a career best strikeouts in regulation. The total tied her for the fourth best 7-inning single game total in the NCAA.

Mowatt threw her first no-hitter on March 16, 2006, vs. the UNLV Rebels. Two days later Mowatt did it better in a 5-inning, 13 strikeouts, 9-0 perfect game against the Cal State Northridge Matadors. It was the eighth perfect game overall for the Wildcats and she being just the third pitcher to accomplish the feat. Mowatt connected for a three-run homer for her single game best in RBIs off Anjelica Selden of the UCLA Bruins on April 9. On April 22, Mowatt and California Golden Bears' Kristina Thorson combined for 38 strikeouts, which was third best (now 7th) all-time in the NCAA; the Wildcats won 4-2 in 13-innings. In the Super Regionals vs. the LSU Tigers, Mowatt was a perfect 4/4 at the plate for another career best in hits, the run-rule victory sent the Wildcats into the WCWS on May 27.

Mowatt hit her third home run in Game One and in the finale of the 2006 Women's College World Series National Championship series against the Northwestern Wildcats, she had two hits; Mowatt would bat close to .400 at the series and .290 for the season. Mowatt was selected to the WCWS All-Tournament Team after Arizona won its seventh title.

Mowatt's collegiate career was marked by her junior season where she pitched 3 no-hitters, tied, broke and set school and Pac-10 conference records with her wins and strikeouts. Mowatt was also honored All Pac-10 and Second Team All-American.

For her 60-innings, 76 strikeouts, 4 shutouts performance at the 2007 Women's College World Series, she was named to the All-Tournament Team and earned the "Most Outstanding Player" Award in her victorious bid for the national title. She also set new WCWS records for wins (6) and strikeouts, the latter was previously held by former teammate and then assistant coach Alicia Hollowell. Later that year Mowatt also won two ESPY Awards; Best Female Athlete and Best Female College Athlete.

In her senior season, Mowatt tied Hollowell's single game strikeout record at Arizona by fanning a career best 20 batters on March 1, 2008 against the Virginia Tech Hokies. In that same game, Mowatt and Angela Tincher set a new NCAA Division I record for combined strikeouts at 41 and is now top-5 all-time. In a shutout win over the DePaul Blue Demons on March 20, she earned her 1000th career strikeout. Beginning on May 3, Mowatt started two career streaks, with a shutout win over the Washington Huskies for 27.0 consecutive scoreless innings and 9 consecutive wins. The scoreless innings were snapped by the Stanford Cardinal when they led off with a run on May 10. For that streak, Mowatt won all four complete games and struck out 49, while allowing 6 hits and 8 walks for a 0.52 WHIP. The winning streak was broken by the Oklahoma Sooners at the Super Regionals on May 23. For this streak, Mowatt tossed 56.0 innings, allowing 22 hits, 10 walks and 2 earned runs for a 0.25 ERA and 0.57 WHIP, while fanning 91 batters. The next day the Wildcat became the eighth pitcher at the school to win 100 games.

After an appearance at 2008 WCWS, Mowatt ended her career with 1,267 strikeouts, still second best for the Wildcats, 6th in the now-named Pac-12 and within the top 30 for NCAA Division I all-time rankings; her strikeout ratio of 10.1 is still second, fifth and 21st all-time respectively.

== Professional career ==
Mowatt was drafted in the first round of the National Pro Fastpitch and picked 6th overall by the defunct Washington Glory.

Mowatt made her professional debut with the club on June 11, 2008, against the Akron Racers. She pitched 2 innings in relief in a 7-2 win by the Glory. She recorded her 1st career win on July 27 against the Philadelphia Force, pitching a complete game and allowing 3 hits, 1 run, 3 walks, and striking out 7 batters.

The Washington Glory made it to the Cowles Cup Championship but lost to the Chicago Bandits on August 24, 2008. Mowatt did not pitch.

== Career statistics ==
Arizona Wildcats
YEAR	W	L	GP	GS	CG	Sh	SV	IP	H	R	ER	BB	SO	ERA	WHIP
2005	8	1	13	10	4	3	0	58.1	42	19	15	15	82	1.80	0.98
2006	21	5	27	23	20	9	0	163.2	89	35	30	26	250	1.28	0.70
2007	42	12	60	53	50	19	3	370.0	205	90	77	168	522	1.45	1.01
2008	29	15	47	40	35	9	1	285.2	182	82	71	120	413	1.74	1.06
TOTALS	100	33	147	126	109	40	4	877.2	518	226	193	329	1267	1.54	0.96

NPF
YEAR	W	L	GP	GS	CG	Sh	SV	IP	H	R	ER	BB	SO	ERA	WHIP
2008	5	4	16	9	5	1	0	67.2	33	17	14	38	62	1.49	1.05
2010	2	3	15	7	1	0	1	42.0	46	44	41	53	26	6.24	2.35
2011	0	2	8	4	0	0	0	14.0	13	13	8	16	7	4.00	2.07
TOTAL	7	9	39	20	6	1	1	123.2	92	74	63	107	95	3.58	1.61

== See also ==
- NCAA Division I softball career strikeouts list
- NCAA Division I softball career wins list
