= Angela O'Brien =

Angela O'Brien may refer to:

- Angela Maxine O'Brien, known professionally as Margaret O'Brien, American actress
- Angela Tincher O'Brien, American softball pitcher and coach
