= Cat Osterman =

American softball player (born 1983)

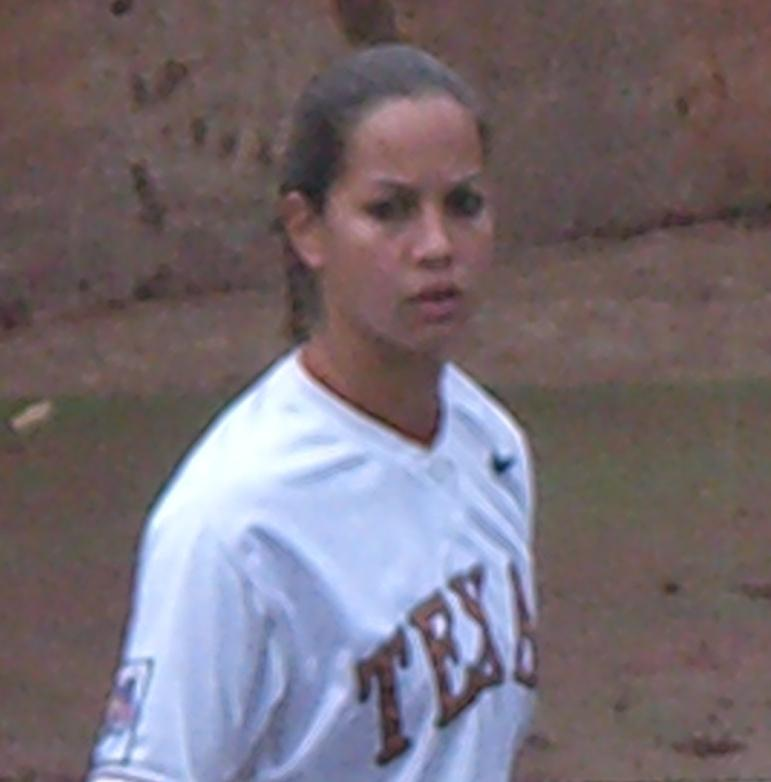
- Osterman in 2006

USSSA Pride – No. 38
- Pitcher
- Born: April 16, 1983 (age 43); Houston, Texas, U.S.
- Batted: Left Threw: Left

NPF debut
- May 29, 2007, for the Rockford Thunder

Last NPF appearance
- August 17, 2015, for the USSSA Pride

NPF statistics
- Win–loss record: 95–24
- Earned run average: 0.91
- Strikeouts: 1,260
- Saves: 12

Teams
- Rockford Thunder (2007–2009); USSSA Pride (2010–2015)

Career highlights and awards
- 3x USA Softball Collegiate Player of the Year (2003, 2005, 2006); 2× Honda Sports Award (2005, 2006); 4× Big 12 Pitcher of the Year (2002, 2003, 2005, 2006); 4× NPF Champion (2009, 2010, 2013, 2014); 6× All-NPF (2009, 2011–2015); 2x NPF Pitcher of the Year (2013, 2014); 2009 NPF Championship Series MVP; USSSA Pride No. 8 retired
Medals
Women's softball
Representing United States
Olympic Games
Gold medal – first place	2004 Athens	Team competition
Silver medal – second place	2008 Beijing	Team competition
Silver medal – second place	2020 Tokyo	Team competition

Catherine Leigh Osterman (born April 16, 1983) is an American former softball player and currently the general manager for the Texas Volts of the Athletes Unlimited Softball League (AUSL). Osterman pitched on the United States women's national softball team that won the gold medal at the 2004 Summer Olympics and silver medal at the 2008 and 2020 Summer Olympics.

She was a collegiate four-time All-American and six-time professional All-Star. She completed her college eligibility in 2006 at the University of Texas at Austin, where she was a starting pitcher for the Longhorns since 2002. Osterman holds the Big 12 Conference pitching Triple Crown for her career wins, ERA, and strikeouts, as well as shutouts, no-hitters, WHIP, and perfect games; she also holds the NCAA Division I record for strikeout ratio (14.34).

In the National Pro Fastpitch, Osterman was drafted first overall and is the career leader in strikeout ratio (10.90) and no-hitters (6). She is also one of NCAA's five pitchers to strikeout 1,000 batters with 100 wins, an ERA of under 1.00, and averaging double digit strikeouts. She was a member of the independent "This Is Us" team. In May 2020, she joined and eventually won the inaugural championship in the Athletes Unlimited Softball league as the top individual points leader. Osterman was also named No. 3 Greatest College Softball Player and the No. 1 pitcher in NCAA history.

== Early life ==
Osterman was born in Houston, Texas to parents Gary and Laura Osterman. Her younger brothers are Craig and Chris.

Osterman started playing softball in first grade, before quitting to play soccer and basketball. Osterman found her way back to the diamond in fifth grade, when she was filling in as a backup pitcher for a little league team. She attended Cypress Springs High School in Cypress, Texas from 1997 to 2001, where she set several records on the school's softball team.

In 2001, she struck out 33 batters in a 14-inning 1–0 shutout over Cy-Fair High School. The performance ranked 16th on the list of strikeouts in a single game. As such, she set a national record for strikeouts in a game less than 20 innings, beating Jenny Stallard's previous record of 31 in 19 innings in 1988; she also set a national record for strikeouts in a 14-inning game, breaking Michele Granger's former record of 31 in 1985.

== University of Texas ==
=== 2002: Freshman year ===
Osterman was named a National Fastpitch Coaches' Association Second Team All-American. She was also named Big 12 Conference First Team, Big 12 Freshman of the Year and Big 12 Pitcher of the Year. She broke and set UT single-season records for wins (led the NCAA), innings pitched, games started, shutouts, strikeouts, strikeout ratio (led the NCAA) and appearances. Currently only her inning pitched and games started remain top season records from this year. Her freshman ERA was and is a top-5 school record. Osterman also set the UT single-game record for innings-pitched (14) and single game strikeouts. She also tied the UT single-season record for complete games.

Osterman debuted on February 6, tossing six shutout innings, allowing two hits and fanning 11 of the Texas A&M–Corpus Christi Islanders. In a March 20 no-decision against the Texas State Bobcats, she struck out 24 in over 10-innings for a career best. That game also was and is a top-5 NCAA record for combined strikeouts at 34, which she shares with Nicole Neuerburg and tied Osterman fourth for an individual pitcher's total in a single game all-time.

Osterman became the first UT freshman to be named Big 12 Conference Pitcher of the Week, for the week of February 19, in which she threw two no-hitters. The first, a 3–0 win over the Utah Utes on February 13 and then a 4–0 win over the Texas State Bobcats on February 15. They were only the third and fourth no-hitters by a UT freshman, and Osterman became only the second Longhorn pitcher to accomplish the feat, along with Natalie King in 2001. She also threw the first perfect game in UT history in a game against Stephen F. Austin State Lumberjacks on February 26. She proceeded to throw two more in her freshman season to match and set two all-time NCAA Freshman Class records for season no-hitters (5) and perfect games (3), the latter record has since been surpassed.

=== 2003: Sophomore year ===
Osterman repeated honors as an All-American, now a First Team selection, as well as Big 12 "Pitcher" and "Female Athlete" of The Year. She also earned her first USA Softball Collegiate Player of the Year award. Osterman threw 4 no-hitters and a perfect game, while breaking her own UT records for ERA, shutouts and strikeout ratio (all-time NCAA Sophomore Class record), of which she also led the NCAA in, except shutouts; the strikeout ratio was a new NCAA season record. She also tied her own shared record for complete games and posted career records in wins (68), shutouts (35), strikeouts (1,042), and opponents-batting-average (.105).

From April 22 – May 22, she pitched a career high and UT record 65 consecutive scoreless innings. The streak began with a win against the Texas A&M Aggies and was broken in a 3–2 win over the ULL Ragin' Cajuns; the streak ran over 12 games (7 complete) and 11 wins and included 115 strikeouts, 16 hits and 9 walks. Osterman is so far the second pitcher in NCAA history to strike out 1,000 batters in only two seasons and in that very same game on May 22, during the Women's College World Series vs. the ULL Ragin' Cajuns, she struck out 11 to reach the milestone. Osterman also is noted for just needing over 500 innings pitched to get into the club, the fewest of any NCAA Division I pitcher.

With that win, Osterman and the Longhorns the next day advanced to meet the California Golden Bears, whom Osterman shutout with 17 strikeouts to tie Lisa Ishikawa's WCWS record for a single game performance. In a doubleheader on the 25, the Longhorns lost to the UCLA Bruins in back-to-back games and were eliminated. Osterman was named to the All-Tournament Team for her efforts.

== 2004: XXVIII Olympiad ==
Osterman redshirted from UT to participate with fellow college softball pitcher Jennie Finch in the Olympic Games in Athens.

=== Aiming for Athens ===
Osterman went undefeated in 24 appearances during the USA Softball National Team's 53-game schedule. On February 20, she struck out 9 batters in four perfect innings and combined with Finch for a no-hitter. On May 17, she struck out 7 of 9 batters over three innings, after which Finch struck out the final six batters in a row to combine for a perfect game and defeat the Sonic Stars, 10–0. On July 10, she struck out 13 batters over 5-innings for another no-hitter, this time missing perfection on a lone error by first-baseman Stacey Nuveman in a 16–0 win over the Fort Worth All-Stars.

=== Olympic Games ===
Osterman picked up two wins and a save in the Olympiad. She followed Finch and Lori Harrigan of the University of Nevada, Las Vegas by striking out the final two batters in Team USA's 7–0 victory over Italy on August 14; she gave up one hit and struck out 11 batters over 8-innings in Team USA's 3–0 victory over Japan on August 16; and she gave up one hit and four walks while striking out 10 batters over 6-innings in Team USA's 3–0 victory over Chinese Taipei on August 20. Her 23 strikeouts led Team USA.

== Return to the University of Texas ==
=== 2005: Junior year ===
Osterman received her second First Team All-American citation and repeated honors from the Big 12 and USA Softball. She also added the Honda Sports Award for softball that year as well. Osterman was named the 2005 Sportswoman of the Year (in the team category) by the Women's Sports Foundation. She also topped her previous UT single-season records for ERA (career best), strikeouts, strikeout ratio (all-time NCAA Junior Class record), shutouts, opponents batting average and complete games. The opponents BA remains the school record and Osterman again led the NCAA in ERA and strikeout ratio in addition; the ratio was another new all-time record. Finally, she set Big 12 records in ERA, strikeouts and opponents batting average, of which only the strikeouts has been surpassed. She finished the season at third place on the all-time NCAA single-season strikeout list.

Osterman threw 6 no-hitters (an NCAA top-5 season record) and three more perfect games (another NCAA top-3 and Junior Class season tying record) while setting a career best WHIP. Osterman was and is still the only pitcher to have two three perfect game seasons, including 2002. On February 27, Osterman combined with Anjelica Selden of the UCLA Bruins to strike out 31 batters in an 8-inning win for the Longhorns. She also struck out 20 or more batters in four separate games, one of which came on March 17 vs. the No. 1 Arizona Wildcats; Osterman struck out 23 in a 10-inning shutout. The game tied her combination strikeouts record of 34, this time with Alicia Hollowell.

Beginning on March 4, the Longhorn posted a career best 24.2 consecutive hitless innings when she surrendered a first-inning hit to the Evansville Purple Aces to open a three-game series before shutting them down for the rest of the game. The next day, Osterman threw the final 1.2 innings by striking out all batters faced in an eventual win for the Aces. On March 9, Osterman struck out her 1,200th batter to tie Lisa Ishikawa of Northwestern University for 10th place on the NCAA all-time strikeout list; the victory was also her sixth career perfect game. On March 11, she moved past Ishikawa and passed Jocelyn Forest of the University of California, Berkeley to take ninth place with a second consecutive no-hitter against the UTEP Miners. Finally, on March 14, Osterman came on in relief vs. the UCLA Bruins and retired the first five batters before the streak ended with a sixth-inning leadoff single. Overall, Osterman allowed only two walks and struck out 64 batters in four wins over 5 games during the streak.

On March 15, she reached 1,229 to surpass Amanda Renfro of Texas Tech for eighth place; on March 17, she passed Shawn Andaya of Texas A&M to take seventh place. On March 23, she struck out her 1,291st batter, passing Sarah Dawson of the University of Louisiana at Monroe for sixth place. On March 25, Osterman became the sixth NCAA Division I pitcher to strikeout 1,300 batters. On April 6, she passed Danielle Henderson for fifth place on the NCAA all-time strikeout list; on April 10, she struck out 7 in 3.1 innings to surpass Britni Sneed for fourth place. On April 13, she passed Nicole Myers to take third place; on April 16, she struck out 13 in a 3–2 win over the University of Missouri to become the third member of the 1,400-strikeout club (along with Michele Granger and Courtney Blades). Later she would again whiff 24 to match her own school record vs. the Texas Tech Red Raiders and along with Erin Crawford combined for another 31 strikeouts on April 26. On May 12, she crested the 1,500-strikeout plateau; on June 3, she broke the 1,600-strikeout mark.

On June 2, Osterman opened her WCWS by matching her shared record with 17 strikeouts vs. the Alabama Crimson Tide. The team eventually lost to the UCLA Bruins on June 5, who in turn lost to the eventual champions the Michigan Wolverines, to whom the Longhorns had also lost to earlier in the tournament. Osterman and Alicia Hollowell set a new WCWS record for combined strikeouts at 30 in their 11-inning battle; Osterman was named All-Tournament.

=== 2006: Senior year ===
Osterman earned honors for a final time from the NFCA, Big 12 and USA softball. Again Osterman also collected her second Honda Award. She broke and set her final set of Longhorn records in wins, strikeouts, shutouts and strikeout ratio (all-time NCAA Senior Class record), all were career highs. Osterman became one of the first pitchers to have three 500-strikeout seasons to her credit. For a fourth time in her career, Osterman led the NCAA in ERA and strikeout ratio, setting a new all-time season record in the latter category at 15.4. These would help her to a Big 12 pitching Triple Crown for the best in wins, ERA and strikeouts for that year.

Osterman pitched 5 no-hitters (NCAA top-5 season record) and opened the season with six consecutive shutouts, including an opening day no-hitter and a 16–0 romp over the Oklahoma Christian Lady Eagles. On February 11 she won her 100th career game, 3–0, against the Northwestern Wildcats in shutout fashion. On February 16, she struck out 13 Oklahoma Christian Lady Eagles batters to bring her career total to 1,708, making her just the second pitcher in NCAA history to reach the 1,700 plateau. Later she also struck out 20 batters in a 7-inning, 5–1 win over the UTSA Roadrunners on February 21 (the Senior Class record for a regulation game), which is tied second most in NCAA history and her career best at Texas for a regulation game.

On February 25, Osterman struck out 6 Fresno State Bulldogs batters in a 7–2 win and then proceeded to strike out 7 batters in a 4–0 victory over the UNLV Rebels, bringing her career strikeout total to 1,774 to surpass Courtney Blades as the all-time NCAA Division I leader. The next day, Osterman defeated the No. 1 Arizona Wildcats in an 18-strikeout, three-hit shutout to hand them their first loss. On March 1, she struck out 15 batters in a 5–1 win over the UTA Mavericks to bring her career total to 1,807, making her the first pitcher in NCAA Division I history to reach the 1,800 watershed.

Osterman recorded her 109th career win over the UTA Mavericks to tie Jessica Sallinger for 16th on the NCAA all-time career wins. On March 3, she recorded her 110th career win over Ole Miss Rebels to pass Salinger and tie Jenny Voss for 15th place; the next day, she recorded her 111th career win over the Houston Cougars to pass Voss and tie Samantha Iuli at 14th place. In a win over the Washington Huskies on March 16, Osterman combined with Danielle Lawrie for 32 strikeouts in regulation, then the highest combined total in the NCAA for a single 7-inning game.

On March 17, Osterman struck out 13 Michigan Wolverines batters in her first loss of the season (following 17 consecutive wins) to become the first pitcher in NCAA Division I history to enter the 1,900 Strikeout Club. On March 19, she threw her second win (third of her career) over the No. 1 Arizona Wildcats in 9-innings, allowing a hit and whiffing 19. On April 5, she struck out 5 Texas A&M Aggies batters to become the first pitcher to enter the 2,000 Strikeout Club; her milestone strikeout was against leadoff third-baseman Jamie Hinshaw. On April 29, Osterman struck out 16 Oklahoma State Cowgirls batters to become the first pitcher to enter the 2,100 Strikeout Club; on May 26, she struck out 16 Washington Huskies to become the first pitcher to enter the 2,200 Strikeout Club.

On March 16, Osterman recorded her 114th career win to tie Shawn Andaya for 13th place on the NCAA all-time list. On March 18, Osterman recorded her 115th career win over Notre Dame Fighting Irish to pass Andaya and tie Jennifer Stewart and Shelley Laird for 12th place; the next day, she recorded her 116th career win over the Arizona Wildcats to pass the two and tie Kristin Schmidt and Debby Day for 11th place.

On March 22, Osterman recorded her 118th career win—over the Georgia Tech Yellow Jackets—to tie Jamie Southern for 10th place on the NCAA all-time list. On March 25, she recorded her 119th career win over the Nebraska Cornhuskers to pass Southern and tie Jennie Finch, Brooke Mitchell and Michele Granger for ninth place. On March 29, Osterman recorded her 120th career win to pass them and tie Britni Sneed and Sarah Dawson for eighth place on the all-time list.

On April 14 and April 15, Osterman recorded her 124th and 125th career wins over the Oklahoma Sooners to tie and then pass Nancy Evans for sixth place on the all-time list. On April 29 and April 30, she recorded her 129th and 130th career win over the Oklahoma State Cowgirls to tie UCLA Bruins pitcher Keira Goerl for fifth place on the all-time list.

On June 1, Osterman recorded her 136th and final NCAA career win, finishing in sixth place on the all-time list. In the win, Osterman struck out 18 Arizona State Sun Devils to set a new WCWS 7-inning game record; she also brought her season total to 608, passing Monica Abbott's 2005 strikeout total for second place on the single-season strikeouts list, 33 behind Courtney Blades's all-time record. The win was also her 85th NCAA career shutout, putting her in second place behind Michele Granger's career record 94 shutouts. Osterman's NCAA career hopes for a World Series championship ended on June 3; following a 2–0 loss to the Arizona Wildcats on June 2, she lost her second game in a row, 2–0 again, to the Bruins (who had ended the Longhorns run for a championship in 2003 and 2005).

Osterman ended her career with school records in wins, strikeouts, ERA, WHIP, innings pitched, shutouts, strikeout ratio and opponents batting average. She continues to hold the crown for all categories. Osterman claims the Big 12 records for all the same categories minus the innings pitched and opponents batting average. Finally, she owns the ratio record for the NCAA Division I and is top-10 in wins (6th), strikeouts (2nd), shutouts (3rd), WHIP (2nd), perfect games (2nd) and no-hitters (3rd).

== Post-collegiate career ==
On July 2, 2006, Osterman threw a 12–0 no-hitter against the Arizona Heat in the USA Softball Exhibition, missing the perfect game by walking Kaleo Eldridge. She struck out 12 Heat batters, catching every batter at least once.

On July 17, 2006, Osterman won the championship game of the 2006 World Cup by beating Team Japan 5-2, giving up two runs on two hits and a walk while striking out 11 batters. She recorded two wins in the tournament, striking out 21 batters in 14-innings of work over three games (including two complete games, and a 9–0 shutout against Team Australia).

On August 28, Osterman made her television broadcast debut when she was the color commentator for ESPN2's broadcast of the National Pro Fastpitch championship and all-star games.

In 2007, Osterman appeared sparingly on ESPNU broadcasts as a color commentator for certain college softball games, including the game in which Monica Abbott surpassed her own career strikeout record.

== Professional career ==
On February 15, 2006, Osterman was the first overall pick in the National Pro Fastpitch (NPF) softball league draft. She was chosen by the Connecticut Brakettes. The Brakettes were formerly known as the Stratford Brakettes of the Amateur Softball Association. However, even though Osterman had been on their amateur roster for the five seasons prior to being drafted, she chose not to sign with them, making her officially a free agent on September 30. On December 19, 2006, the Rockford Thunder of the NPF announced that they signed Osterman to a contract for the 2007 season. Per team policy, terms of the deal were not disclosed.

On May 29, 2007, Osterman pitched her professional debut, striking out 24 batters in a 12-inning, 1–0, win over the Chicago Bandits, which tied the league single game strikeout record. Opposing pitcher Jennie Finch struck out 17 to combine for another NPF record 41 strikeouts. In June 2007, Osterman went 3–2 with four complete games, striking out 69 batters in 36.2 innings, while giving up 5 runs on 16 hits and 8 walks. In July, Osterman took a leave from the Thunder to travel with the US National Team, returning to the NPF following the Women's Pan-Am Games. In August, Osterman went 1–4 with two complete games, striking out 57 batters in 33.2 innings, while giving up 10 runs on 14 hits and 21 walks.

In her rookie professional season, Osterman struck out 126 batters while walking 29, and surrendered 15 runs (12 earned) on 30 hits. She set a then league record with career best strikeout ratio of 12.5. She also had her first career no-hitter on August 26, 2007, over the New England Riptide, which got her team into the Cowles Cup Championship.

In 2009, Osterman set career bests in ERA and WHIP and from June 6-August 9 she had a career best shutout streak of at least 55 innings that was snapped by the USSSA Pride in a 7-0 loss. She accomplished a no-hitter on June 13 over the Akron Racers. She won the Cowles Cup Championship in shutout fashion on August 23, 2009. She was named an All-Star and MVP for her efforts.

After announcing her retirement, Osterman went on to have arguably her best season ever. She won the pitching Triple Crown (only the second pitcher ever to accomplish the feat) and simultaneously set then season records in both the wins and strikeouts categories. The pitcher also was named All-NPF and tossed two no-hitters, the first coming on June 11, 2013 where she struck out 14, giving up only three walks. On June 27, she tied another single game record by punching out 18 batters in a 7-inning 3-0 win also against the NY/NJ Comets.

Osterman pitched her team through to the Cowles Cup Championship on August 24, 2013. She got the save in the finale and threw a shutout and two wins en route to the title and an MVP award. The victories would start a career best win streak that would stretch into her final season.

For the 2014 season, Osterman was named Pitcher of the Year, earned her second consecutive pitching Triple Crown with a perfect season, extending her win streak to 18 straight games. On August 23 The Pride won the Cowles Cup championship, and she helped throwing two shutout wins resulting in back-to-back MVP awards on August 23. She also threw her fifth career no-hitter on July 5.

Osterman opened the 2015 season with three wins for 21 consecutive victories dating back to 2013, a career highlight. The Akron Racers broke through on June 22 with a 2-0 decision. For the streak, Osterman completed 149.0 innings and surrendered 63 hits, 11 earned runs and 40 walks while fanning 237 hitters for a 0.51 ERA and 0.69 WHIP. On July 10, 2015, Osterman pitched the sixth no-hitter of her NPF career, beating the Pennsylvania Rebellion 2-1.

On June 8, 2017, the Pride announced that Osterman's jersey number 8 had been retired, commemorating it with a banner on the outfield fence. Osterman currently is tops in career strikeout ratio and no-hitters, while ranking second in ERA and strikeouts overall; the first pitcher to reach 1,000 career strikeouts.

== US National Team ==
On July 11, Osterman threw a no-hitter in the 2003 Canada Cup, striking out 10 batters to defeat Team Canada, 8–0; on July 12, Osterman pitched her second no-hitter of the 2003 Canada Cup, striking out 16 of 24 batters to defeat the Stratford Brakettes, 5–0.

On August 15, Osterman threw a perfect game to win the Gold-Medal game of the 2003 Pan American Games against Canada 4–0, securing Team USA's fifth consecutive PanAm Gold Medal. She struck out 14 batters in a game that was delayed three-and-a-half hours due to rain.

On June 12, Osterman picked up the win in Team USA's Gold-Medal 9–0 victory over Australia in the 2005 International Sports Invitational; she gave up one hit and struck out ten batters over five innings.

Osterman continued to pitch for USA Softball Women's National team in 2007. In the Canada's Cup, she struck out 18 batters in 8-innings over four games from July 1–7 and gave up 1 run on three hits and four walks. In the World Cup, she struck out 21 batters in two complete game wins on July 13 and July 16, giving up four hits, two walks, and no runs.

In the Women's Pan-Am Games, Osterman threw a 5-inning no-hitter against Cuba on July 26, giving up just one walk and striking out 15. In the Japan Cup, she struck out 20 batters in 9-innings over three games from November 16–18, giving up three hits, one walk, and one unearned run.

== 2008: XXIX Olympiad ==
=== Bound 4 Beijing ===
Osterman went undefeated in 28 appearances during the USA Softball National Team's 60-game tour, contributing 15 wins to Team USA's 59–1 record. She struck out 247 batters in 116.2 innings, giving up 9 runs on 37 hits and 18 walks, and throwing 9 complete games.

On February 22, she struck out 7 batters in three perfect innings and combined with Abbott and Finch for a 9–0 no-hitter against the Palm Springs All-Stars. The next afternoon, she struck out 5 batters in two perfect innings to close out another 9–0 combined no-hitter with Finch against Florida Atlantic University, the first of two combined no-hitters for Team USA in the February 23 double-header.

On the 24th, Osterman struck out 7 batters in the final three innings of a combined perfect game; Abbott struck out 7 in the opening three innings of a 15–0 rout of Hawaii. On May 16, Osterman struck out 14 batters in a complete-game 13–0 no-hit victory over the Visalia All-Stars, missing the perfect game by hitting Lindsey Herrin with a pitch.

On July 10, Osterman struck out 22 batters in 9.1-innings, leading Team USA to a 31–0 victory over the Spokane All-Stars. She struck out 10 or more batters 11 times during the tour, and topped 15 strikeouts four times.

=== Olympic Games ===
On August 13, Osterman struck out 13 batters in a no-hitter against the Australian national team. She issued three walks in the 3–0 victory, which was Team USA's 16th consecutive Olympic win. The 7-inning no-hitter was just the second in U.S. Olympic history, following Lori Harrigan's 6–0 perfect game against Canada on September 17, 2000, and was Osterman's 100th game-played with the U.S. Women's National Team.

On August 15, following Team USA's 7–0 victory over Japan, Osterman pitched the final 4-innings of the suspended match against Canada, postponed from the previous day due to rain and lightning. Osterman struck out 8 batters and allowed one hit, enabling the line-up to mount a comeback for an 8–1 win, Team's USA's 18th consecutive victory and Osterman's second of the 2008 Games.

On August 18, Osterman pitched the first three innings of a 5-inning 9–0 win over China, giving up a hit, a walk, and hitting a batter, while striking out three. Osterman's third win of the tournament was Team USA's 21st consecutive Olympic victory.

On August 20, Osterman earned a save—her first for Team USA since the Athens Olympics—in a 9-inning 4–1 win over Japan. She inherited a runner from Abbott before retiring three batters for a perfect ninth to preserve the victory and advance to the Gold Medal Match, where Team USA faced Japan once again following Japan's 12-inning 4–3 win over Australia in the Bronze Medal Match.

On August 21, Osterman pitched the first 5 innings of a 3–1 loss to Japan in the Gold Medal Match, ending Team USA's winning streak at 22 consecutive games and clinching the silver medal of the 2008 Summer Games. The loss was Team USA's first since a 2–1 loss to Australia on 21 September 2000, and marks the first time in four Olympiads that the US National Team has failed to win the gold. Osterman gave up two runs on three hits while striking out 9 batters; the runs and the loss was the first in her Olympic career.

== Return for the 2020 Summer Olympics ==
Osterman retired after the 2008 games. In 2018, she announced that should would be un-retiring once softball was reintroduced for the 2020 games. Osterman made the team for the 2019 season. She helped Team USA win a silver medal at the 2020 Summer Olympics. Osterman did not allow a run in 14 innings of work and won two games for Team USA. She started the gold medal game against Team Japan but eventually the team was defeated in a 2–0 loss on July 27, 2021.

== Athletes Unlimited ==
In November 2024, Athletes Unlimited hired Osterman as the general manager for team Volts in their inaugural season of the Athletes Unlimited Softball League (AUSL).

== Miscellaneous ==
Among her favorite athletes are fellow Texans Roger Clemens and Nolan Ryan, as well as NBA player Hakeem Olajuwon and actor/ director Kevin Costner. She was the first softball player to appear on the cover of Sports Illustrated (the October 7, 2002 "America's Best Sports Colleges" issue), and made a second SI cover with the 2004 Olympic Gold Medal Softball team to become one of two softball players to appear on the cover of Sports Illustrated twice.

In the bonus features of the "Bad News Bears" DVD, Billy Bob Thornton admits to having a crush on Cat Osterman.

Osterman is a spokesperson for Under Armour as well as having an endorsement contract and signature glove with Wilson.

In 2009, Osterman posed nude along with three of her Olympic teammates for the first annual The Body Issue of ESPN The Magazine. Of the shoot, Osterman said that it was a "surprisingly emotional experience" and that "even though I was terrified on set at first, I'm glad I did it. Sometimes it's necessary to push yourself to see what you are made of."

In 2012, Osterman was inducted into the Texas Sports Hall of Fame.

In 2014, Osterman signed on as an assistant softball coach at Texas State University.

In 2016, Osterman was inducted into the Little League Hall of Excellence.

== Career statistics ==
Cy-Fair Slammers
YEAR	W	L	GP	GS	CG	Sh	SV	IP	H	R	ER	BB	SO	ERA
1998	4	0	—	—	—	3	—	14.0	2	1	—	—	22	—

Katy Streamliners
YEAR	W	L	GP	GS	CG	Sh	SV	IP	H	R	ER	BB	SO	ERA
1998	6	1	—	—	—	—	—	—	—	—	—	—	—	—

Cypress Springs High School
YEAR	W	L	GP	GS	CG	Sh	SV	IP	H	R	ER	BB	SO	ERA
1999	—	—	—	—	—	—	—	146.0	—	—	—	—	312	—
2000	—	—	—	—	—	—	—	176.0	—	—	—	—	394	—
2001	20	4	—	—	—	20	—	184.0	18	9	0	3	451	0.00
TOTALS	—	—	—	—	—	—	—	507.0	—	—	7	22	1158	—

Katy Cruisers
YEAR	W	L	GP	GS	CG	Sh	SV	IP	H	R	ER	BB	SO	ERA
1999	20	5	—	—	—	—	—	182	—	—	2	—	299	=
2000	—	—	—	—	—	—	—	47	—	—	—	—	106	—

Connecticut Brakettes
YEAR	W	L	GP	GS	CG	Sh	SV	IP	H	R	ER	BB	SO	ERA	WHIP
2001	4	1	6	—	4	—	0	30.0	10	1	0	4	52	0.00	0.46
2002	6	0	6	—	6	—	0	38.0	8	3	3	1	85	0.55	0.23
TOTALS	10	1	12	—	10	—	0	68.0	18	4	3	5	137	0.31	0.34

Team USA
YEAR	W	L	GP	GS	CG	SHO	SV	IP	H	R	ER	BB	SO	ERA	WHIP
2001	7	2	14	8	5	5	2	68.2	33	13	7	20	111	0.71	0.77
2003	6	0	9	6	6	6	1	51.2	10	2	2	7	99	0.27	0.33
2004	16	0	24	15	3	3	0	74.2	16	1	0	7	170	0.00	0.31
Olympics	2	0	3	2	1	2	1	14.2	2	0	0	5	23	0.00	0.49
2005	2	1	3	3	2	1	0	19.0	1	3	2	3	32	0.74	0.21
2006	3	0	8	3	3	2	0	27.0	7	3	2	7	43	0.52	0.52
2007	5	0	10	4	3	5	0	34.0	10	2	1	8	74	0.21	0.53
2008	15	0	28	16	9	14	0	116.1	37	9	7	18	247	0.42	0.47
Olympics	3	1	5	3	1	2	1	19.2	5	2	2	4	33	0.71	0.47
2020	4	0	7	6	1	1	0	20.2	5	2	2	3	46	0.69	0.39
2021	9	1	14	11	1	1	0	58.0	29	9	8	15	97	0.96	0.76
Olympics	2	0	4	3	0	0	0	14.2	4	0	0	2	15	0.00	0.42
TOTALS	74	5	129	80	35	42	5	519.0	159	46	33	99	1030	0.44	0.49

Texas Longhorns
YEAR	W	L	GP	GS	CG	SHO	SV	IP	H	R	ER	BB	SO	ERA	WHIP
2002	36	8	51	40	27	17	3	304.1	130	43	36	62	554	0.83	0.63
2003	32	6	40	36	27	18	0	242.2	72	18	13	39	488	0.37	0.46
2005	30	7	42	33	31	22	0	272.2	68	23	14	48	593	0.36	0.42
2006	38	4	47	39	36	28	2	286.0	78	19	17	43	630	0.41	0.42
TOTALS	136	25	180	148	121	85	5	1105.2	348	103	80	192	2265	0.50	0.49

NPF
YEAR	W	L	GP	GS	CG	SHO	SV	IP	H	R	ER	BB	SO	ERA	WHIP
2007	4	6	12	10	6	2	0	70.1	30	15	12	29	126	1.20	0.84
2009	11	1	16	11	10	9	2	84.1	37	5	5	16	148	0.41	0.63
2010	4	1	10	5	3	1	4	39.0	19	8	7	6	54	1.25	0.64
2011	15	2	18	14	11	4	0	102.0	51	25	16	33	166	1.10	0.82
2012	10	6	21	15	12	5	2	106.0	57	23	17	29	148	1.12	0.81
2013	19	4	25	21	17	9	2	155.0	77	26	21	53	255	0.94	0.84
2014	16	0	20	17	10	7	1	113.0	48	9	8	30	180	0.49	0.69
2015	16	4	20	22	13	1	1	139.2	62	25	20	29	183	1.00	0.65
TOTAL	95	24	142	115	82	38	12	809.1	381	136	106	225	1260	0.91	0.75

Athletes Unlimited Softball
YEAR	W	L	GP	GS	CG	SHO	SV	IP	H	R	ER	BB	SO	ERA	WHIP
2020	13	1	11	9	6	2	0	64.0	37	15	14	18	95	1.53	0.86
2021	4	4	12	7	2	1	1	60.0	31	23	15	26	50	1.75	0.95
TOTAL	17	5	23	16	8	3	1	124.0	68	38	29	44	145	1.63	0.90

== Career records ==
- 2,265 career NCAA Division I strikeouts (2nd all-time)
- 14.34 NCAA strikeouts per 7 innings (1st all-time)
- 3-time USA Softball Collegiate Player of the Year (2003, 2005, 2006) (1st all-time)
- 136 career NCAA Division I wins (6th all-time)
- 0.50 ERA NCAA NCAA Division I sub-1.00 ERAs
- 85 career NCAA Division I shutouts (third all-time)
- 25 career Big 12 Pitcher of the Week awards (1st all-time)
- 20 career NCAA Division I no-hitters (third all-time)
- 7 career NCAA Division I perfect games (2nd all-time)
- 4-time Big 12 Pitcher of the Year (T-1st all-time)
