= Courtney Blades =

American softball player and coach

Southern Miss Golden Eagles – No. 5
- Pitcher
- Born: May 16, 1978 (age 48); Baton Rouge, Louisiana, U.S.
- Bats: Right Throws: Right

Teams
- Nicholls State Colonels (1997–1998); Southern Miss Golden Eagles (1999–2000)

Career highlights and awards
- Southland Player of the Year (1998); Southland Pitcher of the Year (1998); 2× WCWS All-Tournament Team (1999–2000); 2× First Team All-American (1999–2000); Honda Sports Award (2000)

Courtney Lynn Blades-Rogers (born May 16, 1978) is an American, former collegiate All-American, right-handed batting softball pitcher. She was a starting pitcher for two NCAA Division I teams: the Nicholls State Colonels and later the Southern Miss Golden Eagles. For her career she collected 151 wins (second most) and 1,773 strikeouts (fifth most). She was awarded the Honda Sports Award Softball Player of the Year in 2000 and was recently named the #7 Greatest NCAA Pitcher of All-Time.

== Early life and education ==
Born in Baton Rouge, Louisiana, Blades graduated from Belaire High School in Baton Rouge in 1996.

Blades began her career with the Colonels and earned the 1997 Southland Newcomer of The Year Award. She continued her excellent play to earn both Player and Pitcher of The Year in 1998. Her combined ERA (career best), strikeouts, wins, shutouts and innings pitched stats led the league, which earned her a pitching Triple Crown

At the close of 1998, Blades two-year career placed her in the top-10 for school records in batting average (.320), shutouts and ERA; her 613 strikeouts set the record.

Beginning in the 1999 season, Blades transferred to Southern Mississippi as a junior to continue working with her relocated head coach Lu Harris. She was honored with First Team All-American honors. She threw three no-hitters and a perfect game and proceeded to strike out 497 batters, setting a new NCAA season record, eclipsing Michele Granger's previous mark of 484, set in 1993. Her wins, ERA, innings and shutouts set new school records. The wins were the fourth best total ever in the NCAA as she led the nation that year.

Blades led the Golden Eagles to an appearance at the 1999 Women's College World Series. It was a first for the school program and especially notable because it was their reactivation after 7 years of hiatus.

As a senior in 2000, Blades would earn All-USA, USA Pitcher of The Year, USA MVP and a First Team All-American citation. She also picked up the Honda Sports Award for softball in 2000 as the best collegiate player that year. Blades threw 4 no-hitters and two perfect games and would win 52 in her final season, setting the NCAA Division I single season and Senior Class records. Her ERA, WHIP, innings pitched and shutouts also reset school, conference records and were career best (excluding ERA), and also placed Blades in the top-5 for inning and shutout records in an NCAA season. Along with USA conference pitching Triple Crown, her career best strikeout ratio of 11.6 led the nation.

On March 1, 2000, Blades struck out 18 batters in a 7-inning, 7-1 win against the Samford Bulldogs, her career-high for a regulation game. The performance tied her with the NCAA fourth best (third at the time) regulation game record holders. Beginning on April 15 and lasting until May 7, Blades pitched a career best 80 consecutive scoreless innings, a school and conference record and ranked top-10 for the NCAA. In one of the games on May 6 against the USF Bulls, she broke Michele Granger's previous NCAA Division I career strikeout record of 1,640 by reaching 1,643. During the NCAA Tournament to reach that year's Women's College World Series, Blades would notch her career, school and conference record best 21 strikeouts against the LSU Tigers in a 1-0, 13-inning loss on May 20, 2000 The game total was also the tournament record that held until 2004.

At the WCWS, Blades twirled her second season perfect game on May 25. It was the fourth perfect game ever pitched at the World Series. Blades fanned 11 of the No. 2 seeded, 2000 NCAA batting champs, the Arizona Wildcats, on opening day to also break the NCAA season wins record. Southern Mississippi would end the season with a third-place finish at the series and ranked 4th nationally under the command of Blades, who was selected to the WCWS All-Tournament Team.

She finished the season with a total of 663 strikeouts, becoming the first pitcher to break 500 and 600 strikeouts in a season. That mark brought her career total to 1,773, a record that would stand until February 25, 2006 when Texas Longhorns pitcher Cat Osterman passed the mark against the University of Nevada-Las Vegas. The eagle owns the school career records in just two seasons for wins (95), strikeouts (1,160), ERA (0.93), shutouts (50) and innings pitched (717.2). Blades also owned the conference USA career strikeouts crown and now ranks second all-time, while her wins, ERA and innings are all top-5 for a career. For both schools, Blades is ranked second in wins, 5th in strikeouts, 4th in innings pitched and 8th for shutouts, while being tied 5th in perfect games for an NCAA career.

== Playing career ==
Blades played with the Stratford Brakettes for one tournament in 2000. She pitched in 5 games with a 2-1 win–loss record, 37 strikeouts, 1 earned run in 24.1 innings, putting her ERA at 0.29. One of the wins Blades pitched was a perfect game with 11 K's against the Decatir Twisters.

== Coaching career ==
In 2001, Blades served as an assistant coach under Lu Harris at Georgia.

== Awards & honors ==
On November 4, 2000, Blades was inducted by the Southern Mississippi Director of Athletics Richard Giannini into the newly created Southern Miss Legends Club; other members include Reggie Collier, Brett Favre, Ray Guy, Sammy Winder, Janice Felder, Nick Revon, and Clarence Weatherspoon.

Blades was ceremoniously invited into the Southern Mississippi Golden Eagles Hall of Fame on March 31, 2006. On July 27, 2012, Blades was also inducted into the Mississippi Sports Hall of Fame.

- 1997-1998 All-Southland
- 2000 USA MVP
- 2000 USA Pitcher of the Year
- 2000 Region 7 Most Outstanding Player
- 2000 Honda Sports Award
- USA All-Decade Team (2005)

== Statistics ==
=== Nicholls State & Southern Mississippi ===
| YEAR | W | L | GP | GS | CG | SHO | SV | IP | H | R | ER | BB | SO | ERA | WHIP |
| 1997 | 27 | 14 | 48 | 42 | 27 | 13 | 2 | 288.1 | 200 | 60 | 50 | 83 | 303 | 1.21 | 0.98 |
| 1998 | 29 | 7 | 45 | 34 | 32 | 14 | 3 | 255.2 | 117 | 39 | 30 | 81 | 310 | 0.82 | 0.77 |
| 1999 | 43 | 6 | 56 | 54 | 37 | 22 | 1 | 318.0 | 141 | 61 | 45 | 103 | 497 | 0.99 | 0.76 |
| 2000 | 52 | 7 | 66 | 60 | 46 | 28 | 2 | 399.2 | 152 | 61 | 51 | 117 | 663 | 0.89 | 0.67 |
| TOTALS | 151 | 34 | 215 | 190 | 142 | 77 | 8 | 1261.2 | 610 | 221 | 176 | 384 | 1773 | 0.97 | 0.79 |

=== Athletic accomplishments ===
- 1,773 strikeouts fifth most
- 151 wins second most
- 77 shutouts (seventh most)
- 7 career NCAA Division I no-hitters
- 3 career NCAA Division I perfect games
- .320 batting average (Nicholls State Colonels)
- .307 batting average (Southern Mississippi Golden Eagles)
