= Angela Tincher O'Brien =

American softball player (born 1985)

Biographical details
- Born: December 16, 1985 (age 40); Low Moor, Virginia, U.S.

Playing career
- 2005–2008: Virginia Tech
- 2008–2010: Akron Racers
- 2009: Leopalace 21
- Position: Pitcher

Coaching career (HC unless noted)
- 2010: Syracuse (pitching)
- 2011: Maryland (pitching)
- 2012–2013: Daytona State (pitching)
- 2014–2018: Virginia Tech (pitching)

Accomplishments and honors

Awards
- Honda Sports Award softball (2008); ACC Pitcher of the Year (2006, 2007); 2× first-team Louisville Slugger/NFCA All-American (2007, 2008); Second-team Louisville Slugger/NFCA All-American (2006)

Angela Tincher O'Brien (born Angela Susan Tincher; December 16, 1985) is an American, former collegiate All-American, retired professional All-Star softball pitcher and coach. She most recently served as the pitching coach at Virginia Tech. She was a 2008 first-round draft selection for the NPF Akron Racers. She is a graduate of James River High School and a 2008 graduate of Virginia Tech. In 2013, she was hired as Virginia Tech's softball pitching coach where she owns numerous school records. She is the ACC career leader in wins, strikeouts, shutouts, innings pitched, strikeout ratio and no-hitters, while also ranking in several records for the NCAA Division I, where she is one of five pitchers to achieve 100 wins, 1,000 strikeouts, an ERA under 1.00 and average double-digit strikeouts for her career.

== Playing career ==
=== College career ===
Born Angela Susan Tincher in Low Moor, Virginia, Tincher O'Brien attended Alleghany High School in Covington for one year before moving to Eagle Rock and transferring to James River High School in nearby Buchanan.

At Virginia Tech, Tincher O'Brien was a pitcher for Virginia Tech Hokies softball from 2005 to 2008 under head coach Scot Thomas. Tincher began her career by breaking the school records for season strikeouts and strikeout ratio. In addition, she also achieved the second best opponents batting average, which now all rank top-5 all-time. Tincher made her debut on February 12, 2005, defeating the Stetson Hatters with a one-run, twelve-strikeout performance. On March 25, Tincher tossed her first career no-hitter over the Maryland Terrapins.

For her sophomore campaign, Tincher was named an NFCA Second-Team All-American, All-ACC and ACC pitcher of the year. She broke her own records for strikeouts, strikeout ratio (both were top-ten for an NCAA season) and topped the opponents batting average list; her season ERA and innings pitched ranked second in the school books and now are top-five all-time. She also threw four no-hitters that year.

On February 19, 2006, she set her first school single game record by striking out 19 in seven innings of work against the UNCG Spartans; Tincher and the Hokies won the game 3–0. The total tied her at third in strikeouts for a single regulation game in the NCAA. On March 3, Tincher struck out 26 batters in an 11-inning win over the Nevada Wolf Pack. The total was another school and career record, as well as the NCAA sophomore class record for single game strikeouts. It also tied the second-most strikeouts ever in an NCAA collegiate game, and Tincher was only the second player to match Michele Granger's 1993 record-setter. Along with Jordan McPherson, who struck out 14 Hokies, she and Tincher set an NCAA record for combined strikeouts at 40, which is now the fifth best single game total.

Tincher was named to the First Team All-American list as a junior and again repeated all-conference honors. Tincher broke and set season records for wins, ERA, WHIP, shutouts, opponents' batting average, and strikeout ratio (13.8). Of these career highs, she led the nation in ERA, and her shutouts and strikeout ratio are still top-ten season records for the NCAA. Tincher also managed to break the strikeouts (NCAA all-time junior class record) and innings pitched school records and they still remain top-five for a Virginia Tech season. Tincher would achieve an ACC Triple Crown for the best wins, ERA and strikeout totals. She also threw 5 no-hitters (an NCAA top-five season record), two of them perfect games.

Starting on February 11, Tincher pitched 45.2 consecutive scoreless innings for a career highlight. In a win over the Tennessee Tech Golden Eagles, she allowed runs in the first but shut out the team the rest of the way before throwing five complete game shutouts back-to-back. The streak ended in a win over the Illinois State Redbirds when they scored in the fifth inning. During the streak, the Hokie went 6–0 with 102 strikeouts and only giving up 9 hits and 10 base on balls for a 0.42 WHIP and strikeout ratio of 15.7. In that first matchup with the Eagles, Tincher matched her career high of 19 strikeouts in regulation, which she would match two more times that year. The fourth shutout of the streak was also her first career perfect game vs. the Lehigh Mountain Hawks. Tincher would also surpass 1,000 career strikeouts on February 28 in a shutout win vs. the Radford Highlanders. Then, on March 18, Tincher retired the final 8 batters in a win over the Georgia Tech Yellow Jackets without allowing a hit. In a matchup with the Florida State Seminoles on March 24, she threw an 8-inning perfect game to start that series and finally a day later did not allow a hit through the first six innings for a second win. The streak ran for 16.2 consecutive hitless innings, with Tincher fanning 31 and surrendering only a walk.

For a final time, Tincher was named All-American, all-conference as well as earning the ACC Player of The Year award. She was also honored as the USA Softball Collegiate Player of the Year and won the Honda Sports Award for softball. Tincher broke her own and set school season records for strikeouts and innings, as well as tying her own wins mark. For the strikeouts, Tincher become one of the only pitchers to have three 500 and just the second with two 600 strikeout seasons. She also set school second best records in ERA, strikeout ratio and shutouts, while her opponents average ranks third all-time. She led the Nation in ERA and strikeout ratio while throwing 4 no-hitters and garnering her second conference pitching Triple Crown.

Tincher also broke her own NCAA record for combined strikeouts in a loss to the Arizona Wildcats on March 1, 2008, shared with Taryne Mowatt who combined for 41 strikeouts. Beginning on March 9 against the Cal State Northridge Matadors, the Hokie posted a career best 13 consecutive game win streak ending on April 9 in a loss to the Longwood Lancers. During the streak, Tincher struck out 186, surrendering 8 earned runs in 83.1 innings pitched along with 25 hits and 23 walks for a 0.67 ERA and 0.58 WHIP. Tincher won her 100th career game in shutout fashion against the NC State Wolfpack on March 22. For one of her no-hitters, Tincher would be just the third pitcher to cross into the 2,000 career strikeouts club vs. the East Carolina Pirates on April 29. On May 25, 2008, she led the Hokies in back-to-back victories over the Michigan Wolverines to advance to their first Women's College World Series. Virginia Tech ended up being eliminated, but not before Tincher came within one of the World Series record for single-game strikeouts with 19 against the No. 1 seeded Florida Gators in her last collegiate appearance. Despite the loss, Tincher would make the WCWS All-Tournament Team.

She would also leave Virginia Tech holding the school career records for wins, shutouts, ERA, innings pitched, WHIP, strikeout ratio, opponents average, no-hitters, game, season and career strikeouts. She would also hold or tie for the ACC crown for all except ERA. Tincher ranks third behind Monica Abbott and Cat Osterman on the NCAA Division I Softball career strikeouts list. Finally, she ranks second in career strikeout ratio (13.4) and is tied sixth for no-hitters (14).

On March 26, 2008, Tincher pitched a no-hitter, striking out 10 batters in a 1–0 exhibition win over the United States Olympic softball team, ending its 185-game pre-Olympic exhibition game winning streak dating back to 1996. Tincher had a goal of becoming an Olympic softball player. It was the first loss to a true college team in USA softball's history. She was one of four pitchers on the 2006 winning ISF World University Softball Championship team, and was invited to try out but was not selected for the 2008 Olympic Team.

Tincher's accomplishments as a Hokie led to her enshrinement into the Virginia Tech Sports Hall of Fame in 2018, her first year of eligibility.

=== Professional career ===
Tincher was the third overall pick in the first round of the 2008 National Pro Fastpitch senior draft. The Akron Racers signed Tincher to a record $10 million multi-year deal; she made her professional debut on June 10, 2008, in a 7–2 loss to the Washington Glory. Tincher played 3.1 innings and had seven strikeouts to counter five hits and three home runs that scored five.

She had a rookie season high of 10 strikeouts and led the league with 157, just four short of the NPF record for a season. She also had a 12–11 record in 129.1 innings pitched on 84 hits, 46 runs and 87 walks. Tincher was also named to the 2008 All-NPF Team.

Tincher also played for the Japanese team Leopalace 21 in 2009.

== Coaching career ==
Tincher O'Brien began her coaching career as pitching coach at Syracuse in 2010, helping the team win the Big East title. In 2011, Tincher was pitching coach at Maryland and was later pitching coach for the junior college softball team of Daytona State College from 2012 to 2013.

On August 27, 2013, Tincher O'Brien returned to Virginia Tech as pitching coach under Thomas. Thomas was fired after the 2018 season, and Tincher O'Brien became interim head coach. Virginia Tech later hired Pete D'Amour as head coach, and D'Amour did not retain Tincher O'Brien on staff.

== Personal life ==
Tincher O'Brien is married to former Virginia Tech baseball player Sean O'Brien. They have two children.

== Statistics ==
Virginia Tech Hokies
| YEAR | W | L | GP | GS | CG | SHO | SV | IP | H | R | ER | BB | SO | ERA | WHIP |
| 2005 | 21 | 9 | 36 | 30 | 18 | 4 | 3 | 204.1 | 108 | 47 | 31 | 69 | 349 | 1.06 | 0.86 |
| 2006 | 26 | 9 | 45 | 33 | 28 | 10 | 3 | 256.1 | 89 | 52 | 37 | 100 | 504 | 1.01 | 0.74 |
| 2007 | 38 | 7 | 49 | 43 | 41 | 23 | 3 | 311.2 | 107 | 34 | 25 | 70 | 617 | 0.56 | 0.57 |
| 2008 | 38 | 10 | 56 | 44 | 37 | 17 | 2 | 344.0 | 130 | 46 | 31 | 75 | 679 | 0.63 | 0.59 |
| TOTALS | 123 | 35 | 186 | 150 | 124 | 54 | 11 | 1116.1 | 434 | 179 | 124 | 314 | 2149 | 0.78 | 0.67 |

NPF Akron Racers
| YEAR | W | L | G | GS | CG | Sh | SV | IP | H | R | ER | BB | SO | ERA | WHIP |
| 2008 | 12 | 11 | 28 | 21 | 9 | 0 | 1 | 131.2 | 84 | 46 | 38 | 87 | 157 | 2.02 | 1.30 |
| 2009 | 6 | 2 | 10 | 9 | 7 | 0 | 0 | 59.0 | 38 | 20 | 15 | 20 | 67 | 1.78 | 0.98 |
| TOTAL | 18 | 13 | 38 | 30 | 16 | 0 | 1 | 190.2 | 122 | 66 | 53 | 107 | 224 | 1.95 | 1.20 |

== Collegiate awards ==
- 2006 ESPN the Magazine Second-Team Academic All-American
- 2006 ACC Player and Pitcher of the Year; First-Team All-ACC
- 2006 Second-Team NFCA All-American
- 2007 ESPN the Magazine First-Team Academic All-American
- 2007 ACC Tournament MVP
- 2007 ACC Pitcher of the Year; First-team All-ACC
- 2007 First-Team NFCA All-American
- 2008 AAU Sullivan Award Finalist
- 2008 Lowe's Senior CLASS Softball Award
- 2008 ACC Tournament MVP
- 2008 ACC Pitcher of the Year; First-team All-ACC
- 2008 USA Softball Collegiate Player of the Year
- 2008 Honda Sports Award winner
- 2008 One of five finalist for the Honda-Broderick Cup
- 2008 Espy's Best Female Collegiate Athlete Nominee
