= Nicole Myers =

Nicole "Nikki" Myers (born July 31, 1980) is an American, former collegiate All-American, right-handed hitting softball pitcher originally from St. Petersburg, Florida. She played for the Florida Atlantic University Owls from 1999 to 2002. Myers is the Atlantic Sun Conference career leader in strikeouts, ERA, shutouts, WHIP, no-hitters and innings pitched. She also owns numerous school records in both offense and pitching categories and holds the career pitching Triple Crown for the Owls and is one of three NCAA Division I softball players to reach both the 1,000 strikeouts and 50 home runs clubs for a career.

== Florida Atlantic Owls ==
Born in Pottstown, Pennsylvania, Myers grew up in St. Petersburg, Florida and graduated from St. Petersburg High School in 1998.

Myers was named the 1999 FAU "Female Athlete of The Year" as well as earning her first All-Atlantic Sun citation. Her doubles, home runs (led the conference) and on-base percentage totals were all new school records and her RBIs and slugging percentage were merely second best. All those records still rank top-5 all-time for a season.

On March 16, 1999, Myers tallied her first career no-hitter against the Hartford Hawks.

As a sophomore, Myers tossed 4 no-hitters, one on March 17, 2000, where she struck out 17 batters in regulation to defeat the Rutgers Scarlet Knights for a career high. Again earning conference distinctions, Myers added "Player of The Year" honors. Myers broke school season records for strikeouts, ERA, WHIP, strikeout ratio and shutouts (another conference record); the WHIP was a career best. On the offensive side, she added 11 home runs and posted a new base on balls record.

Along with a no-hitter and identical conference honors, Myers was awarded as a 2001 Second Team All-American. She broke her own ERA, strikeouts and strikeout ratio (10.9) records. Two remain the records at FAU: the ERA (led the Atlantic Sun) and strikeout ratio (led the NCAA); along with her wins and strikeouts. Myers earned a conference pitching Triple Crown for the best ERA, wins and strikeouts totals. At the time, her wins and innings were season second best all-time for the Owls. Achieving her best batting average, RBIs and home run totals, Myers would also set the school records for slugging and on-base percentages as well as walks.

On February 23, she bested the FSU Seminoles in 10-innings, totaling 18 strikeouts that combined with Leslie Malerich for 30. On March 17, Myers hit two home runs to drive in 5 RBIs against the FAMU Rattlers for a career highlight. With a one-run loss on May 1 to the FIU Panthers, Myers began a career best 39.1 consecutive scoreless inning streak eventually ended in a Regional loss to the California Golden Bears on May 18. Myers was 4–2 with four complete games and 51 strikeouts, giving up 15 hits and 12 walks for a 0.69 WHIP. In one of the wins on May 4, Myers struck out a career, school and conference record 25 Stetson Hatters in a 1–0, 3-hit victory at the end of 15-innings. Her game total, as well as the combined total (39) with pitcher Kelli Lightner, both rank top-10 all-time respectively for an NCAA Division I single game. Myers also set a career best with four walks in the game.

Myers' senior campaign saw her toss 4 no-hitters, one a perfect game on February 24, 2002, vs. the Southern Illinois Salukis. For the third straight year, Myers earned All-Atlantic Sun and "Player of The Year" honors, along with another All-American notation. She broke and set school records with her wins (led the NCAA), shutouts, innings pitched and strikeouts, all except the innings are also conference records; along with her ERA, she would achieve a second pitching Triple Crown for the conference. Her batting average, hits, doubles, home runs, walks, slugging and on-base percentages were and still are top-5 for an FAU season.

On February 10, Myers was defeated by the Washington Huskies but did collect her 1,000th career strikeout. A one-hit shutout on February 23 vs. Southern Illinois Salukis led to a career best 13 consecutive game win streak that the Minnesota Golden Gophers snapped on March 22. April 5, Myers hit a two-run homer off Kristi Montgomerey of the Mercer Bears to nab the 50th of her career, while throwing a no-hitter and ending the game on a mercy rule RBI single. In another no-hitter, Myers won her 100th game vs. the Belmont Bruins on April 14. Myers ended her career in a team loss to the Chattanooga Mocs on May 17, she had two hits and threw 1.1 scoreless innings of relief with two strikeouts.

Myers would leave FAU as the career record holder in at least 16 categories for both hitting and pitching, of which her strikeouts, ERA, shutouts, WHIP and innings pitched survive as the school and conference standards, while 10 others rank top-10 all-time. In the conference, she also ranks top-10 in career RBIs, hits, home runs and doubles. She is tied ninth in no-hitters (10) for an NCAA career.

== NPF ==
Myers made her debut with the Akron Racers on June 1, 2004, in a loss vs. the Texas Thunder, though she did not start the game.

On August 12, Myers tossed a no-hitter against the Arizona Heat. It was the fourth that NPF season.

== Honors ==
While serving as an assistant coach for the Michigan State Spartans, Myers was ceremoniously inducted into the FAU Hall of Fame on October 28, 2006.

- 1999–2002 All-Atlantic Sun
- 1999 FAU Female Athlete of The Year
- 2000–2002 Atlantic Sun Player of The Year
- 2001–2002 Second Team All-American

== Statistics ==
=== FAU Owls ===
YEAR	W	L	GP	GS	CG	SHO	SV	IP	H	R	ER	BB	SO	ERA	WHIP
1999	24	10	39	30	28	5	2	225.2	163	87	66	94	211	2.05	1.14
2000	22	7	34	29	28	12	0	218.0	101	32	25	44	325	0.80	0.66
2001	26	13	42	28	25	11	1	258.0	113	34	21	75	403	0.57	0.73
2002	36	7	51	41	39	19	5	294.0	159	41	29	79	437	0.69	0.81
TOTALS	108	37	166	128	120	47	8	995.2	536	194	141	292	1376	0.99	0.83

YEAR	G	AB	R	H	BA	RBI	HR	3B	2B	TB	SLG	BB	SO	SB	SBA
1999	69	195	31	70	.359	46	12	2	17	127	.651%	29	28	1	3
2000	74	204	39	61	.299	39	11	2	11	109	.534%	38	43	4	5
2001	67	173	40	65	.375	49	19	2	5	131	.757%	57	21	1	1
2002	75	201	34	74	.368	40	12	0	16	126	.627%	52	21	0	1
TOTALS	285	773	144	270	.349	174	54	6	49	493	.638%	176	113	6	10

== See also ==
- NCAA Division I Softball career wins list
- NCAA Division I Softball career strikeouts list
- NCAA Division I softball career -1.00 ERAs list
- NCAA Division I softball career 50 home runs list
