= Alicia Hollowell =

American softball player (born 1984)

Personal information
- Full name: Alicia Kay Hollowell
- Born: February 29, 1984 (age 42) Fairfield, California, U.S.
- Height: 6 ft 1 in (185 cm)

Sport
- College team: Arizona Wildcats
Medal record
Women's softball
Representing United States
Olympic Games
Silver medal – second place	2008 Beijing	Team

Alicia Kay Hollowell-Dunn (born February 29, 1984) is an American former collegiate four-time All-American, retired professional softball pitcher, and assistant coach. She played college softball at Arizona Wildcats softball from 2003 to 2006, collecting 144 career wins and 1,768 strikeouts, both top-10 NCAA career records. She currently holds the Arizona Wildcats records for career strikeouts, shutouts and innings pitched, in addition to the Pac-12 Conference wins and strikeout ratio records. Hollowell won the 2006 Women's College World Series.

She was drafted fifth overall by the Arizona Heat in the National Pro Fastpitch but went on to play for the Akron Racers in 2007, leading them to the championship series before serving as an alternate for the United States women's national softball team at the 2008 Summer Olympics. For her collegiate career, Hollowell is one of five NCAA Division I pitchers to win 100 games, strikeout 1,000 batters, with a sub-1.00 ERA and average double digit strikeouts. Hollowell has been named by Tucson, Arizona sportswriters as #6 Best Arizona Wildcat Softball Player; voted by Arizona fans as the #1 Best Pitcher; selected #10 Best Division I Pitcher by the NCAA. Finally she was named a pitcher on the Pac-12 All-Century Team.

== Fairfield High School ==
Hollowell holds the national high school record for strikeouts in a single game with 61, collected in a 30-inning game against Woodland High School that started on May 25, was suspended, then concluded four days later on May 29; she took 364 pitches to accomplish the feat, five more than opposing pitcher Kelly Anderson, and gave up just 10 hits. Her performance bettered DeeDee Weiman's previous record of 53 strikeouts in a 29-inning game between Cerritos Gahr High School and Lakewood St. Joseph High School in 1986; in that same game, Lisa Fernandez struck out 48 batters (the fourth best high school outing) for Lakewood.

Hollowell also holds the Fairfield High School records for strikeouts in a career and strikeouts in a season. She earned the MVP Award all four years of her high school career, as well as being named First-Team All-State and All-Conference. She was also named the Gatorade State Player of The Year for 2001–2002, the Gatorade Softball Player of the Year for 2002, and the State Player of The Year also in 2002.

Finally, for Hollowell's career, she currently ranks top-5 with national high school records in strikeouts (2,238, first place); season strikeouts (641 & 636 in 2000 and 2001); perfect games (14); no-hitters (43); shutouts (111) and ERA (0.08).

== University of Arizona ==
=== 2003: Freshman Year ===
Hollowell earned Pac-10 Newcomer of the Year along with all-conference honors and a First-Team All-American selection. Her season total of 394 strikeouts topped the school record of 366, set by Jennie Finch the previous season; her total of 40 wins also broke Becky Lemke's previous school rookie record of 25 and was the best total nationally in 2003, while both totals led the Pac-10. She also tied the school season record for shutouts, a career best.

Hollowell made her official debut with a two-hit shutout, fanning 11 vs. the FAU Owls on January 31. She also pitched three no-hitters in her opening season, the first coming on February 8 vs. Wisconsin Badgers. Beginning on February 22 with a run-rule win of the Virginia Cavaliers, Hollowell had the longest scoreless inning streak of her career: 59.1 innings pitched, over 11 games (6 complete) and 10 wins. The streak was snapped in 5–2 win vs. the Cal State Fullerton Titans on March 22 when they scored in the third inning. Hollowell won back-to-back games against the No. 1 UCLA Bruins on April 5–6, going 14-innings and surrendering just one run, 6 hits and four walks.

Hollowell led the Wildcats to a No. 1 seed at the World Series with her 38–3 win–loss record. In her debut at the Women's College World Series, Hollowell pitched all of Arizona's games and left with a 2–2 record, falling in the semifinals. In her third game against California Golden Bears she struck out 17 in a 3–2 loss, her best showing at the WCWS until 2006. Hollowell was also a WCWS All-Tournament Team honoree.

=== 2004: Sophomore Year ===
Hollowell broke her own school records for strikeouts and wins with career bests 508 and 41 respectively. She earned Pac-10 "Pitcher of the Week" honors 5 times, for the weeks of February 17 – February 23, February 24 – March 1, March 2 – March 8, March 16 – March 22 and May 11 – May 16. Hollowell also repeated all-season honors including Pac-10 Pitcher of the Year for achieving the pitching Triple Crown, leading the conference in wins, ERA and strikeouts (was the fourth pitcher to earn the distinction). Her career best strikeout ratio of 12.1 led the NCAA Division I. Hollowell was also named one of three finalists for USA Softball Collegiate Player of the Year and the Honda Sports Award for softball.

Holowell threw two no-hitters, including one perfect game, a 6–0 win over the Indiana Hoosiers on March 6. In that game, she struck out a career and school best 20 of 21 batters faced to break Becky Lemke's single-game school record of 19 from March 11, 2000. In doing so, she also set the NCAA second-most strikeouts overall for a regulation game, behind only Michele Granger's total of 21 from 1991. This game also began an 18 consecutive strikeout streak: Hollowell finished the game fanning 13 straight batters. In a win over the UTEP Miners on March 7, she got a save by throwing a perfect inning and striking out all three batters faced. In her second no-hitter against the Missouri Tigers on March 12, she began the game striking out the first two batters before the streak ended with a ground ball to the mound. The perfect game was just the third in University of Arizona history, and the first since April 18, 1993; Hollowell was also only the second pitcher in UA history to throw a perfect game, as the preceding two had both been pitched by Susie Parra, in 1992 and 1993. In addition, she also would throw 19 consecutive hitless innings over the same period as this perfect game. On February 29 to begin the streak, she got a win over Stanford Cardinal and closed out the game with 1.1 hitless innings. Against Missouri, she would also throw two hitless innings in the second match-up of the series before retiring the first two Tigers in the finale on March 14 to complete the feat; both of the streaks were career highlights. Finally, around all of this, Hollowell also put together a career best 32 consecutive game wins streak (NCAA 5th best) from opening day on February 6 until it was snapped in a one-run loss to the Oregon Ducks on April 25. For the streak, Hollowell collected 389 strikeouts and maintained a 0.73 ERA and allowed 80 hits and 48 walks in 209.0 innings.

=== 2005: Junior Year ===
Hollowell threw 8 no-hitters (tied second for an NCAA season and the Junior Class records), three of them perfect games (also an NCAA season and Junior Class record), within her first 16 starts of the 2005 season. Hollowell again earned all-season honors from both the Pac-10 and the NCAA, as a Second Team honoree. She led the conference in ERA for a second consecutive season.

In one of Hollowell's no-hit performances vs. the Louisiana Tech Lady Techsters, she recorded her 1,000th career strikeout on February 26. The next day, she passed Jennie Finch's school record of 1,028 career strikeouts in a 1–0 win over Baylor Bears on February 27. Hollowell and Cat Osterman combined for 34 strikeouts at 11 and 23 respectively on March 17 for an NCAA top-10 record; the Wildcats lost 1–0. On April 2, she won her 100th career game in a 4–2 victory over the California Golden Bears.

Arizona and Hollowell made it back to the World Series but a title remained elusive. In game three for the Wildcats, Cat Osterman and the Texas Longhorns waged an 11-inning battle where Hollowell was brought in to relieve starter Leslie Wolfe, and the two combined for 30 strikeouts (a new WCWS record for combined strikeouts) before Arizona was sent home. Tracy Compton and Lisa Ishikawa of UCLA and Northwestern respectively held the record at 28 from 1984; the new record was tied in 2011.

=== 2006: Senior Year ===
Hollowell earned her final all-season honors and was again a finalist for National Player of the Year to accompany four no-hitters and a career best WHIP. Hollowell won her 120th career NCAA Division I game on February 25, beating Ohio State Buckeyes to tie Britni Sneed and Sarah Dawson for 6th place on the all-time wins list; on March 3, she beat Long Beach State 49ers to pass Sneed and Dawson and take sole possession of 6th place. She then beat the Baylor Bears in 5-innings on March 10 to record her 124th win and tie Nancy Evans' school record for fifth place on the all-time list. Two days later, she beat Baylor again to pass Evans and take over 5th place. Her 125th victory also gave her the career wins record for the Arizona Wildcats.

On April 14, Hollowell and Arizona State Sun Devils sophomore Katie Burkhart dueled for 10 innings, combining for the NCAA Division I single game 4th most combined strikeouts, at 15 and 22 respectively for a total of 37; Arizona lost 4–2. The combined total now stands 5th all-time for a single game.

Hollowell recorded her 130th and 131st career wins on April 30, beating Washington 2–0 and 10–1 to tie and surpass Keira Goerl for 4th place on the all-time list as well as ownership of the Pac-10 career record. She picked up her 140th career win, beating the Oregon State Beavers 3–2 in 9 innings on opening day at the Women's College World Series to pass Rhonda Wheatley for sole possession of third place for all-time wins. In games two and four at the WCWS, Hollowell beat Cat Osterman 2–0 (the first time in her career) and Monica Abbott 6–0 behind a 14-strikeout, two-hit shutout that eliminated Tennessee. The two pitchers and their teams defeated and eliminated the Wildcats the year prior at the World Series.

She won her 143rd career game by shutting out the Northwestern Wildcats 8–0 in Game One of the NCAA WCWS Championship on June 5. She won her 144th career game in a second consecutive shutout against Northwestern, 5–0, to finish her college career by winning the 2006 NCAA World Series crown, along with the "Most Outstanding Player" Award and another WCWS All-Tournament selection. Hollowell struck out 13 batters (matching fellow Wildcat Parra's 7-inning 1994 championship game record and setting it in the NCAA new format's deciding game) to reach a total of 64, cracking Debbie Doom's previous series record of 62 from 1982, the total still ranks third. Hollowell would graduate with the distinction of being the first pitcher in the top-10 NCAA Division I strikeouts list to claim a national title; it was the seventh championship for the University of Arizona.

Overall, Hollowell is tops in Arizona Wildcats career wins, strikeouts, shutouts, innings pitched and strikeout ratio. She also ranks top-10 in ERA. Hollowell is the wins and strikeout ratio queen for the newly named Pac-12 and ranks top-10 in virtually every other career pitching record. Finally, the Wildcat stands fourth in wins, perfect games (4) and no-hitters (17), 6th in strikeouts and shutouts and 7th in strikeout ratio (11.0) for an NCAA Division I career all-time.

Hollowell's prolific career at the WCWS includes an 8–5 record with 138 strikeouts, four shutouts, allowing 11 earned runs, 62 hits and 28 walks for a 0.74 ERA and 0.86 WHIP, averaging 9.2 strikeouts.

== USA National Team ==
Hollowell was selected early in 2004 to the USA Elite Team and competed at Canada Cup, Champions Cup and the World University Games in September. Altogether Hollowell collected 111 strikeouts, 0.96 ERA in 79.2 innings pitched. Her 62 strikeouts at Canada Cup remains a team-high record. She also recorded a perfect game at University Games, at the time it was the second for any USA Team.

In 2005 Hollowell was named to the National USA Softball Team for the summer. She recorded 6 strikeouts in 3.2 innings, allowing no earned runs at the ISF World Cup of Softball. Team USA earned the silver medal.

Again Hollowell made the roster after her senior season with the Wildcats and pitched 6 more strikeouts allowing no earned runs in 5-inning win at the World Cup. She brought home her first gold medal in late 2006.

The 2007 season with Team USA, Hollowell did not play in any games but won both at World Cup and the Pan American Games.

During the Bound 4 Beijing Tour, Hollowell held a 4–0 record with 42 strikeouts, 0.00 ERA in 23 innings and 8 appearances on the mound. She was later named an alternate for the 2008 Beijing Olympics.

== Professional career ==
Hollowell was drafted in the first round of the 2006 National Pro Fastpitch Senior Draft, the 5th overall pick by the now defunct Arizona Heat. Hollowell took time to finish her studies at Arizona and serve as an Undergraduate Assistant Coach before she eventually signed on with the Akron Racers for the 2007 season.

Following her tryout at the USA National Women's Softball camp for the 2008 Beijing Olympic Games, Hollowell made her professional debut on June 21, 2007, against the Rockford Thunder and fellow USA teammate and college rival Cat Osterman; she struck out 12 batters in the 7-inning win. In her lone season, she posted a 6–5 record, 70 strikeouts in 70.1 innings pitched with 15 runs on 50 hits and 18 walks issued; Hollowell led her team to second place in the regular season standings and a spot at the Championship Series. The Racers lost both of their starting games, including one to championship runner-up Rockford Thunder.

== Personal life ==
Hollowell has coached at two universities since 2007. That year, she was an assistant at Arizona. In August 2009, the University of California, Davis hired her as an assistant coach. Hollowell rejoined the Arizona Wildcats in 2011 in an operational role. She was promoted to Assistant Coach in the later half of the 2012 season and aims to continue her efforts.

Hollowell was named to ESPN Rise's All-Decade Team in 2009.

Hollowell was inducted into the University of Arizona's Athletic Hall of Fame on November 4, 2011.

In the fall of 2014, Hollowell left the Wildcat program to pursue other goals outside softball.

== Career statistics ==
Arizona Wildcats
YEAR	W	L	GP	GS	CG	SHO	SV	IP	H	R	ER	BB	SO	ERA	WHIP
2003	40	5	48	44	38	22	1	297.0	138	44	40	74	394	0.94	0.71
2004	41	4	48	44	38	21	1	293.2	138	39	33	68	508	0.79	0.70
2005	31	9	48	38	34	18	3	279.0	143	54	35	51	446	0.88	0.69
2006	32	5	41	39	36	20	1	252.1	133	40	32	39	420	0.89	0.68
TOTALS	144	23	185	165	146	81	6	1122.0	552	177	140	232	1768	0.87	0.70

United States National Team
YEAR	W	L	GP	GS	CG	SHO	SV	IP	H	R	ER	BB	SO	ERA	WHIP
2004	8	3	14	10	8	6	2	79.2	33	10	7	3	111	0.96	0.45
2005	0	1	2	1	0	0	0	3.2	6	4	0	0	6	0.00	1.87
2006	1	0	1	1	1	1	0	5.0	4	0	0	0	6	0.00	0.80
2008	4	0	8	4	1	1	0	23.0	2	0	0	6	42	0.00	0.35
TOTALS	13	4	25	16	10	8	2	111.1	45	14	7	9	165	0.44	0.48

Akron Racers
YEAR	W	L	GS	CG	SV	IP	H	R	ER	BB	SO	ERA	WHIP
2007	6	5	10	9	0	70.1	50	15	12	18	70	1.20	0.97

== Links ==
- NCAA Division I softball career wins list
- NCAA Division I softball career strikeouts list
- NCAA Division I softball career -1.00 ERAs list
