= Katie Burkhart =

American softball player (born 1986)

Biographical details
- Born: February 24, 1986 (age 40); San Luis Obispo, California, U.S.

Playing career
- 2005–2008: Arizona State
- 2008: Philadelphia Force
- 2010: USSSA Pride
- 2012: Carolina Diamonds
- 2013: NY/NJ Comets
- Position: Pitcher

Coaching career (HC unless noted)
- 2012: Central Connecticut (pitching)
- 2015: Tennessee State (pitching)

Accomplishments and honors

Championships
- Women's College World Series (2008); Pac-10 (2008)

Awards
- Women's College World Series MOP (2008); 2× first-team NFCA All-American (2007, 2008); 2× first-team All-Pac-10 (2007, 2008); Pac-10 Pitcher of the Year (2007)

Katherine Burkhart (born February 24, 1986) is an American, former collegiate All-American, retired professional All-Star softball pitcher and softball coach. She played college softball at Arizona State, and won a national championship with the team in 2008 and was named Most Outstanding Player. Burkhart holds the career records in wins, strikeouts, perfect games, WHIP, innings pitched and strikeout ratio for the school. She also ranks in several career pitching categories and the top-10 for strikeouts and perfect games for both the Pac-12 Conference and the NCAA Division I. She has also pitched for the USA Softball team. She also helped remove snakes from a plane that was bound from Hawaii to Phoenix in 2023.

Burkhart was drafted first overall and played for the USSSA Pride, Tennessee Diamonds and Carolina Diamonds in the National Pro Fastpitch, where she currently is a top-10 career leader in strikeout ratio, WHIP and complete games. Additionally she also played in Japan. Following the 2012 NPF season, Burkhart announced her retirement as a player. In 2011 she was inducted into the SLOHS & ASA Hall of Fame. Following her career her Jersey was retired from Arizona State University in 2017. Then in 2018 she was inducted to the Arizona State University Hall of Fame.

== Arizona State Sun Devils ==
Burkhart began her freshman year with a top-5 season strikeouts record and throwing a no-hitter on March 4, 2005, vs. the San Diego State Aztecs. She debuted on February 5 throwing two shutout innings with two strikeouts to earn her first save against the UTSA Roadrunners.

For her sophomore campaign, Burkhart was named to the Pac-10 Second Team. She threw a no-hitter and set new school records in strikeouts, shutouts (tied), innings pitched and strikeout ratio. Her wins were good for second all-time; all of her marks remain top-10 for the Sun Devils.

Beginning on March 2 in a win over the Southern Utah Thunderbirds, Burkhart went on a career best 41.2 consecutive scoreless inning streak that was snapped in a 10-inning loss to the FSU Seminoles on March 16. For the streak, Burkhart went 6–1 over 9 games (4 complete) fanning 69 and giving up 17 hits and 4 walks for a 0.51 WHIP. On April 8, Burkhart set a school and career record by recording 23 strikeouts in a loss to the Washington Huskies. The single game total tied her for 5th all-time in the NCAA. Combined with pitchers Caitlin Noble and Danielle Lawrie, the game featured the then most strikeouts combined ever in a game at 42. Later on April 14, Burkhart won a 10-inning duel with Alicia Hollowell and the Arizona Wildcats to combine for an NCAA record 37 strikeouts. On May 11, Burkhart tossed a 15 strikeout, one-hit shutout over Washington; the game featured the most combined strikeouts ever in a regulation game at 34, which she also holds with Lawrie. The Sun Devils made it to that year's Women's College World Series and had a win over the Oregon State Beavers but eventually were eliminated by the Tennessee Vols in extra innings on June 3, 2006.

In her junior year, Burkhart earned her first 2007 NFCA First Team All-American citation to accompany First Team Pac-10 and Pitcher of the Year honors. She set the season strikeouts and innings record with career bests, while also breaking her own wins and strikeout ratio marks and tying the shutout record again.

Burkhart fired her first career perfect game against the Notre Dame Fighting Irish on March 15. Later on April 24, Burkhart reached 1,000 strikeouts in relief vs. the UNLV Rebels. She joined an exclusive list of NCAA Division I pitchers to accomplish the feat in three season or less.

For her senior year, she was awarded First Team All-American, All-Pac-10 and Pitcher of the Year for a second year in a row. Burkhart achieved the conference pitching Triple Crown for her strikeouts, wins and ERA (the two latter both career best). Her shutouts, WHIP and strikeout ratio (11.3) were also career highs and together with her wins set new school records; in addition, her ERA was ranked in the top-10 also for a season. She threw two perfect games.

On February 15, Burkhart struck out 18 Western Michigan Broncos in 7-innings for a career high in regulation. That same game also started a career best 15 consecutive game win streak that was snapped on March 20 in a one-run loss to the FSU Seminoles. Defeating the Arizona Wildcats on April 9, Burkhart won her 100th career game.

Arizona State won the 2008 Women's College World Series, and Burkhart was named the Most Outstanding Player on June 3 vs. the Texas A&M Aggies. She pitched back-to-back shutouts against Aggies with 13 strikeouts in the final game to clinch the title. This was Arizona State's first WCWS championship under the current format. She also matched the finale game record for strikeouts with the 13 in the game. To get there the Sun Devil went undefeated and ended her career on an 11-game win streak.

In her career overall, Burkhart set and owns the Arizona State records for wins, strikeouts, shutouts, strikeout ratio and innings pitched. She is top-10 in the newly named Pac-12 for the same records. In the NCAA, Burkhart ranks 7th in strikeouts and is tied 5th for perfect games (3) for her career.

During the summer of 2007, Burkhart also competed in the Amateur Softball Association with other college players on the Stratford Brakettes.

== Professional career ==
On February 18, 2008, before her final season at Arizona State, Burkhart was selected first overall in the National Pro Fastpitch Draft. After posting league highs of 13 wins and a 1.87 ERA along with team highs of 149 strikeouts, 15 complete games, and 131 2/3 innings pitched during her rookie season in the NPF, Burkhart was voted as the NPF Player of the Year. For the American offseason, Burkhart commenced her rookie season in the Japan Softball League, for Toyota Shokki - the team Michelle Smith has played with for 16 years. Burkhart has played for the Philadelphia Force, USSSA Pride, & the Carolina Diamonds, before retiring in 2012. Since then she has coached D1 programs as the assistant coach and runs Pitch Responsibly, Inc. a company dedicated to giving back to the young women and parents in the sport.

In 2016 alone she was announced as Pac-10 All-Century team along with players like Lisa Fernandez, Jennie Finch, Natasha Watley, etc. and ASU retiring her #7 jersey in honor of her outstanding records held at the university. She has also been inducted into the ASA Hall of Fame and her high school, San Luis Obispo as a Hall of Fame Athlete. In April 2016 Arizona State University honored her by retiring #7, before their game against the Oregon Ducks.

== International competition ==
In 2006, Burkhart was part of an American team of college players that won gold at the 2006 World University Games in Taiwan.

Burkhart was first named to the USA Softball national team on June 15, 2009. She made her first appearance at the 2009 Canada Cup and combined with Jennie Finch to pitch a no-hitter against the Netherlands, which the United States won 8–0 in five innings due to the run rule.

== Coaching career ==
In 2012, Burkhart was pitching coach at Central Connecticut, helping the program to its first 30-win season. In 2015, Burkhart was pitching coach at Tennessee State.

== Career statistics ==
Arizona State Sun Devils
YEAR	W	L	GP	GS	CG	SHO	SV	IP	H	R	ER	BB	SO	ERA	WHIP
2005	12	14	38	29	15	6	5	184.1	116	55	40	29	220	1.52	0.79
2006	30	8	44	38	32	13	1	268.2	152	59	44	42	420	1.15	0.72
2007	35	13	54	42	41	13	2	323.0	155	68	51	51	517	1.10	0.64
2008	41	5	52	41	41	21	4	315.1	143	44	34	49	513	0.75	0.61
TOTALS	118	40	188	150	129	53	12	1091.1	566	226	169	171	1670	1.08	0.67
