= Nicole Newman =

American softball pitcher and coach

Personal information
- Nationality: American
- Born: October 3, 1996 (age 30)
- Height: 6 ft 1 in (1.85 m)

Sport
- Country: USA
- Sport: Softball
- College team: Drake Bulldogs

Nicole Newman (born October 3, 1996) is an American former collegiate and professional softball pitcher and current collegiate softball coach.

Originally from Madison, Wisconsin, Newman attended La Follette High School in Madison and played college softball at Drake University. She is currently the pitching coach at Florida Atlantic University.

== Drake University ==
Newman played for the Drake Bulldogs from 2015-19. She suffered a season-ending injury in her junior season and earned a medical redshirt.

During her freshman season in 2015, Newman was named the Missouri Valley Conference Freshman of the Year and earned First Team All-Conference and Second Team All-Midwest Region honors. She led the league with a 1.94 ERA and a .188 opponent's batting average.

As a sophomore in 2016, Newman earned MVC Pitcher of the Year honors and was again named to the all-conference first team and the all-region second team. She set a program single-season record with 286 strikeouts and her 22 wins ranked second all-time in Drake history.

At the time of her injury in her junior season, Newman held a 7-3 record with a 1.27 ERA and 94 strikeouts. She led the nation in strikeouts at the time of her injury in late February.

Upon her return from injury as a redshirt junior in 2018, Newman returned to form as one of the MVC's all-time best arms. She earned the second MVC Pitcher of the Year award of her career, was named to the all-conference and all-region first teams, and was named an NFCA 3rd Team All-American. Other accolades during the 2018 season included being named a Top 25 finalist for the USA Softball Collegiate Player of the Year award, being named the Most Valuable Player of the Missouri Valley conference tournament, and setting a new Drake career record with her 800th career strikeout.

Newman became the first-ever Drake softball player to be named a First Team All-American in 2019. She earned the third MVC Pitcher of the Year award of her career, was a first-team all-conference selection, was named the MVP of the conference tournament for the second consecutive season, and led the nation in strikeouts with 423. Her 1.07 ERA as a redshirt senior ranked third in the nation.

During her redshirt senior season, Newman tied an NCAA Division 1 record with five perfect games.

She led Drake to back-to-back postseason appearances, winning conference titles and qualifiying for the 2018 NCAA Division I softball tournament and 2019 NCAA Division I softball tournament.

== Collegiate Records ==
At Drake, Newman holds career records for appearances, wins, shutouts, no hitters, perfect games, and strikeouts. She holds single-season program records for wins and strikeouts.

Newman holds a number of Missouri Valley Conference career records, including no hitters, perfect games, strikeouts, and strikeout ratio.

== Professional career ==
In 2019, Newman was drafted by the Aussie Peppers of the National Pro Fastpitch league. She was selected in the third round, No. 13 overall, of the 2019 NPF Draft.

In her first NPF season, she posted a 4.25 ERA with 28 strikeouts.

Newman signed with Athletes Unlimited in 2021 and played one season.

== Coaching career ==
Newman spent the 2020 and 2021 seasons as a graduate manager at Minnesota. She was hired as an assistant coach at Creighton on July 16, 2021 and spent one season with the Bluejays.

In July 2022, Newman joined the coaching staff at Florida Atlantic. Serving as the Owls' pitching coach, Newman tutored the Conference USA Pitcher of the Year in Gabby Sacco in 2022, the American Conference Pitcher of the Year in Autumn Courtney in 2024, and two All-Americans in Trinity Schlotterbeck in 2024 and Courtney in 2025.

== Statistics ==
=== Drake Bulldogs ===
YEAR	W	L	GP	GS	CG	SHO	SV	IP	H	R	ER	BB	SO	ERA	WHIP
2015	13	5	26	20	12	5	2	133.1	92	42	36	61	175	1.89	1.15
2016	22	13	37	32	26	4	1	220.0	189	114	93	90	286	2.96	1.27
2017	7	3	12	8	5	2	2	55.0	28	21	10	19	94	1.27	0.85
2018	22	5	29	26	15	9	1	157.2	77	24	20	36	245	0.89	0.72
2019	29	7	46	31	28	14	5	221.2	85	45	34	45	423	1.07	0.59
TOTALS	93	33	150	117	86	34	11	787.2	471	246	193	251	1223	1.71	0.91
