= NY/NJ Comets =

Women's professional softball team

- Logo

Information
- League: National Pro Fastpitch
- Location: Ramapo, New York; Montclair, New Jersey; Bridgewater, New Jersey; Allentown, Pennsylvania
- Ballpark: Provident Bank Park; Yogi Berra Stadium; TD Bank Ballpark; Coca-Cola Park
- Founded: 2013
- Ownership: Comets Pro Softball, LLC
- Management: Michael Neuwirth
- Manager: Jay Nelson

The New York/New Jersey Comets were a women's professional softball team that played for one season. In February 2013, National Pro Fastpitch announced the Comets as an expansion team, replacing the Carolina Diamonds which had folded at the end of the 2012 season. The team played home games at several sites in 2013: Provident Bank Park in Ramapo, New York, Yogi Berra Stadium in Montclair, New Jersey, TD Bank Ballpark in Bridgewater, New Jersey, and Coca-Cola Park in Allentown, Pennsylvania.

The Comets were named in honor of the women who played in the All-American Girls Professional Baseball League and specifically after the Kenosha Comets, one of the founding members of the AAGPBL.

== Roster ==
The Comets assumed the rights to players that were previously held by Carolina.

Player	Number	Position	Bats	Throws	College
Angel Bunner	15	P	L	L	Auburn
Olivia Galati	2	P/DH	R	R	Hofstra
Taryne Mowatt	9	P	R	R	Arizona
Sarah Plourde	27	P	R	R	UMass
Lindsay Richardson	5	P	R	R	South Florida
Amy Hooks	10	C/OF	R	R	Texas
Amanda Kamekona	47	2B/IF	R	R	UCLA
Brittany Mckinney	22	C	R	R	North Carolina
Bianca Meija	28	SS	R	R	Long Island U.
Angeline Quiocho	8	OF	R	R	BYU
Kelsi Weseman	18	3B/IF	L	R	Georgia Tech
