= Anjelica Selden =

American softball player (born 1986)

Anjelica Maria Selden (born April 26, 1986) is a former collegiate All-American, softball pitcher and coach. She played for UCLA and is the career leader in strikeouts. She also pitched internationally.

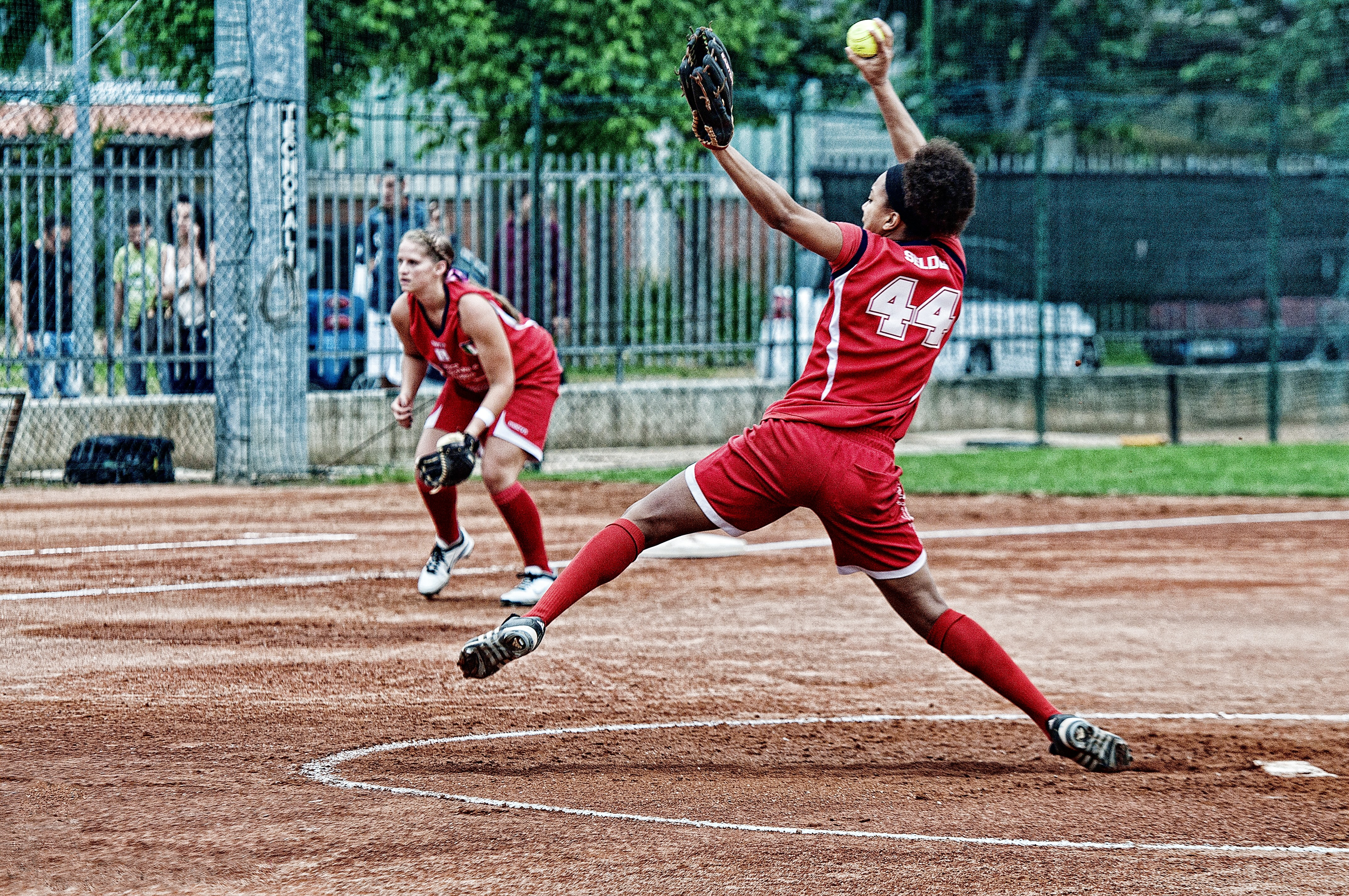
Anjelica Selden during a match vs La Loggia softball

== Vanden High School ==
Selden, who is African-American, was a standout player who eventually earned the 2004 Gatorade Softball Player of the Year award. She also owns high school national records for ERA (0.06; best mark ever) and shutouts (82). As a senior, she pitched 10 consecutive no-hitters and seven perfect games.

== UCLA ==
Selden began her career by earning 2005 Second Team National Fastpitch Coaches' Association All-American, All-Pac-10 and Pac-10 Newcomer of the Year honors. Her strikeouts and innings pitched were both new school records that remain tops for UCLA. Her wins and career best strikeout ratio (10.4) were good for school top-10 marks all-time.

Selden debuted on January 30, 2005 with a three-hit, one-run win, striking out 14 of the UCSB Gauchos. On February 27, Selden lost an 8-inning duel with Cat Osterman and the Texas Longhorns and combined for 31 strikeouts. During Selden's record breaking week of March 4–6, she registered a career best 23 strikeouts against the Ole Miss Rebels in a 14-inning battle, the Bruins eventually lost 3-2 in that game. The single game total was a Bruin record, second only to Debbie Doom's total of 25, and was tied fifth all-time in the NCAA Division I for a single game. In addition, the combined total of 38 with Rebels pitcher Mary Jane Callahan ranked second and now is 4th all-time for a single game. The next day, Selden threw her first career no-hitter vs. the St. John's Red Storm. The day after she pitched a second consecutive no-hitter, defeating the Fresno State Bulldogs. Each game was only one batter away from a perfect game.

At the 2005 Women's College World Series, Selden led her team to the championship game where they lost back-to-back, despite a first-game shutout win, in the newly established three-games title format to first-time winner, the No. 1 seeded Michigan Wolverines. In game two, Selden struck out 13 to set a new championship single game record in the three-games setup; UCLA Bruins great Debbie Doom holds the ultimate record of 15 strikeouts in the 1984 championship. Selden made the WCWS All-Tournament Team also for setting another lasting championship finals record by totaling 34 strikeouts in three games.

Following up her freshman season, Selden repeated all-season honors including a First Team All-American selection. She bettered her own records with her season wins and shutouts to go along with her strikeouts and innings, all top 10 season records for UCLA. She also pitched her second school Triple Crown, leading in ERA, strikeouts and wins.

With a February 19 shutout win in 10-innings over the Fresno State Bulldogs, Selden went on to a 12 consecutive game win streak that was broken by a one-run loss to the Northwestern Wildcats on March 26.

Selden tossed her 1,000th career strikeout on March 7, 2007, in a win vs. the Cal State Fullerton Titans. On April 29, she broke Keira Goerl's all-time career strikeouts school record against the Oregon State Beavers. Selden closed the season recording 1,106, having become only the fourth softball player of color to break into the NCAA Division I elite 1,000 Strikeouts Club and just one of select players to get it done in three seasons.

For a final time Selden earned all-season honors, including her second First Team All-American award. She posted a career best ERA and WHIP. Selden fanned 17 of the Northwestern Wildcats on February 24, 2008 for a 6-2 win and a career best for strikeouts in a regulation game. She allowed runs in the fourth inning and then began a career best 33.0 consecutive scoreless innings streak that was broken in an extra-inning loss to the Cal State Fullerton Titans on March 12 when they scored in the eighth inning. For the streak, Selden was 4-1 with three complete games and 49 strikeouts, allowing 12 hits and 4 walks. A victory on April 18 against the Washington Huskies was the 100th of her career.

Selden also pitched the Bruins to their third appearance at the Women's College World Series and a No. 2 seed after the Bruins nearly fell out of the top 20 the previous season. They were eventually defeated by the No. 1 Florida Gators on May 31. She was later also awarded with Team MVP on June 8.

Selden would conclude her career with 1,441 strikeouts, which gave her the career crown for the UCLA Bruins. Her strikeout ratio of 9.9 was second only to alum DeeDee Weiman. She did and does still rank top-10 in wins, shutouts and innings pitched. Selden is a top-10 wins and strikeouts career pitcher in the new Pac-12 conference. Finally, her record single game strikeout totals still rank in the NCAA Division I all-time.

== Professional career ==
In the 2008 National Pro Fastpitch Senior Draft first round, Selden was selected fourth overall by the New England Riptide. She elected not to play professionally in the NPF. She played for the Des Caserta softball team, a professional team in Italy.

Selden served as an Undergraduate Assistant for the 2009 season at her alma mater.

== Coaching career ==
On July 23, 2018, Selden joined Diane Ninemire's coaching staff at California as pitching coach.

== Career statistics ==
=== UCLA Bruins ===
YEAR	W	L	GP	GS	CG	Sh	SV	IP	H	R	ER	BB	SO	ERA	WHIP
2005	29	14	50	42	42	13	2	325.0	187	70	51	46	485	1.10	0.71
2006	35	7	44	37	37	16	1	282.2	153	55	43	80	408	1.06	0.82
2007	17	11	33	28	20	7	0	171.0	139	96	69	66	213	2.82	1.20
2008	29	5	40	35	28	8	2	233.2	119	51	32	40	335	0.96	0.68
TOTALS	110	37	167	145	127	44	5	1012.1	598	272	195	232	1441	1.35	0.82

== Links ==
- NCAA Division I softball career wins list
- NCAA Division I softball career strikeouts list
