= Blaire Luna =

American softball player

Personal information
- Born: 1990 (age 35–36) Austin, Texas, U.S.
- Height: 5 ft 8 in (1.73 m)

Sport
- Country: USA
- Sport: Softball
- College team: Texas Longhorns

Blaire Luna (born 1990) is an American, former collegiate All-American, right-handed pro softball pitcher, originally from Austin, Texas. She attended Bowie High School in Austin, Texas. She later attended the University of Texas at Austin, where she pitched for the Texas Longhorns softball team in the Big 12 Conference and was named a Second Team and three-time First Team All-Conference honoree. She currently ranks 10th in career strikeout ratio for the NCAA Division I. In her senior year, Luna led Texas softball to a berth in the 2013 Women's College World Series semifinals, where they lost to Tennessee, 2–0. She later went on to play professional softball for the USSSA Pride of National Pro Fastpitch, and internationally in New Zealand.

== College ==
Luna debuted for the Longhorns on February 12, no hitting the DePaul Blue Demons in 8 innings. The next day, she defeated them again with a career best 17 strikeouts in regulation. On March 28 to April 7, Luna fired 43.0 consecutive scoreless innings over eight games, winning 5 and allowing 10 hits, 13 walks while fanning 83 batters for a 0.53 WHIP. As a sophomore beginning on March 10 to April 27, Luna won 15 consecutives games for a career highlight. She would allow 44 hits, 10 earned runs, 35 walks in 101.0 innings, striking out 146 for a 0.69 ERA, 0.78 WHIP and 0.129 opponents batting average. During the streak on March 17, Luna tossed a perfect game against the Washington Huskies. In her senior season, Luna defeated the No. 1 Oklahoma Sooners on April 20 in a four-hit, 8 strikeout game. She would later help the Longhorns into the 2013 Women's College World Series and threw two victories before losing to the Tennessee Lady Vols in the semifinals on June 2, pitching a complete game allowing 2 runs and striking out 12 in her last appearance.

== Statistics ==
=== Texas Longhorns ===
YEAR	W	L	GP	GS	CG	SHO	SV	IP	H	R	ER	BB	SO	ERA	WHIP
2010	30	10	46	34	28	11	4	242.1	112	57	48	101	404	1.39	0.88
2011	28	7	38	34	30	16	0	232.1	133	51	42	84	316	1.26	0.93
2012	22	6	38	29	21	8	3	188.0	136	72	63	96	286	2.34	1.23
2013	32	7	41	38	30	13	0	251.2	113	57	46	126	422	1.28	0.95
TOTALS	112	30	163	135	109	48	7	914.1	494	237	199	407	1428	1.52	0.98
