= Danielle Lawrie =

Canadian softball player (born 1987)

- Pitcher
- Born: April 11, 1987 (age 39); Burnaby, British Columbia, Canada
- Bats: Right Throws: Right

NPF debut
- July 30, 2010, for the USSSA Pride

NPF statistics
- Win–loss record: 25–11
- Earned run average: 2.53
- Strikeouts: 288
- Shutouts: 9
- Complete games: 24
- Innings pitched: 293.2

Teams
- Washington Huskies (2006–2010); USSSA Pride (2010–2014); Canadian Wild (2019)

Career highlights and awards
- NPF All-Star (2011); 2× USA Softball Collegiate Player of the Year (2009, 2010); Women's College World Series champion (2009); WCWS All-tournament team (2009); WCWS Most Outstanding Player (2009); 2× Honda Sports Award winner for softball; 2× Cowles Cup champion (2013, 2014)
Medals
Women's softball
Representing Canada
Olympic Games
Bronze medal – third place	2020 Tokyo	Team
Pan American Games
Silver medal – second place	2007 Rio de Janeiro
Silver medal – second place	2019 Lima
World Championships
Bronze medal – third place	2010 Caracas
Bronze medal – third place	2018 Chiba

Danielle Elaine Lawrie (born April 11, 1987) is a Canadian, former collegiate All-American, medal-winning Olympian, professional All-Star softball pitcher and current sports commentator. Lawrie played college softball at Washington, in which she was part of the 2009 Women's College World Series championship team and was named Most Outstanding Player. Lawrie formerly played for the Canada women's national softball team, including during the 2008 Summer Olympics, and the 2020 Summer Olympics, where she won a bronze medal.

From 2010 to 2014 and in 2019, Lawrie played for the USSSA Pride and Canadian Wild of National Pro Fastpitch (NPF) and was an NPF All-Star in 2011 and part of two Cowles Cup league championship teams in 2013 and 2014. She owns numerous records for the Huskies as well as the Pac-12, where she is the career leader in strikeouts, and ranks fourth all-time in the NCAA Division I.

== Early life ==
Danielle, the daughter of Cheryl and Russ Lawrie, grew up and currently resides in Langley, British Columbia.

Her younger brother, Brett, a former major league baseball player with the Toronto Blue Jays, Oakland Athletics and Chicago White Sox, began playing with the Canadian national junior team at the age of 15, and played for Team Canada in the 2008 Summer Olympics.

Her older sister named Nicole died in an accident when she was only 5, before Brett was even born. She and Brett have special tattoos in her memory.

She attended Brookswood Secondary School, where she lettered in softball, also helping the team to three league championships. She was named Most Valuable Player in her freshman and senior years, and was a first team All-Star four years and team captain three times. In addition to softball, Lawrie also lettered in basketball. She played summer ball for the White Rock Renegades for five years under coach Rick Sullivan, and was named the MVP of the 2005 Canadian National Team. After graduating from Brookswood, she went on to the University of Washington, becoming the first Canadian on the team.

== University of Washington ==
Lawrie began her career by being named to the then Pac-10 2006 Second Team. She broke the Husky season record for strikeouts and strikeout ratio. On February 10, Lawrie debuted with a run-rule win over the Oklahoma Sooners, striking out 7 batters and later threw her first career perfect game on February 26 vs. the Utah Valley Wolverines.

On March 16, Lawrie combined with Cat Osterman for 32 strikeouts in a regulation game, a top-10 NCAA record for a single game, the Huskies lost 3–0. In another 11-inning battle, she and teammate Caitlin Noble combined with Katie Burkhart of the Arizona State Sun Devils to strike out 42 batters. This was another NCAA record for combined strikeouts overall. In an April 26 win, Lawrie struck out 19 of the No. 1 UCLA Bruins, her first victory over a top-ranked team. In her next start, she set yet another record for combined strikeouts in a loss to the Sun Devils when she struck out 19 batters again, combining with Katie Burkhart for 34 strikeouts; the game was especially notable because it was the highest combined total for a 7-inning game. Finally, on May 12, Lawrie lost another extra inning game to the California Golden Bears and combined with Kristina Thorson for another 32 strikeouts at 14 and 18 respectively.

As a sophomore, Lawrie earned National Fastpitch Coaches Association First Team All-American and Pac-10 First Team selections. She broke her own strikeouts and strikeout ratio (still tops and career best: 11.5) records; she was ranked and still does in the top-5 for her school season marks in wins, shutouts and innings pitched; the strikeouts and wins were also top-5 for the NCAA year. Lawrie also had a career high in doubles and threw a no-hitter.

In a win over the South Florida Bulls on February 18, Lawrie struck out a school and career high 20 batters in 7 innings to tie her for second highest in an NCAA regulation game. The Huskies made it to the Women's College World Series and Lawrie responded by tossing a no-hitter over the DePaul Blue Demons on May 31. They were semifinalists before being eliminated by eventual champions the Arizona Wildcats on June 3.

For her junior campaign, Lawrie repeated honors from the NFCA, as well as being named Pac-10 Pitcher of the Year, USA Softball Collegiate Player of the Year, and winning the Honda Sports Award for softball. Lawrie set school records for her season wins, strikeouts, WHIP, and innings (career highs), leading the NCAA in all except WHIP. Her shutouts, ERA, and strikeout ratio were and remain in the top-10 for a Husky season. They also ranked in the top-10 for an NCAA season and helped Lawrie win a Pac-10 pitching Triple Crown. She also threw two no-hitters.

Beginning on February 7, 2009, with a win over Loyola Marymount Lions, Lawrie achieved a 64.1 consecutive scoreless innings streak. The Portland State Vikings snapped it on March 1 when they scored in the third inning. During the streak, Lawrie won all 11 games (7 complete) and struck out 112, allowing only 15 hits and 11 base on balls for a 0.40 WHIP. A week later on March 7, Lawrie garnered her 1,000th career strikeout in a win over the Alabama Crimson Tide. After another week, Lawrie combined with Morgan Melloh of the Fresno State Bulldogs for 31 strikeouts in an 11-inning win for the Huskies on March 14.

In the NCAA tournament, Lawrie and the Huskies won their region with a 15-inning, 6–1 victory over the UMass Minutewomen on May 18. Lawrie fanned a school and career best 24 batters and, with Brandice Balschmiter's 14 strikeouts, combined for an NCAA top-10 combined strikeouts single game record at 38. Lawrie's total was also fourth-place tie for an individual pitcher in a single game. At the World Series, Lawrie fought through to the finals, including beginning a career best 21 consecutive game win streak on May 31, defeating the Georgia Bulldogs; the streak would resume and conclude in the 2010 season. Lawrie led the Huskies in back-to-back wins over the No. 1 seeded Florida Gators and in the finale, struck out 8 and drove in the game-winning run to earn MVP and All-Tournament honors.

In her final season, Lawrie earned 2010 First Team from the NFCA and the Pac-10, as well as her second conference Pitcher of The Year. She also picked up her second USA and Honda Sports Award for softball, becoming the first since Cat Osterman with multiple awards for both. Lawrie led the NCAA in shutouts and broke her own record. She ranked, and still ranks, top-5 in season records for the Huskies in wins (also led NCAA), strikeouts, strikeout ratio and innings pitched; these would help earn her another pitching Triple Crown for the Pac-10. She led the team in home runs, RBIs and slugging percentage with career highs, which she also achieved in batting average, hits and walks. She pitched four no-hitters, three of which were perfect games (an NCAA tying top-5 season record).

To start the 2010 season, Lawrie won her first 18 decisions to combine with a last three from 2009 for a 21 consecutive game win streak. The UCLA Bruins broke it on April 1 to open the Pac-10 season. Lawrie fanned 227 batters while allowing 17 earned runs, 70 hits and 17 walks for a 1.03 ERA and 0.61 WHIP for the streak. For one of the wins, on February 19, Lawrie won her 100th career game vs. the UCSB Gauchos. For one of her no-hitters, she would achieve a career feat of 14 consecutive perfect innings pitched that began in a win over the Hawaii Rainbow Wahine on March 7 when she retired the final batter by strikeout. She then threw a perfect game over the Miami RedHawks on March 11 before coming within one out of a second perfect game vs. the Portland State Vikings on March 13. Lawrie stuck out 27 batters and won all three games of the streak. On May 15, in a run-rule win over the Arizona State Sun Devils, Lawrie posted career highs in single game hits (3) and RBIs (5). Although the Huskies made it back to defend their National title, they were eventually eliminated by the Arizona Wildcats on June 5.

Lawrie holds the University of Washington crown in career wins, shutouts, strikeouts, strikeout ratio, starts, appearances, complete games and innings. She also ranks top-10 in career home runs. She holds the now-named Pac-12 record for most Player of the Week honors in a career and season and is the all-time conference career strikeouts leader, while ranking top-10 in several other pitching categories. In the NCAA, Lawrie is 4th in career strikeouts, 6th in wins and innings, 8th in strikeout ratio (10.9) and tied 5th in perfect games (4).

Lawrie did not play for the Huskies in their 2008 season because she was representing the Canadian National Team at the 2008 Olympic Games in Beijing, China.

== Team Canada ==
Lawrie was one of 15 players selected to represent Canada in the 2008 Olympic Games in Beijing, China, where she made three appearances and pitched 12 innings. In her first Olympic appearance, she earned a victory in Canada's 9–2 win over the Netherlands, striking out four in four innings of work, while allowing just one run on two hits. She also hurled a complete game against Venezuela in which she struck out nine batters, allowing just two runs on four hits, but Canada was unable to support her in a 2–0 loss. In all, she struck out 13 batters in 12 innings at Beijing.

Prior to the 2008 Olympic Games, Lawrie was a member of the Canadian National Team in 2005, '06, '07 and '08. She also spent one season on the Canadian Junior National team, and one on the Developmental Team. She helped the National Team qualify for the 2008 Olympics at the 2006 World Cup. In October 2007 at the China Cup, held in Beijing, the Canadians won all three of the games in which Lawrie started, and received the silver medal. Lawrie finished the seven-day tournament with a 3–0 record and a team-best 1.29 ERA. Her 21 2/3 innings pitched and 18 strikeouts also led the team. She had her best performance of the China Cup against Australia, which had already defeated the Canadians twice in the tournament, pitching seven shutout innings while giving up just two hits and striking out three in leading the team to a 4–0 win. At the 2006 World Cup, Lawrie threw a complete-game shutout against Australia with seven strikeouts. She was named Most Valuable Pitcher at the 2006 Canada Cup, where the team was awarded a silver medal. She threw 6 2/3 innings of relief against the Netherlands, giving up just one run and striking out 13 batters. She tossed a complete-game shutout with five strikeouts against Italy at the 2006 ISF World Championships, where she also earned a shutout victory over Chinese Taipei with eight strikeouts. She was named to Beat Team USA at the 2005 World Cup, tossing a complete game and striking out seven.

Lawrie returned from retirement to retrain to compete for the 2020 Summer Olympics and helped Canada qualify as runner-up at the 2019 Americas Qualifier. She clinched their spot with a run-rule shutout of Brazil, allowing a hit and fanning 8. At the Tokyo Olympics, she went 1-1 and earned the win in the bronze medal game, defeating Team Mexico 3–2 on July 27, 2021.

== National Pro Fastpitch ==
In 2010, Lawrie joined the professional ranks of the NPF as a pitcher for the USSSA Pride. Danielle wears number 15 for Pride as she did for the Washington Huskies. Danielle pitched her first game for the Pride on July 30, 2010, against the Chicago Bandits. The final score of Lawrie's first game was 8–3 in favor of the Chicago Bandits. In 2011, Lawrie was named an All-Star for the Pride. Beginning on June 26-August 3, she won 8 consecutive games for a career best. For those wins, Lawrie threw 52.0 and gave up 24 hits, 10 earned runs, 18 walks and collected 55 strikeouts for a 1.34 ERA and 0.81 WHIP. Beginning on the same day until July 9, Lawrie achieved 27.1 consecutive scoreless innings with 10 hits, 7 walks and 29 strikeouts for a 0.62 WHIP. To open the 2012 season, she struck out a career best 13 batters in a 9–3, June 8 win vs. the Chicago Bandits. Lawrie would also bookend her first tenure by winning two Cowles Cup Championships in 2010 and 2014. In 2019, she joined the Canadian Wild. Lawrie currently ranks top-10 all-time in career strikeout ratio.

== Career statistics ==
University of Washington
YEAR	W	L	GP	GS	CG	Sh	SV	IP	H	R	ER	BB	SO	ERA	WHIP
2006	23	16	45	35	29	9	2	257.2	170	70	53	76	387	1.44	0.95
2007	31	13	49	39	33	11	3	278.0	168	86	61	104	457	1.53	0.98
2009	42	8	52	50	46	21	0	352.2	165	60	49	76	521	0.97	0.68
2010	40	5	48	44	41	24	2	302.1	169	53	48	46	495	1.11	0.71
TOTALS	136	42	194	168	149	65	7	1190.2	672	269	211	302	1860	1.24	0.82

University of Washington
YEAR	G	AB	R	H	BA	RBI	HR	3B	2B	TB	SLG	BB	SO	SB	SBA
2006	45	38	2	9	.237	3	2	0	0	15	.394%	4	10	0	0
2007	54	149	15	43	.288	30	10	0	8	81	.543%	12	28	0	0
2009	56	112	16	30	.268	30	7	0	3	54	.482%	17	21	0	0
2010	59	169	33	53	.313	57	15	0	5	103	.609%	28	23	1	1
TOTALS	214	468	66	135	.288	120	34	0	16	253	.540%	61	82	1	1

=== NPF USSSA Pride & Canadian Wild ===
YEAR	W	L	GP	GS	CG	SHO	SV	IP	H	R	ER	BB	SO	ERA	WHIP
2010	4	2	8	8	6	2	0	50.0	57	25	23	17	39	3.22	1.48
2011	9	3	15	13	9	5	0	86.0	54	30	24	24	85	1.95	0.90
2012	8	2	12	11	7	1	0	70.0	59	37	29	20	88	2.90	1.13
2014	2	2	14	6	0	0	2	48.0	46	22	18	13	47	2.62	1.23
2019	2	2	9	7	2	1	2	39.2	32	14	12	8	29	2.14	1.02
TOTALS	25	11	58	45	24	9	4	293.2	248	128	106	82	288	2.53	1.12
