= 2013 National Pro Fastpitch season =

2013 NPF Season
- League: National Pro Fastpitch
- Sport: softball
- Duration: June 5, 2013 – August 18, 2013
- Number of teams: 4
- TV partner(s): ESPN

2013 NPF Draft
- Top draft pick: Rachele Fico P LSU
- Picked by: Akron Racers

Regular Season
- Ringor Cup (Best record): Chicago Bandits

Cowles Cup
- Champions: USSSA Pride
- Runners-up: Chicago Bandits
- Finals MVP: Cat Osterman; USSSA Pride

NPF seasons
- ← 2012 2014 →

The 2013 National Pro Fastpitch season was the 10th season of professional softball under the name National Pro Fastpitch (NPF) for the only professional women's softball league in the United States. From 1997 to 2002, NPF operated under the names Women's Pro Fastpitch (WPF) and Women's Pro Softball League (WPSL). Each year, the playoff teams battle for the Cowles Cup.

== Milestones and events ==
The Carolina Diamonds ceased operations after the 2012 season. NPF announced that an expansion team named the NY/NJ Comets would begin play in the 2013 season, with the Comets awarded the contracts of the Diamonds' players.

NPF reached a deal with ESPN to broadcast 16 games during the 2013 season.

=== Rule changes ===
After the 2012 NPF season ended without a champion, NPF instituted new procedures to name a champion if the Championship Series is not finished:

The creation of a policy and criteria, to award the Cowles Cup, in the event of inclement weather. That policy states a reserve day to play the Championships and also a tiered process for naming a champion if the Series cannot be finished. That policy is as follows:

- If no games have been played in the Final Series best of three - Championship is awarded to the highest seed
- If one game has been played in the Final Series best of three - Championship is awarded to the winner of game 1
- If two games have been played in the Final Series and each team has a loss - Championship is awarded to the team with the best win/loss head to head between the two competing teams during regular season league play. If that record is even, the Championship is awarded to the highest seed.

Other rule changes:

- Voted in favor of eliminating the international tie breaker in regular season play. (The tie breaker does not currently exist for Championship play either, so this move will essentially remove the tie breaker usage from NPF competition completely.)
- More clearly defined the Franchise Player Tag, making it permanent for the year it is designated. Once FPT is assigned to a player, it is exhausted for that particular year and cannot be changed or transferred. In the case of a trade, the FPT remains exhausted and cannot be reassigned to any other player(s).
- Voted in favor of changing the Draft order beginning in the 2014 Draft: Draft order will remain based on regular season finish of the previous year, but will alternate every other round from last place to first place in the opening round to first place to last place in the second round, and so on.
- Voted in favor of defining the penalty for passing a draft pick. The penalty for "passing" beginning in the 2013 Draft, will be loss of the offending team's first draft selection in the subsequent year.
- Voted to increase Team rights to drafted players. Rights to players will extend from the current policy to an additional year. Formerly, a Team held the rights to a drafted player until September 1 following the Draft. The new policy gives the team the right to a drafted player until a year from September 1 following the draft in which the player was chosen. Additionally, following that period, any team that picks up the drafted player, must compensate the drafting team an amount of $3,000.

== Teams, cities and stadiums ==
Team	City	Stadium
Akron Racers	Akron, Ohio	Firestone Stadium
Chicago Bandits	Rosemont, Illinois (Chicago Area)	Ballpark at Rosemont
NY/NJ Comets	Bridgewater, NJ	Various
USSSA Florida Pride	Kissimmee, Florida	Osceola County Stadium

National Pro Fastpitch teams

== Player acquisition ==
=== College draft ===
The 2013 NPF College Draft was held in Nashville, Tennessee on April 1 at 8:00 pm EST in Ford Theatre located in the Country Music Hall of Fame and Museum. Akron Racers selected pitcher Rachele Fico of LSU as the first overall pick.

=== Notable transactions ===
- Ayumi Karino became the first Japanese player in NPF history when she signed a contract with Akron Racers.

== League standings ==
Team	GP	W	L	Pct.	GB
Chicago Bandits	48	36	12	.750	-
USSSA Pride	48	34	14	.708	2
Akron Racers	48	16	32	.333	20
NY/NJ Comets	48	10	38	.208	26

== NPF Championship ==

Teams are seeded by the final standings. The third- and fourth-seeded teams play each other, with the winner advancing. The second seeded team plays the winner of game one. The top seed plays a best-of-three series against the winner of game two.

Game 1
4	NY/NJ Comets	2
3	Akron Racers	4

Game 2
2	USSSA Pride	2
3	Akron Racers	1

Best-of-3 Championship Series
1	Chicago Bandits	3
2	USSSA Pride	2

2013 NPF Championship Semifinals - Game One Akron Racers eliminate NY/NJ Comets
Date	Score	Location
August 22	Akron Racers 4, NY/NJ Comets 2	Rosemont, Illinois

2013 NPF Championship Semifinals - Game Two USSSA Pride eliminate Akron Racers
Date	Score	Location
August 23	USSSA Pride 2, Akron Racers 1	Rosemont, Illinois

2013 NPF Championship Series USSSA Pride defeat Chicago Bandits 2–1
Game	Date	Score	Series (CHI-USSSA)	Location
1	August 23	Chicago Bandits 3, USSSA Pride 2	1–0	Rosemont, Illinois
2	August 24	Chicago Bandits 0, USSSA Pride 5	1–1	Rosemont, Illinois
3	August 24	Chicago Bandits 1, USSSA Pride 2	1–2	Rosemont, Illinois

=== Championship Game ===
Team	Top Batter	Stats.
USSSA Pride	Kristyn Sandberg	3-3 RBI 22Bs
Chicago Bandits	Alisa Goler	1-3 RBI

Team	Pitcher	IP	H	R	ER	BB	SO
USSSA Pride	Keilani Ricketts (W)	4.2	3	1	1	3	8
USSSA Pride	Cat Osterman (SV)	2.1	1	0	0	0	2
Chicago Bandits	Monica Abbott (L)	7.0	7	2	2	0	9

2013 NPF Championship Series MVP
Player	Club	Stats.
Cat Osterman	USSSA Pride	2-0 21Ks 0.00 ERA SH SV 0.87 WHIP (7Hs+7BBs/16.0 IP)

== Annual awards ==
Award	Player	Team	Stat
Player of the Year Award	Megan Wiggins	Chicago Bandits	.433 BA, led league with 11 HR, .780 SLG, .532 OBP, and 1.312 OPS
Pitcher of the Year	Cat Osterman	USSSA Pride	234 K, 1.06 ERA, 17-4
Rookie of the Year	Andi Williamson	Chicago Bandits	1.67 ERA, 9 wins
Defensive Player of the Year	Ashley Charters	USSSA Pride	Zero errors, 58 put-outs and 61 assists
Offensive Player of the Year (tie)	Megan Wiggins	Chicago Bandits	
Offensive Player of the Year (tie)	Gionna DiSalvatore	USSSA Pride	
Home Run Award	Megan Wiggins	Chicago Bandits	11 HR
Diamond Spike Award (Note: The Diamond Spike Award is given to the player with the most stolen bases)	Caitlin Lowe	USSSA Pride	16 SB
Coaching Staff of the Year	Chicago Bandits -- Mike Steurwald (HEAD COACH) and Jimmy Kolatis (ASSISTANT COACH)		
Jennie Finch Award (Note: The Jennie Finch award is given to the player who best exemplifies the character and qualities of its famous namesake, and who is considered to positively impact the game both on and off the field.)	Vicky Galindo	Chicago Bandits	

== Award notes ==
2013 All-NPF Team
Position	Name	Team
Pitcher	Cat Osterman	USSSA Pride
Pitcher	Monica Abbott	Chicago Bandits
Pitcher	Michelle Gascoigne	Chicago Bandits
Pitcher	Andi Williamson	Chicago Bandits
Catcher	Kaylyn Castillo	Akron Racers
1st Base	Gionna DiSalvatore	USSSA Pride
2nd Base	Ashley Charters	USSSA Pride
3rd Base	Andrea Duran	USSSA Pride
Shortstop (tie)	Natasha Watley	USSSA Pride
Shortstop (tie)	Tammy Williams	Chicago Bandits
Outfield	Megan Wiggins	Chicago Bandits
Outfield	Caitlin Lowe	Chicago Bandits
Outfield	Kelly Kretschman	USSSA Pride
At-Large	Charlotte Morgan	Akron Racers
At-Large	Vicky Galindo	Chicago Bandits
At-Large	Kimi Pohlman	Chicago Bandits
At-Large	Kristen Butler	Chicago Bandits
At-Large	Sarah Pauly	USSSA Pride
At-Large	Olivia Galati	NY/NJ Comets

NPF Championship Series MVP
Player	Club	Record
Cat Osterman	USSSA Pride	2nd Championship Series MVP for Osterman

== See also ==
- List of professional sports leagues
- List of professional sports teams in the United States and Canada
