= 2009 NPF Draft =

General information
- Sport: softball
- Date(s): February 17, 2009
- Time: 7:00 PM EST
- Location: Uniontown, OH

Overview
- 25 total selections
- League: National Pro Fastpitch
- Teams: 5
- First selection: Kaitlin Cochran OF Arizona State selected by Akron Racers
- Most selections: Akron Racers, 8 picks
- Fewest selections: Washington Glory, 3 picks

The 2009 NPF Senior Draft is the sixth annual NPF Draft. It was held February 17, 2009 7:00 PM EST, hosted by the Akron Racers at the Cambria Suites Akron-Canton Airport location for the 2009 season. It was streamed live on TheSoftballChannel.com. The first selection was Arizona State's Kaitlin Cochran, picked by the Akron Racers.Athletes are not allowed by the NCAA to sign professional contracts until their collegiate seasons have ended.

After the draft, but before the season began, the Washington Glory ceased operations for financial reasons. Subsequently, NPF and United States Specialty Sports Association(USSSA) began a partnership, which resulted in the expansion team USSSA Pride inheriting the Glory's player contracts and draft choices.

== 2009 NPF Draft ==
Following are the 25 selections from the 2009 NPF Senior Draft:

Position key:
C = Catcher; UT = Utility infielder; INF = Infielder; 1B = First base; 2B =Second base SS = Shortstop; 3B = Third base; OF = Outfielder; RF = Right field; CF = Center field; LF = Left field; P = Pitcher; RHP = right-handed Pitcher; LHP = left-handed Pitcher; DP =Designated player
Positions are listed as combined for those who can play multiple positions.

^{+}	Denotes player who has been selected to at least one All-NPF team
^{#}	Denotes player who has not played in the NPF

=== Round 1 ===
Pick	Player	Pos.	NPF Team	College
1	Kaitlin Cochran	OF	Akron Racers	Arizona State
2	DJ Mathis^{#}	P	Akron Racers	Oklahoma
3	Laurie Wagner	OF	Rockford Thunder	Houston
4	Brette Reagan	INF	Philadelphia Force	Baylor
5	Brandice Balschmiter^{#}	P	Chicago Bandits	UMass

=== Round 2 ===
Pick	Player	Pos.	NPF Team	College
6	Jenae Leles	INF	Rockford Thunder	Arizona
7	Brittany Weil	P	Akron Racers	Iowa
8	Kim Waleszonia^{#}	OF	Washington Glory	Florida
9	Lillian Hammond	OF	Philadelphia Force	Tennessee
10	Tammy Williams^{+}	INF	Chicago Bandits	Northwestern

=== Round 3 ===
Pick	Player	Pos.	NPF Team	College
11	Ashley Charters^{+}	INF	Rockford Thunder	Washington
12	Samantha Ricketts	INF	Akron Racers	Oklahoma
13	Stacey Nelson^{#}	P	Washington Glory	Florida
14	Jamie Schloredt	C	Chicago Bandits	Sacramento State
15	Jessica Valis^{+}	INF	Chicago Bandits	Houston

=== Round 4 ===
Pick	Player	Pos.	NPF Team	College
16	Danielle Kinley	OF	Philadelphia Force	Penn State
17	Melissa Pura^{#}	INF	Akron Racers	Cal Poly
18	Micaela Minner	UT	Akron Racers	Missouri
19	Sari-Jane Jenkins	OF	Akron Racers	Oregon
20"	Amber Patton^{+}	INF	Chicago Bandits	DePaul

=== Round 5 ===
Pick	Player	Pos.	NPF Team	College
21	Ashley Holcombe	C	Rockford Thunder	Alabama
22	Missy Penna^{#}	P	Akron Racers	Stanford
23	Maddy Coon^{#}	INF	Washington Glory	Stanford
24	Breanna Brown^{#}	OF	Rockford Thunder	North Carolina
25	Izmena Cabrera^{#}	OF	Chicago Bandits	Sacramento State
