= 2010 NPF Draft =

General information
- Sport: Softball
- Date: February 10, 2010
- Time: 8:00 PM ET
- Location: Kissimmee, FL

Overview
- 20 total selections
- League: National Pro Fastpitch
- Teams: 4
- First selection: Charlotte Morgan UT Alabama selected by USSSA Florida Pride
- Most selections: Chicago Bandits, 6 picks
- Fewest selections: Akron Racers, 4 picks

The 2010 NPF Senior Draft is the seventh annual NPF Draft. It was held February 10, 2010 8:00 pm EST in Kissimmee, FL at the Hermitage Key Resort for the 2010 season. It was streamed live on the Major League Baseball's website MLB.com. The first selection was Alabama's Charlotte Morgan, picked by the USSSA Florida Pride. Athletes are not allowed by the NCAA to sign professional contracts until their collegiate seasons have ended.

== 2010 NPF Draft ==
Position key:
C = Catcher; UT = Utility infielder; INF = Infielder; 1B = First base; 2B =Second base SS = Shortstop; 3B = Third base; OF = Outfielder; RF = Right field; CF = Center field; LF = Left field; P = Pitcher; RHP = right-handed Pitcher; LHP = left-handed Pitcher; DP =Designated player
Positions are listed as combined for those who can play multiple positions.

^{+}	Denotes player who has been selected to at least one All-NPF team
^{#}	Denotes player who has not played in the NPF

=== Round 1 ===
Pick	Player	Pos.	NPF Team	College
1	Charlotte Morgan^{+}	UT	USSSA Florida Pride	Alabama
2	Molly Johnson^{#}	UT	Tennessee Diamonds	Kentucky
3	Melissa Roth	C	USSSA Florida Pride	Louisville
4	Nikki Nemetz	P	Chicago Bandits	Michigan

=== Round 2 ===
Pick	Player	Pos.	NPF Team	College
5	Amber Flores	UT	USSSA Florida Pride	Oklahoma
6	Becca Heteniak	P	Tennessee Diamonds	DePaul
7	Sam Marder^{+}	C	Akron Racers	Ohio State
8	Amberly Waits	SS	Chicago Bandits	Louisiana Tech

=== Round 3 ===
Pick	Player	Pos.	NPF Team	College
9	Francesca Enea	OF	USSSA Florida Pride	Florida
10	Loryn Johnson	INF	Tennessee Diamonds	Texas
11	Megan Langenfeld^{#}	P/1B	Akron Racers	UCLA
12	Neena Bryant	OF	Chicago Bandits	Oregon

=== Round 4 ===
Pick	Player	Pos.	NPF Team	College
13	Alissa Haber	OF	USSSA Florida Pride	Stanford
14	Carly Wynn	OF	Tennessee Diamonds	Florida State
15	Rachel Mitchell	OF	Chicago Bandits	LSU
16	Christine Knauer	SS	Chicago Bandits	North Carolina

=== Round 5 ===
Pick	Player	Pos.	NPF Team	College
17	Liane Horiuchi	SS	Akron Racers	Purdue
18	Kristen Wadwell^{#}	P	Tennessee Diamonds	Louisville
19	Kaila Shull	C	Akron Racers	UCLA
20	Angela Findlay	OF	Chicago Bandits	Michigan
