= 2011 National Pro Fastpitch season =

2011 NPF Season
- League: National Pro Fastpitch
- Sport: softball
- Duration: June 9, 2011 – August 14, 2011
- Teams: 4
- TV partner: ESPN

2011 NPF Draft
- Top draft pick: Kelsi Dunne P Alabama
- Picked by: NPF Diamonds

Regular Season
- Ringor Cup (Best record): USSSA Pride

Cowles Cup
- Champions: Chicago Bandits
- Runners-up: USSSA Pride
- Finals MVP: Monica Abbott; Chicago Bandits

NPF seasons
- 2010 2012

The 2011 National Pro Fastpitch season was the eighth season of professional softball under the name National Pro Fastpitch (NPF) for the only professional women's softball league in the United States. From 1997 to 2002, NPF operated under the names Women's Pro Fastpitch (WPF) and Women's Pro Softball League (WPSL). Each year, the playoff teams battle for the Cowles Cup.

== Teams, cities and stadiums ==
Team	City	Stadium
Akron Racers	Akron, Ohio	Firestone Stadium
Chicago Bandits	Rosemont, Illinois (Chicago Area)	Ballpark at Rosemont
NPF Diamonds	Nashville, Tennessee	Various
USSSA Florida Pride	Kissimmee, Florida	Osceola County Stadium and Champion Stadium

National Pro Fastpitch teams

== Milestones and events ==
The Tennessee Diamonds were rebranded as the NPF Diamonds for the 2011 season. The Diamonds were a "traveling team," playing each of their five 'home stands' at five different venues, from Calgary, Alberta to Lexington, North Carolina.

Akron Racers named as their coach Jake Schumann, who was also with Texas A&M-Corpus Christi softball coach.

NPF Diamonds signed Tim Kiernan as head coach. Kiernan had previously coached professional softball with WPSL's Virginia Roadsters in 1999, NPF Tour Teams in 2001 and 2003, and the Sacramento Sunbirds in 2004.

The Chicago Bandits moved into their new stadium Ballpark at Rosemont. It is the first ballpark specifically built for a women's professional softball team, and its address, 27 Jennie Finch Way, pays tribute to one of their most famous players.

== Player acquisition ==
=== College draft ===
The 2011 NPF Senior Draft was held March 16, 2011, in Amway Center in Orlando, Florida. The NPF Draft was broadcast on MLB.com. NPF Diamonds selected pitcher Kelsi Dunne of Alabama as the first overall pick.

== League standings ==
Team	GP	W	L	Pct.	GB
USSSA Pride	39	30	9	.769	-
Akron Racers	39	22	17	.564	8
Chicago Bandits	40	20	20	.500	10.5
NPF Diamonds	38	6	32	.158	23.5

== NPF Championship ==

The 2011 NPF Championship Series was held at McMurry Park in Sulphur, Louisiana August 18–21. All four teams qualify and were seeded based on the final standings. The first seed played the fourth seed on a best-of-three series, and the second seed played the third seed in another best-of-three series. The winners played each other in a best-of-three series that determined the champion.

The games were broadcast on ESPN2, with color analysis by former NPF player and two-time Olympian Jennie Finch and three-time Olympian Leah O'Brien-Amico. Bernie Guenther called the play-by-play.

NPF Semifinals (Best-of-3)
1	USSSA Pride	2
4	NPF Diamonds	0
2	Akron Racers	0
3	Chicago Bandits	2

NPF Championship (Best-of-3)
1	USSSA Pride	0
3	Chicago Bandits	2

2011 NPF Semifinals Chicago Bandits defeat Akron Racers 2-0
Game	Date	Score	Series (CHI-AKR)	Location
1	August 18	Chicago Bandits 8, Akron Racers 1	1-0	Sulphur, Louisiana
2	August 19	Chicago Bandits 7, Akron Racers 4	2-0	Sulphur, Louisiana

2011 NPF Semifinals USSSA Pride defeat NPF Diamonds 2–0
Game	Date	Score	Series (USSA-NPF)	Location
1	August 18 and 19	USSSA Pride 8, NPF Diamonds 7	1-0	Sulphur, Louisiana
2	August 19	USSSA Pride 7, NPF Diamonds 0	2-0	Sulphur, Louisiana

2011 NPF Championship Series Chicago Bandits defeat USSSA Pride 2-0
Game	Date	Score	Series (CHI-USSSA)	Location
1	August 20	Chicago Bandits 4, USSSA Pride 3, (8 innings)	1-0	Sulphur, Louisiana
2	August 21	Chicago Bandits 10, USSSA Pride 3	2-0	Sulphur, Louisiana

=== Championship Game ===
Team	Top Batter	Stats.
Chicago Bandits	Nikki Nemitz	2-4 3RBIs 2B
USSSA Pride	Natasha Watley	2-4 2RBIs

Team	Pitcher	IP	H	R	ER	BB	SO
Chicago Bandits	Monica Abbott (W)	7.0	5	3	3	3	5
USSSA Pride	Jordan Taylor (L)	0.1	3	5	4	1	0
USSSA Pride	Sarah Pauly	2.2	4	3	3	1	0
USSSA Pride	Danielle Lawrie	3.0	0	2	0	0	0

2011 NPF Championship Series MVP
Player	Club	Stats.
Monica Abbott	Chicago Bandits	3-0 30Ks 2.17 ERA SV 0.79 WHIP (16Hs+7BBs/29.0 IP)

== Annual awards ==
Ringor Cup
(Best regular season record)
USSSA Pride

Award	Player	Team
Player of the Year Award	Jessica Mendoza	USSSA Pride
Pitcher of the Year (tie)	Monica Abbott	Chicago Bandits
Pitcher of the Year (tie)	Cat Osterman	USSSA Pride
Rookie of the Year	Alisa Goler	Chicago Bandits
Defensive Player of the Year	Bianca Mejia	NPF Diamonds
Offensive Player of the Year	Natasha Watley	USSSA Pride
Home Run Award	Alisa Goler	Chicago Bandits
Diamond Spike Award (Note: The Diamond Spike Award is given to the player with the most stolen bases)	Natasha Watley	USSSA Pride
Coaching Staff of the Year	USSSA Pride -- Tim Walton (HEAD COACH) and Beth Torina (ASSISTANT COACH)	
Jennie Finch Award (Note: The Jennie Finch award is given to the player who best exemplifies the character and qualities of its famous namesake, and who is considered to positively impact the game both on and off the field.)	Jessica Mendoza	USSSA Pride

== Award notes ==
2011 All-NPF Team
Position	Name	Team
Pitcher	Monica Abbott	Chicago Bandits
Pitcher	Cat Osterman	USSSA Pride
Pitcher	Kristina Thorson	Akron Racers
Pitcher	Danielle Lawrie	USSSA Pride
Catcher	Samantha Marder	Akron Racers
1st Base	Nicole Trimboli	Akron Racers
2nd Base	Ashley Charters	USSSA Pride
3rd Base	Andrea Duran	USSSA Pride
Shortstop	Natasha Watley	USSSA Pride
Outfield	Megan Wiggins	Chicago Bandits
Outfield	Jessica Mendoza	USSSA Pride
Outfield	Alyssa Haber	USSSA Pride
At-Large	Danielle Zymkowitz	Chicago Bandits
At-Large	Shannon Doepking	Chicago Bandits
At-Large	Brittany McKinney	NPF Diamonds
At-Large	Charlotte Morgan	USSSA Pride
At-Large	Bianca Mejia	NPF Diamonds

== See also ==
- List of professional sports leagues
- List of professional sports teams in the United States and Canada
