= 2011 NPF Draft =

General information
- Sport: Softball
- Date(s): March 18, 2011
- Time: 8:00 ET
- Location: Orlando, Florida

Overview
- 20 total selections
- League: National Pro Fastpitch
- Teams: 4
- First selection: Kelsi Dunne P Alabama selected by NPF Diamonds
- Most selections: NPF Diamonds, 7 picks
- Fewest selections: USSSA Pride, 3 picks

The 2011 NPF Draft is the eighth annual NPF Draft. It was held March 18, 2011 8:00 pm EST in Orlando, FL at the Amway Center for the 2011 season. It was streamed live on the Major League Baseball's website MLB.com. The first selection was Alabama's Kelsi Dunne, picked by the NPF Diamonds. Athletes are not allowed by the NCAA to sign professional contracts until their collegiate seasons have ended.

== 2011 NPF Draft ==
Position key:
C = Catcher; UT = Utility infielder; INF = Infielder; 1B = First base; 2B =Second base SS = Shortstop; 3B = Third base; OF = Outfielder; RF = Right field; CF = Center field; LF = Left field; P = Pitcher; RHP = right-handed Pitcher; LHP = left-handed Pitcher; DP =Designated player
Positions are listed as combined for those who can play multiple positions.

^{+}	Denotes player who has been selected to at least one All-NPF team
^{#}	Denotes player who has not played in the NPF

=== Round 1 ===
Pick	Player	Pos.	NPF Team	College
1	Kelsi Dunne	P	NPF Diamonds	Alabama
2	Taylor Schlopy^{+}	OF	Akron Racers	Georgia
3	Jenn Salling	SS	USSSA Florida Pride	Washington
4	Dorian Shaw	1B	Chicago Bandits	Michigan

=== Round 2 ===
Pick	Player	Pos.	NPF Team	College
5	Kelsey Bruder	OF	USSSA Florida Pride (Note: 2011 Trade with NPF Diamonds)	Florida
6	Megan Bush	UT	Akron Racers	Florida
7	Morgan Melloh	P	NPF Diamonds (Note: 2011 Trade with USSSA Florida Pride)	Indiana
8	Megan Wiggins^{+}	OF	Chicago Bandits	Georgia

=== Round 3 ===
Pick	Player	Pos.	NPF Team	College
9	Megan Yocke^{#}	C	NPF Diamonds	Kentucky
10	Toni Paisley	P	Akron Racers	East Carolina
11	Jordan Taylor^{+}	P	USSSA Florida Pride	Michigan
12	Alisa Goler^{+}	IF	Chicago Bandits	Georgia

=== Round 4 ===
Pick	Player	Pos.	NPF Team	College
13	Whitney Larsen	UT	NPF Diamonds	Alabama
14	Morgan Childers	RHP	Akron Racers	South Carolina Upstate
15	Brittany Hile	C	NPF Diamonds (Note: Draft Day Trade with USSSA Florida Pride)	Kansas
16	Kristin Shifflett	SS/2B	Chicago Bandits	Radford

=== Round 5 ===
Pick	Player	Pos.	NPF Team	College
17	Aja Paculba	2B	NPF Diamonds	Florida
18	Kelly Grieve^{#}	OF	Akron Racers (Note: Draft Day Trade with USSSA Florida Pride)	Tennessee
19	Rhiannon Kliesing	P/1B	NPF Diamonds	Texas A&M
20	Kara Nelson^{#}	2B	Chicago Bandits	Illinois State
