= 2012 National Pro Fastpitch season =

2012 NPF Season
- League: National Pro Fastpitch
- Sport: softball
- Duration: June 7, 2012 – August 19, 2012
- Teams: 4

2012 NPF Draft
- Top draft pick: Brittany Mack; LSU
- Picked by: USSSA Pride

Regular Season
- Ringor Cup: USSSA Pride

Cowles Cup
- Champions: No champion named

NPF seasons
- 2011 2013

The 2012 National Pro Fastpitch season was the ninth season of professional softball under the name National Pro Fastpitch (NPF) for the only professional women's softball league in the United States. From 1997 to 2002, NPF operated under the names Women's Pro Fastpitch (WPF) and Women's Pro Softball League (WPSL). The 2012 season is especially notable because due to weather and scheduling issues, the NPF Championship Series was not completed and no Cowles Cup champion was named.

== Milestones and events ==
NPF announced the Carolina Diamonds as a new team for the 2012 season, owned by Amelia Nemeth and husband Alan Demaske. Carolina replaced the NPF Diamonds, a travelling team operated by NPF. The team was headquartered in Charlotte, North Carolina and played its home games in various venues throughout the Carolinas.

== Teams, cities and stadiums ==
Team	City	Stadium
Akron Racers	Akron, Ohio	Firestone Stadium
Carolina Diamonds	Charlotte, North Carolina	Various
Chicago Bandits	Rosemont, Illinois (Chicago Area)	Ballpark at Rosemont
USSSA Pride	Kissimmee, Florida	Osceola County Stadium and Champion Stadium

National Pro Fastpitch teams

== Player acquisition ==
=== College draft ===
The 2012 NPF College Draft was held in the Peabody Hotel in Memphis, Tennessee on March 7 at 5:00 CST. USSSA Pride selected pitcher Brittany Mack of LSU as the first overall pick.

== League standings ==
Team	GP	W	L	Pct.	GB
USSSA Pride	43	31	12	.721	-
Chicago Bandits	44	25	19	.568	6.5
Carolina Diamonds	43	17	26	.395	14
Akron Racers	44	14	30	.318	17.5

== NPF Championship ==

With only four teams in the league, every team qualified for the postseason. Teams are seeded by the final standings. No. 1 seed USSSA Pride faced No. 4 seed Akron Racers in one best-of-three semifinal series, while the No. 2 seed Chicago Bandits faced the No. 3 seed Carolina Diamonds in another. The winners were scheduled to advance to the best-of-three championship series.

After winning their semifinal series, the Bandits and Pride played the first game of the championship series, with the Bandits winning 2-1.

On Sunday August 26, the start of game was delayed for hours due to rain. After one out in the first inning, the field was deemed unplayable, and the game was cancelled. No makeup game was scheduled and the series was ended without naming a champion.

Conflicting comments were made regarding the possibility of finishing the series on Monday. Citing owners' costs and players' travel obligations, NPF commissioner Cheri Kempf said that "The Bandits had six players that could not change plans, including [starting pitcher] Monica Abbott going to Japan" and,"I can say that the championship wasn't complete, and it wasn't complete because Chicago stated it had six players that could not finish. So therefore, I don't feel like that the right thing to do is to award the championship on one game." However, Bandits owner Bill Sokolis said,"We could have put nine players on the field,". On her blog Monica Abbott wrote that no one asked her to change her flight to Japan, but that she "would have done so in a heartbeat."

NPF announced that a committee would be formed to make recommendations to avoid unfinished championships in the future.

NPF Semifinals (Best-of-3)
1	USSSA Pride	2
4	Akron Racers	1
2	Chicago Bandits	2
3	Carolina Diamonds	0

NPF Championship (Best-of-3)
1	USSSA Pride	0
2	Chicago Bandits	1

2012 NPF Semifinals Chicago Bandits defeat Akron Racers 2-0
Game	Date	Score	Series (CHI-CAR)	Location
1	August 23	Chicago Bandits 11, Carolina Diamonds 1	1-0	Rosemont, Illinois
2	August 24	Chicago Bandits 5, Carolina Diamonds 1	1-0	Rosemont, Illinois

2012 NPF Semifinals USSSA Pride defeat Akron Racers 2–1
Game	Date	Score	Series (USSA-AKR)	Location
1	August 23	USSSA Pride 4, Akron Racers 1	1-0	Rosemont, Illinois
2	August 24	USSSA Pride 7, Akron Racers 8	1-1	Rosemont, Illinois
3	August 25	USSSA Pride 9, Akron Racers 7	2-1	Rosemont, Illinois

2012 NPF Championship Series Incomplete
Game	Date	Score	Series (CHI-USSSA)	Location
1	August 25	Chicago Bandits 2, USSSA Pride 1	1-0	Rosemont, Illinois

== Annual awards ==
On August 22 NPF hosted a banquet in Rosemont, Illinois, at which the league's annual awards were announced and the All-NPF Team was named:

Ringor Cup
(Best regular season record)
USSSA Pride

Award	Player	Team	Stat
Player of the Year Award	Caitlin Lowe	USSSA Pride	.440 Avg., 51 H, .496 OBP, .509 SLG
Pitcher of the Year	Monica Abbott	Chicago Bandits	14-3, 125.2 IP, 4 SV, 190 K (all led NPF), 1.06 ERA(2nd in NPF), 2 no-hitters
Rookie of the Year	Kristyn Sandberg	USSSA Pride	.355 average(4th in League), 33 RBI (1st), .504 OBP (2nd), .624 SLG (2nd)
Defensive Player of the Year (tie)	Amber Patton	Chicago Bandits	1 error, .991 Fielding Percentage
Defensive Player of the Year (tie)	Kelley Montalvo	Akron Racers	3 errors, .978 Fielding Percentage
Offensive Player of the Year	Sam Marder	Akron Racers	.343 Avg., 36 H, 8 HR, 27 RBI, 24 BB. 5th or better in 7 different offensive categories.
Home Run Award	Megan Wiggins	Chicago Bandits	12 HR
Diamond Spikes Award (tie) (Note: The Diamond Spikes Award is given to the player(s) with the most stolen bases)	Sharonda McDonald	Akron Racers	13 SB for each player
Diamond Spikes Award (tie)	Amber Patton	Chicago Bandits	13 SB for each player
Coaching Staff of the Year	Carolina Diamonds -- Lisa Navas–Head Coach, Miranda Ervin–Assistant Coach, Lisa Dodd–Assistant Coach		
Jennie Finch Award (Note: The Jennie Finch Award is awarded to the player who shows excellence in sportsmanship, leadership and humility both on and off the field.)	Natasha Watley	USSSA Pride	

== Award notes ==
2012 All-NPF Team
Position	Name	Team
Pitcher	Cat Osterman	USSSA Pride
Pitcher	Monica Abbott	Chicago Bandits
Pitcher	Michelle Gascoigne	Chicago Bandits
Pitcher	Andi Williamson	Chicago Bandits
Catcher	Rachel Folden	Carolina Diamonds
1st Base	GiOnna DiSalvatore	Carolina Diamonds
2nd Base	Ashley Charters	USSSA Pride
3rd Base	Amber Patton	Chicago Bandits
Shortstop	Natasha Watley	USSSA Pride
Outfield	Megan Wiggins	Chicago Bandits
Outfield	Caitlin Lowe	USSSA Pride
Outfield	Sharonda McDonald	Akron Racers
At-Large	Sam Marder	Akron Racers
At-Large	Vicky Galindo	Chicago Bandits
At-Large	Jessica Mendoza	USSSA Pride
At-Large	Bianca Mejia	Carolina Diamonds
At-Large	Kelly Kretschman	USSSA Pride
At-Large	Nicole Pauly	Akron Racers

== See also ==
- List of professional sports leagues
- List of professional sports teams in the United States and Canada
