= Brianna Hesson =

American softball coach and player

Biographical details
- Born: September 13, 1988 (age 38); Lawrenceville, Georgia

Playing career
- 2008–2011: Georgia
- 2011: NPF Diamonds
- 2012–2013: Akron Racers
- Positions: First baseman, outfielder

Coaching career (HC unless noted)
- 2013–2016: Auburn (GA)
- 2017: IUPUI (Asst)
- 2018: Louisville (Asst)
- 2019, 2022–2023: Austin Peay (Asst)

Accomplishments and honors

Awards
- 2× Second Team All-SEC (2009, 2011); 2× All-SEC Defensive Team (2010, 2011)

Brianna Hesson (born September 13, 1988) is an American softball coach and former first baseman and outfielder. She played college softball at Georgia from 2008 to 2011. She played in the National Pro Fastpitch from 3 seasons from 2011 to 2013 with her longest tenure as a player with the Akron Racers.

Hesson was born in Lawrenceville, Georgia. She attended North Gwinnett High School in Suwanee, Georgia. After graduation from high school in 2007, Hesson enrolled at the University of Georgia and played first base and outfield for the Bulldogs, starting for four seasons. As a sophomore in 2009, and as a junior in 2010 she led Georgia to the Women's College World Series, finishing third both times.

The NFP Diamonds signed Hesson as an undrafted free agent in 2011. She played 3 years as a first baseman in the NFP, with the Diamonds in 2011 and the Akron Racers in 2012 to 2013.

== Playing career ==
Hesson grew up in Sugar Hill, Georgia, where he attended North Gwinnett High School. Her stellar high school career led to her being inducted into the North Gwinnett Athletic Hall of Fame in 2013. Hesson would go on to play college softball for the Georgia Bulldogs, playing as a first baseman and outfielder. As a freshman in 2008, Hesson had a .237 batting average, a .311 on-base percentage (OBP), and a .304 SLG, with sixteen RBI. As a sophomore in 2009, she batted .348 with a .646 SLG, 17 doubles, 10 home runs and 43 RBI, leading to her being named 2nd Team All-Southeastern Conference (SEC). Her efforts helped lead the Bulldogs to their first ever Women's College World Series appearance in school history. During Game 9 of the WCWS against Michigan, Hesson was one of 3 Bulldogs to hit a home run, for a total of 4, a WCWS record. As a junior in 2010, she batted .321 with a .632 SLG, 13 home runs, and 58 RBIs, while also being named to the SEC All-Defensive team. One of the highlights of her junior year included a 8 RBI weekend in a three-game sweep of No. 2 Florida, culminating in her awarding of the USA Softball collegiate player of the week. Hesson's single in the second round of the 2010 Women's College World Series, would help the Bulldogs eliminate rival Florida, and propelled them into the semifinal round. As a senior in 2011, she batted .335 while posting career highs with 15 home runs and 64 RBI. She was once again named to the Second Team All-SEC and the All-SEC Defensive team.

Following the conclusion of her collegiate career, Hesson signed with the NPF Diamonds of National Pro Fastpitch (NPF). On June 9, 2011, she made her debut at Firestone Stadium, going 1-for-2 with an RBI. Hesson hit her first NPF home run on June 12, off Akron Racers' Morgan Childers. Her second home run came two days later at Fortune Road Athletic Complex against the Racers off Lisa Norris. Hesson finished her rookie season with a .181 batting average, two home runs, 6 RBIs, and 7 walks. On February 29, 2012, Hesson signed with the Akron Racers as a free agent. Hesson earned a regular role with the Racers, playing both first base and right field. On July 24, 2012, she posted a career high in home runs (2), RBI (4) and TB (8), during a 5–3 victory over the Brakettes. Finishing the regular season with a .293 average, 5 home runs, and 20 RBIs, the Racers came in last place in the NPF, but earned their fourth consecutive appearance in the postseason. The Racers were defeated by the USSSA Pride in the NPF Semifinals, with Hesson batting .250 in the series without a home run or an RBI. She returned to the Racers in 2013, appearing in 19 games, with a .214 average, 0 home runs, and 3 RBI.

=== Career statistics ===
Year	Age	Team	G	PA	AB	R	H	2B	3B	HR	RBI	SB	BB	SO	BA	OBP	SLG	OPS	TB
2011	22	NPF Diamonds	36	112	105	10	19	2	0	2	6	0	7	33	.181	.232	.257	.489	27
2012	23	Akron Racers	41	114	99	16	29	7	1	5	20	0	15	23	.293	.386	.535	.921	53
2013	24	Akron Racers	19	59	56	5	12	3	0	0	3	0	3	15	.214	.254	.268	.522	18
Career			96	285	260	31	60	12	1	7	29	0	25	71	.231	.298	.365	.663	98

== Coaching career ==
Hesson began her coaching career from 2013 to 2016 as a graduate assistant for the Auburn Tigers. During her final season, the Tigers clinched their first ever Women's College World Series, finishing as the national runner up. In the fall of 2016, she joined the coaching staff of the IUPUI Jaguars as an assistant. The Jaguars completed the regular season as Summit League champions, but were upset in the conference tournament. The following season, she joined the Louisville Cardinals as a volunteer assistant. Hesson joined the Austin Peay Governors staff for the 2019 season, helping them to a third-place finish in the Ohio Valley Conference. After not coaching for two seasons, Hesson returned to the Governors staff in 2022.
