= 2009 National Pro Fastpitch season =

2009 NPF Season
- League: National Pro Fastpitch
- Sport: softball
- Duration: June 3, 2009 – August 16, 2009
- Number of teams: 5

2009 NPF Draft
- Top draft pick: Kaitlin Cochran; Arizona State
- Picked by: Akron Racers

Regular Season
- Majestic Cup (Best record): Chicago Bandits

Cowles Cup
- Champions: Rockford Thunder
- Runners-up: USSSA Pride
- Finals MVP: Cat Osterman; Rockford Thunder

NPF seasons
- ← 2008 2010 →

The 2009 National Pro Fastpitch season was the sixth season of professional softball under the name National Pro Fastpitch (NPF) for the only professional women's fastpitch softball league in the United States. From 1997 to 2002, NPF operated under the names Women's Pro Fastpitch (WPF) and Women's Pro Softball League (WPSL). Each year, the playoff teams battle for the Cowles Cup.

== Teams, cities and stadiums ==
Team	City	Stadium
Akron Racers	Akron, Ohio	Firestone Stadium
Chicago Bandits	Elgin, Illinois (Chicago Area)	Judson University
Philadelphia Force	Allentown, Pennsylvania	ECTB Stadium
Rockford Thunder	Roscoe, Illinois	Thunder Park
USSSA Florida Pride	Kissimmee, Florida	Osceola County High School Stadium

National Pro Fastpitch teams

== Milestones and events ==
In November 2008, the Rockford Thunder named as field manager James Sherwood, who replaced Javier Vela. Vela resigned after four seasons.

Akron Racers named a new field manager, Barb Sherwood, who replaced Shonda Stanton.

Before the 2009 season, Washington Glory ceased operations for financial reasons. Subsequently, NPF and United States Specialty Sports Association(USSSA) began a partnership, which resulted in the expansion team USSSA Pride inheriting the Glory's player contracts. The Pride named J.Y. Davis and Margaret Davis as coaches.

== Player acquisition ==
=== College draft ===
The 2009 NPF Senior Draft was held February 10, 2009, at the Cambria Suites Akron-Canton Airport location. Three-time First-Team All-American outfielder Kaitlin Cochran of Arizona State was selected first by the Akron Racers, after a draft-day trade.

== League standings ==
Team	GP	W	L	Pct.	GB
Chicago Bandits	39	27	12	.692	-
Akron Racers	40	26	14	.650	1.5
Rockford Thunder	40	19	21	.475	8.5
USSSA Pride	40	16	24	.400	11.5
Philadelphia Force	39	11	28	.282	15

== NPF Championship ==

The 2009 NPF Championship Series was held at Firestone Stadium in Akron, Ohio August 19–23. The top four teams qualified and were seeded based on the final standings. The first seed played the fourth seed on a best-of-three series, and the second seed played the third seed in another best-of-three series. The winners played each other in a best-of-three series that determined the champion. Day one of play was rained out, forcing the four teams to play doubleheaders on day two, August 21.

NPF Semifinals (Best-of-3)
1	Chicago Bandits	1
4	USSSA Pride	2
2	Akron Racers	1
3	Rockford Thunder	2

NPF Championship (Best-of-3)
4	USSSA Pride	1
3	Rockford Thunder	2

2009 NPF Semifinals USSSA Pride defeat Chicago Bandits 2-1
Game	Date	Score	Series (CHI-USSSA)	Location
1	August 21	Chicago Bandits 1, USSSA Pride 0	1-0	Akron, Ohio
2	August 21	Chicago Bandits 1, USSSA Pride 2	1-1	Akron, Ohio
3	August 22	Chicago Bandits 0, USSSA Pride 2	1-2	Akron, Ohio

2009 NPF Semifinals Rockford Thunder defeat Akron Racers 2-1
Game	Date	Score	Series (AKR-ROC)	Location
1	August 21	Akron Racers 1, Rockford Thunder 0	1-0	Akron, Ohio
2	August 21	Akron Racers 1, Rockford Thunder 5	1-1	Akron, Ohio
3	August 22	Akron Racers 2, Rockford Thunder 7	1-2	Akron, Ohio

2009 NPF Championship Series Rockford Thunder defeat USSSA Pride 2-1
Game	Date	Score	Series (ROC-USSSA)	Location
1	August 22	Rockford Thunder 0, USSSA Pride 4	0-1	Akron, Ohio
2	August 23	Rockford Thunder 2, USSSA Pride 0	1-1	Akron, Ohio
3	August 23	Rockford Thunder 2, USSSA Pride 0	2-1	Akron, Ohio

=== Championship Game ===
Team	Top Batter	Stats.
Rockford Thunder	Chelsea Spencer	1-2 RBI HR
USSSA Pride	Oli Keohohou	1-2

Team	Pitcher	IP	H	R	ER	BB	SO	AB	BF
Rockford Thunder	Cat Osterman (W)	7.0	1	0	0	1	13	22	23
USSSA Pride	Sarah Pauly (L)	2.0	4	2	2	1	1	9	12
USSSA Pride	Monica Abbott	4.0	1	0	0	0	4	13	14

2009 NPF Championship Series MVP
Player	Club	Stats.
Cat Osterman	Rockford Thunder	4-1 50Ks 0.22 ERA 2SHs 0.64 WHIP (12Hs+8BBs/31.0 IP)

== Annual awards ==
Majestic Cup
(Best regular season record)
Chicago Bandits

Award	Player	Team
Player of the Year Award	Crystl Bustos	Akron Racers
Pitcher of the Year	Eileen Canney	Chicago Bandits
Rookie of the Year	Tammy Williams	Chicago Bandits
Defensive Player of the Year	Tammy Williams	Chicago Bandits
Offensive Player of the Year	Crystl Bustos	Akron Racers
Coaching Staff of the Year	Akron Racers -- Barb Sherwood, Radara McHugh, Shawn Reis	

2009 All-NPF Team
Position	Name	Team
Pitcher	Cat Osterman	Rockford Thunder
Pitcher	Eileen Canney	Chicago Bandits
Pitcher	Angela Tincher	Akron Racers
Pitcher	Lisa Norris	Akron Racers
Catcher	Rachel Folden	Chicago Bandits
1st Base	Samantha Findlay	Chicago Bandits
2nd Base	Kenora Posey	Akron Racers
3rd Base	Jackie Pasquerella	Akron Racers
Shortstop	Tammy Williams	Chicago Bandits
Outfield	Lisa Modglin	Akron Racers
Outfield	Amber Patton	Chicago Bandits
Outfield	Amanda Williams	Rockford Thunder
At-Large	Crystl Bustos	Akron Racers
At-Large	Oli Keohohou	USSSA Pride
At-Large	Chelsea Spencer	Rockford Thunder
At-Large	Kelly Kretschman	USSSA Pride
At-Large	Jenna Rhodes	Rockford Thunder
At-Large	Amber Jackson	USSSA Pride

== See also ==
- List of professional sports leagues
- List of professional sports teams in the United States and Canada
