= 2010 National Pro Fastpitch season =

2010 NPF Season
- League: National Pro Fastpitch
- Sport: softball
- Duration: June 9, 2010 – August 22, 2010
- Teams: 4

2010 NPF Draft
- Top draft pick: Charlotte Morgan; Alabama
- Picked by: USSSA Pride

Regular Season
- Ringor Cup (Best record): Chicago Bandits

Cowles Cup
- Champions: USSSA Pride
- Runners-up: Chicago Bandits
- Finals MVP: Natasha Watley; USSSA Pride

NPF seasons
- 2009 2011

The 2010 National Pro Fastpitch season was the seventh season of professional softball under the name National Pro Fastpitch (NPF) for the only professional women's fastpitch softball league in the United States. From 1997 to 2002, NPF operated under the names Women's Pro Fastpitch (WPF) and Women's Pro Softball League (WPSL). Each year, the playoff teams battle for the Cowles Cup.

== Teams, cities and stadiums ==
Team	City	Stadium
Akron Racers	Akron, Ohio	Firestone Stadium
Chicago Bandits	Elgin, Illinois (Chicago Area)	Judson University
Tennessee Diamonds	Nashville, Tennessee	Draper Diamond (Lipscomb University)
USSSA Florida Pride	Kissimmee, Florida	Osceola County Stadium and Champion Stadium

National Pro Fastpitch teams

== Milestones and events ==
NPF announced the Rockford Thunder would not be playing in 2010 because ownership "failed to maintain NPF Team requirements to field a Team for the 2010 Season." It was also announced that the league was adding a new team named the Tennessee Diamonds which would begin play in 2010 in Blount County, Tenn. and have first rights to players on the Thunder's roster.

Later it was revealed that the Diamonds would be moving operational headquarters from Alcoa, TN to Nashville, TN. The Alcoa owners did not fund the team or comply with other contractual commitments made to NPF. The team was operated by NPF in Nashville for 2010.

NPF revealed that the Philadelphia Force would not participate in the league when the 2010 schedule was released without the Force.

== Player acquisition ==
=== College draft ===
The 2010 NPF Senior Draft was held February 10, 2010, at Heritage Key Resort in Kissimmee, Florida. The NPF Draft was broadcast on MLB.com. USSSA Pride selected Charlotte Morgan of Alabama as the first overall pick.

=== Notable transactions ===
The USSSA Florida Pride traded Monica Abbott and Shannon Doepking to the Tennessee Diamonds for Diamonds' pitcher Cat Osterman and Megan Willis.

Jennie Finch announced she would retire at the end of the season.

== League standings ==
Team	GP	W	L	Pct.	GB
Chicago Bandits	50	30	20	.600	-
USSSA Pride	48	28	20	.583	1
Akron Racers	49	24	25	.490	5.5
Tennessee Diamonds	49	16	33	.327	13.5

== NPF Championship ==

The 2010 NPF Championship Series was held at McMurry Park in Sulphur, Louisiana August 26–29. All four teams qualified and were seeded based on the final standings. The first seed played the fourth seed on a best-of-three series, and the second seed played the third seed in another best-of-three series. The winners played each other in a best-of-three series that determined the champion.

NPF Semifinals (Best-of-3)
1	Chicago Bandits	2
4	Tennessee Diamonds	0
2	USSSA Pride	2
3	Akron Racers	1

NPF Championship (Best-of-3)
1	Chicago Bandits	1
2	USSSA Pride	2

2010 NPF Semifinals Chicago Bandits defeat Tennessee Diamonds 2–0
Game	Date	Score	Series (CHI-TEN)	Location
1	August 26	Chicago Bandits 2, Tennessee Diamonds 0	1-0	Sulphur, Louisiana
2	August 27	Chicago Bandits 4, Tennessee Diamonds 1	2-0	Sulphur, Louisiana

2010 NPF Semifinals USSSA Pride defeat Akron Racers 2–1
Game	Date	Score	Series (USSA-AKR)	Location
1	August 26	USSSA Pride 3, Akron Racers 2	1-0	Sulphur, Louisiana
2	August 27	USSSA Pride 2, Akron Racers 3	1-1	Sulphur, Louisiana
3	August 28	USSSA Pride 6, Akron Racers 1	2-1	Sulphur, Louisiana

2010 NPF Championship Series USSSA Pride defeat Chicago Bandits 2–1
Game	Date	Score	Series (CHI-USSSA)	Location
1	August 28	Chicago Bandits 1, USSSA Pride 2	0-1	Sulphur, Louisiana
2	August 29	Chicago Bandits 7, USSSA Pride 2	1-1	Sulphur, Louisiana
3	August 29	Chicago Bandits 2, USSSA Pride 7	1-2	Sulphur, Louisiana

=== Championship Game ===
Team	Top Batter	Stats.
USSSA Pride	Lauren Lappin	2-3 2RBIs 2B
Chicago Bandits	Samantha Findlay	2-3 2RBIs 2HRs

Team	Pitcher	IP	H	R	ER	BB	SO
USSSA Pride	Cat Osterman (W)	7.0	2	2	2	3	7
Chicago Bandits	Kristina Thorson (L)	1.1	3	3	3	2	1
Chicago Bandits	Nikki Nemitz	1.2	7	3	3	0	1
Chicago Bandits	Jessica Sallinger	3.0	2	1	1	2	2

2010 NPF Championship Series MVP
Player	Club	Stats.
Natasha Watley	USSSA Pride	.428 (9/21) 3RBIs 2B SB

== Annual awards ==
Ringor Cup
(Best regular season record)
Chicago Bandits

Award	Player	Team
Player of the Year Award	Stacy May	Chicago Bandits
Pitcher of the Year	Lisa Norris	Akron Racers
Rookie of the Year	Nikki Nemitz	Chicago Bandits
Defensive Player of the Year	Lisa Modglin	Akron Racers
Offensive Player of the Year	Rachel Folden	Chicago Bandits
Home Run Award (tie)	Rachel Folden	Chicago Bandits
Home Run Award (tie)	Stacy May	Chicago Bandits
Diamond Spike Award (Note: The Diamond Spike Award is given to the player with the most stolen bases)	Lisa Modglin	Akron Racers
Coaching Staff of the Year	Chicago Bandits -- Mickey Dean, Mike Stuerwald, Maggie Johnson	
Jennie Finch Award (Note: The Jennie Finch award is given to the player who best exemplifies the character and qualities of its famous namesake, and who is considered to positively impact the game both on and off the field.)	Jennie Finch	Chicago Bandits

== Award notes ==
2010 All-NPF Team
Position	Name	Team
Pitcher	Sarah Pauly	USSSA Pride
Pitcher	Monica Abbott	Tennessee Diamonds
Pitcher	Lisa Norris	Akron Racers
Pitcher	Jennie Finch	Chicago Bandits
Catcher	Rachel Folden	Chicago Bandits
1st Base	Samantha Findlay	Chicago Bandits
2nd Base	Chelsea Mesa	Tennessee Diamonds
3rd Base	Stacy May	Chicago Bandits
Shortstop	Chelsea Spencer	Tennessee Diamonds
Outfield	Lisa Modglin	Akron Racers
Outfield	Emily Friedman	Chicago Bandits
Outfield	Kelly Kretschman	USSSA Pride
At-Large	Megan Gibson	Tennessee Diamonds
At-Large	Tonya Callahan	USSSA Pride
At-Large	Jackie Pasquerella	Akron Racers
At-Large	Jessica Valis	Akron Racers
At-Large	Natasha Watley	USSSA Pride
At-Large	Megan Willis	USSSA Pride

== See also ==
- List of professional sports leagues
- List of professional sports teams in the United States and Canada
