= Samantha Ricketts =

American softball coach

Current position
- Title: Head coach
- Team: Mississippi State
- Conference: SEC
- Record: 241–140 (.633)

Biographical details
- Born: December 29, 1986 (age 39); San Jose, California, U.S.
- Education: Oklahoma

Playing career
- 2006–2009: Oklahoma
- 2009–2010: Akron Racers
- Position: First baseman

Coaching career (HC unless noted)

College softball
- 2009–2011: Oklahoma (GA)
- 2012–2014: Wichita State (asst.)
- 2015–2018: Mississippi State (asst.)
- 2019: Mississippi State (AHC)
- 2020–present: Mississippi State

Professional softball
- 2016: USSSA Pride (asst.)

National softball
- 2026–present: American Samoa

Head coaching record
- Overall: 241–140 (.633)

Accomplishments and honors

Championships
- As a Player: Big 12 Regular Season Champions (2009); Big 12 Tournament Champions (2007); As an Assistant: MVC Regular Season Champions (2014)

Samantha Louisa Ricketts (born December 29, 1986) is an American softball coach and former player who is the head coach for the Mississippi State Bulldogs and American Samoa women's national softball team. She played college softball at Oklahoma, where she set the then career RBI record and was named a two-time Second Team NFCA All-American.

== Playing career ==
Ricketts played college softball for Oklahoma from 2006 to 2009, where she set the then career RBI record and was named a two-time Second Team NFCA All-American.

Ricketts was drafted 12th overall by the Akron Racers in the 2009 NPF Draft, and played two seasons for the team.

== Coaching career ==
=== Mississippi State ===
On July 21, 2014, Ricketts was named an assistant coach for Mississippi State. On July 30, 2018, she was promoted to associate head coach. On July 22, 2019, Ricketts was named the head coach for Mississippi State.

=== USSSA Pride ===
On May 25, 2016, Ricketts was named an assistant coach for the USSSA Pride of the National Pro Fastpitch league.

=== American Samoa ===
On February 3, 2026, Ricketts was named head coach of the American Samoa women's national softball team.

== Personal life ==
Ricketts is of Samoan descent. She has three siblings including Richard, who played college football at Air Force, Stephanie, who played college softball and basketball at Hawaii, and Keilani, who played college softball at Oklahoma and professional softball in the AUSL.

== Statistics ==
=== Oklahoma Sooners ===
YEAR	G	AB	R	H	BA	RBI	HR	3B	2B	TB	SLG	BB	SO	SB	SBA
2006	57	166	23	59	.355	51	9	0	11	97	.584%	19	17	0	0
2007	63	183	41	76	.415	81	18	0	12	142	.776%	37	11	1	1
2008	60	159	33	56	.352	51	13	2	9	108	.679%	38	12	0	0
2009	57	180	32	58	.322	56	8	0	15	97	.539%	21	7	1	2
TOTALS	237	688	129	249	.362	239	48	2	47	444	.645%	115	47	2	3

== Head coaching record ==
=== College ===
Record table
Season	Team	Overall	Conference	Standing	Postseason
Mississippi State Bulldogs (Southeastern Conference) (2020–Present)
2020	Mississippi State	25–3	0–0		Season canceled due to COVID-19
2021	Mississippi State	35–25	8–15	9th	NCAA Regional
2022	Mississippi State	37–27	10–14	11th	NCAA Super Regional
2023	Mississippi State	28–25	7–16	12th	
2024	Mississippi State	34–20	12–12	T–6th	NCAA Regional
2025	Mississippi State	39–19	13–11	T–7th	NCAA Regional
2026	Mississippi State	43–21	9–15	T–10th	Women's College World Series
Mississippi State:		241–140 (.633)	59–83 (.415)		
Total:		241–140 (.633)			
National champion Postseason invitational champion Conference regular season champion Conference regular season and conference tournament champion Division regular season champion Division regular season and conference tournament champion Conference tournament champion
