= Ashley Holcombe =

American softball player

Personal information
- Born: Ashley Kristina Holcombe; February 20, 1987 (age 39) Riverdale, Georgia, U.S.
- Education: University of Alabama
- Occupation: Softball player
- Years active: 2006 – present
- Employer: US women's national softball team
- Height: 5 ft 6 in (168 cm)
- Spouse: Clifford Bell (m. 2010)
- Parents: Wayne and Vickey Holcombe
Medal record
Women's softball
Representing United States
Pan American Games
Gold medal – first place	2011 Guadalajara	Team

Ashley Kristina Holcombe (born February 20, 1987) is an American softball player who plays catcher for the USA national softball team. Holcombe is now in her third year with the Women's National Team.

== College ==
Holcombe attended the University of Alabama, majoring in marketing. She made 244 career starts at catcher over four years played on the Crimson Tide softball team. She was named second-team All-SEC after the 2008 season when she hit .323 for the season with 12 doubles, five home runs and 21 RBI. She also threw out twenty-six base runners and picked off five. Holcombe was also named an ESPN.com All American her senior year. She was selected as a candidate for the Lowe's Senior CLASS Award during the 2009 season.

== Post-college career ==
Holcombe was drafted in the fifth round by the Rockford Thunder of the National Pro Fastpitch softball league. She appeared in 14 games for the Thunder, posting a .121 batting average, 4 hits, 1 RBI, and 1 run. On January 11, 2010, she was again named to the 2010 USA women's national softball team. On January 22, 2010, the NPF's Chicago Bandits announced that they had signed Holcombe to a contract for the 2010 season. On July 28, 2011, Samford University head softball coach Mandy Burford announced that Holcombe had been named an assistant coach on the Samford softball coaching staff.

== Personal life ==
On October 9, 2010, Holcombe and her fiancé, Clifford Bell, exchanged marriage vows in a private ceremony at the Higdon House in Greensboro, Georgia.

== Career statistics ==
Year	Team	GP	GS	AB	R	H	HR	RBI	BB	SO	Avg.	OBP	SLG	E	FLD%
2006	Alabama	61	61	149	14	36	3	18	11	28	.242	.317	.369	7	.988
2007	Alabama	59	58	135	18	37	6	29	19	15	.274	.373	.437	5	.987
2008	Alabama	66	65	163	41	48	7	25	25	23	.294	.412	.503	6	.988
2009	Alabama	62	60	142	27	42	8	50	14	16	.296	.380	.493	5	.988
