= Monica Abbott =

American softball player (born 1985)

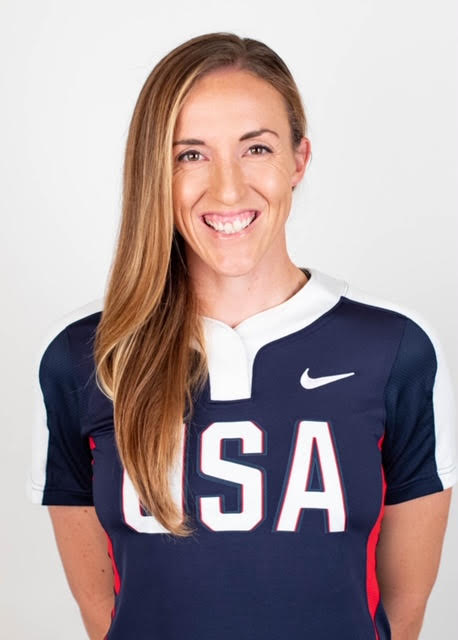
- Abbott in 2017

Team USA – No. 14
- Pitcher
- Born: July 28, 1985 (age 40); Santa Cruz, California, U.S.
- Bats: Left Throws: Left

NPF debut
- 2007, for the Tennessee Diamonds

Teams
- Tennessee (2004–2007); NPF (2007–2017); Toyota Red Terriers (2009–2022); Team USA (2005–2010, 2018–2023)

Career highlights and awards
- 2x Olympic Silver Medalist; 3× World Champion; 5× NPF Champion; 6× JSL Champion; Honda Sports Award (2007); USA Softball Collegiate Player of the Year (2007); SEC Female Athlete of the Year (2007); NCAA Record holder in Strikes; NCAA Record holder in Wins

Medal record

Women's softball

Representing United States

Olympic Games
Silver medal – second place	2008 Beijing	Team
Silver medal – second place	2020 Tokyo	Team

ISF Women's World Championship
Gold medal – first place	2006 Beijing	Team
Gold medal – first place	2010 Caracas	Team
Gold medal – first place	2018 Chiba City	Team

World Cup of Softball
Silver medal – second place	2005 Oklahoma City	Team
Gold medal – first place	2006 Oklahoma City	Team
Gold medal – first place	2007 Oklahoma City	Team
Gold medal – first place	2009 Oklahoma City	Team
Gold medal – first place	2010 Oklahoma City	Team
Gold medal – first place	2018 Irvine	Team
Gold medal – first place	2019 Columbus	Team

Pan American Games
Gold medal – first place	2007 Rio de Janeiro	Team
Gold medal – first place	2019 Lima	Team

World Games
Gold medal – first place	2022 Birmingham	Team

Monica Cecilia Abbott (born July 28, 1985) is an American retired professional softball player. Abbott was an All-American pitcher for the Tennessee Lady Volunteers in college before starting a professional career in the NPF and in the Japan Softball League. In international competition, she has played for Team USA from 2005 including the national softball team winning a silver medal at the 2008 and 2020 Summer Olympics. Abbott is the NCAA Division I leader in wins, strikeouts, shutouts and innings.

== Early life and education ==
Abbott was born in Santa Cruz, California and grew up in Salinas, California. Abbott attended North Salinas High School from 1999 to 2003; her parents are Bruce and Julie Abbott, and her siblings are Jessica (born 1984), Jared (born 1988) and twins Bina and Gina (born 1991).

While at North Salinas, Abbott led the Vikings to three CIF Central Coast Section Division I titles, averaging more than 300 strikeouts per season.

Abbott won the Cal-Hi Softball Athlete of the Year, the Sports Focus Athlete of the Year, the state's large school Player of the Year, and the MVP trophies from her high school, conference, county and section. She was also a two-time recipient of The Salinas Californian Athlete of the Year.

== University of Tennessee ==
Much sought after by many colleges, Abbott decided to go to the University of Tennessee, with their treatment of female athletes an influencing factor. Abbott pitched for the University of Tennessee Lady Volunteers softball team from 2004 to 2007 and majored in communications.

=== Freshman ===
Abbott became Tennessee's first All-American when selected as a Louisville Slugger/NFCA First Team All-American. In 59 appearances, Abbott was 45–10, compiled a 1.03 earned run average with 44 complete games and 24 solo shutouts, four no-hitters and a perfect game. She struck out 582 batters in 352 innings. Following the season she was named SEC Freshman of the Year. Abbott became the third pitcher in NCAA history to notch 500 strikeouts in a season.

=== Sophomore ===
Abbott became a two-time first-team Louisville Slugger/NFCA All-American and All-South Region selection after going 50–9 with a 0.52 ERA in 392.0 IP. She broke her own record for single season wins with 50 and had 603 strikeouts thus becoming the first pitcher in NCAA Division I history to record 500 strikeouts in a season twice in her career. She helped lead UT to its first WCWS and was named to the WCWS All-Tourney team.

=== Junior ===
Once again, Abbott was chosen as a first-team Louisville Slugger/NFCA All-American as well as a first-team All-South Region choice. She led UT to the WCWS and was chosen as WCWS All-Tournament. Abbott's 531 strikeouts made an unprecedented third year in a row of over 500.

=== Senior ===
Abbott struck out an NCAA Single Season current Record of 724 batters. She had 23 no-hitters and six perfect games and was named the 2007 USA Softball Collegiate Player of the Year and the Women's Sports Foundation Sportswoman of the Year award for Team Sports athletes. She also was the 2007 Honda Award Winner.

She guided UT to its first SEC title and a berth in the CWS championship, where they lost to top-ranked Arizona in the best-of-three series final. Once again she was named to the all-tournament team.

=== Legacy ===
Abbott set career and single season NCAA records her senior season with 189 victories, 2,440 strikeouts, 112 shutouts, 253 appearances and 1,448.0 innings pitched. She set a Single Season Record in Strikeouts of 724. Abbott was the first pitcher in NCAA Division I history to record 500 strikeouts in all four years of her collegiate career. She was inducted in the Tennessee Athletics hall of fame. She was Tennessee's first softball All-American in school history and was named to the All-Women's College World Series team three times.

== US National Team ==
Abbott enjoyed tremendous success internationally between 2005 and 2010. She led Team USA to four World Cup of Softball championships, three Canada Cup titles, and gold medals at both the 2006 and 2010 ISF Women's World Championships. Abbott pitched the United States to a gold medal at the 2007 Pan Am Games in Rio. Abbott stepped down from the US Softball National Team in 2010 but returned in 2018 where she helped the USA win another World Championship. She was also a member of the team that won the 2018, 2019 USA Softball International Cup, 2018 & 2019 Japan Cup and 2019 Pan Am Games.

=== 2008 Olympics ===
Abbott was selected for the final 15-person Olympic squad as one of three pitchers. On August 11, 2008, Abbott made her Olympic debut for Team USA, pitching the final inning against Venezuela. Abbott then pitched a 5 inning perfect game, striking out 8, as Team USA defeated the Netherlands 8–0. This was the first perfect game pitched in the Olympics.

In pool play, Abbott pitched the US to a 7–0 victory against Japan. She then pitched against them in the semi-final securing the 4–1 win and USA's place in the gold medal game.

Team USA met Japan in the gold medal game and lost 3–1. Abbott pitched the final two innings. She finished the Olympics with a 0.29 ERA and a 3–0 record in 24 innings pitched while striking out 32 batters.

=== 2020 Olympics ===
Abbott agreed to be a part of the Olympic squad, softball's first appearance at the Olympics since 2008. The Olympics were postponed to 2021 as a result of the COVID-19 pandemic.

Abbott started in three matches for Team USA in the 2020 Summer Olympics group stage against Canada, Australia, and Japan. In addition, she came in as the relief pitcher for group stage matches against Italy and Mexico as well as in the gold medal match against Japan. She pitched 20.1 innings with 31 strikeouts, 7 hits, and a 0.00 ERA. Team USA lost to Japan 2–0 in the gold medal match and Abbott earned a silver medal along with the rest of the team. Following the tournament, she was named onto the WBSC All-Olympic softball team.

== Professional career ==
Abbott has been a member of five winning NPF teams, being named MVP in all those championships. She was also a NPF runner-up in 2009 and 2013.

=== NPF ===
Abbott debuted in the NPF on August 2, 2007, by striking out a career best 18 batters in a 10-inning victory against the Rockford Thunder. They won the 2007 NPF Championship, vs Rockford when Abbott threw a no hitter in the final.

In 2009 she played for the USSSA Pride as a runner up and in 2010 was traded to the Tennessee Diamonds. She signed as a free agent with the Chicago Bandits from 2011 to 2015. On July 23, 2015, Abbott pitched her second perfect game as a member of the Chicago Bandits, beating the Dallas Charge, 10–0. In May 2016, the Scrap Yard Dawgs, a National Pro Fastpitch team, signed Abbott to a six-year contract, believed to be worth $1 million and the highest salary paid by a professional women's sports team in the United States.

For her career she is the most decorated pitcher in the league history with five Pitcher of The Year awards and 9 All-NPF Team selections. Currently, she also holds the career wins and strikeouts crowns (the second pitcher to achieve each milestone and the only to have both) along with the no-hitters (6), shutouts record (also the only pitcher to cross the 40 and 50 total). She also ranks top-10 in ERA, WHIP, innings and strikeout ratio (10.1).

=== Japan Softball League ===
In 2010, Abbott joined the Japan Softball League (JSL). In her first season abroad, she led the circuit in strikeouts, ERA and was named league MVP while leading her Toyota team to the Japan Softball League title. She pitched a perfect game in the final, then threw a no-hitter in the championship game the following year to lead Toyota to back-to-back titles. Toyota went on to threepeat for the JSL titles in 2010, 2011, 2012. They also won titles in 2014, 2016, & 2018 She was a 5x MVP winning in 2010, 2011, 2012, 2016, 2018) At the end of the 2022 campaign, Abbott retired from pro softball after playing 14 seasons in the JSL. A few month later, Abbott announced her retirement from Team USA softball.

== Miscellaneous ==
Abbott always wears Number 14. At Tennessee she wore #7 and it was retired by Tennessee.

Abbott founded the Monica Abbott Scholarship fund to support the education of female multi-sport athletes who demonstrate leadership both in the classroom and on the field. In addition, she hosts clinics with young softball players across the United States. Abbott hosts about 16 different instructional clinics for children under the age of 18 each year. As demand for more clinics has gotten stronger, Abbott is planning to introduce an online academy to help her reach more youth. The academy will feature video tutorials that go in-depth into the three focuses of Abbott's pitching style: rise ball, power pitching, and basic mechanics and leg drive.

Her fans are called Moniacs.

== Career records ==
Abbott is simultaneously the NCAA Division I leader in Victories (189), Shutouts (112), Strikeouts (2,440), Single-Season Strikeouts (724) and innings pitched. During her senior season in college, she set the record for the most strikeouts in a Division I softball season.

She also holds the career records in wins, strikeouts, no hitters and shutouts for the National Pro Fastpitch.

In Japan, Abbott was a 6-time champion and a 5-time MVP. She is currently a member of the independent "This is Us" team.

Abbott is in the Guinness Book of Records with the fastest softball pitch ever, reaching 77 miles per hour back on June 16, 2012, in a National Pro Fastpitch (NPF) game between Abbott's Chicago Bandits and the Carolina Diamonds.

=== Single-game accomplishments ===
- NCAA Division I tied-2nd highest 7-inning strikeout total of all-time (20), set on March 26 of her freshman year vs Liberty University
- 6 games of at least 17 strikeouts in a 7-inning game, a mark only accomplished 20 times in NCAA Division I history (including Abbott's performances)

=== Season accomplishments ===
- 2007 USA Softball Collegiate Player of the Year
- Only Player with more than one 50-win season in a career (2)
- Only Player with four seasons of 40+ wins in a career
- Only Player with four 500-strikeout seasons (and two 600-strikeout seasons) in a collegiate career
- Most strikeouts in a season (2007) – 724
- Most games pitched in a season (2005) – 69
- Most wins and most strikeouts in a season by a freshman (2004) – 45 wins and 582 strikeouts

=== Career accomplishments ===
- 2,440 career NCAA Division I strikeouts (1st all-time)
- 189 career NCAA Division I wins (1st all-time)
- 112 career shutouts (1st all-time)
- 253 career games pitched (1st all-time)
- 206 career games started (1st all-time)
- 1448 career innings pitched (1st all-time)
- 178 career complete games (2nd all-time)
- 11.80 career strikeouts per 7 innings (3rd all-time)
- .848 career win percentage
- 16 career saves (tied-10th all-time)
- 23 career NCAA Division I no-hitters (2nd all-time)
- 6 career NCAA Division I perfect games (2nd all-time)

== Career highlights ==
- 6× Japan Softball League Champion (2010, 2011, 2012, 2014, 2016, 2018)
- 5× Japan Softball League MVP (2010, 2011, 2012, 2016, 2018)
- 2008 Olympic Silver Medalist
- Pitched First Perfect Game in Olympic History
- 3× World Champion Gold Medalist
- 2× Pan American Gold Medalist
- 5× National Pro Fastpitch Champion (2007, 2011, 2013, 2015, 2017)
- 4× NPF MVP (2007, 2011, 2015, 2017)
- 5× NPF Pitcher of the Year (2011, 2012, 2015, 2016, 2017)
- All-NPF Selection (2009, 2010, 2011, 2012, 2013, 2014, 2015, 2016, 2017)
- Women's Sports Foundation Sportswoman of the Year (2007)
- Honda Award Winner in Softball (2007)
- 4× All-American
- First pitcher in D1 to record 500 Strikeouts all 4 seasons at the collegiate level.

== Career statistics ==
Team USA
YEAR	W	L	GP	GS	CG	SHO	SV	IP	H	R	ER	BB	SO	ERA	WHIP
2004	5	1	8	5	3	2	1	32.0	19	4	2	3	46	0.43	0.68
2005	2	0	2	2	0	0	0	7.0	6	4	4	2	8	4.00	1.14
2008	6	0	12	5	1	0	0	37.0	10	3	3	6	71	0.56	0.43
2020	6	0	7	4	1	1	1	31.2	5	0	0	2	68	0.00	0.22
2021	6	0	11	6	5	3	4	53.2	24	3	2	7	101	0.26	0.58
Olympics	3	0	6	2	2	1	2	20.1	7	0	0	9	31	0.00	0.79
TOTALS	28	1	46	24	12	7	8	181.2	71	14	11	29	325	0.42	0.55

Tennessee Lady Volunteers
YEAR	W	L	GP	GS	CG	Sh	SV	IP	H	R	ER	BB	SO	ERA	WHIP
2004	45	10	59	47	44	24	4	352.0	165	72	52	57	582	1.03	0.63
2005	50	9	69	56	47	34	3	392.0	162	37	29	45	603	0.52	0.53
2006	44	10	62	51	42	25	4	345.2	186	64	47	48	531	0.95	0.68
2007	50	5	63	52	45	29	5	358.1	136	36	35	63	724	0.68	0.55
TOTALS	189	34	253	206	178	112	16	1448.0	649	209	163	213	2440	0.79	0.59

National Pro Fastpitch
YEAR	NPF Team	W	L	GP	GS	CG	Sh	SV	IP	H	R	ER	BB	SO	ERA	WHIP
2007	Washington Glory	2	0	—	3	2	—	2	23.2	19	10	5	2	37	1.51	0.90
2009	USSSA Pride	2	3	—	6	5	—	0	45.1	30	15	10	9	69	1.55	0.86
2010	Tennessee Diamonds	7	11	19	17	17	3	0	127.1	89	30	19	13	161	1.04	0.80
2011	Chicago Bandits	15	4	22	14	12	5	1	125.0	58	25	20	17	170	1.12	0.60
2012	Chicago Bandits	16	3	26	17	15	7	4	140.0	72	25	21	37	209	1.05	0.78
2013	Chicago Bandits	18	5	25	18	17	9	1	142.2	99	25	21	25	207	1.03	0.87
2014	Chicago Bandits	10	7	20	—	—	4	3	105.2	62	24	16	30	144	1.06	0.87
2015	Chicago Bandits	16	1	20	15	15	13	2	112.1	39	6	5	26	175	0.31	0.58
2016	Scrap Yard Dawgs	19	3	26	20	13	8	3	142.2	81	23	20	33	185	0.98	0.80
2017	Scrap Yard Dawgs	21	4	26	19	16	7	2	144.0	68	27	24	36	269	1.16	0.72
TOTALS		126	41	+184	+129	+112	56	18	1108.2	617	210	161	228	1626	1.01	0.76
