= Haley Cruse Mitchell =

American softball player (born 1998)

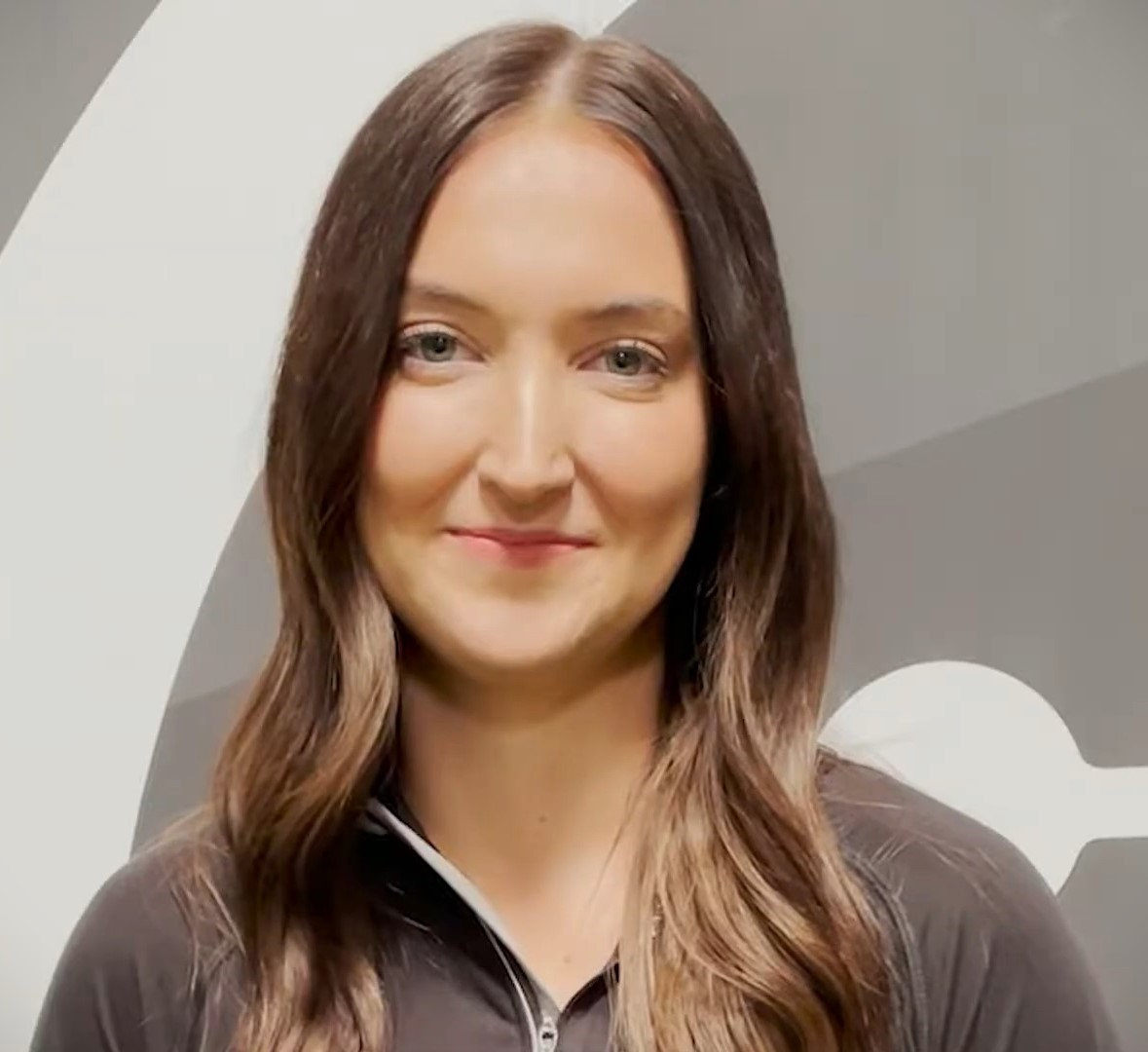
- Cruse in 2022
- Outfielder
- Born: May 26, 1998 (age 28); San Diego, California

Teams
- Oregon (2017–2021); USSSA Pride (2021–2022)

Haley Jean Cruse Mitchell (born May 26, 1998) is an American former professional softball player. She played college softball at Oregon and professionally for USSSA Pride.

== High school ==
Born Haley Jean Cruse in San Diego, Mitchell attended Del Norte High School in San Diego and played club softball for the Corona Angels. She was a four-time first team all-Avocado East League choice. In 112 games, she had a .463 batting average, 183 hits, 72 RBI's, and 141 runs. She pitched her freshman year, with a 1.41 ERA in 34.2 innings and 28 strikeouts.

== College career ==
After graduating from high school in 2017, Mitchell attended the University of Oregon where she played for the Oregon Ducks softball team for 5 seasons. She led the team in hitting for four straight years, becoming the first player in the program's history to do so. She led all of the Pac-12 Conference in hitters her sophomore year. She played in the 2017 and 2018 Women's College World Series. She had a career high four hits at Stanford on March 30, 2019. She finished her career in the top 10 in four stat categories, 5th in batting average with a .378, 5th in runs with 156 scored, 7th in stolen bases with 63, and tied at 8th with 38 doubles.

Mitchell graduated from the university in Oregon with a bachelor's degree in business in 2020. She then got a master's degree in advertising at Oregon in 2021.

== Professional career ==
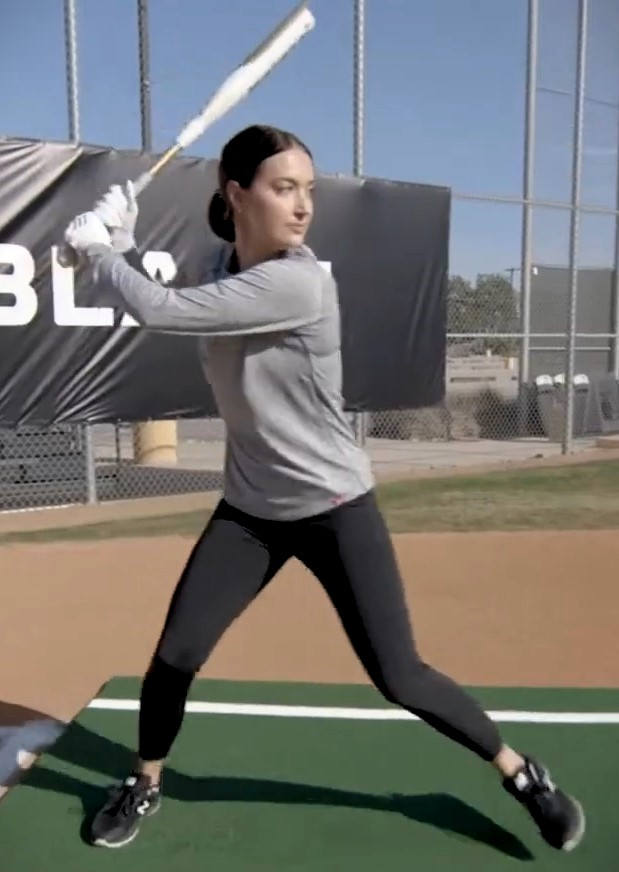
Cruse batting in 2022

Cruse signed with the USSSA Pride after finishing her college career. On April 7, 2023, Cruse announced her retirement from softball.

== Personal life ==
In 2021, Cruse married pro baseball outfielder Garrett Mitchell.

Outside of softball, Cruse has also earned fame for her dancing videos with her Oregon teammate Jasmine Williams on TikTok, where she has over 800,000 followers on the app.
