= Andrea Duran =

American softball player (born 1984)

USSSA Pride – No. 28
- Infielder
- Born: April 12, 1984 (age 42); Selma, California, U.S.
- Bats: Right Throws: Right

Professional debut
- NCAA: 2003, for the UCLA Bruins
- NPF: 2010, for the USSSA Pride

NPF statistics (through entire career)
- Batting average: .287
- Hits: 200
- Home Runs: 24
- Runs batted in: 122

Teams
- UCLA Bruins (2003–2006); USSSA Pride (2010–2023)

Career highlights and awards
- 3× Cowles Cup Champion (2010, 2013–2014); 4× NPF Regular Season Champion (2011–2012, 2014–2015); 4× All-NPF Team as 3rd Basewomen (2011, 2013–2015); UCLA Female Athlete of the Year (2006); Pac-10 Player of the Year (2006); 2× Women's College World Series champion (2003, 2004); WCWS All-Tournament Team (2006); NFCA All-American (2006); NCAA Regional All-Tournament Team (2004); ESPN: The Magazine Academic All-Honors (2004)
Medals
Representing United States
Women's Softball
Olympic Games
Silver medal – second place	2008 Beijing	Team competition
ISF Women's World Championship
Gold medal – first place	2006 Beijing

Andrea Jane Duran (born April 12, 1984) is an American, former collegiate All-American, medal-winning Olympian, professional four-time All-Star softball player. She played college softball at the University of California, Los Angeles in the Pac-12 Conference, where she was named to the all-conference team twice, and Pac-12 Player of the Year in 2006. She also won two national championships in 2003 and 2004, and was named to the All-Tournament team in 2006. She won a silver medal at the 2008 Summer Olympics. On the Olympic team she played third base and outfield. Duran was undrafted but later played professionally in the National Pro Fastpitch, being named the 2014 Player of the Year and winning three Cowles Cup championships with the USSSA Pride.

== Career ==
Her international competition debut was with the United States women's national softball team in 2006 where they went on to win a gold medal at the 2006 ISF World Championship.

In 2010 she returned to UCLA to assume a position as director of operations with the coaching staff for the UCLA Softball Team.

For her career in the NPF she currently ranks top-10 in career RBIs (133) for the league.

== Statistics ==
=== UCLA Bruins ===
YEAR	G	AB	R	H	BA	RBI	HR	3B	2B	TB	SLG	BB	SO	SB	SBA
2003	61	160	36	45	.281	21	3	0	6	60	.375%	10	23	6	8
2004	56	184	36	60	.326	22	7	2	11	96	.521%	11	15	8	9
2005	60	189	40	60	.317	27	6	8	10	104	.550%	22	18	10	15
2006	59	197	60	70	.355	42	15	7	15	144	.731%	22	22	20	22
TOTALS	236	730	172	235	.322	112	31	17	42	404	.553%	65	78	44	54

=== Team USA Olympic Games ===
YEAR	G	AB	R	H	BA	RBI	HR	3B	2B	TB	SLG	BB	SO	SB	SBA
2008	8	20	4	6	.300	5	0	0	2	8	.400%	5	3	1	1
