= Natasha Watley =

American softball player (born 1981)

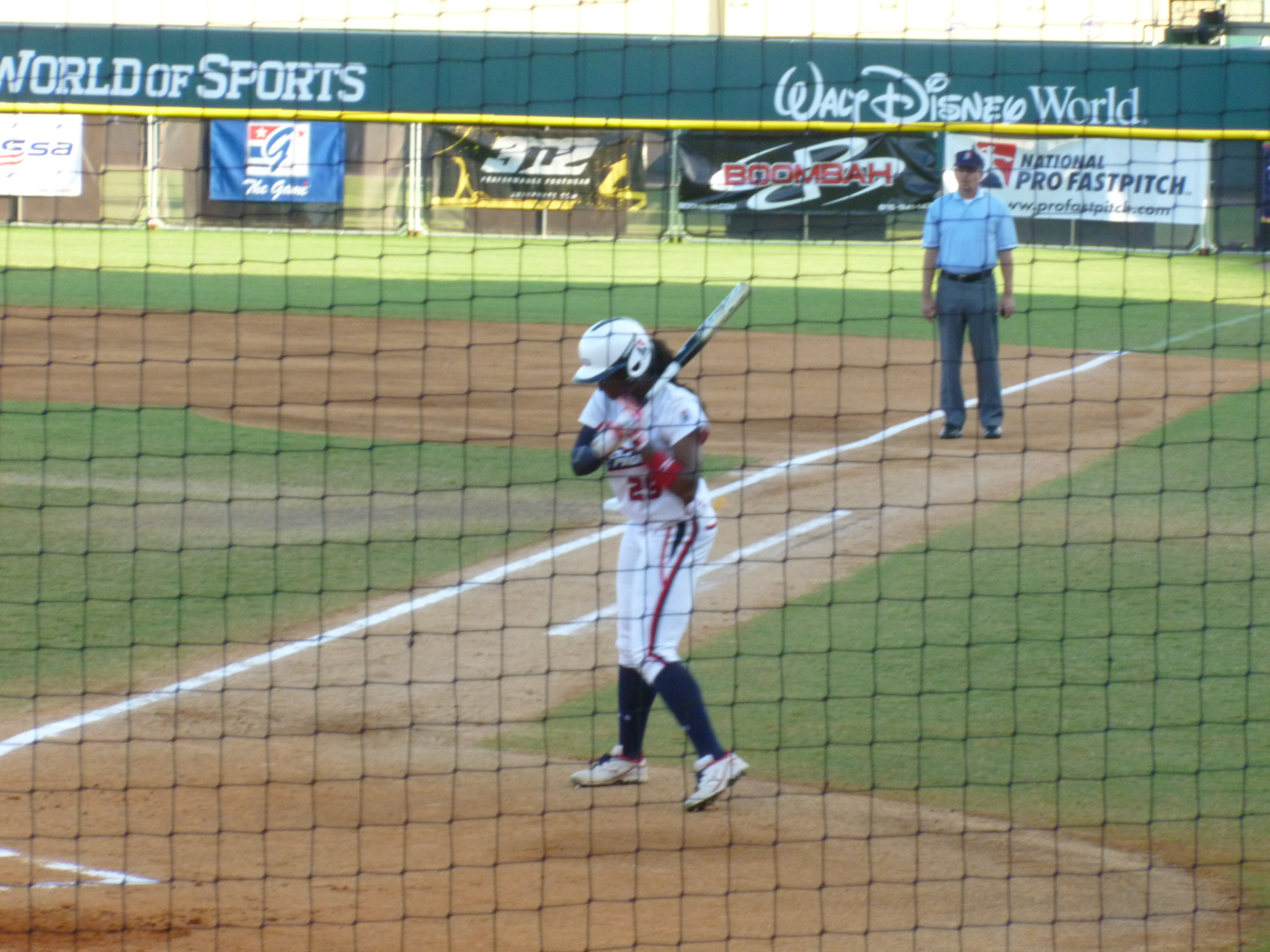
- Watley in 2011

Personal information
- Born: November 27, 1981 (age 44) Irvine, California, U.S.
- Height: 5 ft 10 in (1.78 m)

Sport
- College team: UCLA Bruins
Medal record
Women's softball
Representing the United States
Olympic Games
Gold medal – first place	2004 Athens	Team competition
Silver medal – second place	2008 Beijing	Team competition

Natasha Renee Watley (born November 27, 1981) is an American, former collegiate four-time first-team All-American, two-time medal winning Olympian, retired seven-time pro-All-Star softball player. Watley played college softball at UCLA, and helped the Bruins win a national championship. She represented the United States women's national softball team at the 2004 Summer Olympics. She won a gold medal, and again at the 2008 Summer Olympics, and won a silver medal.

She is the first African-American female to play on the United States softball team in the Olympics. She is the career batting average leader in the National Pro Fastpitch. She owns numerous records for the Bruins and is one of select NCAA Division I players to bat at least .400 with 300 hits, 200 runs and 100 stolen bases for her career.

== Early life ==
Watley was born in Irvine, California to parents Edwin and Carolyn Watley. She is African American. Watley attended Woodbridge High School where she was named second-team Louisville Slugger All-American in her junior and senior years. She hit over .445 in her last three seasons in addition to stealing 20+ bases each season.

== College career ==
In 2001, Watley earned status by being named a First Team All-American as well as All Pac-10. She stole 32 bases to break the school record, which now ranks fourth all-time at UCLA.

On May 13, Watley was a perfect 4/4 with 2 RBIs and a double against the Oregon Ducks for a career-high in single-game hits. On May 18, she stole a record 4 bases to break another school record vs. the Canisius Golden Griffins.

Watley and the Bruins made it into the Women's College World Series finals vs. the Oklahoma Sooners. Watley was perfect against Jennifer Stewart, going 3/3 and scoring the only run in the Bruins eventual 3–1 defeat on May 29.

Watley repeated all-season honors for a second straight year. She set school records with 75 runs and 56 stolen bases, while her season total hits were second all-time.

Beginning March 2 through April 29, 2001, she managed a 32-consecutive-game hit streak, which is the fifth longest in NCAA history. The streak stretched to 36 games overall beginning on February 17; the Bruins had a week off before April 29. In that span, Watley batted .426 (55/129) with 14 RBI, a home run, three triples and doubles each.

Once again on May 28, Watley found herself in the WCWS National Championship game vs. conference rival the Arizona Wildcats. Watley had one of 4 hits off MVP and eventual victor Jennie Finch.

The streak of three First Team All-American and All-Pac-10 honors continued as the junior also broke the school record for hits in a season (112), which also led the NCAA Division I. Her triples and stolen bases were second best all-time, while her career-best .485 average ranked 4th (5th all-time) at UCLA.

Notching her second-longest streak, Watley began a 29-consecutive-game hit streak from February 1 until March 9. Watley hit .543 (56/103) and had 24 RBIs, two home runs, three triples, and 7 doubles. She also had a slugging percentage of .747% and overall her streak was 6th best for the NCAA.

Watley was named to the WCWS All-Tournament Team, hitting over .450 for the Bruins.

Again earning a place on the All-American team, she added the 2003 Pac-10 Player of the Year, won the Honda Sports Award as the nation's best softball player, and the Honda Cup as the nation's top female athlete. Watley ranked top-10 in school season categories of batting average, hits, on-base percentage and stolen bases.

From January 31 to February 28, she had her third-longest hit streak at 19 consecutive games. She hit .500 (30/60) with 21 RBIs, two home runs, a triple and 4 doubles. On April 30, Watley batted in a career-high 5 RBIs on two home runs to defeat the Washington Huskies.

At the year's WCWS, Watley was again named to the All-Tournament Team, batting over .400 with 3 RBIs and slugging over .550%. The Bruins made it into their third finale with Watley and claimed the no-hit win over Kelly Anderson and the California Golden Bears on May 26. Watley went 2/5 with a triple.

In her four years as a starter for the Bruins, she finished tops in career hits, triples, runs and stolen bases. She ranked second in career batting average (.450) and top-10 in doubles and on-base percentages. Watley holds the single-season record for hits (112) and is currently ranked fourth in Pac-10 history. Watley is listed seventh on the all-time NCAA record books with 115 hits in a single season. She was also the first UCLA Bruin to have two 100+ hit seasons. She overall ranks top-10 in career hits.

Watley was inducted into the UCLA Athletics Hall of Fame on October 11, 2014.

== National team ==
In the summer of 2001, Watley played for the USA Red Team helping them win the US Cup and place third at the Canada Cup. She was named "Most Inspirational Player" at the Canada Cup in addition to being named to the All-Tournament Team. In 2002, she was named to the All-Tournament Team at the Canada Cup and the 2002 ISF World Championship tournaments where she also earned Most Valuable Player. In 2003, Watley was also awarded a gold medal for her performance at the Pan American Games.

In preparation for the 2004 Olympics, Watley hit over .450 on the Aiming For Athens tour to help maintain Team USA's perfect record in Olympic tours. At the Games on August 14, Watley went a perfect 4/4 with a double and triple vs. Italy. She assisted Team USA softball to their third consecutive gold medal at the Athens Olympic Games defeating Australia 5–1, the only run allowed in the entire tournament, to earn her first gold medal on August 23. Watley led the team in at-bats, hits, stolen bases and was third on the team with a .400 batting average. She also broke the Olympic record for stolen bases with five in nine games.

In 2008 on the Bound 4 Beijing Tour, Watley hit over .450 once again. She led the tour in at-bats, triples, and stolen bases. Watley opened the Games smacking a two-run home run in a run-rule victory over Venezuela. Watley ended the Games in the gold medal contest on August 21, Watley had a hit in Team USA's 3–1 upset by Yukiko Ueno and Team Japan to earn Silver. Watley hit .321 and led the team in at-bats and stolen bases.

== Professional career ==
Watley played her first season professionally with the NY/NJ Juggernaut in the National Pro Fastpitch league in 2005. In her rookie season, Watley led the Nauts in batting with a .374 average and tallied 37 hits as the leadoff hitter to be named an NPF All-Star. In 2006, Watley played for the Philadelphia Force in limited action (30 at-bats) due to Team USA duties.

Watley played longest for the USSSA Pride based out of Kissimmee, Florida. In the 2010 season, Watley received her second All-NPF Team honor and on August 6 she set a career best in hits with 4 against the Tennessee Diamonds. Her team made it into the Cowles Cup Championship on August 29 vs. the Chicago Bandits. Watley hit a solo home run in a 3/4 performance against pitchers Kristina Thorson, Nikki Nemitz, and Jessica Sallinger to win the title. For the 2011 season, she led the league in average at .459 and had a 21 consecutive game hit streak for a career highlight. From July 2-August 12, she hit .531 (43/81) with 15 RBIs, a triple, and two doubles, slugging .580% with two walks and 11 stolen bases. She got a rematch shot at defending her team's title on August 24. The Pride lost but Watley had two hits and batted in two of three runs off ace Monica Abbott, pitching for the Bandits.

In 2012, Watley was second overall in batting average, and on July 16 against Chicago, she drove in a career-best 4 RBIs. She had a rematch in the Cowles Cup Championship with the Chicago Bandits and Monica Abbott; the team lost again on August 25 at a 2–1 score, but Watley managed a hit in the effort. For the 2013 season championship, Watley earned the Cowles Cup Championship and had a hit in the finale. In 2014, she became the first player in league history to amass 300 career hits. On June 24 she walked 3 times against the Akron Racers for another highlight. In 2015 it marked her sixth straight season with at least 50 hits to be named All-NPF. Watley earned a second-season batting crown in 2015 and made her last appearance in the Cowles Championship final losing to the Bandits but did tally a hit and walk in her last game. Watley also set an enduring league record for hits in 2011. She also holds the career batting crown for playing multiple seasons and is tied for second in stolen bases and hits, ranking third for triples. Watley spent the 2016 season overseas in Japan. She was a part of the Japan Softball League Champions on team Toyota. She retired in 2017.

== Statistics ==
UCLA Bruins
YEAR	G	AB	R	H	BA	RBIs	HR	3B	2B	TB	SLG	BB	SO	SB	SBA
2000	58	188	48	80	.425	11	1	4	10	101	.537%	12	15	32	37
2001	68	247	75	101	.409	36	2	5	9	126	.510%	11	18	52	56
2002	64	231	65	112	.485	35	2	7	14	146	.632%	17	9	39	47
2003	61	212	64	102	.481	53	10	5	12	154	.726%	22	14	35	44
TOTALS	251	878	252	395	.450	135	15	21	45	527	.600%	62	56	158	184

Team USA
YEAR	AB	R	H	BA	RBIs	HR	3B	2B	TB	SLG	BB	SO	SB	SBA
2004	207	90	96	.464	36	2	3	12	120	.579%	27	15	30	34
2008	240	89	108	.450	62	5	6	9	144	.600%	17	22	25	26
TOTALS	447	179	204	.456	98	7	9	21	264	.590%	44	37	55	60

NPF
YEAR	AB	R	H	BA	RBIs	HR	3B	2B	TB	SLG	BB	SO	SB
2005	96	21	37	.385	5	0	2	4	45	.468%	10	7	9
2006	33	2	10	.303	1	0	1	0	12	.363%	1	2	4
2010	138	27	56	.437	7	1	0	6	65	.471%	3	10	15
2011	146	35	67	.459	26	1	2	3	77	.527%	4	11	17
2012	138	37	54	.391	17	2	2	4	68	.492%	12	16	11
2013	156	43	56	.359	18	5	1	5	78	.500%	25	21	15
2014	133	28	53	.391	8	0	0	1	54	.398%	11	11	6
2015	131	21	50	.381	8	1	1	3	58	.442%	9	17	8
TOTALS	971	214	383	.394	90	10	9	26	458	.471%	75	95	85

== See also ==
- NCAA Division I softball career .400 batting average list
