= Tammy Williams =

American softball player

Biographical details
- Born: June 21, 1987 (age 39); Roscoe, Missouri, U.S.
- Education: Northwestern University

Playing career
- 2006–2009: Northwestern
- 2009–2015: Chicago Bandits

Coaching career (HC unless noted)
- 2009: Northern Illinois (asst.)

Accomplishments and honors

Awards
- As player: Big Ten Freshman of the Year (2006); 2× Big Ten Player of the Year (2008, 2009)

Tammy Kay Williams (born June 21, 1987) is an American, former collegiate four-time All-American, four-time professional All-Star softball player and coach. She played her natural position at shortstop from 2006 to 2009 at Northwestern, as well as the Team USA and Chicago Bandits softball team. She owns Northwestern' softball team all-time career records in batting average, home runs, hits and total bases. She helped lead the Wildcats to a national runner up finish in the 2006 Women's College World Series. Williams was drafted tenth overall by the Chicago Bandits in the 2009 NPF Draft, winning two Cowles Cup championships in 2011 and 2015. She later worked as a sports broadcaster for the Big Ten and an assistant softball coach at Northern Illinois.

== Playing career ==
=== College career ===
Williams attended Northwestern University, majoring in human development and psychological services with a minor in business institutions. She kicked off her career with freshman honors from both the NCAA Division I and the Big Ten Conference. She was named a Third Team All-American, All-Big Ten and Big Ten Freshman of the Year.

Williams broke the school season record with her 14 home runs and positioned herself within the top-5 all-time for hits and doubles, where she currently remains. On April 23, 2006, she hit a career high 4 hits vs. the Minnesota Gophers Katie Dalen.

The Wildcats made it into the Women's College World Series as the No. 4 seed and proceeded to sweep the competition in their first three games. Williams began her World Series career by going 4/6 off the Alabama Crimson Tide on June 1. In the semifinals against the No. 1 seeded UCLA Bruins, Williams hit an extra-inning home run to score the eventual winning run and send Northwestern into their first final vs. the Arizona Wildcats.

The Wildcats suffered back-to-back shutouts by Alicia Hollowell on June 5 and 6. Williams went 2/4 in the finale and was named to the All-Tournament Team hitting .333 with an RBI, HR and a slugging percentage over .450%.

For her sophomore year, Williams earned a First Team All-American citation and repeated with Big Ten honors. She broke the hits and total bases records while tanking top-5 in batting average, RBIs, home runs, doubles and slugging percentage. She currently still leads season records for her 91 hits and 155 total bases.

Beginning February 25 and ending April 8, 2007, Williams achieved a school record 24 consecutive game hit streak. She hit .500 (43/86) and produced 24 RBIs, 7 home runs, 8 doubles, 7 walks and a .837% slugging.

Her team made it back to the WCWS and once again Williams contributed by earning All-Tournament status hitting .272 with 4 RBIs on two home runs and a slugging of over .800%. They were eventually eliminated by National Collegiate Player of The Year Monica Abbott and the Tennessee Lady Vols on June 3.

Williams earned her second First Team All-American citation as well as being named Big Ten Player of the Year to go along with all-conference honors. Williams continued her trend of record breaking by posting an all-time season best batting average and on-base percentage. She ranked top-10 in hits and slugging in addition.

On February 17, 2008, Williams was named National Fastpitch Coaches Association "Player of The Week" for hitting .785 (11/14) with two RBIs, a home run, a double and slugging an 1.071%. The next month, Williams drove in a career and school and conference best 8 RBIs vs. the Minnesota Gophers combined duo of Katie Dalen and Briana Hassett on March 8. She was a perfect 3/3 at the plate and two of her hits were home runs in the 17-8 victory.

For a final season, Williams earned 2009 all-season honors and her second Big Ten Player of the Year award. She broke her own batting average record with a career best .448 total and posted top-5 records in both slugging and on-base percentages.

The Wildcat would have a career March month; for the week of March 8, Williams was again named "Player of The Week" by the NFCA; she hit .545 (6/11), drove in two runs on 5 extra base hits to slug an imposing 1.363%. On March 22 through April 1, she had 5 consecutive game home run streak (an NCAA record). In one of the games she would hit her 50th career home run off Kimi Wong of the Penn State Nittany Lions on March 29.

Williams owned the Northwestern Wildcats career records for average, home runs, runs, hits, total bases and slugging, and still does for average, homers, hits and total bases. She ranks top-5 in all others. She is a Big Ten top-10 player in virtually all the same offense categories. She started every game at shortstop during her 4-year career with the Wildcats. Williams was also named a finalist for the Lowe's Senior CLASS Award following the 2009 season.

== Professional career ==
Williams was drafted in the second round by the Chicago Bandits of the National Pro Fastpitch softball league. Following a rookie season in which she posted a .340 batting average, 6 home runs, 20 RBIs, 20 runs and a .557 slugging percentage, Williams was named "Rookie of the Year" and "Defensive Player of the Year". In 2011, Williams returned from a role with Team USA and hit .299 for the year. The Bandits made it into the Cowles Cup Championship and won their first title; Williams went 1/4 vs. pitchers Jordan Taylor, Sarah Pauly and Danielle Lawrie of the USSSA Pride. The Bandits made a return trip to the finals in 2012, though Williams was shut out at the plate, the team won 2–1 on August 25. Williams won her third Cowles Cup Championship and scored the sole winning run on August 18, 2015.

== Coaching career ==
On July 21, 2009, Williams was named an assistant coach at Northern Illinois. On January 11, 2010, she was named to the 2010 USA women's national softball team.

== Statistics ==
Northwestern Wildcats
| YEAR | G | AB | R | H | BA | RBI | HR | 3B | 2B | TB | SLG | BB | SO | SB | SBA |
| 2006 | 65 | 215 | 65 | 81 | .376 | 41 | 14 | 1 | 14 | 139 | .646% | 26 | 32 | 16 | 20 |
| 2007 | 65 | 214 | 73 | 91 | .425 | 50 | 16 | 1 | 14 | 155 | .724% | 20 | 28 | 14 | 15 |
| 2008 | 56 | 168 | 49 | 74 | .440 | 43 | 12 | 3 | 10 | 126 | .750% | 25 | 18 | 7 | 12 |
| 2009 | 46 | 143 | 48 | 64 | .447 | 37 | 15 | 0 | 11 | 120 | .839% | 20 | 10 | 10 | 12 |
| TOTALS | 232 | 740 | 235 | 310 | .419 | 171 | 57 | 5 | 49 | 540 | .729% | 91 | 88 | 47 | 59 |

NPF Chicago Bandits
| YEAR | AB | R | H | BA | RBI | HR | 3B | 2B | TB | SLG | BB | SO | SB |
| 2009 | 97 | 20 | 33 | .340 | 20 | 6 | 0 | 3 | 54 | .556% | 2 | 22 | 3 |
| 2011 | 87 | 16 | 26 | .299 | 12 | 4 | 2 | 1 | 43 | .494% | 17 | 19 | 3 |
| 2012 | 133 | 26 | 35 | .263 | 15 | 3 | 1 | 4 | 50 | .376% | 17 | 21 | 6 |
| 2013 | 159 | 32 | 58 | .365 | 21 | 5 | 0 | 11 | 86 | .541% | 10 | 19 | 11 |
| 2014 | 163 | 27 | 55 | .337 | 33 | 9 | 1 | 9 | 93 | .570% | 11 | 12 | 6 |
| 2015 | 163 | 24 | 45 | .276 | 18 | 1 | 0 | 5 | 53 | .325% | 8 | 17 | 6 |
| TOTALS | 802 | 145 | 252 | .314 | 119 | 28 | 4 | 33 | 377 | .470% | 65 | 110 | 35 |

== See also ==
- NCAA Division I softball career .400 batting average list
- NCAA Division I softball career 50 home runs list
