= Caitlin Lever =

American-Canadian softball player

Personal information
- Nationality: American / Canadian
- Born: March 12, 1985 (age 41) Morristown, New Jersey, U.S.
- Height: 5 ft 8 in (173 cm)

Sport
- Country: Canada
- Sport: Softball
- College team: Georgia Tech Yellow Jackets; Canisius Golden Griffins

Caitlin Anne Lever (born March 12, 1985) is an American-Canadian softball outfielder.

== Early life ==
Lever was born in Morristown, New Jersey, when her father Don Lever played for the New Jersey Devils of the National Hockey League (NHL). Due to her birth in the US, Lever is a dual citizen of the United States and Canada. In her youth, she played ice hockey. She graduated from the Georgia Institute of Technology in 2007. In her final year playing for the Georgia Tech Yellow Jackets softball team, she set team records for hits and on-base percentage.

== Career ==
She played for Canada at the 2008 Summer Olympics.

From 2008 to 2011, Lever played for the Chicago Bandits of National Pro Fastpitch.

== Personal ==
She currently resides in Buffalo, New York.

Her father and uncle are both former NHL players: Don Lever and Rick Ley, respectively.
