= Stacy May-Johnson =

American softball player and coach

Current position
- Title: Head coach
- Team: Iowa
- Conference: Big Ten Conference
- Record: 27–27 (.500)

Biographical details
- Born: May 15, 1984 (age 42); Reno, Nevada, U.S.
- Education: Iowa Hawkeyes

Playing career
- 2003–2006: Iowa
- 2006–2011: Chicago Bandits
- 2017–present: Chicago Bandits
- Positions: Shortstop, third base

Coaching career (HC unless noted)
- 2007: Iowa (undergrad. asst.)
- 2008–2010: Louisville (volunteer asst.)
- 2011–2014: Iowa (asst.)
- 2015–2016: Louisville (asst.)
- 2017: Purdue (asst.)
- 2018–2019: Eastern Kentucky (asst.)
- 2020–2021: Utah Valley
- 2022–2025: Fresno State
- 2026–Present: Iowa

Head coaching record
- Overall: 176–168 (.512)

Accomplishments and honors

Awards
- Big Ten All-Tournament (2005); 2× second-team All-Big Ten (2004, 2006); Big Ten Freshman of the Year (2003); First-team All-Big Ten (2003)
Medal record
Women's softball
Representing United States
Pan American Games
| Gold medal – first place | 2011 Guadalajara | Team |

Stacy May-Johnson (born Stacy Margarita May; May 15, 1984) is an American, former collegiate, three-time professional All-Star softball player and current head coach at The University of Iowa. She played college softball for Iowa, being named a three-time all-conference third baseman and shortstop. May-Johnson was selected twelfth overall in the National Pro Fastpitch, eventually playing for the Chicago Bandits. She was named the inaugural Rookie of the Year in 2006 and a two-time Player of the Year in 2008 and 2010 for the league. She also helped the Bandits to win two championships and ranks in the top-10 in career hits (267) and home runs (38).

== Career ==
=== College ===
At the University of Iowa, May-Johnson played on the Iowa Hawkeyes softball team from 2003 to 2006 at third base and shortstop. May-Johnson graduated from Iowa in May 2007 as a double major with a B.S. in physics and B.B.A. in accounting. In 2009, May-Johnson completed an M.S. in physics at the University of Louisville.

=== Professional ===
She received the MVP 2008 Professional Women's Softball League. May was drafted by the Chicago Bandits of the National Pro Fastpitch as the fourth pick in the second round. She earned the 2006 Nokona Rookie of the Year award and was also named to the all-National Pro fastpitch team.

She played for the Chicago Bandits from 2006 to 2010 and 2017 to 2018 and for the USA Softball National Team from 2011 to 2012. She was named 2011 USA Softball Female Athlete of the Year for "leading the team to gold medals at the World Cup of Softball VII in Oklahoma City and the 2011 Pan American Games in Guadalajara, Mexico". Her position as an assistant coach for the University of Louisville softball team was announced on July 14, 2014.

== Coaching career ==
In 2007, May-Johnson was an undergraduate assistant coach at Iowa. From 2008 to 2010, May-Johnson was a volunteer assistant softball coach at Louisville while a graduate student there. May-Johnson then came back to Iowa as an assistant coach from 2011 to 2014 before returning to Louisville as an assistant coach from 2015 to 2016.

May-Johnson was an assistant coach at Purdue in 2017 and at Eastern Kentucky in 2018 and 2019.

On December 30, 2019, May-Johnson was named the head coach at Utah Valley.

On July 6, 2021, May-Johnson was named the head coach at Fresno State.

On May 28, 2025, May-Johnson was named the head coach at Iowa.

== International career ==
May-Johnson represented the United States women's national softball team at the 2011 Pan American Games and won a gold medal.

== Personal life ==
She is married to Nate Johnson and has three children.

== Head coaching record ==
=== College ===
Record table
| Season | Team | Overall | Conference | Standing | Postseason |
|---|---|---|---|---|---|
Utah Valley Wolverines (Western Athletic Conference) (2020–2021)
| 2020 | Utah Valley | 12–7 | 0–0 | | Season canceled due to COVID-19 |
| 2021 | Utah Valley | 24–28 | 8–10 | T–4th | |
| Utah Valley: | | 36–35 (.507) | 8–10 (.444) | | |
Fresno State Bulldogs (Mountain West Conference) (2022–2025)
| 2022 | Fresno State | 19–36 | 10–14 | 5th | |
| 2023 | Fresno State | 24–31 | 10–12 | T-5th | |
| 2024 | Fresno State | 33–19 | 13–9 | T-4th | |
| 2025 | Fresno State | 37–20 | 15–7 | 3rd | |
| Fresno State: | | 113–106 (.516) | 48–42 (.533) | | |
Iowa Hawkeyes (Big Ten Conference) (2026–Present)
| 2026 | Iowa | 27–27 | 7–17 | T-12th | |
| Iowa: | | 27–27 (.500) | 7–17 (.292) | | |
| Total: | | 176–168 (.512) | | | |
National champion Postseason invitational champion Conference regular season champion Conference regular season and conference tournament champion Division regular season champion Division regular season and conference tournament champion Conference tournament champion

== Statistics ==
Iowa Hawkeyes
| YEAR | G | AB | R | H | BA | RBI | HR | 3B | 2B | TB | SLG | BB | SO | SB | SBA |
| 2003 | 59 | 197 | 30 | 71 | .360 | 38 | 6 | 1 | 17 | 108 | .548% | 9 | 10 | 4 | 4 |
| 2004 | 63 | 195 | 25 | 56 | .287 | 19 | 1 | 0 | 6 | 65 | .333% | 15 | 6 | 2 | 3 |
| 2005 | 64 | 199 | 48 | 73 | .367 | 31 | 10 | 1 | 15 | 120 | .603% | 13 | 11 | 2 | 3 |
| 2006 | 61 | 189 | 40 | 64 | .338 | 21 | 6 | 0 | 13 | 95 | .502% | 23 | 11 | 5 | 8 |
| TOTALS | 247 | 780 | 143 | 264 | .338 | 109 | 23 | 2 | 51 | 388 | .497% | 60 | 38 | 13 | 18 |
