= Shonda Stanton =

American softball coach

Current position
- Title: Head coach
- Team: Indiana
- Conference: Big Ten
- Record: 244–159 (.605)

Biographical details
- Born: Sharon, Pennsylvania, U.S.
- Education: UNC Greensboro; Ashland

Playing career
- 1992–1995: UNC Greensboro

Coaching career (HC unless noted)
- 1996–1998: Ashland (GA)
- 1999: IUPUI
- 2000–2017: Marshall
- 2018–present: Indiana

Head coaching record
- Overall: 831–614–2 (.575)

Shonda Stanton is an American softball coach who is the head coach at Indiana University.

== Coaching career ==
=== Indiana ===
On June 10, 2017, Shonda Stanton was announced as the new head coach of the Indiana softball program, replacing Michelle Gardner.

== Head coaching record ==
=== College ===
Record table
Season	Team	Overall	Conference	Standing	Postseason
IUPUI Jaguars (Mid Continent Conference) (1999–present)
1999	IUPUI	27–25	12–11	4th	
IUPUI:		27–25 (.519)	12–11 (.522)		
Marshall Thundering Herd (Mid-American Conference) (2000–2005)
2000	Marshall	25–27	13–7	T-1st (East)	
2001	Marshall	35–23	15–9	T-3rd (East)	
2002	Marshall	18–28	11–13	T-3rd (East)	
2003	Marshall	41–17	20–4	1st (East)	
2004	Marshall	31–27	12–12	5th (East)	
2005	Marshall	38–20	20–4	1st (East)	
Marshall Thundering Herd (Conference USA) (2006–2017)
2006	Marshall	33–23	15–9	2nd	
2007	Marshall	32–26	11–13	5th	
2008	Marshall	26–29	11–11	4th	
2009	Marshall	31–20	11–10	4th	
2010	Marshall	24–30–1	3–20–1	9th	
2011	Marshall	19–33–1	5–17–1	7th	
2012	Marshall	36–21	15–9	3rd	
2013	Marshall	36–22	13–10	4th	NCAA Regional
2014	Marshall	28–31	13–11	7th	
2015	Marshall	35–15	14–8	3rd (East)	
2016	Marshall	30–26	13–11	2nd (East)	
2017	Marshall	42–12	20–4	1st (East)	NCAA Regional
Marshall:		560–430–2 (.566)	235–182–2 (.563)		
Indiana Hoosiers (Big Ten Conference) (2018–Present)
2018	Indiana	26–30	17–6	3rd	
2019	Indiana	36–21	10–13	7th	
2020	Indiana	12–9	0–0		Season canceled due to COVID-19
2021	Indiana	25–19	25–19	5th	
2022	Indiana	27–22	10–13	10th	
2023	Indiana	44–18	18–5	2nd	NCAA Regional
2024	Indiana	40–20	12–11	T-6th	NCAA Regional
2025	Indiana	34–20	10–12	T-10th	NCAA Regional
2026	Indiana	41–13	17–7	4th	
Indiana:		285–172 (.624)	119–86 (.580)		
Total:		872–614–2 (.587)			
National champion Postseason invitational champion Conference regular season champion Conference regular season and conference tournament champion Division regular season champion Division regular season and conference tournament champion Conference tournament champion
