= Vicky Galindo =

American softball player (born 1983)

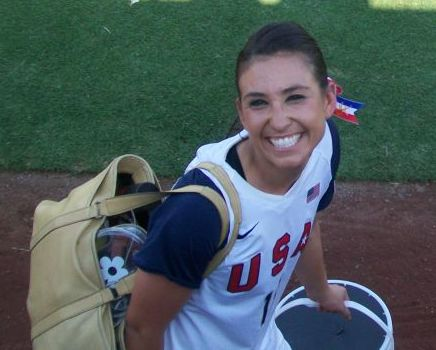

Current position
- Title: Head coach
- Team: West Valley
- Conference: Coast

Biographical details
- Born: December 22, 1983 (age 42); Union City, California, U.S.

Playing career
- 2002: West Valley
- 2003–2005: California
- 2005–2007: Chicago Bandits
- 2009–2013: Chicago Bandits
- Positions: Third base, second base

Coaching career (HC unless noted)
- 2006: California (undergrad. asst.)
- 2007–2009: San Jose State (asst.)
- 2010–present: West Valley

Medal record

Women's softball

Representing United States

Olympic Games
Silver medal – second place	2008 Beijing	Team competition

Victoria Noel Galindo-Piatt (born December 22, 1983), commonly known as Vicky Galindo, is an American, former collegiate All-American, medal-winning Olympian, three-time professional All-Star, softball player and current head coach at West Valley College. An infielder at second and third, Galindo played college softball at West Valley and later for California in the Pac-12 Conference, helping them to back-to-back national runner-up finishes at the 2003 and 2004 Women's College World Series. She was drafted to the Chicago Bandits of National Pro Fastpitch (NPF) winning two championships. She also played for the United States women's national softball team, winning a silver medal at the 2008 Summer Olympics.

== Career ==
Galindo played for the University of California, Berkeley Golden Bears from 2003–2005 and for West Valley Junior College for the 2002 season. She was an undergrad assistant at Cal in 2006. Galindo was on the US national team from 2005-2007. She was also the assistant coach for the San Jose State in 2007. In 2009 she took the head coaching position at West Valley College and became an associate faculty member. She was hired full time in 2014, and teaches in the Kinesiology Department as the lead Pilates certificate instructor. She went to high school at James Logan High School in Union City, California where she graduated in 2001. Galindo started playing at age 4 when her dad coached her brother's baseball team. There was an extra jersey and he told her to go play.

She was inducted to the Cal Hall of Fame in 2015, and her Jersey was retired in 2013 from the NPF Chicago Bandits.

== Personal life ==
In 2014, she married Eddie Piatt. The couple have three children together.

== James Logan High School ==
Vicky was the 2001 Best All Around Female Athlete her senior year.

She was inducted into the James Logan Hall of Fame in 2009, and her softball jersey was retired in 2012.

== Statistics ==
California Golden Bears
YEAR	G	AB	R	H	BA	RBI	HR	3B	2B	TB	SLG	BB	SO	SB	SBA
2003	68	225	39	73	.324	21	1	4	5	89	.395%	15	22	19	23
2004	66	222	53	83	.374	20	7	2	18	126	.567%	19	25	23	32
2005	55	176	49	57	.324	16	4	3	11	86	.488%	9	19	19	23
TOTALS	189	623	141	213	.342	57	12	9	34	301	.483%	43	66	61	78

Team USA Olympic Games
YEAR	G	AB	R	H	BA	RBI	HR	3B	2B	TB	SLG	BB	SO	SB
2008	5	5	1	3	.600	1	0	0	1	4	.800%	0	1	0

== College Softball ==
2002
Freshman Year

- Led West Valley Junior College to the state championship title
- Earned All-American honors
- First team all-league
  - .510 batting average

2003
Sophomore Year

- Named to the All-CWS tournament team
- All-region recognition after hitting .462 (6-13)
- Garnered All-Pacific Region second team honors
  - Second among Bears in hitting, posting a .324 average
- 73 hits were the fifth highest total among Pac-10 players
- Posted 19 regular season multi-hit games

2004
Junior Year

- Member of USA Schutt Elite Team at Canada Cup and Champions Cup
  - Hit .415 (22-53) with 12 runs and a team-high five doubles and 12 RBI
- Led the Cal Bears to the WCWS runner-up
- Second team All-Pac-10
- First team All-American
- First team All Pacific Region

2005
Senior Year

- Led the Cal Bears to the Women's College World Series
- Pac-10 Conference Honors
- First-Team All-American

== US National Team ==
2005

- International Sports Invitational Champion
  - Hit. 889
- Gold medalist at Pan Am qualifier
- Silver medalist at World Cup
  - Hit .455 (5-11) for a team-high seven RBI
- Silver medalist at Japan Cup
  - Hit .273 (3-11) with one RBI

2006

- Undergrad assistant for Cal Bears
- Gold Medalist at World Cup of Softball

2007

- Assistant Coach at San Jose State
- Gold medalist at World Cup.

Note: she batted .467 (7-15) for Team USA in the 2007 World Cup where she has played in all but one game. She appeared as a pinch runner for Crystl Bustos in the game she did not start.
