= Charlotte Morgan (softball) =

American softball coach (born 1988)

- Morgan in 2010

Current position
- Title: Head coach
- Team: Fresno State
- Conference: Mountain West

Biographical details
- Born: June 5, 1988 (age 37); Riverside, California, U.S.

Playing career
- 2007–2010: Alabama
- 2010–2012: USSSA Pride
- 2013–2014: Akron Racers
- Position: Pitcher/utility

Coaching career (HC unless noted)
- 2011–2013: Maryland (pitching)
- 2014–2015: Georgia Tech (pitching)
- 2016–2017: Oklahoma State (pitching)
- 2018–2020: UT Arlington (asst.)
- 2021–2025: Cal State Northridge
- 2026–present: Fresno State

Accomplishments and honors

Championships
- SEC regular season (2010); SEC tournament (2010)

Awards
- Second-team NFCA All-American (2010); First-team NFCA All-American (2009); Women's College World Series All-Tournament (2009); 2× SEC Player of the Year (2009, 2010); 3× first-team All-SEC (2008–2010); Second-team All-SEC (2007)

Charlotte Lee Morgan (born June 5, 1988) is an American former professional softball pitcher and current head coach for Fresno State. She played college softball for Alabama from 2007 to 2010, where she is the career leader for the school in RBIs, also ranking top-15 in the NCAA Division I. She was also named a four-time all-conference honoree and twice named SEC Player of the Year. Morgan was the No. 1 draft pick in the 2010 National Pro Fastpitch Senior Draft, beginning her career with The USSSA Pride based in Kissimmee, Florida, winning a title in 2010. In 2020, Morgan was named the head coach of the California State University, Northridge softball team after previously working at several colleges as a pitching coach. She was named head coach at Fresno State in 2025.

== Early life and education ==
Morgan was born in Riverside, California and grew up in Moreno Valley, California. She is the daughter of Chris Morgan and Lori Morgan, with three brothers and two sisters. She started playing softball at the age of nine.

She attended Moreno Valley High School for three years and was a recognized scholar-athlete. She continued on to neighboring Valley View High School during her senior year.

In 2003, as a freshman in high school, Morgan received first-team All-League honors, as well as first-team Team All-County honors in softball. She was honored as the league MVP and Rookie of the Year. In addition to softball, Morgan played basketball and was named Outstanding Basketball Player and team MVP on the 2003 league championship team.

In 2004, in her sophomore year, Morgan continued playing softball and was named a first-team All-League honoree. In 2005, as a junior in high school, Morgan received second-team All-League honors in softball.

In 2006, as a senior at Valley View High School, Morgan was a first-team All-League honoree, earned first-team Team All-County honors, as well as Athlete of the Year and the league's Most Valuable Player. She graduated magna cum laude, finishing 13th in her class.

=== College softball career ===
Morgan attended the University of Alabama, choosing Alabama over both UCLA and Texas. Morgan was one of the most highly decorated incoming freshman in Crimson Tide softball history.

In 2009 and 2010, Morgan was named the Southeastern Conference (SEC) Player of the Year, becoming the second player in SEC history to receive this honor twice in her career. She has made the first-team All-SEC for the 2010 season.

During her collegiate career, Morgan earned athletic awards including the USA Softball Collegiate Player of the Year Top 10 finalist and ESPN Magazine's Academic third-team All-American. Morgan ended the 2010 regular season with a 7–2 pitching record and a .350 batting average as well as leading the team with 16 home runs. Morgan was a key player for the University of Alabama's offense, becoming the first player in Crimson Tide's history with three 50 or more RBI seasons.

She led Alabama in all three major hitting categories in her final season, pacing the Tide with a .406 batting average, 11 home runs and 59 RBI. She also led the team with a .673 slugging percentage and a .505 on-base percentage.

In 2010, Morgan received the Lowe's Senior CLASS Award. The honor is presented annually to the most outstanding senior player in NCAA Division I softball. The recipient is chosen by a nationwide vote of Division I softball coaches, media, and fans. The announcement and presentation was June 3, 2010, during the opening day of the NCAA Women's College World Series in Oklahoma City.

=== College career statistics ===
Alabama Crimson Tide
YEAR	W	L	GP	GS	CG	SHO	SV	IP	H	R	ER	BB	SO	ERA	WHIP
2007	8	2	14	7	3	1	1	52.1	50	27	17	12	42	2.28	1.19
2008	18	2	22	17	7	4	0	104.1	83	25	19	17	69	1.28	0.96
2009	18	6	31	22	13	6	1	144.0	119	41	37	21	124	1.80	0.97
2010	7	2	19	17	5	1	0	89.0	100	54	45	21	59	3.54	1.36
TOTALS	51	12	86	63	28	12	2	389.2	352	147	118	71	294	2.12	1.08

Alabama Crimson Tide
YEAR	G	AB	R	H	BA	RBI	HR	3B	2B	TB	SLG	BB	SO	SB	SBA
2007	65	165	37	59	.357	52	11	0	8	100	.606%	26	12	8	9
2008	65	192	46	80	.416	79	19	0	19	156	.812%	23	18	3	3
2009	61	165	30	67	.406	59	11	0	11	111	.672%	28	14	0	0
2010	63	154	44	56	.363	74	17	1	11	120	.779%	57	19	3	3
TOTALS	254	676	157	262	.387	264	58	1	49	487	.720%	134	63	14	15

== Professional softball career ==
On February 10, 2010, the National Pro Fastpitch Senior Draft was held. Morgan was the first player chosen, thereby beginning her professional softball career with the USSSA Florida Pride. She was the highest draft pick ever from among members of the Crimson Tide, and the eighth player in Alabama history to be drafted in the professional league.

Following the draft, Morgan stated, "It is an honor to be able to have the opportunity to further my career. To be able to play professionally has always been a goal of mine. I wouldn't be in this position if it weren't for the coaching staff and my teammates at Alabama.

Upon joining the Akron Racers in June 2013 Morgan stated, “I am really excited and blessed to be able to join the Akron Racers family,” commented Morgan. “Ready to help in any way to lead us to a championship this year.”

== Coaching career ==
Morgan was an assistant pitching coach at Maryland from 2011 to 2013 and at Georgia Tech from 2014 to 2015. From 2016 to 2017, she was pitching coach at Oklahoma State. After two seasons at Oklahoma State, Morgan became an assistant at UT Arlington. In December 2020, Morgan was announced as the new softball coach at California State University, Northridge.

=== Head coaching record ===
Statistics overview
Season	Team	Overall	Conference	Standing	Postseason
Cal State Northridge Matadors (Big West Conference) (2021–present)
2021	Cal State Northridge	6–20	4–20	9th	
2022	Cal State Northridge	24–30	14–13	T-6th	
2023	Cal State Northridge	28–24	19–8	3rd	
2024	Cal State Northridge	25–26	9–18	9th	
2025	Cal State Northridge	26–26	17–10	2nd	
Cal State Northridge:		109–126 (.464)	63–69 (.477)		
Total:		109–126 (.464)			
National champion Postseason invitational champion Conference regular season champion Conference regular season and conference tournament champion Division regular season champion Division regular season and conference tournament champion Conference tournament champion
