= Chicago Bandits =

American women's softball team

- Logo

Information
- League: National Pro Fastpitch (2005–2021); Athletes Unlimited Softball League (2025–present)
- Location: Rosemont, Illinois
- Ballpark: Parkway Bank Sports Complex (2011–2021, 2026–present)
- Founded: 2005
- Post-season championships: 4 (2008, 2011, 2015, 2016)
- Regular season champion: 6 (2005, 2006, 2008, 2009, 2013, 2019)
- Former ballparks: Village of Lisle-Benedictine University Sports Complex (2005–2007); Judson Softball Complex (2008–2010)
- Colors: Light blue, white, black, red
- Mascot: Swiper (raccoon)
- Retired numbers: 2, 5, 6, 12, 19, 27
- General manager: Jenny Dalton-Hill
- Coach: Shonda Stanton

The Chicago Bandits are a women's professional softball team based in Rosemont, Illinois. Founded in 2005, they originally played as a member of National Pro Fastpitch (NPF). The Bandits won the 2008 NPF championship, defeating the Washington Glory in the final game of the championship series. The team won their second NPF championship following the 2011 season when they won the championship series two games to none over the USSSA Pride. Following the 2015 season the team won its third NPF championship defeating the USSSA Pride two games to none. The team plays their home games at Parkway Bank Sports Complex in Rosemont, Illinois. The team originally folded in 2021 when the NPF disbanded, but resumed operations as part of the Athletes Unlimited Softball League (AUSL) in 2025, playing as a traveling team until permanently returning to the Chicago metropolitan area in 2026.

== USA Softball players ==
- Jennie Finch
- Victoria Galindo
- Eileen Canney
- Tammy Williams
- Amber Patton
- Ashley Holcombe
- Kristal Perez
- Natalie Hernandez

== Franchise history ==
=== National Pro Fastball ===
2005

The Chicago Bandits' inaugural season took place at Benedictine University in Lisle, Illinois. Chicago recorded an NPF-best 41–7 record, but lost to the Akron Racers in the championship.

2006

Chicago posted a 30–12 record, which again was best in the NPF, but lost to the Connecticut Brakettes in the championship series.

2007

The 2007 Chicago Bandits went 23–21, but failed to qualify for the playoffs after finishing in sixth place in the league.

2008

The Bandits began their first season in Elgin with a 4–7 record, playing without Jennie Finch and Vicky Galindo of the United States National Team, and Caitlin Lever of the Canadian National Team, due to the 2008 Beijing Olympics.

Jessica Sallinger and Kristina Thorson each won 12 games and were Chicago's first duo to record double-digit victories since Jennie Finch and Amy Harre in 2005. After moving to their new stadium, the Bandits recorded 61 home runs in 2008, which was more home runs than in the franchise's first three years combined. The team's home run leaders were Stacy May (13), Rachel Folden (11), Jamie Clark (11)

The Bandits completed their season sweeping the Akron Racers, New England Riptide and Rockford Thunder to finish the regular season 32-16 and on a 12-game winning streak, earning the highest seed in the 2008 Championship Series.

In the Championship Series, Chicago won all three games and earned the franchise's first NPF Championship with a victory over the Washington Glory in the title game.

2009

The Chicago Bandits began their second season at Judson University in Elgin, Illinois, with the return of Olympians Jennie Finch, Vicky Galindo, and Caitlin Lever. Chicago finished the regular season with a 27–12 record, ranking first in the National Pro Fastpitch standings and earning the top seed for the playoffs in Akron, Ohio.

Despite having the best record in the NPF in 2009, Chicago was upset in the NPF playoffs by the USSSA Pride two games to one, and lost the opportunity to repeat as league champions.

2010

In 2010, the Bandits once again won the regular season title; but once again, the USSSA Pride ended the Bandits championship hopes, winning their first Cowles Cup title.

After the season, standouts Stacy May-Johnson and Jennie Finch announced their retirements from professional softball.

2011

The Bandits moved into their brand new home stadium, Ballpark at Rosemont, in Rosemont, Illinois in time for the beginning of the 2011 season. The team officially opened the stadium for NPF play on June 16, 2011, with a ribbon-cutting ceremony prior to the Bandits 1–0 walk-off win over the USSSA Pride. Caitlin Lever drove in the winning run in the bottom of the 7th.

Unlike the previous three years, the Bandits did not win the regular season title. They finished third in the four-team NPF with a 20–20 record, after losing six of their final eight games at home to close out the regular season.

The Bandits opened the playoffs in Sulphur, LA against the second-seeded Akron Racers, and swept the Racers with two straight victories, capped off by a three-run walk-off home run in extra innings by Nikki Nemitz to advance to the finals.

In the finals, they once again met the Pride. In the first game, the Pride took an early 2–0 lead, but rookie Megan Wiggins hit a three-run double off Pride starter Cat Osterman. Two pitches later, Osterman went down with an arm injury, but the Pride came back to tie the game at 3 in the bottom of the 7th. In the 8th, Bandits right-fielder Amber Patton drove in the go-ahead run, and NPF Co-Pitcher of the Year Monica Abbott made it stand up for a one-game lead in the best-of-three series.

The next afternoon, Chicago got on the board early and often, scoring five times in the bottom of the first. The Pride got two back, but that was as close as they would get the rest of the day, as the Bandits cruised to their second Cowles Cup championship with a 10–3 victory. They became the first NPF team to win multiple Cowles Cup championships.

2015

Before the season, the Bandits signed 2015 draftees shortstop Sammy Marshall of Western Illinois signed with the Bandits. and outfielder Brenna Moss of Fresno State AJ Andrews of LSU signed with the Bandits on June 12.

After tryouts, the Bandits signed free agents infielder Megan Blank of the Iowa Hawkeyes, outfielder Kelsi Jones of Louisville, catcher Vicky Galasso of Idaho State, and pitcher Lacey Waldrop of Florida State.

2016

The Bandits announced an agreement with radio station 1590 WCGO to broadcast all Bandits home and road games for the 2016 season.

After finishing the regular season with a 23–25 record (the first sub-.500 regular season in franchise history), the Bandits won their second consecutive Cowles Cup title, and fourth overall in franchise history, defeating the USSSA Pride 2–1 in a winner-take-all game three of the Championship Series finals.

2017

Head coach Mike Steuerwald stepped down and became assistant general manager of the Scrap Yard Dawgs.

On February 1, the Village of Rosemont announced it would be assuming ownership of the Bandits from previous owner Bill Sokolis. The transaction included a $50,000 licensing fee paid to the NPF. Rosemont employee Toni Calmeyn will take over as general manager and will hire a new head coach.

Later that month the Bandits hired University of Florida assistant coach Sharonda McDonald as their head coach. McDonald was an All-NPF player, playing with the Philadelphia Force in 2007 and 2008, the Racers from 2010 to 2012, and 2014 with the USSSA Pride. Later, Chicago hired as their assistant coach Kyla Holas, who coached University of Houston from 1999 to 2016. On June 8, the Bandits announced the hiring of Grinnell College alumna Annie Smith as assistant coach.

2018

The Bandits announced that McDonald will not return for the 2018 season. On September 19, they announced that their new coach would be Olympian medalist and NCAA champion Stacey Nuveman Deniz. Nuveman Deniz held the NCAA home run record of 90 from 2002 to 2015, when Lauren Chamberlain broke it. She played in the NPF for the Arizona Heat in 2005.

=== Athletes Unlimited ===
The team was re-introduced by Athletes Unlimited in 2025 during the inaugural season of the Athletes Unlimited Softball League (AUSL). The franchise was brought to life again with new colors, although the team was officially referred to as the Bandits for the season before re-adopting the full Chicago Bandits identity for the 2026 season.

== General managers ==
- Aaron M. Moore (2009–2016)
- Toni Calmeyn (2017–?)
- Jenny Dalton-Hill (2025–present)

== All-time head coaches ==
Name	Term	Regular season				Playoffs			
Name	Term	GC	W	L	W%	GC	W	L	W%
Eugene Lenti (Note: Co-manager/head coach alongside Mickey Dean.)	2005–c. 2006	90	71	19	.789	3	1	2	.333
Mickey Dean	2005–2010	271	183	88	.675	14	8	6	.571
Darrick Brown	2011	40	20	20	.500	4	4	0	1.000
Keith Berg (Note: Nominally associate head coach but assumed head coach duties.)	2012	44	25	19	.568	3	3	0	1.000
Mike Steuerwald (Note: Officially named head coach in 2014.)	2012–2016	236	145	91	.614	19	13	6	.684
Sharonda McDonald	2017	49	25	24	.510	2	0	2	.000
Stacey Nuveman-Deniz	2018, 2025	71	52	19	.732	5	0	5	.000
Lauren Lappin	2019	45	38	7	.844	3	0	3	.000
Shonda Stanton	2026–present	–	–	–	TBD	–	–	–	TBD

== Season-by-season ==
Season records
Season	W	L	T	Finish	Playoff results
2005	41	7	0	1st place National Pro Fastpitch	Regular Season Champions, Lost to Akron Racers in NPF Championship
2006	30	12	0	1st place National Pro Fastpitch	Regular Season Champions, Lost to Connecticut Brakettes in NPF Championship
2007	23	21	0	6th place National Pro Fastpitch	Did not qualify
2008	32	16	0	1st place National Pro Fastpitch	Won NPF Championship (Defeated Washington Glory)
2009	27	12	0	1st place National Pro Fastpitch	Regular Season Champions, Lost to USSSA Pride 2 games to 1 in first round of NPF playoffs
2010	30	20	0	1st place National Pro Fastpitch	Regular Season Champions, Lost to USSSA Pride in NPF Championship
2011	20	20	0	3rd place National Pro Fastpitch	Won NPF Championship (Defeated Akron Racers 2–0 in Semi-finals, Defeated USSSA Pride 2–0 in Finals)
2012	25	19	0	2nd place National Pro Fastpitch	Won Game 1 of NPF Championship series over USSSA Pride (Defeated Carolina Diamonds 2–0 in Semi-finals, Finals were rained out)
2013	36	12	0	1st place National Pro Fastpitch	Regular Season Champions, Lost to USSSA Pride in NPF Championship
2014	30	18	0	2nd place National Pro Fastpitch	Lost to Akron Racers 2 games to 1 in first round of NPF playoffs
2015	31	17	0	2nd place National Pro Fastpitch	Won NPF Championship 2 games to 0 over USSSA Pride, Defeated Akron Racers 2 games to 0 in NPF Semifinals
2016	23	25	0	3rd place National Pro Fastpitch	Won NPF Championship 2 games to 1 over USSSA Pride, Defeated Scrap Yard Dawgs 2 games to 1 in NPF Semifinals
2017	25	24	0	4th place National Pro Fastpitch	Lost to USSSA Pride 2 games to 0 in first round of NPF playoffs
2018	37	10	0	2nd place National Pro Fastpitch	Lost to USSSA Pride 3 games to 0 in NPF Finals
2019	38	7	0	1st place National Pro Fastpitch	Lost to USSSA Pride 3 games to 0 in NPF Finals
2025	15	9	0	2nd place Athletes Unlimited Softball League	Lost to Talons 2 games to 0 in AUSL Championship Series
Totals	463	249	0		

== Moments ==
- July 16, 2009, Jennie Finch pitches a perfect game for the Chicago Bandits in a 3–0 win against the Philadelphia Force.
- July 27, 2009, the Chicago Bandits played the Schaumburg Flyers of the Frontier League men's baseball team in what was dubbed as Battle of the Sexes 2. The game was played at Schaumburg's Alexian Field under softball rules. The Bandits won 4–2 before an Alexian Field record crowd of 8,918. The game was considered a success even though the original tennis match between Billie Jean King and Bobby Riggs garnered much more national press attention. For this event, the Chicago Bandits received the most press coverage than in the previous years despite winning the 2008 NPF league championship and playing with Jennie Finch. Just a few years earlier, the USA's best softball players played a team of MLB All Stars with that game televised on national television.
- July 9, 2010, Jennie Finch pitches a perfect game for the Chicago Bandits against the Akron Racers at Silver Cross Field in Joliet, Ill. Finch struck out 11 batters en route to a 2–0 win.
- August 21, 2011, The Bandits defeat the USSSA Pride 10–3 in Sulphur, LA to clinch their second NPF Cowles Cup championship. They are the first team in NPF history to win multiple Cowles Cup titles.
- August 15, 2015, The Bandits rode the left arm of Monica Abbott to a second-consecutive 1–0 victory in the NPF Championship Series finals over the USSSA Pride in Hoover, AL to clinch the franchise's third Cowles Cup championship. They are now tied with the Pride for most NPF titles at 3.

== Retired numbers ==
The Bandits have retired the numbers of six players:

Player	Jersey
Tammy Williams	2
Stacy May	5
Laura Harms	6
Amber Patton	12
Vicky Galindo	19
Jennie Finch	27

== Players ==
Chicago Bandits roster
Pitchers: 3 Odicci Alexander; 11 Emiley Kennedy; 8 Lexi Kilfoyl; 82 Taylor McQuillin; -- Kathryn Sandercock; Catchers: 92 Mary Iakopo; Outfielders: -- Jocelyn Alo; -- Jessica Clements; 6 Bella Dayton; 18 Morgan Zerkle	Infielders: 21 Erin Coffel; 17 Skylar Wallace; -- Sami Williams; Utility
Reference: Updated: January 13, 2026

Bandits coaching staff
- Jenny Dalton-Hill (General manager)
- Shonda Stanton (Head coach)

Achievements
Preceded by Texas Thunder; 2004	NPF Regular Season Champions; Chicago Bandits; 2005, 2006	Succeeded by Washington Glory; 2007
Preceded by Washington Glory; 2007	Cowles Cup NPF Champions; Chicago Bandits; 2008	Succeeded by Rockford Thunder; 2009
Preceded by Washington Glory; 2007	NPF Regular Season Champions; Chicago Bandits; 2008, 2009, 2010	Succeeded by USSSA Pride; 2011
Preceded by USSSA Florida Pride; 2010	Cowles Cup NPF Champions; Chicago Bandits; 2011	Succeeded by USSSA Florida Pride; 2013 and 2014
Preceded by USSSA Pride; 2012	NPF Regular Season Champions; Chicago Bandits; 2013	Succeeded by USSSA Pride; 2014
Preceded by USSSA Florida Pride; 2013 and 2014	Cowles Cup NPF Champions; Chicago Bandits; 2015 and 2016	Succeeded by Scrap Yard Dawgs; 2017
Preceded by USSSA Pride; 2018	NPF Regular Season Champions; Chicago Bandits; 2019	Incumbent
