= Carolina Diamonds =

Women's softball team from Charlotte, North Carolina

- Logo

Information
- League: National Pro Fastpitch
- Location: Charlotte, North Carolina
- Ballpark: Various venues in North Carolina for 2012
- Founded: 2004
- Folded: 2013
- Cowles Cup championships: 1 (2009)
- Regular season champion: 1 (2004)
- Former name: Texas Thunder, Rockford Thunder, Tennessee Diamonds, NPF Diamonds
- Colors: lime green, black, silver
- Ownership: Amelia Nemeth
- Management: Alan Demaske - GM (2012)
- Manager: Lisa Navas - Interim Head Coach (2012)

The Carolina Diamonds, formerly known as the NPF Diamonds, Tennessee Diamonds, Rockford Thunder and Texas Thunder, was a women's softball team based in Charlotte, North Carolina. Since the 2004 season, they have played as a member of National Pro Fastpitch (NPF). They were known as the Texas Thunder from 2004 to 2006, the Rockford Thunder from 2007 to 2009, and the Tennessee Diamonds in 2010. They relocated to Charlotte, North Carolina in 2012.

The Thunder won the 2009 Cowles Cup Championship of NPF by defeating the USSSA Pride in the championship game held in Akron, Ohio on August 23, 2009.

In February 2013, it was announced that the team had folded and the roster would now be picked up by the NPF expansion team, the New York/New Jersey Comets.

== 2012 roster ==
Carolina Diamonds Roster
Active Roster	Coaching Staff
Pitchers: 5 Sharon Palma; 7 Katie Burkhart; 15 Angel Bunner; 20 Danielle Spaulding; 24 Morgan Melloh; 27 Sara Plourde; Catchers: 10 Amy Hooks; 22 Brittany McKinney; 25 Rachel Folden; Infielders: 3 Gionna DiSalvatore; 16 Natalie Villarreal; 18 Kelsi Weseman, 28 Bianca Mejia; 47 Amanda Kamekona; Outfielders: 2 Jami Lobpries; 8 Angeline Quiocho; 9 Caitlin Lever; 88 Annie Lockwood	Manager Coaches: -- Lisa Navas - Interim Head Coach; -- Miranda Ervin - Interim Assistant Coach; Disabled list; ‡ Inactive list; >§ Suspended list

== Season-by-season results ==
Season	Win	Loss	Win %	Finish	Playoffs
2004	41	17	.707	1st	—
2005	35	12	.745	3rd	—
2006	21	27	.438	5th	—
2007	24	20	.545	5th	—
2008	18	30	.375	6th	—
2009	19	21	.475	3rd	Won NPF Championship vs USSSA Pride
2010	16	33	.327	4th	Lost semi-finals vs Chicago Bandits, 0–2
2011	6	32	.158	4th	—
Totals	180	192	.484	—	—

== 2011 roster ==
2011 NFP Diamonds roster
Pitchers: 0 Kelsi Dunne; 11 Megan Gibson; 22 Rhiannon Kliesing; 21 Morgan Melloh; 20 Danielle Spaulding	Catchers: 10 Brittany McKinney; 12 Brittany Hile; Infielders: 33 Gionna DiSalvatore; 4 Brianna Hesson; 17 Loryn Johnson; 28 Biannca Mejia; 3 Aja Paculba; 8 Angeline Quiocho; -- Kristin Schnake	Outfielders: 7 Angela Findlay; 2 Jami Lobpries; 19 Jessica Bachkora	Manager: Tim Kiernan; Coaches

Achievements
New championship	NPF Regular Season Champions; Texas Thunder; 2004	Succeeded by Chicago Bandits; 2005
Preceded by Chicago Bandits; 2008	Cowles Cup NPF Champions; Rockford Thunder; 2009	Succeeded by USSSA Florida Pride; 2010
