= USSSA Pride =

American softball team

- Logo

Information
- League: National Pro Fastpitch (2009–2019); Independent (2020–2021); Women's Professional Fastpitch (2022–)
- Location: Viera, Florida
- Ballpark: USSSA Space Coast Complex
- Founded: 2009
- Cowles Cup championships: 2010, 2013, 2014, 2018, 2019
- Regular season champion: 2011, 2012, 2014, 2015, 2016, 2017, 2018
- Colors: Navy, red, silver, white
- Retired numbers: 8, 26
- General manager: Don DeDonatis
- Coach: Kelly Kretschman
- Website: usssapride.com

The USSSA Pride was a professional softball team based in Viera, Florida, and a former member of Women's Professional Fastpitch (WPF). Founded in 2009, they previously played in National Pro Fastpitch (NPF) from 2009 to 2019. They play their home games at USSSA Space Coast Complex.

The team was established to replace the folded Washington Glory, who played in NPF from 2007 to 2008. They are organized by the United States Specialty Sports Association (USSSA). The Pride won the Cowles Cup championship in 2010, 2013, 2014, 2018 and 2019.

== History ==
=== 2015 - 2019 ===
Of their selections in the 2015 NPF Draft, the Pride signed All-American and 2013 Big 12 Player of the Year Shelby Pendley of Oklahoma, two-time All-American and Atlantic Coast Conference (ACC) Player of the Year Emilee Koerner of Notre Dame, and All-American and 2012 Pac-12 Player of the Year Amber Freeman of Arizona State. All-time NCAA Division I homerun champion Lauren Chamberlain signed a three-year deal.

The Pride also signed free agent All-American Chelsea Goodacre of Arizona.

Caitlin Lowe announced her retirement as a player after the 2014 season. Subsequently, the Pride announced that Lowe would be inducted into the USSSA Hall of Fame, and that her jersey number 26 would be retired.

In 2017, the Pride announced that former player and assistant coach Megan Willis was promoted to assistant general manager.

USSSA purchased Space Coast Stadium and announced renovations to make it a center for amateur softball and baseball with 15 fields. It became the Pride's new home stadium, beginning in 2017.

At the Pride's first home game at USSSA Space Coast Stadium, played on June 8, 2017, the team announced that it had retired legendary pitcher Cat Osterman's jersey number "8," commemorating it with a banner on the outfield fence.

In 2018, the Pride announced Mike Stith, the head coach of the OC BatBusters, would be their coach for 2018. His assistants were Cody Dent, volunteer assistant coach of the Florida Gators softball team, and Andrea Duran, Olympic medalist and former Pride player.

On September 13, 2019, the Pride announced they would not renew their partnership with National Pro Fastpitch (NPF) for the 2020 season.

=== 2020 - present ===
On September 30, 2021, the Pride announced they are joining the WPF - Women's Professional Fastpitch league for the 2022 exhibition season. They played in the 2023 Women's Professional Fastpitch season, the inaugural season of the league, where they were crowned Runners-Up against the Texas Smoke.

They declined to continue participation in the WPF for the 2024 season and ceased operations.

== General managers ==
- Don DeDonatis (-present)

== All-time head coaches ==
#	Name	Term	Regular season				Playoffs			
#	Name	Term	GC	W	L	W%	GC	W	L	W%
1	Gerry Glasco	2014	48	33	15	.688	4	4	0	1.000
2	Mike Davenport	2015	48	34	14	.708	4	2	2	.500
3	Lonni Alameda	2016-17	99	77	22	.778	10	6	4	.600
4	Mike Stith	2018	47	42	5	.894				

== Season-by-season ==
Season records
Season	W	L	T	Finish	Playoff results
2009	16	24	0	4th place National Pro Fastpitch	Lost in NPF Semifinals
2010	28	20	0	2nd place National Pro Fastpitch	Won NPF Championship
2011	30	9	0	1st place National Pro Fastpitch	Lost in NPF Finals
2012	31	12	0	1st place National Pro Fastpitch	Faced Chicago Bandits in NPF Finals
2013	34	14	0	2nd place National Pro Fastpitch	Won NPF Championship
2014	33	15	0	1st place National Pro Fastpitch	Won NPF Championship
2015	34	14	0	1st place National Pro Fastpitch	Lost to Chicago Bandits in NPF Finals
2016	37	13	0	1st place National Pro Fastpitch	Lost to Chicago Bandits in NPF Finals
2017	40	9	0	1st place National Pro Fastpitch	Lost to Scrap Yard Dawgs in NPF Finals
2018	42	5	0	1st place National Pro Fastpitch	Won NPF Championship
2019	32	13	0	2nd place National Pro Fastpitch	Won NPF Championship
2023	18	16	0	3rd Place Women's Professional Fastpitch	Lost to Texas Smoke in WPF Finals
Totals	375	164	0		

== Retired numbers ==
The Pride has retired two jerseys:

- Cat Osterman 8
- Caitlin Lowe 26

== Current players ==
USSSA Pride roster
Active roster (YYYY = Final season of player contract)		Inactive roster	Coaches
Pitchers: 1 Odicci Alexander; 3 Samantha Show; 4 Alesha Ocasio; 13 Megan Good; 16 Jessica Burroughs; 24 Jailyn Ford	Catchers: 27 Sahvanna Jaquish; 77 Chelsea Goodacre; Infielders: 2 Shelby Pendley; 17 Shay Knighten; 30 Jessie Warren; Outfielders: 10 Haley Cruse-Mitchell; 18 Amanda Lorenz; 33 Alyssa Palomino-Cardoza		Legend: * Franchise Player Tag; (C) Captain; (A) Alternate captain; → All NPF rosters

Achievements
Preceded by Rockford Thunder; 2009	Cowles Cup NPF Champions; USSSA Pride; 2010	Succeeded by Chicago Bandits; 2011
Preceded by Chicago Bandits; 2010	NPF Regular Season Champions; USSSA Pride; 2011 and 2012	Succeeded by Chicago Bandits; 2013
Preceded by Chicago Bandits; 2011	Cowles Cup NPF Champions; USSSA Pride; 2013 and 2014	Succeeded by Chicago Bandits; 2015
Preceded by Chicago Bandits; 2013	NPF Regular Season Champions; USSSA Pride; 2014, 2015, 2016, 2017, 2018	Succeeded by Chicago Bandits; 2019
