= 2006 NPF Draft =

2006 NPF Senior Draft

General information
- Sport: softball
- Date(s): February 15, 2006

Overview
- 30 total selections
- League: National Pro Fastpitch
- Teams: 7
- First selection: Cat Osterman P Texas selected by Connecticut Brakettes
- Most selections: Philadelphia Force, Connecticut Brakettes, Akron Racers; 5 picks each
- Fewest selections: Arizona Heat, 3 picks

The 2006 NPF Senior Draft is the third annual NPF Draft. It was held February 15, 2006 to assign division I college players to pro teams for 2006 season. Athletes are not allowed by the NCAA to sign professional contracts until their collegiate seasons have ended. The first selection was Texas's Cat Osterman, picked by the Connecticut Brakettes. Osterman chose not to sign with the Brakettes. The Brakettes' rights to her expired after the 2006, after which she signed with the Rockford Thunder.

== 2006 NPF Senior Draft ==
Following are the 30 selections from the 2006 NPF Senior Draft:

Position key:
C = Catcher; UT = Utility infielder; INF = Infielder; 1B = First base; 2B =Second base SS = Shortstop; 3B = Third base; OF = Outfielder; RF = Right field; CF = Center field; LF = Left field; P = Pitcher; RHP = right-handed Pitcher; LHP = left-handed Pitcher; DP =Designated player
Positions are listed as combined for those who can play multiple positions.

^{+}	Denotes player who has been selected to at least one All-NPF team
^{#}	Denotes player who has not played in the NPF

=== Round 1 ===
Pick	Player	Pos.	NPF Team	College
1	Cat Osterman^{+}	P	Connecticut Brakettes (Note: Osterman opted not to sign with the Brakettes and signed with the Rockford Thunder after the 2006 season.)	Texas
2	Stephanie VanBrakle	P	Philadelphia Force	Alabama
3	Andrea Duran^{+}	3B	Connecticut Brakettes	UCLA
4	Kristin Vesely	OF	New England Riptide	Oklahoma
5	Alicia Hollowell	P	Arizona Heat	Arizona
6	Jennie Ritter^{#}	P	Akron Racers	Michigan
7	Emily Zaplatosch^{#}	C	Texas Thunder	UCLA
8	Caitlin Benyi	2B	Akron Racers	UCLA
9	Kristi Durant^{#}	3B/C	New England Riptide (Note: Chicago Bandits traded the pick to)	Tennessee

=== Round 2 ===
Pick	Player	Pos.	NPF Team	College
10	Sarah Fekete	OF	Philadelphia Force	Tennessee
11	Adrienne Alo	IF/OF	Connecticut Brakettes	Oregon State
12	Stacy May^{+}	3B/SS	New England Riptide (Note: New England Riptide trade from 1st round with Chicago Bandits (Chicago Bandits also gets New England Riptide’s 2007 4th round pick)	Iowa
13	Harmony Schwethelm^{#} (Note: Schwethelm signed with the Texas Charge before the 2017 season, but retired before playing.)	OF/IF	Philadelphia Force	Baylor
14	Serena Settlemier^{+}	P	Texas Thunder	Kansas
15	Sara Larquier^{+}	3B	Akron Racers	Virginia
16	Amanda Williams^{+}	OF	Chicago Bandits	Marshall

=== Round 3 ===
Pick	Player	Pos.	NPF Team	College
17	Haley Woods^{#}	C/1B	Philadelphia Force	California
18	Aimee Minor	OF	Connecticut Brakettes	Washington
19	Tiffany Stewart	OF	New England Riptide	South Florida
20	Desiree Serrano^{+}	P	Arizona Heat	Arizona State
21	Krystal Lewallen	P	Texas Thunder	Louisiana–Lafayette
22	Lindsay James^{#}	OF	Akron Racers	California
23	Lisa Allen	C	New England Riptide (Note: Chicago Bandits traded the pick to)	Oregon State

=== Round 4 ===
Pick	Player	Pos.	NPF Team	College
24	Courtnay Foster^{#}	P	Philadelphia Force	Northwestern
25	Stephanie Hill	IF/OF	Connecticut Brakettes	LSU
26	Missy Beseres	P	New England Riptide (Note: trade from 3rd round with Chicago Bandits)	Penn State
27	Lauren Lappin^{+}	IF/C	Arizona Heat	Stanford
28	Tina Boutelle^{#}	OF	Texas Thunder	Texas
29	Ashley Smith	C	Akron Racers	South Carolina
30	Jessica Williams	SS	Chicago Bandits	Marshall
