= 2007 NPF Draft =

2007 NPF College Senior Draft

General information
- Sport: softball
- Date: February 14, 2007

Overview
- 27 total selections
- League: National Pro Fastpitch
- Teams: 6
- First selection: Lindsay Schutzler SS Tennessee selected by Chicago Bandits
- Most selections: Philadelphia Force, 7 picks
- Fewest selections: Rockford Thunder, 3 picks

The 2007 NPF College Senior Draft is the fourth annual NPF Draft. It was held February 14, 2007 to assign division I college players to pro teams for 2007 season. The first selection was Tennessee's Lindsay Schutzler, picked by the Chicago Bandits. Athletes are not allowed by the NCAA to sign professional contracts until their collegiate seasons have ended.

== 2007 NPF Draft ==
Following are the 27 selections from the 2007 NPF College Senior Draft: Position key:
C = Catcher; UT = Utility infielder; INF = Infielder; 1B = First base; 2B =Second base SS = Shortstop; 3B = Third base; OF = Outfielder; RF = Right field; CF = Center field; LF = Left field; P = Pitcher; RHP = right-handed Pitcher; LHP = left-handed Pitcher; DP =Designated player
Positions are listed as combined for those who can play multiple positions.

^{+}	Denotes player who has been selected to at least one All-NPF team
^{#}	Denotes player who has not played in the NPF

=== Round 1 ===
Pick	Player	Pos.	NPF Team	College
1	Lindsay Schutzler	SS	Chicago Bandits	Tennessee
2	Eileen Canney^{+}	P	New England Riptide	Northwestern
3	Brianne McGowan^{#}	P	Philadelphia Force	Oregon State
4	Garland Cooper	1B	New England Riptide	Northwestern
5	Kristie Fox	SS	Chicago Bandits	Arizona
6	Norrelle Dickson^{+}	UT	Akron Racers	Oklahoma
7	Kellie Middleton	OF	Akron Racers	Georgia
8	Ashley DeBuhr^{#}	P	Philadelphia Force	Nebraska

=== Round 2 ===
Pick	Player	Pos.	NPF Team	College
9	Leslie Klein^{#}	OF	Philadelphia Force	LSU
10	Megan Willis^{+}	C/UT	Chicago Bandits	Texas
11	Stephanie Brown	OF	Chicago Bandits	Notre Dame
12	Monica Abbott^{+}	P	Washington Glory (Note: Chicago Bandits → Washington Glory *Pick traded from Chicago Bandits)	Tennessee
13	Kasi Carroll^{#}	P	Akron Racers	Georgia
14	Amber Jackson^{+}	UT	Washington Glory	Maryland
15	Lisa Ferguson	P	Washington Glory	Baylor

=== Round 3 ===
Pick	Player	Pos.	NPF Team	College
16	Abbie Sims	P	Rockford Thunder	North Carolina State
17	Audrey Rendon	3B	Rockford Thunder	Louisville
18	Alex Sutton	OF	New England Riptide	California
19	India Chiles	OF	Akron Racers	Tennessee
20	Chelsi Lake^{#}	IF	Washington Glory	Baylor
21	Emily Turner^{#}	P	Philadelphia Force	LSU

=== Round 4 ===
Pick	Player	Pos.	NPF Team	College
22	Megan McAllister	IF	Philadelphia Force	Georgia
23	Cassidy Scoggins	P	Rockford Thunder	Southern Illinois
24	Sharonda McDonald^{+}	OF	Philadelphia Force	Texas A&M
25	Britteny Robinson^{#}	P	Akron Racers	Kent State
26	Ashley Monceaux^{#}	1B	Washington Glory	Baylor
27	Mia Longfellow^{#}	UT	Philadelphia Force	Oregon State
