= 2008 National Pro Fastpitch season =

2008 NPF Season
- League: National Pro Fastpitch
- Sport: softball
- Duration: May 29, 2008 – August 17, 2008
- Number of teams: 6

2008 NPF Draft
- Top draft pick: Katie Burkhart; Arizona State
- Picked by: Philadelphia Force

Regular Season
- Majestic Cup (Best record): Chicago Bandits

Cowles Cup
- Champions: Chicago Bandits
- Runners-up: Washington Glory
- Finals MVP: Nicole Trimboli; Chicago Bandits

NPF seasons
- ← 2007 2009 →

The 2008 National Pro Fastpitch season was the fifth season of professional softball under the name National Pro Fastpitch (NPF) for the only professional women's fastpitch softball league in the United States. From 1997 to 2002, NPF operated under the names Women's Pro Fastpitch (WPF) and Women's Pro Softball League (WPSL). Each year, the playoff teams battle for the Cowles Cup.

== Teams, cities and stadiums ==
Team	City	Stadium
Akron Racers	Akron, Ohio	Firestone Stadium
Chicago Bandits	Elgin, Illinois (Chicago Area)	Judson University
New England Riptide	Lowell, Massachusetts	Martin Softball Field
Philadelphia Force	Allentown, Pennsylvania	ECTB Stadium
Rockford Thunder	Roscoe, Illinois	Thunder Park
Washington Glory	Dulles, Virginia	Westfield Sports Complex

National Pro Fastpitch teams

== Milestones and events ==
The Chicago Bandits started their first season in Elgin, Illinois at Judson University. The original plans were for the Bandits to play at Judson temporarily while a potential $5 million softball stadium was built nearby. Those plans did not come to fruition, and the Bandits eventually moved to a new ballpark in Rosemont, Illinois for 2011.

=== Team NPF and Bound-4-Beijing Tour ===
As part of the USA Softball Team Bound 4 Beijing Tour in preparation for the 2008 Olympics, two games were scheduled between the US Olympic softball team and a team of NPF All-Stars. The announced roster for Team NPF was:

Team NPF
Name	Position	NPF Team
Kristen Butler	C	Akron Racers
Norelle Dickson	IF	Akron Racers
Veronica Wootson	IF	Akron Racers
Jaime Clark	IF	Chicago Bandits
Kristina Thorson	P	Chicago Bandits
Jocelyn Forest	P	New England Riptide
Carri Leto Martin	IF	New England Riptide
Shanel Scott	OF	New England Riptide
Sharonda McDonald	OF	Philadelphia Force
Kellie Wilkerson	OF	Philadelphia Force
Kristen Zaleski	OF	Rockford Thunder
Desiree Serrano	P	Washington Glory
Amber Jackson	IF	Washington Glory
Savannah Brown	C	Rockford Thunder
Tonya Callahan	IF	Rockford Thunder
Megan Gibson	1B/P	Philadelphia Force
Katie Burkhart	P	Philadelphia Force

NPF veterans Monica Abbott, Cat Osterman, Kelly Kretschman, Vicky Galindo and Jennie Finch were on the Olympic team roster. Team NPF was coached by Oklahoma head softball coach Patty Gasso and private instructor Cindy Bristow. Bristow was head coach and assistant general manager of the Georgia Pride, which later became the Florida Wahoos, a team in the WPSL.

The Olympic team beat Team NPF in both games, on June 6 by a score of 10-8 and on June 14 by a score of 6-0.

On the same tour, the US Olympic team beat the Washington Glory 2-0 on May 10, and beat the Akron Racers 6-2 on July 22.

== Player acquisition ==
=== College draft ===
The 2008 NPF Senior Draft was held February 18, 2008 via conference call. First-Team All-American pitcher Katie Burkhart of Arizona State was selected first by the Philadelphia Force.

== League standings ==
Team	GP	W	L	Pct.	GB
Chicago Bandits	48	32	16	.667	-
Philadelphia Force	48	31	17	.646	1
Washington Glory	48	30	18	.625	2
New England Riptide	48	22	26	.458	10
Akron Racers	48	19	29	.396	13
Rockford Thunder	48	18	30	.375	14

In each NPF team's 48-game schedule were games against international teams, which counted in the standings. Chinese Taipei, Venezuela, Canada and the Netherlands each played at least two series against NPF teams.

== NPF Championship ==

The 2008 NPF Championship Series was held at Sunset Point Park in Kimberly, Wisconsin August 21-4. The top four teams qualified and were seeded based on the final standings. The series matched the teams up in a double-elimination bracket.

August 22 and 23, 2008
1	Chicago Bandits	4
4	New England Riptide	1
2	Philadelphia Force	7
3	Washington Glory	4
Lower round 1
L1	New England Riptide	2
L2	Washington Glory	11

August 23, 2008
W1	Chicago Bandits	5
W2	Philadelphia Force	1
Lower final
W3	Washington Glory	3
L4	Philadelphia Force	2

August 24, 2008
W4	Chicago Bandits
W5	Washington Glory

2008 NPF Championship Series - Game 1 #1 seed vs. #4 seed
Game	Date	Score	Location
1	August 22	Chicago Bandits 4, New England Riptide 1	Kimberly, Wisconsin
Chicago Bandits advance; Riptide to losers bracket

2008 NPF Championship Series - Game 2 #2 seed vs. #3 seed
Game	Date	Score	Location
2	August 22	Philadelphia Force 7, Washington Glory 4	Kimberly, Wisconsin
Philadelphia Force advance; Glory to losers bracket

2008 NPF Championship Series - Game 3 Game 1 loser vs. Game 2 loser
Game	Date	Score	Location
3	August 23	Washington Glory 11, New England Riptide 2	Kimberly, Wisconsin
Glory eliminate Riptide

2008 NPF Championship Series - Game 4 Game 1 winner vs. Game 2 winner
Game	Date	Score	Location
4	August 23	Chicago Bandits 5, Philadelphia Force 1	Kimberly, Wisconsin
Bandits to final; Force to losers bracket

2008 NPF Championship Series - Game 5 Game 3 winner vs. Game 4 loser
Game	Date	Score	Location
5	August 23	Washington Glory 3, Philadelphia Force 2	Kimberly, Wisconsin
Glory to final; Force eliminated

2008 NPF Championship Series - Game 6 Game 4 winner vs. Game 5 winner
Game	Date	Score	Location
6	August 24	Chicago Bandits 6, Washington Glory4	Kimberly, Wisconsin
Chicago Bandits win NPF Championship

2008 NPF Championship Series MVP
Player	Club	Stats.
Nicole Trimboli	Chicago Bandits	.555 (5/9) 5RBIs 2HRs SB

== Annual awards ==
Majestic Cup
(Best regular season record)
Chicago Bandits

Award	Player	Team
Player of the Year Award	Stacy May	Chicago Bandits
Pitcher of the Year	Katie Burkhart	Philadelphia Force
Rookie of the Year	Rachel Folden	Chicago Bandits
Defensive Player of the Year	Kristen Butler	Akron Racers
Offensive Player of the Year	Jaime Clark	Chicago Bandits
Coaching Staff of the Year	Chicago Bandits—Head Coach Mickey Dean, assistant coaches Thomas Macera and Craig Nicholson	

2008 All-NPF Team
Position	Name	Team
Pitcher	Katie Burkhart	Philadelphia Force
Pitcher	Eileen Canney	New England Riptide
Pitcher	Sarah Pauly	Washington Glory
Pitcher	Angela Tincher	Akron Racers
Catcher	Kristen Butler	Akron Racers
1st Base	Lyndsey Angus	New England Riptide
2nd Base	Emily Friedman	Philadelphia Force
3rd Base	Stacy May	Chicago Bandits
Shortstop	Chelsea Spencer	Philadelphia Force
Outfield	Jaime Clark	Chicago Bandits
Outfield	Sharonda McDonald	Philadelphia Force
Outfield	Kellie Wilkerson	Philadelphia Force
At-Large	Gina Carbonatto	New England Riptide
At-Large	Rachel Folden	Chicago Bandits
At-Large	Lindsay Gardner	Rockford Thunder
At-Large	Oli Keohohou	Washington Glory
At-Large	Sara Larquier	Washington Glory
At-Large	Lisa Modglin	New England Riptide

== See also ==
- List of professional sports leagues
- List of professional sports teams in the United States and Canada
