= 2007 National Pro Fastpitch season =

2007 NPF Season
- League: National Pro Fastpitch
- Sport: softball
- Duration: May 29, 2007 – August 18, 2007
- Number of teams: 6

2007 NPF Draft
- Top draft pick: Lindsay Schutzler; Tennessee
- Picked by: Chicago Bandits

Regular Season
- Majestic Cup (Best record): Washington Glory

Cowles Cup
- Champions: Washington Glory
- Runners-up: Rockford Thunder
- Finals MVP: Monica Abbott; Washington Glory

NPF seasons
- ← 2006 2008 →

The 2007 National Pro Fastpitch season was the fourth season of professional softball under the name National Pro Fastpitch (NPF) for the only professional women's fastpitch softball league in the United States. From 1997 to 2002, NPF operated under the names Women's Pro Fastpitch (WPF) and Women's Pro Softball League (WPSL). Each year, the playoff teams battle for the Cowles Cup.

== Teams, cities and stadiums ==
Team	City	Stadium
Akron Racers	Akron, Ohio	Firestone Stadium
Chicago Bandits	Lisle, Illinois	Benedictine University Sports Complex
New England Riptide	Lowell, Massachusetts	Martin Softball Field
Philadelphia Force	Allentown, Pennsylvania	ECTB Stadium
Rockford Thunder	Rockford, Illinois	SportsCore One
Washington Glory	Fairfax, Virginia	Softball Complex at George Mason University

National Pro Fastpitch teams

== Milestones and events ==
A number of changes to the NPF roster of teams happened in the offseason:

The Texas Thunder were sold to new ownership based in Rockford, Illinois. They relocated there for the 2007 season and renamed themselves the Rockford Thunder.

In January 2007, the Connecticut Brakettes announced they would no longer participate in NPF.

In February, an expansion team named the Washington Glory was added to NPF, and the Glory inherited the contracts of players from the Brakettes.

Arizona Heat suspended play for the 2007 season. Despite rumors to the contrary, the Heat never rejoined NPF.

NPF hired Cheri Kempf to be commissioner. Kempf's background includes pitching on the 1992 gold medal-winning United States national team in the World Cup in Beijing, China, producing instructional books and videos on softball, and announcing professional and college softball telecasts.

In March, the Akron Racers hired Shonda Stanton, the head softball coach at Marshall University to be field manager.

== Player acquisition ==
=== College draft ===
The 2007 NPF Senior Draft was held February 14, 2007. Lindsay Schutzler of Tennessee was selected first by the Chicago Bandits.

=== Notable transactions ===
Cat Osterman was drafted first in the 2006 NPF Draft by the Connecticut Brakettes. She did not sign with them, becoming a free agent on September 30, 2006. In December 2006, she signed a deal to join the Rockford Thunder.

== League standings ==
Team	GP	W	L	Pct.	GB
Washington Glory	44	34	10	.773	-
Akron Racers	43	26	17	.605	7.5
New England Riptide	44	26	18	.591	8
Rockford Thunder	44	24	20	.545	10
Philadelphia Force	44	24	20	.545	10
Chicago Bandits	44	23	21	.523	11

The Michigan Ice played a partial schedule in 2007, with hopes of receiving investor support in 2008 to become a full-time NPF member. The Ice never became a full-time member. League games against Team China, Denso Japan professional softball team, the Venezuela national team and the Stratford Brakettes were also scheduled. The results counted in the NPF's team records.

== NPF Championship ==

The 2007 NPF Championship Series was held at Sunset Point Park in Kimberly, Wisconsin August 24-6. The top four teams qualified and were seeded based on the final standings. The series matched the teams up in a double-elimination bracket.

August 25, 2007
1	Washington Glory	4
4	Rockford Thunder	0
2	Akron Racers	0
3	New England Riptide	3
Lower round 1
L1	Akron Racers	3
L2	Rockford Thunder	6

August 25, 2007
W1	New England Riptide	1
W2	Washington Glory	2
Lower final
W3	Rockford Thunder	5
L4	New England Riptide	0

August 26, 2007
W4	Washington Glory
W5	Rockford Thunder

2007 NPF Championship Series - Game 1 #2 seed vs. #3 seed
Game	Date	Score	Location
1	August 25	Akron Racers 0, New England Riptide 3	Kimberly, Wisconsin
Riptide advance; Racers to losers bracket

2007 NPF Championship Series - Game 2 #1 seed vs. #4 seed
Game	Date	Score	Location
2	August 25	Washington Glory 4, Rockford Thunder 0	Kimberly, Wisconsin
Glory advance; Thunder to losers bracket

2007 NPF Championship Series - Game 3 Game 1 loser vs. Game 2 loser
Game	Date	Score	Location
3	August 25	Akron Racers 3, Rockford Thunder 6 (10 innings)	Kimberly, Wisconsin
Rockford Thunder eliminate Akron Racers

2007 NPF Championship Series - Game 4 Game 1 winner vs. Game 2 winner
Game	Date	Score	Location
4	August 25	Washington Glory 2, New England Riptide 1	Kimberly, Wisconsin
Glory to final; Riptide to losers bracket

2007 NPF Championship Series - Game 5 Game 3 winner vs. Game 4 loser
Game	Date	Score	Location
5	August 26	Rockford Thunder 5, New England Riptide 0	Kimberly, Wisconsin
Thunder to final; Riptide eliminated

2007 NPF Championship Series - Game 6 Game 4 winner vs. Game 5 winner
Game	Date	Score	Location
6	August 24	Washington Glory 3, Rockford Thunder 1	Kimberly, Wisconsin
Washington Glory win NPF Championship

2007 NPF Championship Series MVP
Player	Club	Stats.
Monica Abbott	Washington Glory	2-0 0.00 ERA NH SV

== Annual awards ==
Majestic Cup
(Best regular season record)
Washington Glory

Award	Player	Team
Player of the Year Award	Amber Jackson	Washington Glory
Pitcher of the Year	Desiree Serrano	Washington Glory
Rookie of the Year	Kristina Thorson	Philadelphia Force
Defensive Player of the Year	Jackie Pasquerella	New England Riptide
Offensive Player of the Year	Veronica Wootson	Akron Racers
Manager of the Year	Carie Dever-Boaz	Washington Glory

2007 All-NPF Team
Position	Name	Team
Pitcher	Kristina Thorson	Philadelphia Force
Pitcher	Desiree Serrano	Washington Glory
Pitcher	Sarah Pauly	Washington Glory
Pitcher	Eileen Canney	New England Riptide
Catcher	Mackenzie Vandergeest	Rockford Thunder
1st Base	Kellie Wilkerson	Philadelphia Force
2nd Base	Veronica Wootson	Akron Racers
3rd Base	Norrelle Dickson	Akron Racers
Shortstop	Amber Jackson	Washington Glory
Outfield	Kristen Zaleski	Rockford Thunder
Outfield	Sharonda McDonald	Philadelphia Force
Outfield	Shanel Scott	New England Riptide
At-Large	Oli Keohohou	Washington Glory
At-Large	Nicole Thompson	Washington Glory
At-Large	Chelsea Spencer	Philadelphia Force
At-Large	Jamie Clark	Chicago Bandits
At-Large	Kristen Butler	Akron Racers
At-Large	Serena Settlemier	Rockford Thunder

== See also ==
- List of professional sports leagues
- List of professional sports teams in the United States and Canada
