= 2006 National Pro Fastpitch season =

2006 NPF Season
- League: National Pro Fastpitch
- Sport: softball
- Duration: May 31, 2006 - August 22, 2006
- Teams: 7

2006 NPF Draft
- Top draft pick: Cat Osterman; Texas
- Picked by: Connecticut Brakettes

Regular Season
- Majestic Cup (Best record): Chicago Bandits

Cowles Cup
- Champions: New England Riptide
- Runners-up: Connecticut Brakettes
- Finals MVP: Jocelyn Forest; New England Riptide

NPF seasons
- 2005 2007

The 2006 National Pro Fastpitch season was the third season of professional softball under the name National Pro Fastpitch (NPF) for the only professional women's fastpitch softball league in the United States. From 1997 to 2002, NPF operated under the names Women's Pro Fastpitch (WPF) and Women's Pro Softball League (WPSL). Each year, the playoff teams battle for the Cowles Cup.

== Teams, cities and stadiums ==
Team	City	Stadium
Akron Racers	Akron, Ohio	Firestone Stadium
Arizona Heat	Tucson, Arizona	Hi Corbett Field
Chicago Bandits	Lisle, Illinois	Benedictine University Sports Complex
Connecticut Brakettes	Stratford, Connecticut	Frank DeLuca Hall of Fame Field
New England Riptide	Lowell, Massachusetts	Martin Softball Field
Philadelphia Force	Allentown, Pennsylvania	ECTB Stadium
Texas Thunder	League City, Texas	Big League Dreams

National Pro Fastpitch teams

== Milestones and events ==
2004 NPF champion New York Juggernaut and the California Sunbirds (who played a partial schedule in 2005) were not on the 2006 schedule and ceased operations.

In September 2005, NPF announced the addition of the expansion team Philadelphia Force, owned by brothers William M. and John M. Thompson. The Force named Patriots Park in Allentown, Pennsylvania, as their home stadium. One of their first signings included 2004 Olympic Gold Medalist Natasha Watley. The Force did play at ECTB Stadium at Bicentennial Park in Allentown.

NPF announced that Patrick J. Linden had become their new president. An attorney, Linden has experience as counsel for the NPF owner's group.

== Player acquisition ==
=== College draft ===
The 2006 NPF Senior Draft was held 138, 2006 via conference call. Cat Osterman of Texas was selected first by the Connecticut Brakettes. Osterman opted not to sign with the Brakettes, becoming a free agent at the end of the 2006 season.

=== Notable transactions ===
Sarah Pauly signed her initial NPF contract, as the first player signed by the Connecticut Brakettes. In 2005 as a member of the amateur Stratford Brakettes, Pauly pitched against NPF teams.

== League standings ==
Team	GP	W	L	Pct.	GB
Chicago Bandits	42	30	12	.714	-
Connecticut Brakettes	42	27	15	.643	3
Akron Racers	46	29	17	.630	3
New England Riptide	41	24	17	.585	5.5
Texas Thunder	48	21	27	.438	12
Arizona Heat	48	20	28	.417	13
Philadelphia Force	42	14	28	.333	16

NPF's 2006 schedule was 48 games for each team, including seven four-game home series and five four-game road series. On the schedule were games against national teams from Canada, China and Chinese Taipei, as well as Denso Japan, a professional team. The USA Softball Team, World University Games Team and the Michigan Ice, a hopeful for NPF membership, were also scheduled as opponents. The results counted in the NPF's team records.

== NPF Championship ==

The 2006 NPF Championship Series was held at Frank DeLuca Hall of Fame Field in Stratford, Connecticut August 26 and 28. The top four teams qualified and were seeded based on the final standings. The series matched the teams up in a single-elimination bracket. The championship game was scheduled for August 27, but rain forced it to be moved to August 28.

NPF Semifinals (Aug. 26)
Chicago Bandits	0
New England Riptide	1
Connecticut Brakettes	1
Akron Racers	0

NPF Championship (Aug 28)
New England Riptide	2
Connecticut Brakettes	0

2006 NPF Championship Series - Game 1
Game	Date	Score	Location
1	August 26	Chicago Bandits 0, New England Riptide 1 (9 innings)	Stratford, Connecticut

2006 NPF Championship Series - Game 2
Game	Date	Score	Location
2	August 26	Connecticut Brakettes 1, Akron Racers 0 (8 innings)	Stratford, Connecticut

2006 NPF Championship Series - Game 3
Game	Date	Score	Location
3	August 28	New England Riptide 2, Connecticut Brakettes 0	Stratford, Connecticut
New England Riptide win NPF Championship

=== Championship Game ===
Team	Top Batter	Stats.
New England Riptide	Lyndsey Angus	2-3 RBI K
Stratford Brakettes	Kellie Wilkerson	1-2 BB K

Team	Pitcher	IP	H	R	ER	BB	SO	AB	BF
New England Riptide	Jocelyn Forest (W)	7.0	5	0	0	2	7	26	28
Stratford Brakettes	Sarah Pauly (L)	7.0	7	2	1	0	8	28	29

2006 NPF Championship Series MVP
Player	Club	Stats.
Jocelyn Forest	New England Riptide	2-0 14Ks 0.00 ERA 2SHs 0.62 WHIP (7Hs+3BBs/16.0 IP)

== Annual awards ==
Majestic Cup
(Best regular season record)
Chicago Bandits

Award	Player	Team
Player of the Year Award	Lyndsey Angus	New England Riptide
Pitcher of the Year	Sarah Pauly	Connecticut Brakettes
Rookie of the Year	Stacy May	Chicago Bandits
Defensive Player of the Year	Carri Leto	Philadelphia Force
Offensive Player of the Year	Jessica Merchant	Connecticut Brakettes
Managers of the Year	Chicago Bandits -- Eugene Lenti and Mickey Dean	

2006 All-NPF Team
Position	Name	Team
Pitcher	Sarah Pauly	Connecticut Brakettes
Pitcher	Jocelyn Forest	New England Riptide
Pitcher	Christa Williams	Texas Thunder
Pitcher	Amy Harre	Chicago Bandits
Catcher	Selena Collins	Chicago Bandits
1st Base	Jenna Hall	Philadelphia Force
2nd Base	Carri Leto	Philadelphia Force
3rd Base	Stacy May	Chicago Bandits
Shortstop	Jessica Merchant	Connecticut Brakettes
Utility	Lyndsey Angus	New England Riptide
Outfield	Iyhia McMichael	Akron Racers
Outfield	Kelly Kretschman	Connecticut Brakettes
Outfield	Anne Steffan	Chicago Bandits
At-Large	Kristen Zaleski	Texas Thunder
At-Large	Jackie Pasquerella	New England Riptide
At-Large	Nichole Thompson	Arizona Heat
At-Large	Oli Keohohou	Akron Racers
At-Large	Radara McHugh	Akron Racers
At-Large	Jaime Clark	Chicago Bandits

== See also ==
- List of professional sports leagues
- List of professional sports teams in the United States and Canada
