= 2004 National Pro Fastpitch season =

2004 NPF Season
- League: National Pro Fastpitch
- Sport: softball
- Duration: June 1, 2004 - August 18, 2004
- Teams: 6

2004 NPF Draft
- Top draft pick: Iyhia McMichael; Mississippi State
- Picked by: Akron Racers

Regular Season
- Regular Season Champions: Texas Thunder

Cowles Cup
- Champions: NY/NJ Juggernaut
- Runners-up: New England Riptide
- Finals MVP: Amanda Scott; NY/NJ Juggernaut

NPF seasons
- 2003 2005

The 2004 National Pro Fastpitch season was the first season of professional softball under the name National Pro Fastpitch (NPF) for the only professional women's fastpitch softball league in the United States. From 1997 to 2002, NPF operated under the names Women's Pro Fastpitch (WPF) and Women's Pro Softball League (WPSL). Each year, the playoff teams battle for the Cowles Cup.

== Teams, cities and stadiums ==
Team	City	Stadium
Akron Racers	Akron, Ohio	Firestone Stadium
Arizona Heat	Tucson, Arizona	Hi Corbett Field
California Sunbirds	Sacramento, California	United Sports Complexes
New England Riptide	Lowell, Massachusetts	Martin Softball Field
NY/NJ Juggernaut	Upper Montclair, New Jersey	Montclair State University Softball Field
Texas Thunder	Houston, Texas	University of Houston Cougars Softball Stadium

National Pro Fastpitch teams

== Milestones and events ==
The 2004 season was the culmination of years of work to relaunch the Women's Pro Softball League (WPSL) as a new league. In November 2002 the new name for WPSL - National Pro Fastpitch - was announced, along with a 2003 tour and league play beginning in 2004.

NPF initially announced a league roster of teams in Akron, Ohio (Akron Racers), Denver, Colo.(Colorado Altitude), Houston and San Antonio, Texas (Texas Thunder and San Antonio Armadillos), Sacramento, Calif. (California Sunbirds), Tucson, Ariz. (Arizona Heat), Lowell, Mass. (New England Riptide), and Parsippany, NJ (NY/NJ Juggernaut). The Racers were the only NPF team that also played in the WPSL. NPF conducted its first player drafts with these eight teams.

In March 2004, NPF released its inaugural schedule for 2004 and did not include the Armadillos and the Altitude. Reports allowed for the possibility of both teams joining the league in 2005 or later, but it never came to be.

NPF officially launched its first season on June 1, 2004, with three games: the Akron Racers at the Texas Thunder, the Arizona Heat visiting the California Sunbirds, and the New England Riptide at the New York/New Jersey Juggernaut.

== Player acquisition ==
=== College draft ===
NPF held tryouts and its first drafts at the 2003 National Fastpitch Coaches Association (NFCA) Convention, at the Del Lago Resort, in Montgomery, Texas December 3–6, 2003.

On December 6 at the 2004 NPF Draft, the eight NPF teams selected players in a four-round Elite Draft and a six-round College Senior Draft. San Antonio selected Michigan State first baseman, and Indiana assistant coach Stacey Phillips with the first overall selection in the Elite Draft. In the College Senior Draft Iyhia McMichael of Mississippi State was selected first by the Akron Racers.

After the decision was made to launch the 2004 season without the Colorado Altitude and San Antonio Armadillos, a Supplemental Draft was held to allocate players whose rights were held by Colorado and San Antonio.

=== Notable transactions ===
The Juggernaut signed Michele Smith, a two-time Olympic gold medal pitcher (1996 and 2000), and five-time Japan Pro League MVP. The Racers brought on board Danielle Henderson, a member of the 2000 gold medal Olympic team.

== League standings ==
Team	GP	W	L	Pct.	GB
Texas Thunder	58	41	17	.707	-
Akron Racers	60	39	21	.650	3
NY/NJ Juggernaut	60	39	21	.650	3
New England Riptide	60	25	35	.417	17
Arizona Heat	60	19	41	.317	23
California Sunbirds	58	15	43	.259	26

== NPF Championship ==

The 2004 NPF Championship Series was held at Firestone Stadium in Akron, Ohio August 25–9. The top four teams qualified and were seeded based on the final standings. The Racers won the tiebreaker over the Riptide based on winning the head-to-head season series 8–4. All series were planned to be best-of-three games, but that changed when rain cancelled the game 1 of the final on August 28. A single winner-take-all game was played on August 29.

NPF Semifinals (Best of 3)
1	Texas Thunder	1
4	New England Riptide	2
2	Akron Racers	1
3	NY/NJ Juggernaut	2

NPF Championship (Single game)
4	New England Riptide	1
3	NY/NJ Juggernaut	10

2004 NPF Semifinals NY/NJ Juggernaut defeat Akron Racers 2–1
Game	Date	Score	Series (NYNJ–AK)	Location
1	August 25	NY/NJ Juggernaut 2, Akron Racers 0	1–0	Akron, Ohio
2	August 26	NY/NJ Juggernaut 1, Akron Racers 3	1–1	Akron, Ohio
3	August 26	NY/NJ Juggernaut 2, Akron Racers 1	2–1	Akron, Ohio

2004 NPF Semifinals New England Riptide defeat Texas Thunder 2–1
Game	Date	Score	Series (TEX–NE)	Location
1	August 25	Texas Thunder 4, New England Riptide 1	1–0	Akron, Ohio
2	August 26	Texas Thunder 1, New England Riptide 3	1–1	Akron, Ohio
3	August 27	Texas Thunder 0, New England Riptide3	1-2	Akron, Ohio

2004 NPF Championship Game
Date	Score	Location
August 29	NY/NJ Juggernaut 10, New England Riptide 1	Akron, Ohio

=== Championship Game ===
Team	Top Batter	Stats.
NY/NJ Juggernaut	Kellie Wilkerson	2-3 4RBIs HR 2B BB
New England Riptide	Ashley Moore	1-4 RBI K

Team	Pitcher	IP	H	R	ER	BB	SO	AB	BF
NY/NJ Juggernaut	Amanda Scott (W)	5.0	4	1	1	3	4	20	23
NY/NJ Juggernaut	Gina Oaks	1.0	2	0	0	1	0	5	6
NY/NJ Juggernaut	Kaci Clark	1.0	0	0	0	0	1	3	3
New England Riptide	Leigh Ann Ellis (L)	0.2	2	3	3	2	1	4	6
New England Riptide	Jocelyn Forest	2.2	4	4	4	3	0	12	15
New England Riptide	Megan Matthews	3.2	5	3	2	1	2	16	17

2004 NPF Championship Series MVP
Player	Club	Stats.
Amanda Scott	NY/NJ Juggernaut	3-0 21Ks 0.73 ERA SH (19.0 IP)

== Annual awards ==
Regular season champions
Texas Thunder

Award	Player	Team
Player of the Year	Iyhia McMichael	Akron Racers
NPF Batting Champion	Iyhia McMichael	Akron Racers
Pitcher of the Year	Christa Williams	Texas Thunder
Defensive Player of the Year	Lindsay Gardner	Texas Thunder
Manager of the Year	Wayne Daigle	Texas Thunder

== NPF All-Star Teams ==

The 2004 NPF All-Star Series was held July 13 and 14 at Don E. Porter Hall of Fame Stadium in Oklahoma City, OK. The East All-Star team included players from NY/NJ Juggernaut, the New England Riptide, and the Akron Racers and was managed by the Racers' Judy Martino. The West All-Star team included players from California Sunbirds, the Arizona Heat, and the Texas Thunder and was managed by the Thunder's Wayne Daigle.

The USA Olympic softball team played a doubleheader against each NPF All-Star Team on July 13. The Olympians swept the games beating the East 5–0, and edging the West 5–3 in 9 innings. The West All-Stars beat the East by a score of 1–0 on July 14. Nancy Evans was named the Most Valuable Player.

2004 NPF ALL-STAR ROSTER - WEST TEAM
Player	NPF Team	Position
Wendy Allen (Note: Brandy Thurman replaced Wendy Allen on the All-Star roster when Allen was unable to attend the game)	Arizona Heat	1B
Erica Beach	Arizona Heat	P
Cheryl Bolding	Arizona Heat	OF
Clare Burnum	Texas Thunder	3B
Erin Evans	Texas Thunder	OF
Nancy Evans	Arizona Heat	3B
Jaime Foutch	California Sunbirds	3B
Lindsay Gardner	Texas Thunder	2B
Peaches James	Texas Thunder	P
Julie Marshall	California Sunbirds	C
Lisha Ribellia	Arizona Heat	IF
Ryan Realmuto	Texas Thunder	C
Brandy Thurman	California Sunbirds	IF
Christa Williams	Texas Thunder	P
Kristen Zaleski	Texas Thunder	OF

2004 NPF ALL-STAR ROSTER - EAST TEAM
Player	NPF Team	Position
Lindsey Collins-Miller	NY/NJ Juggernaut	C
Leigh Ann Ellis	New England Riptide	P
Jocelyn Forest	New England Riptide	P
Lyndsey Klein	NY/NJ Juggernaut	SS
Carri Leto	NY/NJ Juggernaut	2B
Iyhia McMichael	Akron Racers	OF
Gina Oaks	NY/NJ Juggernaut	OF
Jaclyn Pasquerella	NY/NJ Juggernaut	3B
Trena Peel	Akron Racers	OF
Jen Poore	Akron Racers	C
Amanda Scott	NY/NJ Juggernaut	P
Brandi Stuart	Akron Racers	2B
Kellie Wilkerson	NY/NJ Juggernaut	1B
Nicole Trimboli	Akron Racers	1B

== See also ==
- List of professional sports leagues
- List of professional sports teams in the United States and Canada
