= List of All-NPF Players =

The following is a list of National Pro Fastpitch players who have been selected for the All-NPF Team at least once in their careers. Each year's All-NPF Team recognizes players for excellence on the field during the season. Since 2006, the All-NPF Team has been selected by the league and announced during the awards banquet after the end of the regular season. In 2019, a player is named at each fielding position, four pitchers, a designated player, and five 'At-Large' selections. (Multiple players are selected if there is a tie in voting.)

From 2003–2005, NPF players were named to an All-Star teams and played All-Star games, in various formats.

The list below includes selections to those All-Star teams for 2003–2005. In 2008 "Team NPF" played exhibition games against the 2008 United States women's national softball team These "Team NPF" selections are NOT included below; 2008 includes only those named to the 2008 All-NPF Team.

As of the conclusion of 2019, Kelly Kretschman holds the record for most times named to the All-NPF Team (9). Monica Abbott holds the record for most consecutive times named All-NPF (8 times).

#	The number of times the player have been selected as All-NPF
^	Denotes player who was active in the NPF during the 2019 season

Player	#	Selections	Notes	Reference
Kelly Kretschman^	9	2006, 2009, 2010, 2012, 2013, 2015–2017, 2019		
Monica Abbott	8	2010–2017		
Sarah Pauly	7	2006–2008, 2010, 2013–2015		
Natasha Watley	7	2005, 2010–2015		
Megan Wiggins^	7	2011–2016, 2018		
Cat Osterman	6	2009, 2011–2015		
Kristen Butler	4	2007, 2008, 2013, 2014		
Jaime Clark	4	2005–2008		
Andrea Duran	4	2011, 2013–2015		
Rachel Folden	4	2008–2010, 2012		
Oli Keohohou	4	2006–2009		
Jaclyn Pasquerella	4	2004, 2006, 2009, 2010		
Shelby Pendley^	4	2015–2018		
Chelsea Spencer	4	2007–2010		
Kellie Wilkerson	4	2004, 2005, 2007, 2008		
Tammy Williams	4	2009, 2013–2015		
Kristen Zaleski	4	2004–2007		
Lyndsey Angus	3	2005, 2006, 2008		
Jill Barrett	3	2014–2016		
Eileen Canney	3	2007–2009		
Brittany Cervantes	3	2014, 2015, 2017		
Ashley Charters	3	2011–2013		
Vicky Galindo	3	2005, 2012, 2013		
Michelle Gascoigne	3	2012–2014		
Jolene Henderson^	3	2016, 2018, 2019		
Carri Leto	3	2004–2006		
Caitlin Lowe	3	2012–2014		
Stacy May	3	2006, 2008, 2010		
Sharonda McDonald	3	2007, 2008, 2012		
Iyhia McMichael	3	2004–2006		
Jessica Mendoza	3	2005, 2011, 2012		
Lisa Modglin	3	2008–2010		
Kelley Montalvo	3	2014–2016		
Amber Patton	3	2009, 2012, 2015		
Jordan Taylor	3	2015–2017		
Nicole Trimboli	3	2004, 2005, 2011		
Christa Williams	3	2004–2006		
Hallie Wilson	3	2016–2018		
Allexis Bennett^	2	2017, 2019		
Clare Burnum	2	2004, 2005		
Crystl Bustos	2	2005, 2009		
Emily Carosone^	2	2017, 2018		
Lindsey Collins	2	2003, 2004	Known as Lindsey Collins-Miller in 2004	
Selena Collins	2	2005, 2006		
GiOnna DiSalvatore	2	2012, 2013		
Taylor Edwards	2	2015, 2016		
Rachele Fico^	2	2014, 2019		
Jennie Finch	2	2005, 2010		
Samantha Findlay	2	2009, 2010		
Jocelyn Forest	2	2004, 2006		
Jaime Foutch	2	2003, 2004		
Emily Friedman	2	2008, 2010		
Taylor Gadbois	2	2016, 2017		
Lindsay Gardner	2	2004, 2008		
Chelsea Goodacre^	2	2017, 2019		
Lauren Haeger	2	2016, 2017		
Amber Jackson	2	2007, 2009		
Peaches James	2	2004, 2005		
Sam Marder	2	2011, 2012	Named All-NPF as Samantha Marder in 2011	
Bianca Mejia	2	2011, 2012		
Charlotte Morgan	2	2011, 2013		
Brenna Moss^	2	2018, 2019		
Nerissa Myers	2	2014, 2016		
Lisa Norris	2	2009, 2010		
Trena Peel	2	2004, 2005		
Ryan Realmuto	2	2004, 2005		
Keilani Ricketts^	2	2017, 2018		
Sierra Romero	2	2017, 2018		
Kristyn Sandberg^	2	2015, 2018		
Taylor Schlopy	2	2015, 2016		
Anne Steffan	2	2005, 2006		
Nadia Taylor^	2	2017, 2018		
Nichole Thompson	2	2006, 2007		
Kristina Thorson	2	2007, 2011		
Angela Tincher	2	2008, 2009		
Andi Williamson	2	2012, 2013		
Danielle Zymkowitz	2	2011, 2016		
Emily Allard	1	2014		
Wendy Allen	1	2004	Missed 2004 game	
Taran Alvelo^	1	2019		
Sarah Anderson	1	2005		
Allison Andrade	1	2003		
AJ Andrews	1	2017		
Lauren Bauer	1	2003		
Lauren Bay	1	2005		
Erica Beach	1	2004		
Bianka Bell^	1	2018		
Tarrah Beyster	1	2003		
Cheryl Bolding	1	2004		
Shauna Briggs	1	2003		
Kara Brun	1	2003		
Katie Burkhart	1	2008		
Jessica Burroughs^	1	2018		
Tonya Callahan	1	2010		
Gina Carbonatto	1	2008		
Kaylyn Castillo	1	2013		
Lauren Chamberlain	1	2018		
Abbey Cheek^	1	2019		
Amanda Chidester^	1	2019		
Lindsay Chouinard	1	2005		
Ashley Courtney	1	2005		
Danielle Cox	1	2003		
Jodie Cox	1	2005		
Norrelle Dickson	1	2007		
Shannon Doepking	1	2011		
Victoria Draper^	1	2018		
Leigh Ann Ellis	1	2004		
Dallas Escobedo	1	2017		
Erin Evans	1	2004		
Nancy Evans	1	2004		
Sami Fagan	1	2016		
Hannah Flippen^	1	2019		
Tairia Mims-Flowers	1	2005		
Amanda Freed	1	2005		
Olivia Galati	1	2013		
Megan Gibson	1	2010		
Jennifer Gilbert^	1	2019		
Alisa Goler	1	2016		
Sara Groenewegen^	1	2019		
Alyssa Haber	1	2011		
Jenna Hall	1	2006		
Erika Hanson	1	2003		
Amy Harre	1	2006		
Victoria Hayward^	1	2019		
Danielle Henderson	1	2005		
Natalie Hernandez	1	2017		
Lisa Iancin	1	2003		
Sahvanna Jaquish	1	2017		
Kristin Johnson	1	2005		
Griffin Joiner	1	2016		
Lovieanne Jung	1	2005		
Lyndsey Klein	1	2004		
Amy Kyler	1	2003		
Bailey Landry	1	2017		
Lauren Lappin	1	2014		
Sara Larquier	1	2008		
Danielle Lawrie	1	2011		
Julie Marshall	1	2004		
Sammy Marshall^	1	2018		
Scia Maumausolo	1	2003		
Brandee McArthur	1	2005		
Radara McHugh	1	2006		
Brittany McKinney	1	2011		
Jessica Merchant	1	2006		
Chelsea Mesa	1	2010		
Kim Nesloney	1	2005		
Kelsey Nunley	1	2016		
Stacey Nuveman	1	2005		
Gina Oaks	1	2004		
Aleshia Ocasio^	1	2019		
Nicole Pauly	1	2012		
Kimi Pohlman	1	2013		
Jen Poore	1	2004		
Kenora Posey	1	2009		
Jade Rhodes^	1	2018		
Abby Ramirez^	1	2019		
Jenna Rhodes	1	2009		
Sydney Romero^	1	2019		
Lisha Ribellia	1	2004		
Kaitlyn Richardson	1	2015		
Shellie Robinson	1	2017		
Amanda Scott	1	2004		
Shanel Scott	1	2007		
Jessie Scroggins^	1	2018		
Desiree Serrano	1	2007		
Serena Settlemier	1	2007		
Madison Shipman	1	2014		
Jamie Southern	1	2005		
Brandi Stuart	1	2004		
Gwen Svekis^	1	2019		
Venus Taylor	1	2003		
Ashley Thomas	1	2014		
Brandy Thurman	1	2004	Replaced Wendy Allen in 2004	
Jenny Topping	1	2005		
Shelby Turnier	1	2018		
Jessica Valis	1	2010		
Mackenzie Vandergeest	1	2007		
Jessie Warren^	1	2019		
Amanda Williams	1	2009		
Megan Willis	1	2010		
Veronica Wootson	1	2007		

== See also ==
- List of professional sports leagues
- List of professional sports teams in the United States and Canada
