= USA Softball Team Bound 4 Beijing Tour =

Bound 4 Beijing Tour
- Dates: 19 February 2008 - 26 July 2008
- Previous event: USA Softball Team Aiming for Athens Tour

The "Bound 4 Beijing Tour" was a tour for the US Softball Team in preparation for the 2008 Olympics. The Team went to face many College, Professional, International, and ASA teams.

== Schedule ==
Date	Location	Team	Result	Score
February 19, 2008	Tucson, AZ	Arizona Wildcats	W	16-0
February 21, 2008	Palm Springs, CA	Pacific Tigers	W	8-0 (6)
February 22, 2008	Palm Springs, CA	Palm Springs All-Stars	W	9-0
February 23, 2008	Palm Springs, CA	Florida Atlantic Owls	W	9-0
February 23, 2008	Palm Springs, CA	Fordham Rams	W	8-0
February 24, 2008	Palm Springs, CA	Hawaii Rainbow Wahine	W	15-0
February 29, 2008	Altomonte Springs, FL	UCF Knights	W	1-0
March 1, 2008	Altomonte Springs, FL	Maryland Terrapins	W	7-0
March 4, 2008	Hollywood, FL	FIU Golden Panthers	W	14-0
March 8, 2008	Clearwater, FL	USF Bulls	W	18-0
March 8, 2008	Clearwater, FL	NC State Wolfpack	W	13-0
March 19, 2008	Fullerton, CA	Cal St. Fullerton Titans	W	9-3
March 20, 2008	Fullerton, CA	ULL Ragin' Cajuns	W	1-0
March 21, 2008	Fullerton, CA	New Mexico Lobos	W	14-0
March 24, 2008	Oklahoma City, OK	Oklahoma St. Cowboys	W	7-0
March 25, 2008	Oklahoma City, OK	Oklahoma Sooners	W	2-0
March 26, 2008	Oklahoma City, OK	DePaul Blue Demons	W	23-0
March 26, 2008	Oklahoma City, OK	Virginia Tech Hokies	L	1-0 Note: Angela Tincher throws no-hitter
April 6, 2008	Las Cruces, NM	New Mexico St. Aggies	W	21-0
April 8, 2008	Houston, TX	Houston Cougars	W	10-3
April 10, 2008	Greensboro, NC	UNCG Spartans	W	13-0
April 12, 2008	Knoxville, TN	Tennessee Lady Volunteers	W	4-2
April 13, 2008	Johnson City, TN	Milligan College	W	24-0
April 15, 2008	Birmingham, AL	Alabama Crimson Tide	W	7-0
April 17, 2008	Ridgeland, MS	Mississippi St. Lady Bulldogs	W	13-0
April 19, 2008	Sulphur, LA	ULL Ragin' Cajuns	W	2-0
April 22, 2008	Los Angeles, CA	UCLA Bruins	W	8-2
May 1, 2008	Washington, PA	Robert Morris Colonials	W	16-0
May 3, 2008	Plant City, FL	Florida Southern Moccasins	W	12-0
May 6, 2008	Ann Arbor, MI	Michigan Wolverines	W	5-1
May 8, 2008	Williamsport, PA	ASA Longstreth All-Stars	W	15-0
May 10, 2008	Bowie, MD	Washington Glory	W	2-0
May 16, 2008	Visalia, CA	ASA Visalia All-Stars	W	13-1
May 18, 2008	Rohnert Park, CA	ASA Northern California Assault All-Stars	W	18-0
May 19, 2008	Sacramento, CA	ASA Team Sacramento All-Stars	W	22-0
May 22, 2008	Stockton, CA	ASA Northern California Heat All-Stars	W	10-0
May 23, 2008	Salinas, CA	ASA Salinas Storm All-Stars	W	10-0
May 25, 2008	Prescott, AZ	ASA Prescott All-Stars	W	15-0
June 5, 2008	Ft. Worth, TX	ASA Fort Worth Diamonds All-Stars	W	12-0
June 6, 2008	Oklahoma City, OK	NPF All-Stars	W	10-8
June 7, 2008	Oklahoma City, OK	Canada	W	9-5
June 8, 2008	Oklahoma City, OK	China	W	7-0 (5)
June 10, 2008	Topeka, KS	ASA Kansas All-Stars	W	17-0
June 12, 2008	St. Louis, MO	ASA St. Louis All-Stars	W	6-0
June 14, 2008	Normal, IL	NPF All-Stars	W	6-0
June 14, 2008	Normal, IL	Bloomington Lady Hearts	W	19-0 (4)
June 17, 2008	Stevens Pt., WI	ASA Mid-West All-Stars	W	20-1
June 19, 2008	South Bend, IN	College All-Stars	W	19-0
June 21, 2008	Midland, MI	ASA Midland Lady Explorers All-Stars	W	14-0
June 23, 2008	Ashland, OH	MAC All-Stars	W	20-0
June 25, 2008	Killeen, TX	ASA Texas All-Stars	W	13-0
June 27, 2008	Midland, TX	ASA Texas All-Stars	W	13-0
July 8, 2008	Portland, OR	ASA Portland All-Stars	W	19-0
July 10, 2008	Spokane, WA	ASA Spokane All-Stars	W	31-0 (9)
July 15, 2008	Rapid City, SD	ASA Rapid City Gold All-Stars	W	7-0
July 18, 2008	Springfield, MO	ASA All-Stars	W	15-0
July 20, 2008	Stratford, CN	ASA Brakettes All-Stars	W	9-0
July 22, 2008	Akron, OH	Akron Racers	W	6-2
July 24, 2008	Salem, VA	ASA Salem All-Stars	W	9-0
July 26, 2008	Irvine, CA	Team Intensity	W	6-2

== Roster ==
The roster of the 2008 USA national softball team is listed below.

No.	Name	Position	Hometown	College
14	Monica Abbott	Pitcher	Salinas, California	Tennessee
44	Laura Berg	Outfield	Santa Fe Springs, California	Fresno St.
6	Crystl Bustos	Infield	Canyon County, California	Palm Beach Community College
28	Andrea Duran	Infield	Selma, California	UCLA
27	Jennie Finch	Pitcher	La Mirada, California	Arizona
16	Lisa Fernandez	Pitcher/3B	Long Beach, California	UCLA
11	Tairia Flowers	Utility	Tucson, Arizona	UCLA
19	Vicky Galindo	Infield	Union City, California	California
34	Alicia Hollowell	Pitcher	Fairfield, California	Arizona
3	Lovieanne Jung	Infield	Fountain Valley, California	Arizona
12	Kelly Kretschman	Outfield	Indian Harbour Beach, Florida	Alabama
37	Lauren Lappin	Catcher	Anaheim, California	Stanford
26	Caitlin Lowe	Outfield	Tustin, California	Arizona
2	Jessica Mendoza	Outfield	Camarillo, California	Stanford
33	Stacey Nuveman	Catcher	La Verna, California	UCLA
8	Cat Osterman	Pitcher	Houston, Texas	Texas
31	Jenny Topping	Catcher	Whittier, California	Cal St. Fullerton
29	Natasha Watley	Infield	Irvine, California	UCLA

 [3]

Head Coach: Mike Candrea (Tucson, Ariz.. – Head Coach at the University of Arizona)
Full Time Assistant Coaches: Chuck D'Arcy, Karen Johns, John Ritterman
