= Lindsay James =

Lindsay James may refer to:

- Lindsay James (politician), member of the Iowa House of Representatives
- Lindsay James (softball), Greek softball player
- Lindsay James (Waterloo Road)
