= Kristie Fox =

American softball player

Current position
- Title: Head coach
- Team: UNLV
- Conference: Mountain West
- Record: 181–96 (.653)

Biographical details
- Born: September 16, 1985 (age 41); San Diego, California, U.S.

Playing career
- 2004–2007: Arizona
- Position: Infielder

Coaching career (HC unless noted)
- 2008: Arizona (GA)
- 2009: Murray State (assistant)
- 2010–2012: Texas Tech (assistant)
- 2013–2017: UT Arlington
- 2018–present: UNLV

Head coaching record
- Overall: 315–233 (.575)

Kristie Lynn Fox (born September 16, 1985) is an American former collegiate All-American softball shortstop, and current head coach for UNLV Rebels softball team. She attended Mt. Carmel High School and later played for the Arizona Wildcats softball team from 2004 to 2007. Fox led the Wildcats to back-to-back Women's College World Series championships in 2006 and 2007.

== Playing career ==
=== College career ===
Fox debuted on February 6, 2004 vs. the New Mexico Lobos in a 2/3 performance, including tallying a double. In her sophomore campaign, she earned First Team All-Pac-12 honors and was named a National Fastpitch Coaches Association First Team All-American. As a junior, she repeated conference and NFCA honors and helped lead the Wildcats into the World Series. For her senior year, she would maintain her conference recognition and led the team at the 2007 World Series by batting .500 for the series and in her second finale appearance, she had a hit and walked twice against 2007 National Player of The Year Monica Abbott for the Tennessee Lady Vols. She was named to the All-Tournament team and graduated from the university ranking top-10 in career RBIs, where she currently remains for the Wildcats.

=== Professional career ===
She was selected fifth overall in 2007 NPF Draft and played three seasons from 2007 to 2009, winning the first title for the Chicago Bandits team in 2008.

== Coaching career ==
Fox served as an assistant softball coach at the University of Arizona, Murray State University, and Texas Tech University, before serving as the head softball coach at the University of Texas at Arlington from 2013 to 2017. Fox was named head softball coach at the University of Nevada, Las Vegas on July 20, 2017.

== Statistics ==
Arizona Wildcats
| YEAR | G | AB | R | H | BA | RBI | HR | 3B | 2B | TB | SLG | BB | SO | SB | SBA |
| 2004 | 60 | 175 | 32 | 56 | .320 | 37 | 9 | 0 | 9 | 92 | .525% | 10 | 17 | 7 | 9 |
| 2005 | 57 | 180 | 39 | 64 | .355 | 64 | 9 | 0 | 13 | 104 | .578% | 27 | 15 | 8 | 8 |
| 2006 | 65 | 197 | 44 | 76 | .386 | 66 | 15 | 1 | 8 | 131 | .665% | 31 | 18 | 3 | 3 |
| 2007 | 65 | 193 | 48 | 66 | .342 | 63 | 15 | 1 | 16 | 129 | .668% | 34 | 23 | 5 | 5 |
| TOTALS | 247 | 745 | 163 | 262 | .351 | 230 | 48 | 2 | 46 | 456 | .612% | 102 | 73 | 23 | 25 |

== Head coaching record ==
Record table
| Season | Team | Overall | Conference | Standing | Postseason |
|---|---|---|---|---|---|
UT Arlington Mavericks (Western Athletic Conference) (2013)
| 2013 | UT Arlington | 25–28 | 8–13 | T-6th | |
UT Arlington Mavericks (Sun Belt Conference) (2014–2017)
| 2014 | UT Arlington | 21–33 | 4–16 | 8th | |
| 2015 | UT Arlington | 27–28 | 8–14 | 7th | |
| 2016 | UT Arlington | 29–20 | 8–16 | 7th | |
| 2017 | UT Arlington | 32–28 | 14–13 | 5th | NISC Regional |
| UT Arlington: | | 134–137 (.494) | 34–56 (.378) | | |
UNLV Rebels (Mountain West Conference) (2018–present)
| 2018 | UNLV | 33–20 | 13–11 | 4th | NISC Regional |
| 2019 | UNLV | 36–14 | 14–9 | 3rd | |
| 2020 | UNLV | 21–5 | | | Season cancelled due to COVID-19 pandemic |
| 2021 | UNLV | 25–15 | 14–7 | 2nd | |
| 2022 | UNLV | 43–15 | 17–7 | 3rd | NISC Runner-Up |
| 2023 | UNLV | 23–27 | 9–13 | T-7th | |
| UNLV: | | 181–96 (.653) | 67–47 (.588) | | |
| Total: | | 315–233 (.575) | | | |
National champion Postseason invitational champion Conference regular season champion Conference regular season and conference tournament champion Division regular season champion Division regular season and conference tournament champion Conference tournament champion
