= Christa Williams (softball) =

American softball player

Personal information
- Full name: Christa Lee Williams
- Born: February 8, 1978 (age 48) Houston, Texas, U.S.
Medal record
Women's softball
Representing the United States
Olympic Games
Gold medal – first place	1996 Atlanta	Team competition
Gold medal – first place	2000 Sydney	Team competition

Christa Lee Williams-Yates (born February 8, 1978) is an American, former collegiate three-time All-American, two-time Gold Medal winning Olympian, retired three-time pro All-Star, right-handed hitting softball pitcher originally from Houston, Texas. She competed at the 1996 Summer Olympics in Atlanta where she received a gold medal with the American team. Four years later at the 2000 Summer Olympics in Sydney, she won her second gold medal. Williams-Yates began her college career with the UCLA Bruins in 1997 before transferring to play softball with the Texas Longhorns (1998–99). Joining in its inaugural year, she played three years in the National Pro Fastpitch with the Texas Thunder (2004–06) and still ranks top-10 in career wins, strikeouts, ERA among other records. In 2018, Williams-Yates was named to the USA National Softball Hall of Fame. Currently, Williams-Yates teaches high school softball in Kingwood, Texas.

== College ==
In her freshman year, Williams-Yates was named a National Fastpitch Coaches Association Third Team All-American. She was also named First Team All-Pac-12 She led the Bruins to the Women's College World Series and into the championship final where they lost to the Arizona Wildcats on May 26. Williams-Yates was named to the All-Tournament Team going 4-2, throwing two shutouts with 46 strikeouts.

Williams-Yates transferred to University of Texas for the next two seasons. She was named a NFCA First Team in 1998 and the Second Team in 1999. She also would earn two First-Team All-Big 12 selections. This helped earn her a place on Team USA for the 2000 Summer Olympics and Williams-Yates opted not to return for her senior year.

== NPF ==
Williams-Yates was named an All-Star all three years of her career with the Texas Thunder. She debuted on June 1, 2004, throwing a two-hit shutout with 6 strikeouts over the Akron Racers. She no hit the Arizona Heat on June 18 with a 15 strikeout performance. On June 28, 2005, she set a personal best by fanning 17 of the Stratford Brakettes. Later that year beginning on July 7-August 6 she pitched a 10 consecutive game win streak, throwing 65.0 innings with 25 hits, 6 earned runs, 16 walks and 74 strikeouts for a 0.64 ERA and 0.63 WHIP.

Williams-Yates is the only NPF player to have played at least three seasons and be recognized as an All-Star every year of their career. She currently ranks top-10 in career statistics for wins, strikeouts, ERA, shutouts, strikeout ratio and WHIP.

== Statistics ==
=== UCLA Bruins & Texas Longhorns ===
YEAR	W	L	GP	GS	CG	SHO	SV	IP	H	R	ER	BB	SO	ERA	WHIP
1997	21	8	34	29	28	14	4	205.0	149	64	53	84	218	1.81	1.13
1998	28	6	43	33	27	16	5	230.1	81	24	15	67	364	0.45	0.64
1999	23	9	38	30	23	11	1	223.1	97	46	31	54	314	0.97	0.67
TOTALS	72	23	115	92	78	41	10	658.2	327	134	99	205	896	1.05	0.81

=== Team USA Olympic Games ===
YEAR	W	L	GP	GS	CG	SHO	SV	IP	H	R	ER	BB	SO	ERA	WHIP
1996	2	0	2	1	1	1	0	9.2	3	0	0	2	15	0.00	0.54
2000	2	0	5	1	0	0	2	16.0	5	0	0	3	23	0.00	0.50
TOTALS	4	0	7	2	1	1	2	25.2	8	0	0	5	38	0.00	0.51

=== National Pro Fastpitch Texas Thunder ===
YEAR	W	L	GP	GS	CG	SHO	SV	IP	H	R	ER	BB	SO	ERA	WHIP
2004	14	6	21	19	17	10	0	142.1	64	21	13	38	132	0.64	0.72
2005	17	5	24	23	18	7	1	157.1	85	24	17	37	172	0.75	0.77
2006	11	8	26	20	12	3	1	142.2	103	45	35	59	161	1.72	1.14
TOTALS	42	19	71	62	47	20	2	442.1	252	90	65	134	465	1.03	0.87
