= Kristen Butler =

American softball coach

Current position
- Title: Head coach
- Team: Rutgers
- Conference: Big Ten
- Record: 157–189 (.454)

Biographical details
- Born: Orlando, Florida, U.S.
- Education: Florida

Playing career
- 2003–2006: Florida
- Position: Catcher

Coaching career (HC unless noted)
- 2007–2008: Florida (asst.)
- 2011–2012: Mississippi Valley St. (asst.)
- 2007–2018: Charleston Southern (asst.)
- 2015–2018: Toledo
- 2019–present: Rutgers

Head coaching record
- Overall: 261–311 (.456)

Accomplishments and honors

Championships
- MAC West Division co-champions (2018)

Awards
- As player: 4× All-NPF team (2007, 2008, 2013, 2014); As head coach: MAC Coach of the Year (2018)

Kristen Butler (born May 13, 1984) is an American former professional softball catcher and current head coach for Rutgers. She played college softball for Florida in the Southeastern Conference from 2003 to 2006 and won the SEC Player of the Year award in 2006. She later went undrafted but played in the National Pro Fastpitch from 2006 to 2009, 12 for the Akron Racers and Chicago Bandits; currently Butler ranks top-10 in career RBIs and home runs for the league.

== Coaching career ==
=== Toledo ===
On July 8, 2014, Kristen Butler was announced as the new head coach of the Toledo softball program.

=== Rutgers ===
On June 8, 2018, Kristen Butler was announced as the new head coach of the Rutgers softball program.

== Statistics ==
=== Florida Gators ===
YEAR	G	AB	R	H	BA	RBI	HR	3B	2B	TB	SLG	BB	SO	SB	SBA
2003	64	142	11	25	.176	15	3	1	5	41	.288%	11	31	0	0
2004	57	159	16	47	.295	27	4	2	8	71	.446%	9	19	2	4
2005	64	174	24	56	.322	40	9	1	12	97	.557%	20	31	2	2
2006	68	189	33	54	.285	52	17	1	9	116	.613%	30	37	3	5
TOTALS	253	664	84	182	.274	134	33	5	34	325	.489%	70	118	7	11

== Head coaching record ==
=== College ===
Record table
Season	Team	Overall	Conference	Standing	Postseason
Toledo Rockets (Mid-American Conference) (2015–2018)
2015	Toledo	24–32	7–15	5th (West)	
2016	Toledo	21–33	12–11	3rd (West)	
2017	Toledo	24–34	11–13	5th (West)	
2018	Toledo	35–23	16–7	T-1st (West)	NISC Regional
Toledo:		104–122 (.460)	47–46 (.505)		
Rutgers Scarlet Knights (Big Ten Conference) (2019–present)
2019	Rutgers	29–26	11–12	6th	NISC Regional
2020	Rutgers	10–14			Season cancelled due to COVID-19 pandemic
2021	Rutgers	8–36	8–36	12th	
2022	Rutgers	25–30	3–17	13th	
2023	Rutgers	32–25	9–14	11th	
2024	Rutgers	33–22	14–9	3rd	
2025	Rutgers	20–36	3–19	T-16th	
Rutgers:		157–189 (.454)	48–107 (.310)		
Total:		261–311 (.456)			
National champion Postseason invitational champion Conference regular season champion Conference regular season and conference tournament champion Division regular season champion Division regular season and conference tournament champion Conference tournament champion
