= Rutgers Scarlet Knights softball =

- Founded: 1975 (51 years ago)
- University: Rutgers University–New Brunswick
- Head coach: Kristen Butler (8th season)
- Conference: Big Ten
- Location: Piscataway, New Jersey, US
- Home stadium: Rutgers Softball Complex
- Nickname: Scarlet Knights
- Colors: Scarlet

AIAW WCWS appearances
- 1979, 1981

NCAA Tournament appearances
- 1984, 1994

The Rutgers Scarlet Knights softball is the team that represents Rutgers University–New Brunswick in NCAA Division I college softball. The team participates in the Big Ten Conference. The Scarlet Knights who are currently led by head coach Kristen Butler. The team plays its home games at Rutgers Softball Complex which is located on the university's campus.

== History ==
=== Coaching history ===
Years	Coach	Record	%
1975–1979	No Coach	76–26–1	.743
1980–2006	Pat Willis	644–564–8	.533
2007–2018	Jay Nelson	279–354	.441
2019–present	Kristen Butler	72–106	.404

== Coaching staff ==
Name	Position coached	Consecutive season at Rutgers in current position
Kristen Butler	Head coach	4th
Rod Radcliffe	Assistant coach	1st
Brandon Duncan	Assistant coach	1st
Marcus Smith	Volunteer Assistant Coach	1st
Lauren Moroch	Director of Operations	4th
