= Frank DeLuca Hall of Fame Field =

Softball field in Stratford, Connecticut

Coordinates: 41.17491°N 73.12803°W

- Interactive map of Frank DeLuca Hall of Fame Field
- Location: 1000 Main Street, Stratford, Connecticut 06615
- Operator: Town of Stratford and the State of Connecticut
- Capacity: 1,800
- Surface: Grass

Construction
- Opened: 1966; renovation 2013

Tenant
- Connecticut Brakettes

The Frank DeLuca Hall of Fame Field is a state-of-the-art softball facility located in Stratford, Connecticut. It is the home of the Connecticut Brakettes team of Amateur Softball Association (ASA).
