= Amber Jackson =

American softball player

Amber Jackson (born June 27, 1984) is an American former collegiate All-American and retired professional softball player and former college softball head coach. She played for three years with the Bethune–Cookman Wildcats, from 2003 to 2005, before transferring to the Maryland Terrapins for the 2007 season. She is the season and career leader in numerous offense categories for both institutions, and is the Mid-Eastern Athletic Conference career leader in hits, triples and runs in three seasons.

She played professional softball in the National Pro Fastpitch from 2007 to 2009 with the defunct Washington Glory, winning a title and being named Player of The Year in 2007, and the USSSA Pride. Jackson led the Delaware State Hornets for five years from 2015 to 2019 before pursuing teaching abroad. She is one of the elite NCAA Division I hitters to amass a career .400 average, 200 RBIs with at least 50 home runs and an .800 slugging percentage; she is also one of the elite players to steal 100 bases, score 200 runs with 300 hits and a .400 average, the only NCAA player to belong to both clubs.

== Bethune–Cookman Wildcats & Maryland Terrapins ==
Jackson opened her career by being named First Team All-MEAC conference and "Rookie of The Year." In addition, she broke school and conference records for season RBIs and hits with career highs. As well, she also set new Wildcat records in home runs, triples, doubles, slugging percentage and average, the latter of which was another career best and led the NCAA in 2003.

As a sophomore, Jackson continued her success by being renamed First Team all-conference as well as "Player of The Year." She broke her own home run record and hit nearly .450 for the 2004 campaign. In 2005, Jackson once again captured identical conference honors from the previous year but also was named a National Fastpitch Coaches' Association Second Team All-American. She would become the first and is still the only softball player from the HBCUs to accomplish the honor. She posted a new home run total for the school as well as 77 runs to top the NCAA listing for the year.

Jackson would lead the Wildcats to a historic run in the NCAA softball tournament by also becoming the first, and so far only, HBCU team to advance to a Super Regional. Against the Texas Longhorns, Jackson managed to get a hit and walk but eventually was eliminated with her team on May 28. It would be Jackson's last season as she would follow Head Coach Laura Watten to the University of Maryland.

In her three seasons, she owned every school record for hitting and currently remains the best for average (.464), RBIs (175), home runs (34), triples (28), hits (284), slugging (.797%) and merely ranks second in doubles and walks. Excluding the average and walks, she too held every other MEAC record and still does for triples and hits, but stands top-5 for all other conference career statistics.

Playing in the ACC, Jackson was named 2007 First Team all-conference and repeated as an All-American. In one season she would set lasting school records in home runs, walks, runs and slugging percentage. Her 24 career best home run total (led the NCAA) was also a conference best, along with the slugging, both now rank top-5 all-time for an ACC season. Finally, her career best stolen bases also led the ACC and her average, RBIs and hits are top-10 Maryland Terrapins records.

On February 16, the Terrapin knocked in a career single game high 7 RBIs vs. the East Carolina Pirates. In a doubleheader on March 13, Jackson reached the 200 milestone for RBIs defeating the UMBC Retrievers. The next month on April 11 vs. the Georgetown Hoyas in another doubleheader, Jackson hit a walk-off home run against Jennifer Connelly in game one for the 50th in her career.

At the end of the season, Jackson uniquely would and does rank top-5 in home runs and stolen bases for a Terrapin career for just that one season. In an overall summation of her career at both schools, Jackson is a top-10 NCAA Division I career hitter in batting average (8th for a four-year career) and triples (tied 10th) all-time.

== NPF ==
Jackson was selected in the second round (14th overall) by the Washington Glory in the NPF draft on February 14, 2007. She would go on to be named All-NPF and "Player of The Year." That year she led the league in RBIs and home runs. She drove in 5 of those for a career best on June 15. Beginning on June 22-July 6 she posted a six game hit streak, hitting .555 (10/18) with 6 RBIs, 2 home runs, 2 walks and 3 stolen bases. For one of the games on July 1 vs. the Akron Racers, she achieved 3 hits for another personal high. Jackson would also make it into the Cowles Cup Championship vs. the Rockford Thunder and claimed the title behind a 3-1 win on August 26.

Jackson and the Glory would be able to defend their title in 2008 but eventually lost 6-4 on August 28. Jackson had a RBI triple in the loss. The next season, Jackson would join the new USSSA Pride after the Glory folded operations. With the Pride, she would earn a second All-NPF honor. It was Jackson's last season making her last appearance in the title game losing to the Rockford Thunder.

== Personal ==
Jackson is African-American. With a Masters of Education from The University of Maryland, Jackson found work as a high school teacher and softball coach. In 2011, she would return to her alma mater and join the coaching staff. In her first season, she helped lead the team to a regional appearance. In 2012, Jackson was inducted into the Bethune–Cookman Hall of Fame. Jackson was hired to coach the Delaware State Hornets in 2014. In 2017, Jackson was named to the MEAC Hall of Fame.

Jackson was named conference Coach of The Year in 2016, when they also won a share of the conference regular season. She would coach the 2015 MEAC Rookie of The Year Vanessa Washington as well as two-time first-team players Nicole Gazzola and Jasmine Melgoza.

== Statistics ==
=== Bethune–Cookman Wildcats & Maryland Terrapins ===
YEAR	G	AB	R	H	BA	RBI	HR	3B	2B	TB	SLG	BB	SO	SB	SBA
2003	66	202	63	99	.490	71	8	11	19	164	.812%	22	15	25	25
2004	69	198	64	89	.449	36	12	9	13	156	.788%	38	19	16	18
2005	68	212	77	96	.453	68	14	8	14	168	.792%	33	20	34	38
2007	58	157	61	64	.407	56	24	1	11	149	.949%	55	19	39	43
TOTALS	261	769	265	348	.452	231	58	29	57	637	.828%	148	73	114	124

=== NPF Washington Glory & USSSA Pride ===
YEAR	AB	R	H	BA	RBI	HR	3B	2B	TB	SLG	BB	SO	SB
2007	113	31	42	.371	38	15	1	3	92	.814%	26	26	14
2008	110	19	24	.218	16	5	0	4	43	.391%	24	27	4
2009	111	21	30	.270	16	6	0	2	50	.450%	17	28	5
TOTALS	334	71	96	.287	70	26	1	9	185	.554%	67	81	23

== Head coach statistics ==
Record table
Season	Team	Overall	Conference	Standing	Postseason
Delaware State Hornets (Mid-Eastern Athletic Conference) (2015–2019)
2015	Delaware State	21–23	14–4	1st	
2016	Delaware State	30–18	16–2	1st	
2017	Delaware State	19–29	13–5	4th	
2018	Delaware State	12–36	9–8	5th	
2019	Delaware State	10–32	7–8	6th	
Delaware State:		92–138 (.400)	59–27 (.686)		
Total:		92–138 (.400)			

== Links ==
- NCAA Division I softball career .400 batting average list
- NCAA Division I softball career 200 RBIs list
- NCAA Division I softball career 50 home runs list
