= Tiffany Stewart =

American clinical psychologist

- Born: 1974 (age 50–51)
- Education: PhD in Clinical Psychology
- Alma mater: Florida State University, Louisiana State University
- Scientific career
- Institutions: Pennington Biomedical Research Center
- Website: https://www.pbrc.edu/research-and-faculty/faculty/Stewart-Tiffany-PhD.aspx

Tiffany M. Stewart (born 1974) is an American clinical psychologist and the Dudley and Beverly Coates Endowed Professor at Pennington Biomedical Research Center of the Louisiana State University System.

== Biography ==
Stewart is a licensed clinical psychologist who provides mental health treatment and conducts behavioral health research as Director of the Behavior Technology Laboratory. She was the lead scientist who developed one of the first computerized procedures for measuring body image called the Body Morph Assessment (BMA). Stewart also established the first treatment clinic at Pennington Biomedical Research Center, the Diabetes Clinic, after working with the Louisiana State University Board of Regents to expand Pennington's mission beyond prevention research to include disease treatment. Stewart has been recognized for her work including the Louisiana Legislative Women's Caucus Women of Excellence Award for Health & Medicine, the 2020 Baton Rouge Influential Women in Business distinction, and Louisiana State University's Esprit de Femme award. She has also presented a TEDx talk entitled, "The Body Revolution We Need: Function Over Form".

== Education ==
Stewart completed her undergraduate studies in Psychology at Florida State University, earning her bachelor's of science degree in 1996. She then went on to complete her Master's in 1999 and her doctorate in 2002 both in Clinical Psychology at Louisiana State University
