= Kelly Kretschman =

American softball player

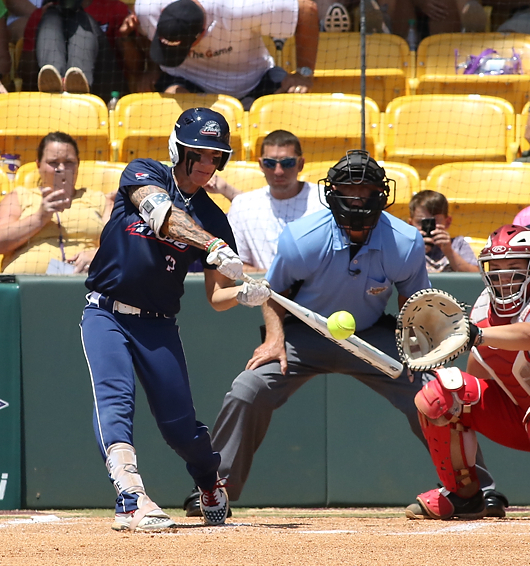
- Kretschman playing for the USSSA Pride in 2017

USSSA Pride – No. 12
- Right Field
- Born: August 26, 1979 (age 47); Indian Harbor Beach, Florida, U.S.
- Bats: Left Throws: Right

NPF debut
- 2005, for the Akron Racers

NPF statistics (through 2019)
- Batting average: .346
- Hits: 512
- Home runs: 55
- Runs batted in: 265

Teams
- Alabama Crimson Tide (1998–2001); Akron Racers (2005); Connecticut Brakettes (2006); Washington Glory (2007); USSSA Pride (2009–2019); Denso Bright Pegasus (2018–2019); Toda Medics (2020)

Career highlights and awards
- 9× All-NPF Team Selection; 7× Crowles Cup Champion (2005, 2007, 2010, 2013-2014, 2018-2019); 2× Offensive Player of the Year (2016-2017); 3× NPF Player of the Year (2015-2017); Triple Crown Winner (2017); Home Run Champion (2016)
Medals
Women's softball
Representing the United States
Olympic Games
Gold medal – first place	2004 Athens	Team competition
Silver medal – second place	2008 Beijing	Team competition

Kelly Sue Kretschman (born August 26, 1979) is an American former nine-time professional All-Star softball outfielder and current head coach for the Volts for the inaugural 2025 season of the Athletes Unlimited Softball League (AUSL). Previously, she has been the head coach for the USSSA Pride of the Women's Professional Fastpitch (WPF). Kretschman played college softball at Alabama where she is the career leader in doubles and total bases. As a member of the United States women's national softball team, she won a gold medal at the 2004 Summer Olympics and a silver medal at the 2008 Summer Olympics. She also played in the National Pro Fastpitch with four teams including her longest tenure with the USSSA Pride; where she is the all-time career leader in RBIs, hits, doubles and base on balls. She also owns numerous records for the Tide and is one of select NCAA Division I players to bat .400 with 300 hits, 200 runs and 100 stolen bases for her career.

== College career ==
After graduating from Satellite High School in Satellite Beach, Florida, Kretschman attended the University of Alabama. The freshman debuted with Alabama Crimson Tide softball on February 13 and she had hit in two plate appearances against the Fresno State Bulldogs. She was named to the National Fastpitch Coaches' Association All-American and All-SEC second teams. She broke both school and conference season records in batting average, home runs, hits (NCAA all-time Freshman Class record) and slugging percentage (which led the NCAA that year). Her RBIs, triples, runs and on-base percentage ranked top-10 at Alabama; she still claims all those top season records but has been surpassed in the average.

Starting February 27 and lasting until April 4, she went on the NCAA's third best hit streak (35 games, 26 consecutive). She hit .521 (62/119) on 15 home runs, 5 triples, 15 doubles to slug 1.109%, with 36 RBIs, 16 walks, 25 stolen bases and striking out just four times. For one of her games, Kretschman reached career single game highs in RBIs (5) and hits (4), as well as hitting a school record two triples to end the game on a run-rule victory over the Wisconsin Badgers on March 1. Later on March 25, Kretschman walked 4 times to set another career best vs. the Georgia Southern Eagles.

For the 1999 season, Kretschman repeated as All-American, moved up to First Team All-SEC and broke another school record with 30 stolen bases. Her hits and triples are top-10 for a season with the Tide. In a doubleheader with the Arkansas Razorbacks on March 21, she would swipe 4 bags for a career highlight.

Kretschman was named First Team All-American for the 2000 season and continued her all-conference success. She ranked top-10 in school history for virtually every season stat: average, RBIs, home runs, triples, doubles, hits, walks, runs, stolen bases, slugging and on-base percentages. The hits total (102) led the NCAA that year and is still the school record while every other latter category is a top-10 Tide record.

The Tide made it into their first Women's College World Series and Kretschman's only career appearance at the series, she hit .333 with 3 RBIs and slugging over .550% to be named to the All-Tournament Team. The Tide were eventually eliminated by the Southern Mississippi Golden Eagles despite nabbing a victory over DePaul.

For a final season, Kretschman would be named First Team All-American and All-SEC. She entered more top-10 season records for average, hits, walks and percentages to the Alabama Crimson Tide program. Besting the Michigan Wolverines 7-2 on February 28, Kretschman connected for her 50th career home run off pitcher Meghan Ritter.

Kretschman would graduate owning career records in average, RBIs, home runs, triples, doubles, hits, walks, runs, stolen bases, slugging and on-base percentages for the Tide. She retains the records for hits, home runs, doubles, triples, runs and slugging. She is tops in the SEC for doubles, total bases and ranks top-10 in several other categories. In NCAA Division I, Kretschman ranks in career runs (3rd), total bases (3rd) and hits (6th)

== Professional career ==
Kretschman began her career with the Akron Racers in 2005 and hit .280. She debuted on June 2 vs. the Arizona Heat and had a hit in the game. From the next years on 2006–2019, not including 2008, Kretschman would play for the Connecticut Brakettes, Washington Glory and finally the USSSA Pride, her longest tenure. On June 11, she would nab a career best 4 hits against the Chicago Bandits. Later on July 18, she was walked three times against the Akron Racers for another single game high. In 2006, 2009–10 and 2015–19, she was named an NPF All-Star. Beginning on August 20 during that year's playoffs, Kretschman would begin a career best 16 consecutive game hit streak, tallying a hit in all four games for the Pride. She would win her first Player of the Year award in 2015. She would start the season at 12 straight games with a hit to extend the streak to 16 games. For the streak, Kretschman hit .509 (27/53) with 14 RBIs, five home runs, four doubles, slugging .962% with four walks. For one of the games on June 8, she would steal two bases in facing the Dallas Charge for another career highlight. In 2016, she was again named Player of the Year and became the first batter to achieve the Triple Crown with career highs in average, RBIs and home runs; she also had career bests in runs, hits, slugging and stolen bases. In 2017, she earned a third consecutive Player of the Year honor with career highs that topped her own records for walks and batting average to set league records.

She also won the Cowles Cup Championships from 2005 and 2007. In 2010, she won her third title; in her other seasons of play since but not including 2011-12, Kretschman was a finalist for the title and claimed her fourth NPF Cowles Cup on August 24, 2013. She would also claim the 2014, 2018 and 2019 titles to give her a remarkable 7 titles. She made her last appearance in the 2019 championship game, going 2/4 with 2 RBIs and a stolen base. In all the combined finals games, Kretschman has gone 9/34 with five RBIs, a home run, double and two walks.

Kretschman holds the current career record for walks (the first to cross 200) and she became the only player with three 30 walk seasons. Kretschman also claims the hits (first past 500), doubles (the first player to top 80), RBI (being the first to reach 250), and runs crowns. In 2015, she also became just the second player to collect 300 career hits and in 2016 she became the first to tally 1,000 at bats. Currently, she stands second all-time in home runs behind Megan Wiggins. Kretschman is the most decorated player in league history with her three Player of the Year recognitions, nine All-Star selections and seven titles. In 2019, Kretschman announced her retirement.

== Team USA ==
Kretschman began her career with Team USA in 2000 while still a student at Alabama. On the "Aiming For Athens" tour, she would hit .471. She had tour highs of 5 RBIs (in part courtesy of a grand slam) vs. the UCLA Bruins on March 28 and a perfect 4/4 hit game over the Texas Longhorns on March 9, 2004.

At the Olympics, Kretschman at one point had a 5-game RBI streak. She went 1/3 vs. Australia in the August 23 finale to earn gold. Kretschman was tied leading the team in triples, doubles and was perfect in the field.

The "Bound 4 Beijing" tour saw Kretschman lead the team in walks while hitting .467 and slugging .822%. On March 28, Team USA suffered a 1-0 loss that snapped their perfect Olympic tours record at the hands of Angela Tincher and the Virginia Tech Hokies. Kretschman walked in the second inning to disrupt what was otherwise a perfect game.

In the August 21 Olympic softball finale vs. Japan, Kretschman was shut out by Yukiko Ueno managing only a walk as the US was downed 3-1 to take silver. In her last international tournament, Kretschman hit .348 for Team USA.

== Coaching career ==
In 2012, Kretschman was a volunteer assistant with the University of Maryland. From 2015 to 2016, Kretschman was an assistant coach at Texas State.

In July 2022, she was named the head coach of the USSSA Pride of the Women's Professional Fastpitch.

In November 2024, Athletes Unlimited hired Kretschman as the head coach for team Volts in their inaugural season of the Athletes Unlimited Softball League (AUSL).

== Statistics ==
Alabama Crimson Tide
YEAR	G	AB	R	H	BA	RBI	HR	3B	2B	TB	SLG	BB	SO	SB	SBA
1998	67	214	94	100	.467	64	25	7	22	211	.986%	31	11	40	47
1999	65	210	54	83	.395	31	8	4	16	131	.624%	34	13	30	33
2000	80	234	83	102	.436	58	14	3	18	168	.718%	51	16	43	46
2001	61	184	57	83	.451	38	13	2	9	135	.733%	45	14	20	28
TOTALS	273	842	288	368	.437	191	60	16	65	645	.766%	161	54	133	154

Team USA
YEAR	AB	R	H	BA	RBI	HR	3B	2B	TB	SLG	BB	SO	SB	SBA
2004	142	54	64	.450	40	7	3	14	105	.739%	17	18	5	6
2008	147	76	66	.449	58	11	1	13	114	.775%	51	17	5	5
TOTALS	289	130	130	.450	98	18	4	27	219	.758%	68	35	10	11

NPF
YEAR	AB	R	H	BA	RBI	HR	3B	2B	TB	SLG	BB	SO	SB
2005	75	14	21	.280	13	1	0	3	27	.360%	13	9	6
2006	100	26	41	.410	12	3	0	9	59	.590%	35	16	2
2007	51	16	17	.333	5	1	2	3	27	.529%	19	10	3
2009	120	17	42	.350	22	8	0	7	73	.608%	21	18	1
2010	140	27	41	.293	29	7	1	11	77	.550%	29	23	5
2011	70	14	21	.300	10	1	0	3	27	.385%	16	4	2
2012	82	17	29	.353	24	3	0	5	44	.536%	22	18	1
2013	129	26	41	.318	19	1	0	4	48	.340%	26	17	4
2014	124	12	36	.290	24	3	0	7	52	.419%	13	20	0
2015	150	24	49	.326	23	7	0	5	75	.500%	16	9	10
2016	144	45	65	.451	46	14	0	9	116	.805%	33	17	13
2017	131	35	64	.488	19	6	2	12	98	.748%	36	16	6
2018	69	17	18	.261	9	0	0	5	23	.333%	20	10	1
2019	93	9	27	.290	10	0	0	4	31	.333%	25	13	5
TOTALS	1478	299	512	.346	265	55	5	87	774	.523%	324	200	59

== Personal life ==
Kretschman is openly lesbian and her partner is Ally Carda.

== Links ==
- NCAA Division I softball career .400 batting average list
- NCAA Division I softball career 50 home runs list
