= Mid-Michigan Ice =

Professional softball team

Michigan Ice
- Logo

Information
- League: National Pro Fastpitch
- Location: Midland, Michigan
- Ballpark: Currie Stadium
- Folded: 2008

The Michigan Ice was a pro softball team in Michigan.

The team was located in Midland, and plays its home games at Currie Stadium, located in Emerson Park, Michigan.

After playing partial seasons in the NPF for 2006 and 2007 with hopes of becoming an expansion team, the team folded in 2008, citing financial difficulties.
