= Washington Glory =

Former American women's softball team

- [[File: |frameless|class=pageimage|alt=]] Logo

Information
- League: National Pro Fastpitch
- Location: Fairfax, Virginia
- Ballpark: George Mason Softball Complex
- Founded: 2007
- Folded: 2008
- Cowles Cup championships: 1 (2007)
- Regular season champion: 1 (2007)
- Colors: navy blue, red
- Ownership: Joseph Amato
- Manager: Carrie Dever-Boaz
- Coach: Carrie Dever-Boaz; Erin Goettlicher (Assistant)

The Washington Glory was a women's softball team based in Fairfax, Virginia. They played during 2007 and 2008 as a member of National Pro Fastpitch.

== History ==
The Glory won the 2007 NPF championship, defeating the Rockford Thunder in the final game of the championship series becoming the first team in league history to win the regular season and playoff titles in the same season. The playoffs started out on a high note for the Glory when Monica Abbott threw her first professional no hitter and the first no hitter in Glory history in the August 25 opener against Rockford.

The first batter in Glory history was Kelly Kretschman on May 31. The first home run in Glory history was by Brooke Marnitz on May 31.

The Glory played their 2008 season at the Westfield Softball Complex in Chantilly, Va. due to construction on their complex at George Mason University. During the 2008 season, the Glory's Desiree Serrano threw the first perfect game in team history, blanking the Venezuela national team.

The Glory were to return for the 2009 season; however financial difficulties by ownership led National Pro Fastpitch (NPF) to attempt to find a new owner, but the team carried too much debt and was folded. Glory player contracts were acquired by the replacement USSSA Pride franchise based in Florida.

== Hall of fame ==
Three Glory players were named to the All NPF Team in 2008. Those players were:

- 3B Sara Larquier
- 1B Oli Keohohou
- P Sarah Pauly

== USA Softball players ==
- Monica Abbott
- Kelly Kretschman
- Stacey Nelson

== Season-by-season ==
Season records
Season	W	L	T	Finish	Playoff results
2007	34	10	0	1st place National Pro Fastpitch	Won National Pro Fastpitch Championship Game over the Rockford Thunder
2008	30	18	0	2nd place National Pro Fastpitch	Lost National Pro Fastpitch Championship Game to the Chicago Bandits
Totals	64	28	0		

== Former players ==
- 3: Stephanie Best (Retired after 2008 season)
- 8: Christa Dalakis (Running a health club in Tysons Corner, Virginia)
- 27: Germaine Fairchild (Head Coach of the former National Pro Fastpitch team New England Riptide)

== Staff ==
- Dr. David R. Miller, M.D.: Hand and wrist consultant.
- Jarrod Wronski: Team P. A. announcer, broadcaster, emcee and DJ

Achievements
Preceded by Chicago Bandits; 2006	NPF Regular Season Champions; Washington Glory; 2007	Succeeded by Chicago Bandits; 2008
Preceded by New England Riptide; 2006	Cowles Cup NPF Champions; Washington Glory; 2007	Succeeded by Chicago Bandits; 2008
