= Lindsay James (softball) =

Greek softball player (born 1984)

Personal information
- Nationality: Greek
- Born: 6 February 1984 (age 41); Redwood City, California, United States

Sport
- Sport: Softball

Lindsay James (born 6 February 1984) is a Greek softball player. She competed in the women's tournament at the 2004 Summer Olympics.
