= Jaime Clarke =

American novelist and editor

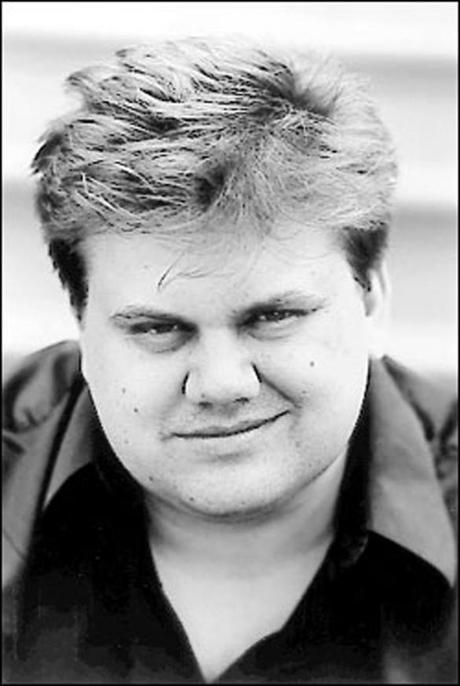
- Jaime Clarke in 2019
- Born: April 4th 1971; Kalispell, Montana, U.S.
- Education: Brophy College Preparatory; Arizona State University; University of Arizona; Bennington College (MFA)
- Occupations: Novelist, editor
- Writing career
- Literary movement: Postmodernism
- Website: www.jaimeclarke.com

Jaime Clarke is an American novelist and editor. He is a founding editor of the literary journal Post Road.

== Early life and education ==
Clarke was born in Kalispell, Montana, but grew up in Phoenix, Arizona where he graduated from Brophy College Preparatory. He attended Arizona State University as an English major, but flunked out while working as a runner for financier Charles Keating. He earned a Bachelor of Arts from the University of Arizona and an MFA in creative writing from Bennington College in 1997.

== Career ==
Clarke moved to New York City where he worked at the Harold Ober Associates literary agency. He quit his job after the release of his debut novel We're So Famous in 2001. Laura van den Berg on Clarke's work wrote, "Jaime Clarke has been one of our foremost chroniclers of obsession since his debut novel, We’re So Famous, appeared in 2001."

He subsequently wrote a trilogy of novels about the protagonist Charlie Martens: Vernon Downs, World Gone Water, and Garden Lakes (2016). He is also the author of the Golden Age detective novel, The Disappearance of Swenson’s Secretary: A Harold Ober Mystery under the pseudonym J.D. West as well as the memoir, Typical of the Times: Growing Up in the Culture of Spectacle, which is the basis for his microcast, Typical.

Clarke has taught creative writing at the University of Massachusetts in Boston and Emerson College.

== Personal life ==
Clarke is married to Mary Cotton with whom he owns a bookstore in Newton Centre, Massachusetts.

== Bibliography ==
=== Novels ===
- We're So Famous. Bloomsbury. 2001. ISBN 978-0747554226.
- Vernon Downs: A Novel. Roundabout Press. 2014. ISBN 978-0985881221.
- World Gone Water: A Novel. Roundabout Press. 2015. ISBN 978-0985881283.
- Garden Lakes. Bloomsbury. 2016. ISBN 978-1448215645.

=== As editor ===
- Clarke, Jaime, ed. (2007). Don't You Forget About Me: Contemporary Writers on the Films of John Hughes. Simon & Schuster. ISBN 978-1416934448.
- Clarke, Jaime; Cotton, Mary, eds. (2011). No Near Exit: Writers Select Their Favorite Work from Post Road Magazine. Dzanc Books. ISBN 978-0982631843.
- Lethem, Jonathan (2011). Clarke, Jaime (ed.). Conversations with Jonathan Lethem. University Press of Mississippi. ISBN 978-1604739725.
- Lehane, Dennis; Cotton, Mary; Clarke, Jaime, eds. (2012). Boston Noir 2: The Classics. Akashic Books. ISBN 978-1617751363.
- Clarke, Jaime, ed. (2013). Talk Show: On the Couch with Contemporary Writers. PFP Publishing. ISBN 978-0989237239.

=== Non-fiction ===
- F. Scott Fitzgerald's the Great Gatsby: Bookmarked. Ig Publishing, Incorporated. 2017. ISBN 978-1632460394.
- Typical of the Times: Growing Up in the Culture of Spectacle. Roundabout Press. 2022. ISBN 978-1948072083.
