= Sharonda McDonald-Kelley =

American softball coach

Current position
- Title: Head coach
- Team: Michigan State
- Conference: Big Ten
- Record: 51–91 (.359)

Biographical details
- Education: Texas A&M

Playing career
- 2004–2007: Texas A&M

Coaching career (HC unless noted)
- 2009: Texas Southern (asst.)
- 2010–2012: Ohio (asst.)
- 2013–2014: LSU (Volunteer asst.)
- 2015: Texas Tech (AHC)
- 2016–2017: Florida (asst.)
- 2018: Ohio State (asst.)
- 2019–2022: Campbell
- 2023–Present: Michigan State

Head coaching record
- Overall: 152–172 (.469)
- Tournaments: NCAA: 1–4 (.200)

Accomplishments and honors

Championships
- 2× Big South regular season (2021, 2022); 2× Big South Tournament (2021, 2022)

Awards
- Big South Coach of the Year (2021)

Sharonda McDonald-Kelley is an American former softball player and current head coach at Michigan State.

== Playing career ==
McDonald played college softball for Texas A&M from 2004 to 2007. She was named the Big 12 Conference Softball Freshman of the Year in 2004. As a sophomore in 2005, she was a perfect 48-for-48 in stolen bases and won the inaugural NFCA Golden Shoe Award.

== Coaching career ==
=== Campbell ===
On June 19, 2018, McDonald-Kelley was named the head coach of Campbell.

=== Michigan State ===
On June 10, 2022, Sharonda McDonald-Kelley was announced as the new head coach of the Michigan State softball program, replacing Jacquie Joseph who retired as head coach after 29 seasons.

== Head coaching record ==
=== College ===
Record table
Season	Team	Overall	Conference	Standing	Postseason
Campbell Lady Camels (Big South Conference) (2019–2022)
2019	Campbell	26–28	14–9	3rd	
2020	Campbell	10–15	0–1	9th	Season canceled due to COVID-19
2021	Campbell	28–19	15–3	1st	NCAA Regional
2022	Campbell	37–19	21–6	T-1st	NCAA Regional
Campbell:		101–81 (.555)	50–19 (.725)		
Michigan State Spartans (Big Ten Conference) (2023–Present)
2023	Michigan State	14–32	4-19	14th	
2024	Michigan State	21–30	7-16	13th	
2025	Michigan State	16–29	6-16	14th	
2026	Michigan State	17–34	3-20	T-16th	
Michigan State:		68–125 (.352)	20–71 (.220)		
Total:		152–172 (.469)			
National champion Postseason invitational champion Conference regular season champion Conference regular season and conference tournament champion Division regular season champion Division regular season and conference tournament champion Conference tournament champion
