= Philadelphia Force =

Defunct women's professional softball team

- [[File: |frameless|class=pageimage|alt=]] Logo

Information
- League: National Pro Fastpitch
- Location: Allentown, Pennsylvania, U.S.
- Ballpark: ECTB Stadium at Bicentennial Park
- Founded: 2006
- Folded: 2009
- Colors: Navy blue, red, Columbia blue, white
- Manager: Tom Kleinman
- Coach: Jeff Franquet

The Philadelphia Force was a women's professional softball team based in Allentown, Pennsylvania. From 2006 to 2009, it played as a member of National Pro Fastpitch (NPF) league until a failed sale in September 2009 put an end to the team on hiatus and ultimately ended its participation in the NPF. Their home games took place at Bicentennial Park in Allentown.

== History ==
The Philadelphia Force's inaugural season was in 2006. Two years later, the Force played in the National Pro Fastpitch championship, but were defeated by the Chicago Bandits.

One of the most prominent veterans of the Force was Natasha Watley, who also played in international competition with the United States women's national softball team. She joined the team in 2006, but her time with the Force was limited by national team commitments.

The Philadelphia Force's last season was 2009.
