= National Pro Fastpitch =

American professional women's softball league

- Formerly: Women's Pro Fastpitch, Women's Pro Softball League
- Sport: Softball
- Founded: 2004; 22 years ago
- First season: 2004
- Folded: 2021
- Country: United States
- Last champion: USSSA Pride (5 titles)
- Most titles: USSSA Pride (5 titles)
- Website: www.wprofastpitch.com

National Pro Fastpitch (NPF), formerly the Women's Pro Softball League (WPSL), was a professional women's softball league in the United States. The teams battled for the Cowles Cup.

The WPSL was founded in 1997 and folded in 2001; the NPF revived the league in 2004 and disbanded in 2021 after two cancelled seasons due to COVID-19. A new softball league, the Women's Professional Fastpitch (WPF), launched in 2022.

== Teams ==
Progression of NPF Expansion
| Years | No. of teams |
| 2004 | 6 |
| 2005 | 6 |
| 2006 | 7 |
| 2007 | 6 |
| 2008 | 6 |
| 2009 | 5 |
| 2010 | 4 |
| 2011 | 4 |
| 2012 | 4 |
| 2013 | 4 |
| 2014 | 4 |
| 2015 | 5 |
| 2016 | 6 |
| 2017 | 6 |
| 2018 | 5 |
| 2019 | 6 |
| 2020 | 5 |

=== Timeline of NPF teams ===
Timeline Key
- Current NPF teams in tan
- Former NPF members or defunct teams in blue

== History ==
=== Predecessor leagues ===
Former Utah State University softball player Jane Cowles and her collegiate coach, John Horan, developed a plan for a women's professional fastpitch softball league. In February 1989, Cowles introduced a blueprint for the league to her parents Sage and John Cowles, Jr., owners of the Cowles Media Company, who agreed to provide financial backing for the endeavor.

Field research and market studies began later that fall and continued to take place into 1993. In January 1994, plans for a barnstorming tour were announced, and 18 months later two teams, the Blaze and the Storm, composed of former collegiate all-stars played exhibition games in cities throughout the Midwest. Eight years of research and planning finally culminated in May 1997, with the Cowles family and title sponsor AT&T Wireless Services launching Women's Pro Fastpitch (WPF). The League began with six teams: Orlando Wahoos, Tampa Bay Firestix, Georgia Pride (later the Akron-based Ohio Pride), Carolina Diamonds, Durham Dragons, and Virginia Roadsters.

After completing two seasons as WPF, officials changed the name to the Women's Professional Softball League in 1998. The Orlando Wahoos moved to Akron, Ohio and become the Akron Racers, the only team which still remains in the league today.

The WPSL consisted of four teams located in the Eastern United States in 2000. The world's most talented fastpitch softball players, including former Olympians, collegiate All-Americans, and all-conference selections highlighted the 15-player rosters of the league's four squads. The Akron Racers, Florida Wahoos, (Note: This version was a new expansion team in Plant City, Florida, unrelated to the previous Orlando Wahoos that became the Akron Racers (ref)) Ohio Pride, and the Tampa Bay FireStix each participated in the WPSL regular season. The Florida Wahoos defeated the Ohio Pride in the championship series held in Springfield, Missouri.

The 2001 "Tour of Fastpitch Champions" allowed the WPSL to focus on expansion. The 2001 tour traveled to 11 cities that were targeted as WPSL expansion candidates. Competition featured games between the WPSL Gold and All-Star teams as well as Canada, the USA National Teams, and local all-star teams. Nine of these games were televised, seven on ESPN2 and two "live" on ESPN, a first for the WPSL. The season was deemed a success with more than three million households witnessing a WPSL game. Numerous cities are also being developed for future ownership in the league.

Play was suspended during the 2002 season to restructure the organization and allow the league additional time to develop and explore new expansion markets. However, a WPSL All-Star team competed in two exhibition games against the Tennessee All-Stars as part of the National Softball Association's A division Eastern World Series in Chattanooga, Tennessee. The WPSL All-Stars also conducted two clinics as part of the weekend activities.

=== NPF Launch ===
On November 21, 2002, WPSL announced a rebranding strategy and official name change to National Pro Fastpitch. Major League Baseball partnered with NPF as its Official Development Partner as a continuation of MLB's efforts to connect with female athletes and women in general.

As "Official Development Partner" in 2003, Major League Baseball provided introductions to Major League Baseball Clubs, community partners, broadcast partners and to MLB.com.

As part of its long-term sales, marketing and promotional campaign, NPF featured an All-Star Tour in 2003. The tour provided each of the league's expansion team owners with tools to lay the groundwork in their marketplace for the official launch of league play in 2004.

In 2004, the league relaunched with six teams in six markets: California Sunbirds in Stockton, California; Arizona Heat in Tucson, Arizona; Texas Thunder in Houston, Texas; Akron Racers in Akron, Ohio; New England Riptide in Lowell, Massachusetts; and NY/NJ Juggernaut in Montclair, New Jersey.

The 2004 season was distinguished by 178 league-wide games, 96 of the best female softball players in the country, the continued support of Major League Baseball as the Official Development Partner of NPF in the category of women's fastpitch softball, NPF playoffs (both best of three series went three games) and the inaugural NPF Championship with the New York/New Jersey Juggernaut capturing the Championship Cowles Cup with a victory over the New England Riptide, fourth-place finisher in the regular season.

=== New ownership (2005) ===
In December 2004, owners of the individual National Pro Fastpitch (NPF) teams announced a plan intended to transition operations of National Pro Fastpitch from the founding Cowles family to an operating group consisting of team owners.

The efforts of the new ownership group in 2005 focused on solidifying broadcast agreements locally and nationally, soliciting sponsorship support, and aligning with national softball associations to bring meaningful competition to each team market and various grassroots events across the country. The group continues to recruit new teams and strengthen team ownership in each market.

The 2005 regular season included 144 games and 23 opponents including six NPF teams, plus women's ASA major teams and international teams such as Canada, Mexico, Russia, Venezuela, China, and Australia. The season concluded the last weekend in August when the Akron Racers beat the Chicago Bandits 5–4 in extra innings to claim the NPF Championship Title.

The Juggernaut joined forces with Telecare to broadcast six games in 2005. Telecare reaches almost a million homes in the Long Island area. Comcast SportsNet Chicago aired seven original broadcasts of Chicago Bandits games in 2005. ESPN2 aired two games during the NPF Championship series. The final game was broadcast on ESPN2 with a very impressive .48 rating.

The Philadelphia Force and the Connecticut Brakettes joined NPF for the 2006 season. The Brakettes, the Akron Racers, the 2005 Regular Season Champions, the Chicago Bandits, the New England Riptide, the Arizona Heat, the Texas Thunder competed in league play during 2006. The New England Riptide defeated the Connecticut Brakettes to become champions.

For the 2007 season, The Texas Thunder moved to Rockford, Illinois to play as the Rockford Thunder. The Connecticut Brakettes left the NPF to return to exclusive amateur status. The Washington Glory was established as a new franchise, picking up many of the former Brakettes' pro players. The Arizona Heat franchise was officially suspended.

Each of the six established NPF teams played an official schedule of 44 games during 2007, including games against non-league opponents that counted in the NPF standings. The Michigan Ice played a more limited schedule as a provisional NPF team. Non-league opponents included Team China, Denso Japan, the Venezuela national team, and the Stratford Brakettes.

The league moved its playoffs to Kimberly, Wisconsin in a double-elimination format. Washington was the only team in the playoffs to go undefeated and won the championship in the first game on August 26. Rains on August 24 prevented the first day of competition to be played so all Friday games were played Saturday morning/afternoon and the scheduled Saturday games were pushed later into the evening. Monica Abbott and Cat Osterman threw no-hitters during the championship weekend.

In 2008, the league saw the addition of four more games as different international opponents appeared on the schedule and every team played in every other league city. The international opponents included Canada, Venezuela, Chinese Taipei, and Netherlands. Each team played two home series against two of the four international opponents.

The league also hosted Battle of the Bats throughout the 2008 season. At every Saturday night home game, or a selected date if a series is not played on a Saturday night, four players from each team were selected to represent a different bat manufacturer in a home-run-hitting contest. The contest puts manufacturer against manufacturer and player against player in a competition that concluded in Kimberly, Wisconsin as part of the championship weekend.

=== Contraction and expansion (2009–2021) ===
The New England Riptide did not play the 2009 season, citing economic reasons. The Washington Glory folded outright and were replaced by the USSSA Pride.

For 2011, the Diamonds became a traveling team, and the Pride split home games between two new venues. In 2012, the Diamonds relocated to Charlotte, North Carolina, and became the Carolina Diamonds. They played in various venues in North Carolina during the 2012 season.

The league announced that the Pennsylvania Rebellion would be added as an expansion team for the 2014 season, receiving the roster of the recently defunct NY/NJ Comets.

In January 2015, the league announced the Dallas Charge as an expansion team for the 2015 season. The Dallas–Fort Worth metroplex-based team will split their home games between the Ballfields at Craig Ranch in McKinney and a ballpark in Arlington.

On October 23, 2015, the NPF announced that the Scrap Yard Dawgs would join the league as an expansion team based in The Woodlands, Texas.

On January 16, 2017, the NPF announced that the ownership of the Pennsylvania Rebellion would be dissolving the team, effective immediately. All Rebellion players under contract were granted free agency.

On May 2, 2017, NPF announced the addition of an expansion team, Beijing Shougang Eagles. Its roster is to be populated with members of China women's national softball team and selected American players. For 2017, the home half Beijing's schedule was played in the home venues of the other NPF teams. Beijing is expected to announce a permanent US home location in the future.

On October 12, 2017, it was reported the Texas Charge would be dissolving, effective immediately. The NPF did not make an announcement regarding the Charge, but all Charge players under contract were added to the league's transactions page as free agents.

In an arrangement similar to the Beijing Eagles', NPF announced in December 2017 that Softball Australia would be operating a 2018 expansion team, the Aussie Spirit.

On January 28, 2018, the Scrap Yard Dawgs announced via press release they would no longer be affiliated with the NPF. However, the NPF announced they had terminated the franchise on January 29 citing that the team had violated several league operating rules and franchise requirements. The Scrap Yard Dawgs indicated they would continue as an independent team known as Scrap Yard Fastpitch for 2018. On the same day, Ohio.com reported that the Akron Racers would be replaced by a Chinese team, similar to the Beijing Eagles. However, on February 1, 2018, Akron, instead, changed their name to the Cleveland Comets. The Comets will still be an NPF travel team.

On October 30, 2018, Softball Canada announced that it will be operating an expansion team called the Canadian Wild.

On September 13, 2019, USSSA Pride announced they would not renew their partnership with NPF for the 2020 season, leaving the league after 11 years.

On November 14, 2019, the California Commotion was announced to be an expansion team, representing the league's first presence on the west coast since the 2005 season. The Commotion's first season in the league was scheduled to be in 2020.

Both the 2020 and 2021 seasons were cancelled due to the COVID-19 pandemic.

On August 1, 2021, the league announced that, due to a lack of revenue after cancelling the previous two seasons, it would be suspending operations.

== Champions ==
=== WPF/WPSL champions ===
Results
| Year | Champion | Runner up |
|---|---|---|
| 1997 | Orlando Wahoos | Virginia Roadsters |
| 1998 | Orlando Wahoos | Carolina Diamonds |
| 1999 | Tampa Bay FireStix | Akron Racers |
| 2000 | Florida Wahoos | Ohio Pride |

=== NPF Champions ===
Cowles Cup Championship results
| year | champion | runner up |
|---|---|---|
| 2004 | New York/New Jersey Juggernaut | New England Riptide |
| 2005 | Akron Racers | Chicago Bandits |
| 2006 | New England Riptide | Connecticut Brakettes |
| 2007 | Washington Glory | Rockford Thunder |
| 2008 | Chicago Bandits | Washington Glory |
| 2009 | Rockford Thunder | USSSA Pride |
| 2010 | USSSA Pride | Chicago Bandits |
| 2011 | Chicago Bandits | USSSA Pride |
| 2012 | No champion named | |
| 2013 | USSSA Pride | Chicago Bandits |
| 2014 | USSSA Pride | Akron Racers |
| 2015 | Chicago Bandits | USSSA Pride |
| 2016 | Chicago Bandits | USSSA Pride |
| 2017 | Houston Scrap Yard Dawgs | USSSA Pride |
| 2018 | USSSA Pride | Chicago Bandits |
| 2019 | USSSA Pride | Chicago Bandits |
| 2020 | Cancelled due to the COVID-19 pandemic | |
| 2021 | Cancelled due to the COVID-19 pandemic | |

== Career leaders ==
- Stats updated as of 2019. Also note that every listed player was active for at least three seasons of play, while every pitcher also reached 200 innings pitched.

=== Batting ===
| Rank | Player | BA |
|---|---|---|
| 1 | Natasha Watley | .394 |
| 2 | Crystl Bustos | .380 |
| 3 | Emily Allard | .366 |
| 4 | Jessica Mendoza | .360 |
| 5 | Caitlin Lowe | .352 |
| 6 | Kellie Wilkerson | .348 |
| 7 | Kelly Kretschman | .346 |
| 8 | Stacey Porter | .341 |
| 9 | Kristen Zaleski | .337 |
| 10 | Iyhia McMichael | .333 |
| | Nerissa Myers | .333 |

| Rank | Player | RBI |
|---|---|---|
| 1 | Kelly Kretschman | 265 |
| 2 | Megan Wiggins | 256 |
| 3 | Kristen Butler | 179 |
| 4 | Brittany Cervantes | 164 |
| 5 | Kristyn Sandberg | 161 |
| 6 | Nicole Trimboli | 157 |
| 7 | Alisa Goler | 156 |
| 8 | Nerissa Myers | 148 |
| 9 | Oli Keohohou | 140 |
| 10 | Andrea Duran | 133 |

| Rank | Player | HR |
|---|---|---|
| 1 | Megan Wiggins | 84 |
| 2 | Kelly Kretschman | 55 |
| 3 | Brittany Cervantes | 49 |
| 4 | Kristen Butler | 48 |
| 5 | Oli Keohohou | 45 |
| 6 | Kristyn Sandberg | 44 |
| 7 | Rachel Folden | 41 |
| | Shelby Pendley | 41 |
| 8 | Taylor Schlopy | 39 |
| 9 | Stacy May-Johnson | 38 |
| 10 | Crystl Bustos | 37 |

| Rank | Player | 2B |
|---|---|---|
| 1 | Kelly Kretschman | 87 |
| 2 | Megan Wiggins | 66 |
| 3 | Alisa Goler | 52 |
| 4 | Andrea Duran | 39 |
| 5 | Kristyn Sandberg | 37 |
| 6 | Brittany Cervantes | 36 |
| 7 | GiOna DiSalvatore | 35 |
| 8 | Taylor Schlopy | 33 |
| 9 | Shelby Pendley | 31 |
| 10 | Nerissa Myers | 30 |
| | Tammy Williams | 30 |

| Rank | Player | 3B |
|---|---|---|
| 1 | Megan Wiggins | 18 |
| 2 | Brenna Moss | 9 |
| | Amber Patton | 9 |
| | Natasha Watley | 9 |
| | Danielle Zymkowitz | 9 |
| 3 | Sammy Marshall | 8 |
| 4 | Vicky Galindo | 7 |
| 5 | Renada Davis | 6 |
| | Sierra Romero | 6 |

| Rank | Player | H |
|---|---|---|
| 1 | Kelly Kretschman | 512 |
| 2 | Megan Wiggins | 410 |
| 3 | Natasha Watley | 373 |
| 4 | Amber Patton | 282 |
| 5 | Nicole Trimboli | 279 |
| 6 | Stacy May-Johnson | 267 |
| 7 | Tammy Williams | 251 |
| 8 | Alisa Goler | 247 |
| 9 | Kristen Zaleski | 238 |
| 10 | Nerissa Myers | 231 |

| Rank | Player | SLG% |
|---|---|---|
| 1 | Crystl Bustos | .730% |
| 2 | Jessica Mendoza | .662% |
| 3 | Samantha Marder | .600% |
| 4 | Sierra Romero | .587% |
| 5 | Rachel Folden | .584% |
| 6 | Shelby Pendley | .566% |
| 7 | Megan Wiggins | .564% |
| 8 | Oli Keohohou | .554% |
| 9 | Nerissa Myers | .550% |
| 10 | Stacey Porter | .539% |

| Rank | Player | BB |
|---|---|---|
| 1 | Kelly Kretschman | 324 |
| 2 | Megan Wiggins | 156 |
| 3 | Alisa Goler | 139 |
| 4 | Brittany Cervantes | 136 |
| 5 | Taylor Schlopy | 134 |
| 6 | Kelley Montalvo | 131 |
| 7 | Clare Burnum | 126 |
| 8 | Oli Keohohou | 125 |
| 9 | Nerissa Myers | 124 |
| 10 | Kellie Wilkerson | 122 |
| | Kristen Zaleski | 122 |

| Rank | Player | SB |
|---|---|---|
| 1 | Kristen Zaleski | 92 |
| 2 | Shanel Scott | 85 |
| 3 | Natasha Watley | 84 |
| 4 | Megan Wiggins | 64 |
| 5 | Brenna Moss | 63 |
| 6 | Sharonda McDonald | 61 |
| | Lisa Modglin | 61 |
| 7 | Sammy Marshall | 60 |
| 8 | Kelly Kretschman | 59 |
| 9 | Clare Burnum | 58 |
| | Vicky Galindo | 58 |
| 10 | Trena Peel | 53 |

| Rank | Player | FP% |
|---|---|---|
| 1 | Allexis Bennett | 1.000% |
| | Kelsey Bruder | 1.000% |
| 2 | Jenny Topping | .997% |
| 3 | Jenna Hall | .996% |
| 4 | Alisa Goler | .994% |
| | Ashley Smith | .994% |
| | Hallie Wilson | .994% |
| 5 | Kaylyn Castillo | .993% |
| | Selena Collins | .993% |
| | Shannon Doepking | .993% |
| | Oli Keohohou | .993% |

=== Pitching ===
| Rank | Player | W |
|---|---|---|
| 1 | Monica Abbott | 131 |
| 2 | Sarah Pauly | 107 |
| 3 | Cat Osterman | 95 |
| 4 | Kristina Thorson | 56 |
| 5 | Lisa Norris | 54 |
| 6 | Jocelyn Forest | 49 |
| 7 | Rachele Fico | 45 |
| 8 | Jolene Henderson | 44 |
| | Radara McHugh | 44 |
| 9 | Desiree Serrano | 43 |
| 10 | Keilani Ricketts | 42 |
| | Christa Williams | 42 |

| Rank | Player | K |
|---|---|---|
| 1 | Monica Abbott | 1,624 |
| 2 | Cat Osterman | 1,260 |
| 3 | Sarah Pauly | 956 |
| 4 | Lisa Norris | 646 |
| 5 | Jocelyn Forest | 474 |
| 6 | Christa Williams | 465 |
| 7 | Eileen Canney | 457 |
| 8 | Kristina Thorson | 455 |
| 9 | Keilani Ricketts | 408 |
| 10 | Jennie Finch | 382 |

| Rank | Player | ERA |
|---|---|---|
| 1 | Cat Osterman | 0.91 |
| 2 | Christa Williams | 1.03 |
| 3 | Monica Abbott | 1.05 |
| 4 | Jennie Finch | 1.11 |
| 5 | Peaches James | 1.60 |
| 6 | Brandee McArthur | 1.66 |
| | Jordan Taylor | 1.66 |
| 7 | Jolene Henderson | 1.70 |
| 8 | Jocelyn Forest | 1.76 |
| 9 | Amy Harre | 1.80 |
| 10 | Gina Oaks | 1.94 |

| Rank | Player | IP |
|---|---|---|
| 1 | Sarah Pauly | 1,166.2 |
| 2 | Monica Abbott | 1,118.0 |
| 3 | Cat Osterman | 809.1 |
| 4 | Lisa Norris | 702.1 |
| 5 | Jocelyn Forest | 567.0 |
| 6 | Angel Bunner | 564.0 |
| 7 | Kristina Thorson | 559.0 |
| 8 | Desiree Serrano | 505.2 |
| 9 | Radara McHugh | 484.2 |
| 10 | Eileen Canney | 462.0 |

| Rank | Player | SH |
|---|---|---|
| 1 | Monica Abbott | 56 |
| 2 | Cat Osterman | 39 |
| 3 | Sarah Pauly | 32 |
| 4 | Christa Williams | 20 |
| 5 | Lisa Norris | 17 |
| 6 | Jennie Finch | 16 |
| | Jocelyn Forest | 16 |
| 7 | Kristina Thorson | 15 |
| 8 | Radara McHugh | 13 |
| 9 | Eileen Canney | 12 |
| 10 | Brandee McArthur | 11 |

| Rank | Player | G |
|---|---|---|
| 1 | Sarah Pauly | 217 |
| 2 | Monica Abbott | 192 |
| 3 | Angel Bunner | 142 |
| | Cat Osterman | 142 |
| 4 | Lisa Norris | 134 |
| 5 | Kristina Thorson | 129 |
| 6 | Rachele Fico | 128 |
| 7 | Jordan Taylor | 115 |
| 8 | Haylie Wagner | 113 |
| 9 | Radara McHugh | 111 |
| 10 | Jocelyn Forest | 109 |

| Rank | Player | GS |
|---|---|---|
| 1 | Sarah Pauly | 173 |
| 2 | Monica Abbott | 146 |
| 3 | Cat Osterman | 115 |
| 4 | Lisa Norris | 113 |
| 5 | Kristina Thorson | 92 |
| 6 | Angel Bunner | 80 |
| | Desiree Serrano | 80 |
| 7 | Rachele Fico | 76 |
| 8 | Jocelyn Forest | 74 |
| 9 | Jolene Henderson | 69 |
| 10 | Eileen Canney | 66 |
| | Keilani Ricketts | 66 |

| Rank | Player | CG |
|---|---|---|
| 1 | Monica Abbott | 115 |
| 2 | Sarah Pauly | 101 |
| 3 | Cat Osterman | 82 |
| 4 | Lisa Norris | 57 |
| 5 | Christa Williams | 47 |
| 6 | Eileen Canney | 43 |
| | Desiree Serrano | 43 |
| 7 | Radara McHugh | 39 |
| | Kristina Thorson | 39 |
| 8 | Katie Burkhart | 37 |
| 9 | Brandee McArthur | 35 |
| 10 | Jodie Cox | 33 |

| Rank | Player | FP% |
|---|---|---|
| 1 | Nikki Nemitz | 1.000% |
| 2 | Megan Gibson | .980% |
| | Jolene Henderson | .980% |
| 3 | Jennie Finch | .979% |
| 4 | Rachele Fico | .971% |
| 5 | Haylie Wagner | .966% |
| 6 | Desiree Serrano | .965% |
| 7 | Jamee Juarez | .963% |
| 8 | Brandee McArthur | .961% |
| | Lisa Norris | .961% |
| 9 | Angel Bunner | .960% |
| 10 | Peaches James | .959% |

| Rank | Player | Strikeout Rate |
|---|---|---|
| 1 | Cat Osterman | 10.9 |
| 2 | Monica Abbott | 10.1 |
| 3 | Jennie Finch | 9.4 |
| 4 | Jordan Taylor | 9.3 |
| 5 | Christa Williams | 7.3 |
| 6 | Katie Burkhart | 7.1 |
| | Keilani Ricketts | 7.1 |
| 7 | Eileen Canney | 6.9 |
| 8 | Danielle Henderson | 6.8 |
| | Danielle Lawrie | 6.8 |
| 9 | Peaches James | 6.7 |
| 10 | Dallas Escobedo | 6.5 |

| Rank | Player | WHIP |
|---|---|---|
| 1 | Jennie Finch | 0.68 |
| 2 | Monica Abbott | 0.75 |
| | Cat Osterman | 0.75 |
| 3 | Christa Williams | 0.87 |
| 4 | Gina Oaks | 0.97 |
| 5 | Peaches James | 0.98 |
| 6 | Jordan Taylor | 1.01 |
| 7 | Keilani Ricketts | 1.02 |
| 8 | Jolene Henderson | 1.04 |
| 9 | Kaci Clark | 1.08 |
| | Brandee McArthur | 1.08 |
| 10 | Katie Burkhart | 1.10 |

== See also ==
- Men's professional softball in the United States
- Women's sports
- Women's Professional Fastpitch
- Association of Fastpitch Professionals
- Athletes Unlimited Softball League
