= New England Riptide =

Softball team in Lowell, Massachusetts

- [[File: |frameless|class=pageimage|alt=]] Logo

Information
- League: National Pro Fastpitch
- Location: Lowell, Massachusetts
- Ballpark: Martin Softball Field
- Founded: 2004
- Folded: 2009
- Cowles Cup championships: 2006
- Colors: red, blue
- Manager: Joe Adlman
- Coach: Germaine Fairchild

The New England Riptide was a women's professional fastpitch softball team based in Lowell, Massachusetts. They began play in the 2004 season as a member of National Pro Fastpitch. Operations were suspended in February 2009.

== History ==
=== 2004 ===
The 2004 season ended with the Riptide having a record of 25 wins and 35 losses. The Riptide finished fourth in the league for the regular season. The Riptide lost the championship game to the NY/NJ Juggernaut.

=== 2005 ===
The Riptide finished the season with a record of 25 wins and 23 losses in the year following their championship appearance. The pitching staff was led by Jocelyn Forest and Danielle Henderson during the 2005 season. Forest who had an ERA of 1.09 in 77 innings pitched, finished the season with an 8-2 record. Henderson led the Riptide with 125 innings pitched, and had season ERA of 1.96 and 150 strikeouts in the 2005 season. The offense was highlighted by Kellie Wilkerson who led the Riptide in average (.435), on-base percentage (.602), slugging percentage (.681), stolen bases (6), walks (28), and home runs (4). In addition to being the leader of the offense, Wilkerson also filled in pitching during the season.

=== 2006 ===
During the 2006 season the Riptide finished with a record of 24 wins and 17 losses, in the 41 games the team played during the season. Once again Jocelyn Forest led the Riptide pitching staff. Forest recorded 15 wins during the season which was both a team and league high. In 130 innings pitched, Forest had a 1.29 ERA and 107 strikeouts. The Riptide received very well balanced offensive attack in the 2006 season with many different offensive leaders including Lyndsey Angus, Lindy Winkler, and Tarrah Beyster. Lyndsey Angus earned the NPF Player of the Year.

=== NPF championship ===
The New England Riptide defeat the Connecticut Brakettes by a 2-0 margin, to win their first ever NPF Championship. Jocelyn Forest receives the NPF Championship Series Most Valuable Player award following her impressive performance which includes striking out seven and stranding seven Brakettes on base.

=== 2007 ===
The Riptide finished the 2007 with 26 wins and 18 losses, and as a result finished 3rd in the league. Eileen Canney was the ace of the Riptide pitching staff during the 2007 season and finished the season with 9-6 record. Also during the 2007 campaign Canney had 1.16 ERA and 137 strikeouts, both of which were league highs. The Riptide also had very strong seasons from Erica Beach, Jocelyn Forest, and Danielle Henderson, who helped to anchor the pitching staff. During the 2007 season Scott Shanel led the offense with a .324 batting average, 34 stolen bases, 26 walks, and 35 runs. However, during the season the offense was very well balanced eight players having an average over .250.

=== 2008 ===
In the 2008 season the Riptide finished with a record of 22 wins and 26 losses, which earned them 4th place in the league. During the 2008 season the Riptide were led by Eileen Canney who had a 2.29 earned run average and 13 wins. Also during the 2008 season Canney had 150.1 innings pitched, and 18 complete games. On the offensive side the Riptide were led by Jackie Pasquerella and Jess Merchant. Pasquerella led the riptide in average (.354) and hits (45) for the season. Merchant provided more of the power threat leading the Riptide in home runs (6), doubles (7), and RBI's (26).

Achievements
Preceded by Akron Racers; 2005	Cowles Cup NPF Champions; New England Riptide; 2006	Succeeded by Washington Glory; 2007
