= Connecticut Brakettes =

Women's fastpitch softball team in the United States

Coordinates: 41°10′30″N 73°07′41″W

Stratford Brakettes
- [[File: |frameless|class=pageimage|alt=]] Logo

Information
- League: Amateur Softball Association
- Location: Stratford, Connecticut
- Ballpark: Frank DeLuca Hall of Fame Field
- Founded: 1947
- Colors: red, white, blue
- Management: Bob Baird
- Coach: John Stratton

The Connecticut Brakettes is a women's fastpitch softball team based in Stratford, Connecticut. The team has won many state, regional, national, and international tournaments (28 as of 2009). The team was selected for induction into the National Softball Hall of Fame in 2026.

== History ==
The team, founded in 1947 by William S. Simpson as the Raybestos Girl All-Stars, held a celebration of its 80th season in July 2026.

Over the years the team name has changed to Raybestos Brakettes (1948), Hi-Ho Brakettes, Stratford Brakettes, or Connecticut Brakettes (2006). The Brakette name is derived from the main product of the Raybestos plant in Stratford which produced brake linings for automobiles and trucks.

In 2006 the Brakettes fielded two teams. The Connecticut Brakettes were members of National Pro Fastpitch (NPF), finishing second in the regular season with a record of 27–15. In the NPF championship game, the Connecticut Brakettes lost to the fourth place New England Riptide 2–0. In 2006 they also fielded the Stratford Brakettes in the Amateur Softball Association (ASA). They won the 2006 women's major fastpitch tournament held in Amherst, New York.

The Brakettes dropped out of the NPF league in 2007, but still competes as an amateur team in the women's major division of the Amateur Softball Association (ASA).

Highlights of the Brakettes' seasons include:

year	wins	losses	post season	comments
1947	16	4	Lost in the state tournament quarter-finals in a 22–21 game	Team founded as Raybestos Girl All-Stars
1948	18	2	Eastern Coast Women's Softball championship winners	Team name changed to Raybestos Brakettes
1950			Appeared at ASA national tournament	A national tournament game against host San Antonio, Texas Thompson team is won 2–1
1956			4th-place finish in national tournament held in Clearwater, Florida	
1958	52	5	Beat the Hacienda Rockets for first ASA Women's Major Fastpitch championship	National tournament held at Raybestos Memorial Field in Stratford
1959–1960			Second and third consecutive national championship winners	
1961			3rd-place finish in 2–1 loss to eventual championship winners the Whittier, California Gold Sox	Championship held in Portland, Oregon
1965			At the first ISF Women's World Championship in Melbourne, Australia, Brakettes finish 2nd place in a loss to the host team	
1966	74	4		
1967			Winner of their 6th ASA national championship, the National All-Star Series, and the Pan American Games	
1968			Tie with Orange, California Lionettes for ASA National title (7th for the Brakettes)	
1970			2nd-place finish at ISF Women's World Championship in Osaka	
1971	57	0	ASA fastpitch national championship	
1974			1st-place finish at ISF Women's World Championship, ASA Women's Major Fastpitch champions (4th consecutive year)	ISF championship is held at Raybestos Memorial Field in Stratford
1976	44	11	ASA fastpitch national championship	John Stratton is temporary coach for disabled Ralph Raymond
1978	78	8	ASA national champions (1978 is the 8th consecutive and 15th overall championship for the Brakettes)	Bill Simpson, the team Owner came to Hayward, CA where the team won the ASA championship.
1980			ASA national champions	Championship held in East Lansing, Michigan
1985				Team name is changed to Hi-Ho Brakettes
1986			Winners of the ISF championship in Auckland, New Zealand; gold medal in U.S. Olympic Sports Festival, First place at Canada Cup in Vancouver; 2nd place ASA championship	
1990				D'Addario drops sponsorship, resumed by Raymark-Raybestos (no longer in Stratford) through 1995
1993			2nd-place finish in ASA championship against the Redding Rebels	The championship is held in Stratford at DeLuca field.
1995	57	3		
1996			4-way tie for 9th-place finish in ASA fastpitch national championship	Championship held in Stratford at DeLuca Field. Team is sponsored by David Olin Carpenter.
1997			4-way tie for 9th-place finish in ASA fastpitch national championship	
1998			4-way tie for 9th-place finish in ASA fastpitch national championship	
1999			3rd-place finish in ASA fastpitch national championship	Championship held in Stratford
2000			3rd-place finish in ASA fastpitch national championship	
2001			3rd-place finish in ASA fastpitch national championship	
2002	78	1	ASA Women's Major Fastpitch champions (24th)	Championship held in Stratford at DeLuca Field.
2003	65	5	ASA Women's Major Fastpitch champions (25th) 4th-place finish at Canada Cup	
2004	50	4	ASA Women's Major Fastpitch champions (26th)	
2005	51	17	2nd-place finish in ASA fastpitch national championship	Championship held in Stratford at DeLuca Field.
2006	27	15	2nd-place finish in NPF	Team called Connecticut Brakettes in the NPF league
2006	46	4	1st-place finish in ASA Major fastpitch tournament (27th) in Amherst, New York against the Southern California Sliders	Team called Stratford Brakettes in the ASA league
2007			ASA Women's Major Fastpitch champions (28th)	Only an ASA team is fielded this season
2008			3rd-place finish in ASA fastpitch national championship	
2009	49	7	4th place after 1–0 loss to Stratford Breakers	Regional ASA championship held in Stratford at DeLuca Field
Total	> 3,242		3 ISF Women's World Championship, 28 ASA National Championships, 19 National Hall of Fame members, and 11 Olympians	

== Players ==
Notable Brakette players have included:

- Shirley Topley (born April 14, 1934) played 1963–1964 with the Brakettes, coached the Orange, California Lionettes, was inducted into the national hall of fame in 1981.
- E. Louise "Lou" Albrecht (born November 19, 1934) played 1969 with the Brakettes, was inducted to the national hall of fame in 1985.
- Rosemary "Micki" Macchietto Stratton (born July 12, 1938) played 1956–1965 and was elected to the national hall of fame in 1969.
- Joan Joyce (born 1940) played 1954–1963 and 1967–1975 (19 seasons) for the Brakettes, was inducted into the National Softball Hall of Fame and Museum in 1983, the International Softball Federation Hall of Fame in 1999, and has been coach of the Florida Atlantic University softball team since its founding.
- Billie Moore (born May 5, 1943) played 1969–1972 with the Brakettes, went on to become an accomplished Olympic and college basketball coach.
- Donna Lopiano (born 1946) played 1965–1972 with the Brakettes, also played at the first ISF Women's World Championship in Melbourne, Australia in 1965. Inducted to the Hall of Fame in 1983.
- Sharron Backus (born February 12, 1946) played 1969–1975 with the Brakettes, was inducted to the national hall of fame in 1985, and was head coach of softball at UCLA from 1975 to 1997 which included 9 wins of the Women's College World Series.
- Bertha Ragan Tickey played 1956–1968 with the Brakettes, was inducted into the national hall of fame in 1972.
- Peggy Kellers (born March 19, 1948) played 1964–1974 for the Brakettes, was softball coach at the University of Virginia 1993–1997, and was inducted to the National Hall of Fame in 1986.
- Patty Harrison played 1964–1972 with the Brakettes, was inducted into the national hall of fame in 1976.
- Kathryn "Sis" King played 1965–1967 with the Brakettes, was inducted into the national hall of fame in 1975.
- Wiltraud "Willie" Roze (born November 8, 1948) played 1965–1975 and was elected to the national hall of fame in 1985.
- Rose Marie "Rosie" Adams (born August 22, 1951) played 1971–1974 and was elected to the national hall of fame in 1987.
- Sue Tomko (born July 1953) played 1971–1974
- Barabara Reinalda (born February 13, 1957) played 1976–1994 with the Brakettes, was inducted into the national hall of fame in 1999.
- Dot Richardson (born 1961) played 1984–1994 for the Brakettes then went on to win a gold medal in the 1996 Olympic games, and was inducted into the Hall of Fame in 2006.
- Sheila Cornell-Douty (born 1962) played 1988–1994 for the Brakettes then went on to win gold medals in the 1996 and 2000 Olympic games, and was inducted into the National Hall of Fame in 2006, and the ISF Hall of Fame in 2007.
- Diane "Schuie" Schumacher played 1976–1986 with the Brakettes, was the head coach of the Netherlands women's national softball team in 1987, was inducted into the national hall of fame in 1992 and the ISF hall of fame in 1993.
- Gina Vecchione (born 1965) played 1978–1989, has coached at UCLA, UC Berkeley, and Oregon State University; was inducted into the national hall of fame in 1997.
- Kathy Arendsen played 1978–1992 was elected to the national hall of fame in 1996 and the ISF hall of fame and the Michigan Sports Hall of Fame both in 2003.
- Pat Dufficy played 1977–1983, 1985–1995, 1997 (19 seasons) with the Brakettes, was inducted into the national hall of fame in 2005.
- Lisa Fernandez (born 1971) played in the 1990 through 1994 seasons with the Brakettes, three time Olympic gold medalist.
- Courtney Blades (born 1978) pitched one 5 game tournament in 2000, including a perfect game.
- Kelly Kretschman (born 1979) played in the 2003 and 2006 seasons.
- Cat Osterman (born 1983) played in the 2001, 2002, and 2005 seasons.
- Andrea Duran (born 1984) played in the 2006 season and went on to win a gold medal in the 2006 ISF World Championship and a silver medal in the 2008 Olympics.
- Katie Burkhart (born 1986) played in the 2007 season.

== Coaches ==
Brakette coaches have included:

- Bernie Kaplan 1947–1956 seasons
- Vin Cullen 1957–1961
- Vincent "Wee" Devitt (April 10, 1912 – March 17, 1988) Brakette manager 1962–1967, also Raybestos Cardinal manager and National Softball Hall of Fame and Museum member.
- Ralph Raymond 1968–1994 – two-time Olympic team coach (1996, 2000) and Hall of Fame manager
- John Stratton 1995–present

== Stadium ==
The Brakettes played from 1947 through 1987 at Raybestos Memorial Field near the center of the town of Stratford. In 1974 Raybestos Memorial hosted the ISF Women's World Championship in which the United States beat Japan for the gold medal. Starting in the 1988 season they played at a field that was originally built in 1966 and has been known as Avco Lycoming Field, Textron Lycoming Field, AlliedSignal Field, and was renamed Frank DeLuca Hall of Fame Field in 1997. Frank "Hooks" DeLuca was a pitcher for the men's slowpitch team sponsored by Avco Lycoming in Stratford who was inducted into the National Softball Hall of Fame in 1974. In addition to the Brakettes, DeLuca Field is home to the Stratford Breakers and Stratford Seahawks softball teams, the Stratford High School girls' softball team, the Stratford Police Athletic League girls' softball teams, the Men's Industrial Slow Pitch League, and the Stratford Recreation Department Slow Pitch League games.
