= Akron Racers =

Softball team in Akron, Ohio

- Logo

Information
- League: National Pro Fastpitch
- Location: Akron, Ohio
- Ballpark: Firestone Stadium
- Founded: 1999
- Cowles Cup championships: 2005
- Colors: black, red, grey
- Retired numbers: 4, 6, 24, 43
- Ownership: Craig Stout
- General manager: Stephen Dunn

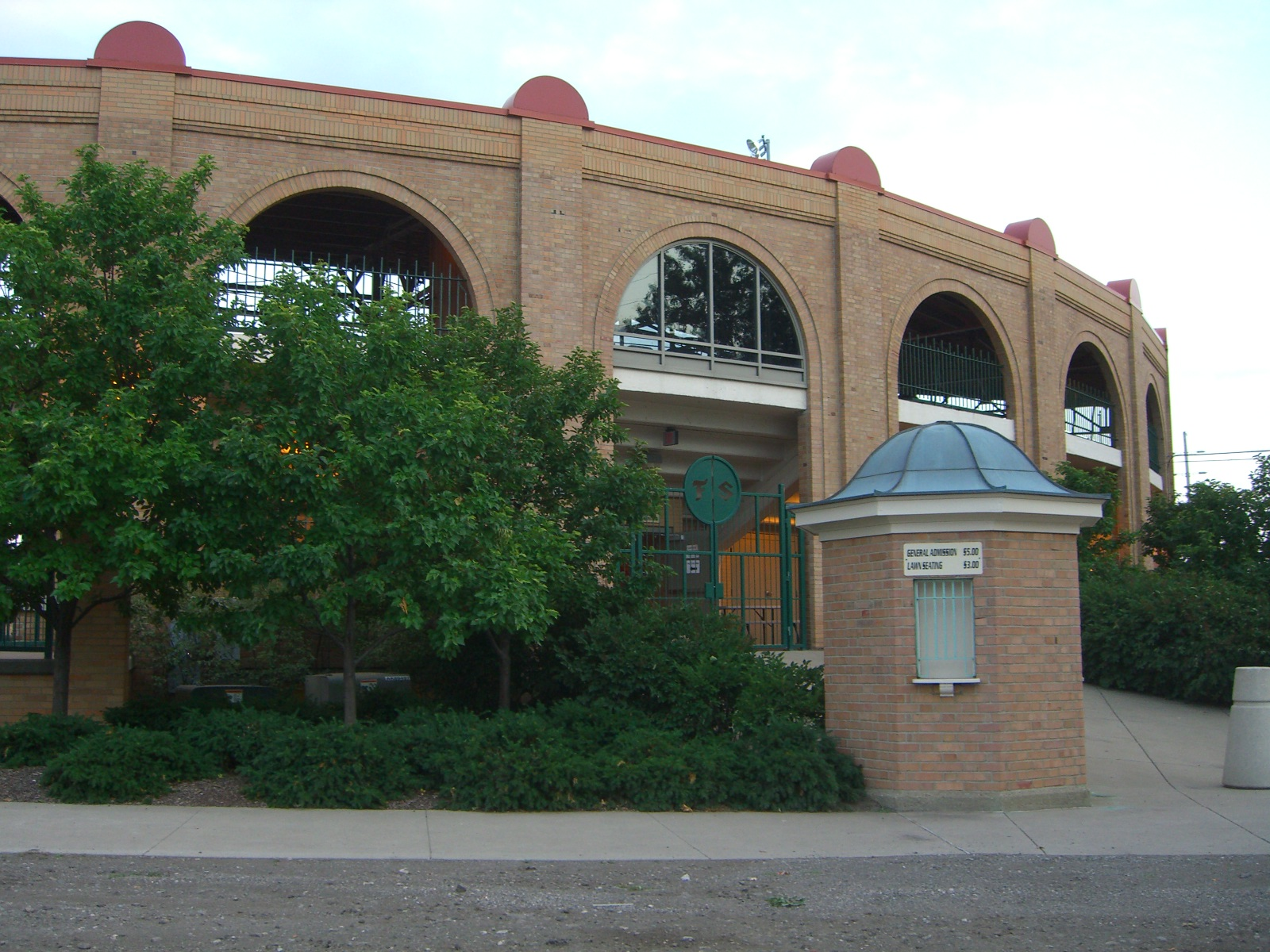
Exterior of Firestone Stadium, site of Akron Racer home games.

The Akron Racers were a women's softball team based in Akron, Ohio. In 2018 they moved to Cleveland and were renamed the Cleveland Comets. The team was started by Joey Arietta in 1999 to participate in the Women's Pro Softball League (WPSL). From 2004-2017, they have played as a member of National Pro Fastpitch (NPF).

== History ==
The Akron Racers became the first Midwest franchise to begin play in the WPSL in 1999. The league suspended play in Orlando and assigned the Wahoos roster to the Racers. In 2000, the league consolidated sending the Georgia Pride team to Akron. The team was renamed the Ohio Pride. Both teams began sharing Firestone Stadium

In their first year the Racers made it to the championship of the WPSL, but lost to the Tampa Bay FireStix.

The WPSL suspended operations in 2001; the Racers was the only team of the four 2001 teams to revive when the league reformed as the NPF in 2004. In 2005 the Racers beat the Chicago Bandits to win the NPF championship. From 2004 to 2008, the Akron Racers have compiled an all-time win–loss record of 149-94.

Crystl Bustos was named manager in October 2009, replacing Barb Sherwood.

The Racers upset the highly favored Chicago Bandits in the 2014 NPF Championship Series in Hoover, AL in the best two-of-three to move on to face the USSSA Pride. The Racers and Pride battle for eighth innings before the Pride pushed across a run on the bottom of the eighth inning to take the 1-0 advantage. The Racers could not hold off the Pride in game two dropping the 8-3 decision.

The Racers grabbed Coach of the Year honors (Brian Levin & Dustin Combs), Offensive Player of the Year (Nerissa Myers) and Jennie Finch Award (Kelley Montalvo). Five Racers were named to the All-NPF Team including Myers, Montalvo, Rachele Fico and rookies Jill Barrett and Ashley Thomas.

=== 2015 ===
Of their selections in the 2015 NPF Draft, the Racers signed Griffin Joiner of Kentucky, Shellie Robinson of USC Upstate, and Megan Low of UTSA.

=== 2016 ===
Rawlings awarded their first Gold Glove to a female in 2016, and the Racers' AJ Andrews was the initial recipient.

==== 15th Anniversary Impact Honorees ====
To celebrate their 15th anniversary, a milestone marking them as one of the longest-running pro female sports franchises, the Racers announced the would be naming 30 members of a Racers' "Impact" team. These 30 players are an all-star collection of players throughout the Racers' 15 years, chosen by a panel evaluating those who had the most impact on the team.

The Impact honorees were made public one at a time on the Racers' website. Following is the full List of 2016 Akron Racers IMPACT Honorees

1. Carla Brookbank-Schaal	9. Radara McHugh	17. Angela Tincher	25. Nerissa Myers
2. Crystl Bustos	10. Iyhia McMichael	18. Norelle Dickson	26. Charlotte Morgan
3. Amy Kyler	11. Nicole Trimboli	19. Jackie Pasquerella	27. Rachele Fico
4. Sarah Dawson	12. Brandee McArthur	20. Lisa Modglin	28. Ashley Thomas
5. Nicole Odom Reis	13. Jenny Topping	21. Lisa Norris	29.Taylor Schlopy
6. Tobin Echo-Hawk	14. Oli Keohohou	22. Sam Marder	30. Kelley Montalvo
7. Kellyn Tate	15. Kristen Butler	23. Jill Barrett	
8. Kristin Johnson	16. Veronica Wootson	24. Ayumi Karino	

=== 2017 ===
Citing a desire to focus on his position as coach of the Belmont Bruins softball team, Brian Levin stepped down as the Racers' head coach. The Racers' record was 4-5 on June 16.

The Racers finished the regular season in third place, and were swept by the Scrap Yard Dawgs in the first round of the playoffs.

== General managers ==
- Joey Arrietta (-present)

== All-time head coaches ==
#	Name	Term	Regular season				Playoffs			
#	Name	Term	GC	W	L	W%	GC	W	L	W%
1	Brian Levin	2014-2017	146	68	78	.460	9	2	7	.222
1	Charlotte Morgan	2017	41	22	19	.537	2	0	2	.000

== Season-by-season ==
Season records
Season	W	L	T	Finish	Playoff results
1999	34	32	0	2nd place WPSL	Lost to Virginia Roadsters in WPSL Semifinals
2000	15	17	0	3rd place WPSL	Did not qualify
2004	39	21	0	2nd place National Pro Fastpitch	Lost to NY/NJ Juggernaut in NPF Semifinals
2005	36	10	0	2nd place National Pro Fastpitch	Won NPF Championship
2006	29	17	0	3rd place National Pro Fastpitch	Lost to Connecticut Brakettes in NPF Semifinals
2007	26	17	0	2nd place National Pro Fastpitch	Eliminated by Rockford Thunder in Game 3
2008	19	29	0	5th place National Pro Fastpitch	Did not qualify
2009	26	14	0	2nd place National Pro Fastpitch	Lost to Rockford Thunder in NPF Semifinals
2010	24	25	0	3rd place National Pro Fastpitch	Lost to USSSA Pride in NPF Semifinals
2011	22	17	0	2nd place National Pro Fastpitch	Lost to Chicago Bandits in NPF Semifinals
2012	14	30	0	4th place National Pro Fastpitch	Lost to USSSA Pride in NPF Semifinals
2013	16	32	0	3rd place National Pro Fastpitch	Lost to USSSA Pride in Game 2 of NPF Championship Semifinals
2014	24	24	0	3rd place National Pro Fastpitch	Lost to USSSA Pride in NPF Finals
2015	22	26	0	3rd place National Pro Fastpitch	Lost to Chicago Bandits in NPF Semifinals
2016	22	28	0	4th place National Pro Fastpitch	Lost to USSSA Pride in NPF Semifinals
2017	26	24	0	3rd place National Pro Fastpitch	Lost to Scrap Yard Dawgs in NPF Semifinals
WPSL Totals	49	49	0		
WPSL and NPF Totals	394	363	0		
NPF Totals	345	314	0		

== Notable players ==
- Crystl Bustos (1999, 2005, 2006)

== Retired numbers ==
The Racers have retired four numbers:

Player	Number
Carla Brookbank-Schaal	4
Crystl Bustos	6
Amy Kyler	24
Duke Justice (Note: The number 43 is also retired in honor of Duke Justice, who served as a groundskeeper at Firestone Stadium for 43 years.)	43

== Current players ==
Akron Racers roster
Active roster (YYYY = Final season of player contract)		Inactive roster	Coaches
Pitchers: 7 Megan Betsa (2019); 8 Alexis Silkwood (2018); 12 Jailyn Ford (2017); 17 Sara Groenewegen (2019); 33 Emily Weiman (2017); 37 Rachele Fico (2017); 44 Laura Winter (2017); 51 Aimee Creger (2017)	Catchers: 13 Griffin Joiner (2017); 15 Hannah Day (2017); 42 Shelby Hiers (2017); Utility players: 11 Kristen Wyckoff (2017); 21 Chandler Rice (2017); Infielders: 1 Ashley Thomas (2017); 5 Sami Fagan (2017); 10 Kelley Montalvo (2017); 20 Haley Fagan (2018); 21 Chandler Rice (2017); 23 Maddy Grimm (2019); 52 Sam Fischer (2017); Outfielders: 3 Shellie Robinson (2017); 9 AJ Andrews (2017); 11 Kristen Wyckoff (2017); 14 Megan Geer (2018); 25 Jennifer Gilbert (2017); 29 Nicole Schroeder (2017)	Unsigned Draftees (Year Team's Rights Expire): Chloe Miller (2018); Sydni Emanuel (2018); Derostered but Under Contract (Year Contract Expires): Taylor Schlopy (2017); Alex Hugo (2017)	Legend: * Franchise Player Tag; (C) Captain; (A) Alternate captain; → All NPF rosters

Achievements
Preceded by NY/NJ Juggernaut; 2004	Cowles Cup NPF Champions; Akron Racers; 2005	Succeeded by New England Riptide; 2006
