= Arizona Heat =

Women's softball team

- Logo

Information
- League: National Pro Fastpitch
- Location: Tucson, Arizona
- Ballpark: Hi Corbett Field
- Founded: 2004
- Folded: 2007
- League championships: 0
- Colors: Purple, orange
- General manager: Doug Leary

The Arizona Heat was a women's softball team based in Tucson, Arizona. From the 2004 season, it played as a member of National Pro Fastpitch. The team's home games were played at historic Hi Corbett Field.

Six of the players on the 2006 roster played college softball at the University of Arizona, and two more played for Arizona State University.

The team was suspended in February 2007 and ceased operations.

== Notable players ==
- Jessica Mendoza – Outfield
- Danielle Henderson – Pitcher
