= 2000 WPSL Draft =

General information
- Sport: softball
- Date(s): December 4, 1999
- Location: St. Petersburg, FL

Overview
- League: Women's Pro Softball League
- Teams: 4
- First selection: Elite/Supplemental Draft: Nina Lindenburg SS; Fresno State selected by Florida Wahoos Senior Draft: Amanda Scott P Fresno State selected by Ohio Pride National Team Draft: Lisa Fernandez P selected by Akron Racers

The 2000 WPSL Drafts were held on December 4, 1999, at the Tradewinds Resort in St. Petersburg, Florida during the National Fastpitch Coaches Association (NFCA) Convention for the 2000 season. Draft Day 2000 actually featured three drafts:

- The 2000 Elite/Supplemental Draft selected players from a pool of players on the rosters of the Durham Dragons and Carolina Diamonds, 1999 USA Softball Olympic Trial and Olympic Festival invitees who had completed their collegiate eligibility, and WPSL players who were not on their teams' protected list. The players from the Diamonds and the Dragons were available to draft because the teams were contracted and their players unassigned.
- The 2000 Senior Draft selected from collegiate senior fastpitch players.
- The 2001 National Team Draft drew from the 2000 USA Olympic roster, with the hope the players selected would play in the WPSL in 2001. (However, the WPSL suspended play before the 2001 season.)

^{+}	Denotes player who has been selected to at least one All-NPF team/NPF All-Star team/WPSL All-Star team, played for WPSL Gold in 2001, and/or NPF All-Stars in (2003)
^{#}	Denotes player who has not played in the WPSL or the NPF (Note: Unless otherwise noted, this was verified against the Historical Roster on the NPF's website.'"`UNIQ--ref-00000006-QINU`"')

Position key:
C = Catcher; UT = Utility infielder; INF = Infielder; 1B = First base; 2B =Second base SS = Shortstop; 3B = Third base; OF = Outfielder; RF = Right field; CF = Center field; LF = Left field; P = Pitcher; RHP = right-handed Pitcher; LHP = left-handed Pitcher; DP =Designated player
Positions are listed as combined for those who can play multiple positions.

== 2000 Women's Pro Softball League Elite/Supplemental Draft ==
Prior to the Elite/Supplemental Draft, each of the existing WPSL teams presented a listed of 'protected players' from their rosters. Rostered players who were not on the protected list could be drafted by any of the three other teams. Each team was allowed to protect six to eight of the players on their rosters. Protecting more than six players forced teams to surrender picks in rounds seven and eight of the elite/supplemental draft.

In addition to the unprotected players, the pool of players eligible to be drafted in the Elite/Supplemental draft included players on the rosters of the former Durham Dragons and the former Carolina Diamonds, and 1999 USA Softball Olympic Trial and Olympic Festival invitees who had completed their collegiate eligibility.

Following are the Protected Player Lists:

Akron Racers' Protected Players
Player	Pos.	College
Carla Brookbank^{+}	P/1B	Kent State University
Liza Brown	OF/P	DePaul University
Traci Conrad^{+}	OF	University of Michigan
Sarah Dawson	P	Northeast Louisiana University
Amy Kyler^{+}	P	Cleveland State University
Kellyn Tate^{+}	OF	University of Michigan
Nicole Odom^{+}	SS	UCLA
Tobin Echo-Hawk^{+}	2B	University of Nebraska

Florida Wahoos' Protected Players
Player	Pos.	College
Desarie Knipfer^{+}	P	Cal Poly San Luis Obispo
Stephanie Klaviter^{+}	P	University of Minnesota
Patti Benedict^{+}	OF	University of Michigan
Julie Crandall^{+}	C	UNLV
Randi Berg	2B	Fresno State University
Kendall Richards^{+}	3B	Texas A&M University

Ohio Pride's Protected Players
Player	Pos.	College
Kaci Clark^{+}	P	UCLA
Sarah Fredstrom	2B/SS	Colorado State University
Tamara Ivie^{+}	OF/1B	Cal State Northridge
Sarah Pickering	2B	University of Washington
Cheri Shinn^{+}	3B/OF	Cal State Northridge
Priscilla Welch	OF	Illinois State University

Tampa Bay FireStix' Protected Players
Player	Pos.	College
Heather Compton^{+}	P	UCLA
Nancy Evans^{+}	SS	University of Arizona
Sara Graziano^{+}	1B/DP	Coastal Carolina University
Marty Laudato^{+}	C	Bloomsburg (Pa.) University
Christine Parris-Washington^{+}	3B	UNLV
Venus Taylor^{+}	OF	Western Illinois University
Monica Triner	P	University of South Florida
DeeDee Weiman-Garcia^{+}	P	UCLA

Following are the selections from the Elite/Supplemental Draft:

=== Round 1 ===
Pick	Player	Pos.	WPSL Team	College	Previous team
1	Nina Lindenberg^{+}	SS	Florida Wahoos	Fresno St.
2	Julie Smith^{+}	2B	Ohio Pride	Fresno St.	1996 U.S. Olympic Team
3	Monica Armendarez^{+}	3B	Akron Racers	Indiana University	Carolina Diamonds
4	Holly Aprile^{#}	OF	Tampa Bay FireStix	University of Massachusetts	United States National Team participant (1993–99)

=== Round 2 ===
Pick	Player	Pos.	WPSL Team	College	Previous team
5	Stephanie Little^{+}	C	Ohio Pride	Cal State Fullerton	Durham Dragons
6	Jen Smith^{+}	C	Akron Racers	University of Nebraska	Durham Dragons
7	Jen Cline	C	Tampa Bay FireStix	University of Washington	Virginia Roadsters
8	Kim Maher^{+}	3B/OF/DP	Florida Wahoos	Fresno St.	1996 U.S. Olympic Team

=== Round 3 ===
Pick	Player	Pos.	WPSL Team	College	Previous team
9	Andrea D'Innocenzo	OF	Akron Racers	University of Connecticut	Carolina Diamonds
10	Barbara Jordan^{+}	OF	Tampa Bay FireStix	Cal State Northridge	Virginia Roadsters/1996 U.S. Olympic Team Alternate
11	Dawn Wuthrich	OF	Florida Wahoos	Texas A&M University	Carolina Diamonds
12	Jamie Foutch^{+}	1B	Ohio Pride	Oklahoma State University

=== Round 4 ===
Pick	Player	Pos.	WPSL Team	College	Previous team
13	Jodi Chmielewski	OF	Tampa Bay FireStix	Oregon State University	Tampa Bay FireStix
14	Keri Lemasters	2B	Florida Wahoos (Note: Lemasters did not play for the Wahoos)	Michigan State University	Durham Dragons
15	Patti Raduenz^{+}	SS	Ohio Pride	Michigan State University	Durham Dragons
16	Danielle Cox^{+}	OF	Akron Racers	Florida State University	Georgia Pride

=== Round 5 ===
Pick	Player	Pos.	WPSL Team	College	Previous team
17	Lynette Velazquez	1B	Florida Wahoos	University of Oklahoma	Georgia Pride
18	Catherine Davie	OF	Ohio Pride	University of Michigan	University of Michigan
19	Jane Teixeira^{#}	OF	Akron Racers	University of Texas
20	Amber Wright	OF	Tampa Bay FireStix	University of South Florida	Tampa Bay FireStix

=== Round 6 ===
Pick	Player	Pos.	WPSL Team	College	Previous team
21	Brandee McArthur^{+}	P	Ohio Pride	University of the Pacific	Carolina Diamonds
22	Kelli Metzger	C	Akron Racers	University of Akron	Akron Racers
23	Christy Hebert	SS	Tampa Bay FireStix (Note: Hebert did not play for the FireStix)	University of Iowa	Carolina Diamonds
24	Jen Buford	2B	Florida Wahoos	Colorado State University	Carolina Diamonds

=== Round 7 ===
Pick	Player	Pos.	WPSL Team	College	Previous team
25	Jodi Otten	OF	Florida Wahoos	Louisiana State University	Durham Dragons
26	Alison Johnsen^{#}	OF	Ohio Pride	University of Arizona

=== Round 8 ===
Pick	Player	Pos.	WPSL Team	College	Previous team
27	Scia Maumausolo^{+}	DP/C	Florida Wahoos	Cal State Northridge	Virginia Roadsters
28	Mandy Galas	OF	Ohio Pride (Note: Galas did not play for the Ohio Pride in 2000)	University of Massachusetts	Georgia Pride

== 2000 Women's Pro Softball League Senior Draft ==
Following are the selections from the Senior Draft:

=== Round 1 ===
Pick	Player	Pos.	WPSL Team	College
1	Amanda Scott^{+} (Note: Scott did not play for the Pride, but did play for the NY/NJ Juggernaut in the NPF.'"`UNIQ--ref-00000016-QINU`"')	P	Ohio Pride (Note: The Pride acquired the first overall pick and two additional selections from the Wahoos for 1999 WPSL MVP and two-time WPSL Pitcher of the Year Kaci Clark.'"`UNIQ--ref-00000018-QINU`"')	Fresno State
2	Courtney Blades^{#}	P	Ohio Pride	University of Southern Mississippi
3	Amy Berman^{#}	SS	Akron Racers	University of Southern Mississippi
4	Audra Thomas	C	Tampa Bay FireStix	Kennesaw State University

=== Round 2 ===
Pick	Player	Pos.	WPSL Team	College
5	Tina Kinney^{#}	P	Ohio Pride	Central Michigan University
6	Jennifer Lizama	2B	Akron Racers	University of Nebraska
7	Lea Mishlan^{#}	SS	Tampa Bay FireStix	University of South Florida
8	Alyson Carter^{#}	C/1B	Ohio Pride (Note: Florida Wahoos → Ohio Pride: The Pride received this pick from the Wahoos as compensation for Kaci Clark'"`UNIQ--ref-0000001A-QINU`"')	Colorado State University

=== Round 3 ===
Pick	Player	Pos.	WPSL Team	College
9	Ashlee Ducote	3B	Akron Racers	Louisiana State University
10	Keri McCallum^{#}	UT	Tampa Bay FireStix	Mississippi State University
11	Kaci Coffee^{#}	3B	Ohio Pride (Note: Florida Wahoos → Ohio Pride: The Pride received this pick from the Wahoos as compensation for Kaci Clark'"`UNIQ--ref-0000001C-QINU`"')	University of Mississippi
12	Jen Collins^{#}	OF	Ohio Pride	University of Southern Mississippi

=== Round 4 ===
Pick	Player	Pos.	WPSL Team	College
13	Lyndsey Klein^{+}	SS/2B	Tampa Bay FireStix	UCLA
14	Julie Marshall (Note: Marshall did not play for the Wahoos, but did play for the California Sunbirds in the NPF.)^{+}	1B/C	Florida Wahoos	UCLA
15	Tiffany Clark^{#}	OF	Ohio Pride	University of Louisiana-Lafayette
16	Melissa Gentile^{#}	C	Akron Racers	University of Michigan

=== Round 5 ===
Pick	Player	Pos.	WPSL Team	College
17	Kellie Wiginton^{#}	C	Florida Wahoos	Stanford University
18	Amanda Michalsky^{#}	OF	Ohio Pride	University Texas-San Antonio
19	Jamie Graves^{#}	P	Akron Racers	University of Washington
20	Jennifer Spediacci^{#}	P	Tampa Bay FireStix	University of Washington

=== Round 6 ===
Pick	Player	Pos.	WPSL Team	College
21	Jessica Polo^{#}	SS	Ohio Pride	Iowa State University
22	Jeanine Giordano^{#}	C	Akron Racers	University of Washington
23	Stacey Phillips^{#}	SS/1B/DP	Tampa Bay FireStix	Michigan State University
24	Tarrah Beyster^{+}	P	Florida Wahoos (Note: Beyster did not play for the Wahoos, but did play for the NPF All-Stars (2003), Arizona Heat(2004), and New England Riptide(2006-07).)	Oregon State University

== 2001 Women's Pro Softball League National Team Draft ==
Following are the selections from the National Team Draft:

=== Round 1 ===
Pick	Player	Pos.	WPSL Team	College
1	Lisa Fernandez^{+}	P	Akron Racers (Note: Fernandez did not play for the Racers, but did play for the WPSL Gold in 2001.)	UCLA
2	Michelle Smith^{+}	P	Florida Wahoos (Note: Smith did not play for the Wahoos, but did play for the WPSL Gold in 2001 and the NPF's NY/NJ Juggernaut in 2004.)	Oklahoma State University
3	Dot Richardson^{#}	SS	Tampa Bay FireStix	UCLA
4	Danielle Henderson^{+}	P	Ohio Pride (Note: Henderson did not play for the Pride, but did play for the WPSL Gold in 2001, and in the NPF with Akron Racers (2004) and New England Riptide (2005-07).)	University of Massachusetts

=== Round 2 ===
Pick	Player	Pos.	WPSL Team	College
5	Shelia Douty^{+}	1B	Florida Wahoos (Note: Douty did not play for the Wahoos, but did play for the WPSL Gold in 2001.)	UCLA
6	Lori Harrigan^{#}	P	Tampa Bay FireStix	UNLV
7	Laura Berg^{+}	OF	Ohio Pride (Note: Berg did not play for the Pride, but did play for the WPSL Gold in 2001.)	Fresno State University
8	Jennifer Brundage^{+}	3B	Akron Racers (Note: Brundage did not play for the Racers, but did play for the WPSL Gold in 2001.)	UCLA

=== Round 3 ===
Pick	Player	Pos.	WPSL Team	College
9	Jennifer McFalls^{+}	SS	Tampa Bay FireStix (Note: McFalls did not play for the Firestix, but did play for the WPSL Gold in 2001.)	Texas A&M University
10	Christa Williams^{+}	P	Ohio Pride (Note: Fernandez did not play for the Racers, but did play in the NPF for the Texas Thunder(2004-06).)	University of Texas
11	Christie Ambrosi^{#}	OF	Akron Racers	UCLA
12	Leah O'Brien-Amico^{#}	OF	Florida Wahoos	University of Arizona

=== Round 4 ===
Pick	Player	Pos.	WPSL Team	College
13	Michelle Venturella^{+}	C	Ohio Pride (Note: Venturella did not play for the Pride, but did play for the WPSL Gold in 2001 and previously for the Durham Dragons in 1999.)	Indiana University
14	Crystl Bustos^{+}	SS	Akron Racers	Palm Beach Community College
15	Teri Klement^{+}	SS	Florida Wahoos (Note: Teri Klement-Goldberg did not play for the Wahoos, but did play for the WPSL Gold in 2001.)	Colorado State University
16	Shelly Stokes^{#}	C	Tampa Bay FireStix	Fresno State University
