= 2001 Women's Pro Softball League season =

2001 WPSL Season
- League: Women's Pro Softball League
- Sport: softball

2001 WPSL Draft

WPSL seasons
- 2000 2002

The 2001 Women's Professional Softball League season was the first year that the WPSL suspended play before relaunching the league in 2004 under the name National Pro Fastpitch. From 1997, WPSL operated under the names Women's Pro Fastpitch (WPF) and Women's Pro Softball League (WPSL).

== Teams ==
When the WPSL suspended the 2001 season, there were four teams in the league: Tampa Bay FireStix, Akron Racers, Ohio Pride, and Florida Wahoos. When the league relaunched in 2004 as the NPF, the Racers were the only WPSL team to continue playing.

== Milestones and Events ==
The 2001 year began as normally scheduled for the WPSL. The league had its draft in December 2000 and had a schedule for the upcoming season. However, on February 27, 2001, WPSL announced that the 2001 had been cancelled, and the league would focus on expansion for a league relaunch in 2002. (The relaunch was eventually postponed until 2004.) To maintain public awareness of the league and to test future markets for expansion, in lieu of a WPSL season the league sponsored the "Tour of Fastpitch Champions" during the summer, featuring a team of WPSL All-Stars against a team of USA and international Olympians, called WPSL Gold.

The WPSL announced a plan to restart play in "six to eight markets in 2002, with growth to 12 markets by 2004." The tour moved through 14 cities, as the two WPSL teams played each other and other international and local all-stars. Ten of these games were televised, eight on ESPN2 and two "live" on ESPN, a first for the WPSL. In 2002, the league continued to explore where its new teams would play, and had a 2003 tour as an opener to the return of league play in 2004.

=== College Draft ===
Before play was suspended, WPSL held their regularly scheduled 2001 WPSL Senior Draft. Many draftees never played in the league, but some did, even making an All-Star team. These results are indicated below.

| ^{+} | Denotes player who has been selected for at least NPF All-Star team |
| ^{#} | Denotes player who never played in the NPF |

=== Draft Selections ===
==== Round 1 ====
| Pick | Player | Pos. | College | Drafted by | WPSL/NPF Experience |
|---|---|---|---|---|---|
| 1 | Courtney Dale^{#} | P/OF | UCLA | Tampa Bay FireStix | Never played in NPF |
| 2 | Lindsey Collins^{+} | C | Arizona | Akron Racers | NPF All-Stars(2003), NY/NJ Juggernaut(2004) |
| 3 | Becky Lemke^{#} | P | Arizona | Ohio Pride | Never played in NPF |
| 4 | Ashley Lewis^{#} | P | LSU | Florida Wahoos | Never played in NPF |

==== Round 2 ====
| Pick | Player | Pos. | College | Drafted by | WPSL/NPF Experience |
|---|---|---|---|---|---|
| 5 | Allison Andrade | INF | Arizona | Akron Racers | NPF All-Stars(2003), California Sunbirds(2004) |
| 6 | Lisa Carey^{#} | SS | Oklahoma | Ohio Pride | Never played in NPF |
| 7 | Ashli Barrett^{#} | C | Oklahoma | Florida Wahoos | Never played in NPF |
| 8 | Kim DePaul^{#} | 3B | Washington | Tampa Bay FireStix | Never played in NPF |

==== Round 3 ====
| Pick | Player | Pos. | College | Drafted by | WPSL/NPF Experience |
|---|---|---|---|---|---|
| 9 | Serita Brooks^{#} | OF | Florida State | Ohio Pride | Never played in NPF |
| 10 | Lauren Bauer | OF | Arizona | Florida Wahoos | NPF All-Stars(2003), NY/NJ Juggernaut(2004), Arizona Heat(2005) |
| 11 | Ginger Jones-Powers | 1B | Alabama | Tampa Bay FireStix | Texas Thunder(2004) |
| 12 | Racheal Goodpaster^{#} | SS | UNLV | Akron Racers | Never played in NPF |

==== Round 4 ====
| Pick | Player | Pos. | College | Drafted by | WPSL/NPF Experience |
|---|---|---|---|---|---|
| 13 | Brenda Iglesia^{#} | 3B/DP | Cal State Fullerton | Florida Wahoos | Never played in NPF |
| 14 | Andrea Davis^{#} | UT | Oklahoma | Tampa Bay FireStix | Never played in NPF |
| 15 | Nicole Giordano^{#} | OF | Arizona | Akron Racers | Never played in NPF |
| 16 | Toni Mascarenas | 3B | Arizona | Ohio Pride | Arizona Heat(2005–06) |

==== Round 5 ====
| Pick | Player | Pos. | College | Drafted by | WPSL/NPF Experience |
|---|---|---|---|---|---|
| 17 | Bronwyn Blair^{#} | OF | Virginia Tech | Tampa Bay FireStix | Never played in NPF |
| 18 | Janette Koshell^{#} | OF/P | Tennessee | Akron Racers | Never played in NPF |
| 19 | Lupe Brambila^{#} | OF | UCLA | Ohio Pride | Never played in NPF |
| 20 | Charla Moore^{#} | P | Texas | Florida Wahoos | Never played in NPF |

==== Round 6 ====
| Pick | Player | Pos. | College | Drafted by | WPSL/NPF Experience |
|---|---|---|---|---|---|
| 21 | Kelley Askew^{#} | C/OF | Alabama | Akron Racers | Never played in NPF |
| 22 | Stephanie Swenson^{#} | P | UCLA | Ohio Pride | Never played in NPF |
| 23 | Jamie Fuente^{#} | P | Nebraska | Florida Wahoos | Never played in NPF |
| 24 | Sarah Farnworth^{#} | P/OF | Cal State Northridge | Tampa Bay FireStix | Never played in NPF |

== Tour Rosters ==
The rosters of the 2001 WPSL All-Stars and WPSL Gold are listed below:

=== WPSL Gold ===
| # | Name | Position | College | Hometown |
|---|---|---|---|---|
| 44 | Laura Berg | OF | Fresno State | Santa Fe Springs, CA |
| 2 | Jennifer Brundage | 3B | UCLA | Ann Arbor, MI |
| 6 | Crystl Bustos | SS | Palm Beach Community College | Santa Clarita, CA |
| 22 | Sheila Douty | 1B | UCLA | Diamond Bar, CA |
| 16 | Lisa Fernandez | P/3B | UCLA | Long Beach, CA |
| 4 | Danielle Henderson | P | UMass | Commack, NY |
| 21 | Kelly Kretschman | OF | Alabama | Indian Harbour Beach, FL |
| 10 | Teri Klement-Goldberg | OF | Colorado State | Ft. Collins, CO |
| 11 | Jackie Lance | OF | New Mexico | North Delta, BC |
| 3 | Jennifer McFalls | UT INF | Texas A&M | Grand Prairie, TX |
| 32 | Michele Smith | P/1B | Oklahoma State | Califon, NJ |
| 23 | Michelle Venturella | C | Indiana | Indianapolis, IN |
| 12 | Erin White | C/OF | Iowa State | Richmond, BC |
| 7 | Cindy Yan Fang | 2B | | Beijing, China |

Head Coach: Judy Martino

=== WPSL All-Stars ===
| Name | Position | College | Hometown | Years in WPSL |
|---|---|---|---|---|
| Monica Armendarez | 3B/UT | Indiana | Carlsbad, NM | 3 |
| Patti Benedict | OF | Michigan | Lamont, FL | 3 |
| Kaci Clark | P | UCLA | Brentwood, TN | 3 |
| Danielle Cox | OF | Florida State | Anniston, AL | 2 |
| Julie Crandall | C | UNLV | San Jose, CA | 2 |
| Jaime Foutch | 1B/OF | Oklahoma State | Edmond, OK | 1 |
| Stephanie Klaviter | P | Minnesota | New Ulm, MN | 2 |
| Lyndsey Klein | SS | UCLA | Roseville, CA | 1 |
| Amy Kyler | P | Cleveland State | Marshallville, OH | 3 |
| Marty Laudato | C | Bloomsburg | Malvern, PA | 4 |
| Kim Maher | OF/UT | Fresno State | Oakland, CA | 1 |
| Kendall Richards | 3B/UT | Texas A&M | Eugene, OR | 2 |
| Julie Smith | 2B | Fresno State | Glendora, CA | 1 |
| Kellyn Tate | OF | Michigan | Chesterfield, MO | 3 |

Head Coach: Tim Kiernan

== Tour Schedule and Results ==
WPSL Gold schedule and results:

| Date | W/L | Score | Opponent | Pitcher | Location |
|---|---|---|---|---|---|
| 6/1 | W | 7-5 | WPSL All-Stars | Fernandez (1–0) | Plant City, FL |
| 6/8 | W | 8-0 | WPSL All-Stars | Fernandez (2–0) | Allentown, PA |
| 6/9 | W | 5-4 | WPSL All-Stars | Henderson (1–0) | Allentown, PA |
| 6/14 | W | 5-2 | WPSL All-Stars | Smith (1–0) | Oklahoma City, OK |
| 6/15 | W | 6-2 | WPSL All-Stars | Henderson (2–0) | Oklahoma City, OK |
| 6/17 | L | 1-2 | USA Red (Note: The USA Olympic softball team split into two teams, USA Red and USA Blue, to play a doubleheader against the two WPSL tour teams.) | Fernandez (1–2) | Los Angeles, CA |
| 6/23 | L | 2-3 | WPSL All-Stars | Henderson (2–1) | Akron, OH |
| 6/23 | L | 2-3 | WPSL All-Stars | Smith (1-1) | Akron, OH |
| 6/24 | W | 14-1 | WPSL All-Stars | Fernandez (3–1) | Akron, OH |
| 6/28 | W | 4-1 | Tennessee All-Stars | Smith (2–1) | Chattanooga, TN |
| 6/29 | T | 1-1 (Note: Called due to rain) | WPSL All-Stars | N/A | Chattanooga, TN |
| 7/1 | W | 6-5 | WPSL All-Stars | Fernandez (4–1) | Houston, TX |
| 7/2 | L | 1-2 | WPSL All-Stars | Smith (2-2) | Houston, TX |
| 7/4 | Cancelled | | WPSL All-Stars | N/A | Plant City, FL |
| 7/13 | W | 9-0 | White Sox All-Stars | Fernandez (5–1) | Rockford, IL |
| 7/14 | W | 5-0 | WPSL All-Stars | Smith (3–2) | Rockford, IL |
| 7/21 | L | 0-1 | Canada | Henderson (2-2) | Madison, WI |
| 7/22 | W | 4-0 | Canada | Fernandez (6–1) | Madison, WI |
| 7/31 | Cancelled | | WPSL All-Stars | N/A | Plant City, FL |
| 8/8 | W | 3-0 | WPSL All-Stars | Fernandez (7–1) | Salem, VA |
| 8/9 | L | 2-4 | WPSL All-Stars | Henderson (2–3) | Salem, VA |
| 8/9 | W | 2-0 | WPSL All-Stars | Fernandez (8–1) | Salem, VA |
| 8/17 | W | 6-0 | WPSL All-Stars | Fernandez (9–1) | Akron, OH |
| 8/18 | W | 3-2 | WPSL All-Stars | Smith (4–2) | Akron, OH |
| 8/18 | W | 6-3 | WPSL All-Stars | Fernandez (10–1) | Akron, OH |
| 8/29 | W | 4-0 | WPSL All-Stars | Smith (5–2) | Omaha, NE |
| 8/30 | W | 2-1 | WPSL All-Stars | Fernandez (2–1) | Omaha, NE |

WPSL All-Stars schedule and results:

| Date | W/L | Score | Opponent | Pitcher | Location |
|---|---|---|---|---|---|
| 6/1 | L | 5-7 | WPSL Gold | Klaviter (0–1) | Plant City, FL |
| 6/8 | L | 0-8 | WPSL Gold | Clark (0–1) | Allentown, PA |
| 6/9 | L | 4-5 | WPSL Gold | Kyler (0–1) | Allentown, PA |
| 6/14 | L | 2-5 | WPSL Gold | Kyler (0–2) | Oklahoma City, OK |
| 6/15 | L | 2-6 | WPSL Gold | Klaviter (0–2) | Oklahoma City, OK |
| 6/17 | W | 1-0 | USA Blue | Kyler (1–2) | Los Angeles, CA |
| 6/23 | W | 3-2 | WPSL Gold | Clark (1-1) | Akron, OH |
| 6/23 | W | 3-2 | WPSL Gold | Kyler (2-2) | Akron, OH |
| 6/24 | L | 1-14 | WPSL Gold | Klaviter (0–3) | Akron, OH |
| 6/29 | T | 1-1 | WPSL Gold | N/A | Chattanooga, TN |
| 7/1 | L | 5-6 | WPSL Gold | Kyler (2–3) | Houston, TX |
| 7/2 | W | 2-1 | WPSL Gold | Klaviter (1–3) | Houston, TX |
| 7/4 | Cancelled | | WPSL Gold | N/A | Plant City, FL |
| 7/14 | L | 0-5 | WPSL Gold | Klaviter (1–4) | Rockford, IL |
| 7/14 | W | 7-0 | White Sox All-Stars | Kyler (3-3) (Note: Perfect game) | Rockford, IL |
| 7/31 | Cancelled | | WPSL Gold | N/A | Plant City, FL |
| 8/8 | L | 0-3 | WPSL Gold | Klaviter (1–5) | Salem, VA |
| 8/9 | W | 4-2 | WPSL Gold | Kyler (4–3) | Salem, VA |
| 8/9 | L | 0-2 | WPSL Gold | Clark (1–2) | Salem, VA |
| 8/17 | L | 0-6 | WPSL Gold | Clark (1–3) | Akron, OH |
| 8/18 | L | 2-3 | WPSL Gold | Klaviter(1–6) | Akron, OH |
| 8/18 | L | 3-6 | WPSL Gold | Kyler (4-4) | Akron, OH |
| 8/29 | L | 0-4 | WPSL Gold | Kyler (4–5) | Omaha, NE |
| 8/30 | L | 1-2 | WPSL Gold | Clark (1–4) | Omaha, NE |

== See also ==
- List of professional sports leagues
- List of professional sports teams in the United States and Canada
