= 2000 Women's Pro Softball League season =

2000 WPSL Season
- League: Women's Professional Softball League
- Sport: softball
- Duration: June 19, 2000 - August 19, 2000
- Teams: 4
- TV partner: ESPN2

2000 WPSL Draft
- Top draft pick: Amanda Scott P Fresno State
- Picked by: Ohio Pride

WPSL Championship Series
- Champions: Florida Wahoos
- Runners-up: Ohio Pride
- Finals MVP: Steph Klaviter; Florida Wahoos

WPSL seasons
- 1999 2001

The 2000 Women's Professional Softball League season was the fourth season of professional women's fastpitch softball for the league named Women's Professional Softball League (WPSL). It was the WPSL's final season until the league relaunched in 2004 under the name National Pro Fastpitch. In 1997 and 1998, WPSL operated under the name Women's Pro Fastpitch (WPF).

== Teams, cities and stadiums ==
Team	City	Stadium
Akron Racers	Akron, Ohio	Firestone Stadium
Ohio Pride	Akron, Ohio	Firestone Stadium
Florida Wahoos	Plant City, FL	Plant City Stadium
Tampa Bay FireStix	Plant City, FL	Plant City Stadium

== Milestones and events ==
In October 1999, the WPSL announced a restructuring plan to consolidate the league and to facilitate a tour between the league's teams and the USA Softball Women's National Team. The plan was to take the 1999 roster of teams ( Akron Racers, Carolina Diamonds, Durham Dragons, Georgia Pride, Tampa Bay FireStix, and Virginia Roadsters) and reduce it to two teams in Ohio and two teams in Florida. The tour of exhibition games against team USA was called "From Central Park to Sydney" (the 2000 Olympics were played in Sydney, Australia) and ran from May to September.

The WPSL's two Florida teams were revealed as the Tampa Bay Firestix and Florida Wahoos, and the Ohio teams as the Akron Racers and Ohio Pride. These locations in Florida and Ohio were intended to be developed as national training centers for fastpitch softball.

On October 14, 1999 WPSL suspended operations of the Georgia Pride, Durham Dragons, Carolina Diamonds, and Virginia Roadsters. The contracted Roadsters' players were assigned to the newly created Ohio Pride of Akron, Ohio. The contracted Georgia Pride players were assigned to the expansion Florida Wahoos of Plant City, Fla. Tampa Bay FireStix relocated to Plant City Stadium in Plant City, Fla. The players of the Dragons and Diamonds became available for selection in the 2000 WPSL draft.

== Player Acquisition ==
=== Player Drafts ===
WPSL held Draft Day 2000 on December 4 at the Tradewinds Resort in St. Petersburg, FL during the National Fastpitch Coaches Association (NFCA) Convention. Three drafts were held:

- The 2000 Elite/Supplemental Draft selected players from a pool of players on the rosters of the Dragons and Diamonds, 1999 USA Softball Olympic Trial and Olympic Festival invitees who had completed their collegiate eligibility, and WPSL players who were not on their teams' protected list. The Florida Wahoos selected Fresno State shortstop Nina Lindenburg as the first elite/supplemental pick.
- The 2000 Senior Draft selected from collegiate senior fastpitch players. The Ohio Pride chose Fresno State pitcher Amanda Scott as the first senior pick.
- The 2001 National Team Draft drew from the 2000 USA Olympic roster, with the hope the players selected would play in the WPSL in 2001. (However, the WPSL suspended play before the 2001 season.) The Akron Racers selected 1996 Olympic Gold Medal-winning pitcher Lisa Fernandez as the first overall National Team pick.

== Central Park to Sydney tour ==
As part of the run-up to the 2000 Olympics in Sydney, a nine-city tour, called “Central Park to Sydney Tour,” was scheduled between WPSL teams and the USA national softball team. USA pitcher Lisa Fernandez pitched five straight perfect games, and in one of those games she struck out all 21 batters.

=== Tour schedule and results ===
DATE	TEAMS	STADIUM	LOCATION
Friday, June 2	USA Softball 1, Florida Wahoos 0	Jim Frost Stadium	Chattanooga, TN
Friday, June 9	USA Softball 1, Akron Racers 0	Firestone Stadium	Akron, OH
Sunday, June 25	USA Softball 1, Tampa Bay FireStix 0	Plant City Stadium	Plant City, FL
Saturday, July 1	USA Softball 7, Ohio Pride 0	Frank DeLuca Hall of Fame Field	Stratford, CT
Sunday, July 16	USA Softball 2, Akron Racers 1	Husky Stadium	Seattle, WA
Sunday, July 23	USA Softball 2, Florida Wahoos 0	Bulldog Diamond (renamed Margie Wright Stadium in 2014)	Fresno, CA
Thursday, July 27	USA Softball 2, Ohio Pride 0	ASA Hall of Fame Stadium	Oklahoma City, OK
Saturday, August 12	USA Softball 3, Tampa Bay FireStix 1	O'Neil Park	Bloomington, IL
Saturday, September 2	USA Softball 1, WPSL All-Stars 0	Rainbow Wahine Softball Stadium	Honolulu, HI
Sunday, September 3	USA Softball 1, WPSL All-Stars 0	Rainbow Wahine Softball Stadium	Honolulu, HI
Sunday, September 3	USA Softball 10, WPSL All-Stars 0 (ended in 6th inning due to 'mercy' rule)	Rainbow Wahine Softball Stadium	Honolulu, HI

== League standings ==
Team	GP	W	L	Pct.	GB
Florida Wahoos	32	24	8	.750	-
Ohio Pride	32	16	16	.500	8
Akron Racers	32	15	17	.469	9
Tampa Bay FireStix	32	9	23	.281	13

== WPSL Championship ==
The 2000 WPSL Championship Series was held at Meador Park in Springfield, Mo on August 25 and 26. The top two WPSL teams met in a best-of-three series to determine the champion.

2000 WPSL Championship Series Florida Wahoos defeat Ohio Pride 2–0
Game	Date	Score	Series (FL–OH)
1	August 25	Florida Wahoos 3, Ohio Pride 0	1–0
2	August 26	Florida Wahoos 1, Ohio Pride 0	2–0

2000 NPF Championship Series MVP
Player	Club
Steph Klaviter	Florida Wahoos

== Statistical leaders ==
WOMEN'S PRO SOFTBALL LEAGUE LEADERS (THROUGH GAMES OF 8/19/00)

BATTING TOP 10 (MINIMUM 76 PLATE APPEARANCES)

BATTER	TEAM	AVG	G	AB	R	H	HR	RBI
Patti Benedict	Florida Wahoos	.330	31	106	11	35	1	7
Nina Lindenberg	Florida Wahoos	.311	32	90	12	28	3	6
Julie Smith	Ohio Pride	.289	30	97	10	28	0	4
Jamie Foutch	Ohio Pride	.284	32	95	12	27	5	13
Danielle Cox	Akron Racers	.275	29	69	11	19	0	2
Kellyn Tate	Akron Racers	.274	30	84	8	23	1	6
Julie Crandall	Florida Wahoos	.238	29	80	3	19	0	3
Kim Maher	Florida Wahoos	.217	30	92	7	20	1	10
Dana Degan	Ohio Pride	.216	26	74	5	16	1	4
Kendall Richards	Florida Wahoos	.214	29	84	9	18	0	8

HOME RUNS

PLAYER	TEAM	HR
Jamie Foutch	Ohio Pride	5
Marty Laudato	Tampa Bay FireStix	4
Nina Lindenberg	Florida Wahoos	3
Several Players Tied at 2

RBI

PLAYER	TEAM	RBI
Jamie Foutch	Ohio Pride	13
Soia Maumausolo	Florida Wahoos	11
Kim Maher	Florida Wahoos	10
Julie Adams	Ohio Pride	9
Marty Laudato	Tampa Bay FireStix	9

STOLEN BASES

PLAYER	TEAM	SB
Danielle Cox	Akron Racers	9
Traci Conrad	Akron Racers	7
Julie Smith	Ohio Pride	7
Barbara Jordan	Tampa Bay FireStix	6
Several Players Tied at 5

TEAM BATTING

TEAM	AVG	AB	R	H	HR	BB	SO	SB	CS
Florida Wahoos	.209	847	68	177	8	51	111	16	7
Ohio Pride	.196	838	65	164	11	44	165	23	8
Akron Racers	.180	821	53	148	7	47	226	35	14
Tampa Bay FireStix	.139	779	36	108	8	63	187	16	9

TEAM PITCHING

TEAM	W	L	ERA	H	CG	SHO	SV	HR	BB	SO
Florida Wahoos	24	8	0.85	131	28	15	0	6	52	212
Akron Racers	15	17	0.99	158	18	6	3	13	60	149
Ohio Pride	16	16	1.32	141	21	8	3	7	56	203
Tampa Bay FireStix	9	23	1.50	167	25	3	0	8	37	125

PITCHING TOP 10 (MINIMUM 32 IP)

PITCHER	TEAM	W-L	ERA	IP	H	BB	SO
Steph Klaviter	Florida Wahoos	10- 2	0.25	84	31	11	68
Amy Kyler	Akron Racers	3- 5	0.83	68	43	22	60
Liza Brown	Akron Racers	3- 3	0.89	47	27	11	29
Sarah Dawson	Akron Racers	6- 5	0.92	76	49	15	41
Kaci Clark	Florida Wahoos	8- 3	0.94	82	46	27	77
Brandee McArthur	Ohio Pride	6- 7	0.98	107	69	17	87
Monica Triner	Tampa Bay FireStix	3-10	1.09	96	74	9	44
Heather Compton	Ohio Pride	7- 3	1.34	68	35	24	81
Desarie Knipfer	Florida Wahoos	6- 3	1.44	73	54	14	67
Carla Brookbank	Akron Racers	3- 4	1.44	49	39	12	19

WINS

PITCHER	TEAM	W
Steph Klaviter	Florida Wahoos	10
Kaci Clark	Florida Wahoos	8
Heather Compton	Ohio Pride	7
Several Players Tied at 6

SAVES

PITCHER	TEAM	SV
Liza Brown	Akron Racers	2
Carla Brookbank	Akron Racers	1
Heather Compton	Ohio Pride	1
Holly Killion	Ohio Pride	1
Brandee McArthur	Ohio Pride	1

STRIKEOUTS

PITCHER	TEAM	SO
Brandee McArthur	Ohio Pride	87
Heather Compton	Ohio Pride	81
Kaci Clark	Florida Wahoos	77
Steph Klaviter	Florida Wahoos	68
Desarie Knipfer	Florida Wahoos	67

== Annual awards ==
Award	Player	Team	Note
Most Valuable Player	Patti Benedict	Florida Wahoos	
Hitter of the Year	Patti Benedict	Florida Wahoos	
Home Run Champion	Jaime Foutch	Ohio Pride	5 HR
Pitcher of the Year	Steph Klaviter	Florida Wahoos	league leader in wins and ERA
Defensive Player of the Year	Julie Smith	Ohio Pride	only committed two errors
Coach of the Year	Cindy Bristow	Florida Wahoos	regular-season record of 24-8 (.750), berth in the 2000 WPSL Championship Series.

== WPSL All-Star Team ==
2000 WPSL All-Star Team roster

2000 WPSL ALL-STAR ROSTER
Player	Position	WPSL Team	College	Hometown
Julie Adams	3B	Ohio Pride	UCLA	Cypress, CA
Patti Benedict	OF	Florida Wahoos	Michigan	Lamont, FL
Heather Compton	P	Ohio Pride	UCLA	Santa Maria, CA
Danielle Cox	OF	Akron Racers	Florida State	Anniston, AL
Julie Crandall	C	Florida Wahoos	UNLV	San Jose, CA
Dana Degen	DP	Ohio Pride	Hawaii	La Mesa, CA
Jaime Foutch	OF/1B	Ohio Pride	Oklahoma State	Edmond, OK
Barbara Jordan	OF	Tampa Bay FireStix	CSNU	Granada Hills, CA
Steph Klaviter	P	Florida Wahoos	Minnesota	New Ulm, MN
Desarie Knipfer	P	Florida Wahoos	CP - SLO	Scotts Valley, CA
Amy Kyler	P	Akron Racers	Cleveland State	Marshallville, OH
Nina Lindenberg	SS	Florida Wahoos	Fresno State	Anaheim, CA
Kim Maher	OF	Florida Wahoos	Fresno State	Oakland, CA
Kendall Richards	3B	Florida Wahoos	Texas A&M	Eugene, OR
Julie Smith	2B	Ohio Pride	Fresno State	Glendora, CA
Kellyn Tate	OF	Akron Racers	Michigan	Chesterfield, MO

Head Coach: Cindy Bristow, Florida Wahoos

The USA Olympic softball team played a doubleheader against each NPF All-Star Team on July 13. The Olympians swept the games beating the East 5-0, and edging the West 5-3 in 9 innings. The West All-Stars beat the East by a score of 1-0 on July 14. Nancy Evans was named the Most Valuable Player.

== See also ==
- List of professional sports leagues
- List of professional sports teams in the United States and Canada
