= 1999 Women's Pro Softball League season =

1999 WPSL Season
- League: Women's Professional Softball League
- Sport: softball
- Duration: May 13, 1999 - August 22, 1999
- Teams: 6
- TV partner: ESPN2

1999 WPSL Draft
- Top draft pick: Isonette Polonius 3B; East Carolina
- Picked by: Durham Dragons

Regular Season
- Regular Season Champions: Tampa Bay FireStix
- WPSL Champions: Tampa Bay FireStix
- Runners-up: Akron Racers
- Season MVP: Kaci Clark; Virginia Roadsters

WPSL Championship
- Finals MVP: Pat Dufficy; Tampa Bay FireStix

WPSL seasons
- 1998 2000

The 1999 Women's Professional Softball League season was the third season of professional fastpitch softball for the league named Women's Professional Softball League (WPSL). In 1997 and 1998, WPSL operated under the name Women's Pro Fastpitch (WPF).

== Milestones and Events ==
After the 1998 season, the WPF (Women's Pro Fastpitch) changed its name to Women's Professional Softball League season (WPSL). WPSL Commissioner/CEO John Carroll said the change should improve the league's name recognition, as "The term 'softball' is more readily recognized by our mass audience than the term 'fastpitch'," Carroll said. "We believe the name change will result in higher public recognition. It will allow people to identify with the sport we play, rather than our style of play." Also, two-time WPF Champion Orlando Wahoos folded, and their roster was assigned to the expansion Akron Racers.

On December 22, Centenary College of Shreveport, LA softball coach Michael Bastian was hired as the full-time head coach of the Racers.
The other full-time WPSL coaches were Willie Rucker for the Carolina Diamonds, Judy Martino for the Durham Dragons, Cindy Bristow for the Georgia Pride, Linda Derk for the Tampa Bay FireStix, and Terri Pearson for the Virginia Roadsters.

On March 23, the Durham Dragons introduced Bill Miller as general manager, replacing Dena Lambert.

The WPSL cancelled all preseason games, citing that many draft picks and free agents would be participating in the Women's College World Series.

On July 16, Georgia's Desarie Knipfer pitched the second perfect game in WPSL history, beating the Dragons 6-0.

== Teams, cities and stadiums ==
Team	City	Stadium
Akron Racers	Akron, Ohio	Firestone Stadium
Carolina Diamonds	Gastonia, North Carolina	Sims Legion Park
Durham Dragons	Durham, North Carolina	Durham Athletic Park
Georgia Pride	Columbus, Georgia	South Commons Softball Complex
Tampa Bay FireStix	Tampa, Florida	Red McEwen Field
Virginia Roadsters	Hampton, Virginia	War Memorial Stadium

== Player Acquisition ==
=== College Draft ===
On December 5, 1998 the 1999 WPSL Senior Draft was held in St. Petersburg, Fla. The Durham Dragons selected 3B Isonette Polonius of East Carolina University with the first pick.

== League standings ==
Team	W	L	Pct.	GB
Tampa Bay FireStix	37	29	.561	-
Akron Racers	34	32	.515	3
Virginia Roadsters	34	32	.515	3
Georgia Pride	33	33	.500	4
Carolina Diamonds	32	34	.485	5
Durham Dragons	28	38	.424	9

== WPSL Championship ==
The 1999 WPSL Championship Series was held at Firestone Stadium in Akron, Ohio August 24-8. The top three teams on the standings qualified. The second- and third-place teams, the Racers and Roadsters, played a best-of-three semifinal series. The semifinal winner, the Racers, played the first-place team, the FireStix, in a best-of-three final series.

WPSL Semifinals (Best of 3)			WPSL Championship (Best of 3)
			1	Tampa Bay FireStix	2
2	Virginia Roadsters	0	3	Akron Racers	0
3	Akron Racers	2

1999 WPSL Semifinals Akron Racers defeat Virginia Roadsters 2–0
Game	Date	Score	Series (AK-VA)	Location
1	August 24	Akron Racers 1, Virginia Roadsters 0	1–0	Akron, Ohio
2	August 25	Akron Racers 4, Virginia Roadsters 1	2-0	Akron, Ohio

1999 WPSL Championship Tampa Bay FireStix defeat Akron Racers 2–0
Game	Date	Score	Series (TB-AK)	Location
1	August 27	Tampa Bay FireStix 3, Akron Racers 2, (12 innings)	1–0	Akron, Ohio
2	August 28	Tampa Bay FireStix 2, Akron Racers 1	2-0	Akron, Ohio

1999 WPSL Championship Series Most Valuable Player
Player	Club
Pat Dufficy	Tampa Bay FireStix

== Annual awards ==
Regular season champions
Tampa Bay FireStix

Award	Player	Team	
Most Valuable Player	Kaci Clark	Virginia Roadsters	
Pitcher of the Year	Kaci Clark	Virginia Roadsters	23-8, 1.51 ERA, 168 Ks
Hitter of the Year	Marty Laudato	Tampa Bay FireStix	.311 BA, 8 HRs, 36 RBIs
Defensive Player of the Year	Randi Berg	Georgia Pride	.966 fielding %, 92 assists, 137 putouts, 237 total chances, 19 double plays
Home Run Champion	Monica Armendarez	Carolina Diamonds	12 HR (WPSL record)
Coach of the Year	Linda Derk	Tampa Bay FireStix	

== 1999 WPSL All-Star Game ==
The 1999 WPSL All-Star Game was played on June 13 in Plant City, FL at Plant City Stadium, televised on July 29 later on ESPN2. The game feature 30 players split between two teams, one called the "WPSL Stars" and the other "WPSL Stripes." The Stars included players from the Akron Racers, Durham Dragons and Virginia Roadsters, and the Stripes were made up of Carolina Diamonds, Georgia Pride and Tampa Bay FireStix.

The WPSL Stars beat the WPSL Stripes by a score of a 5-4. Roadsters catcher Scia Maumausolo hit a game-winning home run in the eighth inning and was named the game's Most Valuable Player.

Following are the All-Star rosters:

1999 WPSL STARS All-STARS
Player	WPSL Team	Position
VOTED STARTERS
Carla Brookbank	Akron Racers	1B
Crystl Bustos	Akron Racers	SS
Traci Conrad	Akron Racers	OF
Tobin Echo-Hawk	Akron Racers	2B
Tamara Ivie	Virginia Roadsters	OF
Amy Kyler	Akron Racers	P
Stephanie Little	Durham Dragons	C
Nicole Odom	Akron Racers	3B
Jen Smith	Durham Dragons	DP
Kellyn Tate	Akron Racers	OF
RESERVES
Kaci Clark	Virginia Roadsters	P
Michele Hawkins	Durham Dragons	P
Scia Maumausolo	Virginia Roadsters	C
Patti Raduenz	Durham Dragons	SS
Cheri Shinn	Virginia Roadsters	OF
COACHES
Michael Bastian	Akron Racers	All-Star Head Coach
Judy Martino	Durham Dragons	All-Star Assistant Coach
Terri Pearson	Virginia Roadsters	All-Star Assistant Coach

1999 WPSL STRIPES ALL-STARS
Player	WPSL Team	Position
VOTED STARTERS
Monica Armendarez	Carolina Diamonds	3B
Patti Benedict	Georgia Pride	OF
Crystal Boyd	Georgia Pride	SS
Danielle Cox	Georgia Pride	OF
Marty Laudato	Tampa Bay Firestix	C
Sara Graziano	Tampa Bay FireStix	DP
Michelle Hubler	Tampa Bay FireStix	2B
Victoria Huff	Carolina Diamonds	1B
Venus Taylor	Tampa Bay FireStix	OF
DeeDee Weiman-Garcia	Tampa Bay FireStix	P
RESERVES
Karen Jackson	Carolina Diamonds	P
Julie Crandall	Georgia Pride	C
Brandee McArthur	Carolina Diamonds	P
Christine Parris-Washington	Tampa Bay FireStix	3B
Gina Perez	Tampa Bay FireStix	OF
COACHES
Linda Derk	Tampa Bay FireStix	All-Star Head Coach
Willie Rucker	Carolina Diamonds	All-Star Assistant Coach
Cindy Bristow	Georgia Pride	All-Star Assistant Coach

== Statistical leaders ==
=== Batting ===
BATTING TOP 10 (MINIMUM 158 PLATE APPEARANCES)

BATTER	CLUB	AVG	G	AB	R	H	HR	RBI
Kellyn Tate	Akron Racers	.320	60	175	32	56	4	28
Marty Laudato	Tampa Bay FireStix	.311	60	177	23	55	8	36
Patti Benedict	Georgia Pride	.304	66	237	29	72	0	21
Scia Maumausolo	Virginia Roadsters	.302	61	182	16	55	8	42
Traci Conrad	Akron Racers	.291	58	206	28	60	0	14
Ali Viola	Tampa Bay FireStix	.287	57	178	26	51	6	28
Monica Armendarez	Carolina Diamonds	.286	66	185	28	53	12	35
Danielle Cox	Georgia Pride	.286	57	182	21	52	0	9
Venus Taylor	Tampa Bay FireStix	.282	60	202	29	57	1	16
Priscilla Welch	Virginia Roadsters	.282	66	195	20	55	0	13

HOME RUNS

BATTER	CLUB	HR
Monica Armendarez	Carolina Diamonds	12
Marty Laudato	Tampa Bay FireStix	8
Andrea D'Innocenzo	Carolina Diamonds	8
Scia Maumausolo	Virginia Roadsters	8
Several Players Tied at 7

RBI

BATTER	CLUB	RBI
Scia Maumausolo	Virginia Roadsters	42
Marty Laudato	Tampa Bay FireStix	36
Andrea D'Innocenzo	Carolina Diamonds	36
Monica Armendarez	Carolina Diamonds	35
Jen Smith	Durham Dragons	30

STOLEN BASES

BATTER	CLUB	SB
Dawn Wuthrich	Carolina Diamonds	26
Jen Buford	Carolina Diamonds	21
Venus Taylor	Tampa Bay FireStix	14
Traci Conrad	Akron Racers	14
Several Players Tied at 13

TEAM BATTING

CLUB	AVG	AB	R	H	HR	BB	SO	SB	CS
Tampa Bay FireStix	.253	1770	231	447	29	208	231	36	21
Akron Racers	.244	1794	242	437	33	206	271	68	36
Georgia Pride	.244	1849	186	451	15	153	212	51	27
Virginia Roadsters	.243	1772	210	430	21	166	237	73	21
Carolina Diamonds	.234	1826	193	427	26	150	250	93	26
Durham Dragons	.227	1808	178	411	18	123	233	34	16

HITS

BATTER	CLUB	H
Patti Benedict	Georgia Pride	72
Traci Conrad	Akron Racers	60
Dawn Wuthrich	Carolina Diamonds	59
Venus Taylor	Tampa Bay FireStix	57
Andrea D'Innocenzo	Carolina Diamonds	57

DOUBLES

BATTER	CLUB	2B
Kellyn Tate	Akron Racers	11
Patti Benedict	Georgia Pride	11
Ali Viola	Tampa Bay FireStix	9
Kendall Richards	Georgia Pride	9
Several Players Tied at 8

TRIPLES

BATTER	CLUB	3B
Sarah Fredstrom	Virginia Roadsters	5
Jen Buford	Carolina Diamonds	4
Several Players Tied at 3

ON-BASE PERCENTAGE

BATTER	CLUB	OBP
Nancy Evans	Tampa Bay FireStix	.439
Monica Armendarez	Carolina Diamonds	.432
Kellyn Tate	Akron Racers	.420
Scia Maumausolo	Virginia Roadsters	.402
Cheri Shinn	Virginia Roadsters	.387

SLUGGING PERCENTAGE

BATTER	CLUB	SLG
Monica Armendarez	Carolina Diamonds	.541
Scia Maumausolo	Virginia Roadsters	.489
Kellyn Tate	Akron Racers	.486
Marty Laudato	Tampa Bay FireStix	.480
Liza Brown	Akron Racers	.459

EXTRA-BASE HITS

BATTER	CLUB	XBH
Monica Armendarez	Carolina Diamonds	21
Sarah Fredstrom	Virginia Roadsters	19
Kellyn Tate	Akron Racers	18
Scia Maumausolo	Virginia Roadsters	17
Several Players Tied at 15

RUNS SCORED

BATTER	CLUB	R
Sarah Fredstrom	Virginia Roadsters	34
Cheri Shinn	Virginia Roadsters	33
Kellyn Tate	Akron Racers	32
Several Players Tied at 29

=== Pitching ===
PITCHING TOP 10 (MINIMUM 66 IP)

PITCHER	CLUB	W-L	ERA	IP	H	BB	SO
Steph Klaviter	Georgia Pride	5- 9	0.85	107	82	33	49
Kaci Clark	Virginia Roadsters	23- 8	1.51	231	174	89	168
Desarie Knipfer	Georgia Pride	15-11	1.66	190	139	51	147
Brandee McArthur	Carolina Diamonds	16-11	1.72	191	150	76	80
Monica Triner	Tampa Bay FireStix	10- 7	1.74	133	119	25	51
Sarah Dawson	Akron Racers	13- 8	1.91	143	120	42	88
Amy Kyler	Akron Racers	7- 7	1.97	110	80	47	59
Trinity Johnson	Durham Dragons	8- 6	1.97	96	78	32	58
Heather Compton	Tampa Bay FireStix	10-11	1.99	127	104	39	80
Dee Dee Weiman-Garcia	Tampa Bay FireStix	16- 9	2.01	188	169	53	123

WINS

PITCHER	CLUB	W
Kaci Clark	Virginia Roadsters	23
Dee Dee Weiman-Garcia	Tampa Bay FireStix	16
Brandee McArthur	Carolina Diamonds	16
Desarie Knipfer	Georgia Pride	15
Karen Jackson	Carolina Diamonds	14

SAVES

PITCHER	CLUB	S
Sarah Dawson	Akron Racers	3
Desarie Knipfer	Georgia Pride	2
Several Players Tied at 1

STRIKEOUTS

PITCHER	CLUB	K
Kaci Clark	Virginia Roadsters	168
Desarie Knipfer	Georgia Pride	147
Dee Dee Weiman-Garcia	Tampa Bay FireStix	123
Michele Hawkins	Durham Dragons	97
Sarah Dawson	Akron Racers	88

TEAM PITCHING

CLUB	W-L	ERA	H	CG	SHO	SV	HR	BB	SO
Georgia Pride	33- 33	1.64	449	40	13	3	27	146	273
Tampa Bay FireStix	37- 29	2.03	415	51	8	2	24	126	262
Akron Racers	34- 32	2.19	411	43	7	5	20	168	225
Carolina Diamonds	32- 34	2.48	440	43	5	1	19	208	172
Virginia Roadsters	34- 32	2.55	430	38	10	0	21	189	255
Durham Dragon	28- 38	2.63	458	45	5	1	31	169	247

GAMES

PITCHER	CLUB	G
Kaci Clark	Virginia Roadsters	38
Karen Jackson	Carolina Diamonds	35
Michele Hawkins	Durham Dragons	33
Desarie Knipfer	Georgia Pride	32
Several Players Tied at 29

COMPLETE GAMES

PITCHER	CLUB	CG
Kaci Clark	Virginia Roadsters	26
Dee Dee Weiman-Garcia	Tampa Bay FireStix	22
Karen Jackson	Carolina Diamonds	20
Brandee McArthur	Carolina Diamonds	20
Michele Hawkins	Durham Dragons	18

SHUTOUTS

PITCHER	CLUB	SO
Kaci Clark	Virginia Roadsters	7
Sarah Dawson	Akron Racers	5
Karen Jackson	Carolina Diamonds	4
Several Players Tied at 3

INNINGS PITCHED

PITCHER	CLUB	IP
Kaci Clark	Virginia Roadsters	231.1
Karen Jackson	Carolina Diamonds	203.1
Brandee McArthur	Carolina Diamonds	191.1
Desarie Knipfer	Georgia Pride	190.0
Dee Dee Weiman-Garcia	Tampa Bay FireStix	188.0

LOSSES

PITCHER	CLUB	L
Michele Hawkins	Durham Dragons	15
Amie Stewart	Durham Dragons	13
Several Players Tied at 11

WALKS

PITCHER	CLUB	BB
Kaci Clark	Virginia Roadsters	89
Karen Jackson	Carolina Diamonds	88
Brandee McArthur	Carolina Diamonds	76
Amie Stewart	Durham Dragons	68
Several Players Tied at 53

HOME RUNS ALLOWED

PITCHER	CLUB	HR
Michele Hawkins	Durham Dragons	14
Desarie Knipfer	Georgia Pride	12
Karen Jackson	Carolina Diamonds	11
Amie Stewart	Durham Dragons	11
Several Players Tied at 7

== See also ==
- List of professional sports leagues
- List of professional sports teams in the United States and Canada
