= Colorado Altitude (2004 NPF team) =

American women's softball team

- [[File: |frameless|class=pageimage|alt=]] Logo

Information
- League: National Pro Fastpitch
- Location: Littleton, CO
- Ballpark: All City Stadium
- Founded: 2004
- Ownership: Danny Stroud
- Manager: Sharron Backus

The Colorado Altitude were a women's professional softball team based in Littleton, Colorado. They were part of the founding roster of National Pro Fastpitch teams in 2004.

== History ==
During the NPF's 2003 All-Star tour, the league announced the addition of a team in the Denver, Colorado area. The owners were Danny Stroud and Claud York. The team was named the Colorado Altitude and expected to play at All City Stadium in Denver. Long-time UCLA softball coach and WPF Orlando Wahoos coach Sharron Backus was to be the coach of the Altitude.

The Altitude were assigned to the NPF's West Division, along with the San Antonio Armadillos, Arizona Heat, and California Sunbirds. The East Division included NY/NJ Juggernaut, New England Riptide, Akron Racers and Texas Thunder.

In March 2004, NPF released its inaugural schedule for the year and did not include the Armadillos and the Altitude. The Altitude announced that it was their decision not to join the league in 2004, citing various concerns and leaving open the possibility of considering playing in NPF in 2005. However, the only 2005 expansion team was the Chicago Bandits, and NPF has yet to add a full-time member in Colorado.

== Players ==
The Altitude participated in NPF's inaugural Elite Draft and Senior Draft. The following players were drafted by Colorado:

Player	Position	College	Draft Position	NPF Experience
Lindsey Gardner	2B	Texas	Elite Draft: Round 1, Pick 5	Texas/Rockford Thunder (2004–08)
Randi Berg	2B	Fresno State	Elite Draft: Round 2, Pick 13 - Released	Georgia Pride (1999), Florida Wahoos (2000)
Nikki Bowey	OF	Mercer	Elite Draft: Round 3 Pick 21	Never played in NPF
Rachel Gensch	CF	Bradley	Elite Draft: Round 4, Pick 29 - Released	Never played in NPF
Phelan Wright	3B	Arizona State	Senior Draft: Round 1, Pick 4	Arizona Heat (2005)
Nicole Barber	OF	Georgia	Senior Draft: Round 2, Pick 12	Washington Glory (2007–08)
Nicole Trimboli	OF	Nebraska	Senior Draft: Round 3, Pick 20	Akron Racers (2004–05), Chicago Bandits (2006–09), USSSA Pride (2010–11), Akron Racers (2011-12)
Kristin Farber	P	Arizona State	Senior Draft: Round 4, Pick 28	Never played in NPF
Ricki Walker	UT	Colorado State	Senior Draft Round 5, Pick 36	Never played in NPF
Meghann Reiss	1B	Wisconsin	Senior Draft: Round 6, Pick 44 - Released	Never played in NPF
