= San Antonio Armadillos (2004 NPF team) =

Softball team in San Antonio, Texas

- Logo

Information
- League: National Pro Fastpitch
- Location: San Antonio, Texas
- Ballpark: SAISD Spring Sports Complex
- Founded: 2004
- Ownership: Suzi Stauffer; Carlton Caudle
- Manager: Phil Koehler

The San Antonio Armadillos were a women's professional softball team based in San Antonio, Texas. They were part of the founding roster of National Pro Fastpitch teams in 2004.

== History ==
The Armadillos's owner was Suzi Stauffer. The Armadillos were assigned to the NPF's West Division, along with the Colorado Altitude, Arizona Heat, and California Sunbirds. The East Division included NY/NJ Juggernaut, New England Riptide, Akron Racers and Texas Thunder.

The team announced in February that they had an agreement to lease San Antonio Independent School District's Spring Sports Complex for their games.

Veteran softball coach Phil Koehler was named the Armadillos' coach, to be assisted by Charles Dismuke of the San Antonio Fastpitch Academy and former Texas A&M softball player Gina Perez. By 2015, Koehler had more than 35 years of softball coaching, including 1989-96 as head coach of St. Edward's University

In March 2004, NPF released its inaugural schedule for the year and did not include the Armadillos and the Altitude. Sources reported that NPF felt the San Antonio ownership ""came in late and really just couldn't get everything together in time," while Stauffer, calling the process a "nightmare," claimed she had a stadium and sponsors signed up, but NPF doubted her ability to support the team and increased her fee substantially, on top of a dispute over whether the league owned the team name and logos.

Shortly thereafter, a letter of the team's website indicated that the Armadillos, with new owners, would apply to be an NPF expansion team in 2005. However, the only 2005 expansion team was the Chicago Bandits, and after the Texas Thunder moved to Rockford, Illinois, the NPF would not have a team in Texas until the Dallas Charge began play in 2015.

== Players ==
The Armadillos participated in NPF's inaugural Elite Draft and Senior Draft. The following players were drafted by the Armadillos:

Player	Position	College	Draft Position	NPF Experience
Stacey Phillips	1B	Michigan State	Elite Draft: Round 1, pick 1 - Signed	Never played in NPF
Kathy Morton	OF	Southwestern Louisiana	Elite Draft: Round 1, pick 7 - Signed	Never played in NPF
Lea Mishlan	SS	South Florida	Elite Draft: Round 2, Pick 9	Never played in NPF
Stormy Hanson	C	Indiana	Elite Draft: Round 3, Pick 17	Never played in NPF
Jessica Wheeler	SS	San Jacinto College	Elite Draft: Round 4, Pick 25	Never played in NPF
Carri Leto	IF	Northwestern	Senior Draft: Round 2, Pick 16	NY/NJ Juggernaut (2004–05), Philadelphia Force (2006), New England Riptide (2007–08)
Tara Knudsen	SS	Georgia Tech	Senior Draft: Round 3, Pick 24	Arizona Heat (2005)
LaDonia Hughes	OF	LSU	Senior Draft: Round 4, Pick 32	Arizona Heat (2005–06), Washington Glory (2007–08), USSSA Pride (2009)
Anissa Meashintubby	P	Oregon	Senior Draft: Round 5, Pick 40	Never played in NPF
Meghan Clark	1B	Mercer	Senior Draft: Round 6, Pick 48	Never played in NPF

The following players also appeared on the team's roster, acquired via means other the draft (free agency, trade):

Player	Position	College	NPF Experience
Robyn King	2B	Boston University	Never played in NPF
Tobin Echo-Hawk	3B	Nebraska	Orlando Wahoos (1997–98), Akron Racers (1999-00, 2005)
Becky Manson	UT	Central Michigan	Never played in NPF
Alicia Smith	OF	Hofstra	NY/NJ Juggernaut (2005)
Monica Triner	P	South Florida	Tampa Bay FireStix (1999-00), Arizona Heat (2004)
Tarrah Beyster	P	Oregon State University	NPF All-Stars (2003), Arizona Heat (2004), New England Riptide (2006–07)
