= 2005 NPF Draft =

2005 Senior College Player Selections

General information
- Sport: softball
- Date: February 7, 2005

Overview
- 24 (3 were passed) total selections
- League: National Pro Fastpitch
- Teams: 6
- First selection: Amy Harre P Southern Illinois selected by Chicago Bandits
- Most selections: Chicago Bandits, New England Riptide, NY/NJ Juggernaut, Akron Racers, Texas Thunder; 4 picks each
- Fewest selections: Arizona Heat, 1 pick (and 3 passes)

The 2005 Senior College Player Selections was the second annual NPF player draft. It was held February 7, 2005 to assign division I college players to pro teams for 2005 season. The first selection was Southern Illinois' Amy Harre, picked by the expansion Chicago Bandits. Athletes are not allowed by the NCAA to sign professional contracts until their collegiate seasons have ended. The Arizona Heat made their selection in round 1, but passed on all their subsequent selections. NPF teams' exclusive rights to players selected in the 2005 draft expired July 15, 2005.

== 2005 Senior College Player Selections ==
Following are the 24 selections from the 2005 NPF Senior Draft:

Position key:
C = Catcher; UT = Utility infielder; INF = Infielder; 1B = First base; 2B =Second base SS = Shortstop; 3B = Third base; OF = Outfielder; RF = Right field; CF = Center field; LF = Left field; P = Pitcher; RHP = right-handed Pitcher; LHP = left-handed Pitcher; DP =Designated player
Positions are listed as combined for those who can play multiple positions.

^{+}	Denotes player who has been selected to at least one All-NPF team
^{#}	Denotes player who has not played in the NPF

=== Round 1 ===
Pick	Player	Pos.	NPF Team	College
1	Amy Harre^{+}	P	Chicago Bandits	Southern Illinois
2	Jackie Coburn	C/3B	Arizona Heat	Arizona
3	Jessica Merchant^{+}	SS	New England Riptide	Michigan
4	Heather Scaglione	C	NY/NJ Juggernaut	Oklahoma
5	Jamie Southern^{+}	P	Akron Racers	Fresno State
6	Kristen Rivera^{#}	C	Texas Thunder	Washington

=== Round 2 ===
Pick	Player	Pos.	NPF Team	College
7	Megan Ciolli	OF	Chicago Bandits	Notre Dame
8	Arizona Heat passed
9	Ashley Courtney^{+}	OF/C	New England Riptide	Alabama
10	Jessica Sallinger	P	NY/NJ Juggernaut	Georgia Tech
11	Kami Keiter^{#}	P	Akron Racers	Oklahoma
12	Brooke Mitchell^{#}	P	Texas Thunder	Louisiana-Lafayette

=== Round 3 ===
Pick	Player	Pos.	NPF Team	College
13	Christina Enea	1B	Chicago Bandits	Oklahoma
14	Arizona Heat passed
15	Kim Wendland^{#}	IF	New England Riptide	Georgia
16	Kaleo Eldredge	OF	NY/NJ Juggernaut	California
17	Ani Nyhus^{#}	P	Akron Racers	Oregon
18	Adrian Gregory	SS	Texas Thunder	Texas A&M

=== Round 4 ===
Pick	Player	Pos.	NPF Team	College
19	Anne Steffan^{+}	IF	Chicago Bandits	Nebraska
20	Arizona Heat passed
21	Stephanie Best	SS	New England Riptide	Central Florida
22	Chelsea Spencer^{+}	SS	NY/NJ Juggernaut	California
23	Oli Keohohou^{+}	IF	Akron Racers	Long Beach State
24	Nicole Robinson^{#}	C	Texas Thunder	Texas A&M
