= 2004 NPF Draft =

2004 Elite Draft

General information
- Sport: softball
- Date: December 6, 2003
- Location: Montgomery, TX

Overview
- 32 total selections
- League: National Pro Fastpitch
- Teams: 8
- First selection: Stacey Phillips 1B Michigan State selected by San Antonio Armadillos
- Most selections: San Antonio Armadillos 5 picks
- Fewest selections: New England Riptide 3 picks

2004 College Senior Draft

General information
- Sport: softball
- Date: December 6, 2003
- Location: Montgomery, TX

Overview
- 48 total selections
- League: National Pro Fastpitch
- Teams: 8
- First selection: Iyhia McMichael OF Southern Illinois selected by Akron Racers
- Most selections: New England Riptide 7 picks
- Fewest selections: San Antonio Armadillos 5 picks

2004 NPF Supplemental Draft

General information
- Sport: softball
- Date: March 30, 2004

Overview
- 17 total selections
- League: National Pro Fastpitch
- Teams: 6
- First selection: Tara Knudsen SS Georgia Tech selected by New England Riptide
- Most selections: NY/NJ Juggernaut, Arizona Heat; 4 picks each
- Fewest selections: California Sunbirds 1 pick

The 2004 NPF Draft denotes a series of player drafts as a part of the launch of the NPF inaugural season. On December 6, 2003 in conjunction with the National Fastpitch Coaches Association National Convention at the Del Lago Resort in Montgomery, Texas the eight original NPF teams (Akron, Arizona, Colorado, New England, New York/New Jersey, Sacramento, San Antonio, and Texas ) selected players in two drafts: a four-round Elite Draft that selected players who had completed their college eligibility and a six-round College Senior Draft which selected players in their final year of college. Athletes are not allowed by the NCAA to sign professional contracts until their collegiate seasons have ended.

After the decision was made to launch the 2004 season without the Colorado Altitude and San Antonio Armadillos, a Supplemental Draft was held to allocate players whose rights were held by Colorado and San Antonio.

San Antonio selected Michigan State 1B, and Indiana assistant coach Stacey Phillips with the first overall selection in the Elite Draft. In the College Senior Draft Iyhia McMichael of Mississippi State was selected first by the Akron Racers. For the first pick of the Supplemental Draft, New England chose Georgia Tech's Tara Knudsen whose rights were previously held by San Antonio.

== 2004 NPF Draft ==
Position key:
C = Catcher; UT = Utility infielder; INF = Infielder; 1B = First base; 2B =Second base SS = Shortstop; 3B = Third base; OF = Outfielder; RF = Right field; CF = Center field; LF = Left field; P = Pitcher; RHP = right-handed Pitcher; LHP = left-handed Pitcher; DP =Designated player
Positions are listed as combined for those who can play multiple positions.

^{+}	Denotes player who has been selected to at least one All-NPF team
^{#}	Denotes player who has not played in the NPF

=== Elite Draft ===
Following are the 32 selections from the 2004 NPF Elite Draft:

==== Round 1 ====
Pick	Player	Pos.	NPF Team	College
1	Stacey Phillips^{#}	1B	San Antonio Armadillos	Michigan State
2	Lindsay Chouinard^{+}	P	Texas Thunder	DePaul
3	Brenda DeBlaes^{#}	SS	Sacramento Sunbirds	Belgium
4	Liz Bouck-Jagielski	2B	Arizona Heat	DePaul
5	Lindsey Gardner^{+}	2B	Colorado Altitude	Texas
6	Monica Triner	P	NY/NJ Juggernaut	South Florida
7	Kathy Morton^{#}	OF	San Antonio Armadillos from New England Riptide	SW Louisiana
8	Elizabeth Blake Baskin^{#}	C	Texas Thunder from Akron Racers	West Florida

==== Round 2 ====
Pick	Player	Pos.	NPF Team	College
9	Lea Mishlan^{#}	SS	San Antonio Armadillos	South Florida
10	Tiffany Bolton^{#}	2B	Akron Racers from Texas Thunder	Ohio
11	Kasey Poet^{#}	3B	Sacramento Sunbirds	Cal Poly
12	Amanda Jensen^{#}	SS	Arizona Heat	Olivet Nazarene
13	Randi Berg	2B	Colorado Altitude	Fresno State
14	Alicia Smith	OF	NY/NJ Juggernaut	Hofstra
15	Sarah Lockett^{#}	3B	New England Riptide	Kennesaw State
16	Gina Ramacci^{#}	C	Akron Racers	DePaul

==== Round 3 ====
Pick	Player	Pos.	NPF Team	College
17	Stormy Hanson^{#}	C	San Antonio Armadillos	Indiana
18	Mindy Williams-Cleeland^{#}	OF	Texas Thunder	Washington
19	Nikki Beal	2B	Sacramento Sunbirds	Canada
20	Rosette Rough^{#}	LF	Arizona Heat	Long Island
21	Nikki Bowey^{#}	OF	Colorado Altitude	Mercer
22	Jen Smith	OF	NY/NJ Juggernaut	Hofstra
23	Mary Flynn^{#}	IF	New England Riptide	Maine
24	Leslie Poole^{#}	P	Akron Racers	Fresno State

==== Round 4 ====
Pick	Player	Pos.	NPF Team	College
25	Jessica Wheeler^{#}	SS	San Antonio Armadillos	San Jacinto College
26	Stephanie DeFeo^{#}	1B-WPSL	Texas Thunder	Louisiana-Lafayette
27	Jaime Wohlbach	C	Sacramento Sunbirds	Kutztown
28	Tiffany Maddox^{#}	IF	Arizona Heat	Judson College
29	Rachel Gensch^{#}	CF	Colorado Altitude	Bradley
30	Emily Marino^{#}	C	NY/NJ Juggernaut	Florida
31	Cherry Fu^{#}	IF	New England Riptide	Harvard
32	Stacey Nagel^{#}	C	Akron Racers	Mercer

=== Senior Draft ===
Following are the 48 selections from the 2004 NPF Senior Draft:

==== Round 1 ====
Pick	Player	Pos.	NPF Team	College
1	Iyhia McMichael^{+}	OF	Akron Racers	Mississippi State
2	Jessica Allister	C	New England Riptide	Stanford
3	Jenny Gladding^{#}	P	NY/NJ Juggernaut	Florida
4	Phelan Wright	3B	Colorado Altitude	Arizona State
5	Keira Goerl^{#}	P	Arizona Heat	UCLA
6	Stephanie Ramos	OF	Sacramento Sunbirds	UCLA
7	Mackenzie Vandergeest^{+}	C	Texas Thunder	Arizona
8	Dana Sorenson	P	New England Riptide from San Antonio Armadillos	Stanford

==== Round 2 ====
Pick	Player	Pos.	NPF Team	College
9	Jen Poore^{+}		Akron Racers	Oregon
10	Jennifer Jessup^{#}	IF	New England Riptide	Mississippi State
11	Tamara Poppe^{#}	UT	NY/NJ Juggernaut	Texas
12	Nicole Barber	OF	Colorado Altitude	Georgia
13	Claire Sua^{#}	1B	Arizona Heat	UCLA
14	Christen Bedwell	OF	Sacramento Sunbirds	Cal-State Northridge
15	Peaches James^{+}	P	Texas Thunder	Nebraska
16	Carri Leto^{+}	IF	San Antonio Armadillos	Northwestern

==== Round 3 ====
Pick	Player	Pos.	NPF Team	College
17	Jami Trinidad^{#}	C	Akron Racers	UC Santa Barbara
18	Jackie McClain^{#}	1B	New England Riptide	Alabama
19	Aisha Franke^{#}	OF	NY/NJ Juggernaut	UMass
20	Nicole Trimboli^{+}	OF	Colorado Altitude	Nebraska
21	Wendy Allen^{+}	P	Arizona Heat	Arizona
22	Amanda Simpson^{#}	OF	Sacramento Sunbirds	UCLA
23	Kristen Zaleski^{+}	CF	Texas Thunder	Southwest Texas State
24	Tara Knudsen	SS	San Antonio Armadillos	Georgia Tech

==== Round 4 ====
Pick	Player	Pos.	NPF Team	College
25	Oli Keohohou^{+}		Akron Racers	Long Beach State
26	Rachel McGinnis		New England Riptide	Missouri
27	Alexis Gary^{#}	C	NY/NJ Juggernaut	Temple
28	Kristen Farber^{#}	P	Colorado Altitude	Arizona State
29	Amanda Oleson^{#}	IF	Arizona Heat	Washington
30	Heather Field	SS	Sacramento Sunbirds	Virginia
31	Elisa Vasquez^{#}	C	Texas Thunder	Florida State
32	LaDonia Hughes	OF	San Antonio Armadillos	LSU

==== Round 5 ====
Pick	Player	Pos.	NPF Team	College
33	Tia Bollinger^{#}	P	Akron Racers	Washington
34	Brooke Gentzler^{#}	1B	New England Riptide	St. Cloud State
35	Laura Harms	SS	NY/NJ Juggernaut	Bradley
36	Ricki Walker^{#}	UT	Colorado Altitude	Colorado State
37	Jessica Van der Linden^{#}	P	Arizona Heat	Florida State
38	Annie Stevens^{#}	3B	Sacramento Sunbirds	Nevada
39	Laura Leonetti	IF	Texas Thunder	Brown
40	Amissu Meashintubby^{#}	P	San Antonio Armadillos	Oregon

==== Round 6 ====
Pick	Player	Pos.	NPF Team	College
41	Kelcy Murphy^{#}	IF	Akron Racers	San Diego State
42	Jamie Carey^{#}	UT	New England Riptide	Miami(Ohio)
43	Callie Piper	C	NY/NJ Juggernaut	Florida Atlantic
44	Meghann Reiss^{#}	1B	Colorado Altitude	Wisconsin
45	Cheryl Bolding^{+}		Arizona Heat	Point Loma Nazarene
46	Nicole Deathridge^{#}	P	Sacramento Sunbirds	Sacramento State
47	Jennifer Waterman^{#}	C	Texas Thunder	Mississippi State
48	Meghan Clark^{#}	1B	San Antonio Armadillos	Mercer

=== Supplemental Draft ===
Following are the 17 selections from the 2004 NPF Supplemental Draft:

Pick	Player	Pos.	NPF Team	College
1	Tara Knudsen	SS	New England Riptide	Georgia Tech
2	Carri Leto^{+}	IF	NY/NJ Juggernaut	Northwestern
3	Stormy Hanson^{#}	C	California Sunbirds	Indiana
4	Stacey Phillips^{#}	1B	Akron Racers	Michigan State
5	Nicole Barber	OF-Washington Glory	Texas Thunder	Georgia
6	Ricki Walker^{#}	UT	Arizona Heat	Colorado State
7	Nikki Bowey^{#}	OF	New England Riptide	Mercer
8	LaDonia Hughes	OF	NY/NJ Juggernaut	LSU
9	Nicole Trimboli^{+}	OF	Akron Racers	Nebraska
10	Jessica Wheeler^{#}	SS	Texas Thunder	San Jacinto College
11	Brenda DeBlaes^{#}	SS	Arizona Heat	Belgium
12	Kathy Morton^{#}	OF	NY/NJ Juggernaut	S Western Louisiana
13	Lea Mishlan^{#}	SS	Texas Thunder	South Florida
14	Monica Triner	P	Arizona Heat	South Florida
15	Anissa Meashintubby^{#}	P	NY/NJ Juggernaut	Oregon
16	Alicia Smith	OF	Arizona Heat	Hofstra
17	Meghan Clark^{#}	1B	Akron Racers	Mercer
