= 1999 WPSL Draft =

1999 WPSL Senior Draft

General information
- Sport: softball
- Date(s): December 5, 1998
- Location: St. Petersburg Beach, Florida

Overview
- 60 selections total selections
- League: Women's Pro Softball League
- First selection: Isonette Polonius 3B East Carolina selected by Durham Dragons
- Most selections: Akron Racers, 13 picks
- Fewest selections: Virginia Roadsters, 7 picks

The 1999 WPSL Senior Draft was the third annual collegiate draft for the WPSL/WPF's 1999 season, and was held on Saturday, December 5, in St. Petersburg Beach, Fla, at the Tradewinds Resort in conjunction with the 1998 NFCA National Convention.

== Draft Selections ==
Following are the 60 selections from the 1999 WPSL draft:

Position key:
C = Catcher; UT = Utility infielder; INF = Infielder; 1B = First base; 2B =Second base SS = Shortstop; 3B = Third base; OF = Outfielder; RF = Right field; CF = Center field; LF = Left field; P = Pitcher; RHP = right-handed Pitcher; LHP = left-handed Pitcher; DP =Designated player
Positions are listed as combined for those who can play multiple positions.

^{#}	Denotes player who has not played in the WPSL or the NPF (Note: Unless otherwise noted, this was verified against the Historical Roster on the NPF's website.)

=== Round 1 ===
Pick	Player	Pos.	WPSL Team	College
1	Isonette Polonius^{#}	3B	Durham Dragons (Note: Virginia Roadsters → Durham Dragons: Dragons traded P Carla Brookbank to the Roadsters for the first overall pick.)	East Carolina
2	Monica Triner	P/DP	Tampa Bay FireStix	South Florida
3	Traci Conrad	1B	Akron Racers (Note: Durham Dragons → Akron Racers: The Racers traded Liz Mizera for the third overall pick.)	Michigan
4	Brandee McArthur	P/UT	Carolina Diamonds	Pacific
5	Jaime Maxey^{#}	3B	Georgia Pride	Fresno State
6	Liza Brown	P/OF	Akron Racers	DePaul

=== Round 2 ===
Pick	Player	Pos.	WPSL Team	College
7	Shannon Beeler	SS	Virginia Roadsters	Minnesota
8	Jaime Foutch	1B	Tampa Bay FireStix	Oklahoma State
9	Autumn Anderson^{#}	P	Durham Dragons	Mississippi State
10	Megumi Takasaki	C	Carolina Diamonds	California
11	Jamie Lowry^{#}	2B	Georgia Pride	Missouri
12	Stephanie Midthun^{#}	OF	Akron Racers	Minnesota

=== Round 3 ===
Pick	Player	Pos.	WPSL Team	College
13	Jody Dean^{#}	OF	Virginia Roadsters	Northern Iowa
14	Jody Chmielewski	OF	Tampa Bay FireStix	Oregon State
15	Katie Cichy	SS	Durham Dragons	Cal State Sacramento
16	Jaime Chenevey	C	Akron Racers (Note: Akron Racers: The Racers received this pick as compensation for Corina Lilly)	Ohio State
17	Kim Slover (Note: Slover was drafted by the Tampa Bay Firestix in the 1998 draft, but opted to complete her collegiate eligibility before going pro.)	1B	Georgia Pride	Missouri
18	Kelly Gentle^{#}	P	Akron Racers	Hawaiʻi

=== Round 4 ===
Pick	Player	Pos.	WPSL Team	College
19	Catherine Davis^{#}	OF	Virginia Roadsters	Michigan
20	Nikki Cockrell^{#}	2B/SS	Tampa Bay FireStix	Texas
21	Evette Grayson^{#}	OF	Durham Dragons	Louisiana Tech
22	Tara Glaister^{#}	P	Carolina Diamonds	Cal State Northridge
23	Danielle Cox	OF	Georgia Pride	Florida State
24	Kellie Metzger	C	Akron Racers	Akron

=== Round 5 ===
Pick	Player	Pos.	WPSL Team	College
25	Jenny Oermann^{#}	SS	Virginia Roadsters	Southeast Missouri State
26	Janeen Sobush^{#}	C/OF	Tampa Bay FireStix	South Florida
27	Stephanie Norton^{#}	3B	Durham Dragons	Colorado State
28	Katie May^{#}	SS/3B	Carolina Diamonds	California
29	Jennifer Thompson^{#}	P	Georgia Pride	South Florida
30	Heidi Geier^{#}	2B	Akron Racers	Creighton

=== Round 6 ===
Pick	Player	Pos.	WPSL Team	College
31	Heather Stella^{#}	3B	Virginia Roadsters	Illinois State
32	Amy Doyle^{#}	OF	Tampa Bay FireStix	Ball State
33	Marcy Crouch^{#}	RHP	Durham Dragons	Stanford
34	Julie Eggert^{#}	1B	Carolina Diamonds	Kennesaw State
35	Samantha Digirolamo	3B	Georgia Pride	Nicholls State
36	Raven Coberg^{#}	3B	Akron Racers	UNLV

=== Round 7 ===
Pick	Player	Pos.	WPSL Team	College
37	Melanie Muniz^{#}	OF	Durham Dragons (Note: Durham Dragons: The Dragons received this pick as compensation for Carla Brookbank)	Long Beach State
38	Stephanie Carew^{#}	DP	Tampa Bay FireStix	Chapman
39	Jen Morris^{#}	1B	Durham Dragons	Ohio University
40	Jennie Foyle^{#}	2B	Carolina Diamonds	Stanford
41	Dana Bennett^{#}	2B	Georgia Pride	Hofstra
42	Michelle Singer^{#}	UT	Akron Racers	Oklahoma State

=== Round 8 ===
Pick	Player	Pos.	WPSL Team	College
43	Kris McCleary^{#}	C	Virginia Roadsters	Notre Dame
44	Samantha Mercier^{#}	2B	Tampa Bay FireStix	Purdue
45	Stephanie Little	C	Durham Dragons	Cal State Fullerton
46	Lori Reese^{#}	SS	Carolina Diamonds	Virginia
47	Lindsey Parker^{#}	P	Georgia Pride	Fresno State
48	Cheryl Anne Palaroan^{#}	OF	Akron Racers	Ohio State

=== Round 9 ===
Pick	Player	Pos.	WPSL Team	College
49	Becky Blevins^{#}	RHP	Virginia Roadsters	Stanford
50	Jana Jenkins	2B	Akron Racers (Note: Akron Racers: The Racers received this pick as compensation for Amber Wright)	Akron
51	Janine Repole	2B/P	Durham Dragons	North Carolina-Charlotte
52	Martha Covington^{#}	3B	Carolina Diamonds	Campbell
53	Erryn Gutjahr^{#}	1B	Georgia Pride	San Diego State
54	Sunny Litteral^{#}	OF	Akron Racers	Ashland

=== Round 10 ===
Pick	Player	Pos.	WPSL Team	College
55
56	Dana Bailey^{#}	OF	Tampa Bay FireStix	Florida State
57	Kim Pietro	OF	Durham Dragons	South Carolina
58	Jane Teixeira^{#}	OF	Carolina Diamonds	Texas
59	Chris Puccio^{#}	UT	Georgia Pride	San Diego State
60	Nicole Cefaratti^{#}	OF	Akron Racers	Buffalo State

== See also ==
- List of professional sports leagues
- List of professional sports teams in the United States and Canada
