= 2001 WPSL Draft =

General information
- Sport: softball
- Date(s): 5
- Location: San Antonio, TX

Overview
- 24 total selections
- League: Women's Pro Softball League
- Teams: 4
- First selection: Courtney Dale P/OF; UCLA selected by Tampa Bay FireStix
- Most selections: Each had 6 picks
- Fewest selections: Each had 6 picks

Before the Women's Pro Softball League (WPSL) decided to suspend play for the 2001 season, it held its regularly scheduled 2001 WPSL Senior Draft on December 2, 2000, at Adam's Mark Hotel San Antonio Riverwalk in conjunction with the National Fastpitch Coaches Association (NFCA) Convention. As the league did not resume play until 2004, many draftees never played in the league. However, some did, even making an All-Star team.

Following are the 24 selections from the 2001 WPSL draft, along with their playing experience, if any (and recorded on the NPF's historical rosters.

Position key:
C = Catcher; UT = Utility infielder; INF = Infielder; 1B = First base; 2B =Second base SS = Shortstop; 3B = Third base; OF = Outfielder; RF = Right field; CF = Center field; LF = Left field; P = Pitcher; RHP = right-handed Pitcher; LHP = left-handed Pitcher; DP =Designated player
Positions are listed as combined for those who can play multiple positions.

^{+}	Denotes player who has been selected to at least one All-NPF team
^{#}	Denotes player who has not played in the NPF

== Draft Selections ==
^{+}	Denotes player who has been selected for at least NPF All-Star team
^{#}	Denotes player who never played in the NPF

=== Round 1 ===
Pick	Player	Pos.	College	Drafted by	WPSL/NPF Experience
1	Courtney Dale^{#}	P/OF	UCLA	Tampa Bay FireStix	Never played in NPF
2	Lindsey Collins^{+}	C	Arizona	Akron Racers	NPF All-Stars(2003), NY/NJ Juggernaut(2004)
3	Becky Lemke^{#}	P	Arizona	Ohio Pride	Never played in NPF
4	Ashley Lewis^{#}	P	LSU	Florida Wahoos	Never played in NPF

=== Round 2 ===
Pick	Player	Pos.	College	Drafted by	WPSL/NPF Experience
5	Allison Andrade	INF	Arizona	Akron Racers	NPF All-Stars(2003), California Sunbirds(2004)
6	Lisa Carey^{#}	SS	Oklahoma	Ohio Pride	Never played in NPF
7	Ashli Barrett^{#}	C	Oklahoma	Florida Wahoos	Never played in NPF
8	Kim DePaul^{#}	3B	Washington	Tampa Bay FireStix	Never played in NPF

=== Round 3 ===
Pick	Player	Pos.	College	Drafted by	WPSL/NPF Experience
9	Serita Brooks^{#}	OF	Florida State	Ohio Pride	Never played in NPF
10	Lauren Bauer	OF	Arizona	Florida Wahoos	NPF All-Stars(2003), NY/NJ Juggernaut(2004), Arizona Heat(2005)
11	Ginger Jones-Powers	1B	Alabama	Tampa Bay FireStix	Texas Thunder(2004)
12	Racheal Goodpaster^{#}	SS	UNLV	Akron Racers	Never played in NPF

=== Round 4 ===
Pick	Player	Pos.	College	Drafted by	WPSL/NPF Experience
13	Brenda Iglesia^{#}	3B/DP	Cal State Fullerton	Florida Wahoos	Never played in NPF
14	Andrea Davis^{#}	UT	Oklahoma	Tampa Bay FireStix	Never played in NPF
15	Nicole Giordano^{#}	OF	Arizona	Akron Racers	Never played in NPF
16	Toni Mascarenas	3B	Arizona	Ohio Pride	Arizona Heat(2005–06)

=== Round 5 ===
Pick	Player	Pos.	College	Drafted by	WPSL/NPF Experience
17	Bronwyn Blair^{#}	OF	Virginia Tech	Tampa Bay FireStix	Never played in NPF
18	Janette Koshell^{#}	OF/P	Tennessee	Akron Racers	Never played in NPF
19	Lupe Brambila^{#}	OF	UCLA	Ohio Pride	Never played in NPF
20	Charla Moore^{#}	P	Texas	Florida Wahoos	Never played in NPF

=== Round 6 ===
Pick	Player	Pos.	College	Drafted by	WPSL/NPF Experience
21	Kelley Askew^{#}	C/OF	Alabama	Akron Racers	Never played in NPF
22	Stephanie Swenson^{#}	P	UCLA	Ohio Pride	Never played in NPF
23	Jamie Fuente^{#}	P	Nebraska	Florida Wahoos	Never played in NPF
24	Sarah Farnworth^{#}	P/OF	Cal State Northridge	Tampa Bay FireStix	Never played in NPF
