= Big Ten Conference Softball Player of the Year =

Big Ten Conference Player of the Year
- Awarded for: the most outstanding college softball player in the Big Ten Conference
- Country: United States

History
- First award: 1985
- Most recent: Jordan Woolery, UCLA

The Big Ten Conference Player of the Year is a college softball award given to the Big Ten Conference's most outstanding player. The award was first given following the 1985 season, with both pitchers and position players eligible. After the 1992 season, the Big Ten Conference Softball Pitcher of the Year award was created to honor the most outstanding pitcher.

== Key ==
*	Awarded a College National Player of the Year award: the USA Softball Collegiate Player of the Year

== Winners ==
Season	Player	School	Position	Reference
1985	Lisa Ishikawa	Northwestern	P	
1986	Barb Drake	Minnesota	P/C	
1987	Vicki Morrow	Michigan	P/1B	
1988	Michelle Bolster	Michigan	P	
1989	Jenny Allard	Michigan	P/3B	
1990	Terri McFarland	Iowa	P	
1991	Kari Blank; Karen Jackson	Minnesota; Iowa	IF; P	
1992	Patti Benedict	Michigan	OF	
1993	Patti Benedict (2)	Michigan	OF	
1994	Michelle Venturella	Indiana	C	
1995	Sara Griffin	Michigan	U	
1996	Sara Griffin (2)	Michigan	U	
1997	Debbie Bilbao	Iowa	P	
1998	Traci Conrad	Michigan	1B	
1999	Traci Conrad (2)	Michigan	1B	
2000	Brooke Siebel	Northwestern	DP	
2001	Melissa Taylor	Michigan	OF	
2002	Wendy Allen	Ohio State	U	
2003	Marissa Young	Michigan	U	
2004	Jessica Merchant	Michigan	SS	
2005	Garland Cooper	Northwestern	1B	
2006	Garland Cooper (2)	Northwestern	1B	
2007	Garland Cooper (3)	Northwestern	1B	
2008	Tammy Williams	Northwestern	SS	
2009	Tammy Williams (2)	Northwestern	SS	
2010	Nikki Nemitz; Maggie Viefhaus	Michigan; Michigan	U 3B	
2011	Amanda Chidester	Michigan	3B	
2012	Amanda Chidester (2)	Michigan	1B	
2013	Sierra Romero	Michigan	SS	
2014	Sierra Romero (2)	Michigan	SS	
2015	Sara Groenewegen	Minnesota	P	
2016	Sierra Romero (3)	Michigan	SS	
2017	Kendyl Lindaman	Minnesota	C	
2018	Kendyl Lindaman (2)	Minnesota	C	
2019	Kayla Konwent	Wisconsin	1B	
2021	Lexi Blair	Michigan	OF	
2022	Rachel Lewis	Northwestern	OF	
2023	Taryn Kern	Indiana	2B	
2024	Jess Oakland	Minnesota	SS	
2025	Jordy Bahl	Nebraska	P	
2026	Jordan Woolery	UCLA	INF	

== Winners by school ==
School	Winners	Years
Michigan	19	1987, 1988, 1989, 1992, 1993, 1995, 1996, 1998, 1999, 2001, 2003, 2004, 2010, 2011, 2012, 2013, 2014, 2016, 2021
Northwestern	8	1985, 2000, 2005, 2006, 2007, 2008, 2009, 2022
Minnesota	5	1986, 2015, 2017, 2018, 2024
Iowa	3	1990, 1991, 1997
Indiana	2	1994, 2023
Nebraska	1	2025
Ohio State	1	2002
UCLA	1	2026
Wisconsin	1	2019
Illinois	0	—
Maryland	0	—
Michigan State	0	—
Penn State	0	—
Purdue	0	—
Rutgers	0	—
