= 2002 Women's Pro Softball League season =

2002 WPSL Season
- League: Women's Pro Softball League
- Sport: softball
- Number of games: 2

WPSL seasons
- ← 2001 2003 →

The 2002 Women's Pro Softball League season was a year after the WPSL suspended play in 2001 and before it rebranded, toured, and resumed competitive play as National Pro Fastpitch in 2003 and 2004. From 1997 to 2002, the league operated under the names Women's Pro Fastpitch (WPF) and Women's Pro Softball League (WPSL).

In December 2001 WPSL announced that Commissioner/CEO John D. Carroll was stepping down to be replaced by Richard A. Levine as the WPSL President and CEO. Levine had been a WPSL executive vice president and had experience marketing the 1994 FIFA World Cup and as the first general manager of MLS' Colorado Rapids.

Initially, WPSL intended to reorganize the league's ownership structure and resume play in 2003 with 6 to 10 teams. By August 2002, tryouts for the new teams, originally planned for December 2002, were postponed to December 2003. WPSL announced a 2003 Fastpitch Festival Tour as a marketing and promotional tool to bring exposure and local support to the league in advance of the 2004 relaunch.

The only games played by WPSL in 2003 were a double header, as part of the 2002 National Softball Association (NSA) Fastpitch World Series activities, featuring WPSL All-Stars playing Tennessee All-Stars on July 20 at Jim Frost Stadium in Chattanooga, TN. The WPSL All-Stars won both games by scores of 13-1 and 7-1.

On November 21, WPSL announced its new name: National Pro Fastpitch (NPF).

== Roster ==
The roster of the 2002 WPSL All-Star softball team is listed below:

| Name | Position | College | Hometown |
|---|---|---|---|
| Allison Andrade | SS | Arizona | Morgan Hill, CA |
| Lisa Carey | 1B/SS | Oklahoma | Topeka, KS |
| Nancy Evans | 3B/UT | Arizona | Glendale, CA |
| Chrissy Gil | OF | Arizona | West Covina, CA |
| Erika Hanson | OF | Arizona | Thousand Oaks, CA |
| Lisa Iancin | 2B | California | Covina, CA |
| Becky Lemke | P | Arizona | Fountain Hills, AZ |
| Julie Marshall | C/1B | UCLA | Bethel Island, CA |
| Scia Maumausolo | DP/C | CSU Northridge | San Diego, CA |
| Amanda Renfro | P | Texas Tech | Houston, TX |
| Kendall Richards | 3B | Texas A&M | Eugene, OR |
| Cheri Shinn | OF/UT | CSU Northridge | Olivehurst, CA |

Head coach Tim Kiernan

Assistant coach Chuck Windmiller

== See also ==
- List of professional sports leagues
- List of professional sports teams in the United States and Canada
