= 2005 National Pro Fastpitch season =

2005 NPF Season
- League: National Pro Fastpitch
- Sport: softball
- Duration: June 2, 2005 - August 21, 2005
- Teams: 6
- TV partner: ESPN

2005 NPF Draft
- Top draft pick: Amy Harre; Southern Illinois
- Picked by: Chicago Bandits

Regular Season
- Regular Season Champions: Chicago Bandits

Cowles Cup
- Champions: Akron Racers
- Runners-up: Chicago Bandits

NPF seasons
- ← 2004 2006 →

The 2005 National Pro Fastpitch season was the second season of professional softball under the name National Pro Fastpitch (NPF) for the only professional women's fastpitch softball league in the United States. From 1997 to 2002, NPF operated under the names Women's Pro Fastpitch (WPF) and Women's Pro Softball League (WPSL). Each year, the playoff teams battle for the Cowles Cup.

== Teams, cities and stadiums ==
Team	City	Stadium
Akron Racers	Akron, Ohio	Firestone Stadium
Arizona Heat	Tucson, Arizona	Hi Corbett Field
Chicago Bandits	Lisle, Illinois	Benedictine University Sports Complex
New England Riptide	Lowell, Massachusetts	Martin Softball Field
New York Juggernaut	Hempstead, New York	Hofstra University Softball Stadium
Texas Thunder	League City, Texas	Wrigley Field at Big City Dreams Sports Park

National Pro Fastpitch teams

== Milestones and events ==
The expansion Chicago Bandits joined the league for the 2005 season.

The New York Juggernaut announced a new owner, John Schmitz of Long Island, NY. The team also introduced 1996 Olympic Gold Medalist Julie Smith as their general manager and head coach.

The Arizona Heat named Stacy Iveson as their 2005 field manager.

NPF's telecast included ESPN2 broadcasting the NPF All-Star Game and the NPF Championship Game. Comcast Sports Net Chicago showed select Chicago Bandits games and Telecare televised certain Juggernaut games.

== Player acquisition ==
=== College draft ===
The 2005 NPF Senior Draft was held February 7, 2005. Amy Harre of Southern Illinois was selected first by the Chicago Bandits.

=== Notable transactions ===
Various Olympians joined NPF after winning the gold medal in Softball at the 2004 Summer Olympics:

- The expansion Bandits' early signings included a number of Olympic gold medalists, among them three-time Olympic Gold Medalist Leah O’Brien-Amico and Jennie Finch.
- The Juggernaut signed 2004 Olympic gold medalist Natasha Watley.
- The Arizona Heat signed gold medalist Jessica Mendoza. Mendoza joined other Heat US gold medalists Lovieanne Jung and Tairia Mims-Flowers
- The Racers also signed players from the 2004 Olympic team: infielder Crystl Bustos, outfielder Kelly Kretschman, and catcher Jenny Topping.

== League standings ==
Team	GP	W	L	Pct.	GB
Chicago Bandits	48	41	7	.854	-
Akron Racers	46	36	10	.783	4
Texas Thunder	47	35	12	.745	5.5
New York Juggernaut	45	31	14	.689	8.5
Arizona Heat	46	30	16	.652	10
New England Riptide	48	25	23	.521	16

The 2005 schedule included a 48-game regular season schedule for each NPF teams.

The California Sunbirds played a partial schedule. The Sunbirds hoped to return to NPF full-time, but never did. Games were on the schedule against international teams: Australia, Canada, China, Russia and Venezuela.

Potential expansion teams also appeared on the schedule. These were Stratford Brakettes, Phoenix Flames, SoCal Schutt Hurricanes, Peoria Outlaws, Illinois Cougars, St. Louis Saints and the Long Island Angels. Of these candidates, only the Brakettes ever became a full-time NPF member, for only one season in 2006.

All games against international teams and expansion candidates counted in the standings for the primary NPF teams.

== NPF Championship ==

The 2005 NPF Championship Series was held at Benedictine University Sports Complex in Lisle, Illinois August 27 and 28. The top four teams qualified and were seeded based on the final standings. The series matched the teams up in a double-elimination bracket. The series matched the teams up in a single-elimination bracket.

NPF Semifinals (Aug. 27)
Chicago Bandits	6
New York Juggernaut	3
Akron Racers	1
Texas Thunder	0

NPF Championship (Aug 28)
Chicago Bandits	4
Akron Racers	5

2006 NPF Championship Series - Game 1
Game	Date	Score	Location
1	August 27	Chicago Bandits 6, New England Riptide 3	Lisle, Illinois

2006 NPF Championship Series - Game 2
Game	Date	Score	Location
2	August 27	Akron Racers 1, Texas Thunder 0	Lisle, Illinois

2006 NPF Championship Series - Game 3
Game	Date	Score	Location
3	August 28	Akron Racers 5, Chicago Bandits 4 (8 innings)	Lisle, Illinois
Akron Racers win NPF Championship

=== Championship Game ===
Team	Top Batter	Stats.
Akron Racers	Oli Keohohou	1-4 RBI 2B
Chicago Bandits	Selena Collins	1-2 RBI 2B BB

Team	Pitcher	IP	H	R	ER	BB	SO	AB	BF
Akron Racers	Brandee McArthur	1.1	3	4	3	3	0	4	10
Akron Racers	Jamie Southern	2.0	1	0	0	2	1	5	10
Akron Racers	Radara McHugh (W)	4.2	2	0	0	2	7	16	18
Chicago Bandits	Lauren Bay-Regula	4.2	6	3	1	2	5	21	23
Chicago Bandits	Jennie Finch (L)	3.1	4	2	1	1	2	15	16

2005 NPF Championship Series MVP
Player	Club

== NPF All-Star Game ==
The 2005 NPF All-Star Game was held August 28. The East All-Star team included players from New York Juggernaut, the New England Riptide, and the Akron Racers. The West All-Star team included players from Chicago Bandits, the Arizona Heat, and the Texas Thunder. The East won by a score of 2-1, and Iyhia McMichael of Akron Racers was chosen Most Valuable Player.

2005 NPF ALL-STAR ROSTER - WEST TEAM
Player	NPF Team	Position
Pitchers
Lauren Bay	Chicago Bandits	P
Lindsay Chouinard	Chicago Bandits	P
Jennie Finch	Chicago Bandits	P
Amanda Freed	Texas Thunder	P / 1B
Christa Williams	Texas Thunder	P
Catchers
Selena Collins	Chicago Bandits	C
Stacey Nuveman	Arizona Heat	C
Infield
Clare Burnum	Texas Thunder	3B
Jaime Clark	Chicago Bandits	SS / UT
Vicky Galindo	Chicago Bandits	3B
Lovieanne Jung	Arizona Heat	SS / 2B
Tairia Mims-Flowers	Arizona Heat	UT
Outfield
Jessica Mendoza	Arizona Heat	OF
Kim Nesloney	Texas Thunder	OF
Anne Steffan	Chicago Bandits	OF / 2B
Kristen Zaleski	Texas Thunder	OF

2005 NPF ALL-STAR ROSTER - EAST TEAM
Player	NPF Team	Position
Pitchers
Jodie Cox	New York Juggernaut	P / UT
Danielle Henderson	New England Riptide	P
Peaches James	New York Juggernaut	P / UT
Brandee McArthur	Akron Racers	P
Jamie Southern	Akron Racers	P / UT
Catchers
Ashley Courtney	New England Riptide	C / OF
Ryan Realmuto	New York Juggernaut	C
Jenny Topping	Akron Racers	C
Infield
Lyndsey Angus	New England Riptide	UT
Crystl Bustos	Akron Racers	3B
Kristin Johnson	Akron Racers	SS
Carri Leto	New York Juggernaut	2B
Natasha Watley	New York Juggernaut	SS
Kellie Wilkerson	New England Riptide	1B /OF
Sarah Anderson	New England Riptide	1B
Outfield
Iyhlia McMichael	Akron Racers	OF
Trena Peel	New York Juggernaut	OF
Nicole Trimboli	Akron Racers	1B /OF

== Annual awards ==
Regular season champions
Chicago Bandits

Award	Player	Team
Player of the Year Award	Kristen Zaleski	Texas Thunder
Co-Pitchers of the Year	Jennie Finch	Chicago Bandits
Co-Pitchers of the Year	Lauren Bay	Chicago Bandits
Homerun Derby Champion	Stacey Nuveman	Arizona Heat
Defensive Player of the Year	Lisa Iancin	New England Riptide
Offensive Player of the Year	Crystl Bustos	Akron Racers
Co-Managers of the Year	Chicago Bandits -- Eugene Lenti and Mickey Dean	

== See also ==
- List of professional sports leagues
- List of professional sports teams in the United States and Canada
