= Adrian Gregory =

American softball coach

Biographical details
- Born: September 21, 1982 (age 44); Post, Texas, U.S.

Playing career

Softball
- 2002–2005: Texas A&M
- Position: Outfielder/shortstop/second base

Coaching career (HC unless noted)
- 2006: Texas A&M (Student asst.)
- 2006–2007: New England Riptide (asst.)
- 2008–2010: Utah (asst.)
- 2011–2014: Sam Houston State (asst.)
- 2015–2020: Texas Tech
- 2022: Texas A&M (Volunteer asst.)

Head coaching record
- Overall: 157–147 (.516)

Adrian Kayle Gregory (born September 21, 1982) is an American softball coach who was most recently head coach at Texas Tech.

== Early life and education ==
Born in Post, Texas, Gregory graduated from Livingston High School in Livingston, Texas in 2001 and attended Texas A&M University. At Texas A&M, Gregory played for the Texas A&M Aggies softball team from 2002 to 2005 under head coach Jo Evans. In 2002, started all 58 games at left or right field in her first season, batting .287 with six game-winning RBIs while committing no errors. Then in 2003, Gregory started every game at second base and hit .290 with 32 RBI. As a junior in 2004, Gregory became the starting shortstop. In 2005, Gregory batted .287 with 36 RBI and nine home runs as the starting shortstop on a Texas A&M team that went 47–10 and advanced to NCAA Super Regionals. Gregory graduated from Texas A&M in 2006 with a bachelor's degree in recreation, parks and tourism sciences with a minor in business administration.

== Coaching career ==
=== Early coaching career (2006–2014) ===
While completing her undergraduate studies, Gregory was a student assistant for Texas A&M softball in the spring of 2006. Then from 2006 to 2007, Gregory was an assistant coach for the New England Riptide of National Pro Fastpitch. Returning to the college level, Gregory was an assistant coach at Utah from 2008 to 2010 then at Sam Houston State from 2011 to 2014, during which Sam Houston State reached the top 20 in national batting average in 2013.

=== Texas Tech (2015–2020) ===
On June 6, 2014, Adrian Gregory was announced as the new head coach of the Texas Tech softball program. Texas Tech had losing records in her first three seasons as head coach before going 31–28 in 2018. Then in 2019, Texas Tech qualified for the NCAA Tournament for the first time under Gregory and finished 42–16. Gregory signed a five-year contract extension on July 17, 2019.

In 2020, Texas Tech started 17–9 before the softball season was canceled due to COVID-19.

After six seasons, Gregory resigned from Texas Tech on September 22, 2020. On the day of her resignation, USA Today revealed that on the previous day, Texas Tech completed an internal review of the softball program. According to the USA Today report, the internal review found allegations of physical abuse and racially insensitive comments from Gregory, and 60 percent of surveyed softball athletes gave Gregory negative year-end reviews following the 2018–19 school year. Gregory's cumulative record at Texas Tech was 157–147. However, Texas Tech never had a winning record in Big 12 Conference play under Gregory.

=== Texas A&M (since 2022) ===
On August 6, 2021, Adrian Gregory was announced as a volunteer assistant coach at Texas A&M.

== Head coaching record ==
Record table
| Season | Team | Overall | Conference | Standing | Postseason |
|---|---|---|---|---|---|
Texas Tech Red Raiders (Big 12 Conference) (2015–2020)
| 2015 | Texas Tech | 25–26 | 8–10 | 4th | |
| 2016 | Texas Tech | 23–32 | 6–12 | 6th | |
| 2017 | Texas Tech | 19–36 | 4–14 | 6th | |
| 2018 | Texas Tech | 31–28 | 5–13 | 5th | |
| 2019 | Texas Tech | 42–16 | 8–10 | 4th | NCAA Regional |
| 2020 | Texas Tech | 17–9 | 0–0 | | Season canceled due to COVID-19 |
| Texas Tech: | | 157–147 (.516) | 31–59 (.344) | | |
| Total: | | 157–147 (.516) | | | |
