= Ani Nyhus =

Canadian softball player

Personal information
- Born: August 18, 1983 (age 42) Prince George, British Columbia

Sport
- Sport: softball

Ani Nyhus (born August 18, 1983) is a Canadian softball pitcher. She played for the University of Oregon during the 2004 and 2005 seasons. In 2004, she had a record of 25-13 and was named to the All-Pac-10 first team. She was a part of the Canadian Softball team who finished 5th at the 2004 Summer Olympics.
