= Julie Smith (softball) =

American softball player

Biographical details
- Born: May 10, 1968 (age 58); Glendora, California, U.S.

Playing career
- 1987: Texas A&M
- 1990–1991: Fresno State

Coaching career (HC unless noted)
- 2007–2018: University of La Verne

Head coaching record
- Overall: 287–185 (.608)
Medal record
Women's softball
Representing the United States
Olympic Games
Gold medal – first place	1996 Atlanta	Team competition

Julie M. Smith (born May 10, 1968) is an American, former collegiate All-American, gold-medal winning Olympian softball player and coach. Smith played college softball for Texas A&M and Fresno State. She represented Team USA at the 1996 Summer Olympics and won a gold medal. Smith most recently served as the head softball coach and assistant athletic director at the University of La Verne.

== Playing career ==
Smith was born in Glendora, California, and competed at the 1996 Summer Olympics in Atlanta where she won a gold medal with Team USA.

Smith played college softball at Texas A&M where she won a national championship at the 1987 Women's College World Series and Fresno State in the Big West Conference from 1990 to 1991. Along with a title, Smith was also named to All-Tournament team at the Women's College World Series in all three of her appearances.

== Coaching career ==
Smith served as the general manager for the New York/New Jersey Juggernaut in 2005. On August 3, 2007, Smith was named the head softball coach at the University of La Verne. On November 29, 2018, Smith stepped down as head coach after 11 years. During her career she compiled a record of 287–185 and led her teams to three SCIAC regular season championships, three SCIAC postseason tournament titles, and made the NCAA Playoffs four times.

== Statistics ==
Texas A&M Aggies & Fresno State Bulldogs

YEAR	G	AB	R	H	BA	RBI	HR	3B	2B	TB	SLG	BB	SO	SB	SBA
1987	62	222	46	80	.360	20	2	3	7	99	.446%	6	3	12	17
1990	77	263	55	93	.353	28	1	5	7	113	.429%	17	4	16	17
1991	68	235	47	85	.361	27	1	5	7	105	.447%	11	9	12	13
TOTALS	207	720	148	258	.358	75	4	13	21	317	.440%	34	16	40	47

Team USA Olympic Games
YEAR	G	AB	R	H	BA	RBI	HR	3B	2B	TB	SLG	BB	SO	SB
1996	9	21	2	5	.238	1	0	0	0	5	.238%	1	1	0
