= Jennifer McFalls =

American softball player and coach

Current position
- Title: Head coach
- Team: Kansas
- Conference: Big 12
- Record: 133–170 (.439)

Biographical details
- Born: November 10, 1971 (age 54); Arlington, Texas, U.S.

Playing career
- 1991–1994: Texas A&M
- 2001: WPSL Gold
- Position: Shortstop

Coaching career (HC unless noted)
- 1995–1997: Texas A&M (asst.)
- 1998: Oklahoma (asst.)
- 2003–2005: Hockaday School
- 2006–2009: Midlothian HS
- 2010–2018: Texas (asst.)
- 2015: Dallas Charge
- 2019–present: Kansas

Head coaching record
- Overall: 133–170 (.439)
Medal record
Women's softball
Representing the United States
Olympic Games
Gold medal – first place	2000 Sydney	Team competition

Jennifer Yvonne McFalls (born November 10, 1971) is an American, former collegiate All-American, gold-medal winning Olympian softball player and current head coach originally from Grand Prairie, Texas. She is head of the Kansas Jayhawks softball. team She played college softball at Texas A&M as a utility player and shortstop. She then went on to represent Team USA, being named an Olympic alternate in 1996 and a member of the 2000 team that won gold. After her years playing softball McFalls decided to become a coach with her first position as the assistant coach at Texas A&M. Mcfalls continued to coach for many years with several different schools at many different competitive levels. She was the head coach of the National Pro Fastpitch professional softball team, the Dallas Charge for their inaugural season.

== Early life ==
Born in Arlington, Texas and raised in Grand Prairie, McFalls began to play softball at the early age of eight. She was first introduced to softball though her family, as many family members had encouraged her to play. As McFalls came of age, she moved on to more competitive leagues within the Dallas and Fort Worth area. She started to play for a team called the Everman Shadows. In high school, McFalls was a multisport athlete. She played volleyball, soccer, and basketball. Softball was not offered at her school, so she could not play during her high school career. Although McFalls did play in the summer on a select softball team, this is where she was first recruited by Bob Brock at A&M University at the age of 16. McFalls graduated from South Grand Prairie High School in 1990.

== Collegiate career ==
At Texas A&M University, McFalls started at shortstop for Texas A&M Aggies softball from 1991 to 1994. She graduated from Texas A&M with a degree in kinesiology in 1997. While there, McFalls was a major component on the women's softball team. McFalls was an All-American shortstop and led her team in batting average all four seasons during her career at Texas A&M. She also led her team in hits, total bases, and slugging percentage. McFalls was named Texas A&M's Female Athlete of the Year in 1994. She was also elected to the Texas A&M hall of Fame in 2001. While at Texas A&M she received the awards for All American 1993, and All- South Region 1st Team during the years of 1993 and 1994.

== USA Softball ==
McFalls started out her Olympic career as the 1996 alternate soon after she became the world champion gold medal winner in 1998. In the following year, she was the Pan American Games winner. From 1994 to 2000, McFalls was a part of the U.S. National team. She played in several of the 2000 Olympic games. McFalls helped score the game winning run in the bottom of the eighth inning in the victory over Japan, winning 2–1. McFalls walked twice and scored two runs in the games overall.

== Coaching career ==
McFalls first began her coaching career as an assistant coach for three seasons at Texas A&M from 1995 to 1997 and one season at the University of Oklahoma, in 1997–1998. After her seasons at the collegiate level, McFalls went on to become the fastpitch softball academy director at Power Alley in Grand Prairie, Texas from 2002 to 2003. Shortly afterward, McFalls took an assistant athletic director and head softball coach position at Hockday School in Dallas, Texas. She spent two years at the school, from 2003 to 2005. McFalls was then offered a position at Midlothian High School, in Midlothian, Texas, where she became the head coach and assistant athletic director, compiling a record of 139–48 and leading her team to five consecutive playoff appearances. During her time at Midlothian High School, she was also a part of the USA Softball selection committee from 2005 to 2010 and served as the assistant coach for Team USA at the 2010 Canadian Open Fast Pitch International Championship.

McFalls then started to coach for Texas in 2010, as an assistant coach under head coach Connie Clark. In 2015, she was hired as the head coach for the National Pro Fastpitch team, the Dallas Charge. Clark resigned following the 2018 season, and McFalls did not return to the coaching staff.

On August 22, 2018, McFalls was named head coach at Kansas.

== Statistics ==
=== Texas A&M Aggies ===
YEAR	G	AB	R	H	BA	RBI	HR	3B	2B	TB	SLG	BB	SO	SB	SBA
1991	61	182	44	67	.368	26	1	4	9	87	.478%	21	12	9	10
1992	60	178	22	65	.365	27	2	7	14	99	.556%	19	6	7	9
1993	52	150	51	64	.426	40	5	8	13	108	.720%	25	4	11	12
1994	76	226	51	83	.367	33	3	5	12	114	.504%	26	9	17	20
TOTALS	249	736	168	279	.379	126	11	24	48	408	.554%	91	31	44	51

== Head coaching record ==
=== College ===
Record table
Season	Team	Overall	Conference	Standing	Postseason
Kansas Jayhawks (Big 12 Conference) (2019–Present)
2019	Kansas	15–36	3–15	6th	
2020	Kansas	13–13	0–0		Season canceled due to COVID-19
2021	Kansas	22–26	2–16	7th	
2022	Kansas	20–36	3–15	7th	
2023	Kansas	25–27	5–13	7th	
2024	Kansas	28-25-1	11–16	5th	
2025	Kansas	22-28	6-18	9th	
2026	Kansas	35-18	14-10	5th	
Kansas:		140–176 (.443)	33–87 (.275)		
Total:		140–176 (.443)			
National champion Postseason invitational champion Conference regular season champion Conference regular season and conference tournament champion Division regular season champion Division regular season and conference tournament champion Conference tournament champion
