= Kim Maher =

Vietnamese-American softball player and coach

Personal information
- Full name: Kim Ly Maher
- Born: September 5, 1971 (age 55) Saigon, South Vietnam
Medal record
Women's softball
Representing the United States
Olympic Games
Gold medal – first place	1996 Atlanta	Team competition

Kim Ly Maher (born September 5, 1971, in Ho Chi Minh City, Vietnam) is a Vietnamese-American, former collegiate All-American, Olympic champion, right-handed softball player and current Head Coach originally from Fresno, California. She competed in college for the Fresno State Bulldogs in both the Big West and Western Athletic Conference from 1991 to 1994, ranking in the latter for career batting average (.401) for her last two years and leading them in two semifinal finishes at the 1991 and 1992 Women's College World Series, being named All-Tournament for both events. Maher won gold at the 1996 Atlanta Olympics with Team USA. Maher is head of the SWOSU Bulldogs softball team.

== Career ==
She competed at the 1996 Summer Olympics in Atlanta where she received a gold medal with the American team.

Maher played NCAA Division I softball for the Fresno State Bulldogs. She is the former head coach of the Purdue University softball team. Maher resigned after her Boilers posted a 23–32 record during the 2013 season and failed to qualify for postseason play for the fourth consecutive season.

== Statistics ==
=== Fresno State Bulldogs ===
YEAR	G	AB	R	H	BA	RBI	HR	3B	2B	TB	SLG	BB	SO	SB	SBA
1991	68	223	34	59	.264	32	4	1	11	84	.376%	18	15	0	0
1992	68	208	34	67	.322	36	3	6	14	102	.490%	21	8	2	2
1993	62	189	44	72	.381	49	14	3	8	128	.677%	26	13	1	2
1994	65	202	50	85	.421	64	10	5	16	141	.698%	21	11	1	2
TOTALS	263	822	162	283	.344	181	31	15	49	455	.553%	86	47	4	6

Team USA Olympic Games
YEAR	G	AB	R	H	BA	RBI	HR	3B	2B	TB	SLG	BB	SO	SB
1996	9	32	7	7	.218	3	1	0	1	11	.343%	2	5	0

=== College ===
Record table
Season	Team	Overall	Conference	Standing	Postseason
Purdue Boilermakers (Big Ten Conference) (2006–2013)
2006	Purdue	30–30	7-12	8th	
2007	Purdue	33–32-1	10-9	T-5th	
2008	Purdue	35–23	9-9	4th	NCAA Regionals
2009	Purdue	31–20	12-8	6th	NCAA Regionals
2010	Purdue	27–27	8-10	5th	
2011	Purdue	30–18-2	8-9-1	5th	
2012	Purdue	31–22	13-10	T-5th	
2013	Purdue	23–32	8-15	9th	
Purdue:		240–204–3 (.540)	75–82–1 (.478)		
Southwestern Oklahoma State Bulldogs (Great American Conference) (2017–Present)
2017	SWOSU	18–33	12-29		
2018	SWOSU	13–38	13-38		
2019	SWOSU	21–33	20-24		
2020	SWOSU	4-16	3-9		Season cancelled due to the COVID-19 pandemic
2021	SWOSU	9–29	9–24		
SWOSU:		65–149 (.304)	57–124 (.315)		
Total:		305–353–3 (.464)			
National champion Postseason invitational champion Conference regular season champion Conference regular season and conference tournament champion Division regular season champion Division regular season and conference tournament champion Conference tournament champion
