= Michelle Venturella =

American softball player and coach

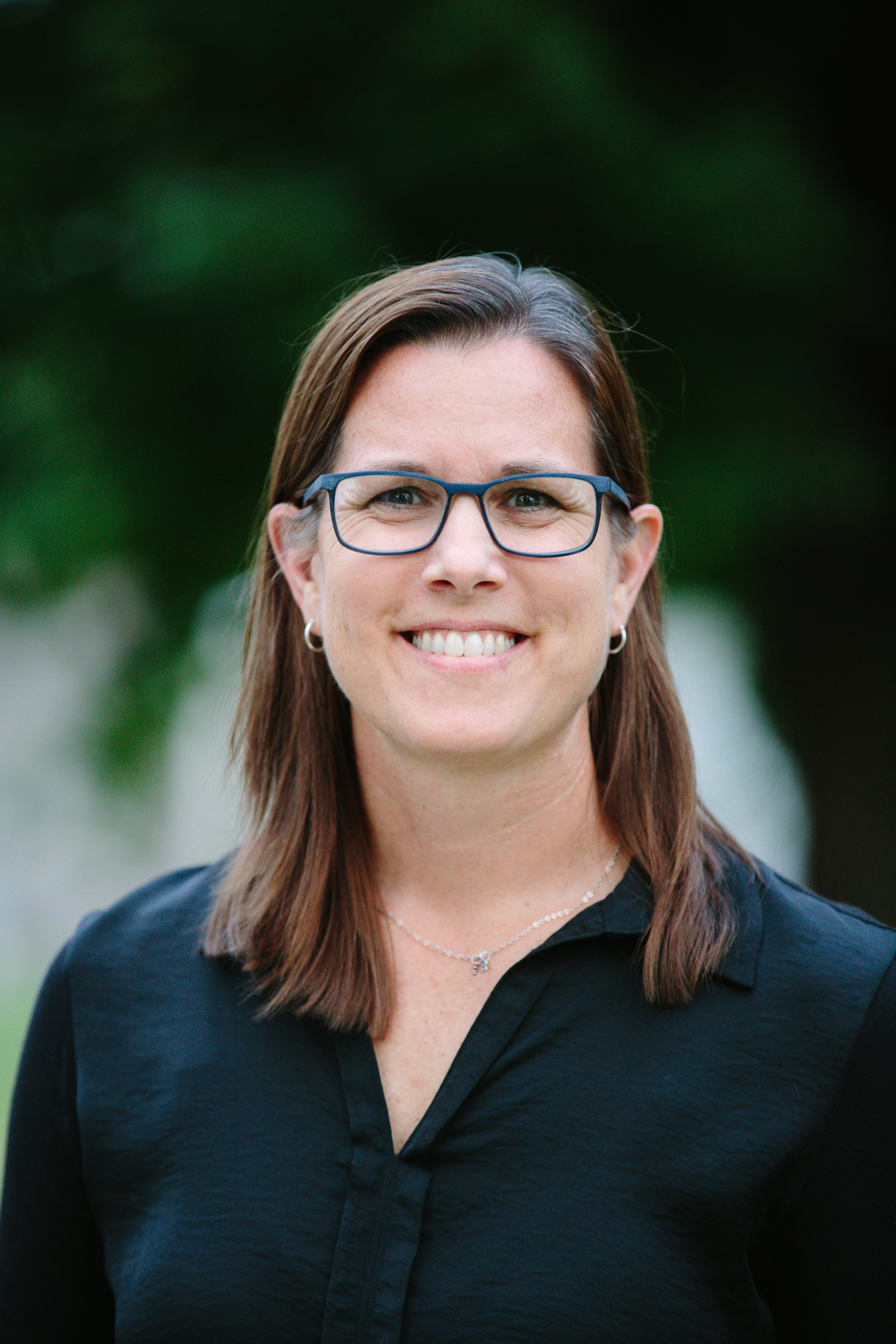

Biographical details
- Born: May 11, 1973 (age 53); Gary, Indiana, U.S.

Playing career
- 1992–1995: Indiana
- 1999: Durham Dragons
- 2001: WPSL Gold
- Position: Catcher

Coaching career (HC unless noted)
- 1997: Northern Illinois (asst.)
- 2003–2008: Iowa (asst.)
- 2009–2016: UIC
- 2017–2022: Washington University in St Louis

Head coaching record
- Overall: 238–233 (.505)
- Tournaments: NCAA Division I: 0–2 (.000); NCAA Division III: 1–2 (.333)
Medal record
Women's softball
Representing the United States
Olympic Games
| Gold medal – first place | 2000 Sydney | Team competition |

Michelle Ruether Venturella (born May 11, 1973) is an American, former collegiate All-American, gold medal-winning Olympian, left-handed softball player and former Head Coach. Venturella played for the Indiana Hoosiers in the Big Ten Conference, being named a three-time all-conference honoree and the 1994 Player of The Year. She later served as an alternate for the 1996 Olympics and then winning a gold medal at the 2000 Sydney Olympics for Team USA softball. She is the former head coach at Washington University in St. Louis.

== Career ==
She competed at the 2000 Summer Olympics in Sydney where she received a gold medal with the American team.

Ventruella played NCAA softball at Indiana University. She was the head coach of the Washington University in St. Louis softball team.

== Statistics ==
=== Indiana Hoosiers ===
| Year | G | AB | R | H | BA | RBI | HR | 3B | 2B | TB | SLG | BB | SO | SB | SBA |
| 1993 | 52 | 157 | 29 | 55 | .350 | 26 | 3 | 3 | 15 | 85 | .541% | 23 | 17 | 1 | 3 |
| 1994 | 65 | 182 | 57 | 76 | .417 | 65 | 16 | 4 | 17 | 149 | .818% | 56 | 19 | 4 | 5 |
| 1995 | 55 | 151 | 38 | 57 | .377 | 51 | 9 | 0 | 12 | 96 | .636% | 40 | 11 | 9 | 10 |
| Totals | 172 | 490 | 124 | 188 | .383 | 142 | 28 | 7 | 44 | 330 | .673% | 119 | 47 | 14 | 18 |
