= Sarah Dawson (softball) =

American softball player

Biographical details
- Born: January 22, 1975 (age 51); San Diego, California, U.S.

Playing career
- 1994–1997: Northeast Louisiana
- 1997: Orlando Wahoos
- 1999–2000: Akron Racers
- Position: Pitcher

Coaching career (HC unless noted)
- 1999: Marshall (assistant)
- 2000–2002: Louisiana–Monroe (assistant)
- 2003–2012: Louisiana Tech

Head coaching record
- Overall: 221–338

Accomplishments and honors

Awards
- Southland Conference Freshman of the Year (1994); 2× Southland Conference Player of the Year (1994, 1997); 2× Southland Conference Pitcher of the Year (1996, 1997)

Sarah N. Dawson (born January 22, 1975) is an American, former collegiate All-American, softball pitcher and head coach. She played college softball for Louisiana–Monroe and is the Southland Conference career leader in wins, strikeouts, shutouts, WHIP and innings pitched. She ranks top-10 all-time in NCAA Division I for career shutouts (9th) and innings (5th).

After graduating from college, Dawson played three years of professional softball for the Orlando Wahoos/Akron Racers. Dawson served as an assistant softball coach at Marshall and Louisiana–Monroe, before serving as the head softball coach at Louisiana Tech from 2003 to 2012.

== Early life ==
Dawson attended Christian High School San Diego in El Cajon, California, where she played softball for her mother, legendary California high school softball coach Roma Dawson.

== Playing career ==
She played college softball for Louisiana–Monroe team from 1994 to 1997. She is the Southland Conference career leader in wins, strikeouts, shutouts, WHIP and innings pitched and was named Southland Conference Freshman, Player and Pitcher of the Year during her career. She ranks top-10 all-time in NCAA Division I for career shutouts (9th) and innings (5th). After graduating from college, Dawson played three years of professional softball for the Orlando Wahoos/Akron Racers franchise of WPSL.

== Coaching career ==
While head coach at Louisiana Tech, Dawson compiled a record of 221–338, and led the Lady Techsters to a WAC conference championship and a berth in the 2008 NCAA Division I softball tournament.

== Statistics ==
=== ULM Warhawks ===
YEAR	W	L	GP	GS	CG	SHO	SV	IP	H	R	ER	BB	SO	ERA	WHIP
1994	27	19	51	45	36	15	1	332.2	210	70	40	41	290	0.84	0.75
1995	27	16	45	42	34	12	0	284.2	173	68	44	49	306	1.08	0.78
1996	21	11	33	32	31	16	0	224.1	144	38	25	28	238	0.78	0.76
1997	45	10	58	54	50	31	0	400.2	190	44	30	46	446	0.52	0.59
TOTALS	120	56	187	173	151	74	1	1242.1	717	220	139	164	1280	0.78	0.71

== Head coaching record ==
Record table
Season	Team	Overall	Conference	Standing	Postseason
Louisiana Tech Lady Techsters (Western Athletic Conference) (2003–2012)
2003	Louisiana Tech	16–42	6–14	5th	
2004	Louisiana Tech	27–33	10–11	4th	
2005	Louisiana Tech	18–49	2–16	7th	
2006	Louisiana Tech	18–31	6–11	6th	
2007	Louisiana Tech	22–38	3–15	7th	
2008	Louisiana Tech	37–29	7–10	4th	NCAA Regional
2009	Louisiana Tech	15–23*	9–8*	4th	
2010	Louisiana Tech	26–21	11–10	4th	
2011	Louisiana Tech	17–39	6–15	6th	
2012	Louisiana Tech	25–33	8–12	6th	
Louisiana Tech:		221–338 (.395)	68–122 (.358)		
Total:		221–338 (.395)			
National champion Postseason invitational champion Conference regular season champion Conference regular season and conference tournament champion Division regular season champion Division regular season and conference tournament champion Conference tournament champion

* Louisiana Tech vacated 19 wins (including 3 WAC games) in 2009 by NCAA action.
