= 2003 National Pro Fastpitch season =

2003 NPF Season
- League: National Pro Fastpitch
- Sport: softball
- Duration: June 5, 2003 - August 9, 2003
- Number of games: 23, and 1 rainout

NPF seasons
- ← 2002 2004 →

The 2003 National Pro Fastpitch season was the final year before the Women's Pro Softball League (WPSL) relaunched with league play in 2004. In November 2002, WPSL announced that it was taking a new name, National Pro Fastpitch, and that it would spend 2003 as a year of touring before resuming competitive play. From 1997 to 2002, the league operated under the names Women's Pro Fastpitch (WPF) and Women's Pro Softball League (WPSL).

The All-Star tour lineup visited 17 cities and partnered with a dozen Major League Baseball Clubs (Arizona Diamondbacks, Atlanta Braves, Boston Red Sox, Cincinnati Reds, Chicago White Sox, Colorado Rockies, Detroit Tigers, Florida Marlins, Houston Astros, Milwaukee Brewers, Minnesota Twins, and San Francisco Giants) for exhibition fastpitch games against local fastpitch teams, clinics and promotions.

After the tour, NPF held tryout camps, and their franchises conducted drafts to stock their rosters for the 2004 season.

== Schedule ==
Date	City	Location	Team	Result	Score
June 7, 2003; Doubleheader	Sacramento, CA	Shea Stadium (Sacramento State)	Northern California All-Stars	W	2-1
June 7, 2003; Doubleheader	Sacramento, CA	Shea Stadium (Sacramento State)	Northern California All-Stars	W	7-2
June 15, 2003	Minneapolis, MN	Jane Sage Cowles Stadium (Minnesota)	Minnesota All-Stars	W	8-0
June 18, 2003	Milwaukee, WI	Helfaer Field	Stratford Brakettes	L	5-2 (9 innings)
June 26, 2003	Boulder, CO	Stazio Field	Independence Day All-Stars	W	2-0
June 28, 2003	Westminster, CO	Christopher Four Plex	Fort Collins Force/TC Diamonds	W	6-0 (No-hitter)
June 28, 2003	Westminster, CO	Christopher Four Plex	Northern Illinois Lightning (Elgin)	W	17-0 (4 innings, no-hitter)
June 29, 2003	Westminster, CO	Christopher Four Plex	Fort Collins Triple Crown Buckaroos	L	1-0
June 29, 2003	Westminster, CO	Christopher Four Plex	Fort Collins Force/TC Diamonds	W	8-0 (Tournament Semifinal)
June 29, 2003	Westminster, CO	Christopher Four Plex	Fort Collins Triple Crown Buckaroos	W	9-1 (Tournament Final)
July 1, 2003	Fort Collins, CO	Triple Crown Center	Triple Crown Stars	W	6-3
July 6, 2003	Chattanooga, TN	Frost Field	East Cobb Bullets	W	2-0
July 10, 2003	Tempe, AZ	Farrington Stadium (Arizona State)	Arizona Majestic Stars	W	1-0 (9 innings)
July 11, 2003	Tucson, AZ	Hillenbrand Stadium (Arizona)	Arizona Majestic Stars	L	2-1
July 25, 2003	Akron, OH	Firestone Stadium	Ohio College Stars	W	5-1
July 26, 2003	Akron, OH	Firestone Stadium	Stiles Women's Fastpitch League All-Stars	W	13-0
July 26, 2003	Akron, OH	Firestone Stadium	Ohio College Stars	L	1-0
July 29, 2003 doubleheader	Lowell, MA	Martin Softball Field	Connecticut Classics	W	4-0
July 29, 2003 doubleheader	Lowell, MA	Martin Softball Field	Connecticut Classics	W	5-1
July 31, 2003 doubleheader	Lowell, MA	Martin Softball Field	Stratford Brakettes	L	1-0
July 31, 2003 doubleheader	Lowell, MA	Martin Softball Field	Stratford Brakettes	L	2-0
August 5, 2003	Klein, TX	Collins Field	Texas All-Stars	W	5-0
August 7, 2003	Sugar Land, TX	Imperial Park	Texas All-Stars	W	4-0
August 8, 2003	Pasadena, TX	Fairmont Park/Phelps Field	Texas All-Stars	Rained Out	

== Roster ==
The roster of the 2003 NPF All-Star softball team is listed below:

Name	Position	College	Hometown
Allison Andrade	SS	Arizona	Morgan Hill, CA
Lauren Bauer	OF	Arizona	Santa Ana, CA
Tarrah Beyster	P	Oregon State	San Diego, CA
Shauna Briggs	C/3B	Texas Tech	Sacramento, CA
Kara Brun	INF	Arizona State	Glendale, AZ
Lindsey Collins	C/OF	Arizona	Fountain Valley, CA
Danielle Cox	OF	Florida State	Anniston, AL
Jaime Foutch	1B/OF	Oklahoma State	Edmond, OK
Erika Hanson	OF/1B	Arizona	Thousand Oaks, CA
Lisa Iancin	INF	California	Covina, CA
Amy Kyler	P	Cleveland State	Marshallville, OH
Scia Maumausolo	C/DH	CSU Northridge	San Diego, CA
Venus Taylor	OF	Western Illinois	Quad Cities, IL

Head coach Tim Kiernan

Assistant coach Trina Salcido

== See also ==
- List of professional sports leagues
- List of professional sports teams in the United States and Canada
