= Patti Townsend =

American softball coach and former player

Current position
- Title: Head coach
- Team: Tallahassee CC

Biographical details
- Born: c. 1972 (age 53–54)

Playing career
- 1990-1993: Michigan
- 1998-1999: Georgia Pride
- 2000: Florida Wahoos
- 2001: WPSL All-Stars

Coaching career (HC unless noted)
- 1994-1995: Florida State (asst)
- 1996-2002: Tallahassee CC (asst)
- 2003–present: Tallahassee CC

Head coaching record
- Overall: 285-223(.561)

Accomplishments and honors

Awards
- NFCA first-team All-American, 1993; Big Ten Player of the Year, 1992, 1993; All-Big Ten first-team, 1991, 1992, 1993; WPSL MVP, 2000

Patti Townsend, formerly Patti Benedict (born c. 1972), is an American softball coach and former player. She has been a softball coach at Tallahassee Community College since 1996 and the head coach since 2003.

Townsend previously played college softball at the University of Michigan from 1990 to 1993, where she was a first-team NFCA All-American in 1993 and the Big Ten Conference Player of the Year in 1992 and 1993. She played professional softball for the Georgia Pride and Florida Wahoos and was named the Most Valuable Player in the Women's Professional Softball League in 2000. She also played for Team USA in 1995 and 1997 and was a member of the USA Team that won the gold medal in the 1995 Pan American Games.

== Early years ==
Townsend played high school softball in Allendale, Michigan. She holds the all-time West Michigan single-season record with a .700 batting average posted in 1989.

== University of Michigan and Team USA ==
Townsend played college softball for the Michigan Wolverines softball team under head coach Carol Hutchins from 1990 to 1993. She was selected as a first-team NFCA All-American outfielder in 1993, the Big Ten Conference Freshman of the Year in 1990, and the Big Ten Player of the Year in both 1992 and 1993. She was also a first-team All-Big Ten player each year from 1991 to 1993.

At the conclusion of her Michigan career, she held the school's career record for hits (244) and the single-season record for triples (11) and batting average (.421). She was the first Michigan player to hit over .400 and led the team in batting average for three consecutive years: .345 in 1991, .367 in 1992, and .421 in 1993.

Townsend played for Team USA in 1995 and 1997. She was a member of the 1995 team that won the gold medal at the Pan American Games in Parana, Argentina.

In 2002, Townsend was named to Michigan's all-time team upon the celebration of the program's 25th anniversary.

== Professional softball ==
Townsend played professional softball for the Georgia Pride (1998-1999) and the Florida Wahoos (2000) in the Women's Professional Softball League (WPSL). She also played for the WPSL All-Stars in 2001. In 2000, she led the WPSL in batting average (.330), helped the Wahoos win the WPSL championship, and was named the league's Most Valuable Player.

== Coaching career ==
From 1994 to 1995, Townsend was a graduate assistant at Florida State under JoAnne Graf. She joined the coaching staff at Tallahassee Community College as an assistant coach in 1996 and became the head coach in 2003. In 10 years as the head coach at Tallahassee, Townsend has compiled a 285-223 record (.561). She was named the Florida College System Activities Association (FCSAA) Gulf District Coach of the Year in both 2008 and 2011.

In 2011, Townsend led Tallahassee to a 41-22 record, the best in the school's fast pitch history. The team finished third at the NJCAA Division I Softball National Tournament. At the end of the 2011 season, Townsend and her Tallahassee softball coaching staff were named the NJCAA Division I South Region Coaching Staff of the Year by the National Fastpitch Coaches Association (NFCA).

== Personal ==
Townsend was married in 2002 to Jimmy Townsend. They have one daughter named Ali Townsend and live in Monticello, Florida.
