= Kellyn Tate =

American softball player and coach

Current position
- Title: Head coach
- Team: Puget Sound
- Conference: NWC

Biographical details
- Born: October 16, 1975 (age 51); Chesterfield, Missouri, U.S.

Playing career
- 1995–1998: Michigan
- 1998: Orlando Wahoos
- 1999–2000: Akron Racers
- 2001: WPSL All-Stars
- 2004: California Sunbirds
- Position: Outfielder

Coaching career (HC unless noted)
- 1998-2001: Penn State (asst)
- 2003-2006: Texas Tech (asst)
- 2006-2009: Miami (Ohio) (asst)
- 2010-2012: Portland State (asst)
- 2012–present: Puget Sound

Head coaching record
- Overall: 41–180 (.186)

Accomplishments and honors

Awards
- NFCA second-team All-American, 1998; NFCA third-team All-American, 1996; NFCA first-team All-Great Lakes Region, 1996, 1998; All-Big Ten first-team, 1996, 1997, 1998; WPSL batting title, 1999

Kellyn Marie Tate (born October 16, 1975) is an American softball coach and former outfielder. She has been the head softball coach at University of Puget Sound since 2012. She previously held coaching positions at Portland State, Miami (Ohio), Texas Tech, and Penn State.

Tate played college softball at the University of Michigan where she was a first-team All-Big Ten Conference player each year from 1996 to 1998. Her career batting average of .357 is the fourth highest in Michigan history. She later played professional softball for the Orlando Wahoos (1998), Akron Racers (1999-2000), WPSL All-Stars (2001), and California Sunbirds (2004).

== Early years ==
Tate is a native of Chesterfield, Missouri, a suburb of St. Louis. She played high school softball for Parkway West High School and led the team to consecutive state championships.

== University of Michigan and Team USA ==
Tate committed to play college softball at the University of Michigan in November 1993. She enrolled at Michigan in the fall of 1994 and was an outfielder for the Michigan Wolverines softball team under head coach Carol Hutchins from 1995 to 1998. She received honors as an NFCA second-team All-American (1998), NFCA third-team All-American (1996), NFCA first-team All-Great Lakes Region (1996, 1998), and All-Big Ten Conference first-team (1996, 1997, 1998). She was also a co-captain of Michigan's 1998 team. She helped lead Michigan to three Big Ten championships, four Big Ten Tournament titles, and four trips to the Women's College World Series.

She remains among Michigan's all-time career leaders in batting average (.357 - 4th), hits (272 - 7th), triples (12 - T-6th), sacrifice hits (48 - 3rd), and stolen bases (45 - 8th). Tate received a bachelor's degree in sports management and communications from Michigan in 1998. She later received a master's degree in higher education from Texas Tech in 2003.

Tate also played for the United States National Softball Team as a member of the national team from 1996 to 1997.

== Professional softball ==
Tate was drafted by the Orlando Wahoos in the 1998 WPSL Senior Draft. She played professional softball in the WPSL and National Pro Fastpitch for the Wahoos (1998), Akron Racers (1999-2000), WPSL All-Stars (2001), and California Sunbirds (2004). She had her best season in 1999 when she was runner up to the WPSL Hitter of the Year title with a .320 batting average, 56 hits and 19 extra base hits, but lost to Tampa Bay Firestix' Marty Laudato, who finished the 1999 campaign ranked in the top five in four offensive categories, including batting average (.311-2nd), home runs (8-2nd ), RBI (36-2nd) and slugging percentage (.480-4th).

== Coaching career ==
In July 2012, Tate was hired as the head coach of the softball team at the University of Puget Sound. In her first year at Puget Sound, the team compiled a 2-37 (.051) record.

Prior to taking over as the head coach at Puget Sound, Tate had worked for 14 years as an assistant coach at Portland State (2010-2012), Miami (Ohio) (2006-2009), Texas Tech (2003-2006), and Penn State (1998-2001).
