= California Sunbirds =

American softball team

- [[File: |frameless|class=pageimage|alt=]] Logo

Information
- League: National Pro Fastpitch
- Location: Stockton, California
- Ballpark: United Sports Complex
- Founded: 2004
- Regular Season championships: 0
- League championships: 0

The California Sunbirds were a women's professional softball team based in Stockton, CA. They were one of the founding members of National Pro Fastpitch in 2004. The team folded shortly after the 2005 season concluded.

== Franchise history ==
The California Sunbirds were originally named the Sacramento Sunbirds. Their agreement to play at Freedom Park at McClellan Park in Sacramento fell through, so they made arrangements to in Stockton at the United Sports Complex. After that, they changed their name to the California Sunbirds. However, they continued to use the URL https://web.archive.org/web/20100401111252/http://www.sacramentosunbirds.com/ for their team website.

The Sunbirds were coached by Tim Kiernan, one of the most prolific coaches in Northern California community college history. At Sacramento City College, Kiernan had won more than 800 games, three state championships, and a national championship.

In 2005, the Sunbirds only played a partial NPF season in 2005, losing all 16 games they played. There were hopes of returning to the league full-time in 2006, but it never happened and the team folded.

== Season-by-season ==
Season records
Season	W	L	T	Finish	Playoff results
2004	15	43	0	6th place National Pro Fastpitch	Did not qualify
2005	0	16	0	Played only a partial schedule, they were not included in NPF standings	
Totals	15	59	0		
