= Danielle Cox =

English footballer

Personal information
- Date of birth: 16 September 1992 (age 34)
- Place of birth: Keighley, England
- Height: 1.74 m (5 ft 9 in)
- Position: Defender

Team information
- Current team: Sassuolo

Youth career
- Doncaster Rovers Belles

Senior career*
Years	Team	Apps	(Gls)
2009–2011	Doncaster Rovers Belles	3	(0)
2011–2013	Blackburn Rovers	32	(1)
2013	Doncaster Rovers Belles	7	(0)
2014–2018	Sheffield FC		
2016	→ Preston North End (loan)	4	(0)
2018–2019	Sheffield United	19	(3)
2019	Celtic		
2019–2020	Durham	4	(0)
2020–2022	Pomigliano	21	(2)
2022–2023	Parma	22	(1)
2023–2024	Como	19	(0)
2024–2026	Parma	42	(4)
2026–	Sassuolo	0	(0)
- * Club domestic league appearances and goals

Danielle Cox (born 16 September 1992) is an English professional footballer who plays as a defender for Sassuolo.

== Career ==
Cox attended Oakbank School in Keighley and joined Doncaster Rovers Belles from there in 2009. After a spell with Blackburn Rovers, Cox returned to Doncaster in July 2013, signing a 15-month contract. On 30 July 2026, Cox joined Serie A Women side Sassuolo.
