= New York/New Jersey Juggernaut =

American softball team

- Logo

Information
- League: National Pro Fastpitch
- Location: Central Islip, New York
- Founded: 2004
- Folded: 2005
- Regular Season championships: 0
- League championships: 1 (2004)
- Colors: Navy Blue, White
- Ownership: Paul S. Plemenos, Michael Kafantaris, The Cowles Family (2004); John Schmitz (2005)
- Manager: Linda Derk

The New York/New Jersey Juggernaut were a women's professional softball team based in Central Islip, New York. They were founding members of National Pro Fastpitch and were founded in 2004. They were sold in 2005 and renamed the New York Juggernaut. The team folded shortly after the 2005 season concluded. In 2013, the second NPF franchise to represent the region was created called the New York/New Jersey Comets.

== Key players ==
- Erika Hanson
- Michele Smith

== Season-by-season ==
Season records
Season	W	L	T	Finish	Playoff results
2004	39	21	0	3rd place National Pro Fastpitch	Won 2004 NPF Championship
2005	31	14	0	4th place National Pro Fastpitch	Lost to Chicago in NPF semi-finals
Totals	70	35	0		

== Moments ==
27 Inning game vs. NE Riptide

== Players ==
- Kacy Clark
- Amanda Scott
- Erika Hanson
- Lyndsey Klein
- Courtney Scott
- Kelli Wilkerson
- Lisa Iancin
- Lauren Bauer

Achievements
New championship	Cowles Cup NPF Champions; NY/NJ Juggernaut; 2004	Succeeded by Akron Racers; 2005
