= Big Ten softball tournament =

American collegiate postseason softball tournament

- Sport: Softball
- Conference: Big Ten Conference
- Number of teams: 12
- Format: Single elimination
- Current stadium: Bittinger Stadium
- Current location: West Lafayette, Indiana
- Played: 1982, 1995–2008, 2013–present
- Last contest: 2026
- Current champion: Nebraska
- Most championships: Michigan (12)
- TV partner: BTN

The Big Ten softball tournament is the conference championship tournament in softball for the NCAA Division I Big Ten Conference. The winner of the tournament receives the conference's automatic bid to the NCAA Division I softball tournament.

== History ==
The Big Ten softball tournament began in 1982 and then took a hiatus until the tournament was reinstated in 1995. The tournament was held from 1995–2008 until the Big Ten switched back to using the regular season champion for the automatic qualifier to the NCAA tournament. The Big Ten reinstated the conference tournament in 2013 and has been held at the conclusion of the regular season ever since. Tournaments held in 1982 and 1995–2003 used a double elimination format. Tournaments from 2004 to 2008 and 2013 to present have used a single elimination format.

The inaugural tournament in 1982 included Indiana, Iowa, Michigan, Michigan State, Minnesota, Northwestern, and Ohio State, which were the only Big Ten schools with varsity softball programs at the time. Penn State started Big Ten play in 1992 after a few years of independence and playing in the Atlantic 10 Conference. Purdue began their program in 1995, followed by Wisconsin in 1996 and Illinois in 2001. Nebraska left the Big 12 Conference and joined the Big Ten for the 2012 season, and then Maryland and Rutgers came on board in 2015 from the Atlantic Coast Conference and the Big East Conference, respectively.

When USC, UCLA, Oregon, and Washington join the Big Ten Conference for the 2024–25 school year, UCLA, Oregon, and Washington will begin league play for the 2025 season. As of 2022, USC does not have a softball program nor any intention of starting one up after performing a study around 2002.

== Champions ==
=== By year ===
Year	School	Site
1982	Northwestern	Wilpon Complex • Ann Arbor, MI
1995	Michigan	Wilpon Complex • Ann Arbor, MI
1996	Michigan	Wilpon Complex • Ann Arbor, MI
1997	Michigan	Pearl Field • Iowa City, IA
1998	Michigan	Wilpon Complex • Ann Arbor, MI
1999	Minnesota	Wilpon Complex • Ann Arbor, MI
2000	Michigan	Pearl Field • Iowa City, IA
2001	Iowa	Wilpon Complex • Ann Arbor, MI
2002	Michigan	Wilpon Complex • Ann Arbor, MI
2003	Iowa	Pearl Field • Iowa City, IA
2004	Michigan State	Wilpon Complex • Ann Arbor, MI
2005	Michigan	Wilpon Complex • Ann Arbor, MI
2006	Michigan	Drysdale Field • Evanston, IL
2007	Ohio State	Buckeye Field • Columbus, OH
2008	Northwestern	Drysdale Field • Evanston, IL
2013	Wisconsin	Bowlin Stadium • Lincoln, NE
2014	Minnesota	Drysdale Field • Evanston, IL
2015	Michigan	Buckeye Field • Columbus, OH
2016	Minnesota	Beard Field • State College, PA
2017	Minnesota	Alumni Field • Ann Arbor, MI
2018	Minnesota	Goodman Softball Complex • Madison, WI
2019	Michigan	Andy Mohr Field • Bloomington, IN
2020	Cancelled due to the COVID-19 pandemic	
2021	Cancelled due to the COVID-19 pandemic	
2022	Nebraska	Secchia Stadium • East Lansing, MI
2023	Northwestern	Eichelberger Field • Champaign, IL
2024	Michigan	Pearl Field • Iowa City, IA
2025	Michigan	Bittinger Stadium • West Lafayette, IN
2026	Nebraska	Robert E. Taylor Stadium • College Park, MD

=== By school ===
School	Titles	Years won	First year in Tournament	Began Big Ten Play
Michigan	12	1995, 1996, 1997, 1998, 2000, 2002, 2005, 2006, 2015, 2019, 2024, 2025	1982	1982
Minnesota	5	1999, 2014, 2016, 2017, 2018	1982	1982
Northwestern	3	1982, 2008, 2023	1982	1982
Iowa	2	2001, 2003	1982	1982
Nebraska	2	2022, 2026	2013	2012
Michigan State	1	2004	1982	1982
Ohio State	1	2007	1982	1982
Wisconsin	1	2013	2000	1996
Illinois	0	–	2001	2001
Indiana	0	–	1982	1982
Maryland	0	–	2015	2015
Penn State	0	–	1999	1992
Purdue	0	–	1997	1995
Rutgers	0	–	2015	2015
Oregon	0	–	2025	2025
UCLA	0	–	2025	2025
Washington	0	–	2025	2025

== See also ==
List of Big Ten Conference softball champions
