= 2015 Michigan Wolverines softball team =

American college softball season

2015 Michigan Wolverines softball

Women's College World Series Runner-up

Big Ten Regular Season Champions Big Ten Tournament Champions
- Conference: Big Ten Conference
- Record: 60–8 (21–2 B1G)
- Head coach: Carol Hutchins (31st season)
- Assistant coach: Jennifer Brundage (18th season)
- Home stadium: Alumni Field

2015 Big Ten Conference softball standings
| | Conf. | | | | Overall |
| Team | W | | L | PCT | W | | L | PCT |
|---|---|---|---|---|---|---|---|---|
| No. 2 Michigan ‍†‍‡‍^{y} | 21 | – | 2 | .913 | 60 | – | 8 | .882 |
| No. 15 Minnesota ‍‍‍^{y} | 20 | – | 3 | .870 | 49 | – | 11 | .817 |
| Nebraska ‍‍‍^{y} | 17 | – | 6 | .739 | 35 | – | 23 | .603 |
| Northwestern ‍‍‍^{y} | 14 | – | 8 | .636 | 28 | – | 23 | .549 |
| Illinois ‍‍‍ | 14 | – | 9 | .609 | 26 | – | 27 | .491 |
| Ohio State ‍‍‍ | 12 | – | 11 | .522 | 30 | – | 22 | .577 |
| Rutgers ‍‍‍ | 11 | – | 12 | .478 | 29 | – | 20 | .592 |
| Penn State ‍‍‍ | 9 | – | 14 | .391 | 29 | – | 28 | .509 |
| Maryland ‍‍‍ | 9 | – | 14 | .391 | 27 | – | 27 | .500 |
| Iowa ‍‍‍ | 8 | – | 15 | .348 | 19 | – | 40 | .322 |
| Purdue ‍‍‍ | 7 | – | 14 | .333 | 31 | – | 25 | .554 |
| Indiana ‍‍‍ | 7 | – | 14 | .333 | 17 | – | 39 | .304 |
| Wisconsin ‍‍‍ | 5 | – | 17 | .227 | 21 | – | 31 | .404 |
| Michigan State ‍‍‍ | 4 | – | 19 | .174 | 19 | – | 36 | .345 |
† – Conference champion ‡ – Tournament champion y – Invited to the NCAA tournament As of June 5, 2015; Rankings from NFCA

The 2015 Michigan Wolverines softball team was an American college softball team that represented the University of Michigan during the 2015 NCAA softball season. The Wolverines, led by head coach Carol Hutchins in her thirty-first season, played their home games at Alumni Field in Ann Arbor, Michigan. The Wolverines finished the season with a 60–8 record, including 21–2 in conference play. The Wolverines won the 2015 Big Ten Conference softball tournament and qualified for the NCAA Division I softball tournament. They advanced to the finals of the Women's College World Series for the first time since 2005, where they lost to Florida.

== Preseason ==
The Wolverines were ranked No. 8 in the nation according to the USA Today/NFCA and ESPN.com/USA Softball preseason polls, becoming the top-ranked Big Ten school in both listings. Sierra Lawrence, Sierra Romero and Haylie Wagner were all named to the USA Softball Collegiate Player of the Year preseason watch list.

== Personnel ==
=== Roster ===
2015 Michigan Wolverines roster
| Pitchers: 3 Megan Betsa – Sophomore; 10 Sara Driesenga – Senior; 17 Haylie Wagner – Senior; Outfielders: 5 Olivia Richvalsky – Junior; 8 Nikki Wald – Freshman; 20 Mary Sbonek – Junior; 21 Kelly Christner – Sophomore; 22 Sierra Lawrence – Junior; Utility: 2 Aidan Falk – Freshman; 7 Kelsey Susalla – Junior; 23 Taylor Swearingen – Freshman; 24 Tera Blanco – Freshman; 32 Angie Danis – Freshman | Catchers: 14 Lauren Connell – Junior; 16 Morgan Swift – Freshman; 19 Becca Garfinkel – Senior; 25 Lauren Sweet – Senior; Infielders: 1 Abby Ramirez – Sophomore; 12 Amanda Vargas – Freshman; 18 Lindsay Montemarano – Sophomore; 32 Sierra Romero – Junior |

=== Coaches ===
2015 Michigan Wolverines coaching staff
| Carol Hutchins – Head coach – 31st year; Bonnie Tholl – Associate head coach – 13th year; Jennifer Brundage – Assistant coach – 18th year; Nikki Nemitz – Volunteer assistant coach – 4th year |

== Schedule ==
2015 Michigan Wolverines Softball Game Log
Regular season (48–6)
February (17–1)

| Date | Opponent | Rank | Stadium Site | Score | Win | Loss | Save | Attendance | Overall Record | B1G Record |
|---|---|---|---|---|---|---|---|---|---|---|
| February 7 | vs. No. 1 Florida | No. 8 | USF Softball Stadium; Tampa, FL | 1–2 | Ocasio (1–0) | **Wagner** (0–1) | — | 1,167 | 0–1 | – |
| February 7 | vs. USF | No. 8 | USF Softball Stadium | 4–3 | **Driesenga** (1–0) | Greiner (1–1) | — | 1,100 | 1–1 | – |
| February 8 | vs. Hampton | No. 8 | USF Softball Stadium | 9–2 | **Betsa** (1–0) | Babinsack (0–3) | **Wagner** (1) | 204 | 2–1 | – |
| February 8 | vs. Illinois State | No. 8 | USF Softball Stadium | 4–1 | **Driesenga** (2–0) | Romshek (2–2) | — | 217 | 3–1 | – |
| February 13 | vs. Western Kentucky | No. 7 | JoAnne Graf Field; Tallahassee, FL | 8–0 ^{(5)} | **Wagner** (1–1) | Kramer (3–1) | — | — | 4–1 | – |
| February 13 | vs. Georgia Tech | No. 7 | JoAnne Graf Field | 10–0 ^{(5)} | **Betsa** (2–0) | Kleinschmidt (0–4) | — | — | 5–1 | – |
| February 14 | at No. 6 Florida State | No. 7 | JoAnne Graf Field | 6–5 | **Wagner** (2–1) | Waldrop (4–1) | **Betsa** (1) | — | 6–1 | – |
| February 14 | at No. 6 Florida State | No. 7 | JoAnne Graf Field | 2–1 | **Betsa** (3–0) | Waldrop (4–2) | — | 1,208 | 7–1 | – |
| February 15 | vs. Georgia Tech | No. 7 | JoAnne Graf Field | 10–2 ^{(5)} | **Driesenga** (3–0) | Biggerstaff (0–1) | — | — | 8–1 | – |
| February 20 | vs. Lipscomb | No. 5 | Rhoads Stadium; Tuscaloosa, AL | 7–1 | **Wagner** (3–1) | Sanders (3–3) | — | 181 | 9–1 | – |
| February 20 | at No. 3 Alabama | No. 5 | Rhoads Stadium | 8–2 | **Betsa** (4–0) | Jury (3–2) | — | 2,514 | 10–1 | – |
| February 21 | vs. Lipscomb | No. 5 | Rhoads Stadium | 13–1 ^{(5)} | **Driesenga** (4–0) | Young (2–4) | — | 207 | 11–1 | – |
| February 21 | at No. 3 Alabama | No. 5 | Rhoads Stadium | 4–1 | **Wagner** (4–1) | Osorio (4–1) | — | 2,710 | 12–1 | – |
| February 22 | vs. James Madison | No. 5 | Rhoads Stadium | 10–0 ^{(5)} | **Betsa** (5–0) | Ford (2–2) | — | 101 | 13–1 | – |
| February 27 | vs. Toledo | No. 3 | Farrington Stadium; Tempe, AZ | 20–5 ^{(5)} | **Wagner** (5–1) | Gooding (4–2) | — | 289 | 14–1 | – |
| February 27 | at No. 21 Arizona State | No. 3 | Farrington Stadium | 7–5 | **Betsa** (6–0) | Ryndak (6–2) | **Wagner** (2) | 1,167 | 15–1 | – |
| February 28 | vs. Toledo | No. 3 | Farrington Stadium | 9–0 ^{(5)} | **Betsa** (7–0) | Gross (0–1) | — | 207 | 16–1 | – |
| February 28 | vs. Binghamton | No. 3 | Farrington Stadium | 15–0 ^{(5)} | **Wagner** (6–1) | Miller (2–2) | — | 209 | 17–1 | – |

March (14–4)

| Date | Opponent | Rank | Stadium Site | Score | Win | Loss | Save | Attendance | Overall Record | B1G Record |
|---|---|---|---|---|---|---|---|---|---|---|
| March 1 | at No. 21 Arizona State | No. 3 | Farrington Stadium | 6–2 | **Betsa** (8–0) | Macha (7–4) | **Wagner** (3) | 1,115 | 18–1 | – |
| March 4 | at Cal State Fullerton | No. 3 | Anderson Family Field; Fullerton, CA | 9–0 | **Wagner** (7–1) | Ybarra (5–5) | — | 945 | 19–1 | – |
| March 5 | vs. No. 22 Arizona State | No. 3 | Anderson Family Field | 0–2 ^{(8)} | Macha (8–4) | **Betsa** (8–1) | — | 345 | 19–2 | – |
| March 5 | vs. No. 1 Florida | No. 3 | Anderson Family Field | 4–7 | Ocasio (8–0) | **Betsa** (8–2) | — | 375 | 19–3 | – |
| March 6 | vs. San Jose State | No. 3 | Anderson Family Field | 9–1 ^{(5)} | **Betsa** (9–1) | Lang (4–4) | — | 1,042 | 20–3 | – |
| March 6 | vs. No. 9 Baylor | No. 3 | Anderson Family Field | 11–1 ^{(5)} | **Wagner** (8–1) | Stearns (4–3) | — | 511 | 21–3 | – |
| March 7 | vs. San Diego State | No. 3 | Anderson Family Field | 10–2 ^{(5)} | **Wagner** (9–1) | Cable (2–3) | — | 1,850 | 22–3 | – |
| March 14 | Kent State | No. 3 | Alumni Field; Ann Arbor, MI | 0–3 | Johnson (6–2) | **Wagner** (9–2) | — | — | 22–4 | – |
| March 14 | Kent State | No. 3 | Alumni Field | 10–1 ^{(5)} | **Betsa** (10–2) | Ladines (3–3) | — | 1,051 | 23–4 | – |
| March 15 | Kent State | No. 3 | Alumni Field | 4–1 | **Betsa** (11–2) | Johnson (6–3) | — | 1,021 | 24–4 | – |
| March 18 | Bowling Green | No. 4 | Alumni Field | 8–1 | **Wagner** (10–2) | Combs (1–3) | — | 712 | 25–4 | – |
| March 20 | at Ohio State | No. 4 | Buckeye Field; Columbus, OH | 13–1 | **Betsa** (12–2) | O'Reilly (7–2) | — | 215 | 26–4 | 1–0 |
| March 21 | at Ohio State | No. 4 | Buckeye Field | 13–1 ^{(5)} | **Wagner** (11–2) | DiDomenico (2–3) | — | 412 | 27–4 | 2–0 |
| March 22 | at Ohio State | No. 4 | Buckeye Field | 20–0 ^{(5)} | **Betsa** (13–2) | O'Reilly (7–3) | — | 388 | 28–4 | 3–0 |
| March 25 | Western Michigan | No. 4 | Alumni Field | 8–2 | **Wagner** (12–2) | Binkowski (3–6) | — | 659 | 29–4 | – |
| March 27 | Iowa | No. 4 | Postponed | | | | | | | |
| March 28 | Iowa | No. 4 | Alumni Field | 6–0 | **Betsa** (14–2) | Starkenburg (8–15) | — | — | 30–4 | 4–0 |
| March 28 | Iowa | No. 4 | Alumni Field | 7–4 | **Wagner** (13–2) | Yoways (2–10) | **Betsa** (2) | 1,136 | 31–4 | 5–0 |
| March 29 | Iowa | No. 4 | Alumni Field | 4–6 | Starkenburg (9–15) | **Betsa** (14–3) | — | 967 | 31–5 | 5–1 |

April (14–1)

| Date | Opponent | Rank | Stadium Site | Score | Win | Loss | Save | Attendance | Overall Record | B1G Record |
|---|---|---|---|---|---|---|---|---|---|---|
| April 3 | at No. 14 Minnesota | No. 4 | JSC Stadium; Minneapolis, MN | 1–9 ^{(6)} | Groenewegen (19–3) | **Betsa** (14–4) | — | 401 | 31–6 | 5–2 |
| April 4 | at No. 14 Minnesota | No. 4 | JSC Stadium | 9–4 | **Wagner** (14–2) | Anderson (5–2) | **Betsa** (3) | 1,119 | 32–6 | 6–2 |
| April 5 | at No. 14 Minnesota | No. 4 | JSC Stadium | 9–1 ^{(6)} | **Betsa** (15–4) | Groenewegen (19–4) | — | 327 | 33–6 | 7–2 |
| April 7 | Eastern Michigan | No. 4 | Alumni Field | 11–1 ^{(5)} | **Wagner** (15–2) | Rich (6–14) | — | 952 | 34–6 | – |
| April 10 | at Rutgers | No. 4 | Rutgers Softball Complex; Piscataway, NJ | 18–0 ^{(5)} | **Betsa** (16–4) | Landrith (11–6) | — | 157 | 35–6 | 8–2 |
| April 11 | at Rutgers | No. 4 | Rutgers Softball Complex | 16–3 ^{(5)} | **Wagner** (16–2) | Maddox (5–4) | — | 361 | 36–6 | 9–2 |
| April 12 | at Rutgers | No. 4 | Rutgers Softball Complex | 5–0 | **Betsa** (17–4) | Landrith (11–7) | — | 227 | 37–6 | 10–2 |
| April 15 | at Michigan State | No. 4 | Secchia Stadium; East Lansing, MI | 10–0 ^{(5)} | **Betsa** (18–4) | Rainey (1–9) | — | 1,047 | 38–6 | 11–2 |
| April 17 | Indiana | No. 4 | Alumni Field | 11–2 ^{(5)} | **Betsa** (19–4) | Olson (10–21) | — | 1,415 | 39–6 | 12–2 |
| April 18 | Indiana | No. 4 | Alumni Field | 3–0 | **Wagner** (17–2) | Olson (10–22) | — | — | 40–6 | 13–2 |
| April 18 | Indiana | No. 4 | Alumni Field | 7–1 | **Betsa** (20–4) | Tamayo (4–8) | — | 1,909 | 41–6 | 14–2 |
| April 19 | Indiana | No. 4 | Alumni Field | Postponed | | | | | | |
| April 21 | Michigan State | No. 4 | Alumni Field | 4–3 | **Wagner** (18–2) | Rainey (1–11) | — | 1,105 | 42–6 | 15–2 |
| April 22 | Central Michigan | No. 4 | Alumni Field | Postponed | | | | | | |
| April 24 | at Maryland | No. 4 | Maryland Softball Stadium; College Park, MD | 8–0 ^{(5)} | **Betsa** (21–4) | Dewey (6–11) | — | 512 | 43–6 | 16–2 |
| April 25 | at Maryland | No. 4 | Maryland Softball Stadium | 10–2 ^{(6)} | **Wagner** (19–2) | Schmeiser (18–8) | — | 941 | 44–6 | 17–2 |
| April 26 | at Maryland | No. 4 | Maryland Softball Stadium | 1–0 | **Betsa** (22–4) | Schmeiser (18–9) | — | 625 | 45–6 | 18–2 |

May (3–0)

| Date | Opponent | Rank | Stadium Site | Score | Win | Loss | Save | Attendance | Overall Record | B1G Record |
|---|---|---|---|---|---|---|---|---|---|---|
| May 1 | Penn State | No. 3 | Alumni Field | 8–0 ^{(5)} | **Betsa** (23–4) | Cummings (7–8) | — | 1,735 | 46–6 | 19–2 |
| May 2 | Penn State | No. 3 | Alumni Field | 9–1 ^{(6)} | **Wagner** (20–2) | Laubach (12–10) | — | 1,852 | 47–6 | 20–2 |
| May 3 | Penn State | No. 3 | Alumni Field | 10–2 ^{(5)} | **Betsa** (24–4) | Cummings (7–9) | — | 2,500 | 48–6 | 21–2 |

Postseason (12–2)
B1G Tournament (3–0)

| Date | Opponent | Rank | Stadium Site | Score | Win | Loss | Save | Attendance | Overall Record | B1GT Record |
|---|---|---|---|---|---|---|---|---|---|---|
| May 8 | Penn State (9) | No. 3 (1) | Buckeye Field | 16–1 ^{(5)} | **Betsa** (25–4) | Cummings (7–10) | — | 1,345 | 49–6 | 1–0 |
| May 9 | Northwestern (4) | No. 3 (1) | Buckeye Field | 9–0 ^{(5)} | **Betsa** (26–4) | Wood (16–10) | — | — | 50–6 | 2–0 |
| May 9 | Nebraska (3) | No. 3 (1) | Buckeye Field | 6–1 | **Wagner** (21–2) | McClure (9–3) | — | 1,476 | 51–6 | 3–0 |

Ann Arbor Regional (3–0)

| Date | Opponent | Rank | Stadium Site | Score | Win | Loss | Save | Attendance | Overall Record | Regional Record |
|---|---|---|---|---|---|---|---|---|---|---|
| May 15 | Oakland | No. 3 (3) | Alumni Field | 9–1 ^{(6)} | **Betsa** (27–4) | Kownacki (16–13) | — | 2,087 | 52–6 | 1–0 |
| May 16 | No. 19 California | No. 3 (3) | Alumni Field | 9–1 ^{(6)} | **Betsa** (28–4) | Trzcinski (15–6) | — | 2,237 | 53–6 | 2–0 |
| May 17 | Pittsburgh | No. 3 (3) | Alumni Field | 10–3 | **Betsa** (29–4) | King (20–9) | — | 2,144 | 54–6 | 3–0 |

Ann Arbor Super Regional (2–0)

| Date | Opponent | Rank | Stadium Site | Score | Win | Loss | Save | Attendance | Overall Record | Super Reg. Record |
|---|---|---|---|---|---|---|---|---|---|---|
| May 21 | No. 14 Georgia (14) | No. 3 (3) | Alumni Field | 10–3 | **Betsa** (30–4) | Wilkinson (28–10) | — | 2,136 | 55–6 | 1–0 |
| May 22 | No. 14 Georgia (14) | No. 3 (3) | Alumni Field | 7–6 | **Wagner** (22–2) | Wilkinson (28–11) | **Betsa** (4) | 2,582 | 56–6 | 2–0 |

Women's College World Series (4–2)

| Date | Opponent | Rank | Stadium Site | Score | Win | Loss | Save | Attendance | Overall Record | CWS Record |
|---|---|---|---|---|---|---|---|---|---|---|
| May 28 | vs. No. 6 Alabama (6) | No. 3 (3) | ASA Hall of Fame Stadium; Oklahoma City, OK | 5–0 | **Betsa** (31–4) | Osorio (21–9) | — | 8,360 | 57–6 | 1–0 |
| May 29 | vs. No. 7 UCLA (7) | No. 3 (3) | ASA Hall of Fame Stadium | 10–4 | **Wagner** (23–2) | Carda (32–7) | — | 9,425 | 58–6 | 2–0 |
| May 31 | vs. No. 8 LSU (5) | No. 3 (3) | ASA Hall of Fame Stadium | 6–3 | **Wagner** (24–2) | Hoover (18–7) | — | 9,274 | 59–6 | 3–0 |
| June 1 | vs. No. 2 Florida (1) | No. 3 (3) | ASA Hall of Fame Stadium | 2–3 | Ocasio (18–3) | **Betsa** (31–5) | Gourley (5) | 8,329 | 59–7 | 3–1 |
| June 1 | vs. No. 2 Florida (1) | No. 3 (3) | ASA Hall of Fame Stadium | 1–0 | **Wagner** (25–2) | Haeger (31–2) | — | 8,254 | 60–7 | 4–1 |
| June 1 | vs. No. 2 Florida (1) | No. 3 (3) | ASA Hall of Fame Stadium | 1–4 | Haeger (32–2) | **Wagner** (25–3) | — | 7,680 | 60–8 | 4–2 |

- Win
- Loss
- Postponement
- Bold: Wolverines team member
- Rankings from NFCA:
- (#) Tournament seedings in parentheses.

== Ranking movement ==
Ranking movement Legend: ██ Increase in ranking. ██ Decrease in ranking. NR = Not ranked. RV = Received votes.
| Poll | Last | Pre | Wk 1 | Wk 2 | Wk 3 | Wk 4 | Wk 5 | Wk 6 | Wk 7 | Wk 8 | Wk 9 | Wk 10 | Wk 11 | Wk 12 | Wk 13 | Wk 14 | Wk 15 | Final |
|---|---|---|---|---|---|---|---|---|---|---|---|---|---|---|---|---|---|---|
| NFCA | 10 | 8 | 8 | 5 | 3 | 3 | 3 | 4 | 4 | 4 | 4 | 4 | 4 | 3 | 3 | 3 | 3 | 2 |

== Awards and honors ==
Weekly Awards
| Player | Award | Date Awarded | Ref. |
|---|---|---|---|
| Kelsey Susalla | Co-Big Ten Player of the Week | February 23, 2015 | |
| Sierra Lawrence | USA Softball Collegiate Player of the Week | March 3, 2015 | |
| Sierra Romero | Big Ten Pitcher of the Week | March 9, 2005 | |
| Megan Betsa | Big Ten Pitcher of the Week | March 23, 2015 | |
| Megan Betsa | Big Ten Pitcher of the Week | April 20, 2015 | |
| Megan Betsa | NFCA National Pitcher of the Week | April 21, 2015 | |

Individual Awards
| Player | Award | Ref. |
|---|---|---|
| Megan Betsa | Big Ten Pitcher of the Year | |
| Carol Hutchins | Big Ten Coach of the Year | |

All-Big Ten
| Player | Selection | Ref. |
|---|---|---|
| Megan Betsa | First Team | |
| Kelly Christner | First Team | |
| Sierra Romero | First Team | |
| Haylie Wagner | First Team | |
| Sierra Lawrence | Second Team | |
| Abby Ramirez | Second Team | |
| Lauren Sweet | Second Team | |

All-American
| Player | Selection | Ref. |
|---|---|---|
| Kelly Christner | First Team | |
| Sierra Romero | First Team | |
| Megan Betsa | Second Team | |
| Sierra Lawrence | Third Team | |
| Haylie Wagner | Third Team | |
