= 2002 Big Ten softball tournament =

College softball tournament in Michigan

- Teams: 6
- Format: Double-elimination
- Finals site: Alumni Field; Ann Arbor, Michigan
- Champions: Michigan (6th title)
- Runner-up: Ohio State (1st title game)
- Winning coach: Carol Hutchins (6th title)

2002 Big Ten Conference softball standings
	Conf.						Overall
Team	W		L		T	PCT	W		L		T	PCT
No. 7 Michigan ‍†‍‡‍^{y}	15	–	3	–	0	.833	50	–	11	–	0	.820
No. 13 Ohio State ‍‍‍^{y}	16	–	4	–	0	.800	55	–	14	–	0	.797
Iowa ‍‍‍^{y}	12	–	4	–	0	.750	36	–	20	–	0	.643
Wisconsin ‍‍‍	11	–	6	–	0	.647	31	–	22	–	0	.585
Penn State ‍‍‍^{y}	10	–	9	–	0	.526	34	–	26	–	0	.567
Illinois ‍‍‍	10	–	9	–	0	.526	34	–	24	–	0	.586
Northwestern ‍‍‍	10	–	9	–	0	.526	24	–	18	–	1	.570
Minnesota ‍‍‍^{y}	7	–	8	–	0	.467	38	–	21	–	0	.644
Michigan State ‍‍‍	4	–	15	–	0	.211	24	–	35	–	0	.407
Purdue ‍‍‍	3	–	14	–	0	.176	33	–	26	–	0	.559
Indiana ‍‍‍	0	–	17	–	0	.000	13	–	31	–	1	.300
† – Conference champion ‡ – Tournament champion y – Invited to the NCAA tournament As of May 2002; Rankings from NFCA/USA Today

The 2002 Big Ten softball tournament was held at Alumni Field on the campus of the University of Michigan in Ann Arbor, Michigan. As the tournament winner, Michigan earned the Big Ten Conference's automatic bid to the 2002 NCAA Division I softball tournament.

== Format and seeding ==
The 2002 tournament was a six team double-elimination tournament. The top six teams based on conference regular season winning percentage earned invites to the tournament.

== Tournament ==
First round
4	Wisconsin	0
5	Penn State	3
3	Iowa	2
6	Illinois	3
4	Wisconsin	1
6	Illinois	2
3	Iowa	0
5	Penn State	6

Second round
1	Michigan	4
5	Penn State	3
2	Ohio State	5
6	Penn State	0
6	Illinois	3
5	Penn State	6

Semi-Finals
1	Michigan	5
2	Ohio State	0
2	Ohio State	4
5	Penn State	3

Finals
1	Michigan	2
2	Ohio State	1
