= 1998 Big Ten softball tournament =

College softball tournament in Michigan

- Teams: 4
- Format: Double-elimination
- Finals site: Alumni Field; Ann Arbor, Michigan
- Champions: Michigan (4th title)
- Runner-up: Iowa (3rd title game)
- Winning coach: Carol Hutchins (4th title)

1998 Big Ten Conference softball standings
	Conf.						Overall
Team	W		L		T	PCT	W		L		T	PCT
No. 6 Michigan ‍†‍‡‍^{y}	22	–	1	–	0	.957	56	–	7	–	0	.889
Northwestern ‍‍‍	15	–	9	–	0	.625	34	–	19	–	0	.642
No. 16 Minnesota ‍‍‍^{y}	14	–	9	–	0	.609	48	–	21	–	0	.696
No. 19 Iowa ‍‍‍^{y}	14	–	9	–	0	.609	38	–	20	–	0	.655
Michigan State ‍‍‍	11	–	13	–	0	.458	34	–	20	–	0	.630
Ohio State ‍‍‍	10	–	14	–	0	.417	33	–	23	–	0	.589
Penn State ‍‍‍	8	–	14	–	0	.364	21	–	28	–	1	.430
Purdue ‍‍‍	8	–	16	–	0	.333	29	–	30	–	0	.492
Wisconsin ‍‍‍	8	–	16	–	0	.333	19	–	31	–	1	.382
Indiana ‍‍‍	7	–	16	–	0	.304	13	–	31	–	1	.300
† – Conference champion ‡ – Tournament champion y – Invited to the NCAA tournament As of June 1998; Rankings from NFCA/USA Today

The 1998 Big Ten softball tournament was held at Alumni Field on the campus of the University of Michigan in Ann Arbor, Michigan. As the tournament winner, Michigan earned the Big Ten Conference's automatic bid to the 1998 NCAA Division I softball tournament. This was the last of four consecutive Big Ten softball tournaments that Michigan would win from 1995–1998.

== Format and seeding ==
The 1998 tournament was a four team double-elimination tournament. The top four teams based on conference regular season winning percentage earned invites to the tournament.

== Tournament ==
First round
1	Michigan	1
4	Minnesota	0
3	Iowa	5
2	Northwestern	2
4	Minnesota	6
2	Northwestern	0

Semi-finals
1	Michigan	0
3	Iowa	1
4	Minnesota	0
1	Michigan	4

Finals
3	Iowa	1	1
1	Michigan	6	5
