= 1999 Big Ten softball tournament =

College softball tournament in Michigan

- Teams: 5
- Format: Double-elimination
- Finals site: Alumni Field; Ann Arbor, Michigan
- Champions: Minnesota (1st title)
- Runner-up: Michigan (6th title game)
- Winning coach: Lisa Bernstein & Julie Standering (1st title)

1999 Big Ten Conference softball standings
	Conf.						Overall
Team	W		L		T	PCT	W		L		T	PCT
No. 16 Michigan ‍†‍‍^{y}	21	–	3	–	0	.875	51	–	13	–	1	.792
No. 22 Minnesota ‍‍‡‍^{y}	16	–	8	–	0	.667	48	–	20	–	0	.706
Penn State ‍‍‍	15	–	9	–	0	.625	35	–	22	–	0	.614
No. 14 Michigan State ‍‍‍^{y}	13	–	9	–	0	.591	41	–	23	–	0	.641
Iowa ‍‍‍	14	–	10	–	0	.583	46	–	26	–	1	.637
Wisconsin ‍‍‍	11	–	12	–	0	.478	29	–	21	–	0	.580
Northwestern ‍‍‍	11	–	13	–	0	.458	30	–	31	–	0	.492
Purdue ‍‍‍	9	–	14	–	0	.391	30	–	26	–	0	.536
Ohio State ‍‍‍	5	–	19	–	0	.208	20	–	32	–	0	.385
Indiana ‍‍‍	3	–	21	–	0	.125	17	–	40	–	0	.298
† – Conference champion ‡ – Tournament champion y – Invited to the NCAA tournament As of June 1999; Rankings from NFCA/USA Today

The 1999 Big Ten softball tournament was held at Alumni Field on the campus of the University of Michigan in Ann Arbor, Michigan. As the tournament winner, Minnesota earned the Big Ten Conference's automatic bid to the 1998 NCAA Division I softball tournament. This was the first Big Ten softball tournament championship for Minnesota.

== Format and seeding ==
The 1999 tournament was a five team double-elimination tournament except for the play-in game between 4th-seeded Michigan State and 5th-seeded Iowa. The top five teams based on conference regular season winning percentage earned invitations to the tournament.

== Tournament ==
Play-in Game
4	Michigan State	3
5	Iowa	5

First round
1	Michigan	8
5	Iowa	0
2	Minnesota	2
3	Penn State	1
5	Iowa	0
3	Penn State	1

Semi-Finals
1	Michigan	1
2	Minnesota	2
3	Penn State	0
1	Michigan	11

Finals
2	Minnesota	3	—
1	Michigan	2	—
