= 1982 Big Ten softball tournament =

College softball tournament in Michigan

- Teams: 7
- Format: Double-elimination tournament
- Finals site: Alumni Field; Ann Arbor, Michigan
- Champions: Northwestern (1st title)
- Runner-up: Michigan (1st title game)

The 1982 Big Ten softball tournament was the inaugural Big Ten softball tournament held at Alumni Field on the campus of the University of Michigan in Ann Arbor, Michigan, from April 16 to 17, 1982. Northwestern was the winner of the inaugural softball tournament.

== Format and seeding ==
The 1982 tournament was a seven team double-elimination tournament. All seven of the ten (at the time) Big Ten schools that put together a team earned invitations to the tournament. Illinois, Purdue, and Wisconsin did not participate, and would not field teams until 2001, 1995, and 1996, respectively.

== Tournament ==
Upper round 1 | Upper round 2 | Upper final | Final
Michigan | 5
Iowa | 1
Iowa | 2
Michigan State | 0
Michigan | 4
Northwestern | 6
Ohio State | 3
Minnesota | 2
Ohio State | 0
Northwestern | 4
Northwestern | 2
Indiana | 0
Northwestern | 4 | —
Michigan | 2 | —
Lower round 1 | Lower round 2 | Lower round 3 | Lower final
Indiana | 5
Minnesota | 6 | Iowa | 0 | Ohio State | 1
Indiana | 9 | Indiana | 2 | Michigan | 2^{(8)}
Ohio State | 3
Michigan State | 0
Ohio State | 5
