= 1996 Big Ten softball tournament =

College softball tournament in Michigan

- Teams: 4
- Format: Double-elimination
- Finals site: Alumni Field; Ann Arbor, Michigan
- Champions: Michigan (2nd title)
- Runner-up: Minnesota (1st title game)
- Winning coach: Carol Hutchins (2nd title)

1996 Big Ten Conference softball standings
	Conf.						Overall
Team	W		L		T	PCT	W		L		T	PCT
No. 7 Michigan ‍†‍‡‍^{y}	20	–	4	–	0	.833	51	–	14	–	0	.785
No. 19 Minnesota ‍‍‍^{y}	17	–	6	–	0	.739	43	–	18	–	0	.705
No. 4 Iowa ‍‍‍^{y}	17	–	7	–	0	.708	49	–	19	–	0	.721
No. 23 Indiana ‍‍‍^{y}	16	–	7	–	0	.696	37	–	24	–	0	.607
Michigan State ‍‍‍	14	–	10	–	0	.583	37	–	19	–	0	.661
Purdue ‍‍‍	12	–	11	–	0	.522	36	–	21	–	0	.632
Northwestern ‍‍‍	8	–	16	–	0	.333	19	–	33	–	0	.365
Ohio State ‍‍‍	6	–	18	–	0	.250	19	–	43	–	0	.306
Penn State ‍‍‍	5	–	18	–	0	.217	24	–	26	–	0	.480
Wisconsin ‍‍‍	3	–	21	–	0	.125	14	–	39	–	1	.269
† – Conference champion ‡ – Tournament champion y – Invited to the NCAA tournament As of June 1996; Rankings from NFCA/USA Today

The 1996 Big Ten softball tournament was held at Alumni Field on the campus of the University of Michigan in Ann Arbor, Michigan. As the tournament winner, Michigan earned the Big Ten Conference's automatic bid to the 1996 NCAA Division I softball tournament. This was the second of four consecutive Big Ten softball tournaments that Michigan won from 1995–1998.

== Format and seeding ==
The 1996 tournament was a four team double-elimination tournament. The top four teams based on conference regular season winning percentage earned invites to the tournament.

== Tournament ==
First round
1	Michigan	3
4	Indiana	1
3	Iowa	6
2	Minnesota	8
3	Iowa	2
4	Indiana	0

Semi-finals
1	Michigan	3
2	Minnesota	2
3	Iowa	0
2	Minnesota	3

Finals
1	Michigan	6	—
2	Minnesota	4	—
