= List of Michigan Wolverines head softball coaches =

The Michigan Wolverines softball program is a college softball team that represents the University of Michigan in the Big Ten Conference in the National Collegiate Athletic Association. The team has had four head coaches since it started playing organized softball in the 1975 season. The current coach is Bonnie Tholl, who took over the head coaching position in 2023.

== Key ==
General
#	Number of coaches (Note: A running total of the number of head coaches.)
GC	Games coached

Overall
OW	Wins
OL	Losses
OT	Ties
O%	Winning percentage

Conference
CW	Wins
CL	Losses
CT	Ties
C%	Winning percentage

Postseason (Note: Postseason play involving the NCAA Division I softball championship or AIAW Women's College World Series.)
PA	Total appearances (Note: Postseason appearances include seasons with NCAA Division I softball championship bids since the tournament began in 1982.)
PW	Total wins
PL	Total losses
WA	Women's College World Series appearances (Note: College World Series appearances include seasons with WCWS bids since the tournament began in 1969.)
WW	Women's College World Series wins
WL	Women's College World Series losses

Championships
CC	Conference regular season
CT	Conference tournament (Note: The Big Ten softball tournament began in 1982, but was not held from 1983–1994, or from 2009–2012.)
NC	National championships (Note: Women's College World Series sponsored by either the AIAW or NCAA.)

== Coaches ==
List of head softball coaches showing season(s) coached, overall records, conference records, postseason records, championships and selected awards (Note: Statistics correct as of the end of the 2026 NCAA Division I softball season.)
#	Name	Term	GC	OW	OL	OT	O%	CW	CL	CT	C%	PA	WA	CCs	CTs	NCs
1	Gloria Soluk	1978–1980	74	49	25	0	.662	—	—	—	—	—	—	0	—	0
2	Bob De Carolis	1981–1984	195	114	81	0	.585	25	27	—	.481	1	1	0	0	0
3	Carol Hutchins	1985–2022	2,173	1,684	540	5	.757	662	177	—	.789	29	12	22	10	1
4	Bonnie Tholl	2023–present	230	144	86	0	.626	50	42	—	.543	3	—	—	2	—
