= Sara Griffin =

American softball coach and former player

Biographical details
- Born: February 19, 1976 (age 49); Simi Valley, California, U.S.

Playing career
- 1995–1998: Michigan
- Position(s): Pitcher, third base, designated player

Coaching career (HC unless noted)
- 1999: Arizona State (asst.)
- 2000: Utah (asst.)
- 2009–2011: Loyola Marymount (asst.)

Administrative career (AD unless noted)
- 2002–2008: USC (Director of Compliance)
- 2008–2013: Loyola Marymount (Assoc. AD- Compliance)

Accomplishments and honors

Championships
- As player: 3x First Team NFCA All-American- Utility (1995, 1996,1998); Big Ten Suzie Favor Female Athlete of the Year 1998; 3× Big Ten regular season (1995, 1996, 1998); 4× Big Ten tournament (1995–1998); 2× Big Ten Player of the Year (1995, 1996); Big Ten Pitcher of the Year (1998); Big Ten Freshman of the Year (1995); High School CIF Player of the Year (1993); California High School Softball Player of the Year (1993); As an assistant coach: MWC regular season and tournament (2000)

Awards
- 3× first-team All-American (1995, 1996, 1998); 3× first-team All-Big Ten (1995, 1996, 1998)

Sara Griffin (born February 19, 1976), later known as Sara Webster, is a softball coach and former softball player and athletic compliance officer. While playing for the University of Michigan from 1995 to 1998, she was a three-time, first-team National Fastpitch Coaches Association All-American. She compiled a win–loss record of 106–19 at Michigan and concluded her collegiate career as the career leader in wins in the Big Ten Conference.

== Early years ==
Griffin grew up in Simi Valley, California. She played high school softball for Simi Valley High School. She was named CIF Player of the Year and California Player of the Year.

== University of Michigan ==
Griffin committed to play softball at the University of Michigan in October 1993. She enrolled at Michigan in the fall of 1994. She was a pitcher/utility player for the Michigan Wolverines softball team from 1995 to 1998. In four years with Michigan, she compiled a win–loss record of 106–19.

On March 8, 1996, she retired all 21 batters she faced for a perfect game against an Oklahoma team ranked No. 10 in the country. As a senior in 1998, she led the Big Ten Conference in wins (17–0), ERA (1.09) and strikeouts (88). Her overall record in 1998 (including non-conference games) was 35–3.

Griffin was selected as a first-team NFCA All-American in 1995, 1996, and 1998. In 1998, she became the first Michigan athlete to receive the Suzy Favor Big Ten Female Athlete of the Year Award. She was also selected as the Big Ten Conference Softball Player of the Year in 1995 and 1996. She was also named the University of Michigan's Female Athlete of the Year in 1996 and 1998.

Griffin was the 15th player in NCAA Division I history to pass the 100-win mark. During her career at Michigan, she set both Michigan and Big Ten Conference records for most wins in a career.

Griffin also excelled as a batter. She set Michigan records for career RBIs (184) and doubles (58) and still ranks among the top four in both categories. Her .384 career batting average remains the second highest in Michigan history.

Griffin graduated from the University of Michigan in 1998 with a bachelor's degree in communications. In 2002, she also received a master's degree in education (sports management) from Ohio State University.

In 2011, Griffin was inducted into the University of Michigan Athletic Hall of Honor. She was the fifth Michigan softball player named to the Hall of Honor, joining Penny Neer, Vicki Morrow, Alicia Seegert, and Jenny Allard.

== Coaching and compliance career ==
Griffin began a career as a softball coach. She has held coaching positions at Arizona State (asst. coach 1999), Utah (asst. coach, 2000), and Loyola Marymount University (asst. coach and associate athletic director for compliance, 2008–2013). From 2002 to 2008, she was the Director of Compliance at the University of Southern California. Griffin is a private instructor, working with kids in the Columbus, Ohio area.
