= 1997 Big Ten softball tournament =

College softball tournament in Iowa

- Teams: 4
- Format: Double-elimination
- Finals site: Bob Pearl Softball Field; Iowa City, Iowa
- Champions: Michigan (3rd title)
- Runner-up: Iowa (2nd title game)
- Winning coach: Carol Hutchins (3rd title)

1997 Big Ten Conference softball standings
	Conf.						Overall
Team	W		L		T	PCT	W		L		T	PCT
No. 5 Iowa ‍†‍‍^{y}	22	–	0	–	0	1.000	52	–	9	–	0	.852
No. 6 Michigan ‍‍‡‍^{y}	18	–	4	–	0	.818	51	–	14	–	0	.785
No. 24 Michigan State ‍‍‍^{y}	14	–	9	–	0	.609	47	–	22	–	0	.681
Purdue ‍‍‍	14	–	10	–	0	.583	41	–	25	–	0	.621
Indiana ‍‍‍	11	–	11	–	0	.500	27	–	21	–	0	.563
Minnesota ‍‍‍	10	–	13	–	0	.435	37	–	19	–	0	.661
Wisconsin ‍‍‍	10	–	13	–	0	.435	32	–	25	–	0	.561
Northwestern ‍‍‍	9	–	14	–	0	.391	19	–	31	–	0	.380
Ohio State ‍‍‍	4	–	18	–	0	.182	20	–	31	–	0	.392
Penn State ‍‍‍	2	–	22	–	0	.083	23	–	32	–	0	.418
† – Conference champion ‡ – Tournament champion y – Invited to the NCAA tournament As of June 1997; Rankings from NFCA/USA Today

The 1997 Big Ten softball tournament was held at Bob Pearl Softball Field on the campus of the University of Iowa in Iowa City, Iowa. As the tournament winner, Michigan earned the Big Ten Conference's automatic bid to the 1997 NCAA Division I softball tournament. This was the third of four consecutive Big Ten softball tournaments that Michigan won from 1995 to 1998.

== Format and seeding ==
The 1997 tournament was a four team double-elimination tournament. The top four teams based on conference regular season winning percentage earned invites to the tournament.

== Tournament ==
First round
1	Iowa	2
4	Purdue	0
3	Michigan State	0
2	Michigan	4
3	Michigan State	4
4	Purdue	2

Semi-finals
1	Iowa	2
2	Michigan	3
3	Michigan State	3
1	Iowa	4

Finals
2	Michigan	4	—
1	Iowa	2	—
