= 2000 Big Ten softball tournament =

College softball tournament in Iowa

- Teams: 6
- Format: Double-elimination
- Finals site: Bob Pearl Softball Field; Iowa City, Iowa
- Champions: Michigan (5th title)
- Runner-up: Iowa (4th title game)
- Winning coach: Carol Hutchins (5th title)

2000 Big Ten Conference softball standings
	Conf.						Overall
Team	W		L		T	PCT	W		L		T	PCT
No. 15 Iowa ‍†‍‍^{y}	14	–	4	–	0	.778	46	–	15	–	0	.754
No. 13 Michigan ‍‍‡‍^{y}	13	–	4	–	0	.765	45	–	16	–	1	.734
Penn State ‍‍‍^{y}	12	–	5	–	0	.706	38	–	19	–	0	.667
Northwestern ‍‍‍^{y}	12	–	6	–	0	.667	30	–	26	–	0	.536
Wisconsin ‍‍‍	9	–	6	–	0	.600	34	–	25	–	0	.576
Purdue ‍‍‍	6	–	10	–	0	.375	34	–	24	–	1	.585
Michigan State ‍‍‍	5	–	10	–	0	.333	30	–	23	–	0	.566
Indiana ‍‍‍	5	–	13	–	0	.278	33	–	28	–	0	.541
Minnesota ‍‍‍	4	–	13	–	0	.235	31	–	28	–	0	.525
Ohio State ‍‍‍	4	–	13	–	0	.235	28	–	26	–	0	.519
† – Conference champion ‡ – Tournament champion y – Invited to the NCAA tournament As of June 2000; Rankings from NFCA/USA Today

The 2000 Big Ten softball tournament was held at Bob Pearl Softball Field on the campus of the University of Iowa in Iowa City, Iowa. As the tournament winner, Michigan earned the Big Ten Conference's automatic bid to the 2000 NCAA Division I softball tournament.

== Format and seeding ==
The 2000 tournament was a six team double-elimination tournament. The top six teams based on conference regular season winning percentage earned invites to the tournament.

== Tournament ==
First round
4	Northwestern	2
5	Wisconsin	1
3	Penn State	4
6	Purdue	3
5	Wisconsin	1
3	Penn State	14
6	Purdue	1
4	Northwestern	2

Second round
1	Iowa	2
4	Northwestern	0
2	Michigan	2
3	Penn State	0
3	Penn State	3
4	Northwestern	1

Semi-Finals
1	Iowa	3
2	Michigan	1
2	Michigan	2
3	Penn State	0

Finals
1	Iowa	0
2	Michigan	2
