= Jenny Allard =

American softball player (born 1968)

Current position
- Title: Head coach
- Team: Pittsburgh
- Conference: ACC
- Record: 37–64 (.366)

Biographical details
- Born: 1968 (age 57–58); Irvine, California, U.S.
- Education: Michigan

Playing career
- 1987-1990: Michigan
- Positions: Third baseman Pitcher

Coaching career (HC unless noted)
- 1992-1994: Iowa (asst.)
- 1995-2023: Harvard
- 2024-Present: Pittsburgh

Head coaching record
- Overall: 725–582–4 (.555)

Accomplishments and honors

Championships
- 9× Ivy League Regular Season Champions (1998, 2000, 2001, 2007, 2011, 2012, 2018, 2019, 2023); Ivy League Tournament Champions (2023)

Jennifer Lynn Allard (born 1968) is a former All-American softball player at the University of Michigan and the current head coach of the University of Pittsburgh softball team. Allard played for the Michigan Wolverines softball team from 1987–1990, where she was named an All-Big Ten player four straight years. She was a third baseman as a freshman and sophomore and a pitcher as a junior and senior. In 1989, Allard was named the Big Ten Player of the Year and a nominee for the Honda-Broderick Cup. She has been the head coach at Harvard since 1995, where she led the Crimson to its first Ivy League championship in 1992 and has followed with three more Ivy League crowns. In 1997, Allard told her team that she was a lesbian, becoming one of the first major college coaches to openly announce her homosexuality. In 2008, Allard was inducted into the University of Michigan Athletic Hall of Honor.

== University of Michigan (1987–1990) ==
After graduating from Woodbridge High School in Irvine, California, Allard played softball for Hall of Fame coach Carol Hutchins at the University of Michigan from 1987-1990. She began at Michigan as a third baseman, but became a pitcher in her junior and senior years. As a freshman, Allard led the Wolverines with 26 RBIs, while hitting .331, second best on the team. She led the team in batting average in 1988 and 1989 and was named an All-American and Big Ten Player of the Year in 1989. She was also a four-time All-Big Ten Conference selection, earning Academic All-Big Ten honors as a senior. In 1989, Allard was also nominated for the Honda Broderick Award. She was the recipient of Michigan’s Conference Medal of Honor, an award given to the highest-achieving female student-athlete. Named to the Big Ten All-Decade team in 1992, Allard ranked in the top four all-time in 15 hitting and pitching categories at the time of her graduation from Michigan. In 2008, Allard was inducted into the University of Michigan Athletic Hall of Honor, only the fourth softball player inducted into the Hall (after Penny Neer, Vicki Morrow, and Alicia Seegert).

== Head coach at Harvard (1995–2023) ==
In 1992, Allard accepted a full-time coaching position as an assistant coach at the University of Iowa. In 1995, Allard accepted the head coaching position for the Harvard University softball team. She was the head coach at Harvard for 29 seasons, compiling a career record of 688-518-4. She holds a 334-123-1 record in the Ivy League. Harvard has won nine Ivy League softball titles in its history, all during Allard’s time as coach. Allard has also been Harvard’s coach during each of its four 30-win seasons and its eight NCAA Championship berths. She has coached 33 first-team All-Ivy League players selections, seven Ivy League Players of the Year, eight Ivy Pitchers of the Year and seven Ivy Rookies of the Year.

In 1998, Allard led Harvard to the best season in the history of the program, as the team recorded a 34-22 record, captured its first Ivy League championship with a perfect 12–0 league record and earned its first bid to the NCAA Championship, where it defeated Boston College in the regional. The Crimson was led in 1998 by Ivy Player of the Year Tara LaSovage and Pitcher of the Year Tasha Cupp.

In 2000, Allard’s team won its second Ivy League championship and NCAA tournament berth. The 2000 Crimson went 11-1 in league play. In 2001, Harvard again won the Ivy League title after posting an 11–3 League record. In 2002, the team had a 31-10 record in 2002, breaking the record set by the 1998 team, and winning the ECAC championship. In 2007, Harvard won its fourth Ivy League championship under Allard with a record of 31–15 record and a 14–6 record in the Conference. Harvard also won back-to-back Ivy championships in 2011 and 2012.

Allard earned a master's degree from the Harvard School of Education in 1999 and a master's in psychology from the Harvard Extension School in 2003.

== Head coach at Pittsburgh (2024–present) ==
On June 19, 2023, Allard was named the head coach of the Pittsburgh Panthers softball team.

== Personal life ==
In 1997, Allard told her team that she was a lesbian, becoming one of the first major college coaches to openly affirm her homosexuality. Allard made the announcement to her players in an email. "What I wrote," Allard recalled, "was something like, 'I know you'll potentially be stopping by my suite or calling, and I just want to let you know that my partner has decided to move on campus with me and you'll soon get the opportunity to meet her.'" She added, "I wanted to be very honest about how I was living and not be shamed or silenced by it. I ask and expect my athletes to be honest about things. They don't have to tell me everything, but if they are going to tell me something, I want them to be truthful. And because I want to model that, I couldn't tell them I'm hiding my partner behind the left field fence and I'm embarrassed to have them know her." Allard has spoken at conferences on the subject of homosexuality in athletics and has become an advocate for the rights of gay and lesbian athletes. "As a coach, I'd like to see increased dialogue among teams, and resources for gay athletes need to come more to the forefront," she said. "It's a big learning experience to have a gay athlete on the team."

== Head coaching record ==
Record table
Season	Team	Overall	Conference	Standing	Postseason
Harvard Crimson (Ivy League) (1995–2023)
1995	Harvard	28–14	9–3	2nd	
1996	Harvard	21–17	9–3	2nd	
1997	Harvard	32–19–1	8–4	2nd	
1998	Harvard	34–22	12–0	1st	NCAA Regional
1999	Harvard	20–18	10–2	2nd	
2000	Harvard	19–21	11–1	1st	NCAA Regional
2001	Harvard	22–23	11–3	T-1st	
2002	Harvard	31–10	12–2	2nd	
2003	Harvard	15–26	7–7	4th	
2004	Harvard	22–20–1	9–5	3rd	
2005	Harvard	18–20	9–5	3rd	
2006	Harvard	20–24	6–8	5th	
2007	Harvard	31–15	14–6	1st (North)	NCAA Regional
2008	Harvard	25–22	14–6	1st (North)	
2009	Harvard	27–17	12–8	2nd (North)	
2010	Harvard	27–23	17–3	1st (North)	
2011	Harvard	36–16	18–2	1st (North)	NCAA Regional
2012	Harvard	35–15	17–3	1st (North)	NCAA Regional
2013	Harvard	28–15–1	14–3–1	2nd (North)	
2014	Harvard	22–22	12–8	2nd (North)	
2015	Harvard	23–21	13–7	2nd (North)	
2016	Harvard	29–17	16–4	1st (North)	
2017	Harvard	22–19	13–7	1st (North)	
2018	Harvard	23–18	14–7	2nd	NCAA Regional
2019	Harvard	25–19	16–5	1st	NCAA Regional
2020	Harvard	2–8	0–0		Season canceled due to COVID-19
2021	Harvard	0–0	0–0		Ivy League opted-out of the season
2022	Harvard	22–20	15–6	2nd	
2023	Harvard	29–17–1	16–5	1st	NCAA Regional
Harvard:		688–518–4 (.570)	334–123–1 (.730)		
Pittsburgh Panthers (Atlantic Coastal Conference) (2024–present)
2024	Pittsburgh	17–32	6–18	T–12th	
2025	Pittsburgh	20–32	7–17	T–11th	
Pittsburgh:		37–64 (.366)	13–35 (.271)		
Total:		725–582–4 (.555)			
National champion Postseason invitational champion Conference regular season champion Conference regular season and conference tournament champion Division regular season champion Division regular season and conference tournament champion Conference tournament champion

== See also ==
- University of Michigan Athletic Hall of Honor
