= 2007 Big Ten softball tournament =

College softball tournament in Ohio

- Teams: 8
- Format: Single-elimination
- Finals site: Buckeye Field; Columbus, Ohio
- Champions: Ohio State (1st title)
- Runner-up: Northwestern (4th title game)
- Winning coach: Linda Kalafatis (1st title)
- MVP: Jamee Juarez (Ohio State)

2007 Big Ten Conference softball standings
	Conf.				Overall
Team	W		L	PCT	W		L	PCT
No. 23 Ohio State ‍†‍‡‍^{y}	14	–	2	.875	40	–	18	.690
No. 4 Northwestern ‍‍‍^{y}	15	–	3	.833	52	–	13	.800
No. 13 Michigan ‍‍‍^{y}	12	–	4	.750	47	–	13	.783
Iowa ‍‍‍	10	–	7	.588	37	–	21	.638
Penn State ‍‍‍^{y}	10	–	9	.526	36	–	23	.610
Purdue ‍‍‍	10	–	9	.526	33	–	32	.508
Illinois ‍‍‍	7	–	8	.467	30	–	25	.545
Michigan State ‍‍‍	7	–	10	.412	33	–	26	.559
Wisconsin ‍‍‍	6	–	12	.333	27	–	20	.574
Minnesota ‍‍‍	4	–	9	.308	24	–	22	.522
Indiana ‍‍‍	1	–	19	.050	21	–	34	.382
† – Conference champion ‡ – Tournament champion y – Invited to the NCAA tournament As of June 4, 2007; Rankings from NFCA

The 2007 Big Ten softball tournament was held at Buckeye Field on the campus of Ohio State University in Columbus, Ohio from May 10 through May 12, 2007. As the tournament winner, Ohio State earned the Big Ten Conference's automatic bid to the 2007 NCAA Division I softball tournament.

== Format and seeding ==
The 2007 tournament was an eight team single-elimination tournament. The top eight teams based on conference regular season winning percentage earned invites to the tournament.

== Tournament ==
Quarterfinals; May 10 and May 11
1	Ohio State	10
8	Penn State	2^{(5)}
4	Iowa	1
5	Purdue	4
2	Northwestern	4
7	Michigan State	0
3	Michigan	4
6	Illinois	0

Semifinals; May 11
1	Ohio State	10
5	Purdue	1
2	Northwestern	5
3	Michigan	2

Championship; May 12
1	Ohio State	2
2	Northwestern	1

== Schedule ==
Game	Time*	Matchup^{#}	Attendance
Quarterfinals – May 10 and 11
1	5:00 p.m.	#2 Northwestern vs. #7 Michigan State	
2	7:30 p.m.	#1 Ohio State vs. #8 Penn State	
3	12:00 p.m.	#3 Michigan vs. #6 Illinois	
4	2:30 p.m.	#4 Iowa vs. #5 Purdue	
Semifinals – May 13
5	5:00 p.m.	#2 Northwestern vs. #3 Michigan	
6	7:30 p.m.	#1 Ohio State vs. #5 Purdue	
Championship – May 13
7	12:00 p.m.	#1 Ohio State vs. #2 Northwestern	
*Game times in EDT. # – Rankings denote tournament seed.

== All-Tournament Team ==
- Designated Player: Katie Mitchell (Purdue)
- Utility Player: Jamee Juarez (Ohio State)
- Pitcher: Eileen Canney (Northwestern)
- Pitcher: Lorilyn Wilson (Michigan)
- Catcher: Sam Marder (Ohio State)
- First base: Garland Cooper (Northwestern)
- First base: Christina Douglas (Ohio State)
- Second base: Brittany Vanderink (Ohio State)
- Third base: Darcy Sengewald (Northwestern)
- Shortstop: Nycole Koyano (Ohio State)
- Outfielder: Katie Logan (Northwestern)
- Outfielder: Alessandra Giampaolo (Michigan)
- Outfielder: Courtney Pruner (Ohio State)

=== Tournament MVP ===
- Jamee Juarez (Ohio State)
