= Sierra Romero =

American softball player

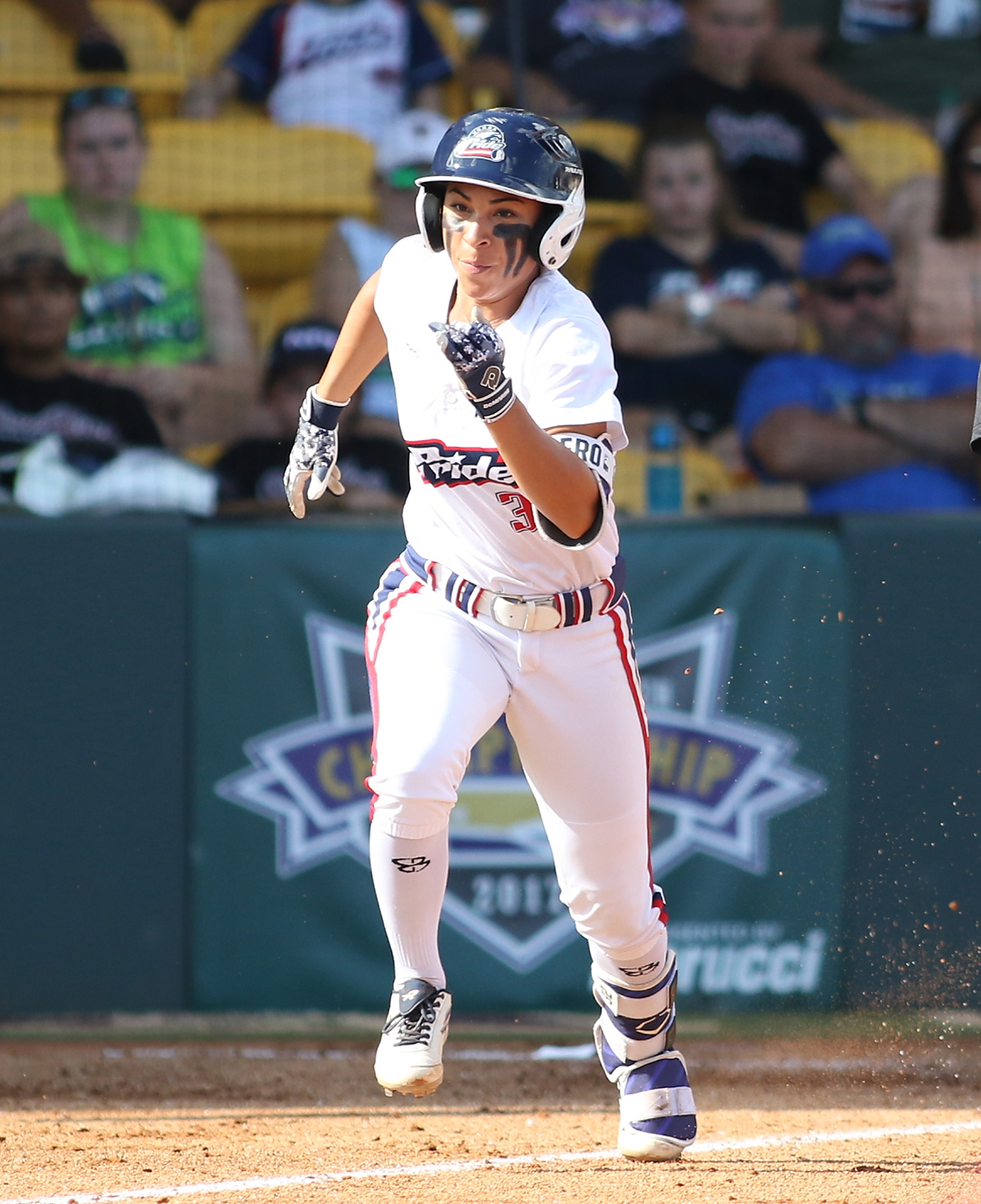
- Romero playing for the USSSA Pride in 2017

Biographical details
- Born: March 19, 1994 (age 32); Murrieta, California, U.S.

Playing career
- 2013–2016: Michigan
- 2016–2024: USSSA Pride
- 2025–2026: Texas Volts
- Position: Infielder

Coaching career (HC unless noted)
- 2019: Oregon (Volunteer asst.)

Accomplishments and honors

Awards
- 2× All-NPF Team (2017–2018); 3× Big Ten Player of the Year (2013–2014, 2016); Honda Sports Award Winner (2016); USA Softball Collegiate Player of the Year (2016); NFCA National Player of the Year (2016); 3× NFCA First-team All-American (2014–2016); espnW Softball Player of the Year (2015); 3× All-Big Ten First Team (2013–2015); Big Ten tournament MVP (2015); WCWS All-Tournament Team (2015); Big Ten All-Tournament Team (2014); Big Ten Freshman of the Year (2013); Inducted 2023 into the Michigan Sports Hall of Fame
Medal record
Women's softball
Representing the United States
Pan American Games
Silver medal – second place	2015 Toronto	Team

Sierra Joy Romero (born March 19, 1994) is an American former professional softball player. She most recently played for the Texas Volts of the Athletes Unlimited Softball League (AUSL). She previously was a volunteer assistant softball coach for the Oregon Ducks softball team. She played college softball for Michigan from 2013 to 2016, where she set numerous records and was a four-time All-American. She holds the Big Ten Conference career Triple Crown, along with the total bases and slugging percentage records, simultaneously leading all of the NCAA Division I in runs scored and grand slams.

She was the inaugural winner of both the espnW Softball Player of the Year in 2015 and the National Fastpitch Coaches Association Player of the Year in 2016, when she also took home the Honda Sports Award Softball Player of the Year and USA Softball Collegiate Player of the Year awards. She is one of nine NCAA players to hit .400 with 200 RBIs, 50 home runs and an .800 slugging percentage for her career and was named the #5 Greatest College Softball Player.

== Early years ==
Romero was born in 1994 and grew up in Murrieta, California. She attended Vista Murrieta High School and was ranked as the No. 3 prospect in the United States by ESPN.com. She graduated from Vista Murrieta in 2012.

== University of Michigan ==
=== 2013 season ===
As a freshman in 2013, she was selected as the Big Ten Player of the Year and the Big Ten Freshman of the Year, along with National Fastpitch Coaches Association Second Team All-American honors. Romero started all 64 games for Michigan at the shortstop position and set a Michigan single-season record with 23 home runs and ranked top-5 in RBIs and walks. She also set Big Ten Conference single-season records with 12 home runs and 34 runs scored in conference games. She was selected as the Big Ten Freshman of The Week seven times. For the NCAA, she ranked top-5 in RBIs, homers and walks for the year.

Debuting on February 8, Romero went 1/4 with a two-run double in defeating the Marshall Thundering Herd. Romero led the Wolverines to the Women's College World Series and on June 1, 2013, she hit a home run to best the Arizona State Sun Devils in a 2–0 victory as their only win at the series. Michigan softball coach Carol Hutchins at the time said of Romero: "The one thing she gives us is swag. She's got swag like no other."

=== 2014 season ===
In 2014, Romero once again earned honors from the NFCA (a first-team selection) and the conference. She appeared in 62 games for Michigan and compiled a career high and school best batting average and top-5 marks in home runs, bases on balls, on-base percentage (the latter two both career bests with the walks leading the NCAA) and 30 extra base hits; the overall hits total was also the best of her career. Along with these stats, Romero's RBI total also helped her earn a Big Ten Triple Crown. Romero collected three singles and hit a grand slam vs. the ULL Ragin' Cajuns on February 15 for a career highlight for base knocks.

=== 2015 season ===
In 2015, Romero, captured her third all-season honors, including the inaugural ESPNW's National Player of The Year. Romero appeared in 68 games for Michigan and achieved a career highs in RBIs (Big Ten record), slugging percentage and stolen bases, while ranking top-5 in school batting average, on base percentage, home runs, bases on balls, runs, with 35 extra base hits. She also amassed a second conference Triple Crown. For the NCAA, she ranked top-5 in RBIs and on base percentage.

On February 28, Romero drove in six RBIs with a three-hit, two-home run performance to defeat the Binghamton Bearcats for a career high. Romero hit two home runs on March 6 vs. the San Jose State Spartans to reach her career 50th, the milestone hit off Berlyn Rippentrop. The next month on April 18, Romero tallied her 200th career RBI on a two-run homer to help defeat the Indiana Hoosiers. On May 8, she set a new NCAA record with her tenth career grand slam home run.

The Wolverines entered the WCWS as the No. 2 seed and advanced into the championship series against the Florida Gators. In the finale, Romero batted in the only run in a 4–1 loss. She was named to the All-Tournament Team.

=== 2016 season ===
In 2016, Romero was awarded her third conference Player of The Year and First Team All-American honors. She was named USA Softball Collegiate Player of the Year, the inaugural NFCA National Player of the Year, along with winning the Honda Sports Award as the nation's best softball player in 2016. Romero appeared in 59 games with top-5 school batting average, on-base and slugging percentage, home runs, runs scored and walk stats. She ranked top-5 in NCAA categories for RBIs and home runs.

Beginning on February 21, Romero began a career high 18 consecutive game hit streak against the Virginia Tech Hokies and continuing to the Northwestern Wildcats on March 26 (hitting .518 29/56 with 34RBIs, 4HRs, 3B, 62Bs, 12BBs, 4Ks and slugging .875%). In the conference championship game, she set a new NCAA record for runs scored by hitting a home run in the first inning in an eventual loss to the Minnesota Gophers on May 14. Later she became the first college player to score 300 runs. Romero was just the fourth player and the first not playing for the University of Arizona to cross 300 career RBIs on May 20 vs. the Valparaiso Crusaders, with another first-inning homer. The Wolverines returned for a third trip to the WCWS with Romero but they were eliminated on June 5 by the Florida State Seminoles, Romero was shut out at the plate managing only a walk in her final appearance.

For her career at Michigan, the Wolverine set records for the highest career batting average in school history, 50 points ahead of Michigan's prior record holder, Traci Conrad. She also claims the highest career slugging percentage, more than 200 points ahead of Michigan's prior record holder, Samantha Findlay; additionally ranking 20 home run, 76 RBIs and surpassing Findlay's career walks total of 155. For the Big Ten, Romero tops the same stats except walks, which gives her the conference career Triple Crown, a rare feat. In the NCAA, she ranks first for her career runs and grand slams and top-10 in RBIs, slugging (4th), total bases (6th), home runs (8th) and walks (9th).

After the 2013 Women's College World Series, Romero played for the Team USA Junior Women's National softball team in the International Softball Federation Junior Women's World Championship. Romero started eight games at shortstop for Team USA, compiling a batting average of .500 in 22 at-bats with a .955 slugging percentage. She had ten RBIs, three doubles, two triples, and a home run in the tournament.

== Professional career ==
Romero was drafted second overall by the USSSA Pride in the National Pro Fastpitch 2016 draft. Following her rookie year, Romero was named to the All-NPF team in 2017. Romero missed the 2019 season due to a torn ACL sustained during a preseason exhibition game.

On January 29, 2025, Romero was drafted in the twelfth round, 45th overall, by the Volts in the inaugural Athletes Unlimited Softball League draft.

On July 18, 2026, Romero retired from softball.

== Coaching career ==
On August 15, 2018, it was announced that Romero joined the Oregon Ducks softball staff as a volunteer assistant coach.

== Personal life ==
She is the eldest daughter of Michael and Melissa Romero. She has three younger siblings; her youngest sibling Sophia, is also an aspiring softball player, her brother Mikey was drafted by the Boston Red Sox in the first round of the 2022 Major League Baseball draft, and sister Sydney, is an infielder for USSSA Pride. She is of Mexican and Chamorro descent.

On September 20, 2025, Romero engaged her partner Addison Caldwell.

== Statistics ==
Michigan Wolverines
YEAR	G	AB	R	H	BA	RBI	HR	3B	2B	TB	SLG	BB	SO	SB	SBA
2013	64	182	67	69	.379	71	23	2	11	153	.840%	49	28	6	8
2014	62	165	74	81	.491	72	18	1	11	148	.897%	67	16	9	9
2015	68	176	85	79	.449	83	22	2	11	160	.909%	58	8	21	25
2016	59	162	76	73	.450	79	19	1	11	143	.882%	52	12	15	17
TOTALS	253	685	302	302	.441	305	82	6	44	604	.881%	226	64	51	59

USSSA Pride
YEAR	AB	R	H	BA	RBI	HR	3B	2B	TB	SLG	BB	SO	SB
2016	111	18	37	.333	21	5	2	4	60	.540%	10	17	3
2017	129	19	36	.279	35	7	1	7	66	.511%	17	30	3
2018	99	23	39	.394	27	7	3	7	73	.737%	14	12	8
TOTALS	339	60	112	.330	83	19	6	18	199	.587%	41	59	14

== See also ==
- NCAA Division I softball career .400 batting average list
- NCAA Division I softball career 200 RBIs list
- NCAA Division I softball career 50 home runs list
