= Kelsey Kollen =

American softball player

Personal information
- Born: July 9, 1980 (age 45) Orange County, California, U.S.

Sport
- Sport: Softball
- Position: Second base
- College team: Michigan Wolverines (1999-2002)

Kelsey Elizabeth Kollen (born July 9, 1980) is a former American softball player. She played college softball for the Michigan Wolverines softball team from 1999 to 2002. She was selected as the Big Ten Conference Freshman of the Year in 1999 and a first-team NFCA All-American in 2002. She was also selected as the first-team All-Big Ten second baseman in 1999, 2001, and 2002. She is married to former Major League Baseball relief pitcher J. J. Putz.

== Early years ==
Kollen was born in Orange County, California and raised in Cerritos. She was recognized as California's freshman and sophomore player of the year while in high school. She was also an All-California player as a junior and senior. She played on Amateur Softball Association teams that won two national championships. She played high school softball for Mater Dei High School in Santa Ana, California, and set the California Southern Section records for hits in a season and a career.

== University of Michigan ==
In November 1997, Kollen-Putz orally committed to attend the University of Michigan on a softball scholarship. She enrolled at Michigan in the fall of 1998 and played college softball under head coach Carol Hutchins from 1999 to 2002. She was Michigan's starting second baseman all four years.

As a freshman in 1999, Kollen-Putz tied Michigan's single-season record with 89 hits. She was named a first-team All-Big Ten Conference player and the Big Ten Freshman of the Year. She was also a second-team NFCA All-American at second base.

As a junior in 2001, Kollen-Putz led the Wolverines with 85 hits and 45 runs scored. She was selected as the first-team NFCA All-American at second base and received her second first-team All-Big Ten team recognition.

As a senior in 2002, she was Michigan's co-captain. She received her third first-team All-Big Ten team award. She was also a finalist for USA Softball's first College Softball Player of the Year award. During the 2002 NCAA Regional 6 Tournament, she compiled a .615 batting average and was named the tournament MVP.

Kollen ranks among Michigan's all-time career leaders with 298 hits (2nd), 56 stolen bases (3rd), 187 runs (5th), and 852 at bats (3rd).

== Personal ==
After graduating from Michigan in 2002, Kollen-Putz married Major League Baseball pitcher J. J. Putz. The two met while both were student-athletes at the University of Michigan.
