= Kelly Kovach Schoenly =

American softball player and coach

Playing career
- 1992–1995: Michigan
- Position: Pitcher

Coaching career (HC unless noted)
- 1996–1998: Michigan (asst.)
- 1999–2006: Penn State (asst.)
- 2007–2012: Miami (Ohio)
- 2013–2024: Ohio State

Head coaching record
- Overall: 555–379–2 (.594)

Accomplishments and honors

Championships
- MAC Tournament Champions (2009, 2012)

Awards
- Winningest coach in Miami (Ohio) softball history WPIAL Hall of Fame (2012)

Kelly Kovach Schoenly is an American softball coach and former softball player. She was the head softball coach at Ohio State from June 2012 to May 2024. She previously served as the head softball coach at Miami (Ohio) from 2006 to 2012. She has also been an assistant coach at Michigan and Penn State.

Kovach Schoenly played college softball at the University of Michigan from 1992 to 1995. She was selected as a first-team NFCA All-American in 1995 and a CoSIDA Academic All-American for 1994–1995. She was also named the Big Ten Conference Freshman of the Year in 1992 and Big Ten Conference Pitcher of the Year in 1992 and 1995.

== Early years ==
Kovach Schoenly grew up in western Pennsylvania and played softball, basketball and volleyball at Baldwin High School in suburban Pittsburgh. In 2012, she was inducted into the Western Pennsylvania Interscholastic Athletic League Hall of Fame.

== University of Michigan ==
Kovach Schoenly played college softball at the University of Michigan from 1992 to 1995. In four years at Michigan, she appeared in 142 games, including 112 starts (ranking 4th in Michigan history in both categories). She ranks among Michigan's all-time leaders in career wins (72 -7th), career strikeouts (465 – 7th), career shutouts (33 – 6th), innings pitched (769.0 – 4th), and career complete games (81 – 6th). She was selected as a first-team NFCA All-American in 1995 and a CoSIDA Academic All-American for 1994–1995. She was named the Big Ten Conference Freshman of the Year in 1992 and Big Ten Conference Pitcher of the Year in 1992 and 1995. She was also a co-captain of Michigan's 1995 softball team.

Kovach was also a solid batter in college. On April 1, 1995, she hit a grand slam against Indiana, only the second grand slam in Michigan softball history. She also had 61 RBIs and 21 doubles in 1995, both of which were Michigan single-season records at the time.

Kovach received a bachelor's degree in elementary education from Michigan in 1995. She also received a master's degree in elementary mathematics education from Michigan in 1998.

== Coaching career ==
Kovach Schoenly was encouraged to pursue coaching rather than elementary education by her collegiate coach at Michigan, Carol Hutchins. She began her coaching career as an assistant coach at Michigan from 1995 to 1998. The Wolverines advanced to the Women's College World Series in all three years while Schoenly was an assistant coach.

From 1998 to 2006, Schoenly was an assistant softball coach at Penn State. During her eight years at Penn State, the softball team received six NCAA Tournament berths.

In 2006, on the recommendation of Michigan head coach Carol Hutchins, Kovach Schoenly was hired as the head softball coach at Miami (Ohio). She was the head coach at Miami from 2006 to 2012 and compiled a 188–152–1 in six seasons at Miami. She is Miami's all-time winningest coach with 188 career victories. Her teams at Miami won two MAC tournament titles (2009 and 2012) and also received two NCAA Tournament berths (2009 and 2012).

In June 2012, she was named head softball coach at Ohio State. In her first season at Ohio State, she led the Buckeyes to a 34–22 record.

On May 13, 2024, Ohio State parted ways with Kovach-Schoenly after a 31–20 season.

== Personal ==
Kovach Schoenly is married to tennis pro Doug Schoenly. They have a daughter, Danielle.

== Head coaching record ==
Record table
Season	Team	Overall	Conference	Standing	Postseason
Miami RedHawks (Mid-American Conference) (2007–2012)
2007	Miami	26–35–1	14–8	3rd (East)	
2008	Miami	23–27	13–9	3rd (East)	
2009	Miami	33–24	13–9	2nd (East)	NCAA Regional
2010	Miami	33–24	14–8	2nd (East)	
2011	Miami	32–22	13–9	2nd (East)	
2012	Miami	41–21	16–6	1st (East)	NCAA Regional
Miami:		188–153–1 (.551)	83–49 (.629)		
Ohio State Buckeyes (Big Ten Conference) (2013–2024)
2013	Ohio State	34–22	10–13	8th	
2014	Ohio State	30–25	13–10	T-6th	
2015	Ohio State	30–22	12–11	6th	
2016	Ohio State	34–20–1	13–9–1	6th	NCAA Regional
2017	Ohio State	35–18	15–8	3rd	NCAA Regional
2018	Ohio State	36–16	14–8	T-4th	NCAA Regional
2019	Ohio State	35–18	17–6	4th	NCAA Regional
2020	Ohio State	9–9	0–0		Season cancelled due to COVID-19
2021	Ohio State	24–19	24–19	6th	
2022	Ohio State	36–17	13–9	6th	NCAA Regional
2023	Ohio State	33–20	12–11	6th	
2024	Ohio State	31–20	12–11	T–6th	
Ohio State:		367–226–1 (.619)	155–115–1 (.574)		
Total:		555–379–2 (.594)			
National champion Postseason invitational champion Conference regular season champion Conference regular season and conference tournament champion Division regular season champion Division regular season and conference tournament champion Conference tournament champion
