= Big Ten Conference Softball Freshman of the Year =

Big Ten Conference Freshman of the Year
- Awarded for: the most outstanding college softball freshman in the Big Ten Conference
- Country: United States

History
- First award: 1985
- Most recent: Alexis Jensen, Nebraska

The Big Ten Conference Freshman of the Year is a college softball award given to the Big Ten Conference's most outstanding freshman. The award has been given annually since 1985.

== Winners ==
Season	Player	School	Position	Reference
1985	Tammy Connor	Indiana	OF	
1986	Ndidi Opia	Northwestern	OF/P	
1987	Chinazo Opia	Northwestern	P/U	
1988	Brenda Bixby	Minnesota	P	
1989	Terri McFarland	Iowa	P	
1990	Patti Benedict	Michigan	OF	
1991	Karren Jackson	Iowa	P	
1992	Kelly Kovach	Michigan	P	
1993	Tracy Carr	Michigan	U	
1994	Kari Knopf	Iowa	IF	
1995	Sara Griffin	Michigan	U	
1996	Traci Conrad	Michigan	1B	
1997	Melissa Gentile	Michigan	3B	
1998	Brooke Siebel	Northwestern	U	
1999	Kelsey Kollen	Michigan	2B	
2000	Jessica Bashor	Iowa	C	
2001	Wendy Allen	Ohio State	U	
2002	Nicole Motycka	Michigan	P	
2003	Stacy May	Iowa	P/3B	
2004	Eileen Canney	Northwestern	P	
2005	Samantha Findlay	Michigan	1B	
2006	Tammy Williams	Northwestern	SS	
2007	Nicole Pauly	Northwestern	2B	
2008	Jordan Taylor	Michigan	P	
2009	Adrienne Monka	Northwestern	1B	
2010	Melanie Nichols	Ohio State	P	
2011	Sara Moulton	Minnesota	P	
2012	Haylie Wagner	Michigan	P	
2013	Sierra Romero	Michigan	SS	
2014	Sara Groenewegen	Minnesota	P	
2015	Sabrina Rabin	Northwestern	OF	
2016	Maddie Houlihan	Minnesota	U	
2017	Kendyl Lindaman	Minnesota	C	
2018	Meghan Beaubien	Michigan	P	
2019	Danielle Williams	Northwestern	P	
2021	Jaeda McFarland	Maryland	OF	
2022	Ava Bredwell	Nebraska	C	
2023	Taryn Kern	Indiana	2B	
2024	Bridget Nemeth	Penn State	P	
2025	Alexis DeBoer	Washington	1B	
2026	Alexis Jensen	Nebraska	P / UTL	

== Winners by school ==
School	Winners	Years
Michigan	13	1990, 1992, 1993, 1995, 1996, 1997, 1999, 2002, 2005, 2008, 2012, 2013, 2018
Northwestern	9	1986, 1987, 1998, 2004, 2006, 2007, 2009, 2015, 2019
Iowa	5	1989, 1991, 1994, 2000, 2003
Minnesota	5	1988, 2011, 2014, 2016, 2017
Indiana	2	1985, 2023
Nebraska	2	2022, 2026
Ohio State	2	2001, 2010
Maryland	1	2021
Penn State	1	2024
Washington	1	2025
Illinois	0	—
Michigan State	0	—
Oregon	0	—
Purdue	0	—
Rutgers	0	—
UCLA	0	—
Wisconsin	0	—
