= Seegert =

Seegert is a surname of German origin. Notable people with the surname include:

- Alicia Seegert (born 1965), American softball player
- Marcel Seegert (born 1994), German footballer
- Nolan Seegert (born 1992), German pair skater
