= Alexis Jensen =

American softball player

Nebraska Cornhuskers – No. 99
- Pitcher
- Bats: Left Throws: Left

Teams
- Nebraska (2026–present)

Career highlights and awards
- Big Ten Freshman of the Year (2026); Second team All-Big Ten (2026); Big Ten All-Freshman team (2026)

Alexis Jensen is an American college softball pitcher for Nebraska.

== High school career ==
Jensen attended Gretna High School in Gretna, Nebraska. During her junior year she posted a 32–4 record with a 1.31 ERA, surrendering 78 hits in 134 innings pitched, while striking out 264 batters. She also batted .494 with seven home runs, 34 RBI and a 1.452 OPS. Following an outstanding season, she was named the Nebraska Gatorade Softball Player of the Year.

During her senior year she posted a 20–0 record with a 0.29 ERA, while striking out 234 batters. She hit .549 with 10 home runs and 44 RBI. She led the Dragons to an undefeated season and the Class A state championship for the first time in school history. During the championship game against Millard North she struck out 15 and hit the game-ending three-run home run. Following an outstanding season she was named Nebraska Gatorade Softball Player of the Year for the second consecutive year.

She finished her career at Gretna as the program leader in batting average (.445), career wins (83), strikeouts (959) and ERA (1.30).

== College career ==
On November 13, 2024, Jensen committed to play college softball at Nebraska. During the 2026 season in her freshman year, she posted a 25–2 record, with a 2.39 ERA and 217 strikeouts. She led all NCAA Division I freshman in wins and strikeouts. Nationally, she ranks fourth in strikeout-to-walk ratio, sixth in strikeouts per seven innings and seventh in wins. Following the season she was named the Big Ten Freshman of the Year. She was also named a top-three finalist for the NFCA National Freshman of the Year. On May 17, 2026, during the 2026 NCAA Division I softball tournament regional finals against Grand Canyon she tied Lori Sippel's freshman program record with 210 strikeouts. The win marked her 24th of the season, and tied Jenny Voss for the single-season freshman program record.
