= Bob De Carolis =

American college administrator and coach

Biographical details
- Born: c. 1952 (age 73–74)

Coaching career (HC unless noted)

Softball
- 1981–1984: Michigan (softball)

Administrative career (AD unless noted)
- 1979–1980: Michigan (admin. asst.)
- 1980–1983: Michigan (asst. business mgr.)
- 1983–1987: Michigan (business mgr.)
- 1987–1990: Michigan (asst. AD)
- 1990–1994: Michigan (assoc. AD)
- 1994–1996: Michigan (dir. financial ops.)
- 1996–1998: Michigan (senior assoc. AD)
- 1998–2002: Oregon State (asst. AD)
- 2002–2015: Oregon State
- 2015: Michigan (advisor to AD)

Head coaching record
- Overall: 144–81

Robert James De Carolis (born c. 1952) is an American former athletics administrator and softball coach. He served as the athletic director at Oregon State University from 2002 to 2015. He previously worked for the University of Michigan athletic department from 1979 to 1998 and as Oregon State's assistant athletic director from 1998 to 2002. He was also the head coach of the Michigan Wolverines softball team from 1981 to 1984, compiling a four-year record of 144–81 (.640).

== Early years ==
De Carolis received his undergraduate degree from Bloomsburg State in 1978. He began his career as a volunteer assistant football and softball coach at the University of Massachusetts Amherst (1978–1979) while completing a master's degree in sport management.

== University of Michigan ==
From 1979 to 1998, De Carolis spent 19 years working on the athletic department staff at the University of Michigan.

In October 1980, De Carolis was appointed as the second head coach of the Michigan Wolverines softball team, replacing Gloria Soluk. He had previously served as an assistant softball coach at both UMass and Michigan. De Carolis served four years as Michigan's head softball coach from 1981 to 1984, compiling a 144–81 record (.640). After the 1984 season, he was replaced as head softball coach by Carol Hutchins, who had been an assistant to De Carolis during the 1983 and 1984 seasons.

== Oregon State ==
In 1998, De Carolis left Michigan to accept a position as the assistant athletic director at Oregon State University. He remained in that post for four years. In August 2002, he was appointed as Oregon State's athletic director by then OSU President Dr. Paul Risser. He was credited with leading the largest fundraising campaign in the history of the Oregon State athletic department, raising funds for a project to expand Reser Stadium. In May 2006, De Carolis was given a five-year contract extension through 2011 as Oregon State's athletic director. In May 2011, he was given a further five-year extension through 2016. However, in June 2011, he was diagnosed with Parkinson's disease. He decided to resign as athletic director in 2015.

In 2009, De Carolis received the Harold J. VanderZwaag Distinguished Alumnus Award from Boston College.
