= Nikki Nemitz =

American softball player

Personal information
- Born: May 15, 1988 (age 38) St. Clair Shores, Michigan, U.S.

Sport
- Sport: Softball
- Position: Pitcher
- Team: Michigan Wolverines (2007–10); Chicago Bandits (2010–13)

Nicole Ashley Nemitz (born May 15, 1988) is an American former volunteer assistant coach for the Michigan Wolverines softball team. She was an All-American pitcher for the team, winning first-team NFCA/Louisville Slugger All-American honors in 2009.

== Early life ==
Nemitz's left arm made her a star athlete from an early age. Her mother noted that even family walks turned into races between Nemitz and her brother. Her mother recalled, "They used to race from tree to tree. Everything was a competition."

== Regina High School ==
Nemitz attended Regina High School, a Catholic high school in Harper Woods, Michigan. Nemitz helped lead the Regina Saddlelites to three consecutive Class A Michigan state championships in 2004, 2005 and 2006. Her high school pitching record was 71-2, with an ERA of 0.25. She was the 2006 Michigan Gatorade Softball Player of the Year and a 2006 Louisville Slugger/NFCA High School All-American.

In May 2006, Detroit Free Press writer Chris Silva wrote a column about Nemitz and about his attempt to hit her pitches. Of the 20 or so pitches Nemitz threw to Silva, he wrote, "I made contact on only two - one a soft dribbler, the other a dinky foul ball that really stung my hands." Silva wrote that Nemitz's fastball slipped past him so fast that, "It made me flinch. I actually felt a breeze, and my knees buckled. Sometimes I was too shocked at how fast it was to even swing."

== University of Michigan ==
Nemitz was highly recruited out of high school, but chose to remain close to home, enrolling at the University of Michigan. It didn't hurt that the Michigan women's softball team coached by Hall of Famer Carol Hutchins had won the 2005 Women's College World Series shortly before Nemitz signed her letter of intent in November 2005.

Nemitz earned a bachelor's in physical education from the University of Michigan.

=== 2007 season ===
As a freshman in 2007, Nemitz started 25 games and had a 22-4 pitching record with a 1.88 ERA and 152 strikeouts. In February 2007, Nemitz was the winning pitcher in the 1,000th career coaching victory for Michigan coach Carol Hutchins. She was selected as an All-Big Ten Conference first team pitcher as a freshman and threw a complete-game two-hitter in the NCAA Super Regional against Baylor. After completing her freshman season, Nemitz told her hometown newspaper, "It's better than even I could have imagined. I just love Michigan. School is tough, softball is great."

=== 2008 season ===
In her sophomore season, Nemitz improved to 21-4 with a 1.04 ERA and 211 strikeouts. In February 2009, she threw a perfect game as the Wolverines beat Birmingham–Southern College 8-0 in a five-inning, mercy-shortened game, striking out seven of the 15 batters she faced. She struck out a career best 15 in a game against Wisconsin in April 2008. Later that month, Nemitz won her 20th game of the season, a 10-0 mercy-shortened three-hitter over Michigan State in which Nemitz also hit a grand slam high over the foul pole in right field. After the game, Nemitz told a reporter, "I couldn't really tell (if it was a fair ball), but once they pointed fair, I just sprinted around the bases. This is the first day my hitting actually outshined my pitching, which is a little weird for me." She attracted further attention in May 2008 when she pitched three strong innings against the U.S. Olympic team. One newspaper account described her achievement as follows:

For three innings, Nikki Nemitz almost matched who might be the best softball pitcher in the world out for out. Nemitz, a sophomore. Not just a sophomore, but a kid who came to the University of Michigan a year ago an unknown, without any other big-time softball offers. Yet, there she was - shutout inning in the third, one run allowed in the fourth, shutout in the fifth, one run in the sixth, against the U.S. Olympic softball team. ... If you don't follow college softball, the best analogy to understand what Michigan pitchers Nemitz and Jordan Taylor were up against at Alumni Field would be to imagine college kids - a sophomore and a true freshman - being asked to pitch to a major league baseball team. No, not just a major league team, but an All-Star team, the best nine hitters in the country."

Nemitz was honored as an NFCA All-America third team pitcher and was named the All-Great Lakes Region first team pitcher for the second straight year.

Nemitz also proved to be a good hitter as a sophomore, starting 54 games as Michigan’s designated player.

=== 2009 season ===
As a junior in 2009, Nemitz had a record of 28-5 with a 0.89 ERA and 295 strikeouts. She opened the season with an 18-strikeout three-hitter against Pittsburgh. In February, she was named MVP at the FAU Classic in Boca Raton, Florida. In the tournament, Nemitz was 2-0 with a 0.42 ERA, striking out 29 batters and hitting .500 with two RBIs. In March 2009, Nemitz pitched a complete game 4-0 shutout against one of the country's top teams, the University of Arizona. After the game, the Tucson Citizen wrote:

Nikki Nemitz still has University of Arizona's number. The Michigan pitcher shut down UA softball team for the second straight year, tossing a two-hitter in the Wolverines' 4-0 win over No. 12 UA at the Judi Garman Classic in Fullerton, Calif., on Sunday. ... Nemitz (12-3) struck out 11 and walked two. Last year, she also tossed a two-hit shutout in Michigan's 2-0 win over the Wildcats.

In April 2009, Nemitz hit a three-run home run, struck out 14 batters and won her 17th game, a 4-1 win over Minnesota. Michigan Coach Carol Hutchins noted Nemitz's focus and determination in 2009: "She's been Zen-like this year. Quiet, masterful, just stays in her moment. She's done an outstanding job."

At the end of the regular season, Nemitz was honored as a Louisville Slugger/NFCA All-America first-team selection. She became the first pitcher in Michigan Wolverines softball history to start her career with three consecutive 20-win seasons.

=== 2009 post-season ===
On May 23, 2009, Nemitz helped lead the Wolverines to the Women's College World Series with a complete game win over Baylor, 8-1, in the NCAA Super Regional at Ann Arbor.

On May 29, 2009, Nemitz threw a three-hitter in the Women's College World Series as Michigan beat No. 4 ranked Alabama, 6-1. Nemitz was pitching a shutout until Whitney Larsen hit an RBI double with Alabama down to its last out.

On May 30, 2009, Nemitz was the losing pitcher in Michigan's 1-0 loss to the University of Florida as Florida shortstop Megan Bush hit a solo home run to break a scoreless tie in the top of the sixth inning. After the loss, Nemitz gave credit to Florida senior Stacey Nelson who threw a one-hitter against the Wolverines: "She throws hard. She can go to either side of the plate. You just have to be ready for it. She can pinpoint her position, perfectly. She can bring the ball up a little bit, put it down. And she can keep you off speed with that change-up, as well."

=== 2010 season ===
As a senior in 2010, Nemitz compiled a record of 21-3 with an ERA 1.70 and 173 strikeouts in 144 innings pitched.

== Chicago Bandits ==
Nemitz was drafted fourth overall by the Chicago Bandits in the 2010 NPF senior draft, where she played until 2013.

== Coaching ==
As of 2015, Nemitz is serving as volunteer assistant softball coach at the University of Michigan, as she has since 2012.
