= Wendy Allen (softball) =

American softball player (born 1982)

Biographical details
- Born: April 5, 1982 (age 44); Moreno Valley, California, U.S.

Playing career
- 2001–2002: Ohio State
- 2003–2004: U of Arizona
- 2004: Arizona Heat
- 2006: Caronno Rheavendors
- Positions: Pitcher, infielder

Coaching career (HC unless noted)
- 2006–2008: Redlands (asst.)

Accomplishments and honors

Awards
- Big Ten Freshman of the Year (2001); Big Ten Player of the Year (2002)

Wendy Jo Allen Hauser (born April 5, 1982) is an American, former collegiate All-American, left-handed hitting professional All-Star softball pitcher and former coach. She played for two NCAA Division I teams: Ohio State Buckeyes 2001-02 and the Arizona Wildcats from 2003-04. She was named the Big Ten Conference Player of the Year in 2002 and a NFCA First-Team All-American at Arizona in 2004. She was later selected 21st in the National Pro Fastpitch draft and played in 2004, being named an All-Star. She is a softball record holder for Ohio State.

== Career ==
Allen attended Valley View High School from 1996 to 1997, and Moreno Valley High School from 1997 to 2000. She then attended Ohio State University, and played varsity softball for the Buckeyes from fall 2000 to 2002. She was named a Second Team All-American as a sophomore, and set a then school career record in batting average (.375) for her two years of play. In the fall of 2002 she transferred to the University of Arizona where she competed for the varsity softball team from 2002 to 2004. Allen would leave ranking 10th in the NCAA all-time for career doubles.

In the summer of 2004 she was drafted to play on the now defunct Arizona Heat.

After graduating with a Bachelor of Science in Business from the Eller College of Management, she played the 2006 season in Caronno Pertusella, Italy for the A.B. Caronno Rheavendors.

In 2006, Allen joined the University of Redlands coaching staff, first as a volunteer coach and then later as a graduate assistant. In 2008 she graduated with a Master of Arts in Education: Higher Education.

== Career stats ==
=== Ohio State Buckeyes & Arizona Wildcats ===
YEAR	G	AB	R	H	BA	RBI	HR	3B	2B	TB	SLG	BB	SO	SB	SBA	OBP
2001	57	166	26	59	.355	17	1	2	12	78	.470%	7	7	7	8	.377%
2002	68	196	34	77	.393	51	9	2	19	127	.648%	16	15	3	4	.429%
2003	61	179	31	58	.324	28	3	0	14	81	.453%	22	22	1	1	.396%
2004	60	159	35	63	.396	73	8	1	16	105	.660%	33	17	4	6	.490%
Totals	246	700	126	257	.367	169	21	5	61	391	.558%	78	61	15	19	

YEAR	W	L	GP	GS	CG	SHO	SV	IP	H	R	ER	BB	SO	ERA	WHIP
2001	6	4	25	9	4	2	4	75.2	38	9	7	7	83	0.65	0.60
2002	18	6	30	21	13	5	3	140.2	95	33	20	44	143	1.00	0.99
2003	12	2	17	3	1	0	0	77.2	69	32	28	24	64	2.54	1.20
2004	9	0	12	8	6	3	0	62.1	45	14	11	8	76	1.24	0.85
Totals	45	12	84	41	24	10	7	356.1	247	88	66	83	366	1.29	0.92

=== NPF Arizona Heat ===
Arizona Heat hitting
Year	G	AB	R	H	BA	RBI	HR	3B	2B	TB	SLG	BB	SO	SB	SBA	OBP
2004		114	11	30	.263	20	2	1	12		.439	15	14			.349

=== Italian League ===
A.B. Caronno hitting
Year	G	AB	R	H	BA	RBI	HR	3B	2B	TB	SLG	BB	SO	SB	SBA	OBP
2006	36	106	18	32	.302	9	1	4	2	46	.434	16	10	6		.384

A.B. Caronno pitching
Year	W	L	GP	GS	CG	SHO	SV	IP	H	R	ER	BB	SO	ERA	WHIP
2006	5	13	18		12	0	0	119	102	57	34	41	111	2.0	1.20
