= Vicki Morrow =

American softball player

Vicki Morrow is an American former collegiate All-American right-handed batting softball pitcher and outfielder, originally from Pontiac, Michigan. She played for the Michigan Wolverines softball team from 1984 to 1987. She was named Big Ten Player of the Year in 1987, selected to the Big Ten All-Decade Team, and inducted into the University of Michigan Athletic Hall of Honor in 2004. She has also been a softball coach at Rutgers University, St. Peter's College and Kean University.

== Softball player ==
A native of Waterford, Michigan, Morrow attended Pontiac Catholic High School. She attended the University of Michigan where she played for Hall of Fame coach Carol Hutchins and became one of the best pitchers in school history. As a senior in 1987, Morrow won 26 games, including 18 shutouts, struck out 446 batters, and was named the Big Ten Player of the Year. In her career at Michigan, Morrow had 65 wins and 446 strikeouts in 700-2/3 innings. She also set a school record with four no-hitters. Morrow also played for the United States team at the Pan American Games as an outfielder, and won a gold medal. In 1992 she was named to the Big Ten All-Decade Team (1982–1992), and in 2004 she was inducted into the University of Michigan Athletic Hall of Honor.

== Softball coach ==
In 2000, Morrow was named assistant coach of the Rutgers University softball team. Rutgers coach Pat Willis announced the hiring, saying she intended to utilize Morrow as a pitching coach. Prior to accepting the position at Rutgers, Morrow served as the head coach of St. Peter's College in Jersey City, New Jersey, and as an assistant coach at Kean University, totaling five years of previous coaching experience. Morrow had also worked as a private pitching instructor for several years. Off the field, Morrow also played a role in establishing local youth softball programs, including founding the ASA's Morris County Belles, and has organized and directed pitching camps in New Jersey.

== Statistics ==
=== Michigan Wolverines ===
YEAR	W	L	GP	GS	CG	SHO	SV	IP	H	R	ER	BB	SO	ERA	WHIP
1984	9	11	26	20	14	2	1	145.2	128	59	32	17	84	1.54	1.00
1985	15	5	22	17	16	5	0	154.2	126	36	24	29	75	1.09	1.00
1986	15	7	24	22	20	10	0	154.0	76	17	10	27	144	0.45	0.67
1987	26	9	38	32	31	18	0	246.1	157	45	28	41	143	0.79	0.80
TOTALS	65	32	110	91	81	35	1	700.2	487	157	94	114	446	0.94	0.86

YEAR	G	AB	R	H	BA	RBI	HR	3B	2B	TB	SLG	BB	SO	SB	SBA
1985	42	112	26	35	.312	10	0	2	1	40	.357%	10	14	14	15
1986	47	146	24	50	.342	22	2	5	5	71	.486%	6	12	10	14
1987	56	166	30	48	.289	19	2	3	5	71	.427%	8	7	12	13
TOTALS	145	424	80	133	.313	51	4	10	11	182	.429%	24	33	36	42

== See also ==
- University of Michigan Athletic Hall of Honor
