= Jessica Bashor =

Greek softball player (born 1981)

Personal information
- Nationality: Greek
- Born: 8 April 1981 (age 43); Riverside, California, United States

Sport
- Sport: Softball

Jessica Bashor (born 8 April 1981) is a Greek softball player. She competed in the women's tournament at the 2004 Summer Olympics.
