= Alicia Seegert =

American softball player

Alicia Anne Seegert (born August 24, 1965) is a former All-American softball player. Considered one of the best softball players ever to play for the University of Michigan Wolverines softball team, she set Big Ten Conference records for batting average (.418 in 1984), hits, total bases and RBIs. In 2006, Seegert was inducted into the University of Michigan Athletic Hall of Honor.

== Student athlete ==
A native of Manchester, Michigan, Seegert graduated from Father Gabriel Richard High School in Ann Arbor, Michigan, in 1983. She played catcher for the Michigan Wolverines from 1984 to 1987. Seegert was known as an excellent defensive catcher and batter. She was the first Michigan Wolverine to receive first-team All-American honors in softball. She had a career batting average of .360 and 240 career hits. Her .418 batting average in 1984 set a Big Ten Conference record that stood until 1992 (Lezlie Weiss of Minnesota hit .468 in 1992). She also set Big Ten records for hits, total bases and RBIs. She was named a first-team NFCA All-American in 1986 and a second team All-American in 1987. She was also selected to the All-Big Ten Conference team all four years at Michigan. In 1987, she was named Michigan's Female Athlete of the Year. Seegert graduated from Michigan in 1988 and was named to the Big Ten Conference All-Decade team in 1992.

== University of Michigan Athletic Hall of Honor ==
In 2006, Seegert was inducted into the University of Michigan Athletic Hall of Honor, joining the ranks of Fielding H. Yost, Tom Harmon, Cazzie Russell, George Sisler and Gerald R. Ford. After learning of the honor, Seegert told a reporter, "I was really shocked. I really enjoyed my time at U-M. It gave me so many opportunities. To be honored as one of the top athletes there, it's just mind-boggling."

== Teacher and softball coach ==
Seegert later became a teacher, in Saline, Michigan, where she later retired in 2019. She also coached softball in Saline and Clinton, Michigan. She is currently teaching fitness and physical education at Saline High School in Saline, Michigan.

== See also ==
- University of Michigan Athletic Hall of Honor
