= Michigan Wolverines softball =

University of Michigan softball team

- 2027 Michigan Wolverines softball team
- Founded: 1978 (48 years ago)
- University: University of Michigan
- All-time Record: 1,873–671–5 (.736)
- Head coach: Bonnie Tholl (4th season)
- Conference: Big Ten
- Location: Ann Arbor, Michigan, US
- Home stadium: Carol Hutchins Stadium (capacity: 2,800)
- Nickname: Wolverines
- Colors: Maize and blue

NCAA Tournament champions
- 2005

NCAA WCWS runner-up
- 2015

NCAA WCWS appearances
- 1995, 1996, 1997, 1998, 2001, 2002, 2004, 2005, 2009, 2013, 2015, 2016

AIAW WCWS appearances
- 1982

NCAA super regional appearances
- 2005, 2006, 2007, 2008, 2009, 2010, 2012, 2013, 2014, 2015, 2016

NCAA Tournament appearances
- 1992, 1993, 1995, 1996, 1997, 1998, 1999, 2000, 2001, 2002, 2003, 2004, 2005, 2006, 2007, 2008, 2009, 2010, 2011, 2012, 2013, 2014, 2015, 2016, 2017, 2018, 2019, 2021, 2022, 2024, 2025, 2026

Conference tournament championships
- 1995, 1996, 1997, 1998, 2000, 2002, 2005, 2006, 2015, 2019, 2024, 2025

Regular-season conference championships
- 1992, 1993, 1995, 1996, 1998, 1999, 2001, 2002, 2004, 2005, 2008, 2009, 2010, 2011, 2012, 2013, 2014, 2015, 2016, 2018, 2019, 2021

The Michigan Wolverines softball team represents the University of Michigan in National Collegiate Athletic Association (NCAA) Division I competition. College softball became a varsity sport at the University of Michigan in 1978. Bonnie Tholl has been the head coach since 2023, following the retirement of longtime head coach Carol Hutchins. In 2005, Hutchins' team became the first Division I softball team since 1976 from east of the Mississippi River to win the Women's College World Series.

== History ==
=== Soluk years ===
Gloria Soluk was the first head coach of the Michigan Wolverines softball team. When she was hired by Michigan in 1977, it was as Michigan's women's basketball coach, and there was no softball team. She later recalled, "I was asked to serve as the head coach for the first few seasons in order to get things off the ground." In her three seasons as head coach from 1978 to 1980, the Wolverines compiled a record of 50 wins and 25 losses for a .667 winning percentage.

=== De Carolis years ===
Bob De Carolis was the Wolverines second head coach, holding that position from 1980 to 1984. In his four seasons as head coach, the Wolverines compiled a record of 114 wins and 81 losses for a .585 winning percentage. In 1982, De Carolis led Michigan to a first-place finish in the AIAW Regional Championships and a third-place finish in the AIAW Women's College World Series. De Carolis remained on Michigan's athletic department staff until 1998 when he accepted a post with Oregon State University. He has been Oregon State's athletic director since 2002.

=== Hutchins era ===
Carol Hutchins became the head coach of the Michigan Wolverines softball team in 1985. When she took over as head coach, Hutchins reportedly "had a tiny salary, an only slightly larger budget, and had to take care of her own field, throwing down lime and riding the lawn tractor." Since Hutchins became Michigan's coach, the team has never had a losing season. Hutchins' teams have also won 19 Big Ten Conference regular-season titles and 18 NCAA regional championships. She has been named Big Ten Coach of the Year on eighteen occasions and National Fastpitch Coaches Association (NFCA) National Coach of the Year twice.

She led the Michigan softball team to its first NCAA Women's College World Series championship in 2005. The decisive game was won in dramatic fashion, with a Samantha Findlay home run in the top of the 10th inning, producing a 4–1 final. The 2005 Michigan Wolverines softball team was the first team from East of the Mississippi River to win the NCAA Women's College World Series. (Hutchins played shortstop for Michigan State when they won the AIAW WCWS national championship in 1976.) The Ann Arbor News described the team's accomplishment this way:

"What happened during the past five months might be the most unlikely accomplishment in the history of a storied athletics program, analogous to setting out to win an NCAA hockey title at the University of New Mexico. Then doing it. Now, before you dismiss that as hyperbole, consider a few factors. Like the fact that, because of cold weather, the Wolverines played their first 33 games on the road, roughly half the season. Try doing that in football or basketball. Then there's recruiting. Softball is still a sport dominated by West Coast talent. ... There's a reason no team East of the Mississippi had won an NCAA softball title until now."

After Michigan defeated No. 1 ranked Arizona in March 2005, Hutchins told a reporter, "Yes, there is softball east of the Rockies." The performance of the 2005 team also set Michigan records in several categories:

- The team's 65 victories was the most in school history;
- The team recorded 32 consecutive victories between February 13, 2005, and March 30, 2005;
- The team's 103 home runs tied for the second most in NCAA history.

After winning the World Series, Hutchins and her team visited the White House in July 2005, where they met with President George W. Bush, something Hutchins called "a once-in-a-lifetime experience."

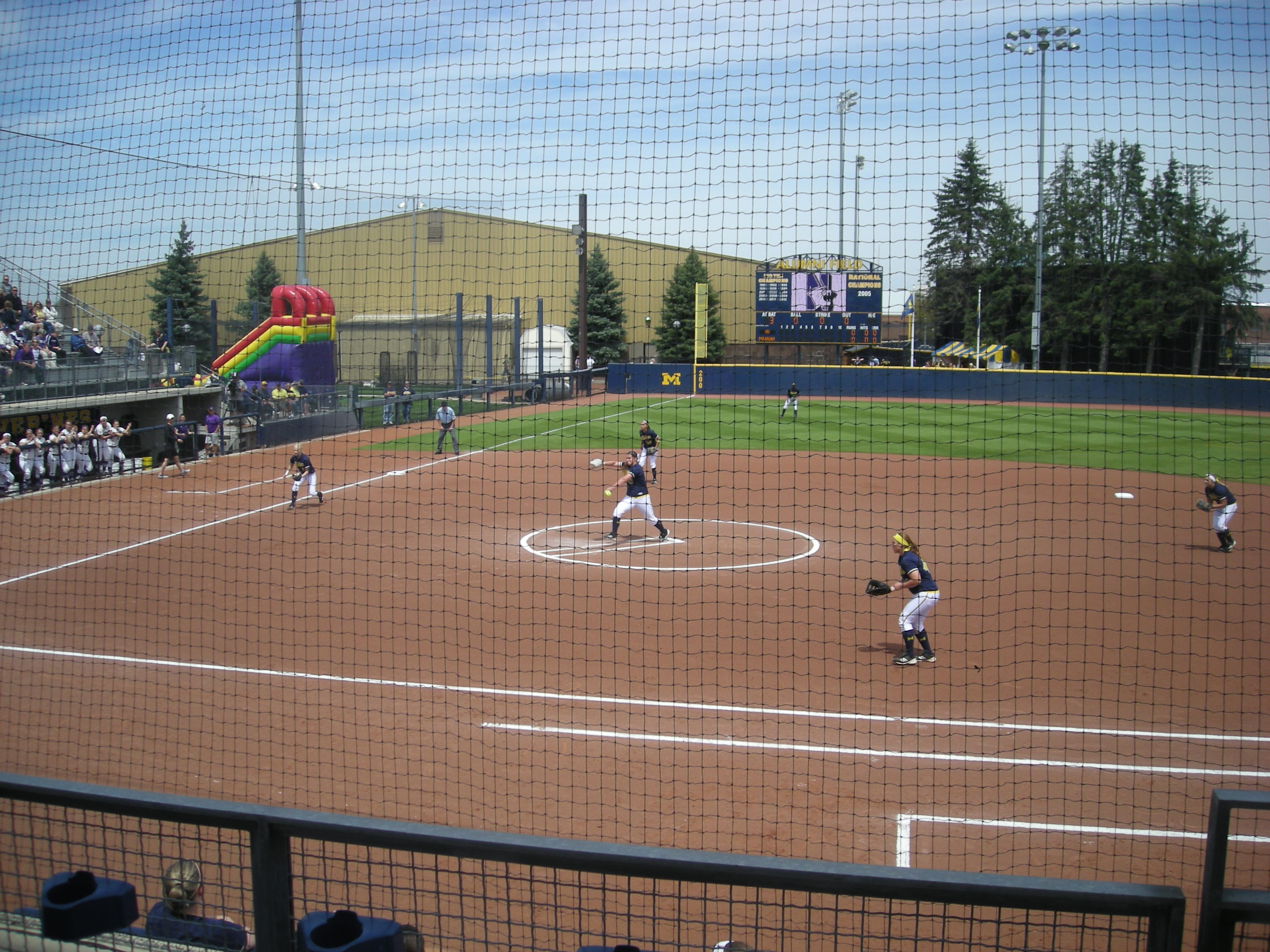
The 2013 team (in blue) in action against Northwestern

In 2006, Hutchins was inducted into the NFCA Hall of Fame.

In March 2000, Hutchins recorded her 638th win, giving her more career wins than any other coach in University of Michigan history in any sport, male or female. In 2007, she became the seventh coach in NCAA softball history, and the first in any sport at the University of Michigan, to reach 1,000 career wins. After winning her 1,000th game, Hutchins told a reporter that her greatest pride did not come from the 1,000 wins, but from her ability to influence how her players look at life, "to get them to work together and to meet standards, to show them they can lead as women." When she was inducted into the NFCA Hall of Fame, her players presented her with a scrapbook with a note from one saying, "I came here a girl with potential and left here a woman with no limits." Hutchins noted that those 15 words matter more than the 1,000 wins.

In 2009, the Wolverines advanced to the Women's College World Series in Oklahoma City. They won the first game against Alabama by a score of 6–1. In their second game, they lost a close game to Florida by a score of 1–0. They were eliminated in a 7–5 loss to Georgia on May 30, 2009.

In 2015, behind the hitting of Sierra Romero and the pitching of Megan Betsa and Haylie Wagner, Michigan won its ninth Big Ten tournament and its eighth consecutive Big Ten regular season championship, and were the 2015 Women's College World Series runner-up.

On October 4, 2017, Hutchins signed a five-year contract extension with the Wolverines.

On August 24, 2022, Hutchins announced her retirement after 38 years as head coach at Michigan. At the time of her retirement, she was the winningest coach in NCAA Division I history, compiling a record of 1,684–540–5 at Michigan.

=== Tholl era ===
Following the retirement of long-time head coach Hutchins, Bonnie Tholl was named the head coach on August 24, 2022.

=== Coaching history ===
Years	Coach	Record	%
1975–1976	Gloria Soluk	49–25	.662
1977	Bob De Carolis	114–81	.585
1985–2022	Carol Hutchins	1,684–540–5	.757
2023–present	Bonnie Tholl	144–86	.626

== Championships ==
=== NCAA Women's College World Series National Championships ===
Season	Record	Head Coach
2005	65–7	Carol Hutchins

=== Conference Championships ===
Season	Conference	Record	Head Coach
1992	Big Ten Conference	22–6	Carol Hutchins
1993	Big Ten Conference	21–5	Carol Hutchins
1995	Big Ten Conference	22–6	Carol Hutchins
1996	Big Ten Conference	20–4	Carol Hutchins
1998	Big Ten Conference	22–1	Carol Hutchins
1999	Big Ten Conference	21–3	Carol Hutchins
2001	Big Ten Conference	17–3	Carol Hutchins
2002	Big Ten Conference	15–3	Carol Hutchins
2004	Big Ten Conference	17–3	Carol Hutchins
2005	Big Ten Conference	15–2	Carol Hutchins
2008	Big Ten Conference	18–2	Carol Hutchins
2009	Big Ten Conference	17–3	Carol Hutchins
2010	Big Ten Conference	18–1	Carol Hutchins
2011	Big Ten Conference	18–2	Carol Hutchins
2012	Big Ten Conference	18–5	Carol Hutchins
2013	Big Ten Conference	20–2	Carol Hutchins
2014	Big Ten Conference	18–5	Carol Hutchins
2015	Big Ten Conference	21–2	Carol Hutchins
2016	Big Ten Conference	21–2	Carol Hutchins
2018	Big Ten Conference	18–3	Carol Hutchins
2019	Big Ten Conference	22–1	Carol Hutchins
2021	Big Ten Conference	36–6	Carol Hutchins

=== Conference Tournament Championships ===
Season	Conference	Tournament Location	Head Coach
1995	Big Ten Conference	Ann Arbor, MI	Carol Hutchins
1996	Big Ten Conference	Ann Arbor, MI	Carol Hutchins
1997	Big Ten Conference	Iowa City, IA	Carol Hutchins
1998	Big Ten Conference	Ann Arbor, MI	Carol Hutchins
2000	Big Ten Conference	Iowa City, IA	Carol Hutchins
2002	Big Ten Conference	Ann Arbor, MI	Carol Hutchins
2005	Big Ten Conference	Ann Arbor, MI	Carol Hutchins
2006	Big Ten Conference	Evanston, IL	Carol Hutchins
2015	Big Ten Conference	Columbus, OH	Carol Hutchins
2019	Big Ten Conference	Bloomington, IN	Carol Hutchins
2024	Big Ten Conference	Iowa City, IA	Bonnie Tholl
2025	Big Ten Conference	West Lafayette, IN	Bonnie Tholl

== Coaching staff ==
Name	Position coached	Consecutive season at Michigan in current position
Bonnie Tholl	Head coach	4th
Jennifer Brundage	Assistant Coach and Pitching Coach	28th
Amanda Chidester	Assistant Coach	4th
Carmyn Greenwood	Volunteer Coach	1st
Amber Garrett	Director of Operations	4th
Jeremy Kelch	Player Development	3rd

== Year-by-year results ==
This is a partial list of the last five seasons completed by the Wolverines.

Year	Coach	Record	Notes
2022	Carol Hutchins	38–18	NCAA Regional
2023	Bonnie Tholl	26–25	
2024	Bonnie Tholl	43–18	Big Ten Tournament Champions; NCAA Regional
2025	Bonnie Tholl	39–21	Big Ten Tournament Champions; NCAA Regional
2026	Bonnie Tholl	36–22	NCAA Regional

== Notable players ==
=== National Awards ===
NFCA National Player of the Year

- Sierra Romero (2016)

USA Softball Collegiate Player of the Year

- Sierra Romero (2016)

espnW National Player of the Year

- Sierra Romero (2016)

Honda Sports Award

- Sierra Romero (2016)

=== Conference Awards ===
Big Ten Player of the Year

- Vicki Morrow, 1987
- Michelle Bolster, 1988
- Jenny Allard, 1989
- Patti Benedict, 1992, 1993
- Sara Griffin, 1995, 1996
- Traci Conrad, 1998, 1999
- Melissa Taylor, 2001
- Marissa Young, 2003
- Jessica Merchant, 2004
- Nikki Nemitz, 2010
- Maggie Viefhaus, 2010
- Amanda Chidester, 2011, 2012
- Sierra Romero, 2013, 2014, 2016
- Lexie Blair, 2021

Big Ten Pitcher of the Year

- Kelly Kovach, 1992, 1995
- Kelly Forbis, 1993
- Kelly Holmes, 1997
- Sara Griffin, 1998
- Marie Barda, 1999
- Marissa Young, 2002
- Nicole Motycka, 2004
- Jennie Ritter, 2005
- Nikki Nemitz, 2009
- Jordan Taylor, 2010
- Haylie Wagner, 2012
- Megan Betsa, 2015, 2016
- Meghan Beaubien, 2018
- Alex Storako, 2021

Big Ten Freshman of the Year

- Patti Benedict, 1990
- Kelly Kovach, 1992
- Tracy Carr, 1993
- Sara Griffin, 1995
- Traci Conrad, 1996
- Melissa Gentile, 1997
- Kelsey Kollen, 1999
- Nicole Motycka, 2002
- Samantha Findlay, 2005
- Jordan Taylor, 2008
- Haylie Wagner, 2012
- Sierra Romero, 2013
- Meghan Beaubien, 2018

Big Ten Coach of the Year

- Carol Hutchins, 1985
- Carol Hutchins, 1992
- Carol Hutchins, 1993
- Carol Hutchins, 1996
- Carol Hutchins, 1998
- Carol Hutchins, 1999
- Carol Hutchins, 2001
- Carol Hutchins, 2004
- Carol Hutchins, 2005
- Carol Hutchins, 2008
- Carol Hutchins, 2009
- Carol Hutchins, 2011
- Carol Hutchins, 2012
- Carol Hutchins, 2013
- Carol Hutchins, 2015
- Carol Hutchins, 2016
- Carol Hutchins, 2018
- Carol Hutchins, 2021

=== All-Americans ===
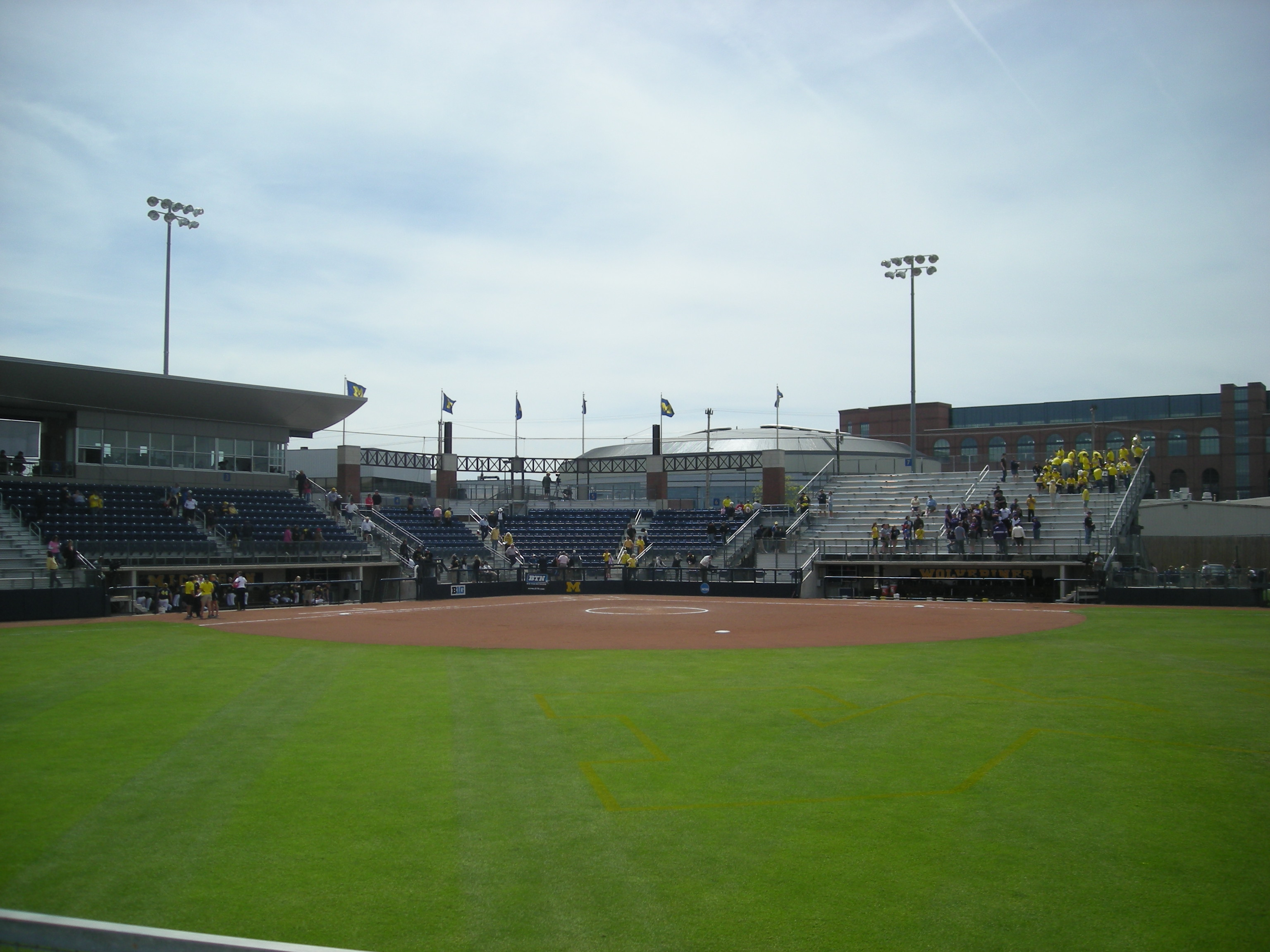
Alumni Field, the home of the Michigan Wolverines softball team

Michigan has had 41 players selected as NFCA All-Americans, combining for 69 total honors.

- 2021: Alex Storako, at-large pitcher (2nd team)
- 2018: Meghan Beaubien, at-large pitcher (1st team)
- 2018: Faith Canfield, at-large 2nd base (3rd team)
- 2017: Megan Betsa, pitcher (2nd team)
- 2017: Kelly Christner, outfielder (2nd team)
- 2017: Faith Canfield, 2nd base (3rd team)
- 2016: Sierra Lawrence, outfielder (1st team)
- 2016: Tera Blanco, 1st base (1st team)
- 2016: Sierra Romero, 2nd base (1st team)
- 2016: Megan Betsa, pitcher (2nd team)
- 2015: Kelly Christner, outfielder (1st team)
- 2015: Sierra Romero, at-large 2nd base (1st team)
- 2014: Sierra Romero, shortstop (1st team)
- 2014: Haylie Wagner, at-large pitcher (2nd team)
- 2013: Sierra Romero, shortstop (2nd team)
- 2013: Ashley Lane, 2nd base (3rd team)
- 2011: Amanda Chidester, 3rd base (1st team)
- 2011: Jordan Taylor, at-large pitcher (2nd team)
- 2011: Ashley Lane, 2nd base (2nd team)
- 2011: Bree Evans, outfielder (3rd team)
- 2009: Nikki Nemitz, at-large pitcher (1st team)
- 2009: Amanda Chidester, utility non-pitcher (2nd team)
- 2008: Samantha Findlay, second base (1st team)
- 2008: Jordan Taylor, pitcher (2nd team)
- 2008: Alessandra Giampaolo, outfielder (2nd team)
- 2008: Nikki Nemitz, pitcher (3rd team)
- 2006: Jennie Ritter, pitcher (1st team)
- 2006: Becky Marx, catcher (3rd team)
- 2005: Jennie Ritter, pitcher (1st team)
- 2005: Jessica Merchant, shortstop (2nd team)
- 2005: Tiffany Haas, 2nd base (1st team)
- 2005: Nicole Motycka, designated player (3rd team)
- 2004: Jessica Merchant, shortstop (2nd team)
- 2004: Nicole Motycka, pitcher (2nd team)
- 2004: Tiffany Haas, 2nd base (3rd team)
- 2003: Marissa Young, utility (2nd team)
- 2002: Stephanie Volpe, 3rd base (1st team)
- 2002: Marissa Young, pitcher (3rd team)
- 2001: Kelsey Kollen, 2nd base (1st team)
- 2001: Melissa Taylor, outfield (2nd team)
- 2000: Marissa Young, utility (3rd team)
- 2000: Stephanie Volpe, designated player (3rd team)
- 1999: Catherine Davie, outfield (2nd team)
- 1999: Kelsey Kollen, 2nd base (2nd team)
- 1999: Traci Conrad, 1st base (3rd team)
- 1998: Traci Conrad, 1st base (1st team)
- 1998: Sara Griffin, utility (1st team)
- 1998: Melissa Gentile, catcher (2nd team)
- 1998: Kellyn Tate, outfield (2nd team)
- 1997: Traci Conrad, at-large (1st team)
- 1997: Kelly Holmes, at-large (2nd team)
- 1996: Sara Griffin, utility (1st team)
- 1996: Kellyn Tate, outfield (3rd team)
- 1995: Kelly Kovach, pitcher (1st team)
- 1995: Sara Griffin, utility (1st team)
- 1993: Patti Benedict, outfield (1st team)
- 1992: Patti Benedict, outfield (3rd team)
- 1989: Jenny Allard, utility (1st team)
- 1987: Alicia Seegert, catcher (2nd team)
- 1987: Vicki Morrow, designated player/utility (2nd team)
- 1986: Alicia Seegert, catcher (1st team)

=== Athletic Hall of Honor ===
- Penny Neer - (Class of 2002)
- Vicki Morrow - (Class of 2004)
- Alicia Seegert - (Class of 2005)
- Jenny Allard - (Class of 2008)
- Sara Griffin - (Class of 2011)
- Traci Conrad - (Class of 2015)
- Jennie Ritter - (Class of 2018)
- Samantha Findlay - (Class of 2022)

== See also ==
- 2005 Women's College World Series
- 1982 Women's College World Series
- List of NCAA Division I softball programs
