= Alumni Field at Carol Hutchins Stadium =

Home field for the Michigan Wolverines softball team

Alumni Field
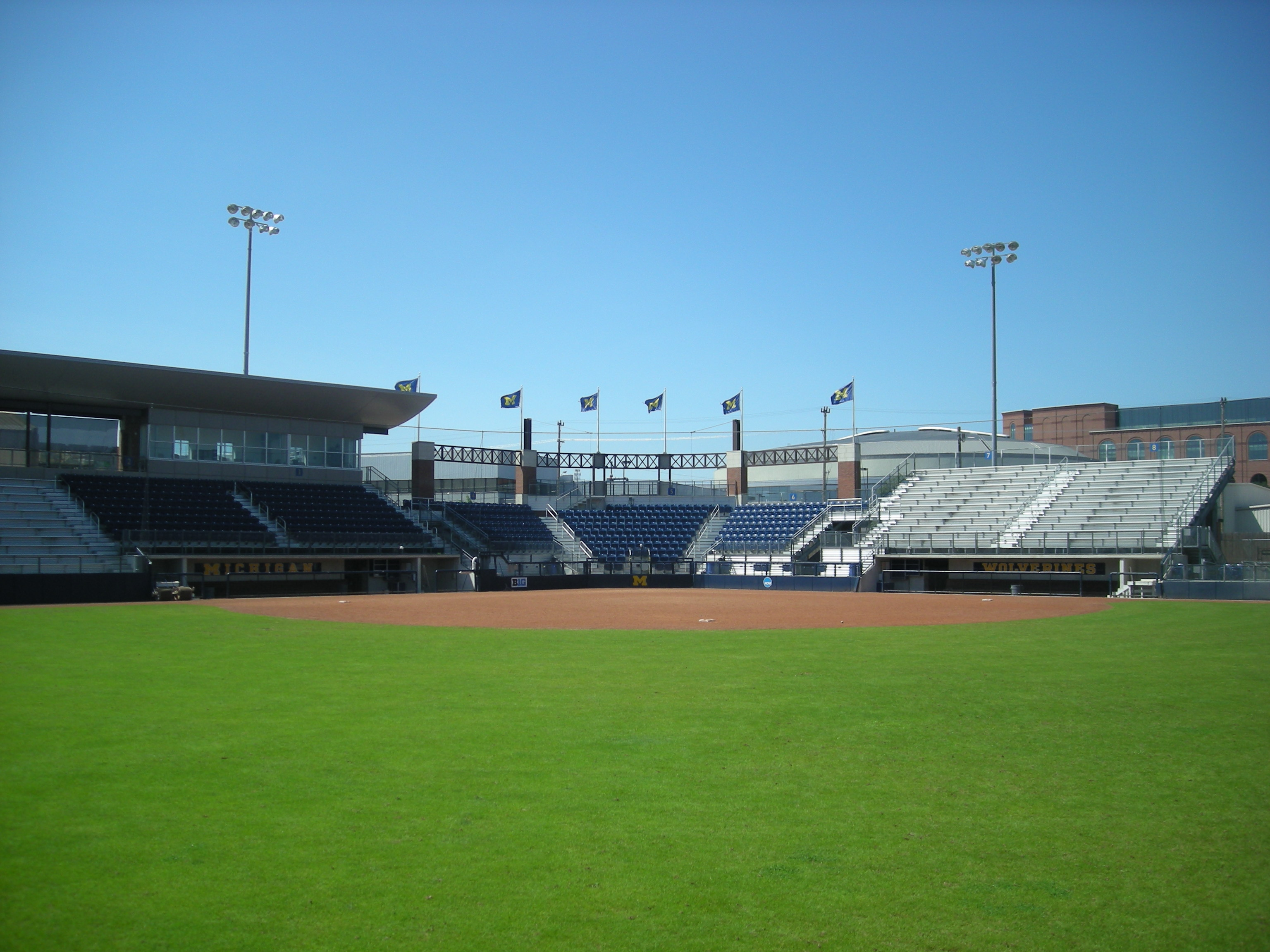

- Location within Michigan
- Full name: Alumni Field at Carol Hutchins Stadium
- Address: 1114 S. State St. Ann Arbor, MI 48104
- Location: Ann Arbor, Michigan, U.S.
- Coordinates: 42.2665922°N 83.7430223°W
- Operator: University of Michigan Athletics
- Capacity: 2,650
- Surface: AstroTurf

Construction
- Opened: May 3, 1982 (44 years ago)
- Renovated: 1992, 1998, 2008, 2014

Alumni Field at Carol Hutchins Stadium (formerly the Varsity Diamond) is the home field for the Michigan Wolverines softball team. It is on the campus of University of Michigan in Ann Arbor, Michigan.

== History ==
Varsity Diamond was constructed in 1982. It renamed to Alumni Field in 1992, and incorporated into the Wilpon Baseball and Softball Complex in 2007 through numerous upgrades. On March 23, 2023, it was announced that Alumni Field would be renamed in honor of former long-time head coach Carol Hutchins.
