= Ohio State Buckeyes softball =

- Founded: 1972
- University: Ohio State University
- Head coach: Kirin Kumar (1st season)
- Conference: Big Ten
- Location: Columbus, OH
- Home stadium: Buckeye Field (capacity: 1500)
- Nickname: Buckeyes
- Colors: Scarlet and gray

AIAW WCWS appearances
- 1982

NCAA super regional appearances
- 2009

NCAA Tournament appearances
- 1990, 2002, 2004, 2006, 2007, 2009, 2010, 2016, 2017, 2018, 2019, 2022, 2025

Conference tournament championships
- 2007

Regular-season conference championships
- 1990, 2007

The Ohio State Buckeyes softball team represents Ohio State University in NCAA Division I college softball. The team participates in the Big Ten Conference. The Buckeyes are led by head coach Kirin Kumar. The team plays its home games at Buckeye Field located on the university's campus.

== History ==
=== Coaching history ===
Years	Coach	Record	%
1972–1973	Catherine O’Brien	16–6	.727
1974–1977	Harriet Reynolds	27–28	.491
1978	Don Dungee	20–7	.741
1979–1985	Dianne Thompson	146–147–2	.498
1986–1988	Barb Dearing	56–89–2	.388
1989–1996	Gail Davenport	220–247	.471
1997–2012	Linda Kalafatis	538–358	.600
2013–2024	Kelly Kovach Schoenly	367–226–1	.619
2025–present	Kirin Kumar	45–14–1	.758

== Championships ==
=== Conference championships ===
Season	Conference	Record	Head coach
1990	Big Ten Conference	17–7	Gail Davenport
2007	Big Ten Conference	14–2	Linda Kalafatis

=== Conference tournament championships ===
Year	Conference	Tournament Location	Head coach
2007	Big Ten	Columbus, OH	Linda Kalafatis

== Coaching staff ==
Name	Position coached	Consecutive season at Ohio State in current position
Kirin Kumar	Head Coach	2nd
Courtney Vierstra	Assistant Coach	2nd
Matthew Guemmer	Assistant Coach	2nd
Karli Spaid	Assistant Coach	1st
Megan Smith	Director of Operations	10th

== Notable players ==
Big Ten Player of the Year

- Wendy Allen, 2002

Big Ten Freshman of the Year

- Wendy Allen, 2001
- Melanie Nichols, 2010

Big Ten Coach of the Year

- Gail Davenport, 1990
- Linda Kalafatis, 2002
- Linda Kalafatis, 2007
