= Penn State Nittany Lions softball =

- Founded: 1965
- University: Pennsylvania State University
- Head coach: Clarisa Crowell (6th season)
- Conference: Big Ten
- Location: University Park, Pennsylvania, US
- Home stadium: Beard Field at Nittany Lion Softball Park (capacity: 1,084)
- Nickname: Nittany Lions
- Colors: Blue and white

NCAA Tournament appearances
- 1983, 1985, 2000, 2001, 2002, 2003, 2005, 2006, 2007, 2011, 2024

Conference tournament championships
- Atlantic 10; 1983, 1985, 1988

The Penn State Nittany Lions softball is the team that represents Pennsylvania State University in NCAA Division I college softball. The team currently participates in the Big Ten Conference. The Nittany Lions are currently led by their head coach Clarisa Crowell. The team play their home games at Beard Field at Nittany Lion Softball Park located on the university's campus.

== History ==
Penn State has played softball continuously since 1965. Like many women's programs, the Nittany Lions were members of the Association for Intercollegiate Athletics for Women from 1971 to 1982, when the NCAA began officially sponsoring softball. Since 2011, the Nittany Lions have played at 1,084-seat Beard Field.

The Nittany Lions joined the Atlantic 10 Conference ahead of the 1983 season and would go on to win the Atlantic 10 softball tournament in 1983, 1985, and 1988. In 1989, Penn State announced plans to join the Big Ten Conference for all sports, beginning softball play in the Big Ten in 1992.

Throughout its history, Penn State has played in 11 NCAA softball tournaments. The Nittany Lions are currently coached by Clarisa Crowell, who took over ahead of the 2021 season.

== Penn State in the NCAA Tournament ==
The NCAA Division I softball tournament started in 1982. The Nittany Lions have played in 11 tournaments, most recently in 2024.

Year	Record	Pct	Notes
1983	0–2	.000	Atlantic Regional
1985	0–2	.000	Northeast Regional
2000	0–1	.000	Regional No. 5
2001	2–2	.500	Regional No. 3
2002	2–2	.500	Regional No. 2
2003	1–2	.333	Regional No. 6
2005	2–1	.500	College Station Regional
2006	2–2	.500	Hempstead Regional
2007	0–2	.000	Columbia Regional
2011	2-2	.500	Hosted University Park Regional
2024	1–2	.333	College Station Regional
TOTALS	13–24	.351	

== Awards ==
Big Ten Coach of the Year

- Robin Petrini, 1999

Big Ten Freshman of the Year

- Bridget Nemeth, 2024

== Current Coaching staff ==
Name	Position coached	Consecutive season at Penn State in current position
Clarisa Crowell	Head coach	4th
Adrianna Baggetta	Assistant Coach	1st
Alexis Gallagher	Assistant Coach	1st
Mysha Sataraka	Assistant Coach	2nd
Haylee Hayward	Director of Operations	1st
