= Iowa Hawkeyes softball =

- 2026
- Founded: 1978
- University: University of Iowa
- Head coach: Stacy May-Johnson (1st season)
- Conference: Big Ten
- Location: Iowa City, Iowa, US
- Home stadium: Bob Pearl Softball Field (capacity: 1,500)
- Nickname: Hawkeyes
- Colors: Black and gold

NCAA WCWS appearances
- 1995, 1996, 1997, 2001

NCAA Tournament appearances
- 1989, 1991, 1993, 1995, 1996, 1997, 1998, 2000, 2001, 2002, 2003, 2004, 2005, 2006, 2008, 2009

Conference tournament championships
- 2001, 2003

Regular-season conference championships
- 1989, 1990, 1997, 2000, 2003

The Iowa Hawkeyes softball team represents University of Iowa in NCAA Division I college softball. The team participates in the Big Ten Conference. The Hawkeyes are currently led by head coach Stacy May-Johnson. The team plays its home games at Bob Pearl Softball Field which is located on the university's campus.

== History ==
=== Coaching history ===
Years	Coach	Record	Ref
1978–1980	Jane Hagedorn		
1981–1987	Ginny Parrish		
1988–2010	Gayle Blevins		
2011–2018	Marla Looper		
2019–2025	Renee Luers-Gillispie		
2026–present	Stacy May-Johnson		

== Championships ==
=== Conference championships ===
Season	Conference	Record	Head coach
1989	Big Ten Conference	17–7	Gayle Blevins
1990	Big Ten Conference	17–7	Gayle Blevins
1997	Big Ten Conference	22–0	Gayle Blevins
2000	Big Ten Conference	14–4	Gayle Blevins
2003	Big Ten Conference	13–4	Gayle Blevins

=== Conference tournament championships ===
Year	Conference	Tournament Location	Head coach
2001	Big Ten	Ann Arbor, MI	Gayle Blevins
2003	Big Ten	Iowa City, IA	Gayle Blevins

== Coaching staff ==
Name	Position coached	Consecutive season at Iowa in current position
Stacy May-Johnson	Head coach	1st
Ally Miklesh	Assistant coach	1st
Fran Strub	Assistant coach	1st
Bobby Alvara	Pitching / Assistant Coach	1st

== Awards ==
Big Ten Player of the Year

- Terri McFarland, 1990
- Karen Jackson, 1991
- Debbie Bilbao, 1997

Big Ten Pitcher of the Year

- Karen Jackson, 1994
- Kristi Hanks, 2000
- Kristi Hanks, 2001
- Lisa Birocci, 2003

Big Ten Freshman of the Year

- Terri McFarland, 1989
- Karren Jackson, 1991
- Kari Knopf, 1994
- Jessica Bashor, 2000
- Stacy May, 2003

Big Ten Coach of the Year

- Gayle Blevins, 1989
- Gayle Blevins, 1997
- Gayle Blevins, 2000
