= Indiana Hoosiers softball =

- Founded: 1974
- University: Indiana University Bloomington
- Head coach: Shonda Stanton (9th season)
- Conference: Big Ten
- Location: Bloomington, Indiana, US
- Home stadium: Andy Mohr Field (capacity: 500)
- Nickname: Hoosiers
- Colors: Crimson and cream

NCAA WCWS appearances
- 1983, 1986

AIAW WCWS appearances
- 1979, 1980

NCAA Tournament appearances
- 1983, 1985, 1986, 1994, 1996, 2006, 2011, 2023, 2024, 2025, 2026

Regular-season conference championships
- 1983, 1986, 1994

The Indiana Hoosiers softball team represents Indiana University Bloomington in NCAA Division I college softball. The team participates in the Big Ten Conference. The Hoosiers are currently led by head coach Shonda Stanton. The team plays its home games at Andy Mohr Field located on the university's campus.

== History ==
=== Coaching history ===
Years	Coach	Record	%
1973–1974	Jenny Johnson		
1975–1976	Louetta Bloecher		
1977–1979	Ann Lawver	70–38	
1980–1987	Gayle Blevins	316–151–3	
1988–2002	Diane Stephenson	402–402–4	
2003–2004	Sara Hayes		
2005–2008	Stacey Phillips		
2009–2017	Michelle Gardner		
2018–Present	Shonda Stanton		

== Championships ==
=== Conference Championships ===
Season	Conference	Record	Head coach
1983	Big Ten Conference	11–4	Gayle Blevins
1986	Big Ten Conference	15–9	Gayle Blevins
1994	Big Ten Conference	23–5	Diane Stephenson

== Coaching staff ==
Name	Position coached	Consecutive season at Indiana in current position
Shonda Stanton	Head coach	6th
Chanda Bell	Associate Coach	6th
Aaron Clopton	Assistant coach	1st
Gabbi Jenkins	Assistant coach	2nd
Grayson Radcliffe	Student Coach	1st

== Awards ==
Big Ten Player of the Year

- Michelle Venturella, 1994
- Taryn Kern, 2023

Big Ten Pitcher of the Year

- Gina Ugo, 1996
- Morgan Melloh, 2011

Big Ten Freshman of the Year

- Tammy Connor, 1985
- Taryn Kern, 2023

Big Ten Coach of the Year

- Diane Stephenson, 1994
