= Carol Hutchins =

American softball coach

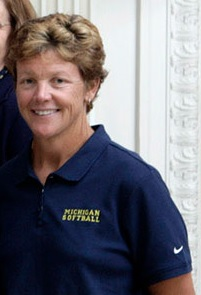
- Hutchins visits the White House in 2005

Biographical details
- Born: May 26, 1957 (age 69); Lansing, Michigan, U.S.

Playing career
- 1976–1979: Michigan State
- Position: Shortstop

Coaching career (HC unless noted)

National Softball
- 1982: Ferris State
- 1983–1984: Michigan (asst.)
- 1985–2022: Michigan

National Softball
- 2005: USA Women's Softball (asst.)
- 2005: USA Women's Softball Elite Team

Head coaching record
- Overall: 1,707–551–5 (.755)

Accomplishments and honors

Championships
- Women's College World Series (2005); 22× Big Ten regular season (1992, 1993, 1995, 1996, 1998, 1999, 2001, 2002, 2004, 2005, 2008–2016, 2018, 2019, 2021); 10× Big Ten tournament (1995–1998, 2000, 2002, 2005, 2006, 2015, 2019)

Awards
- National Fastpitch Coaches Association Hall of Fame (2006); 18× Big Ten Coach of the Year; 9× NFCA Regional Coach of the Year; 2× NFCA National Coach of the Year
Medal record
Assistant Coach for World Cup of Softball
Representing the United States
Silver medal – second place	2005 Oklahoma City
Assistant Coach for Japan Softball Cup
Head Coach for Canada Cup USA Elite Team
Silver medal – second place	2005 South Surrey

Carol Sue Hutchins (born May 26, 1957) is an American former softball coach. In 38 years as the head coach of Michigan Wolverines softball, (1985–2022), she won more games than any other coach in University of Michigan history in any sport, male or female with 1,684 wins. Hutchins had a career record of 1,707 wins, 551 losses, and five ties, for a .759 winning percentage. She led the Wolverines to their first NCAA softball championship in 2005.

On April 2, 2016, Hutchins became the winningest head coach in NCAA Division I Softball history when Michigan defeated Indiana, passing Margie Wright's record of 1,457 career wins. She reclaimed the record as winningest head coach on February 25, 2022, passing Mike Candrea's record of 1,674.

== Softball and basketball player ==
A native of Lansing, Michigan, Hutchins attended Everett High School, where she was an All-City basketball player from 1973 to 1975. Hutchins also played for the Lansing Laurels, an Amateur Softball Association fastpitch team that finished as high as fifth nationally. After graduating from high school, Hutchins attended Michigan State University, where she played on the Spartans varsity basketball and softball teams from 1976 to 1979. Hutchins was a Michigan State starting shortstop as a freshman and helped the Michigan State softball team win an Association for Intercollegiate Athletics for Women (AIAW) National Softball Championship.

== Coaching career ==
After graduating from Michigan State in 1979, Hutchins attended Indiana University Bloomington where she received a master's degree in physical education in 1981. She began her coaching career as an assistant coach for Indiana Hoosiers softball in 1981 and next became the head coach for the Ferris State Bulldogs softball in 1982. In 1983, she was hired as an assistant coach at the University of Michigan, a position she held from 1983 to 1984.

She became the head coach of the Michigan Wolverines softball team in 1985. When she took over as head coach, Hutchins reportedly "had a tiny salary, an only slightly larger budget, and had to take care of her own field, throwing down lime and riding the lawn tractor." Hutchins joked that there is still a dent in the fence from a day the tractor "just went wild." Since Hutchins became Michigan's coach, the team has never had a losing season.

Hutchins' teams have won 22 Big Ten Conference regular-season titles, nine Big Ten Conference softball tournament titles, and 18 National Collegiate Athletic Association (NCAA) regional championships. She has been named Big Ten Coach of the Year on 18 occasions, National Fastpitch Coaches Association (NFCA) Regional Coach of the Year nine times, and NFCA National Coach of the Year twice.

She led the Michigan softball team to its first (NCAA) Women's College World Series championship in 2005. The 2005 Michigan Wolverines softball team was the first team from East of the Mississippi River to win the Women's College World Series. The Ann Arbor News described the team's accomplishment this way:

"What happened during the past five months might be the most unlikely accomplishment in the history of a storied athletics program, analogous to setting out to win an NCAA hockey title at the University of New Mexico. Then doing it. Now, before you dismiss that as hyperbole, consider a few factors. Like the fact that, because of cold weather, the Wolverines played their first 33 games on the road, roughly half the season. Try doing that in football or basketball. Then there's recruiting. Softball is still a sport dominated by West Coast talent. ... There's a reason no team East of the Mississippi had won an NCAA softball title until now."

After Michigan defeated No. 1 ranked Arizona in March 2005, Hutchins told a reporter, "Yes, there is softball east of the Rockies." The performance of the 2005 team also set Michigan records in several categories:

- The team's 65 victories was the most in program history.
- The team recorded 32 consecutive victories between February 13, 2005, and March 30, 2005.
- The team's 103 home runs tied for the second most in NCAA history.
- The team's first No. 1 seed in the NCAA Tournament.

After winning the World Series, Hutchins and her team visited the White House in July 2005, where they met with President George W. Bush, something Hutchins called "a once-in-a-lifetime experience."

In March 2000, she recorded her 638th win, giving her more career wins than any other coach in University of Michigan history in any sport, male or female. In 2007, she became the seventh coach in NCAA softball history, and the first in any sport at the University of Michigan, to reach 1,000 career wins. After winning her 1,000th game, Hutchins told a reporter that her greatest pride did not come from the 1,000 wins, but from her ability to influence how her players look at life, "to get them to work together and to meet standards, to show them they can lead as women." When she was inducted into the NFCA Hall of Fame, her players presented her with a scrapbook with a note from one saying, "I came here a girl with potential and left here a woman with no limits." Hutchins noted that those 15 words matter more than the 1,000 wins.

On October 4, 2017, Hutchins signed a five-year contract extension with the Wolverines.

On February 25, 2022, Hutchins reclaimed the record as the winningest coach in NCAA Division I history, passing Mike Candrea's record of 1,674. On May 1, 2022, she became the first softball coach to reach the 1,700 wins milestone.

On August 24, 2022, Hutchins announced her retirement after 38 years as head coach at Michigan. At the time of her retirement, she was the winningest coach in NCAA Division I history with a record of 1,707–555–5. During her career as head coach, Michigan never suffered a losing season, and she led the team to 22 Big Ten regular-season titles from 1995 to 2021, including nine in a row from 2008 to 2016, 10 Big Ten Tournament championships, and qualified for the NCAA Tournament 29 times, including each of the last 27 years.

== Honors and personal life ==
In 2000 Hutchins was inducted into the Greater Lansing Sports Hall of Fame. In 2006, she was inducted into the National Fastpitch Coaches Association Hall of Fame. In 2011, she was inducted into the Michigan Sports Hall of Fame. She was inducted into the Michigan Women's Hall of Fame in 2022.

Hutchins is an avid mountain biker and runner, and continued playing organized softball and hockey until 1998.

== Head coaching record ==
Record table
Season	Team	Overall	Conference	Standing	Postseason
Ferris State Bulldogs (Great Lakes Intercollegiate Athletic Conference) (1982–1982)
1982	Ferris State	23–11	10–0	1st	
Ferris State:		23–11 (.676)	10–0 (1.000)		
Michigan Wolverines (Big Ten Conference) (1985–present)
1985	Michigan	28–20	16–8	2nd	
1986	Michigan	32–17	12–12	5th	
1987	Michigan	39–17	17–7	2nd	
1988	Michigan	29–20	15–9	2nd	
1989	Michigan	42–20	16–8	2nd	
1990	Michigan	29–27	12–12	4th	
1991	Michigan	36–19	15–9	3rd	
1992	Michigan	37–24	22–6	1st	NCAA Regional
1993	Michigan	46–13	21–5	1st	NCAA Regional
1994	Michigan	34–26	18–10	T–3rd	
1995	Michigan	50–12	22–6	1st	Women's College World Series
1996	Michigan	51–14	20–4	1st	Women's College World Series
1997	Michigan	56–16–1	18–4	2nd	Women's College World Series
1998	Michigan	56–7	22–1	1st	Women's College World Series
1999	Michigan	51–13–1	21–3	1st	NCAA Regional
2000	Michigan	45–16–1	13–4	2nd	NCAA Regional
2001	Michigan	43–17–1	17–3	1st	Women's College World Series
2002	Michigan	50–11	15–3	1st	Women's College World Series
2003	Michigan	44–16	13–5	2nd	NCAA Regional
2004	Michigan	54–13	17–3	1st	Women's College World Series
2005	Michigan	65–7	15–2	1st	Women's College World Series Champion
2006	Michigan	44–15	14–4	2nd	Knoxville Super Regional
2007	Michigan	47–13	12–4	3rd	Waco Super Regional
2008	Michigan	52–8	18–2	T–1st	Ann Arbor Super Regional
2009	Michigan	47–12	17–3	1st	Women's College World Series
2010	Michigan	49–8	18–1	1st	Ann Arbor Super Regional
2011	Michigan	53–6	18–2	1st	Ann Arbor Regional
2012	Michigan	42–17	18–5	1st	Tuscaloosa Super Regional
2013	Michigan	51–13	20–2	1st	Women's College World Series
2014	Michigan	47–15	18–5	T–1st	Tallahassee Super Regional
2015	Michigan	60–8	21–2	1st	Women's College World Series Runner-up
2016	Michigan	52–7	21–2	1st	Women's College World Series
2017	Michigan	43–13–1	20–3	2nd	Seattle Regional
2018	Michigan	44–13	18–3	1st	Lexington Regional
2019	Michigan	45–13	22–1	1st	Ann Arbor Regional
2020	Michigan	15–8	0–0		Season cancelled due to COVID-19
2021	Michigan	38–8	36–6	1st	Seattle Regional
2022	Michigan	38–18	14–8	4th	Orlando Regional
Michigan:		1,684–540–5 (.757)	662–177 (.789)		
Total:		1,707–551–5 (.755)			
National champion Postseason invitational champion Conference regular season champion Conference regular season and conference tournament champion Division regular season champion Division regular season and conference tournament champion Conference tournament champion

== See also ==
- List of college softball coaches with 1,000 wins
- National Fastpitch Coaches Association Hall of Fame
