= List of Northwestern Wildcats softball seasons =

This is a list of Northwestern Wildcats softball seasons. The Northwestern Wildcats softball program is a college softball team that represents Northwestern University in the Big Ten Conference of the National Collegiate Athletic Association.

The Wildcats have won ten conference regular season championships, ten conference tournaments, and have appeared in the NCAA Division I softball tournament 28 times, advancing to the Women's College World Series eight times, and the title game in 1985.

== Season results ==
National champions	Women's College World Series berth	NCAA Tournament berth	Conference Tournament Champions	Conference Regular Season Champions

Season	Head coach	Conference	Season results									Tournament results	
Season	Head coach	Conference	Overall				Conference					Conference (Note: The Big Ten softball tournament has been played in 1982, 1995–2008, 2013–2019, and 2022–present.)	Postseason
Season	Head coach	Conference	Wins	Losses	Ties	%	Wins	Losses	Ties	%	Finish	Conference	Postseason
Northwestern Wildcats
1976	Mary Conway	Independent	1	6	0	.143	N/A						—
1977	Mary Conway	Big Ten	3	9	0	.250	1	4	0	.200		N/A	—
1978	Mary Conway	Big Ten	6	12	0	.333	0	4	0	.000		N/A	—
1979	Sharon Drysdale	Big Ten	3	13	0	.188	0	4	0	.000		N/A	—
1980	Sharon Drysdale	Big Ten	16	17	0	.485	3	5	0	.375		N/A	—
1981	Sharon Drysdale	Big Ten	19	27	0	.413	4	4	0	.500		N/A	—
1982	Sharon Drysdale	Big Ten	31	9	1	.768	8	0	0	1.000	1st	champions	—
1983	Sharon Drysdale	Big Ten	34	16	0	.680	13	7	0	.650	2nd	N/A	
1984	Sharon Drysdale	Big Ten	41	17	0	.707	17	4	0	.810	1st	N/A	WCWS
1985	Sharon Drysdale	Big Ten	40	12	1	.764	20	4	0	.833	1st	N/A	WCWS
1986	Sharon Drysdale	Big Ten	33	17	0	.660	15	9	0	.625	1st	N/A	WCWS
1987	Sharon Drysdale	Big Ten	43	13	0	.768	18	6	0	.750	1st	N/A	NCAA Regional
1988	Sharon Drysdale	Big Ten	25	23	0	.521	14	10	0	.583	3rd	N/A	—
1989	Sharon Drysdale	Big Ten	26	25	0	.929	14	10	0	.583	3rd	N/A	—
1990	Sharon Drysdale	Big Ten	16	35	0	.314	5	19	0	.208	6th	N/A	—
1991	Sharon Drysdale	Big Ten	21	33	0	.389	9	15	0	.375	5th	N/A	—
1992	Sharon Drysdale	Big Ten	33	25	1	.568	18	10	0	.643	3rd	N/A	—
1993	Sharon Drysdale	Big Ten	34	25	0	.576	17	11	0	.607	4th	N/A	—
1994	Sharon Drysdale	Big Ten	35	21	0	.625	17	11	0	.607	4th	N/A	—
1995	Sharon Drysdale	Big Ten	38	19	0	.667	19	9	0	.679	2nd	3rd	—
1996	Sharon Drysdale	Big Ten	19	33	0	.365	8	16	0	.333	7th	—	—
1997	Sharon Drysdale	Big Ten	19	31	0	.380	9	14	0	.391	8th	—	—
1998	Sharon Drysdale	Big Ten	34	19	0	.642	15	9	0	.625	2nd	4th	—
1999	Sharon Drysdale	Big Ten	30	31	0	.492	11	13	0	.458	7th	—	—
2000	Sharon Drysdale	Big Ten	30	26	0	.536	12	6	0	.667	4th	4th	NCAA Regional
2001	Sharon Drysdale	Big Ten	20	25	0	.444	8	12	0	.400	8th	—	—
2002	Kate Drohan	Big Ten	24	18	1	.570	10	9	0	.526	T-5th	—	—
2003	Kate Drohan	Big Ten	36	19	0	.655	11	9	0	.550	6th	2nd	NCAA Regional
2004	Kate Drohan	Big Ten	34	20	0	.630	12	8	0	.600	4th	3rd	NCAA Regional
2005	Kate Drohan	Big Ten	42	18	0	.700	15	3	0	.833	2nd	3rd	NCAA Super Regional
2006	Kate Drohan	Big Ten	50	15	0	.769	16	3	0	.842	1st	2nd	WCWS runner-up
2007	Kate Drohan	Big Ten	52	13	0	.800	15	3	0	.833	2nd	2nd	WCWS
2008	Kate Drohan	Big Ten	40	16	0	.714	18	2	0	.900	T-1st	champions	NCAA Super Regional
2009	Kate Drohan	Big Ten	31	15	0	.674	14	6	0	.700	3rd	N/A	NCAA Regional
2010	Kate Drohan	Big Ten	25	23	0	.521	10	8	0	.556	4th	N/A	—
2011	Kate Drohan	Big Ten	23	20	0	.535	5	13	0	.278	10th	N/A	—
2012	Kate Drohan	Big Ten	29	29	0	.500	14	10	0	.583	4th	N/A	NCAA Regional
2013	Kate Drohan	Big Ten	31	22	0	.585	12	10	0	.545	5th	5th	—
2014	Kate Drohan	Big Ten	35	18	0	.660	14	9	0	.609	5th	5th	NCAA Regional
2015	Kate Drohan	Big Ten	28	23	0	.549	14	8	0	.636	4th	3rd	NCAA Regional
2016	Kate Drohan	Big Ten	27	28	0	.491	15	8	0	.652	3rd	3rd	NCAA Regional
2017	Kate Drohan	Big Ten	25	29	0	.463	10	13	0	.435	8th	5th	—
2018	Kate Drohan	Big Ten	38	19	0	.667	14	8	0	.636	4th	2nd	NCAA Regional
2019	Kate Drohan	Big Ten	47	13	0	.783	21	2	0	.913	2nd	3rd	NCAA Super Regional
2020	Kate Drohan	Big Ten	11	12	0	.478	Season canceled due to COVID-19 pandemic						
2021	Kate Drohan	Big Ten	30	17	0	.638	29	15	0	.659	3rd	N/A	NCAA Regional
2022	Kate Drohan	Big Ten	45	13	0	.776	19	4	0	.826	1st	3rd	WCWS
2023	Kate Drohan	Big Ten	42	13	0	.764	20	3	0	.870	1st	champions	NCAA Super Regional
2024	Kate Drohan	Big Ten	35	13	0	.729	19	3	0	.864	1st	5th	NCAA Regional
2025	Kate Drohan	Big Ten	30	20	1	.598	16	6	0	.727	T-4th	9th	NCAA Regional
2026	Kate Drohan	Big Ten	29	21	0	.580	16	8	0	.667	T-5th	9th	—
