= 2015 Big Ten softball tournament =

College softball tournament in Ohio

- Teams: 12
- Format: Single-elimination
- Finals site: Buckeye Field; Columbus, Ohio
- Champions: Michigan (9th title)
- Runner-up: Nebraska (1st title game)
- Winning coach: Carol Hutchins (9th title)
- MVP: Sierra Romero (Michigan)
- Television: BTN

The 2015 Big Ten softball tournament was held at Buckeye Field on the campus of Ohio State University in Columbus, Ohio from May 7 through May 9, 2015. As the tournament winner, Michigan earned the Big Ten Conference's automatic bid to the 2015 NCAA Division I softball tournament. All but the first two games of the tournament aired on BTN. The first two games were streamed online on BTN+.

== Tournament ==
2015 Big Ten Conference softball standings
	Conf.				Overall
Team	W		L	PCT	W		L	PCT
No. 2 Michigan ‍†‍‡‍^{y}	21	–	2	.913	60	–	8	.882
No. 15 Minnesota ‍‍‍^{y}	20	–	3	.870	49	–	11	.817
Nebraska ‍‍‍^{y}	17	–	6	.739	35	–	23	.603
Northwestern ‍‍‍^{y}	14	–	8	.636	28	–	23	.549
Illinois ‍‍‍	14	–	9	.609	26	–	27	.491
Ohio State ‍‍‍	12	–	11	.522	30	–	22	.577
Rutgers ‍‍‍	11	–	12	.478	29	–	20	.592
Penn State ‍‍‍	9	–	14	.391	29	–	28	.509
Maryland ‍‍‍	9	–	14	.391	27	–	27	.500
Iowa ‍‍‍	8	–	15	.348	19	–	40	.322
Purdue ‍‍‍	7	–	14	.333	31	–	25	.554
Indiana ‍‍‍	7	–	14	.333	17	–	39	.304
Wisconsin ‍‍‍	5	–	17	.227	21	–	31	.404
Michigan State ‍‍‍	4	–	19	.174	19	–	36	.345
† – Conference champion ‡ – Tournament champion y – Invited to the NCAA tournament As of June 5, 2015; Rankings from NFCA

1st Round; May 7th BTN+ & BTN
8	Maryland	6
9	Penn State	10
5	Illinois	2
12	Purdue	3
7	Rutgers	3
10	Iowa	5
6	Ohio State	24
11	Indiana	1^{(5)}

Quarterfinals; May 8th BTN
1	Michigan	16
9	Penn State	1^{(5)}
4	Northwestern	3
12	Purdue	0
2	Minnesota	0
10	Iowa	2
3	Nebraska	5
6	Ohio State	2

Semifinals; May 9th BTN
1	Michigan	9
4	Northwestern	0^{(5)}
10	Iowa	6
3	Nebraska	9

Finals; May 9th BTN
1	Michigan	6
3	Nebraska	1

- All times listed are Eastern Daylight Time.
- Only the top 12 participate in the tournament, therefore Wisconsin and Michigan State were not eligible to play.

=== Announcers ===
Thursday

- Matt McGreevy & Ryan Reese

Friday

- Lisa Byington & Carol Bruggeman (Early)
- Andy Masur & Jennie Ritter (Late)

Saturday

- Lisa Byington & Carol Bruggeman

== Notes ==
- Ohio State's 24 runs is a tournament record
