= Piper Ritter =

American softball coach and player

Biographical details
- Born: April 7, 1983 (age 43); Farmington, New Mexico, U.S.

Playing career
- 2001–2004: Minnesota
- Position: Pitcher

Coaching career (HC unless noted)
- 2005: North St. Paul HS (asst.)
- 2006: Northern Colorado (asst.)
- 2008–2020: Minnesota (asst.)
- 2021–2026: Minnesota

Head coaching record
- Overall: 160–149–1 (.518)

Accomplishments and honors

Championships
- As an Assistant: Big Ten Conference Regular Season Champions (2017); 4× Big Ten softball tournament Champions (2014, 2016, 2017, 2018)

Awards
- Minnesota Softball Hall of Fame (2008); As a Player: All-Big Ten First Team (2003); 3× All-Big Ten Third Team (2001, 2002, 2004); 2× NFCA Mideast All-Regional First Team (2002, 2004); NFCA Mideast All-Regional Second Team (2003)

Piper Marten Ritter (born April 7, 1983) is an American, former collegiate softball pitcher and former head coach at Minnesota. Ritter played college softball at Minnesota from 2001 to 2004, and was named a four-time All-Big Ten Conference honoree. She is the school's career leader in WHIP. Ritter was undrafted and played one season in the National Pro Fastpitch in 2005 with the defunct Texas Thunder.

== Early life ==
Ritter played at Farmington High School and led the Lady Scorpions to a state title and was named the 2000 Gatorade New Mexico Player of The Year. She also played as a third baseman.

== Coaching career ==
=== Minnesota ===
Ritter served as an assistant coach at Minnesota for 13 seasons under four different head coaches.

On May 3, 2020, Ritter was named the head coach of Minnesota.

On May 8, 2026, Minnesota parted ways with Ritter.

== Statistics ==
=== Minnesota Gophers ===
YEAR	W	L	GP	GS	CG	SHO	SV	IP	H	R	ER	BB	SO	ERA	WHIP
2001	23	11	49	29	20	7	4	226.2	123	43	26	65	249	0.80	0.83
2002	23	14	45	33	18	8	4	235.2	131	52	37	49	301	1.10	0.76
2003	21	13	43	32	21	11	2	239.1	142	58	48	42	311	1.40	0.77
2004	21	13	36	30	26	7	2	219.2	136	46	31	57	261	0.99	0.88
TOTALS	88	51	173	124	85	33	12	921.1	532	199	142	213	1122	1.08	0.81

== Head coaching record ==
=== College ===
Record table
Season	Team	Overall	Conference	Standing	Postseason
Minnesota Golden Gophers (Big Ten Conference) (2021–2026)
2021	Minnesota	31–13	29–11	2nd	NCAA Regional
2022	Minnesota	27–26–1	11–12	9th	NCAA Regional
2023	Minnesota	38–19	17–6	3rd	NCAA Regional
2024	Minnesota	28–25	13–10	5th	
2025	Minnesota	20–30	5–17	15th	
2026	Minnesota	16–36	7–17	T-12th	
Minnesota:		160–149–1 (.518)	82–73 (.529)		
Total:		160–149–1 (.518)			
National champion Postseason invitational champion Conference regular season champion Conference regular season and conference tournament champion Division regular season champion Division regular season and conference tournament champion Conference tournament champion
