= 2008 Big Ten softball tournament =

College softball tournament in Illinois

- Teams: 8
- Format: Single-elimination tournament
- Finals site: Sharon J. Drysdale Field; Evanston, IL
- Champions: Northwestern (1st title)
- Runner-up: Iowa (8th title game)
- Winning coach: Kate Drohan (1st title)
- MVP: Lauren Delaney (Northwestern)

2008 Big Ten Conference softball standings
| | Conf. | | | | Overall |
| Team | W | | L | PCT | W | | L | PCT |
|---|---|---|---|---|---|---|---|---|
| No. 9 Michigan ‍†‍‍^{y} | 18 | – | 2 | .900 | 52 | – | 8 | .867 |
| No. 12 Northwestern ‍‍‡‍^{y} | 18 | – | 2 | .900 | 40 | – | 16 | .714 |
| Iowa ‍‍‍^{y} | 14 | – | 6 | .700 | 42 | – | 20 | .677 |
| Minnesota ‍‍‍ | 9 | – | 7 | .563 | 29 | – | 16 | .644 |
| Purdue ‍‍‍^{y} | 9 | – | 9 | .500 | 35 | – | 23 | .603 |
| Illinois ‍‍‍ | 8 | – | 12 | .400 | 30 | – | 32 | .484 |
| Michigan State ‍‍‍ | 8 | – | 12 | .400 | 27 | – | 29 | .482 |
| Ohio State ‍‍‍ | 7 | – | 13 | .350 | 33 | – | 23 | .589 |
| Penn State ‍‍‍ | 6 | – | 12 | .333 | 34 | – | 22 | .607 |
| Indiana ‍‍‍ | 6 | – | 14 | .300 | 16 | – | 35 | .314 |
| Wisconsin ‍‍‍ | 3 | – | 17 | .150 | 15 | – | 40 | .273 |
† – Conference champion ‡ – Tournament champion y – Invited to the NCAA tournament As of May 25, 2008; Rankings from NFCA

The 2008 Big Ten softball tournament was held at Sharon J. Drysdale Field on the campus of Northwestern University in Evanston, Illinois from May 8 through May 10, 2008. As the tournament winner, Northwestern earned the Big Ten Conference's automatic bid to the 2008 NCAA Division I softball tournament.

== Format and seeding ==
The 2008 tournament was an eight team single-elimination tournament. The top eight teams based on conference regular season winning percentage earned invites to the tournament. After all tiebreakers between Michigan and Northwestern came out equal, the Wildcats won the official coin flip which was conducted by Big Ten Conference officials to determine this year's host. This was the first time in the tournament's history that the top-seeded team was decided by a coin flip.

== Bracket ==
Quarterfinals; May 8 and May 9
1 | Northwestern | 8
8 | Ohio State | 0
4 | Minnesota | 5
5 | Purdue | 4
2 | Michigan | 1
7 | Michigan State | 2
3 | Iowa | 9
6 | Illinois | 1

Semifinals; May 9
1 | Northwestern | 12
4 | Minnesota | 0
7 | Michigan State | 4
3 | Iowa | 13

Championship; May 10
1 | Northwestern | 1
3 | Iowa | 0

== Schedule ==
| Game | Time* | Matchup^{#} | Attendance |
Quarterfinals – May 8 and 9
| 1 | 2:00 p.m. | #2 Michigan vs. #7 Michigan State | – |
| 2 | 4:30 p.m. | #1 Northwestern vs. #8 Ohio State | – |
| 3 | 9:00 a.m. | #3 Iowa vs. #6 Illinois | – |
| 4 | 11:30 a.m. | #4 Minnesota vs. #5 Purdue | – |
Semifinals – May 9
| 5 | 2:00 p.m. | #3 Iowa vs. #7 Michigan State | – |
| 6 | 4:30 p.m. | #1 Northwestern vs. #4 Minnesota | – |
Championship – May 10
| 7 | 12:00 p.m. | #1 Northwestern vs. #3 Iowa | – |
*Game times in CDT. # – Rankings denote tournament seed.

== All-Tournament Team ==
- Michelle Batts (Northwestern)
- Jessica Bracamonte (Michigan State)
- Katie Brown (Iowa)
- Lindsay Digmann (Iowa)
- Lauren Delaney (Northwestern)
- Erin Dyer (Northwestern)
- Colleen McGlaughlin (Iowa)
- Quinn Morelock (Iowa)
- Natalie Neal (Minnesota)
- Kelly Quinn (Northwestern)
- Brianna Sudenga (Minnesota)
- Kara Weigle (Michigan State)

=== Tournament MVP ===
- Lauren Delaney (Northwestern)
