= 2017 Big Ten softball tournament =

College softball tournament in Michigan

- Teams: 12
- Format: Single-elimination
- Finals site: Wilpon Complex; Ann Arbor, Michigan
- Champions: Minnesota (4th title)
- Runner-up: Ohio State (3rd title game)
- Winning coach: Jessica Allister (3rd title)
- MVP: Sara Groenewegen (Minnesota)
- Television: Big Ten Network

The 2017 Big Ten softball tournament was held at Wilpon Complex on the campus of University of Michigan in Ann Arbor, Michigan, from May 11 through May 13, 2017. As the tournament winner, Minnesota earned the Big Ten Conference's automatic bid to the 2017 NCAA Division I softball tournament. All games of the tournament aired on BTN.

== Tournament ==
2017 Big Ten Conference softball standings
	Conf.						Overall
Team	W		L		T	PCT	W		L		T	PCT
No. 2 Minnesota‡ ‍‍‍	22	–	1	–	0	.957	51	–	3	–	0	.944
No. 17 Michigan ‍‍‍	20	–	3	–	0	.870	41	–	10	–	1	.798
Ohio State ‍‍‍	15	–	8	–	0	.652	33	–	15	–	0	.688
Illinois ‍‍‍	14	–	8	–	0	.636	36	–	17	–	0	.679
Nebraska ‍‍‍	13	–	10	–	0	.565	24	–	29	–	0	.453
Wisconsin ‍‍‍	11	–	11	–	0	.500	33	–	14	–	0	.702
Michigan State ‍‍‍	11	–	12	–	0	.478	30	–	21	–	0	.588
Northwestern ‍‍‍	10	–	13	–	0	.435	25	–	28	–	0	.472
Indiana ‍‍‍	9	–	14	–	0	.391	23	–	31	–	0	.426
Iowa ‍‍‍	9	–	14	–	0	.391	19	–	32	–	0	.373
Purdue ‍‍‍	9	–	14	–	0	.391	20	–	36	–	0	.357
Penn State ‍‍‍	8	–	15	–	0	.348	23	–	32	–	0	.418
Rutgers ‍‍‍	5	–	18	–	0	.217	14	–	37	–	0	.275
Maryland ‍‍‍	4	–	19	–	0	.174	11	–	39	–	1	.225
‡ – Tournament champion As of May 9, 2017; Rankings from NFCA

1st Round; May 11th BTN
8	Northwestern	6
9	Purdue	1
5	Nebraska	0
12	Penn State	5
7	Michigan State	8
10	Indiana	7
6	Wisconsin	3
11	Iowa	0

Quarterfinals; May 12th BTN
1	Minnesota	5
8	Northwestern	1
4	Illinois	3
12	Penn State	0
2	Michigan	4
7	Michigan State	5
3	Ohio State	3
6	Wisconsin	2

Semifinals; May 13th BTN
1	Minnesota	6
4	Illinois	5
7	Michigan State	3
3	Ohio State	4

Finals; May 13th BTN
1	Minnesota	6
3	Ohio State	0

- Only the top 12 participate in the tournament, therefore Rutgers and Maryland were not eligible to play.
