= 2014 Big Ten softball tournament =

College softball tournament in Illinois

- Teams: 12
- Format: Single-elimination
- Finals site: Sharon J. Drysdale Field; Evanston, IL
- Champions: Minnesota (2nd title)
- Runner-up: Michigan (12th title game)
- Winning coach: Jessica Allister (1st title)
- MVP: Kaitlyn Richardson (Minnesota)
- Television: BTN

The 2014 Big Ten softball tournament was held at Sharon J. Drysdale Field on the campus of Northwestern University in Evanston, Illinois from May 8 through May 10, 2014. As the tournament winner, Minnesota earned the Big Ten Conference's automatic bid to the 2014 NCAA Division I softball tournament.

== Tournament ==
2014 Big Ten Conference softball standings
	Conf.				Overall
Team	W		L	PCT	W		L	PCT
No. 10 Michigan ‍†‍‍^{y}	18	–	5	.783	47	–	15	.758
No. 16 Nebraska ‍‍‍^{y}	18	–	5	.783	44	–	18	.710
No. 15 Minnesota ‍‍‡‍^{y}	16	–	6	.727	44	–	12	.786
Wisconsin ‍‍‍^{y}	14	–	7	.667	36	–	20	.643
Northwestern ‍‍‍^{y}	14	–	9	.609	35	–	18	.660
Ohio State ‍‍‍^{y}	13	–	10	.565	30	–	25	.545
Purdue ‍‍‍	13	–	10	.565	27	–	28	.491
Iowa ‍‍‍^{y}	9	–	14	.391	16	–	30	.348
Illinois ‍‍‍	7	–	16	.304	24	–	26	.480
Indiana ‍‍‍	5	–	18	.217	17	–	39	.304
Penn State ‍‍‍	5	–	18	.217	14	–	35	.286
Michigan State ‍‍‍	4	–	19	.174	12	–	37	.245
† – Conference champion ‡ – Tournament champion y – Invited to the NCAA tournament As of May 25, 2014; Rankings from NFCA

1st Round; May 8
8	Iowa	0
9	Illinois	6
5	Northwestern	10
12	Michigan State	4
7	Ohio State	6
10	Penn State	2
6	Purdue	4
11	Indiana	2

Quarterfinals; May 9
1	Michigan	8
9	Illinois	2
4	Wisconsin	5
5	Northwestern	4
2	Nebraska	5^{(8)}
7	Ohio State	7
3	Minnesota	6
6	Purdue	3

Semifinals; May 10
1	Michigan	4
4	Wisconsin	3
7	Ohio State	0^{(5)}
3	Minnesota	9

Finals; May 10
1	Michigan	2
3	Minnesota	3

== Schedule ==
Game	Time*	Matchup^{#}	Attendance
First Round – Thursday, May 8
1	11:00 a.m.	#6 Purdue vs. #11 Indiana	–
2	1:30 p.m.	#7 Ohio State vs. #10 Penn State	–
3	4:30 p.m.	#8 Iowa vs. #9 Illinois	–
4	7:00 p.m.	#5 Northwestern vs. #12 Michigan State	–
Quarterfinals – Friday, May 9
5	11:00 a.m.	#3 Minnesota vs. #6 Purdue	–
6	1:30 p.m.	#2 Nebraska vs. #7 Ohio State	–
7	4:30 p.m.	#1 Michigan vs. #9 Illinois	–
8	7:00 p.m.	#4 Wisconsin vs. #5 Northwestern	–
Semifinals – Saturday, May 10
9	2:30 p.m.	#3 Minnesota vs. #7 Ohio State	–
10	5:00 p.m.	#1 Michigan vs. #4 Wisconsin	–
Championship – Saturday, May 10
11	7:00 p.m.	#1 Michigan vs. #3 Minnesota	–
*Game times in CDT. # – Rankings denote tournament seed.

== All-Tournament Team ==
- Alex Booker (Illinois)
- Tori Chiodo (Purdue)
- Caitlin Conrad (Ohio State)
- Andrea Filler (Northwestern)
- Mary Massei (Wisconsin)
- Stephanie Peace (Wisconsin)
- Sierra Romero (Michigan)
- Caitlin Blanchard (Michigan)
- Lindsay Montemarano (Michigan)
- Sara Moulton (Minnesota)
- Tyler Walker (Minnesota)

=== Tournament MVP ===
- Kaitlyn Richardson (Minnesota)
