= 2016 Big Ten softball tournament =

College softball tournament in Pennsylvania

- Teams: 12
- Format: Single-elimination
- Finals site: Beard Field; State College, Pennsylvania
- Champions: Minnesota (3rd title)
- Runner-up: Michigan (14th title game)
- Winning coach: Jessica Allister (2nd title)
- MVP: Sara Groenewegen (Minnesota)
- Television: BTN

The 2016 Big Ten softball tournament was held at Beard Field on the campus of Penn State University in State College, Pennsylvania from May 12 through May 14, 2016. As the tournament winner, Minnesota earned the Big Ten Conference's automatic bid to the 2016 NCAA Division I softball tournament. All tournament games aired on BTN.

== Tournament ==
2016 Big Ten Conference softball standings
	Conf.				Overall
Team	W		L	PCT	W		L	PCT
No. 5 Michigan ‍†‍‍^{y}	21	–	2	.913	52	–	7	.881
No. 20 Minnesota ‍‍‡‍^{y}	19	–	3	.864	43	–	14	.754
Northwestern ‍‍‍^{y}	15	–	8	.652	27	–	28	.491
Penn State ‍‍‍	14	–	9	.609	30	–	24	.556
Nebraska ‍‍‍^{y}	13	–	9	.591	35	–	21	.625
Ohio State ‍‍‍^{y}	13	–	9	.591	34	–	20	.630
Illinois ‍‍‍^{y}	12	–	11	.522	36	–	23	.610
Wisconsin ‍‍‍	11	–	11	.500	28	–	24	.538
Indiana ‍‍‍	10	–	13	.435	29	–	25	.537
Michigan State ‍‍‍	8	–	15	.348	27	–	28	.491
Purdue ‍‍‍	8	–	15	.348	27	–	28	.491
Rutgers ‍‍‍	8	–	15	.348	24	–	33	.421
Maryland ‍‍‍	4	–	19	.174	12	–	40	.231
Iowa ‍‍‍	3	–	20	.130	13	–	39	.250
† – Conference champion ‡ – Tournament champion y – Invited to the NCAA tournament As of June 6, 2016; Rankings from NFCA

1st Round; May 12th BTN
8	Wisconsin	0
9	Indiana	4
5	Nebraska	8
12	Purdue	0^{(5)}
7	Illinois	3
10	Michigan State	2
6	Ohio State	5
11	Rutgers	0

Quarterfinals; May 13th BTN
1	Michigan	10
9	Indiana	0
4	Penn State	8
5	Nebraska	7
2	Minnesota	2
7	Illinois	0
3	Northwestern	3
6	Ohio State	1

Semifinals; May 14th BTN
1	Michigan	6
4	Penn State	1
2	Minnesota	8
3	Northwestern	4

Finals; May 14th BTN
1	Michigan	3
2	Minnesota	4^{(10)}

- All times listed are Eastern Daylight Time.
- Only the top 12 participate in the tournament, therefore Maryland and Iowa were not eligible to play.

=== Announcers ===
- Lisa Byington & Carol Bruggeman (Early- Thurs, Fri & All Sat)
- Dean Linke & Jennie Ritter (Late- Thurs, Fri)
