= 2013 Big Ten softball tournament =

College softball tournament in Nebraska

- Teams: 12
- Format: Single-elimination
- Finals site: Bowlin Stadium; Lincoln, NE
- Champions: Wisconsin (1st title)
- Runner-up: Minnesota (3rd title game)
- Winning coach: Yvette Healy (1st title)
- MVP: Cassandra Darrah (Wisconsin)
- Television: BTN

The 2013 Big Ten softball tournament was held at Bowlin Stadium on the campus of University of Nebraska–Lincoln in Lincoln, Nebraska from May 9 through May 12, 2013. As the tournament winner, Wisconsin earned the Big Ten Conference's automatic bid to the 2013 NCAA Division I softball tournament.

== Tournament ==
2013 Big Ten Conference softball standings
	Conf.				Overall
Team	W		L	PCT	W		L	PCT
No. 6 Michigan ‍†‍‍^{y}	20	–	2	.909	51	–	13	.797
No. 8 Nebraska ‍‍‍^{y}	16	–	6	.727	45	–	16	.738
Minnesota ‍‍‍^{y}	14	–	6	.700	36	–	19	.655
Wisconsin ‍‍‡‍^{y}	16	–	7	.696	44	–	13	.772
Northwestern ‍‍‍	12	–	10	.545	31	–	22	.585
Illinois ‍‍‍	11	–	12	.478	22	–	27	.449
Michigan State ‍‍‍	9	–	10	.474	24	–	25	.490
Ohio State ‍‍‍	10	–	13	.435	34	–	22	.607
Iowa ‍‍‍	8	–	15	.348	30	–	24	.556
Purdue ‍‍‍	8	–	15	.348	23	–	32	.418
Penn State ‍‍‍	5	–	17	.227	16	–	34	.320
Indiana ‍‍‍	3	–	19	.136	19	–	35	.352
† – Conference champion ‡ – Tournament champion y – Invited to the NCAA tournament As of June 2, 2013; Rankings from NFCA

1st Round; May 9
8	Ohio State	8
9	Iowa	4
5	Northwestern	6
12	Indiana	3
7	Michigan State	5
10	Purdue	8
6	Illinois	2
11	Penn State	5

Quarterfinals; May 10
1	Michigan	3
8	Ohio State	2
4	Wisconsin	3
5	Northwestern	0
2	Nebraska	3
10	Purdue	2
3	Minnesota	4
11	Penn State	0

Semifinals; May 11
1	Michigan	3
4	Wisconsin	9
2	Nebraska	0
3	Minnesota	1

Finals; May 12
4	Wisconsin	9
3	Minnesota	3

== Schedule ==
Game	Time*	Matchup^{#}	Attendance
First Round – Thursday, May 9
1	12:30 p.m.	#5 Northwestern vs. #12 Indiana	–
2	3:00 p.m.	#8 Ohio State vs. #9 Iowa	–
3	5:30 p.m.	#6 Illinois vs. #11 Penn State	–
4	8:00 p.m.	#7 Michigan State vs. #10 Purdue	–
Quarterfinals – Friday, May 10
5	12:30 a.m.	#4 Wisconsin vs. #5 Northwestern	–
6	3:00 p.m.	#1 Michigan vs. #8 Ohio State	–
7	5:30 p.m.	#3 Minnesota vs. #11 Penn State	–
8	8:00 p.m.	#2 Nebraska vs. #10 Purdue	–
Semifinals – Saturday, May 11
9	3:00 p.m.	#1 Michigan vs. #4 Wisconsin	–
10	5:30 p.m.	#2 Nebraska vs. #3 Minnesota	–
Championship – Saturday, May 12
11	1:00 p.m.	#3 Minnesota vs. #4 Wisconsin	–
*Game times in EDT. # – Rankings denote tournament seed.

== All-Tournament Team ==
- Sara Driesenga (Michigan)
- Ashley Lane (Michigan)
- Alex Davis (Minnesota)
- Sara Moulton (Minnesota)
- Tatum Edwards (Nebraska)
- Emily Lockman (Nebraska)
- Amy Letourneau (Northwestern)
- Cassidy Bell (Penn State)
- Andie Varsho (Purdue)
- Cassandra Darrah (Wisconsin)
- Stefanni LaJeunesse (Wisconsin)
- Maria Van Abel (Wisconsin)

=== Tournament MVP ===
- Cassandra Darrah (Wisconsin)
