= Big Ten Conference Softball Coach of the Year =

Big Ten Conference Coach of the Year
- Awarded for: the most outstanding softball coach in the Big Ten Conference
- Country: United States

History
- First award: 1985
- Most recent: Rhonda Revelle, Nebraska

The Big Ten Conference Coach of the Year is a college softball award given to the Big Ten Conference's most outstanding coach. The award has been given annually since 1985.

== Key ==
| † | Co-Coaches of the Year |

== Winners ==
| Season | Player | School | Reference |
|---|---|---|---|
| 1985 | Carol Hutchins | Michigan | |
| 1986 | Gloria Becksford | Michigan State | |
| 1987 | Sharon Drysdale | Northwestern | |
| 1988 | Linda Wells | Minnesota | |
| 1989 | Gayle Blevins | Iowa | |
| 1990 | Gail Davenport | Ohio State | |
| 1991 | Teresa Wilson | Minnesota | |
| 1992 | Carol Hutchins (2) | Michigan | |
| 1993 | Carol Hutchins (3) | Michigan | |
| 1994 | Diane Stephenson | Indiana | |
| 1995 | Sharon Drysdale (2) | Northwestern | |
| 1996 | Carol Hutchins (4) | Michigan | |
| 1997 | Gayle Blevins (2) | Iowa | |
| 1998 | Carol Hutchins (5) | Michigan | |
| 1999 | Carol Hutchins† (6) | Michigan | |
| 1999 | Robin Petrini† | Penn State | |
| 2000 | Gayle Blevins (3) | Iowa | |
| 2001 | Carol Hutchins (7) | Michigan | |
| 2002 | Linda Kalafatis | Ohio State | |
| 2003 | Jacquie Joseph | Michigan State | |
| 2004 | Carol Hutchins (8) | Michigan | |
| 2005 | Carol Hutchins† (9) | Michigan | |
| 2005 | Kate Drohan† | Northwestern | |
| 2006 | Kate Drohan (2) | Northwestern | |
| 2007 | Linda Kalafatis (2) | Ohio State | |
| 2008 | Carol Hutchins (10) | Michigan | |
| 2009 | Carol Hutchins (11) | Michigan | |
| 2010 | Terri Sullivan | Illinois | |
| 2011 | Carol Hutchins (12) | Michigan | |
| 2012 | Carol Hutchins (13) | Michigan | |
| 2013 | Carol Hutchins (14) | Michigan | |
| 2014 | Rhonda Revelle | Nebraska | |
| 2015 | Carol Hutchins (15) | Michigan | |
| 2016 | Carol Hutchins (16) | Michigan | |
| 2017 | Jessica Allister | Minnesota | |
| 2018 | Carol Hutchins (17) | Michigan | |
| 2019 | Kate Drohan (3) | Northwestern | |
| 2021 | Carol Hutchins (18) | Michigan | |
| 2022 | Kate Drohan (4) | Northwestern | |
| 2023 | Kate Drohan (5) | Northwestern | |
| 2024 | Kate Drohan (6) | Northwestern | |
| 2025 | Melyssa Lombardi | Oregon | |
| 2026 | Rhonda Revelle (2) | Nebraska | |

== Winners by school ==
| School | Winners | Years |
|---|---|---|
| Michigan | 18 | 1985, 1992, 1993, 1996, 1998, 1999, 2001, 2004, 2005, 2008, 2009, 2011, 2012, 2013, 2015, 2016, 2018, 2021 |
| Northwestern | 8 | 1987, 1995, 2005, 2006, 2019, 2022, 2023, 2024 |
| Iowa | 3 | 1989, 1997, 2000 |
| Minnesota | 3 | 1988, 1991, 2017 |
| Ohio State | 3 | 1990, 2002, 2007 |
| Michigan State | 2 | 1986, 2003 |
| Nebraska | 2 | 2014, 2026 |
| Indiana | 1 | 1994 |
| Illinois | 1 | 2010 |
| Oregon | 1 | 2025 |
| Penn State | 1 | 1999 |
| Maryland | 0 | — |
| Purdue | 0 | — |
| Rutgers | 0 | — |
| UCLA | 0 | — |
| Washington | 0 | — |
| Wisconsin | 0 | — |
