= 2018 Big Ten softball tournament =

College softball tournament in Wisconsin

- Teams: 12
- Format: Single-elimination
- Finals site: Goodman Softball Complex; Madison, Wisconsin
- Champions: Minnesota (5th title)
- Runner-up: Northwestern (6th title game)
- Winning coach: Jamie Trachsel (1st title)
- MVP: Maddie Houlihan (Minnesota)
- Television: Big Ten Network

The 2018 Big Ten softball tournament was held at Goodman Softball Complex on the campus of University of Wisconsin in Madison, Wisconsin from May 10 through May 12, 2018. As the tournament winner, Minnesota earned the Big Ten Conference's automatic bid to the 2018 NCAA Division I softball tournament. All games of the tournament aired on BTN.

== Tournament ==
2018 Big Ten Conference softball standings
	Conf.				Overall
Team	W		L	PCT	W		L	PCT
No. 17 Michigan ‍†‍‍^{y}	18	–	3	.857	43	–	11	.796
No. 25 Minnesota ‍‍‡‍^{y}	17	–	4	.810	36	–	15	.706
Indiana ‍‍‍	17	–	6	.739	25	–	29	.463
Ohio State ‍‍‍^{y}	14	–	8	.636	34	–	13	.723
Northwestern ‍‍‍^{y}	14	–	8	.636	36	–	16	.692
Illinois ‍‍‍	13	–	8	.619	36	–	17	.679
Wisconsin ‍‍‍^{y}	11	–	9	.550	27	–	20	.574
Michigan State ‍‍‍	10	–	12	.455	24	–	25	.490
Nebraska ‍‍‍	9	–	13	.409	31	–	22	.585
Purdue ‍‍‍	7	–	15	.318	16	–	39	.291
Maryland ‍‍‍	7	–	16	.304	18	–	36	.333
Iowa ‍‍‍	6	–	16	.273	20	–	31	.392
Penn State ‍‍‍	5	–	18	.217	9	–	41	.180
Rutgers ‍‍‍	4	–	16	.200	19	–	31	.380
† – Conference champion ‡ – Tournament champion y – Invited to the NCAA tournament As of May 7, 2018; Rankings from NFCA

1st Round; May 10th BTN
8	Michigan State	4
9	Nebraska	3
5	Ohio State	1
12	Iowa	5
7	Wisconsin	8^{(5)}
10	Purdue	0
6	Illinois	5
11	Maryland	3

Quarterfinals; May 11th/12th BTN
1	Michigan	0
8	Michigan State	7
4	Northwestern	2^{(8)}
12	Iowa	1
2	Minnesota	6
7	Wisconsin	0
3	Indiana	2
6	Illinois	1

Semifinals; May 12th BTN
8	Michigan State	0
4	Northwestern	11^{(5)}
2	Minnesota	9
3	Indiana	4

Finals; May 13th BTN
4	Northwestern	6
2	Minnesota	9

- Only the top 12 participate in the tournament, therefore Rutgers and Penn State were not eligible to play.

== Schedule ==
Game	Time*	Matchup^{#}	Television	TV Announcers	Attendance
First Round – Thursday, May 10
1	12:00 p.m.	#7 Wisconsin vs. #10 Purdue	Big Ten Network	Lisa Byington & Carol Bruggeman	
2	2:30 p.m.	#6 Illinois vs. #11 Maryland	Big Ten Network	Lisa Byington & Carol Bruggeman	
3	5:30 p.m.	#8 Michigan State vs. #9 Nebraska	Big Ten Network	Dean Linke & Jennie Ritter	
4	8:00 p.m.	#5 Ohio State vs. #12 Iowa	Big Ten Network	Dean Linke & Jennie Ritter	
Quarterfinals – Friday, May 11
5	12:00 p.m.	#2 Minnesota vs. #7 Wisconsin	Big Ten Network	Lisa Byington & Carol Bruggeman	–
6	8:45 p.m.	#3 Indiana vs. #6 Illinois	Big Ten Network	Lisa Byington & Carol Bruggeman	–
7	11 p.m.	#1 Michigan vs. #8 Michigan State	Big Ten Network	Dean Linke & Jennie Ritter	–
Quarterfinals – Saturday, May 12
8	11:30 a.m.	#4 Northwestern vs. #12 Iowa	Big Ten Network	Lisa Byington & Carol Bruggeman	–
Semifinals – Saturday, May 12
9	2:00 p.m.	#2 Minnesota vs. #3 Indiana	Big Ten Network	Lisa Byington & Carol Bruggeman	–
10	4:30 p.m.	#4 Northwestern vs. #8 Michigan State	Big Ten Network	Lisa Byington & Carol Bruggeman	–
Championship – Sunday, May 13
11	11:00 a.m.	#2 Minnesota vs. #4 Northwestern	Big Ten Network	Lisa Byington & Carol Bruggeman	–
*Game times in EDT. # – Rankings denote tournament seed.
