= List of Northwestern Wildcats head softball coaches =

The Northwestern Wildcats softball program is a college softball team that represents Northwestern University in the Big Ten Conference in the National Collegiate Athletic Association. The team has had 3 head coaches since it started playing organized softball in the 1976 season. The current coach is Kate Drohan, who took over the head coaching position in 2002. She holds all major coaching records at Northwestern.

== Key ==
General
#	Number of coaches (Note: A running total of the number of head coaches.)
GC	Games coached

Overall
OW	Wins
OL	Losses
OT	Ties
O%	Winning percentage

Conference (Note: Northwestern has played as a member of the Big Ten Conference since 1978.)
CW	Wins
CL	Losses
CT	Ties
C%	Winning percentage

Postseason (Note: Postseason play involving the NCAA Division I Softball Championship or AIAW Women's College World Series.)
PA	Total Appearances (Note: Postseason appearances include seasons with NCAA Division I Softball Championship bids since the tournament began in 1982.)
PW	Total Wins
PL	Total Losses
WA	Women's College World Series appearances (Note: College World Series appearances include seasons with WCWS bids since the tournament began in 1969.)
WW	Women's College World Series wins
WL	Women's College World Series losses

Championships
CC	Conference regular season
CT	Conference tournament (Note: The Big Ten softball tournament has been played in 1982, 1995–2008, 2013–2019, and 2022–present.)
NC	National championships (Note: Women's College World Series sponsored by either the AIAW or NCAA.)

== Coaches ==
List of head softball coaches showing season(s) coached, overall records, conference records, postseason records, championships and selected awards (Note: Statistics correct as of the end of the 2025 NCAA Division I softball season.)
#	Name	Term	GC	OW	OL	OT	O%	CW	CL	CT	C%	PA	WA	CCs	CTs	NCs
1	Mary Conway	1976–1978	37	10	27	—	.270	1	8	—	.111	—	—	—	—	—
2	Sharon Drysdale	1979–2001	1,155	640	512	3	.555	274	208	—	.568	5	3	5	1	—
3	Kate Drohan	2002–present	1,249	810	437	2	.649	343	163	—	.678	18	3	5	2	—
