= Frezzotti =

Frezzotti is a surname. Notable people with the surname include:

- Alejandro Frezzotti (born 1984), Argentine footballer
- Magali Frezzotti, American softball coach
