= Bob Breitenstein (offensive lineman) =

Argentine gridiron football player (1943–2023)

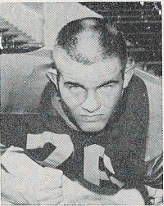
- Breitenstein in the 1964 Tulsa Golden Hurricane football media guide

No. 76, 75, 65
- Positions: Tackle, Guard

Personal information
- Born: May 8, 1943; Buenos Aires, Argentina
- Died: March 13, 2023 (aged 79); Oklahoma, U.S.
- Listed height: 6 ft 3 in (1.91 m)
- Listed weight: 265 lb (120 kg)

Career information
- High school: Farmington (Farmington, New Mexico, U.S.)
- College: Tulsa (1961-1964)
- NFL draft: 1965: 2nd round, 21st overall pick
- AFL draft: 1965: 5th round, 33rd overall pick

Career history
- Denver Broncos (1965–1967); Minnesota Vikings (1967); Chicago Bears (1968); Atlanta Falcons (1969–1970)

Awards and highlights
- 2× All-MVC (1963, 1964)

Career NFL/AFL statistics
- Games played: 58
- Games started: 40
- Stats at Pro Football Reference

Robert Corr Breitenstein (May 8, 1943 – March 13, 2023) was a professional American football player in the American Football League (AFL) and National Football League (NFL) for the Denver Broncos, Minnesota Vikings, and Atlanta Falcons. He played college football at the University of Tulsa. He is distinguished as being the first Argentine to play in the NFL.

== Early life ==
Breitenstein attended Farmington High School, where he was a teammate of future NFL player Ralph Neely.

Breitenstein accepted a football scholarship from the University of Tulsa. He played as an offensive tackle.

As a senior in 1964, he contributed to the team leading the nation in average yards (461.8 yards) and in scoring average per game (38.4 points). He also was a part of the team that defeated Ole Miss, 14–7 in the 1964 Bluebonnet Bowl.

In 1994, he was inducted into the University of Tulsa Athletic Hall of Fame.

== Professional career ==
=== Denver Broncos ===
Breitenstein was selected in the fifth round (33rd overall) of the 1965 AFL draft by the Denver Broncos. He was also selected by the Washington Redskins in the second round (21st overall) of the 1965 NFL draft. He signed with the Broncos, although he later tried to invalidate the contract.

As a rookie, he started in 7 games, while sharing the left tackle position with Lee Bernet. In 1966, he started all 14 games.

On July 1, 1967, he was traded to the Minnesota Vikings in exchange for a fifth round draft choice (#117-Mike Bragg).

=== Minnesota Vikings ===
On October 5, 1967, he was activated from the taxi squad and played in 11 games. On August 5, 1968, he walked out of training camp in a contract dispute and was placed on the reserve list. On October 19, 1968, he was traded to the Chicago Bears in exchange for a draft pick.

=== Chicago Bears ===
In 1968, he was declared inactive in 9 games. He was waived on September 16, 1969.

=== Atlanta Falcons ===
In 1969, he signed with the Atlanta Falcons and played in 10 games. In 1970, after playing in 7 games, he was lost for the year with a knee injury. An automobile accident 9 days before the 1971 training camp complicated the injury and he was not able to recover. He was released on August 23.

== Personal life ==
After football, he owned and operated an insurance agency. He was a vice president of the National Football League Players Association for the state of Oklahoma. He appeared in the movie Brian's Song, when the director used actual footage, showing him helping cart running back Gale Sayers off on a stretcher.

Breitenstein died on March 13, 2023, at the age of 79.
