= Yvette Healy =

American softball coach

Current position
- Title: Head coach
- Team: Wisconsin
- Conference: Big Ten
- Record: 476–330–1 (.590)

Biographical details
- Born: Orland Park, Illinois, U.S.
- Education: DePaul

Playing career
- 1996–1999: DePaul

Coaching career (HC unless noted)
- 2002–2004: DePaul (asst.)
- 2005–2010: Loyola-Chicago
- 2011–present: Wisconsin

Head coaching record
- Overall: 607–502–2 (.547)
- Tournaments: NCAA: 13–14 (.481)

Accomplishments and honors

Championships
- Horizon Regular Season Champions (2007); Big Ten Tournament Champions (2013)

Awards
- Horizon Coach of the Year (2007)

Yvette Healy is an American former collegiate All-American softball second baseman and current head coach at Wisconsin, originally from Orland Park, Illinois. She played college softball at DePaul from 1996 to 1999 and was a four-time Summit League honoree.

== Playing career ==
Healy played college softball for the DePaul Blue Demons in the Summit League from 1996 to 1999.

== Coaching career ==
=== Wisconsin ===
In the summer of 2010, Yvette Healy was announced as the head coach of the Wisconsin softball program.

== Personal life ==
Healy is married to her husband Shawn. They have two daughters named Grace and Maeve.

Healy attended Providence Catholic High School.

== Statistics ==
DePaul Blue Demons
YEAR	G	AB	R	H	BA	RBI	HR	3B	2B	TB	SLG	BB	SO	SB	SBA
1996	61	187	47	69	.369	10	1	2	1	77	.412%	9	12	27	31
1997	57	160	52	59	.369	14	0	0	1	60	.375%	16	14	33	42
1998	48	139	43	59	.424	14	0	2	2	65	.467%	17	8	23	25
1999	68	184	36	63	.342	12	0	3	5	74	.402%	13	12	19	26
TOTALS	234	670	178	250	.373	50	1	7	9	276	.412%	55	46	102	124

== Head coaching record ==
=== College ===
Record table
Season	Team	Overall	Conference	Standing	Postseason
Loyola-Chicago Ramblers (Horizon League) (2005–2010)
2005	Loyola-Chicago	18–37	8–9	4th	
2006	Loyola-Chicago	20–41	10–10	5th	
2007	Loyola-Chicago	21–21	14–5	1st	
2008	Loyola-Chicago	22–25–1	12–7	4th	
2009	Loyola-Chicago	28–24	14–10	4th	
2010	Loyola-Chicago	22–24	10–12	7th	
Loyola-Chicago:		131–172–1 (.433)	68–53 (.562)		
Wisconsin Badgers (Big Ten Conference) (2011–Present)
2011	Wisconsin	30–23	9–11	T-6th	
2012	Wisconsin	34–19	13–10	T-6th	
2013	Wisconsin	44–13	16–7	4th	NCAA Regional
2014	Wisconsin	36–20	15–7	4th	NCAA Regional
2015	Wisconsin	21–31	5–17	13th	
2016	Wisconsin	28–24–1	11–11–1	8th	
2017	Wisconsin	35–17	11–11	6th	NCAA Regional
2018	Wisconsin	29–23	11–9	7th	NCAA Regional
2019	Wisconsin	43–14	15–8	5th	NCAA Regional
2020	Wisconsin	14–10	0-0	-	Season cancelled due to COVID-19
2021	Wisconsin	18–22	18–22	9th	
2022	Wisconsin	30–21	12–11	8th	NCAA Regional
2023	Wisconsin	27–20	12–10	5th	
2024	Wisconsin	21–31	8–15	11th	
2025	Wisconsin	33–21	11–11	8th	
2026	Wisconsin	33-21	14-10		NCAA Regional
Wisconsin:		476–330–1 (.590)	181–170–1 (.516)		
Total:		607–502–2 (.547)			
National champion Postseason invitational champion Conference regular season champion Conference regular season and conference tournament champion Division regular season champion Division regular season and conference tournament champion Conference tournament champion
