= Jenna Hall =

American softball coach (born 1984)

Current position
- Title: Head coach
- Team: Illinois
- Conference: Big Ten
- Record: 0–0 (–)

Biographical details
- Born: May 31, 1984 (age 42)
- Education: University of Illinois Urbana-Champaign

Playing career
- 2003–2006: Illinois
- 2006–2008: Philadelphia Force

Coaching career (HC unless noted)
- 2007: Illinois (Vol. asst.)
- 2008–2012: Ohio (asst.)
- 2013–2019: Ohio State (asst.)
- 2020–2022: Pitt (asst.)
- 2023–2026: Ohio
- 2027–present: Illinois

Head coaching record
- Overall: 138–86 (.616)

Accomplishments and honors

Awards
- 2× Mid-American Conference Coach of the Year (2023, 2025)

Jenna Hall (born May 31, 1984) is an American softball coach. She is the current head coach at Illinois. She previously served as the head coach at Ohio.

== Early life ==
Hall was born to Keith and Terri Hall. She attended Minooka High School where she played softball. She pitched and played third base in her first three years and moved to first base as a senior. She was named to the All-Suburban Prairie Conference four times, and named Suburban Prairie Conference MVP as a junior She finished her high school career with a .427 batting average, with 38 doubles, two triples, 10 home runs and 83 RBI.

== Playing career ==
Hall played college softball at Illinois. During the 2003 season, in her freshman year, she started all 57 games and made just one error in 397 chances at first base. She finished the season with a .408 batting average, 12 doubles, five home runs and 26 RBI and batted .408 in Big Ten conference play. During the 2004 season, in her sophomore year, she started every game and led the team in RBI (31), doubles (11), and home runs (5).

During the 2005 season, in her junior year, she set Illinois' single-season records for RBI (43) and walks (36) despite the Illini playing just 43 games. During the 2006 season, in her senior year, she set single-season program records in batting average (.481), slugging percentage (.847), on-base percentage (.651), and walks (60). Following the season she was named an NFCA First Team All-American, the first in program history. She was also named a top-25 finalist for the USA Softball Collegiate Player of the Year.

She finished her collegiate career as Illinois' record holder for career (.357) and single-season (.481) batting average, slugging percentage (.580), on-base percentage (.486), home runs (33), RBI (142), total bases (361) and walks (148). She was named First-Team All-Big Ten all four years. Following her collegiate career, she played professionally for the Philadelphia Force of the National Pro Fastpitch (NPF) for three seasons. She was named to the All-NPF in 2006, her first season with the Force.

== Coaching career ==
Hall began her coaching career as an assistant for Ohio, a position she held from 2008 to 2012. During the 2012 season, she helped lead the Bobcats offense to single-season program records in home runs (47), RBI (255) and runs (293). On August 16, 2012, she was named an assistant coach for Ohio State. She spent seven seasons at Ohio State from 2013 to 2019, and helped lead the Buckeyes to four consecutive NCAA Tournament appearances from 2016 to 2019, a program first. On September 9, 2019, she was named an assistant coach for Pitt.

On August 2, 2022, she was named head coach for Ohio. In four seasons at Ohio, she led the Bobcats to a 138–86 record. During the 2025 season, she led Ohio to a 37–19 record, their third consecutive 30-plus win season. Following the season she was named the Mid-American Conference (MAC) Coach of the Year.

On June 2, 2026, she was named head coach for her Illinois, becoming the third head coach in program history.

== Personal life ==
Hall is married to her wife, Cristina, and they have three children, Elijah, Jonah and Olivia.

== Head coaching record ==
Record table
Season	Team	Overall	Conference	Standing	Postseason
Ohio Bobcats (MAC) (2023–2026)
2023	Ohio	32–23	20–9	2nd	
2024	Ohio	31–24	18–8	2nd	
2025	Ohio	37–19	18–8	2nd	
2026	Ohio	38–20	17–10	4th	
Ohio:		138–86 (.616)	73–35 (.676)		
Total:		138–86 (.616)			
National champion Postseason invitational champion Conference regular season champion Conference regular season and conference tournament champion Division regular season champion Division regular season and conference tournament champion Conference tournament champion
