= Magali Frezzotti =

American softball coach

Current position
- Title: Head coach
- Team: Purdue
- Conference: Big Ten
- Record: 55–50 (.524)

Biographical details
- Education: Concordia University

Coaching career (HC unless noted)
- 2016–2017: Concordia (GA)
- 2018: Eastern Michigan (Volunteer asst.)
- 2019–2021: Montana (asst.)
- 2022–2023: Purdue (asst.)
- 2024–present: Purdue

Head coaching record
- Overall: 55–50 (.524)

Magali Frezzotti is an American softball coach who is the current head coach at Purdue.

== Coaching career ==
=== Eastern Michigan ===
On June 16, 2017, The Eagles hired Frezzotti as an assistant coach under Melissa Gentile.

=== Purdue ===
On August 18, 2021, Purdue hired Frezzotti as an assistant coach under Boo De Oliveira. On June 24, 2022, Frezzotti was promoted to head coach of the Purdue Boilermakers softball program.

== Head coaching record ==
=== College ===
Record table
Season	Team	Overall	Conference	Standing	Postseason
Purdue Boilmakers (Big Ten Conference) (2024–Present)
2024	Purdue	25–27	11–12	9th	
2025	Purdue	30–23	9–13	12th	
Purdue:		55–50 (.524)	20–25 (.444)		
Total:		55–50 (.524)			
National champion Postseason invitational champion Conference regular season champion Conference regular season and conference tournament champion Division regular season champion Division regular season and conference tournament champion Conference tournament champion
