= Gretta Melsted =

American softball coach

Current position
- Title: Head coach
- Team: Minnesota
- Conference: Big Ten
- Record: 0–0 (–)

Biographical details
- Education: Carleton College

Coaching career (HC unless noted)
- 2004–2006: Culver–Stockton
- 2007–2026: Augustana
- 2027–present: Minnesota

Head coaching record
- Overall: 813–313 (.722)

Accomplishments and honors

Championships
- NCAA Division II softball tournament (2019); 8× NSIC regular season champion (2010, 2011, 2015, 2021–2025); 6× NSIC tournament champion (2011, 2019, 2022, 2024–2026)

Awards
- 6× NSIC Coach of the Year (2009–2011, 2021, 2022, 2025); National Fastpitch Coaches Association Hall of Fame (2024)

Gretta Melsted is an American softball coach. She is the current head coach at Minnesota. She previously served as the head coach at Augustana.

== Early life ==
Melsted attended Carleton College where she played basketball and softball. During the 1997 season she set the single-season program record for runs scored with 37. She earned her bachelor's degree in history from Carleton College and her master's degree in education administration from William Woods University.

== Coaching career ==
=== Augustana ===
Melsted served as the head coach at Augustana from 2007 to 2026, where she posted an 813–313 record. She led the team to eight Northern Sun Intercollegiate Conference (NSIC) regular season conference titles, six NSIC tournament titles and 14 NCAA Division II softball tournament appearances.

During the 2009 season, she led the Vikings to a 29–21 overall record, and a 20–5 conference record, and was named the NSIC coach of the year. During the 2010 season, she led her team to the NSIC regular season championship for the first time in program history with a 23–3 record and was named the NSIC coach of the year for the second consecutive year. During the 2011 season, she led her team to the NSIC regular season championship for the second consecutive season, and their first NSIC tournament championship in program history. She was subsequently named the NSIC coach of the year for the third consecutive year.

During the 2019 season, she led her team to a program-record tying 61 wins and the NCAA Division II national championship. During the 2022 season, she led the Vikings to a 43–8 record, their second consecutive NSIC title and was subsequently named the NSIC coach of the year for the second consecutive year.

She was inducted into the National Fastpitch Coaches Association Hall of Fame in December 2024. During the 2025 season, she led the Vikings to their fifth consecutive NSIC regular season title and was subsequently named the NSIC coach of the year for the sixth time in her career.

=== Minnesota ===
On May 21, 2026, Melsted was named the head coach at Minnesota.

== Head coaching record ==
Record table
Season	Team	Overall	Conference	Standing	Postseason
Augustana Vikings (NSIC) (2007–2026)
2007	Augustana	22–29		5th	
2008	Augustana	17–28		5th	
2009	Augustana	31–23	20–5	2nd	
2010	Augustana	46–14	23–3	1st	NCAA Regional
2011	Augustana	50–11	22–3	1st	NCAA Regional
2012	Augustana	53–12	22–4	2nd	Women's College World Series
2013	Augustana	32–17	17–9	6th	NCAA Regional
2014	Augustana	46–15	23–7	3rd	NCAA Regional
2015	Augustana	53–11	28–2	1st	NCAA Regional
2016	Augustana	35–19	21–8	4th	
2017	Augustana	40–16	21–5	3rd	NCAA Regional
2018	Augustana	42–15	19–5	2nd	NCAA Regional
2019	Augustana	61–11	27–3	2nd	NCAA Div. II Champion
2020	Augustana	16–3			
2021	Augustana	49–8	28–2	1st	Women's College World Series
2022	Augustana	50–10	27–3	1st	NCAA Regional
2023	Augustana	39–15	23–5	1st	
2024	Augustana	50–15	27–1	1st	Women's College World Series
2025	Augustana	50–11	25–3	1st	NCAA Regional
2026	Augustana	31–28	19–11	5th	NCAA Regional
Augustana:		813–313 (.722)	392–79 (.832)		
Total:		813–313 (.722)			
National champion Postseason invitational champion Conference regular season champion Conference regular season and conference tournament champion Division regular season champion Division regular season and conference tournament champion Conference tournament champion
