= Jamie Trachsel =

American softball coach

Current position
- Title: Head coach
- Team: Ole Miss
- Conference: SEC
- Record: 181–117 (.607)

Biographical details
- Born: February 12, 1979 (age 47); Duluth, Minnesota, U.S.
- Education: St. Cloud State (BS); North Dakota State (MEd)

Playing career
- 1997–2001: St. Cloud State

Coaching career (HC unless noted)
- 2002–2004: North Dakota State (GA)
- 2005–2007: North Dakota State (asst.)
- 2008–2010: North Dakota State (AHC)
- 2011–2016: North Dakota State (Co-HC)
- 2017: Iowa State
- 2018–2020: Minnesota
- 2021–present: Ole Miss

Head coaching record
- Overall: 523–291–1 (.642)
- Tournaments: NCAA: 18–18 (.500)

Accomplishments and honors

Championships
- WCWS appearance (2019); Regional champions (2019); Big Ten Tournament champions (2018); Summit League Tournament champions (2009, 2010, 2011, 2012, 2014, 2015, 2016); Summit League regular season champions (2008, 2012, 2013, 2014, 2015, 2016)

Awards
- NFCA Great Lakes Regional Coaching Staff of the Year (2019)

Jamie Trachsel (born February 12, 1979) is an American softball coach who is the head coach of the Ole Miss Rebels softball team.

== Coaching career ==
=== Iowa State ===
On, June 9, 2016, Jamie Trachsel was announced as the head coach of the Iowa State softball program. In her only season with the Cyclones, she led them to a 5th place Big 12 finish, their best finish in the Big 12 since 1994. They completed the program's first series win over Texas. In her only season the team finished 23–35 overall and 6–12 in the Big 12.

=== Minnesota ===
On June 24, 2017, Jamie Trachsel was announced as the new head coach of the Minnesota softball program, replacing Jessica Allister who left to be the head coach of her alma mater, Stanford. In her first season at Minnesota, she led the Gophers to a 41–17 record and 17–4, 2nd place Big Ten finish, a Big Ten Tournament title, and an NCAA Tournament bid, where they eventually were eliminated in the Regionals by Washington. In her second season as head coach of the Golden Gophers in 2019, Minnesota went 46–14 and 20–2 in the Big Ten. Minnesota advanced to the NCAA Women's College World Series for the first time in program history. In her final season as Minnesota head coach, the Golden Gophers went 15–9–1 in a season shortened by the coronavirus pandemic of 2020.

=== Ole Miss ===
On April 24, 2020, Trachsel was announced as the new head coach at Ole Miss to replace Ruben Felix.

== Head coaching record ==
Record table
Season	Team	Overall	Conference	Standing	Postseason
North Dakota State Bison (Summit League) (2011–2016)
2011	North Dakota State	30–27	17–7	2nd	NCAA Regional
2012	North Dakota State	38–22	18–6	1st	NCAA Regional
2013	North Dakota State	33–16	17–1	1st	
2014	North Dakota State	36–18	13–3	1st	NCAA Regional
2015	North Dakota State	45–11	16–2	1st	NCAA Regional
2016	North Dakota State	39–15	17–0	1st	NCAA Regional
North Dakota State:		221–109 (.670)	98–19 (.838)		
Iowa State Cyclones (Big 12 Conference) (2017)
2017	Iowa State	23–35	6–12	5th	
Iowa State:		23–35 (.397)	6–12 (.333)		
Minnesota Golden Gophers (Big Ten Conference) (2018–2020)
2018	Minnesota	41–17	17–4	2nd	NCAA Regional
2019	Minnesota	46–14	20–2	3rd	Women's College World Series
2020	Minnesota	15–9–1 (Note: The season was not played past March 12 due to the COVID-19 pandemic in the United States.)	0–0		Postseason not held
Minnesota:		102–40–1 (.717)	37–6 (.860)		
Ole Miss Rebels (Southeastern Conference) (2021–present)
2021	Ole Miss	36–22	12–12	8th	NCAA Regional
2022	Ole Miss	41–19	12–12	T-8th	NCAA Regional
2023	Ole Miss	32–28	8–16	11th	NCAA Regional
2024	Ole Miss	31–27	7–17	13th	NCAA Regional
2025	Ole Miss	42–21	11–13	11th	Women's College World Series
2026	Ole Miss	36–26	6–18	13th	NCAA Regional
Ole Miss:		218–143 (.604)	56–87 (.392)		
Total:		560–317–1 (.638)			
National champion Postseason invitational champion Conference regular season champion Conference regular season and conference tournament champion Division regular season champion Division regular season and conference tournament champion Conference tournament champion
