= Farmington High School (New Mexico) =

Coordinates: 36°45′00″N 108°12′16″W

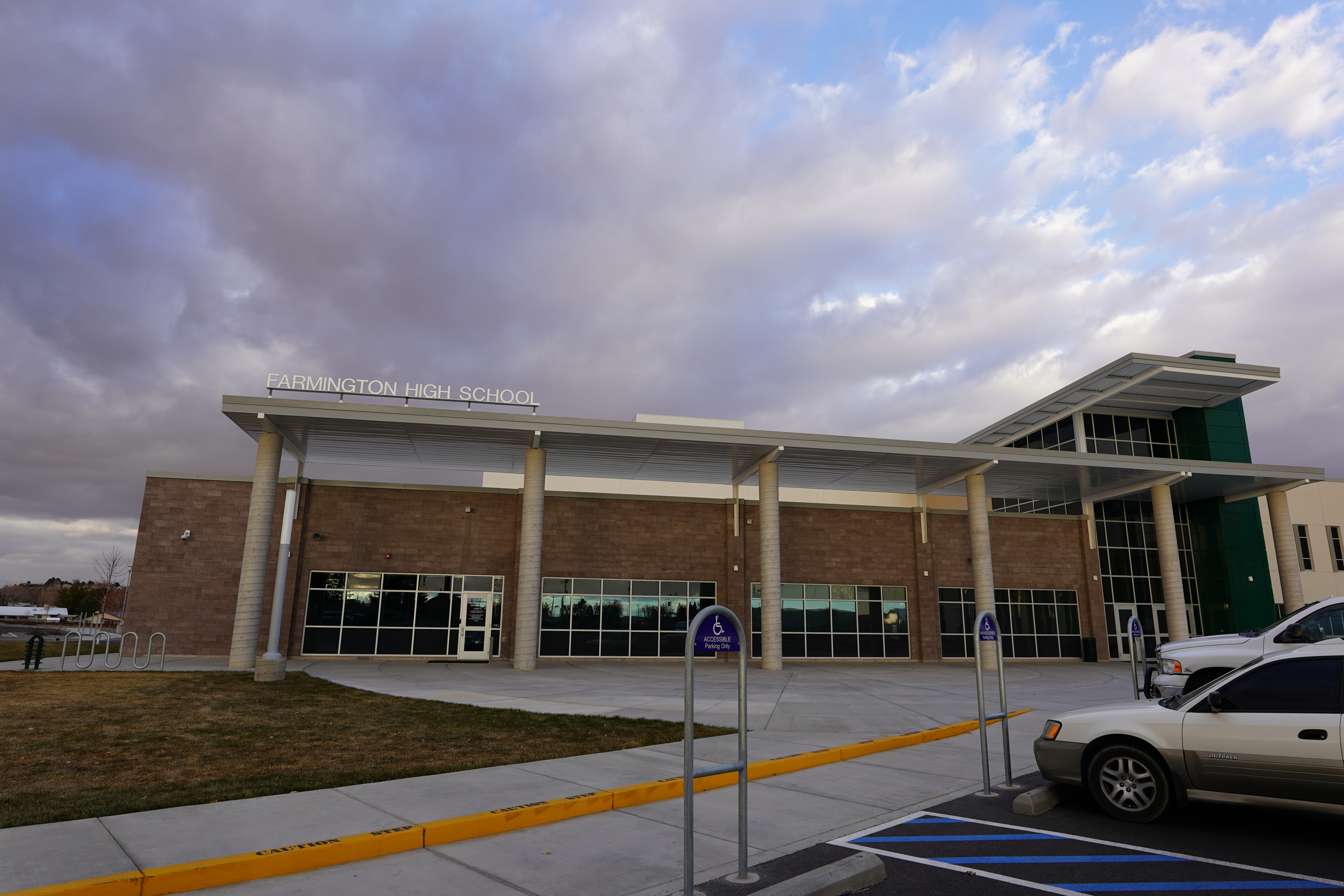

Location
- 2200 Sunset Avenue; Farmington, New Mexico 87401; United States

Information
- School type: Public, High School
- Motto: Feel the Sting!
- Locale: City: Small (13)
- NCES School ID: 350099000284
- Principal: Rocky Torres
- Grades: 9-12
- Enrollment: 1,821 (2023–2024)
- Colors: Kelly Green, Black, & White
- Athletics: 13 sports
- Athletics conference: NMAA; AAAAA District 2
- Team name: Scorpions
- Website: fhs.farmingtonschools.us

Farmington High School (FHS) is a public high school in Farmington, New Mexico, United States. It is part of the Farmington Municipal School District.

FHS is one of four high schools in Farmington. It serves students in grades 9 through 12 who reside on the west side of the city along NM 170 and NM 371. The other high schools in Farmington are Piedra Vista High School, San Juan College High School, and Rocinante High school, all of which are located on the east side of the city.

== Athletics ==
State Championships

Sport	Year
Baseball	1969, 1970, 1984, 1986, 1991, 1994, 1995, 2001, 2002, 2005, 2006, 2007, 2008, 2018
Basketball (Boys)	1982, 1986
Basketball (Girls)	1979, 2002
Cheerleading	1984, 2001
Cross Country (Girls)	1991
Dance/Drill Team	1993, 1994, 2001, 2002, 2003, 2004, 2010
Football	1952, 2013
Golf (Boys)	1985, 1995, 1999
Gymnastics (Boys)	1969
Soccer (Boys)	2010, 2012
Softball	1994, 1995, 1997, 1998, 2000, 2002, 2003, 2004
Swimming (Boys)	1998
Swimming (Girls)	1971
Tennis (Girls)	2009, 2010, 2011, 2012, 2014, 2015
Track & Field (Boys)	2014
Track & Field (Girls)	2004
Wrestling	1985, 1992, 1993, 2001, 2003, 2021, 2022

== Notable alumni ==
- Bob Breitenstein – former offensive lineman. First Argentine player in the NFL
- Bill Hall, member of the New Mexico House of Representatives
- Ralph Neely – Dallas Cowboys, NFL 1960s All-Decade Team.
- Alana Nichols - alpine skier and wheelchair basketball player
- Piper Ritter, softball pitcher and coach
- William Sharer, member of the New Mexico Senate
- Joey Villasenor – professional mixed martial artist
- Duane Ward – Toronto Blue Jays, 2 time World Series Champion, MLB all-star, MLB saves champion.
