= Linda Wells (softball) =

American softball coach (born 1949)

Biographical details
- Born: December 13, 1949 (age 76); Pacific, Missouri, U.S.

Coaching career (HC unless noted)

Women's basketball
- 1973–1974: Minnesota
- 1974–1977: Minnesota (asst.)

Women's volleyball
- 1974: Minnesota
- 1977–1981: Minnesota

College softball
- 1974–1975: Minnesota
- 1977–1989: Minnesota
- 1990–2005: Arizona State

Head coaching record
- Overall: 914–679–1 (.574) (college softball); 245–95–5 (.717) (women's volleyball)

Accomplishments and honors

Awards
- Big Ten Coach of the Year (1988)

Linda Marie Wells (born December 13, 1949) is an American former softball coach. She previously served as the head coach for the Minnesota Golden Gophers softball and Arizona State Sun Devils softball teams.

== Playing career ==
Wells was a three-sport athlete in high school, and played softball, volleyball, basketball, tennis and field hockey while at Southeast Missouri State University. She Played professionally from 1975 to 1979, serving as player-coach for the Chicago Ravens and St. Louis Hummers.

== Coaching career ==
=== Minnesota ===
Wells started the Minnesota Golden Gophers softball program in 1974. She served as the head coach for the Gophers from 1974 to 1989, missing the 1976 season due to attending medical school at Saint Louis University. She was named the Big Ten Conference Softball Coach of the Year in 1988 after leading her team to a 31–25 record and the Big Ten Conference Championship. During her career at Minnesota she posted a 350–264–1 record.

She served as the Minnesota Golden Gophers women's basketball coach for the 1973–74 season, and an assistant coach from 1974 to 1977. She also served as the Minnesota Golden Gophers women's volleyball coach in 1974, and from 1977 to 1981. Her 1978 volleyball squad won an unofficial Big Ten title and her 1981 squad placed seventh at the AIAW National Championships.

=== Arizona State ===
Wells served as the head coach at Arizona State from 1990 to 2005, where she posted a 563–415 record and led the team to 12 NCAA Regional appearances and two Women's College World Series appearances. On February 13, 2005, Wells earned her 537th career win at Arizona State, surpassing Mary Littlewood for the most wins in program history. On March 5, 2005, Wells earned her 900th career win. Her 563 wins are the most in Arizona State softball history.

=== International career ===
Internationally she served as head coach of the United States women's national softball team that won a gold medal at the 1985 South Pacific Classic in Melbourne, Australia, and the 1987 Pan American Games gold-medal team. She also served as the head coach of Greece women's national softball team at the 2004 Summer Olympics in Athens, Greece and a coach for the Netherlands women's national softball team at the 2008 Summer Olympics in Beijing, China.

== Legacy ==
Described as a women's sports pioneer, Wells has been inducted into several hall of fame, including the National Fastpitch Coaches Association Hall of Fame, Arizona Softball Hall of Fame, St. Louis Sports Hall of Fame, Southeast Missouri's Hall of Fame, the University of Minnesota Hall of Fame in volleyball and softball, and the State of Minnesota Hall of Fame.

== Head coaching record ==
Record table
Season	Team	Overall	Conference	Standing	Postseason
Minnesota (Big Ten Conference) (1974–1989)
1974	Minnesota	5–8			
1975	Minnesota	12–5			
1977	Minnesota	15–8	1–2	T-4th	
1978	Minnesota	38–14			
1979	Minnesota	25–8	1–2	T-4th	
1980	Minnesota	18–21–1			
1981	Minnesota	29–11	4–1	1st	
1982	Minnesota	14–15	0–2	T-6th	
1983	Minnesota	32–18	13–9	3rd	
1984	Minnesota	30–19	14–8	2nd	
1985	Minnesota	25–24	8–12	T-5th	
1986	Minnesota	28–23	15–9	T-1st	
1987	Minnesota	21–36	8–16	6th	
1988	Minnesota	31–25	15–8	1st	NCAA Regionals
1989	Minnesota	27–29	11–13	5th	
Minnesota:		350–264–1 (.570)	90–82 (.523)		
Arizona State (Pac-10 Conference) (1990–2005)
1990	Arizona State	43–32	10–10	5th	NCAA Regionals
1991	Arizona State	43–18	15–5	2nd	NCAA Regionals
1992	Arizona State	27–21	7–9	6th	
1993	Arizona State	34–26	13–11	3rd	NCAA Regionals
1994	Arizona State	22–41	7–17	6th	
1995	Arizona State	29–26	10–18	6th	
1996	Arizona State	34–27	10–18	5th	
1997	Arizona State	32–25	9–19	6th	NCAA Regionals
1998	Arizona State	38–27	9–19	6th	NCAA Regionals
1999	Arizona State	41–28	8–20	8th	Women’s College World Series
2000	Arizona State	43–20	8–13	5th	NCAA Regionals
2001	Arizona State	36–22	9–12	6th	NCAA Regionals
2002	Arizona State	46–20	10–11	T-3rd	Women’s College World Series
2003	Arizona State	32–25	7–14	7th	NCAA Regionals
2004	Arizona State	33–31	3–17	8th	
2005	Arizona State	30–26	4–17	8th	NCAA Regionals
Arizona State:		563–415 (.576)	139–230 (.377)		
Total:		914–679–1 (.574)			
National champion Postseason invitational champion Conference regular season champion Conference regular season and conference tournament champion Division regular season champion Division regular season and conference tournament champion Conference tournament champion
