= Tyra Perry =

American softball coach

Biographical details
- Born: Zachary, Louisiana, U.S.
- Education: LSU

Playing career
- 1994–1995: Nicholls State
- 1997–1998: LSU

Coaching career (HC unless noted)
- 2001–2007: Birmingham-Southern
- 2008–2013: Western Kentucky
- 2014–2015: Ball State
- 2016–2026: Illinois

Administrative career (AD unless noted)
- 2006–2007: Birmingham-Southern (Assistant AD/Senior Woman Administrator)

Head coaching record
- Overall: 710–652–1 (.521)
- Tournaments: NCAA: 7–12 (.368)

Accomplishments and honors

Championships
- Sun Belt Regular Season Champion (2013); MAC Regular Season Champion (2014); MAC West Champion (2015); MAC tournament (2015)

Awards
- MAC Coach of the Year (2014); 2× Sun Belt Coach of the Year (2009, 2013)

Records
- Birmingham-Southern Softball First Winning Record Season (2006); First 40-plus-win Season in Western Kentucky Program History (2013); First Sun Belt Title in Western Kentucky Program History (2013); Winningest Coach in Western Kentucky Softball History (196); First ever NCAA Regional in Western Kentucky Program History (2013); Finished ranked #26 in NCAA RPI the Highest Final Ranking in Program History (2013); First NCAA Regional Victory in Ball State Program History (2015)

Tyra Perry is an American former collegiate softball outfielder, and former head coach originally from Zachary, Louisiana. She began playing for the Nicholls State Colonels from 1994–95 and ended with the LSU Tigers from 1997-98. She was most recently leading Illinois Fighting Illini softball.

== Coaching career ==
=== Ball State ===
On August 6, 2013, Perry was named the head coach at Ball State.

=== Illinois ===
On June 24, 2015, Perry was named the head coach at Illinois.

On May 4, 2026, Illinois announced that Perry would not return for the 2027 season, parting ways after eleven seasons.

== Career statistics ==
Nicholls State Colonels & LSU Tigers
| YEAR | G | AB | R | H | BA | RBI | HR | 3B | 2B | TB | SLG | BB | SO | SB | SBA |
| 1995 | 63 | 198 | 36 | 67 | .338 | 45 | 3 | 4 | 11 | 95 | .480% | 16 | 29 | 5 | 7 |
| 1997 | 58 | 165 | 40 | 57 | .345 | 39 | 11 | 2 | 7 | 101 | .612% | 20 | 22 | 10 | 11 |
| 1998 | 70 | 182 | 29 | 59 | .324 | 38 | 5 | 1 | 12 | 88 | .483% | 16 | 23 | 4 | 5 |
| TOTALS | 191 | 545 | 105 | 183 | .336 | 122 | 19 | 7 | 30 | 284 | .521% | 52 | 74 | 19 | 23 |

== Head coaching record ==
=== College ===
Record table
| Season | Team | Overall | Conference | Standing | Postseason |
|---|---|---|---|---|---|
Birmingham-Southern Panthers (NCAA Division I Provisional Member) (2002–2003)
| 2002 | Birmingham-Southern | 17–42 | | | |
| 2003 | Birmingham-Southern | 26–32 | | | |
Birmingham-Southern Panthers (Big South Conference) (2004–2007)
| 2004 | Birmingham-Southern | 25–34 | 6–6 | T-3rd | |
| 2005 | Birmingham-Southern | 25–32 | 5–7 | 5th | |
| 2006 | Birmingham-Southern | 28–21 | 7–5 | 4th | |
| 2007 | Birmingham-Southern | 25–37 | 5–10 | 5th | |
| Birmingham-Southern: | | 146–198 (.424) | 23–28 (.451) | | |
Western Kentucky Lady Toppers (Sun Belt Conference) (2008–2013)
| 2008 | Western Kentucky | 28–30 | 8–15 | 8th | |
| 2009 | Western Kentucky | 35–19 | 14–9 | 3rd | |
| 2010 | Western Kentucky | 27–25 | 6–15 | 9th | |
| 2011 | Western Kentucky | 30–29 | 9–15 | 7th | |
| 2012 | Western Kentucky | 33–25–1 | 11–12–1 | 5th | |
| 2013 | Western Kentucky | 43–18 | 20–3 | 1st | NCAA Regional |
| Western Kentucky: | | 196–146–1 (.573) | 68–69–1 (.496) | | |
Ball State Cardinals (Mid-American Conference) (2014–2015)
| 2014 | Ball State | 33–19 | 12–4 | 1st (West) | |
| 2015 | Ball State | 34–25 | 14–5 | 1st | NCAA Regional |
| Ball State: | | 67–44 (.604) | 26–9 (.743) | | |
Illinois Fighting Illini (Big Ten Conference) (2016–2026)
| 2016 | Illinois | 36–23 | 12–11 | 7th | NCAA Regional |
| 2017 | Illinois | 39–20 | 14–8 | 4th | NCAA Regional |
| 2018 | Illinois | 37–18 | 13–8 | 6th | |
| 2019 | Illinois | 33–25 | 9–14 | T-8th | NCAA Regional |
| 2020 | Illinois | 11–11 | 0–0 | | Season canceled due to COVID-19 |
| 2021 | Illinois | 24–20 | 24–20 | 7th | |
| 2022 | Illinois | 34–22 | 15–7 | 3rd | NCAA Regional |
| 2023 | Illinois | 29–27 | 6–16 | 12th | |
| 2024 | Illinois | 21–31 | 7–15 | 12th | |
| 2025 | Illinois | 22–28 | 6–15 | T-13th | |
| 2026 | Illinois | 15–39 | 3–20 | T-16th | |
| Illinois: | | 301–264 (.533) | 109–134 (.449) | | |
| Total: | | 710–652–1 (.521) | | | |
National champion Postseason invitational champion Conference regular season champion Conference regular season and conference tournament champion Division regular season champion Division regular season and conference tournament champion Conference tournament champion
