= Boo De Oliveira =

American softball coach

Current position
- Title: Assistant Coach
- Team: Notre Dame
- Conference: ACC

Biographical details
- Born: Fort Lauderdale, Florida, U.S.
- Education: Wisconsin

Playing career
- 2003–2006: Wisconsin
- Position: Catcher

Coaching career (HC unless noted)
- 2006: Edgewood College (asst.)
- 2007: MATC
- 2008–2010: Purdue (asst.)
- 2011–2013: North Carolina (asst.)
- 2014–2015: Arizona State (asst.)
- 2016: Arkansas (asst.)
- 2017–2023: Purdue
- 2025–Present: Notre Dame (asst.)

Head coaching record
- Overall: 161–210 (.434)

Boo Gillette De Oliveira is an American, former collegiate softball catcher and former softball head coach originally from Fort Lauderdale, Florida. She is the former head coach for the Purdue Boilermakers softball team. Oliveira played college softball at Wisconsin from 2002 to 2005 and was a two-time All-Big Ten Conference honored player. She was the head coach at Madison Area Technical College in 2007. She is now an assistant coach at Notre Dame.

== Coaching career ==
=== Arkansas ===
On July 2, 2015, Arkansas announced that Oliveira would be added to the Arkansas softball staff as an assistant.

=== Purdue ===
On August 4, 2016, Boo De Oliveira was named the head coach of the Purdue Boilermakers softball program.

On May 9, 2023, Purdue announced Oliveira would not return as head coach.

=== Notre Dame ===
On July 16, 2024, Boo De Oliveria was announced as the new pitching coach for the Notre Dame Fighting Irish softball program.

== Statistics ==
Wisconsin Badgers
YEAR	G	AB	R	H	BA	RBI	HR	3B	2B	TB	SLG	BB	SO	SB	SBA
2002	53	156	10	39	.250	9	1	0	5	47	.301%	13	36	0	0
2003	45	125	12	37	.296	18	4	3	4	59	.472%	17	24	5	6
2004	57	177	19	58	.327	34	5	0	14	87	.491%	13	31	0	0
2005	55	177	36	62	.350	34	10	2	10	106	.599%	9	29	0	0
TOTALS	210	635	77	196	.308	95	20	5	33	299	.471%	52	120	5	6

== Head coaching record ==
=== College ===
Record table
Season	Team	Overall	Conference	Standing	Postseason
MATC Wolfpack (North Central Community College Conference) (2007)
2007	MATC	11–8			
MATC:		11–8 (.579)	– (–)		
Purdue Boilermakers (Big Ten Conference) (2017–2023)
2017	Purdue	20–36	9–14	T-9th	
2018	Purdue	16–40	7–15	10th	
2019	Purdue	34–29	6–17	T-9th	NISC Regional
2020	Purdue	15-10			Season cancelled due to the COVID-19 pandemic
2021	Purdue	18–26	18–26	11th	
2022	Purdue	24–31	7–15	11th	
2023	Purdue	23–30	6–17	13th	
Purdue:		150–202 (.426)	53–104 (.338)		
Total:		161–210 (.434)			
National champion Postseason invitational champion Conference regular season champion Conference regular season and conference tournament champion Division regular season champion Division regular season and conference tournament champion Conference tournament champion
