= Loyola Ramblers softball =

College softball team

Loyola Ramblers
- University: Loyola University Chicago
- Head coach: Alicia Abbott (6th season)
- Conference: Atlantic 10
- Location: Chicago, Illinois, US
- Home stadium: Loyola Softball Park (capacity: 500)
- Nickname: Ramblers
- Colors: Maroon and gold

Regular-season conference championships
- Horizon League: 2001, 2002, 2003, 2007, 2011, 2013; Atlantic 10: 2026

The Loyola Ramblers softball is the team represents Loyola University Chicago in the NCAA Division I college softball. The team currently participates in the Atlantic 10 Conference (A-10). From 1987 until 2013, the team was a member of the Horizon League (HL). From 2014 until 2021, the team was a member of the Missouri Valley Conference (MVC). The Ramblers are currently led by head coach Alicia Abbott. The team plays its home games at Loyola Softball Park located on the university's campus.

== History ==
The Ramblers, despite winning the Horizon League regular season championship six times, have failed to win a conference tournament championship or qualify for the NCAA Division I softball tournament.

Since forming a team in 1987, Loyola Chicago has won several different awards across conferences. The Ramblers won four Horizon League Coach of the Year awards, winning in 1993 with Terri Laux, 2001 with Stephenie Henderson, 2007 with Yvette Healy, and in 2011 with Missy Beseres-Dow. The team also won four HL Pitcher of the Year awards, winning in 2002 with Sarah Smith, in 2004 with Lindsey LaChiana, in 2007 with Amy Solava, and in 2012 with Brittany Gardner. Smith and LaChiana both shared their awards with UIC's Alison Aguilar in each respective season. In 2014, Gardner was named Missouri Valley Conference Pitcher of the Year, earning the unique achievement of being named Pitcher of the Year in two different conferences across her career.

On April 20, 2013, it was announced that Loyola Chicago would be switching conferences, joining the Missouri Valley Conference after 27 years in the Horizon League. After a period of success in collegiate sports as a whole, it was announced on November 16, 2021, that the Ramblers would switch conferences again, this time joining the Atlantic 10 Conference.

=== Coaching history ===
Years	Coach	Record	%
1987–1996	Terri Laux	159–279	.363
1997–1999	Jon Cohn	51–95	.349
2000–2002	Stephenie Henderson	69–68	.504
2003–2004	Jamie Gillies	64–52	.552
2005–2010	Yvette Healy	131–172–1	.433
2011–2014	Missy Beseres-Dow	105–99	.515
2015–2019	Jeff Tylka	111–141	.440
2020–present	Alicia Abbott	69–92	.429

== Roster ==
2024 Loyola Ramblers roster
Pitchers: 16 – Andie Broniewicz – Junior; 6 – Bailey Johnson – Senior; 25 – Peyton Pepkowski – Junior; Catchers: 51 – Abbie Gregus – Sophomore; Outfielders: 15 – Katie Mitchell – Freshman; 14 – Riley Owens – Junior; 4 – Sophia Remsik – Senior; 2 – Sierra Sass – Sophomore; 13 – Teagan Sopczak – Senior	Infielders: 21 – Sydney Barnett – Junior; 5 – Bella Crimaldi – Junior; 9 – Skyler Croker – Freshman; 8 – Jocelyn Currie – Junior; 12 – Nat Lesnicki – Freshman; 23 – Hannah Nalley – Junior; 10 – Liz Sedakis – Freshman; 11 – Haley Wallace – Sophomore; Utility: 3 – Ava Bieneman – Junior; 19 – Maddy Hickey – Freshman

== Season-by-season results ==
Record table
Season	Coach	Overall	Conference	Standing	Postseason
Loyola Ramblers (Horizon League) (1987–2013)
1987	Terri Laux	8–21		5th	
1988	Terri Laux	13–23		4th	
1989	Terri Laux	4–42		7th	
1990	Terri Laux	2–28	0–8	7th	
1991	Terri Laux	12–33	3–9	6th	
1992	Terri Laux	22–26	6–4	3rd	
1993	Terri Laux	21–29	8–4	3rd	
1994	Terri Laux	30–19	7–3	2nd	
1995	Terri Laux	31–20	11–7	T–4th	
1996	Terri Laux	16–38	6–8	T–3rd	
1997	Jon Cohn	16–34	4–10	T–5th	
1998	Jon Cohn	12–29	4–8	5th	
1999	Jon Cohn	23–32	8–4	T–2nd	
2000	Stephenie Henderson	25–21	8–4	3rd	
2001	Stephenie Henderson	20–23	10–2	1st	
2002	Stephenie Henderson	24–24	12–2	T–1st	
2003	Jamie Gillies	33–23	16–5	1st	
2004	Jamie Gillies	31–29	14–7	3rd	
2005	Yvette Healy	18–37	8–9	4th	
2006	Yvette Healy	20–41	10–10	T–4th	
2007	Yvette Healy	21–21	14–5	1st	
2008	Yvette Healy	22–25–1	12–7	4th	
2009	Yvette Healy	28–24	14–10	4th	
2010	Yvette Healy	22–24	10–12	7th	
2011	Missy Beseres-Dow	26–26	16–7	1st	
2012	Missy Beseres-Dow	26–23	15–8	2nd	
2013	Missy Beseres-Dow	28–19	16–5	T–1st	
Loyola Ramblers (Missouri Valley Conference) (2014–2022)
2014	Missy Beseres-Dow	25–31	11–15	7th	
2015	Jeff Tylka	15–35	5–21	9th	
2016	Jeff Tylka	21–28	5–19	10th	
2017	Jeff Tylka	27–26	9–17	8th	
2018	Jeff Tylka	23–27	9–16	9th	
2019	Jeff Tylka	25–25	9–16	T–7th	
2020	Alicia Abbott	12–9	0–0	N/A	Season cut short due to COVID-19 pandemic
2021	Alicia Abbott	13–20	8–16	9th	
2022	Alicia Abbott	16–31	9–18	T–8th	
Loyola Ramblers (Atlantic 10 Conference) (2023–present)
2023	Alicia Abbott	28–23	19–6	2nd	
2024	Alicia Abbott	0–0	0–0		
Total:		759–998–1 (.432)			
National champion Postseason invitational champion Conference regular season champion Conference regular season and conference tournament champion Division regular season champion Division regular season and conference tournament champion Conference tournament champion

== See also ==
- List of NCAA Division I softball programs
