= Infield =

Section of the playing field in various sports

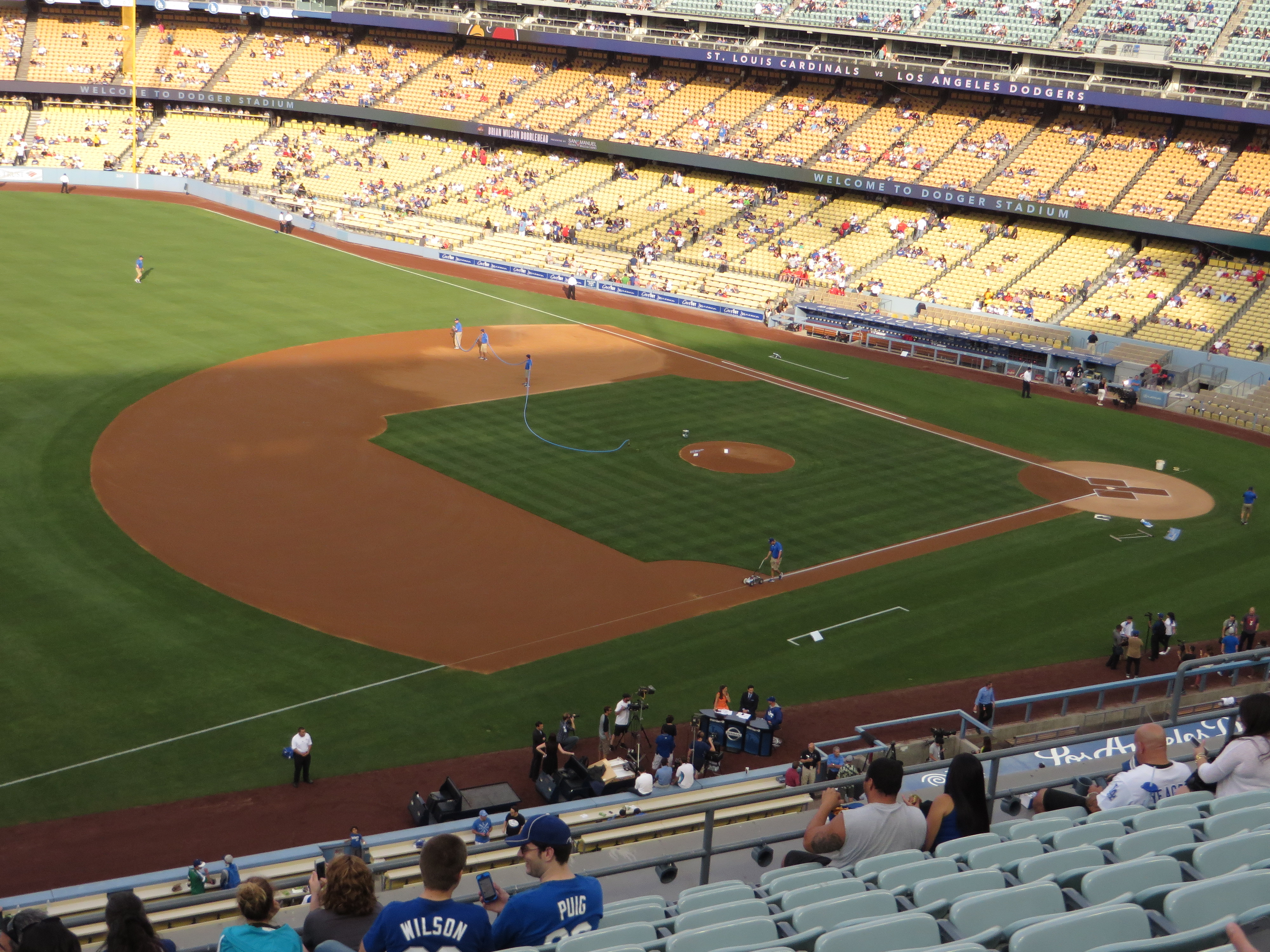
Infield at Dodger Stadium

Infield is a sports term whose definition depends on the sport in whose context it is used.

== Baseball ==
In baseball, the diamond, as well as the area immediately beyond it, has both grass and dirt, in contrast to the more distant, usually grass-covered, outfield. The "diamond" can also refer to the defensive unit of players that are positioned in the region: first baseman, second baseman, shortstop, third baseman. Sometimes it includes the catcher and pitcher who (as a tandem) are often referred to separately as the battery.

In baseball, the physical infield is where most of the action in a baseball game occurs, as it includes that area where the all-important duel between the pitcher and batter takes place. The pitcher stands on the pitcher's mound (a raised mound of dirt located at the center of the infield) and from there he pitches the ball to his catcher, who is crouched behind home plate sixty feet, six inches away at what might be called the cutlet of the diamond-shaped baseball field. To the left and right of the catcher are chalk boxes in the dirt called batter's boxes. The opposing team's batter must stand in one of the two boxes and from there he will attempt to hit the pitched ball with his bat. The umpire, who officiates the game, stands behind the catcher. The other important parts of the infield are the three bases, first base (to the pitcher's left, looking toward home plate), second base (behind the pitcher) and third base (to the pitcher's right). Together, home plate and the three bases form a diamond around the pitcher, with each side of the diamond measuring 90 feet (27 m).

== Cricket ==
In cricket, the infield is a central oval on the field, the reference point for fielding restrictions in short forms of the game, in contrast to the more distant outfield.

== Tracks ==
The infield can refer to a region inside a closed race track used for horse racing or auto racing, or to an area encircled by the track of a roller coaster.
