= Chinazo Cunningham =

American doctor (born 1968)

Chinazo Opia Cunningham
- Born: Chinazo Opia; May 17, 1968 (age 58); Nigeria
- Education: Northwestern University; University of California, San Francisco; Yeshiva University
- Children: 3
- Awards: Member, National Academy of Medicine (2024)
- Scientific career
- Fields: Internal medicine Addiction medicine
- Workplaces: New York State Office of Addiction Services and Supports, Albert Einstein College of Medicine
- Website: oasas.ny.gov/meet-executive-staff-0

Chinazo Opia Cunningham (née Opia, born May 17, 1968) is a physician, researcher, public health professional and Professor of Medicine at Albert Einstein College of Medicine in New York City. She worked on the frontlines during the HIV/AIDS crisis in San Francisco, and in 2020 worked on the frontlines of the COVID-19 pandemic in New York City. She also specializes in treating patients with addiction, having developed and overseen a network using buprenorphine to treat people with opioid addiction.

== Early life and education ==
Cunningham was born in Nigeria right before her parents fled the country with her two sisters during the Biafra conflict. Her mother, a United States citizen, was working in Nigeria as a member of the U.S. Peace Corps and relocated the family to Cupertino, California. Her Nigerian father escaped the country by boat and rejoined his family in California, though their marriage ended in divorce shortly after. Cunningham attended Monta Vista High School in Cupertino, California where she became a varsity softball athlete.

In 1990, Cunningham received a B.A. in psychology from Northwestern University, where she had a full athletic scholarship for softball, as a pitcher and catcher, and became a four-time All-Big Ten honoree. In 1990, she was named a first-team Academic All-American for her academic and athletic achievements. In 2009, she was inducted into Northwestern's Athletic Hall of Fame.

In 1994, Cunningham received a M.D. from University of California, San Francisco. She continued her training as an intern at San Francisco General Hospital before moving to New York City for her residency in internal medicine at New York University. In 2008, She earned an M.S. in clinical epidemiology from Yeshiva University's Albert Einstein College of Medicine.

== Career ==
In 1998, Cunningham began practicing medicine at Montefiore Medical Center in The Bronx and began teaching medicine as a Professor at Albert Einstein College of Medicine. There, she has specialized in working with patient populations struggling with homelessness, poverty, addiction, and HIV/AIDS, working to make healthcare more accessible to them. During her tenure, she has worked to develop policies and programs to meet their healthcare needs. She has also worked to educate the healthcare community on adopting opioid treatments, such as those leveraging the opioid agonist buprenorphine, and reducing the stigma around existing treatments.

In 2021, Cunningham became the Executive Deputy Commissioner for Mental Hygiene at the New York City Department of Health and Mental Hygiene, where she oversaw public health in New York City related to substance use and mental health. In 2021, she was nominated by Governor Kathy Hochul and confirmed by the New York State Legislature as commissioner of the New York State Office of Addiction Services and Supports. In her role as commissioner, she oversees addiction services across New York State, including a budget of $1.3 billion, and over 1700 programs that serve more than 730,000 individuals. Cunningham was one of only 100 individuals worldwide elected to the National Academy of Medicine in 2024, one of the highest honors in the fields of health and medicine, and recognized her outstanding professional achievement and commitment to service.

=== Research on addiction ===
In addition to treating patients with substance abuse disorders, Cunningham has conducted research and published over 150 peer-reviewed articles that focus on strategies for treating and reducing the likelihood of addiction, while investigating how to promote adoption of these strategies. She has a structured and evidence-based curriculum around strategies to treat addiction. She has also studied the roles of bias and discrimination in treatment of patients battling addiction.

Cunningham and her colleagues have studied the policy implications of legalizing medical marijuana. In 2014, they published an analysis of opioid-related deaths from 1999 to 2010 and found that fatalities were lowered in states that had passed medical cannabis laws. The study suggested that access to medical marijuana could reduce the need for prescription painkillers. The study later came under scrutiny when a 2019 study found that states that introduced medical marijuana laws between 2010 and 2017, the number of opioid overdoses increased. Cunningham noted that the conflicting findings necessitate more research into the impacts of medical marijuana, which is currently difficult because of regulations around cannabis.

Cunningham led one of the only federally-funded studies on the use of marijuana for pain management. In 2017, she was awarded a five-year, $3.8 million grant from the National Institute on Drug Abuse to investigate the effect of medical marijuana on a cohort of 250 patients in New York State with chronic pain, some of whom are HIV positive and others HIV negative. These patients are otherwise likely to receive opioids to manage their pain, so Cunningham and her colleagues are exploring the impact of medical marijuana as a substitute for pain management and reducing dependency on opioids.

She has also studied the addictive potential of benzodiazepines, a class of anti-anxiety medications such as Xanax and Valium. She and her colleagues analyzed prescription data and the number of overdoses between 1996 and 2013 and found the rate of overdose fatalities due to benzodiazepines rose faster than the rate of prescriptions.

=== COVID-19 ===
Since New York City became the United States' epicenter of the COVID-19 pandemic, Cunningham has worked to treat patients with the disease. In April 2020, she and her colleagues wrote about the toll working on the frontlines had taken on their mental health and their ability to treat their patients, in a perspective piece for the Annals of Internal Medicine. She also noted that the pandemic had had negative consequences for those in treatment for addiction, as recovering addicts no longer had access to support groups. She has advocated for the need for outpatient clinics to begin providing refills of buprenorphine prescriptions without requiring visits to the doctor, which could jeopardize their safety by forcing them out of their homes.

== Leadership ==
Cunningham has applied her expertise to advocating for policies and programs that address addiction in New York City and across the United States. She has noted the importance of integrating addiction treatment into the rest of the medical system to facilitate holistic care of patients fighting addiction.

In 2015, she was appointed to Mayor Bill de Blasio's ad hoc Task Force Heroin and Prescription Opioid Public Awareness, working to expand access to buprenorphine and naloxone to treat opioid use disorders and deaths due to overdoses, while raising awareness of these treatments and destigmatizing their use. She served as a reviewer of the 2016 Centers for Disease Control and Prevention (CDC) guidelines for primary care physicians prescribing opioids for chronic pain management, and served as the chair of the Opioid Workgroup for the CDC's 2022 clinical guidelines for prescribing opioids for pain. In 2018, Cunningham was appointed to the CDC Board of Scientific Counselors of the National Center for Injury Prevention and Control, which she co-chaired in 2021, to advise on approaches to address the opioid epidemic in the United States.

== Selected works and publications ==
- Tobias, Carol R.; Cunningham, William; Cabral, Howard D.; Cunningham, Chinazo O.; Eldred, Lois; Naar-King, Sylvie; Bradford, Judith; Sohler, Nancy L.; Wong, Mitchell D.; Drainoni, Mari-Lynn (June 2007). "Living with HIV But Without Medical Care: Barriers to Engagement". AIDS Patient Care and STDs. 21 (6): 426–434. doi:10.1089/APC.2006.0138. PMID 17594252.
- Netherland, Julie; Botsko, Botsko; Egan, James E.; Saxon, Andrew J.; Cunningham, Chinazo O.; Finkelstein, Ruth; Gourevitch, Mark N.; Renner, John A.; Sohler, Nancy; Sullivan, Lynn E.; Weiss, Linda; Fiellin, David A. (21 August 2008). "Factors affecting willingness to provide buprenorphine treatment". Journal of Substance Abuse Treatment. 36 (3): 244–251. doi:10.1016/j.jsat.2008.06.006. PMC 2866292. PMID 18715741.
- Bachhuber, Marcus A; Saloner, Brendan; Cunningham, Chinazo O.; Barry, Colleen L. (1 October 2014). "Medical cannabis laws and opioid analgesic overdose mortality in the United States, 1999-2010". JAMA Internal Medicine. 174 (10): 1668–1673. doi:10.1001/JAMAINTERNMED.2014.4005. PMC 4392651. PMID 25154332.
- Bachhuber, Marcus A; Hennessy, Sean; Cunningham, Chinazo O.; Starrels, Joanna L. (1 April 2016). "Increasing Benzodiazepine Prescriptions and Overdose Mortality in the United States, 1996–2013". American Journal of Public Health. 106 (4): 686–688. doi:10.2105/AJPH.2016.303061. PMC 4816010. PMID 26890165.
- Cunningham, Chinazo O.; Diaz, Chanelle; Slawek, Deepika E. (13 April 2020). "COVID-19: The Worst Days of Our Careers". Annals of Internal Medicine. 172 (11): 764–765. doi:10.7326/M20-1715. PMC 7161307. PMID 32282870. Archived from the original on 23 April 2020.
