= Ralph Neely =

American football player (1943–2022)

No. 73
- Positions: Tackle, Guard

Personal information
- Born: September 12, 1943; Little Rock, Arkansas, U.S.
- Died: January 5, 2022 (aged 78); Richardson, Texas, U.S.
- Listed height: 6 ft 6 in (1.98 m)
- Listed weight: 265 lb (120 kg)

Career information
- High school: Farmington (Farmington, New Mexico)
- College: Oklahoma (1961-1964)
- NFL draft: 1965: 2nd round, 28th overall pick
- AFL draft: 1965: 2nd round, 15th overall pick

Career history
- Dallas Cowboys (1965–1977)

Awards and highlights
- 2× Super Bowl champion (VI, XII); 3× First-team All-Pro (1967–1969); Second-team All-Pro (1966); 2× Pro Bowl (1967, 1969); NFL 1960s All-Decade Team; Consensus All-American (1964); Second-team All-American (1963); 2× First-team All-Big Eight (1963, 1964); Second-team All-Big Eight (1962)

Career NFL statistics
- Games played: 172
- Games started: 168
- Fumble recoveries: 5
- Return yards: 48
- Stats at Pro Football Reference

Ralph Eugene Neely (September 12, 1943 – January 5, 2022) was an American professional football player who was an offensive tackle for the Dallas Cowboys in the National Football League (NFL). He played 13 seasons and 172 games for the Cowboys from 1965 to 1977.

== Early life ==
Neely was born on September 12, 1943, in Little Rock, Arkansas. His family moved to New Mexico for the sake of his brother, who suffered from asthma. Neely attended Farmington High School in New Mexico, where he was an All-State tackle for two years (1960-61) in football, and a standout All-State center for the basketball team. He went to the state AA football championship game in 1960. He was also on the school’s baseball team and was a shot putter in track and field.

Neely was inducted into Farmington’s sports Hall of Fame in 1987. He was honored by Farmington during a ceremony in 2016 for his career and time at Farmington. He presented Farmington with a golden football as part of the NFL’s Super Bowl High School Honor Roll, Neely having played in four Super Bowls. In 2014, he was inducted into the New Mexico Sports Hall of Fame.

== College ==
He was recruited by the University of Oklahoma, where he played college football under coaches Bud Wilkinson and Gomer Jones. Neely was a 261-pound tackle who played both ways, as a dominant performer on defense and an excellent blocker on offense. He was named the Big Eight sophomore lineman of the year and was a two-time All-American and an All-Conference selection in both 1963-64. He earned his degree with a double major in accounting and finance.

Neely was one of three Sooners stars who missed the 1965 Gator Bowl game against Florida State University. Neely, fullback Jim Grisham and halfback Lance Rentzel signed with professional teams before the game, and were ruled ineligible for the contest, which Florida State won 36–19 on the strength of four touchdown catches by Fred Biletnikoff.

== Professional career ==
In 1965, he was drafted in the second round of both the 1965 NFL draft (by the Baltimore Colts) and the 1965 AFL draft (by the Houston Oilers). On August 29, 1965, the Colts traded his NFL contractual rights to the Dallas Cowboys in exchange for Billy Lothridge and a fourth-round selection ( No. 54-Rod Sherman) in the 1966 NFL draft.

Neely accepted the Oilers contract offer (which also included rights to own a Houston gas station), but requested it be kept secret to remain eligible to play in the Gator Bowl. When he learned that the Colts traded his rights to the Cowboys, he began negotiating with Dallas, and returned his check to the Oilers. Litigation ensued between the Oilers and Cowboys in regards to his rights.

A rookie in 1965, he joined the Cowboys just as they were beginning their ascent in the NFL, became an immediate starter at right offensive tackle and was named to the NFL All-Rookie team. With great quickness for his size, he became a dominant player on the Cowboys offensive line for 13 seasons.

One of the terms of the merger agreement between the NFL and the AFL was that the Neely contract dispute be resolved. In 1966, the Cowboys finally agreed with the Oilers to send multiple draft choices (a first ( No. 23-Tom Regner), second (No. 49-Roy Hopkins) and two fifth round choices (No. 119-Willie Parker and No.127-Zeke Moore) in the 1967 NFL draft), pay all of the court costs and to start the annual pre-season game the Governor's Cup between the two teams.

Neely was a four-time All-Pro and a two-time Pro Bowler in 1967 and 1969. In 1969, backup tight end Rayfield Wright replaced an injured Neely at right tackle for three games. In 1970, Neely was moved to right guard during training camp, because of the improved play of Rayfield Wright at right tackle, in order for the team to have the best player combination possible in the offensive line. Neely originally moved to right guard to replace an injured teammate. He later replaced Tony Liscio who had a back injury at left offensive tackle during the fifth game of that season. The move became permanent and Neely manned the position until 1977, while continuing to be one of the NFL's premier offensive linemen.

He was injured halfway into the Cowboys victorious 1971 Super Bowl season, when he fractured his left leg in an off-road motorcycle accident; forcing him to miss the last 7 games, the playoffs and the Super Bowl. Liscio came out of retirement to replace Neely.

After moving from right to left tackle, Neely was not selected to the Pro Bowl or as an All-Pro again. The Cowboys president and general manager Tex Shramm observed that Neely’s move to left tackle hampered his effectiveness, but he did it for the sake of the team. Shramm called Neely’s willingness to change positions to his personal detriment “‘one of the great sacrifices in sport…”

In 1977, Neely retired after the Cowboys won Super Bowl XII against the Denver Broncos. He was selected to the NFL 1960s All-Decade Team, though Neely has yet to join his bookend partner Wright, in the Pro Football Hall of Fame or in the Dallas Cowboys Ring of Honor.

== Later life and death ==
In 2018, the Professional Football Researchers Association named Neely to the PFRA Hall of Very Good Class of 2018.

Neely suffered a series of serious health problems during and after his playing career. He joined a lawsuit against the NFL for the consequences of head trauma and concussions suffered as a player, which settled in 2016. Neely died on January 5, 2022, at the age of 78. He was living with dementia and the effects of chronic traumatic encephalopathy (CTE) prior to his death.

His linemate Rayfield Wright similarly had numerous concussions as a player, suffered a long period of dementia as well as seizures later in his life, and joined the head injury lawsuit against the NFL. Wright died just a few months after Neely.
