= Kate Drohan =

American softball coach

Current position
- Title: Head coach
- Team: Northwestern
- Conference: Big Ten
- Record: 810–437–2

Biographical details
- Education: Providence (1995)

Playing career
- 1992–1995: Providence
- Position: Outfielder

Coaching career (HC unless noted)
- 1995–1997: Boston College (asst.)
- 1998–1999: Northwestern (asst.)
- 2000–2001: Northwestern (associate)
- 2002–present: Northwestern

Administrative career (AD unless noted)
- 1995–1997: Boston College (Asst. AD for Facilities)

Head coaching record
- Overall: 810–437–2

Accomplishments and honors

Championships
- 5× Big Ten regular season (2006, 2008, 2022, 2023, 2024); 2× Big Ten Tournament (2008, 2023)

Awards
- 6× Big Ten Coach of the Year (2005, 2006, 2019, 2022, 2023, 2024); NFCA's Mideast Region Co-Coaching Staff of the Year (2005); NFCA/Speedline National Coaching Staff of the Year (2006)

Kate Drohan (born December 24, 1973) is an American softball coach and former collegiate softball player who is the current head coach of the Northwestern Wildcats softball team in the Big Ten Conference. She led Northwestern to the 2006 Women's College World Series and a national runner up finish in 2022. She has mentored athletes Tammy Williams and Eileen Canney. She played college softball for the Providence Friars from 1992 to 1995 in the Big East Conference, where she was a three-time All-Conference honoree.

== Early life and education ==
Drohan graduated from Providence College in 1995 with a degree biology. She played softball at Providence, where she was on the All-Big East team in 1992, 1994, and 1995.

== Coaching career ==
=== Northwestern ===
Kate Drohan was promoted to head coach of the Northwestern softball program after the 2001 season, when long time head softball coach Sharon Drysdale retired.

== Statistics ==
=== Providence Friars ===
| YEAR | G | AB | R | H | BA | RBI | HR | 3B | 2B | TB | SLG | BB | SO | SB | SBA |
| 1992 | 52 | 156 | 23 | 42 | .269 | 17 | 0 | 1 | 5 | 49 | .314% | 14 | 16 | 5 | 5 |
| 1993 | 51 | 169 | 23 | 46 | .272 | 11 | 1 | 0 | 7 | 56 | .331% | 11 | 7 | 4 | 7 |
| 1994 | 58 | 176 | 24 | 53 | .301 | 23 | 0 | 1 | 8 | 63 | .358% | 12 | 9 | 8 | 8 |
| 1995 | 55 | 150 | 26 | 38 | .253 | 8 | 0 | 1 | 3 | 43 | .286% | 12 | 10 | 4 | 6 |
| TOTALS | 216 | 651 | 96 | 179 | .275 | 59 | 1 | 3 | 23 | 211 | .324% | 49 | 42 | 21 | 26 |

== Head coaching record ==
=== College ===
Record table
| Season | Team | Overall | Conference | Standing | Postseason |
|---|---|---|---|---|---|
Northwestern Wildcats (Big Ten Conference) (2002–Present)
| 2002 | Northwestern | 24–18–1 | 10–9 | 5th | |
| 2003 | Northwestern | 36–19 | 11–9 | 6th | NCAA Regional |
| 2004 | Northwestern | 34–20 | 12–8 | 4th | NCAA Regional |
| 2005 | Northwestern | 42–18 | 15–3 | 2nd | NCAA Super Regional |
| 2006 | Northwestern | 50–15 | 16–3 | 1st | Women's College World Series Runner-Up |
| 2007 | Northwestern | 52–13 | 15–3 | 2nd | Women's College World Series |
| 2008 | Northwestern | 40–16 | 18–2 | 1st | NCAA Super Regional |
| 2009 | Northwestern | 31–15 | 14–6 | 3rd | NCAA Regional |
| 2010 | Northwestern | 25–23 | 10–8 | 4th | |
| 2011 | Northwestern | 23–20 | 5–13 | 10th | |
| 2012 | Northwestern | 29–29 | 14–10 | 4th | NCAA Regional |
| 2013 | Northwestern | 31–22 | 12–10 | 5th | |
| 2014 | Northwestern | 35–18 | 14–9 | 5th | NCAA Regional |
| 2015 | Northwestern | 28–23 | 14–8 | 4th | NCAA Regional |
| 2016 | Northwestern | 27–28 | 15–8 | 3rd | NCAA Regional |
| 2017 | Northwestern | 25–29 | 10–13 | 8th | |
| 2018 | Northwestern | 38–19 | 14–8 | 4th | NCAA Regional |
| 2019 | Northwestern | 47–13 | 21–2 | 2nd | NCAA Super Regional |
| 2020 | Northwestern | 11–12 | 0–0 | | Season cancelled due to the COVID-19 pandemic |
| 2021 | Northwestern | 30–17 | 29–15 | 3rd | NCAA Regional |
| 2022 | Northwestern | 45–11 | 19–4 | 1st | Women's College World Series |
| 2023 | Northwestern | 42–13 | 20–3 | 1st | NCAA Super Regional |
| 2024 | Northwestern | 36–13 | 20–3 | 1st | NCAA Regional |
| 2025 | Northwestern | 30–20–1 | 16–6 | T-4th | NCAA Regional |
| 2026 | Northwestern | 29–20 | 16–8 | T-5th | |
| Northwestern: | | 840–457–2 (.647) | 360–171 (.678) | | |
| Total: | | 840–457–2 (.647) | | | |
National champion Postseason invitational champion Conference regular season champion Conference regular season and conference tournament champion Division regular season champion Division regular season and conference tournament champion Conference tournament champion
