= Minnesota Golden Gophers softball =

- 2026 Minnesota Golden Gophers Season
- Founded: 1974 (52 years ago)
- University: University of Minnesota
- Head coach: Gretta Melsted
- Conference: Big Ten
- Location: Minneapolis, Minnesota, US
- Home stadium: Jane Sage Cowles Stadium (capacity: 1,000)
- Nickname: Golden Gophers
- Colors: Maroon and gold

NCAA WCWS appearances
- 2019

AIAW WCWS appearances
- 1976, 1978

NCAA super regional appearances
- 2014, 2019

NCAA Tournament appearances
- 1988, 1991, 1996, 1998, 1999, 2002, 2003, 2013, 2014, 2015, 2016, 2017, 2018, 2019, 2021, 2022, 2023

Conference tournament championships
- 1999, 2014, 2016, 2017, 2018

Regular-season conference championships
- 1986, 1988, 1991, 2017

The Minnesota Golden Gophers softball is the team that represents the University of Minnesota in National Collegiate Athletic Association (NCAA) Division I competition. College softball became a varsity sport at the University of Minnesota in 1974 now more than 50 years ago.

== History ==
=== Coaching history ===
Years	Coach	Record	%
1974–1975, 1977–1989	Linda Wells	350–264–1	.570
1976	Jenny Johnson	16–4	.800
1990–1991	Teresa Wilson	79–59	.572
1992–1998	Lisa Bernstein	239–182–1	.568
1999–2010	Lisa Bernstein & Julie Standering	356–300–2	.543
2011–2017	Jessica Allister	290–107	.730
2018–2020	Jamie Trachsel	102–40–1	.717
2021–2026	Piper Ritter	175–158–2	.525
2027–present	Gretta Melsted	0–0	–

== Championships ==
=== Conference Championships ===
Season	Conference	Record	Head coach
1986	Big Ten Conference	15–9	Linda Wells
1988	Big Ten Conference	15–8	Linda Wells
1991	Big Ten Conference	20–4	Teresa Wilson
2017	Big Ten Conference	22–1	Jessica Allister

=== Conference tournament championships ===
Year	Conference	Tournament Location	Head coach
1999	Big Ten Conference	Ann Arbor, MI	Lisa Bernstein & Julie Standering
2014	Big Ten Conference	Evanston, IL	Jessica Allister
2016	Big Ten Conference	State College, PA	Jessica Allister
2017	Big Ten Conference	Ann Arbor, MI	Jessica Allister
2018	Big Ten Conference	Madison, WI	Jamie Trachsel

== Coaching staff ==
Name	Position Coached	Consecutive season at Minnesota in current position
Piper Ritter	Head coach	4th (17th at Minnesota)
Carly Wynn	Associate Head Coach	2nd
Annie Smith	Assistant coach	2nd
Bailey Oetting	Assistant coach	2nd
Brooklyn Daly	Graduate assistant	1st

== Roster ==
2024 Golden Gophers Roster
#	Name	Position	Year	Height	Hometown	High School/Previous Team
1	Breezy Burnett	OF	SO	5'7	Jacksonville, Florida	Trinity Christian Academy
2	Sydney Strelow	INF	GR	5'4	Kenosha, Wisconsin	Bradford High School
3	Addison Leschber	INF	SO	5'8	Thrall, Texas	Thrall High School
4	Maggie Werner	INF	SO	5'10	Greenville, Wisconsin	Hortonville High School
5	Morgan DeBord	OF	GR	5'2	Hillsboro, Oregon	Loyola Marymount
6	Lucy Hooper	INF	FR	5'2	Valley Center, Kansas	Valley Center High School
7	Cameron Grayson	UT/RHP	FR	5'5	Noblesville, Indiana	Noblesville High School
8	Tara Wolocko	C/UT	FR	5'3	Kingwood, Texas	Kingwood High School
9	Jess Oakland	INF	SO	5'9	San Jose, California	Saint Francis High School
11	Sydney Schwartz	P/INF	SO	5'10	Victoria, Minnesota	Chanhassen, Minnesota
12	Macy Richardson	UT/RHP	FR	5'6	Tecumseh, Nebraska	Sterling Public Schools
13	Taylor Krapf	C	JR	6'0	Oviedo, Florida	Duke
16	Lacie Lilyquist	INF	FR	5'4	Hudson, Wisconsin	Hudson High School
17	Maddy Ehlke	INF	SR	5'10	Green Bay, Wisconsin	Bay Port High School
18	Reili Gardner	OF	SR	5'6	Dyersville, Iowa	Illinois State
19	Delanie Cox	UT	GR	5'6	Aurora, Colorado	Cherokee Trail High School
21	Nani Valencia	INF	JR	5'7	Georgetown, Kentucky	Scott County High School
22	Bri Enter	P	GR	5'4	Jacksonville, Florida	Florida State
23	Jacie Hambrick	P	SR	5'10	Dewey, Arizona	Grand Canyon
33	Brooklyn Jones	OF	FR	5'5	Ramsey, Minnesota	Anoka High School
77	Kayla Chavez	INF	JR	5'6	Chino, California	Chino Hills High School
81	Jessica Snippes	RHP	FR	5'9	Rosemount, Minnesota	Rosemount High School

== Notable players ==
=== National awards ===
NFCA Catcher of the Year

- Kendyl Lindaman (2017)

=== Conference awards ===
Big Ten Player of the Year

- Barb Drake, 1986
- Kari Blank, 1991
- Sara Groenewegen, 2015
- Kendyl Lindaman, 2017, 2018
- Jess Oakland, 2024

Big Ten Pitcher of the Year

- Sara Groenewegen, 2014, 2017
- Amber Fiser, 2019
- Autumn Pease, 2023

Big Ten Freshman of the Year

- Brenda Bixby, 1988
- Sara Moulton, 2011
- Sara Groenewegen, 2014
- Maddie Houlihan, 2016
- Kendyl Lindaman, 2017

Big Ten Coach of the Year

- Linda Wells, 1988
- Teresa Wilson, 1991
- Jessica Allister, 2017
