= Jessica Allister =

American softball coach & player (born 1982)

Current position
- Title: Head coach
- Team: Stanford
- Conference: Pac-12
- Record: 248–129 (.658)

Biographical details
- Born: October 7, 1982 (age 44); Moscow, Idaho, U.S.

Playing career
- 2001–2004: Stanford
- 2004–2005: New England Riptide
- Position: Catcher

Coaching career (HC unless noted)
- 2005–2006: Georgia (asst.)
- 2007–2009: Stanford (asst.)
- 2010: Oregon (asst.)
- 2011–2017: Minnesota
- 2018–present: Stanford

Head coaching record
- Overall: 538–236 (.695)
- Tournaments: NCAA Division I: 11–11 (.500)

Accomplishments and honors

Championships
- 3× Big Ten Tournament (2014, 2016, 2017); Big Ten regular season (2017)

Awards
- As player: Second-team All-American (2004); First-team All-Pac-10 (2004); 2× honorable mention All-Pac-10 (2002, 2003); Second-team NFCA Pacific All-Region (2001); As head coach: Big Ten Coach of the Year (2017); Pac-12 Coach of the Year (2019)

Jessica Lynne Allister (born October 7, 1982) is an American softball coach and former catcher who is the current head coach at Stanford. Allister played college softball at Stanford and earned second-team All-American honors in her senior season of 2004. After a two-year professional softball career with the New England Riptide of National Pro Fastpitch, Allister began a coaching career as an assistant coach at Georgia, Stanford, and Oregon.

From 2011 to 2017, Allister was head coach at Minnesota, where she had 290 wins and five consecutive NCAA Tournament appearances from 2013 to 2017. The 2017 Minnesota team set new program records, including single season wins with a 56–5 record, for which Allister won Big Ten Coach of the Year honors. Allister then returned to Stanford to become head coach at her alma mater. Inheriting a struggling Stanford program, Allister led Stanford to an NCAA Tournament appearance in her second season in 2019 and won Pac-12 Coach of the Year honors as a result.

== Early life and education ==
Allister was born in 1982, when her father Derek Allister was a graduate student at the University of Idaho and assistant basketball coach at Moscow High School in Moscow, Idaho. Allister spent her childhood in the Palouse, San Francisco Bay Area, and Reno, Nevada, when her father was an assistant men's college basketball coach at Washington State, California, and Nevada. At age 11, she moved to Nacogdoches, Texas, when Derek became an assistant coach at Stephen F. Austin in 1993. Allister attended Nacogdoches High School from 1996 to 2000, when Derek was head coach at Stephen F. Austin.

At Stanford University, Allister had a stellar playing career for the Stanford Cardinal softball team. Allister holds the school record for games played with 266. A three-time all-conference selection, she led her team to four appearances in the NCAA tournament and to two trips to the 2001 Women's College World Series. She was the starter for the Cardinal from day one to the end of her playing career. Allister earned second-team NFCA All-American honors and first-team All-Pac-10 honors in 2004, her senior season during which Stanford again made the Women's College World Series. Allister graduated with her name all throughout the program’s record book, including top-three in many offensive categories (including home runs and RBI) and top-ten in several others. Allister graduated in 2004 with a degree in economics.

== Professional playing career ==
Allister played the 2004 and 2005 summer seasons as a member of the New England Riptide of National Pro Fastpitch. In 87 games, Allister had a .197 batting average, 12 RBI, one home run, and a .987 fielding percentage.

== Coaching career ==
=== Early coaching career (2005–2010) ===
Allister’s first coaching job was with the University of Georgia under coach Lu Harris-Champer in 2005 and 2006, helping lead the Georgia Bulldogs to consecutive NCAA tournament appearances as well as an SEC championship.

Following her stint with the Bulldogs, Allister went back to her alma mater and joined John Rittman’s coaching staff at Stanford. Under Allister’s tutelage, Rosey Neill won back-to-back conference Defensive Player of the Year honors in 2008 and 2009. Allister was also a part of the 2009 West Regional Coaching Staff of the Year, as awarded and honored by the NFCA. Allister’s streak of appearances in the NCAA tournament continued, as the Cardinal made the postseason tournament in all three seasons.

Allister’s third assistant coaching position was in 2010 at the University of Oregon as hitting coach, recruiting coordinator, and primary contact for admissions, compliance, and eligibility.

=== Minnesota (2011–2017) ===
On August 10, 2010, the University of Minnesota hired Allister hired as the head coach of Minnesota Golden Gophers softball.

In seven seasons at Minnesota from 2011 to 2017, Allister had a career win–loss record of 290–107 and led Minnesota to a program record five straight NCAA Tournaments from 2013 to 2017. The 2013 Minnesota team went 36–19 (14–6 in Big Ten Conference games), the first winning record in conference play since 2003. In 2017, Minnesota set numerous records with a 56–5 record and achieved the first no. 1 national ranking in program history. Under Allister, Minnesota pitcher Sara Groenewegen earned multiple yearly awards including 2015 Big Ten Player of the Year and three consecutive first-team All-American honors from 2015 to 2017. Allister was the Big Ten Coach of the Year in 2017.

=== Stanford (2018–present) ===
On July 18, 2017, Allister began her third stint with Stanford softball, this time as head coach. Inheriting a team that went 19–32 (2–22 in Pac-12 Conference play), Allister led the 2018 Stanford team to a 24–31 (3–21 Pac-12) record. In her second season as head coach, Stanford improved to 33–20 (8–13 Pac-12) and appeared in the NCAA Tournament for the first time since 2013, for which Allister won Pac-12 Coach of the Year honors. Stanford began the 2020 season 22–4 before the 2019–20 college sports season was canceled due to COVID-19.

== Head coaching record ==
Record table
Season	Team	Overall	Conference	Standing	Postseason
Minnesota Golden Gophers (Big Ten Conference) (2011–2017)
2011	Minnesota	31–24	9–11	T–6th	
2012	Minnesota	31–22	10–14	T–9th	
2013	Minnesota	36–19	14–6	3rd	NCAA Regional
2014	Minnesota	44–12	16–6	3rd	NCAA Super Regional
2015	Minnesota	49–11	20–3	2nd	NCAA Regional
2016	Minnesota	43–14	19–3	2nd	NCAA Regional
2017	Minnesota	56–5	21–1	1st	NCAA Regional
Minnesota:		290–107 (.730)	109–44 (.712)		
Stanford Cardinal (Pac-12 Conference) (2018–2024)
2018	Stanford	24–31	3–21	8th	
2019	Stanford	33–20	8–13	5th	NCAA Regional
2020	Stanford	22–4	0–0		Season canceled due to COVID-19
2021	Stanford	33–22	9–12	6th	NCAA Regional
2022	Stanford	39–20	11–13	4th	NCAA Super Regional
2023	Stanford	47–15	14–10	T–4th	Women's College World Series
2024	Stanford	50–17	17–3	2nd	Women's College World Series
Stanford Cardinal (Atlantic Coast Conference) (2025–present)
2025	Stanford	42–13	16–8	T–4th	NCAA Regional
2026	Stanford	36–12	18–6	T–3rd	
Stanford:		326–154 (.679)	96–86 (.527)		
Total:		616–261 (.702)			
National champion Postseason invitational champion Conference regular season champion Conference regular season and conference tournament champion Division regular season champion Division regular season and conference tournament champion Conference tournament champion
