= Illinois Fighting Illini softball =

- Founded: 2000
- University: University of Illinois at Urbana–Champaign
- All-time Record: 753–563–2 (.572)
- Head coach: Jenna Hall (1st season)
- Conference: Big Ten
- Location: Urbana, Illinois, US
- Home stadium: Eichelberger Field (capacity: 1500)
- Nickname: Fighting Illini
- Colors: Orange and blue

NCAA Tournament appearances
- 2003, 2004, 2009, 2010, 2016, 2017, 2019, 2022

The Illinois Fighting Illini softball is the team that represents University of Illinois at Urbana–Champaign in NCAA Division I college softball. The team currently participates in the Big Ten Conference. The Fighting Illini are currently led by their head coach Jenna Hall. The team plays its home games at Eichelberger Field located on the university's campus.

On June 2, 2026, the team announced Jenna Hall as its third head coach in team history. Hall was the team's first NFCA All-American and holds the team's single-season batting average record at .481.

== History ==
=== Year-by-year results ===
Season	Coach	Record		Notes
Season	Coach	Overall	Conference	Notes
2000	Terri Sullivan	13-17		Played as NCAA Division I independent
2001	Terri Sullivan	49-23	12-8	3rd in Big Ten Tournament
2002	Terri Sullivan	34-24	10-9	4th in Big Ten Tournament
2003	Terri Sullivan	39-17-1	11-7	T-5th in Big Ten Tournament; NCAA Regionals
2004	Terri Sullivan	45-21-1	14-6	Big Ten Tournament Runner-Up; NCAA Regional Final; Final Rank #17
2005	Terri Sullivan	24-26	4-14	
2006	Terri Sullivan	24-31	8-11	T-5th in Big Ten Tournament
2007	Terri Sullivan	30-25	7-8	T-5th in Big Ten Tournament
2008	Terri Sullivan	30-32	8-12	T-5th in Big Ten Tournament
2009	Terri Sullivan	29-17	12-7	NCAA Regionals
2010	Terri Sullivan	45-8	16-2	NCAA Regionals; Final Rank #25
2011	Terri Sullivan	27-22	9-8	
2012	Terri Sullivan	27-26	12-9	
2013	Terri Sullivan	22-27	5-11	T-9th in Big Ten Tournament
2014	Terri Sullivan	24-26	13-6	T-5th in Big Ten Tournament
2015	Terri Sullivan	26-27	6-10	5th in Big Ten Tournament
2016	Tyra Perry	36-23	12-11	Big Ten Tournament Quarterfinals; NCAA Regionals
2017	Tyra Perry	39-20	14-8	Big Ten Tournament Semifinals; NCAA Regional Final
2018	Tyra Perry	37-18	13-8	Big Ten Tournament Quarterfinals
2019	Tyra Perry	33-25	9-14	Big Ten Tournament Quarterfinals; NCAA Regionals
2020	Tyra Perry	11-11	0-0	Season cancelled/shortened due to COVID-19 pandemic
2021	Tyra Perry	24-20	24-20	
2022	Tyra Perry	34-22	15-7	Big Ten Tournament Quarterfinals; NCAA Regionals
2023	Tyra Perry	29-27	6-16	Big Ten Tournament Quarterfinals
2024	Tyra Perry	21-31	7-15	T-9th in Big Ten Tournament
2025	Tyra Perry	22-28	6-15	
2026	Tyra Perry	14–36	3-17	
2027	Jenna Hall			

=== Coaching history ===
Years	Coach	Record	%
2000–2015	Terri Sullivan	487-368-2	.569
2016–2026	Tyra Perry	301-264	.533
2027-Present	Jenna Hall		

== Coaching staff ==
Name	Position coached	Consecutive season at Illinois in current position
Jenna Hall	Head coach	1st
Yolanda McRae	Assistant coach	1st
Jeremy Manley	Assistant coach	1st
Lilli Piper	Assistant Coach	1st
Madi McCrady	Director of Player Development	1st

== Notable players ==
=== Awards ===
Big Ten Coach of the Year
Terri Sullivan, 2010

NFCA All-Americans
Meredith Hackett, 2010 (First Team)
Jenna Hall, 2006 (First Team)
Nicole Evans, 2017 (Third Team)
Danielle Zymkowitz, 2009, 2011 (Third Team)

== Notable Individual School Records ==
=== Career Records ===
- Most Games Played: Lindsey Hamma (2001-04) - 254
- Highest Batting Average (min 250 at–bats): Danielle Zymkowitz (2008-11) – .384
- Most Home Runs: Nicole Evans (2014-17) - 53
- Most Hits: Danielle Zymkowitz (2008-11) - 277
- Most Stolen Bases: Danielle Zymkowitz (2008-11) - 91
- Most Pitching Wins: Amanda Fortune (2001-04) - 80
- Most Strikeouts: Sydney Sickels (2019-23) - 714
- Lowest ERA: Amanda Fortune (2001-04) - 1.50

=== Single–Season Records ===
- Most At-Bats: Erin Jones (2001) - 233
- Most RBI's: Angelena Mexicano (2008) - 62
- Most Home Runs: Angelena Mexicano (2008) - 24
- Most Hits: Kiana Sherlund (2018) - 81
- Highest Batting Average: Jenna Hall (2006) - .481
- Most Stolen Bases: Danielle Zymkowitz (2010) - 36
- Most Pitching Wins: Amanda Fortune (2004) - 31
- Most Strikeouts: Monica Perry (2009) - 223
- Lowest ERA: Amanda Fortune (2004) - 1.24
