= Purdue Boilermakers softball =

- Founded: 1994
- University: Purdue University
- Head coach: Magali Frezzotti (3rd season)
- Conference: Big Ten
- Location: West Lafayette, Indiana, US
- Home stadium: Bittinger Stadium (capacity: 1000)
- Nickname: Boilermakers
- Colors: Old gold and black

NCAA Tournament appearances
- 2008, 2009

The Purdue Boilermakers softball team represents Purdue University in NCAA Division I college softball. The team participates in the Big Ten Conference. The Boilermakers are presently led by their head coach Magali Frezzotti. The team currently play their home games at Bittinger Stadium, which is located on the university's campus.

== History ==
=== Coaching history ===
Years	Coach	Record	%
1994–2005	Carol Bruggeman		
2006–2013	Kim Maher	240–204–3	.540
2014–2016	Kim Schuette	85–81–1	.512
2017–2023	Boo De Oliveira	127–172	.425
2023–present	Magali Frezzotti	25–27	.481

== Coaching staff ==
Name	Position coached	Consecutive season at Purdue in current position
Magali Frezzotti	Head coach	1st
Heather Gelbard	Assistant coach	1st
Jordyn Rudd	Assistant coach	1st
Casey Bonk	Director of Operations	1st
