= Wisconsin Badgers softball =

- University: University of Wisconsin–Madison
- All-time Record: 627–591–3 (.515)
- Head coach: Yvette Healy (16th season)
- Conference: Big Ten; Leaders Division
- Location: Madison, Wisconsin, US
- Home stadium: Goodman Softball Complex (capacity: 1,600)
- Nickname: Badgers
- Colors: Cardinal and white

NCAA Tournament appearances
- 2001, 2002, 2005, 2013, 2014, 2017, 2018, 2019, 2022, 2026

Conference tournament championships
- 2013

The Wisconsin Badgers softball is the team that represents the University of Wisconsin–Madison in NCAA Division I college softball. The team participates in the Division of the Big Ten Conference. The Badgers are currently their led by head coach Yvette Healy. The team plays its home games at the Goodman Softball Complex which is located on the university's campus.

== Year-by-year results ==
Record table
Season	Team	Overall	Conference	Standing	Postseason
Karen Gallagher (Big Ten Conference) (1996–2005)
1996	Karen Gallagher	14–39–1	3–21	10th	
1997	Karen Gallagher	32–25	10–13	T-6th	
1998	Karen Gallagher	19–31–1	8–16	T-8th	
1999	Karen Gallagher	29–21	11–12	6th	
2000	Karen Gallagher	34–25	9–6	5th	
2001	Karen Gallagher	33–27	9–11	T-5th	NCAA Regional
2002	Karen Gallagher	31–22	11–6	4th	NCAA Regional
2003	Karen Gallagher	19–26	7–13	8th	
2004	Karen Gallagher	29–28	6–14	10th	
2005	Karen Gallagher	31–24	11–9	5th	NCAA Regional
Karen Gallagher:		271–268–2 (.503)	85–121 (.413)		
Chandelle Schulte (Big Ten Conference) (2006–2010)
2006	Chandelle Schulte	22–22	6–11	10th	
2007	Chandelle Schulte	27–20	6–12	9th	
2008	Chandelle Schulte	15–40	3–17	11th	
2009	Chandelle Schulte	15–40	3–17	11th	
2010	Chandelle Schulte	20–31	5–13	8th	
Chandelle Schulte:		99–153 (.393)	23–70 (.247)		
Yvette Healy (Big Ten Conference) (2011–Present)
2011	Yvette Healy	30–23	9–11	T-6th	
2012	Yvette Healy	34–19	13–10	T-6th	
2013	Yvette Healy	44–13	16–7	4th	NCAA Regional
2014	Yvette Healy	36–20	15–7	4th	NCAA Regional
2015	Yvette Healy	21–31	5–17	13th	
2016	Yvette Healy	28–24–1	11–11–1	8th	
2017	Yvette Healy	35–17	11–11	6th	NCAA Regional
2018	Yvette Healy	29–23	11–9	7th	NCAA Regional
2019	Yvette Healy	43–14	15–8	5th	NCAA Regional
2020	Yvette Healy	14-10*	0-0*		season canceled due to COVID-19 pandemic
2021	Yvette Healy	18-22	18-22	9th	B1G-only schedule played
2022	Yvette Healy	43–14	15–8	8th	NCAA Regional
Yvette Healy:		375–230–1 (.620)	139–121–1 (.534)		
Total:		745–651–3 (.534)			
National champion Postseason invitational champion Conference regular season champion Conference regular season and conference tournament champion Division regular season champion Division regular season and conference tournament champion Conference tournament champion

== Championships ==
=== Conference tournament championships ===
Year	Conference	Tournament location	Head coach
2013	Big Ten	Lincoln, NE	Yvette Healy

== Coaching staff ==
Name	Position coached	Consecutive seasons at Wisconsin in current position
Yvette Healy	Head coach	9th
Danielle Zymkowitz	Assistant coach	3rd
Mike Roberts	Assistant coach	4th
Karla Beasley	Volunteer Assistant Coach	1st
Jeff Zuhlke	Strength coach	8th
Ashley Parr	Athletic Trainer	15th
Ryan Gilles	Sports Operation Coordinator	5th

== Notable players ==
Big Ten Player of the Year

- Kayla Konwent, 2019

== See also ==
- List of NCAA Division I softball programs
