= Northwestern Wildcats softball =

Northwestern Wildcats
- University: Northwestern University
- Head coach: Kate Drohan (25th season)
- Conference: Big Ten
- Location: Evanston, Illinois, US
- Home stadium: Sharon J. Drysdale Field (capacity: 1,000)
- Nickname: Wildcats
- Colors: Purple and white

NCAA WCWS runner-up
- 2006

NCAA WCWS appearances
- 1984, 1985, 1986, 2006, 2007, 2022

NCAA super regional appearances
- 2005, 2006, 2007, 2008, 2019, 2022, 2023

NCAA Tournament appearances
- 1984, 1985, 1986, 1987, 2000, 2003, 2004, 2005, 2006, 2007, 2008, 2009, 2012, 2014, 2015, 2016, 2018, 2019, 2021, 2022, 2023, 2024, 2025

Conference tournament championships
- 1982, 2008, 2023

Regular-season conference championships
- 1982, 1984, 1985, 1986, 1987, 2006, 2008, 2022, 2023, 2024

The Northwestern Wildcats softball team is an NCAA Division I college softball team and they are part of the Big Ten Conference. They play their home games at Sharon J. Drysdale Field in Evanston, Illinois. They have an overall record of 836-629-4.

== History ==
The program was founded in 1976, posting a 1-6 record, and was coached by Mary Conway. Conway coached for 3 years until Sharon J. Drysdale took the helm in 1979. Drysdale arrived at Northwestern in 1979 and spent the next 23 season building a program that would see 14 winning seasons under her tutelage. By 1984, Drysdale had taken a program still in its infancy and earned a berth to the NCAA championships. They finished a then-program-best third that season, setting a Women's College World Series benchmark that no Big Ten team would surpass for two decades. She would return to the Women's College World Series two more times in her career, adding a fifth-place finish in 1985 and sixth-place finish in 1986. Drysdale's 'Cats also reached regional playoffs two times- 1987 and 2000. Named Big Ten Coach of the Year three teams (1984, 1987, and 1995), Drysdale reached many personal milestones in the latter portion of her career. She hit the 500-victory mark in a 4-0 win over Loyola-Chicago on April 10, 1996. And in her final year at the helm she picked up win 700 in a 4-2 decision over Indiana. However, Drysdale says the honors and awards earned by her players mean more to her than her own. There were five All-Americans, two Big Ten Players of the Year, four Big Ten Freshman of the Year, 31 NFCA All-Mideast Region players, and 36 All-Big Ten honorees. Her tenure also included one of the most decorated pitchers in collegiate softball. Lisa Ishikawa was a three-time All-American and during her freshman year she shattered the NCAA mark for strikeouts in a single season with 469. That year alone, she was named Big Ten Female Athlete of the Year, Big Ten Player of the Year, Big Ten Pitcher Year, and Big Ten Freshman of the Year. Off the field, Drysdale was actively involved in NCAA softball rules interpretation. She chaired the NCAA rules committee and was a member of the NFCA Bylaws committee.

== Current team ==
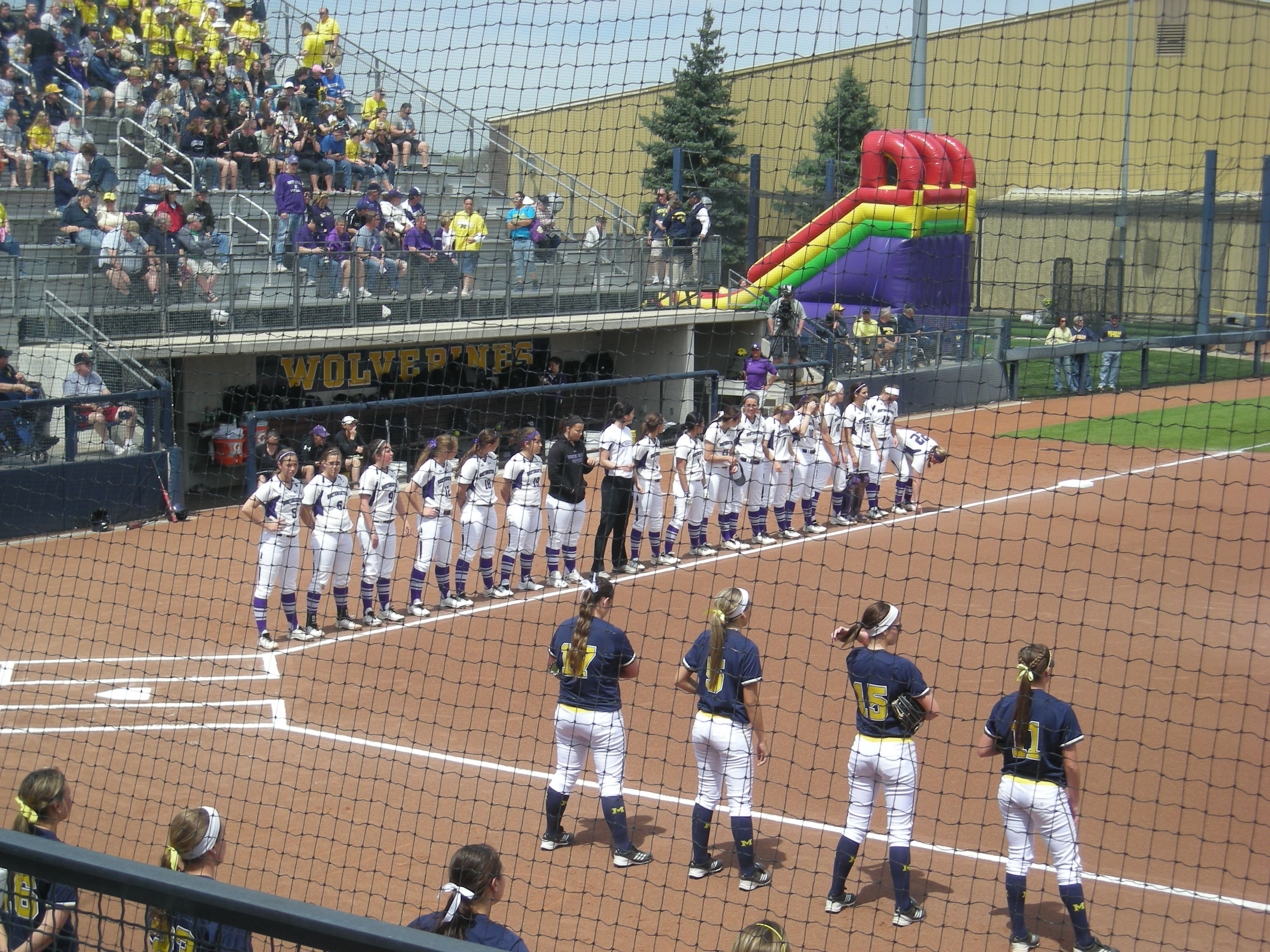
The 2013 team (in white) before a game against Michigan in Ann Arbor.

In 2002, Kate Drohan, former assistant coach under Sharon Drysdale, assumed head coaching duties. Drohan brought on board associate head coach, and twin sister, Caryl Drohan. After 23 seasons as Northwestern's head coach, Kate Drohan's Wildcats have five Big Ten Titles (including each of the past three regular season conference crowns), three Women's College World Series appearances (including one National Championship appearance), seven NCAA Regional Championships, 17 NCAA Tournament appearances, 19 All-America nods, five Big Ten Freshman of the Year awards, six Big Ten Player of the Year awards, and five Big Ten Pitcher of the Year accolades. Drohan has been named Big Ten Coach of the Year six times. Her 2006 coaching staff- including Caryl Drohan, Tori Nyberg, and Amanda Rivera- was the Speedline/National Fastpitch Coaches Association Coaching Staff of the Year.

== Field ==
On May 3, 2001, Anderson Field was renamed Sharon J. Drysdale Field in honor of her 23-year commitment as the Wildcats' head coach. For 1,155 games, Drysdale headed the Northwestern softball program and amassed a 640-512-3 record while sending 5 squads to the NCAA Tournament. Drysdale left Northwestern after the 2001 season to pursue a coaching certification program with the National Fastpitch Coaches Association (NFCA), but her legacy continues to live on at Northwestern. As of Fall 2007, the field is undergoing renovations that will see a new and improved bleacher seating area as well as an enclosed press box to replace the press tent of the past.

== Wildcat honors ==
=== National awards ===
NFCA National Freshman of the Year

- Danielle Williams (2019)

Softball America Freshman of the Year

- Danielle Williams (2019)

Softball America Defensive Player of the Year

- Jordyn Rudd (2021)

=== Conference awards ===
Big Ten Distinguished Scholar-Athletes

- Robin Thompson (2010)
- Kelly Quinn (2011)
- Marisa Bast (2012)
- Marisa Bast, Julia Kuhn, Amanda Mehrsheikh, Kristin Scharkey (2013)
- Sammy Albanese, Marisa Bast, Andrea DiPrima, Julia Kuhn, Paige Tonz (2014)

Big Ten Pitcher of the Year

- Lisa Ishikawa (1984)
- Eileen Canney (2006, 2007)
- Lauren Delaney (2008)
- Danielle Williams (2022)
- Ashley Miller (2024)

Big Ten Player of the Year

- Lisa Ishikawa (1984, 1985)
- Brooke Siebel (2000)
- Garland Cooper (2005, 2006, 2007)
- Tammy Williams (2008, 2009)
- Rachel Lewis (2022)

Big Ten Freshman of the Year

- Lisa Ishikawa (1984)
- Ndidi Opia (1986)
- Chinazo Opia (1987)
- Brooke Siebel (1998)
- Eileen Canney (2004)
- Tammy Williams (2006)
- Nicole Pauly (2007)
- Adrienne Monka (2009)
- Danielle Williams (2019)

Big Ten Coach of the Year

- Sharon Drysdale (1987, 1995)
- Kate Drohan (2005, 2006, 2019, 2022, 2023, 2024)

=== All-Americans ===
- 1982 Sue Hebson (2nd)
- 1984 Lisa Ishikawa
- 1985 Lisa Ishikawa
- 1987 Lisa Ishikawa (2nd)
- 1993 Anne Carpenter (3rd)
- 2005 Garland Cooper, Stephanie Churchwell (2nd), Courtnay Foster (3rd)
- 2006 Eileen Canney (2nd), Garland Cooper (3rd), Tammy Williams (3rd)
- 2007 Eileen Canney (2nd), Garland Cooper (3rd), Tammy Williams
- 2008 Tammy Williams
- 2009 Adrienne Monka, Tammy Williams
- 2011 Adrienne Monka
- 2012 Marisa Bast (3rd)
- 2018 Rachel Lewis (2nd)
- 2019 Danielle Williams (3rd)
- 2022 Rachel Lewis
- 2022 Danielle Williams
- 2024 Kelsey Nader (3rd)

CoSIDA Academic All-District V

- 1989 Chinazo Opia
- 1990 Kim Metcalf, Chinazo Opia
- 2002 Lauren Schwendimann (2nd)
- 2003 Erin Mobley
- 2004 Carri Leto
- 2005 Garland Cooper, Erin Mobley
- 2006 Kristen Amegin, Garland Cooper
- 2007 Garland Cooper
- 2009 Kelly Quinn (2nd)
- 2010 Nicole Pauly (2nd)
- 2011 Robin Thompson
- 2013 Marisa Bast
- 2014 Marisa Bast

CoSIDA Academic All-America

- 1985 Karen Lemke (HM)
- 1989 Chinazo Opia (3rd)
- 1990 Chinazo Opia, Kim Metcalf (3rd)
- 2006 Garland Cooper (3rd)
- 2007 Garland Cooper
- 2011 Robin Thompson (3rd)
- 2013 Marisa Bast (2nd)
- 2014 Marisa Bast (2nd)

NFCA All-America Scholar-Athletes

- 1994 Angela Alessandrini, Shannon Norton
- 1995 Angela Alessandrini, Jennifer Coon, Susan Hofbauer
- 1996 Katie Ballman, Peggy Mandel, Erin Robson
- 1997 Katie Ballman, Lauri Gillis, Tricia Kay, Erin Robson
- 1998 Stacy Austin, Kathryn Breneman
- 1999 Jenni Beseres
- 2012 Sammy Albanese, Marisa Bast, Amanda Mehrsheikh, Kristin Scharkey
- 2013 Sammy Albanese, Emily Allard, Marisa Bast, Julia Kuhn, Mari Majam, Amanda Mehrsheikh, Kristin Scharkey, Paige Tonz, Lauren Tyndall

Women's College World Series All-Tournament Team

- 1984 Lisa Ishikawa
- 2006 Eileen Canney, Garland Cooper, Tammy Williams
- 2007 Tammy Williams

== Wildcats in National Professional Fastpitch ==
- Carri Leto - in 2004, Leto became the first NU female student-athlete to be drafted by a professional franchise. Leto began her professional career with the N.Y./N.J. Juggernaut of National Professional Fastpitch (NPF) and then moved to the Philadelphia Force after two seasons. She is a three-time NPF All-Star and was the named the league's Defensive Player of the Year in 2006. She also played for the New England Riptide.
- Caryl Drohan - current Northwestern Associate Head Coach was an assistant for the Philadelphia Force in 2006. In 2007, she served as an assistant coach for the Chicago Bandits.
- Courtnay Foster - in 2006, Foster was drafted in the NPF, but elected not to play.
- Eileen Canney - in the 2007 draft, Canney was the second overall pick and the first pitcher selected. She played for the New England Riptide.
- Garland Cooper - was the fourth overall pick in the 2007 draft. She joined teammates Eileen Canney and Carri Leto on the New England Riptide which was coached by legendary former NU coach, Sharon Drysdale.
- Tammy Williams - Drafted 10th overall in the 2009 Draft by the Chicago Bandits.
- Nicole Pauly -
- Robin Thompson -
- Adrienne Monka -
- Emily Allard

== Source of information ==
2007 Northwestern Softball Media Guide

== See also ==
- Northwestern Wildcats
- 2007 Women's College World Series
- List of NCAA Division I softball programs
