= Big Sky Conference softball tournament =

American college softball tournament

- Conference softball championship
- Sport: Softball
- Conference: Big Sky Conference
- Number of teams: 6
- Format: Double-elimination tournament
- Current stadium: Miller Ranch Stadium
- Current location: Pocatello, Idaho
- Played: 2013–present
- Last contest: 2025
- Current champion: Idaho State
- Most championships: Weber State (4)

Host stadiums
- Miller Ranch Stadium (2013–15, 2024, 2026); Gloria Rodriguez Field (2025); Wildcat Softball Field (2016–18, 2021–2023); Shea Stadium (2019)

Host locations
- Pocatello, Idaho (2013–15, 2024, 2026); Greeley, Colorado (2025); Ogden, Utah (2016–18, 2021–2023); Sacramento, California (2019)

The Big Sky Conference softball tournament (also referred to as the Big Sky Tournament) is the conference championship tournament in college softball for the Big Sky Conference. It is a double-elimination tournament and seeding is based on regular season records. The winner receives the conference's automatic bid to the NCAA Division I softball tournament.

== Format ==
The top six teams from the regular season compete in the double-elimination tournament.

== Champions ==
=== Year-by-year ===
Year	Champion	Location	MVP
2013	Portland State	Miller Ranch Stadium • Pocatello, ID	Anna Bertrand, Portland State
2014	Southern Utah	Miller Ranch Stadium • Pocatello, ID	Kadi Henderson, Southern Utah
2015	Weber State	Miller Ranch Stadium • Pocatello, ID	MaCauley Flint, Weber State
2016	Weber State	Wildcat Softball Field • Ogden, UT	Aubrey Whitmer, Weber State
2017	Montana	Wildcat Softball Field • Ogden, UT	Michaela Hood, Montana
2018	Sacramento State	Wildcat Softball Field • Ogden, UT	Suzy Brookshire, Sacramento State
2019	Weber State	Shea Stadium • Sacramento, CA	Faith Hoe, Weber State
2020	Canceled due to the COVID-19 pandemic.		
2021	Portland State	Wildcat Softball Field • Ogden, UT	Olivia Grey, Portland State
2022	Weber State	Wildcat Softball Field • Ogden, UT	Arissa Henderson, Weber State
2023	Northern Colorado	Wildcat Softball Field • Ogden, UT	Alyssa Wenzel, Northern Colorado
2024	Northern Colorado	Miller Ranch Stadium • Pocatello, ID	Amailee Morales, Northern Colorado
2025	Weber State	Gloria Rodriguez Field • Greeley, CO	Olivia Birinshaw, Weber State
2026	Idaho State	Miller Ranch Stadium • Pocatello, ID	Ava Brown, Idaho State

=== By school ===
School	Appearances	W	L	Pct	Championships	Years
Idaho State	11	19	18	.514	1	2026
Montana	10	13	16	.448	1	2017
North Dakota	2	1	3	.250	0	—
Northern Colorado	9	17	13	.567	2	2023, 2024
Portland State	10	16	13	.552	2	2013, 2021
Sacramento State	13	17	21	.447	1	2018
Southern Utah	7	8	11	.421	1	2014
Weber State	11	21	7	.750	4	2015, 2016, 2022, 2025

Italics indicates the school currently does not sponsor softball in the Big Sky.
