= 2014 NCAA Division I softball season =

American college softball season

- Defending Champions: Oklahoma

Tournament

Women's College World Series
- Champions: Florida (1st title)
- Runners-up: Alabama (9th WCWS Appearance)
- Winning Coach: Tim Walton (1st title)
- WCWS MOP: Hannah Rogers (Florida)

Seasons
- ← 2013 2015 →

The 2014 NCAA Division I softball season, play of college softball in the United States organized by the National Collegiate Athletic Association (NCAA) at the Division I level, began in February 2014. The season progressed through the regular season, many conference tournaments and championship series, and concluded with the 2014 NCAA Division I softball tournament and 2014 Women's College World Series. The Women's College World Series, consisting of the eight remaining teams in the NCAA Tournament and held in Oklahoma City at ASA Hall of Fame Stadium, ended on June 3, 2014.

== Conference standings ==
2014 American Athletic Conference softball standings
	Conf.				Overall
Team	W		L	PCT	W		L	PCT
UCF ‍†‍‍^{y}	15	–	3	.833	43	–	18	.705
South Florida ‍‍‍^{y}	13	–	5	.722	43	–	17	.717
Louisville ‍‍‡‍^{y}	14	–	7	.667	36	–	22	.621
Houston ‍‍‍^{y}	13	–	8	.619	33	–	23	.589
Rutgers ‍‍‍	9	–	9	.500	28	–	19	.596
Temple ‍‍‍	5	–	13	.278	15	–	30	.333
Memphis ‍‍‍	5	–	15	.250	23	–	33	.411
UConn ‍‍‍	3	–	17	.150	13	–	38	.255
† – Conference champion ‡ – Tournament champion y – Invited to the NCAA tournament As of May 18, 2014; Rankings from USA Today/NFCA Coaches

2014 Big 12 Conference softball standings
	Conf.						Overall
Team	W		L		T	PCT	W		L		T	PCT
No. 5 Oklahoma ‍†‍‍^{y}	16	–	2	–	0	.889	51	–	13	–	0	.797
No. 4 Baylor ‍‍‍^{y}	13	–	5	–	0	.722	49	–	16	–	0	.754
Texas ‍‍‍^{y}	12	–	6	–	0	.667	35	–	23	–	0	.603
Texas Tech ‍‍‍	8	–	10	–	0	.444	35	–	19	–	0	.648
Kansas ‍‍‍^{y}	7	–	11	–	0	.389	34	–	23	–	0	.596
Oklahoma State ‍‍‍	5	–	13	–	0	.278	26	–	28	–	0	.481
Iowa State ‍‍‍	2	–	16	–	0	.111	23	–	31	–	1	.427
† – Conference champion y – Invited to the NCAA tournament Rankings from NFCA

2014 Big Ten Conference softball standings
	Conf.				Overall
Team	W		L	PCT	W		L	PCT
No. 10 Michigan ‍†‍‍^{y}	18	–	5	.783	47	–	15	.758
No. 16 Nebraska ‍‍‍^{y}	18	–	5	.783	44	–	18	.710
No. 15 Minnesota ‍‍‡‍^{y}	16	–	6	.727	44	–	12	.786
Wisconsin ‍‍‍^{y}	14	–	7	.667	36	–	20	.643
Northwestern ‍‍‍	14	–	9	.609	35	–	18	.660
Ohio State ‍‍‍^{y}	13	–	10	.565	30	–	25	.545
Purdue ‍‍‍	13	–	10	.565	27	–	28	.491
Iowa ‍‍‍^{y}	9	–	14	.391	16	–	30	.348
Illinois ‍‍‍	7	–	16	.304	24	–	26	.480
Indiana ‍‍‍	5	–	18	.217	17	–	39	.304
Penn State ‍‍‍	5	–	18	.217	14	–	35	.286
Michigan State ‍‍‍	4	–	19	.174	12	–	37	.245
† – Conference champion ‡ – Tournament champion y – Invited to the NCAA tournament As of May 25, 2014; Rankings from NFCA

2014 Ohio Valley Conference softball standings
	Conf.				Overall
Team	W		L	PCT	W		L	PCT
East
Jacksonville State ‍‍‍	22	–	5	.815	40	–	15	.727
Eastern Kentucky ‍‍‍	15	–	10	.600	29	–	22	.569
Tennessee Tech ‍‍‍	15	–	15	.500	25	–	24	.510
Morehead State + ‍‍‍	9	–	16	.360	15	–	36	.294
Belmont ‍‍‍	7	–	19	.269	13	–	36	.265
Tennessee State ‍‍‍	6	–	20	.231	18	–	38	.321
West
SIU Edwardsville ‡ ‍‍‍	19	–	5	.792	30	–	23	.566
Eastern Illinois ‍‍‍	17	–	7	.708	38	–	17	.691
Murray State ‍‍‍	16	–	9	.640	32	–	23	.582
Tennessee–Martin + ‍‍‍	14	–	10	.583	27	–	27	.500
Austin Peay ‍‍‍	8	–	18	.308	20	–	32	.385
Southeast Missouri St. ‍‍‍	3	–	20	.130	11	–	34	.244
‡ – OVC Tournament champion As of May 17, 2014; Rankings from USA Today/NFCA Coaches; + = Also 1 non=conf. tie

2014 Southeastern Conference softball standings
	Conf.				Overall
Team	W		L	PCT	W		L	PCT
Alabama ‍†‍‍	19	–	5	.792	53	–	13	.803
Tennessee ‍‍‍	17	–	7	.708	46	–	12	.793
Florida ‍‍‍	15	–	9	.625	55	–	12	.821
Georgia ‍‍‍	15	–	9	.625	49	–	15	.766
Missouri ‍‍‍	15	–	9	.625	43	–	18	.705
Kentucky ‍‍‍	13	–	11	.542	50	–	19	.725
LSU ‍‍‍	13	–	11	.542	38	–	24	.613
Auburn ‍‍‍	11	–	13	.458	42	–	19	.689
South Carolina ‍‍‍	11	–	13	.458	36	–	22	.621
Mississippi State ‍‍‍	10	–	14	.417	39	–	21	.650
Texas A&M ‍‍‍	9	–	15	.375	37	–	22	.627
Arkansas ‍‍‍	5	–	19	.208	27	–	28	.491
Ole Miss ‍‍‍	3	–	21	.125	22	–	31	.415
As of Oct 01, 2014; Rankings from Coaches' Poll

2014 Southland Conference softball standings
	Conf.						Overall
Team	W		L		PCT		W	L		PCT
McNeese State ** ‍‍‍	20	–	6	–	0	.769		40	–	17	–	0	.702
Northwestern State ‡ ‍‍‍	15	–	10	–	0	.600		30	–	22	–	0	.577
Sam Houston ‍‍‍	15	–	11	–	0	.577		27	–	27	–	0	.500
Stephen F. Austin ‍‍‍	14	–	11	–	0	.560		26	–	27	–	0	.491
Houston Baptist ‍‍‍	14	–	13	–	0	.519		22	–	28	–	0	.440
Central Arkansas ‍‍‍	13	–	13	–	0	.500		25	–	34	–	0	.424
Abilene Christian* ‍‍‍	10	–	10	–	0	.500		21	–	28	–	0	.429
Lamar ‍‍‍	12	–	14	–	0	.462		20	–	30	–	0	.400
Texas A&M–Corpus Christi ‍‍‍	11	–	15	–	0	.423		16	–	36	–	0	.308
Southeastern Louisiana ‍‍‍	10	–	17	–	0	.370		19	–	29	–	0	.396
Nicholls ‍‍‍	9	–	16	–	0	.360		19	–	34	–	0	.358
Incarnate Word* ‍‍‍	7	–	14	–	0	.333		21	–	31	–	0	.404
‡ – SLC Tournament Champion *ineligible for postseason play due to Div. I transition **Southland Tournament #1 seed champion As of May 4, 2014; Rankings from USA Today/NFCA Coaches

2014 Sun Belt Conference softball standings
	Conf.						Overall
Team	W		L		T	PCT	W		L		T	PCT
No. 8 Louisiana–Lafayette ‍†‍‡‍^{y}	19	–	1	–	0	.950	49	–	10	–	1	.825
No. 23 South Alabama ‍‍‍^{y}	15	–	6	–	0	.714	42	–	14	–	0	.750
Georgia State ‍‍‍	12	–	9	–	0	.571	30	–	26	–	0	.536
Western Kentucky ‍‍‍	11	–	10	–	0	.524	33	–	24	–	1	.578
Texas State ‍‍‍	9	–	12	–	0	.429	26	–	30	–	0	.464
Louisiana–Monroe ‍‍‍	6	–	14	–	0	.300	25	–	27	–	0	.481
Troy ‍‍‍	5	–	13	–	0	.278	22	–	30	–	2	.426
UT Arlington ‍‍‍	4	–	16	–	0	.200	21	–	33	–	0	.389
† – Conference champion ‡ – Tournament champion y – Invited to the NCAA tournament As of March 4, 2019; Rankings from NFCA

== Women's College World Series ==
The 2014 NCAA Women's College World Series took place from May 29 to June 3, 2014 in Oklahoma City.

First round
1	Oregon	3
8	Florida State	0
5	Florida	11
13	Baylor	0 ^{5}
8	Florida State	2
13	Baylor	7
14	Kentucky	4
6	Louisiana–Lafayette	1
7	Oklahoma	2
2	Alabama	6
6	Louisiana–Lafayette	1
7	Oklahoma	3

Second round
1	Oregon	0
5	Florida	4
14	Kentucky	7 ^{8}
13	Baylor	8
14	Kentucky	0
2	Alabama	2
1	Oregon	4
7	Oklahoma	2

Semifinals
5	Florida	6	—
13	Baylor	3	—
2	Alabama	2	—
1	Oregon	0	—

Finals
5	Florida	5	6	—
2	Alabama	0	3	—

== Season leaders ==
Batting

- Batting average: .493 – Courtney Ceo, Oregon Ducks
- RBIs: 83 – Maddie O'Brien, Florida State Seminoles
- Home runs: 25 – Alex Hugo, Georgia Bulldogs

Pitching

- Wins: 38-7 – Lacey Waldrop, Florida State Seminoles
- ERA: 0.94 (26 ER/192.1 IP) – Hannah Campbell, South Alabama Jaguars
- Strikeouts: 354 – Aimee Creger, Tulsa Golden Hurricane

== Records ==
Junior class doubles: 28 – Emilee Koerner, Notre Dame Fighting Irish

== Awards ==
- USA Softball Collegiate Player of the Year:

Lacey Waldrop, FSU Seminoles

YEAR	W	L	GP	GS	CG	SHO	SV	IP	H	R	ER	BB	SO	ERA	WHIP
2014	38	7	48	42	27	8	1	266.1	190	70	43	80	287	1.13	1.01

- Honda Sports Award Softball:

Madison Shipman, Tennessee Lady Vols

YEAR	G	AB	R	H	BA	RBI	HR	3B	2B	TB	SLG	BB	SO	SB	SBA
2014	58	168	56	70	.416	54	18	0	16	140	.833%	46	8	13	17

- NFCA National Freshman of the Year:

Annie Aldrete, Tennessee Lady Vols

YEAR	G	AB	R	H	BA	RBI	HR	3B	2B	TB	SLG	BB	SO	SB	SBA
2014	58	166	37	60	.361	65	19	2	14	135	.813%	29	37	1	1

Kasey Cooper, Auburn Tigers

YEAR	G	AB	R	H	BA	RBI	HR	3B	2B	TB	SLG	BB	SO	SB	SBA
2014	62	177	70	74	.418	77	18	0	10	138	.779%	43	7	2	3

== All America Teams ==
The following players were members of the All-American Teams.

First Team

Position	Player	Class	School
P	Lacey Waldrop	JR.	FSU Seminoles
P	Cheridan Hawkins	SO.	Oregon Ducks
P	Jaclyn Traina	SR.	Alabama Crimson Tide
C	Taylor Edwards	SR.	Nebraska Cornhuskers
1B	Hallie Wilson	JR.	Arizona Wildcats
2B	Alex Hugo	SO.	Georgia Bulldogs
3B	Courtney Ceo	SR.	Oregon Ducks
SS	Sierra Romero	SO.	Michigan Wolverines
OF	Haylie McCleney	SO.	Alabama Crimson Tide
OF	Branndi Melero	JR.	Auburn Tigers
OF	Victoria Hayward	SR.	Washington Huskies
UT	Ally Carda	JR.	UCLA Bruins
UT	Stephany LaRosa	JR.	UCLA Bruins
AT-L	Maddie O'Brien	JR.	FSU Seminoles
AT-L	Madison Shipman	SR.	Tennessee Lady Vols
AT-L	Kelsey Stewart	SO.	Florida Gators
AT-L	Whitney Canion	SR.	Baylor Bears
AT-L	Shelby Pendley	JR.	Oklahoma Sooners

Second Team

Position	Player	Class	School
P	Chelsea Wilkinson	SO.	Georgia Bulldogs
P	Dallas Escobedo	SR.	Arizona State Sun Devils
P	Sara Moulton	SR.	Minnesota Golden Gophers
P	Christina Hamilton	JR.	ULL Ragin' Cajuns
C	Amber Freeman	JR.	Arizona State Sun Devils
1B	Micaela Arizmendi	SO.	Notre Dame Fighting Irish
2B	Hannah Flippen	FR.	Utah Utes
3B	Kaitlyn Richardson	JR.	Minnesota Golden Gophers
SS	Jill Barrett	SR.	Tulsa Hurricanes
OF	Janie Takeda	JR.	Oregon Ducks
OF	Jennifer Gilbert	SR.	Ball State Cardinals
OF	Karley Wester	FR.	Notre Dame Fighting Irish
UT	Jailyn Ford	SO.	James Madison Dukes
UT	Sahvanna Jaquish	FR.	LSU Tigers
AT-L	Kirsten Verdun	SR.	DePaul Blue Demons
AT-L	Kasey Cooper	FR.	Auburn Tigers
AT-L	Annie Aldrete	FR.	Tennessee Lady Vols
AT-L	Haylie Wagner	JR.	Michigan Wolverines

Third Team

Position	Player	Class	School
P	Sara Nevins	SR.	USF Bulls
P	Aimee Creger	SR.	Tulsa Hurricanes
P	Hannah Campbell	SR.	South Alabama Jaguars
C	Lexie Elkins	SO.	ULL Ragin' Cajuns
1B	Melanie Fagaly	SR.	Washington Huskies
2B	Emily Carosone	SO.	Auburn Tigers
3B	Missy Taukeiaho	SO.	Cal State Fullerton Titans
SS	Kellie Fox	JR.	Arizona Wildcats
OF	Emilee Koerner	JR.	Notre Dame Fighting Irish
OF	Taylor Gadbois	SO.	Missouri Tigers
OF	Lindsey Stephens	SO.	Texas Longhorns
UT	Tatum Edwards	SR.	Nebraska Cornhuskers
UT	Kylee Lahners	JR.	Washington Huskies
AT-L	Lauren Chamberlain	JR.	Oklahoma Sooners
AT-L	Shellie Robinson	JR.	USC Upstate Spartans
AT-L	Cassie Tysarczyk	JR.	Texas A&M Aggies
AT-L	Meredith Owen	SR.	Stetson Hatters
