= 2014 NCAA Division I softball tournament =

- Teams: 64
- Finals site: ASA Hall of Fame Stadium; Oklahoma City
- Champions: Florida (1st title)
- Runner-up: Alabama (9th WCWS Appearance)
- Winning coach: Tim Walton (1st title)
- MOP: Hannah Rogers (Florida)

The 2014 NCAA Division I softball tournament was held from May 15 through June 5, 2014 as the final part of the 2014 NCAA Division I softball season. The 64 NCAA Division I college softball teams were selected out of an eligible 293 teams on May 11, 2014. 32 teams were awarded an automatic bid as champions of their conference, and 32 teams were selected at-large by the NCAA Division I Softball Selection Committee. The tournament culminated with eight teams playing in the 2014 Women's College World Series at ASA Hall of Fame Stadium in Oklahoma City.

== New to the tournament ==
This season the number of automatic bids increased from 31 to 32. The change occurred after the original Big East Conference split along football lines into a new non-football Big East Conference and the football-sponsoring American Athletic Conference. Also new this season was the WCC, which began sponsoring softball after the Pacific Tigers returned to the conference. The WCC replaced the Pacific Coast Softball Conference, which dissolved after all its members joined either the WCC or the WAC.

== Automatic bids ==
The Big 12, Big West, Mountain West, Pac-12, and West Coast Conference bids went to the regular season champion. All other conferences had the automatic bid go to the conference tournament winner.

Conference	School
American	Louisville
ACC	Florida State
America East	Albany
Atlantic 10	Fordham
Atlantic Sun	Stetson
Big 12	Oklahoma
Big East	DePaul
Big Sky	Southern Utah
Big South	Charleston Southern
Big Ten	Minnesota
Big West	Long Beach State
Colonial	James Madison
Conference USA	Tulsa
Horizon	Green Bay
Ivy	Dartmouth
Mid-American	Ohio
Metro Atlantic	Iona
Mid-Eastern	Florida A&M
Missouri Valley	Bradley
Mountain West	San Diego State
Northeast	Bryant
Ohio Valley	SIU Edwardsville
Pac–12	Oregon
Patriot	Boston University
SEC	Georgia
Southern	Chattanooga
Southland	Northwestern State
SWAC	Texas Southern
Summit	North Dakota State
Sun Belt	Louisiana–Lafayette
WAC	Utah Valley
WCC	BYU

== National seeds ==
Teams in italics advanced to super regionals. Teams in bold advanced to Women's College World Series.

1. **Oregon**
2. **Alabama**
3. UCLA
4. Georgia
5. **Florida**
6. **Louisiana–Lafayette**
7. **Oklahoma**
8. **Florida State**
9. Arizona State
10. Tennessee
11. Arizona
12. Washington
13. **Baylor**
14. **Kentucky**
15. Missouri
16. Minnesota

== Regionals and super regionals ==
The Regionals took place May 15–18 with Seattle being May 15–17 and all other regionals May 16–18. The super regionals took place from May 22–25.

=== Eugene Super Regional ===
First round	Round 2
1	**Oregon**	**12**
Utah Valley	1 ^{5}
1	**Oregon**	**6**
Wisconsin	1
Albany	0
**Wisconsin**	**1**
Eugene Regional
Utah Valley	3
**Albany**	**4**
Albany	4
**Wisconsin**	**8**
16	**Minnesota**	**10**
Green Bay	1 ^{5}
16	**Minnesota**	**4**
North Dakota State	1 ^{10}
**North Dakota State**	**5**
Auburn	2
Minneapolis Regional
Green Bay	1
**Auburn**	**9** ^{5}
**Auburn**	**1**
North Dakota State	0

Regional finals
1	**Oregon**	**6**	—
Wisconsin	0	—
16	**Minnesota**	3	**8**
Auburn	**4** ^{8}	6

Super regionals
1	**Oregon**	**10**	**6**	—
16	Minnesota	2^{6}	2	—

=== Tallahassee Super Regional ===
First round	Round 2
9	**Arizona State**	**8**
Dartmouth	0 ^{5}
9	**Arizona State**	**4**
Michigan	1
San Diego State	7
**Michigan**	**8** ^{9}
Tempe Regional
Dartmouth	0
**San Diego State**	**8** ^{6}
San Diego State	1
**Michigan**	**9** ^{6}
8	**Florida State**	**6**
Fordham	1
8	**Florida State**	**2**
South Florida	0 ^{11}
**South Florida**	**6**
South Carolina	0
Tallahassee Regional
Fordham	4
**South Carolina**	**5**
South Carolina	2
**South Florida**	**3**

Regional finals
9	Arizona State	3	4
**Michigan**	**4**	**5**
8	**Florida State**	**2**	—
South Florida	1	—

Super regionals
Michigan	**17**	0	2
8	**Florida State**	3 ^{6}	**6**	**4**

=== Gainesville Super Regional ===
Round 1	Round 2
5	**Florida**	**8**
Florida A&M	0 ^{5}
5	**Florida**	**14**
Stetson	0 ^{6}
**Stetson**	**6**
UCF	4
Gainesville Regional
Florida A&M	1
**UCF**	**2**
**UCF**	**6**
Stetson	4
12	**Washington**	**8**
Iona	0 ^{6}
12	**Washington**	**9**
BYU	0 ^{5}
**BYU**	**7**
Northwestern	2
Seattle Regional
Iona	4
**Northwestern**	**14** ^{6}
**Northwestern**	**8**
BYU	3

Regional finals
5	**Florida**	**7**	—
UCF	0	—
12	**Washington**	**9**	—
Northwestern	0 ^{5}	—

Super regionals
5	**Florida**	**9**	3	**8**
12	Washington	0 ^{5}	**4**	0 ^{5}

=== Athens Super Regional ===
Round 1	Round 2
13	**Baylor**	**6**
Northwestern State	1
13	**Baylor**	**2**
Tulsa	1
Houston	1
**Tulsa**	**2**
Waco Regional
Northwestern State	6
**Houston**	**7**
Houston	6
**Tulsa**	**10**
4	**Georgia**	**9**
Chattanooga	0 ^{5}
4	Georgia	4
**NC State**	**5**
UAB	0
**NC State**	**4**
Athens Regional
Chattanooga	2
**UAB**	**9**
UAB	0
4	**Georgia**	**3**

Regional finals
13	**Baylor**	0	**3**
Tulsa	**1** ^{11}	1
NC State	1	0
4	**Georgia**	**9**	**8** ^{5}

Super regionals
13	**Baylor**	**9**	**6**	—
4	Georgia	1 ^{6}	3	—

=== Los Angeles Super Regional ===
Round 1	Round 2
3	**UCLA**	**8**
Southern Utah	0 ^{6}
3	**UCLA**	**7**
Notre Dame	0
Long Beach State	0
**Notre Dame**	**8** ^{6}
Los Angeles Regional
Southern Utah	6
**Long Beach State**	**9**
Long Beach State	1
**Notre Dame**	**10**
14	**Kentucky**	**6**
Ohio	1
14	**Kentucky**	**2**
James Madison	1
DePaul	1
**James Madison**	**6**
Lexington Regional
Ohio	1
**DePaul**	**5**
**DePaul**	**4**
James Madison	3

Regional finals
3	**UCLA**	**1**	—
Notre Dame	0	—
14	**Kentucky**	1	**10**
DePaul	**2** ^{10}	1 ^{5}

Super regionals
3	UCLA	**6**	3	1
14	**Kentucky**	4	**7**	**7**

=== Lafayette Super Regional ===
Round 1	Round 2
11	**Arizona**	**9**
Boston University	6
11	**Arizona**	**9**
LSU	8
Louisville	9
**LSU**	**13**
Tucson Regional
**Boston University**	**8**
Louisville	3
Boston University	3
**LSU**	**8**
6	**Louisiana–Lafayette**	**7**
Texas Southern	4
6	**Louisiana–Lafayette**	**3**
Texas	2
Mississippi State	0
**Texas**	**1**
Lafayette Regional
Texas Southern	3
**Mississippi State**	**5**
Mississippi State	3
**Texas**	**4**

Regional finals
11	**Arizona**	**13**	—
LSU	5 ^{5}	—
6	**Louisiana–Lafayette**	**10**	—
Texas	2	—

Super regionals
11	Arizona	3	1	—
6	**Louisiana–Lafayette**	**5**	**7**	—

=== Norman Super Regional ===
Round 1	Round 2
7	**Oklahoma**	**14**
Bryant	4 ^{5}
7	**Oklahoma**	**9**
Texas A&M	8
Hofstra	6
**Texas A&M**	**7**
Norman Regional
Bryant	6
**Hofstra**	**10**
Hofstra	0
**Texas A&M**	**7**
10	**Tennessee**	**12**
Charleston Southern	3 ^{5}
10	**Tennessee**	**12**
Virginia Tech	0 ^{5}
**Virginia Tech**	**4**
Lipscomb	3
Knoxville Regional
Charleston Southern	2
**Lipscomb**	**4**
**Lipscomb**	**12**
Virginia Tech	3

Regional finals
7	**Oklahoma**	**11**	—
Texas A&M	6	—
10	**Tennessee**	**2**	—
Lipscomb	0	—

Super regionals
7	**Oklahoma**	**8**	0	**8**
10	Tennessee	1	**4**	2

=== Tuscaloosa Super Regional ===
Round 1	Round 2
15	**Missouri**	**6**
Bradley	5 ^{8}
15	**Missouri**	**6**
Kansas	3
**Kansas**	**3**
Nebraska	1
Columbia Regional
Bradley	0
**Nebraska**	**9** ^{5}
**Nebraska**	**2**
Kansas	1
2	**Alabama**	**13**
SIU Edwardsville	3 ^{5}
2	**Alabama**	**7**
USC Upstate	1
**USC Upstate**	**5**
South Alabama	3
Tuscaloosa Regional
SIU Edwardsville	1
**South Alabama**	**5**
**South Alabama**	**5**
USC Upstate	0

Regional finals
15	Missouri	4	1
**Nebraska**	**11**	**8**
2	**Alabama**	**3**	—
South Alabama	0	—

Super regionals
Nebraska	5	1	—
2	**Alabama**	**6** ^{12}	**2**	—

== Women's College World Series ==
The Women's College World Series was held May 29 through June 4, 2014 in Oklahoma City.

=== Participants ===
School	Conference	Record (conference)	Head coach	WCWS appearances† (including 2014 WCWS)	WCWS best finish†	WCWS W–L record† (excluding 2014 WCWS)
Alabama	SEC	50–11 (19–5)	Patrick Murphy	9 (last: 2012)	1st (2012)	13–15
Baylor	Big 12	47–14 (13–5)	Glenn Moore	3 (last 2011)	3rd (2011)	3–4
Florida	SEC	49–12 (15–9)	Tim Walton	6 (last 2013)	2nd (2009, 2011)	12–11
Florida State	ACC	54–7 (24–3)	Lonni Alameda	8 (last 2004)	3rd (2002)	6–14
Kentucky	SEC	47–18 (13–11)	Rachel Lawson	1	—	—
Louisiana–Lafayette	Sun Belt	49–8–1 (19–1)	Michael Lotief	6 (last 2008)	3rd (1993)	6–10
Oklahoma	Big 12	50-11 (16-2)	Patty Gasso	9 (last 2013)	1st (2000, 2013)	16–12
Oregon	Pac-12	54–7–1 (20–3–1)	Mike White	3 (last 2012)	5th (1989, 2012)	2–4

- † = From NCAA Division I Softball Championship Results

=== Bracket ===
First round
**1**	**Oregon**	**3**
8	Florida State	0
**5**	**Florida**	**11**
13	Baylor	0 ^{5}
8	Florida State	2
**13**	**Baylor**	**7**
**14**	**Kentucky**	**4**
6	Louisiana–Lafayette	1
7	Oklahoma	2
**2**	**Alabama**	**6**
6	Louisiana–Lafayette	1
**7**	**Oklahoma**	**3**

Second round
1	Oregon	0
**5**	**Florida**	**4**
14	Kentucky	7 ^{8}
**13**	**Baylor**	**8**
14	Kentucky	0
**2**	**Alabama**	**2**
**1**	**Oregon**	**4**
7	Oklahoma	2

Semifinals
**5**	**Florida**	**6**	—
13	Baylor	3	—
**2**	**Alabama**	**2**	—
1	Oregon	0	—

Finals
5	**Florida**	**5**	**6**	—
2	Alabama	0	3	—

=== Championship Series ===
School	Top Batter	Stats.
Florida	Kristi Merritt (CF)	1-4 3RBIs HR
Alabama	Kaila Hunt (2B)	2-4 2RBIs HR 3B K

School	Pitcher	IP	H	R	ER	BB	SO	AB	BF
Florida	Lauren Haeger	3.0	5	2	2	0	1	15	15
Florida	Delanie Gourley (W)	2.0	0	0	0	1	2	7	8
Florida	Hannah Rogers (SV)	2.0	2	1	1	0	0	8	8
Alabama	Jackie Traina (L)	1.1	6	5	5	1	0	10	11
Alabama	Sydney Littlejohn	4.2	6	1	0	1	1	20	21

== Media coverage ==
=== Radio ===
Westwood One provided nationwide radio coverage of the championship series, which was streamed online at westwoodsports.com and through TuneIn. Kevin Kugler and Leah Amico provided the call for Westwood One.

=== Television ===
ESPN carried every game from the Women's College World Series across the ESPN Networks (ESPN, ESPN2 and ESPNU). The ESPN Networks also carried select regional matches and every super regional match utilizing ESPN, ESPN2, ESPNU and ESPN3. Outside of the ESPN Networks Regional matches, Pac-12 Network picked up all Oregon matches in the Eugene region and BTN picked up the Sunday championship games in the Minneapolis Region.

==== Broadcast assignments ====
Regionals

- Ann Schatz & Tammy Blackburn - Eugene, OR (Oregon games)
- Cara Capuano & Leah O'Brien-Amico - Tuscaloosa, AL
- Tracy Warren & Amanda Freed - Los Angeles, CA
- Melissa Lee & Kayla Braud - Lafayette, LA
- Mark Neely & Jenny Dalton-Hill - Norman, OK
- Pam Ward & Michele Mary Smith - Tallahassee, FL
- Beth Mowins & Jessica Mendoza - Tempe, AZ
- Adam Amin & Amanda Scarborough - Tucson, AZ
- Lisa Byington & Jennie Ritter - Minneapolis, MN (Games 6 & 7)

Women's College World Series

- Pam Ward or Beth Mowins; Jessica Mendoza or Michele Smith; Holly Rowe

Super regionals

- Joe Davis & Leah O'Brien-Amico - Eugene, OR
- Adam Amin & Amanda Scarborough - Tuscaloosa, AL
- Holly Rowe & Amanda Freed - Los Angeles, CA
- Cara Capuano & Cheri Kempf - Athens, GA
- Mark Neely & Jenny Dalton-Hill - Gainesville, FL
- Melissa Lee & Kayla Braud - Lafayette, LA
- Beth Mowins & Jessica Mendoza - Norman, OK
- Pam Ward & Michele Mary Smith - Tallahassee, FL

Women's College World Series championship series

- Beth Mowins, Michele Smith, Jessica Mendoza, Holly Rowe
