= 2014 Southern Utah Thunderbirds softball team =

American college softball season

2014 Southern Utah Thunderbirds softball

2014 Big Sky Tournament Champions

NCAA Regionals
- Conference: Big Sky Conference
- Record: 23–31 (10–6 Big Sky)
- Head coach: Kyle Magnusson (5th season)
- Assistant coaches: Tracee Hoch (2nd season); Jenna Ayers (1st season)
- Home stadium: Kathryn Berg Field

The 2014 Southern Utah Thunderbirds softball team represented Southern Utah University in the 2014 NCAA Division I softball season. Kyle Magnusson entered his fifth season as head coach of the Thunderbirds. The Thunderbirds were picked to finish third in the 2014 Big Sky standings. The Thunderbirds finished third in the conference to qualify for the Big Sky Tournament, where they went 3–1 to win the Big Sky Championship and the automatic bid to the NCAA Tournament. The Thunderbirds claimed the title of the 62-seed and opened competition in the Los Angeles region against top seed UCLA. After going 0–2 in the Los Angeles Regional, the Thunderbirds finished the season 23–31.

== 2014 Roster ==
2014 Southern Utah Thunderbirds Roster
Pitchers: 13 Ashley Ostler – junior; 20 Ariel Hart – senior; 22 Katie Greenberg – junior; 33 Jordan Theurer – sophomore; Catchers: 3 Lyndsey Healey – junior; 11 Ashley Clayson – freshman	Infielders: 0 Madison Resley- Senior; 1 Cora Cordova – senior; 3 Lyndsey Healey – junior; 5 Kadi Henderson – senior; 7 Kelli Hales – sophomore; 12 Terysa Dyer – senior; 18 Meagan Neilson – senior; 23 Sara Park – junior; 33 Jordan Theurer – sophomore	Outfielders: 2 Taylor Dumas – junior; 17 Kylee Wolf – sophomore; 24 Tanisha Anderson – junior

== Schedule ==
Date	Time	Opponent	Site	Result	Attendance	Winning Pitcher	Losing Pitcher
Red Desert Classic
February 6*	2:00 PM	Utah State Aggies	The Canyons Complex • St. George, UT	L 0–8^{5}	N/A	N. Johnson (1-0)	Ariel Hart (0-1)
February 6*	4:30 PM	BYU	The Canyons Complex • St. George, UT	L 2–10^{5}	250	Ashley Thompson (1-0)	Jordan Theurer (0-1))
February 7*	4:00 PM	Nevada Wolfpack	The Canyons Complex • St. George, UT	L 2–4	N/A	Megan Dortch (1-0)	Katie Greenberg (0-1)
February 8*	1:30 PM	East Carolina Pirates	The Canyons Complex • St. George, UT	L 3–6	N/A	Christian (2-1)	Ashley Ostler (0-1)
February 8*	4:00 PM	Nebraska-Omaha Mavericks	The Canyons Complex • St. George, UT	W 5–1	67	Jordan Theurer (1-1)	Barrow (0-1)
February 9*	1:30 PM	Grand Canyon Antelopes	The Canyons Complex • St. George, UT	L 3–7	N/A	Stephanie Pesqueira (1-2)	Katie Greenberg (0-2)
Fresno State Kick-Off
February 15*	4:45 PM	UC Santa Barbara Gauchos	Bulldog Diamond • Fresno, CA	L 0–4	300	Collins (1-1)	Jordan Theurer (1-2)
February 15*	7:00 PM	Fresno State Bulldogs	Bulldog Diamond • Fresno, CA	L 0–2	650	J. Compton (4-1)	Ariel Hart (0-2)
February 16*	10:00 AM	UC Riverside Highlanders	Bulldog Diamond • Fresno, CA	L 2–5	200	Alyssa Razo (2-3)	Ariel Hart (0-3)
GCU Invitational
February 21*	10:00 AM	Nevada Wolfpack	Stapleton-Pierson • Phoenix, AZ	L 4–6	57	K. Jones (2-2)	Ashley Ostler (0-2)
February 21*	12:30 PM	Grand Canyon Antelopes	Stapleton-Pierson • Phoenix, AZ	L 4–9	117	Taylor Nowlin (1-3)	Jordan Theurer (1-3)
February 22*	10:00 AM	Grand Canyon Antelopes	Stapleton-Pierson • Phoenix, AZ	L 4–9	114	Kailey Regester (4-0)	Katie Greenberg (0-3)
February 22*	3:00 PM	Nevada Wolfpack	Stapleton-Pierson • Phoenix, AZ	W 8–6	55	Jordan Theurer (2-3)	M Dortch (4-1)
February 23*	10:00 AM	Nevada Wolfpack	Stapleton-Pierson • Phoenix, AZ	L 0–10^{5}	72	M Isenberg (4-1)	Jordan Theurer (2-4)
February 23*	12:30 PM	Grand Canyon Antelopes	Stapleton-Pierson • Phoenix, AZ	W 9–8	137	Ariel Hart (1-3)	Stephanie Pesqueira (2-4)
Colorado State Classic
March 7*	1:00 PM	Dayton Flyers	Ram Field • Fort Collins, CO	Canceled			
March 7*	3:45 PM	Colorado State Rams	Ram Field • Fort Collins, CO	Canceled			
March 8*	9:00 AM	Nebraska-Omaha Mavericks	Ram Field • Fort Collins, CO	W 8–2	72	Jordan Theurer (3-4)	Lizzie Noble (1-2)
March 8*	1:30 PM	Colorado State Rams	Ram Field • Fort Collins, CO	L 0–8^{5}	142	Larisa Petakoff (2-3)	Ariel Hart (1-4)
March 9*	9:00 AM	Dayton Flyers	Ram Field • Fort Collins, CO	L 9–10	68	Gabrielle Snyder (4-4)	Ashley Ostler (0-3)
Springhill Suites Invitational II
March 14*	4:30 PM	Boise State Broncos	Dona Larsen Park • Boise, ID	L 4–6	224	Rebecca Patton (11-6)	Jordan Theurer (3-5)
March 15*	12:00 PM	Louisiana-Lafayette Ragin' Cajuns	Dona Larsen Park • Boise, ID	W 8–5	205	Katie Greenberg (1-3)	B. Gornick (0-1)
March 15*	4:20 PM	Boise State Broncos	Dona Larsen Park • Boise, ID	L 3–4	370	Rebecca Patton (12-6)	Ariel Hart (1-5)
March 16*	9:30 AM	Louisiana-Lafayette Rajin' Cajuns	Dona Larsen Park • Boise, ID	W 13–5^{5}	135	Ashley Ostler (1-3)	Melissa Robinson (1-4)
March 16*	12:15 PM	Boise State Broncos	Dona Larsen Park • Boise, ID	W 2–1	308	Katie Greenberg (2-3)	MacKenzie McGill (2-3)
Regular Season
March 21	1:00 PM	Weber State Wildcats	Kathryn Berg Field • Cedar City, UT	W 8–7	110	Jordan Theurer (4-5)	Jasmine Ioane (4-2)
March 21	4:00 PM	Weber State Wildcats	Kathryn Berg Field • Cedar City, UT	L 3–8	150	Morgan Allaband (1-3)	Katie Greenberg (2-4)
March 22	7:00 AM	Weber State Wildcats	Kathryn Berg Field • WinCedar City, UT	W 10–5	150	Ariel Hart (2-5)	Jasmine Ionae (4-3)
March 25*	12:00 PM	Utah State Aggies	Gail Miller Field • Provo, UT	W 4–1	104	Jordan Theurer (5-5))	Abby Indreland (1-2)
March 25*	1:00 PM	#3 Oregon Ducks	Gail Miller Field • Provo, UT	L 0–8^{5}	N/A	K. Hovinga (9-1)	Ariel Hart (2-6)
March 28	1:00 PM	Sacramento State Hornets	Shea Stadium • Sacramento, CA	W 6–4	88	Ariel Hart (3-6)	Jennifer Hartman (4-5)
March 28	3:40 PM	Sacramento State Hornets	Shea Stadium • Sacramento, CA	L 3–6	88	Kaitlyn Yerby (3-1)	Jordan Theurer (5-6)
March 29	1:00 PM	Sacramento State Hornets	Shead Stadium • Sacramento, CA	Canceled			
April 4	12:30 PM	Portland State Vikings	Kathryn Berg Field • Cedar City, UT	W 8–0^{5}	42	Ariel Hart (4-6)	K Wright (1-15)
April 4	2:00 PM	Portland State Vikings	Kathryn Berg Field • Cedar City, UT	W 10–2^{5}	42	Katie Greenberg (3-4)	M Masters (1-4)
April 5	12:00 PM	Portland State Vikings	Kathryn Berg Field • Cedar City, UT	W 7–6	46	Ariel Hart (5-6)	M Hendrix (2-5)
April 15*	4:00 PM	BYU Cougars	Gail Miller Field • Provo, UT	L 2–10^{5}	241	McKenna Bull (11-9)	Jordan Theurer (5-7)
April 15*	6:20 PM	BYU Cougars	Gail Miller Field • Provo, UT	L 2–8	241	Tori Almond (4-6)	Katie Greenburg (3-5)
April 17*	3:00 PM	Dixie State Red Storm	Kathryn Berg Field • Cedar City, UT	L 0–3	52	M Duncan (13-1)	Jordan Theurer (5-8)
April 18	12:00 PM	North Dakota	Kathryn Berg Field • Cedar City, UT	W 10–2^{5}	54	Ariel Hart (6-6)	VanDomelen (3-13)
April 18	2:00 PM	North Dakota	Kathryn Berg Field • Cedar City, UT	W 10–2^{5}	54	Katie Greenberg (4-5)	Chewning (0-4)
April 19	12:00 PM	North Dakota	Kathryn Berg Field • Cedar City, UT	W 7–4	58	Ariel Hart (7-6)	VanDomelen (3-14)
April 22*	2:00 PM	Utah Utes	Utah Softball Stadium • Salt Lake City, UT	L 4–12^{5}	186	Nieto (11-11)	Ariel Hart (7-7)
April 22*	4:00 PM	Utah Utes	Utah Softball Stadium • Salt Lake City, UT	L 14–10	194	Katie Greenberg (5-5)	Ramirez (4-4)
April 23*	1:00 PM	Utah Valley	UVU Wolverine Softball Field • Orem, UT	L 3–5	119	Bailey Moore (2-10)	Jordan Theurer (5-9)
April 23*	3:30 PM	Utah Valley Wolverines	UVU Wolverine Softball Field • Orem, UT	W 7–3^{8}	119	Ariel Hart (8-7)	Josi Summers (7-15)
April 26	1:00 PM	Idaho State Bengals	Miller Ranch Stadium • Pocatello, ID	Canceled			
April 26	3:00 PM	Idaho State Bengals	Miller Ranch Stadium • Pocatello, ID	Canceled			
April 27	10:00 AM	Idaho State Bengals	Miller Ranch Stadium • Pocatello, ID	L 3–10	331	Douglas (16-10)	Ariel Hart (8-8)
April 27	12:00 PM	Idaho State Bengals	Miller Ranch Stadium • Pocatello, ID	L 2–3	331	Tolmie (6-2)	Katie Greenberg (5-6)
May 2	1:00 PM	Northern Colorado Bears	Butler-Hancock Sports Pavilion • Greeley, CO	L 1–9^{5}	187	M Wilkinson (11-14)	Ariel Hart (8-9)
May 2	3:00 PM	Northern Colorado Bears	Butler-Hancock Sports Pavilion • Greeley, CO	L 5–6^{9}	213	M Wilkinson (12-14)	Katie Greenberg (5-7)
May 3*	1:00 PM	Northern Colorado Bears	Butler-Hancock Sports Pavilion • Greeley, CO	W 17–5^{6}	215	Jordan Theurer (6-9)	M Wilkinson (12-15)
2014 Big Sky Tournament
May 8	4:00 PM	Sacramento State Hornets	Miller Ranch Stadium • Pocatello, ID	W 5–2	710	Ariel Hart (9-9)	Caitlin Brooks (9-6)
May 9	10:00 AM	Idaho State Bengals	Miller Ranch Stadium • Pocatello, ID	W 8–0^{6}	378	Katie Greenberg (6-7)	Jessica Tolmie (8-4)
May 10	1:00 PM	Idaho State Bengals	Miller Ranch Stadium • Pocatello, ID	L 2–7	791	Haley Douglas (19-10)	Ariel Hart (9-10)
May 10	4:00 PM	Idaho State Bengals	Miller Ranch Stadium • Pocatello, ID	W 8–5	790	Katie Greenberg (7-7)	Jessica Tolmie (8-5)
2014 NCAA Regionals
May 16*	7:00 PM	#3 UCLA Bruins	Easton Stadium • Los Angeles, CA	L 0–8^{6}	722	Hall (16-2)	Katie Greenberg (7-8)
May 17*	4:00 PM	Long Beach State 49ers	Easton Stadium • Los Angeles, CA	L 6–9	1,008	Jones-Wesley	Ariel Hart (9-11)
*Non-Conference Game. All times are in Mountain Time Zone.
