= 2014 Texas Southern Lady Tigers softball team =

American college softball season

2014 Texas Southern Lady Tigers softball
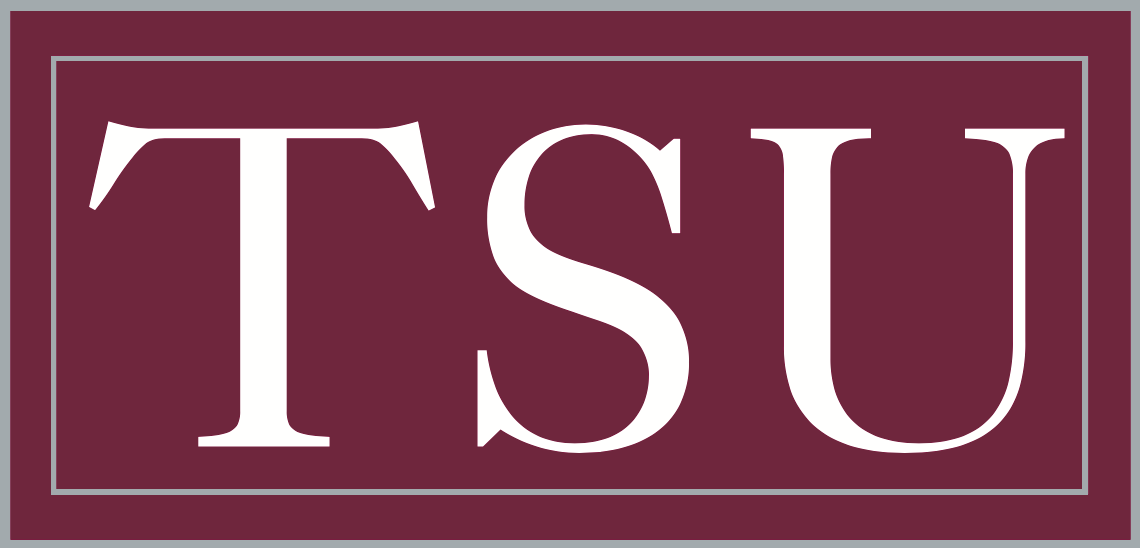

2014 SWAC West Division Champions 2014 SWAC Tournament Champions

NCAA Regionals
- Conference: Southwestern Athletic Conference
- West Division
- Record: 31–20 (15–2 SWAC)
- Head coach: Worley Barker (9th season)
- Assistant coach: Samantha Gonzales (2nd season)
- Home stadium: Memorial Park

The 2014 Texas Southern Lady Tigers softball team represented Texas Southern University in the 2014 NCAA Division I softball season. Worley Barker entered the year as head coach of the Lady Tigers for a 9th consecutive season. The Lady Tigers were picked to first in the West Division of the pre-season conference polls. The Lady Tigers would do so and go on to win the SWAC's automatic berth in the 2014 NCAA Softball Championships. After going 0–2 in the Lafayette Regional, the Lady Tigers finished the season 31–20.

== 2014 Roster ==
2014 Texas Southern Lady Tigers Roster
Pitchers: 20 Madison Staton – sophomore; 28 Alaina Stubblefield – junior; 32 Brianna Bryant – junior; Utilitys: 13 Gisella Paranich – freshman; 24 Janay Logan – freshman	Infielders: 2 Jeniece Tillman – junior; 4 Danya Rogers – junior; 5 Samantha Jimenez – junior; 10 Chelsea Guenther – junior; 12 Fitima Alvizo- Senior; 14 Brianna Simpson – sophomore; 15 Tiffany Marshall – freshman; 16 Kacey Creel – freshman; 19 Kierra Patton – freshman; 21 Princess Daniels – senior; 22 Haley Smith – junior; 23 Blayke McKissic – freshman; 25 Anisha Richardson – freshman; 26 Adrenna Casares – freshman; 27 Brianna Parker – junior; 33 Thomasina Garza – junior	Outfielders: 1 Jessica Miller – junior; 3 Stefanie Milan – junior; 6 Treshea Wilson – freshman; 8 Amber Garza – sophomore; 9 Monica Castillo - RS Junior; 11 Precious Alvio – sophomore; 18 Krystalani Yockman – freshman

== Schedule ==
Date	Time	Opponent	Site	Result	Attendance	Winning Pitcher	Losing Pitcher
Southeastern Louisiana Tournament
February 7*	3:00 PM	Nicholls State Colonels	Chappapella Park • Hammond, LA	W 11–6	75	S. Jimenez (1-0)	H. Haydel
February 7*	6:00 PM	Southeastern Louisiana Lady Lions	Chappapella Park • Hammond, LA	W 11–3^{5}	156	M. Staton (1-0)	T. Stamper
February 8*	10:00 AM	Akron Zips	Chappapella Park • Hammond, LA	W 5–2	N/A	B. Bryant (1-0)	Conrad
February 8*	12:30 PM	UMKC Kangaroos	Chappapella Park • Hammond, LA	L 0–3	N/A	K. Flaws	Stewart (0-1)
February 9*	12:00 PM	Texas Tech Lady Raiders	Chappapella Park • Hammond, LA	L 0–2	75	B. Talley	M. Staton (1-1)
Regular Season
February 18*	3:00 PM	Houston Baptist Huskies	Husky Field • Houston, TX	L 6–14^{5}	300	E. Mueller	B. Bryant (1-1)
February 20*	4:00 PM	Houston-Victoria Jaguars	UHV Field • Victoria, TX	L 6–8	41	Savannah Crittenden	M. Staton (1-2)
February 20*	6:30 PM	Houston-Victoria Jaguars	UHV Field • Victoria, TX	L 4–7	45	Alex Holland	J. Tillman (0-1)
February 22*	1:00 PM	Huston–Tillotson Rams	Memorial Park • Houston, TX	W 8-0^{5}	78	S. Jimenez (2-0)	Kellie Trinidad
February 22*	3:00 PM	Huston-Tilltoson Rams	Memorial Park • Houston, TX	W 9–1^{5}	92	M. Staton (2-2)	Emily Aguero
February 26*	4:00 PM	Stephen F. Austin Ladyjacks	SFA Softball Field • Nacogdoches, TX	L 0–4	72	C. Thomas	Stubblefield (0-1)
Texas Invitational
February 28*	10:00 AM	Louisiana-Monroe Warhawks	Red & Charline McCombs Field • Austin, TX	L 10–11	137	Hamby	M. Staton (2-3)
February 28*	1:00 PM	Southern Miss Golden Eagles	Red & Charline McCombs Field • Austin, TX	L 0–9^{5}	152	S. Rodgers (3-4)	T. Marshall (0-1)
March 1*	10:00 AM	Southern Miss Golden Eagles	Red & Charline McCombs Field • Austin, TX	W 8–5	72	S. Jimenez (3-0)	D. Block
March 1*	1:00 PM	Texas Longhorns	Red & Charline McCombs Field • Austin, TX	L 0–8^{5}	556	Gabby Smith	M. Staton (2-4)
March 2*	8:00 AM	Texas Longhorns	Red & Charline McCombs Field • Austin, TX	L 1–9^{6}	576	Gabby Smith	S. Jimenez (3-1)
Regular Season
March 4*	4:00 PM	Incarnate Word Cardinals	Cardinals Field • San Antonio, TX	Canceled			
March 6*	3:00 PM	Houston Baptist Huskies	Memorial Park • Houston, TX	Canceled			
March 15*	5:00 PM	Northwood Knights	Memorial Park • Houston, TX	Canceled			
March 15*	7:00 PM	Northwood Knights	Memorial Park • Houston, TX	Canceled			
March 18*	6:00 PM	Sam Houston State Bearkats	Bearkat Softball Field • Huntsville, TX	L 3–7^{6}	346	M. Quinn	J. Tillman (0-2)
SWAC Round-Up
March 21	6:30 PM	Jackson State Lady Tigers	Lear Softball Field • Longview, TX	W 2–7	113	Br. Jamerson	S. Jimenez (3-2)
March 22	12:30 PM	Alabama A&M Lady Bulldogs	Lear Softball Field • Longview, TX	W 8–0^{5}	417	B. Bryant (2-1)	Anisa Britt
March 22	3:00 PM	Alcorn State Lady Braves	Lear Softball Field • Longview, TX	W 7–4	211	M. Staton (3-4)	J. Castillo
March 23	10:00 AM	Mississippi Valley State Devilettes	Lear Softball Field • Longview, TX	W 17–4^{5}	135	J. Tillman (1-2)	Waters
March 23	12:30 PM	Alabama State Lady Hornets	Lear Softball Field • Longview, TX	L 1–3	114	Christmann	S. Jimenez (3-3)
Regular Season
March 25*	4:00 PM	Huston–Tillotson Rams	Kriegs Field • Austin, TX	W 8–1	27	Stubblefield (1-1)	Emily Aguero
March 25*	6:00 PM	Huston–Tillotson Rams	Kriegs Field • Austin, TX	W 10–0^{5}	26	M Staton (4-4)	Kellie Trinidad
March 28	3:00 PM	Prairie View A&M Lady Panthers	Lady Panther Softball Field • Prairie View, TX	W 5–0	108	J. Tillman (2-2)	Oli Lacewell
March 29	12:00 PM	Prairie View A&M Lady Panthers	Lady Panther Softball Field • Prairie View, TX	W 13–3	165	B. Bryant (3-1)	Cally Falls
March 29	2:00 PM	Prairie View A&M Lady Panthers	Lady Panther Softball Field • Prairie View, TX	W 9–1^{6}	739	S. Jimenez (4-3)	Saman Arciba
April 1*	4:00 PM	Houston-Victoria Jaguars	Memorial Park • Houston, TX	L 2–4	46	Savannah Crittenden	M. Statton (4-5)
April 1*	6:00 PM	Houston-Victoria Jaguars	Memorial Park • Houston, TX	W 6–2	52	Stubblefield (2-1)	Griffin Gilbert
April 4	3:00 PM	Grambling State Lady Tigers	Lady Tiger Field • Grambling, LA	W 12–3^{6}	52	J. Tillman (3-2)	Perez
April 5	12:00 PM	Grambling State Lady Tigers	Lady Tiger Field • Grambling, LA	W 9–4	48	M. Staton (5-5)	Lowe
April 5	2:00 PM	Grambling State Lady Tigers	Lady Tiger Field • Grambling, LA	W 12–1^{5}	45	S. Jimenez (5-3)	Lowe
April 8*	3:00 PM	Incarnate Word Cardinals	Memorial Park • Houston, TX	L 2–3	54	Brooke DuBois	S. Jimenez (5-4)
April 8*	4:00 PM	Incarnate Word Cardinals	Memorial Park • Houston, TX	W 4–3	45	S. Jimenez (6-4)	Mikaela Flores
April 15*	2:00 PM	Our Lady of the Lake Saints	OLLU Softball Field • San Antonio, TX	W 3–2	27	J. Tillman (4-2)	Ramirez
April 15	4:00 PM	Our Lady of the Lake Saints	OLLU Softball Field • San Antonio, TX	L 2–3	26	Arocha	M. Staton (5-6)
April 18	3:00 PM	Arkansas-Pine Bluff Golden Lady Lions	Memorial Park • Houston, TX	W 14–1^{5}	48	J. Tillman (5-2)	Alexsis McCain
April 19	12:00 PM	Arkansas-Pine Bluff Golden Lady Lions	Memorial Park • Houston, TX	W 9–1^{5}	105	M. Staton (6-6)	Lacie Sutterfield
April 19	2:00 PM	Arkansas-Pine Bluff Golden Lady Lions	Memorial Park • Houston, TX	W 7–3	110	S. Jimenez (7-4)	Alexsis McCain
April 23*	6:30 PM	Sam Houston State Bearkats	Memorial Stadium • Houston, TX	W 6–4	58	Stubblefield (3-1)	A. Neal
April 25	3:00 PM	Southern Lady Jaguars	Memorial Stadium • Houston, TX	W 16–1^{5}	41	M. Staton (7-6)	Kayleigh Thomas
April 26	12:00 PM	Southern Lady Jaguars	Memorial Stadium • Houston, TX	W 15–11	128	Stubblefield (4-1)	Kayleigh Thomas
April 26	4:30 PM	Southern Lady Jaguars	Memorial Stadium • Houston, TX	L 12–1^{5}	125	M. Staton (8-6)	Carla Arismendi
April 30*	4:00 PM	Stephen F. Austin Ladyjacks	Memorial Stadium • Houston, TX	L 6–10	47	C. Thomas	T. Marshall (0-2)
May 2*	4:00 PM	Oklahoma State Cowgirls	Aggie Softball Complex • College Station, TX	L 0–3	100	Simone Freeman	Stubblefield (4-2)
2014 SWAC Tournament
May 7	8:00 PM	Alcorn State Lady Braves	Wilson Morgan Stadium • Decatur, AL	W 10–2^{5}	517	M. Staton (9-6)	J. Castillo
May 8	2:30 PM	Prairie View A&M Lady Panthers	Wilson Morgan Stadium • Decatur, AL	W 11–4	311	T. Marshall (1-2)	Cartwright
May 9	2:00 PM	Prairie View A&M Lady Panthers	Wilson Morgan Stadium • Decatur, AL	W 5–2	517	M. Staton (10-6)	Falls
May 10	10:00 AM	Mississippi Valley State Devilettes	Wilson Morgan Stadium • Decatur, AL	W 6–3	217	M. Staton (11-6)	Rivera
2014 NCAA Regionals
May 16*	6:00 PM	#6 Louisiana-Lafayette Ragin' Cajuns	Lamson Park • Lafayette, LA	L 4–7	1,945	Christina Hamilton	M. Staton (11-7)
May 17*	2:30 PM	Mississippi State Lady Bulldogs	Lamson Park • Lafayette, LA	L 3–5	1,372	Alexis Silkwood	S. Jimenez (7-5)
*Non-Conference Game. All times are in Central Time Zone.

== Television ==
All 5 games during the Texas Invitational aired on Longhorn Network. The SWAC Tournament semifinal game aired on ESPNU. The Lafayette Regionals aired on ESPN3.

Television Broadcast Assignments:

- Louisiana-Monroe: Tyler Denning & Megan Willis
- Southern Miss: Tyler Denning & Megan Willis
- Southern Miss: Tyler Denning & Megan Willis
- Texas: Alex Loeb & Amanda Scarborough
- Texas: Alex Loeb & Amanda Scarborough
- Prairie View A&M (May 9): Melissa Lee & Kayla Braud
- Louisiana-Lafayette: Melissa Lee & Kayla Braud
- Mississippi State: Melissa Lee & Kayla Braud
