= 2014 Texas Longhorns softball team =

American college softball season

2014 Texas Longhorns softball
- Conference: Big 12 Conference
- Record: 35–23 (12–6 Big 12)
- Head coach: Connie Clark (18th season)
- Assistant coaches: Corrie Hill (9th season); Jennifer McFalls (4th season); Shanna Diller (2nd season)
- Home stadium: Red & Charline McCombs Field

2014 Big 12 Conference softball standings
| | Conf. | | | | | | Overall |
| Team | W | | L | | T | PCT | W | | L | | T | PCT |
|---|---|---|---|---|---|---|---|---|---|---|---|---|
| No. 5 Oklahoma ‍†‍‍^{y} | 16 | – | 2 | – | 0 | .889 | 51 | – | 13 | – | 0 | .797 |
| No. 4 Baylor ‍‍‍^{y} | 13 | – | 5 | – | 0 | .722 | 49 | – | 16 | – | 0 | .754 |
| Texas ‍‍‍^{y} | 12 | – | 6 | – | 0 | .667 | 35 | – | 23 | – | 0 | .603 |
| Texas Tech ‍‍‍ | 8 | – | 10 | – | 0 | .444 | 35 | – | 19 | – | 0 | .648 |
| Kansas ‍‍‍^{y} | 7 | – | 11 | – | 0 | .389 | 34 | – | 23 | – | 0 | .596 |
| Oklahoma State ‍‍‍ | 5 | – | 13 | – | 0 | .278 | 26 | – | 28 | – | 0 | .481 |
| Iowa State ‍‍‍ | 2 | – | 16 | – | 0 | .111 | 23 | – | 31 | – | 1 | .427 |
† – Conference champion y – Invited to the NCAA tournament Rankings from NFCA

The 2014 Texas Longhorns softball team represented the University of Texas at Austin in the 2014 NCAA Division I softball season. Connie Clark entered the year as head coach of the Longhorns for an 18th consecutive season. The Longhorns were picked to finish third in the pre-season conference polls. After posting a 12–6 record in conference play, the Longhorns finished exactly where they were picked to finish and qualified for the NCAA softball tournament as an at large bid. The Longhorns would go 2–2 in the Lafayette Region and bow out with a final record of 35–23.

== 2014 roster ==
2014 Texas Longhorns Roster
| Pitchers: 2 Tiarra Davis – freshman; 15 Holly Kern – sophomore; 18 Gabby Smith – junior; 33 Lauren Slatten – freshman; Catchers: 5 Mandy Ogle – senior; 17 Erin Shireman – sophomore; 45 Taylor King – sophomore; Utilitys: 3 Rachel Scott – sophomore; 7 Marlee Gabaldon – junior; 13 Lindsey Stephens – sophomore; 18 Gabby Smith – junior; 48 Stephanie Ceo – sophomore | Infielders: 1 Stephanie Wong – freshman; 2 Tiarra Davis – freshman; 3 Rachel Scott – sophomore; 4 Devon Tunning – freshman; 6 Mickenzi Krpec – freshman; 10 Taylor McAllister – freshman; 11 Taylor Thom – senior; 15 Holly Kern – sophomore; 17 Erin Shireman – sophomore; 22 Karina Scott – senior; 30 Kelli Hanzel – freshman | Outfielders: 1 Stephanie Wong – freshman; 10 Taylor McAllister – freshman; 20 Brejae Washington – senior; 48 Stephanie Ceo – sophomore |

== Schedule ==
| Date | Time | Opponent | Rank^{#} | Site | Result | Attendance | Winning Pitcher | Losing Pitcher |
Regular Season
| February 6* | 6:00 PM | #17 LSU Lady Tigers | #10 | Tiger Park • Baton Rouge, LA | W 6–1 | 1,343 | Gabby Smith (1–0) | Czechner (0–1) |
Louisiana Classic
| February 7* | 11:30 AM | North Carolina Tar Heels | #10 | Lamson Park • Lafayette, LA | W 7–3 | 341 | Lauren Slatten (1–0) | Kendra Lynch (0–1) |
| February 7* | 6:50 PM | #13 Louisiana-Lafayette Ragin' Cajuns | #10 | Lamson Park • Lafayette, LA | W 10–7 | 815 | Tiarra Davis (1–0) | Jordan Wallace (1–1) |
| February 8* | 4:30 PM | #13 Louisiana-Lafayette Ragin' Cajuns | #10 | Lamson Park • Lafayette, LA | W 7–3 | 1,015 | Gabby Smith (2–0) | Stewart (0–1) |
| February 8* | 9:00 PM | Northern Iowa Panthers | #10 | Lamson Park • Lafayette, LA | L 3–6 | 204 | C. Ross (1–0) | Tiarra Davis (1–1) |
| February 9* | 9:00 AM | Purdue Boilermakers | #10 | Lamson Park • Lafayette, LA | L 4–5 | 151 | L. Fecho (1–1) | Lauren Slatten (1–1) |
Regular Season
| February 12* | 7:00 PM | UTSA Roadrunners | #15 | Red & Charline McCombs Field • Austin, TX | W 2–4 | 436 | Merrill (2–0) | Gabby Smith (2–1) |
Texas Classic
| February 14* | 4:00 PM | #7 Kentucky Wildcats | #15 | Red & Charline McCombs Field • Austin, TX | L 4–6 | 461 | K Nunley (3–0) | Holly Kern (0–1) |
| February 14* | 7:00 PM | IPFW Mastodons | #15 | Red & Charline McCombs Field • Austin, TX | L 2–3 | 583 | M. Kramer (4–0) | Tiarra Davis (1–2) |
| February 15* | 1:00 PM | Louisiana Tech Lady Techsters | #15 | Red & Charline McCombs Field • Austin, TX | W 7–2 | 568 | Lauren Slatten (2–1) | Biance Duran (1–3) |
| February 15* | 4:00 PM | IPFW Mastodons | #15 | Red & Charline McCombs Field • Austin, TX | W 10–2^{5} | 655 | Gabby Smith (3–1) | M. Flenniken (2–1) |
| February 16* | 10:00 AM | #7 Kentucky Wildcats | #15 | Red & Charline McCombs Field • Austin, TX | L 5–6 | 516 | M. Prince (2–0) | Tiarra Davis (1–3) |
Mary Nutter Classic
| February 20* | 12:30 PM | UNLV Rebels | #25 | Big League Dreams Complex • Cathedral City, CA | L 4–5 | 266 | Amanda Oliveto (2–4) | Holy Kern (0–2) |
| February 20* | 3:00 PM | Cal Poly Mustangs | #25 | Big League Dreams Complex • Cathedral City, CA | W 13–7 | 274 | Gabby Smith (4–1) | Sierra Hyland (0–1) |
| February 21* | 12:30 PM | #3 Washington Huskies | #25 | Big League Dreams Complex • Cathedral City, CA | L 2–3 | 373 | Kaitlin Inglesby (4–1) | Tiarra Davis (1–4) |
| February 22* | 11:30 AM | Fresno State Bulldogs | #25 | Big League Dreams Complex • Cathedral City, CA | W 5–0 | 400 | Gabby Smith (5–1) | Jill Compton (4–3) |
| February 23* | 11:00 AM | California Golden Bears | #25 | Big League Dreams Complex • Cathedral City, CA | W 2–5 | 187 | Nisa Ontiveros (5–2) | Tiarra Davis (1–5) |
Texas Invitational
| February 27* | 4:00 PM | Louisiana-Monroe Warhawks | | Red & Charline McCombs Field • Austin, TX | W 6–2 | N/A | Gabby Smith (6–1) | L Hamby (8–2) |
| February 28* | 6:30 PM | Southern Miss Golden Eagles | | Red & Charline McCombs Field • Austin, TX | W 10–2^{5} | 667 | Tiarra Davis (2–5) | S. Robles (1–5) |
| March 1* | 1:00 PM | Texas Southern Lady Tigers | | Red & Charline McCombs Field • Austin, TX | W 8–0^{5} | 556 | Gabby Smith (7–1) | M. Staton (2–4) |
| March 1* | 6:30 PM | Louisiana-Monroe Warhawks | | Red & Charline McCombs Field • Austin, TX | W 9–1^{5} | 716 | Tiarra Davis (3–5) | Wilson (0–1) |
| March 2* | 8:00 AM | Texas Southern Lady Tigers | | Red & Charline McCombs Field • Austin, TX | W 9–1^{6} | 576 | Gabby Smith (8–1) | S. Jimenez (3–1) |
Judi Garman Classic
| March 6* | 7:30 PM | Houston Cougars | | Titan Softball Complex • Fullerton, CA | W 5–1 | 600 | Tiarra Davis (4–5) | Julana Shrum (2–3) |
| March 7* | 12:00 PM | #10 Arizona State Sun Devils | | Titan Softball Complex • Fullerton, CA | L 3–8 | 1,000 | Mackenzie Popescue (12–1) | Gabby Smith (8–2) |
| March 8* | 12:00 PM | #5 Michigan Wolverines | | Titan Softball Complex • Fullerton, CA | L 1–3 | 1,200 | Haylie Wagner (11–0) | Tiarra Davis (4–6) |
| March 8* | 10:00 PM | #6 Washington Huskies | | Titan Softball Complex • Fullerton, CA | L 3–6 | 1,200 | Kaitlin Inglesby (6–1) | Gabby Smith (8–3) |
| March 9* | 4:00 PM | Long Beach State 49ers | | Titan Softball Complex • Fullerton, CA | L 3–4 | 862 | Erin Jones-Wesley (9–2) | Lauren Slatten (2–2) |
Regular Season
| March 11* | 4:00 PM | North Texas Mean Green | | Lovelace Stadium • Denton, TX | W 10–2 | 605 | Tiarra Davis (6–5) | Ashley Kirk (10–3) |
| March 11* | 7:00 PM | North Texas Mean Green | | Lovelace Stadium • Denton, TX | W 2–1 | 605 | Gabby Smith (9–3) | Madison Thompson (2–3) |
| March 15* | 4:00 PM | Iowa Hawkeyes | | Red & Charline McCombs Field • Austin, TX | W 9–1 | 1,050 | Tiarra Davis (6–6) | Kayla Massey (2–7) |
| March 16* | 4:00 PM | Iowa Hawkeyes | | Red & Charline McCombs Field • Austin, TX | L 5–6 | 739 | Starkenberg (2–2) | Tiarra Davis (6–7) |
| March 17* | 7:00 PM | Iowa Hawkeyes | | Red & Charline McCombs Field • Austin, TX | W 3–0 | 523 | Tiarra Davis (7–7) | Kayla Massey (2–8) |
| March 19* | 7:00 PM | Houston Cougars | | Red & Charline McCombs Field • Austin, TX | L 4–5 | 802 | Shrum (4–3) | Lauren Slatten (2–3) |
| March 22 | 11:00 AM | Baylor Lady Bears | | Getterman Stadium • Waco, TX | W 6–5 | 1,306 | Tiarra Davis (8–7) | Canion (12–4) |
| March 26* | 7:00 PM | Texas A&M-Corpus Christi Islanders | | Red & Charline McCombs Field • Austin, TX | W 8–0 | 530 | Tiarra Davis (9–7) | L. Carter (6–12) |
| April 2* | 2:00 PM | Texas State Bobcats | | Red & Charline McCombs Field • Austin, TX | W 19–7^{5} | 572 | Gabby Smith (10–3) | Rayn House (16–12) |
| April 4 | 4:30 PM | Texas Tech Lady Raiders | | Red & Charline McCombs Field • Austin, TX | W 5–1 | 557 | Tiarra Davis (10–7) | G. Aucoin (8–6) |
| April 5 | 4:00 PM | Texas Tech Lady Raiders | | Red & Charline McCombs Field • Austin, TX | L 5–6 | 1,256 | C. Custer (11–5) | Gabby Smith (10–4) |
| April 6 | 12:00 PM | Texas Tech Lady Raiders | | Red & Charline McCombs Field • Austin, TX | W 7–3 | 1,051 | Tiarra Davis (11–7) | C. Custer (11–6) |
| April 11 | 2:00 PM | Iowa State Cyclones | | Cyclone Sports Complex • Ames, IA | W 19–6^{5} | 259 | Gabby Smith (11–4) | Paris Imholz (0–3) |
| April 11 | 5:00 PM | Iowa State Cyclones | | Cyclone Sports Complex • Ames, IA | W 2–0 | 259 | Tiarra Davish (12–7) | Paris Imholz (0–4) |
| April 12 | 3:00 PM | Iowa State Cyclones | | Cyclone Sports Complex • Ames, IA | W 17–1^{5} | 255 | Tiarra Davis (13–7) | Paris Imholz (0–5) |
| April 17 | 8:00 PM | #16 Oklahoma Sooners | | Marita Hynes Stadium • Norman, OK | L 1–4 | 946 | K. Stevens (24–6) | Tiarra Davis (13–8) |
| April 18 | 6:30 PM | #16 Oklahoma Sooners | | Marita Hynes Stadium • Norman, OK | W 9–0^{6} | 1,370 | Tiarra Davis (14–8) | K. Stevens (24–7) |
| April 19 | 6:30 PM | #16 Oklahoma Sooners | | Marita Hynes Stadium • Norman, OK | L 0–8^{5} | 1,396 | K. Stevens (25–7) | Tiarra Davis (14–9) |
| April 23* | 6:00 PM | Texas State Bobcats | | Texas State Softball Stadium • San Marcos, TX | W 15–6^{6} | 803 | Gabby Smith (12–4) | R House (19–17) |
| April 25 | 4:30 PM | Oklahoma State Cowgirls | | Red & Sharline McCombs Field • Austin, TX | L 3–5 | 591 | S. Freeman (20–12) | Tiarra Davis (14–10) |
| April 26 | 4:00 PM | Oklahoma State Cowgirls | | Red & Sharline McCombs Field • Austin, TX | W 12–1^{5} | 930 | Tiarra Davis (15–10) | Whitney Whitehorn (4–8) |
| April 27 | 11:30 AM | Oklahoma State Cowgirls | | Red & Sharline McCombs Field • Austin, TX | W 3–0 | 942 | Gabby Smith (13–4) | Simone Freeman (20–13) |
| May 2 | 7:00 PM | Kansas Jayhawks | | Red & Sharline McCombs Field • Austin, TX | W 2–0 | 792 | Tiarra Davis (16–10) | Kessler (17–13) |
| May 3 | 3:00 PM | Kansas Jayhawks | | Red & Sharline McCombs Field • Austin, TX | L 2–5 | 931 | Kessler (18–13) | Tiarra Davis (16–11) |
| May 4 | 1:00 PM | Kansas Jayhawks | | Red & Sharline McCombs Field • Austin, TX | W 8–0 | 930 | Tiarra Davis (17–11) | Kelsey Kessler (18–14) |
| May 6 | 6:00 PM | Baylor Lady Bears | | Getterman Stadium • Waco, TX | L 1–2 | 1,744 | Canion (26–9) | Tiarra Davis (17–12) |
| May 11 | 1:00 PM | Baylor Lady Bears | | Red & Sharline McCombs Field • Austin, TX | W 3–2 | 1,304 | Tiarra Davis (18–12) | Heather Stearns (13–4) |
2014 NCAA Regionals
| May 16* | 3:00 PM | Mississippi State Lady Bulldogs | | Lamson Park • Lafayette, LA | W 1–0 | 1,945 | Tiarra Davis (19–12) | A. Owen (18–12) |
| May 17* | 12:00 PM | #6 Louisiana-Lafayette Ragin' Cajuns | | Lamson Park • Lafayette, LA | L 2–3 | 1,372 | Hamilton (26–2) | Tiarra Davis (19–13) |
| May 17* | 6:00 PM | Mississippi State Lady Bulldogs | | Lamson Park • Lafayette, LA | W 4–3 | 1,392 | Gabby Smith (14–4) | A. Silkwood (14–8) |
| May 18* | 12:00 PM | #6 Louisiana-Lafayette Ragin' Cajuns | | Lamson Park • Lafayette, LA | L 1–10 | 1,871 | Hamilton (27–2) | Tiarra Davis (19–14) |
*Non-Conference Game. All times are in Central Time Zone.

== TV, radio, and streaming information ==
More than 60% of the Texas schedule would air on television. Below are the announcing assignments for the games that were televised. If a TV station isn't listed, the game aired on Longhorn Network.

- LSU (CST): Lyn Rollins & Yvette Girourd
- UTSA: Carter Blackburn & Cat Osterman
- Texas Classic: Alex Loeb & Amanda Scarborough
- Texas Invitational: Alex Loeb & Amanda Scarborough
- Iowa (Game 1): Alex Loeb & Megan Willis
- Iowa (Game 2): Alex Loeb & Cat Osterman
- Iowa (Game 3): Carter Blackburn & Cat Osterman
- Houston: Carter Blackburn & Cat Osterman
- Baylor (Game 1) (FSSW): John Morris & Megan Turk
- Texas A&M-Corpus Christi: Carter Blackburn & Cat Osterman
- Texas State: Alex Loeb & Cat Osterman
- Texas Tech Series: Alex Loeb & Amanda Scarborough
- Oklahoma (Game 1) (ESPN2): Beth Mowins & Jessica Mendoza
- Oklahoma (Game 2) (FCS Central): Bruce Haertl, Jessica Shults, & Jessica Coody
- Oklahoma (Game 3) (FSN): Brenda VanLengen & Tracy Warren
- Oklahoma State (Games 1–2): Carter Blackburn & Amanda Scarborough
- Oklahoma State (Game 3): Carter Blackburn & Cat Osterman
- Kansas Series: Carter Blackburn & Megan Willis
- Baylor (Game 2) (FSSW+): John Morris & Megan Turk
- Baylor (Game 3): Carter Blackburn & Megan Willis
- Mississippi State (ESPN3): Melissa Lee & Kayla Braud
- Louisiana-Lafayette (ESPN3): Melissa Lee & Kayla Braud
- Mississippi State (ESPN3): Melissa Lee & Kayla Braud
- Louisiana-Lafayette (ESPN3): Melissa Lee & Kayla Braud
