= 2014 Utah Valley Wolverines softball team =

American college softball season

2014 Utah Valley Wolverines softball

2014 WAC Tournament Champions

NCAA Regionals
- Conference: Western Athletic Conference
- Record: 18–42 (5–9 WAC)
- Head coach: Nikki Palmer (1st season)
- Assistant coaches: Aaron Vail (1st season); Ryan Wigley (1st season); Krystin Jachim (1st season)
- Home stadium: UVU Wolverine Softball Field

The 2014 Utah Valley Wolverines softball team represented Utah Valley University in the 2014 NCAA Division I softball season. Nikki Palmer entered the year in her first season as head coach of the Wolverines. The Wolverines entered 2014 as new members of the Western Athletic Conference. The Wolverines were picked to finish third in the 2014 WAC standings. After finishing fifth out of six in the WAC Regular season, the Wolverines shocked everyone going 4–0 in the WAC Tournament to earn the conferences automatic bid to the NCAA Tournament. The Wolverines claimed the title of the 64-seed and opened competition in the Eugene region against top seed Oregon. After going 0–2 in the Eugene Regional, the Wolverines ended the season 18–42.

== 2014 Roster ==
2014 Utah Valley Wolverines Roster
Pitchers: 4 Dara Rahm – senior; 7 Kelsey Lawton – freshman; 12 Josi Summers – freshman; 14 Kailey Christensen – sophomore; 23 Bailey Moore – freshman; Catchers: 13 Kendal Powell – freshman; 21 Jamie North – junior; 25 Rachel Schoonmaker – junior	Infielders: 3 Debra Lovell – senior; 5 Hailey Kofler – freshman; 6 Brianna Gatlin – freshman; 9 Morgan Summers – sophomore; 11 Brittney Vansway – freshman; 15 Amanda Robinson – senior; 22 Courtney Starks – freshman; 24 Megan Ventura – freshman; 29 Dynasty Lauuai – sophomore	Outfielders: 2 Megan Peay – junior; 4 Dara Rahm – senior; 8 Erin Romero – junior; 9 Morgan Summers – sophomore; 10 Joss Flores – freshman; 18 Kelli Fox – junior; 25 Rachel Schoonmaker – junior

== Schedule ==
Date	Time	Opponent	Site	Result	Attendance	Winning Pitcher	Losing Pitcher
Red Desert Classic
February 7*	4:40 PM	Idaho State Bengals	The Canyons Complex • St. George, UT	L 3–7	64	Foster (3-0)	Josi Summers (0-1)
February 8*	1:30 PM	Nebraska-Omaha Mavericks	The Canyons Complex • St. George, UT	L 0–4	47	Elsasser (2-0)	Kelsey Lawton (0-1)
February 8*	4:00 PM	Weber State Wildcats	The Canyons Complex • St. George, UT	L 0–8	125	M. Flint (1-1)	Josi Summers (0-2)
February 9*	10:57 AM	Texas-Arlington Mavericks	The Canyons Complex • St. George, UT	L 0–6	62	Shannon Carrico (2-0)	Josi Summers (0-3)
February 9*	1:30 PM	Nevada Wolfpack	The Canyons Complex • St. George, UT	L 0–9^{5}	59	Dortch (2-0)	Kailey Christensen (0-1)
Easton Desert Classic
February 14*	7:30 PM	Long Beach State 49ers	Stephanie Lynn Craig Softball Complex • Henderson, NV	L 1–8	N/A	Jones-Wesley (1-2)	Josi Summers (0-4)
February 15*	4:45 PM	Toledo Rockets	Stephanie Lynn Craig Softball Complex • Henderson, NV	L 1–3	N/A	Anderson (1-1)	Bailey Moore (0-1)
February 15*	7:15 PM	UNLV Rebels	Eller Media Stadium • Las Vegas, NV	L 2–7	526	A. Oliveto (1-3)	Josi Summers (0-5)
February 16*	9:00 AM	Ohio State Buckeyes	Stephanie Lynn Craig Softball Complex • Henderson, NV	L 0–8^{6}	131	Hursh (2-2)	Kelsey Lawton (0-2)
February 16*	11:30 AM	Boise State Broncos	Stephanie Lynn Craig Softball Complex • Henderson, NV	L 1–8	103	R. Patton (4-2)	Josi Summers (0-6)
Louisville Slugger Classic
February 27*	2:15 PM	UC Santa Barbara Gauchos	49er Softball Complex • Long Beach, CA	L 0–7	N/A	Collins (4-1)	Kailey Christensen (0-3)
February 27*	7:00 PM	Long Beach State 49ers	49er Softball Complex • Long Beach, CA	L 0–8^{6}	341	Hansen (6-3)	Bailey Moore (0-2)
February 28*	3:00 PM	Illinois Fighting Illini	49er Softball Complex • Long Beach, CA	Canceled			
March 1*	10:00 AM	Oregon State Beavers	49er Softball Complex • Long Beach, CA	Canceled			
March 1*	1:25 PM	#5 Michigan Wolverines	Mayfair Park • Lakewood, CA	L 1–7	213	Wagner (8-0)	Josi Summers (0-7)
Regular Season
March 4*	3:00 PM	Utah Utes	Utah Softball Stadium • Salt Lake City, UT	Canceled			
March 4*	5:00 PM	Utah Utes	Utah Softball Stadium • Salt Lake City, UT	Canceled			
March 5*	4:00 PM	Utah Utes	Utah Softball Stadium • Salt Lake City, UT	Canceled			
March 5*	6:30 PM	Utah Utes	Utah Softball Stadium • Salt Lake City, UT	Canceled			
Rebel Spring Games
March 8*	1:00 PM	Sacred Heart Pioneers	DiamondPlex • Winter Haven, FL	W 3–2^{8}	50	Josi Summers (1-7)	Carlson
March 8*	3:30 PM	Manhattan Jaspers	DiamondPlex • Winter Haven, FL	W 9–8^{8}	50	Dara Rahm (1-0)	Amy Bright
March 9*	12:00 PM	Siena Saints	DiamondPlex • Winter Haven, FL	W 3–1	N/A	Josi Summers (2-7)	Antonia Edwards (0-2)
March 9*	3:25 PM	Saint Peter's Peacocks	DiamondPlex • Winter Haven, FL	W 9–5	47	Bailey Moore (1-2)	Erica Colon (1-3)
March 11*	10:00 AM	Creighton Bluejays	DiamondPlex • Winter Haven, FL	W 4–1	77	Josi Summers (3-7)	Alexis Cantu (2-3)
March 11*	12:15 PM	Siena Saints	DiamondPlex • Winter Haven, FL	L 4–7	50	J Sandrini (4-2)	Bailey Moore (1-3)
March 12*	7:00 AM	Indiana State Sycamores	DiamondPlex • Winter Haven, FL	Canceled			
March 12*	11:00 AM	Saint Peter's Gamecocks	DiamondPlex • Winter Haven, FL	Canceled			
March 13*	7:00 AM	Albany Great Danes	DiamondPlex • Winter Haven, FL	W 3–0	N/A	Josi Summers (4-7)	B. MacFawn (3-1)
March 13*	9:00 AM	Howard Bison	DiamondPlex • Winter Haven, FL	W 16–2^{6}	N/A	Kailey Christensen (1-2)	Alex Flynn (1-3)
Regular Season
March 18*	1:00 PM	Utah State Aggies	UVU Wolverine Softball Field • Orem, UT	L 1–4	149	Noelle Johnson (8-8)	Josi Summers (4-8)
March 18*	3:30 PM	Utah State Aggies	UVU Wolverine Softball Field • Orem, UT	L 7–8	149	Noelle Johnson (9-8)	Kailey Christensen (1-3)
March 19*	2:00 PM	Weber State Wildcats	Wildcat Softball Field • Ogden, UT	L 4–5	251	K. Colvin (4-3)	Dara Rahm (1-1)
March 19*	4:55 PM	Weber State Wildcats	Wildcat Softball Field • Ogden, UT	L 4–12^{6}	274	J. Ioane (4-1)	Josi Summers (4-9)
March 25*	3:00 PM	Idaho State Bengals	UVU Wolverine Softball Field • Orem, UT	L 8–9	111	Foster (5-4)	Josi Summers (4-10)
March 28	2:00 PM	Cal State Bakersfield Roadrunners	Roadrunner Softball Complex • Bakersfield, CA	W 4–1	82	Josi Summers (5-10)	Kelsie Monroe (7-13)
March 29	2:00 PM	Cal State Bakersfield Roadrunners	Roadrunner Softball Complex • Bakersfield, CA	W 9–4	163	Kelsey Lawton (1-2)	Lyndsay Klimenko (1-6)
March 29	5:00 PM	Cal State Bakersfield Roadrunners	Roadrunner Softball Complex • Bakersfield, CA	W 4–3	128	Josi Summers (6-10)	Kelsie Monroe (7-14)
April 2*	7:10 PM	Utah State Aggies	Gail Miller Field • Provo, UT	L 9–10	110	N. Johnson (13-11)	Bailey Moore (1-4)
April 4	5:00 PM	Seattle Redhawks	Logan Field • Seattle, WA	L 7–8	142	Alyssa Reuble (3-9)	Bailey Moore (1-5)
April 4	7:45 PM	Seattle Redhawks	Logan Field • Seattle, WA	L 3–4	142	Lindsay Davis (5-6)	Josi Summers (6-11)
April 5	12:25 PM	Seattle Redhawks	Logan Field • Seattle, WA	W 13–12	107	Kelsey Lawton (2-2)	Richelle Ashburn (2-6)
April 8*	3:00 PM	BYU Cougars	UVU Wolverine Softball Field • Orem, UT	L 0–9^{5}	405	McKenna Bull (8-9)	Josi Summers (6-12)
April 10*	3:00 PM	Santa Clara Broncos	UVU Wolverine Softball Field • Orem, UT	W 12–4^{6}	155	Kailey Christensen (2-3)	Turner (2-9)
April 11	12:00 PM	Grand Canyon Antelopes	UVU Wolverine Softball Field • Orem, UT	L 3–8	205	Stephanie Pesqueira (11-7)	Josi Summers (6-13)
April 11	2:20 PM	Grand Canyon Antelopes	UVU Wolverine Softball Field • Orem, UT	L 3–8	205	Taylor Nowlin (4-4)	Kelsey Lawton (2-3)
April 12	12:00 PM	Grand Canyon Antelopes	UVU Wolverine Softball Field • Orem, UT	L 4–14^{6}	167	Kiki Sepulveda (2-2)	Kailey Christensen (2-4)
April 14*	2:00 PM	Utah Utes	UVU Wolverine Softball Field • Orem, UT	L 2–6	147	Ramirez (2-3)	Josi Summers (6-14)
April 14*	5:00 PM	Utah Utes	UVU Wolverine Softball Field • Orem, UT	L 1–8	147	Ramirez (3-3)	Bailey Moore (1-6)
April 15*	4:00 PM	Idaho State Bengals	Miller Ranch Stadium • Pocatello, ID	L 7–8	76	Foster (7-4)	Bailey Moore (1-7)
April 18	2:00 PM	UMKC Kangaroos	Missouri 3&2 Complex • Kansas City, MO	W 6–4	43	Josi Summers (7-14)	Cinda Ramos (6-11)
April 18	4:30 PM	UMKC Kangaroos	Missouri 3&2 Complex • Kansas City, MO	L 1–5	87	Katie Kelley (9-14)	Bailey Moore (1-8)
April 19	12:00 PM	UMKC Kangaroos	Missouri 3&2 Complex • Kansas City, MO	L 2–3	59	Katie Kelley (10-14)	Kelsey Lawton (2-4)
April 21*	5:00 PM	Utah Utes	Utah Softball Stadium • Salt Lake City, UT	L 4–14^{5}	273	Nieto (10-11)	Bailey Moore (1-9)
April 21*	7:00 PM	Utah Utes	Utah Softball Stadium • Salt Lake City, UT	L 3–12^{5}	270	Cordova (8-6)	Bailey Moore (1-10)
April 23*	1:00 PM	Southern Utah Thunderbirds	UVU Wolverine Softball Field • Orem, UT	W 5–3	119	Bailey Moore (2-10)	Theurer (5-9)
April 23*	3:30 PM	Southern Utah Thunderbirds	UVU Wolverine Softball Field • Orem, UT	L 3–7^{8}	119	Hart (8-7)	Josi Summers (7-15)
April 25	12:00 PM	New Mexico State Aggies	UVU Wolverine Softball Field • Orem, UT	L 3–6^{9}	137	Celisha Walker (8-6)	Bailey Moore (2-11)
April 25	12:00 PM	New Mexico State Aggies	UVU Wolverine Softball Field • Orem, UT	L 6–15^{5}	137	Makayla McAdams (10-5)	Josi Summers (7-16)
April 26	12:00 PM	New Mexico State Aggies	UVU Wolverine Softball Field • Orem, UT	Canceled			
April 29*	4:00 PM	#1 Oregon Ducks	Howe Field • Corvallis, OR	L 0–8^{5}	312	K. Hovinga (14-1)	Bailey Moore (2-12)
April 29*	5:30 PM	#1 Oregon Ducks	Howe Field • Corvallis, OR	L 4–5	602	C. Hawkins (27-3)	Josi Summers (7-17)
May 6*	5:00 PM	BYU Cougars	Gail Miller Field • Provo, UT	L 2–7	1,065	McKenna Bull (15-9)	Kailey Christensen (2-5)
May 6*	8:00 PM	BYU Cougars	Gail Miller Field • Provo, UT	L 8–11	1,065	Katie Manuma (4-2)	Bailey Moore (2-13)
2014 WAC Tournament
May 8	10:00 AM	Cal State Bakersfield Roadrunners	Logan Field • Seattle, WA	W 4–1	N/A	Josi Summers (8-17)	Lyndsay Klimenko (3-10)
May 9	10:00 AM	New Mexico State Aggies	Logan Field • Seattle, WA	W 4–1	N/A	Josi Summers (9-17)	Makayla McAdams (11-6)
May 9	3:15 PM	UMKC Kangaroos	Logan Field • Seattle, WA	W 1–0	N/A	Josi Summers (10-17)	Katie Kelley (13-17)
May 10	12:00 PM	New Mexico State Aggies	Logan Field • Seattle, WA	W 7–6	205	Bailey Moore (3-13)	Makayla McAdams (11-7)
2014 NCAA Regionals
May 16*	5:00 PM	#1 Oregon Ducks	Howe Field • Corvallis, OR	L 1–12^{5}	1,798	Karissa Hovinga (16-2)	Josi Summers (10-18)
May 17*	3:00 PM	Albany Great Danes	Howe Field • Corvallis, OR	L 3–4	399	Brittany MacFawn	Josi Summers (10-19)
*Non-Conference Game. All times are in Mountain Time Zone.

== TV, Radio, and Streaming Information ==
All Utah Valley home games were streamed live on YouTube. The games at Utah were streamed online via Utah's Pac-12 Digital Channel, and the games at BYU were shown live on BYUtv. The NCAA Regional game vs. Oregon was shown nationwide on Pac-12 Network.
