= 2014 Florida Gators softball team =

American college softball season

2014 Florida Gators softball
- Conference: Southeastern Conference
- East
- Record: 55-12 (15-9 SEC)
- Head coach: Tim Walton
- Assistant coach: Kenny Gajewski, Jennifer Rocha
- Home stadium: Katie Seashole Pressly Softball Stadium

2014 Southeastern Conference softball standings
	Conf.				Overall
Team	W		L	PCT	W		L	PCT
Alabama ‍†‍‍	19	–	5	.792	53	–	13	.803
Tennessee ‍‍‍	17	–	7	.708	46	–	12	.793
Florida ‍‍‍	15	–	9	.625	55	–	12	.821
Georgia ‍‍‍	15	–	9	.625	49	–	15	.766
Missouri ‍‍‍	15	–	9	.625	43	–	18	.705
Kentucky ‍‍‍	13	–	11	.542	50	–	19	.725
LSU ‍‍‍	13	–	11	.542	38	–	24	.613
Auburn ‍‍‍	11	–	13	.458	42	–	19	.689
South Carolina ‍‍‍	11	–	13	.458	36	–	22	.621
Mississippi State ‍‍‍	10	–	14	.417	39	–	21	.650
Texas A&M ‍‍‍	9	–	15	.375	37	–	22	.627
Arkansas ‍‍‍	5	–	19	.208	27	–	28	.491
Ole Miss ‍‍‍	3	–	21	.125	22	–	31	.415
As of Oct 01, 2014; Rankings from Coaches' Poll

The 2014 Florida Gators softball team represented the University of Florida softball program during the 2014 NCAA Division I softball season.

== Roster ==
The 2014 Florida Gators softball team has 2 seniors, 6 juniors, 5 sophomores, and 4 freshmen.

#	Name	Position	Height	B/T	Year	Hometown
1	Aubree Munro	C	5-9		So	Brea, CA
4	Jessica Damico	UT	5-4		Jr	Gary Summit, MO
6	Kathlyn Medina	INF	5-4		Jr	Downey, CA
7	Kelsey Stewart	INF	5-6		So	Wichtia, KS
9	Stephanie Toft	UT	5-5		Sr	Lincoln, CA
12	Taylore Fuller	UT	5-7		So	Trenton, FL
13	Hannah Rogers	RHP	5-10		Sr	Lake Wales, FL
17	Lauren Haeger	RHP/1B	5-11		Jr	Peoria, AZ
19	Chelsea Herndon	UT	5-7		Fr	Carrollton, TX
20	Francesca Martinez	OF	5-5		Jr	Centreville, VA
24	Kirsti Merritt	OF	5-4		So	Lake Panasoffkee, FL
27	Lindsey Spatola	UT	5-6		Fr	Jacksonville, FL
33	Delanie Gourley	LHP	5-4		Fr	Lakeside, CA
49	Taylor Schwarz	1B	5-9		So	Palm Beach Gardens, FL
52	Justine McLean	OF	5-3		Fr	Rancho Cucamonga, CA
55	Briana Little	UT	5-4		Jr	Middleburg, FL
88	Bailey Castro	INF	5-17		Jr	Pembroke Pines, FL
