= 2014 Alabama Crimson Tide softball team =

American college softball season

2014 Alabama Crimson Tide softball

SEC Regular Season Champions

Women's College World Series, 2nd
- Conference: Southeastern Conference
- West
- Record: 53–13 (19–7 SEC)
- Head coach: Patrick Murphy
- Assistant coach: Alyson Habetz
- Pitching coach: Stephanie VanBrakle
- Home stadium: Rhoads Stadium

2014 Southeastern Conference softball standings
	Conf.				Overall
Team	W		L	PCT	W		L	PCT
Alabama ‍†‍‍	19	–	5	.792	53	–	13	.803
Tennessee ‍‍‍	17	–	7	.708	46	–	12	.793
Florida ‍‍‍	15	–	9	.625	55	–	12	.821
Georgia ‍‍‍	15	–	9	.625	49	–	15	.766
Missouri ‍‍‍	15	–	9	.625	43	–	18	.705
Kentucky ‍‍‍	13	–	11	.542	50	–	19	.725
LSU ‍‍‍	13	–	11	.542	38	–	24	.613
Auburn ‍‍‍	11	–	13	.458	42	–	19	.689
South Carolina ‍‍‍	11	–	13	.458	36	–	22	.621
Mississippi State ‍‍‍	10	–	14	.417	39	–	21	.650
Texas A&M ‍‍‍	9	–	15	.375	37	–	22	.627
Arkansas ‍‍‍	5	–	19	.208	27	–	28	.491
Ole Miss ‍‍‍	3	–	21	.125	22	–	31	.415
As of Oct 01, 2014; Rankings from Coaches' Poll

The 2014 Alabama Crimson Tide softball team was an American softball team that represented the University of Alabama for the 2014 NCAA softball season. The Crimson Tide played their home games at Rhoads Stadium. After losing in the 2013 NCAA Super Regionals, the 2014 team looked to make the postseason for the 16th straight year, and the Women's College World Series for ninth time, where they lost against the Florida Gators in the championship game. This season represented the 18th season of softball in the school's history.

== Roster ==
2014 Alabama Crimson Tide roster
Pitchers: 23 Leslie Jury – Junior; 28 Sydney Littlejohn – Freshman; 33 Jackie Traina – Senior; Outfielders: 8 Haylie McCleney – Sophomore; 18 Andrea Hawkins – Sophomore; Utility: 5 Chandler Dare – Freshman; 12 Kallie Case – Sophomore; 17 Jadyn Spencer – Junior; 24 Leona Lafaele – Sophomore	Catchers: 6 Jordan Patterson – Senior; 21 Chaunsey Bell – Junior; 22 Molly Fichtner – Senior; Infielders: 3 Peyton Grantham – Freshman; 9 Marisa Runyon – Freshman; 10 Kaila Hunt – Senior; 15 Danae Hays – Junior; 19 Danielle Richard – Junior; 32 Ryan Iamurri – Senior

2014 Alabama Crimson Tide Softball Roster

== Schedule ==
Date	Time	Opponent	Rank^{#}	Site	Result	Attendance	Winning Pitcher	Losing Pitcher
Troy Subway Invitational
February 7*	2:30 PM	Kennesaw State Owls	#6	Troy Softball Complex • Troy, AL	W 6–0	425	L. Jury	A. Henderson
February 7*	7:30 PM	North Florida Ospreys	#6	Troy Softball Complex • Troy, AL	W 10–1^{(5)}	341	J. Traina	K. Wallace
February 8*	2:30 PM	NW State Lady Demons	#6	Troy Softball Complex • Troy, AL	W 16–0^{(5)}	1,026	L. Jury	S. Cagle
February 8*	7:30 PM	MTSU Blue Raiders	#6	Troy Softball Complex • Troy, AL	W 9–1^{(6)}	364	S. Littlejohn	C. McClure
February 9*	2:30 PM	Troy Trojans	#6	Troy Softball Complex • Troy, AL	W 7–1	2,078	J. Traina	J. Affeldt
Hillenbrand Invitational
February 14*	2:00 PM	Grand Canyon Antelopes	#4	Hillenbrand Stadium • Tucson, AZ	W 13–5	1,008	L. Jury	T. Nowlin
February 14*	7:00 PM	Tennessee State Lady Tigers	#4	Hillenbrand Stadium • Tucson, AZ	W 12–0^{(5)}	453	S. Littlejohn	O. Gamache
February 15*	2:00 pm	New Mexico Lobos	#4	Hillenbrand Stadium • Tucson, AZ	W 9–1^{(5)}	409	S. Littlejohn	T. McPherson
February 15*	7:00 PM	#24 Arizona Wildcats	#4	Hillenbrand Stadium • Tucson, AZ	L 0–3	2,674	E. Piñon	J. Traina
February 16*	12:00 PM	#24 Arizona Wildcats	#4	Hillenbrand Stadium • Tucson, AZ	L 0–8^{(5)}	2,674	S. Babcock	L. Jury
Easton Bama Bash
February 21*	4:00 PM	Virginia Tech Hokies	#9	Rhoads Stadium • Tuscaloosa, AL	W 8–0^{(5)}	–	L. Jury	M. Tyler
February 21*	6:00 PM	UCF Knights	#9	Rhoads Stadium • Tuscaloosa, AL	W 8–3	2,633	J. Traina	M. Audas
February 22*	1:30 PM	Virginia Tech Hokies	#9	Rhoads Stadium • Tuscaloosa, AL	W 14–5	–	S. Littlejohn	K. Heinz
February 22*	4:00 PM	UCF Knights	#9	Rhoads Stadium • Tuscaloosa, AL	W 1–0	3,033	L. Jury	M. Audas
February 23*	1:30 PM	McNeese State Cowgirls	#9	Rhoads Stadium • Tuscaloosa, AL	L 3–5	2,567	J. Allred	J. Traina
February 25*	6:00 PM	UAB Blazers	#11	UAB Softball Field • Birmingham, AL	W 5–0	745	L. Jury	L. Streetman
Easton Crimson Classic
February 28*	4:00 PM	Purdue Boilermakers	#11	Rhoads Stadium • Tuscaloosa, AL	W 7–3		L. Jury	L. Moore
February 28*	6:00 PM	Houston Cougars	#11	Rhoads Stadium • Tuscaloosa, AL	W 11–4	2,268	J. Traina	S. Groholski
March 1*	1:30 PM	#9 Florida State Seminoles	#11	Rhoads Stadium • Tuscaloosa, AL	W 1–0	–	J. Traina	L. Waldrop
March 1*	4:00 PM	Houston Cougars	#11	Rhoads Stadium • Tuscaloosa, AL	W 12–1^{(5)}	2,988	L. Jury	J. Shrum
March 2*	1:30 PM	#9 Florida State Seminoles	#11	Rhoads Stadium • Tuscaloosa, AL	L 1–5	2,822	L. Waldrop	L. Jury
March 4*	6:00 PM	Samford Bulldogs	#11	Samford Softball Field • Homewood, AL	Canceled			
March 7	6:30 PM	South Carolina Gamecocks	#11	Rhoads Stadium • Tuscaloosa, AL	W 14–4^{(6)}	2,752	J. Traina	N. Blue
March 8	2:00 PM	South Carolina Gamecocks	#11	Rhoads Stadium • Tuscaloosa, AL	W 10–5	2,866	S. Littlejohn	J. Sarratt
March 9	1:30 PM	South Carolina Gamecocks	#11	Rhoads Stadium • Tuscaloosa, AL	W 4–3	2,665	J. Traina	J. Sarratt
March 11*	6:00 PM	MSVS Delta Devilettes	#10	Rhoads Stadium • Tuscaloosa, AL	W 12–0^{(5)}	2,403	L. Jury	T. Patterson
March 14	6:00 PM	Ole Miss Rebels	#10	Ole Miss Softball Complex • Oxford, MS	W 10–2	572	J. Traina	C. Hummel
March 15	2:00 PM	Ole Miss Rebels	#10	Ole Miss Softball Complex • Oxford, MS	W 7–0	500	L. Jury	E. Gaitan
March 16	1:00 PM	Ole Miss Rebels	#10	Ole Miss Softball Complex • Oxford, MS	W 9–2	376	J. Traina	C. Hummel
March 19*	6:00 PM	Georgia State Panthers	#9	Rhoads Stadium • Tuscaloosa, AL	W 3–1	2,571	L. Jury	E. Milton
March 21	5:05 PM	#1 Florida Gators	#9	Pressly Stadium • Gainesville, FL	W 4–2	2,036	J. Traina	D. Gourley
March 22	12:00 PM	#1 Florida Gators	#9	Pressly Stadium • Gainesville, FL	L 1–7	CSS	H. Rogers	L. Jury
March 23	12:05 PM	#1 Florida Gators	#9	Pressly Stadium • Gainesville, FL	W 7–0	1,783	J. Traina	H. Rogers
March 25*	6:00 PM	Jacksonville Dolphins	#7	JU Softball Complex • Jacksonville, FL	W 6–2	568	L. Jury	C. Gomez
March 28	6:30 PM	LSU Lady Tigers	#7	Rhoads Stadium • Tuscaloosa, AL	W 9–1^{(6)}	2,952	J. Traina	B. Corbello
March 29	2:00 PM	LSU Lady Tigers	#7	Rhoads Stadium • Tuscaloosa, AL	W 2–1	3,940	S. Littlejohn	A. Czechner
March 30	1:00 PM	LSU Lady Tigers	#7	Rhoads Stadium • Tuscaloosa, AL	W 5–1	3,556	J. Traina	A. Czechner
April 2*	6:00 PM	#11 South Alabama Jaguars	#4	Rhoads Stadium • Tuscaloosa, AL	W 3–0	2,938	S. Littlejohn	F. Beard
April 4	8:00 PM	Arkansas Razorbacks	#4	Rhoads Stadium • Tuscaloosa, AL	W 8–0^{(5)}	2,967	J. Traina	S. Wright
April 5	2:00 PM	Arkansas Razorbacks	#4	Rhoads Stadium • Tuscaloosa, AL	W 12–1^{(5)}	–	L. Jury	G. Moll
April 6	2:00 PM	Arkansas Razorbacks	#4	Rhoads Stadium • Tuscaloosa, AL	W 4–3	3,486	J. Traina	K. Fagan
April 9*	6:00 PM	UAB Blazers	#3	Rhoads Stadium • Tuscaloosa, AL	W 4–3	2,535	S. Littlejohn	L. Campbell
April 11	5:00 PM	Mississippi State Bulldogs	#3	MS State Softball Stadium • Starkville, MS	W 5–1	1,009	J. Traina	A. Silkwood
April 12	12:00 PM	Mississippi State Bulldogs	#3	MS State Softball Stadium • Starkville, MS	L 2–4	1,577	A. Owen	L. Jury
April 13	1:00 PM	Mississippi State Bulldogs	#3	MS State Softball Stadium • Starkville, MS	L 3–4^{(10)}	998	A. Silkwood	S. Littlejohn
April 16*	6:30 PM	#23 Auburn Tigers	#7	Lagoon Park • Montgomery, AL	L 2–6	3,200	M. Harper	L. Jury
April 18*	2:30 PM	Georgia Southern Eagles	#7	Anderson Stadium • Chapel Hill, NC	W 6–4	1,863	J. Traina	S. Purvis
April 18*	5:00 PM	North Carolina Tar Heels	#7	Anderson Stadium • Chapel Hill, NC	W 4–3	2,048	L. Jury	L. Spingola
April 19*	11:00 AM	North Carolina Tar Heels	#7	Anderson Stadium • Chapel Hill, NC	Canceled			
April 22*	6:00 PM	Southern Miss Golden Eagles	#7	S. Miss Softball Complex • Hattiesburg, MS	W 12–0	902	S. Littlejohn	S. Robles
April 24	7:00 PM	#13 Georgia Bulldogs	#7	Rhoads Stadium • Tuscaloosa, AL	W 4–2	2,604	J. Traina	C. Wilkinson
April 25	12:00 PM	#13 Georgia Bulldogs	#7	Rhoads Stadium • Tuscaloosa, AL	L 2–10^{(6)}	3,287	G. Glasco	L. Jury
April 26	11:00 AM	#13 Georgia Bulldogs	#7	Rhoads Stadium • Tuscaloosa, AL	W 4–1	3,696	J. Traina	C. Wilkinson
May 1	7:00 PM	#13 Missouri Tigers	#6	University Field • Columbia, MO	L 6–8	1,489	T. Finucane	J. Traina
May 2	6:30 PM	#13 Missouri Tigers	#6	University Field • Columbia, MO	W 3–1	2,015	S. Littlejohn	C. Stangel
May 3	1:00 PM	#13 Missouri Tigers	#6	University Field • Columbia, MO	W 2–0	2,182	L. Jury	C. Stangel
SEC Tournament
May 8	5:30 PM	#22 Auburn Tigers	#6	Beckham Field • Columbia, SC	W 8–4	1,347	J. Traina	M. Harper
May 8	6:00 PM	#11 Georgia Bulldogs	#6	Beckham Field • Columbia, SC	L 3–5	1,327	C. Wilkinson	S. Littlejohn
NCAA Tuscaloosa Regional
May 16	6:00 PM	SIU Edwardsville Cougars	#5	Rhoads Stadium • Tuscaloosa, AL	W 13–3^{(5)}	1,987	L. Jury	H. Chambers
May 17	1:00 PM	#24 USC Upstate Spartans	#5	Rhoads Stadium • Tuscaloosa, AL	W 7–1	1,987	J. Traina	L. Shubert
May 18	2:00 PM	#22 South Alabama Jaguars	#5	Rhoads Stadium • Tuscaloosa, AL	W 3–0	2,105	J. Traina	F. Beard
NCAA Tuscaloosa Super Regional
May 22	8:00 PM	#19 Nebraska Cornhuskers	#5	Rhoads Stadium • Tuscaloosa, AL	W 6–5^{(12)}	2,100	S. Littlejohn	E. Lockman
May 23	5:00 PM	#19 Nebraska Cornhuskers	#5	Rhoads Stadium • Tuscaloosa, AL	W 2–1	2,530	J. Traina	T. Edwards
Women's College World Series
May 29	8:30 PM	#12 Oklahoma Sooners	#5	ASA Hall of Fame Stadium • Oklahoma City, OK	W 6–2	8,818	J. Traina	K. Stevens
May 30	8:30 PM	#15 Kentucky Wildcats	#5	ASA Hall of Fame Stadium • Oklahoma City, OK	W 2–0	9,062	J. Traina	K. Nunley
June 1	2:30 PM	#1 Oregon Ducks	#5	ASA Hall of Fame Stadium • Oklahoma City, OK	W 2–0	8,910	J. Traina	C. Hawkins
June 2	7:00 PM	#6 Florida Gators	#5	ASA Hall of Fame Stadium • Oklahoma City, OK	L 5–0			
June 3	7:00 PM	#6 Florida Gators	#5	ASA Hall of Fame Stadium • Oklahoma City, OK	L 6–3			
*Non-Conference Game. ^{#}Rankings from NFCA released prior to game.All times are in Central Time Zone.

== Ranking movement ==
Poll	Pre	Wk 1	Wk 2	Wk 3	Wk 4	Wk 5	Wk 6	Wk 7	Wk 8	Wk 9	Wk 10	Wk 11	Wk 12	Wk 13	Wk 14	Final
NFCA	6	4	9	11	11	10	9	7	4	3	7	7	6	6	5	2
USA Softball	6	6	7	10	11	9	7	5	4	2	6	7	5	5	5	

== See also ==
- 2014 Alabama Crimson Tide baseball team
