= Erin Jones-Wesley =

American film producer, former softball player

Erin Jones-Wesley is an American film producer and former softball player from Rancho Cucamonga, California.

Jones-Wesley has worked as an on-camera color analyst for Big West Conference softball on ESPN.

A former NCAA Division I softball player, Jones-Wesley played for Long Beach State University where she achieved several record performances as a pitcher, and maintains the record as the most winning pitcher in the school's history.

After her student-athlete career she championed the underserved people of Los Angeles through philanthropic work at the Major League Baseball Urban Youth Academy in Compton in 2014 and co-founded the Los Angeles-based sports philanthropy, Club 42 LA, with John Branca, co-executor of the Michael Jackson estate, Johnny Buc Lockwood, and Melissa Bowden.

== Softball career ==
Jones-Wesley currently holds the career-pitching record for wins (84), strikeouts (728), and appearances (148) for the Long Beach State Women's Softball Program.

At Long Beach State Jones-Wesley was one of the first Black-American starting pitchers for the women's softball team from 2010 to 2014. She also played professionally in the European World Cup for the Hørsholm Barracudas where she had a record of 4–2 with one no-hitter, 78 strikeouts and an ERA of 1.70.

In her senior season at Long Beach State, Jones-Wesley became the only Long Beach State pitcher to attain four 20-win seasons. Through her college career Jones-Wesley clocked top speeds of 68 mph and threw three no-hitters.

Along with school records, Jones-Wesley holds the Big West Conference record for achieving the Pitcher of the Week award 15 times during her career, and became only the seventh player in conference history to make First Team All-Big West four consecutive times. Jones-Wesley is also in the top five in the Big West Conference record books for wins, strikeouts, and appearances.

== Education ==
Erin is an alum of the prestigious American Film Institute Conservatory, where she graduated as a Producing Fellow and earned her MFA. She produced the thesis film, "Til Life Do Us Part.

== Miss Santa Monica USA 2019 ==
In 2019, Erin was appointed as Miss Santa Monica USA by the Miss Universe Organization and finished 2nd Runner Up in the Miss California USA.
