= 2016 Big Sky Conference softball tournament =

- Teams: 6
- Format: Double-elimination tournament
- Finals site: Wildcat Softball Field; Ogden, UT
- Television: Watch Big Sky

The 2016 Big Sky Conference softball tournament was held at Wildcat Softball Field on the campus of the Weber State University in Ogden, UT from May 12 through May 14, 2016. The tournament winner earned the Big Sky Conference's automatic bid to the 2016 NCAA Division I softball tournament. This is the first time the tournament featured six teams. All games were streamed online by Watch Big Sky with Jon Oglesby on the call.

== Tournament ==
Upper round 1
4	Montana	10
5	Southern Utah	6
3	Idaho State	12
6	Portland State	0^{(5)}
Lower round 1
4	Montana	14
6	Portland State	8
5	Southern Utah	0
2	Sacramento State	17^{(5)}

Upper round 2
1	Weber State	10
4	Montana	2^{(6)}
2	Sacramento State	1
3	Idaho State	11^{(5)}
Lower round 2
4	Montana	4
2	Sacramento State	10

Upper final
1	Weber State	6
3	Idaho State	0
Lower final
3	Idaho State	7
2	Sacramento State	4

Final
1	Weber State	4
3	Idaho State	2

- All times listed are Mountain Daylight Time.
