= 2014 BYU Cougars softball team =

American college softball season

2014 BYU Cougars softball

2014 WCC Champions

NCAA Regionals
- Conference: West Coast Conference
- Record: 34–23 (12–2 WCC)
- Head coach: Gordon Eakin (12th season)
- Assistant coaches: Pete Meredith (1st season); Kristin Delahoussaye (1st season)
- Home stadium: Gail Miller Field

The 2014 BYU Cougars softball team represented Brigham Young University in the 2014 NCAA Division I softball season. Gordon Eakin entered the year as head coach of the Cougars for a 12th consecutive season. The Cougars entered 2014 being in their fourth conference in four years time. In 2011 the Cougars were part of the Mountain West Conference. In 2012, they joined the Western Athletic Conference for softball only. In 2013, they were part of the Pacific Coast Softball Conference, and in 2014 they joined the West Coast Conference. The WCC was in its first season hosting softball after Pacific joined the conference, giving them the six members needed to host softball for the conference. The Cougars had won their last 3 conference championships and entered 2014 as the favorites in the WCC. The Cougars won the conference championship with a sweep of Saint Mary's on April 9 and qualified for their tenth consecutive NCAA softball tournament. After upsetting Northwestern on Thursday, the Cougars lost twice on Friday to be eliminated from the Eugene region with a 34–23 overall record.

== 2014 roster ==
2014 BYU Cougars Roster
Pitchers: 3 Carly Duckworth – senior; 5 McKenna Bull – freshman; 8 Tori Almond – senior; 31 Katie Manuma – senior; 33 Ashley Thompson – freshman; Catchers: 0 Mercedes O'Connor – freshman; 12 Megan Arnold – junior; 25 Coco Tauali'i – sophomore; 34 Sydney Broderick – freshman	Infielders: 2 Gordy Bravo – sophomore; 4 Ashlee Robinson – senior; 9 Lauren Bell – freshman; 10 Karli Lehr – freshman; 12 Megan Arnold – junior; 24 Jenna Goar – senior; 25 Coco Tauali'i – sophomore; 31 Katie Manuma – senior; 33 Ashley Thompson – freshman	Outfielders: 1 Lacey Millettt-Hofstedt – junior; 2 Gordo Bravo – sophomore; 3 Carly Duckworth – senior; 13 McKenzie St. Clair – freshman; 27 Brittany Call – freshman; 34 Sydney Broderick – freshman

== Coaching staff ==
BYU entered the 2014 season with two new assistants. At the end of the 2013 season assistant coach Vaughn Alvey announced his retirement after 11 seasons with the Cougars. Meanwhile, Ianeta Le'i left BYU to pursue other interests after 7 seasons with the Cougars. To replace the departing assistants, Gordon Eakin would interview and hire former Cougar alum Kristin Delahoussaye, who had been serving as an assistant softball and strength coach at Dixie State College and Salt Lake City Pitching Academy head coach Peter Meredith.

== Schedule ==
Date	Time	Opponent	Site	Result	Attendance	Winning Pitcher	Losing Pitcher
Red Desert Classic
February 6*	2:00 PM	Weber State Wildcats	The Canyons Complex • St. George, UT	L 3–4	250	Kylee Colvin (1-0)	McKenna Bull (0-1)
February 6*	4:00 PM	Southern Utah Thunderbirds	The Canyons Complex • St. George, UT	W 10–2^{5}	250	Ashley Thompson (1-0)	Jordan Theurer (0-1)
February 7*	11:00 AM	Nevada Wolfpack	The Canyons Complex • St. George, UT	L 9–10	220	McKenna Isenberg (1-0)	Katie Manuma (0-1)
February 7*	1:55 PM	East Carolina Pirates	The Canyons Complex • St. George, UT	W 13–5^{6}	220	Ashley Thompson (2-0)	Lydia Ritchie (0-1)
February 8*	11:00 AM	Texas–Arlington Mavericks	The Canyons Complex • St. George, UT	L 2–3	175	Shannon Carrico (1-0)	McKenna Bull (0-2)
Easton Desert Classic
February 13*	7:50 PM	Seattle Redhawks	Eller Media Stadium • Las Vegas, NV	W 14-8	386	Katie Manuma (1-1)	Alyssa Reuble (0-2)
February 14*	2:30 PM	Portland State Vikings	Stephanie Lynn Craig Softball Complex • Henderson, NV	W 5-4	140	Katie Manuma (2-1)	Karyn Wright (0-3)
February 14*	5:15 PM	Chattanooga Mocs	Stephanie Lynn Craig Softball Complex • Henderson, NV	L 0–8^{5}	140	Liana Rodrigues (1-0)	McKenna Bull (0-3)
February 15*	12:25 PM	Nevada Wolfpack	Stephanie Lynn Craig Softball Complex • Henderson, NV	L 10–20	168	Megan Dortch (4-0)	Katie Manuma (2-2)
February 15*	3:40 PM	#22 Minnesota Golden Gophers	Stephanie Lynn Craig Softball Complex • Henderson, NV	L 6–13	85	Sara Moulton (5-0)	Ashley Thompson (2-1)
Mary Nutter Classic
February 20*	11:00 AM	Virginia Cavaliers	Big League Dreams Complex • Cathedral City, CA	W 9–0^{5}	44	McKenna Bull (1-3)	Aimee Chapdelaine (1-8)
February 20*	1:30 PM	#24 Notre Dame Fighting Irish	Big League Dreams Complex • Cathedral City, CA	L 0–6	115	Laura Winter (4-1)	Ashley Thompson (2-2)
February 21*	11:30 AM	Oklahoma State Cowgirls	Big League Dreams Complex • Cathedral City, CA	L 5–6^{8}	100	Simone Freeman (5-2)	McKenna Bull (1-4)
February 21*	5:30 PM	Fordham Rams	Big League Dreams Complex • Cathedral City, CA	W 5–2	240	Ashley Thompson (3-2)	Michele Daubman (3-5)
February 22*	9:00 PM	#2 Washington Huskies	Big League Dreams Complex • Cathedral City, CA	L 0–8^{5}	N/A	Bryana Walker (8-1)	McKenna Bull (1-5)
San Diego Classic
February 27*	3:00 PM	#2 Tennessee Lady Volunteers	SDSU Softball Stadium • San Diego, CA	W 6–3	N/A	McKenna Bull (2-5)	Cheyanne Tarango (1-1)
February 27*	6:15 PM	San Diego State Aztecs	SDSU Softball Stadium • San Diego, CA	L 0–2	330	Danielle O'Toole (10-2)	Tori Almond (0-1)
February 28*	3:00 PM	Fresno State Bulldogs	SDSU Softball Stadium • San Diego, CA	Canceled			
February 28*	5:30 PM	Ole Miss Rebels	SDSU Softball Stadium • San Diego, CA	Canceled			
March 1*	3:00 PM	Colorado State Rams	SDSU Softball Stadium • San Diego, CA	Canceled			
Stanford Louisville Slugger Classic
March 6*	6:00 PM	#17 Stanford Cardinal	Boyd & Jill Smith Family Stadium • Stanford, CA	L 3–5	302	Madi Schreyer (15-3)	Tori Almond (0-2)
March 7*	11:00 AM	Portland State Vikings	Boyd & Jill Smith Family Stadium • Stanford, CA	W 4–3^{8}	132	Tori Almond (1-2)	Karyn Wright (1-5)
March 7*	1:35 PM	North Dakota State Bison	Boyd & Jill Smith Family Stadium • Stanford, CA	L 0–4	156	Katie Thun (2-1)	Ashley Thompson (3-3)
March 8*	11:00 AM	North Dakota State Bison	Boyd & Jill Smith Family Stadium • Stanford, CA	W 6–3	205	Tori Almond (2-2)	Krista Menke (8-3)
March 8*	1:15 PM	#17 Stanford Cardinal	Boyd & Jill Smith Family Stadium • Stanford, CA	L 5–7	403	Madi Schreyer (16-4)	McKenna Bull (2-6)
Pepsi Rainbow Wahine Classic
March 12*	5:00 PM	James Madison Dukes	Rainbow Wahine Softball Stadium • Honolulu, HI	L 1–3	N/A	Heather Kiefer (8-4)	Tori Almond (2-3)
March 12*	7:00 PM	Oregon Ducks	Rainbow Wahine Softball Stadium • Honolulu, HI	L 2–3	N/A	Cheridan Hawkins (11-2)	Ashley Thompson (3-4)
March 13*	11:00 PM	Hawaii Rainbow Wahine	Rainbow Wahine Softball Stadium • Honolulu, HI	W 10–6	514	McKenna Bull (3-6)	Loie Kesterson (6-4)
March 14*	5:30 PM	Valparaiso Crusaders	Rainbow Wahine Softball Stadium • Honolulu, HI	L 4–6	N/A	Taylor Weissenhofer (3-5)	McKenna Bull (3-7)
March 15*	5:00 PM	James Madison Dukes	Rainbow Wahine Softball Stadium • Honolulu, HI	L 1–3	N/A	Heather Kiefer (9-5)	Tori Almond (2-4)
Deseret First Duel
March 20*	6:00 PM	Utah Utes	Utah Softball Stadium • Salt Lake City, UT	L 0–1^{9}	527	Kayce Nieto (6-7)	Tori Almond (2-5)
Regular Season
March 25*	6:00 PM	#2 Oregon Ducks	Gail Miller Field • Provo, UT	W 6–5	200	McKenna Bull (4-7)	Jasmine Smithson-Willett (3-1)
March 28*	6:00 PM	Idaho State Bengals	Gail Miller Field • Provo, UT	L 4–6	303	Haley Douglas (12-7)	McKenna Bull (4-8)
March 29*	1:00 PM	Idaho State Bengals	Gail Miller Field • Provo, UT	W 11–10	321	Katie Manuma (3-2)	Jessica Tolmie (2-2)
March 29*	4:15 PM	Idaho State Bengals	Gail Miller Field • Provo, UT	W 9–2	321	McKenna Bull (5-8)	Haley Douglas (12-8)
April 2*	4:00 PM	Utah State Aggies	Gail Miller Field • Provo, UT	W 5–4^{8}	303	McKenna Bull (6-8)	Noelle Johnson (12-11)
April 4	6:00 PM	San Diego Toreros	USD Softball Complex • San Diego, CA	L 0–4	175	Cassidy Coleman (7-8)	McKenna Bull (6-9)
April 5	12:45 PM	San Diego Toreros	USD Softball Complex • San Diego, CA	W 2–1	156	Tori Almond (3-5)	Jenny Lahitte (7-8)
April 5	3:15 PM	San Diego Toreros	USD Softball Complex • San Diego, CA	W 4–3	168	McKenna Bull (7-9)	Cassidy Coleman (7-9)
April 8*	3:00 PM	Utah Valley Wolverines	UVU Wolverine Softball Field • Orem, UT	W 9–0^{5}	405	McKenna Bull (8-9)	Josi Summers (6-12)
April 11	6:00 PM	Santa Clara Broncos	Gail Miller Field • Provo, UT	W 3–2	578	McKenna Bull (9-9)	Ciara Gonzales (2-9)
April 12	12:00 PM	Santa Clara Broncos	Gail Miller Field • Provo, UT	L 1–2	367	Ciara Gonzales (3-9)	Tori Almond (3-6)
April 12	2:10 PM	Santa Clara Broncos	Gail Miller Field • Provo, UT	W 5–0	367	McKenna Bull (10-9)	Ciara Gonzales (3-10)
April 15*	4:00 PM	Southern Utah Thunderbirds	Gail Miller Field • Provo, UT	W 10–2^{5}	241	McKenna Bull (11-9)	Jordan Theurer (5-7)
April 15*	6:20 PM	Southern Utah Thunderbirds	Gail Miller Field • Provo, UT	W 8–2	241	Tori Almond (4-6)	Katie Greenburg (3-5)
April 18*	5:00 PM	Weber State Wildcats	Gail Miller Field • Provo, UT	W 7–3	N/A	Tori Almond (5-6)	McCauley Flint (9-7)
April 25	3:30 PM	Loyola Marymount Lions	Gail Miller Field • Provo, UT	W 13–5^{6}	113	McKenna Bull (12-9)	Rachael Farrington (6-10)
April 25	6:30 PM	Loyola Marymount Lions	Gail Miller Field • Provo, UT	W 8–1	113	Tori Almond (6-6)	Stephanie Crist (1-11)
April 26	12:00 PM	Loyola Marymount Lions	Gail Miller Field • Provo, UT	Canceled			
April 30*	6:30 PM	Weber State Wildcats	Wildcat Softball Field • Ogden, UT	W 6–1	378	McKenna Bull (13-9)	Jasmine Ioane (5-7)
May 2	5:00 PM	Pacific Tigers	Bill Simoni Field • Stockton, CA	W 3–2	300	Tori Almond (7-6)	Tori Shephard (7-13)
May 2	7:45 PM	Pacific Tigers	Bill Simoni Field • Stockton, CA	W 8–0^{5}	300	McKenna Bull (14-9)	Dani Bonnet (12-7)
May 3	1:00 PM	Pacific Tigers	Bill Simoni Field • Stockton, CA	W 9–6	295	Tori Almond (8-6)	Tori Shephard (7-14)
May 6*	5:00 PM	Utah Valley Wolverines	Gail Miller Field • Provo, UT	W 7–2	1,065	McKenna Bull (15-9)	Kailey Christensen (2-5)
May 6*	8:00 PM	Utah Valley Wolverines	Gail Miller Field • Provo, UT	W 11–8	1,065	Katie Manuma (4-2)	Bailey Moore (2-13)
May 9	5:00 PM	Saint Mary's Gaels	Gail Miller Field • Provo, UT	W 14–2^{5}	1,112	Tori Almond (9-6)	Lujane Mussadi (13-14)
May 9	7:00 PM	Saint Mary's Gaels	Gail Miller Field • Provo, UT	W 5–1	1,112	McKenna Bull (16-9)	Sarah Lira (7-8)
May 10	12:00 PM	Saint Mary's Gaels	Gail Miller Field • Provo, UT	W 3–0	1,169	Tori Almond (10-6)	Lujane Mussadi (13-15)
2014 NCAA Regionals
May 15*	5:30 PM	Northwestern Wildcats	Husky Softball Stadium • Seattle, WA	W 7–2	1,066	Tori Almond (11-6)	Kristen Wood (18-10)
May 16*	2:00 PM	#12 Washington Huskies	Husky Softball Stadium • Seattle, WA	L 0–9^{5}	790	Bryana Walker (19-8)	Tori Almond (11-7)
May 16*	6:30 PM	Northwestern Wildcats	Husky Softball Stadium • Seattle, WA	L 3–8	790	Sammy Albanese	Tori Almond (11-8)
*Non-Conference Game. All times are in Mountain Time Zone.

== TV, Radio, and Streaming Information ==
During the 2014 season BYUtv broadcast 8 home games: Apr. 11 & 12 (DH) vs. Santa Clara, Apr. 18 vs. Weber State, Apr. 25 (DH) vs. Loyola Marymount, and May 9 (DH) vs. Saint Mary's. Spencer Linton acted as the play-by-play man for these games while former Cougar softball coach Vaughn Alvey provided the analysis.

TheW.tv streamed 11 home games: Mar. 25 vs. Oregon, Mar. 28 & 29 (DH) vs. Idaho State, Apr. 2 vs. Utah State, Apr. 15 (DH) vs. Southern Utah, Apr. 26 vs. Loyola Marymount, May 6 (DH) vs. Utah Valley, and May 10 vs. Saint Mary's. Robbie Bullough provided play-by-play for 9 games while Ty Brandenburg provided play-by-play for the Utah Valley double header. Bailey Higgins provided analysis for all but the Oregon game.

The Mar. 20 game at Utah was broadcast by Pac-12 Network with Krista Blunk providing play-by-play and Teri Goldberg providing the analysis.

BYU Radio would provide a game broadcast for two road games during the season. The Apr. 8 game at Utah Valley and the Apr. 30 game at Weber State would have a radio only broadcast with Ty Brandenburg providing the call. They would also simulcast all BYUtv games.

Road games at Pacific (Pacific Portal), at San Diego State (MW Network), at Weber State (Watch Big Sky), and at Utah Valley (YouTube) had streams available through the opponents athletic websites. All games during the Rainbow Wahine Classic would stream on BigWest.tv.

The NCAA Regional games vs. Northwestern had an audio broadcast online via NUsports.com with Doug Meffley providing the call. Mike Brown provided the NCAA Regional game vs. Washington on Gohuskies.com.
