= 2014 Auburn Tigers softball team =

American college softball season

2014 Auburn Tigers softball
- Conference: Southeastern Conference
- West
- Record: 42–19–1 (11–13 SEC)
- Head coach: Clint Myers
- Assistant coach: Scott Woodard, Casey Myers, & Corey Myers
- Pitching coach: Corey Myers
- Home stadium: Jane B. Moore Field

2014 Southeastern Conference softball standings
	Conf.				Overall
Team	W		L	PCT	W		L	PCT
Alabama ‍†‍‍	19	–	5	.792	53	–	13	.803
Tennessee ‍‍‍	17	–	7	.708	46	–	12	.793
Florida ‍‍‍	15	–	9	.625	55	–	12	.821
Georgia ‍‍‍	15	–	9	.625	49	–	15	.766
Missouri ‍‍‍	15	–	9	.625	43	–	18	.705
Kentucky ‍‍‍	13	–	11	.542	50	–	19	.725
LSU ‍‍‍	13	–	11	.542	38	–	24	.613
Auburn ‍‍‍	11	–	13	.458	42	–	19	.689
South Carolina ‍‍‍	11	–	13	.458	36	–	22	.621
Mississippi State ‍‍‍	10	–	14	.417	39	–	21	.650
Texas A&M ‍‍‍	9	–	15	.375	37	–	22	.627
Arkansas ‍‍‍	5	–	19	.208	27	–	28	.491
Ole Miss ‍‍‍	3	–	21	.125	22	–	31	.415
As of Oct 01, 2014; Rankings from Coaches' Poll

The 2014 Auburn Tigers softball team was an American softball team that represented the Auburn University for the 2014 NCAA softball season. This was Clint Myers first season as the Auburn Tigers softball head coach. The Auburn Tigers played their home games at Jane B. Moore Field.

Auburn made it back to the Regionals, before falling to Minnesota in the final game of Regionals.

== Roster ==
2014 Auburn Tigers Softball roster
Pitchers: 6 Hilary Mavromat – senior; 22 Marcy Harper – sophomore; 23 Lexi Davis – sophomore; Outfielders: 1 Tiffany Howard – sophomore; 3 Morgan Estell – junior; 7 Kristyn Richards – senior; 17 Branndi Melero – junior; 18 Jordan Rocker – sophomore; 27 Victoria Draper – freshman; 77 Sydne Waldrop – freshman	Catchers: 9 Austyn West – sophomore; 10 Anna Gibbs – sophomore; 12 Maria Mitchell – sophomore; 25 McKenzie Kilpatrick – junior; Infielders: 2 Haley Fagan - Sophomore (redshirted for season); 4 Madi Gipson – freshman; 5 Emily Carosone – sophomore; 8 Jade Rhodes – sophomore; 11 Maris Medina – senior; 13 Kasey Cooper – freshman; 14 Kelsey Bogaards – sophomore; 44 Jenna Abbott – freshman; 99 Ashley Leon – freshman

2014 Auburn Tigers Softball Roster

== Schedule ==
Date	Time	Opponent	Venue	Result	Record
February 6	3:00 PM	Troy	Troy Softball Complex • Troy, AL	5-5 (5)	0-0-1 (0-0)
February 7	6:00 PM	North Dakota State	Jane B. Moore Field • Auburn, AL	11-3 (6)	1-0-1 (0-0)
February 8	3:30 PM	Morehead State	Jane B. Moore Field • Auburn, AL	12-0 (5)	2-0-1 (0-0)
February 8	5:30 PM	Louisiana-Monroe	Jane B. Moore Field • Auburn, AL	9-2	3-0-1 (0-0)
February 9	11:00 AM	Notre Dame	Jane B. Moore Field • Auburn, AL	2-3 (8)	3-1-1 (0-0)
February 9	1:00 PM	Tennessee Tech	Jane B. Moore Field • Auburn, AL	8-4	4-1-1 (0-0)
February 14	3:00 PM	Marshall	Jane B. Moore Field • Auburn, AL	19-5 (5)	5-1-1 (0-0)
February 14	5:30 PM	Loyola	Jane B. Moore Field • Auburn, AL	11-2 (5)	6-1-1 (0-0)
February 15	3:30 PM	Nebraska Omaha	Jane B. Moore Field • Auburn, AL	4-2	7-1-1 (0-0)
February 15	5:30 PM	Western Illinois	Jane B. Moore Field • Auburn, AL	6-0	8-1-1 (0-0)
February 16	3:00 PM	Winthrop	Jane B. Moore Field • Auburn, AL	16-0 (5)	9-1-1 (0-0)
February 21	3:30 PM	Jacksonville State	Jane B. Moore Field • Auburn, AL	6-5 (9)	10-1-1 (0-0)
February 21	6:00 PM	Samford	Jane B. Moore Field • Auburn, AL	3-0	11-1-1 (0-0)
February 22	3:30 PM	Jacksonville State	Jane B. Moore Field • Auburn, AL	13-3 (5)	10-1-1 (0-0)
February 23	11:30 AM	Purdue	Jane B. Moore Field • Auburn, AL	8-0 (5)	11-1-1 (0-0)
February 26	9:00 AM	Florida State	Jane B. Moore Field • Auburn, AL	4-5	11-2-1 (0-0)
February 28	11:00 AM	Oregon	Diamond 9 Citrus Classic • Kissimmee, FL	0-3	11-3-1 (0-0)
February 28	1:15 PM	Illinois State	Diamond 9 Citrus Classic • Kissimmee, FL	3-2	12-3-1 (0-0)
March 1	1:15 PM	Syracuse	Diamond 9 Citrus Classic • Kissimmee, FL	10-1	12-3-1 (0-0)
March 1	3:30 PM	Maryland	Diamond 9 Citrus Classic • Kissimmee, FL	16-3 (5)	13-3-1 (0-0)
March 2	10:00 AM	Radford	Diamond 9 Citrus Classic • Kissimmee, FL	8-0 (5)	14-3-1 (0-0)
March 7	6:00 PM	LSU	Jane B. Moore Field • Auburn, AL	1-4	14-4-1 (0-1)
March 8	1:00 PM	LSU	Jane B. Moore Field • Auburn, AL	6-4	15-4-1 (1-1)
March 9	1:00 PM	LSU	Jane B. Moore Field • Auburn, AL	7-0	16-4-1 (2-1)
March 12	6:00 PM	Troy	Jane B. Moore Field • Auburn, AL	13-5 (5)	17-4-1 (2-1)
March 14	5:30 PM	Radford	Jane B. Moore Field • Auburn, AL	9-0 (5)	18-4-1 (2-1)
March 14	7:30 PM	IPFW	Jane B. Moore Field • Auburn, AL	10-0 (5)	19-4-1 (2-1)
March 15	3:30 PM	Savannah State	Jane B. Moore Field • Auburn, AL	22-0 (5)	20-4-1 (2-1)
March 15	5:30 PM	Ball State	Jane B. Moore Field • Auburn, AL	15-3 (5)	21-4-1 (2-1)
March 16	1:00 PM	Alabama A&M	Jane B. Moore Field • Auburn, AL	Canceled	21-4-1 (2-1)
March 19	3:00 PM	Murray State	Jane B. Moore Field • Auburn, AL	10-0 (5)	22-4-1 (2-1)
March 19	5:00 PM	Murray State	Jane B. Moore Field • Auburn, AL	11-7	23-4-1 (2-1)
March 21	6:00 PM	Mississippi State	Jane B. Moore Field • Auburn, AL	11-3	24-4-1 (3-1)
March 22	1:00 PM	Mississippi State	Jane B. Moore Field • Auburn, AL	5-2	25-4-1 (4-1)
March 23	2:00 PM	Mississippi State	Jane B. Moore Field • Auburn, AL	2-5	25-5-1 (4-2)
March 26	4:00 PM	Georgia State	Atlanta, GA	16-1 (5)	26-5-1 (4-2)
March 28	5:00 PM	Kentucky	Lexington, KY	7-6	27-5-1 (5-2)
March 30	11:00 AM	Kentucky	Lexington, KY	6-4	28-5-1 (6-2)
March 30	1:30 PM	Kentucky	Lexington, KY	1-2	28-6-1 (6-3)
April 4	5:00 PM	Florida	Katie Seashole Pressly Softball Stadium • Gainesville, FL	2-4	28-7-1 (6-4)
April 5	4:00 PM	Florida	Katie Seashole Pressly Softball Stadium • Gainesville, FL	6-7	28-8-1 (6-5)
April 6	12:00 PM	Florida	Katie Seashole Pressly Softball Stadium • Gainesville, FL	0-1 (8)	28-9-1 (6-6)
April 11	6:00 PM	Missouri	Jane B. Moore Field • Auburn, AL	2-4	28-10-1 (6-7)
April 12	12:00 PM	Missouri	Jane B. Moore Field • Auburn, AL	7-8	28-11-1 (6-8)
April 13	1:00 PM	Missouri	Jane B. Moore Field • Auburn, AL	6-7	28-12-1 (6-9)
April 16	6:30 PM	Alabama	Montgomery, AL	6-2	29-12-1 (6-9)
April 19	1:00 PM	Georgia	Jack Turner Stadium • Athens, GA	2-11	29-13-1 (6-10)
April 19	3:30 PM	Georgia	Jack Turner Stadium • Athens, GA	4-8	29-14-1 (6-11)
April 20	1:00 PM	Georgia	Jack Turner Stadium • Athens, GA	8-1	30-14-1 (7-11)
April 23	6:00 PM	Alabama State	Jane B. Moore Field • Auburn, AL	5-3	31-14-1 (7-11)
April 25	6:00 PM	Texas A&M	Jane B. Moore Field • Auburn, AL	7-6	32-14-1 (8-11)
April 26	1:00 PM	Texas A&M	Jane B. Moore Field • Auburn, AL	6-0	33-14-1 (9-11)
April 27	1:00 PM	Texas A&M	Jane B. Moore Field • Auburn, AL	9-1 (5)	34-14-1 (10-11)
May 2	6:00 PM	South Carolina	Beckham Field • Columbia, SC	5-3 (8)	35-14-1 (11-11)
May 3	3:00 PM	South Carolina	Beckham Field • Columbia, SC	4-7	35-15-1 (11-12)
May 4	12:00 PM	South Carolina	Beckham Field • Columbia, SC	2-4	35-16-1 (11-13)
May 7	5:30 PM	South Carolina	2014 SEC softball tournament • Beckham Field • Columbia, SC	7-5	36-16-1 (11-13)
May 8	2:00 PM	Alabama	2014 SEC softball tournament • Beckham Field • Columbia, SC	4-8	36-17-1 (11-13)
May 16	4:00 PM	North Dakota State	2014 NCAA Division I softball tournament • Regional • Jane Sage Cowles Stadium • Minneapolis, MN	2-5	36-18-1 (11-13)
May 17	4:00 PM	Green Bay	2014 NCAA Division I softball tournament • Regional • Jane Sage Cowles Stadium • Minneapolis, MN	9-1 (5)	37-18-1 (11-13)
May 17	6:30 PM	North Dakota State	2014 NCAA Division I softball tournament • Regional • Jane Sage Cowles Stadium • Minneapolis, MN	1-0	38-18-1 (11-13)
May 18	1:30 PM	Minnesota	2014 NCAA Division I softball tournament • Regional • Jane Sage Cowles Stadium • Minneapolis, MN	4-3 (8)	39-18-1 (11-13)
May 18	4:00 PM	Minnesota	2014 NCAA Division I softball tournament • Regional • Jane Sage Cowles Stadium • Minneapolis, MN	6-8	39-19-1 (11-13)

== Season Notes ==
- First Year under new staff (with Clint Myers as head coach)
- Auburn returned to NCAA Regionals
- Jenna Abbot hit walk off home run versus Minnesota in game 1 to force a winner take all game 2
- Kasey Cooper started all 62 games as a freshman and led the team with a .418 batting average
- Lexi Davis led the team with an ERA of 2.89
- Austyn West led the team in Fielding Percentage but did not return to the team in 2015 for unknown reasons
