= 2015 Big Sky Conference softball tournament =

The 2015 Big Sky Conference softball tournament was held at Miller Ranch Stadium on the campus of Idaho State University in Pocatello, Idaho from May 7 through May 9, 2015. The tournament earned the Big Sky Conference's automatic bid to the 2015 NCAA Division I softball tournament. The entire tournament aired on Watch Big Sky with Jason Ashcraft describing the action.

== Tournament ==
1st Round
1	Idaho State	14
4	Southern Utah	3^{(5)}
2	Sacramento State	3
3	Weber State	4
Lower round 1
2	Sacramento State	8
4	Southern Utah	0^{(5)}

Semifinals
1	Idaho State	1
3	Weber State	9^{(5)}
Lower final
1	Idaho State	6
2	Sacramento State	10

Championship
3	Weber State	13	–
2	Sacramento State	1^{(5)}	–

- All times listed are Mountain Daylight Time.
