= 2026 Big Sky Conference softball tournament =

College softball tournament in Idaho

- Teams: 6
- Format: Double-elimination tournament
- Finals site: UNF Softball Complex; Pocatello, Idaho
- Champions: Idaho State (1st title)
- Winning coach: Andrew Rich (1st title)
- MVP: Ava Brown (Idaho State)
- Television: ESPN+

2026 Big Sky Conference softball standings
	Conf.				Overall
Team	W		L	PCT	W		L	PCT
Idaho State ‍†‍‍^{y}	10	–	5	.667	37	–	18	.673
Northern Colorado ‍‍‍	9	–	6	.600	24	–	27	.471
Sacramento State ‍‍‍	9	–	6	.600	33	–	20	.623
Montana ‍‍‍	9	–	6	.600	22	–	32	.407
Portland State ‍‍‍	4	–	11	.267	14	–	32	.304
Weber State ‍‍‍	4	–	11	.267	14	–	42	.250
† – Conference champion ‡ – Tournament champion y – Invited to the NCAA tournament As of May 7, 2026; Rankings from NFCA/USA Today

The 2026 Big Sky Conference softball tournament was held at Miller Ranch Stadium on the campus of the Idaho State University in Pocatello, Idaho from May 4 through May 7, 2026. The tournament was won by the Idaho State Bengals, who earned the Big Sky Conference's automatic bid to the 2026 NCAA Division I softball tournament.

== Format and seeding ==
All six Big Sky softball teams participated in the tournament and were seeded based on conference record. The top two seeds received a single bye, with the remaining teams playing opening round games.

== Tournament ==
Upper round 1
4	Montana	8
5	Weber State	3
3	Sacramento State	11^{(5)}
6	Portland State	1
Lower round 1
6	Portland State	3
4	Montana	9
5	Weber State	3
2	Northern Colorado	12^{(5)}

Upper round 2
1	Idaho State	10^{(5)}
4	Montana	1
2	Northern Colorado	5
3	Sacramento State	6
Lower round 2
4	Montana	11
2	Northern Colorado	7

Upper final
1	Idaho State	15^{(6)}
3	Sacramento State	7
Lower final
3	Sacramento State	10
4	Montana	7

Final
1	Idaho State	16^{(5)}
3	Sacramento State	8

== All Tournament Team ==
Player	Team
**Ava Brown**	Idaho State
Camryn McDonald	Idaho State
Kira Day	Idaho State
Jenna Kearns	Idaho State
Jaden Moore	Idaho State
Marley Goluskin	Idaho State
Madison Evers-Lyles	Sacramento State
Saskia Raab	Sacramento State
Madi Mendoza	Sacramento State
Anna Cockhill	Montana
Grace Lopez	Montana

MVP in bold
