= 2018 Big Sky Conference softball tournament =

Sports tournament

- Teams: 6
- Format: Double-elimination tournament
- Finals site: Wildcat Softball Field; Ogden, UT
- Champions: Sacramento State (1st title)
- MVP: Suzy Brookshire (Sacramento State)
- Television: ELVN, Pluto TV 230

The 2018 Big Sky Conference softball tournament was held at Wildcat Softball Field on the campus of the Weber State University in Ogden, UT from May 10 through May 12, 2018. The tournament winner earned the Big Sky Conference's automatic bid to the 2018 NCAA Division I softball tournament. This was the third straight year the tournament featured six teams. Thursday and Friday were streamed on Pluto TV with Mike Lageschulte on the call, while Saturday's championship game aired on Eleven Sports. Sacramento State Hornets won the championship for the first time with a 3–0 victory over the Northern Colorado Bears.

Rain postponements Friday caused alterations to the remainder of the schedule. Saturday's winner's bracket semifinal was instead made the championship match. The remainder of the consolation bracket was cancelled. The reason for cancelling the remaining matches was 1) Weber State softball doesn't have outdoor lighting, so games must be completed during daylight hours and 2) more rain was in the forecast Sunday which would have postponed the possible Sunday championship. If this had happened, the regular season champion would have gotten the NCAA auto-bid.

== Tournament ==
Upper round 1
4	Portland State	3
5	Montana	6
3	North Dakota	4
6	Northern Colorado	7
Lower round 1
3	North Dakota	3
5	Montana	2
2	Weber State	3
4	Portland State	4

Upper round 2
1	Sacramento State	7
5	Montana	3
2	Weber State	3
6	Northern Colorado	6
Lower round 2
3	North Dakota
4	Portland State

Upper final
1	Sacramento State	3
6	Northern Colorado	0
Lower final
(Note: Elimination bracket games were cancelled due to inclement weather.)

Final
1	Sacramento State	(Note: Sacramento State was crowned the champions after inclement weather forced the cancellation of the elimination bracket games.)

- All times listed are Mountain Daylight Time.
