= Ricci Woodard =

American softball coach

Current position
- Title: Head coach
- Team: Texas State
- Conference: Pac-12
- Record: 917–543–2 (.628)

Biographical details
- Born: December 18, 1967 (age 58)
- Education: New Mexico State

Coaching career (HC unless noted)
- 2001–present: Texas State
- 2026–present: Texas Volts

Head coaching record
- Overall: 917–543–2 (.628)

Accomplishments and honors

Awards
- 4× Southland Conference Coach of the Year (2001, 2002, 2008, 2012); Sun Belt Conference Coach of the Year (2018)

Richelle Stacy Woodard (born December 18, 1967) is an American softball head coach at Texas State. She is also the head coach for the Texas Volts of the Athletes Unlimited Softball League (AUSL).

== Early life ==
Woodard played college softball at Central Arizona College, where she served as team captain. She also played at New Mexico State and graduated with a degree in education in 1991. Following her playing career she started the softball program at Brazosport High School in Freeport, Texas.

== Coaching career ==
=== Texas State ===
In 2001, Woodard was named the head coach of the Texas State Bobcats softball team. In her first season with Texas State in 2001, she helped lead them to a program best 54–12 record, the Southland Conference regular season and Southland Conference softball tournament championships and an appearance in the 2001 NCAA tournament. Texas State advanced to the regional finals before losing to eventual national champion Arizona. The next year she led the team to a 37–22 overall record, including 23–4 in conference play, winning their second consecutive Southland Conference regular season championship. Following the season she was named the Southland Conference Coach of the Year for the second consecutive year.

In 2009, she led the team to a 40–18 record, and the 2009 Southland Conference softball tournament championship, their second tournament title in program history. In 2011, Texas State won the 2011 Southland Conference softball tournament championship. Her team had a league-leading seven players named to the All-Conference teams.

In 2012, during Texas State's final season in the Southland Conference, her team won the Southland Conference regular season and tournament championships. The Bobcats posted an 18–2 record in conference play, their highest conference winning percentage (.900) since 2001. Following the season she was named the Southland Conference Coach of the Year for the fourth time in her career. In 2013, during the 50th anniversary of the Southland Conference, she was selected as the all-time winningest coach in conference history with a 249–75–1 record from 2001 to 2012. She led Texas State to six Southland Conference regular-season titles and four tournament titles.

On July 1, 2013, Texas State joined the Sun Belt Conference. On March 15, 2015, she earned her 500th career victory, becoming the 106th NCAA Division I coach all-time to reach the milestone. In 2018, she led her team to a 43–16 record and the Sun Belt Conference regular season and tournament championships for the first time in program history. Following the season she was named the Sun Belt Conference Coach of the Year.

In 2024, she led her team to a 47–15 record and the Sun Belt Conference softball tournament championship for the second time in program history.

On March 31, 2026, during a game against UTSA, she earned her 900th career victory.

=== Texas Volts ===
On November 24, 2025, Woodard was named head coach of the Texas Volts of the AUSL for the 2026 AUSL season. The Volts' general manager, Cat Osterman, spent six seasons on Texas State's staff with Woodard from 2015 to 2020.

== Head coaching record ==
Record table
| Season | Team | Overall | Conference | Standing | Postseason |
|---|---|---|---|---|---|
Texas State (Southland Conference) (2001–2012)
| 2001 | Texas State | 54–12 | 26–1 | 1st | NCAA Regional |
| 2002 | Texas State | 37–22 | 23–4 | 1st | |
| 2003 | Texas State | 46–18–1 | 21–5–1 | 2nd | NCAA Regional |
| 2004 | Texas State | 37–20 | 19–7 | 2nd | |
| 2005 | Texas State | 26–27 | 18–8 | 3rd | |
| 2006 | Texas State | 34–22 | 18–5 | 2nd | |
| 2007 | Texas State | 32–26 | 18–12 | 3rd | |
| 2008 | Texas State | 35–18 | 25–5 | 1st | |
| 2009 | Texas State | 40–18 | 23–6 | 1st | NCAA Regional |
| 2010 | Texas State | 27–26 | 20–10 | 2nd | |
| 2011 | Texas State | 33–25 | 20–10 | 3rd | NCAA Regional |
| 2012 | Texas State | 39–17 | 18–2 | 2nd | NCAA Regional |
| Texas State: | | 440–251–1 (.637) | 249–75–1 (.768) | | |
Texas State (Western Athletic Conference) (2013)
| 2013 | Texas State | 18–38 | 10–11 | 4th | |
| Texas State: | | 18–38 (.321) | 10–11 (.476) | | |
Texas State (Sun Belt Conference) (2014–present)
| 2014 | Texas State | 26–30 | 9–12 | 5th | |
| 2015 | Texas State | 32–21 | 14–6 | 3rd | |
| 2016 | Texas State | 40–22 | 15–9 | 3rd | NCAA Regional |
| 2017 | Texas State | 42–17 | 18–8 | 2nd | NCAA Regional |
| 2018 | Texas State | 43–16 | 18–5 | 1st | NCAA Regional |
| 2019 | Texas State | 29–25 | 16–10 | 5th | |
| 2020 | Texas State | 15–9 | 2–1 | | Season cancelled due to COVID-19 |
| 2021 | Texas State | 39–14 | 17–6 | 2nd | NCAA Regional |
| 2022 | Texas State | 38–19 | 19–8 | 3rd | |
| 2023 | Texas State | 35–25–1 | 13–9–1 | 5th | NCAA Regional |
| 2024 | Texas State | 47–15 | 18–6 | 2nd | NCAA Regional |
| 2025 | Texas State | 34–19 | 16–8 | 1st | |
| 2026 | Texas State | 39–22 | 16–8 | 3rd | NCAA Regional |
| Texas State: | | 459–254–1 (.644) | 191–96–1 (.665) | | |
| Total: | | 917–543–2 (.628) | | | |
National champion Postseason invitational champion Conference regular season champion Conference regular season and conference tournament champion Division regular season champion Division regular season and conference tournament champion Conference tournament champion
