= 2001 NCAA Division I softball rankings =

2001 NCAA Division I softball season
- Defending Champions: Oklahoma

Tournament

Women's College World Series
- Champions: Arizona (6th title)
- Runners-up: UCLA (18th WCWS Appearance)
- Winning Coach: Mike Candrea (6th title)
- WCWS MOP: Jennie Finch (Arizona)

Seasons
- ← 2000 2002 →

The following human polls make up the 2001 NCAA Division I women's softball rankings. The NFCA/USA Today Poll is voted on by a panel of 32 Division I softball coaches and ranks to top 25 teams nationally.

== Legend ==
	Increase in ranking
	Decrease in ranking
	Not ranked previous week
Italics	Number of first place votes
(#–#)	Win-loss record
т	Tied with team above or below also with this symbol

== NFCA/USA Today ==
	Week 0 Pre	Week 1 Feb 21	Week 2 Feb 28	Week 3 Mar 7	Week 4 Mar 14	Week 5 Mar 21	Week 6 Mar 28	Week 7 Apr 4	Week 8 Apr 11	Week 9 Apr 18	Week 10 Apr 25	Week 11 May 2	Week 12 May 9	Week Final May 30	
1.	UCLA (13)	UCLA (15–0) (19)	UCLA (19–0) (20)	UCLA (26–0) (19)	UCLA (34–0) (18)	UCLA (35–0) (26)	UCLA (35–0)	UCLA (37–1) (25)	UCLA (40–3) (18)	UCLA (42–3) (21)	Arizona (46–4) (21)	Arizona (51–4) (26)	Arizona (54–4) (25)	Arizona (65–4) (27)	1.
2.	Oklahoma (10)	Arizona (15–0) (6)	Arizona (20–0) (7)	Arizona (27–0) (8)	Arizona (28–0) (9)	Arizona (33–2) (1)	Arizona (36–2)	Arizona (38–2) (2)	Arizona (39–4) (7)	Arizona (41–4) (6)	UCLA (44–4) (6)	UCLA (49–4) (1)	UCLA (53–4) (2)	UCLA (60–6)	2.
3.	Arizona (4)	Oklahoma (8–0) (2)	Alabama (14–0)	Alabama (18–0)	California (28–0)	California (32–1)	California (39–1)	Alabama (34–1)	Stanford (35–3–1) (1)	Stanford (38–5–1)	Stanford (42–6–1)	Stanford (44–9–1)	LSU (49–9)	LSU (59–11) т	3.
4.	Washington	Alabama (10–0)	California (11–0)	California (19–0)	Alabama (22–0)	Alabama (25–0)	Alabama (28–1)	Stanford (32–2–1)	California (41–4)	California (44–6)	California (45–8)	LSU (48–10)	Stanford (46–12–1)	Stanford (54–16–1) т	4.
5.	Alabama	California (7–0)	Oklahoma (12–2)	Oklahoma (17–3) т	Oklahoma (21–3) т	Stanford (28–2–1)	Stanford (30–2–1)	California (39–4)	LSU (35–7)	LSU (38–7)	LSU (42–8)	California (47–8)	Oklahoma (41–7)	Oklahoma (50–9)	5.
6.	Arizona State	Arizona State (10–2) т	Stanford (16–1–1)	Stanford (21–1–1) т	Stanford (28–2–1) т	Oklahoma (26–4)	Oklahoma (28–5)	LSU (30–6)	Alabama (34–4)	Oklahoma (34–7)	Alabama (44–5)	Oklahoma (40–7)	California (48–13)	California (54–17)	6.
7.	California	LSU (7–1) т	Fresno State (8–2)	Fresno State (8–2)	Fresno State (14–4)	LSU (23–5)	LSU (25–6)	Oklahoma (29–7)	Oklahoma (32–7)	Alabama (38–5)	Oklahoma (37–7)	Alabama (45–10)	Alabama (47–7)	Iowa (49–14)	7.
8.	LSU	Fresno State (5–0)	LSU (13–4)	LSU (17–4)	LSU (20–5)	Cal State Fullerton (25–8)	Cal State Fullerton (29–8)	DePaul (24–7–1)	Arizona State (30–9) (1)	Arizona State (30–11)	Cal State Fullerton (41–11)	Notre Dame (46–3)	Notre Dame (50–3)	Michigan (43–17–1)	8.
9.	Fresno State	Stanford (12–1)	Arizona State (13–4)	Arizona State (15–5)	Cal State Fullerton (20–6)	Arizona State (25–8)	Arizona State (25–8)	Arizona State (27–9)	DePaul (29–7–1)	Cal State Fullerton (38–11)	Arizona State (30–14) т	Cal State Fullerton (43–12)	Arizona State (34–17)	Arizona State (36–22)	9.
10.	DePaul	Washington (6–4)	Cal State Fullerton (14–5)	Cal State Fullerton (19–6)	Arizona State (21–7)	DePaul (14–7–1)	DePaul (17–7–1)	Cal State Fullerton (33–10)	Cal State Fullerton (35–10)	DePaul (33–8–1)	Notre Dame (40–3) т	Nebraska (45–10)	Cal State Fullerton (46–12)	Alabama (50–11)	10.
11.	Michigan	Cal State Fullerton (12–3)	DePaul (7–1–1)	DePaul (7–1–1)	DePaul (10–4–1)	Fresno State (17–8)	Notre Dame (18–3)	Notre Dame (26–3)	Notre Dame (32–3)	Notre Dame (36–3)	Nebraska (42–10)	Arizona State (31–17)	Nebraska (47–11)	Notre Dame (54–7)	11.
12.	Nebraska	Iowa (4–1)	Washington (10–6)	Iowa (6–1)	Washington (17–7)	Notre Dame (18–3)	Iowa (18–6)	Iowa (24–7)	Iowa (30–7)	Nebraska (37–10) т	DePaul (36–11–1)	Washington (33–18)	Washington (36–19)	Cal State Fullerton (48–14)	12.
13.	Iowa	DePaul (4–0)	Iowa (4–1)	Washington (15–7)	Iowa (12–4)	Iowa (18–6)	Fresno State (23–10)	Fresno State (26–11)	Washington (25–14)	Washington (27–16) т	Washington (29–17)	DePaul (42–12–1)	DePaul (47–13–1)	Washington (40–23)	13.
14.	Cal State Fullerton	Notre Dame (6–0)	Oregon State (15–3–1)	Notre Dame (11–1)	Notre Dame (13–1) т	Washington (20–9)	Oregon State (27–10–1)	Washington (24–12)	Nebraska (33–10)	Fresno State (31–15)	Oregon State (35–16–1)	Oregon State (38–18–1)	Oregon State (40–22–1)	Nebraska (51–15)	14.
15.	Stanford	Nebraska (5–4)	Notre Dame (6–0)	Oregon State (17–5–1)	Oregon State (21–10–1) т	Oregon State (21–10–1)	Washington (22–11)	Nebraska (29–10)	Fresno State (28–12)	Iowa (30–9)	Iowa (35–10)	Iowa (39–10)	Iowa (42–11)	Florida State (58–12)	15.
16.	Oregon State	Florida State (11–1) т	South Carolina (11–7–1)	Florida State (22–3)	Florida State (24–4)	Florida State (29–5)	Florida State (31–5)	Oregon State (29–13–1)	Oregon State (30–15–1)	Oregon State (32–15–1)	Fresno State (33–17)	Fresno State (38–17)	Florida State (52–8)	Texas State (54–12)	16.
17.	Florida State	Oregon State (12–3) т	Nebraska (7–7)	Nebraska (10–9)	South Carolina (16–9–1)	South Carolina (20–10–1)	Nebraska (24–9)	Florida State (34–6)	Florida State (39–7)	Florida State (42–7)	Florida State (47–7)	Florida State (49–7)	Fresno State (38–17)	Louisiana–Lafayette (45–8)	17.
18.	South Carolina	Michigan (2–4)	Michigan (5–6)	South Carolina (12–8–1)	Nebraska (15–9)	Nebraska (21–9)	Pacific (26–5)	Pacific (31–6)	Pacific (36–6)	Pacific (38–9)	Pacific (43–9)	Pacific (45–10)	Pacific (47–11)	Pacific (50–13)	18.
19.	Notre Dame	South Carolina (8–6)	Florida State (15–3)	Texas A&M (14–5)	Baylor (25–7)	Baylor (25–7)	South Carolina (21–12–1)	South Carolina (23–12–1)	South Carolina (29–12–1)	Texas State (36–8)	Texas State (39–8)	Texas State (44–8)	Louisiana–Lafayette (45–8) т	DePaul (51–16–1)	19.
20.	Oregon	Noregon (10–7)	Texas A&M (13–4)	Michigan (5–6)	Texas A&M (16–5)	Texas A&M (22–6)	Texas A&M (23–8)	Baylor (29–11)	Texas State (33–8)	South Carolina (31–14–1)	Louisiana–Lafayette (36–7)	Louisiana (42–7)	Texas State (48–9) т	Oregon State (43–24)	20.
21.	Southern Miss	Texas A&M (10–4)	Southern Miss (10–5)	Baylor (22–6)	Michigan (6–7)	Wisconsin (15–9)	Baylor (27–10)	Wisconsin (20–12)	Wisconsin (23–15)	Louisiana–Lafayette (31–6)	Michigan (30–12–1)	South Carolina (37–17–1)	Michigan (37–14–1)	South Florida (43–34)	21.
22.	Long Beach State	Texas (9–4)	Oregon (14–8)	Texas State (17–7)	Wisconsin (12–9)	Pacific (24–5)	Texas State (24–7)	Texas State (28–7)	Texas A&M (27–11)	Texas A&M (28–12)	UMass (31–9)	Michigan (32–14–1)	South Carolina (37–17–1)	Fresno State (39–19)	22.
23.	Mississippi State	Southern Miss (6–4)	Baylor (19–4)	Wisconsin (7–7) т	Texas State (21–7)	Texas State (24–7)	Wisconsin (17–11)	Texas A&M (24–11)	Baylor (30–14)	UMass (23–9)	Texas A&M (29–15) т	UMass (34–10)	Cal State Northridge (30–22) т	South Carolina (40–20–1)	23.
24.	Texas	UMass (3–2)	Wisconsin (7–7)	Cal State Northridge (10–5) т	Cal State Northridge (11–7)	Cal State Northridge (14–11) т	Louisiana–Lafayette (21–5)	Louisiana–Lafayette (26–5)	Louisiana–Lafayette (27–6)	Michigan (27–11–1)	South Carolina (34–16–1) т	Cal State Northridge (27–22)	UMass (39–11) т	San Diego State (41–25)	24.
25.	Utah	FIU (12–4)	Texas State (12–4)	Oregon (16–13) т	Pacific (18–5)	Michigan (9–9) т	Florida Atlantic (31–11)	Cal State Northridge (30–6)	UMass (29–9)	Cal State Northridge (25–19)	Cal State Northridge (26–20)	Texas A&M (30–7)	Kansas (31–25)	UMass (44–13)	25.
	Week 0 Pre	Week 1 Feb 21	Week 2 Feb 28	Week 3 Mar 7	Week 4 Mar 14	Week 5 Mar 21	Week 6 Mar 28	Week 7 Apr 4	Week 8 Apr 11	Week 9 Apr 18	Week 10 Apr 25	Week 11 May 2	Week 12 May 9	Week Final May 30	
		Dropped: 22. Long Beach State; 23. Mississippi State; 25. Utah	Dropped: 22. Texas; 24. UMass; 25. FIU	Dropped: Southern Miss	Dropped: 24. Oregon	None	Dropped: 24. Cal State Northridge; 24. Michigan	Dropped: 25. Florida Atlantic	Dropped: 25. Cal State Northridge	Dropped: 21. Wisconsin; 23. Baylor	None	None	Dropped: 25. Texas A&M	Dropped: 23. Cal State Northridge; 25. Kansas	
