= 2001 UCLA Bruins softball team =

American college softball season

2001 UCLA Bruins softball

NCAA Regional No. 2 champion

Women's College World Series, runner-up
- Conference: Pacific-10 Conference
- Record: 62–6 (16–5 Pac-10)
- Head coach: Sue Enquist (13th season)
- Home stadium: Sunset Field

2001 Pacific-10 Conference softball standings
	Conf.						Overall
Team	W		L		T	PCT	W		L		T	PCT
No. 1 Arizona ‍†‍‍^{y}	19	–	2	–	0	.905	65	–	4	–	0	.942
No. 2 UCLA ‍‍‍^{y}	16	–	5	–	0	.762	62	–	6	–	0	.912
No. 3 Stanford ‍‍‍^{y}	11	–	10	–	0	.524	54	–	16	–	1	.768
No. 13 Washington ‍‍‍^{y}	11	–	10	–	0	.524	40	–	23	–	0	.635
No. 20 Oregon State ‍‍‍^{y}	10	–	10	–	0	.500	44	–	24	–	1	.645
No. 9 Arizona State ‍‍‍^{y}	9	–	12	–	0	.429	36	–	22	–	0	.621
No. 6 California ‍‍‍^{y}	6	–	14	–	0	.300	54	–	18	–	0	.750
Oregon ‍‍‍	1	–	20	–	0	.048	28	–	40	–	0	.412
† – Conference champion y – Invited to the NCAA tournament As of May 31, 2001; Rankings from NFCA/USA Today

The 2001 UCLA Bruins softball team represented the University of California, Los Angeles in the 2001 NCAA Division I softball season. The Bruins were coached by Sue Enquist, in her thirteenth season as head coach. The Bruins played their home games at Easton Stadium and finished with a record of 62–6. They competed in the Pacific-10 Conference, where they finished second with a 16–5 record.

The Bruins were invited to the 2001 NCAA Division I softball tournament, where they swept the Regional and then completed a run to the title game of the Women's College World Series where they fell to champion Arizona.

== Personnel ==
=== Roster ===
2001 UCLA Bruins roster
Pitchers: 7 - Amanda Freed – junior; 23 – Stephanie Swenson – senior; 14 – Keira Goerl – freshman; 22 – Courtney Dale - (redshirt) Senior; Catchers: 4 – Marin Noack – senior; 33 - Stacey Nuveman – junior	Infielders: 5 – Casey Hiraiwa - (redshirt) Junior; 10 – Crissy Buck – junior; 11 – Monique Mejia – sophomore; 20 – Claire Sua – freshman; 21 – Tairia Mims – sophomore; 23 – Toria Auelua – sophomore; 27 - Natasha Watley – sophomore	Outfielders: 2 – Erin Rahn – junior; 3 – Lupe Brambila – senior; 24 – Marcel Torres – freshman; 44 – Stephanie Ramos – freshman; Utility: 13 – Julie Hoshizaki – freshman; 9 – Amanda Simpson – freshman

=== Coaches ===
2001 UCLA Bruins softball coaching staff
- Sue Enquist – Head coach – 13th season
- Kelly Inouye-Perez – Assistant coach – 8th season
- Lisa Fernandez – Assistant coach – 5th season

== Schedule ==
Legend
	UCLA win
	UCLA loss
	Tie
*	Non-Conference game

2001 UCLA Bruins softball game log
Regular season

February
Date	Opponent	Rank	Site/stadium	Score	Overall record	Pac-10 record
Feb 3	at San Jose State*	No. 1	SJSU Field • San Jose, CA	W 8–0^{5}	1–0	
Feb 3	Cal State Northridge*	No. 1	Easton Stadium • Los Angeles, CA	W 13–0^{5}	2–0	
Feb 3	Cal Poly*	No. 1	Easton Stadium • Los Angeles, CA	W 5–0	3–0	
Feb 4	Cal State Northridge*	No. 1	Easton Stadium • Los Angeles, CA	W 7–0	4–0	
Feb 4	Cal Poly*	No. 1	Easton Stadium • Los Angeles, CA	W 10–2^{6}	5–0	
Feb 7	at No. 14 Cal State Fullerton*	No. 1	Anderson Family Field • Fullerton, CA	W 6–0	6–0	
Feb 7	at No. 14Cal State Fullerton*	No. 1	Anderson Family Field • Fullerton, CA	W 18–3^{5}	7–0	
Feb 10	San Diego*	No. 1	Easton Stadium • Los Angeles, CA	W 8–0^{6}	8–0	
Feb 10	San Diego*	No. 1	Easton Stadium • Los Angeles, CA	W 7–0	9–0	
Feb 14	No. 22 Long Beach State*	No. 1	Easton Stadium • Los Angeles, CA	W 7–0	10–0	
Feb 16	vs Portland State*	No. 1	Rebel Softball Diamond • Paradise, NV	W 20–0^{5}	11–0	
Feb 16	vs Kansas*	No. 1	Rebel Softball Diamond • Paradise, NV	W 15–1^{5}	12–0	
Feb 17	vs Wisconsin*	No. 1	Rebel Softball Diamond • Paradise, NV	W 9–2	13–0	
Feb 17	vs No. 12 Nebraska*	No. 1	Rebel Softball Diamond • Paradise, NV	W 6–2	14–0	
Feb 18	vs FIU*	No. 1	Rebel Softball Diamond • Paradise, NV	W 10–0^{5}	15–0	
Feb 23	vs Wisconsin*	No. 1	Red and Charline McCombs Field • Austin, TX	W 12–1^{5}	16–0	
Feb 23	vs No. 11 Cal State Fullerton*	No. 1	Red and Charline McCombs Field • Austin, TX	W 4–0	17–0	
Feb 24	at No. 22 Texas*	No. 1	Red and Charline McCombs Field • Austin, TX	W 4–3^{8}	18–0	
Feb 25	vs Wisconsin*	No. 1	Red and Charline McCombs Field • Austin, TX	W 1–0	19–0	
Feb 26	at Texas State*	No. 1	Bobcat Softball Stadium • San Marcos, TX	W 4–3^{10}	20–0	
Feb 26	at Texas State*	No. 1	Bobcat Softball Stadium • San Marcos, TX	W 3–1	21–0	

March
Date	Opponent	Rank	Site/stadium	Score	Overall record	Pac-10 record
Mar 2	Colorado State*	No. 1	Easton Stadium • Los Angeles, CA	W 11–3^{6}	22–0	
Mar 2	Colorado State*	No. 1	Easton Stadium • Los Angeles, CA	W 2–0	23–0	
Mar 3	South Florida*	No. 1	Easton Stadium • Los Angeles, CA	W 10–0^{5}	24–0	
Mar 3	South Florida*	No. 1	Easton Stadium • Los Angeles, CA	W 5–3	25–0	
Mar 4	UNLV*	No. 1	Easton Stadium • Los Angeles, CA	W 3–0	26–0	
Mar 6	UC Riverside*	No. 1	Easton Stadium • Los Angeles, CA	W 10–0^{5}	27–0	
Mar 6	UC Riverside*	No. 1	Easton Stadium • Los Angeles, CA	W 4–0	28–0	
Mar 8	vs Colorado State*	No. 1	Margie Wright Diamond • Fresno, CA	W 8–1	29–0	
Mar 9	vs Cal Poly*	No. 1	Margie Wright Diamond • Fresno, CA	W 9–1^{6}	30–0	
Mar 9	vs No. 11 DePaul*	No. 1	Margie Wright Diamond • Fresno, CA	W 4–0	31–0	
Mar 10	vs New Mexico State*	No. 1	Margie Wright Diamond • Fresno, CA	W 4–0	32–0	
Mar 10	vs No. 15 Oregon State*	No. 1	Margie Wright Diamond • Fresno, CA	W 3–2	33–0	
Mar 11	at No. 7 Fresno State*	No. 1	Margie Wright Diamond • Fresno, CA	W 8–2	34–0	
Mar 14	at UC Santa Barbara*	No. 1	Campus Diamond • Santa Barbara, CA	W 6–1	35–0	
Mar 30	at No. 5 Stanford	No. 1	Boyd & Jill Smith Family Stadium • Stanford, CA	L 0–1	35–1	0–1
Mar 31	at No. 3 California	No. 1	Levine-Fricke Field • Berkeley, CA	W 2–1^{9}	36–1	1–1

April
Date	Opponent	Rank	Site/stadium	Score	Overall record	Pac-10 record
Apr 1	at No. 3 California	No. 1	Levine-Fricke Field • Berkeley, CA	W 5–1	37–1	2–1
Apr 4	at No. 25 Cal State Northridge*	No. 1	Northridge, CA	W 5–1	38–1	
Apr 4	at No. 25 Cal State Northridge*	No. 1	Northridge, CA	W 12–1^{6}	39–1	
Apr 6	No. 9 Arizona State	No. 1	Easton Stadium • Los Angeles, CA	L 1–6	39–2	2–2
Apr 7	No. 2 Arizona	No. 1	Easton Stadium • Los Angeles, CA	L 0–4	39–3	2–3
Apr 8	No. 2 Arizona	No. 1	Easton Stadium • Los Angeles, CA	W 3–0	40–3	3–3
Apr 13	No. 13 Washington	No. 1	Easton Stadium • Los Angeles, CA	W 5–4^{14}	41–3	4–3
Apr 14	No. 13 Washington	No. 1	Easton Stadium • Los Angeles, CA	W 4–0	42–3	5–3
Apr 20	at No. 16 Oregon State	No. 1	OSU Softball Complex • Corvallis, OR	L 1–2	42–4	5–4
Apr 21	at Oregon	No. 1	Howe Field • Eugene, OR	W 4–3	43–4	6–4
Apr 22	at Oregon	No. 1	Howe Field • Eugene, OR	W 6–3	44–4	7–4
Apr 25	at UC Riverside*	No. 2	Riverside, CA	W 12–0^{5}	45–4	
Apr 25	at UC Riverside*	No. 2	Riverside, CA	W 8–0^{5}	46–4	
Apr 27	No. 4 California	No. 2	Easton Stadium • Los Angeles, CA	W 2–0	47–4	8–4
Apr 28	No. 3 Stanford	No. 2	Easton Stadium • Los Angeles, CA	W 8–0^{5}	48–4	9–4
Apr 29	No. 3 Stanford	No. 2	Easton Stadium • Los Angeles, CA	W 2–0	49–4	10–4

May
Date	Opponent	Rank	Site/stadium	Score	Overall record	Pac-10 record
May 2	at No. 12 Washington	No. 2	Husky Softball Stadium • Seattle, WA	W 4–3	50–4	11–4
May 4	Oregon	No. 2	Easton Stadium • Los Angeles, CA	W 6–4	51–4	12–4
May 5	No. 14 Oregon State	No. 2	Easton Stadium • Los Angeles, CA	W 4–0	52–4	13–4
May 6	No. 14 Oregon State	No. 2	Easton Stadium • Los Angeles, CA	W 4–1	53–4	14–4
May 11	at No. 1 Arizona	No. 2	Rita Hillenbrand Memorial Stadium • Tucson, AZ	L 0–4	53–5	14–5
May 12	at No. 9 Arizona State	No. 2	Alberta B. Farrington Softball Stadium • Tempe, AZ	W 1–0	54–5	15–5
May 12	at No. 9 Arizona State	No. 2	Alberta B. Farrington Softball Stadium • Tempe, AZ	W 8–6^{8}	55–5	16–5

Postseason

NCAA Regional No. 2
Date	Opponent	Rank (Seed)	Site/stadium	Score	Overall record	NCAAT record
May 17	Coastal Carolina	No. 2	Easton Stadium • Los Angeles, CA	W 8–0^{5}	56–5	1–0
May 18	No. 23 Cal State Northridge	No. 2	Easton Stadium • Los Angeles, CA	W 9–0	57–5	2–0
May 19	San Diego State	No. 2	Easton Stadium • Los Angeles, CA	W 3–1	58–5	3–0
May 20	San Diego State	No. 2	Easton Stadium • Los Angeles, CA	W 11–0^{5}	59–5	4–0

NCAA Women's College World Series
Date	Opponent	Seed	Site/stadium	Score	Overall record	WCWS Record
May 24	No. 15 (7) Iowa	No. 2 (2)	ASA Hall of Fame Stadium • Oklahoma City, OK	W 7–0	60–5	1–0
May 25	No. 4 (6) Stanford	No. 2 (2)	ASA Hall of Fame Stadium • Oklahoma City, OK	W 5–0	61–5	2–0
May 27	No. 3 (3) LSU	No. 2 (2)	ASA Hall of Fame Stadium • Oklahoma City, OK	W 6–0	62–5	3–0
May 28	No. 1 (1) Arizona	No. 2 (2)	ASA Hall of Fame Stadium • Oklahoma City, OK	L 0–1	62–6	3–1

== Ranking movements ==
Ranking movements Legend: ██ Increase in ranking ██ Decrease in ranking
	Week													
Poll	Pre	1	2	3	4	5	6	7	8	9	10	11	12	Final
NFCA/USA Today	1	1	1	1	1	1	1	1	1	1	2	2	2	2
