= 2001 NCAA Division I softball season =

American college softball season

- Defending Champions: Oklahoma

Tournament

Women's College World Series
- Champions: Arizona (6th title)
- Runners-up: UCLA (18th WCWS Appearance)
- Winning Coach: Mike Candrea (6th title)
- WCWS MOP: Jennie Finch (Arizona)

Seasons
- ← 2000 2002 →

The 2001 NCAA Division I softball season, play of college softball in the United States organized by the National Collegiate Athletic Association (NCAA) at the Division I level, began in February 2001. The season progressed through the regular season, many conference tournaments and championship series, and concluded with the 2001 NCAA Division I softball tournament and 2001 Women's College World Series. The Women's College World Series, consisting of the eight remaining teams in the NCAA Tournament and held in held in Oklahoma City at ASA Hall of Fame Stadium, ended on May 28, 2001.

== Conference standings ==
2001 Big 12 Conference softball standings
	Conf.				Overall
Team	W		L	PCT	W		L	PCT
No. 14 Nebraska ‍†‍‍^{y}	16	–	2	.889	51	–	15	.773
No. 5 Oklahoma ‍‍‡‍^{y}	14	–	2	.875	50	–	9	.847
Texas Tech ‍‍‍^{y}	10	–	8	.556	37	–	24	.607
Kansas ‍‍‍	10	–	8	.556	32	–	27	.542
Oklahoma State ‍‍‍	8	–	8	.500	28	–	23	.549
Baylor ‍‍‍	7	–	9	.438	38	–	22	.633
Texas A&M ‍‍‍	7	–	11	.389	32	–	19	.627
Missouri ‍‍‍	5	–	11	.313	31	–	28	.525
Texas ‍‍‍	5	–	13	.278	24	–	29	.453
Iowa State ‍‍‍	2	–	12	.143	14	–	27	.341
† – Conference champion ‡ – Tournament champion y – Invited to the NCAA tournament Rankings from NFCA/USA Today

2001 Big Ten Conference softball standings
	Conf.						Overall
Team	W		L		T	PCT	W		L		T	PCT
No. 8 Michigan ‍†‍‍^{y}	17	–	3	–	0	.850	43	–	17	–	1	.713
No. 7 Iowa ‍‍‡‍^{y}	16	–	4	–	0	.800	49	–	14	–	0	.778
Ohio State ‍‍‍	14	–	6	–	0	.700	46	–	18	–	0	.719
Illinois ‍‍‍	12	–	8	–	0	.600	49	–	23	–	0	.681
Penn State ‍‍‍^{y}	9	–	11	–	0	.450	36	–	26	–	0	.581
Wisconsin ‍‍‍^{y}	9	–	11	–	0	.450	33	–	27	–	0	.550
Purdue ‍‍‍	9	–	11	–	0	.450	34	–	24	–	1	.585
Northwestern ‍‍‍	8	–	12	–	0	.400	13	–	18	–	0	.419
Minnesota ‍‍‍	7	–	13	–	0	.350	36	–	22	–	1	.619
Michigan State ‍‍‍	5	–	15	–	0	.250	21	–	39	–	0	.350
Indiana ‍‍‍	4	–	16	–	0	.200	16	–	36	–	0	.308
† – Conference champion ‡ – Tournament champion y – Invited to the NCAA tournament As of June 2001; Rankings from NFCA/USA Today

2001 Pacific-10 Conference softball standings
	Conf.						Overall
Team	W		L		T	PCT	W		L		T	PCT
No. 1 Arizona ‍†‍‍^{y}	19	–	2	–	0	.905	65	–	4	–	0	.942
No. 2 UCLA ‍‍‍^{y}	16	–	5	–	0	.762	62	–	6	–	0	.912
No. 3 Stanford ‍‍‍^{y}	11	–	10	–	0	.524	54	–	16	–	1	.768
No. 13 Washington ‍‍‍^{y}	11	–	10	–	0	.524	40	–	23	–	0	.635
No. 20 Oregon State ‍‍‍^{y}	10	–	10	–	0	.500	44	–	24	–	1	.645
No. 9 Arizona State ‍‍‍^{y}	9	–	12	–	0	.429	36	–	22	–	0	.621
No. 6 California ‍‍‍^{y}	6	–	14	–	0	.300	54	–	18	–	0	.750
Oregon ‍‍‍	1	–	20	–	0	.048	28	–	40	–	0	.412
† – Conference champion y – Invited to the NCAA tournament As of May 31, 2001; Rankings from NFCA/USA Today

2001 Southland Conference softball standings
	Conf.						Overall
Team	W		L		T	PCT	W		L		T	PCT
Southwest Texas State ‍†‍‍^{y}	26	–	1	–	0	.963	54	–	12	–	0	.818
Louisiana–Monroe ‍‍‍	17	–	10	–	0	.630	31	–	22	–	0	.585
Texas–Arlington ‍‍‍	15	–	10	–	0	.600	25	–	22	–	1	.531
Southeastern Louisiana ‍‍‍	16	–	11	–	0	.593	31	–	22	–	0	.585
Northwestern State ‍‍‍	15	–	11	–	0	.577	30	–	20	–	0	.600
McNeese State ‍‍‍	13	–	13	–	0	.500	21	–	32	–	0	.396
Texas–San Antonio ‍‍‍	12	–	15	–	0	.444	29	–	31	–	0	.483
Stephen F. Austin ‍‍‍	12	–	15	–	0	.444	24	–	29	–	0	.453
Nicholls State ‍‍‍	5	–	22	–	0	.185	21	–	34	–	0	.382
Sam Houston State ‍‍‍	2	–	25	–	0	.074	20	–	34	–	0	.370
† – Conference champion y – Invited to the NCAA tournament As of May 20, 2001; Rankings from NFCA/USA Today

== Women's College World Series ==
The 2001 NCAA Women's College World Series took place from May 24 to May 28, 2001, in Oklahoma City.

First round
1	Arizona	3
8	California	2
4	Michigan	0
5	Oklahoma	2
8	California	5
4	Michigan	2
3	LSU	1
6	Stanford	2^{8}
2	UCLA	2
7	Iowa	0
3	LSU	2
7	Iowa	1

Second round
1	Arizona	5^{8}
5	Oklahoma	4
6	Stanford	1
8	California	0
2	UCLA	5
6	Stanford	0
5	Oklahoma	1
3	LSU	2^{13}

Semifinals
1	Arizona	1	—
6	Stanford	0	—
2	UCLA	6	—
3	LSU	0	—

Finals
1	Arizona	1
2	UCLA	0

== Season leaders ==
Batting

- Batting average: .455 – Oli Keohohou, BYU Cougars
- RBIs: 84 – Toni Mascarenas, Arizona Wildcats
- Home runs: 25 – Toni Mascarenas, Arizona Wildcats

Pitching

- Wins: 39-8 – Kristi Hanks, Iowa Hawkeyes
- ERA: 0.46 (10 ER/152.0 IP) – Amanda Freed, UCLA Bruins
- Strikeouts: 421 – Amanda Renfroe, Texas Tech Red Raiders

== Records ==
NCAA Division I season winning percentage: 32-0 (100%) – Jennie Finch, Arizona Wildcats

Freshman class winning percentage: 27-2 (93%) – Keira Goerl, UCLA Bruins

Sophomore class walks: 93 – Veronica Nelson, California Golden Bears

Junior class consecutive wins streak: 32 – Jennie Finch, Arizona Wildcats; February 2-May 28, 2001

== Awards ==
- Honda Sports Award Softball:

Jennie Finch, Arizona Wildcats

YEAR	W	L	GP	GS	CG	SHO	SV	IP	H	R	ER	BB	SO	ERA	WHIP
2001	32	0	32	29	27	19	0	207.0	102	19	16	45	279	0.54	0.71

YEAR	G	AB	R	H	BA	RBI	HR	3B	2B	TB	SLG	BB	SO	SB	SBA
2001	67	198	37	62	.313	57	11	2	11	110	.555%	24	25	0	0

== All America Teams ==
The following players were members of the All-American Teams.

First Team

Position	Player	Class	School
P	Jennie Finch	JR.	Arizona Wildcats
P	Britni Sneed	JR.	LSU Tigers
P	Dana Sorenson	SO.	Stanford Cardinal
C	Stacey Nuveman	JR.	UCLA Bruins
1B	Sarah Beeson	JR.	Stanford Cardinal
2B	Kelsey Kollen	JR.	Michigan Wolverines
3B	Toni Mascarenas	SR.	Arizona Wildcats
SS	Natasha Watley	SO.	UCLA Bruins
OF	Lauren Bauer	SR.	Arizona Wildcats
OF	Oli Keohohou	FR.	BYU Cougars
OF	Kelly Kretschman	SR.	Alabama Crimson Tide
DP	Leneah Manuma	FR.	Arizona Wildcats
UT	Kellie Wilkerson	JR.	Mississippi State Bulldogs
AT-L	Kelli Braitsch	SO.	Oklahoma Sooners
AT-L	Kristi Hanks	JR.	Iowa Hawkeyes
AT-L	Jessica Mendoza	JR.	Stanford Cardinal
AT-L	Veronica Nelson	SO.	California Golden Bears
AT-L	Jenny Topping	SO.	Cal State Fullerton Titans

Second Team

Position	Player	Class	School
P	Jocelyn Forest	JR.	California Golden Bears
P	Shelley Laird	JR.	Alabama Crimson Tide
P	Nicole Myers	JR.	FAU Owls
C	Ashli Barrett	SR.	Oklahoma Sooners
1B	Lisa Carey	SR.	Oklahoma Sooners
2B	Keisha Shepperson	SR.	East Carolina Pirates
3B	Tairia Flowers	SO.	UCLA Bruins
SS	Alana Addison	JR.	ULL Rajin' Cajuns
OF	Sara Carlson	SO.	Villanova Wildcats
OF	Jackie McClain	FR.	Alabama Crimson Tide
OF	Melissa Taylor	SR.	Michigan Wolverines
DP	Kristen Dennis	JR.	Virginia Cavaliers
UT	Sarah Martz	FR.	DePaul Blue Demons
AT-L	Amanda Freed	JR.	UCLA Bruins
AT-L	Ashley Moore	JR.	Auburn Tigers
AT-L	Amanda Renfroe	SR.	Texas Tech Red Raiders
AT-L	Kristin Schmidt	FR.	Notre Dame Fighting Irish
AT-L	Karen Williams	SR.	Missouri Tigers

Third Team

Position	Player	Class	School
P	Tia Bollinger	SO.	Washington Huskies
P	Jessica Chase	JR.	Texas State Bobcats
P	Leslie Malerich	JR.	FSU Seminoles
C	Stefanie Christoferson	SR.	UIC Flames
1B	Alicia Gerlach	JR.	Iowa Hawkeyes
2B	Suzanne Olcott	JR.	Alabama Crimson Tide
3B	Becky McMurtry	SO.	Illinois State Redbirds
SS	Jaime Clark	SO.	Washington Huskies
OF	Deanna Dovak	JR.	Rider Broncs
OF	Kelly Hauxhurst	SR.	Washington Huskies
OF	Jenny Kriech	JR.	Notre Dame Fighting Irish
DP	Melanie Fisher	SO.	Missouri Tigers
UT	Erin Stremsterfer	SR.	Southern Illinois Salukis
AT-L	Cindy Ball	JR.	Pacific Tigers
AT-L	Nicole Giordano	SR.	Arizona Wildcats
AT-L	Jarrah Myers	JR.	Notre Dame Fighting Irish
AT-L	Marci Ridenbaugh	FR.	Kent State Golden Flashes
AT-L	Jennifer Sharron	SR.	Notre Dame Fighting Irish
AT-L	Jennifer Stewart	JR.	Oklahoma Sooners
