= Saint Peter's Peacocks softball =

College softball team

- University: Saint Peter's University
- Head coach: Alyssa Ruiz (2nd season)
- Conference: MAAC
- Location: Jersey City, New Jersey
- Home stadium: Joseph J. Jaroschak Field
- Nickname: Peacocks
- Colors: Blue and white

NCAA Tournament appearances
- 2001

Conference tournament championships
- 2001

Regular-season conference championships
- 1996, 2000

The Saint Peter's Peacocks softball team represents Saint Peter's University in the NCAA Division I college softball. The team participates in the Metro Atlantic Athletic Conference (MAAC). The Peacocks are currently led by head coach Alyssa Ruiz. The team plays its home games at Joseph J. Jaroschak Field located in Lincoln Park in Jersey City, New Jersey.

== History ==
Since joining the conference in 1981, Saint Peter's has won the MAAC regular season championship twice, doing so in 1996 in a tie with the Canisius Golden Griffins and in 2000. The Peacocks won the MAAC tournament championship in 2001, clinching a berth in the 2001 NCAA Division I softball tournament after defeating the Marist Red Foxes 2–0.

In their first appearance in the NCAA tournament, the Peacocks faced off against Arizona. The Peacocks attempted a late-game comeback, scoring two runs in the top of the seventh inning, but were defeated by a score of 4–2. The Wildcats, led by star pitcher Jennie Finch, would end up winning the 2001 Women's College World Series. Saint Peter's were eliminated from the tournament by Texas Tech, losing in a 3–2 contest.

=== Coaching history ===
| Years | Coach | Record | % |
|---|---|---|---|
| 1978–1984 | Pat Longo | 58–54 | .518 |
| 1985–1986 | Karen Karosy | 12–43 | .218 |
| 1987–1990 | Patrick Ciriello | 27–83 | .245 |
| 1991–1993 | Janice Higgins | 40–67 | .374 |
| 1994 | Joe Botti | 1–5 | .167 |
| 1994 | Vicki Morrow | 5–24–1 | .183 |
| 1995–1997 | Rich Gilberto | 81–58–2 | .582 |
| 1998–2003 | Ron DeRogitis | 174–97–2 | .641 |
| 2003 | Tim Camp | 18–12 | .600 |
| 2004–2006 | Jeff Horohonich | 49–79 | .383 |
| 2007–2008 | Mike Pelegrino | 28–61 | .315 |
| 2009 | Donna Barrone | 10–24 | .294 |
| 2010 | Dan Drutz | 2–36 | .053 |
| 2011–2016 | Ranae Bar | 29–249 | .104 |
| 2017–2024 | Chris Stelma | 96–248 | .279 |
| 2025–present | Alyssa Ruiz | 20–79 | .202 |

== Roster ==
2023 Saint Peter's Peacocks roster
| Pitchers: 0 – Kristen Brennan – Senior; 27 – Christina Colon – Senior; 42 – Sydney Palmer – Freshman; 92 – Dakota Pitts – Sophomore; 34 – Sydney Senerchia – Graduate Student; 20 – Kasidy Slusser – Sophomore; 19 – Sophie Wilson – Senior; Catchers: 99 – Brandi Feeney – Senior; 9 – Kourtney Ketcham – Junior; 14 – Maiah Skakal – Junior | Infielders: 17 – Courtney Fraher – Senior; 7 – Aubrey Ketcham – Senior; 12 – Cara McNulty – Senior; 26 – Kaitlynn Peters – Junior; 1 – Katie Sciglimpaglia – Graduate Student; 86 – Tai Turner – Freshman; Outfielders: 66 – Isabella Chugranis – Freshman; 31 – Anja Solveig Kane – Graduate Student; 23 – Kaylee Lacomb – Freshman; 4 – Samantha Miller – Senior; Utility: 24 – Jess Forte – Sophomore |

== Season-by-season results ==
Record table
| Season | Coach | Overall | Conference | Standing | Postseason |
|---|---|---|---|---|---|
Saint Peter's Peacocks (AIAW) (1978–1980)
| 1978 | Pat Longo | 10–2 | | | |
| 1979 | Pat Longo | 12–3 | | | |
| 1980 | Pat Longo | 11–4 | | | |
Saint Peter's Peacocks (Metro Atlantic Athletic Conference) (1981–present)
| 1981 | Pat Longo | 14–4 | | | |
| 1982 | Pat Longo | 7–9 | | | |
| 1983 | Pat Longo | 1–16 | | | |
| 1984 | Pat Longo | 3–16 | | | |
| 1985 | Karen Karosy | 6–23 | | | |
| 1986 | Karen Karosy | 6–20 | | | |
| 1987 | Patrick Ciriello | 11–16 | 3–10 | 8th | |
| 1988 | Patrick Ciriello | 8–22 | 7–8 | 6th | |
| 1989 | Patrick Ciriello | 3–22 | 3–14 | 8th | |
| 1990 | Patrick Ciriello | 5–23 | 2–12 | 10th | |
| 1991 | Janice Higgins | 7–26 | 3–13 | 8th | |
| 1992 | Janice Higgins | 18–20 | 5–11 | 3rd | |
| 1993 | Janice Higgins | 15–21 | 9–19 | 4th | |
| 1994 | Joe Botti/Vicki Morrow | 6–29–1 | 8–16 | | |
| 1995 | Rich Gilberto | 19–22–1 | 5–7 | | |
| 1996 | Rich Gilberto | 30–20 | 11–1 | T–1st | |
| 1997 | Rich Gilberto | 32–16–1 | 7–4–1 | 3rd | |
| 1998 | Ron DeRogitis | 32–12–1 | 12–3–1 | 4th | |
| 1999 | Ron DeRogitis | 31–20 | 12–4 | 2nd | |
| 2000 | Ron DeRogitis | 32–19–1 | 12–4 | 1st | |
| 2001 | Ron DeRogitis | 42–19 | 10–6 | 4th | NCAA Regionals |
| 2002 | Ron DeRogitis | 30–21 | 11–5 | 3rd | |
| 2003 | Ron DeRogitis/Tim Camp | 24–18 | 11–5 | T–2nd | |
| 2004 | Jeff Horohonich | 11–22 | 5–11 | T–7th | |
| 2005 | Jeff Horohonich | 15–33 | 3–12 | 8th | |
| 2006 | Jeff Horohonich | 23–24–1 | 5–11 | T–8th | |
| 2007 | Mike Pelegrino | 22–23 | 11–5 | 2nd | |
| 2008 | Mike Pelegrino | 6–38 | 5–11 | T–7th | |
| 2009 | Donna Barrone | 10–24 | 2–12 | 9th | |
| 2010 | Dan Drutz | 2–34 | 0–16 | 9th | |
| 2011 | Ranae Bart | 3–35 | 1–15 | 9th | |
| 2012 | Ranae Bart | 5–44 | 1–15 | 9th | |
| 2013 | Ranae Bart | 9–44 | 2–14 | 9th | |
| 2014 | Ranae Bart | 10–42 | 4–16 | T–10th | |
| 2015 | Ranae Bart | 2–40 | 1–19 | 11th | |
| 2016 | Ranae Bart | 1–42 | 1–19 | 11th | |
| 2017 | Chris Stelma | 6–34 | 4–16 | 10th | |
| 2018 | Chris Stelma | 7–41 | 0–20 | 11th | |
| 2019 | Chris Stelma | 9–47 | 2–18 | 11th | |
| 2020 | Chris Stelma | 4–10 | 0–0 | N/A | Season cut short due to COVID-19 pandemic |
| 2021 | Chris Stelma | 2–28 | 2–28 | 11th | |
| 2022 | Chris Stelma | 22–33 | 7–13 | 9th | |
| 2023 | Chris Stelma | 30–21 | 9–11 | T–7th | |
| 2024 | Chris Stelma | 16–34 | 6–18 | 11th | |
| 2025 | Alyssa Ruiz | 13–35 | 4–22 | 13th | |
| 2026 | Alyssa Ruiz | 7–44 | 3–25 | 13th | |
| Total: | | 580–1,122–5 (.341) | | | |
National champion Postseason invitational champion Conference regular season champion Conference regular season and conference tournament champion Division regular season champion Division regular season and conference tournament champion Conference tournament champion

== See also ==
- List of NCAA Division I softball programs
