= 2001 Arizona Wildcats softball team =

American college softball season

2001 Arizona Wildcats softball

National Champion NCAA Tucson Regional champion Pac-10 champion
- Conference: Pacific-10 Conference
- Record: 65–4 (19–2 Pac-10)
- Head coach: Mike Candrea (17th season)
- Home stadium: Rita Hillenbrand Memorial Stadium

2001 Pacific-10 Conference softball standings
	Conf.						Overall
Team	W		L		T	PCT	W		L		T	PCT
No. 1 Arizona ‍†‍‍^{y}	19	–	2	–	0	.905	65	–	4	–	0	.942
No. 2 UCLA ‍‍‍^{y}	16	–	5	–	0	.762	62	–	6	–	0	.912
No. 3 Stanford ‍‍‍^{y}	11	–	10	–	0	.524	54	–	16	–	1	.768
No. 13 Washington ‍‍‍^{y}	11	–	10	–	0	.524	40	–	23	–	0	.635
No. 20 Oregon State ‍‍‍^{y}	10	–	10	–	0	.500	44	–	24	–	1	.645
No. 9 Arizona State ‍‍‍^{y}	9	–	12	–	0	.429	36	–	22	–	0	.621
No. 6 California ‍‍‍^{y}	6	–	14	–	0	.300	54	–	18	–	0	.750
Oregon ‍‍‍	1	–	20	–	0	.048	28	–	40	–	0	.412
† – Conference champion y – Invited to the NCAA tournament As of May 31, 2001; Rankings from NFCA/USA Today

The 2001 Arizona Wildcats softball team represented the University of Arizona in the 2001 NCAA Division I softball season. The Wildcats were coached by Mike Candrea, who led his seventeenth season. The Wildcats finished with a record of 65–4. They played their home games at Rita Hillenbrand Memorial Stadium and competed in the Pacific-10 Conference, where they finished first with a 19–2 record.

The Wildcats were invited to the 2001 NCAA Division I softball tournament, where they swept the West Regional and then completed a run through the Women's College World Series to claim their sixth NCAA Women's College World Series Championship.

== Roster ==
2001 Arizona Wildcats roster
Pitchers: 0 – Becky Lemke – senior; 2 – Teresa Demeter – senior; 15 – Jenny Gladding – freshman; 27 – Jennie Finch – junior; 31 – Kim Balkan – freshman; Catchers: 42 – Lindsey Collins – senior; 52 – Mackenzie Vandergeest – freshman	Infielders: 8 – Lisha Ribellia – sophomore; 9 – Leneah Manuma – freshman; 20 – Candace Abrams – freshman; 24 – Lauren Bauer – senior; 25 – Allison Andrade – senior; 32 – Toni Mascarenas – senior	Outfielders: 4 – Nicole Giordano – senior; 7 – Erika Hanson – senior

== Schedule ==
Legend
	Arizona win
	Arizona loss
*	Non-Conference game

2001 Arizona Wildcats softball game log
Regular season

February
Date	Opponent	Rank	Site/stadium	Score	Overall record	Pac-10 record
Feb 2	vs Florida Atlantic*	No. 3	USF Softball Stadium • Tampa, FL	W 5–0	1–0	
Feb 2	vs Tennessee*	No. 3	USF Softball Stadium • Tampa, FL	W 8–0^{5}	2–0	
Feb 3	vs Northwestern*	No. 3	USF Softball Stadium • Tampa, FL	W 6–0	3–0	
Feb 3	at South Florida*	No. 3	USF Softball Stadium • Tampa, FL	W 5–0	4–0	
Feb 9	vs Georgia*	No. 3	Alberta B. Farrington Softball Stadium • Tempe, AZ	W 8–0	5–0	
Feb 9	vs No. 24 Texas*	No. 3	Alberta B. Farrington Softball Stadium • Tempe, AZ	W 14–0	6–0	
Feb 10	vs No. 8 LSU*	No. 3	Alberta B. Farrington Softball Stadium • Tempe, AZ	W 10–0	7–0	
Feb 10	vs No. 12 Nebraska*	No. 3	Alberta B. Farrington Softball Stadium • Tempe, AZ	W 11–4	8–0	
Feb 11	vs No. 18 South Carolina*	No. 3	Alberta B. Farrington Softball Stadium • Tempe, AZ	W 8–0	9–0	
Feb 11	vs Missouri*	No. 3	Alberta B. Farrington Softball Stadium • Tempe, AZ	W 8–0	10–0	
Feb 16	Bowling Green*	No. 3	Rita Hillenbrand Memorial Stadium • Tucson, AZ	W 29–0^{5}	11–0	
Feb 16	Oklahoma State*	No. 3	Rita Hillenbrand Memorial Stadium • Tucson, AZ	W 7–0	12–0	
Feb 17	Kentucky*	No. 3	Rita Hillenbrand Memorial Stadium • Tucson, AZ	W 12–1^{5}	13–0	
Feb 17	New Mexico State*	No. 3	Rita Hillenbrand Memorial Stadium • Tucson, AZ	W 9–1^{6}	14–0	
Feb 18	Pacific*	No. 3	Rita Hillenbrand Memorial Stadium • Tucson, AZ	W 9–0^{5}	15–0	
Feb 23	Drake*	No. 2	Rita Hillenbrand Memorial Stadium • Tucson, AZ	W 5–0	16–0	
Feb 23	Connecticut*	No. 2	Rita Hillenbrand Memorial Stadium • Tucson, AZ	W 11–3^{5}	17–0	
Feb 24	McNeese State*	No. 2	Rita Hillenbrand Memorial Stadium • Tucson, AZ	W 13–1^{5}	18–0	
Feb 24	Southern Utah*	No. 2	Rita Hillenbrand Memorial Stadium • Tucson, AZ	W 8–0^{5}	19–0	
Feb 25	Florida*	No. 2	Rita Hillenbrand Memorial Stadium • Tucson, AZ	W 5–0	20–0	
Feb 27	Western Michigan*	No. 2	Rita Hillenbrand Memorial Stadium • Tucson, AZ	W 10–0^{5}	21–0	
Feb 28	Western Michigan*	No. 2	Rita Hillenbrand Memorial Stadium • Tucson, AZ	W 9–0^{5}	22–0	

March
Date	Opponent	Rank	Site/stadium	Score	Overall record	Pac-10 record
Mar 2	No. 23 Baylor*	No. 2	Rita Hillenbrand Memorial Stadium • Tucson, AZ	W 8–0^{5}	23–0	
Mar 2	Creighton*	No. 2	Rita Hillenbrand Memorial Stadium • Tucson, AZ	W 9–0^{6}	24–0	
Mar 3	Indiana State*	No. 2	Rita Hillenbrand Memorial Stadium • Tucson, AZ	W 12–0^{5}	25–0	
Mar 3	Western Michigan*	No. 2	Rita Hillenbrand Memorial Stadium • Tucson, AZ	W 12–0^{5}	26–0	
Mar 3	No. 5 Oklahoma*	No. 2	Rita Hillenbrand Memorial Stadium • Tucson, AZ	W 6–2	27–0	
Mar 6	Creighton*	No. 2	Rita Hillenbrand Memorial Stadium • Tucson, AZ	W 3–0	28–0	
Mar 13	at San Diego*	No. 2	San Diego, CA	W 9–0^{5}	29–0	
Mar 13	at San Diego*	No. 2	San Diego, CA	W 8–0^{6}	30–0	
Mar 14	at San Diego State*	No. 2	San Diego, CA	W 3–0	31–0	
Mar 15	vs Louisiana–Lafayette*	No. 2	Titan Softball Complex • Fullerton, CA	L 3–4	31–1	
Mar 15	vs UNLV*	No. 2	Titan Softball Complex • Fullerton, CA	W 10–0^{5}	32–1	
Mar 16	vs Cal State Northridge*	No. 2	Titan Softball Complex • Fullerton, CA	W 6–0	33–1	
Mar 17	vs Texas*	No. 2	Titan Softball Complex • Fullerton, CA	L 1–2	33–2	
Mar 17	vs North Carolina*	No. 2	Titan Softball Complex • Fullerton, CA	W 6–1	34–2	
Mar 23	Utah*	No. 2	Rita Hillenbrand Memorial Stadium • Tucson, AZ	W 8–3	35–2	
Mar 24	Utah*	No. 2	Rita Hillenbrand Memorial Stadium • Tucson, AZ	W 10–2^{6}	36–2	
Mar 30	at Oregon	No. 2	Howe Field • Eugene, OR	W 11–1	37–2	1–0

April
Date	Opponent	Rank	Site/stadium	Score	Overall record	Pac-10 record
Apr 1	at No. 15 Oregon State	No. 2	Oregon State Softball Complex • Corvallis, OR	W 5–0	38–2	2–0
Apr 6	at No. 14 Washington	No. 2	Husky Softball Stadium • Seattle, WA	L 0–1	38–3	2–1
Apr 7	at No. 1 UCLA	No. 2	Easton Stadium • Los Angeles, CA	W 4–0	39–3	3–1
Apr 8	at No. 1 UCLA	No. 2	Easton Stadium • Los Angeles, CA	L 0–3	39–4	3–2
Apr 13	No. 8 Arizona State	No. 2	Rita Hillenbrand Memorial Stadium • Tucson, AZ	W 3–0^{11}	40–4	4–2
Apr 14	No. 8 Arizona State	No. 2	Rita Hillenbrand Memorial Stadium • Tucson, AZ	W 4–3^{9}	41–4	5–2
Apr 18	No. 15 Fresno State*	No. 2	Rita Hillenbrand Memorial Stadium • Tucson, AZ	W 9–1	42–4	
Apr 18	No. 15 Fresno State*	No. 2	Rita Hillenbrand Memorial Stadium • Tucson, AZ	W 8–7	43–4	
Apr 20	No. 3 Stanford	No. 2	Rita Hillenbrand Memorial Stadium • Tucson, AZ	W 7–0	44–4	6–2
Apr 22	No. 4 California	No. 2	Rita Hillenbrand Memorial Stadium • Tucson, AZ	W 2–1^{8}	45–4	7–2
Apr 22	No. 4 California	No. 2	Rita Hillenbrand Memorial Stadium • Tucson, AZ	W 2–1	46–4	8–2
Apr 25	at No. 9 Arizona State	No. 1	Alberta B. Farrington Softball Stadium • Tempe, AZ	W 5–0	47–4	9–2
Apr 27	No. 14 Oregon State	No. 1	Rita Hillenbrand Memorial Stadium • Tucson, AZ	W 1–0	48–4	10–2
Apr 27	No. 14 Oregon State	No. 1	Rita Hillenbrand Memorial Stadium • Tucson, AZ	W 7–1	49–4	11–2
Apr 28	Oregon	No. 1	Rita Hillenbrand Memorial Stadium • Tucson, AZ	W 8–0^{6}	50–4	12–2
Apr 29	Oregon	No. 1	Rita Hillenbrand Memorial Stadium • Tucson, AZ	W 6–1	51–4	13–2

May
Date	Opponent	Rank	Site/stadium	Score	Overall record	Pac-10 record
May 4	at No. 5 California	No. 1	Levine-Fricke Field • Berkeley, CA	W 5–0	52–4	14–2
May 5	at No. 3 Stanford	No. 1	Boyd & Jill Smith Family Stadium • Stanford, CA	W 8–1	53–4	15–2
May 6	at No. 3 Stanford	No. 1	Boyd & Jill Smith Family Stadium • Stanford, CA	W 5–3^{15}	54–4	16–2
May 11	No. 2 UCLA	No. 1	Rita Hillenbrand Memorial Stadium • Tucson, AZ	W 4–0	55–4	17–2
May 12	No. 12 Washington	No. 1	Rita Hillenbrand Memorial Stadium • Tucson, AZ	W 5–1	56–4	18–2
May 12	No. 12 Washington	No. 1	Rita Hillenbrand Memorial Stadium • Tucson, AZ	W 9–0^{5}	57–4	19–2

Postseason

NCAA Tucson Regional
Date	Opponent	Rank	Site/stadium	Score	Overall record	NCAAT record
May 17	Saint Peter's	No. 1	Rita Hillenbrand Memorial Stadium • Tucson, AZ	W 4–2	58–4	1–0
May 18	Texas Tech	No. 1	Rita Hillenbrand Memorial Stadium • Tucson, AZ	W 8–0^{6}	59–4	2–0
May 19	No. 10 Cal State Fullerton	No. 1	Rita Hillenbrand Memorial Stadium • Tucson, AZ	W 5–4	60–4	3–0
May 20	No. 19 Southwest Texas State	No. 1	Rita Hillenbrand Memorial Stadium • Tucson, AZ	W 6–2	61–4	4–0

NCAA Women's College World Series
Date	Opponent	Rank (Seed)	Site/stadium	Score	Overall record	WCWS Record
May 24	(8) California	No. 1 (1)	ASA Hall of Fame Stadium • Oklahoma City, OK	W 3–2	62–4	1–0
May 25	(5) Oklahoma	No. 1 (1)	ASA Hall of Fame Stadium • Oklahoma City, OK	W 5–4	63–4	2–0
May 27	(4) Stanford	No. 1 (1)	ASA Hall of Fame Stadium • Oklahoma City, OK	W 1–0	64–4	3–0
May 28	(2) UCLA	No. 1 (1)	ASA Hall of Fame Stadium • Oklahoma City, OK	W 1–0	65–4	4–0

== Ranking movements ==
Ranking movements Legend: ██ Increase in ranking ██ Decrease in ranking
	Week													
Poll	Pre	1	2	3	4	5	6	7	8	9	10	11	12	Final
NFCA/USA Today	3	2	2	2	2	2	2	2	2	2	1	1	1	1
