= 2001 Big Ten softball tournament =

College softball tournament in Michigan

- Teams: 6
- Format: Double-elimination
- Finals site: Alumni Field; Ann Arbor, Michigan
- Champions: Iowa (1st title)
- Runner-up: Michigan (8th title game)
- Winning coach: Gayle Blevins (1st title)

2001 Big Ten Conference softball standings
	Conf.						Overall
Team	W		L		T	PCT	W		L		T	PCT
No. 8 Michigan ‍†‍‍^{y}	17	–	3	–	0	.850	43	–	17	–	1	.713
No. 7 Iowa ‍‍‡‍^{y}	16	–	4	–	0	.800	49	–	14	–	0	.778
Ohio State ‍‍‍	14	–	6	–	0	.700	46	–	18	–	0	.719
Illinois ‍‍‍	12	–	8	–	0	.600	49	–	23	–	0	.681
Penn State ‍‍‍^{y}	9	–	11	–	0	.450	36	–	26	–	0	.581
Wisconsin ‍‍‍^{y}	9	–	11	–	0	.450	33	–	27	–	0	.550
Purdue ‍‍‍	9	–	11	–	0	.450	34	–	24	–	1	.585
Northwestern ‍‍‍	8	–	12	–	0	.400	13	–	18	–	0	.419
Minnesota ‍‍‍	7	–	13	–	0	.350	36	–	22	–	1	.619
Michigan State ‍‍‍	5	–	15	–	0	.250	21	–	39	–	0	.350
Indiana ‍‍‍	4	–	16	–	0	.200	16	–	36	–	0	.308
† – Conference champion ‡ – Tournament champion y – Invited to the NCAA tournament As of June 2001; Rankings from NFCA/USA Today

The 2001 Big Ten softball tournament was held at Alumni Field on the campus of the University of Michigan in Ann Arbor, Michigan. As the tournament winner, Iowa earned the Big Ten Conference's automatic bid to the 2001 NCAA Division I softball tournament.

== Format and seeding ==
The 2001 tournament was a six team double-elimination tournament. The top six teams based on conference regular season winning percentage earned invites to the tournament. This was the first tournament that Illinois participated in, as it was also the first season for the Illinois softball team competing at the varsity level in the Big Ten.

== Tournament ==
First round
4	Illinois	1
5	Penn State	6
3	Ohio State	1
6	Wisconsin	2
4	Illinois	3
6	Wisconsin	0
5	Penn State	5
3	Ohio State	4

Second round
1	Michigan	2
5	Penn State	0
2	Iowa	8
6	Wisconsin	0
4	Illinois	4
5	Penn State	1

Semi-Finals
1	Michigan	6
2	Iowa	1
2	Iowa	11
4	Illinois	2

Finals
1	Michigan	1
2	Iowa	2
