= 2012 Southland Conference softball tournament =

- Teams: 6
- Format: Double-elimination tournament
- Finals site: Roadrunner Field; San Antonio, Texas
- Champions: Texas State (6th title)
- Winning coach: Ricci Woodard (4th title)
- MVP: Chandler Hall (Texas State)
- Television: ESPN3

The 2012 Southland Conference tournament was held at Roadrunner Field on the campus of the University of Texas at San Antonio in San Antonio, Texas, from May 11 through 13, 2012 after heavy rainfall in the San Antonio area forced a postponement of the tournament start. The tournament winner, Texas State Bobcats, earned the Southland Conference's automatic bid to the 2012 NCAA Division I softball tournament. The Championship game was broadcast on ESPN3 with the remainder of the tournament streaming on SLC NOW. The championship game was called by Lincoln Rose and Chris Mycoskie.

== Format ==
The top 6 teams qualified for the Southland softball tournament. The tournament was played in a double-elimination format with a maximum of eleven games.

2012 Southland Conference softball standings
	Conf.						Overall
Team	W		L		PCT		W	L		PCT
Texas State **‡ ‍‍‍	18	–	2	–	0	.900		39	–	17	–	0	.696
Sam Houston ‍‍‍	14	–	6	–	0	.700		29	–	21	–	0	.580
Central Arkansas ‍‍‍	12	–	8	–	0	.600		36	–	22	–	0	.621
McNeese State ‍‍‍	12	–	8	–	0	.600		34	–	21	–	0	.618
Texas–San Antonio ‍‍‍	12	–	8	–	0	.600		24	–	28	–	0	.462
Texas A&M–Corpus Christi ‍‍‍	11	–	9	–	0	.550		18	–	23	–	0	.439
Nicholls ‍‍‍	8	–	12	–	0	.400		14	–	31	–	0	.311
Northwestern State ‍‍‍	7	–	13	–	0	.350		19	–	31	–	0	.380
Stephen F. Austin ‍‍‍	6	–	14	–	0	.300		16	–	33	–	0	.327
Texas–Arlington ‍‍‍	5	–	15	–	0	.250		15	–	27	–	0	.357
Southeastern Louisiana ‍‍‍	5	–	15	–	0	.250		15	–	34	–	0	.306
‡ – SLC Tournament Champion; **Southland Tournament #1 seed champion As of May 20, 2012; Rankings from USA Today/NFCA Coaches

== Tournament ==
Upper round 1
4	UTSA	4
5	Central Arkansas	3
3	McNeese State	11
6	Texas A&M-Corpus Christi	3
Lower round 1
1	Texas State	2
4	UTSA	1
2	Sam Houston State	1
3	McNeese State	6

Upper round 2
4	UTSA	1
6	Texas A&M-Corpus Christi	2
2	Sam Houston State	1
5	Central Arkansas	0
Lower round 2
1	Texas State	5
3	McNeese State	2

Upper final
2	Sam Houston State	2
6	Texas A&M-Corpus Christi	0
Lower final
2	Sam Houston State	3
3	McNeese State	2

Final
1	Texas State	3
2	Sam Houston State	0

- All times listed are Central Daylight Time.

== Line Scores ==
=== Day One ===
==== Game 1 (Central Arkansas vs UTSA) ====
May 11, 2012 11:03 am CDT at Roadrunner Field, San Antonio, Texas
Team	1	2	3	4	5	6	7	R	H	E
Central Arkansas	0	0	0	2	1	0	0	3	6	0
UTSA	1	0	2	1	0	0	0	4	10	1
WP: Staton (15–7) LP: Armstrong, K. (22–14) Sv: None

==== Game 2 (Texas A&M-Corpus Christi vs McNeese State) ====
May 11, 2012 1:30 pm CDT at Roadrunner Field, San Antonio, Texas
Team	1	2	3	4	5	6	R	H	E
Texas A&M-Corpus Christi	0	0	2	0	1	0	3	7	4
McNeese State	2	2	2	2	0	3	11	14	3
WP: Denham, T. (14–10) LP: Cecchetti, G. (10–7) Sv: None; Notes: Game #2 of 2012 Southland Conference Tournament Game called in bottom of sixth due to Southland Conference run rule

==== Game 3 (UTSA vs Texas State) ====
May 11, 2012 4:03 pm CDT at Roadrunner Field, San Antonio, Texas
Team	1	2	3	4	5	6	7	R	H	E
UTSA	0	0	1	0	0	0	0	1	4	0
Texas State	0	0	0	0	2	0	0	2	5	0
WP: Hall, C. (21–6) LP: Staton (15–8) Sv: None; Attendance: 362

==== Game 4 (McNeese State vs Sam Houston State) ====
May 11, 2012 6:26 pm CDT at Roadrunner Field, San Antonio, Texas
Team	1	2	3	4	5	6	7	R	H	E
McNeese State	0	0	0	0	0	5	1	6	7	0
Sam Houston State	0	0	0	0	0	0	1	1	5	0
WP: Lilly, B. (4–1) LP: Garrison, T. (10–9) Sv: None; Attendance: 409; Notes: Game #4 of 2012 Southland Conference Tournament Game was delayed due to lightning at 7:10 pm, which was followed by rain and it was suspended at 9:03 pm due to unplayable field conditions Game resumed at 9:54 am on Saturday

=== Day Two ===
==== Game 5 (UTSA vs Texas A&M-Corpus Christi) ====
May 12, 2012 11:29 am CDT at Roadrunner Field, San Antonio, Texas
Team	1	2	3	4	5	6	7	R	H	E
UTSA	0	0	1	0	0	0	0	1	6	1
Texas A&M-Corpus Christi	0	0	0	0	0	0	2	2	8	0
WP: Cecchetti, G. (11–7) LP: Vordenbaum (4–11) Sv: None; Notes: Game #5 of 2012 Southland Conference Tournament UTSA eliminated from tournament Pesina, V. faced 1 batter in the 6th.

==== Game 6 (Sam Houston State vs Central Arkansas) ====
May 12, 2012 2:14 pm CDT at Roadrunner Field, San Antonio, Texas
Team	1	2	3	4	5	6	7	R	H	E
Sam Houston State	0	0	0	0	0	0	1	1	9	0
Central Arkansas	0	0	0	0	0	0	0	0	1	2
WP: Lancaster, S. (12–7) LP: Armstrong, K. (22–15) Sv: None; Notes: Game #6 of 2012 Southland Conference Tournament Central Arkansas eliminated from tournament

==== Game 7 (Texas State vs McNeese State) ====
May 12, 2012 4:29 pm CDT at Roadrunner Field, San Antonio, Texas
Team	1	2	3	4	5	6	7	R	H	E
Texas State	0	2	0	0	0	1	2	5	12	0
McNeese State	1	0	0	0	1	0	0	2	4	0
WP: Taylor, A. (16–8) LP: Denham, T. (14–11) Sv: None; Attendance: 430; Notes: Game #7 of the 2012 Southland Conference Tournament Texas State advances to Sunday's championship game

==== Semi-final Game One (Texas A&M-Corpus Christi vs Sam Houston State) ====
May 12, 2012 7:00 pm CDT at Roadrunner Field, San Antonio, Texas
Team	1	2	3	4	5	6	7	R	H	E
Texas A&M-Corpus Christi	0	0	0	0	0	0	0	0	4	0
Sam Houston State	0	0	0	0	2	0	0	2	5	0
WP: Garrison, T. (11–9) LP: Cecchetti, G. (11–8) Sv: None; Attendance: 430

==== Semi-final Game Two (Sam Houston State vs McNeese State) ====
May 12, 2012 9:23 pm CDT at Roadrunner Field, San Antonio, Texas
Team	1	2	3	4	5	6	7	8	9	R	H	E
Sam Houston State	0	0	0	2	0	0	0	0	1	3	12	0
McNeese State	0	0	0	0	0	1	1	0	0	2	9	0
WP: Garrison, T. (12–9) LP: Denham, T. (14–12) Sv: None; Attendance: 430; Notes: Game #9 of the 2012 Southland Conference Tournament Sam Houston State advances to Sunday's championship Lilly, B. faced 2 batters in the 4th.

=== Day Three ===
==== Championship Game (Sam Houston State vs Texas State) ====
May 13, 2012 11:06 am CDT at Roadrunner Field, San Antonio, Texas
Team	1	2	3	4	5	6	7	R	H	E
Sam Houston State	0	0	0	0	0	0	0	0	0	2
Texas State	1	0	0	2	0	0	0	3	7	1
WP: Hall, C. (22–6) LP: Lancaster, S. (12–8) Sv: None; Attendance: 256; Notes: Texas State wins its sixth all-time Southland Tournament Championship Texas State RHP Chandler Hall throws third career no-hitter. Lancaster, S faced 1 batter in the 5th.

== Awards and honors ==
Tournament MVP: Chander Hall - Texas State

All-Tournament Teams:

- Caitlyn Ivy - UTSA
- Anna Hernandez - Texas State
- Shelby Carnline - Texas State
- Katie Roux - McNeese State
- Ashley Isbell - Sam Houston State
- Kim Damian - Sam Houston State
- Coralee Ramirez - Texas State
- Brooke Baker - Texas State
- Claire Terracina - McNeese State
- Tomi Garrison - Sam Houston State
- Chandler Hall - Texas State

== See also ==
2012 Southland Conference baseball tournament
