= 2012 Southland Conference baseball tournament =

- Teams: 8
- Format: Double-elimination
- Finals site: Bobcat Ballpark; San Marcos, TX
- Champions: Texas–Arlington (3rd title)
- Winning coach: Darin Thomas (1st title)
- MVP: Travis Sibley (Texas–Arlington)

2012 Southland Conference baseball standings
	Conf.				Overall
Team	W		L	PCT	W		L	PCT
Sam Houston State ‍†‍‍^{y}	24	–	9	.727	40	–	22	.645
Southeastern Louisiana ‍‍‍	20	–	13	.606	39	–	21	.650
Texas–Arlington ‍‍‡‍^{y}	19	–	14	.576	36	–	25	.590
Texas State ‍‍‍	19	–	14	.576	32	–	24	.571
McNeese State ‍‍‍	17	–	16	.515	24	–	30	.444
Central Arkansas ‍‍‍	16	–	17	.485	25	–	30	.455
Stephen F. Austin ‍‍‍	16	–	17	.485	26	–	33	.441
Lamar ‍‍‍	14	–	19	.424	22	–	30	.423
Texas A&M–Corpus Christi ‍‍‍	14	–	19	.424	24	–	33	.421
Northwestern State ‍‍‍	14	–	19	.424	19	–	32	.373
Nicholls State ‍‍‍	13	–	19	.406	26	–	28	.481
UTSA ‍‍‍	11	–	21	.344	22	–	32	.407
† – Conference champion ‡ – Tournament champion y – Invited to the 2012 NCAA Division I baseball tournament As of June 30, 2012; Rankings from Collegiate Baseball

The 2012 Southland Conference baseball tournament took place from May 23 through 26. The top eight regular season finishers of the league's twelve teams met in the double-elimination tournament held at Texas State University–San Marcos's Bobcat Ballpark in San Marcos, Texas. Texas–Arlington won their third Southland Conference Baseball Championship by a score of 13–4 and earned the conference's automatic bid to the 2012 NCAA Division I baseball tournament.

== Seeding and format ==
The top eight finishers from the regular season will be seeded one through eight.

Team	W	L	Pct.	GB	Seed
Sam Houston State	24	9	.727	–	1
Southeastern Louisiana	20	13	.606	4	2
Texas State	19	14	.576	5	3
Texas–Arlington	19	14	.576	5	4
McNeese State	17	16	.515	7	5
Stephen F. Austin	16	17	.485	8	6
Central Arkansas	16	17	.485	8	7
Texas A&M–Corpus Christi	14	19	.424	10	8
Lamar	14	19	.424	10	–
Northwestern State	14	19	.424	10	–
Nicholls State	13	19	.406	10.5	–
UTSA	11	21	.344	12.5	–

== Results ==
First round
1	Sam Houston State	2
8	Texas A&M–Corpus Christi	9
4	Texas–Arlington	6
5	McNeese State	2
1	Sam Houston State	7
5	McNeese State	1
3	Texas State	11
6	Stephen F. Austin	1
2	Southeastern Louisiana	6
7	Central Arkansas	3
6	Stephen F. Austin	7
7	Central Arkansas	2

Second round
4	Texas–Arlington	10
8	Texas A&M–Corpus Christi	5
1	Sam Houston State	4
8	Texas A&M–Corpus Christi	3
2	Southeastern Louisiana	7
3	Texas State	1
3	Texas State	7
6	Stephen F. Austin	9

Semifinals
4	Texas–Arlington	7	—
1	Sam Houston State	6	—
2	Southeastern Louisiana	3	5
6	Stephen F. Austin	4	4

Final
4	Texas–Arlington	13
2	Southeastern Louisiana	4

== All-Tournament Team ==
The following players were named to the All-Tournament Team.

Pos.	Name	School
C	Greg McCall	Texas–Arlington
1B	Bobby Loveless	Stephen F. Austin
2B	Michael Guerra	Texas–Arlington
SS	Hunter Dozier	Stephen F. Austin
3B	Travis Sibley	Texas–Arlington
OF	Jeff McVaney	Texas State
OF	Ladd Rhodes	Southeastern Louisiana
OF	Preston Beck	Texas–Arlington
DH	Max Lamantia	Stephen F. Austin
P	Lance Day	Texas–Arlington
P	Dylan Hills	Southeastern Louisiana

=== Most Valuable Player ===
Travis Sibley was named Tournament Most Valuable Player. Sibley was a third baseman for Texas–Arlington.

== See also ==
- 2012 Southland Conference softball tournament
