= 2009 Southland Conference softball tournament =

- Teams: 6
- Format: Double-elimination tournament
- Finals site: Cowgirl Diamond; Lake Charles, Louisiana
- Champions: Texas State (3rd title)
- Winning coach: Ricci Woodard (2nd title)
- MVP: Chandler Hall (Texas State)

The 2009 Southland Conference tournament was held at Cowgirl Diamond on the campus of McNeese State University in Lake Charles, Louisiana, from May 7 through May 9, 2009. The tournament winner, Texas State, earned the Southland Conference's automatic bid to the 2009 NCAA Division I softball tournament.

== Format ==
The top 6 teams will qualify for the Southland softball tournament. The tournament used a true double-elimination format with a maximum of eleven games.

2009 Southland Conference softball standings
	Conf.						Overall
Team	W		L		PCT		W	L		PCT
Texas State **‡ ‍‍‍	23	–	6	–	0	.793		40	–	18	–	0	.690
McNeese State ‍‍‍	20	–	10	–	0	.667		31	–	28	–	0	.525
Texas–San Antonio ‍‍‍	18	–	11	–	0	.621		29	–	29	–	0	.500
Stephen F. Austin ‍‍‍	17	–	12	–	0	.586		29	–	27	–	0	.518
Texas–Arlington ‍‍‍	17	–	13	–	0	.567		23	–	24	–	0	.489
Sam Houston ‍‍‍	15	–	14	–	0	.517		28	–	26	–	0	.519
Central Arkansas ‍‍‍	14	–	15	–	0	.483		24	–	31	–	0	.436
Nicholls ‍‍‍	14	–	16	–	0	.467		30	–	25	–	0	.545
Texas A&M–Corpus Christi ‍‍‍	12	–	16	–	0	.429		23	–	31	–	0	.426
Southeastern Louisiana ‍‍‍	8	–	22	–	0	.267		20	–	33	–	0	.377
Northwestern State ‍‍‍	3	–	26	–	0	.103		5	–	45	–	0	.100
‡ – SLC Tournament Champion; **Southland Tournament #1 seed champion As of May 22, 2009; Rankings from USA Today/NFCA Coaches

== Tournament ==
Upper round 1
4	Stephen F. Austin	7
5	Texas-Arlington	0
3	UTSA	5
6	Sam Houston State	4
Lower round 1
1	Texas State	3
4	Stephen F. Austin	1
2	McNeese State	4
3	UTSA	3

Upper round 2
4	Stephen F. Austin	1
6	Sam Houston State	2
3	UTSA	12
5	Texas-Arlington	3
Lower round 2
1	Texas State	1
2	McNeese State	0

Upper final
3	UTSA	1
6	Sam Houston State	4
Lower final
2	McNeese State	3
6	Sam Houston State	2

Final
1	Texas State	2
2	McNeese State	1

- All times listed are Central Daylight Time.

== Awards and honors ==
Tournament MVP: Chandler Hall - Texas State

All-Tournament Teams:

- Amber Anderson - UTSA
- Morgan Mikulin - Sam Houston State
- Hailey Wiginton - Sam Houston State
- Bethany Stefinsky - McNeese State
- Lindsey Langner - McNeese State
- Liz Morvant - McNeese State
- Leah Boatwright - Texas State
- Ryan Kos - Texas State
- Taylor Hall - Texas State
- Allyce Rother - Texas State
- Chandler Hall - Texas State (MVP)

== See also ==
2009 Southland Conference baseball tournament
