= 2009 NCAA Division I softball season =

American college softball season

- Defending Champions: Arizona State

Tournament

Women's College World Series
- Champions: Washington (1st title)
- Runners-up: Florida (2nd WCWS Appearance)
- Winning Coach: Heather Tarr (1st title)
- WCWS MOP: Danielle Lawrie (Washington)

Seasons
- ← 2008 2010 →

The 2009 NCAA Division I softball season, play of college softball in the United States organized by the National Collegiate Athletic Association (NCAA) at the Division I level, began in February 2009. The season progressed through the regular season, many conference tournaments and championship series, and concluded with the 2009 NCAA Division I softball tournament and 2009 Women's College World Series. The Women's College World Series, consisting of the eight remaining teams in the NCAA Tournament and held in held in Oklahoma City at ASA Hall of Fame Stadium, ended on June 2, 2009.

== Conference standings ==
2009 Big 12 Conference softball standings
| | Conf. | | | | Overall |
| Team | W | | L | PCT | W | | L | PCT |
|---|---|---|---|---|---|---|---|---|
| No. 16 Oklahoma ‍†‍‡‍^{y} | 14 | – | 4 | .778 | 41 | – | 16 | .719 |
| No. 8 Missouri ‍‍‍^{y} | 12 | – | 6 | .667 | 50 | – | 12 | .806 |
| No. 15 Baylor ‍‍‍^{y} | 11 | – | 7 | .611 | 40 | – | 22 | .645 |
| Texas ‍‍‍^{y} | 11 | – | 7 | .611 | 40 | – | 20 | .667 |
| Nebraska ‍‍‍^{y} | 9 | – | 9 | .500 | 35 | – | 19 | .648 |
| Texas A&M ‍‍‍^{y} | 8 | – | 9 | .471 | 32 | – | 22 | .593 |
| Oklahoma State ‍‍‍^{y} | 8 | – | 10 | .444 | 36 | – | 22 | .621 |
| Iowa State ‍‍‍ | 7 | – | 11 | .389 | 26 | – | 29 | .473 |
| Kansas ‍‍‍ | 6 | – | 11 | .353 | 21 | – | 31 | .404 |
| Texas Tech ‍‍‍ | 3 | – | 15 | .167 | 15 | – | 42 | .263 |
† – Conference champion ‡ – Tournament champion y – Invited to the NCAA tournament Rankings from NFCA

2009 Southland Conference softball standings
| | Conf. | | | | | | Overall |
| Team | W | | L | | PCT | | W | L | | PCT |
|---|---|---|---|---|---|---|---|---|---|---|---|---|---|
| Texas State **‡ ‍‍‍ | 23 | – | 6 | – | 0 | .793 | | 40 | – | 18 | – | 0 | .690 |
| McNeese State ‍‍‍ | 20 | – | 10 | – | 0 | .667 | | 31 | – | 28 | – | 0 | .525 |
| Texas–San Antonio ‍‍‍ | 18 | – | 11 | – | 0 | .621 | | 29 | – | 29 | – | 0 | .500 |
| Stephen F. Austin ‍‍‍ | 17 | – | 12 | – | 0 | .586 | | 29 | – | 27 | – | 0 | .518 |
| Texas–Arlington ‍‍‍ | 17 | – | 13 | – | 0 | .567 | | 23 | – | 24 | – | 0 | .489 |
| Sam Houston ‍‍‍ | 15 | – | 14 | – | 0 | .517 | | 28 | – | 26 | – | 0 | .519 |
| Central Arkansas ‍‍‍ | 14 | – | 15 | – | 0 | .483 | | 24 | – | 31 | – | 0 | .436 |
| Nicholls ‍‍‍ | 14 | – | 16 | – | 0 | .467 | | 30 | – | 25 | – | 0 | .545 |
| Texas A&M–Corpus Christi ‍‍‍ | 12 | – | 16 | – | 0 | .429 | | 23 | – | 31 | – | 0 | .426 |
| Southeastern Louisiana ‍‍‍ | 8 | – | 22 | – | 0 | .267 | | 20 | – | 33 | – | 0 | .377 |
| Northwestern State ‍‍‍ | 3 | – | 26 | – | 0 | .103 | | 5 | – | 45 | – | 0 | .100 |
‡ – SLC Tournament Champion; **Southland Tournament #1 seed champion As of May 22, 2009; Rankings from USA Today/NFCA Coaches

2009 Big Ten Conference softball standings
| | Conf. | | | | Overall |
| Team | W | | L | PCT | W | | L | PCT |
|---|---|---|---|---|---|---|---|---|
| No. 6 Michigan ‍†‍‍^{y} | 17 | – | 3 | .850 | 47 | – | 12 | .797 |
| No. 12 Ohio State ‍‍‍^{y} | 16 | – | 4 | .800 | 47 | – | 11 | .810 |
| No. 18 Northwestern ‍‍‍^{y} | 14 | – | 6 | .700 | 31 | – | 15 | .674 |
| Iowa ‍‍‍^{y} | 13 | – | 7 | .650 | 42 | – | 16 | .724 |
| Illinois ‍‍‍^{y} | 12 | – | 7 | .632 | 29 | – | 17 | .630 |
| Purdue ‍‍‍^{y} | 12 | – | 8 | .600 | 31 | – | 20 | .608 |
| Penn State ‍‍‍ | 7 | – | 13 | .350 | 19 | – | 27 | .413 |
| Minnesota ‍‍‍ | 6 | – | 14 | .300 | 23 | – | 32 | .418 |
| Michigan State ‍‍‍ | 5 | – | 14 | .263 | 21 | – | 28 | .429 |
| Indiana ‍‍‍ | 4 | – | 16 | .200 | 10 | – | 39 | .204 |
| Wisconsin ‍‍‍ | 3 | – | 17 | .150 | 15 | – | 40 | .273 |
† – Conference champion y – Invited to the NCAA tournament As of May 30, 2009; Rankings from NFCA

2009 Sun Belt Conference softball standings
| | Conf. | | | | Overall |
| Team | W | | L | PCT | W | | L | PCT |
|---|---|---|---|---|---|---|---|---|
| No. 25 Louisiana–Lafayette ‍†‍‡‍^{y} | 18 | – | 5 | .783 | 45 | – | 13 | .776 |
| Troy ‍‍‍ | 15 | – | 8 | .652 | 38 | – | 19 | .667 |
| Western Kentucky ‍‍‍ | 14 | – | 9 | .609 | 35 | – | 19 | .648 |
| FIU ‍‍‍ | 13 | – | 11 | .542 | 31 | – | 29 | .517 |
| North Texas ‍‍‍ | 11 | – | 12 | .478 | 26 | – | 28 | .481 |
| South Alabama ‍‍‍ | 10 | – | 12 | .455 | 27 | – | 28 | .491 |
| Florida Atlantic ‍‍‍ | 10 | – | 13 | .435 | 30 | – | 30 | .500 |
| Louisiana–Monroe ‍‍‍ | 7 | – | 15 | .318 | 17 | – | 35 | .327 |
| Middle Tennessee ‍‍‍ | 5 | – | 18 | .217 | 14 | – | 34 | .292 |
† – Conference champion ‡ – Tournament champion y – Invited to the NCAA tournament As of June 2009; Rankings from

== Women's College World Series ==
The 2009 NCAA Women's College World Series took place from May 28 to June 2, 2009 in Oklahoma City.

First round
1 | Florida | 3
9 | Arizona | 0
4 | Alabama | 1
5 | Michigan | 6
9 | Arizona | 0
4 | Alabama | 14
3 | Washington | 3
6 | Georgia | 1
10 | Arizona State | 7
Missouri | 3
6 | Georgia | 5
Missouri | 2

Second round
1 | Florida | 1
5 | Michigan | 0
10 | Arizona State | 2
4 | Alabama | 6
3 | Washington | 1
10 | Arizona State | 0
5 | Michigan | 5
6 | Georgia | 7

Semifinals
1 | Florida | 6 | —
4 | Alabama | 5 | —
3 | Washington | 8 | 9
6 | Georgia | 9 | 3

Finals
1 | Florida | 0 | 2 | —
3 | Washington | 8 | 3 | —

== Season leaders ==
Batting

- Batting average: .500 – Re'Quincia Mack, Alabama A&M Lady Bulldogs
- RBIs: 96 – Stacie Chambers, Arizona Wildcats
- Home runs: 31 – Stacie Chambers, Arizona Wildcats

Pitching

- Wins: 42-8 – Danielle Lawrie Washington Huskies
- ERA: 0.61 (25 ER/285.1 IP) – Stacey Nelson, Florida Gators
- Strikeouts: 521 – Danielle Lawrie Washington Huskies

== Records ==
Team single game double plays: 5 – Alabama Crimson Tide; May 17, 2009

== Awards ==
- USA Softball Collegiate Player of the Year:

Danielle Lawrie Washington Huskies

- Honda Sports Award Softball:

Danielle Lawrie Washington Huskies

| YEAR | W | L | GP | GS | CG | SHO | SV | IP | H | R | ER | BB | SO | ERA | WHIP |
| 2009 | 42 | 8 | 52 | 50 | 46 | 21 | 0 | 352.2 | 165 | 60 | 49 | 76 | 521 | 0.97 | 0.68 |

| YEAR | G | AB | R | H | BA | RBI | HR | 3B | 2B | TB | SLG | BB | SO | SB | SBA |
| 2009 | 56 | 112 | 16 | 30 | .268 | 30 | 7 | 0 | 3 | 54 | .482% | 17 | 21 | 0 | 0 |

== All America Teams ==
The following players were members of the All-American Teams.

First Team

| Position | Player | Class | School |
|---|---|---|---|
| P | Stacey Nelson | SR. | Florida Gators |
| P | Danielle Lawrie | JR. | Washington Huskies |
| P | Kelsi Dunne | SO. | Alabama Crimson Tide |
| C | Chelsea Bramlett | JR. | Mississippi State Bulldogs |
| 1B | Adrienne Monka | FR. | Northwestern Wildcats |
| 2B | Ashley Charters | SR. | Washington Huskies |
| 3B | Alisa Goler | SO. | Georgia Bulldogs |
| SS | Tammy Williams | SR. | Northwestern Wildcats |
| OF | Brittany Lastrapes | SO. | Arizona Wildcats |
| OF | Katie Schroeder | SO. | UCLA Bruins |
| OF | Kaitlin Cochran | SR. | Arizona State Sun Devils |
| UT | Megan Langenfeld | JR. | UCLA Bruins |
| UT | Amber Flores | JR. | Oklahoma Sooners |
| AT-L | Nikki Nemitz | JR. | Michigan Wolverines |
| AT-L | Missy Penna | SR. | Stanford Cardinal |
| AT-L | Alissa Haber | JR. | Stanford Cardinal |
| AT-L | Taylor Schlopy | SO. | Georgia Bulldogs |
| AT-L | Charlotte Morgan | JR. | Alabama Crimson Tide |

Second Team

| Position | Player | Class | School |
|---|---|---|---|
| P | Brandice Balschmiter | SR. | UMass Minutewomen |
| P | Stephanie Brombacher | SO. | Florida Gators |
| P | Brittany Weil | SR. | Iowa Hawkeyes |
| C | Melissa Roth | JR. | Louisville Cardinals |
| 1B | Tiffany Huff | JR. | Tennessee Lady Vols |
| 2B | Aja Paculba | SO. | Florida Gators |
| 3B | Lindsey Ubrun | SR. | Missouri Tigers |
| SS | Molly Johnson | JR. | Kentucky Wildcats |
| OF | Kelsey Bruder | SO. | Florida Gators |
| OF | Francesca Enea | JR. | Florida Gators |
| OF | Brittany Rogers | SR. | Alabama Crimson Tide |
| UT | Becca Heteniak | JR. | DePaul Blue Demons |
| UT | Amanda Chidester | FR. | Michigan Wolverines |
| AT-L | Ashley Hansen | FR. | Stanford Cardinal |
| AT-L | Samantha Marder | JR. | Ohio State Buckeyes |
| AT-L | Samantha Ricketts | SR. | Oklahoma Sooners |
| AT-L | Maria Schweisberger | SO. | Missouri Tigers |
| AT-L | Amber Patton | SR. | DePaul Blue Demons |

Third Team

| Position | Player | Class | School |
|---|---|---|---|
| P | Sarah Hamilton | SO. | FSU Seminoles |
| P | Kim Reeder | SR. | Ohio State Buckeyes |
| P | Kristen Wadwell | JR. | Louisville Cardinals |
| C | Stacie Chambers | SO. | Arizona Wildcats |
| 1B | Christine Lux | JR. | Notre Dame Fighting Irish |
| 2B | Danielle Zymkowitz | SO. | Illinois Fighting Illini |
| 3B | Cheyenne Jenks | SR. | FGCU Eagles |
| 3B | Jenae Leles | SR. | Arizona Wildcats |
| SS | Bianca Mejia | JR. | Long Island Sharks |
| OF | Karli Hubbard | SR. | ULL Ragin' Cajuns |
| OF | Kristen Shortridge | JR. | LSU Tigers |
| OF | Carly Normandin | JR. | UMass Minutewomen |
| UT | Danielle Spaulding | JR. | North Carolina Tar Heels |
| UT | Jessica Mapes | SR. | Arizona State Sun Devils |
| AT-L | Valerie Arioto | SO. | California Golden Bears |
| AT-L | Amanda Kamekona | SR. | UCLA Bruins |
| AT-L | Tara Oltman | JR. | Creighton Bluejays |
| AT-L | Jessica Purcell-Fitu | SO. | BYU Cougars |
| AT-L | Jenna Rhodes | SR. | Virginia Tech Hokies |
