= 2001 NCAA Division I softball tournament =

- Teams: 48
- Finals site: ASA Hall of Fame Stadium; Oklahoma City, Oklahoma
- Champions: Arizona (6th title)
- Runner-up: UCLA (18th WCWS Appearance)
- Winning coach: Mike Candrea (6th title)
- MOP: Jennie Finch (Arizona)

The 2001 NCAA Division I softball tournament was the twentieth annual tournament to determine the national champion of NCAA women's collegiate softball. Held during May 2001, forty-eight Division I college softball teams contested the championship. The tournament featured eight regionals of six teams, each in a double elimination format. The 2001 Women's College World Series was held in Oklahoma City, Oklahoma from May 24 through May 28 and marked the conclusion of the 2001 NCAA Division I softball season. Arizona won their sixth NCAA championship by defeating UCLA 1–0 in the final game. Arizona pitcher Jennie Finch was named Women's College World Series Most Outstanding Player.

== Regionals ==
=== Regional No. 1 ===
Opening Round

- Arizona defeated Saint Peter's, 4–2
- Cal State Fullerton defeated Texas Tech, 1–0
- Texas State defeated Hawaii, 2–1

Loser's Bracket

- Texas Tech defeated Saint Peter's, 3–2. Saint Peter's eliminated.
- Texas Tech defeated Hawaii, 4–2. Hawaii eliminated.

Semifinals and Finals

- Cal State Fullerton defeated Texas State, 10–1 (5 innings).
- Arizona defeated Texas Tech, 8–0 (6 innings). Texas Tech eliminated
- Arizona defeated Texas State, 6–2.
- Texas State defeated Cal State Fullerton, 4–3.
- Arizona defeated Cal State Fullerton, 5–4.

Arizona advances to WCWS.

=== Regional No. 2 ===
Opening Round

- UCLA defeated Coastal Carolina, 8–0 (5 innings).
- Wisconsin defeated Fresno State, 3–1 (9 innings).
- San Diego State defeated Cal State Northridge, 2–0.

Loser's Bracket

- Fresno State defeated Coastal Carolina, 6–4. Coastal Carolina eliminated.
- Cal State Northridge defeated Fresno State, 3–1. Fresno State eliminated.

Semifinals and Finals

- San Diego State defeated Wisconsin, 1–0.
- UCLA defeated Cal State Northridge, 9–0. Cal State Northridge eliminated.
- UCLA defeated San Diego State, 3–1.
- San Diego State defeated Wisconsin, 6–1. Wisconsin eliminated.
- UCLA defeated San Diego State, 11–0 (5 innings).

UCLA advances to WCWS.

=== Regional No. 3 ===
Opening Round

- LSU defeated Cornell, 8–0 (6 innings).
- Arizona State defeated Penn State, 4–1.
- Louisiana–Lafayette defeated Southern Miss, 5–1.

Loser's Bracket

- Penn State defeated Cornell, 5–0. Cornell eliminated.
- Penn State defeated Southern Miss, 1–0. Southern Miss eliminated.

Semifinals and Finals

- Arizona State defeated Louisiana–Lafayette, 2–1.
- LSU defeated Penn State, 2–1. Penn State eliminated.
- LSU defeated Arizona State, 3–2.
- Louisiana–Lafayette defeated Arizona State, 5–0. Arizona State eliminated.
- LSU defeated Louisiana–Lafayette, 2–1.

LSU advances to WCWS.

=== Regional No. 4 ===
Opening Round

- Alabama defeated UIC, 8–2.
- Michigan defeated Chattanooga, 1–0.
- South Florida defeated Oregon State, 2–1.

Loser's Bracket

- Chattanooga defeated UIC, 5–2. UIC eliminated.
- Oregon State defeated Chattanooga, 13–0 (5 innings). Chattanooga eliminated.

Semifinals and Finals

- Michigan defeated South Florida, 6–2 (13 innings).
- Alabama defeated Oregon State, 1–0. Oregon State eliminated.
- Michigan defeated Alabama, 3–2.
- South Florida defeated Alabama, 3–2. Alabama eliminated.
- Michigan defeated South Florida, 12–5.

Michigan advances to WCWS.

=== Regional No. 5 ===
Opening Round

- Oklahoma defeated Lehigh, 9–2.
- Washington defeated Seton Hall, 6–0.
- UMass defeated North Carolina, 4–2.

Loser's Bracket

- Lehigh defeated Seton Hall, 2–0. Seton Hall eliminated.
- North Carolina defeated Lehigh, 4–0. Lehigh eliminated.

Semifinals and Finals

- Washington defeated UMass, 8–0 (5 innings).
- Oklahoma defeated North Carolina, 13–0 (5 innings). North Carolina eliminated.
- Oklahoma defeated Washington, 3–2.
- Washington defeated UMass, 7–1. UMass eliminated.
- Oklahoma defeated Washington, 10–2.

Oklahoma advances to WCWS.

=== Regional No. 6 ===
Opening Round

- Nebraska defeated BYU, 3–1.
- Pacific defeated Central Michigan, 8–0 (6 innings).
- Stanford defeated Hofstra, 4–0.

Loser's Bracket

- Hofstra defeated BYU, 4–2. BYU eliminated.
- Central Michigan defeated Hofstra, 10–0 (5 innings). Hofstra eliminated.

Semifinals and Finals

- Nebraska defeated Pacific, 2–1 (8 innings).
- Stanford defeated Central Michigan, 6–0. Central Michigan eliminated.
- Stanford defeated Nebraska, 5–1.
- Pacific defeated Nebraska, 3–1. Nebraska eliminated.
- Pacific defeated Stanford, 2–0.
- Stanford defeated Pacific, 9–1 (5 innings).

Stanford advances to WCWS.

=== Regional No. 7 ===
Opening Round

- Notre Dame defeated Western Illinois, 8–0 (5 innings).
- Iowa defeated Illinois State, 2–1.
- DePaul defeated South Carolina, 3–2 (9 innings).

Loser's Bracket

- Illinois State defeated Western Illinois, 4–0. Western Illinois eliminated.
- Illinois State defeated South Carolina, 1–0. South Carolina eliminated.

Semifinals and Finals

- Iowa defeated DePaul, 7–4.
- Notre Dame defeated Illinois State, 2–1. Illinois State eliminated.
- Iowa defeated Notre Dame, 6–0.
- Notre Dame defeated DePaul, 8–1. DePaul eliminated.
- Iowa defeated Notre Dame, 6–2.

Iowa advances to WCWS.

=== Regional No. 8 ===
Opening Round

- Florida State defeated Bethune–Cookman, 6–2.
- California defeated Connecticut, 2–0.
- Florida Atlantic defeated Florida, 3–0.

Loser's Bracket

- Connecticut defeated Bethune–Cookman, 2–1. Bethune–Cookman eliminated.
- Florida defeated Connecticut, 8–0 (5 innings). Connecticut eliminated.

Semifinals and Finals

- California defeated Florida Atlantic, 2–0.
- Florida State defeated Florida, 6–2. Florida eliminated.
- California defeated Florida State, 1–0.
- Florida State defeated Florida Atlantic, 2–0. Florida Atlantic eliminated.
- Florida State defeated California, 2–1.
- California defeated Florida State, 3–2 (10 innings).

California advances to WCWS.

== Women's College World Series ==
=== Participants ===
School	Conference	Record	Head coach	WCWS appearances† (Including 2001 WCWS)
Arizona	Pac-10	62–4	Mike Candrea	14
California	Pac-10	53–16	Diane Ninemire	6
Iowa	Big Ten	47–11	Gayle Blevins	4
LSU	SEC	57–9	Yvette Girouard	1
Michigan	Big Ten	43–15–1	Carol Hutchins	5
Oklahoma	Big 12	50–7	Patty Gasso	2
Stanford	Pac-10	52–14–1	John Rittman	1
UCLA	Pac-10	59–5	Sue Enquist	18*

*: Excludes UCLA's vacated 1995 WCWS participation.
†: Excludes results of the pre-NCAA Women's College World Series of 1969 through 1981.

=== Results ===
==== Bracket ====
First round
1	Arizona	3
8	California	2
4	Michigan	0
5	Oklahoma	2
8	California	5
4	Michigan	2
3	LSU	1
6	Stanford	2^{8}
2	UCLA	2
7	Iowa	0
3	LSU	2
7	Iowa	1

Second round
1	Arizona	5^{8}
5	Oklahoma	4
6	Stanford	1
8	California	0
2	UCLA	5
6	Stanford	0
5	Oklahoma	1
3	LSU	2^{13}

Semifinals
1	Arizona	1	—
6	Stanford	0	—
2	UCLA	6	—
3	LSU	0	—

Finals
1	Arizona	1
2	UCLA	0

==== Game results ====
Date	Game	Winner	Score	Loser	Notes
5/24/2001	Game 1	Arizona	3 - 2	California	
5/24/2001	Game 2	Oklahoma	2 - 0	Michigan	
5/24/2001	Game 3	Stanford	2 - 1	LSU	8 Innings
5/24/2001	Game 4	UCLA	2 - 0	Iowa	
5/25/2001	Game 5	Arizona	5 - 4	Oklahoma	8 Innings
5/25/2001	Game 6	UCLA	5 - 0	Stanford	
5/26/2001	Game 7	California	5 - 2	Michigan	Michigan eliminated
5/26/2001	Game 8	LSU	2 - 1	Iowa	Iowa eliminated
5/26/2001	Game 9	Stanford	1 - 0	California	California eliminated
5/26/2001	Game 10	LSU	2 - 1	Oklahoma	13 Innings Oklahoma eliminated
5/27/2001	Game 11	Arizona	1 - 0	Stanford	Stanford eliminated If Necessary Game (Game 13) not necessary
5/27/2001	Game 12	UCLA	6 - 0	LSU	LSU eliminated If Necessary Game (Game 14) not necessary
5/27/2001	Game 13	--	--	--	Arizona / Stanford If Necessary Game (Game 13) not necessary
5/27/2001	Game 14	--	--	--	UCLA / LSU If Necessary Game (Game 14) not necessary
5/28/2001	Championship game	Arizona	1 - 0	UCLA	Arizona Wins 2001 WCWS

==== Championship game ====
School	Top Batter	Stats.
Arizona	Lindsey Collins (C)	1-3 RBI HR K
UCLA	Amanda Freed (P)	1-3 BB

School	Pitcher	IP	H	R	ER	BB	SO	AB	BF
Arizona	Jennie Finch (W)	7.0	4	0	0	2	7	24	26
UCLA	Amanda Freed (L)	7.0	3	1	1	4	6	25	29

=== All-Tournament Team ===
The following players were members of the All-Tournament Team:

Position	Player	Class	School
Pitcher	Amanda Freed	Junior	UCLA
Pitcher	Britni Sneed	Junior	LSU
Pitcher	Jennifer Stewart	Junior	Oklahoma
Catcher	Lindsey Collins	Senior	Arizona
1st Base	Tairia Mims	Sophomore	UCLA
3rd Base	Toni Mascarenas	Senior	Arizona
3rd Base	Julie Wiese	Freshman	LSU
Outfield	Nicole Giordano	Senior	Arizona
Outfield	Jessica Mendoza	Junior	Stanford
Outfield	Christy Ring	Junior	Oklahoma
Designated Hitter	Claire Sua	Freshman	UCLA
Most Outstanding Player	Jennie Finch	Junior	Arizona
