= Amanda Freed =

American softball player (born 1979)

Biographical details
- Born: December 26, 1979 (age 46); Fountain Valley, California, U.S.

Playing career
- 1999–2002: UCLA
- 2005–2007: Texas/Rockford Thunder
- 2008: Chicago Bandits
- 2008: Denso
- Position: Pitcher

Coaching career (HC unless noted)
- 2008: Virginia

Accomplishments and honors

Championships
- Cowles Cup (2008)

Awards
- 2× first-team NFCA All-American (1999, 2002); 4× first-team All-Pac-10 (1999–2002)
Medal record
Women's softball
Representing the United States
Olympic Games
Gold medal – first place	2004 Athens	Team competition

Amanda Louise Freed (born December 26, 1979) is an American, former professional softball utility player and pitcher. She played college softball for UCLA, winning the national title for the Bruins in the 1999 Women's College World Series. In two other national runner-up finishes, she was also named All-Tournament in all her appearances at the world series. She later won a gold medal with Team USA at the 2004 Summer Olympics. In 2005, Freed joined the National Pro Fastpitch and played until 2008 for the defunct Rockford Thunder. She also served as a coach for Virginia.

== Early life and college career ==
Born in Fountain Valley, California and raised in nearby Cypress, Freed went to Pacifica High School in Garden Grove. As a pitcher in high school, Amanda won numerous awards, including the Gatorade National Female Athlete of the Year and Gatorade Softball Player of the Year. As a senior in high school, Freed was rank the top pitcher in the world and even threw five perfect games.

As the top softball recruit in 1998, Freed decided to attend UCLA where she played for the UCLA Bruins softball team from 1999 to 2002. To this day (2018) Freed stats at UCLA are impressive. Freed holds records in the top 10 for eight categories of pitching and eight categories of hitting.

== International playing career ==
Freed played for a number of years as part of the United States women's national softball team, winning gold at the Canadian Cup and World Cup in 2002, the team won gold at 2003 Pan American Games, 2004 Summer Olympics, and 2006 World Cup of Softball. Amanda was also an alternate at the 2000 Olympics, where the team won gold. Making the team in 2004, Freed made four appearances contributing a double and scoring three runs.

== Professional playing career ==
From 2005 to 2008, Freed played for National Pro Fastpitch, first with the Texas (later Rockford) Thunder from 2005 to 2007 then with the Chicago Bandits Cowles Cup championship team in 2008.

== Post-playing career ==
In 2008, Freed was an assistant coach at Virginia under Eileen Schmidt.

In 2009, Freed was a personal trainer for Reese Witherspoon during filming for the movie How Do You Know, in which Witherspoon played a softball player.

Freed later became a softball color commentator for FSW, ESPN and Pac-12 Network.

== College Statistics ==
YEAR	G	AB	R	H	BA	RBI	HR	3B	2B	TB	SLG	BB	SO	SB	SBA
1999	69	227	50	81	.357	21	1	1	12	98	.431%	12	29	9	10
2000	58	179	35	56	.313	19	2	3	15	83	.463%	18	30	13	17
2001	59	200	45	63	.315	27	3	3	9	87	.467%	22	24	16	18
2002	64	210	52	62	.295	31	1	4	14	86	.409%	20	15	13	13
TOTALS	250	816	182	262	.321	98	7	11	50	354	.435%	72	98	51	58

YEAR	W	L	GP	GS	CG	SHO	SV	IP	H	R	ER	BB	SO	ERA	WHIP
1999	27	4	35	32	31	15	3	211.2	124	37	29	63	187	0.96	0.88
2000	28	8	38	32	27	12	0	234.2	136	52	42	96	246	1.25	0.99
2001	21	4	27	25	17	11	1	152.0	70	15	10	28	157	0.46	0.64
2002	21	4	27	27	22	9	0	165.1	88	31	22	47	170	0.93	0.82
TOTALS	97	20	127	116	97	47	4	763.2	418	135	103	234	760	0.94	0.85
