= Texas State Bobcats softball =

- 2026 Texas State Bobcats softball team
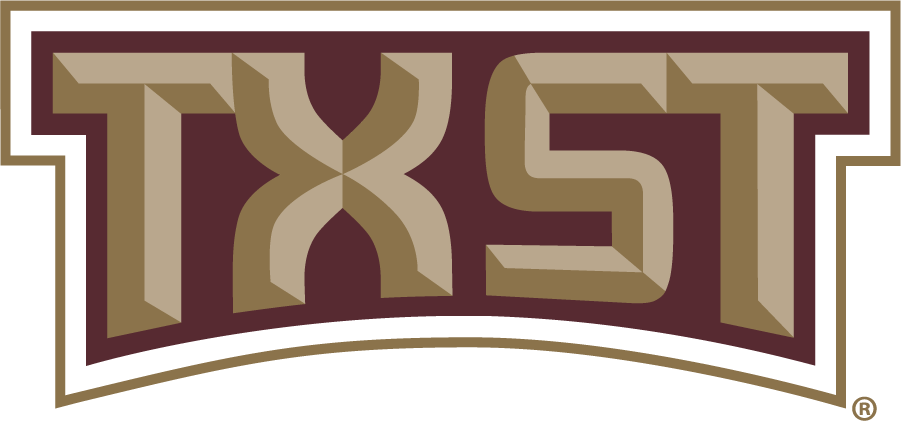
- Founded: 1985; 41 years ago
- University: Texas State University
- Head coach: Ricci Woodard (26th season)
- Conference: Pac-12
- Location: San Marcos, Texas, US
- Home stadium: Bobcat Softball Stadium (capacity: 1,000)
- Nickname: Bobcats
- Colors: Maroon and gold

NCAA Tournament appearances
- 1999, 2001, 2003, 2009, 2011, 2012, 2016, 2017, 2018, 2021, 2023, 2024, 2026

Conference tournament championships
- Southland: 1989, 1999, 2001, 2009, 2011, 2012; Sun Belt: 2018, 2024

Regular-season conference championships
- Southland: 2001, 2002, 2008, 2009, 2010, 2012; Sun Belt: 2018, 2025

The Texas State Bobcats softball team represents Texas State University in NCAA Division I college softball. The team are members of the Pac-12 Conference (Pac-12). The Bobcats are currently led by twenty-sixth-year head coach Ricci Woodard. The team plays its home games at Bobcat Softball Stadium located on the university's campus.

== Year-by-year results ==
Record table
Season	Coach	Overall	Conference	Standing	Postseason
Gulf Star Conference (1985–1987)
1985	Pam Wuestenberg	20–19	4–12		
1986	Pam Wuestenberg	13–35	4–14		
1987	Pam Wuestenberg	21–24	6–14		
Gulf Star:		54–78	14–40		
Southland Conference (1988–2012)
1988	Pam Wuestenberg	21–39	9–11	5th	
1989	Pam Wuestenberg	16–30	9–11	6th	
1990	Pam Wuestenberg	8–35	4–8	6th	
1991	Pam Wuestenberg	17–37	10–14	4th	
1992	Pam Wuestenberg	21–26	13–17	6th	
1993	Pam Wuestenberg	13–32	7–23	7th	
1994	Pam Wuestenberg	11–42–1	6–26	9th	
1995	Lee Ann Jarvis	17–35	9–23	8th	
1996	Lee Ann Jarvis	14–40	9–15	7th	
1997	Lee Ann Jarvis	12–37	8–15	8th	
1998	Lee Ann Jarvis	15–40	10–15	7th	
1999	Lee Ann Jarvis	34–31	14–13	6th	NCAA Regionals
2000	Bobby Reeves	35–24	16–11	4th	
2001	Ricci Woodard	54–12	26–1	1st	NCAA Regionals
2002	Ricci Woodard	37–22	23–4	1st	
2003	Ricci Woodard	46–18–1	21–5–1	2nd	NCAA Regional
2004	Ricci Woodard	37–20	19–7	2nd	
2005	Ricci Woodard	26–27	18–8	3rd	
2006	Ricci Woodard	34–22	18–5	2nd	
2007	Ricci Woodard	32–26	18–12	3rd	
2008	Ricci Woodard	35–18	25–5	1st	
2001	Ricci Woodard	40–18	23–6	1st	NCAA Regionals
2010	Ricci Woodard	27–26	20–10	2nd	
2011	Ricci Woodard	33–25	20–10	3rd	NCAA Regionals
2012	Ricci Woodard	39–17	18–2	2nd	NCAA Regional
Southland:		674–699–2	373–277–1		
Western Athletic Conference (2013)
2013	Ricci Woodard	18–38	10–11	4th	
WAC:		18–38	10–11		
Sun Belt Conference (2014–present)
2014	Ricci Woodard	26–30	9–12	5th	
2015	Ricci Woodard	32–21	14–6	3rd	
2016	Ricci Woodard	40–22	15–9	3rd	NCAA Regionals
2017	Ricci Woodard	42–17	18–8	2nd	NCAA Regionals
2018	Ricci Woodard	43–16	18–5	1st	NCAA Regionals
2019	Ricci Woodard	29–25	16–10	5th	
2020	Ricci Woodard	15–9	2–1		Season canceled due to COVID-19 pandemic
2021	Ricci Woodard	39–14	17–6	2nd	NCAA Regionals
2022	Ricci Woodard	38–19	19–8	3rd	
2023	Ricci Woodard	35–25–1	13–9–1	5th	NCAA Regionals
2024	Ricci Woodard	47–15	18–6	2nd	NCAA Regionals
2025	Ricci Woodard	34–19	16–8	1st	
Sun Belt:		420–232–1	175–88–1		
Total:		1,166–1,047–3			
National champion Postseason invitational champion Conference regular season champion Conference regular season and conference tournament champion Division regular season champion Division regular season and conference tournament champion Conference tournament champion
