= Jennie Finch =

American softball player (born 1980)

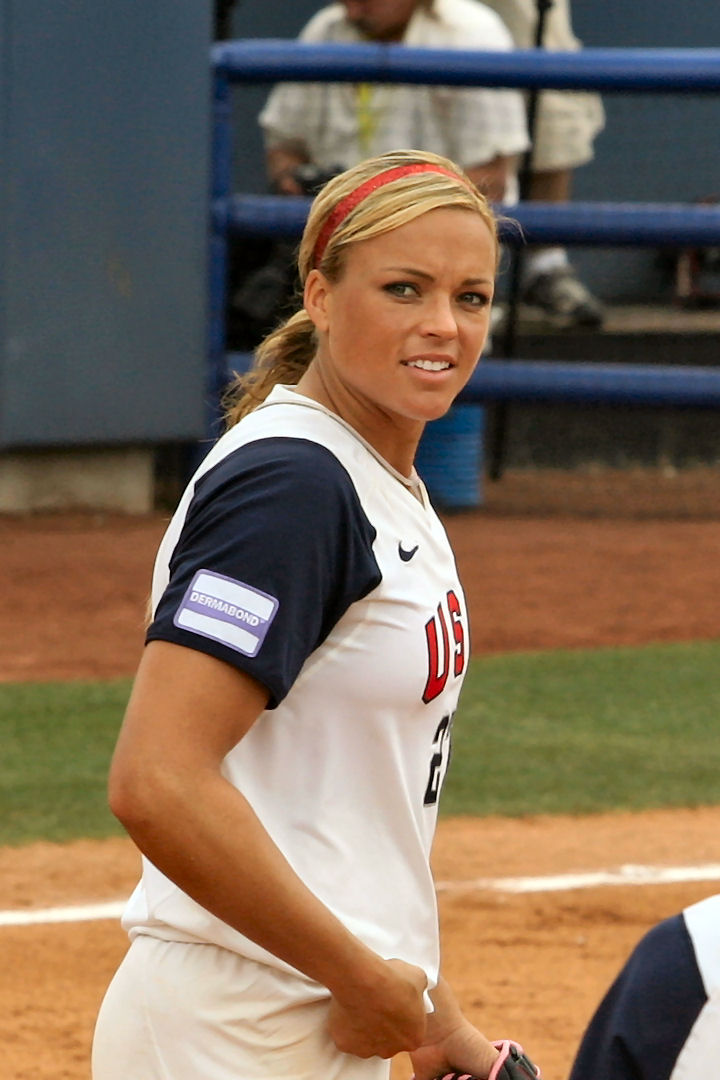
- Finch in 2008

Personal information
- Full name: Jennie Lynn Finch-Daigle
- National team: Team USA
- Born: Jennie Lynn Finch; September 3, 1980 (age 46) La Mirada, California, U.S.
- Height: 6 ft 0.83 in (1.85 m)
- Spouse: Casey Daigle (m.2005)

Sport
- Sport: Softball
- Position: Pitcher
- University team: Arizona Wildcats
Medal record
Women's softball
Representing the United States
Olympic Games
Gold medal – first place	2004 Athens	Team competition
Silver medal – second place	2008 Beijing	Team competition

Jennie Lynn Finch-Daigle (born September 3, 1980) is an American former softball player. She played for the Arizona Wildcats softball team from 1999 to 2002, where she won the 2001 Women's College World Series and was named collegiate All-American. Finch was a member of the United States women's national softball team that won the gold medal at the 2004 Summer Olympics and the silver medal at the 2008 Summer Olympics. She also pitched for the Chicago Bandits of the National Pro Fastpitch from 2005 to 2010.

Finch is ranked in several categories for both the Wildcats in the Pac-12 Conference and the NCAA Division I, where she was named #2 Greatest College Softball Player. She is the National Pro Fastpitch career leader in WHIP and is a National Softball Hall of Fame inductee. She has been ranked by Tucson, Arizona sportswriters as the #1 Best Arizona Wildcats Softball Player; picked the #5 Best NCAA Pitcher All-Time and was chosen by the Pac-12 for the All-Century Team as a pitcher.

Time magazine described her as the most famous softball player in history. In 2010, Finch retired from softball to focus on her family. In August 2011, she started working at ESPN as a color commentator for National Pro Fastpitch and college softball games.

== Early life and education ==
Finch was born in La Mirada, California. Finch has two older brothers, Shane and Landon Finch. She began playing softball at age five and pitching at age eight. Her father was her first pitching coach. Growing up, Finch was a bat girl for the University of California, Los Angeles. At La Mirada High School, Finch lettered four times in softball and twice each in basketball and volleyball. As a senior, she was the captain of all three sports. As a sophomore, she was an All-California Interscholastic Federation Division II choice in softball and All-Suburban League selection. In 2016, La Mirada retired her jersey number—the school's first for a softball player.

== University of Arizona ==
Finch majored in communications.

=== Freshman ===
Finch began her career on February 5, 1999, winning a run-rule game against the UIC Flames. She achieved a career high in doubles and threw her first career no-hitter during the NCAA tournament on May 22 vs. the Texas State Bobcats. Though they made the World Series, Finch and the Wildcats were eventually eliminated by the DePaul Blue Demons on May 29.

=== Sophomore ===
For her sophomore year, Jennie Finch was named a 2009 National Fastpitch Coaches Association First Team All-American and First Team All-Pac-10. She also threw three no-hitters and led the Wildcats in home runs and slugging percentage and achieved a career best in hits and batting average. Finch began the year with a 21 consecutive game win streak; in a 10–2 run-rule over the Southern Miss Golden Eagles on February 6 to a shutout win over Cal State Northridge Matadors on April 13. After suffering her only losses in back-to-back games, Finch finished the year 8–0 starting a new streak with an April 29 victory vs. the Oregon Ducks that would span the next two seasons. Finch's 23rd and 29th wins were over the No. 1 Washington Huskies, the latter began a 35 scoreless inning streak, after allowing runs in the fourth inning she shutout the team the rest of the way for a 4–2 margin on May 27.

=== Junior ===
As a junior in 2001, Finch was again named First Team for the NFCA and the conference, adding the Pitcher of the Year award. She would also hoist the Honda Sports Award for Softball Player of the Year. Finch's season ERA, wins and shutouts were and still do rank top 10 for the school. Along with a no-hitter and career highs in WHIP and RBIs, Finch opened the season with 31 consecutive scoreless innings spanning 6 wins that combined with the innings from her last game in 2000, was a career best 35 before being snapped in the second inning by a leadoff home run vs. McNeese State Cowgirls on February 24. On March 30, Finch hit two home runs and a double in an 11–1 romp of the Oregon Ducks to drive in a career best 9 RBIs, which tied her third all-time in the NCAA for a single game. On April 8, Finch won her third game over a No. 1 team, the UCLA Bruins.

Finch and the Wildcats were the No. 1 seed in the NCAA tournament and made it to the World Series for a third straight year with Finch in the circle. She recorded victories over the California Golden Bears and the Oklahoma Sooners to reach the finals. In a 1–0 shutout of the UCLA Bruins, Finch set an NCAA record with a perfect season capped with the National Championship. Finch also had a hit in the game and was named MVP for the series. The victory extended her win streak to 40 consecutive games along with the 8 to end the 2000 season. Her season was voted by Arizona Wildcats fans as the Best Individual Season for softball.

=== Senior ===
For a final season, Finch was named 2002 First Team for the NFCA and the Pac-10 conference as well as Pitcher of The Year and Honda Sports Award for softball. Finch tossed three no-hitters and broke the season strikeouts record, while her wins and shutouts were and remain top-10 school records. Beginning on February 9 vs. the Cal State Fullerton Titans, Finch matched her own record of 35 consecutive scoreless innings that was broken in a 13–1 mercy win over the Northern Iowa Panthers on February 23.

=== Legacy ===
Finch set several records in single games beginning with a new NCAA record by winning her 51st consecutive game. A near-capacity crowd filled Rita Hillenbrand Memorial Stadium and chants of "Jennie" echoed throughout the crowd in the 6–0 victory over Cal State Northridge. Finch said, "It's significant and it's nice. But it doesn't even come close to the team goal of winning a national championship." For one of her no-hitters, Finch posted her 100th career victory over the Notre Dame Fighting Irish on March 14. Later on March 24, she struck out 15 of the ULL Ragin' Cajuns for a career best in regulation; the Wildcats won, 7–2. On April 17, Finch won a 1–0 shutout in 9-innings and struck out 19 Oklahoma Sooners to tie a then school record. The Wildcat then beat the No. 1 UCLA Bruins by one run on April 6 to start the year 20–0 and set an NCAA record with 60 straight wins dating back to the 2000 season, including four wins over the No. 1 ranked team. To open a return trip to the WCWS as defending champion, Finch shutout the Nebraska Cornhuskers and ended the game with her 1,000th career strikeout. In the semifinals of the World Series, Finch hit her 50th career home run off Leslie Malerich to score the winning run and help herself beat the FSU Seminoles in 11-innings. The Wildcats suffered a 6–0 loss in the championship to the California Golden Bears.

Finch left the program the career leader in strikeouts, shutouts, innings pitched and tied for no-hitters (8), while ranking in the top-10 in most other pitching categories. She also was top-10 in home runs, RBIs and walks; she remains top-10 in several pitching and the walks all-time lists. She currently is 6th and 7th in winning percentage (0.881%) for a career in the now-named Pac-12 and the NCAA.

Finch's prolific career at the WCWS included appearances all four years with the Wildcats and included a 7–2 record, 70 strikeouts, three shutouts, allowing 17 earned runs, 41 hits and 27 walks for 1.83 ERA and 1.04 WHIP in 65.0 innings. At the plate she also contributed 5 hits, a home run and two walks.

Her jersey number, 27 (the date of her parents' first date), was retired by the University of Arizona in a pre-game ceremony at Hillenbrand Stadium on May 9, 2003.

== 2004 Olympics ==
Finch was a member of the USA softball team at the 2004 Summer Olympics in Athens. As a pitcher she posted a 2–0 win–loss record striking out 13 batters in eight innings while giving up only one hit, one walk and no runs. Her pitching helped lead the American team to the gold medal.

== 2008 Olympics ==
The USA team started its bid for a fourth straight gold medal at the 2008 Olympic games in Beijing with Finch pitching four no-hit innings in an 11–0 victory over Venezuela. Finch then pitched 5 shutout innings in a 7–0 victory over Chinese Taipei and two more shut out innings in a 9–0 victory over China. However, the U.S. lost 3–1 to Japan in the final game and came home with a silver medal. After the loss, Finch said, "I feel like we let USA softball down. Many women have worn this uniform, and accepted nothing but gold." Along with baseball, the International Olympic Committee (IOC) decided in 2005 to drop softball from the Olympics, making 2008 possibly the last time the sport is played in the Olympics, before it will be reinstated in 2020. A crusader for softball's reinstatement for the 2016 Olympics, Finch said that "[i]t deserves to be an Olympic sport." After the final game, Finch said:

Over 140 countries play this game. ... you don't have to be six-four. You don't have to be 200 pounds. We have all different shapes and sizes. The sport tests so many athletic abilities, from hand-eye coordination, to speed, to agility, to quickness. We're finally at the pinnacle, we've finally been established. Please don't take this away.

== National Pro Fastpitch ==
Finch pitched for the Chicago Bandits of the National Pro Fastpitch (NPF) softball league. She was named NPF's Co-Pitcher of the Year in 2005, sharing the award with teammate Lauren Bay. She also threw her first career no-hitter in a win over the Stratford Brakettes that same year. With a perfect season, Finch extended the streak in 2006 before opening 2007 with a loss. Finch won 15 consecutive games with 104.1 innings pitched, allowing 51 hits, 12 earned runs, 21 walks and whiffing 127 batters to post a 0.80 ERA and 0.69 WHIP.

Finch holds the league's season ERA crown, which she set in 2007. On May 29, in a 1–0 12-inning loss to the Rockford Thunder, Finch struck out 17 and combined with Cat Osterman for a total of 41 strikeouts to set a single-game record for the combined total. On August 1, she set a career high with 16 strikeouts in a regulation win against the Michigan Ice. August 15, she set a career best with 18 more strikeouts to defeat the Rockford Thunder in 9-innings.

She pitched a perfect game for the Bandits in 2009 against the Philadelphia Force and another perfect game on July 9, 2010 against the Akron Racers. That year, Finch was named All-NPF. Finch currently leads in career WHIP and is top-10 all-time in strikeouts, ERA, strikeout ratio and fielding percentage. The Chicago Bandits played their home games in Rosemont, Illinois, at 27 Jennie Finch Way where her jersey is also retired.

== Manager ==
On May 29, 2016, Finch was the guest manager of the Atlantic League's Bridgeport Bluefish for the day, thus becoming the first woman to manage a professional baseball team. The team played and won one game.

== Media ==
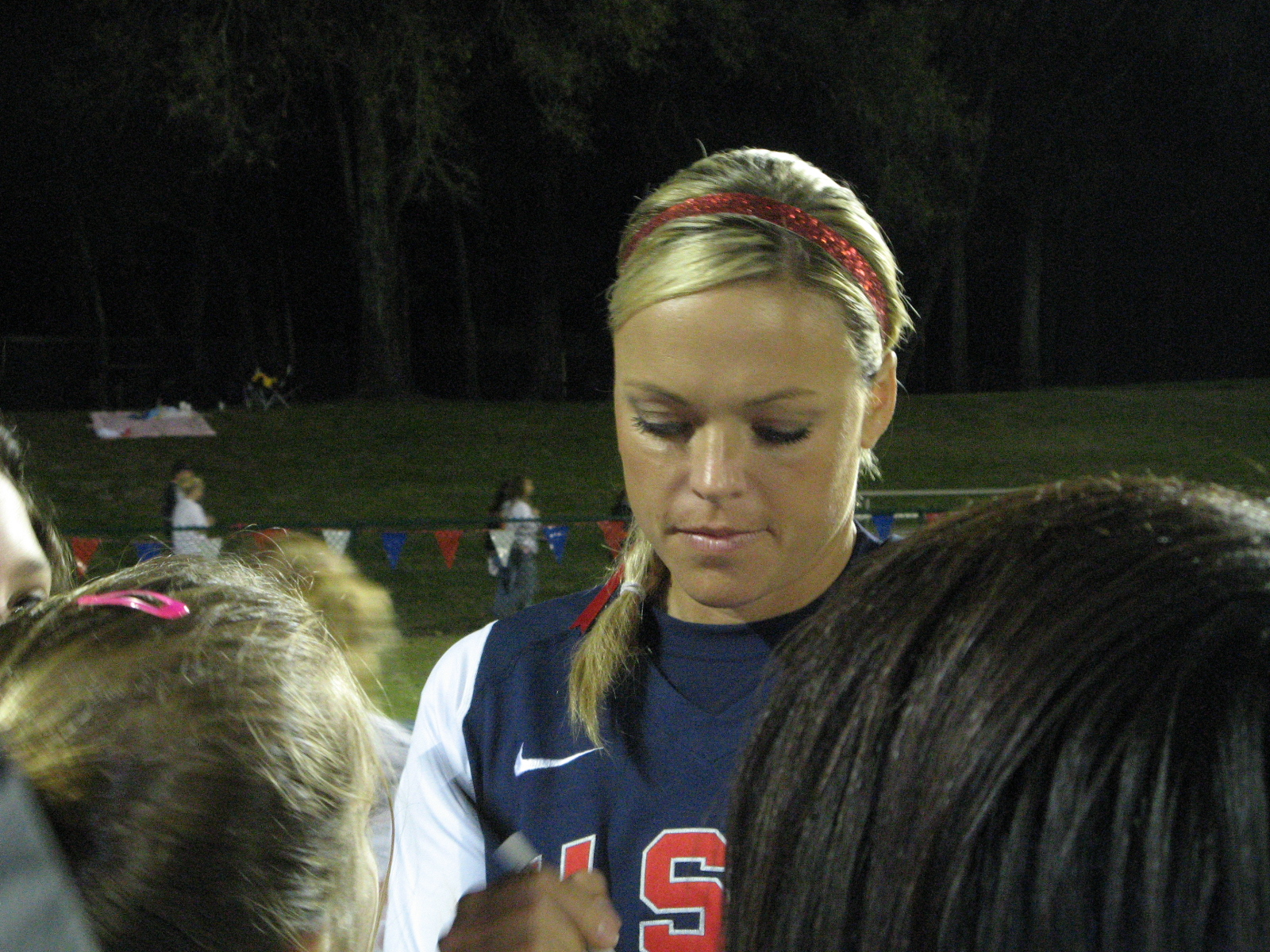
Finch signing autographs

In 2002, ESPN called Finch the "runaway winner" of the Best Dressed competition at the Excellence in Sports Performance Yearly Awards.

In 2003, Finch received the most votes in an ESPN online poll as the most attractive female athlete.

In 2004, People magazine named Finch one of its "50 Most Beautiful People", the only female athlete in the list. "This is truly amazing to be recognized by People magazine for this honor," Finch said. "It is really special to be included among some of the most famous and beautiful people in the world. I still have a hard time believing that I was selected as part of this group." Finch also appeared in an episode of season 5 of the TV series The Parkers.

Finch has modeled swimwear for the Sports Illustrated Swimsuit Edition in 2005. Finch was offered lucrative contracts to disrobe for Playboy and Maxim magazine, but turned them down.

This Week in Baseball signed Finch as a co-host. In a segment called the Jennie Challenge, Finch pitches to Major League Baseball players and often strikes them out. In softball, the mound is closer to home plate than baseball and Finch's pitches are the equivalent of a 98 mph pitch. "Some big-timers refuse to face her," Cal Ripken Jr. says. "Many feel it could be embarrassing." In an interview with ESPN, Finch explained, "I was throwing them mostly rise balls and change-ups. They've never seen a pitch like that, you know? With the closer distance from the mound, I think it really surprises them how fast the pitch gets there. And especially with the rise – when they're used to that over-the-top release point – there is nothing else like it. The ball movement throws them off."

In the 2004 Pepsi All-Star Softball Game, Finch struck out Albert Pujols, Mike Piazza and Brian Giles. "I never touched a pitch," said Giles. "Her fastball was the fastest thing I've ever seen, from that distance. It rises and cuts at the same time."

In 2006, Finch appeared in Season One of Pros vs Joes on Spike TV, a show in which sports stars compete with ordinary people. She was the first woman to appear on the show.

Finch appeared on an episode of The Real Housewives of Orange County.

In 2008, Finch was featured as a contestant on The Celebrity Apprentice where she selected International Breast Cancer Research Foundation as her charity. She was fired by Donald Trump in the fourth week of the season.

In 2008, Finch also served as the Grand Marshal of the nationally televised McDonald's Thanksgiving Parade in downtown Chicago.

Finch pitched for the National League in the 2010 Legends and Celebrities Softball Game, at Angel Stadium, the 2011 game at Chase Field, and the 2015 game at Great American Ballpark in Cincinnati, in 2017 at Marlins Park in Miami, and in 2018 at Nationals Park in Washington.

In 2011, Finch co-authored Throw Like a Girl: How to Dream Big and Believe in Yourself, with Ann Killion. The book is a collection of life lessons Finch learned growing up playing sports. On November 6, 2011, just four and a half months after giving birth to son Diesel, Finch finished the New York Marathon with a time of 4:05:26, raising $30,000 for the New York Road Runners Youth Program.

In April 2018, Finch was announced as one of the celebrities who will compete on season 26 of Dancing with the Stars. She was partnered with professional dancer Keo Motsepe.

In 2021, Finch was featured in MLB The Show 21 in Road To The Show storyline of her being a former two-way player.

== Personal life ==
Finch married Major League Baseball pitcher Casey Daigle on January 15, 2005. Daigle proposed to Finch on the softball field at the University of Arizona, her alma mater. According to Finch, "He blindfolded me and took me to the mound and said, 'You have been the queen of the diamond for four years. Now I want you to be the queen of my heart.'" They have three children: Ace (2006), Diesel (2011), and Paisley (2013).

Finch is an avid fan of the Los Angeles Dodgers.

Finch is a Christian. Finch turned down large financial offers to appear in magazines like Playboy because of her Christian faith, saying she wanted to be a role model for young women. Finch has spoken about her faith, saying: "It's so important to find hope in [Jesus] and live for a higher purpose: to share about Him." Finch cited her Christian faith while on the show Dancing with the Stars when she refused to dance to a Janelle Monáe song because she deemed it too risqué.

== Retirement ==
On July 20, 2010, age 29 and still dominating the sport, Finch announced her retirement from softball to focus on her family. "I just feel like it gets harder and harder every year with Ace getting older and time away from my husband and even family events such as birthdays and friends' weddings and things that I've always just missed out on because of softball," Finch said in an interview with the Associated Press. Said Finch, "This whole career has been way more than I ever even imagined or dreamed. The opportunities that I'd be able to enjoy and appreciate and be a part of, it's been incredible." In her final start with the US National Team, Finch struck out 12, only allowing three singles, two of those infield hits. She continued playing with the Chicago Bandits until the National Pro Fastpitch season ended in August.

Finch was considered the most dominant and recognizable softball pitcher of her era. "She set the standard for softball in a new era of being able to be feminine and play this sport," U.S. outfielder Jessica Mendoza said. "Not that you have to be feminine to play this sport, but I see hundreds of thousands of little girls now with glitter headbands, hot pink bats, makeup. ... when I was growing up, it wasn't like that." According to Mike Candrea, her coach at Arizona and through two Olympics, "Jennie has transformed this sport, touched millions of young kids in many different ways – whether it's fashion, whether it's the way she plays the game – but through it all she's been very humble." A Chicago Tribune editorial commented, "She leaves with a spotless personal reputation, an intent to keep promoting softball, and the knowledge that she has inspired other girls and women who play for the love of the game."

== Career statistics ==
United States National Team
YEAR	W	L	GP	GS	CG	SHO	SV	IP	H	R	ER	BB	SO	ERA	WHIP
2001	2	0	5	2	2	2	0	17.0	1	1	1	0	23	0.41	0.06
2002	6	0	9	7	5	4	0	40.1	22	6	4	7	41	0.69	0.72
2003	7	1	11	8	5	3	1	47.2	11	4	2	6	78	0.29	0.36
2004	15	0	28	16	7	7	1	100.1	20	4	3	16	208	0.27	0.36
Olympics	2	0	2	2	1	1	0	8.0	1	0	0	1	13	0.00	0.25
2005	4	1	7	5	3	2	0	26.0	16	5	4	6	34	1.08	0.84
Olympics	2	0	3	2	1	1	0	11.0	2	0	0	3	14	0.00	0.45
TOTALS	38	2	65	42	24	20	2	250.1	73	20	14	39	411	0.39	0.45

Arizona Wildcats
YEAR	W	L	GP	GS	CG	SHO	SV	IP	H	R	ER	BB	SO	ERA	WHIP
1999	24	8	34	30	26	11	0	202.1	158	70	60	64	179	2.08	1.10
2000	29	2	31	24	24	13	0	194.0	102	25	22	53	204	0.79	0.80
2001	32	0	32	29	27	19	0	207.0	102	19	16	45	279	0.54	0.71
2002	34	6	43	39	36	21	1	273.1	136	46	38	82	366	0.97	0.80
TOTALS	119	16	140	122	113	64	1	876.2	498	160	136	244	1,028	1.08	0.84

Arizona Wildcats
YEAR	G	AB	R	H	BA	RBI	HR	3B	2B	TB	SLG	BB	SO	SB	SBA
1999	68	192	16	47	.245	34	7	0	14	82	.427%	16	36	3	4
2000	68	188	38	63	.335	48	16	0	10	121	.643%	28	35	0	0
2001	67	198	37	62	.313	57	11	2	11	110	.555%	24	25	0	0
2002	67	190	43	59	.310	56	16	0	8	115	.605%	37	36	1	1
TOTALS	270	768	134	231	.301	195	50	2	43	428	.557%	105	132	4	5

NPF Chicago Bandits
YEAR	W	L	G	GS	CG	SHO	SV	IP	H	R	ER	BB	SO	ERA	WHIP
2005	14	0	15	15	8	5	1	95.0	46	17	12	20	114	0.88	0.69
2006	1	0	5	2	0	0	0	6.2	4	1	1	1	8	1.13	0.80
2007	7	2	9	8	7	5	0	66.2	16	4	1	10	119	0.10	0.39
2009	7	2	13	8	3	1	2	49.0	12	17	12	23	61	1.71	0.71
2010	6	4	28	13	8	4	0	66.0	42	22	19	18	80	1.82	0.91
TOTAL	35	8	97	46	26	15	3	283.1	120	61	45	72	382	1.11	0.68

NPF Chicago Bandits
YEAR	AB	R	H	BA	RBI	HR	3B	2B	TB	SLG	BB	SO	SB
2005	81	14	25	.308	22	6	0	0	43	.531%	22	16	2
2006	10	1	3	.300	2	0	0	0	3	.300%	1	1	0
2007	42	1	6	.143	2	0	0	0	6	.143%	8	16	0
2009	33	5	7	.212	6	3	0	0	73	.485%	5	11	0
2010	75	6	20	.266	9	1	1	6	31	.413%	8	20	0
TOTALS	241	27	61	.253	41	10	1	6	99	.411%	44	64	2

La Mirada High School
YEAR	W	L	GP	GS	CG	SHO	SV	IP	H	R	ER	BB	SO	ERA
TOTALS	50	12					4	445.0					784	0.15

== See also ==
- Women in baseball
