= 2022 NCAA Division I softball season =

College softball in the United States

- Duration: February 10, 2022 – June 9, 2022
- Number of teams: 301
- Preseason No. 1: Oklahoma
- Defending Champions: Oklahoma
- TV partner/s: ESPN & ESPN+

NCAA Tournament
- Duration: May 20 – June 9
- Most conference bids: SEC, 12 bids

Women's College World Series
- Duration: June 2 – June 9
- Champions: Oklahoma (6th title)
- Runners-up: Texas (6th WCWS Appearance)
- Winning Coach: Patty Gasso (6th title)
- WCWS MOP: Jocelyn Alo

Seasons
- ← 2021 2023 →

The 2022 NCAA Division I softball season, part of college softball in the United States organized by the National Collegiate Athletic Association (NCAA) at the Division I level, began in February 2022. The season progressed through the regular season, many conference tournaments and championship series, and concluded with the 2022 NCAA Division I softball tournament and 2022 Women's College World Series. The Women's College World Series, consisting of the eight remaining teams in the NCAA Tournament and held annually in Oklahoma City, Oklahoma, at ASA Hall of Fame Stadium, ended in June 2022.

== Realignment ==
The following conference moves for the 2022 season were announced:

- Five schools left the Southland Conference. Abilene Christian, Lamar, Sam Houston, and Stephen F. Austin moved to the WAC, and Central Arkansas left for the ASUN.
- The Mid-Eastern Athletic Conference lost three members. Bethune–Cookman and Florida A&M joined the Southwestern Athletic Conference, and North Carolina A&T joined the Big South Conference.
- The Ohio Valley Conference lost Eastern Kentucky and Jacksonville State to the ASUN.
- The Summit League gained St. Thomas from NCAA Division III's Minnesota Intercollegiate Athletic Conference after the reception of a waiver for a direct transition to D-I.

== Season outlook ==
USA Today/NFCA DI Coaches Poll
Ranking	Team
1	Oklahoma
2	Alabama
3	UCLA
4	Florida State
5	Oklahoma State
6	Florida
7	Washington
8	Arkansas
9	Arizona
10	Texas
11	Missouri
12	Georgia
13	Virginia Tech
14	LSU
15	Clemson
16	Michigan
17	James Madison
18	Oregon
19	Kentucky
20	Duke
21	Arizona State
22	Tennessee
23	Louisiana
24	Liberty
25	Wichita State

ESPN.com/USA Softball Collegiate Poll
Ranking	Team
1	Oklahoma
2	Alabama
3	UCLA
4	Oklahoma State
5	Florida
6	Florida State
7	Washington
8	Texas
9	Arkansas
10	Virginia Tech
11	Arizona
12	Missouri
13	Michigan
14	Clemson
15	LSU
16	Tennessee
17	Oregon
18	Duke
19	Georgia
20	Kentucky
21	Arizona State
22	James Madison
23	Louisiana
24	Northwestern
25	Wichita State

D1Softball
Ranking	Team
1	Oklahoma
2	Alabama
3	Oklahoma State
4	UCLA
5	Florida
6	Florida State
7	Washington
8	Arkansas
9	Texas
10	Missouri
11	Virginia Tech
12	Michigan
13	Duke
14	Clemson
15	Arizona
16	Oregon
17	LSU
18	Tennessee
19	Georgia
20	Kentucky
21	Arizona State
22	Louisiana
23	Northwestern
24	Liberty
25	James Madison

Softball America
Ranking	Team
1	Oklahoma
2	Oklahoma State
3	Alabama
4	UCLA
5	Florida State
6	Florida
7	Arizona
8	Washington
9	Missouri
10	Arkansas
11	Texas
12	Virginia Tech
13	Michigan
14	Clemson
15	Duke
16	LSU
17	Oregon
18	Georgia
19	Louisiana
20	Kentucky
21	Arizona State
22	James Madison
23	Tennessee
24	Liberty
25	Wichita State

== Conference standings ==
2022 America East Conference softball standings
	Conf.				Overall
Team	W		L	PCT	W		L	PCT
UMBC ‍†‍‡‍^{y}	12	–	6	.667	31	–	12	.721
Stony Brook ‍‍‍	10	–	6	.625	31	–	16	.660
Albany ‍‍‍	10	–	6	.625	25	–	17	.595
UMass Lowell ‍‍‍	10	–	7	.588	28	–	20	.583
Binghamton ‍‍‍	7	–	8	.467	22	–	23	.489
Hartford ‍‍‍	5	–	13	.278	17	–	29	.370
Maine ‍‍‍	4	–	12	.250	8	–	37	.178
† – Conference champion ‡ – Tournament champion y – Invited to the NCAA tournament As of June 5, 2022; Rankings from NFCA/USA Today

2022 American Athletic Conference softball standings
	Conf.						Overall
Team	W		L		T	PCT	W		L		T	PCT
No. 21 UCF ‍†‍‡‍^{y}	16	–	2	–	0	.889	49	–	14	–	0	.778
Wichita State ‍‍‍^{y}	14	–	4	–	0	.778	34	–	18	–	0	.654
South Florida ‍‍‍^{y}	12	–	5	–	0	.706	45	–	16	–	0	.738
Houston ‍‍‍	8	–	9	–	1	.472	27	–	27	–	1	.500
Tulsa ‍‍‍	7	–	9	–	1	.441	18	–	30	–	1	.378
East Carolina ‍‍‍	2	–	16	–	0	.111	20	–	36	–	0	.357
Memphis ‍‍‍	2	–	16	–	0	.111	16	–	38	–	0	.296
† – Conference champion ‡ – Tournament champion y – Invited to the NCAA tournament As of June 5, 2022; Rankings from NFCA/USA Today

2022 ASUN Conference softball standings
	Conf.				Overall
Team	W		L	PCT	W		L	PCT
East Division
Liberty ^{x}‍‍‡‍^{y}	23	–	1	.958	44	–	18	.710
North Florida ‍‍‍	16	–	8	.667	42	–	17	.712
Kennesaw State ‍‍‍	12	–	12	.500	23	–	28	.451
Stetson ‍‍‍	10	–	14	.417	21	–	35	.375
Florida Gulf Coast ‍‍‍	9	–	15	.375	18	–	33	.353
Jacksonville ‍‍‍	9	–	15	.375	15	–	31	.326
West Division
Central Arkansas ^{x}‍‍‍	17	–	7	.708	37	–	21	.638
North Alabama ‍‍‍	15	–	9	.625	40	–	20	.667
Jacksonville State ‍‍‍	13	–	11	.542	31	–	24	.564
Lipscomb ‍‍‍	10	–	14	.417	20	–	32	.385
Eastern Kentucky ‍‍‍	9	–	15	.375	13	–	36	.265
Bellarmine ‍‍‍	1	–	23	.042	10	–	41	.196
x – Division champion ‡ – Tournament champion y – Invited to the NCAA tournament As of June 5, 2022; Rankings from NFCA/USA Today

2022 Atlantic 10 Conference softball standings
	Conf.				Overall
Team	W		L	PCT	W		L	PCT
George Washington ‍†‍‍	21	–	3	.875	36	–	16	.692
Fordham ‍‍‡‍^{y}	15	–	8	.652	30	–	23	.566
Saint Joseph's ‍‍‍	14	–	8	.636	23	–	23	.500
Saint Louis ‍‍‍	13	–	10	.565	22	–	29	.431
Dayton ‍‍‍	12	–	11	.522	22	–	25	.468
George Mason ‍‍‍	12	–	12	.500	24	–	26	.480
UMass ‍‍‍	12	–	12	.500	19	–	32	.373
Rhode Island ‍‍‍	4	–	20	.167	11	–	36	.234
St. Bonaventure ‍‍‍	1	–	23	.042	8	–	38	.174
† – Conference champion ‡ – Tournament champion y – Invited to the NCAA tournament As of June 5, 2022; Rankings from NFCA/USA Today

2022 Atlantic Coast Conference softball standings
	Conf.				Overall
Team	W		L	PCT	W		L	PCT
No. 10 Virginia Tech ‍†‍‍^{y}	21	–	2	.913	46	–	10	.821
No. 12 Duke ‍‍‍^{y}	19	–	3	.864	44	–	11	.800
No. 13 Florida State ‍‍‡‍^{y}	19	–	5	.792	54	–	7	.885
Notre Dame ‍‍‍^{y}	16	–	5	.762	40	–	12	.769
No. 16 Clemson ‍‍‍^{y}	14	–	10	.583	42	–	17	.712
Virginia ‍‍‍	13	–	11	.542	28	–	26	.519
Georgia Tech ‍‍‍	11	–	13	.458	38	–	18	.679
Louisville ‍‍‍	10	–	14	.417	27	–	25	.519
Syracuse ‍‍‍	7	–	15	.318	26	–	21	.553
NC State ‍‍‍	7	–	17	.292	33	–	23	.589
North Carolina ‍‍‍	6	–	18	.250	23	–	28	.451
Boston College ‍‍‍	6	–	18	.250	20	–	27	.426
Pittsburgh ‍‍‍	2	–	20	.091	14	–	27	.341
† – Conference champion ‡ – Tournament champion y – Invited to the NCAA tournament As of June 14, 2022; Rankings from NFCA

2022 Big 12 Conference softball standings
	Conf.						Overall
Team	W		L		T	PCT	W		L		T	PCT
No. 1 Oklahoma ‍†‍‍^{y}	17	–	1	–	0	.944	59	–	3	–	0	.952
No. 7 Oklahoma State ‍‍‡‍^{y}	14	–	4	–	0	.778	48	–	14	–	0	.774
No. 17 Texas ‍‍‍^{y}	12	–	6	–	0	.667	47	–	22	–	1	.679
Iowa State ‍‍‍	6	–	12	–	0	.333	28	–	27	–	0	.509
Baylor ‍‍‍	6	–	12	–	0	.333	32	–	24	–	0	.571
Texas Tech ‍‍‍	5	–	13	–	0	.278	22	–	27	–	0	.449
Kansas ‍‍‍	3	–	15	–	0	.167	20	–	36	–	0	.357
† – Conference champion ‡ – Tournament champion y – Invited to the NCAA tournament As of June 9, 2022; Rankings from NFCA/USA Today

2022 Big East Conference softball standings
	Conf.				Overall
Team	W		L	PCT	W		L	PCT
UConn ‍†‍‍	20	–	4	.833	38	–	18	.679
Butler ‍‍‍	16	–	6	.727	31	–	17	.646
Villanova ‍‍‡‍^{y}	16	–	7	.696	32	–	24	.571
DePaul ‍‍‍	16	–	8	.667	29	–	24	.547
Providence ‍‍‍	11	–	13	.458	25	–	21	.543
Seton Hall ‍‍‍	9	–	14	.391	20	–	23	.465
Georgetown ‍‍‍	5	–	16	.238	15	–	28	.349
Creighton ‍‍‍	5	–	17	.227	15	–	27	.357
St. John's ‍‍‍	5	–	18	.217	12	–	35	.255
† – Conference champion ‡ – Tournament champion As of June 5, 2022; Rankings from NFCA/USA Today

2022 Big Sky Conference softball standings
	Conf.				Overall
Team	W		L	PCT	W		L	PCT
Weber State ‍†‍‡‍^{y}	13	–	1	.929	38	–	10	.792
Sacramento State ‍‍‍	12	–	6	.667	30	–	25	.545
Portland State ‍‍‍	10	–	5	.667	28	–	18	.609
Northern Colorado ‍‍‍	10	–	8	.556	23	–	30	.434
Idaho State ‍‍‍	8	–	10	.444	25	–	27	.481
Montana ‍‍‍	6	–	11	.353	20	–	27	.426
Southern Utah ‍‍‍	0	–	18	.000	3	–	40	.070
† – Conference champion ‡ – Tournament champion y – Invited to the NCAA tournament As of June 5, 2022; Rankings from NFCA/USA Today

2022 Big South Conference softball standings
	Conf.				Overall
Team	W		L	PCT	W		L	PCT
USC Upstate ‍†‍‍	21	–	6	.778	48	–	10	.828
Campbell ‍†‍‡‍^{y}	21	–	6	.778	37	–	19	.661
Longwood ‍†‍‍	21	–	6	.778	34	–	24	.586
Presbyterian ‍‍‍	19	–	8	.704	36	–	15	.706
Charleston Southern ‍‍‍	12	–	13	.480	27	–	28	.491
Radford ‍‍‍	12	–	15	.444	19	–	29	.396
Winthrop ‍‍‍	10	–	17	.370	18	–	37	.327
Gardner–Webb ‍‍‍	7	–	20	.259	15	–	29	.341
Hampton ‍‍‍	7	–	20	.259	19	–	36	.345
North Carolina A&T ‍‍‍	3	–	22	.120	13	–	35	.271
† – Conference champion ‡ – Tournament champion y – Invited to the NCAA tournament As of June 5, 2022; Rankings from NFCA/USA Today

2022 Big Ten Conference softball standings
	Conf.						Overall
Team	W		L		T	PCT	W		L		T	PCT
No. 10 Northwestern ‍†‍‍^{y}	19	–	4	–	0	.826	45	–	13	–	0	.776
Nebraska ‍‍‡‍^{y}	17	–	5	–	0	.773	41	–	16	–	0	.719
Illinois ‍‍‍^{y}	15	–	7	–	0	.682	34	–	22	–	0	.607
Maryland ‍‍‍	14	–	8	–	0	.636	29	–	23	–	0	.558
No. 24 Michigan ‍‍‍^{y}	14	–	8	–	0	.636	38	–	18	–	0	.679
Ohio State ‍‍‍^{y}	13	–	9	–	0	.591	36	–	17	–	0	.679
Penn State ‍‍‍	13	–	10	–	0	.565	32	–	22	–	0	.593
Wisconsin ‍‍‍^{y}	12	–	11	–	0	.522	30	–	21	–	0	.588
Minnesota ‍‍‍^{y}	11	–	12	–	0	.478	27	–	26	–	1	.509
Indiana ‍‍‍	10	–	13	–	0	.435	27	–	22	–	0	.551
Purdue ‍‍‍	7	–	15	–	0	.318	24	–	31	–	0	.436
Michigan State ‍‍‍	4	–	16	–	0	.200	24	–	28	–	0	.462
Rutgers ‍‍‍	3	–	17	–	0	.150	25	–	30	–	0	.455
Iowa ‍‍‍	3	–	20	–	0	.130	21	–	31	–	0	.404
† – Conference champion ‡ – Tournament champion y – Invited to the NCAA tournament As of June 5, 2022; Rankings from NFCA/USA Today

2022 Big West Conference softball standings
	Conf.				Overall
Team	W		L	PCT	W		L	PCT
Cal State Fullerton ‍†‍‍^{y}	20	–	7	.741	37	–	22	.627
Long Beach State ‍‍‍	19	–	8	.704	29	–	22	.569
Hawaii ‍‍‍	17	–	10	.630	23	–	19	.548
UC Riverside ‍‍‍	16	–	11	.593	25	–	24	.510
UC San Diego ‍‍‍	15	–	12	.556	28	–	28	.500
Cal State Northridge ‍‍‍	14	–	13	.519	24	–	30	.444
Cal Poly ‍‍‍	14	–	13	.519	19	–	29	.396
UC Davis ‍‍‍	11	–	16	.407	23	–	29	.442
UC Santa Barbara ‍‍‍	6	–	21	.222	15	–	39	.278
Cal State Bakersfield ‍‍‍	3	–	24	.111	8	–	37	.178
† – Conference champion y – Invited to the NCAA tournament As of June 5, 2022; Rankings from NFCA/USA Today

2022 Colonial Athletic Association softball standings
	Conf.				Overall
Team	W		L	PCT	W		L	PCT
Delaware ‍†‍‍	11	–	4	.733	29	–	16	.644
James Madison* ‍‍‍	10	–	5	.667	21	–	21	.500
Hofstra ‍‍‍	13	–	6	.684	21	–	27	.438
UNC Wilmington ‍‍‡‍^{y}	11	–	8	.579	32	–	15	.681
Elon ‍‍‍	10	–	8	.556	30	–	22	.577
College of Charleston ‍‍‍	7	–	10	.412	15	–	37	.288
Drexel ‍‍‍	5	–	14	.263	24	–	23	.511
Towson ‍‍‍	4	–	16	.200	14	–	33	.298
† – Conference champion ‡ – Tournament champion y – Invited to the NCAA tournament *Ineligible for the 2022 Tournament due to postseason ban imposed by the CAA. As of June 5, 2022; Rankings from NFCA/USA Today

2022 Conference USA softball standings
	Conf.				Overall
Team	W		L	PCT	W		L	PCT
East
Western Kentucky ^{x}‍‍‍	17	–	7	.708	38	–	13	.745
Marshall ‍‍‍	15	–	9	.625	35	–	18	.660
Florida Atlantic ‍‍‍	15	–	9	.625	29	–	26	.527
Charlotte ‍‍‍	12	–	12	.500	35	–	23	.603
Middle Tennessee ‍‍‍	6	–	18	.250	19	–	34	.358
FIU ‍‍‍	5	–	19	.208	19	–	31	.380
West
Louisiana Tech ^{x}‍‍‍	18	–	6	.750	39	–	20	.661
North Texas ‍‍‡‍^{y}	17	–	7	.708	37	–	16	.698
UAB ‍‍‍	13	–	10	.565	25	–	24	.510
UTSA ‍‍‍	11	–	12	.478	18	–	30	.375
Southern Miss ‍‍‍	9	–	15	.375	29	–	23	.558
UTEP ‍‍‍	5	–	19	.208	15	–	34	.306
x – Division champion ‡ – Tournament champion y – Invited to the NCAA tournament As of June 5, 2022; Rankings from NFCA/USA Today

2022 Horizon League softball standings
	Conf.				Overall
Team	W		L	PCT	W		L	PCT
Oakland ‍†‍‡‍^{y}	18	–	7	.720	26	–	17	.605
Cleveland State ‍‍‍	18	–	8	.692	22	–	24	.478
Youngstown State ‍‍‍	17	–	9	.654	32	–	24	.571
Robert Morris ‍‍‍	16	–	9	.640	31	–	21	.596
Green Bay ‍‍‍	15	–	10	.600	25	–	25	.500
Northern Kentucky ‍‍‍	14	–	13	.519	27	–	29	.482
UIC ‍‍‍	10	–	15	.400	13	–	32	.289
IUPUI ‍‍‍	9	–	17	.346	12	–	38	.240
Purdue Fort Wayne ‍‍‍	6	–	20	.231	7	–	42	.143
Detroit Mercy ‍‍‍	6	–	21	.222	6	–	36	.143
† – Conference champion ‡ – Tournament champion y – Invited to the NCAA tournament As of June 5, 2022; Rankings from NFCA/USA Today

2022 Ivy League softball standings
	Conf.						Overall
Team	W		L		T	PCT	W		L		T	PCT
Princeton ‍†‍‡‍^{y}	17	–	4	–	0	.810	27	–	17	–	2	.609
Harvard ‍‍‍	15	–	6	–	0	.714	22	–	20	–	0	.524
Dartmouth ‍‍‍	14	–	7	–	0	.667	20	–	24	–	0	.455
Yale ‍‍‍	9	–	12	–	0	.429	11	–	23	–	0	.324
Columbia ‍‍‍	8	–	13	–	0	.381	12	–	26	–	0	.316
Cornell ‍‍‍	7	–	14	–	0	.333	17	–	23	–	0	.425
Brown ‍‍‍	7	–	14	–	0	.333	16	–	25	–	0	.390
Penn ‍‍‍	7	–	14	–	0	.333	12	–	31	–	0	.279
† – Conference champion ‡ – Tournament champion y – Invited to the NCAA tournament As of June 5, 2022; Rankings from NFCA/USA Today

2022 Mid-American Conference softball standings
	Conf.						Overall
Team	W		L		T	PCT	W		L		T	PCT
Miami (OH) ‍†‍‡‍^{y}	24	–	5	–	0	.828	40	–	16	–	1	.711
Ohio ‍‍‍	17	–	10	–	0	.630	23	–	25	–	0	.479
Central Michigan ‍‍‍	17	–	11	–	0	.607	27	–	24	–	0	.529
Bowling Green ‍‍‍	16	–	11	–	0	.593	30	–	18	–	0	.625
Ball State ‍‍‍	15	–	14	–	0	.517	22	–	31	–	0	.415
Buffalo ‍‍‍	13	–	14	–	0	.481	22	–	24	–	0	.478
Akron ‍‍‍	13	–	16	–	0	.448	18	–	32	–	0	.360
Western Michigan ‍‍‍	12	–	17	–	0	.414	22	–	33	–	0	.400
Kent State ‍‍‍	11	–	17	–	0	.393	20	–	28	–	0	.417
Northern Illinois ‍‍‍	11	–	18	–	0	.379	18	–	28	–	0	.391
Toledo ‍‍‍	5	–	21	–	0	.192	12	–	37	–	0	.245
† – Conference champion ‡ – Tournament champion y – Invited to the NCAA tournament As of June 5, 2022; Rankings from NFCA/USA Today

2022 Metro Atlantic Athletic Conference softball standings
	Conf.						Overall
Team	W		L		T	PCT	W		L		T	PCT
Canisius ‍†‍‡‍^{y}	16	–	4	–	0	.800	32	–	18	–	0	.640
Fairfield ‍‍‍	17	–	5	–	0	.773	27	–	22	–	0	.551
Siena ‍‍‍	14	–	6	–	0	.700	32	–	23	–	0	.582
Rider ‍‍‍	11	–	9	–	0	.550	28	–	25	–	1	.528
Marist ‍‍‍	11	–	10	–	0	.524	25	–	29	–	0	.463
Iona ‍‍‍	10	–	10	–	0	.500	23	–	24	–	0	.489
Niagara ‍‍‍	9	–	12	–	0	.429	15	–	25	–	0	.375
Manhattan ‍‍‍	7	–	11	–	0	.389	13	–	30	–	0	.302
Saint Peter's ‍‍‍	7	–	13	–	0	.350	22	–	33	–	0	.400
Monmouth ‍‍‍	6	–	14	–	0	.300	11	–	38	–	0	.224
Quinnipiac ‍‍‍	5	–	15	–	0	.250	12	–	29	–	0	.293
† – Conference champion ‡ – Tournament champion y – Invited to the NCAA tournament As of June 5, 2022; Rankings from NFCA/USA Today

2022 Mid-Eastern Athletic Conference softball standings
	Conf.				Overall
Team	W		L	PCT	W		L	PCT
Morgan State ‍†‍‍	18	–	3	.857	31	–	15	.674
Howard ‍‍‡‍^{y}	17	–	4	.810	31	–	24	.564
Norfolk State ‍‍‍	16	–	5	.762	34	–	23	.596
Maryland Eastern Shore ‍‍‍	13	–	8	.619	18	–	33	.353
North Carolina Central ‍‍‍	8	–	13	.381	12	–	36	.250
Coppin State ‍‍‍	7	–	14	.333	8	–	37	.178
Delaware State ‍‍‍	3	–	18	.143	4	–	33	.108
South Carolina State ‍‍‍	2	–	19	.095	3	–	37	.075
† – Conference champion ‡ – Tournament champion y – Invited to the NCAA tournament As of June 5, 2022; Rankings from NFCA/USA Today

2022 Missouri Valley Conference softball standings
	Conf.						Overall
Team	W		L		T	PCT	W		L		T	PCT
Northern Iowa ‍†‍‍	22	–	2	–	0	.917	32	–	14	–	0	.696
Missouri State ‍‍‡‍^{y}	18	–	7	–	0	.720	28	–	20	–	0	.583
Southern Illinois ‍‍‍	16	–	10	–	0	.615	27	–	19	–	1	.585
Drake ‍‍‍	14	–	12	–	0	.538	21	–	29	–	0	.420
Bradley ‍‍‍	13	–	14	–	0	.481	26	–	26	–	0	.500
Illinois State ‍‍‍	12	–	13	–	0	.480	24	–	28	–	0	.462
Indiana State ‍‍‍	12	–	14	–	0	.462	26	–	26	–	0	.500
Evansville ‍‍‍	9	–	18	–	0	.333	24	–	27	–	0	.471
Loyola Chicago ‍‍‍	9	–	18	–	0	.333	16	–	31	–	0	.340
Valparaiso ‍‍‍	5	–	22	–	0	.185	14	–	33	–	0	.298
† – Conference champion ‡ – Tournament champion y – Invited to the NCAA tournament As of June 5, 2022; Rankings from NFCA/USA Today

2022 Mountain West Conference softball standings
	Conf.				Overall
Team	W		L	PCT	W		L	PCT
San Diego State ‍†‍‍^{y}	20	–	4	.833	39	–	16	.709
Boise State ‍‍‍	19	–	5	.792	40	–	10	.800
UNLV ‍‍‍	17	–	7	.708	43	–	15	.741
Utah State ‍‍‍	13	–	11	.542	28	–	28	.500
Fresno State ‍‍‍	10	–	14	.417	19	–	36	.345
Colorado State ‍‍‍	9	–	15	.375	18	–	28	.391
San Jose State ‍‍‍	7	–	17	.292	22	–	29	.431
Nevada ‍‍‍	7	–	17	.292	17	–	35	.327
New Mexico ‍‍‍	6	–	18	.250	26	–	27	.491
† – Conference champion y – Invited to the NCAA tournament As of June 5, 2022; Rankings from NFCA/USA Today

2022 Northeast Conference softball standings
	Conf.				Overall
Team	W		L	PCT	W		L	PCT
Saint Francis (PA) ‍†‍‡‍^{y}	20	–	4	.833	37	–	18	.673
Mount St. Mary's ‍‍‍	17	–	7	.708	26	–	22	.542
Fairleigh Dickinson ‍‍‍	14	–	10	.583	24	–	25	.490
LIU Brooklyn ‍‍‍	13	–	11	.542	26	–	31	.456
Bryant ‍‍‍	13	–	11	.542	15	–	27	.357
Wagner ‍‍‍	12	–	12	.500	19	–	29	.396
Merrimack ‍‍‍	10	–	14	.417	14	–	28	.333
Sacred Heart ‍‍‍	5	–	19	.208	13	–	42	.236
Central Connecticut ‍‍‍	4	–	20	.167	8	–	41	.163
† – Conference champion ‡ – Tournament champion y – Invited to the NCAA tournament As of June 5, 2022; Rankings from NFCA/USA Today

2022 Ohio Valley Conference softball standings
	Conf.						Overall
Team	W		L		T	PCT	W		L		T	PCT
Murray State ‍†‍‡‍^{y}	21	–	7	–	0	.750	40	–	18	–	1	.686
Belmont ‍‍‍	20	–	8	–	0	.714	33	–	17	–	0	.660
UT Martin ‍‍‍	17	–	8	–	0	.680	34	–	19	–	0	.642
Southeast Missouri State ‍‍‍	16	–	10	–	0	.615	30	–	24	–	0	.556
Austin Peay ‍‍‍	17	–	11	–	0	.607	30	–	23	–	0	.566
Tennessee Tech ‍‍‍	13	–	14	–	0	.481	32	–	22	–	0	.593
Eastern Illinois ‍‍‍	10	–	17	–	0	.370	25	–	30	–	0	.455
SIU Edwardsville ‍‍‍	9	–	19	–	0	.321	19	–	35	–	0	.352
Morehead State ‍‍‍	7	–	20	–	0	.259	8	–	36	–	0	.182
Tennessee State ‍‍‍	6	–	22	–	0	.214	15	–	39	–	0	.278
† – Conference champion ‡ – Tournament champion y – Invited to the NCAA tournament As of June 5, 2022; Rankings from NFCA/USA Today

2022 Pac-12 Conference softball standings
	Conf.						Overall
Team	W		L		T	PCT	W		L		T	PCT
No. 8 Arizona State ‍†‍‍^{y}	20	–	4	–	0	.833	43	–	11	–	0	.796
No. 5 UCLA ‍‍‍^{y}	19	–	5	–	0	.792	51	–	10	–	0	.836
No. 11 Washington ‍‍‍^{y}	14	–	10	–	0	.583	38	–	17	–	0	.691
Stanford ‍‍‍^{y}	11	–	13	–	0	.458	39	–	22	–	0	.639
No. 23 Oregon ‍‍‍^{y}	10	–	14	–	0	.417	33	–	19	–	0	.635
Oregon State ‍‍‍^{y}	9	–	15	–	0	.375	39	–	22	–	0	.639
Utah ‍‍‍	9	–	15	–	0	.375	27	–	27	–	0	.500
Arizona ‍‍‍^{y}	8	–	16	–	0	.333	39	–	21	–	0	.650
California ‍‍‍	8	–	16	–	0	.333	28	–	27	–	1	.509
† – Conference champion y – Invited to the NCAA tournament As of June 6, 2022; Rankings from NFCA/USA Today

2022 Patriot League softball standings
	Conf.						Overall
Team	W		L		T	PCT	W		L		T	PCT
Boston University ‍†‍‍	16	–	2	–	0	.889	40	–	17	–	0	.702
Lehigh ‍‍‡‍^{y}	15	–	3	–	0	.833	31	–	20	–	1	.606
Army ‍‍‍	10	–	8	–	0	.556	20	–	34	–	0	.370
Colgate ‍‍‍	9	–	9	–	0	.500	20	–	28	–	0	.417
Holy Cross ‍‍‍	8	–	10	–	0	.444	21	–	29	–	0	.420
Bucknell ‍‍‍	3	–	15	–	0	.167	7	–	38	–	0	.156
Lafayette ‍‍‍	2	–	16	–	0	.111	10	–	37	–	0	.213
† – Conference champion ‡ – Tournament champion y – Invited to the NCAA tournament As of June 5, 2022; Rankings from NFCA/USA Today

2022 Southeastern Conference softball standings
	Conf.				Overall
Team	W		L	PCT	W		L	PCT
No. 9 Arkansas ‍†‍‡‍^{y}	19	–	5	.792	48	–	11	.814
No. 17 Alabama ‍‍‍^{y}	16	–	8	.667	44	–	13	.772
No. 20 Tennessee ‍‍‍^{y}	15	–	8	.652	41	–	18	.695
No. 5 Florida ‍‍‍^{y}	13	–	11	.542	49	–	19	.721
No. 21 Kentucky ‍‍‍^{y}	13	–	11	.542	37	–	19	.661
LSU ‍‍‍^{y}	13	–	11	.542	34	–	23	.596
No. 23 Missouri ‍‍‍^{y}	12	–	11	.522	38	–	22	.633
No. 22 Georgia ‍‍‍^{y}	12	–	12	.500	43	–	18	.705
Ole Miss ‍‍‍^{y}	12	–	12	.500	41	–	19	.683
No. 24 Auburn ‍‍‍^{y}	11	–	13	.458	40	–	17	.702
No. 19 Mississippi State ‍‍‍^{y}	10	–	14	.417	37	–	27	.578
Texas A&M ‍‍‍^{y}	6	–	18	.250	31	–	28	.525
South Carolina ‍‍‍	3	–	21	.125	26	–	30	.464
† – Conference champion ‡ – Tournament champion y – Invited to the NCAA tournament As of June 9, 2022; Rankings from NFCA/USA Today

2022 Southern Conference softball standings
	Conf.				Overall
Team	W		L	PCT	W		L	PCT
UNC Greensboro ‍†‍‍	16	–	2	.889	39	–	18	.684
Samford ‍‍‍	15	–	3	.833	34	–	19	.642
Chattanooga ‍‍‡‍^{y}	9	–	9	.500	30	–	27	.526
Furman ‍‍‍	8	–	10	.444	22	–	33	.400
Mercer ‍‍‍	7	–	11	.389	16	–	40	.286
Western Carolina ‍‍‍	4	–	14	.222	19	–	34	.358
East Tennessee State ‍‍‍	4	–	14	.222	8	–	48	.143
† – Conference champion ‡ – Tournament champion y – Invited to the NCAA tournament As of June 5, 2022; Rankings from NFCA/USA Today

2022 Southland Conference softball standings
	Conf.				Overall
Team	W		L	PCT	W		L	PCT
McNeese State ‍†‍‡‍^{y}	15	–	3	.833	40	–	21	.656
Southeastern Louisiana ‍‍‍	14	–	4	.778	40	–	16	.714
Texas A&M–Corpus Christi ‍‍‍	11	–	7	.611	25	–	27	.481
Northwestern State ‍‍‍	10	–	8	.556	29	–	22	.569
Incarnate Word ‍‍‍	5	–	13	.278	15	–	36	.294
Houston Baptist ‍‍‍	4	–	13	.235	19	–	29	.396
Nicholls ‍‍‍	4	–	14	.222	12	–	38	.240
† – Conference champion ‡ – Tournament champion y – Invited to the NCAA tournament As of June 5, 2022; Rankings from NFCA/USA Today

2022 Southwestern Athletic Conference softball standings
	Conf.				Overall
Team	W		L	PCT	W		L	PCT
East
Bethune-Cookman ^{x}‍‍‍	18	–	7	.720	25	–	25	.500
Jackson State ‍‍‍	12	–	12	.500	24	–	27	.471
Alabama State ‍‍‍	12	–	12	.500	24	–	31	.436
Florida A&M ‍‍‍	12	–	12	.500	18	–	31	.367
Alabama A&M ‍‍‍	10	–	14	.417	16	–	24	.400
Mississippi Valley State ‍‍‍	9	–	15	.375	11	–	26	.297
West
Texas Southern ^{x}‍‍‍	21	–	3	.875	26	–	20	.565
Prairie View A&M ‍‍‡‍^{y}	17	–	8	.680	20	–	29	.408
Grambling State ‍‍‍	11	–	13	.458	24	–	24	.500
Southern ‍‍‍	11	–	13	.458	15	–	33	.313
Alcorn State ‍‍‍	9	–	15	.375	17	–	33	.340
Arkansas–Pine Bluff ‍‍‍	4	–	20	.167	6	–	39	.133
x – Division champion ‡ – Tournament champion y – Invited to the NCAA tournament As of June 5, 2022; Rankings from NFCA/USA Today

2022 Summit League softball standings
	Conf.				Overall
Team	W		L	PCT	W		L	PCT
South Dakota State ‍†‍‡‍^{y}	18	–	2	.900	41	–	13	.759
Omaha ‍‍‍	17	–	4	.810	32	–	14	.696
North Dakota State ‍‍‍	10	–	8	.556	30	–	23	.566
South Dakota ‍‍‍	11	–	10	.524	28	–	25	.528
Kansas City ‍‍‍	9	–	11	.450	13	–	34	.277
St. Thomas (MN) ‍‍‍	8	–	13	.381	14	–	36	.280
North Dakota ‍‍‍	4	–	16	.200	14	–	39	.264
Western Illinois ‍‍‍	4	–	17	.190	8	–	37	.178
† – Conference champion ‡ – Tournament champion y – Invited to the NCAA tournament As of June 5, 2022; Rankings from NFCA/USA Today

2022 Sun Belt Conference softball standings
	Conf.				Overall
Team	W		L	PCT	W		L	PCT
Louisiana ‍†‍‡‍^{y}	23	–	4	.852	47	–	13	.783
South Alabama ‍‍‍	16	–	6	.727	26	–	21	.553
Texas State ‍‍‍	19	–	8	.704	39	–	19	.672
Troy ‍‍‍	15	–	12	.556	32	–	20	.615
UT Arlington ‍‍‍	12	–	15	.444	22	–	28	.440
Appalachian State ‍‍‍	10	–	15	.400	29	–	26	.527
Georgia State ‍‍‍	9	–	15	.375	21	–	34	.382
Louisiana–Monroe ‍‍‍	10	–	17	.370	27	–	27	.500
Coastal Carolina ‍‍‍	7	–	17	.292	25	–	29	.463
Georgia Southern ‍‍‍	6	–	18	.250	13	–	34	.277
† – Conference champion ‡ – Tournament champion y – Invited to the NCAA tournament As of June 5, 2022; Rankings from NFCA/USA Today

2022 Western Athletic Conference softball standings
	Conf.				Overall
Team	W		L	PCT	W		L	PCT
Southwest Division
Stephen F. Austin ^{x}‍‍‍	18	–	6	.750	31	–	27	.534
Abilene Christian ‍‍‍	15	–	9	.625	25	–	26	.490
Tarleton State ‍‍‍	14	–	10	.583	30	–	25	.545
Sam Houston State ‍‍‍	8	–	16	.333	15	–	39	.278
Lamar ‍‍‍	5	–	19	.208	11	–	38	.224
West Division
Grand Canyon ^{x}‍‍‡‍^{y}	19	–	5	.792	39	–	16	.709
Seattle ‍‍‍	15	–	9	.625	32	–	24	.571
California Baptist ‍‍‍	12	–	12	.500	30	–	26	.536
Utah Valley ‍‍‍	12	–	12	.500	24	–	27	.471
Dixie State ‍‍‍	8	–	16	.333	19	–	32	.373
New Mexico State ‍‍‍	6	–	18	.250	13	–	38	.255
x – Division champion ‡ – Tournament champion y – Invited to the NCAA tournament As of June 5, 2022; Rankings from NFCA/USA Today

2022 West Coast Conference softball standings
	Conf.				Overall
Team	W		L	PCT	W		L	PCT
BYU ‍†‍‍	13	–	2	.867	42	–	10	.808
Loyola Marymount ‍†‍‍^{y}	13	–	2	.867	37	–	17	.685
Santa Clara ‍‍‍	7	–	8	.467	21	–	30	.412
San Diego ‍‍‍	5	–	9	.357	20	–	34	.370
Saint Mary's ‍‍‍	4	–	11	.267	16	–	31	.340
Pacific ‍‍‍	2	–	12	.143	12	–	37	.245
† – Conference champion y – Invited to the NCAA tournament As of June 5, 2022; Rankings from NFCA/USA Today

== Awards ==
- USA Softball Collegiate Player of the Year: Jocelyn Alo, Oklahoma
- NFCA National Player of the Year: Jocelyn Alo, Oklahoma
- Softball America Player of the Year: Jocelyn Alo, Oklahoma
- NFCA National Pitcher of the Year: Georgina Corrick, South Florida
- Softball America Pitcher of the Year: Georgina Corrick, South Florida
- NFCA National Freshman of the Year: Jordy Bahl, Oklahoma
- Softball America Freshman of the Year: Jordy Bahl, Oklahoma
- Softball America Defensive Player of the Year: Jordyn Rudd, Northwestern
- NFCA Catcher of the Year: Mia Davidson, Mississippi State
- NFCA Golden Shoe Award: Alexis Johns, South Florida

== All-America Teams ==
The following players were members of the All-American Teams.

First Team

Position	Player	Class	School
P	Georgina Corrick	SR.	South Florida
P	Jordy Bahl	FR.	Oklahoma
P	Kelly Maxwell	R-JR.	Oklahoma State
C	Mia Davidson	GS	Mississippi State
1B	Danielle Gibson	R-SR.	Arkansas
2B	Tiare Jennings	SO.	Oklahoma
3B	Hannah Gammill	SO.	Arkansas
SS	Baylee Klingler	SR.	Washington
OF	Rachel Lewis	GS	Northwestern
OF	Jayda Coleman	SO.	Oklahoma
OF	KB Sides	R-SR.	Arkansas
UT	Valerie Cagle	SO.	Clemson
UT	Jocelyn Alo	R-SR.	Oklahoma
AT-L	Keely Rochard	SR.	Virginia Tech
AT-L	Grace Lyons	SR.	Oklahoma
AT-L	Danielle Williams	SR.	Northwestern
AT-L	Linnie Malkin	R-SR.	Arkansas
AT-L	Cydney Sanders	FR.	Arizona State

Second Team

Position	Player	Class	School
P	Chenise Delce	R-JR.	Arkansas
P	Megan Faraimo	R-JR.	UCLA
P	Kathryn Sandercock	SR.	Florida State
C	Delanie Wisz	R-SR.	UCLA
1B	Haley Lee	SR.	Texas A&M
2B	Janae Jefferson	SR.	Texas
3B	Sydney Sherrill	R-SR.	Florida State
SS	Erin Coffel	SO.	Kentucky
OF	Yannira Acuña	SR.	Arizona State
OF	Addison Barnard	SO.	Wichita State
OF	Bailey Vannoy	SR.	Charlotte
UT	Miranda Elish	GS	Oklahoma State
UT	Skylar Wallace	R-JR.	Florida
AT-L	Gabbie Plain	GS	Washington
AT-L	Sydney McKinney	JR.	Wichita State
AT-L	Allie Skaggs	SO.	Arizona
AT-L	Sara Mosley	JR.	Georgia
AT-L	Montana Fouts	SR.	Alabama

Third Team

Position	Player	Class	School
P	Mariah Mazon	SR.	Oregon State
P	Hailey Dolcini	SR.	Texas
P	Peyton St. George	GS	Duke
C	Makena Smith	JR.	California
1B	Karina Gaskins	SO.	Notre Dame
2B	Cam Ybarra	SO.	Nebraska
3B	Karli Spaid	SO.	Miami (OH)
SS	Jameson Kavel	GS	Duke
OF	Carmyn Greenwood	GS	Louisville
OF	Emma Ritter	SO.	Virginia Tech
OF	Ellessa Bonstrom	SR.	Utah
UT	Sierra Lange	GS	George Washington
UT	Mac Barbara	R-FR.	San Diego State
AT-L	Briana Perez	R-SR.	UCLA
AT-L	Bailey Parshall	SR.	Penn State
AT-L	Rachel Becker	SR.	Purdue
AT-L	Mya Stevenson	SR.	Marshall
AT-L	Lacey Fincher	SR.	Georgia

== Coaching changes ==
This table lists programs that changed head coaches at any point from the first day of the 2022 season until the day before the first day of the 2023 season.

Team	Former coach	Interim coach	New coach	Reason
Michigan State	Jacquie Joseph			Joseph announced her retirement after 29 seasons at Michigan State on May 12.
Texas A&M	Jo Evans			On May 23, Texas A&M announced that head coach Jo Evans' contract would not be renewed.

== See also ==
- 2022 NCAA Division I baseball season
