= America East Conference softball tournament =

- Conference softball championship
- Sport: Softball
- Conference: America East Conference
- Number of teams: 6
- Format: Double-elimination
- Current stadium: University Field
- Current location: Stony Brook, New York
- Played: 1992–present
- Last contest: 2025
- Current champion: Binghamton
- Most championships: Boston University (9)
- Official website: americaeast.com/softball

The America East Conference softball tournament is the conference championship tournament in college softball for the America East Conference. The winner receives the conference's automatic bid to the NCAA Division I softball tournament.

== Tournament ==
The top 6 teams compete in the double-elimination tournament, with the top two seeds receiving a single bye.

== Champions ==
=== Year-by-year ===
Year	School	Venue	MVP
1992	Boston University	Philadelphia, PA	Shannon Downey, Boston University
1993	Boston University	Newark, DE	Deb Smith, Maine
1994	Maine	Newark, DE	Deb Smith, Maine
1995	Hofstra	Newark, DE	Erin Phillips, Hofstra
1996	Boston University	Burlington, VT	Audrey West, Boston University
1997	Boston University	Hempstead, NY	Niclana Tolmasoff, Boston University
1998	Hofstra	Newark, DE	Jen Smith, Hofstra
1999	Hofstra	Burlington, VT	Alicia Smith, Hofstra
2000	Hofstra	Hofstra Softball Stadium • Hempstead, NY	Alicia Smith, Hofstra
2001	Hofstra	Newark, DE	Shannon Luther, Hofstra
2002	Boston University	Burlington, VT	Robyn Horrick, Boston University
2003	Boston University	University Field • Stony Brook, NY	Julie Henneke, Boston University
2004	Maine	Mike Kessock Field • Orono, ME	Lauren Dulkis, Maine
2005	Albany	University Field • Stony Brook, NY	Amanda Morin, Albany
2006	Albany	Mike Kessock Field • Orono, ME	Casey Halloran, Albany
2007	Albany	Boston University Softball Field • Boston, MA	Casey Halloran, Albany
2008	Stony Brook	Albany Field • Albany, NY	Alyssa Struzenberg, Stony Brook
2009	Boston University	University Field • Stony Brook, NY	Cassidi Hardy, Boston University
2010	Boston University	Mike Kessock Field • Orono, ME	Cassidi Hardy, Boston University
2011	Albany	Boston University Softball Field • Boston, MA	Brittany MacFawn, Albany
2012	Boston University	Boston University Softball Field • Boston, MA	Holli Floetker, Boston University
2013	Stony Brook	Varsity Field • Vestal, NY	Allison Cukrov, Stony Brook
2014	Albany	University Field • Stony Brook, NY	Brittany MacFawn, Albany
2015	Binghamton	University Field • Stony Brook, NY	Sarah Miller, Binghamton
2016	Maine	Varsity Field • Vestal, NY	Erin Boganovich, Maine
2017	Albany	Varsity Field • Vestal, NY	Devin Durando, Albany
2018	Albany	Varsity Field • Vestal, NY	Celeste Verdolivo, Albany
2019	UMBC	Hartford Softball Field • West Hartford, CT	Courtney Coppersmith, UMBC
2020	Canceled due to COVID-19 pandemic		
2021	UMBC	UMBC Softball Stadium • Baltimore, MD	Sierra Pierce, UMBC
2022	UMBC	University Field • Stony Brook, NY	Courtney Coppersmith, UMBC
2023	UMBC	UMBC Softball Stadium • Baltimore, MD	Madison Wilson, UMBC
2024	Albany	UMaine Softball Complex • Orono, ME	Wendi Hammond, Albany
2025	Binghamton	Bearcats Softball Complex • Binghamton, NY	Brianna Roberts, Binghamton
2026	Binghamton	Pierre & Catherine Labat Softball Complex • Orono, ME	Rachel Carey, Binghamton

=== By school ===
School	Championships	Years
Boston University	9	1992, 1993, 1996, 1997, 2002, 2003, 2009, 2010, 2012
Albany	8	2005, 2006, 2007, 2011, 2014, 2017, 2018, 2024
Hofstra	5	1995, 1998, 1999, 2000, 2001
UMBC	4	2019, 2021, 2022, 2023
Binghamton	3	2015, 2025, 2026
Maine	3	1994, 2004, 2016
Stony Brook	2	2008, 2013

Italics indicates no longer sponsors softball in the America East Conference.
