= Jayda Coleman =

American softball player (born 2001)

Utah Talons – No. 24
- Utility
- Born: September 27, 2001 (age 25); The Colony, Texas, U.S.

Teams
- Oklahoma (2021–2024); Oklahoma City Spark (2024–2025); Utah Talons (2026–present)

Career highlights and awards
- AUSL champion (2026); 4× Women's College World Series champion (2021–2024); 2× WCWS All-Tournament Team (2022, 2023); 3× First Team All-American (2021–2023); Big 12 Player of the Year (2023); 4× First team All-Big 12 (2021–2024); All-Big 12 Freshman team (2021)
Medals
Women's softball
Representing the United States
World Games
Gold medal – first place	2025 Chengdu	Team
U-19 Women's Softball World Cup
Gold medal – first place	2019 Irvine	Team
USA Softball International Cup
Bronze medal – third place	2019 Columbus	Team

Jayda Leighann Coleman (born September 27, 2001) is an American professional softball player for the Utah Talons of the Athletes Unlimited Softball League (AUSL). She played college softball at Oklahoma where she won the Women's College World Series championship four consecutive years.

== High school career ==
Coleman attended The Colony High School in The Colony, Texas. During her high school career she was a six-time All-State honoree and three-time All-American. During the 2017 season, she hit .653 with 12 home runs and 81 hits in 40 games, and she led the Dallas-Fort Worth area with 74 runs scored and 53 stolen bases as The Colony won the Class 5A state championship. Following the season she was named MaxPreps National Freshman of the Year.

During her senior year, she batted .717 with 42 runs scored, 41 steals, 29 RBI and 10 triples. She also was 12–0 in the circle with a 0.89 ERA and 75 strikeouts in 55 innings of work before the season was canceled due to the COVID-19 pandemic. Following the season, she was named the 2019–20 Gatorade Softball Player of the Year. She finished her career with a .702 batting average, 279 career hits, 261 runs, and 209 stolen bases and holds the state record for most runs all-time in the Dallas area. She was the consensus No. 1 recruit in her class.

== College career ==
Coleman began her collegiate career for the Oklahoma Sooners in 2021. Coleman was named the Big 12 Player of the Week for the week ending May 11, 2021. She finished the weekend batting .625 with six RBIs, one home run, one double and nine putouts from centerfield. She finished the season with a .478 batting average, with 46 RBI, 66 runs scored, 31 walks, eight home runs and 19 stolen bases, with a team-best .584 on-base percentage. Her on-base percentage and stolen bases ranked first in the Big 12 and she was second behind her teammate Tiare Jennings in runs scored and batting average. She ranked in the top 10 nationally in runs per game (3rd), doubles (4th) on-base percentage (5th) and batting average (8th).

During game three of the championships series at the 2021 Women's College World Series, Coleman was 2-for-3 with a home run and three RBI to help the Sooners win the national championship. Following an outstanding season she was named first team All-Big 12, all-Big 12 Freshman team, and first team All-American. She was also named a top-three finalist for NFCA National Freshman of the Year.

During her sophomore year in 2022, she batted .429, with seven home runs, 37 RBIs, a .590 on-base percentage and led the team with 13 stolen bases. Her .590 on-base percentage ranked third in the NCAA. In the field, she had a perfect 1.000 fielding percentage with 32 putouts and three assists. During conference play, she held a conference-best on-base percentage of .614 with 17 walks, four stolen bases and 21 runs, including one home run, two doubles and eight RBIs. Following the season she was named a first-team All-American.

During her junior year in 2023, she led the Big 12 in on-base percentage, runs per game, slugging percentage and total bases. Following the season she was named Big 12 Conference Softball Player of the Year. She helped lead Oklahoma to their third consecutive national championship.

During her senior year in 2024, she started all 65 games and hit .385 with nine doubles, one triple, 13 home runs, and 44 RBI. Coleman was 0-for-3 in game one of the 2024 Women's College World Series semifinals against Florida. During game two she was 1-for-3 with a bunt single and a walk, and struck out in the first inning and popped up to short in the sixth. Prior to her final at-bat, Alyssa Brito prayed over Coleman. She then hit a walk-off home run in the bottom of the eighth inning to help Oklahoma advance to the Women's College World Series finals. She helped lead Oklahoma to their fourth consecutive national championship.

== Professional career ==
On June 17, 2024, Coleman signed with the Oklahoma City Spark . On December 1, 2025, she was drafted third overall by the Talons in the AUSL allocation draft.

== International career ==
Coleman represented the United States at the 2019 U-19 Women's Softball World Cup. She was one of only two high-school athletes on the team and posted a .522 batting average with 12 hits, six runs, four RBIs, and won gold. She also represented the United States at the 2019 USA Softball International Cup where she posted a .375 batting average with one home run, five RBI, six runs scored, and won bronze. On August 3, 2026, Coleman won a gold medal representing the United States at the USA Softball International Cup.

== Personal life ==
Coleman was born to Deana and Cedric Coleman, and has two siblings, Ashley Wilkerson and Jhanna Coleman. Her mother competed collegiately at Texas Woman's University, while her father competed collegiately at North Central Texas College.

On January 1, 2024, Coleman's boyfriend, college football player Billy Bowman Jr., proposed to her.
