= Big 12 Conference Softball Freshman of the Year =

Big 12 Conference Freshman of the Year
- Awarded for: the most outstanding college softball freshman in the Big 12 Conference
- Country: United States

History
- First award: 1996
- Most recent: Ella Boyer, Kansas

The Big 12 Conference Softball Freshman of the Year is a college softball award given to the Big 12 Conference's most outstanding freshman player. The award has been given annually since 1996.

== Key ==
*	Awarded one of the following College National Player of the Year awards: NFCA National Freshman of the Year; Softball America Freshman of the Year

== Winners ==
Season	Player	School	Reference
1996	Jaime Foutch	Oklahoma State	
1997	Jennifer Lizama; Jodi Reeves	Nebraska; Texas	
1998	Lisa Carey	Oklahoma	
1999	Jennifer Stewart	Oklahoma	
2000	Lindsay Gardner	Texas	
2001	Kara Pierce	Kansas	
2002	Cat Osterman	Texas	
2003	Chez Sievers	Texas	
2004	Sharonda McDonald	Texas A&M	
2005	Amanda Scarborough	Texas A&M	
2006	Brette Reagan	Baylor	
2007	Kirsten Shortridge	Baylor	
2008	Rhea Taylor	Missouri	
2009	Whitney Canion	Baylor	
2010	Blaire Luna	Texas	
2011	Taylor Thom	Texas	
2012	Lauren Chamberlain	Oklahoma	
2013	Sarah Smith	Baylor	
2014	Tiarra Davis	Texas	
2015	Daniella Chavez; Paige Parker	Kansas; Oklahoma	
2016	Shay Knighten	Oklahoma	
2017	Nicole Mendes	Oklahoma	
2018	Jocelyn Alo	Oklahoma	
2019	Grace Green	Oklahoma	
2021	Tiare Jennings	Oklahoma	
2022	Jordy Bahl	Oklahoma	
2023	Kailey Wyckoff	Texas Tech	
2024	Teagan Kavan	Texas	
2025	Ilove’a Brittingham	BYU	
2026	Ella Boyer	Kansas	

== Winners by school ==
School	Winners	Years
Oklahoma	10	1998, 1999, 2012, 2015, 2016, 2017, 2018, 2019, 2021, 2022
Texas	8	1997, 2000, 2002, 2003, 2010, 2011, 2014, 2024
Baylor	4	2006, 2007, 2009, 2013
Kansas	3	2001, 2015, 2026
Texas A&M	2	2004, 2005
BYU	1	2025
Nebraska	1	1997
Oklahoma State	1	1996
Texas Tech	1	2023
Arizona	0	—
Arizona State	0	—
Houston	0	—
Iowa State	0	—
Missouri	0	—
UCF	0	—
Utah	0	—
