= Southeastern Conference Softball Freshman of the Year =

Southeastern Conference Freshman of the Year
- Awarded for: the most outstanding college softball freshman player in the Southeastern Conference
- Country: United States

History
- First award: 2000-present
- Most recent: Kendall Wells, Oklahoma

The Southeastern Conference Freshman of the Year is a college softball award given to the Southeastern Conference's most outstanding freshman player. The award has been given annually since 2000.

== Key ==
*	Awarded one of the following College National Player of the Year awards: NFCA National Freshman of the Year; Softball America Freshman of the Year

== Winners ==
Season	Player	School	Reference
2000	Lacy Prejean	Alabama	
2001	Jackie McClain	Alabama	
2002	Sara Dean; Mandy Schuerman	Auburn; Florida	
2003	Stephanie VanBrakle	Alabama	
2004	Monica Abbott	Tennessee	
2005	Courtney Bures	Mississippi State	
2006	Brittany Rogers	Alabama	
2007	Chelsea Bramlett	Mississippi State	
2008	Kelsi Dunne	Alabama	
2009	Amanda Locke	Alabama	
2010	Kayla Braud; Rachele Fico; Kat Dotson	Alabama; LSU; Tennessee	
2011	Ellen Renfroe	Tennessee	
2012	Devon Wallace	Arkansas	
2013	Bianka Bell; Gerri Ann Glasco	LSU; Georgia	
2014	Tori Finucane	Missouri	
2015	Alexis Osorio	Alabama	
2016	Amanda Lorenz	Florida	
2017	Caylan Arnold	Tennessee	
2018	Mia Davidson	Mississippi State	
2019	Montana Fouts	Alabama	
2021	Jenna Laird	Missouri	
2022	Bri Ellis	Auburn	
2023	Karlyn Pickens	Tennessee	
2024	Keagan Rothrock	Florida	
2025	Tori Edwards	LSU	
2026	Kendall Wells	Oklahoma	

== Winners by school ==
School	Winners	Seasons
Alabama	9	2000, 2001, 2003, 2006, 2008, 2009, 2010, 2015, 2019
Tennessee	5	2004, 2010, 2011, 2017, 2023
Florida	3	2002, 2016, 2024
LSU	3	2010, 2013, 2025
Mississippi State	3	2005, 2007, 2018
Auburn	2	2002, 2022
Arkansas	1	2012
Georgia	1	2013
Missouri	1	2014
Oklahoma	1	2026
Kentucky	0	—
Ole Miss	0	—
South Carolina	0	—
Texas	0	—
Texas A&M	0	—
