= Shay Knighten =

American softball player (born 1997)

Current position
- Title: Assistant coach
- Team: San Diego
- Conference: WCC

Biographical details
- Born: September 13, 1997 (age 29); Buena Park, California, U.S.

Playing career
- 2016–2019: Oklahoma
- 2019–2021: USSSA Pride
- Position: Infielder

Coaching career (HC unless noted)
- 2019–2020: Oklahoma (Student Asst.)
- 2020–present: San Diego (Asst.)

Accomplishments and honors

Awards
- 2× National Champion (2016, 2017); Women's College World Series Most Outstanding Player (2017); 2× Second Team All-American (2016, 2017); Big 12 Freshman of the Year (2016); Big 12 Player of the Year (2017); 3× All-Big 12 First Team (2016–2018); All-Big 12 Second Team (2019); All-Big 12 Freshman Team (2016)

Marshaylee Knighten (born September 13, 1997) is an American former professional softball player for the USSSA Pride and current assistant head coach for the San Diego Toreros softball team. She previously played college softball for Oklahoma, where she led the team to four consecutive Women's College World Series appearances from 2016 to 2019, and won the national championship as a freshman in 2016 and sophomore in 2017. She was named WCWS Most Outstanding Player in 2017.

== College career ==
During her freshman year in 2016, she played in 60 games with 36 starts, and led the team in batting average (.400), runs (52), hits (78), doubles (22), triples (3) and slugging percentage (.682). Her 22 doubles tied a Big 12 record, and she ranked 12th nationally with 0.37 doubles per game. She became the first freshman to lead the team in batting average since 2010. She finished the season with 13 home runs, 62 run batted in (RBI), a .397 batting average and .670 slugging percentage. During the 2016 Women's College World Series, she batted 9-19 (.474) with two home runs, and eight RBI, to help the Sooners win the national championship. Following an outstanding season, she was named Big 12 Freshman of the Year, second team All-American, and a top-three finalist for NFCA National Freshman of the Year.

During her sophomore year in 2017, she played in 70 games with 69 starts. She finished the season ranked seventh in the country in RBI (70), 23rd in hits (76), 29th in RBI per game (1.00) and 40th in total bases (122). During the 2017 Women's College World Series, she hit .350, with four runs scored, two doubles, a home run and RBI. In game one of the championship series against Florida, she hit a go-ahead three-run home run in the 17th inning to help the Sooners win the game. In game two of the championship series, she hit a go-ahead three-run double to help Oklahoma win back-to-back national championships, and was subsequently named Most Outstanding Player. Following an outstanding season, she was named Big 12 Player of the Year and second team All-American. She was also nominated for Best Championship Performance at the 2017 ESPY Awards.

During her junior year in 2018, she started 53 games where she totaled 14 games with multiple hits and seven games with multiple RBIs. During her senior year in 2019, she played in 56 games with 55 starts, she ranked second on the team with 131 putouts. During the 2019 Women's College World Series, she homered in both of Oklahoma's championship series games against UCLA, including a game-tying, two-out solo shot in the top of the seventh in game two. Following the season she was named All-Big 12 second team. She finished her career with a .360 batting average, 247 hits and 148 runs scored, and ranked fourth in sacrifice flies (10) and sixth in RBIs (197) in program history.

== Professional career ==
Knighten was drafted 20th overall by USSSA Pride in the 2019 NPF Draft. On June 10, 2019, she signed a one-year contract with the team. During her first season with the team in 2019, she batted 2–3 with a double and three RBI in the Cowles Cup championship game, to help USSSA Pride win the NPF Championship.

== Coaching career ==
On September 18, 2019, Knighten was named a student assistant coach for the Sooners. On October 7, 2020, Knighten was named an assistant coach for the San Diego Toreros softball team.

== Personal life ==
Knighten was born to Kenny and Marci Knighten. She has two sisters, Briayna and Marjani, and one brother, Marquis. Her father, Kenny, played baseball at USC, and her sister, Marjani, played softball at Nebraska and was an All-American in 2016.
