= Beachum =

Beachum is a surname. Notable people with the surname include:

- Jaysoni Beachum (born 2005), American softball player
- Kelvin Beachum (born 1989), American football player
