= Kendall Wells =

American softball player

Oklahoma Sooners – No. 1
- Catcher
- Born: Bogart, Georgia, U.S.
- Bats: Right Throws: Right

Teams
- Oklahoma (2026–present)

Career highlights and awards
- NFCA National Freshman of the Year (2026); Softball America Freshman of the Year (2026); SEC Freshman of the Year (2026); NFCA Catcher of the Year; First Team All-American (2026); All-SEC First team (2026)

Kendall Wells is an American college softball player for the Oklahoma Sooners. As a freshman in 2026, she was named NFCA National Freshman of the Year.

== High school career ==
Wells attended North Oconee High School in Bogart, Georgia where she played basketball and softball. She was named a 2024 first-team all-state selection in basketball with career averages of 12.2 points and 9.5 rebounds per game. During her sophomore year she tied the state home run record with 24. She finished her softball career with 127 hits, 55 home runs, 184 run batted in (RBIs), 148 walks, 162 runs scored and 62 stolen bases while slashing .625/.775/1.595 for a 2.370 on-base plus slugging (OPS).

== College career ==
On September 6, 2023, Wells committed to play college softball at Oklahoma. She was ranked the top catcher in her class and the No. 4 overall player. She made her collegiate debut for Oklahoma on February 5, 2026, against Arizona State, and hit a game-winning two-run home run. She began the 2026 season on a seven-game hitting streak. During the Mary Nutter Collegiate Classic, she recorded six home runs and 13 RBIs, and was subsequently named the D1Softball National Player of the Week and Softball America Freshman of the Week for the week ending February 24, 2026. On March 31, 2026 against Wichita State, she recorded her 27th home run of the season, setting a new single-season Southeastern Conference (SEC) home run record. She finished the weekend with a home run in each game, along with nine runs, nine RBIs and a 1.889 slugging percentage. She was subsequently named the SEC and D1Softball Player of the Week for the week ending April 7, 2026. On April 11, 2026, against Texas, she recorded her 31st home run of the season, setting a new NCAA Division I record for home runs by a freshman. On April 24, 2026, against Georgia, she recorded her 35th home run of the season, setting a new single-season program record, surpassing the previous record of 34 set by Jocelyn Alo. She led the SEC with 39 home runs, 81 RBIs, and a 1.030 slugging percentage. Following the season she was named the SEC Freshman of the Year, the Softball America Freshman of the Year and NFCA National Freshman of the Year. She was also named a top-ten finalist for the USA Softball Collegiate Player of the Year and the NFCA Catcher of the Year.

== Personal life ==
Wells was born to Ken and Greer Wells, and has three siblings, Karlee, Kourtney and Kamryn.
