= Keagan Rothrock =

American softball player (born 2003)

Florida Gators – No. 7
- Pitcher
- Born: January 5, 2005 (age 21); Whiteland, Indiana, U.S.

Teams
- Florida (2024–present)

Career highlights and awards
- Third Team All-American (2024); WCWS All-Tournament Team (2024); SEC Freshman of the Year (2024); Third team All-American (2026); All-SEC Second team (2024)

Keagan Rothrock (born January 5, 2005) is an American college softball pitcher for Florida. As a freshman in 2024, she was named SEC Freshman of the Year.

== High school career ==
Rothrock attended Roncalli High School in Indianapolis, Indiana. She missed her freshman season due to the COVID-19 pandemic in 2020. During the 2021 season, in her sophomore year, she posted a 24–2 record with a 0.13 earned run average (ERA), allowing 40 hits and six walks in 160 1/3 innings while striking out 364 batters, as she led the Royals to the Class 4A state championship. Offensively she hit .442 with three home runs and 21 run batted in (RBIs). Following the season she was named the Indiana Gatorade Player of the Year.

During the 2022 season, in her junior year, she posted a 28–0 record with a 0.70 ERA, allowing 51 hits and 17 walks in 163 1/3 innings while striking out 366 batters, as she led the Royals to their second consecutive Class 4A state championship. Offensively she hit .523 with 14 home runs and 55 RBIs and 1.628 OPS. Following an outstanding season she was named the Indiana Gatorade Player of the Year and Gatorade National Softball Player of the Year.

Rothrock experienced an intense pain in her calves during the fall of 2022. After a series of tests and scans came up empty, she was tested for compartment syndrome, an ailment where the muscles grow faster than the fascia tissue surrounding them. Most people experience the injury in only two compartments, however, Rothrock was among the 1% who experienced it in all four. She underwent surgery to relieve pressure in her right leg on January 13, 2023, then from her left leg on February 3, 2023. Three weeks later, stitches were removed from her left leg and the incision on her right leg was swabbed for infection. Lab results revealed an extremely rare infection in her leg that needed to be addressed immediately. She was cleared to play softball 30 minutes before the Roncalli softball team departed for its season opener. During the 2023 season, in her senior year, she posted a 25–2 record with a 0.50 ERA, allowing 62 hits in 158 innings while striking out 315 batters. Offensively she hit .490 with nine home runs and 46 RBIs and an .864 slugging percentage and led the Royals to their third consecutive Class 4A state championship game, before losing in the finals. Following the season she was named the Indiana Gatorade Player of the Year for the third consecutive year.

She finished her high school career with a 77–4 record with a 0.45 ERA and 1,080 strikeouts. She issued only 56 walks, pitched 22 no-hitters and 13 perfect games. Offensively she batted .488 over three seasons at Roncalli, with 143 hits, 26 home runs, 122 RBIs and scoring 32 runs. She only struck out 12 times in her career and drew 14 walks. She led the Royals to three consecutive IHSAA Class 4A state championship game appearances and back-to-back state titles in 2021 and 2022. She was a three-time NFCA high school All-American, three-time Indiana Gatorade Player of the Year, three-time first team all-state and first team all-county honoree.

Rothrock was ranked as the nation's No. 1 prospect by Extra Inning Softball coming out of high school and had been verbally committed to play college softball at Florida since she was in seventh grade. On November 9, 2022, she signed her National Letter of Intent to play at Florida, making her part of the top-rated recruiting class of 2023 per Extra Innings Softball.

== College career ==
As a freshman during the 2024 season, Rothrock posted a 33–8 record with a 2.48 ERA and 194 strikeouts in 248 innings. She pitched 57.2% of Florida's innings during the regular season, and 73.9% of its postseason innings pitched entering the 2024 Women's College World Series. She led the nation in wins and games started and ranked fourth nationally in innings pitched. She ranked second in Florida freshman history in wins, behind Hannah Rogers' 36 wins in 2011. On February 23, 2024, she pitched her first career no-hitter in a game against Lafayette. She struck out the side three times and finished with a season-high 13 strikeouts. This was the most strikeouts by a Florida pitcher since Kelly Barnhill struck out 17 against Ole Miss on March 29, 2019. She pitched her second career no-hitter on March 1, 2024, in a game against Cal State Fullerton. She faced the minimum 15 batters and threw just 66 pitches. The only blemish during the game was a leadoff walk issued in the bottom of the second inning, ruining a perfect game. She finished the month of February with an 8–2 record, 0.67 ERA, 0.53 WHIP, and 74 strikeouts in 62 1/3 innings, and was named Softball America Freshman Pitcher of the Month. Following the season she was named the SEC Freshman of the Year and a top-three finalist for the NFCA National Freshman of the Year.

== International career ==
She represented the United States at the 2021 Junior Pan American Games and won a gold medal. She also represented the United States at the Junior Women's World Championship, where she pitched nine innings with 19 strikeouts and allowed only one hit and won a gold medal.

== Personal life ==
Rothrock was born to Greg and Laura Rothrock. Her mother played college softball at Purdue Fort Wayne.
