= Big 12 Conference Softball Player of the Year =

College softball award

Big 12 Conference Player of the Year
- Awarded for: the most outstanding college softball player in the Big 12 Conference
- Country: United States

History
- First award: 1996
- Most recent: Sydney Stewart, Arizona

The Big 12 Conference Softball Player of the Year is a college softball award given to the Big 12 Conference's most outstanding player. The award was first given following the 1996 season, with both pitchers and position players eligible. After the 2002 season, the Big 12 Conference Softball Pitcher of the Year award was created to honor the most outstanding pitcher.

== Key ==
*	Awarded a College National Player of the Year award: the USA Softball Collegiate Player of the Year

== Winners ==
Season	Player	School	Reference
1996	Jill Most; Kendall Richards	Oklahoma; Texas A&M	
1997	Barb Wright	Missouri	
1998	Ali Viola	Nebraska	
1999	Lynette Velazquez	Oklahoma	
2000	Lisa Carey	Oklahoma	
2001	Kelli Braitsch	Oklahoma	
2002	Selena Collins	Texas A&M	
2003	Lauren Bay	Oklahoma State	
2004	Peaches James	Nebraska	
2005	Amanda Scarborough	Texas A&M	
2006	Serena Settlemier	Kansas	
2007	Norelle Dickson	Oklahoma	
2008	Megan Gibson	Texas A&M	
2009	Amber Flores	Oklahoma	
2010	Amber Flores (2)	Oklahoma	
2011	Amy Hooks	Texas	
2012	Keilani Ricketts	Oklahoma	
2013	Shelby Pendley	Oklahoma	
2014	Taylor Thom	Texas	
2015	Shelby Pendley	Oklahoma	
2016	Vanessa Shippy; Erin Miller	Oklahoma State; Oklahoma	
2017	Shay Knighten	Oklahoma	
2018	Vanessa Shippy (2)	Oklahoma State	
2019	Sydney Romero	Oklahoma	
2021	Jocelyn Alo	Oklahoma	
2022	Jocelyn Alo (2)	Oklahoma	
2023	Jayda Coleman	Oklahoma	
2024	Reese Atwood	Texas	
2025	Devyn Netz	Arizona	
2026	Sydney Stewart	Arizona	

== Winners by school ==
School	Winners	Years
Oklahoma	16	1996, 1999, 2000, 2001, 2007, 2009, 2010, 2012, 2013, 2015, 2016, 2017, 2019, 2021, 2022, 2023
Texas A&M	4	1996, 2002, 2005, 2008
Oklahoma State	3	2003, 2016, 2018
Texas	3	2011, 2014, 2024
Arizona	2	2025, 2026
Nebraska	2	1998, 2004
Kansas	1	2006
Missouri	1	1997
Arizona State	0	—
Baylor	0	—
BYU	0	—
Houston	0	—
Iowa State	0	—
Texas Tech	0	—
UCF	0	—
