= Taylor Shumaker =

American softball player (born 2006)

Florida Gators – No. 21
- Outfielder
- Born: March 16, 2006 (age 20); Fullerton, California, U.S.

Teams
- Florida (2025–present)

Career highlights and awards
- NFCA National Freshman of the Year (2025); Softball America Freshman of the Year (2025); First team All-American (2025); Second team All-American (2026); All-SEC First team (2025)

Taylor Shumaker (born March 16, 2006) is an American college softball player for Florida. As a freshman in 2025, she was named NFCA National Freshman of the Year.

== High school career ==
Shumaker attended Esperanza High School in Anaheim, California. On November 8, 2023, she committed to play college softball at Florida.

== College career ==
As a freshman during the 2025 season, Shumaker started all 60 games and hit .387 with 74 hits, 70 runs, 17 doubles, 21 home runs and 83 RBIs. On February 8, 2025, she went 2-for-2 with two home runs against No. 22 Michigan. becoming the first Florida freshman since 2008 to hit two home runs in the regular season against a ranked opponent. She finished the weekend series with nine hits, including two doubles and five home runs, 11 runs scored and 11 RBIs, and was subsequently named the SEC Freshman of the Week. She set Florida freshman records for RBIs, doubles, home runs, and runs scored. During the regional of the 2025 NCAA Division I softball tournament, she went 4-for-7, with three home runs, seven RBIs, and six runs scored. She recorded her 21st home run of the season, surpassing Brittany Shutte's record for the most home runs by a freshman in program history. Following an outstanding season she was named the Softball America Freshman of the Year and NFCA National Freshman of the Year.
