= Amanda Scarborough =

American sports broadcaster and former softball player

Amanda Marie Scarborough (born May 10, 1986) is an American sports broadcaster for ESPN and former softball player. Playing college softball at Texas A&M, Scarborough was a two-time NFCA All-American, the 2005 Big 12 Conference Player of the Year, and 2007 Big 12 Pitcher of the Year.

== Early life and college career ==
Scarborough was born in Houston and raised in Magnolia, Texas, graduating from Magnolia High School in 2004. Attending Texas A&M University, Scarborough was started at pitcher and first base from 2005 to 2008 under head coach Jo Evans.

As a freshman in 2005, Scarborough went 26–2 (11–1 in Big 12 Conference games) as a pitcher with an 0.73 earned run average and was the team's best hitter with a .405 batting average. A first-team NFCA All-American, she became the first player to earn both Freshman of the Year and Player of the Year honors from the Big 12.

Starting all 53 games played in 2006, Scarborough was Texas A&M's second-leading hitter with a .305 batting average and a first-team All-Big 12 honoree. As a pitcher, Scarborough went 15–11 with a 2.47 ERA.

One of five players to start all 60 games of 2007, Scarborough had a 26–10 record, 1.50 ERA, and .333 batting average, earning her Big 12 Pitcher of the Year, first-team NFCA All-American, and first-team All-Big 12 honors as a junior. That year, Texas A&M made the Women's College World Series for the first time in nearly 20 years.

With a .447 batting average, 4–2 record as pitcher, and 2.27 ERA, Scarborough played only 15 games (14 starts) in her senior season in 2008 before what became a career-ending foot injury early in the season. Scarborough graduated from Texas A&M with a B.A. in communication in December 2008.

Scarborough remained involved with Texas A&M softball while in graduate school, first as a graduate assistant for the 2009 season then as volunteer pitching coach in 2010. Scarborough completed her M.S. in sport management in May 2011.

== Broadcasting career ==
Beginning in 2009, Scarborough did on-air analysis for ESPN coverage of NCAA Super Regionals. Scarborough joined ESPN's on-air crew for the Women's College World Series for the first time in 2015.
