= Jordy Frahm =

American softball player (born 2002)

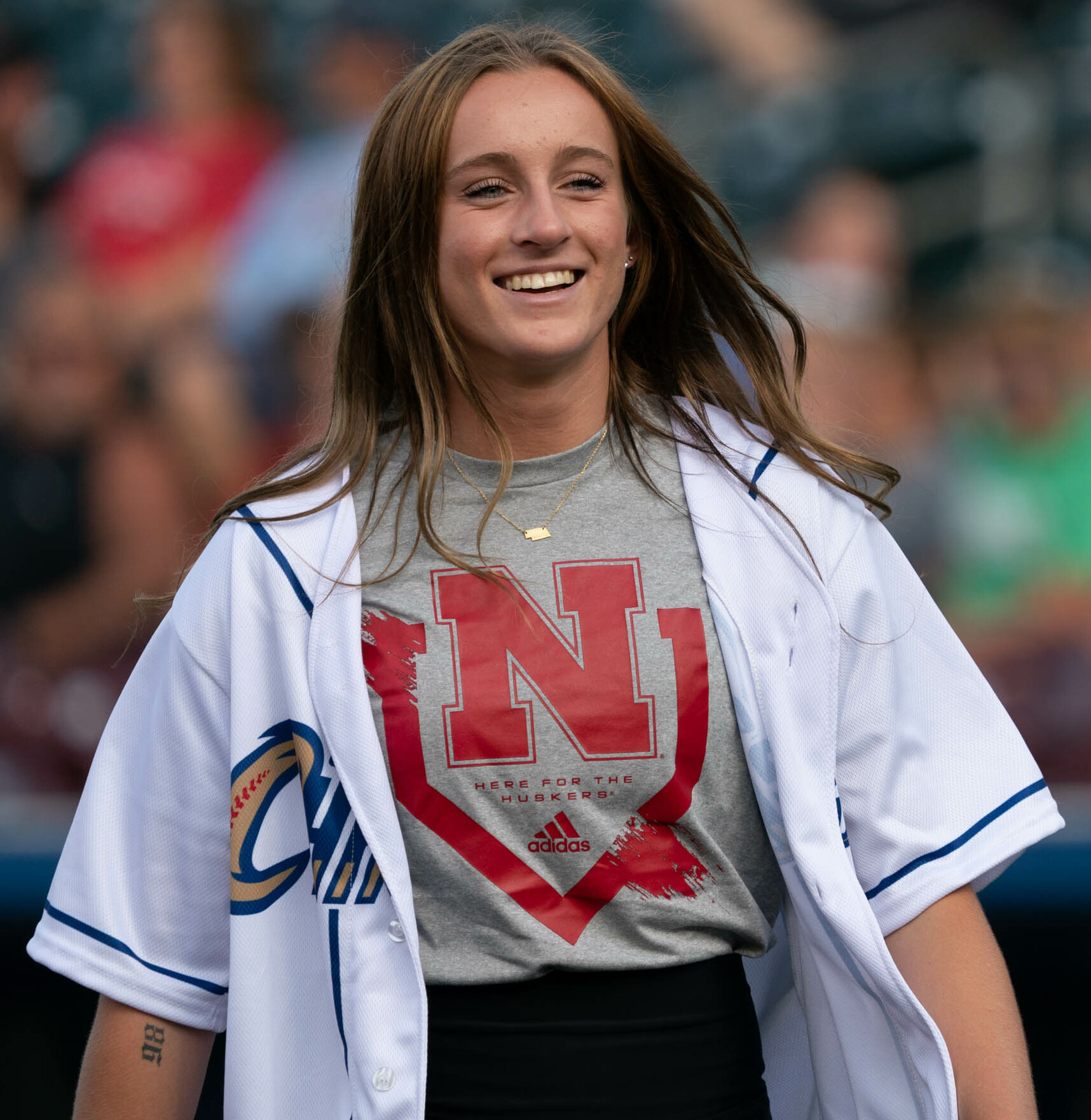
- Frahm at Werner Park in 2023

Nebraska Cornhuskers – No. 98
- Pitcher
- Born: July 24, 2002 (age 24); Papillion, Nebraska, U.S.
- Bats: Right Throws: Right

Teams
- Oklahoma (2022–2023); Nebraska (2024–2026)

Career highlights and awards
- 2× Women's College World Series champion (2022, 2023); Women's College World Series Most Outstanding Player (2023); 2× WCWS All-Tournament Team (2023, 2026); 4× First Team All-American (2022, 2023, 2025, 2026); USA Softball Collegiate Player of the Year (2026); 2× NFCA National Player of the Year (2025, 2026); Big Ten Player of the Year (2025); 2× Big Ten Pitcher of the Year (2025, 2026); NFCA National Freshman of the Year (2022); Softball America Freshman of the Year (2022); Big 12 Freshman of the Year (2022); 2× Big 12 Pitcher of the Year (2022, 2023); 2× First team All-Big 12 (2022, 2023); 2× First team All-Big Ten (2025, 2026)

Jordyn Makensey Frahm (née Bahl; born July 24, 2002) is an American college softball pitcher for Nebraska. As a freshman at Oklahoma she was named NFCA National Freshman of the Year in 2022. She was also named a two-time NFCA National Player of the Year in 2025 and 2026.

== High school career ==
Frahm attended Papillion-La Vista Senior High School in Papillion, Nebraska. She led the Monarchs to three consecutive Class A state titles and was awarded All-State honors all four years. During her junior year in 2020, she posted a 27–0 record with a 0.15 ERA, surrendering just 27 hits and 24 walks in 139 innings pitched, while striking out 299 batters. She also batted .581 with 59 RBI, tying the Class A single-season record with 22 home runs. Following an outstanding season, she was named the Nebraska Softball Player of the Year.

During her senior year in 2021, she posted a 27–0 record with a 0.10 ERA, surrendering just 27 hits and 15 walks in 137 innings pitched, while striking out 316 batters. She also batted .510 with 20 home runs and 55 RBI. Following an outstanding season she was named Nebraska Softball Player of the Year for the second consecutive year and Gatorade National Softball Player of the Year.

Frahm finished her career at Papillion with a 95–3 record, 0.63 ERA, and 978 strikeouts, in 523 innings. She also recorded 63 complete games and one perfect game. Bahl was ranked as the nation's No. 1 recruit in the Class of 2021 by Softball America and Extra Inning Softball.

== College career ==
=== Oklahoma ===
Bahl made her collegiate debut for Oklahoma on February 10, 2022, in a game against UC Santa Barbara. She struck out four of the eight batters she faced in 2 2/3 innings. Sophomore Nicole May and graduate transfer Hope Trautwein combined to finish the perfect game for the Sooners. On February 25, she pitched a perfect game against Cal State Fullerton. She struck out 11 in the complete-game performance, allowing no hits or walks to the 18 batters she faced. She became the first Oklahoma freshman to pitch a perfect game since Paige Parker in 2015. She finished the regular season with a 21–1 record, with a 0.95 ERA, 199 strikeouts and 29 walks in 132 1/3 innings pitched. She allowed 18 earned runs, while holding opponents to a .137 batting average including seven shutouts.

On May 6, 2022, she suffered an injury during a pregame warm-up for the Saturday game in the regular series finale against Oklahoma State. She didn't pitch during the 2022 Big 12 Conference softball tournament due to suffering arm soreness. She pitched for the first time since returning from injury on June 2, during the first game of the 2022 Women's College World Series against Northwestern. She threw 11 pitches, and allowed two hits while recording just one out. During the Women's College World Series championship game on June 9, she allowed four hits, two runs, three walks and two strikeouts in four innings and earned the win in the title clinching game. Following an outstanding season, she was named Big 12 Freshman of the Year and Co-Big 12 Pitcher of the Year and a unanimous first-team All-Big 12 selection. She was also named a first-team All-American, the NFCA National Freshman of the Year, Softball America Freshman of the Year and a finalist for USA Softball Collegiate Player of the Year.

During the 2023 season in her sophomore year, she posted a 22–1 record with four saves. During 18 conference games, she posted a 7–0 record with a 0.70 ERA, giving up just four runs. Her seven conference wins were the most of any pitcher while her opposing batting average of .130 in Big 12 games was the lowest of any league pitcher. Following the season she was named a unanimous first-team All-Big 12 selection and the Big 12 Pitcher of the Year for the second consecutive year. During the 2023 Women's College World Series, Bahl posted a 4–0 record with one save in 24 2/3 scoreless innings and was subsequently named the Women's College World Series Most Outstanding Player. She became the first pitcher since 1992 to work at least 20 innings at the World Series without allowing a run.

=== Nebraska ===
On June 12, 2023, Bahl announced she would enter the NCAA transfer portal. During two seasons at Oklahoma she appeared in 71 games with 46 starts and posted a 44–2 record, 1.00 ERA and 397 strikeouts in 288 2/3 innings. Her ERA ranked second in Oklahoma program history and was the lowest since the pitching distance was increased from 40 to 43 feet in 1988. She also posted the second-best winning percentage (.957) and opponent batting average (.153) in program history, and ranked third in strikeouts per seven innings (9.62). On June 15, she announced she was transferring to Nebraska.

On February 8, 2024, during the opening game of the 2024 season against Washington, Bahl suffered a season-ending injury to the anterior cruciate ligament (ACL) in her left knee. She took the loss in her Husker debut, pitching 2 1/3 innings, allowing two hits, three strikeouts, three earned runs and four walks. It was later announced she would redshirt during the 2024 season and return in 2025.

During the 2025 season in her junior year, she posted a 26–8 record, with a 1.56 ERA. During conference play she posted a 10–2 record in conference play, with a 1.83 ERA. Offensively she hit .467, with 59 runs, 70 hits, 59 RBIs, 16 doubles and 19 home runs during the regular season. She became the first Husker in program history to record 15 doubles and 15 home runs in the same season. Following the season she became the first player in Big Ten Conference history to be named Player of the Year and Pitcher of the Year in the same season. During the first game of the 2025 NCAA Division I softball tournament against UConn, she hit a home run and became the fourth player in NCAA Division I history to surpass 20 wins and 20 home runs in the same season. She was also named the NFCA National Player of the Year. In May 2025, Frahm completed her Bachelor of Science degree in education and human sciences.

During the 2026 season in her senior year, she posted a 21–6 record, with a 1.37 ERA, 251 strikeouts and 12 saves. Her 12 saves led the nation, and set a Nebraska single-season saves record, surpassing the previously record held by current head coach Rhonda Revelle. She helped lead Nebraska to the Women's College World Series for the first time since 2013. Following the season she was named Big Ten Pitcher of the Year for the second consecutive year. She was also named the USA Softball Collegiate Player of the Year and NFCA National Player of the Year for the second consecutive year. On May 31, 2026, during the 2026 Women's College World Series against Texas, she hit a lead off home run for her 20th of the season. She became the first player in NCAA Division I history to record 20 home runs and 20 wins in multiple seasons.

== Coaching career ==
On June 5, 2026, Frahm was named an assistant coach for Nebraska.

== Personal life ==
On August 2, 2025, Frahm married former Nebraska baseball player Trey Frahm. A university spokesperson confirmed to Sports Illustrated that she took her new husband's surname. On June 1, 2026, one day after competing in the 2026 Women's College World Series, Frahm posted on Instagram that she is expecting their first child.
