= Sydney Romero =

American softball player

Current position
- Team: Oklahoma City Spark

Biographical details
- Born: March 8, 1997 (age 29); San Diego, California, U.S.
- Education: Oklahoma

Playing career
- 2016–2019: Oklahoma
- 2019: USSSA Pride
- 2025: Utah Talons
- 2026–present: Oklahoma City Spark
- Position: Third baseman

Coaching career (HC unless noted)
- 2020–2022: Oklahoma (Grad. Asst.)
- 2023: Duke (Asst.)
- 2023–2026: Oregon (Asst.)
- 2027–present: Oregon (Assoc.)

Accomplishments and honors

Awards
- AUSL champion (2025); All-NPF Team (2019); 2× Women's College World Series champion (2016, 2017); 2× WCWS All-Tournament Team (2016, 2019); 2× NFCA First-team All-American (2018, 2019); 2× All-Big 12 First team (2018, 2019); 2× All-Big 12 Second team (2016, 2017); Big 12 Player of the Year (2019)

Sydney Joy Romero (born March 8, 1997) is a Mexican American professional softball player for the Oklahoma City Spark of the Athletes Unlimited Softball League (AUSL) and current associate head coach for Oregon. She played college softball for the Oklahoma Sooners, where she set numerous program records and led the Sooners to four consecutive Women's College World Series appearances from 2016 to 2019, and won the national championship as a freshman in 2016 and sophomore in 2017. She played professionally for the USSSA Pride of National Pro Fastpitch. She represented Mexico at the 2020 Summer Olympics.

== Early life ==
Romero attended Vista Murrieta High School, where she was a three-time First-Team All-Southwestern League honoree, and was named a 2014 Underclass All-American.

== College career ==
During her freshman year in 2016, Romero played in 64 games, where she struck out just four times in 211 at-bats on the season, giving her the third-best strikeout ratio in program history at 52.75 at-bats per strikeout. She was named to the All-Big 12 Freshman Team, and named a NFCA Freshman of the Year finalist. During the 2016 Women's College World Series, Sydney and the Sooners faced her sister Sierra and the Michigan Wolverines during the second round. Sydney went 2-for-3, including a solo home run, with two runs scored, a walk and a stolen base in a 7–5 victory for the Sooners. During the finals of the World Series against Auburn, Romero hit a three-run home run in game 1 of the best-of-three championship series, to help the Sooners win the game and capture the championship.

During her senior year in 2019, Romero finished the regular season leading the Big 12 Conference in batting average (.431), home runs (17), RBIs (51) and total bases (144), while ranking second in slugging percentage (.862), runs scored (55) and hits (72). She also led the nation with 176 total bases and ranked second nationally with 90 hits. Her 176 total bases and 42 extra-base hits ranked second all-time in single-season Oklahoma program history. On May 10, 2019, Romero recorded her 57th career double to set a Sooners program record, surpassing the previous record of 56 set by Lisa Carey in 2001. Following an outstanding season, she was named the Big 12 Player of the Year, and was a top three finalist for the USA Softball Collegiate Player of the Year award. She was also named a unanimous All-Big 12 First Team selection, and a First-Team All-American. Romero finished her Sooner career as the leader in at-bats (853) and doubles (58) and tied for first with 13 sacrifice flies; second in hits (320), extra-base hits (121) and total bases (558); third in games played (258); fourth in RBIs (215); fifth in batting average (.375), runs scored (229) and home runs (54); sixth in assists (367) and seventh in slugging percentage (.654).

== Professional career ==
On April 16, 2019, Romero was drafted third overall by the USSSA Pride in the 2019 NPF Draft. On June 11, 2019, she was signed to a two-year contract by the USSSA Pride. She was named the Player of the Week for the week ending July 28, 2019. During the week she went 7-for-13, with eight runs, one double, one home run, five RBI, two walks, and three stolen bases. She was named the Rookie of the Week for the week ending August 11, 2019. During the week she went 11-for-22, with four runs, two doubles, one home run, five RBI, two walks and a stolen base.

On January 29, 2025, Romero was drafted in the eleventh round, 41st overall, by the Talons in the inaugural Athletes Unlimited Softball League draft. During the 2025 AUSL season, she hit .308 with six doubles, one home run and seven RBI. On July 27, 2025, during game two of the championship series against the Bandits, Romero hit the game-winning home run in the top of the sixth inning to help the Talons win the inaugural AUSL championship. After being left unprotected by the Talons, on December 1, 2025, she was drafted fifth overall by the Oklhaoma City Spark in the AUSL expansion draft.

== Coaching career ==
On September 18, 2019, Romero was named a student assistant for the Oklahoma Sooners softball program.

On July 1, 2022, Romero was named an assistant coach for the Duke Blue Devils softball program. She served as the team's hitting and infield coach and helped lead Duke to a 48–12 record and hosted an NCAA Super Regional for the first time in program history.

On June 25, 2023, Romero was named an assistant coach for the Oregon Ducks softball program. On July 7, 2026, she was promoted to associate head coach for Oregon.

== Personal life ==
Romero is the daughter of Michael and Melissa Romero, and has three siblings. She is the younger sister of professional softball player Sierra Romero. Her younger brother, Mikey Romero was drafted in the first round, 24th overall, by the Boston Red Sox in the 2022 Major League Baseball draft. She is of Mexican and Chamorro descent.
