= Taylor Thom =

Taylor Thom is a shortstop for the Dallas Charge, a softball team based in Dallas, TX as a member of the National Pro Fastpitch (NPF).

== Early and personal life ==
Taylor Ann Thom was born to parents Thomas and Sheri Thom on September 11, 1991, in Cedar Park, TX. She grew up with two brothers, Mason and Ethan. Thom began playing softball at the age of five. She attended Vista Ridge High School and played select softball for the Texas Blaze organization. The 5'5" shortstop bats right-handed, throws right-handed, and wears jersey number eleven. Thom now plays for the Dallas Charge and the United States National Softball Team, Team USA.

== Vista Ridge High School ==
Thom accomplished many things both on the field and in the classroom at Vista Ridge. Thom was a four time academic all-district selection and led a team to University Interscholastic League State regionals in 2007 and 2008 and to the semifinals in 2009. As a freshman Thom was chosen as the 16-5A Newcomer of the Year. Thom was a four time all-district softball selection, three time All-State selection by the Texas Girls Coaches Association (2008–2010), four time Austin American-Statesman All Centex honoree which included an MVP award in 2010, and a three time Hill County News Dazzling Dozen honoree. Thom continued her success in the 16-5a district with an MVP award in 2010 and Offensive Player of the Year in 2008 and 2009. She had a strong finish her senior year with a .528 batting average, 50 runs scored, 21 RBIs, 15 doubles, and 34 stolen bases. Her high school coach, Robin Brady, stated, "I've never seen any softball player with an arm as strong as hers".

== Select Softball ==
Thom played select softball for the Texas Blaze organization during her high school years under Coach J.B. Blimp. She led her team to 13th place at Amateur Softball Association 18 and under Gold Nationals 2010 and 3rd place at 18 and under Colorado Fireworks 2010.

== University of Texas ==
Thom left her mark at the University of Texas from 2011 to 2014. She started her freshman year by winning the Big 12 Freshman of the Year, followed by an NFCA all-Central Region Second Team honor and an all-Big 12 First Team selection. Her senior year suffered a small downturn with a hitting slump, but turned around in her junior year. In her junior year she led her team to the semifinals of the Women's College World Series, set the UT program record with sixty six RBIs in a single season, matched the NCAA record for grand slams in a single game against the University of Houston, matched the NCAA record for number of doubles hit in a single game against Utah State University, was chosen by the National Fastpitch Coaches Association as a third team all-American, and was an all-Big 12 First Team selection. Thom was also selected as 2013 NFCA all-Central Region First Team, and was player of the week twice that year; the week of February 18 and February 26. Her senior year she war honored by being chosen as a co-captain for the Longhorns. During her senior year she hit .417, drove in 14 runs and had a .729 slugging percentage in conference play this season. Following the season she was named Big 12 Player of the Year. Thom made sure her years at the University of Texas would not be forgotten by leaving her mark in the record book multiple times. She currently hold these career records: first in RBIs with 178, seventh in doubles hit with 37, eighth in runs scored with 122, second in homeruns with 37, and tenths in stolen bases with 41.

== Dallas Charge ==
Thom currently plays for the Dallas Charge, a team that competes in the National Pro Fastpitch (NPF), which is the only professional softball league in the United States. Thom plays under Coach Jennifer McFalls and signed with the team as a free agent right after she graduated from the University of Texas. Thom hit the first home run in Dallas Charge history in the second inning of a 5-1 win over the Pennsylvania Rebellion. Prior to playing for the Dallas Charge, Thom worked at a logistics company, but given the need for summers off to play with the team, as of 2015 she was looking to become a teacher.

== Team USA ==
Thom played for Team USA, the United States national softball team in the summer of 2013. She started as the second baseman in her first game at the World Cup. Thom sat out the following summer to recover from an injury to her shoulder that she sustained her senior year.
