= Danielle Williams (softball) =

American softball player

- Pitcher
- Born: Pleasanton, California, U.S.
- Bats: Left Throws: Left

Teams
- Northwestern (2019–2023)

Career highlights and awards
- First Team All-American (2022); Third Team All-American (2019); NFCA National Freshman of the Year (2019); Softball America Freshman of the Year (2019); Big Ten Freshman of the Year (2019); Big Ten Pitcher of the Year (2022)

Danielle Lauren Williams is an American former college softball player for Northwestern. As a freshman in 2019, she was named NFCA National Freshman of the Year.

== High school career ==
Williams attended Amador Valley High School in Pleasanton, California where she was a four-time FloSoftball All-American. As a freshman in 2015, she was named East Bay Player of the Year and Cal-Hi Sports' Freshman of the Year. As a senior in 2018, she posted a 21–4 record with a 0.59 ERA and 363 strikeouts in 178 innings. She led Amador to the NCS Division I title in 2018, pitching 28 scoreless innings and giving up just eight hits with six walks and 58 strikeouts in four games. Following an outstanding season she was named The Chronicle's 2018 Metro Player of the Year.

== College career ==
Williams made her collegiate debut for Northwestern in 2019. During her debut on February 8, 2019, she pitched a one-hit shutout, striking out five and was one out away from pitching a no-hitter. During her freshman year, she posted a 31–8 record with a 1.55 ERA, 317 strikeouts, 26 complete games and 13 shutouts in 230 innings. She finished the regular season ranked first in the Big Ten in complete games (26), shutouts (13), and batting average against (.163), tied for first in wins (31), and ranked second in the conference in innings pitched (230.2), strikeouts (317), and games started (36). Her 31 wins ranked tied for third in the nation, while her 13 shutouts ranked fifth. During the 2019 NCAA Division I softball tournament, she helped Northwestern advance to the Super Regionals for the first time since 2008. Following an outstanding season, she was named Big Ten Freshman of the Year, Softball America Freshman of the Year and NFCA National Freshman of the Year. She was also named a third-team All-American. She became the sixth freshman player in program history to earn All-American status.

During her sophomore year in 2020 she posted a 4–6 record with a 3.57 ERA, 86 strikeouts and five complete games in 62 2/3 innings in a season that was cancelled due to the COVID-19 pandemic. She led the team in innings pitched and strikeouts, and tied for the team lead in wins. During her junior year in 2021 she posted a 17–7 record with a 2.21 ERA, 191 strikeouts, 16 complete games and six shutouts in 158 1/3 innings. She led the team in ERA, wins, WHIP, innings pitched and strikeouts. On April 16, 2021, she pitched the fifth perfect game in Northwestern history. This was the first perfect game for Northwestern in 16 years, and the first seven-inning perfect game since Lisa Ishikawa in 1984.

During her senior year in 2022, she posted a 25–3 record, with a 1.49 ERA, 270 strikeouts, 19 complete games and 10 shutouts during the regular season. She won the pitching triple crown in the Big Ten after leading the conference in ERA (1.49), strikeouts (270), and wins (25), in 187 2/3 innings. On March 20, 2022, she pitched her second career no-hitter in a game against Michigan State. She became the 11th pitcher in program history to throw multiple no-hitters in their career. During conference play, she led the Big Ten with a 14–2 record and 139 strikeouts, while ranking fourth with a 1.99 ERA. Following an outstanding season she was named a unanimous first-team All Big Ten honoree, and the Big Ten Pitcher of the Year. She became the sixth unanimous Pitcher of the Year honoree in conference history. She was also named a first-team All-American and a top-ten finalist for USA Softball Collegiate Player of the Year. During the 2022 NCAA Division I softball tournament she earned the win in all three games of the Evanston Regional, posting a 3.06 ERA and 17 strikeouts in 16 innings to help Northwestern advance to the Super Regionals for the first time since her freshman year in 2019.

During her graduate student year in 2023 she posted a 23–3 record with a 2.22 ERA and 196 strikeouts in 164 innings. Following the season she earned her fourth first team all-Big Ten award, becoming the 11th player in Big Ten history and the third Wildcat to do so. She finished her career at Northwestern as the program's all-time leader in wins with 106, and fourth in program history with 1,123 strikeouts.

== Personal life ==
Williams was born to Mike and Jenny Williams. Her older sister Krista played college softball at Northwestern from 2014 to 2017.
