= Lauren Chamberlain =

American softball player

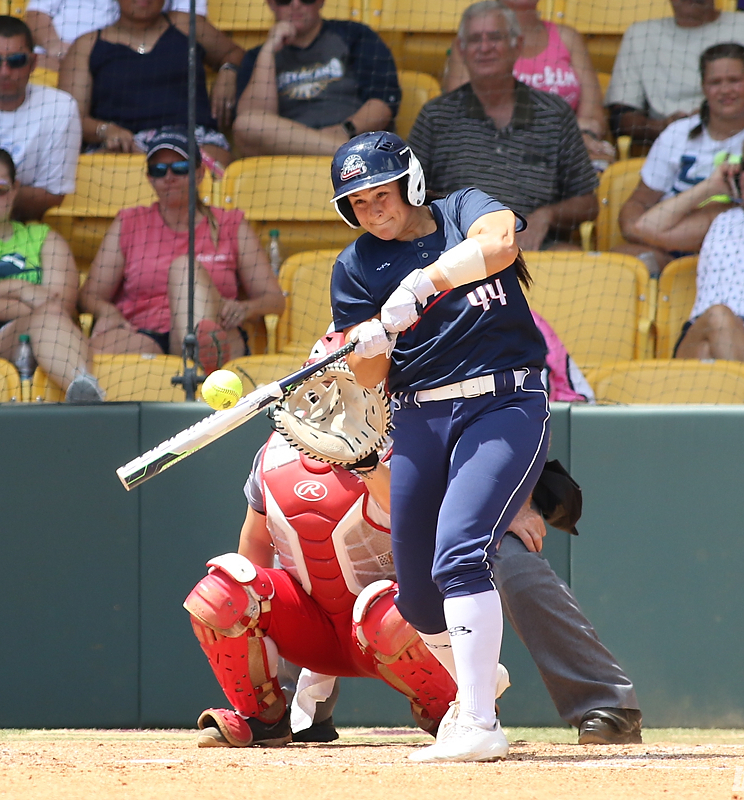
- Chamberlain in 2017

USSSA Pride – No. 44
- First baseman
- Born: July 2, 1993 (age 32); Orange, California, U.S.
- Bats: Right Throws: Right

Teams
- Oklahoma Sooners (2012–2015); USSSA Pride (2015–2018)

Career highlights and awards
- All-NPF Team (2018); Women's College World Series champion (2013); WCWS All-Tournament Team (2012, 2013); NFCA All-American First Team (2012, 2013, 2015); NFCA All-American Third Team (2014); First Team All-Region (2012, 2013, 2014, 2015); 3× All-Big 12 First Team; Big 12 Freshman of the Year (2012); 8× Big 12 Player of the Week

Lauren Nicole Chamberlain (born July 2, 1993) is an American retired softball infielder. Chamberlain played college softball for the Oklahoma Sooners softball from 2012 to 2015. A collegiate All-American, she was part of the 2013 Women's College World Series championship team. She is the NCAA Division I career leader in slugging percentage. She also holds the school and Big 12 Conference career lead in RBIs, walks, total bases and runs. She was drafted #1 and played professional softball for the USSSA Pride of National Pro Fastpitch from 2015 to 2018, winning a title in her final season in 2018.

== College career ==
Born in Orange, California and raised in Trabuco Canyon, Chamberlain graduated from El Toro High School in Lake Forest.

At the University of Oklahoma, Chamberlain played at first base for the Oklahoma Sooners from 2012 to 2015.

As a freshman in 2012, she set the Big 12 Conference's single-season home run record, hitting thirty home runs; she finished second in the nation in home runs that year. She was the first freshman in Big 12 softball history to win the Big 12 Player of the Week award three times. That season, she led her team in home runs, RBI, runs scored, and total bases; second in walks; and third in batting average, hits, doubles, and stolen bases. Following the season, she was named to the All-Big 12 and National Fastpitch Coaches Association All-American first teams and Big 12 Freshman of the Year.

In 2013, Chamberlain led the nation in four statistical categories, including home runs; home runs per game; slugging percentage; and runs per game. She ranked in the top ten nationally in four other statistical categories, including on-base percentage and batting average. She set eight single-season school offensive records, including for batting average; slugging percentage; on-base percentage; runs scored; RBI; extra-base hits; total bases; and walks. Chamberlain helped lead the Sooners to the National Championship in 2013. Following the season, she was again named a first-team all-American and a member of the all-conference first team.

In 2014, Chamberlain only played in thirty-nine games after she suffered a back injury in March and a partially-torn right PCL in May. In the games she did play, Chamberlain hit twelve home runs and led her team in on-base percentage and walks. Her fifty-one (51) walks is the sixth-best mark in Big 12 conference history. Despite the time missed due to injury, she was named a third-team all-American after the season.

Entering 2015, Chamberlain needed eighteen home runs to tie the all-time record. She led the team in six statistical categories, including runs, RBI, slugging percentage, and on-base percentage; she led the Big 12 conference in on-base percentage; slugging percentage; walks; and runs per game. On April 30, 2015, Chamberlain hit a grand slam in a game against North Texas pitcher Kenzie Grimes; with the home run, the 91st of Chamberlain's career, she moved into sole possession of first place all-time on the NCAA career home run list. She finished her career with 95 home runs. She held the NCAA career home run record until Jocelyn Alo broke her record on March 11, 2022. Following her senior season, Chamberlain was nominated for the Honda Cup Award and was named the Big 12 conference's Female Athlete of the Year. She was named to both the all-American first-team as well as the Big 12 first-team. Chamberlain retired from professional softball on May 31, 2019, prior to the NPF season.

== International career ==
Chamberlain played for Team USA in 2013. She previously spent two years (2010–11) as a member of the Junior Women's National Team and was named the 2010 USA Softball Athlete of the Year for the JWNT.

== Professional career ==
Chamberlain was selected with the #1 overall draft pick in the 2015 NPF Draft by the USSSA Pride. In thirty-eight games with the Pride during the 2015 summer season, Chamberlain hit .205 with five home runs and eleven RBI.

Chamberlain was featured in ESPN The Magazine's Body Issue 2018. She now hosts a YouTube show for Major League Baseball.

== Career statistics ==
=== Professional ===
USSSA Pride
YEAR	G	AB	R	H	BA	RBI	HR	3B	2B	SLG	BB	SO	SB	SBA
2015	38	88	8	18	.205	11	5	0	1	.386%	10	29	0	0
2016	43	108	17	23	.213	22	8	1	2	.472%	22	28	0	0
2017	44	127	21	32	.252	23	8	0	10	.520%	19	30	2	2
TOTALS	125	323	46	73	.226	56	21	1	13	.467%	51	87	2	2

=== College ===
Season	GP	GS	AB	R	H	BA	RBI	HR	3B	2B	SLG	BB	SO	SB	SBA
Oklahoma Sooners
2012	64	64	196	68	70	.357	78	30	1	10	.878%	31	29	9	9
2013	61	61	168	87	77	.458	84	30	2	16	1.113%	63	24	14	15
2014	39	39	95	45	34	.358	27	12	1	5	.811%	51	18	10	10
2015	56	56	148	72	59	.399	65	23	4	11	.993%	62	21	8	13
Career	220	220	607	272	240	.393	254	95	8	42	.948%	207	92	41	47

== Awards and honors ==
- Big 12 all-Conference First-Team (2012, 2013, 2015)
- Big 12 Champion (2012, 2013, 2014, 2015)
- NFCA First-Team All-American (2012, 2013, 2015)
- NFCA Third-Team All-American (2014)
- NCAA Player of the Year Finalist (2013, 2015)
- Big 12 Female Athlete of the Year (2015)
- ESPY's Nominee 'Best Record Breaking Performance' (2015)
- NCAA National Champion (2013)
