= Nicole Mendes =

American softball pitcher

- Utility
- Born: November 21, 1997 (age 27); Houston, Texas, U.S.

Teams
- Oklahoma (2017–2021); New York Rise (2024–present)

Career highlights and awards
- 2× Women's College World Series champion (2017, 2021); 3× WCWS All-Tournament Team (2017, 2019, 2021); Big 12 Freshman of the Year (2017); All-Big 12 freshman team (2017); All-Big 12 first team (2017)

Nicole Rangel Mendes (born November 21, 1997) is an American professional softball player for the New York Rise of the Association of Fastpitch Professionals (APF) and is a member of Mexico women's national softball team. She played college softball at Oklahoma where she helped lead the Sooners to four consecutive Women's College World Series appearances from 2017 to 2021, and won the national championship as a freshman in 2017 and redshirt senior in 2021. She represented Team Mexico at the 2020 Summer Olympics. She is also a softball analyst for ESPN.

== College career ==
During her freshman year in 2017, she played in 60 games with 52 starts, and posted a .408 batting average with 75 hits, 24 run batted in (RBI) and seven home runs. She led the team in batting average and stolen bases and tied for the lead in triples. She made her collegiate debut on February 9, 2017, with a pinch hit single and scored a run in a 7–1 victory over BYU. During the College Preview Tournament, she hit .429 with five runs scored and a .467 on-base percentage, and led the Sooners in triples (1), home runs (2), total bases (15) and slugging percentage (1.071) and tied for the team lead in RBI (4). She was subsequently named Big 12 Player of the Week for the week ending March 28, 2017.

During the regular season, she recorded a .452 batting average along with a conference-best .622 slugging percentage, 21 runs and 28 hits, and ranked fourth in stolen bases per game (0.39) and runs per game (0.86) and fifth in on-base percentage (.476). Following the season she was named Big 12 Freshman of the Year, first team All-Big 12, All-Big 12 freshman team, and All-Region first team. During the championship series at the 2017 Women's College World Series, she homered in both games against Florida, to help the Sooners win the national championship. She was subsequently named to the All-Tournament team.

During her sophomore year in 2018, she appeared in 60 games with 57 starts, and made five appearances in the circle, totaling 6.0 innings pitched with a 1–0 record. She led the team with five triples, ranking 24th nationally and tying for ninth-most in a single season in program history. Following the season she was named All-Region third team. During the 2018 NCAA Division I softball tournament, she went 5-for-7 and scored five runs at the Super Regional to help the Sooners advance to the Women's College World Series.

During her junior year in 2019, she played in 60 games with 52 starts and posted a .348 batting average with 48 hits, 39 RBIs and six home runs. She also made nine appearances in the circle, totaling 9 1/3 innings pitched. She finished the season tied for third in program history with 12 triples. During the postseason, she recorded a .306 batting average and a .316 average in the WCWS, both ranking second on the team, to help the Sooners reach the championship series at the 2019 Women's College World Series, where she was named to the All-Tournament team.

Mendes missed the start of the 2020 season due to a torn anterior cruciate ligament (ACL). Following her return from knee surgery she finished the year going 3-for-6, before the season was cancelled due to the COVID-19 pandemic. Two of her three hits were home runs. During her redshirt senior in 2021, she posted a .364 batting average, with 38 RBI and 10 home runs. Following the season she was named All-Region second team. During the Norman Regional at the 2021 NCAA Division I softball tournament, Mendes broke the program record for RBIs in a postseason game with seven. She also hit two home runs to tie the program record for homers in an NCAA regional game. She helped the Sooners advance to the 2021 Women's College World Series where she won the national championship and was named to the All-Tournament team.

Following her college playing career she joined ESPN as a softball analyst.

== Professional career ==
On May 24, 2024, she signed with the New York Rise of the AFP.

== Team Mexico ==
Mendes represented Mexico at the 2019 USA Softball International Cup. She represented Mexico at the 2020 Summer Olympics.

== Personal life ==
Mendes was born to Paul and Nina Mendes and has one sister, Brittany. She was home schooled and played travel ball for Diamond Sports Hotshots.
