= Jocelyn Alo =

American softball player (born 1998)

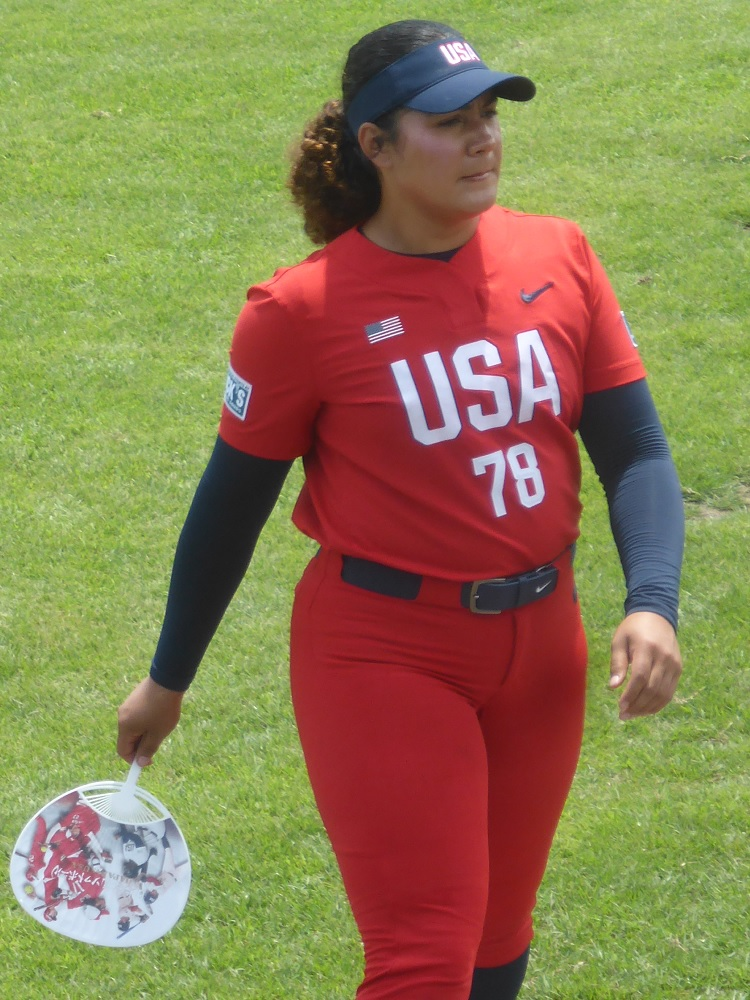
- Alo with the United States national team in 2024

Chicago Bandits
- Utility
- Born: September 23, 1998 (age 28); Hauʻula, Hawaii, U.S.
- Bats: Right Throws: Right

Teams
- Oklahoma City Spark (2023–2025); Chicago Bandits (2026–present)

Career highlights and awards
- 2× Women's College World Series (2021, 2022); Women's College World Series Most Outstanding Player (2022); 4× WCWS All-Tournament Team (2018, 2019, 2021, 2022); 2× USA Softball Collegiate Player of the Year (2021, 2022); 2× Softball America Player of the Year (2021, 2022); NFCA National Player of the Year (2022); Honda Sports Award (2022); NFCA National Freshman of the Year (2018); 3× First-team All-American (2018, 2021, 2022); Second-team All-American (2019); 2× Big 12 champion (2018, 2021); Big 12 Female Athlete of the Year (2022); 2× Big 12 Player of the Year (2021, 2022); Big 12 Freshman of the Year (2018); 4× First-team All-Big 12 (2018, 2019, 2021, 2022); Big 12 All-Freshman Team (2018)
Medals
Women's softball
Representing the United States
World Cup
| Silver medal – second place | 2024 Castions di Strada | Team |

Jocelyn Aloha Pumehana Alo (born September 23, 1998) is an American professional softball player for the Chicago Bandits of the Athletes Unlimited Softball League (AUSL). She previously played for the Oklahoma City Spark of the Association of Fastpitch Professionals (AFP). She played college softball for the Oklahoma Sooners and won consecutive Women's College World Series championships in 2021 and 2022. Alo was named 2018 NFCA National Freshman of the Year, and named USA Softball Collegiate Player of the Year in 2021 and 2022. She is the NCAA Division I career leader in home runs. Alo was drafted first overall by the Smash It Vipers in the inaugural WPF draft.

== High school career ==
Alo attended James Campbell High School in ʻEwa Beach, Hawaii where she was a two-time Gatorade State High School Player of the Year and led her team to three state championships. In 2015, she also won the HHSAA girls state championship in wrestling at 184 pounds. She retired from wrestling after her sophomore year. During her junior season, she hit .612 with eight home runs, 30 run batted in (RBI), 13 runs scored and a 1.726 on-base plus slugging (OPS). During the 2016 title game, she went 2-for-3 with a home run and four RBI and was subsequently named the tournament's Most Outstanding Player. She was also named a first team All-Oahu Interscholastic Association selection. As a senior in 2017, she hit .571 with 12 home runs, 27 RBI and a 1.449 slugging percentage.

== College career ==
During her freshman year in 2018, Alo started all 62 games (39 as designated player, 23 in left field). She led the nation in home runs (30), home runs per game (0.48) and total bases (170), and led the team in batting average (.420), home runs (30), RBIs (72), total bases (170), slugging (.977), on-base percentage (.549) and walks (14). She finished the season ranked second nationally in RBIs (72), second in total bases (159), third in slugging (.970), and fourth in RBI (71) and RBI per game (1.20). Her 30 home runs tied the Oklahoma single-season record, the Big 12 single-season record and the NCAA Division I freshman single-season record. Following an outstanding season, she was named NFCA National Freshman of the Year, Big 12 Freshman of the Year, first-team All-Big 12, All-Big 12 Freshman team, and a first-team All-American.

During her sophomore year in 2019, Alo started 59 games (56 at right field, three as designated player), where she tied for the team lead in RBIs (56), and ranked second in hits (66) and on-base percentage (.484). Following the season she was named first-team All-Big 12. During her junior year in 2020, Alo started all 24 games for the Sooners across the outfield and as designated player in a season that was cancelled due to the COVID-19 pandemic. She finished the year with a slash line of .427/.813/.506 to go with eight home runs, 21 RBIs and 22 runs, and a team-leading 61 total bases and 12 walks. She finished the 2020 season ranked first in career batting average (.404) and third in slugging percentage (.846), fourth in on-base percentage (.515) and fifth in home runs (54).

During her senior year in 2021, Alo was named Big 12 Player of the Week for the week ending March 16, 2021. In Oklahoma's five games last week, Alo hit six home runs, going 7-for-17 with 10 RBIs and 25 total bases. She hit .412 with a 1.471 slugging percentage. Alo was again named Big 12 Player of the Week for the week ending March 30, 2021. She finished the weekend with a slash line of .800/.917/2.400 to go with two home runs, four extra-base hits and seven RBIs. She was also walked seven times in her 12 plate appearances but still managed to go 4-for-5 with 12 total bases.

On April 3, 2021, Alo's 40-game hitting streak came to an end, after she finished the game hitting 0-for-1 with two walks. Her hitting streak was the longest in Oklahoma program history, and was three games short of the all-time NCAA Division I record of 43 games set by Sara Graziano in 1994. Alo, led the nation in home runs (27) and slugging percentage (1.120), ranked second in RBI (75), fifth in batting average (.479), and sixth in runs per game (1.23). Following an outstanding season, she was named Big 12 Player of the Year, first-Team All-Big 12, USA Softball Collegiate Player of the Year and Softball America Player of the Year. She was also named Jim Thorpe Athlete of the Year. On June 5, 2021, during the 2021 Women's College World Series, Alo hit her 31st home run of the season, setting a new Oklahoma program record for home runs in a season, surpassing the previous record of 30 set by Lauren Chamberlain in 2012.

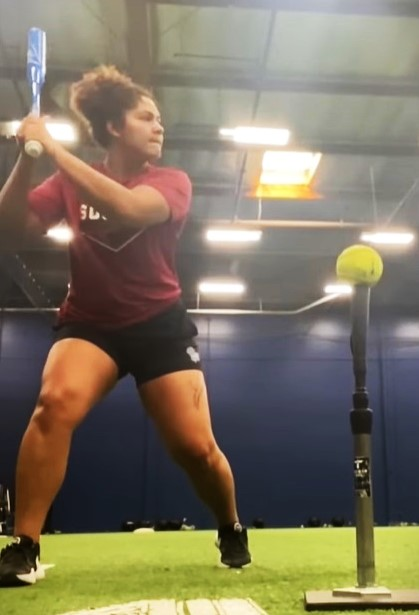
Alo trains in 2022

On February 20, 2022, Alo hit her 95th career home run, tying the NCAA record. On March 11, 2022, during the Rainbow Wahine Classic in her home state of Hawaii, she hit her 96th career home run, setting the new NCAA record, surpassing the previous record set by Lauren Chamberlain. She finished the regular season with a .476 batting average, 24 home runs, 11 doubles and 61 RBIs, including two grand slams. She led the nation in home runs (34), slugging percentage (1.212) and on-base percentage (.646) while ranking second in batting average (.512) and RBIs (85). Following an outstanding season, she was again named Big 12 Player of the Year, USA Softball Collegiate Player of the Year and Softball America Player of the Year; she was also named a unanimous first-team All-American, NFCA National Player of the Year, and won the Best College Athlete, Women's Sports ESPY award and the Honda Sports Award for softball. With a home run on June 4, during the second round of the 2022 Women's College World Series, she became the first player in NCAA Division I history to record three 30-home run seasons.

Alo finished her career at Oklahoma as the NCAA's all-time home run leader with 122 and finished second to Jenny Dalton-Hill (328) in career RBI with 323. She also is the NCAA leader in slugging percentage (.987) and total bases. She is Oklahoma's all-time leader in home runs, RBI, batting average and on-base percentage.

=== College statistics ===
| Season | GP | GS | R | H | BA | RBI | HR | 3B | 2B | SLG | BB | SO | SB | SBA |
Oklahoma Sooners
| 2018 | 62 | 62 | 64 | 73 | 0.420 | 72 | 30 | | | | 49 | 19 | 4 | 5 |
| 2019 | 59 | 59 | 40 | 66 | 0.379 | | 16 | | | | 30 | 20 | 1 | 3 |
| 2020 | 24 | 24 | 22 | 32 | 0.427 | | 8 | | | | 12 | 5 | 2 | 2 |
| 2021 | 60 | 60 | 71 | 87 | 0.475 | | 34 | | | | 38 | 16 | 3 | 3 |
| 2022 | 62 | 62 | 84 | 85 | 0.515 | 85 | 34 | 0 | 13 | 1.212 | 54 | 19 | 2 | 5 |
| Career | 267 | 267 | 281 | 343 | 0.445 | 323 | 122 | 1 | 50 | 0.987 | 183 | 79 | 12 | 18 |

== Professional career ==
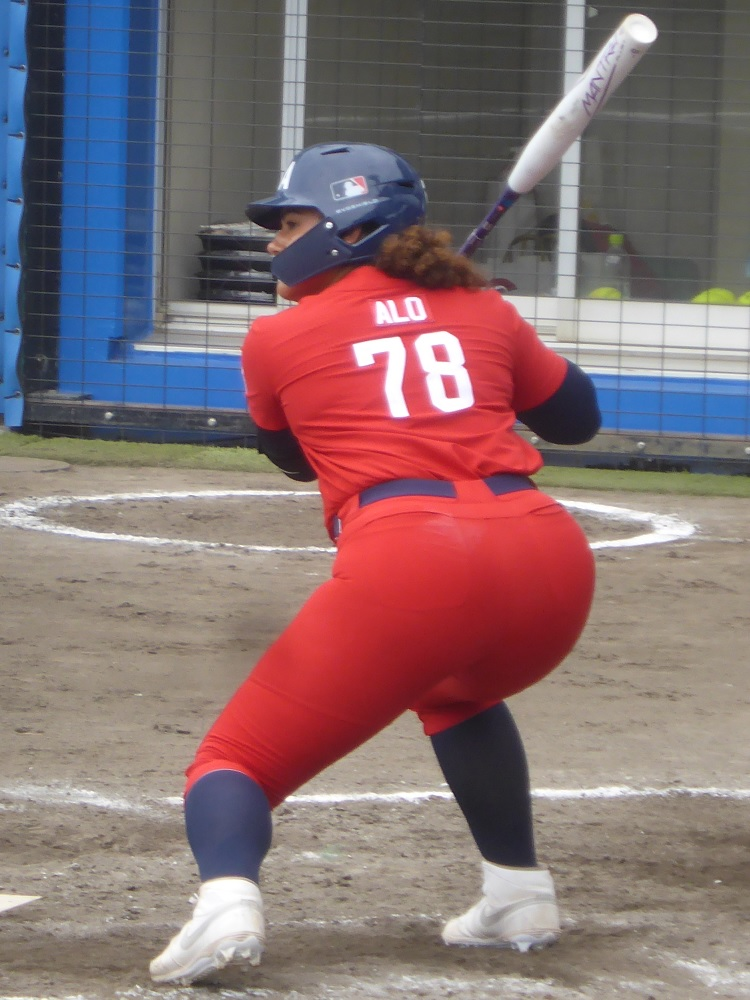
Alo with the United States national team on July 6, 2024

Alo was drafted first overall by the Smash It Sports Vipers in the inaugural Women's Professional Fastpitch draft. On June 13, 2022, she signed with the Vipers.

On November 3, 2022, she was traded by the Vipers to the Oklahoma City Spark in exchange for draft picks and cash considerations. She was subsequently signed to a three-year contract with the Spark.

She competed in the 2024 AUX Softball competition, where she finished in second place with 1,338 points on the leaderboard, trailing Bubba Nickles by only six points in the closest finish in Athletes Unlimited Softball history. She finished the season with a .389 average, a .500 on-base percentage, and the best slugging percentage of .944. She also set an AUX single-season record with six home runs.

On December 1, 2025, she was drafted in the second round, tenth overall, by the Bandits in the AUSL allocation draft.

== Savannah Bananas ==
On May 27, 2023, Alo became the first woman to play for the Savannah Bananas, getting an at bat in one of their games where she would strike out. In April 2024 it was announced that Alo became the first female member of the Savannah Bananas, by signing a one-month contract with the team.

== International career ==
Alo represented the United States at the 2024 Women's Softball World Cup and won a silver medal.

== Personal life ==
Alo was born to Levi and Andrea Alo, and is of Samoan and Hawaiian descent. Her father played college football and her mother played college softball at Laney College. Alo has three sisters named Sabrina, Lorraine, and Sophia. Her sister, Lorraine, played college softball at Fresno State and Portland State and Sophia played college softball at UTSA.
