= NFCA Catcher of the Year =

College softball award

- Awarded for: Best catcher in college softball
- Country: United States
- Presented by: Diamond Sports

History
- First award: 1997
- Most recent: Kendall Wells, Texas

The NFCA Catcher of the Year is an award given by Diamond Sports to the best college softball catcher from an NFCA member institution. A committee of elected head coaches selects the winner of the award.

== Winners ==
Year	Player	School	Ref
1997	Leah Braatz	Arizona	
1998	Leah Braatz (2)	Arizona	
1999	Stacey Nuveman	UCLA	
2000	Keri McCallum	Mississippi State	
2001	Stacey Nuveman (2)	UCLA	
2002	Stacey Nuveman (3)	UCLA	
2003	Kristen Rivera	Washington	
2004	Kristen Rivera (2)	Washington	
2005	Kristen Rivera (3)	Washington	
2006	Haley Woods	California	
2007	Killian Roessner	LSU	
2008	Chelsea Bramlett	Mississippi State	
2009	Chelsea Bramlett (2)	Mississippi State	
2010	Chelsea Bramlett (3)	Mississippi State	
2011	Kaylyn Castillo	Arizona State	
2012	Jessica Shults	Oklahoma	
2013	Amber Freeman	Arizona State	
2014	Taylor Edwards	Nebraska	
2015	Lexie Elkins	Louisiana	
2016	Lexie Elkins (2)	Louisiana	
2017	Kendyl Lindaman	Minnesota	
2018	Gwen Svekis	Oregon	
2019	Dejah Mulipola	Arizona	
2020	Not awarded due to the COVID-19 pandemic		
2021	Dejah Mulipola (2)	Arizona	
2022	Mia Davidson	Mississippi State	
2023	Terra McGowan	Oregon	
2024	Jocelyn Erickson	Florida	
2025	Reese Atwood	Texas	
2026	Kendall Wells	Oklahoma	
