= 2015 America East Conference softball tournament =

American college softball tournament

- Teams: 4
- Format: Double-elimination tournament
- Finals site: University Field; Stony Brook, New York
- Champions: Binghamton
- Runner-up: Stony Brook

The 2015 America East Conference softball tournament was held at University Field on the campus of Stony Brook University in Stony Brook, New York from May 7 through May 9, 2015. The tournament earned the America East Conference's automatic bid to the 2015 NCAA Division I softball tournament. The tournament only had the championship series broadcast. The championship was available on AmericaEast.tv with Andrew Bogush and Scott Greene providing the call.

== Tournament ==
1st Round
1 | Stony Brook | 2
4 | Maine | 0
2 | Albany | 3
3 | Binghamton | 5
Lower round 1
2 | Albany | 7
4 | Maine | 10

Semifinals
1 | Stony Brook | 16
3 | Binghamton | 3
Lower final
3 | Binghamton | 8^{(6)}
4 | Maine | 0

Championship
1 | Stony Brook | 2 | 3
3 | Binghamton | 5 | 9

- All times listed are Eastern Daylight Time.
