= Jaysoni Beachum =

American softball player (born 2005)

Florida State Seminoles – No. 42
- Infielder
- Born: January 3, 2005 (age 21); Tallahassee, Florida, U.S.

Teams
- Florida State (2024–present)

Career highlights and awards
- NFCA National Freshman of the Year (2024); Softball America Freshman of the Year (2024); ACC Freshman of the Year (2024); Third team All-American (2026); First team All-ACC (2024)

Jaysoni Beachum (born January 3, 2005) is an American college softball player for Florida State. As a freshman in 2024, she was named NFCA National Freshman of the Year.

== High school career ==
She attended Florida State University School in Tallahassee, Florida.

== College career ==
As a freshman during the 2024 season, Beachum led the team in batting average (.417), hits (78), home runs (16), RBI (66) and on-base percentage (.509) She broke the school's freshman RBI record with 66 and posted the third-highest batting average in program history. Following an outstanding season she was named the ACC Freshman of the Year, NFCA National Freshman of the Year, Softball America Freshman of the Year. She was also named a top-ten finalist for the USA Softball Collegiate Player of the Year. She became the first finalist from Florida State since Jessi Warren and Jessica Burroughs in 2017, and the first true freshman in program history to be named a finalist for the award.
