= Oklahoma Sooners softball =

Women's college softball team

Oklahoma Sooners Softball
- 2027 Oklahoma Sooners softball team
- Founded: 1975 (51 years ago)
- University: University of Oklahoma
- Athletic director: Roger Denny
- All-time Record: 2,015–794–2 (.717)
- Head coach: Patty Gasso (31st season)
- Conference: SEC
- Location: Norman, Oklahoma
- Home stadium: Love's Field (capacity: 4,200)
- Nickname: Sooners
- Colors: Crimson

NCAA Tournament champions
- 2000, 2013, 2016, 2017, 2021, 2022, 2023, 2024

NCAA WCWS runner-up
- 2012, 2019

NCAA WCWS appearances
- 2000, 2001, 2002, 2003, 2004, 2011, 2012, 2013, 2014, 2016, 2017, 2018, 2019, 2021, 2022, 2023, 2024, 2025

AIAW WCWS appearances
- 1975, 1980, 1981, 1982

NCAA super regional appearances
- 2005, 2007, 2008, 2010, 2011, 2012, 2013, 2014, 2015, 2016, 2017, 2018, 2019, 2021, 2022, 2023, 2024, 2025, 2026

NCAA Tournament appearances
- 1994, 1995, 1996, 1997, 1998, 1999, 2000, 2001, 2002, 2003, 2004, 2005, 2006, 2007, 2008, 2009, 2010, 2011, 2012, 2013, 2014, 2015, 2016, 2017, 2018, 2019, 2021, 2022, 2023, 2024, 2025, 2026

Conference tournament championships
- 1996, 2001, 2007, 2010, 2017, 2018, 2021, 2023, 2024, 2025

Regular-season conference championships
- 1996, 1999, 2000, 2009, 2012, 2013, 2014, 2015, 2016, 2017, 2018, 2019, 2021, 2022, 2023, 2025, 2026

The Oklahoma Sooners softball team represents the University of Oklahoma in NCAA Division I college softball. The team competes in the Southeastern Conference (SEC), and plays its home games at Love's Field in Norman, Oklahoma. The Sooners are currently led by head coach Patty Gasso.

Oklahoma has won their conference title 17 times, and their conference tournament 10 times, winning the Big 12 Conference tournament 9 times and the SEC tournament 1 time winner. They have been to the NCAA tournament 32 times, advanced to the NCAA Women's College World Series 18 times, and won the NCAA championship 8 times. Oklahoma also appeared in the AIAW Women's College World Series 4 times.

== History ==
The Sooners won their first national championship back in 2000. They swept Harvard, Cal-State Northridge, and Oregon State at their home regionals to advance to their first appearance in the Women's College World Series. They beat California and knocked off Southern Mississippi and Arizona to advance to the championship game against UCLA. They beat UCLA 3-1 to capture their first national title.

They hosted and won their 2013 regional. They beat Marist and Arkansas with a combined score of 41-6. They hosted again their super regionals against Texas A&M where they outscored the Aggies 18-2. In Oklahoma City, they went through 8 seeded Michigan, #10 ranked Texas, and #11 ranked Washington to reach Tennessee in the championship. Game 1 was where Lauren Chamberlain hit her iconic two-run walk-off home run after 12 innings of play. In game 2, Keilani Ricketts drove in all four runs, and Michelle Gascoigne pitched a shut out to obtain their second national title.

Once again, they hosted their regional in 2016 where they beat Wichita State and Ole Miss. They went on to host their super regional against Louisiana-Lafayette where they swept to advance to the Women's College World Series once again. In their first game in the tournament, they beat Alabama in extra innings. They faced #12 Michigan in game 2, and beat LSU in their third to face Auburn in the championship. They won 2-1 in their final game where Paige Parker threw a complete game.

In 2017, No. 10-seeded OU hosted North Dakota State, Arkansas and Tulsa in the Norman Regional. After opening play with a 3-2 loss to the Bison in nine innings, the Sooners rallied to defeat Arkansas, NDSU and Tulsa (twice) to advance to the Auburn Super Regional. In its first game against the Golden Hurricane, OU rallied from a 4-2 deficit with 10th-inning home runs by Caleigh Clifton and Sydney Romero to win 6-4 setting up a winner-take-all match-up the next day. The Sooners then dispatched Tulsa 3-0 to claim the regional title. Boosted by their resurgent play in the regional, OU defeated the Tigers 4-0 and 5-2 to advance to the WCWS. They began WCWS play with a 6-3 decision over Baylor followed by a 3-1 victory over Washington and a 4-2 defeat of Oregon to clinch a spot opposite top-seeded Florida in the Championship Series. In Game 1, OU outlasted the Gators 7-5 in a 17-inning marathon, the longest game ever played in WCWS Championship Series history. Shay Knighten's three-run, go-ahead homer in the top of the 17th provided the difference for the Sooners. Her bases-clearing, three-run double in the bottom of the second of Game 2 paced OU to a 5-4 victory earning the program its fourth national title and Knighten the WCWS' Most Outstanding Player honor.

In 2021, the Sooners hosted their regional as the No. 1 overall seed and beat Wichita State, Texas A&M, and Morgan State. They advanced to host their super regional against Washington, which they won in two games. At the Women's College World Series, they lost their first round game to James Madison University; subsequently, they won four straight elimination games to advance to the championship series, besting Georgia, UCLA, and James Madison twice. In the championship series, they lost their first game to Florida State, but returned to win games two and three to claim their fifth national championship.

In 2023, the Sooners set an NCAA Division I softball record 53-game winning streak. They finished the season with a 61–1 record and won their seventh national championship, and third consecutive championship. They became the first team to three-peat since UCLA from 1988 to 1990.

On June 6, 2024, Gasso's Sooners again defeated Texas in the national championship series, in a rematch from 2022, winning Gasso's and the school's eighth national championship. Gasso's eight national titles tied Arizona's Mike Candrea for the most by any coach in Division I softball history. With the win, Oklahoma became the first team in college softball history to four-peat.

=== Coaching history ===
Years	Coach	Record	%
1975–1976	Amy Dahl	18–16	.529
1977–1984	Marita Hynes	257–188	.578
1985–1993	Michelle Thomas	226–230	.496
1994	Jim Beitia	58–15	.795
1995–present	Patty Gasso	1,567–361–2	.812

== Championships ==
=== National championships ===
Season	Record	Head coach
2000	66–8	Patty Gasso
2013	57–4	Patty Gasso
2016	57–8	Patty Gasso
2017	61–9	Patty Gasso
2021	56–4	Patty Gasso
2022	59–3	Patty Gasso
2023	61–1	Patty Gasso
2024	59–7	Patty Gasso
8 national championships

=== Conference championships ===
Season	Conference	Record	Head coach
1996	Big 12	17–5	Patty Gasso
1999	Big 12	11–3	Patty Gasso
2000	Big 12	17–1	Patty Gasso
2009	Big 12	14–4	Patty Gasso
2012	Big 12	19–5	Patty Gasso
2013	Big 12	15–2	Patty Gasso
2014	Big 12	16–2	Patty Gasso
2015	Big 12	14–2	Patty Gasso
2016	Big 12	17–1	Patty Gasso
2017	Big 12	17–1	Patty Gasso
2018	Big 12	18–0	Patty Gasso
2019	Big 12	18–0	Patty Gasso
2021	Big 12	16–1	Patty Gasso
2022	Big 12	17–1	Patty Gasso
2023	Big 12	18–0	Patty Gasso
2025	SEC	17–7	Patty Gasso
2026	SEC	20–4	Patty Gasso
17 conference championships

=== Conference tournament championships ===
Season	Conference	Head coach
1996	Big 12	Patty Gasso
2001	Big 12	Patty Gasso
2007	Big 12	Patty Gasso
2010	Big 12	Patty Gasso
2017	Big 12	Patty Gasso
2018	Big 12	Patty Gasso
2021	Big 12	Patty Gasso
2023	Big 12	Patty Gasso
2024	Big 12	Patty Gasso
2025	SEC	Patty Gasso
10 conference tournament championships

== Records and statistics ==
=== Records by opponent ===
As of March 22, 2025

Southeastern Conference opponents
Team	TM	W–L	Last meeting
Alabama	18	8–10	W 7–3; June 2, 2019
Arkansas	30	28-2	W 10-7; March 16, 2025
Auburn	10	8-2	W 7-1; March 19, 2023
Florida	10	8-2	W 6-5; June 4, 2024
Georgia	8	4-4	W 8-0; June 5, 2021
Kentucky	11	10-1	W 7-1; March 4, 2023
LSU	19	11-8	W 3-0; April 11, 2023
Mississippi State	8	8-0	W 10-7; March 16, 2025
Missouri	98	56-42	L 1-3; March 22, 2025
Ole Miss	6	6-0	W 11-8; February 17, 2017
South Carolina	12	7-5	W 2-1; March 9, 2025
Tennessee	12	7-5	W 9-0; June 3, 2023
Texas	88	61–27	W 8-4; June 6, 2024
Texas A&M	83	53-30	W 8-0; February 24, 2023

Notable Non-Conference opponents
Team	TM	W–L	Last meeting
Tulsa	58	48–10	W 8–0; April 16, 2024
UCLA	23	10–13	W 1–0; June 1, 2024

=== NCAA Tournament seeding history ===
National seeding began in 2005. The Oklahoma Sooners have been a national seed in 20 of the 21 tournaments.

Years →	'05	'07	'08	'09	'10	'11	'12	'13	'14	'15	'16	'17	'18	'19	'21	'22	'23	'24	'25	'26
Seeds →	14	3	10	7	14	9	4	1	7	11	3	10	4	1	1	1	1	2	2	3

=== College World Series ===
Oklahoma has advanced to the Women's College World Series 18 times, winning the title in 2000, 2013, 2016, 2017, 2021, 2022, 2023, and 2024, and finishing as runner-up in 2012 and 2019.

Year	Win	Loss	Percent
2000	4	0	1.000
2001	1	2	.333
2002	0	2	.000
2003	1	2	.333
2004	1	2	.333
2011	0	2	.000
2012	4	2	.667
2013	5	0	1.000
2014	1	2	.333
2016	5	1	.833
2017	5	0	1.000
2018	2	2	.500
2019	3	3	.500
2021	6	2	.750
2022	5	1	.833
2023	5	0	1.000
2024	5	1	.833
2025	2	2	.500
Total	55	26	.679

== 2025 coaching staff ==
Name	Position	Seasons at Oklahoma
Patty Gasso	Head coach	30th
Jennifer Rocha	Associate head coach and pitching coach	5th
JT Gasso	Associate head coach and hitting coach	8th
Falepolima Steele	Assistant coach	1st
Lauren Foster	Graduate assistant	1st
Ryan Wondrasek	Director of player development	1st

== Individual honors and awards ==
This is a list of individual honors at the national and conference levels, including All-Americans.

=== National awards ===
USA Softball Collegiate Player of the Year

- Keilani Ricketts (2012, 2013)
- Jocelyn Alo (2021, 2022)

NFCA National Player of the Year

- Jocelyn Alo (2022)

Softball America Player of the Year

- Jocelyn Alo (2021)

Softball America Pitcher of the Year

- Giselle Juarez (2019)

Softball America Defensive Player of the Year

- Grace Lyons (2023)

NFCA National Freshman of the Year

- Paige Parker (2015)
- Jocelyn Alo (2018)
- Tiare Jennings (2021)
- Jordy Bahl (2022)
- Kendall Wells (2026)

Softball America Freshman of the Year

- Tiare Jennings (2021)
- Jordy Bahl (2022)
- Kendall Wells (2026)

NFCA Catcher of the Year

- Kendall Wells (2026)

Honda Sports Award

- Keilani Ricketts (2013)

Softball Academic All-American of the Year

- Lana Moran (2000)

=== Conference awards ===
Big 12 Player of the Year

- Jill Most (1996)
- Lynette Velazquez (1999)
- Lisa Carey (2000)
- Kelli Braitsch (2001)
- Norelle Dickson (2007)
- Amber Flores (2009, 2010)
- Keilani Ricketts (2012)
- Shelby Pendley (2013, 2015)
- Erin Miller (2016)
- Shay Knighten (2017)
- Sydney Romero (2019)
- Jocelyn Alo (2021, 2022)
- Jayda Coleman (2023)

Big 12 Pitcher of the Year

- Lauren Eckermann (2007)
- Keilani Ricketts (2013)
- Paige Parker (2015, 2016, 2017, 2018)
- Giselle Juarez (2019)
- Jordy Bahl (2022, 2023)

Big 12 Freshman of the Year

- Lisa Carey (1998)
- Jennifer Stewart (1999)
- Lauren Chamberlain (2012)
- Paige Parker (2015)
- Shay Knighten (2016)
- Nicole Mendes (2017)
- Jocelyn Alo (2018)
- Grace Green (2019)
- Tiare Jennings (2021)
- Jordy Bahl (2022)

Big 12 Defensive Player of the Year

- Heather Scaglione (2004, 2005)
- Savannah Long (2008)
- Lindsey Vandever (2010)
- Kelsey Arnold (2016, 2018)
- Caleigh Clifton (2019)
- Grace Lyons (2021, 2022, 2023)
- Kinzie Hansen (2024)

Big 12 Newcomer of the Year

- Andrea Davis (2000)

Big 12 Coach of the Year

- Patty Gasso (1996, 1999, 2000, 2009, 2012, 2013, 2014, 2015, 2016, 2017, 2018, 2019, 2021, 2022, 2023)

SEC Coach of the Year

- Patty Gasso (2025)

SEC Pitcher of the Year

- Sam Landry (2025)

SEC Freshman of the Year

- Kendall Wells (2026)

=== First Team All-American ===
Season	Player(s)
1999	Lynette Velazquez
2000	Lisa Carey
2001	Kelli Braitsch
2003	Leah Gulla
2004	Heather Scaglione
2005	Heather Scaglione
2006	Kristin Vesley
2007	Norrelle Dickson
2009	Amber Flores
2010	Heather Scaglione
2011	Keilani Ricketts
2012	Lauren Chamberlain, Keilani Ricketts, Jessica Shults
2013	Lauren Chamberlain, Keilani Ricketts
2014	Shelby Pendley
2015	Lauren Chamberlain
2016	Paige Parker
2018	Jocelyn Alo, Paige Parker, Sydney Romero
2019	Caleigh Clifton, Giselle Juarez, Sydney Romero
2021	Jocelyn Alo, Jayda Coleman, Tiare Jennings
2022	Jocelyn Alo, Jordy Bahl, Jayda Coleman, Tiare Jennings, Grace Lyons
2023	Jordy Bahl, Alyssa Brito, Jayda Coleman, Kinzie Hansen, Tiare Jennings
2024	Alyssa Brito, Tiare Jennings
2025	Ella Parker, Kasidi Pickering
2026	Ella Parker, Kendall Wells
