= 2021 America East Conference softball tournament =

American college softball tournament

- Teams: 4
- Format: Double-elimination tournament
- Finals site: The Diamond at UMBC; Baltimore, Maryland
- Champions: UMBC (2nd title)
- Winning coach: Chris Kuhlmeyer (2nd title)

The 2021 America East Conference softball tournament was held at the Diamond at UMBC on the campus of the University of Maryland, Baltimore County in Baltimore, Maryland from May 13 through May 15, 2021. The tournament was won by the UMBC Retrievers, who earned the America East Conference's automatic bid to the 2021 NCAA Division I softball tournament

== Tournament ==
=== Bracket ===
Thursday, May 13
1	UMBC	3
4	UMass Lowell	0
Winner's bracket
2	Albany	5
3	Stony Brook	10
2	Albany	4
4	UMass Lowell	3
Loser's bracket

Friday, May 14
1	UMBC	4
3	Stony Brook	1
3	Stony Brook	6
2	Albany	1

Saturday, May 15
1	UMBC	1	–
3	Stony Brook	0	–
