= Tiare Jennings =

American softball player (born 2002)

Texas Volts
- Infielder
- Born: June 5, 2002 (age 24); Torrance, California, U.S.
- Bats: Right Throws: Right

Teams
- Oklahoma (2021–2024); Oklahoma City Spark (2024–2025); Texas Volts (2025–present)

Career highlights and awards
- 4× Women's College World Series champion (2021–2024); 4× WCWS All-Tournament Team (2021–2024); 4× First Team All-American (2021–2024); NFCA National Freshman of the Year (2021); Softball America Freshman of the Year (2021); Big 12 Freshman of the Year (2021); 4× First team All-Big 12 (2021–2024)
Medals
Women's softball
Representing the United States
World Cup
Silver medal – second place	2024 Castions di Strada	Team
World Games
Gold medal – first place	2025 Chengdu	Team

Tiare Rose Jennings (born June 5, 2002) is an American professional softball player for the Texas Volts of the Athletes Unlimited Softball League. (AUSL). She played for the Oklahoma City Spark of the Association of Fastpitch Professionals (APF) and college softball for the Oklahoma Sooners. As a freshman in 2021, she was named NFCA National Freshman of the Year and Softball America Freshman of the Year. While at Oklahoma she won the Women's College World Series championship four consecutive years.

== Early life ==
Tiare Rose Jennings was born to Maria and Ignacio Jennings in Torrance, California, and grew up in San Pedro. She is of Samoan, Tokelauan, Filipino and Mexican descent. Jennings played travel ball for the OC Batbusters, and won the 2019 USA Elite Select World Fastpitch Championship.

== High school career ==
Jennings attended St. Anthony High School in Long Beach, California. During her freshman year, she was named the 2017 Southern Section Division 6 Player of the Year. She battled injuries during her junior year. During her senior year, she batted .710 with six home runs and 19 run batted in (RBIs), 18 runs scored, and a 1.483 slugging percentage in a season that was shortened due to the COVID-19 pandemic. She was named the 2019–20 Gatorade California Softball Player of the Year. She finished her high school career batting .581, with 111 hits, 61 RBIs and 16 home runs. She was ranked as the nations No. 2 recruit in the Class of 2020 by Extra Inning Softball's Elite 100 list and No. 4 on FloSoftball's Hot 100.

== College career ==
Jennings made her collegiate debut for Oklahoma on February 11, 2021, in a game against UTEP. Jennings began her career going 4-for-4 with three home runs and six RBI in a 29–0 victory. Jennings and Grace Lyons each homered three times against the Miners, tying a school record for most home runs by an individual player in a game. The Sooners set an NCAA single-game record for home runs in a game with 13. During the weekend at the Miner Invitational, she was 12-for-13, with five home runs, 12 RBIs, 30 total bases, eight extra-base hits, and a .983 batting average. She was subsequently named Big 12 Player of the Week for the week ending February 16, 2021.

During the Courtyard Marriott Tournament, Jennings went 11-for-17, with a .647 batting average, four home runs, 10 RBIs and 23 total bases. Additionally, she did not register a strikeout all weekend and was perfect in the field, making appearances at second base, shortstop and third base, collecting seven assists and a pair of putouts. She was named Big 12 Player of the Week for the week ending March 9, earning her second weekly honor. Jennings earned her third player of the week honor for the week ending April 7. She went 6-for-9, with six RBIs, 11 total bases, and her 16th home run of the season, in a series against Kansas. Jennings earned her fourth player of the week honor for the week ending April 20. Jennings went 4-for-7, with three home runs, 13 total bases and five runs scored during a series against Texas.

During the regular season, she ranked first in the Big 12 Conference in runs scored (60) and RBIs (72), and tied for first in doubles (14), and ranked second in hits (66), home runs and slugging percentage. She finished the 2021 season with 27 home runs and led the nation with 92 RBI. She also ranked in the top five nationally in slugging percentage, home runs, doubles, hits and batting average. Jennings's 92 RBI broke the NCAA Division I freshman single-season RBI record. Following an outstanding season, she was named first-team All Big 12, Big 12 all-freshman team, Big 12 Freshman of the Year, NFCA National Freshman of the Year and Softball America Freshman of the Year. She was also one of only two freshmen in the country named a top 10 finalist for the USA Softball Collegiate Player of the Year.

During her sophomore year in 2022, she batted .385 with 24 home runs, 72 RBIs, and a .882 slugging percentage. Her 24 home runs ranked for fourth in the nation, while her 72 RBIs tied for third in the NCAA. In the field, she had a .982 fielding percentage, with 14 double plays, 46 putouts and 63 assists to two errors. During the 2022 NCAA Division I softball tournament, she hit .524 in the Women's College World Series, with a World Series record 15 RBIs and five home runs. Following the season she was named a unanimous first-team All-American.

During her junior year in 2023, she led the team in batting average (.415), hits (76), RBIs (66) and total bases (143), and tied for the team lead with 17 home runs and ranked second with 16 doubles. Defensively she recorded 56 putouts and 71 assists and only one error for a career single-season best .992 fielding percentage. Following the season she was named a first-team All-American and a top 10 finalist for the USA Softball Collegiate Player of the Year.

== Statistics ==
Season	GP	GS	R	H	BA	RBI	HR	3B	2B	SLG	BB	SO	SB	SBA
Oklahoma Sooners
2021	60	60	81	91	.462	92	27	0	25	1.000	26	17	2	2
2022	62	62	83	73	.401	87	29	1	9	.940	39	13	8	9
2023	62	61	57	76	.415	66	17	0	16	.781	27	13	2	2
2024	66	66	56	74	.370	69	25	0	15	.820	36	17	3	3
Totals	250	249	277	314	.412	314	98	0	65	.885	128	60	15	16

== Professional career ==
Jennings was selected third overall in the 2024 Athletes Unlimited Pro Softball draft. However, she began her professional career with the Oklahoma City Spark, an independent team at the time of her signing.

On January 29, 2025, Jennings was drafted in the fifth round, 20th overall, by the Volts in the inaugural Athletes Unlimited Softball League draft.

== International career ==
Jennings represented the United States at the 2024 Women's Softball World Cup and won a silver medal. She represented the United States at the 2025 World Games and won a gold medal. On August 3, 2026, she won a gold medal representing the United States at the USA Softball International Cup.

== Personal life ==
Jennings has two younger siblings, Fa'atele (Tele) and Elai. Her sister Tele played college softball at Arizona and San Diego.
