= 2022 America East Conference softball tournament =

American college softball tournament

- Teams: 6
- Format: Double-elimination tournament
- Finals site: University Field; Stony Brook, New York
- Champions: UMBC (3rd title)
- Runner-up: Albany
- Winning coach: Chris Kuhlmeyer (3rd title)
- MVP: Courtney Coppersmith (UMBC)

2022 America East Conference softball standings
| | Conf. | | | | Overall |
| Team | W | | L | PCT | W | | L | PCT |
|---|---|---|---|---|---|---|---|---|
| UMBC ‍†‍‡‍^{y} | 12 | – | 6 | .667 | 31 | – | 12 | .721 |
| Stony Brook ‍‍‍ | 10 | – | 6 | .625 | 31 | – | 16 | .660 |
| Albany ‍‍‍ | 10 | – | 6 | .625 | 25 | – | 17 | .595 |
| UMass Lowell ‍‍‍ | 10 | – | 7 | .588 | 28 | – | 20 | .583 |
| Binghamton ‍‍‍ | 7 | – | 8 | .467 | 22 | – | 23 | .489 |
| Hartford ‍‍‍ | 5 | – | 13 | .278 | 17 | – | 29 | .370 |
| Maine ‍‍‍ | 4 | – | 12 | .250 | 8 | – | 37 | .178 |
† – Conference champion ‡ – Tournament champion y – Invited to the NCAA tournament As of June 5, 2022; Rankings from NFCA/USA Today

The 2022 America East Conference softball tournament was held at University Field on the campus of Stony Brook University in Stony Brook, New York from May 25 through May 28, 2022. The tournament will earn the America East Conference's automatic bid to the 2022 NCAA Division I softball tournament.

== Tournament ==
Upper round 1 | Upper round 2 | Upper final | Final
1 | UMBC | 1
4 | Binghamton | 5 | 4 | Binghamton | 0
5 | Hartford | 3 | 1 | UMBC | 1
2 | Albany | 0
2 | Albany | 6
3 | UMass Lowell | 6 | 3 | UMass Lowell | 5
6 | Maine | 1
1 | UMBC | 4
2 | Albany | 0
Lower round 1 | Lower round 2 | Lower round 3 | Lower final
2 | Albany | 5
3 | UMass Lowell | 3 | 3 | UMass Lowell | 3
4 | Binghamton | 9 | 4 | Binghamton | 0
5 | Hartford | 5 | 5 | Hartford | 7
6 | Maine | 4
