= Softball America Freshman of the Year =

American college softball award

- Awarded for: Best freshman player in college softball
- Country: United States
- Presented by: Wilson Sporting Goods

History
- First award: 2019
- Most recent: Kendall Wells, Oklahoma

The Softball America Freshman of the Year is an award given by Wilson Sporting Goods to the best college softball freshman player of the year. The award has been given annually since 2019. From 2019 to 2020 the award was split into two honors, the player and the pitchers of the year.

== Winners ==
=== Freshman of the Year ===
Year	Player	Position	School	Ref
2019	Danielle Williams	P	Northwestern	
2020	Maya Brady	U	UCLA	
2021	Tiare Jennings	IF	Oklahoma	
2022	Jordy Bahl	P	Oklahoma	
2023	NiJaree Canady	P	Stanford	
2024	Jaysoni Beachum	IF	Florida State	
2025	Taylor Shumaker	OF	Florida	
2026	Kendall Wells	C	Oklahoma	

=== Freshman Pitcher of the Year ===
Year	Player	School	Ref
2019	Shealyn O'Leary	Texas	
2020	Rylee Trlicek	Florida	
