= NFCA National Freshman of the Year =

Sports award

- Awarded for: Best freshman player in college softball
- Country: United States
- Presented by: Schutt Sports

History
- First award: 2014
- Most recent: Kendall Wells, Oklahoma

The NFCA National Freshman of the Year is an award given by Schutt Sports to the best college softball freshman of the year. The award has been given annually since 2014. The award is voted on by the members of the NFCA's NCAA Division I All-American Committee.

== Key ==
†	Co-Players of the Year

== Winners ==
Year	Player	Position	School	Ref
2014	Annie Aldrete^{†}	C	Tennessee	
2014	Kasey Cooper^{†}	3B	Auburn	
2015	Paige Parker	P	Oklahoma	
2016	Amanda Lorenz	OF	Florida	
2017	Rachel Garcia	P	UCLA	
2018	Jocelyn Alo	OF	Oklahoma	
2019	Danielle Williams	P	Northwestern	
2020	Not awarded due to the COVID-19 pandemic			
2021	Tiare Jennings	IF	Oklahoma	
2022	Jordy Bahl	P	Oklahoma	
2023	NiJaree Canady	P	Stanford	
2024	Jaysoni Beachum	IF	Florida State	
2025	Taylor Shumaker	OF	Florida	
2026	Kendall Wells	C	Oklahoma	
