= 2026 AUSL season =

Softball season

- League: Athletes Unlimited Softball League
- Sport: Softball
- Duration: June 9 – July 20, 2026
- Games: 25 (each team) (75 season total)
- Teams: 6
- TV partner(s): ESPN; CBS Sports Network; MLB Network; MLB.com

Draft
- Top draft pick: Allocation draft: Kelly Maxwell; College draft: Karlyn Pickens
- Picked by: Allocation draft: Portland Cascade; College draft: Carolina Blaze

Regular season
- Season champions: Utah Talons

AUSL Championship
- Champions: Utah Talons
- Runners-up: Chicago Bandits
- Finals MVP: Jadelyn Allchin

Seasons
- ← 2025 2027 →

The 2026 AUSL season was the second season for the Athletes Unlimited Softball League. There were six teams in the league: the Chicago Bandits, Carolina Blaze, Utah Talons, and Texas Volts, joined by the expansion teams Portland Cascade and Oklahoma City Spark.

== Drafts ==
On December 1, 2025, the AUSL held their expansion and had a subsequent allocation draft following the addition of the two new expansion teams. The drafts were aired on ESPNU.

The annual College Draft was held on May 4, 2026.

=== Expansion draft ===
==== Protected players ====
Bandits	Blaze	Talons	Volts
Erin Coffel	Ana Gold	Georgina Corrick	Rachel Garcia
Lexi Kilfoyl	Baylee Klingler	Megan Faraimo	Amanda Lorenz
Taylor McQuillin	Aubrey Leach	Hannah Flippen	Mia Scott
Morgan Zerkle	Kayla Kowalik	Sharlize Palacios	Tiare Jennings
Skylar Wallace	Keilani Ricketts	Montana Fouts	Dejah Mulipola
Mary Iakopo	Aleshia Ocasio	Caroline Jacobsen	Sierra Romero
Bella Dayton	Devyn Netz	Sahvanna Jaquish	Ciara Briggs

==== First round ====
Pick	Name	New team	Position	Previous team
1	Maya Brady	Oklahoma City Spark	Utility	Talons
2	Sam Landry	Cascade	Pitcher	Volts

==== Second round ====
Pick	Name	New team	Position	Previous team
3	Carley Hoover	Cascade	Pitcher	Blaze
4	Sydney McKinney	Spark	Utility	Bandits

==== Third round ====
Pick	Name	New team	Position	Previous team
5	Sydney Romero	Spark	Infielder	Blaze
6	Sierra Sacco	Cascade	Outfielder	Talons

==== Fourth round ====
Pick	Name	New team	Position	Previous team
7	Payton Gottshall	Cascade	Pitcher	Volts
8	Jessie Warren	Spark	Infielder	Volts

==== Fifth round ====
Pick	Name	New team	Position	Previous team
9	Alana Vawter	Spark	Pitcher	Blaze
10	Korbe Otis	Cascade	Outfielder	Blaze

==== Sixth round ====
Pick	Name	New team	Position	Previous team
11	Tori Vidales	Cascade	Infielder	Talons
12	Bubba Nickles-Camarena	Spark	Outfielder	Bandits

==== Seventh round ====
Pick	Name	New team	Position	Previous team
13	Delanie Wisz	Spark	Catcher/Utility	Bandits
14	Pass	Cascade		

==== Eighth round ====
Pick	Name	New team	Position	Previous team
15	Pass	Spark		

=== Allocation draft ===
==== First round ====
Pick	Name	Team	Position	College
1	Kelly Maxwell	Portland Cascade	Pitcher	Oklahoma
2	Kinzie Hansen	Oklahoma City Spark	Catcher	Oklahoma
3	Jayda Coleman	Utah Talons	Outfielder	Oklahoma
4	Kathryn Sandercock	Chicago Bandits	Pitcher	Florida State
5	Alyssa Brito	Carolina Blaze	Infielder	Oklahoma
6	Ally Carda	Texas Volts	Pitcher	UCLA

==== Second round ====
Pick	Name	Team	Position	College
7	Maddie Penta	Spark	Pitcher	Auburn
8	Mia Davidson	Cascade	Catcher	Mississippi State
9	Jadelyn Allchin	Talons	Outfielder	UCLA
10	Jocelyn Alo	Bandits	Utility	Oklahoma
11	Jenna Laird	Blaze	Infielder	Missouri
12	Alyssa Denham	Volts	Pitcher	Arizona

==== Third round ====
Pick	Name	Team	Position	College
13	Sis Bates (Note: Played with and was initially drafted by the Volts for the 2025 season.)	Cascade	Infielder	Washington
14	Jailyn Ford	Spark	Pitcher	James Madison
15	Rachel Becker	Talons	Infielder	Oklahoma State
16	Jessica Clements	Bandits	Outfielder	UCLA
17	Jala Wright	Blaze	Pitcher	Duke
18	Rylie Boone	Volts	Outfielder	Oklahoma

==== Fourth round ====
Pick	Name	Team	Position	College
19	Billie Andrews	Spark	Infielder	Nebraska
20	Paige Sinicki	Cascade	Infielder	Oregon
21	Maddie Moore	Talons	Infielder	Clemson
22	Sami Williams	Bandits	Infielder	Iowa State
23	Valerie Cagle	Blaze	Pitcher/Utility	Clemson
24 (Note: With this pick, the Volts reached the maximum number of players allowed on their roster ahead of the 2026 College Draft.)	Aliyah Binford	Volts	Pitcher/Utility	Mississippi

==== Fifth round ====
Pick	Name	Team	Position	College
25	Ali Newland	Cascade	Catcher/Utility	Louisiana State
26	Sydney Sherrill	Spark	Infielder	Florida State
27	Aliyah Andrews	Talons	Outfielder	Louisiana State
28	Emiley Kennedy	Bandits	Pitcher	Texas A&M
29	Pass	Blaze		

==== Sixth round ====
Pick	Name	Team	Position	College
30	Haley Lee	Spark	Catcher/Utility	Oklahoma
31	Kendra Falby	Cascade	Outfielder	Florida
32	Pass	Talons		
33	Pass	Bandits		

==== Seventh round ====
Pick	Name	Team	Position	College
34	Pass	Spark		
35	Pass	Cascade		

=== 2026 College Draft ===
The 2026 College Draft was held on May 4, 2026 and aired live on ESPN2. Karlyn Pickens was drafted first overall by the Carolina Blaze.

==== First round ====
Pick	Name	Team	Position	College
1	Karlyn Pickens	Carolina Blaze	Pitcher	Tennessee
2	NiJaree Canady	Texas Volts	Pitcher	Texas Tech
3	Maya Johnson	Oklahoma City Spark	Pitcher	Belmont
4	Megan Grant	Portland Cascade	Utility	UCLA
5	Jocelyn Erickson	Chicago Bandits	Catcher	Florida
6	Jordan Woolery	Utah Talons	Infielder	UCLA

==== Second round ====
Pick	Name	Team	Position	College
7	Reese Atwood	Blaze	Catcher	Texas
8	Leighann Goode	Volts	Infielder	Texas
9	Sydney Stewart	Cascade	Catcher	Arizona
10	Peja Goold	Spark	Pitcher	Mississippi State
11	Taryn Kern	Bandits	Infielder	Stanford
12	Taylor Tinsley	Talon	Pitcher	UCLA

==== Third round ====
Pick	Name	Team	Position	College
13	Ailana Agbayani	Bandits	Infielder	Oklahoma
14	Amari Harper	Spark	Utility	Oregon
15	Kenzie Brown	Cascade	Pitcher	Arizona State
16	Dakota Kennedy	Blaze	Outfielder	Arkansas

==== Fourth round ====
Pick	Name	Team	Position	College
17	Kenleigh Cahalan	Cascade	Infielder	Florida

== Teams ==
On November 12, 2025, the league announced the addition of two new expansion teams: the Cascade and the Oklahoma City Spark. The Spark previously played in Association of Fastpitch Professionals and is the first AUSL team to have a confirmed home location (Oklahoma City, Oklahoma). The locations of the remaining five teams, as well as the ballparks for all six, were unveiled on January 13, 2026. At this time, it was also confirmed that the Bandits are the continuation of the National Pro Fastpitch team of the same name.

=== Chicago Bandits ===
Chicago Bandits roster
Pitchers: 3 Odicci Alexander-Bennett; 16 Bri Copeland; 13 Amber Fiser; 11 Emiley Kennedy ^{#}; 8 Lexi Kilfoyl ^{#}; 9 Mariah Lopez; 22 Taylor McQuillin; 32 Kat Sandercock ^{#}; Catchers: 12 Jocelyn Erickson; 33 Mary Iakopo; Outfielders: 5 Jessica Clements; 6 Bella Dayton ^{#}; 18 Morgan Zerkle	Infielders: 50 Ailana Agbayani; 20 Tianna Bell; 21 Erin Coffel; 99 Taryn Kern; 23 Kyleigh Sand; 17 Skylar Wallace ^{#}; 7 Sami Williams; Utility: 78 Jocelyn Alo ^{#}; 00 Elon Butler
Reference: Updated: June 17, 2026

Bandits coaching staff
- Jenny Dalton-Hill (General manager)
- Shonda Stanton (Head coach)

=== Carolina Blaze ===
Carolina Blaze roster
Pitchers: 27 Emma Lemley; 8 Aleshia Ocasio; 23 Karlyn Pickens; 10 Keilani Ricketts; 14 Jala Wright; Catchers: 15 Reese Atwood; Outfielders: 86 McKenzie Clark; 22 Dakota Kennedy; 17 Jenna Laird	Infielders: 4 Ana Gold; 3 Baylee Klingler ^{#}; 75 Aubrey Leach; Utility: 33 Alyssa Brito; 72 Valerie Cagle; 99 Kayla Kowalik; 34 Devyn Netz; 40 Karli Spaid
Reference: Updated: June 17, 2026

Blaze coaching staff
- Dana Sorensen (General manager)
- Kara Dill (Head coach)

=== Portland Cascade ===
Portland Cascade roster
Pitchers: 18 Kenzie Brown; 33 Payton Gottshall; 10 Carley Hoover ^{#}; 21 Sam Landry; 28 Kelly Maxwell; 34 Mariah Mazon; Catchers: 77 Mia Davidson ^{#}; 24 Sydney Stewart; 8 Kelly Torres; Outfielders: 27 Kendra Falby; 3 Korbe Otis; 12 Sierra Sacco	Infielders: 22 Sis Bates; 31 Kenleigh Cahalan; 1 Kennedy Powell; 38 Paige Sinicki ^{#}; 29 Tori Vidales; Utility: 43 Megan Grant; 44 Ali Newland
Reference: Updated: June 17, 2026

Cascade coaching staff
- Jami Lobpries (General manager)
- Tairia Flowers (Head coach)

=== Oklahoma City Spark ===
Oklahoma City Spark roster
Pitchers: 99 Cassidy Curd; 12 Jailyn Ford ^{#}; 3 Peja Goold; 33 Lyndsey Grein; 23 Maya Johnson; 66 Ruby Meylan; 19 Maddie Penta ^{#}; 15 Alana Vawter ^{#}; Catchers: 9 Kinzie Hansen ^{#}; 8 Grace Jenkins; Outfielders: 48 Bubba Nickles-Camarena	Infielders: 6 Billie Andrews; 25 Sydney McKinney ^{#}; 2 Sydney Romero; 24 Sydney Sherrill; 90 Jessi Warren; 97 Delanie Wisz; Utility: 7 Maya Brady; 31 Amari Harper; 45 Haley Lee; 42 KK Madrey
Reference: Updated: June 17, 2026

Spark coaching staff
- Kirk Walker (General manager)
- Amber Flores (Head coach)

=== Utah Talons ===
Utah Talons roster
Pitchers: 22 Georgina Corrick ^{#}; 12 Dallas Escobedo Magee; 80 Megan Faraimo; 14 Montana Fouts; 23 Taylor Tinsley; 66 Sarah Willis; Catchers: 13 Sharlize Palacios; Outfielders: 42 Jadelyn Allchin; 11 Aliyah Andrews; 24 Jayda Coleman; 51 Caroline Jacobsen	Infielders: 15 Rachel Becker; 7 Tayler Biehl; 77 Bri Ellis; 19 Hannah Flippen; 28 Maddie Moore; 17 Jordan Woolery; Utility: 27 Sahvanna Jaquish; 00 Kailey Wyckoff
Reference: Updated: June 17, 2026

Talons coaching staff
- Lisa Fernandez (General manager)
- Cindy Ball-Malone (Head coach)

=== Texas Volts ===
Texas Volts roster
Pitchers: 29 Sydney Berzon; 4 Aliyah Binford; 24 NiJaree Canady; 3 Ally Carda ^{#}; 40 Alyssa Denham; 00 Rachel Garcia; 44 Jessica Mullins; Catchers: 51 Michaela Edenfield; 2 Dejah Mulipola ^{#}; 36 Jordyn Rudd-Lee; Outfielders: 5 Rylie Boone; 12 Jaydyn Goodwin; 1 Jalia Lassiter; 18 Amanda Lorenz ^{#}	Infielders: 43 Leighann Goode; 23 Tiare Jennings; 32 Sierra Romero; 7 Kelsey Stewart-Hunter ^{#}; 17 Aminah Vega; Utility: 13 Danieca Coffey; 20 Jackie Lis
Reference: Updated: June 17, 2026

Volts coaching staff
- Cat Osterman (General manager)
- Ricci Woodard (Head coach)

== Schedule ==
The season schedule was officially announced on January 13, 2026, with each team scheduled to play 25 games. The regular season will begin on June 9 and then it will conclude on July 20, followed by a play-in game, followed by the best of three AUSL Championship series, and the 2026 All-Star Cup.

ESPN will broadcast 47 regular season games and the championship series.

2026 AUSL regular eason
June

Date	Time (CT)	Visitor	Result	Home	TV	Location
June 9	4:00 PM	Cascade	1–4	Blaze	CBSSN	Smith Family Stadium
June 9	6:00 PM	Volts	5–13 ^{(6)}	Spark	ESPN2	Tom Heath Field
June 9	8:00 PM	Bandits	2–5	Talons	ESPN2	Dumke Family Stadium
June 10	5:00 PM	Volts	5–8	Spark	MLB.TV	Tom Heath Field
June 10	7:00 PM	Cascade	2–11 ^{(5)}	Blaze	ESPN2	Smith Family Stadium
June 10	9:00 PM	Bandits	0–1	Talons	ESPNU	Dumke Family Stadium
June 11	4:00 PM	Cascade	12–4 ^{(5)}	Blaze	CBSSN	Smith Family Stadium
June 11	6:00 PM	Volts	4–5	Spark	MLB.TV	Tom Heath Field
June 11	8:00 PM	Bandits	8–9 ^{(8)}	Talons	ESPNU	Dumke Family Stadium
June 13	1:00 PM	Spark	9-1 ^{(5)}	Bandits	ESPN2	Parkway Bank Sports Complex
June 13	3:00 PM	Cascade	3-1	Talons	CBSSN	Dumke Family Stadium
June 14	11:00 PM	Volts	1-9 ^{(6)}	Blaze	ESPN2	Smith Family Stadium
June 14	1:00 PM	Spark	3-11 ^{(6)}	Bandits	ESPN2	Parkway Bank Sports Complex
June 14	7:00 PM	Cascade	2-1	Talons	MLB Network	Dumke Family Stadium
June 15	6:00 PM	Volts	5-6 ^{(9)}	Blaze	ESPN2	Smith Family Stadium
June 15	8:30 PM	Cascade	3-2	Talons	ESPN2	Dumke Family Stadium
June 16	6:00 PM	Spark	4-5	Bandits	ESPNU	Parkway Bank Sports Complex
June 17	5:00 PM	Blaze	3–4	Bandits	CBSSN	Parkway Bank Sports Complex
June 18	6:00 PM	Talons	4–3	Volts	ESPN	Dell Diamond
June 18	8:00 PM	Spark	0–3	Cascade	ESPN	Hillsboro Ballpark
June 19	6:00 PM	Talons	6–1	Volts	MLB.TV	Dell Diamond
June 19	8:00 PM	Spark	6–1	Cascade	ESPN2	Hillsboro Ballpark
June 20	11:00 AM	Blaze	8–0 ^{(5)}	Bandits	ESPN	Parkway Bank Sports Complex
June 20	7:00 PM	Talons	8–0	Volts	MLB.TV	Dell Diamond
June 21	11:30 AM	Spark	4–3	Cascade	ESPN	Hillsboro Ballpark
June 22	12 PM	Blaze	1–5	Bandits	(Note: Because of weather, this game was postponed from June 21. It was set to air on MLB Network, but that was scrapped for the rescheduled date.)	Parkway Bank Sports Complex
June 22	7:00 PM	Spark	1–5	Talons	ESPN2	Dumke Family Stadium
June 23	6:00 PM	Bandits	2–6	Volts	ESPNU	Dell Diamond
June 23	8:00 PM	Spark	3–6	Talons	CBSSN	Dumke Family Stadium
June 24	7:00 PM	Bandits	4–6	Volts	CBSSN	Dell Diamond
June 25	6:00 PM	Talons	3–2 ^{(6)}	Blaze	ESPN	Durham Bulls Athletic Park
June 26	5:00 PM	Talons	3–0	Blaze	CBSSN	Durham Bulls Athletic Park
June 26	7:00 PM	Cascade	5–1	Volts	ESPNU	Dell Diamond
June 27	1:00 PM	Talons	1–6	Blaze	ESPN	Durham Bulls Athletic Park
June 27	4:00 PM	Bandits	14–0 ^{(5)}	Spark	CBSSN	Tom Heath Field
June 27	7:00 PM	Cascade	6–3	Volts	MLB.TV	Dell Diamond
June 28	12:00 PM	Cascade	5–2	Volts	ESPN	Dell Diamond
June 28	7:00 PM	Bandits	8–6	Spark	MLB Network	Tom Heath Field
June 29	6:00 PM	Blaze	5–4	Spark	ESPN2	Tom Heath Field
June 30	6:00 PM	Cascade	3–13 ^{(5)}	Bandits	ESPNU	Parkway Bank Sports Complex
June 30	8:00 PM	Volts	2–5	Talons	CBSSN	Dumke Family Stadium

July

Date	Time (CT)	Visitor	Result	Home	TV	Location
July 1	6:00 PM	Blaze	3–9	Spark	ESPN2	Tom Heath Field
July 1	8:00 PM	Volts	4–8	Talons	MLB.TV	Dumke Family Stadium
July 2	6:00 PM	Cascade	3–11 ^{(5)}	Bandits	ESPN	Parkway Bank Sports Complex
July 3	8:00 PM	Blaze	4–2	Talons	MLB.TV	Dumke Family Stadium
July 4	3:30 PM	Volts	2–3 ^{(8)}	Bandits	CBSSN	Parkway Bank Sports Complex
July 4	6:00 PM	Cascade	3–12 ^{(5)}	Spark	ESPNU	Tom Heath Field
July 4	8:00 PM	Blaze	4–5	Talons	CBSSN	Dumke Family Stadium
July 5	12:00 PM	Cascade	8–4	Spark	ESPN2	Tom Heath Field
July 5	7:00 PM	Volts	1–2	Bandits	MLB Network	Parkway Bank Sports Complex
July 6	6:00 PM	Volts	5–7	Bandits	ESPNU	Parkway Bank Sports Complex
July 7	7:00 PM	Blaze	2–4	Cascade	ESPN2	Hillsboro Ballpark
July 8	7:00 PM	Blaze	1–2 ^{(8)}	Cascade	CBSSN	Hillsboro Ballpark
July 9	7:00 PM	Talons	3–4	Spark	ESPNU	Tom Heath Field
July 10	6:00 PM	Blaze	0–1 ^{(8)}	Volts	ESPNU	Dell Diamond
July 10	8:30 PM	Bandits	8–6	Cascade	CBSSN	Hillsboro Ballpark
July 11	1:00 PM	Blaze	3–4	Volts	ESPN	Dell Diamond
July 11	4:00 PM	Bandits	2–0	Cascade	CBSSN	Hillsboro Ballpark
July 11	7:00 PM	Talons	5–4	Spark	MLB.TV	Tom Heath Field
July 12	2:00 PM	Bandits	4–5	Cascade	ESPN2	Hillsboro Ballpark
July 12	7:00 PM	Talons	2–4	Spark	MLB Network	Tom Heath Field
July 13	6:00 PM	Blaze	0–8 ^{(8)}	Volts	ESPN2	Dell Diamond
July 14	6:00 PM	Spark	7–2	Volts	ESPN2	Dell Diamond
July 15	5:00 PM	Bandits	7–6 ^{(8)}	Blaze	MLB.TV	Smith Family Stadium
July 15	7:00 PM	Spark	7–2	Volts	ESPNU	Dell Diamond
July 15	9:00 PM	Talons	2–10 ^{(5)}	Cascade	CBSSN	Hillsboro Ballpark
July 16	6:00 PM	Bandits	15–7 ^{(6)}	Blaze	CBSSN	Smith Family Stadium
July 16	9:00 PM	Talons	4–3	Cascade	MLB.TV	Hillsboro Ballpark
July 17	7:00 PM	Volts	7–2	Cascade	ESPN2	Hillsboro Ballpark
July 18	3:00 PM	Talons	1–2 ^{(8)}	Bandits	ESPN2	Parkway Bank Sports Complex
July 18	5:00 PM	Spark	12–4 ^{(8)}	Blaze	ESPNU	Smith Family Stadium
July 18	9:00 PM	Volts	1–10 ^{(5)}	Cascade	CBSSN	Hillsboro Ballpark
July 19	11:00 PM	Spark	6–5	Blaze	ESPN	Smith Family Stadium
July 19	7:00 PM	Talons	3–1	Bandits	MLB Network	Parkway Bank Sports Complex
July 20	6:00 PM	Spark	1–11 ^{(5)}	Blaze	ESPN2	Smith Family Stadium

Postseason

Date	Time (CT)	Visitor	Result	Home	TV	Location
July 23 (Play-in)	8:00 PM	Cascade	5–6 ^{(11)}	Bandits	ESPN	Davis Diamond
July 25 (Championship Game 1)	12:00 PM	Bandits	1–2	Talons	ABC	Davis Diamond
July 26 (Championship Game 2)	1:00 PM	Talons	6–1	Bandits	ESPN	Davis Diamond

== Awards and honors ==
=== Awards ===
Award	Player
Hitter of the Year	Sami Williams (CHI)
Pitcher of the Year	Montana Fouts (UTA)
Rookie of the Year	Reese Atwood (CAR)
Comeback Player of the Year	Bri Ellis (UTA)
Impact Award	Odicci Alexander-Bennett (CHI)

=== All-AUSL Team ===
All-AUSL Team
Position	Player
Pitcher	Montana Fouts (UTA)
Catcher	Reese Atwood (CAR)
Corner Infielders	Sami Williams (CHI)
Corner Infielders	Bri Ellis (UTA)
Middle Infielders	Skylar Wallace (CHI)
Middle Infielders	Sydney Romero (OKC)
Outfielders	Maya Brady (OKC)
Outfielders	Jadelyn Allchin (UTA)
Outfielders	Korbe Otis (POR)
Utility	Megan Grant (POR)

== Media coverage ==
ESPN and MLB Network return as the main media partners for the 2026 AUSL season. CBS Sports Network joins as a new partner, airing 20 exclusive games. ESPN Networks will air up to 50 games, including the AUSL Championship, the All-Star Cup, and the AUSL Pro Game at the Little League Softball World Series. As part of those 50 games, Game One of the AUSL Championship will air on ABC, which will mark the very first time a professional softball game will be broadcast on network television. MLB Network will air a total of 11 games, primarily on Sunday nights.

The placement of teams in six regional markets, as opposed to the touring model used in 2025, enhanced the growth of both an in-person and on-media fanbase for the league. Commissioner Kim Ng, who was the Miami Marlin's General Manager from 2021-2023, focused on providing a fast-moving product primarily for TV viewership. This resulted in significant growth in ESPN viewership, merchandise sales, in-stadium ticket sales, and social media impressions. As an added aspect of the league's commercial viability, it added or extended sponsorship from eight major national entities. Although the addition of two new teams in 2026 was very successful, as Portland accounted for nearly half of the league's sellout crowds, Commissioner Ng and Athletes Unlimited CEO Jon Patricof indicated that the league would forgo adding any additional teams for the time being, with expectations that the sport's return to the Olympic stage in the Summer of 2028 will spur even greater interest. The league is considering expanding the regular season schedule to fulfill the current demand for the product.
