= 2024 Southeastern Conference softball season =

2024 SEC Softball Season
- League: NCAA Division I
- Sport: Softball
- Teams: 13

Regular Season

Tournament

Softball seasons
- ← 2023 2025 →

2024 Southeastern Conference softball standings
	Conf.						Overall
Team	W		L		T	PCT	W		L		T	PCT
No. 3 Tennessee ‍†‍‍	19	–	5	–	0	.792	44	–	12	–	0	.786
No. 7 Florida ‍‍‡‍^{y}	17	–	7	–	0	.708	53	–	14	–	0	.791
No. 9 Texas A&M ‍‍‍^{y}	15	–	9	–	0	.625	44	–	15	–	0	.746
No. 16 Arkansas ‍‍‍^{y}	14	–	10	–	0	.583	37	–	18	–	0	.673
No. 10 Missouri ‍‍‍^{y}	13	–	11	–	0	.542	48	–	18	–	0	.727
No. 11 LSU ‍‍‍^{y}	12	–	12	–	0	.500	44	–	17	–	0	.721
No. 14 Georgia ‍‍‍^{y}	12	–	12	–	0	.500	43	–	19	–	0	.694
No. 18 Mississippi State ‍‍‍^{y}	12	–	12	–	0	.500	34	–	20	–	0	.630
No. 19 Alabama ‍‍‍^{y}	10	–	14	–	0	.417	38	–	20	–	0	.655
Auburn ‍‍‍^{y}	9	–	15	–	0	.375	29	–	21	–	1	.578
South Carolina ‍‍‍^{y}	8	–	16	–	0	.333	36	–	24	–	0	.600
Kentucky ‍‍‍^{y}	8	–	16	–	0	.333	31	–	24	–	0	.564
Ole Miss ‍‍‍^{y}	7	–	17	–	0	.292	31	–	27	–	0	.534
† – Conference champion ‡ – Tournament champion y – Invited to the NCAA tournament As of June 2, 2024; Rankings from NFCA/USA Today

The 2024 SEC softball season began play Thursday, February 8, and conference play began Friday, March 8. The 2024 Southeastern Conference softball tournament took place May 7–11 at Jane B. Moore Field in Auburn, Alabama. Vanderbilt University is the only full member of the Southeastern Conference to not sponsor a softball program.

== SEC preseason poll ==
The head coaches SEC preseason poll was released on January 25, 2024. Each head coach voted on a scale of 12 points for first place down to 1 point for last place, 12th. Each coach only voted for 12 teams, since they can not vote for their own team. Tennessee was picked to finish 1st, with six 1st place votes. Georgia was 2nd with six 1st place votes. Florida, while only 7th in the poll, got the remaining single, 1st place vote.

Preseason poll
Predicted finish	Team
1	Tennessee
2	Georgia
3	LSU
4	Arkansas
5	Auburn
6	Alabama
7	Florida
8	Texas A&M
9	South Carolina
10	Kentucky
11	Missouri
12	Ole Miss
13	Mississippi State

== Record vs. conference opponents ==
Date m/dd is for last scheduled game of series. Blank are not scheduled. Blue are home games, otherwise away.

2024 SEC softball records Source: 2024 SEC softball game results, 2024 SEC softball schedule
Team	W–L	ALA	ARK	AUB	FLA	UGA	KEN	LSU	MSU	MIZZ	MISS	SCAR	TENN	TAMU	Team	SR	SW
ALA	10–14		1–2	1–2	1–2	1–2	1–2	.	.	.	3–0	.	1–2	1–2	ALA	1–7	1–0
ARK	14–10	2–1		2–1	.	2–1	.	2–1	1–2	2–1	1–2	2–1	.	.	ARK	6–2	0–0
AUB	9–15	2–1	1–2		.	.	1–2	2–1	.	1–2	1–2	.	1–2	0–3	AUB	2–6	0–1
FLA	17–7	2–1	.	.		2–1	3–0	2–1	2–1	1–2	.	2–1	.	3–0	FLA	7–1	2–0
UGA	12–12	2–1	1–2	.	1–2		1–2	.	1–2	2–1	3–0	.	1–2	.	UGA	3–5	1–0
KEN	8–16	2–1	.	2–1	0–3	2–1		0–3	.	.	.	1–2	0–3	1–2	KEN	3–5	0–3
LSU	12–12	.	1–2	1–2	1–2	.	3–0		.	1–2	1–2	.	1–2	3–0	LSU	2–6	2–0
MSU	12–12	.	2–1	.	1–2	2–1	.	.		1–2	2–1	2–1	1–2	1–2	MSU	4–4	0–0
MIZZ	13–11	.	1–2	2–1	2–1	1–2	.	2–1	2–1		.	3–0	0–3	.	MIZZ	5–3	1–1
MISS	7–17	0–3	2–1	2–1	.	0–3	.	2–1	1–2	.		0–3	.	0–3	MISS	3–5	0–4
SCAR	8–16	.	1–2	.	1–2	.	2–1	.	1–2	0–3	3–0		0–3	0–3	SCAR	2–6	1–3
TENN	19–5	2–1	.	2–1	.	2–1	3–0	2–1	2–1	3–0	.	3–0		.	TENN	8–0	3–0
TAMU	15–9	2–1	.	3–0	0–3	.	2–1	0–3	2–1	.	3–0	3–0	.		TAMU	6–2	3–2
Team	W–L	ALA	ARK	AUB	FLA	UGA	KEN	LSU	MSU	MIZZ	MISS	SCAR	TENN	TAMU	Team	SR	SW

Updated for entire regular season. Tie brkrs: MSU>UGA & MSU>LSU ARK common. UGA>LSU MIZZ common. SCAR>KEN head to head.

== National rankings ==
The SEC has had 12 of 13 softball teams ranked in the top 25 of all three polls, at some point, and finished with 8 or 9 in all polls. From the previous polls to the final polls, Florida went up 4 or 5 places in two of the three polls. Alabama rose 11 or 12 in all three polls. Tennessee dropped 6 or 7 in all three. Missouri went down 3 in two. Arkansas dropped 13 or 14 in two. Mississippi State fell 3 or 11 to not ranked in two. All others changes were less than 3 places. All games listed were in the NCAA Division I softball tournament culminating in the Women's College World Series (WCWS). Rankings and not ranked opponents are from the ESPN/USA poll at the time of the game. All 13 SEC teams played in that tournament.

- Florida went 3–0 in their regional and 2–1 in their super regional against all not ranked, then 3–2 in the WCWS winning over #4 Oklahoma State, #18 Alabama, and #2 Oklahoma, while losing to #1 Texas and #2 Oklahoma.
- Alabama went 3–0 in their regional against all not ranked and 2–1 over #3 Tennessee in Tennessee's super regional, then 1–2 in the WCWS beating #7 Duke, and losing to #5 Florida and #6 UCLA.
- Tennessee was 3–0 in their regional against all not ranked then lost their super regional 1–2 to #18 Alabama.
- Missouri went 4–1 beating #15 Washington, otherwise playing not ranked, then lost their super regional 1–2 to #7 Duke.
- Arkansas lost their regional 1–2 losing once to #19 Arizona, otherwise playing not ranked.
- Mississippi State was 1–2 in #8 Stanford's regional, losing to Stanford, others being not ranked.

=== NFCA/USA Today ===
The 14th poll was after the conference tournaments and before the NCAA tournament. The 15th poll, after the NCAA tournament, was the final poll. See 2024 NCAA Division I softball rankings#NFCA/USA Today also.

Week	0	1	2	3	4	5	6	7	8	9	10	11	12	13	14	15	
FLA	17	16	14	13	13	10	10	10	10	9	10	12	11	8	7	3	FLA
ALA	12	11	10	10	11	14	13	13	14	12	14	17	17	20	19	8	ALA
TENN	2	2	5	9	8	8	7	4	6	4	4	3	3	2	3	9	TENN
TAMU	–	–	18	17	17	13	12	11	13	11	11	10	8	9	9	10	TAMU
MIZZ	–	14	11	14	12	11	15	12	11	14	13	14	13	11	10	11	MIZZ
LSU	14	12	6	4	3	2	2	6	5	6	7	6	10	10	11	12	LSU
UGA	6	4	3	5	7	5	5	3	3	7	9	11	14	14	14	14	UGA
ARK	16	15	15	15	18	20	18	20	19	17	16	15	15	16	16	18	ARK
MSU	–	–	25	24	24	21	20	17	16	16	17	18	20	17	18	21	MSU
KEN	25	18	16	16	23	–	–	–	–	–	24	21	24	–	–	–	KEN
SCAR	23	20	17	22	22	23	23	22	22	23	–	–	–	–	–	–	SCAR
AUB	19	25	–	–	25	25	25	–	–	–	–	–	–	–	–	–	AUB
MISS	–	–	–	–	–	–	–	–	–	–	–	–	–	–	–	–	MISS

=== D1Softball ===
The 13th poll was after the end of the regular season, before the conference tournaments, then the 14th poll, after the NCAA tournament, was the final poll. See 2024 NCAA Division I softball rankings#D1Softball also.

Week	0	1	2	3	4	5	6	7	8	9	10	11	12	13	14	
FLA	20	23	20	18	14	11	10	10	10	7	9	13	12	8	3	FLA
ALA	11	12	12	12	12	15	15	17	18	17	18	19	22	20	8	ALA
TENN	3	3	5	9	9	9	8	5	7	6	5	3	3	2	9	TENN
LSU	17	9	6	3	3	2	5	8	6	8	8	8	13	12	10	LSU
TAMU	25	25	16	21	23	17	12	11	17	13	11	9	10	11	11	TAMU
MIZZ	–	11	11	15	13	12	16	13	11	16	10	14	15	10	13	MIZZ
UGA	6	5	3	4	8	7	7	4	9	9	14	10	14	13	15	UGA
ARK	18	18	15	16	22	19	17	19	14	11	13	12	8	9	22	ARK
MSU	–	–	21	22	17	18	18	16	16	15	17	17	19	15	–	MSU
SCAR	22	20	18	23	20	23	–	–	–	–	–	–	24	–	–	SCAR
KEN	–	14	13	14	25	–	–	–	–	–	24	23	–	–	–	KEN
AUB	19	–	–	–	–	–	–	–	–	–	–	–	–	–	–	AUB
MISS	–	–	–	–	–	–	–	–	–	–	–	–	–	–	–	MISS

=== ESPN/USA Softball Collegiate ===
The 14th poll was after the conference tournaments and before the NCAA tournament. The 15th poll, after the NCAA tournament, was the final poll. See 2024 NCAA Division I softball rankings#ESPN.com/USA Softball Collegiate Top 25 also.

Week	0	1	2	3	4	5	6	7	8	9	10	11	12	13	14	15	
FLA	18	19	16	15	13	10	10	9	10	9	10	12	9	7	5	3	FLA
ALA	14	11	10	11	10	15	15	14	15	13	15	17	16	20	18	6	ALA
TENN	2	2	5	8	9	9	7	4	4	4	4	3	3	3	3	9	TENN
TAMU	24	25	17	18	19	17	14	12	14	12	12	11	8	10	12	10	TAMU
LSU	15	12	7	5	3	2	3	7	7	6	7	7	13	9	10	11	LSU
MIZZ	–	15	13	13	12	11	16	13	11	15	13	14	15	12	9	12	MIZZ
UGA	6	4	3	3	6	5	5	3	3	8	9	9	12	14	13	13	UGA
ARK	12	13	14	16	20	20	17	20	19	14	14	13	11	13	11	17	ARK
MSU	–	–	20	23	23	21	20	17	16	17	17	18	19	17	20	22	MSU
KEN	–	18	15	14	21	23	23	–	–	–	23	22	24	25	–	–	KEN
SCAR	22	21	18	22	22	22	25	–	25	25	–	–	–	–	–	–	SCAR
AUB	20	24	24	25	25	–	–	–	–	–	–	–	–	–	–	–	AUB
MISS	–	–	–	–	–	–	–	–	–	–	–	–	–	–	–	–	MISS

== All-SEC teams ==
On May 10, SEC officials announced their softball awards for the 2024 season. Jocelyn Erickson of Florida was selected as Player of the Year, Karlyn Pickens of Tennessee was named Pitcher of the Year, and Keagan Rothrock of Florida was Freshman of the Year, and Karen Weekly of Tennessee was chosen as the Coach of the Year.

The All-SEC Teams consist of 21 student-athletes on the First Team, 21 student-athletes on the Second Team, and a nine-member All-Defensive Team:

=== All-SEC First Team ===
- Bri Ellis, Arkansas
- Reagan Johnson, Arkansas
- Morgan Leinstock, Arkansas
- Jocelyn Erickson, Florida
- Kendra Falby, Florida
- Korbe Otis, Florida
- Skylar Wallace, Florida
- Reagan Walsh, Florida
- Jayda Kearney, Georgia
- Sara Mosley, Georgia
- Erin Coffel, Kentucky
- Sydney Berzon, LSU
- Ciara Briggs, LSU
- Ali Newland, LSU
- Madisyn Kennedy, Mississippi State
- McKenna Gibson, Tennessee
- Payton Gottshall, Tennessee
- Taylor Pannell, Tennessee
- Karlyn Pickens, Tennessee
- Rylie West, Tennessee
- Emiley Kennedy, Texas A&M

=== All-SEC Second Team ===
- Kayla Beaver, Alabama
- Kenleigh Cahalan, Alabama
- Cylie Halvorson, Arkansas
- Maddie Penta, Auburn
- Ava Brown, Florida
- Keagan Rothrock, Florida
- Dallis Goodnight, Georgia
- Rylea Smith, Kentucky
- Kelley Lynch, LSU
- Aynslie Furbush, Ole Miss
- Sierra Sacco, Mississippi State
- Aspen Wesley, Mississippi State
- Abby Hay, Missouri
- Alex Honnold, Missouri
- Jenna Laird, Missouri
- Alana Vawter, South Carolina
- Kiki Milloy, Tennessee
- Sophia Nugent, Tennessee
- Zaida Puni, Tennessee
- Kramer Eschete, Texas A&M
- Koko Wooley, Texas A&M

=== SEC All-Defensive Team ===
- Pitcher: Laurin Krings, Missouri
- Catcher: Jocelyn Erickson, Florida
- First Base: Bri Ellis, Arkansas
- First Base: Raeleen Gutierrez, LSU
- Second Base: Rylen Wiggins, Texas A&M
- Shortstop: Erin Coffel, Kentucky
- Third Base: Hannah Gammill, Arkansas
- Left Field: Ali Newland, LSU
- Center Field: Kendra Falby, Florida
- Right Field: Kayley Lenger, Missouri
- Right Field: Allie Enright, Texas A&M
