= Sam Landry =

American softball player (born 2003)

Portland Cascade
- Pitcher
- Born: March 5, 2003 (age 23); Mont Belvieu, Texas, U.S.
- Bats: Right Throws: Right

Teams
- Louisiana (2022–2024); Oklahoma (2025); Texas Volts (2025); Portland Cascade (2026–present)

Career highlights and awards
- First Team All-American (2025); WCWS All-Tournament Team (2025); SEC Newcomer of the Year (2025); All-SEC First team (2025); SEC All-Defensive team (2025); All-Sun Belt First team (2024); 2× All-Sun Belt Second team (2022, 2023); AUSL All-Star Cup 3rd place finisher (2026)

Samantha Leigh Landry (born March 5, 2003) is an American professional softball pitcher for the Portland Cascade of the Athletes Unlimited Softball League (AUSL). She played college softball at Louisiana and Oklahoma. She was named the 2025 SEC Newcomer of the Year and selected first overall in the 2025 AUSL Draft.

== High school career ==
Landry attended Barbers Hill High School in Mont Belvieu, Texas. During her senior year in 2020, she posted a 17–1 record with a 0.40 earned run average (ERA) and 252 strikeouts in 121 innings. She helped lead Barbers Hill to the Texas Class 5A state title, their first championship in school history. During the semifinals against Hallsville, she pitched a one-hit complete game shutout with 12 strikeouts. She was selected to play in the 2021 Premier Girls Fastpitch (PGF) High School Senior All-American Game.

She was ranked as the nation's No. 4 recruit by Extra Innings Softball. On November 11, 2020, she signed her national letter of intent to play college softball at Louisiana.

== College career ==
Landry began her collegiate for Louisiana in 2022. During her freshman year she appeared in 29 games with 24 starts and posted a 20–3 record, with a 2.76 ERA and 145 strikeouts in 117 1/3 innings. She also recorded six complete games and three shutouts with one save. She led the team in wins and posted the best winning percentage during conference play. Following the season she was named an All-Sun Belt second team selection.

During her sophomore year in 2023, she appeared in 42 games with 29 starts and posted a 19–6 record, with a 2.74 ERA and 150 strikeouts in 147 2/3 innings. She also recorded eight complete games and four shutouts. She led the team in wins for the second consecutive year. On February 10, 2023, during the first game of the season against Lafayette College, she pitched her first career no-hitter with a career-high 13 strikeouts. She was subsequently named Sun Belt Conference Softball Pitcher of the Week. Following the season she was again named an All-Sun Belt second team selection.

During her junior year in 2024, she appeared in 46 games with 28 starts and posted a 24–10 record, with a 2.08 ERA and 165 strikeouts in 194 1/3 innings. She also recorded ten complete games and six shutouts. During conference play she led all pitchers with 13 wins, and posted an opposing batting average of .179. Following the season she was named an All-Sun Belt first team selection.

On July 13, 2024, Landry transferred to Oklahoma. During her senior year in 2025, she appeared in 37 games, with 27 starts, and posted a 25–6 record, with a 1.94 ERA and 186 strikeouts in 191 2/3 innings. She was part of the Oklahoma team that competed in the Women’s College World Series. On February 16, 2025, in a game against Baylor, she pitched her first career perfect game. She retired all 15 batters she faced, with eight strikeouts in a five inning run rule victory. During conference play she posted an 11–4 record, with 87 strikeouts, four shutouts and three saves. Following the season she was named to the All-SEC first team and SEC All-Defensive team. She was also named SEC Newcomer of the Year.

== Professional career ==
On May 3, 2025, Landry was drafted first overall by the Volts in the 2025 AUSL Draft. After being left unprotected by the Volts, on December 1, 2025, she was drafted second overall by the Cascade in the AUSL expansion draft.

On December 2, 2025, Landry was selected second overall by the Portland Cascade in the AUSL expansion draft. During the 2026 regular season, she recorded a 4–3 record with a 4.38 ERA, one save, and 26 strikeouts in 32 innings.

During the 2026 AUSL All-Star Cup, Landry helped her team finish third, recording a 4–1 record with a 1.21 ERA and 14 strikeouts in 17⅓ innings. She also earned MVP 1 honors on August 14, 2026.

== Personal life ==
Landry was born to John and Nichole Landry, and has one brother, Stephen, and four sisters, Chelsie, Alyssa, Charleigh and Lakynn Landry.
