= Kendra Falby =

American softball player

Biographical details
- Born: January 27, 2003 (age 23)

Playing career
- 2022–2025: Florida
- 2026-present: Portland Cascade
- Position: Outfielder

Coaching career (HC unless noted)
- 2026–present: Florida (Student asst.)

Accomplishments and honors

Awards
- First-team All-SEC (2024, 2025); Second-team All-SEC (2023); Rawlings Gold Glove Award (2024, 2025); Softball America Defensive Player of the Year (2025); First-Team All-American (2025)

Kendra Lynn Falby (born January 27, 2003) is a Canadian-American professional softball player for the Portland Cascade of the Athletes Unlimited Softball League (AUSL). She played college softball at Florida.

== High school career ==
Falby attended Sunlake High School in Land O' Lakes, Florida. She was a member of the 2019 Canada U-19 Softball team that competed at the 2019 WBSC U-19 Women's Softball World Cup. She went 13-for-28 in 10 starts, helping the team to earn the bronze medal. Falby was named the 2021 Sunshine Athletic Conference East Softball Player of the Year, slashing .678/.716/1.106. She also played for the Tennessee MOJO travel team. She signed with Florida Gators softball on November 11, 2020.

== College career ==
During the 2022 season, in her freshman year, Falby ranked third in the country in hits with 85. She also stole 36 bases, displaying her speed during an inside-the-park home run against Mississippi State. Falby went 2-for-4 with an RBI and 3 runs against Virginia Tech in an elimination game during Game 3 of the Blacksburg Super Regional to send the team to the 2022 Women's College World Series. She slashed .392/.444/.493 during the year.

During the 2023 season, as a sophomore, Falby tied the program single-game run record with four runs against Mercer. She also tied the program single-game triples record with two against Kentucky.

Falby hit an inside-the-park home run against Oklahoma during the 2024 Women's College World Series in a game that Florida won to stave off elimination. Following the season she earned Rawlings Gold Glove honors at center field and was named to the All-SEC First Team and SEC All-Defensive Team.

During her senior season, Falby tied the program record for runs with 259 and ranked second in hits with 337. She earned multiple First-Team All-American selections, was named a Top 10 Finalist for USA Softball Collegiate Player of the Year, and was named the Softball America Defensive Player of the Year. On May 3, she stole a home run off of Oklahoma's Cydney Sanders that ranked number one on the SportsCenter Daily Top Ten Plays. She then stole home the following day to secure the series upset. The Gators once again returned to the Women's College World Series, where they were eliminated by Tennessee.

== Professional career ==
Falby was selected in the sixth round, 31st overall, by the Portland Cascade in the AUSL allocation draft.

== International career ==
Falby won a bronze medal representing Canada at the 2019 WBSC U-19 Women's Softball World Cup.

== Coaching career ==
Falby announced ahead of the season that she would return to Florida as the first base coach for the 2026 season.

== Personal life ==
Falby was born to a Canadian father and American mother.
