= Korbe Otis =

American softball player

Biographical details
- Born: March 3, 2003 (age 23)

Playing career
- 2022–2023: Louisville
- 2024–2025: Florida
- 2025: Carolina Blaze
- 2026: Portland Cascade
- Position: Outfielder

Accomplishments and honors

Awards
- First-team All-SEC (2024); First-Team All-American (2024); AUSL All-Defensive Team (2025); All-AUSL (2026)

Korbe Otis (born March 3, 2003) is an American professional softball player for the Portland Cascade of the Athletes Unlimited Softball League (AUSL). She played college softball at Louisville and Florida.

== High school career ==
Otis attended Columbine High School in Columbine, Colorado. She also competed in track and field, holding the school record in the 100m and 200m dashes. Otis committed to play for the Louisville Cardinals when she was in the 8th grade.

== College career ==
Otis enrolled at Louisville in 2022, starting every single game for the team as an outfielder. Across 52 games, Otis hit five home runs on the way to slashing .289/.333/.476, earning freshman All-ACC honors In her sophomore season, Otis performed well enough to be named a second-team All-American by D1Softball and Softball America. She slashed .414/.502/.702 across 56 games.

For her junior season, Otis transferred to Florida Gators. She would hit nine home runs and led the SEC in batting average, hitting .434. She also led the NCAA in walks with 59. She was recognized as a First-Team All-American. In her senior season, Otis played in every single game for the Gators while slashing .318/.465/.472.

== Professional career ==
Otis was selected in the second round, 6th overall, in the 2025 AUSL allocation draft by the Carolina Blaze. In her rookie season with the Blaze, Otis played in 24 games and was selected to the All-Star Cup, where she finished in eighth place. During the regular season she slashed .346/.422/.500 while hitting two home runs.

Ahead of the 2026 season, Otis was selected in the fifth round, 10th overall, in the 2026 AUSL expansion draft by the Portland Cascade. With the Cascade, Otis slashed .295/.375/.538 while hitting five home runs. She also appeared in the Cascade's sole postseason game. She was named to the All-AUSL team.

== Personal life ==
Otis graduated from the University of Florida with a bachelor's degree in biology. After the 2026 AUSL season, Otis announced that she had been awarded an NCAA postgraduate scholarship and that she intended to return to the University of Florida to attend medical school.
