= Valerie Cagle =

American softball player

Carolina Blaze
- Pitcher / Utility
- Born: January 7, 2002 (age 24); Yorktown, Virginia, U.S.
- Bats: Left Throws: Right

Teams
- Clemson (2020–2024); Carolina Blaze (2026–present)

Career highlights and awards
- USA Softball Collegiate Player of the Year (2023); Softball America Player of the Year (2023); 3× First Team All-American (2022–2024); Second Team All-American (2021); 2× ACC Player of the Year (2021, 2023); ACC Freshman of the Year (2021)

Valerie Rose Cagle (born January 7, 2002) is an American professional softball pitcher and utility player for the Carolina Blaze of the Athletes Unlimited Softball League (AUSL). She played college softball at Clemson, and was named USA Softball Collegiate Player of the Year in 2023.

== College career ==
On December 4, 2018, Cagle signed with Clemson as part of their inaugural class for 2020. During her freshman year in 2020, Cagle started all 27 games, including a team-high 13 starts as pitcher, in a season that was cancelled due to the COVID-19 pandemic. She hit .376, with 10 home runs, five doubles and an ACC best 36 RBIs. She was the only freshman in the country with 10 home runs.

During her redshirt freshman year in 2021, she was one of two Clemson players to start all 52 games. She sit .404 in, with 43 runs, 12 doubles, one triple, 17 home runs, a slugging percentage of .821 and an on-base percentage of .492. She led the team in hits (63), RBIs (45), walks (27), home runs (17), doubles (12), batting average (.404) and slugging percentage (.821). She posted a 28–7 record, with a 1.16 ERA, and five saves. She led the ACC in ERA, tied for first in saves, ranked second in strikeouts (267), second in wins (28), second in games started (32), and third in appearances (40). Following an outstanding season, she was named ACC Freshman of the Year, ACC Player of the Year, a first-team All-ACC selection and All-ACC Freshman team. She was also named a second-team All-American, and a finalist for NFCA National Freshman of the Year and USA Softball Collegiate Player of the Year. She became the first player in ACC history to be named league Player and Freshman of the Year in the same season, and the first All-American in program history.

During her redshirt sophomore year in 2022, she posted a 16–9 record, with a 1.92 ERA, and three saves in 32 appearances. She led the ACC in wins (16), complete games (16) and shutouts (7) and led the team with 176 strikeouts. She batted .308, with 10 doubles, one triple, 13 home runs, 44 RBIs and 34 runs scored. Following the season she was named first-team All-ACC and first-team All-American.

During her redshirt junior year in 2023, she posted a 25–8 record, with a 1.56 ERA, in 38 appearances with 188 strikeouts and limited opponents to a .182 average. She led the Tigers with a .469 average, a .887 slugging percentage and .565 on-base percentage, and led the ACC in RBIs (57), batting average, hits, on-base percentage, slugging percentage and total bases. She set a program record with 83 hits including 19 home runs and 15 doubles, and drew a program record 36 walks. On March 8, 2023, she pitched the first perfect game in program history in a game against Mercer. She retired all 15 batters she faced with just 51 pitches, and recorded eight strikeouts and 40 total strikes, as the Tigers won 18–0 in five innings via a mercy rule. Following an outstanding season, she was named ACC Player of the Year, first-team All-ACC and first-team All-American. She was also named USA Softball Collegiate Player of the Year, Softball America Player of the Year, and a Gold Glove Award winner at pitcher.

== Professional career ==
On December 1, 2025, Cagle was drafted in the fourth round, 23rd overall, by the Blaze in the AUSL allocation draft.
