= Sis Bates =

American softball player

Portland Cascade – No. 22
- Second baseman
- Born: Nicole Lynn Bates; February 24, 1998 (age 28); Ceres, California, U.S.
- Bats: Left Throws: Right

Teams
- Washington (2017–2021); Texas Volts (2025); Portland Cascade (2026–present)

Career highlights and awards
- 3× Softball America Defensive Player of the Year (2019–2021); 3× Pac-12 Defensive Player of the Year (2018, 2019, 2021); 2× NFCA First-team All-American (2018, 2019); NFCA Second-team All-American (2021); 3× Pac-12 All-Defensive team (2018, 2019, 2021)
Medals
Women's softball
Representing the United States
World Cup
Silver medal – second place	2024 Castions di Strada	Team
Pan American Games
Gold medal – first place	2023 Santiago	Team

Nicole Lynn "Sis" Bates is an American professional softball player for the Portland Cascade of the Athletes Unlimited Softball League (AUSL) and a member of the United States women's national softball team. She played college softball at Washington. She is also as an ambassador and mentor within the sport of softball.

== Early life ==
Bates was born and raised in Ceres, California where she grew up playing baseball with her brother, Jimmy, which earned her the nickname of "Sis". Sis began playing wiffle ball when she was 5 years old, which sparked a passion for softball. Even in her youth, Sis enjoyed working on defensive skills. During her high school years, Bates traveled 12 hours every Sunday to practice with her club team, Firecrackers Rico, in Southern California. According to her coach Tony Rico, Sis is the face of the Firecrackers organization as she expresses beauty, humility, grace and empathy. She graduated from Ceres High School in 2016 and attended the University of Washington. Growing up, Sis also played basketball, volleyball, soccer, dance, and gymnastics but softball stuck with her the most.

== Personal life ==
Sis grew up in a family of 4 with her parents, John and Michelle Bates, and her older brother, Jimmy Bates, who received his master's degree in education after interning with the softball program at the University of Washington in 2022. He hopes to eventually become an athletic director. Sis also has a dog named Nala.

== Playing career ==
Before beginning her college career, Sis Bates did not even intrigue Heather Tarr, the head coach at the University of Washington. It was not until a youth softball camp on campus where Sis showed Heather Tarr the impressive range and skills she possessed in the shortstop position. After recruitment, Bates began her collegiate career for the Washington Huskies in 2017.

During her freshman year she led the team and conference in triples with six, one shy from tying the program's single-season record. She also started all 64 games as an infielder playing a mix of second base, short stop, and third base. During her freshman year she had 66 hits including ten doubles, 3 home runs, and 6 triples. In her freshman year alone, Sis was rewarded with NFCA All Region Third Team, Pac-12 All-Freshman Team, and NFCA Freshman of the year finalist.

During her sophomore year in 2018, Sis had a breakout year where she helped lead her team to a super regional. While playing Alabama in the Super Regional series in an elimination situation, Sis scored the tying runs in the seventh inning to extend the season. Concluding her sophomore year, Sis earned 1 Pac-12 player of the week, USA Softball collegiate Player of the year finalist, Pac-12 All- Academic Honorable mention, Pac-12 All defensive team, All Pac-12 First Team, Pac-12 Defensive Player of the year, NFCA All-region first team, and NFCA All-American First team.

During Sis’ Junior Year, she broke records becoming only the 5th shortstop in Husky history to win multiple All-American awards, and only the third player in Pac-12 History to win multiple defensive player of the year awards. She led her team to a Women's College World series appearance, and finished the year with awards including Pac-12 All-Academic honorable mention, All-regional team, USA Softball collegiate player of the year finalist, USA Softball collegiate player of the year preseason watch list, Pac-12 all defensive team, NFCA All region first team, All-Pac-12 First team, Seattle Female sports star of the year, Pac-12 Defensive player of the year, and NFCA All-American first team.

While Sis’ senior season was cut short due to COVID-19, she still managed to be awarded with the Pac-12 All Academic Honor Roll, Senior class award candidate, and USA Softball Player of the Year Preseason watch list.

Sis was rewarded with a 5th year along with all other athletes competing during the pandemic. During her Covid year and final year playing college softball, Sis became the all time husky hit leader, all time husky triples leader, became second in husky history for scored runs, and moved to 6th all time in doubles. She concluded her college career with awards consisting of Tom Hansen Medal Winner, Pac-12 Defensive player of the year, All- American Second Team, USA Collegiate Softball Player of the year top 10, All Pac-12 First Team, NFCA All-Region First Team, Pac-12 All-Defensive Team, Athletes Unlimited draftee, Senior Class award finalist, NFCA All- America scholar athlete, and Pac-12 Academic Honor Roll.

During her Husky career, she has a .385 career batting average and hit .571 in 2020. She made zero errors in 2020 and two in 166 chances in 2019. She was named the Greatest Softball Shortstop of All Time by ESPN in 2020. She finished her career as the all-time leader in hits in program history. She was named Softball America Defensive Player of the Year three consecutive years from 2019 to 2021. She accumulated just five total errors at shortstop since the start of the 2019 season, which covered 125 games. Bates finished her college career with a fielding percentage of .982, the second-highest mark of any middle infielder in Washington program history.

== Professional career ==
After her first professional season with Athletes Unlimited, Bates took a year off following leg injuries to help coach the University of Washington softball program. Even with injuries, she was named Athletes Unlimited defensive MVP during her rookie season and finished in the top nine in Athletes Unlimited standings. During Sis’ professional seasons, her goal is not to win but rather to continue to grow as a player.

On January 29, 2025, Bates was drafted in the seventh round, 26th overall, by the Volts in the inaugural Athletes Unlimited Softball League draft. On December 1, 2025, she was drafted in the third round, 13th overall, by the Cascade in the AUSL allocation draft.

== National Team career ==
In 2017, Sis Bates was not even invited to try out for the national team and then again in 2018 where she was not invited back after an open tryout. Despite the initial rejection, Sis was still invited to compete with the WBSC Junior Women's World team in 2017. In 2017, she earned a gold medal while hitting .444 with 12 runs scored and seven RBIs. On August 31, 2023, Bates was named to the United States women's national softball team for the 2023 Pan American Games. During her adult national team career thus far, Sis has recorded an impressive resume while representing the USA. In 2022, Sis hit .500 with 1 home run, nine RBI and 13 runs scored while playing in the Pan American Championship. In 2023, Sis hit .636 with 1 double, 1 triple, 4 RBI and 4 runs scored in the World Cup Stage Event.

Bates represented the United States at the 2024 Women's Softball World Cup and won a silver medal.

== Coaching career ==
Sis began her first year coaching following her rookie season of professional softball in 2022. Sis began coaching under the title of Director of Player Development. Head Coach Heather Tarr emphasized Sis’ importance within the program stating, “...this role allows someone like Sis, to be the glue between our staff and our players.” While coaching at The University of Washington, she preached the importance of one-on-one infield drills, to simply stay consistent with form and basic movements on the defensive end. Coaching at Washington in 2022 taught her to see the game from a different perspective considering she had to explain and often demonstrate actions that were so easy for her. While it was an adjustment, she found it satisfying to help younger athletes that were in the same situations as her just a few years prior. Sis strives to make the players she coaches feel as comfortable as possible considering her outgoing personality is a key component to her game. Sis believes that playing loose creates the best mental and physical environment on the softball field, so she stresses that within her coaching.
