= Alyssa Brito =

American softball player

Carolina Blaze
- Infielder
- Born: September 15, 2002 (age 23); Tustin, California, U.S.
- Bats: Right Throws: Right

Teams
- Oregon (2021); Oklahoma (2022–2024); Carolina Blaze (2026–present)

Career highlights and awards
- 3× Women's College World Series champion (2022–2024); 2× First Team All-American (2023, 2024); 2× First team All-Big 12 (2023, 2024); Second team All-Big 12 (2022); Second team All-Pac-12 (2021); Pac-12 All-Freshman team (2021); Pac-12 All-Defensive team (2021)

Alyssa Marie Brito (born September 15, 2002) is an American professional softball player for the Carolina Blaze of the Athletes Unlimited Softball League (AUSL). She played college softball at Oregon and Oklahoma. While at Oklahoma she won the Women's College World Series championship three consecutive years.

== High school career ==
Brito began her high school career at Foothill High School in Santa Ana, California during her freshman year. She then attended Pacifica High School in Garden Grove, California. During her sophomore year in 2018, she was named first-team All-Empire League. During her junior year in 2019, she hit .510 with 12 home runs and 45 RBIs. Following the season she was named defensive player of the year and first-team all-league honors in the Empire League after helping to lead Pacifica to a league title. During her senior year in 2020, she hit .519 with six home runs over nine games in a season that was shortened due to the COVID-19 pandemic. She as a three-time California all-state selection and Ranked No. 32 in the FloSoftball rankings and No. 17 in the Extra Inning Softball top 100.

== College career ==
Brito began her collegiate for Oregon during the 2021 season. She started 53 games at shortstop and hit .299 with 10 home runs five doubles, a triple, 31 RBIs, and 30 runs scored while drawing 15 walks. She committed just four errors in 136 chances, and went 81 straight chances without making an error to begin her collegiate career. She also had a perfect fielding percentage and 152 putouts at first base. She hit .667 (6 for 9) with two home runs, nine RBIs and six runs scored in three run-rule wins. She was subsequently named the Pac-12 Player and Freshman of the week, and D1Softball National Freshman of the week for the week ending March 16, 2021. Following the season she was named a second team all-Pac-12, Pac-12 all-freshman team and Pac-12 all-defensive team honoree.

On May 28, 2021, Brito entered the NCAA transfer portal. On July 2, 2021, she transferred to Oklahoma.

During her sophomore year in 2022, she appeared in 61 games with 50 starts, and hit .368 with 14 home runs, seven doubles and 46 RBIs. During game one of the 2022 Women's College World Series championship series against Texas she went 2-for-5 with a double and RBI. During game two she went 2-for-4 with a pair of doubles, two runs scored and one RBI, to help Oklahoma win the national championship. Following the season she was named to the all-Big 12 second team.

During her junior year in 2023, she appeared in all 62 games with 61 starts at third base, and hit .412 with 17 home runs, 17 doubles, 60 RBIs, 48 runs scored and 140 total bases. She led the team in doubles, tied for the team-lead in home runs and ranked second in batting average. She also led the team with an .824 slugging percentage and ranked third on the team with a .477 on-base percentage. Defensively she had a .960 fielding percentage with 45 putouts, 76 assists and only five errors. During the regional finals of the 2023 NCAA Division I softball tournament against California, she went 2-for-3 with two home runs and tied a career-high with five RBIs. During the 2023 Women's College World Series, she hit .417, with one RBI, two runs scored, and drawing three walks, to help Oklahoma win their third consecutive national championship. Following the season she was named an all-Big 12 first team honoree and a unanimous NFCA first team All-American.

During her senior year in 2024, she started all 65 games at third base, and hit .399 with 18 home runs, 16 doubles, four triples, 61 RBIs, 64 runs scored and an .803 slugging percentage. Defensively she had a .964 fielding percentage with 37 putouts, 95 assists and only five errors. She helped lead Oklahoma to fourth consecutive national championship. Following the season she was named an all-Big 12 first team honoree and an NFCA first team All-American for the second consecutive year. She was also named NCAA Division I Softball Academic All-America Team Member of the Year. She finished her career at Oklahoma with a .395 batting average, 49 home runs and 167 RBI in 188 games.

On March 20, 2024, Brito was named an ambassador for BSN Sports' SURGE program. SURGE stands for Strength, Unity, Resilience, Growth, and Equity, and aims to empower girls to stay in sports.

== Professional career ==
On December 1, 2025, Britto was drafted fifth overall by the Blaze in the AUSL allocation draft.

== International career ==
On August 3, 2026, Brito won a gold medal representing the United States at the USA Softball International Cup.
