= Utah Talons =

American softball team

- Sport: Softball
- Founded: 2025
- League: Athletes Unlimited Softball League
- Based in: Salt Lake City, Utah
- Stadium: Dumke Family Stadium
- Colors: Forest Green, Gold, and White
- Head coach: Cindy Ball-Malone
- General manager: Lisa Fernandez
- Championships: 2 (2025, 2026)
- Website: theausl.com/talons

The Utah Talons are a women's professional softball team based in Salt Lake City, Utah, that competes in Athletes Unlimited Softball League (AUSL). The Talons began play in the league's inaugural 2025 season. The team plays their home games at Dumke Family Stadium, the Utah Utes softball stadium.

== History ==
In June 2024, Athletes Unlimited announced the creation of the Athletes Unlimited Softball League, which would feature four teams competing in a traditional season format. In December 2024, the Talons were revealed as the name of one of the original four teams, with Lisa Fernandez serving as general manager and Howard Dobson serving as head coach.

The Talons won the inaugural AUSL championship in 2025, with a 2–0 series victory over the Chicago Bandits.

AUSL moved to a city-based format for the 2026 season. In January 2026, Salt Lake City was announced as the home of the Talons, now known as the Utah Talons. In March, UCF Softball head coach Cindy Ball-Malone was announced as the new head coach of the Talons, replacing Howard Dobson.

On July 11 2026, the Talons clinched the first 2026 playoff spot with a 5–4 comeback win over the Oklahoma City Spark.

== Roster ==
Utah Talons roster
Active roster	Coaching staff
Pitchers: 22 Georgina Corrick ‡; 12 Dallas Escobedo Magee; 80 Megan Faraimo; 14 Montana Fouts; 23 Taylor Tinsley; 3 Jala Wright; Utility players: 27 Sahvanna Jaquish; 46 Kailey Wyckoff; Catchers: 13 Sharlize Palacios; Infielders: 15 Rachel Becker; 77 Bri Ellis; 19 Hannah Flippen; 17 Jordan Woolery; Outfielders: 42 Jadelyn Allchin; 11 Aliyah Andrews; 24 Jayda Coleman; 51 Caroline Jacobsen	Manager: Lisa Fernandez; Coaches: Cindy Ball-Malone; Jo Koons; Will Oldham; Brandon Bantz; Roster updated on July 13, 2026: Disabled list; ‡ Inactive list; § Suspended list

== Season-by-season results ==
Season	Finish	Wins	Losses	Win pct.	Playoffs
2025	1st	18	6	.750	Champions, 2–0 (Bandits)
2026	1st	16	9	.640	Champions, 2–0 (Bandits)
