= Carolina Blaze =

American softball team

- Sport: Softball
- Founded: 2024
- League: Athletes Unlimited Softball League
- Based in: Durham, North Carolina
- Stadium: Smith Family Stadium
- Colors: Black, orange and pink
- Head coach: Kara Dill
- General manager: Dana Sorensen
- Website: theausl.com/blaze

The Carolina Blaze are a women's professional softball team based in Durham, North Carolina, that competes in Athletes Unlimited Softball League (AUSL). The Blaze play their home games at Smith Family Stadium.

== History ==
In June 2024, Athletes Unlimited announced the creation of the Athletes Unlimited Softball League, which featured four teams. In December 2024, the Blaze were revealed as the name of one of the original four teams, with Dana Sorensen serving as general manager and Alisa Goler serving as head coach.

The league used a touring model in its inaugural 2025 season, and the Blaze finished in fourth place with a 7–17 record. The AUSL switched to a city-based format for the 2026 season. On November 24, 2025, Kara Dill was named the new head coach of the Blaze. In January 2026, North Carolina was announced as the home of the Blaze.

== Roster ==
Carolina Blaze roster
Active roster	Coaching staff
Pitchers: 27 Emma Lemley; 66 Ruby Meylan; 8 Aleshia Ocasio; 23 Karlyn Pickens; 10 Keilani Ricketts; Utility players: 33 Alyssa Brito; 72 Valerie Cagle; 99 Kayla Kowalik; 34 Devyn Netz; Catchers: 15 Reese Atwood; 36 Jordyn Rudd‑Lee; Infielders: 4 Ana Gold; 3 Baylee Klingler; 75 Aubrey Leach; Outfielders: 86 McKenzie Clark; 22 Dakota Kennedy; 17 Jenna Laird	Manager: Dana Sorensen; Coaches: Kara Dill; Roster updated on July 18, 2026: Disabled list; ‡ Inactive list; § Suspended list

== Season-by-season results ==
Season	Finish	Wins	Losses	Win pct.	Playoffs
2025	4th	7	17	.292	Did not qualify
