= Softball America Player of the Year =

American college softball award

- Awarded for: Best player in college softball
- Country: United States
- Presented by: Wilson Sporting Goods

History
- First award: 2019
- Most recent: Jordan Woolery, UCLA

The Softball America Player of the Year is an award given by Wilson Sporting Goods to the best college softball player of the year. The award has been given annually since 2019.

== Winners ==
Year	Player	Position	School	Ref
2019	Rachel Garcia	P	UCLA	
2020	Miranda Elish	P	Texas	
2021	Jocelyn Alo	U	Oklahoma	
2022	Jocelyn Alo (2)	U	Oklahoma	
2023	Valerie Cagle	P	Clemson	
2024	Reese Atwood	C	Texas	
2025	Bri Ellis	IF	Arkansas	
2026	Jordan Woolery	IF	UCLA	
