= Softball America Defensive Player of the Year =

American college softball award

- Awarded for: Best defensive player in college softball
- Country: United States
- Presented by: Wilson Sporting Goods

History
- First award: 2019
- Most recent: Isa Torres, Florida State

The Softball America Player of the Year is an award given by Wilson Sporting Goods to the best defensive college softball player of the year. The award has been given annually since 2019.

== Winners ==
Year	Player	Position	School	Ref
2019	Sis Bates	SS	Washington	
2020	Sis Bates (2)	SS	Washington	
2021	Sis Bates (3)	SS	Washington	
2022	Jordyn Rudd	C	Northwestern	
2023	Grace Lyons	SS	Oklahoma	
2024	Jocelyn Erickson	C	Florida	
2025	Kendra Falby	OF	Florida	
2026	Isa Torres	SS	Florida State	
