= Megan Grant =

American softball player

Portland Cascade – No. 43
- Utility
- Born: January 25, 2004 (age 22); Daly City, California, U.S.
- Bats: Left Throws: Right

Teams
- UCLA (2023–2026); Portland Cascade (2026–present)

Career highlights and awards
- 2× First team All-American (2025, 2026); Second team All-American (2023); 2× First team All-Big Ten (2025, 2026); 2× First team All-Pac 12 (2023, 2024); Pac-12 All-Freshman team (2023)

Megan Rose-LeDee Grant (born January 25, 2004) is an American professional softball player for the Portland Cascade of the Athletes Unlimited Softball League (AUSL). She played college softball at UCLA, where she became the Bruins all-time home run leader (91) and NCAA Division I single-season home run leader (42).

== High school career ==
Grant attended Aragon High School where she was a three-sport athlete, playing softball, volleyball and basketball. During her freshman year in 2019 she posted a .500 batting average with 51 run batted in (RBIs), 33 runs scored, and 42 hits, including 11 doubles, and 13 home runs. Following the season she was named the San Francisco Chronicle's softball regional player of the year. During her senior year she recorded 22 RBIs and 23 hits, including four doubles and six home runs, for a .511 batting average and was named the 2022 Peninsula Athletic League (PAL) softball co-Player of the Year as a senior. She was also named the San Mateo Daily Journal Girls' Athlete of the Year. She finished her basketball career with 556 points, 421 rebounds, 88 assists, 81 steals and 29 blocks.

She was ranked as the No. 2 overall recruit in the country by Extra Inning Softball. On November 15, 2021, she committed to play college softball at UCLA.

== Softball career ==
=== College ===
During her freshman year in 2023, she started 58 games and ranked fourth on the team with a .333 batting average and .415 on-base percentage. She led UCLA with 14 doubles and ranked second with 15 home runs, 58 RBIs, 31 extra-base hits and a .695 slugging percentage. She played six different positions, including 31 starts at third base, 16 starts in right field, five at first base, three at shortstop, two as the designated player and one in left field. She ranked second among all NCAA freshmen in RBIs (58) and led all Pac-12 freshmen in RBI, home runs, slugging percentage and doubles. Following the season she was named to the Pac-12 All-Freshman team and first-team All-Pac 12.

During her sophomore year in 2024, she started all 55 games and ranked third on the team with a .335 batting average, 30 extra-base hits and 41 RBIs, along with eight home runs, 11 doubles, one triple and 27 runs scored. She started 42 games in right field, nine games at first base and four games in left field. She ranked second on the team with 16 multi-hit games and third with 11 multi-RBI games. Following the season she was named to the first-team All-Pac 12 for the second consecutive year.

During her junior year in 2025, she played 67 games, with 65 starts, and recorded a .376 batting average, along with 26 home runs, 12 doubles and one triple, 81 RBIs and 46 runs scored. She led the team in home runs, slugging percentage, on-base percentage and walks. She set the Big Ten single-season record for home runs with 26. She led the Big Ten in home runs (26), walks (49) and ranked second in RBIs (81). Following the season she was named to the first team All-Big Ten, an NFCA First Team All-American and USA Softball Collegiate Player of the Year top-ten finalist.

On April 24, 2026, she recorded her 32nd home run of the season, setting a new single-season program record, surpassing the previous record of 31 set by Stacey Nuveman in 1999. On May 9, 2026, during the 2026 Big Ten softball tournament championship game against Nebraska, she recorded her 38th home run of the season, setting a new NCAA Division I single-season record, surpassing the previous record of 37 set by Laura Espinoza in 1995. On May 29, 2026, during the first round of the 2026 Women's College World Series against Arkansas, she recorded her 91st career home run, setting a new UCLA career home run record, surpassing the previous record of 90 set by Stacey Nuveman in 2002.

=== Professional ===
On May 4, 2026, Grant was drafted fourth overall by the Portland Cascade in the 2026 AUSL College Draft. On June 4, 2026, she signed a rookie contract with the Cascade.

=== International ===
Grant won a gold medal representing the United States at the 2021 U-18 Women's Softball World Cup.

== Basketball career ==
On July 11, 2025, Grant joined the UCLA Bruins women's basketball for the 2025–26 season. She appeared in 13 games as a reserve player, and recorded six points, four rebounds and one assist, in 33 minutes. UCLA won their first NCAA championship of the NCAA era.

== Personal life ==
Grant is of Samoan descent. She was born to Christine and Shawn Grant, and has two brothers, Devin and Camron. Devin played college football at College of Idaho, while Camron played college baseball at Skyline College, University of Louisiana at Monroe, Oklahoma Baptist University and Cal State East Bay.
