= Tairia Flowers =

American softball coach (born 1981)

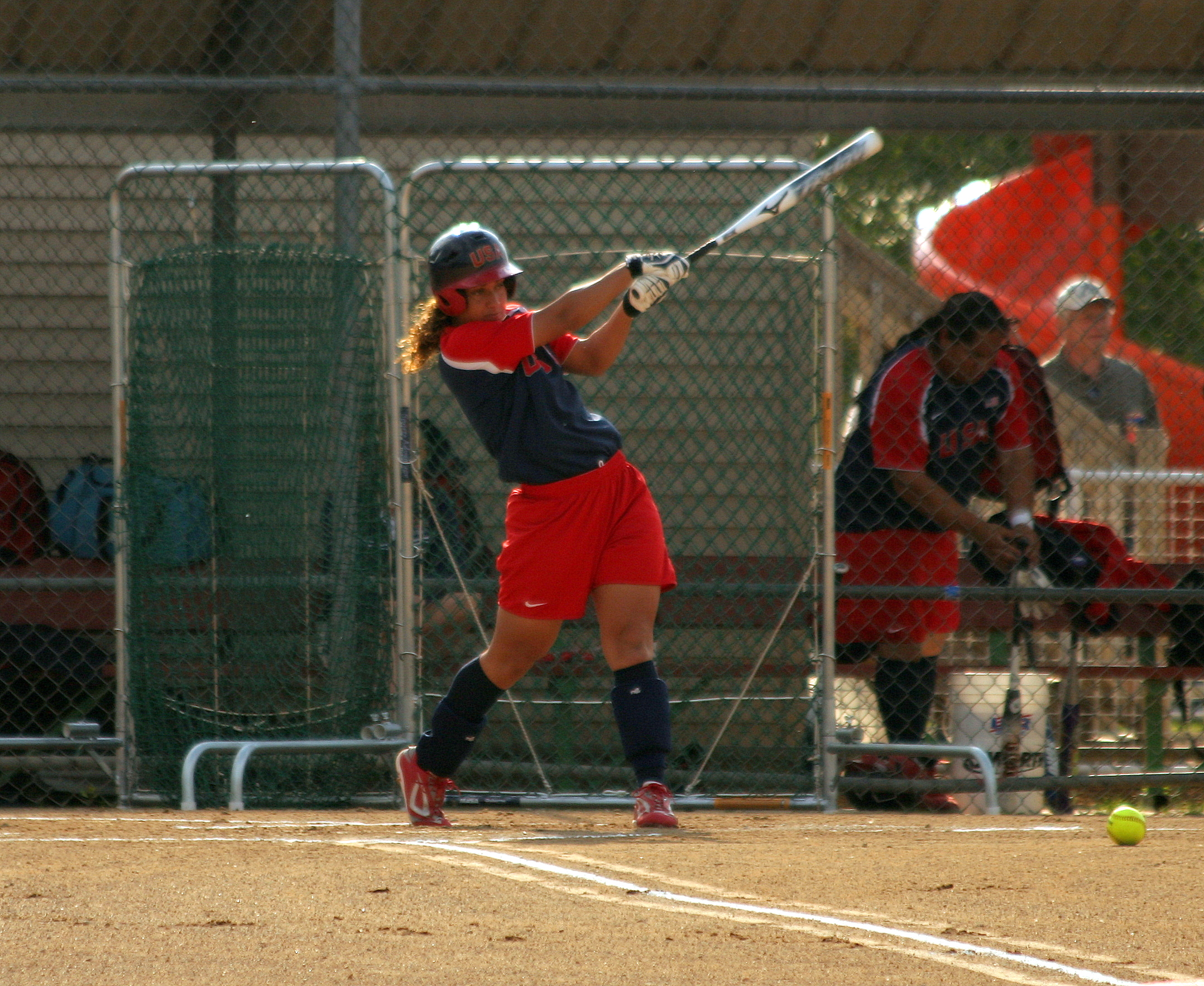
- Flowers in 2008

Current position
- Title: Head coach
- Team: Loyola Marymount
- Conference: WCC

Biographical details
- Born: January 9, 1981 (age 45); Tucson, Arizona, U.S.

Playing career
- 2000–2003: UCLA
- 2005: Arizona Heat
- Positions: First base, catcher

Coaching career (HC unless noted)

College Softball
- 2006: UC Riverside (asst.)
- 2007–2010: Long Beach State (asst.)
- 2011–2020: Cal State Northridge
- 2021–present: Loyola Marymount

Professional Softball
- 2026-present: Portland Cascade

National team
- 2019: USA Women's Softball (asst.)

Head coaching record
- Overall: 346–323 (.517)
- Tournaments: NCAA Division I: 2-6

Accomplishments and honors

Championships
- As player: Women's College World Series (2003); 2× WCWS runner-up (2000, 2001); Pac-10 (2002); As head coach: Big West (2015); WCC (2022, 2023)

Awards
- First-team NFCA All-American (2003); Second-team NFCA All-American (2001); 2× first-team All-Pac-10 (2001, 2003); Second-team All-Pac-10 (2002); 3× WCWS All-Tournament (2000, 2001, 2003)
Medal record
Women's softball
Representing the United States
Olympic Games
| Gold medal – first place | 2004 Athens | Team competition |
| Silver medal – second place | 2008 Beijing | Team competition |

Tairia Flowers (née Mims; born January 9, 1981) is an American softball coach and former player who is the head coach at Loyola Marymount University and for the Portland Cascade of the Athletes Unlimited Softball League (AUSL). She played college softball at UCLA, winning a national championship in 2003 and finishing her career in the top-five for RBIs and home runs. Flowers was a member of the United States women's national softball team, winning a gold medal at the 2004 Summer Olympics and a silver medal at the 2008 Summer Olympics.

== Early life and college career ==
Born Tairia Mims in Tucson, Arizona, Flowers graduated from Salpointe Catholic High School in 1999 and played on the UCLA Bruins softball team from 2000 to 2003 at first base and catcher. Helping UCLA make the championship game of the 2000 Women's College World Series, Mims hit .600 for the series and made the All-Tournament team. UCLA also were runners-up in the 2001 Women's College World Series and won the 2003 Women's College World Series. She was a three-time All-Tournament honoree. She was a first-team NFCA All-American and first-team All-Pac-10 honoree in 2003.

=== College Statistics ===
| YEAR | G | AB | R | H | BA | RBI | HR | 3B | 2B | TB | SLG | BB | SO | SB | SBA |
| 2000 | 59 | 160 | 23 | 48 | .300 | 32 | 9 | 0 | 8 | 83 | .518% | 12 | 17 | 1 | 1 |
| 2001 | 68 | 213 | 54 | 80 | .375 | 71 | 17 | 2 | 18 | 153 | .718% | 17 | 25 | 3 | 3 |
| 2002 | 64 | 189 | 34 | 68 | .360 | 55 | 13 | 4 | 16 | 131 | .693% | 26 | 10 | 1 | 1 |
| 2003 | 61 | 178 | 49 | 80 | .449 | 70 | 22 | 1 | 17 | 165 | .927% | 26 | 28 | 7 | 7 |
| TOTALS | 252 | 740 | 160 | 276 | .373 | 228 | 61 | 7 | 59 | 532 | .719% | 81 | 80 | 12 | 12 |

== International career ==
As a member of the United States women's national softball team beginning in 2001, Flowers won gold at the 2002 Women's Softball World Championship, 2003 Pan American Games, 2004 Summer Olympics, 2006 World Cup of Softball, and 2007 Pan American Games and silver at the 2008 Summer Olympics.

== Professional playing career ==
In 2005, Flowers played for the Arizona Heat of National Pro Fastpitch.

== Coaching career ==
In 2006, Flowers was an assistant coach at UC Riverside. From 2007 to 2010, Flowers was an assistant coach at Long Beach State, during which Long Beach State made the NCAA Tournament in 2008 and 2009.

Beginning in 2011, Flowers became head coach at Cal State Northridge. Upon the conclusion of the COVID-19 shortened 2020 season, Flowers had an overall 259–263 record, with her first winning season in 2014 with a 31–26. She is the second-winningest coach in CSUN history. In 2015, Flowers led Cal State Northridge to a 41–17 record (16–5 in the Big West Conference) with an NCAA Tournament appearance and the program's first sole Big West title. In fall 2020 Flowers was named as the head coach at Loyola Marymount University.

On December 23, 2025, Flowers was named as the first head coach for the expansion franchise Portland Cascade of the Athletes Unlimited Softball League (AUSL).

== Personal life ==
Flowers is of African American and European descent. She is married to Jason Flowers and has three children.

== Head coaching record ==
Record table
| Season | Team | Overall | Conference | Standing | Postseason |
|---|---|---|---|---|---|
Cal State Northridge Matadors (Big West Conference) (2011–2020)
| 2011 | Cal State Northridge | 22–31 | 10–11 | 5th | |
| 2012 | Cal State Northridge | 10–42 | 5–16 | T–8th | |
| 2013 | Cal State Northridge | 25–31 | 11–13 | T–6th | |
| 2014 | Cal State Northridge | 31–26 | 8–13 | 6th | |
| 2015 | Cal State Northridge | 41–17 | 16–5 | 1st | NCAA Regional |
| 2016 | Cal State Northridge | 34–22 | 14–7 | 2nd | |
| 2017 | Cal State Northridge | 31–22 | 11–10 | T–2nd | |
| 2018 | Cal State Northridge | 23–36 | 8–13 | 6th | |
| 2019 | Cal State Northridge | 26–28 | 10–11 | 5th | |
| 2020 | Cal State Northridge | 16–8 | 0-0 | ----- | |
Loyola Marymount Lions (West Coast Conference) (2021–present)
| 2021 | Loyola Marymount | 22-21 | 10-5 | 2nd | |
| 2022 | Loyola Marymount | 37-17 | 13-2 | T-1st | NCAA Regional |
| 2023 | Loyola Marymount | 28-22 | 12-3 | 1st | NCAA Regional |
| Cal State Northridge: | | 259–263 (.496) | 93–99 (.484) | | |
| Loyola Marymount: | | 87–60 (.592) | 35–10 (.778) | | |
| Total: | | 346–323 (.517) | | | |
National champion Postseason invitational champion Conference regular season champion Conference regular season and conference tournament champion Division regular season champion Division regular season and conference tournament champion Conference tournament champion
