= Bri Ellis =

American softball player (born 2003)

Talons – No. 77
- Infielder
- Born: January 7, 2003 (age 23); Houston, Texas, U.S.

Teams
- Auburn (2022–2023); Arkansas (2024–2025); Utah Talons (2025–present)

Career highlights and awards
- 2× AUSL champion (2025, 2026); USA Softball Collegiate Player of the Year (2025); Softball America Player of the Year (2025); SEC Player of the Year (2025); Second Team All-American (2024); SEC Freshman of the Year (2022); 2× All-SEC First team (2024, 2025); All-SEC Second team (2022); 2× SEC ALL-Defensive team (2024, 2025)

Brianna Grace Ellis (born January 7, 2003) is an American professional softball player for the Talons of the Athletes Unlimited Softball League (AUSL). She played college softball for Auburn and Arkansas, and was named USA Softball Collegiate Player of the Year in 2025.

== High school career ==
Ellis attended Memorial High School in Hedwig Village, Texas. During her freshman year she was Newcomer of the Year and Memorial High School's Most Valuable Player and Offensive Player of the Year. She finished her career with a career .421 batting average with 80 hits, 99 runs batted in (RBI) and 104 runs scored in her three seasons.

She was ranked as the nation's No. 20 recruit in the Class of 2021 by Extra Inning Softball. On November 11, 2020, she signed her national letter of intent with Auburn.

== College career ==
Ellis began her collegiate career for Auburn in 2022. During her freshman year she played in 56 games, with 55 starts at first base. She hit .302 with 20 home runs, eight doubles, and 49 RBIs. She finished the season tied for the second most home runs in a single season at Auburn, and the most by a freshman. Defensively she committed three errors at first base with 251 putouts and 11 assists for a .989 fielding percentage. Following the season she was named SEC Freshman of the Year, and a top-ten finalist for the NFCA National Freshman of the Year. During her sophomore year in 2023, she started all 62 games, and had a .275 average, with 42 hits, eight doubles, 14 home runs, and 47 RBIs. She led the team with a .601 slugging percentage. Defensively she committed three errors at first base with 264 putouts and 12 assists for a .989 fielding percentage.

On June 19, 2023, Ellis transferred to Arkansas. During her junior year in 2024, she appeared in 55 games, and hit .322, with 48 hits, seven doubles, 14 home runs, and 47 RBI. She led the team with a .651 slugging percentage and .444 on-base percentage. Defensively she recorded 359 putouts and 12 assists for a .989 fielding percentage. Following the season she was named to the All-SEC First team and SEC All-Defensive Team.

During her senior year in 2025, she hit .457, with 58 hits, nine doubles, 26 home runs, and 72 RBIs. She posted a nation-leading 1.142 slugging percentage and .646 on-base percentage. During conference play she hit .397 with 11 home runs, 29 RBIs and 27 walks, with a .983 slugging percentage and .606 on-base percentage. Following an outstanding season, she was named SEC Player of the Year and named to the All-SEC First team and SEC All-Defensive Team. During the second round of the 2025 SEC tournament against Georgia, she hit a walk-off grand slam to help Arkansas advance to the quarterfinals. With her home run, she set the single-season program record for home runs (26) and RBIs (72). She was also named the USA Softball Collegiate Player of the Year and Softball America Player of the Year.

== Professional career ==
On May 3, 2025, Ellis was drafted second overall by the Talons in the 2025 AUSL College Draft. During the 2025 AUSL season, she hit .186 with one home run and eight RBI, and helped the Talons win the inaugural AUSL championship.

== Personal life ==
Ellis was born to Ron and Molly Ellis, and has one sister, Emily. Her father played college football at Rice.
