= Reese Atwood =

American softball player

Carolina Blaze – No. 15
- Catcher
- Born: November 14, 2003 (age 22); Sandia, Texas, U.S.

Teams
- Texas (2023–2026); Carolina Blaze (2026–present)

Career highlights and awards
- AUSL Rookie of the Year (2026); 2× Women's College World Series champion (2025, 2026); WCWS All-Tournament Team (2025); NFCA Catcher of the Year (2025); Softball America Player of the Year (2024); Big 12 Player of the Year (2024); 2× First team All-American (2024, 2025); Second team All-American (2026); All-SEC First Team (2025); 2× All-SEC Defensive Team (2025, 2026); All-Big 12 First Team (2024); All-SEC Second Team (2026); All-Big 12 Second Team (2023); All-Big 12 Freshman Team (2023)

Reese Tate Atwood (born November 14, 2003) is an American professional softball player for the Carolina Blaze of the Athletes Unlimited Softball League (AUSL). She played college softball at Texas and was named Softball America Player of the Year in 2024.

== High school career ==
Atwood attended Tuloso-Midway High School in Corpus Christi, Texas. During the 2021 season, in her junior year, she had a .478 batting average with 33 hits, 10 doubles, eight home runs and 29 runs batted in (RBI) with a .848 on-base percentage. During the 2022 season, in her senior year, she hit .576 with 39 runs scored, 38 hits, 24 walks, 28 extra-base hits, 10 home runs, 43 RBIs and 16 steals while posting a 2.053 slugging percentage. Following the season she was named to the SBLive Texas' First Team All-South Texas.

Atwood was ranked as the nation's No. 1 catcher and No. 5 overall prospect by Extra Inning Softball for the class of 2022. On November 10, 2021, she signed her National Letter of Intent to play at Texas.

== College career ==
Atwood began her collegiate career for the Texas Longhorns in 2023. During her freshman year she appeared in 58 games, with 56 starts, and slashed .291/.313/.529, with 43 RBIs, and 91 total bases. Of her 50 hits, 19 were extra base hits, including a team-leading 11 home runs and eight doubles. She finished the season with a .986 fielding percentage in 290 defensive opportunities while splitting time at catcher and first base. She became the player in program history with a walk-off hit in three consecutive games from April 16 to April 22, 2023.

During her sophomore year in 2024, she batted .433, and led the league in home runs (21), total bases (144), and slugging percentage (.917). She also led the country with 83 RBIs during the regular season. She was named Big 12 Conference player of the week three times this season. She was also named the D1Softball Player and NFCA Player of the Week during the final week of the regular season after hitting .700 with four home runs and 13 RBIs in a series against Texas Tech. Following the season she was named a unanimous All-Big 12 first team selection, and the Big 12 Conference Softball Player of the Year. She was also named the Softball America Player of the Year and a top-three finalist for the USA Softball Collegiate Player of the Year. Atwood set Texas' single-season records in home runs (23), total bases (160) and RBIs (90).

== Professional career ==
On May 4, 2026, Atwood was drafted in the second round, seventh overall, by the Carolina Blaze in the 2026 AUSL College Draft. On June 7, 2026, she signed a rookie contract with the Blaze. Atwood was named the 2026 AUSL Rookie of the Year after a season in which she led all rookies in home runs and RBIs.

== Personal life ==
Atwood was born to Tammy and Geoff Atwood, and has one sibling, Devin. Her mother played college basketball at Blinn College.
