= Portland Cascade =

American softball team

- Sport: Softball
- Founded: 2025
- League: Athletes Unlimited Softball League
- Based in: Hillsboro, Oregon
- Stadium: Hillsboro Ballpark
- Colors: Navy, light blue and red
- Head coach: Tairia Flowers
- General manager: Jami Lobpries
- Website: theausl.com/cascade

The Portland Cascade are a women's professional softball team based in Hillsboro, Oregon, that competes in Athletes Unlimited Softball League (AUSL). The Cascade play their home games at Hillsboro Ballpark.

== History ==
In June 2024, Athletes Unlimited announced the creation of the Athletes Unlimited Softball League, which featured four teams. The league used a touring model in its first season, but switched to city-based format for the 2026 season. In November 2025, the Cascade were announced as an expansion team for the 2026 season. On December 23, 2025, Tairia Flowers was named the inaugural head coach of the Cascade. In January 2026, Portland was announced as the home of the Cascade.

== Roster ==
Portland Cascade roster
Active roster	Coaching staff
Pitchers: 18 Kenzie Brown; 33 Payton Gottshall; 10 Carley Hoover; 21 Sam Landry; 28 Kelly Maxwell; Utility players: 43 Megan Grant; Catchers: 77 Mia Davidson; 24 Sydney Stewart; Infielders: 22 Sis Bates; 31 Kenleigh Cahalan; 1 Kennedy Powell; 38 Paige Sinicki; 29 Tori Vidales; Outfielders: 27 Kendra Falby; 3 Korbe Otis; 12 Sierra Sacco	Manager: Jami Lobpries; Coaches: Tairia Flowers; Roster updated on July 18, 2026: Disabled list; ‡ Inactive list; § Suspended list
