= NiJaree Canady =

American softball player (born 2003)

Texas Volts – No. 24
- Pitcher
- Born: July 30, 2003 (age 22); Topeka, Kansas, U.S.
- Bats: Right Throws: Right

Teams
- Stanford (2023–2024); Texas Tech (2025–2026); Texas Volts (2026–present)

Career highlights and awards
- 2× First Team All-American (2024, 2025); Second Team All-American (2026); USA Softball Collegiate Player of the Year (2024); 2× NFCA National Pitcher of the Year (2024, 2025); Softball America Pitcher of the Year (2024); Pac-12 Pitcher of the Year (2024); 2× Big 12 Pitcher of the Year (2025, 2026); 4× WCWS All-Tournament Team (2023, 2024, 2025, 2026); 2× Honda Sports Award (2024, 2025); NFCA National Freshman of the Year (2023); Softball America Freshman of the Year (2023); 2× First team All-Big 12 (2025, 2026); 2× First team All-Pac-12 (2023, 2024); All-Pac-12 Freshman team (2023)

NiJaree Canady (born July 30, 2003) is an American professional softball pitcher for the Texas Volts of the Athletes Unlimited Softball League (AUSL). She played college softball at Stanford and Texas Tech. As a freshman in 2023, she was named NFCA National Freshman of the Year. As a sophomore in 2024, she was named USA Softball Collegiate Player of the Year.

== High school career ==
Canady attended Topeka High School in Topeka, Kansas, where she was a two-sport athlete, playing both basketball and softball.

In basketball, during her freshman year in 2018, she averaged 20.6 points and 10.6 rebounds per game and led the Trojans to a 22–3 record. During her sophomore year in 2019, she averaged 18.8 points and 10.2 rebounds per game and led the Trojans to a 23–0 record, before the postseason was canceled due to the COVID-19 pandemic. During her junior year in 2020, she averaged a league-best 20.6 points and 12.3 rebounds per game and led the Trojans to a 23–2 record and a second-place finish at the 6A state tournament. She was named first team All-League, first team All-City, and first team All-State all three years of playing basketball.

In softball, during her junior year in 2021, she posted a 21–0 record with a 0.26 ERA and 232 Strikeouts in 107 2/3 innings. Offensively she hit .478 with 13 home runs and 49 RBI. In the Class 6A state tournament, she struck out 16 batters in each of three tournament games, and gave up just six hits and no earned runs at the tournament, to help the Trojans win their first ever state championship. She was subsequently named the Kansas Softball Gatorade Player of the Year. On October 12, 2021, Canady announced her commitment to Stanford, and would forgo her senior year of basketball to focus on softball. During her senior year in 2022, she posted a 13–1 record with a 0.84 ERA and 163 strikeouts in 74 2/3 innings. Offensively she hit .530 with seven home runs, 37 runs scored, and 42 RBI. She helped lead the Trojans to a second straight Class 6A state championship. Following the season, she was named Kansas Softball Gatorade Player of the Year for the second consecutive year.

== College career ==
=== Stanford ===
As a freshman as Stanford during the 2023 season, Canady posted a 17–3 record with four saves in 24 starts and nine relief appearances. Two of her three losses came against 2023 Women's College World Series champion Oklahoma, which lost only one game all year. She led the nation in ERA (0.57) and strikeouts per seven innings (11.3) and ranked third in hits allowed per seven innings (3.32). She recorded 218 strikeouts in 135 innings, allowed only one home run all year, pitched two no-hitters, and pitched ten complete games, eight of which were shutouts. Her first career no-hitter took place on February 12, 2023, against Liberty. She pitched her second no-hitter on March 3 against Villanova, striking out 18 batters, one short of the record of 19 set by Missy Penna in 2009. She became the first Stanford player with multiple no-hitters in a season since Teagan Gerhart had three in 2010. She helped lead Stanford to the Women's College World Series for the first time since 2004. Following the season she was named a first-team all-Pac-12 honoree and All-Pac-12 freshman team selection. She was also named to the inaugural D1Softball All-American Freshman Team and named NFCA National Freshman of the Year and Softball America Freshman of the Year.

As a sophomore during the 2024 season, Canady posted a 24–7 record with five saves. She led the nation with a 0.73 ERA, and 337 strikeouts, ranked third in strikeout-to-walk ratio (9.72). She led the Pac-12 in strikeouts per seven innings (10.7) and recorded a career-high 243 strikeouts in 168 2/3 innings during the regular season. She also pitched 24 complete games and nine shutouts. She surrendered multiple runs in just three games, in 37 appearances, and recorded 18 double-digit strikeout performances. Her five saves tied for the conference lead. She pitched all 26 innings for Stanford at the 2024 Women's College World Series and allowed just six runs as the Cardinal advanced to the semifinals, before being eliminated by the No. 1 seed Texas. She was subsequently named to the Women's College World Series all-tournament team. Following an outstanding season she was named Pac-12 Pitcher of the Year, Softball America Pitcher of the Year, NFCA National Pitcher of the Year, and USA Softball Collegiate Player of the Year. She also won the Honda Sports Award for softball.

On June 17, 2024, Canady entered the NCAA transfer portal. During two seasons at Stanford she posted a 41–10 record with nine saves, a 0.66 ERA, and 555 strikeouts with 65 walks in 366 2/3 innings.

=== Texas Tech ===
On July 24, 2024, Canady announced she would transfer to Texas Tech. She also signed a $1 million NIL deal, the highest ever for a college softball player. As a junior during the 2025 season, Canady posted a 34–7 record and led the nation with a 0.97 ERA, and ranked second with 317 strikeouts. She helped Texas Tech win the Big 12 regular-season and Big 12 Tournament championships for the first time in program history. During the Big 12 Tournament, she allowed four hits, three walks, and no runs with 26 strikeouts in 16 2/3 innings. She was subsequently named to the all-tournament team and Most Outstanding Player of the tournament. During the 2025 NCAA Division I softball tournament, she helped the Red Raiders advance to the Women's College World Series for the first time in program history. She threw 686 consecutive pitches dating to the start of Super Regionals before being eliminated by Texas in the finals. Following the season she was named the Big 12 Pitcher of the Year. She was also named the NFCA National Pitcher of the Year for the second consecutive year.

On June 6, 2025, Canady signed a $1.2 million NIL deal with Texas Tech. On August 7, 2025, Canady was unveiled as a brand ambassador for Venmo as part of the Big 12 Conference's new partnership with the digital-payments platform.

== Professional career ==
On May 4, 2026, Canady was drafted second overall by the Texas Volts in the 2026 AUSL College Draft. On June 12, 2026, she signed with the Volts.
