= Kenleigh Cahalan =

American softball player

Biographical details
- Born: March 31, 2005 (age 21)

Playing career
- 2023–2024: Alabama
- 2025–2026: Florida
- 2026-present: Portland Cascade
- Position: Shortstop

Accomplishments and honors

Awards
- Second-team All-SEC (2024, 2026)

Kenleigh Renee Cahalan (born March 31, 2005) is an American professional softball player for the Portland Cascade of the Athletes Unlimited Softball League (AUSL). She played college softball at Alabama and Florida.

== High school career ==
Kahalan attended Hewitt-Trussville High School in Trussville, Alabama. She was the 2022 Miss Alabama Softball, 2022 MaxPreps Alabama Player of the Year, and was ranked the number one overall player in the 2023 recruiting class by Perfect Game Softball. She played for the PGF under-18 Birmingham Thunderbolts team. Her top two schools were Alabama and LSU, and she officially committed to Alabama on September 27, 2021.

== College career ==
After enrolling early at Alabama, Cahalan was able to begin play in the 2023 season. In her freshman season at Alabama, she started all 67 games for the team, usually at shortstop. In her sophomore season, she started all 59 games for the Crimson Tide while slashing .296/.356/.425. After the season, Cahalan announced her entry into the transfer portal. She eventually committed to Florida.

As a junior in 2025, Cahalan played primarily at third base, slashing .302/.390/.536. In her senior season, Cahalan earned a Golden Ticket, guaranteeing her selection in the 2026 AUSL Draft. She hit 17 home runs for Florida in 2026, amassing a career-high batting average of .377.

== Professional career ==
Cahalan was selected in the fourth round, 17th overall, by the Portland Cascade in the 2026 AUSL college draft.

In her rookie season with the Cascade, Cahalan played in all 25 games, slashing .222/.342/.413. She played in the 2026 AUSL play-in game, going 1-for-5 with an RBI as the Cascade lost in extra innings to the Chicago Bandits.
