= 2025 AUSL season =

Softball season

- League: Athletes Unlimited Softball League
- Sport: Softball
- Duration: June 7 - July 27, 2025
- Teams: 4
- TV partner(s): ESPN; All Women's Sports Network; NESN Nation; MLB Network; Regional networks (Note: Including: FanDuel Sports Network, MSG Networks, WPWR-TV/WFLD, Marquee Sports Network, SportsNet Pittsburgh and NESN); MLB.com

Draft
- Top draft pick: Allocation draft: Lexi Kilfoyl; College draft: Sam Landry
- Picked by: Allocation draft: Bandits; College draft: Volts

Regular Season
- Season champions: Talons
- Season MVP: Erin Coffel

AUSL Championship
- Champions: Talons
- Runners-up: Bandits

Seasons
- 2026 →

The 2025 season of Athletes Unlimited Softball League was the inaugural season of the league, which began on June 7, 2025. The Talons defeated the Bandits in a best-of-three championship series to win the inaugural AUSL championship.

== 2025 College Draft ==
It was announced on April 13, 2025, that the College Draft would air on ESPNU on May 3, 2025. Prior to the draft, players received golden tickets notifying them they were eligible for the draft. Sam Landry was drafted first overall by the Volts in the 2025 AUSL Draft.

=== First Round ===
Pick	Name	Team	Position	College
1	Sam Landry	Volts	Pitcher	Oklahoma
2	Bri Ellis	Talons	Infield	Arkansas
3	Emma Lemley	Blaze	Pitcher	Virginia Tech
4	Cori McMillan	Bandits	Utility	Virginia Tech

=== Second Round ===
Pick	Name	Team	Position	College
5	Sierra Sacco	Talons	Outfield	Mississippi State
6	Korbe Otis	Blaze	Outfield	Florida
7	Emiley Kennedy	Bandits	Pitcher	Texas A&M
8	Michaela Edenfield	Volts	Catcher	Florida State

=== Third Round ===
Pick	Name	Team	Position	College
9	Ana Gold	Blaze	Infield	Duke
10	Devyn Netz	Bandits	Pitcher	Arizona
11	Danieca Coffey	Volts	Utility	LSU
12	Raelin Chaffin	Talons	Pitcher	Mississippi State

== Teams ==
=== Bandits ===
No.	Player	Pos.	College
3	Odicci Alexander	RHP	James Madison
21	Erin Coffel	IF	Kentucky
33	Mia Davidson	C	Mississippi State
6	Bella Dayton	OF	Texas
11	Emiley Kennedy	P	Texas A&M
8	Lexi Kilfoyl	RHP	Oklahoma State
26	Sydney McKinney	IF	Wichita State
2	Cori McMillan	UTIL	Virginia Tech
82	Taylor McQuillin	LHP	Arizona
34	Devyn Netz	P	Arizona
48	Bubba Nickles-Camarena	OF	UCLA
41	Jordan Roberts	C	Florida
17	Skylar Wallace	IF	Florida
66	Sarah Willis	RHP	UCF
97	Delanie Wisz	IF	UCLA
18	Morgan Zerkle	OF	Marshall

Coaching Staff

General Manager	Jenny Dalton-Hill
Head coach	Stacey Nuveman-Deniz
Associate Head Coach	Courtney Martinez
Assistant Coach	Grace French
Assistant Coach	Mike Lotief

=== Blaze ===
No.	Player	Pos.	College
11	Aliyah Andrews	OF	LSU
88	Ciara Briggs	OF	LSU
12	Taylor Edwards	C	Nebraska
41	Danielle Gibson Whorton	IF	Arkansas
4	Ana Gold	IF	Duke
7	Kalei Harding	OF	Florida State
22	Carley Hoover	RHP	LSU
3	Baylee Klingler	RHP	Washington
99	Kayla Kowalik	UTIL	Kentucky
75	Aubrey Leach	IF	Tennessee
27	Emma Lemley	P	Virginia Tech
8	Aleshia Ocasio	RHP	Florida
33	Korbe Otis	OF	Florida
10	Keilani Ricketts	LHP	Oklahoma
93	Hope Trautwein-Valdespino	RHP	Oklahoma
17	Anissa Urtez	IF	Utah
15	Alana Vawter	RHP	Stanford

Coaching Staff

General Manager	Dana Sorensen
Head coach	Alisa Goler
Associate Head Coach	Kara Dill
Assistant Coach	Sue Kunkle
Assistant Coach	Ryan Wondrasek

=== Talons ===
No.	Player	Pos.	College
3	Ali Aguilar	IF	Washington
7	Maya Brady	UTIL	UCLA
25	Raelin Chaffin	P	Mississippi State
22	Georgina Corrick	RHP	South Florida
77	Bri Ellis	IF	Arkansas
80	Megan Faraimo	RHP	UCLA
19	Hannah Flippen	IF	Utah
14	Montana Fouts	RHP	Alabama
1	Victoria Hayward	OF	Washington
51	Caroline Jacobsen	OF	Clemson
27	Sahvanna Jaquish	UTIL	LSU
8	Mariah Lopez	LHP	Utah
13	Sharlize Palacios	C	UCLA
2	Sydney Romero	IF	Oklahoma
21	Sierra Sacco	OF	Mississippi State
29	Tori Vidales	IF	Texas A&M

Coaching Staff

General Manager	Lisa Fernandez
Head coach	Howard Dobson
Associate Head Coach	Kirk Walker
Assistant Coach	Jo Koons
Assistant Coach	Alex Ibarra	(First week only)
Assistant Coach	Will Oldham	(Remainder of Season)

=== Volts ===
No.	Player	Pos.	College
22	Sis Bates	IF	Washington
86	McKenzie Clark	OF	Clemson
13	Danieca Coffey	UTIL	LSU
51	Michaela Edenfield	C	Florida State
00	Rachel Garcia	RHP	UCLA
33	Payton Gottshall	RHP	Tennessee
23	Tiare Jennings	IF	Oklahoma
21	Sam Landry	P	Oklahoma
18	Amanda Lorenz	OF	Florida
34	Mariah Mazon	RHP	Oregon State
2	Dejah Mulipola	C	Arizona
20	Erika Piancastelli	OF	McNeese Cowgirls softball
32	Sierra Romero	IF	Michigan Wolverines softball
3	Sam Show	UTIL	Oklahoma State
7	Kelsey Stewart-Hunter	IF	Florida
30	Jessi Warren	IF	Florida State

Coaching Staff

General Manager	Cat Osterman
Head coach	Kelly Kretschman
Associate Head Coach	Courtney Gettins
Assistant Coach	Kristen Zaleski
Assistant Coach	Josh Eurich

== Venues ==
Stadium Name	Location
Dell Diamond	Round Rock, TX
Dumke Family Softball Stadium	Salt Lake City, UT
Connie Claussen Field	Omaha, NE
Husky Softball Stadium	Seattle, WA
Jim Frost Stadium	Chattanooga, TN
Love's Field	Norman, OK
McMurry Park	Sulphur, LA
Parkway Bank Sports Complex	Rosemont, IL
Rhoads Stadium	Tuscaloosa, AL
Wilkins Stadium	Wichita, KS

== Standings ==
Team	GP	W	L	Pct.	GB
Talons	24	18	6	.750	—
Bandits	24	15	9	.625	3
Volts	24	8	16	.333	10
Blaze	24	7	17	.292	11

== Schedule ==
Each team played 24 games, with a total of 48 games played between four teams during the season. The games were played in a tour format across the United States in at least ten cities.

2025 AUSL regular season
June

Date	Time (CT)	Matchup			TV	Result	Location
Saturday, June 7	2:00 p.m.	Talons	vs	Bandits	MLB.com	1–3	Parkway Bank Sports Complex
Saturday, June 7	5:00 p.m.	Volts	vs	Blaze	MLB Network	5–1	Wilkins Stadium
Sunday, June 8	1:00 p.m.	Talons	vs	Bandits	MLB.com	6–3	Parkway Bank Sports Complex
Sunday, June 8	4:00 p.m.	Volts	vs	Blaze	MLB.com	10–3	Wilkins Stadium
Monday, June 9	6:00 p.m.	Volts	vs	Blaze	MLB.com	1–3	Wilkins Stadium
Tuesday, June 10	1:00 p.m.	Talons	vs	Bandits	ESPN 2	0–8 ^{(5)}	Parkway Bank Sports Complex
Thursday, June 12	6:00 p.m.	Volts	vs	Bandits	ESPN 2	5–6 ^{(9)}	McMurry Park
Friday, June 13	8:00 p.m.	Volts	vs	Bandits	MLB.com	1–6	McMurry Park
Saturday, June 14	11:00 a.m.	Talons	vs	Blaze	ESPNU	14–12	Jim Frost Stadium
Saturday, June 14	5:30 p.m.	Talons	vs	Blaze	MLB.com	7–6	Jim Frost Stadium
Saturday, June 14	8:00 p.m.	Volts	vs	Bandits	MLB Network	0–6	McMurry Park
Sunday, June 15	1:00 p.m.	Talons	vs	Blaze	MLB.com	10–8	Jim Frost Stadium
Wednesday, June 18	6:00 p.m.	Bandits	vs	Talons	MLB.com	4–5	Wilkins Stadium
Wednesday, June 18	6:00 p.m.	Blaze	vs	Volts	MLB.com	1–6	Wilkins Stadium
Thursday, June 19	1:00 p.m.	Bandits	vs	Talons	ESPNU	8–4	Wilkins Stadium
Thursday, June 19	3:30 p.m.	Blaze	vs	Volts	ESPNU	2–9	Wilkins Stadium
Friday, June 20	6:00 p.m.	Bandits	vs	Blaze	ESPNU	11–2 ^{(5)}	Wilkins Stadium
Friday, June 20	7:30 p.m.	Talons	vs	Volts	MLB.com	3–2	Love's Field
Saturday, June 21	4:00 p.m.	Talons	vs	Volts	ESPNU	4–0	Love's Field
Saturday, June 21	6:00 p.m.	Bandits	vs	Blaze	MLB Network	11–3	Wilkins Stadium
Sunday, June 22	4:00 p.m.	Bandits	vs	Blaze	MLB.com	9–7	Wilkins Stadium
Sunday, June 22	6:00 p.m.	Talons	vs	Volts	ESPNU	8–3	Love's Field
Monday, June 23	5:30 p.m.	Bandits	vs	Blaze	MLB.com	3–11 ^{(6)}	Wilkins Stadium
Monday, June 23	7:30 p.m.	Talons	vs	Volts	MLB.com	8–6	Love's Fields

July

Date	Time (CT)	Matchup			TV	Result	Location
Monday, July 7	6:00 p.m.	Bandits	vs	Volts	ESPN2	3–5	Parkway Bank Sports Complex
Monday, July 7	6:00 p.m.	Blaze	vs	Talons	ESPN2	1–9 ^{(5)}	Parkway Bank Sports Complex
Tuesday, July 8	6:00 p.m.	Blaze	vs	Bandits	MLB.com	12–10	Parkway Bank Sports Complex
Tuesday, July 8	6:00 p.m.	Volts	vs	Talons	MLB.com	0–4	Parkway Bank Sports Complex
Wednesday, July 9	10:30 a.m.	Blaze	vs	Bandits	MLB.com	4–5 ^{(8)}	Parkway Bank Sports Complex
Wednesday, July 9	10:30 a.m.	Volts	vs	Talons	MLB.com	0–2	Parkway Bank Sports Complex
Friday, July 11	6:00 p.m.	Bandits	vs	Talons	ESPNU	7–8 ^{(8)}	Connie Claussen Field
Friday, July 11	9:00 p.m.	Blaze	vs	Volts	MLB.com	6–11	Husky Softball Stadium
Saturday, July 12	6:00 p.m.	Bandits	vs	Talons	MLB Network	9–1 ^{(6)}	Connie Claussen Field
Saturday, July 12	8:00 p.m.	Blaze	vs	Volts	MLB.com	3–1	Husky Softball Stadium
Sunday, July 13	12:00 p.m.	Bandits	vs	Talons	ESPN2	3–6	Connie Claussen Field
Sunday, July 13	3:00 p.m.	Blaze	vs	Volts	MLB.com	10–2	Husky Softball Stadium
Wednesday, July 16	6:00 p.m.	Blaze	vs	Talons	ESPNU	1–4	Dumke Family Softball Stadium
Thursday, July 17	6:00 p.m.	Bandits	vs	Volts	ESPN2	8–7	Dell Diamond
Thursday, July 17	8:00 p.m.	Blaze	vs	Talons	MLB Network	4–5	Dumke Family Softball Stadium
Friday, July 18	7:00 p.m.	Bandits	vs	Volts	ESPNU	9–2	Dell Diamond
Friday, July 18	8:00 p.m.	Talons	vs	Blaze	MLB.com	3–2	Dumke Family Softball Stadium
Saturday, July 19	5:00 p.m.	Talons	vs	Blaze	MLB.com	0–2	Dumke Family Softball Stadium
Saturday, July 19	7:00 p.m.	Volts	vs	Bandits	MLB.com	3–4	Dell Diamond
Sunday, July 20	6:00 p.m.	Volts	vs	Bandits	MLB.com	7–5	Dell Diamond
Tuesday, July 22	6:00 p.m.	Volts	vs	Talons	ESPNU	4–6	Rhoads Stadium
Tuesday, July 22	7:30 p.m.	Blaze	vs	Bandits	MLB.com	12–6	Parkway Bank Sports Complex
Wednesday, July 23	6:00 p.m.	Volts	vs	Talons	ESPNU	6–4	Rhoads Stadium
Wednesday, July 23	7:30 p.m.	Blaze	vs	Bandits	MLB.com	1–5	Parkway Bank Sports Complex

Postseason

Date	Time (CT)	Matchup			TV	Result	Location
July 26	4:00 p.m.	Bandits	vs	Talons	ESPN2	1–3	Tuscaloosa, AL
July 27	3:00 p.m.	Talons	vs	Bandits	ESPN2	1–0	Tuscaloosa, AL

== Media coverage ==
Nationally, games will be broadcast on ESPN (40 games across ESPN2, ESPNU and ESPN+), MLB.com (32 games), All-Women’s Sports Network (19 games), NESN Nation (7 games) and MLB Network (5 games). Only games on ESPN platforms and MLB Network will be exclusive. All non-ESPN games will stream on MLB.com.

Regionally, games will air on FanDuel Sports Network (27 games), MSG Networks (27 games), WPWR-TV/WFLD (27 games), Marquee Sports Network (20 games), SportsNet Pittsburgh (19 games), and NESN (17 games).

For all games, Eric Collins, Chuckie Kempf or Mark Neely will serve as play-by-play commentators, Amanda Scarborough (lead), Danielle Lawrie, Jessica Mendoza, Natasha Watley and Kenzie Fowler will serve as color commentators, and Savanna Collins will serve as an on-field reporter.
