= Erin Coffel =

American softball player (born 2002)

Chicago Bandits – No. 21
- Infielder
- Born: February 28, 2002 (age 24); Bremen, Indiana, U.S.

Teams
- Kentucky (2021–2024); Chicago Bandits (2025–present)

Career highlights and awards
- AUSL MVP (2025); AUSL Hitter of the Year (2025); 2× Second Team All-American (2022–2023); Third Team All-American (2024); 3× All-SEC First team (2022–2024); All-SEC Second team (2021); SEC All-Freshman team (2021)
Medals
Women's softball
Representing the United States
Pan American Games
| Gold medal – first place | 2023 Santiago | Team |

Erin Beth Coffel (born February 28, 2002) is an American professional softball player for the Chicago Bandits of the Athletes Unlimited Softball League (AUSL). She played college softball at Kentucky. She was named the inaugural AUSL MVP in 2025.

== High school career ==
Coffel attended Bremen High School in Bremen, Indiana. During her junior year in 2019, she batted .691 with 19 home runs, 52 run batted in (RBI), with a .760 on-base percentage, 1.543 slugging percentage and a 2.217 on-base plus slugging (OPS) and led the Lions to the Class 2A state championship. Following the season, she was named the Indiana Gatorade Player of the Year. During her senior year in 2020, that was cancelled due to the COVID-19 pandemic, she batted .432 with 18 home runs and 58 RBI and led the Indiana Magic Gold to a third-place finish at the PGF Premier 16U Nationals. She was subsequently named Indiana Gatorade Player of the Year for the second consecutive year. She also played basketball and helped lead the Lions to the 2020 Class 2A Fairfield Sectional with a game-high 20 points, their first sectional championship since 2004.

She finished her high school career with a .627 average, 168 hits, 191 runs, 164 RBI and a state-record 50 home runs. She was ranked No. 7 in the FloSoftball Hot 100 ranking for the class of 2020. On November 18, 2019, she committed to playing college softball in Kentucky.

== College career ==
Coffel began her collegiate career for Kentucky in 2021. During her freshman year, she appeared in 59 games, and hit .337 with 60 hits, eight doubles, one triple, 16 home runs, and 56 RBI. Her 16 home runs set a freshman program record. Following the season, she was named to the SEC All-Freshman and All-SEC second teams.

During her sophomore year in 2022, she appeared in 56 games and hit .423, with 69 hits, 11 doubles, one triple, 20 home runs, and 68 RBI. Her 68 RBI set a single-season program record. On May 20, 2022, during the first round of the 2022 NCAA Division I softball tournament against Miami (OH), she recorded a single-game program record of seven RBI. Following the season, she was named to the All-SEC first team and a NFCA Second Team All-American, becoming the sixth All-American in program history.

During her junior year in 2023, she appeared in 54 games and hit .440, with 55 hits, ten doubles, 19 home runs, and 55 RBI. She led the NCAA in walks (62), on-base percentage (.626), and OPS (1.595) and ranked second in slugging percentage (.968). Following the season, she was named to the All-SEC first team and a NFCA Second Team All-American for the second consecutive year.

During her senior year in 2024, she appeared in 55 games and hit .319, with 46 hits, 12 doubles, 13 home runs, and 33 RBI. Following the season, she was named to the All-SEC first team for the third consecutive year and named to the All-SEC defensive team at shortstop. She was also named an NFCA Third Team All-American, becoming the first three-time All-American in program history. She finished her collegiate career with 230 hits, 189 runs scored, 212 RBI, 155 walks and 68 home runs in 224 career games. She is Kentucky's all-time leader in home runs, RBI and walks.

== Professional career ==
On January 29, 2025, Coffel was drafted in the sixth round, 24th overall, by the Bandits in the inaugural Athletes Unlimited Softball League draft. During the 2025 AUSL season, she hit .410 with 25 hits, five doubles, four triples, five home runs and 28 RBI. She led the league in triples, RBI, hit by pitch (13), on-base percentage (.566) and slugging percentage (.869). Following the season, she was named AUSL Hitter of the Year and AUSL MVP.

== International career ==
On August 31, 2023, Coffel was named to the United States women's national softball team for the 2023 Pan American Games. During the tournament, she hit .417 with one home run and four RBI to help the United States win a gold medal. On August 3, 2026, Coffel won a gold medal representing the United States at the USA Softball International Cup.
