= Texas Volts =

American softball team

- Sport: Softball
- Founded: 2024
- League: Athletes Unlimited Softball League
- Based in: Round Rock, Texas
- Stadium: Dell Diamond
- Colors: Purple and yellow
- Head coach: Ricci Woodard
- General manager: Cat Osterman
- Website: theausl.com/volts

The Texas Volts are a women's professional softball team based in Round Rock, Texas, that competes in Athletes Unlimited Softball League (AUSL). The Volts play their home games at Dell Diamond.

== History ==
In June 2024, Athletes Unlimited announced the creation of the Athletes Unlimited Softball League, which featured four teams. In December 2024, the Volts were revealed as the name of one of the original four teams, with Cat Osterman serving as general manager and Kelly Kretschman serving as head coach.

The league used a touring model in its inaugural 2025 season, and the Volts finished in third place with an 8–16 record. The AUSL switched to a city-based format for the 2026 season. On November 24, 2025, Ricci Woodard was named the new head coach of the Volts. In January 2026, Texas was announced as the home of the Volts.

== Roster ==
Texas Volts roster
Active roster	Coaching staff
Pitchers: 4 Aliyah Binford; 24 NiJaree Canady; 3 Ally Carda; 40 Alyssa Denham; 00 Rachel Garcia; 44 Jessica Mullins; Utility players: 13 Danieca Coffey; 20 Jackie Lis; Catchers: 51 Michaela Edenfield; 2 Dejah Mulipola; Infielders: 43 Leighann Goode; 23 Tiare Jennings; 32 Sierra Romero; 7 Kelsey Stewart-Hunter; Outfielders: 5 Rylie Boone; 12 Jaydyn Goodwin; 1 Jalia Lassiter	Manager: Cat Osterman; Coaches: Ricci Woodard; Roster updated on July 18, 2026: Disabled list; ‡ Inactive list; § Suspended list

== Season-by-season results ==
Season	Finish	Wins	Losses	Win pct.	Playoffs
2025	3rd	8	16	.333	Did not qualify
