= Taylor McQuillin =

American softball player

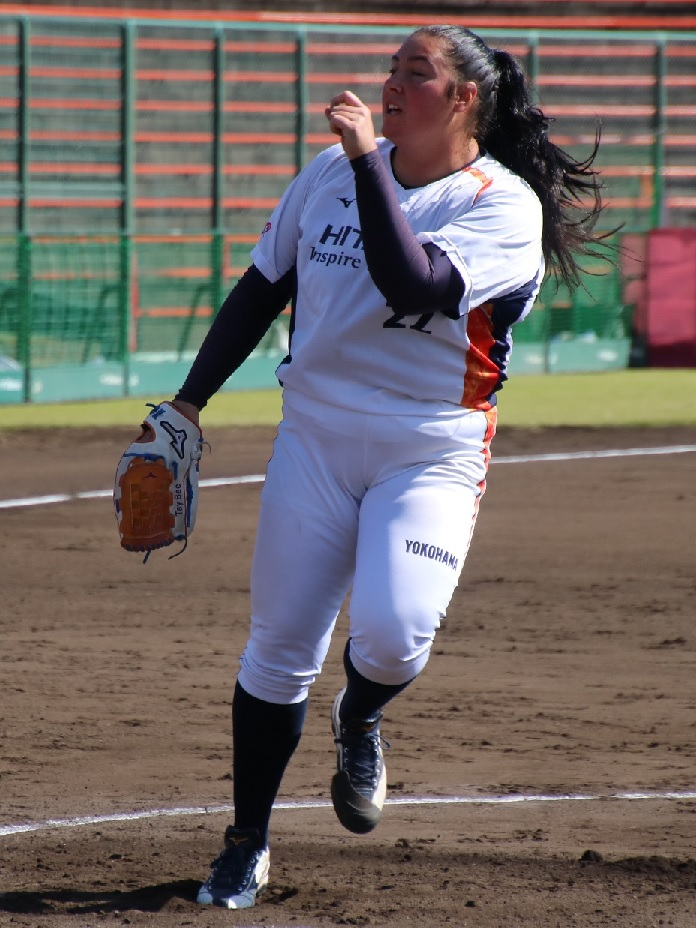
- McQuillin in 2023

Personal information
- Born: October 17, 1996 (age 30) Long Beach, California, U.S.
- Height: 5 ft 8 in (1.73 m)
- Weight: 120 kg (265 lb)

Sport
- Country: USA
- Sport: Softball
- College team: Arizona Wildcats
- Team: Hitachi Sundiva (2022–2023); Chicago Bandits (2025–present)

Taylor Elizabeth McQuillin (born October 17, 1996) is a Mexican-American professional softball player for the Chicago Bandits of the Athletes Unlimited Softball League (AUSL). She played college softball at Arizona, where she was a starting pitcher. In her senior year, McQuillin led Arizona softball to a berth in the 2019 Women's College World Series after being absent for nearly a decade.

After graduating from college, McQuillin was selected sixth overall by the Cleveland Comets in the second round of the 2019 NPF Draft. McQuillin is a member of the Mexico women's national softball team that placed fourth at the 2020 Summer Olympics. She played in the inaugural season of Athletes Unlimited Softball league.

== Early life ==
McQuillin attended Mission Viejo High School. McQuillin is legally blind in her left eye due to Duane syndrome.

== College career ==
At Arizona, McQuillin began her career as a Third-Team All-Pac-12 performer. She debuted on February 12, 2016, throwing a shutout with 6 strikeouts against the Southern Utah Thunderbirds. In 2017, she was named conference Second Team and had a career best strikeout ratio (9.2). McQuillin opened the season by striking out a career best 17 batters in a shutout win over the CSUN Matadors.

As a junior, she set season highs in wins, strikeouts (school top-10 record), shutouts (led the NCAA) and innings pitched. She was also named a First Team All-Pac-12 honoree. Facing the New Mexico Lobos on February 11, 2018, McQuillin threw a no hitter and began a career highlight of 14 consecutive wins, until suffering a loss to the Washington Huskies on March 23. For the streak, she tossed 93.0 innings, allowing 35 hits, 2 earned runs, 22 walks and amassing 121 strikeouts, resulting in a 0.15 ERA and 0.61 WHIP. For one of the wins on February 22, she sealed the victory with 2.1 scoreless innings and went on a personal best 30.1 shutout streak that was ended in the third inning of a win over the South Dakota Coyotes on March 8. She gave up just 7 hits, 11 walks and fanned 36 for a 0.60 WHIP.

For her final year, she earned her second First Team and fourth overall conference honor and also was recognized a First Team All-American by the National Fastpitch Coaches Association. She set season bests in ERA and WHIP. McQuillin led the Wildcats back to the Women's College World Series and opened with a victory vs. the Washington Huskies on May 30, 2019. McQuillin made her last appearance by pitching four scoreless innings with 6 strikeouts in an elimination loss to the Alabama Crimson Tide on June 1. She would graduate ranking top-10 in career victories (7th), strikeouts (9th) and innings (10th).

== Professional career ==
On January 29, 2025, McQuillin was drafted eighth overall by the Bandits in the inaugural Athletes Unlimited Softball League draft.

== National team career ==
McQuillin was named to the roster for Team Mexico and competed at the 2020 Summer Olympics. She made one appearance and threw 1.2 shutout innings, striking out two batters. McQuillin did not play in the bronze medal game where Mexico lost to Canada 2–3.

== Statistics ==
Arizona Wildcats
YEAR	W	L	GP	GS	CG	SHO	SV	IP	H	R	ER	BB	SO	ERA	WHIP
2016	12	8	29	20	10	2	1	128.0	131	73	58	43	137	3.17	1.36
2017	16	4	39	25	20	6	0	120.1	84	38	32	34	159	1.86	0.98
2018	28	12	44	35	30	15	3	242.0	148	66	58	82	287	1.68	0.95
2019	24	8	35	30	26	10	1	207.0	136	61	45	58	232	1.52	0.93
TOTALS	80	32	133	105	77	33	5	697.1	499	238	193	217	815	1.94	1.02
