= Maya Johnson =

Maya Johnson may refer to:

- Maya Angelou, real surname Johnson
- Maya Johnson (softball), American softball player
