= Aubrey Leach =

American softball player (born 1996)

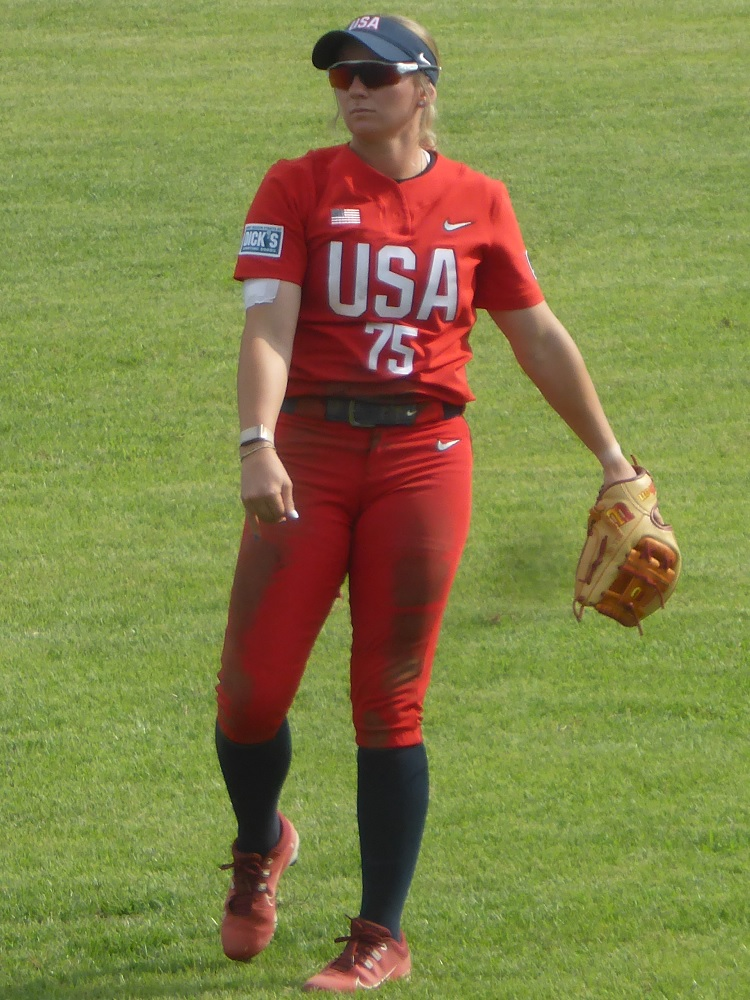
- Leach with team USA in 2024

Blaze – No. 75
- Utility
- Born: August 20, 1996 (age 29); Bolivar, Missouri, U.S.
- Bats: Left Throws: Right

Teams
- Tennessee (2016–2019); Scrap Yard Fast Pitch (2019); Blaze (2025–present)

Career highlights and awards
- First team All-American (2018); Third team All-American (2019); First team All-SEC (2018); Second team All-SEC (2019); SEC All-Freshman team (2016)
Medals
Women's softball
Representing the United States
Pan American Games
Gold medal – first place	2023 Santiago	Team

Aubrey Lynne Leach (born August 20, 1996) is an American professional softball player for the Blaze of the Athletes Unlimited Softball League (AUSL) and member of the United States women's national softball team. She played college softball at Tennessee.

== High school career ==
Leach attended The Woodlands High School. During her junior year in 2014, she posted a .586 batting average with six home runs, eight triples and 48 RBIs en route to a Texas state runner-up finish. She was named a 2014 NFCA First-Team All American. During her senior year in 2015, she posted a .594 batting average with 55 runs, 29 RBIs and 49 stolen bases, and was named a 2015 USA Today First-Team All-American. During her career she posted a .523 batting average, 241 hits, 223 runs, 113 RBIs, 11 home runs and 172 stolen bases.

== College career ==
Leach began her collegiate career for the Tennessee Lady Volunteers in 2016. During her freshman year she hit .348, with 50 hits, ten doubles, 23 RBI and 50 runs. Following the season she was named to the SEC All-Freshman Team. During her sophomore year in 2017, she hit .333, with 58 hits, seven doubles, three triples, two home runs, and 17 RBI, and 60 runs. She led the SEC with 60 runs and ranked second on the team with 22 stolen bases.

During her junior year in 2018, she hit .441, with 82 hits, six doubles, two triples, two home runs, 25 RBI and 80 runs. She led the team in batting average, runs, hits and on base percentage (.571). She set a Tennessee single-season record for runs scored with 80. Following the season she was named to the first-team all-SEC and a first-team All-American. During her senior year in 2019, she hit .385, with 72 hits, seven doubles, one triple, two home runs, 23 RBI and 65 runs. She led the SEC in runs per game (1.08), and led the team in batting average, runs, hits and stolen bases. Following the season she was named a third-team All-American.

She finished collegiate career as the program's all-time leader in runs (253) and walks (162) and ranked second in on-base percentage (.503).

== Professional career ==
On May 31, 2019, Leach signed with the Scrap Yard Fast Pitch of the National Pro Fastpitch (NPF). She then competed in AUX for four years, tallying the second-most points during the 2023 season. She played for the Blaze in the inaugural Athletes Unlimited Softball League season in 2025.

== International career ==
Leach made her United States women's national softball team debut at the 2022 Pan American Championship. On August 31, 2023, she was named to team USA's roster for the 2023 Pan American Games.

On April 25, 2025, she was named an alternate for team USA at the 2025 World Games. On August 3, 2026, she won a gold medal representing the United States at the USA Softball International Cup.

== Coaching career ==
On August 10, 2021, Leach was named a graduate assistant at Tennessee, a position she held for three years. On August 21, 2024, she was named Director of Player Development.

== Personal life ==
Leach was born to Todd and Kaye Leach, and has three younger sisters, Kelcy, and twin sisters Alannah and Gabrielle. Her grandmother, Wilma Ann Williams-Leach, played for the Rockford Peaches of the All-American Girls Professional Baseball League.

She graduated from University of Tennessee with a J.D. degree in May 2024.
