= Baylee Klingler =

American softball pitcher

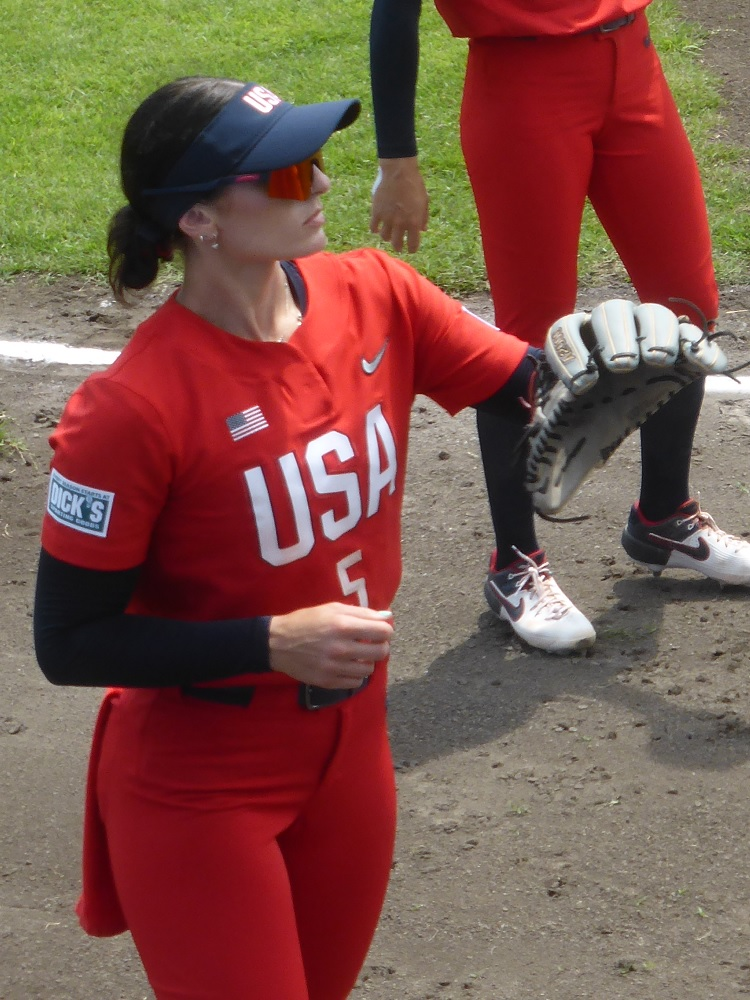
- Klingler with team USA in 2024

Carolina Blaze
- Infielder
- Born: September 20, 1999 (age 26); Houston, Texas, U.S.

Teams
- Texas A&M (2019); Washington (2020–2023); Texas Smoke (2023–2024); Sultanes de Monterrey (2025–present); Carolina Blaze (2025–present)

Career highlights and awards
- Pac-12 Player of the Year (2022); 2× First team All-American (2022, 2023); Second team All-American (2021); 3× First team All-Pac 12 (2021–2023); SEC All-Freshman team (2019)
Medals
Women's softball
Representing the United States
Pan American Games
Gold medal – first place	2023 Santiago	Team
U-19 Women's Softball World Cup
Gold medal – first place	2017 Clearwater	Team
World Cup of Softball
Silver medal – second place	2017 Oklahoma City	Team

Baylee Alexis Klingler (born September 20, 1999) is an American professional softball player for the Carolina Blaze of the Athletes Unlimited Softball League (AUSL) and member of the United States women's national softball team. She previously played for the Sultanes de Monterrey of the Mexican Softball League. She played college softball at Washington. As a senior in 2022, she won the Pac-12 Conference Triple Crown.

== High school career ==
Klingler attended Dickinson High School in Dickinson, Texas. During her career she posted a .569 batting average and .638 OBP with 31 home runs, 18 triples, 41 doubles and 144 RBI. She was a four-time First-Team All District and four-time First-Team All Galveston County honoree. During her junior and senior year, she was a member of the All-State team. She was also named an Under Armor All-American, MaxPreps All-American and FloSoftball All-American. She was a two-time Galveston County Female Athlete of the Year finalist, Galveston County softball co-player of the year and 2018 Galveston Offensive MVP. She was ranked as the No. 4 recruit in the 2018 class by FloSoftball and No. 5 by Extra Inning Softball.

== College career ==
Klingler began her collegiate career for the Texas A&M Aggies in 2019. During her first year in conference play she led the team in home runs (5), RBI (16) and slugging (.493), ranked second in batting average (.280) and third in on-base percentage (.325). She started all 55 games and finished the season with a .296 average, five home runs and 28 RBI. Following the season she was named to the SEC All-Freshman Team.

On June 18, 2019, Klingler announced she was transferring to Washington. During her second year in 2020, in 25 games she hit .481, with 37 hits, eight doubles, five home runs, and 33 RBI in a season that was shortened due to the COVID-19 pandemic. In five games, she had 11 hits, four runs, two home runs, and eight RBI with a .733 average and .688 OBP. She matched her career high with a four-hit game against Fullerton and has had multiple hits in four consecutive games. She was subsequently named the Pac-12 Player of the Week for the week ending March 3, 2020.

During her junior year in 2021, she hit .416, with a .507 OBP, 72 hits, 17 doubles, 16 home runs, 53 RBI and 56 runs. She led the Pac-12 in runs scored, doubles and extra-base hits, and ranked second in RBI. She was one of three Pac-12 players with a batting average over .400 and one of two players with an on-base percentage over .500. She became the first Husky since Ali Aguilar in 2017 with 50 runs and 50 RBI in the same year. Following the season she was named to the first-team All-Pac-12 and named a second-team All-American.

During her senior year in 2022, she led the conference in batting average (.434), slugging percentage (1.007), home runs (24), RBI (71) and total bases (149). She became the third Pac-12 Triple Crown winner in history after Jenny Dalton (1996) and Stacey Nuveman (1999). Her 24 home runs were the second most in a single-season in program history, trailing Kristen Rivera's record of 25. Following an outstanding season, she was named Pac-12 Conference Softball Player of the Year, first-team all-Pac-12 and named a unanimous first-team All-American. She was also named a top-three finalist for the USA Softball Collegiate Player of the Year.

== Professional career ==
On April 17, 2023, Klingler was drafted second overall by the Texas Smoke in the 2023 Women's Professional Fastpitch draft.

In January 2025, Klinger joined the Sultanes de Monterrey of the Mexican Softball League. She led the league in RBI with 32.

On January 29, 2025, Klingler was drafted in the eighth round, 31st overall, by the Blaze in the inaugural Athletes Unlimited Softball League draft.

== International career ==
Klingler represented the United States at the 2017 World Cup of Softball where she hit .500, with two runs scored, six RBI and a home run and won a silver medal. She also represented the United States at the 2017 Junior Women's Softball World Championship. During the tournament she hit .393 with 10 runs scored, two home runs, and 12 RBI, and won a gold medal.

On August 31, 2023, Klingler was named to the United States women's national softball team for the 2023 Pan American Games.

== Personal life ==
Klingler is the daughter of former American football player Jimmy Klingler. Her brother, Cory, played college football at Rice, while her sister, Courtney, played college softball at Houston. Her uncle, David Klingler, was also a former football player.
