= Premier Girls Fastpitch =

Travel softball association

- Formation: 2009
- Headquarters: Huntington Beach, California
- Leader: Dan Hay
- Website: http://www.premiergirlsfastpitch.com

Premier Girls Fastpitch (PGF) is a national travel softball association. Teams compete in local, state, regional, and national tournaments. The national tournament is held every year in Huntington Beach, California, and consists of Premier and Platinum divisions.

== History ==
Premier Girls Fastpitch was founded in 2009 by Gary Haning and Dan Hay in Huntington Beach, California. The premise of the organization was to compete with the Amateur Softball Association by having teams qualify for regional events as well as the National Championships, ultimately creating better competition for larger events.

== Divisions ==
At the national level, Premier Girls Fastpitch has two primary divisions: Premier and Platinum. The Premier Division is for top-level competition. Teams that enter the Premier division can expect to play against the best teams in the tournament. The Platinum Division is considered a stepping stone into the Premier Division. Teams wishing to improve that are not yet ready for Premier tend to enter the Platinum division. A third division, Regional, exists for teams that do not wish to play at the national level. The Regional division does not have sub-divisions, and instead, all teams are pooled together.

== PGF Premier National Championship Winners (2013-2021) ==
Year	Team	Location	Head Coach
2013	So Cal Athletics	CA	Bruce Richardson
2014	OC Batbusters-Haning	CA	Mike Stith
2015	Firecrackers-Pasco/Guerra	CA	Ben Pasco
2016	Firecrackers Rico	CA	Tony Rico
2017	Salinas Storm Heen	CA	Marc Kaiser
2018	Firecrackers North Thomas	CA	Michael Thomas
2019	Athletics Mercado/Smith	CA	Dave Mercado
No tournament due to the coronavirus pandemic
2021	Nebraska Gold	NE	Beth Singleton
