= Karlyn Pickens =

American softball player (born 2004)

Carolina Blaze – No. 23
- Pitcher
- Born: January 9, 2004 (age 22); Weaverville, North Carolina, U.S.

Teams
- Tennessee (2023–2026); Carolina Blaze (2026–present)

Career highlights and awards
- Softball America Pitcher of the Year (2025); WCWS All-Tournament Team (2025); 2× SEC Pitcher of the Year (2024, 2025); SEC Freshman of the Year (2023); 3× First team All-American (2024–2026); 3× All-SEC First team (2024–2026); All-SEC Second team (2023); All-SEC Defensive Team (2026)

Karlyn Nicole Pickens (born January 9, 2004) is an American professional softball pitcher for the Carolina Blaze of the Athletes Unlimited Softball League (AUSL). She played college softball at Tennessee and holds the NCAA Division I record for fastest pitch ever thrown at 79.4 miles per hour (127.8 km/h).

== High school career ==
Pickens attended North Buncombe High School in Weaverville, North Carolina where she was a three-sport athlete, playing softball, basketball and volleyball. During the 2021 season, in her junior year, she posted a 12–1 record with a 0.41 earned run average (ERA), with 207 strikeouts, and allowed only 12 hits and 21 walks in 85 innings. Following the season she was named North Carolina Gatorade Softball Player of the Year.

She was ranked as the No. 2 pitcher and No. 5 overall player for the class of 2022 by Extra Inning Softball. On November 11, 2021, she signed her national letter of intent to play college softball at Tennessee.

== College career ==
As a freshman during the 2023 season, Pickens appeared in 28 games, with 16 starts, and posted a 9–7 record and two saves, with a 3.05 ERA and 99 strikeouts in 87 1/3 innings. Following the season she was named SEC Freshman of the Year. As a sophomore during the 2024 season, she appeared in 38 games, with 27 starts, and posted a 22–7 record and one save, with a 1.12 ERA, 225 strikeouts, 15 complete games and 12 shutouts in 188 1/3 innings. Following the season she was named SEC Pitcher of the Year and a top-ten finalist for the USA Softball Collegiate Player of the Year.

As a junior during the 2025 season, she appeared in 37 games, with 27 starts, and posted a 22–8 record and three saves, with a 0.90 ERA and 252 strikeouts in 186 1/3 innings. On March 24, 2025, in a game against Arkansas, she set the record for the fastest pitch ever thrown in NCAA softball history at 79.4 miles per hour (127.8 km/h), surpassing the previous record of 77 miles per hour (124 km/h) set by Monica Abbott in 2012. On May 24, 2025, during the Super Regionals of the 2025 NCAA Division I softball tournament against Nebraska, she set a new fastest pitch record at 79.4 miles per hour (127.8 km/h). During conference play she posted an 11–4 with a 1.13 ERA, 113 strikeouts, ten complete games and three shutouts in 93 innings. Following the season she was named SEC Pitcher of the Year for the second consecutive year. She became the fifth pitcher in SEC history to win the award in consecutive seasons, and the seventh in conference history to win the award multiple times. She was also named Softball America Pitcher of the Year, and a top-ten finalist for the USA Softball Collegiate Player of the Year for the second consecutive year.

== Professional career ==
On May 4, 2026, Pickens was drafted first overall by the Carolina Blaze in the 2026 AUSL College Draft. On June 4, 2026, she signed a rookie contract with the Blaze.

== International career ==
On August 3, 2026, she won a gold medal representing the United States at the USA Softball International Cup.

== Personal life ==
Pickens was born to Phillip and Rebecca Pickens, and has two older brothers, Kolton and Rayce.
