= Athletes Unlimited Softball League =

American professional softball league

- Upcoming season or competition: 2026 AUSL season
- Sport: Softball
- First season: 2025
- Commissioner: Kim Ng
- Organising body: Athletes Unlimited
- No. of teams: 6
- Country: United States
- Most recent champion: Utah Talons
- Most titles: Utah Talons (2)
- Broadcaster: ESPN
- Website: theausl.com

The Athletes Unlimited Softball League (AUSL) is a women's professional softball league in the United States, founded in 2024 and run by Athletes Unlimited. The AUSL was announced on June 4, 2024, and the inaugural season began in 2025, with the league playing games in several cities across the United States. In 2026, the league transitioned to a permanent city-based structure for each team. The teams compete in a 30-game regular season along with a postseason championship season. In 2025, Major League Baseball announced its investment in the league and is aiming to establish a long-term professional women's softball league.

== History ==
On June 4, 2024, Athletes Unlimited announced a new softball league, that would feature four teams playing a 30-game season in a traditional format, complementing the existing Athletes Unlimited Pro Softball Championship season. ESPN signed on as a founding broadcast partner. For the inaugural season in 2025 teams did not have home cities but rather toured with games in ten different cities. The average salary for a player will be $40,000–45,000, with salaries up to $75,000 achievable through bonus payments. Lexi Kilfoyl was drafted first overall by the Bandits in the inaugural AUSL draft. Kim Ng was appointed AUSL commissioner on April 16, 2025.

On May 29, 2025, Major League Baseball (MLB) announced a strategic investment in the Athletes Unlimited Softball League to help establish the AUSL as a sustainable organization.

For the upcoming 2026 season, the AUSL has expanded the league from the original four teams to six teams. Each of these six team will now have home fields and cities to play for. The six teams involved in the league will play 25 game regular season. That will be followed the best of 3 finals.

=== Draft ===
After the 2025 AUSL season concluded, on December 1, 2025, the AUSL expansion draft took place. The expansion draft is for the two new teams joining the league to draft players for their teams. The expansion draft started by the four previous teams in the league getting to choose five players they want to keep on their team. These players are called "protected players", and once protected they can not be drafted by expansion teams. The expansion teams then get to draft their players from a group of unprotected players. Each of the new expansion teams will get to draft up to eight players with a minimum of six players for their team.

The next process included the allocation draft. This draft is where all AUSL teams can select any athletes that are not listed on an AUSL team. The last and final draft that will take place is the College draft. This draft will take place in May.

=== Golden Tickets ===
For the AUSL College Draft, each team will get to select up to two college softball players to join their team. Throughout the college softball season softball legends will go and hand out the AUSL Golden Tickets. An AUSL golden ticket serves as an invitation to the upcoming College Draft. If an athlete receives a golden ticket it means that a current AUSL team has selected them to be a part of their team. The team the athlete has been selected by remains unannounced until the College Draft in May, where the team that has drafted the athlete is announced. During the 2026 college softball season there were 17 total golden tickets handed out. On May 4, 2026, the AUSL College Draft took place. This draft determined which team the golden ticket winners will play for.

==== 2026 Golden Ticket Recipients ====
Player	Team	Position
NiJaree Canady (Hold Out)	Texas Tech	Pitcher
Reese Atwood	Texas	Catcher
Leighann Goode	Texas	Infielder
Sydney Stewart	Arizona	Catcher
Karlyn Pickens	Tennessee	Pitcher
Dakota Kennedy	Arkansas	Outfielder
Kenzie Brown	Arizona State	Pitcher
Taryn Kern	Stanford	Infielder
Maya Johnson	Belmont	Pitcher
Jocelyn Erickson	Florida	Catcher
Kenleigh Cahalan	Florida	Infielder
Jordan Woolery	UCLA	Infielder
Taylor Tinsley	UCLA	Pitcher
Megan Grant	UCLA	Utility
Amari Harper	Oregon	Utility
Ailana Agbayani	Oklahoma	Infielder
Peja Goold	Mississippi State	Pitcher

=== Reserve Pools ===
For the remaining seniors that are in college softball they still have the opportunity to be picked up as a provisional pick. A provisional pick is any graduating senior who did not receive a golden ticket. Provisional picks if selected to the reserve pool can be picked up by an AUSL team when needed throughout the season. These athletes can be called upon if AUSL teams have injuries, players have other commitments or for additional flexibility. Once these athletes join a team they can potentially compete to earn a full-time roster spot.

==== 2026 Reserve Pool Athletes ====
Player	Team	Position
Kaiah Altmeyer	Texas	Outfielder
Jordy Frahm	Nebraska	Pitcher
Sydney Berzon	Oklahoma	Pitcher
Elon Butler	Oregon	Utility
Hannah Camenzind	Nebraska	Outfielder
Cassidy Curd	Duke	Pitcher
Abby Dayton	Oklahoma	Pitcher
Isabela Emerling	Oklahoma	Catcher
Sarah Gordon	Georgia	Catcher
Lyndsey Grein	Oregon	Pitcher
Robyn Herron	Arkansas	Pitcher
Grace Jenkins	Arizona	Catcher
Reagan Johnson	Arkansas	Outfielder
Jackie Lis	Texas Tech	Utility
River Mahler	Stanford	Infielder
Ruby Meylan	Oklahoma State	Pitcher
Kennedy Powell	Texas A&M	Infielder
Keirsten Roose	Georgia	Infielder
Kiarra Sells	Mississippi State	Outfielder
Elise Sokolsky	Oregon	Pitcher
Aminah Vega	Duke	Infielder

=== Women's Sports Growth ===
Before the AUSL came about in 2025, the Athlete's Unlimited Pro Softball Championship Series started August 19, 2020. The AU Championship Series brought athletes together to compete on teams that were based upon individual and team points. Which then an individual winner was crowned at the end of the season based upon which athlete had the most cumulative team and individual points. Then in 2022, AU Softball created a shortened version called AUX. AUX was only two weeks long and also crowned an individual winner after the two weeks were completed.

The advancement of AU Pro Softball was able to continue to happen because of the continued growth of engagement that pro softball is having. Which later led to the partnership between the MLB and the AUSL. During the 2025 AUSL softball season teams traveled to different cities to help determine where the permanent host cities would be. The 2025 season had 20 sold-out games. The championship series between the Talons and Bandits had 347,000 views on ESPN. The AUSL website also had 5.3 million views on their website and 240 million impressions on AUSL social media.

The expansion of the AUSL has been one of the biggest additions for the sport of softball. Softball is returning to the Olympics in 2028 for the Los Angeles games. This makes the 2026 AUSL season more prevalent for the pro-players and for the fans of the sport.

== Champions ==
Year	Team	Location	Opponent	Series Score
2025	Utah Talons	Tuscaloosa, AL	Chicago Bandits	2–0
2026	Utah Talons	College Station, TX	Chicago Bandits	2–0

== Teams ==
List of Athletes Unlimited Softball League teams
Team	Location	Stadium	First
Chicago Bandits	Rosemont, Illinois	Parkway Bank Sports Complex	2025
Carolina Blaze	Durham, North Carolina	Smith Family Stadium	2025
Portland Cascade	Hillsboro, Oregon	Hillsboro Ballpark	2026
Oklahoma City Spark	Oklahoma City, Oklahoma	Tom Heath Field	2026
Utah Talons	Salt Lake City, Utah	Dumke Family Stadium	2025
Texas Volts	Round Rock, Texas	Dell Diamond	2025
