= List of Cal State Northridge Matadors softball seasons =

This is a list of Cal State Northridge Matadors softball seasons. The Cal State Northridge Matadors softball program is a college softball team that represents California State University, Northridge in the Big West Conference of the National Collegiate Athletic Association.

The Matadors played in Division II, first as part of the AIAW and then the NCAA. In NCAA Division II, they won four National Championships and placed second two other times before moving up to Division I. Upon reaching the top level, Cal State Northridge reached the Women's College World Series in their third season and finished as national runner-up in their fourth season of 1994. In total at the Division I level, the Matadors have won six conference regular season championships and have appeared in the NCAA Division I softball tournament 13 times.

== Season results ==
National champions	Women's College World Series berth	NCAA Tournament berth	Conference Regular Season Champions

Season	Head coach	Conference	Season results									Tournament results
Season	Head coach	Conference	Overall				Conference					Postseason
Season	Head coach	Conference	Wins	Losses	Ties	%	Wins	Losses	Ties	%	Finish	Postseason
Cal State Northridge Matadors
AIAW
1977	Tony Venditto	SCAA	Records incomplete									—
1978	Tony Venditto	SCAA	4	19	0	.174	Records incomplete					—
1979	Tony Venditto	SCAA	17	14	0	.548	5	7	0	.417	3rd	AIAW Regional
1980	Tony Venditto	SCAA	30	22	0	.577	4	6	0	.400	3rd	AIAW Regional
1981	Tony Venditto	SCAA	32	25	0	.561	9	6	0	.600	5th	WCWS
NCAA Division II
1982	Gary Torgeson	CCAA	34	17	1	.663	12	4	0	.663	1st	WCWS runner-up
1983	Gary Torgeson	CCAA	35	20	2	.632	10	6	0	.625	T-1st	WCWS champions
1984	Gary Torgeson	CCAA	51	12	2	.800	13	3	0	.813	1st	WCWS champions
1985	Gary Torgeson	CCAA	62	19	0	.765	17	3	0	.850	1st	WCWS champions
1986	Gary Torgeson	CCAA	51	12	1	.805	16	4	0	.800	1st	WCWS runner-up
1987	Gary Torgeson	CCAA	58	7	0	.892	18	2	0	.900	1st	WCWS champions
1988	Gary Torgeson	CCAA	53	13	0	.803	18	2	0	.900	1st	WCWS
1989	Gary Torgeson	CCAA	62	19	0	.765	16	4	0	.800	1st	NCAA Regional
1990	Gary Torgeson	CCAA	51	21	0	.708	18	2	0	.900	1st	WCWS runner-up
NCAA Division I	Gary Torgeson											
1991	Gary Torgeson	Independent	34	32	0	.515	N/A					—
1992	Gary Torgeson	Independent	45	25	1	.641	N/A					—
1993	Gary Torgeson	WAC	48	9	1	.836	20	2	0	.909	1st	WCWS
1994	Gary Torgeson	WAC	52	10	0	.839	21	3	0	.875	1st	WCWS runner-up
1995	Janet Sherman	WAC	43	17	0	.717	22	5	0	.815	1st	NCAA Regional
1996	Janet Sherman	WAC	43	16	0	.729	21	7	0	.750	2nd	NCAA Regional
1997	Janet Sherman	Big West	34	22	2	.603	21	11	0	.656	T-2nd	NCAA Regional
1998	Janet Sherman	Big West	37	19	0	.661	22	9	0	.710	1st	NCAA Regional
1999	Janet Sherman	Big West	30	24	0	.556	15	9	0	.625	3rd	NCAA Regional
2000	Janet Sherman	Big West	26	26	1	.500	16	8	0	.667	3rd	NCAA Regional
2001	Janet Sherman	Big West	32	24	0	.571	15	6	0	.714	3rd	NCAA Regional
2002	Barbara Jordan	Big West	27	24	0	.529	12	12	0	.500	T-4th	—
2003	Barbara Jordan	Big West	27	23	0	.540	12	8	0	.600	3rd	NCAA Regional
2004	Barbara Jordan	Big West	35	19	0	.648	14	7	0	.667	T-2nd	NCAA Regional
2005	Barbara Jordan	Big West	16	23	0	.410	5	16	0	.238	7th	—
2006	Barbara Jordan	Big West	22	20	.524	8	10	0	.444	T-4th	—	
2007	Barbara Jordan	Big West	23	23	1	.500	9	9	0	.500	4th	NCAA Regional
2008	Barbara Jordan	Big West	23	24	0	.489	12	9	0	.571	T-3rd	—
2009	Barbara Jordan	Big West	29	21	0	.580	9	12	0	.429	T-4th	—
2010	Roni Sperrey	Big West	31	22	0	.585	15	6	0	.714	T-1st	—
2011	Tairia Flowers	Big West	22	31	0	.415	10	11	0	.476	5th	—
2012	Tairia Flowers	Big West	10	42	0	.192	5	16	0	.238	T-8th	—
2013	Tairia Flowers	Big West	25	31	0	.446	11	13	0	.458	T-6th	—
2014	Tairia Flowers	Big West	31	26	0	.544	8	13	0	.381	6th	—
2015	Tairia Flowers	Big West	41	27	0	.603	16	5	0	.762	1st	NCAA Regional
2016	Tairia Flowers	Big West	34	22	0	.607	14	7	0	.667	2nd	—
2017	Tairia Flowers	Big West	31	22	0	.585	11	10	0	.524	T-2nd	—
2018	Tairia Flowers	Big West	23	36	0	.390	8	13	0	.381	6th	—
2019	Tairia Flowers	Big West	26	28	0	.481	10	11	0	.476	5th	—
2020	Tairia Flowers	Big West	16	8	0	.667	Season canceled due to COVID-19 pandemic					
2021	Charlotte Morgan	Big West	6	20	0	.231	4	20	0	.167	9th	—
2022	Charlotte Morgan	Big West	24	30	0	.444	14	13	0	.519	T-6th	—
2023	Charlotte Morgan	Big West	28	24	0	.538	19	8	0	.704	3rd	—
2024	Charlotte Morgan	Big West	25	26	0	.490	9	18	0	.333	9th	—
2025	Charlotte Morgan	Big West	26	26	0	.500	17	10	0	.630	2nd	—
2026	Jodie Cox	Big West	14	32	0	.304	9	18	0	.333	7th	—
