= NCAA Division I softball career 200 RBIs list =

There are currently 128 batters and 60 records in the 200 RBIs Club:

Runs Batted In	Batter	School(s)	Years
328	Jenny Dalton	Arizona Wildcats	1993–1996
323	Jocelyn Alo	Oklahoma Sooners	2018–2022
322	Leah Braatz	Arizona Wildcats	1994–1998
315	Laura Espinoza	Arizona Wildcats	1992–1995
314	Tiare Jennings	Oklahoma Sooners	2021–2024
305	Sierra Romero	Michigan Wolverines	2013–2016
299	Stacey Nuveman	UCLA Bruins	1997–2002
293	Stacie Chambers	Arizona Wildcats	2008–2011
288	Christi Orgeron	ULL Ragin’ Cajuns	2009–2012
273	Jessica Warren	FSU Seminoles	2015–2018
270	Kasey Cooper	Auburn Tigers	2014–2017
269	Shelby Pendley	Arizona Wildcats & Oklahoma Sooners	2012–2015
268	Sahvanna Jaquish	LSU Tigers	2014–2017
264	Charlotte Morgan	Alabama Crimson Tide	2007–2010
263	Meghan Gregg	Tennessee Lady Vols	2015–2018
260	Lauren Haeger	Florida Gators	2012–2015
255	Jessie Harper	Arizona Wildcats	2017–2021
255	Katiyana Mauga	Arizona Wildcats	2014–2017
254	Lauren Chamberlain	Oklahoma Sooners	2012–2015
254	Jenna Cone	George Washington Colonials	2017–2021
252	Alyssa DiCarlo	Georgia Bulldogs	2016–2019
248	Mackenzie Vandergeest	Arizona Wildcats	2001–2004
246	Jennifer Gilbert	Ball State Cardinals	2011–2014
246	Danyele Gomez	ULL Ragin’ Cajuns	2003–2006
245	Toni Mascarenas	Arizona Wildcats	1998–2001
245	Linda Rush	Drexel Dragons	2017–2021
244	Kendyl Lindaman	Minnesota Golden Gophers & Florida Gators	2017–2021
243	Jaime Clark	Washington Huskies	2000–2003
241	Tonya Callahan	Tennessee Lady Vols	2005–2008
240	Bailey Hemphill	Alabama Crimson Tide	2017–2021
240	Leticia Pineda	Arizona Wildcats	1995–1998
239	Shannon Beeler	Minnesota Golden Gophers	1996–1999
239	Chelsea Goodacre	Arizona Wildcats	2012–2015
239	Samantha Ricketts	Oklahoma Sooners	2006–2009
237	Morganne Flores	Washington Huskies	2016–2021
236	Bianka Bell	LSU Tigers	2013–2016
236	Katelyn Boyd	Arizona State Sun Devils	2009–2012
236	Alisa Goler	Georgia Bulldogs	2008–2011
235	Jessica Purcell-Fitu	BYU Cougars	2008–2011
233	Kristen Rivera	Washington Huskies	2002–2005
233	Kim Wendland	Georgia Bulldogs	2002–2005
231	Alex Hugo	Kansas Jayhawks & Georgia Bulldogs	2013–2016
231	Amber Jackson	Bethune–Cookman Wildcats & Maryland Terrapins	2003–2007
230	Megan Baltzell	Longwood Lancers	2012–2015
230	Kaitlin Cochran	Arizona State Sun Devils	2006–2009
230	Kristie Fox	Arizona Wildcats	2004–2007
230	Jessica Shults	Oklahoma Sooners	2010–2013
230	Holly Tankersley	ULL Ragin’ Cajuns	2004–2008
229	Brigette Del Ponte	Arizona Wildcats	2010–2013
229	Delaney Spaulding	UCLA Bruins	2014–2017
229	Jenny Topping	Washington Huskies & Cal State Fullerton Titans	1999–2003
228	Tairia Flowers	UCLA Bruins	2000–2003
228	Whitney Haller	Georgia Tech Yellow Jackets	2006–2009
228	Stephany LaRosa	UCLA Bruins	2012–2015
227	Jennifer Cline	Washington Huskies	1993–1996
227	Lexie Elkins	Texas Tech Red Raiders & ULL Ragin’ Cajuns	2013–2016
227	Paige Wilson	Georgia Bulldogs	2012–2015
226	Vicky Galasso	Idaho State Bengals	2012–2015
225	Michelle Church	Washington Huskies	1993–1996
224	Alyssa Palomino-Cardoza	Arizona Wildcats	2017–2021
223	Gabriele Bridges	ULL Ragin’ Cajuns	2008–2011
222	Reese Atwood	Texas Longhorns	2023–2025
221	Alana Addison	ULL Ragin’ Cajuns	1999–2002
221	Francesca Enea	Florida Gators	2007–2010
220	Amber Bishop	Liberty Flames	2017–2021
220	Tiffany Huff	Tennessee Lady Vols	2007–2010
219	Samantha Findlay	Michigan Wolverines	2005–2008
219	Tori Vidales	Texas A&M Aggies	2015–2018
218	Nina Lindenberg	Long Beach State 49ers & Fresno State Bulldogs	1995–1998
218	Hayley Norton	Saint Francis Red Flash	2016–2019
218	DJ Sanders	ULL Ragin’ Cajuns & Oregon Ducks	2015–2018
217	Megan Bush	Florida Gators	2008–2011
217	Michelle Fuzzard	Chattanooga Mocs	2008–2012
217	Shellie Landry	ULL Ragin’ Cajuns	2013–2016
217	Morgan Noad	Coastal Carolina Chanticleers	2013–2016
216	Emily Carosone	Auburn Tigers	2013–2016
216	Lauren Gibson	Tennessee Lady Vols	2010–2013
216	Maddie O'Brien	FSU Seminoles	2012–2015
216	Sara Pickering	Washington Huskies	1994–1997
215	Ivie Drake	Georgia State Panthers	2015–2018
215	Bri Ellis	Auburn Tigers & Arkansas Razorbacks	2022–2025
214	Haley Hayden	ULL Ragin’ Cajuns	2014–2017
214	Kaila Hunt	Alabama Crimson Tide	2011–2014
214	Tina Iosefa	Georgia Bulldogs	2013–2016
214	Samantha Iuli	UIC Flames	1997–2000
214	Heather Johnson	Notre Dame Fighting Irish	2008–2011
214	Jenna Rich	Stanford Cardinal	2010–2013
214	Sydney Romero	Oklahoma Sooners	2016–2019
213	Stephanie Best	UCF Knights	2002–2005
213	Ali Viola	Nebraska Cornhuskers	1995–1998
212	Erika Piancastelli	McNeese State Cowgirls	2015–2018
212	Amanda Scott	Fresno State Bulldogs	1997–2000
211	Melissa Chmielewski	North Dakota State Bison	2007–2010
211	Jana Mower	ULL Ragin’ Cajuns	1998–2001
211	Libby Sugg	BYU Cougars	2016–2019
210	Kelsey Horton	New Mexico State Aggies	2016–2019
209	Ianeta Le'i	BYU Cougars	2003–2006
209	Hoku Nohara	New Mexico State Aggies	2008–2011
209	Hayley Steele	Arizona State Sun Devils	2012–2015
208	Ali Aguilar	Washington Huskies	2014–2017
208	Branndi Melero	Auburn Tigers	2012–2015
207	Garland Cooper	Northwestern Wildcats	2004–2007
207	Madison Shipman	Tennessee Lady Vols	2011–2014
206	Stephanie Pasquale	Temple Owls & Nebraska Cornhuskers	2011–2015
205	Cheyenne Coyle	Florida Gators & Arizona State Sun Devils	2011–2014
204	Kristen Brown	North Carolina Tar Heels	2013–2016
203	Tera Blanco	Michigan Wolverines	2015–2018
203	Tiffany Clark	ULL Ragin’ Cajuns	1997–2000
203	Kristi Durant	Tennessee Lady Vols	2003–2006
203	Taylor Edwards	Nebraska Cornhuskers	2011–2014
203	Lovieanne Jung	Fresno State Bulldogs & Arizona Wildcats	1999–2003
203	Julie Marshall	UCLA Bruins	1996–2000
203	Dejah Mulipola	Arizona Wildcats	2017–2021
203	Madi Sue Montgomery	Oklahoma State Cowgirls	2016–2019
203	Megan Wiggins	Georgia Bulldogs	2008–2011
202	Tamra Howren	Troy Trojans	2002–2005
202	Rachel McCollum	Campbell Fighting Camels & East Carolina Pirates	2016–2021
201	Suzy Brookshire	Sacramento State Hornets, San Jose State Spartans & Long Beach State 49ers	2017–2021
201	Sarah Beeson	Stanford Cardinal	1999–2002
201	Sierra Lawrence	Michigan Wolverines	2013–2016
201	Angeline Quiocho	BYU Cougars	2007–2010
201	Kelsi Weseman	Georgia Tech Yellow Jackets	2009–2012
200	Lorena Bauer	San Diego State Aztecs	2011–2015
200	Abbey Cheek	Kentucky Wildcats	2016–2019
200	Amanda Chidester	Michigan Wolverines	2009–2012
200	Kate Gordon	James Madison Dukes	2017–2021
200	Andrea Migliori	Stetson Hatters	2006–2009

== Progression ==
Jenny Dalton drove in her 316th career RBI on a grand slam home run against Shawn Starling of Troy Trojans on May 17, 1996; Dalton surpassed former teammate Laura Espinoza for the record.

Leah Braatz became the third batter to collect 300 RBIs for a career in Pac-10 play of 1998. Sierra Romero drove in her career 300th RBI on May 20, 2016, to join the three others from Arizona who reached the career benchmark, all in the 1990s.

== Base on Balls ==
In addition, there are currently 30 hitters in the 200 RBIs club that have amassed at least 150 walks in their career:

Stacey Nuveman – 240; Bailey Hemphill - 237; Kaitlin Cochran – 235; Erika Piancastelli - 229; Sierra Romero – 226; Kendyl Lindaman - 215; Kasey Cooper – 212; Lauren Chamberlain – 207; Jenny Topping – 200; Maddie O'Brien – 197; Alissa Goler – 184; Jocelyn Alo - 183; Kristen Rivera – 180;Jenny Dalton – 178; Ivie Drake - 177; Jennifer Cline – 175; Lauren Haeger – 175; Leah Braatz – 173; Cheyenne Coyle – 171; Katelyn Boyd – 167; Megan Baltzell – 166; Sahvanna Jaquish – 165; Tori Vidales - 164; Katiyana Mauga – 158; Stacie Chambers – 158; Samantha Findlay – 157; Holly Tankersley – 156; Tonya Callahan – 154; Alex Hugo – 153; Tiffany Huff – 152; Taylor Edwards – 150.

== Records & Milestones ==
Laura Espinoza set the NCAA record by driving in 128 RBIs in 1995; Nina Lindenberg tallied the fewest RBIs in a non-injury season with 17 the same year. Christi Orgeron claims the junior class record with 101 RBIs in 2011. Leticia Pineda, as a sophomore in 1996, drove in 96 RBIs for that class record. Along with Espinoza in 1995 and Orgeron in 2011, Jenny Dalton drove in 109 in 1996 and Leah Braatz 100 in 1998, are the only players to reach the 100 benchmark. Stephanie Best tied the record for single game RBIs by driving in 11 on March 9, 2003. Espinoza simultaneously set the season home run mark in 1995 with 37. Finally in 1996, Lindenberg also hit an NCAA record 29 doubles and drove in 60 RBIs.

Along with Espinoza in 1995 & (95 in 1994), Orgeron in 2011 & (94 in 2012), Pineda in 1996, Topping in 2000, Dalton in 1996 (98 in 1995 & 91 in 1994), Braatz in 1998, Stacie Chambers (96 in 2009), Stacey Nuveman (91 in 1999) and Angeline Quiocho (90 in 2010) all rank top-10 for RBIs in an NCAA season. Also with Espinoza in 1994 & 1995, Dalton in 1996, Braatz (78 in 1997) & 1998, Nuveman in 1999, Topping in 2000, Chambers in 2009, Quiocho in 2010, Orgeron in 2011 & 2012, Toni Mascarenas (84 in 2001), Jaime Clark (75 in 2002), Lovieanne Jung (79 in 2003), Samantha Findlay (77 in 2005), Ianeta Le'i (82 in 2006), Samantha Ricketts (81 in 2007), Charlotte Morgan (79 in 2008), Lauren Chamberlain (84 in 2013), Maddie O'Brien (83 in 2014), Chelsea Goodacre (86 in 2015), Tina Iosefa (87 in 2016), DJ Sanders (82 in 2017) and Hemphill (84 in 2019) led the NCAA in RBIs for those seasons.

Finally, Espinoza (48 in 1993) & 1994, Pineda in 1996 & (56 in 1997), Dalton (30 in 1993) 1994 & 1996, Braatz (75 in 1993) & 1997, Nuveman in 1999, Mascarenas in 2001, Findlay in 2005, Chamberlain in 2013, Lindenberg (77 in 1998), Amanda Scott (72 in 1998), Julie Marshall (67 in 1999), Mackenzie Vandergeest (61 in 2001), Tairia Flowers (70 in 2003), Kristie Fox (66 in 2006 & 63 in 2007), Kaitlin Cochran (51 in 2008), Katelyn Boyd (66 in 2011), Kalia Hunt (77 in 2012), Shelby Pendley (73 in 2013), Jessica Shults (45 in 2013), Lauren Haeger (67 in 2014 & 71 in 2015), Sydney Romero (39 in 2016 and 59 in 2017), Jessica Warren (70 in 2018) and Jocelyn Alo (89 in 2021) all won national championships those years. For their careers, Dalton (Pac-12), Sierra Romero (Big Ten), Orgeron (Sun Belt), Warren (ACC), Kasey Cooper (SEC), Chamberlain (Big 12), Jenna Cone (A-10), Jennifer Gilbert (MAC), Linda Rush (CAA), Jessica Purcell-Fitu (MWC), Vicky Galasso (Big Sky), Hayley Norton (NEC), Michelle Fuzzard (Southern), Samantha Iuli (Horizon), Morgan Noad (Big South), Best (A-Sun), Erika Piancastelli (Southland), Scott (WAC), Michelle Chmielewski (Summit), and Libby Sugg (WCC) hold the RBI crowns for those conferences.

== Links ==
- NCAA Division I softball career .400 batting average list
- NCAA Division I softball career 50 home runs list
