= 1994 UCLA Bruins softball team =

American college softball season

1994 UCLA Bruins softball

NCAA Regional No. 2 champion

Women's College World Series, 2–2
- Conference: Pacific-10 Conference
- Record: 43–14 (16–6 Pac-10)
- Head coach: Sharron Backus (20th season) & Sue Enquist (6th season)
- Home stadium: Easton Stadium

1994 Pacific-10 Conference softball standings
	Conf.				Overall
Team	W		L	PCT	W		L	PCT
Arizona ‍†‍‍^{y}	23	–	1	.958	64	–	3	.955
UCLA ‍‍‍^{y}	16	–	6	.727	43	–	14	.754
Washington ‍‍‍^{y}	14	–	10	.583	43	–	19	.694
Oregon ‍‍‍^{y}	12	–	12	.500	38	–	22	.633
California ‍‍‍^{y}	10	–	12	.455	40	–	21	.656
Arizona State ‍‍‍	7	–	17	.292	22	–	41	.349
Oregon State ‍‍‍	0	–	24	.000	16	–	41	.281
† – Conference champion y – Invited to the NCAA tournament

The 1994 UCLA Bruins softball team represented the University of California, Los Angeles in the 1994 NCAA Division I softball season. The Bruins were coached by Sharron Backus, who led her twentieth season and Sue Enquist, in her sixth season, in an uncommonly used co-head coach system. The Bruins played their home games at the brand new Easton Stadium and finished with a record of 43–14. They competed in the Pacific-10 Conference, where they finished second with a 16–6 record.

The Bruins were invited to the 1994 NCAA Division I softball tournament, where they won the Regional to advance to the Women's College World Series. They finished in fourth place with wins against UIC and Utah and losses to Fresno State and eventual champion Arizona.

== Personnel ==
=== Roster ===
1994 UCLA Bruins roster
Pitchers: 5 - DeeDee Weiman - Senior; 10 - B'Ann Burns - Freshman; 32 - Jennifer Brundage - Junior; Catchers: 9 - Cindy Valero - Junior; 15 - Joanne Alchin - Junior	Infielders: 1 - Nicole Odom - Freshman; 7 - Kari Robinette - Freshman; 8 - Kelly Howard - Sophomore; 14 - Alleah Poulson - Freshman; 17 - Nichole Victoria - Senior; Utility: 12 - Janae Deffenbaugh - Senior	Outfielders: 2 - Felicia Cruz - Junior; 3 - Stephanie Carew - Freshman; 11 - Ginny Mike-Mitchell - Sophomore; 13 - Jennifer Brewster - Junior; 19 - Becky Toler - Junior; 22 - Kathi Evans - Junior

=== Coaches ===
1994 UCLA Bruins softball coaching staff
- Sharron Backus - co-Head coach - 20th season
- Sue Enquist - co-Head coach - 6th season
- Kirk Walker - Assistant Coach - 5th season
- Kelly Inouye - Assistant Coach - 1st season

== Schedule ==
Legend
	UCLA win
	UCLA loss
*	Non-Conference game

1994 UCLA Bruins softball game log
Regular season

February
Date	Opponent	Site/stadium	Score	Overall record	Pac-10 record
Feb 12	at Arizona State	Sun Devil Club Stadium • Tempe, AZ	L 1–2	0–1	0–1
Feb 12	at Arizona State	Sun Devil Club Stadium • Tempe, AZ	W 4–3	1–1	1–1
Feb 15	at UC Santa Barbara*	Campus Diamond • Santa Barbara, CA	W 6–0	2–1	
Feb 15	at UC Santa Barbara*	Campus Diamond • Santa Barbara, CA	W 6–2	3–1	
Feb 25	at UNLV*	Rebel Softball Diamond • Paradise, NV (UNLV Spring Fling)	W 5–0	4–1	
Feb 25	vs South Carolina*	Rebel Softball Diamond • Paradise, NV (UNLV Spring Fling)	W 10–2^{6}	5–1	
Feb 26	vs Sacramento State*	Rebel Softball Diamond • Paradise, NV (UNLV Spring Fling)	W 2–0	6–1	
Feb 27	vs Hawaii*	Rebel Softball Diamond • Paradise, NV (UNLV Spring Fling)	L 0–1	6–2	
Feb 27	vs South Carolina*	Rebel Softball Diamond • Paradise, NV (UNLV Spring Fling)	W 8–1	7–2	

March
Date	Opponent	Site/stadium	Score	Overall record	Pac-10 record
Mar 4	California	Easton Stadium • Los Angeles, CA	W 2–0	8–2	2–1
Mar 4	California	Easton Stadium • Los Angeles, CA	W 7–5	9–2	3–1
Mar 10	at South Florida*	Tampa, FL (USF Softball Classic)	W 10–0^{5}	10–2	
Mar 11	vs Penn State*	Tampa, FL (USF Softball Classic)	W 6–0	11–2	
Mar 11	vs Notre Dame*	Tampa, FL (USF Softball Classic)	W 12–0^{5}	12–2	
Mar 11	vs UIC*	Tampa, FL (USF Softball Classic)	W 2–0	13–2	
Mar 12	vs Florida State*	Tampa, FL (USF Softball Classic)	W 3–0	14–2	
Mar 12	vs Robert Morris*	Tampa, FL (USF Softball Classic)	W 6–2	15–2	
Mar 13	vs South Carolina*	Tampa, FL (USF Softball Classic)	W 5–0	16–2	
Mar 13	vs Oklahoma*	Tampa, FL (USF Softball Classic)	W 3–0	17–2	
Mar 13	vs Oklahoma State*	Tampa, FL (USF Softball Classic)	L 2–8	17–3	
Mar 16	at Long Beach State*	LBSU Softball Complex • Long Beach, CA	W 4–0	18–3	
Mar 16	at Long Beach State*	LBSU Softball Complex • Long Beach, CA	W 4–1	19–3	
Mar 20	Oregon State	Easton Stadium • Los Angeles, CA	W 9–2	20–3	4–1
Mar 20	Oregon State	Easton Stadium • Los Angeles, CA	W 2–0	21–3	5–1
Mar 28	Washington	Easton Stadium • Los Angeles, CA	W 3–1	22–3	6–1
Mar 28	Washington	Easton Stadium • Los Angeles, CA	W 6–3	23–3	7–1
Mar 29	Oregon	Easton Stadium • Los Angeles, CA	W 1–0	24–3	8–1
Mar 29	Oregon	Easton Stadium • Los Angeles, CA	W 2–1	25–3	9–1

April
Date	Opponent	Site/stadium	Score	Overall record	Pac-10 record
Apr 2	at Arizona	Rita Hillenbrand Memorial Stadium • Tucson, AZ	L 2–11	25–4	9–2
Apr 2	at Arizona	Rita Hillenbrand Memorial Stadium • Tucson, AZ	L 1–7	25–5	9–3
Apr 6	at Cal State Northridge*	Matador Diamond • Northridge, CA	L 1–2	25–6	
Apr 6	at Cal State Northridge*	Matador Diamond • Northridge, CA	L 1–6	25–7	
Apr 9	Arizona State	Easton Stadium • Los Angeles, CA	W 3–0	26–7	10–3
Apr 9	Arizona State	Easton Stadium • Los Angeles, CA	W 10–1	27–7	11–3
Apr 12	Fresno State*	Easton Stadium • Los Angeles, CA	L 2–6	27–8	
Apr 12	Fresno State*	Easton Stadium • Los Angeles, CA	W 5–2	28–8	
Apr 16	at Washington	Husky Softball Stadium • Seattle, WA	W 4–1	29–8	12–3
Apr 16	at Washington	Husky Softball Stadium • Seattle, WA	W 6–1^{8}	30–8	13–3
Apr 21	San Jose State*	Easton Stadium • Los Angeles, CA	W 9–1^{5}	31–8	
Apr 21	San Jose State*	Easton Stadium • Los Angeles, CA	W 6–0	32–8	
Apr 30	Arizona	Easton Stadium • Los Angeles, CA	L 1–3^{12}	32–9	13–4
Apr 30	Arizona	Easton Stadium • Los Angeles, CA	L 2–4	32–10	13–5

May
Date	Opponent	Site/stadium	Score	Overall record	Pac-10 record
May 7	Santa Clara*	Easton Stadium • Los Angeles, CA	W 8–0^{5}	33–10	
May 7	Santa Clara*	Easton Stadium • Los Angeles, CA	W 7–0	34–10	
May 10	at Oregon State	Corvallis, OR	W 7–0	35–10	14–5
May 10	at Oregon State	Corvallis, OR	W 5–0	36–10	15–5
May 11	at Oregon	Howe Field • Eugene, OR	L 2–3	36–11	15–6
May 11	at Oregon	Howe Field • Eugene, OR	W 2–1	37–11	16–6

Postseason

NCAA Regional No. 2
Date	Opponent	Site/stadium	Score	Overall record	NCAAT record
May 20	Georgia State	Lady Gamecock Field • Columbia, SC	W 2–1	38–11	1–0
May 21	UNLV	Lady Gamecock Field • Columbia, SC	L 0–1^{9}	38–12	1–1
May 21	South Carolina	Lady Gamecock Field • Columbia, SC	W 3–1	39–12	2–1
May 22	UNLV	Lady Gamecock Field • Columbia, SC	W 2–1^{8}	40–12	3–1
May 22	UNLV	Lady Gamecock Field • Columbia, SC	W 3–2	41–12	4–1

NCAA Women's College World Series
Date	Opponent	Seed	Site/stadium	Score	Overall record	WCWS Record
May 26	(5) Fresno State	(4)	ASA Hall of Fame Stadium • Oklahoma City, OK	L 0–1	41–13	0–1
May 28	(8) UIC	(4)	ASA Hall of Fame Stadium • Oklahoma City, OK	W 9–0^{5}	42–13	1–1
May 28	(6) Utah	(4)	ASA Hall of Fame Stadium • Oklahoma City, OK	W 11–1	43–13	2–1
May 29	(1) Arizona	(4)	ASA Hall of Fame Stadium • Oklahoma City, OK	L 2–5	43–14	2–2
