= 1994 NCAA Division I softball season =

American college softball season

- Defending Champions: Arizona

Tournament

Women's College World Series
- Duration: May 26–30, 1994
- Champions: Arizona (3rd title)
- Runners-up: Cal State Northridge (2nd WCWS Appearance)
- Winning Coach: Mike Candrea (3rd title)

Seasons
- ← 1993 1995 →

The 1994 NCAA Division I softball season, play of college softball in the United States organized by the National Collegiate Athletic Association (NCAA) at the Division I level, began in February 1994. The season progressed through the regular season, many conference tournaments and championship series, and concluded with the 1994 NCAA Division I softball tournament and 1994 Women's College World Series. The Women's College World Series, consisting of the eight remaining teams in the NCAA Tournament and held in Oklahoma City at ASA Hall of Fame Stadium, ended on May 30, 1994.

== Conference standings ==
1994 Big Ten Conference softball standings
	Conf.						Overall
Team	W		L		T	PCT	W		L		T	PCT
Indiana ‍†‍‍^{y}	23	–	5	–	0	.821	49	–	16	–	0	.754
Iowa ‍‍‍	20	–	8	–	0	.714	35	–	23	–	0	.603
Ohio State ‍‍‍	18	–	10	–	0	.643	40	–	20	–	0	.667
Michigan ‍‍‍	18	–	10	–	0	.643	34	–	26	–	0	.567
Northwestern ‍‍‍	17	–	11	–	0	.607	35	–	21	–	0	.625
Michigan State ‍‍‍	6	–	22	–	0	.214	19	–	38	–	0	.333
Penn State ‍‍‍	6	–	22	–	0	.214	10	–	40	–	0	.200
Minnesota ‍‍‍	4	–	24	–	0	.143	19	–	42	–	0	.311
† – Conference champion y – Invited to the NCAA tournament

1994 Pacific-10 Conference softball standings
	Conf.				Overall
Team	W		L	PCT	W		L	PCT
Arizona ‍†‍‍^{y}	23	–	1	.958	64	–	3	.955
UCLA ‍‍‍^{y}	16	–	6	.727	43	–	14	.754
Washington ‍‍‍^{y}	14	–	10	.583	43	–	19	.694
Oregon ‍‍‍^{y}	12	–	12	.500	38	–	22	.633
California ‍‍‍^{y}	10	–	12	.455	40	–	21	.656
Arizona State ‍‍‍	7	–	17	.292	22	–	41	.349
Oregon State ‍‍‍	0	–	24	.000	16	–	41	.281
† – Conference champion y – Invited to the NCAA tournament

1994 Southland Conference softball standings
	Conf.						Overall
Team	W		L		T	PCT	W		L		T	PCT
McNeese State* ‍†‍‍^{y}	22	–	7	–	1	.750	35	–	24	–	2	.590
Nicholls State* ‍‍‍	21	–	7	–	0	.750	52	–	17	–	0	.754
Northeast Louisiana ‍‍‍	20	–	10	–	0	.667	31	–	29	–	0	.517
Texas–San Antonio ‍‍‍	20	–	12	–	0	.625	31	–	21	–	0	.596
Stephen F. Austin ‍‍‍	15	–	15	–	0	.500	31	–	31	–	0	.500
Sam Houston State ‍‍‍	13	–	18	–	1	.422	18	–	35	–	1	.343
Texas–Arlington ‍‍‍	11	–	19	–	0	.367	17	–	37	–	0	.315
Northwestern Louisiana ‍‍‍	9	–	23	–	0	.281	17	–	42	–	0	.288
Southwest Texas State ‍‍‍	6	–	26	–	0	.188	11	–	42	–	1	.213
† – Conference champion y – Invited to the NCAA tournament * McNeese won conference regular season championship winning a 3 game tie breaker 2-1. - No conference tournament

1994 Western Athletic Conference softball standings
	Conf.						Overall
Team	W		L		T	PCT	W		L		T	PCT
Cal State Northridge ‍†‍‍^{y}	21	–	3	–	0	.875	52	–	10	–	0	.839
Utah ‍‍‍^{y}	22	–	4	–	0	.846	51	–	13	–	0	.797
Fresno State ‍‍‍^{y}	21	–	5	–	0	.808	49	–	16	–	0	.754
New Mexico ‍‍‍	11	–	15	–	0	.423	26	–	22	–	0	.542
Sacramento State ‍‍‍	11	–	16	–	1	.411	25	–	30	–	1	.455
Colorado State ‍‍‍	9	–	16	–	0	.360	22	–	30	–	1	.425
San Diego State ‍‍‍	4	–	19	–	1	.188	21	–	29	–	1	.422
Southern Utah ‍‍‍	1	–	22	–	0	.043	6	–	42	–	0	.125
† – Conference champion y – Invited to the NCAA tournament

== Women's College World Series ==
The 1994 NCAA Women's College World Series took place from May 26 to May 30, 1994 in Oklahoma City.

First round
1	Arizona	8
8	UIC	0 ^{5}
4	UCLA	0
5	Fresno State	1
8	UIC	0 ^{5}
4	UCLA	9
3	Oklahoma State	0 ^{8}
6	Utah	2
7	Missouri	3
2	Cal State Northridge	5
3	Oklahoma State	7
7	Missouri	3

Second round
1	Arizona	3
5	Fresno State	0
4	UCLA	11
6	Utah	1
6	Utah	1
2	Cal State Northridge	5
3	Oklahoma State	2
5	Fresno State	0

Semifinals
1	Arizona	5	—
4	UCLA	2	—
2	Cal State Northridge	2 ^{15}	4
3	Oklahoma State	3	2

Finals
1	Arizona	4
2	Cal State Northridge	0

== Season leaders ==
Batting

- Batting average: .588 – Sara Graziano, Coastal Carolina Chanticleers
- RBIs: 95 – Laura Espinoza, Arizona Wildcats
- Home runs: 30 – Laura Espinoza, Arizona Wildcats

Pitching

- Wins: 36-11 – Maureen Brady, Fresno State Bulldogs
- ERA: 0.36 (10 ER/194.0 IP) – Amy Windmiller, Cal State Northridge Matadors
- Strikeouts: 359 – DeeDee Weiman, UCLA Bruins

== Records ==
NCAA Division I season batting average: .588 – Sara Graziano, Coastal Carolina Chanticleers

NCAA Division I season SEASON stolen bases: 80 – Michelle Ward, East Carolina Pirates

NCAA Division I season of perfect stolen bases: 48-48 – Angel McNamara, Morgan State Bears

NCAA Division I season complete games: 62 – Jessica Accord, Santa Clara Broncos

Junior class 7 inning single game strikeouts: 19 – Michelle Collins, Virginia Cavaliers; April 5, 1994

Sophomore class perfect games: 4 – Terri Kobata, Notre Dame Fighting Irish & Audrey West, Boston Terriers

Sophomore class no-hitters: 8 – Terri Kobata, Notre Dame Fighting Irish

Sophomore class season of perfect stolen bases: 33-33 – Cora Williams, Morgan State Bears

Team single game walks: 26 – Austin Peay Governors, February 24, 1994

Team single game stolen bases: 17 – Nicholls Colonels, April 1, 1994

== Awards ==
- Honda Sports Award Softball:

Susie Parra, Arizona Wildcats

YEAR	W	L	GP	GS	CG	SHO	SV	IP	H	R	ER	BB	SO	ERA	WHIP
1994	33	1	35	33	33	14	1	221.1	143	39	33	77	244	1.04	0.99

YEAR	G	AB	R	H	BA	RBI	HR	3B	2B	TB	SLG	BB	SO	SB	SBA
1994	59	158	30	54	.342	38	14	1	8	106	.671%	25	25	0	0

== All America Teams ==
The following players were members of the All-American Teams.

First Team

Position	Player	Class	School
P	Susie Parra	SR.	Arizona Wildcats
P	DeeDee Weiman	SR.	UCLA Bruins
P	Kyla Hall	SR.	ULL Rajin' Cajuns
C	Leah Braatz	FR.	Arizona Wildcats
1B	Amy Chellevold	JR.	Arizona Wildcats
2B	Jenny Dalton	SO.	Arizona Wildcats
3B	Jennifer Brundage	JR.	UCLA Bruins
SS	Laura Espinoza	JR.	Arizona Wildcats
OF	Kathy Morton	JR.	ULL Rajin' Cajuns
OF	Robyn Yorke	FR.	Fresno State Bulldogs
OF	Leah O'Brien	FR.	Arizona Wildcats
DP	Stephanie DeFeo	FR.	ULL Rajin' Cajuns
UT	Kim Ward	JR.	Oklahoma State Cowgirls
AT-L	Amy Windmiller	SR.	CSUN Matadors

Second Team

Position	Player	Class	School
P	Alison Andrus	FR.	Utah Utes
P	Karen Jackson	SR.	Iowa Hawkeyes
P	Brooke Wilkins	FR.	Hawaii Rainbow Wahine
C	Michelle Venturella	JR.	Indiana Hoosiers
1B	Cyndi Parus	JR.	UNLV Rebels
2B	Amy Timmel	SR.	Utah Utes
3B	Lynn Britton	SO.	ULL Rajin' Cajuns
SS	Kim Maher	SR.	Fresno State Bulldogs
OF	Becky Burroughs	SR.	Oklahoma Sooners
OF	Shamalene Wilson	SO.	FSU Seminoles
OF	Jen Fredrickson	SR.	Ohio State Buckeyes
DP	Michelle Bolt	SR.	Fresno State Bulldogs
UT	Krinon Clark	SR.	Ohio State Buckeyes
AT-L	Missy Nowak	JR.	DePaul Blue Demons

Third Team

Position	Player	Class	School
P	Amy Day	SR.	Oklahoma State Cowgirls
P	Terri Kobata	SO.	Notre Dame Fighting Irish
P	Maureen Brady	JR.	Fresno State Bulldogs
C	Eileen Schmidt	SR.	Virginia Cavaliers
1B	Alyson Habetz	SR.	ULL Rajin' Cajuns
2B	Shari Blackman	SR.	Connecticut Huskies
3B	Crystal Boyd	SR.	Hofstra Pride
SS	Shannon Jones	SR.	CSUN Matadors
OF	Laura Berg	SO.	Fresno State Bulldogs
OF	Angie Marzetta	SR.	Washington Huskies
OF	Stacy Thurber	SO.	Princeton Tigers
DP	Meg Montgomery	FR.	Indiana Hoosiers
UT	Tamara Ivie	SR.	CSUN Matadors
AT-L	Gillian Boxx	JR.	California Golden Bears
