= 1994 Arizona Wildcats softball team =

American college softball season

1994 Arizona Wildcats softball

National Champion NCAA Regional champion Pacific-10 Conference champion
- Conference: Pacific-10 Conference
- Record: 64–3 (23–1 Pac-10)
- Head coach: Mike Candrea (9th season)
- Home stadium: Rita Hillenbrand Memorial Stadium

1994 Pacific-10 Conference softball standings
	Conf.				Overall
Team	W		L	PCT	W		L	PCT
Arizona ‍†‍‍^{y}	23	–	1	.958	64	–	3	.955
UCLA ‍‍‍^{y}	16	–	6	.727	43	–	14	.754
Washington ‍‍‍^{y}	14	–	10	.583	43	–	19	.694
Oregon ‍‍‍^{y}	12	–	12	.500	38	–	22	.633
California ‍‍‍^{y}	10	–	12	.455	40	–	21	.656
Arizona State ‍‍‍	7	–	17	.292	22	–	41	.349
Oregon State ‍‍‍	0	–	24	.000	16	–	41	.281
† – Conference champion y – Invited to the NCAA tournament

The 1994 Arizona Wildcats softball team represented the University of Arizona in the 1994 NCAA Division I softball season. The Wildcats were coached by Mike Candrea, who led his ninth season. The Wildcats finished with a record of 64–3. They played their home games at Rita Hillenbrand Memorial Stadium and competed in the Pacific-10 Conference, where they finished first with a 23–1 record.

The Wildcats were invited to the 1994 NCAA Division I softball tournament, where they swept the West Regional and then completed a run through the Women's College World Series to claim their third overall, and second consecutive, NCAA Women's College World Series Championship.

== Roster ==
1994 Arizona Wildcats roster
Pitchers: 1 – Susie Parra – senior; 3 – Carrie Dolan – freshman; 20 - Leah O'Brien – sophomore; 32 – Nancy Evans – freshman; Catchers: 4 – Michelle Martinez – senior; 31 – Leah Braatz – freshman	Infielders: 5 – Susie Duarte – senior; 13 – Amy Chellevold – junior; 16 - Jenny Dalton – sophomore; 30 – Laura Espinoza – junior	Outfielders: 7 – Valerie Zepeda – senior; 8 – Krista Gomez – sophomore; 22 – Andrea Doty – freshman; 26 – Brandi Shiver – freshman

== Schedule ==
Legend
	Arizona win
	Arizona loss
*	Non-Conference game

1994 Arizona Wildcats softball game log
Regular season

February
Date	Opponent	Site/stadium	Score	Overall record	Pac-10 record
Feb 11	Texas A&M*	Rita Hillenbrand Memorial Stadium • Tucson, AZ	W 14–0^{5}	1–0	
Feb 12	New Mexico State*	Rita Hillenbrand Memorial Stadium • Tucson, AZ	W 10–0^{5}	2–0	
Feb 12	Texas A&M*	Rita Hillenbrand Memorial Stadium • Tucson, AZ	W 2–1^{9}	3–0	
Feb 13	Texas A&M*	Rita Hillenbrand Memorial Stadium • Tucson, AZ	W 8–0	4–0	
Feb 13	New Mexico State*	Rita Hillenbrand Memorial Stadium • Tucson, AZ	W 3–0	5–0	
Feb 17	vs Illinois State*	Tempe, AZ	W 4–0	6–0	
Feb 18	vs UNLV*	Tempe, AZ	W 10–1^{5}	7–0	
Feb 18	vs Fresno State*	Tempe, AZ	W 9–8	8–0	
Feb 19	vs Utah State*	Tempe, AZ	W 18–1^{5}	9–0	
Feb 19	vs Utah State*	Tempe, AZ	W 23–1^{5}	10–0	
Feb 25	vs Minnesota*	Albuquerque, NM	W 10–0^{5}	11–0	
Feb 25	vs Minnesota*	Albuquerque, NM	W 9–0^{5}	12–0	
Feb 26	vs Furman*	Albuquerque, NM	W 15–0^{5}	13–0	
Feb 26	vs New Mexico State*	Albuquerque, NM	W 7–0^{5}	14–0	
Feb 27	at New Mexico*	Albuquerque, NM	W 5–1	15–0	
Feb 27	at New Mexico*	Albuquerque, NM	W 7–5	16–0	

March
Date	Opponent	Site/stadium	Score	Overall record	Pac-10 record
Mar 3	Ohio State*	Rita Hillenbrand Memorial Stadium • Tucson, AZ	W 9–3	17–0	
Mar 3	Fresno State*	Rita Hillenbrand Memorial Stadium • Tucson, AZ	W 3–2	18–0	
Mar 4	Washington*	Rita Hillenbrand Memorial Stadium • Tucson, AZ	W 4–2	19–0	
Mar 4	Cal State Fullerton*	Rita Hillenbrand Memorial Stadium • Tucson, AZ	W 7–6	20–0	
Mar 5	Arizona State*	Rita Hillenbrand Memorial Stadium • Tucson, AZ	W 9–1^{6}	21–0	
Mar 6	Cal State Fullerton*	Rita Hillenbrand Memorial Stadium • Tucson, AZ	W 7–6	22–0	
Mar 6	Fresno State*	Rita Hillenbrand Memorial Stadium • Tucson, AZ	W 8–0^{6}	23–0	
Mar 8	Washington	Rita Hillenbrand Memorial Stadium • Tucson, AZ	W 4–3	24–0	1–0
Mar 8	Washington	Rita Hillenbrand Memorial Stadium • Tucson, AZ	W 4–2	25–0	2–0
Mar 11	California	Rita Hillenbrand Memorial Stadium • Tucson, AZ	W 8–0	26–0	3–0
Mar 11	California	Rita Hillenbrand Memorial Stadium • Tucson, AZ	W 5–3	27–0	4–0
Mar 24	vs Utah State*	Titan Softball Complex • Fullerton, CA	W 12–1^{5}	28–0	
Mar 24	vs Kansas*	Titan Softball Complex • Fullerton, CA	W 8–2	29–0	
Mar 25	vs Georgia State*	Titan Softball Complex • Fullerton, CA	W 14–1^{5}	30–0	
Mar 26	vs Minnesota*	Titan Softball Complex • Fullerton, CA	W 5–0	31–0	
Mar 26	vs Fresno State*	Titan Softball Complex • Fullerton, CA	L 1–3	31–1	

April
Date	Opponent	Site/stadium	Score	Overall record	Pac-10 record
Apr 1	Cal State Fullerton*	Rita Hillenbrand Memorial Stadium • Tucson, AZ	W 5–3	32–1	
Apr 1	Cal State Fullerton*	Rita Hillenbrand Memorial Stadium • Tucson, AZ	W 5–2	33–1	
Apr 2	UCLA	Rita Hillenbrand Memorial Stadium • Tucson, AZ	W 11–2	34–1	5–0
Apr 2	UCLA	Rita Hillenbrand Memorial Stadium • Tucson, AZ	W 7–1	35–1	6–0
Apr 6	Arizona State	Rita Hillenbrand Memorial Stadium • Tucson, AZ	W 11–1^{5}	36–1	7–0
Apr 6	Arizona State	Rita Hillenbrand Memorial Stadium • Tucson, AZ	W 12–1^{5}	37–1	8–0
Apr 9	UNLV*	Rita Hillenbrand Memorial Stadium • Tucson, AZ	W 9–1^{5}	38–1	
Apr 9	UNLV*	Rita Hillenbrand Memorial Stadium • Tucson, AZ	L 6–7	38–2	
Apr 10	at California	Berkeley, CA	W 10–1	39–2	9–0
Apr 10	at California	Berkeley, CA	W 4–3	40–2	10–0
Apr 16	Long Beach State*	Rita Hillenbrand Memorial Stadium • Tucson, AZ	W 7–0	41–2	
Apr 16	Long Beach State*	Rita Hillenbrand Memorial Stadium • Tucson, AZ	W 9–1^{6}	42–2	
Apr 20	at Arizona State	Tempe, AZ	W 18–0^{5}	43–2	11–0
Apr 20	at Arizona State	Tempe, AZ	W 8–0	44–2	12–0
Apr 23	at Oregon State	Corvallis, OR	W 8–0	45–2	13–0
Apr 23	at Oregon State	Corvallis, OR	W 7–2	46–2	14–0
Apr 24	at Oregon	Howe Field • Eugene, OR	W 11–1	47–2	15–0
Apr 24	at Oregon	Howe Field • Eugene, OR	W 10–7	48–2	16–0
Apr 30	at UCLA	Easton Stadium • Los Angeles, CA	W 3–1^{12}	49–2	17–0
Apr 30	at UCLA	Easton Stadium • Los Angeles, CA	W 4–2	50–2	18–0

May
Date	Opponent	Site/stadium	Score	Overall record	Pac-10 record
May 6	Oregon State	Rita Hillenbrand Memorial Stadium • Tucson, AZ	W 13–0^{5}	51–2	19–0
May 6	Oregon State	Rita Hillenbrand Memorial Stadium • Tucson, AZ	W 12–0^{5}	52–2	20–0
May 7	Oregon	Rita Hillenbrand Memorial Stadium • Tucson, AZ	W 7–1	53–2	21–0
May 7	Oregon	Rita Hillenbrand Memorial Stadium • Tucson, AZ	W 13–3^{6}	54–2	22–0
May 8	San Jose State*	Rita Hillenbrand Memorial Stadium • Tucson, AZ	W 8–0^{5}	55–2	
May 8	San Jose State	Rita Hillenbrand Memorial Stadium • Tucson, AZ	W 4–3	56–2	
May 14	at Washington	Husky Softball Stadium • Seattle, WA	W 2–1	57–2	23–0
May 14	at Washington	Husky Softball Stadium • Seattle, WA	L 1–2	57–3	23–1

Postseason

NCAA Regional
Date	Opponent	Site/stadium	Score	Overall record	NCAAT record
May 20	Canisius	Rita Hillenbrand Memorial Stadium • Tucson, AZ	W 7–0	58–3	1–0
May 21	Texas A&M	Rita Hillenbrand Memorial Stadium • Tucson, AZ	W 5–0	59–3	2–0
May 22	Texas A&M	Rita Hillenbrand Memorial Stadium • Tucson, AZ	W 6–0	60–3	3–0

NCAA Women's College World Series
Date	Opponent	Site/stadium	Score	Overall record	WCWS Record
May 26	UIC	ASA Hall of Fame Stadium • Oklahoma City, OK	W 8–0^{5}	61–3	1–0
May 27	Fresno State	ASA Hall of Fame Stadium • Oklahoma City, OK	W 3–0	62–3	2–0
May 29	UCLA	ASA Hall of Fame Stadium • Oklahoma City, OK	W 5–2	63–3	3–0
May 30	Cal State Northridge	ASA Hall of Fame Stadium • Oklahoma City, OK	W 4–0	64–3	4–0
