= Kara Foster =

Kara Foster may refer to:

- Kara Foster (softball), see NCAA Division I softball career 50 home runs list
- Kara Foster, character in The Last Ship (TV series)
