= List of Cal State Northridge Matadors head softball coaches =

The Cal State Northridge Matadors softball program is a college softball team that represents California State University, Northridge in the Big West Conference in the National Collegiate Athletic Association. The team has had 8 head coaches since it started playing organized softball in the 1977 season. The current coach is Jodie Cox, who took over the head coaching position in 2026.

Gary Torgeson holds all major coaching records, having claimed four national championships at the NCAA Division II level, and made six other appearances in the final rounds at both the Division I and II level, including an NCAA Division I runner-up in 1994.

== Key ==
General
| # | Number of coaches (Note: A running total of the number of head coaches.) |
| GC | Games coached |

Overall
| OW | Wins |
| OL | Losses |
| OT | Ties |
| O% | Winning percentage |

Conference (Note: Cal State Northridge was a member of the Southern California Athletic Association from 1977 to 1981. From 1982 to 1990, they played as part of the NCAA Division II California Collegiate Athletic Association. After moving to Division I, they played their transition seasons as an Independent before joining the Western Athletic Conference for four seasons. They joined the Big West Conference in 1997.)
| CW | Wins |
| CL | Losses |
| CT | Ties |
| C% | Winning percentage |

Postseason (Note: Postseason play involving the NCAA Division I Softball Championship or AIAW Women's College World Series.)
| PA | Total Appearances (Note: Postseason appearances include seasons with NCAA Division I or Division II Softball Championship bids since the tournament began in 1982.) |
| PW | Total Wins |
| PL | Total Losses |
| WA | Women's College World Series appearances (Note: College World Series appearances include seasons with WCWS bids since the tournament began in 1969.) |
| WW | Women's College World Series wins |
| WL | Women's College World Series losses |

Championships
| CC | Conference regular season |
| NC | National championships (Note: Women's College World Series sponsored by either the AIAW or NCAA.) |

== Coaches ==
List of head softball coaches showing season(s) coached, overall records, conference records, postseason records, championships and selected awards (Note: Statistics correct as of the end of the 2025 NCAA Division I softball season.)
| # | Name | Term | GC | OW | OL | OT | O% | CW | CL | CT | C% | PA | WA | CCs | NCs |
|---|---|---|---|---|---|---|---|---|---|---|---|---|---|---|---|
| 1 | Tony Venditto | 1977–1981 | 166 | 83 | 83 | 0 | .500 | 13 | 12 | 0 | .520 | 3 | 2 | — | — |
| 2 | Gary Torgeson | 1982–1994 | 857 | 636 | 213 | 8 | .747 | 179 | 35 | 0 | .836 | 9 | 8 | 9 | 4 |
| 3 | Janet Sherman | 1995–2001 | 396 | 245 | 148 | 3 | .622 | 132 | 55 | 0 | .706 | 7 | — | 2 | — |
| 4 | Barbara Jordan | 2002–2009 | 380 | 202 | 177 | 1 | .533 | 81 | 83 | 0 | .494 | 3 | — | — | — |
| 5 | Roni Sperrey | 2010 | 53 | 31 | 22 | 0 | .585 | 15 | 6 | 0 | .714 | — | — | 1 | — |
| 6 | Tairia Flowers | 2011–2020 | 522 | 259 | 263 | 0 | .496 | 93 | 99 | 0 | .484 | 1 | — | 1 | — |
| 7 | Charlotte Morgan | 2021–2025 | 237 | 109 | 126 | 0 | .464 | 63 | 69 | 0 | .477 | — | — | — | — |
| 8 | Jodie Cox | 2026 | First season | | | | | | | | | | | | |
