= NCAA Division I softball career .400 batting average list =

There are currently 134 batters and 51 records in the .400 Batting Average Club:

- Note every player on the list played four seasons (except those currently with one year eligibility remaining) of at least 30 at-bats.

Batting Average	Batter	School(s)	Years
.467	Jill Justin	Northern Illinois Huskies	1986–1989
.466	Alison McCutcheon	Arizona Wildcats	1995–1998
.466	Stacey Nuveman	UCLA Bruins	1997–2002
.461	Chelsea Bramlett	Mississippi State Bulldogs	2007–2010
.460	Kacie Burnett	Idaho State Bengals	2014–2017
.458	Michelle Minton	Coastal Carolina Chanticleers	1991–1994
.456	Sammy Marshall	Western Illinois Leathernecks	2012–2015
.452	Amber Jackson	Bethune–Cookman Wildcats & Maryland Terrapins	2003–2007
.452	Jeanne Weinsheim	San Diego Toreros	1986–1989
.451	Morgan Zerkle	Marshall Thundering Herd	2014–2017
.450	Natasha Watley	UCLA Bruins	2000–2003
.449	La'Tosha Williams	Delaware State Hornets	1993–1997
.447	Haylie McCleney	Alabama Crimson Tide	2013–2016
.447	Meg Thompson	Canisius Golden Griffins	1988–1991
.446	Kaitlin Cochran	Arizona State Sun Devils	2006–2009
.446	Denelle Hicks	Campbell Fighting Camels	1993–1996
.446	Caitlin Lowe	Arizona Wildcats	2004–2007
.443	Tanisha Kemp	Morgan State Bears	1996–1999
.442	Raven Chavanne	Tennessee Lady Vols	2010–2013
.441	Sierra Romero	Michigan Wolverines	2013–2016
.439	Jenny Topping	Washington Huskies & Cal State Fullerton Titans	1999–2003
.437	Kayla Braud	Alabama Crimson Tide	2010–2013
.437	Kelly Kretschman	Alabama Crimson Tide	1998–2001
.436	Nicole Gazzola	Delaware State Hornets	2013–2016
.435	Robyne Yorke	Fresno State Bulldogs	1994–1997
.434	Yvette Cannon	George Mason Patriots	1983–1986
.433	Stephanie Thompson	Brown Bears	2010–2013
.433	Jen Yee	Niagara Purple Eagles & Georgia Tech Yellow Jackets	2006–2010
.431	Crystal Boyd	Hofstra Pride	1991–1994
.431	Jessica Falca	Coastal Carolina Chanticleers	1996–1999
.431	Robin Francisco	George Mason Patriots	1983–1986
.431	Tiff Tootle	South Carolina Gamecocks	1990–1993
.430	Janae Jefferson	Texas Longhorns	2018–2021
.429	Martha Covington	Campbell Fighting Camels	1996–1999
.429	Jennifer Drum	Manhattan Jaspers	1992–1995
.429	Sydni Emanuel	Texas Tech Red Raiders & Georgia Bulldogs	2014–2017
.428	Leah O'Brien	Arizona Wildcats	1993–1997
.428	Kellie Wilkerson	Mississippi State Bulldogs	1999–2002
.425	Jocelyn Alo	Oklahoma Sooners	2018–2021
.425	Oli Keohohou	BYU Cougars & Long Beach State 49ers	2001–2005
.425	Katie Lacour	Southeastern Louisiana Lions	2013–2016
.424	Linda Rush	Drexel Dragons	2017–2021
.423	Keneshia McKee	Alabama State Hornets	1999–2002
.423	Kim Miller	Lehigh Mountain Hawks	1993–1996
.423	Torrian Wright	Savannah State Lady Tigers	2013–2016
.422	Kayla Kowalik	Kentucky Wildcats	2018–2021
.422	Nicki Robbins	Army Black Knights	1999–2002
.422	Jody Tassone	Canisius Golden Griffins	1993–1996
.421	Michelle Oswald	Northeastern Illinois Golden Eagles	1995–1998
.420	Courtney Cashman	UMass Lowell River Hawks	2017–2021
.419	Lexi Watts	UIC Flames	2016–2019
.419	Laura Williams	Georgia Tech Yellow Jackets	1994–1997
.419	Tammy Williams	Northwestern Wildcats	2006–2009
.418	Karley Wester	Notre Dame Fighting Irish	2014–2017
.418	Ali Viola	Nebraska Cornhuskers	1995–1998
.417	Allexis Bennett	UCLA Bruins	2013–2016
.417	Cortni Emanuel	Georgia Bulldogs	2015–2018
.417	Katie Keller	Northern Illinois Huskies	2019–2021
.417	Brittany Lastrapes	Arizona Wildcats	2008–2011
.417	Laurie Miller	Canisius Golden Griffins	1987–1990
.417	Brittany Rogers	Alabama Crimson Tide	2006–2009
.416	Autumn Champion	Arizona Wildcats	2003–2006
.416	Jessica Mendoza	Stanford Cardinal	1999–2002
.416	Leslie Sims	Indiana State Sycamores	2017–2021
.415	Courtney Ceo	Oregon Ducks	2011–2014
.415	Amy Chellevold	Arizona Wildcats	1992–1995
.415	April Setterlund	Boston Terriers	2008–2011
.414	Laura Berg	Fresno State Bulldogs	1994–1998
.414	Lauren May	Cornell Big Red	2002–2005
.414	Lexi Osowski	Austin Peay Governors	2019–2021
.414	Kim Rondina	UNLV Rebels	1994–1997
.413	Nicole Barber	Georgia Bulldogs	2001–2004
.413	Nina Lindenberg	Long Beach State 49ers & Fresno State Bulldogs	1995–1998
.413	Courtney Young	Howard Bison	2007–2010
.412	Rachel Anderson	Southeast Missouri State Redhawks	2017–2021
.411	Jenny Dalton	Arizona Wildcats	1993–1996
.411	Tatyana Forbes	Coastal Carolina Chanticleers, FIU Golden Panthers & NC State Wolfpack	2016–2021
.411	Nicole Giordano	Arizona Wildcats	1998–2001
.411	Linda Smolka	Princeton Tigers	1986–1989
.411	Jen Weaver	Towson Tigers	1993–1996
.410	Lauren Bauer	Arizona Wildcats	1998–2001
.410	Megan Blank	Iowa Hawkeyes	2012–2015
.410	Jenna Cozza	Massachusetts Minutewomen	2014–2018
.409	Kaelynn Greene	Marshall Thundering Herd	2013–2016
.409	Ericka Nesbitt	Campbell Fighting Camels	2012–2015
.409	Lili Piper	Akron Zips & Ohio State Buckeyes	2016–2019
.408	Samantha Meenaghan	Gardner–Webb Runnin' Bulldogs	2011–2014
.407	Ivie Drake	Georgia State Panthers	2015–2018
.407	Kate Gordon	James Madison Dukes	2017–2021
.407	Kelly Kapp	Bradley Braves	2014–2017
.407	Kyla Walker	Baylor Bears	2016–2020
.407	Ali Wester	Notre Dame Fighting Irish	2016–2019
.406	Emily Carosone	Auburn Tigers	2013–2016
.406	Princess Daniels	Texas Southern Tigers	2011–2014
.406	Kristi DiMeo	Drexel Dragons	2018–2021
.406	Sara Graziano	Miami RedHawks & Coastal Carolina Chanticleers	1991–1994
.406	Alissa Haber	Stanford Cardinal	2007–2010
.406	Amanda Lorenz	Florida Gators	2016–2019
.406	Erica McNew	Cleveland State Vikings	2013–2016
.406	Melissa Rahrich	Stony Brook Seawolves	2017–2021
.405	Julie Fernandez	Lehigh Mountain Hawks	2009–2012
.405	Rachel Folden	Marshall Thundering Herd	2005–2008
.405	Annie Kinsey	Pennsylvania Quakers	2005–2008
.405	Mackenzie Leonard	Illinois State Redbirds	2019–2021
.405	Dana Pellegrino	Fairfield Stags	1985–1988
.405	Stephanie Texeira	FIU Panthers	2014–2017
.404	Sue Duke	Vermont Catamounts	1990–1994
.404	Jessica Madrid	Delaware State Hornets & San Jose State Spartans	2013–2016
.404	Jackie Pasquerella	Villanova Wildcats	1998–2001
.404	Navia Penrod	North Florida Ospreys	2016–2019
.403	Emilee Koerner	Notre Dame Fighting Irish	2012–2015
.403	Yvon Minogue	South Dakota Coyotes	2013–2016
.403	Vanessa Shippy	Oklahoma State Cowgirls	2015–2018
.403	Toni Wiggins	Towson Tigers	1988–1991
.402	Emily Allard	Northwestern Wildcats	2010–2014
.402	Megan Baltzell	Longwood Lancers	2012–2015
.402	Norrelle Dickson	Oklahoma Sooners	2004–2007
.402	Barb Gaines	Missouri State Bears	1990–1993
.402	Ashley Hansen	Stanford Cardinal	2009–2012
.402	Erin Hickey	DePaul Blue Demons	1994–1997
.402	Jasmin Riley	Alabama A&M Bulldogs	2010–2013
.402	Rhea Taylor	Missouri Tigers	2008–2011
.402	Tiffany Whitton	Harvard Crimson	2000–2003
.401	Caitlin Attfield	UAB Blazers	2013–2016
.401	Kara Nelson	Illinois State Redbirds	2007–2011
.401	Jenavee Peres	San Diego State Aztecs & UCLA Bruins	2015–2021
.401	Erika Piancastelli	McNeese State Cowgirls	2015–2018
.401	Ryan Washington	Longwood Lancers	2005–2008
.400	Gina Carbonatto	Pacific Tigers	2004–2007
.400	Camilla Carrera	UTEP Miners	2008–2012
.400	Lexie Elkins	Texas Tech Red Raiders & ULL Ragin' Cajuns	2013–2016
.400	Jamie Foutch	Oklahoma State Cowgirls	1996–1999
.400	Justyce McClain	McNeese State Cowgirls	2016–2019
.400	Brehanna Rodrigues	Alabama State Hornets	2010–2013
.400	Leslie Samson	Canisius Golden Griffins	1990–1993

== Progression ==
Jill Justin eclipsed the original batting average record held by Yvette Cannon. After just three seasons, Justin was hitting a combined .475 (192/404). She ended her career playing in a doubleheader sweep of the DePaul Blue Demons (the Huskies outscored the Blue Demons 9-1) on May 5, 1989.

Since the conclusion of Justin's competitive days, four other collegiate batters have surpassed her single career batting average record. However, none of them played all four eligible seasons but at least two of a minimum 250 at-bats (the NCAA Division I career parameter):

- Stacy Cowen – .530 (160/302); Manhattan Jaspers, 1991–1992
- Kelly Knight – .489 (131/268); Delaware State Hornets, 1993–1995
- Patricia Del Real – .473 (132/279); Jackson State Tigers & Alabama State Hornets, 2002–2004
- Koteria Harris – .468 (150/320); Alcorn State Braves, 1997–1999.

== Hits ==
In addition, there are currently 20 hitters in the .400 batting average club that amassed at least 330 hits in their career:

Alison McCutcheon – 405; Laura Berg – 396; Natasha Watley – 395; Nicole Barber – 379; Amy Chellevold – 371; Kelly Kretschman – 368; Chelsea Bramlett – 359; Nicole Giordano – 359; Robyne Yorke – 357; Raven Chavanne – 355; Caitlin Lowe – 351; Tiff Tootle – 351; Lauren Bauer – 349; Amber Jackson – 348; Kayla Braud – 344; Brittany Rogers – 343; Jessica Falca – 341; Leah O'Brien – 338; Brittany Lastrapes – 337; Cortni Emanuel - 331.

== Records & Milestones ==
Sara Graziano set the NCAA record for batting average by hitting .588 in 1994; Robin Francisco made the list despite hitting a club low .263 in 1986. La'Tosha Williams owns the freshman class record for batting average with a .521 mark set in 1993. Graziano also had the best hit streak in NCAA history during 43 consecutive games from April 8, 1993 – March 24, 1994. Lauren Bauer achieved a 1.000 batting average with the NCAA second-best perfect game at the plate by going 6/6 on May 6, 2000. Alison McCutcheon tallied 132 base knocks in 1997 for a .534 average and the NCAA record for season hits. Nina Lindenberg hit 29 doubles for another all-time record and hit .507 in 1996. Jen Yee accumulated the best slugging percentage in 2010 at 1.270% and a .567 average.

Along with Graziano in 1994, Yee in 2010, Torrian Wright (.566 in 2015), Janae Jefferson (.554 in 2020) and Tatyana Forbes (.537 in 2020) rank top-10 all-time for NCAA season batting average. Also with Graziano in 1994, Williams in 1993, Yee in 2010, Wright in 2015, Robin Francisco (.474 in 1984 ), Jill Justin (.503 in 1987 & .484 in 1988), Meg Thompson (.483 in 1990), Crystal Boyd (.513 in 1992), Jen Weaver (.514 in 1996), Tanisha Kemp (.519 in 1998), Jessica Mendoza (.474 in 2000), Oli Keohohou (.458 in 2001), Stacey Nuveman (.528 in 2002), Amber Jackson (.490 in 2003), Autumn Champion (.488 in 2004), Kaitlin Cochran (.492 in 2007), Stephanie Thompson (.504 in 2011), Courtney Ceo (.493 in 2014), Lexie Elkins (.509 in 2016), Kacie Burnett (.487 in 2017), Courtney Cashman (.507 in 2019) and Kayla Kowalik (.495 in 2021) all led those NCAA years in average.

Finally, McCutcheon (.450 in 1996) & 1997, Lindenberg (.449 in 1998), Nuveman (.445 in 1999), Champion (.408 in 2006), Cochran (.439 in 2008), Amy Chellevold (.379 in 1993 & .504 in 1994), Jenny Dalton (.318 in 1993, .434 in 1994 & .469 in 1996), Leah O'Brien (.374 in 1993, .416 in 1994 & .467 in 1997), Laura Berg (.457 in 1998), Lauren Bauer (.426 in 2001), Nicole Giordano (.393 in 2001), Natasha Watley (.481 in 2003), Caitlin Lowe (.424 in 2006 & .414 in 2007), Kayla Braud (.340 in 2012) and Jocelyn Alo (.475 in 2021) all won national championships in those years; O'Brien also set the Women's College World Series record for batting average at .750 in 1994. For their careers, Nuveman and McCutcheon (Pac-12), Bramlett (SEC), Kacie Burnett (Big Sky), Sammy Marshall (Summit), Morgan Zerkle (USA), Jeanne Weinsheim (WCC), Sierra Romero (Big Ten), Jenny Topping (Big West in three seasons with .442 average), Thompson (Ivy), Janae Jefferson (Big 12), Keohohou (MWC in three seasons with a .436 average), Linda Rush (CAA), Katie Lacour (Southland), Kim Miller (Patriot), Courtney Cashman (America East), Lexi Watts (Horizon), Katie Keller (MAC), Leslie Sims (MVC), Lexi Osowski (OVC), Lindenberg (WAC in three seasons with a .440 average), Jen Yee (ACC in two seasons with .426 average), Graziano (Big South in two seasons with .522 average) and Elkins (Sun Belt in three seasons with a .430 average) all own these conference career batting titles.

== Links ==
- NCAA Division I softball career 200 RBIs list
- NCAA Division I softball career 50 home runs list
