= 1994 Cal State Northridge Matadors softball team =

American college softball season

1994 Cal State Northridge Matadors softball

NCAA Regional No. 3 champion WAC champion

Women's College World Series, runner-up
- Conference: Western Athletic Conference
- Record: 52–10 (21–3 WAC)
- Head coach: Gary Torgeson (13th season)
- Home stadium: Matador Diamond

1994 Western Athletic Conference softball standings
	Conf.						Overall
Team	W		L		T	PCT	W		L		T	PCT
Cal State Northridge ‍†‍‍^{y}	21	–	3	–	0	.875	52	–	10	–	0	.839
Utah ‍‍‍^{y}	22	–	4	–	0	.846	51	–	13	–	0	.797
Fresno State ‍‍‍^{y}	21	–	5	–	0	.808	49	–	16	–	0	.754
New Mexico ‍‍‍	11	–	15	–	0	.423	26	–	22	–	0	.542
Sacramento State ‍‍‍	11	–	16	–	1	.411	25	–	30	–	1	.455
Colorado State ‍‍‍	9	–	16	–	0	.360	22	–	30	–	1	.425
San Diego State ‍‍‍	4	–	19	–	1	.188	21	–	29	–	1	.422
Southern Utah ‍‍‍	1	–	22	–	0	.043	6	–	42	–	0	.125
† – Conference champion y – Invited to the NCAA tournament

The 1994 Cal State Northridge Matadors softball team represented California State University, Northridge in the 1994 NCAA Division I softball season. The Matadors were coached by Gary Torgeson, who led his thirteenth season. The Matadors finished with a record of 52–10. They competed in the Western Athletic Conference, where they finished first with a 21–3 record.

The Matadors were invited to the 1994 NCAA Division I softball tournament, where they won the NCAA Regional No. 3 and then completed a run to the title game of the Women's College World Series where they fell to champion Arizona.

In the aftermath of the 1994 Northridge earthquake, the team was a rallying point for the university which famously refused to close, despite several building collapses and classes moving into trailers after the severe earthquake centered near the campus.

== Roster ==
1994 Cal State Northridge Matadors roster
Pitchers: - Kathy Blake-Small; - Amy Windmiller; - Jennifer Richardson; Catchers: - Scia Maumausolo; - Jennifer Parker	Infielders: - Kelly Hunt; - Tamara Ivie; - Shannon Jones; - Kelli Koens; - Vicky Rios; - LeeAnn Taylor; - Kelly Toovey	Outfielders: - Beth Calcante; - Jen Fleming; - Traci Gallian; - Kari Hazlett; - Terri Pearson; - Shelby Wilcox; Unknown: - Diane Garza; - Janel Vega

== Schedule ==
Legend
	Cal State Northridge win
	Cal State Northridge loss
*	Non-Conference game

1994 Cal State Northridge Matadors softball game log
Regular season

February
Date	Opponent	Site/stadium	Score	Overall record	WAC Record
Feb 13	at Cal State Fullerton*	Anderson Family Field • Fullerton, CA	L 0–1	0–1	
Feb 13	at Cal State Fullerton*	Anderson Family Field • Fullerton, CA	W 4–0^{13}	1–1	
Feb 19	vs Long Beach State*	San Diego, CA (San Diego State Campbell/Cartier Classic)	W 5–0	2–1	
Feb 19	vs Washington	San Diego, CA (San Diego State Campbell/Cartier Classic)	W 1–0	3–1	
Feb 24	at Long Beach State*	LBSU Softball Complex • Long Beach, CA	W 7–1	4–1	
Feb 24	at Long Beach State*	LBSU Softball Complex • Long Beach, CA	W 2–1	5–1	
Feb 26	vs California*	San Jose, CA (San Jose State Fabulous Four Tournament)	W 2–0	6–1	
Feb 26	at San Jose State*	San Jose, CA (San Jose State Fabulous Four Tournament)	W 1–0	7–1	
Feb 26	vs Santa Clara*	San Jose, CA (San Jose State Fabulous Four Tournament)	W 13–0	8–1	
Feb 27	vs California*	San Jose, CA (San Jose State Fabulous Four Tournament)	W 1–0	9–1	
Feb 27	at San Jose State*	San Jose, CA (San Jose State Fabulous Four Tournament)	L 0–1	9–2	
Feb 27	vs Santa Clara*	San Jose, CA (San Jose State Fabulous Four Tournament)	W 3–0	10–2	

March
Date	Opponent	Site/stadium	Score	Overall record	WAC Record
Mar 6	at UC Santa Barbara*	Santa Barbara, CA	W 3–0	11–2	
Mar 6	at UC Santa Barbara*	Santa Barbara, CA	W 10–0	12–2	
Mar 12	Missouri*	Matador Diamond • Northridge, CA	W 8–1	13–2	
Mar 12	Missouri*	Matador Diamond • Northridge, CA	W 12–0	14–2	
Mar 18	Southern Utah	Matador Diamond • Northridge, CA	W 10–0	15–2	1–0
Mar 18	Southern Utah	Matador Diamond • Northridge, CA	W 19–0	16–2	2–0
Mar 21	Kansas*	Matador Diamond • Northridge, CA	L 1–3	16–3	
Mar 21	Kansas*	Matador Diamond • Northridge, CA	W 1–0	17–3	
Mar 22	Ohio State*	Matador Diamond • Northridge, CA	W 9–0	18–3	
Mar 22	Ohio State*	Matador Diamond • Northridge, CA	W 3–1	19–3	
Mar 23	vs UMass*	Anderson Family Field • Fullerton, CA (Cal State Fullerton Pony Tournament)	W 8–1	20–3	
Mar 23	vs Minnesota*	Anderson Family Field • Fullerton, CA (Cal State Fullerton Pony Tournament)	W 8–0	21–3	
Mar 25	vs Oregon*	Anderson Family Field • Fullerton, CA (Cal State Fullerton Pony Tournament)	W 3–0	22–3	
Mar 26	vs Georgia State*	Anderson Family Field • Fullerton, CA (Cal State Fullerton Pony Tournament)	L 1–2	22–4	
Mar 27	at Cal State Fullerton*	Anderson Family Field • Fullerton, CA	W 1–0	23–4	

April
Date	Opponent	Site/stadium	Score	Overall record	WAC Record
Apr 1	at Sacramento State	Shea Stadium • Sacramento, CA	W 3–2^{12}	24–4	3–0
Apr 1	at Sacramento State	Shea Stadium • Sacramento, CA	W 2–0	25–4	4–0
Apr 2	at Fresno State	Bulldog Diamond • Fresno, CA	L 2–5	25–5	4–1
Apr 2	at Fresno State	Bulldog Diamond • Fresno, CA	W 3–1	26–5	5–1
Apr 6	UCLA*	Matador Diamond • Northridge, CA	W 2–1	27–5	
Apr 6	UCLA*	Matador Diamond • Northridge, CA	W 6–1	28–5	
Apr 8	New Mexico*	Matador Diamond • Northridge, CA	L 1–2	28–6	5–2
Apr 8	New Mexico*	Matador Diamond • Northridge, CA	W 10–0	29–6	6–2
Apr 9	Colorado State*	Matador Diamond • Northridge, CA	W 6–0	30–6	7–2
Apr 9	Colorado State*	Matador Diamond • Northridge, CA	W 2–0	31–6	8–2
Apr 10	Arizona State*	Matador Diamond • Northridge, CA	W 2–1^{8}	32–6	
Apr 10	Arizona State*	Matador Diamond • Northridge, CA	W 10–0	33–6	
Apr 16	San Diego State	Matador Diamond • Northridge, CA	W 4–3	34–6	9–2
Apr 16	San Diego State	Matador Diamond • Northridge, CA	W 10–0	35–6	10–2
Apr 22	at Utah	Utah Softball Stadium • Salt Lake City, UT	L 1–2	35–7	10–3
Apr 22	at Utah	Utah Softball Stadium • Salt Lake City, UT	W 7–0	36–7	11–3
Apr 23	at Southern Utah	Cedar City, UT	W 14–1	37–7	12–3
Apr 23	at Southern Utah	Cedar City, UT	W 13–0	38–7	13–3
Apr 30	at New Mexico	Albuquerque, NM	W 5–1	39–7	14–3
Apr 30	at New Mexico	Albuquerque, NM	W 7–1	40–7	15–3

May
Date	Opponent	Site/stadium	Score	Overall record	WAC Record
May 7	at San Diego State	San Diego, CA	W 2–0	41–7	16–3
May 7	at San Diego State	San Diego, CA	W 7–0	42–7	17–3
May 13	Fresno State	Matador Diamond • Northridge, CA	W 1–0	43–7	18–3
May 13	Fresno State	Matador Diamond • Northridge, CA	W 2–0	44–7	19–3
May 14	Sacramento State	Matador Diamond • Northridge, CA	W 3–1	45–7	20–3
May 14	Sacramento State	Matador Diamond • Northridge, CA	W 10–0	46–7	21–3

Postseason

NCAA Regional No. 3
Date	Opponent	Site/stadium	Score	Overall record	NCAAT record
May 20	Maine	Matador Diamond • Northridge, CA	W 8–0	47–7	1–0
May 21	Cal State Fullerton	Matador Diamond • Northridge, CA	W 9–0	48–7	2–0
May 22	Cal State Fullerton	Matador Diamond • Northridge, CA	L 0–2	48–8	2–1
May 22	Cal State Fullerton	Matador Diamond • Northridge, CA	W 4–0	49–8	3–1

NCAA Women's College World Series
Date	Opponent	Rank (Seed)	Site/stadium	Score	Overall record	WCWS Record
May 26	(7) Missouri	(2)	ASA Hall of Fame Stadium • Oklahoma City, OK	W 5–3	50–8	1–0
May 27	(6) Utah	(2)	ASA Hall of Fame Stadium • Oklahoma City, OK	W 5–1	51–8	2–0
May 29	(3) Oklahoma State	(2)	ASA Hall of Fame Stadium • Oklahoma City, OK	L 2–3^{15}	51–9	2–1
May 29	(3) Oklahoma State	(2)	ASA Hall of Fame Stadium • Oklahoma City, OK	W 4–2	52–9	3–1
May 30	(1) Arizona	(2)	ASA Hall of Fame Stadium • Oklahoma City, OK	L 0–4	52–10	3–2
