= Ali Viola =

American softball player

Personal information
- Born: January 1, 1976 (age 50) Novato, California, U.S.

Sport
- Country: USA
- Sport: Softball
- College team: Nebraska

Ali Viola (born January 1, 1976) is an American former collegiate All-American softball player and coach. She played college softball for Nebraska from 1995 to 1998. She owns various records for the school and is one of ten NCAA Division I hitters to accumulate a career .400 batting average with 200 RBIs and 50 home runs.

== Nebraska Cornhuskers ==
For her freshman season, Viola was named to the then Big Eight Conference First Team, as well as garnering both the “Rookie of The Year” and “Player of The Year” honors. In addition, she was named a Second Team All-American. Viola broke and set new school season records for RBIs, hits, home runs, and slugging percentage, both the RBI and hits still stand. Her average and doubles were and remain second best all-time at the university. She broke most of the same records for the Big 8 that season and they all remain in the top-10 for the Big 12, while leading in average, RBIs, home runs and hits, earning a conference Triple Crown that year. Viola also achieved a career and then school best 19 consecutive game hit streak from April 10–29.

In the newly dubbed Big 12, Viola was named to the 1996 Second Team and designated a First Team All-American. Viola broke her own home run and posted a new base on balls record. She led the Big 12 in RBIs and home runs while her 85 hits were the conference’s second best total, now sitting inside the top-10 all-time for a season. All her other season stats were and are top-5 school records.

In 1997 Viola lasted just 21 games before injury forced her to retire for the season. She responded the following year by being named all-conference, Big 12 Player of the Year and First Team All-American. Viola broke the season home runs, walks and slugging percentage records (all career bests) for the Cornhuskers. Her average, RBIs and hits were and remain top-5 school season records. That year she led the conference in all the latter categories, except hits and walks, to win a second conference Triple Crown.

March 19-April 10, Viola matched her career best 19 consecutive game hit streak. Prior the NCAA tournament, Viola would become just the second player to join the exclusive club of .400 average, 200 RBIs and 50 home runs at the tail end of Big 12 play and into the conference tournament that year. The Cornhuskers made the Women's College World Series and on May 21 vs. the Fresno State Bulldogs, Viola was perfect at the plate (3/3) with the only RBI in the loss. Although shutout in her next game with the Texas Longhorns, the team posted a victory to meet the Washington Huskies on May 23. Viola hit a home run in her final collegiate at-bat to close out her career and seal her spot on the All-Tournament team going (4/8) with 2RBIs and a walk.

Overall for her career, Viola claims the school career records for batting average, RBIs, doubles and slugging percentage; she is second in hits and home runs. For the Big 12 conference, she ranks top-10 in every offense category, minus her walks.

== Personal life ==
Viola began her coaching career with the Louisville Cardinals and then spent an equal three years with the Wisconsin Badgers and Cal Poly San Luis Obispo Mustangs. She was Head Coach for the Ohio State Buckeyes and in her tenure has earned a 2007 conference championship and 2009 NCAA tournament super regional appearance.

Viola was also named one of the “25 Women of Distinction” for the Cornhuskers on January 28, 2000. Under a "Make The Team" logo, Viola began offering softball lessons and continues currently. She was also later inducted in the San Marin, California Athletic Hall of Fame.

In 2018, Viola's jersey was retired by her alma mater.

== Statistics ==
Nebraska Cornhuskers
YEAR	G	AB	R	H	BA	RBI	HR	3B	2B	TB	SLG	BB	SO	SB	SBA
1995	63	199	43	87	.437	72	13	1	21	149	.748%	27	18	1	1
1996	65	202	59	85	.421	71	15	3	14	150	.742%	39	20	17	21
1997	21	58	9	19	.327	13	3	0	4	32	.551%	10	8	2	4
1998	60	170	46	72	.423	57	22	0	9	147	.864%	40	19	13	16
TOTALS	209	629	157	263	.418	213	53	4	48	478	.760%	116	65	33	42

== See also ==
- NCAA Division I softball career .400 batting average list
- NCAA Division I softball career 200 RBIs list
- NCAA Division I softball career 50 home runs list
