= Jenny Topping =

American softball player

Personal information
- Born: May 30, 1980 (age 46) Whittier, California, U.S.
- Height: 5 ft 6 in (1.68 m)
- Spouse: Josephine Topping

Sport
- College team: Washington; Cal State Fullerton
Medal record
Women's softball
Representing the United States
Olympic Games
Gold medal – first place	2004 Athens	Team competition

Jenny Louise Topping (born May 30, 1980) is an American, former collegiate four-time first team All-American, medal winning Olympian, retired professional All-Star softball player and current Head Softball Coach at Cal State Bakersfield. Topping played college softball at Washington and Cal State Fullerton primarily as a catcher. She is best known for being a member of the United States women's national softball team at the 2004 Summer Olympics that won a gold medal. She also played professionally in the National Pro Fastpitch for the Akron Racers.

Topping holds numerous school records for both universities and is the Big West Conference batting average champion in just three seasons of play. She is one of nine NCAA players to bat .400, drive in 200 RBIs on at least 50 home runs and an .800 slugging percentage for a career.

== College career ==
=== Washington ===
Topping began her career by playing in only 9 games before tearing her ACL and having to red-shirt the 1999 season. She did hit three home runs, bringing in 11 RBIs and had career single game highs with four base on balls vs. the UIC Flames on February 6 and four hits vs. the Michigan Wolverines a week later on February 19.

In her first full season, Topping earned 2000 First Team All-American citation, along with All-Pac-10 honors and was named Pac-10 Newcomer of the Year. Setting school records for RBIs (NCAA all-time Freshman Class record), home runs, slugging percentage, walks, grand slams (4) and on-base percentage (.565%), while ranking top-5 in average and doubles. Topping led the NCAA in the first three categories and placed herself in its top-10 all-time season rankings for the grand slams, RBI and home run totals. She also led the Pac-10 for the RBI and home run totals that year.

During the week of March 7, Topping garnered National Fastpitch Coaches Association "National Player of The Week" honors for her performance of hitting over .650, driving in double digit RBIs (12) on 5 home runs and slugging an impressive 1.800%. This would help the Husky bat a second all-time best in Washington softball history for a single season. Topping and the Huskies made it into the Women's College World Series but were eventually eliminated by Jennie Finch and the Arizona Wildcats in a 4–2 loss. It would mark Topping's only appearance at the series.

Combined with her limited 1999 stats, Topping currently still retains season records for RBIs and slugging percentage. She is tops in career records for batting average, on-base and slugging percentage. She ranks 5th in career batting average for the renamed Pac-12.

=== Cal State-Fullerton ===
After having transferred onto a new team, Topping continued her career in honors by repeating as an All-American and picked up her first All-Big West selection along with a "Player of The Year" Award. Topping set surviving school and conference season records in RBIs and walks. She also set new Cal State Fullerton Titans season records for on-base percentage and doubles, while ranking merely in the top-5 for batting average, home runs, slugging and runs. This would earn her a conference Triple Crown for the best average, RBI and home run marks, the latter of which she was tied with teammate Yasmin Mossadeghi. Debuting on February 2, 2001, Topping would set a career and single game school record with 5 RBIs vs. the Colorado State Rams.

The junior batted .472 (school record, career best and was the conference record) to again earn all-season honors. Topping also posted top-5 school records in slugging, on base and walks. The Titans won a mercy rule victory (10-1) over the UCSB Gauchos, Topping contributed by smacking her 50th career home run against pitcher Katie Junge on May 4, 2002. Beginning in a Regional win vs. the Stanford Cardinal on May 18, she began a consecutive hitting streak that would reach into her senior year.

Topping's senior season saw her earn her fourth First Team All-American and third Big West all-conference and "Player of The Year" Awards. She set a new Titans record for her .576% on-base percentage to accompany top-5 school and conference records in batting average, slugging and walks. Topping led off the season with a 13 consecutive game hit streak that added to the last games from the 2002 season for 15 in a row before being snapped in a win over the Texas Tech Red Raiders on February 16.

Topping set another single game record for Cal State Fullerton by walking 4 times in 5 trips to the plate against the LSU Tigers on February 22, 2003. On March 2, Topping drove in her 200th career RBIs in a win over the Oregon State Beavers with a perfect 2/2 performance and three RBIs on the occasion.

Topping ended her career as the Titan career record holder in batting average (.442), .771% slugging, .573% on base and walks (137). She also holds top-10 career records in RBIs, hits, home runs, doubles, runs and fielding percentage. She owns the Big West batting crown (in just three seasons) and ranks top-10 for RBIs, home runs, doubles and walks. Overall, the acclaimed hitter would rank top-10 in RBIs, home runs, walks and slugging in all of the NCAA Division I, of which she still does for her career grand slams (5th) total.

== 2004 Olympics ==
Topping made the United States National Team and spent most of the year playing on the Aiming For Athens Tour. Team USA previewed their prowess by scoring a tour best 18 runs off the Army Black Knights in exhibition game 8 on February 28. Topping went 4/5 with 4 RBIs, a home run and scored on two of teammate Lovieanne Jung's three home runs. Topping also hit a walk-off home run vs. the Illinois Fighting Illini on March 4 to preserve the team's perfect Olympic tours record.

At the festival, Topping saw limited time on the field but managed to hit a team best .666 and earned a gold medal as the United States defeated Australia in the title game on August 23.

Topping would go on to also earn a gold medal in 2006 World Championships. In 2008, she served as an alternate for the Beijing Olympics and won a silver medal. On the Bound 4 Beijing Tour she again led the team in batting average. She had been a Team USA member since 2001, starting on the USA Blue Team.

== NPF ==
The Akron Racers rookie played well to earn a spot on the NPF All-Star roster. Her team made it into the Cowles Cup Championship and on August 28, 2005 they outlasted the Chicago Bandits 5–4 in 8-innings to win. Topping hit a double off Jennie Finch.

Topping played two more seasons in 2006 and 2009 respectively and claims a career .328 batting average.

On June 24, 2026, Topping was announced as the Head Softball Coach at Cal State Bakersfield.

== Awards and honors ==
- 2012 Olympic Hall of Fame
- Softball World Champion (2006)
- International Sports Invitational Champion (2005)
- Gold medalist at Athens Olympic Games (2004)
- Gold medalist at Pan American Games (2003)
- Big West Conference Player of the Year (2001–2003)
- First-team All-American (2000–2003)
- Pac-10 Newcomer of the Year (2000)

== Career statistics ==
Washington Huskies & Cal State Fullerton Titans
YEAR	G	AB	R	H	BA	RBI	HR	3B	2B	TB	SLG	BB	SO	SB	SBA
1999	9	24	5	9	.375	11	3	0	0	18	.750%	7	4	0	1
2000	67	176	43	77	.437	90	24	0	20	169	.960%	56	16	2	2
2001	62	168	55	71	.422	59	14	3	19	138	.821%	56	18	0	0
2002	53	142	37	67	.472	33	9	0	14	108	.760%	35	18	0	0
2003	55	144	25	63	.437	36	10	0	11	104	.722%	46	9	0	0
TOTALS	246	654	165	287	.439	229	60	3	64	537	.821%	200	65	2	3

United States National Team
YEAR	AB	R	H	BA	RBI	HR	3B	2B	TB	SLG	BB	SO	SB	SBA
2004	90	22	37	.411	34	6	1	6	63	.700%	13	13	0	0
2008	35	15	19	.543	18	5	0	6	40	1.143%	4	4	0	0
TOTALS	125	37	56	.448	52	11	1	12	103	.824%	17	17	0	0

NPF Akron Racers
YEAR	AB	R	H	BA	RBI	HR	3B	2B	TB	SLG	BB	SO	SB
2005	77	16	29	.376	16	2	0	9	44	.571%	27	9	0
2006	33	5	8	.242	6	1	1	2	15	.454%	7	3	0
2009	91	14	29	.318	24	4	0	4	45	.494%	24	23	2
TOTALS	201	35	66	.328	46	7	1	15	104	.517%	58	35	2

== See also ==
- NCAA Division I softball career .400 batting average list
- NCAA Division I softball career 200 RBIs list
- NCAA Division I softball career 50 home runs list
