= 1986 NAIA World Series =

1986 NAIA baseball tournament
- 1986 NAIA World Series
- Teams: 10
- Format: Double elimination Page playoff
- Finals site: Harris Field; Lewiston, Idaho
- Champions: Grand Canyon (4th title)
- Winning coach: Gil Stafford
- MVP: Greg Duce (1B) (Grand Canyon)

The 1986 NAIA World Series was the 30th annual tournament hosted by the National Association of Intercollegiate Athletics to determine the national champion of baseball among its member colleges and universities in the United States and Canada.

The tournament was played at Harris Field in Lewiston, Idaho.

Grand Canyon (55–18) defeated hosts and two-time defending champions Lewis–Clark State (55–11) in a single-game championship series, 6–5 (after 10 innings), to win the Antelopes' fourth NAIA World Series and first since 1982.

Grand Canyon first baseman Greg Duce was named tournament MVP.

== Bracket ==
=== Preliminary bracket ===
First round
Oklahoma City	9
USC Aiken	8
Lewis–Clark State	11
Southern Tech	3
Consolation First Round
Hawaii–Hilo	8
USC Aiken	9
Southern Tech	3
Missouri Southern State	23

Second round
Point Park	3
Oklahoma City	5
Emporia State	10
Hawaii–Hilo	0
Saint Francis (IL)	3
Lewis–Clark State	10
Grand Canyon	3
Missouri Southern State	1
Consolation Second Round
St. Francis (IL)	2
USC Aiken	9
Point Park	8
Missouri Southern State	3

Third round
Oklahoma City	13
Emporia State	3
Lewis–Clark State	3
Grand Canyon	12
Consolation Third Round (both teams to Semifinals)
Lewis–Clark State	17
USC Aiken	4
Emporia State	0
Point Park	2

Fourth round (both teams to Semifinals)
Oklahoma City	8
Grand Canyon	11

=== Championship bracket ===
Semifinals
Grand Canyon	6	20
Point Park	8	7
Oklahoma City	2	–
Lewis–Clark State	5	–

Championship
Grand Canyon	6^{10}
Lewis–Clark State	5

== See also ==
- 1986 NCAA Division I baseball tournament
- 1986 NCAA Division II baseball tournament
- 1986 NCAA Division III baseball tournament
- 1986 NAIA Softball World Series
