= Megan Baltzell =

American softball player (born 1993)

- Catcher
- Born: November 24, 1993 (age 32); Stafford, Virginia, U.S.

Teams
- Longwood Lancers (2012–2015); Women's National Baseball Team (2016)

Career highlights and awards
- 2013 National Fastpitch Coaches Association Second Team; Big South Softball Player of The Year (2014, 2015)

Megan Baltzell (born November 24, 1993) is an American, former collegiate All-American softball catcher. She played her college career for the Longwood Lancers from 2012 to 2015 and set various school records. She is the Big South Conference career leader in slugging percentage and walks in only three seasons. She was a member of the 2016 Women's National Baseball Team and currently plays slow pitch with the women's national Team Easton. She is also one of nine NCAA Division I players to hit a career .400 with at least 200 RBI, 50 home runs and an .800% slugging percentage for her career.

== Longwood University ==
Baltzell graduated from Mountain View High School where she played softball, basketball and volleyball. She began her Longwood Lancers career by tying the school season record for walks and leading the team in eight offensive categories as a freshman. In her debut on February 11, 2012, Baltzell went (3/5) with a solo home run to score the winning run over the Western Carolina Catamounts. The Lancers spent that year as an Independent before joining the Big South.

Baltzell was named a 2013 National Fastpitch Coaches Association Second Team All-American to accompany First Team All-Big South conference honors. Baltzell was the first in school history to merit the NFCA honor as she broke and set surviving school records with career best in RBIs and home runs; both led and were the top conference season records, of which the home run mark still lasts. Her season hits, slugging (conference best), walks (Longwood season best) and runs still all rank top-5 at the school. Finally, Baltzell led the Nation with her homers and ranked top-5 in slugging. On March 5, Baltzell stole a career high three stolen bases vs. the Winthrop Eagles.

For a second year, Baltzell earned conference First Team honors and added a "Player of The Year" distinction. She broke her own record for walks, in addition her average (career best), slugging and doubles remain top-5 season records. In the conference, Baltzell too set the walks mark and led for the year in average, slugging and on base percentage.

On March 1, 2014, Baltzell achieved a career high 4 hits vs. the Indiana Hoosiers, she would go on to match it again later that year. March 15-April 12, the Lancer batted to a 21 consecutive game hit streak. She hit .547 (35/64) with 25 RBIs, 4 homers, a triple, 8 doubles, 10 walks, 7 steals and slugging .890%, with just two strikeouts over the span. The streak is a top-5 school record.

For a final year, Baltzell earned First Team honors from the conference and was again recognized "Player of The Year." She was later named Big South Female Athlete of The Year. She broke and set school records in slugging and walks (both career highs and the conference benchmarks), the RBI, home runs, on base percentage, runs and stolen bases were top-5 all-time for a Lancer season. Baltzell led the conference in and ranked top-5 in all the same categories for the NCAA, excluding steals.

On opening day, February 6, 2015, she hit her 50th career home run off Tara Tursellino of the Delaware State Hornets. Later on April 4, she would collect her 200th career RBI vs. the Campbell Fighting Camels; connecting for a game-winning, three-run homer to do it. Baltzell set personal single game records in RBIs when she brought in 7 vs. Gardner–Webb Runnin' Bulldogs on May 7 by swatting two home runs, a grand slam among them; the next day walking 4 times in a game with the Charleston Southern Buccaneers, Baltzell won the game scoring on a wild pitch. The Lancers made the NCAA tournament and were able to win a game, their first, but were eliminated on May 16. In her final appearance, Baltzell was one of two to get a hit when she singled in the first, losing to the Utah Utes.

Baltzell completed her studies at Longwood with the career crown in RBIs, hits, home runs, doubles, slugging, walks and runs. She is top-5 in average and stolen bases. For the Big South, she counts for the seasons 2013–15, Baltzell leads in slugging (.952%) and walks (141); she stands top-10 in average (.420), RBIs (195), home runs (67) doubles (43) and runs scored (195). In all of the NCAA, she ranks in home runs (tied 10th), slugging percentage (5th) and with an amassed 5 grand slams (6th).

== Baseball ==
Went to WBSC World Cup of Baseball in South Korea. Hit first homerun of the Tournament. Member of Derby Girls Women's Slowpitch AA Majors Member of COED Holes and Poles Slowpitch.

== Statistics ==
Longwood Lancers
YEAR	G	AB	R	H	BA	RBI	HR	3B	2B	TB	SLG	BB	SO	SB	SBA
2012	55	161	47	56	.348	35	9	2	15	102	.633%	25	45	14	17
2013	61	187	75	76	.406	78	30	2	14	184	.984%	31	22	14	17
2014	56	154	47	69	.448	45	10	3	17	122	.792%	44	5	15	20
2015	59	137	73	56	.409	72	27	0	12	149	1.087%	66	13	24	29
TOTALS	231	639	242	257	.402	230	76	7	58	557	.871%	166	85	67	83

== See also ==
- NCAA Division I softball career .400 batting average list
- NCAA Division I softball career 200 RBIs list
- NCAA Division I softball career 50 home runs list
