= Lexie Elkins =

American softball coach

Current position
- Title: Volunteer assistant coach
- Team: Episcopal HS (Texas)

Biographical details
- Born: August 6, 1995 (age 31); Victoria, Texas, U.S.
- Education: Louisiana

Playing career
- 2013: Texas Tech
- 2014–2016: Louisiana
- Position: Catcher

Coaching career (HC unless noted)
- 2019: Mississippi State (Volunteer asst.)
- 2020–2021: Houston (asst.)
- 2022–present: Episcopal (Bellaire, TX) (Volunteer asst.)

Lexie Elkins

Chicago Bandits – No. 33/7
- Catcher/outfielder
- Born: August 6, 1995 (age 31); Victoria, Texas, U.S.
- Bats: Right Throws: Right

NPF debut
- June 7, 2016, for the Pennsylvania Rebellion

NPF statistics
- Batting average: .656
- Hits: 21
- Home runs: 44
- Runs batted in: 15

Teams
- Pennsylvania Rebellion (2016)

Career highlights and awards
- James J. Corbett Award Winner (2015); NFCA Catcher of the Year (2015); NFCA First Team All-American (2015); NFCA First Team All-Central Region (2015); Sun Belt Conference Tournament All-Tournament Team (2015); Sun Belt Conference Player of the Year (2015); All-Sun Belt First Team (2015); All-Louisiana First Team (2015); USA Softball Player of the Year Top 26 Finalist (2015); Sun Belt Conference Preseason Player of the Year (2015); USA Softball Player of the Year Top 50 Watchlist (2015); USA Softball Selection Camp Invitee (2015); NFCA Third Team All-American (2014); NFCA First Team All-Central Region (2014); Sun Belt Conference Tournament All-Tournament Team (2014); Sun Belt Conference Player of the Year (2014); All-Sun Belt First Team (2014); Louisiana Sports Writers Association Hitter of the Year (2014); Louisiana Sports Writers Association Newcomer of the Year (2014); All-Louisiana First Team (2014)

Alexandrea "Lexie" Kenedie Elkins (born August 6, 1995) is an American softball coach, she served as the assistant coach at Houston. She is also a former collegiate All-American, and retired softball catcher. She began her college softball career at Texas Tech in 2013 before transferring to Louisiana for the 2014–16 seasons, where she set numerous school records. She is the Sun Belt Conference career leader in batting average and slugging percentage in only three seasons. She is also one of nine NCAA Division I players to hit a career .400 with 200 RBIs, 50 home runs and an .800% slugging percentage for a career.

== Playing career ==
=== Texas Tech ===
Elkins began her Texas Tech Red Raiders career debuting on February 8, 2013, hitting a double to score two runs and beat the UCF Knights. That year she had the best plate discipline on the team, only fanning 7 times, and was second in fielding percentage.

=== Louisiana ===
As a sophomore, she was named a 2014 National Fastpitch Coaches Association Third Team All-American, with First Team All-Sun Belt and "Player of The Year" conference honors in addition. Elkins posted career highs in hits, doubles and the second best school record for home runs, which led and was atop the conference, along with her RBIs and walks totals. Elkins also ranked top-5 in the same categories, minus the walks, for the NCAA.

In a March 6 contest, Elkins collected a career-high 7 RBIs vs. the Lamar Lady Cardinals by hitting a double and two home runs. The Ragin' Cajuns made a trip to the Women's College World Series but did not get a win. In her only career appearance at the WCWS, Elkins went 2/5, both of her hits were solo home runs.

Elkins again earned conference First Team honors, "Player of The Year" recognition and an NFCA First Team citation. She broke the school records for home runs and slugging to also set the conference season standards; in addition, both Elkins' totals and her RBIs were also top-5 NCAA records, she was tops for home runs (which also set the all-time junior class record).

On March 13, 2015, Elkins mustered a career-best 4 hits vs. the UTA Mavericks, she would go on to match it twice more that season. For one of those games on April 18 against the Appalachian State Mountaineers, she tied a school and conference record by sending out three home runs. She achieved the feat by also hitting those home runs consecutively to tie the NCAA single-game second best performance. Later on May 2, she hit her 50th career home run (all in only two seasons with the Cajuns) off Melanie Coyne of the ULM Warhawks.

For a final year, Elkins earned First Team honors from the NFCA, the conference and for a third straight year was crowned "Player of The Year," a rare feat. She broke and set her own school and conference records in batting average, on-base percentage and slugging (all career bests), while the home runs were top-5 all-time for the school. Elkins led the conference and ranked top-5 in all the same categories for the NCAA.

On February 26, 2016, Elkins captured her 200th career RBI on a first-inning home run to defeat the Rutgers Scarlet Knights. Despite missing a month of games with an injury, Elkins and the Cajuns made the NCAA tournament and advanced to the Super Regionals where they were eventually eliminated on May 27. Ending on a career-high 13-consecutive-game hit streak (.461 18/39, 11 RBIs, three home runs, 5 doubles, 9 walks, slugging .820% and fanning just once), Elkins went (2/4) in her final appearance against the Oklahoma Sooners.

Elkins would leave Lafayette with the career crown in average, slugging and ranking top-5 in home runs for her three years. For the Sun Belt, Elkins leads in average (.430) and slugging (.989%), while standing top-10 in home runs (75) and RBIs (206). In all of the NCAA, she ranks in slugging percentage (8th).

=== Professional ===
Elkins was selected first overall by the Pennsylvania Rebellion in the 2016 NPF Draft on April 16, 2016. In her first professional at-bat, she hit a home run in a 15–1 win. In the 2017 off-season, she was picked up as a free agent by the Chicago Bandits. She announced her retirement from the National Pro Fastpitch on March 25, 2017.

== Coaching career ==
=== Mississippi State (Volunteer assistant) ===
On August 16, 2018, Elkins was announced as a volunteer assistant coach of the Mississippi State softball program where she served for one season.

=== Houston (asst.) ===
On July 17, 2019, Elkins was announced as assistant coach of the Houston softball program where she served for two seasons.

=== Episcopal HS (Asst.) ===
Elkins spent the spring of 2022 as the assistant coach of the Bellaire, Texas Episcopal High School where they captured a state championship.

== Statistics ==
=== Texas Tech Red Raiders & Louisiana Ragin' Cajuns ===
YEAR	G	AB	R	H	BA	RBI	HR	3B	2B	TB	SLG	BB	SO	SB	SBA
2013	47	116	18	33	.284	21	0	0	8	41	.353%	17	7	0	0
2014	59	188	41	73	.388	74	24	0	12	157	.835%	40	10	1	1
2015	54	155	44	66	.426	83	32	0	5	167	1.077%	38	10	1	2
2016	37	108	43	55	.509	49	19	0	10	122	1.129%	28	3	1	1
TOTALS	197	567	146	227	.400	227	75	0	35	487	.859%	123	30	3	4

== See also ==
- NCAA Division I softball career .400 batting average list
- NCAA Division I softball career 200 RBIs list
- NCAA Division I softball career 50 home runs list
