= 1986 NCAA Division II baseball tournament =

- Season: 1986
- Finals site: Paterson Field; Montgomery, Alabama
- Champions: Troy State (1st title)
- Runner-up: Columbus (GA) (1st CWS Appearance)
- Winning coach: Chase Riddle (1st title)
- MOP: Wendell Stephens (3B) (Troy State)
- Attendance: 24,853

The 1986 NCAA Division II baseball tournament was the postseason tournament hosted by the NCAA to determine the national champion of baseball among its Division II colleges and universities at the end of the 1986 NCAA Division II baseball season.

For the second year, the tournament was played at Paterson Field in Montgomery, Alabama.

Troy State defeated Columbus (GA), 5–0, in the double-elimination final, the Trojans' first Division II national title. Troy State was coached by Chase Riddle.

== Bracket ==
=== College World Series ===
First Round
Sacramento State	14
Tampa	12
Mankato State	6
Troy State	8
Columbus (GA)	7
New Haven	11

Second Round
Sacramento State	5
Columbus (GA)	6
Tampa	2
Mankato State	6
Troy State	7
New Haven	5
Sacramento State	9
New Haven	4

Semifinals
Columbus (GA)	14
Mankato State	12
Troy State	9
Sacramento State	1

Championship
Columbus (GA)	0
Troy State	5

== See also ==
- 1986 NCAA Division I baseball tournament
- 1986 NCAA Division III baseball tournament
- 1986 NAIA World Series
- 1986 NCAA Division II softball tournament
