= Kaitlin Cochran =

American softball player

Personal information
- Full name: Kaitlin Elizabeth Cochran
- Born: February 28, 1987 (age 39) Riverside, California, U.S.
- Height: 5 ft 9 in (175 cm)

Sport
- Country: USA
- Sport: Softball
- College team: Arizona State Sun Devils
Medal record
Women's softball
Representing United States
Pan American Games
Gold medal – first place	2011 Guadalajara	Team

Kaitlin Elizabeth Cochran (born February 28, 1987) is an American, former collegiate four-time first team All-American, retired softball player. She attended Rosary High School and Arizona State University from 2006 to 2009, where she won the 2008 Women's College World Series title. Also with United States women's national softball team, she won four World Cup of Softball crowns. She holds various records for the Sun Devils in the Pac-12 Conference. She was drafted first overall in the National Pro Fastpitch but elected not to play. She is also one of nine NCAA Division I players to bat .400 with 200 RBIs, 50 home runs and an .800 slugging percentage for a career.

== Arizona State ==
=== 2006 ===
Cochran began her career by being named Pac-10 Newcomer of the Year, as well as earning First Team selections from both the conference and the National Fastpitch Coaches Association. Cochran debuted on February 9 in a run-rule victory vs. the Utah State Aggies, where she went 1/4 with an RBI. She broke school season records in hits, batting average, home runs and RBIs, all except the RBIs led the Pac-10. On February 10, Cochran drove in 7 runs against the Syracuse Orange for a single game career high.

=== 2007 ===
Cochran repeated all-season honors, including a Pac-10 Player of the Year award She was also a finalist for USA National Collegiate Player of The Year. Cochran broke her own season records for batting average, hits (both career bests) and home runs, as well as setting the slugging percentage record. She simultaneously led the conference in hits, doubles, base on balls, slugging and average, the latter of which also was tops for the NCAA year. Cochran still owns the season records for average, hits and slugging for the Sun Devils.

=== 2008 ===
The Sun Devil again achieved all-season honors from the conference and the NFCA. She set new records for doubles, runs and walks, including intentional walks. Of those records, she led the conference in all and except the doubles, she also led the NCAA; the intentional walks was an all-time season record for the NCAA and her runs ranks top-10. Her season batting average (best in the conference), home runs, RBIs and hits rank top-10 in school history.

Cochran and the Sun Devils made their third consecutive trip to the Women's College World Series and were a perfect 5-0 en route to the title. In their first two games, Cochran was walked all 6 plate appearances and went a combined (3/8) with 8 walks to hit a total of .375 at the series. In the championship finale vs. the Texas A&M Aggies on June 3, her only hit was a three-run home run.

=== 2009 ===
For her final season, Cochran maintained her awards pace with her last First Team selections and third "Player of The Year" honors; she became the third player in the conference to achieve the honor for three seasons. Once again, she was a finalist for USA National Collegiate Player of The Year as she had been in 2007. She set her last set of records by breaking her own season home runs and on-base percentage with career highs. The percentage led both the Pac-10 (where she also led in walks) and the NCAA.

Cochran also set several single game records, starting by claiming her 50th career home run vs. Magon Paul of the UCF Golden Knights on February 6. A week later on February 13 against the Chattanooga Mocs, she set a career best with 5 walks. On March 20, Cochran batted in her 200th career RBI in a win over the Long Beach State 49ers. It was also during this time that Cochran went on her career best 13 consecutive game hitting streak, beginning on March 15 and ending in a rain postponed game vs. the Arizona Wildcats on April 11. Cochran hit .444 (16/36) with 20 RBIs, 8 HRs (including a top NCAA Division I streak of 7 consecutive home run games), 3 doubles 15 walks and slugging 1.194%. Although the Sun Devils made a return trip to the World Series as defending champs, they eventually lost to end Cochran's career on May 30, with Cochran getting shutout at the plate.

She holds the Sun Devil crown in career batting average, home runs, hits, runs, walks, total bases and slugging percentage. She ranks top-5 in RBIs, doubles, triples and stolen bases. She is top-10 in the now named Pac-12 conference for average, home runs, runs, walks and slugging. Finally, in the NCAA Division I, she is top-10 in walks and runs (6th), total bases (7th) and slugging (9th) for her career.

== Post-Arizona State ==
As a collegiate senior, Cochran was drafted No. 1 by the Akron Racers but elected not play. In the four years after graduating, Cochran played for Team USA and won four consecutive World Cups, along with the 2010 ISF World Championship and the 2011 Pan-American Championship. Although with incomplete numbers, Cochran hit over .300 for her Team USA career.

Cochran eventually married her husband Matthew Johnson.

== Statistics ==
Arizona State
YEAR	G	AB	R	H	BA	RBI	HR	3B	2B	TB	SLG	BB	SO	SB	SBA
2006	68	190	47	83	.437	61	17	4	8	150	.789%	38	25	12	17
2007	71	187	72	92	.492	59	18	2	16	166	.887%	59	14	27	31
2008	71	173	86	76	.439	51	14	4	19	145	.838%	74	15	11	14
2009	66	156	69	64	.410	59	20	0	11	135	.865%	64	24	17	17
TOTALS	276	706	274	315	.446	230	69	10	54	596	.844%	235	78	67	79

Team USA
YEAR	AB	R	H	BA	RBI	HR	3B	2B	TB	SLG	BB	SO	SB
2009	13	4	5	.384	2	0	1	1	8	.615%	4	1	0
2010	35	13	12	.343	6	3	2	0	25	.714%	6	4	3
2011	26	9	9	.346	4	0	3	0	15	.577%	7	3	2
2012	42	12	11	.262	4	0	0	2	13	.309%	5	9	1
TOTALS	116	38	37	.319	16	3	6	3	61	.526%	22	17	6

== Links ==
- NCAA Division I softball career .400 batting average list
- NCAA Division I softball career 200 RBIs list
- NCAA Division I softball career 50 home runs list
