= 1986 NCAA Division II softball tournament =

- Format: Double-elimination tournament
- Finals site: Akron, Ohio
- Champions: Stephen F. Austin (1st title)
- Runner-up: Cal State Northridge (5th title game)
- Winning coach: Dianne Baker (1st title)
- Attendance: 2,612

The 1986 NCAA Division II softball tournament was the fifth annual postseason tournament hosted by the NCAA to determine the national champion of softball among its Division II members in the United States, held at the end of the 1986 NCAA Division II softball season.

The final, four-team double elimination tournament, also known as the Division II Women's College World Series, was played at Akron University in Akron, Ohio.

Stephen F. Austin defeated three-time defending champions Cal State Northridge in a one-game championship series (1–0) to capture the Lady Jacks' first Division II national title.

== Bracket ==
=== Finals ===
First Round
Bloomsburg	1
NE Missouri State	0
Winner's bracket
Stephen F. Austin	2
Cal State Northridge	0
NE Missouri State	1
Cal State Northridge	2
Loser's bracket

Semifinals
Bloomsburg	1
Stephen F. Austin	3
Bloomsburg	4
Cal State Northridge	5

Championship
Stephen F. Austin	1
Cal State Northridge	0

== All-tournament team ==
- Kelly Winn, 1B, Cal State Northridge
- Karen Hertzler, 2B, Bloomsburg
- Lori Shelly, SS, Cal State Northridge
- Barb Flynn, 3B, Cal State Northridge
- Stella Castro, OF, Stephen F. Austin
- Suzanne Luna, OF, Bloomsburg
- Liz Chavez, OF, Northeast Missouri State
- Kathy Slaten, P, Cal State Northridge
- Pam Clay, P, Stephen F. Austin
- Penni Lewis, C, Stephen F. Austin
- Jean Millen, UT, Bloomsburg
- Nancy Lucero, UT, Cal State Northridge

== See also ==
- 1986 NCAA Division I softball tournament
- 1986 NCAA Division III softball tournament
- 1986 NAIA softball tournament
- 1986 NCAA Division II baseball tournament
