= 1994 NCAA Division I softball tournament =

- Teams: 32
- Finals site: ASA Hall of Fame Stadium; Oklahoma City, Oklahoma
- Champions: Arizona (3rd title)
- Runner-up: Cal State Northridge (2nd WCWS Appearance)
- Winning coach: Mike Candrea (3rd title)

The 1994 NCAA Division I softball tournament was the thirteenth annual tournament to determine the national champion of NCAA women's collegiate softball. Held during May 1994, thirty-two Division I college softball teams contested the championship. The tournament featured eight regionals of four teams, each in a double elimination format. The 1994 Women's College World Series was held in Oklahoma City, Oklahoma from May 26 through May 30 and marked the conclusion of the 1994 NCAA Division I softball season. Arizona won their third championship, and second consecutive, by defeating Cal State Northridge 4–0 in the final game. It was the first final game since 1986 to not feature UCLA.

== Regionals ==
=== Regional No. 1 ===
First Round
UIC	5^{8}
DePaul	4
Notre Dame	3^{8}
Indiana	0
Lower round 1
DePaul	4
Indiana	6

Semi-Finals
UIC	1^{12}
Notre Dame	0
Lower final
Notre Dame	0
Indiana	8^{5}

Finals
UIC	2	7
Indiana	4	3

- UIC qualifies for WCWS

=== Regional No. 2 ===
First Round
UNLV	2^{8}
South Carolina	1
UCLA	2
Georgia State	1
Lower round 1
South Carolina	6
Georgia State	1

Semi-Finals
UNLV	1^{9}
UCLA	0
Lower final
UCLA	3
South Carolina	1

Finals
UNLV	1	2
UCLA	2^{8}	3

- UCLA qualifies for WCWS

=== Regional No. 3 ===
First Round
Cal State Fullerton	2
Washington	1
Cal State Northridge	8^{5}
Maine	0
Lower round 1
Washington	10^{6}
Maine	0

Semi-Finals
Cal State Fullerton	0
Cal State Northridge	9^{5}
Lower final
Cal State Fullerton	4
Washington	0

Finals
Cal State Northridge	0	4
Cal State Fullerton	2	0

- Cal State Northridge qualifies for WCWS

=== Regional No. 4 ===
First Round
Utah	1^{10}
Princeton	0
Southwestern Louisiana	3
McNeese State	0
Lower round 1
Princeton	2
McNeese State	0

Semi-Finals
Utah	0
Southwestern Louisiana	1^{9}
Lower final
Utah	2
Princeton	1

Finals
Southwestern Louisiana	2	0
Utah	3^{8}	2

- Utah qualifies for WCWS

=== Regional No. 5 ===
First Round
Missouri	1
Kansas	0
Hawaii	1
Drake	0
Lower round 1
Kansas	3
Drake	0

Semi-Finals
Missouri	1
Hawaii	2
Lower final
Missouri	1
Kansas	0

Finals
Hawaii	1	1
Missouri	3^{13}	2^{8}

- Missouri qualifies for WCWS

=== Regional No. 6 ===
First Round
Oregon	3
California	2
Fresno State	3
Central Michigan	0
Lower round 1
California	8^{6}
Central Michigan	0

Semi-Finals
Oregon	0
Fresno State	1
Lower final
Oregon	2^{20}
California	1

Finals
Fresno State	5	—
Oregon	0	—

- Fresno State qualifies for WCWS

=== Regional No. 7 ===
First Round
Oklahoma	3
Florida State	1
Oklahoma State	1
Providence	0
Lower round 1
Florida State	0
Providence	4

Semi-Finals
Oklahoma	3
Oklahoma State	4
Lower final
Oklahoma	4
Providence	1

Finals
Oklahoma State	2	—
Oklahoma	1	—

- Oklahoma State qualifies for WCWS

=== Regional No. 8 ===
First Round
Texas A&M	6
Rutgers	2
Arizona	7
Canisius	0
Lower round 1
Rutgers	3
Canisius	4^{9}

Semi-Finals
Texas A&M	0
Arizona	5
Lower final
Texas A&M	9
Canisius	0

Finals
Arizona	6	—
Texas A&M	0	—

- Arizona qualifies for WCWS

== Women's College World Series ==
=== Participants ===
1. Arizona
2. Cal State Northridge
3. Oklahoma State
4. UCLA
5. Fresno State
6. Utah
7. Missouri
8. UIC

=== Bracket ===
First round
1	Arizona	8
8	UIC	0 ^{5}
4	UCLA	0
5	Fresno State	1
8	UIC	0 ^{5}
4	UCLA	9
3	Oklahoma State	0 ^{8}
6	Utah	2
7	Missouri	3
2	Cal State Northridge	5
3	Oklahoma State	7
7	Missouri	3

Second round
1	Arizona	3
5	Fresno State	0
4	UCLA	11
6	Utah	1
6	Utah	1
2	Cal State Northridge	5
3	Oklahoma State	2
5	Fresno State	0

Semifinals
1	Arizona	5	—
4	UCLA	2	—
2	Cal State Northridge	2 ^{15}	4
3	Oklahoma State	3	2

Finals
1	Arizona	4
2	Cal State Northridge	0

=== Championship Game ===
School	Top Batter	Stats.
Arizona	Laura Espinoza (SS) & Leah Braatz (C)	1-3 RBI K
Cal State Northridge	Beth Calcante (LF)	1-3 2B 2Ks

School	Pitcher	IP	H	R	ER	BB	SO	AB	BF
Arizona	Susie Parra (W)	7.0	1	0	0	1	13	22	23
Cal State Northridge	Jennifer Richardson (L)	4.0	7	4	4	0	3	19	21
Cal State Northridge	Amy Windmiller	2.0	0	0	0	0	3	6	6

=== All-Tournament Team ===
The following players were named to the All-Tournament Team

Pos	Name	School
P	Susie Parra	Arizona
P	Amy Day	Oklahoma State
C	Leah Braatz	Arizona
1B	Amy Chellevold	Arizona
2B	Jenny Dalton	Arizona
3B	Shannon Jones	Cal State Northridge
SS	April Austin	Oklahoma State
OF	Leah O'Brien	Arizona
OF	Jen Fleming	Cal State Northridge
OF	Beth Calcante	Cal State Northridge
AL	Ginny Mike	UCLA
AL	Kim Ward	Oklahoma State

== See also ==
- 1994 NCAA Division II softball tournament
- 1994 NCAA Division III softball tournament
- 1994 NAIA softball tournament
- 1994 NCAA Division I baseball tournament
