= 1986 NCAA Division III baseball tournament =

- Season: 1986
- Teams: 24
- Finals site: Pioneer Park; Marietta, Ohio
- Champions: Marietta (3rd title)
- Runner-up: Ithaca

The 1986 NCAA Division III baseball tournament was played at the end of the 1986 NCAA Division III baseball season to determine the 11th national champion of college baseball at the NCAA Division III level. The tournament concluded with six teams competing at Pioneer Park in Marietta, Ohio, for the championship. Six regional tournaments were held to determine the participants in the World Series. Regional tournaments were contested in double-elimination format, with one region consisting of six teams, four regions consisting of four teams, and one region consisting of two teams, which was played as best-of-five, for a total of 24 teams participating in the tournament. The tournament champion was Marietta, who defeated Ithaca for the championship.

== See also ==
- 1986 NCAA Division I baseball tournament
- 1986 NCAA Division II baseball tournament
- 1986 NCAA Division III softball tournament
- 1986 NAIA World Series
