= Matador Diamond =

Stadium in Northridge, California, US

Coordinates: 34.244241°N 118.525032°W

- Interactive map of Matador Diamond
- Location: Northridge, California
- Owner: California State University, Northridge
- Capacity: 500

Construction
- Opened: 1982

Tenant
- Cal State Northridge Matadors softball (NCAA)

Matador Diamond is the home field of the Cal State Northridge Matadors softball team of California State University, Northridge. The stadium is located in the middle of the athletic complex along Zelzah Avenue, between Matador Field and Matador Tennis Complex. The venue has a seating capacity of 500, with standing room allowing up to 1,000 total fans.
