= Jessie Harper =

American softball player

Personal information
- Born: Stevenson Ranch, California, U.S.

Sport
- Country: USA
- Sport: Softball
- College team: Arizona

Jessica "Jessie" Ireland Harper (born May 24, 1998) is an American, former collegiate All-American, softball player. Harper played college softball for Arizona from 2017 to 2021 at the shortstop position and co-holds the career home runs record for the school and conference with former teammate Katiyana Mauga. Harper is a four-time first-team all-conference honoree and also ranks second all-time for homers in the NCAA Division I. Harper redshirted her senior year in 2020 after the college season was cancelled due to the COVID-19 pandemic and returned to play in 2021. Harper was selected No. 6 in the Athletes Unlimited Softball draft.

== College ==
Harper debuted on February 9 in a win against the Fordham Rams, tallying a hit. She would earn First Team selections for both the Pac-12 and the NCAA. In 2018, she repeated conference honors and led the Wildcats in hits, RBIs and doubles.

For her junior season, Harper posted a career best 9 game hit streak from February 8–17, hitting .428 (12/28) with 9 RBIs, three home runs, two doubles, two walks, 9 runs and a slugging percentage of 0.821%. Later on March 5, she hit her career 50th home run off Samaria Diaz of the New Mexico State Aggies. During the NCAA tournament, Harper connected for three homers against the Auburn Tigers on May 19 to tie the school record and is additionally an NCAA single game record; this game also marked a highlight with 5 hits to also set a personal best. The Wildcats opened an appearance at the 2019 Women's College World Series against the Washington Huskies with Harper hitting her final season home run to help get the win, it was her only hit of the series. This also cemented her atop of the season list for the NCAA for that statistic and helped her earn First Team status again for the NCAA and conference.

To open the 2020 season, Harper set a career high with three walks in a victory over the Kansas Jayhawks on February 7. The next month on March 6, she drove in her 200th career RBI on another home run to open another eventual victory against the South Dakota Coyotes. This would make her the tenth hitter for the Wildcats to enter both the 50 homer and 200 RBI lists. The season was cancelled due to the COVID-19 pandemic, with Harper making her last appearance on March 10 against Saint Joseph's Hawks, collecting a hit and two RBIs. Harper's 10 home runs for the year tied her fourth overall for the school, 6th in the conference and 10th for the NCAA career all-time lists. She later was granted a redshirt and elected to return for the 2021 season.

For her redshirt senior season, Harper earned her fourth First Team conference citation and third NFCA All-American honor. On March 10, Harper set a career best with six RBIs driven in against the FAMU Rattlers, launching two home runs. Harper would also match her career best 9 game hit streak twice during the season. During an appearance during the 2021 Women's College World Series, she hit her 92nd career home run off Montana Fouts in a loss to the Alabama Crimson Tide on June 3 to own a share of the career record. Harper made her final collegiate appearance on June 5 vs. the Florida State Seminoles and collected a hit and a walk.

== Statistics ==
Arizona Wildcats
YEAR	G	AB	R	H	BA	RBI	HR	3B	2B	TB	SLG	BB	SO	SB	SBA
2017	61	186	34	62	.333	56	19	1	13	134	.720%	9	22	0	0
2018	59	194	39	66	.340	51	18	2	14	138	.711%	9	28	1	1
2019	62	204	65	68	.333	70	29	1	9	166	.813%	20	27	1	1
2020	25	76	25	30	.394	29	10	0	3	63	.829%	13	6	0	0
2021	56	171	43	56	.327	49	16	1	11	117	.684%	19	35	1	1
TOTALS	263	831	206	282	.339	255	92	5	50	618	.743%	70	118	3	3

=== Athletes Unlimited ===
YEAR	G	AB	R	H	BA	RBI	HR	3B	2B	TB	SLG	BB	SO	SB
2021	8	19	2	7	.368	1	0	0	0	7	.368%	1	7	0
