= Jenny Dalton-Hill =

American softball player

Jenny Dalton
- Second base
- Born: March 5, 1974 (age 52); Glendale, California, U.S.
- Bats: Right Throws: Right

Teams
- Arizona Wildcats (1993–1996)

Career highlights and awards
- Honda Sports Award (1996); Pac-12 Player of the Year (1996); WCWS Most Outstanding Player (1996)

Jenny Dalton-Hill
Medal record

Women's baseball

Representing United States

Women's Baseball World Cup
| Bronze medal – third place | 2010 Venezuela | 2010 Tournament |

Jenny Dalton-Hill (born March 5, 1974) is an American former collegiate All-American softball player and current sports commentator and general manager for the Chicago Bandits for the inaugural 2025 season of the Athletes Unlimited Softball League (AUSL). She played for the Arizona Wildcats from 1993 to 1996 where she won three Women's College World Series championships (1993, 1994, 1996). Having also played baseball, Dalton-Hill is a former member of the Colorado Silver Bullets and United States women's national baseball team, earning a bronze medal at the 2010 Women's Baseball World Cup. She holds the career Pac-12 and NCAA Division I records in RBIs. She is the first and one of nine NCAA players to hit .400 with 200 RBIs, 50 home runs and an .800 slugging percentage in her career.

== Career ==
=== Arizona Wildcats ===
Dalton-Hill began her career in 1993 as an All-Pac-10 conference selection with a .318 batting average for her freshman year. That season the Wildcats made the WCWS and Dalton got a hit in her first at-bat at the tournament, helping defeat the ULL Ragin’ Cajuns on May 29. When the team made the finals vs. rival the UCLA Bruins, Dalton earned her first national championship (the school's second overall) on May 31, despite being shut out at the plate by Lisa Fernandez with only a base on balls to her credit.

In her sophomore season, Dalton-Hill was named First Team All-Pac-10 and All-American. She posted the second-best RBIs and doubles (led the conference) totals in school history; both still rank top-10. Her RBI total was also second all-time for an NCAA season and is still a top-10 record. Her walks total also led the conference and she had a career-best 89 hits.

Returning to the WCWS for a second series, Dalton-Hill started the tournament by driving in two runs to help best the UIC Flames on May 26. The next game vs. the Fresno State Bulldogs she was perfect at the plate (3/3). Against rival UCLA in the semifinals, she hit a three-run home run and had two walks on May 29 to reach the championship. Dalton-Hill and teammates won the title 4-0 over the Cal State Northridge Matadors on May 30. Dalton-Hill had an RBI but again was shut out at the plate. She still eas named to the All-Tournament Team for her .625 (5/8), 5 RBIs, home run and three walks effort.

Dalton-Hill again achieved First-Team All-Pac-10 and All-American honors. She broke school season records for walks and runs scored. The walks too led the conference and both stats led the NCAA for the year. Dalton-Hill remains the season standard for school, conference and NCAA runs scored all-time. Her home runs (career best) and RBI totals were and are top-5 school and top-10 NCAA season records.

February 18, 1995, Dalton-Hill hit three home runs vs. the Illinois State Redbirds to tie the school and then NCAA single game record. Later that year on April 28 she performed the feat again over the Oregon State Beavers to become the first player with multiple three-home-run games and the only one to do it in the same year. Prior to the NCAA tournament, Dalton-Hill also became just the second player, after teammate Laura Espinoza, to cross both the 50-home-run and 200 RBIs benchmark. She was also the first of select players to make the RBI club in only three seasons.

At the WCWS in the Wildcats' game two, she hit a three-run homer to beat the Cal State Fullerton Titans on May 26 and moved to the semifinals where she drove in the eventual game-winning run in the first inning vs. the UNLV Rebels on May 28. In the finale, the Wildcats lost 4–2 on May 29 vs. UCLA Bruins and Dalton-Hill again suffered a batting shutout. The title was later vacated by the NCAA for rules violation.

For her final season, Dalton-Hill earned her third consecutive First Team conference and NCAA citations. In addition, she was named Pac-10 Player of the Year and became the first player to hold the Triple Crown of the best average, RBIs (both were career highs) and home run totals in a single season for the conference. Dalton-Hill also earned the Honda Sports Award for "Softball Player of The Year." The Wildcat broke the school record for walks and continues to hold the distinction. Her season average, RBIs, home runs and career-best slugging percentage were and are top-10 school records. Along with her Triple Crown, she also led the NCAA in RBIs, home runs, walks and runs scored. Finally, the RBIs (second best), home runs and runs scored were and are top-10 all-time NCAA season records.

On March 1, 1996, Dalton-Hill tallied 8 RBIs in a single game vs. the Tennessee Lady Vols for a career high. She drove in her 316th career RBI in grand slam fashion off Shawn Starling of the Troy Trojans on May 17, eclipsing former teammate Laura Espinoza for the record.

On May 26 at the WCWS, Dalton-Hill was perfect (3/3) with two RBIs vs. Iowa Hawkeyes. Making her fourth finals appearance in a row on May 27, Dalton-Hill broke through her slump by hitting a three-run home run in the first inning to eventually best the Washington Huskies 6–4 for her third championship. She was later named All-Tournament and MVP of the series.

When she left the Arizona Wildcats, she was the leader in career RBIs, walks and runs. She placed second in average, hits, home runs, doubles and slugging, those each now rank top-10 all-time, except the hits. Dalton-Hill also held every career crown in the now Pac-12 that she did for Arizona, of which she still does for the RBIs and runs. She now sits in the top-10 for every conference career offense category that she is not atop, excluding hits and doubles. For the NCAA career records, Dalton-Hill again led in RBIs, walks, runs scored and slugging percentage, as well as the second-most home runs behind teammate Laura Espinoza. She still claims the most RBIs and ranks top-10 in runs (2nd) and home runs (tied 10th) all-time.

=== Baseball ===
In 1996, she played for the Colorado Silver Bullets in what would prove to be their final season. Competing at the 2010 Women's World Cup of Baseball, she shared duties at first base with former Arizona teammate Laura Espinoza. In 2012, Dalton served as a coach for the United States national women's team.

== Athletes Unlimited ==
In November 2024, Athletes Unlimited hired Dalton-Hill as the general manager for team Bandits in their inaugural season of the Athletes Unlimited Softball League (AUSL).

== Personal life ==
Dalton-Hill was eligible to play for Team USA in the 1996 Olympics but opted to pursue other endeavors. She volunteered to coach for the University of Arizona in 1997 where they won their 5th national title. She would later relocate and join the Kentucky Wildcats program for two years as an Assistant Coach.

In 2001, Dalton-Hill was inducted into the Wildcats Hall of Fame. As she had been a member of the baseball Colorado Silver Bullets in 1997, Dalton reemerged from retirement in 2010 to partake in the USA Baseball Women's National Team who won the bronze at the 2010 Women's Baseball World Cup. She currently coaches high school softball in Kentucky, is a staff member of women's Team USA baseball and is incumbent on the USA Board of Directors for softball.

Dalton-Hill is married to Marc Hill and has three children, Dalton, Brookelyn and Cogan. When Glendale High School (Dalton's alma mater) built their softball field in 2005, they named it Dalton Field in her honor. They also retired her number.

She is also a member of the Church of Jesus Christ of Latter-day Saints (LDS Church). Dalton-Hill frequently offers color commentary for the NCAA Division I Softball Tournament and 7 Innings Podcast.

== Statistics ==
University of Arizona
| YEAR | G | AB | R | H | BA | RBI | HR | 3B | 2B | TB | SLG | BB | SO | SB | SBA |
| 1993 | 45 | 113 | 34 | 36 | .318 | 30 | 7 | 0 | 8 | 65 | .575% | 20 | 17 | 12 | 12 |
| 1994 | 67 | 205 | 74 | 89 | .434 | 91 | 16 | 1 | 18 | 157 | .766% | 35 | 14 | 13 | 13 |
| 1995 | 72 | 210 | 101 | 82 | .390 | 98 | 28 | 1 | 13 | 181 | .862% | 59 | 23 | 8 | 10 |
| 1996 | 67 | 179 | 84 | 84 | .469 | 109 | 25 | 1 | 12 | 173 | .966% | 64 | 11 | 19 | 20 |
| TOTALS | 251 | 707 | 293 | 291 | .411 | 328 | 76 | 3 | 51 | 576 | .814% | 178 | 65 | 52 | 55 |

== Awards and honors ==
- 1996 Medal of Honor (Pac-10)
- 1996 Honda Sports Award (softball)
- 2016 All-Century Softball Team (Pac-12)
- 2022 Inducted into the Little League Hall of Excellence

== See also ==
- NCAA Division I softball career .400 batting average list
- NCAA Division I softball career 200 RBIs list
- NCAA Division I softball career 50 home runs list
