= Cal State Northridge Matadors softball =

Cal State Northridge Matadors
- Founded: 1977
- University: California State University, Northridge
- Athletic director: Ryan Swartwood
- Head coach: Jodie Cox (1st season)
- Conference: Big West
- Location: Northridge, California
- Home stadium: Matador Diamond (Capacity: 1,000)
- Nickname: Matadors
- Colors: Red, white, and black

NCAA WCWS runner-up
- 1994

NCAA WCWS appearances
- 1993

NCAA Tournament appearances
- 1993, 1994, 1995, 1996, 1997, 1998, 1999, 2000, 2001, 2003, 2004, 2007, 2015

Regular-season conference championships
- WAC: 1993, 1994, 1995; Big West: 1998, 2010, 2015

The Cal State Northridge Matadors softball team represents California State University, Northridge in NCAA Division I college softball. They compete as part of the Big West Conference and play home games at Matador Diamond. The team is currently led by head coach Jodie Cox, who will lead her first season in 2026.

== History ==
The Matadors appeared in the AIAW Women's College World Series at the Division II level in 1981. During their nine year tenure in NCAA Division II, they appeared in eight Women's College World Series, claiming four national championships and finishing second three other years. After completing their transition to Division I, they appeared in two consecutive Women's College World Series, finishing second in 1994. They won the Western Athletic Conference three of their four years in the league, and have claimed four titles since joining the Big West in 1997. They won their last conference title in 2015.

== See also ==
- List of NCAA Division I softball programs
