= List of NCAA Division I softball home run leaders =

Jocelyn Alo holds the NCAA Division I softball home run record with 122. She passed Lauren Chamberlain, who hit 95, on March 11, 2022.

== List of home run leaders ==
Key
**Bold**	Active player

Rank	Player	HR	Team(s)	Years	Ref
1	Jocelyn Alo	122	Oklahoma	2018–2022	
2	Karli Spaid	103	Miami	2021–2024	
3	Tiare Jennings	98	Oklahoma	2021–2024	
4	Lauren Chamberlain	95	Oklahoma	2012–2015	
5	Addison Barnard	93	Wichita State	2021–2024	
6	Mia Davidson	92	Mississippi State	2018–2022	
6	Jessie Harper	92	Arizona	2017–2021	
6	Katiyana Mauga	92	Arizona	2014–2017	
9	Megan Grant	91	UCLA	2023–2026	
10	Stacey Nuveman	90	UCLA	1997–2002	
11	Stacie Chambers	87	Arizona	2008–2011	
12	Leah Braatz	85	Arizona	1994–1998	
12	Laura Espinoza	85	Arizona	1992–1995	
14	Shelby Pendley	84	Arizona	2012–2015	
14	Shelby Pendley	84	Oklahoma	2012–2015	
15	Danyele Gomez	83	Louisiana	2003–2006	
15	Jessica Warren	83	Florida State	2015–2018	
17	Sierra Romero	82	Michigan	2013–2016	
18	Kristen Rivera	79	Washington	2002–2005	
19	Megan Baltzell	76	Longwood	2012–2015	
19	Jenny Dalton	76	Arizona	1993–1996	
21	Lexie Elkins	75	Texas Tech	2013–2016	
21	Lexie Elkins	75	Louisiana	2013–2016	
21	Jennifer Gilbert	75	Ball State	2011–2014	
21	Morgan Noad	75	Coastal Carolina	2013–2016	
21	Erika Piancastelli	75	McNeese	2015–2018	
26	Bri Ellis	74	Auburn	2022–2025	
26	Bri Ellis	74	Arkansas	2022–2025	
27	Jaime Clark	73	Washington	2000–2003	
27	Jenna Cone	73	George Washington	2017–2021	
29	Kelsey Horton	72	New Mexico State	2016–2019	
29	Kelly Majam	72	Hawaii	2010–2013	

== Records & Milestones ==
Laura Espinoza hit an NCAA all-time season and senior class record 37 home runs in 1995; Lexie Elkins is the only player to make the list without hitting a single home run in a full season of play, which came in her freshman year in 2013. Elkins holds the junior class record by hitting 32 in 2015. Addison Barnard set the sophomore record by hitting 33 in 2022. Jocelyn Alo (30 in 2018, 34 in 2021 and 34 in 2022) is the only player to hit 30 home runs in three different seasons. Espinoza (30 in 1994 and 37 in 1995), Lauren Chamberlain (30 in 2012 and 30 in 2013) and Alo are the only players with two 30-homer seasons. Kendall Wells of Oklahoma hit her 34th home run of the season April 19, 2026, against Georgia, to extend her record for most by a freshman.

Katiyana Mauga is the only player in NCAA history to have 20 or more home runs every year of her career. Christi Orgeron set a season record when 6 of her 22 went for grand slams in 2012; Haley Outon, Taylor Edwards and Stephanie Best each hit a record two grand slams in a single game, Best's both coming in the same inning. From March 20 to April 2, 2009, Kaitlin Cochran hit 7 homers in 7 consecutive games, another NCAA record. Jenny Dalton is one of the numerous players from the list to achieve a three-homer game (second best), one of the elite to do it twice and is the only player to do it in the same year of 1995; Jenna Cone and Suzy Brookshire each achieved the feat once in 2021. Jen Yee's 29 home runs in 2009 helped her to an all-time season record 1.270 slugging percentage. Veronica Nelson was walked 108 times in 2002 while hitting 9 homers for another all-time NCAA season record.

Along with Espinoza in 1995, Chambers in 2009, Nuveman in 1999, Majam in 2010 and Alo (in 2018 and 34 in 2021), Elkins (32 in 2015 and 24 in 2014), Camilla Carrera (32 in 2012), Megan Baltzell (30 in 2013 and 27 in 2015), Danyele Gomez (30 in 2006), DJ Sanders (29 in 2017), Jessie Harper (29 in 2019), Angeline Quiocho (28 in 2010), Dalton (28 in 1995 and 25 in 1996), Best (26 in 2005), Mia Davidson (26 in 2019), Bailey Hemphill (26 in 2019), Kelsey Horton (25 in 2018), Katiyana Mauga (26 in 2015 and 25 in 2017), Alex Hugo (25 in 2014), Kristen Rivera (25 in 2003), Leah Braatz (25 in 1998), Kelly Kretschman (25 in 1998) all rank in the top 10 for single-season home runs. Espinoza in 1994 and 1995, Chambers in 2009, Nuveman in 1999, Majam in 2010, Elkins in 2015, Carrera in 2012, Baltzell in 2013, Gomez in 2006, Best in 2005, Hugo in 2014, Rivera in 2003, Braatz in 1998 and (21 in 1997), Kretschman in 1998, Dalton in 1996, Nohara in 2011, Benyi in 2004, Topping in 2000, Morgan Noad and Tina Iosefa (both with 23 in 2016), Sanders in 2017, Alo in 2018 and 2021, Harper in 2019 were all tops for those respective NCAA years.[233]

Finally, with Nuveman in 1999, Nelson in 2002, Chamberlain in 2013, Espinoza in 1994 and (12 in 1993), Dalton in 1996, (7 in 1993 and 16 in 1994), Benyi in 2004 and (8 in 2003), Leticia Pineda (14 in 1996 and 16 in 1997), Jennie Finch (11 in 2001), Mackenzie Vandergeest (20 in 2011), Tairia Flowers (22 in 2003), Claire Sua (17 in 2003 and 10 in 2004), Samantha Findlay (21 in 2005), Jenae Leles (7 in 2006 and 10 in 2007), Cochran (14 in 2008), Mindy Cowles (18 in 2008), B.B. Bates (5 in 2010), Andrea Harrison (17 in 2010), Katelyn Boyd (18 in 2011), Kaila Hunt (21 in 2012), Amanda Locke (18 in 2012), Pendley (22 in 2013), Keilani Ricketts (15 in 2013), Jessica Shults (7 in 2013), Lauren Haeger (20 in 2014 and 19 in 2015), Sydney Romero (10 in 2016 and 12 in 2017), Jessica Warren (21 in 2018) and Alo (34 in 2021) all won national championships those years; Stacie Chambers and Harrison share the Women's College World Series record for home runs with four each in 2009 and 2010 respectively. For their careers, Alo (Big 12), Jessie Harper and Katiyana Mauga (Pac-12), Gomez (Sun Belt), Warren (ACC), Sierra Romero (Big Ten), Kate Gordon (CAA), Karli Spaid (MAC), Morgan Noad (Big South), Jenna Cone (A-10), Erika Piancastelli (Southland), Kelsey Horton (WAC), Best (A-Sun), Mia Davidson (SEC), Angeline Quiocho (MWC), Samantha Fischer (WCC), Vicky Galasso (Big Sky), Carrera (USA), Dara Toman (Horizon), Laura Taylor (Big East), Amy Baker (MVC), Lauren May (Ivy), Deanna Dovak (MAAC), Hayley Norton (NEC), Lindsay Thomas (Southern), Addison Barnard (American), Ashley Ellis and Daniela Pappano (OVC), Darian Tautalafua (Big West) and Torrian Wright (MEAC) all own those conference crowns for home runs.
