= American Conference Softball Pitcher of the Year =

College softball award

American Conference Pitcher of the Year
- Awarded for: the most outstanding softball pitcher in the American Conference
- Country: United States

History
- First award: 2014
- Most recent: Anne Long, South Florida

The American Conference Pitcher of the Year is a college softball award given to the American Conference's most outstanding pitcher. The award has been given annually since 2014. Georgina Corrick won the award a record four times.

== Key ==
*	Awarded one of the following College National Player of the Year awards: USA Softball Collegiate Player of the Year; NFCA National Pitcher of the Year

== Winners ==
Season	Player	School	Reference
2014	Sara Nevins	South Florida	
2015	Shelby Turnier	South Florida	
2016	Erica Nunn	South Florida	
2017	Emily Watson	Tulsa	
2018	Georgina Corrick; Savannah Heebner	South Florida; Houston	
2019	Georgina Corrick (2)	South Florida	
2021	Georgina Corrick (3)	South Florida	
2022	Georgina Corrick (4)	South Florida	
2023	Sarah Willis	UCF	
2024	Georgeanna Barefoot	Charlotte	
2025	Autumn Courtney	Florida Atlantic	
2026	Anne Long	South Florida	

== Winners by school ==
School	Winners	Years
South Florida	8	2014, 2015, 2016, 2018, 2019, 2021, 2022, 2026
Florida Atlantic	1	2025
Charlotte	1	2024
UCF	1	2023
Houston	1	2018
Tulsa	1	2017
East Carolina	0	—
Memphis	0	—
Wichita State	0	—
