= Montana Fouts =

American softball player (born 2000)

Utah Talons – No. 14
- Pitcher
- Born: June 4, 2000 (age 26); Charleston, West Virginia, U.S.
- Bats: Right Throws: Right

Teams
- Alabama (2019–2023); Utah Talons (2025–present)

Career highlights and awards
- 2× AUSL champion (2025, 2026); NFCA National Pitcher of the Year (2021); Softball America Pitcher of the Year (2023); Honda Sports Award (softball 2023); WCWS All-Tournament Team (2021); SEC Tournament MVP (2021); SEC Co-Pitcher of the Year (2021); 2× First Team All-American (2021, 2023); 2× Second Team All-American (2019, 2022); SEC Freshman of the Year (2019); 3× Kentucky Gatorade Player of the Year (2016–18); USA Today All-USA High School Player of the Year (2018); MaxPreps National Softball Player of the Year (2018)
Medals
Women's softball
Representing United States
World Games
Gold medal – first place	2022 Birmingham	Team
Pan American Games
Gold medal – first place	2023 Santiago	Team

Montana Fay Fouts (born June 4, 2000) is an American professional softball pitcher for the Utah Talons of the Athletes Unlimited Softball League (AUSL) and is a member of the United States women's national softball team. A four-time All-American pitcher at the University of Alabama, she is best known for pitching a perfect game against UCLA in the 2021 Women's College World Series.

== Early life ==
Montana Fay Fouts was born on June 4, 2000, in Charleston, West Virginia. After her parents separated, she moved with her mother to Grayson, Kentucky, at age 10; her father regularly drove around 80 miles from Charleston to Grayson to watch her high school games. She attended East Carter High School where she was named Kentucky's Miss Softball and Kentucky's state Gatorade Player of the Year in softball in 2016, 2017, and 2018. Fouts holds the Kentucky high school softball ERA record for a pitcher of 0.16 earned runs allowed per game, and set a single-season high school record in the state for the most perfect games (9) and no-hitters (14). Fouts had 111 career high school wins with 1,483 strikeouts, 77 shutouts, 25 no-hitters and 15 perfect games.

== College career ==
Fouts committed to Alabama in 2014, during her freshman year of high school.

=== Freshman year ===
Fouts made her debut for Alabama on February 8, 2019, against Troy, getting nine strikeouts with one run allowed and four hits. In her freshman year, she went 21–6 in games that she started, had an ERA of 1.39, and threw 193 strikeouts. Fouts led Alabama softball to a berth in the 2019 Women's College World Series where she pitched shutouts against Arizona and Oklahoma. Eventually, Alabama lost to Oklahoma 7–3 in the second game of the semifinals. Fouts was named the 2019 SEC Freshman of the Year and was on the 2019 SEC All-Freshman team.

In August 2019, Fouts received an invitation to try out for the United States women's national softball team competing in the 2020 Summer Olympics, but did not make the team.

=== Sophomore year ===
During the 2020 season that was eventually shortened by the COVID-19 pandemic, Fouts went 3–3 with a career-high 2.04 ERA and 41 strikeouts.

=== Junior year ===
During the 2021 season in her junior year, Fouts went 27–4 with a 1.61 ERA and 349 strikeouts. She led Alabama to their first SEC tournament championship since 2012, defeating Florida 4–0 in the final round on May 15, 2021, and being named tournament MVP. Fouts recorded 39 strikeouts in the tournament over the course of three days, setting a new tournament record.

In the 2021 Women's College World Series, Fouts led Alabama to a 5–1 victory against Arizona with a career-high 16 strikeouts. Fouts pitched the sixth perfect game in Women's College World Series history, and the first since Courtney Blades in 2000 in a 6–0 victory over UCLA. During the semifinal round of the tournament against Florida State, Fouts allowed seven runs before being replaced by pitcher Lexi Kilfoyl in the third inning, and Alabama eventually was eliminated after losing the game 8–5. Fouts and teammate Bailey Hemphill were named by NCAA to the 2021 Women's College World Series All-Tournament Team. In addition, she also won the 2021 NFCA National Pitcher of the Year, 2021 D1Softball Pitcher of the Year, and the 2021 SEC Pitcher of the Year awards.

=== Senior year ===
Fouts completed her bachelor's degree in psychology in December 2021 and began graduate studies in hospitality management in the spring 2022 semester.

During the 2022 season in her senior year, Fouts appeared in 39 games, including 36 starts, posting a 24–8 record with a 2.10 ERA and 277 strikeouts. She earned four SEC Pitcher of the Week awards, the most weekly awards of any player in the conference, and led the SEC in strikeouts. Following the season, Fouts was named a top-25 finalist for the USA Softball Collegiate Player of the Year and a second-team All-American.

=== Redshirt senior year ===
During the 2023 season in her redshirt senior year, Fouts posted a 25–11 record with a 1.49 ERA and 323 strikeouts. Following the season she was named Softball America Pitcher of the Year. She finished her college softball career with the Crimson Tide ranked second in program history in strikeouts (1,181), third in shutouts (35), fourth in wins (100) and complete games (89) and fifth in ERA (1.66).

In 2023, Fouts was chosen as the Honda Sports Award winner for softball, the first Alabama player to win this award.

== Professional career ==
On April 17, 2023, Fouts was drafted, in the sixth round, 23rd overall, by the Smash It Sports Vipers in the 2023 WPF draft.

On January 29, 2025, Fouts was drafted in the ninth round, 35th overall, by the Talons in the inaugural Athletes Unlimited Softball League draft. On June 7, 2025, during the first game of the season against the Bandits, Fouts recorded the first strikeout in AUSL history, striking out Bubba Nickles-Camarena. During the 2025 AUSL season, she started six games and posted a 4–2 record, with a 2.21 ERA and 33 strikeouts in 38 innings. On July 27, 2025, during game two of the championship series against the Bandits, she pitched a complete game shutout with seven strikeouts to help the Talons win the inaugural AUSL championship. On July 26, 2026, she once again defeated the Bandits in the championship clinching game. This time, she pitched a complete game shutout while surrendering only four hits and one walk and chalked up four strikeouts in the win.

== International career ==
In July 2022, Fouts played for the United States women's national softball team in the 2022 World Games in Birmingham, Alabama. She notched a save in the semi-final against Australia, as the USA went on to defeat Japan, 3–2, in the gold medal game.

On August 31, 2023, Fouts was again named to the United States national team for the 2023 Pan American Games. At the 2026 USA Softball International Cup, Fouts was named Most Valuable Pitcher of the tournament as the United States won gold.

== Statistics ==
YEAR	ERA	W–L	IP	SO	BB	H	R
2019	1.39	21–6	181.2	193	57	115	46
2020	2.04	3–3	37.2	41	22	38	16
2021	1.61	27–4	213.1	349	49	143	59
TOTALS	1.68	51–13	431.5	583	128	280	121
