= Sandra Day O'Connor High School (Arizona) =

Location
- 25250 N. 35th Ave; Phoenix, Arizona 85083; 33°43′03″N 112°08′18″W

Information
- Type: Public
- Motto: Expect the best. Get the best. Be the best.
- Established: 2002; 24 years ago
- Principal: Lynn Miller
- Teaching staff: 108.70 (FTE)
- Enrollment: 2,658 (2024–2025)
- Student to teacher ratio: 24.45
- Colors: Royal Blue and Metallic Gold
- Mascot: Eagle
- Rival: Mountain Ridge High School
- Newspaper: The Talon
- Website: sdohs.dvusd.org

Sandra Day O'Connor High School (SDOHS), part of the Deer Valley Unified School District, is a public high school located just west of I-17 and north of Happy Valley Road in Phoenix, Arizona. The school had a 97.1% graduation rate in 2018. SDOHS was first awarded the A+ School of Excellence distinction in 2018 and it was renewed in 2023.

The campus, which first opened in fall 2002, is named after former Supreme Court Justice Sandra Day O'Connor, who grew up in Arizona, served as an assistant attorney general, was member of the state senate, and eventually became the first woman appointed as a Supreme Court Justice.

== Athletics ==
- Badminton
- Beach Volleyball
- Baseball
- Basketball
- Cross Country Running
- Football
- Flag Football
- Golf
- Hockey
- Marching Band
- Soccer
- Softball
- Swimming
- Tennis
- Track and Field
- Volleyball
- Wrestling

== Special Programs ==
=== The Academy of Advanced Studies and Civic Engagement ===
Formerly known as the Academy of American Studies, students can apply to be a part of this 4-year program that both focuses on civic engagement and college preparation. Academy students are grouped together into a cohort of students in their grade. Academy Students take AP Human Geography, AP World History: Modern, AP United States History, and AP United States Government and Politics. In addition to Advanced Placement courses, academy students take an online/hybrid U.S. history course as well as participate in an internship in their senior year.

The program is tied together by several trips throughout a student's 4 years in the academy. Underclassmen have previously had the opportunity to go to the Renaissance festival, the Titan Missile Museum, and the Phoenix Crime Lab & Phoenix Police Museum. Summer Institute trips are offered to all Academy students and have previously included destinations such as Philadelphia, New York, Boston, Washington D.C., and Crow Canyon.

=== Gifted Academy ===
SDOHS's Gifted Academy offers motivated students an academically rigorous educational program. Using a gifted cluster model, the academy groups gifted students together and assigns them to teachers with advanced gifted endorsements and qualifications. Gifted courses are supplemented with problem-based, project-based, and cross-curricular learning opportunities that focus on the needs of gifted learners and provide an enhanced educational experience.

SDOHS's long list of Advanced Placement and Dual Enrollment courses gives Gifted Academy students the opportunity to explore different fields and disciplines of study while also gaining college credit. Additionally, AP Seminar and AP Research are two courses students can take to earn a Capstone Diploma.

Although open to all students, most Gifted Academy students graduate with SDOHS's Certificate of Advanced Academics, which supplements their diploma and serves as an indication of their rigorous course work above and beyond the requirements.

=== Air Force Junior ROTC ===
Starting in 2006, SDOHS began offering an Air Force Junior Reserve Officer Training Corps (AFJROTC) program. This program has won back-to-back unit awards from 2009 up to the 2014 school year. The program allows students to learn about the military while also developing life skills and enhancing their leadership abilities.

== Statistics ==
As of the 2023–2024 school year, 2,604 students attend SDOHS. Caucasian students make up the majority at 72.0% of the student body. Students identified as of Hispanic or Latino origins make up 13.4% of students and Asians are at 7.5%. According to the Arizona Department of Education, in 2023, 52% of juniors at SDOHS passed the ELA section of the ACT, and 46% passed the mathematics section. Additionally, 47% of juniors passed the state science assessment. SDOHS was rated an "A" school in 2023 by the Arizona Department of Education.

Demographics
Race/Ethnicity	White	Hispanic or Latino	Asian	Two or More Races	African-American	Other
Number of Students	1874	350	194	101	64	21
Percentage of Students	72.0%	13.4%	7.5%	3.9%	2.5%	0.8%

=== Feeder Schools ===
- Stetson Hills School (K-8)
- Inspiration Mountain School (K-8)
- Desert Sage Elementary School (K-6)
- Las Brisas Elementary School (K-6)
- Hillcrest Middle School (7–8)

Student Outcomes
Class of	2018	2019	2020	2021	2022	2023
4-year College or University	51%	52%	51%	56%	60%	57%
2-year	35%	33%	36%	25%	21%	24%
Tech/Trade School	4%	4%	6%	6%	7%	7%
Armed Forces	3%	4%	4%	4%	2%	2%
Work	7%	7%	4%	9%	7%	6%

== Notable alumni ==
- Amy Bockerstette, golfer and disabilities advocate
- Jocelyn Erickson, college softball player for Florida
- Nolan Gorman, third baseman drafted by the St. Louis Cardinals
- Matthew Knies, professional hockey player for the Toronto Maple Leafs
- Jordin Sparks, winner of American Idol season 6
- Bralen Trice, American football Defensive end for the Washington Huskies
- Grace Turk, former professional softball player

== See also ==
- List of school districts in Arizona
- List of high schools in Arizona
