= Southeastern Conference Softball Pitcher of the Year =

Southeastern Conference Pitcher of the Year
- Awarded for: the most outstanding college softball pitcher in the Southeastern Conference
- Country: United States

History
- First award: 2002-present
- Most recent: Jocelyn Briski, Alabama

The Southeastern Conference Pitcher of the Year is a college softball award given to the Southeastern Conference's most outstanding pitcher. The award has been given annually since 2002.

Monica Abbott of Tennessee has won the award a record three times. The award was shared twice: in 2005 between Monica Abbott and Michelle Green and in 2021 between Montana Fouts and Mary Haff.

== Winners ==
| Season | Player | School | Reference |
|---|---|---|---|
| 2002 | Britini Sneed | LSU | |
| 2003 | Michelle Green | Georgia | |
| 2004 | Monica Abbott | Tennessee | |
| 2005 | Monica Abbott (2); Michelle Green (2) | Tennessee; Georgia | |
| 2006 | Stephanie VanBrakle | Alabama | |
| 2007 | Monica Abbott (3) | Tennessee | |
| 2008 | Stacey Nelson | Florida | |
| 2009 | Stacey Nelson (2) | Florida | |
| 2010 | Kelsi Dunne | Alabama | |
| 2011 | Kelsie Dunne (2) | Alabama | |
| 2012 | Jackie Traina | Alabama | |
| 2013 | Chelsea Thomas | Missouri | |
| 2014 | Jackie Traina (2) | Alabama | |
| 2015 | Lauren Haeger | Florida | |
| 2016 | Kelsey Nunley | Kentucky | |
| 2017 | Kelly Barnhill | Florida | |
| 2018 | Kelly Barnhill (2) | Florida | |
| 2019 | Sarah Cornell | Alabama | |
| 2021 | Montana Fouts; Mary Haff | Alabama; Arkansas | |
| 2022 | Chenise Delce | Arkansas | |
| 2023 | Maddie Penta | Auburn | |
| 2024 | Karlyn Pickens | Tennessee | |
| 2025 | Karlyn Pickens (2) | Tennessee | |
| 2026 | Jocelyn Briski | Alabama | |

== Winners by School ==
| School | Winners | Seasons |
|---|---|---|
| Alabama | 8 | 2006, 2010, 2011, 2012, 2014, 2019, 2021, 2026 |
| Florida | 5 | 2008, 2009, 2015, 2017, 2018 |
| Tennessee | 5 | 2004, 2005, 2007, 2024, 2025 |
| Arkansas | 2 | 2021, 2022 |
| Georgia | 2 | 2003, 2005 |
| LSU | 1 | 2002 |
| Auburn | 1 | 2023 |
| Missouri | 1 | 2013 |
| Kentucky | 1 | 2016 |
| Mississippi State | 0 | — |
| Oklahoma | 0 | — |
| Ole Miss | 0 | — |
| South Carolina | 0 | — |
| Texas | 0 | — |
| Texas A&M | 0 | — |
