= Georgina Corrick =

British professional softball player

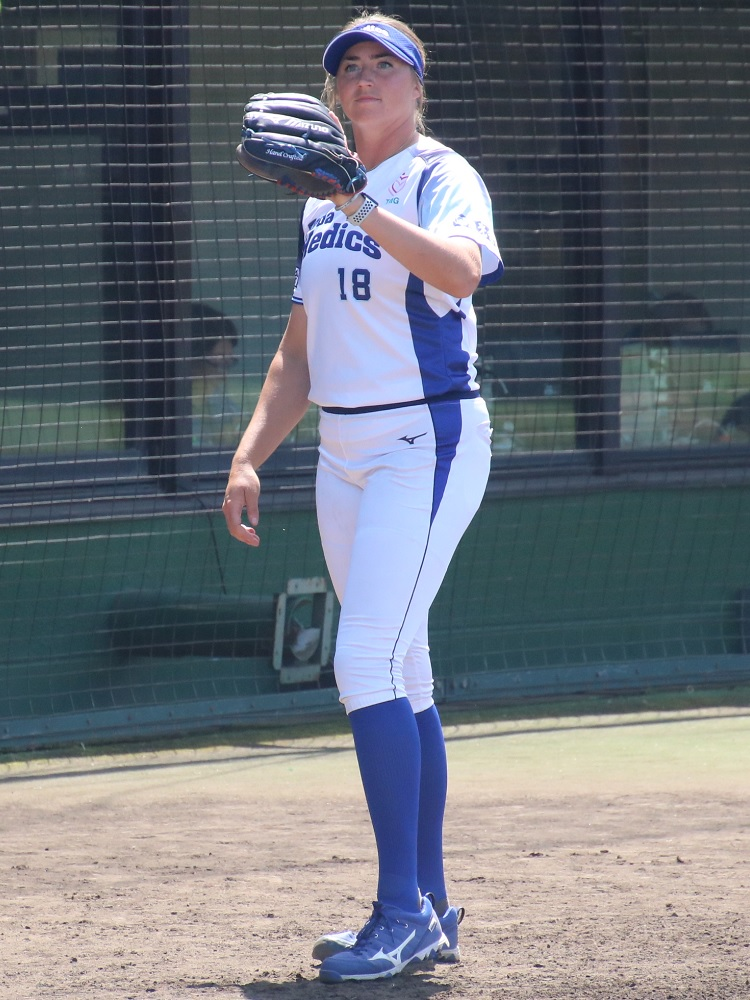

Utah Talons
- Pitcher
- Born: September 29, 1998 (age 27); Basingstoke, England
- Bats: Right Throws: Right

Teams
- As player: South Florida (2018–2022); Athletes Unlimited Softball (2022–present); Toda Medics (2024); Utah Talons (2025–present); As coach: South Florida (2023) (graduate assistant)

Career highlights and awards
- 2× AUSL champion (2025, 2026); AUSL Pitcher of the Year (2025); British Softball Hall of Fame (2024); NFCA National Pitcher of the Year (2022); Softball America Pitcher of the Year (2022); NCAA Pitching Triple Crown (2022); Pitched three perfect games (two in college, one with Great Britain); Pitched eight no-hitters (seven in college, one with Great Britain); First Team All-American (2022); Second Team All-American (2019); Third Team All-American (2021); 4× AAC Pitcher of the Year (2018, 2019, 2021, 2022); AAC Rookie of the Year (2018)
Medals
Women's softball
Representing Great Britain
European Championship
Silver medal – second place	2022 Spain	Team
Bronze medal – third place	2017 Italy	Team
Bronze medal – third place	2019 Czech Republic	Team
Bronze medal – third place	2025 Prague	Team

Georgina Louise Corrick (born September 29, 1998) is a British born, American raised professional softball player for the Utah Talons of the Athletes Unlimited Softball League (AUSL). She previously played softball for the Toda Medics of the Japan Diamond Softball League and college softball for the South Florida Bulls. She is also a member of the Great Britain women's national softball team. In 2022, she was the first pitching Triple Crown winner in NCAA Division I history. In 2024, she was inducted into the British Softball Hall of Fame.

== Early life ==
Corrick was born to John and Sally Corrick in Basingstoke, England. Her family moved to the United States when she was three months old. She attended Seminole High School in Sanford, Florida.

== College career ==
On November 9, 2016, Corrick signed a national letter of intent to attend South Florida for the 2017–18 academic year.

During her freshman year in 2018, Corrick appeared in 32 games for the Bulls, including 27 starts, and posted a 15–9 record with a 1.68 ERA, and 164 strikeouts in 171 1/3 innings. On March 18, 2018, she pitched her first career no-hitter. She became the first USF player to pitch a no-hitter since 2015, and the first freshman to do so since 1996. During conference play, she posted a 1.53 ERA and a 9–3 record, while holding opposing batters to a .204 batting average to help lead South Florida to the AAC regular season championship. Following an outstanding season she was named first-team All-AAC, All-AAC Freshman team, AAC Co-Pitcher of the Year and AAC Rookie of the Year. She was also named a finalist for NFCA National Freshman of the Year.

During her sophomore year in 2019, she appeared in 38 games, including 29 starts, and posted a 25–6 record with a 1.14 ERA, 21 complete games, 11 shutouts, and 260 strikeouts in 214 1/3 innings. Her 260 strikeouts were the sixth most in a single season in USF history, while her 25 wins tied for seventh. She led the conference in ERA, victories, shutouts and hits allowed per seven innings. Following the season, she was named AAC Pitcher of the Year, and NFCA second-team All-American. She was also named a finalist for the USA Softball Collegiate Player of the Year.

During her junior year in 2020, she appeared in 18 games, including 13 starts, and posted a 12–3 record with a 1.29 ERA, 10 complete games, five shutouts, and 127 strikeouts in 97 1/3 innings in a season that was cancelled due to the COVID-19 pandemic. Her 12 wins were the most in the AAC and ranked fourth nationally, while her five shutouts were the most in the AAC and ranked sixth nationally. On March 7, 2020, she recorded a career-high 18 strikeouts in a game against Wisconsin. She tied the program's single-game strikeout record set by Erica Nunn in 2014. She was subsequently awarded the AAC Pitcher of the Week and Wilson/NFCA National Pitcher of the Week for the week ending March 10, 2020.

During her senior year in 2021, she appeared in 39 games, including 33 starts, and posted a 24–9 record with a 0.98 ERA, 28 complete games, 15 shutouts, three saves and 333 strikeouts in 228 1/3 innings. Her 15 shutouts led the nation, and set a USF single-season program record. On April 30, and May 1, 2021, she pitched consecutive no-hitters, becoming the first pitcher in AAC history to do so. This marked her fifth career no-hitter, putting her second all-time at USF trailing only Sara Nevins with nine. Overall during the weekend allowed only two hits and zero earned runs in 24 2/3 innings. She also went 22 2/3 innings without allowing a hit. She was subsequently awarded the AAC Pitcher of the Week and Wilson/NFCA National Pitcher of the Week for the week ending May 4, 2021. She became the first USF player to receive the NFCA weekly award multiple times. During conference play, she posted a 12–2 record with a 0.41 ERA in 103 1/3 innings. Her 129 strikeouts and .110 batting average against both established conference single-season records. Following an outstanding season, she was named AAC Pitcher of the Year, and NFCA third-team All-American.

During her red-shirt senior year in 2022, she posted a 37–5 record with 21 shutouts, 418 strikeouts and a 0.51 ERA in 274 1/3 innings. Through 118 innings this season, she had a 0.06 ERA and recorded a streak of 88 1/3 consecutive scoreless innings, the seventh longest streak in NCAA history. She won the first pitching Triple Crown in NCAA history, after she led the country in ERA, innings pitched, shutouts, strikeout-to-walk ratio, strikeouts and victories. On February 12, 2022, she recorded 11 strikeouts to break the AAC strikeout record, surpassing the previous conference record of 903 set by Emily Watson in 2018. On March 1, 2022, she recorded a career-high 19 strikeouts, setting a new USF single-game record. She also recorded her 38th career shutout, surpassing the previous program record of 37 set by Monica Triner in 1999. On March 6, 2022, she threw her first career perfect game, and the fourth in USF program history. On March 22, 2022, she recorded 14 strikeouts to break the USF career strikeout record, bringing her career total to 1,104. On April 30, 2022, she pitched her second career perfect game, becoming the second player in program history to throw multiple perfect games. She also set the USF single-season strikeouts and AAC single-season strikeouts record with 407.

Corrick led the AAC in wins, innings (94.0), strikeouts and starts (14), while also holding opposing hitters to a .134 average. She led the nation in innings pitched (274.1), shutouts (21), strikeouts (418) strikeout-to-walk ratio (13.13), victories (37), and ERA (0.51) among qualified players, and ranked third in hits allowed per seven innings (2.89). She also pitched two perfect games and a no-hitter this season, bringing her career no-hitter total to nine. Following her outstanding season, she was named American Athletic Conference Pitcher of the Year for the fourth consecutive year, a top-three finalist for the USA Softball Collegiate Player of the Year, NFCA National Pitcher of the Year, Softball America Pitcher of the Year, a first-team All-American, and the USF Female Student Athlete of the Year.

She finished her career with 39 USF and AAC records, including career strikeouts (1,302), innings pitched (977 2/3 innings), complete games (102), shutouts (55), games started (141), and career wins (113).

== Professional career ==
Corrick was selected third overall in the 2022 Athletes Unlimited Softball draft. She competed in the inaugural AUX Softball competition where she finished in fifth place with 1,308 points. She set several records during the AUX competition, including the first pitcher to record double-digit strikeouts, and a record 162 pitches in 9 1/3 innings.

On January 29, 2025, Corrick was drafted sixth overall by the Talons in the inaugural Athletes Unlimited Softball League draft. On June 21, 2025, in a game against the Volts, Corrick pitched the first complete game shutout in AUSL history, allowing three hits and no runs during the game. During the 2025 AUSL season, she was a perfect 6–0, and led the league in wins (six), saves (four), ERA (2.04), opponents' batting average (.202), fewest hits allowed (25) and fewest earned runs allowed (10). Following the season she was named the AUSL Pitcher of the Year. During game one of the AUSL championship series against the Bandits, she earned the win, and helped the Talons win the inaugural AUSL championship.

== International career ==
Corrick represented Great Britain at the 2015 WBSC Junior Women's Softball World Championship, the 2018 Women's Softball World Championship and the 2017 and 2019 European Softball Federation Women's Championship, where she won a bronze medal.

She again represented Great Britain at the 2022 Women's Softball European Championship where she won a silver medal. During the tournament, Corrick threw her first no-hitter for the national team on July 25, 2022, in an opening round-robin game against Germany. On July 27, Corrick helped Great Britain defeat defending champion Italy for the first time in an official European or World tournament game. She allowed four hits, one earned run, one walk and recorded nine strikeouts in the win. She helped Great Britain advance to the European Championship final for the first time since 2009. During the tournament, she ranked first in wins with five and complete games with four, first in earned run average (0.00) and strikeouts (44). She was subsequently named the MVP of team Great Britain.

On July 13, 2023, Corrick pitched a perfect game against Ireland during the 2024 Women's Softball World Cup.

Corrick was inducted into the British Softball Hall of Fame in 2024, while still an active player.

== Coaching career ==
In 2023, Corrick served as a graduate assistant pitching coach with the South Florida Bulls softball team.
