= Jocelyn Erickson =

American softball player

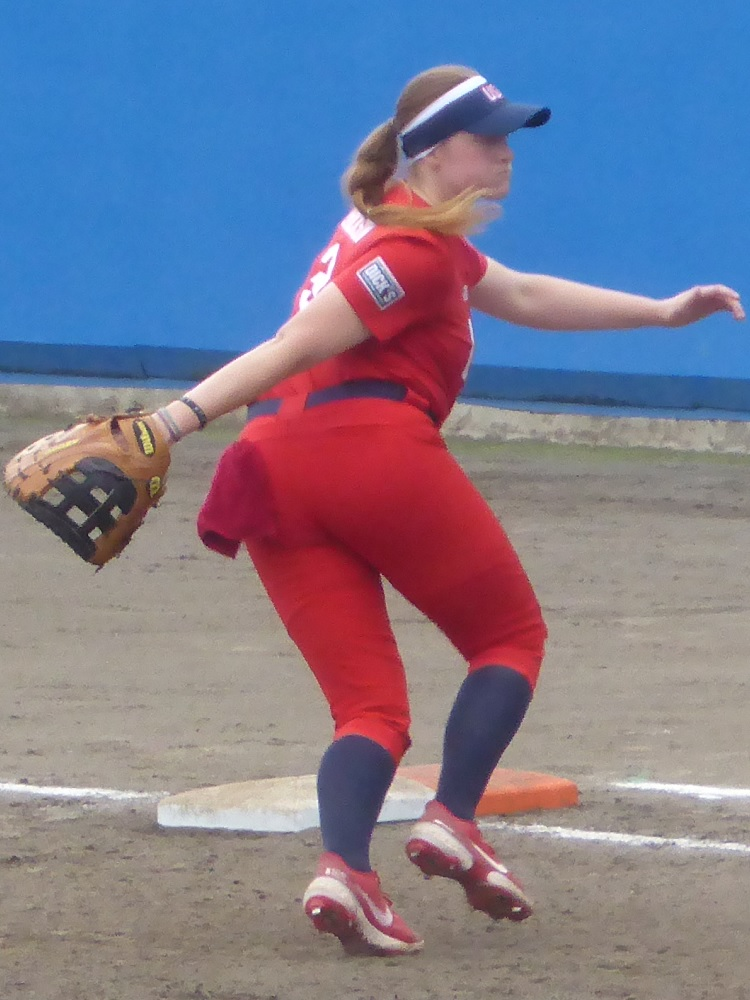
- Erickson in 2024

Chicago Bandits – No. 12
- Catcher
- Born: September 27, 2003 (age 22); Phoenix, Arizona, U.S.

Teams
- Oklahoma (2023); Florida (2024–2026); Chicago Bandits (2026–present)

Career highlights and awards
- Women's College World Series champion (2023); WCWS All-Tournament Team (2024); First Team All-American (2024); NFCA National Player of the Year (2024); NFCA Catcher of the Year (2024); Softball America Defensive Player of the Year (2024); SEC Player of the Year (2024); All-SEC First team (2024); SEC ALL-Defensive team (2024)

Jocelyn Anne Erickson (born September 27, 2003) is an American professional softball player for the Chicago Bandits of the Athletes Unlimited Softball League (AUSL). She played college softball for Oklahoma and Florida. She was named the NFCA National Player of the Year in 2024.

== High school career ==
Erickson attended Sandra Day O'Connor High School in Phoenix, Arizona, where she was a two-sport athlete playing both basketball and softball. During her freshman year in 2019, she led the Eagles with 50 RBIs, while hitting .530 with 16 doubles and eight home runs to help lead her team to the 6A state championship. In January 2021, during the second basketball game of the season, she suffered a torn anterior cruciate ligament and damaged her inside and outside meniscus while playing for the Eagles. As a result of her injury, she was sidelined for the 2021 season.

During the 2022 season, in her senior year, she posted a .624 batting average with 25 home runs, 10 doubles, 58 run batted in (RBI), 50 runs scored and 28 walks, and led the Eagles to the Conference 6A state tournament. Following the season she was named Gatorade Arizona Softball Player of the Year, Arizona Republic All-State Team, 6A Conference Player of the Year and Desert Valley Region Player of the Year.

She was ranked as the nation's No. 10 recruit in the Class of 2022 by Extra Inning Softball. On November 10, 2021, she signed her national letter of intent with Oklahoma.

== College career ==
Erickson began her collegiate career for Oklahoma in 2023. During her freshman year she played in 57 games, with 32 starts at first base or designated player. She hit .337 with seven home runs, 11 doubles, 18 extra-base hits, 32 RBIs and helped Oklahoma win the Women's College World Series in 2023. Defensively she was perfect in the field, making 124 putouts. On February 18, 2023, in a game against Stephen F Austin, she tied a single-game program record with five hits, with two doubles, one home run and eight RBIs. It was the most RBIs by a Sooner since Lynnsie Elam had eight in a game against Iowa on March 20, 2022.

On June 26, 2023, Erickson entered the NCAA transfer portal, less than three weeks after the national championship. On July 13, 2023, it was announced she would transfer to Florida. She wanted to be a full-time catcher and didn't want to wait another year behind fifth-year starter Kinzie Hansen.

During her sophomore year in 2024, she had a .382 average, .494 on-base percentage, 1.189 on-base plus slugging percentage, with 73 hits, 15 doubles, 15 home runs, 50 runs scored and 86 RBIs. Defensively she threw out 13 of the 19 runners trying to steal. Her 80 RBI are tied for the Florida single-season record along with Megan Bush and rank second nationally. Following the season she was named to the All-SEC First team and SEC All-Defensive Team and was named the SEC Player of the Year. She was also named Softball America Defensive Player of the Year, NFCA Catcher of the Year, NFCA National Player of the Year, NFCA First team All-American and a Gold Glove Award recipient.

== Professional career ==
On May 4, 2026, Erickson was drafted fifth overall by the Chicago Bandits in the 2026 AUSL College Draft. On May 29, 2026, she signed a rookie contract with the Bandits.

== International career ==
On August 3, 2026, she won a gold medal representing the United States at the USA Softball International Cup.

== Personal life ==
Erickson was born to David and Jeanine Erickson, and has four siblings, Krislyn, Brendon, Emilee and Kaylee. Brendon played college baseball at BYU, while Emilee and Kaylee played college softball at BYU.
