= Amanda Lorenz =

American softball player

Texas Volts
- Infielder / Outfielder
- Born: April 25, 1997 (age 29); Moorpark, California, U.S.

Teams
- Florida (2016–2019); USSSA Pride (2019); Texas Volts (2025–present)

Career highlights and awards
- NFCA National Freshman of the Year (2016); SEC Freshman of the Year (2016); SEC Player of the Year (2018); 3× First team All-American (2017–2019); Third team All-American (2016); First team All-SEC (2016–2019); Freshman All-SEC (2016)
Medals
Women's softball
Representing United States
World Cup
| Silver medal – second place | 2024 Castions di Strada | Team |
World Games
| Gold medal – first place | 2022 Birmingham | Team |
| Gold medal – first place | 2025 Chengdu | Team |
Pan American Games
| Gold medal – first place | 2023 Santiago | Team |

Amanda Alexis Lorenz (born April 25, 1997) is an American professional softball player for the Texas Volts of the Athletes Unlimited Softball League (AUSL) and member of the United States women's national softball team. She played college softball at Florida, where she was named NFCA National Freshman of the Year in 2016. Following her college career, she played professionally for USSSA Pride. She most recently played in the Athletes Unlimited Pro Softball league where she won the 2024 championship as the top individual points leader.

== High school career ==
Lorenz attended Moorpark High School in Moorpark, California. She was a four-time Cal-Hi Sports First Team All-State, and three-time First Team All-American. During her freshman year, she was named Cal-Hi Sports California Freshman of the Year. During her sophomore year in 2013, she batted .625, with 50 hits, 17 home runs, nine doubles, 45 runs scored, 40 RBIs, and a 1.375 slugging percentage. She helped Moorpark capture its first outright Marmonte League title and was named the league's most valuable player. She was also named Ventura County Player of the Year and a finalist for Cal-Hi Sports Ms. Softball State Player of the Year.

During her junior year in 2014, she batted .642 with 22 doubles, eight home runs, 48 runs, 30 RBIs, and 16 stolen bases. She struck out only three times in 118 plate appearances and had an on-base percentage of .678. Following the season, she was named Ventura County Player of the Year, and Los Angeles Daily News Player of the Year. She finished her high school career with a .592 batting average, .657 on-base percentage, 1.111 slugging percentage, 202 hits, 126 RBI 50 doubles, five triples and 39 home runs. She was ranked the No. 1 recruit in the Class of 2015 by FloSoftball.

== College career ==
Lorenz made her collegiate debut for Florida in 2016. During her freshman year she recorded a team-high .403 batting average, 14 doubles, one triple, eight home runs, 48 RBI, 56 runs scored, and 48 walks. Following an outstanding season, she was named first team ALL-SEC, Freshman All-SEC, SEC Freshman of the Year, and NFCA National Freshman of the Year. During her sophomore year in 2017 she posted a .389 batting average, 12 doubles, three triples, 11 home runs, 46 RBI, 60 runs scored and 58 walks. Following the season she was named All-SEC first team, first-team All-American and 2017 Women's College World Series all-tournament team.

During her junior year in 2018, she started all 67 games for the Gators where she recorded a .416 batting average, 61 RBI, 19 doubles, four triples, 11 home runs and 70 walks and 75 runs. She led the team with 21 multi-hit games, ranked second with 17 multi-RBI games and had a team best eight game hitting streak and reached base safely in all 67 games. She became the only player in program history to reach base safely in all games played during a season, she also broke the Florida single-season record for walks with 70, and set the program single-season record for highest on base percentage (.582). Following an outstanding season, she was named a top-four finalist for USA Softball Collegiate Player of the Year, SEC Player of the Year, All-SEC first team, and first team All-American.

During her senior year in 2019, she had a .422 batting average, with 78 hits, 14 doubles, four triples, 11 home runs, and 41 RBI. Following the season she was named All-SEC first team, SEC all-defensive team, and a top 10 finalist for USA Softball Player of the Year, and Senior CLASS Award. She finished her career at Florida as the program leader in batting average (.407), on-base-percentage (.549), walks (238) and doubles (59), second in hits (301), total bases (507), and sac flies (12), and third in slugging percentage (.685), runs (248) and triples (12). She also reached base safely in 254 out of 265 games played. She was the program's second four-time NFCA All-American, and the first in program history, eighth in SEC history, to be named a four-time All-SEC first team selection. Lorenz helped lead the Gators to three consecutive SEC regular season titles, back-to-back SEC tournament championships in 2018 and 2019, and three consecutive Women's College World Series from 2017 to 2019.

== Professional career ==
Lorenz was drafted second overall by USSSA Pride in the 2019 NPF Draft. On June 7, 2019, she signed a two-year contract with the team. During her first season with the team in 2019, she helped USSSA Pride win the Cowles Cup.

On January 29, 2025, Lorenz was drafted seventh overall by the Volts in the inaugural Athletes Unlimited Softball League draft.

== International career ==
On August 31, 2023, Lorenz was named to the United States women's national softball team for the 2023 Pan American Games.

Lorenz represented the United States at the 2024 Women's Softball World Cup and won a silver medal.

== Coaching career ==
On August 28, 2020, Lorenz was named volunteer assistant coach for the Florida Gators.
