= Southeastern Conference Softball Player of the Year =

Southeastern Conference Player of the Year
- Awarded for: the most outstanding softball player in the Southeastern Conference
- Country: United States

History
- First award: 1997
- Most recent: Katie Stewart, Texas

The Southeastern Conference Player of the Year is a softball award given to the Southeastern Conference's most outstanding player. The award was first given following the 1997 season, with both pitchers and position players eligible. After the 2002 season, the Southeastern Conference Softball Pitcher of the Year award was created to honor the most outstanding pitcher.

Only two players in history have won the award twice: Iyhia McMichael of Mississippi State (2003, 2004), and Charlotte Morgan of Alabama (2009, 2010).

== Winners ==
Season	Player	School	Position	Reference
1997	Trinity Johnson	South Carolina	Pitcher	
1998	Chelsea Sakizzie	Florida	Pitcher	
1999	Kim Pietro	South Carolina	Outfielder	
2000	Ashlee Ducote	LSU	Third baseman	
2001	Britini Sneed	LSU	Pitcher	
2002	Trena Peel	LSU	Outfielder	
2003	Iyhia McMichael	Mississippi State	Outfielder	
2004	Iyhia McMichael (2)	Mississippi State	Outfielder	
2005	Kim Wendland	Georgia	First baseman	
2006	Kristen Butler	Florida	Catcher	
2007	India Chiles	Tennessee	Designated Hitter	
2008	Tonya Callahan	Tennessee	First baseman	
2009	Charlotte Morgan	Alabama	Pitcher/Utility	
2010	Charlotte Morgan (2)	Alabama	Pitcher/Utility	
2011	Kelsey Bruder	Florida	Outfielder	
2012	Michelle Moultrie	Florida	Outfielder	
2013	Lauren Gibson	Tennessee	Second baseman	
2014	Madison Shipman	Tennessee	Shortstop	
2015	Kelsey Stewart	Florida	Third baseman	
2016	Kasey Cooper	Auburn	Third baseman	
2017	Meghan Gregg	Tennessee	Shortstop	
2018	Amanda Lorenz	Florida	Outfielder	
2019	Abbey Cheek	Kentucky	Third baseman	
2021	Bailey Hemphill	Alabama	Catcher	
2022	KB Sides	Arkansas	Outfielder	
2023	Skylar Wallace	Florida	Shortstop	
2024	Jocelyn Erickson	Florida	Catcher	
2025	Bri Ellis	Arkansas	First baseman	
2026	Katie Stewart	Texas	Catcher	

== Winners by School ==
School	Winners	Seasons
Florida	8	1998, 2006, 2011, 2012, 2015, 2018, 2023, 2024
Tennessee	5	2007, 2008, 2013, 2014, 2017
Alabama	3	2009, 2010, 2021
LSU	3	2000, 2001, 2002
Arkansas	2	2022, 2025
Mississippi State	2	2003, 2004
South Carolina	2	1997, 1999
Auburn	1	2016
Georgia	1	2005
Kentucky	1	2019
Texas	1	2026
Missouri	0	—
Oklahoma	0	—
Ole Miss	0	—
Texas A&M	0	—
