= Ken Eriksen =

American softball coach

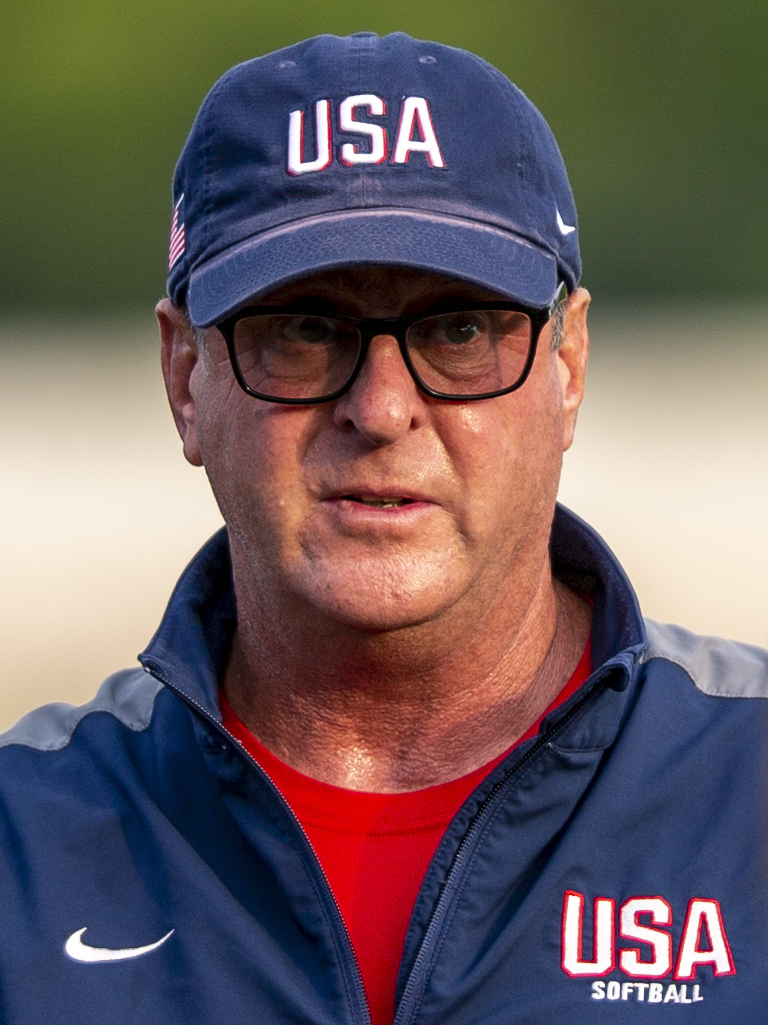
- Eriksen in 2018

Current position
- Title: Head coach
- Team: South Florida
- Conference: AAC
- Record: 1,006–521–1 (.659)

Biographical details
- Born: New York, New York, U.S.
- Education: South Florida

Playing career
- 1981–1984: South Florida
- 1986–1992: Clearwater Bombers
- 1993–1995: Larry Miller-Toyota
- 1996–1997: Tampa Smokers
- Positions: Catcher, Pitcher

Coaching career (HC unless noted)

College Softball
- 1989–1996: South Florida (asst.)
- 1997–present: South Florida

National Softball
- 2002–2011: Team USA Women's Softball (asst.)
- 2011–2021: Team USA Women's Softball

Head coaching record
- Overall: 1,181–543–1 (.685)
- Tournaments: With South Florida: NCAA: 26–27 (.491); Conference: 23–24 (.489); With Team USA: Total record: 175–22 (.888)

Accomplishments and honors

Championships
- As player: 2× Sun Belt Conference (1982 regular season and tournament); 1× ASA Men's Fastpitch (1997); As coach: With South Florida: 2× Conference USA (1997, 1998); 2× Big East (2008, 2013); 3× American Athletic Conference (2016, 2018, 2019); With Team USA: 2× ISF World Championship (2016, 2018); 6× World Cup of Softball (2011, 2012, 2014, 2015, 2018, 2019); 2× Pan American Games (2011, 2019)

Awards
- As player: First-team All-world (1992); As coach: 3× American Athletic Conference coach of the year (2016, 2018, 2019)

Records
- Winningest coach in University of South Florida history (all sports)
Medal record
Player for Men's Softball at the Pan American Games
Silver medal – second place	1991 Santiago
Head coach for Women's Softball
Representing the United States
Olympic Games
Silver medal – second place	2020 Tokyo	Team competition
Head coach for ISF Women's World Championship
Silver medal – second place	2012 Whitehorse
Silver medal – second place	2014 Haarlem
Gold medal – first place	2016 South Surrey
Gold medal – first place	2018 Chiba
Head coach for World Cup of Softball
Gold medal – first place	2011 Oklahoma City
Gold medal – first place	2012 Oklahoma City
Silver medal – second place	2013 Oklahoma City
Gold medal – first place	2014 Irvine, CA
Gold medal – first place	2015 Irvine, CA
Silver medal – second place	2016 Oklahoma City
Silver medal – second place	2017 Oklahoma City
Gold medal – first place	2018 Irvine, CA
Gold medal – first place	2019 Columbus, GA
Head coach for Softball at the Pan American Games
Gold medal – first place	2011 Guadalajara
Silver medal – second place	2015 Toronto
Gold medal – first place	2019 Lima
Assistant Coach for Women's Softball
Representing the United States
Olympic Games
Gold medal – first place	2004 Athens	Team competition
Assistant Coach for ISF Women's World Championship
Gold medal – first place	2002 Saskatoon
Gold medal – first place	2010 Caracas
Assistant Coach for World Cup of Softball
Silver medal – second place	2005 Oklahoma City
Gold medal – first place	2009 Oklahoma City
Gold medal – first place	2010 Oklahoma City
Assistant Coach for Softball at the Pan American Games
Gold medal – first place	2003 Santo Domingo

Kenneth Scott Eriksen (born January 31, 1961) is an American softball coach who is the current head coach of the University of South Florida Bulls and former manager of the United States women's national softball team.

== Early life and education ==
Eriksen graduated high school from Ward Melville High School in East Setauket, New York. Eriksen attended the University of South Florida where he was a member of their baseball team from 1981 to 1984. He graduated from USF in 1984 with a degree in political science. He later returned to South Florida to earn his master's degree in public administration.

== Playing career ==
While at USF, Eriksen played in five different positions, mainly as a pitcher and a catcher. He amassed a career .315 batting average and 2.48 ERA.

After graduating, Eriksen began playing fastpitch softball. In 1986 he was signed by the Clearwater Bombers of the American Softball Association, where he played until 1992. Eriksen also played for the Larry Miller-Toyota team of the ASA from 1993 to 1995 and the Tampa Smokers from 1996 to 1997, after which he retired from playing to become the head coach of USF softball. He also played for the United States men's national softball team where he won silver at the 1991 Pan American Games.

Eriksen was named a First Team All-World catcher in 1992.

== Coaching career ==
=== South Florida ===
While still within a six-year stint with the Clearwater Bombers, Ken Eriksen became the assistant coach of his alma mater's softball team in 1989 under legendary coach Hildred Deese, who led the Bulls to back-to-back national championships in 1983 and 1984. After Deese retired, Eriksen took over as the second softball coach in USF history in 1997. Under his guide, the Bulls have won eight conference titles, made 15 NCAA tournament appearances, and a Women's College World Series appearance in 2012. Also during his time as coach, USF pitchers have thrown three perfect games and 19 no hitters (not including no hitters that were also perfect games). The Bulls have completed 16 seasons with 40 or more wins under Eriksen, including six seasons with 50 or more wins and one of those seasons coming with 60 or more wins. He became the 28th coach in NCAA Division I softball history to win 1,000 games on April 30, 2021, with pitcher Geogina Corrick throwing a no hitter in the win over conference foe ECU.

=== Team USA ===
Eriksen was named as an assistant coach for the United States women's softball team in 2002. With him as an assistant, Team USA won gold medals at the ISF Women's Softball World Championship twice, World Cup of Softball twice, Pan American Games once, and Olympic Games once. In 2011, Eriksen became the head coach of Team USA. Since he took over, the team has won gold medals at the ISF Women's Softball World Championship twice, World Cup of Softball six times, and Pan American Games twice.

== Head coaching record ==
=== College ===
Record table
Season	Team	Overall	Conference	Standing	Postseason
South Florida Bulls (Conference USA) (1997–2005)
1997	South Florida	51–13	12–0	1st	NCAA Regional
1998	South Florida	57–14	11–1	1st	NCAA Regional
1999	South Florida	44–26	6–6	3rd	
2000	South Florida	41–33	11–7	3rd	
2001	South Florida	43–34	12–9	T-3rd	NCAA Regional
2002	South Florida	24–33–1	9–11	5th	
2003	South Florida	54–19	17–6	2nd	NCAA Regional
2004	South Florida	60–14	18–5	3rd	NCAA Regional
2005	South Florida	42–28	15–9	4th	NCAA Gainesville Regional
South Florida Bulls (Big East Conference) (2006–2013)
2006	South Florida	50–25	17–3	2nd	NCAA Los Angeles Super Regional
2007	South Florida	44–22	15–5	2nd	
2008	South Florida	44–20	16–4	1st	NCAA Gainesville Regional
2009	South Florida	34–22	12–10	T-4th	
2010	South Florida	24–29	9–13	9th	
2011	South Florida	33–21	13–5	4th	
2012	South Florida	50–14	17–5	3rd	Women's College World Series
2013	South Florida	45–16	18–3	2nd	NCAA Gainesville Regional
South Florida Bulls (American Athletic Conference) (2014–Present)
2014	South Florida	43–17	13–5	2nd	NCAA Tallahassee Regional
2015	South Florida	36–20	6–10	5th	
2016	South Florida	45–16	15–3	1st	NCAA Tallahassee Regional
2017	South Florida	32–24	9–8	4th	
2018	South Florida	39–23	14–7	1st	NCAA Gainesville Regional
2019	South Florida	41–19	13–2	1st	NCAA Tallahassee Regional
2021	South Florida	31–19	16–7	2nd	NCAA Gainesville Regional
2022	South Florida	45–16	12–5	3rd	NCAA Tallahassee Regional
South Florida:		1,006–521–1 (.659)	301–142 (.679)		
Total:		1,006–521–1 (.659)			
National champion Postseason invitational champion Conference regular season champion Conference regular season and conference tournament champion Division regular season champion Division regular season and conference tournament champion Conference tournament champion
