= Amy Bockerstette =

American golfer and disability advocate

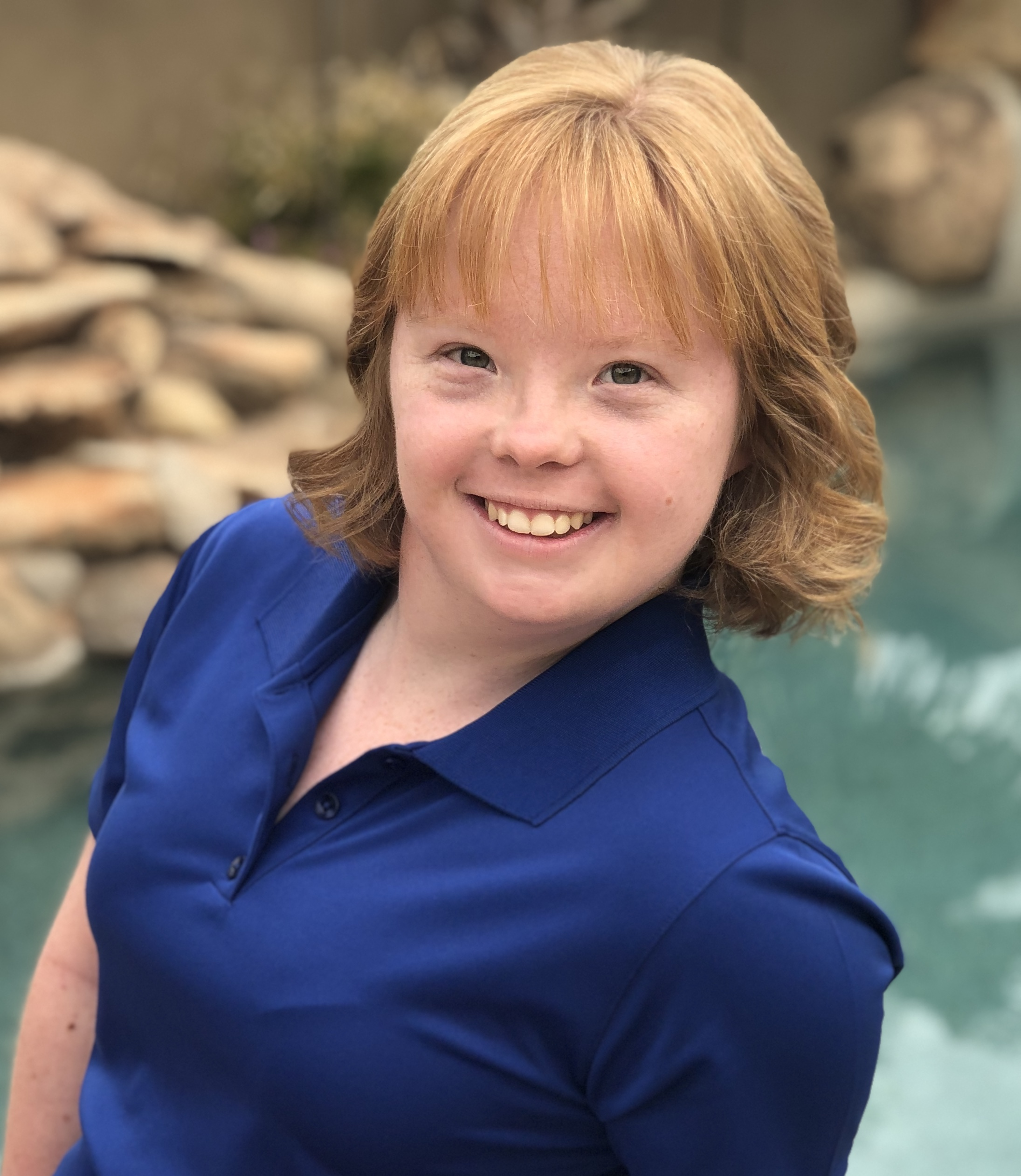

Personal information
- Born: October 15, 1998 (age 27) Fort Wayne, Indiana, US

Career
- College: Paradise Valley Community College

Amy Bockerstette (born October 15, 1998) is an American competitive amateur golfer and disabilities advocate with Down syndrome. She is the first person with Down syndrome to both receive an athletic scholarship to attend college and also to compete in a national collegiate championship.

== Early life ==
Bockerstette (pronounced Bock-er-steady) was born in Fort Wayne, Indiana. From ages 5 to 12 Amy attended Three Rivers Montessori School where her classes were with peers in a general education classroom setting. After moving to Phoenix, Arizona in 2010, she attended Stetson Hills Elementary School. Her parents are Joe Bockerstette, a small business owner and former board chair of the National Down Syndrome Society and Jenny Bockerstette, a former paralegal and college instructor. She has one sister, Lindsey Corbin. In 1999, Amy's parents co-founded the Down Syndrome Association of Northeast Indiana with several other Fort Wayne families.

== High school golf ==
Bockerstette's first experience with organized golf came in the spring of her eighth grade year. She participated on a school club golf team, where she impressed her school's coach such that he recommended to her parents that she join the girls golf team in high school.

Bockerstette attended Sandra Day O'Connor High School in Phoenix, Arizona, where she was primarily included in general education classes, and graduated with a full diploma in May 2018. She played on the high school girls golf team for four years, and earned her varsity letter for golf in her sophomore, junior and senior seasons.

== Career ==
In high school, Bockerstette became the first person with Down syndrome to play in the Arizona High School Girls Golf Division I State Championship, where she competed as both a junior and senior. In 2017, she was honored at the AZCentral.com Sports Awards with the Best Moment of the Year Award for Arizona High School Sports. As a representative of Special Olympics Arizona, Bockerstette played in the LPGA Bank of Hope Founders Cup Pro-Am with professional golfers Sarah Jane Smith and Gerina Piller in March 2017. She was named by AZCentral.com as one of the "Ten Most Intriguing High School Athletes of 2017".

In May 2018, Bockerstette signed a letter of intent to play golf at Paradise Valley Community College in Phoenix, Arizona. For 4 years, she studied dance at PVCC and played on a full golf scholarship, completing her college career in May 2022. She was afforded two one-year golf scholarship extensions due to COVID-19.

Bockerstette is a Special Olympics athlete in golf, swimming and volleyball and plays Challenger baseball. She also plays piano.

== Accomplishments ==
As a representative of Special Olympics Arizona, on January 29, 2019, Bockerstette was invited by the PGA Tour to play the par-3 16th hole at TPC Scottsdale with professional golfer Gary Woodland and playing partner Matt Kuchar during the Tuesday practice round at the Waste Management Phoenix Open. After hitting her tee shot into a greenside bunker, she parred the hole in front of a roaring crowd, confidently stating "I got this!" The video capturing the moment has since gone viral, receiving 55 million views across various social media platforms. Woodland is even quoted saying to Golf.com, "I've been blessed to do lot of cool things on the golf course but that is by far the coolest thing I've ever experienced."

On June 16, 2019, Gary Woodland won the U.S. Open at Pebble Beach and credited Bockerstette and her iconic "I got this!" as inspiration for his victory. At the post-win press conference, Woodland FaceTimed her live, telling her "I used your positive energy." The PGA Tour video of the exchange also went viral. Two days later, Woodland joined Bockerstette with a surprise appearance on The Today Show where, pointing to the U.S. Open trophy in her hands, he told her "We won that together."

In June 2019, Bockerstette was the keynote speaker for the National Down Syndrome Congress Annual Convention, where more than 2000 attendees gave her a standing ovation for her speech, "What's Your Superpower?"

Bockerstette and her family launched a 501(c)(3) nonprofit corporation, the I GOT THIS Foundation, at her 21st birthday party in October 2019. The foundation mission is to promote golf instruction and playing opportunities for people with Down syndrome and other intellectual disabilities.

On December 28, 2019, Bockerstette served as one of five Grand Marshals for the 2019 Desert Financial Fiesta Bowl Parade, alongside USWMT soccer players Julie Ertz and Jessica McDonald, US paratriathlete Allysa Seely and WNBA basketball player Diana Taurasi.

On December 17, 2020, Bockerstette was appointed to a two-year term on the President's Council on Sports, Fitness, and Nutrition.

After completing her sophomore year at Paradise Valley Community College, on May 5, 2021, Bockerstette was awarded the Golden Puma Distinguished Leadership Award, which is the highest award bestowed upon PVCC students annually and recognizes model students who have integrated academic excellence with achievement in areas such as leadership, athletics, community service, fine and performing arts, entrepreneurship and career achievement.

In Spring 2021, the PVCC Women's Golf Team (Coach Matt Keel, Captain Paige Dormal, Sara Kearns, Jinkyung Kim, Amber Daczka, Amy Bockerstette, and Emily Ingles) competed at the 2021 NJCAA Women's Golf Championship held at Plantation Bay Golf and Country Club in Ormond Beach, Florida. On May 20, 2021, Bockerstette made history by becoming the first person with Down syndrome to compete in a national collegiate championship.

On June 24, 2021, Bockerstette was named one of two inaugural recipients of the Champion Award by the NJCAA Foundation. The Champion Award was established to honor a member or former member of the NJCAA community who exemplifies resilience, excellence, and passion.

On April 29, 2022, Bockerstette was named as one of the 48 Most Intriguing Women of Arizona by 48 Arizona Women and the Arizona Historical Society. She is featured in a coffee table book entitled: Arizona's 48 Most Intriguing Women—A New Decade, telling each woman's story in words and photos. Honorees were selected from 15 cities across Arizona and included Dr. Sian Proctor, who on September 15, 2021, became the first African American Woman to pilot a spacecraft.

On June 6–9, 2022, Bockerstette competed at the 2022 Special Olympics USA Games in Orlando Florida in the Level 5 category, 18 holes individual golf competition, at Orange National Golf Center, where she won a silver medal.

On July 18–20, 2022, Bockerstette competed in the Inaugural U.S. Adaptive Open, hosted by the United States Golf Association (USGA) at Pinehurst Resort and Country Club's Course No. 6. Individual handicaps were the primary factor in selecting the field of 78 men and 18 women from 299 applicants. The 96 players representing 14 countries competed across eight different impairment categories: arm impairment, leg impairment, multiple limb amputee, neurological impairment, seated players, short stature, vision impairment and intellectual impairment. Amy finished 10th overall among the 18 women in the competition.

Bockerstette continues to represent the I Got This Foundation, as a speaker and by attending various charity golf tournaments and fundraising events, where she advocates for inclusion and for people with disabilities.
