= Iyhia McMichael =

American softball player

Iyhia McMichael is an American former collegiate All-American, professional 3-time All-Star, right-handed hitting softball player, originally from Nacogdoches, Texas. She was an outfielder for the Mississippi State Bulldogs in the Southeastern Conference from 2001 to 2004, ranking in several school and conference records. She would go on to be named a 4-time all-conference honoree and back-to-back SEC Player of the Year in 2003–04. She also ranks top-15 all time in the NCAA Division I for her career triples. She was later drafted No. 1 overall in the National Pro Fastpitch and played for the defunct Akron Racers from 2004 to 2007, including being named the league's first Player of The Year and winning a title in 2005; McMichael ranks top-10 for career batting average for the league. McMichael has also coached at the college level.

== Statistics ==
Mississippi State Bulldogs
YEAR	G	AB	R	H	BA	RBI	HR	3B	2B	TB	SLG	BB	SO	SB	SBA
2001	62	189	26	61	.322	29	5	3	9	91	.481%	20	38	28	32
2002	67	207	46	69	.333	48	4	8	16	113	.546%	37	26	36	40
2003	64	186	63	75	.403	63	18	5	10	149	.801%	38	20	36	37
2004	65	183	83	87	.475	42	10	10	16	153	.836%	51	18	41	48
TOTALS	258	765	218	292	.381	182	37	26	51	506	.661%	146	102	141	157
