= Skylar Wallace =

American softball player

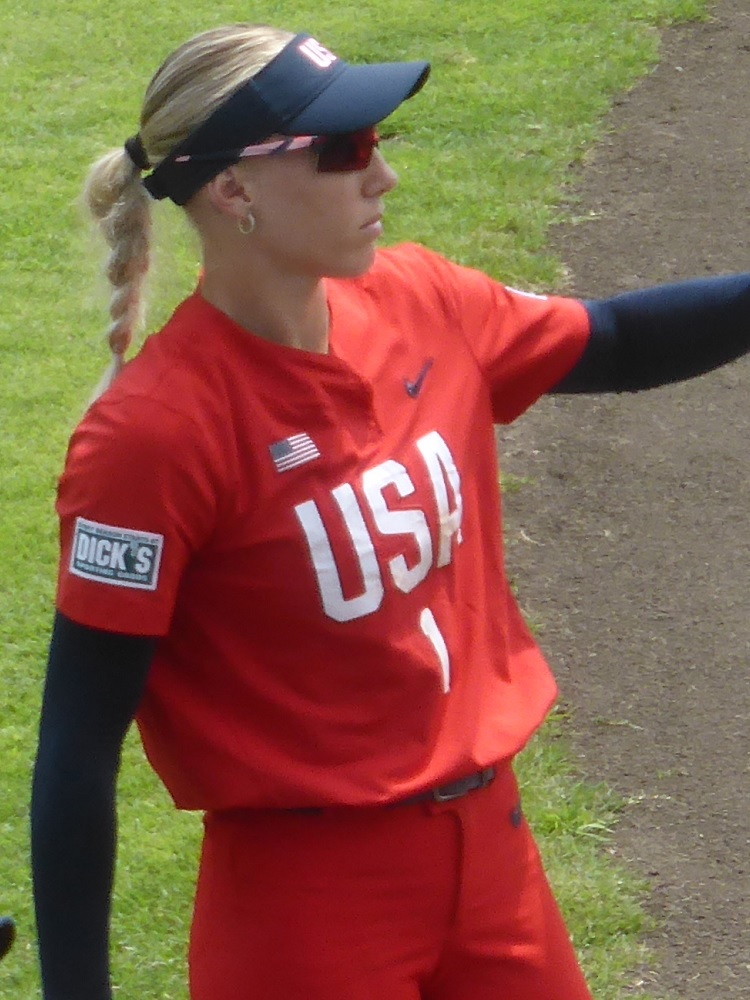
- Wallace in 2024

Chicago Bandits
- Infielder
- Born: January 4, 2000 (age 26); Woodstock, Georgia, U.S.

Teams
- Alabama Crimson Tide (2019–2020); Florida Gators (2022–2024); Chicago Bandits (2025–present)

Career highlights and awards
- First Team All-American (2023); Second Team All-American (2022); NFCA National Player of the Year (2023); SEC Player of the Year (2023); 3× All-SEC First team (2022–2024); SEC All-Freshman team (2019)
Medals
Women's softball
Representing the United States
World Games
Gold medal – first place	2025 Chengdu	Team

Maelynn Skylar Wallace (born January 4, 2000) is an American professional softball player for the Chicago Bandits of the Athletes Unlimited Softball League (AUSL). She played college softball at Alabama and Florida. She was named the NFCA National Player of the Year in 2023.

== High school career ==
Wallace attended Etowah High School in Woodstock, Georgia. During her high school career she was a four-time Etowah High School MVP, three-time all-state honoree, the 2015 5A Region Player of the Year and 2017 7A Region Player of the Year. She led Etowah High School to a second-place finish at the GHSA State Championship as a senior in 2018. She was ranked No. 3 in FloSoftball Hot 100 ranking for the class of 2018. On November 8, 2017, she signed her national letter of intent with Alabama.

== College career ==
Wallace began her collegiate career for Alabama in 2019. During her freshman year she started 68 games at second base, and recorded 49 hits, six doubles, two triples, seven home runs, and 32 run batted in (RBI), with a .295 batting average. Following the season she was named to the SEC All-Freshman Team. During her sophomore year in 2020, she started all 22 games at shortstop, and recorded 24 hits, five doubles, two triples, one home run and 18 RBI, with a .387 batting average, in a season that was shortened due to the COVID-19 pandemic.

On November 18, 2020, it was announced Wallace would transfer to Florida. She had to sit out the 2021 season due to SEC inner-conference transfer rules.

During her junior year in 2023, she led the SEC in batting average (.447), slugging percentage (.980), and triples (8), ranked second in on-base-percentage (.595), runs (72), total bases (147), walks (51) and stolen bases (30), and ranked third in home runs (19). She led NCAA Division I in slugging percentage and ranked second in on-base percentage. She was the only player in the nation with 65 or more hits, 70 or more runs, 55 or more RBI, 50 or more walks and 30 or more stolen bases. She set the Florida single-season record in batting average, slugging percentage and on base percentage. On April 14, 2023, she recorded a career-high four hits, three home runs and seven RBI in a game against Georgia. She set the Florida single-game record with three home runs and 13 total bases, while her seven RBI were tied for third most by a Florida player in a single game. Following the season she was named SEC Player of the Year and NFCA National Player of the Year. She was also named a unanimous first team NFCA all-American selection.

During the 2024 SEC tournament, she hit .778 (7-for-9) with five runs scored, three home runs and nine RBI. She hit in three runs during the championship game and was named tournament MVP. Her nine RBI and three home runs were the most by any player in a single SEC tournament.

== Professional career ==
Wallace was drafted sixth overall in the 2024 AU Pro Softball College Draft. On July 9, 2024, she signed with Athletes Unlimited Pro Softball for the 2024 season.

On January 29, 2025, Wallace was drafted in the third round, 11th overall, by the Bandits in the inaugural Athletes Unlimited Softball League draft. On June 7, 2025, during the first game of the season against the Talons, Wallace recorded the first stolen base in AUSL history.

== Personal life ==
Wallace was born to Lynn and Kim Wallace, and has one sibling, a brother, Cullen.
