= South Florida Bulls softball =

College softball team

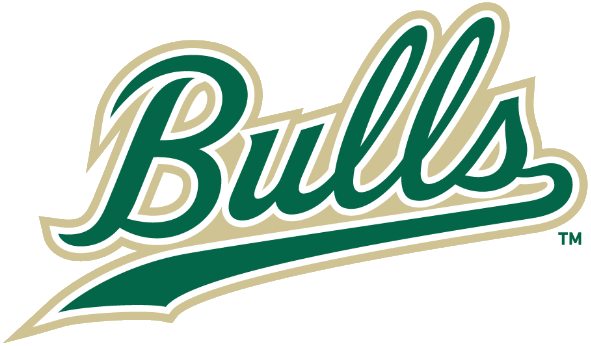
- Founded: 1973; 53 years ago (Note: While the team started play in the AIAW in 1973, the university considers 1985 to be the founding year because it is the year the team joined the NCAA.)
- University: University of South Florida
- Athletic director: Michael Kelly
- All-time Record: 1,785-925-1 (.659)
- Head coach: Ken Eriksen (24th season)
- Conference: The American
- Location: Tampa, Florida, US
- Home stadium: USF Softball Stadium (capacity: 1,600)
- Nickname: Bulls
- Colors: Green and gold

ASA national champions
- 1983, 1984

NCAA WCWS appearances
- 2012

AIAW WCWS appearances
- 1976, 1981

NCAA super regional appearances
- 2006, 2012

NCAA Tournament appearances
- 1996, 1997, 1998, 2001, 2003, 2004, 2005, 2006, 2008, 2012, 2013, 2014, 2016, 2018, 2019, 2021, 2022, 2025, 2026

Conference tournament championships
- 2013, 2025, 2026

Regular-season conference championships
- 1996, 1997, 1998, 2008, 2016, 2018, 2019, 2026

The South Florida Bulls softball team represents University of South Florida in NCAA Division I college softball. The team participates in the American Conference. The Bulls are currently led by head coach Ken Eriksen. The team plays its home games at USF Softball Stadium located on the university's main campus in Tampa, Florida.

USF's softball team has won two national championships, both coming before softball was an NCAA sanctioned sport. They won in the American Softball Association in 1983 and 1984. They have also won 11 conference championships, eight of which were regular season titles and three of which were in the conference tournament. They have reached 19 NCAA tournaments

== History ==
=== Pre-NCAA ===
Before softball officially became an NCAA sport in 1985, the Bulls (known as the Lady Brahmans until 1987) played in the Association for Intercollegiate Athletics for Women and the American Softball Association. Unfortunately, not many records exist from this era of USF softball, and 1985 is recognized by the school as the first official season of the team as that is the year they joined the NCAA. However, it is known that the team's actual first season of play was in 1973 and that the team went to the AIAW Quarterfinals in 1976 and 1981. Hildred Deese was USF's only head coach for this entire era; she also coached the USF volleyball team from 1979–1983. After the AIAW disbanded in 1982, the American Softball Association (now USA Softball) took over as the top collegiate governing body for the sport. The Lady Brahmans won the national championship in both years of the ASA before joining the NCAA in 1985, making them the first team in USF history to win a national championship.

=== Early NCAA years (1985–1996) ===
Hildred Deese continued as head coach for the early years of USF in the NCAA. For most of these years, USF competed without a conference affiliation as their main conferences during this time did not sponsor softball as a sport, but they joined the softball-only Southern Atlantic Softball Alliance in 1995 along with big-name teams like Florida State. Although the Bulls finished with a winning percentage of .500 or better during every year of Deese's tenure, they were not selected for the NCAA tournament until her final year coaching the team in 1996, in which they won their first conference title.

=== Ken Eriksen era (1996–present) ===
Following Deese's retirement, she was replaced by Ken Eriksen, who played on the USF baseball team from 1981–1984. Under the new coach, the Bulls won the SASA title in 1997 and 1998, with the 1998 team finishing with a .803 win percentage, the best record in team history to that point. Conference USA started sponsoring softball in 2000, so the Bulls left SASA after 1999. They had less success in CUSA and never won a title in that league, but started to become mainstays in the NCAA tournament during their time in the conference, reaching the tournament in 2001, 2003, 2004, and 2005. In 2003, Leigh Ann Ellis became the first USF softball pitcher to throw a perfect game.

The Bulls left Conference USA for the Big East starting in 2006, and reached their first NCAA Super Regional that year where they fell to UCLA. The Bulls won their first Big East title in 2008. In 2011, the new USF Softball Stadium opened. USF's 2012 season was their most successful since joining the NCAA. Pitcher Sara Nevins threw a perfect game in March, the Bulls hosted a Super Regional for the first time, and secured their first-ever NCAA Women's College World Series berth. USF won their first conference tournament in 2013 (albeit the SASA did not have a conference tournament while USF was a member) before joining the American Athletic Conference (now known as the American Conference) in 2014.

Sara Nevins threw another perfect game in 2014 en route to another NCAA tournament appearance. USF won its first American Athletic Conference crown in 2016, then won again in 2018 and 2019. In 2020, Ken Eriksen temporarily took a leave of absence from the team to coach the USA national team for the 2020 Summer Olympics and assistant coach Jessica Moore was named the interim coach. The season was shortened due to the COVID-19 pandemic and Eriksen returned the following year.

In 2021, Eriksen became the first USF coach in any sport to lead his team to 1,000 wins, doing so during a no hitter pitched by Georgina Corrick (the first of two no hitters Corrick pitched in back-to-back days). Corrick is not only considered the greatest USF softball player of all time, but also one of the greatest college softball players ever. She holds USF's all time records in many categories including wins, strikeouts, innings pitched, complete games, shutouts, and opponent batting average. Despite an injury that prevented her from playing in the conference or NCAA tournaments, Corrick's 2022 season was one of the most dominant college softball seasons ever, achieving a 37–5 record with 21 shutouts and 34 complete games, 418 strikeouts, an ERA of 0.51, and two perfect games. She was unanimously named the 2022 NCAA Pitcher of the Year and was the first college softball pitcher to win a Triple Crown.

=== Coaching history ===
Years	Name	Record	Win percentage
1973–1996	Hildred Deese	686-355	.659
1997–2019, 2021–present	Ken Eriksen	1,083–561–1	.659
2020	Jessica Moore (interim)	16-9	.640

== Season-by-season results ==
Year	Conference	Games played	Record	Win percentage	Conference record	Head coach	Postseason/Notes
1973	Independent (AIAW)	13	10–3	.769	N/A	Hildred Deese	
1974	Independent (AIAW)	18	13–5	.722	N/A	Hildred Deese	
1975	Independent (AIAW)	11	6–5	.545	N/A	Hildred Deese	
1976	Independent (AIAW)	39	30–9	.769	N/A	Hildred Deese	AIAW Quarterfinal
1977	Independent (AIAW)	21	10–11	.476	N/A	Hildred Deese	
1978	Independent (AIAW)	31	18–13	.581	N/A	Hildred Deese	
1979	Independent (AIAW)	42	32–10	.762	N/A	Hildred Deese	
1980	Independent (AIAW)	37	21–16	.568	N/A	Hildred Deese	
1981	Independent (AIAW)	60	37–23	.617	N/A	Hildred Deese	AIAW Quarterfinal
1982	Independent (AIAW)	56	40–16	.714	N/A	Hildred Deese	
1983	Independent (ASA)	67	52–15	.776	N/A	Hildred Deese	**ASA National Champions**
1984	Independent (ASA)	38	31–7	.816	N/A	Hildred Deese	**ASA National Champions**
1985	Independent (NCAA)	59	43–16	.729	N/A	Hildred Deese	
1986	Independent (NCAA)	50	39–11	.780	N/A	Hildred Deese	
1987	Independent (NCAA)	51	32–19	.627	N/A	Hildred Deese	
1988	Independent (NCAA)	52	26–26	.500	N/A	Hildred Deese	
1989	Independent (NCAA)	48	22–26	.458	N/A	Hildred Deese	
1990	Independent (NCAA)	45	27–18	.600	N/A	Hildred Deese	
1991	Independent (NCAA)	53	35–18	.660	N/A	Hildred Deese	
1992	Independent (NCAA)	51	34–17	.667	N/A	Hildred Deese	
1993	Independent (NCAA)	46	28–18	.609	N/A	Hildred Deese	
1994	Independent (NCAA)	51	30–21	.588	N/A	Hildred Deese	
1995	Southern Atlantic Softball Alliance	49	29–20	.592	9–3	Hildred Deese	
1996	Southern Atlantic Softball Alliance	53	41–12	.774	10–2	Hildred Deese	NCAA Regional
1997	Southern Atlantic Softball Alliance	63	50–13	.794	12–0	Ken Eriksen	NCAA Regional
1998	Southern Atlantic Softball Alliance	71	57–14	.803	11–1	Ken Eriksen	NCAA Regional
1999	Southern Atlantic Softball Alliance	70	44–26	.629	6–6	Ken Eriksen	
2000	Conference USA	73	41–33	.562	13–9	Ken Eriksen	
2001	Conference USA	77	43–34	.558	14–11	Ken Eriksen	NCAA Regional
2002	Conference USA	58	24–33–1	.414	9–13	Ken Eriksen	
2003	Conference USA	73	54–19	.740	19–8	Ken Eriksen	NCAA Regional
2004	Conference USA	74	60–14	.811	18–5	Ken Eriksen	NCAA Regional
2005	Conference USA	71	42–29	.592	17–11	Ken Eriksen	NCAA Regional
2006	Big East	75	50–25	.667	17–3	Ken Eriksen	NCAA Super Regional
2007	Big East	66	44–22	.667	15–5	Ken Eriksen	
2008	Big East	64	44–20	.688	16–4	Ken Eriksen	NCAA Regional
2009	Big East	56	34–22	.607	12–10	Ken Eriksen	
2010	Big East	53	24–29	.453	9–13	Ken Eriksen	
2011	Big East	54	33–21	.611	13–5	Ken Eriksen	
2012	Big East	64	50–14	.781	17–5	Ken Eriksen	Women's College World Series
2013	Big East	61	45–16	.738	**18–3**	Ken Eriksen	NCAA Regional
2014	American Conference	60	43–17	.717	13–5	Ken Eriksen	NCAA Regional
2015	American Conference	56	36–20	.643	6–10	Ken Eriksen	
2016	American Conference	61	45–16	.738	15–3	Ken Eriksen	NCAA Regional
2017	American Conference	56	32–24	.571	9–8	Ken Eriksen	
2018	American Conference	62	39–23	.629	14–7	Ken Eriksen	NCAA Regional
2019	American Conference	60	41–19	.683	17–4	Ken Eriksen	NCAA Regional
2020	American Conference	27	16–9	.640	0–0	Jessica Moore (interim) (Note: Ken Eriksen on leave with Team USA)	Season cut short due to COVID-19 pandemic
2021	American Conference	50	31–19	.633	16–7	Ken Eriksen	NCAA Regional
2022	American Conference	61	45–16	.738	12–5	Ken Eriksen	NCAA Regional
2023	American Conference	56	32–24	.571	10–7	Ken Eriksen	
Total		2,711	1,785–925–1	.659	367–173		21 Appearances
Bold indicates tournament won Italics indicate Conference Championship

== Championships ==
=== National Championships ===
Season	League	Record	Head coach
1983	American Softball Association	52-15	Hildred Deese
1984	American Softball Association	31-7	Hildred Deese

=== Conference Championships ===
Season	Conference	Conference record	Head coach
1997	Conference USA	12–0	Ken Eriksen
1998	Conference USA	11–1	Ken Eriksen
2008	Big East Conference	16–4	Ken Eriksen
2016	American Athletic Conference	15–3	Ken Eriksen
2018	American Athletic Conference	14–7	Ken Eriksen
2019	American Athletic Conference	17–4	Ken Eriksen

=== Conference Tournament Championships ===
Season	Conference	Location	Head coach
2013	Big East Conference	Tampa, FL	Ken Eriksen

== Coaching staff ==
Name	Position	Years with team
Ken Eriksen	Head coach	23
Jessica Moore	Associate Head Coach	6
Tommy Santiago	Assistant coach	2
Morgan Gross	Assistant coach	2
Kristen Wyckoff	Volunteer assistant coach	2
Michele Latimer	Senior athletic trainer	15

== Perfect Games and No Hitters ==
=== Perfect Games ===
USF pitchers have thrown five perfect games in school history:

- Leigh Ann Ellis, March 11, 2003, vs. Canisus
- Sara Nevins, March 11, 2012, vs. Toledo
- Sara Nevins, May 4, 2014, vs. Temple
- Georgina Corrick, March 6, 2022, vs. Florida A&M
- Georgina Corrick, April 30, 2022 (Note: This game was suspended due to rain and finished the following day.) vs. Houston

=== No Hitters ===
Bulls pitchers have also thrown 29 no hitters (not including no hitters that were also perfect games):

- Lori Romero, 1985
- Lori Romero, 1986
- Monica Triner, 1996 vs. Bradley
- Monica Triner, 1996 vs. Penn State
- Jessi Kowal, 2000 vs. St. Louis
- Leigh Ann Ellis, 2003 vs. Ball State
- Danielle Urbanik, 2004 vs. UAB
- Kristen Gordon/Bree Spence, 2007 vs. ETSU
- Cristi Ecks, Capri Catalano & Courtney Mosch, 2009 vs. Hofstra
- Sara Nevins, 2012 vs. Central Connecticut
- Sara Nevins, 2012 vs. Pittsburgh
- Lindsey Richardson, 2013 vs. Maine
- Sara Nevins, 2013 vs. Pittsburgh
- Lindsey Richardson, 2013 vs. Providence
- Lindsey Richardson, 2013 vs. Marshall
- Sara Nevins/Erica Nuun, 2014 vs Illinois State
- Sara Nevins, 2014 vs. UMass
- Sara Nevins, 2014 vs. UConn
- Sara Nevins, 2014 vs. UCF
- Erica Nuun, 2015 vs. Illinois State
- Georgina Corrick, 2018 vs. UNF
- Georgina Corrick/Vivian Ponn, 2020 vs. FIU
- Georgina Corrick, 2021 vs. North Dakota
- Georgina Corrick, April 30, 2021 vs. ECU
- Georgina Corrick, May 1, 2021 vs. ECU
- Georgina Corrick, 2021 vs. Baylor
- Georgina Corrick, 2022 vs. ECU
- Payton Dixon, 2023 vs. Houston
- Julia Apostolakos/Alex Wright, 2024 vs. Bethune-Cookman

== Awards and honors ==
=== All-Americans ===
First team

- Leslie Kanter, 1986
- Dawn Melfi, 1992
- Georgina Corrick, 2022

Second team

- Lisa Wunar, 1987
- Monica Triner, 1998
- Monica Triner, 1999
- Holly Groves, 2004
- Sara Nevins, 2012
- Erica Nuun, 2016
- Georgina Corrick, 2019

Third team

- Leigh Ann Ellis, 2004
- Tiffany Stewart, 2005
- Sara Nevins, 2013
- Sara Nevins, 2014
- Georgina Corrick, 2021

=== National awards ===
NFCA National Pitcher of the Year

- Georgina Corrick, 2022

Softball America Pitcher of the Year

- Georgina Corrick, 2022

NFCA Golden Shoe Award

- Alexis Johns, 2022

NCAA Pitching Triple Crown

- Georgina Corrick, 2022 (first pitching triple crown in NCAA history)

=== Conference awards ===
Conference USA Pitcher of the Year

- Leigh Ann Ellis, 2004

Conference USA Freshman of the Year

- Bree Spence, 2005

Big East Pitcher of the Year

- Sara Nevins, 2013

Big East Freshman of the Year

- Cristi Ecks, 2006
- Capri Catalano, 2008

American Conference Player of the Year

- Juli Weber, 2016

American Conference Pitcher of the Year

- Sara Nevins, 2014
- Erica Nunn, 2016
- Georgina Corrick, 2018, 2019, 2021, 2022

American Conference Freshman of the Year

- Juli Weber, 2014
- Georgina Corrick, 2018

American Conference Defensive Player of the Year

- Macy Cook, 2019

=== National Team members ===
- (United States) Monica Triner, 2000
- (United States) Leigh Ann Ellis, 2005–06
- (United States) Kourtney Salvarola, 2011–13
- (United States) Lee Ann Spivey, 2013
- (United States) Erica Nuun, 2013
- (United States) Sara Nevins, 2013–15
- (United States) Astin Donovan, 2015–16
- (United Kingdom) Lauren Evans, 2017–present
- (United Kingdom) Georgina Corrick, 2017–present
- (Puerto Rico) Karla Claudio-Rivera, 2017–present
- (Puerto Rico) Monica Santos, 2017–present
- (Puerto Rico) Kathy Garcia, 2022–present
- (Puerto Rico) Camille Ortiz, 2022–present

=== USF Athletic Hall of Fame ===
- Monica Triner, 1996-99 (inducted 2011)
- Sara Nevins, 2011-14 (inducted 2019)

==== USF Softball Hall of Fame ====
Softball is one of USF's only sports to have its own Hall of Fame outside of the USF Athletic Hall of Fame. The inductees as of 2022 are:

Name	Position	Years with USF
Leslie Kanter	Shortstop	1983–86
Denise Rubio	Second Base	1985–88
Susan Main	Outfield	1986–87
Debbie Morash	Pitcher	1986–87
Lisa Wunar	Third Base	1986–89
Dawn Melfi	Second Base	1991–92
Amy Putnam	Catcher	1993–96
1996 NCAA Tournament Team	–	1996
Jennifer Thompson	Pitcher	1996–99
**Monica Triner**	**Pitcher**	**1996–99**
Lea Mishlan	Shortstop	1997–2000
Ginny Georgantis	Infielder	1998–2001
Courtney Lewellen	Catcher	2000–03
Renee Oursler	Infielder/Outfielder	2000–03
Shelly Riker	Outfielder	2001–04
Holly Groves	Designated Player	2002–04
Carmela Liwag	First Base	2002–05
Leigh Ann Ellis	Pitcher	2003–04
Christie Chapman	Shortstop	2003–06
Krista Holle	Infielder	2003–06
Tiffany Stewart	Outfielder	2004–06
2006 Super Regional Team	–	2006
Britta Giddens	Second Base	2006–09
Kit Dunbar	Outfielder	2007–08
Gina Kafalas	Outfielder	2009–12
Janine Richardson	Shortstop	2009–12
Lindsey Richardson	Pitcher	2010–13
Ashli Goff	Outfielder	2011–14
Stephanie Medina	First Base	2011–14
**Sara Nevins**	**Pitcher**	**2011–14**
Kourtney Salvarola	Shortstop	2011–14
Jessica Mouse	Third Base	2012
2012 WCWS Team	–	2012
Kenshyra Jackson	Third Base	2012–13
Erica Nunn	Pitcher	2013–16
Lee Ann Spivey	Catcher/Outfielder	2013–16

Note: Bold indicates members of the USF Athletic Hall of Fame

== Media ==
Under the current American Conference TV deal, all home and in-conference away softball games are shown on one of the various ESPN networks or streamed live on ESPN+. Live radio broadcasts of games are also available worldwide for free on the Bulls Unlimited digital radio station on TuneIn.

== See also ==
- South Florida Bulls baseball
- University of South Florida
- South Florida Bulls
