= NFCA National Player of the Year =

College softball award

- Awarded for: Best player in college softball
- Country: United States
- Presented by: Schutt Sports

History
- First award: 2016
- Most recent: Jordy Frahm, Nebraska

NFCA National Pitcher of the Year
- Awarded for: Best pitcher in college softball
- Country: United States
- Presented by: Schutt Sports

History
- First award: 2019
- Most recent: Maya Johnson, Belmont

The NFCA National Player of the Year is an award given by Schutt Sports to the best college softball player of the year. The award has been given annually since 2016. In 2019, the award was split into two honors, the player and pitchers of the year. The award is voted on by the members of the NFCA's NCAA Division I All-American Committee.

== Winners ==
=== Player of the Year (2016–present) ===
Year	Player	Position	School	Ref
2016	Sierra Romero	2B	Michigan	
2017	Megan Good	P	James Madison	
2018	Rachel Garcia	P	UCLA	
2019	Abbey Cheek	3B	Kentucky	
2020	Not awarded due to the COVID-19 pandemic			
2021	Rachel Garcia	P	UCLA	
2022	Jocelyn Alo	U	Oklahoma	
2023	Skylar Wallace	U	Florida	
2024	Jocelyn Erickson	C	Florida	
2025	Jordy Bahl	U	Nebraska	
2026	Jordy Frahm	U	Nebraska	

=== Pitcher of the Year (2019–present) ===
Year	Player	School	Ref
2019	Rachel Garcia	UCLA	
2020	Not awarded		
2021	Montana Fouts	Alabama	
2022	Georgina Corrick	South Florida	
2023	Ashley Rogers	Tennessee	
2024	NiJaree Canady	Stanford	
2025	NiJaree Canady	Texas Tech	
2026	Maya Johnson	Belmont	
