= Stephanie VanBrakle Prothro =

American softball coach (born 1983)

Current position
- Title: Assistant coach
- Team: Florida
- Conference: SEC

Biographical details
- Born: May 13, 1983 (age 43)
- Education: Alabama

Playing career
- 2003–2006: Alabama

Coaching career (HC unless noted)
- 2007: Alabama (Grad. asst.)
- 2008: Birmingham–Southern (asst.)
- 2009–2010: Birmingham–Southern
- 2011: Samford
- 2012–2022: Alabama (asst.)
- 2023–2024: Memphis
- 2025–present: Florida (asst.)

Head coaching record
- Overall: 85–141 (.376)

Stephanie VanBrakle Prothro is an American former softball player and current pitching coach at Florida. She previously served as the head coach at Samford, Birmingham–Southern and Memphis.

== Coaching career ==
=== Alabama ===
On July 11, 2011, VanBrakle Prothro was named pitching coach for Alabama.

=== Memphis ===
On August 18, 2022, VanBrakle Prothro was named head coach of the Memphis Tigers softball team. On June 17, 2024, VanBrakle Prothro resigned as head coach of the Tigers after two seasons.

=== Florida ===
On June 17, 2024, VanBrakle Prothro was named pitching coach for Florida.

== Personal life ==
VanBrakle Prothro is married to Quintin Prothro.

== Head coaching record ==
Record table
Season	Team	Overall	Conference	Standing	Postseason
Birmingham–Southern Panthers (Southern Collegiate Athletic Conference) (2009–2010)
2009	Birmingham–Southern	32–5			
2010	Birmingham–Southern	25–9	12–4 (East)	2nd	
Birmingham–Southern:		57–14 (.803)	12–4 (.750)		
Samford Bulldogs (Southern Conference) (2011)
2011	Samford	14–40	9–15	8th	
Samford:		14–40 (.259)	9–15 (.375)		
Memphis Tigers (American Athletic Conference) (2023–2024)
2023	Memphis	8–43	2–16	7th	
2024	Memphis	6–44	1–26	10th	
Memphis:		14–87 (.139)	3–42 (.067)		
Total:		85–141 (.376)			
National champion Postseason invitational champion Conference regular season champion Conference regular season and conference tournament champion Division regular season champion Division regular season and conference tournament champion Conference tournament champion
