= Florida Gators softball =

Team representing the University of Florida in softball

- 2026 Florida Gators softball team
- Founded: 1997 (28 years ago)
- University: University of Florida
- Athletic director: Scott Stricklin
- Head coach: Tim Walton (17th season)
- Conference: SEC
- Location: Gainesville, Florida, US
- Home stadium: Katie Seashole Pressly Softball Stadium (capacity: 2,800)
- Nickname: Gators
- Colors: Orange and blue

NCAA Tournament champions
- 2014, 2015

NCAA WCWS runner-up
- 2009, 2011, 2017

NCAA WCWS appearances
- 2008, 2009, 2010, 2011, 2013, 2014, 2015, 2017, 2018, 2019, 2022, 2024, 2025

NCAA super regional appearances
- 2007, 2008, 2009, 2010, 2011, 2013, 2014, 2015, 2016, 2017, 2018, 2019, 2021, 2022, 2024, 2025, 2026

NCAA Tournament appearances
- 1998, 2000, 2001, 2003, 2004, 2005, 2006, 2007, 2008, 2009, 2010, 2011, 2012, 2013, 2014, 2015, 2016, 2017, 2018, 2019, 2021, 2022, 2023, 2024, 2025, 2026

Conference tournament championships
- 2008, 2009, 2013, 2018, 2019, 2024

Regular-season conference championships
- 1998, 2008, 2009, 2013, 2015, 2016, 2017, 2018, 2021

The Florida Gators softball team represents the University of Florida in the sport of softball. Florida competes in Division I of the National Collegiate Athletic Association (NCAA) and the Southeastern Conference (SEC). The Gators play their home games at Katie Seashole Pressly Softball Stadium on the university's Gainesville, Florida campus, and are currently led by head coach Tim Walton. In the twenty-six year history of the Florida Softball program, the team has won two Women's College World Series (WCWS) national championships, nine SEC regular season championships, five SEC tournament championships, and have made thirteen WCWS appearances.

== History ==
=== Larry Ray era: (1997–2000) ===
On June 13, 1995, the board of directors of the University Athletic Association approved the addition of a women's softball team to the University of Florida's athletic program. Larry Ray, who would coach the new team for their first four seasons, agreed to be the first head coach on September 4, 1995. After the construction of their new stadium facility, the Gators played their first two games in a doubleheader on February 8, 1997, against the Stetson Hatters, both of which they won.

In the inaugural year of the Florida Softball program, Ray's team posted an overall win–loss record of 42–25 and a Southeastern Conference record of 16–8, and was the runner-up in the SEC softball tournament, ultimately losing to the second-ranked South Carolina Gamecocks in the title game. Florida built on the early success of their first season to win the program's first-ever SEC regular season championship in 1998, and advance to the NCAA tournament. After the 2000 season, Ray left Florida to return to an assistant coaching position with the Arizona Wildcats softball team at the University of Arizona, where he previously coached.

=== Karen Johns era: (2001–2005) ===
For the 2001 season, Ray was replaced by Karen Johns. Under Johns, Florida qualified for the NCAA tournament four of five seasons, and compiled a record of 192–131 during her tenure in Gainesville. After the Gators finished third in the SEC Eastern Division for the fourth straight season, and suffered four consecutive losses in the 2005 SEC Tournament and the opening round of the NCAA tournament, Johns was fired.

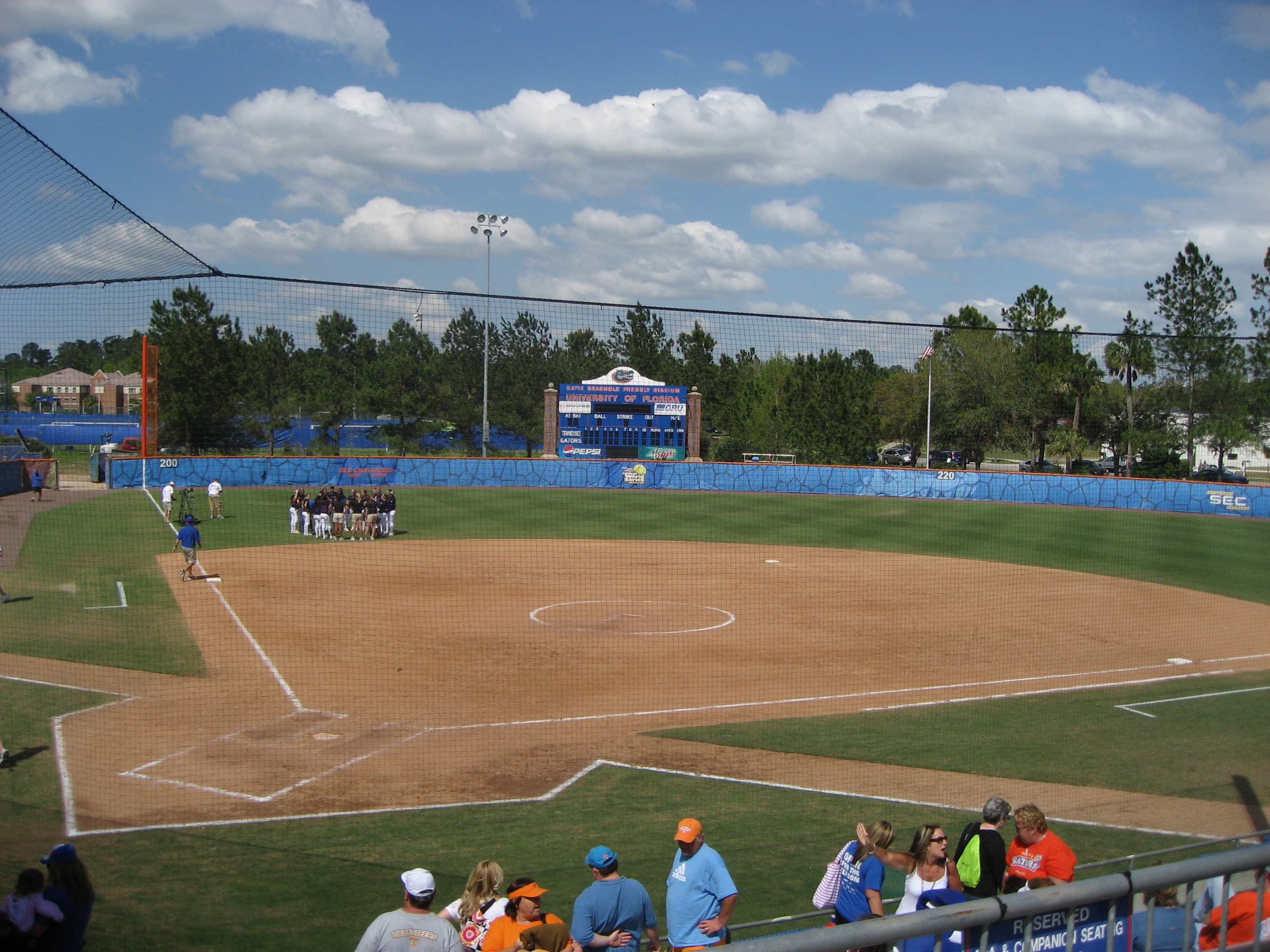
Katie Seashole Pressly Softball Stadium, the Gainesville, Florida home field of the Florida Gators softball team.

=== Tim Walton era: (2006–present) ===
To replace Johns, Florida athletic director Jeremy Foley hired the then-head coach of the Wichita State Shockers softball team, Tim Walton, as the Gators' new coach. Under Walton, the Florida softball team has become a consistent SEC and national title contender. In 2014, the Gators won their first national title over Alabama, and the following year they repeated as national champions, this time by defeating Michigan.

==== 2008 World Series ====
In his third season as the Gators' head coach, he led the team to an NCAA single season record seventy wins and five losses. The team also made its first-ever Women's College World Series (WCWS) appearance after beating the California Golden Bears, two games to none, in the Gainesville Super Regional of the NCAA tournament. After losing its opening game of the WCWS to Louisiana Lafayette, the Gators won three straight against games the Virginia Tech Hokies and Texas A&M Aggies. However, in the double-elimination format of the NCAA tournament, the Gators needed to beat Texas A&M twice in the WCWS semifinals to move into the championship final series. That second semifinal game went two extra innings before either team scored, and the Aggies earned the 1–0 victory in the ninth inning. Gators pitcher Stacey Nelson ended the 2008 season with single-season school records in wins (47), strikeouts (363), innings pitched (352.1), and earned run average (0.75).

==== 2009 World Series ====
Florida began its 2009 season ranked No. 1 in the country in both major college softball polls, but finished second after falling 8–0 and 3–2 to the Washington Huskies in the best-of-three-games final championship series of the 2009 Women's College World Series. The Gators compiled an overall record of 63–5 and completed its SEC regular season with a record of 26–1. They also broke the SEC single-season record for home runs (86), and several single-season team records including grand slams (12), total shutouts (39), and consecutive shutouts (11). Aja Paculba set the single-season stolen base record (27), Francesca Enea broke the career home run record (41) in her junior season, and the Florida pitching staff threw three no-hitters in the regular season (Stephanie Brombacher vs. Coastal Carolina; Stacey Nelson vs. Ole Miss and Arkansas). Nelson was named the Lowe's Senior CLASS Award winner and the SEC Pitcher of the year for the second straight year. Nelson was named to the All-American first team (pitcher), and Brombacher (pitcher), Enea (outfielder), Kelsey Bruder (outfielder), and Paculba (second baseman) were named to the second team.

==== 2010 World Series ====
The 2010 Florida softball team again qualified for the NCAA tournament and advanced to the 2010 Women's College World Series. In the opening game of the Series, the fourth-seeded Gators were decisively defeated 16–3 by the UCLA Bruins, who ultimately won the 2010 championship. The Gators recovered to eliminate the ninth-seeded Missouri Tigers 5–2, before being edged 3–2 and eliminated in turn by the sixth-seeded Georgia Bulldogs.

==== 2011 World Series ====
During the 2011 season, Florida experienced a series of up-and-down streaks, but recovered to win the SEC Eastern Division for the fourth consecutive year. After being upset by the Auburn Tigers in the first round of the SEC tournament, the Gators qualified for the NCAA tournament and advanced to the 2011 Women's College World Series. In the World Series semi-finals, Florida twice defeated the SEC champion Alabama Crimson Tide, 16–2 and 9–2, to advance to the finals. The top-ranked Arizona State Sun Devils, in turn, swept the Gators, 14–4 and 7–2, in the best-of-three championship finals.

==== 2012 NCAA tournament ====
On the eve of the NCAA tournament, three players: Cheyenne Coyle, Sami Fagan, and Kasey Fagan were dismissed from the team. No. 5 Florida lost to Florida Gulf Coast and USF in the Regionals and failed to reach the WCWS for the first time in Walton's tenure at UF.

==== 2013 World Series ====
Despite winning the SEC regular season and tournament titles, No. 2 Florida lost to Tennessee 2–9 to open the WCWS. After a thrilling 9–8 extra innings game win against Nebraska, they lost 0–3 to Texas to end their season.

==== 2014 National Champs ====
Florida beat rival Alabama for their first national championship with tournament MVP Hannah Rogers in the circle.

==== 2015 National Champs ====
Led by the USA Softball Collegiate Player of the Year in Lauren Haeger, Florida became just the third team in the history of college softball to win back-to-back national championships. They defeated Michigan in the last game of the best of three series 4–1 to win the title. Haeger then went on to win the 2015 Honda Award.

2017 World Series In 2017, Florida again secured the number one seed for the third straight year. After failing to make it to the WCWS in 2016 as the number one seed, Florida made it to the finals. In the finals, Florida took on rival Oklahoma, the number 10 overall seed. In game one, Oklahoma outlasted Florida after 17 innings in the longest WCWS game ever. The following day, Florida lost 4–5, and Oklahoma won the 2017 WCWS.

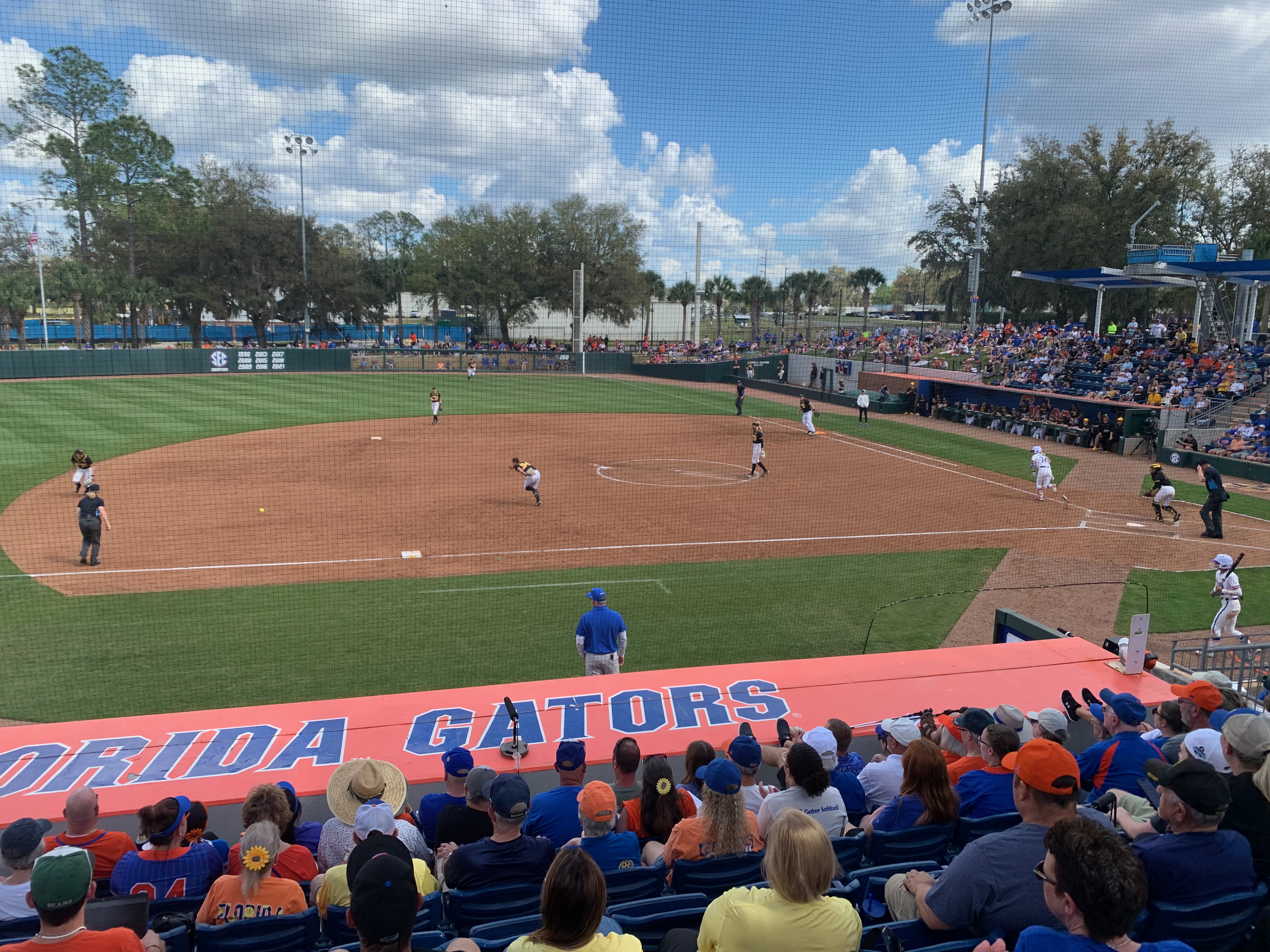
Ella Wesolowski records a hit to left field

== Coaching staff ==
Name	Position coached	Consecutive season at Florida in current position
Tim Walton	Head coach	18th
Aric Thomas	Assistant coach and Recruiting Coordinator	7th
Stephanie VanBrakle Prothro	Assistant coach and Pitching Coach	1st
Francesca Enea	Assistant coach	2nd

== Facility upgrades ==
In September 2016, the UAA announced a massive $100 million facilities initiative that included renovating many areas of the University of Florida's sports landscape. One of the improvements included in the plan was a renovation of the softball complex at Seashole Pressly Stadium. The plan states that existing bleachers behind home plate would be replaced with chairback seating, with additional bleachers extended down each foul line to accommodate 750 to 1,000 more seats; expanded press box, concession and restroom areas, upgraded coaches and players' facilities, as well as some shade structure. The university hopes to complete these projects before 2021.

== Year-by-year results ==
Season	Overall record	SEC record	NCAA tournament Results	SEC Tournament Results	SEC Regular season Finish	NCAA tournament Seed
1997	42–25	16–8	Did Not Make	W 6–2 vs. Alabama; L 1–6 vs. No. 2 South Carolina; W 2–1 vs. Tennessee; W 4–3 vs. No. 23 LSU; W 7–5 vs. Auburn; L 0–8 vs. No. 2 South Carolina	3rd East Division	
1998	47–22	23–5	L 0–1 vs. No. 6 South Florida; L 0–1 vs. No 16 Arizona State	W 3–1 vs Georgia; W 10–9 vs. South Carolina; L 0–1 vs. Mississippi State; L 0–1 vs. Mississippi State	1st SEC	
1999	34–39	13–15	Did Not Make	L 3–11 vs. No. 24 Tennessee; L 1–4 vs. Alabama	3rd East Division	
2000	46–30	13–14	L 0–2 vs. No 10 California; W 1–0 vs. No 6 Fresno State; W 5–2 vs. Texas; L 1–2 vs. No 10 California	L 0–1 vs. No 11 Alabama; W 2–0 vs. Kentucky; L 1–2 vs. Arkansas	2nd East Division	
2001	37–28	14–15	L 0–3 vs. FAU; W 8–0 vs. UConn; L 2–6 vs. No 16 Florida State	L 0–1 vs. Mississippi State; L 1–4 vs. Auburn	2nd East Division	
2002	32–35	12–18	Did Not Make	L 0–5 vs. No 3 LSU; L 1–7 vs. Auburn	3rd East Division	
2003	41–25	19–11	W 3–2 vs. Oregon State; L 0–2 vs. Texas-Arlington; L 1–2 vs. FAU	W 6–2 vs. No 19/20 South Carolina; W 1–0 vs. No 7/9 Georgia; L 0–1 vs. No 12/13 LSU; L 1–3 vs. No 12/13 LSU	3rd East Division	
2004	41–20	16–13	L 1–2 vs. Cal State-Northridge; W 4–0 vs. Long Island; L 1–8 vs. No 17/19 South Florida	L 1–7 vs. No 10/11 Georgia; L 5–7 vs. No 10/11 Tennessee	3rd East Division	
Start of National Seeding
2005	41–23	18–12	L 2–3 vs. Bethune–Cookman; L 3–5 vs. UCF	L 0–4 vs. No 11/13 Tennessee; L 1–9 vs. LSU	3rd East Division	No. 13
2006	43–25	17–13	L 0–2 vs. FAU; W 1–0 vs. North Carolina; L 0–1 vs. FAU	L 0–6 vs. Tennessee	3rd East Division	No. 16
2007	50–22	17–11	W 8–0 vs. Stetson; W 3–0 vs. No 17 Georgia Tech; W 3–0 vs. No 18 Texas; L 0–2 vs. No 7 Texas A&M; W 3–2 vs. No 7 Texas A&M; L 0–2 vs. No 7 Texas A&M	W 3–0 vs. Mississippi State; W 1–0 vs. No 1 Tennessee; L 0–1 vs. No 5/6 LSU	2nd East Division	No. 13
2008	70–5	27–1	W 7–2 vs. Georgia Tech; W 3–0 vs. UCF; L 0–1 vs. UCF; W 10–0 vs. UCF; W 4–2 vs. No 24/25 California; W 4–2 vs. No 24/25 California; L 2–3 vs. No 16/17 Louisiana-Lafayette*; W 2–0 vs. No 16/17 Virginia Tech*; W 2–0 vs. No 3/5 UCLA*; W 6–1 vs. No 4/5 Texas A&M*; L 0–1 vs. No 4/5 Texas A&M*	W 1–0 vs. Ole Miss; W 6–1 vs. No 12/13 Tennessee; W 4–1 vs. No 3 Alabama; SEC Tournament Champs	1st SEC	No. 1
2009	63–5	26–1	W 12–0 vs. Florida A&M; W 7–1 vs. Texas A&M; W 9–0 vs. Lehigh; W 2–0 vs. No 14 California; W 2–1 vs No 14 California; W 3–0 vs No 6 Arizona*; W 1–0 vs No 7 Michigan*; W 6–5 vs No 4 Alabama* FINALS: L 0–8 vs No 3 Washington*; L 2–3 vs No 3 Washington*	W 3–0 vs. Auburn; W 11–3 vs. No 18 Tennessee; W 8–5 vs. No 5 Alabama; SEC Tournament Champs	1st SEC	No. 1
2010	49–10	20–4	W 6–0 vs. Bethune–Cookman; W 6–0 vs. UCF; W 13–3 vs. FIU; W 8–0 vs. No 10/11 Arizona State; W 5–2 vs No 10/11 Arizona State; L 3–16 vs No 5/4 UCLA*; W 5–0 vs No 8/14 Missouri*; L 2–3 vs No 9 Georgia*	W 9–1 vs. Auburn; L 1–9 vs. No 17/11 LSU	1st East Division	No. 4
2011	56–13	21–7	W 8–0 vs. Bethune–Cookman; W 4–2 vs. No 14 UCLA; L 2–3 vs. No 14 UCLA; W 11–3 vs. No 14 UCLA; W 9–1 vs. No 11 Oregon; W 7–0 vs No 11 Oregon; W 6–2 vs No 5 Missouri*; L 5–6 vs No 1 Arizona State*; W 16–2 vs No 2 Alabama*; W 9–2 vs No 2 Alabama* FINALS: L 4–14 vs No 1 Arizona State*; L 2–7 vs No 1 Arizona State*	L 2–6 vs. No 24 Auburn	1st East Division	No. 4
2012	48–13	21–7	L 1–2 vs. FGCU; W 7–1 vs. UCF; W 6–2 vs. FGCU; L 0–1 vs. No 22 USF	W 1–0 vs. LSU; W 2–1 vs. No 3 Tennessee; L 1–10 vs. No 4 Alabama	2nd East Division	No. 5
2013	58–9	18–6	W 7–1 vs. Hampton; W 11–1 vs. No 22 USF; W 2–0 vs. No 22 USF; W 4–3 vs. UAB; W 1–0 vs. UAB; L 2–9 vs. No 5 Tennessee*; W 9–8 vs. No 16/17 Nebraska*; L 0–3 vs. No 6/7 Texas*	W 8–4 vs. No 9/10 Alabama; W 9–5 vs. No 23 Georgia; W 10–4 No 7/8 Missouri; SEC Tournament Champs	1st SEC	No. 2
2014	55–12	15–9	W 8–0 vs. Florida A&M; W 14–0 vs. Stetson; W 7–0 vs. UCF; W 9–0 vs. No 8/9 Washington; L 3–4 vs. No 8/9 Washington; W 8–0 vs. No 8/9 Washington; W 11–0 vs. No 17 Baylor*; W 4–0 vs. No 1 Oregon*; W 6–3 No 17 Baylor* FINALS: W 5–0 vs. No 5 Alabama*; W 6–3 vs. No 5 Alabama*; National champions	L 0–2 vs. No 11/14 Georgia	T-3rd SEC	No. 5
2015	60–7	18–5	W 6–0 vs. Florida A&M; W 7–0 vs. Hofstra; W 1–0 vs. FAU; W 7–0 vs. No 25 Kentucky; W 1–0 vs. No 25 Kentucky; W 7–2 vs. No 10 Tennessee*; W 4–0 vs. No 8 LSU*; W 3–2 vs. No 4 Auburn*; FINALS: W 3–2 vs. No 3 Michigan*; L 0–1 vs. No 3 Michigan*; W 4–1 vs. No 3 Michigan*; National champions	W 10–2 vs. South Carolina; L 1–2 vs. No 11 Tennessee	1st SEC	No. 1
2016	56–7	20–4	W 11–0 vs. Alabama State; W 5–0 vs. UCF; W 8–0 vs. UCF; L 0–3 vs. No 16 Georgia; L 2–3 vs. No 16 Georgia	W 1–0 vs. Ole Miss; L 1–2 vs. No 8 Auburn	1st SEC	No. 1
2017	58–10	20–3	W 9–0 vs. Florida A&M; W 2–0 vs. OSU; L 0–1 vs. OSU; W 5–0 vs. OSU; L 0–3 vs. No 16 Alabama; W 2–0 vs. No 16 Alabama; W 2–1 vs. No 16 Alabama; W 8–0 vs. No 9 Texas A&M*; W 7–0 vs. No 8 LSU*; W 5–2 vs. No 6 Washington*; FINALS: L 5–7 ^{(17)} vs. No 10 OU*; L 4–5 vs. No 10 OU*	L 0–2 vs. Ole Miss	1st SEC	No. 1
2018	56–11	20–4	W 8–0 vs. Bethune–Cookman; W 10–2 vs. OSU; W 4–0 vs. OSU; W 5–4 vs. No 15 Texas A&M; L 4–5 vs. No 15 Texas A&M; W 5–3 vs. No 15 Texas A&M; W 11–3 vs. No 7 Georgia*; L 5–6 vs. No 3 UCLA*; L 0–2 vs. No 4 OU*	W 5–2 vs. No 13/15 Alabama; W 10–2 vs. No 7/8 Tennessee; W 3–1 No 12/14 South Carolina; SEC Tournament Champs	1st SEC	No. 2
2019	49–18	12–12	W 3–0 vs. Boston University; W 8–0 ^{(5)} vs. Boise State; W 5–0 vs. Boise State; W 3–0 vs. No 12 Tennessee; L 2–3 ^{(9)} vs. No 12 Tennessee; W 2–1 ^{(8)} vs. No 12 Tennessee; L 1–2 vs. No 13 Oklahoma State*; L 3–15 ^{(5)} vs. No 8 Alabama*	W 6–5 vs. South Carolina; W 3–0 vs. LSU; W 3–0 vs. Auburn; W 2–1 vs. Alabama; SEC Tournament Champs	T-6th SEC	No. 5
2020	23–4	3–0	2020 Season Canceled	2020 Season Canceled		Canceled
2021	45–11	19–5	W 1–0 vs. South Florida; W 10–0 vs. South Alabama; W 8–0 vs. South Florida; L 0–4 vs. Georgia; L 0–6 vs. Georgia	W 6–2 vs. Mississippi State; W 7–6 vs. Missouri; L 0–4 vs. Alabama	T-1st SEC	No. 4
2022	49–19	13–11	W 10–1 vs. Canisius College; W 7–1 vs. Georgia Tech; W 11–0 vs. Wisconsin; L 0–6 vs. No 3 Virginia Tech; W 7–2 vs. No 3 Virginia Tech; W 12–0 vs. No 3 Virginia Tech; W 7–1 vs. Oregon State*; L 0–2 vs. No 7 Oklahoma State*; L 0–8 vs. No 5 UCLA*	W 4-1 vs. Texas A&M; W 9–3 vs. Kentucky; L 1–4 vs. Arkansas	T-4th SEC	No. 14
2023	38–22	11–13	W 3–2 vs. Loyola Marymount (CA); L 0–8 (6) vs. No 9 Stanford; W 10–6 vs. Loyola Marymount (CA); L 2–11 vs. No 9 Stanford	W 6–2 vs. Kentucky; L 0–4 vs. Tennessee	8th SEC	
2024	54–15	17–7	W 6–0 vs. FCGU; W 9–1 vs. South Alabama; W 9–1 vs. South Alabama; W 4–2 vs. Baylor; L 2–5 vs. Baylor; W 5–3 vs. Baylor; W 1–0 vs. No. 5 Oklahoma State*; L 0–10 (5) vs. No. 1 Texas*; W 9–3 vs. No. 2 Oklahoma*; L 5–6 (8) vs. No. 2 Oklahoma*	W 9–4 vs. No. 7 Georgia; W 7–3 vs. No. 3 Texas A&M; W 6–1 vs. No 5.Missouri; SEC Tournament Champs	2nd SEC	No. 4
2025	48–17	14–10	Regional: W 8–0 (5) vs. Mercer; W 14–6 (5) vs, FAU; W 8–0 (5) vs. Mercer; Super Regional: W 6–1 vs. Georgia; L 1–2 vs. Georgia; W 5–2 vs. Georgia; WCWS: L 0–3 vs. Texas; L 3–11 (5) vs. Tennessee	L 3–6 Ole Miss	T-5th SEC	No. 3
2026	48-10	17-7	Regional: May 15 vs. Florida A&M	W 10-9 vs. 14-seed Auburn L 1-9 (5) vs. 2-seed Alabama	3rd SEC	No. 6
*Women's College World Series						

=== NCAA tournament seeding history ===
National seeding began in 2005. The Florida Gators have been a national seed in 18 of the 19 tournaments.

Years →	'05	'06	'07	'08	'09	'10	'11	'12	'13	'14	'15	'16	'17	'18	'19	'21	'22	'24	'25	'26
Seeds →	13	16	13	1	1	4	4	5	2	5	1	1	1	2	5	4	14	4	3	6

=== College World Series ===
Florida has advanced to the Women's College World Series 13 times, winning the title in 2014 and 2015 and finished as runner-up in 2009, 2011, and 2017.

Year	Win	Loss	Percent
2008	3	2	.600
2009	3	2	.600
2010	1	2	.333
2011	4	3	.571
2013	1	2	.333
2014	5	0	1.000
2015	5	1	.833
2017	3	2	.600
2018	1	2	.333
2019	0	2	.000
2022	1	2	.333
2024	3	2	.600
2025	0	2	.000
Total	30	24	.556

== Player awards ==
=== National awards ===
USA Softball Collegiate Player of the Year

- Lauren Haeger (2015)
- Kelly Barnhill (2017)

NFCA National Player of the Year

- Skylar Wallace (2023)
- Jocelyn Erickson (2024)

NFCA National Freshman of the Year

- Amanda Lorenz (2016)
- Taylor Shumaker (2025)

Softball America Freshman of the Year

- Taylor Shumaker (2025)

Softball America Defensive Player of the Year

- Jocelyn Erickson (2024)
- Kendra Falby (2025)

NFCA Catcher of the Year

- Jocelyn Erickson (2024)

Honda Sports Award

- Kelly Barnhill (2017)
- Lauren Haeger (2015)

Senior CLASS Award

- Stacey Nelson (2009)

Elite 90 Award

- Korbe Otis (2025)

Rawlings Gold Glove Award®, presented by the NFCA

- Hannah Adams (2022)
- Jocelyn Erickson (2024)
- Kendra Falby (2024)
- Jocelyn Erickson (2025)
- Kendra Falby (2025)

=== Conference awards ===
SEC Player of the Year

- Chelsea Sakizzie (1998)
- Kristen Butler (2006)
- Kelsey Bruder (2011)
- Michelle Moultrie (2012)
- Kelsey Stewart (2015)
- Amanda Lorenz (2018)
- Skylar Wallace (2023)
- Jocelyn Erickson (2024)

SEC Pitcher of the Year

- Stacy Nelson (2008, 2009)
- Lauren Haeger (2015)
- Kelly Barnhill (2017, 2018)

SEC Freshman of the Year

- Mandy Schuerman (2002)
- Amanda Lorenz (2016)
- Keagan Rothrock (2024)

SEC Scholar-Athlete of the Year

- Korbe Otis (2025)

== All-Americans ==
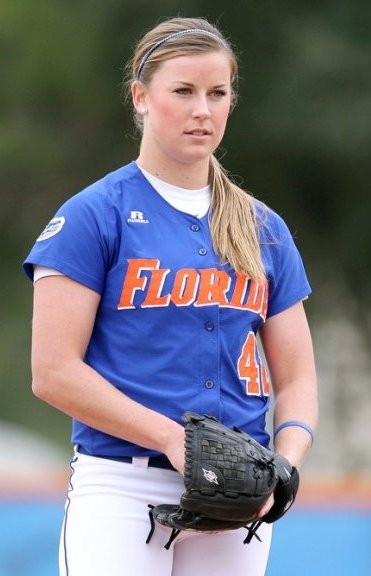
Stacey Nelson

The Florida Gators softball program has produced 43 Louisville Slugger/NFCA All-American selections.

- Chelsey Sakizzie – 1998 3rd team
- Stacey Nelson – 2007 2nd team
- Kim Waleszonia – 2007 3rd team
- Francesca Enea – 2008 2nd team
- Ali Gardiner – 2008 1st team
- Stacey Nelson – 2008 1st team
- Aja Paculba – 2008 2nd team
- Kim Waleszonia – 2008 3rd team
- Stephanie Brombacher – 2009 2nd team
- Kelsey Bruder – 2009 2nd team
- Francesca Enea – 2009 2nd team
- Stacey Nelson – 2009 1st team
- Aja Paculba – 2009 2nd team
- Francesca Enea – 2010 2nd team
- Stephanie Brombacher – 2010 3rd team
- Megan Bush – 2011 1st team
- Kelsey Bruder – 2011 1st team
- Brittany Schutte – 2011 1st team
- Hannah Rogers – 2011 2nd team
- Aja Paculba – 2011 3rd team
- Michelle Moultrie – 2012 1st team
- Hannah Rogers – 2012 2nd team
- Hannah Rogers – 2013 1st team
- Lauren Haeger – 2013 1st team
- Kelsey Stewart – 2014 1st team
- Hannah Rogers – 2014 3rd team
- Lauren Haeger – 2015 1st team
- Kelsey Stewart – 2015 1st team
- Aleshia Ocasio – 2015 3rd team
- Delanie Gourley – 2016 1st team
- Aleshia Ocasio – 2016 1st team
- Kayli Kvistad – 2016 2nd team
- Amanda Lorenz – 2016 3rd team
- Kelly Barnhill – 2017 1st team
- Delanie Gourley – 2017 1st team
- Amanda Lorenz – 2017 1st team
- Kayli Kvistad – 2017 3rd team
- Jocelyn Erickson – 2024 1st team
- Korbe Otis – 2024 1st team
- Skylar Wallace – 2024 2nd team
- Keagan Rothrock – 2024 3rd team
- Reagan Walsh – 2024 3rd team
- Taylor Shumaker - 2025 1st team
- Kendra Falby - 2025 2nd team
- Mia Williams - 2025 2nd team

== 2020 U.S. Olympic Team ==
- Michelle Moultrie
- Aubree Munro
- Kelsey Stewart

== Records ==
Statistic	Individual Single Season		Individual Career		Team Single Game		Team Single Season	
Hitting Records
Highest Batting average	.407	Ali Gardiner 2008	.351	Aja Paculba	–	–	.323	2009
Highest Slugging Percentage	.713	Kelsey Bruder 2009	.595	Francesca Enea	–	–	.543	2009
Highest On Base Percentage	.508	Ali Gardiner 2008	.464	Aja Paculba	–	–	.423	2009
Highest Stolen Base Percentage	–	–	.944	Emily Marino	–	–	.858 (97–113)	2000
Most At Bats	249	Kim Waleszonia 2008	813	Lara Pinkerton	43	vs Temple 3/4/1999	1953	2008
Most Runs Scored	69	Aja Paculba 2009	166	Kim Waleszonia	19	vs Florida A&M 4/5/1998	431	2009
Most Hits	88	Kim Waleszonia 2007; Ali Gardiner 2008	272	Kim Waleszonia	20	vs Florida A&M 4/5/1998	597	2008
Most Doubles	20	Ashley Boone 2001	59	Ashley Boone	6	vs Centenary 2/2/2003 vs LSU 3/29/2008	102	2008
Most Triples	5	Kristin Sandler 1998; Kim Waleszonia 2007, 2008; Aja Paculba 2009	17	Kim Waleszonia	4	vs Birmingham–Southern 2/14/2003	17	2003
Most Home Runs	18	Francesca Enea 2009	41	Francesca Enea	6	vs Campbell Fighting Camels 2/19/2010	86	2009
Most Runs Batted In	71	Francesca Enea 2009	157	Francesca Enea	–	–	396	2009
Most Total Bases	139	Kelsey Bruder 2009	377	Lindsay Cameron	30	vs Kentucky 5/7/2005	925	2009
Most Walks	49	Aja Paculba 2009	138	Emily Marino	12	vs Georgia 3/11/2009	274	2009
Most Times Hit By Pitch	13	Lauren Roussell 2005	32	Lauren Roussell	4	7 Times, Most Recently vs Alabama 5/9/2009	59	2006
Most Times Struck Out	65	Jackie Griffin 1999	169	Lacie Howard	22	vs Tennessee 3/10/2007	383	2006
Most Sacrifice Flies	6	Francesca Enea 2008	11	Francesca Enea	2	14 Times, Most Recently vs Tennessee 5/3/2008	24	2008
Most Sacrifice Hits	21	Nicole Kreipl 2000	48	Nicole Kreipl	5	vs Alabama 4/15/2000	74	2000
Most Stolen Bases	27	Aja Paculba 2009	65	Kim Waleszonia	12	vs Mississippi State 4/27/2003	129	2007
Most Stolen Base Attempts	–	–	78	Kim Waleszonia	12	vs Mississippi State 4/27/2003	–	–
Pitching Records
Lowest ERA	0.61	Stacey Nelson 2009	0.99	Stacey Nelson	–	–	.69	2009
Lowest Opponent Batting Average	.146	Jenny Gladding 2004	.174	Jenny Gladding	–	–	.161	2009
Fewest Walks Allowed/7 Innings	0.71	Chelsey Sakizzie 1998	0.81	Chelsey Sakizzie	–	–	1.22	1997
Most Strikeouts/7 Innings	9.91	Jenny Gladding 2004	8.61	Jenny Gladding	–	–	8.62	2009
Highest Winning Percentage	1.000	Stephanie Brombacher 2008, 2009	1.000	Stephanie Brombacher	–	–	.933	2008
Most Wins	47	Stacey Nelson 2008	136	Stacey Nelson	–	–	70	2008
Most Losses	19	Beth Dieter 1999	43	Beth Dieter	–	–	5 (Fewest)	2008; 2009
Most Saves	5	Stacey Nelson 2006, 2007, 2008	18	Stacey Nelson	–	–	8	2005; 2008
Most Appearances	59	Stacey Nelson 2008	206	Stacey Nelson	–	–	–	–
Most Games Started	49	Stacey Nelson 2008	156	Stacey Nelson	–	–	–	–
Most Complete Games	43	Stacey Nelson 2008	133	Stacey Nelson	–	–	54	2000
Most Shutouts	22	Stacey Nelson 2009	58	Stacey Nelson	–	–	39	2009
Innings Pitched	352.1	Stacey Nelson 2008	1141.1	Stacey Nelson	11.0	3 Times, Most Recently vs Tennessee 5/3/2008	512.1	2000; 2008
Most Hits Allowed	263	Beth Dieter 1999	747	Stacey Stevens	21	vs Tennessee 4/2/1999	250 (Fewest)	2009
Most Doubles Allowed	–	–	–	–	6	vs Alabama 3/14/2007	34 (Fewest)	2009
Most Triples Allowed	–	–	–	–	2	10 Times, Most Recently vs Oregon 2/11/2006	1 (Fewest)	2004; 2007; 2008
Most Home Runs Allowed	–	–	–	–	3	8 Times, Most Recently vs Illinois 2/24/2006	6 (Fewest)	2009
Most Runs Allowed	125	Beth Dieter 1999	344	Stacey Stevens	18	vs Tennessee 4/2/1999	67 (Fewest)	2009
Most Earned Runs Allowed	98	Beth Dieter 1999	257	Stacey Stevens	14	vs Tennessee 4/2/1999	44 (Fewest)	2009
Most Walks Allowed	116	Stacey Nelson 2008	285	Stacey Nelson	11	vs Arkansas 3/25/2000	80 (Fewest)	1997
Most Strikeouts	363	Stacey Nelson 2008	1116	Stacey Nelson	17	vs Samford 2/20/2000	547	2009
Most Strikeouts Looking	83	Stacey Nelson 2008	249	Stacey Nelson	7	3 Times, Most Recently vs Connecticut 2/28/2004	156	2009
Most Batters Faced	1399	Stacey Nelson 2008	4504	Stacey Nelson	52	vs Tennessee 5/3/2008	2161	2000
Most At Bats Against	1222	Stacey Nelson 2008	3038	Stacey Stevens	–	–	1905	2000
Most Wild Pitches	21	Renise Landry 2001	49	Renise Landry; Stacey Nelson	5	vs Georgia 4/13/2002	55	2002
Most Hit Batters	28	Stacey Nelson 2008	83	Stacey Nelson	–	–	44	2008
Fielding Records
Highest Fielding Percentage	1.000	Ashlie Goble 2003; Brooke Johnson 2007	.993	Kristina Hilberth	–	–	.977	2009
Lowest Stolen Bases Against Percentage	.457	Kristen Butler 2003; Jenny Gladding 2003	.510	Jenny Gladding	–	–	.517	2003
Most Chances	563	Ali Gardiner 2008	1742	Ashley Boone	54	vs Georgia Southern 3/2/2001	2232	2008
Most Putouts	529	Ali Gardiner 2008	1638	Ashley Boone	33	vs Georgia Southern 3/2/2001	1537	2000
Most Assists	163	Lauren Roussell 2007	544	Jennifer Massadeghi	19	3 Times, Most Recently vs Tennessee 5/3/2008	671	2001
Most Errors	30	Jennifer Massadeghi 2000	66	Jennifer Massadeghi	6	vs LSU 5/13/2005	43 (Fewest)	2009
Most Double Plays Turned	22	Ali Gardiner 2007	60	Melissa Zick	3	vs Arkansas 3/20/2005	26	2007
Most Caught Stealing By	22	Kristen Butler 2006	61	Kristen Butler	3	3 Times, Most Recently vs Alabama 3/14/2007	29	2003
Most Stolen Bases Against	42	Bobbie Molyneux 1997	112	Emily Marino	8	vs Georgia 4/14/2001	57	2001
Most Passed Balls	15	Kristen Butler 2005	39	Kristen Butler	3	vs Georgia 5/4/1997	16	2005
Most Runners Picked off	8	Kristen Butler 2003; Breanne Berger 2002	22	Kristen Butler	–	–	–	–
SEC Single Season Record. NCAA Single Season Record.

== See also ==
- Florida Gators
- Florida Gators baseball
- History of the University of Florida
- List of University of Florida Athletic Hall of Fame members
- University Athletic Association
- List of NCAA Division I softball programs
