= List of Mexican Baseball League team rosters =

Below are the full rosters and coaching staff of the teams of Minor League Baseball's Mexican League.

== North Division ==
=== Algodoneros de Unión Laguna ===
Algodoneros de Unión Laguna roster
Players	Coaches/Other
Pitchers: 60 Fernando Abad; 46 Omar Araujo; 51 Jaime Barría; -- Guadalupe Chávez; 55 Josh Corrales; -- Danis Correa; -- Tiago da Silva; 14 Grant Gavin; 72 Santiago Gutiérrez; -- Katsunori Hirai; 70 Travis Lakins Sr.; 40 Miguel León; 35 Yoan López; 95 Thomas McIlraith; 37 Aldo Montes; 62 Darien Núñez; 30 Joel Rangel; 83 Jesús Reyes; 57 Ricardo Sánchez; 20 Nick Snyder; 76 José Torres; 32 Joe Van Meter; 47 Taylor Williams; Catchers: 12 Hendrik Clementina; 14 Javier Figueroa; 16 Gael Guzmán; 25 Dean Nevárez; Infielders: 5 Greg Bird; -- Jorge Franco; 18 Didi Gregorius; 70 Albert Lara; 36 Drew Lugbauer; 59 Daniel Palka; 36 Alfonso Rivas; 8 Jonathan Schoop; 99 Adrián Tovalín; Outfielders: 3 Julian Escobedo; 31 Valentín Hernández; 7 Ramón Mora; 38 Brian O'Grady; 92 Mark Payton; 66 Edgar Robles	Manager: -- Fernando Tatís; Coaches: 63 Antonio Aguilera; 48 Michel Enríquez; 33 Ernesto Espinoza; 52 Jesús Manso; 45 Alfredo Meza; 19 Javier Robles; 69 Arturo Ruiz; 7-day injured list; ~ Development list; # Rehab assignment; ∞ Reserve list; ‡ Restricted list; § Suspended list; † Temporarily inactive list; Roster updated February 20, 2026; Transactions; → More rosters: MiLB • Mexican League

=== Acereros de Monclova ===
Acereros de Monclova roster
Players	Coaches/Other
Pitchers: 29 R. J. Alaniz; -- Ivan Armstrong; 17 Édgar Arredondo ∞; 88 Jake Barrett ∞; 57 Christian Cosby; 16 Chavez Fernander; -- Ryley Gilliam; -- Jorge Guzmán ∞; -- Mike Kickham; 93 Jonathan López; 3 Brady Miller; 94 Rolando Mora; 99 Francisco Morales; 80 Chris Muller; 51 Estalin Ortiz; 90 Chester Pimentel; -- Gabriel Rodríguez; 69 Jorge Rodríguez; 71 Luis Rico; 62 Hector Santiago ∞; 1 Mark Simon; 75 Oscar Soría; 45 Jorge Tavárez; 64 Julio Vivas; 33 Austin Warner; 32 Brac Warren; Catchers: 15 Santiago Chávez; 30 Fernando Flores; 10 Logan Moore; Infielders: 48 Rodolfo Amador; 12 Elvin Carrillo; 37 Aldrem Corredor; 59 Abiam Cruz; 70 Juan Mora; 55 Aldo Nuñez; 18 José Peraza; 39 Juan Perez; -- Alan Trejo; Outfielders: 23 Braulio Cavero; 95 Bryan Corral; 47 Romer Cuadrado; -- Eric Filia; 66 Jecksson Flores; 5 Luis González; 58 Jhailyn Ortiz; 82 Magneuris Sierra	Manager: -- Juan Castro; Coaches: -- Martín Arzate (coach); 51 Jose Hommy Castro (first base); -- Carlos Gastélum (third base); -- José Macías (hitting); -- Isidro Márquez (pitching); -- Julio César Miranda (coach); 5 Charles Poe (bench); -- Salvador Robles (bullpen); 7-day injured list; ~ Development list; # Rehab assignment; ∞ Reserve list; ‡ Restricted list; § Suspended list; † Temporarily inactive list; Roster updated February 14, 2026; Transactions; → More rosters: MiLB • Mexican League

=== Caliente de Durango ===
Caliente de Durango roster
Players	Coaches/Other
Pitchers: 97 Felipe Acosta; -- Néstor Anguamea; 26 Baltazar Arredondo; 46 Jorge Bautista; -- Esteban Bloch; 100 Erick Casillas; -- José De León; -- Odrisamer Despaigne; 23 Félix Doubront; 57 Fernando Estrella; -- Jay Groome; 19 Ricardo Hernández; 10 Isaac Jiménez; 00 R.J. Martínez; 81 Irving Medina; 13 Ozzie Méndez; 58 Jonathan Partida; -- Luis Payán; -- Todd Peterson; 44 Luis Rijo; -- Denny Román; 33 Tanner Tully; 90 Edwyn Valle; 19 Saúl Vázquez; Catchers: 4 Alejandro Urías; Infielders: 78 Armando Álvarez; 10 Edwin García; -- David Hensley; 64 César Hernández; 76 C.J. Hinojosa; 16 Victor Márquez; -- Gabriel Noriega; -- Webster Rivas; 2 Alejandro Rivera; -- Reynaldo Rodríguez; -- Jonathan Villar; Outfielders: 18 Oswaldo Arcia; -- Marek Chlup; -- Ronnie Dawson; 42 Jorge García; 77 Santiago González; 33 Elmer Lopez; -- Manuel Orduño; 1 Nick Williams	Manager: -- Ramón Valdez; Coaches: -- Antonio Aguilera (batting); 9 Efrén Espinoza (third base); -- Juan Antonio Peña (bullpen); 15 Ignacio Rodríguez (pitching); -- Miguel Torrero (first base); -- Lino Urdaneta (assistant); 7-day injured list; ~ Development list; # Rehab assignment; ∞ Reserve list; ‡ Restricted list; § Suspended list; † Temporarily inactive list; Roster updated February 9, 2026; Transactions; → More rosters: MiLB • Mexican League

=== Charros de Jalisco ===
Charros de Jalisco roster
Players		Coaches
Pitchers: 60 (Mexico) Miguel Aguilar; -- (Colombia) Elkin Alcalá; 29 (United States) Trevor Clifton; 59 (United States) Stephen Gonsalves; 35 (United States) Josh Green; 87 (United States) Zac Grotz; 46 (Cuba) Bruce Hernández; -- (United States) Kurt Heyer; 49 (United States) Jake Jewell; 32 (United States) Aaron McGarity; 25 (United States) Greg Minier; 45 (Cuba) Ariel Miranda; 18 (United States) McKinley Moore; 66 (Mexico) Luis Morán; 20 (United States) Andrew Pérez; 37 (Mexico) Juan Robles; 54 (Mexico) Luis Iván Rodríguez; 79 (Mexico) Sasagi Sánchez; 72 (Mexico) Eduardo Vera; 58 (Mexico) Luis Villavicencio	Catchers: 85 (Mexico) Jesus Córdova; 8 (Mexico) Alfredo Hurtado; 2 (United States) Donny Sands; Infielders: 22 (United States) Joshua Fuentes; 3 (United States) Mateo Gil; 55 (Mexico) Irving Lopez; 98 (Mexico) David Mosqueda; 26 (United States) Michael Wielansky; Outfielders: 87 (Mexico) José Aguilar; 16 (Mexico) Carlos Báez; 40 (United States) Willie Calhoun; 48 (Puerto Rico) Johneshwy Fargas; 41 (United States) Kyle Garlick; 69 (United States) Alejandro Quezada; 18 (United States) Josh Stowers	Manager: 30 (Mexico) Benji Gil; Coaches: 1 (Mexico) Luis Borges; 37 (Mexico) Miguel Duarte (pitching); 3 (Mexico) Fernando Elizondo (third base); 33 (Mexico) Gerardo Garza (catchers); 47 (Mexico) Julio César Miranda (pitching); 40 (Mexico) Jesús Moreno (pitching); Roster updated on February 17, 2026

=== Dorados de Chihuahua ===
Dorados de Chihuahua roster
Players	Coaches/Other
Pitchers: 44 Samuel Alvarado; -- Raúl Barrón; -- Yamil Castillo; -- Eduardo Figueroa; 37 Ben Kowalski; 58 Wily Peralta; 22 Gabriel Ponce; 26 Pedro Rodríguez; 23 Caleb Smith; 00 Javier Solano; -- Leonardo Taveras; 2 Brady Tedesco; 50 Christian Torres; -- Darel Torres; -- Alan Valdez; 15 Jesús Valles; 25 Eli Villalobos; -- Braden Webb; -- Gabriel Ynoa †; 37 Alan Zhang Carter; Catchers: 40 Rusber Estrada; 73 Hansen López; -- Gilberto Vizcarra; Infielders: -- Bryson Brigman; 9 Oziel Flores; 23 Aaron Lugo; 24 Alejandro Mejía; 29 Carlos Muñoz; -- Agustin Murillo; 20 Leobaldo Piña; 19 Andrelton Simmons; -- Elías Verdugo; Outfielders: 1 Matt Bottcher; 4 Rafael Franco; 18 Jesús Loya ∞; 97 Seuly Matías; 48 Brayan Mendoza; 11 Carlos Pacheco; 69 Rainel Rosario	Manager: -- Homar Rojas; Coaches: -- Lino Connell (bench); -- Iker Franco (catchers); -- Tury Morales (quality); -- Richard Paz (third base); -- Marco Romero (hitting); -- Edgardo Saldaña (bullpen); -- Raúl Sánchez (first base); -- Lino Urdaneta (pitching); 7-day injured list; ~ Development list; # Rehab assignment; ∞ Reserve list; ‡ Restricted list; § Suspended list; † Temporarily inactive list; Roster updated February 19, 2026; Transactions; → More rosters: MiLB • Mexican League

=== Rieleros de Aguascalientes ===
Rieleros de Aguascalientes roster
Players	Coaches/Other
Pitchers: 77 Adrián Almeida; -- Víctor Arano; 88 Wendolyn Bautista; 15 Hendrick Briones; -- Isaac Briones; 12 Jimmy Burnette; -- Raúl Castellón; 13 Yaya Chentouf; 49 Oscar De La Cruz; 45 Elniery García; 6 Porfirio Guerrero; 22 Brian McKenna; 36 Ronald Medrano; 27 Deylen Miley; 73 Fernando Olguín; 20 Ramón Rosso; 25 Axel Sauceda; -- Alex Scherff; 84 Tucker Smith; 29 Nick Trogrlic-Iverson; 76 Raffi Vizcaíno; Catchers: 98 Isaac Arias; 15 Mario Feliciano; -- Saúl Garza; 32 José Lizárraga; -- Carlos Mendivil; -- Fernando Villalobos; Infielders: 24 Ángel Camacho; 18 Andretty Cordero; 2 Ángel Erro; 7 Marco Jaime; -- Kole Kaler; 57 Pedro Martínez; 70 Luis Medina; -- Frankie Tostado; -- Leonel Valera; 97 Emiliano Vega; Outfielders: 16 Abiel Amador; 20 Jared Carr; -- Amilcar Gómez; -- Simón Muzziotti; -- Sergio Pérez; 30 Ángel Reyes	Manager: -- Enrique Reyes; Coaches: -- José Amado (bench); 29 Pedro Diaz; 32 Jesus Moreno; 61 Roberto Perez; 43 Alberto Rivera; 47 Juan Robles; 79 Luis Rodriguez; 7-day injured list; ~ Development list; # Rehab assignment; ∞ Reserve list; ‡ Restricted list; § Suspended list; † Temporarily inactive list; Roster updated February 4, 2026; Transactions; → More rosters: MiLB • Mexican League

=== Saraperos de Saltillo ===
Saraperos de Saltillo roster
Players	Coaches/Other
Pitchers: 74 Anibal Cervantes; -- Dakota Chalmers; 85 Alex Claudio; -- Cameron Cotter; -- Jesús Cruz; -- Neftalí Feliz; -- Wilmer Font; -- Deolis Guerra; 6 Francisco Haro; -- Shō Ishikawa; 77 Ivan Izaguirre; 35 Sebastian Kessay; 59 Ian Krol; -- Yuki Kuniyoshi; 50 Mario Meza; -- Andrew Morales ∞; 27 Zach Mort; -- Eric Pardinho; 31 Eury Ramos; -- Erich Uelmen; -- Kazuki Yabuta; 84 Samuel Zazueta; Catchers: 25 Edgar Cabral; 74 Julián León; -- Patrick Mazeika; -- Julio E. Rodríguez; Infielders: 13 Emmanuel Avila; -- Matthew Batten; -- Chris Carter; 45 Aldo Flores; 37 Keven Lamas; 27 Marco Lopez; 73 Luis Carlos Martínez; 9 Alex Mejia; 66 Roberto Ramos; -- Ramón Ríos; 20 Missael Rivera; -- Drew Stankiewicz; 92 Brandon Villarreal; Outfielders: 84 Matt Acosta; 14 Jesus Arredondo; -- Anthony García; -- Juan Macias ∞; -- Jesús Marriaga ∞; 51 J. P. Martínez; 61 Cristian Morales; 8 Fernando Villegas	Manager: -- Mendy López; Coaches: -- Juan Canizales (hitting); 6 Fernando Elizondo (assistant); 4 Luis Carlos Martinez (third base); -- Orber Moreno (assistant); -- Vicente Palacios (pitching); -- José Manuel Rodríguez (assistant); -- Willie Romero (bench); 7-day injured list; ~ Development list; # Rehab assignment; ∞ Reserve list; ‡ Restricted list; § Suspended list; † Temporarily inactive list; Roster updated February 14, 2026; Transactions; → More rosters: MiLB • Mexican League

=== Sultanes de Monterrey ===
Sultanes de Monterrey roster
Players	Coaches/Other
Pitchers: 55 Ronaldo Alesandro; 92 Manny Bañuelos; 66 Alonso Becerra; 75 Chris Ellis; 72 Geronimo Franzua; 38 Paul Fry; 43 Juan Gámez ∞; 45 Nolan Kingham; 53 Zack Leban; 59 Carlos Medina; -- Yohander Méndez; 71 Zach Muckenhirn ∞; 41 Jesús Pirela; 99 Joseph Riley; 29 Erick Rodríguez; 48 Richard Rodríguez; 84 Arturo Roque; -- Norge Ruiz; 61 Justus Sheffield; 16 Stephen Tarpley; 49 César Vargas; 28 Alexis Vera; -- Jared Wilson; Catchers: 44 Christopher Escárrega; 27 Jonathan Morales ∞; 40 Omar Rentería ∞; 29 Erick Rodríguez; -- Pedro Severino ∞; Infielders: 58 Josh Lester; 6 Johan López; 25 Victor Mendoza; 4 Gustavo Núñez; 19 Ramiro Peña; 88 Esteban Quiroz; 2 Javier Salazar ∞; 62 Luis Santos; -- Christian Villanueva; Outfielders: 16 Alonso Becerra; -- Socrates Brito; 33 José Cardona; 36 Donovan Casey; 79 Héctor Jacquez; -- Louis Okoye; 11 Asael Sánchez; 15 Raimel Tapia	Manager: -- Henry Blanco; Coaches: 73 Erik Rodríguez (bench); 31 Juan Canizales (hitting); 32 Remigio Diaz (first base); 37 Daniel Hinojosa (third base); 77 Alberto Manrique (bullpen); 56 Óscar Villarreal (bullpen); 7-day injured list; ~ Development list; # Rehab assignment; ∞ Reserve list; ‡ Restricted list; § Suspended list; † Temporarily inactive list; Roster updated February 20, 2026; Transactions; → More rosters: MiLB • Mexican League

=== Tecolotes de los Dos Laredos ===
Tecolotes de los Dos Laredos roster
Players	Coaches/Other
Pitchers: 71 Nate Antone; 1 Skyler Árias; 74 Alejandro Barraza; 13 Sam Bordner; 90 Brandon Brennan; 4 Geoff Broussard; 66 Clark Cota; 25 Theo Denlinger; 5 Michael Gómez; 41 Junior Guerra; -- Jordan Guerrero ∞; 54 Tom Hackimer; 38 Donnie Hart; -- Ryan Hendrix; 5 Drew Hutchison; -- Tyler Ivey; 15 Daniel Mengden; 91 Adolfo Ramírez; 52 Nick Ramirez; -- Wilking Rodríguez; 50 Connor Sadzeck; 64 Drew Strotman; 98 Emilio Vargas; 31 Andrew Vasquez; 76 Anthony Vizcaya; Catchers: 37 Francisco Arcia; 55 Francisco Cordoba; Infielders: 7 Johan Camargo; 22 Alí Castillo; -- Jesse Castillo; 4 Aledmys Díaz; 40 Grant Kay; 23 José Martínez; 2 Matt McDermott; 32 Italo Motta; 86 Marcos Valenzuela; -- Kennys Vargas; Outfielders: 11 Ryan Aguilar; 2 Danny Amaral; 62 Antonio Castañeda; -- Jake Cave; 34 Daniel Cornejo; 20 Rudy Flores; 99 Cade Gotta; 65 Yadiel Hernández; 47 Jordan Luplow; 43 Harold Ramírez; 3 Danry Vásquez	Manager: 14 Félix Fermín; Coaches: -- José Ángel Chávez (third base); 39 Ricardo Cuevas (bench); 38 Donnie Hart (pitching); -- Erick Sandoval (first base); -- Félix Tejada (bullpen); 7-day injured list; ~ Development list; # Rehab assignment; ∞ Reserve list; ‡ Restricted list; § Suspended list; † Temporarily inactive list; Roster updated February 3, 2026; Transactions; → More rosters: MiLB • Mexican League

=== Toros de Tijuana ===
Toros de Tijuana roster
Players	Coaches/Other
Pitchers: 48 José Álvarez; -- Andrés Ávila ∞; 56 Silvino Bracho; 45 Ben Braymer; 37 Diego Castillo; 70 Matt Dermody; -- Miguel Díaz; 10 Alex DuBord; 17 Jake Fishman; 32 Ralph Garza Jr.; 55 Domingo Germán; 52 David Gutierrez; 61 José Hernández; 11 Sam McWilliams; 35 Jorge Perez; 53 Roel Ramírez; 62 David Reyes; -- Hansel Robles; 38 Kirby Snead; 23 Teddy Stankiewicz; 40 Daniel Zamora; -- Juan Zapata; Catchers: 12 Sergio Burruel; 44 Alí Solís; 20 Tomás Telis; Infielders: 40 José Chávez; 99 Edson García; 8 César Izturis Jr.; 25 Jack Mayfield; 14 Hernán Pérez; 46 Aderlin Rodríguez; 74 Isaac Rodríguez Salazar; Outfielders: 49 Ismael Alcántara; 38 Franchy Cordero; 27 Junior Lake; -- Rafael Ortega; -- Cal Stevenson	Manager: -- Roberto Kelly; Coaches: -- Reinaldo Batista (first base); 9 Carlos Hernández (catchers); -- César Izturis (bench); -- Ryan Long (hitting); -- Doug Mathis (pitching); 24 Vicente Romo (bullpen); -- Gerardo Sánchez (third base); 16 Alonso Téllez (assistant hitting); 7-day injured list; ~ Development list; # Rehab assignment; ∞ Reserve list; ‡ Restricted list; § Suspended list; † Temporarily inactive list; Roster updated February 14, 2026; Transactions; → More rosters: MiLB • Mexican League

== South Division ==
=== Bravos de León ===
Bravos de León roster
Players	Coaches/Other
Pitchers: 29 Samuel Adames; 71 Rodrigo Benoit; 9 Faustino Carrera; 81 Daniel Cruz; 30 Tyler Duffey; 15 Carlos Espinal; 72 Pedro García; 76 Jonas Garibay; 39 Miguel Gómez; 38 Felipe González; -- Robert Gsellman; 23 Adam Hofacket; 18 Jeff Lindgren; 46 Ángel López; 99 Juan Mateo; 15 Carlos Morales; 32 Yordan Nodal; -- Oliver Ortega; 18 Brandon Quintero; 36 Arturo Reyes; 19 Aaron Shortridge; 24 Josh D. Smith; 91 Jake Thompson; 71 Phillips Valdéz; 37 Jonathan Vargas; Catchers: 17 Marco Chicuate; 28 Iván Morales; 5 Jhon Núñez; 20 Yorman Rodriguez; Infielders: 11 Angelo Castellano; 60 Phillip Evans; 26 Luis Fernando Medina; 8 Jermaine Palacios; 53 Sandber Pimentel; Outfielders: 9 Israel Camacho; 6 Roberto Castro; 10 Alan Garcia; -- Gaige Howard; 13 Jimmy Kerrigan; -- Leonys Martín; 75 Alberth Martínez	Manager: -- Miguel Tejada; Coaches: -- Tavo Álvarez (pitching); 25 Ramon Cairoz; 33 Mercedes Esquer; 92 Heber Gomez; -- Anderson Hernández (third base / infield); 55 Victor Ledezma; 5 Carlos Ornelas; 14 Rafael Rijo; -- Russell Vásquez (bench); 7-day injured list; ~ Development list; # Rehab assignment; ∞ Reserve list; ‡ Restricted list; § Suspended list; † Temporarily inactive list; Roster updated February 20, 2026; Transactions; → More rosters: MiLB • Mexican League

=== Conspiradores de Querétaro ===
Conspiradores de Querétaro roster
Players	Coaches/Other
Pitchers: 31 Tyler Alexander; -- Casey Coleman ∞; 56 Ofreidy Gómez; 89 Reymin Guduan; 77 Adrián Gusman; 67 Arnaldo Hernández; 0 Jhan Mariñez; 83 Román Méndez; 28 Fabián Muñiz; 45 Fredy Quintero; 57 Dalton Rodríguez; 17 Denny Román; 27 Matt Swilley; 46 Tyler Viza; 35 Javier Zenizo; Catchers: 7 Alejandro Flores; 84 Arturo Rodríguez; -- Carlos Soto; Infielders: 23 Daniel Castro; 53 Edwin Espinal; 39 Kelvin Gutiérrez; 7 Alen Hanson; 2 Yairo Muñoz; 20 José Robledo; Outfielders: 15 Rusney Castillo; 47 Yurisbel Gracial; 52 Beder Gutiérrez; -- Dwight Smith Jr.; 51 Henry Urrutia	Manager: -- Dan Firova; Coaches: -- Emigdio López (coach); 83 Román Méndez (coach); -- Yoan Carlos Pedroso (coach); -- Juan Rodríguez (coach); 7-day injured list; ~ Development list; # Rehab assignment; ∞ Reserve list; ‡ Restricted list; § Suspended list; † Temporarily inactive list; Roster updated February 17, 2026; Transactions; → More rosters: MiLB • Mexican League

=== Diablos Rojos del México ===
Diablos Rojos del México roster
Players	Coaches/Other
Pitchers: 20 Tomohiro Anraku; 95 Saúl Arias; 28 Jose Bravo; 24 Efraín Contreras; -- Rafael Cordova; 13 Justin Courtney; 58 Edwin Fierro; 14 Kevin Gowdy; 19 Brooks Hall; 50 Felipe Hernández; 93 Juan Pablo López; 54 J. C. Mejía; 84 Jorge Monroy; -- Luis Patiño; 77 Ricardo Pinto; 24 Daniel Ponce de Leon; 51 Gerardo Reyes; -- Shea Spitzbarth; 38 José Miguel Vega; 53 Nick Vespi; 43 Jimmy Yacabonis; Catchers: 70 Gabriel Gutiérrez; -- Francisco Mejía; 45 Mikel Nieblas; 18 Carlos Pérez; Infielders: 29 Japhet Amador; -- Franklin Barreto; 22 Robinson Canó; 9 Allen Córdoba; -- Maikel Franco; 47 Juan Carlos Gamboa; 61 Moisés Gutiérrez; 46 José Marmolejos; 6 Rio Ruiz; 8 Carlos Sepúlveda; -- Jon Singleton; Outfielders: 23 Ramón Flores; 31 Julián Ornelas; 67 José Pirela	Manager: 30 Lorenzo Bundy; Coaches: 63 Jesús Arredondo (third base); 40 Víctor Bojórquez (assistant); 30 Roberto Espinoza (pitching); -- Héctor Hurtado (assistant); 59 Guillermo Navarro (catchers); 64 Nathanael Reyes (bullpen); 3 José Luis Sandoval (first base); 98 Carlos Sievers (hitting); 62 Sergio Valenzuela (assistant); 7-day injured list; ~ Development list; # Rehab assignment; ∞ Reserve list; ‡ Restricted list; § Suspended list; † Temporarily inactive list; Roster updated February 19, 2026; Transactions; → More rosters: MiLB • Mexican League

=== El Águila de Veracruz ===
El Águila de Veracruz roster
Players	Coaches/Other
Pitchers: 53 Fabián Anguamea; -- Luarbert Arias; 99 Jonathan Aro; 15 Connor Curlis; 26 Norman Elenes; -- Davis Feldman; 82 Uriel Ferman; -- Marco Fregozo; 56 Nick Gardewine; -- Jeff Ibarra; 12 Mario Jiménez; -- Ricky Karcher; -- Dinelson Lamet; 73 Orlando Lara; 79 Alberto Leyva; 96 Luis Márquez; 70 Vidal Nuño; -- Miguel Ojeda; 17 Andy Otero; -- Yorvin Pantoja; 82 Luis Pérez; 33 Dereck Rodríguez; 47 Miguel Romero; -- Omar Sainz; -- Ángel Sánchez; -- Andrew Schultz; 27 Braulio Torres-Pérez; 98 Alejandro Trujillo; Catchers: -- José Félix; 75 José Torres; 72 Juan Uriarte; Infielders: -- Ándres Álvarez; 87 Carlos Franco; 67 Edwin García; 45 Ronald Guzmán; -- Jack López; -- Rangel Ravelo; -- Roberto Valenzuela; 35 Breyvic Valera; Outfielders: -- Jorge Bonifacio; 66 Ricardo Céspedes; -- Sebastián Elizalde; 41 Daniel Montano	Manager: -- Enrique Sánchez (interim); -- Jesús Valdez (interim); Coaches: 3 Porfirio Mendoza (assistant); 63 Ricardo Osuna (bullpen); -- Carlos Rivera (coach); 7-day injured list; ~ Development list; # Rehab assignment; ∞ Reserve list; ‡ Restricted list; § Suspended list; † Temporarily inactive list; → More rosters: MiLB • Mexican League

=== Guerreros de Oaxaca ===
Guerreros de Oaxaca roster
Players	Coaches/Other
Pitchers: 32 Solomon Bates; 40 Kyle Barraclough; -- Raymond Burgos; 71 Joel César; 44 Edwar Colina; 89 Robert Dugger; 70 José Frutos; 40 Odalvi Javier; 58 Radhames Liz; 52 Eduardo Mares; 81 Zach Matson; 45 Luis Fernando Miranda; 56 Víctor Morales; 53 Oscar Rojas; 93 Oscar Valenzuela; 26 Jake Walters; 75 J.P. Woodward; Catchers: 69 Carlos Garzón; 28 Ricardo Valenzuela; 85 Heber Villalobos; Infielders: 2 Alexi Amarista; 38 Pedro Castellano; 3 Jorge Flores; 8 Sebastián García; 33 Yariel González; 5 Juniel Querecuto; -- Juan Santana; -- Yoel Yanqui; Outfielders: 72 Luis Barrera; 64 Emilio Bonifácio; 31 Yonathan Daza; 79 Leo Germán; 7 Alfredo López; 24 José Carlos Ureña	Manager: -- Roberto Vizcarra; Coaches: 2 Iván Cervantes (first base); -- Alex González (assistant); -- Luis Huerta (pitching); -- Roberto Pérez (bench); 00 Nilson Robledo (catchers); 17 Javier Valentín (hitting); 7-day injured list; ~ Development list; # Rehab assignment; ∞ Reserve list; ‡ Restricted list; § Suspended list; † Temporarily inactive list; Roster updated February 20, 2026; Transactions; → More rosters: MiLB • Mexican League

=== Leones de Yucatán ===
Leones de Yucatán roster
Players	Coaches/Other
Pitchers: 28 Darío Agrazal; -- Miguel Castro; 49 Tommy Doyle; 47 Edwin Escobar; 45 Michael Feliz; -- Alexis González; -- Anthony Gose; 22 Adrián Hernández; 48 Trevor Kelley; 24 Tanner Kiest; -- Aaron Leasher; 75 Jose Luna; -- Katsuki Matayoshi; 38 Jake Miednik; 25 Yoanner Negrín; -- Félix Peña; 91 Héctor Pérez; -- Hazahel Quijada; 83 Luis Ramírez; 72 Carlos Stiff Rodriguez; -- Ricardo Rodríguez; 58 Jake Sanchez; -- Diego Serna; 71 Ryan Sherriff; -- Duane Underwood Jr.; 51 César Valdez; Catchers: -- Xorge Carrillo ∞; 71 Francisco del Campo; -- Geraldi Díaz; -- José Godoy; 55 Jafet Ojeda; 78 Fabián Urbina; Infielders: 88 Francisco Coronado; 7 Edwin García; -- Erik González; -- Dalton Guthrie; 98 Luis Juárez; 72 Héctor Mora; 74 Antonio Piñero; Outfielders: 36 Wynton Bernard; 78 Yustin Canizalez; 85 Hans Chacón; 33 Yadir Drake; 22 Carlos Figueroa; -- Estevan Florial; -- José Gaitán; 10 Leury García; 9 Norberto Obeso; 14 Henry Ramos; 23 Miles Simington	Manager: -- Sergio Omar Gastélum; Coaches: -- Eliézer Alfonzo (assistant); -- Jesús Araiza (assistant); -- Rafael Chaves (pitching); -- Martín Cortez (assistant); 16 Salvador Garibay (bullpen); -- Wilfredo Romero (bench); 7-day injured list; ~ Development list; # Rehab assignment; ∞ Reserve list; ‡ Restricted list; § Suspended list; † Temporarily inactive list; Roster updated February 21, 2026; Transactions; → More rosters: MiLB • Mexican League

=== Olmecas de Tabasco ===
Olmecas de Tabasco roster
Players	Coaches/Other
Pitchers: -- Garrett Alexander; -- Diógenes Almengo; 46 Denny Bentley; 23 Nolan Blackwood; -- Luis Cessa; -- Jimmy Cordero; 50 Tyler Danish; -- Johan Domínguez; 83 Samuel Gómez; 62 Norwith Gudiño; -- Keone Kela; 77 Luis Ledo; 88 Oliver Mateo; 31 Juan Pablo Oramas; 53 Spencer Patton; 70 Kevin Ribón; 24 Alfredo Ruiz; 59 Fernando Salas; 55 Nick Struck; -- Alexandro Tovalin; -- Carlos Vázquez; 99 Fred Villarreal; 56 Yoanni Yera; Catchers: 40 Antonio Almeida; -- Manuel Barradas; 25 Roy Morales; Infielders: -- Carlos Arellano; 7 Jasson Atondo; 77 Michael Baca; -- Iván Castillo; 16 Jesús Espinoza; 10 Adeiny Hechavarria ∞; 13 Marco Hernández; 12 Domingo Leyba; 8 Yamaico Navarro; 24 Luis Sardiñas; 52 Yunior Severino; 67 Emiliano Valencia; Outfielders: 18 Leobaldo Cabrera; 2 Leo Heras; 3 Francisco Lugo; 19 Francisco Peguero; -- Jacob Rhinesmith; -- Randy Romero; 72 Roel Santos	Manager: -- Luis Rivera; Coaches: 14 Eduardo Arredondo (assistant); 1 Adulfo Camacho (third base); -- Alberto Carreón (first base); -- Daniel Rodríguez (pitching); 96 Rubén Rivera (hitting); 37 Mario Ivan Santana (bench); -- Héctor Velázquez (bullpen); 7-day injured list; ~ Development list; # Rehab assignment; ∞ Reserve list; ‡ Restricted list; § Suspended list; † Temporarily inactive list; Roster updated February 5, 2026; Transactions; → More rosters: MiLB • Mexican League

=== Pericos de Puebla ===
Pericos de Puebla roster
Players	Coaches/Other
Pitchers: 54 Cristian Alvarado; 32 Liarvis Breto; 74 Yoimer Camacho; 99 Faustino Carrera; 33 Alejandro Carrillo; -- Harold Cortijo; 63 Moisés Díaz; 53 Vladimir Gutiérrez; 94 Jesús Huerta; 57 Domingo Jiménez; 22 Tyler McKay; -- Hunter McMahon; 35 Emailin Montilla; 78 Jonathan Partida; -- Cleiverth Pérez; 28 José Miguel Piña; 68 Erick Preciado; 73 Édgar Rodríguez; 38 Jackson Rose; 51 Edgar Santana; 67 Édgar Torres; 60 Alfredo Villarreal; 70 Héctor Villarroel; 41 Daniel Zazueta; Catchers: 44 Gerardo Castañeda; -- Michael de la Cruz; 15 Juan Kirk; 61 Gabriel Lino; 45 Daniel Mercado; -- David Rodríguez; Infielders: 13 Cristhian Adames; 82 Brayan Gómez; 43 Miguel Guzmán; 12 Samar Leyva; 7 Ciro Norzagaray; 66 Brayan Quintero; 11 Eduardo Torrealba; 27 Estamy Urena; Outfielders: 8 Lorenzo Cedrola; 39 Rogelio Cobos; 6 Phillip Ervin; -- Moisés Gómez; -- Herlis Rodríguez; 10 Juan Tinoco	Manager: -- Darryl Brinkley; Coaches: -- Matías Carrillo (assistant); 37 Miguel Duarte (bullpen); -- Cornelio García (assistant); -- Gabriel Luckert (assistant); -- Luis Maza (first base); -- Kevin Nieves third base; 28 Humberto Rojas (assistant); 7-day injured list; ~ Development list; # Rehab assignment; ∞ Reserve list; ‡ Restricted list; § Suspended list; † Temporarily inactive list; Roster updated January 7, 2026; Transactions; → More rosters: MiLB • Mexican League

=== Piratas de Campeche ===
Piratas de Campeche roster
Players	Coaches/Other
Pitchers: 93 Domingo Acevedo; 26 Carlos Bustamante; -- Danny Duffy; -- Bernardo Flores; 70 Onelki García; 62 Ken Giles; 54 Édgar González; 91 Miller Hogan; 63 James Hoyt; 9 Dan Kubiuk; 51 Jovany López; 17 José Isidro Márquez; 90 Seth Mayberry; 99 Sean Nolin; -- Wirfin Obispo; 1 José Quezada; 77 Joe Record; 51 Zac Rosscup; 66 Pablo Tellez; 57 Tyler Thomas; 32 Jake Thompson; 71 Darrell Thompson; Catchers: 88 Brett Auerbach; -- Luke Berryhill; 72 Ángel Chavarín; 41 Francisco Peña; Infielders: 8 Edgar Bravo; 24 Josh Broughton; 96 Connor Hollis; 30 Christian Ibarra; 18 Diego Madero; 13 Kevin Medrano; -- Addison Russell; 84 Robbie Tenerowicz; -- Andrew Young; Outfielders: 36 Jesús Fabela; -- Matt Higgins; 89 Yordi Martínez; 12 Cal Mitchell; 35 Alejandro Ortiz; 45 Félix Pérez	Manager: -- Lloyd McClendon; Coaches: -- Glenn Dishman (pitching); -- Jorge Luis Laredo (third base); -- Juan José Pacho (bench); -- Rubén Rivera (first base); -- Mike Rojas (associate manager); -- Roque Sánchez (assistant hitting); -- Francisco Villegas (bullpen); -- Dallas Williams (hitting); 7-day injured list; ~ Development list; # Rehab assignment; ∞ Reserve list; ‡ Restricted list; § Suspended list; † Temporarily inactive list; Roster updated February 21, 2026; Transactions; → More rosters: MiLB • Mexican League

=== Tigres de Quintana Roo ===
Tigres de Quintana Roo roster
Players	Coaches/Other
Pitchers: -- Melvi Acosta; -- José Adames; 29 José Albertos; 11 Clayton Andrews; 75 Gael Bermúdez; 38 Rigoberto Borbolla; 66 Fernando Burgueño; -- Mauricio Cabrera; 60 José Castillo; 65 Juan Cossio; -- Jesse Galindo; 9 Ariel Gracia; 30 Kenny Hernández; -- Alejandro Méndez; -- Jalen Miller; 74 Steve Moyers; -- Henry Omana; 93 Pedro Peniche; 38 Julio Robaina; 71 Markos Sánchez; 49 Erick Valenzuela; 60 Jesús Vallés; 32 Michele Vassalotti; Catchers: -- Carlos Castro; 78 Geovany Flores; 77 Germán Revilla; 26 Alexis Wilson; Infielders: -- Diosbel Arias; 71 Christopher Gastélum; 17 J. J. Matijevic; -- Eric Meza; 3 Antonio Monroy; -- Rainer Núñez; -- Jorge Rivera; 85 Robert Rabassa; 31 Randy Trejo; Outfielders: 10 Cornelius Randolph; -- Raico Santos; -- Miles Simington	Manager: -- Karim García; Coaches: 13 Carlos Álvarez (first base); 58 Jesús Manuel López (bench); -- Ricardo Navarro Jr. (Quality); 7-day injured list; ~ Development list; # Rehab assignment; ∞ Reserve list; ‡ Restricted list; § Suspended list; † Temporarily inactive list; Roster updated February 20, 2026; Transactions; → More rosters: MiLB • Mexican League
