= Grant Lavigne =

American baseball player (born 1999)

Gastonia Ghost Peppers – No. 34
- First baseman
- Born: August 27, 1999 (age 27); Bedford, New Hampshire, U.S.
- Bats: Left Throws: Right
- Stats at Baseball Reference

Grant Douglas Lavigne (born August 27, 1999) is an American professional baseball first baseman for the Gastonia Ghost Peppers of the Atlantic League of Professional Baseball. He was drafted by the Colorado Rockies in the first round of the 2018 MLB draft.

== Amateur career ==
Lavigne attended Bedford High School in Bedford, New Hampshire. As a sophomore, he was named New Hampshire's Gatorade Baseball Player of the Year after batting .543 with six home runs and 21 RBIs through 14 games. He was named the state's Gatorade Player of the Year once again as a senior. He committed to play college baseball at Wake Forest University.

== Professional career ==
=== Colorado Rockies ===
The Colorado Rockies selected Lavigne with the 42nd overall selection in the 2018 Major League Baseball draft. He signed with the Rockies for a $2 million signing bonus and was assigned to the Grand Junction Rockies of the Rookie-level Pioneer League. Over 59 games for Grand Junction, he slashed .350/.477/.519 with six home runs, 38 RBI, and 12 stolen bases. Lavigne spent the 2019 season with the Asheville Tourists of the Single-A South Atlantic League, batting .236/.347/.327 with seven home runs and 64 RBI over 126 appearances.

Lavigne did not play in a game in 2020 due to the cancellation of the minor league season because of the COVID-19 pandemic. He split the 2021 season between the Fresno Grizzlies of the Low-A West and the Spokane Indians of the High-A West. Over 104 games between both teams, he slashed .264/.380/.412 with nine home runs, 58 RBI, and 18 doubles.

Lavigne returned to Spokane to begin the 2022 season. In 68 games, he slashed .315/.406/.469 with five home runs and 38 RBI. Midway through the season, Lavigne was promoted to the Double-A Hartford Yard Goats of the Eastern League. With the Yard Goats, Lavigne batted .245 with five home runs in 57 games. In the offseason, Lavigne played for the Salt River Rafters of the Arizona Fall League. He slashed .328/.409/.557 in 17 games with seven doubles, two triples and one home run. Lavigne returned to Hartford for the 2023 season where he batted .227 with 17 homers and 51 RBI over 125 games.

Lavigne opened the 2024 season with the Triple-A Albuquerque Isotopes. In 130 appearances for Albuquerque, he batted .243/.359/.426 with 18 home runs, 53 RBI, and nine stolen bases. Lavigne elected free agency following the season on November 4, 2024.

=== Charros de Jalisco ===
On May 3, 2025, Lavigne signed with the Charros de Jalisco of the Mexican League. In 18 appearances for Jalisco, Lavigne batted .196/.305/.373 with three home runs and seven RBI.

=== Olmecas de Tabasco ===
On May 28, 2025, Lavigne was traded to the Olmecas de Tabasco of the Mexican League in exchange for José Félix. In two games for Tabasco, he went 1-for-6 (.167). Lavigne was released by the Olmecas on June 5.

=== Gastonia Ghost Peppers ===
On April 3, 2026, Lavigne signed with the Gastonia Ghost Peppers of the Atlantic League of Professional Baseball.
