= Leroy, Alabama =

- Census-designated place
- Former Leroy Post Office

- Location of Leroy in Washington County, Alabama.

- Location of Leroy in Alabama
- Coordinates: 31°29′40″N 88°00′05″W
- Country: United States
- State: Alabama
- County: Washington

Area
  - Total: 11.98 sq mi (31.02 km^{2})
  - Land: 11.91 sq mi (30.85 km^{2})
  - Water: 0.066 sq mi (0.17 km^{2})
- Elevation: 138 ft (42 m)

Population (2020)
  - Total: 766
  - Density: 64.3/sq mi (24.83/km^{2})
- Time zone: UTC-6 (Central (CST))
  - Summer (DST): UTC-5 (CDT)
- ZIP code: 36548
- Area code: 251
- FIPS code: 01-42304
- GNIS feature ID: 2628596
- Other names: Dogwood Level; New Canaan; Possum Corner

Leroy is a census-designated place located in Washington County, Alabama, around 60 miles (97 km) north of Mobile. As of the 2020 census, Leroy had a population of 766.

== Demographics ==
Historical population
| Census | Pop. | Note | %± |
|---|---|---|---|
| 2010 | 911 | | — |
| 2020 | 766 | | −15.9% |
U.S. Decennial Census

Leroy was first listed as a census designated place in the 2010 U.S. census.

Leroy CDP, Alabama – Racial and ethnic composition Note: the US Census treats Hispanic/Latino as an ethnic category. This table excludes Latinos from the racial categories and assigns them to a separate category. Hispanics/Latinos may be of any race.
| Race / Ethnicity (NH = Non-Hispanic) | Pop 2010 | Pop 2020 | % 2010 | % 2020 |
|---|---|---|---|---|
| White alone (NH) | 715 | 578 | 78.49% | 75.46% |
| Black or African American alone (NH) | 183 | 160 | 20.09% | 20.89% |
| Native American or Alaska Native alone (NH) | 2 | 1 | 0.22% | 0.13% |
| Asian alone (NH) | 0 | 2 | 0.00% | 0.26% |
| Native Hawaiian or Pacific Islander alone (NH) | 0 | 0 | 0.00% | 0.00% |
| Other race alone (NH) | 3 | 0 | 0.33% | 0.00% |
| Mixed race or Multiracial (NH) | 6 | 22 | 0.66% | 2.87% |
| Hispanic or Latino (any race) | 2 | 3 | 0.22% | 0.39% |
| Total | 911 | 766 | 100.00% | 100.00% |

== Notable people ==
- Sammie Coates, NFL wide receiver for the Kansas City Chiefs
- Phillip Ervin, professional baseball outfielder for the Cincinnati Reds
- Emanuel King, former NFL player
- Simmie Knox, American painter
- Kelvin Moore, former first baseman for the Oakland Athletics
