= Chavez Fernander =

Bahamian baseball player (born 1997)

Olmecas de Tabasco – No. 51
- Pitcher
- Born: July 7, 1997 (age 29); Freeport, Bahamas
- Bats: Right Throws: Right
- Stats at Baseball Reference

Chavez Fernander (born July 7, 1997) is a Bahamian professional baseball pitcher for the Olmecas de Tabasco of the Mexican League. He was named to the Great Britain national baseball team for the 2023 and 2026 World Baseball Classic.

== Early life ==
Fernander was born in Freeport, Bahamas and lived there until he was 15. He then moved to the United States to go to Georgia Premier Academy, a baseball preparatory school in Statesboro, Georgia.

Fernander attended and pitched at Polk State College, a JUCO school in Winter Haven, Florida, for two years. Fernander won the Suncoast Conference championship in 2017. In 2018, Fernander pitched in 17 games with a 8–4 record and a 3.09 ERA. He made the Suncoast Conference all-conference team.

== Career ==
=== Detroit Tigers ===
Fernander drafted in the 35th round of the 2018 Major League Baseball draft by the Detroit Tigers. For the 2019 season, Fernander was assigned to the Low–A Connecticut Tigers. In 11 games for the Tigers, Fernander was 2–2 with a 2.31 ERA. Fernander did not pitch in 2020 due to the cancellation of the minor league season during the COVID-19 pandemic.

In 2021, Fernander began the season at High-A West Michigan Whitecaps before being promoted to the Double-A Erie SeaWolves. In 33 games across both levels in 2021, Fernander was 2–2 with a 3.68 ERA. During 2022, Fernander would again play in both West Michigan and Erie. However, Fernander saw worse results with a 3–4 record and a 4.53 ERA across both levels. Fernander was released by the Tigers on August 3, 2023.

=== Acereros de Monclova ===
On April 11, 2024, Fernander signed with the Acereros de Monclova of the Mexican League. He made 35 appearances for the team, compiling a 2–1 record and 2.08 ERA with 28 strikeouts across 30 1/3 innings pitched.

Fernander made another 35 appearances for Monclova in 2025, posting a 3–3 record and 3.21 ERA with 21 strikeouts and one save across 33 2/3 innings of work.

=== Olmecas de Tabasco ===
On May 1, 2026, Fernander was traded to the Olmecas de Tabasco of the Mexican League.
