= Yunior Severino =

Dominican baseball player (born 1999)

Doosan Bears – No. 36
- Second baseman / Third baseman
- Born: October 3, 1999 (age 26); Santo Domingo, Dominican Republic
- Bats: Switch Throws: Right

KBO debut
- July 16, 2026, for the Doosan Bears

KBO statistics (through August 12, 2026)
- Batting average: .235
- Home runs: 0
- Runs batted in: 3

Teams
- Doosan Bears (2026–present)

Yunior Severino (born October 3, 1999) is a Dominican professional baseball infielder for the Doosan Bears of the KBO League.

== Career ==
=== Atlanta Braves ===
Severino originally signed with the Atlanta Braves as an international free agent in July 2016. He played his first professional season in 2017 with the Dominican Summer League Braves and Gulf Coast League Braves. After the season, he was declared a free agent after the Braves were penalized for violations in the international free agent market.

=== Minnesota Twins ===
On December 8, 2017, Severino signed a minor league contract with the Minnesota Twins. In his first year with the Twins in 2018, Severino played with the rookie-level Elizabethton Twins. He played for the rookie-level Gulf Coast League Twins and Single-A Cedar Rapids Kernels in 2019. Severino did not play in a game in 2020 due to the cancellation of the minor league season because of the COVID-19 pandemic. Severino returned to action in 2021 to play for the Single-A Fort Myers Mighty Mussels and Cedar Rapids. He played 2022 with Cedar Rapids and Double-A Wichita Wind Surge.

On November 6, 2023, the Twins added Severino to their 40-man roster to prevent him from reaching minor league free agency. He was optioned to the Triple-A St. Paul Saints to begin the 2024 season. In 128 games for the Saints, Severino slashed .254/.342/.434 with 21 home runs and 79 RBI. On November 4, he was removed from the 40-man roster and sent outright to St. Paul. Severino elected free agency the next day.

On November 18, 2024, Severino re-signed with the Twins organization on a minor league contract. He began the 2025 season with Triple–A St. Paul, batting .196/.344/.324 with two home runs, 10 RBI, and one stolen base. Severino was released by Minnesota on July 8, 2025.

=== Olmecas de Tabasco ===
On July 12, 2025, Severino signed with the Olmecas de Tabasco of the Mexican League. He made 21 appearances down the stretch for Tabasco, slashing .435/.552/.783 with six home runs and 22 RBI.

Severino played in 54 games for the Olmecas in 2026, hitting .340/.402/.529 with five home runs and 44 RBI.

=== Doosan Bears ===
On July 2, 2026, Severino signed a $200,000 contract with the Doosan Bears of the KBO League.
