= Phillip Ervin =

American baseball player (born 1992)

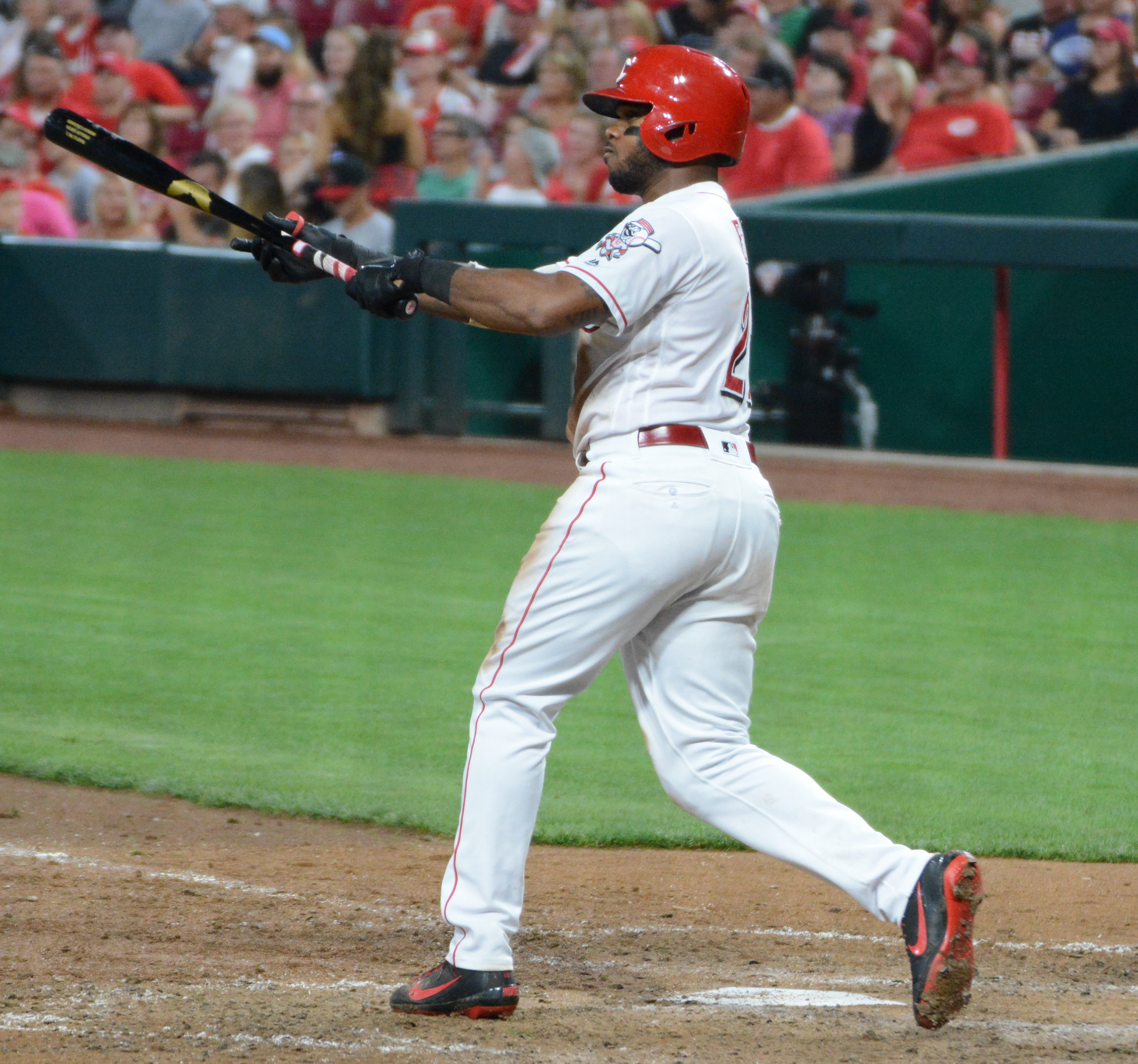
- Ervin batting for the Cincinnati Reds in 2018

Olmecas de Tabasco – No. 18
- Outfielder
- Born: July 15, 1992 (age 34); Mobile, Alabama, U.S.
- Bats: Right Throws: Right

MLB debut
- April 22, 2017, for the Cincinnati Reds

MLB statistics (through 2020 season)
- Batting average: .247
- Home runs: 17
- Runs batted in: 68
- Stats at Baseball Reference

Teams
- Cincinnati Reds (2017–2020); Seattle Mariners (2020)

Phillip Shane Ervin (born July 15, 1992) is an American professional baseball outfielder for the Olmecas de Tabasco of the Mexican League. Prior to playing professionally, Ervin attended Samford University, where he played college baseball for the Bulldogs. He has previously played in Major League Baseball (MLB) for the Cincinnati Reds and Seattle Mariners.

Ervin starred in baseball for Leroy High School. In college, Ervin was named a First Team All-Southern Conference in 2011, 2012 and 2013. The Reds selected him with the 27th overall selection in the 2013 MLB draft.

== Amateur career ==
Ervin attended Leroy High School in Leroy, Alabama, and played for the school's football, basketball and baseball teams. As a football player, Ervin played wide receiver alongside future NFL player Sammie Coates. During his junior season of football he hauled in 41 receptions for 697 yards and 6 touchdowns. In his senior football season at Leroy, Ervin tore the anterior cruciate ligament in his knee, requiring surgery. He missed the remainder of the football season, and missed all but the final six games of the baseball season. He played in the baseball postseason. He was able to pitch, but played as a designated hitter instead of an outfield, as he did not have the mobility to play the outfield. Samford University was the only National Collegiate Athletic Association Division I university to offer Ervin a scholarship. Samford allowed Ervin to play as an outfielder and pitcher in college baseball for the Samford Bulldogs baseball team.

As a freshman at Samford University in 2011, Ervin had a .371 batting average, a .440 on-base percentage (OBP), and a .516 SLG, with four home runs. He was named a freshman All-American by National Collegiate Baseball Writers Association and Louisville Slugger and the Southern Conference (SoCon) All-Freshman team and 1st Team All-SoCon. The Bulldogs also set a school single season record with 37 wins. Following his freshman season at Samford, Ervin played collegiate summer baseball for the Green Bay Bullfrogs of the Northwoods League, where he batted 39-for-128 (.305) with six home runs and 34 RBIs.

As a sophomore in 2012, Ervin batted .327 with a .519 SLG, 10 home runs, and 52 RBIs. He was again named first team All-SoCon. Ervin and the Bulldogs broke the school record for wins yet again with 41 and earned their first berth in the NCAA Division I baseball tournament in school history. That summer, Ervin played collegiate summer baseball for the Harwich Mariners of the Cape Cod Baseball League. He was named the league's most valuable player after batting .331 with 31 RBIs and 29 runs scored.

In the 2013 season as a junior, Ervin lead the Bulldogs in runs scored, stolen bases and on-base percentage. He was named the preseason SoCon Player of the Year and preseason first team All-American by Baseball America. Following the season, Ervin was named a Perfect Game Second Team All-American and a Third Team All-American by Baseball America.

== Professional career ==
=== Cincinnati Reds ===
==== Minor leagues ====
The Cincinnati Reds chose Ervin with the twenty-seventh pick of the 2013 Major League Baseball draft. This choice was surprising as the Reds were expected to select a pitcher. The Reds signed Ervin to a contract with a $1,812,400 signing bonus.

Ervin began his professional career with the Billings Mustangs of the Rookie-level Pioneer League, where he batted .326 with eight home runs. He was promoted to the Dayton Dragons of the Single–A Midwest League on July 30. He hit .349 with a home run for Dayton. He had a combined .311 batting average, nine home runs, 35 runs batted in, a .425 on-base percentage, and 14 stolen bases in 15 attempts. He injured his wrist during the 2013 season, and underwent surgery during the offseason to correct it. Ervin returned to Dayton in 2014, but struggled, batting .237 for the season, though he did steal 30 bases.

Ervin worked with Eric Davis on his hitting in 2015. He started the 2015 season with the Daytona Tortugas of the High–A Florida State League (FSL). Ervin's hitting improved, and he was selected for the FSL all-star game. He was promoted to the Pensacola Blue Wahoos of the Double–A Southern League later in the season. After the regular season, he played for the Peoria Javelinas of the Arizona Fall League. Ervin spent the 2016 season with Pensacola. He was named the league's player of the week for April 25 – April 30. In the league's all-star game, he hit a grand slam and won "Top Star" honors. Though he batted .239 for the season, his 36 stolen bases were fourth-best in the league. 362 on-base percentage was seventh-best in the league, and his 13 home runs were tied for eighth-best.

On November 18, 2016, the Reds added Ervin to their 40-man roster to protect him from the Rule 5 draft.

==== 2017 season ====
He began the 2017 season with the Louisville Bats of the Triple–A International League, and was promoted to the major leagues on April 21. Ervin made his major league debut on April 22 as a pinch hitter, in which he hit a tapper to pitcher Jake Arrieta who took the force out at second, allowing Ervin to reach on a fielder's choice. He was optioned back to Louisville on April 26. Ervin hit .256 with 7 home runs and 40 RBIs for the Bats. On August 15, he was recalled by the Reds. On August 16, 2017, Ervin recorded his first major league hit, a solo home run off of Héctor Rondón. The next day, he made his first career start at Wrigley Field, going 3-for-4 with a home run and 4 RBIs. In 28 games of his first season in the Majors, Ervin batted .259 with 3 home runs, 2 doubles, and 10 RBIs.

==== 2018 season ====
To begin 2018, Ervin won a roster spot as the Reds' fifth outfielder on Opening Day. On April 26, he was optioned back to Louisville. Ervin had a brief 3 day call up with the Reds in June before returning to Louisville again on June 24. On July 20, Ervin was called up to replace an injured Scott Schebler. On August 17, 2018, he recorded his first career walk off hit with a walk off home run off Ray Black of the San Francisco Giants. Ervin finished the regular season with a .252 average, 7 home runs, and 31 RBIs

==== 2019 season ====
Unlike 2018, Ervin did not make the club's Opening Day roster. He got his first of many call-ups of the year on April 23, 2019, to replace Matt Kemp who recently hit the DL. Despite not receiving much regular playing time with the big league club, Ervin enjoyed a career best year. He slashed career bests .271/.331/.466 and set career highs in GP (94), XBH (25), and R (30). On July 13, 2019, Ervin went a perfect 6-for-6 with three RBI to become the first Reds player since Walker Cooper in 1949 to have six hits in a game.

==== 2020 season ====
In his first 42 plate appearances of 2020, Ervin hit .086/.238/.086 with no home runs, which led to him being designated for assignment on August 28, 2020.

=== Seattle Mariners ===
On September 3, 2020, Ervin was claimed off waivers by the Seattle Mariners. In 18 games for Seattle, he batted .205/.340/.282 with no home runs and four RBI. On December 16, Ervin was designated for assignment following the signing of Keynan Middleton.

=== Atlanta Braves ===
On December 22, 2020, Ervin was claimed off waivers by the Chicago Cubs. On February 20, 2021, Ervin was designated for assignment by the Cubs after the signing of Jake Marisnick was made official.

On February 22, 2021, Ervin was claimed off waivers by the Atlanta Braves. On March 27, Ervin was designated for assignment for the 4th time in the past 8 months. He cleared waivers and was sent outright to the Triple–A Gwinnett Stripers on April 3.

=== Lexington Legends ===
On April 1, 2022, Ervin signed with the Lexington Legends of the Atlantic League of Professional Baseball. Ervin played in 109 games for Lexington, hitting .275/.397/.467 with 18 home runs, 59 RBI, and 33 stolen bases. He became a free agent following the season.

=== New Jersey Jackals ===
On April 13, 2023, Ervin signed with the New Jersey Jackals of the Frontier League. In 46 games for the Jackals, Ervin hit .318/.438/.517 with 8 home runs, 38 RBI, and 14 stolen bases.

=== Charleston Dirty Birds ===
On March 9, 2024, Ervin, Keon Barnum, and James Nelson were traded to the Charleston Dirty Birds in exchange for players to be named later. In 102 games, he hit .271/.373/.481 with 19 home runs, 68 RBI, and 27 stolen bases. Ervin became a free agent following the season.

=== Pericos de Puebla ===
On December 10, 2024, Ervin signed with the Pericos de Puebla of the Mexican League for the 2025 season. In 79 appearances for Puebla, he hit .306/.421/.604 with 20 home runs, 70 RBI, and six stolen bases. On April 14, 2026, Ervin was released by the Pericos.

=== Tigres de Quintana Roo ===
On April 26, 2026, Ervin signed with the Tigres de Quintana Roo of the Mexican League. In 75 appearances for Quintana Roo, he slashed .311/.392/.477 with nine home runs, 43 RBI, and nine stolen bases.

=== Olmecas de Tabasco ===
On August 4, 2026, Ervin and Calvin Estrada were traded to the Olmecas de Tabasco of the Mexican League.
