= César Valdez =

Dominican baseball player (born 1985)

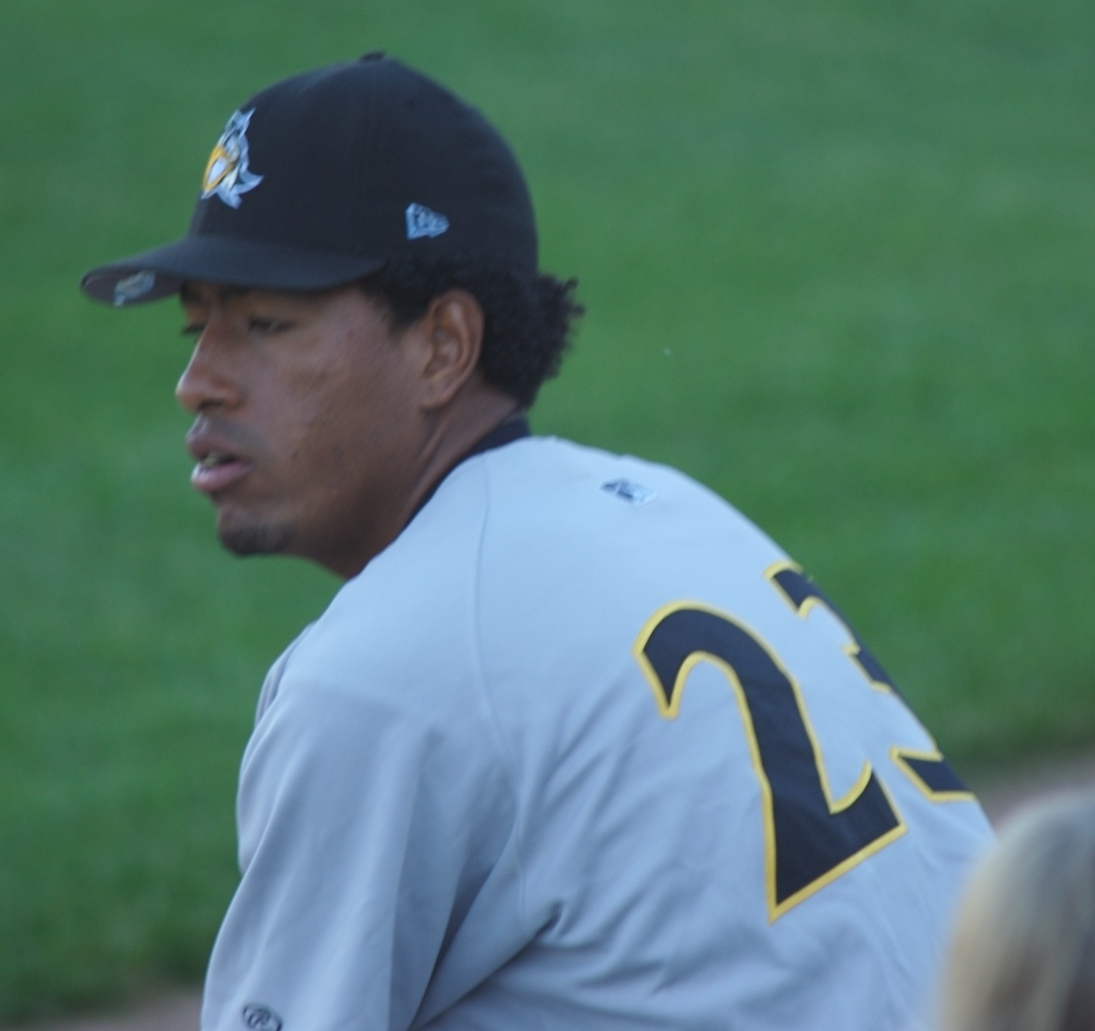
- Valdez with the South Bend Silver Hawks in 2007

Dorados de Chihuahua – No. 51
- Pitcher
- Born: March 17, 1985 (age 41); Santo Domingo, Dominican Republic
- Bats: Right Throws: Right

Professional debut
- MLB: May 3, 2010, for the Arizona Diamondbacks
- CPBL: August 30, 2015, for the Lamigo Monkeys

MLB statistics (through 2022 season)
- Win–loss record: 5–6
- Earned run average: 6.11
- Strikeouts: 91

CPBL statistics (through 2015 season)
- Win–loss record: 2–3
- Earned run average: 5.52
- Strikeouts: 39
- Stats at Baseball Reference

Teams
- Arizona Diamondbacks (2010); Lamigo Monkeys (2015); Oakland Athletics (2017); Toronto Blue Jays (2017); Baltimore Orioles (2020–2021); Los Angeles Angels (2022)

Career highlights and awards
- Taiwan Series champion (2015)

César Miguel Valdez (born March 17, 1985) is a Dominican professional baseball pitcher for the Dorados de Chihuahua of the Mexican League. He has previously played in Major League Baseball (MLB) for the Arizona Diamondbacks, Oakland Athletics, Toronto Blue Jays, Baltimore Orioles, and Los Angeles Angels, and in the Chinese Professional Baseball League (CPBL) for the Lamigo Monkeys.

== Career ==
=== Arizona Diamondbacks ===
Valdez signed with the Arizona Diamondbacks on May 2, 2005, as an international free agent. He made his professional debut with the Low-A Yakima Bears in 2006, posting a 7–5 record and 3.15 ERA in 16 games. In 2007, Valdez played for the Single-A South Bend Silver Hawks, recording a 7–10 record and 3.41 ERA in 25 appearances. The following year, Valdez split the season between the High-A Visalia Oaks and the Double-A Mobile BayBears, accumulating a 13–8 record and 3.14 ERA with 140 strikeouts in 160 1/3 innings of work. For the 2009 season, Valdez played for the Triple-A Reno Aces, registering a 7–6 record and 4.78 ERA in 19 appearances. He was assigned to Reno to begin the 2010 season.

Valdez was promoted to the major leagues for the first time on May 3, 2010, and made his MLB debut later that day, pitching five innings of one-run ball against the Houston Astros. Valdez was designated for assignment on September 13, after recording a 5.90 ERA in 20 games in Reno and a 1-2 record, 7.65 ERA, and 13 strikeouts in 20 innings pitched across nine big league games with the Diamondbacks. On September 13, Valdez was designated for assignment following the promotion of Konrad Schmidt. He cleared waivers and was sent outright to Reno on September 16.

=== Pittsburgh Pirates ===
On December 9, 2010, Valdez was traded to the Pittsburgh Pirates as the player to be named later (PTBNL) in a previous trade for Zach Duke. He began the 2011 season with the Triple-A Indianapolis Indians, logging a 3.86 ERA in 34 appearances.

=== Florida Marlins ===
On July 5, 2011, Valdez was traded to the Florida Marlins organization for a PTBNL or cash considerations. He played in 8 games for the Marlins' Triple-A affiliate, the New Orleans Zephyrs, and recorded a 7.59 ERA with 13 strikeouts.

=== Toronto Blue Jays ===
On July 28, 2011, Valdez was traded to the Toronto Blue Jays organization and assigned to the Triple-A Las Vegas 51s, but was released the following day without appearing in a game for the organization. During the offseason, Valdez played for the Águilas del Zulia of the Venezuelan Winter League and the Gigantes de Carolina of the Puerto Rican Winter League.

=== Vaqueros Laguna ===
On March 14, 2012, Valdez joined the Vaqueros Laguna of the Mexican League. He made 24 appearances and pitched to an 11–8 record, 5.27 ERA, and 84 strikeouts in 135 total innings. In the offseason, he returned to the Águilas del Zulia and later made five relief appearances for the Tigres del Licey of the Dominican Professional Baseball League (LIDOM). In 2013, Valdez returned to the Vaqueros Laguna, making 12 starts and logging a 4.93 ERA before being released on May 30.

=== Rieleros de Aguascalientes ===
On June 22, 2013, Valdez signed with the Rieleros de Aguascalientes of the Mexican League. Valdez was released on June 27 after making one start for the team, in which he allowed 4 runs in 4.2 innings of work. After another offseason playing in the Venezuelan and Dominican Winter Leagues, Valdez did not play regular season baseball in 2014. He made seven appearances for the Bravos de Margarita during the 2014 offseason.

=== Olmecas de Tabasco ===
On February 7, 2015, Valdez signed with the Olmecas de Tabasco of the Mexican League. In 23 starts, Valdez went 13–8 with a 2.63 ERA and 161 strikeouts in 160 2/3 innings pitched, and was named an LMB All-Star for the season. Valdez made five starts for the Tigres de Licey in the offseason.

=== Lamigo Monkeys ===
In August 2015, Valdez signed with the Lamigo Monkeys of the Chinese Professional Baseball League. Valdez made 8 appearances for Lamigo, posting a 2–3 record and 5.52 ERA with 39 strikeouts in 45.2 innings of work. Valdez won the 2015 Taiwan Series with the club, and became a free agent after the season.

=== Houston Astros ===
On January 1, 2016, Valdez signed a minor league contract with the Houston Astros organization and was invited to spring training. He spent the entire 2016 season with the Triple-A Fresno Grizzlies, and posted a 12–1 record, 3.12 ERA, and 114 strikeouts in 138 1/3 innings. Valdez elected free agency following the season on November 7.

=== Oakland Athletics ===
On November 17, 2016, Valdez signed a minor league contract with the Oakland Athletics organization. Valdez began the 2017 season with the Triple-A Nashville Sounds, and was recalled to the major leagues on April 21. After appearing in four games for Oakland with a 9.64 ERA, Valdez was designated for assignment on May 3.

=== Toronto Blue Jays (second stint) ===
On May 5, 2017, Valdez was claimed off waivers by the Toronto Blue Jays and optioned to the Triple-A Buffalo Bisons. He was recalled on May 20, and optioned back down on May 26. In July, Valdez was recalled by the Blue Jays and added to the starting rotation after Aaron Sanchez was placed on the disabled list. On July 25, Valdez earned his first MLB win in over seven years, defeating the Oakland Athletics 4–1. In 2017 he threw a changeup 49.4% of the time, tops in MLB. In 7 big league games with Toronto, he posted a 6.75 ERA. Valdez was outrighted off of the 40-man roster on November 1, 2017, and elected free agency the following day.

=== Olmecas de Tabasco (second stint) ===
On March 16, 2018, Valdez signed with the Olmecas de Tabasco of the Mexican League. He was released on May 1, after posting a 5.93 ERA in 7 appearances.

=== Leones de Yucatán ===
On July 29, 2018, Valdez signed with the Leones de Yucatán of the Mexican League. He finished the year with Yucatán, recording a 5–0 record and 2.48 ERA in 6 appearances. In 2019, he pitched to a 15–2 record with a 2.26 ERA and 122 strikeouts across 147.2 innings, winning the league's pitcher of the year award and being named an All-Star. On January 4, 2020, Valdez requested and was granted his release in order to pursue an opportunity with an MLB-affiliated organization.

=== Baltimore Orioles ===
On January 10, 2020, Valdez signed a minor-league deal with the Baltimore Orioles organization. Valdez did not play in a minor league game in 2020 following the cancellation of the minor league season because of the COVID-19 pandemic. Valdez was promoted to the active roster when the Orioles selected his contract on August 27. He pitched three scoreless innings in relief in his first MLB appearance in three seasons in a 5–0 loss to the Blue Jays at Sahlen Field two nights later on August 29. He earned his first MLB save with two shutout innings in a 6–3 win over the New York Yankees in the nightcap of a twi-night doubleheader at Camden Yards on September 4. In 2020 for the Orioles, Valdez pitched to an excellent 1.26 ERA with 12 strikeouts over 9 appearances. Valdez started out 2021 as the Orioles closer, recording 8 saves, however, he was moved out of that role after he began to struggle. In 38 appearances in 2021 for the Orioles, Valdez posted a 5.76 ERA with 44 strikeouts. On August 20, 2021, Valdez was designated for assignment by the Orioles, and subsequently outrighted to the Norfolk Tides on August 22. After posting a 1.42 ERA in 9 appearances with Triple-A Norfolk, Valdez was re-selected to the 40-man roster on September 21. He was designated for assignment by Baltimore the next day after another blown save. On October 5, Valdez elected free agency.

=== Los Angeles Angels ===
On March 15, 2022, Valdez signed a minor league deal with the Los Angeles Angels. He was assigned to the Triple-A Salt Lake Bees to begin the year.

On May 17, 2022, Valdez was selected to the active roster. He allowed two runs on two hits while failing to strike out a batter against the Texas Rangers and was designated for assignment the next day. He cleared waivers and was sent outright to Triple-A on May 22. In Triple-A in 2022, he was 10–5 with a 3.94 ERA in 23 starts, and led the minor leagues in complete games with three. He elected free agency on October 6. On December 3, Valdez re–signed with the Angels on a minor league contract that included an invite to spring training.

Valdez began the 2023 season with Triple-A Salt Lake, making 7 appearances (4 starts) and posting a 7.27 ERA with 25 strikeouts in 26.0 innings pitched. On May 8, 2023, he had his contract selected to the active roster. He was designated for assignment the following day without making an appearance for the team. On May 13, he cleared waivers and was sent outright to Triple-A. On October 10, Valdez elected free agency.

=== Leones de Yucatán (second stint) ===
On December 28, 2023, Valdez signed with the Leones de Yucatán of the Mexican League. In 18 starts for Yucatán, he compiled a 10–6 record and 4.06 ERA with 73 strikeouts across 106 1/3 innings pitched. His 10 wins were tied for the league lead alongside Trevor Bauer and Juan Pablo Oramas.

Valdez made 17 appearances (including 16 starts) for Yucatán during the 2025 campaign, posting a 7–5 record with a 5.86 ERA, 75 strikeouts, and 25 walks across 73 2/3 innings pitched.

Valdez logged seven starts for the Leones in 2026, but struggled to a 0–5 record with a 7.53 ERA, 26 strikeouts, and four walks over 28 2/3 innings. On May 24, 2026, Valdez was released by the club.

=== Dorados de Chihuahua ===
On June 5, 2026, Valdez signed with the Dorados de Chihuahua of the Mexican League.

== Pitching style ==
He primarily throws a changeup which he uses 81.3% of the time, tops out at 82 miles per hour and drops 8.5 inches more than the average for that type of pitch according to Statcast. He manipulates that changeup to function like at least five to six different pitches by alternating arm angles and grips. Orioles catcher Pedro Severino explained, "It’s not a normal changeup. I call it a slider-changeup because I don’t know where it’s going." Valdez also has a sinker at around 85-90 mph.
