= José Félix =

Mexican baseball player (born 1988)

Acereros de Monclova – No. 92
- Catcher
- Born: June 28, 1988 (age 38); Guasave, Sinaloa, Mexico
- Bats: Right Throws: Right
- Stats at Baseball Reference

José Heberto Félix (born June 28, 1988) is a Mexican professional baseball catcher for the Acereros de Monclova of the Mexican League. He was a mid-season All-Star in the California League in 2010 and the Texas League in 2011.

== Career ==
=== Tigres de Quintana Roo ===
Félix began his career in 2007 with the Tigres de Quintana Roo of the Mexican League. In 58 appearances for the team, he batted .247/.284/.302 with one home run, 21 RBI, and one stolen base.

=== Texas Rangers ===
Félix joined the Texas Rangers organization in the 2008 season. He made his affiliated debut with the Single-A Clinton LumberKings, playing in 88 games and hitting .262 with one home run, 24 RBI, and two stolen bases.

Félix spent the 2009 season with the High-A Bakersfield Blaze, posting a .241/.282/.294 batting line with 34 RBI across 90 games. He played in 100 games split between Bakersfield and the Double-A Frisco RoughRiders in 2010, slashing a cumulative .278/.311/.354 with three home runs, 37 RBI, and two stolen bases.

Félix spent the entirety of the 2011 season with Double-A Frisco, hitting .228/.263/.297 with two home runs, 28 RBI, and one stolen base across 72 games. Félix made 82 appearances for Double-A Frisco in 2012, his third consecutive season with the affiliate, slashing .260/.271/.377 with seven home runs, 41 RBI, and three stolen bases.

Félix made 32 appearances for the Triple-A Round Rock Express during the 2013 campaign, batting .270/.291/.306 with 13 RBI. He was invited to spring training in 2014, but did not make the club and was assigned to Round Rock. After one game for the Express, Félix was released by the Rangers organization on April 10, 2014.

=== Sultanes de Monterrey ===
On April 22, 2014, the Sultanes de Monterrey signed Félix. In 49 games for the team, he hit .258/.310/.356 with one home run and 12 RBI.

Félix made 50 appearances for the Sultanes in 2015, slashing .212/.239/.292 with two home runs and 12 RBI.

=== Tigres de Quintana Roo (second stint) ===
On June 26, 2015, the Sultanes traded Félix and Brandon Villarreal to the Tigres de Quintana Roo, marking his second stint with the Tigres. In 32 games down the stretch, he batted .398/.424/.527 with two home runs, 14 RBI, and one stolen base.

Félix made 87 appearances for Quintana Roo during the 2016 season, hitting .252/.278/.312 with three home runs, 16 RBI, and two stolen bases. In 2017, he played in 20 games for the team, going 8-for-42 (.190) with one RBI.

=== Acereros de Monclova ===
On May 8, 2017, Félix was traded to the Acereros de Monclova in exchange for Francisco Cordoba. In 70 appearances for Monclova, he slashed .279/.304/.363 with four home runs, 46 RBI, and one stolen base.

Félix played in 80 games for the Acereros during the 2018 campaign, hitting .357/.363/.443 with two home runs and 41 RBI.

=== Pericos de Puebla ===
On April 3, 2019, Félix signed with the Pericos de Puebla of the Mexican League. In 64 appearances for Puebla during the season, Félix slashed .281/.323/.382 with four home runs, 21 RBI, and one stolen base.

=== Rieleros de Aguascalientes ===
On October 4, 2019, Félix was returned to the Acereros, but on December 10, he was traded to the Rieleros de Aguascalientes. Félix did not play in a game in 2020 due to the cancellation of the Mexican League season because of the COVID-19 pandemic.

Félix made 36 appearances for Aguascalientes in 2021, batting .296/.333/.417 with two home runs and 16 RBI.

=== Olmecas de Tabasco ===
On April 23, 2022, Félix was traded to the Olmecas de Tabasco in exchange for C Gilberto Galaviz. He played in 67 games over the course of the year, slashing .269/.312/.326 with 23 RBI.

Félix made 64 appearances for Tabasco in 2023, batting .213/.244/.284 with two home runs, 16 RBI, and two stolen bases. He played in 31 games for the Olmecas during the 2024 season, hitting .284/.293/.395 with two home runs, four RBI, and one stolen base.

Félix played in nine games for Tabasco in 2025, going 3-for-24 (.125) with three RBI and one walk.

=== Charros de Jalisco ===
On May 28, 2025, Félix was traded to the Charros de Jalisco of the Mexican League in exchange for Grant Lavigne. In seven appearances for Jalisco, Félix went 3-for-15 (.200) with one RBI and one walk.

=== Algodoneros de Unión Laguna ===
On July 6, 2025, Félix was traded to the Algodoneros de Unión Laguna of the Mexican League. In 10 appearances for Unión Laguna, Félix slashed .355/.355/.484 with one home run and six RBI.

=== El Águila de Veracruz ===
On October 7, 2025, Félix was traded back to the Olmecas de Tabasco of the Mexican League. On January 30, 2026, Félix was loaned to El Águila de Veracruz for the 2026 season. In 43 appearances for Veracruz, he batted .185/.193/.259 with two home runs and 13 RBI.

=== Acereros de Monclova (second stint) ===
On July 5, 2026, Félix was traded to the Acereros de Monclova of the Mexican League.
