= Emanuel King =

American football player (born 1963)

No. 90, 92, 66, 99
- Position: Linebacker

Personal information
- Born: August 15, 1963 (age 63); Leroy, Alabama, U.S.
- Listed height: 6 ft 4 in (1.93 m)
- Listed weight: 245 lb (111 kg)

Career information
- High school: Leroy (AL)
- College: Alabama
- NFL draft: 1985: 1st round, 25th overall pick

Career history
- Cincinnati Bengals (1985–1988); Los Angeles Raiders (1989); Montreal Machine (1992); Sacramento Gold Miners (1993)

Awards and highlights
- Third-team All-American (1983); Second-team All-SEC (1983)

Career NFL statistics
- Sacks: 15
- Fumble recoveries: 2
- Stats at Pro Football Reference

Emanuel King (born August 15, 1963) is an American former professional football player who was a linebacker in the National Football League (NFL) for four seasons for the Cincinnati Bengals and two seasons for the Los Angeles Raiders. He was selected by the Bengals in the first round of the 1985 NFL draft with the 25th overall pick.

King played college football at Alabama, where he was a third-team All-American as a junior.

In September 2006, King began coaching as an assistant coach at his former high school, Leroy High School. He handles all special teams, lineman, and conditioning duties. In the 2006 season, King helped lead the 2A Leroy Bears to a 13-2 record, region and area championships, and their second state championship in 3 years. In 2007, he led the Bears to a 14-1 record, region and area championships, and their 3rd state championship in 4 years. In 2008, King led the Bears to a perfect 15-0 record, region and area championships, and their 4th state title in only 5 years.

He also helped coach Johnny Williams, current wide receiver at Duke University. 6 of the 16 2006 seniors and 9 of the 14 2007 seniors play either football or baseball at various colleges, nearly double the amount of any other year prior to King's arrival at Leroy. King, now in his 3rd year at Leroy, coaches more than 20 seniors, 14 of which plan to play football at a major university. In 2011 started coaching at Ums-Wright in Mobile, Al where he coaches the defensive line and special teams. He led the Bulldogs to the semifinals. Starting his second year and Ums in 2012, he hopes to lead the Bulldogs to a state championship. Coach king led the bulldogs to a 4A state championship in his second season at Ums. The defense pounded Oneonta and only allowed 14 points. Coach King will return for his 3rd year at Ums. All content from Random Facts down were posted by one of the 14 2007 seniors.
