= Austin Warner =

American baseball player (born 1994)

Olmecas de Tabasco – No. 78
- Pitcher
- Born: June 27, 1994 (age 32); Louisville, Kentucky, U.S.
- Bats: Left Throws: Left
- Stats at Baseball Reference

Austin Scott Warner (born June 27, 1994) is an American professional baseball pitcher for the Olmecas de Tabasco of the Mexican League.

== Career ==
Warner was born and grew up in Louisville, Kentucky, where he attended Trinity High School. He played college baseball at then-NCAA Division II Bellarmine University. Over the course of his collegiate career, Warner went 15–12 with a 3.37 ERA and 211 strikeouts in 227 1/3 innings pitched.

=== River City Rascals ===
Warner was undrafted in the 2016 Major League Baseball draft and signed with the River City Rascals of the independent Frontier League. He pitched for the Rascals into the 2017 season before his contract was purchased by the St. Louis Cardinals on June 15, 2017. Warner went 6–1 with a 4.01 ERA over 16 appearances, 12 of which were starts, during his time with River City.

=== St. Louis Cardinals ===
After signing, Warner was assigned to the Gulf Coast League Cardinals and was briefly elevated to the High–A Palm Beach Cardinals due to a shortage of relief pitchers, pitching three scoreless innings and earning a win in relief in his only appearance. He was later promoted to the Single–A Peoria Chiefs of the Midwest League. Warner began the 2018 season in the Florida State League with Palm Beach before earning a promotion to the Double-A Springfield Cardinals after 12 starts with a 3–3 record and a 3.41 ERA. Warner was promoted a second time to the Memphis Redbirds of the Triple-A Pacific Coast League. He returned to Springfield in 2019 and was named a Texas League All-Star before being promoted to Memphis for the rest of the 2019 season. Warner did not play in a game in 2020 due to the cancellation of the minor league season because of the COVID-19 pandemic, but was later assigned to the Cardinals' Alternate Training Site. For the 2021 season, he returned to Memphis. Over 41 appearances for the season, he went 7–3 with a 3.34 ERA and 75 strikeouts over 72 2/3 innings. On March 31, 2022, Warner was released by the Cardinals organization.

=== Seattle Mariners ===
On April 4, 2022, Warner signed a minor league contract with the Seattle Mariners organization. Warner made 33 appearances (12 starts) for the Triple-A Tacoma Rainiers, logging a 5–3 record and 5.21 ERA with 72 strikeouts in 86 1/3 innings pitched. He became a free agent following the season on November 10.

=== Chicago White Sox ===
On February 28, 2023, Warner signed a minor league contract with the Chicago White Sox organization. He made only three appearances for the Double–A Birmingham Barons, recording a 3.68 ERA with 8 strikeouts across 7 1/3 innings pitched. Warner elected free agency following the season on November 6.

=== Acereros de Monclova ===
On October 7, 2024, Warner signed with the Acereros de Monclova of the Mexican League. During the 2025 season, Warner started 18 games for Monclova, compiling a 5–6 record and 5.81 ERA with 62 strikeouts over 79 innings of work. On March 22, 2026, Warner was released by the Acereros.

=== Olmecas de Tabasco ===
On May 6, 2026, Warner signed with the Olmecas de Tabasco of the Mexican League.
