= Nolan Blackwood =

American baseball player (born 1995)

Olmecas de Tabasco – No. 23
- Pitcher
- Born: March 16, 1995 (age 31); Memphis, Tennessee, U.S.
- Bats: Right Throws: Right
- Stats at Baseball Reference

Nolan Blackwood (born March 16, 1995) is an American professional baseball pitcher for the Olmecas de Tabasco of the Mexican League.

== Amateur career ==
Blackwood attended Southaven High School in Southaven, Mississippi, where he developed his side-arm delivery, saying, "In high school one day, I was having arm issues. My elbow kept bothering me, and my high school coach said, 'Hey, drop it down and just see how it feels and see how you do.' My first bullpen [session] I threw like that, I think I threw like 90 percent strikes." He would help lead the school to a state championship in 2013 as a senior, allowing just a single run in 49.2 innings. Blackwood went on to attend the University of Memphis where he set a program record for appearances as a freshman (31) following that up with a program record in saves as a sophomore (14). In 2015, he played collegiate summer baseball with the Hyannis Harbor Hawks of the Cape Cod Baseball League. Blackwood spent three years at Memphis finishing his career with 24 saves, a 7–9 record, a 2.32 ERA, and 77 strikeouts in 116.1 innings.

== Professional career ==
=== Oakland Athletics ===
Blackwood was drafted by the Oakland Athletics as a 16th round pick in the 2016 MLB draft. Blackwood spent the majority of his season in A-ball with five appearances for the Vermont Lake Monsters and 13 appearances for the Beloit Snappers finishing with 25 strikeouts in 26 1/3 innings and a 2–2 record with a 3.26 ERA in his first pro season. He spent the full 2017 season with the High-A Stockton Ports where he held batters to a .205 average, made 19 saves in 20 opportunities, and struck 48 batters out compared to 18 walks. He finished the year with a 1–5 record and 3.00 ERA. He started the 2018 campaign with the Double-A Midland RockHounds in the Oakland organization.

=== Detroit Tigers ===
On August 18, 2018, the Athletics would trade Blackwood to the Detroit Tigers along with a player to be named later (eventually Logan Shore) in exchange for Mike Fiers. Blackwood played six games in the Tigers organization with the Double-A Erie SeaWolves and finished 2018 with a 6–4 record and 4.13 ERA over 45 Double-A appearances in the Oakland and Detroit organizations. Starting the 2019 season with the Triple-A Toledo Mud Hens, Blackwood made just three appearances giving up seven earned runs in three innings. He returned to Erie where he had a career-low ERA (1.76) and career-high in strikeouts (61), more than in any other full season. He held batters to just a .211 average and struck out 61 in 66 1/3 innings. He would also finish with a 6–4 record while earning four saves.

Blackwood did not play in a game in 2020 due to the cancellation of the minor league season because of the COVID-19 pandemic. He returned to Toledo in 2021, registering a 5-0 record and 4.92 ERA with 51 strikeouts in 60 1/3 innings pitched across 37 appearances. He spent the 2022 season with Toledo as well, pitching in 44 games and logging a 2-1 record and 3.81 ERA with 38 strikeouts in 49 2/3 innings of work. Blackwood elected free agency following the season on November 10, 2022.

=== Seattle Mariners ===
On February 3, 2023, Blackwood signed a minor league contract with the Minnesota Twins organization. Blackwood was released by the Twins on March 24.

On March 30, 2023, Blackwood signed a minor league contract with the Seattle Mariners organization. In 36 appearances for the Triple–A Tacoma Rainiers, he logged a 3–4 record and 4.75 ERA with 35 strikeouts in 47 1/3 innings pitched. On August 20, Blackwood was released by Seattle.

=== Milwaukee Brewers ===
On December 12, 2023, Blackwood signed with the Olmecas de Tabasco of the Mexican League. However, on February 23, 2024, Blackwood signed a minor league contract with the Milwaukee Brewers. In 22 appearances for the Triple-A Nashville Sounds, he posted a 2-1 record and 2.22 ERA with 19 strikeouts and two saves across 24 1/3 innings pitched. Blackwood was released by the Brewers organization on August 4.

=== Olmecas de Tabasco ===
On April 15, 2025, Blackwood signed with the Olmecas de Tabasco of the Mexican League. In 49 games 37.2 innings of relief he went 6-0 with a 2.63 ERA with 20 strikeouts and 1 save.
