= Sammie Coates =

American football player (born 1993)

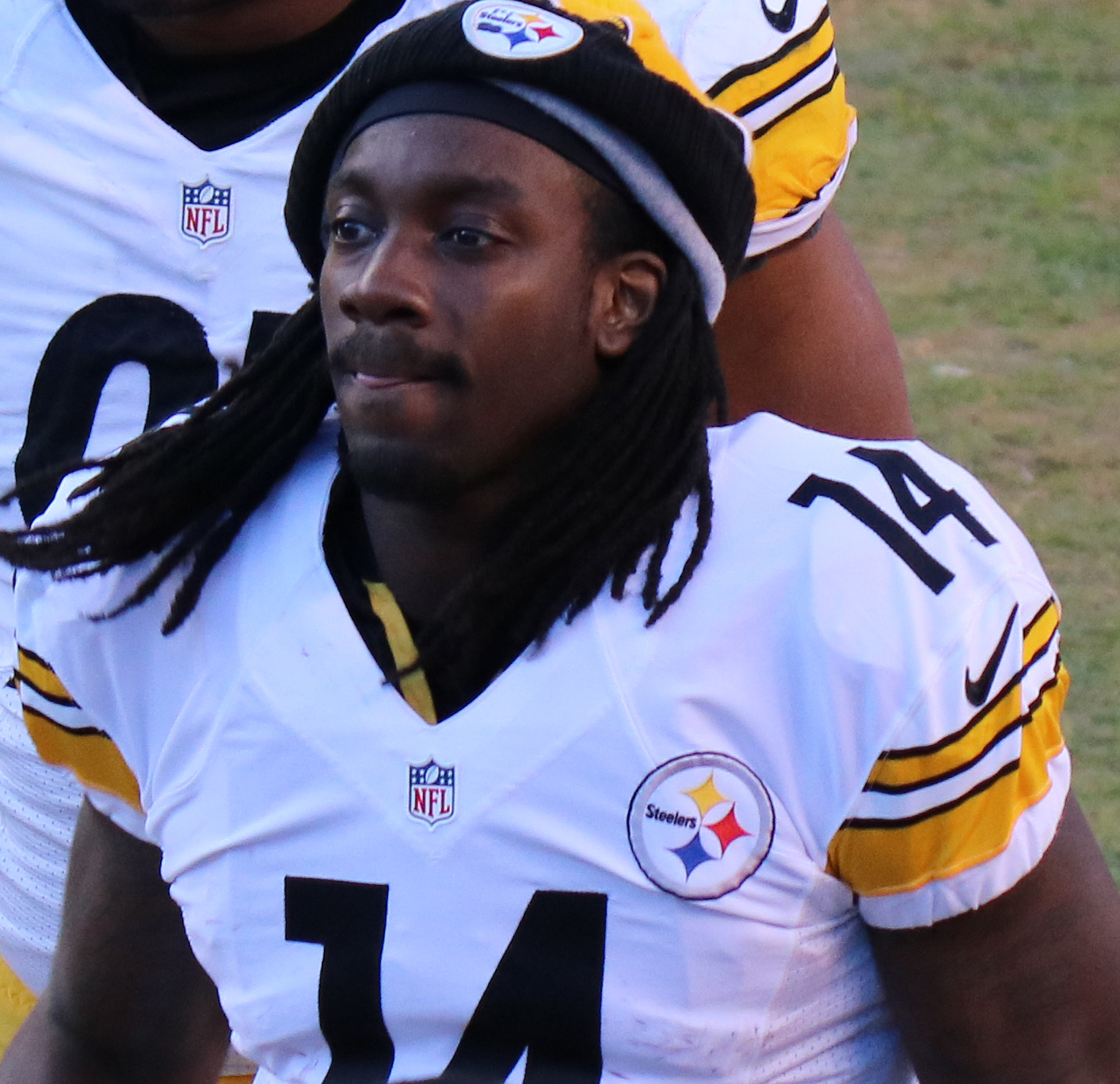
- Coates with the Pittsburgh Steelers in 2016

Columbia High School
- Title: Head coach

Personal information
- Born: March 31, 1993 (age 33); Leroy, Alabama, U.S.
- Listed height: 6 ft 1 in (1.85 m)
- Listed weight: 210 lb (95 kg)

Career information
- Position: Wide receiver (No. 14, 10, 18)
- High school: Leroy
- College: Auburn (2011–2014)
- NFL draft: 2015: 3rd round, 87th overall pick

Career history

Playing
- Pittsburgh Steelers (2015–2016); Cleveland Browns (2017); Houston Texans (2018); Kansas City Chiefs (2019)*; Houston Roughnecks (2020); Saskatchewan Roughriders (2021–2022); Edmonton Elks (2023)*
- * Offseason or practice squad member only

Coaching
- Jensen Beach HS (FL) (2020–2022) Assistant coach; Ohio Northern (2023) Wide receivers coach; Virginia–Wise (2024) Wide receivers coach & community service coordinator; Columbia HS (AL) (2025–present) Head coach

Awards and highlights
- Second-team All-SEC (2014)

Career NFL statistics
- Receptions: 29
- Receiving yards: 528
- Receiving touchdowns: 2
- Stats at Pro Football Reference

Sammie Coates Jr. (born March 31, 1993) is an American former professional football player who was a wide receiver in the National Football League (NFL). He currently serves as the head coach at Columbia High School in Huntsville, Alabama, a position he has held since 2025. He played college football for the Auburn Tigers, where he played in the 2013 SEC Championship Game and 2014 BCS National Championship Game. Coates was selected by the Pittsburgh Steelers in the third round of the 2015 NFL draft. He was also a member of the Cleveland Browns, Houston Texans, Kansas City Chiefs, Houston Roughnecks, Saskatchewan Roughriders, and Edmonton Elks.

== Early life ==
Coates attended Leroy High School in Leroy, Alabama, where he played high school football. As a senior, he had 57 receptions for 1,170 yards and 14 touchdowns. Coates originally committed to play college football at the University of Southern Mississippi in March 2010, but changed his commitment to Auburn University in July.

Considered a three-star recruit by Rivals.com, Coates was listed as the No. 71 wide receiver in the nation in 2011.

== College career ==
In 2011, Coates missed his entire freshman season at Auburn in 2011 due to a foot injury.

After missing his entire first season at Auburn, Coates was part of the wide receiver rotation in 2012. He played his first game against Clemson and caught his first career touchdown, a 33-yard Hail Mary from quarterback Kiehl Frazier, against Louisiana-Monroe. As a redshirt freshman, he had six receptions for 114 yards and two touchdowns.

As a sophomore in 2013, Coates started 12 games and had 42 receptions for 902 yards with seven touchdowns. He was a big play threat, having 14 catches for 30+ yards. Against Southeastern Conference (SEC) West rival Arkansas, he had 102 receiving yards, marking his third consecutive 100+ yard game. In the 2014 BCS National Championship Game loss against Florida State, he had four receptions for 61 yards.

As a junior in 2014, Coates had 34 receptions for 741 yards and four touchdowns. He finished his career at Auburn ranking 10th in the school's career receiving yards (1,757 yards), 13 career touchdown receptions, and seven career games with over 100 yards receiving. In the Iron Bowl against Alabama he set a school record with 206 receiving yards, five catches, and two touchdowns. In addition, he recorded four receptions in the Outback Bowl and was invited to the Reese's Senior Bowl and the NFL Combine. Coates was voted second-team All-SEC by the coaches, The Associated Press, and Phil Steele.

In December 2014, Coates decided to forego his senior season and declared for the 2015 NFL draft and also graduated from Auburn University with a diploma in public administration.

== Professional career ==
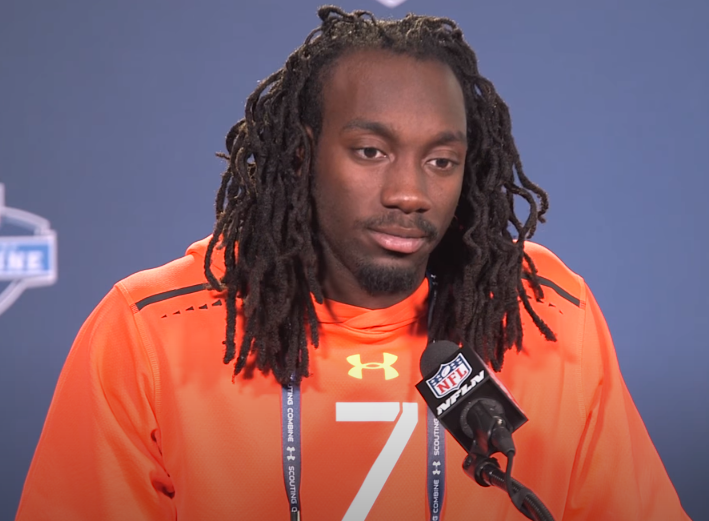
Coates at the NFL Scouting Combine in 2015

=== Pre-draft ===
On December 12, 2014, Coates announced he accepted his invitation to the 2014 Senior Bowl. Prior to the Senior Bowl, NFL analyst Mel Kiper projected him to possibly be a first round pick. The majority of NFL draft experts and scouts projected Coates to be a late first or second round pick. NFL scouts at the Senior Bowl said they loved Coates' sudden cuts, superior speed and big, well-developed frame, and his potential makes him a possible future No. 1 wide receiver. Coates met with team representatives from the Baltimore Ravens after he had an impressive week of practice where he made multiple highlight reel catches. On January 25, 2014, Coates recorded one reception for 13-yards in the Senior Bowl, but had to leave the game after suffering a groin injury. Under Jacksonville Jaguars head coach Gus Bradley, Coates helped the South defeat the North 20–10. He received an invitation to the NFL Combine and completed all of the required combine and positional drills. His 23 reps in the bench press finished first among wide receivers. On March 3, 2014, Coates opted to participate at Auburn's pro day along with Greg Robinson, Dee Ford, Chris Davis, Tre Mason, Cody Parkey, Jay Prosch, Quan Bray, and nine other teammates. He chose to only run positional drills for the scouts and team representatives in attendance. At the conclusion of the pre-draft process, Coates was projected to be a second or third round pick by the majority of NFL draft experts and scouts. He was ranked the 11th best wide receiver in the draft by NFLDraftScout.com and NFL media analysis Charles Davis.

Pre-draft measurables
Height	Weight	Arm length	Hand span	40-yard dash	10-yard split	20-yard split	20-yard shuttle	Three-cone drill	Vertical jump	Broad jump	Bench press	Wonderlic
6 ft 1 3/8 in (1.86 m)	212 lb (96 kg)	33 3/8 in (0.85 m)	9 3/8 in (0.24 m)	4.43 s	1.55 s	2.59 s	4.06 s	6.98 s	41 in (1.04 m)	10 ft 11 in (3.33 m)	23 reps	14
All values from NFL Combine

=== Pittsburgh Steelers ===
==== 2015 ====
The Pittsburgh Steelers selected Coates in the third round with the 87th overall pick in the 2015 NFL draft. He was the 13th wide receiver selected in 2015. On May 15, 2015, the Steelers signed Coates to a four-year, $2.91 million contract with a signing bonus of $631,515.

He competed with Markus Wheaton and Darrius Heyward-Bey throughout training camp to be the second starting wide receiver for the season, as Martavis Bryant was serving a four-game suspension to begin the season. Head coach Mike Tomlin named Coates the fourth wide receiver on the depth chart to start the season, behind Antonio Brown, Wheaton, and Heyward-Bey.

On September 27, 2015, Coates made his professional regular season debut in a 12–6 victory over the St. Louis Rams after he was inactive for the first two games. On October 1, 2015, Coates made his first career catch on an 11-yard pass from Michael Vick during a 20–23 loss to the Baltimore Ravens. This was his only reception of his rookie season as he appeared minimally on special teams. Bryant returned the following week, pushing Coates to the fifth receiver on the depth chart. He appeared in six games in 2015. The Pittsburgh Steelers received a playoff berth after finishing second in the AFC North with a 10–6 record.

On January 17, 2016, he appeared in the first playoff game of his career after Brown was unable to play after suffering a concussion the previous game on a hit from Vontaze Burfict. Coates made two receptions for 61 yards in the Steelers' 16–23 loss to the Denver Broncos in the AFC Divisional Round of the playoffs.

==== 2016 ====
Coates competed with Wheaton and Heyward-Bey for the starting wide receiver job after Bryant was suspended for the entire 2016 season. He was named the third wide receiver on the depth chart behind Brown and Wheaton.

On September 12, 2016, he received his first career start against the Washington Redskins and finished the season-opener with two receptions for 56 yards in the Steelers' 38–16 victory. The following week, he earned two receptions for 97 yards and had the first rushing attempt of his career for a six-yard gain, as the Steelers defeated the Cincinnati Bengals 24–16. On October 9, 2016, Coates caught a 72-yard touchdown pass from Ben Roethlisberger, marking his first career touchdown in a 31–13 win over the New York Jets. Although he suffered an injury to his hand during the game, he managed to finish with a career-high six receptions for 139 receiving yards and two touchdown receptions. It was reported that he suffered a broken index finger and required stitches during the game against the Jets but was still activated for the following week against the Miami Dolphins. The injury limited him to two receptions for 14 receiving yards in the next nine games. He was deactivated for the last two games of the season (Weeks 16–17). He finished the season with 21 receptions for 435 receiving yards and two touchdowns in five starts and 14 games.

The Steelers finished first in the AFC North with an 11–5 record in 2016. On January 22, 2017, in the AFC Championship, Coates made two receptions for 34 yards in a 17–36 loss to the eventual Super Bowl LI Champion New England Patriots.

==== 2017 ====
On February 13, 2017, Coates underwent sports hernia surgery.

Coates competed with Bryant and rookie JuJu Smith-Schuster for the vacant starting wide receiver position left by the departure of Wheaton. Unfortunately, he missed half of training camp due a knee injury, that required knee arthroscopy and would require a recovery time.

=== Cleveland Browns ===
On September 2, 2017, the Steelers traded Coates and a 2019 seventh-round pick to the Cleveland Browns for a 2018 sixth-round pick. Coates became expendable after the Pittsburgh Steelers had acquired major depth at their wide receiver position with Bryant's return from suspension, Smith-Schuster's selection in the 2017 NFL draft, and the emergence of Eli Rogers in Coates absence the season prior. The Pittsburgh Steelers opted to go with veterans Heyward-Bey and Justin Hunter for their last two receiver spots.

Head coach Hue Jackson named Coates the fourth wide receiver behind Kenny Britt, Corey Coleman, and Rashard Higgins to start the 2017 season.

He made his Browns' debut in their 21–18 season-opening loss to his former team, the Steelers. On October 15, 2017, he caught a 14-yard pass from Kevin Hogan to mark his first reception as a member of the Cleveland Browns. They went on to lose 33–16 to the Houston Texans.

On March 15, 2018, Coates was released by the Browns.

=== Houston Texans ===
On March 16, 2018, Coates was claimed off of waivers by the Houston Texans. He played in 12 games for Houston, recording just one catch for 12 yards before being released on December 18.

=== Kansas City Chiefs ===
On February 22, 2019, Coates was signed by the Kansas City Chiefs. He was released by the Chiefs on May 10.

=== Houston Roughnecks ===
Coates was selected by the Houston Roughnecks of the XFL in the third round of the 2020 XFL draft. In four games played, Coates was targeted 19 times, but only caught six of those passes for 61 yards. He had his contract terminated when the league suspended operations on April 10, 2020.

=== Saskatchewan Roughriders ===
Coates signed with the Saskatchewan Roughriders of the Canadian Football League (CFL) on December 21, 2020. He was placed on the suspended list on July 3, 2021.

=== Edmonton Elks ===
Coates joined the Edmonton Elks of the CFL in free agency on February 15, 2023. He was released by the Elks after their final preseason game, along with 17 other players as the team trimmed down its roster ahead of the season.

== Personal life ==
Coates was raised in Leroy, Alabama to Sharon and Sammie Coates Sr. In November 2003, his father was killed in a car crash while driving to work at one of his two jobs.

After being drafted by the Steelers on May 1, 2015, Coates became engaged to his girlfriend Kailey Rogers. They would marry later that year. They have two sons together.

== Coaching career ==
On June 18, 2020, Coates was hired on the coaching staff at Jensen Beach High School at Jensen Beach, Florida.

On June 26, 2023, Coates was hired as the wide receivers coach at Ohio Northern University.

On March 29, 2024, Coates was hired as the wide receivers coach at Virginia–Wise.

On January 21, 2025, Coates was hired as the head football coach at Columbia High School in Huntsville, Alabama.

On August 22, 2026, Coates led Columbia High School to its first victory since 2015, breaking the nation's longest high school football losing streak after 101 consecutive losses.

=== Coaching record ===
Year	Team	Overall	Conference	Standing	Bowl/playoffs
Columbia Eagles () (2025–present)
2025	Columbia	0–10	0–6		
2026	Columbia	2–4	0–3		
Columbia:		2–14	0–9		
Total:		2–14			
