= Juan Pablo Oramas =

Mexican baseball player (born 1990)

Olmecas de Tabasco – No. 31
- Pitcher
- Born: May 11, 1990 (age 35); Villahermosa, Mexico
- Bats: Left Throws: Left
- Stats at Baseball Reference

Career highlights and awards
- Mexican League Rookie of the Year Award (2009)

Juan Pablo Oramas (born May 11, 1990) is a Mexican professional baseball relief pitcher for Olmecas de Tabasco of the Mexican League. He was signed by the San Diego Padres as an international free agent in 2006. Oramas is listed at 5 feet 10 inches (1.78 m) and 210 pounds (95 kg) and bats and throws left handed.

== Career ==
=== San Diego Padres ===
On November 26, 2006, Oramas signed with the San Diego Padres organization as an international free agent. He made his professional debut in 2007 with the Dominican Summer League Padres, logging a 3.81 ERA in 16 games. He returned to the team the following year and posted a 3–2 record and 1.02 ERA in 19 appearances. On April 2, 2009, Oramas was loaned to the Diablos Rojos del México of the Mexican League for the 2009 season. Oramas made 25 appearances for the team, pitching to a 9–1 record and 2.31 ERA with 89 strikeouts in 89 2/3 innings of work. Oramas split the 2010 season between the Single-A Fort Wayne TinCaps and the High-A Lake Elsinore Storm, accumulating a 7–4 record and 2.37 ERA in 29 appearances. The following year, Oramas split the season between the Double-A San Antonio Missions and the Triple-A Tucson Padres, posting a cumulative 10–6 record and 3.49 ERA with 106 strikeouts in 108 1/3 innings pitched. On November 18, 2011, the Padres added Oramas to their 40-man roster to protect him from the Rule 5 draft.

In 2012, Oramas returned to San Antonio and recorded a 3–4 record and 6.37 ERA in eight games before undergoing Tommy John surgery (ulnar collateral ligament reconstruction in the elbow) on June 10, 2012. On November 30, Oramas was non-tendered by the Padres and became a free agent. On December 12, Oramas re-signed with the Padres on a minor league contract. He split the 2013 season between San Antonio and rehabbing with the rookie-level Arizona League Padres, registering a 3–2 record and 2.87 ERA in 14 appearances. On November 20, 2013, Oramas was re-selected to San Diego's 40-man roster. For the 2014 season, Oramas played for San Antonio and the Triple-A El Paso Chihuahuas, pitching to a 10–7 record and 4.75 ERA with 116 strikeouts in 136 1/3 innings of work across 27 games between the two teams. On December 16, 2014, Oramas was designated for assignment by the Padres following the signing of Brandon Morrow.

=== Toronto Blue Jays ===
On December 19, 2014, Oramas was claimed off waivers by the Toronto Blue Jays. On April 5, 2015, Oramas was designated for assignment by the Blue Jays and was granted his release two days later.

=== Diablos Rojos del México ===
On April 10, 2015, Oramas signed with the Diablos Rojos del México of the Mexican League. In 22 games for the team, Oramas recorded an 8–4 record and 4.29 ERA with 91 strikeouts in 113 1/3 innings of work, earning his way to a Mexican League All-Star selection. In 2016, Oramas played in 23 games for the Diablos, registering a 7–4 record and 4.60 ERA in 20 appearances. The following season, Oramas pitched in 15 games for México, but struggled to a 1–6 record and 6.68 ERA.

=== Olmecas de Tabasco ===
On January 10, 2018, Oramas was traded to the Guerreros de Oaxaca of the Mexican League in exchange for Sergio Valenzuela. Five days later, on January 15, Oramas was traded to the Olmecas de Tabasco of the Mexican League in exchange for Salvador Valdez. Oramas made 20 appearances for Tabasco in 2018, accumulating a 8–5 record with 50 strikeouts. In 2019 with Tabasco, Oramas appeared in 23 games and pitched to a 6–10 record and 3.85 ERA with 145 strikeouts in 140 1/3 innings pitched. Oramas did not play in a game in 2020 due to the cancellation of the Mexican League season because of the COVID-19 pandemic.

Oramas made 18 starts for Tabasco in 2024, compiling a 10–6 record and 4.44 ERA with 71 strikeouts across 93 1/3 innings pitched. His 10 wins were tied for the league lead alongside Trevor Bauer and César Valdez.

== International career ==
Oramas was on the Mexico national baseball team at the 2020 Summer Olympics (contested in 2021).
