= Agustin Murillo =

Mexican baseball player (born 1982)

Agustín Murillo
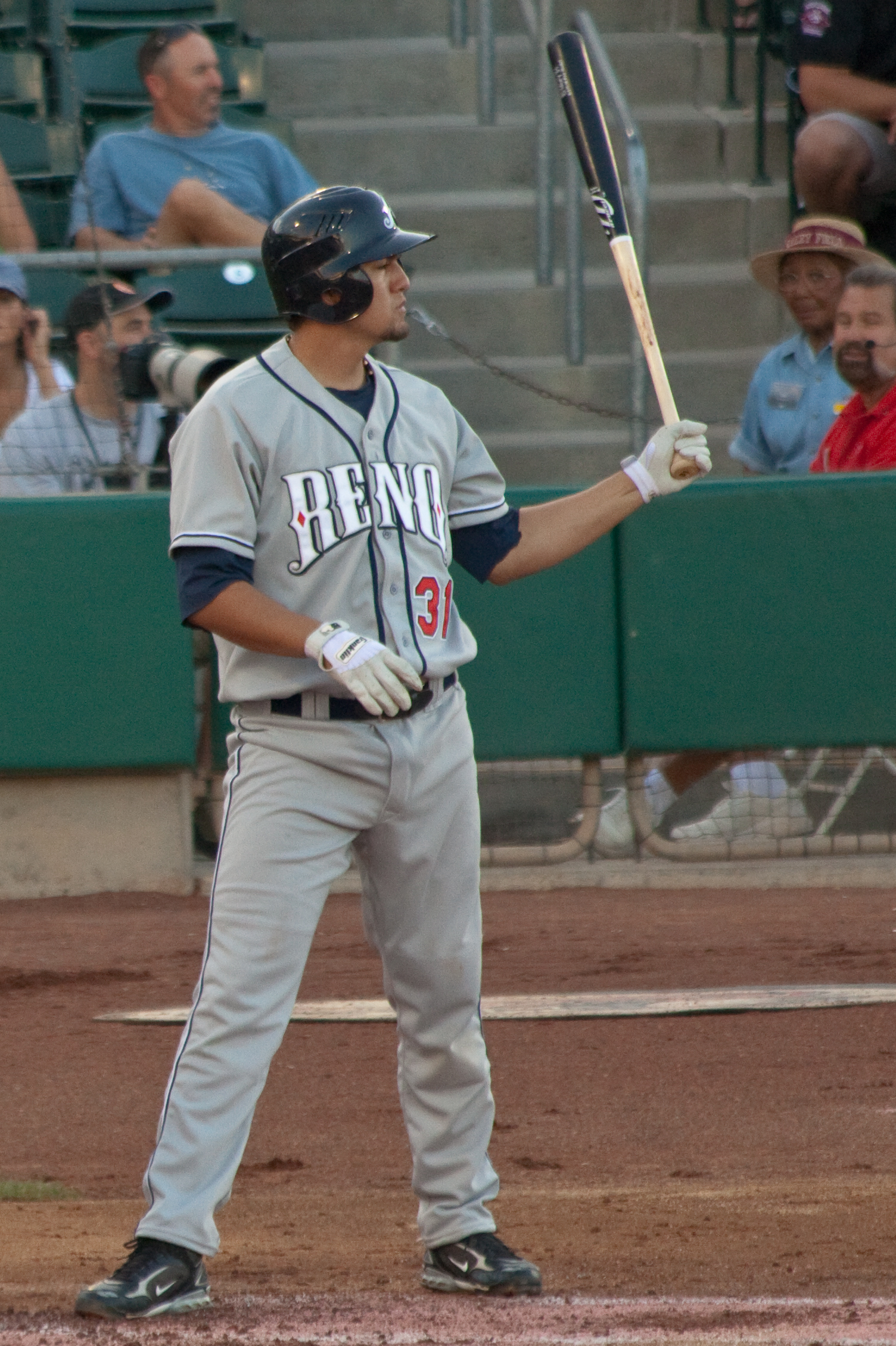
- Murillo with the Reno Aces

Olmecas de Tabasco – No. 50
- Third baseman
- Born: May 5, 1982 (age 44); Tijuana, Baja California, Mexico
- Bats: Right Throws: Right

NPB debut
- September 13, 2015, for the Tohoku Rakuten Golden Eagles

NPB statistics (through 2015 season)
- Batting average: .313
- Home runs: 0
- Runs batted in: 1
- Stats at Baseball Reference

Teams
- Tohoku Rakuten Golden Eagles (2015)

Agustín Murillo Pineda (born May 5, 1982) is a Mexican professional baseball infielder for the Olmecas de Tabasco of the Mexican League. He has previously played in Nippon Professional Baseball (NPB) for the Tohoku Rakuten Golden Eagles.

== Career ==
=== Arizona Diamondbacks ===
Murillo was signed by the Arizona Diamondbacks as an undrafted free agent in 2002. In 2007, Murillo was loaned to the Dorados de Chihuahua of the Mexican League. In 2008, he was loaned to the Sultanes de Monterrey of the Mexican League, where he was a candidate for Most Valuable Player. On May 15, 2009, Murillo was suspended 50 games after testing positive for the performance-enhancing substance Clenbuterol. On November 9, he elected free agency. At the time, Murillo had a career .275/.344/.399 batting line with 36 home runs and 236 RBI in 514 minor league games.

=== Sultanes de Monterrey ===
On March 16, 2010, Murillo signed with the Sultanes de Monterrey of the Mexican League. He played in 99 games that season, batting .293/.392/.432 with 7 home runs and 48 RBI. In 2011 with Monterrey, Murillo slashed .301/.389/.438 with 11 home runs and 58 RBI. The next season he batted .282/.359/.416 with 10 home runs and 55 RBI. Appearing in 108 games in 2013, Murillo had a torrid batting line of .337/.427/.478 to go along with 10 home runs and 56 RBI. In 2014, Murillo hit .340/.417/.583 with a career-high 24 home runs and 95 RBI. In 2015, Murillo batted .279/.347/.420 with 11 home runs and 58 RBI before being released on August 6.

=== Tohoku Rakuten Golden Eagles ===
After his release, Murillo signed with the Tohoku Rakuten Golden Eagles of Nippon Professional Baseball. Murillo played in nine games for the Eagles, slashing .313/.405/.344 with one RBI and two stolen bases.

=== Sultanes de Monterrey (second stint) ===
On April 1, 2016, Murillo returned to the Sultanes de Monterrey of the Mexican League. On the year, he made 107 appearances for Monterrey, batting .303/.377/.419 with seven home runs, 44 RBI, and 16 stolen bases. The next season, Murillo slashed .287/.370/.397 with five home runs, 23 RBI, and five stolen bases in only 58 games. In 2018, Murillo notched 16 home runs, 70 RBI, and 12 stolen bases in 398 at-bats across 104 appearances.

In the 2019 season, Murillo appeared in 108 games for Monterrey, batting .294/.365/.444 with 13 home runs, 71 RBI, and 14 stolen bases. Murillo did not play in a game in 2020 due to the cancellation of the LMB season because of the COVID-19 pandemic.

=== Bravos de León ===
On April 16, 2021, Murillo was loaned to the Bravos de León of the Mexican League. In 30 appearances for León, he slashed .368/.429/.487 with two home runs, 17 RBI, and one stolen base.

=== Sultanes de Monterrey (third stint) ===
On June 27, 2021, Murillo was loaned back to the Sultanes de Monterrey. He made 14 appearances for Monterrey, hitting .404/.458/.577 with two home runs, 11 RBI, and one stolen base.

=== Toros de Tijuana ===
On September 27, 2021, Murillo, along with IF Amadeo Zazueta and P Nick Struck, were traded to the Toros de Tijuana of the Mexican League. Murillo made 52 appearances for Tijuana during the 2022 campaign, batting .289/.386/.387 with three home runs, 29 RBI, and three stolen bases.

=== Rieleros de Aguascalientes ===
On December 30, 2022, Murillo was traded to the Rieleros de Aguascalientes of the Mexican League in exchange for IF Marc Flores. He played in 76 games for Aguascalientes in 2023, batting .252/.343/.312 with no home runs and 26 RBI.

=== Leones de Yucatán ===
On July 31, 2023, Murillo signed with the Leones de Yucatán of the Mexican League. He appeared in only five games for the Leones, going 6–for–22 (.273) with two RBI.

=== Conspiradores de Querétaro ===
On November 30, 2023, Murillo was traded to the Conspiradores de Querétaro. He played in 16 games for Querétaro in 2024, slashing .250/.385/.346 with 10 RBI and four stolen bases.

=== Tigres de Quintana Roo ===
On October 21, 2024, Murillo was traded to the Rieleros de Aguascalientes of the Mexican League. However, on November 8, Murillo was traded to the Tigres de Quintana Roo in exchange for Javier Erro. He made 50 appearances for Quintana Roo, batting .249/.321/.318 with two home runs, 14 RBI, and nine stolen bases. On June 21, 2025, Murillo was released by the Tigres.

=== Dorados de Chihuahua ===
On June 26, 2025, Murillo signed with the Dorados de Chihuahua of the Mexican League. He appeared in 30 games for the Dorados, batting .250/.367/.370 with one home run, 12 RBI, and four stolen bases.

=== Olmecas de Tabasco ===
On March 30, 2026, Murillo was traded to the Olmecas de Tabasco of the Mexican League.
