= Vicente Palacios =

Vicente Palacios may refer to:

- Vicente Palacios (baseball) (Vicente Palacios Díaz, born 1963), Mexican baseball professional
- Vicente Palacios (footballer) (Vicente Palacios González, 1900–1936), Spanish footballer
- Vicente Palacios Baeza, Chilean Minister of War and Navy 1901
