= José Godoy =

Venezuelan baseball player (born 1994)

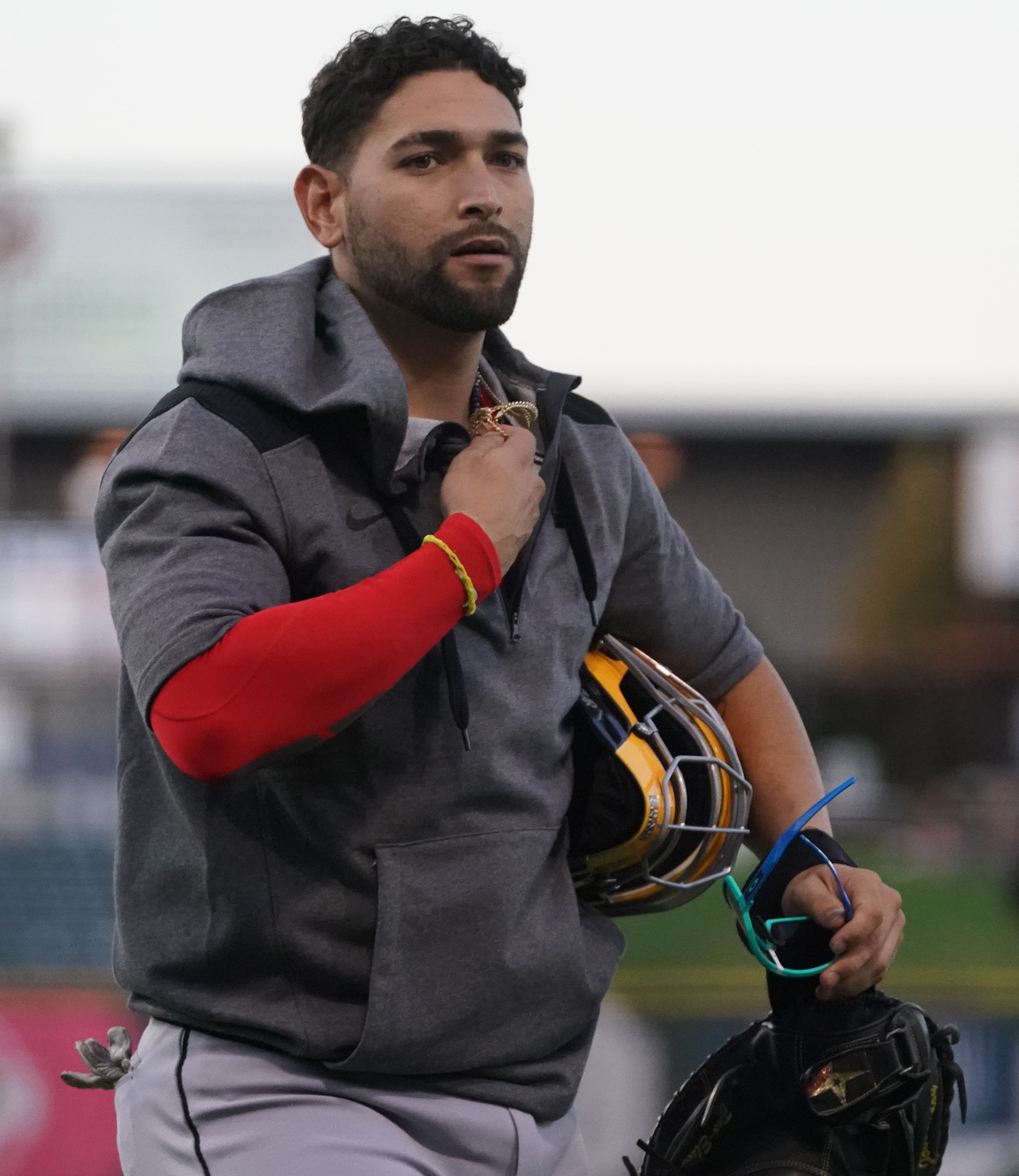
- Godoy with the Indianapolis Indians in 2022

Olmecas de Tabasco – No. 77
- Catcher
- Born: October 13, 1994 (age 32); Maracaibo, Venezuela
- Bats: Left Throws: Right

MLB debut
- May 21, 2021, for the Seattle Mariners

MLB statistics (through 2022 season)
- Batting average: .123
- Home runs: 0
- Runs batted in: 4
- Stats at Baseball Reference

Teams
- Seattle Mariners (2021); Minnesota Twins (2022); Pittsburgh Pirates (2022)

José Alberto Godoy Araujo (born October 13, 1994) is a Venezuelan professional baseball catcher for the Olmecas de Tabasco of the Mexican League. He has previously played in Major League Baseball (MLB) for the Seattle Mariners, Minnesota Twins, and Pittsburgh Pirates. He was signed by the St. Louis Cardinals as an international free agent in 2011. When he made his MLB debut on May 21, 2021, he became the 20,000th player in MLB history.

== Career ==
=== St. Louis Cardinals ===
On July 2, 2011, Godoy signed with the St. Louis Cardinals as an international free agent. He made his professional debut with the DSL Cardinals in 2012. In 2013, he played for the GCL Cardinals, slashing .263/.368/.307 in 36 games.

Godoy split the 2014 season between the rookie ball Johnson City Cardinals and the High-A Palm Beach Cardinals, posting a batting line of .320/.411/.377 in 122 at-bats. He split 2015 between Palm Beach and the Low-A State College Spikes, batting .230/.331/.310. In 2016, he played tor the Single-A Peoria Chiefs and the Double-A Springfield Cardinals, hitting .295/.373/.344 with 1 home run and a career-high 31 RBI. He played 2017 in Palm Beach, slashing .265/.317/.374 with career-highs in home runs (4) and RBI (41). He split 2018 between Springfield and Palm Beach, hitting .281/.368/.360 in 77 games.

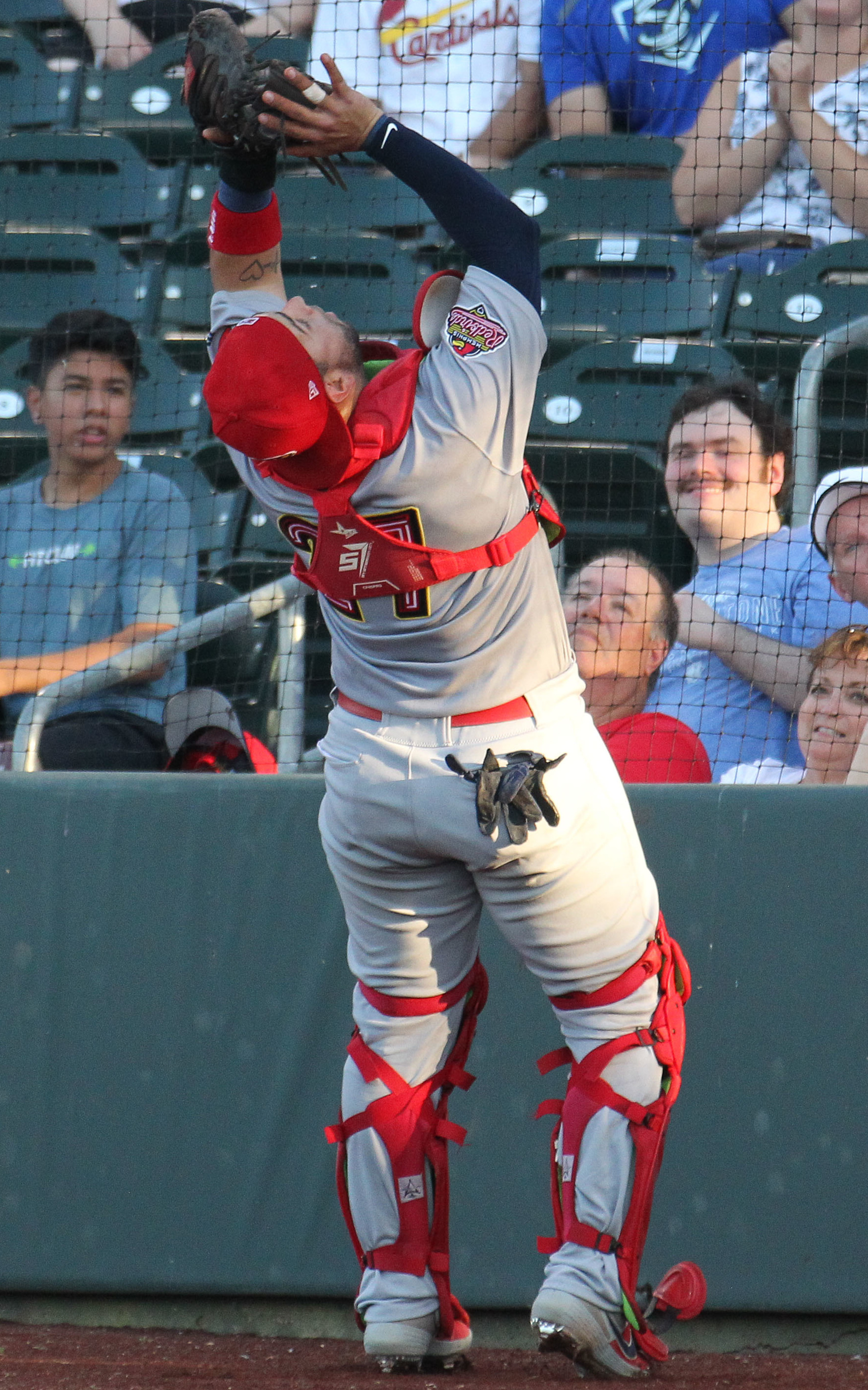
Godoy with the Memphis Redbirds in 2019

On November 19, 2018, Godoy re-signed with the Cardinals on a new minor league contract that included an invitation to Spring Training. He did not make the club and was assigned to Springfield. In 2019, Godoy reached Triple-A for the first time with the Memphis Redbirds, splitting the season between Memphis and Springfield, slashing .276/.354/.431 with 7 home runs and 42 RBI. He was invited to Spring Training for the 2020 season. Godoy did not play in a game in 2020 due to the cancellation of the minor league season because of the COVID-19 pandemic. He was added to the Cardinals 60-man player pool but did not make an appearance for the club. On November 2, 2020, Godoy elected free agency.

=== Seattle Mariners ===
On November 20, 2020, Godoy signed a minor league contract with the Seattle Mariners organization. He was assigned to the Triple-A Tacoma Rainiers to begin the 2021 season. On May 20, 2021, Godoy was selected to the 40-man roster and promoted to the major leagues for the first time. Godoy made his MLB debut that night against the San Diego Padres as a replacement for fellow backstop Tom Murphy. Godoy also became the 20,000th player in MLB history. In his rookie campaign, Godoy appeared in 16 major league games, hitting .162/.225/.189 with 3 RBI.

=== Minnesota Twins ===
On March 13, 2022, Godoy was claimed off waivers by the San Francisco Giants. Godoy was subsequently waived by the Giants and claimed by the Minnesota Twins on March 17. Godoy was designated for assignment on April 6. On April 10, Godoy was sent outright to the Triple-A St. Paul Saints. On April 23, the Twins promoted Godoy to the major leagues. He made two appearances for the Twins, going 0-for-3 with two walks. On August 1, Godoy was designated for assignment by Minnesota.

=== Pittsburgh Pirates ===
On August 5, 2022, Godoy was claimed off waivers by the Pittsburgh Pirates. On August 20, Godoy was designated for assignment. After clearing waivers, he was outrighted to the Triple-A Indianapolis Indians on August 23. On September 26, Godoy was selected to the major league roster after Tyler Heineman suffered a concussion. He appeared in 8 games for Pittsburgh, going 1–for–17 (.059) with an RBI. Godoy was once again designated for assignment on October 18, following the waiver claims of Ali Sánchez and Beau Sulser. He cleared waivers and was sent outright to Triple–A on October 26, but elected free agency the following day.

=== New York Yankees ===
On December 16, 2022, Godoy signed a minor league deal with the Los Angeles Angels. He was released by the team prior to the start of the regular season on March 14, 2023.

On March 23, 2023, Godoy signed a minor league contract with the New York Yankees organization. He played in 11 games for the Triple-A Scranton/Wilkes-Barre RailRiders, hitting .270/.342/.514 with three home runs and seven RBI.

=== Baltimore Orioles ===
On June 2, 2023, Godoy was traded to the Baltimore Orioles. On June 17, after 7 games with the Triple–A Norfolk Tides, Godoy was selected to the major league roster following an injury to James McCann. Godoy did not make an appearance for Baltimore, and was outrighted off of the roster on June 26 following the promotion of Jordan Westburg. In 25 games for Norfolk, he hit .266/.363/.342 with one home run and 7 RBI. On October 13, Godoy elected free agency.

=== Philadelphia Phillies ===
On February 5, 2024, Godoy signed a minor league contract with the Texas Rangers.

On March 28, 2024, Godoy signed a minor league contract with the Philadelphia Phillies. In 20 games for the Triple–A Lehigh Valley IronPigs, he batted .143/.226/.161 with no home runs and one RBI. Godoy was released by the Phillies organization on July 14.

=== Algodoneros de Unión Laguna ===
On January 5, 2025, Godoy signed with the Algodoneros de Unión Laguna of the Mexican League. In 14 appearances for Unión Laguna, he batted .209/.292/.279 with eight RBI. Godoy was released by the Algodoneros on June 5.

=== Dorados de Chihuahua ===
On July 10, 2025, Godoy signed with the Dorados de Chihuahua of the Mexican League. In 12 appearances for Chihuahua, he batted .278/.381/.417 with one home run and three RBI.

On January 8, 2026, Godoy was traded to the Leones de Yucatán of the Mexican League. However, he was released prior to the season on February 25.

=== Olmecas de Tabasco ===
On April 24, 2026, Godoy signed with the Olmecas de Tabasco of the Mexican League.
