= Domingo Leyba =

Dominican baseball player (born 1995)

Olmecas de Tabasco – No. 12
- Infielder
- Born: September 11, 1995 (age 30); Santo Domingo, Dominican Republic
- Bats: Switch Throws: Right

MLB debut
- June 22, 2019, for the Arizona Diamondbacks

MLB statistics (through 2021 season)
- Batting average: .152
- Home runs: 1
- Runs batted in: 9
- Stats at Baseball Reference

Teams
- Arizona Diamondbacks (2019, 2021); Baltimore Orioles (2021)

Domingo Junior Leyba Santana (born September 11, 1995) is a Dominican professional baseball infielder for the Olmecas de Tabasco of the Mexican League. He has previously played in Major League Baseball (MLB) for the Arizona Diamondbacks and Baltimore Orioles.

== Career ==
=== Detroit Tigers ===
Leyba was signed by the Detroit Tigers as an international free agent in July 2012. He made his professional debut in 2013 with the Dominican Summer League Tigers and spent the whole season there where he led the league with a .348 batting average in 57 games. He spent 2014 with the Connecticut Tigers and West Michigan Whitecaps, hitting .323 with two home runs and 24 RBIs in 67 games.

=== Arizona Diamondbacks ===
On December 5, 2014, the Tigers traded Leyba and Robbie Ray to the Arizona Diamondbacks as part of a three-team trade, with the Diamondbacks sending Didi Gregorius to the New York Yankees and the Yankees sending Shane Greene to the Tigers. He spent 2015 with the Visalia Rawhide where he batted .237 with two home runs and 43 RBIs in 124 games and 2016 with Visalia and the Mobile BayBears where he slashed .296/.355/.429 with ten home runs and 60 RBIs in 130 games.

The Diamondbacks added him to their 40-man roster after the 2016 season. In 2017, he played in only 23 games due to injury. He spent all of 2018 with the Jackson Generals, batting .269 with five home runs and 30 RBIs in 86 games. He began 2019 with the Reno Aces.

On June 22, 2019, he was called up to the major leagues for the first time. He made his debut that night, recording a pinch-hit single off of Mark Melancon of the San Francisco Giants. Leyba played in 21 major league games in 2019, mainly as a pinch hitter and defensive replacement. He collected a total of seven hits, including two doubles and a triple, batting.280.

On March 6, 2020, Leyba was suspended for the first 80 games of the 2020 season for testing positive for boldenone. Due to Major League Baseball shortening the season to 60 games because of the COVID-19 pandemic, Leyba was essentially ruled out for the entire year. On November 20, 2020, Leyba was outrighted off of the 40-man roster following the waiver claim of Rogelio Armenteros.

On May 15, 2021, Leyba was selected to the 40-man roster. He was designated for assignment on June 2 after going hitless in 24 plate appearances across 13 games for Arizona.

=== Baltimore Orioles ===
On June 4, 2021, Leyba was claimed off waivers by the Baltimore Orioles. Leyba hit his first career home run on July 2 on the road against Griffin Canning of the Los Angeles Angels. On August 4, Leyba was designated for assignment by the Orioles. On August 8, Leyba cleared waivers and was assigned outright to the Triple-A Norfolk Tides. On August 19, Leyba was released by the Orioles.

=== Texas Rangers ===
On September 3, 2021, Leyba signed a minor league deal with the Texas Rangers and was assigned to the Triple-A Round Rock Express. Leyba played in 24 games for Round Rock, hitting .288 with 4 home runs and 26 RBI's. Leyba became a free agent following the season.

=== San Diego Padres ===
On December 14, 2021, Leyba signed with the San Diego Padres. Leyba spent the majority of the 2022 season (98 games) with the Double-A San Antonio Missions, also playing in 10 games for the Triple-A El Paso Chihuahuas. Between the two affiliates, he posted a .255/.356/.399 slash with 11 home runs, 64 RBI, and 12 stolen bases. He elected free agency following the season on November 10, 2022.

=== Pittsburgh Pirates ===
On March 3, 2023, Leyba signed a minor league contract with the Pittsburgh Pirates organization. He split the season between the Double–A Altoona Curve and Triple–A Indianapolis Indians, playing in 72 total games and hitting .293/.371/.443 with 8 home runs and 35 RBI. Leyba elected free agency following the season on November 6.

=== Olmecas de Tabasco ===
On February 21, 2024, Leyba signed with the Olmecas de Tabasco of the Mexican League. In 54 appearances for Tabasco, he batted .216/.297/.314 with two home runs and 17 RBI.

Leyba made 85 appearances for the Olmecas during the 2025 campaign, batting .306/.385/.478 with 11 home runs, 51 RBI, and 10 stolen bases.
