= Olmecas de Tabasco =

Professional baseball team in the Mexican League

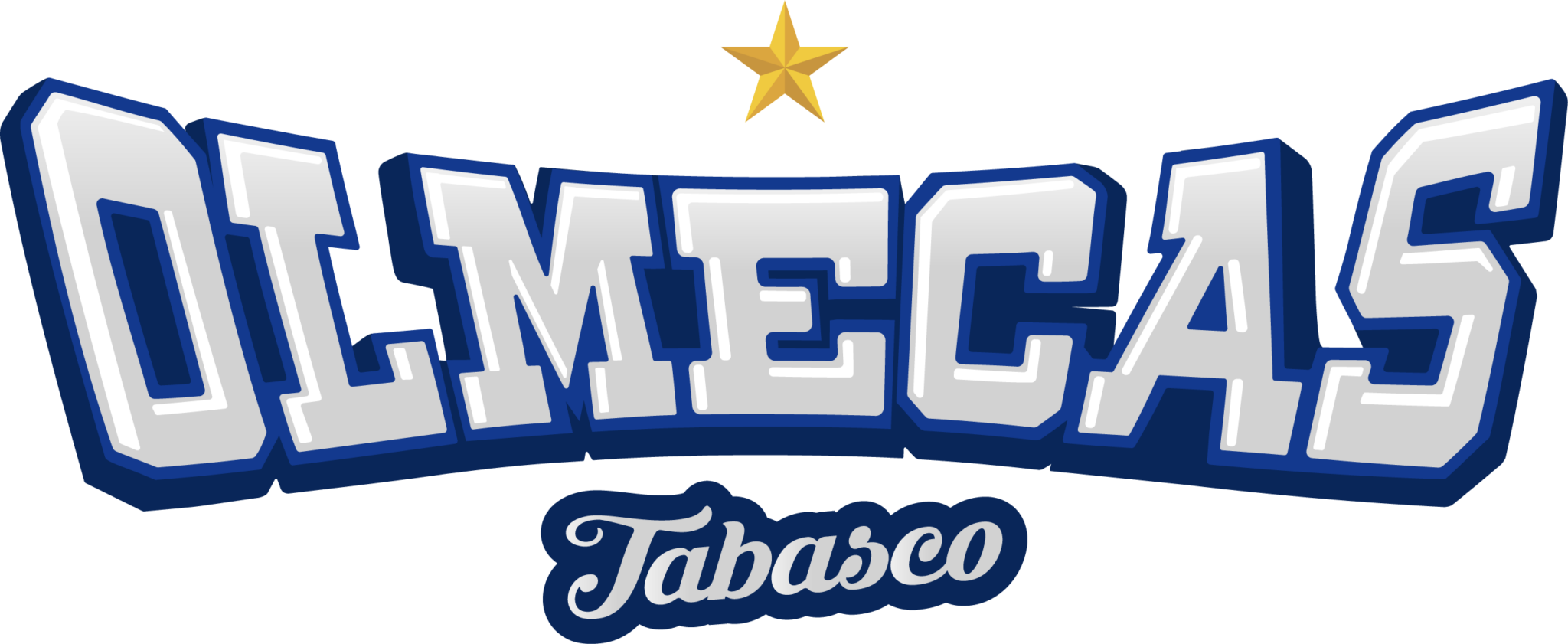

| Logo | Cap insignia |

Information
- League: Mexican League (South Zone)
- Location: Villahermosa, Tabasco, Mexico
- Ballpark: Estadio Centenario Orsan
- Founded: 1975
- Serie del Rey championships: 1 (1993)
- Division championships: 2 (1993, 2026)
- Former name: Ganaderos de Tabasco (1985–1989); Plataneros de Tabasco (1977–1984); Cardenales de Tabasco (1975)
- Colors: Blue, red, white
- President: Daniel Gómez Arellano
- Manager: Luis Rivera

Current uniforms
| Home | Away |

The Olmecas de Tabasco (English: Tabasco Olmecs) are a professional baseball team in the Mexican League based in Villahermosa, Tabasco, Mexico. Their home ballpark is the Estadio Centenario 27 de Febrero.

The Olmecas began playing in the Mexican League in 1975 and have had many nicknames over the years: Cardenales de Tabasco (1975), the Plataneros de Tabasco (1977–85), and the Ganaderos de Tabasco (1985–89). They became the Olmecas in 1990. In 1998, they played as the Ganaderos for two seasons before returning to the Olmecas name for the 2000 season.

The Olmecas won their only Mexican League championship in 1993 under manager Juan Navarrete. The Olmecas have long been known for their pitching, especially Emigdio López, Cecilio Ruiz, Juan Jesús Álvarez, Jesús "Chito" Ríos, Ricardo Osuna, and Gaudencio Aguirre. Other well-known players who have played for the Olmecas include catcher Elisha Garzón, first baseman Jay Gainer, second baseman Joel Serna, third baseman Manuel Ramirez, and shortstop Heber Gómez. Rusty Tillman, Oscar Zambrano, Rosario Zambrano, Arturo Bernal, and Carlos Sievers have all been stars in the outfield in Villahermosa.

== History ==
=== Cardenales de Tabasco (1975) ===
Tabasco debuted in the Mexican League in 1975 as the Cardenales de Tabasco (Tabasco Cardinals). The team was established after the Magaña Carrillo brothers bought the Leones de Yucatán from Cervecería Yucateca and relocated the club to Villahermosa, Tabasco. Ariel Magaña, one of the owners, was a fan of the St. Louis Cardinals, so the team was named Cardenales de Tabasco, and its original uniform was identical to that of the Cardinals.

The Cardenales were managed by Pancho Herrera and later Pedro Ramos. Plagued with economic problems, they sat out the 1976 season, when the franchise was moved to Nuevo Laredo and became the Tecolotes de Nuevo Laredo, before returning to the league in 1977.

=== Plataneros de Tabasco (1977–1984) ===
When the club returned to play in 1977, they were renamed the Plataneros (Banana Growers), a name they kept until 1985. That year, the franchise purchased the Broncos de Reynosa and relocated to Tabasco. The team was initially managed by Napoleón Reyes and later by Bobby Treviño, finishing last in their division.

The Plataneros found their first success in 1979, when they qualified for the playoffs under manager Raúl Cano. The team included Arturo Bernal, Rommel Canada, Joel Orquendo, and Mike Nagy. As the 1980s began, the Plataneros signed stars Luis Tiant and Jesús Sommers but did not find success on the field.

=== Ganaderos de Tabasco (1985–1989) ===
In 1984, Julián Manzur, the club president, decided to sell the team. Humberto Tapia purchased the club and changed their name to the Ganaderos for 1985. In 1987, they signed Steve Howe, who was attempting a return to the major leagues after a drug suspension. He had great success and was signed by the Texas Rangers after 13 games.

Mike Cole stole 100 bases in the 1989 season and there was hope of a playoff appearance, but poor road trips against Campeche and Yucatán to end the season left them out of the postseason picture.

=== Olmecas de Tabasco (1990–present) ===
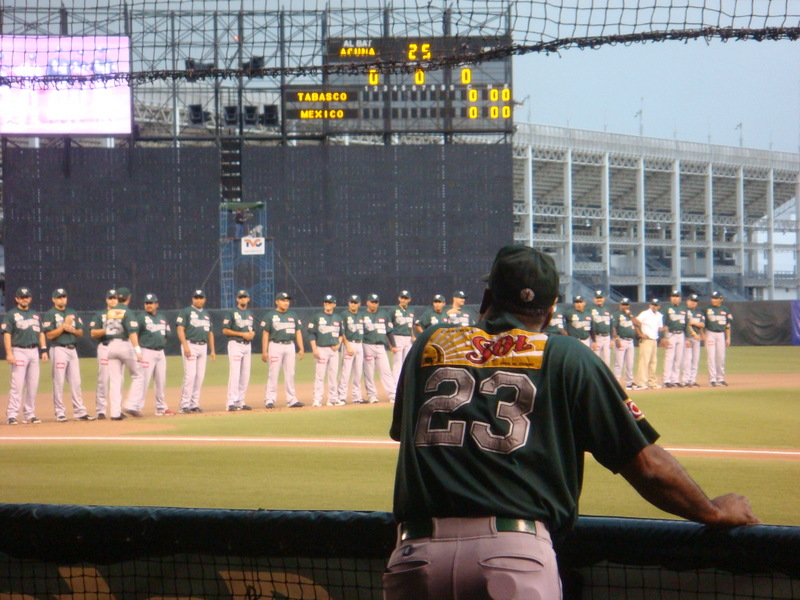
Manager Orlando Sánchez watches his players before the start of the first round of the 2007 playoffs against the Diablos Rojos del México

In 1990, the team, under new management, adopted the name Olmecas, replacing the previous Ganaderos name as part of an effort to establish a new identity for the club. The new name was selected with the participation of the Tabasco fanbase.

In 1993 Juan Navarrete took over as manager and the club signed many foreign players including Rafael de Lima, Alexis Infante, Rusty Tillman, and Todd Brown. The Olmecas ended a 14-year playoff drought and won the Mexican League title. Diego Rosique was named Executive of the Year and Ricardo Osuna won Pitcher of the Year.

In 2026, led by Luis Carlos Rivera, the Olmecas returned to the Serie del Rey for the first time in 33 years after defeating the Pericos de Puebla in the South Zone final. They ultimately fell to the Toros de Tijuana 2–4 in the Serie del Rey. Later, in October 2026, Rivera was awarded as the Mexican League Manager of the Year.

== Logos and uniforms ==
Upon its inception in 1975, the team was named the Cardenales, as Ariel Magaña, one of the team's owners, was a fan of the St. Louis Cardinals. This inspired both the team's name and its original visual identity. Its uniforms were identical to those of the Cardinals and the team's original logo was red and featured a stylized cardinal enclosed within a circular emblem bearing the words “TABASCO CARDENALES”.

Following a one-year absence from the Mexican League in 1976, the franchise returned in 1977 as the Plataneros de Tabasco, a name it retained through the 1984 season. The Plataneros' uniforms featured predominantly green, with yellow and brown also used in some designs to evoke the colors of a banana. Their logo depicted a stylized baseball player in a green and yellow uniform and cap, holding a bat, with a large green and yellow banana positioned behind him.

In 1985 the club was renamed the Ganaderos de Tabasco. The Ganaderos primarily wore green and white uniforms, with some designs featuring an entirely green uniform. The logo featured a stylized green letter “G,” representing Ganaderos, incorporating a pair of long, upward-curving bull horns, with white and green outlines.

In 1990, the team was renamed the Olmecas de Tabasco and adopted a new visual identity in white, blue, and red, influenced by its working agreement with the Texas Rangers. Its logo featured a stylized blue outline of the state of Tabasco, with a white baseball at its center containing a red depiction of an Olmec colossal head. The cap featured a stylized “T” closely resembling the Texas Rangers' insignia.

By the mid-2000s, the Olmecas had returned to green as their primary color. In 2025, the team introduced a blue alternate uniform featuring red lettering, recalling the club's original blue, red, and white identity. The following year, blue, red, and white were restored as the team's primary colors, marking a return to the color scheme associated with its 1993 championship.

== Roster ==
Olmecas de Tabasco roster
| Players | | Coaches/Other |
|---|---|---|
| Pitchers: 37 (United States) Clayton Andrews; 23 (United States) Nolan Blackwood; 43 (United States) Daniel Camarena; 94 (Dominican Republic) Jimmy Cordero; 93 (Mexico) Jonathan Cortés; 95 (United States) Jack Cushing; 15 (United States) Tyler Danish ∞; 51 (The Bahamas) Chavez Fernander ∞; 39 (Dominican Republic) Antonio Jiménez ∞; 35 (United States) Keone Kela; 96 (Mexico) Juan Macías; 31 (Mexico) Juan Pablo Oramas ∞; 72 (Dominican Republic) Francis Peguero; 22 (United States) Jeremy Rhoades; 59 (Mexico) Fernando Salas; 55 (Mexico) José Samayoa; 9 (United States) Alexandro Tovalin; 33 (Mexico) Carlos Vázquez; 78 (United States) Austin Warner; 0 (United States) Ronnie Williams | Catchers: 40 (Mexico) Antonio Almeida; 16 (Mexico) Alan Espinoza; 77 (Venezuela) José Godoy; Infielders: 3 (Mexico) Carlos Arellano; 7 (Mexico) Jasson Atondo; 28 (United States) Seth Beer; 45 (Venezuela) Angelo Castellano; 13 (Dominican Republic) Marco Hernández; 12 (Dominican Republic) Domingo Leyba; 50 (Mexico) Agustin Murillo; 8 (Dominican Republic) Yamaico Navarro ∞; Outfielders: 18 (United States) Phillip Ervin; 24 (United States) Calvin Estrada; 10 (Mexico) Luis González; 19 (Dominican Republic) Oscar González; 84 (Mexico) Héctor Hernández; 2 (Mexico) Randy Romero; 32 (Mexico) Agustín Ruiz ∞ | Manager: 36 (Mexico) Luis Carlos Rivera; Coaches: -- (Dominican Republic) Claudio Almonte (hitting); -- (Mexico) Alberto Carreón (first base); -- (Mexico) Abel Martínez (infield); -- (Mexico) Adán Muñoz (bench); -- (Mexico) Héctor Páez (catching); 80 (Mexico) Gilberto Sotomayor (third base); -- (Mexico) Luis Vázquez (bullpen); 76 (Mexico) Héctor Velázquez (pitching); 7-day injured list; ~ Development list; # Rehab assignment; ∞ Reserve list; ‡ Restricted list; § Suspended list; † Temporarily inactive list; Roster updated 8 September 2026; Transactions; → More rosters: MiLB • Mexican League |

== Championships ==
| Season | Manager | Opponent | Series score | Record |
|---|---|---|---|---|
| 1993 | Juan Navarrete | Tecolotes de los Dos Laredos | 4–1 | 78–64 |
| Total championships | | | 1 | |
