= 2022 Mexican Baseball League season =

2022 Mexican League season
- League: Mexican League
- Sport: Baseball
- Duration: 21 April – 19 September
- Games: 810
- Teams: 18

Serie del Rey
- Champions: Leones de Yucatán
- Runners-up: Sultanes de Monterrey
- Finals MVP: Henderson Álvarez

LMB seasons
- ← 2021 2023 →

The 2022 Mexican League season was the 97th season in the history of the Mexican League. It was contested by 18 teams, evenly divided in North and South zones. The season started on 21 April with the series between the defending champions Toros de Tijuana and Diablos Rojos del México and ended on 19 September with the last game of the Serie del Rey, where Leones de Yucatán defeated Sultanes de Monterrey to win the championship.

== Standings ==
North
Rank	Team	W	L	Pct.	GB	STK
1	Toros de Tijuana	62	28	.689	–	W2
2	Tecolotes de los Dos Laredos	59	27	.686	1.0	W2
3	Acereros de Monclova	54	31	.635	5.5	W9
4	Sultanes de Monterrey	51	39	.567	11.0	L1
5	Algodoneros de Unión Laguna	48	40	.545	13.0	L2
6	Rieleros de Aguascalientes	42	46	.477	19.0	L2
7	Saraperos de Saltillo	38	52	.422	24.0	L9
8	Generales de Durango	37	53	.411	25.0	W1
9	Mariachis de Guadalajara	33	57	.367	29.0	W1

South
Rank	Team	W	L	Pct.	GB	STK
1	Diablos Rojos del México	50	34	.595	—	W6
2	Olmecas de Tabasco	47	37	.560	3.0	W6
3	Pericos de Puebla	48	39	.552	3.5	L3
4	Leones de Yucatán	46	43	.517	6.5	W5
5	Tigres de Quintana Roo	44	46	.489	9.0	W2
6	El Águila de Veracruz	41	48	.461	11.5	L2
7	Guerreros de Oaxaca	34	53	.391	17.5	L4
8	Piratas de Campeche	29	58	.333	22.5	L7
9	Bravos de León	29	61	.322	24.0	L1

== Postseason ==
First round
North
Toros de Tijuana	4
Rieleros de Aguascalientes	0
Tecolotes de los Dos Laredos	4
Algodoneros de Unión Laguna	1
Acereros de Monclova	1
Sultanes de Monterrey	4
South
Diablos Rojos del México	4
El Águila de Veracruz	0
Olmecas de Tabasco	1
Tigres de Quintana Roo	4
Pericos de Puebla	2
Leones de Yucatán	4

Zone Series
Toros de Tijuana	4
Acereros de Monclova	2
Tecolotes de los Dos Laredos	1
Sultanes de Monterrey	4
Diablos Rojos del México	4
Pericos de Puebla	0
Tigres de Quintana Roo	1
Leones de Yucatán	4

Championship Series
Toros de Tijuana	0
Sultanes de Monterrey	4
Diablos Rojos del México	3
Leones de Yucatán	4

Serie del Rey
Sultanes de Monterrey	3
Leones de Yucatán	4

=== First round ===
Toros de Tijuana won the series, 4–0.

Game	Date	Score	Location	Time	Attendance
1	9 August	Aguascalientes – 1, Tijuana – 12	Estadio Chevron	2:57	13,014
2	10 August	Aguascalientes – 2, Tijuana – 5	Estadio Chevron	3:21	16,831
3	12 August	Tijuana – 9, Aguascalientes – 1,	Parque Alberto Romo Chávez	3:20	4,370
4	14 August	Tijuana – 11, Aguascalientes – 1,	Parque Alberto Romo Chávez	2:50	1,560

Tecolotes de los Dos Laredos won the series, 4–1.

Game	Date	Score	Location	Time	Attendance
1	9 August	Unión Laguna – 0, Dos Laredos – 2	Parque la Junta	2:44	4,452
2	10 August	Unión Laguna – 4, Dos Laredos – 2	Parque la Junta	3:39	4,053
3	12 August	Dos Laredos – 2, Unión Laguna – 1	Estadio Revolución	3:49	7,392
4	13 August	Dos Laredos – 9, Unión Laguna – 4	Estadio Revolución	3:44	7,415
5	14 August	Dos Laredos – 15, Unión Laguna – 2	Estadio Revolución	3:47	6,115

Sultanes de Monterrey won the series, 4–1.

Game	Date	Score	Location	Time	Attendance
1	9 August	Monterrey – 5, Monclova – 3	Estadio de Béisbol Monclova	3:18	8,500
2	10 August	Monterrey – 4, Monclova – 5	Estadio de Béisbol Monclova	3:36	8,500
3	12 August	Monclova – 2, Monterrey – 4	Estadio Mobil Super	2:43	13,190
4	13 August	Monclova – 6, Monterrey – 11	Estadio Mobil Super	3:02	14,920
5	14 August	Monclova – 5, Monterrey – 6	Estadio Mobil Super	3:48	10,644

Diablos Rojos del México won the series, 4–0.

Game	Date	Score	Location	Time	Attendance
1	10 August	Veracruz – 10, México – 13	Estadio Alfredo Harp Helú	3:39	7,345
2	11 August	Veracruz – 4, México – 12	Estadio Alfredo Harp Helú	3:29	10,817
3	13 August	México – 8, Veracruz – 3	Estadio Universitario Beto Ávila	3:47	7,000
4	14 August	México – 4, Veracruz – 2	Estadio Universitario Beto Ávila	3:31	6,500

Leones de Yucatán won the series, 4–2.

Game	Date	Score	Location	Time	Attendance
1	10 August	Yucatán – 12, Puebla – 10	Estadio Hermanos Serdán	4:03	6,032
2	11 August	Yucatán – 6, Puebla – 7	Estadio Hermanos Serdán	3:54	8,089
3	13 August	Puebla – 7, Yucatán – 6	Parque Kukulcán Alamo	4:11	10,191
4	14 August	Puebla – 0, Yucatán – 1	Parque Kukulcán Alamo	2:46	10,641
5	15 August	Puebla – 3, Yucatán – 4	Parque Kukulcán Alamo	2:58	11,189
6	17 August	Yucatán – 20, Puebla – 17	Estadio Hermanos Serdán	5:05	8,105

Tigres de Quintana Roo won the series, 4–1.

Game	Date	Score	Location	Time	Attendance
1	10 August	Quintana Roo – 1, Tabasco – 6	Estadio Ángel Toledo Meza	3:24	4,413
2	11 August	Quintana Roo – 3, Tabasco – 1	Estadio Ángel Toledo Meza	3:33	4,396
3	13 August	Tabasco – 3, Quintana Roo – 5	Estadio de Béisbol Beto Ávila	2:43	8,977
4	14 August	Tabasco – 3, Quintana Roo – 4	Estadio de Béisbol Beto Ávila	3:35	7,834
5	15 August	Tabasco – 4, Quintana Roo – 13	Estadio de Béisbol Beto Ávila	4:06	8,517

=== Zone Series ===
Toros de Tijuana won the series, 4–2.

Game	Date	Score	Location	Time	Attendance
1	19 August	Monclova – 13, Tijuana – 1	Estadio Chevron	3:30	16,001
2	20 August	Monclova – 4, Tijuana – 5	Estadio Chevron	3:25	16,103
3	22 August	Tijuana – 7, Monclova – 11	Estadio de Béisbol Monclova	4:08	8,500
4	23 August	Tijuana – 15, Monclova – 2	Estadio de Béisbol Monclova	3:31	8,500
5	24 August	Tijuana – 9, Monclova – 2	Estadio de Béisbol Monclova	2:57	8,500
6	26 August	Monclova – 5, Tijuana - 12	Estadio Chevron	3:24	17,193

Sultanes de Monterrey won the series, 4–1.

Game	Date	Score	Location	Time	Attendance
1	19 August	Monterrey – 4, Dos Laredos – 2	Parque la Junta	4:28	5,585
2	20 August	Monterrey – 9, Dos Laredos – 3	Uni-Trade Stadium	4:01	5,139
3	22 August	Dos Laredos – 4, Monterrey – 2 (13 inn.)	Estadio Mobil Super	5:15	15,062
4	23 August	Dos Laredos – 4, Monterrey – 5	Estadio Mobil Super	3:19	15,395
5	24 August	Dos Laredos – 2, Monterrey – 7	Estadio Mobil Super	3:10	12,160

Diablos Rojos del México won the series, 4–0.

Game	Date	Score	Location	Time	Attendance
1	20 August	Puebla – 6, México – 10	Estadio Alfredo Harp Helú	3:50	13,421
2	21 August	Puebla – 7, México – 17	Estadio Alfredo Harp Helú	3:34	14,421
3	23 August	México – 15, Puebla – 8	Estadio Hermanos Serdán	4:04	6,768
4	24 August	México – 15, Puebla – 5	Estadio Hermanos Serdán	3:41	5,834

Leones de Yucatán won the series, 4–1.

Game	Date	Score	Location	Time	Attendance
1	20 August	Quintana Roo – 1, Yucatán – 9	Parque Kukulcán Alamo	3:21	12,184
2	21 August	Quintana Roo – 4, Yucatán – 5 (12 inn.)	Parque Kukulcán Alamo	4:59	12,598
3	23 August	Yucatán – 11, Quintana Roo – 8	Estadio de Béisbol Beto Ávila	4:39	9,063
4	24 August	Yucatán – 4, Quintana Roo – 6	Estadio de Béisbol Beto Ávila	3:25	9,000
5	25 August	Yucatán – 6, Quintana Roo – 0	Estadio de Béisbol Beto Ávila	3:08	9,001

=== Championship Series ===
Sultanes de Monterrey won the series, 4–0.

Game	Date	Score	Location	Time	Attendance
1	29 August	Monterrey – 6, Tijuana – 2	Estadio Chevron	4:09	10,081
2	30 August	Monterrey – 4, Tijuana – 1	Estadio Chevron	3:13	15,313
3	1 September	Tijuana – 1, Monterrey – 2 (13 inn.)	Estadio Mobil Super	4:52	17,241
4	2 September	Tijuana – 11, Monterrey – 12	Estadio Mobil Super	4:27	21,000

Leones de Yucatán won the series, 4–3.

Game	Date	Score	Location	Time	Attendance
1	30 August	Yucatán – 10, México – 11 (11 inn.)	Estadio Alfredo Harp Helú	5:34	14,528
2	31 August	Yucatán – 15, México – 8	Estadio Alfredo Harp Helú	4:41	18,851
3	2 September	México – 8, Yucatán – 3	Parque Kukulcán Alamo	4:00	14,917
4	3 September	México – 6, Yucatán – 5	Parque Kukulcán Alamo	4:04	14,917
5	4 September	México – 0, Yucatán – 2	Parque Kukulcán Alamo	3:19	14,917
6	6/7 September	Yucatán – 21, México – 18 (10 inn.)	Estadio Alfredo Harp Helú	6:07	18,916
7	8 September	Yucatán – 7, México – 5	Estadio Alfredo Harp Helú	4:12	10,497

=== Serie del Rey ===
==== Summary ====
Leones de Yucatán won the series, 4–3.

Game	Date	Score	Location	Time	Attendance
1	10 September	Yucatán – 3, Monterrey – 4	Estadio Mobil Super	3:40	19,026
2	11 September	Yucatán – 1, Monterrey – 0	Estadio Mobil Super	3:31	21,909
3	14 September	Monterrey – 1, Yucatán – 6	Parque Kukulcán Alamo	3:11	14,917
4	15 September	Monterrey – 5, Yucatán – 0	Parque Kukulcán Alamo	4:06	14,917
5	16 September	Monterrey – 6, Yucatán – 3	Parque Kukulcán Alamo	4:04	14,917
6	18 September	Yucatán – 6, Monterrey – 2	Estadio Mobil Super	4:29	21,909
7	19 September	Yucatán – 6, Monterrey – 1	Estadio Mobil Super	3:55	21,909

==== Game summaries ====
===== Game 1 =====
10 September 2022 5:20 p.m. (UTC–5) at Estadio Mobil Super in Monterrey, Nuevo León, 31 °C, partly cloudy
Team	1	2	3	4	5	6	7	8	9	R	H	E
Yucatán	1	0	0	0	1	0	1	0	0	3	7	1
Monterrey	0	1	1	0	0	2	0	0	X	4	8	0
WP: Juan Gámez (1–0) LP: Manuel Chávez (0–1) Sv: Neftalí Feliz (1); Home runs: YUC: Sebastián Valle (1); MTY: None; Attendance: 19,026; Boxscore

===== Game 2 =====
11 September 2022 5:04 p.m. (UTC–5) at Estadio Mobil Super in Monterrey, Nuevo León, 32 °C, partly cloudy
Team	1	2	3	4	5	6	7	8	9	R	H	E
Yucatán	0	0	0	0	1	0	0	0	0	1	5	2
Monterrey	0	0	0	0	0	0	0	0	0	0	5	0
WP: Elián Leyva (1–0) LP: Julio Teherán (0–1) Sv: Jorge Rondón (1); Attendance: 21,909; Boxscore

===== Game 3 =====
14 September 2022 7:33 p.m. (UTC–5) at Parque Kukulcán Alamo in Mérida, Yucatán, 26 °C, cloudy
Team	1	2	3	4	5	6	7	8	9	R	H	E
Monterrey	0	0	0	0	1	0	0	0	0	1	7	0
Yucatán	0	3	0	0	3	0	0	0	X	6	12	1
WP: Henderson Álvarez (1–0) LP: Cristian Castillo (0–1); Attendance: 14,917; Boxscore

===== Game 4 =====
15 September 2022 8:02 p.m. (UTC–5) at Parque Kukulcán Alamo in Mérida, Yucatán, 24 °C, partly cloudy
Team	1	2	3	4	5	6	7	8	9	R	H	E
Monterrey	2	0	3	0	0	0	0	0	0	5	10	0
Yucatán	0	0	0	0	0	0	0	0	0	0	6	0
WP: Yohander Méndez (1–0) LP: Jake Thompson (0–1); Home runs: MTY: Sebastián Elizalde (1); YUC: None; Attendance: 14,917; Boxscore

===== Game 5 =====
16 September 2022 8:32 p.m. (UTC–5) at Parque Kukulcán Alamo in Mérida, Yucatán, 24 °C, cloudy
Team	1	2	3	4	5	6	7	8	9	R	H	E
Monterrey	0	1	0	1	0	0	2	2	0	6	8	0
Yucatán	0	0	0	1	2	0	0	0	0	3	7	0
WP: Juan Gámez (2–0) LP: Hunter Cervenka (0–1) Sv: Neftalí Feliz (2); Home runs: MTY: Zoilo Almonte (1); YUC: None; Attendance: 14,917; Boxscore

===== Game 6 =====
18 September 2022 5:00 p.m. (UTC–5) at Estadio Mobil Super in Monterrey, Nuevo León, 31 °C, partly cloudy
Team	1	2	3	4	5	6	7	8	9	R	H	E
Yucatán	2	0	1	0	0	0	0	3	0	6	10	1
Monterrey	0	0	0	1	0	0	1	0	0	2	6	4
WP: Hunter Cervenka (1–1) LP: Cristian Castillo (0–2); Attendance: 21,909; Boxscore

===== Game 7 =====
19 September 2022 7:33 p.m. (UTC–5) at Estadio Mobil Super in Monterrey, Nuevo León, 32 °C, partly cloudy
Team	1	2	3	4	5	6	7	8	9	R	H	E
Yucatán	1	0	0	0	1	0	3	0	1	6	9	0
Monterrey	0	0	0	0	0	0	0	0	1	1	8	0
WP: Henderson Álvarez (2–0) LP: Yohander Méndez (1–1); Home runs: YUC: José Martínez (1), Walter Ibarra (1); MTY: Zoilo Almonte (2); Attendance: 21,909; Boxscore

== League leaders ==
Batting leaders
Stat	Player	Team	Total
AVG	(Cuba) Henry Urrutia	Saltillo	.420
HR	(Cuba) Félix Pérez	Tijuana	38
HR	(Dominican Republic) Rainel Rosario	Saltillo	38
RBI	(Dominican Republic) Rainel Rosario	Saltillo	116
R	(Dominican Republic) Rainel Rosario	Saltillo	103
H	(Venezuela) Alberth Martínez	Durango	143
SB	(Colombia) Tito Polo	Quintana Roo	35

Pitching leaders
Stat	Player	Team	Total
ERA	(Venezuela) Yohander Méndez	Monterrey	2.78
W	(Mexico) Luis Márquez	Veracruz	9
W	(Mexico) Wilmer Rios	Monclova	9
L	(Mexico) Javier Solano	Tabasco	9
K	(Dominican Republic) Pedro Fernández	Quintana Roo	103
IP	(Mexico) David Reyes	Veracruz	96.2
SV	(Dominican Republic) Neftalí Feliz	Monterrey	24

== Milestones ==
=== Batters ===
- Tito Polo (TIG): On 22 April, Polo hit for the cycle against the Piratas de Campeche.
- Addison Russell (MVA): On 29 April, Russell hit for the cycle against the Saraperos de Saltillo.

=== Pitchers ===
==== No-hitters ====
- Yoennis Yera (TAB): On 6 July, Yera threw a no-hitter, the second in the team's history, by defeating the Generales de Durango 2–0.

== Awards ==
LMB Awards
Award	Player	Team	Ref.
Most Valuable Player	(Cuba) Félix Pérez	Tijuana	
Manager of the Year	(Mexico) Roberto Vizcarra	Yucatán	
Pitcher of the Year	(Venezuela) Yohander Méndez	Monterrey	
Reliever of the Year	(Dominican Republic) Neftalí Feliz	Monterrey	
Defensive Player of the Year	(Mexico) Édgar Robles	Unión Laguna	
Rookie of the Year	(Mexico) Luis Márquez	Veracruz	
