= 2023 Mexican Baseball League season =

2023 Mexican League season
- League: Mexican League
- Sport: Baseball
- Duration: April 20 – September 15
- Games: 810
- Teams: 18

Serie del Rey
- Champions: Pericos de Puebla
- Runners-up: Algodoneros de Unión Laguna
- Finals MVP: Chris Carter

LMB seasons
- ← 2022 2024 →

The 2023 Mexican League season was the 98th season in the history of the Mexican League. The league is contested by 18 teams, evenly divided in North and South zones. The season started on 20 April with the series between the defending champions Leones de Yucatán and Bravos de León and ended on 15 September with the last game of the Serie del Rey, where the Pericos de Puebla defeated the Algodoneros de Unión Laguna to win the championship.

== Standings ==
North
Rank	Team	W	L	Pct.	GB	STK
1	Tecolotes de los Dos Laredos	50	36	.581	–	W6
2	Sultanes de Monterrey	50	38	.568	1.0	W1
3	Toros de Tijuana	50	40	.556	2.0	W1
4	Algodoneros de Unión Laguna	49	40	.551	2.5	L1
5	Saraperos de Saltillo	49	40	.551	2.5	W3
6	Acereros de Monclova	46	43	.517	5.5	W1
7	Generales de Durango	43	43	.500	7.0	L1
8	Mariachis de Guadalajara	42	48	.467	10.0	L1
9	Rieleros de Aguascalientes	33	55	.375	18.0	L3

South
Rank	Team	W	L	Pct.	GB	STK
1	Diablos Rojos del México	55	32	.632	—	L4
2	Olmecas de Tabasco	46	37	.554	7.0	L5
3	El Águila de Veracruz	48	40	.545	7.5	W3
4	Pericos de Puebla	46	40	.535	8.5	W2
5	Leones de Yucatán	47	43	.522	9.5	L2
6	Tigres de Quintana Roo	39	51	.433	17.5	W1
7	Guerreros de Oaxaca	34	53	.391	21.0	L1
8	Bravos de León	34	56	.378	22.5	W2
9	Piratas de Campeche	31	57	.352	24.5	L2

== Postseason ==
First round
North
Tecolotes de los Dos Laredos	4
Acereros de Monclova	0
Sultanes de Monterrey	3
Algodoneros de Unión Laguna	4
Toros de Tijuana	4
Saraperos de Saltillo	1
South
Diablos Rojos del México	4
Tigres de Quintana Roo	2
Olmecas de Tabasco	1
Leones de Yucatán	4
El Águila de Veracruz	4
Pericos de Puebla	3

Zone Series
Tecolotes de los Dos Laredos	4
Sultanes de Monterrey	2
Toros de Tijuana	1
Algodoneros de Unión Laguna	4
Diablos Rojos del México	2
Pericos de Puebla	4
Leones de Yucatán	4
El Águila de Veracruz	1

Championship Series
Tecolotes de los Dos Laredos	2
Algodoneros de Unión Laguna	4
Pericos de Puebla	4
Leones de Yucatán	1

Serie del Rey
Algodoneros de Unión Laguna	2
Pericos de Puebla	4

=== First round ===
Tecolotes de los Dos Laredos won the series, 4–0.

Game	Date	Score	Location	Time	Attendance
1	August 9	Monclova – 3, Dos Laredos – 10	Parque la Junta	2:55	4,212
2	August 10	Monclova – 6, Dos Laredos – 7	Uni-Trade Stadium	3:14	5,241
3	August 12	Dos Laredos – 7, Monclova – 4	Estadio de Béisbol Monclova	2:56	6,925
4	August 13	Dos Laredos – 6, Monclova – 4	Estadio de Béisbol Monclova	3:08	6,207

Algodoneros de Unión Laguna won the series, 4–3.

Game	Date	Score	Location	Time	Attendance
1	August 9	Laguna – 1, Monterrey – 4	Estadio Mobil Super	2:25	12,138
2	August 10	Laguna – 5, Monterrey – 7	Estadio Mobil Super	3:07	13,438
3	August 12	Monterrey – 3, Laguna – 12	Estadio Revolución	3:09	7,589
4	August 13	Monterrey – 3, Laguna – 4 (10 inn.)	Estadio Revolución	3:46	7,638
5	August 14	Monterrey – 1, Laguna – 8	Estadio Revolución	3:24	7,623
6	August 16	Laguna – 3, Monterrey – 16	Estadio Mobil Super	3:21	13,514
7	August 17	Laguna – 6, Monterrey – 4	Estadio Mobil Super	3:39	10,810

Toros de Tijuana won the series, 4–1.

Game	Date	Score	Location	Time	Attendance
1	August 9	Saltillo – 8, Tijuana – 3	Estadio Chevron	2:55	8,531
2	August 10	Saltillo – 4, Tijuana – 5	Estadio Chevron	3:02	13,896
3	August 12	Tijuana – 15, Saltillo – 12 (10 inn.)	Estadio de Béisbol Francisco I. Madero	4:23	9,168
4	August 13	Tijuana – 7, Saltillo – 6	Estadio de Béisbol Francisco I. Madero	3:33	9,619
5	August 14	Tijuana – 10, Saltillo – 9 (10 inn.)	Estadio de Béisbol Francisco I. Madero	4:09	9,822

Diablos Rojos del México won the series, 4–2.

Game	Date	Score	Location	Time	Attendance
1	August 8	Quintana Roo – 8, México – 3	Estadio Alfredo Harp Helú	3:09	14,536
2	August 9	Quintana Roo – 0, México – 11	Estadio Alfredo Harp Helú	2:59	18,005
3	August 11	México – 2, Quintana Roo – 3	Estadio de Béisbol Beto Ávila	2:50	7,214
4	August 12	México – 5, Quintana Roo – 0	Estadio de Béisbol Beto Ávila	3:10	7,862
5	August 13	México – 4, Quintana Roo – 1	Estadio de Béisbol Beto Ávila	2:51	5,716
6	August 15	Quintana Roo – 10, México – 14	Estadio Alfredo Harp Helú	3:31	20,062

Leones de Yucatán won the series, 4–1.

Game	Date	Score	Location	Time	Attendance
1	August 8	Yucatán – 7, Tabasco – 1	Estadio Centenario 27 de Febrero	3:16	7,077
2	August 9	Yucatán – 1, Tabasco – 8	Estadio Centenario 27 de Febrero	2:45	7,080
3	August 11	Tabasco – 2, Yucatán – 7	Parque Kukulcán Alamo	2:35	11,504
4	August 12	Tabasco – 7, Yucatán – 10	Parque Kukulcán Alamo	3:48	11,816
5	August 13	Tabasco – 1, Yucatán – 6	Parque Kukulcán Alamo	2:46	11,088

El Águila de Veracruz won the series, 4–3.

Game	Date	Score	Location	Time	Attendance
1	August 8	Puebla – 2, Veracruz – 0	Estadio Universitario Beto Ávila	2:26	6,150
2	August 9	Puebla – 4, Veracruz – 3 (11 inn.)	Estadio Universitario Beto Ávila	4:19	6,200
3	August 11	Veracruz – 4, Puebla – 6 (11 inn.)	Estadio de Béisbol Hermanos Serdán	3:11	6,038
4	August 12/13	Veracruz – 8, Puebla – 3	Estadio de Béisbol Hermanos Serdán	3:26	7,849
5	August 14	Veracruz – 16, Puebla – 7	Estadio de Béisbol Hermanos Serdán	3:33	4,302
6	August 16	Puebla – 2, Veracruz – 4	Estadio Universitario Beto Ávila	2:23	7,319
7	August 17	Puebla – 2, Veracruz – 4	Estadio Universitario Beto Ávila	2:57	7,319

=== Zone Series ===
Tecolotes de los Dos Laredos won the series, 4–2.

Game	Date	Score	Location	Time	Attendance
1	August 19	Monterrey – 3, Dos Laredos – 13	Uni-Trade Stadium	3:39	4,936
2	August 20	Monterrey – 6, Dos Laredos – 1	Parque la Junta	2:38	5,014
3	August 22	Dos Laredos – 9, Monterrey – 4	Estadio Mobil Super	2:57	9,466
4	August 23	Dos Laredos – 1, Monterrey – 4	Estadio Mobil Super	2:57	10,838
5	August 24	Dos Laredos – 6, Monterrey – 5	Estadio Mobil Super	3:33	14,917
6	August 26	Monterrey – 1, Dos Laredos – 6	Uni-Trade Stadium	3:15	6,307

Algodoneros de Unión Laguna won the series, 4–1.

Game	Date	Score	Location	Time	Attendance
1	August 21	Laguna – 5, Tijuana – 3	Estadio Chevron	3:35	12,680
2	August 22	Laguna – 5, Tijuana – 7	Estadio Chevron	3:15	11,996
3	August 24	Tijuana – 1, Laguna – 2	Estadio Revolución	2:29	7,640
4	August 25	Tijuana – 4, Laguna – 5	Estadio Revolución	3:07	7,638
5	August 26	Tijuana – 4, Laguna – 9	Estadio Revolución	3:15	7,635

Pericos de Puebla won the series, 4–2.

Game	Date	Score	Location	Time	Attendance
1	August 18	Puebla – 3, México – 6	Estadio Alfredo Harp Helú	3:05	14,142
2	August 19/20	Puebla – 7, México – 5	Estadio Alfredo Harp Helú	2:45	14,805
3	August 22	México – 6, Puebla – 7 (10 inn.)	Estadio de Béisbol Hermanos Serdán	4:05	7,710
4	August 23	México – 3, Puebla – 4	Estadio de Béisbol Hermanos Serdán	3:24	9,418
5	August 24	México – 8, Puebla – 6	Estadio de Béisbol Hermanos Serdán	3:42	10,708
6	August 26	Puebla – 4, México – 3	Estadio Alfredo Harp Helú	3:00	17,191

Leones de Yucatán won the series, 4–1.

Game	Date	Score	Location	Time	Attendance
1	August 18	Yucatán – 2, Veracruz – 0	Estadio Universitario Beto Ávila	3:05	6,250
2	August 19	Yucatán – 6, Veracruz – 2	Estadio Universitario Beto Ávila	3:09	6,220
3	August 21	Veracruz – 0, Yucatán – 1	Parque Kukulcán Alamo	2:26	13,152
4	August 22	Veracruz – 4, Yucatán – 2 (12 inn.)	Parque Kukulcán Alamo	4:02	14,449
5	August 23	Veracruz – 2, Yucatán – 3	Parque Kukulcán Alamo	2:41	12,905

=== Championship Series ===
Algodoneros de Unión Laguna won the series, 4–2.

Game	Date	Score	Location	Time	Attendance
1	August 29	Laguna – 5, Dos Laredos – 8	Uni-Trade Stadium	3:33	6,114
2	August 30	Laguna – 4, Dos Laredos – 2 (16 inn.)	Parque la Junta	5:17	5,739
3	September 1	Dos Laredos – 2, Laguna – 4	Estadio Revolución	2:40	7,640
4	September 2	Dos Laredos – 2, Laguna – 9	Estadio Revolución	3:04	7,640
5	September 3	Dos Laredos – 5, Laguna – 4	Estadio Revolución	3:02	7,640
6	September 5	Laguna – 3, Dos Laredos – 2	Uni-Trade Stadium	3:22	6,926

Pericos de Puebla won the series, 4–1.

Game	Date	Score	Location	Time	Attendance
1	August 28	Puebla – 3, Yucatán – 1	Parque Kukulcán Alamo	2:48	12,991
2	August 29	Puebla – 5, Yucatán – 2	Parque Kukulcán Alamo	3:03	13,658
3	August 31/September 2	Yucatán – 11, Puebla – 1	Estadio de Béisbol Hermanos Serdán	4:12	10,653
4	September 2	Yucatán – 2, Puebla – 7	Estadio de Béisbol Hermanos Serdán	2:51	9,335
5	September 3	Yucatán – 11, Puebla – 12 (12 inn.)	Estadio de Béisbol Hermanos Serdán	4:48	11,232

=== Serie del Rey ===
==== Summary ====
Pericos de Puebla won the series, 4–2.

Game	Date	Score	Location	Time	Attendance
1	8 September	Puebla – 4, Laguna – 5	Estadio Revolución	3:36	7,640
2	9 September	Puebla – 3, Laguna – 14	Estadio Revolución	3:12	7,640
3	11 September	Laguna – 2, Puebla – 8	Estadio de Béisbol Hermanos Serdán	3:35	10,217
4	12 September	Laguna – 2, Puebla – 4	Estadio de Béisbol Hermanos Serdán	2:54	10,645
5	13 September	Laguna – 5, Puebla – 6	Estadio de Béisbol Hermanos Serdán	3:36	10,653
6	15 September	Puebla – 5, Laguna – 4	Estadio Revolución	3:19	7,640

==== Game summaries ====
===== Game 1 =====
8 September 2023 8:18 p.m. (UTC–5) at Estadio Revolución in Torreón, Coahuila, 40 °C, clear
Team	1	2	3	4	5	6	7	8	9	R	H	E
Puebla	1	0	0	0	2	0	1	0	0	4	8	0
Laguna	1	0	1	0	0	0	0	0	3	5	10	1
WP: José Torres (1–0) LP: Elkin Alcalá (0–1); Home runs: PUE: Peter O'Brien (1); LAG: None; Attendance: 7,640; Boxscore

===== Game 2 =====
9 September 2023 7:00 p.m. (UTC–5) at Estadio Revolución in Torreón, Coahuila, 42 °C, clear
Team	1	2	3	4	5	6	7	8	9	R	H	E
Puebla	0	0	0	1	0	0	0	0	2	3	5	2
Laguna	2	4	6	0	2	0	0	0	X	14	16	1
WP: Joe Van Meter (1–0) LP: Yoimer Camacho (0–1); Home runs: PUE: Chris Carter (1); LAG: Nick Torres (1); Attendance: 7,640; Boxscore

===== Game 3 =====
11 September 2023 7:17 p.m. (UTC–5) at Estadio de Béisbol Hermanos Serdán in Puebla City, Puebla, 22 °C, partly cloudy
Team	1	2	3	4	5	6	7	8	9	R	H	E
Laguna	0	0	0	0	2	0	0	0	0	2	8	3
Puebla	0	3	0	2	1	0	2	0	X	8	6	0
WP: Roel Ramírez (1–0) LP: Aldo Montes (0–1); Home runs: LAG: None; PUE: Peter O'Brien (2); Attendance: 10,217; Boxscore

===== Game 4 =====
12 September 2023 7:01 p.m. (UTC–5) at Estadio de Béisbol Hermanos Serdán in Puebla City, Puebla, 22 °C, partly cloudy
Team	1	2	3	4	5	6	7	8	9	R	H	E
Laguna	0	1	1	0	0	0	0	0	0	2	7	0
Puebla	0	1	0	3	0	0	0	0	X	4	8	1
WP: Jesús Huerta (1–0) LP: Luis Gámez (0–1) Sv: Elkin Alcalá (1); Home runs: LAG: J. C. Escarra (1); PUE: Chris Carter (2); Attendance: 10,645; Boxscore

===== Game 5 =====
13 September 2023 7:02 p.m. (UTC–5) at Estadio de Béisbol Hermanos Serdán in Puebla City, Puebla, 23 °C, partly cloudy
Team	1	2	3	4	5	6	7	8	9	R	H	E
Laguna	2	1	0	0	0	0	2	0	0	5	5	0
Puebla	1	0	0	0	0	0	4	0	1	6	12	3
WP: Elkin Alcalá (1–1) LP: Thomas McIlraith (0–1); Attendance: 10,653; Boxscore

===== Game 6 =====
15 September 2023 8:00 p.m. (UTC–5) at Estadio Revolución in Torreón, Coahuila, 37 °C, clear
Team	1	2	3	4	5	6	7	8	9	R	H	E
Puebla	0	2	0	0	0	0	0	0	3	5	6	0
Laguna	0	0	0	0	0	4	0	0	0	4	7	1
WP: Erick Preciado (1–0) LP: Thomas McIlraith (0–2) Sv: Elkin Alcalá (2); Attendance: 7,640; Boxscore

== League leaders ==
Batting leaders
Stat	Player	Team	Total
AVG	(Mexico) Fernando Villegas	Saltillo	.390
HR	(United States) Kyle Martin	Oaxaca	26
RBI	(Curaçao) Ademar Rifaela	Oaxaca / Durango	83
R	(Mexico) Julián Ornelas	México	78
H	(Dominican Republic) Alejandro Mejía	León	124
SB	(Dominican Republic) Gustavo Núñez	Veracruz	36
SLG	(United States) Chris Carter	Puebla	.685

Pitching leaders
Stat	Player	Team	Total
ERA	(Mexico) Braulio Torres-Pérez	Tabasco	2.41
W	(United States) Brandon Brennan	Dos Laredos	11
W	(Venezuela) Yoimer Camacho	Puebla	11
SV	(United States) Kurt Heyer	Saltillo	20
SV	(Mexico) Fernando Salas	Tabasco	20
IP	(United States) Braden Webb	Unión Laguna	108.1
K	(Mexico) Darel Torres	Quintana Roo	100
WHIP	(Dominican Republic) Gabriel Ynoa	Puebla	1.14

== Milestones ==
=== Batters ===
- Cristhian Adames (PUE): On 25 July, Adames hit for the cycle against the Guerreros de Oaxaca, becoming the first player in franchise history to accomplish the feat.

=== Pitchers ===
==== No-hitters ====
- Yoimer Camacho (PUE): On 3 June, Camacho threw a no-hitter against the Guerreros de Oaxaca in a game that was called after six innings due to inclement weather. It was the fifth no-hitter in franchise history.
- Jovany López (CAM): On 24 June, López threw a no-hitter against the Olmecas de Tabasco in a game that was called after five innings due to inclement weather.
- David Reyes (VER): On 11 July, Reyes threw a no-hitter, the seventh in the team's history, by defeating the Saraperos de Saltillo 2–0.

== Awards ==
LMB Awards
Award	Player	Team	Ref.
Most Valuable Player	(Mexico) Fernando Villegas	Saraperos de Saltillo	
Rookie of the Year	(Mexico) Randy Romero	Mariachis de Guadalajara	
Pitcher of the Year	(United States) Braulio Torres-Pérez	Olmecas de Tabasco	
Reliever of the Year	(Mexico) Fernando Salas	Olmecas de Tabasco	
Manager of the Year	(Dominican Republic) Félix Fermín	Tecolotes de los Dos Laredos	
