= List of Mexican League stadiums =

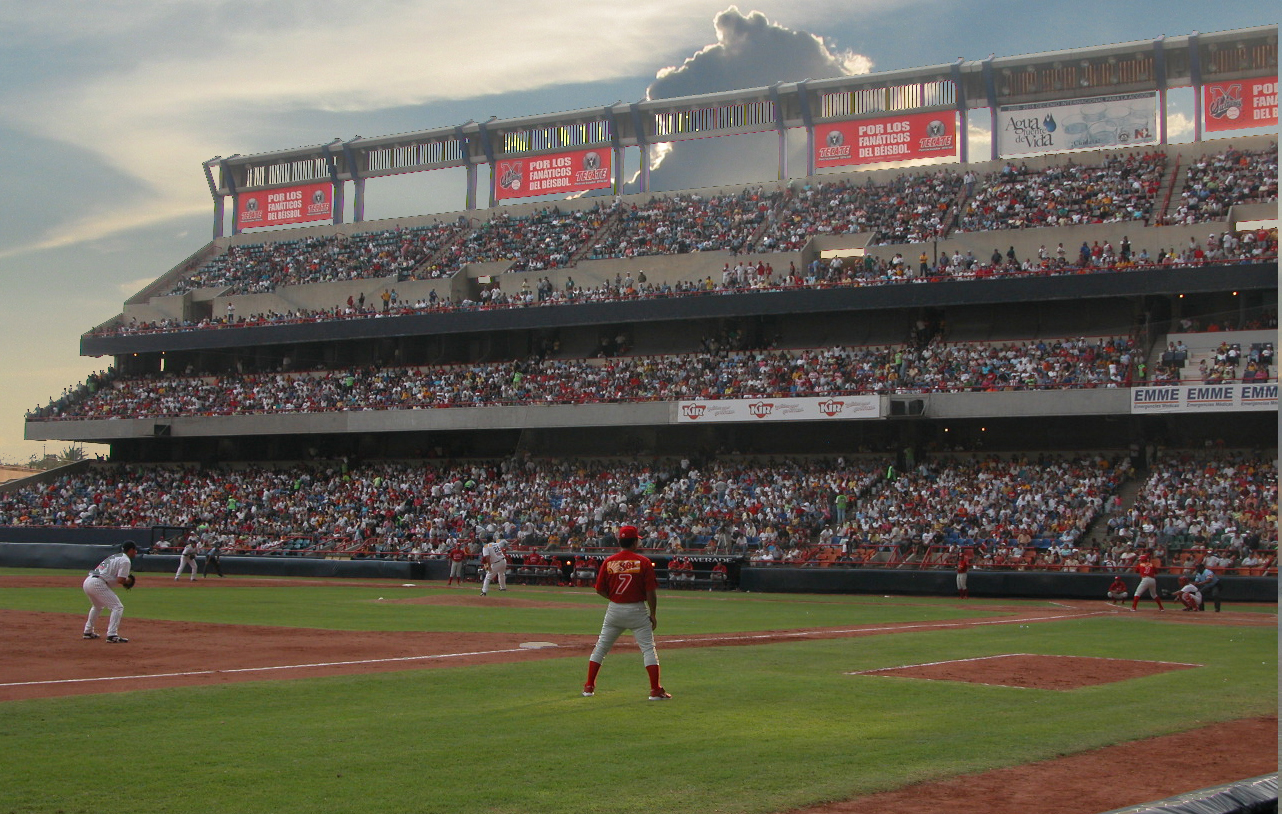
Estadio de Béisbol Monterrey, home of the Sultanes de Monterrey, has the largest seating capacity (27,000) in the league.

The following is a list of current Mexican League stadiums. There are 17 stadiums in use. The oldest stadium is Estadio Revolución, home of the Algodoneros de Unión Laguna, which opened in 1932. The newest stadium is Estadio Alfredo Harp Helú, home of the Diablos Rojos del México, which opened in 2019. All but one stadium (Estadio Eduardo Vasconcelos) uses a natural grass playing surface. One stadium was built in the 1930s, two in the 1940s, one in the 1950s, two in the 1960s, six in the 1970s, one in the 1980s, one in the 1990s, one in the 2000s, and two in the 2010s. The highest seating capacity of all active stadiums is 27,000, at Estadio de Béisbol Monterrey where the Sultanes de Monterrey play. The lowest capacities are at the Piratas de Campeche's Estadio Nelson Barrera and the Tecolotes de los Dos Laredos' Parque la Junta and Uni-Trade Stadium, which all hold 6,000.

== Current ballparks ==
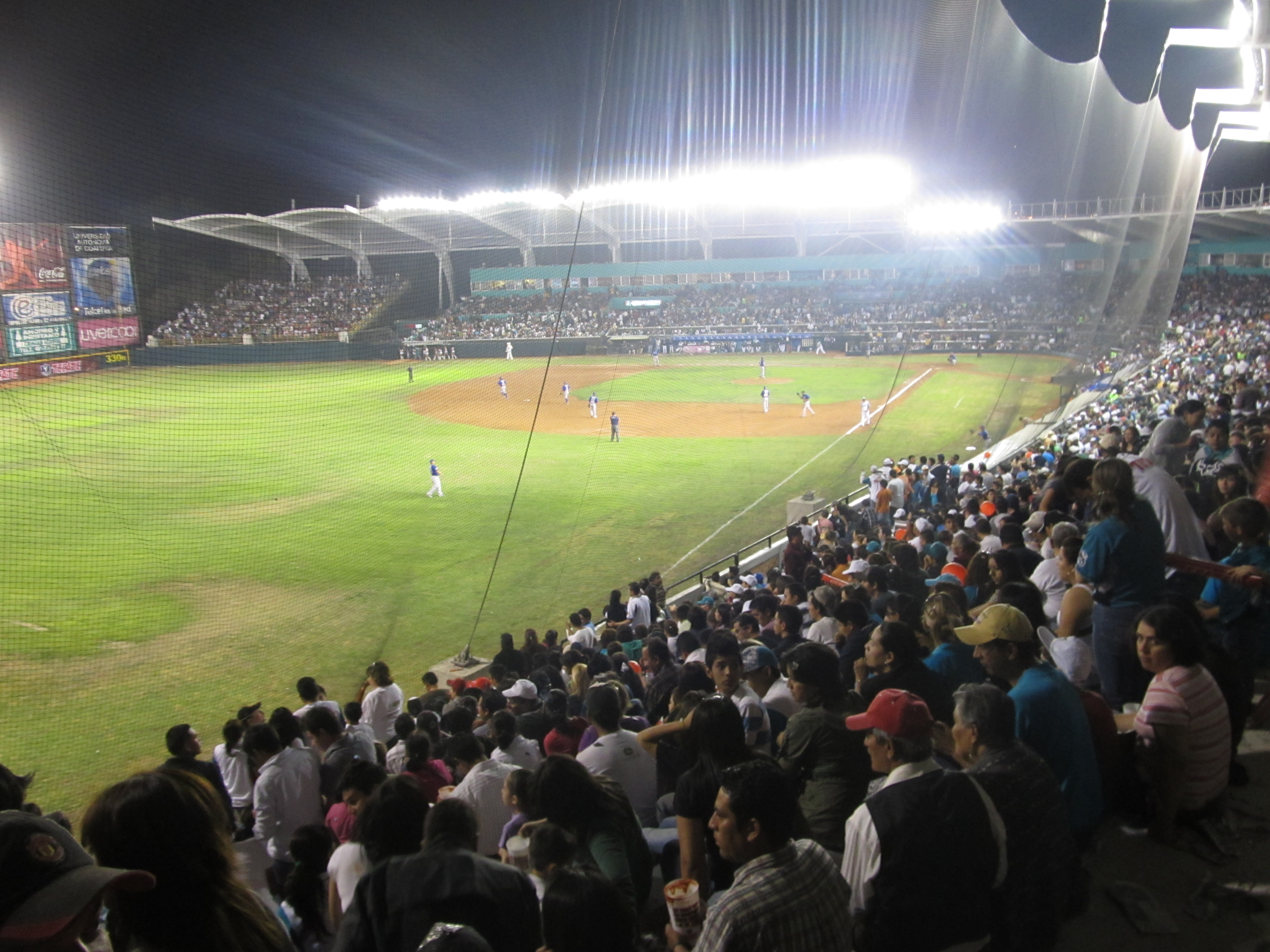
Estadio de Béisbol Francisco I. Madero, home of the Saraperos de Saltillo

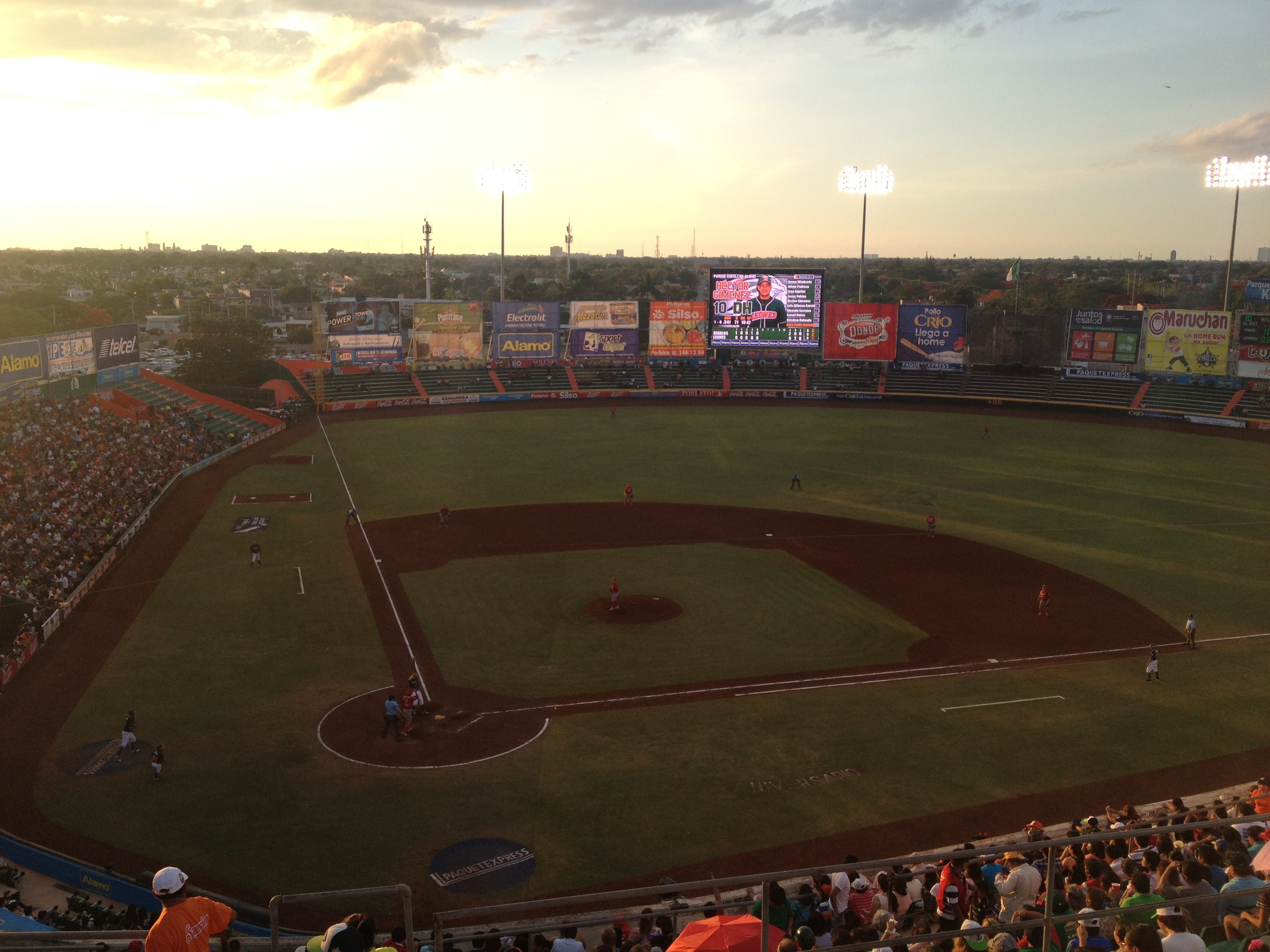
Parque Kukulcán Alamo, home of the Leones de Yucatán

Stadium name	Team	City	State	Opened	Capacity	Surface	Ref
Estadio Centenario 27 de Febrero	Olmecas de Tabasco	Villahermosa	Tabasco	1964	8,500	Grass	
Estadio de Béisbol Alberto Romo Chávez	Rieleros de Aguascalientes	Aguascalientes	Aguascalientes	1946	9,000	Grass	
Estadio de Béisbol Francisco I. Madero	Saraperos de Saltillo	Saltillo	Coahuila	1964	16,000	Grass	
Estadio de Béisbol Hermanos Serdán	Pericos de Puebla	Puebla	Puebla	1973	12,100	Grass	
Estadio de Béisbol Monclova	Acereros de Monclova	Monclova	Coahuila	1975	8,500	Grass	
Estadio de Béisbol Monterrey	Sultanes de Monterrey	Monterrey	Nuevo León	1990	27,000	Grass	
Estadio Chevron	Toros de Tijuana	Tijuana	Baja California	1977	16,811	Grass	
Estadio Domingo Santana	Bravos de León	León	Guanajuato	1973	8,500	Grass	
Estadio Eduardo Vasconcelos	Guerreros de Oaxaca	Oaxaca	Oaxaca	1950	7,200	FieldTurf	
Estadio Francisco Villa	Generales de Durango	Durango	Durango	1972	9,000	Grass	
Estadio Nelson Barrera	Piratas de Campeche	Campeche	Campeche	2001	6,000	Grass	
Estadio Revolución	Algodoneros de Unión Laguna	Torreón	Coahuila	1932	7,689	Grass	
Estadio Universitario Beto Ávila	Rojos del Águila de Veracruz	Veracruz	Veracruz	1992	7,782	Grass	
Estadio Alfredo Harp Helú	Diablos Rojos del México	Mexico City	Mexico City	2019	20,000	Grass	
Parque la Junta	Tecolotes de los Dos Laredos^{[a]}	Nuevo Laredo	Tamaulipas	1947	6,000	Grass	
Parque Kukulcán Alamo	Leones de Yucatán	Mérida	Yucatán	1982	16,000	Grass	
Uni-Trade Stadium	Tecolotes de los Dos Laredos^{[a]}	Laredo	Texas	2012	6,000	Grass	
Beto Avila Stadium	Tigres de Quintana Roo	Cancun	Quintana Roo	1955	9,500	Grass	

- ^{a} The Tecolotes de los Dos Laredos play half of their home games at Parque la Junta in Nuevo Laredo, Tamaulipas, Mexico, and the other half at Uni-Trade Stadium in Laredo, Texas, United States.

=== Map ===
Current stadium locations:
North Division
South Division

== See also ==
- List of International League stadiums
- List of Pacific Coast League stadiums
- List of Triple-A baseball stadiums
