= 2024 Mexican Baseball League season =

2024 Mexican League season
- League: Mexican League
- Sport: Baseball
- Duration: 11 April – 9 September
- Games: 930
- Teams: 20

Serie del Rey
- Champions: Diablos Rojos del México
- Runners-up: Sultanes de Monterrey
- Finals MVP: José Marmolejos

LMB seasons
- ← 2023 2025 →

The 2024 Mexican League season was the 99th season in the history of the baseball Mexican League (LMB). The league is contested by 20 teams, evenly divided in North and South zones. The season started on 11 April with the series between the defending champions Pericos de Puebla and Diablos Rojos del México and ended on 9 September with the last game of the Serie del Rey, where the Diablos Rojos del México defeated the Sultanes de Monterrey to win the championship.

== Team changes ==
The number of teams increased from eighteen in 2023 to twenty in 2024 (the last time that twenty teams contested the league was in 1979) with four new franchises joining the LMB for this season.

Dorados de Chihuahua and Conspiradores de Querétaro joined the league as expansion teams. The Dorados first played in the Mexican League in 1940 and had since played in the league in several stints, the most recent being from 2007 to 2010, while the Conspiradores were established in 2023, bringing professional baseball to Querétaro for the first time.

Charros de Jalisco returned to the LMB after purchasing the Mariachis de Guadalajara; Charros last played in the Mexican League in 1995 and joined the Mexican Pacific League in 2014. Caliente de Durango, owned by Grupo Caliente, replaced Generales de Durango after the league suspended the Generales due to its owner's legal problems.

== Standings ==
North
Rank	Team	W	L	Pct.	GB	STK
1	Sultanes de Monterrey	53	37	.589	–	L2
2	Tecolotes de los Dos Laredos	54	39	.581	0.5	W2
3	Algodoneros de Unión Laguna	52	39	.571	1.5	W2
4	Toros de Tijuana	52	40	.565	2.0	W6
5	Acereros de Monclova	51	40	.560	2.5	L2
6	Rieleros de Aguascalientes	48	43	.527	5.5	W2
7	Saraperos de Saltillo	44	48	.478	10.0	L2
8	Caliente de Durango	37	55	.402	17.0	W2
9	Charros de Jalisco	36	56	.391	18.0	L2
10	Dorados de Chihuahua	33	60	.355	21.5	L3

South
Rank	Team	W	L	Pct.	GB	STK
1	Diablos Rojos del México	71	19	.789	—	W3
2	Conspiradores de Querétaro	50	38	.568	20.0	W2
3	Leones de Yucatán	45	40	.529	23.5	L3
4	El Águila de Veracruz	46	44	.511	25.0	L2
5	Guerreros de Oaxaca	46	44	.511	25.0	L1
6	Pericos de Puebla	45	44	.506	25.5	W1
7	Olmecas de Tabasco	47	46	.505	25.5	W2
8	Bravos de León	37	53	.411	34.0	L1
9	Piratas de Campeche	32	55	.368	37.5	L2
10	Tigres de Quintana Roo	25	64	.281	45.5	W1

== Postseason ==
First round
North
Sultanes de Monterrey	4
Rieleros de Aguascalientes	1
Tecolotes de los Dos Laredos	4
Acereros de Monclova	2
Algodoneros de Unión Laguna	4
Toros de Tijuana	1
South
Diablos Rojos del México	4
Pericos de Puebla	1
Conspiradores de Querétaro	4
El Águila de Veracruz	1
Leones de Yucatán	3
Guerreros de Oaxaca	4

Zone Series
Sultanes de Monterrey	4
Acereros de Monclova	3
Tecolotes de los Dos Laredos	4
Algodoneros de Unión Laguna	1
Diablos Rojos del México	4
Leones de Yucatán	0
Conspiradores de Querétaro	0
Guerreros de Oaxaca	4

Championship Series
Sultanes de Monterrey	4
Tecolotes de los Dos Laredos	2
Diablos Rojos del México	4
Guerreros de Oaxaca	3

Serie del Rey
Sultanes de Monterrey	0
Diablos Rojos del México	4

=== First round ===
Sultanes de Monterrey won the series, 4–1.

Game	Date	Score	Location	Time	Attendance
1	August 3	Aguascalientes – 1, Monterrey – 3	Estadio Mobil Super	2:49	7,063
2	August 4	Aguascalientes – 6, Monterrey – 12	Estadio Mobil Super	3:44	7,539
3	August 6	Monterrey – 12, Aguascalientes – 6	Estadio Alberto Romo Chávez	3:32	5,128
4	August 7	Monterrey – 0, Aguascalientes – 8	Estadio Alberto Romo Chávez	2:47	5,273
5	August 8	Monterrey – 11, Aguascalientes – 4	Estadio Alberto Romo Chávez	3:13	4,267

Tecolotes de los Dos Laredos won the series, 4–2.

Game	Date	Score	Location	Time	Attendance
1	August 3	Monclova – 3, Dos Laredos – 4	Uni-Trade Stadium	2:35	3,318
2	August 4	Monclova – 4, Dos Laredos – 5	Parque la Junta	3:03	4,031
3	August 6	Dos Laredos – 3, Monclova – 6	Estadio Kickapoo Lucky Eagle	3:05	7,250
4	August 7	Dos Laredos – 1, Monclova – 8	Estadio Kickapoo Lucky Eagle	2:57	6,951
5	August 8	Dos Laredos – 5, Monclova – 4	Estadio Kickapoo Lucky Eagle	3:10	7,381
6	August 10	Monclova – 5, Dos Laredos – 6 (10 inn.)	Uni-Trade Stadium	3:54	3,641

Algodoneros de Unión Laguna won the series, 4–1.

Game	Date	Score	Location	Time	Attendance
1	August 3	Tijuana – 4, Laguna – 5 (11 inn.)	Estadio Revolución	3:50	7,624
2	August 4	Tijuana – 4, Laguna – 0	Estadio Revolución	2:47	7,640
3	August 6	Laguna – 2, Tijuana – 1	Estadio Chevron	2:59	7,896
4	August 7	Laguna – 2, Tijuana – 1	Estadio Chevron	3:19	8,997
5	August 8	Laguna – 6, Tijuana – 2	Estadio Chevron	3:16	9,789

Diablos Rojos del México won the series, 4–1.

Game	Date	Score	Location	Time	Attendance
1	August 4	Puebla – 0, México – 5	Estadio Alfredo Harp Helú	2:33	16,059
2	August 5/6	Puebla – 2, México – 3	Estadio Alfredo Harp Helú	2:46	12,895
3	August 8	México – 7, Puebla – 2	Estadio de Béisbol Hermanos Serdán	2:55	8,776
4	August 9	México – 4, Puebla – 6	Estadio de Béisbol Hermanos Serdán	2:49	8,503
5	August 10	México – 7, Puebla – 3	Estadio de Béisbol Hermanos Serdán	3:21	6,246

Conspiradores de Querétaro won the series, 4–1.

Game	Date	Score	Location	Time	Attendance
1	August 4	Veracruz – 9, Querétaro – 12	Estadio Finsus	3:46	4,621
2	August 5	Veracruz – 1, Querétaro – 9	Estadio Finsus	3:04	3,718
3	August 7	Querétaro – 3, Veracruz – 4	Estadio Universitario Beto Ávila	3:11	5,430
4	August 8	Querétaro – 4, Veracruz – 1	Estadio Universitario Beto Ávila	2:57	5,680
5	August 9	Querétaro – 4, Veracruz – 2	Estadio Universitario Beto Ávila	3:20	6,220

Guerreros de Oaxaca won the series, 4–3.

Game	Date	Score	Location	Time	Attendance
1	August 4	Oaxaca – 5, Yucatán – 7	Estadio Víctor Cervera Pacheco	3:15	3,766
2	August 5	Oaxaca – 9, Yucatán – 2	Estadio Víctor Cervera Pacheco	3:20	4,841
3	August 7	Yucatán – 22, Oaxaca – 12	Estadio Eduardo Vasconcelos	4:36	4,742
4	August 8	Yucatán – 4, Oaxaca – 11	Estadio Eduardo Vasconcelos	3:29	3,841
5	August 9	Yucatán – 6, Oaxaca – 9	Estadio Eduardo Vasconcelos	3:39	4,028
6	August 12	Oaxaca – 0, Yucatán – 3	Estadio Víctor Cervera Pacheco	2:19	3,695
7	August 13	Oaxaca – 3, Yucatán – 0	Estadio Víctor Cervera Pacheco	2:54	2,009

=== Zone Series ===
Sultanes de Monterrey won the series, 4–3.

Game	Date	Score	Location	Time	Attendance
1	August 13	Monclova – 4, Monterrey – 2	Estadio Mobil Super	2:56	9,686
2	August 14	Monclova – 2, Monterrey – 8	Estadio Mobil Super	3:16	17,206
3	August 16	Monterrey – 0, Monclova – 3	Estadio Kickapoo Lucky Eagle	2:56	8,500
4	August 17	Monterrey – 2, Monclova – 1	Estadio Kickapoo Lucky Eagle	3:03	8,500
5	August 18	Monterrey – 4, Monclova – 3	Estadio Kickapoo Lucky Eagle	3:03	8,217
6	August 20	Monclova – 4, Monterrey – 2	Estadio Mobil Super	3:12	15,685
7	August 21	Monclova – 3, Monterrey – 11	Estadio Mobil Super	3:16	12,986

Tecolotes de los Dos Laredos won the series, 4–1.

Game	Date	Score	Location	Time	Attendance
1	August 13	Laguna – 1, Dos Laredos – 3	Uni-Trade Stadium	2:55	3,617
2	August 14	Laguna – 0, Dos Laredos – 2	Parque la Junta	1:49	3,955
3	August 16	Dos Laredos – 1, Laguna – 17	Estadio Revolución	2:50	7,640
4	August 17	Dos Laredos – 9, Laguna – 0	Estadio Revolución	2:50	7,638
5	August 18	Dos Laredos – 6, Laguna – 2	Estadio Revolución	3:09	7,319

Diablos Rojos del México won the series, 4–0.

Game	Date	Score	Location	Time	Attendance
1	August 15	Yucatán – 2, México – 6	Estadio Alfredo Harp Helú	3:04	11,521
2	August 16/17	Yucatán – 6, México – 8	Estadio Alfredo Harp Helú	3:40	14,832
3	August 19	México – 5, Yucatán – 2	Estadio Víctor Cervera Pacheco	2:45	5,043
4	August 21	México – 4, Yucatán – 1	Estadio Víctor Cervera Pacheco	2:50	3,958

Guerreros de Oaxaca won the series, 4–0.

Game	Date	Score	Location	Time	Attendance
1	August 15	Oaxaca – 9, Querétaro – 8	Estadio Finsus	3:57	3,622
2	August 16/17	Oaxaca – 9, Querétaro – 2	Estadio Finsus	3:45	3,831
3	August 19	Querétaro – 4, Oaxaca – 13	Estadio Eduardo Vasconcelos	3:10	5,169
4	August 20	Querétaro – 6, Oaxaca – 7	Estadio Eduardo Vasconcelos	4:15	5,276

=== Championship Series ===
Sultanes de Monterrey won the series, 4–2.

Game	Date	Score	Location	Time	Attendance
1	August 23	Dos Laredos – 5, Monterrey – 9	Estadio Mobil Super	3:08	13,254
2	August 24	Dos Laredos – 6, Monterrey – 7	Estadio Mobil Super	3:35	15,702
3	August 26	Monterrey – 0, Dos Laredos – 5	Parque la Junta	2:23	5,060
4	August 27	Monterrey – 4, Dos Laredos – 2	Uni-Trade Stadium	2:57	6,021
5	August 28	Monterrey – 1, Dos Laredos – 6	Uni-Trade Stadium	2:56	4,620
6	August 31	Dos Laredos – 7, Monterrey – 8	Estadio Mobil Super	3:42	18,353

Diablos Rojos del México won the series, 4–3.

Game	Date	Score	Location	Time	Attendance
1	August 24	Oaxaca – 5, México – 4	Estadio Alfredo Harp Helú	3:26	17,645
2	August 25	Oaxaca – 9, México – 4	Estadio Alfredo Harp Helú	3:31	18,073
3	August 27	México – 11, Oaxaca – 12	Estadio Eduardo Vasconcelos	3:43	6,033
4	August 28	México – 16, Oaxaca – 5	Estadio Eduardo Vasconcelos	4:31	6,025
5	August 29	México – 9, Oaxaca – 1	Estadio Eduardo Vasconcelos	2:54	6,000
6	August 31	Oaxaca – 10, México – 11	Estadio Alfredo Harp Helú	4:10	20,065
7	September 1	Oaxaca – 2, México – 3	Estadio Alfredo Harp Helú	3:15	20,071

=== Serie del Rey ===
==== Summary ====
Diablos Rojos del México won the series, 4–0.

Game	Date	Score	Location	Time	Attendance
1	September 4	Monterrey – 6, México – 14	Estadio Alfredo Harp Helú	3:28	20,088
2	September 5	Monterrey – 0, México – 17	Estadio Alfredo Harp Helú	3:20	20,177
3	September 7/8	México – 2, Monterrey – 0	Estadio Mobil Super	2:21	21,909
4	September 9	México – 4, Monterrey – 2	Estadio Mobil Super	2:42	16,086

==== Game summaries ====
===== Game 1 =====
4 September 2024 7:06 p.m. (UTC–6) at Estadio Alfredo Harp Helú in Iztacalco, Mexico City, 24 °C, cloudy
Team	1	2	3	4	5	6	7	8	9	R	H	E
Monterrey	1	0	1	2	0	2	0	0	0	6	14	3
México	0	2	0	0	5	3	0	4	x	14	14	0
WP: Conner Menez (1–0) LP: Julio Teherán (0–1); Home runs: MTY: None; MEX: Juan Carlos Gamboa (1), Patrick Mazeika (1); Attendance: 20,088; Boxscore

===== Game 2 =====
5 September 2024 7:03 p.m. (UTC–6) at Estadio Alfredo Harp Helú in Iztacalco, Mexico City 20 °C, rain
Team	1	2	3	4	5	6	7	8	9	R	H	E
Monterrey	0	0	0	0	0	0	0	0	0	0	3	1
México	0	4	0	0	8	2	3	0	x	17	18	0
WP: Erick Leal (1–0) LP: Tyler Viza (0–1); Home runs: MTY: None; MEX: Julián Ornelas (1), Aristides Aquino (1), Robinson Canó (1); Attendance: 20,177; Boxscore

===== Game 3 =====
7 September 2024 5:07 p.m. (UTC–6) at Estadio Mobil Super in Monterrey, Nuevo León 31 °C, partly cloudy
Team	1	2	3	4	5	6	7	8	9	R	H	E
México	0	0	0	0	1	0	0	0	1	2	5	0
Monterrey	0	0	0	0	0	0	0	0	0	0	5	1
WP: Trevor Bauer (1–0) LP: Stephen Tarpley (0–1); Home runs: MEX: José Pirela (1); MTY: None; Attendance: 21,909; Boxscore

===== Game 4 =====
9 September 2024 7:31 p.m. (UTC–6) at Estadio Mobil Super in Monterrey, Nuevo León 28 °C, cloudy
Team	1	2	3	4	5	6	7	8	9	R	H	E
México	4	0	0	0	0	0	0	0	0	4	8	1
Monterrey	0	0	0	0	0	0	0	0	2	2	5	0
WP: Brooks Hall (1–0) LP: Julio Teherán (0–2); Home runs: MEX: José Marmolejos (1); MTY: None; Attendance: 16,086; Boxscore

== League leaders ==
Batting leaders
Stat	Player	Team	Total
AVG	(Dominican Republic) Robinson Canó	México	.431
HR	(United States) Art Charles	Yucatán	33
RBI	(Mexico) Julián Ornelas	México	84
R	(Cuba) Yurisbel Gracial	Querétaro	95
H	(Dominican Republic) Robinson Canó	México	141
SB	(United States) Billy Hamilton	Jalisco	37

Pitching leaders
Stat	Player	Team	Total
W	(United States) Trevor Bauer	México	10
W	(Mexico) Juan Pablo Oramas	Tabasco	10
W	(Dominican Republic) César Valdez	Yucatán	10
ERA	(United States) Zac Grotz	Monclova	2.35
K	(United States) Trevor Bauer	México	120
IP	(Mexico) David Reyes	Veracruz	123.0
SV	(Mexico) Fernando Salas	Tabasco	28

== Milestones ==
=== Batters ===
- Charros de Jalisco: On 2 June, the Charros set an LMB record by hitting five back-to-back home runs in a game against the Tigres de Quintana Roo. Luis Sardiñas, Vimael Machín, Anthony Giansanti, Greg Bird, and Oswaldo Arcia homered consecutively against two Quintana Roo pitchers.
- José Marmolejos (MEX): On 9 July, Marmolejos hit two home runs in one inning, becoming the fourth player in Diablos history to achieve the feat, and the 25th overall in LMB history.

=== Pitchers ===
==== No-hitters ====
- Kevin Kelly (MTY): On 31 May, in the second game of a scheduled doubleheader that was limited to seven innings, Kelly threw a no-hitter against the Pericos de Puebla. It was the fifth no-hitter in franchise history.

==== Strikeouts in a game ====
- Trevor Bauer (MEX): On 21 June, Bauer broke the LMB record for strikeouts in a game, fanning 19 batters in a 6–1 win over the Guerreros de Oaxaca.

== Awards ==
Award	Player	Team	Ref.
Most Valuable Player	(Dominican Republic) Robinson Canó	Diablos Rojos del México	
Rookie of the Year	(Mexico) Denny Román	Sultanes de Monterrey	
Pitcher of the Year	(United States) Trevor Bauer	Diablos Rojos del México	
Reliever of the Year	(Mexico) Fernando Salas	Olmecas de Tabasco	
Defensive Player of the Year	(Venezuela) Franklin Barreto	Diablos Rojos del México	
Manager of the Year	(Dominican Republic) José Offerman	Conspiradores de Querétaro	
