= Estadio Sostenible de Yucatán =

Unbuilt sports stadium in Yucatan, Mexico

- Location: Mérida, Yucatán
- Operator: Government of the State of Yucatán
- Capacity: Concerts: 32,000; Association football: 27,000; Baseball: 23,000

Construction
- Opened: Cancelled
- Architects: Juego de Pelota, Inc.

Tenants
- Venados (Liga de Expansión MX); Leones de Yucatán (LMB)

Estadio Sostenible de Yucatán was supposed to be a multi-purpose stadium in Mérida, Yucatán, a new home of the football club Venados of the Liga de Expansión MX and baseball club Leones de Yucatán of the Liga Mexicana de Béisbol. It would have served as the replacement of their current homes, Estadio Carlos Iturralde and Parque Kukulcán Alamo. It would have held 23,000 for baseball, 27,000 for football and 32,000 for concerts.

As of September 2022 no construction works had commenced. It was announced in December 2022, that the land will be sold to the Government of Mexico for other projects.
