= Estadio Monterrey =

Estadio Monterrey may refer to:

- Estadio BBVA, a soccer stadium in Guadalupe, Nuevo León, Mexico
- Estadio de Béisbol Monterrey, a baseball stadium in Monterrey, Mexico
