= José Torres (pitcher) =

Venezuelan baseball player (born 1993)

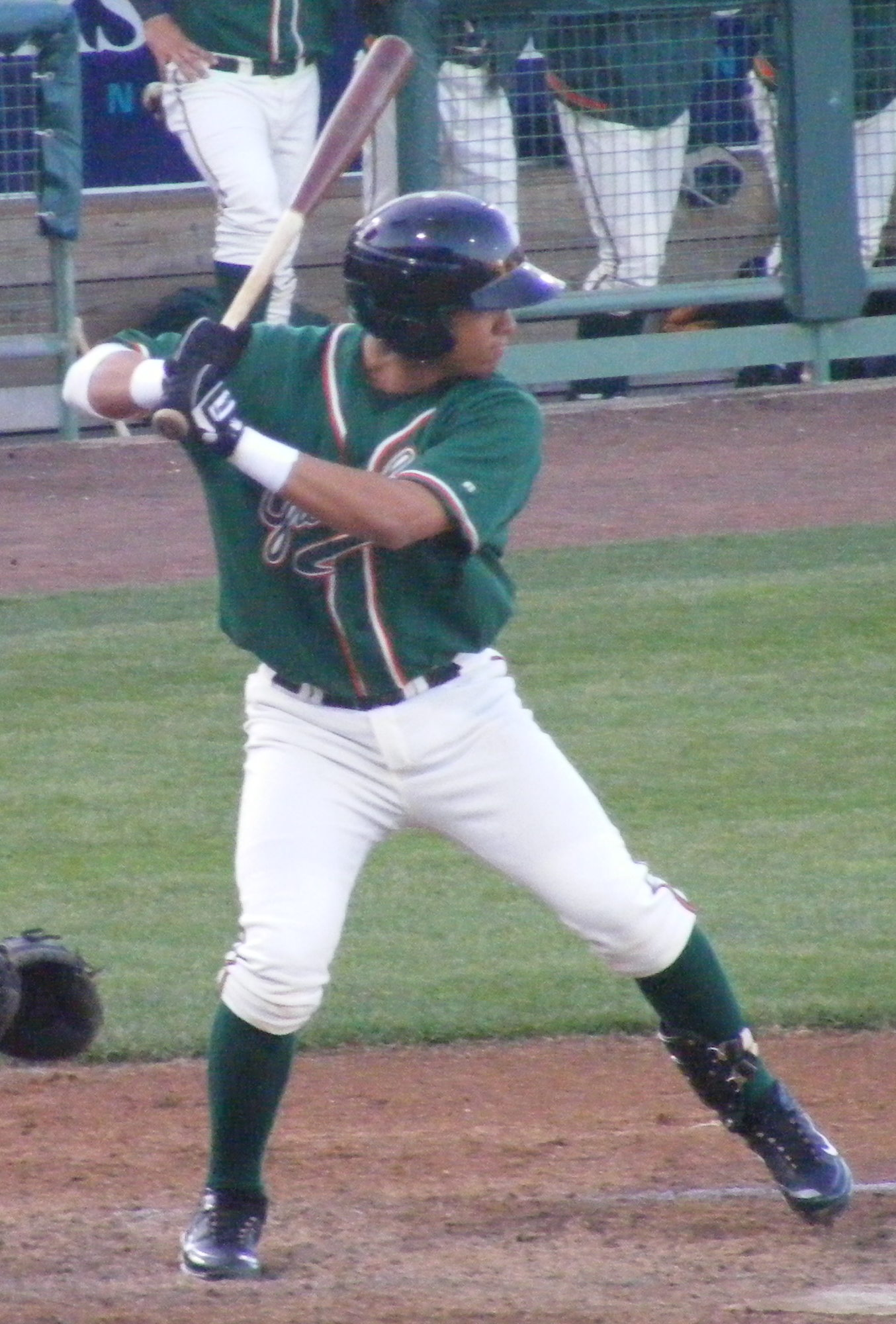
- Torres with the Greensboro Grasshoppers in 2010

Algodoneros de Unión Laguna – No. 76
- Pitcher
- Born: September 24, 1993 (age 32); Caracas, Venezuela
- Bats: Left Throws: Left

MLB debut
- September 22, 2016, for the San Diego Padres

MLB statistics (through 2017 season)
- Win–loss record: 7–4
- Earned run average: 4.04
- Strikeouts: 66
- Stats at Baseball Reference

Teams
- San Diego Padres (2016–2017)

José Marcos Torres (born September 24, 1993) is a Venezuelan professional baseball pitcher for the Algodoneros de Unión Laguna of the Mexican League. He has previously played in Major League Baseball (MLB) for the San Diego Padres.

== Career ==
=== Oakland Athletics ===
Torres signed as an international free agent with the Oakland Athletics in July 2010. The Athletics began using him exclusively as a relief pitcher during the 2015 season, and he had a 2.56 earned run average in 77 1/3 innings pitched mostly for the Beloit Snappers of the Single–A Midwest League, while also making three appearances for the Stockton Ports of the High–A California League.

After the 2015 season, the Athletics added Torres to their 40-man roster to protect him from being eligible to be selected in the Rule 5 draft on November 20.

=== San Diego Padres ===
The Athletics then traded Torres, Drew Pomeranz, and a player to be named later or cash considerations to the San Diego Padres for Marc Rzepczynski and Yonder Alonso on December 2.

Following the 2016 minor league season, the Padres promoted Torres to the major leagues on September 21. He pitched three innings for the Padres and was then assigned to the Peoria Javelinas of the Arizona Fall League.

Torres made the Padres' Opening Day roster in 2017. He was 7–4 with a 4.21 ERA and shared the major league lead in balks, with three.

He was placed on the MLB restricted list by the Padres in February 2018 as a result of an arrest for a domestic violence incident. On June 8, he was suspended for the remainder of the season without pay for violating MLB's personal conduct policy. On October 4, he was designated for assignment after the season was over, and on October 10, he was released after clearing outright waivers.

=== Tecolotes de los Dos Laredos ===
On May 20, 2021, Torres signed with the Tecolotes de los Dos Laredos of the Mexican League. In 24 games for the team, he posted a 5–1 record and 0.89 ERA with 45 strikeouts and 4 saves across 40 2/3 innings pitched.

Torres made 38 appearances for the Tecolotes in 2022, recording a 3.54 ERA with 47 strikeouts and 11 saves over 40 2/3 innings of relief. He was released by the team on August 1, 2022.

=== Algodoneros de Unión Laguna ===
On January 10, 2023, Torres was traded to the Algodoneros de Unión Laguna of the Mexican League in exchange for Jordan Guerrero. In 43 games for Laguna, he posted a 3–3 record and 5.07 ERA with 60 strikeouts and 4 saves across 49 2/3 innings pitched.

Torres made 51 appearances for the Algodoneros in 2024 his second season with the team, compiling a 4–0 record and 3.63 ERA with 44 strikeouts across 44 2/3 innings of relief.

In 2025, Torres returned for a third season with Laguna. In 24 games (2 starts) he threw 22.2 innings going 0–1 with a 4.76 ERA and 24 strikeouts.

== Legal issues ==
Torres was arrested in December 2017 and charged with assault with a deadly weapon, criminal damage, and intimidation as a result of a domestic dispute in Phoenix, Arizona.

== See also ==
- List of Major League Baseball players from Venezuela
