= Erick Leal =

Venezuelan baseball player (born 1995)

Free agent
- Pitcher
- Born: March 17, 1995 (age 31); Valencia, Venezuela
- Bats: Right Throws: Right

Erick Alejandro Leal (born March 17, 1995) is a Venezuelan professional baseball pitcher who is a free agent. He was selected to the Venezuela national baseball team at the 2023 World Baseball Classic.

== Professional career ==
=== Arizona Diamondbacks ===
On September 14, 2011, Leal signed with the Arizona Diamondbacks organization as an international free agent. He made his professional debut with the Dominican Summer League Diamondbacks, working to a 2.44 earned run average (ERA) in 2012.

=== Chicago Cubs ===
On February 18, 2013, Leal and Jesús Castillo were traded to the Chicago Cubs in exchange for Tony Campana. In 2013, he played for the Arizona League Cubs, working to a 2.77 ERA and 52 strikeouts over 13 games. Promoted to the Low-A Boise Hawks the next year, Leal posted a 3.73 ERA and 31 strikeouts in 13 games. In 2015, he was promoted again to the Single-A South Bend Cubs, registering a 10-8 record and 3.85 ERA with 86 strikeouts across 128 2/3 innings pitched. In 2016, Leal played with the AZL Cubs and High-A Myrtle Beach Pelicans, compiling an 11-4 record and 3.13 ERA with 71 strikeouts over 97 2/3 innings of work.

Leal underwent Tommy John surgery after the 2016 season, missing all of the 2017 and the first month of the 2018 season. He returned to High-A Myrtle Beach, posting a 1.41 ERA and 61 strikeouts over 21 games. Leal split 2019 between Myrtle Beach and the Double-A Tennessee Smokies, where he posted a combined 4-6 record and 5.21 ERA with 87 strikeouts in 17 games (16 starts). Leal elected free agency following the season on November 4, 2019.

=== Rieleros de Aguascalientes ===
On February 25, 2021, Leal signed with the Rieleros de Aguascalientes of the Mexican League. Over 54 2/3 innings pitched in 12 games, he logged a 3-3 record and 5.93 ERA with 66 strikeouts. Leal returned to the Rieleros the following year, recording an improved 3.50 ERA with 100 strikeouts in 90 innings pitched across 17 starts, being named a North Division All-Star.

In 2023, Leal regressed slightly, posting a 2-3 record and 4.56 ERA with 49 strikeouts in 47 1/3 innings pitched across 10 starts.

=== Diablos Rojos del México ===
On August 1, 2023, Leal was traded to Diablos Rojos del México. He played only a single game with Diablos in 2023, allowing five earned runs in four innings. Leal's 2024 season was a return to form, as he posted an 8-1 record and 2.91 ERA with 95 strikeouts across 80 1/3 innings pitched.

=== New York Yankees ===
On September 15, 2024, Leal signed a two-year minor league contract with the New York Yankees. He made 28 appearances (26 starts) for the Triple-A Scranton/Wilkes-Barre RailRiders in 2025, compiling an 8-10 record and 5.61 ERA with 133 strikeouts across 126 1/3 innings pitched. Leal elected free agency following the season on November 6, 2025.

=== Fubon Guardians ===
On December 31, 2025, Leal signed with the Fubon Guardians of the Chinese Professional Baseball League. He did not appear for the main club, recording a 3.19 ERA and 1.32 WHIP across 42 1/3 innings pitched for Fubon's farm team. Leal was released by the Guardians on June 25, 2026, following the signing of Quinton Martinez.

== International career ==
Leal was selected to the initial roster of the Venezuela national baseball team for the 2023 World Baseball Classic. However, he did not participate in the tournament, with manager Omar López citing concerns about preparation for the tournament.
