= Jordan Guerrero =

American baseball player (born 1994)

Tecolotes de los Dos Laredos
- Pitcher
- Born: May 31, 1994 (age 32); Oxnard, California, U.S.
- Bats: Left Throws: Left

Jordan Andrew Guerrero (born May 31, 1994) is a Mexican American professional baseball pitcher for the Tecolotes de los Dos Laredos of the Mexican League.

== Career ==
Guerrero attended Moorpark High School in Moorpark, California, where he played for the school's baseball team. He committed to attend Yavapai College to play college baseball and graduated from Moorpark in 2012.

=== Chicago White Sox ===
The Chicago White Sox selected him in the 15th round, with the 471st overall selection, of the 2012 Major League Baseball draft. Guerrero signed with the White Sox rather than attend college.

Guerrero pitched nine innings for the Bristol White Sox in 2012 after he signed, giving up three earned. He returned to Bristol in 2013, but was shut down with shoulder tendinitis after five games and missed the remainder of the season. In 2014, he pitched for the Kannapolis Intimidators as a relief pitcher, so that the White Sox could lessen his workload. In 27 games (nine starts) for Kannapolis he pitched to a 6–2 record and 3.46 ERA. He returned to starting in 2015 with Kannapolis before receiving a mid-season promotion to the Winston-Salem Dash. In 25 starts between the two teams he was 13–4 with a 3.08 ERA and 1.04 WHIP. Guerrero spent 2016 with the Birmingham Barons where he posted a 7–8 record and 4.83 ERA in 25 starts, and he returned to Birmingham in 2017, going 7–12 with a 4.18 ERA in another 25 starts. He began 2018 back with Birmingham, and was later promoted to the Triple-A Charlotte Knights, where he recorded a 7–2 record and 3.46 ERA in 12 starts. In 2019, pitching for the Charlotte Knights, Guerrero struggled to a 3–7 record with a 7.27 ERA, leading to his release on July 23, 2019.

=== Miami Marlins ===
On July 28, 2019, Guerrero signed a minor league deal with the Miami Marlins and was assigned to the Double-A Jacksonville Jumbo Shrimp. In 7 appearances for Jacksonville, he registered a 1.50 ERA with 12 strikeouts across 12.0 innings of work. Guerrero was released by the Marlins organization on August 27.

=== Algodoneros de Unión Laguna ===
On February 6, 2020, Guerrero signed with the Toros de Tijuana of the Mexican League. However, prior to the season on March 24, he was traded to the Algodoneros de Unión Laguna. He did not play in a game in 2020 due to the cancellation of the 2020 season because of the COVID-19 pandemic.

Guerrero returned to action in 2021, pitching in 11 games (starting 9) and logging a 5.81 ERA with 27 strikeouts across 48 innings of work. In 2022, Guerrero pitched in 9 contests for Unión Laguna, struggling to a 7.92 ERA with 7 strikeouts across 25 innings pitched.

=== Tecolotes de los Dos Laredos ===
On January 11, 2023, the Algodoneros traded Guerrero to the Tecolotes de los Dos Laredos in exchange for José Torres.

== Personal life ==
Guerrero is a dual citizen of the United States and Mexico.
