= Zoilo Almonte =

Dominican baseball player (born 1989)

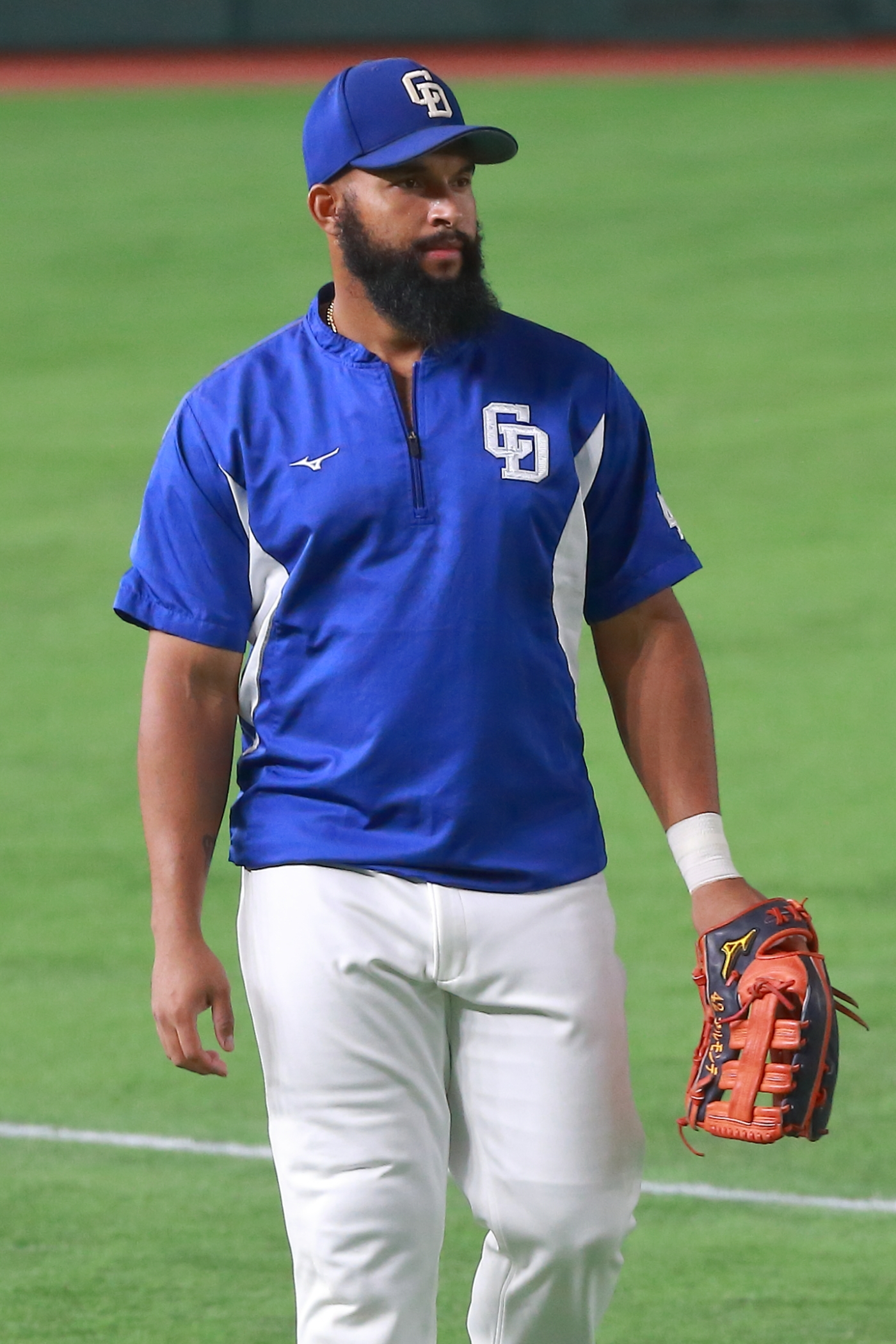
- Almonte with the Chunichi Dragons

Tecolotes de los Dos Laredos – No. 81
- Outfielder
- Born: June 10, 1989 (age 37); Santo Domingo, Dominican Republic
- Bats: Switch Throws: Right

Professional debut
- MLB: June 19, 2013, for the New York Yankees
- NPB: March 30, 2018, for the Chunichi Dragons
- KBO: April 4, 2021, for the KT Wiz

MLB statistics (through 2014 season)
- Batting average: .221
- Home runs: 2
- Runs batted in: 12

NPB statistics (through 2023 season)
- Batting average: .309
- Home runs: 32
- Runs batted in: 133

KBO statistics (through 2021 season)
- Batting average: .271
- Home runs: 7
- Runs batted in: 36
- Stats at Baseball Reference

Teams
- New York Yankees (2013–2014); Chunichi Dragons (2018–2020); KT Wiz (2021); Chunichi Dragons (2023)

Zoilo Manuel Almonte (born June 10, 1989) is a Dominican professional baseball outfielder for the Tecolotes de los Dos Laredos of the Mexican League. He has previously played in Major League Baseball (MLB) for the New York Yankees, in the KBO League for the KT Wiz, and in Nippon Professional Baseball (NPB) for the Chunichi Dragons.

== Career ==
=== New York Yankees ===
On July 2, 2005, Almonte was signed as an international free agent with the New York Yankees. He made his professional debut with the Dominican Summer League Yankees in 2006. In 2007, Almonte played for the rookie-level GCL Yankees, posting a .268/.307/.395 slash line with 3 home runs and 24 RBI. He returned to the team the following season, hitting .239 in 57 games. In 2009, he played for the Low-A Staten Island Yankees, slashing .274/.355/.440 with 7 home runs and 39 RBI. The following season, Almonte split the year between the Single-A Charleston River Dogs and the High-A Tampa Yankees, accumulating a .269/.331/.424 slash line between the two teams. In 2011, Almonte split the season between Tampa and the Double-A Trenton Thunder, logging a .276/.345/.459 batting line with 15 home runs and 77 RBI.

Almonte was added to the Yankees' 40 man roster after the 2011 season to protect him from the Rule 5 draft. For the week of June 11–17, 2012, Almonte was named Eastern League player of the week. Almonte spent the 2012 season with Trenton, where he hit .277/.322/.487 with 70 RBI and a career-high 21 home runs. Almonte began the 2013 season with the Triple-A Scranton/Wilkes-Barre RailRiders and was named player of the week of the International League on May 6, 2013.

The Yankees promoted Almonte to the major leagues on June 19, 2013. Almonte made his Major League debut in the 2nd game of a doubleheader against the Los Angeles Dodgers the same day he was called up, grounding out as a pinch hitter in the bottom of the 9th inning. He got his first major league hit the next day against Kyle Farnsworth of the Tampa Bay Rays, a pinch-hit single off the third base bag. He hit his first major league home run the very next day off Roberto Hernández of the Rays. He finished his rookie season with a .236/.274/.302 slash line and 9 RBI. Almonte was assigned to Scranton to begin the 2014 season, moving between them and the Yankees for the first few months of the season. On July 9, 2014, Almonte was recalled to replace Masahiro Tanaka, who was placed on the 15-day DL. On July 13, he was sent back down to Triple-A, but was recalled on July 28 to replace pitcher Jeff Francis on the roster after Francis was designated for assignment and released. Almonte was designated for assignment on September 2, and outrighted to Triple-A Scranton on September 5. On November 3, 2014, he elected free agency.

=== Atlanta Braves ===
Almonte signed a one-year deal with the Atlanta Braves on November 10, 2014. He was outrighted off the roster on March 31, 2015, and elected free agency on April 9.

=== Pericos de Puebla ===
On February 1, 2016, Almonte signed with the Pericos de Puebla of the Mexican League. Appearing in only 7 games with the team, Almonte posted a .250/.344/.321 slash with 1 RBI.

=== Sultanes de Monterrey ===
On April 12, 2016, Almonte was traded from the Pericos to the Sultanes de Monterrey. Almonte finished the season with Monterrey, recording a .288/.350/.495 batting line with 20 home runs and 77 RBI and was named a Mexican League All-Star. The following season, Almonte again earned All-Star honors after hitting .355/.421/.536 with 15 home runs and 70 RBI.

=== Chunichi Dragons ===
On December 27, 2017, Almonte was officially unveiled as a Chunichi Dragons player for the 2018 Nippon Professional Baseball season on an incentive laden ¥50,000,000, one-year deal. On March 30, 2018, Almonte made his NPB debut. In his debut year for Chunichi, Almonte posted a .321/.375/.486 batting line with 15 home runs and 77 RBI. He re-signed with the Dragons for the 2019 season on a one-year deal worth ¥100,000,000. Almonte played in 49 games for Chunichi in 2019, slashing .329/.362/.506 with 7 home runs and 25 RBI. In 2020, Almonte played in 62 games with the Dragons, hitting .294/.385/.463 with nine home runs and 29 RBI. On December 2, 2020, he became a free agent.

=== KT Wiz ===
On December 23, 2020, Almonte signed a one-year, $775,000 deal with the KT Wiz of the KBO League. Almonte slashed .271/.336/.404 with 7 home runs and 36 RBI in 60 games for the Wiz before suffering a slight tear in his right achilles tendon in June. He was released by the team on June 26, 2021, to clear roster space for the newly signed Jared Hoying.

=== Sultanes de Monterrey (second stint) ===
On January 31, 2022, Almonte signed with the Sultanes de Monterrey of the Mexican League. In 109 games he hit .355/.421/.536 with 15 home runs and 70 RBIs.

=== Chunichi Dragons (second stint) ===
On November 11, 2022, it was reported that Almonte had signed with former team, Chunichi Dragons of Nippon Professional Baseball ahead of the 2023 season alongside countryman, Orlando Calixte. In 28 games he slashed .189/.264/.204 with 1 home run and 2 RBI. He became a free agent following the 2023 season.

=== Sultanes de Monterrey (third stint) ===
On January 16, 2024, Almonte signed with the Sultanes de Monterrey of the Mexican League. In 78 games for Monterrey, he batted .326/.375/.599 with 22 home runs and 63 RBI.

Almonte made 80 appearances for Monterrey during the 2025 season, batting .291/.367/.510 with 15 home runs, 58 RBI, and one stolen base. On February 16, 2026, Almonte was released by the Sultanes.

=== Tecolotes de los Dos Laredos ===
On April 14, 2026, Almonte signed with the Tecolotes de los Dos Laredos of the Mexican League.
