= Estadio Yu'va =

Baseball stadium in Oaxaca, Mexico

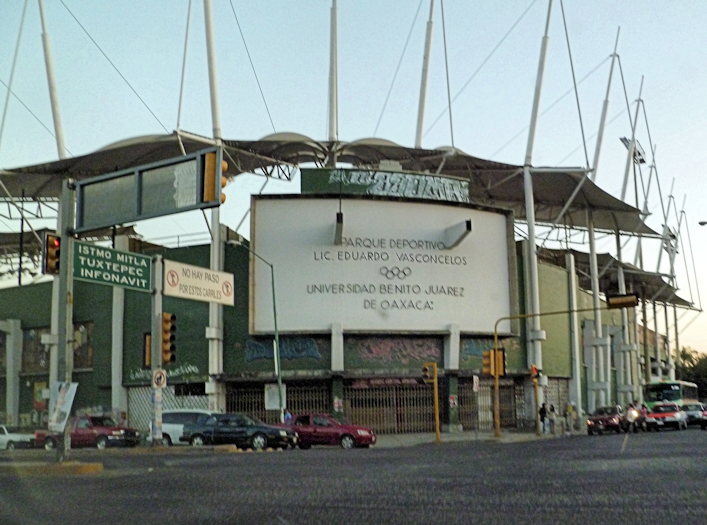
- Interactive map of Estadio Yu'va
- Full name: Parque Deportivo Lic. Eduardo Vasconcelos
- Location: Oaxaca de Juarez, Oaxaca, Mexico
- Coordinates: 17.070°N 96.713°W
- Owner: City of Oaxaca
- Capacity: 10,500
- Surface: FieldTurf
- Field size: Left Field: 339 feet (103 m); Center Field: 400 feet (120 m); Right Field: 339 feet (103 m)

Construction
- Built: 1950
- Opened: 1950
- Renovated: 2026
- Architect: BROISSINarchitects

Tenant
- Guerreros de Oaxaca

Estadio Yu'va, is a stadium in Oaxaca, Oaxaca, Mexico. It is primarily used for baseball, and is the home field of the Guerreros de Oaxaca Liga Mexicana de Béisbol baseball team since the team entered the league in 1996. It currently holds 10,500 spectators.

The stadium opened in 1950 as the home for the athletics department for the Universidad Autónoma Benito Juárez de Oaxaca. It is named after Eduardo Vasconcelos, who was Governor of Oaxaca from 1947 to 1950. The stadium's playing surface is FieldTurf. A remodeling prior to the 2008 season brought the stadium a new video board and improved seats in charge of the Mexican architectural firm Broissin architects.
