= Gerardo Broissin =

Mexican architect

- Born: 1975 (age 50–51); Mexico
- Education: Anahuac University
- Occupation: Architect
- Awards: WAN Awards, Performing Spaces, London Design Vanguard Award, 10 most promising world architects, New York, USA.
- Buildings: Shelter 02; Estadio Lic. Eduardo Vasconselos; Centro Cultural Vladimir Kaspe; Sala de Conciertos Roberto Cantoral
- Website: www.broissin.com

Gerardo Broissin (born 1975) is a Mexican architect.

== Biography ==
Gerardo Broissin was born in Mexico City in 1975. In 2007, the New York magazine Architectural Record awarded him the Design Vanguard Prize as One of the 10 Most Vanguard Architects in the world. Broissin leads the BROISSINarchitects workshop office in Mexico City, which he founded in 2007. He is a Professor and Dean of Architecture at Anahuac University since 2022.

He graduated in 2000 with honors from the Anáhuac University Architecture School after being an exchange student in the Southern California Institute of Architecture in Los Angeles. He studied with Agustín Hernández Navarro for two years, and later worked professionally with Fernando Romero, as well as Federico Soriano. Since 2007 he has been a professor at the Anáhuac University Architecture School.

In 2016, Broissin was selected as jury of the WAN Awards for the Performance Spaces category in London, which he won in 2015. In 2014, he delivered a lecture at the Texas A&M Architecture Lecture Series, and a few years before at the College of Art and Design and Built Environment of Nottingham Trent University, School of Art and Design in England.

His work has been published in the five continents; it is characterized for the development and contribution of innovative proposals in the solution of every project, comprising an extensive range of forms, textures and ideologies

Author of the Grafiti DF book, which shows the evolution of graffiti in Mexico City since its origins.

== Significant projects ==
- Anahuac Cultural Center
- Green Hills School
- Coorporativo Banorte Tlalpan
- Shelter 02
- Estadio Lic. Eduardo Vasconselos
- Centro Cultural Vladimir Kaspe
- Centro Cultural Roberto Cantoral

== Books ==
- Grafiti DF, 2018
- Grafiti DF Biblioteca Nacional de Mexico

== Awards ==
- Bronze in Architectural Design / Green architecture The Architecture Master prize List of architecture awards
- WAN Awards, Performing Spaces, Centro Cultural Roberto Cantoral, London, England, 2015
- LICC London Int'l Creative Competition, Honorable Mention, Installation, Del Avioncito al Barquito de Papel , 2015
- Finalist A+ Awards Architizer, Green Hills Kindergarten, New York, 2015
- First Place, Design´s Icon Award, Architectural Digest, Roberto Cantoral Concert Hall, Mexico 2012
- Building of the year, Roberto Cantoral Concert Hall, CNN Expansión Mexico, 2012
- Anahuac Leadership Medal, Mexico 2011
- First Place, National Interior Award. Sustainability, Shelter 02. Mexico 2010
- Golden Medal, Excellence Award, IV International Interior, Design and Landscape Biennale, International Federation of Interior Architects/Designers 2008
- Design Vanguard Award, 10 most promising world architects, 2007 Architectural Record, New York, USA.
- Best timber use Award, American Hardwood Export Council Latin America 2006,
- Work and Experience, Conde Nast Mexico, 2005
- First Place, Design´s Icon Award, Architectural Digest, Mexico 2006
- Finalist, Design´s Icon Award, Architectural Digest, México 2005.
- First Place, VK40 Competition, now Vladimir Kaspé Cultural Center, La Salle University, México, 2005
- First Place, National Interior Award. Commercial,
- Jury Selection, International architecture competition, Egypt Government, GEM-The Grand Egyptian Museum. Giza, Egypt 2003
