= Félix Pérez (baseball) =

Cuban baseball player (born 1984)

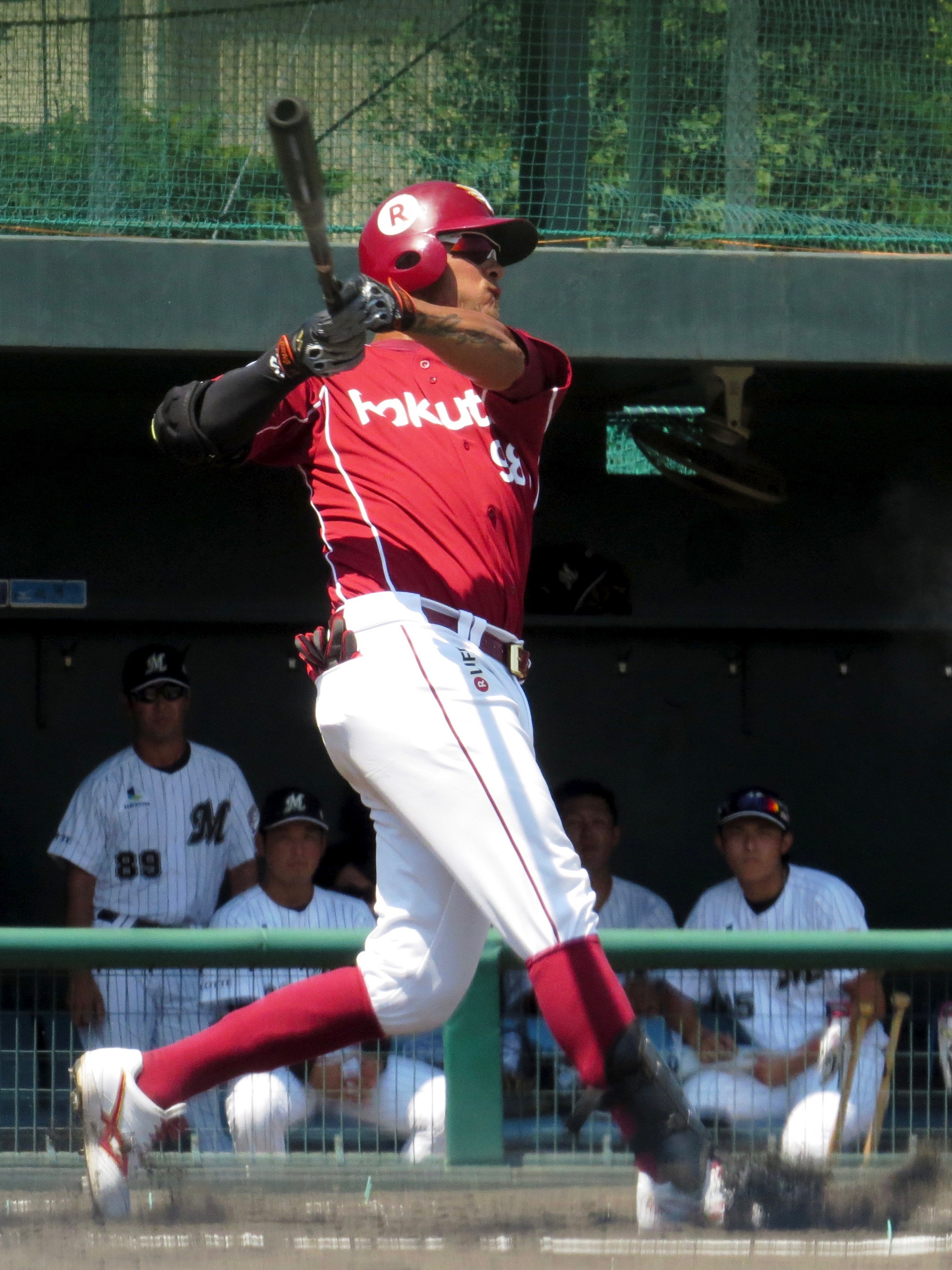
- Pérez with the Tohoku Rakuten Golden Eagles

Piratas de Campeche – No. 45
- Outfielder
- Born: November 14, 1984 (age 41); Isla de la Juventud, Cuba
- Bats: Left Throws: Left

NPB debut
- July 12, 2016, for the Tohoku Rakuten Golden Eagles

NPB statistics (through 2016 season)
- Batting average: .244
- Home runs: 5
- Runs batted in: 15
- Stats at Baseball Reference

Teams
- Tohoku Rakuten Golden Eagles (2016)

Félix Pérez (born November 14, 1984) is a Cuban professional baseball outfielder for the Piratas de Campeche of the Mexican League. He has previously played in Nippon Professional Baseball (NPB) for the Tohoku Rakuten Golden Eagles.

== Career ==
Prior to playing in the Reds system, he played in the Cuban National Series. He first played for Isla de la Juventud in 2005–2006, hitting .246. He also pitched briefly. The next season, he hit .287 in 84 games, again pitching briefly, and in 2007–2008, he hit .257 with 20 doubles in 90 games.

=== Cincinnati Reds ===
Signed by the Cincinnati Reds by scout Richard Jimenez, Pérez hit over .300 twice in his first four seasons in the USA. He split 2010 between the Dominican Summer League Reds, with whom he hit .429 in 16 games, the Lynchburg Hillcats (.338 batting average in 16 games) and the Carolina Mudcats (.266 batting average in 35 games), for a composite .322 batting average. Pérez committed 8 errors in 2011 for Carolina while hitting .257 in 92 games; he also hit .206 with two walks and a homer in nine games for the Louisville Bats, for a combined .252 batting average in 101 games. He hit .301 and had 16 assists defensively in 116 games for Louisville in 2012. In 2013, Pérez batted .262 with 10 home runs and 65 RBI in 126 games for Louisville, while fielding .995.

During 2014 Pérez posted some of his best numbers. He played for the Triple–A Louisville Bats the entire season, appearing in 122 games. He finished the season with a batting average of .280 and had a slugging percentage of .450. He accrued 74 RBI (the team high), 12 home runs (second highest on his team), 36 doubles (the team high) and an OPS of .775. Defensively, Pérez committed just 3 errors. He was elected to the International League All-Star team and hit a double and a triple during the Triple–A All-Star game.

=== Sultanes de Monterrey ===
Pérez played for the Sultanes de Monterrey of the Mexican League in 2015 and hit .312 with 20 home runs and 70 RBI in 94 games. He played for Caracas again that winter and produced at a .332/.425/.545 clip with 20 doubles in 55 games. He again supplemented another team in the Caribbean Series, this time joining the Tigres de Aragua. Pérez hit .200/.407/.200 with 7 walks in six games. He also made a couple errors at first, including a crucial one with a two-run lead in the 7th inning of the finale against Mexico's Venados de Mazatlán that enabled them to score the tying run en route to a comeback win.

=== Rakuten Golden Eagles ===
Pérez played for the Tohoku Rakuten Golden Eagles of Nippon Professional Baseball in 2016, hitting .304/.371/.543 with 19 home runs and 68 RBI between them - only .244 with 5 home runs in 22 game for Rakuten, .315 with 14 home runs in 64 games for Monterrey.

=== Sultanes de Monterrey (second stint) ===
Pérez returned to the Sultanes de Monterrey of the Mexican League for the 2017 season, appearing in 28 games and hitting .284/.359/.500 with six home runs and 23 RBI before he was placed on the reserve list for the rest of the season on May 7, 2017. He became a free agent after the season.

=== Rieleros de Aguascalientes ===
On March 22, 2018, Pérez signed with the Rieleros de Aguascalientes of the Mexican League. Pérez made 85 appearances for Aguascalientes prior to his trade to Monterrey.

=== Sultanes de Monterrey (third stint) ===
Pérez was traded back to the Sultanes de Monterrey on August 7, 2018. He made 27 appearances for the team down the stretch, hitting .296/.341/.609 with nine home runs and 27 RBI. Pérez played in 89 games for the Sultanes during the 2019 season, slashing .308/.389/.644 with 30 home runs and 94 RBI.

Pérez did not play in a game in 2020 due to the cancellation of the Mexican League season because of the COVID-19 pandemic.

=== Bravos de León ===
On February 2, 2021, Pérez was traded to the Bravos de León of the Mexican League. Pérez made 17 appearances for León, hitting .200/.324/.400 with three home runs and 10 RBI.

=== Toros de Tijuana ===
On December 18, 2021, Pérez was traded to the Toros de Tijuana of the Mexican League in exchange for the rights to Mitch Lively. In 2022, Pérez played in 87 games for Tijuana, and hit .323/.400/.728 with 38 home runs and 109 RBI. Following the season, he was named the league's Most Valuable Player. He returned to the Toros in 2023, batting .271/.381/.545 with 20 home runs and 59 RBI in 73 games.

=== Olmecas de Tabasco ===
On November 9, 2023, Pérez, along with Nick Struck, were traded to the Olmecas de Tabasco in exchange for David Gutiérrez. He made 44 appearances for the Olmecas in 2024, slashing .372/.434/.562 with six home runs, 25 RBI, and one stolen base.

Pérez made 27 appearances for Tabasco in 2025, hitting .282/.368/.437 with four home runs and 13 RBI. On June 24, 2025, Pérez was released by the Olmecas.

=== Piratas de Campeche ===
On July 1, 2025, Pérez signed with the Piratas de Campeche of the Mexican League.
