= Acereros de Monclova =

Professional baseball team in the Mexican League

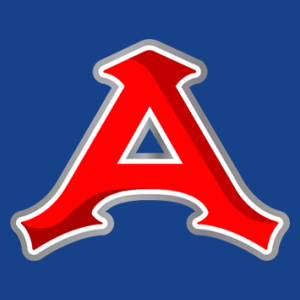
Logo	Cap insignia

Information
- League: Liga Mexicana de Beisbol (Zona Norte)
- Location: Monclova, Coahuila
- Ballpark: Estadio Kickapoo Lucky Eagle (1975–present)
- Founded: 1974
- Nickname: Furia Azul (Blue Fury)
- Serie del Rey championships: 1 (2019)
- Division championships: 3 (1998, 2015, 2019)
- Former name: Acereros de Monclova; Mineros de Coahuila
- Former ballpark: Parque Deportivo Ahmsa
- Colors: Blue, red, white
- Ownership: Gerardo Benavides Pape
- General manager: Valentín Gámez
- Manager: Juan Castro
- Media: Zocalo, XHMZI-FM, XHMAP
- Website: acereros.com.mx

The Acereros de Monclova (English: Monclova Steelers) are a professional baseball team in the Mexican League (LMB) based in Monclova, Coahuila, Mexico. Their home ballpark is Estadio de Béisbol Monclova, which has a capacity of 8500 people. The Acereros replaced the Mineros de Coahuila in the 1976 season.

== History ==
Officially named the Acereros del Norte (Steelers of the North), the Acereros de Monclova (Monclova Steelers) debuted in the Mexican League on 23 March 1974, as the Mineros de Coahuila (Miners of Coahuila) against the Indios de Ciudad Juárez at Parque Deportivo AHMSA. They were managed by "Sergeant Shrapnel" Tomás Herrera. The team moved into Estadio Monclova on 16 March 1975, with a game between the Mineros and the Alijadores de Tampico. The team reached the playoffs for the first time in 1976, but were eliminated by Juárez.

In 1980, the team changed their name to Acereros de Monclova and were led by manager Victor Favela. They advanced to the postseason by virtue of finishing in third place in the Northern Zone, but lost 4–0 to the Tecolotes de los Dos Laredos.

The 1986 Steelers set a record for runs scored with 203, matching also their record most home runs hit in a game. They finished the regular season as the leader of the North Division with a 76–51 record, with a five-game lead over the Sultanes de Monterrey. However, after winning in six games in the first round of the playoffs over Dos Laredos, they fell in the North Division Championship Series to the Sultanes in seven games. In 1987, Monclova defeated Monterrey in five games, but were then defeated in five games by the Tecolotes. Monclova was defeated by the Tecolotes again in the first round of the 1990 playoffs.

Northern Steel Group purchased the team in 1992 and rebranded it as the Acereros del Norte. They took third place in 1993, but fell in five games to Monterrey in the first round. The Acereros returned to the playoffs in 1996, but lost to Monterrey, 4–2, in the first round. Monclova set the attendance record for all of the Mexican League in 1997. In the playoffs, they lost to the Olmecas de Tabasco in four games.

In 1998, the Steelers made it to the championship finals for the first time in 24 years. They were managed by Aurelio Rodriguez, and included players such as Jesus "Chito" Ríos, Juan Manuel Palafox, Boi Rodriguez, Luis Raven. In that postseason, Monclova beat the Langosteros de Cancún and then went on to defeat the Tigres Capitalinos in seven games. In the final round, they were swept by the Guerreros de Oaxaca in four games. They returned to the postseason in 1999, beating Cancun in the first round, but losing to the Tigres, 4–2, in the second round. They won the first round in 2001 against the Broncos de Reynosa in six games, but lost second round to the Diablos Rojos del México, 4–2.

The Acereros did not return to the playoffs until 2007 where they were defeated by Monterrey in seven games. They finished the 2008 season in first place. They went on to win the first round against the Dorados de Chihuahua in seven games, but lost the next round to Monterrey in four games.

In February 2017, the grandson of founder Harold Pape, Gerardo Benavides Pape, purchased the team bringing it back to family ownership.

== Stadium ==
The Acereros home stadium is Monclova Stadium, located in Monclova, Coahuila, Mexico. It has natural grass surface and capacity for 11,000 people. It was inaugurated on 16 March 1975, and remodeled and enlarged in 1996.

== Roster ==
Acereros de Monclova roster
Players	Coaches/Other
Pitchers: 29 (United States) R. J. Alaniz ∞; 77 (Dominican Republic) Iván Armstrong; 17 (Mexico) Édgar Arredondo ∞; -- (United States) Colten Brewer; 54 (United States) A. J. Candelario; 35 (Mexico) Amilcar Carreón; 53 (Dominican Republic) Ángel Felipe; 44 (United States) Ryley Gilliam; 32 (United States) Jackson Goddard; -- (United States) Mike Kickham ∞; 93 (Mexico) Jonathan López; 26 (United States) Jake McSteen; 94 (Mexico) Rolando Mora; 51 (Dominican Republic) Estalin Ortiz; 87 (Mexico) Pedro Reyes; 20 (Mexico) Wilmer Ríos; 69 (Mexico) Jorge Rodríguez; 98 (Mexico) José Soria; 75 (Mexico) Óscar Soria; 45 (Dominican Republic) Jorge Tavárez; Catchers: 15 (Mexico) Santiago Chávez ∞; 29 (Venezuela) Rusber Estrada; 92 (Mexico) José Félix; 30 (Mexico) Fernando Flores; 71 (Mexico) Óscar Jiménez ∞; Infielders: 48 (Mexico) Rodolfo Amador; 12 (Mexico) Elvin Carrillo; 22 (Dominican Republic) Andretty Cordero; 66 (Venezuela) Jecksson Flores; 41 (Dominican Republic) Ramón Hernández; 40 (United States) Ryan Hernández; 70 (Mexico) Juan Mora; 55 (Mexico) Aldo Núñez; 62 (Mexico) Miguel Palos ∞; 18 (Venezuela) José Peraza; 14 (Mexico) Carlos Tirado ∞; 13 (United States) Alan Trejo; Outfielders: 95 (Mexico) Bryan Corral; 3 (Mexico) Leo Heras; 82 (Dominican Republic) Magneuris Sierra	Manager: 27 (Mexico) Juan Gabriel Castro; Coaches: 6 (Mexico) Martín Arzate (bench); 68 (Mexico) Juan Carlos Barandica (first base); 5 (Mexico) Carlos Gastélum (third base); 9 (Panama) José Macías (hitting); 33 (Mexico) Isidro Márquez (pitching); 47 (Mexico) Salvador Robles (bullpen); 83 (Mexico) Carlos Rodríguez (catchers); 7-day injured list; ~ Development list; # Rehab assignment; ∞ Reserve list; ‡ Restricted list; § Suspended list; † Temporarily inactive list; Roster updated July 17, 2026; Transactions; → More rosters: MiLB • Mexican League

=== Retired numbers ===
The Acereros de Monclova have retired the following numbers:

Leo
Valenzuela
OF

Retired
Aurelio
Rodríguez
3B

Retired
Aurelio
Monteagudo
P

Retired
Ricardo
Sáenz
OF
Retired 9 August 2010
