= Estadio Kickapoo Lucky Eagle =

Stadium in Monclova, Mexico

- "El Horno más Grande de México" (Mexico's Biggest Furnace)
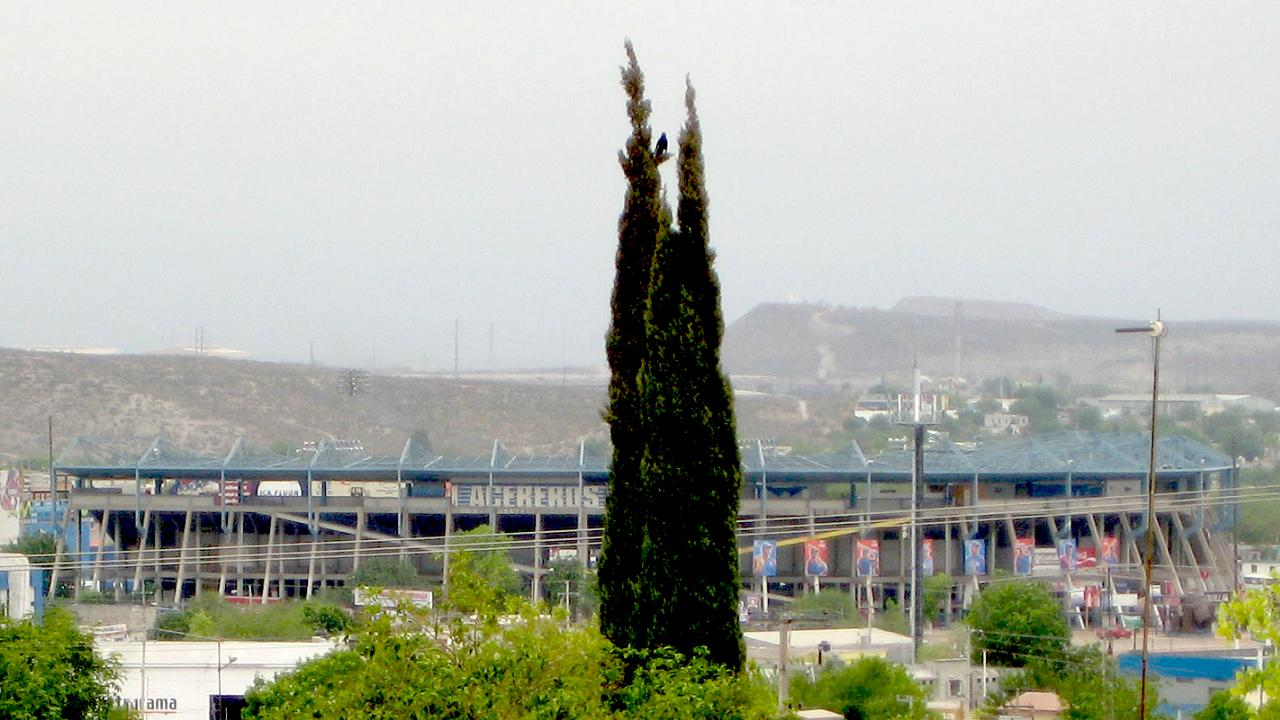
- Estadio de Béisbol Monclova, April 2008
- Interactive map of Estadio Kickapoo Lucky Eagle
- Location: Monclova, Coahuila, Mexico
- Coordinates: 26°54′24.89″N 101°26′38.82″W
- Capacity: 8,500
- Field size: Left Field: 325 feet (99 m); Center Field: 410 feet (120 m); Right Field: 325 feet (99 m)

Construction
- Opened: 16 March 1975

Tenant
- Acereros de Monclova (1975–present)

Estadio Kickapoo Lucky Eagle is a stadium in Monclova, Mexico. It is primarily used for baseball and is the home field of the Monclova Steelers. It holds 8,500 people.
