= Uni-Trade Stadium =

Baseball stadium in Laredo, Texas, US

Coordinates: 27.55399°N 99.45544°W

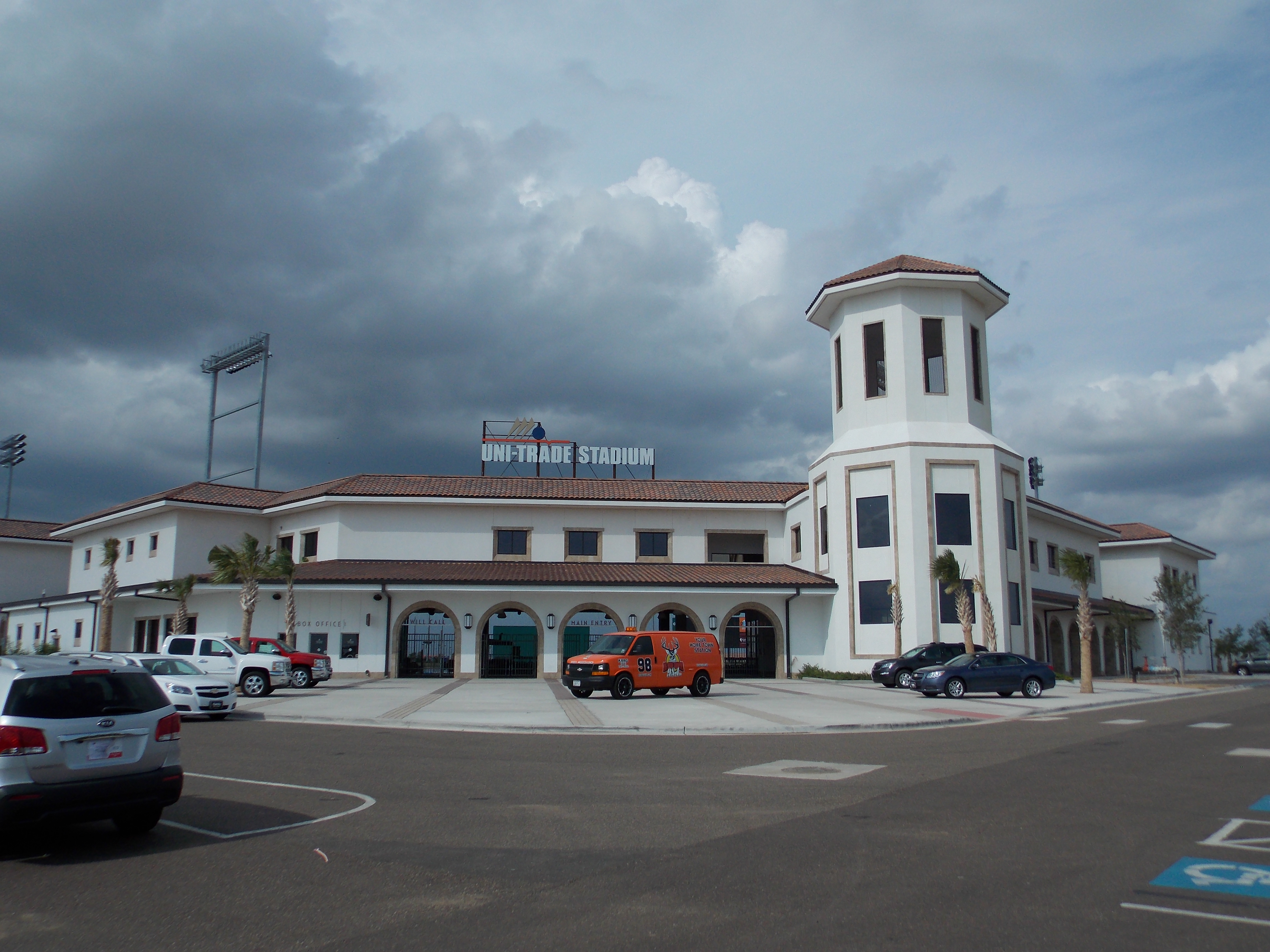
- Interactive map of Uni-Trade Stadium
- Former names: Laredo Ballpark (planning/construction)
- Location: 6320 Sinatra Parkway; Laredo, TX 78045
- Owner: City of Laredo
- Capacity: 6,000 (Baseball); 16,000 (Concerts)
- Surface: TifSport Bermudagrass
- Field size: Left Field: 335 feet Left Center Field: 385 feet Center Field: 405 feet Right Center Field: 385 feet Right Field: 335 feet

Construction
- Groundbreaking: June 11, 2011
- Opened: May 17, 2012
- Cost: $18 million
- Architects: HKS; Humphries & Sanchez
- Structural engineer: Puig Engineering LLC
- General contractor: Leyendecker Construction

Tenants
- Laredo Lemurs (AAIPB) (2012–2016); Laredo Roses; Tecolotes de los Dos Laredos (LMB) (2018–present)

2011 promotional image of the planned Laredo Ballpark now named Uni-Trade Stadium

The Uni-Trade Stadium is a baseball stadium in Laredo, Texas. The stadium is the United States home to The Tecolotes de los Dos Laredos, a bi-national Mexican League professional baseball team, and the Laredo Roses, a women's full-contact American football team in the Sugar N Spice Football League. The stadium is also used for youth soccer leagues, youth and prep baseball games, and concerts. It was the home of the Laredo Lemurs, a baseball team in the American Association, from 2012 to 2016.

== History ==
The Laredo Ballpark project was first approved by the city council and was voted in favor of (with 61.32% of the votes in favor and 38.68% against) constructing it with money collected by a .25% sales tax increase for the LEC since 2004 of which there is a surplus of about $18 million. The project consisted of building a new multiuse Baseball field near the Laredo Energy Arena (now Sames Auto Arena). On December 9, 2011, it was announced that the stadium would be named Uni-Trade Stadium, after Uni-Trade Forwarding LLC, a local freight forwarder. The park opened on May 17, 2012, with the Lemurs defeating the defending American Association champion Grand Prairie AirHogs 5–1 in front of a crowd of 5,923.

Despite posting winning records in each of their five seasons, including the 2015 American Association championship, Lemurs attendance plummeted from 187,845 in 2012 (fourth in a 14-team league) to just 41,955 in 2016, lowest in the league. Less than three weeks prior to the 2017 season, the Lemurs left the American Association and folded as result of a lawsuit between owner Arianna Torres and other members of Laredo Baseball Holdings, the Lemurs' ownership group. Torres allegedly accumulated over $500,000 of debts as well.

After the stadium sat empty for the 2017 season, the Rojos del Águila de Veracruz of the Triple-A Mexican League relocated to the region and took the name of the Tecolotes de los Dos Laredos, a franchise that previously played on both sides of the US-Mexico border (Laredo and Nuevo Laredo) from 1985 to 2004. The team splits their home games between Uni-Trade Stadium and Parque la Junta on the Mexican side.

== Field ==
The baseball field playing surface was designed and built by sports field contractor Texas Multi-Chem of Kerrville, Texas. The baseball field's natural grass surface is TifSport hybrid Bermuda and the root zone consists of an 8" layer of USGA sand and Dakota peat. The field also contains an internal drainage system to help avoid rain-outs.
