= Walmart Park =

Stadium

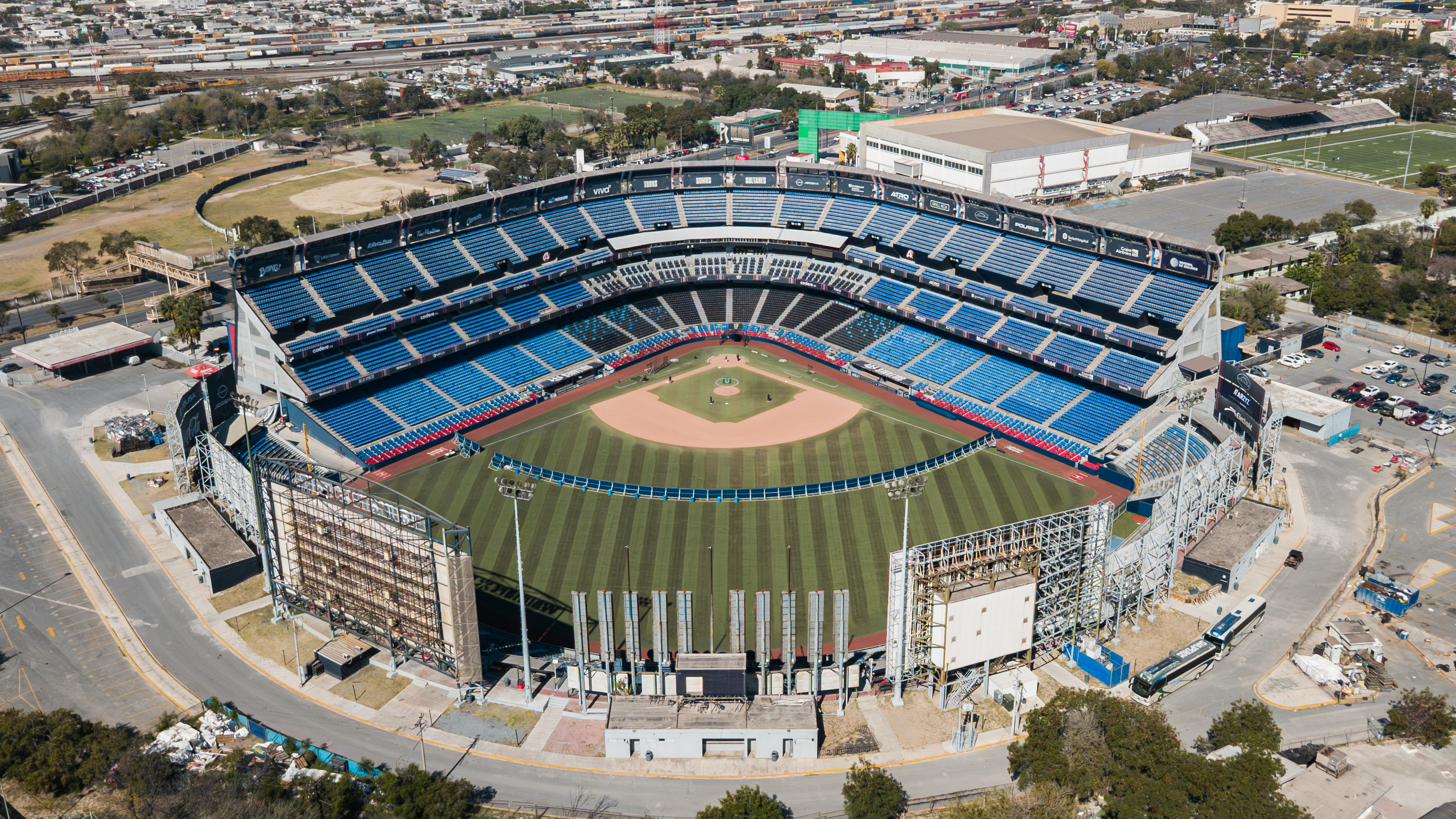
- Walmart Park, 2026
- Interactive map of Walmart Park
- Location: Avenida Manuel L. Barragan; Monterrey, Nuevo León, Mexico
- Coordinates: 25°43′6.66″N 100°18′56.70″W
- Capacity: 22,078
- Surface: Artificial (2018-present); Grass (1990-2017)
- Field size: Left Field: 325 feet (99 m); Center Field: 405 feet (123 m); Right Field: 325 feet (99 m)
- Public transit: Niños Héroes metro station

Construction
- Opened: 13 July 1990

Tenants
- Sultanes de Monterrey (1990–present); Industriales de Monterrey (1989–1994)

Website
- sultanes.com.mx/estadio/

The Estadio de Béisbol Monterrey, officially known as Walmart Park and popularly known as Palacio Sultán, is a baseball stadium in Monterrey, Nuevo León. It is the home venue of the Sultanes Monterrey Mexican League baseball team. It holds 22,078 people, making it the largest baseball stadium in Mexico and the third-largest in Hispanic America.

== Location ==
The stadium is located meters away from the Estadio Universitario, the AFAIM stadium (a football stadium), the Niños Heroes Park, and the Niños Heroes Metro station, and not far from the Plaza de Toros Monumental Monterrey "Lorenzo Garza" (Bullring).

The stadium was inaugurated in games starting on 13 July 1990 when Monterrey played host to the World Youth Baseball Championship (for players 16 years old and under). The first LMB game was held on 20 July 1990 when the Sultanes defeated the Tecolotes de Nuevo Laredo in 12 innings.

In 1991 it hosted some preliminary games during the Pan American Games, although the baseball final series between host Cuba and Puerto Rico was held at Estadio Latinoamericano in Havana.

== Major League Baseball ==
In August 1996, the stadium hosted a three-game series between the National League's San Diego Padres and New York Mets, marking the first time Major League Baseball was played in Mexico. The Padres took two out of three games from the Mets. It was also the site of an Opening Day game between the Colorado Rockies and the Padres on April 4, 1999, which the Rockies won, 8–2. The Padres and defending National League champion Los Angeles Dodgers played at the stadium for a three-game series in May 2018. The Dodgers took two out of three games from the Padres. In preparation for that series, the stadium underwent a $5.2 million facelift, which included the installation of new artificial turf, and instant on/off LED stadium lighting. Four Dodger pitchers combined to throw a no-hitter in the series opener on May 4, 2018. For the 2019 MLB Season, the stadium hosted 3 two-game series. First, the Diamondbacks and Rockies played two Spring Training matchups in Monterrey. Afterward, the Cincinnati Reds and St. Louis Cardinals played two regular-season games in April 2019. Finally, on 4 May and 5 May 2019 the Houston Astros played the Los Angeles Angels. The Boston Red Sox concluded their 2025 spring training on March 24–25 with two games against the Sultanes at the stadium.

== Concerts ==
The stadium has also hosted other events such as concerts. Some artists that have played at the stadium are Maná, the late Selena, Justin Bieber, RBD and Guns N' Roses.

American pop-star Michael Jackson planned to perform here in November 1993 as part of his Dangerous World Tour, but the concert was canceled due to Jackson's illness.
