= Parque la Junta =

Baseball field in Nuevo Laredo, Mexico

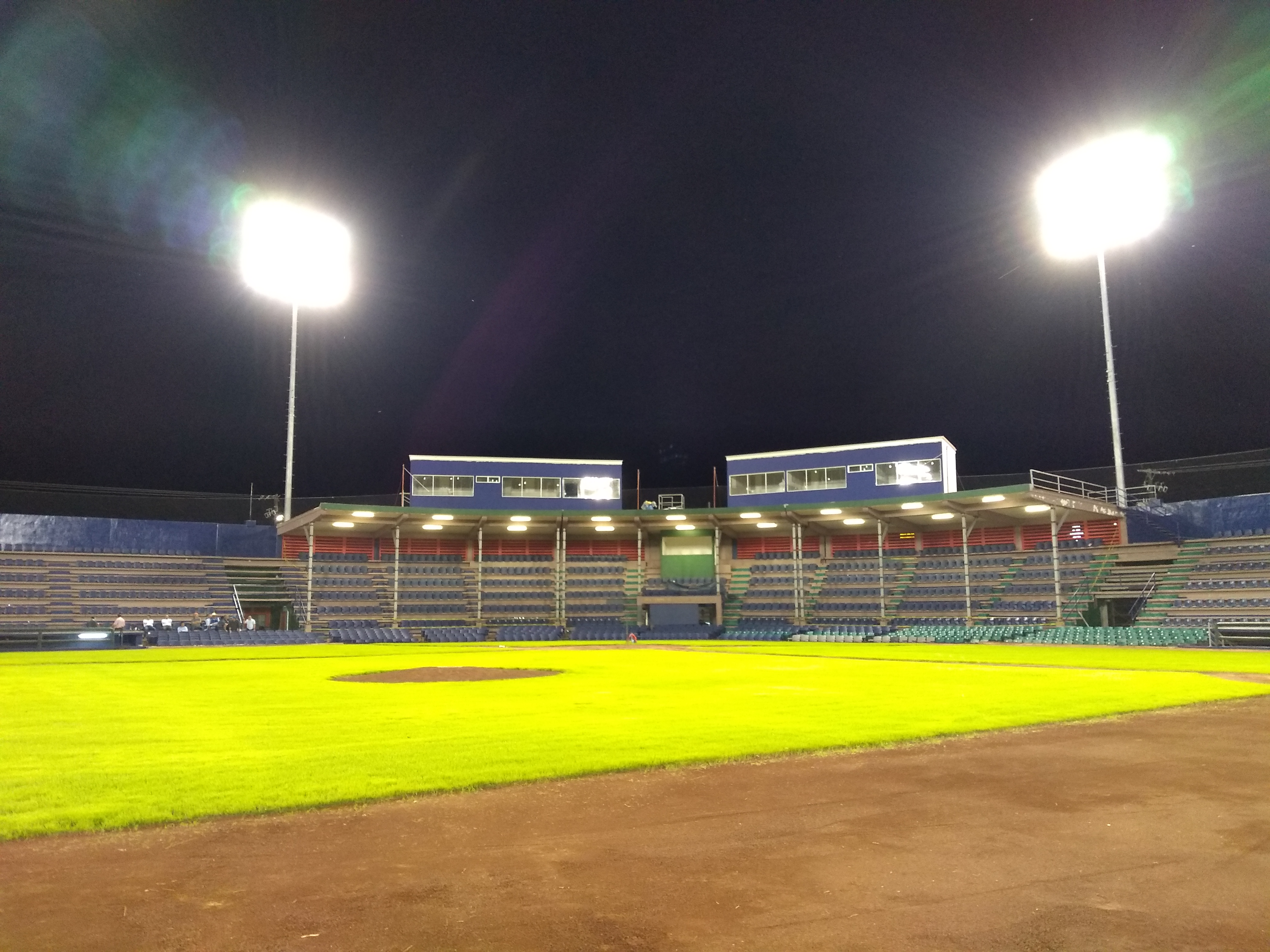
- Vista nocturna del Parque La Junta
- Interactive map of Parque la Junta
- Location: Nuevo Laredo, Tamaulipas, Mexico
- Coordinates: 27.477379°N 99.491393°W
- Owner: City of Nuevo Laredo
- Capacity: 5,000

Construction
- Built: 1946
- Opened: 1947

Tenant
- Tecolotes de los Dos Laredos (LMB) 1947–2003; 2019–present

Parque la Junta (La Junta Park) is a baseball field built in 1947 in Nuevo Laredo, Tamaulipas, Mexico. The ball park has a capacity of 5,000 people. The stadium was home to the five-time champion Mexican Baseball League team Tecolotes de los Dos Laredos (Two Laredos Owls) from 1947 to 2003. In 2019, the Tecolotes began using the park as their home stadium in Mexico instead of Estadio Nuevo Laredo. Thus, they will split home games between Parque la Junta and Uni-Trade Stadium, which is located across the river in Laredo, Texas.
