= Parque Kukulcán Alamo =

Baseball stadium in Merida, Mexico

- Parque Kukulcán
- Kukulcán Alamo Park
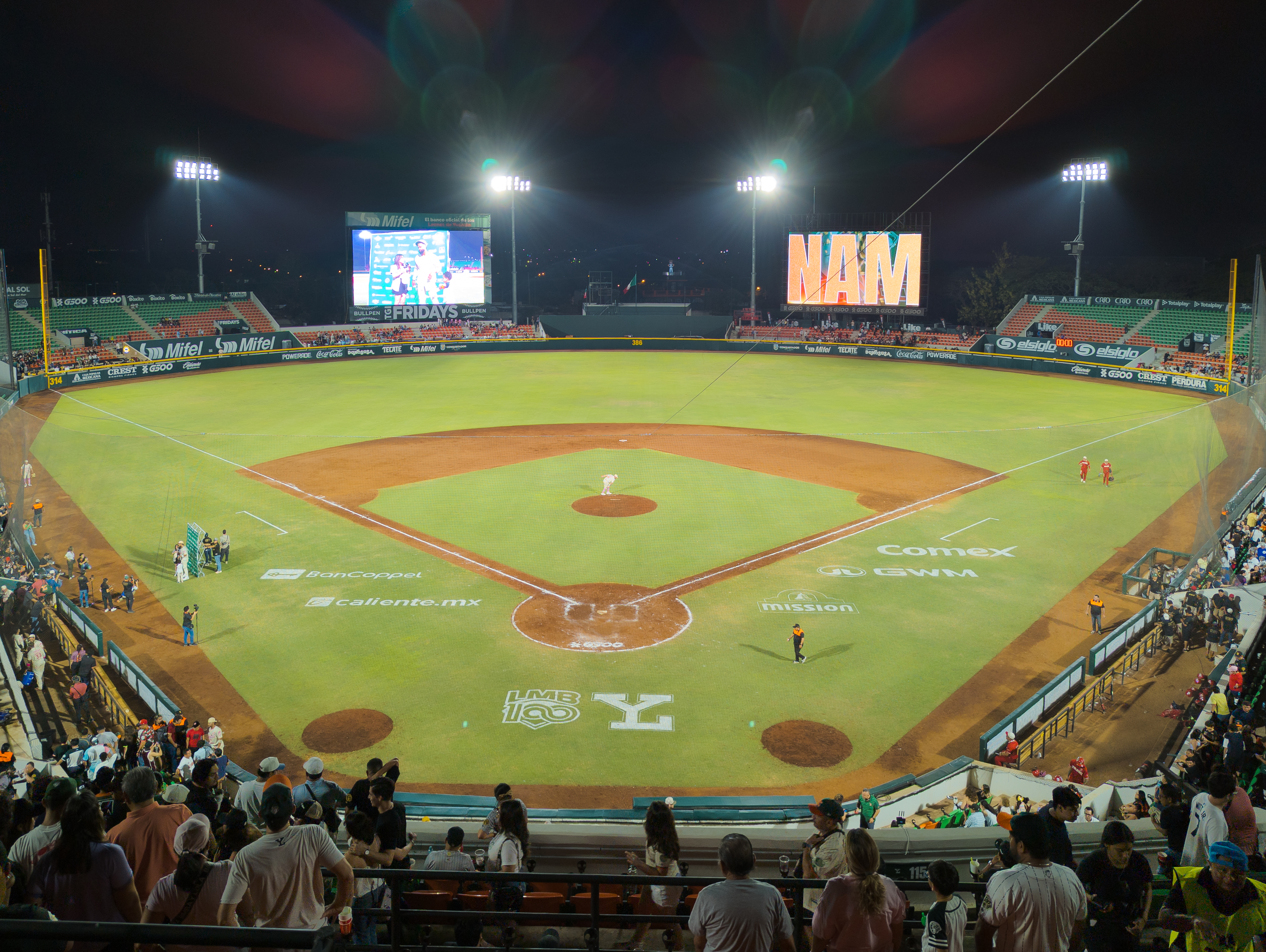
- The park in 2025
- Interactive map of Parque Kukulcán Alamo
- Location: C 28 x Circuito Colonias Col. Morelos Oriente. C.P. 97174. Mérida, Yucatán, Mexico
- Coordinates: 20°56′28.36″N 89°35′45.54″W
- Owner: Leones de Yucatán
- Capacity: 14,500
- Field size: Left Field: 330 ft Center Field: 400 ft Right Field: 330 ft

Construction
- Opened: 1982
- Renovated: 2025

Tenant
- Leones de Yucatán

Parque de Beisbol Kukulcán is a stadium located in the city of Mérida, Yucatán, Mexico. It is primarily used for baseball, and is the home field of the Leones de Yucatán (Yucatán Lions) Mexican League baseball team. It holds 14,500 people and was opened in 1982. The stadium is named for Kukulkán, the Maya feathered serpent deity.

== See also ==
- Estadio Carlos Iturralde - a football stadium in Mérida
