= Estadio de la Revolución =

Sports arena in Coahuila, Mexico

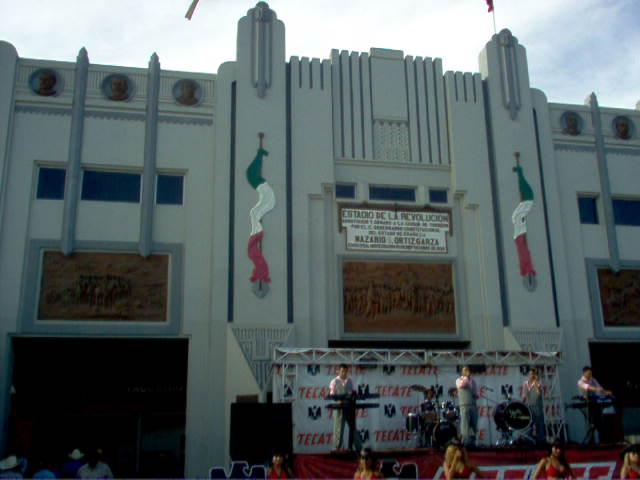
- Estadio de la Revolución in 2009
- Interactive map of Estadio de la Revolución
- Location: Sports Nazario S. Ortiz Garza; Torreón, Coahuila, Mexico
- Coordinates: 25°32′22.47″N 103°25′45.04″W
- Capacity: 7,640
- Surface: Grass
- Field size: Left Field: 333 feet (101 m); Center Field: 422 feet (129 m); Right Field: 333 feet (101 m)

Construction
- Opened: 15 September 1932
- Renovated: Fall 2002

Tenant
- Algodoneros de Unión Laguna (1940–present)

Estadio de la Revolución is a sports arena located near the downtown area of Torreón in Coahuila, Mexico. It has a seating capacity of 7,640. Though used mainly for baseball games, it sometimes hosts concerts and other non-sport events. It is the home field of the Algodoneros de Unión Laguna baseball team, and as such, it is the oldest professional baseball field in Mexico still in function. Since it was originally constructed as a multi sport stadium and featured a running track the Estadio de la Revolución features the largest foul territory of any ball park within the Mexican League, the area of the former running track. The stadium is named to commemorate the Mexican Revolution of 1910–1920, a political change that was still recent at the time of the venue's opening on 15 September 1932. The stadium was renovated in the fall of 2002 to provide a refurbished appearance for the baseball team's reorganization, renaming, and new season starting in 2003.

== See also ==
- Estadio Corona (1970) - Torreón's former soccer stadium
- Estadio Corona - Torreón's current soccer stadium
