= Tecolotes de los Dos Laredos =

Professional baseball team in the Mexican League

Logo
Cap insignia

Information
- League: Liga Mexicana de Béisbol (Northern Division)
- Location: Nuevo Laredo; Laredo
- Ballpark: Estadio Nuevo Laredo (2008–2010, 2018); Uni-Trade Stadium (2018-); Parque la Junta (1947–2004, 2019-); Veterans Field (1985–2004)
- Founded: 1940 (original); 2018 (modern)
- Serie del Rey championships: 2 (1977, 1989)
- League championships: 5 (1953, 1954, 1958, 1977, 1989)
- Former name: Tecolotes de Nuevo Laredo (1949–1984); La Junta de Nuevo Laredo (1940–1946)
- Colors: Navy blue, white, green, red
- Mascot: Owl
- President: José Antonio Mansur Galán
- Manager: Dan Firova

The Tecolotes de los Dos Laredos (English: Two Laredos Owls), formerly known as the Tecolotes de Nuevo Laredo (English: Nuevo Laredo Owls), are a professional baseball team in the Mexican League. The Tecolotes are a binational baseball team, splitting their home games between Nuevo Laredo, Tamaulipas, Mexico and Laredo, Texas, United States. Their home games in Mexico are played at Parque la Junta, while their home games in the United States are played at Uni-Trade Stadium. They are the only Mexican League team to play outside of Mexico.

== History ==
Logo of the Tecolotes de Nuevo Laredo

The Tecolotes de los dos Laredos were originally named the Tecolotes de Nuevo Laredo from their founding in 1940 to 1985, during which time they only played in Nuevo Laredo. The team's first game was played on 30 March 1940 against Unión Laguna. In 1985, the Tecolotes played games on both of the sides of the border in Nuevo Laredo and Laredo. In 2004, the Tecolotes were transferred to Tijuana and were renamed Potros de Tijuana. The Tecolotes were the Mexican League Champions in 1953, 1954, 1958, 1977, and 1989; and were runners-up in 1945, 1955, 1959, 1985, 1987, 1992, and 1993. Baseball returned to the city in 2008 when the Rieleros de Aguascalientes were transferred to Nuevo Laredo as the Tecolotes de Nuevo Laredo. The Tecolotes did not play in the 2011–2012 seasons, but had hopes of returning for the 2013 season. The owner was trying to sell the team to León, Guanajuato. On November 22, 2011, the team was sold to a Colombian investor and the team was transferred to Ciudad del Carmen, Campeche.

After the 2017 season, the Rojos del Águila de Veracruz franchise was relocated to Nuevo Laredo, and the team was rebranded to the Tecolotes de los Dos Laredos in 2018. They play half of their home games at Estadio Nuevo Laredo and the other half at Uni-Trade Stadium.

=== Championships ===
Year	Champions	Series	Subchampions
1945	Alijadores de Tampico	*	Tecolotes de Nuevo Laredo
1953	Tecolotes de Nuevo Laredo	*	Sultanes de Monterrey
1954	Tecolotes de Nuevo Laredo	*	Leones de Yucatán
1955	Tigres Capitalinos	2-0	Tecolotes de Nuevo Laredo
1958	Tecolotes de Nuevo Laredo	*	Diablos Rojos del México
1959	Petroleros de Poza Rica	*	Tecolotes de Nuevo Laredo
1977	Tecolotes de Nuevo Laredo	4-1	Diablos Rojos del México
1985	Diablos Rojos del México	4-1	Tecolotes de los Dos Laredos
1987	Diablos Rojos del México	4-1	Tecolotes de los Dos Laredos
1989	Tecolotes de los Dos Laredos	4-2	Leones de Yucatán
1992	Tigres Capitalinos	4-2	Tecolotes de los Dos Laredos
1993	Olmecas de Tabasco	4-1	Tecolotes de los Dos Laredos

== Roster ==
Tecolotes de los Dos Laredos roster
Players		Coaches/Other
Pitchers: 71 (United States) Nate Antone ∞; 30 (Mexico) Ricardo Chapa; 12 (Dominican Republic) Carlos Contreras; 18 (United States) Adrian De Horta; 50 (Mexico) Darío Gardea; 5 (United States) Michael Gómez; -- (United States) Jordan Guerrero ∞; 25 (United States) Jonathan Haab; 94 (Mexico) Diego Hernández; 45 (United States) Tyler Ivey; 51 (Dominican Republic) Franklyn Kilome; 39 (United States) Gil Luna; 82 (United States) Drew Parrish; 6 (Mexico) Adolfo Ramírez; 40 (United States) Jackson Rees; -- (Mexico) Erick Rodríguez; 75 (Venezuela) Wilking Rodríguez; 31 (United States) Andrew Vasquez ∞; 54 (United States) Taylor Williams	Catchers: 44 (Mexico) Francisco Córdoba; -- (Mexico) Alejandro Flores; 77 (Mexico) Eduardo Luna; Infielders: 24 (Panama) Jonathan Araúz; 22 (Venezuela) Alí Castillo; 23 (Dominican Republic) Luis de los Santos; 65 (Mexico) Alan López; 32 (Mexico) Italo Motta; 30 (Dominican Republic) Bladimir Restituyo; 3 (Dominican Republic) José Rodríguez; 86 (Mexico) Marcos Valenzuela; Outfielders: 11 (United States) Ryan Aguilar; 81 (Dominican Republic) Zoilo Almonte; 99 (United States) Cade Gotta; 47 (United States) Jordan Luplow; 75 (United States) Miles Simington	Manager: -- (Dominican Republic) Mendy López; Coaches: -- (Mexico) José Ángel Chávez (third base); -- (Mexico) Ricardo Cuevas (bench); -- (Mexico) Erick Sandoval (first base); -- (Mexico) Félix Tejeda (bullpen); 7-day injured list; ~ Development list; # Rehab assignment; ∞ Reserve list; ‡ Restricted list; § Suspended list; † Temporarily inactive list; Roster updated September 24, 2026; Transactions; → More rosters: MiLB • Mexican League

== Notable players ==
- (Mexico) Teolindo Acosta
- (United States) Domonic Brown
- (United States) Willard Brown
- (United States) Joe Decker
- (Venezuela) Freddy Galvis
- (Venezuela) Junior Guerra
- (Cuba) Jackie Hernández
- (United States) Willie Horton
- (United States) Jesse Jefferson
- (United States) Mike Kekich
- (United States) Keone Kela
- (Mexico) Max León
- (Panama) Ivan Murrell
- (Mexico) Vicente Palacios
- (United States) Robert Stock

== Television coverage ==
Since the 2024 season, all games are televised in the United States on KXNU-DT2.
