= Softball at the 2008 Summer Olympics – Team squads =

Below are team rosters for Softball at the 2008 Summer Olympics.

== Australia ==
- Jodie Bowering
- Kylie Cronk
- Kelly Hardie
- Tanya Harding
- Sandy Lewis
- Simmone Morrow
- Tracey Mosley
- Stacey Porter
- Melanie Roche
- Justine Smethurst
- Danielle Stewart
- Natalie Titcume
- Natalie Ward
- Belinda Wright
- Kerry Wyborn

== Canada ==
- Lauren Bay Regula
- Alison Bradley
- Erin Cumpstone
- Sheena Lawrick
- Danielle Lawrie
- Caitlin Lever
- Robin Mackin
- Noémie Marin
- Melanie Matthews
- Erin McLean
- Dione Meier
- Kaleigh Rafter
- Jennifer Salling
- Megan Timpf
- Jennifer Yee

== China ==
- Guo Jia
- Lei Donghui
- Li Chunxia
- Li Qi
- Lü Wei
- Pan Xia
- Sun Li
- Tan Ying
- Wu Di
- Xin Minhong
- Yu Huili
- Yu Yanhong
- Zhang Ai
- Zhang Lifang
- Zhou Yi

== Chinese Taipei ==
- Chen Miao Yi
- Chiang Hui Chuan
- Chueh Ming Hui
- Hsu Hsiu Ling
- Huang Hui Wen
- Lai Meng Ting
- Lai Sheng Jung
- Li Chiu Ching
- Lin Su Hua
- Lo Hsiao Ting
- Lu Hsueh Mei
- Pan-Tzu Hui
- Tung Yun Chi
- Wen Li Hsiu
- Wu Chia Yen

== Japan ==
- Naho Emoto
- Motoko Fujimoto
- Megu Hirose
- Emi Inui
- Sachiko Ito
- Ayumi Karino
- Satoko Mabuchi
- Yukiyo Mine
- Masumi Mishina
- Rei Nishiyama
- Hiroko Sakai
- Rie Sato
- Mika Someya
- Yukiko Ueno
- Eri Yamada

== Netherlands ==
- Noémi Boekel
- Marloes Fellinger
- Sandra Gouverneur
- Petra van Heijst
- Judith van Kampen
- Kim Kluijskens
- Saskia Kosterink
- Jolanda Kroesen
- Daisy de Peinder
- Marjan Smit
- Rebecca Soumeru
- Nathalie Timmermans
- Ellen Venker
- Britt Vonk
- Kristi de Vries

== United States ==
- Monica Abbott
- Laura Berg
- Crystl Bustos
- Andrea Duran
- Jennie Finch
- Tairia Flowers
- Victoria Galindo
- Lovieanne Jung
- Kelly Kretschman
- Lauren Lappin
- Caitlin Lowe
- Jessica Mendoza
- Stacey Nuveman
- Cat Osterman
- Natasha Watley

== Venezuela ==
- Yuruby Alicart
- Mariangee Bogado
- Marianella Castellanos
- Zuleima Cirimelle
- Denisse Fuenmayor
- Johana Gómez
- Desiree Mújica
- Yusmary Pérez
- Jineth Pimentel
- Geraldine Puertas
- Maribel Riera
- Mailes Rodríguez
- Rubilena Rojas
- Yaicey Sojo
- María Soto
