= Softball at the 2006 Asian Games =

- Venue: Al-Rayyan Baseball & Softball Venue
- Dates: 10–14 December 2006
- Competitors: 75 from 5 nations

Softball was contested by five East Asian countries at the 2006 Asian Games at Doha, Qatar from December 10 to December 14, 2006. All games were played at the Al-Rayyan Baseball and Softball Venue.

== Schedule ==
P	Preliminary round	½	Semifinals	F	Final	G	Grand final

Event↓/Date →	10th Sun	11th Mon	12th Tue	13th Wed		14th Thu	
Women	P	P	P	P	½	F	G

== Medalists ==
Event	Gold	Silver	Bronze
Women	Japan; Rei Nishiyama; Masumi Mishina; Ayumi Karino; Emi Naito; Megu Hirose; Sachiko Ito; Eri Yamada; Mariko Goto; Aki Uenishi; Yukiko Ueno; Mariko Masubuchi; Yuko Endo; Yuka Suzuki; Emi Inui; Satoko Mabuchi	Chinese Taipei; Han Hsin-lin; Lo Hsiao-ting; Lai Meng-ting; Lin Su-hua; Huang Hui-wen; Li Chiu-ching; Chen Miao-yi; Chiang Hui-chuan; Lai Sheng-jung; Wu Chia-yen; Wen Li-hsiu; Tung Yun-chi; Pan Tzu-hui; Hsu Hsiu-ling; Lu Hsueh-mei	China; Li Qi; Lü Wei; Sun Li; Lü Yi; Zhang Ai; Wu Di; Zhang Lifang; Yu Huili; Li Chunxia; Zhou Yi; Yu Yanhong; Tan Ying; Ding Hong; Jiang Xin; Xin Minhong

== Squads ==
Squads

China	Chinese Taipei	Japan	North Korea
Li Qi; Lü Wei; Sun Li; Lü Yi; Zhang Ai; Wu Di; Zhang Lifang; Yu Huili; Li Chunxia; Zhou Yi; Yu Yanhong; Tan Ying; Ding Hong; Jiang Xin; Xin Minhong	Han Hsin-lin; Lo Hsiao-ting; Lai Meng-ting; Lin Su-hua; Huang Hui-wen; Li Chiu-ching; Chen Miao-yi; Chiang Hui-chuan; Lai Sheng-jung; Wu Chia-yen; Wen Li-hsiu; Tung Yun-chi; Pan Tzu-hui; Hsu Hsiu-ling; Lu Hsueh-mei	Rei Nishiyama; Masumi Mishina; Ayumi Karino; Emi Naito; Megu Hirose; Sachiko Ito; Eri Yamada; Mariko Goto; Aki Uenishi; Yukiko Ueno; Mariko Masubuchi; Yuko Endo; Yuka Suzuki; Emi Inui; Satoko Mabuchi	Kang In-sun; Kim Jin-ok; Ri Kyong-hui; Kim Kyong-hui; Kim Un-ju; Ri Yun-mi; Jong Yong-suk; Kim Song-chun; Kim Jong-sun; Yun Kyong-hui; Kim Un-sim; Kim Un-hyang; Kim In-sil; Pak Hyon-ok; Choe Song-ok
South Korea			
Kim Jin-kyung; Pak Sun-yeo; Lee Bok-hee; Jung Young-mi; Suk Eun-jung; Lee Eun-mi; Hong Ki-ja; An Na; Kim Min-young; Yoon Hye-young; Park Eun-ok; Lim Mi-ran; Cho Hui-ju; Nam Hee-sun; An Yeon-soon			

== Results ==
All times are Arabia Standard Time (UTC+03:00)

=== Preliminary ===
Pos	Team	Pld	W	L	RF	RA	PCT	GB	Qualification
1	Japan	4	4	0	20	4	1.000	—	Semifinals
2	China	4	3	1	17	7	.750	1	Semifinals
3	Chinese Taipei	4	2	2	11	8	.500	2	Semifinals
4	North Korea	4	1	3	6	14	.250	3	Semifinals
5	South Korea	4	0	4	3	24	.000	4	

Source: Official website

10 December; 8:30	South Korea	0–7 (F/6)	Chinese Taipei	Al-Rayyan Baseball & Softball Venue, Doha; Umpires: Liu Juan (CHN)
10 December; 8:30	LP: Kim Jin-kyung		WP: Han Hsin-lin	Al-Rayyan Baseball & Softball Venue, Doha; Umpires: Liu Juan (CHN)

Team	1	2	3	4	5	6	7	R	H	E
Chinese Taipei	2	0	3	0	0	2	—	7	11	1
South Korea	0	0	0	0	0	0	—	0	1	1

10 December; 11:30	China	2–3	Japan	Al-Rayyan Baseball & Softball Venue, Doha; Umpires: Noel Bumagat (PHI)
10 December; 11:30	LP: Li Qi		WP: Mariko Masubuchi	Al-Rayyan Baseball & Softball Venue, Doha; Umpires: Noel Bumagat (PHI)
10 December; 11:30	HR: Wu Di (1)			Al-Rayyan Baseball & Softball Venue, Doha; Umpires: Noel Bumagat (PHI)

Team	1	2	3	4	5	6	7	R	H	E
Japan	0	0	0	1	2	0	0	3	5	1
China	0	0	0	0	0	1	1	2	5	0

10 December; 14:00	Chinese Taipei	2–0	North Korea	Al-Rayyan Baseball & Softball Venue, Doha; Umpires: Xing Lisha (CHN)
10 December; 14:00	WP: Lin Su-hua		LP: Kim Song-chun	Al-Rayyan Baseball & Softball Venue, Doha; Umpires: Xing Lisha (CHN)
10 December; 14:00	HR: Li Chiu-ching (1)			Al-Rayyan Baseball & Softball Venue, Doha; Umpires: Xing Lisha (CHN)

Team	1	2	3	4	5	6	7	R	H	E
North Korea	0	0	0	0	0	0	0	0	3	1
Chinese Taipei	0	0	0	0	2	0	X	2	8	1

11 December; 9:30	North Korea	1–5	China	Al-Rayyan Baseball & Softball Venue, Doha; Umpires: Ong Ka Aun (MAS)
11 December; 9:30	LP: Kang In-sun		WP: Lü Wei	Al-Rayyan Baseball & Softball Venue, Doha; Umpires: Ong Ka Aun (MAS)
11 December; 9:30			HR: Wu Di (1), Lü Yi (1)	Al-Rayyan Baseball & Softball Venue, Doha; Umpires: Ong Ka Aun (MAS)

Team	1	2	3	4	5	6	7	R	H	E
China	0	3	1	0	0	0	1	5	8	1
North Korea	0	0	0	0	0	0	1	1	4	2

11 December; 12:30	Japan	3–0	Chinese Taipei	Al-Rayyan Baseball & Softball Venue, Doha; Umpires: Joel Binarao (PHI)
11 December; 12:30	WP: Yukiko Ueno		LP: Lai Sheng-jung	Al-Rayyan Baseball & Softball Venue, Doha; Umpires: Joel Binarao (PHI)
11 December; 12:30	HR: Emi Naito (1), Masumi Mishina (1)			Al-Rayyan Baseball & Softball Venue, Doha; Umpires: Joel Binarao (PHI)

Team	1	2	3	4	5	6	7	R	H	E
Chinese Taipei	0	0	0	0	0	0	0	0	2	0
Japan	1	1	0	0	0	1	X	3	8	0

11 December; 14:30	China	5–1	South Korea	Al-Rayyan Baseball & Softball Venue, Doha; Umpires: Rully Rinaldi Andriyanto (INA)
11 December; 14:30	WP: Li Qi		LP: Lim Mi-ran	Al-Rayyan Baseball & Softball Venue, Doha; Umpires: Rully Rinaldi Andriyanto (INA)
11 December; 14:30	HR: Wu Di (2)			Al-Rayyan Baseball & Softball Venue, Doha; Umpires: Rully Rinaldi Andriyanto (INA)

Team	1	2	3	4	5	6	7	R	H	E
South Korea	0	1	0	0	0	0	0	1	5	0
China	0	4	0	0	0	1	X	5	8	1

12 December; 8:30	South Korea	1–8 (F/5)	Japan	Al-Rayyan Baseball & Softball Venue, Doha; Umpires: Liu Juan (CHN)
12 December; 8:30	LP: Cho Hui-ju		WP: Mariko Goto	Al-Rayyan Baseball & Softball Venue, Doha; Umpires: Liu Juan (CHN)
12 December; 8:30			HR: Yuka Suzuki (1)	Al-Rayyan Baseball & Softball Venue, Doha; Umpires: Liu Juan (CHN)

Team	1	2	3	4	5	6	7	R	H	E
Japan	0	3	0	2	3	—	—	8	8	0
South Korea	1	0	0	0	0	—	—	1	3	3

12 December; 11:00	Chinese Taipei	2–5	China	Al-Rayyan Baseball & Softball Venue, Doha; Umpires: Toyomatsu Tabinuki (JPN)
12 December; 11:00	LP: Wu Chia-yen		WP: Lü Wei	Al-Rayyan Baseball & Softball Venue, Doha; Umpires: Toyomatsu Tabinuki (JPN)

Team	1	2	3	4	5	6	7	R	H	E
China	2	1	0	0	1	0	1	5	9	0
Chinese Taipei	0	1	0	0	1	0	0	2	9	2

12 December; 14:15	Japan	6–1	North Korea	Al-Rayyan Baseball & Softball Venue, Doha; Umpires: Hsu Chan Kun-ying (TPE)
12 December; 14:15	WP: Yuko Endo		LP: Kang In-sun	Al-Rayyan Baseball & Softball Venue, Doha; Umpires: Hsu Chan Kun-ying (TPE)
12 December; 14:15	HR: Megu Hirose (1)			Al-Rayyan Baseball & Softball Venue, Doha; Umpires: Hsu Chan Kun-ying (TPE)

Team	1	2	3	4	5	6	7	R	H	E
North Korea	0	0	0	0	0	1	0	1	5	2
Japan	2	0	0	0	0	4	X	6	10	2

13 December; 8:30	North Korea	4–1	South Korea	Al-Rayyan Baseball & Softball Venue, Doha; Umpires: Tanate Kultate (THA)
13 December; 8:30	WP: Kang In-sun		LP: Lim Mi-ran	Al-Rayyan Baseball & Softball Venue, Doha; Umpires: Tanate Kultate (THA)

Team	1	2	3	4	5	6	7	R	H	E
South Korea	0	0	1	0	0	0	0	1	1	4
North Korea	0	0	3	0	0	1	X	4	8	2

=== Final round ===
Semifinals
1	Japan	3
2	China	0
3	Chinese Taipei	2
4	North Korea	1

Final
2	China	7
3	Chinese Taipei	10

Grand final
1	Japan (F/5)	7
3	Chinese Taipei	0

==== Semifinals ====
13 December; 11:30	China	0–3	Japan	Al-Rayyan Baseball & Softball Venue, Doha; Umpires: Chen Kuo-hwa (TPE)
13 December; 11:30	LP: Lü Wei		WP: Yukiko Ueno	Al-Rayyan Baseball & Softball Venue, Doha; Umpires: Chen Kuo-hwa (TPE)

Team	1	2	3	4	5	6	7	R	H	E
Japan	0	1	0	1	0	0	1	3	6	1
China	0	0	0	0	0	0	0	0	5	1

13 December; 14:15	Chinese Taipei	2–1	North Korea	Al-Rayyan Baseball & Softball Venue, Doha; Umpires: Haruhi Goto (JPN)
13 December; 14:15	WP: Lin Su-hua		LP: Kim Song-chun	Al-Rayyan Baseball & Softball Venue, Doha; Umpires: Haruhi Goto (JPN)

Team	1	2	3	4	5	6	7	R	H	E
North Korea	0	0	0	0	0	0	1	1	3	0
Chinese Taipei	1	0	0	0	1	0	X	2	8	2

==== Final ====
14 December; 8:30	China	7–10	Chinese Taipei	Al-Rayyan Baseball & Softball Venue, Doha; Umpires: Toyomatsu Tabinuki (JPN)
14 December; 8:30	LP: Li Qi		WP: Lin Su-hua	Al-Rayyan Baseball & Softball Venue, Doha; Umpires: Toyomatsu Tabinuki (JPN)
14 December; 8:30	HR: Zhang Ai (1)		HR: Lai Meng-ting (1)	Al-Rayyan Baseball & Softball Venue, Doha; Umpires: Toyomatsu Tabinuki (JPN)

Team	1	2	3	4	5	6	7	R	H	E
Chinese Taipei	0	3	0	4	0	3	0	10	11	0
China	4	0	3	0	0	0	0	7	7	3

==== Grand final ====
14 December; 14:00	Japan	7–0 (F/5)	Chinese Taipei	Al-Rayyan Baseball & Softball Venue, Doha; Umpires: Noel Bumagat (PHI)
14 December; 14:00	WP: Yukiko Ueno		LP: Han Hsin-lin	Al-Rayyan Baseball & Softball Venue, Doha; Umpires: Noel Bumagat (PHI)

Team	1	2	3	4	5	6	7	R	H	E
Chinese Taipei	0	0	0	0	0	—	—	0	0	0
Japan	2	0	2	3	X	—	—	7	10	0

== Final standing ==
Rank	Team	Pld	W	L
1st place, gold medalist(s)	Japan	6	6	0
2nd place, silver medalist(s)	Chinese Taipei	7	4	3
3rd place, bronze medalist(s)	China	6	3	3
4	North Korea	5	1	4
5	South Korea	4	0	4
