= Deaths in July 2002 =

The following is a list of notable deaths in July 2002.

Entries for each day are listed alphabetically by surname. A typical entry lists information in the following sequence:

- Name, age, country of citizenship at birth, subsequent country of citizenship (if applicable), reason for notability, cause of death (if known), and reference.

== July 2002 ==
=== 1 ===
- Sid Avery, 83, American photographer (Marlon Brando, Humphrey Bogart, Elizabeth Taylor).
- John Barr, 83, American professional basketball player (Penn State, St. Louis Bombers) and coach (Susquehanna University).
- Mikhail Krug, 40, Russian singer, shot.
- Pedro Maratea, 89, Argentine actor.
- Meyer Reinhold, 92, American classical scholar.
- K. Venkatalakshmma, 96, Indian Bharatanatyam dancer.
- Maritta Wolff, 83, American author, novels adapted to film: Whistle Stop, The Man I Love.

=== 2 ===
- Bob Boston, 83, American baseball player.
- Earle Brown, 75, American composer, cancer.
- Ray Brown, 75, American jazz bassist, known for working with Oscar Peterson and Ella Fitzgerald.
- Robert I. Friedman, 51, American investigative journalist.
- Jean-Yves Daniel-Lesur, 93, French organist and composer.
- James Lee, 79, American screenwriter, heart failure and emphysema.

=== 3 ===
- Henry Cianfrani, 79, American state senator who served prison time on corruption charges, stroke.
- Jimmy Edwards, 49, American professional football player (Minnesota Vikings).
- Earl Francis, 66, American baseball player (Pittsburgh Pirates, St. Louis Cardinals).
- Michel Henry, 80, French philosopher, phenomenologist and novelist.
- Kenneth Ross MacKenzie, 90, American nuclear physicist.

=== 4 ===
- Gerald Bales, 83, Canadian organist, choirmaster and composer.
- Benjamin O. Davis Jr., 89, American U.S. Air Force four-star general and commander of the World War II Tuskegee Airmen, Alzheimer's disease.
- Mansoor Hekmat, 51, Iranian theorist, cancer.
- Ivan Moffat, 84, British screenwriter, film producer and socialite.
- Lutz Moik, 71, German actor.
- Luigi Prato, 64, Italian Olympic rower (1960).
- Sten Samuelson, 76, Swedish architect.
- Laurent Schwartz, 87, French mathematician.
- Winnifred Van Tongerloo, 98, British-American oldest living survivor of the Titanic.
- Gene Wilson, 76, American professional football player (SMU, Green Bay Packers).

=== 5 ===
- Paul Claudon, 82, French film producer and actor.
- Harold Dejan, 93, American New Orleans jazz alto saxophonist and bandleader, best remembered as leader of the Olympia Brass Band.
- Antonio Domenicali, 66, Italian racing cyclist and Olympic champion in track cycling (1956).
- Brett Hill, 57, Australian Olympic swimmer (1964).
- Katy Jurado, 78, Mexican actress, kidney failure, chronic obstructive pulmonary disease.
- Zdzisław Mrożewski, 93, Polish actor.
- José Rua, 90, Puerto Rican sports shooter and Olympian (1952).
- Paul Weiss, 101, American philosopher and author, founded The Review of Metaphysics and the Metaphysical Society of America.
- Reinhard Wenskus, 86, German historian.
- Wallace G. Wilkinson, 60, American businessman and politician, 57th Governor of Kentucky, stroke.
- Ted Williams, 83, American baseball player (Boston Red Sox), manager (Washington Senators/Texas Rangers) and member of the MLB Hall of Fame, heart attack.

=== 6 ===
- Dhirubhai Ambani, 69, Indian businessman, stroke.
- Alexandru Dan, 94, Romanian Olympic gymnast (1936).
- John Frankenheimer, 72, American film and television director (Birdman of Alcatraz, The Manchurian Candidate, Seven Days in May), heart attack, stroke.
- Cheikh El Hasnaoui, 91, Algerian singer.
- Kenneth Koch, 77, American poet and playwright, leukemia.
- Thakur Ram Lal, 72, Indian politician.
- Ugo Lombardi, 90, Italian cinematographer.
- Haji Abdul Qadeer, 51, Afghan Northern Alliance leader, shot.
- William B. Ruger, 86, American firearms designer and entrepreneur.
- Pietro Valpreda, 69, Italian anarchist, poet, dancer and novelist.

=== 7 ===
- Juan Alcántara, 82, Chilean footballer.
- Lester Brinkley, 37, American football player (Dallas Cowboys).
- Kirkor Canbazyan, 90, Turkish Olympic cyclist (1936).
- Jim Cherry, 30, American musician, heart problems.
- Bison Dele, 33, American basketball player (Denver Nuggets, Detroit Pistons), murdered.
- Gerard Hallie, 90, Dutch Olympic rower (1936).
- Apollo Lynge, 62, Danish Olympic cross-country skier (1968).
- Dorle Soria, 101, American publicist, music producer and journalist.
- John Butler Walden, 62, Tanzanian military officer.
- Ray Wood, 71, English professional footballer.

=== 8 ===
- Ward Kimball, 88, American animator (Snow White and the Seven Dwarfs, Peter Pan, Mary Poppins), pneumonia.
- Clarence Lightner, 80, American politician and mortician.
- Lorna Marshall, 103, American anthropologist.
- Patrick Rodger, 81, British Anglican prelate, Bishop of Oxford.
- William Sarjeant, 66, British-born Canadian geologist.
- Earl Shannon, 80, American basketball player (Providence Steamrollers, Boston Celtics), and college coach.
- Sidney Spivak, 74, Canadian politician.

=== 9 ===
- Gerald Campion, 81, English actor (Billy Bunter of Greyfriars School).
- George Elias, 88, Australian rower (1936).
- Bruno Freindlich, 92, Soviet and Russian actor.
- Ron Scarlett, 91, New Zealand paleozoologist.
- Madron Seligman, 83, British politician.
- Kenneth Snowman, 82, British jeweller.
- Dave Sorenson, 54, American basketball player (Ohio State Buckeyes, Cleveland Cavaliers, Philadelphia 76ers), cancer.
- Rod Steiger, 77, American actor (In the Heat of the Night, On the Waterfront, Doctor Zhivago), Oscar winner (1968), kidney failure.

=== 10 ===
- Mario Cordero, 72, Costa Rican football player and coach, respiratory arrest.
- Jean-Pierre Côté, 76, Canadian politician (Lieutenant Governor of Quebec, Senator for Kennebec, Quebec).
- Albertin Disseaux, 87, Belgian racing cyclist.
- Evangelos Florakis, 59, Greek-Cypriot general, commander of the Cypriot National Guard (since 2000), helicopter crash.
- Laurence Janifer, 69, American science fiction writer.
- Walter McCrone, 86, American chemist.
- Alan Shulman, 85, American composer and cellist.
- John Wallach, 59, American journalist and author, founder of Seeds of Peace.

=== 11 ===
- Bernardas Brazdžionis, 95, Lithuanian poet.
- Rosco Gordon, 74, American blues singer and songwriter, heart attack.
- Helen Grindrod, 66, British judge, cancer.
- John Howse, 88, Australian politician.
- Garry Kelly, 54, Australian politician, suicide.
- Sun Li, 89, Chinese writer.

=== 12 ===
- Mary Carew, 88, American Olympic sprinter (1932).
- Guillermo Larco Cox, 70, Peruvian politician.
- Josefina de la Torre, 94, Spanish novelist, opera singer, and actress.
- Edward Lee Howard, 51, American CIA agent and defector, fall.
- Mani Krishnaswami, 72, Indian vocalist, cardiac arrest.
- Ghanshyambhai C. Oza, 90, Indian politician.
- Guglielmo Pesenti, 68, Italian Olympic racing cyclist (1956).
- Tim Rathbone, 69, English politician, cancer.
- Ece Ayhan Çağlar, 70, Turkish poet.

=== 13 ===
- Carey Blyton, 70, British composer and writer.
- Yousuf Karsh, 93, Canadian portrait photographer, cancer.
- Benny Peled, 74, Israeli Air Force commander, pulmonary emphysema.
- Eric Price, 83, English cricketer.
- Herbert Vesely, 71, Austrian film director and screenwriter.
- Percy Yutar, 90, South African attorney general, prosecuted Nelson Mandela.

=== 14 ===
- Igor Ansoff, 83, Russian-American economist and author, father of strategic business management, pneumonia.
- David Asseo, 88, Turkish Chief Rabbi and spiritual leader of the Republic of Turkey from 1960 to 2002.
- Joaquín Balaguer, 95, President of the Dominican Republic (1960 to 1962, 1966 to 1978, 1986 to 1996), peptic ulcer disease.
- Nelson Barrera, 44, Mexican baseball player, led the Mexican League in career home runs (455) and RBIs (1,927), electrocution.
- Nabakanta Barua, 75, Indian novelist and poet.
- Alex Fraser, 78, British-American scientist, recognized as a pioneer in evolutionary computation.
- Alphonso Gerard, 85, American baseball player.
- Fritz Glatz, 58, Austrian racing driver, traffic collision.
- Cosetta Greco, 71, Italian film actress.
- Hwang Kee, 87, Korean martial artist.
- Dick Ploog, 65, Australian Olympic cyclist (1956).
- Herm Rohrig, 84, American football player (Green Bay Packers).

=== 15 ===
- Charles R. Burton, 59, English explorer, known for being a member of the Transglobe Expedition, heart attack.
- György Fehér, 63, Hungarian film director and screenwriter.
- Lauri Honko, 70, Finnish professor of folklore studies and comparative religion.
- Camillus Perera, 64, Sri Lankan cricket umpire.
- Barbara Randolph, 60, American singer and actress, cancer.
- Philip Roth, 72, American actor.
- Pete Seibert, 77, American skier, esophageal cancer.

=== 16 ===
- John Cocke, 77, American computer scientist.
- Aleksandr Kolchinsky, 47, Soviet Ukrainian heavyweight Greco-Roman wrestler and Olympic champion (1976, 1980), heart failure.
- George Edmund Lindsay, 85, American botanist, naturalist, and museum director.
- Jack Olsen, 77, American journalist and author .
- Antonella Della Porta, 74, Italian actress.
- Floyd James Thompson, 69, United States Army colonel.

=== 17 ===
- Harry W. Gerstad, 93, American film editor.
- Romuald Halm, 84, Austrian Olympic equestrian (1956).
- Valentina Kamenyok-Vinogradova, 59, Soviet/Russian Olympic volleyball player (1964, 1968).
- Joseph Luns, 90, Dutch politician, diplomat and Secretary General of NATO (1971–1984).
- Ubiratan Pereira Maciel, 58, Brazilian basketball player and Olympian (1964).
- Lee Maye, 67, American baseball player (Milwaukee Braves, Houston Astros, Cleveland Indians, Washington Senators), cancer.
- George Rickey, 95, American kinetic sculptor.
- André Simonyi, 88, Hungarian-French football player.
- Bobby Worth, 89, American songwriter, recorded by Frank Sinatra, Bing Crosby and Ella Fitzgerald.

=== 18 ===
- Victor Emery, 68, English physicist, ALS.
- Howard Ensign Evans, 83, American entomologist.
- Qiu Huizuo, 88, Chinese Army lieutenant general.
- Raúl Ibarra, 94, Mexican Olympic sports shooter (1952, 1956, 1960, 1964).
- Andy Kirby, 40, American stock car racing driver, traffic collision.
- Györgyi Marvalics-Székely, 77, Hungarian fencer and Olympic silver medalist (1960).
- Lee Siew-Choh, 84, Singaporean politician and medical doctor, lung cancer.
- Gerhardt Sørensen, 81, Danish Olympic rower (1948).
- Owsei Temkin, 99, Russian-American medical historian.
- Metin Toker, 78, Turkish journalist and politician, prostate cancer.
- Joseph Toland, 73, American Olympic rower (1948).
- Del Wilber, 83, American baseball player (St. Louis Cardinals, Philadelphia Phillies, Boston Red Sox) and manager (Texas Rangers).
- Alexandra Zapp, 30, American murder victim.

=== 19 ===
- Jack Backman, 80, American politician.
- Dave Carter, 49, American singer-songwriter, heart attack.
- Alexander Ginzburg, 65, Soviet dissident.
- Tony Leon, 85, American football player (Washington Redskins, Brooklyn Tigers, Boston Yanks).
- Alan Lomax, 87, American documenter of blues and folk songs.
- Evdokia Petrova, 86, Soviet spy in Australia in the 1950s.
- Barry Reed, 75, American trial lawyer and author.
- Spec Shea, 81, American baseball player (New York Yankees, Washington Senators).
- Frank Taylor, 81, English sports journalist.
- Vladimir Vasyutin, 50, Soviet cosmonaut (Soyuz T-14), cancer.

=== 20 ===
- Pedro Alberto Cano Arenas, 33, Spanish footballer, cerebral hemorrhage.
- Michalis Kritikopoulos, 56, Greek footballer, cardiac arrest.
- Jan Komski, 87, Polish painter.
- Jimmy Maxwell, 85, American swing jazz trumpeter.
- Roland E. Murphy, 85, American Catholic prelate and biblical scholar.

=== 21 ===
- Giuseppe Corradi, 70, Italian footballer and Olympian (1952).
- John Cunningham, 84, British World War II nightfighter pilot.
- Millie Deegan, 82, American baseball player (AAGPBL).
- Gus Dudgeon, 59, English record producer ("Space Oddity", "Your Song", "Rocket Man", "Daniel"), traffic collision.
- Peter Elstob, 86, British soldier, adventurer, novelist and entrepreneur.
- Jeffrey Harborne, 73, British chemist and professor of botany.
- Alfred Knoll, 74, Austrian Olympic field hockey player (1952).
- Esphyr Slobodkina, 93, Russian-American artist, author, and illustrator.

=== 22 ===
- Fernando Schwalb López Aldana, 85, Peruvian politician, Prime Minister (1963–1965, 1983–1984).
- Joyce Cooper, 93, British Olympic swimmer (1928, 1932).
- Giuseppe Corradi, 70, Italian footballer.
- Viktor Mineyev, 65, Soviet-Azerbaijani modern pentathlete and Olympic Champion (1964).
- Marion Montgomery, 67, American jazz singer, lung cancer.
- Prince Ahmed bin Salman, member of the Saudi Arabian royal family.
- Vicente Sartorius, 4th Marquess of Mariño, 70, Spanish noble and Olympic bobsledder (1956).
- Salah Shehade, 49, Palestinian politician and one of the founders of Islamist movement Hamas, airstrike.
- Chuck Traynor, 64, American pornographer, heart attack.

=== 23 ===
- Gunnar Andreassen, 89, Norwegian football player and manager.
- Alberto Castillo, 87, Argentine tango singer and actor.
- Clark Gesner, 64, American composer, songwriter, author, and actor, heart attack.
- Olof Lagercrantz, 91, Swedish writer, critic, and literary scholar .
- Hermann Lindemann, 91, German football player and manager.
- Ned Martin, 78, American sportscaster, heart attack.
- Leo McKern, 82, Australian actor, diabetes.
- Paul Nicolas, 88, French Olympic boxer (1932).
- Katya Paskaleva, 56, Bulgarian film and stage actress, pancreatic cancer.
- William Luther Pierce, American neo-Nazi, author of The Turner Diaries, cancer.
- Chaim Potok, 73, American author, brain cancer.
- Idrees Sulieman, 78, American bop and hard bop trumpeter, bladder cancer.
- Arnold Weinstock, 77, British industrialist and businessman, managing director of the General Electric Company.

=== 24 ===
- Edward James Boyle Sr., 88, American district judge (United States District Court for the Eastern District of Louisiana).
- Mike Clark, 61, American gridiron football player(Philadelphia Eagles, Pittsburgh Steelers, Dallas Cowboys), heart attack.
- Pete Coscarart, 89, American baseball player (Brooklyn Dodgers, Pittsburgh Pirates).
- Maurice Denham, 92, British character actor (The Purple Plain, Sink the Bismarck!, The Day of the Jackal).
- Mustafa Mansour, 87, Egyptian football player and Olympian (1936).
- Al Silvera, 66, American baseball player (Cincinnati Redlegs).
- Gaynell Tinsley, 87, American football player (Chicago Cardinals), and coach.
- Barney White, 79, American baseball player (Brooklyn Dodgers).

=== 25 ===
- Abdel Rahman Badawi, 85, Egyptian existentialist philosopher.
- Bob Barr, 94, American baseball player (Brooklyn Dodgers).
- Frank Connell, 92, American Olympic cyclist (1932).
- Johannes Joachim Degenhardt, 76, German Roman Catholic prelate.
- Hans Dorjee, 60, Dutch football player and manager, cardiac arrest.
- Rudi Dornbusch, 60, German macroeconomist, made fundamental contributions to international economics, cancer.
- Izzy León, 91, Cuban-American baseball player (Philadelphia Phillies).
- Cliff Lewis, 79, American gridiron football player (Cleveland Browns).
- Angus Montagu, 12th Duke of Manchester, 63, British hereditary peer, heart attack.
- Louis Owens, 54, American novelist and scholar, suicide by gunshot.
- Jean Parra, 63, French Olympic boxer (1960).
- Alexander Ratiu, 86, Romanian-American priest of the Greek-Catholic Church.
- Mel Triplett, 71, American gridiron football player (New York Giants, Minnesota Vikings).

=== 26 ===
- Tony Anholt, 61, British actor (Howards' Way), brain tumor.
- Buddy Baker, 84, American film composer (The Many Adventures of Winnie the Pooh, The Apple Dumpling Gang, The Fox and the Hound).
- Kenny Gardner, 89, American singer for Guy Lombardo's band, the Royal Canadians.
- Lee Miller, 84, American actor.
- Dolores Olmedo, 93, Mexican businesswoman, philanthropist and musician.
- Kobun Chino Otogawa, 64, Japanese Sōtō Zen priest, drowned.
- André Roosenburg, 78, Dutch footballer and Olympian (1948).

=== 27 ===
- Anatoli Bashashkin, 78, Russian footballer, coach, and Olympian (1952, 1956).
- Ronald Brown, 80, British politician (member of Parliament representing Shoreditch and Finsbury and Hackney South and Shoreditch).
- Dick Cleveland, 72, American Olympic swimmer (1952).
- Frank Inn, 86, American animal trainer.
- Samuel D. Johnson Jr., 81, American circuit judge (United States Court of Appeals for the Fifth Circuit).
- Krishan Kant, 75, Indian politician, Vice President (1997 -2002), Governor of Tamil Nadu (1996–1997) and Governor of Andhra Pradesh (1990 -1997), heart attack.
- Roscoe Shelton, 70, American blues and R&B singer, cancer.

=== 28 ===
- Svetomir Belić, 55, Serbian boxer and Olympian (1972).
- Anatol Fejgin, 91, Polish communist and political police commander.
- Jack Karnehm, 85, British snooker commentator, heat stroke.
- Archer Martin, 92, British chemist, Nobel Prize laureate.
- Willie McClung, 72, American football player (Pittsburgh Steelers, Cleveland Browns, Detroit Lions).
- Jørgen Moritzen, 83, Danish Olympic weightlifter (1948, 1952).
- Donald J. Pease, 70, American politician, member of the United States House of Representatives (1977-1993).
- Steve Souchock, 83, American baseball player (New York Yankees, Chicago White Sox, Detroit Tigers).
- Hal Spindel, 89, American baseball player (St. Louis Browns, Philadelphia Phillies).
- Charles Vyt, 88, Belgian Olympic modern pentathlete (1948).
- Gerhard Wessel, 88, German intelligence officer, President of the Federal Intelligence Bureau.

=== 29 ===
- Peter Bayliss, 80, British actor (The Red Shoes, Darling, The Sweeney, Coronation Street, Lovejoy).
- Tesfamariam Bedho, 67, Eritrean Ethiopian Catholic hierarch, bishop of Keren (since 1995).
- Ad Dekkers, 48, Dutch cyclist and Olympian (1972).
- Lloyd Evans, 86, Canadian Olympic long-distance runner (1948).
- Elmar Frings, 63, German Olympic pentathlete (1964, 1968).
- Sudhir Phadke, 83, India Marathi singer-composer, brain haemorrhage.
- Renato Pirocchi, 69, Italian racing driver.
- Phil Smith, 50, American basketball player (Golden State Warriors, San Diego Clippers, Seattle SuperSonics), complications from multiple myeloma cancer.
- Ron Walotsky, 58, American science fiction and fantasy artist.

=== 30 ===
- George Alfred Barnard, 86, British statistician.
- Lyle Benjamin Borst, 89, American nuclear physicist and inventor, worked on the Manhattan Project.
- Ed Bruneteau, 82, Canadian ice hockey player (Detroit Red Wings).
- A. E. Dyson, 73, British literary critic, activist and gay rights campaigner, leukemia.
- Gerald Gunther, 75, German-American constitutional law scholar.
- Steven Lysak, 89, American sprint canoeist and Olympic champion (1948).
- Raúl Pino, 76, Chilean football manager.
- Atef Salem, 75, Egyptian film director.
- Reginald Schroeter, 80, Canadian ice hockey player and Olympian (1948).

=== 31 ===
- Boris Aleksandrov, 46, Soviet and Kazakh ice hockey player (USSR champion team for CSKA Moscow, gold medal winner at 1976 Winter Olympics), traffic collision.
- Erik Andersson, 80, Swedish Olympic decathlete (1948).
- Sir Peter Ashmore, 81, British admiral and Master of the Household to the Sovereign.
- Jerome Beatty, Jr., 85, American author of children's literature.
- Manfred Braschler, 43, Swiss footballer (FC St. Gallen, SSW Innsbruck, FC Chur), suicide by hanging.
- Raymond Brookes, Baron Brookes, 93, British industrialist and life peer.
- Slávka Budínová, 78, Czechoslovak actress.
- Pauline Chan, 29, Hong Kong actress, suicide by jumping.
- Gordon Chown, 79, Canadian lawyer and politician, member of Parliament (House of Commons representing Winnipeg South, Manitoba).
- Francis Searle, 93, English film director, writer and producer.
- Dominic Vairo, 88, American football player (Notre Dame Fighting Irish, Green Bay Packers).
