= Japan at the 2010 Asian Games (S–Z) =

- IOC code: JPN
- NOC: Japanese Olympic Committee

in Guangzhou
- Competitors: 729 in 42 sports
- Medals Ranked 3rd: Gold 48 Silver 74 Bronze 94 Total 216

Asian Games appearances (overview)
- 1951; 1954; 1958; 1962; 1966; 1970; 1974; 1978; 1982; 1986; 1990; 1994; 1998; 2002; 2006; 2010; 2014; 2018; 2022; 2026

Japan participated in the 2010 Asian Games in Guangzhou, China on 12–27 November 2010.

== Sailing ==
=== Men ===
Athlete	Event	Race												Net points	Final rank
Athlete	Event	1	2	3	4	5	6	7	8	9	10	11	12	Net points	Final rank
Makoto Tomizawa	Men's RS:X	3	1	3	4	1	4	5	5	2	5	5	(6)	38	4th
Keiju Okada	Men's Dinghy Optimist	6	3	4	3	4	6	3	5	(7)	4	2	2	41	5th
Hiroki Yamaguchi; Tetsuya Isozaki	Men's Double Handed Dinghy 420	6	4	6	6	(8)	1	1	6	3	4	4	4	45	5th
Ryunosuke Harada; Yugo Yoshida	Men's Double Handed Dinghy 470	1	1	2	(3)	1	1	1	3	1	2	2	2	17	1st place, gold medalist(s)

=== Women ===
Athlete	Event	Race												Net points	Final rank
Athlete	Event	1	2	3	4	5	6	7	8	9	10	11	12	Net points	Final rank
Eri Fukasawa	Women's Dinghy Optimist	5	5	5	6	4	(8)	7	6	4	5	4	5	56	5th
Ai Kondo; Wakako Tabata	Women's Double Handed Dinghy 470	1	1	1	1	(2)	1	1	1	1	1	1	2	12	1st place, gold medalist(s)

=== Open ===
Athlete	Event	Race												Net points	Final rank
Athlete	Event	1	2	3	4	5	6	7	8	9	10	11	12	Net points	Final rank
Hisaki Nagai	Open Laser Radial	5	5	1	1	4	2	(7)	2	6	2	3	5	36	2nd place, silver medalist(s)

Athlete	Event	Opposition	Opposition	Opposition	Opposition	Opposition	Opposition	Opposition	Total points	Rank	Semifinal	Final	Final rank
Athlete	Event	1st + 2nd Race Points	1st + 2nd Race Points	1st + 2nd Race Points	1st + 2nd Race Points	1st + 2nd Race Points	1st + 2nd Race Points	1st + 2nd Race Points	Total points	Rank	Races Points	Races Points	Final rank
Yasuhiro Okamoto; Wataru Sakamoto; Daichi Wada; Hiroaki Yoshifuji	Open Match Racing	Bahrain (BRN); 1-1	China (CHN); 1-1	Pakistan (PAK); 2-0	India (IND); 1-1	South Korea (KOR); 0-1	Singapore (SIN); 1-1	Malaysia (MAS); 2-0	8	4th	South Korea (KOR); W 3-0	India (IND); W 3-0	1st place, gold medalist(s)

== Sepaktakraw ==
=== Men's double regu ===
Team

Yuichi Matsuda
Susumu Teramoto
Takeshi Terashima

Preliminary

Group B

Pos	Team	Pld	W	L	SF	SA	SD	Pts	Qualification
1	Indonesia	3	3	0	6	0	+6	6	Semifinals
2	Japan	3	2	1	4	3	+1	4	Semifinals
3	China	3	1	2	2	5	−3	2	
4	India	3	0	3	2	6	−4	0	

Source: Results

Date		Score		Set 1	Set 2	Set 3
25 Nov	Japan	2–1	India	21–17	20–22	15–13
25 Nov	China	0–2	Japan	22–24	14–21	
26 Nov	Indonesia	2–0	Japan	21–18	21–18	

Semifinal

Date		Score		Set 1	Set 2	Set 3
26 Nov	Japan	0–2	South Korea	10–21	15–21	

=== Men's team ===
Team

Susumu Teramoto
Yuichi Matsuda
Takeshi Terashima
Yoshitaka Iida
Tomoyuki Nakatsuka
Jun Motohashi
Masahiro Yamada
Seiya Takano
Masanori Hayashi

Preliminary

Group B

Pos	Team	Pld	W	L	MF	MA	MD	Pts	Qualification
1	Malaysia	3	3	0	8	1	+7	6	Semifinals
2	Japan	3	2	1	5	4	+1	4	Semifinals
3	China	3	1	2	3	6	−3	2	
4	India	3	0	3	2	7	−5	0	

Source: Results

Date		Score		Regu 1	Regu 2	Regu 3
16 Nov	India	1–2	Japan	2–0	0–2	0–2
17 Nov	Malaysia	3–0	Japan	2–0	2–0	2–0
18 Nov	Japan	3–0	China	2–1	2–0	2–1

Semifinal

Date		Score		Regu 1	Regu 2	Regu 3
19 Nov	Thailand	1–2	Japan	2–0	2-0	

=== Women's double regu ===
Team

Sawa Aoki
Yukie Sato
Chiharu Yano

Preliminary

Group B

Pos	Team	Pld	W	L	SF	SA	SD	Pts	Qualification
1	Japan	2	2	0	4	0	+4	4	Semifinals
2	South Korea	2	1	1	2	3	−1	2	Semifinals
3	Indonesia	2	0	2	1	4	−3	0	

Source: Results

Date		Score		Set 1	Set 2	Set 3
26 Nov	Japan	2–0	South Korea	21–17	21–19	
26 Nov	Japan	2–0	Indonesia	21–17	21–18	

Semifinal

Date		Score		Set 1	Set 2	Set 3
26 Nov	Japan	0–2	China	11–21	18–21	

=== Women's team ===
Team

Sawa Aoki
Yukie Sato
Chiharu Yano
Satomi Ishihara
Yumi Ishino
Aika Kameoka
Azusa Kawai
Azusa Masuko
Yuka Watanabe Preliminary

Group A

Pos	Team	Pld	W	L	MF	MA	MD	Pts	Qualification
1	Indonesia	2	2	0	5	1	+4	4	Semifinals
2	Vietnam	2	1	1	4	2	+2	2	Semifinals
3	Japan	2	0	2	0	6	−6	0	

Source: Results

Date		Score		Regu 1	Regu 2	Regu 3
16 Nov	Indonesia	3–0	Japan	2–0	2–0	2–0
16 Nov	Vietnam	3–0	Japan	2–0	2–0	2–0

== Shooting ==
Men

Event	Athlete	Qualification		Final	
Event	Athlete	Score	Rank	Score	Rank
Men's 10 m air pistol	Tomoyuki Matsuda	577-20x	13th	Did not advance	
Men's 10 m air pistol	Kojiro Horimizu	575-19x	16th	Did not advance	
Men's 10 m air pistol	Susumu Kobayashi	572-15x	22nd	Did not advance	
Men's 10 m air pistol team	Tomoyuki Matsuda; Kojiro Horimizu; Susumu Kobayashi			1724-54x	3rd place, bronze medalist(s)
Men's 10 m air rifle	Toshikazu Yamashita	593-40x QS-Off 51.9	8th Q	693.9	8th
Men's 10 m air rifle	Midori Yajima	587-38x	19th	Did not advance	
Men's 25 m rapid fire pistol	Teruyoshi Akiyama	579-14x QS-Off 47	5th	773.5	6th
Men's 25 m center fire pistol	Kojiro Horimizu			578-14x	13th
Men's 25 m center fire pistol	Teruyoshi Akiyama			574-14x	21st
Men's 25 m center fire pistol	Susumu Kobayashi			572-16x	24th
Men's 25 m center fire pistol team	Kojiro Horimizu; Teruyoshi Akiyama; Susumu Kobayashi			1724-44x	6th
Men's 50 m pistol	Tomoyuki Matsuda	556- 4x	8th Q	653.7	3rd place, bronze medalist(s)
Men's 50 m pistol	Kojiro Horimizu	556-12x	7th Q	649.6	6th
Men's 50 m pistol	Susumu Kobayashi	555- 9x	9th	Did not advance	
Men's 50 m pistol team	Tomoyuki Matsuda; Kojiro Horimizu; Susumu Kobayashi			1667-25x	3rd place, bronze medalist(s)
Men's 50 m rifle prone	Midori Yajima	591-35x	10th	Did not advance	
Men's 50 m rifle prone	Toshikazu Yamashita	588-31x	22nd	Did not advance	
Men's 50 m rifle three positions	Midori Yajima	1165-50x	3rd Q	1259.5	5th
Men's 50 m rifle three positions	Toshikazu Yamashita	1154-50x	10th	Did not advance	

Women

Event	Athlete	Qualification		Final	
Event	Athlete	Score	Rank	Score	Rank
Women's 10 m air pistol	Kinuko Sato	379- 5x	15th	Did not advance	
Women's 10 m air pistol	Yukari Mori	372- 7x	31st	Did not advance	
Women's 10 m air pistol	Yoko Inada	372- 7x	32nd	Did not advance	
Women's 10 m air pistol team	Kinuko Sato; Yukari Mori; Yoko Inada			1123-23x	8th
Women's 10 m air rifle	Maki Konomoto	395-30x	13th	Did not advance	
Women's 10 m air rifle	Seiko Iwata	391-27x	25th	Did not advance	
Women's 10 m air rifle	Yuka Nakamura	391-22x	26th	Did not advance	
Women's 10 m air rifle team	Maki Konomoto; Seiko Iwata; Yuka Nakamura			1177-79x	6th
Women's 25 m pistol	Yukari Mori	587-25x	1st Q	784.8	2nd place, silver medalist(s)
Women's 25 m pistol	Yoko Inada	571-17x	22nd	Did not advance	
Women's 25 m pistol	Kinuko Sato	563-19x	30th	Did not advance	
Women's 25 m pistol team	Yukari Mori; Yoko Inada; Kinuko Sato			1721-61x	4th
Women's 50 m rifle prone	Seiko Iwata			592-38x	3rd place, bronze medalist(s)
Women's 50 m rifle prone	Yuka Nakamura			584-28x	19th
Women's 50 m rifle prone	Maki Konomoto			576-22x	40th
Women's 50 m rifle prone team	Seiko Iwata; Yuka Nakamura; Maki Konomoto			1752-88x	6th
Women's 50 m rifle three positions	Maki Konomoto	578-24x	4th Q	678.0	4th
Women's 50 m rifle three positions	Seiko Iwata	570-23x	19th	Did not advance	
Women's 50 m rifle three positions	Yuka Nakamura	563-22x	28th	Did not advance	
Women's 50 m rifle three positions team	Seiko Iwata; Yuka Nakamura; Maki Konomoto			1711-81x	5th
Women's Trap	Yukie Nakayama	71	1st Q	89	1st place, gold medalist(s)
Women's Trap	Keiko Suzu	58	19th	Did not advance	

== Soft Tennis ==
Athlete	Event	Round Group			1st Round	Quarterfinals	Semifinals	Final
Athlete	Event	Match 1	Match 2	Match 3	1st Round	Quarterfinals	Semifinals	Final
Athlete	Event	Opposition Result	Opposition Result	Opposition Result	Opposition Result	Opposition Result	Opposition Result	Opposition Result
Hidenori Shinohara	Men´s Singles	Donedy Keodalasouk (LAO); W 4-0 (4-0, 8-6, 4-1, 4-0)	Chen Mingdong (CHN); L 1-4 (1-4, 4-1, 2-4, 3-5, 3-5)		Lee Yo-Han (KOR); L 1-4 (5-3, 0-4, 1-4, 2-4, 6-8)	Did not advance		
Keiya Nakamoto	Men´s Singles	Joseph Arcilla (PHI); W 4-2 (4-1, 4-1, 6-4, 4-6, 3-5, 4-0)	Uchirsaikhan Bayasgalant (MGL); W 4-0 (4-2, 5-3, 4-2, 4-2)	Bae Hwan-Sung (KOR); W 4-3 (4-6, 4-2, 1-4, 4-1, 4-1, 2-4, 8-6)	BYE	Radnaabazaryn Bayartogtokh (MGL); W 4-0 (4-0, 4-2, 4-1, 5-3)	Lee Yo-Han (KOR); L 3-4 (5-3, 4-2, 2-4, 4-2, 1-4, 5-7, 2-7) (bronze)	Did not advance
Koji Kobayashi; Hidenori Shinohara	Men´s Doubles	Ananda Khamphoumy (LAO) and Anandone Khamphoumy (LAO); W 5-0 (4-0, 4-0, 4-0, 4-0, 4-1)	Jiao Yang (CHN) and Shi Bo (CHN); W 5-2 (4-1, 4-2, 5-3, 5-7, 4-1, 1-4, 5-3)		Chai Jin (CHN) and Li Xiang (CHN); W 5-0 (4-1, 4-0, 4-0, 4-1, 4-1)	Ji Yong-Min (KOR) and Lee Yeon (KOR); W 5-3 (4-2, 5-3, 2-4, 4-2, 5-7, 4-1, 3-5, 4-2)	Li Chia-hung (TPE) and Yang Sheng-fa (TPE); L 3-5 (6-4, 3-5, 4-2, 4-2, 1-4, 3-5, 3-5, 3-5) (bronze)	Did not advance
Shigeo Nakahori; Tsuneo Takagawa	Men´s Doubles	Donedy Keodalasouk (LAO) and Bounthavong Sirisak (LAO); W 5-1 (4-1, 4-1, 4-2, 4-1, 2-4, 4-2)	Chai Jin (CHN) and Li Xiang (CHN); W 5-1 (4-2, 4-0, 5-7, 4-1, 4-2, 4-0)		BYE	Jiao Yang (CHN) and Shi Bo (CHN); W 5-2 (2-4, 6-4, 4-0, 5-3, 2-4, 4-2, 4-2)	Bae Hwan-Sung (KOR) and Kim Tae-Jung (KOR); L 0-5 (3-5, 1-4, 2-4, 3-5, 1-4) (bronze)	Did not advance
Shigeo Nakahori; Tsuneo Takagawa; Keiya Nakamoto; Koji Kobayashi; Hidenori Shinohara	Men´s Team	Laos (LAO); W 3-0 (5-1, 4-0, 5-0)	China (CHN); W 2-1 (5-2, 3-4, 5-0)	Mongolia (MGL); W 3-0 (5-4, 4-1, 5-2)			South Korea (KOR); W 2-1 (5-3, 3-4, 5-4)	Chinese Taipei (TPE); L 1-2 (5-2, 3-4, 4-5) (silver)
Ayaka Oba	Women´s Singles	Taruka Srivastav (IND); W 4-0 (4-0, 4-2, 4-1, 4-2)	Dash Tsetsenbayar (MGL); W 4-0 (4-1, 4-1, 4-1, 4-1)	Gao Tong (CHN); W 4-0 (4-2, 5-3, 4-2, 4-2)	BYE	Kim Ae-Kyung (KOR); L 1-4 (4-0, 1-4, 2-4, 3-5, 1-4)	Did not advance	
Eri Uehara	Women´s Singles	Ri Nam-Hui (PRK); W 4-2 (4-6, 4-2, 6-4, 2-4, 4-2, 7-5)	Kim Kyung-Ryun (KOR); L 1-4 (5-7, 1-4, 4-6, 4-1, 1-4)		Chang Wen-hsin (TPE); W 4-1 (4-2, 5-3, 1-4, 4-0, 8-6)	Chiang Wan-chi (TPE); L 2-4 (4-1, 2-4, 2-4, 5-3, 2-4, 3-5)	Did not advance	
Ayaka Oba; Mai Sasaki	Women´s Doubles	Priyanka Bugade (IND) and Samia Rizvi (IND); W 5-0 (4-1, 4-0, 4-0, 4-1, 4-0)	Xin Yani (CHN) and Zhao Lei (CHN); L 1-5 (1-4, 0-4, 3-5, 2-4, 4-2, 1-4)	Bulgan Norovsuren (MGL) and Dagiidamba Naranjargal (MGL); W 5-0 (4-0, 5-3, 4-0, 4-1, 4-1)		Cheng Chu-ling (TPE) and Chu Yun-hsuan (TPE); W 5-4 (2-4, 4-1, 1-4, 2-4, 2-4, 4-1, 4-2, 4-0, 7-4)	Joo Og (KOR) and Kim Ae-Kyung (KOR); L 1-5 (6-8, 6-4, 2-4, 2-4, 2-4, 7-9) (bronze)	Did not advance
Hitomi Sugimoto; Eri Uehara	Women´s Doubles	Jo Yong-Sim (PRK) and Ri Nam-Hui (PRK); W 5-2 (5-3, 4-1, 3-5, 7-5, 4-1, 0-4, 8-6)	Deena Cruz (PHI) and Samia Rizvi (PHI); W 5-0 (4-0, 4-1, 4-2, 4-2, 4-2)	Cheng Chu-ling (TPE) and Chu Yun-hsuan (TPE); L 4-5 (2-4, 4-1, 3-5, 4-1, 5-3, 2-4, 1-4, 4-1, 9-11)		Kwon Ran-Hee (KOR) and Park Soon-Joung (KOR); W 5-0 (5-3, 6-4, 4-0, 4-1, 4-1)	Xin Yani (CHN) and Zhao Lei (CHN); W 5-2 (5-3, 3-5, 3-5, 6-4, 4-1, 4-0, 6-4)	Joo Og (KOR) and Kim Ae-Kyung (KOR); W 5-3 (4-2, 1-4, 1-4, 1-4, 4-2, 4-1, 4-1, 4-2) (gold)
Kana Morihara; Hitomi Sugimoto; Eri Uehara; Ayaka Oba; Mai Sasaki	Women´s Team	Philippines (PHI); W 3-0 (5-1, 4-1, 5-0)	North Korea (PRK); W 3-0 (5-0, 4-1, 5-1)	Chinese Taipei (TPE); W 2-1 (5-3, 1-4, 5-1)			China (CHN); W 2-1 (5-2, 1-4, 5-3)	Chinese Taipei (TPE); W 2-1 (5-2, 0-4, 5-2) (gold)
Hidenori Shinohara; Mai Sasaki	Mixed Doubles				Jitender Singh Mehlda (IND) and Monica Menon (IND); W 5-0 (5-3, 4-0, 5-3, 4-1, 4-1)	Li Chia-hung (TPE) and Cheng Chu-ling (TPE); L 4-5 (2-4, 4-1, 4-1, 4-6, 2-4, 0-4, 4-2, 4-2, 0-7)	Did not advance	
Keiya Nakamoto; Hitomi Sugimoto	Mixed Doubles				Jhomar Arcilla (PHI) and Josephine Paguyo (PHI); W 5-0 (4-1, 5-3, 4-1, 4-2, 4-0)	Liu Chia-lun (TPE) and Hang Chia-ling (TPE); L 3-5 (0-4, 2-4, 4-2, 4-2, 4-1, 3-5, 2-4, 2-4)	Did not advance	

== Softball ==
=== Women ===
Team

Yukiyo Mine
Rei Nishiyama
Ayumi Karino
Haruna Sakamoto
Shizuyo Hamamoto
Misato Kawano
Emi Matsuoka
Eri Yamada
Sayuri Yamane
Mika Someya
Naoko Matsumoto
Yukiko Ueno
Makiko Fujiwara
Satoko Mabuchi
Maki Tanigawa

Preliminaries

Team	Pld	W	L	RF	RA
Chinese Taipei	5	5	0	26	7
Japan	5	4	1	35	3
China	5	3	2	24	9
South Korea	5	2	3	13	14
Philippines	5	1	4	7	24
Thailand	5	0	5	2	40

November 19 13:00 at Tianhe Softball Field, Guangzhou
Team	1	2	3	4	5	6	7	R	H	E
Thailand	0	0	0	X	X	X	X	0	0	6
Japan	9	4	2	X	X	X	X	15	12	0
WP: Makiko Fujiwara LP: Parima Phandakari

November 20 18:00 at Tianhe Softball Field, Guangzhou
Team	1	2	3	4	5	6	7	R	H	E
South Korea	0	0	0	0	0	0	0	0	1	0
Japan	0	0	0	1	0	2	X	3	7	0
WP: Mika Someya LP: Lim Mi-Ran; Home runs: KOR: None; JPN: Ayumi Karino (1)

November 21 15:30 at Tianhe Softball Field, Guangzhou
Team	1	2	3	4	5	6	7	R	H	E
Japan	0	0	0	0	0	0	1	1	6	0
Chinese Taipei	2	0	0	0	0	0	X	2	3	1
WP: Chung Hui-lin LP: Yukiko Ueno; Home runs: JPN: None; TPE: Chiang Hui-chuan (1)

November 22 13:00 at Tianhe Softball Field, Guangzhou
Team	1	2	3	4	5	6	7	R	H	E
Philippines	0	0	0	0	0	0	0	0	1	1
Japan	2	0	1	1	0	0	X	4	11	0
WP: Sayuri Yamane LP: Corazon Sobere

November 23 15:30 at Tianhe Softball Field, Guangzhou
Team	1	2	3	4	5	6	7	R	H	E
Japan	1	0	0	1	0	0	0	2	6	2
China	1	0	0	0	0	0	0	1	3	2
WP: Yukiko Ueno LP: Li Qi

Semifinals

November 25 16:00 at Tianhe Softball Field, Guangzhou
Team	1	2	3	4	5	6	7	R	H	E
Japan	0	0	0	0	5	0	0	5	9	0
Chinese Taipei	0	0	0	1	0	0	1	2	4	1
WP: Yukiko Ueno LP: Chueh Ming-hui; Home runs: JPN: None; TPE: Chiang Hui-chuan (1)

Grand final

November 26 18:30 at Tianhe Softball Field, Guangzhou
Team	1	2	3	4	5	6	7	R	H	E
Japan	0	0	0	1	0	1	0	2	7	1
China	0	0	0	0	0	0	0	0	1	0
WP: Yukiko Ueno LP: Wang Lan

== Squash ==
Athlete	Event	1st Round	2nd Round	Quarterfinals	Semifinals	Final
Athlete	Event	Opposition Result	Opposition Result	Opposition Result	Opposition Result	Opposition Result
Shinnosuke Tsuke	Men's singles	Gihan Suwaris (SRI); W 3-0 (11-5, 11-3, 11-9)	Farhan Mehboob (PAK); L 0-3 (7-11, 5-11, 4-11)	Did not advance		
Yuta Fukui	Men's singles	Mohammed Al-Saif (KSA); W 3-0 (11-3, 11-1, 11-2)	Ong Beng Hee (MAS); L 0-3 (2-11, 7-11, 5-11)	Did not advance		
Chinatsu Matsui	Women's singles		Low Wee Wern (MAS); L 0-3 (10-12, 4-11, 8-11)	Did not advance		
Misaki Kobayashi	Women's singles		Yvonne Dalida (PHI); W 3-0 (11-6, 11-4, 11-4)	Annie Au (HKG); L 1-3 (3-11, 8-11, 12-10, 6-11)	Did not advance	

Athlete	Event	Pool Summary					Semifinals	Final
Athlete	Event	Contest 1	Contest 2	Contest 3	Contest 4	Contest 5	Semifinals	Final
Athlete	Event	Opposition Result	Opposition Result	Opposition Result	Opposition Result	Opposition Result	Opposition Result	Opposition Result
Yuta Fukui; Takanori Shimizu; Shinnosuke Tsuke	Men´s Team	South Korea (KOR); W 2-1 (3-0, 3-0, 0-3)	India (IND); L 0-3 (0-3, 0-3, 0-3)	Qatar (QAT); W 3-0 (3-0, 3-0, 3-2)	Malaysia (MAS); L 0-3 (0-3, 0-3, 0-3)	Saudi Arabia (KSA); W 3-0 (3-0, 3-0, 3-0)	Did not advance	
Misaki Kobayashi; Chinatsu Matsui; Miwa Maekawa	Women´s Team	South Korea (KOR); L 1-2 (3-0, 2-3, 2-3)	Malaysia (MAS); L 0-3 (0-3, 1-3, 0-3)				Did not advance	

== Swimming ==
Men

Event	Athletes	Heat		Final	
Event	Athletes	Time	Rank	Time	Rank
50 m freestyle	Rammaru Harada	22.71	2nd Q	22.84	3rd place, bronze medalist(s)
50 m freestyle	Masayuki Kishida	22.86	3rd Q	22.45	2nd place, silver medalist(s)
100 m freestyle	Takuro Fujii	50.27	3rd Q	49.37	3rd place, bronze medalist(s)
100 m freestyle	Sho Uchida	50.50	5th Q	50.07	5th
200 m freestyle	Yuki Kobori	1:49.61	4th Q	1:48.15	5th
200 m freestyle	Takeshi Matsuda	1:50.20	5th Q	1:47.73	3rd place, bronze medalist(s)
400 m freestyle	Takeshi Matsuda	3:55.02	3rd Q	3:51.65	4th
400 m freestyle	Sho Uchida	3:55.70	4th Q	3:53.42	5th
1500 m freestyle	Sho Uchida			15:52.29	5th
50 m backstroke	Junya Koga	25.42	1st Q	25.08	1st place, gold medalist(s)
50 m backstroke	Ryosuke Irie	25.67	2nd Q	25.16	2nd place, silver medalist(s)
100 m backstroke	Junya Koga	54.45	1st Q	53.88	2nd place, silver medalist(s)
100 m backstroke	Ryosuke Irie	55.57	2nd Q	53.61	1st place, gold medalist(s)
200 m backstroke	Ryosuke Irie	1:59.78	1st Q	1:55.45	1st place, gold medalist(s)
50 m breaststroke	Ryo Tateishi	28.20	3rd Q	27.86	2nd place, silver medalist(s)
50 m breaststroke	Kosuke Kitajima	28.38	5th Q	28.15	5th
100 m breaststroke	Ryo Tateishi	1:02.27	2nd Q	1:00.38	1st place, gold medalist(s)
100 m breaststroke	Kosuke Kitajima	1:02.35	3rd Q	1:01.85	4th
200 m breaststroke	Naoya Tomita	2:16.06	5th Q	2:10.36	1st place, gold medalist(s)
50 m butterfly	Masayuki Kishida	24.49	4th Q	24.13	2nd place, silver medalist(s)
50 m butterfly	Rammaru Harada	24.61	6th Q	24.51	6th
100 m butterfly	Takuro Fujii	52.85	1st Q	51.85	2nd place, silver medalist(s)
100 m butterfly	Masayuki Kishida	53.83	4th Q	52.93	4th
200 m butterfly	Takeshi Matsuda	1:58.27	2nd Q	1:54.02	1st place, gold medalist(s)
200 m butterfly	Ryusuke Sakata	1:58.47	4th Q	1:55.23	2nd place, silver medalist(s)
200 m individual medley	Ken Takakuwa	2:01.80	1st Q	1:58.31	1st place, gold medalist(s)
200 m individual medley	Yuya Horihata	2:04.71	4th Q	2:00.48	3rd place, bronze medalist(s)
400 m individual medley	Ken Takakuwa	4:24.02	4th Q	4:16.42	3rd place, bronze medalist(s)
400 m individual medley	Yuya Horihata	4:22.18	2nd Q	4:13.35	1st place, gold medalist(s)
4×100 m freestyle	Takuro Fujii; Rammaru Harada; Shunsuke Kuzuhara; Sho Uchida; Yuki Kobori*; Yoshihiro Okumura*	3:19.11	2nd Q	3:16.78	2nd place, silver medalist(s)
4×200 m freestyle	Yuki Kobori; Sho Uchida; Shunsuke Kuzuhara; Takeshi Matsuda; Yoshihiro Okumura*	7:15.57	1st Q	7:10.39	2nd place, silver medalist(s)
4×100 m medley	Ryosuke Irie; Takuro Fujii; Ryo Tateishi; Rammaru Harada; Kosuke Kitajima*; Shunsuke Kuzuhara*; Masayuki Kishida*	3:40.78	1st Q	3:34.10	1st place, gold medalist(s)

* Participated in the heats only.

Women

Event	Athletes	Heat		Final	
Event	Athletes	Time	Rank	Time	Rank
50 m freestyle	Yayoi Matsumoto	25.75	3rd Q	25.67	3rd place, bronze medalist(s)
50 m freestyle	Tomoko Hagiwara	25.86	5th Q	26.04	5th
100 m freestyle	Haruka Ueda	55.47	2nd Q	55.15	3rd place, bronze medalist(s)
100 m freestyle	Yayoi Matsumoto	56.33	5th Q	55.78	5th
200 m freestyle	Haruka Ueda	2:00.03	2nd Q	1:59.42	4th
200 m freestyle	Hanae Ito	2:00.72	3rd Q	1:58.24	3rd place, bronze medalist(s)
400 m freestyle	Maiko Fujino	4:19.44	4th Q	4:15.17	4th
800 m freestyle	Maiko Fujino			8:33.55	3rd place, bronze medalist(s)
50 m backstroke	Aya Terakawa	28.47	3rd Q	27.86	2nd place, silver medalist(s)
50 m backstroke	Shiho Sakai	28.62	4th Q	28.17	4th
100 m backstroke	Aya Terakawa	1:01.58	2nd Q	59.92	4th
100 m backstroke	Shiho Sakai	1:00.42	1st Q	59.87	2nd place, silver medalist(s)
200 m backstroke	Aya Terakawa	2:14.28	4th Q	2:09.72	3rd place, bronze medalist(s)
200 m backstroke	Shiho Sakai	2:09.68	1st Q	2:07.81	2nd place, silver medalist(s)
50 m breaststroke	Satomi Suzuki	32.12	3rd Q	31.52	3rd place, bronze medalist(s)
50 m breaststroke	Rie Kaneto	33.11	8th Q	32.85	7th
100 m breaststroke	Satomi Suzuki	1:09.23	1st Q	1:07.43	2nd place, silver medalist(s)
100 m breaststroke	Rie Kaneto	1:10.51	5th Q	1:09.66	5th
200 m breaststroke	Satomi Suzuki	2:30.45	4th Q	2:25.68	5th
200 m breaststroke	Rie Kaneto	2:28.36	2nd Q	2:25.63	4th
50 m butterfly	Yuka Kato	26.59	3rd Q	26.27 NR	2nd place, silver medalist(s)
50 m butterfly	Natsumi Hoshi	27.84	8th Q	27.93	8th
100 m butterfly	Yuka Kato	58.61	1st Q	58.46	3rd place, bronze medalist(s)
100 m butterfly	Natsumi Hoshi	59.90	7th Q	59.87	6th
200 m butterfly	Yuka Kato	2:13.79	6th Q	2:09.82	4th
200 m butterfly	Natsumi Hoshi	2:09.94	2nd Q	2:07.96	2nd place, silver medalist(s)
200 m individual medley	Izumi Kato	2:17.66	5th Q	2:14.64	4th
200 m individual medley	Maiko Fujino	2:18.84	7th Q	2:16.22	6th
400 m individual medley	Izumi Kato	4:44.72	2nd Q	4:46.02	5th
400 m individual medley	Maiko Fujino	4:45.67	4th Q	4:42.31	5th
4×100 m freestyle	Haruka Ueda; Yayoi Matsumoto; Tomoko Hagiwara; Hanae Ito			3:37.90	2nd place, silver medalist(s)
4×200 m freestyle	Hanae Ito; Haruka Ueda; Yayoi Matsumoto; Risa Sekine			7:55.92	2nd place, silver medalist(s)
4×100 m medley	Aya Terakawa; Satomi Susuki; Yuka Kato; Haruka Ueda			3:58.24	2nd place, silver medalist(s)

== Synchronized swimming ==
Athlete	Event	Technical Routine		Free Routine		Total	
Athlete	Event	Points	Rank	Points	Rank	Points	Rank
Yukiko Inui; Chisa Kobayashi	Women's Duet	93.375	2nd	93.500	2nd	186.875	2nd place, silver medalist(s)
Yumi Adachi, Miho Arai, Aika Hakoyama, Yukiko Inui, Mayo Itoyama, Chisa Kobayashi, Mai Nakamura, Misa Sugiyama, Yui Ueminami, Kurumi Yoshida	Women's Team	92.750	2nd	93.375	2nd	186.125	2nd place, silver medalist(s)
Yumi Adachi, Miho Arai, Aika Hakoyama, Yukiko Inui, Mayo Itoyama, Chisa Kobayashi, Mai Nakamura, Misa Sugiyama, Yui Ueminami, Kurumi Yoshida	Women's Combination					94.000	2nd place, silver medalist(s)

== Table Tennis ==
Athlete	Event	Round of 64	Round of 32	Round of 16	Quarterfinals	Semifinals	Final
Athlete	Event	Opposition Result	Opposition Result	Opposition Result	Opposition Result	Opposition Result	Opposition Result
Jun Mizutani	Men's singles	BYE	Lkhagvadorjyn Altantulga (MGL); W 4-0 (11-2, 11-6, 11-1, 11-8)	Li Ching (HKG); W 4-2 (11-7, 11-5, 7-11, 11-4, 6-11, 11-8)	Gao Ning (SIN); W 4-2 (8-11, 11-2, 8-11, 11-8, 15-13, 12-10)	Wang Hao (CHN); L 0-4 (10-12, 4-11, 4-11, 5-11) (bronze)	Did not advance
Kenta Matsudaira	Men's singles	BYE	Chang Hoi Wa (MAC); W 4-0 (11-7, 11-4, 11-5, 11-4)	Ma Long (CHN); L 2-4 (9-11, 11-8, 11-8, 8-11, 9-11, 4-11)	Did not advance		
Seiya Kishikawa; Jun Mizutani	Men's Doubles		Chuang Chih-yuan (TPE) and Wu Chih-chi (TPE); L 2-3 (11-9, 11-8, 10-12, 6-11, 10-12)	Did not advance			
Kenta Matsudaira; Koki Niwa	Men's Doubles		Kim Chol-jin (PRK) and Kim Hyok-Bong (PRK); W 3-1 (11-13, 11-9, 11-3, 11-7)	Jiang Tianyi (HKG) and Tang Peng (HKG); W 3-0 (12-10, 11-6, 11-8)	Lee Jung-Woo (KOR) and Oh Sang-Eun (KOR); W 3-2 (3-11, 11-7, 11-5, 16-18, 11-7)	Ma Lin (CHN) and Xu Xin (CHN); L 1-4 (6-11, 11-8, 6-11, 6-11, 5-11) (bronze)	Did not advance
Sayaka Hirano	Women's singles	BYE	Shamini Kumaresan (IND); W 4-2 (11-7, 11-5, 7-11, 11-7, 7-11, 11-7)	Tie Ya Na (HKG); W 4-0 (11-8, 11-5, 11-6, 12-10)	Kim Kyung-Ah (KOR); L 0-4 (9-11, 6-11, 9-11, 5-11)	Did not advance	
Ai Fukuhara	Women's singles	BYE	Olga Kim (UZB); W 4-0 (11-6, 11-4, 11-2, 11-5)	Huang Yi-hua (TPE); W 4-0 (11-8, 11-8, 11-8, 11-5)	Wang Yuegu (SIN); W 4-2 (7-11, 11-8, 11-3, 9-11, 12-10, 13-11)	Guo Yue (CHN); L 3-4 (11-5, 12-10, 8-11, 11-9, 9-11, 8-11, 8-11) (bronze)	Did not advance
Ai Fukuhara; Kasumi Ishikawa	Women's Doubles		Luong Thi Tam (VIE) and Pham Thi Thien Kim (VIE); W 3-0 (11-3, 11-7, 11-3)	Suthasini Sawettabut (THA) and Tidaporn Vongboon (THA); W 3-1 (11-2, 8-11, 11-6, 11-6)	Kim Kyung-Ah (KOR) and Park Mi-Young (KOR); W 3-1 (11-7, 4-11, 11-7, 14-12)	Ding Ning (CHN) and Liu Shiwen (CHN); L 0-4 (8-11, 8-11, 5-11, 7-11) (bronze)	Did not advance
Hiroko Fujii; Misako Wakamiya	Women's Doubles		Jiang Huajun (HKG) and Tie Ya Na (HKG); W 3-2 (4-11, 11-9, 11-9, 6-11, 13-11)	Nanthana Komwong (THA) and Anisara Muangsuk (THA); W 3-0 (11-0, 11-5, 11-5)	Feng Tianwei (SIN) and Wang Yuegu (SIN); W 3-0 (12-10, 11-6, 11-8)	Guo Yue (CHN) and Li Xiaoxia (CHN); L 1-4 (3-11, 1-11, 13-11, 2-11, 7-11) (bronze)	Did not advance
Seiya Iishikawa; Ai Fukuhara	Mixed Doubles		Kim Hyok-Bong (PRK) and Kim Jong (PRK); W 3-2 (11-5, 5-11, 11-8, 4-11, 11-3)	Sharath Kamal (IND) and Shamini Kumaresan (IND); W 3-2 (10-12, 11-4, 8-11, 11-2, 11-6)	Wu Chih-chi (TPE) and Cheng I-ching (TPE); W 3-0 (11-6, 11-7, 11-6)	Cheung Yuk (HKG) and Jiang Huajun (HKG); L 3-4 (6-11, 5-11, 11-5, 3-11, 11-2, 14-12, 9-11) (bronze)	Did not advance
Kenta Matsudaira; Kasumi Ishikawa	Mixed Doubles		Joo Se-Hyuk (KOR) and Kim Kyung-Ah (KOR); W 3-0 (11-6, 12-10, 11-9)	Leong Kin Wa (MAC) and Cheong Cheng I (MAC); W 3-0 (11-4, 11-2, 11-4)	Ri Chol-Guk (PRK) and Kim Hye-Song (PRK); W 3-0 (11-4, 11-6, 11-7)	Xu Xin (CHN) and Guo Yan (CHN); L 0-4 (8-11, 5-11, 8-11,6-11) (bronze)	Did not advance

Athlete	Event	Pool Summary			Quarterfinals	Semifinals	Final
Athlete	Event	Contest 1	Contest 2	Contest 3	Quarterfinals	Semifinals	Final
Athlete	Event	Opposition Result	Opposition Result	Opposition Result	Opposition Result	Opposition Result	
Kaii Yoshida; Seiya Kishikawa; Jun Mizutani; Kenta Matsudaira; Koki Niwa	Men´s Team	Nepal (NEP); W 3-0 (3-0, 3-0, 3-0)	Hong Kong (HKG); W 3-2 (1-3, 3-0, 1-3, 3-2, 3-2)	Iran (IRI); W 3-0 (3-0, 3-2, 3-2)	India (IND); W 3-1 (0-3, 3-0, 3-1, 3-1)	China (CHN); L 0-3 (1-3, 0-3, 1-3) (bronze)	Did not advance
Sayaka Hirano; Ai Fukuhara; Kasumi Ishikawa; Hiroko Fujii; Misako Wakamiya	Men´s Team	Tajikistan (TJK); W 3-0 (3-0, 3-0, 3-0)	China (CHN); L 0-3 (0-3, 0-3, 0-3)	Chinese Taipei (TPE); W 3-1 (3-1, 1-3, 3-1, 3-2)	Singapore (SIN); L 2-3 (3-1, 0-3, 3-2, 1-3, 2-3)	Did not advance	

== Taekwondo ==
=== Men ===
Athlete	Event	Round of 32	Round of 16	Quarterfinals	Semifinals	Final
Athlete	Event	Opposition Result	Opposition Result	Opposition Result	Opposition Result	Opposition Result
Takaya Nakagawa	Finweight (-54kg)	Chutchawal Khawlao (THA); L PTS 3-5	Did not advance			
Yuki Mitsuhash	Bantamweight (-63kg)	BYE	Khalid Al-Zaid (KUW); W PTS 7-5	Nacha Punthong (THA); L PTS 4-5	Did not advance	
Yoshihiro Nagano	Welterweight (-80kg)	Nabil Talal (JOR); L PTS 0-14	Did not advance			

=== Women ===
Athlete	Event	Round of 32	Round of 16	Quarterfinals	Semifinals	Final
Athlete	Event	Opposition Result	Opposition Result	Opposition Result	Opposition Result	Opposition Result
Erika Kasahara	Flyweight (-49kg)		BYE	Luisa dos Santos (TLS); W RSC Round2 2:00	Vu Thi Hau (VIE); W PTS 5-0	Wu Jingyu (CHN); L PTS 1-13 (silver)

== Tennis ==
Athlete	Event	Round of 64	Round of 32	Round of 16	Quarterfinals	Semifinals	Final
Athlete	Event	Opposition Result	Opposition Result	Opposition Result	Opposition Result	Opposition Result	Opposition Result
Go Soeda	Men's singles	BYE	Aqeel Khan (PAK); W 6-2, 6-4	Cecil Mamiit (PHI); W 4-6, 6-4, 6-3	Wu Di (CHN); W 6-2, 6-3	Denis Istomin (UZB); L 1-6, 0-6 (bronze)	Did not advance
Tatsuma Ito	Men's singles	BYE	Thangarajah Dineshkanthan (SRI); W 6-2, 6-2	Treat Conrad Huey (PHI); W 6-4, 6-4	Danai Udomchoke (THA); W 6-4, 6-1	Somdev Devvarman (IND); L 2-6, 6-0, 3-6 (bronze)	Did not advance
Hiroki Kondo; Go Soeda	Men's doubles		BYE	Treat Conrad Huey (PHI) and Cecil Mamiit (PHI); L 6-4, 6(0)-7, [6-10]	Did not advance		
Toshihide Matsui; Takao Suzuki	Men's doubles		Jae Cho-soong (KOR) and Kim Hyun Joon (KOR); L 3-6, 6-3, [7-10]	Did not advance			
Tatsuma Ito; Toshihide Matsui; Takao Suzuki; Go Soeda	Men's team		BYE	Hong Kong (HKG); W 3-0 (2-1, 2-0, 2-0)	China (CHN); W 2-1 (0-2, 2-0, 2-1)	Uzbekistan (UZB); L 1-2 (2-0, 1-2, 0-2) (bronze)	Did not advance
Kimiko Date-Krumm	Women's singles		BYE	Zhang Ling (HKG); W 6-3, 6-3	Lee Jin-a (KOR); W 7-6(2), 7-5	Peng Shuai (CHN); L 6(7)-7, 6-3, 6-4 (bronze)	Did not advance
Ayumi Morita	Women's singles		Ksenia Palkina (KGZ); W 6-1, 6-1	Hsu Wen-hsin (TPE); W 6-1, 6-2	Akgul Amanmuradova (UZB); L 2-6, 6-2, 2-6	Did not advance	
Kimiko Date-Krumm; Ayumi Morita	Women's doubles		BYE	Nudnida Luangnam (THA) and Nicha Lertpitaksinchai (THA); W 6-0, 5-7, [10-8]	Kim So-jung (KOR) and Lee Jin-a (KOR); L 6-3, 6(7)-7, [9-11]	Did not advance	
Misaki Doi; Ryoko Fuda	Women's doubles		Rushmi Chakravarthi (IND) and Poojashree Venkatesha (IND); W 6-3, 6-1	Chang Kai-chen (TPE) and Hsieh Su-wei (TPE); L 7-6(6), 4-6, [7-10]	Did not advance		
Misaki Doi; Ryoko Fuda; Kimiko Date-Krumm; Ayumi Morita	Women's team			BYE	Nepal (NEP); W 3-0 (2-0, 2-0, 2-0)	Chinese Taipei (TPE); L 1-2 (1-2, 1-0, 0-2) (bronze)	Did not advance
Yurika Sema; Hiroki Kondo	Mixed doubles		BYE	Rushmi Chakravarthi (IND) and Sanam Krishan Singh (IND); W 6-4, 3-6, [10-3]	Noppawan Lertcheewakarn (THA) and Sonchat Ratiwatana (THA); W 6-4, 6-4	Chan Yung-jan (KOR) and Yang Tsung-hua (KOR); L 3-6, 3-6 (bronze)	Did not advance
Misaki Doi; Takao Suzuki	Mixed doubles		BYE	Zhang Ling (CHN) and Martin Sayer (CHN); W 6-4, 6-4	Tamarine Tanasugarn (THA) and Sanchai Ratiwatana (THA); W 4-6, 4-6	Did not advance	

== Triathlon ==
Athlete	Event	Swim (1.5 km)	Trans 1	Bike (40 km)	Trans 2	Run (10 km)	Total	Rank
Yuichi Hosoda	Men's Individual	19:04; 4th	1:05; 4th	1:00:04; 6th	0:36; 2nd	31:25; 1st	1:52:15.56	1st place, gold medalist(s)
Ryosuke Yamamoto	Men's Individual	19:02; 2nd	1:06; 8th	1:00:05; 7th	0:37; 3rd	31:48; 2nd	1:52:41.49	2nd place, silver medalist(s)
Mariko Adachi	Women's Individual	19:35; 1st	1:18; 6th	1:08:27; 7th	0:46; 4th	35:37; 1st	2:05:44.59	1st place, gold medalist(s)
Akane Tsuchihashi	Women's Individual	19:37; 2nd	1:16; 5th	1:08:27; 6th	0:45; 2nd	36:24; 2nd	2:06:31.56	2nd place, silver medalist(s)

== Volleyball ==
=== Men ===
Team

Akio Nagae
Takeshi Nagano
Naoya Suga
Daisuke Usami
Yoshifumi Suzuki
Yuya Ageba
Takaaki Tomimatsu
Kota Yamamura
Kunihiro Shimizu
Tatsuya Fukuzawa
Yusuke Ishijima
Yuta Yoneyama

Preliminary

Group D

Pos	Team	Pld	W	L	Pts	SPW	SPL	SPR	SW	SL	SR	Qualification
1	Japan	4	4	0	8	307	186	1.651	12	0	MAX	Second round / Group E–F
2	Qatar	4	3	1	7	323	277	1.166	9	5	1.800	Second round / Group E–F
3	Athletes from Kuwait	4	2	2	6	314	312	1.006	8	7	1.143	Second round / Group G–H
4	Myanmar	4	1	3	5	238	299	0.796	4	9	0.444	Second round / Group G–H
5	Hong Kong	4	0	4	4	192	300	0.640	0	12	0.000	

Source: Results

Date	Time		Score		Set 1	Set 2	Set 3	Set 4	Set 5	Total
14 Nov	16:00	Japan	3–0	Myanmar	25–12	25–14	25–9			75–35
15 Nov	18:00	Kuwait	0–3	Japan	19–25	17–25	12–25			48–75
16 Nov	16:00	Japan	3–0	Qatar	25–19	25–15	32–30			82–64
17 Nov	20:00	Hong Kong	0–3	Japan	11–25	16–25	12–25			39–75

Second round

Group F

Pos	Team	Pld	W	L	Pts	SPW	SPL	SPR	SW	SL	SR	Qualification
1	South Korea	3	3	0	6	246	207	1.188	9	1	9.000	Quarterfinals
2	India	3	2	1	5	245	228	1.075	6	5	1.200	Quarterfinals
3	Japan	3	1	2	4	280	272	1.029	6	6	1.000	Quarterfinals
4	Qatar	3	0	3	3	168	232	0.724	0	9	0.000	Quarterfinals

Source: Results

Date	Time		Score		Set 1	Set 2	Set 3	Set 4	Set 5	Total
19 Nov	16:00	Japan	2–3	India	20–25	19–25	25–21	28–26	13–15	105–112
20 Nov	16:00	South Korea	3–1	Japan	25–23	21–25	25–23	25–22		96–93

Quarterfinals

Date	Time		Score		Set 1	Set 2	Set 3	Set 4	Set 5	Total
21 Nov	14:00	China	0–3	Japan	14–25	22–25	23–25			59–75

Semifinals

Date	Time		Score		Set 1	Set 2	Set 3	Set 4	Set 5	Total
24 Nov	18:00	South Korea	2–3	Japan	27–25	25–21	19–25	20–25	12–15	103–111

Gold medal match

Date	Time		Score		Set 1	Set 2	Set 3	Set 4	Set 5	Total
26 Nov	21:00	Japan	3–1	Iran	25–19	25–13	23–25	25–18		98–75

=== Women ===
Team

Hiroko Hakuta
Miku Izuoka
Misato Kimura
Mayumi Kosuge
Saki Minemura
Mariko Mori
Yuki Nishiyama
Rika Nomoto
Sakura Numata
Shoko Omura
Masami Yokoyama
Minami Yoshida

Preliminary

Group B

Pos	Team	Pld	W	L	Pts	SPW	SPL	SPR	SW	SL	SR	Qualification
1	Kazakhstan	5	5	0	10	443	317	1.397	15	4	3.750	Quarterfinals
2	North Korea	5	4	1	9	431	316	1.364	14	5	2.800	Quarterfinals
3	Japan	5	3	2	8	395	344	1.148	10	8	1.250	Quarterfinals
4	Chinese Taipei	5	2	3	7	429	365	1.175	11	9	1.222	Quarterfinals
5	India	5	1	4	6	260	319	0.815	3	12	0.250	Placement 9–11
6	Maldives	5	0	5	5	78	375	0.208	0	15	0.000	Placement 9–11

Source: Results

Date	Time		Score		Set 1	Set 2	Set 3	Set 4	Set 5	Total
18 Nov	14:00	Chinese Taipei	2–3	Japan	25–19	17–25	26–24	17–25	15–17	100–110
19 Nov	20:00	Japan	0–3	North Korea	21–25	17–25	13–25			51–75
20 Nov	16:00	India	0–3	Japan	23–25	16–25	17–25			56–75
21 Nov	14:00	Maldives	0–3	Japan	7–25	1–25	8–25			16–75
22 Nov	16:00	Japan	1–3	Kazakhstan	15–25	25–22	23–25	21–25		84–97

Quarterfinals

Date	Time		Score		Set 1	Set 2	Set 3	Set 4	Set 5	Total
24 Nov	16:00	South Korea	3–0	Japan	25–16	25–22	25–15			75–53

Placement 5–8

Date	Time		Score		Set 1	Set 2	Set 3	Set 4	Set 5	Total
25 Nov	14:00	Mongolia	0–3	Japan	15–25	6–25	11–25			32–75

Placement 5th–6th

Date	Time		Score		Set 1	Set 2	Set 3	Set 4	Set 5	Total
27 Nov	12:30	Japan	1–3	Thailand	12–25	28–26	14–25	26–28		80–104

== Water polo ==
Men

Team

Katsuyuki Tanamura
Mitsuaki Shiga
Kan Irei
Koji Takei
Kan Aoyagi
Hiroki Wakamatsu
Yusuke Shimizu
Akira Yanase
Koji Kobayashi
Yoshinori Shiota
Atsushi Naganuma
Satoshi Nagata
Shota Hazui

Preliminary

Group A

Pos	Team	Pld	W	D	L	GF	GA	GD	Pts	Qualification
1	Japan	4	4	0	0	72	16	+56	8	Quarterfinals
2	China	4	3	0	1	72	16	+56	6	Quarterfinals
3	South Korea	4	2	0	2	54	33	+21	4	Quarterfinals
4	Hong Kong	4	1	0	3	33	73	−40	2	Quarterfinals
5	Qatar	4	0	0	4	5	98	−93	0	

Source: Results

November 18; 15:55	Report	China	9–3	Japan	Tianhe Natatorium, Guangzhou; Referees: Margeta (SLO), Bock (GER)
November 18; 15:55	Report	Score by quarters: 4–2, 0–1, 3–0, 2–0			Tianhe Natatorium, Guangzhou; Referees: Margeta (SLO), Bock (GER)
November 18; 15:55	Report	Liang Z.X. 3	Goals	Aoyagi 3	Tianhe Natatorium, Guangzhou; Referees: Margeta (SLO), Bock (GER)

November 20; 9:00	Report	Japan	30–1	Hong Kong	Tianhe Natatorium, Guangzhou; Referees: Salnichenko (KAZ), Bock (GER)
November 20; 9:00	Report	Score by quarters: 5–1, 10–0, 7–0, 8–0			Tianhe Natatorium, Guangzhou; Referees: Salnichenko (KAZ), Bock (GER)
November 20; 9:00	Report	Aoyagi 5	Goals	Chung K.L. 1	Tianhe Natatorium, Guangzhou; Referees: Salnichenko (KAZ), Bock (GER)

November 21; 14:30	Report	Qatar	2–25	Japan	Tianhe Natatorium, Guangzhou; Referees: Stavridis (GRE), Tan (SIN)
November 21; 14:30	Report	Score by quarters: 1–10, 0–8, 1–3, 0–4			Tianhe Natatorium, Guangzhou; Referees: Stavridis (GRE), Tan (SIN)
November 21; 14:30	Report	Al-Lanjawi 2	Goals	Irei, Takei 5	Tianhe Natatorium, Guangzhou; Referees: Stavridis (GRE), Tan (SIN)

November 22; 9:00	Report	Japan	14–4	South Korea	Tianhe Natatorium, Guangzhou; Referees: Ni (CHN), Stavridis (GRE)
November 22; 9:00	Report	Score by quarters: 7–1, 1–1, 1–0, 5–2			Tianhe Natatorium, Guangzhou; Referees: Ni (CHN), Stavridis (GRE)
November 22; 9:00	Report	Shimizu, Yanase 3	Goals	Park J.J. 2	Tianhe Natatorium, Guangzhou; Referees: Ni (CHN), Stavridis (GRE)

Quarterfinals

November 23; 14:30	Report	Japan	25–3	Singapore	Tianhe Natatorium, Guangzhou; Referees: Shi (CHN), Chung (HKG)
November 23; 14:30	Report	Score by quarters: 5–2, 5–1, 8–0, 7–0			Tianhe Natatorium, Guangzhou; Referees: Shi (CHN), Chung (HKG)
November 23; 14:30	Report	Shiota 5	Goals	Loh Z.Z., Lin Diyan, Lin Diyang 1	Tianhe Natatorium, Guangzhou; Referees: Shi (CHN), Chung (HKG)

Semifinals

November 24; 20:55	Report	Japan	8–10	Kazakhstan	Tianhe Natatorium, Guangzhou; Referees: Bock (GER), Stavridis (GRE)
November 24; 20:55	Report	Score by quarters: 2–3, 3–4, 1–0, 2–3			Tianhe Natatorium, Guangzhou; Referees: Bock (GER), Stavridis (GRE)
November 24; 20:55	Report	Hazui 3	Goals	Gubarev 3	Tianhe Natatorium, Guangzhou; Referees: Bock (GER), Stavridis (GRE)

Bronze medal match

November 25; 19:45	Report	South Korea	5–19	Japan	Tianhe Natatorium, Guangzhou; Referees: Ni (CHN), Margeta (SLO)
November 25; 19:45	Report	Score by quarters: 1–2, 2–5, 0–6, 2–6			Tianhe Natatorium, Guangzhou; Referees: Ni (CHN), Margeta (SLO)
November 25; 19:45	Report	Kang J.W., Lee D.J. 2	Goals	Shimizu 5	Tianhe Natatorium, Guangzhou; Referees: Ni (CHN), Margeta (SLO)

== Weightlifting ==
Athlete	Event	Snatch			Clean & jerk			Total	Rank
Athlete	Event	Attempt 1	Attempt 2	Attempt 3	Attempt 1	Attempt 2	Attempt 3	Total	Rank
Masaharu Yamada	Men's 56 kg	~~103~~	103	106	~~145~~	~~145~~	145	251	7th
Genta Kawabata	Men's 94 kg	140	~~145~~	~~145~~	175	180	~~185~~	320	13th
Kazuomi Ota	Men's +105 kg	173	178	~~182~~	202	~~210~~	210	388	7th
Hiromi Miyake	Women's 53 kg	83	85	~~87~~	105	---	---	190	7th
Mayu Hashida	Women's 58 kg	86	88	90	108	111	~~114~~	201	10th
Ayano Tani	Women's 69 kg	92	95	97	~~118~~	118	121	218	6th

== Wrestling ==
=== Men ===
Freestyle

Athlete	Event	Round of 32	Round of 16	Quarterfinals	Semifinals	Final
Athlete	Event	Opposition Result	Opposition Result	Opposition Result	Opposition Result	Opposition Result
Yasuhiro Inaba	55 kg		Nurlan Makenaliev (KGZ); W PP 3-1	Daulet Niyazbekov (KAZ); W PO 3-0	Yang Kyong-Il (PRK); L ST 0-4	Bronze medal match: Damdinbazaryn Tsogtbaatar (MGL); W PO 3-0 (bronze)
Hiroyuki Oda	60 kg		Bazar Bazarguruev (KGZ); W PO 3-0	Ri Jong-Myong (PRK); W PP 3-1	Dauren Zhumagaziyev (KAZ); W PP 3-1	Ganzorigiin Mandakhnaran (MGL); L VT 0-5 (silver)
Tatsuhiro Yonemitsu	66 kg		Azat Donbaev (KGZ); W PP 3-1	Pradeep Kumar (IND); W PO 3-0	Yang Chun-Song (PRK); W PP 3-1	Mehdi Taghavi (IRI); W PP 3-1 (gold)
Kazuyuki Nagashima	74 kg		BYE	Mazen Kadmani (SYR); W PO 3-0	Dorjvaanchigiin Gombodorj (MGL); W PP 3-1	Sadegh Goudarzi (IRI); L PO 0-3 (silver)
Atsushi Matsumoto	84 kg		Muhammad Inam (PAK); L PP 1-3	Did not advance		
Takao Isokawa	96 kg		BYE	Faisal Al-Ketbi (UAE); W PO 3-0	Kurban Kurbanov (UZB); L PO 0-3	Bronze medal match: Farkhod Anakulov (TJK); W PO 3-0 (bronze)
Nobuyoshi Arakida	120 kg		Liang Lei (CHN); L PP 1-3	Did not advance		

Greco-Roman

Athlete	Event	Round of 16	Quarterfinals	Semifinals	Final
Athlete	Event	Opposition Result	Opposition Result	Opposition Result	Opposition Result
Kohei Hasegawa	55 kg	Marat Karishalov (KAZ); W PO 3-0	Kritsada Kongsrichai (THA); W ST 4-0	Hamid Sourian (IRI); W PP 3-1	Kanybek Zholchubekov (KGZ); W VT 5-0 (gold)
Ryutaro Matsumoto	60 kg	Omid Norouzi (IRI); L PO 0-3	Did not advance	Repechage Round 1 match: Xie Zhen (CHN); W PP 3-1	Bronze medal match: Sanjarbek Jumashev (UZB); W PP 3-1 (bronze)
Tsutomu Fujimura	66 kg	Zheng Pan (TKM); W PO 3-0	Kim Hyeon-Woo (KOR); W PP 3-1	Darkhan Bayakhmetov (IRI); L PO 0-3	Bronze medal match: Besiki Saldadze (UZB); W PP 3-1 (bronze)
Tsukasa Tsurumaki	74 kg	Farshad Alizadeh (IRI); W PP 3-1	Daler Karimov (TJK); W PO 3-0	Azizbek Murodov (UZB); W PP 3-1	Daniar Kobonov (KGZ); L PO 0-3 (silver)
Norikatsu Saikawa	84 kg	Janarbek Kenjeev (KGZ); L PO 0-3	Did not advance		
Katsuya Kitamura	96 kg	Arslan Saparmamedov (TKM); W PP 3-1	Azamat Erkimbaev (KGZ) 'L PO 0-3	Did not advance	
Hirokazu Shinjo	120 kg	Dharmender Dalal (IND); L PP 1-3	Did not advance		

=== Women ===
Freestyle

Athlete	Event	Round of 16	Quarterfinals	Semifinals	Final
Athlete	Event	Opposition Result	Opposition Result	Opposition Result	Opposition Result
Hitomi Sakamoto	48 kg	BYE	Zhao Shasha (CHN); W VT 5-0	So Sim-Hyang (PRK); L PP 1-3	Bronze medal match: Mikhrniso Nurmatova (KGZ); W VT 5-0 (bronze)
Saori Yoshida	55 kg	Batbaatariin Nomin-Erdene (MGL); W PO 3-0	Liliya Shakirova (UZB); W PO 3-0	Pak Yon-Hui (PRK); W VT 5-0	Zhang Lan (CHN); W PO 3-0 (gold)
Mio Nishimaki	63 kg	Try Sothavy (VIE); W PO 3-0	Ochirbatyn Nasanburmaa (MGL); L VT 0-5	Repechage Round 1 match: Chen Meng (CHN); L VT 0-5	Did not advance
Kyoko Hamaguchi	72 kg		Iana Panova (KGZ); W VT 5-0	Li Dan (CHN); L VT 0-5	Bronze medal match: Bae Mi-Kyung (KOR); W VT 5-0 (bronze)

== Wushu ==
=== Men ===
Changquan

Athlete	Event	Changquan		Total	
Athlete	Event	Result	Rank	Result	Rank
Daisuke Ichikizaki	Changquan	9.72	2nd place, silver medalist(s)		

Nanquan\Nangun

Athlete	Event	Nanquan		Nangun		Total	
Athlete	Event	Result	Rank	Result	Rank	Result	Rank
Koki Nakata	Nanquan\Nangun All-Round	9.42	8th	9.68	3rd	19.10	7th

Taijiquan\Taijijian

Athlete	Event	Taijijian		Taijiquan		Total	
Athlete	Event	Result	Rank	Result	Rank	Result	Rank
Yoshihiro Sekiya	Taijiquan\Taijijian All-Round	9.23	14th	9.59	8th	18.82	12th

=== Women ===
Changquan

Athlete	Event	Changquan		Total	
Athlete	Event	Result	Rank	Result	Rank
Yuki Hiraoka	Changquan	9.66	3rd place, bronze medalist(s)		

Taijiquan\Taijijian

Athlete	Event	Taijijian		Taijiquan		Total	
Athlete	Event	Result	Rank	Result	Rank	Result	Rank
Yoshihiro Sekiya	Taijiquan\Taijijian All-Round	9.67	1st	9.67	3rd	18.34	2nd place, silver medalist(s)

Jianshu\Qiangshu

Athlete	Event	Jianshu		Qiangshu		Total	
Athlete	Event	Result	Rank	Result	Rank	Result	Rank
Keiko Yamaguchi	Jianshu\Qiangshu All-Round	9.11	4th	9.65	3rd	18.76	4th
