= Softball at the 2010 Asian Games =

- Venue: Tianhe Softball Field
- Dates: 19–26 November 2010
- Competitors: 90 from 6 nations

Softball at the 2010 Asian Games was held in Guangzhou, Guangdong, China from November 19 to 26, 2010. Only a women's competition was held. All games were played at the Tianhe Softball Field.

== Schedule ==
P	Preliminary round	½	Semifinals	F	Final	G	Grand final

Event↓/Date →	19th Fri	20th Sat	21st Sun	22nd Mon	23rd Tue	24th Wed	25th Thu	26th Fri	
Women	P	P	P	P	P		½	F	G

== Medalists ==
Event	Gold	Silver	Bronze
Women	Japan; Yukiyo Mine; Rei Nishiyama; Ayumi Karino; Haruna Sakamoto; Shizuyo Hamamoto; Misato Kawano; Emi Matsuoka; Eri Yamada; Sayuri Yamane; Mika Someya; Naoko Matsumoto; Yukiko Ueno; Makiko Fujiwara; Satoko Mabuchi; Maki Tanigawa	China; Lü Wei; Li Qi; Li Chunxia; Lu Ying; Lü Yi; Wei Dongmei; Zhang Lifang; Xu Min; Zhou Yi; Tan Ying; Wang Yuan; Zhao Jing; Guo Jia; Wang Lan; Li Huan	Chinese Taipei; Lin Su-hua; Li Szu-shih; Chung Hui-lin; Lai Meng-ting; Huang Hui-wen; Li Chiu-ching; Chen Miao-yi; Chueh Ming-hui; Chiang Hui-chuan; Chang Man-hsuan; Lin Pei-chun; Chiu An-ju; Lo Yin-sha; Lu Hsueh-mei; Liu Hui-fang

== Squads ==
Squads

China	Chinese Taipei	Japan	Philippines
Lü Wei; Li Qi; Li Chunxia; Lu Ying; Lü Yi; Wei Dongmei; Zhang Lifang; Xu Min; Zhou Yi; Tan Ying; Wang Yuan; Zhao Jing; Guo Jia; Wang Lan; Li Huan	Lin Su-hua; Li Szu-shih; Chung Hui-lin; Lai Meng-ting; Huang Hui-wen; Li Chiu-ching; Chen Miao-yi; Chueh Ming-hui; Chiang Hui-chuan; Chang Man-hsuan; Lin Pei-chun; Chiu An-ju; Lo Yin-sha; Lu Hsueh-mei; Liu Hui-fang	Yukiyo Mine; Rei Nishiyama; Ayumi Karino; Haruna Sakamoto; Shizuyo Hamamoto; Misato Kawano; Emi Matsuoka; Eri Yamada; Sayuri Yamane; Mika Someya; Naoko Matsumoto; Yukiko Ueno; Makiko Fujiwara; Satoko Mabuchi; Maki Tanigawa	Veronica Belleza; Anavic Jugos; Marlyn Francisco; Sarah Agravante; Julie Marie Muyco; Elma Parohinog; Syrel Ramos; Kristine Drilon; Corazon Soberre; Sheiryl Valenzuela; Dione Macasu; Joy Lasquite; Luvelyn Maganda; Esmeralda Tayag; Alex Zuluaga
South Korea	Thailand		
Lim Mi-ran; Pak Sun-yeo; Jeong Yoon-young; Lee Eun-mi; Suk Eun-jung; Yang Lee-sel; Choi Mi-jin; Yoon Hye-young; Noh Keum-ran; Jung Ha-na; Park Su-youn; Kim Bo-ram; Kim Min-young; Chun Hyang-na; Min Hae-jin	Somporn Klaysuan; Pariyakorn Paoklang; Waraporn Konyuen; Tawanporn Piriyayota; Neeranart Chaiyakond; Tanyaporn Rujihan; Tassaneewan Kwaopanya; Kantrakorn Jitisaree; Sasithorn Wilairak; Parima Phandakiri; Piyaporn Sarakong; Sumalee Suansara; Paweena Sangkong; Atcharaphan Sisuk; Wannaporn Punjaroen		

== Results ==
All times are China Standard Time (UTC+08:00)

=== Preliminaries ===
Pos	Team	Pld	W	L	RF	RA	PCT	GB	Qualification
1	Chinese Taipei	5	5	0	26	7	1.000	—	Semifinals
2	Japan	5	4	1	25	3	.800	1	Semifinals
3	China	5	3	2	24	9	.600	2	Semifinals
4	South Korea	5	2	3	13	14	.400	3	Semifinals
5	Philippines	5	1	4	7	24	.200	4	
6	Thailand	5	0	5	2	40	.000	5	

Source: Results

19 November; 13:00	Japan	15–0 (F/3)	Thailand	Tianhe Softball Field, Guangzhou; Umpires: Li Zhe (CHN)
19 November; 13:00	WP: Makiko Fujiwara		LP: Parima Phandakiri	Tianhe Softball Field, Guangzhou; Umpires: Li Zhe (CHN)

Team	1	2	3	4	5	6	7	R	H	E
Thailand	0	0	0	—	—	—	—	0	0	6
Japan	9	4	2	—	—	—	—	15	12	0

19 November; 15:30	Chinese Taipei	2–1	South Korea	Tianhe Softball Field, Guangzhou; Umpires: Narayanasamy Muthukumar (MAS)
19 November; 15:30	WP: Chung Hui-lin		LP: Park Su-youn	Tianhe Softball Field, Guangzhou; Umpires: Narayanasamy Muthukumar (MAS)

Team	1	2	3	4	5	6	7	R	H	E
South Korea	0	1	0	0	0	0	0	1	4	1
Chinese Taipei	2	0	0	0	0	0	X	2	5	0

19 November; 18:00	Philippines	1–7	China	Tianhe Softball Field, Guangzhou; Umpires: Choi Chi-hwan (KOR)
19 November; 18:00	LP: Joy Lasquite		WP: Lü Wei	Tianhe Softball Field, Guangzhou; Umpires: Choi Chi-hwan (KOR)

Team	1	2	3	4	5	6	7	R	H	E
China	0	3	2	0	2	0	0	7	9	2
Philippines	0	0	0	0	1	0	0	1	4	2

20 November; 13:00	Philippines	2–9	Chinese Taipei	Tianhe Softball Field, Guangzhou; Umpires: Hideko Okano (JPN)
20 November; 13:00	LP: Syrel Ramos		WP: Chueh Ming-hui	Tianhe Softball Field, Guangzhou; Umpires: Hideko Okano (JPN)

Team	1	2	3	4	5	6	7	R	H	E
Chinese Taipei	0	0	0	2	3	1	3	9	13	4
Philippines	0	0	0	0	0	1	1	2	7	1

20 November; 15:30	Thailand	0–9 (F/5)	China	Tianhe Softball Field, Guangzhou; Umpires: Chee Eng Kiat (SIN)
20 November; 15:30	LP: Sasithorn Wilairak		WP: Wang Lan	Tianhe Softball Field, Guangzhou; Umpires: Chee Eng Kiat (SIN)

Team	1	2	3	4	5	6	7	R	H	E
China	0	1	2	3	3	—	—	9	10	0
Thailand	0	0	0	0	0	—	—	0	1	1

20 November; 18:00	Japan	3–0	South Korea	Tianhe Softball Field, Guangzhou; Umpires: Xing Lisha (CHN)
20 November; 18:00	WP: Mika Someya		LP: Lim Mi-ran	Tianhe Softball Field, Guangzhou; Umpires: Xing Lisha (CHN)
20 November; 18:00	HR: Ayumi Karino (1)			Tianhe Softball Field, Guangzhou; Umpires: Xing Lisha (CHN)

Team	1	2	3	4	5	6	7	R	H	E
South Korea	0	0	0	0	0	0	0	0	1	0
Japan	0	0	0	1	0	2	X	3	7	0

21 November; 13:00	South Korea	0–4	China	Tianhe Softball Field, Guangzhou; Umpires: Hsu Chan Kun-ying (TPE)
21 November; 13:00	LP: Park Su-youn		WP: Li Qi	Tianhe Softball Field, Guangzhou; Umpires: Hsu Chan Kun-ying (TPE)

Team	1	2	3	4	5	6	7	R	H	E
China	0	2	0	1	0	0	1	4	7	0
South Korea	0	0	0	0	0	0	0	0	5	3

21 November; 15:30	Chinese Taipei	2–1	Japan	Tianhe Softball Field, Guangzhou; Umpires: Li Zhe (CHN)
21 November; 15:30	WP: Chung Hui-lin		LP: Yukiko Ueno	Tianhe Softball Field, Guangzhou; Umpires: Li Zhe (CHN)
21 November; 15:30	HR: Chiang Hui-chuan (1)			Tianhe Softball Field, Guangzhou; Umpires: Li Zhe (CHN)

Team	1	2	3	4	5	6	7	R	H	E
Japan	0	0	0	0	0	0	1	1	6	0
Chinese Taipei	2	0	0	0	0	0	X	2	3	1

21 November; 18:00	Philippines	1–0	Thailand	Tianhe Softball Field, Guangzhou; Umpires: Jeon Mun-sook (KOR)
21 November; 18:00	WP: Syrel Ramos		LP: Parima Phandakiri	Tianhe Softball Field, Guangzhou; Umpires: Jeon Mun-sook (KOR)

Team	1	2	3	4	5	6	7	R	H	E
Thailand	0	0	0	0	0	0	0	0	2	1
Philippines	0	1	0	0	0	0	X	1	4	0

22 November; 13:00	Japan	4–0	Philippines	Tianhe Softball Field, Guangzhou; Umpires: Pansiri Jaidee (THA)
22 November; 13:00	WP: Sayuri Yamane		LP: Corazon Soberre	Tianhe Softball Field, Guangzhou; Umpires: Pansiri Jaidee (THA)

Team	1	2	3	4	5	6	7	R	H	E
Philippines	0	0	0	0	0	0	0	0	1	1
Japan	2	0	1	1	0	0	X	4	11	0

22 November; 15:30	South Korea	8–2	Thailand	Tianhe Softball Field, Guangzhou; Umpires: Chen Tsung-ho (TPE)
22 November; 15:30	WP: Yang Lee-sel		LP: Somporn Klaysuan	Tianhe Softball Field, Guangzhou; Umpires: Chen Tsung-ho (TPE)

Team	1	2	3	4	5	6	7	R	H	E
Thailand	0	0	2	0	0	0	0	2	6	4
South Korea	0	4	0	2	0	2	X	8	10	1

22 November; 18:00	China	3–6	Chinese Taipei	Tianhe Softball Field, Guangzhou; Umpires: Kyo Masuda (JPN)
22 November; 18:00	LP: Li Qi		WP: Chung Hui-lin	Tianhe Softball Field, Guangzhou; Umpires: Kyo Masuda (JPN)
22 November; 18:00			HR: Chiang Hui-chuan (1)	Tianhe Softball Field, Guangzhou; Umpires: Kyo Masuda (JPN)

Team	1	2	3	4	5	6	7	R	H	E
Chinese Taipei	0	0	4	2	0	0	0	6	6	2
China	0	0	0	0	0	3	0	3	6	1

23 November; 13:00	South Korea	4–3 (F/9)	Philippines	Tianhe Softball Field, Guangzhou; Umpires: Liu Juan (CHN)
23 November; 13:00	WP: Park Su-youn		LP: Veronica Belleza	Tianhe Softball Field, Guangzhou; Umpires: Liu Juan (CHN)

Team	1	2	3	4	5	6	7	8	9	R	H	E
Philippines	0	0	2	0	0	1	0	0	0	3	6	1
South Korea	0	0	0	0	0	3	0	0	1	4	8	0

23 November; 15:30	China	1–2	Japan	Tianhe Softball Field, Guangzhou; Umpires: Chen Tsung-ho (TPE)
23 November; 15:30	LP: Li Qi		WP: Yukiko Ueno	Tianhe Softball Field, Guangzhou; Umpires: Chen Tsung-ho (TPE)

Team	1	2	3	4	5	6	7	R	H	E
Japan	1	0	0	1	0	0	0	2	6	2
China	1	0	0	0	0	0	0	1	3	2

23 November; 18:00	Chinese Taipei	7–0 (F/5)	Thailand	Tianhe Softball Field, Guangzhou; Umpires: Hideko Okano (JPN)
23 November; 18:00	WP: Chiu An-ju		LP: Piyaporn Sarakong	Tianhe Softball Field, Guangzhou; Umpires: Hideko Okano (JPN)

Team	1	2	3	4	5	6	7	R	H	E
Thailand	0	0	0	0	0	—	—	0	1	1
Chinese Taipei	3	3	0	1	X	—	—	7	7	0

=== Final round ===
Semifinals
1	Chinese Taipei	2
2	Japan	5
3	China	7
4	South Korea	1

Final
1	Chinese Taipei	1
3	China	2

Grand final
2	Japan	2
3	China	0

==== Semifinals ====
25 November; 16:00	Chinese Taipei	2–5	Japan	Tianhe Softball Field, Guangzhou; Umpires: Liu Juan (CHN)
25 November; 16:00	LP: Chueh Ming-hui		WP: Yukiko Ueno	Tianhe Softball Field, Guangzhou; Umpires: Liu Juan (CHN)
25 November; 16:00	HR: Chiang Hui-chuan (1)			Tianhe Softball Field, Guangzhou; Umpires: Liu Juan (CHN)

Team	1	2	3	4	5	6	7	R	H	E
Japan	0	0	0	0	5	0	0	5	9	0
Chinese Taipei	0	0	0	1	0	0	1	2	4	1

25 November; 18:30	China	7–1	South Korea	Tianhe Softball Field, Guangzhou; Umpires: Hideko Okano (JPN)
25 November; 18:30	WP: Wang Lan		LP: Park Su-youn	Tianhe Softball Field, Guangzhou; Umpires: Hideko Okano (JPN)

Team	1	2	3	4	5	6	7	R	H	E
South Korea	1	0	0	0	0	0	0	1	2	4
China	0	3	1	0	3	0	X	7	10	1

==== Final ====
26 November; 13:00	Chinese Taipei	1–2	China	Tianhe Softball Field, Guangzhou; Umpires: Kyo Masuda (JPN)
26 November; 13:00	LP: Chung Hui-lin		WP: Li Qi	Tianhe Softball Field, Guangzhou; Umpires: Kyo Masuda (JPN)

Team	1	2	3	4	5	6	7	R	H	E
China	2	0	0	0	0	0	0	2	7	0
Chinese Taipei	0	0	0	0	0	1	0	1	5	1

==== Grand final ====
26 November; 18:30	China	0–2	Japan	Tianhe Softball Field, Guangzhou; Umpires: Chen Tsung-ho (TPE)
26 November; 18:30	LP: Wang Lan		WP: Yukiko Ueno	Tianhe Softball Field, Guangzhou; Umpires: Chen Tsung-ho (TPE)

Team	1	2	3	4	5	6	7	R	H	E
Japan	0	0	0	1	0	1	0	2	7	1
China	0	0	0	0	0	0	0	0	1	0

== Final standing ==
Rank	Team	Pld	W	L
1st place, gold medalist(s)	Japan	7	6	1
2nd place, silver medalist(s)	China	8	5	3
3rd place, bronze medalist(s)	Chinese Taipei	7	5	2
4	South Korea	6	2	4
5	Philippines	5	1	4
6	Thailand	5	0	5
