= Sun Li =

Sun Li may refer to:

- Sun Li (general) (died 250), a general of Cao Wei during the Three Kingdoms period
- Sun Li (writer, born 1913) (孙犁), Chinese novelist
- Sun Li (writer, born 1949) (孙力), Chinese novelist
- Sun Li (softball) (born 1981), Chinese softball player
- Sun Li (actress) (born 1982), also known as Susan Sun, Chinese actress
- Sun Li (Water Margin), a fictional character in the classical Chinese novel Water Margin
