= Wenli =

Wenli or Wen Li may refer to:

== Places ==
- Wenli (town) (文利镇), town in Lingshan County, Guangxi, China

== People ==
=== Full name ===
- Wen Li (Shu Han) (died 279 AD), Chinese official and scholar
- Wen Li (space physicist), Chinese-American space physicist

=== Last name ===
- Ai Wenli (born 1955), former Chinese politician
- Guo Wenli (born 1989), Chinese curler
- Jiang Wenli (born 1969), Chinese actress and director
- Pan Wenli (born 1969), Chinese volleyball player
- Xu Wenli (born 1943), Chinese dissident
- Zhang Wenli (died 921 AD), Chinese politician

=== First name ===
- Wen Li Lai (born 2000), Malaysian squash player
- Wen Li-hsiu (born 1982), Taiwanese Olympic softball player

== See also ==
- Li Wen (disambiguation)
