= Tan Ying =

Tan Ying may refer to:

- Tan Ying (actress) (1915-2001), Chinese film actress
- Tan Ying (softball) (born 1982), Chinese softball player
- Tan Ying (water polo) (born 1987), Chinese female water polo player
