= Paul Leahy =

Paul Leahy may refer to:

- Paul Leahy, convicted murderer of Alexandra Zapp
- Paul Leahy (Saw), a character in the Saw films
- Paul Conway Leahy (1904–1966), U.S. federal judge
