= Yu Xiaohui =

Chinese novelist

- 余小惠
- Born: 1949 (age 76–77); Shanghai, China
- Education: Tianjin Normal University
- Occupation: Novelist
- Spouse: Sun Li
- Writing career
- Language: Chinese
- Period: 1981–present
- Genre: Novel
- Notable work: Metropolis
- Notable awards: 3rd Mao Dun Literature Prize; 1991 Metropolis

Yu Xiaohui (Chinese: 余小惠; pinyin: Yú Xiǎohuì; born 1949) is a Chinese novelist. Yu is a member of the Chinese Communist Party and China Writers Association. She shared the Mao Dun Literature Prize with her husband Sun Li in 1991.

== Biography ==
Yu was born in Shanghai in 1949. She worked in Heilongjiang Production and Construction Corps in 1968. She graduated from Tianjin Normal University in 1974. After graduation, Yu worked in Tianjin Art Academy (天津工艺美术学院) and Tianjin College of Traditional Chinese Medicine (天津中医学院) as a teacher. Yu started to publish novels in 1981. She joined the China Writers Association in 1991.

== Works ==
=== Novels ===
- Rhapsody of Metropolis (都市风流) (co-author: Sun Li)
  - English translation: Metropolis translated by David Kwan. Beijing: Panda Books, 1992.
- Wishing We Last Forever (但愿人长久) (co-author: Sun Li)

== Awards ==
- Metropolis – 3rd Mao Dun Literature Prize (1991)

== Personal life ==
Yu married novelist Sun Li. They co-wrote the novels Metropolis and Wishing We Last Forever.
