= Li Wen =

Li Wen may refer to:

- Emperor Yizong of Tang (833–873), originally named Li Wen
- Li Wen (general) (1905–1977), KMT general from Hunan
- Coco Lee (1975–2023), Chinese name Li Wen, Hong Kong-born American singer, songwriter, and actress
- Li Wen (footballer) (born 1989), Chinese footballer

== See also ==
- Lee Wen (1957–2019), Singaporean artist
- Lii Wen (born 1989), Taiwanese journalist and politician
- Wenli (disambiguation)
