= ALLY Foundation =

American non-profit organization

The ALLY Foundation
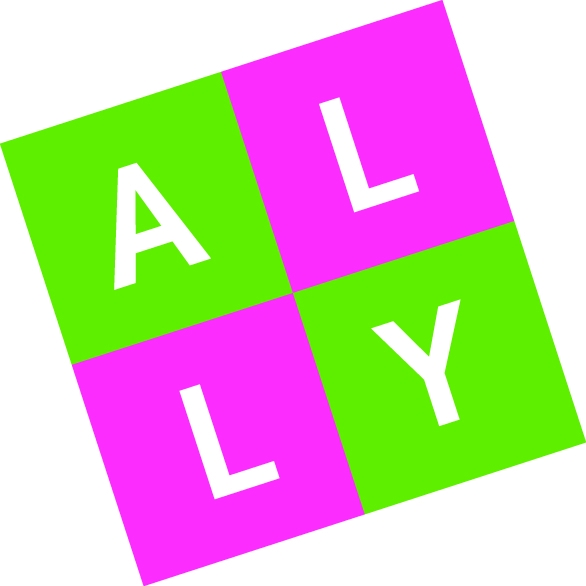
- The ALLY Foundation Logo

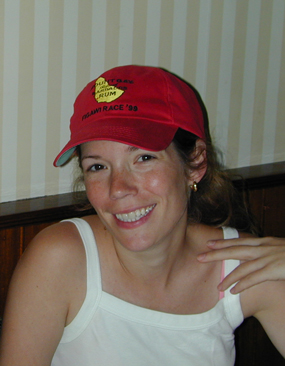
- Alexandra Nicole Zapp
- Formation: 2002
- Founder: Andrea Casanova, Steven Stiles
- Type: Nonprofit
- Location: Boston, Massachusetts, United States
- Website: theallyfoundation.org

The ALLY Foundation is an American 501(c)(3), not-for-profit organization based in Boston, Massachusetts, concerned with sexual violence.

The ALLY Foundation was founded in December 2002 by Andrea Casanova and Steven Stiles in memory of their murdered daughter and step daughter, Alexandra Zapp ("Ally"). Ally was murdered on July 18, 2002, by convicted sex offender Paul Leahy in a Burger King restroom on her drive home to Newport, Rhode Island.

The ALLY Foundation was included in the White House signing of The Adam Walsh Child Protection and Safety Act.

In 2018, the ALLY Foundation launched the Let's End It! video series that featured experts from all disciplines speaking about sexual violence.
