= Zhang Ai =

Chinese softball player

Personal information
- Born: September 23, 1981 (age 45) Shanghai
- Height: 166 cm (5 ft 5 in)
Medal record
Women's softball
Representing China
Asian Games
| Silver medal – second place | 2002 Busan | Team |
| Bronze medal – third place | 2006 Doha | Team |

Zhang Ai (simplified Chinese: 张爱; traditional Chinese: 張愛; pinyin: Zhāng Ài; born September 23, 1981, in Shanghai) is a female Chinese softball player. She competed at the 2004 Summer Olympics.

In the 2004 Olympic softball competition she finished fourth with the Chinese team. She played all eight matches as infielder.
