= Zhang Lifang =

Chinese softball player (born 1982)

Medal record

Women's softball

Representing China

Asian Games
Silver medal – second place	2010 Guangzhou	Softball
Bronze medal – third place	2006 Doha	Softball

Zhang Lifang (Chinese: 张丽芳; pinyin: Zhāng Lìfāng; born January 3, 1982) is a female Chinese softball player who was born in Henan, China.

She was part of Team China at the 2006 World Championship and placed fourth in the competition. She also competed for Team China at the 2008 Summer Olympics held in Beijing and was placed sixth.

Earlier in her career, she was on the Henan Women's Softball Team when it won the national softball championship in 2001.

She later became a softball coach for the Henan team.
