= Bheiglys Mujica =

Venezuelan softball player

Personal information
- Born: 11 August 1989 (age 36) Valencia, Venezuela

Sport
- Sport: Softball

Bheiglys Mujica (born 11 August 1989) is a Venezuelan softball player. She competed in the women's tournament at the 2008 Summer Olympics.
