= Zhou Yi (softball) =

Chinese softball player

Personal information
- Born: July 20, 1983 (age 42) Chengdu, Sichuan
- Height: 168 cm (5 ft 6 in)
Medal record
Women's softball
Representing China
Asian Games
Silver medal – second place	2002 Busan	Team
Silver medal – second place	2010 Guangzhou	Team
Bronze medal – third place	2006 Doha	Team

Zhou Yi (Chinese: 周怡; pinyin: Zhōu Yí; born July 20, 1983) is a Chinese softball player who competed at the 2004 Summer Olympics.

In the 2004 Olympic softball competition she finished fourth with the Chinese team. She played all eight matches as outfielder.
