= Li Chunxia =

Chinese softball player

Medal record

Women's softball

Representing China

Asian Games
Silver medal – second place	2010 Guangzhou	Softball
Bronze medal – third place	2006 Doha	Softball

Li Chunxia (Chinese: 黎春霞; pinyin: Lí Chūnxiá; born March 4, 1977, in Chengdu, Sichuan) is a female Chinese softball player. She competed at the 2004 Summer Olympics.

In the 2004 Olympic softball competition she finished fourth with the Chinese team. She played five matches as infielder.
