= Xin Minhong =

Chinese softball player (born 1979)

Personal information
- Born: May 17, 1979 (age 47) Dalian, Liaoning
- Height: 170 cm (5 ft 7 in)
Medal record
Women's softball
Representing China
Asian Games
Silver medal – second place	2002 Busan	Team
Bronze medal – third place	2006 Doha	Team

Xin Minhong (Chinese: 辛敏红, born May 17, 1979 in Dalian, Liaoning) is a female Chinese softball player. She was part of the fourth place team at the 2006 World Championship.

She also competed for Team China at the 2008 Summer Olympics in Beijing.
