= Lei Donghui =

Chinese softball player

Lei Donghui (Chinese: 雷东辉; pinyin: Léi Dōnghuī, born May 5, 1984, in Beijing) is a female Chinese softball player. She was part of the fourth-placed team at the 2003 Junior World Championship.

She also competed for Team China at the 2008 Summer Olympics in Beijing.

== See also ==
- Softball at the 2008 Summer Olympics
