= Sid Avery =

American photographer (1918–2002)

Sid Avery (October 12, 1918 – July 1, 2002) was an American photographer and director who was best known for capturing the private moments of legendary Hollywood celebrities like Elizabeth Taylor, Rock Hudson, James Dean, Marlon Brando, Humphrey Bogart and Audrey Hepburn as showcased in his book, "Hollywood at Home."

== Birth ==
Sid Avery was born in Akron, Ohio, in 1918. Avery was only nine months old when they decided to move out to Los Angeles, California, which is where he grew up.

== Biography ==
Sid Avery discovered his love and talent of photography when he was young due to the fact that he was able to work with his uncle, Max Tatch, who was a landscape and architectural photographer. His uncle was able to teach him the skills required to use cameras, film, and darkrooms. After he graduated from high school, Avery worked in a camera store on Sunset Boulevard, Hollywood where he further gained love and inspiration for photography. While working in the shop, he had opportunities to meet many famous photographers. This also encouraged him to take more photography classes. He also gained the experience of being a darkroom assistant. He served in the Army in World War II. When he returned from the war, he began his work of photographing celebrities. Sid Avery eventually became one of the top advertising photographers in Los Angeles. He was also a director of television commercials.

== Education ==
Sid Avery received his high school education at the institution of Roosevelt High School.

== Death ==
Sid Avery died at the age of 83 on July 1, 2002, in Los Angeles, California.

== Family ==
Sid Avery was married to Diana Avery. Together they had three children named Sandra Guttman, Marc Avery, and Ron Avery. Sid Avery also had three grandchildren.

== Successes ==
He founded the Hollywood Photographer's Archive (HPA) and which is known today as mptvimages.com in an effort to preserve the work of the early Hollywood photographers. Sid Avery's work was commonly featured in publications such as Life, Look, Colliers and The Saturday Evening Post. There is a collection of his work, Hollywood at Home: A Family Album 1950-1965, that was published by Crown in the year of 1990. He is most famous for his work of photography that captured the home life of famous celebrities at the time. He captured the celebrities in their own element aside from the glamour of fame.
