= Sun Li (writer, born 1949) =

Chinese novelist

- 孙力
- Born: Sun Shengli (孙胜利); October 16, 1949; Guangxi, China
- Died: May 9, 2010 (aged 60); Tianjin
- Education: Tianjin Normal University
- Occupation: Novelist
- Spouse: Yu Xiaohui
- Writing career
- Language: Chinese
- Period: 1984 - 2010
- Genre: Novel
- Notable work: Metropolis
- Notable awards: 3rd Mao Dun Literature Prize; 1991 Metropolis

Sun Li (simplified Chinese: 孙力; traditional Chinese: 孫力; pinyin: Sūn Lì; 16 October 1949 - 9 May 2010) was a Chinese novelist. He was a member of the Chinese Communist Party. He was a recipient of one of the most prestigious literature prizes in China, the Mao Dun Literature Prize.

== Biography ==
Sun was born in Guangxi in 1949, with his ancestral home in Ding County, Hebei. His birth name was Sun Shengli (孙胜利).

Sun worked in Inner Mongolia Production and Construction Corps in 1969. Sun graduated from Tianjin Normal University in 1974. He started to publish novels in 1984.

Sun died in Tianjin in 2010.

== Works ==
=== Novels ===
- Rhapsody of Metropolis (都市风流) (co-author: Yu Xiaohui)
  - English translation: Metropolis translated by David Kwan. Beijing: Panda Books, 1992.
- Wishing We Last Forever (但愿人长久) (co-author: Yu Xiaohui)

== Awards ==
- Metropolis - 3rd Mao Dun Literature Prize (1991)

== Personal life ==
Sun married Yu Xiaohui, who is also a famous novelist, they collaborated on the novel, Metropolis.
