= Pan Xia =

Chinese softball player (born 1981)

Pan Xia (born October 5, 1981 in Zigong) is a female Chinese softball player. She was part of the 3rd placed team at the 2005 National Games.

She will compete for Team China at the 2008 Summer Olympics in Beijing.
