= Wen Li (space physicist) =

Space physicist

- Education: University of California, Los Angeles
- Scientific career
- Workplaces: Boston University
- Thesis: Characteristics, generation, and role of chorus waves in the Earth's radiation belts : observations and simulations (2010)

Wen Li is a space physicist at Boston University. Her research interests include space plasma waves, Earth's radiation belt physics, solar-wind magnetosphere coupling, energetic particle precipitation, and the Jovian magnetosphere and aurora. She is a Fellow of the American Geophysical Union.

== Biography ==
Wen Li received a B.Sc. in Geophysics from the University of Science and Technology of China in 2005. She earned an M.S. and Ph.D. in Atmospheric and Oceanic Sciences from the University of California, Los Angeles in 2007 and 2010, respectively. Following her Ph.D., she remained at the University of California, Los Angeles as an associate researcher until 2016, when she moved to Boston University.

Li's research focuses on waves in Earth's magnetosphere, modeling Earth's radiation belts, and examining radiation belts on Jupiter. In 2019, she received funding to examine plasma waves called 'whistler mode waves', which are high-energy electrons in Earth's radiation belts.

== Research ==
One of Li's research areas concerns "killer electrons," electrons that emit a high level of radiation that can damage satellites in Earth's radiation belts. Li uses multi-satellite observations to study this process, which has implications for national security and commercial interests.

Her research and use of low-altitude satellite data has revealed that electromagnetic ion cyclotron waves during geomagnetic storms and recovery cause the loss of relativistic electrons that would typically be trapped in Earth's radiation belts. To understand the distribution of these plasma waves, Li used low-satellite data to calculate plasma wave properties and create a more detailed global distribution than previously available. These findings have since been incorporated into numerous other research projects and studies.

== Honors and awards ==
- 2015: Air Force Young Investigator Award
- 2014, 2015, 2016: Young Scientists Awards in the International Union of Radio Science
- 2017: American Geophysical Union (AGU) Fellow
- 2017: AGU James B. Macelwane Medal
- 2018: Alfred P. Sloan Research Fellow in Physics
- 2019: NSF CAREER Award

== Selected publications ==
- Thorne, R. M.; Li, W.; Ni, B.; Ma, Q.; Bortnik, J.; Chen, L.; Baker, D. N.; Spence, H. E.; Reeves, G. D.; Henderson, M. G.; Kletzing, C. A. (2013). "Rapid local acceleration of relativistic radiation-belt electrons by magnetospheric chorus". Nature. 504 (7480): 411–414. Bibcode:2013Natur.504..411T. doi:10.1038/nature12889. ISSN 0028-0836. PMID 24352287. S2CID 4387148.
- Li, W.; Shprits, Y. Y.; Thorne, R. M. (2007). "Dynamic evolution of energetic outer zone electrons due to wave-particle interactions during storms: EVOLUTION OF ENERGETIC ELECTRONS". Journal of Geophysical Research: Space Physics. 112 (A10): n/a. Bibcode:2007JGRA..11210220L. doi:10.1029/2007JA012368.
- Li, W.; Thorne, R. M.; Angelopoulos, V.; Bortnik, J.; Cully, C. M.; Ni, B.; LeContel, O.; Roux, A.; Auster, U.; Magnes, W. (2009). "Global distribution of whistler-mode chorus waves observed on the THEMIS spacecraft". Geophysical Research Letters. 36 (9) 2009GL037595. Bibcode:2009GeoRL..36.9104L. doi:10.1029/2009GL037595. ISSN 1944-8007. S2CID 120391902.
- Li, W.; Bortnik, J.; Thorne, R. M.; Angelopoulos, V. (2011). "Global distribution of wave amplitudes and wave normal angles of chorus waves using THEMIS wave observations: CHORUS WAVE DISTRIBUTION ON THEMIS". Journal of Geophysical Research: Space Physics. 116 (A12): n/a. doi:10.1029/2011JA017035.
