= Camillus Perera (umpire) =

Sri Lankan cricket umpire (1937–2002)

Personal information
- Full name: Deutrom Conrad Camillus Perera
- Born: 12 November 1937; Ratnapura, Sri Lanka
- Died: 15 July 2002 (aged 64); Colombo, Sri Lanka

Umpiring information
- Tests umpired: 1 (1986)
- ODIs umpired: 1 (1985)
- Source: Cricinfo, 14 July 2013

Camillus Perera (12 November 1937 – 15 July 2002) was a Sri Lankan cricket umpire. He officiated in only two international matches in his umpiring career, a Test match in 1986 and an ODI game in 1985.

== See also ==
- List of Test cricket umpires
- List of One Day International cricket umpires
