= Romuald Halm =

Austrian equestrian

Personal information
- Nationality: Austrian
- Born: 14 May 1918
- Died: 17 July 2002 (aged 84)

Sport
- Sport: Equestrian

Romuald Halm (14 May 1918 – 17 July 2002) was an Austrian equestrian. He competed in two events at the 1956 Summer Olympics.
