= Jørgen Moritzen =

Danish weightlifter (1918–2002)

Personal information
- Nationality: Danish
- Born: 13 October 1918 Copenhagen, Denmark
- Died: 28 July 2002 (aged 83) Frederiksberg, Denmark

Sport
- Sport: Weightlifting

Jørgen Moritzen (13 October 1918 – 28 July 2002) was a Danish weightlifter. He competed at the 1948 Summer Olympics and the 1952 Summer Olympics.
