= Lü Wei (softball) =

Chinese softball player

Medal record

Women's softball

Representing China

Asian Games
Silver medal – second place	2010 Guangzhou	Softball
Bronze medal – third place	2006 Doha	Softball

Lü Wei (simplified Chinese: 吕伟; traditional Chinese: 呂偉; pinyin: Lǚ Wěi; born June 21, 1983, in Beijing) is a 5-foot-11-inch (1.80 m) female Chinese softball player (pitcher) who competed at the 2004 Summer Olympics, the 2006 world championship, the 2006 World Cup of Softball and the 2008 Summer Olympics.

Lü started competing in 1998. She joined the national team in 2002. Lü came off elbow surgery in March 2007, operation and recovery which took place in Cincinnati where Lü was flown by team China.

In the 2004 Olympic softball competition she finished fourth with the Chinese team. She played seven matches as pitcher.
