= Alexandru Dan (gymnast) =

Romanian gymnast

- Born: 26 July 1907 Mülheim an der Ruhr, German Empire
- Died: 6 July 2002 (aged 94) Reșița, Romania

Gymnastics career
- Discipline: Men's artistic gymnastics
- Country represented: Romania

Alexandru Dan (26 July 1907 – 6 July 2002) was a Romanian gymnast. He competed in eight events at the 1936 Summer Olympics.
