= Li Qi (softball) =

Chinese softball player

Personal information
- Born: May 17, 1979 (age 47) Dalian, Liaoning
- Height: 175 cm (5 ft 9 in)
Medal record
Women's softball
Representing China
Asian Games
Silver medal – second place	2002 Busan	Team
Silver medal – second place	2010 Guangzhou	Team
Bronze medal – third place	2006 Doha	Team
Bronze medal – third place	2018 Jakarta-Palembang	Team

Li Qi (Chinese: 李琪; born 30 October 1983 in Dalian, Liaoning) is a Chinese softball player who competed for China at the 2004 Summer Olympics and 2008 Summer Olympics.

== Biography ==
Li is a left-handed pitcher, which the China Times said made her pitches hard for batters to hit. Her pitches could reach up to 100 kilometres per hour (62 mph). She pitched at the 2002 Asian Games softball competition. Li competed for the Chinese team in the 2004 Olympic softball competition, where they finished fourth. The Shanghai Morning Post in 2005 said, "Li Qi is currently recognized as one of the best pitchers in China after Wang Lihong." Like the other Chinese women's softball players on her team, Li made a monthly income of ¥1,000 (US$125) in 2006 so needed to be frugal according to the Yangtse Evening Post. The team had a yearly training camp at Haigeng (Chinese: 海埂) in Jinning, Kunming. When each training session ended, Li would ask her Beijing teammates to visit market stalls outside the Temple of Heaven to purchase pairs of softball socks for ¥5 ($1) each on the grey market. Before saying goodbye to them, she would always remind them, "Don't forget to bargain."

Li pitched in the 2008 Olympic softball competition. By striking out 10 batters, she had the third most strikeouts at the Olympics (an American pitcher and a Canadian pitchers ranked before her). Her earned run average (ERA) ranked fifth during the Olympics. Of all Chinese players at the time, she had the smallest ERA. The team finished in sixth place. For her performance during the Olympics, the city of Dalian awarded her a bonus of ¥40,000 ($5,017). Several Japanese softball teams asked her to become a member of their team when she was still on the China women's national softball team but she declined.

Li pitched during 2010 Asian Games softball competition, where her team received a silver medal. She competed for the Liaoning team at the 2010 Straits Cup (simplified Chinese: 海峡杯; traditional Chinese: 海峽盃) in Taiwan, the first time she had visited the country. While pitching against the National Taiwan University of Sport, Li had 10 strikeouts. During the 2013 Straits Cup held in Taiwan, Li defeated the team from National Taiwan Normal University in five innings by striking out nine batters. She lost the championship game to the Taichung team after making numerous defense errors. During the softball competition at the 2014 Asian Games, she was the pitcher and the team received a bronze medal. Li competed at the 2017 National Games of China, 2017 Asian Women's Softball Championship and the 2018 Women's Softball World Championship.
