= Murder of Alexandra Zapp =

2002 murder in Bridgewater, Massachusetts, US

Coordinates: 41.947634°N 71.022924°W

Alexandra Zapp
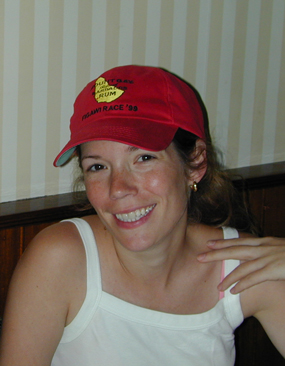
- Born: August 24, 1971; Portland, Oregon, U.S.
- Died: July 18, 2002 (aged 30); Bridgewater, Massachusetts, U.S.
- Cause of death: Homicide
- Education: University of Oregon
- Known for: Murder victim

Alexandra Nicole Zapp (August 24, 1971 – July 18, 2002) was an American woman who was murdered in the women's room of a Burger King rest stop in Bridgewater, Massachusetts on July 18, 2002. Section 121 of the Adam Walsh Child Protection and Safety Act (P.L. 109-248) is named the "Megan Nicole Kanka and Alexandra Nicole Zapp Community Notification Program" after her and another victim. Massachusetts' Sexually Dangerous Persons Law is informally called the "Ally Zapp" Law.

== Background ==
Alexandra Zapp was born and raised in Portland, Oregon, the daughter of Raymond and Andrea (née Casanova) Zapp. Zapp left Portland in 1988 to attend Miss Porter's, a boarding school in Connecticut. After completing her high school education, she returned to her native Oregon and attended the University of Oregon for two years. She then accepted an editing position that took her to Boston, Massachusetts.

In Boston, Zapp volunteered for charitable organizations including The French Library, The Boston Ballet and Courageous Sailing Center where she donated her time teaching children to sail.

In November 2001, she decided to make a move to Newport, Rhode Island to take a job with US Sailing. At the time of her death, she had plans to relocate to New Zealand to realize a dream of sailing on an America's Cup boat.

== Murder ==
Zapp was on her way home to Newport, Rhode Island from a charity event in Boston when she stopped at the rest area on Massachusetts Route 24 in Bridgewater around midnight. Burger King employee and repeat sex offender Paul Leahy, 40, watched and waited as Zapp entered the women's bathroom. According to police reports and a later confession by the killer, when Zapp opened the door to leave the restroom, Leahy stood in the doorway with a knife in his right hand and shoved her back inside. Zapp pleaded with Leahy, and then fought for her life as he proceeded to stab her in the chest a total of six times. Zapp also sustained defensive knife wounds to her arm, wrist, hand, and chin.

In the nearby men's room, off-duty state police lieutenant Stephen O'Reilly heard Zapp's muffled screaming. As he approached the women's room door, he saw red puddles. With his gun drawn, he stepped inside to find Leahy standing next to the sink covered in blood.

== Trial ==
Leahy was charged with first-degree murder, kidnapping, armed robbery, and armed assault with intent to rob. Prosecutor Frank Middleton said the evidence was overwhelming, thanks mostly to the testimony of Lt. Stephen O'Reilly, the trooper who caught Leahy in the act of cleaning up after the murder.

Also key to the prosecution's case was a statement Leahy made to police, in which he confessed that he intentionally stabbed the young woman. After initially conceding that he had only stabbed Zapp twice in the arm, he admitted to stabbing her in the chest when he was confronted with autopsy results.

Leahy's criminal history dates back to 1981, with a history of sexual offenses beginning in 1984. Some of his victims were as young as 13 years old. With a mountain of evidence facing his client, defense lawyer Frank Spillane did not make a case to get his client acquitted of all charges, but instead concentrated his efforts on proving Zapp's death was not an intentional act of murder.

Spillane argued that his client's actions were in response to the circumstances confronting him. He said that his client did not plan, plot or lie in wait for Alexandra Zapp.

When Leahy was waiting for Zapp to come out of the restroom, Spillane said, he was deciding whether or not to rob her. Spillane said his client did not intend to hurt Zapp, and that the battle in the bathroom erupted spontaneously. He alleged the defendant was simply reacting to a situation that had spiraled out of control.

On September 24, 2003, Paul Leahy was found guilty of first-degree murder and sentenced to life without parole.

== Legacy ==
After Zapp's murder, her mother and stepfather, Andrea Casanova and Steven Stiles, founded The ALLY Foundation in Boston in November 2002. The ALLY Foundation is a 501(c)(3) charitable organization whose mission is to prevent opportunities for violent sex offenses, to educate the public and advocate for necessary changes in culture, attitude and policy. One of the most critical responsibilities of The ALLY Foundation is to work for more comprehensive and evidence-based policies to effectively manage sex offenders as they move through the criminal justice system and the community.

The ALLY Foundation is also known for their "for a Change" fund raising events such as the annual Sail for a Change Flip Flop Regatta held in Boston Harbor, Run for a Change (held in conjunction with the Boston Marathon), Ride for a Change, Faces for a Change, and Newport for a Change.
