= Yu Huili =

Chinese softball player

Yu Huili (born October 5, 1982, in Sichuan) is a female Chinese softball player. She was part of the 4th-placed team at the 2006 World Championship.

She competed for Team China at the Beijing 2008 Olympics held in Beijing.
