= Hsu Hsiu-ling =

Taiwanese softball player

Hsu Hsiu-Ling (born February 9, 1982, in Nantou) is a Taiwanese softball player. She competed for Chinese Taipei at the 2008 Summer Olympics.
