= Tan Ying (softball) =

Chinese softball player

Medal record

Women's softball

Representing China

Asian Games
Silver medal – second place	2010 Guangzhou	Softball
Bronze medal – third place	2006 Doha	Softball

Tan Ying (born May 4, 1982, in Shanghai) is a female Chinese softball player. She was part of the fourth place team at the 2006 World Championship.After retiring, Tan Ying served as the baseball and softball program supervisor at the Shanghai Youth Training Management Center and as deputy director of the competition department

She competed for Team China at the 2008 Summer Olympics in Beijing.
