= Wu Di (softball) =

Chinese softball player

Wu Di (simplified Chinese: 吴迪; traditional Chinese: 吳迪; pinyin: Wú Dí; born March 1, 1982, in Panzhihua, Sichuan) is a female Chinese softball player who competed at the 2004 Summer Olympics and again in the 2008 Summer Olympics

In the 2004 Olympic softball competition she finished fourth with the Chinese team. She played four matches as infielder.
