= Sun Li (writer, born 1913) =

Chinese writer

- 孙犁
- Born: 孙树勋; May 11, 1913; Anping County, Hebei, China
- Died: July 11, 2002 (aged 89); Tianjin, China
- Occupation: Novelist
- Writing career
- Language: Chinese
- Period: 1943 - 2002
- Genres: Novel, short story
- Notable works: Stormy Years, Lotus Creek and Other Stories

Sun Li (simplified Chinese: 孙犁; traditional Chinese: 孫犁; 11 May 1913 – 11 July 2002) was a Chinese writer from Hebei Province. He is most famous for the short story collection Lotus Creek and Other Stories, and the novels Stormy Years, and The Early Life of Tiemu. Sun Li is often associated with Lake Baiyangdian, the area around which the stories in Lotus Creek are set. Some of these stories are famous for being included in school textbooks.

== Works ==
The stories in the Lotus Creek collection are primarily set during the Second Sino-Japanese War and the Chinese Civil War. Below is a summary of some stories in the collection:

“The Reed Marshes” is about an old man who ferries supplies through a Japanese blockade to guerillas, ferries two young girls, one gets hit by a bullet and he takes out his revenge on a small group of Japanese soldiers

"Lotus Creek" is about women who are left behind by their husbands who go off to fight. They try to follow their men to give them more supplies, but get chased by a Japanese ship, which is then ambushed by a squad including their husbands.

"A Hamlet Battle" is, as is clear from the title, about resistance from a hamlet with the Chinese repelling a Japanese advance. It includes Chinese forces assisted by a local boy who knows his way around tunnels. The Chinese forces are victorious.

"Caiputai" is about a Town where collaborators drive the price of grain high and buy goods cheap, but the people resist and steal a shipment of grain as part of the resistance

In "Parting advice" a soldier gets leave from his leader to visit his family for one night. It is a touching reunion, but his father has died in the eight years he’s been away and he has a child he has never met. In the morning his wife takes him by sled back to his battalion.

"Honor": Yuansheng is told by Xiumei that a nationalist deserter is alone with a gun so they steal it and Yuansheng goes off to war where he is fighting for 10 years. First the Japanese and then the nationalists. He is married before he leaves to a good-for-nothing who doesn’t want to wait for him. His wife gets in a fight with Xiumei and gets a divorce. Xiumei takes care of Yuansheng’s parents. He finally comes back and it seems as if this is a match made in heaven.

"Haoerliang": A doctor and nurse take their wounded up into the mountains where the village chairwoman helps them. They fear the Japanese but also the landlords.

"The Guide" is about a courageous female guide and the resistance from a mountain village.
