= Sun Li (softball) =

Chinese softball player

Sun Li (simplified Chinese: 孙莉; traditional Chinese: 孫莉; pinyin: Sūn Lì; born January 6, 1981, in Chongqing) is a female Chinese softball player. She was part of the bronze medal-winning team at the 2006 Asian Games and the fourth-placed team at the 2006 World Championship.

She competed for Team China at the 2008 Summer Olympics in Beijing.
