= Li Chiu-ching =

Taiwanese softball player

Li Chiu-Ching (李 秋靜, born October 9, 1982, in Miaoli) is a Taiwanese softball player. She competed for Chinese Taipei at the 2004 and 2008 Summer Olympics.
