= Chueh Ming-hui =

Taiwanese softball player

Chueh Ming-Hui (born November 22, 1984) is a Taiwanese softball player. She competed for Chinese Taipei at the 2008 Summer Olympics.
