= Wen Li-hsiu =

Taiwanese softball player

Wen Li-hsiu (born 11 November 1982) is a Taiwanese softball player. She competed for Chinese Taipei at the 2008 Summer Olympics.
