= Satoko Mabuchi =

Japanese softball player

Medal record

Women's softball

Representing Japan

Olympic Games
| Gold medal – first place | 2008 Beijing | Team competition |

Satoko Mabuchi (馬渕 智子, Mabuchi Satoko; born 17 February 1982) is a Japanese softball player who won the gold medal at the 2008 Summer Olympics. She plays as an outfielder.
