= Rei Nishiyama =

Japanese softball player

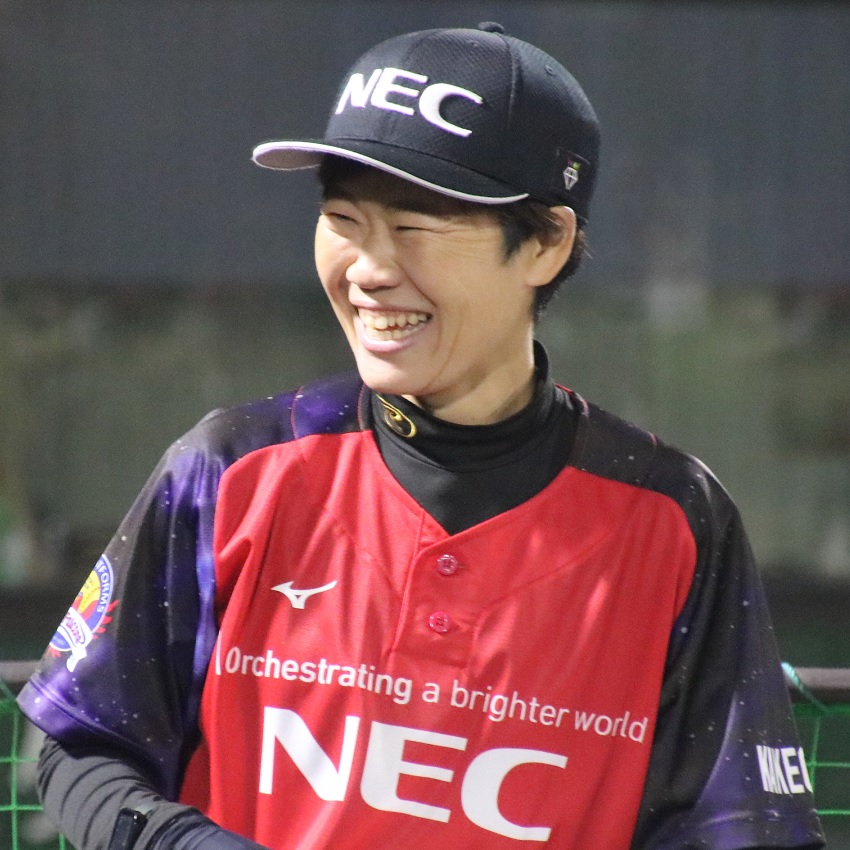

Medal record

Women's softball

Representing Japan

Olympic Games
Gold medal – first place	2008 Beijing	Team competition

Rei Nishiyama (西山 麗, Nishiyama Rei; born 8 March 1984 in Yokosuka, Kanagawa) is a Japanese softball player who won the gold medal at the 2008 Summer Olympics.
