= Ayumi Karino =

Japanese softball player

Medal record

Women's softball

Representing Japan

Olympic Games
Gold medal – first place	2008 Beijing	Team competition

Ayumi Karino (狩野 亜由美, Karino Ayumi) (born 6 November 1984 in Hyogo Prefecture) is a Japanese softball player who won the gold medal at the 2008 Summer Olympics.
