= Venezuela at the 2008 Summer Olympics =

- IOC code: VEN
- NOC: Venezuelan Olympic Committee
- Website: cov.com.ve (in Spanish)

in Beijing
- Competitors: 108 in 21 sports
- Flag bearers: María Soto (opening); Dalia Contreras (closing)
- Medals Ranked 80th: Gold 0 Silver 0 Bronze 1 Total 1

Summer Olympics appearances (overview)
- 1948; 1952; 1956; 1960; 1964; 1968; 1972; 1976; 1980; 1984; 1988; 1992; 1996; 2000; 2004; 2008; 2012; 2016; 2020; 2024; 2028

Venezuela competed in the 2008 Summer Olympics which was held in Beijing, People's Republic of China from August 8 to August 24, 2008.

== Medalists ==
Medal	Name	Sport	Event	Date
Bronze	Dalia Contreras	Taekwondo	Women's 49 kg	August 20

== Archery ==
Athlete	Event	Ranking round		Round of 64	Round of 32	Round of 16	Quarterfinals	Semifinals	Final / BM	
Athlete	Event	Score	Seed	Opposition Score	Opposition Score	Opposition Score	Opposition Score	Opposition Score	Opposition Score	Rank
Leidys Brito	Women's individual	628	36	Wu H-J (TPE) (29); W 104–98	Narimanidze (GEO) (4); L 98–111	Did not advance				

== Athletics ==
Key

- Note – Ranks given for track events are within the athlete's heat only
- Q = Qualified for the next round
- q = Qualified for the next round as a fastest loser or, in field events, by position without achieving the qualifying target
- NR = National record
- N/A = Round not applicable for the event
- Bye = Athlete not required to compete in round

Men

Athlete	Event	Heat		Quarterfinal		Semifinal		Final	
Athlete	Event	Result	Rank	Result	Rank	Result	Rank	Result	Rank
José Acevedo	200 m	21.06	5	Did not advance					
Luis Fonseca	Marathon	—N/a						DNF	
Edward Villanueva	800 m	1:47.64	6	—N/a		Did not advance			

Women

Athlete	Event	Qualification		Final	
Athlete	Event	Distance	Position	Distance	Position
María González	Javelin throw	50.51	48	Did not advance	

== Boxing ==
Venezuela qualified six boxers for the Olympic boxing tournament. Manzanilla and Blanco were the first to qualify, earning spots at the 2007 World Championships. Bermúdez, Sánchez, and González qualified at the first American qualifying tournament. Payares was the last to qualify, doing so at the second qualifier.

The team's record in Beijing was 3–6, with only Héctor Manzanilla winning more than one bout. Both Manzanilla and Alfonso Blanco made the quarterfinals, but neither won their bout.

Athlete	Event	Round of 32	Round of 16	Quarterfinals	Semifinals	Final	
Athlete	Event	Opposition Result	Opposition Result	Opposition Result	Opposition Result	Opposition Result	Rank
Eduard Bermúdez	Light flyweight	Zou (CHN); L 2–11	Did not advance				
Héctor Manzanilla	Bantamweight	I Samir (GHA); W 13–10	Han S-C (KOR); W 17–6	Julie (MRI); L 9–13	Did not advance		
Jonny Sánchez	Light welterweight	Bye	Sapiyev (KAZ); L 3–22	Did not advance			
Alfonso Blanco	Middleweight	Bye	Casimiro (DOM); W 18–7	Sutherland (IRL); L 1–11	Did not advance		
Luis González	Light heavyweight	Bye	Szellő (HUN); L RSC	Did not advance			
José Payares	Super heavyweight	—N/a	Ouatah (ALG); L 5-7	Did not advance			

== Canoeing ==
=== Sprint ===
Both Venezuelan boats progressed to the semifinals, but finished last and did not advance to the final.

Athlete	Event	Heats		Semifinals		Final	
Athlete	Event	Time	Rank	Time	Rank	Time	Rank
José Giovanni Ramos; Gabriel Rodríguez	Men's K-2 500 m	1:34.220	8 QS	1:37.285	9	Did not advance	
Zulmarys Sánchez	Women's K-1 500 m	1:57.728	7 QS	2:02.764	9	Did not advance	

Qualification Legend: QS = Qualify to semi-final; QF = Qualify directly to final

== Cycling ==
=== Road ===
The top finish from a Venezuelan road racer was the 30th place from Jackson Rodríguez in the men's race. Neither woman finished within ten minutes of the leader.

Athlete	Event	Time	Rank
Jackson Rodríguez	Men's road race	6:26:17	30
Danielys García	Women's road race	3:43:25	54
Angie González	Women's road race	3:43:25	57

=== BMX ===
Venezuela sent former cruiser (22") world champion Jonathan Suárez to compete in BMX. He finished 8th in seeding, but finished 8th in the first of three quarterfinal races and could not advance.

Athlete	Event	Seeding		Quarterfinals		Semifinals		Final	
Athlete	Event	Result	Rank	Points	Rank	Points	Rank	Result	Rank
Jonathan Suárez	Men's BMX	36.325	8	17	5	Did not advance			

== Diving ==
Ramón Fumadó was in position to qualify for the semifinals after the first two dives, but fell behind and finished ten points short.

Men

Athlete	Events	Preliminaries		Semifinals		Final	
Athlete	Events	Points	Rank	Points	Rank	Points	Rank
Ramón Fumadó	3 m springboard	419.05	21	Did not advance			

== Equestrian ==
=== Show jumping ===
Athlete	Horse	Event	Qualification								Final					Total	
Athlete	Horse	Event	Round 1		Round 2			Round 3			Round A		Round B			Total	
Athlete	Horse	Event	Penalties	Rank	Penalties	Total	Rank	Penalties	Total	Rank	Penalties	Rank	Penalties	Total	Rank	Penalties	Rank
Pablo Barrios	Sinatra	Individual	9	=52	14	23	50 Q	20	43	=44	Did not advance					43	=44

== Fencing ==
Venezuela sent a seven-person fencing team to Beijing, but they combined to win just two matches. Considering the team included the #1 ranked men's épée fencer, Silvio Fernández, this was somewhat of a disappointment. Fernandez won his opening match, but then lost to a Hungarian opponent in the second round. The other win came from the men's épée team, who lost their quarterfinal, but won a placement match against Korea before ending up in 6th place overall.

Men

Athlete	Event	Round of 64	Round of 32	Round of 16	Quarterfinal	Semifinal	Final / BM	
Athlete	Event	Opposition Score	Opposition Score	Opposition Score	Opposition Score	Opposition Score	Opposition Score	Rank
Silvio Fernández	Individual épée	Bye	Inostroza (CHI); W 15–11	Boczko (HUN); L 9–15	Did not advance			
Rubén Limardo	Individual épée	Bye	Chumak (UKR); L 13–15	Did not advance				
Wolfgang Mejías	Individual épée	Torkildsen (NOR); L 11–12	Did not advance					
Silvio Fernández; Francisco Limardo; Rubén Limardo; Wolfgang Mejías	Team épée	—N/a		Bye	France; L 33–45	Classification semi-final South Korea; W 45–38	5th place final Hungary; L 25–40	6
Carlos Bravo	Individual sabre	Koniusz (POL); L 10–15	Did not advance					

Women

Athlete	Event	Round of 64	Round of 32	Round of 16	Quarterfinal	Semifinal	Final / BM	
Athlete	Event	Opposition Score	Opposition Score	Opposition Score	Opposition Score	Opposition Score	Opposition Score	Rank
María Martínez	Individual épée	—N/a	Lamon (SUI); L 9–15	Did not advance				
Mariana González	Individual foil	Bye	Varga (HUN); L 2–15	Did not advance				
Alejandra Benítez	Individual sabre	Bye	Jóźwiak (POL); L 11–15	Did not advance				

== Gymnastics ==
=== Artistic ===
Venezuela sent two gymnasts to Beijing, with José Luis Fuentes managing to make the final in both the men's all-around and pommel horse events. Fuentes finished last of the finalists in the pommel horse final and 22nd of 24 in the all-around final. Jessica López did not advance to a final.

Men

Athlete	Event	Qualification								Final							
Athlete	Event	Apparatus						Total	Rank	Apparatus						Total	Rank
Athlete	Event	F	PH	R	V	PB	HB	Total	Rank	F	PH	R	V	PB	HB	Total	Rank
José Luis Fuentes	All-around	14.150	15.525	14.850	15.675	15.375	14.750	90.325	15 Q	14.175	13.650	13.900	15.250	15.175	14.150	86.300	22
José Luis Fuentes	Pommel horse	—N/a	15.525	—N/a				15.525	2 Q	—N/a	14.650	—N/a				14.650	8

Women

Athlete	Event	Qualification						Final					
Athlete	Event	Apparatus				Total	Rank	Apparatus				Total	Rank
Athlete	Event	F	V	UB	BB	Total	Rank	F	V	UB	BB	Total	Rank
Jessica López	All-around	13.450	13.800	14.375	14.050	56.175	43	Did not advance					

== Judo ==
Seven judokas represented Venezuela in Beijing, putting up an overall record of 6–10. None advanced beyond the quarterfinals in the main draw, and only Flor Velázquez progressed to the repechage semifinals, but lost to a Kazakhstani opponent, falling one bout short of a chance at a medal.

Men

Athlete	Event	Preliminary	Round of 32	Round of 16	Quarterfinals	Semifinals	Repechage 1	Repechage 2	Repechage 3	Final / BM	
Athlete	Event	Opposition Result	Opposition Result	Opposition Result	Opposition Result	Opposition Result	Opposition Result	Opposition Result	Opposition Result	Opposition Result	Rank
Javier Guédez	−60 kg	Bye	Techov (LTU); W 1000–0000	Williams-Murray (USA); W 1000–0000	Houkes (NED); L 0001–0010	Did not advance	Bye	Will (CAN); L 0000–1000	Did not advance		
Ludwig Ortíz	−66 kg	Dias (POR); L 0001–0010	Did not advance								
Richard Leon	−73 kg	—N/a	Si Rg (CHN); L 0000–0001	Did not advance							
José Camacho	−90 kg	—N/a	Grekov (UKR); W 1000–0000	Santos (BRA); L 0000–1000	Did not advance						
Albenis Rosales	−100 kg	—N/a	Jang S (KOR); L 0001–1010	Did not advance							

Women

Athlete	Event	Round of 32	Round of 16	Quarterfinals	Semifinals	Repechage 1	Repechage 2	Repechage 3	Final / BM	
Athlete	Event	Opposition Result	Opposition Result	Opposition Result	Opposition Result	Opposition Result	Opposition Result	Opposition Result	Opposition Result	Rank
Flor Velázquez	−52 kg	An K (PRK); L 0001–1000	Did not advance			Mestre (CUB); W 0001–0000	Kaliyeva (KAZ); L 0000–0010	Did not advance		
Ysis Barreto	−63 kg	Hane (SEN); W 1012–0000	Tanimoto (JPN); L 0000–1000	Did not advance		Bye	Kong J (KOR); W 1001–0100	Heill (AUT); L 0001–0030	Did not advance	

== Rowing ==
Venezuela had qualified 1 boat in rowing.

Men

Athlete	Event	Heats		Quarterfinals		Semifinals		Final	
Athlete	Event	Time	Rank	Time	Rank	Time	Rank	Time	Rank
Dhiso Hernández	Single sculls	7:54.52	5 SE/F	Bye		7:18.85	1 FE	7:05.12	27

Qualification Legend: FA=Final A (medal); FB=Final B (non-medal); FC=Final C (non-medal); FD=Final D (non-medal); FE=Final E (non-medal); FF=Final F (non-medal); SA/B=Semifinals A/B; SC/D=Semifinals C/D; SE/F=Semifinals E/F; QF=Quarterfinals; R=Repechage

== Sailing ==
None of the three Venezuelan boats participating in Olympic sailing in Beijing qualified for a medal race, with the top finish being 26th from Johnny Bilbao in the Finn class.

Men

Athlete	Event	Race											Net points	Final rank
Athlete	Event	1	2	3	4	5	6	7	8	9	10	M*	Net points	Final rank
Carlos Julio Flores	RS:X	32	33	33	~~35~~	21	22	27	28	22	14	EL	232	29
José Miguel Ruiz	Laser	39	~~40~~	23	29	40	29	33	32	24	CAN	EL	249	39

Open

Athlete	Event	Race											Net points	Final rank
Athlete	Event	1	2	3	4	5	6	7	8	9	10	M*	Net points	Final rank
Jhonny Bilbao	Finn	~~26~~	12	25	23	26	25	20	18	CAN	CAN	EL	175	26

M = Medal race; EL = Eliminated – did not advance into the medal race; CAN = Race cancelled;

== Shooting ==
Women

Athlete	Event	Qualification		Final	
Athlete	Event	Points	Rank	Points	Rank
Diliana Méndez	10 m air rifle	386	43	Did not advance	
Diliana Méndez	50 m rifle 3 positions	568	39	Did not advance	

== Softball ==
The Venezuelan women's softball team qualified for the Olympics by winning the Pan-American qualifying tournament at home Valencia. At the Olympics, they initially struggled, losing their first three games by a combined score of 21–1, but then won two straight games without conceding a run, leaving them at 2-3 and in the hunt for a medal round place. However, they lost two difficult matches against eventual medal winners to close out the round robin, and fell one loss short of a medal round spot.

Team roster

- Denisse Fuenmayor
- Geraldine Puertas
- Jineth Pimentel
- Johana Gómez
- María Soto
- Marianella Castellanos
- Mayles Rodríguez
- Rubilena Rojas
- Yaciey Sojo
- Yurubi Alicart
- Yusmary Pérez
- Zuleyma Cirimele
- Maribel Riera
- Mariangee Bogado
- Bheiglys Mujica

Results

Team	W	L	RS	RA	WIN%	GB	Tiebreaker
United States	7	0	53	1	1.000	-	-
Japan	6	1	23	13	.857	1	-
Australia	5	2	30	11	.714	2	-
Canada	3	4	17	23	.429	4	-
Chinese Taipei	2	5	10	23	.286	5	2-0 vs. CHN/VEN
China	2	5	19	21	.286	5	1-1 vs. TPE/VEN
Venezuela	2	5	15	35	.286	5	0-2 vs. CHN/TPE
Netherlands	1	6	8	48	.143	6	-

Team	1	2	3	4	5	6	7	R	H	E
United States	0	4	2	5	0	X	X	11	11	0
Venezuela	0	0	0	0	0	X	X	0	0	2
WP: Jennie Finch(1-0) LP: Johana Gómez(0-1); Home runs: USA: Natasha Watley(1), Caitlin Lowe(1), Crystl Bustos(1); VEN: None

Team	1	2	3	4	5	6	7	R	H	E
China	1	0	1	0	3	1	1	7	10	1
Venezuela	0	0	0	1	0	0	0	1	6	0
WP: Wei Lu(1-0) LP: Mariangee Bogado(0-1); Home runs: CHN: Yanhong Yu(1); VEN: None

Team	1	2	3	4	5	6	7	R	H	E
Chinese Taipei	2	0	0	1	0	0	X	3	6	0
Venezuela	0	0	0	0	0	0	0	0	3	2
WP: Chia-Yen Wu(1-1) LP: Johana Gómez(0-2); Home runs: TPE: Hsueh-Mei Lu(1); VEN: None

Team	1	2	3	4	5	6	7	R	H	E
Venezuela	3	3	0	2	X	X	X	8	7	0
Netherlands	0	0	0	0	0	X	X	0	1	0
WP: Mariangee Bogado(1-1) LP: Kristi de Varies(0-3)

Team	1	2	3	4	5	6	7	R	H	E
Venezuela	1	0	0	1	0	0	0	2	4	0
Canada	0	0	0	0	0	0	0	0	5	0
WP: Mariangee Bogado(2-1) LP: Danielle Lawrie(1-1); Home runs: VEN: Yuruby Alicart(1); CAN: None

Team	1	2	3	4	5	6	7	R	H	E
Venezuela	0	0	1	1	0	0	0	2	7	0
Japan	0	0	0	1	4	0	X	5	9	0
WP: Hiroko Sakai(3-0) LP: Mariangee Bogado(2-2); Home runs: VEN: None; JPN: Satoko Mabuchi(3), Eri Yamada (1)

Team	1	2	3	4	5	6	7	R	H	E
Venezuela	0	0	0	0	2	X	X	2	1	0
Australia	4	1	0	4	0	X	X	9	8	0
WP: Justine Smethurst(2-0) LP: Mariangee Bogado(2-3); Home runs: VEN: None; AUS: Danielle Stewart(1)

== Swimming ==
Venezuela sent a thirteen-person swimming team to compete in eighteen events in Beijing. In the pool, only two progressed to a semifinal, and none made a final. The best finishes for the team came in the two open water events, as Erwin Maldonado finished 10th in the men's race, and Andreina Pinto finished 9th in the women's race.

Men

Athlete	Event	Heat		Semifinal		Final	
Athlete	Event	Time	Rank	Time	Rank	Time	Rank
Crox Acuña	200 m freestyle	1:50.52	42	Did not advance			
Octavio Alesi	100 m butterfly	53.58	38	Did not advance			
Leopoldo Andara	200 m breaststroke	2:17.77	50	Did not advance			
Leopoldo Andara	200 m individual medley	2:05.71	43	Did not advance			
Jonathan Camacho	50 m freestyle	22.87	47	Did not advance			
Erwin Maldonado	10 km open water	—N/a				1:52:13.6	10
Alexis Márquez	200 m butterfly	2:01.25	36	Did not advance			
Ricardo Monasterio	1500 m freestyle	15:45.98	35	—N/a		Did not advance	
Albert Subirats	100 m freestyle	48.97	21	Did not advance			
Albert Subirats	100 m butterfly	51.71	8 Q	51.82	11	Did not advance	
Daniele Tirabassi	400 m freestyle	3:53.26	31	—N/a		Did not advance	

Qualifiers for the latter rounds of all events are decided on a time only basis, therefore positions shown are overall results versus competitors in all heats.

Women

Athlete	Event	Heat		Semifinal		Final	
Athlete	Event	Time	Rank	Time	Rank	Time	Rank
Andreína Pinto	800 m freestyle	8:30:30	24	—N/a		Did not advance	
Andreína Pinto	10 km open water	—N/a				1:59:40.0	9
Yanel Pinto	400 m freestyle	4:18.09	32	—N/a		Did not advance	
Arlene Semeco	50 m freestyle	24.98	10 Q	25.05	15	Did not advance	
Arlene Semeco	100 m freestyle	55.70	30	Did not advance			
Erin Volcán	100 m backstroke	1:03.90	42	Did not advance			
Erin Volcán	200 m backstroke	2:15.58	32	Did not advance			

Qualifiers for the latter rounds of all events are decided on a time only basis, therefore positions shown are overall results versus competitors in all heats.

== Table tennis ==
Fabiola Ramos won her preliminary round match, but lost to a North Korean opponent in the first round.

Athlete	Event	Preliminary round	Round 1	Round 2	Round 3	Round 4	Quarterfinals	Semifinals	Final / BM	
Athlete	Event	Opposition Result	Opposition Result	Opposition Result	Opposition Result	Opposition Result	Opposition Result	Opposition Result	Opposition Result	Rank
Fabiola Ramos	Women's singles	Long (CAN); W 4–1	Kim J (PRK); L 0–4	Did not advance						

== Taekwondo ==
Venezuela won their first Olympic medal in Taekwondo in Athens, and though Adriana Carmona, who won that medal, lost her first round match in Beijing, Venezuela was able to win another medal in 2008. Dalia Contreras won her first two matches to make the semifinals in the women's under 49 kg division, where she lost a tied match on a judges decision. Still, her semifinals appearance allowed her to progress directly to the bronze medal match, where she beat a Kenyan opponent to claim Venezuela's only medal of the 2008 Games. Overall, the four person Taekwondo team went 4-4, with three of the four wins from Contreras.

Athlete	Event	Round of 16	Quarterfinals	Semifinals	Repechage	Bronze Medal	Final	
Athlete	Event	Opposition Result	Opposition Result	Opposition Result	Opposition Result	Opposition Result	Opposition Result	Rank
Carlos Vásquez	Men's −80 kg	Baguissi (GAB); W 5–0	Cook (GBR); L 2–5	Did not advance				
Juan Díaz	Men's +80 kg	Zrouri (MAR); L KO	Did not advance					
Dalia Contreras	Women's −49 kg	Gülec (GER); W 4–2	Craig (USA); W 3–2	Puedpong (THA); L 2–2 SUP	Bye	Alango (KEN); W 2–0	Did not advance	3rd place, bronze medalist(s)
Adriana Carmona	Women's +67 kg	Chen Z (CHN); L 1–3	Did not advance					

== Tennis ==
Milagros Sequera was trailing by a set and a game when she retired from her first round match.

Athlete	Event	Round of 64	Round of 32	Round of 16	Quarterfinals	Semifinals	Final / BM	
Athlete	Event	Opposition Score	Opposition Score	Opposition Score	Opposition Score	Opposition Score	Opposition Score	Rank
Milagros Sequera	Women's singles	Bondarenko (UKR); L 3–6, 0–1^{r}	Did not advance					

== Volleyball ==
=== Indoor ===
Both Venezuelan volleyball teams won the South American Qualification tournament to earn their Olympic berths, but were less successful in Beijing. Between them, the two teams won just one out of ten matches, with the men's team beating Japan in straight sets. The men's team also forced a fifth set against both the American and Chinese teams, eventually finishing fifth in their group, while the women's team won only a single set and finished last in their group. The final ranking of the men's team was tied for 9th place, while that of the women's team was tied for 11th place.

==== Men's tournament ====
Roster

The following is the Venezuelan roster in the men's volleyball tournament of the 2008 Summer Olympics.

Head Coach: (Brazil) Ricardo Navajas

No.	Name	Date of birth	Height	Weight	Spike	Block	2008 club
3	Andy Rojas (c)	2 October 1977	1.97 m (6 ft 6 in)	95 kg (209 lb)	315 cm (124 in)	318 cm (125 in)	(Italy) Ermoli
4	Joel Silva (L)	14 September 1985	1.88 m (6 ft 2 in)	78 kg (172 lb)	334 cm (131 in)	329 cm (130 in)	(Venezuela) Apure
5	Rodman Valera	20 April 1982	1.88 m (6 ft 2 in)	82 kg (181 lb)	337 cm (133 in)	332 cm (131 in)	(Venezuela) Compoktuna
6	Carlos Luna	25 January 1981	1.94 m (6 ft 4 in)	85 kg (187 lb)	339 cm (133 in)	331 cm (130 in)	(Japan) Toyoda Gosei Trefuerza
7	Luis Díaz	20 August 1983	2.04 m (6 ft 8 in)	92 kg (203 lb)	349 cm (137 in)	342 cm (135 in)	(Italy) Tonno Calippo
10	Ronald Méndez	26 October 1982	2.03 m (6 ft 8 in)	84 kg (185 lb)	357 cm (141 in)	352 cm (139 in)	(Venezuela) Bolívar
11	Ernardo Gómez	30 July 1982	1.95 m (6 ft 5 in)	90 kg (200 lb)	355 cm (140 in)	350 cm (140 in)	(Japan) Toyoda Gosei Trefuerza
12	Carlos Tejeda	29 July 1980	1.98 m (6 ft 6 in)	90 kg (200 lb)	340 cm (130 in)	315 cm (124 in)	(Spain) CV Almería
13	Iván Márquez	4 October 1981	2.05 m (6 ft 9 in)	85 kg (187 lb)	339 cm (133 in)	333 cm (131 in)	(Netherlands) Verening
14	Thomas Ereu	25 October 1979	1.94 m (6 ft 4 in)	85 kg (187 lb)	352 cm (139 in)	345 cm (136 in)	(Italy) Taviano
17	Juan Carlos Blanco	27 July 1981	1.95 m (6 ft 5 in)	83 kg (183 lb)	341 cm (134 in)	336 cm (132 in)	(Venezuela) Karava
18	Freddy Cedeño	10 September 1981	2.05 m (6 ft 9 in)	95 kg (209 lb)	353 cm (139 in)	348 cm (137 in)	(Spain) Arona

Group play

Pos	Team	Pld	W	L	Pts	SPW	SPL	SPR	SW	SL	SR	Qualification
1	United States	5	5	0	10	460	371	1.240	15	4	3.750	Quarterfinals
2	Italy	5	4	1	9	439	401	1.095	13	6	2.167	Quarterfinals
3	Bulgaria	5	3	2	8	446	440	1.014	10	9	1.111	Quarterfinals
4	China	5	2	3	7	445	492	0.904	9	13	0.692	Quarterfinals
5	Venezuela	5	1	4	6	421	451	0.933	8	12	0.667	
6	Japan	5	0	5	5	392	448	0.875	4	15	0.267	

All times are China Standard Time (UTC+8).

10 August 2008; 12:35	United States	3–2	Venezuela	Capital Indoor Stadium, Beijing; Attendance: 11,000; Referees: Konstantin Tufekchiev (BUL), Umit Sokullu (TUR)
10 August 2008; 12:35	(25–18, 25–18, 22–25, 21–25, 15–10); Results Statistics			Capital Indoor Stadium, Beijing; Attendance: 11,000; Referees: Konstantin Tufekchiev (BUL), Umit Sokullu (TUR)

12 August 2008; 20:00	Venezuela	2–3	China	Capital Indoor Stadium, Beijing; Attendance: 12,500; Referees: Massimo Menghini (ITA), Konstantin Tufekchiev (BUL)
12 August 2008; 20:00	(21–25, 25–21, 25–16, 21–25, 14–16); Results Statistics			Capital Indoor Stadium, Beijing; Attendance: 12,500; Referees: Massimo Menghini (ITA), Konstantin Tufekchiev (BUL)

14 August 2008; 10:00	Italy	3–0	Venezuela	Beijing Institute of Technology Gymnasium, Beijing; Attendance: 3,300; Referees: Mohammad Shahmiri (IRI), Mitch Davidson (CAN)
14 August 2008; 10:00	(25–21, 25–20, 25–21); Results Statistics			Beijing Institute of Technology Gymnasium, Beijing; Attendance: 3,300; Referees: Mohammad Shahmiri (IRI), Mitch Davidson (CAN)

16 August 2008; 22:00	Venezuela	3–0	Japan	Capital Indoor Stadium, Beijing; Attendance: 7,500; Referees: Mitch Davidson (CAN), Victor Rodriguez (PUR)
16 August 2008; 22:00	(25–23, 25–21, 25–23) result statistics			Capital Indoor Stadium, Beijing; Attendance: 7,500; Referees: Mitch Davidson (CAN), Victor Rodriguez (PUR)

18 August 2008; 10:00	Bulgaria	3–1	Venezuela	Beijing Institute of Technology Gymnasium, Beijing; Attendance: 3,400; Referees: Mohammad Shahmiri (IRI), Laert Souza (BRA)
18 August 2008; 10:00	(23–25, 25–19, 25–16, 25–22) result statistics			Beijing Institute of Technology Gymnasium, Beijing; Attendance: 3,400; Referees: Mohammad Shahmiri (IRI), Laert Souza (BRA)

==== Women's tournament ====
Roster

The following is the Venezuelan roster in the women's volleyball tournament of the 2008 Summer Olympics.

Head Coach: (Cuba) Tomas Fernández

№	Name	Date of birth	Height	Weight	Spike	Block	2008 club
1	Yessica Paz	7 October 1989	1.92 m (6 ft 4 in)	72 kg (159 lb)	304 cm (120 in)	300 cm (120 in)	(Venezuela) Aragua
5	Génesis Franchesco	6 May 1990	1.74 m (5 ft 9 in)	58 kg (128 lb)	236 cm (93 in)	232 cm (91 in)	(Venezuela) Miranda
6	Maria Valero (L)	18 September 1991	1.65 m (5 ft 5 in)	60 kg (130 lb)	245 cm (96 in)	242 cm (95 in)	(Venezuela) Barinas
8	Amarilis Villar	30 March 1984	1.78 m (5 ft 10 in)	70 kg (150 lb)	280 cm (110 in)	276 cm (109 in)	(Venezuela) Vargas
9	Jayce Andrade (c)	19 May 1984	1.88 m (6 ft 2 in)	72 kg (159 lb)	300 cm (120 in)	296 cm (117 in)	(Venezuela) Zulia
10	Desiree Glod	28 September 1982	1.76 m (5 ft 9 in)	64 kg (141 lb)	305 cm (120 in)	301 cm (119 in)	(Spain) Ícaro Alaró
12	Gheraldine Quijada	31 January 1988	1.79 m (5 ft 10 in)	65 kg (143 lb)	286 cm (113 in)	282 cm (111 in)	(Venezuela) D.C.
13	Shirley Florian	27 July 1991	1.91 m (6 ft 3 in)	67 kg (148 lb)	305 cm (120 in)	301 cm (119 in)	(Venezuela) Zulia
14	Aleoscar Blanco	18 July 1987	1.89 m (6 ft 2 in)	75 kg (165 lb)	300 cm (120 in)	296 cm (117 in)	(Venezuela) Vargas
15	María José Pérez	18 March 1988	1.88 m (6 ft 2 in)	69 kg (152 lb)	300 cm (120 in)	296 cm (117 in)	(Puerto Rico) Llaneras de Toa Baja
17	Roslandy Acosta	25 February 1992	1.90 m (6 ft 3 in)	62 kg (137 lb)	295 cm (116 in)	291 cm (115 in)	(Venezuela) Vargas
18	Wendy Romero	8 February 1992	1.78 m (5 ft 10 in)	71 kg (157 lb)	295 cm (116 in)	291 cm (115 in)	(Venezuela) Cojedes

Group play

Pos	Team	Pld	W	L	Pts	SPW	SPL	SPR	SW	SL	SR	Qualification
1	Cuba	5	5	0	10	426	371	1.148	15	3	5.000	Quarterfinals
2	United States	5	4	1	9	459	441	1.041	12	9	1.333	Quarterfinals
3	China	5	3	2	8	467	395	1.182	13	7	1.857	Quarterfinals
4	Japan	5	2	3	7	381	389	0.979	7	11	0.636	Quarterfinals
5	Poland	5	1	4	6	441	445	0.991	9	12	0.750	
6	Venezuela	5	0	5	5	262	395	0.663	1	15	0.067	

All times are China Standard Time (UTC+8).

9 August 2008; 20:00	Venezuela	0–3	China	Capital Indoor Stadium; Attendance: 12,000; Referees: Dejan Jovanovic (Serbia), Patrick Deregnaucourt (France)
9 August 2008; 20:00	(13–25, 13–25, 18–25) result statistics			Capital Indoor Stadium; Attendance: 12,000; Referees: Dejan Jovanovic (Serbia), Patrick Deregnaucourt (France)

11 August 2008; 22:15	Japan	3–0	Venezuela	Capital Indoor Stadium; Attendance: 5,000; Referees: Karin Zahorcova (Czech Republic), Frans Loderus (Netherlands)
11 August 2008; 22:15	(25–12, 25–17, 25–12) result statistics			Capital Indoor Stadium; Attendance: 5,000; Referees: Karin Zahorcova (Czech Republic), Frans Loderus (Netherlands)

13 August 2008; 12:00	Venezuela	1–3	United States	Beijing Institute of Technology Gymnasium; Attendance: 3,400; Referees: Andrei Zenovich (Russia), Dejan Jovanovic (Serbia)
13 August 2008; 12:00	(17–25, 25–20, 14–25, 18–25) result statistics			Beijing Institute of Technology Gymnasium; Attendance: 3,400; Referees: Andrei Zenovich (Russia), Dejan Jovanovic (Serbia)

15 August 2008; 12:30	Venezuela	0–3	Poland	Capital Indoor Stadium; Attendance: 11,000; Referees: Janpen Jirakakul (Thailand), Humberto Salas (Mexico)
15 August 2008; 12:30	(12–25, 12–25, 20–25) result statistics			Capital Indoor Stadium; Attendance: 11,000; Referees: Janpen Jirakakul (Thailand), Humberto Salas (Mexico)

17 August 2008; 12:00	Cuba	3–0	Venezuela	Beijing Institute of Technology Gymnasium; Attendance: 3,500; Referees: Andrei Zenovich (Russia), Konstantin Tufekchiev (Bulgaria)
17 August 2008; 12:00	(25–20, 25–20, 25–19) result statistics			Beijing Institute of Technology Gymnasium; Attendance: 3,500; Referees: Andrei Zenovich (Russia), Konstantin Tufekchiev (Bulgaria)

== Weightlifting ==
The top finish from a Venezuelan lifter in Beijing was a 9th from Judith Chacon in the 53 kg division, but this was last placed finish in a division with few entrants. The next best finish came from Israel José Rubio in the men's 69 kg division, where he finished 13th. Three of the seven Venezuelan lifters did not complete a valid lift in one of the portions of the competition, and thus did not finish with a legal total.

Men

Athlete	Event	Snatch		Clean & Jerk		Total	Rank
Athlete	Event	Result	Rank	Result	Rank	Total	Rank
Israel José Rubio	−69 kg	139	10	167	12	306	13
José Ocando	−77 kg	140	19	182	15	322	17
Octavio Mejías	−77 kg	140	13	~~185~~	DNF	140	DNF
Herbys Márquez	−85 kg	~~152~~	DNF	—	—	—	DNF

Women

Athlete	Event	Snatch		Clean & Jerk		Total	Rank
Athlete	Event	Result	Rank	Result	Rank	Total	Rank
Judith Chacón	−53 kg	80	9	101	9	181	9
Solenny Villasmil	−63 kg	90	11	115	12	205	12
Iriner Jiménez	−69 kg	90	8	~~120~~	DNF	90	DNF

== Wrestling ==
The three Venezuelan wrestlers combined for a record of 0–4, with Luis Vivénez qualifying for the repechage, but losing his match to a Cuban athlete.

Key

- VT – Victory by Fall.
- PP – Decision by Points – the loser with technical points.
- PO – Decision by Points – the loser without technical points.

Men's freestyle

Athlete	Event	Qualification	Round of 16	Quarterfinal	Semifinal	Repechage 1	Repechage 2	Final / BM	
Athlete	Event	Opposition Result	Opposition Result	Opposition Result	Opposition Result	Opposition Result	Opposition Result	Opposition Result	Rank
Luis Vivénes	−96 kg	Bye	Tigiyev (KAZ); L 0–3 ^{PO}	Did not advance		Bye	Batista (CUB); L 1–3 ^{PP}	Did not advance	15

Women's freestyle

Athlete	Event	Qualification	Round of 16	Quarterfinal	Semifinal	Repechage 1	Repechage 2	Final / BM	
Athlete	Event	Opposition Result	Opposition Result	Opposition Result	Opposition Result	Opposition Result	Opposition Result	Opposition Result	Rank
Mayelis Caripá	−48 kg	Boubryemm (FRA); L 0–3 ^{PO}	Did not advance						14
Marcia Andrades	−55 kg	—N/a	Cristea (MDA); L 1–3 ^{PP}	Did not advance					11

== See also ==
- Venezuela at the 2007 Pan American Games
- Venezuela at the 2010 Central American and Caribbean Games
