= Softball at the 2006 Central American and Caribbean Games =

- Venue: Chiquinduira softball stadium

Softball at the 2006 Central American and Caribbean Games was held at the Chiquinduira softball stadium.

== Medalists ==
Event	Gold	Silver	Bronze
Men's Team	Venezuela; Elis Ugueto; Rodhil Coronel; Kerlis Rivero; Jose Cegarra; Tulio Linares; Jose Mannilo; Larry Escalona; Jesus Suniaga; Arturo Acacio; John García; Edwin Linares; Iran Páez; Jhon Zambrano; Ronny Machica; Richard Sanz; Rafael Flores; Lenin Rodríguez	Cuba; Alexei Tejeda; Jorge Reguera; Alain Roman; Pedro González; Maikel Ibarguen; Roberto Echarte; Eduardo Valdes; Juan Rodríguez; Surian Tellez; Alexis Navarro; Livan Zaldivar; Gusbel Plutin; Frank Pérez; Guillermo Márquez; Javier Caballero; Eduardo González; Alejandro Leal	Dominican Republic; Ariderson Polanco; Ambioris Guevara; Franklin Cuevas; Elvin Tatis; Santiago Paulino; Martinis Pérez; Luis Pérez; Félix Heredia; César Alexander; Leonardo Soto; Sergio la Hoz; Wilmy Cáceres; Manuel Cueto; Manuel Vargas; Cristian Fernández; Jorge Granagan; Andrés Veras
Women's Team	Venezuela; Yuruby Alicart; Mariangee Bogado; Marianella Castellanos; Zuleyma Ciremele; Mariela Espinoza; Denisse Fuenmayor; Johana Gómez; May Ocanto; Yusmary Pérez; Jineth Pimentel; Nidia Pineda; Geraldine Puertas; Maribel Riera; Zuleima Rodríguez; Rubilena Rojas; Yaicey Sojo; María Soto	Cuba; Miroslava Cumba; Lidisleidis Napoles; Marlen Bubaire; Yaniris Morales; Mailin Sanchez; Yaleisa Soto; Yanitza Aviles; Dianelli Wanton; Yanelis Rodríguez; Yuneisis Castillo; Vilma Álvarez; Diamela Puentes; Maibelis Iglesias; Yalexis Tamayo; Lidibet Castellon; Minielli Heredia; Yailin Lafa	Dominican Republic; Liseth Soto; Vitalia de la Rosa; Elizabeth Castillo; Leidi Paulino; Melisa Pérez; Melissa Penna; Josefina Mercedes; Claudia Batista; Raquel Mateo; Luisa Nuñez; Yaritza Rodríguez; Aloida Aquino; Mariela Martínez; Karina de los Santos; Caroline Fernández; Geovanny Nuñez; Idelisa Yoveres

== Medal table ==
Rank	Nation	Gold	Silver	Bronze	Total
1	Venezuela	2	0	0	2
2	Cuba	0	2	0	2
3	Dominican Republic	0	0	2	2
Totals (3 entries)		2	2	2	6
