= Softball at the 2010 Central American and Caribbean Games =

Event held in Mayagüez and Hormigueros, Puerto Rico

Tournament details
- Host country: Puerto Rico
- Dates: 18–30 July
- Teams: 13
- Defending champions: Venezuela (2006)

Final positions
- Champions: Venezuela (Men); Venezuela [Women)
- Runner-up: Dominican Republic (Men); Dominican Republic [Women)
- Third place: Mexico (Men); Guatemala [Women)

The softball competition at the 2010 Central American and Caribbean Games was held in Mayagüez and Hormigueros, Puerto Rico.

The men's tournament was scheduled to be held from 18–24 July at the Santiago Llorens Stadium in Mayagüez and the women's tournament was held from 23–30 July at the Julio Rivera Lopez Stadium, Hormigueros.

== Medalists ==
Event	Gold	Silver	Bronze
Men	Venezuela; Arturo Acacio; Erick Álvarez; Rafael Flores; Jhon García; Ramón Jones; Jorge Lima; Edwin Linares; Tulio Linares; Ronny Machicha; Jean Meléndez; Irán Páez; Luiger Pinto; Kerlis Rivero; Elis Ugueto; Erick Urbaneja; Joe Vilchez; Jhon Zambrano	Dominican Republic; Starling Batista; José Bueno; Manuel Cueto; Franklin Cuevas; Víctor Encarnación; Cristian Fernández; Manuel García; Sergio La Hoz; Juan Núñez; Richard Paulino; Martinis Pérez; Luis Pérez; Aridelso Polanco; Elvin Tatis; Miguel Ángel Turbi; César Valentín; Manuel Vargas	Mexico; José Águila; Sergio Almeida; Jesús Cardona; Miguel Ángel Carrillo; José Castro; Rubén Delgadillo; Eduardo Escobedo; Marco González; Carlos Hernández; Oscar Martínez; Alan Martínez; Mario Pérez; William Prishker; Miguel Ramos; Guillermo Ríos
Women	Venezuela; Yuruby Alicart; Mariangee Bogado; Ana Coscorrosa; Denisse Fuenmayor; Johana Gómez; Miriam Jiménez; Bheiglys Mujica; Jineth Pimentel; Anaís Puertas; Geraldine Puertas; Anylbell Ramírez; Maribel Riera; Cristina Rodríguez; Mayles Rodríguez; Rubilena Rojas; Yaicey Sojo; María Soto	Dominican Republic; Brenda Estepan; Dharianna Familia; Geraldina Feliz; Lorena Guerrero; Joshlyn Martínez; Josefina Mercedes; Geovanny Núñez; Luisa Núñez; Hannah Penna; Melissa Penna; Érika Pérez; Eduarda Rocha; Yaritza Rodríguez; Rosángela Rodríguez; Lidizeth Soto; Auraeliza Tejada; Altagracia Velgal	Guatemala; Alma Callejas; Irma Chajón; Stephanie Dacaret; Diana Gándara; Paula García; Silvana Girón; Jéssica Girón; Lizbeth Godoy; Walkyria González; María Mendizábal; Mariana Mendizábal; María Molina; Debbie Morales; Alejandra Pereira; María Ramos; Laura Rodríguez; Waleska Soto

== Men ==
=== Preliminary round ===
Teams	W	L	Pct.	GB	R	RA
Dominican Republic	5	0	1.000	—	31	6
Venezuela	3	2	0.600	2	24	18
Mexico	3	2	0.600	2	18	16
Puerto Rico	2	3	0.400	3	17	21
Guatemala	1	4	0.200	4	2	21
Panama	1	4	0.200	4	12	22

July 18, 2010	Dominican Republic	7 – 2	Mexico	Santiago Llorens Stadium, Mayagüez

July 18, 2010	Venezuela	8 – 0	Guatemala	Santiago Llorens Stadium, Mayagüez

July 18, 2010	Puerto Rico	4 – 6	Panama	Santiago Llorens Stadium, Mayagüez

July 19, 2010	Dominican Republic	6 – 0	Guatemala	Santiago Llorens Stadium, Mayagüez

July 19, 2010	Panama	5 – 10	Venezuela	Santiago Llorens Stadium, Mayagüez
July 19, 2010		Boxscore		Santiago Llorens Stadium, Mayagüez

July 19, 2010	Puerto Rico	4 – 9	Mexico	Santiago Llorens Stadium, Mayagüez
July 19, 2010		Boxscore		Santiago Llorens Stadium, Mayagüez

July 20, 2010	Mexico	3 – 1	Panama	Santiago Llorens Stadium, Mayagüez

July 20, 2010	Dominican Republic	9 – 2	Venezuela	Santiago Llorens Stadium, Mayagüez
July 20, 2010		Boxscore		Santiago Llorens Stadium, Mayagüez

July 20, 2010	Guatemala	0 – 5	Puerto Rico	Santiago Llorens Stadium, Mayagüez

July 21, 2010	Panama	0 – 1	Guatemala	Santiago Llorens Stadium, Mayagüez

July 21, 2010	Mexico	2 – 3	Venezuela	Santiago Llorens Stadium, Mayagüez

July 21, 2010	Dominican Republic	5 – 2	Puerto Rico	Santiago Llorens Stadium, Mayagüez

July 22, 2010	Panama	0 – 4	Dominican Republic	Santiago Llorens Stadium, Mayagüez

July 22, 2010	Guatemala	1 – 2	Mexico	Santiago Llorens Stadium, Mayagüez

July 23, 2010	Venezuela	1 – 2	Puerto Rico	Santiago Llorens Stadium, Mayagüez
July 23, 2010		Boxscore		Santiago Llorens Stadium, Mayagüez

=== Medal round ===
Semi-finals
July 24 – Santiago Llorens Stadium
Dominican Republic	2
Venezuela	3
July 24 – Santiago Llorens Stadium
Puerto Rico	3
Mexico	4

Grand Final
July 25 – Santiago Llorens Stadium
Venezuela	2
Dominican Republic	1
Final
July 25 – Santiago Llorens Stadium
Dominican Republic	5
Mexico	3

July 24, 2010	Puerto Rico	3 – 4	Mexico	Santiago Llorens Stadium, Mayagüez
July 24, 2010		Boxscore		Santiago Llorens Stadium, Mayagüez

July 24, 2010	Venezuela	3 – 2	Dominican Republic	Santiago Llorens Stadium, Mayagüez

July 25, 2010	Dominican Republic	5 – 3	Mexico	Santiago Llorens Stadium, Mayagüez
July 25, 2010		Boxscore		Santiago Llorens Stadium, Mayagüez

July 25, 2010	Venezuela	2 – 1	Dominican Republic	Santiago Llorens Stadium, Mayagüez
July 25, 2010		Boxscore		Santiago Llorens Stadium, Mayagüez

== Women ==
=== Preliminary round ===
Teams	W	L	Pct.	GB	R	RA
Venezuela	6	0	1.000	—	41	1
Dominican Republic	5	1	0.833	1	23	12
Puerto Rico	4	2	0.667	2	30	4
Guatemala	3	3	.500	3	11	25
Mexico	1	5	.167	5	4	25
Netherlands Antilles	1	5	.167	5	23	39
El Salvador	1	5	.167	5	10	36

July 23, 2010	Mexico	0 – 7	Venezuela	Julio Rivera Lopez Stadium, Hormigueros

July 23, 2010	Guatemala	0 – 5	Dominican Republic	Julio Rivera Lopez Stadium, Hormigueros

July 23, 2010	El Salvador	0 – 8	Puerto Rico	Julio Rivera Lopez Stadium, Hormigueros

July 24, 2010	El Salvador	0 – 7	Venezuela	Julio Rivera Lopez Stadium, Hormigueros

July 24, 2010	Dominican Republic	2 – 1	Mexico	Julio Rivera Lopez Stadium, Hormigueros
July 24, 2010		Boxscore		Julio Rivera Lopez Stadium, Hormigueros

July 24, 2010	Puerto Rico	2 – 0	Netherlands Antilles	Julio Rivera Lopez Stadium, Hormigueros
July 24, 2010		Boxscore		Julio Rivera Lopez Stadium, Hormigueros

July 25, 2010	El Salvador	3 – 7	Dominican Republic	Julio Rivera Lopez Stadium, Hormigueros
July 25, 2010		Boxscore		Julio Rivera Lopez Stadium, Hormigueros

July 25, 2010	Netherlands Antilles	1 – 12	Venezuela	Julio Rivera Lopez Stadium, Hormigueros
July 25, 2010		Boxscore		Julio Rivera Lopez Stadium, Hormigueros

July 25, 2010	Guatemala	0 – 7	Puerto Rico	Julio Rivera Lopez Stadium, Hormigueros

July 26, 2010	Dominican Republic	7 – 0	Netherlands Antilles	Julio Rivera Lopez Stadium, Hormigueros

July 26, 2010	Venezuela	6 – 0	Guatemala	Julio Rivera Lopez Stadium, Hormigueros
July 26, 2010		Boxscore		Julio Rivera Lopez Stadium, Hormigueros

July 26, 2010	Puerto Rico	12 – 0	Mexico	Julio Rivera Lopez Stadium, Hormigueros

July 27, 2010	El Salvador	1 – 0	Guatemala	Julio Rivera Lopez Stadium, Hormigueros
July 27, 2010		Boxscore		Julio Rivera Lopez Stadium, Hormigueros

July 27, 2010	Netherlands Antilles	2 – 3	Mexico	Julio Rivera Lopez Stadium, Hormigueros

July 27, 2010	Dominican Republic	2 – 1	Puerto Rico	Julio Rivera Lopez Stadium, Hormigueros
July 27, 2010		Boxscore		Julio Rivera Lopez Stadium, Hormigueros

July 28, 2010	Guatemala	9 – 7	Netherlands Antilles	Julio Rivera Lopez Stadium, Hormigueros
July 28, 2010		Boxscore		Julio Rivera Lopez Stadium, Hormigueros

July 28, 2010	Mexico	0 – 1	El Salvador	Julio Rivera Lopez Stadium, Hormigueros
July 28, 2010		Boxscore		Julio Rivera Lopez Stadium, Hormigueros

July 28, 2010	Puerto Rico	0 – 2	Venezuela	Julio Rivera Lopez Stadium, Hormigueros

July 29, 2010	Venezuela	7 – 0	Dominican Republic	Julio Rivera Lopez Stadium, Hormigueros
July 29, 2010		Boxscore		Julio Rivera Lopez Stadium, Hormigueros

July 29, 2010	Mexico	0 – 1	Guatemala	Julio Rivera Lopez Stadium, Hormigueros
July 29, 2010		Boxscore		Julio Rivera Lopez Stadium, Hormigueros

July 29, 2010	Netherlands Antilles	13 – 6	El Salvador	Julio Rivera Lopez Stadium, Hormigueros
July 29, 2010		Boxscore		Julio Rivera Lopez Stadium, Hormigueros

=== Medal round ===
Semi-finals
July 29 – Julio Rivera Lopez Stadium
Puerto Rico	0
Guatemala	1
July 29 – Julio Rivera Lopez Stadium
Dominican Republic	2
Venezuela	9

Grand Final
July 30 – Julio Rivera Lopez Stadium
Venezuela	2
Dominican Republic	0
Final
July 30 – Julio Rivera Lopez Stadium
Guatemala	1
Dominican Republic	4

July 29, 2010	Puerto Rico	0 – 1	Guatemala	Julio Rivera Lopez Stadium, Hormigueros

July 29, 2010	Dominican Republic	2 – 9	Venezuela	Julio Rivera Lopez Stadium, Hormigueros
July 29, 2010		Boxscore		Julio Rivera Lopez Stadium, Hormigueros

July 30, 2010	Guatemala	1 – 4	Dominican Republic	Julio Rivera Lopez Stadium, Hormigueros
July 30, 2010		Boxscore		Julio Rivera Lopez Stadium, Hormigueros

July 30, 2010	Venezuela	2 – 0	Dominican Republic	Julio Rivera Lopez Stadium, Hormigueros
July 30, 2010		Boxscore		Julio Rivera Lopez Stadium, Hormigueros
