= Olmecas de Tabasco (softball) =

Mexican professional women's softball team

- Logo

Information
- League: Mexican Softball League
- Location: Villahermosa, Tabasco, Mexico
- Ballpark: Estadio Centenario 27 de Febrero
- Founded: 20 September 2023; 2 years ago
- Colors: Turquoise, cerise and white
- Manager: Oscar Tinoco

Current uniforms
Home	Away

The Olmecas de Tabasco are a Mexican professional women's softball team based in Villahermosa, Tabasco. The Olmecas compete in the Mexican Softball League (LMS).

== History ==
The Mexican Softball League (LMS) was established on 20 September 2023 as the first professional softball league in Latin America. The Olmecas de Tabasco were one of the founding members of the league, alongside Bravos de León, Charros de Jalisco, Diablos Rojos del México, El Águila de Veracruz, and Sultanes de Monterrey; all of the teams were affiliated to baseball clubs from the Mexican League.

The Olmecas debuted with a 0–3 loss to the Diablos Rojos del México on 25 January 2024, on the opening day of the inaugural season of the Mexican Softball League. The game, played in the Estadio Centenario 27 de Febrero had an attendance of 12,000 spectators. The team, led by manager Luisa Hernández, finished fifth with a 11–13 record, failing to qualify for the playoffs.

On 11 December 2024, Venezuelan Olympian Zuleyma Cirimele was appointed manager of the team ahead of the 2025 season. Before the final game of the season, Cirimele left the team and was replaced by Martín Botello. The team was once again eliminated from the postseason after finishing fifth with a 12–16 record.

On 13 November 2025, Oscar Soto, who had previously worked with the team as a coach in 2024, was appointed manager. Botello was reassigned as bench coach.

== Roster ==
As of January 2026

Position	No.	Name	Age	Height	Bats	Throws
Players
Pitchers	10	(Mexico) Dominique Alcocer	age 31	1.64 m (5 ft 4 1/2 in)	Right	Right
Pitchers	17	(Mexico) Diana Castillo	age 34	1.64 m (5 ft 4 1/2 in)	Right	Right
Pitchers	20	(Mexico) Karen Ávalos	age 33	1.57 m (5 ft 2 in)	Right	Right
Pitchers	--	(Canada) Dawn Bodrug	age 26	1.80 m (5 ft 11 in)	Right	Right
Pitchers	--	(United States) Donnie Gobourne		1.73 m (5 ft 8 in)	Right	Right
Pitchers	--	(Australia) Jayme Reddacliff	age 30	1.80 m (5 ft 11 in)	Right	Right
Catchers	18	(Mexico) Jacqueline Castorena	age 23	1.60 m (5 ft 3 in)	Right	Right
Catchers	19	(Mexico) Marcela Díaz	age 24	1.75 m (5 ft 9 in)	Right	Right
Infielders	24	(Mexico) Luisa Hernández	age 34	1.75 m (5 ft 9 in)	Left	Left
Infielders	56	(Mexico) Priscila Sánchez	age 24	1.69 m (5 ft 6 1/2 in)	Right	Right
Infielders	58	(Mexico) Samaria Benítez	age 23	1.60 m (5 ft 3 in)	Right	Right
Infielders	--	(Japan) Wakako Chikamoto	age 27	1.61 m (5 ft 3 1/2 in)	Right	Right
Infielders	--	(Mexico) Camille Escobar			Right	Right
Infielders	--	(United States) Chloe Malau'ulu	age 25	1.70 m (5 ft 7 in)	Right	Right
Infielders	--	(Australia) Shaylan Whatman	age 25	1.70 m (5 ft 7 in)	Right	Right
Outfielders	12	(Mexico) Narda Andrade	age 31	1.62 m (5 ft 4 in)	Right	Right
Outfielders	13	(United States) Destini Brown	age 26	1.80 m (5 ft 11 in)	Right	Right
Outfielders	--	(Mexico) Itzel Araujo			Right	Right
Outfielders	--	(United States) McKenzie Clark	age 24		Right	Right
Outfielders	--	(Mexico) Pamela Rosas	age 23		Right	Right

== Season-by-season ==
Season	League	Finish	Wins	Loses	Win%	GB	Postseason	Manager
2024	LMS	5th	11	13	.458	4.0	Did not qualify	(Mexico) Luisa Hernández
2025	LMS	5th	12	16	.429	11.0	Did not qualify	(Venezuela) Zuleyma Cirimele
