= Héctor Hurtado (baseball) =

Mexican baseball player and manager (born 1971)

Diablos Rojos del México
- Catcher / Manager
- Born: 16 May 1971 (age 55); Navojoa, Sonora, Mexico
- Bats: Right Throws: Right

Héctor Hugo Hurtado Agadandar (born 16 May 1971) is a Mexican professional baseball and softball manager and former outfielder who currently serves as the manager for the Diablos Rojos del México of the Mexican Softball League. Hurtado spent his entire professional career in Mexico, where he played 26 seasons in the Mexican League, and 17 seasons in the Mexican Pacific League.

== Playing career ==
=== Mexican League ===
Hurtado spent 22 seasons in the Mexican League, playing for 12 teams. He began his career with the Bravos de León from 1989 to 1991, winning the league championship in 1990, and subsequently played for the Petroleros de Minatitlán in 1992 and 1997, the Tigres de México in 1994, and the Sultanes de Monterrey from 1995 to 1996, winning another championship with Monterrey in 1995. He later played for the Piratas de Campeche in 1996 and 1999, the Algodoneros de Unión Laguna in 1998, the Langosteros de Cancún in 1999, the Acereros de Monclova in 2000 and from 2006 to 2007, Monterrey in 2001, the Tecolotes de los Dos Laredos from 2002 to 2003, the Toros de Tijuana in 2004, the Pericos de Puebla in 2005, the Tecolotes de Nuevo Laredo and Dorados de Chihuahua in 2008, the Vaqueros Laguna and Dorados de Chihuahua in 2009 and 2010, and the Tigres de Quintana Roo in 2011, winning his third Mexican League championship.

=== Mexican Pacific League ===
Hurtado played 17 seasons in the Mexican Pacific League. He debuted in the league in 1989 and played for the Algodoneros de Guasave from 1989 to 1996, the Cañeros de Los Mochis in the 1997–98 season, and the Naranjeros de Hermosillo from 1998 to 2000. He returned to Los Mochis from 2000 to 2005, winning the league championship in the 2002–03 season, before rejoining Hermosillo from 2005 to 2007, where he won another championship in the 2006–07 season. He concluded his playing career in the league with the Águilas de Mexicali in the 2011–12 season.

Mexican Pacific League career statistics
Seasons	G	AB	R	H	2B	3B	HR	RBI	SB	BB	BA	SLG
17	307	693	40	137	21	2	8	57	0	40	.198	.313

== Managerial career ==
=== Broncos de Reynosa ===
On 20 May 2016, Hurtado was announced as the new manager for the Broncos de Reynosa of the Mexican League, replacing Rafael Castañeda, who led the Broncos to a 12–29 start that left them last in the North Zone and tied with the Guerreros de Oaxaca for the worst record in the league. Hurtado was unable to improve the team's performance, compiling a 12–59 record as the Broncos finished last in the North Zone with a 24–88 record overall in of the team's worst seasons.

=== Tigres de Quintana Roo ===
On 19 July 2017, Hurtado, who had been serving as the third-base coach for the Tigres de Quintana Roo, replaced Roberto Vizcarra as manager of the team, making his debut with a 2–1 win over the Vaqueros Laguna at Estadio Beto Ávila. Hurtado compiled a 12–7 record as the Tigres finished third in the South Zone and were swept in four games by the Pericos de Puebla in the first round of the playoffs.

In 2018, Tigres hired Tim Johnson as manager, while Hurtado was assigned as bench coach. In the second tournament of 2018, Hurtado replaced Johnson as manager on 23 July, after the latter led the Tigres to a 4–13 start. After compiling a 9–11 record, Hurtado was replaced by interim manager Raúl Sánchez, who led the Tigres for the remainder of the tournament.

=== Pericos de Puebla ===
In January 2023, Hurtado was appointed as manager for the Pericos de Puebla of the Mexican League, replacing Willie Romero. He was dismissed on 8 September 2023, fifteen games into the season, where he led the Pericos to a 6–9 record, and was replaced by Sergio Omar Gastélum.

=== Diablos Rojos del México softball ===
In 2024, Hurtado joined the softball section of the Diablos Rojos del México of the Mexican Softball League as part of the coaching staff. On 6 October 2026, he was appointed as manager for the team ahead of the 2027 season, replacing Denisse Fuenmayor.

== Managerial statistics ==
=== Mexican League ===
Year	Team	Regular season						Postseason			
Year	Team	Games	Won	Lost	Tied	Pct.	Finish	Won	Lost	Pct.	Notes
2016	Broncos de Reynosa	71	12	59	0	.169	8th	–	–	–	–
2017	Tigres de Quintana Roo	19	12	7	0	.632	3rd	0	4	.000	Lost First round (Puebla)
2018	Tigres de Quintana Roo	20	9	11	0	.450	–	–	–	–	–
2023	Pericos de Puebla	15	6	9	0	.400	–	–	–	–	–
Total		125	39	86	0	.312		0	4	.000	
