= Stefanía Aradillas =

Mexican softball player (born 1994)

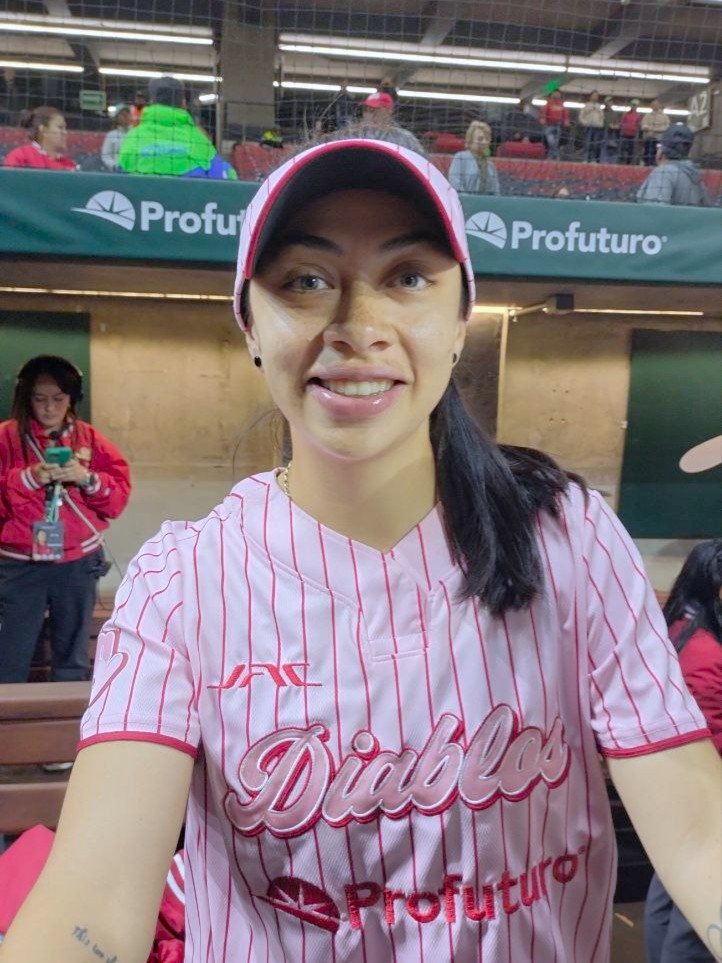
- Stefanía Aradillas in 2025

Diablos Rojos del México – No. 23
- Outfielder
- Born: September 15, 1994 (age 30); Mexico City, Mexico

Teams
- Mt. San Antonio (2013–2014); San Diego State (2015–2016); Diablos Rojos del México (2024–present)

Career highlights and awards
- Mexican Softball League champion (2025)
Medals
Women's softball
Representing Mexico
Central American and Caribbean Games
Silver medal – second place	2018 Barranquilla	Team
Bronze medal – third place	2023 San Salvador	Team

Stefanía Aradillas Alanis (born September 15, 1994) is a Mexican softball player for the Diablos Rojos del México of the Mexican Softball League and member of the Mexico women's national softball team. She represented Team Mexico at the 2020 Summer Olympics.

== Early life ==
Aradillas was born to Federico Aradillas and Carmen Alanis. She attended high school at Colegio Williams in Mexico City.

== College career ==
Aradillas began her collegiate career at Mt. San Antonio College. As a freshman in 2013, she posted a .372 batting average, with eight home runs, 39 RBIs, 42 runs and 11 stolen bases. Following the season she earned first-team all-conference honors after helping the Mounties become the undefeated conference champions. As a sophomore in 2014, she posted a .338 batting average with two home runs, 21 RBIs, 21 runs and four stolen bases. She transferred to San Diego State for her junior year. In her first season with the Aztecs in 2015, she appeared in eight games, where she posted a .111 batting average with an RBI, run, two walks and a sacrifice fly. On May 1, 2015, she made her first career start, and recorded her first career hit, RBI and run. During her senior year in 2016, she appeared in 19 games, with 12 starts, where she posted a .118 batting average, with four RBIs, four walks and two sacrifice bunts.

== Professional career ==
In January 2024, Aradillas joined the softball section of the Diablos Rojos del México.

== International career ==
Aradillas represented Team Mexico at the 2015 and 2017 World Cup of Softball. During the Olympic Qualifier, Aradillas helped Mexico qualify for the Olympics for the first time in team history with a 2–1 victory over Canada on August 31, 2019. She represented Team Mexico at the 2020 Summer Olympics, where she was the only Mexican native on the Olympic team.

She represented Mexico at the 2023 Central American and Caribbean Games and won a bronze medal.
