= El Águila de Veracruz (softball) =

Mexican professional women's softball team

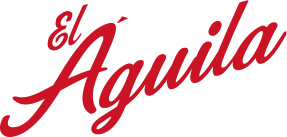

Logo	Cap insignia

Information
- League: Mexican Softball League
- Location: Veracruz, Veracruz, Mexico
- Ballpark: Estadio Universitario Beto Ávila
- Founded: 20 September 2023; 2 years ago
- Nickname: Las Gloriosas ("The Glorious Ones")
- Colors: Red, navy blue and white
- Manager: Jorge Corvera

Current uniforms
Home	Away

El Águila de Veracruz is a Mexican professional women's softball team based in Veracruz, Veracruz. El Águila competes in the Mexican Softball League (LMS).

== History ==
The Mexican Softball League (LMS) was established on 20 September 2023 as the first professional softball league in Latin America. El Águila de Veracruz was one of the founding members of the league, alongside Bravos de León, Charros de Jalisco, Diablos Rojos del México, Olmecas de Tabasco, and Sultanes de Monterrey; all of the teams were affiliated to baseball clubs from the Mexican League.

El Águila debuted with a 0–1 defeat against the Sultanes de Monterrey on 25 January 2024, on the opening day of the inaugural season of the Mexican Softball League. The game, played in the Estadio de Beisbol Monterrey had a record attendance of 13,408 spectators. The winning pitcher, Yanina Treviño, threw the first no-hitter in the history of the league, allowing only two base on balls in seven innings.

On 7 February 2024, the team's manager, Flor Imperial, was replaced by César Alcantar. The club finished fourth, qualifying to the postseason, where they were eliminated by Monterrey.

Argenis Rodrigo was appointed as manager ahead of the 2025 season; he was replaced mid-season by Curtis Di Salle. The team failed to qualify to the playoffs, finishing sixth with a 12–16 record.

The team signed 2020 Olympians Erika Piancastelli and Suzy Brookshire ahead of the 2026 season and appointed Jorge Corvera as manager.

== Roster ==
As of February 2026

Position	No.	Name	Age	Height	Bats	Throws
Players
Pitchers	2	(United States) Alexis Bermudez		1.68 m (5 ft 6 in)	Right	Right
Pitchers	4	(Netherlands) Lisa Hop	age 27	1.78 m (5 ft 10 in)	Left	Right
Pitchers	12	(Italy) Ilaria Cacciamani	age 31	1.68 m (5 ft 6 in)	Right	Right
Pitchers	27	(Mexico) Aranza Sánchez			Right	Right
Catchers	20	(Italy) Erika Piancastelli	age 29	1.75 m (5 ft 9 in)	Right	Right
Catchers	21	(Netherlands) Brenda Beers	age 29		Right	Left
Catchers	23	(Mexico) Yamileth Lozano	age 24		Right	Right
Infielders	6	(Mexico) Diana Vizcarra			Left	Left
Infielders	13	(Mexico) María José Valenzuela	age 28		Right	Right
Infielders	31	(Mexico) Laura Cortés			Right	Right
Infielders	44	(United States) Stormy Kotzelnick	age 24	1.60 m (5 ft 3 in)	Left	Right
Infielders	57	(Mexico) Daillana Frías			Right	Right
Infielders	66	(Mexico) Erika Gutiérrez			Right	Right
Outfielders	00	(United States) Suzy Brookshire	age 27	1.75 m (5 ft 9 in)	Right	Right
Outfielders	8	(Mexico) Namibia Ramírez			Right	Right
Outfielders	9	(United States) Linnah Rebolledo		1.60 m (5 ft 3 in)	Right	Right
Outfielders	15	(Mexico) Fernanda Lara			Right	Right
Outfielders	19	(Mexico) Marlen Lagunes	age 25		Right	Right
Outfielders	24	(Mexico) Azalia Hernández			Right	Right

== Season-by-season ==
Season	League	Finish	Wins	Loses	Win%	GB	Postseason	Manager
2024	LMS	4th	12	12	.500	3.0	Lost Semi-finals (Monterrey)	(Mexico) Flor Imperial (Mexico) César Alcantar
2025	LMS	6th	12	16	.429	11.0	Did not qualify	(Venezuela) Argenis Rodrigo (Venezuela) Curtis Di Salle
