= Faraimo =

Faraimo is a surname. Notable people with the surname include:

- Bureta Faraimo (born 1990), American rugby league footballer
- Megan Faraimo (born 2000), American softball player
