= Suzy Brookshire =

American softball player

El Águila de Veracruz – No. 00
- Outfielder
- Born: March 17, 1998 (age 27); Gilroy, California, U.S.
- Bats: Right Throws: Right

Teams
- Sacramento State (2019); San Jose State (2020); Long Beach State (2021); Smash It Sports Vipers (2023); El Águila de Veracruz (2026–present)

Suzannah Lillian Brookshire-González (born March 17, 1998) is an American professional softball player for the El Águila de Veracruz of the Mexican Softball League. She played for college softball for three universities from 2017 to 2021, the San Jose State Spartans, Sacramento State Hornets and the Long Beach State 49ers. Brookeshire was a power hitter joining an elite NCAA Division I club with her career 62 home runs and 201 RBIs. She represented Team Mexico at the 2020 Summer Olympics where they placed fourth in their first appearance.

== Early life ==
Brookshire was born in Gilroy, California to Alan Brookshire and Stacey Vanderlei; her grandmother Helen Gonzales was born in Mexico. Growing up in Hollister, California, attended San Benito High School. As a junior in 2015, she hit .560, with nine home runs, six triples, 17 doubles and 55 RBIs, and led the league in all categories to win the Triple Crown. She struck out only seven times in 99 plate appearances, with a .586 on-base percentage, 1.1175 slugging percentage and 1.762 OPS. As a senior in 2016, she hit .451 with 13 home runs and 42 RBIs in 28 games. During her career, her team had a 98–15–1 overall record and won three CIF Central Coast Section championships, and four league titles. She was also named co-Monterey Bay League MVP, a two-time Cal-Hi Sports all-state selection, and two time Cal-Hi Sports All-State Softball First Team honoree.

== College career ==
Brookshire began her collegiate career at Sacramento State. During her freshman year in 2017, she led or tied for the team lead in batting average (.358), runs scored (43), hits (54), doubles (8), home runs (15), total bases (109), slugging percentage (.722), on-base percentage (.443) and OPS (1.165). Following the season she was named first team All-Big Sky, third team all-Pacific Region, and Sacramento State's Female Newcomer of the Year. She became the fourth Sacramento State freshman in program history to receive all-region honors.

During her sophomore year in 2018, she posted a .371 batting average, with 13 doubles, 18 homers, 51 RBIs, 27 walks, 125 total bases, .828 slugging percentage, .461 on-base percentage and a 1.289 OPS. She set the program single-season record for home runs with 18, surpassing the previous record of 15, she set as a freshman. She ranked among the top three players in the conference in average, runs, home runs, doubles, RBIs, slugging percentage, on-base percentage and total bases. Following an outstanding season, she was named second team all-Pacific Region, a unanimous first team All-Big Sky selection, Big Sky Conference Player of the Year and Big Sky Tournament MVP. She became the first position player in Sacramento State history to be named all-region in consecutive seasons.

During her junior year in 2019, she posted a .303 batting average with 12 doubles and 11 home runs, and led the team with 38 RBI. Following the season she was voted Sacramento State's Best Female Athlete. She finished her career at Sacramento State as the career leader in home runs (39), and slugging percentage (.706), ranked second in RBIs (112), fourth in total bases (291), fifth in on-base percentage (.417), runs scored (107) and sixth in batting average (.340). For her senior year in 2020, she transferred to San Jose State. She started all 26 games for the Spartans, and posted a .356 batting average, with 26 hits, 23 runs scored, and led the team with 22 RBI, a .808 slugging percentage, and .442 on-base percentage, in a season that was cancelled due to the COVID-19 pandemic.

On October 30, 2020, Brookshire announced she would transfer to Long Beach State. During her redshirt senior year in 2021, she posted a .400 batting average, with 48 hits, five doubles, four triples, 10 home runs, and 49 RBI. She led Long Beach State in home runs 49 RBI, and ranked in the Top 10 nationally in RBI per game. She became the third player in Long Beach State program history to hit .400 during a season. She helped Long Beach State win their first Big West championship since 2014, and advance to the 2021 NCAA Division I softball tournament. Following the season she was named first team All-Big West and third team All-West Region.

== Professional career ==
Brookshire began her professional career with the Smash It Sports Vipers of the Women's Professional Fastpitch league in 2022.

On December 2, 2025, Brookshire signed with El Águila de Veracruz of the Mexican Softball League.

== International career ==
Brookshire has been a member of Mexico women's national softball team since 2017. During an Olympic Qualifier game on August 31, 2019, against Canada, Brookshire helped Mexico qualify for the Olympics for the first time in team history when she drew a bases-loaded walk to tie the game, in a game Mexico eventually won by a score of 2–1. She was selected to represent Mexico at the 2020 Summer Olympics, where she recorded the first hit in Mexican Olympic history in their opening game against Canada. Brookshire and Team Mexico were defeated by Canada in the bronze medal game on July 27, 2021, she had one hit in the game. For the tournament, Brookshire recorded four hits, a double, triple, two RBI and three walks.
