= Charros de Jalisco (softball) =

Logo	Cap insignia

Information
- League: Mexican Softball League
- Location: Zapopan, Jalisco, Mexico
- Ballpark: Estadio Panamericano
- Founded: 20 September 2023; 2 years ago
- Folded: 15 June 2026; 0 days ago
- Serie de la Reina championships: 1 (2024)
- Colors: Blue, light blue and white
- Manager: Yuruby Alicart

Current uniforms
Home	Away

The Charros de Jalisco were a Mexican professional women's softball team based in Zapopan, Jalisco. The Charros competed in the Mexican Softball League (LMS) and folded on 15 June 2026.

== History ==
The Mexican Softball League (LMS) was established on 20 September 2023 as the first professional softball league in Latin America. The Charros de Jalisco were one of the founding members of the league, alongside Bravos de León, Diablos Rojos del México, El Águila de Veracruz, Olmecas de Tabasco and Sultanes de Monterrey; all of the teams were affiliated to baseball clubs from the Mexican League.

The Charros debuted with a 2–1 win against Bravos de León on 25 January 2024, on the opening day of the inaugural season of the Mexican Softball League. The team played its home games during the 2024 season in the Estadio Panamericano in Zapopan, in the Guadalajara metropolitan area. Infielder and Olympian for Venezuela at the 2008 Summer Olympics Yuruby Alicart was selected as the team's captain.

The team finished the 2024 regular season in second place with a 14–9 record. In the postseason, the Charros swept the Diablos Rojos 3–0 in the semifinals. In the final series, the Serie de la Reina (Queen's Series), the Charros faced Sultanes de Monterrey, defeating the Sultanes 3 games to 1. Charros' pitcher Yeraldine Carrión was awarded as the most valuable player of the championship series. Carrión also lead the league in earned run average, posting a 1.44 ERA, and saves, with two. Yuruby Alicart finished the season as the league leader in runs batted in with 21; whereas catcher Karime Valles was the league leader in home runs with six.

On 15 June 2026, the club announced that they would no longer participate in the Mexican Softball League.

== Roster ==
As of January 2026

Position	No.	Name	Age	Height	Bats	Throws
Players
Pitchers	4	(Mexico) Yeraldine Carrión	age 24	1.69 m (5 ft 6 1/2 in)	Right	Right
Pitchers	17	(Mexico) Olivia de la Torre	age 26	1.71 m (5 ft 7 1/2 in)	Right	Right
Pitchers	19	(Netherlands) Eva Voortman	age 33	1.74 m (5 ft 8 1/2 in)	Right	Left
Pitchers	24	(Mexico) Dayra Sandoval	age 24	1.70 m (5 ft 7 in)	Right	Right
Pitchers	--	(United States) Rissa Bajusz		1.78 m (5 ft 10 in)	Right	Right
Pitchers	--	(Mexico) Ángela Cota			Right	Right
Catchers	12	(Mexico) Karime Valles	age 26	1.63 m (5 ft 4 in)	Right	Right
Catchers	33	(Mexico) Valeria Hernández	age 19	1.68 m (5 ft 6 in)	Right	Right
Catchers	--	(Canada) Natalie Wideman	age 34	1.60 m (5 ft 3 in)	Right	Right
Infielders	2	(Venezuela) Geraldine Puertas	age 38	1.68 m (5 ft 6 in)	Right	Right
Infielders	6	(Mexico) Abigail Botello	age 27	1.51 m (4 ft 11 1/2 in)	Right	Right
Infielders	21	(Mexico) Sophia Ceballos	age 26	1.72 m (5 ft 7 1/2 in)	Left	Right
Infielders	77	(United States) Valeria Quiroga	age 25	1.60 m (5 ft 3 in)	Right	Right
Infielders	--	(Canada) Janet Leung	age 32	1.69 m (5 ft 6 1/2 in)	Right	Right
Outfielders	7	(Japan) Mikiko Eguchi	age 35	1.61 m (5 ft 3 1/2 in)	Left	Right
Outfielders	11	(Mexico) Nadia Hernández	age 26	1.64 m (5 ft 4 1/2 in)	Right	Right
Outfielders	88	(Mexico) Silvia Ochoa	age 25	1.63 m (5 ft 4 in)	Left	Right
Outfielders	--	(United States) Cori McMillan		1.75 m (5 ft 9 in)	Left	Right
Coaches
Manager	1	(Venezuela) Yuruby Alicart	age 40	–	–	–

== Season-by-season ==
Season	League	Finish	Wins	Loses	Win%	GB	Post-season	Manager
2024	LMS	2nd	14	9	.609	1.0	Won Serie de la Reina (Monterrey) 3–1	(Mexico) Jorge Corvera
2025	LMS	4th	13	15	.464	10.0	Lost semifinals (México) 1–3	(Mexico) Jorge Corvera
