= Eva Voortman =

Dutch softball player

Charros de Jalisco – No. 19
- Pitcher
- Born: 29 November 1992 (age 33); Utrecht, Netherlands
- Bats: Left Throws: Left

Teams
- Charros de Jalisco (2025–present)
Medals
Women's softball
Representing Netherlands
European Championship
Gold medal – first place	2022 Sant Boi de Llobregat	Team

Eva Maria Petronella Voortman (born 29 November 1992) is a Dutch professional softball player for the Charros de Jalisco of the Mexican Softball League.

== Career ==
At the end of 2021 she moved from Quick Amersfoort to Neptunus. She is member of the Netherlands women's national softball team, with an interception since January 2011. With the national team she became European champion at the 2022 Women's Softball European Championship.

Voortman studied High Performance Coaching at the VU University Amsterdam.

In November 2024, Voortman signed with the Charros de Jalisco of the Mexican Softball League.
