= Domingo Santana (second baseman) =

Mexican baseball player

- Second baseman / Manager
- Born: 20 December 1910; Mineral de Pozos, Guanajuato, Mexico
- Died: 9 December 1999 (aged 88); León, Guanajuato, Mexico

Domingo Santana Pulido (20 December 1910 – 9 December 1999) was a Mexican professional baseball second baseman and manager. He played six seasons in the Mexican League between 1937 and 1951, and after retiring, he managed several teams in the Mexican Central League. Santana also represented Mexico at the Central American and Caribbean Games and Pan American Games.

He was nicknamed "El cerebro mágico" (The Magical Brain) after an episode in which the Mexican team managed to defeat Cuba in Havana thanks to Santana’s ability to decipher the opposing team's signals.

== Playing career ==
Santana was born on 20 December 1920 in Mineral de Pozos, a mining town in Guanajuato, Mexico. He started playing baseball aged 14 and made his professional debut in the Mexican League in 1937 with Agrario de México. In 1939 he played for the Indios de Anáhuac. In 1942 and 1944 he played for the Diablos Rojos del México, although he finished the 1944 season playing for El Águila de Veracruz. In 1946, he played for the Tuneros de San Luis Potosí and in 1951 he played his final professional season with the Charros de Jalisco.

Santana represented Mexico at the 1938 Central American and Caribbean Games in Panama City, where he appeared in three games against Nicaragua, Cuba and Puerto Rico; he recorded only one hit in eight at bats for a .125 batting average.

== Managerial career ==
Santana began his managerial career in 1952, one year after his retirement as player, managing the Dorados de Chihuahua in the Arizona–Texas League. He then managed in the Mexican Central League, leading the Tuneros de San Luis Potosí from 1960 to 1962, the Tuzos de Guanajuato from 1963 to 1967 and the Broncos de Ciudad Mante in 1969.

Santana also managed the baseball team of the Technological Institute of León in León, Guanajuato.

== Legacy ==
The professional baseball stadium in the city of León, Guanajuato is named after Santana: Estadio Domingo Santana. Opened in 1973, the stadium has hosted the Bravos de León of the Mexican League in several stints since the 1990s.

Santana died on 9 December 1999 in León, Guanajuato.
