= Johana Gómez =

Johana Gómez can refer to:

- Johana Gómez (softball), Venezuelan softball player
- Johana Gómez (boxer), Venezuelan boxer
