= Diablos Rojos del México (softball) =

Mexican professional women's softball team

Logo	Cap insignia

Information
- League: Mexican Softball League
- Location: Iztacalco, Mexico City, Mexico
- Ballpark: Estadio Alfredo Harp Helú
- Founded: 20 September 2023; 3 years ago
- Serie de la Reina championships: 1 (2025)
- Colors: Red, mint and white
- Ownership: Fundación Alfredo Harp Helú
- General manager: Iván Terrazas
- Manager: Héctor Hurtado

Current uniforms
Home	Away

The Diablos Rojos del México are a Mexican professional women's softball team based in Mexico City. The Diablos Rojos compete in the Mexican Softball League (LMS).

== History ==
The Mexican Softball League (LMS) was established on 20 September 2023 as the first professional softball league in Latin America. The Diablos Rojos del México were one of the founding members of the league, alongside Bravos de León, Charros de Jalisco, El Águila de Veracruz, Olmecas de Tabasco, and Sultanes de Monterrey; all of the teams were affiliated to baseball clubs from the Mexican League.

The Diablos Rojos debuted with a 3–0 win against Olmecas de Tabasco on 25 January 2024, on the opening day of the inaugural season of the Mexican Softball League. The team played its home games during the 2024 season in the UNAM's baseball field due to renovations in the Estadio Alfredo Harp Helú. The team finished the regular season in third place with a 14–10 record. Leannelys Zayas led the league in batting average (.479), runs (29), and hits (35). In the postseason, the Diablos faced Charros de Jalisco in the semifinals, losing all three games.

For the 2025 season, the club signed several international players: pitcher Megan Faraimo from United States and pitcher Ilaria Cacciamani and catcher Elisa Cecchetti, who both competed for Italy in the 2020 Summer Olympics. On 26 January 2025, Faraimo threw the first perfect game in the history of the LMS in the Diablos Rojos' 6–0 victory against El Águila de Veracruz.

On 2 October 2026, Denisse Fuenmayor left the team after three seasons. On 6 October 2026, Héctor Hurtado was appointed as the new manager.

== Roster ==
As of January 2025

Position	No.	Name	Age	Height	Bats	Throws
Players
Pitchers	20	(Mexico) Karla Téllez			Right	Right
Pitchers	--	(United States) Carley Hoover	age 31	1.88 m (6 ft 2 in)	Right	Right
Pitchers	--	(Cuba) Yilián Tornés	age 34		Left	Left
Catchers	15	(Italy) Elisa Cecchetti	age 31	1.78 m (5 ft 10 in)	Right	Right
Catchers	--	(Cuba) Rosangela Jardines	age 29	1.72 m (5 ft 7 1/2 in)	Left	Right
Infielders	4	(Cuba) Leannelys Zayas	age 25		Right	Right
Infielders	14	(Mexico) Yamilet Sandoval	age 25	1.59 m (5 ft 2 1/2 in)	Right	Right
Infielders	17	(Mexico) Marilyn Salas			Right	Right
Infielders	22	(Mexico) Edith de Leija	age 24	1.67 m (5 ft 5 1/2 in)	Left	Right
Infielders	24	(United States) Jazmyn Jackson		1.70 m (5 ft 7 in)	Right	Right
Infielders	29	(Mexico) Danna Barrera			Right	Right
Infielders	--	(Mexico) Rosi del Castillo	age 29	1.67 m (5 ft 5 1/2 in)	Right	Left
Outfielders	5	(Mexico) Ximena Guerrero	age 24	1.67 m (5 ft 5 1/2 in)	Right	Right
Outfielders	11	(Cuba) Elizabeth Robert	age 27	1.55 m (5 ft 1 in)	Right	Right
Outfielders	--	(United States) Janae Jefferson	age 27	1.63 m (5 ft 4 in)	Right	Right
Coaches
Manager	--	(Mexico) Héctor Hurtado	age 55	–	–	–
Coaches	42	(Puerto Rico) Edwin Mercado		–	–	–

== Season-by-season ==
Season	League	Finish	Wins	Loses	Win%	GB	Postseason	Manager
2024	LMS	3rd	14	10	.583	1.0	Lost Semifinals (Jalisco) 0–3	(Venezuela) Denisse Fuenmayor
2025	LMS	1st	23	5	.821	–	Won Serie de la Reina (Monterrey) 3–0	(Venezuela) Denisse Fuenmayor
