= Softball at the 2023 Central American and Caribbean Games =

- Venue: Estadio de Sóftbol Pablo Arnoldo Guzmán
- Location: San Salvador
- Dates: 25 – 28 June
- Teams: 8 (men); 8 (women)

Softball at the 2023 Central American and Caribbean Games will be held from the 25 to 28 June. Both tournaments will be held at the Estadio de Sóftbol Pablo Arnoldo Guzmán in San Salvador, El Salvador.

== Medal table ==
* Host nation (El Salvador)

Rank	Nation	Gold	Silver	Bronze	Total
1	Dominican Republic (DOM)	1	0	0	1
1	Puerto Rico (PUR)	1	0	0	1
3	Mexico (MEX)	0	1	1	2
4	Cuba (CUB)	0	1	0	1
5	Venezuela (VEN)	0	0	1	1
Totals (5 entries)		2	2	2	6

== Medal summary ==
Event	Gold	Silver	Bronze
Men	Dominican Republic (DOM); Juan Arías; Wilton Robles; Fernando Gómez; Jonni Suriel; Yennier Pérez; Jendry Torres; Elias Valerio; Néstor Francisco; Juan Ramòrez; Yan González; Francis Medina; Yoel de Mota; Luiyi Rosario; Pablo Figuereo; Josuel Chalas	Mexico (MEX); Jordan Solorio; Jorge Martínez; Jesús Cardona; Julio Moreno; Junior Flores; Carlos Menchaca; Jesús Váldez; Samuel Villalvazo; Ernesto Sánchez; Jesús Cardona; Rubén Delgadillo; Alan Osuna; Marco González; Jorge Váldez; Edgar López	Venezuela (VEN); Luis Osorio; Jesús Quintero; Frank Ugas; Braitne Martínez; Erick Urbaneja; Eudomar Toyo; Rafael Flores; Edinson Marrero; Ángel Adames; Engelbert Herrera; Jorge Lima; Erwin Díaz; Víctor Guedez; Carlos Villegas; Michell Chirinos
Women	Puerto Rico (PUR); Janelle Martinez; Carsyn Gordon; Aleshia Ocasio; Karla Claudio; Kathyria Garcia; Valeria Rosario; Makayla Navarro; Keira Bucher; Gianna Mancha; Tatianna Roman; Camille Ortiz; Alyssa Rivera; Jena Cozza; Odalys Cordova; Aleimalee Lopez; Taran Alvelo	Cuba (CUB); Anisley Lopez; Yamerki Guevara; Ana Gonzalez; Dailyn Friol; Lisaidy Samon; Martha Torres; Rosangela Jardines; Elizabeth Robert; Leannelys Zayas; Maidelis Reyes; Yiliet Medina; Yilian Rondon; Yanisleidy Casanova; Yarianna Lopez; Yilian Tornes	Mexico (MEX); Alexia Lopez; Alyssa Rebolledo; Jillian Celis; Marlene Espinoza; Kiana Estrada; Mariangel Barbosa; Madelyn Ruffin; Stefania Aradillas; Lindsay Lopez; Yanina Trevino; Linnah Rebolledo; Raci Miranda; Kimberli Rodas; Alejandra Casas; Savannah Wysocki
