= Eduardo Arredondo =

Mexican baseball player (born 1984)

- Outfielder / Manager
- Born: October 15, 1984 (age 42); Salmoral, Veracruz, Mexico
- Bats: Left Throws: Left
- Stats at Baseball Reference

Eduardo de Jesús Arredondo Miguel (born October 15, 1984) is a Mexican former professional baseball outfielder. He was known for not striking out often (only 88 times in 352 games from 2005–2009). Arredondo was one of the best players for the Mexico national baseball team in the 2013 World Baseball Classic.

== Playing career ==
Arredondo debuted in the Mexican League in 2001 with the Rojos del Águila de Veracruz, hitting .097 at age 16. In 2002, he batted .182 and drove in five runs for Veracruz. He moved to the Olmecas de Tabasco in 2003 and improved his average to .282. In 2004 with Tabasco, Arredondo hit .236. He split 2005 between Tabasco (.248/.327/.357) and the Diablos Rojos del México (.163/.288/.306). He only appeared in 14 games for the club in 2006, hitting .296.

By 2007, Arredondo was starting for Mexico City, producing at a .303/.347/.381 rate. In 2008, the young outfielder hit .349/.397/.426 and placing 10th in the Mexican League in average, helping his club win the title. That earned him a spot on Mexico's roster for the 2008 Americas Baseball Cup. In the event, he batted .346/.370/.423 to lead Mexico in average; he scored 8 runs in 7 games and had two outfield assists to help Mexico win a spot in the 2009 Baseball World Cup. For the tournament, Arredondo tied Andy González and Ardley Jansen for third in runs, one behind Jose Hernández and Gabriel Martinez.

Arredondo continued to progress in 2009, when he hit .354/.401/.508 with 13 triples and 97 runs. He tied Pedro Valdés for 10th in the Liga in average, led in three-baggers and also led in runs (one ahead of Rubén Rivera). He was put on Mexico's squad for the 2009 Baseball World Cup. In 2010 for Mexico, Arredondo slashed .356/.411/.464 with 2 home runs and 29 RBI.

On March 12, 2011, Arredondo signed with the Broncos de Reynosa, and slashed .346/.397/.430 in 80 games for the club. He began the 2012 season with Reynosa, batting .332/.407/.402 in 57 games. On June 8, 2012, he was loaned to the Olmecas de Tabasco, with whom he hit .331 in 34 games. Arredondo did not play in a game in 2013. On April 1, 2014, Arredondo signed with the Toros de Tijuana. In 113 games, he batted .300/.367/.377 with 2 home runs and 40 RBI. In 2015, Arredondo slashed .320/.375/.422 with 3 home runs and 31 RBI. He played in 50 games for the team in 2016, with a batting line of .243/.302/.292.

On July 14, 2016, Arredondo was traded to the Leones de Yucatán. He finished the season with the team, notching 13 hits in 40 at-bats. On March 14, 2017, Arredondo was traded to the Bravos de León. In 68 games for the club, he posted a batting line of .319/.364/.430. The next year, Arredondo played in 85 games for the club, notching 88 hits. He began the 2019 season with the team, but was released on May 21, 2019 after hitting .265 in 26 games.

On April 21, 2021, Arredondo signed with El Águila de Veracruz of the Mexican League. On July 3, 2021, Arredondo announced he would play in his final game as an active player. He retired after the contest, a 9-7 win for Veracruz.

== Coaching career ==
On December 22, 2021, Arredondo was named manager of the Bravos de León of the Mexican League. He was fired on May 14, 2022, after the team started the season with a 8-11 record.
