= Julio Rivera Lopez Stadium =

Stadium in Hormigueros, Puerto Rico

- Location: Hormigueros, Puerto Rico
- Capacity: 620

Julio Rivera Lopez Stadium is a stadium in Hormigueros, Puerto Rico. It hosted some of the Softball events for the 2010 Central American and Caribbean Games.
