= Megan Faraimo =

American softball player (born 2000)

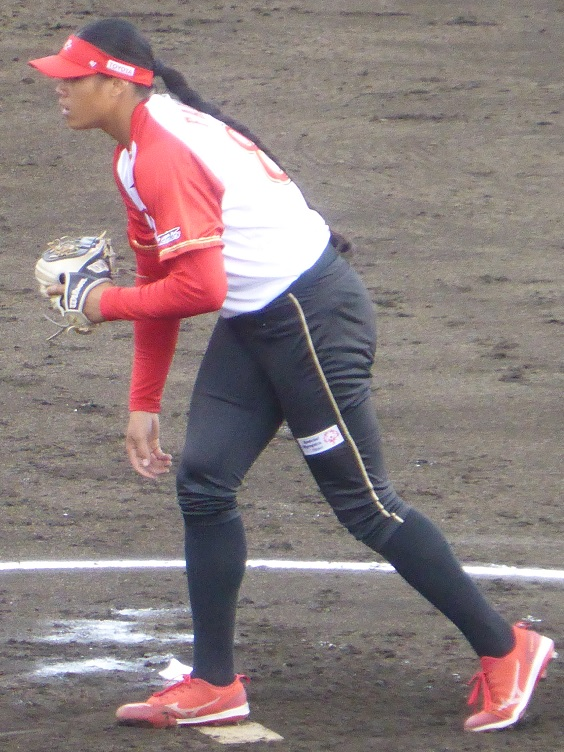

Utah Talons – No. 80
- Pitcher
- Born: July 14, 2000 (age 26); San Diego, California, U.S.

Teams
- UCLA (2019–2023); Toyota Red Terriers (2023–2024); Diablos Rojos del México (2025); Utah Talons (2025–present)

Career highlights and awards
- 2× AUSL champion (2025, 2026); Women's College World Series champion (2019); WCWS All-Tournament Team (2022); Pac-12 Freshman of the Year (2019); Softball America Pitcher of the Year (2020); 2× Pac-12 Pitcher of the Year (2022, 2023); 2× First team All-American (2021, 2023); Second team All-American (2022); 4× First team All-Pac 12 (2019, 2021–2023); Pac-12 All-Freshman team (2019)
Medals
Women's softball
Representing United States
World Cup
Silver medal – second place	2024 Castions di Strada	Team
World Games
Gold medal – first place	2022 Birmingham	Team
Gold medal – first place	2025 Chengdu	Team

Megan Ki'llani Faraimo (born July 14, 2000) is an American professional softball pitcher for the Utah Talons of the Athletes Unlimited Softball League (AUSL). She previously played for the Diablos Rojos del México of the Mexican Softball League. She played college softball at UCLA from 2019 to 2023, where she was named a three-time All-American by the National Fastpitch Coaches Association (NFCA). As a sophomore in 2020, she was named Softball America Pitcher of the Year. Faraimo played in Athletes Unlimited Softball, where she named the 2023 Athletes Unlimited Rookie of the Year.

== High school career ==
Faraimo attended Cathedral Catholic High School in San Diego, California where she was a two-sport star, playing volleyball for three years, and softball for four years. As a junior in 2017, she went 27–1 with a 0.60 earned run average (ERA) and 251 strikeouts in 175 1/3 innings to help lead CCHS to a CIF-SDS Open Division title, as well as a Western League championship. Following the season she was named CIF-SDS Pitcher of the Year and Western League Most Valuable Player.

As a senior in 2018, she went 26–3 in 2018, with a 0.23 ERA and 405 strikeouts in 186 1/3 innings and allowed just 47 hits and eight walks. She had 17 shutouts and five no-hitters, including four perfect games. Her 405 strikeouts were the second-highest single-season total in CIF-SDS history. Following an outstanding season, she was named Gatorade National Softball Player of the Year, and San Diego Union-Tribune Pitcher of the Year. She was the No. 1 recruit in the class of 2018 according to FloSoftball and Extra Inning Softball. She finished her career with 1,029 strikeouts, and with the school's all-time record for most wins (78), shutouts (45) and perfect games (five).

== College career ==
Faraimo began her collegiate career for the UCLA Bruins in 2019. During her freshman year she appeared in 27 games, with 21 starts, and posted a 16–4 record with a 1.41 ERA and 143 strikeouts in 114 innings. She threw 11 complete games, six solo shutouts, and two no-hitters, while holding opponents to a .166 batting average. She was a five-time Pac-12 Freshman of the Week honoree. She ranked third among Pac-12 pitchers in ERA and opponents batting average, tied for seventh in wins and eighth in strikeouts. Following an outstanding season, she was named Pac-12 Conference Freshman of the Year, All-Pac-12 First Team, Pac-12 All-Freshman Team, and was a top-ten finalist for the NFCA National Freshman of the Year.

During her sophomore year in 2020, she led the Bruins with a 13–1 record, a 0.85 ERA and 149 strikeouts in 90 1/3 innings. She pitched complete games in all 10 of her starts, including five shutouts and limited opponents to a .153 batting average. She ended the season with a streak of 25 2/3 consecutive scoreless innings, before the season was cancelled due to the COVID-19 pandemic. She ranked first among all pitchers in the nation in strikeout-to-walk ratio (29.80), second in strikeouts, tied for second in wins, fourth in walks allowed per seven innings (0.39), and tied for sixth in shutouts. She ranked first among Pac-12 pitchers in ERA, opposing batting average, strikeouts and wins and second in innings pitched. Following the season she was named Softball America Pitcher of the Year.

During her redshirt sophomore year in 2021, she appeared in 28 games, with 19 starts, and posted a 19–3 record, a 1.10 ERA and 184 strikeouts in 133 1/3 innings. On February 24, 2021, she pitched the 19th perfect game in UCLA program history. She recorded five strikeouts, and threw just 64 pitches with a 67.2 strike percentage, in a 14–0 victory against San Diego State. On April 17, 2021, she recorded a career-high 17 strikeouts in a one-hit shutout against Oklahoma State. She finished the season with 13 complete games, including eight shutouts and limited opponents to a .142 batting average. She allowed zero or one earned run in 22 of her 28 appearances. She ranked first among Pac-12 pitchers in opposing batting average, second in ERA, fourth in strikeouts and tied for fourth in wins, and led the nation in strikeout-to-walk ratio (14.15). Following the season she was named a finalist for USA Softball Collegiate Player of the Year, All-Pac-12 First Team, and NFCA First-Team All-American.

During her redshirt-junior year in 2022, she posted a 22–4 record, with seven saves, a 1.78 ERA, and 244 strikeouts in 157 1/3 innings. She led the Pac-12 in strikeouts (244), batters struck out while looking (59), saves (6) and appearances (35). She ranks second in program history in solo perfect games (3) and holds the single-season saves record (7). Following an outstanding season, she was named the Pac-12 Conference Pitcher of the Year and a second-team All-American. She became the second player in conference history to win both Pac-12 Freshman of the Year and Pitcher of the Year in a career, after Rachel Garcia.

During her redshirt-senior year in 2023, she posted a 28–2 record, with a 1.11 ERA, and 215 strikeouts. She led the NCAA in wins and became the fourth pitcher in UCLA history to surpass 100 career wins. Following an outstanding the season she was named a finalist for USA Softball Collegiate Player of the Year, All-Pac-12 First Team, and the Pac-12 Conference Pitcher of the Year for the second consecutive year.

== Professional career ==
On April 17, 2023, Faraimo was drafted fourth overall by the USSSA Pride in the 2023 Women's Professional Fastpitch draft. On May 8, 2023, Faraimo was drafted second overall in the 2023 Athletes Unlimited Softball college draft, officially signing on to compete in both the 2023 AUX Softball Season and 2023 Championship Season on May 31, 2023. On August 6, 2023, Faraimo became the second pitcher in Athletes Unlimited history to throw a no-hitter. On August 27, 2023, she was named Athletes Unlimited Rookie of the Year.

In 2023, Faraimo signed with the Toyota Red Terriers of the Japan Diamond Softball League, winning a league championship (Diamond Series) in her rookie year. In 2024, Faraimo won the Outstanding Player Award after the Red Terriers repeated as Diamond Series Grand Champions. In 2025, Faraimo led the Red Terriers to a third consecutive league championship by pitching a complete game in the Diamond Series final.

On December 14, 2024, Faraimo signed with the Diablos Rojos del México of the Mexican Softball League (LMS). On January 26, 2025, she threw the first perfect game in the history of the LMS in the Diablos Rojos 6–0 victory against El Águila de Veracruz. On March 9, 2025, Faraimo won the Triple Crown for pitching by finishing the regular season as the league leader in ERA (1.33), strikeouts (130) and wins (14). On March 21, 2025, Diablos Rojos won their first LMS championship by completing a three-game sweep of Sultanes de Monterrey in the Queen's Series (Serie de la Reina).

On January 29, 2025, Faraimo was drafted third overall by the Talons in the inaugural Athletes Unlimited Softball League draft. During the 2025 AUSL season, she appeared in 14 games, with six starts, and posted a 3–1 record, and ranked second in the league with 40 strikeouts. During game one of the championship series against the Bandits, she earned the save and helped the Talons win the inaugural AUSL championship.

== International career ==
Faraimo represented the United States at the 2019 U-19 Women's Softball World Cup. She finished the tournament with three wins and allowing no walks, one earned run, eight hits and 43 strikeouts in 21 2/3 innings, with a 0.32 ERA. She opened the tournament with a four-inning perfect game on August 10, 2019, against Mexico, striking out all 12 batters she faced. Three days later against Canada, she was a part of a combined perfect game, striking out eight in three innings. She pitched a complete game on August 15 against Japan, striking out 14 in the victory and giving up just three hits. In the gold medal game against Japan on August 17, she struck out nine in 7 2/3 innings, allowing one earned run and five hits, to help USA win gold.

Faraimo represented the United States at the 2024 Women's Softball World Cup and won a silver medal. She represented the United States at the World Games, winning a gold medal in 2022 and 2025.

== Personal life ==
Faraimo was born to Marcie and Bill Faraimo. She has a sister, Muta, and two brothers, Matthew and Madden. Matthew was a member of the USC Trojans men's volleyball team from 2017 to 2020. Madden is a member of "The Fighting Irish" and plays football at Notre Dame. She is of Samoan and Hawaiian descent.
