= 2024 Mexican Softball League season =

- League: Mexican Softball League
- Sport: Softball
- Duration: 25 January – 16 March
- Games: 71
- Teams: 6

Serie de la Reina
- Champions: Charros de Jalisco
- Runners-up: Sultanes de Monterrey
- Finals MVP: Yeraldine Carrión

LMS seasons
- 2025 →

The 2024 Mexican Softball League season was the inaugural season of the Mexican Softball League (LMS), the first professional softball league in Latin America. It was contested by six teams, all of them softball sides of Mexican League baseball teams: Bravos de León, Charros de Jalisco, Diablos Rojos del México, El Águila de Veracruz, Olmecas de Tabasco and Sultanes de Monterrey.

The season started on 25 January and ended on 16 March. Charros de Jalisco won the championship after defeating Sultanes de Monterrey in the final series 3 games to 1. Yeraldine Carrión, pitcher for the Charros, won the MVP award of the final series.

== Standings ==
Regular season standings
Rank	Team	G	W	L	Pct.	GB
1	Sultanes de Monterrey	24	15	9	.625	–
2	Charros de Jalisco	23	14	9	.609	0.5
3	Diablos Rojos del México	24	14	10	.583	1.0
4	El Águila de Veracruz	24	12	12	.500	3.0
5	Olmecas de Tabasco	24	11	13	.458	4.0
6	Bravas de León	23	5	18	.217	9.5

== Postseason ==
Semifinals
1	Sultanes de Monterrey	3
4	El Águila de Veracruz	2
2	Charros de Jalisco	3
3	Diablos Rojos del México	0

Serie de la Reina
1	Sultanes de Monterrey	1
2	Charros de Jalisco	3

=== Semifinals ===
Sultanes de Monterrey won the series, 3–2.

Game	Date	Score	Location	Time	Attendance
1	5 March	Monterrey – 1, Veracruz – 0	Estadio Universitario Beto Ávila	2:50	-
2	6 March	Monterrey – 3, Veracruz – 4	Estadio Universitario Beto Ávila	3:09	-
3	8 March	Veracruz – 1, Monterrey – 3	Estadio Mobil Super	2:13	5,404
4	9 March	Veracruz – 5, Monterrey – 1	Estadio Mobil Super	2:35	4,783
5	10 March	Veracruz – 2, Monterrey – 5	Estadio Mobil Super	3:10	4,308

Charros de Jalisco won the series, 3–0.

Game	Date	Score	Location	Time	Attendance
1	5 March	Jalisco – 6, México – 3	Estadio de Beisbol de Ciudad Universitaria	2:48	900
2	6 March	Jalisco – 11, México – 10	Estadio de Beisbol de Ciudad Universitaria	3:22	1,010
3	8 March	México – 1, Jalisco – 13	Estadio Panamericano	2:56	2,414

=== Serie de la Reina ===
==== Summary ====
Charros de Jalisco won the series, 3–1.

Game	Date	Score	Location	Time	Attendance
1	12 March	Monterrey – 1, Jalisco – 3	Estadio Panamericano	2:41	2,487
2	13 March	Monterrey – 3, Jalisco – 1	Estadio Panamericano	2:30	3,063
3	15 March	Jalisco – 4, Monterrey – 2	Estadio Mobil Super	2:33	8,349
4	16 March	Jalisco – 6, Monterrey – 0	Estadio Mobil Super	2:32	5,932

== League leaders ==
Batting leaders
Stat	Player	Team	Total
AVG	(Cuba) Leannelys Zayas	México	.479
HR	(Mexico) Karime Valles	Jalisco	6
RBI	(Venezuela) Yuruby Alicart	Jalisco	21
RBI	(Cuba) Yilián Rondón	Tabasco	21
R	(Cuba) Leannelys Zayas	México	29
H	(Cuba) Leannelys Zayas	México	35
SB	(Venezuela) Yakary Molina	México	5
SB	(United States) Claudia López	Monterrey	5

Pitching leaders
Stat	Player	Team	Total
W	(Mexico) Yanina Treviño	Monterrey	11
ERA	(Mexico) Yeraldine Carrión	Jalisco	1.44
K	(Cuba) Yilián Tornés	Veracruz	141
SV	(Mexico) Yeraldine Carrión	Jalisco	2
