= 2025 Mexican Softball League season =

- League: Mexican Softball League
- Sport: Softball
- Duration: 23 January – 21 March
- Games: 123
- Teams: 8

Serie de la Reina
- Champions: Diablos Rojos del México
- Runners-up: Sultanes de Monterrey
- Finals MVP: Jazmyn Jackson

LMS seasons
- ← 2024 2026 →

The 2025 Mexican Softball League season was the second season of the Mexican Softball League (LMS). It was contested by eight teams. Two new clubs joined the league for the 2025 season: the Algodoneras de Unión Laguna, the softball section of Unión Laguna of the Mexican League, and the Naranjeras de Hermosillo, the softball section of Hermosillo of the Mexican Pacific League (LMP), marking the first LMP team to join the league.

The season started on 23 January and ended on 21 March. Diablos Rojos del México won the championship by sweeping the Sultanes de Monterrey in three games during the Serie de la Reina, the LMS championship series. Jazmyn Jackson, infielder for the Diablos, won the MVP award of the final series.

== Standings ==
Regular season standings
Rank	Team	G	W	L	Pct.	GB
1	Diablos Rojos del México	28	23	5	.821	–
2	Bravas de León	28	20	8	.714	3.0
3	Sultanes de Monterrey	28	19	9	.679	4.0
4	Charros de Jalisco	28	13	15	.464	10.0
5	Olmecas de Tabasco	28	12	16	.429	11.0
6	El Águila de Veracruz (softball)	28	12	16	.429	11.0
7	Naranjeras de Hermosillo	28	7	21	.250	16.0
8	Algodoneras de Unión Laguna	28	6	22	.214	17.0

== Postseason ==
Semifinals
1	Diablos Rojos del México	3
4	Charros de Jalisco	1
2	Bravas de León	1
3	Sultanes de Monterrey	3

Serie de la Reina
1	Diablos Rojos del México	3
3	Sultanes de Monterrey	0

=== Serie de la Reina ===
==== Summary ====
Diablos Rojos del México won the series, 3–0.

Game	Date	Score	Location	Time	Attendance
1	18 March	México – 7, Monterrey – 6	Estadio Mobil Super	2:57	7,910
2	19 March	México – 6, Monterrey – 4	Estadio Mobil Super	3:08	6,580
3	21 March	Monterrey – 0, México – 5	Estadio Alfredo Harp Helú	2:07	12,424

== League leaders ==
Batting leaders
Stat	Player	Team	Total
AVG	(United States) Jazmyn Jackson	México	.519
HR	(United States) Jazmyn Jackson	México	10
RBI	(United States) Jazmyn Jackson	México	32
RBI	(United States) Baylee Klingler	Monterrey	32
R	(United States) Jazmyn Jackson	México	36
R	(Netherlands) Suka van Gurp	Monterrey	36
H	(Cuba) Leannelys Zayas	México	40
H	(United States) Jazmyn Jackson	México	40
H	(United States) Ciara Bryan	Unión Laguna	40
SB	(United States) Ciara Bryan	Unión Laguna	11
SB	(United States) Destini Brown	Tabasco	11

Pitching leaders
Stat	Player	Team	Total
W	(United States) Megan Faraimo	México	14
ERA	(United States) Megan Faraimo	México	1.33
K	(United States) Megan Faraimo	México	130
SV	(Cuba) Yamerki Guevara	México	3

== Milestones ==
=== Pitchers ===
==== Perfect games ====
- Megan Faraimo (MEX): On 26 January, Faraimo threw the first perfect game in the history of the LMS in the Diablos Rojos 6–0 victory against El Águila de Veracruz.

=== Team ===
- Sultanes de Monterrey: On 23 January, in the season's opening day, the Sultanes scored 40 runs in a 40–2 blowout over the Algodoneras de Unión Laguna, setting a new league record for runs scored in a game.
