= Estadio Domingo Santana TV4 =

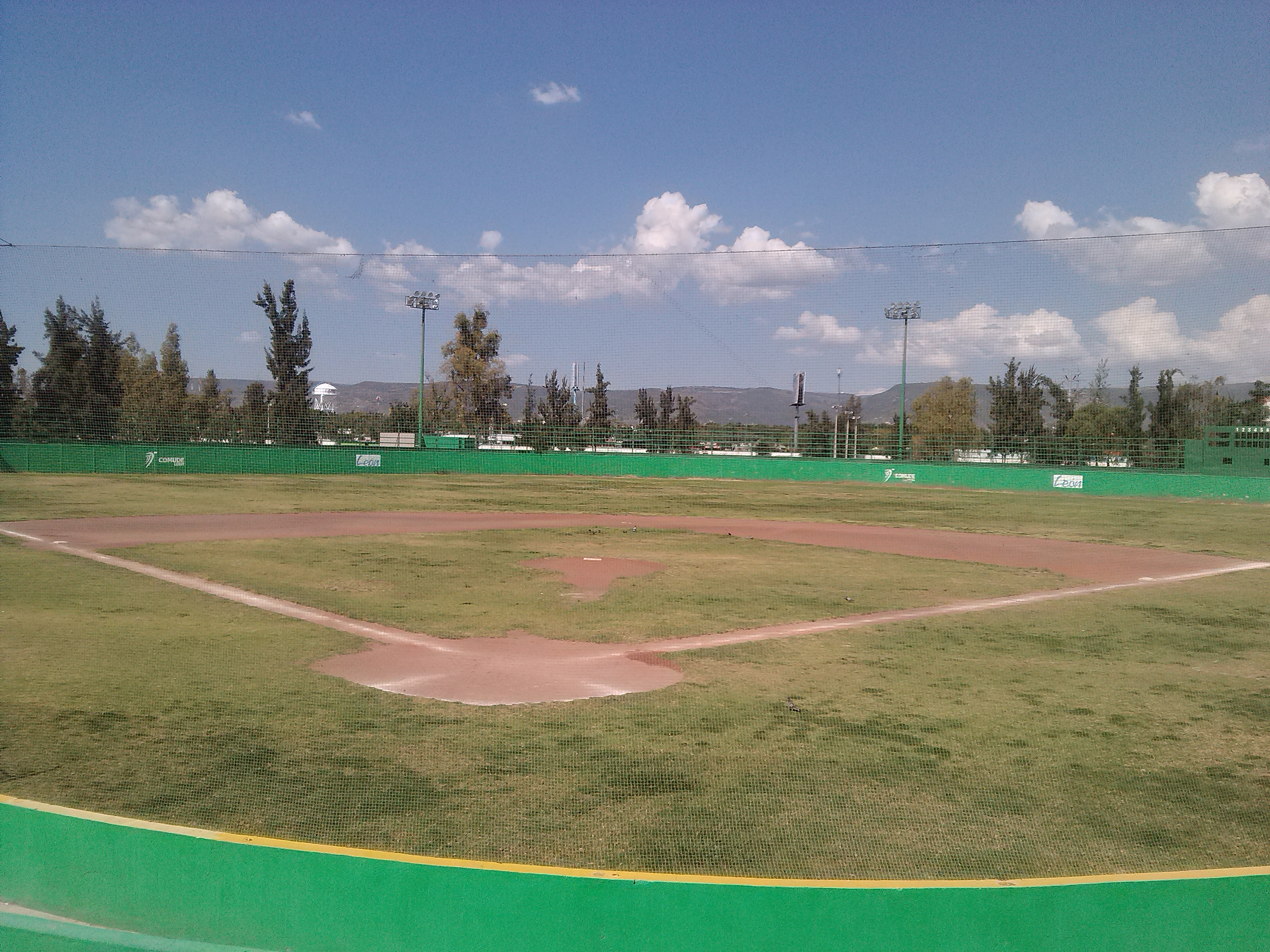
- Interactive map of Estadio Domingo Santana TV4
- Location: León, Guanajuato, Mexico
- Coordinates: 21.145462°N 101.659543°W
- Owner: The City of León
- Capacity: 6,500
- Surface: Grass
- Field size: Left field: 330 feet (100 m); Center field: 410 feet (120 m); Right field: 330 feet (100 m)

Construction
- Built: 1971–1973
- Opened: 1973
- Renovated: 2014
- Cost: $2,500,000

Tenants
- Cachorros de León (LMB) 1979–1980; Bravos de León (LMB) 1983–1991, 2017–present

The Estadio Domingo Santana, also referred to as Estadio Domingo Santana TV4 for sponsorship reasons, is a baseball stadium located in León, Guanajuato, Mexico. It has been home ballpark of the Bravos de León of the Mexican League since 2017. They previously played there from 1983 to 1991. It was also home to the Mexican League's Cachorros de León from 1979 to 1980. In addition to Minor League Baseball, it has also been used for municipal and state events and music concerts.

The stadium opened on 2 September 1973 is named after Domingo Santana, baseball player and manager born in Guanajuato. Mexican President Luis Echeverría, state Governor Manuel M. Moreno, and Miss Guanajuato 1973 Alicia Elena Cardona Gómez were present at the inaugural game.

The stadium was renovated in 2014. The repairs included replacing the grass playing field, installing a new irrigation system, adding protective netting, building new dressing rooms and bathrooms, installing new lighting, and painting. The stadium was reopened with a game between the Acereros de Monclova and the Rieleros de Aguascalientes. The Acereros were using the stadium for preseason practice before the season began.
