= Santiago Llorens Stadium =

Softball stadium in Mayagüez, Puerto Rico

Coordinates: 18°12′14.72″N 67°08′03.40″W

- La Liga de París
- Interactive map of Santiago Llorens Stadium
- Location: Mayagüez, Puerto Rico
- Capacity: 500

Santiago Llorens Stadium is a softball stadium in Mayagüez. It is located close to the Palacio de Recreación y Deportes. It will host the softball competition for the 2010 Central American and Caribbean Games.

It was commonly nicknamed as Liga de París (Paris Ward Baseball League Yard)
