= Mariangee Bogado =

Venezuelan softball player

- Pitcher
- Born: 4 July 1984 (age 40); Mariara, Venezuela
- Bats: Right Throws: Right
Medals
Women's softball
Representing Venezuela
Central American and Caribbean Games
Gold medal – first place	2002 San Salvador	Team
Gold medal – first place	2006 Cartagena de Indias	Team
Gold medal – first place	2010 Mayagüez	Team

Mariangee Bogado (born 4 July 1984) is a Venezuelan softball player. She competed for Venezuela at the 2008 Summer Olympics.

== Career ==
Bogado was born on 4 July 1984 in Mariara, Carabobo, Venezuela. She moved to the United States in 2003 and studied at Indiana University, majoring in Criminology. She also played for the Indiana University softball team from 2004 to 2006.

== International career ==
Bogado represented Venezuela at the 2008 Summer Olympics, where the Venezuelan team finished seventh with a 2–5 record. In seven games she recorded two wins (against the Netherlands and Canada) and three losses (against China, Japan and Australia), a 3.76 ERA and nine strikeouts in 22.3 innings pitched.

She is a triple gold medal winner in the Central American and Caribbean Games, winning the San Salvador 2002, Cartagena de Indias 2006 and Mayagüez 2010 tournaments.

== Career statistics ==
=== International ===
Team	Year	G	W	L	IP	H	R	ER	BB	SO	ERA	WHIP
Venezuela	2008	7	2	3	22.3	23	14	12	13	9	3.76	1.61
Total		7	2	3	22.3	23	14	12	13	9	3.76	1.61
