= Geraldine Puertas =

Venezuelan softball player (born 1988)

Charros de Jalisco – No. 44
- Infielder
- Born: 8 June 1988 (age 37); Barquisimeto, Lara, Venezuela
- Bats: Right Throws: Right

Teams
- Charros de Jalisco (2024–present)

Career highlights and awards
- Mexican Softball League champion (2024)
Medals
Women's softball
Representing Venezuela
World Games
Silver medal – second place	2013 Cali	Team competition

Geraldine Puertas (born 8 June 1988) is a Venezuelan softball player for the Charros de Jalisco of the Mexican Softball League. She competed in the women's tournament at the 2008 Summer Olympics.
