= Zuleyma Cirimele =

Venezuelan softball player

- Catcher / Manager
- Born: 26 May 1967 (age 58); Maracay, Aragua, Venezuela

Teams
- As manager: Olmecas de Tabasco (2025)

Zuleyma Cirimele Heredia (born 26 May 1967) is a Venezuelan softball manager and former catcher who last served as the manager of the Olmecas de Tabasco of the Mexican Softball League. She competed for Venezuela in the women's tournament at the 2008 Summer Olympics.

== Career ==
Cirimele was born on 26 May 1967 in Maracay, Venezuela. She first represented her country at the 1981 Junior Women's Softball World Championship held in Edmonton, where the Venezuelan squad finished last.

In 2008, Cirimele was part of the softball team that qualified for the first time to the Olympics; aged 41, she was the oldest player in the squad. In the tournament, held in Beijing, Venezuela finished seventh with a 2–5 record. In six games, she recorded two hits two RBI and an .167 batting average.

== Coaching career ==
Cirimele coached Saronno Softball of the Serie A1 Softball during the 2024 season.

On 11 December 2024 she was appointed head coach of the Olmecas de Tabasco of the Mexican Softball League ahead of the 2025 season. Before the final game of the season, Cirimele left the team and was replaced by Martín Botello.
