= Marianella Castellanos =

Venezuelan softball player

- Pitcher
- Born: 15 April 1984 (age 40); Acarigua, Portuguesa, Venezuela
- Bats: Right Throws: Right
Medals
Women's softball
Representing Venezuela
Central American and Caribbean Games
Gold medal – first place	2002 San Salvador	Team
Gold medal – first place	2006 Cartagena de Indias	Team

Marianella Castellanos (born 15 April 1984) is a Venezuelan softball player. She competed for Venezuela at the 2008 Summer Olympics.

== Career ==
Castellanos played college softball at Seminole State College from 2002 to 2003 and was honored to the 2003 NJCAA Division I All-Tournament Team.

== International career ==
Bogado represented Venezuela at the 2008 Summer Olympics, where the Venezuelan team finished seventh with a 2–5 record. She played as a relief pitcher in three games (against United States, China and Japan), recording a 10.50 ERA and one strikeout in 4.2 innings pitched

She won the gold medal with the Venezuelan team at the San Salvador 2002 and Cartagena de Indias 2006 editions of the Central American and Caribbean Games.

== Career statistics ==
=== International ===
Team	Year	G	W	L	IP	H	R	ER	BB	SO	HR	ERA	WHIP
Venezuela	2008	3	0	0	4.2	8	7	7	3	1	1	10.50	2.36
Total		3	0	0	4.2	8	7	7	3	1	1	10.50	2.36
