= Sultanes de Monterrey (softball) =

Mexican professional women's softball team

- Logo

Information
- League: Mexican Softball League
- Location: Monterrey, Nuevo León, Mexico
- Ballpark: Estadio de Beisbol Monterrey
- Founded: 20 September 2023; 2 years ago
- Serie de la Reina championships: 1 (2026)
- Colors: Dark blue and turquoise
- Manager: Rafael Guzmán

Current uniforms
Home	Away

The Sultanes de Monterrey are a Mexican professional women's softball team based in Monterrey, Nuevo León. The Sultanes compete in the Mexican Softball League (LMS).

== History ==
The Mexican Softball League (LMS) was established on 20 September 2023 as the first professional softball league in Latin America. The Sultanes de Monterrey were one of the founding members of the league, alongside Bravos de León, Charros de Jalisco, Diablos Rojos del México, El Águila de Veracruz, and Olmecas de Tabasco; all of the teams were affiliated to baseball clubs from the Mexican League.

The Sultanes debuted with a 1–0 win against El Águila de Veracruz on 25 January 2024, on the opening day of the inaugural season of the Mexican Softball League. The game, played in the Estadio de Beisbol Monterrey had a record attendance of 13,408 spectators. The winning pitcher, Yanina Treviño, threw the first no-hitter in the history of the league, allowing only two base on balls in seven innings.

Treviño threw another no hitter on 22 February 2024 in the Sultanes 2–0 victory against the Charros de Jalisco in the Estadio Panamericano, again giving only two base on balls.

The team finished the 2024 regular season in first place with a 15–9 record. In the postseason, the Sultanes defeated El Águila de Veracruz 3 games to 2. In the final series, the Serie de la Reina (Queen's Series), the Sultanes faced the Charros de Jalisco, losing the series in four games, 1–3. Yanina Treviño finished the season as the leader in wins with 11.

== Roster ==
As of January 2026

Position	No.	Name	Age	Height	Bats	Throws
Players
Pitchers	0	(United States) Samantha Show	age 29	1.83 m (6 ft 0 in)	Right	Right
Pitchers	29	(Mexico) Yanina Treviño	age 24	1.69 m (5 ft 6 1/2 in)	Right	Right
Pitchers	33	(United States) Payton Gottshall	age 24	1.75 m (5 ft 9 in)	Right	Right
Pitchers	85	(Mexico) Ana Estrella	age 18		Right	Right
Catchers	14	(Mexico) Eimy Molina	age 18		Right	Right
Catchers	77	(Mexico) Tahily Medina	age 22		Right	Right
Infielders	3	(United States) Baylee Klingler	age 26	1.73 m (5 ft 8 in)	Right	Right
Infielders	11	(Curaçao) Soclaina Van Gurp	age 31	1.67 m (5 ft 5 1/2 in)	Right	Right
Infielders	12	(Mexico) Erika García	age 37		Right	Right
Infielders	24	(Mexico) Nalleli López	age 30		Right	Right
Infielders	25	(Mexico) Marcia Merino	age 22	1.57 m (5 ft 2 in)	Right	Right
Infielders	27	(Mexico) Alexandra Piña	age 21		Left	Right
Infielders	72	(Mexico) Sofía Treviño	age 18		Right	Right
Outfielders	6	(United States) Savannah Wysocki	age 26	1.65 m (5 ft 5 in)	Left	Right
Outfielders	8	(Mexico) Karina Pérez	age 24		Right	Right
Outfielders	14	(Cuba) Yarianna López	age 33		Right	Right
Outfielders	16	(Mexico) Denise Pérez	age 30		Right	Right
Outfielders	18	(United States) Alana Snow	age 27	1.75 m (5 ft 9 in)	Left	Right
Outfielders	47	(United States) Morgan Howe	age 28	1.70 m (5 ft 7 in)	Left	Right
Outfielders	92	(Mexico) Sol Barreras	age 21		Right	Right
Coaches
Manager	--	(United States) Rafael Guzmán		–	–	–

== Season-by-season ==
Season	League	Finish	Wins	Loses	Win%	GB	Postseason	Manager
2024	LMS	1st	15	9	.625	–	Lost Serie de la Reina (Jalisco) 1–3	(Mexico) Nancy Prieto
2025	LMS	3rd	19	9	.679	4.0	Lost Serie de la Reina (México) 0–3	(Mexico) Julio Guerrero
