= Estadio Centenario Orsan =

Baseball stadium in Villahermosa, Mexico

- Interactive map of Estadio Centenario Orsan
- Location: Ciudad Deportiva Col. Atasta Serra, CP 86100; Villahermosa, Tabasco, Mexico
- Coordinates: 17°58′36″N 92°56′39″W
- Capacity: 6,600
- Field size: Left Field: 335 feet (102 m); Center Field: 380 feet (120 m); 335 feet (102 m)

Construction
- Opened: 27 February 1964

Tenants
- Cardenales de Tabasco (LMB); Plataneros Tabasco (VWL); Olmecas de Tabasco (LMB)

The Parque de Béisbol Centenario del 27 de Febrero, also referred to as Estadio Centenario Orsan for sponsorship reasons, is a stadium in Villahermosa, Mexico. It is primarily used for baseball and serves as the home stadium for the Olmecas de Tabasco. The stadium has a capacity of 6,600 people and is named in honor of the Battle of San Juan Bautista, which was fought nearby.
