= Yuruby Alicart =

Venezuelan softball player (born 1985)

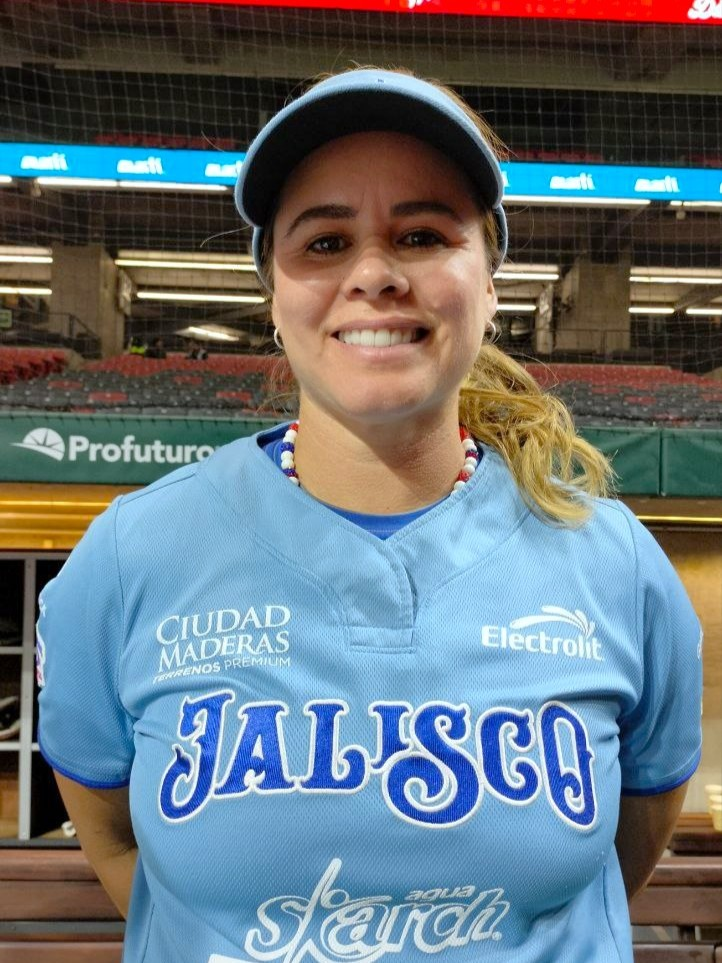
- Alicart in 2025

Charros de Jalisco – No. 1
- Infielder / Manager
- Born: 25 August 1985 (age 40); Maracay, Venezuela
- Bats: Right Throws: Right

Teams
- As player: Charros de Jalisco (2024–2025); As manager: Charros de Jalisco (2026–present)

Career highlights and awards
- Mexican Softball League champion (2024)
Medals
Women's softball
Representing Venezuela
World Games
Silver medal – second place	2013 Cali	Team competition

Yuruby Rosaura Alicart Ramírez (born 25 August 1985) is a Venezuelan professional softball manager and former infielder who is the manager of the Charros de Jalisco of the Mexican Softball League. She competed for Venezuela at the 2008 Summer Olympics.

== Career ==
Alicart played college softball at Florida State University from Fall 2005 to Spring 2007, where she majored in Criminology and set the FSU single-season record with 19 doubles in 2006. She was named to the Atlantic Coast Conference All-Conference team in 2006 and 2007.

In December 2023, Alicart was signed by the Charros de Jalisco of the Mexican Softball League and later chosen as the team's captain. She finished the 2024 season as the league leader in runs batted in with 21 and won the Mexican Softball League championship.

Alicart announced her retirement after the 2025 Mexican Softball League season. In June 2025, she was appointed manager of the Charros ahead of the 2026 season.

== International career ==
Alicart represented Venezuela at the 2008 Summer Olympics, where the Venezuelan team finished seventh with a 2–5 record.

== Career statistics ==
=== College ===
Team	Year	G	AB	R	H	2B	3B	HR	RBI	SB	BB	BA
Florida State	2006	74	219	51	73	19	4	12	54	3	18	.333
Florida State	2007	69	204	53	66	17	1	14	56	2	25	.324
Total		143	423	104	139	36	5	26	110	5	43	.329
