= Yusmary Pérez =

Venezuelan softball player (born 1980)

Personal information
- Full name: Yusmary Mercedes Pérez Medina
- Born: 10 November 1980 (age 45) Acarigua, Venezuela

Sport
- Sport: Softball
Medal record
Women's softball
Representing Venezuela
World Games
Silver medal – second place	2013 Cali	Team competition

Yusmary Mercedes Pérez Medina (born 10 November 1980) is a Venezuelan softball player. She competed in the women's tournament at the 2008 Summer Olympics.
