= Johana Gómez (softball) =

Venezuelan softball player

- Pitcher
- Born: 4 February 1989 (age 37); Acarigua, Portuguesa, Venezuela
- Bats: Right Throws: Right
Medals
Women's softball
Representing Venezuela
Central American and Caribbean Games
Gold medal – first place	2006 Cartagena de Indias	Team
Gold medal – first place	2010 Mayagüez	Team

Johana Gómez (born 4 February 1989) is a Venezuelan softball player. She competed for Venezuela at the 2008 Summer Olympics.

== Career ==
Gómez represented Venezuela at the 2008 Summer Olympics, where the Venezuelan team finished seventh with a 2–5 record. She played four games and lost two, against United States and Chinese Taipei. She recorded a 6.63 ERA and five strikeouts in 12.4 innings pitched.

She won the gold medal with the Venezuelan team at the Cartagena de Indias 2006 and Mayagüez 2010 editions of the Central American and Caribbean Games.

Gómez played college softball for Lee University in 2009 and 2010. In 2010 she was recognized with the NAIA Pitcher of the Year and the Southern States Athletic Conference Player of the Year awards. She was inducted into the Lee University Athletics Hall of Fame in 2017.

== Career statistics ==
=== International ===
Team	Year	G	W	L	IP	H	R	ER	BB	SO	HR	ERA	WHIP
Venezuela	2008	4	0	2	12.4	19	14	12	5	5	6	6.63	1.89
Total		4	0	2	12.4	19	14	12	5	5	6	6.63	1.89
