= Yaicey Sojo =

Venezuelan softball player (born 1987)

Personal information
- Born: 13 April 1987 (age 39) Maracay, Venezuela

Sport
- Sport: Softball
Medal record
Women's softball
Representing Venezuela
World Games
Silver medal – second place	2013 Cali	Team competition

Yaicey Sojo (born 13 April 1987) is a Venezuelan softball player. She competed in the women's tournament at the 2008 Summer Olympics.
