= Maribel Riera =

Venezuelan softball player

Personal information
- Born: 7 January 1980 (age 46) Chichiriviche, Venezuela

Sport
- Sport: Softball

Maribel Riera (born 7 January 1980) is a Venezuelan softball player. She competed in the women's tournament at the 2008 Summer Olympics.
