= Rubilena Rojas =

Venezuelan softball player

- Infielder / Coach
- Born: 11 August 1981 (age 44); Maracay, Venezuela
- Bats: Right Throws: Right

Rubilena Rojas (born 11 August 1981) is a Venezuelan softball player. She competed in the women's softball tournament at the 2008 Summer Olympics.

== Career ==
Rojas was born in Maracay, Venezuela on 11 August 1981. When she was 10 years old, her family moved from Venezuela to Santa Ana, California. She played college softball at University of Virginia, winning the Atlantic Coast Conference Softball Rookie Of The Year in 2000.

She represented Venezuela at the 2008 Summer Olympics, where the Venezuelan team finished seventh with a 2–5 record.

Currently, Rojas is the head coach of the Mt. San Antonio College softball team. She was also an assistant coach for the Auburn University softball team from 2019 to 2020.
