= Jineth Pimentel =

Venezuelan softball player (born 1986)

Personal information
- Born: 23 April 1986 (age 40) Aragua de Barcelona, Venezuela

Sport
- Sport: Softball
Medal record
Women's softball
Representing Venezuela
World Games
Silver medal – second place	2013 Cali	Team competition

Jineth Pimentel (born 23 April 1986) is a Venezuelan softball player. She competed in the women's tournament at the 2008 Summer Olympics.
