= Denisse Fuenmayor =

Venezuelan softball player and coach

- Shortstop / Manager
- Born: 17 May 1979 (age 47); Guacara, Carabobo, Venezuela

Teams
- As manager: Diablos Rojos del México (2024–2026)
Medals
Women's softball
Representing Venezuela
World Games
Silver medal – second place	2013 Cali	Team

Denisse del Carmen Fuenmayor Arcila (born 17 May 1979) is a Venezuelan softball player and coach. She competed for Venezuela at the 2008 Summer Olympics. Fuenmayor managed the Diablos Rojos del México of the Mexican Softball League from 2024 to 2026, leading the team to the 2025 championship.
