= Mexican Softball League =

Professional women's softball league

- Current season, competition or edition: 2026 Mexican Softball League season
- Sport: Softball
- Founded: 2023
- No. of teams: 8
- Country: Mexico
- Headquarters: Mexico City
- Most recent champions: Sultanes de Monterrey (1st title)
- Most titles: Charros de Jalisco (1 title); Diablos Rojos del México (1 title); Sultanes de Monterrey (1 title)
- Broadcasters: AYM Sports; Canal Once; Claro (Note: includes Claro Sports); ESPN (Note: includes ESPN 2, ESPN 3, ESPN+, and Star+.); Fox (Note: Games are produced and streamed by Fox Deportes through Tubi); Televisa (Note: Includes Canal 5, Nueve, Las Estrellas, Sky Sports, Vix, TUDN and Izzi Telecom.); TV Azteca (Note: includes Azteca Digital); TVC Deportes (Note: includes TVC Deportes 2)

The Mexican Softball League (LMS) (Spanish: Liga Mexicana de Softbol) is a professional softball league in Mexico. The LMS was established in September 2023 and started its first official season in January 2024. The league is affiliated to the Mexican League; all of the participant teams are softball sections of the Mexican League baseball teams. The LMS is the first professional softball league in Mexico and Latin America.

== History ==
The Mexican Softball League (LMS) was announced in September 2023 as a joint effort between the Mexican League and the Mexican Softball Federation as the first professional women's softball league in Mexico. Six teams, all of them softball sections of the Mexican League baseball teams, were confirmed to take part in the league's inaugural season in 2024: Bravos de León, Charros de Jalisco, Diablos Rojos del México, El Águila de Veracruz, Olmecas de Tabasco and Sultanes de Monterrey.

The league held its inaugural draft on 7 December 2023 at the Estadio Alfredo Harp Helú in Mexico City. A total of 120 players were picked by the six LMS teams, amongst them players such as Stefanía Aradillas (who represented Mexico at the 2020 Summer Olympics) and Yuruby Alicart (who was part of the Venezuelan squad at the 2008 Summer Olympics and the 2013 World Games, where she was a silver medalist). Players from Mexico, United States, Cuba, Venezuela and Colombia were part of the league's first professional softballers. In January 2024, New Era was announced as the league's official cap and uniforms supplier for all the six teams.

The inaugural Mexican Softball League season was presented on 22 January 2024 and it opened on 25 January 2024, immediately attracting huge crowds. The match between Sultanes and El Águila at the Estadio de Beisbol Monterrey was attended by 13,408 spectators, while 2,500 people attended the Estadio Domingo Santana for the Bravos–Charros game.

Charros de Jalisco became the first LMS winners, defeating Sultanes de Monterrey in the 2024 Serie de la Reina 3 games to 1. Charros' pitcher Yeraldine Carrión was awarded as the most valuable player of the championship series.

In October 2024, El Águila de Veracruz signed Maxime van Dalen, who became the first Dutch player to play in the league.

On 22 October 2024 two new teams joined the league ahead of the 2025 season, Algodoneros de Unión Laguna and Naranjeros de Hermosillo.

In June 2026, Charros de Jalisco announced the cease of operations of their softball branch, therefore ending Charros' participation in the league. Two months later, the league, together with the board of Leones de Yucatán, announced that the latter would be playing in the now defunct Charros’ place, under the name Leonas de Yucatán (lit. Yucatan Lionesses) for the 2027 season. On 13 October 2026, Naranjeros de Hermosillo announced that it was too withdrawing its softball team from the competition.

== Teams ==
2027 Mexican Softball League teams

Team	City	Stadium	Capacity	Founded
Algodoneros de Unión Laguna	Torreón, Coahuila	Estadio de la Revolución	7,689	2024
Bravos de León	León, Guanajuato	Estadio Domingo Santana TV4	6,500	2023
Diablos Rojos del México	Iztacalco, Mexico City	Estadio Alfredo Harp Helú	20,062	2023
El Águila de Veracruz	Veracruz, Veracruz	Estadio Universitario Beto Ávila	7,319	2023
Guerreros de Oaxaca	Oaxaca City, Oaxaca	Estadio Yu'va	10,500	2026
Leones de Yucatán	(Republic of Yucatán) Mérida, Yucatán	Parque Kukulcán	16,537	2026
Olmecas de Tabasco	Villahermosa, Tabasco	Estadio Centenario Orsan	6,600	2023
Sultanes de Monterrey	Monterrey, Nuevo León	Walmart Park	21,803	2023

== Champions ==
Team	Champions	Runners-up	Winning seasons	Runners-up seasons
Sultanes de Monterrey	1	2	2026	2024, 2025
Diablos Rojos del México	1	1	2025	2026
Charros de Jalisco	1	0	2024	–

== Salaries ==
Players in the LMS have a monthly salary of $18000 Mexican pesos (roughly equivalent to $1055 USD), while elite players (more experienced or foreign players) can earn up to $51000 pesos per month (approximately $2900).

== Media coverage ==
=== Television ===
Fox Sports and ESPN Deportes broadcast the majority of the LMS regular season games as well as the complete championship series.

=== Internet ===
Claro Sports and GameTime, a streaming platform owned by the World Baseball Softball Confederation, stream all the LMS regular season and playoffs games.
