= Bravos de León =

Professional baseball team in the Mexican League

Logo	Cap insignia

Information
- League: Liga Mexicana de Beisbol (Zona Sur)
- Location: León, Guanajuato
- Ballpark: Estadio Domingo Santana TV4
- Founded: 1978; 48 years ago (original); 2017; 9 years ago (modern incarnation)
- Serie del Rey championships: 1 (1990)
- Division championships: 1 (1990)
- Former name: Cachorros de León (1979–1980)
- Colors: Green and gold
- President: Mauricio Martínez Alvizu
- Manager: Miguel Tejada
- Website: www.bravosdeleon.com

The Bravos de León (English: León Braves) are a professional baseball team in the Mexican League based in León, Guanajuato, Mexico.

== History ==
=== Cachorros de León (1979–80) ===
Mexican League baseball in León began in 1979 when the Alijadores de Tampico moved to the city and became the Cachorros de León (León Lion Cubs).

The first manager of the Cachorros was Benjamín "Papelero" Valenzuela. The roster included Héctor Espino, Celerino Sánchez, Puerto Rican second baseman Luis Alcaraz, Ivan Murrell, Cito Gaston, and Héctor Manuel "Conejo" Díaz, among others. They finished last in North Division with a record of 52–82.

The 1980 team was managed by Mario Saldaña. Despite losing star player Héctor Espino, the team improved, but a league-wide strike brought an early end to the season. The Cachorros had a record of 43–53 when the strike started.

=== Lechugueros de León (1982) ===
The 1980 strike was orchestrated by the National Association of Baseball Players (Spanish acronym: ANABE). The leaders and supporters of ANABE were expelled from the Mexican League. They had demanded better pay, better contracts and benefits, retirement insurance, and other concessions that club owners were unwilling to give.

ANABE organized a league of striking players for the 1981 season. León's entry was the Lechugueros de León. This team included Francisco Noriega, Porfirio Salomón, and Vic Davalillo.

=== Bravos de León (1983–91; 2017–present) ===
The ANABE league never achieved stability, so León businessman Pedro Medina Hurtado purchased the Broncos de Reynosa franchise and transferred it to León, becoming the Bravos de León. Their first season in the Mexican League was 1983. This new team included Ivan Murrell, Jesús "Chucho" Sommers, Juan Francisco "Chico" Rodríguez, Henry Cruz, Gener Rivero, Álvaro Soto, Ricardo "Siete Leguas" Sáenz, and was managed by Benjamín Valenzuela. This team went 55–61, good for sixth place in the North Division.

In 1984, Marcelo Juárez became manager, and with the inclusion of players like Alvin Moore, Jack Pierce, Diego Seguí, and Martín Raygoza, the Bravos finished seventh in the North Division with a 53–71 record.

Benjamin Valenzuela returned as manager for the 1985 season, and a pair of young pitchers, Leo Pérez and Roberto Osuna, gave some stability to the pitching. This team surprised some people during the first part of the season with aggressive play and batting power (they hit 161 home runs), but they missed the playoffs with a 60–67 record.

Alvin Moore left the team for the 1986 season, and the Bravos added Jimmie Collins, Francisco "Chino" Márquez, and power hitter Eduardo "Tin Tan" Jiménez. This was the year of Jack Pierce, although the 1986 season was the worst for the Braves both on the field and financially. Pierce hit 54 home runs, which is the Mexican League record for home runs in a season. The Braves finished the season 51–71, in seventh place in the North Division.

The Bravos had their first winning season in 1987. Obed Plascencia took over as manager, and he brought in Eleazar Beltrán and Guadalupe Chávez to reinforce the pitching, Manuel Cazarín as catcher, as well as Ramón Esquer and Roberto Vizcarra. Their record was 65–56. They faced the Diablos Rojos del México in their first-ever playoff appearance, and were swept 4–0. In 1988, the Bravos had their second winning season, 68–63, again with Plascencia as manager. They added pitcher Salvador Colorado. However, they finished in fifth place in the South Division, missing the playoffs.

A major change took place in 1989, with the arrivals of Jaime Orozco, Julio Purata, Willie Aikens, Juan Reyes, Donald Ray Cosey, and manager Francisco "Paquín" Estrada. This team went 73–57, good for second place in the South Division. They lost to the Leones de Yucatán, 4–2, in the first round of the playoffs.

==== 1990: The Bravos' sole championship ====
Estrada continued as manager in 1990. Terry Blocker and Ron Shepard were added to the team, and Juan Reyes and Donald Ray Cosey departed. The regular season record was 74–57. The Bravos qualified for the playoffs for the second consecutive season. In the first round, they faced the Diablos Rojos del México, and avenged the sweep of 1987. They won the South Division championship by defeating the Piratas de Campeche, four games to two.

They faced the Algodoneros de Unión Laguna for the league championship. The Algodoneros' roster included Dave Stocktill, Juan Manuel Palafox, and Cochito Cruz. Purata had a perfect postseason pitching record of 5–0, and Orozco made relief appearances. Aikens was excellent at the plate, and Esquer, Vizcarra, Cazarin, Blocker, Martín Arzate, and Shepard played good defense. The Bravos won the series, four games to one.

==== 1991: Goodbye ====
The 1991 team had a record of 73–45. Aikens left the team, and Luis "Mambo" DeLeón arrived. The team made it to the finals of the South Division, but lost to the Diablos Rojos in seven games.

The season would be the Bravos' last for 26 years. Differences of opinion between the Bravos management and the newly elected government motivated team management to seek new horizons in Minatitlán, Veracruz. Minatitlán offered better facilities at that time than were available in State of Guanajuato. The Bravos relocated and became the Petroleros de Minatitlán.

==== 2017: The return ====
On November 1, 2016, the Assembly of Presidents of the Mexican League, approved the entry of León, Guanajuato, subject to certain conditions, for the 2017 season. The Bravos de León returned to play in the Mexican League in 2017, with Francisco Estrada (who managed the 1990 championship team) serving as manager. However, after a 10-20 start to the season, Estrada was replaced by former MLB pitcher and coach Luis Rivera. The team turned around, going 19-13 after July 4. There was a huge turnover of players, and a major factor was the addition of Major League veterans Dan Johnson and Junior Lake. They finished fifth in the South Division, with a record of 45-60, and won a wild card game at Veracruz to get into the playoffs. They were swept 4-0 by Yucatán in the first playoff round. However, the two home playoff games drew crowds of 6,238 and 6,894.

Eduardo Arredondo led the team in hitting, with a .319 average. Leandro Castro led the team with 19 home runs, and 66 RBI. Walter Silva had a record of 8-9, 3.07 ERA, and 59 strikeouts. Mitch "The Boss" Lively had a record of 7-2, and led the team in ERA (2.41). He and Guillermo Moscoso led the team with 60 strikeouts.

==== 2018 ====
The Mexican League played a split season in 2018. In the Spring season, the Bravos finished fourth in the South Division, with a 27-29 record. They lost to the Leones de Yucatán four games to one in the first playoff round. Julio Perez led the team in hitting with a .395 average, and reliever Oswaldo Martinez had the lowest ERA, 1.35.

In the Autumn season, the Bravos finished fourth again, with a 26-28-1 record. However, they lost a single-game playoff against the Guerreros de Oaxaca, ending their season. Cedric Hunter batted .331, and led the team with 38 RBI. Reliever Tony Amezcua had a record of 5-0, 2.00 ERA.

In November 2018, the League announced that the Bravos would not compete in 2019, and the players would be auctioned off to pay debts owing to the League, other League teams, and suppliers. A month later, the Bravos announced that they had added Grupo Multimedios as a partner, and would compete in 2019 after all.

==== 2019 ====
The Bravos finished next-to-last in the South Division, the result of a disastrous early season. A bright spot, however, was pitcher Yasutomo Kubo. At the age of 38, he led the league with 154 strikeouts.

== Roster ==
Bravos de León roster
Players		Coaches/Other
Pitchers: 52 (Dominican Republic) Deury Carrasco; 9 (Mexico) Faustino Carrera; 45 (Dominican Republic) Carlos Espinal; 76 (Mexico) Jonás Garibay; 38 (Mexico) Felipe González; 65 (United States) Robert Gsellman; 93 (Dominican Republic) Jean Henríquez; 54 (Dominican Republic) Nathanael Heredia; 18 (United States) Jeff Lindgren; 46 (Mexico) Ángel López; 59 (United States) Zac Lowther; 91 (Mexico) Rogelio Martínez; 95 (Mexico) Carlos Morales; 64 (Dominican Republic) Francisco Pérez; 40 (United States) Matthew Tenuta; 71 (Dominican Republic) Phillips Valdéz; 32 (United States) Thaddeus Ward	Catchers: 17 (Mexico) Marco Chicuate; 14 (Colombia) Carlos Martínez; 70 (Mexico) Cristian Mejía; Infielders: 28 (Puerto Rico) Gabriel Cancel; 7 (Mexico) Gilberto Carrera; 39 (Venezuela) Balbino Fuenmayor; 2 (Cuba) Luis Medina; 3 (Venezuela) Jermaine Palacios; 53 (Dominican Republic) Sandber Pimentel; 88 (Mexico) Esteban Quiroz; 51 (Mexico) Ezequiel Rivera; 24 (Mexico) Michael Robles; Outfielders: 82 (Cuba) Dairon Blanco; 6 (Mexico) Roberto Castro; 10 (United States) Alan Garcia; 8 (United States) Gaige Howard; 13 (United States) Jimmy Kerrigan; -- (Cuba) Leonys Martín ∞; 11 (Canada) Connor Panas	Manager: -- (Panama) Miguel Tejada; Coaches: -- (Mexico) Tavo Álvarez (pitching); -- (Cuba) Lázaro Blanco (bullpen); -- (Dominican Republic) Anderson Hernández (third base / infield); 5 (Mexico) Carlos Ornelas (first base); -- (Mexico) Eduardo Ríos (hitting); -- (Venezuela) Russell Vásquez (bench); -- (Dominican Republic) Julian Yan (hitting); 7-day injured list; ~ Development list; # Rehab assignment; ∞ Reserve list; ‡ Restricted list; § Suspended list; † Temporarily inactive list; Roster updated September 24, 2026; Transactions; → More rosters: MiLB • Mexican League
