= 2022 Women's Professional Fastpitch season =

2022 WPF season
- League: Women's Professional Fastpitch
- Sport: Fastpitch softball
- Duration: June 14, 2022 – August 6, 2022
- Teams: 2

Exhibition season

WPF seasons
- 2023

The 2022 WPF season was the first season of operation of the Women's Professional Fastpitch. Two WPF teams competed in an exhibition season:Smash It Sports Vipers and USSSA Pride.

== League Business ==
On April 11, 2022, SmashIt Sports Vipers named Don DeDonatis Sr. their general manager.

On April 20, 2022, the Vipers named Gerry Glasco their head coach.

== WPF draft ==
The 2022 WPF college draft took place on May 20, 2022. The Vipers and Pride each drafted six eligible college players.

^{#}	Denotes player who has not played in the WPF

#	Player	Pos	WPF Team	College	Signed
1	Jocelyn Alo	UT	SmashIt Sports Vipers	Oklahoma	Signed June 13, 2022
2	Georgina Corrick ^{#}	P	USSSA Pride	USF	
3	Mary Iakopo	C/1B	SmashIt Sports Vipers	Texas	Signed June 13, 2022
4	Keely Rochard	P	USSSA Pride	VT	Signed June 9, 2022
5	Gianna Mancha	P	SmashIt Sports Vipers	UCF	Signed June 7, 2022
6	Danielle Watson ^{#}	P	USSSA Pride	FSU	
7	Annie Willis	P	SmashIt Sports Vipers	Mississippi State	Signed June 7, 2022
8	Delanie Wisz	IF	USSSA Pride	UCLA	Signed June 15, 2022
9	Shelbi Sunseri	P	SmashIt Sports Vipers	LSU	Signed June 7, 2022
10	Taylor Ellsworth	C/UT	USSSA Pride	Arkansas	Signed June 8, 2022
11	Melissa Mayeux	UT	SmashIt Sports Vipers	ULL	Signed May 31, 2022
12	Casidy Chaumont	OF	USSSA Pride	Mizzou	Signed June 7, 2022

== Free agency ==
Among signed players returning to the USSSA Pride for 2022 are Hayley Cruse Mitchell, Jessica Warren, Jailyn Ford, Shelby Pendley, Odicci Alexander, and Chelsea Goodacre.

The table below shows the signings of free agent for the 2022 season.

Date	Player	Team
April 5, 2022	Samantha Show	USSSA Pride
April 7, 2022	Amber Fiser	SmashIt Sports Vipers
April 8, 2022	Delaney Spaulding	USSSA Pride
April 8, 2022	Kate Gordon Short	SmashIt Sports Vipers
April 9, 2022	Morgan Howe	SmashIt Sports Vipers
April 10, 2022	Taran Alvelo	SmashIt Sports Vipers
April 11, 2022	Ali Aguilar	USSSA Pride
April 12, 2022	Chelsea Gonzales	SmashIt Sports Vipers
April 13, 2022	Suzy Brookshire	SmashIt Sports Vipers
April 14, 2022	Sami Fagan	USSSA Pride
April 15, 2022	Tatyana Forbes	SmashIt Sports Vipers
April 18, 2022	Abbey Cheek	USSSA Pride
April 21, 2022	Ciara Bryan	SmashIt Sports Vipers
April 24, 2022	Alissa Dalton	SmashIt Sports Vipers
May 10, 2022	Fa Leilua	SmashIt Sports Vipers
May 13, 2022	Ellen Roberts	USSSA Pride
June 1, 2022	Kayla Wedl	USSSA Pride
June 17, 2022	Hope Trautwein	USSSA Pride

== League standings ==
Team	GP	W	L	Pct.	GB	L10	STRK	RS	RA	DIFF
USSSA Pride	29	19	10	.655	-	6-4	L1	144	70	+74
Smash It Sports Vipers	30	17	13	.567	2.5	6-4	W3	144	99	+45

=== Schedule ===
Source: https://www.ballclubz.com/wpf

2022 Exhibition Season
Date	Visitor	Score	Home	Venue	Notes	Ref
June 14	SIS Vipers (1-0)	9-5	USSSA Pride (0-1)	SMSD (Shawnee Mission School District, KS)		
June 16	Alliance	5-7	SIS Vipers (2-0)	SMSD (Shawnee Mission School District, KS)		
June 16	HFL	0-6	USSSA Pride(1-1)	SMSD (Shawnee Mission School District, KS)		
June 17	HFL	4-11	SIS Vipers (3-0)	SMSD (Shawnee Mission School District, KS)		
June 17	Alliance	0-5	USSSA Pride (2-1)	SMSD (Shawnee Mission School District, KS)		
June 22	SIS Vipers (3-1)	1-2	USSSA Pride (3-1)	USSSA Space Coast Stadium - Viera, FL		
June 23	Florida Vibe	8-10	SIS Vipers (4-1)	USSSA Space Coast Stadium - Viera, FL		
June 24	Florida Vibe	6-7	USSSA Pride (4-1)	USSSA Space Coast Stadium - Viera, FL		
June 25	Florida Vibe	3-4	SIS Vipers (5-1)	USSSA Space Coast Stadium - Viera, FL		
June 26	USSSA Pride (4-2)	2-3	SIS Vipers (6-1)	USSSA Space Coast Stadium - Viera, FL		
June 27	SIS Vipers (6-2)	0-1	USSSA Pride (5-2)	USSSA Space Coast Stadium - Viera, FL		
June 28	USSSA Pride' (6-2)	4-0	SIS Vipers (6-3)	USSSA Space Coast Stadium - Viera, FL		
June 29	SIS Vipers (6-4)	2-4	USSSA Pride (7-2)	USSSA Space Coast Stadium - Viera, FL		
June 30	SIS Vipers		USSSA Pride	USSSA Space Coast Stadium - Viera, FL		
July 3	Team Mexico		USSSA Pride	USSSA Space Coast Stadium - Viera, FL		
July 3	Team Mexico 2022	0-17	SIS Vipers (7-4)	USSSA Space Coast Stadium - Viera, FL		
July 3	Team Mexico 2022	0-8	SIS Vipers (8-4)	USSSA Space Coast Stadium - Viera, FL		
July 4	Team Mexico 2022	0-9	SIS Vipers (9-4)	USSSA Space Coast Stadium - Viera, FL		
July 5	Australia	3-10	USSSA Pride (8-2)	Choccolocco Park, Oxford, AL		
July 5	Japan	4-0	USSSA Pride (8-3)	Choccolocco Park, Oxford, AL		
July 6	USSSA Pride (9-3)	8-0	Australia	Choccolocco Park, Oxford, AL		
July 6	USSSA Pride (9-4)	1-2	USA	Choccolocco Park, Oxford, AL		
July 12	SIS Vipers (10-4)	4-1	USSSA Pride (9-5)	Bosse Field Evansville, IN		
July 13	USSSA Pride (10-5)	10-2	SIS Vipers (10-5)	Bosse Field Evansville, IN		
July 14	SIS Vipers (10-6)	0-9	USSSA Pride (11-5)	Bosse Field Evansville, IN		
July 17	USSSA Pride		SIS Vipers	SMSD	Canceled (COVID)	
July 18	SIS Vipers (10-7)	1-4	USSSA Pride (12-5)	SMSD		
July 19	USSSA Pride (12-6)	0-2	SIS Vipers (11-7)	KC Youth Academy		
July 21	SIS Vipers (11-8)	1-3	USSSA Pride (13-6)	Louisville Slugger Sports Complex - Peoria, IL		
July 22	USSSA Pride (14-6)	7-3	SIS Vipers (11-9)	Louisville Slugger Sports Complex - Peoria, IL		
July 23	SIS Vipers (11-10)	0-5	USSSA Pride (15-6)	Louisville Slugger Sports Complex - Peoria, IL		
July 25	USSSA Pride (15-7)	1-4	SIS Vipers (12-10)	Bittinger Stadium West Lafayette, IN		
July 26	SIS Vipers (12-11)	2-3	USSSA Pride (16-7)	Bittinger Stadium West Lafayette, IN		
July 27	USSSA Pride (17-7)	5-1	SIS Vipers (12-12)	Bittinger Stadium West Lafayette, IN		
August 1	CCSL		Florida Vibe	USSSA Space Coast Stadium - Viera, FL		
August 1	SIS Vipers (13-12)	13-4	USSSA Pride (17-8)	USSSA Space Coast Stadium - Viera, FL		
August 2	CCSL	0-6	SIS Vipers (14-12)	USSSA Space Coast Stadium - Viera, FL		
August 3	CCSL	0-22	USSSA Pride (18-8)	USSSA Space Coast Stadium - Viera, FL		
August 3	Florida Vibe	13-4	SIS Vipers (14-13)	USSSA Space Coast Stadium - Viera, FL		
August 4	S & S Sports	0-13	SIS Vipers (15-13)	USSSA Space Coast Stadium - Viera, FL		
August 4	Florida Vibe	1-0	USSSA Pride (18-9)	USSSA Space Coast Stadium - Viera, FL		
August 5	Florida Vibe	2-5	SIS Vipers (16-13)	USSSA Space Coast Stadium - Viera, FL		
August 5	S & S Sports	0-12	USSSA Pride (19-9)	USSSA Space Coast Stadium - Viera, FL		
August 6	S & S Sports	0-8	Florida Vibe	USSSA Space Coast Stadium - Viera, FL		
August 6	SIS Vipers (17-13)	6-3	USSSA Pride (19-10)	USSSA Space Coast Stadium - Viera, FL		

== Statistical leaders ==
Stat	Leader	Team	Total
Batting Average	Ali Aguilar	USSSA Pride	.383
Stolen Bases	Tatyana Forbes	SIS Vipers	12
ERA	Annie Willis	SIS Vipers	2.06
Strikeouts	Keely Rochard	USSSA Pride	45
Home Runs	Abbey Cheek	USSSA Pride	8
