= 2023 Women's Professional Fastpitch season =

2023 WPF season
- League: Women's Professional Fastpitch
- Sport: Fastpitch softball
- Duration: June 15, 2023 – August 13, 2023
- Teams: 4

2023 WPF College Draft
- Top draft pick: Alex Storako
- Picked by: OKC Spark

Regular season
- Season champions: Texas Smoke
- Season MVP: Janae Jefferson

Championship Series and Playoffs
- Champions: Texas Smoke (1st title)
- Runners-up: USSSA Pride
- Finals MVP: Janae Jefferson

WPF seasons
- 2022 2024

The 2023 WPF season was the first season of competition for the Women's Professional Fastpitch. Four WPF teams competed in this season:Smash It Sports Vipers, USSSA Pride, Oklahoma City Spark and Texas Smoke.

== League business ==
Team	City	Stadium	Head coach
Oklahoma City Spark	Oklahoma City, Oklahoma	USA Softball Hall of Fame Stadium	Amber Flores
Smash It Sports Vipers	Oxford, Alabama	Choccolocco Park	Gerry Glasco
Texas Smoke	Austin, Texas	Roberts Family Field Concordia University Texas	Tori Tyson
USSSA Pride	Viera, Florida	USSSA Space Coast Complex	Kelly Kretschman

Women's Pro Fastpitch teams

WPF announced the addition of Oklahoma City Spark as an expansion team for 2023. Seminole State College softball head coach Amber Flores will be their coach. On November 7 the Spark announced their home games would be played at USA Softball Hall of Fame Stadium.

Jocelyn Alo was traded to Oklahoma City Spark by Smash It Sports Vipers in exchange for draft picks and cash considerations. Oh Jan 25, 2023, the Vipers announced their home stadium for the 2023 season will be Choccolocco Park in Oxford, Alabama.

WPF announced the addition of a second expansion team for 2023 in Texas. Former MLB player Brandon Phillips is their owner. The team name was revealed be the Texas Smoke, with their home in Austin, Texas. Professional wrestler Jade Cargill was later announced as co-owner of the Smoke. Howard Bison softball coach Tori Tyson was named the Smoke's head coach. On April 28, 2023, the Smoke announced their 2023 home field will Roberts Family Field at Concordia University Texas.

== Transactions ==
=== Drafts ===
==== 2023 WPF expansion draft ====
WPF held an expansion draft to help stock to rosters of the Smoke and the Spark with certain players from the Pride and Vipers. Following are the picks:

Expansion draft results

#	Team	Player	Previous Team	Date Signed
1	Texas Smoke	Morgan Howe	Smash It Sports Vipers	March 9, 2023
2	Oklahoma City Spark	Keely Rochard	USSSA Pride	
3	Texas Smoke	Samantha Show	USSSA Pride	March 9, 2023
4	Oklahoma City Spark	Fa Leilua	Smash It Sports Vipers	
5	Texas Smoke	Shelbi Sunseri	Smash It Sports Vipers	March 9, 2023
6	Spark waived their pick			
7	Texas Smoke	Ciara Bryan	Smash It Sports Vipers	March 9, 2023
8	Spark waived their pick			

==== 2023 WPF college draft ====
The 2023 WPF college draft took place on April 17, 2023, at the Yale Theatre in Oklahoma City. All four WPF teams participated in a six-round draft, claiming 24 players.

Key

^{#}	Denotes player who has not appeared in a competitive WPF game

Round	Pick	Player	Pos.	WPF team	College	Notes	Date signed
Round 1	1	Alex Storako	P	Spark	Oklahoma		June 13, 2023
Round 1	2	Baylee Klingler	IF	Smoke	Washington		June 11, 2023
Round 1	3	Ashley Rogers	P	Vipers	Tennessee		June 11, 2023
Round 1	4	Megan Faraimo ^{#}	P	Pride	UCLA		
Round 2	5	Rachel Becker ^{#}		Vipers	Oklahoma State	(Note: Smash It Sports Vipers → OKC Spark. Vipers acquired the second-round pick in the 2023 WPF Draft as well as cash considerations with other picks from Spark in exchange for the rights to Jocelyn Alo.)	
Round 2	6	Kathryn Sandercock ^{#}		Smoke	FSU		
Round 2	7	Ally Shipman ^{#}		Vipers	Alabama		
Round 2	8	Kayla Kowalik		Pride	Kentucky		May 31, 2023
Round 3	9	Chenice Delce		Spark	Arkansas		May 29, 2023
Round 3	10	Autumn Pease		Smoke	Minnesota		June 1, 2023
Round 3	11	Kiley Naomi ^{#}		Vipers	Oklahoma State		
Round 3	12	Brooke Yanez ^{#}		Pride	UCLA		
Round 4	13	Haley Lee		Spark	Oklahoma		
Round 4	14	Charla Echols		Smoke	Florida		June 6, 2023
Round 4	15	Makena Smith		Vipers	California		June 7, 2023
Round 4	16	Allee Bunker		Pride	Oregon		June 8, 2023
Round 5	17	Donnie Gobourne		Spark	South Carolina		May 25, 2023
Round 5	18	Mack Leonard ^{#}		Smoke	FSU		
Round 5	19	Karly Heath		Vipers	Louisiana		June 7, 2023
Round 5	20	Caroline Jacobsen ^{#}		Pride	Clemson		
Round 6	21	Yvonne Whaley		Spark	Pitt		May 22, 2023
Round 6	22	Grace Turk ^{#}		Smoke	Oklahoma		
Round 6	23	Montana Fouts ^{#}		Vipers	Alabama		
Round 6	24	Jordyn Rudd		Pride	Northwestern		June 4, 2023

=== Free agency ===
The table below shows the signings of free agents for the 2023 season.

Date	Player	Team
September 16, 2022	Michelle Moultrie	OKC Spark
December 19, 2022	Chelsea Alexander	OKC Spark
December 29, 2022	Chelsea Gonzales	SIS Vipers
December 29, 2022	Taran Alvelo	SIS Vipers
December 29, 2022	Mary Iakopo	SIS Vipers
December 30, 2022	Sydney Sherrill	OKC Spark
January 3, 2023	Lynnsie Elam	OKC Spark
January 18, 2023	Janae Jefferson	Texas Smoke
January 19, 2023	Keilani Ricketts	OKC Spark
February 8, 2023	Sierra Hyland	SIS Vipers
February 18, 2023	Alyssa Rivera	Texas Smoke
February 23, 2023	Jordan Dail	Texas Smoke
February 23, 2023	Shelby Pendley	USSSA Pride
March 9, 2023	Sahvanna Jaquish	Texas Smoke
March 11, 2023	Marta Gasparotto	Texas Smoke
March 13, 2023	AnaMarie Bruni	Texas Smoke
March 17, 2023	Ally Carda	USSSA Pride
May 15, 2023	Delaney Spaulding	USSSA Pride
May 17, 2023	Ellen Roberts	USSSA Pride
May 18, 2023	Rylee Bayless	OKC Spark
May 19, 2023	Ali Aguilar	USSSA Pride
May 23, 2023	Emily Watson	OKC Spark
June 4, 2023	Taylor Roby	USSSA Pride
June 5, 2023	Chloe Malau'ulu	OKC Spark
June 7, 2023	Kelli Godin	USSSA Pride
June 7, 2023	Meghan Schorman	SIS Vipers

=== Trades ===
November 3, 2022	To OKC Spark Jocelyn Alo	To Smash It Sports Vipers Draft picks and cash considerations

=== Retired ===
Date	Player
August 6, 2022	Jordan Taylor
August 6, 2022	Chelsea Goodacre
April 7, 2023	Haley Cruse

== Rosters ==
=== USSSA Pride ===
USSSA Pride roster
Players		Coaches
Pitchers: Ellen Roberts; Ally Carda; Taylor Roby	Catchers: Kayla Kowalik; Jordyn Rudd; Infielders: Shelby Pendley; Delaney Spaulding; Ali Aguilar; 31 Allee Bunker; Outfielders: Kelli Godin	Manager: Kelly Kretschman

=== Smash It Sports Vipers ===
Smash It Sports Vipers roster
Players		Coaches
Pitchers: Taran Alvelo; Sierra Hyland; Meghan Schorman; Karly Heath; Ashley Rogers	Catchers: Mary Iakopo; Makena Smith; Infielders: Chelsea Gonzales; Outfielders	Manager: Gerry Glasco

=== Oklahoma City Spark ===
Oklahoma City Spark roster
Players		Coaches
Pitchers: Keilani Ricketts; Emily Watson; Donnie Gobourne; Chenice Delce; Alex Storako	Catchers: Lynnsie Elam; Infielders: Sydney Sherrill; Yvonne Whaley; Outfielders: Michelle Moultrie; Chelsea Alexander; Rylee Bayless; Chloe Malau'ulu	Manager: Amber Flores

=== Texas Smoke ===
Texas Smoke roster
Players		Coaches
Pitchers: Jordan Dail; Autumn Pease; Samantha Show; Shelbi Sunseri	Catchers: Marta Gasparotto; Infielders: Janae Jefferson; Sahvanna Jaquish; Morgan Howe; Charla Echols; Baylee Klingler; Outfielders: Alyssa Rivera; Ciara Bryan; AnaMarie Bruni	Manager: Tori Tyson; Coaches: Monique White; Cat Tarvin

== League standings ==
Team	GP	W	L	Pct.	RS	RA	DIFF
**Texas Smoke**	36	22	14	.611	177	129	+48
**Oklahoma City Spark**	35	21	14	.600	144	153	-9
**USSSA Pride**	34	18	16	.529	129	118	+11
**Smash It Sports Vipers**	35	9	26	.257	103	153	-50

=== Schedule ===
All stats come from

Legend
	Postponement
**Bold**	Winning team

=== Game log ===
June

Date	Visiting team	Score	Home team	Venue	Win	Loss	Save
6/15/2023	USSSA Pride	2-3	**Texas Smoke**	Austin, TX			
6/15/2023	SIS Vipers		OKC Spark	Edmond, OK			
6/16/2023	USSSA Pride	0-6	**Texas Smoke**	Austin, TX			
6/16/2023	SIS Vipers	1-2	**OKC Spark**	Edmond, OK			
6/17/2023	USSSA Pride	1-4	**Texas Smoke**	Austin, TX			
6/17/2023	SIS Vipers	3-4	**OKC Spark**	Edmond, OK			
6/19/2023	SIS Vipers	3-5	**Texas Smoke**	Austin, TX			
6/19/2023	USSSA Pride	0-7	**OKC Spark**	Edmond, OK			
6/20/2023	SIS Vipers	0-10	**Texas Smoke**	Austin, TX			
6/20/2023	USSSA Pride	3-6	**OKC Spark**	Edmond, OK			
6/21/2023	SIS Vipers		Texas Smoke	Austin, TX			
6/21/2023	USSSA Pride	3-6	**OKC Spark**	Edmond, OK			
6/23/2023	**Texas Smoke**	6-2	SIS Vipers	Oxford, AL			
6/23/2023	OKC Spark		USSSA Pride	Viera, FL			
6/24/2023	Texas Smoke	0-6	**SIS Vipers**	Oxford, AL			
6/24/2023	**OKC Spark**	6-3	USSSA Pride	Viera, FL			
6/25/2023	**Texas Smoke**	6-5	SIS Vipers	Oxford, AL			
6/25/2023	OKC Spark	1-3	**USSSA Pride**	Viera, FL			
6/27/2023	Texas Smoke	3-4 (10 Innings)	**USSSA Pride**	Viera, FL			
6/27/2023	**OKC Spark**	3-0	SIS Vipers	Oxford, AL			
6/28/2023	**Texas Smoke**	2-1 (9 innings)	USSSA Pride	Viera, FL			
6/28/2023	OKC Spark	1-4	**SIS Vipers**	Oxford, AL			
6/29/2023	**Texas Smoke**	12-6 (10 innings)	USSSA Pride	Viera, FL			
6/29/2023	**OKC Spark**	3-2	SIS Vipers	Oxford, AL			

July

Date	Visiting team	Score	Home team	Venue	Win	Loss	Save
7/1/2023	**Texas Smoke**	5-1	OKC Spark	Oklahoma City, OK			
7/1/2023	**USSSA Pride**	8-3	SIS Vipers	Oxford, AL			
7/2/2023	Texas Smoke	4-5	**OKC Spark**	Oklahoma City, OK			
7/2/2023	**USSSA Pride**	6-1	SIS Vipers	Oxford, AL			
7/3/2023	**Texas Smoke**	6-3	OKC Spark	Oklahoma City, OK			
7/3/2023	**USSSA Pride**	8-0 (6 innings)	SIS Vipers	Oxford, AL			
7/10/2023	Texas Smoke	5-6	**USSSA Pride**	Evansville, IN			
7/10/2023	**OKC Spark**	7-4	SIS Vipers	Oxford, AL			
7/11/2023	Texas Smoke	1-2	**USSSA Pride**	Evansville, IN			
7/11/2023	OKC Spark	9-11 (8 innings)	**SIS Vipers**	Oxford, AL			
7/12/2023	Texas Smoke	4-7	**USSSA Pride**	Evansville, IN			
7/12/2023	OKC Spark	0-8 (5 innings)	SIS Vipers	Oxford, AL			
7/14/2023	OKC Spark	2-5	**Texas Smoke**	Austin, TX			
7/15/2023	**OKC Spark**	2-0	Texas Smoke	Austin, TX			
7/16/2023	**OKC Spark**	4-1	Texas Smoke	Austin, TX			
7/16/2023	SIS Vipers	0-2	**USSSA Pride**	Shawnee, KS			
7/17/2023	**SIS Vipers**	4-0	USSSA Pride	Shawnee, KS			
7/18/2023	SIS Vipers	0-1	**USSSA Pride**	Shawnee, KS			
7/20/2023	**SIS Vipers**	7-6	Texas Smoke	Austin, TX			
7/20/2023	SIS Vipers	0-5	**Texas Smoke**	Austin, TX			
7/20/2023	**OKC Spark**	4-2	USSSA Pride	Peoria, IL			
7/21/2023	SIS Vipers	2-6	**Texas Smoke**	Austin, TX			
7/21/2023	OKC Spark	5-6 (10 innings)	USSSA Pride	Peoria, IL			
7/22/2023	SIS Vipers	8-10	**Texas Smoke**	Austin, TX			
7/22/2023	OKC Spark	0-6	**USSSA Pride**	Peoria, IL			
7/24/2023	**USSSA Pride**	11-5	Texas Smoke	Austin, TX			
7/24/2023	SIS Vipers	3-7	**OKC Spark**	Oklahoma City, OK			
7/25/2023	USSSA Pride	1-4	**Texas Smoke**	Austin, TX			
7/25/2023	**SIS Vipers**	6-2	OKC Spark	Oklahoma City, OK			
7/26/2023	SIS Vipers	1-7	**OKC Spark**	Oklahoma City, OK			
7/26/2023	USSSA Pride	1-2 (9 innings)	Texas Smoke	Austin, TX			
7/26/2023	SIS Vipers	1-4	**OKC Spark**	Oklahoma City, OK			
7/28/2023	Texas Smoke	6-5 (8 innings)	SIS Vipers	Oxford, AL			
7/28/2023	USSSA Pride	3-4	**OKC Spark**	Oklahoma City, OK			
7/29/2023	**Texas Smoke**	3-1	SIS Vipers	Oxford, AL			
7/29/2023	**USSSA Pride**	6-4	OKC Spark	Oklahoma City, OK			
7/30/2023	**Texas Smoke**	4-0	SIS Vipers	Oxford, AL			
7/30/2023	**USSSA Pride**	15-4 (5 innings)	OKC Spark	Oklahoma City, OK			

August

Date	Visiting team	Score	Home team	Venue	Win	Loss	Save
8/1/2023	Texas Smoke	5-6	**OKC Spark**	Oklahoma City, OK			
8/1/2023	SIS Vipers	4-5 (9 innings)	USSSA Pride	Viera, FL			
8/2/2023	**Texas Smoke**	8-1	OKC Spark	Oklahoma City, OK			
8/2/2023	SIS Vipers	1-2	**USSSA Pride**	Viera, FL			
8/3/2023	Texas Smoke	8-9	**OKC Spark**	Oklahoma City, OK			
8/3/2023	**SIS Vipers**	6-0	USSSA Pride	Viera, FL			
8/5/2023	OKC Spark	5-10	**Texas Smoke**	Austin, TX			
8/5/2023	USSSA Pride	0-1	**SIS Vipers**	Oxford, AL			
8/6/2023	**OKC Spark**	7-6 (10 innings)	Texas Smoke	Austin, TX			
8/6/2023	**USSSA Pride**	5-0	SIS Vipers	Oxford, AL			
8/7/2023	**OKC Spark**	3-1	Texas Smoke	Austin, TX			
8/7/2023	USSSA Pride		SIS Vipers	Oxford, AL			

== 2023 WPF Playoffs and Championships ==
The 2023 WPF Playoffs and Championships were held at Signature Field at Choccolocco Park in Oxford, Alabama August 9–13. All four teams qualify and were seeded based on the final standings. The first seed played the fourth seed on a best-of-three series, and the second seed played the third seed in another best-of-three series. The winners played each other in a best-of-three series that determined the champion.

WPF Semifinals (Best-of-3)
1	Texas Smoke	2
4	Smash It Sports Vipers	1
2	Oklahoma City Spark	0
3	USSSA Pride	2

WPF Championship (Best-of-3)
1	Texas Smoke	2
3	USSSA Pride	0

2023 WPF Semifinals USSSA Pride defeat Oklahoma City Spark 2–0
Game	Date	Score	Series (USSSA-OKC)
1	August 9	USSSA Pride 1, Oklahoma City Spark 0	1-0
2	August 10	USSSA Pride 2, Oklahoma City Spark 0	2-0

2023 WPF Semifinals Texas Smoke defeat Smash It Sports Vipers 2–1
Game	Date	Score	Series (SIS-TEX)
1	August 10	Smash It Sports Vipers 2, Texas Smoke 0	1–0
2	August 10	Smash It Sports Vipers 4, Texas Smoke 6	1-1
3	August 11	Smash It Sports Vipers 1, Texas Smoke 2	1–2

2023 WPF Championship Series Texas Smoke defeat USSSA Pride 2–0
Game	Date	Score	Series (USSSA-TEX)
1	August 12	USSSA Pride 4, Texas Smoke 5	0–1
2	August 13	USSSA Pride 2, Texas Smoke 14	0–2

2023 WPF Championship Series MVP
Player	Club
Janae Jefferson	Texas Smoke

== Women's Professional Fastpitch Awards Night ==
Award	Player	Team
Player of the Year	Janae Jefferson	Texas Smoke
Pitcher of the Year	Autumn Pease	Texas Smoke
Rookie of the Year	Kayla Kowalik	USSSA Pride
Defensive Player of the Year	Sydney Sherrill	Oklahoma City Spark
Offensive Player of the Year	Morgan Howe	Texas Smoke
Stolen Base Leader	Kayla Kowalik	USSSA Pride
Coaching Staff of the Year	Texas Smoke -- Tori Tyson (HEAD COACH), Monique White (ASSISTANT COACH), Cat Tavin (ASSISTANT COACH)	

2023 All-WPF Team
Position	Name	Team
Infield	Fa Leilua	Oklahoma City Spark
Infield	Janae Jefferson	Texas Smoke
Infield	Ali Aguilar	USSSA Pride
Infield	Charla Echols	Texas Smoke
Infield	Sydney Sherrill	Oklahoma City Spark
Outfield	Michelle Moultrie	Oklahoma City Spark
Outfield	Morgan Howe	Texas Smoke
Outfield	Kayla Kowalik	USSSA Pride
Pitcher	Samantha Show	Texas Smoke
Pitcher	Autumn Pease	Texas Smoke
Pitcher	Ally Carda	USSSA Pride
Pitcher	Hope Trautwein	USSSA Pride
At-Large	Baylee Klingler	Texas Smoke
At-Large	Jocelyn Alo	Oklahoma City Spark
At-Large	Makena Smith	Smash It Sports Vipers
At-Large	SilentRain Espinoza	USSSA Pride
At-Large	Suzy Brookshire	Smash It Sports Vipers
At-Large	Donnie Gobourne	Oklahoma City Spark
At-Large	Haley Lee	Oklahoma City Spark

== Trade Notes ==
Round 1:

Round 2:

Round 3:

Round 4:

Round 5:

Round 4:
