= Fastpitch United =

American women's fastpitch softball league

- Current season, competition or edition: 2025 Fastpitch United season
- Sport: Fastpitch softball
- Founded: 2025
- First season: 2025
- No. of teams: 3
- Country: United States
- Website: www.fastpitchunited.com

Fastpitch United is a professional women's fastpitch softball league in the United States consisting of independent teams in collaboration to create a platform for competition at the highest level. The new league began its promotional campaign in 2024 and launched its first official season in June 2025 and streamed on Pluto TV.

The league is unrelated to the defunct league that used the names National Pro Fastpitch (NPF), Women's Pro Softball League (WPSL) along with Women's Professional Fastpitch, or the Association of Fastpitch Professionals. Not to be confused with a new competing league AUSL

== Teams ==
Overview of Fastpitch United teams
Team	City	Stadium	Joined	Head coach
Kansas City Diamonds	Overland Park, Kansas	Shawnee Mission District Stadium	2025	Billy Butler
New York Rise	Hempstead, New York	Bill Edwards Stadium	2024	Rodney McCray
Florida Vibe	Bradenton, Florida	SCF Softball Complex	2024	Leah Amico

== Championship Series ==
Championship Series history
Season	Champion	Coach	Score	Runner-up	Coach
2024	tbd	tbd	11-4	tbd	tbd

== See also ==
- Women's sports
