= Pinnacle Park (Georgia) =

Baseball stadium in Georgia, US

Coordinates: 32.452348°N 84.991541°W

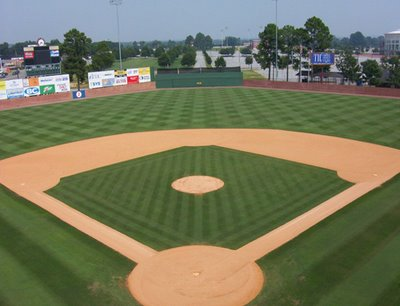

- Location within Georgia Location within the United States
- Interactive map of Pinnacle Park
- Former names: Golden Park (1926–2024); Synovus Park (2025–2026)
- Address: 100 4th Street; Columbus, Georgia 31901
- Owner: City of Columbus
- Operator: City of Columbus
- Capacity: 5,500
- Field size: Left Field: 325 ft (99 m); Center Field: 400 ft (120 m); Right Field: 325 ft (99 m)

Construction
- Opened: 1926
- Renovated: 1951, 1995, 2024

Tenants
- Columbus Foxes/Red Birds/Cardinals (SAL) 1926–1959; Columbus Confederate Yankees (SL) 1964–1966; Columbus White Sox/Astros/Mudcats (SL) 1969–1990; Columbus Indians/RedStixx (SAL) 1991–2002; South Georgia Waves/Columbus Catfish (SAL) 2003–2008; Columbus Wood Bats (GSL) 2009; Columbus Chatt-a-Hoots (SBL) 2021–2023; Chattahoochee Monsters (SBL) 2023; Columbus Clingstones (SL) 2025–present

Pinnacle Park, formerly known as Golden Park and Synovus Park, is a baseball stadium in Columbus, Georgia that originally opened in 1926 and is currently the home field of the Columbus Clingstones of the Southern League, the Atlanta Braves' AA affiliate. While Golden Park officially opened in 1926, baseball has been played near the stadium's current location since 1909.

In 2024, the Mississippi Braves announced that they would be moving to Columbus at the conclusion of the season. With the announcement of the relocation, Columbus Council members voted and approved not only the lease for the team to use Golden Park but approved $50 million for significant renovations in 2024 and early 2025 to prepare for the team's move to Columbus from Trustmark Park in Jackson, Mississippi. In June 2024, the stadium became known as Synovus Park after naming rights were sold to the financial services firm Synovus. The stadium hosted its first Clingstones game on April 15, 2025, and the team defeated the Pensacola Blue Wahoos 3–0 in front of a sellout crowd. Following the merger of Synovus with Pinnacle Financial Partners, Synovus Park will become Pinnacle Park beginning in 2027.

Prior to the major upgrades in 2024 and 2025, the stadium also had significant renovations in 1951 and again in 1995 in preparation for being the first-ever host venue for women's softball in the 1996 Olympic Games. The next year, Golden Park hosted the 1997 Southeastern Conference baseball tournament before the tournament moved to its current location at the Hoover Metropolitan Stadium in suburban Birmingham, Alabama.

The park was damaged in 2006, causing part of the outfield wall to collapse, and then strong winds in 2012 knocked the light stands off the roof, causing more damage. The exterior of the Synovus Park is a red brick façade and has many well-landscaped sidewalks that connect to the Chattahoochee RiverWalk.

Synovus Park was formerly named after Theodore Earnest Golden Sr., co-founder of Goldens' Foundry and Machine Co. Golden led the effort in Columbus for the city's first South Atlantic League team. Synovus Park was renovated in 1994 in anticipation of the softball events of the 1996 Summer Olympics that were held in the city of Columbus. In 2013, Synovus Park was the home of the Beep Baseball World Series Championship game. The Taiwan Homerun Team beat the Austin Blackhawks by a score of 5–2. It also was the home field of the Columbus Catfish from 2003 to 2008.

In June 2021, the park opened back up with the home team being the Columbus Chatt-a-Hoots of the Sunbelt Baseball League. Alternative Baseball held its Playing for Community Integration Tour events starring local community leaders and athletes with disabilities at Synovus Park in 2019 and 2023.

In 1960, the Memphis Chicks of the Southern Association staged a few home games at Golden Park after their long-time home Russwood Park burned.
