= ASUN Conference softball tournament =

American college softball tournament

- Conference softball championship
- Sport: Softball
- Conference: ASUN Conference
- Number of teams: 8
- Format: Double-elimination tournament
- Played: 1986–present
- Last contest: 2026
- Current champion: Stetson
- Most championships: Florida Atlantic (9)

The ASUN Conference softball tournament (sometimes known simply as the ASUN Tournament) is the conference championship tournament in college softball for the ASUN Conference. It is a single-elimination (since 2006) tournament and seeding is based on regular season records. The winner receives the conference's automatic bid to the NCAA Division I softball tournament.

== Format ==
The top eight teams from the regular season compete in the double-elimination tournament.

== Champions ==
=== Year-by-year ===
Year	Champion	Location	MVP	Ref.
1986	Stetson	Atlanta, GA		
1987	Stetson	DeLand, FL		
1988	Stetson	Statesboro, GA		
1989	Georgia State	Lady Rattler Softball Complex • Tallahassee, FL		
1990	Georgia State	Atlanta, GA		
1991	Samford	DeLand, FL		
1992	Georgia State	Macon, GA		
1993	Georgia State	Shreveport, LA		
1994	Georgia State	DeLand, FL	Kaci Clark, Georgia State	
1995	Campbell	Atlanta, GA	Christine Hornak, Campbell	
1996	Jacksonville State	Buies Creek, NC	Ann Shelton, Jacksonville State	
1997	Florida Atlantic	University Field • Jacksonville, AL	Chris Sutcliffe, Florida Atlantic	
1998	Florida Atlantic	FAU Softball Stadium • Boca Raton, FL	Liz Niada, Florida Atlantic	
1999	Florida Atlantic	Lady Trojan Softball Field • Dothan, AL	Nicole Myers, Florida Atlantic	
2000	Florida Atlantic	FAU Softball Stadium • Boca Raton, FL	Nicole Myers, Florida Atlantic	
2001	Florida Atlantic	FAU Softball Stadium • Boca Raton, FL	Nicole Myers, Florida Atlantic	
2002	Florida Atlantic	Troy Softball Complex • Dothan, AL	Nicole Myers, Florida Atlantic	
2003	Florida Atlantic	Troy Softball Complex • Dothan, AL	Jenn Piazza, Florida Atlantic	
2004	Florida Atlantic	FAU Softball Stadium • Boca Raton, FL	Candace Freel, Florida Atlantic	
2005	UCF	FAU Softball Stadium • Boca Raton, FL	Lindsay Enders, UCF	
2006	Florida Atlantic	FAU Softball Stadium • Boca Raton, FL	Andrea Migliori, Stetson	
2007	Stetson	Patricia Wilson Field • DeLand, FL	Nicole Forbes, Stetson	
2008	Campbell	Patricia Wilson Field • DeLand, FL	Brittany Stanley, Campbell	
2009	Campbell	Patricia Wilson Field • DeLand, FL	Brittany Stanley, Campbell	
2010	Lipscomb	Patricia Wilson Field • DeLand, FL	Kellie Sirus, Lipscomb	
2011	Jacksonville	Cyrill Softball Stadium • Spartanburg, SC	Sarah Sigrest, Jacksonville	
2012	Florida Gulf Coast	Cyrill Softball Stadium • Spartanburg, SC	Shelby Morgan, Florida Gulf Coast	
2013	USC Upstate	Draper Diamond • Nashville, TN	Cheyenne Griffin, USC Upstate	
2014	Stetson	Draper Diamond • Nashville, TN	Meredith Owen, Stetson	
2015	USC Upstate	FGCU Softball Complex • Fort Myers, FL	Lexi Shubert, USC Upstate	
2016	USC Upstate	FGCU Softball Complex • Fort Myers, FL	Amy Szymanowski, USC Upstate	
2017	USC Upstate	Draper Diamond • Nashville, TN	Ansley Gilstrap, USC Upstate	
2018	Kennesaw State	Patricia Wilson Field • DeLand, FL	Maddie Roth, Kennesaw State	
2019	Lipscomb	FGCU Softball Complex • Fort Myers, FL	Mandy Jordan, Lipscomb	
2020	Canceled due to the COVID-19 pandemic.			
2021	Liberty	Bailey Park • Kennesaw, GA	Amber Bishop-Riley, Liberty	
2022	Liberty	JU Softball Complex/UNF Softball Complex • Jacksonville, FL	Kara Canetto, Liberty	
2023	Central Arkansas	Patricia Wilson Field • DeLand, FL	Kayla Beaver, Central Arkansas	
2024	Florida Gulf Coast	Choccolocco Park • Oxford, AL	Neely Peterson, Florida Gulf Coast	
2025	North Florida	Choccolocco Park • Oxford, AL	Allison Benning, North Florida	
2026	Stetson	UNF Softball Complex • Jacksonville, FL	Hayley Arnold, Stetson	

=== By school ===
School	Championships	Years
Florida Atlantic	9	1997, 1998, 1999, 2000, 2001, 2002, 2003, 2004, 2006
Stetson	6	1986, 1987, 1988, 2007, 2014, 2026
Georgia State	5	1989, 1990, 1992, 1993, 1994
USC Upstate	4	2013, 2015, 2016, 2017
Campbell	3	1995, 2008, 2009
Florida Gulf Coast	2	2012, 2024
Liberty	2	2021, 2022
Lipscomb	2	2010, 2019
Central Arkansas	1	2023
Jacksonville	1	2011
Jacksonville State	1	1996
Kennesaw State	1	2018
North Florida	1	2025
Samford	1	1991
UCF	1	2005

Italics indicates the school does currently not sponsor softball in the ASUN.
