= Lynnsie Elam-Phillips =

American softball player

Oklahoma City Spark – No. 22
- Catcher
- Born: May 27, 1998 (age 27); Chickasha, Oklahoma, U.S.
- Bats: Right Throws: Right

Teams
- Oklahoma (2018–2022); Florida Vibe (2022); Oklahoma City Spark (2023)

Career highlights and awards
- 2× Women's College World Series champion (2021, 2022)

Lynnsie Sarah Elam-Phillips (born May 27, 1998) is an American softball player for the Oklahoma City Spark of the Women's Professional Fastpitch (WPF) and current assistant coach at University of Science and Arts of Oklahoma. She played college softball at Oklahoma.

== High school career ==
Elam played her high school softball career at Chickasha High School in Chickasha, Oklahoma. She led her team to 4 district championships, 3 regional championships, and 2 OSSAA state championships. During her senior season, she had a .491 batting average, 5 homeruns, and 50 RBIs. She committed to the Sooners as a freshman, and soon after, her mother died which she attributes to her drive for success.

== College career ==
Lynnsie Elam spent her entire college career playing for the University of Oklahoma. While playing in college, she won 4 Big 12 Conference regular season championships, 2 Big 12 Conference tournament championships, and 2 Women's College World Series championships. After the 2021 Big 12 Conference softball tournament, Elam was named to the Big 12 Championship All-Tournament team. Elam was the captain of the 2021 and 2022 Oklahoma teams that won the NCAA championship. Her senior year, she was a finalist for the 2022 senior CLASS award. She was also named Big 12 Player of the Week in February 2020 and March 2022. Elam was not always the starting catcher for the Sooners, but was respected for her work effort and embracing the role of a team player.

== Professional career ==
On June 14, 2022, the Florida Vibe announced that they had signed Elam to a professional contract. On January 3, 2023, the Oklahoma City Spark signed Elam to a contract for the inaugural 2023 season.

== Coaching career ==
On August 24, 2023, Elam-Phillips was named an assistant coach for University of Science and Arts of Oklahoma.
