= Janae Jefferson =

American softball player (born 1999)

Diablos Rojos del México
- Infielder
- Born: February 3, 1999 (age 27); Houston, Texas, U.S.
- Bats: Right Throws: Right

Teams
- Texas (2018–2022); Texas Smoke (2023); Diablos Rojos del México (2026–present)

Career highlights and awards
- Women's Professional Fastpitch Player of the Year (2023); 3× Second Team All-American (2018, 2019, 2022); Third Team All-American (2021); Big 12 All-Freshman team (2018); 4× First team All-Big 12 (2018, 2019, 2021, 2022)
Medals
Women's softball
Representing the United States
World Cup
Silver medal – second place	2024 Castions di Strada	Team
World Games
Gold medal – first place	2022 Birmingham	Team
Gold medal – first place	2025 Chengdu	Team
Pan American Games
Gold medal – first place	2023 Santiago	Team

Janae Reann Jefferson (born February 3, 1999) is an American professional softball player for the Texas Smoke of the Women's Professional Fastpitch and a member of the United States women's national softball team. She played college softball at Texas where she holds several program records.

== High school career ==
Jefferson attended Nimitz High School in Houston, Texas, where she was a three-sport athlete, playing softball, volleyball and basketball. During her first year in 2013, she hit .617 overall with 16 doubles, 11 triples, 16 stolen bases and 27 run batted in (RBI)s. During her second year in 2014, she hit .727, with 74 hits, 18 doubles, 13 triples, four home runs, 21 stolen bases and 37 RBIs. Her .727 batting average and 74 hits where the highest in her school's history. During her junior year in 2015, she hit .687, with 70 hits, 21 doubles, 15 triples, 31 RBIs and 18 steals. During her senior year in 2016, she recorded 14 doubles, 14 triples, six home runs, 21 steals and 48 runs scored. She finished her career as the school's all-time leader in stolen bases.

In basketball, she was named a first-team All-District 18-6A honoree in 2015, and 16-6A Girls All-District Co-Offensive Player of the Year in 2016–17.

== College career ==
Jefferson made her collegiate debut for Texas on February 9, 2018, in a game against UIW. During her first year in 2018, she led the Longhorns in batting average (.392), hits (74), multi-hit games (23), runs (30), total bases (87), on-base percentage (.463) and steals (11). Her 32 hits during the Big 12 conference play were the most by any Longhorns player in program history and the second most by a player in a single-season in conference history. Her 72 hits were the second-most all-time in a single season in program history, trailing only Lindsay Gardner's 83 hits in 2000. Following the season she was named to the first-team All-Big 12 and Big 12 All-Freshman team. She was also named a top-ten finalist for the NFCA National Freshman of the Year and named a second-team NFCA All-American. She became the fourth Texas freshman to earn NFCA All-American honors in program history.

During her second year in 2019, she led the Longhorns in batting average (.408), hits (80), multi-hit games (25), and runs (39), and ranked second in on-base percentage (.438) and stolen bases (10). Her 80 hits were the second-most hits in a single season in program history. Following the season she was named to the first-team All-Big 12 and named a second-team NFCA All-American. She was also named a Softball America first-team All-American.

During the 2020 season, she Started all 27 games while batting .554 overall to rank third in the f NCAA Division I and first in the Big 12 Conference, and ranked tied for fourth in NCAA Division I and led the Big 12 in total hits (41), in a season that was shortened due to the COVID-19 pandemic. Following the season she was named a Softball America second-team All-American.

During her junior year in 2021, she started all 51 games and led the Longhorns in batting average (.446) hits (75), multi-hit games (25), on-base percentage (.495) and steals (14) and second in the league in runs scored (49) and third in total bases (100). She Reached base safely in 47-of-51 games played. On May 9, 2021, in a game against Baylor she recorded her 255th career hit, setting a new Texas program record for career hits, surpassing the previous record held by Brejae Washington. Following the season she was named a unanimous first-team All-Big 12 selection, and named a third-team NFCA All-American.

During her senior year in 2022, she ranked second in the NCAA Division I in hits (92), and fourth in doubles (24). She also ranked second in the Big 12 in batting average (.431), third in runs scored (70), fourth in steals (16) and total bases (131) and fifth in on-base percentage (.502) during the regular season. She led Texas with a career-best 29 multi-hit games. On April 24, 2022, in a game against Oklahoma State, Jefferson recorded her 333rd career hit, breaking the Big 12 Conference recorded for career hits, surpassing the previous record held by Sami Williams of Iowa State. She helped Texas advance to the Women's College World Series for the first time since 2013, where they finished as 2022 Women's College World Series runner-up to champions Oklahoma. Following the season she was named a unanimous first-team All-Big 12 selection, and named a second-team NFCA All-American. She became the second Texas player in history to be selected as a four-time NFCA All-American, following Cat Osterman.

She finished her career at Texas as the program's record holder in batting average (.424), games started (269), runs (222), hits (362) and doubles (55).

== Professional career ==
Jefferson was the drafted fourth overall during the 2022 Athletes Unlimited Softball College Draft and made her professional debut on July 29, 2022.

During the 2023 Women's Professional Fastpitch season in her first season with the Texas Smoke, she hit .438, with a .523 slugging percentage and a .580 on-base percentage, and helped lead the Smoke to the WPF playoffs in the team's first season. She was subsequently named the WPF Player of the Year and named to the All-WPF Team. During the playoffs, she hit .500, with nine hits, six runs scored, a home run and a stolen base. During game one of the championship series she went 4-for-4, with a home run, two singles and a double. She helped the Smoke win the inaugural WPF championship, and was named the Championship Series MVP.

In December 2025, Jefferson signed with the Diablos Rojos del México of the Mexican Softball League ahead of the 2026 season.

== National team career ==
On January 7, 2022, she was named a member of the United States women's national softball team for the 2022 World Games. In the gold medal game against Japan, with the bases loaded and two outs in the bottom of the second inning, Jefferson hit a bases-clearing double to left-center field to give USA a three-run lead, and help USA win a gold medal. She finished the tournament with a .333 batting average (3-for-9) with four runs batted in and three runs scored in five games.

On August 31, 2023, she was named to the U.S. women's national team for the 2023 Pan American Games. Jefferson represented the United States at the 2024 Women's Softball World Cup and won a silver medal. At the 2026 USA Softball International Cup, Jefferson was named Most Valuable Offensive Player of the tournament as the United States won gold.

== Personal life ==
Jefferson was born to Vincent and Catherine Jefferson. She is the cousin of former professional baseball pitcher Mike Jackson.
