= Michelle Moultrie =

American softball player (born 1990)

Oklahoma City Spark – No. 16
- Outfielder
- Born: July 13, 1990 (age 35); Jacksonville, Florida, U.S.

Teams
- Florida (2009–2012); Oklahoma City Spark (2023–present)
Medals
Women's softball
Representing United States
Olympic Games
Silver medal – second place	2020 Tokyo	Team
World Games
Gold medal – first place	2022 Birmingham	Team

Michelle Moultrie (born July 13, 1990) is an American professional softball outfielder for the Oklahoma City Spark of the Women's Professional Fastpitch (WPF). She played college softball at Florida, where she was named SEC Player of the Year in 2012. She has been a member of United States women's national softball team since 2011 and competed at the 2020 Summer Olympics and won a silver medal. She also played in the Athletes Unlimited Softball league.

== Career ==
Moultrie was a walk-on player at Florida, and went on to achieve two Second Team and a First Team All-SEC honors, including being named 2012 SEC Player of the Year. She was named a Third Team and First Team All-American in her final two years.

== Team USA ==
Moultrie represented Team USA at the 2020 Summer Olympics. During the tournament, she had two hits and one RBI. During the gold medal game, she had one of her hits as the USA was defeated by Team Japan 2–0.

== Statistics ==
Florida Gators
YEAR	G	AB	R	H	BA	RBI	HR	3B	2B	TB	SLG	BB	SO	SB	SBA
2009	60	115	22	30	.261	17	2	1	5	43	.374%	2	12	15	20
2010	59	185	47	72	.389	29	4	2	12	100	.540%	17	30	13	17
2011	69	228	75	101	.443	40	6	5	17	146	.640%	34	23	31	34
2012	61	184	60	71	.386	30	10	4	7	116	.630%	28	21	24	28
TOTALS	249	712	204	274	.385	116	22	12	41	405	.569%	81	86	83	99

Team USA
YEAR	G	AB	R	H	BA	RBI	HR	3B	2B	TB	SLG	BB	SO	SB
2020	14	42	11	15	.357	9	0	3	4	25	.595%	3	4	1
2021	28	76	18	19	.250	8	0	1	2	20	.370%	9	6	4
Olympics	6	13	0	2	.154	1	0	0	0	2	.154%	0	6	0
TOTAL	48	131	29	36	.275	18	0	4	6	50	.381%	12	16	5
