= Sara Groenewegen =

Canadian softball pitcher

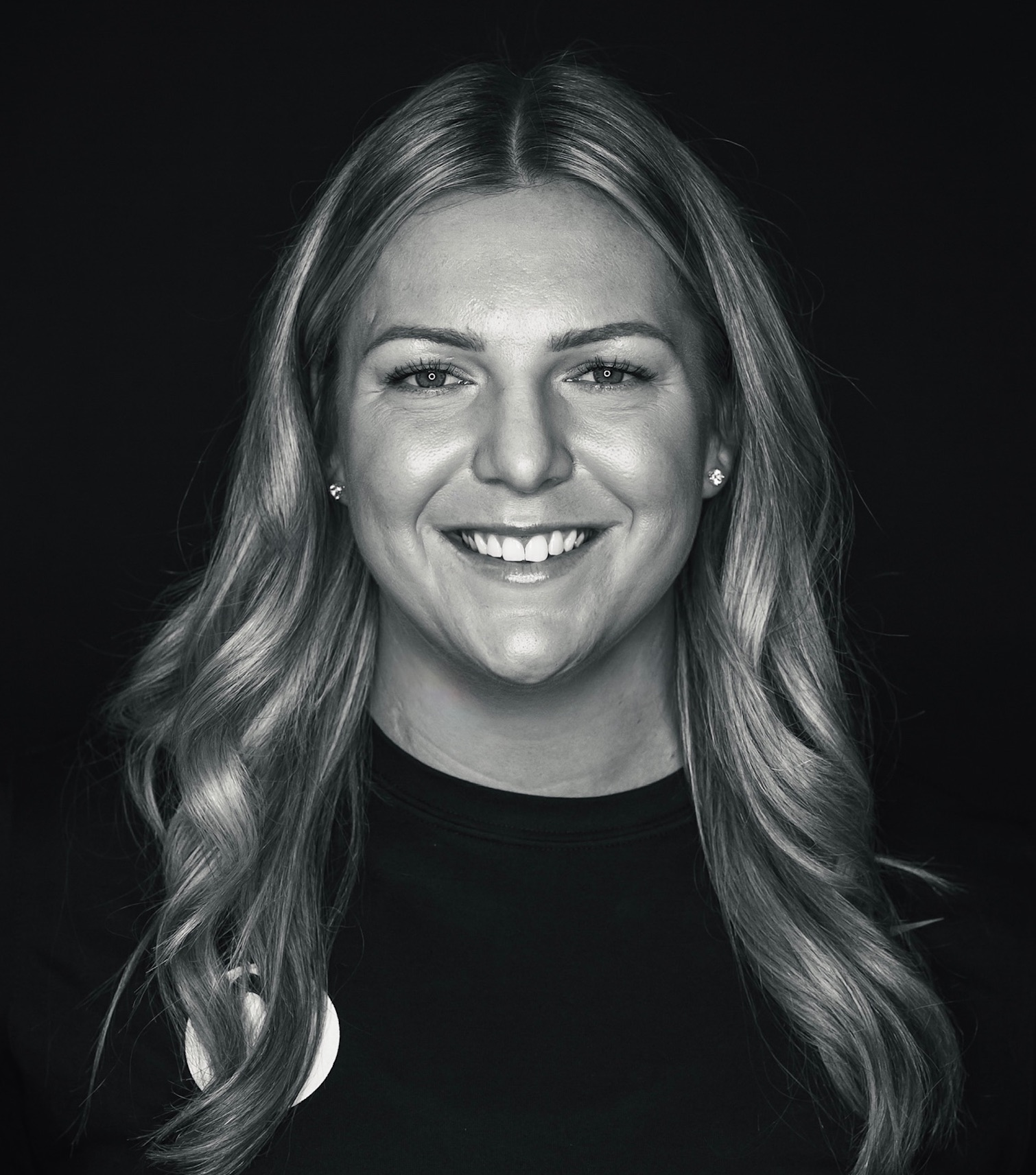
- Groenewegen in 2021

Team Canada – No. 17
- Pitcher
- Born: April 12, 1995 (age 31); White Rock, British Columbia, Canada
- Bats: Right Throws: Right

Teams
- Minnesota Golden Gophers (2014–2017); Canadian National Team (2013–present); Akron Racers (2017); Canadian Wild (2019–2020); Athletes Unlimited Softball (2021–present)

Career highlights and awards
- Big Ten Freshman of the Year (2014); Big Ten Pitcher of the Year (2014); Big Ten Player of the Year (2015); Second-Team All American (2015); First-Team All American (2016); Big Ten Pitcher of the Year (2017); First-Team All American (2017); All-NPF Team (2019); World Cup All-World Team (2024)
Medals
Women's softball
Representing Canada
Olympic Games
Bronze medal – third place	2020 Tokyo	Team
Pan American Games
Gold medal – first place	2015 Toronto	Team
Silver medal – second place	2019 Lima	Team
Bronze medal – third place	2023 Santiago	Team
World Cup
Bronze medal – third place	2016 Surrey, B.C.	Team
Bronze medal – third place	2024 Castions di Strada	Team

Sara Angeline Groenewegen (born April 12, 1995) is a Canadian professional softball pitcher. From 2014 to 2017, Groenewegen pitched for the University of Minnesota, where she hold the all-time strikeouts and strikeout ratio records. She also currently still ranks for both the Big Ten Conference and the NCAA Division I in the ratio category. She played professionally for the Canadian Wild in the NPF since being drafted second overall in 2017. She most recently played for Athletes Unlimited Softball. She has been a member of the Canada women's national softball team since 2013. Groenewegen helped Team Canada win a bronze medal at the 2020 Summer Olympics.

== Early life ==
Groenewegen was born on April 12, 1995, in White Rock, British Columbia, where she attended Elgin Park Secondary school, from where she graduated in 2013. Groenewegen was diagnosed with Type 1 Diabetes at the age of nine, but did not let this disease control her, persisting to become a member of the Canada women's national softball team at the age of 17. She has two sisters and comes from a 'softball family'.

== College career ==
Groenewegen finished her senior season at the University of Minnesota in 2017, where she developed a reputation as one of the most feared pitchers in the entire country, winning Big Ten Pitcher of the Year as a freshman, and repeated her senior year. She also won Big Ten Player of the Year her sophomore season for both her stellar offense and pitching performance throughout the season. Groenewegen has also become a feared hitter, hitting 36 career home runs in her time at Minnesota.

Groenewegen debuted on February 8 defeating the Murray State Racers with 7 strikeouts and six shutout innings; she also drove in a run with a hit. From February 8–23, Groenewgen posted a career best 10 game hit streak: she batted .414 (12/29) and accumulated 9 RBIs, four home runs, three doubles, 5 walks, scoring 5 runs for a .931% slugging percentage and striking out 5 times. Later on April 26, she no hit the Penn State Nittany Lions. In her sophomore campaign, Groenewegen achieved a career high of four hits to help defeat the Stetson Hatters on February 13, hitting two home runs and a double. On March 20, she also tallied two more home runs in a match with the Illinois Fighting Illini, collecting a career best six RBIs. Finally, on May 2 she struck out 19 batters vs. the Purdue Boilermakers in 8 innings for another career best total.

On February 13, the junior tossed 15 strikeouts against the Texas Tech Red Raiders to win the 7–4 game, the strikeouts were her high in regulation. Groenewegen would pitch her first perfect game over the FAU Owls on March 12. In her senior year, Groenewegen whiffed 9 of the California Golden Bears on March 15 to cross 1,000 for her career. She also had two career best streaks: beginning on April 2 to May 13, she won 16 consecutive games. During the streak she threw 98.1 innings, allowing 48 hits, 9 earned runs, 15 walks and fanned 155 batters for a 0.64 ERA and WHIP. In one of the games on April 28, she won her 100th game by no-hitting the Purdue Boilermakers in 5 innings with 12 strikeouts. During the same time on April 14–26, she also pitched 38.0 consecutive scoreless innings with 23 hits, four walks and 59 strikeouts for a 0.71 WHIP. Groenewegen made her last appearance as a Gopher on May 21 in a loss to the Alabama Crimson Tide, going for four innings, allowing a run and totaling 8 strikeouts during the NCAA Regionals.

== Professional career ==
Groenewegen was drafted in the first round of the 2017 NPF Draft by the Akron Racers as the second overall pick. In her second season in the National Pro Fastpitch league, Groenewegen was one of the league's top pitchers, earning All-NPF honors. She ended the 2019 season with a 1.52 ERA going 6–4 with three saves. She made 17 appearances, 11 starts, had 73.2 innings pitched, and struck out 64. She threw four complete games and one shut out. Groenewegen also plays in Athletes Unlimited and was one of the first athletes to sign their contract in 2019. After not competing in 2020 due to COVID, she debuted in the league's second season. She will return in 2022 for the third season.

== International career ==
Groenewegen has been a member of the Canada women's national softball team since 2013, straight out of high school. Groenewegen has played a key role as mainly a pitcher on Team Canada. She led Canada to a gold medal at the 2015 Pan American Games in Toronto, Ontario, which was the first gold medal for Team Canada softball in 32 years. Winning that game also made Sara the youngest starting pitcher to earn a gold medal. At the 2019 Pan American Games in Lima, Peru, Groenewegen became Canada's first pitcher to throw a perfect game on August 5, 2019, versus Venezuela.

Groenewegen started for Team Canada throwing three shutout innings in the bronze medal game, eventually defeating Team Mexico 3–2 on July 27, 2021. She posted a win and had two hits for the team at the Tokyo games.

Groenewegen represented Canada at the 2024 Women's Softball World Cup and won a bronze medal.

== Statistics ==
=== Minnesota Golden Gophers ===
YEAR	W	L	GP	GS	CG	SHO	SV	IP	H	R	ER	BB	SO	ERA	WHIP
2014	14	3	28	17	9	5	3	116.1	70	38	37	42	192	2.23	0.96
2015	31	7	44	39	28	10	2	234.1	141	69	56	78	379	1.67	0.93
2016	31	7	43	39	23	7	2	234.2	169	85	68	55	336	1.64	0.95
2017	31	4	37	30	22	9	1	211.2	107	29	19	30	307	0.63	0.65
TOTALS	107	21	152	125	82	31	8	797.0	487	221	180	205	1214	1.58	0.87

YEAR	G	AB	R	H	BA	RBI	HR	3B	2B	TB	SLG	BB	SO	SB	SBA
2014	55	157	21	47	.299	42	11	1	11	93	.592%	28	24	0	0
2015	60	180	26	67	.372	44	12	1	12	117	.650%	27	18	0	1
2016	55	142	30	42	.296	41	11	0	7	82	.577%	38	21	0	0
2017	61	164	22	40	.244	30	2	0	7	53	.323%	23	22	2	2
TOTALS	231	643	99	196	.305	157	36	2	37	345	.536%	116	85	2	3

Year	W	L	GP	GS	CG	SHO	SV	IP	H	R	ER	BB	SO	ERA
2014	6	1	14	8	1	0	0	38.1	38	21	18	17	39	3.29
2015	1	1	7	2	1	0	1	21.2	13	4	3	6	25	0.97
2016	4	3	12	6	1	1	2	38	36	14	14	8	59	2.58
