= Rodney McCray =

Rodney McCray may refer to:

- Rodney McCray (basketball), basketball player who played in the NBA for several teams
- Rodney McCray (baseball), baseball player best known for crashing through the outfield wall of Civic Stadium in Portland, Oregon
