= Chelsea Gonzales =

American softball player and coach

Biographical details
- Born: June 19, 1995 (age 31); La Habra, California, U.S.

Playing career
- 2014–2017: Arizona State
- 2019: Cleveland Comets
- 2023–present: Smash It Sports Vipers
- Position: Shortstop

Coaching career (HC unless noted)
- 2018: Arizona State (Grad Asst.)
- 2020–present: South Mountain Community College (Asst.)

Chelsea Ann Gonzales (born June 19, 1995) is an American professional softball player of Mexican descent for the Smash It Sports Vipers of the Women's Professional Fastpitch (WPF). She played college softball for Arizona State. She represented Mexico at the 2020 Summer Olympics.

== Early life ==
Gonzales was born to Mark and Cheryl Gonzales. She attended Rosary Academy in Fullerton, California.

== College career ==
Gonzales played college softball Arizona State. During her freshman year in 2014, she batted for a .333 average, with nine doubles, eight home runs, and 45 RBI. During the 2014 NCAA Division I softball tournament, she became the first Sun Devil to homer in three consecutive postseason games. Following the season she was named a top-25 finalist for the NFCA National Freshman of the Year and Pac-12 All-Freshman team. During her sophomore year in 2015, she finished the season ranking fourth on the team with a .518 slugging percentage, and 11 home runs, and fifth with 55 total hits. Following the season she was named to the All Pac-12 Second-team.

During her junior year in 2016, she posted a .339 batting average, .669 slugging percentage, 51 hits, six doubles, 12 home runs, and 47 RBI. Following the season she was again named to the All Pac-12 Second-team. During her senior year she posted a .353 batting average, with 53 hits, 12 doubles, two triples, 13 home runs and 49 RBI. She led the team in batting average, and extra-base hits, and ranked second on the team in hits. Following the season she was named to the All Pac-12 First-team. She finished her career ranked sixth in career-home runs (44), and seventh in RBIs (183) in Arizona State history.

== Professional career ==
Gonzales spent one season playing for the Cleveland Comets during the 2019 season.

== Coaching career ==
Gonzales served as a graduate assistant coach at Arizona State in 2018. She has served as assistant coach for South Mountain Community College softball team since 2020.

== International career ==
Gonzales has been a member of Mexico women's national softball team since 2017. She represented Mexico at the 2019 Pan American Games. She represented Mexico at the 2020 Summer Olympics and placed fourth in the tournament.
