= 2014 NPF Draft =

2014 NPF College Draft

General information
- Sport: softball
- Date: March 31, 2014
- Time: 8:00 PM ET
- Location: Nashville, Tennessee

Overview
- 20 total selections
- League: National Pro Fastpitch
- Teams: 4
- First selection: Dallas Escobedo RHP Arizona State selected by Pennsylvania Rebellion
- Most selections: Pennsylvania Rebellion and Akron Racers, 6 each
- Fewest selections: USSSA Pride, 3

The 2014 NPF Draft is the eleventh annual NPF Draft. It was held March 31, 2014 8:00 PM ET in Nashville, TN at the Ford Theatre at the Country Music Hall of Fame and Museum. The first selection was Arizona State's Dallas Escobedo, picked by the Pennsylvania Rebellion.

== The Draft ==
Position key:
C = catcher; INF = infielder; SS = shortstop; OF = outfielder; UT = Utility infielder; P = pitcher; RHP = right-handed pitcher; LHP = left-handed pitcher
Positions will be listed as combined for those who can play multiple positions.

^{+}	Denotes player who has been selected to at least one All-NPF team

=== Round 1 ===
Pick	Player	Pos.	NPF Team	College
1	Dallas Escobedo^{+}	RHP	Pennsylvania Rebellion	Arizona State
2	Madison Shipman^{+}	INF	USSSA Florida Pride (Note: Akron Racers → USSSA Pride Akron Racers traded their first-round pick to USSSA Florida Pride)	Tennessee
3	Hannah Campbell	LHP	Akron Racers (Note: USSSA Pride → Akron Racers USSSA Pride traded their first-round pick to Akron Racers)	South Alabama
4	Estela Piñon	RHP	Chicago Bandits	Arizona

=== Round 2 ===
Pick	Player	Pos.	NPF Team	College
5	Sara Moulton	RHP	Chicago Bandits	Minnesota
6	Courtney Ceo	INF	USSSA Florida Pride	Oregon
7	Laura Winter	RHP	Akron Racers	Notre Dame
8	Taylor Edwards^{+}	C	Pennsylvania Rebellion	Nebraska

=== Round 3 ===
Pick	Player	Pos.	NPF Team	College
9	Bryana Walker	RHP	Pennsylvania Rebellion	Washington
10	Jennifer Gilbert^{+}	OF	Akron Racers	Ball State
11	Alexa Peterson	OF	USSSA Florida Pride	Oregon
12"	Emily Allard^{+}	OF	Chicago Bandits	Northwestern

=== Round 4 ===
Pick	Player	Pos.	NPF Team	College
13	Cheyenne Coyle	INF	Chicago Bandits	Arizona State
14	Kaitlin Inglesby	RHP	Akron Racers (Note: USSSA Pride → Akron Racers USSSA Pride traded their fourth-round pick to Akron Racers)	Washington
15	Jill Barrett^{+}	INF	Akron Racers	Tulsa
16	Anna Miller	RHP	Pennsylvania Rebellion	USC Upstate

=== Round 5 ===
Pick	Player	Pos.	NPF Team	College
17	Nicole Morgan	C	Pennsylvania Rebellion	Texas A&M
18	Ashley Thomas^{+}	INF	Akron Racers	Georgia Tech
19	Victoria Hayward^{+}	OF	Pennsylvania Rebellion (Note: USSSA Pride → Pennsylvania Rebellion USSSA Pride traded their fifth-round pick to Pennsylvania Rebellion)	Washington
20	R.T. Cantillo	OF	Chicago Bandits	Mississippi
