= Tatyana Forbes =

American softball player (born 1997)

Smash It Sports Vipers – No. 16
- Outfielder
- Born: June 27, 1997 (age 28); Redmond, Washington, U.S.

Teams
- Coastal Carolina (2016–2017); FIU (2018); NC State (2020–2021); Smash It Sports Vipers (2022–present)

Career highlights and awards
- Big South Freshman of the Year (2016); First-team All-Big South (2016); Big South All-Freshman team (2016); First-team All-Sun Belt (2017)

Tatyana Forbes (born June 27, 1997) is an American professional softball player for the Smash It Sports Vipers of the Women's Professional Fastpitch (WPF). She is also a member of Mexico women's national softball team, and competed at the 2020 Summer Olympics.

== College career ==
Forbes began her collegiate career at Coastal Carolina. During her freshman year in 2016, she finished fifth in the country with a .479 batting average, recorded 34 multi-hit games and had at least one hit in 48 games on the season. She broke the conference and school records for hits in a season with 104. Following an outstanding season she was named a top ten finalist for NFCA National Freshman of the Year, Big South Freshman of the Year, First-Team All-Big South, and Big South All-Freshman Team.

During her sophomore year in 2017, she led the Sun Belt Conference with a .406 batting average, and ranked second in the league with 35 stolen bases and fourth with 67 hits. Following the season she was named First-Team All-Sun Belt Conference. She transferred to FIU for her junior year. During her junior year in 2017, she appeared in 38 games, where she posted a .315 batting average with 37 hits and eight RBI, and accumulated 51 total putouts and assists.

On July 18, 2019, Forbes transferred to NC State. During her senior year in 2020, Forbes led the nation with 43 hits, while also ranking fifth in batting average (.538), and eighth in on-base percentage (.593), before the season was cancelled due to the COVID-19 pandemic. During her redshirt senior year in 2021, she led the team with 51 hits, and a team-best 15 multi-hit games. During the 2021 Atlantic Coast Conference softball tournament, she led all batters with three hits during the tournament, while going 2-for-4 at the plate with two RBI in NC State's first round ACC Tournament win against North Carolina. She was subsequently named to the ACC All-Tournament team. She finished her Wolfpack career ranked as NC State's career batting average leader (.423) and career on-base percentage leader (.484).

== Professional career ==
On May 25, 2022, Forbes signed a professional contract with the Smash It Sports Vipers of the Women's Professional Fastpitch league.

== International career ==
Forbes represented Mexico at the 2018 Women's Softball World Championship, starting all eight games in left field. She represented Mexico at the USA Softball International Cup, where she hit .250 and recorded six hits with five runs scored in nine games. She represented Mexico at the 2020 Summer Olympics.

== Personal life ==
Forbes was born to Marie and Robert Forbes and has two brothers, Robert and Bryan. Her father and uncle, Johnny, played professional soccer in Los Angeles. From 2017 to 2024, she was dating former professional baseball player, Eduardo Silva, who is now a firefighter for the City of Pembroke Pines, Florida. Her current relationship status and dating life has since been kept private.
