= Victoria Hayward =

Canadian softball player (born 1992)

Current position
- Title: Head coach
- Team: Nevada
- Conference: Mountain West
- Record: 41–14 (.745)

Biographical details
- Born: 11 April 1992 (age 34); Toronto, Ontario, Canada
- Education: Washington

Playing career
- 2011–2014: Washington
- 2015–2016: Pennsylvania Rebellion
- 2019: Canadian Wild
- 2025: Talons
- Position: Outfielder

Coaching career (HC unless noted)
- 2015: LSU (Graduate asst.)
- 2016–2017: Massachusetts (asst.)
- 2018: Maryland (asst.)
- 2022: San Diego State (asst.)
- 2023: San Diego State (AHC)
- 2024: Washington (asst.)
- 2025–present: Nevada

Head coaching record
- Overall: 41–14 (.745)

Accomplishments and honors

Awards
- AUSL champion (2025); All-NPF Team (2019); Jennie Finch Award (2019)
Medal record
Women's softball
Representing Canada
Olympic Games
| Bronze medal – third place | 2020 Tokyo | Team |
Pan American Games
| Silver medal – second place | 2011 Guadalajara |
| Silver medal – second place | 2019 Lima |
World Championships
| Bronze medal – third place | 2010 Caracas |
| Bronze medal – third place | 2016 Surrey |
| Bronze medal – third place | 2018 Chiba |

Victoria Gran Hayward (born 11 April 1992) is a Canadian former professional softball player and the current head coach for the Nevada Wolf Pack softball team. She played college softball at Washington from 2011 to 2014, professional softball with the National Pro Fastpitch league from 2015 to 2019 and most recently competed for the Talons of the Athletes Unlimited Softball League (AUSL). She has played for the Canadian Senior Women's softball team since June 2009 and was team captain when Canada won the bronze medal at the 2020 Summer Olympics.

== Early life ==
Born in Toronto, Victoria grew up in Mountain View, California and went to Mountain View High School (MVHS). She holds a Bachelor of Arts in Communications and Political Science from the University of Washington and a Master's degree in Business Administration from the University of Massachusetts.

== Playing career ==
=== College ===
She attended the University of Washington from 2011 to 2014 and played outfield for the Washington Huskies softball program. She was a 2014 All-American and a four-time All-Pac-12 selection. With the University of Washington, she won four NCAA Regional Championships and advanced to the 2013 Women's College World Series.

=== Professional ===
Hayward was drafted 19th overall by the Pennsylvania Rebellion in the 2014 NPF Draft. She played professionally for the Rebellion in 2015 and 2016. and joined the Canadian Wild in 2019. In 2020, she was the first athlete to sign with Athletes Unlimited, was named Chairperson of the Players Executive Committee for the first two years of the league's existence and currently competes in the Championship Series.

On January 29, 2025, Hayward was drafted forty-eighth overall by the Talons in the inaugural Athletes Unlimited Softball League draft. On June 11, 2025, Hayward announced she would retire following the 2025 AUSL season. During the 2025 season, she hit .161 with five hits, one double, and five RBI, and helped the Talons win the inaugural AUSL championship.

== National team ==
Hayward has played with the Canadian Women's Senior National Team since 2009 and at 16, was the youngest player to appear for the Canadian national team. She has won five medals competing for Canada - two Silver at the Pan American Games and three Bronze medals at the World Championships. She was named to the 2015 Pan American Games team that won Gold, but was unable to compete due to injury. She represented Canada at the 2020 Summer Olympics, where she recorded six hits to hit .300, including two during the bronze medal game to defeat Team Mexico 3–2.

== Coaching career ==
Upon completion of her college softball playing career, she joined LSU, which finished third at the 2015 Women's College World Series, as a graduate assistant. In 2016 and 2017, she was an assistant coach for the University of Massachusetts helping them to back-to-back winning seasons. In 2018, she was an assistant coach at Maryland and in 2019, joined UCF Knights softball team as Director of Operations.

On August 26, 2021, after competing at the 2021 Tokyo Olympics, Hayward was named an assistant coach for San Diego State. The next season, Hayward was promoted to associate head coach as the Aztecs advanced to the super-regionals of the Woman's College World Series. On June 12, 2023, she was named an assistant coach for Washington.

On May 22, 2024, Hayward was named head coach for Nevada.

== Statistics ==
Athletes Unlimited Softball
| YEAR | G | AB | R | H | BA | RBI | HR | 3B | 2B | TB | SLG | BB | SO | SB |
| 2020 | 15 | 53 | 2 | 21 | .396 | 11 | 2 | 1 | 2 | 31 | .585% | 7 | 5 | 7 |
| 2021 | 15 | 48 | 8 | 17 | .354 | 2 | 0 | 0 | 4 | 21 | .437% | 4 | 4 | 7 |
| TOTAL | 30 | 101 | 10 | 38 | .376 | 13 | 2 | 1 | 6 | 52 | .515% | 11 | 9 | 14 |

== Head coaching record ==
=== College ===
Record table
| Season | Team | Overall | Conference | Standing | Postseason |
|---|---|---|---|---|---|
Nevada Wolf Pack (Mountain West Conference) (2025–Present)
| 2025 | Nevada | 41–14 | 18–4 | 1st | |
| Nevada: | | 41–14 (.745) | 18–4 (.818) | | |
| Total: | | 41–14 (.745) | | | |
National champion Postseason invitational champion Conference regular season champion Conference regular season and conference tournament champion Division regular season champion Division regular season and conference tournament champion Conference tournament champion
