= Jessie Warren =

Oklahoma City Spark
- Third baseman
- Born: December 12, 1995 (age 30); Tampa, Florida, U.S.

Teams
- Florida State (2015–2018); USSSA Pride (2019); Volts (2025); Oklahoma City Spark (2026–present)

Career highlights and awards
- Women's College World Series champion (2018); WCWS Most Outstanding Player (2018); Gold Glove Award (2019); All-NPF Team (2019); 2× NPF Champion (2018, 2019); World Cup All-World Team (2024)
Medals
Women's softball
Representing the United States
World Cup
| Silver medal – second place | 2024 Castions di Strada | Team |
World Games
| Gold medal – first place | 2025 Chengdu | Team |

Jessica Lynn Warren (born December 12, 1995) is an American professional softball player for the Oklahoma City Spark of the Athletes Unlimited Softball League (AUSL). She played college softball for the Florida State Seminoles, winning the 2018 Women's College World Series national title as a senior, and was subsequently named Most Outstanding Player for the series.

Warren is the Atlantic Coast Conference career leader in RBIs, home runs, slugging percentage and total bases, ranking top-10 in all except slugging for the NCAA Division I. She was drafted #7 in the National Pro Fastpitch and went on to play for the USSSA Pride. She played in the inaugural season of Athletes Unlimited Softball league, where she was the runner-up for second most individual points.

== Career ==
Warren attended Braulio Alonso High School in Hillsborough County, Florida. She later attended Florida State University, where she was an All-American college softball player on the Florida State Seminoles softball team. Warren led the Seminoles to the 2018 Women's College World Series title, where she was named the 2018 Women's College World Series Most Outstanding Player.

Warren joined the USSSA Pride of National Pro Fastpitch (NPF), a professional softball league, in 2019. In August 2019, she became the fourth NPF recipient of the Rawlings Gold Glove Award.

On January 29, 2025, Warren was drafted in the fourth round, 13th overall, by the Volts in the inaugural Athletes Unlimited Softball League draft.

== International career ==
Warren represented the United States at the 2024 Women's Softball World Cup and won a silver medal.

== Statistics ==
Florida State Seminoles
| YEAR | G | AB | R | H | BA | RBI | HR | 3B | 2B | TB | SLG | BB | SO | SB | SBA |
| 2015 | 61 | 188 | 53 | 69 | .367 | 57 | 19 | 3 | 11 | 143 | .760% | 28 | 16 | 3 | 4 |
| 2016 | 65 | 187 | 71 | 71 | .379 | 78 | 20 | 0 | 12 | 143 | .764% | 22 | 21 | 9 | 10 |
| 2017 | 64 | 179 | 61 | 74 | .413 | 68 | 23 | 4 | 14 | 165 | .922% | 35 | 16 | 6 | 8 |
| 2018 | 63 | 183 | 44 | 74 | .404 | 70 | 21 | 1 | 14 | 153 | .836% | 36 | 20 | 5 | 7 |
| TOTALS | 253 | 737 | 229 | 288 | .391 | 273 | 83 | 8 | 51 | 604 | .819% | 121 | 73 | 23 | 29 |

Athletes Unlimited Softball
| YEAR | G | AB | R | H | BA | RBI | HR | 3B | 2B | TB | SLG | BB | SO | SB |
| 2020 | 15 | 51 | 5 | 26 | .510 | 15 | 5 | 0 | 4 | 45 | .882% | 6 | 6 | 0 |
