= 2015 Atlantic Sun Conference softball tournament =

American college softball tournament

The 2015 Atlantic Sun Conference softball tournament was held at FGCU Softball Complex on the campus of the Florida Gulf Coast University in Fort Myers, Florida, from May 6 through May 9, 2015. The tournament winner, USC Upstate, defeated Lipscomb in the Championship final 9-1 to earn the Atlantic Sun Conference's automatic bid to the 2015 NCAA Division I softball tournament. All games were streamed online on ESPN3.

== Tournament ==
Upper round 1
4	North Florida	12
5	Jacksonville	1^{(5)}
3	Kennesaw State	3
6	Stetson	4
Lower round 1
3	Kennesaw State	7
5	Jacksonville	1
4	North Florida	4
6	Stetson	5

Upper round 2
1	USC Upstate	13
4	North Florida	1^{(5)}
2	Lipscomb	1
6	Stetson	0
Lower round 2
3	Kennesaw State	4
6	Stetson	7

Upper final
1	USC Upstate	4
2	Lipscomb	0
Lower final
2	Lipscomb	8
6	Stetson	0^{(5)}

Final
1	USC Upstate	9
2	Lipscomb	1^{(6)}

- All times listed are Eastern Daylight Time.
