= Abbey Cheek =

USSSA Pride
- Third baseman
- Born: March 18, 1997 (age 28); Inman, South Carolina, U.S.

Teams
- Kentucky Wildcats (2016–2019); Chicago Bandits (2019–2020); USSSA Pride (2022–present)

Career highlights and awards
- NFCA Player of the Year (2019); SEC Player of the Year (2019); NCAA 1st Team All-American (2019); NPF Rookie of the Year (2019); All-NPF Team (2019)

Abbey Cheek (born March 18, 1997) is an American softball player for the USSSA Florida Pride of the Women's Professional Fastpitch League (WPF) and an Assistant softball coach at Bethune-Cookman University.

== Early life ==
Cheek attended Chapman High School in Inman, South Carolina.

== Playing career ==
=== College ===
Cheek attended the University of Kentucky where she played for the Kentucky Wildcats softball team. She is Kentucky softball's career leader in home runs. Cheek led the Wildcats to four consecutive NCAA Division I softball tournament appearances from 2016 to 2019, including three appearances in the Super Regionals from 2017 to 2019. During her senior season, she ranked second nationally with 64 walks and was third with a .602 on-base percentage and .908 slugging percentage. As the Wildcats’ first-ever SEC Player of the Year, Cheek hit .428 with 13 doubles, 20 long balls, 53 RBI, 54 runs scored and posted an OPS of 1.536. Following the season she was named NFCA National Player of the Year.

=== Professional ===
Cheek was drafted by the Chicago Bandits of National Pro Fastpitch in the third round of the 2019 NPF Draft. During the 2019 season, Cheek was named the NPF Rookie of the Year.
