= 2019 National Pro Fastpitch season =

2019 NPF Season
- League: National Pro Fastpitch
- Sport: softball
- Duration: May 28, 2019 – August 17, 2019
- Teams: 6

2019 NPF Draft
- Top draft pick: Kelly Barnhill P Florida
- Picked by: Chicago Bandits

Regular Season
- Season champions: Chicago Bandits
- Pitcher of the Year: Jolene Henderson; USSSA Pride
- Player of the Year: Amanda Chidester; Chicago Bandits
- Rookie of the Year: Abbey Cheek; Chicago Bandits
- Gold Glove Award: Jessie Warren; USSSA Pride

Cowles Cup
- Champions: USSSA Pride
- Runners-up: Chicago Bandits

NPF seasons
- 2018 ~~2020~~

The 2019 National Pro Fastpitch season was the 16th season of professional softball under the name National Pro Fastpitch (NPF) for the only professional women's softball league in the United States. From 1997 to 2002, NPF operated under the names Women's Pro Fastpitch (WPF) and Women's Pro Softball League (WPSL). Each year, the playoff teams battle for the Cowles Cup.

== Milestones and events ==
On October 30, 2018, National Pro Fastpitch announced the addition of the expansion team Canadian Wild for the 2019 season, which features members of Canada women's national softball team.

== Teams, cities and stadiums ==
Team	City	Stadium	Coaches
Aussie Peppers	North Mankato, Minnesota	Caswell Park	Head coach: Laing Harrow; Assistants: Melanie Roche, Kerrie Porter
Beijing Eagles	Daytona Beach, Florida	Jackie Robinson Ballpark	Head coach: Hunter Veach; Assistants: Kasey Fagan, Cheyenne Coyle, Tang Changdong, Zhang Welhong, Lin Bin, Yang Jie
Canadian Wild	Marion, Illinois	Rent One Park	Head coach: Mark Smith; Assistants: Melissa Basilio, Russell Cooper, Dave Paetkau
Chicago Bandits	Rosemont, Illinois	Parkway Bank Sports Complex	Head coach: Lauren Lappin; Assistant: Amber Flores, Lance McMahon
Cleveland Comets	Avon, Ohio	Sprenger Stadium	Head coach: TBA; Assistants: TBA
USSSA Pride	Viera, Florida	Space Coast Complex	Head coach: Gerry Glasco; Assistants: Kelsi Dunne, Stephanie Ceo

== Player acquisition ==
=== College draft ===
The 2019 NPF College Draft was the 16th annual collegiate draft held on April 15, 2019, in Nashville, Tennessee. Pitcher Kelly Barnhill of Florida was selected first overall by the Chicago Bandits.

== League standings ==
Team	GP	W	L	Pct.	GB
Chicago Bandits	45	38	7	.844	—
USSSA Pride	45	32	13	.711	6
Canadian Wild	42	22	20	.524	16
Cleveland Comets	42	20	22	.476	18
Aussie Peppers	43	12	31	.279	26
Beijing Eagles	45	7	38	.156	31

Updated as of the results of all games through August 11, 2019.

=== Results table ===
2019 NPF Records
Team	Peppers	Eagles	Wild	Bandits	Comets	Pride
Aussie Peppers	—	0–0	0–0	0–0	0–0	0–0
Beijing Eagles	0–0	—	0–0	0–0	0–0	0–0
Canadian Wild	0–0	0–0	—	0–0	0–0	0–0
Chicago Bandits	0–0	0–0	0–0	—	0–0	0–0
Cleveland Comets	0–0	0–0	0–0	0–0	—	0–0
USSSA Pride	0–0	0–0	0–0	0–0	0–0	—

== Game log ==
2019 National Pro Fastpitch Game Log

May/June
Date	Visitor	Home	Venue	Score	Win	Loss	Save	Attendance
May 28	Wild (1–0)	Eagles (0–1)	Jackie Robinson Ballpark; Daytona Beach, FL	4–2	Caira (1–0)	Lan (0–1)	Hovinga (1)	344
May 29	Wild (2–0)	Eagles (0–2)	Jackie Robinson Ballpark; Daytona Beach, FL	6–2	Hovinga (1–0)	Xinxing (0–1)	—	72
May 30	Wild (3–0)	Eagles (0–3)	Jackie Robinson Ballpark; Daytona Beach, FL	7–6	Friesen (1–0)	Wanbing (0–1)	—	
May 30	Wild (4–0)	Eagles (0–4)	Jackie Robinson Ballpark; Daytona Beach, FL	1–0	Caira (2–0)	Fan (0–1)	Rackel (1)	
May 31	Wild (5–0)	Eagles (0–5)	Jackie Robinson Ballpark; Daytona Beach, FL	3–1	Hovinga (2–0)	Lan (0–2)	Groenewegen (1)	242
June 1	Eagles (0–6)	Wild (6–0)	Jackie Robinson Ballpark; Daytona Beach, FL	2–4	Groenewegen (1–0)	Fan (0–2)	—	
June 6	Bandits (1–0)	Comets (0–1)	Parkway Bank Sports Complex; Rosemont, IL	2–0	O'Toole (1–0)	Tarango (0–1)	Carda (1)	275
June 6	Pride (0–1)	Wild (7–0)	Rent One Park; Marion, IL	0–6				
June 7	Pride (0–2)	Wild (8–0)	Rent One Park; Marion, IL	4–5				
June 7	Bandits (2–0)	Comets (0–2)	Parkway Bank Sports Complex; Rosemont, IL	8–0				
June 8	Pride (1–2)	Wild (8–1)	Rent One Park; Marion, IL	6–2				
June 8	Bandits (3–0)	Comets (0–3)	Parkway Bank Sports Complex; Rosemont, IL	9–8				
June 9	Bandits (4–0)	Comets (0–4)	Parkway Bank Sports Complex; Rosemont, IL	6–1				
June 9	Pride (1–3)	Wild (9–1)	Rent One Park; Marion, IL	2–5				
June 9	Bandits (5–0)	Comets (0–5)	Parkway Bank Sports Complex; Rosemont, IL	10–3				
June 9	Eagles (1–6)	Peppers (0–1)	Caswell Park; North Mankato, MN	3–2				
June 10	Pride (2–3)	Wild (9–2)	Rent One Park; Marion, IL	3–1				
June 10	Eagles (1–7)	Peppers (1–1)	Caswell Park; North Mankato, MN	2–3				
June 11	Eagles	Peppers	Caswell Park; North Mankato, MN		Postponed (inclement weather) (Rescheduled as doubleheader on June 12)			
June 12	Eagles (1–8)	Peppers (2–1)	Caswell Park; North Mankato, MN	0–3				
June 12	Eagles (1–9)	Peppers (3–1)	Caswell Park; North Mankato, MN	1–5				
June 12	Wild (10–2)	Comets (0–6)	Sprenger Stadium; Avan, OH	4–1				
June 13	Pride (3–3)	Bandits (5–1)	Parkway Bank Sports Complex; Rosemont, IL	8–0				
June 13	Pride (4–3)	Bandits (5–2)	Parkway Bank Sports Complex; Rosemont, IL	6–1				
June 13	Wild (11–2)	Comets (0–7)	Sprenger Stadium; Avan, OH	1–0				
June 14	Eagles (1–10)	Wild (12–2)	Sprenger Stadium; Avan, OH	0–4				
June 14	Wild (12–3)	Comets (1–7)	Sprenger Stadium; Avan, OH	2–4				
June 15	Eagles	Wild	Sprenger Stadium; Avan, OH	Postponed				
June 15	Eagles	Wild	Sprenger Stadium; Avan, OH	Postponed				
June 16	Eagles (1–11)	Comets (2–7)	Sprenger Stadium; Avan, OH	2–8				
June 16	Wild (13–3)	Comets (2–8)	Sprenger Stadium; Avan, OH	2–1				
June 18	Comets (3–8)	Peppers (3–2)	Space Coast Complex; Viera, FL	2–1				
June 18	Peppers (3–3)	Pride (5–3)	Space Coast Complex; Viera, FL	0–2				
June 20	Comets (3–9)	Eagles (2–11)	Jackie Robinson Ballpark; Daytona Beach, FL	0–1				
June 20	Peppers (3–4)	Pride (6–3)	Space Coast Complex; Viera, FL	1–9				
June 20	Bandits (6–2)	Wild (13–4)	Rent One Park; Marion, IL	8–0				
June 20	Comets (4–9)	Eagles (2–12)	Jackie Robinson Ballpark; Daytona Beach, FL	5–0				
June 20	Peppers (3–5)	Pride (7–3)	Space Coast Complex; Viera, FL	1–8				
June 20	Bandits (6–3)	Wild (14–4)	Rent One Park; Marion, IL	2–8				
June 21	Comets (5–9)	Eagles (2–13)	Jackie Robinson Ballpark; Daytona Beach, FL	6–0				
June 21	Peppers (3–6)	Pride (8–3)	Space Coast Complex; Viera, FL	0–8				
June 22	Comets (6–9)	Eagles (2–14)	Jackie Robinson Ballpark; Daytona Beach, FL	1–0				
June 22	Bandits (7–3)	Wild (14–5)	Rent One Park; Marion, IL	8–4				
June 22	Peppers (3–7)	Pride (9–3)	Space Coast Complex; Viera, FL	0–3				
June 22	Bandits (8–3)	Wild (14–6)	Rent One Park; Marion, IL	5–4				
June 24	Peppers (3–8)	Eagles (3–14)	Jackie Robinson Ballpark; Daytona Beach, FL	0–6				
June 24	Eagles (4–14)	Peppers (3–9)	Jackie Robinson Ballpark; Daytona Beach, FL	12–0				
June 24	Comets (6–10)	Pride (10–3)	Space Coast Complex; Viera, FL	3–4				
June 25	Peppers (3–9)	Eagles (4–14)	Jackie Robinson Ballpark; Daytona Beach, FL	2–3				
June 25	Comets (6–11)	Pride (11–3)	Space Coast Complex; Viera, FL	1–4				
June 26	Peppers (4–9)	Eagles (4–15)	Jackie Robinson Ballpark; Daytona Beach, FL	5–2				
June 26	Peppers (4–10)	Eagles (5–15)	Jackie Robinson Ballpark; Daytona Beach, FL	1–4				
June 26	Comets (6–12)	Pride (12–3)	Space Coast Complex; Viera, FL	2–3				
June 27	Peppers (4–11)	Eagles (6–15)	Jackie Robinson Ballpark; Daytona Beach, FL	2–6				
June 27	Comets (6–13)	Pride (13–3)	Space Coast Complex; Viera, FL	2–4				
June 28	Wild (14–6)	Bandits (9–3)	Parkway Bank Sports Complex; Rosemont, IL	1–3				
June 29	Comets (7–13)	Peppers (4–12)	Caswell Park; North Mankato, MN	3–2				
June 29	Wild (14–7)	Bandits (10–3)	Parkway Bank Sports Complex; Rosemont, IL	1–3				
June 30	Comets (8–13)	Peppers (4–13)	Caswell Park; North Mankato, MN	5–3				
June 30	Comets (9–13)	Peppers (4–14)	Caswell Park; North Mankato, MN	4–1				
June 30	Wild (14–8)	Bandits (11–3)	Parkway Bank Sports Complex; Rosemont, IL	6–7				

July
Date	Visitor	Home	Venue	Score	Win	Loss	Save	Attendance
July 1	Wild (14–8)	Bandits (12–3)	Parkway Bank Sports Complex; Rosemont, IL	3–4				
July 1	Wild (14–9)	Bandits (13–3)	Parkway Bank Sports Complex; Rosemont, IL	2–3				
July 1	Eagles (6–16)	Pride (14–3)	Space Coast Complex; Viera, FL	0–4				
July 2	Eagles (6–17)	Pride (15–3)	Space Coast Complex; Viera, FL	0–10				
July 3	Wild (14–10)	Peppers (5–14)	Caswell Park; North Mankato, MN	5–6				
July 3	Comets (9–14)	Bandits (14–3)	Parkway Bank Sports Complex; Rosemont, IL	1–8				
July 3	Eagles (6–18)	Pride (16–3)	Space Coast Complex; Viera, FL	0–13				
July 4	Wild (15–10)	Peppers (5–15)	Caswell Park; North Mankato, MN	5–2				
July 4	Comets (9–15)	Bandits (15–3)	Parkway Bank Sports Complex; Rosemont, IL	0–4				
July 4	Eagles (6–19)	Pride (17–3)	Space Coast Complex; Viera, FL	0–4				
July 5	Wild	Peppers	Caswell Park; North Mankato, MN	Postponed				
July 5	Comets (9–16)	Bandits (16–3)	Parkway Bank Sports Complex; Rosemont, IL	1–5				
July 6	Wild (16–10)	Peppers (5–16)	Caswell Park; North Mankato, MN	3–1				
July 6	Wild (17–10)	Peppers (5–17)	Caswell Park; North Mankato, MN	4–1				
July 6	Comets (9–17)	Bandits (17–3)	Parkway Bank Sports Complex; Rosemont, IL	1–3				
July 6	Comets (9–18)	Bandits (18–3)	Parkway Bank Sports Complex; Rosemont, IL	2–3				
July 8	Bandits (19–3)	Peppers (5–18)	Caswell Park; North Mankato, MN	6–0				
July 9	Bandits (19–4)	Peppers (6–18)	Caswell Park; North Mankato, MN	1–5				
July 9	Pride (17–4)	Comets (10–16)	Sprenger Stadium; Avan, OH	1–3				
July 10	Bandits (19–5)	Peppers (7–18)	Caswell Park; North Mankato, MN	3–5				
July 10	Bandits (20–5)	Peppers (7–19)	Caswell Park; North Mankato, MN	17–0				
July 10	Pride (18–4)	Comets (10–17)	Sprenger Stadium; Avan, OH	5–1				
July 11	Bandits	Peppers	Caswell Park; North Mankato, MN					
July 11	Pride	Comets	Sprenger Stadium; Avan, OH					
July 12	Pride	Comets	Sprenger Stadium; Avan, OH					
July 13	Peppers	Comets	Sprenger Stadium; Avan, OH					
July 14	Peppers	Comets	Sprenger Stadium; Avan, OH					
July 15	Peppers	Comets	Firestone Stadium; Akron, OH					
July 15	Peppers	Comets	Firestone Stadium; Akron, OH					
July 15	Bandits	Pride	T-Bones Stadium; Kansas City, KS					
July 16	Peppers	Comets	Firestone Stadium; Akron, OH					
July 16	Bandits	Pride	T-Bones Stadium; Kansas City, KS					
July 18	Peppers	Bandits	Parkway Bank Sports Complex; Rosemont, IL					
July 18	Wild	Pride	Space Coast Complex; Viera, FL					
July 19	Eagles	Comets	Firestone Stadium; Akron, OH					
July 19	Peppers	Bandits	Parkway Bank Sports Complex; Rosemont, IL					
July 19	Wild	Pride	Space Coast Complex; Viera, FL					
July 20	Eagles	Comets	Firestone Stadium; Akron, OH					
July 20	Eagles	Comets	Firestone Stadium; Akron, OH					
July 20	Peppers	Bandits	Parkway Bank Sports Complex; Rosemont, IL					
July 20	Wild	Pride	Space Coast Complex; Viera, FL					
July 20	Wild	Pride	Space Coast Complex; Viera, FL					
July 21	Eagles	Comets	Firestone Stadium; Akron, OH					
July 21	Wild	Pride	Space Coast Complex; Viera, FL					
July 23	Peppers	Wild	Rent One Park; Marion, IL					
July 23	Eagles	Pride	Space Coast Complex; Viera, FL					
July 24	Pride	Eagles	Jackie Robinson Ballpark; Daytona Beach, FL					
July 24	Peppers	Wild	Rent One Park; Marion, IL					
July 24	Peppers	Wild	Rent One Park; Marion, IL					
July 25	Peppers	Wild	Rent One Park; Marion, IL					
July 25	Eagles	Pride	Space Coast Complex; Viera, FL					
July 26	Bandits	Eagles	Jackie Robinson Ballpark; Daytona Beach, FL					
July 26	Pride	Eagles	Jackie Robinson Ballpark; Daytona Beach, FL					
July 27	Bandits	Eagles	Halpatiokee Regional Park; Stuart, FL					
July 27	Comets	Wild	Charlotte-West Stadium; Carbondale, IL					
July 28	Bandits	Eagles	Halpatiokee Regional Park; Stuart, FL					
July 28	Comets	Wild	Rent One Park; Marion, IL					
July 28	Comets	Wild	Rent One Park; Marion, IL					
July 29	Bandits	Eagles	Jackie Robinson Ballpark; Daytona Beach, FL					
July 29	Comets	Wild	Rent One Park; Marion, IL					
July 30	Bandits	Eagles	Jackie Robinson Ballpark; Daytona Beach, FL					
July 30	Pride	Eagles	Jackie Robinson Ballpark; Daytona Beach, FL					
July 30	Pride	Eagles	Jackie Robinson Ballpark; Daytona Beach, FL					
July 31	Pride	Eagles	Jackie Robinson Ballpark; Daytona Beach, FL					

August
Date	Visitor	Home	Venue	Score	Win	Loss	Save	Attendance
August 1	Bandits	Pride	Space Coast Complex; Viera, FL					
August 2	Bandits	Pride	Space Coast Complex; Viera, FL					
August 3	Bandits	Pride	Space Coast Complex; Viera, FL					
August 5	Pride	Peppers	Caswell Park; North Mankato, MN					
August 5	Eagles	Bandits	Parkway Bank Sports Complex; Rosemont, IL					
August 6	Pride	Peppers	Caswell Park; North Mankato, MN					
August 6	Pride	Peppers	Caswell Park; North Mankato, MN					
August 6	Eagles	Bandits	Parkway Bank Sports Complex; Rosemont, IL					
August 6	Eagles	Bandits	Parkway Bank Sports Complex; Rosemont, IL					
August 7	Pride	Peppers	Caswell Park; North Mankato, MN					
August 7	Eagles	Bandits	Parkway Bank Sports Complex; Rosemont, IL					
August 10	Pride	Bandits	Parkway Bank Sports Complex; Rosemont, IL					
August 11	Pride	Bandits	Parkway Bank Sports Complex; Rosemont, IL					

NPF Championship
Date	Visitor	Home	Venue	Score	Win	Loss	Save	Attendance	Series
August 15	Pride	Bandits	Parkway Bank Sports Complex; Rosemont, IL	3–0					1–0
August 16	Bandits	Pride	Parkway Bank Sports Complex; Rosemont, IL	4–5					2–0
August 17	Pride	Bandits	Parkway Bank Sports Complex; Rosemont, IL	8–2					3–0

- Winning team Postponement

== Players of the Week ==
Week		Player of the Week		Pitcher of the Week		Rookie of the Week		Ref.
Week		Player	Team	Player	Team	Player	Team	Ref.
1	May 27–June 2	Victoria Hayward	Canadian Wild	Jenna Caira	Canadian Wild	Morgan Rackel	Canadian Wild	
2	June 3–June 9	Kristyn Sandberg	Chicago Bandits	Danielle O'Toole	Chicago Bandits	Holly Speers	Canadian Wild	
3	June 10–June 16	Jennifer Gilbert	Canadian Wild	Jenna Caira	Canadian Wild	Amanda Lorenz	USSSA Pride	
4	June 17–June 23	Bianka Bell	USSSA Pride	Sierra Hyland	Cleveland Comets	Abbey Cheek	Chicago Bandits	
5	June 24–June 30	Chelsea Goodacre	USSSA Pride	Angel Bunner	Beijing Eagles	Abbey Cheek	Chicago Bandits	
6	July 1–July 7	Jennifer Gilbert	Canadian Wild	Jolene Henderson	USSSA Pride	Holly Speers	Canadian Wild	
7	July 8–July 14	Amanda Chidester	Chicago Bandits	Kaia Parnaby	Aussie Peppers	Abbey Cheek	Chicago Bandits	
8	July 15–July 21	Victoria Vidales	Cleveland Comets	Rachele Fico	Chicago Bandits	Lilli Piper	Cleveland Comets	
9	July 22–July 28	Sydney Romero	USSSA Pride	Jolene Henderson	USSSA Pride	Jenna Caira	Canadian Wild	
10	July 29–August 4	Amanda Chidester	Chicago Bandits	Rachele Fico	Chicago Bandits	Abbey Cheek	Chicago Bandits	
11	August 4–August 11	Abbey Cheek	Chicago Bandits	Kaia Parnaby	Aussie Peppers	Sydney Romero	USSSA Pride	

== NPF Championship ==
NPF Semifinals
1
4
2
3

NPF Championship

2019 NPF Semifinals
Game	Date	Score	Winning Pitcher	Save	Losing Pitcher	Player of the Game	Series

2019 NPF Semifinals
Game	Date	Score	Winning Pitcher	Save	Losing Pitcher	Player of the Game	Series

2019 NPF Championship Series
Game	Date	Score	Winning Pitcher	Save	Losing Pitcher	Player of the Game	Series

=== Championship Game ===
Team	Top Batter	Stats.
USSSA Pride	Shay Knighten	2-3 3RBIs 2B
Chicago Bandits	Abbey Cheek	3-4 RBI HR

Team	Pitcher	IP	H	R	ER	BB	SO
USSSA Pride	Taran Alvelo	1.1	4	2	2	0	1
USSSA Pride	Jolene Henderson (W)	2.0	5	0	0	0	1
USSSA Pride	Jailyn Ford (SV)	3.0	2	0	0	0	5
Chicago Bandits	Rachele Fico (L)	0.2	3	3	3	0	0
Chicago Bandits	Aleshia Ocasio	1.2	2	1	1	0	1
Chicago Bandits	Danielle O'Toole	1.2	2	1	1	1	1
Chicago Bandits	Ally Carda	2.1	4	3	3	0	3
Chicago Bandits	Haylie Wagner	0.2	0	0	0	0	2

2019 NPF Championship Series MVP
Player	Club	Stats.
Jailyn Ford	USSSA Pride	1-0 15Ks 0.00 ERA 2SVs 0.50 WHIP (3Hs+BB/8.0 IP)

== Annual awards ==
Award	Player	Team
Player of the Year	Amanda Chidester	Chicago Bandits
Pitcher of the Year	Jolene Henderson	USSSA Pride
Gold Glove Presented by Rawlings	Jessie Warren	USSSA Pride
Offensive Player of the Year	Amanda Chidester	Chicago Bandits
Rookie of the Year	Abbey Cheek	Chicago Bandits
Legacy Award	Kelly Kretschman	USSSA Pride
Stolen Bases Award	Sammy Marshall	Cleveland Comets
Home Run Award	Amanda Chidester	Chicago Bandits
Jennie Finch Award	Victoria Hayward	Canadian Wild
Coaching Staff of the Year	Lauren Lappin; Amber Flores; Lance McMahon	Chicago Bandits
Umpire of the Year	Scott Mair	

== All-NPF Team ==
2019 All-NPF Team
Position	Name	Team
Catcher	Chelsea Goodacre	USSSA Pride
First base	Amanda Chidester	Chicago Bandits
Second base	Abby Ramirez	Chicago Bandits
Third base	Jessie Warren	USSSA Pride
Shortstop	Hannah Flippen	Chicago Bandits
Outfield	Allexis Bennett	USSSA Pride
Outfield	Victoria Hayward	Canadian Wild
Outfield	Brenna Moss	Chicago Bandits
Designated player	Kelly Kretschman	USSSA Pride
At Large	Sydney Romero	USSSA Pride
At Large	Rachele Fico	Chicago Bandits
At Large	Jennifer Gilbert	Canadian Wild
At Large	Abbey Cheek	Chicago Bandits
At Large	Gwen Svekis	Chicago Bandits
Pitcher	Jolene Henderson	USSSA Pride
Pitcher	Sara Groenewegen	Canadian Wild
Pitcher	Aleshia Ocasio	Chicago Bandits
Pitcher	Taran Alvelo	USSSA Pride
