= Sunbelt Baseball League =

Collegiate summer baseball league in the southern US

- Sport: Baseball
- Founded: 2005
- President: Bobby Bennett
- General manager: Becky Kelly
- Administrator: Jake Grier
- Motto: Georgia's Premier Collegiate Summer Baseball League
- No. of teams: 8
- Country: United States
- Headquarters: Lawrenceville, Georgia
- Most recent champion: Atlanta Crackers (2025)
- Most titles: Atlanta Crackers (5)
- Sponsors: Major League Baseball, Rawlings, Peach State Roofing, Kapp Koncepts, Ignite Business Solutions, CorTech, Wilson Action Photography and Atlanta Rehabilitation & Performance Center
- Website: www.sunbeltleague.com

The Sunbelt Baseball League (SBL) is a non-profit collegiate summer baseball league with teams located in metropolitan Atlanta, Georgia and Oxford, Alabama. The SBL is a member of the National Alliance of College Summer Baseball, which is partially funded by Major League Baseball. Games are played with wooden bats. The season starts in early June and runs through the end of July/early August, with playoffs determining the league champion.

== Current league teams ==
Team	Manager	Location	Home field	Established
Alpharetta Aviators	Brandon Boggs	Alpharetta, GA	Veterans Field (American Legion Post 201)	2010
Atlanta Astros	Pat Walker	Panthersville, GA	Georgia State Baseball Complex	2025
Atlanta Crackers	Kevin Meistickle	Buford, GA	Seckinger High School	2009 (1983)
Brookhaven Bucks	Joel Crisler	Brookhaven, GA	Hermance Stadium at Oglethorpe University	2011
Cartersville Cannons	James Williams	Cartersville, GA	Georgia Highlands College (Cartersville campus)	2024
Choccolocco Monsters	Ryan Sadler	Oxford, AL	Choccolocco Park	2022
Gainesville Gol’Diggers	Kraig Hawkins	Gainesville, GA	Multiple fields	2009
Lake Oconee Wild Things	Logan Hicks	Greensboro, GA	Lake Oconee Academy	2021

== Past champions and runners-up ==
Year	Champion	Runner-up
2026	Brookhaven Bucks	Lake Oconee Wild Things
2025	Atlanta Crackers	Cartersville Cannons
2024	Choccolocco Monsters	Atlanta Crackers
2023	Gainesville Gol'Diggers	Columbus Chatt-a-Hoots
2022	Gainesville Gol'Diggers	Atlanta Crackers
2021	Alpharetta Aviators	Columbus Chatt-a-Hoots
2019	Brookhaven Bucks	Norcross Astros
2018	Brookhaven Bucks	Marietta Patriots
2017	Sunbelt Patriots	Atlanta Crackers
2016	Atlanta Crackers	Carrollton Clippers
2015	Atlanta Crackers	Phenix City Crawdads
2014	Atlanta Crackers	Phenix City Crawdads
2013	Atlanta Crackers	6-4-3 DP Cougars
2012	Douglasville Bulls	Windward Braves
2011	Berkeley Lake Tides	Douglasville Bulls
2010	Berkeley Lake Tides	Douglasville Bulls
2009	Rockdale A's	Atlanta Crackers
2008		
2007		
2006	Rockdale A's	
2005	Atlanta Astros	

== Former league teams ==
- Atlanta Blues (2022–24)
- Waleska Wild Things (2021–24) became Lake Oconee Wild Things
- Chattahoochee Monsters (2023) returned to Choccolocco Monsters
- Columbus Chatt-A-Hoots (2021–2023)
- Choccolocco (Oxford, AL) Monsters (2022) became Chattahoochee (Columbus, GA) Monsters
- Gwinnett Astros (2020–2022)
- Gainesville Braves (2020–2021) became G'ville Gol'Diggers
- Marietta Patriots (2018–2021) became Atlanta Blues
- Gwinnett Tides (2014–2019) became Gainesville Braves
- Norcross Astros (2016–2019) became Gwinnett Astros
- Phenix City Crawdads (2014–2017)
- Carrollton Clippers (2016–2017)
- Alpharetta Braves (2015–2017) became Alpharetta Aviators
- Sunbelt Patriots (2017) became Marietta Patriots
- Marietta Patriots (2016) became Sunbelt Patriots
- Douglasville Bulls (2009–2015) became Carrollton Clippers
- East Cobb Patriots (2014–2015) became Marietta Patriots
- Home Plate Chukars (2010–2014) became Peachtree City Chukars (2015)
- Windward Braves (2010–2014) became Alpharetta Braves
- Berkeley Lake Tides (2009–2013) became Gwinnett Tides
- 6-4-3 DP Cougars (2011–2013)
- OTC Bearcats (2012–2013)
- Rockdale Roadrunners (2011)
- South Atlanta Bearcats (2011)
- Rockdale A's (2005–2010)
- Signature Park Grizzlies (2010)
- South Atlanta Phillies (2010)
- Atlanta Astros (2005–2010)
- Fulton Grizzlies (2009)
- Alpharetta Phillies (2009)
- Johns Creek Wood Ducks (2005–2009)

== Sunbelt Baseball League alumni in Major League Baseball ==
Player	MLB team(s)	MLB debut	SBL team (year)
Chandler Simpson	Tampa Bay Rays	April 19, 2025	Brookhaven Bucks (2019)
Kyle McCann	Oakland Athletics	September 29, 2024	Norcross Astros (2017)
Graham Pauley	San Diego Padres, Miami Marlins	March 20, 2024	Alpharetta Aviators (2021)
Xzavion Curry	Cleveland Guardians, Miami Marlins, New York Mets	August 15, 2022	Brookhaven Bucks (2017)
Seth Beer	Arizona Diamondbacks	September 10, 2021	Norcross Astros (2017)
Sean Guenther	Miami Marlins, Detroit Tigers	August 4, 2021	Brookhaven Bucks (2014)
Nate Lowe	Tampa Bay Rays, Texas Rangers, Washington Nationals, Boston Red Sox, Cincinnati Reds	April 29, 2019	East Cobb Patriots (2014)
Touki Toussaint	Atlanta Braves, Los Angeles Angels, Cleveland Guardians, Chicago White Sox	August 13, 2018	Brookhaven Bucks (2014)
Alan Busenitz	Minnesota Twins, Cincinnati Reds	June 17, 2017	Berkeley Lake Tides (2011)
Drew Steckenrider	Miami Marlins, Seattle Mariners	May 24, 2017	Windward Braves (2010)
Tyler Austin	New York Yankees, Minnesota Twins, San Francisco Giants, Milwaukee Brewers	August 13, 2016	Rockdale A's (2010)
Buck Farmer	Detroit Tigers, Cincinnati Reds	August 13, 2014	Rockdale A's (2009)
David Hale	Atlanta Braves, Colorado Rockies, New York Yankees	September 13, 2013	
Tyler Flowers	Chicago White Sox, Atlanta Braves	September 3, 2009	Rockdale A's (2005)
