= Goldens' Foundry =

Coordinates: 32.46835°N 84.984376°W

Goldens' Foundry and Machine Co.
- Company type: Private
- Founded: Columbus, Georgia, USA (1882)
- Headquarters: Columbus, Georgia, USA
- Key people: George Golden Boyd, Sr., Chairman and CEO; George Golden Boyd, Jr., Vice President and General Counsel
- Website: www.gfmco.com

Goldens' Foundry and Machine Co. is a privately held ductile iron and gray iron foundry with headquarters in Columbus, Georgia and additional facilities in Cordele, Georgia in the United States. It has operated continuously since 1882. Goldens' provides castings to a variety of industries, including agricultural, construction, power transmission, defense, and large vehicles.

== Operations ==
Goldens' Foundry began operations in Columbus, Georgia in 1882 as Goldens' Brothers, founded by 32-year-old Theodore Earnest "Theo" Golden and 24-year-old John Poitevent "Porter" Golden. At the beginning of 1889, Goldens' Brothers was incorporated, with the financial support of Abraham Illges, and renamed Goldens' Foundry and Machine Company.

Goldens' is still owned and operated by descendants of the original three founders. George Golden Boyd Sr., president and CEO, and George Golden Boyd Jr., vice president of sales, continue to lead the family-run company to this day.

The foundry went through numerous upgrades, growing into a 150,000 sq ft (14,000 m^{2}) facility. With integrated core, molding, cleaning, and machining, and finishing facilities under one roof, Goldens' is able to provide a single-source resource to casting consumers.

Goldens' employs more than 200 skilled workers at their Columbus location, and approximately 100 at their operation in Cordele.

Quality Assurance

Goldens' utilizes numerous techniques to ensure quality is maintained at both facilities. The company is ISO 9001-2015 certified by Lloyd's. Lean manufacturing principles are also in place throughout the facility, and 5S standards are in place in each department.

== Columbus casting facilities ==
Tight flask cope and drag molding line

In Columbus, Casting operations in Goldens’ are supported by four Brown-Boveri coreless induction furnaces, coupled with 1200°F (650°C) preheating, and a comprehensive core shop employing isocure, shell and no-bake (air set). Steel and quality scrap are purchased from a variety of sources.

=== Large casting facility ===
Goldens’ Large Casting Facility utilizes a Heinrich Wagner Sinto automated molding machine. Using this (48x48 18/18) high pressure machine, ductile iron and gray iron casting capability includes the cost efficient manufacture of large castings. The Sinto incorporates the Seiatsu blow squeeze process, and provides opportunity to produce short run and high-volume orders.

The goal with a tight-flask machine such as this is to create near net-shape castings, reducing the need for machining and other processing operations.

Charging a Ductile Iron Ladle

=== Centrifugal castings ===
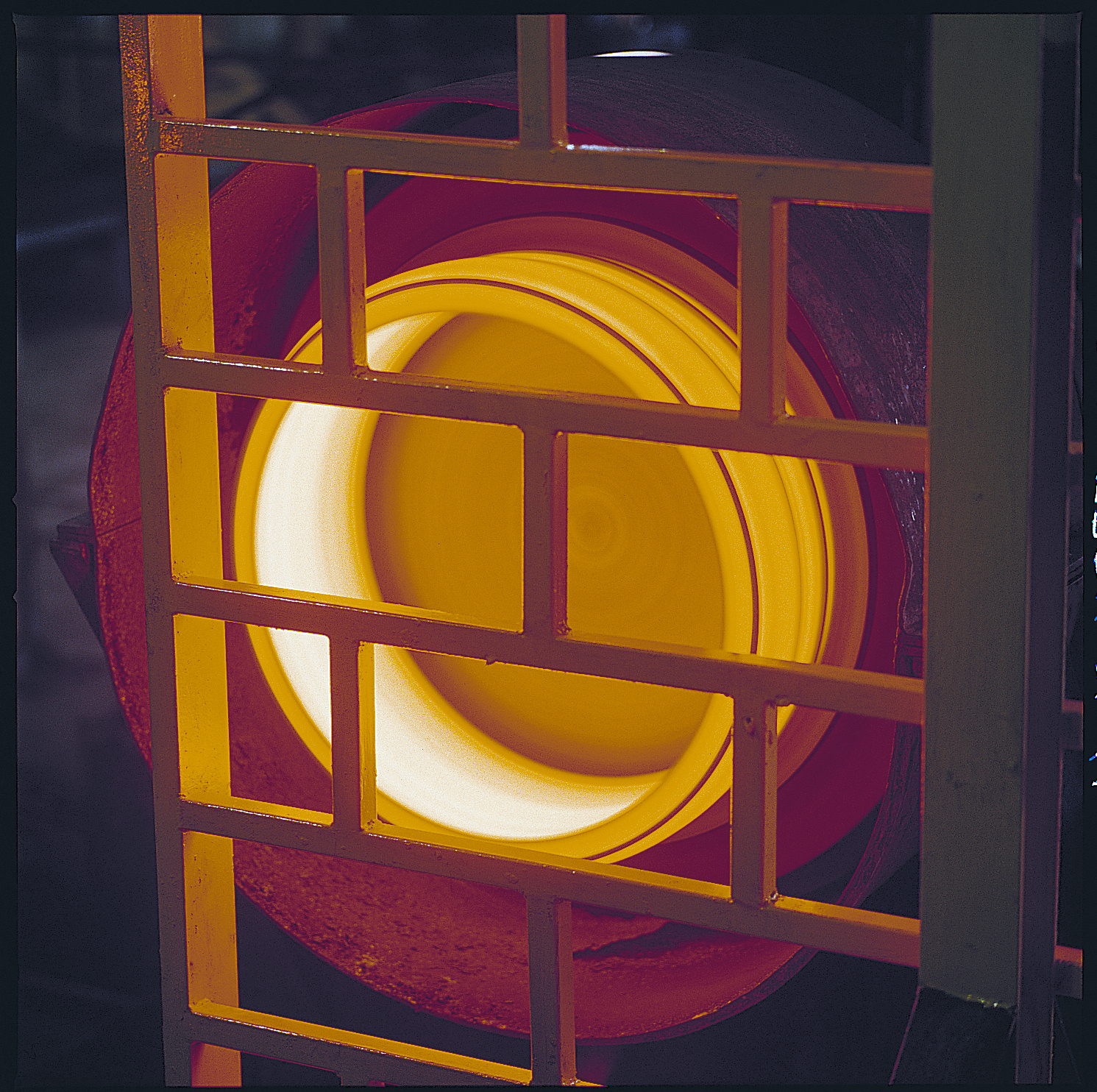
Centrifugal Casting cools and hardens as it spins

Goldens' utilizes a specific centrifugal cast operation for adding iron liners to steel drums. In Goldens’ centrifugal casting process, molten iron is poured into a hollow cylindrical mold spinning on a horizontal or vertical axis at speeds generating 40 to 70 Gs of centrifugal force. This force distributes the molten metal, promotes directional solidification, and improves casting integrity by forcing impurities to the inside surface.

Centrifugal casting at Goldens' is designed for specific product applications, as opposed to other foundries strictly devoted to the centrifugal process, such as steel pipe foundries. The centrifugal casting process was added in the late 1990s as a complement to the green sand mold processes already in place.

=== No bake molding ===
Goldens' added a fourth molding line, a no-bake sand operation in 2000. The manual molding operation allows production of much larger castings than the Sinto cope and drag machine, and is primarily utilized for Goldens' power transmission operations. This consists primarily of sheaves, pulleys, and sprockets.

== Cordele casting facilities ==
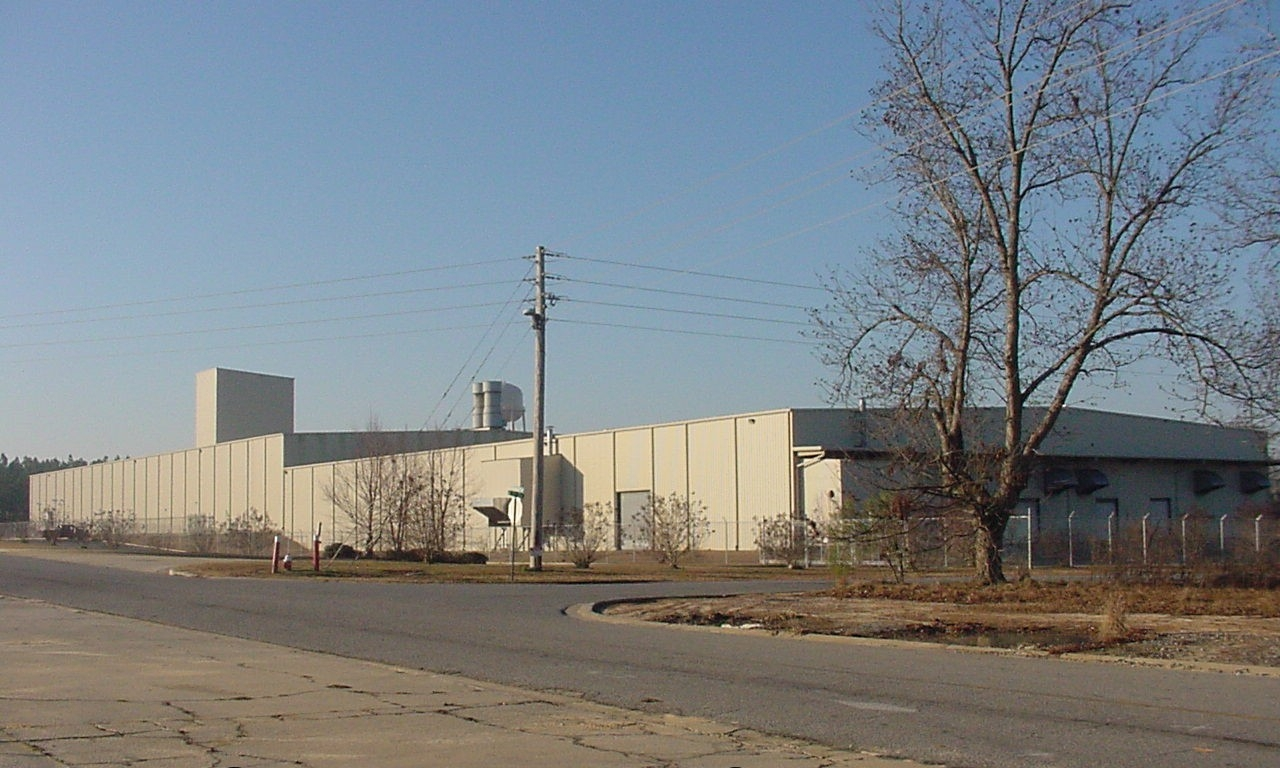

Goldens' new second facility comprises the largest step in expanding output in the company's 125-year history. The 150,000 sq ft (14,000 m^{2}) facility, built in 2001, houses a brand new Savelli cope and drag (28x36’ 12/12) molding line with automatic core setter to create small to medium-sized ductile and gray iron castings.

Although not as fast as many vertically parted molding machines, the Savelli is capable of making ~120 molds an hour. The new machine, with the expanded resources it provides, more than doubles the capacity of Goldens' casting production.

The facility also includes cleaning, finishing, and machining centers.

The building has previously housed two other foundries, Georgia Ductile and Wescast - Cordele. Both were foundries focused on supplying automotive parts for the US car industry.

Operations at the new Goldens' facility began in May 2007.

== Machining operations ==
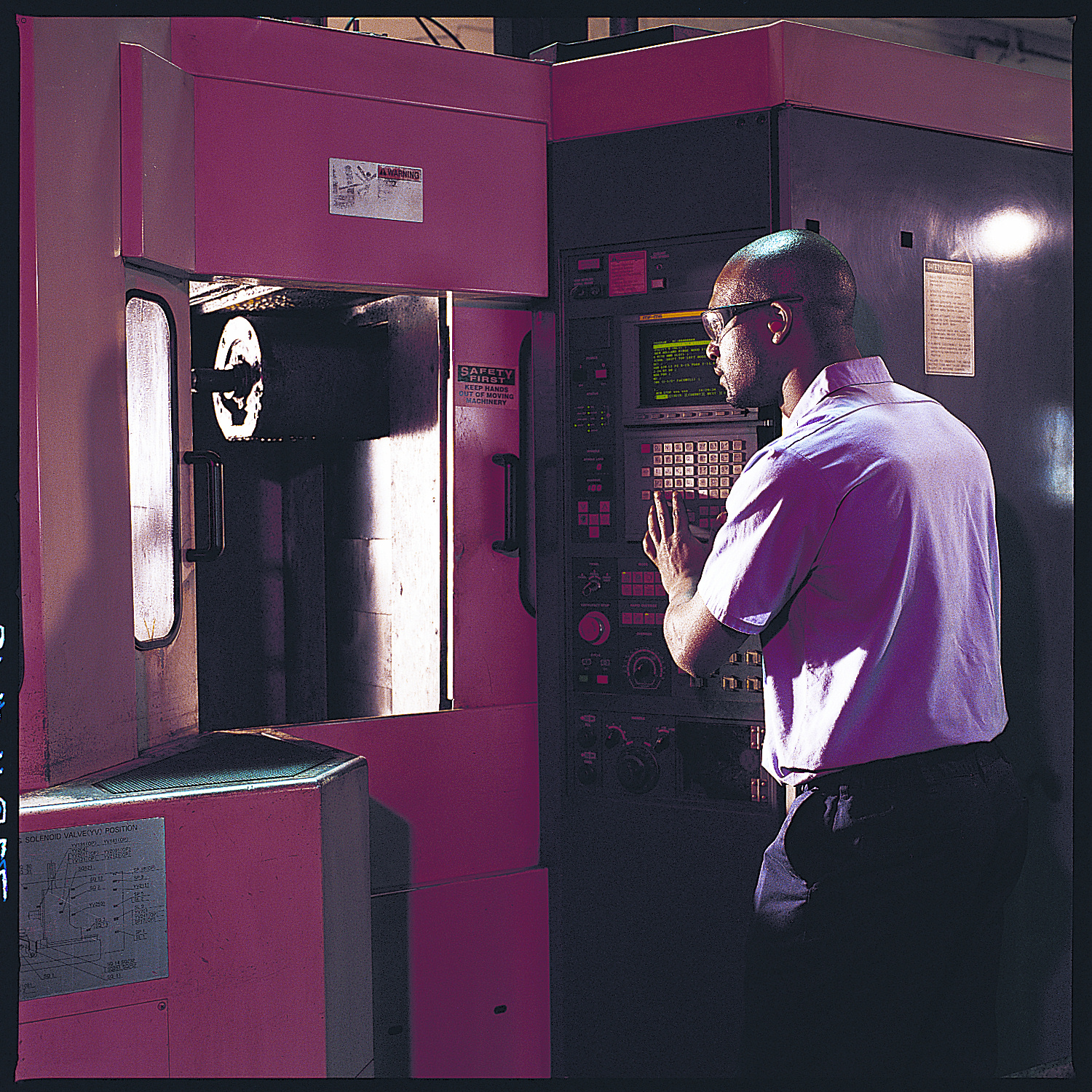
Not only a foundry, Goldens' machining facilities allows it to provide more services to casting consumers.

Goldens' machining facilities handle most operations their customers need. The operations primarily consist of turning, milling, and drilling operations, although operators perform a limited number of threading, painting, tapping, and sub-assembly operations.

The Columbus machining facility is larger than the Cordele facility, having been there since the late 1800s. The Columbus machining facility includes a larger variety of machines as well, while the Cordele facility currently only maintains horizontal milling and drilling machines.

The Columbus machining center uses horizontal milling and drilling machines with table sizes ranging from 400mm^{2} to 630mm^{2}. Vertical machines range from 20" x 39.5" to 22" x 44".

== Industries served ==
Goldens' serve a variety of industries, such as construction machinery, pumps and compressors, petroleum, mechanical power transmission, highway and off-highway trucks, farm machinery and equipment, and medical/surgical equipment. Goldens' utilizes both gray iron and ductile iron technology.
