= Canadian Wild =

Professional women's softball team

Information
- League: National Pro Fastpitch
- Location: Marion, Illinois
- Ballpark: Rent One Park
- Founded: 2019
- Ownership: Softball Canada
- Coach: Mark Smith
- Website: canadianwild.prestosports.com

The Canadian Wild, officially the Canadian Wild of Southern Illinois, were a professional women's softball team based in Marion, Illinois. They were founded in 2019 as part of National Pro Fastpitch and are partnered with the Canada women's national softball team. The team was composed entirely of Canadian players and was essentially the Canada women's national softball team which allowed the team to play against top competition for most of the year, although there are some other players from Softball Canada on the roster.

== History ==
They made their debut in the 2019 National Pro Fastpitch season, playing out of Rent One Park, in Marion, Illinois. They began the season with a six-game series sweep of the Beijing Eagles. They finished their first season in third place out of six teams, finishing with a 22–20 record.

Due to the COVID-19 pandemic, the team announced they were withdrawing from the 2020 NPF season, becoming the second team to withdraw from the season, after the Aussie Peppers, due to the pandemic. The NPF eventually cancelled the entire season, as well as the 2021 season.

== 2019 roster ==
Canadian Wild roster
Active roster (YYYY = Final season of player contract)		Inactive roster	Coaches
Pitchers: 10 Karissa Hovinga (2020) (Canada); 15 Danielle Lawrie (2020) (Canada); 21 Kenzie Friesen (2020) (Canada); 27 Sara Plourde (2020) (Canada); 29 Jenna Caira (2020) (Canada); 99 Morgan Rackel (2020) (Canada)	Catchers: 4 Victoria Rumph (2020) (Canada); 19 Emma Entzminger (2020) (Canada); Utility players: 2 Natalie Wideman (2020) (Canada); 31 Rachel Lack (2020) (Canada); Infielders: 33 Shianne Brannan (2020) (Canada); 6 Holly Speers (2020) (Canada); 1 Kelsey Jenkins (2020) (Canada); 5 Joey Lye (2020) (Canada); 14 Janet Leung (2020) (Canada); 7 Jennifer Salling (2020) (Canada); Outfielders: 3 Erika Polidori (2020) (Canada); 5 Joey Lye (2020) (Canada); 8 Victoria Hayward (2020) (Canada); 25 Jennifer Gilbert (2020) (Canada); 26 Larissa Franklin (2020) (Canada)		Legend: * Franchise Player Tag; (C) Captain; (A) Alternate captain; → All NPF rosters
