= Taran Alvelo =

American softball player (born 1996)

USSSA Pride
- Pitcher
- Born: June 14, 1996 (age 30); Carroll, Ohio, U.S.

Teams
- Washington Huskies (2016–2019); USSSA Pride (2019–20); Chicago Bandits (2020); Smash It Sports Vipers (2022); USSSA Pride (2023–present)

Career highlights and awards
- All-NPF Team (2019)
Medals
Women's softball
Representing Puerto Rico
Pan American Games
Silver medal – second place	2023 Santiago	Team
Bronze medal – third place	2019 Lima	Team
Central American and Caribbean Games
Gold medal – first place	2023 San Salvador	Team
Gold medal – first place	2026 Santo Domingo	Team

Taran Mackenzie Alvelo (born June 14, 1996) is an American professional softball player for the USSSA Pride of the Women's Professional Fastpitch (WPF). She played college softball at Washington, where she led the Huskies to three consecutive Women's College World Series appearances from 2017 to 2019. She represented Puerto Rico at the World Cup of Softball, and won a gold medal at the 2023 Central American and Caribbean Games. Alvelo stands at 5’10. Weighing 350lbs

== Early life ==
Alvelo attended Bloom-Carroll High School in Carroll, Ohio.

== College career ==
Alvelo made her college softball debut for Washington on February 12, 2016, throwing a complete game in a 10-3 shutout of No. 9 Oklahoma. She finished her freshman season with an 18-7 record, leading the Huskies in starts, complete games, innings pitched, and strikeouts, despite missing the final two series of the regular season with an ankle injury. Following the season she was named Pac-12 Freshman of the Year. She returned on the final day of the 2016 Seattle Regional against No. 12 Minnesota, then appeared in both games of the Tuscaloosa Super Regional as the Huskies were knocked out in two games by Alabama.

As the Huskies' No. 1 starter in 2017, Alvelo led the Pac-12 with 254.0 innings pitched, and her 35 wins are fourth-most in Washington history. She opened the 2017 season with a 10-inning complete game, allowing one run on four hits as the No. 13 Huskies upset No. 2 Auburn at the Puerto Vallarta College Challenge. Two days later, she threw a complete-game shutout against No. 1 Oklahoma. The weekend earned her NFCA Pitcher of the Week, ESPNW Pitcher of the Week, and the first of three Pac-12 Pitcher of the Week honors that season.

Alvelo threw her first collegiate no-hitter against Montana on May 19, 2017 in Washington's first game of the Seattle Regional and went on to throw 55 innings in 10 postseason games.

As a junior, Alvelo threw 31.1 scoreless innings to open the 2018 season, not allowing a run threw her first five outings. As the season went on, Alvelo began to split pitching duties more and more with freshman Gabbie Plain, and an injury to her ribs limited Alvelo in May. She only made one appearance in each of the Huskies' final two regular-season series, and only threw three innings at the 2018 Seattle Regional. After Plain pitched the first game of the 2018 Seattle Super Regional against No. 12 Alabama, Alvelo got the start in Game 2, striking out eight in a 94-pitch shutout.

Alvelo came out of the bullpen in Washington's first two games at the 2018 Women's College World Series, before taking the ball to start against No. 4 Oklahoma. Throwing another complete-game shutout, she struck out six Sooners to send the Huskies to the National Championship. Alvelo started Game 2 of the championship series, allowing seven runs in 3.1 innings and taking the loss as Florida State won its first Women's College World Series.

Coming into her senior season, Alvelo ranked seventh all-time in UW history with 595 strikeouts. In 16 nonconference appearances, she racked up 118 more, compiling a 1.11 ERA. Washington opened up conference play against No. 1 UCLA, with Plain coming off of two straight no-hitters. Alvelo came out of the bullpen in the Friday night game and took the loss, allowing a three-run double in the sixth inning of a 3-0 loss. Two days later, Alvelo gave up 15 runs on 15 hits in a loss.

Following the UCLA series, Alvelo bounced back. In her final 17 appearances of the regular season, she went 13-0 with a 0.75 ERA and 114 strikeouts.

With the Huskies making their third straight trip to the WCWS, Alvelo started their first game and took the loss in a complete game against Arizona. She came out of the bullpen with two outs in the bottom of the seventh inning and the tying run on second against Minnesota, getting a strikeout to keep the Huskies' season alive. Later that day, Alvelo started against Oklahoma State and struck out 16 in a 1-0 shutout, the most by a UW pitcher at the WCWS. In Washington's 10-inning loss to UCLA in the semifinals, Alvelo threw three innings of relief before giving Plain the ball back. With the final pitch of her collegiate career, she struck out Kinsley Washington looking for her 895th career strikeout, passing Jennifer Spediacci for second all-time in UW history.

== Professional career ==
On April 16, 2019, Alvelo was selected eighth overall in the 2019 NPF Draft by the Aussie Peppers of the National Pro Fastpitch league. In her rookie season, she put up a 7-1 record and a 1.38 ERA in 45.2 innings pitched.

On Jan. 15, 2020, Alvelo signed with the Chicago Bandits.

== Statistics ==
Washington Huskies
Year	App	GS	W	L	SV	CG	IP	ERA	H	R	ER	K	BB
2016	32	25	18	7	1	14	152.2	3.16	156	89	69	153	65
2017	47	38	35	9	2	29	254.0	2.07	224	92	75	200	83
2018	35	27	23	5	3	24	188.0	1.30	104	40	35	242	36
2019	41	28	26	6	3	18	203.1	1.55	146	52	45	300	43
TOTALS	155	118	102	27	9	85	798.0	1.96	630	273	224	895	227

USSSA Pride
Year	App	W	L	SV	CG	IP	ERA	H	R	ER	K	BB
2019	31	7	1	0	0	45.2	1.38	31	10	9	33	3
