= Association of Fastpitch Professionals =

Professional women's softball league

- Current season, competition or edition: 2024 Association of Fastpitch Professionals season
- Sport: Fastpitch softball
- Founded: 2023
- First season: 2024
- No. of teams: 4
- Country: United States
- Website: www.fastpitchprofessionals.com

Association of Fastpitch Professionals (AFP) was a professional women's fastpitch softball league in the United States consisting of independent teams in collaboration to create a platform for competition at the highest level. The new league began its promotional campaign in 2023 and launched its first and only official season to begin June 19, 2024. The league disbanded and was folded into Connect Softball, with some teams leaving for competing leagues.

== Teams ==
Overview of Women's Professional Fastpitch teams
Team	City	Stadium	Joined	Head coach
Oklahoma City Spark	Oklahoma City, Oklahoma	Gerry Pinkston Stadium/ USA Softball Hall of Fame Stadium	2024	Amber Flores
New York Rise	Hempstead, New York	Bill Edwards Stadium	2024	Rodney McCray
Chattanooga Steam	Chattanooga, Tennessee	Frost Stadium	2024	Marty McDaniel
Florida Vibe	Bradenton, Florida	SCF Softball Complex	2024	Leah Amico

== Championship Series ==
Championship Series history
Season	Champion	Coach	Score	Runner-up	Coach
2024	Oklahoma City Spark	Amber Flores	11-4	Florida Vibe	Leah Amico

== See also ==
- Women's sports
