= Rodney McCray (baseball) =

American baseball player (born 1963)

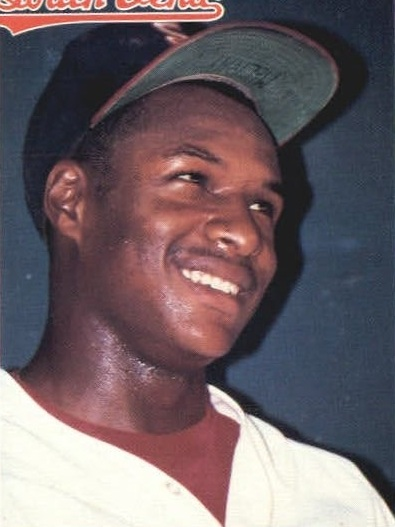
- McCray with the South Bend White Sox c. 1988
- Outfielder
- Born: September 13, 1963 (age 63); Detroit, Michigan, U.S.
- Batted: Right Threw: Right

MLB debut
- April 30, 1990, for the Chicago White Sox

Last MLB appearance
- May 11, 1992, for the New York Mets

MLB statistics
- Batting average: .214
- Runs scored: 13
- Stolen bases: 9
- Stats at Baseball Reference

Teams
- Chicago White Sox (1990–1991); New York Mets (1992)

Rodney Duncan McCray (born September 13, 1963) is an American former professional baseball player who is best known for crashing through an outfield fence attempting to make a catch. He played mostly in the minors, but also made it to the majors with the Chicago White Sox and New York Mets from 1990 to 1992. He is currently the head coach for the New York Rise of the Association of Fastpitch Professionals (AFP).

== Early life and career ==
Born in Detroit, McCray's family moved west while he was still a child. He enrolled at University High in Los Angeles, then attended West Los Angeles Junior College and Santa Monica Junior College. The speedy outfielder was drafted in the first round by the Chicago White Sox in 1982 and then by the Los Angeles Dodgers in 1983, but opted to stay in school. Finally, he signed with the San Diego Padres in 1984.

After four years in the Padres chain, the White Sox claimed him in the 1987 minor league draft. Never much of a hitter (his career minor league batting average was just .226), McCray proved effective by drawing walks (enough to pump his career on-base percentage up to .362) and stealing bases (as many as 91 in one season, with Charleston in 1986).

After making the majors with the White Sox in 1990, McCray was sent back down to the Triple-A Vancouver Canadians of the Pacific Coast League the following year. On May 27, 1991, at Civic Stadium (now Providence Park) in Portland, Oregon, McCray chased after a fly ball hit by Portland's Chip Hale. In trying to make the catch, McCray ran right through a plywood fence in right field, just to the right of the 369-foot (112 m) marker, which caused him to drop the ball. The play was shown repeatedly on newscasts across the country; a video clip of the play is now part of a blooper reel looped at the Baseball Hall of Fame.

McCray made it back up to the White Sox later that year, but was used almost exclusively as a pinch runner and backup outfielder.

After signing with the New York Mets in 1992, McCray was again relegated to pinch running until May 8 against the Dodgers in Shea Stadium, when he pinch-ran for Eddie Murray, stayed in the game as the right fielder and then batted in the ninth with two men on and the score tied at 3-3. Off reliever Tim Crews, McCray delivered a game-winning single in what was to be his only major league plate appearance of 1992 and as a Met, and the final one of his career. After appearing in two more games as a pinch runner, the Mets released McCray on June 8; after batting .242 in 61 games for the independent Thunder Bay Whiskey Jacks of the Northern League in 1993, he retired as a player.

McCray played in 67 major league games but logged just fourteen at-bats (with three hits), while stealing nine bases in ten attempts.

== Personal life ==
McCray served as a roving outfield and baserunning instructor for years in the minor league systems of the Montreal Expos, Kansas City Royals, Cincinnati Reds and Los Angeles Dodgers.

On August 12, 2006, McCray was honored in Portland with the "Rodney McCray Bobblehead Night", honoring his memorable crash through the wall. McCray threw out the first pitch, and right-center field of PGE Park was renamed "McCray Alley" in his honor. "I just wish I had run through something like a Coca-Cola sign so I could have gotten endorsements," McCray said. "Instead, I ran through a local sign, 'Flav-R-Pac meats.'"

ESPN, in its series Who's Number 1?, ranked the fence incident as the seventh-favorite sports blooper of all time. The Best Damn Sports Show Period ranked the incident number one in their countdown of the Top 50 Devastating Hits in sports history.

On June 4, 2019, McCray's son Grant was drafted by the San Francisco Giants in the third round of the 2019 MLB draft. His daughter, Sydney, was an All-Mountain West Conference first-team center fielder and Mountain West Defensive Player of the Year for Grand Canyon University in Phoenix.
