= Oklahoma City Spark =

American softball team

- Sport: Softball
- Founded: 2022
- League: Women's Professional Fastpitch (2023); Association of Fastpitch Professionals (2024); Athletes Unlimited Softball League (2026–present)
- Based in: Oklahoma City, Oklahoma
- Stadium: Tom Heath Field
- Colors: Blue, Yellow, and White
- Head coach: Amber Flores
- General manager: Kirk Walker
- Championships: 1 (2024)
- Website: theausl.com/spark

The Oklahoma City Spark are a women's professional softball team based in Oklahoma City, Oklahoma, that competes in Athletes Unlimited Softball League (AUSL). The team plays their home games at Tom Heath Field. They previously played in the Women's Professional Fastpitch and Association of Fastpitch Professionals leagues.

== History ==
The Spark were founded by Tina Floyd in 2022 as an independent franchise. They joined the Women's Professional Fastpitch (WPF) for their inaugural 2023 season, and then left the WPF following the season. They then joined the Association of Fastpitch Professionals (AFP). In July 2024, they won the inaugural AFP championship, defeating the Florida Vibe 11–4.

In June 2024, Athletes Unlimited announced the creation of the Athletes Unlimited Softball League, which featured four teams competing in a traditional season format. The league used a touring model in its first season, but switched to city-based format for the 2026 season. In November 2025, the Spark were announced as an expansion team for the 2026 season.

== Roster ==
Oklahoma City Spark roster
Active roster	Coaching staff
Pitchers: 12 Jailyn Ford; 3 Peja Goold; 23 Maya Johnson; 19 Maddie Penta; 15 Alana Vawter; Utility players: 7 Maya Brady; 31 Amari Harper; 45 Haley Lee; 42 KK Madrey; Catchers: 9 Kinzie Hansen; 8 Grace Jenkins; Infielders: 25 Sydney McKinney; 2 Sydney Romero; 24 Sydney Sherrill; 90 Jessi Warren; 97 Delanie Wisz; Outfielders: 48 Bubba Nickles-Camarena	Manager: Kirk Walker; Coaches: Amber Flores; Roster updated on July 18, 2026: Disabled list; ‡ Inactive list; § Suspended list
