= Choccolocco Park =

Baseball stadium and park in Alabama, US

- Interactive map of Choccolocco Park
- Location: Oxford, Alabama; United States
- Coordinates: 33.6006484°N 85.7884052°W
- Operator: Oxford Parks & Recreation Department
- Capacity: 1,200
- Surface: Grass
- Field size: Foul Lines: 325 (left) and 320 (right) ft. Center Field: 390 ft.

Tenants
- Jacksonville State University baseball, OVC baseball postseason tournament (2017-2018); Oxford High School baseball Choccolocco Monsters (SBL) (2022–2023); Smash It Sports Vipers (WPF) (2023–present)

Choccolocco Park is a baseball stadium located in a municipal park of the same name in Oxford, Alabama. The NCAA's Ohio Valley Conference utilized the stadium for its postseason conference baseball tournament after the 2017 and 2018 seasons.

There is also a track and field facility at Choccolocco Park, including an eight-lane running track. The track is used by the Jacksonville State Gamecocks track and field team.
