= Women's Professional Fastpitch =

Professional women's softball league

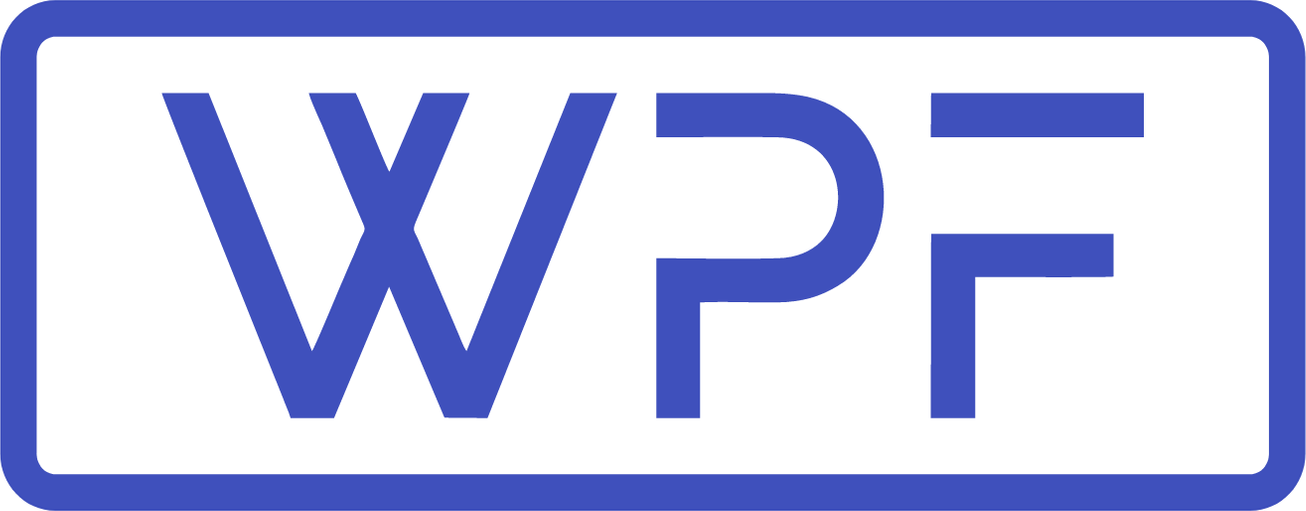
- Sport: Fastpitch softball
- Founded: October 14, 2021; 5 years ago
- First season: 2022 (exhibition)
- Most recent season: 2024
- Country: United States
- Headquarters: 4801 Gaillardia Parkway; Oklahoma City
- Most recent champion: Atlanta Smoke
- Most titles: Atlanta Smoke (3 titles)
- Website: wprofastpitch.com

Women's Professional Fastpitch (WPF) was a professional women's fastpitch softball league in the United States. The new league began its promotional campaign in 2021 and launched its first official season in 2023.

== History ==
Following the 2023 season, the Oklahoma City Spark announced their departure from the WPF in December 2023. In April 2024, the Smash It Sports Vipers and USSSA Pride both announced they would not participate in the 2024 season. Three new teams in Texas were added to replace the teams that left the league, the Coastal Bend Tidal Wave, Hub City Adelitas and Texas Monarchs.

In April 2024, B4Real Enterprises was named the league's operations and management team. On April 16, 2024, the WPF announced their intentions to expand internationally and add two teams from Mexico. However, the league suspended operations due to severe financial and logistical hurdles, notably player contract disputes, missing paychecks, and a lack of revenue-generating broadcasting. Some of the teams have moved to a new competing league called the Professional Softball League.

== Teams ==
2024 Women's Professional Fastpitch teams
Team	Location	Venue	Joined
Coastal Bend Tidal Wave	Robstown, Texas	Fairgrounds Field	2024
Hub City Adelitas	Floydada, Texas	Lady Winds Field	2024
Texas Monarchs	San Marcos, Texas	Bobcat Softball Stadium	2024
Texas Smoke	San Marcos, Texas	Bobcat Softball Stadium	2023

Former Women's Professional Fastpitch teams
Team	Location	Venue	First	Last	Status
Smash it Sports Vipers	Oxford, Alabama	Choccolocco Park	2022	2023	On hiatus
USSSA Pride	Viera, Florida	USSSA Space Coast Complex	2022	2023	On hiatus
Oklahoma City Spark	Oklahoma City, Oklahoma	USA Softball Hall of Fame Stadium	2023		AFP team

== Championship Series ==
Championship Series history
Season	Winning team	Coach	Series	Losing team	Coach
2023	Texas Smoke	Tori Tyson	2–0	USSSA Pride	Kelly Kretschman
2024	Texas Smoke	Tori Tyson	2–0	Coastal Bend Tidal Wave	Blake Miller

== See also ==
- List of organized baseball leagues
  - Athletes Unlimited Softball League
  - Women's Pro Baseball League
- Women in baseball
- Women's sports in the United States
