= Gold Glove Award =

Major League Baseball award

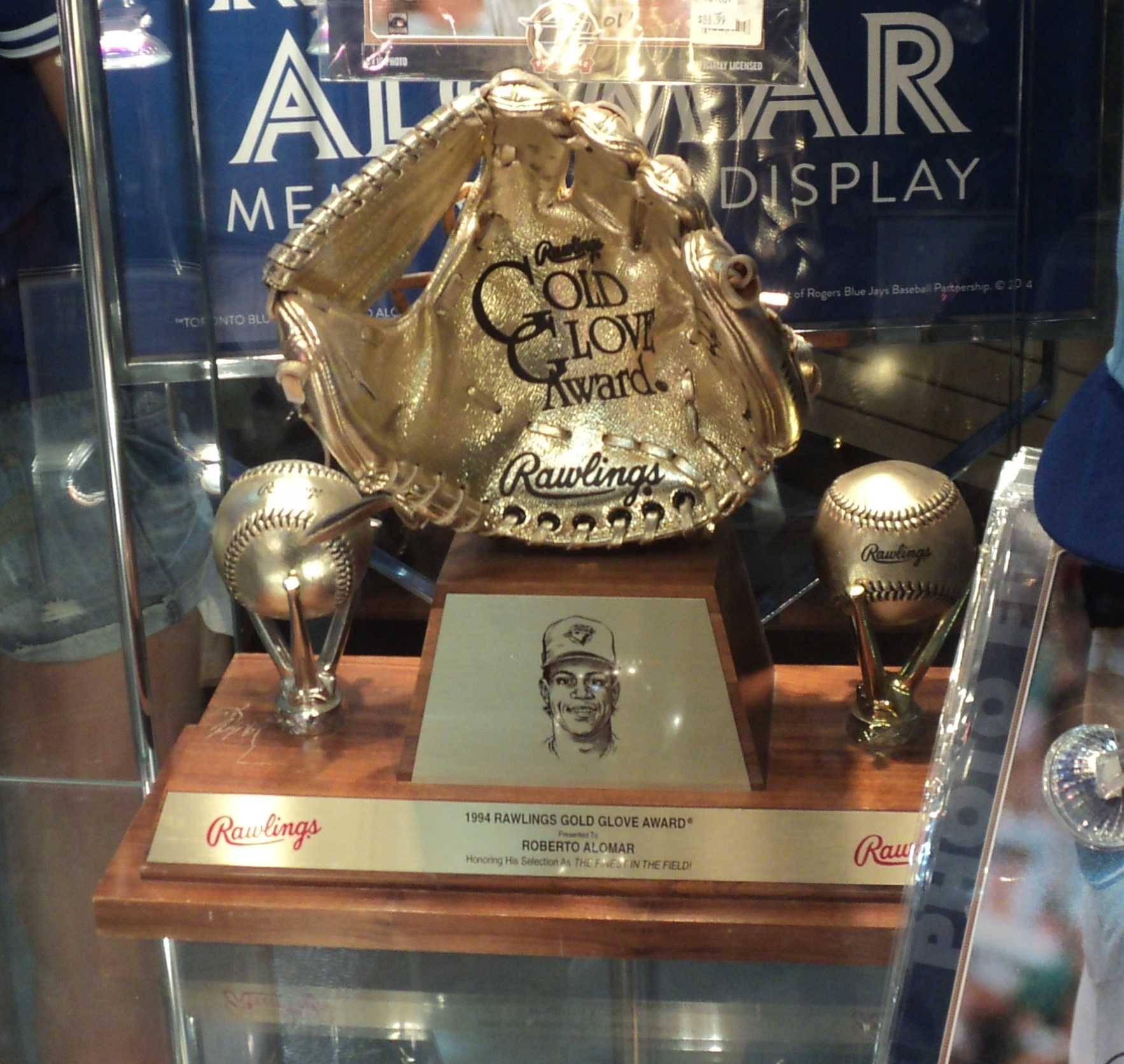
- Roberto Alomar's 1994 Gold Glove Award
- Sport: Baseball
- League: Major League Baseball
- Awarded for: Best fielding player at each position in the American League and National League
- Sponsored by: Rawlings
- Presented by: Major League Baseball

History
- First award: 1957

The Rawlings Gold Glove Award, usually referred to as simply the Gold Glove, is the award given annually to the Major League Baseball (MLB) players judged to have exhibited superior individual fielding performances. It is awarded at each fielding position in both the National League (NL) and the American League (AL). The Gold Glove is widely considered one of the most prestigious defensive awards in baseball.

Winners for position awards are determined from voting by the managers and coaches in each league, who are not permitted to vote for their own players. Additionally, a sabermetric component provided by the Society for American Baseball Research (SABR) accounts for about 25 percent of the vote. For the utility player awards, the sabermetric component and other defensive statistics are exclusively used to select the winners, without any voting by coaches.

In 1957, the baseball glove manufacturer Rawlings created the Gold Glove Award to commemorate the best fielding performance at each position. Winners receive a glove made from gold lamé-tanned leather and affixed to a walnut base. In addition, the winners also, when they're playing with Rawlings gloves and fielding equipment, get to have a special gold label signifying their accomplishment. In the inaugural year, one Gold Glove was awarded to the top fielder at each position in MLB; since 1958, separate awards have been given to the top fielders in each league. In 2020, Rawlings began issuing a Gold Glove Award for team defense, with one recipient each in the American and National Leagues. Starting in 2022, a Gold Glove Award in each league has been awarded to a utility player.

From 2016–2019, a Gold Glove was also awarded each year to one fastpitch softball player in the National Pro Fastpitch league.

== History ==
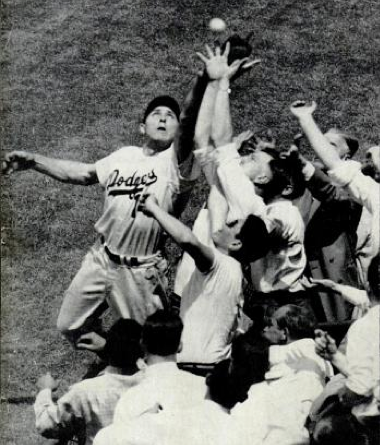
Gil Hodges was one of the first Gold Glove recipients, in 1957

For the first four seasons of the award (1957 to 1960), individual awards were presented to left fielders, center fielders, and right fielders. From 1961 through 2010, the phrase "at each position" was no longer strictly accurate, since the prize was presented to three outfielders irrespective of their specific position. Any combination of outfielders, often three center fielders, could win the award in the same year. Critics called for awarding a single Gold Glove for each individual outfield position, arguing that the three outfield positions are not equivalent defensively. Starting in 2011, separate awards for each outfield position were once again presented. In the 1985 American League voting, a tie for third-place resulted in the presentation of Gold Glove Awards to four outfielders (Dwayne Murphy, Gary Pettis, Dwight Evans and Dave Winfield); this scenario was repeated in the National League in 2007 (Andruw Jones, Carlos Beltrán, Aaron Rowand, and Jeff Francoeur).

=== Criticism ===
Before the involvement of the Society for American Baseball Research (SABR) in the voting process in 2013, The Boston Globe writer Peter Abraham argued the Fielding Bible Awards "are far more accurate (and accountable)" than the Gold Glove awards since statistics are used along with the opinions of an expert panel. The Gold Gloves are selected by managers and coaches who may have seen a player as few as six times during the season. Naturally, statistics can be contentious, and there is still no universally agreed system of fielding stats (even with advanced metrics) in 2024; moreover, a manager gets to see each team in their league during a season, and can indeed form an opinion over that span of whom they felt was the best fielder at each position.

Bill Chuck of Comcast SportsNet New England claimed that Gold Glove voters frequently counted only errors to determine winners. Geoff Baker of The Seattle Times maintained the votes for the Gold Gloves rely largely on a player's past reputation. The Associated Press proposed that "some fans have viewed the Gold Gloves as mostly a popularity contest, even suggesting that a player's performance at the plate helped draw extra attention to his glove." After winning the AL Gold Glove at first base in both 1997 and 1998, Rafael Palmeiro won again in 1999 with the Texas Rangers while only appearing in 28 games as a first baseman; he played in 128 games as a designated hitter that season, resulting in a controversy. Derek Jeter, winner of five Gold Gloves, believes that many defensive factors cannot be quantified. In 2013, Rawlings collaborated on the Gold Glove Award with SABR, who provided the SABR Defensive Index (SDI) to add a sabermetric component to the selection process. The index accounted for 25 percent of the vote, while managers and coaches continued to provide the majority. Afterwards, Jay Jaffe of Sports Illustrated wrote that the Gold Gloves "appear to have significantly closed the gap on their more statistically driven counterparts." SABR and FiveThirtyEight believed that the impact to the voting results by SDI, which is also included on the voters' ballots, went beyond its own 25% weight and also influenced the managers' and coaches' voting.

=== Multiple winners ===
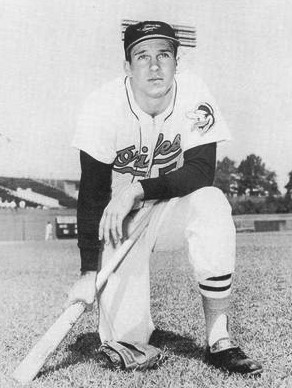
Brooks Robinson won 16 Gold Gloves, the most of any position player.

The most Gold Gloves ever won by one player is 18 by pitcher Greg Maddux. He won 13 consecutive awards from 1990 to 2002, all in the National League. Brooks Robinson has the most wins for a position player, with 16 Gold Gloves, all at third base, and is tied for the second-highest total overall with pitcher Jim Kaat; both players won their 16 awards consecutively. Iván Rodríguez has won the most Gold Gloves as a catcher, with 13 career awards in the American League. Ozzie Smith has 13 wins at shortstop; he and Rodríguez are tied for the fourth-highest total among all winners. Among outfielders, Roberto Clemente and Willie Mays, who played primarily right field and center field, respectively, are tied for the lead with 12 Gold Gloves. Keith Hernandez, the leader at first base, has won 11 times, and Roberto Alomar leads second basemen with 10 wins. Other players with 10 or more wins include shortstop Omar Vizquel (11), catcher Johnny Bench (10), third basemen Mike Schmidt (10), and Nolan Arenado (10) and outfielders Ken Griffey Jr., Ichiro Suzuki, Andruw Jones, and Al Kaline (10 each).

The only player to win Gold Gloves as an infielder and outfielder is Darin Erstad, who won Gold Gloves as an outfielder in 2000 and 2002 and as a first baseman in 2004, all with the Los Angeles Angels. The only other player to win Gold Gloves at multiple positions is Plácido Polanco, who won at second base (2007, 2009 AL) and third base (2011 NL). Family pairs to win Gold Gloves include brothers Ken and Clete Boyer (third base), brothers Sandy Alomar Jr. (catcher) and Roberto Alomar (second base), Bengie and Yadier Molina (catcher), father and son Bobby and Barry Bonds (outfield), and father and son Bob (catcher) and Bret Boone (second base).

The 2021 St. Louis Cardinals hold the record for most Gold Gloves by a single team in a single season with five. They also won the team Gold Glove for the National League in the same year. The St. Louis Cardinals are the first team to win 100 total Gold Gloves.

== Winners by year ==
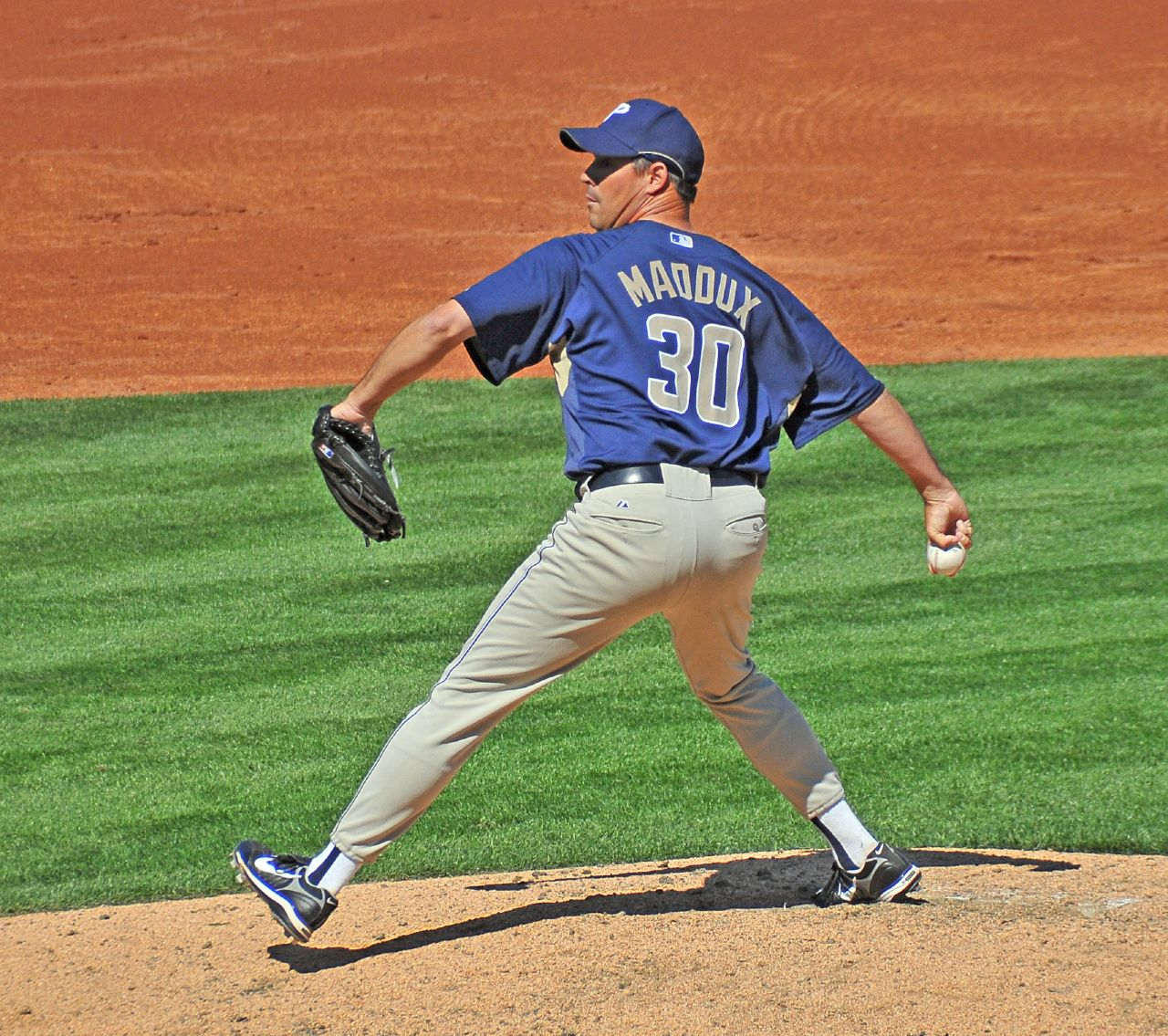
Greg Maddux won 18 Gold Gloves, the most of any player.

Key to symbols and headers in player lists
Year	Links to the corresponding Major League Baseball season
1B	First baseman (list of winners)
2B	Second baseman (list of winners)
3B	Third baseman (list of winners)
SS	Shortstop (list of winners)
OF	Outfielder (Note: From 1957 to 1960, and since 2011, individual awards were specified for left fielder, center fielder, and right fielder. From 1961 to 2010, the prize was presented to three outfielders irrespective of their specific position.) (list of winners)
C	Catcher (list of winners)
P	Pitcher (list of winners)
UT	Utility player
* or **	Winner of the most Gold Glove Awards at his position (** indicates tie)
†	Member of the National Baseball Hall of Fame and Museum

=== American League ===
Gold Glove winners in the American League, listed by position
Year	1B	2B	3B	SS	OF	OF	OF	C	P	UT	Team
1957 (Note: In 1957, Gold Gloves were given to the top fielders across Major League Baseball, instead of separate awards for each league. Winners are listed in both tables, using normal font for their own league and italics for the other league.)	Gil Hodges^{†}	Nellie Fox^{†}	Frank Malzone	Roy McMillan	Minnie Miñoso^{†}^{LF}	Willie Mays**^{†}^{CF}	Al Kaline^{†}^{RF}	Sherm Lollar	Bobby Shantz	N/A	
1958	Vic Power	Frank Bolling	Frank Malzone	Luis Aparicio^{†}	Norm Siebern^{LF}	Jimmy Piersall^{CF}	Al Kaline^{†}^{RF}	Sherm Lollar	Bobby Shantz	N/A	
1959	Vic Power	Nellie Fox^{†}	Frank Malzone	Luis Aparicio^{†}	Minnie Miñoso^{†}^{LF}	Al Kaline^{†}^{CF}	Jackie Jensen^{RF}	Sherm Lollar	Bobby Shantz	N/A	
1960	Vic Power	Nellie Fox^{†}	Brooks Robinson*^{†}	Luis Aparicio^{†}	Minnie Miñoso^{†}^{LF}	Jim Landis^{CF}	Roger Maris^{RF}	Earl Battey	Bobby Shantz	N/A	
1961	Vic Power	Bobby Richardson	Brooks Robinson*^{†}	Luis Aparicio^{†}	Jim Landis	Al Kaline^{†}	Jimmy Piersall	Earl Battey	Frank Lary	N/A	
1962	Vic Power	Bobby Richardson	Brooks Robinson*^{†}	Luis Aparicio^{†}	Jim Landis	Al Kaline^{†}	Mickey Mantle^{†}	Earl Battey	Jim Kaat^{†}	N/A	
1963	Vic Power	Bobby Richardson	Brooks Robinson*^{†}	Zoilo Versalles	Jim Landis	Al Kaline^{†}	Carl Yastrzemski^{†}	Elston Howard	Jim Kaat^{†}	N/A	
1964	Vic Power	Bobby Richardson	Brooks Robinson*^{†}	Luis Aparicio^{†}	Jim Landis	Al Kaline^{†}	Vic Davalillo	Elston Howard	Jim Kaat^{†}	N/A	
1965	Joe Pepitone	Bobby Richardson	Brooks Robinson*^{†}	Zoilo Versalles	Tom Tresh	Al Kaline^{†}	Carl Yastrzemski^{†}	Bill Freehan	Jim Kaat^{†}	N/A	
1966	Joe Pepitone	Bobby Knoop	Brooks Robinson*^{†}	Luis Aparicio^{†}	Tommie Agee	Al Kaline^{†}	Tony Oliva^{†}	Bill Freehan	Jim Kaat^{†}	N/A	
1967	George Scott	Bobby Knoop	Brooks Robinson*^{†}	Jim Fregosi	Paul Blair	Al Kaline^{†}	Carl Yastrzemski^{†}	Bill Freehan	Jim Kaat^{†}	N/A	
1968	George Scott	Bobby Knoop	Brooks Robinson*^{†}	Luis Aparicio^{†}	Reggie Smith	Mickey Stanley	Carl Yastrzemski^{†}	Bill Freehan	Jim Kaat^{†}	N/A	
1969	Joe Pepitone	Davey Johnson	Brooks Robinson*^{†}	Mark Belanger	Paul Blair	Mickey Stanley	Carl Yastrzemski^{†}	Bill Freehan	Jim Kaat^{†}	N/A	
1970	Jim Spencer	Davey Johnson	Brooks Robinson*^{†}	Luis Aparicio^{†}	Paul Blair	Mickey Stanley	Ken Berry	Ray Fosse	Jim Kaat^{†}	N/A	
1971	George Scott	Davey Johnson	Brooks Robinson*^{†}	Mark Belanger	Paul Blair	Amos Otis	Carl Yastrzemski^{†}	Ray Fosse	Jim Kaat^{†}	N/A	
1972	George Scott	Doug Griffin	Brooks Robinson*^{†}	Ed Brinkman	Paul Blair	Bobby Murcer	Ken Berry	Carlton Fisk^{†}	Jim Kaat^{†}	N/A	
1973	George Scott	Bobby Grich	Brooks Robinson*^{†}	Mark Belanger	Paul Blair	Amos Otis	Mickey Stanley	Thurman Munson	Jim Kaat^{†}	N/A	
1974	George Scott	Bobby Grich	Brooks Robinson*^{†}	Mark Belanger	Paul Blair	Amos Otis	Joe Rudi	Thurman Munson	Jim Kaat^{†}	N/A	
1975	George Scott	Bobby Grich	Brooks Robinson*^{†}	Mark Belanger	Paul Blair	Fred Lynn	Joe Rudi	Thurman Munson	Jim Kaat^{†}	N/A	
1976	George Scott	Bobby Grich	Aurelio Rodríguez	Mark Belanger	Dwight Evans	Rick Manning	Joe Rudi	Jim Sundberg	Jim Palmer^{†}	N/A	
1977	Jim Spencer	Frank White	Graig Nettles	Mark Belanger	Juan Beníquez	Al Cowens	Carl Yastrzemski^{†}	Jim Sundberg	Jim Palmer^{†}	N/A	
1978	Chris Chambliss	Frank White	Graig Nettles	Mark Belanger	Dwight Evans	Fred Lynn	Rick Miller	Jim Sundberg	Jim Palmer^{†}	N/A	
1979	Cecil Cooper	Frank White	Buddy Bell	Rick Burleson	Dwight Evans	Fred Lynn	Sixto Lezcano	Jim Sundberg	Jim Palmer^{†}	N/A	
1980	Cecil Cooper	Frank White	Buddy Bell	Alan Trammell^{†}	Willie Wilson	Fred Lynn	Dwayne Murphy	Jim Sundberg	Mike Norris	N/A	
1981	Mike Squires	Frank White	Buddy Bell	Alan Trammell^{†}	Dwight Evans	Rickey Henderson^{†}	Dwayne Murphy	Jim Sundberg	Mike Norris	N/A	
1982	Eddie Murray^{†}	Frank White	Buddy Bell	Robin Yount^{†}	Dwight Evans	Dave Winfield^{†}	Dwayne Murphy	Bob Boone	Ron Guidry	N/A	
1983	Eddie Murray^{†}	Lou Whitaker	Buddy Bell	Alan Trammell^{†}	Dwight Evans	Dave Winfield^{†}	Dwayne Murphy	Lance Parrish	Ron Guidry	N/A	
1984	Eddie Murray^{†}	Lou Whitaker	Buddy Bell	Alan Trammell^{†}	Dwight Evans	Dave Winfield^{†}	Dwayne Murphy	Lance Parrish	Ron Guidry	N/A	
1985	Don Mattingly	Lou Whitaker	George Brett^{†}	Alfredo Griffin	Dwight Evans	Dave Winfield^{†} & Gary Pettis	Dwayne Murphy	Lance Parrish	Ron Guidry	N/A	
1986	Don Mattingly	Frank White	Gary Gaetti	Tony Fernández	Kirby Puckett^{†}	Gary Pettis	Jesse Barfield	Bob Boone	Ron Guidry	N/A	
1987	Don Mattingly	Frank White	Gary Gaetti	Tony Fernández	Kirby Puckett^{†}	Dave Winfield^{†}	Jesse Barfield	Bob Boone	Mark Langston	N/A	
1988	Don Mattingly	Harold Reynolds	Gary Gaetti	Tony Fernández	Kirby Puckett^{†}	Gary Pettis	Devon White	Bob Boone	Mark Langston	N/A	
1989	Don Mattingly	Harold Reynolds	Gary Gaetti	Tony Fernández	Kirby Puckett^{†}	Gary Pettis	Devon White	Bob Boone	Bret Saberhagen	N/A	
1990	Mark McGwire	Harold Reynolds	Kelly Gruber	Ozzie Guillén	Gary Pettis	Ellis Burks	Ken Griffey Jr.^{†}	Sandy Alomar Jr.	Mike Boddicker	N/A	
1991	Don Mattingly	Roberto Alomar*^{†}	Robin Ventura	Cal Ripken Jr.^{†}	Kirby Puckett^{†}	Devon White	Ken Griffey Jr.^{†}	Tony Peña	Mark Langston	N/A	
1992	Don Mattingly	Roberto Alomar*^{†}	Robin Ventura	Cal Ripken Jr.^{†}	Kirby Puckett^{†}	Devon White	Ken Griffey Jr.^{†}	Iván Rodríguez*^{†}	Mark Langston	N/A	
1993	Don Mattingly	Roberto Alomar*^{†}	Robin Ventura	Omar Vizquel	Kenny Lofton	Devon White	Ken Griffey Jr.^{†}	Iván Rodríguez*^{†}	Mark Langston	N/A	
1994	Don Mattingly	Roberto Alomar*^{†}	Wade Boggs^{†}	Omar Vizquel	Kenny Lofton	Devon White	Ken Griffey Jr.^{†}	Iván Rodríguez*^{†}	Mark Langston	N/A	
1995	J. T. Snow	Roberto Alomar*^{†}	Wade Boggs^{†}	Omar Vizquel	Kenny Lofton	Devon White	Ken Griffey Jr.^{†}	Iván Rodríguez*^{†}	Mark Langston	N/A	
1996	J. T. Snow	Roberto Alomar*^{†}	Robin Ventura	Omar Vizquel	Kenny Lofton	Jay Buhner	Ken Griffey Jr.^{†}	Iván Rodríguez*^{†}	Mike Mussina^{†}	N/A	
1997	Rafael Palmeiro	Chuck Knoblauch	Matt Williams	Omar Vizquel	Bernie Williams	Jim Edmonds	Ken Griffey Jr.^{†}	Iván Rodríguez*^{†}	Mike Mussina^{†}	N/A	
1998	Rafael Palmeiro	Roberto Alomar*^{†}	Robin Ventura	Omar Vizquel	Bernie Williams	Jim Edmonds	Ken Griffey Jr.^{†}	Iván Rodríguez*^{†}	Mike Mussina^{†}	N/A	
1999	Rafael Palmeiro	Roberto Alomar*^{†}	Scott Brosius	Omar Vizquel	Bernie Williams	Shawn Green	Ken Griffey Jr.^{†}	Iván Rodríguez*^{†}	Mike Mussina^{†}	N/A	
2000	John Olerud	Roberto Alomar*^{†}	Travis Fryman	Omar Vizquel	Bernie Williams	Jermaine Dye	Darin Erstad	Iván Rodríguez*^{†}	Kenny Rogers	N/A	
2001	Doug Mientkiewicz	Roberto Alomar*^{†}	Eric Chavez	Omar Vizquel	Torii Hunter	Mike Cameron	Ichiro Suzuki^{†}	Iván Rodríguez*^{†}	Mike Mussina^{†}	N/A	
2002	John Olerud	Bret Boone	Eric Chavez	Alex Rodriguez	Torii Hunter	Darin Erstad	Ichiro Suzuki^{†}	Bengie Molina	Kenny Rogers	N/A	
2003	John Olerud	Bret Boone	Eric Chavez	Alex Rodriguez	Torii Hunter	Mike Cameron	Ichiro Suzuki^{†}	Bengie Molina	Mike Mussina^{†}	N/A	
2004	Darin Erstad	Bret Boone	Eric Chavez	Derek Jeter^{†}	Torii Hunter	Vernon Wells	Ichiro Suzuki^{†}	Iván Rodríguez*^{†}	Kenny Rogers	N/A	
2005	Mark Teixeira	Orlando Hudson	Eric Chavez	Derek Jeter^{†}	Torii Hunter	Vernon Wells	Ichiro Suzuki^{†}	Jason Varitek	Kenny Rogers	N/A	
2006	Mark Teixeira	Mark Grudzielanek	Eric Chavez	Derek Jeter^{†}	Torii Hunter	Vernon Wells	Ichiro Suzuki^{†}	Iván Rodríguez*^{†}	Kenny Rogers	N/A	
2007	Kevin Youkilis	Plácido Polanco	Adrián Beltré^{†}	Orlando Cabrera	Torii Hunter	Grady Sizemore	Ichiro Suzuki^{†}	Iván Rodríguez*^{†}	Johan Santana	N/A	
2008	Carlos Peña	Dustin Pedroia	Adrián Beltré^{†}	Michael Young	Torii Hunter	Grady Sizemore	Ichiro Suzuki^{†}	Joe Mauer^{†}	Mike Mussina^{†}	N/A	
2009	Mark Teixeira	Plácido Polanco	Evan Longoria	Derek Jeter^{†}	Torii Hunter	Adam Jones	Ichiro Suzuki^{†}	Joe Mauer^{†}	Mark Buehrle	N/A	
2010	Mark Teixeira	Robinson Canó	Evan Longoria	Derek Jeter^{†}	Carl Crawford	Franklin Gutiérrez	Ichiro Suzuki^{†}	Joe Mauer^{†}	Mark Buehrle	N/A	
2011	Adrián González	Dustin Pedroia	Adrián Beltré^{†}	Erick Aybar	Alex Gordon^{LF}	Jacoby Ellsbury^{CF}	Nick Markakis^{RF}	Matt Wieters	Mark Buehrle	N/A	
2012	Mark Teixeira	Robinson Canó	Adrián Beltré^{†}	J. J. Hardy	Alex Gordon^{LF}	Adam Jones^{CF}	Josh Reddick^{RF}	Matt Wieters	Jeremy Hellickson & Jake Peavy	N/A	
2013	Eric Hosmer	Dustin Pedroia	Manny Machado	J. J. Hardy	Alex Gordon^{LF}	Adam Jones^{CF}	Shane Victorino ^{RF}	Salvador Pérez	R. A. Dickey	N/A	
2014	Eric Hosmer	Dustin Pedroia	Kyle Seager	J. J. Hardy	Alex Gordon^{LF}	Adam Jones^{CF}	Nick Markakis^{RF}	Salvador Pérez	Dallas Keuchel	N/A	
2015	Eric Hosmer	Jose Altuve	Manny Machado	Alcides Escobar	Yoenis Céspedes^{LF}	Kevin Kiermaier^{CF}	Kole Calhoun^{RF}	Salvador Pérez	Dallas Keuchel	N/A	
2016	Mitch Moreland	Ian Kinsler	Adrián Beltré^{†}	Francisco Lindor	Brett Gardner^{LF}	Kevin Kiermaier^{CF}	Mookie Betts^{RF}	Salvador Pérez	Dallas Keuchel	N/A	
2017	Eric Hosmer	Brian Dozier	Evan Longoria	Andrelton Simmons	Alex Gordon^{LF}	Byron Buxton^{CF}	Mookie Betts^{RF}	Martín Maldonado	Marcus Stroman	N/A	
2018	Matt Olson	Ian Kinsler	Matt Chapman	Andrelton Simmons	Alex Gordon^{LF}	Jackie Bradley Jr.^{CF}	Mookie Betts^{RF}	Salvador Pérez	Dallas Keuchel	N/A	
2019	Matt Olson	Yolmer Sánchez	Matt Chapman	Francisco Lindor	Alex Gordon^{LF}	Kevin Kiermaier^{CF}	Mookie Betts^{RF}	Roberto Pérez	Mike Leake	N/A	
2020	Evan White	César Hernández	Isiah Kiner-Falefa	J. P. Crawford	Alex Gordon^{LF}	Luis Robert Jr.^{CF}	Joey Gallo^{RF}	Roberto Pérez	Griffin Canning	N/A	Cleveland Indians
2021	Yuli Gurriel	Marcus Semien	Matt Chapman	Carlos Correa	Andrew Benintendi^{LF}	Michael A. Taylor^{CF}	Joey Gallo^{RF}	Sean Murphy	Dallas Keuchel	N/A	Houston Astros
2022	Vladimir Guerrero Jr.	Andrés Giménez	Ramón Urías	Jeremy Peña	Steven Kwan ^{LF}	Myles Straw^{CF}	Kyle Tucker^{RF}	Jose Trevino	Shane Bieber	DJ LeMahieu	New York Yankees
2023	Nathaniel Lowe	Andrés Giménez	Matt Chapman	Anthony Volpe	Steven Kwan ^{LF}	Kevin Kiermaier^{CF}	Adolis García^{RF}	Jonah Heim	José Berríos	Mauricio Dubón	Toronto Blue Jays
2024	Carlos Santana	Andrés Giménez	Alex Bregman	Bobby Witt Jr.	Steven Kwan ^{LF}	Daulton Varsho^{CF}	Wilyer Abreu^{RF}	Cal Raleigh	Seth Lugo	Dylan Moore	Toronto Blue Jays
2025	Ty France	Marcus Semien	Maikel Garcia	Bobby Witt Jr.	Steven Kwan ^{LF}	Ceddanne Rafaela^{CF}	Wilyer Abreu^{RF}	Dillon Dingler	Max Fried	Mauricio Dubón	Texas Rangers
2026	Christian Walker	Cole Young	Caleb Durbin	Taylor Walls	Cody Bellinger ^{LF}	Ceddanne Rafaela^{CF}	Wilyer Abreu^{RF}	Dillon Dingler	Tanner Bibee	Ezequiel Durán	Toronto Blue Jays

=== National League ===
Gold Glove winners in the National League, listed by position
Year	1B	2B	3B	SS	OF	OF	OF	C	P	UT	Team
1957	Gil Hodges^{†}	Nellie Fox^{†}	Frank Malzone	Roy McMillan	Minnie Miñoso^{†}^{LF}	Willie Mays**^{†}^{CF}	Al Kaline^{†}^{RF}	Sherm Lollar	Bobby Shantz	N/A	
1958	Gil Hodges^{†}	Bill Mazeroski^{†}	Ken Boyer	Roy McMillan	Frank Robinson^{†}^{LF}	Willie Mays**^{†}^{CF}	Hank Aaron^{†}^{RF}	Del Crandall	Harvey Haddix	N/A	
1959	Gil Hodges^{†}	Charlie Neal	Ken Boyer	Roy McMillan	Jackie Brandt^{LF}	Willie Mays**^{†}^{CF}	Hank Aaron^{†}^{RF}	Del Crandall	Harvey Haddix	N/A	
1960	Bill White	Bill Mazeroski^{†}	Ken Boyer	Ernie Banks^{†}	Wally Moon^{LF}	Willie Mays**^{†}^{CF}	Hank Aaron^{†}^{RF}	Del Crandall	Harvey Haddix	N/A	
1961	Bill White	Bill Mazeroski^{†}	Ken Boyer	Maury Wills	Vada Pinson	Roberto Clemente**^{†}	Willie Mays**^{†}	John Roseboro	Bobby Shantz	N/A	
1962	Bill White	Ken Hubbs	Jim Davenport	Maury Wills	Bill Virdon	Roberto Clemente**^{†}	Willie Mays**^{†}	Del Crandall	Bobby Shantz	N/A	
1963	Bill White	Bill Mazeroski^{†}	Ken Boyer	Bobby Wine	Curt Flood	Roberto Clemente**^{†}	Willie Mays**^{†}	Johnny Edwards	Bobby Shantz	N/A	
1964	Bill White	Bill Mazeroski^{†}	Ron Santo^{†}	Rubén Amaro Sr.	Curt Flood	Roberto Clemente**^{†}	Willie Mays**^{†}	Johnny Edwards	Bobby Shantz	N/A	
1965	Bill White	Bill Mazeroski^{†}	Ron Santo^{†}	Leo Cárdenas	Curt Flood	Roberto Clemente**^{†}	Willie Mays**^{†}	Joe Torre^{†}	Bob Gibson^{†}	N/A	
1966	Bill White	Bill Mazeroski^{†}	Ron Santo^{†}	Gene Alley	Curt Flood	Roberto Clemente**^{†}	Willie Mays**^{†}	John Roseboro	Bob Gibson^{†}	N/A	
1967	Wes Parker	Bill Mazeroski^{†}	Ron Santo^{†}	Gene Alley	Curt Flood	Roberto Clemente**^{†}	Willie Mays**^{†}	Randy Hundley	Bob Gibson^{†}	N/A	
1968	Wes Parker	Glenn Beckert	Ron Santo^{†}	Dal Maxvill	Curt Flood	Roberto Clemente**^{†}	Willie Mays**^{†}	Johnny Bench^{†}	Bob Gibson^{†}	N/A	
1969	Wes Parker	Félix Millán	Clete Boyer	Don Kessinger	Curt Flood	Roberto Clemente**^{†}	Pete Rose	Johnny Bench^{†}	Bob Gibson^{†}	N/A	
1970	Wes Parker	Tommy Helms	Doug Rader	Don Kessinger	Tommie Agee	Roberto Clemente**^{†}	Pete Rose	Johnny Bench^{†}	Bob Gibson^{†}	N/A	
1971	Wes Parker	Tommy Helms	Doug Rader	Bud Harrelson	Willie Davis	Roberto Clemente**^{†}	Bobby Bonds	Johnny Bench^{†}	Bob Gibson^{†}	N/A	
1972	Wes Parker	Félix Millán	Doug Rader	Larry Bowa	Willie Davis	Roberto Clemente**^{†}	César Cedeño	Johnny Bench^{†}	Bob Gibson^{†}	N/A	
1973	Mike Jorgensen	Joe Morgan^{†}	Doug Rader	Roger Metzger	Willie Davis	Bobby Bonds	César Cedeño	Johnny Bench^{†}	Bob Gibson^{†}	N/A	
1974	Steve Garvey	Joe Morgan^{†}	Doug Rader	Dave Concepción	César Gerónimo	Bobby Bonds	César Cedeño	Johnny Bench^{†}	Andy Messersmith	N/A	
1975	Steve Garvey	Joe Morgan^{†}	Ken Reitz	Dave Concepción	César Gerónimo	Garry Maddox	César Cedeño	Johnny Bench^{†}	Andy Messersmith	N/A	
1976	Steve Garvey	Joe Morgan^{†}	Mike Schmidt^{†}	Dave Concepción	César Gerónimo	Garry Maddox	César Cedeño	Johnny Bench^{†}	Jim Kaat^{†}	N/A	
1977	Steve Garvey	Joe Morgan^{†}	Mike Schmidt^{†}	Dave Concepción	César Gerónimo	Garry Maddox	Dave Parker^{†}	Johnny Bench^{†}	Jim Kaat^{†}	N/A	
1978	Keith Hernandez*	Davey Lopes	Mike Schmidt^{†}	Larry Bowa	Ellis Valentine	Garry Maddox	Dave Parker^{†}	Bob Boone	Phil Niekro^{†}	N/A	
1979	Keith Hernandez*	Manny Trillo	Mike Schmidt^{†}	Dave Concepción	Dave Winfield^{†}	Garry Maddox	Dave Parker^{†}	Bob Boone	Phil Niekro^{†}	N/A	
1980	Keith Hernandez*	Doug Flynn	Mike Schmidt^{†}	Ozzie Smith*^{†}	Dave Winfield^{†}	Garry Maddox	Andre Dawson^{†}	Gary Carter^{†}	Phil Niekro^{†}	N/A	
1981	Keith Hernandez*	Manny Trillo	Mike Schmidt^{†}	Ozzie Smith*^{†}	Dusty Baker	Garry Maddox	Andre Dawson^{†}	Gary Carter^{†}	Steve Carlton^{†}	N/A	
1982	Keith Hernandez*	Manny Trillo	Mike Schmidt^{†}	Ozzie Smith*^{†}	Dale Murphy	Garry Maddox	Andre Dawson^{†}	Gary Carter^{†}	Phil Niekro^{†}	N/A	
1983	Keith Hernandez*	Ryne Sandberg^{†}	Mike Schmidt^{†}	Ozzie Smith*^{†}	Dale Murphy	Willie McGee	Andre Dawson^{†}	Tony Peña	Phil Niekro^{†}	N/A	
1984	Keith Hernandez*	Ryne Sandberg^{†}	Mike Schmidt^{†}	Ozzie Smith*^{†}	Dale Murphy	Bob Dernier	Andre Dawson^{†}	Tony Peña	Joaquín Andújar	N/A	
1985	Keith Hernandez*	Ryne Sandberg^{†}	Tim Wallach	Ozzie Smith*^{†}	Dale Murphy	Willie McGee	Andre Dawson^{†}	Tony Peña	Rick Reuschel	N/A	
1986	Keith Hernandez*	Ryne Sandberg^{†}	Mike Schmidt^{†}	Ozzie Smith*^{†}	Dale Murphy	Willie McGee	Tony Gwynn^{†}	Jody Davis	Fernando Valenzuela	N/A	
1987	Keith Hernandez*	Ryne Sandberg^{†}	Terry Pendleton	Ozzie Smith*^{†}	Eric Davis	Andre Dawson^{†}	Tony Gwynn^{†}	Mike LaValliere	Rick Reuschel	N/A	
1988	Keith Hernandez*	Ryne Sandberg^{†}	Tim Wallach	Ozzie Smith*^{†}	Eric Davis	Andre Dawson^{†}	Andy Van Slyke	Benito Santiago	Orel Hershiser	N/A	
1989	Andrés Galarraga	Ryne Sandberg^{†}	Terry Pendleton	Ozzie Smith*^{†}	Eric Davis	Tony Gwynn^{†}	Andy Van Slyke	Benito Santiago	Ron Darling	N/A	
1990	Andrés Galarraga	Ryne Sandberg^{†}	Tim Wallach	Ozzie Smith*^{†}	Barry Bonds	Tony Gwynn^{†}	Andy Van Slyke	Benito Santiago	Greg Maddux*^{†}	N/A	
1991	Will Clark	Ryne Sandberg^{†}	Matt Williams	Ozzie Smith*^{†}	Barry Bonds	Tony Gwynn^{†}	Andy Van Slyke	Tom Pagnozzi	Greg Maddux*^{†}	N/A	
1992	Mark Grace	José Lind	Terry Pendleton	Ozzie Smith*^{†}	Barry Bonds	Larry Walker^{†}	Andy Van Slyke	Tom Pagnozzi	Greg Maddux*^{†}	N/A	
1993	Mark Grace	Robby Thompson	Matt Williams	Jay Bell	Barry Bonds	Larry Walker^{†}	Marquis Grissom	Kirt Manwaring	Greg Maddux*^{†}	N/A	
1994	Jeff Bagwell^{†}	Craig Biggio^{†}	Matt Williams	Barry Larkin^{†}	Barry Bonds	Darren Lewis	Marquis Grissom	Tom Pagnozzi	Greg Maddux*^{†}	N/A	
1995	Mark Grace	Craig Biggio^{†}	Ken Caminiti	Barry Larkin^{†}	Raúl Mondesí	Steve Finley	Marquis Grissom	Charles Johnson	Greg Maddux*^{†}	N/A	
1996	Mark Grace	Craig Biggio^{†}	Ken Caminiti	Barry Larkin^{†}	Barry Bonds	Steve Finley	Marquis Grissom	Charles Johnson	Greg Maddux*^{†}	N/A	
1997	J. T. Snow	Craig Biggio^{†}	Ken Caminiti	Rey Ordóñez	Barry Bonds	Larry Walker^{†}	Raúl Mondesí	Charles Johnson	Greg Maddux*^{†}	N/A	
1998	J. T. Snow	Bret Boone	Scott Rolen^{†}	Rey Ordóñez	Barry Bonds	Larry Walker^{†}	Andruw Jones^{†}	Charles Johnson	Greg Maddux*^{†}	N/A	
1999	J. T. Snow	Pokey Reese	Robin Ventura	Rey Ordóñez	Steve Finley	Larry Walker^{†}	Andruw Jones^{†}	Mike Lieberthal	Greg Maddux*^{†}	N/A	
2000	J. T. Snow	Pokey Reese	Scott Rolen^{†}	Neifi Pérez	Steve Finley	Jim Edmonds	Andruw Jones^{†}	Mike Matheny	Greg Maddux*^{†}	N/A	
2001	Todd Helton^{†}	Fernando Viña	Scott Rolen^{†}	Orlando Cabrera	Larry Walker^{†}	Jim Edmonds	Andruw Jones^{†}	Brad Ausmus	Greg Maddux*^{†}	N/A	
2002	Todd Helton^{†}	Fernando Viña	Scott Rolen^{†}	Édgar Rentería	Larry Walker^{†}	Jim Edmonds	Andruw Jones^{†}	Brad Ausmus	Greg Maddux*^{†}	N/A	
2003	Derrek Lee	Luis Castillo	Scott Rolen^{†}	Édgar Rentería	José Cruz Jr.	Jim Edmonds	Andruw Jones^{†}	Mike Matheny	Mike Hampton	N/A	
2004	Todd Helton^{†}	Luis Castillo	Scott Rolen^{†}	César Izturis	Steve Finley	Jim Edmonds	Andruw Jones^{†}	Mike Matheny	Greg Maddux*^{†}	N/A	
2005	Derrek Lee	Luis Castillo	Mike Lowell	Omar Vizquel	Bobby Abreu	Jim Edmonds	Andruw Jones^{†}	Mike Matheny	Greg Maddux*^{†}	N/A	
2006	Albert Pujols	Orlando Hudson	Scott Rolen^{†}	Omar Vizquel	Mike Cameron	Carlos Beltrán^{†}	Andruw Jones^{†}	Brad Ausmus	Greg Maddux*^{†}	N/A	
2007	Derrek Lee	Orlando Hudson	David Wright	Jimmy Rollins	Aaron Rowand & Jeff Francoeur	Carlos Beltrán^{†}	Andruw Jones^{†}	Russell Martin	Greg Maddux*^{†}	N/A	
2008	Adrián González	Brandon Phillips	David Wright	Jimmy Rollins	Nate McLouth	Carlos Beltrán^{†}	Shane Victorino	Yadier Molina	Greg Maddux*^{†}	N/A	
2009	Adrián González	Orlando Hudson	Ryan Zimmerman	Jimmy Rollins	Michael Bourn	Matt Kemp	Shane Victorino	Yadier Molina	Adam Wainwright	N/A	
2010	Albert Pujols	Brandon Phillips	Scott Rolen^{†}	Troy Tulowitzki	Michael Bourn	Carlos González	Shane Victorino	Yadier Molina	Bronson Arroyo	N/A	
2011	Joey Votto	Brandon Phillips	Plácido Polanco	Troy Tulowitzki	Gerardo Parra^{LF}	Matt Kemp^{CF}	Andre Ethier^{RF}	Yadier Molina	Clayton Kershaw	N/A	
2012	Adam LaRoche	Darwin Barney	Chase Headley	Jimmy Rollins	Carlos González^{LF}	Andrew McCutchen^{CF}	Jason Heyward^{RF}	Yadier Molina	Mark Buehrle	N/A	
2013	Paul Goldschmidt	Brandon Phillips	Nolan Arenado	Andrelton Simmons	Carlos González^{LF}	Carlos Gómez^{CF}	Gerardo Parra^{RF}	Yadier Molina	Adam Wainwright	N/A	
2014	Adrián González	DJ LeMahieu	Nolan Arenado	Andrelton Simmons	Christian Yelich^{LF}	Juan Lagares^{CF}	Jason Heyward^{RF}	Yadier Molina	Zack Greinke	N/A	
2015	Paul Goldschmidt	Dee Gordon	Nolan Arenado	Brandon Crawford	Starling Marte^{LF}	A. J. Pollock^{CF}	Jason Heyward^{RF}	Yadier Molina	Zack Greinke	N/A	
2016	Anthony Rizzo	Joe Panik	Nolan Arenado	Brandon Crawford	Starling Marte^{LF}	Ender Inciarte^{CF}	Jason Heyward^{RF}	Buster Posey	Zack Greinke	N/A	
2017	Paul Goldschmidt	DJ LeMahieu	Nolan Arenado	Brandon Crawford	Marcell Ozuna^{LF}	Ender Inciarte^{CF}	Jason Heyward^{RF}	Tucker Barnhart	Zack Greinke	N/A	
2018	Anthony Rizzo & Freddie Freeman	DJ LeMahieu	Nolan Arenado	Nick Ahmed	Corey Dickerson^{LF}	Ender Inciarte^{CF}	Nick Markakis^{RF}	Yadier Molina	Zack Greinke	N/A	
2019	Anthony Rizzo	Kolten Wong	Nolan Arenado	Nick Ahmed	David Peralta^{LF}	Lorenzo Cain^{CF}	Cody Bellinger^{RF}	J. T. Realmuto	Zack Greinke	N/A	
2020	Anthony Rizzo	Kolten Wong	Nolan Arenado	Javier Báez	Tyler O'Neill^{LF}	Trent Grisham^{CF}	Mookie Betts^{RF}	Tucker Barnhart	Max Fried	N/A	Chicago Cubs
2021	Paul Goldschmidt	Tommy Edman	Nolan Arenado	Brandon Crawford	Tyler O'Neill^{LF}	Harrison Bader^{CF}	Adam Duvall^{RF}	Jacob Stallings	Max Fried	N/A	St. Louis Cardinals
2022	Christian Walker	Brendan Rodgers	Nolan Arenado	Dansby Swanson	Ian Happ^{LF}	Trent Grisham^{CF}	Mookie Betts^{RF}	J. T. Realmuto	Max Fried	Brendan Donovan	St. Louis Cardinals
2023	Christian Walker	Nico Hoerner	Ke'Bryan Hayes	Dansby Swanson	Ian Happ^{LF}	Brenton Doyle^{CF}	Fernando Tatís Jr.^{RF}	Gabriel Moreno	Zack Wheeler	Ha-seong Kim	Milwaukee Brewers
2024	Christian Walker	Brice Turang	Matt Chapman	Ezequiel Tovar	Ian Happ^{LF}	Brenton Doyle^{CF}	Sal Frelick^{RF}	Patrick Bailey	Chris Sale	Jared Triolo	Milwaukee Brewers
2025	Matt Olson	Nico Hoerner	Ke'Bryan Hayes	Masyn Winn	Ian Happ^{LF}	Pete Crow-Armstrong^{CF}	Fernando Tatís Jr.^{RF}	Patrick Bailey	Logan Webb	Javier Sanoja	Chicago Cubs
2026	Matt Olson	Brice Turang	Alex Bregman	Geraldo Perdomo	Jackson Chourio^{LF}	Pete Crow-Armstrong^{CF}	Corbin Carroll^{RF}	Gabriel Moreno	Nolan McLean	Mauricio Dubón	Chicago Cubs

^LF won as a left fielder ^CF won as a center fielder ^RF won as a right fielder

== All-time Gold Glove Team ==
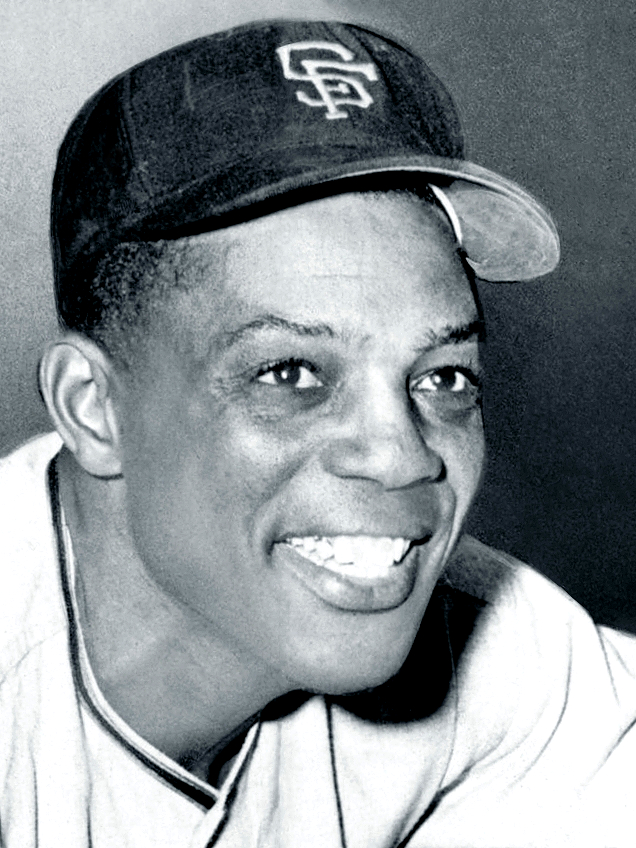
Hall of Fame centerfielder Willie Mays won 12 Gold Gloves and was elected to the joint MLB/Rawlings all-time team compiled in 2007, the 50th anniversary of the Gold Glove award

On February 20, 2007, Major League Baseball and Rawlings announced that an all-time Gold Glove Team would be named during the 50th anniversary of the first Gold Glove Awards. Rawlings asked 70 baseball reporters, former players, and former managers to select 50 names for the ballot, from an initial selection of 250 names. The team was selected by fans, who voted at the Rawlings Gold Glove website, at United States Postal Service offices, and at sporting goods stores. The results were announced at the 2007 Major League Baseball All-Star Game.

All-time Gold Glove Team members by position
First base	Wes Parker
Second base	Joe Morgan^{†}
Third base	Brooks Robinson*^{†}
Shortstop	Ozzie Smith*^{†}
Outfield	Willie Mays**^{†}
Outfield	Roberto Clemente**^{†}
Outfield	Ken Griffey Jr.^{†}
Catcher	Johnny Bench^{†}
Pitcher	Greg Maddux*^{†}

== Teammates ==
=== Middle infield duos ===
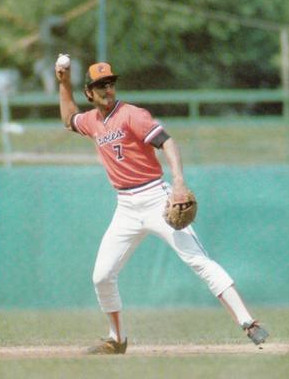
Mark Belanger (pictured) won multiple Gold Gloves at shortstop along with teammates Davey Johnson and Bobby Grich at second base.

In the history of the Gold Glove Award, there have been twelve double-play combinations, or pairs of middle infielders, that have won awards in the same year. Shortstops and second basemen depend upon each other for the majority of double plays. The most common type of double play occurs with a runner on first base and a ground ball hit towards the middle of the infield. The player fielding the ball (generally the shortstop or second baseman) throws to the fielder covering second base, who steps on the base before the runner from first arrives to force that runner out, and then throws the ball to the first baseman to force out the batter for the second out. Mark Belanger won four Gold Gloves with the Baltimore Orioles alongside winning partner Bobby Grich, and Joe Morgan paired with Dave Concepción for four combination wins with the Cincinnati Reds. The most recent teammates to accomplish the feat are Dansby Swanson and Nico Hoerner, who won with the Chicago Cubs in 2023.

Double-play combinations to win Gold Gloves for the same team in the same season
Shortstop	Second baseman	Team	Times won	Years	Ref(s)
Luis Aparicio^{†}	Nellie Fox^{†}	Chicago White Sox	2	1959–1960	
Gene Alley	Bill Mazeroski^{†}	Pittsburgh Pirates	2	1966–1967	
Jim Fregosi	Bobby Knoop	California Angels	1	1967	
Mark Belanger	Davey Johnson	Baltimore Orioles	2	1969, 1971	
Mark Belanger	Bobby Grich	Baltimore Orioles	4	1973–1976	
Dave Concepción	Joe Morgan^{†}	Cincinnati Reds	4	1974–1977	
Alan Trammell^{†}	Lou Whitaker	Detroit Tigers	2	1983–1984	
Omar Vizquel	Roberto Alomar*^{†}	Cleveland Indians	3	1999–2001	
Édgar Rentería	Fernando Viña	St. Louis Cardinals	1	2002	
Derek Jeter^{†}	Robinson Canó	New York Yankees	1	2010	
Brandon Crawford	Joe Panik	San Francisco Giants	1	2016	
Andrelton Simmons	Ian Kinsler (Note: Kinsler played 91 games at second base for the Angels before he was traded to the Boston Red Sox on July 30, 2018.)	Los Angeles Angels	1	2018	
Dansby Swanson	Nico Hoerner	Chicago Cubs	1	2023	

† = Hall of Fame

=== Batteries ===
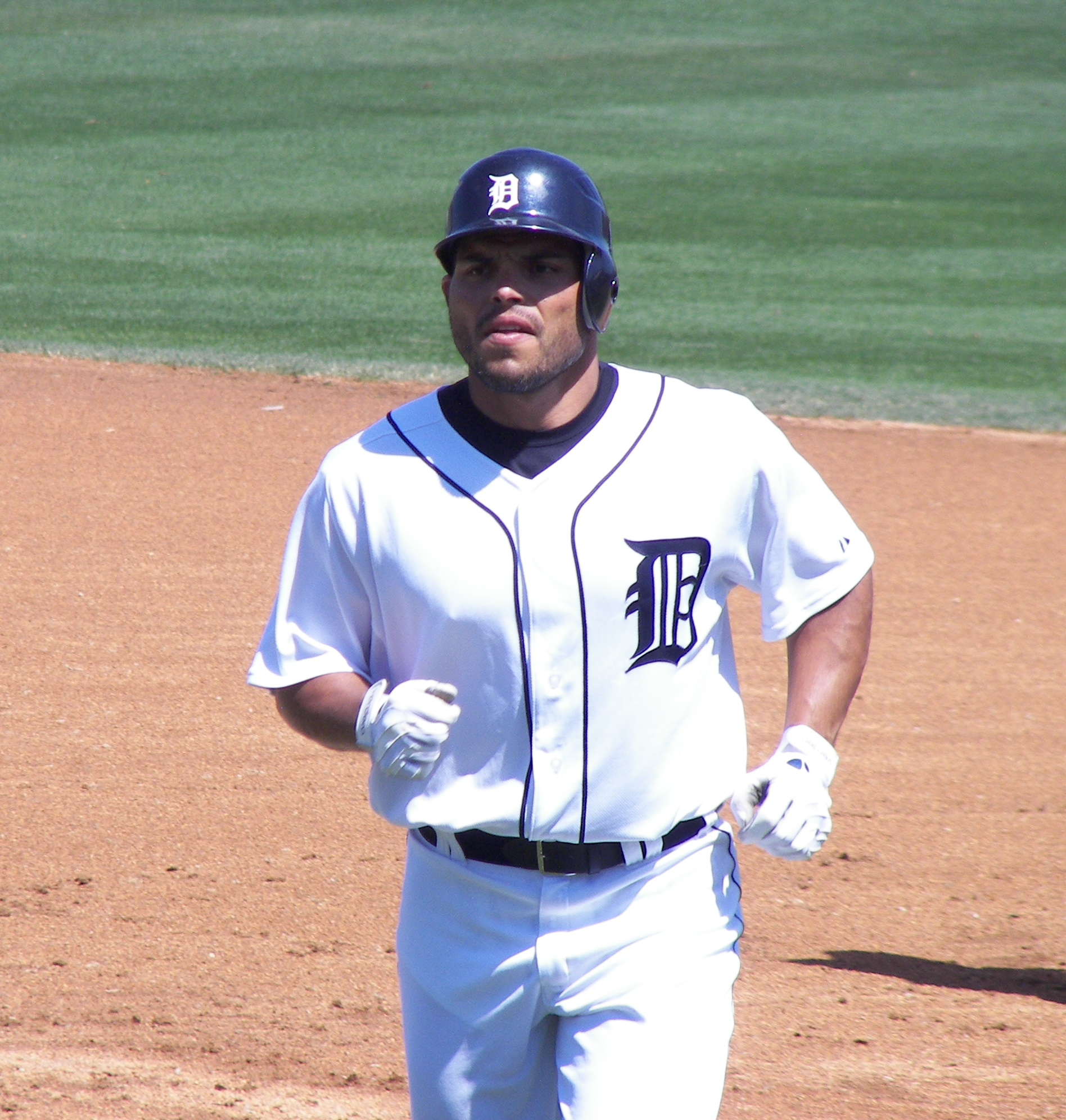
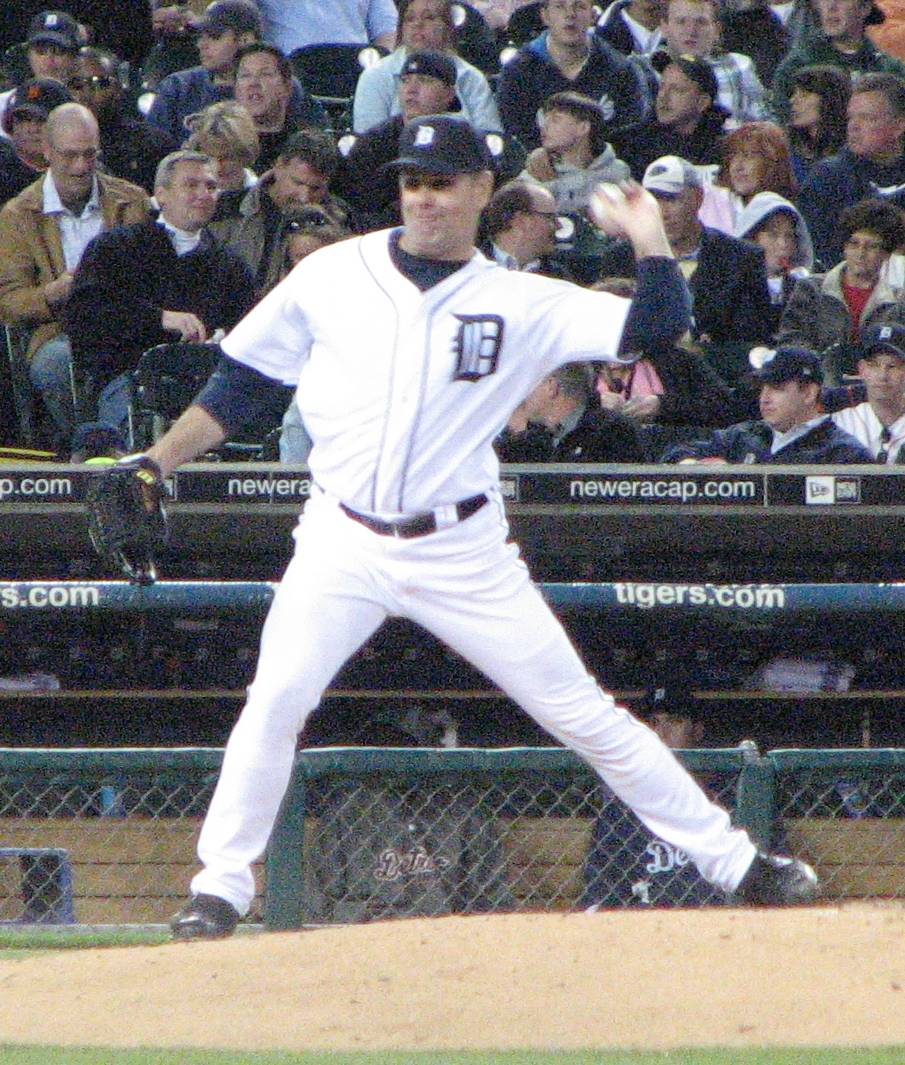
Iván Rodríguez and Kenny Rogers won Gold Gloves as batterymates in 2000 and 2006.

Since 1957, there have been six Gold Glove batteries. The pitcher and catcher, collectively known as the battery, are the only two players on the field involved in every pitch. In particular, the pitcher and catcher control the running game with tools such as pickoffs or the strength of the catcher's throwing arm. The first pitcher and catcher on the same team to win Gold Gloves in the same year were Jim Kaat and Earl Battey, with the Minnesota Twins in 1962. Only two pairs of batterymates have won Gold Gloves together more than once: Iván Rodríguez and Kenny Rogers won with the Texas Rangers in 2000, and again with the Detroit Tigers in 2006. Yadier Molina and Adam Wainwright matched the feat, winning in both 2009 and 2013.

Batterymates to win Gold Gloves for the same team in the same season
Pitcher	Catcher	Team	Times won	Years	Ref
Jim Kaat^{†}	Earl Battey	Minnesota Twins	1	1962	
Rick Reuschel	Tony Peña	Pittsburgh Pirates	1	1985	
Bret Saberhagen	Bob Boone	Kansas City Royals	1	1989	
Kenny Rogers	Iván Rodríguez*^{†}	Texas Rangers	2	2000	
Kenny Rogers	Iván Rodríguez*^{†}	Detroit Tigers	2	2006	
Adam Wainwright	Yadier Molina	St. Louis Cardinals	2	2009, 2013	
Logan Webb	Patrick Bailey	San Francisco Giants	1	2025	

== Platinum Glove Award ==
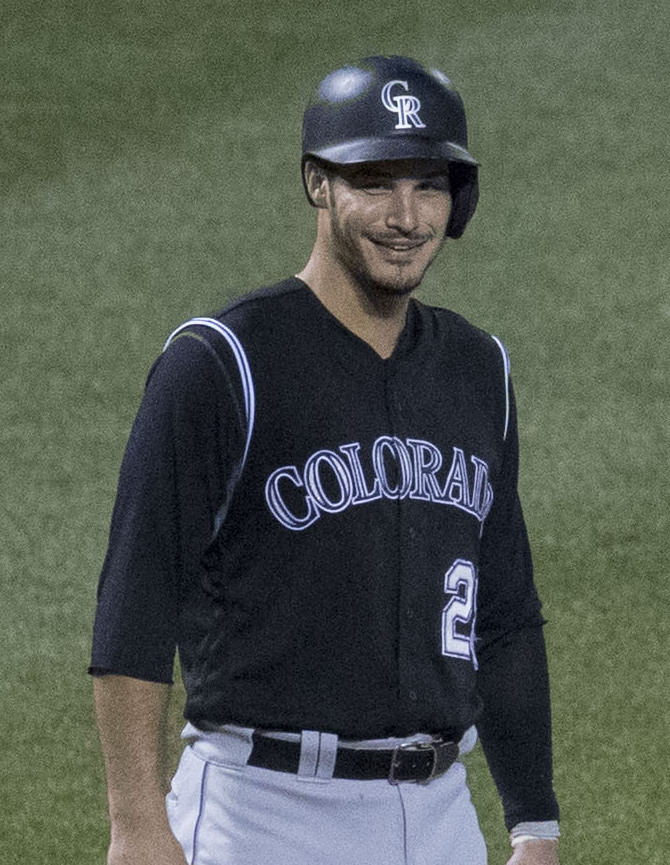
As of 2024, Nolan Arenado (with 6) has won the most Platinum Glove Awards of any player.

In 2011, Rawlings added an annual Platinum Glove Award awarded to the best defensive player in each league, as selected by fans from the year's Gold Glove winners. Numbers after a player's name indicate that he has won the award multiple times.

Year	American League			National League		
Year	Player	Team	Position	Player	Team	Position
2011	Adrián Beltré^{†}	Texas Rangers	3B	Yadier Molina	St. Louis Cardinals	C
2012	Adrián Beltré^{†} (2)	Texas Rangers	3B	Yadier Molina (2)	St. Louis Cardinals	C
2013	Manny Machado	Baltimore Orioles	3B	Andrelton Simmons	Atlanta Braves	SS
2014	Alex Gordon	Kansas City Royals	LF	Yadier Molina (3)	St. Louis Cardinals	C
2015	Kevin Kiermaier	Tampa Bay Rays	CF	Yadier Molina (4)	St. Louis Cardinals	C
2016	Francisco Lindor	Cleveland Indians	SS	Anthony Rizzo	Chicago Cubs	1B
2017	Byron Buxton	Minnesota Twins	CF	Nolan Arenado	Colorado Rockies	3B
2018	Matt Chapman	Oakland Athletics	3B	Nolan Arenado (2)	Colorado Rockies	3B
2019	Matt Chapman (2)	Oakland Athletics	3B	Nolan Arenado (3)	Colorado Rockies	3B
2020	Alex Gordon (2)	Kansas City Royals	LF	Nolan Arenado (4)	Colorado Rockies	3B
2021	Carlos Correa	Houston Astros	SS	Nolan Arenado (5)	St. Louis Cardinals	3B
2022	Jose Trevino	New York Yankees	C	Nolan Arenado (6)	St. Louis Cardinals	3B
2023	Andrés Giménez	Cleveland Guardians	2B	Fernando Tatís Jr.	San Diego Padres	RF
2024	Cal Raleigh	Seattle Mariners	C	Brice Turang	Milwaukee Brewers	2B
2025	Bobby Witt Jr.	Kansas City Royals	SS	Fernando Tatis Jr. (2)	San Diego Padres	RF
2026	Cody Bellinger	New York Yankees	LF	Pete Crow-Armstrong	Chicago Cubs	CF

== National Pro Fastpitch ==
In 2016, Rawlings announced it would begin awarding a gold glove annually to a female fastpitch softball player in the National Pro Fastpitch (NPF) league. NPF coaches and managers vote for a winner (excluding those on their respective teams). This award is in addition to the collegiate and high school awards added in 2007, the 50th anniversary of the inaugural Gold Glove Awards.

Gold Glove winners in National Pro Fastpitch
Year	Player	Team	Position	Ref
2016	AJ Andrews	Akron Racers	RF	
2017	Chelsea Goodacre	USSSA Pride	C	
2018	Jade Rhodes	Cleveland Comets	1B	
2019	Jessie Warren	USSSA Pride	3B	
2020	Season canceled due to COVID-19 pandemic			
2021	Season canceled due to COVID-19 pandemic and unavailability of home venues for teams(league folded in 2021)			

== See also ==
- Silver Slugger Award - the offensive counterpart to the award
- Wilson Defensive Player of the Year Award
- Esurance MLB Awards – Best Defensive Player
- Rawlings Woman Executive of the Year Award – a minor league award also presented by Rawlings
- Baseball awards § United States
