= Kirk Walker =

American softball coach

Biographical details
- Born: January 8, 1965 (age 61); Woodland Hills, California, U.S.

Coaching career (HC unless noted)
- 1984–1989: UCLA (grad. asst.)
- 1990–1994: UCLA (asst.)
- 1995–2012: Oregon State
- 2013–2022: UCLA (asst.)
- 2023–2024: UCLA (AHC)

Head coaching record
- Overall: 594–490–3 (.548)

Accomplishments and honors

Awards
- 2× Pac-10 Coach of the Year (1999, 2005)

Kirk Nathan Walker (born January 8, 1965) is an American former softball coach, currently serving as general manager for the Oklahoma City Spark of the Athletes Unlimited Softball League (AUSL). He previously served as the head coach for the Oregon State Beavers softball team, where he is the winningest softball coach in program history, and as an assistant coach for the UCLA Bruins softball team.

== Coaching career ==
Walker began his coaching career as an undergraduate assistant coach for the UCLA Bruins in 1984. He spent 11 years at UCLA where the Bruins won six Women's College World Series championships in 1984, 1985, 1988, 1989, 1990 and 1992.

Prior to the 1995 season, Walker was named head coach for the Oregon State Beavers softball team. In 1999, he led the Beavers to a 47–25 record, setting a program-record for the most wins, and advanced to NCAA Tournament for the first time in program history. Following the season he was named Pac-10 Coach of the Year and Speedline Pacific Region Co-Coaching Staff of the Year. In 2005 he led the Beavers to a 43–16 record, and their first-ever conference championship in program history and an automatic berth to the NCAA Tournament. The Pac-10 championship was the first regular-season title for any women's sports program in Oregon State history. Following the season he was named Pac-10 Coach of the Year. On March 1, 2009, Walker earned his 500th career win in a victory against Minnesota.

Walker served as the head coach at Oregon State for eighteen years, where he posted a 594–490–3 record, and eight seasons with at least 40 wins. He is the all-time winningest softball coach in program history and the fifth-winningest in Oregon State history regardless of sport. On August 7, 2012, Walker resigned as head coach of the Beavers to return to UCLA as an assistant coach. On August 12, 2022, Walker was promoted to associate head coach for the Bruins. He transitioned to director of softball administration in 2025.

On November 18, 2019, Walker was named head coach and assistant general manager for the California Commotion of National Pro Fastpitch. The team never played a game as the 2020 and 2021 seasons were cancelled due to the COVID-19 pandemic. On August 1, 2021, the NPF announced that due to a lack of revenue after cancelling the previous two seasons, it would be suspending operations.

== Later years ==
In November 2025, he was named the general manager for the Oklahoma City Spark of the Athletes Unlimited Softball League (AUSL).

== Honors ==
In August 2025, Walker was inducted into the LGBTQ Sports Hall of Fame. In December 2025, he was named a member of 2026 National Fastpitch Coaches Association Hall of Fame class, as a member of the trailblazer category.

== Personal life ==
Walker came out as gay to his Oregon State softball team in 2005, announcing he and his partner, Randy Baltimore, adopted a daughter named Ava. Because they had to register with a public agency, he did not want his players to learn from anyone else. He came out to the website Outsports in 2007. He was the first openly gay male coach in NCAA Division I history.

== Head coaching record ==
Record table
Season	Team	Overall	Conference	Standing	Postseason
Oregon State (Pacific-10/Pac-12 Conference) (1995–2012)
1995	Oregon State	13–41	4–24	7th	
1996	Oregon State	15–35	3–22	8th	
1997	Oregon State	29–34–1	6–21	8th	
1998	Oregon State	27–28	8–20	8th	
1999	Oregon State	47–25	14–14	4th	NCAA Regionals
2000	Oregon State	40–21–1	7–13	6th	NCAA Regionals
2001	Oregon State	44–24	10–10	5th	NCAA Regionals
2002	Oregon State	40–25	7–14	7th	NCAA Regionals
2003	Oregon State	36–31	5–16	8th	NCAA Regionals
2004	Oregon State	44–28	4–17	7th	NCAA Regionals
2005	Oregon State	43–16	13–8	3rd	NCAA Regionals
2006	Oregon State	43–16	10–10	5th	Women's College World Series
2007	Oregon State	41–23	10–11	5th	NCAA Regionals
2008	Oregon State	28–31	6–15	7th	
2009	Oregon State	25–30	4–17	7th	
2010	Oregon State	24–31	4–17	8th	
2011	Oregon State	19–28	2–19	8th	
2012	Oregon State	36–23	9–14	6th	NCAA Regionals
Oregon State:		594–490–3 (.548)	126–282 (.309)		
Total:		594–490–3 (.548)			
National champion Postseason invitational champion Conference regular season champion Conference regular season and conference tournament champion Division regular season champion Division regular season and conference tournament champion Conference tournament champion
