= 1997 Women's Pro Fastpitch season =

1997 WPF Season
- League: Women's Professional Fastpitch
- Sport: softball
- Duration: May 30, 1997 - August 1997
- Number of teams: 6
- TV partner(s): ESPN2

1997 WPF Draft

WPF Championship
- Champions: Orlando Wahoos
- Runners-up: Virginia Roadsters
- Finals MVP: Debbie Doom; Orlando Wahoos

WPF seasons
- 1998 →

The 1997 Women's Pro Fastpitch season was the first season of women's professional softball for Women's Pro Fastpitch (WPF). The season began on May 30, 1997 and finished in a championship series between the two highest finishers.

== Teams, cities and stadiums ==
Team	City	Stadium
Carolina Diamonds	Charlotte, North Carolina	Robert and Mariam Hayes Stadium at D.L. Phillips Softball Complex
Durham Dragons	Durham, North Carolina	Durham Athletic Park
Georgia Pride	Lithonia, Georgia	Southeast Athletic Complex
Orlando Wahoos	Winter Park, Florida	Alfond Stadium at Rollins College
Tampa Bay FireStix	Tampa, Florida	Red McEwen Field
Virginia Roadsters	Hampton, Virginia	War Memorial Stadium

== Milestones and Events ==
Launching the WPF

The WPF was the second attempt at an American professional women's fastpitch softball league. The previous league, the International Women's Professional Softball Association, lasted from 1976-1979.

In January 1989, former Utah State pitcher Jane Cowles, approached her parents, Sage and John, owners of Cowles Media Company, with a plan for a professional women's fastpitch league. They believed there was potential in the idea, and began a period of research. They raised funds to establish the National Fastpitch Association (NFA) in 1991 in Boulder, Colorado.

In June 1993, the NFA held an exhibition series of two teams of former collegiate fastpitch players around the country. After evaluating the success of the exhibitions, the NFA focused research on possible markets, investors and sponsors. NFA's moved their offices to Minneapolis/St. Paul where Jay Cowles, Jane's brother, become CEO.

On January 19, 1994, Jay Cowles officially announced the formation of the National Fastpitch Association. Plans to begin league play in 1996 with an exhibition tour scheduled for the summer of 1995 was announced.

Making the game's national debut on August 11, 1994, the Decatur Pride and the California Commotion faced off at Borg Warner Stadium in Decatur, Illinois, later broadcast by ESPN2. By late fall of 1994, planning for an exhibition Tour was underway, and NFA changed its name to Women's Professional Fastpitch (WPF). In February 1995, Mitzi Swentzell, former Executive Vice President of the Denver Nuggets, assumed the position of President and CEO.

From June 15 to July 13, the 1995 WPF Tour featured two All-Star teams, called the Blaze and the Storm, that played in 16 cities and eight states.

WPF held its first draft at its Minneapolis offices on October 31, 1995. Swentzell announced that the league would play its first season in the summer of 1997. WPF offices moved to Denver, and another draft, consisting of 1997 college seniors, was held March 20.

After more than eight years of planning, the WPF played its first games May 30, 1997. Opening games were played in Durham and Orlando. The Virginia Roadsters claimed the first win in league history, defeating the Durham Dragons 2-1 in a broadcast on ESPN2. Games that season were also shown on the Sunshine Network, Fox Sports South and WPEN-LP.

Teams played a 72-game schedule, with the winners of each half meeting in a championship series. Each team had a salary cap of $74,000 for their 15-player rosters. AT&T Wireless was the main sponsor, promising $4 million over three seasons. The league owned everything from vending rights to player contracts to franchises.

== Player Acquisition ==
=== College Draft ===
NewsOK.com reported that, in anticipation of the launch of the WPF, a draft was held in October, 1995. Among those drafted included Michelle Smith and Lisa Fernandez. NewsOK.com also reported that the draftees would be assigned to teams in the Midwest and the West Coast and that the WPF would begin play in 1996. As no teams were on the West Coast and the league launched in 1997, these detail were premature.

A 1997 draft of college seniors was held March 20.

== League standings ==
Team	GP	W	L	T	Pct.	GB
Orlando Wahoos	70	57	12	1	.826	-
Virginia Roadsters	70	33	37	0	.471	24.5
Tampa Bay Firestix	70	31	39	0	.443	26.5
Durham Dragons	70	30	39	1	.435	27
Carolina Diamonds	70	29	41	0	.414	28.5
Georgia Pride	70	29	41	0	.414	28.5

== WPF Championship ==
The 1997 WPF Championship Series was a best-of-five series between the Orlando Wahoos and the Virginia Roadsters. The Wahoos won both halves of the season, with the Roadsters finishing behind them.

1997 WPF Championship Orlando Wahoos defeat Virginia Roadsters 3–1
Game	Score	Series (ORL-VIR)
1	Orlando Wahoos 3, Virginia Roadsters 1	1–0
2	Orlando Wahoos 3, Virginia Roadsters 4	1–1
3	Orlando Wahoos 10, Virginia Roadsters 3	2-1
4	Orlando Wahoos 11, Virginia Roadsters 1	3-1

1997 WPF Championship Series MVP
Player	Club
Debbie Doom	Orlando Wahoos

== Annual awards ==
Award	Player	Team
Most Valuable Player	Sarah Dawson	Orlando Wahoos
Pitcher of the Year	Sarah Dawson	Orlando Wahoos
Hitter of the Year	Liz Mizera	Orlando Wahoos
Defensive Player of the Year	Rashunda Taylor	Orlando Wahoos
Home Run Champions	Sue Lewis-Newton	Orlando Wahoos
Home Run Champions	Liz Mizera	Orlando Wahoos
Home Run Champions	Trisha Reinhardt	Durham Dragons
Coach of the Year	Lu Harris	Orlando Wahoos

== See also ==
- List of professional sports leagues
- List of professional sports teams in the United States and Canada
