= Sashel Palacios =

Mexican-American softball player

Personal information
- Full name: Sashel Aitiana Palacios Barajas
- National team: Mexico
- Born: September 17, 1995 (age 31) Chula Vista, California, US
- Height: 5 ft 3 in (160 cm)

Sport
- Sport: Softball
- Position: Catcher
- College team: Arizona State (2014–2017)
- Team: Chicago Bandits (2018) Cleveland Comets (2019) Athletes Unlimited (2020–present)
Medal record
Women's softball
Representing Mexico
Central American and Caribbean Games
Silver medal – second place	2018 Barranquilla	Team competition

Sashel Aitiana Palacios Barajas (born September 9, 1995) is an American softball player. A catcher of Mexican descent, after playing college softball for Arizona State she embarked on a professional career in 2018. She also helped the Mexico national team qualify for the 2020 Summer Olympics, which finished the tournament in fourth place.

== Early years ==
Palacios was born on September 9, 1995, in Chula Vista, California. Her father, Francisco "Kiko", is a Tijuana native who was born and raised in Mexico. After coming to the United States as a teenager, he became a three-time All-San Diego Section catcher at Castle Park High School before playing at local Southwestern College. He was drafted twice: first by the Cleveland Indians in the 1992 MLB draft and then by the Detroit Tigers in the 1993 MLB draft. However, lacking the financial support to pursue a professional career, he never signed a contract. He did, however, play for the Mexico national baseball team. Her mother, Soida, is a California native with Mexican roots who played softball growing up.

Palacios tried many sports in her childhood, including volleyball, basketball and soccer, but ultimately chose to focus on softball under the tutelage of her father. She played in the Bonita Valley League from 2003 to 2009. She then attended Otay Ranch High School in Chula Vista, where she was a three-time Mesa League MVP on the softball team. As a sophomore, she batted .460 with a .505 on-base percentage along with 34 runs scored and 43 runs batted in (RBI). As a junior, she earned second team all-section and second-team all-CIF Division II honors. As a senior in 2013, she had a .523 batting average, earning first-team all-section honors as well as a selection to the Cal-Hi Sports all-state third-team. She was also named MVP of the annual Hilltop Tournament, recording three hits and four RBI in their championship game victory over Santana High School. In November 2012, she signed an early letter of intent to play at Arizona State University.

Palacios also lettered twice in volleyball in high school and played travel softball with Team Muzino and the San Diego Renegades. She graduated from Otay Ranch with a 4.3 GPA.

== Career ==
=== College career ===
Palacios played Division I college softball for the Arizona State Sun Devils from 2014 to 2017. She helped the Sun Devils reach the NCAA tournament all four years, including a trip to the Super Regionals in 2014. She initially served as a backup catcher to Amber Freeman, appearing in only eight games as a freshman. She later claimed to have "[fallen] out of love" with the game around this time, even contemplating quitting the team altogether. However, she did record five hits in eleven at-bats. After spending the summer playing with the Mexico national team, she returned for her second year.

As a sophomore in 2015, Palacios finished fifth on the team with a .323 batting average and third on the team with a .459 on-base percentage, along with 20 RBI and three home runs. She went the entire regular season without an error, earning Pac-12 All-Defensive and NFCA Third-Team All-West Region honors. She hit a home run in their Pac-12 home opener against California on March 20. On May 1, she went three-for-three with three RBI in a 20–0 mercy rule victory over Stanford. The following day, she went four-for-four with an RBI in another mercy rule win over Stanford. She also became known this season for videobombing her teammates, and even head coach Craig Nicholson, in post-game interviews.

As a junior in 2016, Palacios split playing time behind the plate with senior Katee Aguirre after the graduation of four-year starter Amber Freeman. In 54 games played, she batted .311 with 26 RBI and five home runs. On February 20, she hit a two-run home run during a 6–0 defeat of Illinois State at the Littlewood Classic. Overall she went four-for-10 with five RBI and a walk as the Sun Devils went undefeated in the tournament. After a cold streak of two hits in 12 games, she had two home runs and three RBI in a 12–9 loss to Washington on April 10.

As a senior in 2017, she appeared in all 53 games, finishing third on the team in batting average (.322), RBI (40) and home runs (10). She hit a grand slam in a 12–1 win over Nebraska on March 10. After amassing 17 RBI through the first six weeks of play, she was named the Pac-12 Player of the Week in late March after batting .533 with six home runs and 11 RBI in a five-game stretch. She recorded two home runs and four RBI in a doubleheader against New Mexico State on March 22. She hit another homer in a 8–0 win against Oregon State on March 25. In the second game of the series the next day, Palacios went three-for-four with two home runs and six RBI, including the walk-off grand slam to seal the 11–0 mercy rule win. Finally, she hit a two-run homer in the third game of the Oregon State series on March 27. On May 5 and 6, she recorded two home runs and five RBI in back-to-back wins over California. At the conclusion of the season she earned first-team All-Pac-12 and Pac-12 All-Defensive honors.

=== Professional career ===
On November 21, 2017, Palacios signed her first professional contract, a one-year deal with the Chicago Bandits of National Pro Fastpitch (NPF) ahead of the 2018 NPF season. She made her pro debut on June 6 and was named the NPF Rookie of the Week after batting .556 in their six-game opening week series against the Aussie Spirit. She went 3 for 4 with three RBI and her first career home run in their June 10 victory over the Spirit, earning player of the game honors. Palacios batted .275 with six RBI and one home run on the season. She spent the following year with the Cleveland Comets, who partnered with the Mexico national team, and hit .217 with 13 RBI during the 2019 NPF season.

In 2020 Palacios took part in the inaugural six-week season of Athletes Unlimited Softball, an experimental player-run league without coaches or owners where team rosters are shuffled weekly via a draft. Instead of team standings, players are ranked on a leaderboard based on their individual performances. She recorded one home run, five RBI and nine walks, tallying 670 points overall. (Note: Players are awarded 10 points for singles, 20 for doubles, 30 for triples, 40 for home runs, 10 for stolen bases, 10 for sacrifice fly/bunts, 8 for walks and 8 for hit by pitches. 10 points are deducted for getting caught stealing base. Players also get 50 points for team wins and 10 when they win an inning. Additionally, three MVPs will be voted on after every game by players and fans for 60, 40 and 20 points.) Her sole home run came on the last day of the season.

Palacios was announced as a returning player for the 2021 Athletes Unlimited season. She hit a home run for Team Warren in her second game and was voted "MVP 2" by the players and fans (as the second-best player of the game). Shortly thereafter she earned "MVP 3" honors in a week 3 defeat to Team Osterman. In her last game of the season, she broke a scoreless tie with a fifth inning home run to help Team Jaquish defeat Team Eberle 6–2, earning "MVP 2" honors. In total, she recorded seven hits, five RBI and two home runs for a total of 934 individual points on the season.

=== International career ===
The summer after Palacios's freshman year at Arizona State, during which she thought about quitting the sport, her father informed her that the Mexican Softball Federation was allowing Mexican-American players to try out for the national team. After some initial hesitation, she began training for the opportunity and eventually earned a spot on the roster. Her first international competition was the 2014 World Cup of Softball in Irvine, California, and she credits the experience for rekindling her love of the game. She also joined the team for the 2015 World Cup of Softball the following summer, driving in a run against Argentina. Palacios played in the 2017 Canada Cup, where she recorded seven hits, four RBI and a home run in seven games. Later that year, she participated in the Pan American Championships, where Mexico finished second and secured a bid to the 2019 Pan American Games. She also won a silver medal with the team at the 2018 Central American and Caribbean Games, with their only loss coming in the championship game after extra innings. At the 2018 Women's Softball World Championship the following month, Palacios drove in the first run of Mexico's 2–0 victory over the Philippines. Four days later, on the last day of group play, she drove in the first two runs of their 4–3 defeat of Chinese Taipei. Mexico finished the tournament in sixth place.

Palacios was one of 12 American-born players included on the Mexico roster for the 2019 Pan American Games. She hit a grand slam in their opening game, a 9–0 victory over the host team Peru, but they ultimately failed to medal after being eliminated in the semifinals. A few weeks after the disappointing Pan American Games campaign, Palacios helped her team achieve a surprise first-place finish at the 2019 WBSC Americas Olympic Qualifier. They defeated the host nation, Canada, by a 2–1 score in the super round to secure Mexico's first ever Olympic berth in softball, a victory which Palacios called the highlight of her career. She scored the game-tying run in the fifth inning after leading off with a single. In preparation for the Olympics, she joined the team for the 2020 Australia Pacific Cup, where they finished in third place. At the Tokyo Olympics, Palacios recorded hits in wins against Italy and Australia. Mexico lost the bronze medal game to Canada.

== Personal life ==
Palacios has two younger siblings: her sister Sharlize, who plays softball at Arizona, and her brother Sabian. The two sisters played against each other for the first time in April 2021, when the Mexico national team faced Arizona in an exhibition game at Rita Hillenbrand Memorial Stadium. In the game, Sashel hit the game-winning solo home run in the seventh inning for the 3–2 victory.

Palacios earned her bachelor's degree in family and human development in the spring of 2017 and was named an All-Pac-12 Academic honorable mention. She earned several dean's list distinctions and was named to the CoSIDA Academic All-District softball team as a senior. She later returned to Arizona State to pursue her master's degree in higher and postsecondary education. She took the opportunity to serve as a graduate assistant coach during the 2018 season and finished her studies in 2019.
