= Kamalani Dung =

American softball player

Xeana Kamalani Dung
Personal information
- Nickname: Kama
- National team: Puerto Rican Women's Softball National Team
- Born: Xeana Kamalani Dung Waianae, Hawaii, United States
- Education: UC Berkeley
- Height: 5 ft 7 in (1.70 m)
- Spouse: N/A

Sport
- Sport: Softball
- Position: Pitcher
- University team: California Golden Bears, Fresno State Bulldogs
- League: Athletes Unlimited Softball League

Achievements and titles
- World finals: 2022 World Games, 2020 Tokyo Olympic Qualifiers, 2019 Pan American Games, 2019 WBSC World Cup, 2019 Canada Cup, 2018 WBSC World Championships, 2018 CACG, 2018 USA International Cup, 2018 WBSC World Cup
- Highest world ranking: WBSC (PUR) #2
- Personal bests: Third Team All-American, 2x All-Region Team, 3x All-Conference, Top 10 Names in College Softball, Cal Newcomer of the Year, MW Conference Pitcher of the Year, MW Conference Season Record Holder Strikeouts
Medal record
Women's softball
Representing Puerto Rico
Central American and Caribbean Games
Gold medal – first place	2018 Barranquilla	Team competition
Pan American Games
Bronze medal – third place	2019 Lima	Team competition

Xeana Kamalani Dung (born March 4, 1997), also known as Kama Dung, is an American right-handed professional softball pitcher, model, media personality, and entrepreneur from Waianae, Hawaii. As a right-handed pitcher, she has represented the Puerto Rican national team in international competition, through 2 Olympic and World Championship cycles. She has been ranked as high as No. 2 globally, and was part of Puerto Rico’s first gold medal in over 20 years. Dung, notably threw a combined perfect game at the 2020 Summer Olympics Qualifier where she also led the team in wins, strikeouts, and ERA.

She has competed at the professional and international levels, including in the historic debut season of Athletes Unlimited Pro Softball League formerly AUSL All-Star Cup She is recognized as the first professional softball player or pitcher from Hawaii to compete in the league.

At the collegiate level, Dung lead no.12 Cal as the ace. She began her career with the then no.15 Fresno State Bulldogs, where she was named Mountain West Conference Pitcher of the Year, was part of the 2016 Conference Championship-winning team, and holds the Mountain West single-season strikeout and school win streak record (23). She later transferred to the California Golden Bears as starting pitcher in the Pac-12 Conference, where she was named Pac-12 Conference Newcomer of the Year, earned Softball America All-American Third Team honors, and was recognized among the Top 10 names in collegiate softball in 2019. Dung's career expanded into a historic professional and international journey, establishing her career in professional and international sports.

Beyond athletics, Dung has built a career in media and business. She has worked as a model, actress, TV Host, and ESPN analyst, and is noted to have founded and contributed to multiple business ventures.

== Personal life and early education ==
Born and raised in Waianae, Hawaii. Her parents are Honey Rodrigues and Lance Dung. Her younger brother is Lancen Dung. She is of Native Hawaiian, Puerto Rican, White, and Chinese descent.

Dung attended high school at Kamehameha Schools.

Dung started playing competitive softball in Hawaii around the age of 10. She is a self-taught pitcher who learned to throw pitches unconventionally from YouTube. Called the 'YouTube' pitcher after coaches learning that she had no prior professional pitching lessons. Her early life and background have been profiled in local media coverages.

=== High school ===
Dung was a four-year varsity starter and captain at Kamehameha Kapalama High School. A four-year varsity athlete at Kamehameha-Kapalama High School in Honolulu, Hawai’i. Dung logged an ERA of 0.82 with 86 strikeouts, seven shutouts and an 11–1 record during her senior campaign. Dung led the team as ace pitcher and captain and acquired Three Division I conference championships and OC. Dung led the state in strikeouts and ERA, and paced the league in batting average and doubles. Additionally, she competed for the travel ball teams Mizuno/OC Batbusters and Mililani Prep- Hawai’i.

Dung signed to the Fresno State university.

== Fresno State ==
Dung majored in business administration.

=== Freshman ===
Dung made a debut as a D1 collegiate athlete in the NCAA on October 22, 2015, in an exhibition game against the professional team USSSA Pride at the Margie Wright Diamond.

In the 2016 season Dung went on to become one of the two starting pitchers as a freshman and helped her team to a Mountain West conference Championship, while being a part of one of the most dominant teams in MW history. That year Fresno State held a No.17 ranking nationally in RPI and had a nation-leading 23-game win streak that set a new school record. Dung was undefeated in conference play and recorded her first post-season regional appearance and save.

=== Sophomore ===
In 2017, Dung earned the All-Region Third Team. The prestigious Mountain West Pitcher of the Year award. All-MW 1st Team. MW Pitcher of the Week in back-to-back weeks (May 2 & May 9). Dung currently holds the All-Time Mountain West Conference record for most Batters Struck Out by a sophomore in a single season with 99. She also ranks top 5 in All-Time MW Games Pitched in a single-season with 13, and Games started in a single-season with 17. She threw a MW-best 9 shutouts in 31 complete games in 2017.

After throwing back-to-back shutouts against Indiana and Purdue during the first two games of the 2017 season, Dung was named ace of the Bulldog's squad and helped Fresno State to their then No. 21 ranking nationally. She later went on to pace national stats and lead the Mountain West in every major pitching category. Dung went 25–13 with a 2.17 ERA, allowed opposing hitters a .216 average, with 202 strikeouts in 238.1 innings and pitched 8 shutouts that season.

Dung earned a spot on the 2017 Puerto Vallarta College Challenge All-Tournament Team after going 2–2 with a 2.90 ERA and 16 strikeouts in 19.1 innings, throwing the only no-hitter of the tournament and the first no-hitter of her career. On February 17, 2017, Dung threw the 73rd no-hitter in Fresno State history during a 9–0 victory over Florida Gulf Coast at the Puerto Vallarta College Challenge.

She appeared in 44 games, including 38 starts. She threw 31 complete games, including a MW-best nine shutouts, and went 26–15 with 218 strikeouts in 254.1 innings.

2017 Stats Overview

Category	Total	Conference Rank	National Rank (NCAA DI)
Wins	26	1st	14th
Strikeouts	218	1st	24th
Shutouts	9	1st	17th
ERA	2.23	1st	Top 100
Innings Pitched	254.1	1st	12th

== University of California, Berkeley ==
Dung transferred in 2017 to UC Berkeley. Dung majored in sociology.

=== Junior ===
As a junior, Dung made her debut in the Pac-12 Conference for Cal. The Cal Golden Bears were highest No.15 ranking nationally that year.

Dung quickly found her place as an ace pitcher during her first season with the bears. She made 33 appearances with 27 starts and ranked through the top 10 in all major pitching categories in the PAC 12: ERA (1.96), wins (19), batters struck out (186), innings pitched (160.2), opposing batting average (.181). She struck out a career-best 15 batters against Fordham. Dung also threw the first perfect game for the Golden Bears in almost a decade, being the first perfect game since 2010, and the first perfect game of her career, during her first collegiate appearance in Hawaii while striking out 12 against UTEP in March. She was nominated Most Valuable Pitcher on the Malihini Kipa Aloha All-Tournament Team after playing the University of Hawaii. 2018 Conference Newcomer of the Year Awardee.

Helped Cal secure a top 20 national seed heading into the NCAA tournament.

2017 Stats Overview

Category	Statistic	Pac-12 Conference Rank	National (NCAA DI) Rank
Hits Allowed per 7 IP	4.62	Top 10	31st
Opposing Batting Avg	.181	Top 5	31st
Shutouts	7	Top 5	Top 20
Strikeouts	186	Top 5	Top 50
ERA	1.96	Top	Top 20
Wins	19	Top 10	Top 30

=== Senior ===
As a senior, Dung led the Cal Golden Bears to a peak No.12 ranking nationally that year.

Dung was selected to the NFCA All-Region Third Team for the second time in her career. She also earned All-Conference honors being selected to the All-Pac-12 Conference Second Team. Softball America Top Softball Performances of the Week and Softball America All-American. Ranked 10 in Top 25 Names in College Softball. Dung was predicted to be drafted to the Aussie Peppers of Mankato, Minnesota by FloSoftball.

She led the Golden Bears to their first top 25 wins since 2017 against No.21 James Madison University and also silenced one of the nations best offenses at the time by pitching a one-hitter through the first 5 innings in the Bears' upset against the No. 22 Arizona State Sun Devils. Dung gave Cal its first top 5 win of the last few years as she pitched a gem shutting out the No.5/No.1 Arizona Wildcats for the first time since 2012, ending the Wildcats 21-game winning streak with one of the most potent home run hitting lineups in the nation. In March Dung pitched a complete game against No.1 and eventual WCWS Champions UCLA allowing no earned runs and four hits. Dung collected the Bears' win against OSU allowing one run and four strikeouts in 5 innings. On February 22 Dung struck out 12 batters and allowed only two hits in a vital 1–0 victory over Duke University. - earning her national recognition as one of the top 9 performances in softball for that week.

Dung pitched a complete-game shutout against No. 1 ranked Arizona, ending their 21-game winning streak. She remains the only pitcher to shut out that potent home-run-hitting lineup during the 2019 season.

Final Hawaii Appearance: In her final collegiate games in her home state, Dung threw a five-inning shutout with 8 strikeouts in a 14-0 win over the University of Hawaii, reflecting on the journey from "the YouTube pitcher" to a hometown hero.

== Professional and international career ==
In 2020, Dung drafted to play professionally with California Commotion in the National Pro Fastpitch with Los Angeles based and the Chicago based Athletes Unlimited Softball league. Dung has also played for the city of Juncos in 2018 for the Puerto Rican Higher League.

=== Puerto Rican National Team and Professional League ===
==== 2018 ====
Because Dung is partially Puerto Rican, she was invited to try out for the 2018 Puerto Rico Women's National Softball Team. Dung was recorded on the roster for the 2018 U.S. International Cup, 2018 Central American and Caribbean Games, and the 2018 Women's Softball World Championship Tournament. Dung struck out eight in a 1-hit shutout during Puerto Rico's victory over South Africa in the World Championships in August. At the 2018 Central American and Caribbean Games in Barranquilla, Colombia, the Puerto Rican Women's National Softball Team took home the gold medal for the first time in over 20 years.

==== 2019 ====
Dung was selected to the roster for the 2019 World Cup of Softball, 2019 Canada Cup, 2019 Pan American Games, and 2019 Tokyo 2020 Americas Olympic Qualifier. In the 2019 World Cup Dung collected 3 of the team's 4 wins against Philippines, Chinese Taipei, and No.5 Mexico. Dung and Puerto Rico won the bronze medal at the 2019 Pan American Games in Lima, Peru. Competed in the Tokyo 2020 Olympic Qualifier in Surrey, Canada where she led the tournament in wins, collecting 3 of the team's 5 wins. Led her team with 18 strikeouts in 8.2 innings which also ranked in the top 5 of the tournament, and also held a 0.81 ERA.

Summer Olympics Qualifier

On Aug 26, 2019 In a dominant 13–0 victory over Guatemala during the Olympic Qualifier, Dung was the winning pitcher in a combined five-inning perfect game.

Dung allowed 0 earned runs with 7 strike outs to secure Puerto Rico's 10-0 win over Cuba.

Triple Crown Performance: For the tournament, she led Puerto Rico in wins (3), ERA (0.81), and strikeouts (18)

International Season Highlights

Tournament	Stat/Achievement	Highlight
2020 Summer Olympics Qualifier	3 Wins (1st)	Led tournament in wins; earned 3 of PUR’s 5 total victories.
	18 Strikeouts (1st)	Amassed 18 Ks in only 8.2 innings (Top 5 in tournament) and led PUR
	0.81 ERA (1st)	Led PUR in lowest ERA
	Combined Perfect Game	Combined perfect game at the qualifier against Guatemala.
WBSC World Cup of Softball	3 Wins	Collected 3 of tournaments 4 wins against the Philippines, Chinese Taipei, and No. 5 ranked Mexico.
Pan American Games	Bronze Medal	Key part of the rotation that reached the podium in Lima, Peru.
Canada Cup	Roster Selection	Continued her heavy workload against top-10 international teams.

2020

Dung was drafted to the inaugural roster of the Athletes Unlimited Softball League, with 10 game appearances and 2 starts. Dung was highlighted as a face of the league and rookie to watch. Recording 16 strikeouts in 17.0 innings.

Accumulated 874 total points during the inaugural Athletes Unlimited season.

2022

In 2022, Kamalani Dung participated in the 2022 World Games as a member of the Puerto Rico Women's National Softball Team. The right-handed pitcher and was a key part of the team's efforts of No. 5 World Ranking at the games held in Birmingham, Alabama. Dung also played professionally with Athletes Unlimited in their AUX Softball Season. Dung started against world No. 8 Australia, finishing with a 1.91 ERA

2023-2025

Dung periodically stepped away from professional competition to focus on national business and media ventures. During this time, she pursued opportunities in business, acting and fashion, including invites to the 2023 Grammy Awards, 2024 NBA All-Star Events, and completed a 2025 business education program at Harvard Business School.

2026

Dung currently plays professionally in the United States for the Athletes Unlimited Professional Sports League, listed in the 2026 player pool and for the Puerto Rican National Team .

Dung has also played for the city Veracrus, Mexico as one of the poster names in the LMS, where minor injuries delayed her season, and the city of Juncos in the Puerto Rican Higher League.

Dung was listed as a starting pitcher for the Puerto Rican National Team in a historical series played in Puerto Rico at Hiram Bithorn Stadium against Pro Softball League Champions Atlanta Smoke.

== Media & Awards ==
Media & Fashion

Starting in 2020, Dung was featured in talk show interviews and national podcasts covering her sports career, background, and business ventures.

In 2020, Dung was one of two featured athletes in the Athletes Unlimited "Going Pro Series," spotlighting the inaugural season of the professional softball league. Broadcast on YouTube and ESPN.

In 2022, Kamalani Dung attended the 64th Annual Grammy Awards in Las Vegas, wearing an ensemble designed by Kini Zamora.

In 2021, Dung made her first appearance as an ESPN Sports Analyst. Dung was offered full time roles as a TV Host but turned them down to pursue her businesses and foundation.

Dung's 2022 mini-documentary was created by Toyota and featured Dung as the star of the series that aired on TV and YouTube highlighting notable people of Hawaii. Through this series, she shares how she overcame adversity, embraced her community, and now gives back—playing “for the underserved” and inspiring future generations.

In 2023, Dung walked a number of runways including New Zealand Fashion Week in Auckland, New Zealand and Hawaii Swim Week in Hilo, Hawaii.

Dung is credited for her on screen role as “Napua” in the 2024 “Who’s That Girl?” award-winning music video.

Impact Awards & Appearances

Dung was presented with an honorary certificate at Honolulu Hale in November 2022, acknowledging her outstanding achievements on the softball field and her role as Hawaiʻi's first professional softball pitcher in any active pro softball league.

In 2020, Dung joined Feeding America's Hawaii Food Bank as an Ambassador. Using her platform on ESPN and YouTube to spotlight food insecurity in Hawai‘i. Kamalani's journey—from experiencing hunger to helping feed her community—came full circle, helping raise crucial funds during the pandemic through matched donations tied to her athletic performance.

In 2021, Dung was a panelist for the International Women's Day webinar, sharing her experience in athlete branding, viral marketing, and college NIL, she joined a lineup of women sports leaders and Forbes 30 under 30 honorees to discuss strategies brands can leverage when partnering with female athletes.

In 2022, Dung was highlighted with a Midweek Magazine Cover Feature for her "Pitcher Perfect" story highlighting her crossover appeal between sports, fashion, and culture.

Keynote speaker for 2023 Global CreativeMornings Community in Honolulu, HI – Presented on the topic of “Indurance” to a full chapter of Honolulu's creative leaders, sharing her journey from Waianae to global influence.

In 2023, Dung became a co-founder of the Professional Women's Softball Players Association (PWSPA). Focused on promoting the rights, well‑being, and professional development of women in pro softball. In 2023, Dung partnered with brands and community organizations to tour across the Pacific, delivering motivational talks to high school and middle school assemblies. Her speaking series focused on themes of resilience, identity, and leadership—encouraging students to overcome barriers and forge their own paths.

In 2024, Dung made an appearance playing in the Reggie Jackson Celebrity softball game at the MLB Oakland A's Coliseum in Oakland, CA. Dung hit a home run and played on team Rickey Henderson and Barry Bonds.

In 2024, Dung appeared as a featured speaker at the 10th Annual Young Women's Prom Event, a community empowerment initiative event providing formal attire and mentorship to high school girls, helping set their prom confidence. Dung joined alongside other notable figures to share her story of overcoming adversity and inspiring young women in attendance.

In 2024, Dung was honored with a national TOYA (Ten Outstanding Young Americans) award—one of the highest recognitions in the country for leaders under 40. She was recognized for her work as a professional athlete, entrepreneur, and trailblazer.

In 2025, Dung was featured as a public sports figure at the 2025 NBA All-Star Sports Illustrated and Draft Kings red carpets in San Francisco, CA.
