= 2020 NPF Draft =

Cancelled softball event

2020 NPF College Draft

General information
- Sport: Softball
- Date(s): TBA
- Location: Rosemont, Illinois
- Network(s): Facebook

Overview
- League: National Pro Fastpitch
- Teams: 4

The 2020 NPF College Draft was to have been the 17th annual collegiate draft for the National Pro Fastpitch. It was scheduled to take place on March 30, 2020 in Rosemont, Illinois, however, on March 16, 2020, the draft was postponed indefinitely due to the coronavirus pandemic.

The Canadian Wild opted not to participate in the draft, preferring to play with only their players who will be on their Olympic softball team. As an expansion team, California Commotion has been granted the first draft pick in each round, and an extra, fifth pick in each of the fourth and fifth rounds.

== Draft Selections ==
Position key:
C = catcher; INF = infielder; SS = shortstop; OF = outfielder; UT = Utility infielder; P = pitcher; RHP = right-handed pitcher; LHP = left-handed pitcher
Positions will be listed as combined for those who can play multiple positions.

^{+}	Denotes player who has been selected to at least one All-NPF team
^{#}	Denotes player who has not played in the NPF

=== Round 1 ===
Pick	Player	Pos.	NPF Team	College
1			California Commotion
2			Aussie Peppers
3			Chicago Bandits (Note: Cleveland Comets → Chicago Bandits January 11, 2020: Cleveland Comets traded their 1st overall draft pick in the 2020 NPF Draft to the Chicago Bandits, in exchange for LHP Danielle O'Toole.)
4			Chicago Bandits

=== Round 2 ===
Pick	Player	Pos.	NPF Team	College
5			California Commotion
6			Aussie Peppers
7			Cleveland Comets
8			Chicago Bandits

=== Round 3 ===
Pick	Player	Pos.	NPF Team	College
9			California Commotion
10			Aussie Peppers
11			Cleveland Comets
12			Chicago Bandits

=== Round 4 ===
Pick	Player	Pos.	NPF Team	College
13			California Commotion
14			Aussie Peppers
15			Cleveland Comets
16			Chicago Bandits
17			California Commotion

=== Round 5 ===
Pick	Player	Pos.	NPF Team	College
18			California Commotion
19			Aussie Peppers
20			Cleveland Comets
21			Chicago Bandits
22			California Commotion

=== Draft notes ===
Round 1:
