= 1998 WPF Draft =

1998 sports season (softball)

General information
- Sport: softball
- Date(s): December 6, 1997
- Location: Palm Springs, CA

Overview
- 60 total selections
- League: Women's Pro Fastpitch
- Teams: 6
- First selection: Desarie Knipfer P Cal Poly-SLO selected by Georgia Pride
- Most selections: Carolina Diamonds, 12 picks
- Fewest selections: Durham Dragons, Virginia Roadsters, Orlando Wahoos 9 picks each

The 1998 WPF Draft was the second annual collegiate draft for the WPSL/WPF's 1998 season, and was held on December 7, in Palm Springs, CA in conjunction with the 1998 NFCA National Convention. Draft order was based on teams' finish in 1997. Georgia Pride and Carolina Diamonds tied with the same record during the 1997 regular season. Georgia lost more games to Carolina in the 1997 head-to-head series and chose ahead of Carolina in the odd-numbered rounds. Carolina chose ahead of Georgia in the even numbered rounds.

Following are the 60 selections from the 1998 WPF draft:

== 1998 WPF Draft ==
Position key:
C = catcher; INF = infielder; SS = shortstop; OF = outfielder; UT = Utility infielder; P = pitcher; RHP = right-handed pitcher; LHP = left-handed pitcher
Positions will be listed as combined for those who can play multiple positions.

^{#}	Denotes player who has not played in the WPF/WPSL/NPF (Note: Unless otherwise noted, this was verified against the Historical Roster on the NPF's website.)

=== Round 1 ===
Pick	Player	Pos.	WPF Team	College
1	Desarie Knipfer	P	Georgia Pride	Cal Poly- San Luis Obispo
2	Eve Gaw^{#}	P	Carolina Diamonds	Washington
3	Debbie Bilbao^{#}	P	Tampa Bay Firestix	Iowa
4	Sheryl Scheve	P	Durham Dragons	Purdue
5	Jodi Dolan	OF	Virginia Roadsters	Ohio State
6	Ali Viola	SS	Tampa Bay Firestix (Note: Selection # 6 was acquired by TB from Orl in an earlier trade.)	Nebraska

=== Round 2 ===
Pick	Player	Pos.	WPF Team	College
7	Leanne Tyler^{#}	P	Carolina Diamonds	Oklahoma State
8	Whitney Floyd^{#}	P	Georgia Pride	California
9	Kristi Bolle	IF	Tampa Bay Firestix	Oklahoma State
10	Cheri Shinn^{#}	UT	Georgia Pride (Note: Selection #10 was acquired by Georgia from Durham in an earlier trade)	CS-Northridge
11	Jennifer Jaime	P	Virginia Roadsters	Oklahoma
12	Sandy Rhea	OF	Orlando Wahoos	Utah

=== Round 3 ===
Pick	Player	Pos.	WPF Team	College
13	Chelo Lopez	IF	Georgia Pride	CS-Northridge
14	Jodi Otten	2B	Carolina Diamonds	LSU
15	Rachel Johnson	OF	Tampa Bay Firestix	Oklahoma
16	Jen Smith	C	Durham Dragons	Nebraska
17	Raja Woods^{#}	UT	Carolina Diamonds (Note: Selection #17 was acquired by Carolina from Virginia on draft nights for the rights to Patty Becker.)	Arizona State
18	Monica Armendarez	3B	Orlando Wahoos	Indiana

=== Round 4 ===
Pick	Player	Pos.	WPF Team	College
19	Jen Buford	2B	Carolina Diamonds	Colorado State
20	Stephanie Bonillas^{#}	3B	Carolina Diamonds (Note: Selection # 20 was acquired by Carolina from Georgia on draft night for the rights to Crystal Boyd.)	New Mexico State
21	Kim Slover (Note: Slover opted to complete her college eligibility instead of signing with Tampa Bay. She was drafted by the Georgia Pride for the 1999 season and played with them.)	1B	Tampa Bay Firestix	Missouri
22	Jennifer Schoen	OF	Durham Dragons	Purdue
23	Kelly Buckley^{#}	C	Virginia Roadsters	Massachusetts
24	Kellyn Tate	OF	Orlando Wahoos	Michigan

=== Round 5 ===
Pick	Player	Pos.	WPF Team	College
25	Tia Morenz^{#}	C	Georgia Pride	Hawaiʻi
26	Victoria Ruelas	IF	Carolina Diamonds	San Jose State
27	Cara Johnson	UT	Tampa Bay Firestix	Western Illinois
28	Roxanne Tsosie^{#}	P	Durham Dragons	Arizona State
29	Kim Peck^{#}	P	Virginia Roadsters	Fresno State
30	Kristy Hull^{#}	C	Orlando Wahoos	Fresno State

=== Round 6 ===
Pick	Player	Pos.	WPF Team	College
31	Corina Lilly	P	Carolina Diamonds	San Jose State
32	Nina Lindenberg	2B	Georgia Pride	Fresno State
33	Jennifer Kintz^{#}	OF	Tampa Bay Firestix	Fla. Atlantic
34	Jill Haas^{#}	3B	Durham Dragons	Sacramento State
35	Julie Garcia	OF	Virginia Roadsters	Columbus St.
36	Lori Osterberg^{#}	SS	Orlando Wahoos	University of Southwestern Louisiana

=== Round 7 ===
Pick	Player	Pos.	WPF Team	College
37	Amanda Favorite^{#}	IF	Georgia Pride	Long Beach St.
38	Erin Hickey^{#}	OF	Carolina Diamonds	DePaul
39	Michelle Reeve	OF	Tampa Bay Firestix	Centenary
40	Sky Brown^{#}	P	Durham Dragons	South Carolina
41	Sara Fredstrom	SS	Virginia Roadsters	Colorado State
42	Amy Robertson^{#}	P	Orlando Wahoos	TN-Chattanooga

=== Round 8 ===
Pick	Player	Pos.	WPF Team	College
43	Brandy Arthur	P/OF	Carolina Diamonds	North Carolina
44	Lety Pineda	C	Georgia Pride	Arizona
45	Nicola Walsh^{#}	OF	Tampa Bay Firestix	Long Beach St.
46	Julie Crandall	IF	Durham Dragons	UNLV
47	Jenny Ackley	1B	Virginia Roadsters	California
48	Trish Charbonneau^{#}	IF	Orlando Wahoos	Ill.-Chicago

=== Round 9 ===
Pick	Player	Pos.	WPF Team	College
49	Diedre Shores	OF	Georgia Pride	SW Mo. St.
50	Jen Dean^{#}	3B	Carolina Diamonds	Northern Iowa
51	Laurie Fritz^{#}	2B/OF	Tampa Bay Firestix	UCLA
52	Kristen Drake^{#}	2B/SS	Durham Dragons	California
53	Lith Webb^{#}	3B	Virginia Roadsters	California University of Pennsylvania
54	Michelle Oswald	SS	Orlando Wahoos	NE Illinois

=== Round 10 ===
Pick	Player	Pos.	WPF Team	College
55	Kim Guthridge^{#}	1B	Carolina Diamonds	Massachusetts
56	Carolyn Wilson^{#}	C	Georgia Pride	Fresno State
57	Alison Johnsen^{#}	OF	Tampa Bay Firestix	Arizona
58	Laura Redding^{#}	IF	Durham Dragons	CS-Northridge
59	Tammy Pytel	2B	Virginia Roadsters	N. Illinois
60	Missy Kaczor^{#}	C	Orlando Wahoos	N. Illinois
