= 1998 Women's Pro Fastpitch season =

1998 WPF Season
- League: Women's Pro Fastpitch
- Sport: softball
- Duration: May 29, 1998 - September 5, 1998
- Number of teams: 6
- TV partner(s): ESPN2

1998 WPF Draft
- Top draft pick: Desarie Knipfer; Cal Poly-SLO
- Picked by: Georgia Pride

Regular Season
- Regular Season Champions: 1st Half: Carolina Diamonds; 2nd Half: Orlando Wahoos
- Season MVP: Crystl Bustos; Orlando Wahoos

WPF Championship
- Champions: Orlando Wahoos
- Runners-up: Carolina Diamonds
- Finals MVP: Alleah Poulson; Orlando Wahoos

WPF seasons
- ← 1997 1999 →

The 1998 Women's Pro Fastpitch season was the second season of professional softball for the Women's Pro Fastpitch (WPF). The 66-game season was divided into two-halves, with the winner of each half meeting in a championship series.

== Teams, cities and stadiums ==
Team	City	Stadium
Carolina Diamonds	Gastonia, North Carolina	Sims Legion Park
Durham Dragons	Durham, North Carolina	Durham Athletic Park
Georgia Pride	Columbus, Georgia	South Commons Softball Complex
Orlando Wahoos	Winter Park, Florida	Alfond Stadium at Rollins College
Tampa Bay FireStix	Tampa, Florida	Red McEwen Field
Virginia Roadsters	Hampton, Virginia	War Memorial Stadium

== Milestones and Events ==
Two WPF teams announced that they would play their games in different stadiums during the 1998 season: the Carolina Diamonds moved to Sims Legion Park in Gastonia, North Carolina, and the Georgia Pride announced that they would play their home games at South Commons Softball Stadium in Columbus, Georgia.

Changes for 1998 included a revision of the playing rules (43-foot pitching distance, 60-foot base distances), an expanded national television schedule (eight games on ESPN2), and the league's first all-star game, to be played at Firestone Stadium in Akron, Ohio on July 14.

== Player Acquisition ==
=== College Draft ===
The 10-round 1998 WPF Draft was held December 6, 1997 in Palm Springs, CA. Georgia Pride selected pitcher Desarie Knipfer of Cal Poly as the first overall pick.

== League standings ==
Team	GP	W	L	Pct.	GB	
Orlando Wahoos	66	42	24	.626	-	2nd Half Champion
Georgia Pride	66	36	30	.545	6	
Carolina Diamonds	65	34	31	.523	7.5	1st Half Champion
Durham Dragons	63	31	32	.492	9.5	
Tampa Bay FireStix	66	27	39	.409	15	
Virginia Roadsters	64	25	39	.391	16	

== WPF Championship Series ==
The 1998 WPF Championship Series was held at Sims Legion Park in Gastonia, North Carolina September 4–5. The winners of each half of the season met in a best-of-three series to determine the champion.

1998 WPF Championship Series Orlando Wahoos defeat Carolina Diamonds 2–0
Game	Date	Score	Series (ORL-CAR)
1	September 4	Orlando Wahoos 8, Carolina Diamonds 0	1–0
2	September 5	Orlando Wahoos 8, Carolina Diamonds 2	2–0

1998 WPF Championship Series MVP
Player	Club
Alleah Poulson	Orlando Wahoos

== Annual awards ==
Award	Player	Team
Most Valuable Player	Crystl Bustos	Orlando Wahoos
Hitter of the Year	Crystal Boyd	Georgia Pride
Home Run Champions	Monica Armendarez	Carolina Diamonds
Home Run Champions	Crystal Boyd	Georgia Pride
Home Run Champions	Crystl Bustos	Orlando Wahoos
Pitcher of the Year	Kaci Clark	Orlando Wahoos
Defensive Player of the Year	Shama Wilson	Georgia Pride
Coach of the Year	Sharron Backus	Orlando Wahoos
General Manager of the Year	Lorie Baran	Carolina Diamonds

== WPF All-Star Game ==
After the completion of the 1997 WPF season, the league circulated a questionnaire to players. At the suggestion of players on that questionnaire, the league scheduled an All-Star Game for the 1998 season.

The game was played on July 14 in Akron, OH at Firestone Stadium, televised on July 20 on ESPN2. The game was contested by a "Stars" team that played a "Stripes" team. The Stars team included players from the Diamonds, Dragons and Roadsters, while the Stripes were composed of players from the Pride, FireStix and Wahoos. The Stars beat the Stripes by an 8-1 score, in front of a crowd of 3,873.

Following is an incomplete listing of the All-Star rosters:

1998 WPF STARS All-STARS
Player	WPF Team	Position
COACHES
		All-Star Head Coach

1998 WPF STRIPES ALL-STARS
Player	WPF Team	Position
Dee Dee Weiman-Garcia	Tampa Bay FireStix	P
Amy Putnam	Georgia Pride	C
Crystal Bustos	Orlando Wahoos	
Chelo Lopez	Georgia Pride	
Jennifer Parker	Tampa Bay FireStix	OF
COACHES
		All-Star Head Coach

== See also ==
- List of professional sports leagues
- List of professional sports teams in the United States and Canada
