= 1997 WPF Draft =

General information
- Sport: softball

Overview
- League: Women's Pro Fastpitch

The 1997 WPF Drafts are a pair of player drafts held as part of the launch of the inaugural season of Women's Pro Fastpitch softball league. The first, the 1996 WPF Amateur Draft, a draft of 120 softball players, was held in Minneapolis, MN Oct. 8, 1996. The second, the 1997 WPF Senior Draft, a draft of 60 college seniors divided among the WPF's six teams, was held March 20, 1997.

NewsOK.com reported on a 1995 WPF draft. It is unclear if the date is incorrect, or if the results of this draft had any relationship with the 1996 and 1997 drafts mentioned above, or if the draft was disregarded entirely. NewsOK reported that Olympians Michele Smith and Lisa Fernandez were drafted. NewsOK also listed draftees pitchers Kim Ward (sixth round), Dena Carter (10th round) and Amy Day (11th round) and outfielder Becky Burroughs (13th round).

The tables below for the drafts are incomplete, but will be filled out as further research is completed.

The following players were reported as drafted, but the exact round and pick number unclear:

- Draftees Gena Weber and twin sisters Karla Kunnen-Wojtas and Kari Kunnen-Kossen reported to play for the Roadsters after the 1997 NCAA season finished.
- Marty Laudato was selected in the 16th round of the WPF draft in October.
- Molly Lackman, formerly of Immaculata, was picked two rounds two rounds after Laudato.

Following are some of the selections from the 1997 WPF drafts: Position key:
C = catcher; INF = infielder; SS = shortstop; OF = outfielder; UT = Utility infielder; P = pitcher; RHP = right-handed pitcher; LHP = left-handed pitcher
Positions will be listed as combined for those who can play multiple positions.

^{#}	Denotes player who has not played in the WPF, WPSL or the NPF (Note: Unless otherwise noted, this was verified against the Historical Roster on the NPF's website.)

== 1996 WPF Amateur Draft ==
=== Round 1 ===
Pick	Player	Pos.	WPF Team	College
1
2
3
4
5
6	Julie Smith	2B		Fresno State

=== Round 2 ===
Pick	Player	Pos.	WPF Team	College
7
8
9
10
11
12	Kim Maher	OF/3B		Fresno State

=== Round 3 ===
Pick	Player	Pos.	WPF Team	College
13	Shelly Stokes^{#}	C		Fresno State
14
15
16
17	Martha Norfsinger-O'Kelley^{#}	SS		Fresno State
18

=== Round 4 ===
Pick	Player	Pos.	WPF Team	College
19
20
21
22
23
24

=== Round 5 ===
Pick	Player	Pos.	WPF Team	College
25
26
27
28
29
30

=== Round 6 ===
Pick	Player	Pos.	WPF Team	College
31
32
33
34
35
36

=== Round 7 ===
Pick	Player	Pos.	WPF Team	College
37
38
39
40
41
42

=== Round 8 ===
Pick	Player	Pos.	WPF Team	College
43
44
45
46
47
48

=== Round 9 ===
Pick	Player	Pos.	WPF Team	College
49
50
51
52
53
54

=== Round 10 ===
Pick	Player	Pos.	WPF Team	College
55
56
57
58
59
60

=== Round 11 ===
Pick	Player	Pos.	WPF Team	College
61
62
63
64
65
66

=== Round 12 ===
Pick	Player	Pos.	WPF Team	College
67
68
69
70
71
72	Christa Yorke^{#}	C		Fresno State

=== Round 13 ===
Pick	Player	Pos.	WPF Team	College
73
74
75
76
77
78

=== Round 14 ===
Pick	Player	Pos.	WPF Team	College
79
80
81
82
83
84

=== Round 15 ===
Pick	Player	Pos.	WPF Team	College
85
86
87
88
89
90

=== Round 16 ===
Pick	Player	Pos.	WPF Team	College
91
92
93
94
95
96

=== Round 17 ===
Pick	Player	Pos.	WPF Team	College
97
98
99
100
101
102

=== Round 18 ===
Pick	Player	Pos.	WPF Team	College
103
104
105
106
107
108

=== Round 19 ===
Pick	Player	Pos.	WPF Team	College
103
104
105
106
107
108

=== Round 20 ===
Pick	Player	Pos.	WPF Team	College
109
110
111
112
113
114

=== Round 21 ===
Pick	Player	Pos.	WPF Team	College
115
116
117
118
119
120

== 1997 WPF Senior Draft ==
=== Round 1 ===
Pick	Player	Pos.	WPF Team	College
1	Trinity Johnson (Note: Johnson opted to retain her amateur status and declined joining the Roadsters. However, she did play for the Durham Dragons in 1999.)	P	Virginia Roadsters	South Carolina
2	Jill Most			Oklahoma
3
4
5
6

=== Round 2 ===
Pick	Player	Pos.	WPF Team	College
7
8
9	Randi Berg	SS	Georgia Pride	Fresno State
10
11
12

=== Round 3 ===
Pick	Player	Pos.	WPF Team	College
13
14
15
16
17
18	Jennifer Clark^{#}	RHP	Carolina Diamonds	Fresno State

=== Round 4 ===
Pick	Player	Pos.	WPF Team	College
19
20
21
22
23
24

=== Round 5 ===
Pick	Player	Pos.	WPF Team	College
25
26
27
28
29
30

=== Round 6 ===
Pick	Player	Pos.	WPF Team	College
31
32
33
34
35
36

=== Round 7 ===
Pick	Player	Pos.	WPF Team	College
37
38
39
40
41
42

=== Round 8 ===
Pick	Player	Pos.	WPF Team	College
43
44
45
46
47
48

=== Round 9 ===
Pick	Player	Pos.	WPF Team	College
49
50
51
52
53
54

=== Round 10 ===
Pick	Player	Pos.	WPF Team	College
55
56
57
58
59
60
