= Amanda Sánchez =

American softball player (born 1996)

Amanda Sánchez OLY
Personal information
- National team: Mexico
- Born: September 20, 1996 (age 30) West Covina, California, U.S.
- Height: 5 ft 9 in (175 cm)

Sport
- Sport: Softball
- Position: Infielder
- College team: Missouri Tigers; LSU Tigers
- League: National Pro Fastpitch
- Team: Cleveland Comets
- Turned pro: 2019

Amanda Sánchez (born September 20, 1996) is an American-Mexican softball player and member of the Mexico women's national softball team. She represented Team Mexico at the 2020 Summer Olympics.

== College career ==
Sánchez began her collegiate career at Missouri. As a freshman in 2015 she posted a .347 batting average, and ranked second on the team in home runs (14), RBI (56), total bases (108), and extra base hits (20). Following the season she was named to the Freshman All-SEC team. During her sophomore year in 2016 she posted a .354 batting average, with 62 hits, six home runs, seven doubles, 42 RBI, and three stolen bases.

During her junior year in 2017, she posted a .308 batting average with four doubles, three home runs and six RBI, before she suffered a season-ending injury on March 17, 2017. She was injured when she was thrown out at home while attempting to score on a wild pitch in a game against Ohio State. She applied for medical hardship and gained another year of eligibility. During her redshirt junior year in 2018, she posted a .374 batting average, with 12 home runs, 10 doubles and 31 runs scored. She ranked fourth the SEC in on-base percentage (.500), tied for ninth in average (.374) and slugging percentage (.671) and tied for 10th in home runs (12). She committed one error on 72 total attempts in SEC play, for a.986 fielding percentage, and was subsequently named to the SEC All-Defensive team.

On June 25, 2018, Sanchez announced she would transfer to LSU. During her senior year in 2019, she started 60 games for the Tigers, where she posted a .354 batting average, with 56 hits, 16 doubles, nine home runs, 39 runs and 54 RBI. She ranked second in the SEC and sixth in the nation with a .529 on base percentage. She recorded 55 putouts and 137 assists, with a .950 fielding percentage. Following the season she was named Second Team All-SEC, and NFCA Second Team All-American.

== Professional career ==
Sanchez was drafted fifth overall by the Cleveland Comets in the 2019 NPF Draft.

== International career ==
Sanchez represented Team Mexico at the 2020 Summer Olympics. She became the first Olympian in LSU program history.
