= 2021 National Pro Fastpitch season =

2021 NPF Season
- League: National Pro Fastpitch
- Sport: softball
- Number of teams: 5

NPF seasons
- ← ~~2020~~

The 2021 National Pro Fastpitch season was to be the 17th season of professional softball under the name National Pro Fastpitch (NPF) for the only professional women's softball league in the United States.

It was supposed to be the return of the league following the cancellation of the 2020 National Pro Fastpitch season due to the COVID-19 pandemic. However, due to the continuation of the pandemic, combined with the unavailability of home venues for the league’s member teams, continued COVID-19 protocols and quarantine requirements imposed on international teams who also field teams in the league, as well as the 2020 Summer Olympics, which would already shorten the season further, the decision was made to cancel the 2021 season as well. Later into 2021 the league folded, making the 2019 season the last season to have featured play.

== Planned teams ==
Team	City	Stadium
Aussie Peppers	North Mankato, Minnesota	Caswell Park Softball Complex
California Commotion	Not announced	
Canadian Wild	Marion, Illinois	Rent One Park
Chicago Bandits	Rosemont, Illinois (Chicago area)	Rosemont Stadium
Cleveland Comets	Traveling team	
