= 2020 National Pro Fastpitch season =

2020 NPF Season
- League: National Pro Fastpitch
- Sport: softball
- Number of teams: 5

NPF seasons
- ← 2019 ~~2021~~ →

The 2020 National Pro Fastpitch season was to be the 17th season of professional softball under the name National Pro Fastpitch (NPF) for the only professional women's softball league in the United States. However, due to the COVID-19 pandemic the season was cancelled.

== Summary ==
The 2020 season was expected to feature 5 teams with a new schedule format. The California Commotion joined as an expansion side, while the Beijing Eagles and USSSA Pride departed the league. Due to the COVID-19 pandemic, on March 16, the league postponed and later cancelled the 2020 NPF Draft and postponed the start of the season. On March 31, the Aussie Peppers opted out of participating in the season due to the pandemic. On April 13, the Canadian Wild became the second team to opt out of the season. On May 15, the NPF officially cancelled the season.

== Planned teams ==
| Team | City | Stadium |
|---|---|---|
| Aussie Peppers | North Mankato, Minnesota | Caswell Park Softball Complex |
| California Commotion | Not announced | |
| Canadian Wild | Marion, Illinois | Rent One Park |
| Chicago Bandits | Rosemont, Illinois (Chicago area) | Rosemont Stadium |
| Cleveland Comets | Traveling team | |
