= Cheyanne Tarango =

American softball player (born 1993)

Personal information
- Born: Cheyanne Elizabeth Tarango; August 21, 1993 (age 32) Anaheim Hills, California, U.S.
- Height: 5 ft 8 in (1.73 m)

Sport
- Country: Mexico/USA
- Sport: Softball
- College team: Tennessee Volunteers
- Team: Cleveland Comets (2019-present)

Cheyanne Elizabeth Tarango (born August 21, 1993) is an American softball player. She attended Canyon High School in Anaheim Hills, California. She later attended the University of Tennessee, where she played both first base and pitcher for the Tennessee Volunteers softball team. During her college career, Tarango and the Tennessee softball team made three trips to the Women's College World Series in 2012, 2013, and 2015; finishing the 2013 season as the national runner-up after falling to Oklahoma, 2–0. Following her college career, Tarango served as a volunteer assistant coach at the University of Louisville for the Louisville Cardinals softball team.

Tarango represented Mexico at the World Cup of Softball, playing on the Mexico women's national softball team. As of 2019, she plays on the Cleveland Comets, which is part of the National Pro Fastpitch.
