= Softball at the 2018 Central American and Caribbean Games =

- Venue: Little League Stadium
- Location: (Colombia) Barranquilla
- Dates: 20 July – 2 August
- Nations: 9
- Teams: 7 (men); 7 (women)

Champions
- Men: Cuba
- Women: Puerto Rico

Softball at the 2018 Central American and Caribbean Games was held from the 20 to 26 July for the women's tournament, and from 27 July to 2 August for the men's tournament. Both tournaments were held at the Little League Stadium in Barranquilla, Colombia.

== Medal summary ==
Event	Gold	Silver	Bronze
Men	Cuba	Venezuela	Dominican Republic
Women	Puerto Rico	Mexico	Cuba

== Qualification ==
=== Men ===
Means of qualification	Date	Venue	Vacancies	Qualifier
Host country	11 June 2014	(Mexico) Veracruz	1	Colombia
2017 Pan American Championships	15–24 September	(Dominican Republic) Santo Domingo	6	Venezuela; Mexico; Cuba; Guatemala; Dominican Republic; Bahamas
Total			7	

=== Women ===
Means of qualification	Date	Venue	Vacancies	Qualifier
Host country	11 June 2014	(Mexico) Veracruz	1	Colombia
2017 Pan American Championships	4–13 August	(Dominican Republic) Santo Domingo	6	Mexico; Venezuela; Puerto Rico; Cuba; Dominican Republic; Curaçao
Total			7	

== Men's tournament ==
=== Group stage ===
Team	G	W	L	RS	RA	RD
Venezuela	6	6	0	31	8	+23
Cuba	6	5	1	31	11	+20
Dominican Republic	6	4	2	25	18	+7
Mexico	6	3	3	35	28	+7
Colombia	6	2	4	21	29	–8
Bahamas	6	1	5	9	39	–30
Guatemala	6	0	6	21	40	–19

Qualified for the semifinals

27 July 2018; 11:30	Venezuela	10–2	Mexico
27 July 2018; 11:30		Boxscore

27 July 2018; 14:00	Cuba	5–4	Guatemala
27 July 2018; 14:00		Boxscore

27 July 2018; 16:30	Dominican Republic	6–0	Bahamas
27 July 2018; 16:30		Boxscore

27 July 2018; 19:00	Colombia	0–1	Dominican Republic
27 July 2018; 19:00		Boxscore

28 July 2018; 10:00	Mexico	2–3	Cuba
28 July 2018; 10:00		Boxscore

28 July 2018; 12:30	Dominican Republic	0–5	Venezuela
28 July 2018; 12:30		Boxscore

28 July 2018; 15:00	Venezuela	4–0	Bahamas
28 July 2018; 15:00		Boxscore

28 July 2018; 17:00	Colombia	9–4	Guatemala
28 July 2018; 17:00		Boxscore

29 July 2018; 10:00	Guatemala	3–6	Venezuela
29 July 2018; 10:00		Boxscore

29 July 2018; 12:30	Dominican Republic	6–5	Mexico
29 July 2018; 12:30		Boxscore

29 July 2018; 15:00	Mexico	11–4 (F/6)	Bahamas
29 July 2018; 15:00		Boxscore

29 July 2018; 17:00	Bahamas	0–8 (F/5)	Colombia
29 July 2018; 17:00		Boxscore

29 July 2018; 19:30	Colombia	0–11 (F/4)	Cuba
29 July 2018; 19:30		Boxscore

30 July 2018; 10:00	Cuba	4–3	Dominican Republic
30 July 2018; 10:00		Boxscore

30 July 2018; 12:30	Bahamas	0–7 (F/6)	Cuba
30 July 2018; 12:30		Boxscore

30 July 2018; 15:00	Guatemala	3–6	Mexico
30 July 2018; 15:00		Boxscore

30 July 2018; 17:00	Venezuela	4–2	Colombia
30 July 2018; 17:00		Boxscore

31 July 2018; 10:00	Dominican Republic	10–4 (F/5)	Guatemala
31 July 2018; 10:00		Boxscore

31 July 2018; 12:30	Guatemala	3–5	Bahamas
31 July 2018; 12:30		Boxscore

31 July 2018; 15:00	Cuba	1–2	Venezuela
31 July 2018; 15:00		Boxscore

31 July 2018; 17:00	Mexico	9–2	Colombia
31 July 2018; 17:00		Boxscore

=== Playoff round ===
Semifinals
1	Venezuela	1
2	Cuba	2
3	Dominican Republic	6
4	Mexico	1

Final
1	Venezuela	6
3	Dominican Republic	1

Grand Final
2	Cuba	4
1	Venezuela	2

==== Semifinals ====
1 August 2018; 16:00	Mexico	1–6	Dominican Republic
1 August 2018; 16:00		Boxscore

1 August 2018; 18:00	Cuba	2–1 (F/9)	Venezuela
1 August 2018; 18:00		Boxscore

==== Final ====
2 August 2018; 16:00	Dominican Republic	1–6	Venezuela
2 August 2018; 16:00		Boxscore

==== Grand Final ====
2 August 2018; 18:00	Cuba	4–2	Venezuela
2 August 2018; 18:00		Boxscore

=== Final standing ===
Rank	Team
1st place, gold medalist(s)	Cuba
2nd place, silver medalist(s)	Venezuela
3rd place, bronze medalist(s)	Dominican Republic
4	Mexico
5	Colombia
6	Bahamas
7	Guatemala

== Women's tournament ==
=== Group stage ===
Team	G	W	L	RS	RA	RD
Mexico	6	6	0	26	8	+18
Puerto Rico	6	5	1	33	8	+25
Venezuela	6	3	3	27	17	+10
Cuba	6	3	3	19	20	–1
Dominican Republic	6	2	4	12	20	–8
Curaçao	6	1	5	15	31	–16
Colombia	6	1	5	11	39	–28

Qualified for the semifinals

20 July 2018; 12:00	Mexico	5–0	Venezuela
20 July 2018; 12:00		Boxscore

20 July 2018; 14:30	Puerto Rico	10–1 (F/5)	Cuba
20 July 2018; 14:30		Boxscore

20 July 2018; 17:00	Dominican Republic	4–1	Curaçao
20 July 2018; 17:00		Boxscore

20 July 2018; 19:30	Colombia	3–2	Dominican Republic
20 July 2018; 19:30		Boxscore

21 July 2018; 10:00	Venezuela	4–6	Puerto Rico
21 July 2018; 10:00		Boxscore

21 July 2018; 12:30	Dominican Republic	2–9 (F/5)	Mexico
21 July 2018; 12:30		Boxscore

21 July 2018; 15:00	Mexico	3–2	Curaçao
21 July 2018; 15:00		Boxscore

21 July 2018; 17:00	Colombia	1–2	Cuba
21 July 2018; 17:00		Boxscore

22 July 2018; 10:00	Cuba	3–5	Mexico
22 July 2018; 10:00		Boxscore

22 July 2018; 12:30	Dominican Republic	4–1	Venezuela
22 July 2018; 12:30		Boxscore

22 July 2018; 15:00	Venezuela	7–0 (F/6)	Curaçao
22 July 2018; 15:00		Boxscore

22 July 2018; 17:00	Curaçao	12–4	Colombia
22 July 2018; 17:00		Boxscore

22 July 2018; 19:30	Colombia	1–10 (F/5)	Puerto Rico
22 July 2018; 19:30		Boxscore

23 July 2018; 10:00	Puerto Rico	2–0	Dominican Republic
23 July 2018; 10:00		Boxscore

23 July 2018; 12:30	Curaçao	0–4	Puerto Rico
23 July 2018; 12:30		Boxscore

23 July 2018; 15:00	Cuba	0–4	Venezuela
23 July 2018; 15:00		Boxscore

23 July 2018; 17:00	Mexico	2–0	Colombia
23 July 2018; 17:00		Boxscore

24 July 2018; 10:00	Dominican Republic	0–4	Cuba
24 July 2018; 10:00		Boxscore

24 July 2018; 12:30	Cuba	9–0 (F/5)	Curaçao
24 July 2018; 12:30		Boxscore

24 July 2018; 15:00	Puerto Rico	1–2	Mexico
24 July 2018; 15:00		Boxscore

24 July 2018; 17:00	Venezuela	11–2 (F/5)	Colombia
24 July 2018; 17:00		Boxscore

=== Playoff round ===
Semifinals
1	Mexico	5
2	Puerto Rico	1
3	Venezuela	5
4	Cuba	6

Final
2	Puerto Rico	4
4	Cuba	0

Grand Final
1	Mexico	2
2	Puerto Rico	4

==== Semifinals ====
25 July 2018; 16:00	Cuba	6–5	Venezuela
25 July 2018; 16:00		Boxscore

25 July 2018; 18:00	Puerto Rico	1–5	Mexico
25 July 2018; 18:00		Boxscore

==== Final ====
26 July 2018; 16:00	Cuba	0–4	Puerto Rico
26 July 2018; 16:00		Boxscore

==== Grand Final ====
26 July 2018; 18:00	Puerto Rico	4–2	Mexico
26 July 2018; 18:00		Boxscore

=== Final standing ===
Rank	Team
1st place, gold medalist(s)	Puerto Rico
2nd place, silver medalist(s)	Mexico
3rd place, bronze medalist(s)	Cuba
4	Venezuela
5	Dominican Republic
6	Curaçao
7	Colombia
