= Bahamas men's national softball team =

Bahamas men's national softball team is the national team for Bahamas. The 1988 World Championships were held in Saskatoon, Canada. The team played 13 games in the round robin round. They finished sixth overall. The team competed at the 1996 ISF Men's World Championship in Midland, Michigan where they finished with 5 wins and 5 losses.
