= California Commotion =

Professional women's softball team

- Logo

Information
- League: National Pro Fastpitch
- Location: California
- Founded: 2020
- Ownership: Damon Zumwalt
- Coach: Kirk Walker

The California Commotion were a professional women's softball team based in California. They were founded in 2019 as part of National Pro Fastpitch to be an expansion club for the 2020 National Pro Fastpitch season.

== History ==
Their introduction made them the first West Coast-based team in the league since 2005, when the California Sunbirds left the league. The club planned to prioritize West Coast players in their roster. On November 17, 2019, Kirk Walker was named head coach and assistant general manager of the team. The team would not have a home field for the 2020 season, and instead would play games throughout the state, although their main team base would be in Los Angeles.

Their debut was delayed indefinitely as the 2020 and 2021 seasons were cancelled due to the COVID-19 pandemic. On August 1, 2021, the league announced that, due to a lack of revenue after cancelling the previous two seasons, it would be suspending operations. As a result, the California Commotion never played a game.
