= Cleveland Comets =

Softball team in Ohio

- Logo

Information
- League: National Pro Fastpitch
- Ballpark: Mercy Health Stadium
- Founded: 2018
- General manager: Stephen Dunn
- Website: clevelandcomets.us

The Cleveland Comets were a women's professional softball team based in Cleveland, Ohio. Founded by General Manager, Stephen Dunn. They moved to Cleveland from Akron, Ohio, in 2018. The Comets played as a member of National Pro Fastpitch (NPF) and had a partnership with the Mexico women's national softball team.

== History ==
The Cleveland Comets played as the Akron Racers until 2018. The Racers were founded in 1999 and played two seasons in the WPSL. They joined the re-formed NPF in 2004 and played until 2017, when they moved to Cleveland and became the Comets.

The Comets played in the NPF as a travel team for the 2018 season, before moving to Sprenger Stadium for the 2019 season. They were scheduled to return to the league as a travel team in 2020, but the season was canceled due to the COVID-19 pandemic which eventually led to the league folding.

== 2019 roster ==
Cleveland Comets roster
Active roster (YYYY = Final season of player contract)		Inactive roster	Coaches
Pitchers: 1 Shelby McCombs (2020) (United States); 4 Randi Rupp (2020) (United States); 18 Taylor McQuillin (2020) (Mexico); 77 Cheyanne Tarango (2020) (Mexico); 89 Sierra Hyland (2020) (Mexico)	Catchers: 2 Emily Clark (2020) (United States); 13 Sashel Palacios (2020) (Mexico); 14 Brittany Cervantes (2020) (Mexico); Utility players: 33 Anahi Lizarraga (2020) (Mexico); Infielders: 11 Chelsea Gonzales (2020) (Mexico); 17 Anissa Urtez (2020) (Mexico); 20 Amanda Sanchez (2020) (Mexico); 22 Lilli Piper (2020) (United States); 28 Jade Rhodes (2020) (United States); 29 Tori Vidales (2020) (Mexico); 5 Emily Carosone (2020) (United States); Outfielders: 10 Sammy Marshall (2020) (United States); 23 Stefania Aradillas (2020) (Mexico); 26 Gordy Bravo (2020) (Mexico); 31 Carly Thomas (2020) (Mexico); 71 Koral Costa (2020) (Mexico)		Legend: * Franchise Player Tag; (C) Captain; (A) Alternate captain; → All NPF rosters
