= Ellen Roberts (softball) =

Australian softball and baseball player

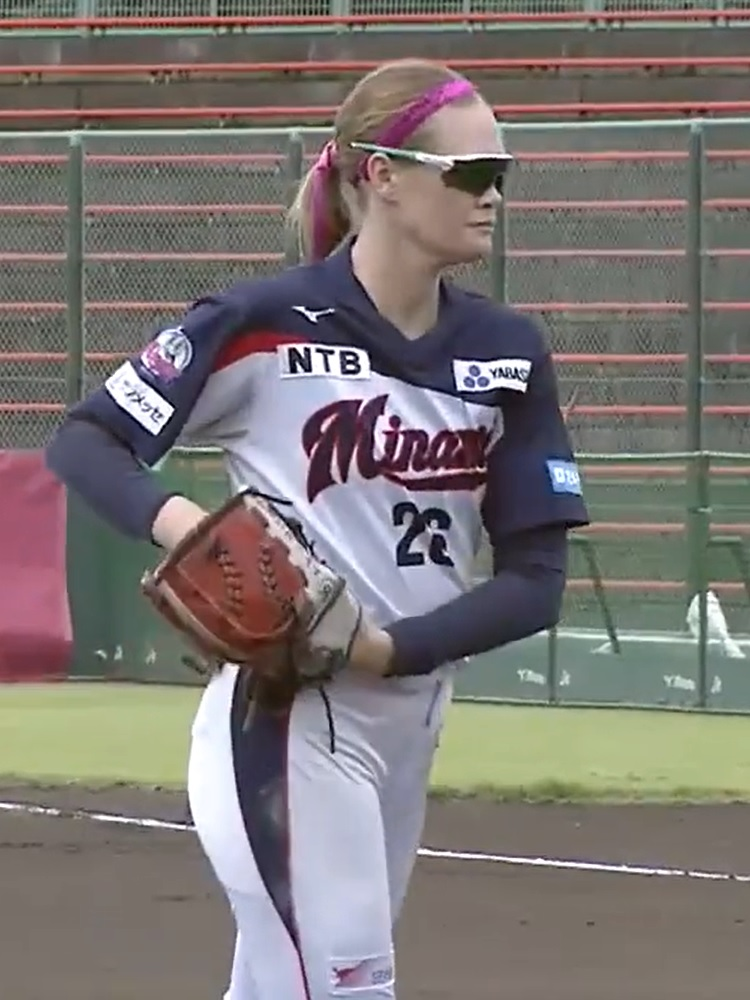

Personal information
- Nationality: Australian
- Born: 8 April 1992 (age 34) Westleigh, New South Wales, Australia
- Height: 176 cm (5 ft 9 in)

Sport
- Country: Australia
- Sport: Softball, Baseball
- Event: Australian National Team "Aussie Spirit"
- College team: University of Memphis
- Team: Ogaki Minamo (2018–2023)
- Coached by: Les Roberts, Bill Holland

Achievements and titles
- Olympic finals: 2020 Tokyo Olympics
Medal record
Softball
Representing Australia
ISF Women's World Championships
Bronze medal – third place	2014 Netherlands	Women's Team

Ellen Roberts (born 8 April 1992) is an Australian, former collegiate, right-handed professional softball pitcher. Roberts played for Ogaki Minamo in the Japan Diamond Softball League.

On the World stage, Roberts represents Australia and was part of the 2020 Olympic Team. During National competition, she represents New South Wales where she has won 10 national championships.

Roberts has also played Softball in Italy, The Netherlands, Czech Republic, USA and New Zealand.

== Softball ==
=== Early career ===
She was selected in a NSW team for the first time in 2008 (U16 Girls), Ellen also represented NSW at U19 level in 2009, 2010 and 2011, winning national championship titles in all four of these years.

Ellen's strong performances at the 2011 U19 Women's National Championship led to her selection in the Australian U19 team for that year's Junior Women's World Championship, where Australia finished fourth.

==== University of Memphis ====
In 2011, Roberts joined the University of Memphis as a Freshman. She played 11 games with starts, including a shut out against Alabama A&M. Roberts made pinch hit appearances in the NCAA Regional Tournament.

In her sophomore year, Roberts appeared in 52 games starting 50 in the circle and as a hitter. She led the team with a 3.06ERA, 150 strike outs across 199.1 innings.

For her Junior Year, Roberts was named the Conference USA Pitcher of the Week on April 15. Twicer named the Tennessee Sports Writers Association Pitcher of the Week. She posted 179 strikeouts in 240 innings pitched.

In her final year for Memphis, Roberts was named the Tennessee Sports Writers Association Pitcher of the Week for the third time in her college career. She was also selected to the National Fastpitch Coaches Association All-Region Third Team. Roberts posted 147 strikeouts in 203.1 innings pitched. This season also saw Roberts pick up her 38th career win on April 6, moving her to the all time win leader at Memphis.

Over her collegiate career she holds the career record 103 starts and 659.1 innings pitched. From 2011 to 2014 where she broke 25 school records, including most strike-outs in school history, and game wins.

=== Professional career ===
Roberts started her professional career in 2015 playing in the Italian league for two seasons where she won several top pitcher awards and was selected in the All-Star Team each year. While in Europe, Ellen competed for the Czech Republic Club Teams Storms and Tempo in the European Championship in the summer of 2015 and 2016. In 2017, Roberts joined Olympia Haarlem in the Dutch League where they became the Gold League Champions, and she was awarded the MVP of the final tournament. During the summer break, Roberts debuted in the 2017 Pro Fastpitch for Chicago Bandits in the NPF(National Professional Fastpitch) League, USA, and played in the NPF for 2018 and 2019 seasons too for the Australian National Team. She also played for Mount Albert Ramblers in the New Zealand league for three seasons (2016-2018) where she won several Best Pitcher awards and contributed to several tournament wins for Ramblers.

In 2018, Roberts signed with Ogaki Minamo and Seino Holdings to play in the Japanese Professional League D1. She was awarded the Best Pitcher in the Japanese League D2 in 2019, and in 2020 helped Minamo be promoted again to division 1 for the 2021. Minamo had a successful return to D1 2021 with Roberts contributing to three big wins. She is currently signed to play her fifth season for Ogaki Minamo in the new Japanese Diamond League for 2022.

=== Australian National Championships ===
Roberts represents New South Wales in national competitions. She has won 10 national championship titles.

=== Australian Softball Team ===
==== Junior National Team ====
Roberts was selected to the Junior National Team following the 2011 U19 Women's National Championship. She represented Australia in the 2011 Junior Women's World Championship finishing 4th.

==== Senior National Softball Team ====
In 2014, Roberts made her debut for the senior Australian National Team at the World Championship in the Netherlands where she won a bronze medal.

After missing out on the 2016 World Championship, Roberts was back in the team for the 2018 Championship in Chiba, Japan.

Roberts was selected for the Australian Team for the 2020 Tokyo Olympic Team. Australia came away with one win out of five, beating Italy 1-0 in their second match of the Round Robin and finished fifth overall.

In 2022, Roberts was selected to represent Australia at the Canada Cup and the 2022 World Games.

== Personal ==
Roberts was born on 8 April 1992 in Westleigh, New South Wales. She started playing softball at five years old with Thornleigh Softball Club, later playing for Kissing Point Sports Club. Roberts attended the Sydney 2000 Olympic Games Opening Ceremony, where it is said her dream to be an Olympian began.

She attended the University of Memphis where she majored in physical and teacher education.
