= Dejah Mulipola =

American softball player

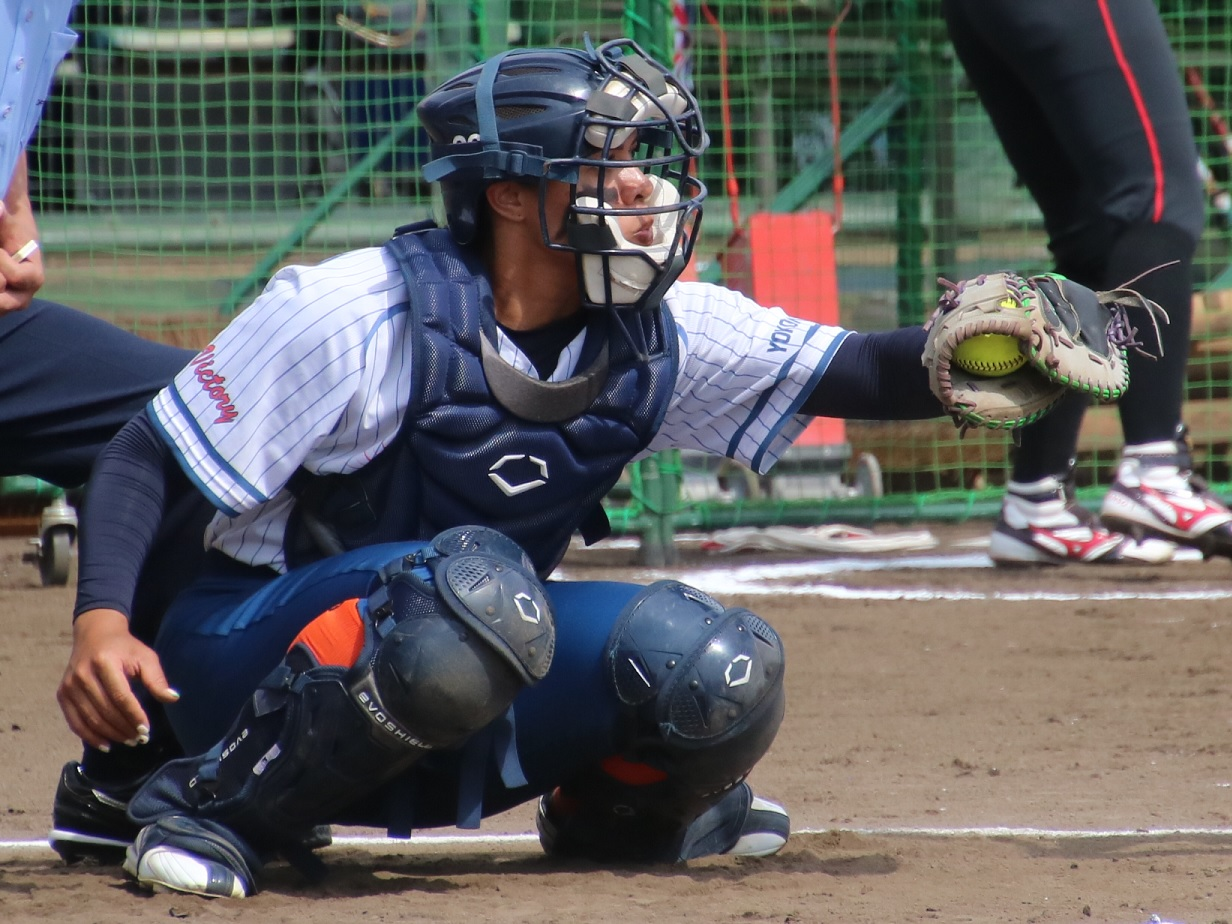
- Mulipola in 2024

Personal information
- Born: February 19, 1998 (age 28) Los Alamitos, California, U.S.

Sport
- Country: USA
- Sport: Softball
- Position: Catcher
- Team: Athletes Unlimited (2021–present); Hitachi Sundiva (2024–present); Oklahoma City Spark (2024); Texas Volts (2025–present)
Medal record
Women's softball
Representing United States
Olympic Games
Silver medal – second place	2020 Tokyo	Team
World Games
Gold medal – first place	2022 Birmingham	Team
Gold medal – first place	2025 Chengdu	Team
Pan American Games
Gold medal – first place	2019 Lima	Team
Gold medal – first place	2023 Santiago	Team

Dejah Monique Mulipola (born February 19, 1998) is an American professional softball player for the Texas Volts of the Athletes Unlimited Softball League (AUSL). She played college softball at Arizona, where she was named a First Team All-American by the National Fastpitch Coaches Association (NFCA) in 2019 and 2021. She is a member of the United States women's national softball team, winning a silver medal at the 2020 Summer Olympics. She played in Athletes Unlimited Softball, where she won the 2022 championship as the top individual points leader.

== Early life ==
Mulipola is of Samoan and Mexican descent. She was born in Los Alamitos, California to Ed Mulipola and Rosalie Leuta. Her hometown is Garden Grove, California, where she attended Pacifica High School.

== Playing career ==
=== College career ===
Mulipola began her career for the Wildcats setting personal bests in hits, doubles while also leading the team in triples. On February 19, Mulipola used a double and home run to knock in a career best 6 RBIs to run-rule the Boston College Eagles. In a loss to the Utah Utes on April 14, she had a perfect day at the plate with four hits for another career highlight. As a sophomore Mulipola was named a Second Team All-Pac 12 performer, leading the team in triples, walks and fielding percentage. In a run-rule victory against the Texas Longhorns on March 4, Mulipola walked 3 times for another career high.

In 2019, Mulipola achieved First Team All-Pac 12 and National Fastpitch Coaches Association All-American citations. She was also named NFCA Catcher of the Year. She had career highs in home runs and walks. Mulipola helped the Wildcats return to the 2019 Women's College World Series for the first time since 2010 before being eliminated by the Alabama Crimson Tide on May 31. She had two hits including a home run in three games at the series.

In 2021, Mulipola once again earned First Team All-Pac 12 and NFCA First Team All-American honors. She was also named a finalist for the Honda Softball Award. She set career highs in batting average, runs batted in and slugging percentage. On February 25, Mulipola hit her 50th career home run, a grand slam off Reggie Kanagawa to run-rule the BYU Cougars. From April 18–May 8 she had her best hitting streak at 10 consecutive games. She hit .428 (12/28) with 9 RBIs, two home runs, three doubles and 4 walks before being shutout by the Oregon Ducks. On May 22 to defeat the Mississippi Rebels, she became the 12th wildcat to join the 50 home run 200 RBI list by collecting 5 RBIs to reach the 200 milestone. Mulipola made her final collegiate appearance in a loss to the Florida State Seminoles on June 5 at the 2021 Women's College World Series and managed only a walk. Mulipola currently ranks as the second best fielding catcher and overall player for the Wildcats in school history with a .996 fielding percentage.

=== Professional career ===
Mulipola was drafted fourth overall in the 2021 Athletes Unlimited Softball draft. She won the 2022 championship as the top individual points leader with 1,782 points. Mulipola would go on to play for the Hitachi Sundiva of the Japan Diamond Softball League and the Oklahoma City Spark, an independent team at the time of her signing.

On January 29, 2025, Mulipola was drafted tenth overall by the Volts in the inaugural Athletes Unlimited Softball League draft.

== International career ==
Mulipola returned to Arizona for the 2021 season, after missing the 2020 season due to the Stand Beside Her Tour with USA Softball in preparation for the 2020 Summer Olympics. At the Olympics, Mulipola would claim a silver medal as Team USA was defeated by Team Japan in the gold medal game.

On August 31, 2023, Mulipola was named to the U.S. women's national team for the 2023 Pan American Games. She represented the United States at the 2024 Women's Softball World Cup and won a silver medal. At the 2026 USA Softball International Cup, Mulipola was named Defensive MVP of the tournament as the United States won gold.

== Statistics ==
Arizona Wildcats
YEAR	G	AB	R	H	BA	RBI	HR	3B	2B	TB	SLG	BB	SO	SB	SBA
2017	60	173	54	58	.335	49	12	3	12	112	.647%	25	29	1	2
2018	59	166	36	52	.313	36	12	3	6	100	.602%	29	42	3	4
2019	62	167	49	52	.311	55	23	0	7	128	.766%	43	45	1	2
2021	56	148	53	57	.385	63	21	0	8	128	.865%	34	31	0	0
TOTALS	237	654	192	219	.335	203	68	6	33	468	.715%	131	147	5	8

Team USA
YEAR	G	AB	R	H	BA	RBI	HR	3B	2B	TB	SLG	BB	SO	SB
2020	9	17	6	8	.470	4	1	0	0	11	.647%	6	2	0
2021	7	17	3	5	.294	1	1	0	0	8	.470%	3	5	0
Olympics	1	2	1	1	.500	0	0	0	0	1	.500%	1	1	0
TOTALS	17	36	10	14	.389	5	2	0	0	20	.555%	10	8	0

Athletes Unlimited
YEAR	G	AB	R	H	BA	RBI	HR	3B	2B	TB	SLG	BB	SO	SB
2021	14	40	4	13	.325	8	2	2	2	25	.625%	6	8	0
