= Taylor Edwards =

American softball player (born 1992)

Personal information
- Full name: Taylor Brianne Edwards
- Nationality: American
- Born: 26 April 1992 (age 34) Fountain Valley, California
- Home town: Murrieta, California
- Education: Vista Murrieta High School; University of Nebraska–Lincoln
- Height: 5 ft 7 in (170 cm)
- Spouse: Gwen Svekis (m. 2025)

Sport
- Sport: Softball
- Position: Catcher
- League: National Pro Fastpitch

Taylor Brianne Edwards (born 26 April 1992) is an American softball player. She played for the National Pro Fastpitch League (NPF) and was a reserve player for the American team in the Tokyo 2020 Summer Olympics.

== Early life ==
Taylor Brianne Edwards was born on April 26, 1992 in Fountain Valley, California. Her parents, Brian and Denise Edwards, raised her in Murrieta, California. Edwards has an older brother Tyler, a younger sister Tristen, and a twin sister Tatum. Tatum played softball with Edwards in both high school and in the NPF. Tristen also played softball.

In high school, Tatum, a pitcher, struggled with a movement disorder called the yips. This meant she could no longer control certain pitches. Edwards has said that training with Tatum and learning to catch out of control pitches caused her to improve significantly.

After graduating from Vista Murrieta High School, Edwards attended the University of Nebraska–Lincoln. Her jersey number, 12, was retired at the university. She graduated in 2014 with a degree in sociology.

== Professional softball career ==
Edwards began her professional career playing for the Pennsylvania Rebellion in 2014. She was the number 8 overall pick in the NPF draft that year. She then spent two years playing for the Chicago Bandits, and another year playing for the Scrap Yard Dawgs before leaving the NPF. While in the NPF, Edwards won three straight NPF championships in 2015, 2016, and 2017. In 2018, she went to the USA Softball International Cup with the American team, winning gold.

She later played two seasons for the independent team Scrap Yard Fast Pitch. Edwards played in the Japanese professional softball league for another two seasons with the Denso Bright Pegasus team.

Edwards was a reserve player on the American softball team for the 2020 Tokyo Olympics. She was one of 18 players selected for the team, three of which were reserve players. The team won silver. Edwards also played in the Stand Beside Her tour, a series of games meant to help the softball team prepare for the 2020 Olympics. The tour was interrupted by the start of the COVID-19 pandemic.

Edwards broke two NCAA records: in 2011, most consecutive games with a home run (6) and in 2013, most grand-slams in a single game (2).

== Post-retirement ==
After retiring from professional softball, Edwards began coaching softball at Dublin Scioto High School in Dublin, Ohio. Her sister Tatum and wife Gwen Svekis also coach there.

== Personal life ==
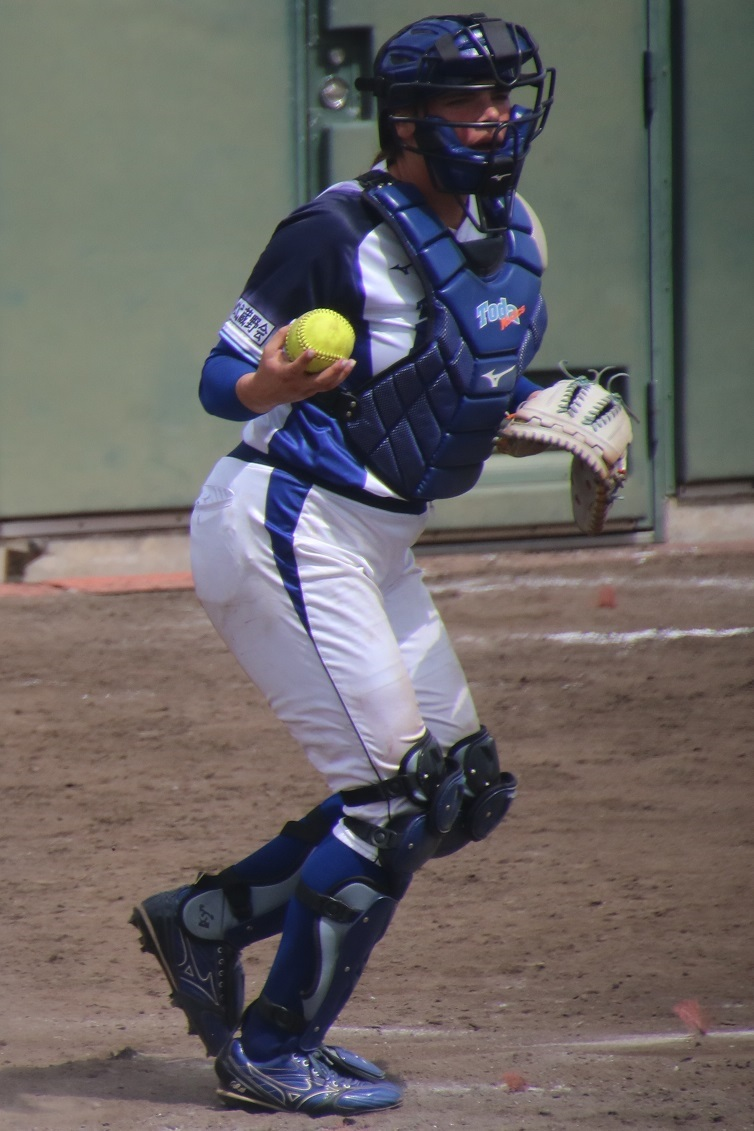
Edwards’ wife Gwen Svekis

Edwards is openly LGBTQ. She married fellow softball player Gwen Svekis on 30 June 2025. Edwards was one of a record-breaking 186 athletes at the Tokyo 2020 Olympics to be out as LGBTQ.

Edwards has worked with the Robert Wood Johnson Foundation.

She has named Stacey Nuveman-Deniz as being a role model to her.
