= Sahvanna Jaquish =

American softball pitcher (born 1995

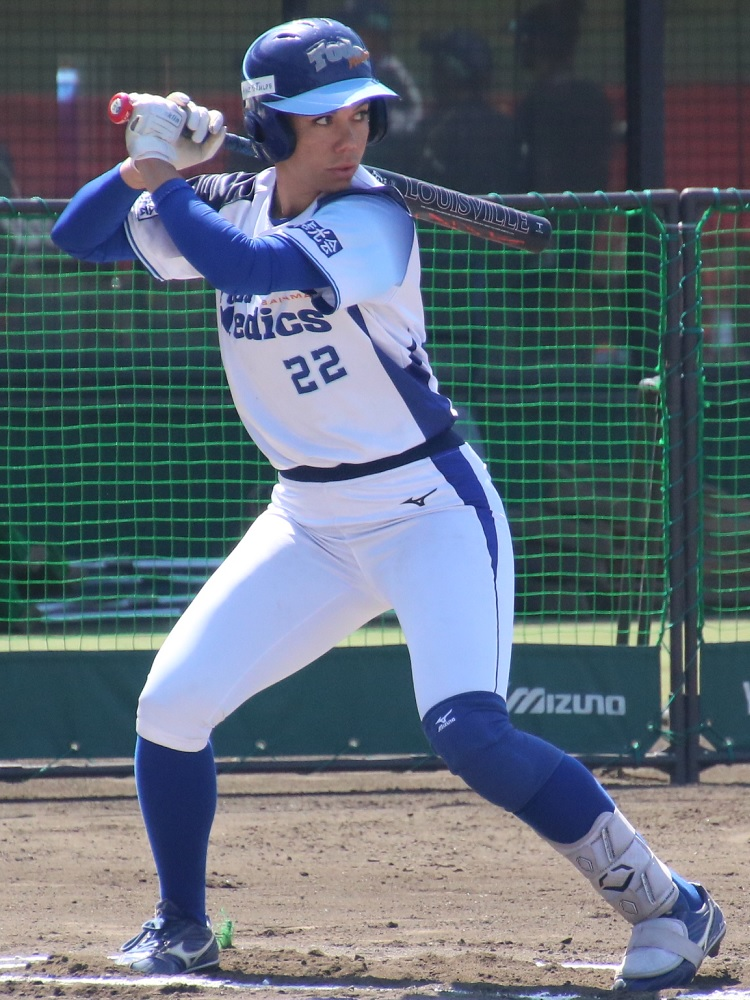
- Jaquish with the Toda Medics in 2024

Utah Talons – No. 27
- Catcher
- Born: January 9, 1995 (age 31); Highland, California, U.S.

Teams
- LSU (2014–2017); Chicago Bandits (2017); USSSA Pride (2018); Texas Smoke (2023); Toda Medics (2024); Utah Talons (2025–present)

Career highlights and awards
- 2× AUSL champion (2025, 2026); All-NPF Team (2017); First team All-American (2017); 2× Second team All-American (2014, 2015); 2× First team All-SEC (2014, 2015); Second team All-SEC (2017); SEC All-freshman team (2014)
Medals
Women's softball
Representing the United States
Pan American Games
Gold medal – first place	2019 Lima	Team
Gold medal – first place	2023 Santiago	Team
World Cup
Silver medal – second place	2024 Castions di Strada	Team
World Games
Gold medal – first place	2025 Chengdu	Team
Representing Puerto Rico
Pan American Games
Bronze medal – third place	2015 Toronto	Team
World Cup of Softball
Bronze medal – third place	2015 Irvine	Team

Sahvanna Marie Jaquish (born January 9, 1995) is an American professional softball player for the Utah Talons of the Athletes Unlimited Softball League (AUSL) and member of the United States women's national softball team. She previously played for the Chicago Bandits and USSSA Pride of the National Pro Fastpitch (NPF), the Texas Smoke of the Women's Professional Fastpitch (WPF) and the Toda Medics of the Japan Diamond Softball League. She played college softball at LSU.

== High school career ==
Jaquish attended Redlands East Valley High School in Redlands, California where she played volleyball and softball. She was named the Citrus Belt League's (CBL) MVP in 2012 and 2013. During her senior year she posted a .548 batting average, with 11 home runs and 48 run batted in (RBI)s.

== College career ==
Jaquish began her college softball career for the LSU Tigers during the 2014 season. During her freshman year she led the team in batting average (.341), home runs (17), RBIs (55), slugging percentage (.699) and total bases (121), ranked second in doubles (9) and on-base percentage (.445) and third in runs scored (40). She broke Leslie Klein's single-season home run record set in 2004. Her 55 RBI were the second-most by a freshman in program history. Following the season she was named to the SEC All-Freshman Team and first team All-SEC.

During the 2015 season, in her sophomore year, she started all 66 games, with 49 starts at third base and 17 starts as a catcher. She hit .318, with 58 hits, 17 home runs, 10 doubles and one triple. She set a single-season program records with 76 RBIs, and 22 multiple RBI games. Following the season she was named to the first team All-SEC for the second consecutive year. During the 2016 season, in her junior year, she started 70 games, with 30 starts at catcher, 17 at first base, 16 at third base and six as the designated player. She ranked third on the team in batting average at .343 and in hits with 69, ranked second on the team with 13 home runs, and led the team with 19 doubles. She tied the program record with 76 RBIs and set a new program record with 23 multiple RBI games.

During the 2017 season, in her senior year, she started all 70 games, she led the team with 61 RBIs, and a .556 slugging-percentage, ranked second on the team with nine home runs, and ranked third on the team with a .331 batting average and in hits with 59. She set a single-season program record with 62 walks. Following the season she was named an NFCA First Team All-American and second team All-SEC. She became the first player in LSU history in the history of the award to earn All-American honors all four years. She finished career with 268 RBI, which ranked first in LSU history and ninth in NCAA history. She also finished in the top five in career slugging percentage, on base percentage, doubles, home runs, RBI, total bases, walks, intentional walks and sacrifice flies.

== Professional career ==
On April 24, 2017, Jaquish was drafted third overall by the Chicago Bandits in the 2017 NPF Draft. During the 2017 season, in her rookie year, she hit .322 with three home runs, 12 doubles and 29 RBIs in 43 games. Following the season she was an at-large selection to the All-NPF team. On January 25, 2018, she was traded from the Bandits to the USSSA Pride in exchange for cash. During the 2018 season, she hit .291 in 20 games.

She then played three seasons in the Athletes Unlimited Pro Softball from 2020 to 2022. During the 2023 season she played for the Texas Smoke of the WPF, and recorded a .253 batting average, with three home runs and 18 RBIs in 31 games. In 2024, she competed internationally with the Toda Medics, and recorded a .260 batting average, with five home runs, and nine RBIs.

On January 29, 2025, Jaquish was drafted in the sixth round, 22nd overall, by the Talons in the inaugural AUSL draft. During the 2025 AUSL season, she hit .143 with three hits, and two RBI, and helped the Talons win the inaugural AUSL championship.

== International career ==
Jaquish made her international debut for Puerto Rico at the 2014 Women's Softball World Championship. She then competed at the 2015 World Cup of Softball and won a bronze medal. She then competed at the 2015 Pan American Games and won a bronze medal.

After competing for Puerto Rico from 2014 until 2016, she then joined the United States women's national softball team. She competed at the 2019 Pan American Games, where she hit .308 with two home runs and six RBIs and won a gold medal. She again competed at the 2023 Pan American Games, where she hit .273 with one home run and four RBIs and won a gold medal.

On April 25, 2025, she was selected to represent the United States at the 2025 World Games.

== Coaching career ==
Jaquish began her coaching career as a volunteer assistant coach at LSU during the 2018 season. She then joined the University of La Verne as an assistant coach in 2019. On June 4, 2020, she was named an assistant coach for Utah Tech during the 2021 season. On August 9, 2022, she was named an assistant coach at Colorado State.

== Personal life ==
Jaquish was born to William and Mary Jaquish, and has two sisters, Carissa and Jenna. Carissa played softball at Notre Dame, and Jenna played at Monmouth.
