= Gwen Svekis =

American softball player (born 1996)

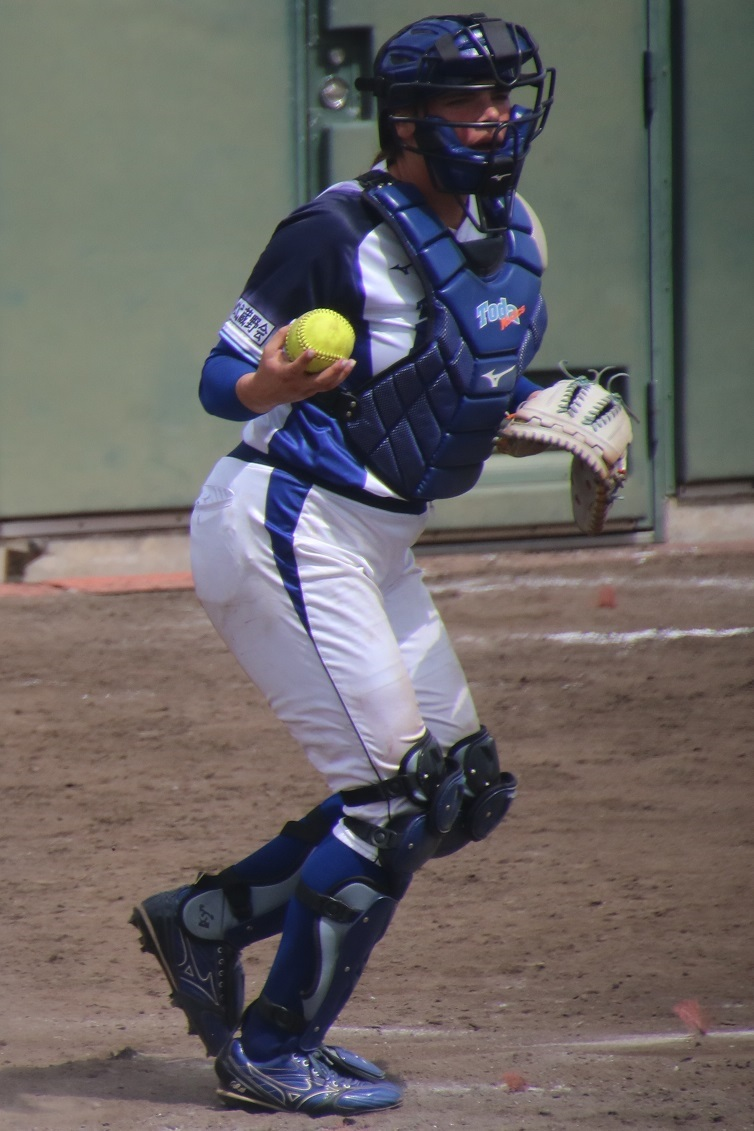

Chicago Bandits
- Catcher
- Born: June 1, 1996 (age 30); Davie, Florida, U.S.

Teams
- Oregon Ducks (2015–2018); Chicago Bandits (2019–present); Toda Medics (2023)

Career highlights and awards
- NFCA Catcher of the Year (2018); All-NPF Team (2019)

Gwen Svekis (born June 1, 1996) is an American former softball player for the Chicago Bandits.

== Career ==
She attended St. Thomas Aquinas High School in Fort Lauderdale, Florida. She later attended the University of Oregon, where she was an All-American catcher and NFCA Catcher of the Year for the Oregon Ducks softball team. Svekis led the Ducks to three Women's College World Series appearances in 2015, 2017 and 2018. She later went on to play professional softball with the Chicago Bandits of National Pro Fastpitch. She played in the inaugural season of Athletes Unlimited Softball league in 2020.

== Personal life ==
Svekis is openly LGBTQ and married fellow softball player Taylor Edwards on 30 June 2025.
