= Taiyo Yuden Solfille =

Japanese women's softball team

Information
- League: JD.League (East Division)
- Location: Takasaki, Gunma, Japan
- Founded: 1984; 41 years ago
- League championships: 6 (1987, 1988, 1989, 1991, 1992, 1993)
- Colors
- Ownership: Taiyo Yuden
- Coach: Noriko Yamaji
- Website: Official website

The Taiyo Yuden Solfille (太陽誘電ソルフィーユ, Taiyō Yūden Sorufīyu) are a Japanese women's softball team based in Takasaki, Gunma. The Solfille compete in the Japan Diamond Softball League (JD.League) as a member of the league's East Division.

== History ==
The Solfille were founded in 1984, as Taiyo Yuden softball team.

The Japan Diamond Softball League (JD.League) was founded in 2022, and the Solfille became part of the new league as a member of the East Division.

== Roster ==
As of April 2022

Position	No.	Name	Age	Height	Bats	Throws	Notes
Players
Pitchers	1	(Japan) Ayu Terada	age 27	164 cm (5 ft 5 in)	Left	Left	
Pitchers	13	(Japan) Hanna Sone	age 25	167 cm (5 ft 6 in)	Left	Left	
Pitchers	17	(Japan) Miki Endo	age 26	162 cm (5 ft 4 in)	Left	Right	
Pitchers	18	(Japan) Konomi Uno	age 21	167 cm (5 ft 6 in)	Left	Right	
Catchers	2	(Japan) Shizuku Nishiyama	age 26	167 cm (5 ft 6 in)	Right	Right	
Catchers	4	(Japan) Minami Sato	age 35	159 cm (5 ft 3 in)	Right	Right	
Catchers	7	(Japan) Fu Kojima	age 26	159 cm (5 ft 3 in)	Right	Right	
Catchers	55	(Japan) Aiko Kamibayashi	age 22	163 cm (5 ft 4 in)	Right	Right	
Infielders	3	(Japan) Haruka Nagatomo	age 29	168 cm (5 ft 6 in)	Right	Right	
Infielders	5	(Japan) Kotomi Takeda	age 24	160 cm (5 ft 3 in)	Left	Right	
Infielders	9	(Japan) Sayaka Momma	age 28	163 cm (5 ft 4 in)	Right	Right	
Infielders	10	(Japan) Yui Nakamizo (c)	age 26	159 cm (5 ft 3 in)	Right	Right	
Infielders	11	(Japan) Makoto Suda	age 27	159 cm (5 ft 3 in)	Left	Right	
Infielders	14	(Japan) Suzune Moro	age 22	155 cm (5 ft 1 in)	Left	Right	
Infielders	15	(Japan) Rui Nakamura	age 22	159 cm (5 ft 3 in)	Right	Right	
Infielders	25	(Japan) Mei Hashimoto	age 26	160 cm (5 ft 3 in)	Left	Right	
Outfielders	6	(Japan) Eri Matsuki	age 32	163 cm (5 ft 4 in)	Left	Right	
Outfielders	8	(Japan) Nodoka Harada	age 33	163 cm (5 ft 4 in)	Right	Right	Competed in Olympics 2020
Outfielders	24	(Japan) Rino Setoguchi	age 25	153 cm (5 ft 0 in)	Left	Right	
Outfielders	51	(Japan) Karen Kinoshita	age 23	162 cm (5 ft 4 in)	Left	Right	
Coaches
Manager	30	(Japan) Noriko Yamaji	age 54	–	–	–	
Coaches	31	(Japan) Miyuki Ito	age 41	–	–	–	
Coaches	32	(Japan) Haruka Yamamoto	age 34	–	–	–	
