= NEC Platforms Red Falcons =

Japanese women's softball team

Information
- League: JD.League (East Division)
- Location: Kakegawa, Shizuoka, Japan
- Founded: 1983; 42 years ago
- Colors
- Ownership: NEC Platforms (NEC Group)
- Coach: Kasumi Mizoe
- Website: Official website

The NEC Platforms Red Falcons (NECプラットフォームズレッドファルコンズ, Enu-Ī-Shī Purattofōmuzu Reddo Farukonzu) are a Japanese women's softball team based in Kakegawa, Shizuoka. The Red Falcons compete in the Japan Diamond Softball League (JD.League) as a member of the league's East Division.

== History ==
The Red Falcons were founded in 1983, as NEC Shizuoka (a factory of NEC) softball team.

The Japan Diamond Softball League (JD.League) was founded in 2022, and the Red Falcons became part of the new league as a member of the East Division.

== Roster ==
As of April 2022

Position	No.	Name	Age	Height	Bats	Throws	Notes
Players
Pitchers	11	(Japan) Akane Takayama	age 21	180 cm (5 ft 11 in)	Left	Right	
Pitchers	14	(Japan) Mizuki Yokotani	age 26	157 cm (5 ft 2 in)	Right	Right	
Pitchers	15	(Japan) Minami Imamura	age 26	164 cm (5 ft 5 in)	Right	Right	
Pitchers	16	(Japan) Sayuri Terasawa	age 28	169 cm (5 ft 7 in)	Left	Right	
Pitchers	18	(Japan) Arina Oba	age 27	164 cm (5 ft 5 in)	Left	Left	
Catchers	8	(Japan) Ayane Sakamoto	age 26	160 cm (5 ft 3 in)	Right	Right	
Catchers	22	(Japan) Suzuka Hisaeda	age 23	163 cm (5 ft 4 in)	Right	Right	
Infielders	1	(Japan) Annu Kakuno	age 27	160 cm (5 ft 3 in)	Right	Right	
Infielders	3	(Japan) Saaya Mine	age 27	160 cm (5 ft 3 in)	Left	Right	
Infielders	5	(Japan) Minori Takeuchi	age 25	169 cm (5 ft 7 in)	Right	Right	
Infielders	6	(Japan) Natsuki Kawai	age 26	158 cm (5 ft 2 in)	Left	Right	
Infielders	9	(Japan) Yuka Sato	age 25	172 cm (5 ft 8 in)	Left	Right	
Infielders	10	(Japan) Shiori Shimizu (c)	age 29	168 cm (5 ft 6 in)	Right	Right	
Infielders	21	(Japan) Iroha Suwa	age 26	169 cm (5 ft 7 in)	Right	Right	
Infielders	24	(Japan) Saya Matsumoto	age 23	160 cm (5 ft 3 in)	Right	Right	
Infielders	25	(Japan) Himari Murata	age 25	164 cm (5 ft 5 in)	Left	Right	
Infielders	27	(Japan) Amane Kanai	age 23	160 cm (5 ft 3 in)	Left	Right	
Infielders	28	(Japan) Rena Nakano	age 23	157 cm (5 ft 2 in)	Right	Right	
Outfielders	7	(Japan) Yui Ogawara	age 29	163 cm (5 ft 4 in)	Left	Right	
Outfielders	12	(Japan) Yuzuha Bundo	age 25	159 cm (5 ft 3 in)	Right	Right	
Outfielders	19	(Japan) Hinami Hara	age 22	170 cm (5 ft 7 in)	Left	Right	
Outfielders	29	(Japan) Miki Fukushima	age 21	165 cm (5 ft 5 in)	Right	Right	
Coaches
Manager	30	(Japan) Kasumi Mizoe	age 39	–	–	–	
Coaches	31	(Japan) Hitomi Sasaki	age 39	–	–	–	
Coaches	32	(Japan) Shiho Yamanaka	age 33	–	–	–	
