= Toyota Red Terriers =

Japanese women's softball team

- Logo

Information
- League: JD.League (West Division)
- Location: Toyota, Aichi, Japan
- Founded: 1948; 78 years ago
- League championships: 14 (1969-A (Note: In 1968, 1969 and 1971 seasons, the spring (S) and autumn (A) tournament were held.), 1970, 1974, 1984, 2010, 2011, 2012, 2014, 2016, 2018, 2023, 2024, 2025, 2026)
- Colors: Red and black
- Ownership: Toyota
- Coach: Sachiko Baba
- Website: Official website

The Toyota Red Terriers (トヨタレッドテリアーズ, Toyota Reddo Teriāzu) are a Japanese women's softball team based in Toyota, Aichi. The Red Terriers compete in the Japan Diamond Softball League (JD.League) as a member of the league's West Division.

== History ==
The Red Terriers were founded in 1948, as the Toyota Motor Corporation softball team. The team joined the Japan Softball League in 1960.

The Japan Diamond Softball League (JD.League) was founded in 2022, and the Red Terriers became part of the new league as a member of the West Division.

== Roster ==
As of December 2024

Position	No.	Name	Age	Height	Bats	Throws	Notes
Players
Pitchers	14	(Japan) Mana Marumoto	age 22	1.68 m (5 ft 6 in)	Right	Right	
Pitchers	18	(Japan) Miu Goto	age 25	1.73 m (5 ft 8 in)	Left	Left	Competed in Olympics 2020
Pitchers	27	(Japan) Sayuki Ishido	age 23	1.70 m (5 ft 7 in)	Left	Right	
Pitchers	80	(United States) Megan Faraimo	age 26	1.83 m (6 ft 0 in)	Right	Right	
Catchers	2	(Japan) Nanako Fujiie	age 28	1.63 m (5 ft 4 in)	Right	Right	
Catchers	6	(Japan) Hina Ichikawa	age 25	1.68 m (5 ft 6 in)	Right	Right	
Catchers	20	(Japan) Yume Kiriishi	age 26	1.72 m (5 ft 7 1/2 in)	Right	Right	
Infielders	1	(Japan) Kyoko Ishikawa	age 30	1.58 m (5 ft 2 in)	Left	Right	
Infielders	3	(Japan) Eri Shimoyama	age 27	1.66 m (5 ft 5 1/2 in)	Right	Right	
Infielders	5	(Japan) Ryoko Kataoka	age 26	1.60 m (5 ft 3 in)	Left	Left	
Infielders	8	(Japan) Moa Sawada	age 27	1.66 m (5 ft 5 1/2 in)	Left	Right	
Infielders	10	(Japan) Yuki Kamata (captain)	age 30	1.62 m (5 ft 4 in)	Left	Right	
Infielders	11	(Japan) Soa Shimanaka	age 21	1.58 m (5 ft 2 in)	Right	Left	
Infielders	12	(Japan) Ikue Funasaka	age 26	1.63 m (5 ft 4 in)	Right	Left	
Infielders	13	(Japan) Miku Goto	age 23	1.67 m (5 ft 5 1/2 in)	Right	Right	
Infielders	22	(Japan) Ayumi Takashima	age 25	1.70 m (5 ft 7 in)	Right	Right	
Outfielders	4	(Japan) Nodoka Harada	age 35	1.63 m (5 ft 4 in)	Right	Right	
Outfielders	9	(Japan) Satomi Kado	age 25	1.60 m (5 ft 3 in)	Right	Left	
Outfielders	16	(Japan) Nana Iha	age 27	1.58 m (5 ft 2 in)	Left	Right	
Outfielders	17	(Japan) Mana Morioka	age 27	1.64 m (5 ft 4 1/2 in)	Left	Right	
Outfielders	25	(Japan) Yuzuki Yamada	age 24	1.65 m (5 ft 5 in)	Left	Right	
Coaches
Manager	30	(Japan) Sachiko Baba	age 51	–	–	–	
Coaches	31	(Japan) Haruna Sakamoto	age 39	–	–	–	
Coaches	32	(Japan) Ryoka Kamiya	age 35	–	–	–	
