= NSK Brave Bearies =

Japanese women's softball team

Information
- League: JD.League (West Division)
- Location: Konan, Shiga, Japan
- Founded: 1972; 53 years ago
- League championships: 1 (1985)
- Colors
- Ownership: NSK
- Coach: Takayuki Morisawa
- Website: Official website

The NSK Brave Bearies (日本精工ブレイブベアリーズ, Nippon Seikō Bureibu Bearīzu) are a Japanese women's softball team based in Konan, Shiga. The Brave Bearies compete in the Japan Diamond Softball League (JD.League) as a member of the league's West Division.

== History ==
The Brave Bearies were founded in 1972, as NSK softball team.

The Japan Diamond Softball League (JD.League) was founded in 2022, and the Brave Bearies became part of the new league as a member of the West Division.

== Roster ==
As of April 2022

| Position | No. | Name | Age | Height | Bats | Throws | Notes |
Players
| Pitchers | 16 | (Japan) Akane Arimoto | age 25 | 163 cm (5 ft 4 in) | Left | Right | |
| Pitchers | 19 | (Japan) Nanami Kurihara | age 21 | 173 cm (5 ft 8 in) | Left | Right | |
| Pitchers | 20 | (Japan) Reina Yamada | age 27 | 155 cm (5 ft 1 in) | Right | Right | |
| Pitchers | 29 | (Japan) Asuka Goto | age 25 | 163 cm (5 ft 4 in) | Right | Right | |
| Catchers | 2 | (Japan) Hanako Shigeishi | age 27 | 159 cm (5 ft 3 in) | Left | Left | |
| Catchers | 25 | (Japan) Utano Kuwabata | age 26 | 163 cm (5 ft 4 in) | Right | Right | |
| Infielders | 1 | (Japan) Yuzuki Sawa | age 24 | 161 cm (5 ft 3 in) | Right | Right | |
| Infielders | 4 | (Japan) Yumi Sudo | age 26 | 159 cm (5 ft 3 in) | Right | Right | |
| Infielders | 5 | (Japan) Mika Kuroki | age 25 | 157 cm (5 ft 2 in) | Left | Right | |
| Infielders | 6 | (Japan) Marumi Minakata | age 26 | 160 cm (5 ft 3 in) | Left | Right | |
| Infielders | 8 | (Japan) Imari Uehara | age 31 | 158 cm (5 ft 2 in) | Left | Right | |
| Infielders | 10 | (Japan) Honoka Matsuo (c) | age 28 | 162 cm (5 ft 4 in) | Left | Right | |
| Infielders | 11 | (Japan) Yuka Matsumoto | age 30 | 151 cm (4 ft 11 in) | Left | Right | |
| Infielders | 15 | (Japan) Kazusa Kubo | age 25 | 166 cm (5 ft 5 in) | Right | Right | |
| Infielders | 24 | (Japan) Riho Okada | age 27 | 159 cm (5 ft 3 in) | Left | Right | |
| Outfielders | 7 | (Japan) Ibuki Oho | age 22 | 159 cm (5 ft 3 in) | Left | Right | |
| Outfielders | 9 | (Japan) Ruri Tanaka | age 31 | 158 cm (5 ft 2 in) | Left | Right | |
| Outfielders | 17 | (Japan) Yuri Takahara | age 30 | 160 cm (5 ft 3 in) | Left | Right | |
| Outfielders | 21 | (Japan) Miki Miyamura | age 22 | 161 cm (5 ft 3 in) | Left | Right | |
| Outfielders | 26 | (Japan) Aika Sakai | age 23 | 162 cm (5 ft 4 in) | Left | Right | |
Coaches
| Manager | 30 | (Japan) Takayuki Morisawa | age 58 | – | – | – | |
| Coaches | 31 | (Japan) Nana Tanabe | age 36 | – | – | – | |
| Coaches | 32 | (Japan) Saki Nagamizo | age 34 | – | – | – | |
