= Kaia Parnaby =

Australian softball player

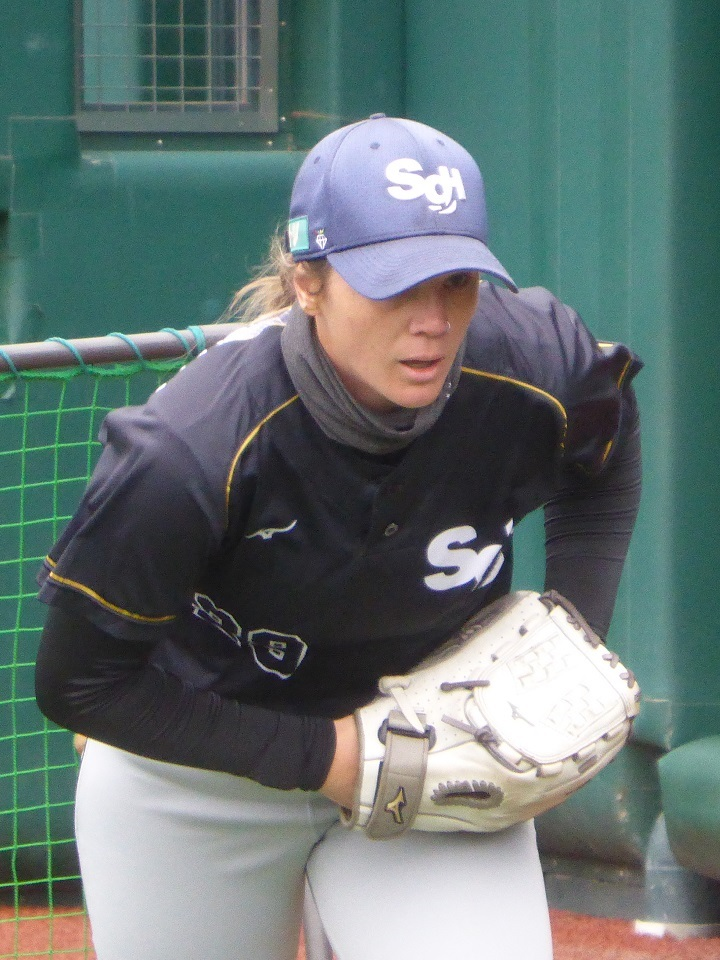

Personal information
- Nationality: Australian
- Born: New South Wales, Australia
- Height: 5 ft 7 in (170 cm)

Sport
- Country: Australia
- Sport: Softball
- Event: Women's team
- College team: University of Hawaiʻi at Mānoa
- Club: North Shore District Softball Association
- Team: SGH Galaxy Stars (2014–present)

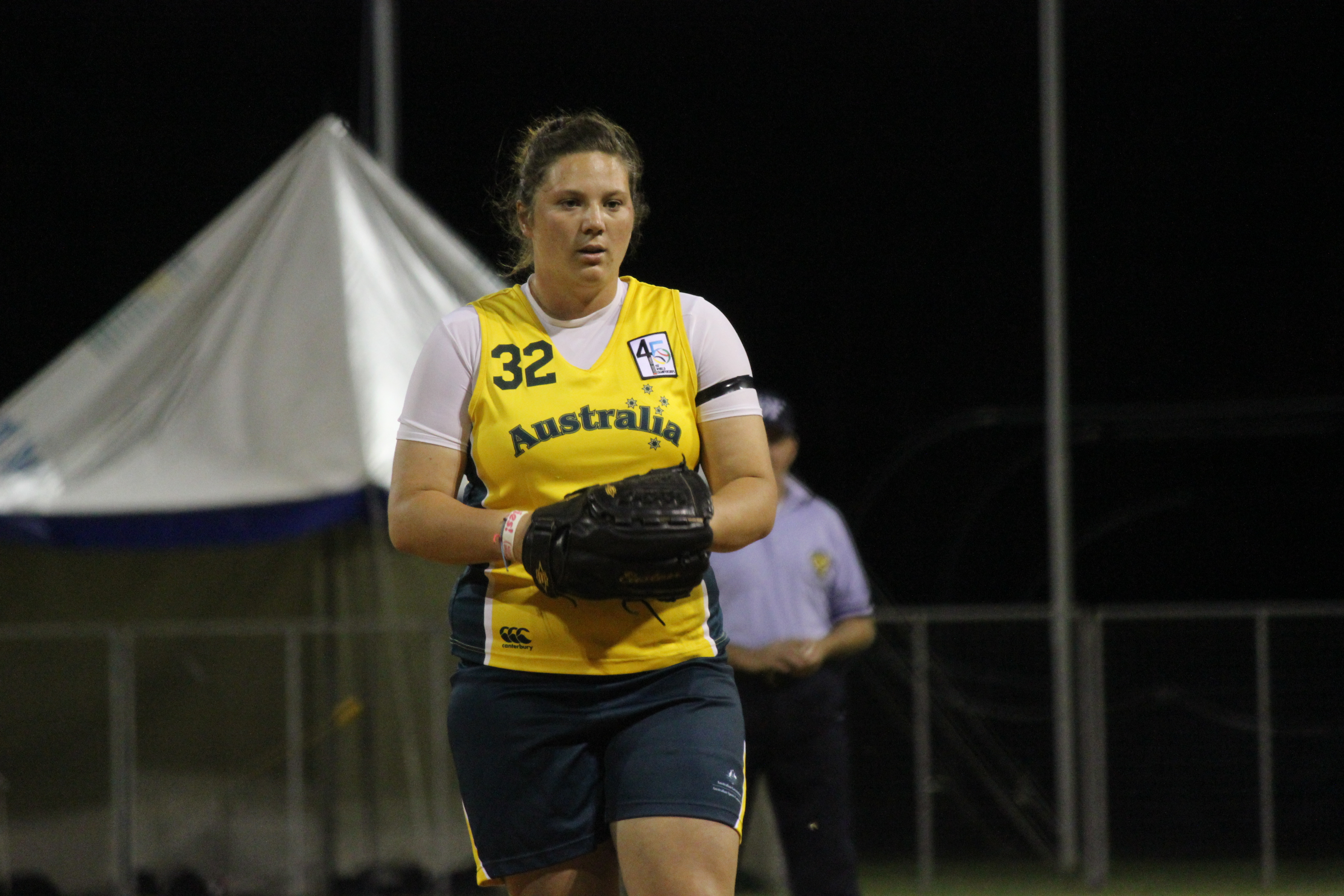
Parnaby with the Australia national team in 2012

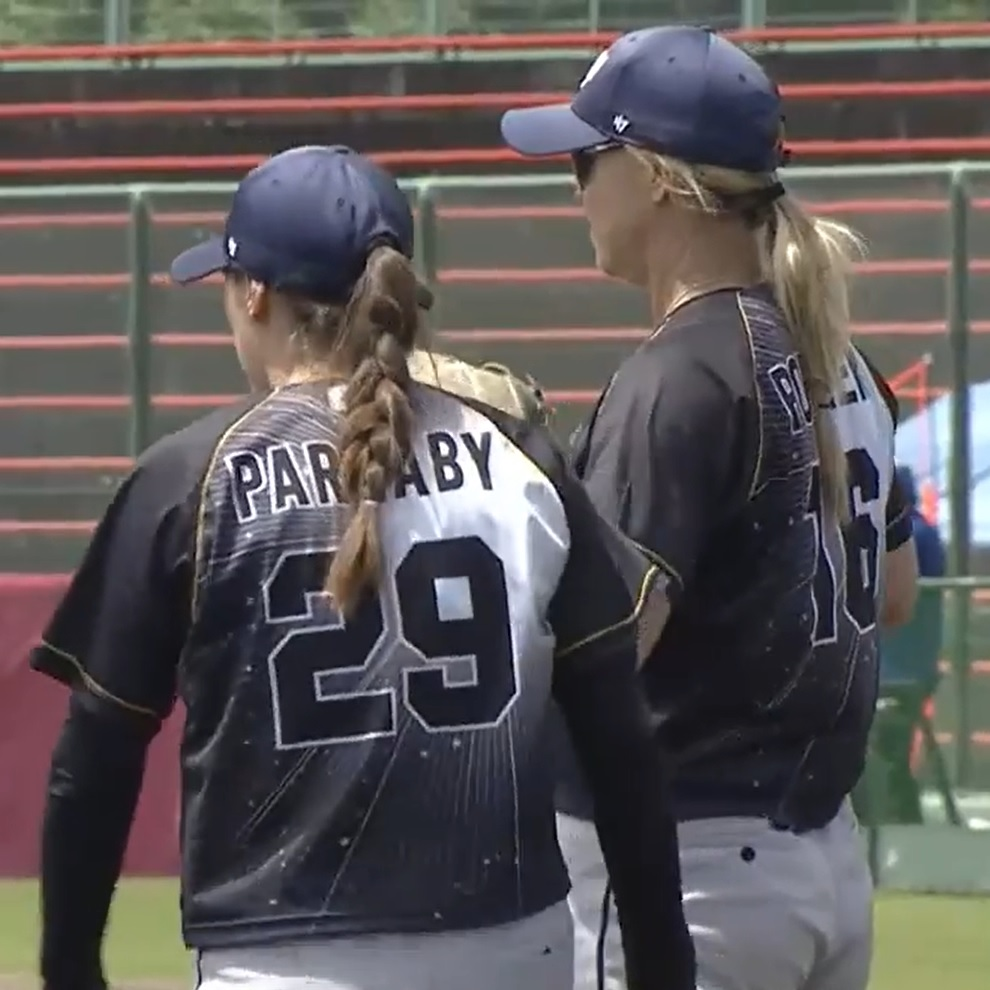
Parnaby and Porter with the Galaxy Stars in 2023

Kaia Parnaby (born July 14, 1990) is an Australian, former collegiate All-American, 2020 Olympian, left-handed professional softball pitcher, originally from Sydney. She is a pitcher and earned a scholarship to and played for the Australian Institute of Sport. She played university softball for the Hawaii Rainbow Wahine team in the Big West Conference where she was recognized as all-conference and the 2013 Pitcher of The Year. She also helped them to their first-ever appearance at the 2010 Women's College World Series. She also played for the Aussie Peppers, a traveling team affiliate in the National Pro Fastpitch. She is a member of the senior Australia women's national softball team and played in the 2020 Summer Olympics.

== Personal ==
Parnaby is from New South Wales. She attended Narrabeen Sports High School and NBSC Freshwater Senior Campus. She currently attends the University of Hawaiʻi at Mānoa. In 2011/2012, she was a junior.

== Softball ==
Parnaby is a pitcher, and plays in relief. She started out playing softball for Manly Warringah Softball Association. In 2004, she was named to the New South Wales U16 team. In 2006, she was named to the Australian All Schools team. In 2006, she represented Australia on the junior national U19 team. She had a scholarship with and played for the Australian Institute of Sport (AIS) in 2006. She was the first player from Manly Warringah Softball Association to earn a spot on the AIS roster. In 2006, she played for the New South Wales side that won the Australian All Schools Softball Championship.
Parnaby transferred to North Shore District Softball Association in 2007 joining their Open Women's and State League teams. In 2009, she was again with and played for the AIS team.

=== Senior national team ===
Parnaby has been a member of the senior Australia women's national softball team. In March 2009, she participated in a Brisbane-based training camp. In 2011, she was a member of the Australian side that competed at the World Cup of Softball. She played in the 8–0 loss to the United States. She is a member of the 2012 Australia women's national softball team and is on the short list to compete at the 2012 ISF XIII Women's World Championships .

Parnaby was named to the roster for the Tokyo Olympic games. She went 1–2 for Team Australia, tossing 13 innings and surrendering 13 hits, 6 earned runs for a 3.23 ERA and 1.15 WHIP, also totaling two walks and struck out 7. The team placed fifth and did not medal for the first time in softball at the Olympics. Full details are in Australia at the 2020 Summer Olympics.

=== University ===
Parnaby plays for the University of Hawaiʻi at Mānoa in the United States. She played with the team during the 2010, 2011 and the 2012 season. In February 2012, her team played the UMKC Kangaroos but she did not pitch in the game. In a March 2012 game in the Bank of Hawaii Invitational against Radford University, she struck out eight players and limited them to three hits in a 7–0 victory for her team. At the time, her team was ranked twenty-second in the nation and went on to win the Invitational. Their record to the season went to 17–0 with Parnaby having a 7–0-record season to date.

== Career statistics ==
Hawaii Rainbow Wahine
YEAR	W	L	GP	GS	CG	SHO	SV	IP	H	R	ER	BB	SO	ERA	WHIP
2010	19	6	35	27	19	6	2	172.2	169	86	76	46	193	3.09	1.25
2011	12	6	20	17	15	4	1	114.2	77	31	21	33	135	1.28	0.96
2012	16	3	23	21	16	9	0	124.0	86	38	27	25	124	1.52	0.89
2013	39	7	50	47	39	13	2	312.2	233	89	68	51	342	1.14	0.91
TOTALS	86	22	128	112	89	32	5	724.0	565	244	192	155	794	1.85	0.99
