= Shionogi Rainbow Stokes Hyogo =

Japanese women's softball team

Information
- League: JD.League (West Division)
- Location: Amagasaki, Hyogo, Japan
- Founded: 1949; 76 years ago
- League championships: 1 (1975)
- Colors
- Ownership: Shionogi
- Coach: Masako Okamura
- Website: Official website

The Shionogi Rainbow Stokes Hyogo (シオノギレインボーストークス兵庫, Shionogi Reimbō Sutōkusu Hyōgo) are a Japanese women's softball team based in Amagasaki, Hyogo. The Rainbow Stokes compete in the Japan Diamond Softball League (JD.League) as a member of the league's West Division.

== History ==
The Rainbow Stokes were founded in 1949, as Shionogi softball team.

The Japan Diamond Softball League (JD.League) was founded in 2022, and the Rainbow Stokes became part of the new league as a member of the West Division.

== Roster ==
As of April 2022

Position	No.	Name	Age	Height	Bats	Throws	Notes
Players
Pitchers	18	(Japan) Akane Koji	age 23	170 cm (5 ft 7 in)	Left	Right	
Pitchers	19	(Japan) Sana Nobuta	age 26	168 cm (5 ft 6 in)	Right	Right	
Pitchers	20	(Japan) Sakimi Chiba	age 29	172 cm (5 ft 8 in)	Left	Left	
Pitchers	27	(Japan) Yura Horimoto	age 21	174 cm (5 ft 9 in)	Left	Right	
Pitchers	29	(Japan) Asaka Yoshii	age 28	157 cm (5 ft 2 in)	Left	Right	
Catchers	2	(Japan) Hina Ujimaru	age 26	159 cm (5 ft 3 in)	Right	Right	
Catchers	5	(Japan) Shino Satake	age 26	166 cm (5 ft 5 in)	Right	Right	
Catchers	7	(Japan) Mai Tajima	age 24	160 cm (5 ft 3 in)	Left	Right	
Infielders	1	(Japan) Otoha Murabayashi	age 23	168 cm (5 ft 6 in)	Right	Right	
Infielders	3	(Japan) Marie Kubota	age 27	156 cm (5 ft 1 in)	Left	Right	
Infielders	6	(Japan) Yumi Koto	age 29	163 cm (5 ft 4 in)	Right	Right	
Infielders	8	(Japan) Emu Kato	age 29	160 cm (5 ft 3 in)	Left	Right	
Infielders	10	(Japan) Seina Yokono (c)	age 31	167 cm (5 ft 6 in)	Right	Right	
Infielders	14	(Japan) Miku Tomura	age 30	154 cm (5 ft 1 in)	Left	Right	
Infielders	16	(Japan) Kyoka Sakamoto	age 21	157 cm (5 ft 2 in)	Right	Right	
Infielders	23	(Japan) Honoka Shiraishi	age 25	166 cm (5 ft 5 in)	Right	Right	
Outfielders	9	(Japan) Minami Nakamura	age 25	165 cm (5 ft 5 in)	Left	Right	
Outfielders	17	(Japan) Saki Ozawa	age 26	154 cm (5 ft 1 in)	Left	Left	
Outfielders	21	(Japan) Nana Tanimoto	age 26	160 cm (5 ft 3 in)	Left	Right	
Outfielders	22	(Japan) Akane Ohashi	age 25	161 cm (5 ft 3 in)	Left	Left	
Outfielders	25	(Japan) Miyabi Migita	age 21	163 cm (5 ft 4 in)	Left	Right	
Outfielders	28	(Japan) Misaki Kobayashi	age 26	163 cm (5 ft 4 in)	Left	Right	
Coaches
Manager	30	(Japan) Masako Okamura	age 66	–	–	–	
Coaches	31	(Japan) Ayaka Takebayashi	age 37	–	–	–	
