= Yume Kiriishi =

Japanese softball player

Toyota Red Terriers – No. 20
- Catcher
- Born: 12 December 1999 (age 26); Chiba Prefecture, Japan
- Bats: Right Throws: Right
Medals
Women's softball
Representing Japan
World Cup
| Gold medal – first place | 2024 Castions di Strada | Team |
Asian Games
| Gold medal – first place | 2022 Hangzhou | Team |
| Gold medal – first place | 2026 Aichi–Nagoya | Team |

Yume Kiriishi (Japanese: 切石 結女, Kiriishi Yume; born 12 December 1999) is a Japanese softball player who plays as a catcher for the Toyota Red Terriers and the Japan women's national softball team. She has won gold medals at the 2022 Asian Games, the 2024 Women's Softball World Cup and the 2026 Asian Games.

== Career ==
Kiriishi attended Chiba Keizai University High School in Chiba Prefecture and joined Toyota's women's softball team. She plays as a catcher, bats right-handed and throws right-handed. She has competed for Toyota in Japan's domestic softball competitions and has represented Japan at international tournaments.

Kiriishi represented Japan at the 2022 Asian Games, held in Hangzhou in 2023 after being postponed because of the COVID-19 pandemic. Japan won the women's softball tournament, defeating China in the final to secure the gold medal. Kiriishi was part of the Japanese team that won the tournament.

In July 2024, Kiriishi played for Japan at the final stage of the 2024 Women's Softball World Cup in Castions di Strada, Italy. She started as catcher in the championship final against the United States on 21 July. Japan won 6–1, with Kiriishi contributing a run-scoring double during the game. The victory gave Japan its fourth Women's Softball World Cup title.

Kiriishi was selected for Japan's women's softball team at the 2026 Asian Games in Aichi and Nagoya. Japan won all seven of its preliminary-round games to reach the final against China on 3 October 2026. Kiriishi was part of the squad that won the final 7–0 in five innings, securing Japan's seventh consecutive Asian Games gold medal in women's softball and her second Asian Games gold medal.
