= Iyo Bank Vertz =

Japanese women's softball team

Information
- League: JD.League (West Division)
- Location: Matsuyama, Ehime, Japan
- Founded: 1985; 40 years ago
- Colors
- Ownership: Iyo Bank
- Coach: Risa Akimoto
- Website: Official website

The Iyo Bank Vertz (伊予銀行ヴェールズ, Iyo Ginkō Vēruzu) are a Japanese women's softball team based in Matsuyama, Ehime. The Vertz compete in the Japan Diamond Softball League (JD.League) as a member of the league's West Division.

== History ==
The Vertz were founded in 1985, as Iyo Bank softball team.

The Japan Diamond Softball League (JD.League) was founded in 2022, and the Vertz became part of the new league as a member of the West Division.

== Roster ==
As of April 2022

Position	No.	Name	Age	Height	Bats	Throws	Notes
Players
Pitchers	5	(Japan) Nana Shoji	age 29	163 cm (5 ft 4 in)	Right	Right	
Pitchers	14	(Japan) Koharu Sunaga	age 21	168 cm (5 ft 6 in)	Left	Left	
Pitchers	18	(Japan) Minori Kuroki	age 27	170 cm (5 ft 7 in)	Right	Right	
Catchers	12	(Japan) Hiromi Yasukawa	age 27	160 cm (5 ft 3 in)	Left	Right	
Catchers	27	(Japan) Marin Hiromitsu	age 25	160 cm (5 ft 3 in)	Right	Right	
Infielders	1	(Japan) Mizuki Iida	age 28	155 cm (5 ft 1 in)	Left	Right	
Infielders	3	(Japan) Mizuki Inoue	age 25	165 cm (5 ft 5 in)	Left	Left	
Infielders	4	(Japan) Ayana Asaishi	age 30	158 cm (5 ft 2 in)	Right	Right	
Infielders	10	(Japan) Hazuki Kai (c)	age 29	158 cm (5 ft 2 in)	Right	Right	
Infielders	20	(Japan) Akiko Yoshikane	age 23	151 cm (4 ft 11 in)	Right	Right	
Infielders	25	(Japan) Ami Takikawa	age 21	156 cm (5 ft 1 in)	Left	Right	
Infielders	26	(United States) Lisa Maulden	age 32	171 cm (5 ft 7 in)	Left	Right	
Infielders	29	(Japan) Minami Tsujii	age 26	167 cm (5 ft 6 in)	Right	Right	
Outfielders	7	(Japan) Sayaka Matsuse	age 28	163 cm (5 ft 4 in)	Left	Right	
Outfielders	9	(Japan) Kiho Homma	age 29	170 cm (5 ft 7 in)	Right	Right	
Outfielders	11	(Japan) Yuka Iuchi	age 27	169 cm (5 ft 7 in)	Left	Right	
Outfielders	15	(Japan) Kaede Tsubouchi	age 21	161 cm (5 ft 3 in)	Left	Right	
Outfielders	17	(Japan) Risa Okazaki	age 26	165 cm (5 ft 5 in)	Left	Right	
Outfielders	28	(Japan) Mana Kawaguchi	age 26	162 cm (5 ft 4 in)	Left	Right	
Coaches
Manager	30	(Japan) Risa Akimoto	age 43	–	–	–	
Coaches	31	(Japan) Terumi Yano	age 40	–	–	–	
