= SGH Galaxy Stars =

Japanese women's softball team

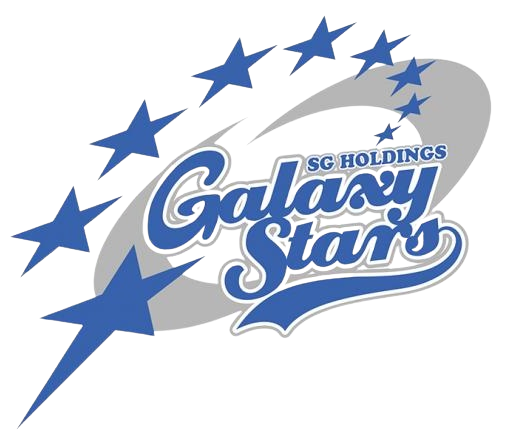
- Logo

Information
- League: JD.League (West Division)
- Location: Kyoto, Kyoto, Japan
- Founded: 2005; 21 years ago (1986 as Miki House)
- Colors
- Ownership: SG Holdings
- Coach: Ai Kato
- Website: Official website

The SGH Galaxy Stars (SGホールディングスギャラクシースターズ, Esu-Jī Hōrudingusu Gyarakushī Sutāzu) are a Japanese women's softball team based in Kyoto, Kyoto. The Galaxy Stars compete in the Japan Diamond Softball League (JD.League) as a member of the league's West Division.

== History ==
The Galaxy Stars were founded in 1986, as Miki House softball team. The team was transferred to Sagawa (current SG Holdings) in 2005.

The Japan Diamond Softball League (JD.League) was founded in 2022, and the Galaxy Stars became part of the new league as a member of the West Division.

== Roster ==
As of April 2022

| Position | No. | Name | Age | Height | Bats | Throws | Notes |
Players
| Pitchers | 11 | (Japan) Akane Namiki | age 30 | 168 cm (5 ft 6 in) | Right | Right | |
| Pitchers | 15 | (Japan) Moe Niwa | age 28 | 162 cm (5 ft 4 in) | Left | Left | |
| Pitchers | 18 | (Japan) Chisora Mihara | age 27 | 166 cm (5 ft 5 in) | Right | Right | |
| Pitchers | 21 | (Japan) Nanami Sugawara | age 23 | 165 cm (5 ft 5 in) | Right | Right | |
| Pitchers | 29 | (Australia) Kaia Parnaby | age 36 | 170 cm (5 ft 7 in) | Left | Left | Competed in Olympics 2020 |
| Pitchers | 81 | (Italy) Greta Cecchetti | age 37 | 183 cm (6 ft 0 in) | Right | Right | Competed in Olympics 2020 |
| Catchers | 8 | (Japan) Mayu Fujihara | age 27 | 159 cm (5 ft 3 in) | Left | Right | |
| Catchers | 9 | (Japan) Risa Soma | age 29 | 170 cm (5 ft 7 in) | Right | Right | |
| Catchers | 20 | (Japan) Marina Yamashina | age 36 | 161 cm (5 ft 3 in) | Right | Right | |
| Catchers | 34 | (Italy) Erika Piancastelli | age 30 | 175 cm (5 ft 9 in) | Right | Right | Competed in Olympics 2020 |
| Infielders | 1 | (Japan) Mako Takahashi | age 28 | 163 cm (5 ft 4 in) | Left | Right | |
| Infielders | 2 | (Japan) Akari Yamamoto | age 25 | 156 cm (5 ft 1 in) | Left | Right | |
| Infielders | 4 | (Japan) Yuka Okuni | age 27 | 160 cm (5 ft 3 in) | Right | Right | |
| Infielders | 7 | (Japan) Yuki Yanase | age 36 | 159 cm (5 ft 3 in) | Right | Right | Player-coach |
| Infielders | 10 | (Japan) Mahiro Takahashi (c) | age 26 | 159 cm (5 ft 3 in) | Right | Right | |
| Infielders | 16 | (Australia) Stacey Porter | age 44 | 179 cm (5 ft 10 in) | Right | Right | Competed in Olympics 2004, 2008 and 2020 |
| Infielders | 17 | (Japan) Ayami Konishi | age 26 | 172 cm (5 ft 8 in) | Left | Right | |
| Infielders | 19 | (Japan) Haruka Matsui | age 31 | 155 cm (5 ft 1 in) | Right | Right | |
| Outfielders | 5 | (Japan) Saki Kogure | age 27 | 159 cm (5 ft 3 in) | Right | Right | |
| Outfielders | 25 | (Japan) Hikari Nakamura | age 31 | 156 cm (5 ft 1 in) | Left | Right | |
| Outfielders | 27 | (Japan) Yuri Tobaru | age 28 | 165 cm (5 ft 5 in) | Right | Right | |
Coaches
| Manager | 30 | (Japan) Ai Kato | age 43 | – | – | – | |
| Coaches | 7 | (Japan) Yuki Yanase | age 36 | – | – | – | Player-coach |
