= Bic Camera Takasaki Bee Queen =

Japanese women's softball team

Information
- League: JD.League (East Division)
- Location: Takasaki, Gunma, Japan
- Founded: 2015; 11 years ago (1981 as Hitachi Takasaki)
- League championships: 15 (1990, 1995, 1997, 2002, 2003, 2005, 2008, 2009, 2013, 2015, 2017, 2019, 2020, 2021, 2022)
- Colors
- Ownership: Bic Camera
- Coach: Yumi Iwabuchi
- Website: Official website

The Bic Camera Takasaki Bee Queen (ビックカメラ高崎ビークイーン, Bikku Kamera Takasaki Bī Kuīn) are a Japanese women's softball team based in Takasaki, Gunma. The Bee Queen competes in the Japan Diamond Softball League (JD.League) as a member of the league's East Division.

== History ==
The Bee Queen were founded in 1981, as Hitachi Takasaki (a factory of Hitachi) softball team. The team was transferred to Renesas in 2003, and was transferred to Bic Camera in 2015.

The Japan Diamond Softball League (JD.League) was founded in 2022, and the Bee Queen became part of the new league as a member of the East Division.

== Roster ==
As of April 2022

Position	No.	Name	Age	Height	Bats	Throws	Notes
Players
Pitchers	6	(Japan) Yamato Fujita	age 35	165 cm (5 ft 5 in)	Right	Right	Competed in Olympics 2020
Pitchers	7	(Japan) Yukiko Ueno	age 43	174 cm (5 ft 9 in)	Right	Right	Player-coach; Competed in Olympics 2004, 2008 and 2020
Pitchers	15	(Japan) Yukari Hamamura	age 30	171 cm (5 ft 7 in)	Right	Right	
Pitchers	19	(Japan) Ayaka Sakurai	age 25	165 cm (5 ft 5 in)	Left	Left	
Pitchers	20	(Japan) Misaki Katsumata	age 26	171 cm (5 ft 7 in)	Right	Right	
Catchers	2	(Japan) Haruka Agatsuma	age 31	172 cm (5 ft 8 in)	Right	Right	Competed in Olympics 2020
Catchers	18	(Japan) Haruka Sumitani	age 25	165 cm (5 ft 5 in)	Right	Right	
Infielders	3	(Japan) Kanna Kudo	age 27	170 cm (5 ft 7 in)	Left	Right	
Infielders	10	(Japan) Minori Naito (c)	age 32	163 cm (5 ft 4 in)	Right	Right	Competed in Olympics 2020
Infielders	14	(Japan) Mizuki Ichimura	age 25	167 cm (5 ft 6 in)	Right	Right	
Infielders	21	(Japan) Saori Yamauchi	age 26	168 cm (5 ft 6 in)	Left	Right	
Infielders	26	(Japan) Yuka Ichiguchi	age 33	163 cm (5 ft 4 in)	Left	Right	Competed in Olympics 2020
Outfielders	1	(Japan) Miyu Kataoka	age 25	162 cm (5 ft 4 in)	Left	Right	
Outfielders	11	(Japan) Reina Matsumoto	age 27	159 cm (5 ft 3 in)	Left	Right	
Outfielders	16	(Japan) Hinako Atsumi	age 22	162 cm (5 ft 4 in)	Left	Right	
Outfielders	23	(Japan) Urara Fujimoto	age 27	149 cm (4 ft 11 in)	Left	Right	
Coaches
Senior advisor	–	(Japan) Taeko Utsugi	age 73	–	–	–	Manager of Japan in Olympics 2000 and 2004
Manager	30	(Japan) Yumi Iwabuchi	age 46	–	–	–	
Coaches	7	(Japan) Yukiko Ueno	age 43	–	–	–	Player-coach
Coaches	32	(Japan) Haruka Kurokawa	age 42	–	–	–	
