= Stacey Porter =

Australian softball player

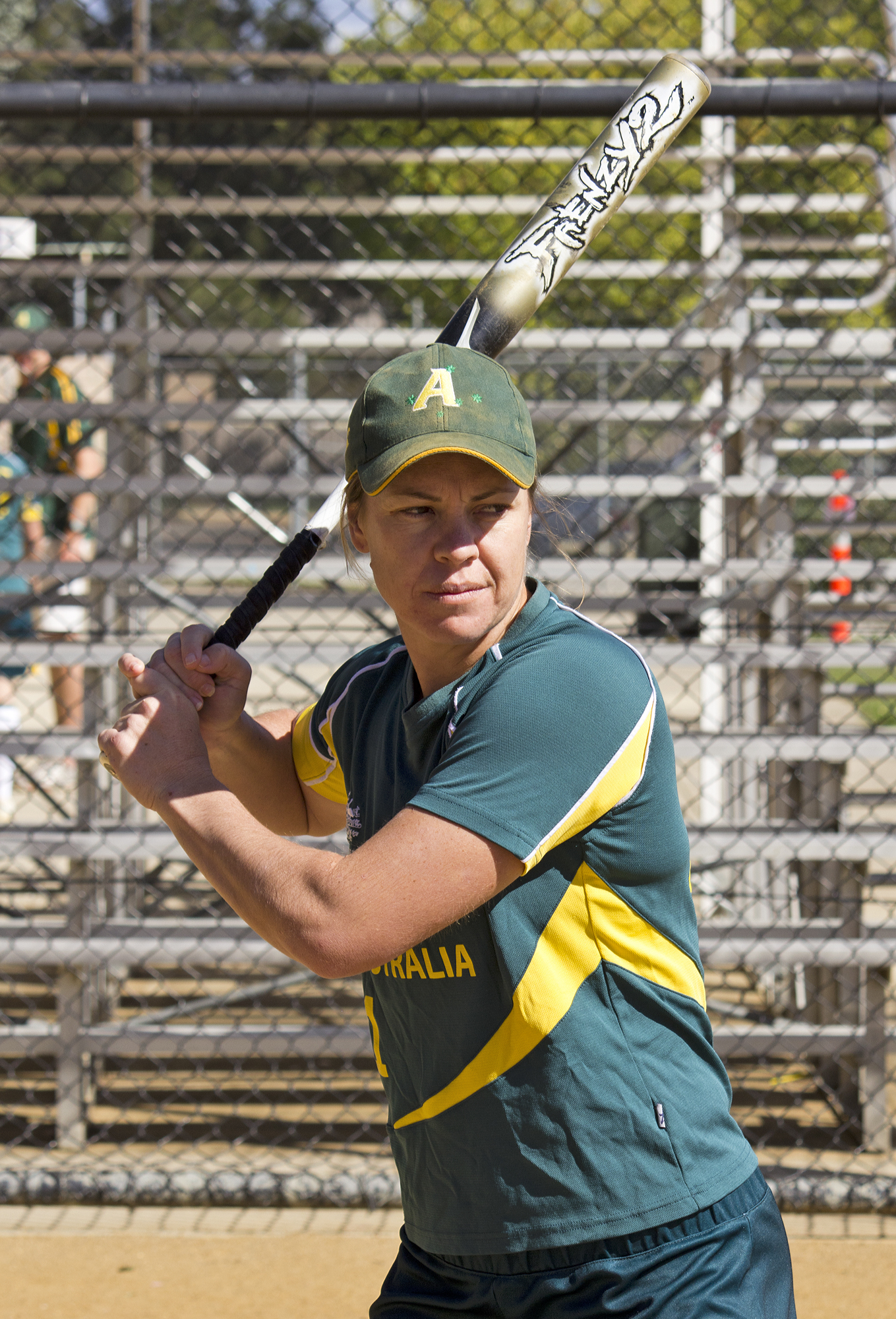
- Porter in March 2012 during a photoshoot

Personal information
- Nationality: Australian
- Born: 29 March 1982 (age 44) Tamworth, New South Wales
- Height: 183 cm (6 ft 0 in) (2004)

Sport
- Country: Australia
- Sport: Softball
- Event: Women's team
- College team: University of Hawaiʻi at Mānoa
- Club: Hills Softball Club
- Team: SGH Galaxy Stars (2008–present)
Medal record
Softball
Representing Australia
Olympics
Silver medal – second place	2004 Athens	National team
Bronze medal – third place	2008 Beijing	National team
Canada Cup
Silver medal – second place	2008 Cup	National team

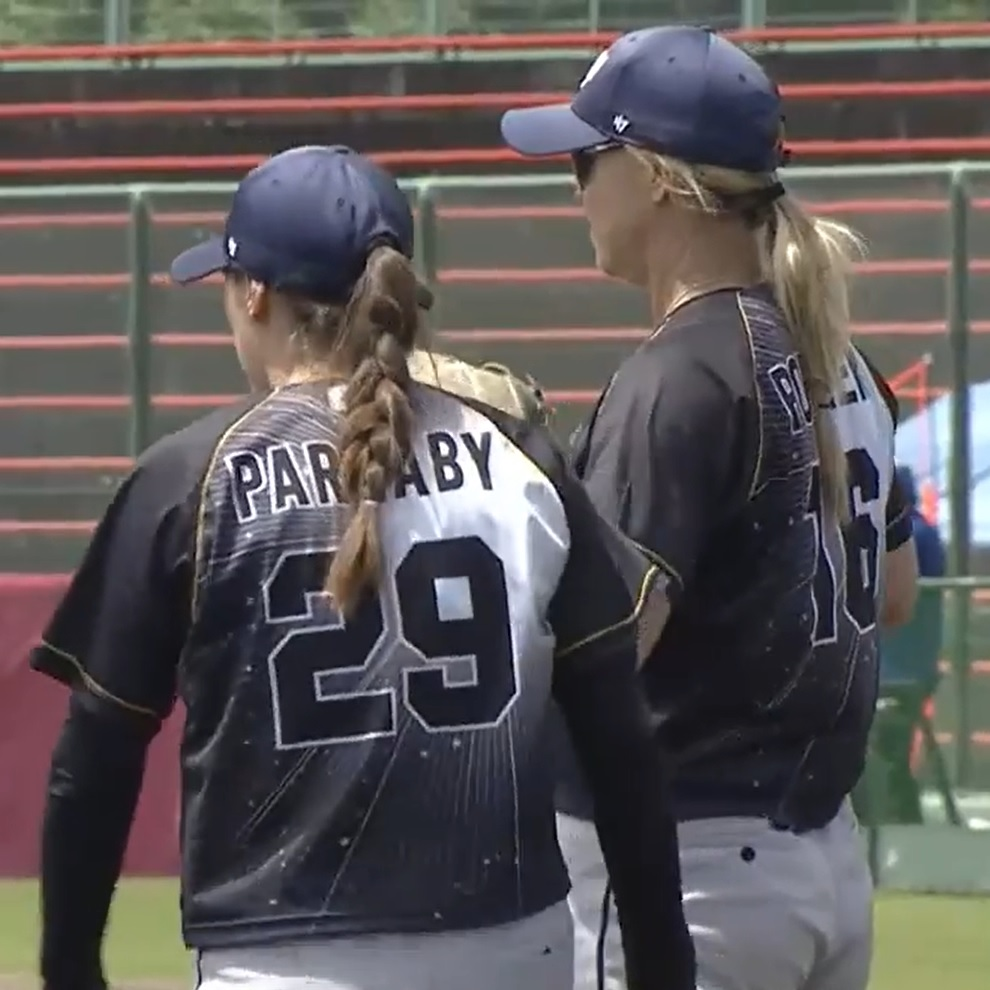
Porter and Parnaby with the Galaxy Stars in 2023

Stacey Porter (born 29 March 1982) is an Australian professional indigenous softball first/third baseman. She represents New South Wales in Australian national competitions, where she has won several national championships on the junior and senior team. She played university softball for the University of Hawaiʻi at Mānoa from 2001 to 2003 where she set several records and was named to the All-American team. She plays professional softball in Japan. She represented Australia at the junior level and continues to represent Australia at the senior level and is current Australian Captain. Stacey competed at the 2004 Summer Olympics where she won a silver medal and the 2008 Summer Olympics where she won a bronze medal and has competed in multiple world softball championships.

== Personal ==
Porter, an Indigenous Australian, was born on 29 March 1982 in Tamworth, New South Wales. She is 183 centimetres (6 ft 0 in) tall. She attended Peel High School, while playing club field hockey. She later attended the University of Hawaiʻi at Mānoa and was a freshman in 2001, and a junior in 2003. Growing up, she wanted to be a travel agent.

Porter has moved around. From 2001 to 2003, she was in Hawaii, United States, where she attended the University of Hawaiʻi at Mānoa. In 2006, she was living in Stanhope Gardens, New South Wales and in 2008, she was living in Glenwood, New South Wales. She moved to the Sydney area from Tamworth to gain access to better training facilities.

== Softball ==
Porter plays first and third base. The Eastern Reporter and Stirling Times describe her as the "woman regarded as the worlds best batter". In 2008, she played for had a scholarship with and played for the Australian Institute of Sport team. In 2012, she coached the Western Desert softball team in an exhibition match in Perth. The Desert team was created by Indigenous Sports Program, part of the Western Australian Department of Sport and Recreation (DSR) run with Softball Western Australia and Newcrest. The team she coached drew players from Parnngurr, Warralong, Jigalong, Kiwirrkurra, Nullagine and Punmu. She played Australian club softball for the Brisbane Panthers Softball Club. In 2008, she was playing professionally in the Japanese Softball League.

Porter was the first indigenous Australian to represent the country at softball in the Olympics, when she competed in the 2004 Summer Olympics. In March 2012, it was announced that she and Vanessa Stokes would be part of a programme funded by Softball Australia and the federal government to increase aboriginal involvement in the sport.

=== University team ===
Porter, playing third base, joined the University of Hawaiʻi at Mānoa team in 2001, where she started in 49 games and played in 53 total games. While there, she had six home runs, scoring the sixth in a game against Texas Tech and in the process broke the university's freshman home run record. That season, she finished second on the team the number of runs batted and total home runs. She was honoured with being the WAC Player of the Week in the fifth on 7 May 2001. She was twice named to all-tournaments teams, once for the Malihini Tourney and the second time for the Hawaiʻi Invitational.

Porter played with the university again for their 2002 season, where she started all 60 games. This season, she played first base and hit in the clean-up position. At the end of the season, her statistics included a hitting 47 RBIs with 24 coming against conference opponents, 15 home runs overall and seven against conference opponents, and having a batting average of .347 against conference opponents. In a 30 March game against San Jose State University, she set a personal career-high four hits in a single game. That season, she had a streak of having hits nine games in a row.

Porter returned for the university's 2003 season. She started every game that season. She was named to the Louisville Slugger/NFCA Division I All-America first team. At the end of the season, she broke her own school and conference record for the number of home runs in a single season having batted 17 of them and had a batting average of .479. She was also named to the Western Athletic Conference first team, named the conferences player of the year and was named to a NFCA/Louisville Slugger first-team All-American, only the eighth player from her university to earn that recognition. She sat out her senior year to spend more time with the Australian national team.

=== State team ===
Porter represents New South Wales in national competitions. In 1997, she represented the state at the U16 national championships where her team finished first. She was with the U16 team again in 1998 and 1999 at the national competition. In all three years, she was named the Batter of the Series. She then moved up to the U19 team, where at one tournament she was named the "Most Valuable Player" after having tournament stats of batting average of .607, with five doubles, five homers, and 17 runs scored.

=== Junior national team ===
Porter has represented Australia at the junior national level. In 1998, she was a member of the Australian Junior Superball Team and accompanied the team on a tour of the United States. In 1999, she represented Australia as a member of the U19 team at the Junior World Championships in Taipei.

=== Senior national team ===
Porter made her debut on the senior national team in 2002, as a twenty-year-old. She was a possible for the 2004 Summer Olympics team. In January 2004, she was named to the Australian Institute of Sport squad and given a scholarship. The team had 25 players and was the one that Olympic selectors would choose from to compete at the Games. She represented Australia at the 2004 Summer Olympics and 2008 Summer Olympics, winning a silver medal at the 2004 Games. In the gold medal match, she hit a double that allowed Sandra Allen to score. This was the only time at the 2004 Games where an opposition hitter scored a run off an American pitcher. She played in the 2008 Olympic Games march against Canada. She played in the 3–1 victory over Taiwan. In the game, she got to base after having been walked and then made it to base to score one of Australia's runs. She won a Bronze at the 2008 Games.

Porter has also won a gold medal at the World Championships. In 2008, she earned a silver medal at the Canada Cup. She represented Australia at the 2009 World Cup of Softball. In the second game against the Americans at the World Cup, she had a home run. Australia took home a silver in the competition. She competed at the 2010 World Championships in Venezuela, where she captained the Australian side. In 2011, she was a member of the Australian side that competed at the World Cup of Softball. She played in game at the Cup against the United States in which Australia lost 5–2. It was her second loss on the day, also having played in a game in which Australia lost to Japan. She is a member of the 2012 Australia women's national softball team and is trying to secure a spot on the roster so she will be able to compete at the 2012 ISF XIII Women's World Championships . She competed in a March 2012 test series against the Japan women's national softball team in Canberra.

Porter was selected for the Australian women's national softball team at the 2020 Summer Olympics. The team came away with one win out of five, beating Italy 1–0 in their second match of the Round Robin and finished fifth overall. Full details are in Australia at the 2020 Summer Olympics.

== Recognition ==
Porter has been recognised for her softball play. She has been named the Australian Softballer of the Year in 2005. That year, she was also recognised by being named Blacktown City's 2005 Sportsperson of the Year, and the 2005 Deadly Awards in the category of female sportswoman of the year. In 2008, she was the NAIDOC Sportsperson of the Year.

16 December 2023 Stacey was recognised as a life member for her home association - Tamworth Softball Association.
