= Toyota Industries Shining Vega =

Japanese women's softball team

Information
- League: JD.League (West Division)
- Location: Kariya, Aichi, Japan
- Founded: 1952; 73 years ago
- League championships: 8 (1994, 1996, 1998, 1999, 2001, 2004, 2006, 2007)
- Colors
- Ownership: Toyota Industries
- Coach: Shinichi Nagayoshi
- Website: Official website

The Toyota Industries Shining Vega (豊田自動織機シャイニングベガ, Toyota Jidō Shokki Shainingu Bega) are a Japanese women's softball team based in Kariya, Aichi. The Shining Vega compete in the Japan Diamond Softball League (JD.League) as a member of the league's West Division.

== History ==
The Shining Vega were founded in 1952, as Toyota Industries softball team.

The Japan Diamond Softball League (JD.League) was founded in 2022, and the Shining Vega became part of the new league as a member of the West Division.

== Roster ==
As of April 2022

Position	No.	Name	Age	Height	Bats	Throws	Notes
Players
Pitchers	12	(Japan) Nao Akimoto	age 30	172 cm (5 ft 8 in)	Left	Right	
Pitchers	17	(Japan) Nana Hara	age 29	171 cm (5 ft 7 in)	Right	Right	
Pitchers	19	(Japan) Yuki Eto	age 30	174 cm (5 ft 9 in)	Right	Right	
Pitchers	44	(Mexico) Dallas Escobedo	age 32	183 cm (6 ft 0 in)	Right	Right	Competed in Olympics 2020
Catchers	8	(Japan) Momoka Ikegami	age 21	165 cm (5 ft 5 in)	Left	Right	
Catchers	13	(Japan) Sakura Fukushige	age 24	163 cm (5 ft 4 in)	Left	Right	
Catchers	33	(Japan) Nana Kabayama	age 28	159 cm (5 ft 3 in)	Right	Right	
Catchers	77	(United States) Chelsea Goodacre	age 31	165 cm (5 ft 5 in)	Left	Right	
Infielders	1	(Japan) Shiho Suto	age 26	165 cm (5 ft 5 in)	Left	Right	
Infielders	4	(Japan) Remi Miyamoto	age 25	159 cm (5 ft 3 in)	Left	Right	
Infielders	5	(Japan) Akane Tai	age 30	178 cm (5 ft 10 in)	Right	Right	
Infielders	6	(Japan) Mahiro Takenaka	age 28	159 cm (5 ft 3 in)	Left	Right	
Infielders	7	(Japan) Haruna Moriyama	age 27	163 cm (5 ft 4 in)	Left	Right	
Infielders	14	(Japan) Ai Ohira	age 29	157 cm (5 ft 2 in)	Left	Right	
Infielders	26	(Japan) Honoka Konno	age 25	157 cm (5 ft 2 in)	Left	Right	
Outfielders	2	(Japan) Sui Watanabe	age 25	161 cm (5 ft 3 in)	Right	Right	
Outfielders	9	(Japan) Ayane Nakagawa	age 26	169 cm (5 ft 7 in)	Left	Right	
Outfielders	10	(Japan) Sayu Kanae (c)	age 30	168 cm (5 ft 6 in)	Left	Left	
Outfielders	11	(Japan) Yuka Sato	age 27	167 cm (5 ft 6 in)	Right	Right	
Outfielders	24	(Japan) Mahiru Kawano	age 21	162 cm (5 ft 4 in)	Left	Left	
Coaches
Manager	30	(Japan) Shinichi Nagayoshi	age 53	–	–	–	
Coaches	31	(Japan) Yasutoshi Yamasaki	age 48	–	–	–	
Coaches	32	(United States) Debbie Schneider	age 58	–	–	–	
