= Hitachi Sundiva =

Japanese women's softball team

- Logo

Information
- League: JD.League (East Division)
- Location: Yokohama, Kanagawa, Japan
- Founded: 1985; 41 years ago
- League championships: 1 (2000)
- Colors: Blue and red
- Ownership: Hitachi
- Coach: Shuji Murayama
- Website: Official website

The Hitachi Sundiva (日立サンディーバ, Hitachi Sandība) are a Japanese women's softball team based in Yokohama, Kanagawa. The Sundiva compete in the Japan Diamond Softball League (JD.League) as a member of the league's East Division.

== History ==
The Sundiva were founded in 1985 as Hitachi Software (a factory of Hitachi) softball team and joined the Japan Softball League in 1991.

The Japan Diamond Softball League (JD.League) was founded in 2022, and the Sundiva became part of the new league as a member of the East Division.

== Roster ==
As of December 2024

| Position | No. | Name | Age | Height | Bats | Throws | Notes |
Players
| Pitchers | 10 | (Japan) Mio Sakamoto (captain) | age 25 | 163 cm (5 ft 4 in) | Right | Right | |
| Pitchers | 13 | (Japan) Akari Tanai | age 28 | 160 cm (5 ft 3 in) | Left | Left | |
| Pitchers | 16 | (Japan) Masaki Sato | age 23 | 167 cm (5 ft 5 1/2 in) | Right | Right | |
| Pitchers | 17 | (Japan) Suzuka Hasegawa | age 27 | 165 cm (5 ft 5 in) | Left | Left | |
| Pitchers | 21 | (Japan) Mio Goto | age 20 | 173 cm (5 ft 8 in) | Right | Right | |
| Pitchers | 29 | (United States) Donnie Gobourne | age 25 | 175 cm (5 ft 9 in) | Right | Right | |
| Catchers | 6 | (Japan) Chihiro Mekada | age 25 | 152 cm (5 ft 0 in) | Right | Right | |
| Catchers | 25 | (United States) Dejah Mulipola | age 28 | 173 cm (5 ft 8 in) | Right | Right | Competed in Olympics 2020 |
| Catchers | 28 | (Japan) Saori Yamauchi | age 26 | 168 cm (5 ft 6 in) | Left | Right | |
| Infielders | 1 | (Japan) Kano Horiguchi | age 26 | 160 cm (5 ft 3 in) | Left | Right | |
| Infielders | 4 | (Japan) Ren Hōya | age 24 | 155 cm (5 ft 1 in) | Left | Right | |
| Infielders | 5 | (Japan) Rio Sugimoto | age 28 | 162 cm (5 ft 4 in) | Right | Right | |
| Infielders | 7 | (Japan) Yuri Kasahara | age 24 | 164 cm (5 ft 4 1/2 in) | Left | Right | |
| Infielders | 9 | (Japan) Honoka Sugiura | age 23 | 165 cm (5 ft 5 in) | Right | Right | |
| Infielders | 12 | (Japan) Miho Suzuki | age 23 | 166 cm (5 ft 5 1/2 in) | Left | Right | |
| Infielders | 15 | (Japan) Hanae Kitahara | age 20 | 159 cm (5 ft 2 1/2 in) | Left | Right | |
| Infielders | 33 | (Japan) Haruna Moriyama | age 32 | 165 cm (5 ft 5 in) | Right | Right | |
| Outfielders | 3 | (Japan) Sara Takase | age 27 | 152 cm (5 ft 0 in) | Right | Right | |
| Outfielders | 8 | (Japan) Natsumi Fujimori | age 26 | 168 cm (5 ft 6 in) | Left | Right | |
| Outfielders | 11 | (Japan) Ayana Karōji | age 25 | 165 cm (5 ft 5 in) | Right | Right | |
| Outfielders | 19 | (Japan) Aika Kagen | age 20 | 158 cm (5 ft 2 in) | Left | Right | |
| Outfielders | 20 | (Japan) Yuika Hirata | age 23 | 171 cm (5 ft 7 1/2 in) | Right | Right | |
Coaches
| Manager | 30 | (Japan) Shuji Murayama | age 43 | – | – | – | |
| Coaches | 31 | (Japan) Michiyo Ebisu | age 35 | – | – | – | |
