= Tokai Rika Cherry Blossoms =

Japanese women's softball team

Information
- League: JD.League (West Division)
- Location: Oguchi, Aichi, Japan
- Founded: 1979; 46 years ago
- Colors
- Ownership: Tokai Rika
- Coach: Akane Nakanishi
- Website: Official website

The Tokai Rika Cherry Blossoms (東海理化チェリーブロッサムズ, Tōkai Rika Cherī Burossamuzu) are a Japanese women's softball team based in Oguchi, Aichi. The Cherry Blossoms compete in the Japan Diamond Softball League (JD.League) as a member of the league's West Division.

== History ==
The Cherry Blossoms were founded in 1979, as Tokai Rika softball team.

The Japan Diamond Softball League (JD.League) was founded in 2022, and the Cherry Blossoms became part of the new league as a member of the West Division.

== Roster ==
As of April 2022

Position	No.	Name	Age	Height	Bats	Throws	Notes
Players
Pitchers	3	(Japan) Momona Kagawa	age 26	162 cm (5 ft 4 in)	Right	Right	
Pitchers	11	(Japan) Minami Hisamoto	age 25	164 cm (5 ft 5 in)	Right	Right	
Pitchers	17	(Japan) Mai Nagaya	age 28	161 cm (5 ft 3 in)	Left	Left	
Pitchers	19	(Japan) Natsuki Fujimoto	age 22	166 cm (5 ft 5 in)	Left	Left	
Pitchers	21	(Japan) Mirai Takahashi	age 23	161 cm (5 ft 3 in)	Left	Right	
Catchers	14	(Japan) Miyane Asada	age 27	170 cm (5 ft 7 in)	Left	Right	
Catchers	25	(Japan) Angel Yamamoto	age 25	155 cm (5 ft 1 in)	Left	Right	
Catchers	33	(Japan) Tamaki Motokawa	age 25	164 cm (5 ft 5 in)	Right	Right	
Infielders	1	(Japan) Nami Kamimura	age 26	160 cm (5 ft 3 in)	Left	Right	
Infielders	2	(Japan) Hikaru Shibao	age 23	156 cm (5 ft 1 in)	Left	Right	
Infielders	6	(Japan) Narumi Uchida	age 28	159 cm (5 ft 3 in)	Left	Right	
Infielders	8	(Japan) Yuka Ikeda	age 25	158 cm (5 ft 2 in)	Left	Right	
Infielders	10	(Japan) Sayaka Fumoto (c)	age 30	158 cm (5 ft 2 in)	Left	Right	
Infielders	13	(Japan) Karin Takizawa	age 24	155 cm (5 ft 1 in)	Left	Right	
Infielders	16	(Japan) Haruka Kainuma	age 27	172 cm (5 ft 8 in)	Left	Right	
Infielders	24	(Japan) Miina Ogura	age 25	157 cm (5 ft 2 in)	Right	Right	
Outfielders	4	(Japan) Shino Momose	age 31	158 cm (5 ft 2 in)	Left	Right	
Outfielders	5	(Japan) Miku Fujiki	age 27	157 cm (5 ft 2 in)	Right	Right	
Outfielders	7	(Japan) Nana Yoshida	age 27	158 cm (5 ft 2 in)	Right	Right	
Outfielders	9	(Japan) Saori Anami	age 29	169 cm (5 ft 7 in)	Left	Right	
Outfielders	12	(Japan) Yuka Nishide	age 23	153 cm (5 ft 0 in)	Left	Right	
Outfielders	15	(Japan) Ami Kato	age 27	160 cm (5 ft 3 in)	Left	Right	
Outfielders	22	(Japan) Nene Matsuba	age 25	165 cm (5 ft 5 in)	Left	Right	
Coaches
Manager	30	(Japan) Akane Nakanishi	age 45	–	–	–	
Coaches	31	(Japan) Kanako Ochi	age 39	–	–	–	
Coaches	32	(Japan) Mayuki Okuda	age 30	–	–	–	
