= Honda Reverta =

Japanese women's softball team

Information
- League: JD.League (East Division)
- Location: Mooka, Tochigi, Japan
- Founded: 2001; 24 years ago (1983 as Honda Engineering)
- Colors
- Ownership: Honda
- Coach: Mai Onishi
- Website: Official website

The Honda Reverta (ホンダリヴェルタ, Honda Riveruta) are a Japanese women's softball team based in Mooka, Tochigi. The Reverta compete in the Japan Diamond Softball League (JD.League) as a member of the league's East Division.

== History ==
The Reverta were founded in 1983, as Honda Engineering softball team. The team was transferred to Honda in 2001.

The Japan Diamond Softball League (JD.League) was founded in 2022, and the Reverta became part of the new league as a member of the East Division.

== Roster ==
As of April 2022

Position	No.	Name	Age	Height	Bats	Throws	Notes
Players
Pitchers	3	(United States) Ally Carda	age 32	177 cm (5 ft 10 in)	Right	Right	Competed in Olympics 2020
Pitchers	17	(Japan) Miki Yamaguchi	age 29	178 cm (5 ft 10 in)	Right	Right	
Pitchers	18	(Japan) Akane Akizu	age 26	178 cm (5 ft 10 in)	Right	Right	
Pitchers	24	(United States) Jailyn Ford	age 30	178 cm (5 ft 10 in)	Right	Left	
Catchers	25	(Japan) Kana Tanamachi	age 28	170 cm (5 ft 7 in)	Right	Right	
Catchers	26	(Japan) Suzuka Yasuyama	age 26	160 cm (5 ft 3 in)	Right	Right	
Infielders	1	(Japan) Komi Hishitani	age 22	157 cm (5 ft 2 in)	Left	Right	
Infielders	2	(Japan) Mana Kimura	age 22	167 cm (5 ft 6 in)	Left	Right	
Infielders	10	(Japan) Yuri Hasegawa (c)	age 31	152 cm (4 ft 12 in)	Right	Right	
Infielders	11	(Japan) Mayu Okawa	age 25	167 cm (5 ft 6 in)	Left	Right	
Infielders	14	(Japan) Mizuki Watanabe	age 26	167 cm (5 ft 6 in)	Left	Right	
Infielders	21	(Japan) Manami Matsuda	age 30	156 cm (5 ft 1 in)	Right	Right	
Outfielders	6	(Japan) Maino Kasuya	age 30	167 cm (5 ft 6 in)	Right	Right	
Outfielders	9	(Japan) Ayumi Shimomura	age 26	162 cm (5 ft 4 in)	Left	Right	
Outfielders	23	(Japan) Manami Daikuya	age 33	167 cm (5 ft 6 in)	Right	Right	
Outfielders	28	(Japan) Hotaru Tsukamoto	age 25	164 cm (5 ft 5 in)	Left	Right	
Coaches
Manager	30	(Japan) Mai Onishi	age 41	–	–	–	
Coaches	31	(Japan) Kazuhide Kato	age 35	–	–	–	
