= Takagi Kitakyushu Water Wave =

Japanese women's softball team

Information
- League: JD.League (West Division)
- Location: Kitakyushu, Fukuoka, Japan
- Founded: 2017; 8 years ago (1969 as Toshiba Kitakyushu)
- Colors
- Ownership: Takagi
- Coach: Miho Raijo
- Website: Official website

The Takagi Kitakyushu Water Wave (タカギ北九州ウォーターウェーブ, Takagi Kitakyūshū Wōtā Wēbu) are a Japanese women's softball team based in Kitakyushu, Fukuoka. The Water Wave compete in the Japan Diamond Softball League (JD.League) as a member of the league's West Division.

== History ==
The Water Wave were founded in 1969, as Toshiba Kitakyushu (a factory of Toshiba) softball team. The team was transferred to Takagi in 2017.

The Japan Diamond Softball League (JD.League) was founded in 2022, and the Water Wave became part of the new league as a member of the West Division.

== Roster ==
As of April 2022

Position	No.	Name	Age	Height	Bats	Throws	Notes
Players
Pitchers	11	(Japan) Saki Kobayashi	age 29	162 cm (5 ft 4 in)	Right	Right	
Pitchers	14	(Japan) Nanami Yoshizaki	age 28	152 cm (4 ft 12 in)	Left	Left	
Pitchers	16	(Japan) Mua Kanada	age 21	171 cm (5 ft 7 in)	Left	Right	
Pitchers	18	(Japan) Saki Uemura	age 25	161 cm (5 ft 3 in)	Right	Right	
Pitchers	27	(Japan) Ayane Shikano	age 23	167 cm (5 ft 6 in)	Left	Left	
Catchers	10	(Japan) Hinano Otozu (c)	age 27	157 cm (5 ft 2 in)	Left	Right	
Catchers	21	(Japan) Ayumi Yamaguchi	age 25	165 cm (5 ft 5 in)	Right	Right	
Infielders	3	(Japan) Yuka Yamane	age 24	155 cm (5 ft 1 in)	Left	Right	
Infielders	7	(Japan) Mayu Hosomi	age 28	154 cm (5 ft 1 in)	Left	Right	
Infielders	15	(Japan) Sayaka Doi	age 25	162 cm (5 ft 4 in)	Left	Left	
Infielders	19	(Japan) Masaki Kanehira	age 28	164 cm (5 ft 5 in)	Left	Right	
Infielders	23	(Japan) Mana Hosono	age 22	166 cm (5 ft 5 in)	Switch	Right	
Outfielders	1	(Japan) Haru Okazaki	age 25	169 cm (5 ft 7 in)	Left	Right	
Outfielders	2	(Japan) Nami Higuchi	age 31	165 cm (5 ft 5 in)	Right	Right	
Outfielders	4	(Japan) Kaho Sato	age 28	160 cm (5 ft 3 in)	Left	Left	
Outfielders	6	(Japan) Kanami Naruse	age 21	160 cm (5 ft 3 in)	Right	Right	
Outfielders	22	(Japan) Misa Fukumoto	age 28	163 cm (5 ft 4 in)	Left	Right	
Outfielders	37	(Japan) Mao Watanabe	age 28	165 cm (5 ft 5 in)	Right	Right	
Coaches
Manager	30	(Japan) Miho Raijo	age 46	–	–	–	
Coaches	–	(Japan) Yasunori Watanabe	age 51	–	–	–	
