= Chelsea Goodacre =

American softball player

USSSA Pride – No. 77
- Catcher
- Born: September 26, 1993 (age 32)

Teams
- USSSA Pride (2015–present); Toyota Industries Shining Vega (2020–2022)

Career highlights and awards
- Gold Glove Award (2017); All-NPF Team (2019)

Chelsea Kathleen Goodacre (born September 26, 1993) is an American professional softball catcher. Goodacre played college softball for the Arizona Wildcats from 2012 to 2015. She currently plays for the independent USSSA Pride and played for United States women's national softball team. She won the Rawlings Gold Glove Award in 2017. She was undrafted but later went on to play in the National Pro Fastpitch and be named an All-Star and win two championships with the Pride.

== Arizona ==
Goodacre debuted in 2012. As both a sophomore and junior, Goodacre earned All-Pac-12 Conference recognition. In her senior year alone, Goodacre was named a National Fastpitch Coaches Association Second Team All-American to go along with a final conference honors. She led the Nation in RBIs. On February 10 vs. the Northwestern Wildcats, Goodacre hit her 50th career home run. Later on March 21, in a doubleheader with the New Mexico State Aggies, she delivered 7 RBIs to pass the 200 benchmark, becoming the eighth hitter in school history to reach both clubs. Goodacre made her last appearance against the LSU Tigers on May 24 and drove in two runs and walked. She left the University of Arizona ranking top-10 in career home runs and RBIs.

== Statistics ==
Arizona Wildcats
YEAR	G	AB	R	H	BA	RBI	HR	3B	2B	TB	SLG	BB	SO	SB	SBA
2012	55	147	17	37	.251	23	8	0	5	66	.449%	13	20	0	0
2013	59	184	40	64	.348	58	17	0	8	123	.668%	16	25	1	1
2014	60	170	43	56	.329	72	22	0	11	133	.782%	26	24	0	0
2015	61	176	35	59	.335	86	24	0	8	139	.790%	30	23	0	0
TOTALS	235	677	135	216	.319	239	71	0	32	461	.681%	85	92	1	1
