= Nodoka Harada =

Japanese softball player (born 1991)

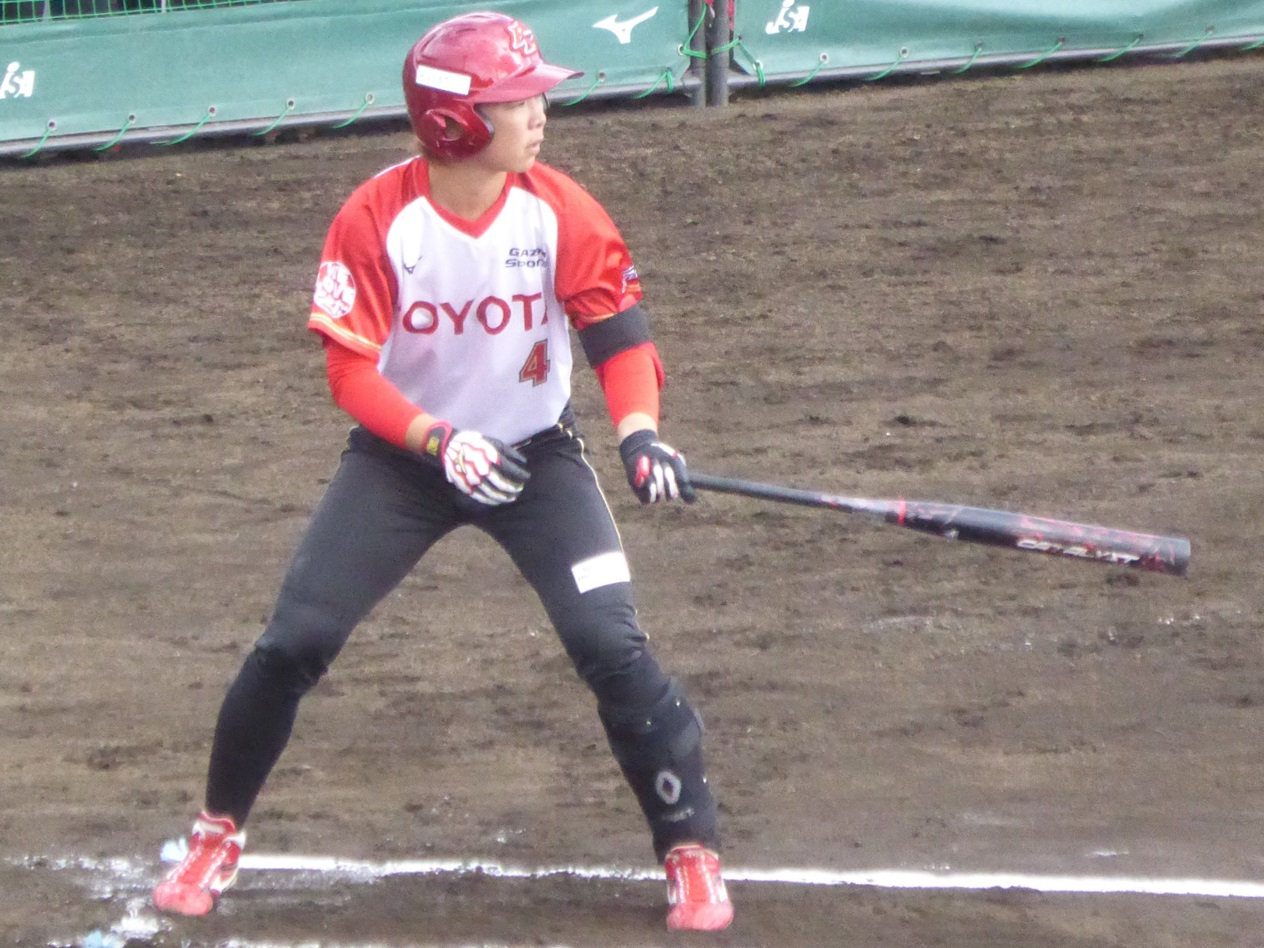
- Harada in 2023

Toyota Red Terriers – No. 4
- Outfield
- Born: 9 August 1991 (age 34); Sōja, Japan
- Bats: Right Throws: Right
Medals
Women's softball
Representing Japan
Olympic Games
Gold medal – first place	2020 Tokyo	Team
World Games
Silver medal – second place	2022 Birmingham	Team
Asian Games
Gold medal – first place	2018 Jakarta-Palembang	Team
Asian Championship
Gold medal – first place	2017 Taichung	Team
Gold medal – first place	2019 Jakarta	Team

Nodoka Harada (原田 のどか, Harada Nodoka, born 9 August 1991) is a Japanese softball player. She competed in the 2020 Summer Olympics and won a gold medal.
