= Ogaki Minamo =

Japanese women's softball team

Information
- League: JD.League (East Division)
- Location: Ōgaki, Gifu, Japan
- Founded: February 2010; 15 years ago
- Colors: Blue and red
- Manager: Hirotaka Kadomatsu
- Website: Official website

The Ogaki Minamo (大垣ミナモ, Ōgaki Minamo) are a Japanese women's softball team based in Ogaki, Gifu. The Minamo compete in the Japan Diamond Softball League (JD.League) as a member of the league's East Division.

== History ==
The Minamo were founded in February 2010 as the Ogaki Minamo Softball Club. The club recruited former Olympians, such as Mariko Masubuchi, who won the silver medal at the 2000 Summer Olympics in Sydney, Kazue Ito, who won the silver medal in Sydney 2000 and the bronze medal at the 2004 Summer Olympics and Motoko Fujimoto, who was part of the Japanese squad that won the gold medal at the 2008 Summer Olympics. The club joined the Japan Softball League in 2013.

The Japan Diamond Softball League (JD.League) was founded in 2022, and the Minamo became part of the new league as a member of the East Division.

== Roster ==
As of November 2024

Position	No.	Name	Age	Height	Bats	Throws	Notes
Players
Pitchers	15	(Japan) Maaya Sakuraba	age 23	1.60 m (5 ft 3 in)	Left	Left	
Pitchers	18	(Japan) Maria Mihori	age 20	1.59 m (5 ft 2 1/2 in)	Left	Right	
Pitchers	33	(United States) Samantha Shaw	age 28	1.83 m (6 ft 0 in)	Right	Right	
Pitchers	38	(Japan) Miryu Nakamura	age 23	1.75 m (5 ft 9 in)	Right	Right	
Pitchers	47	(Japan) Hinako Nakayama	age 26	1.60 m (5 ft 3 in)	Left	Left	
Catchers	7	(United States) Lindsay Thomas	age 31	1.70 m (5 ft 7 in)	Right	Right	
Catchers	25	(Japan) Yui Iwatsuki	age 20	1.59 m (5 ft 2 1/2 in)	Left	Right	
Infielders	1	(Japan) Nichika Suzumura	age 24	1.52 m (5 ft 0 in)	Left	Right	
Infielders	3	(Japan) Ayami Kobayashi	age 24	1.63 m (5 ft 4 in)	Left	Right	
Infielders	10	(Japan) Wakako Chikamoto (captain)	age 26	1.61 m (5 ft 3 1/2 in)	Right	Right	
Infielders	11	(Japan) Sayuri Uchida	age 26	1.68 m (5 ft 6 in)	Left	Left	
Infielders	16	(Japan) Nozomi Nishino	age 27	1.57 m (5 ft 2 in)	Left	Right	
Infielders	17	(Japan) Neneka Narita	age 23	1.54 m (5 ft 1/2 in)	Left	Right	
Infielders	23	(Japan) Hina Konishi	age 20	1.64 m (5 ft 4 1/2 in)	Left	Right	
Infielders	28	(Japan) Rira Nakano	age 19	1.55 m (5 ft 1 in)	Right	Right	
Outfielders	2	(Japan) Masaki Sunako	age 23	1.64 m (5 ft 4 1/2 in)	Left	Right	
Outfielders	4	(Japan) Miki Inoue	age 22	1.60 m (5 ft 3 in)	Left	Right	
Outfielders	5	(Japan) Maria Kobayashi	age 23	1.58 m (5 ft 2 in)	Right	Right	
Outfielders	8	(Japan) Rino Setoguchi	age 24	1.53 m (5 ft 0 in)	Left	Right	
Outfielders	9	(Japan) Suzuka Yamaguchi	age 26	1.63 m (5 ft 4 in)	Left	Right	
Outfielders	21	(Japan) Ririka Ito	age 26	1.69 m (5 ft 6 1/2 in)	Right	Right	
Coaches
Manager	30	(Japan) Hirotaka Kadomatsu	age 62	–	–	–	
Coaches	31	(Japan) Mariko Sudo	age 27	–	–	–	
