= Toda Medics =

Japanese women's softball team

Information
- League: JD.League (East Division)
- Location: Toda, Saitama, Japan
- Founded: 18 March 1976; 49 years ago
- Colors
- Ownership: Toda Medicalcare Group
- Coach: Itsushi Fukuda
- Website: Official website

The Toda Medics (戸田メディックス, Toda Medikkusu), officially the Toda Chuo Medics Saitama (戸田中央メディックス埼玉, Toda Chūō Medikkusu Saitama), are a Japanese women's softball team based in Toda, Saitama. The Medics compete in the Japan Diamond Softball League (JD.League) as a member of the league's East Division.

== History ==
The Medics were founded on 18 March 1976 as Toda Chuo Hospital softball team. In 1999, the club was promoted to the Japan Softball League.

The Japan Diamond Softball League (JD.League) was founded in 2022, and the Medics became part of the new league as a member of the East Division.

== Roster ==
As of November 2024

Position	No.	Name	Age	Height	Bats	Throws	Notes
Players
Pitchers	14	(Japan) Riko Murayama	age 23	1.68 m (5 ft 6 in)	Right	Right	
Pitchers	16	(Japan) Izumi Yukawa	age 26	1.63 m (5 ft 4 in)	Right	Right	
Pitchers	18	(United Kingdom) Georgina Corrick	age 26	1.83 m (6 ft 0 in)	Right	Right	
Pitchers	20	(Japan) Yuki Masuda	age 25	1.65 m (5 ft 5 in)	Right	Right	
Pitchers	42	(China) Chai Yinan	age 23	1.80 m (5 ft 11 in)	Right	Right	
Catchers	15	(China) Ren Ming	age 25	1.77 m (5 ft 9 1/2 in)	Left	Right	
Catchers	25	(Japan) Mika Fukasawa	age 29	1.69 m (5 ft 6 1/2 in)	Right	Right	
Catchers	27	(Japan) Moe Fukushima	age 24	1.70 m (5 ft 7 in)	Right	Right	
Infielders	2	(Japan) Ayumi Suzuki	age 32	1.58 m (5 ft 2 in)	Right	Right	
Infielders	4	(Japan) Mana Imada	age 25	1.62 m (5 ft 4 in)	Left	Right	
Infielders	6	(Japan) Anri Oka	age 25	1.61 m (5 ft 3 1/2 in)	Left	Right	
Infielders	7	(Japan) Mio Endo	age 24	1.64 m (5 ft 4 1/2 in)	Left	Right	
Infielders	8	(Japan) Yui Sakamoto	age 28	1.65 m (5 ft 5 in)	Right	Right	
Infielders	9	(Japan) Reina Miwa	age 24	1.60 m (5 ft 3 in)	Left	Right	
Infielders	11	(Japan) Ami Sato	age 24	1.68 m (5 ft 6 in)	Left	Right	
Infielders	22	(United States) Sahvanna Jaquish	age 30	1.72 m (5 ft 7 1/2 in)	Right	Right	
Infielders	24	(Japan) Miki Ikegawa	age 24	1.63 m (5 ft 4 in)	Right	Right	
Infielders	55	(Japan) Ryu Sasaki	age 19	1.62 m (5 ft 4 in)	Left	Right	
Outfielders	1	(Japan) Rino Yamakita	age 25	1.61 m (5 ft 3 1/2 in)	Left	Right	
Outfielders	3	(Japan) Nami Fujiwara	age 23	1.68 m (5 ft 6 in)	Left	Right	
Outfielders	5	(Japan) Saya Takedomi	age 25	1.57 m (5 ft 2 in)	Right	Right	
Outfielders	10	(Japan) Maino Kasuya (captain)	age 30	1.67 m (5 ft 5 1/2 in)	Right	Right	
Outfielders	12	(Japan) Yui Nakagawa	age 24	1.59 m (5 ft 2 1/2 in)	Left	Right	
Outfielders	23	(Japan) Midori Yamaguchi	age 29	1.62 m (5 ft 4 in)	Left	Right	
Coaches
Manager	30	(Japan) Itsushi Fukuda	age 68	–	–	–	
Coaches	32	(Japan) Masashi Miyashita	age 73	–	–	–	
