= Denso Bright Pegasus =

Japanese women's softball team

Information
- League: JD.League (East Division)
- Location: Anjo, Aichi, Japan
- Founded: 1960; 65 years ago
- League championships: 1 (1986)
- Colors
- Ownership: Denso
- Coach: Miwa Tanoue
- Website: Official website

The Denso Bright Pegasus (デンソーブライトペガサス, Densō Buraito Pegasasu) are a Japanese women's softball team based in Anjo, Aichi. The Bright Pegasus compete in the Japan Diamond Softball League (JD.League) as a member of the league's East Division.

== History ==
The Bright Pegasus were founded in 1960, as the Denso softball team. The Japan Diamond Softball League (JD.League) was founded in 2022, and the Bright Pegasus became part of the new league as a member of the East Division.

== Roster ==
As of April 2022

Position	No.	Name	Age	Height	Bats	Throws	Notes
Players
Pitchers	11	(Japan) Emi Fujimoto	age 25	164 cm (5 ft 5 in)	Left	Right	
Pitchers	20	(Japan) Miki Nakamura	age 28	174 cm (5 ft 9 in)	Right	Right	
Pitchers	22	(United States) Carley Hoover	age 30	188 cm (6 ft 2 in)	Right	Right	
Catchers	21	(Japan) Ami Kojima	age 25	164 cm (5 ft 5 in)	Left	Right	
Catchers	26	(Japan) Tomomi Kikuchi	age 26	167 cm (5 ft 6 in)	Right	Right	
Infielders	1	(Japan) Hitomi Kawabata	age 28	164 cm (5 ft 5 in)	Left	Right	Competed in Olympics 2020
Infielders	3	(Japan) Ako Imamura	age 24	161 cm (5 ft 3 in)	Right	Right	
Infielders	6	(Japan) Sarara Kiyose	age 21	170 cm (5 ft 7 in)	Left	Right	
Infielders	17	(Japan) Natsuko Sugama	age 35	159 cm (5 ft 3 in)	Right	Right	
Infielders	24	(Japan) Nozomi Shiraishi	age 27	152 cm (4 ft 12 in)	Right	Right	
Infielders	27	(Japan) Nana Kuroda	age 25	164 cm (5 ft 5 in)	Right	Right	
Infielders	88	(Japan) Yuzuki Sumitomo	age 21	158 cm (5 ft 2 in)	Left	Right	
Outfielders	4	(Japan) Hikari Hanaura	age 23	160 cm (5 ft 3 in)	Left	Right	
Outfielders	5	(Japan) Yuka Nakamura	age 28	155 cm (5 ft 1 in)	Left	Right	
Outfielders	7	(Japan) Eri Yamada	age 41	165 cm (5 ft 5 in)	Left	Left	Competed in Olympics 2004, 2008 and 2020
Outfielders	9	(Japan) Risa Kawamura	age 25	163 cm (5 ft 4 in)	Left	Right	
Outfielders	10	(Japan) Chinami Enomoto (c)	age 30	155 cm (5 ft 1 in)	Left	Right	
Outfielders	23	(Japan) Yui Kemmochi	age 28	162 cm (5 ft 4 in)	Left	Right	
Outfielders	25	(Japan) Yukimi Sano	age 34	168 cm (5 ft 6 in)	Right	Right	
Coaches
Manager	30	(Japan) Miwa Tanoue	age 49	–	–	–	
Coaches	31	(Japan) Natsumi Nakamori	age 36	–	–	–	
