= Japan Diamond Softball League =

Japanese women's softball league

- Current season, competition or edition: 2023 JD.League season
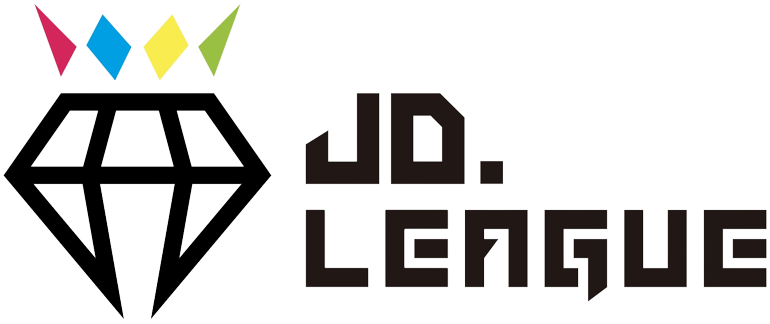
- Formerly: Japan Softball League (1968–2021)
- Sport: Softball
- First season: 2022
- No. of teams: 16
- Country: Japan
- Confederation: WBSC Asia
- Most recent champion: Toyota Red Terriers (4th title)
- Most titles: Toyota Red Terriers (4 titles)
- Website: jdleague.jp

The Japan Diamond Softball League (JD.League) is a Japanese women's softball league that consists of 16 teams (8 in the East Division and 8 in the West Division). The league is the premier women's softball league in the country. The league was formed in 2022 and is headquartered in Shinjuku, Tokyo.

The JD.League is a member of the Japan Top League Alliance, which comprises the top-tier sports leagues in Japan. Nitori entered into the title partnership with the JD.League, and thus the league is officially called Nitori JD.League.

== History ==
The first national women's softball league was founded in 1968, as the Japan Softball League. In 1994, the league's First Division expanded from 8 to 12 teams and adopted a postseason with the page playoff system. Since then, this season's format was lasted until 2021, although there were minor changes.

In 2021, the league announced a new top-tier women's softball league is planned for 2022, the Japan Diamond Softball League (JD.League). All 12 teams from the First Division and four teams from the Second Division, i.e., 16 teams in total joined in the new league. The other remaining teams in the Second/Third Division and several fresh teams formed the reborn Japan Softball League.

The opening game of the JD.League was held between Bic Camera Takasaki Bee Queen and Toyota Red Terriers on March 28, 2022. Meanwhile, the Japan Softball League still exists as a de facto lower-tier league.

Until now, the league is an industrial league, where most of the teams are owned by major companies and many players are their companies' employees. A player who is signing a professional contract is only a small portion.

== Teams ==
The JD.League consists of 16 teams divided into two divisions with 8 teams each.

| Division | Team | City | Founded | Joined | Ref |
|---|---|---|---|---|---|
| East | Honda Reverta | Mooka, Tochigi | 2001 (Note: Founded in 1983 as Honda Engineering softball team.) | 2022 | |
| East | Bic Camera Takasaki Bee Queen | Takasaki, Gunma | 2015 (Note: Founded in 1981 as Hitachi Takasaki softball team.) | 2022 | |
| East | Taiyo Yuden Solfille | Takasaki, Gunma | 1984 | 2022 | |
| East | Toda Medics | Toda, Saitama | 1976 | 2022 | |
| East | Hitachi Sundiva | Yokohama, Kanagawa | 1985 | 2022 | |
| East | Ogaki Minamo | Ogaki, Gifu | 2010 | 2022 | |
| East | NEC Platforms Red Falcons | Kakegawa, Shizuoka | 1983 | 2022 | |
| East | Denso Bright Pegasus | Anjo, Aichi | 1960 | 2022 | |
| West | Toyota Red Terriers | Toyota, Aichi | 1948 | 2022 | |
| West | Toyota Industries Shining Vega | Kariya, Aichi | 1952 | 2022 | |
| West | Tokai Rika Cherry Blossoms | Oguchi, Aichi | 1979 | 2022 | |
| West | NSK Brave Bearies | Konan, Shiga | 1972 | 2022 | |
| West | SGH Galaxy Stars | Kyoto, Kyoto | 2005 (Note: Founded in 1986 as Miki House softball team.) | 2022 | |
| West | Shionogi Rainbow Stokes Hyogo | Amagasaki, Hyogo | 1949 | 2022 | |
| West | Iyo Bank Vertz | Matsuyama, Ehime | 1985 | 2022 | |
| West | Takagi Kitakyushu Water Wave | Kitakyushu, Fukuoka | 2017 (Note: Founded in 1969 as Toshiba Kitakyushu softball team.) | 2022 | |

== Format ==
The JD.League's regular season runs from late March to late October, with each team playing 29 games. The league's postseason tournament extends into mid-November. The league has a fixed membership like NPB and most sports leagues in the United States, which makes it that does not use a promotion and relegation process.

=== Regular season ===
The JD.League consists of two divisions, the East Division and the West Division, which each has 8 teams. Each team plays 21-game Division Series against the seven other teams in its division, i.e., one home series, one away series and one neutral-site series. Furthermore, each team plays 8-game Inter-division Series against each team in the other division. Following the conclusion of the 29-game regular season, seven teams (the top three teams in each division and one wild card team) advance to a postseason tournament that determine the Grand Champion.

=== Postseason ===
Following the conclusion of the regular season, seven teams compete in the four-round postseason tournament (the two-round Playoffs and the two-round Diamond Series) with a single-elimination stepladder format.

Each division winner directly advances to the Diamond Series. The second-place and third-place teams in each division, and the wild card team (either fourth-place team in each division with better winning percentages) advance to the Playoffs, that culminates in the Diamond Series.

The Diamond Series is contested among the four teams (two division winners and two Playoffs winners) to determine the Grand Champion. The winner of the Diamond Series is referred to as the Grand Champion of JD.League.

Playoffs; Wild card game
Game 1
East Division 3rd
West Division 4th (Note: This is the wild card team. In case a qualified wild card team comes from the East Division, then the team will compete with the West Division 3rd-place team.)

Playoffs; Second round
Game 2
East Division 2nd
Game 1 winner
Game 3
West Division 2nd
West Division 3rd

Diamond Series; Semi-finals
Game 4
East Division 1st
Game 2 winner
Game 5
West Division 1st
Game 3 winner

Diamond Series; Final
Game 6
Game 4 winner
Game 5 winner

== Champions ==
=== Japan Softball League (1968–2021) ===
Until being formed the JD.League, the Japan Softball League was the top-tier league in the country from 1968 to 2021. The Bic Camera Takasaki Bee Queen won the most championships with 14 titles.

From 2022 onwards, although the Japan Softball League is still acting, no longer it is the top-tier league.

| Team | Champions | Runners-up | Seasons won | Seasons runner-up |
|---|---|---|---|---|
| Bic Camera Takasaki Bee Queen | 14 | 7 | 1990, 1995, 1997, 2002, 2003, 2005, 2008, 2009, 2013, 2015, 2017, 2019, 2020, 2021 | 1998, 2000, 2001, 2011, 2012, 2014, 2018 |
| Toyota Red Terriers | 10 | 4 | 1969-A, 1970, 1974, 1984, 2010, 2011, 2012, 2014, 2016, 2018 | 2009, 2013, 2015, 2021 |
| Toyota Industries Shining Vega | 8 | 3 | 1994, 1996, 1998, 1999, 2001, 2004, 2006, 2007 | 1997, 2005, 2008 |
| Kurabo | 8 | 0 | 1968-S, 1969-S, 1971-A, 1976, 1979, 1980, 1981, 1982 | – |
| Taiyo Yuden Solfille | 6 | 4 | 1987, 1988, 1989, 1991, 1992, 1993 | 1995, 1996, 2016, 2017 |
| Takashimaya | 3 | 0 | 1971-S, 1972, 1983 | – |
| Unitika | 2 | 0 | 1977, 1978 | – |
| Hitachi Sundiva | 1 | 5 | 2000 | 1994, 1999, 2003, 2006, 2010 |
| Denso Bright Pegasus | 1 | 0 | 1986 | – |
| NSK Brave Bearies | 1 | 0 | 1985 | – |
| Shionogi Rainbow Stokes Hyogo | 1 | 0 | 1975 | – |
| Daiwabo | 1 | 0 | 1973 | – |
| Hirobo | 1 | 0 | 1968-A | – |
| Honda Reverta | 0 | 2 | – | 2019, 2020 |
| Citrine Ichinomiya | 0 | 2 | – | 2004, 2007 |
| SGH Galaxy Stars | 0 | 1 | – | 2002 |

- JD.League teams
- Defunct teams
- Runners-up are recorded only after 1994, when the postseason playoff introduction.
- In 1968, 1969 and 1971 seasons, the spring (S) and autumn (A) tournament were held.

=== JD.League (2022–present) ===
| Team | Champions | Runners-up | Seasons won | Seasons runner-up |
|---|---|---|---|---|
| Toyota Red Terriers | 4 | 0 | 2023, 2024, 2025, 2026 | – |
| Bic Camera Takasaki Bee Queen | 1 | 2 | 2022 | 2023, 2025 |
| Hitachi Sundiva | 0 | 1 | – | 2024 |
| Toda Medics | 0 | 1 | – | 2026 |
| Toyota Industries Shining Vega | 0 | 1 | – | 2022 |

== See also ==
- Japan women's national softball team
