= Gojō River =

River in Aichi Prefecture, Japan

Gojō River 五条川
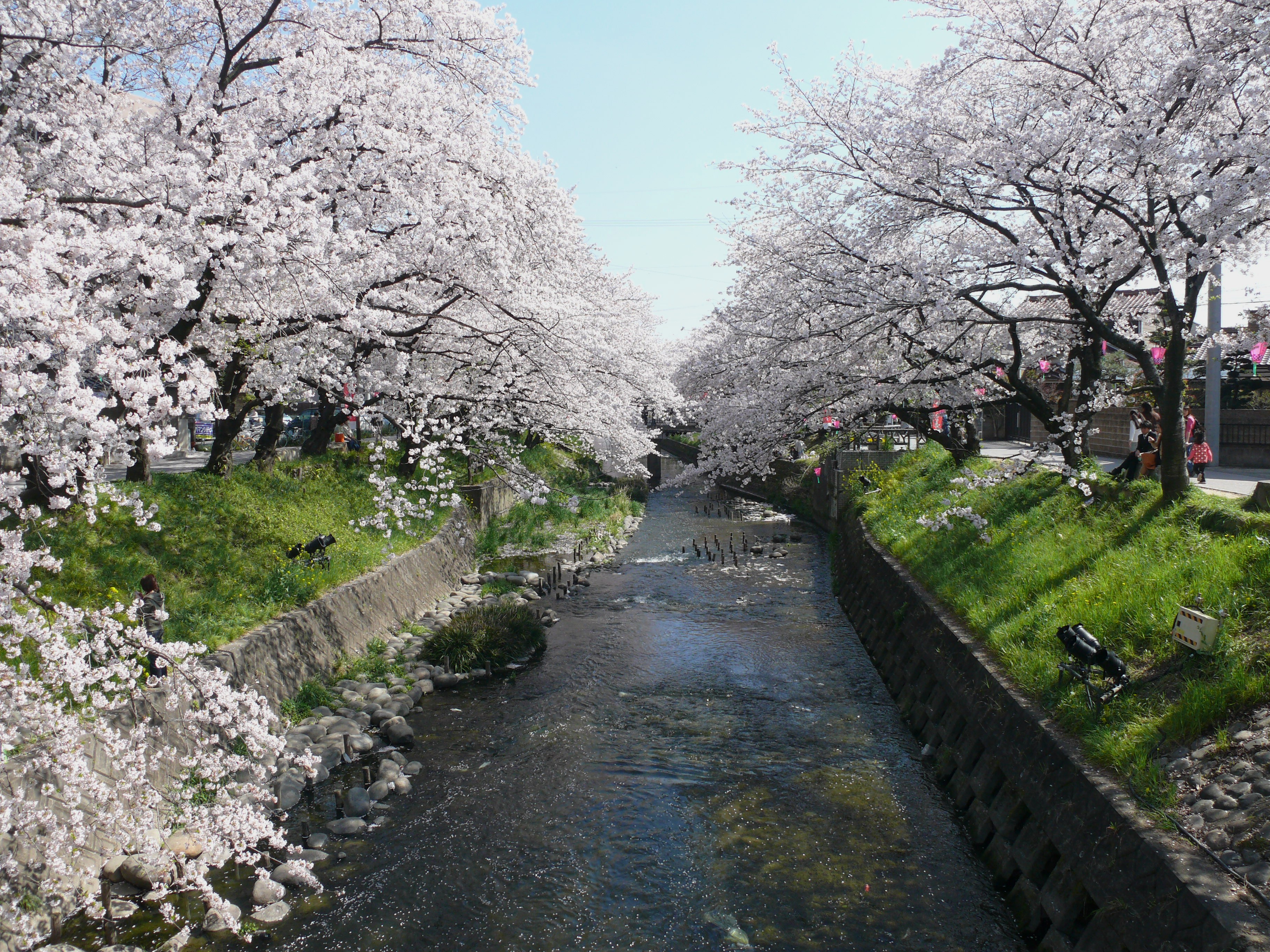
- Gojō River in Iwakura

Location
- Country: Japan

Physical characteristics
- Source
  - location: Tajimi, Gifu
  - elevation: 417 m (1,368 ft)
- Mouth
  - location: Shin River
- Length: 28.2 km (17.5 mi)
- Basin size: 114.8 km^{2} (44.3 sq mi)

Basin features
- River system: Shōnai River

The Gojō River (五条川, Gojō-gawa) flows through Gifu and Aichi prefectures in Japan. It empties into the Shin River, which is part of the Shōnai River system.

== Geography ==
The sakura on the banks of the river in Ōguchi, Konan, and Iwakura are Japan's Top 100 sakura list.

== River communities ==
Gifu Prefecture
Tajimi
Aichi Prefecture
Inuyama, Ōguchi, Konan, Ichinomiya, Iwakura, Komaki, Kitanagoya, Ichinomiya, Inazawa, Kiyosu, Ama
