= Shin River =

Shin River may refer to the following rivers:

== Japan ==
- Shin River (Aichi)
- Shin River (Chiba)

== New Zealand ==
- Shin River (New Zealand)
