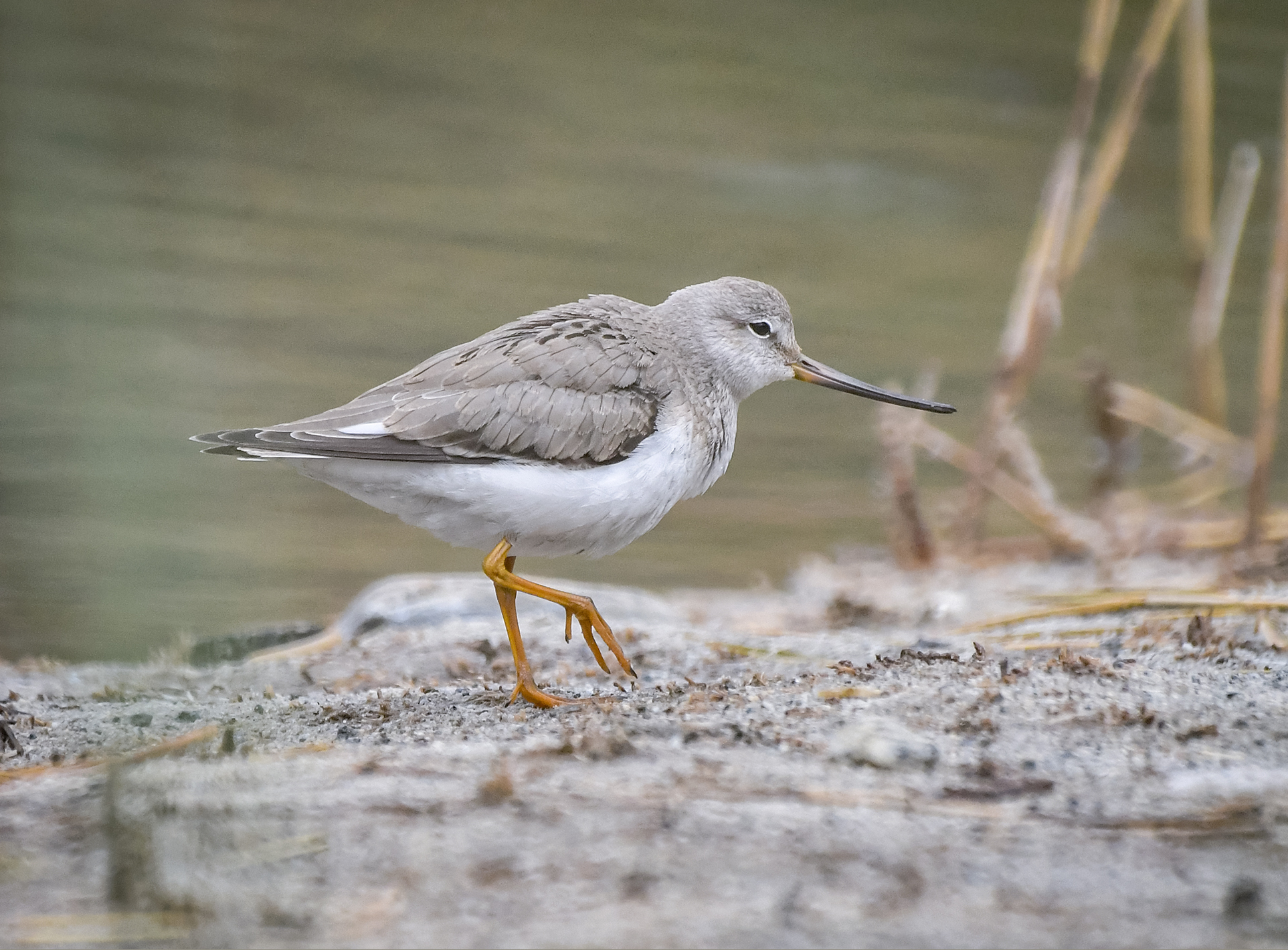

Conservation status
- Least Concern (IUCN 3.1)

Scientific classification
- Kingdom: Animalia
- Phylum: Chordata
- Class: Aves
- Order: Charadriiformes
- Family: Scolopacidae
- Genus: Xenus; Kaup, 1829
- Species: X. cinereus

Binomial name
- Xenus cinereus (Güldenstädt, 1775)
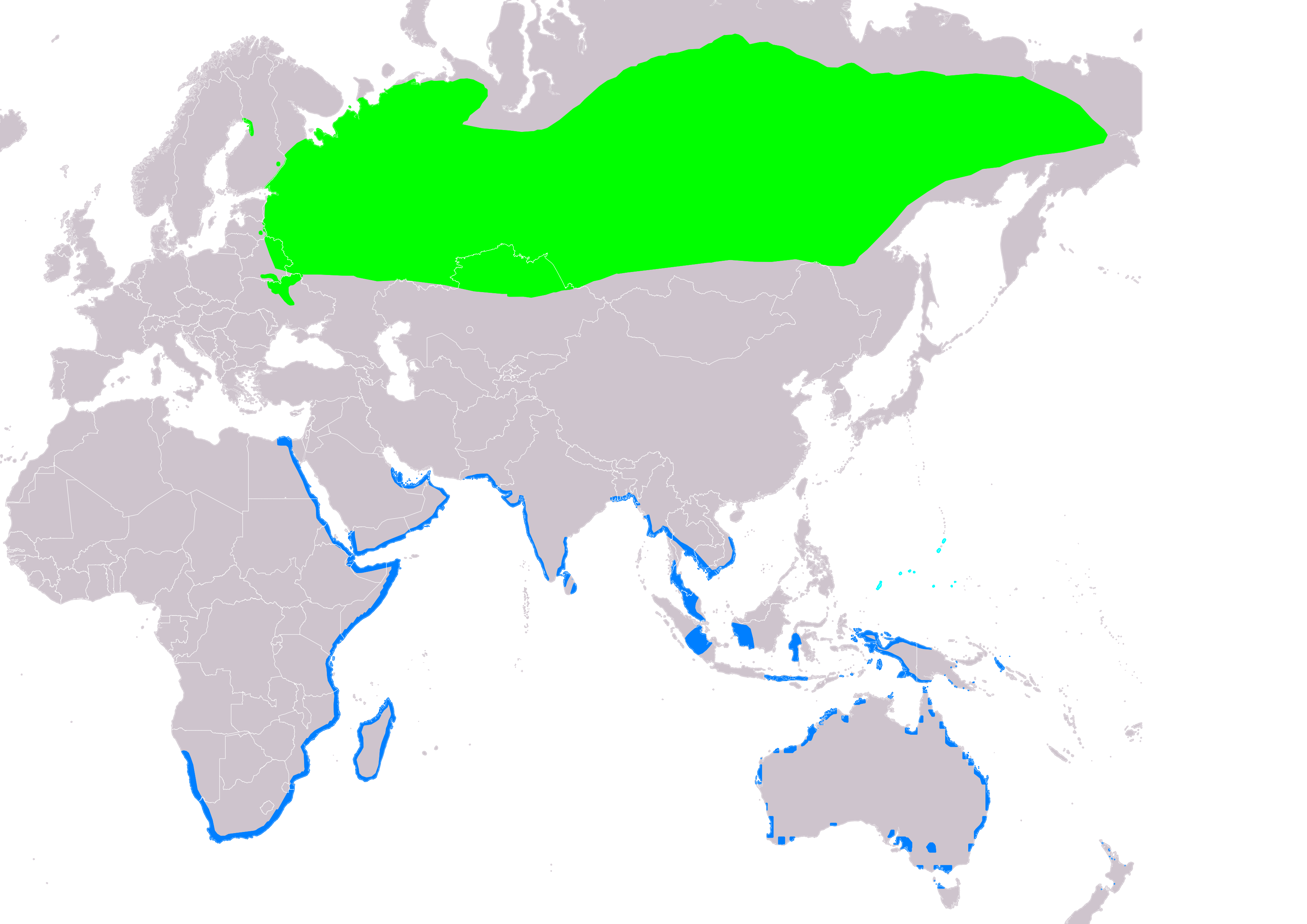
- Range of X. cinereus (Compiled by: BirdLife International and Handbook of the Birds of the World (2019) 2019) Breeding Passage Non-breeding

Synonyms
- Tringa cinerea Tringa terek

= Terek sandpiper =

Species of bird

The Terek sandpiper (Xenus cinereus) is a small migratory Palearctic wader species and is the only member of the genus Xenus. It is named after the Terek River which flows into the west of the Caspian Sea, as it was first observed around this area.

== Taxonomy ==
The Terek sandpiper was formally described and illustrated in 1775 by the German naturalist Johann Anton Güldenstädt under the binomial name Scolopax cinerea. He reported that he had seen pairs breeding at the mouth of the Terek River where it flows into the Caspian Sea. It is now the only species placed in the genus Xenus that was introduced in 1829 by the German naturalist Johann Jakob Kaup. The genus name Xenus is from Ancient Greek xenos meaning "stranger"; the specific epithet cinereus is Latin for "ash-grey" from cinis, cineris, "ashes". The species is considered to be monotypic, no subspecies are recognised.

Among the Scolopacidae, Xenus is part of the shank-tattler-phalarope clade and less closely related to the calidrid sandpipers. Based on the degree of DNA sequence divergence and putative shank and phalarope fossils from around the Oligocene/Miocene boundary some 23–22 million years ago, the Terek sandpiper presumably diverged from their relatives in the Late Oligocene. Given the numerous basal fossils of the group found in Eurasia it is likely that the Terek sandpiper lineage originated there, possibly by being isolated as the remains of the Turgai Sea dried up, which happened just around this time.

== Description ==
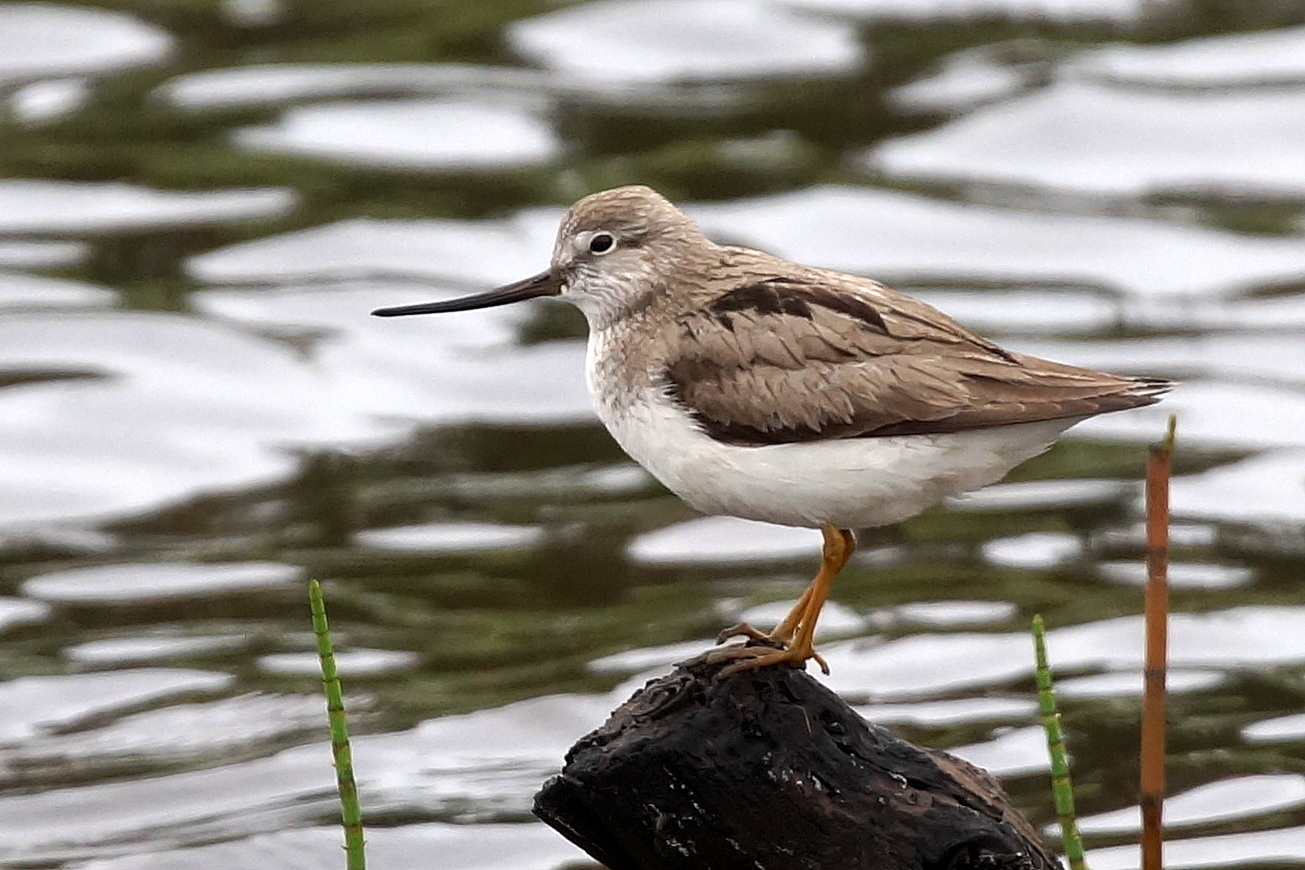

Slightly larger than the common sandpiper at 22–25 cm (8.7–9.8 in) length, its long upcurved bill – somewhat reminiscent of an avocet's, but not as strongly curved – makes it very distinctive. As the scientific specific name implies, this wader has a grey back, face and breast in all plumages; a white supercilium may appear more or less distinct. The belly is whitish and the feet yellow; the bill has a yellowish base, with the rest being black.

The call is a high whistle.

== Distribution and ecology ==
This bird breeds near water in the taiga from Finland through northern Siberia to the Kolyma River, and migrate south in winter to tropical coasts in east Africa, south Asia and Australia, usually preferring muddy areas. It is a rare vagrant in western Europe, and particularly in autumn it is sometimes seen passing through the Marianas on migration; on Palau, further off its usual migration route, it is decidedly uncommon on the other hand. Almost annually and apparently more and more often in recent times, a few birds stray to Alaska and the Aleutian and Pribilof Islands. Every few years, individual vagrants are recorded in the Neotropics, where they arrive either as migrating birds from Africa, or as North American strays accompanying local waders south for winter. Such vagrants have been recorded as far south as Argentina.

The overall genetic variation in Terek sandpipers across their range is low, with some evidence of contractions followed by expansion. Although the geographically isolated Dnieper River population in Eastern Europe does show significant genetic differentiation.

It feeds in a distinctive and very active way, chasing insects and other mobile prey, and sometimes then running to the water's edge to wash its catch.

It lays three or four eggs in a lined ground scrape.

The Terek sandpiper likes to associate with ruddy turnstones (Arenaria interpres), smallish calidrids, and Charadrius (but maybe not Pluvialis) plovers; a vagrant bird at Paraty (Rio de Janeiro state) was noted to pair up with a spotted sandpiper (Actitis macularius).

This is one of the species to which the Agreement on the Conservation of African-Eurasian Migratory Waterbirds (AEWA) applies. Widespread and often quite commonly seen, the Terek sandpiper is not considered a threatened species by the IUCN.

== Gallery ==
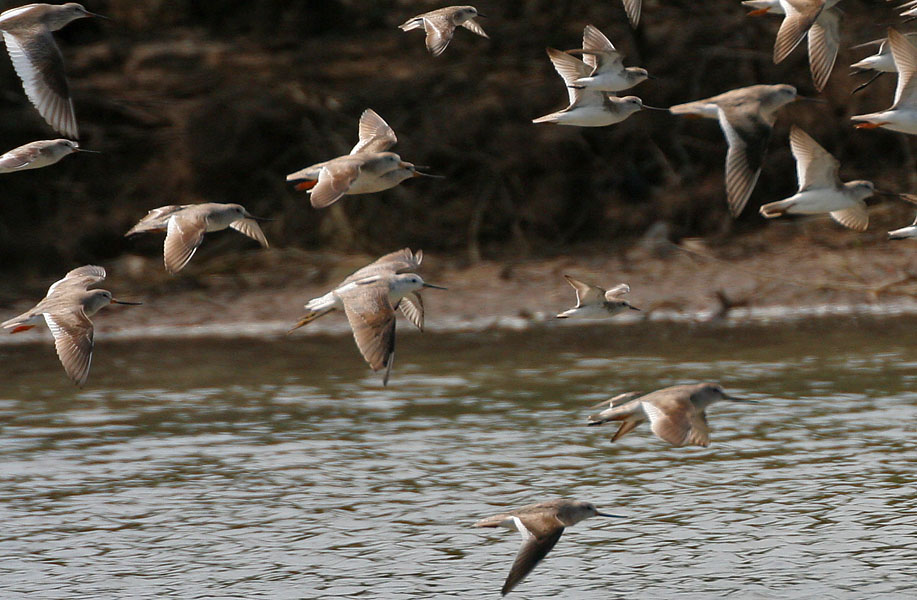
Terek sandpiper Xenus cinereus, little stint Calidris minuta and marsh sandpiper Tringa stagnatilis in Krishna Wildlife Sanctuary, Andhra Pradesh, India.

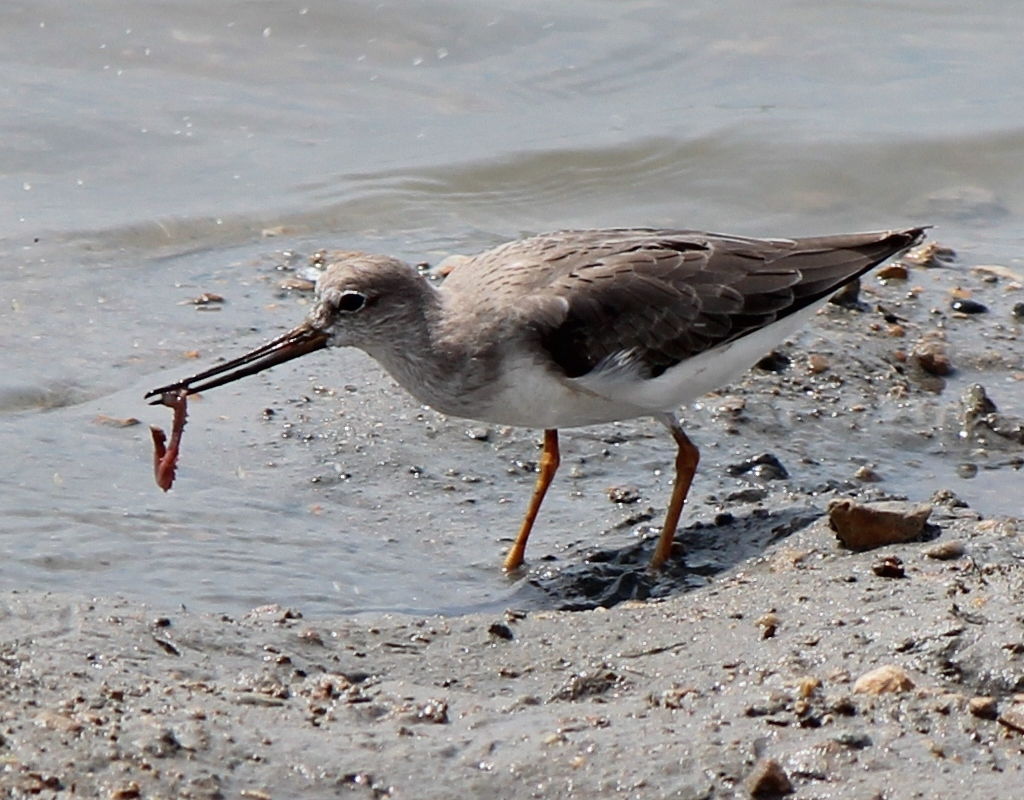
Eating ragworm in Shōnai River, Japan.

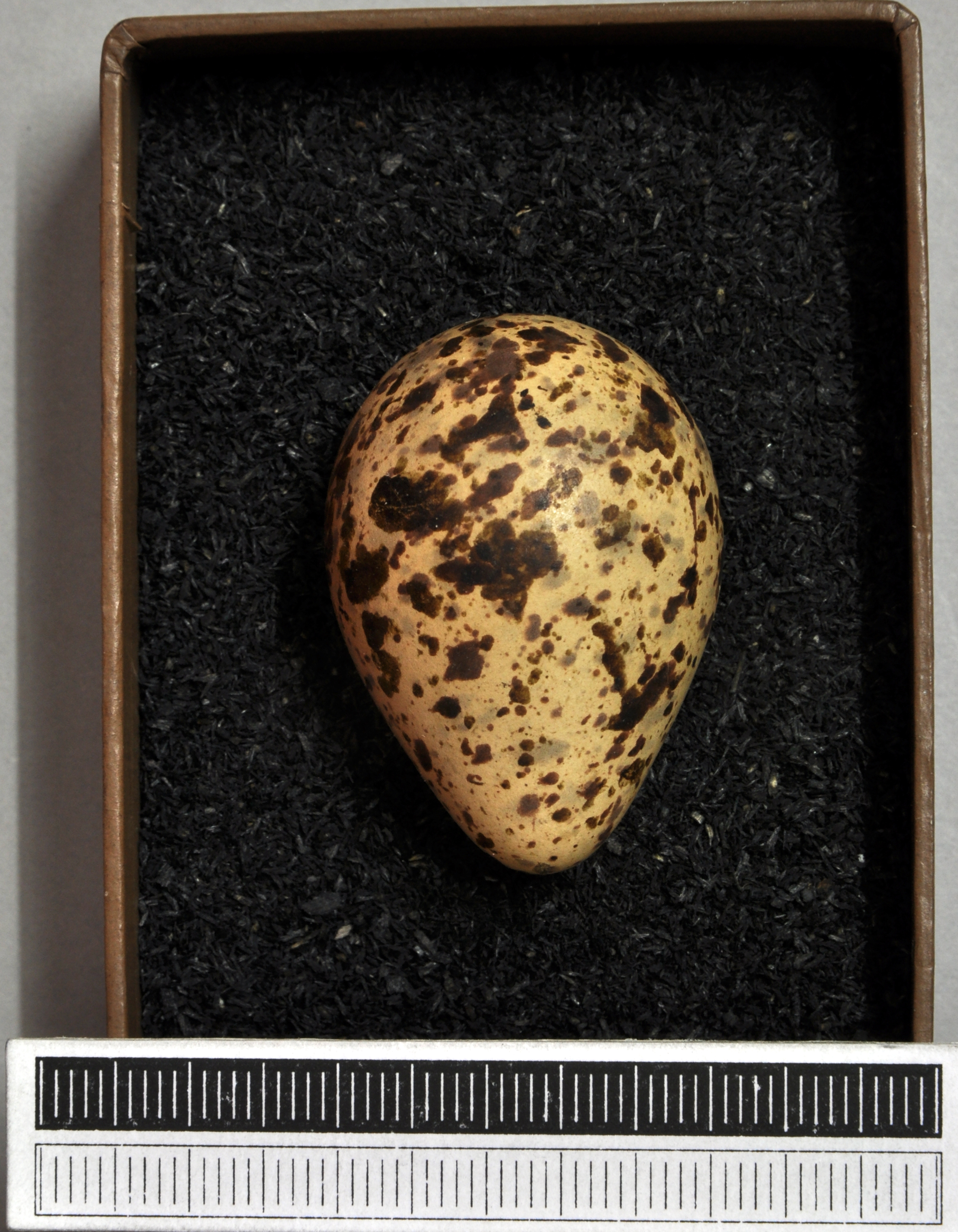
Egg, Collection Museum Wiesbaden

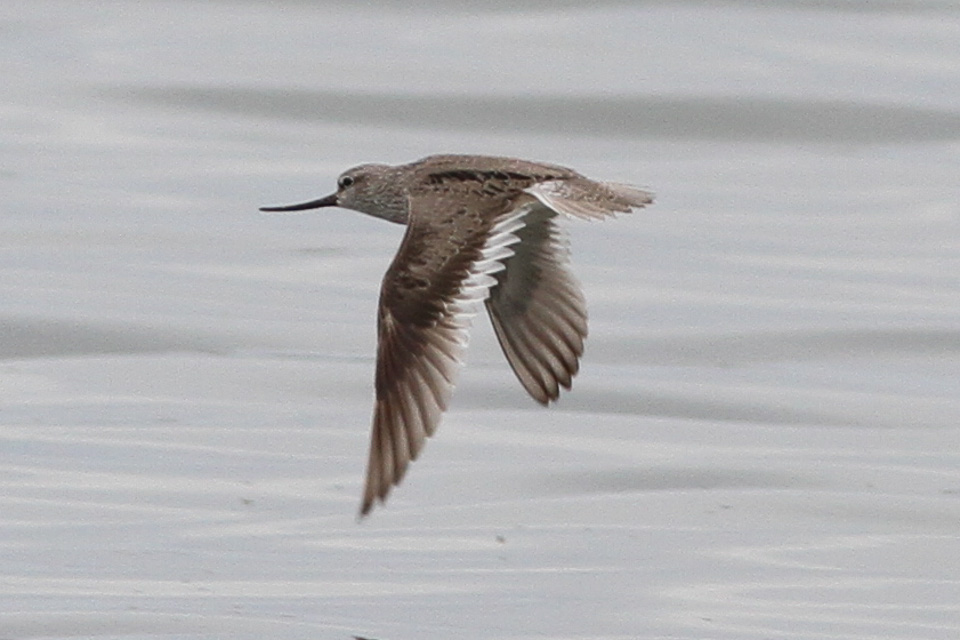
In flight

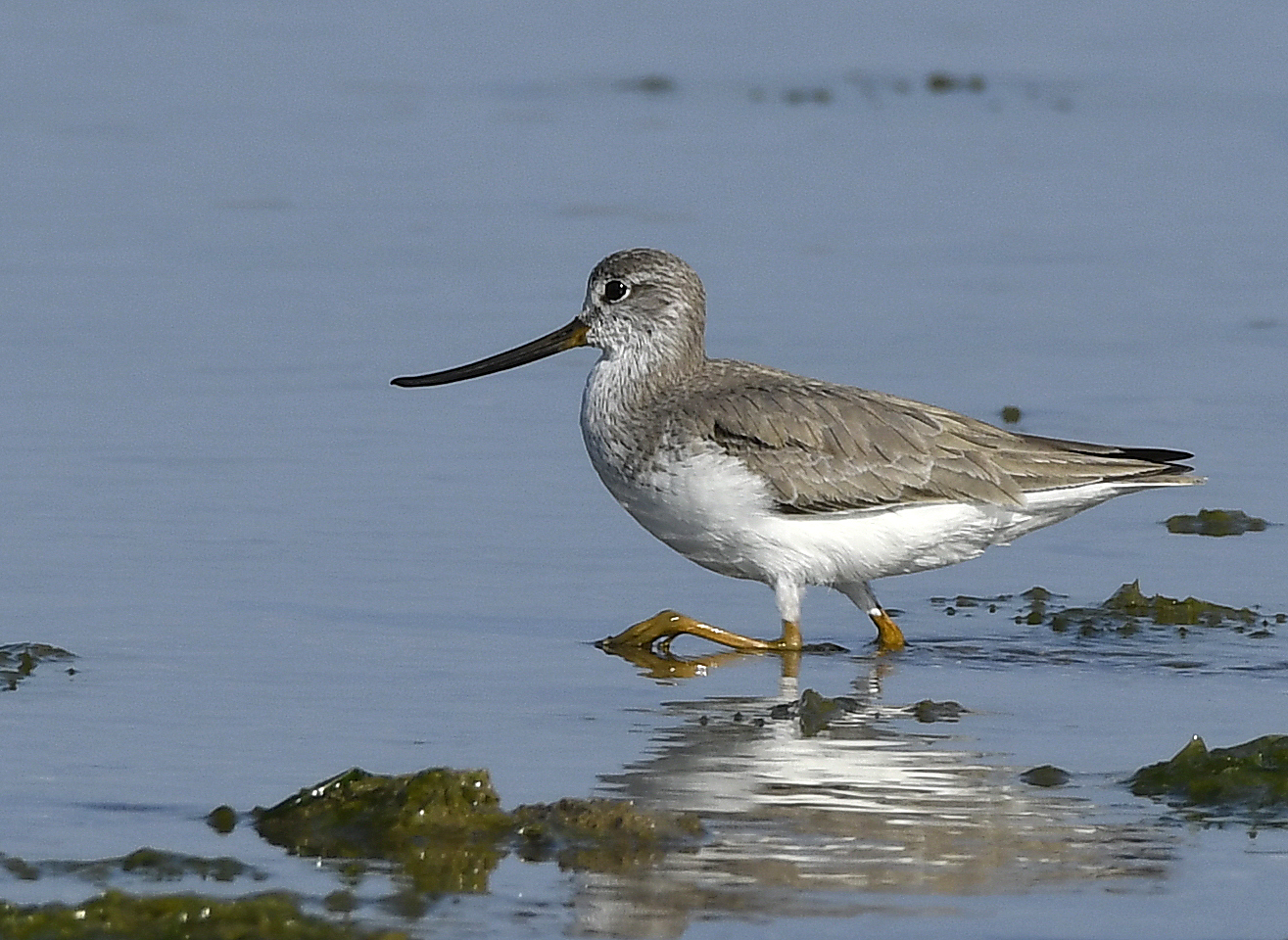
In Narara, Jamnagar, India

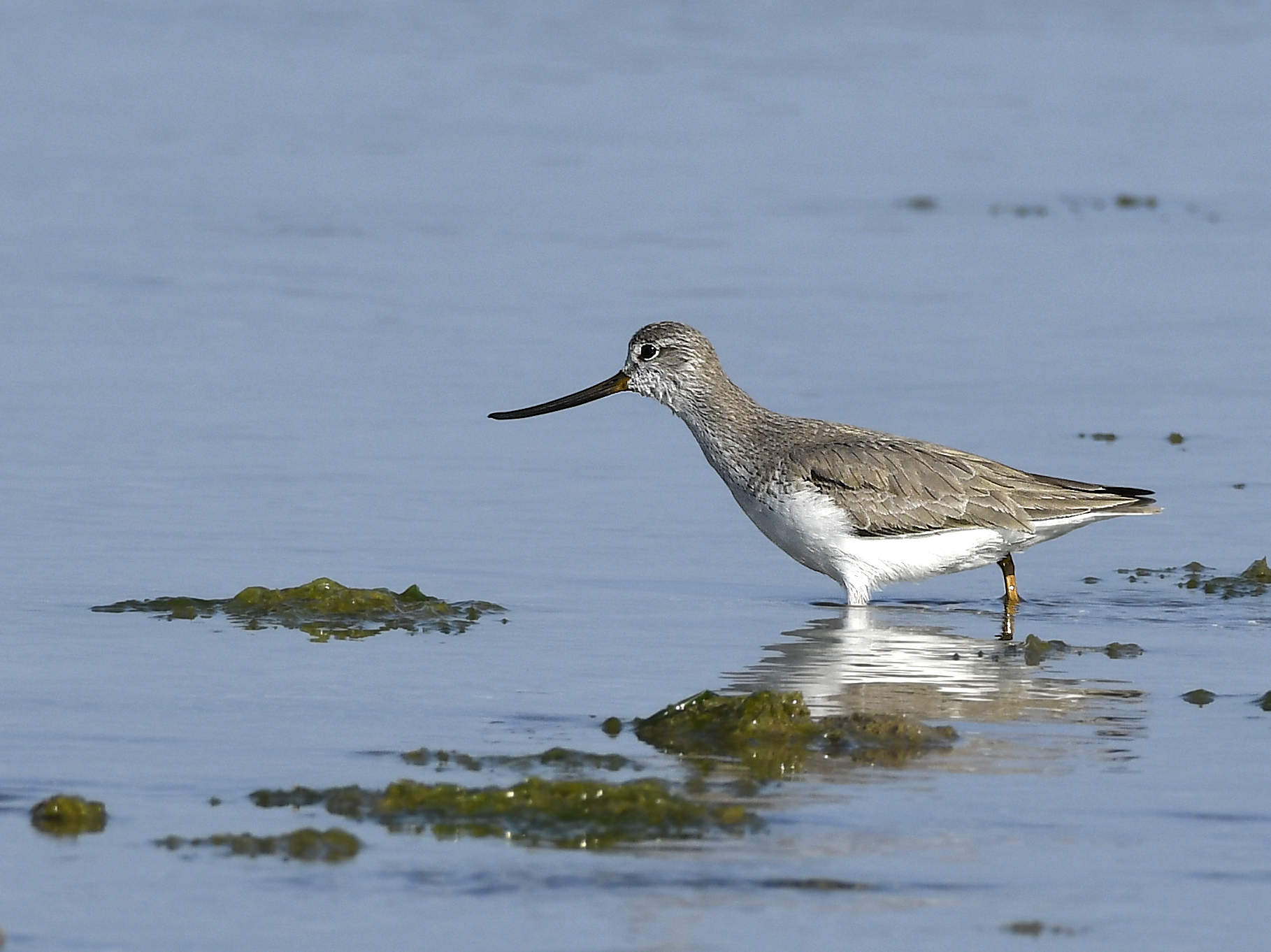
In Narara, Jamnagar, India

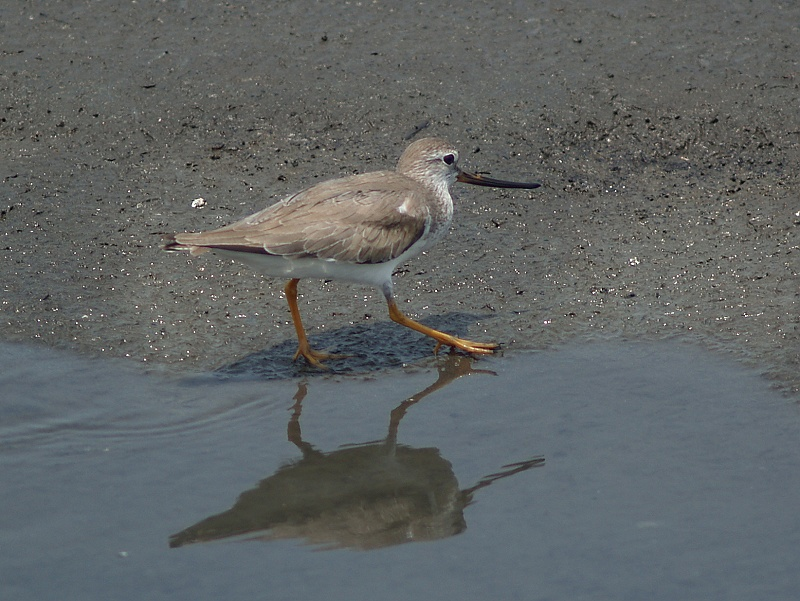
In Yunlin County, Taiwan.
