= Fujimae-higata =

Tidal flat in Aichi Prefecture, Japan

- 藤前干潟
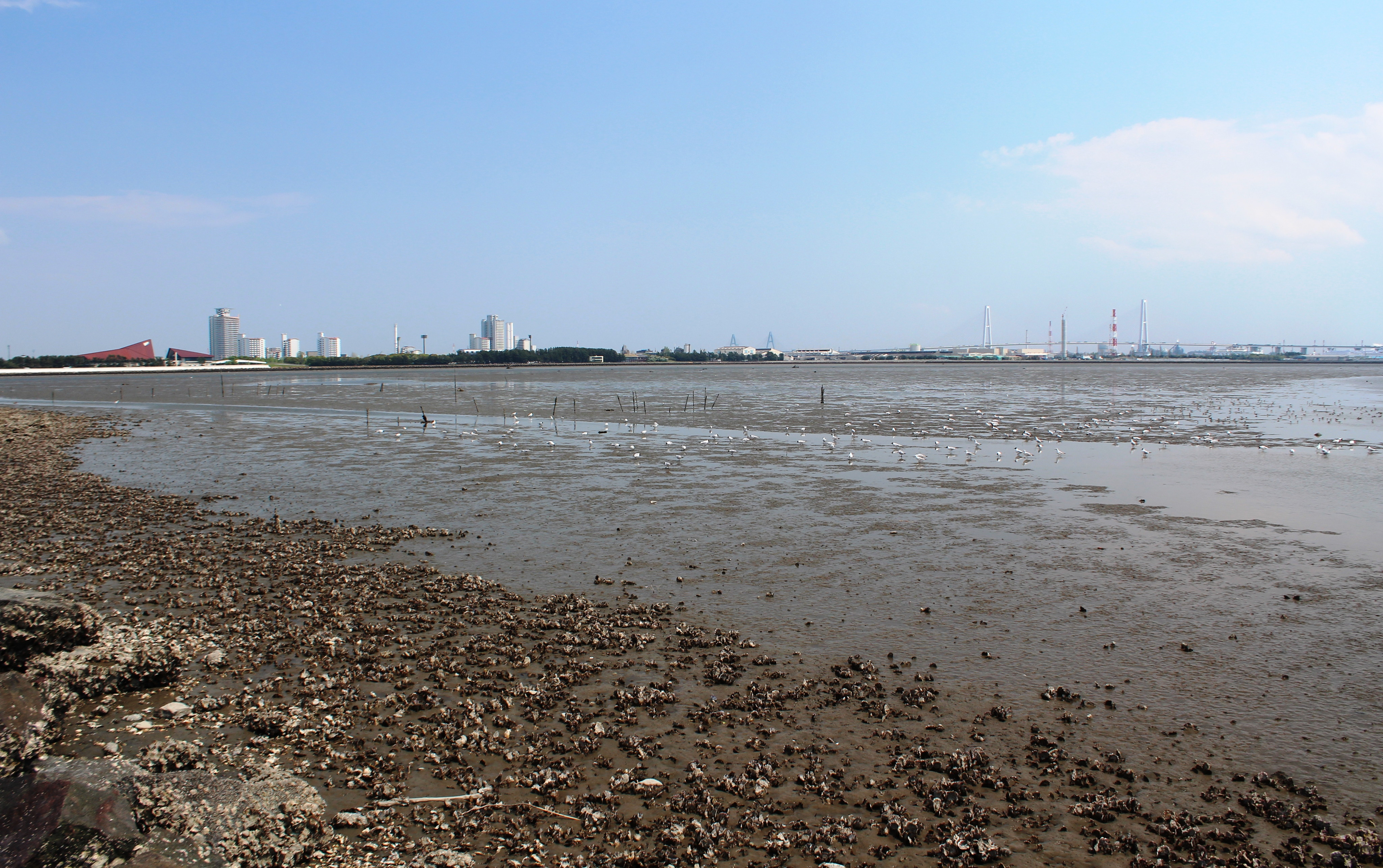
- Fujimae-higata at the mouths of Shinkawa, and Nikkō River

- Location within Japan
- Location: Nagoya, Japan
- Coordinates: 35°04′N 136°50′E
- Area: 323 ha (800 acres)
Designations
Ramsar Wetland
- Official name: Fujimae-Higata
- Designated: 18 November 2002
- Reference no.: 1200

Fujimae-higata (藤前干潟) is a tidal flat beside the Port of Nagoya in Aichi Prefecture, Japan. A campaign to stop further development has made Fujimae a symbol of the wetland conservation movement in Japan. Once celebrated in the Man'yōshū, the remaining 323 ha (800 acres) of wetlands have been designated a Ramsar Site.

== Wetlands ==
The tidal flat is at the mouths of the Shōnai, Shinkawa, and Nikkō Rivers by the Port of Nagoya. Land reclamation projects started during the Edo period and continued until the 1980s. A plan announced in 1981 to use the Fujimae tidal flat as a waste disposal site was finally abandoned after a long campaign in 1999. Due to greater awareness of their function, there are now moves to return reclaimed flats to their original state.

== Birds ==
The great cormorant, eastern spot-billed duck, and osprey are common throughout the year. The flat is also visited by a number of migratory birds, including the Eurasian curlew, bar-tailed godwit, dunlin, grey plover, northern pintail, little tern, and greater scaup. Some 172 bird species have been observed in the area in recent years. Eleven thousand shorebirds and a total of thirty-one thousand waterbirds were recorded in March 2000.

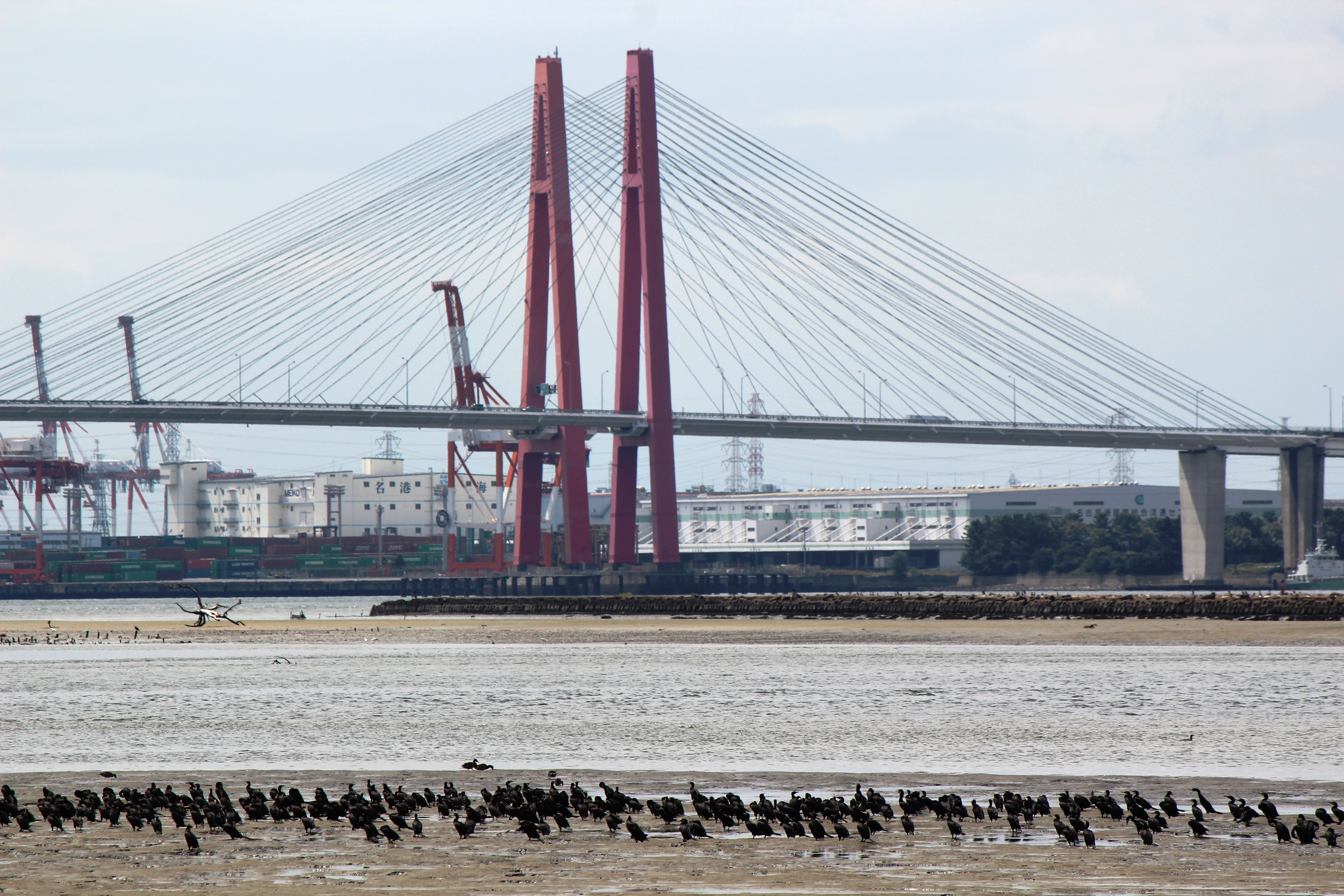
Flocks of great cormorant

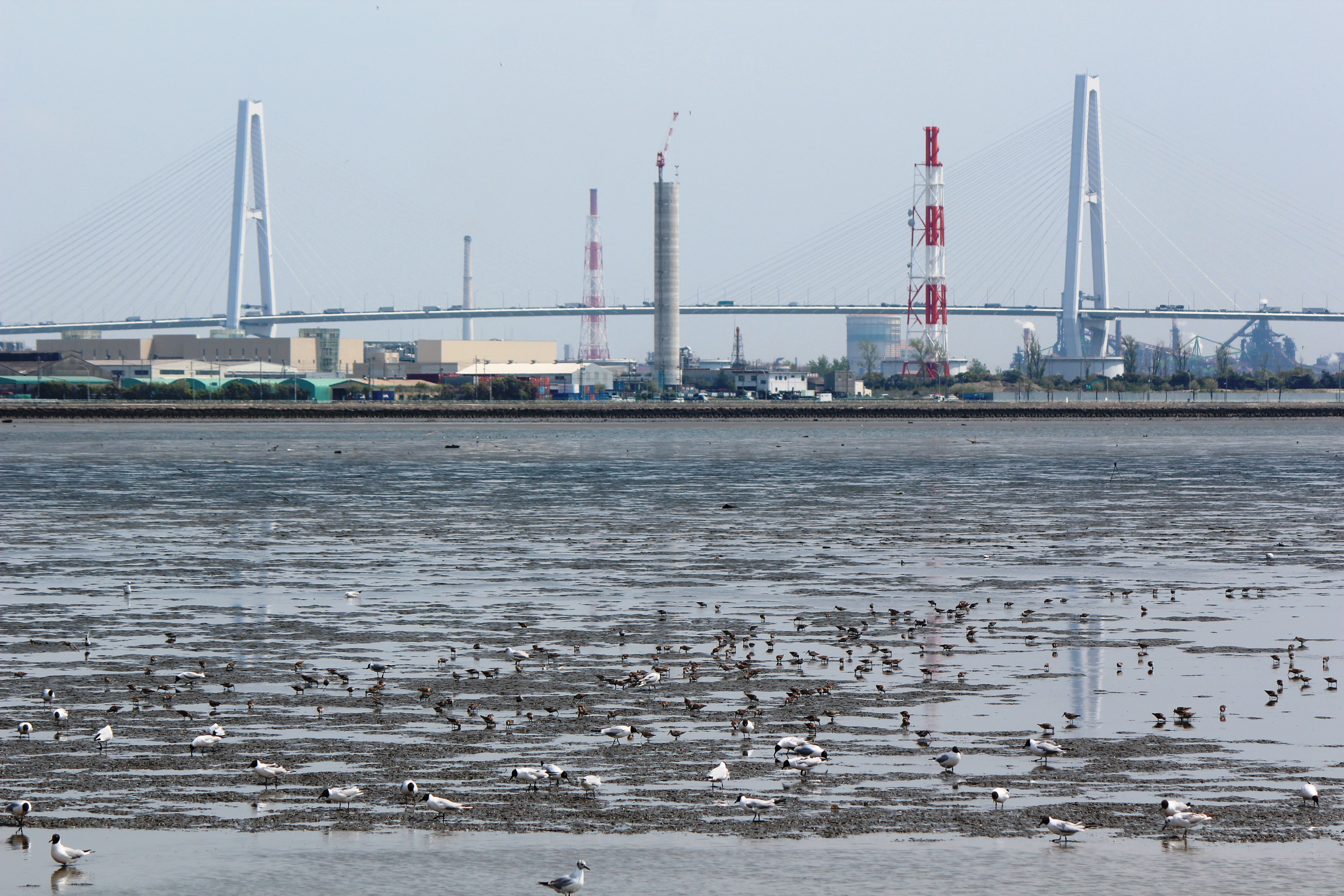
Flocks of black-headed gull and dunlin

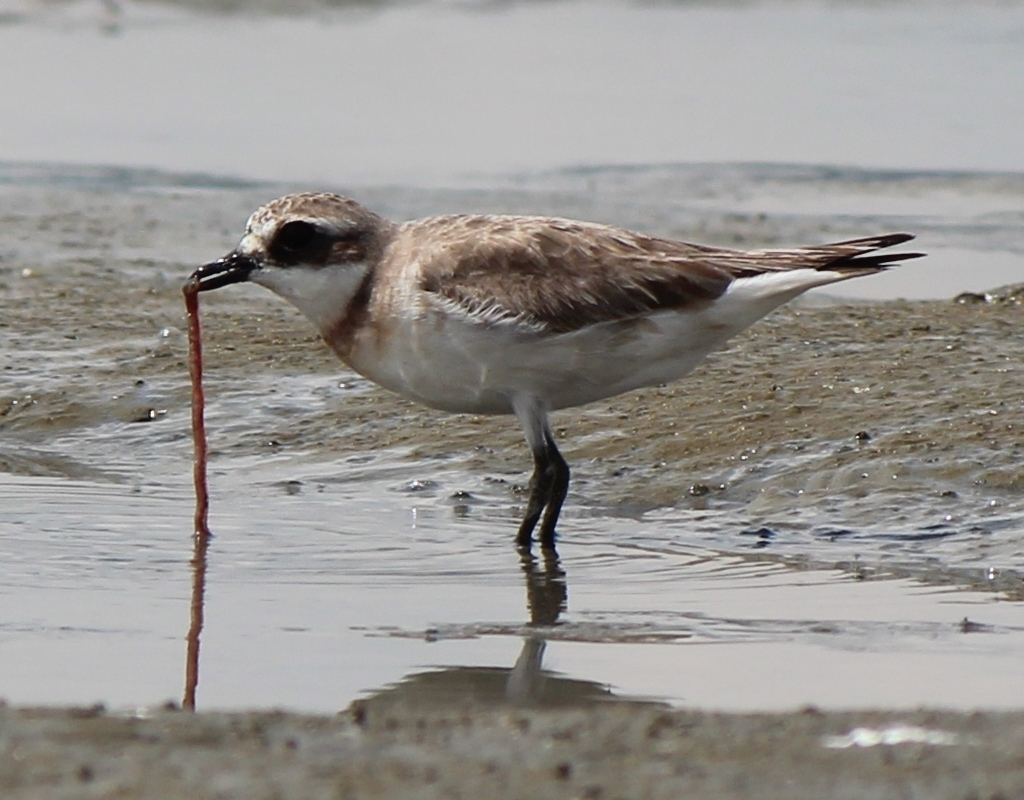
Lesser sand plover eating ragworm

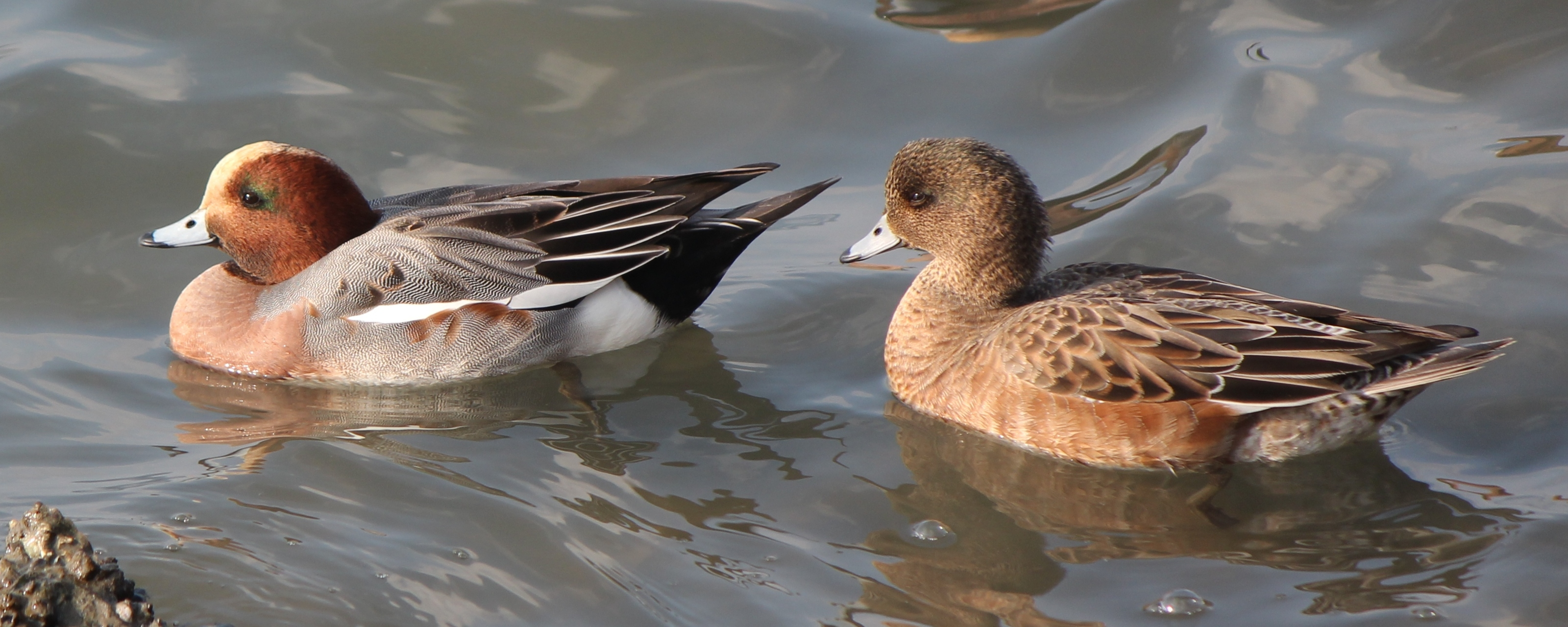
A pair of Eurasian wigeons

== Man'yōshū ==
In the third volume of the Man'yōshū there is a poem by Takechi Kurohito: "The cry of the crane, calling to Sakurada; it sounds like the tide, draining from Ayuchi flats, hearing the crane cry". Ayuchi is the original form of Aichi, and the Fujimae tidal flat is all that remains of the earlier Ayuchi-gata.

== See also ==
- Ramsar Sites in Japan
