= Okuma Corporation =

Japanese machine tool builder

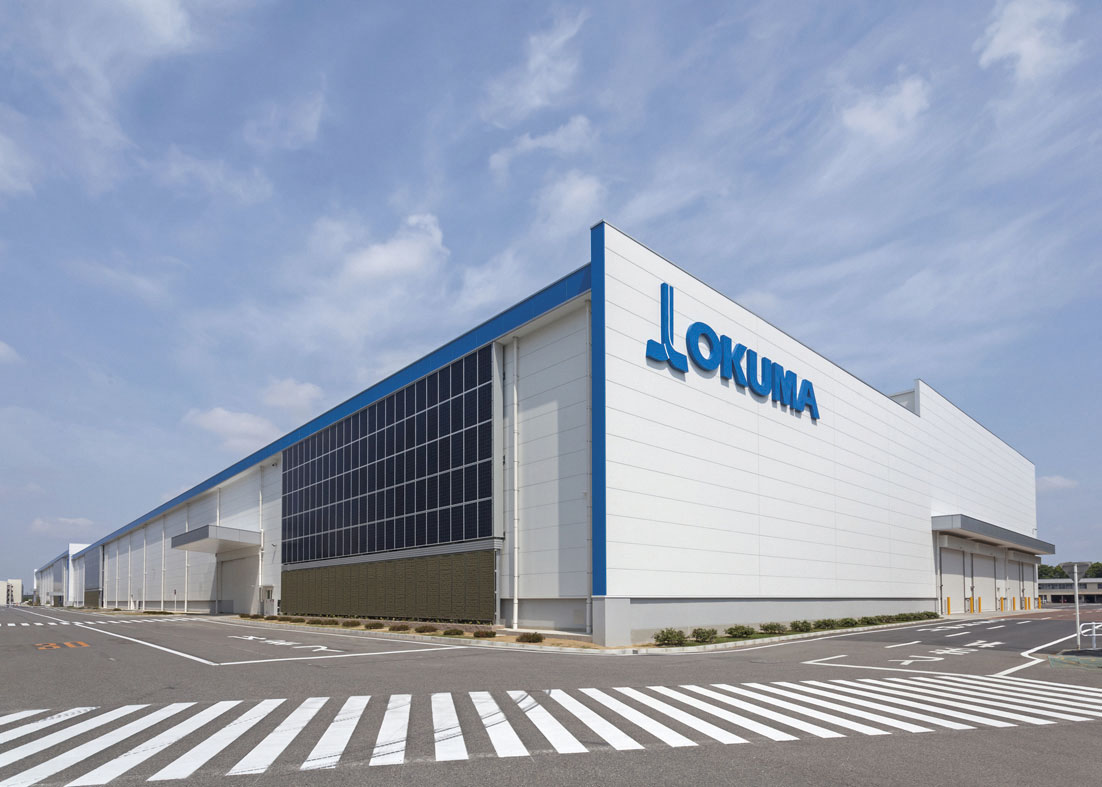
- Native name: オークマ株式会社
- Company type: Public (K.K)
- Traded as: TYO: 6103
- Industry: Machinery
- Founded: Nagoya (January 1898; 128 years ago)
- Founder: Eiichi Okuma
- Headquarters: Ōguchi, Aichi 480–0193, Japan
- Area served: Worldwide
- Key people: Atsushi Ieki (president)
- Products: Lathes; Machining centers; Multitasking machines; Grinders; CNC controls; Factory automation products
- Revenue: ▲US$ 1.305 billion (FY 2013) (JPY 134.35 billion) (FY 2013)
- Net income: ▲US$ 77.22 million (FY 2013) (JPY 7.94 billion) (FY 2013)
- Number of employees: 3,812 (consolidated, as of March 2020)
- Website: Official website

Okuma Corporation (オークマ株式会社, Ōkuma Kabushiki-gaisha) is a machine tool builder based in Ōguchi, Aichi Prefecture, Japan. It has global market share in CNC machine tools such as CNC lathes, machining centers, and turn-mill machining centers. The company also offers FA (factory automation) products and servomotors.

It is listed on the Tokyo Stock Exchange and is a component of the Nikkei 225 stock index.

== History ==
The company was founded in 1898, as the Okuma Noodle Machine Co., to manufacture and sell noodle-making machines. Eiichi Okuma, the founder of the original company, was working on how to make udon more effectively. He was using a lathe to make "sticks", that have an important role in cutting the udon noodle. But the lathes used in those days in Japan were of low precision. This was one of the big reasons which convinced Okuma to start making machine tools. In 1918 Eiichi established Okuma Machinery Works Ltd. and started selling the OS lathe.

Okuma is a machine tool builder with a history of more than 100 years. Lathes were the main product category in the early days of company. The line now includes many CNC machine tools, including lathes, machining centers (mills), multitasking (turn-mill) machines, and grinding machines. Okuma's Double-Column Machining Center has a large market share in Japan.

== Technological development ==
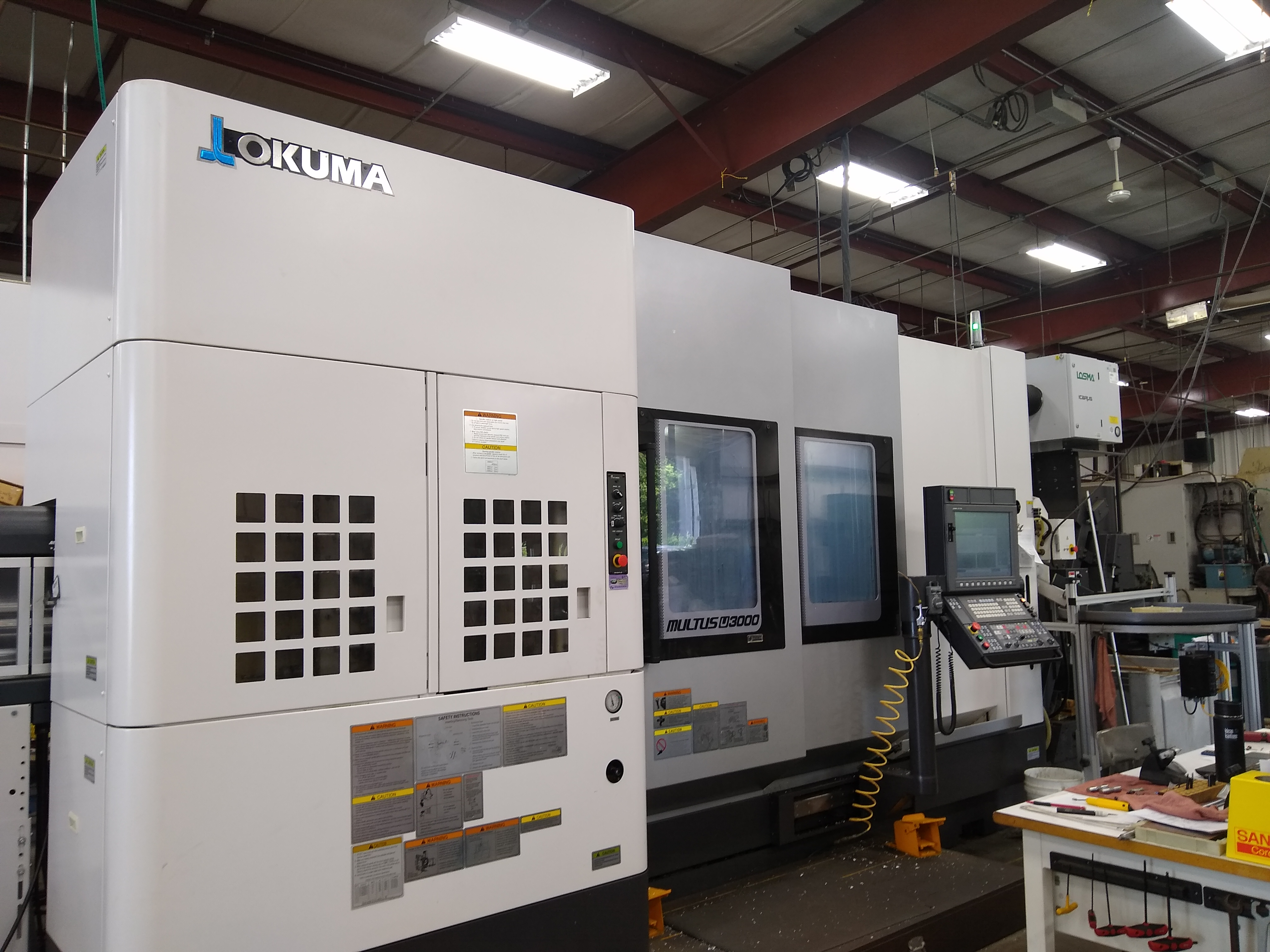
An Okuma MULTUS U3000 multi-tasking machine with automatic tool changer at Lampin Corporation in the Blackstone Valley of Massachusetts.

Most machine tool builders source their CNC controls from partners such as Fanuc, Mitsubishi Electric, Siemens, and Heidenhain. Several builders have developed their own CNC controls over the years (including Mazak, Okuma, Haas, Dalian Kede and others), but Okuma is unusual among machine tool builders for the degree to which it designs and builds all of its own hardware, software, and machine components. This is the company's "Single Source" philosophy.

Okuma's CNC control is called the "OSP" series. It offers closed-loop positioning via its absolute position feedback system. The "OSP" name began as an abbreviation for "Okuma Sampling Pathcontrol".

In an industry that pushes hard for continual technological innovation, Okuma has often been an innovative leader. For example, it has been among the leaders of development for thermal compensation and collision avoidance. Thermal compensation is designing the machine elements and control to minimize the dimensional distortion that results from the heat generated by machining. This is done both by preventing heat buildup (for example, flowing coolant through machine elements formerly not cooled) and by detecting and compensating for temperature rises when they occur (for example, monitoring temperature with a sensor and using the sensor's output signal as input to the control logic). Collision avoidance is designing the machine to predict and prevent interference, for example, having the machine "know" the form and location of all fixturing so that it can foresee a crash and stop its own movement before crashing. Recent innovation includes technology to avoid chatter, both by predicting and preventing it and by early automatic detection and correction (via dynamic changes of speeds and feeds) when it does occur.
