= Lampin Corporation =

American component manufacturer

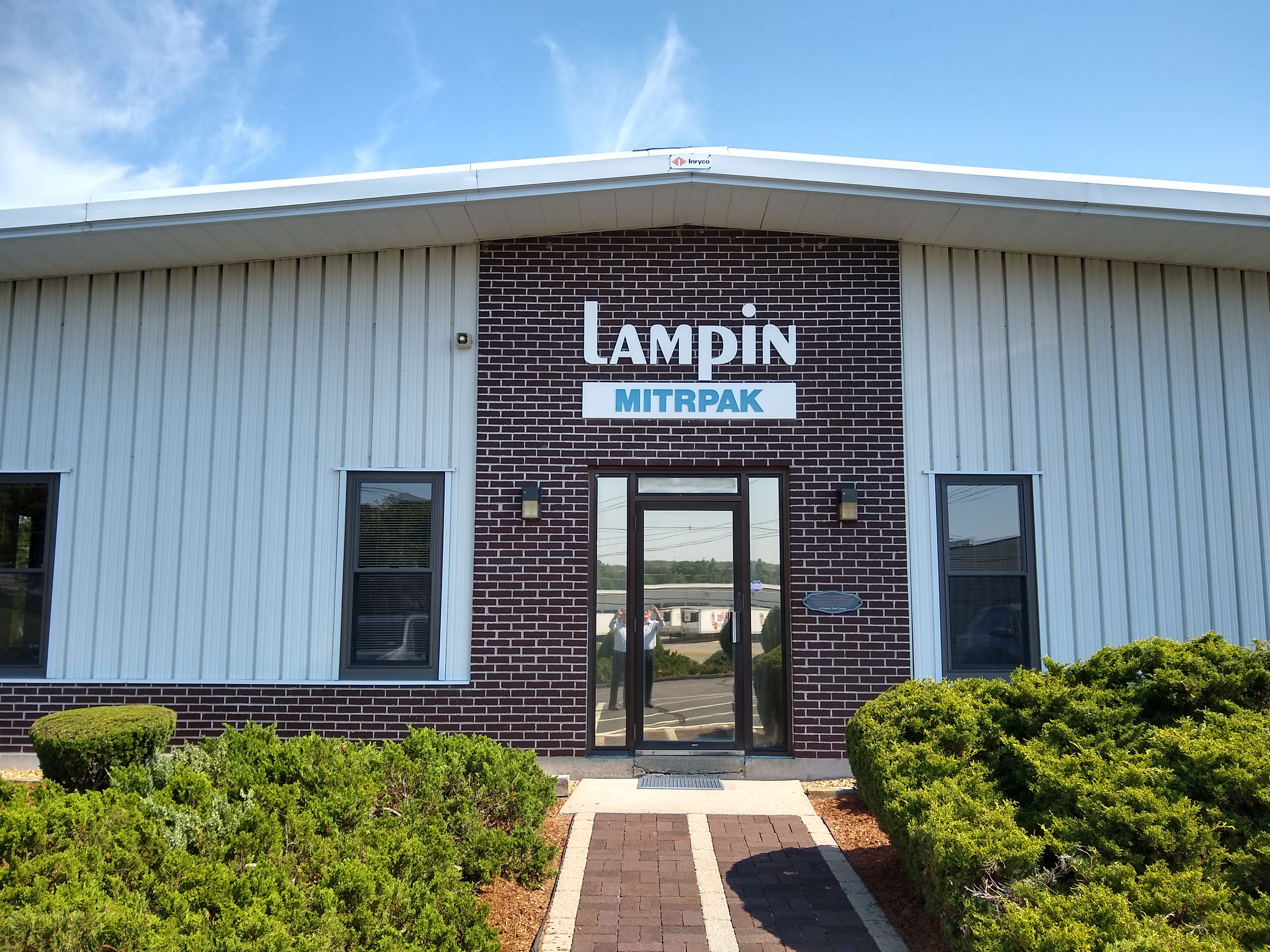
- The Lampin Corporate office in Uxbridge, Massachusetts
- Formerly: Lampin Pinion Gear Company
- Company type: Private
- Industry: Precision manufacturing and engineering
- Founded: Ashland, Massachusetts, United States (1964)
- Founder: Harold Fairbanks
- Headquarters: Uxbridge, Massachusetts, United States
- Area served: Worldwide
- Key people: Floranne R. Reagan (Director); John Biagioni (President)
- Products: Right angle gear drives; Spur gear drives; Mechanical assemblies; Spiral bevel gear drives
- Brands: MITRPAK
- Services: Precision manufacturing, assembly, and services
- Revenue: $7,000,000
- Owner: Employee stock ownership plan (100%)
- Number of employees: 36 (2019)
- Website: lampin.com

Lampin Corporation is a Massachusetts-based component manufacturer and assembler of right angle gear drives, spur gear, and mechanical assemblies, serving the aerospace, medical, optical, semiconductor, food processing, and high-tech industries. Lampin offers design review, supply chain, and inventory management services. Lampin is 100 percent employee-owned.

== History ==
Harold Fairbanks founded the company as the Laminated Pinion Gear Company in 1964. The company was initially headquartered in Ashland, Massachusetts, a town in the Blackstone Valley. In the 1970s, Harold Bushnell purchased the company and moved it to Uxbridge, its headquarters.

On November 23, 1982, Scott Rossiter purchased the company, renaming it the Lampin Corporation. In 1990, Lampin acquired MITRPAK, a line of spiral bevel gear drives, from Johnson & Bassett, a Worcester, Massachusetts company founded in 1870.

Lampin continued to expand, and in 2001, Rossiter elected to sell 30% of the company to the employees through the employee stock ownership plan (ESOP). In 2006, Rossiter sold all the shares to the ESOP, making the company 100 percent employee-owned. In 2013, Lampin received a $74,100 matching grant from the state of Massachusetts to create jobs and train thirty new employees.

Current corporate directors are Floranne R. Reagan, Michael S. Shaw, and Donald J. Romine.

In January 2022, John Biagioni was appointed president following Robin LeClaire's retirement, who will remain on Lampin's board.

== Acquisitions ==
In March 2016, Lampin acquired the precision component manufacturer Howard Precision Products of Framingham, Massachusetts. The company was formerly known as the E. Howard Watch & Clock Company, founded in Massachusetts in 1851. All employees of Howard were offered positions at Lampin and were to be moved to Lampin's facilities in Uxbridge.

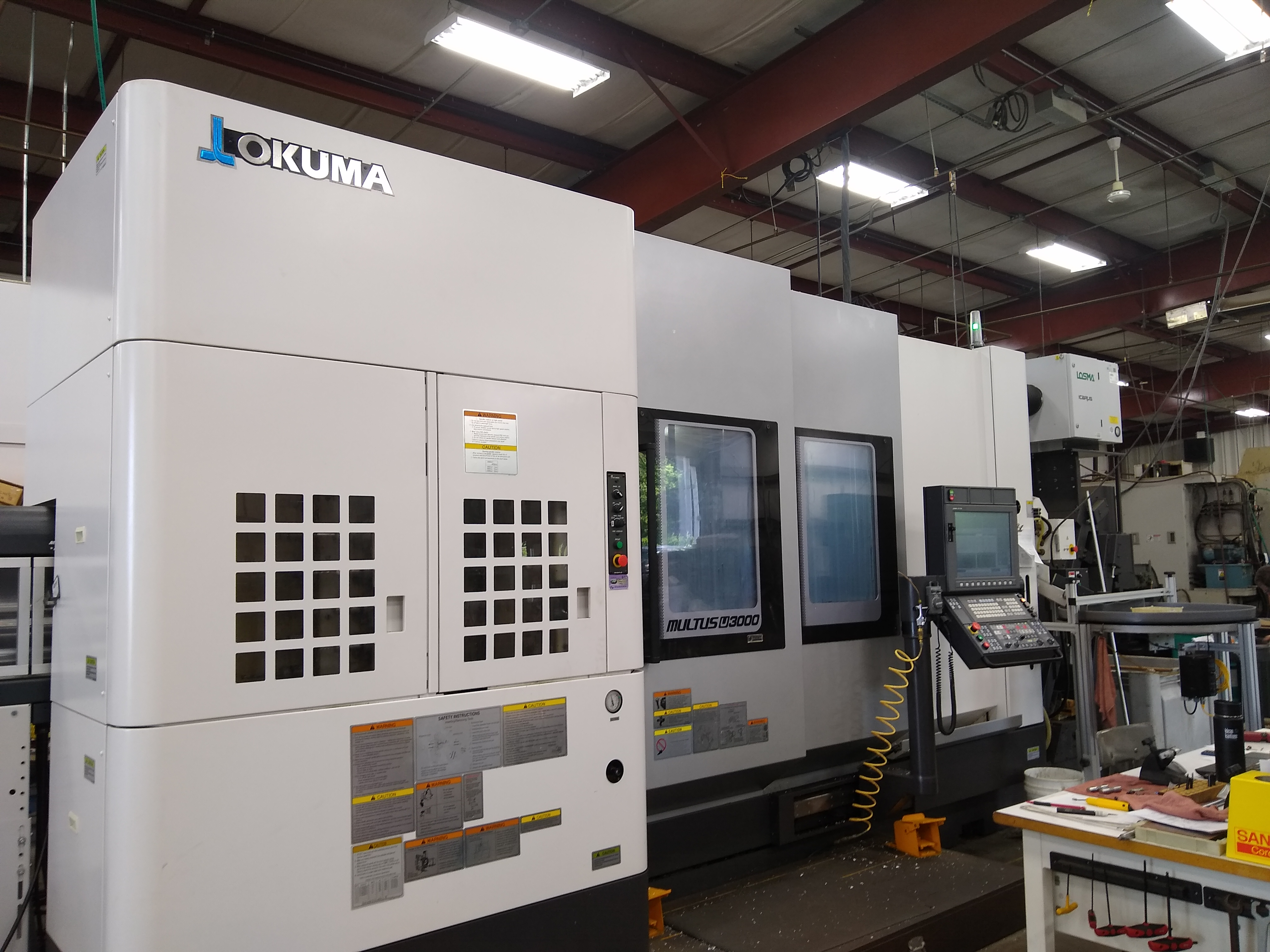
Lampin's Okuma MULTUS U3000 multi-tasking machine with automatic tool changer
