= Ōguchi =

Town in Niwa District, Aichi Prefecture, Japan

Ōguchi 大口町
- Town
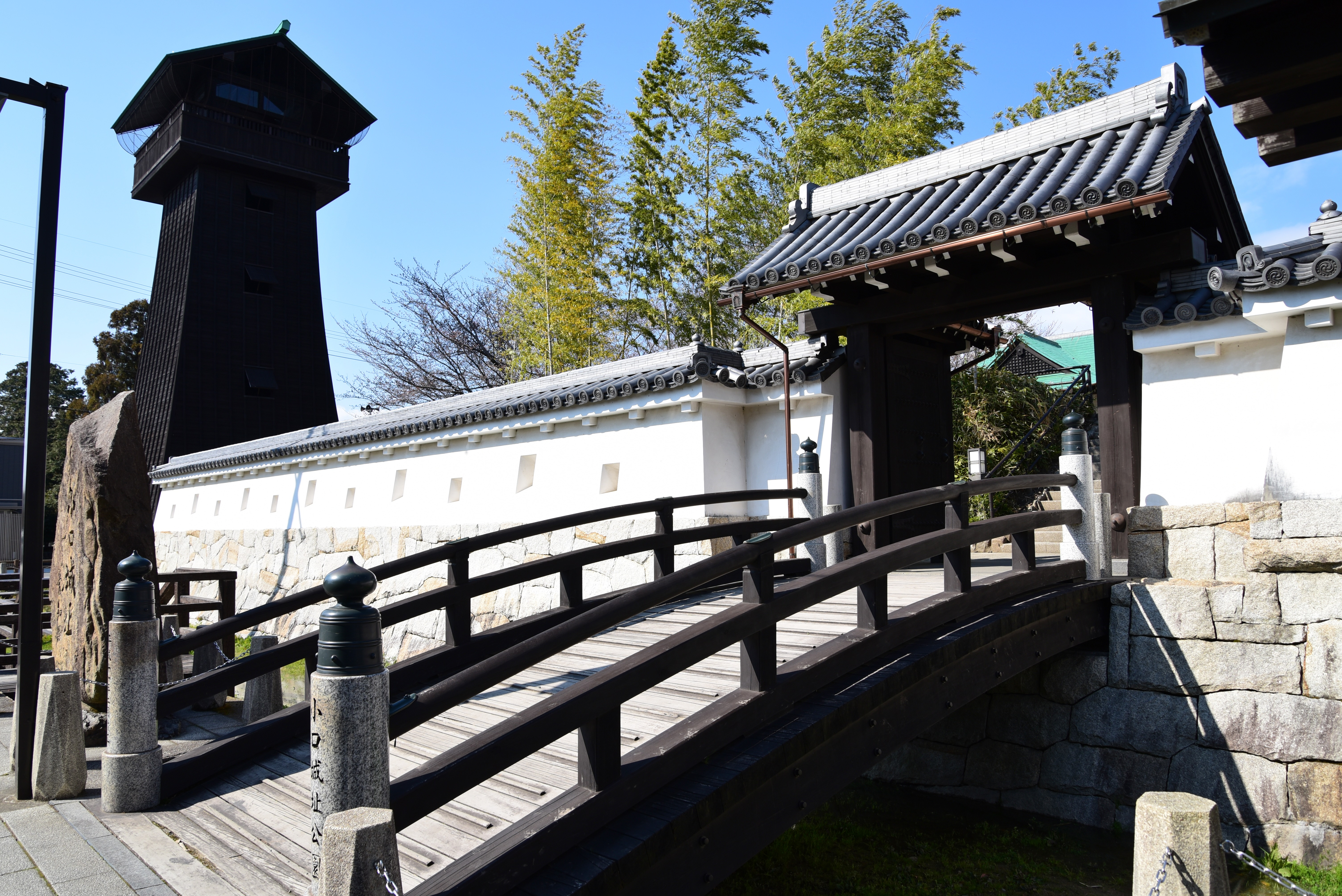
- Reconstructed gate of Ōguchi Castle

- Flag Seal

- Location of Ōguchi in Aichi Prefecture, highlighted in dark yellow

- Coordinates: 35°19′57″N 136°54′28.1″E
- Country: Japan
- Region: Chūbu region Tōkai region
- Prefecture: Aichi Prefecture
- District: Niwa

Government
  - Mayor: Masahiro Suzuki

Area
  - Total: 13.61 km^{2} (5.25 sq mi)

Population (October 1, 2019)
  - Total: 24,160
  - Density: 1,775/km^{2} (4,598/sq mi)
- Time zone: UTC+9 (Japan Standard Time)
- City symbols
  - Tree: Osmanthus fragrans
  - Flower: Sakura
- Website: Official website

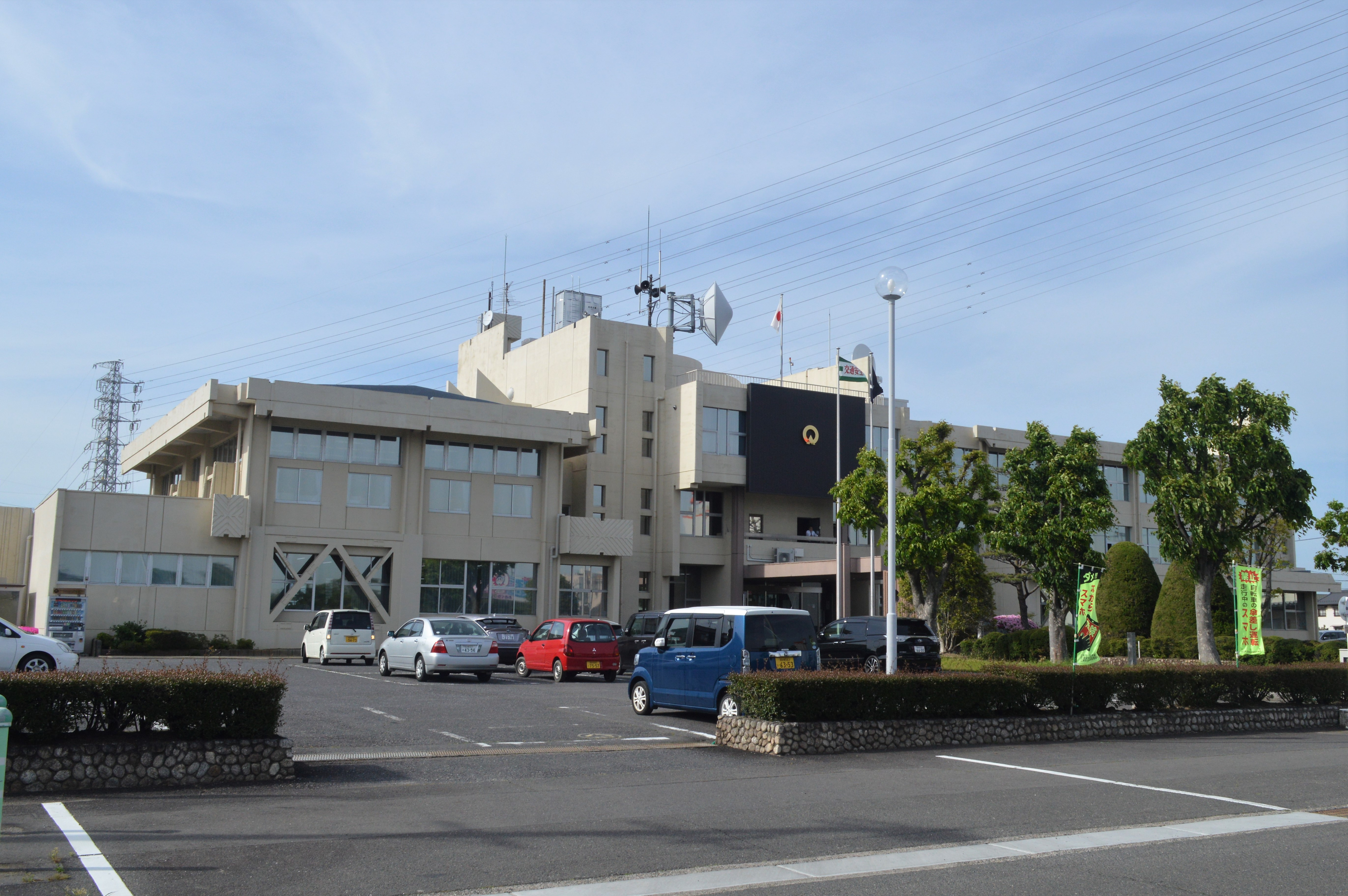
Ōguchi town hall

Ōguchi (大口町, Ōguchi-chō) is a town located in Niwa District, Aichi Prefecture, Japan. As of 1 October 2019, the town had an estimated population of 24,160 in 9547 households, and a population density of 1,775 persons per km^{2}. The total area of the town was 13.61 square kilometres (5.25 sq mi).

== Geography ==
Ōguchi is located in the extreme northeast corner of Aichi Prefecture, in the middle of the Nōbi Plain. The Gojō River flows through the town.

=== Neighboring municipalities ===
- Aichi Prefecture
  - Fusō
  - Inuyama
  - Komaki
  - Kōnan

== Demographics ==
Per Japanese census data, the population of Ōguchi has increased steadily over the past 50 years.

Historical population
Year	Pop.	±%
1940	7,206	—
1950	8,695	+20.7%
1960	10,163	+16.9%
1970	14,898	+46.6%
1980	16,195	+8.7%
1990	17,464	+7.8%
2000	20,633	+18.1%
2010	22,447	+8.8%

=== Climate ===
The town has a climate characterized by hot and humid summers, and relatively mild winters (Köppen climate classification Cfa). The average annual temperature in Ōguchi is 15.6 °C. The average annual rainfall is 1819 mm with September as the wettest month. The temperatures are highest on average in August, at around 28.0 °C, and lowest in January, at around 4.1 °C.

== History ==
The villages of Kashiwamori, Ōta, Ōguchi and Tominari were created within Niwa District, Aichi with the establishment of the modern municipalities system in 1889. On October 1, 1906 Ōta, Ōguchi and Tominari and a portion of Kashiwamori merged to form the village of Ōguchi. It was raised to town status in 1962.

== Economy ==
Okuma Corporation and Yamazaki Mazak Corporation, two global machine tool builder companies have their headquarters in the city, as well as global automotive components supplier Tokai Rika.

== Education ==
Ōguchi has three public elementary schools and one public junior high school operated by the town government, and one public high school operated by the Aichi Prefectural Board of Education..

== Transportation ==
=== Railway ===
Ōguchi is not served by passenger rail transport. The nearest train station is Kashiwamori on the Meitetsu Inuyama Line in neighboring Fusō.

=== Highway ===
- National Route 41
- National Route 155

== Sister city relations ==
- - Matsue, Shimane, Japan, sister city since August 29, 2015

== Local attractions ==
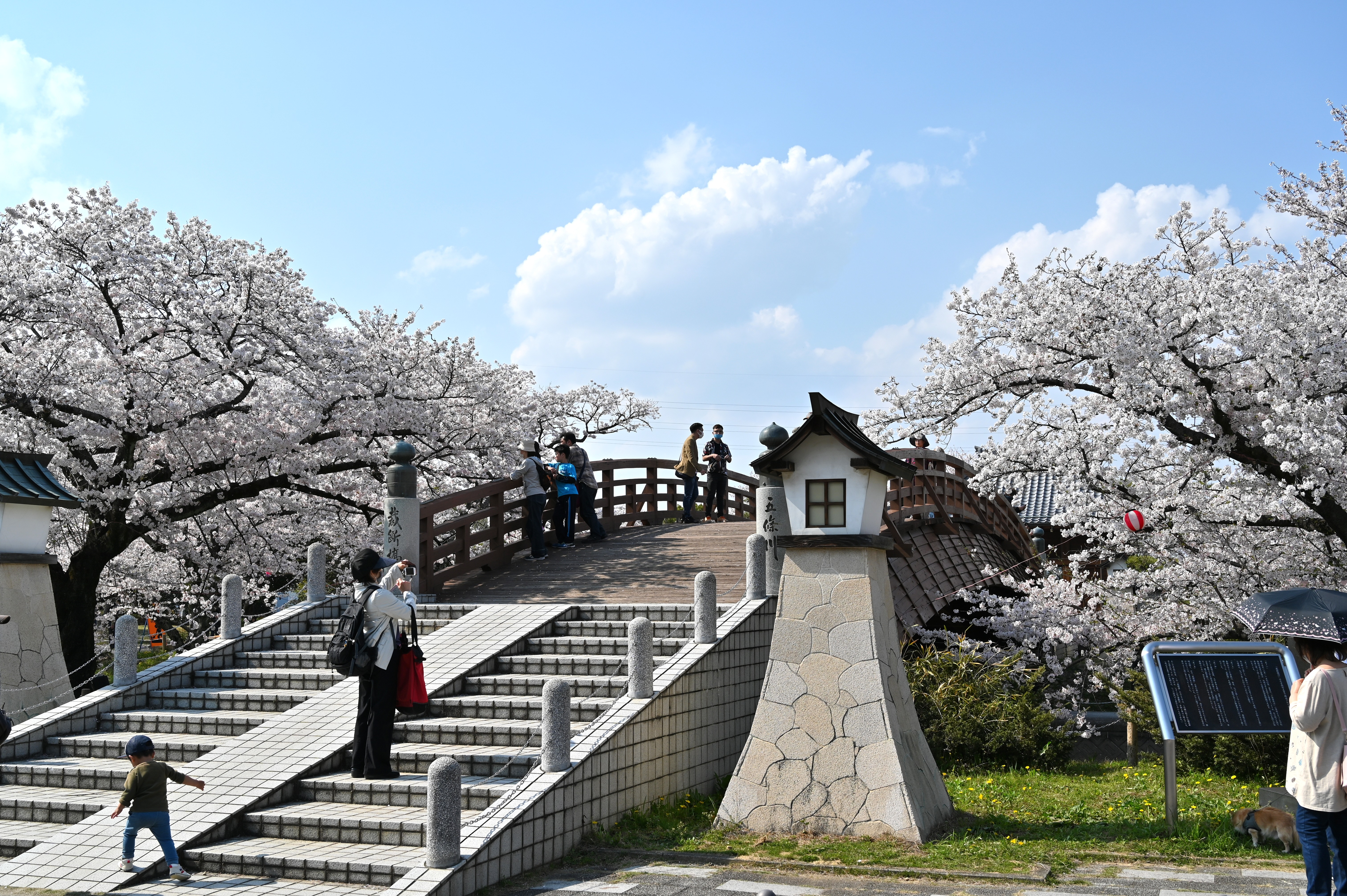
Horioato Park Saidan Bridge

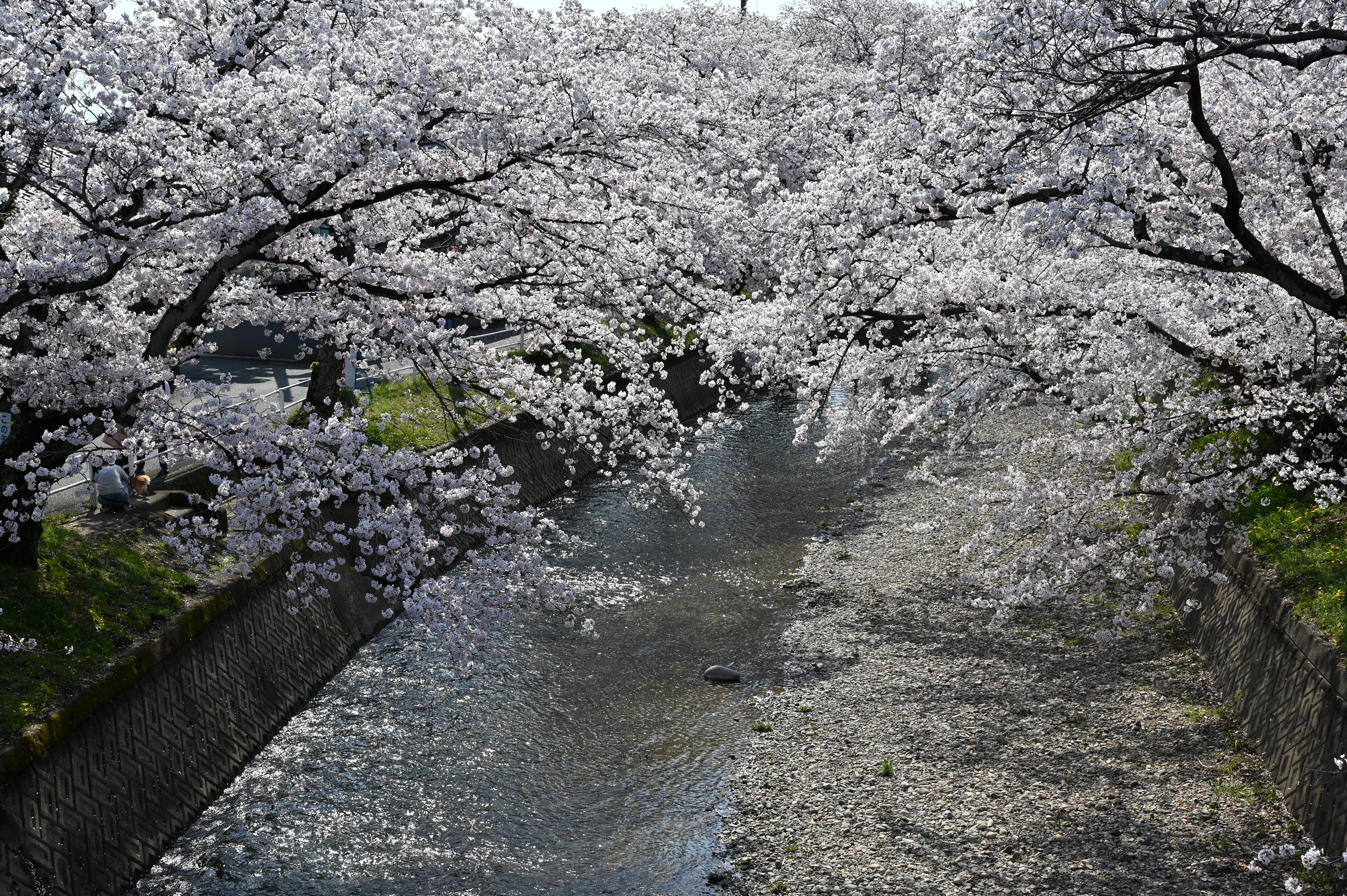
Gojo River

- Ōguchi Castle
