= Shin River (Aichi) =

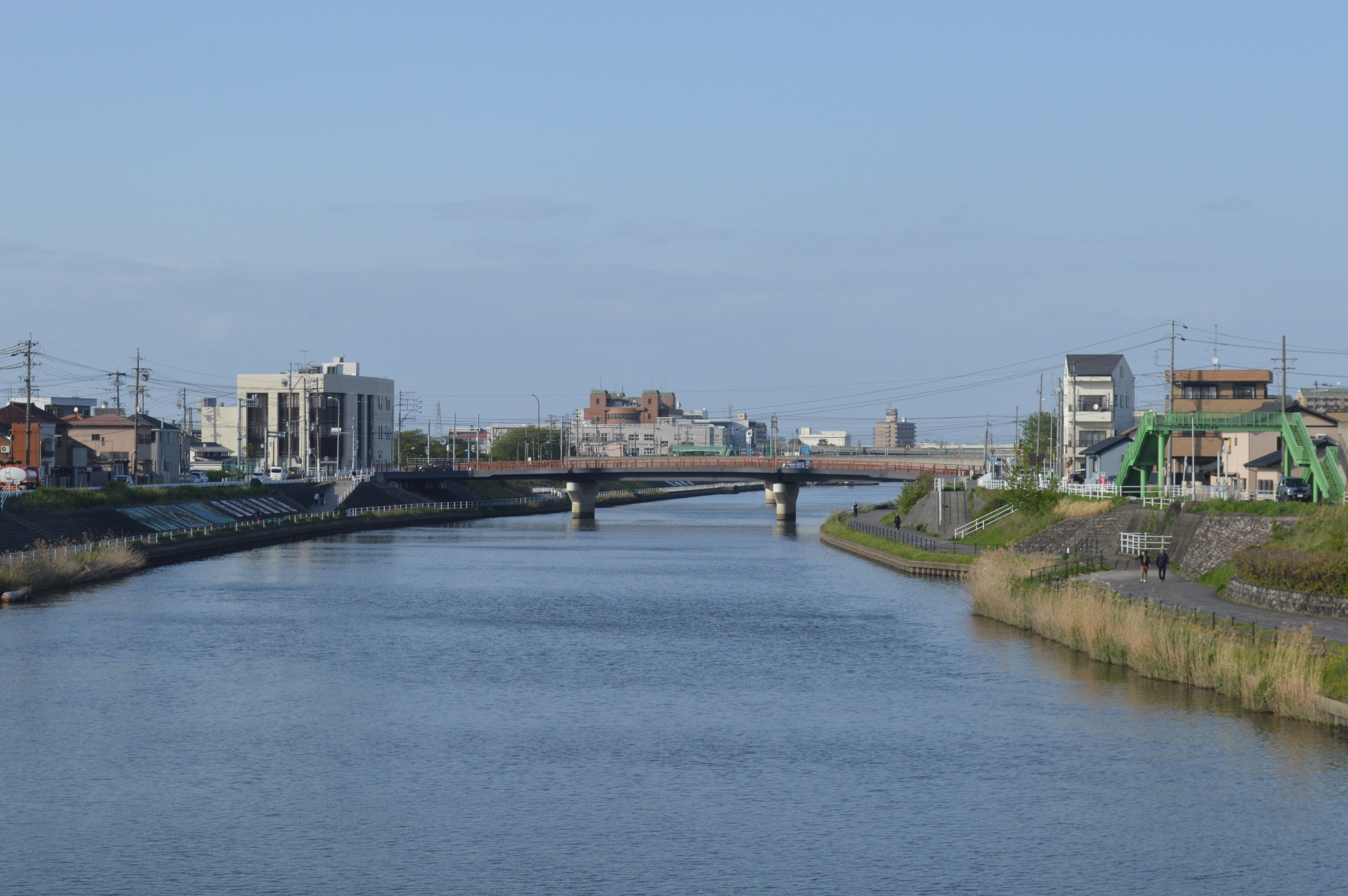

- Native name: 新川 (Japanese)

Location
- Country: Japan
- Region: Chūbu
- Prefecture: Aichi

Physical characteristics
- Mouth
  - location: Ise Bay
- Length: 27 km (17 mi)

Basin features
- River system: Shōnai River

The Shin River (新川, Shin-kawa) flows through Aichi Prefecture, Japan. It is an artificial river, which was dug in the Edo period in order to prevent flooding along the banks of the Shōnai River. It flows through the cities of Kitanagoya, Kiyosu, Ama, Ōharu, and Nagoya.
