= Yamazaki Mazak Corporation =

Japanese machine tool manufacturer

- Native name: ヤマザキマザック株式会社
- Type: Private KK
- Industry: Machinery
- Founded: Nagoya (1919; 107 years ago)
- Founder: Sadakichi Yamazaki
- Headquarters: Ōguchi, Aichi Prefecture, Japan
- Key people: Yoshihiko Yamazaki (Senior Vice Chairman); Tomohisa Yamazaki (President)
- Products: Machining centers; Multitasking machines; CNC systems; CNC laser processing machines; CAD/CAM systems; Production support software
- Number of employees: 7,848 (group total, as of Jul 2016)
- Website: Official website

Yamazaki Mazak Corporation (ヤマザキマザック株式会社, Yamazaki Mazakku Kabushiki-gaisha), commonly referred as Mazak, is a Japanese machine tool builder based in Oguchi, Japan.

== History ==
The company was founded in 1919 in Nagoya by Sadakichi Yamazaki as a small company making pots and pans. During the 1920s it progressed through mat-making machinery to woodworking machinery to metalworking machine tools, especially lathes. The company was part of Japan's industrial buildup before and during the Pacific War, then, like the rest of Japanese industry, was damaged by the war's outcome.

During the 1950s and 1960s, under the founder's sons, Yamazaki revived, and during the 1960s it established itself as an exporter to the American market. During the 1970s and 1980s it established a larger onshore presence in the US, including machine tool-building operations, and since then it has become one of the most important companies in that market and the global machine tool market.

In 1980s, the European manufacturing plant was established in Worcester, U.K., and a worldwide sales and customer support network was created. Currently, the corporation runs 11 factories worldwide - 5 in Japan, 2 in China, 1 in Singapore, 1 in the US, 1 in the UK, 1 in India.

The company runs the Yamazaki Mazak Museum of Art in Aoi, Nagoya.

== Gallery ==
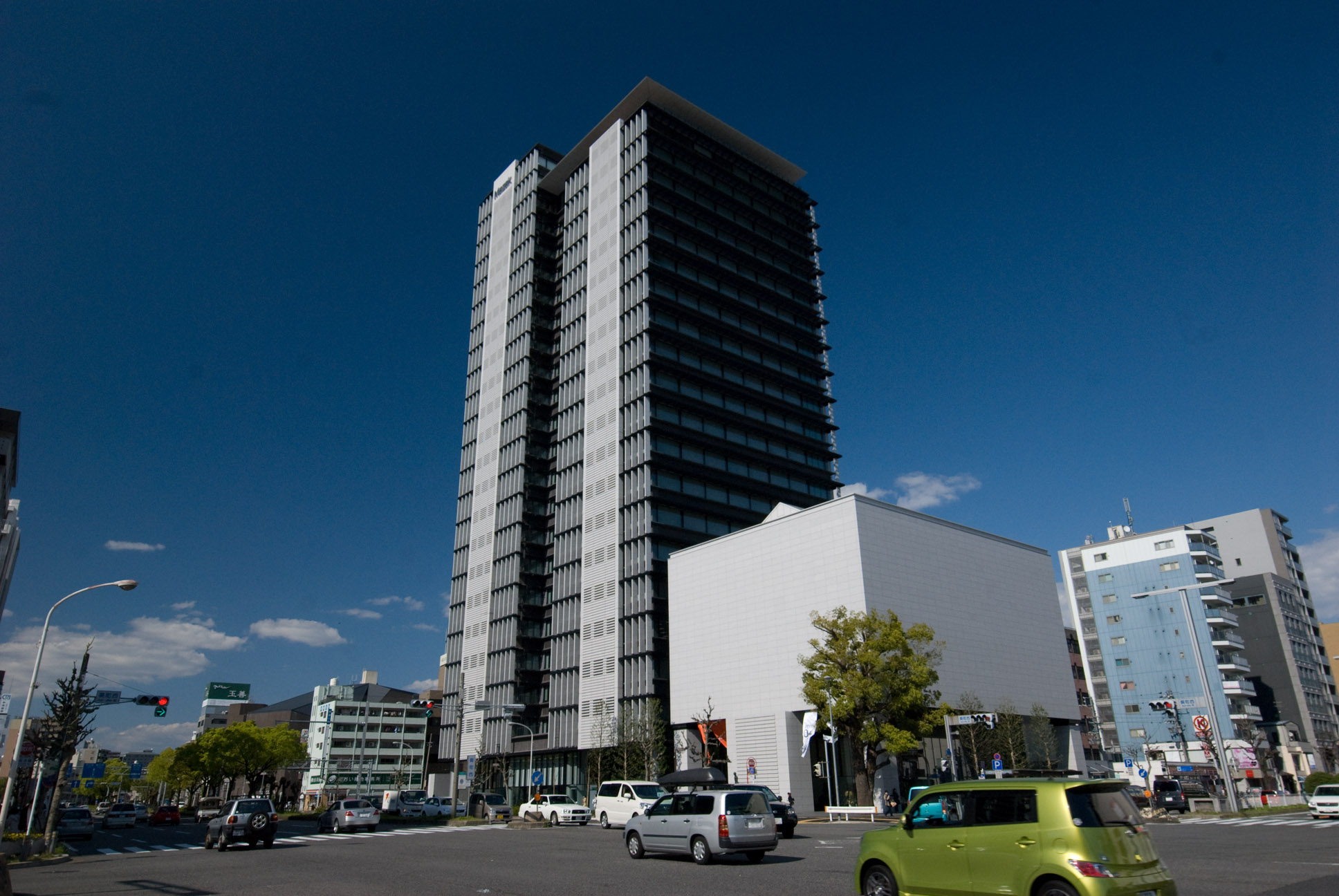
Mazak Art Plaza and the Yamazaki Mazak Museum of Art in Nagoya

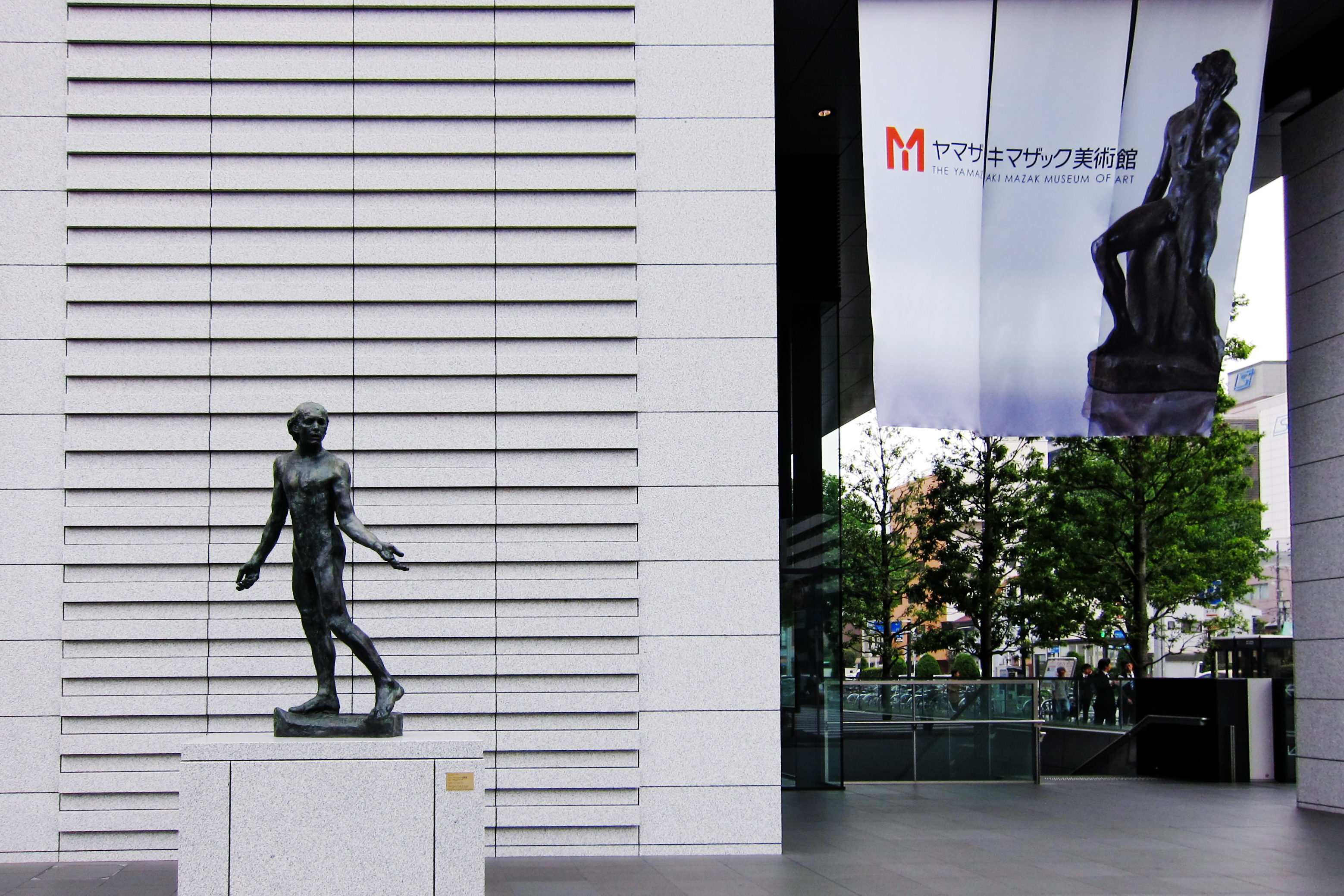
Yamazaki Mazak Museum of Art

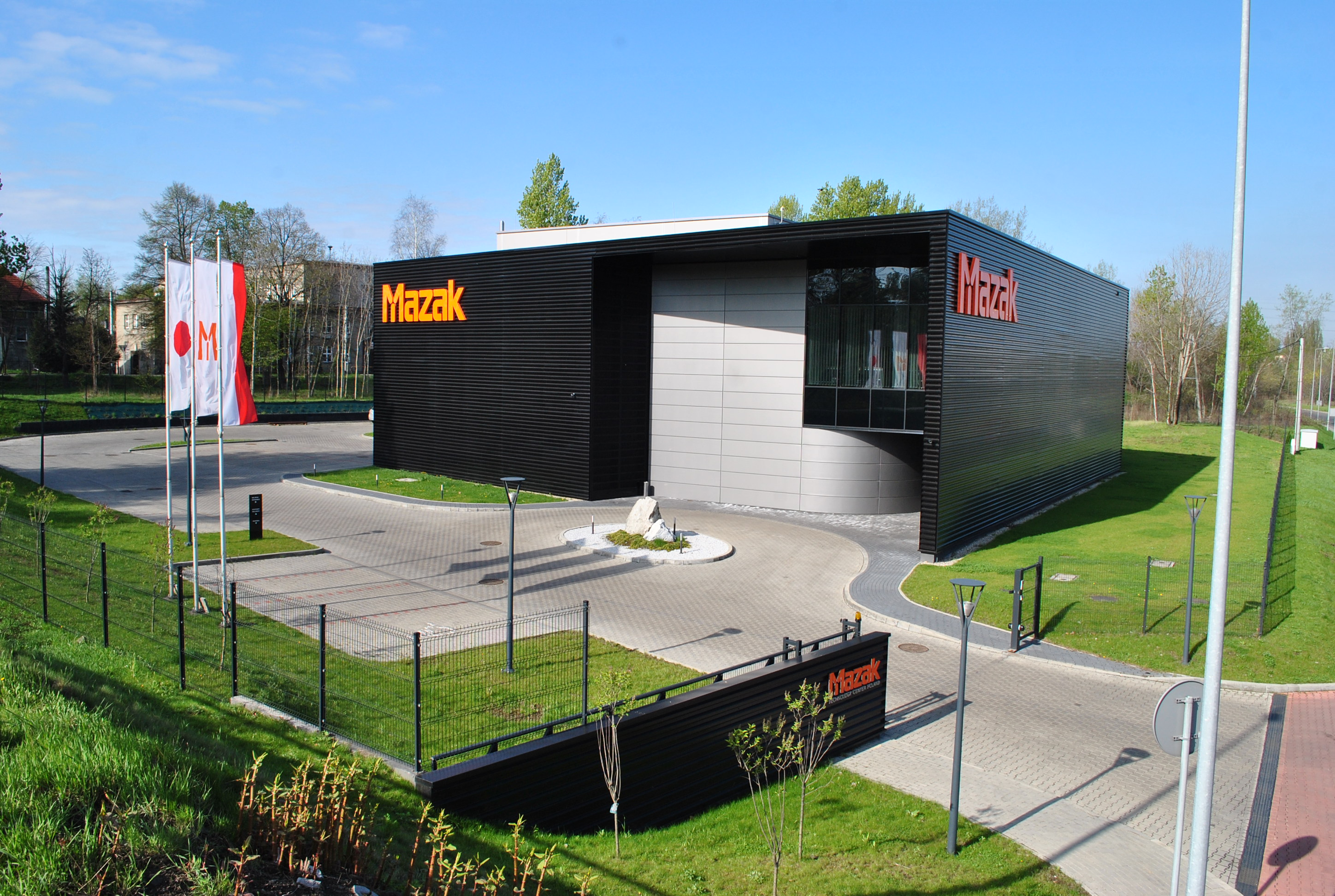
Mazak Technology Center in Katowice, Poland

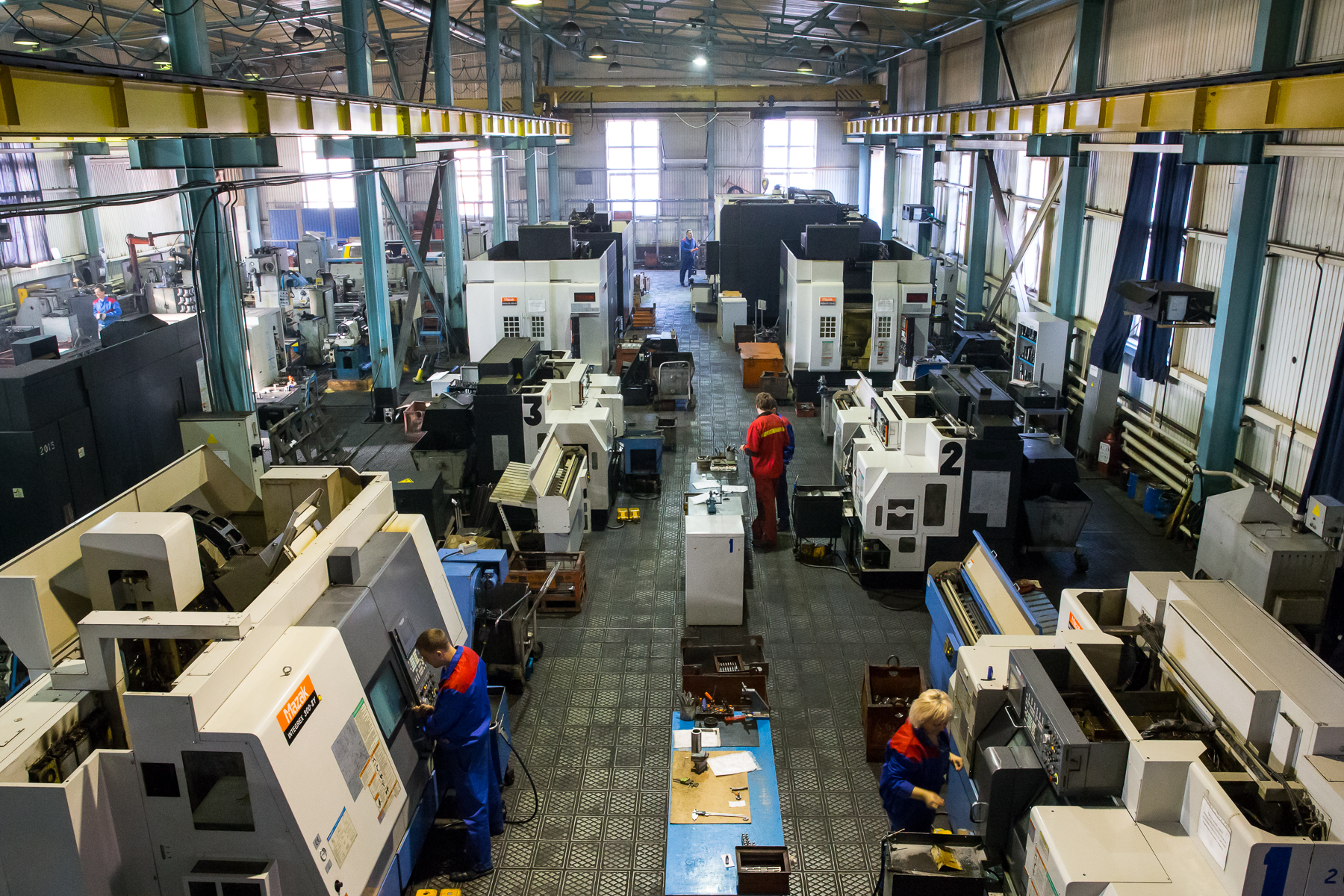
Mazak machines in the Kubanzheldormash machinery company in Armavir, Russia.

== Bibliography ==
- Holland, Max (1989), When the Machine Stopped: A Cautionary Tale from Industrial America, Boston: Harvard Business School Press, ISBN 978-0-87584-208-0, OCLC 246343673.
