= Nikkō River =

Nikkō River 日光川
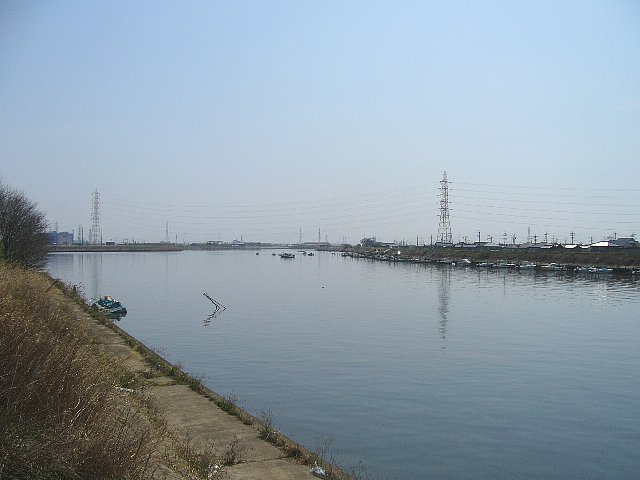

Location
- Country: Japan

Physical characteristics
- Source
  - location: Kōnan
- Mouth
  - location: Ise Bay
- Length: 41 km (25 mi)
- Basin size: 295 km^{2} (114 sq mi)

Basin features
- River system: Kiso River

The Nikkō River (日光川, Nikkō-gawa) flows through Aichi Prefecture, Japan, from the north to the west.

== River communities ==
Aichi Prefecture
Kōnan, Inazawa, Aisai, Tsushima, Kanie, Nagoya, Tobishima
