= Shōnai River =

River in Chūbū, Japan

Coordinates: 35°01′56″N 136°50′34″E

Shōnai River 庄内川
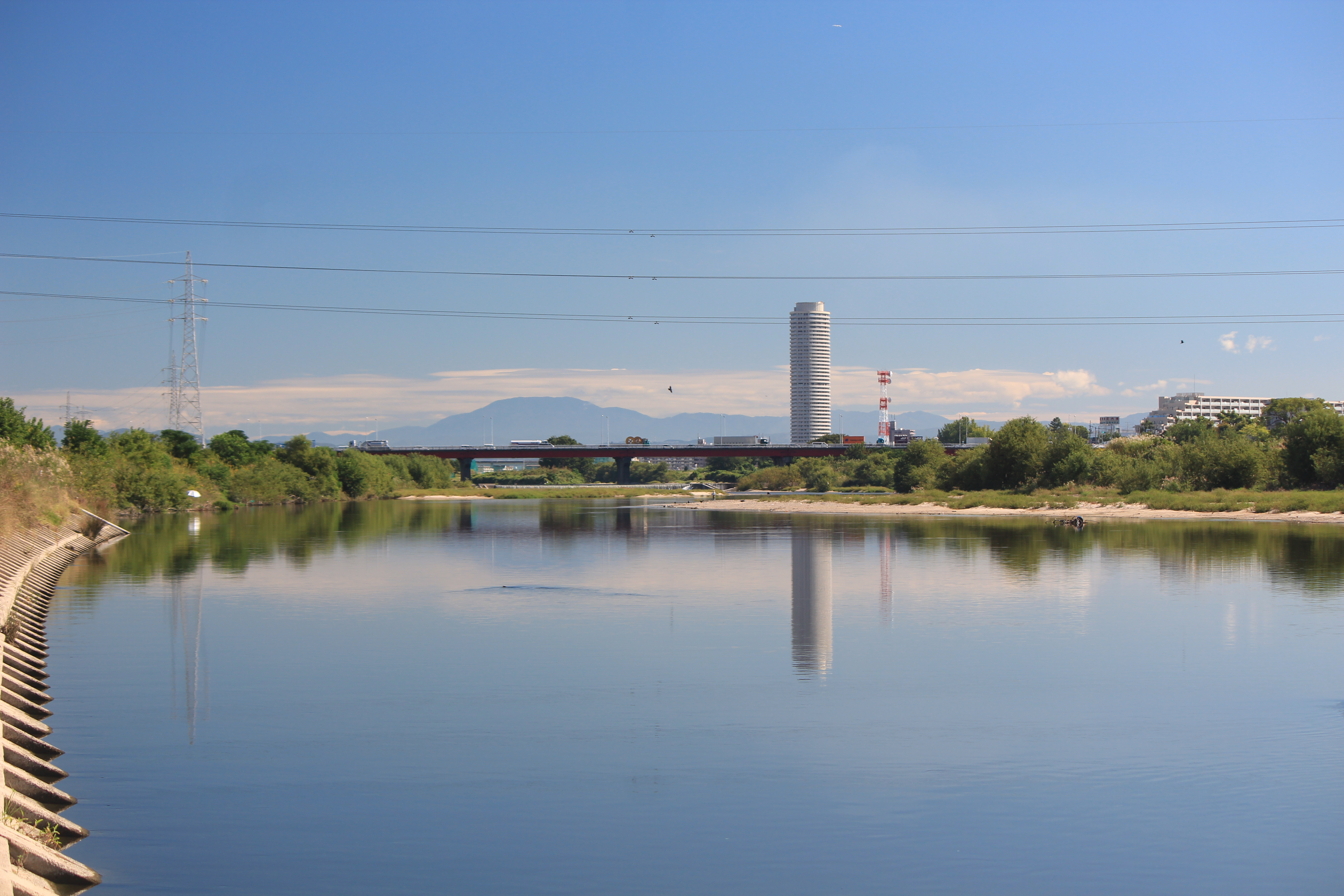
- The Scene Johoku and Shōnai River bridge

Location
- Country: Japan

Physical characteristics
- Source
  - location: Mount Yūdachi
  - elevation: 727 m (2,385 ft)
- Mouth
  - location: Ise Bay
- Length: 96 km (60 mi)
- Basin size: 1,010 km^{2} (390 sq mi)
- Discharge
  - average: 28.21 m^{3}/s (996 cu ft/s)

Basin features
- River system: Shōnai River

The Shōnai River (庄内川, Shōnai-gawa) is a Class 1 river flowing through Gifu and Aichi prefectures in Japan. In Gifu Prefecture, it is also referred to as the Toki River (土岐川 Toki-gawa); around the city of Kasugai in Aichi Prefecture, it is referred to as the Tamano River (玉野川 Tamano-gawa). Fujimae-higata (designated sites as List of Ramsar wetlands of international importance) exists in the River mouth.

== Geography ==
The river originates at Mount Yūdachi in Ena, Gifu Prefecture. After flowing through the Tamano Valley in Aichi Prefecture, it enters the Nōbi Plain, before emptying into Ise Bay through Nagoya's Minato-ku.

== River communities ==
The river passes through or forms the boundary of the communities listed below.

Gifu Prefecture
Ena, Mizunami, Toki, Tajimi
Aichi Prefecture
Seto, Kasugai, Nagoya, Kiyosu, Jimokuji, Ōharu
