= List of Asian Games medalists in softball =

This is the complete list of Asian Games medalists in softball from 1990 to 2026.

== Women ==
Games	Gold	Silver	Bronze
1990 Beijing	China (CHN); An Zhongxin; Chen Tian; Fang Xiufen; He Jing; Huang Yonghong; Liu Juan; Liu Xuqing; Lu Min; Ou Jingbai; Wang Lihong; Wang Xiaoyan; Wang Ying; Wei Jialian; Yan Fang; Yu Jie; Xie Yingmei; Zhang Chunfang	Japan (JPN); Hiromi Ando; Yoshie Fujinawa; Masumi Ichiba; Kyoko Kagawa; Nami Kikuchi; Kaori Kishioka; Yoshimi Kobayashi; Noriko Kurihara; Naomi Matsumoto; Yumiko Miyauchi; Masayo Miyazaki; Mari Nakata; Keiko Noda; Izumi Noki; Kanako Okuni; Akemi Teranishi; Yoko Toyoda	Chinese Taipei (TPE); Chang Hsiao-ching; Chen Hui-ching; Chou Yu-ling; Chung Chiung-yao; Han Hsin-lin; Hsu Chun-hua; Hsu Hsiu-jung; Lai Jung-mei; Lee Mei; Liu Yun-hsiu; Su Yu-chun; Tsai Yu-chun; Tu Hui-ping; Wang Ya-fen; Yang Hui-chun; Yeh Mei-hsiu; Yen Show-tzu
1994 Hiroshima	China (CHN); An Zhongxin; Chen Hong; Lei Li; Liu Xuqing; Liu Yaju; Ma Ying; Ou Jingbai; Song Manli; Tao Hua; Wang Lihong; Wang Ying; Wei Qiang; Xie Yingmei; Yan Fang; Yu Yang; Zhang Chunfang; Zhang Xiaoli	Japan (JPN); Misako Ando; Masumi Ichiba; Mayumi Inoue; Ayuko Ishii; Kumi Kawashima; Kaori Kishioka; Chika Kodama; Mari Nakata; Hisae Ohata; Tamiko Omura; Shigeko Oshima; Haruka Saito; Kaori Sasaka; Saori Tanno; Masako Watanabe; Tomoko Watanabe; Noriko Yamaji	Chinese Taipei (TPE); Chang Hsiao-ching; Chang Mei-lan; Cheng I-wen; Chien Chen-ju; Chiu Chen-ting; Chung Chiung-yao; Feng Shu-fang; Han Hsin-lin; Hsu Chun-hua; Lee Ming-chieh; Liu Chia-chi; Shih Mei-ling; Shih Mei-yun; Tu Hui-ping; Wang Ya-fen; Yang Hui-chun; Yen Show-tzu
1998 Bangkok	China (CHN); An Zhongxin; Chen Hong; Deng Xiaoling; Mu Xia; Qin Xuejing; Tao Hua; Wang Lihong; Wang Xiaoyan; Wang Ying; Wei Qiang; Xu Jian; Yan Fang; Yu Yanhong; Zhang Chunfang; Zhang Yanqing	Japan (JPN); Misako Ando; Yumiko Fujii; Noriko Harada; Taeko Ishikawa; Kumiko Ito; Yoshimi Kobayashi; Shiori Koseki; Naomi Matsumoto; Tomoe Matsumoto; Haruka Saito; Juri Takayama; Reika Utsugi; Miyo Yamada; Noriko Yamaji; Miwa Tanoue	Chinese Taipei (TPE); Chiang Hui-chuan; Chien Chen-ju; Feng Wei-ning; Han Hsin-lin; Hsieh Yu-ping; Hsu Yu-ling; Lai Sheng-jung; Lee Ming-chieh; Lee Szu-ting; Liu Chia-chi; Ou Ching-chieh; Tu Hui-mei; Tu Hui-ping; Wang Ching-lien; Wang Ya-fen
2002 Busan	Japan (JPN); Naomi Arai; Masumi Mishina; Emi Naito; Misako Ando; Yumi Iwabuchi; Sachiko Ito; Yuka Suzuki; Mikiko Tanaka; Yukiko Ueno; Juri Takayama; Kazue Ito; Hiroko Sakai; Noriko Yamaji; Haruka Saito; Reika Utsugi	China (CHN); Li Qi; Zhang Chunfang; Deng Xiaoling; Xin Minhong; Wang Xiaoyan; Mu Xia; Zhou Yi; Wei Qiang; Zhang Yanqing; Zhang Lixia; Yu Meifang; Tao Hua; Meng Lijun; Ye Xiaohe; Zhang Ai	Shared silver
2002 Busan	Japan (JPN); Naomi Arai; Masumi Mishina; Emi Naito; Misako Ando; Yumi Iwabuchi; Sachiko Ito; Yuka Suzuki; Mikiko Tanaka; Yukiko Ueno; Juri Takayama; Kazue Ito; Hiroko Sakai; Noriko Yamaji; Haruka Saito; Reika Utsugi	Chinese Taipei (TPE); Chien Pei-chi; Lo Hsiao-ting; Kung Hsiao-li; Yen Show-tzu; Tung Yun-chi; Huang Hui-wen; Chen Miao-yi; Chung Kai-ning; Wang Ya-fen; Lin Po-jen; Lai Sheng-jung; Yang Hui-chun; Pan Tzu-hui; Chen Feng-yin; Wu Chia-yen	Shared silver
2006 Doha	Japan (JPN); Rei Nishiyama; Masumi Mishina; Ayumi Karino; Emi Naito; Megu Hirose; Sachiko Ito; Eri Yamada; Mariko Goto; Aki Uenishi; Yukiko Ueno; Mariko Masubuchi; Yuko Endo; Yuka Suzuki; Emi Inui; Satoko Mabuchi	Chinese Taipei (TPE); Han Hsin-lin; Lo Hsiao-ting; Lai Meng-ting; Lin Su-hua; Huang Hui-wen; Li Chiu-ching; Chen Miao-yi; Chiang Hui-chuan; Lai Sheng-jung; Wu Chia-yen; Wen Li-hsiu; Tung Yun-chi; Pan Tzu-hui; Hsu Hsiu-ling; Lu Hsueh-mei	China (CHN); Li Qi; Lü Wei; Sun Li; Lü Yi; Zhang Ai; Wu Di; Zhang Lifang; Yu Huili; Li Chunxia; Zhou Yi; Yu Yanhong; Tan Ying; Ding Hong; Jiang Xin; Xin Minhong
2010 Guangzhou	Japan (JPN); Yukiyo Mine; Rei Nishiyama; Ayumi Karino; Haruna Sakamoto; Shizuyo Hamamoto; Misato Kawano; Emi Matsuoka; Eri Yamada; Sayuri Yamane; Mika Someya; Naoko Matsumoto; Yukiko Ueno; Makiko Fujiwara; Satoko Mabuchi; Maki Tanigawa	China (CHN); Lü Wei; Li Qi; Li Chunxia; Lu Ying; Lü Yi; Wei Dongmei; Zhang Lifang; Xu Min; Zhou Yi; Tan Ying; Wang Yuan; Zhao Jing; Guo Jia; Wang Lan; Li Huan	Chinese Taipei (TPE); Lin Su-hua; Li Szu-shih; Chung Hui-lin; Lai Meng-ting; Huang Hui-wen; Li Chiu-ching; Chen Miao-yi; Chueh Ming-hui; Chiang Hui-chuan; Chang Man-hsuan; Lin Pei-chun; Chiu An-ju; Lo Yin-sha; Lu Hsueh-mei; Liu Hui-fang
2014 Incheon	Japan (JPN); Nozomi Nagasaki; Yukiyo Mine; Rei Nishiyama; Yuka Ichiguchi; Yu Yamamoto; Haruna Sakamoto; Rie Nagayoshi; Misato Kawano; Misa Okubo; Eri Yamada; Yamato Fujita; Yukiko Ueno; Kana Nakano; Sayuri Yamane; Minami Sato	Chinese Taipei (TPE); Lin Su-hua; Lin Ying-hsin; Shih Ching-ping; Li Szu-shih; Chung Hui-lin; Lai Meng-ting; Huang Hui-wen; Wang Hsiang-yun; Chen Miao-yi; Chiang Hui-chuan; Liu Yu-han; Lin Pei-chun; Chiu An-ju; Yang Yi-ting; Lu Hsueh-mei	China (CHN); Li Na; Li Qi; Sun Xue; Lu Ying; Feng Qianwen; Wei Dongmei; Jin Lingling; Chen Jia; Liu Yining; Guo Ruomeng; Yuan Jingjing; Zha Dan; Guo Jia; Wang Lan; Li Huan
2018 Jakarta–Palembang	Japan (JPN); Nozomi Nagasaki; Saki Yamazaki; Yuka Ichiguchi; Yu Yamamoto; Kyoko Ishikawa; Nodoka Harada; Misato Kawano; Hitomi Kawabata; Eri Yamada; Mana Atsumi; Minori Naito; Yukari Hamamura; Yamato Fujita; Yukiko Ueno; Natsuko Sugama; Haruka Agatsuma; Saori Yamauchi	Chinese Taipei (TPE); Lin Ying-hsin; Shih Ching-ping; Li Szu-shih; Lin Feng-chen; Lai Meng-ting; Lin Su-hua; Chen Miao-yi; Yen Yi; Tsai Chia-chen; Lin Chih-ying; Liu Hsuan; Su Yi-hsuan; Lin Pei-chun; Chiu An-ju; Yang Yi-ting; Chen Chia-yi; Tu Ya-ting	China (CHN); Wang Mengyan; Xu Qianwen; Liu Lili; Lu Ying; Xi Kailin; Wang Xiaoqing; Chen Jia; Liu Yining; Wang Bei; Zhao Xinxing; Xu Jia; Wang Lan; Li Huan; Zhang Yan; Chai Yinan; Ren Min; Li Qi
2022 Hangzhou	Japan (JPN); Sakura Miwa; Kanna Kudo; Yui Nakamizo; Kyoko Ishikawa; Yui Sakamoto; Nodoka Harada; Ayane Nakagawa; Hitomi Kawabata; Minori Naito; Yukiko Ueno; Misaki Katsumata; Risa Kawamura; Yume Kiriishi; Haruka Agatsuma; Hotaru Tsukamoto; Miu Goto; Haruka Sumitani	China (CHN); Wang Mengru; Wei Yuchen; Xi Kailin; Li Jiaqi; Xie Yue; Chen Jia; Wang Bei; Lu Xiaomin; Xu Jia; Yan Siyu; Dong Zixuan; Wang Lan; Jiang Xinyue; Xie Jiaxin; Chai Yinan; He Xiaoyan; Ren Min	Chinese Taipei (TPE); Shen Chia-wen; Ke Hsia-ai; Li Szu-shih; Lin Feng-chen; Chen Ching-yu; Su Yi-hsuan; Ko Chia-hui; Tsai Chia-chen; Ho Yi-fan; Lin Chih-ying; Liu Hsuan; Chiu An-ju; Chiang Ting-en; Yang Yi-ting; Chen Chia-yi; Chang Chia-yun; Tu Ya-ting
2026 Aichi–Nagoya	Japan (JPN); Mio Sakamoto; Sakura Miwa; Kanna Kudo; Shiho Suto; Kyoko Ishikawa; Ayane Nakagawa; Minori Naito; Eri Shimoyama; Mayu Okawa; Yukiko Ueno; Risa Kawamura; Yui Nakamizo; Urara Fujimoto; Yume Kiriishi; Hotaru Tsukamoto; Miu Goto; Saori Yamauchi	China (CHN); Wang Mengru; Wei Yuchen; Li Xintian; Sang Yujuan; Ding Xiaoyi; Lu Xiaomin; Gui Yuanyuan; Wang Yarui; Yan Siyu; Sun Yue; Yang Huiqi; Xie Jiaxin; Chai Yinan; He Xiaoyan; Ren Min; Lu Ying; Xi Kailin	Chinese Taipei (TPE); Shen Chia-wen; Ke Hsia-ai; Li Szu-shih; Lin Chi-yun; Ho Yi-fan; Chen Ching-yu; Su Yi-hsuan; Chiang Ting-en; Yeh Kuei-ping; Yang An-chi; Pan Yu-ling; Liu Hsuan; Chen Chia-yi; Chu Yi-shan; Tu Ya-ting; Lin Feng-chen; Lin Chih-ying
