= Chinese Taipei at the 1996 Summer Olympics =

- Chinese Taipei Olympic flag
- IOC code: TPE
- NOC: Chinese Taipei Olympic Committee
- Website: www.tpenoc.net (in Chinese and English)

in Atlanta
- Competitors: 74 in 14 sports
- Flag bearer: Tu Tsai-Hsing
- Medals Ranked 61st: Gold 0 Silver 1 Bronze 0 Total 1

Summer Olympics appearances (overview)
- 1956; 1960; 1964; 1968; 1972; 1976–1980; 1984; 1988; 1992; 1996; 2000; 2004; 2008; 2012; 2016; 2020; 2024

Other related appearances
- Republic of China (1924–1948)

The Republic of China competed as Chinese Taipei at the 1996 Summer Olympics in Atlanta, United States.

== Medalists ==
Medal	Name	Sport	Event	Date
Silver	Chen Jing	Table tennis	Women's singles	31 July

== Results by event ==
=== Archery ===
Chinese Taipei entered three women and three men in the archery competition. Two of the archers advanced to the third round, though the team's combined record was 5–8.

Women's Individual Competition:

- Lin Yi-Yin → Round of 16, 13th place (2-1)
- Lin Ya-Hua → Round of 32, 19th place (1-1)
- Yang Chun-Chi → Round of 64, 46th place (0-1)

Men's Individual Competition:

- Hsieh Sheng-Feng → Round of 16, 10th place (2-1)
- Cho Sheng-Ling → Round of 64, 41st place (0-1)
- Wu Tsung-Yi → Round of 64, 44th place (0-1)

Women's Team Competition:

- Lin, Lin, and Yang → Round of 16, 12th place (0-1)

Men's Team Competition:

- Hsieh, Cho, and Wu → Round of 16, 10th place (0-1)

=== Athletics ===
Men's Marathon

- Hsu Gi-Sheng — 2:23.04 (→ 57th place)

Men's Long Jump

- Nai Hui-Fang
  - Qualification — 7.91m (→ did not advance)
- Chao Chih-Kuo
  - Qualification — 7.67m (→ did not advance)

Women's 400m Hurdles

- Hsu Pei-Chin
  - Qualification — 58.80 (→ did not advance)

=== Boxing ===
Men's Light Flyweight (– 48 kg)

- Tsai Chih-Hsiu
  - First Round — Lost to Mansueto Velasco (Philippines) after referee stopped contest in first round

=== Diving ===
Men's 3m Springboard

- Chen Han-Hung
  - Preliminary Heat — 194.13 (→ did not advance, 37th place)

=== Sailing ===
Men's 470

- Brady Sih and Bryant Sih

=== Softball ===
==== Women's team competition ====
- Preliminary Round Robin
  - Lost to Canada (1:2)
  - Lost to Australia (0:4)
  - Defeated Netherlands (7:1)
  - Lost to United States (0:4)
  - Defeated Puerto Rico (2:10)
  - Lost to PR China (0:1)
  - Lost to Japan (1:5)
- Semifinals
  - Did not advance → Sixth place
- Team Roster
  - Yen Show-tzu
  - Wang Ya-fen
  - Yang Hui-chun
  - Han Hsin-lin
  - Chien Pei-chi
  - Chiu Chen-ting
  - Chang Hsiao-ching
  - Tu Hui-ping
  - Chung Chiung-yao
  - Liu Tzu-hsin
  - Ou Ching-chieh
  - Liu Chia-chi
  - Tu Hui-mei
  - Chien Chen-ju
  - Lee Ming-chieh
- Head coach: Wang Cheng-Fu

=== Swimming ===
Men's 100m Breaststroke

- Huang Chih-Yung
  1. Heat – 1:05.26 (→ did not advance, 33rd place)

Women's 50m Freestyle

- Lin Chien-Ju
  1. Heat – 27.00 (→ did not advance, 38th place)

Women's 100m Freestyle

- Chang Wei-Chia
  1. Heat – 58.49 (→ did not advance, 37th place)
- Tsai Shu-min
  1. Heat – 58.65 (→ did not advance, 41st place)

Women's 400m Freestyle

- Lin Chi-Chan
  1. Heat – 4:17.18
  2. B-Final – 4:15.74 (→ 11th place)

Women's 800m Freestyle

- Lin Chi-Chan
  1. Heat – 8:40.31 (→ did not advance, 9th place)

Women's 200m Butterfly

- Hsieh Shu-Tzu
  1. Heat – 2:16.27 (→ did not advance, 18th place)

Women's 400m Individual Medley

- Hsieh Shu-Tzu
  1. Heat – 5:01.70 (→ did not advance, 29th place)

Women's 4 × 100 m Freestyle Relay

- Chang Wei-Chia, Tsai Shu-min, Lin Chien-Ju, and Lin Chi-Chan
  1. Heat – 3:56.39 (→ did not advance, 18th place)

Women's 4 × 200 m Freestyle Relay

- Tsai Shu-min, Chang Wei-Chia, Hsieh Shu-Ting, and Lin Chi-Chan
  1. Heat – 8:27.61 (→ did not advance, 19th place)

Women's 4 × 100 m Medley Relay

- Lin Chien-Ju, Mou Ying-Hsin, Hsieh Shu-Ting, and Tsai Shu-min
  1. Heat – 4:38.90 (→ did not advance, 24th place)

=== Table Tennis ===
Men's Singles Competition

- Chiang Peng-Lung (19 years old), rank 17

Men's Doubles Competition

- Chiang Peng-Lung and Wu Wen-Chia, rank 17

Women's Singles Competition

- Chen Jing (27 years old), rank 2 - Silver medal

Women's Doubles Competition

- Chen Jing and Chen Chiu-Tan, rank 5

=== Tennis ===
Men's Doubles Competition

- Chen Chih-jung and Lien Yu-Hui
  - First round — Lost to Claude N'Goran and Clement N'Goran (Ivory Coast) 2-6 2-6

Women's Singles Competition

- Wang Shi-ting
  - First round — Defeated Adriana Serra-Zanetti (Spain) 7-5 7-6
  - Second round — Lost to Mary Joe Fernandez (USA) 6-7 6-2 1-6

=== Weightlifting ===
Men's Light-Heavyweight

- Wu Tsai-Fu
  - Final — 137.5 + 175.0 = 312.5 (→ 14th place)
- Kuo Tai-Chih
  - Final — 125.0 + 165.0 = 290.0 (→ 16th place)
