= Softball at the 1994 Asian Games =

- Venue: Shudo University
- Dates: 3–7 October 1994
- Nations: 4

Softball was contested by four teams at the 1994 Asian Games in Hiroshima, Japan from October 3 to October 7. The competition took place at the Shudo University.

China won the gold medal in a round robin competition.

== Schedule ==
●	Round	●	Last round

Event↓/Date →	3rd Mon	4th Tue	5th Wed	6th Thu	7th Fri
Women	●	●	●	●	●

== Medalists ==
Event	Gold	Silver	Bronze
Women	China; An Zhongxin; Chen Hong; Lei Li; Liu Xuqing; Liu Yaju; Ma Ying; Ou Jingbai; Song Manli; Tao Hua; Wang Lihong; Wang Ying; Wei Qiang; Xie Yingmei; Yan Fang; Yu Yang; Zhang Chunfang; Zhang Xiaoli	Japan; Misako Ando; Masumi Ichiba; Mayumi Inoue; Ayuko Ishii; Kumi Kawashima; Kaori Kishioka; Chika Kodama; Mari Nakata; Hisae Ohata; Tamiko Omura; Shigeko Oshima; Haruka Saito; Kaori Sasaka; Saori Tanno; Masako Watanabe; Tomoko Watanabe; Noriko Yamaji	Chinese Taipei; Chang Hsiao-ching; Chang Mei-lan; Cheng I-wen; Chien Chen-ju; Chiu Chen-ting; Chung Chiung-yao; Feng Shu-fang; Han Hsin-lin; Hsu Chun-hua; Lee Ming-chieh; Liu Chia-chi; Shih Mei-ling; Shih Mei-yun; Tu Hui-ping; Wang Ya-fen; Yang Hui-chun; Yen Show-tzu

== Results ==
All times are Japan Standard Time (UTC+09:00)

Pos	Team	Pld	W	L	RF	RA	PCT	GB
1	China	6	5	1	30	5	.833	—
2	Japan	6	4	2	18	11	.667	1
3	Chinese Taipei	6	3	3	20	12	.500	2
4	South Korea	6	0	6	0	40	.000	5

Source: Results

3 October; 11:00	Japan	5–0	South Korea	Shudo University, Hiroshima

Team	1	2	3	4	5	6	7	R	H	E
South Korea	0	0	0	0	0	0	0	0	0	0
Japan	0	0	0	0	5	0	X	5	11	0

3 October; 14:00	Chinese Taipei	0–3	China	Shudo University, Hiroshima

Team	1	2	3	4	5	6	7	R	H	E
China	0	1	0	0	0	1	1	3	7	1
Chinese Taipei	0	0	0	0	0	0	0	0	4	1

4 October; 11:00	Japan	0–4	Chinese Taipei	Shudo University, Hiroshima

Team	1	2	3	4	5	6	7	R	H	E
Chinese Taipei	0	0	4	0	0	0	0	4	7	1
Japan	0	0	0	0	0	0	0	0	2	0

4 October; 14:00	China	10–0 (F/6)	South Korea	Shudo University, Hiroshima

Team	1	2	3	4	5	6	7	R	H	E
South Korea	0	0	0	0	0	0	—	0	2	1
China	0	0	4	3	2	1	—	10	15	0

5 October; 9:00	Chinese Taipei	3–0	South Korea	Shudo University, Hiroshima

Team	1	2	3	4	5	6	7	R	H	E
South Korea	0	0	0	0	0	0	0	0	0	1
Chinese Taipei	0	0	3	0	0	0	X	3	5	1

5 October; 12:00	Japan	0–2	China	Shudo University, Hiroshima

Team	1	2	3	4	5	6	7	R	H	E
China	0	0	0	0	2	0	0	2	4	1
Japan	0	0	0	0	0	0	0	0	4	2

5 October; 15:00	Japan	6–0	South Korea	Shudo University, Hiroshima

Team	1	2	3	4	5	6	7	R	H	E
South Korea	0	0	0	0	0	0	0	0	1	1
Japan	2	0	1	0	3	0	X	6	9	1

6 October; 9:00	China	6–1	Chinese Taipei	Shudo University, Hiroshima

Team	1	2	3	4	5	6	7	R	H	E
Chinese Taipei	0	0	0	0	0	0	1	1	3	0
China	0	0	0	1	1	4	X	6	11	0

6 October; 12:00	Japan	3–2	Chinese Taipei	Shudo University, Hiroshima

Team	1	2	3	4	5	6	7	R	H	E
Chinese Taipei	2	0	0	0	0	0	0	2	6	1
Japan	0	0	0	0	0	2	1	3	9	0

6 October; 15:00	China	6–0	South Korea	Shudo University, Hiroshima

Team	1	2	3	4	5	6	7	R	H	E
South Korea	0	0	0	0	0	0	0	0	1	3
China	2	0	0	0	4	0	X	6	10	2

7 October; 10:00	Chinese Taipei	10–0 (F/5)	South Korea	Shudo University, Hiroshima

Team	1	2	3	4	5	6	7	R	H	E
South Korea	0	0	0	0	0	—	—	0	2	2
Chinese Taipei	1	3	0	4	2	—	—	10	14	0

7 October; 13:00	China	3–4 (F/8)	Japan	Shudo University, Hiroshima

Team	1	2	3	4	5	6	7	8	R	H	E
Japan	0	0	0	1	0	2	0	1	4	7	2
China	0	0	0	1	0	2	0	0	3	3	1

== Final standing ==
Rank	Team	Pld	W	L
1st place, gold medalist(s)	China	6	5	1
2nd place, silver medalist(s)	Japan	6	4	2
3rd place, bronze medalist(s)	Chinese Taipei	6	3	3
4	South Korea	6	0	6
