= Softball at the 2002 Asian Games =

- Venue: Gudeok Baseball Stadium
- Dates: 30 September – 6 October 2002
- Competitors: 90 from 6 nations

Softball was contested by six teams at the 2002 Asian Games in Busan, South Korea from September 30 to October 6. The competition took place at Gudeok Baseball Stadium.

== Schedule ==
P	Preliminary round	½	Semifinals	F	Final	G	Grand final

Event↓/Date →	30th Mon	1st Tue	2nd Wed	3rd Thu	4th Fri	5th Sat	6th Sun	
Women	P	P	P	P	P	½	F	G

== Medalists ==
Event	Gold	Silver	Bronze
Women	Japan; Naomi Arai; Masumi Mishina; Emi Naito; Misako Ando; Yumi Iwabuchi; Sachiko Ito; Yuka Suzuki; Mikiko Tanaka; Yukiko Ueno; Juri Takayama; Kazue Ito; Hiroko Sakai; Noriko Yamaji; Haruka Saito; Reika Utsugi	Chinese Taipei; Chien Pei-chi; Lo Hsiao-ting; Kung Hsiao-li; Yen Show-tzu; Tung Yun-chi; Huang Hui-wen; Chen Miao-yi; Chung Kai-ning; Wang Ya-fen; Lin Po-jen; Lai Sheng-jung; Yang Hui-chun; Pan Tzu-hui; Chen Feng-yin; Wu Chia-yen	Shared silver
Women	Japan; Naomi Arai; Masumi Mishina; Emi Naito; Misako Ando; Yumi Iwabuchi; Sachiko Ito; Yuka Suzuki; Mikiko Tanaka; Yukiko Ueno; Juri Takayama; Kazue Ito; Hiroko Sakai; Noriko Yamaji; Haruka Saito; Reika Utsugi	China; Li Qi; Zhang Chunfang; Deng Xiaoling; Xin Minhong; Wang Xiaoyan; Mu Xia; Zhou Yi; Wei Qiang; Zhang Yanqing; Zhang Lixia; Yu Meifang; Tao Hua; Meng Lijun; Ye Xiaohe; Zhang Ai	Shared silver

== Squads ==
Squads

China	Chinese Taipei	Japan	North Korea
Li Qi; Zhang Chunfang; Deng Xiaoling; Xin Minhong; Wang Xiaoyan; Mu Xia; Zhou Yi; Wei Qiang; Zhang Yanqing; Zhang Lixia; Yu Meifang; Tao Hua; Meng Lijun; Ye Xiaohe; Zhang Ai	Chien Pei-chi; Lo Hsiao-ting; Kung Hsiao-li; Yen Show-tzu; Tung Yun-chi; Huang Hui-wen; Chen Miao-yi; Chung Kai-ning; Wang Ya-fen; Lin Po-jen; Lai Sheng-jung; Yang Hui-chun; Pan Tzu-hui; Chen Feng-yin; Wu Chia-yen	Naomi Arai; Masumi Mishina; Emi Naito; Misako Ando; Yumi Iwabuchi; Sachiko Ito; Yuka Suzuki; Mikiko Tanaka; Yukiko Ueno; Juri Takayama; Kazue Ito; Hiroko Sakai; Noriko Yamaji; Haruka Saito; Reika Utsugi	Kang In-sun; Kim Song-ok; U Chun-yong; Kim Jong-ok; Kim Yong; Pak Hye-ok; Ri Myong-hui; Yun Kyong-hui; Kim Song-chun; Sin Myong-hui; Ri Pong-suk; Kim Un-ju; Ri Kyong-hui; Paek Un-hui; Kang Hye-yong
Philippines	South Korea		
Rodelie Gamazon; Eldiza Yator; Marites Arahan; Nelia Lara; Janebeb Balbuena; Ailen Abello; Nimpa Baral; Corazon Soberre; Loverly Parohinog; Mechil Cristobal; Hayde Bongas; Belen Ramirez; Gina Salvador; Karina Aribal; Jenny de Jesus	Park Jin-ri; Pak Sun-yeo; Jung Young-mi; Hu Mi-jin; Cho Hui-ju; Kim Ji-eun; An Yeon-soon; Lee Eun-ju; Park Young-soon; Nam Hee-sun; Park Eun-ok; Kim Eun-jin; Kim Jik-mi; Lee Song-hui; Cho Eun-sil		

== Results ==
All times are Korea Standard Time (UTC+09:00)

=== Preliminary ===
Pos	Team	Pld	W	L	RF	RA	PCT	GB	Qualification
1	Japan	5	5	0	17	0	1.000	—	Semifinals
2	Chinese Taipei	5	3	2	9	5	.600 (Note: Tied on head-to-head wins (1). Head-to-head runs against: TPE 3, CHN 6, PRK 7.)	2	Semifinals
3	China	5	3	2	14	11	.600	2	Semifinals
4	North Korea	5	3	2	12	9	.600	2	Semifinals
5	South Korea	5	1	4	7	9	.200	4	
6	Philippines	5	0	5	0	25	.000	5	

Source: Official website
Notes:

30 September; 10:00	Philippines	0–5	South Korea	Gudeok Baseball Stadium, Busan
30 September; 10:00	LP: Corazon Soberre		WP: Park Young-soon	Gudeok Baseball Stadium, Busan

Team	1	2	3	4	5	6	7	R	H	E
South Korea	1	2	0	0	0	2	0	5	7	0
Philippines	0	0	0	0	0	0	0	0	7	3

30 September; 12:30	North Korea	0–1	Japan	Gudeok Baseball Stadium, Busan
30 September; 12:30	LP: Kim Song-chun		WP: Hiroko Sakai	Gudeok Baseball Stadium, Busan

Team	1	2	3	4	5	6	7	R	H	E
Japan	0	0	0	1	0	0	0	1	4	1
North Korea	0	0	0	0	0	0	0	0	1	1

30 September; 15:00	China	1–4	Chinese Taipei	Gudeok Baseball Stadium, Busan
30 September; 15:00	LP: Zhang Yanqing		WP: Lai Sheng-jung	Gudeok Baseball Stadium, Busan

Team	1	2	3	4	5	6	7	R	H	E
Chinese Taipei	0	1	0	2	0	1	0	4	8	1
China	0	0	0	0	0	0	1	1	5	0

1 October; 10:00	North Korea	2–1	Chinese Taipei	Gudeok Baseball Stadium, Busan
1 October; 10:00	WP: Kim Song-chun		LP: Chung Kai-ning	Gudeok Baseball Stadium, Busan

Team	1	2	3	4	5	6	7	R	H	E
Chinese Taipei	0	0	1	0	0	0	0	1	6	4
North Korea	2	0	0	0	0	0	X	2	4	2

1 October; 12:30	Philippines	0–9	Japan	Gudeok Baseball Stadium, Busan
1 October; 12:30	LP: Eldiza Yator		WP: Juri Takayama	Gudeok Baseball Stadium, Busan

Team	1	2	3	4	5	6	7	R	H	E
Japan	0	1	2	0	4	2	0	9	11	0
Philippines	0	0	0	0	0	0	0	0	2	1

1 October; 15:00	China	3–0	South Korea	Gudeok Baseball Stadium, Busan
1 October; 15:00	WP: Zhang Lixia		LP: Kim Jik-mi	Gudeok Baseball Stadium, Busan

Team	1	2	3	4	5	6	7	R	H	E
South Korea	0	0	0	0	0	0	0	0	1	2
China	0	0	0	0	0	3	X	3	4	0

2 October; 10:00	China	6–2	North Korea	Gudeok Baseball Stadium, Busan
2 October; 10:00	WP: Zhang Yanqing		LP: Kim Song-chun	Gudeok Baseball Stadium, Busan

Team	1	2	3	4	5	6	7	R	H	E
North Korea	1	1	0	0	0	0	0	2	4	3
China	0	0	0	2	3	1	X	6	11	2

2 October; 12:30	Chinese Taipei	2–0	Philippines	Gudeok Baseball Stadium, Busan
2 October; 12:30	WP: Lai Sheng-jung		LP: Corazon Soberre	Gudeok Baseball Stadium, Busan

Team	1	2	3	4	5	6	7	R	H	E
Philippines	0	0	0	0	0	0	0	0	4	2
Chinese Taipei	1	0	0	0	0	1	X	2	6	1

2 October; 15:00	Japan	1–0 (F/8)	South Korea	Gudeok Baseball Stadium, Busan
2 October; 15:00	WP: Hiroko Sakai		LP: Lee Song-hui	Gudeok Baseball Stadium, Busan

Team	1	2	3	4	5	6	7	8	R	H	E
South Korea	0	0	0	0	0	0	0	0	0	1	0
Japan	0	0	0	0	0	0	0	1	1	4	0

3 October; 10:00	Philippines	0–4	China	Gudeok Baseball Stadium, Busan
3 October; 10:00	LP: Corazon Soberre		WP: Li Qi	Gudeok Baseball Stadium, Busan

Team	1	2	3	4	5	6	7	R	H	E
China	0	0	0	2	2	0	0	4	6	0
Philippines	0	0	0	0	0	0	0	0	5	2

3 October; 12:30	South Korea	1–3	North Korea	Gudeok Baseball Stadium, Busan
3 October; 12:30	LP: Kim Jik-mi		WP: Kim Song-chun	Gudeok Baseball Stadium, Busan

Team	1	2	3	4	5	6	7	R	H	E
North Korea	0	0	0	0	3	0	0	3	3	2
South Korea	0	0	0	0	0	1	0	1	4	2

3 October; 15:00	Japan	1–0	Chinese Taipei	Gudeok Baseball Stadium, Busan
3 October; 15:00	WP: Juri Takayama		LP: Chung Kai-ning	Gudeok Baseball Stadium, Busan

Team	1	2	3	4	5	6	7	R	H	E
Chinese Taipei	0	0	0	0	0	0	0	0	6	0
Japan	0	0	0	0	0	0	1	1	6	0

4 October; 10:00	Philippines	0–5	North Korea	Gudeok Baseball Stadium, Busan
4 October; 10:00	LP: Corazon Soberre		WP: Kang Hye-yong	Gudeok Baseball Stadium, Busan

Team	1	2	3	4	5	6	7	R	H	E
North Korea	0	3	0	0	2	0	0	5	5	0
Philippines	0	0	0	0	0	0	0	0	4	2

4 October; 12:30	Chinese Taipei	2–1 (F/8)	South Korea	Gudeok Baseball Stadium, Busan
4 October; 12:30	WP: Lin Po-jen		LP: Park Young-soon	Gudeok Baseball Stadium, Busan

Team	1	2	3	4	5	6	7	8	R	H	E
South Korea	0	0	0	0	1	0	0	0	1	5	1
Chinese Taipei	0	0	0	1	0	0	0	1	2	4	1

4 October; 15:00	Japan	5–0	China	Gudeok Baseball Stadium, Busan
4 October; 15:00	WP: Juri Takayama		LP: Zhang Yanqing	Gudeok Baseball Stadium, Busan

Team	1	2	3	4	5	6	7	R	H	E
China	0	0	0	0	0	0	0	0	3	2
Japan	0	1	0	2	0	2	X	5	12	0

=== Final round ===
Semifinals
1	Japan (F/6)	10
2	Chinese Taipei	0
3	China	8
4	North Korea	1

Final
2	Chinese Taipei
3	China

Grand final
1	Japan
Bye

==== Semifinals ====
5 October; 10:00	North Korea	1–8	China	Gudeok Baseball Stadium, Busan
5 October; 10:00	LP: Kim Song-chun		WP: Zhang Yanqing	Gudeok Baseball Stadium, Busan

Team	1	2	3	4	5	6	7	R	H	E
China	0	0	0	0	1	0	7	8	11	0
North Korea	0	0	1	0	0	0	0	1	5	1

5 October; 13:00	Chinese Taipei	0–10 (F/6)	Japan	Gudeok Baseball Stadium, Busan
5 October; 13:00	LP: Chung Kai-ning		WP: Juri Takayama	Gudeok Baseball Stadium, Busan

Team	1	2	3	4	5	6	7	R	H	E
Japan	0	3	1	0	5	1	—	10	15	1
Chinese Taipei	0	0	0	0	0	0	—	0	5	2

==== Final ====
6 October; 10:00	Chinese Taipei	Rainout	China	Gudeok Baseball Stadium, Busan

Team	1	2	3	4	5	6	7	R	H	E
China	—	—	—	—	—	—	—	—	—	—
Chinese Taipei	—	—	—	—	—	—	—	—	—	—

==== Grand final ====
6 October; 13:00	Japan	Rainout	Winner of final	Gudeok Baseball Stadium, Busan

Team	1	2	3	4	5	6	7	R	H	E
Winner of final	—	—	—	—	—	—	—	—	—	—
Japan	—	—	—	—	—	—	—	—	—	—

- The ranking was decided with preliminary round and semifinals results due to rainy weather on final competition. Japan was awarded the gold medal based on its unbeaten record in preliminary games. China and Taiwan shared the silver. Those two were to have played to decide who would meet Japan in the gold-medal match.

== Final standing ==
Rank	Team	Pld	W	L
1st place, gold medalist(s)	Japan	6	6	0
2nd place, silver medalist(s)	China	6	4	2
2nd place, silver medalist(s)	Chinese Taipei	6	3	3
4	North Korea	6	3	3
5	South Korea	5	1	4
6	Philippines	5	0	5
