= Chinese Taipei at the 2008 Summer Olympics =

- Chinese Taipei Olympic flag
- IOC code: TPE
- NOC: Chinese Taipei Olympic Committee
- Website: www.tpenoc.net (in Chinese and English)

in Beijing
- Competitors: 80 in 15 sports
- Flag bearer: Lai Sheng-jung
- Medals Ranked 45th: Gold 1 Silver 1 Bronze 2 Total 4

Summer Olympics appearances (overview)
- 1956; 1960; 1964; 1968; 1972; 1976–1980; 1984; 1988; 1992; 1996; 2000; 2004; 2008; 2012; 2016; 2020; 2024

Other related appearances
- Republic of China (1924–1948)

Taiwan competed as Chinese Taipei at the 2008 Summer Olympics in Beijing, where it sent 80 competitors in a record 15 sports. Since 1984, athletes from Taiwan have competed at the Olympics as "Chinese Taipei", not as the "Republic of China (ROC)", due to opposition from the People's Republic of China.

According to the Taipei Times,

For the Beijing Olympics, Taiwan has asked the International Olympic Committee to guarantee that there will be no political interference and no discrimination against Taiwanese athletes. China has promised that it will treat Taiwanese players fairly and in line with the Olympic Charter.

As in previous editions of the Summer Olympics, the flag of the Republic of China was not displayed. Instead, the Chinese Taipei Olympic flag was waved by fans, and displayed when the team won a medal. The National Banner Song, not the National Anthem of the Republic of China, was played at the gold medal ceremony.

== Medalists ==
Medal	Name	Sport	Event	Date
Gold	Chen Wei-ling	Weightlifting	Women's 48 kg	9 August
Silver	Lu Ying-chi	Weightlifting	Women's 63 kg	12 August
Bronze	Chu Mu-yen	Taekwondo	Men's 58 kg	20 August
Bronze	Sung Yu-chi	Taekwondo	Men's 68 kg	21 August

== Archery ==
At the 2007 World Outdoor Target Championships, Chinese Taipei's men's team placed fourth and its women's team placed fifth. This qualified the nation to send full teams of three men and three women to the Olympics.

Men

Athlete	Event	Ranking round		Round of 64	Round of 32	Round of 16	Quarterfinals	Semifinals	Final / BM	
Athlete	Event	Score	Seed	Opposition Score	Opposition Score	Opposition Score	Opposition Score	Opposition Score	Opposition Score	Rank
Chen Szu-yuan	Individual	654	38	Marbawi (MAS) (27); W 107–106	Tsyrempilov (RUS) (6); L 101–109	Did not advance				
Kuo Cheng-wei	Individual	659	29	Javier (PHI) (36); W 106–102	Park K-M (KOR) (4); L 110–111	Did not advance				
Wang Cheng-pang	Individual	667	11	Peljor (BHU) (54); W 110–100	Moriya (JPN) (22); L 109–114	Did not advance				
Chen Szu-Yuan; Kuo Cheng-wei; Wang Cheng-pang	Team	1980	7	—		United States (10); W 222–218	Ukraine (2); L 211–214	Did not advance		

Women

Athlete	Event	Ranking round		Round of 64	Round of 32	Round of 16	Quarterfinals	Semifinals	Final / BM	
Athlete	Event	Score	Seed	Opposition Score	Opposition Score	Opposition Score	Opposition Score	Opposition Score	Opposition Score	Rank
Wei Pi-hsiu	Individual	585	58	Williamson (GBR) (7); L 99–108	Did not advance					
Wu Hui-ju	Individual	634	29	Brito (VEN) (36); L 98–104	Did not advance					
Yuan Shu-chi	Individual	652	6	Feeney (AUS) (59); W 104–101	Zhang Jj (CHN) (27); L 105–110	Did not advance				
Yuan Shu-chi; Wu Hui-ju; Yuan Shu-chi	Team	1871	8	—		Italy (9); L 211–215	Did not advance			9

== Athletics ==
Key

- Note–Ranks given for track events are within the athlete's heat only
- Q = Qualified for the next round
- q = Qualified for the next round as a fastest loser or, in field events, by position without achieving the qualifying target
- NR = National record
- N/A = Round not applicable for the event
- Bye = Athlete not required to compete in round

Men
Track & road events

Athlete	Event	Final	
Athlete	Event	Result	Rank
Wu Wen-chien	Marathon	2:26:55	59

Field events

Athlete	Event	Qualification		Final	
Athlete	Event	Distance	Position	Distance	Position
Chang Ming-huang	Shot put	17.43	40	Did not advance	

Women
Field events

Athlete	Event	Qualification		Final	
Athlete	Event	Distance	Position	Distance	Position
Lin Chia-ying	Shot put	16.32	28	Did not advance	

== Badminton ==
Athlete	Event	Round of 64	Round of 32	Round of 16	Quarterfinal	Semifinal	Final / BM	
Athlete	Event	Opposition Score	Opposition Score	Opposition Score	Opposition Score	Opposition Score	Opposition Score	Rank
Hsieh Yu-hsing	Men's singles	Mehrabi (IRI); W 21–16, 21–12	Nguyen (VIE); W 21–16, 15–21, 21–15	Wong C H (MAS); W 14–21, 21–17, 21–18	Chen J (CHN); L 8–21, 4–21	Did not advance		
Cheng Shao-chieh	Women's singles	Bye	Xie Xf (CHN); L 1–21, 9–21	Did not advance				
Cheng Wen-hsing; Chien Yu-chin	Women's doubles	—		Edwards / Botts (RSA); W 21–6, 21–12	Zhang Yw / Wei Yl (CHN); L 14–21, 18–21	Did not advance		

== Baseball ==
Chinese Taipei finished third at the 2007 Asian Baseball Championship, forcing the team to seek Olympic qualification through the Final Qualifying Tournament. The team again finished third there, which was good enough to qualify for the Olympic tournament. Chinese Taipei made its third appearance in Olympic baseball in Beijing. The team's best result to date has been a silver medal in the inaugural tournament in 1992.

Manager: Hung I-Chung (洪一中 La New Bears).

Coaches: Hsieh Chang-Heng (謝長亨 Chinatrust Whales), Lu Ming-Tsu (呂明賜 La New Bears), Kung Jung-Tang (龔榮堂 National Training Team).

Pos.	No.	Player	Date of birth (age)	Bats	Throws	Club
P		Tsao Chin-Hui (曹錦輝)	June 2, 1981			MLB free agent
P		Yang Chien-Fu (陽建福)	April 22, 1979			(Taiwan) Sinon Bulls
P		Chen Wei-Yin (陳偉殷)	June 12, 1985			(Japan) Chunichi Dragons
P		Chang Chih-Chia (張誌家)	May 6, 1980			(Taiwan) La New Bears
P		Pan Wei-Lun (潘威倫)	March 5, 1982			(Taiwan) Uni-President Lions
P		Ni Fu-Te (倪福德)	November 14, 1982			(Taiwan) Chinatrust Whales
P		Hsu Wen-hsiung (許文雄)	December 5, 1978			(Taiwan) La New Bears
P		Lo Chia-Jen (羅嘉仁)	April 7, 1986			(Taiwan) Chinese Culture University
P		Cheng Kai-Wen (鄭凱文)	July 26, 1988			(Taiwan) Chinese Culture University
P		Lee Cheng-Chang (李振昌)	October 21, 1986			(Taiwan) Taipei Physical Education College
C		Yeh Chun-Chang (葉君璋)	October 25, 1972			(Taiwan) Sinon Bulls
C		Kao Chih-kang (高志綱)	February 7, 1981			(Taiwan) Uni-President Lions
C		Chen Feng-Min (陳峰民)	October 29, 1977			(Taiwan) La New Bears
IF		Chiang Chih-Hsien (蔣智賢)	February 21, 1988			(United States) Lancaster JetHawks (A+)
IF		Peng Cheng-Min (彭政閔)	August 6, 1978			(Taiwan) Brother Elephants
IF		Lin Chih-Sheng (林智勝)	January 1, 1982			(Taiwan) La New Bears
IF		Kuo Yen-Wen (郭嚴文)	October 25, 1988			(United States) Gulf Coast Reds
IF		Shih Chih-wei (石志偉)	August 4, 1977			(Taiwan) La New Bears
IF		Chang Tai-Shan (張泰山)	October 31, 1976			(Taiwan) Sinon Bulls
OF		Lo Kuo-Hui (羅國輝)	September 26, 1985			(United States) High Desert Mavericks (A+)
OF		Lin Che-Hsuan (林哲瑄)	September 21, 1988			(United States) Greenville Drive (A)
OF		Chen Chin-feng (陳金鋒)	October 28, 1977			(Taiwan) La New Bears
OF		Pan Wu-hsiung (潘武雄)	March 11, 1981			(Taiwan) Uni-President Lions
OF		Chang Chien-Ming (張建銘)	July 27, 1980			(Taiwan) Sinon Bulls

=== Results ===
Group stage All times are China Standard Time (UTC+8)

Team	1	2	3	4	5	6	7	8	9	R	H	E
Netherlands	0	0	0	0	0	0	0	0	0	0	4	1
Chinese Taipei	0	1	0	3	0	1	0	0	x	5	7	0

Team	1	2	3	4	5	6	7	8	9	R	H	E
Japan	0	0	0	0	1	1	0	0	4	6	6	1
Chinese Taipei	0	0	0	1	0	0	0	0	0	1	4	0

Team	1	2	3	4	5	6	7	8	9	10	11	12	R	H	E
Chinese Taipei	0	0	0	0	1	1	0	0	1	0	0	4	7	11	1
China	0	0	0	0	0	0	0	3	0	0	0	5	8	11	3

Team	1	2	3	4	5	6	7	8	9	R	H	E
Chinese Taipei	0	0	0	0	0	0	0	0	0	0	4	1
Cuba	0	0	0	0	0	0	1	0	x	1	5	0

Team	1	2	3	4	5	6	7	8	9	R	H	E
Chinese Taipei	0	2	0	0	4	2	0	0	0	8	12	2
South Korea	7	1	0	0	0	0	1	0	x	9	16	2

Team	1	2	3	4	5	6	7	8	9	R	H	E
United States	0	0	0	0	1	2	0	1	x	4	10	2
Chinese Taipei	0	0	0	0	1	0	1	0	0	2	5	0

Team	1	2	3	4	5	6	7	8	9	10	11	12	R	H	E
Canada	2	1	0	1	0	0	1	0	0	0	0	0	5	10	3
Chinese Taipei	1	4	0	0	0	0	0	0	0	0	0	1	6	10	2

Qualified for the semifinals
Eliminated

The top four teams will advance to the semifinal round.

Team	G	W	L	RS	RA	WIN%	GB	Tiebreaker
South Korea	7	7	0	41	22	1.000	-	-
Cuba	7	6	1	52	23	.857	1	-
United States	7	5	2	40	22	.714	2	-
Japan	7	4	3	30	14	.571	3	-
Chinese Taipei	7	2	5	29	33	.286	5	1-0
Canada	7	2	5	29	20	.286	5	0-1
Netherlands	7	1	6	9	50	.143	6	1-0
China	7	1	6	14	60	.143	6	0-1

Official Olympic Baseball Schedule

== Cycling ==
Chinese Taipei will compete in Olympic cycling after receiving a wild-card invitation from the Union Cycliste Internationale.

=== Track ===
Omnium

Athlete	Event	Points	Laps	Rank
Feng Chun-kai	Men's points race	Did not finish		

== Judo ==
Athlete	Event	Round of 32	Round of 16	Quarterfinals	Semifinals	Repechage 1	Repechage 2	Repechage 3	Final / BM	
Athlete	Event	Opposition Result	Opposition Result	Opposition Result	Opposition Result	Opposition Result	Opposition Result	Opposition Result	Opposition Result	Rank
Shih Pei-chun	Women's −52 kg	Bye	Kaliyeva (KAZ); L 0020–0021	Did not advance						
Wang Chin-fang	Women's −63 kg	Ylinen (FIN); W 1011–0000	Thapa (NEP); W 1000–0000	Gonzalez (CUB); L 0000–0010	Did not advance	Bye	Heill (AUT); L 0010–1010	Did not advance		

== Rowing ==
Men

Athlete	Event	Heats		Quarterfinals		Semifinals		Final	
Athlete	Event	Time	Rank	Time	Rank	Time	Rank	Time	Rank
Wang Ming-hui	Single sculls	7:46:83	4 QF	7:18:08	5 SC/D	7:23.75	5 FD	7:16.28	15

Qualification Legend: FA=Final A (medal); FB=Final B (non-medal); FC=Final C (non-medal); FD=Final D (non-medal); FE=Final E (non-medal); FF=Final F (non-medal); SA/B=Semifinals A/B; SC/D=Semifinals C/D; SE/F=Semifinals E/F; QF=Quarterfinals; R=Repechage

== Sailing ==
Men

Athlete	Event	Race											Net points	Final rank
Athlete	Event	1	2	3	4	5	6	7	8	9	10	M*	Net points	Final rank
Chang Hao	RS:X	31	29	31	28	28	20	34	~~DNF~~	24	35	EL	260	31

M = Medal race; EL = Eliminated – did not advance into the medal race; CAN = Race cancelled;

== Shooting ==
Women

Athlete	Event	Qualification		Final	
Athlete	Event	Points	Rank	Points	Rank
Huang Yi-ling	10 m air pistol	379	22	Did not advance	
Huang Yi-ling	25 m pistol	563	39	Did not advance	

== Softball ==
Chinese Taipei qualified for the eight-team Olympic softball tournament in Beijing by winning the Asian & Oceania Olympic Qualifying Tournament in February 2007.

=== Roster ===
- Chen Miao-Yi
- Chiang Hui-Chuan
- Chueh Ming-Hui
- Hsu Hsiu-Ling
- Huang Hui-Wen
- Lai Meng-Ting
- Lai Sheng-Jung
- Li Chiu-Ching
- Lin Su-Hua
- Lo Hsiao-Ting
- Lu Hsueh-Mei
- Pan Tzu-Hui
- Tung Yun-Chi
- Wen Li-Hsiu
- Wu Chia-Yen

=== Results ===
Qualified for the semifinals
Eliminated

The top four teams will advance to the semifinal round.

All times are China Standard Time (UTC+8)

Team	W	L	RS	RA	WIN%	GB	Tiebreaker
United States	7	0	53	1	1.000	-	-
Japan	6	1	23	13	.857	1	-
Australia	5	2	30	11	.714	2	-
Canada	3	4	17	23	.429	4	-
Chinese Taipei	2	5	10	23	.286	5	2-0 vs. CHN/VEN
China	2	5	19	21	.286	5	1-1 vs. TPE/VEN
Venezuela	2	5	15	35	.286	5	0-2 vs. CHN/TPE
Netherlands	1	6	8	48	.143	6	-

August 12

Team	1	2	3	4	5	6	7	R	H	E
Chinese Taipei	0	0	0	0	0	0	1	1	2	2
Canada	0	2	2	0	0	2	0	6	11	0
WP: Lauren Bay(1-0) LP: Chia-Yen Wu(0-1); Home runs: TPE: Chia-Ching Ll(1); CAN: None

August 13

Team	1	2	3	4	5	6	7	R	H	E
Japan	0	0	0	1	1	0	0	2	9	1
Chinese Taipei	0	0	0	0	0	0	1	1	6	1
WP: Hiroko Sakai(1-0) LP: Sheng-Jung Lai(0-1); Home runs: JPN: Satoko Mabuchi(2); TPE: None

August 14

Team	1	2	3	4	5	6	7	R	H	E
Chinese Taipei	2	0	0	1	0	0	X	3	6	0
Venezuela	0	0	0	0	0	0	0	0	3	2
WP: Chia-Yen Wu(1-1) LP: Johana Gómez(0-2); Home runs: TPE: Hsueh-Mei Lu(1); VEN: None

August 15

Team	1	2	3	4	5	6	7	R	H	E
Australia	0	0	0	0	2	1	0	3	5	0
Chinese Taipei	1	0	0	0	0	0	0	1	5	0
WP: Kelly Hardie(1-0) LP: Sheng-Jung Lai(0-2); Home runs: AUS: Natalie Ward(1), Natalie Titcume(2); TPE: None

August 16

Team	1	2	3	4	5	6	7	R	H	E
United States	1	0	5	1	X	X	X	7	10	0
Chinese Taipei	0	0	0	0	0	X	X	0	2	1
WP: Jennie Finch(2-0) LP: Su-Hua Lin(0-1); Home runs: USA: Jessica Mendoza(3); TPE: None

August 17

Team	1	2	3	4	5	6	7	R	H	E
Chinese Taipei	1	0	0	1	0	0	0	2	6	1
China	0	1	0	0	0	0	0	1	5	1
WP: Ming-Hui Chueh(1-0) LP: Huili Yu(1-2)

== Swimming ==
Men

Athlete	Event	Heat		Semifinal		Final	
Athlete	Event	Time	Rank	Time	Rank	Time	Rank
Hsu Chi-chieh	200 m butterfly	1:56.59	15 Q	1:57.48	16	Did not advance	
Wang Wei-wen	200 m breaststroke	2:17.20	49	Did not advance			

Women

Athlete	Event	Heat		Semifinal		Final	
Athlete	Event	Time	Rank	Time	Rank	Time	Rank
Lin Man-hsu	200 m individual medley	2:23.29	36	Did not advance			
Nieh Pin-chieh	100 m freestyle	57.28	43	Did not advance			
Yang Chin-kuei	200 m freestyle	2:02.84	37	Did not advance			
Yang Chin-kuei	400 m freestyle	4:24.78	40	—		Did not advance	
Yang Chin-kuei	100 m butterfly	1:01.60	43	Did not advance			
Yang Chin-kuei	200 m butterfly	1:13.26	27	Did not advance			

== Table tennis ==
Chinese Taipei qualified two men and two women in singles competition in addition to the men's team competition and will be sending a total of five athletes to compete in table tennis.

Singles

Athlete	Event	Preliminary round	Round 1	Round 2	Round 3	Round 4	Quarterfinals	Semifinals	Final / BM	
Athlete	Event	Opposition Result	Opposition Result	Opposition Result	Opposition Result	Opposition Result	Opposition Result	Opposition Result	Opposition Result	Rank
Chiang Peng-lung	Men's singles	Bye		Kim H-B (PRK); L 2–4	Did not advance					
Chuang Chih-yuan	Men's singles	Bye			Yang Z (SIN); L 3–4	Did not advance				
Huang I-hua	Women's singles	Bye	Bakula (CRO); W 4–1	Ni Xl (LUX); L 1-4	Did not advance					
Pan Li-chun	Women's singles	Abdul-Aziz (EGY); W 4–0	Hu (TUR); L 1–4	Did not advance						

Team

Athlete	Event	Group round		Semifinals	Bronze playoff 1	Bronze playoff 2	Bronze medal	Final	
Athlete	Event	Opposition Result	Rank	Opposition Result	Opposition Result	Opposition Result	Opposition Result	Opposition Result	Rank
Chang Yen-shu; Chiang Peng-lung; Chuang Chih-yuan	Men's team	Group C South Korea; L 1 – 3 Sweden; W 3 – 2 Brazil; W 3 – 1	2	Did not advance	Hong Kong; L 0 – 3	Did not advance			

== Taekwondo ==
Athlete	Event	Round of 16	Quarterfinals	Semifinals	Repechage	Bronze medal	Final	
Athlete	Event	Opposition Result	Opposition Result	Opposition Result	Opposition Result	Opposition Result	Opposition Result	Rank
Chu Mu-yen	Men's −58 kg	Wamwiri (KEN); W 8–0	Mercedes (DOM); L 2–3	Did not advance	Póvoa (POR); W 1–0	Khawlaor (THA); W 4–3	Did not advance	3rd place, bronze medalist(s)
Sung Yu-chi	Men's −68 kg	Campbell (NZL); W 4–0	Kim (UZB); W 3–2	Son T-J (KOR); L 6–7	Bye	Manz (GER); W 4–3	Did not advance	3rd place, bronze medalist(s)
Yang Shu-chun	Women's −49 kg	Mora (COL); W 0–(−1)	Khoshjamal (IRI); W 3–2	Wu Jy (CHN); L 1–4	Bye	Montejo (CUB); L 2–3	Did not advance	5
Su Li-wen	Women's −57 kg	Lim S-J (KOR); L 0–1	Did not advance		Cheong (NZL); W 1–0	Zubčić (CRO); L 4–5	Did not advance	5

== Tennis ==
Athlete	Event	Round of 64	Round of 32	Round of 16	Quarterfinals	Semifinals	Final / BM	
Athlete	Event	Opposition Score	Opposition Score	Opposition Score	Opposition Score	Opposition Score	Opposition Score	Rank
Lu Yen-hsun	Men's singles	Murray (GBR); W 7–6^{(7–5)}, 6–4	Calleri (ARG); W 6–4, 6–4	Melzer (AUT); L 2–6, 4–6	Did not advance			
Chan Yung-jan	Women's singles	Radwańska (POL); L 1–6, 6–7^{(6–8)}	Did not advance					
Chan Yung-jan; Chuang Chia-jung	Women's doubles	—	Cornet / Razzano (FRA); W 7–6^{(7–2)}, 6–7^{(3–7)}, 7–5	Pennetta / Schiavone (ITA); L 6–7^{(1–7)}, 6–1, 6–8	Did not advance			

== Weightlifting ==
Five weightlifters from Chinese Taipei will compete in Beijing.

Athlete	Event	Snatch		Clean & jerk		Total	Rank
Athlete	Event	Result	Rank	Result	Rank	Total	Rank
Wang Shin-yuan	Men's −56 kg	115	11	150	7	265	7
Yang Chin-yi	Men's −56 kg	128	=4	157	4	285	4
Yang Sheng-hsiung	Men's −62 kg	130	=9	157	9	287	9
Chen Wei-ling	Women's −48 kg	84	5	112	3	196	1st place, gold medalist(s)
Lu Ying-chi	Women's −63 kg	104	3	127	3	231	2nd place, silver medalist(s)

== See also ==
- Chinese Taipei at the 2008 Summer Paralympics
