= Softball at the 1998 Asian Games =

- Venue: Srinakharinwirot University; Thammasat Stadium
- Dates: 7–16 December 1998
- Nations: 7

Softball was contested by seven teams at the 1998 Asian Games in Bangkok, Thailand from December 7 to December 16.

== Schedule ==
P	Preliminary round	½	Semifinals	F	Final	G	Grand final

Event↓/Date →	7th Mon	8th Tue	9th Wed	10th Thu	11th Fri	12th Sat	13th Sun	14th Mon	15th Tue	16th Wed	
Women	P	P	P	P	P	P	P	½		F	G

== Medalists ==
Event	Gold	Silver	Bronze
Women	China; An Zhongxin; Chen Hong; Deng Xiaoling; Mu Xia; Qin Xuejing; Tao Hua; Wang Lihong; Wang Xiaoyan; Wang Ying; Wei Qiang; Xu Jian; Yan Fang; Yu Yanhong; Zhang Chunfang; Zhang Yanqing	Japan; Misako Ando; Yumiko Fujii; Noriko Harada; Taeko Ishikawa; Kumiko Ito; Yoshimi Kobayashi; Shiori Koseki; Naomi Matsumoto; Tomoe Matsumoto; Haruka Saito; Juri Takayama; Reika Utsugi; Miyo Yamada; Noriko Yamaji; Miwa Tanoue	Chinese Taipei; Chiang Hui-chuan; Chien Chen-ju; Feng Wei-ning; Han Hsin-lin; Hsieh Yu-ping; Hsu Yu-ling; Lai Sheng-jung; Lee Ming-chieh; Lee Szu-ting; Liu Chia-chi; Ou Ching-chieh; Tu Hui-mei; Tu Hui-ping; Wang Ching-lien; Wang Ya-fen

== Results ==
=== Round robin ===
Pos	Team	Pld	W	L	RF	RA	PCT	GB	Qualification
1	China	6	6	0	47	2	1.000	—	Semifinals
2	Japan	6	5	1	43	8	.833	1	Semifinals
3	North Korea	6	3	3	17	15	.500 (Note: Head-to-head result: PRK 3–2 TPE.)	3	Semifinals
4	Chinese Taipei	6	3	3	28	15	.500	3	Semifinals
5	South Korea	6	2	4	9	20	.333 (Note: Head-to-head result: KOR 3–0 PHI.)	4	
6	Philippines	6	2	4	11	35	.333	4	
7	Thailand	6	0	6	2	62	.000	6	

Source: Results
Notes:

7 December	North Korea	3–0	South Korea	Bangkok

7 December	Philippines	2–10	Japan	Bangkok

7 December	Thailand	1–16	China	Bangkok

8 December	Chinese Taipei	11–0	Philippines	Bangkok

8 December	China	2–0	North Korea	Bangkok

8 December	South Korea	0–3	Japan	Bangkok

9 December	Chinese Taipei	11–0	Thailand	Bangkok

9 December	China	3–1	Japan	Bangkok

9 December	Philippines	3–1	North Korea	Bangkok

10 December	Philippines	0–10	China	Bangkok

10 December	Chinese Taipei	2–3	North Korea	Bangkok

10 December	South Korea	6–1	Thailand	Bangkok

11 December	South Korea	0–12	China	Bangkok

11 December	North Korea	10–0	Thailand	Bangkok

11 December	Chinese Taipei	3–8	Japan	Bangkok

12 December	Thailand	0–13	Japan	Bangkok

12 December	Philippines	0–3	South Korea	Bangkok

12 December	Chinese Taipei	0–4	China	Bangkok

13 December	Philippines	6–0	Thailand	Bangkok

13 December	South Korea	0–1	Chinese Taipei	Bangkok

13 December	Japan	8–0	North Korea	Bangkok

=== Final round ===
Semifinals
1	China	2
2	Japan	1
3	North Korea	1
4	Chinese Taipei	4

Final
2	Japan	8
4	Chinese Taipei	0

Grand final
1	China	5
2	Japan	0

==== Semifinals ====
14 December	China	2–1	Japan	Bangkok

14 December	North Korea	1–4	Chinese Taipei	Bangkok

==== Final ====
16 December	Japan	8–0	Chinese Taipei	Bangkok

==== Grand final ====
16 December	China	5–0	Japan	Bangkok

== Final standing ==
Rank	Team	Pld	W	L
1st place, gold medalist(s)	China	8	8	0
2nd place, silver medalist(s)	Japan	9	6	3
3rd place, bronze medalist(s)	Chinese Taipei	8	4	4
4	North Korea	7	3	4
5	South Korea	6	2	4
6	Philippines	6	2	4
7	Thailand	6	0	6
