= Chinese Taipei at the 1994 Asian Games =

Chinese Taipei at the Asian Games
- IOC code: TPE
- NOC: Chinese Taipei Olympic Committee
- Medals: Gold 7 Silver 13 Bronze 24 Total 44

Summer appearances
- 1954; 1958; 1962; 1966; 1970; 1974–1986; 1990; 1994; 1998; 2002; 2006; 2010; 2014; 2018; 2022; 2026

Winter appearances
- 1990; 1996; 1999; 2003; 2007; 2011; 2017; 2025; 2029

Chinese Taipei competed at the 1994 Asian Games in Hiroshima, Japan. This was their 6th appearance in the Asian Games. They won at total of 7 gold, 13 silver, and 24 bronze medals, or 44 medals in total. They improved from the previous Asian Games in 1990, where they won a total of 31 medals. They won the most medals in Judo, where they got a total of 1 silver and 5 bronze.

It was their 6th best performance of all time in the Asian Games, and their best performance before 1998. After their performance in 1994, they started gradually improving, getting a record total of 77 medals at the 1998 Asian Games. They were ranked 7th out of the 42 nations that competed in the Asian Games, falling behind China, Japan, South Korea, Kazakhstan, Uzbekistan, and Iran.

== Athletes with medals ==
Wu Tsung-yi
Wang Huei-chen
Hsu Pei-ching
Ma Chun-ping
Chen Chun-hung
Chen Kai-fa
Ho Chih-fan
Hsieh Fu-guey
Hsu Sheng-chieh
Huang Ching-ching
Huang Hsin-fu
Huang Kan-lin
Huang Kuei-yu
Hung Chi-feng
Kao Chien-san
Liang Ju-hao
Lin Hung-yuan
Lin Sheng-hsiung
Lin Yueh-liang
Liu Chih-sheng
Wu Chun-liang
Wu Wen-yu
Yang Fu-chun
Yeh Chun-chang
Lin Han-chen
Chen Ling-i
Weng Feng-ying
Chiu Shu-mei
Yang Lin-hua
Chou Miao-lin
Yang Hsiu-chen
Lan Chung-hsiung
Chen Hsiang-fu
Kang Yu
Chen Hui-ming
Huang Han-wen
Chou Min-kun
Su Cheng-hung
Chinese Taipei National Football team
Huang Yu-chen Chan Chin-sha Lee Jui-hui Lo Yu-wei Yeh Wen-hua Huang Yu-hsin Tseng Hsiao-fen Wu Mei-ling Chen Chiu-ping Su Su-chen Chen Shu-chen Liu Ya-chen Liao Yun-chih Lin Chia-hui
Huang Shu-mei
Lin Ya-ting
Chuang Yen-chun Chang Hsiao-ching
Chang Mei-lan
Cheng I-wen
Chien Chen-ju
Chiu Chen-ting
Chung Chiung-yao
Feng Shu-fang
Han Hsin-lin
Hsu Chun-hua
Lee Ming-chieh
Liu Chia-chi
Shih Mei-ling
Shih Mei-yun
Tu Hui-ping
Wang Ya-fen
Yang Hui-chun
Yen Show-tzu Chiang Peng-lung
Xu Jing Wu Wen-chia
Chen Jing Chang Jung-san Chang Jung-san Jane Chi
Ho Chiu-mei
Wang Shi-ting
Weng Tzu-ting Liao Hsing-chou Kuo Shu-fen Lin Ya-ching Chen Shu-chih Chen Hsiao-lien
