= Softball at the 1990 Asian Games =

- Venue: Fengtai Softball Field
- Dates: 23–28 September 1990
- Nations: 5

Softball was contested by five teams in a round robin competition at the 1990 Asian Games in Beijing, China from September 23 to September 28, 1990.

China won the gold medal in a round robin competition.

== Medalists ==
Event	Gold	Silver	Bronze
Women	China; An Zhongxin; Chen Tian; Fang Xiufen; He Jing; Huang Yonghong; Liu Juan; Liu Xuqing; Lu Min; Ou Jingbai; Wang Lihong; Wang Xiaoyan; Wang Ying; Wei Jialian; Yan Fang; Yu Jie; Xie Yingmei; Zhang Chunfang	Japan; Hiromi Ando; Yoshie Fujinawa; Masumi Ichiba; Kyoko Kagawa; Nami Kikuchi; Kaori Kishioka; Yoshimi Kobayashi; Noriko Kurihara; Naomi Matsumoto; Yumiko Miyauchi; Masayo Miyazaki; Mari Nakata; Keiko Noda; Izumi Noki; Kanako Okuni; Akemi Teranishi; Yoko Toyoda	Chinese Taipei; Chang Hsiao-ching; Chen Hui-ching; Chou Yu-ling; Chung Chiung-yao; Han Hsin-lin; Hsu Chun-hua; Hsu Hsiu-jung; Lai Jung-mei; Lee Mei; Liu Yun-hsiu; Su Yu-chun; Tsai Yu-chun; Tu Hui-ping; Wang Ya-fen; Yang Hui-chun; Yeh Mei-hsiu; Yen Show-tzu

== Results ==
Pos	Team	Pld	W	L	RF	RA	PCT	GB
1	China	8	7	1	58	4	.875	—
2	Japan	8	6	2	44	20	.750	1
3	Chinese Taipei	8	5	3	48	16	.625	2
4	South Korea	8	2	6	7	47	.250	5
5	North Korea	8	0	8	1	71	.000	7

Source: Results

23 September	North Korea	0–1	South Korea	Fengtai Softball Field, Beijing

23 September	China	0–2	Chinese Taipei	Fengtai Softball Field, Beijing

23 September	Japan	9–1	North Korea	Fengtai Softball Field, Beijing

23 September	South Korea	0–10	China	Fengtai Softball Field, Beijing

24 September	Japan	4–3	Chinese Taipei	Fengtai Softball Field, Beijing

24 September	North Korea	0–10	China	Fengtai Softball Field, Beijing

24 September	Chinese Taipei	4–0	South Korea	Fengtai Softball Field, Beijing

24 September	Japan	0–7	China	Fengtai Softball Field, Beijing

25 September	Chinese Taipei	17–0	North Korea	Fengtai Softball Field, Beijing

25 September	Japan	5–2	South Korea	Fengtai Softball Field, Beijing

26 September	North Korea	0–10	Chinese Taipei	Fengtai Softball Field, Beijing

26 September	Japan	9–0	South Korea	Fengtai Softball Field, Beijing

26 September	China	15–0	North Korea	Fengtai Softball Field, Beijing

26 September	Chinese Taipei	5–10 (F/8)	Japan	Fengtai Softball Field, Beijing

27 September	South Korea	2–12	China	Fengtai Softball Field, Beijing

27 September	Japan	7–0	North Korea	Fengtai Softball Field, Beijing

27 September	Chinese Taipei	7–0	South Korea	Fengtai Softball Field, Beijing

27 September	China	2–0	Japan	Fengtai Softball Field, Beijing

28 September	South Korea	2–0	North Korea	Fengtai Softball Field, Beijing

28 September	China	2–0	Chinese Taipei	Fengtai Softball Field, Beijing

== Final standing ==
Rank	Team	Pld	W	L
1st place, gold medalist(s)	China	8	7	1
2nd place, silver medalist(s)	Japan	8	6	2
3rd place, bronze medalist(s)	Chinese Taipei	8	5	3
4	South Korea	8	2	6
5	North Korea	8	0	8
