= Softball at the 2014 Asian Games =

- Venue: Songdo LNG Baseball Stadium
- Dates: 27 September – 2 October 2014
- Competitors: 90 from 6 nations

Softball at the 2014 Asian Games was held at Songdo LNG Baseball Stadium, Incheon, South Korea from 27 September to 2 October 2014.

== Schedule ==
P	Preliminary round	½	Semifinals	F	Final	G	Grand final

Event↓/Date →	27th Sat	28th Sun	29th Mon	30th Tue	1st Wed	2nd Thu	
Women	P	P	P	P	½	F	G

== Medalists ==
Event	Gold	Silver	Bronze
Women	Japan; Nozomi Nagasaki; Yukiyo Mine; Rei Nishiyama; Yuka Ichiguchi; Yu Yamamoto; Haruna Sakamoto; Rie Nagayoshi; Misato Kawano; Misa Okubo; Eri Yamada; Yamato Fujita; Yukiko Ueno; Kana Nakano; Sayuri Yamane; Minami Sato	Chinese Taipei; Lin Su-hua; Lin Ying-hsin; Shih Ching-ping; Li Szu-shih; Chung Hui-lin; Lai Meng-ting; Huang Hui-wen; Wang Hsiang-yun; Chen Miao-yi; Chiang Hui-chuan; Liu Yu-han; Lin Pei-chun; Chiu An-ju; Yang Yi-ting; Lu Hsueh-mei	China; Li Na; Li Qi; Sun Xue; Lu Ying; Feng Qianwen; Wei Dongmei; Jin Lingling; Chen Jia; Liu Yining; Guo Ruomeng; Yuan Jingjing; Zha Dan; Guo Jia; Wang Lan; Li Huan

== Squads ==
Squads

China	Chinese Taipei	Japan	Philippines
Li Na; Li Qi; Sun Xue; Lu Ying; Feng Qianwen; Wei Dongmei; Jin Lingling; Chen Jia; Liu Yining; Guo Ruomeng; Yuan Jingjing; Zha Dan; Guo Jia; Wang Lan; Li Huan	Lin Su-hua; Lin Ying-hsin; Shih Ching-ping; Li Szu-shih; Chung Hui-lin; Lai Meng-ting; Huang Hui-wen; Wang Hsiang-yun; Chen Miao-yi; Chiang Hui-chuan; Liu Yu-han; Lin Pei-chun; Chiu An-ju; Yang Yi-ting; Lu Hsueh-mei	Nozomi Nagasaki; Yukiyo Mine; Rei Nishiyama; Yuka Ichiguchi; Yu Yamamoto; Haruna Sakamoto; Rie Nagayoshi; Misato Kawano; Misa Okubo; Eri Yamada; Yamato Fujita; Yukiko Ueno; Kana Nakano; Sayuri Yamane; Minami Sato	Veronica Belleza; Annalie Benjamen; Marlyn Francisco; Angelie Ursabia; Cheska Altomonte; Garie Blando; Francesca Foti; Lorna Adorable; Leia Ruiz; Luzviminda Embudo; Dani Gilmore; Gabrielle Rodas; Morgan Stuart; Rizza Bernardino; Elma Parohinog
South Korea	Thailand		
Lim Mi-ran; Jung Ha-na; Park Joo-hyun; Suk Eun-jung; Shin Su-jeong; Jeong Yoon-young; Yang Lee-sel; Kim Min-young; Park Hyeon-sa; Noh Keum-ran; Lim Kyeong-eun; Bae Yu-ka; Park Su-youn; Choi Sun-hwa; Sim Mi-hyeong	Thanapan Saisud; Pinit Leeudom; Waraporn Konyuen; Nareerat Sutta; Ancheera Sirimaha; Phasinee Mantalampha; Kantrakorn Jitisaree; Paweena Sangkong; Waranya Buaphan; Atcharaphan Sisuk; Parima Phandakiri; Suwanan Singhaampon; Nitchanan Suansara; Tassaneewan Kwaopanya; Kanjanaporn Klomklom		

== Results ==
All times are Korea Standard Time (UTC+09:00)

=== Preliminary round ===
Pos	Team	Pld	W	L	RF	RA	PCT	GB	Qualification
1	Japan	5	5	0	39	3	1.000	—	Semifinals
2	Chinese Taipei	5	4	1	21	11	.800	1	Semifinals
3	China	5	3	2	19	10	.600	2	Semifinals
4	Philippines	5	2	3	24	24	.400	3	Semifinals
5	South Korea	5	1	4	8	18	.200	4	
6	Thailand	5	0	5	2	47	.000	5	

Source: Official website

27 September; 9:00	Japan	10–0 (F/4)	Thailand	Songdo LNG Baseball Stadium, Incheon; Attendance: 100; Umpires: Hwang Jeng-sup (KOR)
27 September; 9:00	WP: Yamato Fujita		LP: Parima Phandakiri	Songdo LNG Baseball Stadium, Incheon; Attendance: 100; Umpires: Hwang Jeng-sup (KOR)

Team	1	2	3	4	5	6	7	R	H	E
Thailand	0	0	0	0	—	—	—	0	3	3
Japan	2	2	6	X	—	—	—	10	12	0

27 September; 11:30	Philippines	3–1	South Korea	Songdo LNG Baseball Stadium, Incheon; Attendance: 200; Umpires: Chen Tsung-ho (TPE)
27 September; 11:30	WP: Veronica Belleza		LP: Lim Mi-ran	Songdo LNG Baseball Stadium, Incheon; Attendance: 200; Umpires: Chen Tsung-ho (TPE)

Team	1	2	3	4	5	6	7	R	H	E
South Korea	0	0	0	0	1	0	0	1	6	1
Philippines	2	0	0	0	1	0	0	3	9	0

27 September; 14:00	China	0–2	Chinese Taipei	Songdo LNG Baseball Stadium, Incheon; Attendance: 150; Umpires: Nobuhiro Endo (JPN)
27 September; 14:00	LP: Wang Lan		WP: Lin Su-hua	Songdo LNG Baseball Stadium, Incheon; Attendance: 150; Umpires: Nobuhiro Endo (JPN)

Team	1	2	3	4	5	6	7	R	H	E
Chinese Taipei	0	0	0	0	0	2	0	2	4	0
China	0	0	0	0	0	0	0	0	4	1

27 September; 16:30	Philippines	2–10 (F/5)	Japan	Songdo LNG Baseball Stadium, Incheon; Attendance: 250; Umpires: Nor Hajar Abd Hamid (MAS)
27 September; 16:30	LP: Rizza Bernardino		WP: Sayuri Yamane	Songdo LNG Baseball Stadium, Incheon; Attendance: 250; Umpires: Nor Hajar Abd Hamid (MAS)

Team	1	2	3	4	5	6	7	R	H	E
Japan	6	0	2	4	0	—	—	10	11	0
Philippines	0	0	2	0	0	—	—	2	3	3

28 September; 9:00	Thailand	0–7 (F/6)	South Korea	Songdo LNG Baseball Stadium, Incheon; Attendance: 145; Umpires: Wang Show-ling (TPE)
28 September; 9:00	LP: Phasinee Mantalampha		WP: Park Su-youn	Songdo LNG Baseball Stadium, Incheon; Attendance: 145; Umpires: Wang Show-ling (TPE)

Team	1	2	3	4	5	6	7	R	H	E
South Korea	2	0	1	0	0	4	—	7	9	0
Thailand	0	0	0	0	0	0	—	0	3	1

28 September; 11:30	China	8–2	Philippines	Songdo LNG Baseball Stadium, Incheon; Attendance: 260; Umpires: Kittisak Narungsri (THA)
28 September; 11:30	WP: Wang Lan		LP: Veronica Belleza	Songdo LNG Baseball Stadium, Incheon; Attendance: 260; Umpires: Kittisak Narungsri (THA)
28 September; 11:30	HR: Wei Dongmei (1)			Songdo LNG Baseball Stadium, Incheon; Attendance: 260; Umpires: Kittisak Narungsri (THA)

Team	1	2	3	4	5	6	7	R	H	E
Philippines	0	2	0	0	0	0	0	2	4	1
China	1	4	0	2	0	1	X	8	9	0

28 September; 14:00	Japan	7–0 (F/6)	Chinese Taipei	Songdo LNG Baseball Stadium, Incheon; Attendance: 223; Umpires: Xing Lisha (CHN)
28 September; 14:00	WP: Yukiko Ueno		LP: Chung Hui-lin	Songdo LNG Baseball Stadium, Incheon; Attendance: 223; Umpires: Xing Lisha (CHN)

Team	1	2	3	4	5	6	7	R	H	E
Chinese Taipei	0	0	0	0	0	0	—	0	3	0
Japan	0	0	0	2	2	3	—	7	10	0

28 September; 16:30	China	1–0	South Korea	Songdo LNG Baseball Stadium, Incheon; Attendance: 250; Umpires: Harutoshi Kitayama (JPN)
28 September; 16:30	WP: Li Qi		LP: Bae Yu-ka	Songdo LNG Baseball Stadium, Incheon; Attendance: 250; Umpires: Harutoshi Kitayama (JPN)

Team	1	2	3	4	5	6	7	R	H	E
South Korea	0	0	0	0	0	0	0	0	1	0
China	0	0	0	1	0	0	X	1	2	0

29 September; 10:15	Chinese Taipei	5–4	Philippines	Songdo LNG Baseball Stadium, Incheon; Attendance: 78; Umpires: Pattama Piamjit (THA)
29 September; 10:15	WP: Chung Hui-lin		LP: Francesca Foti	Songdo LNG Baseball Stadium, Incheon; Attendance: 78; Umpires: Pattama Piamjit (THA)
29 September; 10:15	HR: Lu Hsueh-mei (1), Li Szu-shih (1)			Songdo LNG Baseball Stadium, Incheon; Attendance: 78; Umpires: Pattama Piamjit (THA)

Team	1	2	3	4	5	6	7	R	H	E
Philippines	1	0	0	0	3	0	0	4	7	0
Chinese Taipei	1	1	1	2	0	0	X	5	10	0

29 September; 12:00	China	9–2 (F/5)	Thailand	Songdo LNG Baseball Stadium, Incheon; Attendance: 260; Umpires: Nor Hajar Abd Hamid (MAS)
29 September; 12:00	WP: Jin Lingling		LP: Parima Phandakiri	Songdo LNG Baseball Stadium, Incheon; Attendance: 260; Umpires: Nor Hajar Abd Hamid (MAS)

Team	1	2	3	4	5	6	7	R	H	E
Thailand	0	0	2	0	0	—	—	2	3	2
China	3	1	0	0	5	—	—	9	7	1

29 September; 14:00	South Korea	0–8	Japan	Songdo LNG Baseball Stadium, Incheon; Attendance: 121; Umpires: Jia Leiming (CHN)
29 September; 14:00	LP: Park Su-youn		WP: Sayuri Yamane	Songdo LNG Baseball Stadium, Incheon; Attendance: 121; Umpires: Jia Leiming (CHN)
29 September; 14:00			HR: Haruna Sakamoto (1)	Songdo LNG Baseball Stadium, Incheon; Attendance: 121; Umpires: Jia Leiming (CHN)

Team	1	2	3	4	5	6	7	R	H	E
Japan	0	2	0	3	0	0	3	8	12	0
South Korea	0	0	0	0	0	0	0	0	2	1

29 September; 16:30	Chinese Taipei	8–0 (F/5)	Thailand	Songdo LNG Baseball Stadium, Incheon; Attendance: 140; Umpires: Lo Wing Yan (HKG)
29 September; 16:30	WP: Chiu An-ju		LP: Waranya Buaphan	Songdo LNG Baseball Stadium, Incheon; Attendance: 140; Umpires: Lo Wing Yan (HKG)

Team	1	2	3	4	5	6	7	R	H	E
Thailand	0	0	0	0	0	—	—	0	2	0
Chinese Taipei	3	0	1	4	X	—	—	8	11	0

30 September; 9:00	Japan	4–1	China	Songdo LNG Baseball Stadium, Incheon; Attendance: 134; Umpires: Hwang Jeng-sup (KOR)
30 September; 9:00	WP: Kana Nakano		LP: Wang Lan	Songdo LNG Baseball Stadium, Incheon; Attendance: 134; Umpires: Hwang Jeng-sup (KOR)

Team	1	2	3	4	5	6	7	R	H	E
China	0	0	0	0	0	1	0	1	8	0
Japan	1	0	2	1	0	0	X	4	8	1

30 September; 11:30	South Korea	0–6	Chinese Taipei	Songdo LNG Baseball Stadium, Incheon; Attendance: 200; Umpires: Harutoshi Kitayama (JPN)
30 September; 11:30	LP: Bae Yu-ka		WP: Chiu An-ju	Songdo LNG Baseball Stadium, Incheon; Attendance: 200; Umpires: Harutoshi Kitayama (JPN)

Team	1	2	3	4	5	6	7	R	H	E
Chinese Taipei	1	0	0	0	0	0	5	6	11	0
South Korea	0	0	0	0	0	0	0	0	2	1

30 September; 14:00	Philippines	13–0 (F/4)	Thailand	Songdo LNG Baseball Stadium, Incheon; Attendance: 96; Umpires: Ryu Duck-hyun (KOR)
30 September; 14:00	WP: Veronica Belleza		LP: Phasinee Mantalampha	Songdo LNG Baseball Stadium, Incheon; Attendance: 96; Umpires: Ryu Duck-hyun (KOR)

Team	1	2	3	4	5	6	7	R	H	E
Thailand	0	0	0	0	—	—	—	0	2	1
Philippines	0	7	6	X	—	—	—	13	15	0

=== Final round ===
Semifinals
1	Japan	6
2	Chinese Taipei	1
3	China	3
4	Philippines	0

Final
2	Chinese Taipei	4
3	China	3

Grand final
1	Japan	6
2	Chinese Taipei	0

==== Semifinals ====
1 October; 10:00	Chinese Taipei	1–6	Japan	Songdo LNG Baseball Stadium, Incheon; Attendance: 98; Umpires: Nor Hajar Abd Hamid (MAS)
1 October; 10:00	LP: Lin Ying-hsin		WP: Yukiko Ueno	Songdo LNG Baseball Stadium, Incheon; Attendance: 98; Umpires: Nor Hajar Abd Hamid (MAS)
1 October; 10:00			HR: Yu Yamamoto (1)	Songdo LNG Baseball Stadium, Incheon; Attendance: 98; Umpires: Nor Hajar Abd Hamid (MAS)

Team	1	2	3	4	5	6	7	R	H	E
Japan	1	1	2	0	1	1	0	6	13	1
Chinese Taipei	0	0	0	0	0	0	1	1	5	0

1 October; 14:30	Philippines	0–3	China	Songdo LNG Baseball Stadium, Incheon; Attendance: 67; Umpires: Nobuhiro Endo (JPN)
1 October; 14:30	LP: Veronica Belleza		WP: Wang Lan	Songdo LNG Baseball Stadium, Incheon; Attendance: 67; Umpires: Nobuhiro Endo (JPN)

Team	1	2	3	4	5	6	7	R	H	E
China	0	2	0	0	0	1	0	3	5	1
Philippines	0	0	0	0	0	0	0	0	3	2

==== Final ====
2 October; 9:30	China	3–4	Chinese Taipei	Songdo LNG Baseball Stadium, Incheon; Attendance: 98; Umpires: Kittisak Narungsri (THA)
2 October; 9:30	LP: Li Qi		WP: Lin Su-hua	Songdo LNG Baseball Stadium, Incheon; Attendance: 98; Umpires: Kittisak Narungsri (THA)
2 October; 9:30			HR: Li Szu-shih (1)	Songdo LNG Baseball Stadium, Incheon; Attendance: 98; Umpires: Kittisak Narungsri (THA)

Team	1	2	3	4	5	6	7	R	H	E
Chinese Taipei	2	0	0	0	0	2	0	4	4	1
China	2	0	0	0	0	1	0	3	4	2

==== Grand final ====
2 October; 14:30	Japan	6–0	Chinese Taipei	Songdo LNG Baseball Stadium, Incheon; Attendance: 560; Umpires: Xing Lisha (CHN)
2 October; 14:30	WP: Yukiko Ueno		LP: Chung Hui-lin	Songdo LNG Baseball Stadium, Incheon; Attendance: 560; Umpires: Xing Lisha (CHN)

Team	1	2	3	4	5	6	7	R	H	E
Chinese Taipei	0	0	0	0	0	0	0	0	3	0
Japan	0	1	3	0	0	2	X	6	9	1

== Final standing ==
Rank	Team	Pld	W	L
1st place, gold medalist(s)	Japan	7	7	0
2nd place, silver medalist(s)	Chinese Taipei	8	5	3
3rd place, bronze medalist(s)	China	7	4	3
4	Philippines	6	2	4
5	South Korea	5	1	4
6	Thailand	5	0	5
