= Li Lei =

Li Lei or Lei Li may refer to:

- Lei Li (softball) (雷雳, born 1968), Chinese softball player and Olympic medallist
- Li Lei (javelin thrower) (李蕾, born 1974), Chinese javelin thrower
- Lei Li (weightlifter) (born 1975), Chinese weightlifter
- Li Lei (baseball) (李磊, born 1984), Chinese baseball player
- Li Lei (race walker) (born 1987), Chinese race walker
- Li Lei (skier) (李雷, born 1987), Chinese alpine skier
- Li Lei (sitting volleyball) (born 1991), Chinese beach volleyball player
- Li Lei (footballer) (李磊), Chinese football player
- Li Lei (beach volleyball), Chinese beach volleyball player
