= Ma Ying (softball) =

Chinese softball player

Personal information
- Born: April 10, 1972 (age 54) Qiqihar, Heilongjiang
- Height: 176 cm (5 ft 9 in)
Medal record
Women's softball
Representing China
Olympic Games
Silver medal – second place	1996 Atlanta	Team
Asian Games
Gold medal – first place	1994 Hiroshima	Team

Ma Ying (simplified Chinese: 马英; traditional Chinese: 馬英; pinyin: Mǎ Yīng; born April 10, 1972) is a female Chinese softball player who competed in the 1996 Summer Olympics.

In 1996, she won a silver medal as part of the Chinese national team and played as a pitcher in two matches.
