= Xu Jian (softball) =

Chinese softball player

Personal information
- Born: July 27, 1970 (age 56)
- Height: 178 cm (5 ft 10 in)
Medal record
Women's softball
Representing China
Olympic Games
Silver medal – second place	1996 Atlanta	Team
Asian Games
Gold medal – first place	1998 Bangkok	Team

Xu Jian (Chinese: 徐健; pinyin: Xú Jiàn; born July 27, 1970) is a Chinese softball player. She competed in the 1996 Summer Olympics and in the 2000 Summer Olympics.

In 1996, she won the silver medal as part of the Chinese team. She played eight matches. In the 2000 Olympic softball competition she finished fourth with the Chinese team. She played five matches.
