= Qin Xuejing =

Chinese softball player

Personal information
- Born: August 14, 1972 (age 53)
- Height: 181 cm (5 ft 11 in)
Medal record
Women's softball
Representing China
Asian Games
Gold medal – first place	1998 Bangkok	Team

Qin Xuejing (simplified Chinese: 秦学静; traditional Chinese: 秦學靜; pinyin: Qín Xuéjìng; born August 14, 1972) is a female Chinese softball player. She competed in the 2000 Summer Olympics.

In the 2000 Olympic softball competition, she finished fourth with the Chinese team. She played one match as a pitcher.
