= Reika Utsugi =

Japanese softball player

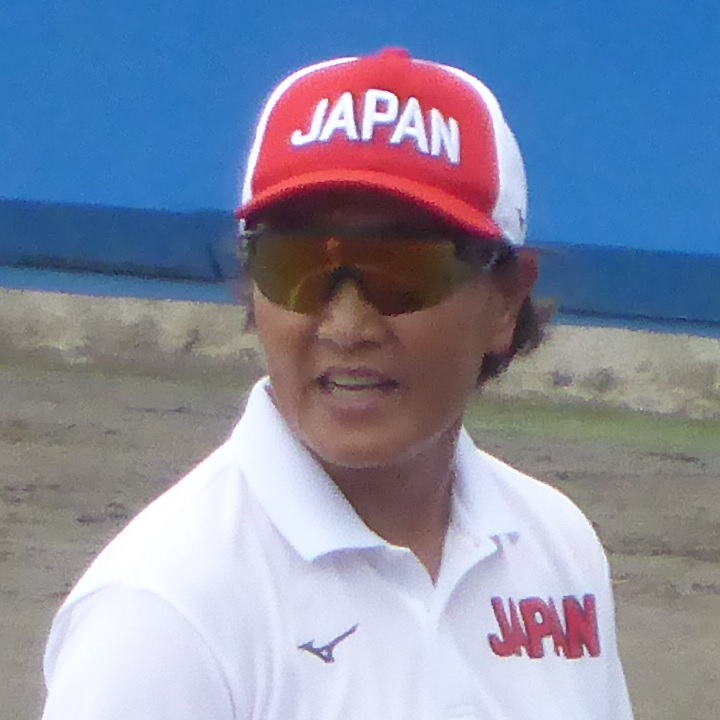

Personal information
- Native name: 宇津木 麗華, Utsugi Reika
- Nationality: Japanese
- Born: 任彦麗, Ren Yanli; 1 June 1963 (age 63) Beijing, China

Sport
- Country: Japan
- Sport: Softball
Medal record
Olympic Games
Gold medal – first place	2020 Tokyo	Softball
Bronze medal – third place	2004 Athens	Softball
Silver medal – second place	2000 Sydney	Softball
World Cup
Gold medal – first place	2012 Whitehorse	Team
Gold medal – first place	2014 Haarlem	Team
Silver medal – second place	2018 Chiba	Team
Asian Games
Gold medal – first place	2018 Jakarta-Palembang	Team
Gold medal – first place	2014 Incheon	Team
Gold medal – first place	2002 Busan	Team
Silver medal – second place	1998 Bangkok	Team

Reika Utsugi (宇津木 麗華, Utsugi Reika; born 1 June 1963) is a Japanese softball player who played third base. Originally from Beijing, China, she was naturalised as a Japanese citizen in 1995. She played in the Japanese teams that won the silver medal at the 2000 Summer Olympics and the bronze medal at the 2004 Summer Olympics, and served as manager of the team that won the gold medal at the 2020 Summer Olympics.

== Naturalisation ==
Utsugi's original name was Ren Yanli and was born in Beijing. Against her father's wishes, she arrived in Japan in 1988 and played for Hitachi Takasaki, which was managed by Taeko Utsugi. She took her manager's name when she naturalised in 1995, becoming Reika Utsugi. Utsugi could not participate in the 1996 Summer Olympics as a Japanese representative, despite being naturalised in 1995. The regulations in the Olympic charter required China to give her permission to play for Japan, as she had changed her nationality within three years of an Olympic event. China refused, realising the competitive threat that Utsugi posed. Hence, Utsugi's first Olympic appearance for Japan was in the 2000 Summer Olympics.

== Retirement ==
Since retiring as an athlete she has managed the softball team of Renesas Electronics. She currently manages Bic Camera Takasaki Bee Queen and has managed the Japan women's national softball team since 2011, leading them to two world titles.
