= Jennifer Holliday (softball) =

Australian softball player

Medal record

Representing Australia

Women's Softball

Olympic Games
Bronze medal – third place	1996 Atlanta	Team

Jennifer Kaye Holliday AM (born 18 January 1964 in Melbourne) is a softball player from Australia, who won a bronze medal at the 1996 Summer Olympics. She is the fastest women's softball pitcher, pitching at 123 km/h.

Holliday was appointed a Member of the Order of Australia in the 2016 Australia Day Honours in recognition of her contribution to softball as player, coach and administrator.
