= Yan Fang =

Chinese softball player (1969–2020)

Personal information
- Born: July 26, 1969 Beijing
- Died: February 8, 2020 (aged 50)
- Height: 171 cm (5 ft 7 in)
Medal record
Women's softball
Representing China
Olympic Games
| Silver medal – second place | 1996 Atlanta | Team |
Asian Games
| Gold medal – first place | 1990 Beijing | Team |
| Gold medal – first place | 1994 Hiroshima | Team |
| Gold medal – first place | 1998 Bangkok | Team |

Yan Fang (Chinese: 阎芳; pinyin: Yán Fāng; July 26, 1969 – February 8, 2020) was a Chinese female softball player. She competed in the 1996 Summer Olympics and in the 2000 Summer Olympics.

In 1996, she won the silver medal as part of the Chinese team. She played all ten matches.

In the 2000 Olympic softball competition she finished fourth with the Chinese team. She played all eight matches.
