= Liu Tzu-hsin =

Taiwanese softball player

Personal information
- Nationality: Taiwanese
- Born: 5 December 1972 (age 52)

Sport
- Sport: Softball

Liu Tzu-hsin (born 5 December 1972) is a Taiwanese softball player. She competed in the women's tournament at the 1996 Summer Olympics.
