= Wang Ying (softball) =

Chinese softball player

Personal information
- Born: December 31, 1968 (age 57) Beijing
- Height: 172 cm (5 ft 8 in)
Medal record
Women's softball
Representing China
Olympic Games
| Silver medal – second place | 1996 Atlanta | Team |
Asian Games
| Gold medal – first place | 1990 Beijing | Team |
| Gold medal – first place | 1994 Hiroshima | Team |
| Gold medal – first place | 1998 Bangkok | Team |

Wang Ying (Chinese: 王颖, born December 31, 1968) is a Chinese softball player who competed in the 1996 and 2000 Summer Olympics.

In 1996 she won the silver medal as part of the Chinese team. She played all ten matches.

In the 2000 Olympic softball competition Wang finished fourth with the Chinese team. She played all eight matches.
