= Yu Yanhong =

Chinese softball player

Personal information
- Born: August 1, 1976 (age 49) Lishu, Jilin
- Height: 168 cm (5 ft 6 in)
Medal record
Women's softball
Representing China
Asian Games
Gold medal – first place	1998 Bangkok	Team
Bronze medal – third place	2006 Doha	Team

Yu Yanhong (simplified Chinese: 于艳宏; traditional Chinese: 於艷宏; pinyin: Yú Yànhóng; born August 1, 1976) is a female Chinese softball player who competed in the 2000 and 2008 Summer Olympics .

In the 2000 Olympic softball competition she finished fourth with the Chinese team. She played all eight matches.
