= Sonja Pannen =

Dutch softball player (born 1968)

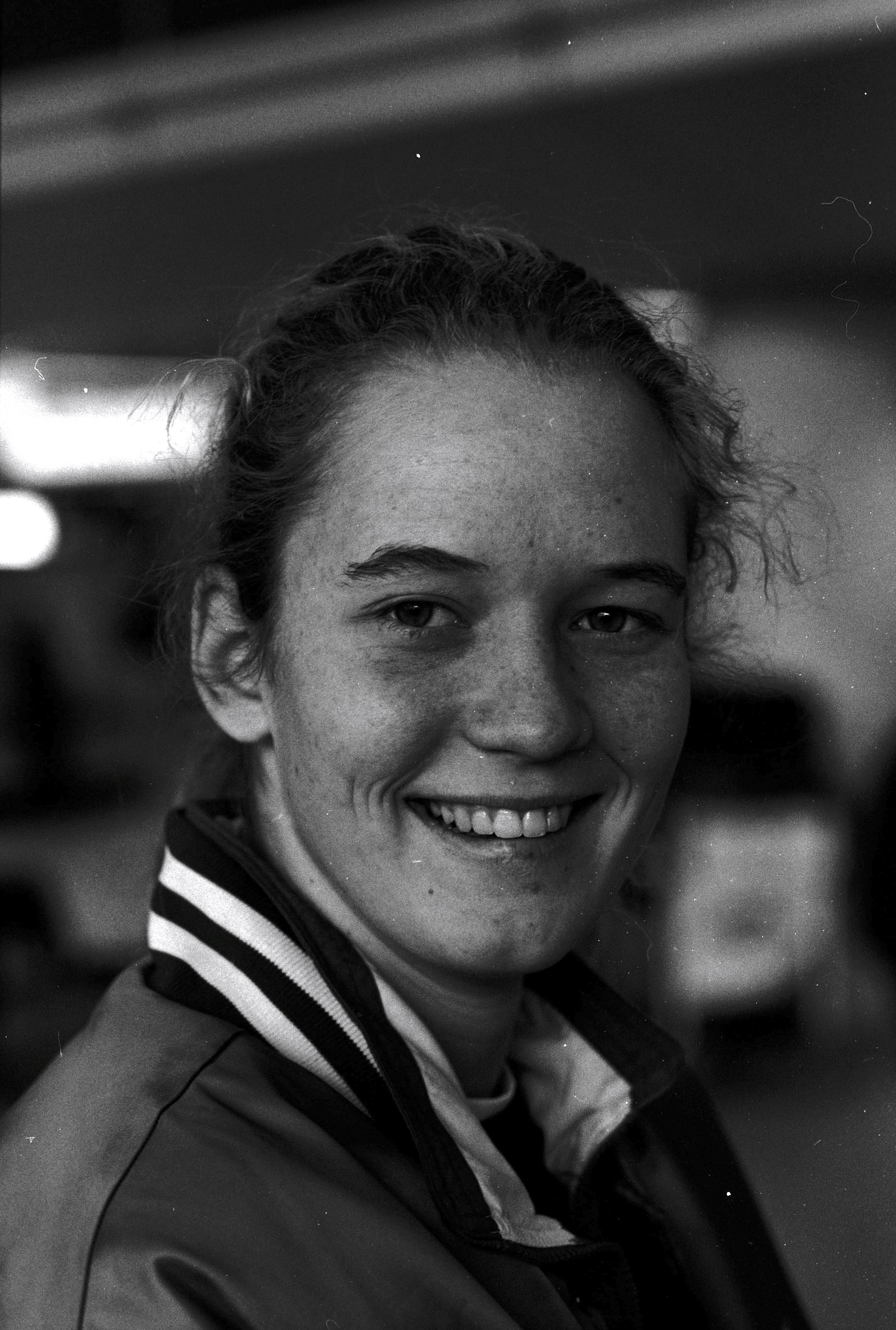
- Pannen (1996)

Personal information
- Nationality: Dutch
- Born: 15 November 1968 (age 56); Leiden, Netherlands

Sport
- Sport: Softball

Sonja Pannen (born 15 November 1968) is a Dutch softball player. She competed in the women's tournament at the 1996 Summer Olympics.
