= Kyoko Kobayashi =

Japanese softball player

Personal information
- Nationality: Japanese
- Born: 29 May 1972 (age 52); Aichi, Japan

Sport
- Sport: Softball

Kyoko Kobayashi (小林京子, Kobayashi Kyōko, born 29 May 1972) is a Japanese softball player. She competed in the women's tournament at the 1996 Summer Olympics.
