= Wei Qiang =

Chinese softball player

Personal information
- Born: April 25, 1972 (age 54) Beijing
- Height: 170 cm (5 ft 7 in)
Medal record
Women's softball
Representing China
Olympic Games
Silver medal – second place	1996 Atlanta	Team
Asian Games
Gold medal – first place	1994 Hiroshima	Team
Gold medal – first place	1998 Bangkok	Team
Silver medal – second place	2002 Busan	Team

Wei Qiang (simplified Chinese: 魏嫱; traditional Chinese: 魏嬙; pinyin: Wèi Qiáng; born April 25, 1972, in Beijing) is a female Chinese softball player. She competed in the 1996 Summer Olympics, in the 2000 Summer Olympics, and in the 2004 Summer Olympics.

In 1996, she won the silver medal as part of the Chinese team. She played all ten matches as infielder.

In the 2000 Olympic softball competition she finished fourth with the Chinese team. She played all eight matches as infielder.

Four years later she finished fourth again with the Chinese team in the 2004 Olympic softball tournament. She played all eight matches as infielder again.
