= Liu Yaju =

Chinese softball player

Personal information
- Born: April 25, 1972 (age 54) Tianjin
- Height: 172 cm (5 ft 8 in)
Medal record
Women's softball
Representing China
Olympic Games
Silver medal – second place	1996 Atlanta	Team
Asian Games
Gold medal – first place	1994 Hiroshima	Team

Liu Yaju (simplified Chinese: 刘雅菊; traditional Chinese: 劉雅菊; pinyin: Liú Yǎjú; born April 25, 1972) is a female Chinese softball player. She competed in the 1996 Summer Olympics.

In 1996, she won the silver medal as part of the Chinese team. She played seven matches as a pitcher.
