= Wang Xiaoyan (softball) =

Chinese softball player

Personal information
- Born: November 13, 1970 (age 55) Zhengzhou, Henan
- Height: 171 cm (5 ft 7 in)
Medal record
Women's softball
Representing China
Asian Games
| Gold medal – first place | 1990 Beijing | Team |
| Gold medal – first place | 1998 Bangkok | Team |
| Silver medal – second place | 2002 Busan | Team |

Wang Xiaoyan (simplified Chinese: 王晓燕; traditional Chinese: 王曉燕; pinyin: Wáng Xiǎoyàn; born November 13, 1970, in Zhengzhou, Henan) is a female Chinese softball player who competed at the 2004 Summer Olympics in Athens, Greece.

In the 2004 Olympic softball competition she finished fourth with the Chinese team. She played all eight matches as an infielder.
