= Mu Xia =

Chinese softball player

Personal information
- Born: April 28, 1974 (age 52) Tianjin
- Height: 170 cm (5 ft 7 in)
Medal record
Women's softball
Representing China
Asian Games
Gold medal – first place	1998 Bangkok	Team
Silver medal – second place	2002 Busan	Team

Mu Xia (Chinese: 穆霞; pinyin: Mù Xiá; born April 28, 1974) is a female Chinese softball player who competed at the 2000 Summer Olympics and at the 2004 Summer Olympics. She was born in Tianjin. In the 2000 Olympic softball competition she finished fourth with the Chinese team. She played all eight matches as outfielder. Four years later she finished fourth again with the Chinese team in the 2004 Olympic softball tournament. She played all eight matches as outfielder again.
