= Jacqueline Knol =

Dutch softball player (born 1977)

Personal information
- Nationality: Dutch
- Born: 7 January 1977 (age 48); Enschede, Netherlands

Sport
- Sport: Softball

Jacqueline Knol (born 7 January 1977) is a Dutch softball player. She competed in the women's tournament at the 1996 Summer Olympics.
