= Tao Hua =

Chinese softball player

Personal information
- Born: December 12, 1972 (age 53) Shanghai
- Height: 170 cm (5 ft 7 in)
Medal record
Women's softball
Representing China
Olympic Games
Silver medal – second place	1996 Atlanta	Team
Asian Games
Gold medal – first place	1994 Hiroshima	Team
Gold medal – first place	1998 Bangkok	Team
Silver medal – second place	2002 Busan	Team

Tao Hua (simplified Chinese: 陶桦; traditional Chinese: 陶樺; pinyin: Táo Huà; born December 12, 1972, in Shanghai) is a female Chinese softball player who competed in the 1996 Summer Olympics, in the 2000 Summer Olympics, and in the 2004 Summer Olympics.

In 1996 she won the silver medal as part of the Chinese team. She played all ten matches as infielder.

In the 2000 Olympic softball competition she finished fourth with the Chinese team. She played all eight matches as infielder.

Four years later she finished fourth again with the Chinese team in the 2004 Olympic softball tournament. She played all eight matches as infielder again.
