= Zhang Chunfang =

Chinese softball player

Personal information
- Born: March 29, 1969 (age 57) Beijing
- Height: 167 cm (5 ft 6 in)
Medal record
Women's softball
Representing China
Olympic Games
Silver medal – second place	1996 Atlanta	Team
Asian Games
Gold medal – first place	1990 Beijing	Team
Gold medal – first place	1994 Hiroshima	Team
Gold medal – first place	1998 Bangkok	Team
Silver medal – second place	2002 Busan	Team

Zhang Chunfang (simplified Chinese: 张春芳; traditional Chinese: 張春芳; pinyin: Zhāng Chūnfāng; born March 29, 1969) is a female Chinese softball player. She competed in the 1996 Summer Olympics and in the 2000 Summer Olympics.

In 1996, she won the silver medal as part of the Chinese team. She played all ten matches.

In the 2000 Olympic softball competition she finished fourth with the Chinese team. She played all eight matches.
