= Chen Hong (softball) =

Chinese softball player (born 1970)

Personal information
- Born: February 28, 1970 (age 56) Beijing
- Height: 172 cm (5 ft 8 in)
Medal record
Women's softball
Representing China
Olympic Games
Silver medal – second place	1996 Atlanta	Team
Asian Games
Gold medal – first place	1994 Hiroshima	Team
Gold medal – first place	1998 Bangkok	Team

Chen Hong (Chinese: 陈红, born February 28, 1970) is a Chinese softball player who competed in the 1996 Summer Olympics.

In 1996 she won the silver medal as part of the Chinese team. She played all ten matches.
