= Deng Xiaoling =

Chinese softball player (born 1974)

Personal information
- Born: August 26, 1974 (age 52) Deyang, Sichuan
- Height: 168 cm (5 ft 6 in)
Medal record
Women's softball
Representing China
Asian Games
Gold medal – first place	1998 Bangkok	Team
Silver medal – second place	2002 Busan	Team

Deng Xiaoling (simplified Chinese: 邓小玲; traditional Chinese: 鄧小玲; pinyin: Dèng Xiǎolíng; born August 26, 1974, in Deyang, Sichuan) is a female Chinese softball player. She competed at the 2000 Summer Olympics and at the 2004 Summer Olympics.

== Biography ==
In the 2000 Olympic softball competition, Xiaoling finished fourth with the Chinese team. She played all eight matches as infielder.

Four years later she finished fourth again with the Chinese team in the 2004 Olympic softball tournament. She played all eight matches as infielder again.
