= Ou Jingbai =

Chinese softball player

Personal information
- Born: June 2, 1971 (age 55) Beijing
- Height: 174 cm (5 ft 9 in)
Medal record
Women's softball
Representing China
Olympic Games
Silver medal – second place	1996 Atlanta	Team
Asian Games
Gold medal – first place	1990 Beijing	Team
Gold medal – first place	1994 Hiroshima	Team

Ou Jingbai (simplified Chinese: 欧敬柏; traditional Chinese: 歐敬柏; pinyin: Ōu Jìngbǎi; born June 2, 1971) is a female Chinese softball player who competed in the 1996 Summer Olympics.

In 1996 she won the silver medal as part of the Chinese team. She played six matches.
