= Liu Xuqing =

Chinese softball player

Personal information
- Born: August 15, 1968 (age 57) Shanghai
- Height: 166 cm (5 ft 5 in)
Medal record
Women's softball
Representing China
Olympic Games
Silver medal – second place	1996 Atlanta	Team
Asian Games
Gold medal – first place	1990 Beijing	Team
Gold medal – first place	1994 Hiroshima	Team

Liu Xuqing (Chinese: 柳絮青; pinyin: Liǔ Xùqīng; born August 15, 1968) is a female Chinese softball player. She competed in the 1996 Summer Olympics.

In 1996, she won the silver medal as part of the Chinese team. She played all ten matches.
