= Wang Lihong (softball) =

Chinese softball player

Personal information
- Born: November 22, 1970 (age 55) Dunhua, Jilin
- Height: 168 cm (5 ft 6 in)
Medal record
Women's softball
Representing China
Olympic Games
Silver medal – second place	1996 Atlanta	Team
Asian Games
Gold medal – first place	1990 Beijing	Team
Gold medal – first place	1994 Hiroshima	Team
Gold medal – first place	1998 Bangkok	Team

Wang Lihong (simplified Chinese: 王丽红; traditional Chinese: 王麗紅; pinyin: Wáng Lìhóng; born November 22, 1970) is a Chinese softball player who competed in the 1996 and 2000 Summer Olympics.

In 1996 she won the silver medal as part of the Chinese team. She played seven matches as pitcher.

In the 2000 Olympic softball competition Wang finished fourth with the Chinese team. She played three matches as pitcher.
