= Masako Watanabe (softball) =

Japanese softball player

Personal information
- Nationality: Japanese
- Born: 6 August 1971 (age 53); Saitama, Japan

Sport
- Sport: Softball

Masako Watanabe (渡辺正子, Watanabe Masako; born 6 August 1971) is a Japanese softball player. She competed in the women's tournament at the 1996 Summer Olympics.
