= Lei Li (softball) =

Chinese softball player

Personal information
- Born: January 21, 1968 (age 58) Jilin
- Height: 166 cm (5 ft 5 in)
Medal record
Women's softball
Representing China
Olympic Games
Silver medal – second place	1996 Atlanta	Team
Asian Games
Gold medal – first place	1994 Hiroshima	Team

Lei Li (simplified Chinese: 雷雳; traditional Chinese: 雷靂; pinyin: Léi Lì; born January 21, 1968) is a female Chinese softball player who competed in the 1996 Summer Olympics.

In 1996 she won the silver medal as part of the Chinese team. She played nine matches.
