= Mayumi Inoue =

Japanese softball player

Personal information
- Nationality: Japanese
- Born: 14 July 1970 (age 54); Hyogo, Japan

Sport
- Sport: Softball

Mayumi Inoue (井上真由美, Inoue Mayumi; born 14 July 1970) is a Japanese softball player. She competed in the women's tournament at the 1996 Summer Olympics.
