= Fengtai Softball Field =

Sports venue in Beijing, China

Coordinates: 39°51′53.83″N 116°16′09.80″E

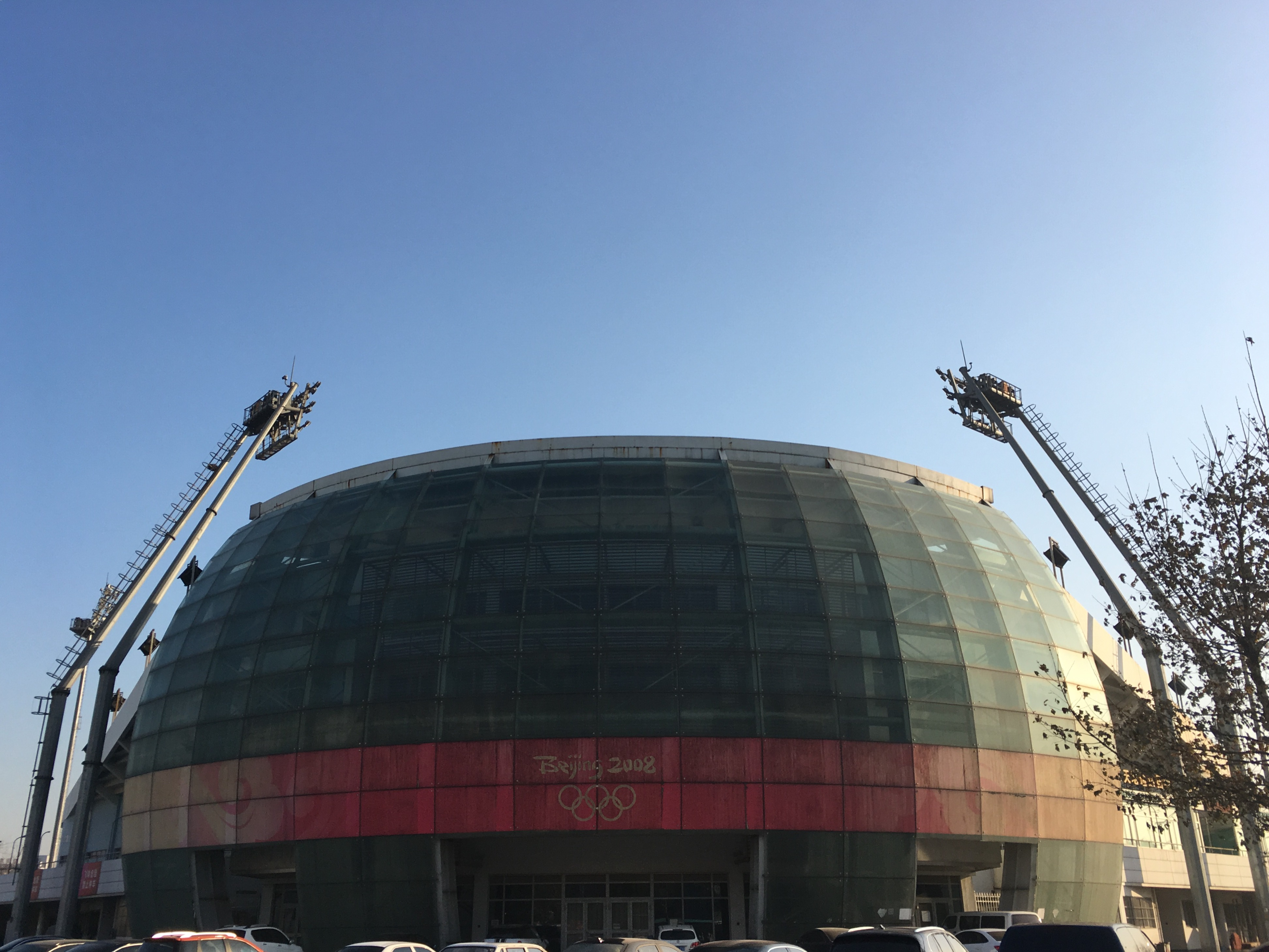
Fengtai Softball Field, Beijing

Fengtai Softball Field, or Fengtai Sports Center Softball Field (simplified Chinese: 丰台体育中心垒球场; traditional Chinese: 豐臺體育中心壘球場; pinyin: Fēngtái Tǐyù Zhōngxīn Lěiqiúchǎng), is a softball stadium located in Beijing, China. It hosted the softball competitions at the 2008 Summer Olympics.

The complex consists of two competition grounds and one training ground. The stadium has a capacity of 13,000 and a floor space of 15,570 square metres. It also has a backup field with a capacity of 3,500 and two training fields.

It was also one of the venues of the 1990 Asian Games and the 1992 Women's Softball World Cup.

The stadium's renovation was completed on July 28, 2006, ready for the XI ISF Women's World Championship in late August. It was the first Olympic venue in Beijing to be completed and put to use.

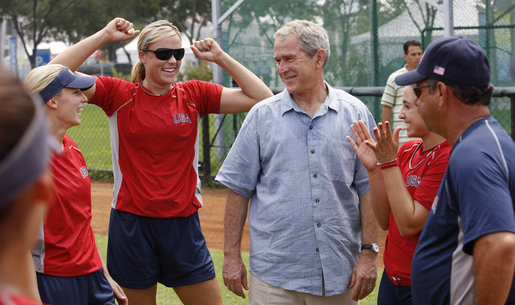
2008 U.S. Women's Softball team and President Bush
