= Chen Han-hung =

Taiwanese diver

Personal information
- Nationality: Taiwanese
- Born: 21 December 1976 (age 48)

Sport
- Sport: Diving

Chen Han-hung (traditional Chinese: 陳漢鴻; simplified Chinese: 陈汉鸿; pinyin: Chén Hànhóng; born 21 December 1976) is a Taiwanese diver. He competed at the 1996 Summer Olympics and the 2000 Summer Olympics.
