= Mou Ying-hsin =

Taiwanese swimmer

Personal information
- Born: 7 November 1977 (age 48)

Sport
- Sport: Swimming

Mou Ying-hsin (born 7 November 1977) is a Taiwanese breaststroke swimmer. She competed in three events at the 1996 Summer Olympics.
