= Chika Kodama =

Japanese softball player

Personal information
- Nationality: Japanese
- Born: 19 March 1970 (age 55); Hyogo, Japan

Sport
- Sport: Softball

Chika Kodama (児玉千佳, Kodama Chika; born 19 March 1970) is a Japanese softball player. She competed in the women's tournament at the 1996 Summer Olympics.
