= Lin Chien-ju =

Taiwanese swimmer

Personal information
- Born: September 12, 1977 (age 48)

Sport
- Sport: Swimming

Lin Chien-ju (born 12 September 1977) is a swimmer who represented Chinese Taipei at the 1996 Summer Olympic Games.

== Olympics ==
Lin finished 38th in the women's 50m freestyle out of 55 competitors. She took part in the women's 4 × 100 metre freestyle relay finishing 18th and placed 24th in the women's 4 × 100 metre medley relay.
