= Yukiko Ueno =

Japanese softball player

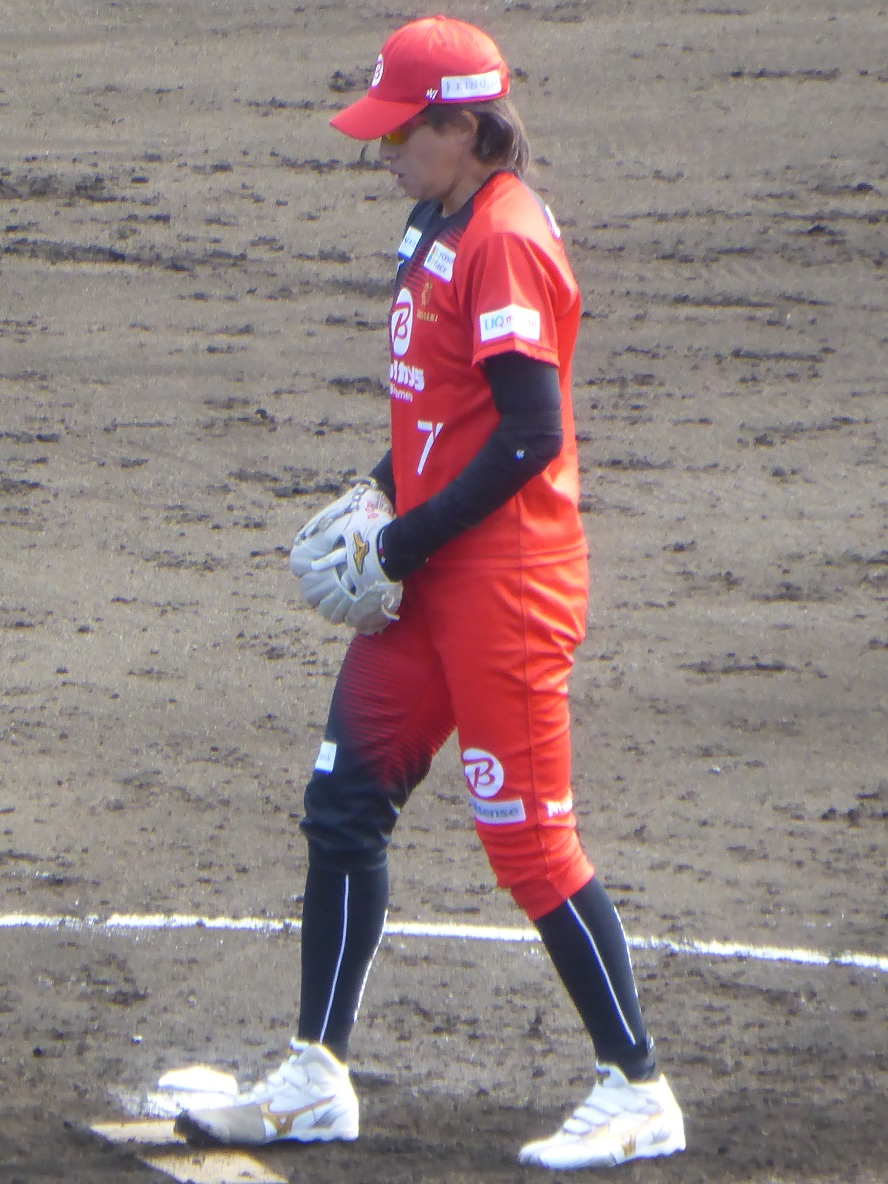

Bic Camera Takasaki Bee Queen – No. 7
- Pitcher
- Born: July 22, 1982 (age 44); Fukuoka, Japan
- Bats: Right Throws: Right
Medals
Women's softball
Representing Japan
Olympic Games
Bronze medal – third place	2004 Athens	Team
Gold medal – first place	2008 Beijing	Team
Gold medal – first place	2020 Tokyo	Team
World Cup
Gold medal – first place	2012 Whitehorse	Team
Gold medal – first place	2014 Haarlem	Team
Gold medal – first place	2024 Castions di Strada	Team
Silver medal – second place	2002 Saskatoon	Team
Silver medal – second place	2006 Beijing	Team
Silver medal – second place	2018 Chiba	Team
World Games
Bronze medal – third place	2025 Chengdu	Team
Asian Games
Gold medal – first place	2002 Busan	Team
Gold medal – first place	2006 Doha	Team
Gold medal – first place	2010 Guangzhou	Team
Gold medal – first place	2014 Incheon	Team
Gold medal – first place	2018 Jakarta-Palembang	Team
Gold medal – first place	2022 Hangzhou	Team
Gold medal – first place	2026 Aichi-Nagoya	Team
Asian Championship
Gold medal – first place	2017 Taichung	Team

Yukiko Ueno (上野 由岐子, Ueno Yukiko; born July 22, 1982) is a Japanese professional softball pitcher for Bic Camera Takasaki Bee Queen and Japan women's national softball team. She won a bronze and two gold medals from the 2004, 2008 and 2020 Summer Olympics, respectively. She became the first pitcher ever to throw a perfect game at the Olympics, against China in Athens. With a fastball that tops out at 128 km/h (80 mph), she is widely recognized as the fastest pitcher in women's softball, although her signature pitch is her change-up, which is often cited as the best in the world.

== Career ==
=== 2006 ===
In 2006, World Women's Softball Championship in Beijing, she shut out the U.S. team in the semifinal, but lost the final against the same U.S. team.

=== Perseverance at the 2008 Olympics ===
In the 2008 Summer Olympics, she again lost to the U.S. in the playoff allowing four runs in the tiebreak ninth inning, after shutting out the opponent until the previous inning. Yet, she won the final against the same U.S. by pitching her fifth complete game, allowing only one run in seven innings.

She threw over 600 pitches at the 2008 Beijing Summer Olympics in 4 days (413 in the last two days during which she completed three games, two of which went extra innings). During the semi-final and final games of the softball event, which lasted for two days and included three games, Ueno pitched 28 innings against the United States and Australia, considered the two best lineups in the world. NBC commentator Rob Baird described Ueno's feat as "one of the most amazing pitching performances in recent memory."

=== 2020 Olympics ===
Ueno again joined Team Japan at the postponed 2020 Olympics in 2021. She went 2-0 for the team, allowing three earned runs, 13 hits, 6 walks and struck out 26 batters for a 0.95 ERA and 0.86 WHIP. She pitched 6 innings against the US in the gold medal game, along with teammate Miu Goto to shutout the Americans 2–0 on July 27, 2021. She became the first non-American pitcher to win and hold two gold medals in the Olympics for softball.

== Popular culture ==
The pronunciation of Ueno's surname was brought to the attention of comedy duo Hamish & Andy during the Olympics. This was due to the name being very similar to a stereotypical Australian or Strine nickname for Wayne, 'Wayno'. It also is pronounced exactly the same way to national baseball pitcher, Wayne Ough. The segment was included on their compilation album Unessential Listening.
