= Noriko Harada =

Japanese softball player (born 1972)

Personal information
- Nationality: Japanese
- Born: 6 November 1972 (age 52); Saitama, Japan

Sport
- Sport: Softball

Noriko Harada (原田教子, Harada Noriko; born 6 November 1972) is a Japanese softball player. She competed in the women's tournament at the 1996 Summer Olympics.
