= Chen Feng-yin =

Taiwanese softball player

Personal information
- Nationality: Taiwanese
- Born: 19 December 1979 (age 45)

Sport
- Sport: Softball

Chen Feng-yin (born 19 December 1979) is a Taiwanese softball player. She competed in the women's tournament at the 2004 Summer Olympics.
