= Chien Pei-chi =

Taiwanese softball player

Personal information
- Nationality: Taiwanese
- Born: 13 June 1971 (age 54)

Sport
- Sport: Softball

Chien Pei-chi (born 13 June 1971) is a Taiwanese softball player. She competed in the women's tournament at the 1996 Summer Olympics.
