= Lin Po-jen =

Taiwanese softball player

Personal information
- Nationality: Taiwanese
- Born: 26 March 1981 (age 44)

Sport
- Sport: Softball

Lin Po-jen (born 26 March 1981) is a Taiwanese softball player. She competed in the women's tournament at the 2004 Summer Olympics.
