= Yuka Ichiguchi =

Japanese softball player

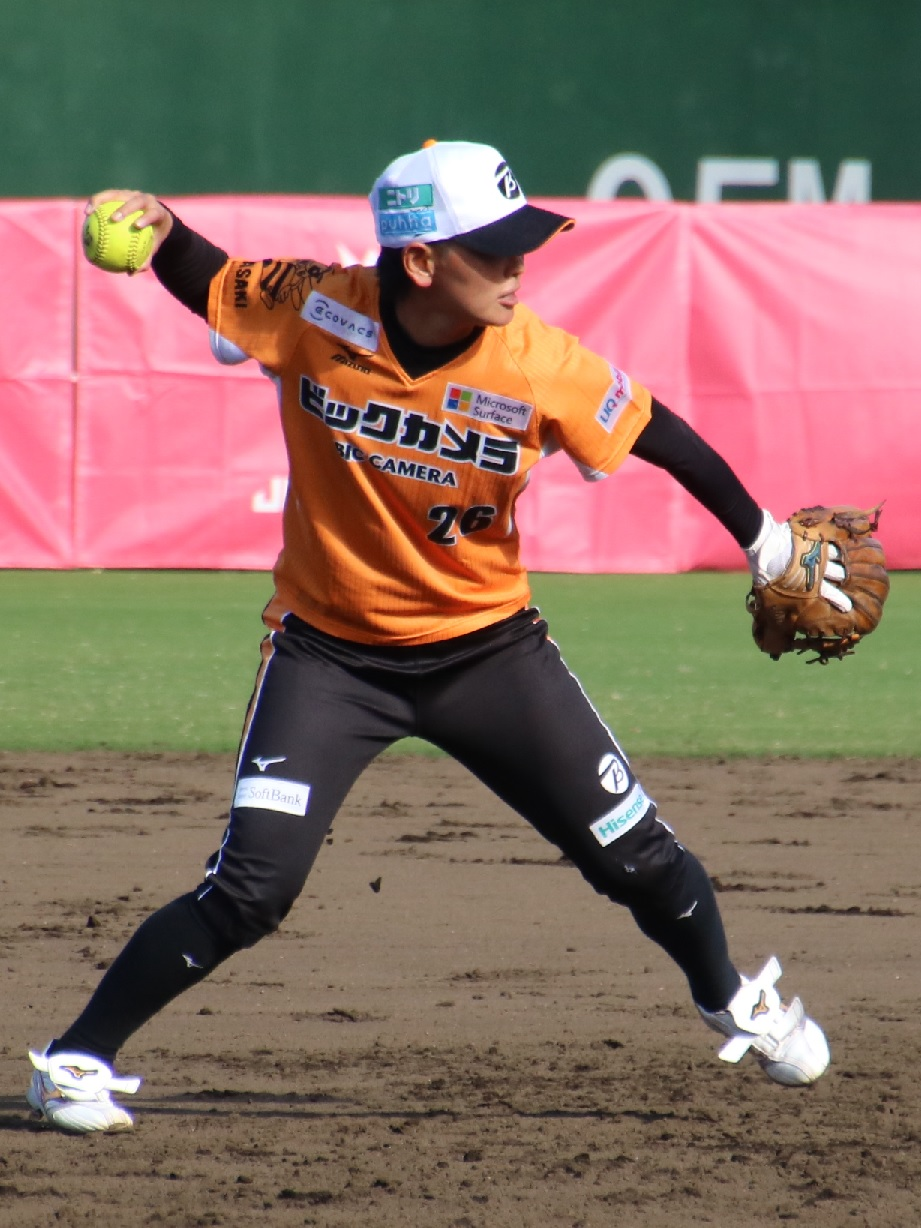
- Ichiguchi in 2023

Bic Camera Takasaki Bee Queen – No. 26
- Infield
- Born: 3 July 1992 (age 33); Japan
- Bats: Left Throws: Right
Medals
Women's softball
Representing Japan
Olympic Games
Gold medal – first place	2020 Tokyo	Team
World Cup
Gold medal – first place	2014 Haarlem	Team
Silver medal – second place	2018 Surrey	Team
Silver medal – second place	2018 Chiba	Team
World Games
Silver medal – second place	2022 Birmingham	Team
Asian Games
Gold medal – first place	2018 Jakarta-Palembang	Team
Asian Championship
Gold medal – first place	2019 Jakarta	Team

Yuka Ichiguchi (市口侑果, Ichiguchi Yuka) is a Japanese softball player who plays as an infielder. She helped Japan qualify for the 2020 Summer Olympics.

== Playing career ==
She participated at the 2013 World Cup of Softball and 2018 Women's Softball World Championship.

She plays for the Bic Camera Takasaki Bee Queen.
