= Guo Jia (softball) =

Chinese softball player (born 1980)

Medal record

Women's softball

Representing China

Asian Games
Silver medal – second place	2010 Guangzhou	Softball

Guo Jia (born 24 September 1980 in Xiangtan, Hunan) is a Chinese softball player who competed at the 2004 Summer Olympics. In the 2004 Olympic softball competition she was a member of the Chinese team which finished fourth. Guo was a member of Team China at the 2008 Summer Olympics in Beijing.
