= Ou Ching-chieh =

Taiwanese softball player

Personal information
- Nationality: Taiwanese
- Born: 13 June 1976 (age 49)

Sport
- Sport: Softball

Ou Ching-chieh (born 13 June 1976) is a Taiwanese softball player. She competed in the women's tournament at the 1996 Summer Olympics.
