= Tung Yun-chi =

Taiwanese softball player

Tung Yun-Chi (東 昀錡, born December 27, 1981, in Kaohsiung) is a Taiwanese softball player. She competed for the Chinese Taipei women's national softball team at the 2004 and 2008 Summer Olympics.
