= Lu Hsueh-mei =

Taiwanese softball player

Lu Hsueh-mei (born 13 November 1987 in Kaohsiung) is a Taiwanese softball player. She competed for Chinese Taipei at the 2008 Summer Olympics.
