= Pan Tzu-hui =

Taiwanese softball player

Pan Tzu-hui (Chinese: 潘慈惠; born January 8, 1983, in Nantou County, Republic of China (Taiwan)) is a Taiwanese softball player. She competed for Chinese Taipei at the 2004 and 2008 Summer Olympics.
