= Wu Chia-yen =

Taiwanese softball player

Wu Chia-Yen (Chinese: 吳佳燕; pinyin: Wú Jiāyàn; born June 28, 1980) is a Taiwanese softball player. She competed for Chinese Taipei at the 2004 and 2008 Summer Olympics.
