= Chiu Chen-ting =

Taiwanese softball player

Personal information
- Nationality: Taiwanese
- Born: 23 November 1975 (age 49)

Sport
- Sport: Softball

Chiu Chen-ting (born 23 November 1975) is a Taiwanese softball player. She competed in the women's tournament at the 1996 Summer Olympics.
