= Lo Hsiao-ting =

Taiwanese softball player (born 1982)

Lo Hsiao-Ting (born May 8, 1982 in Nantou) is a Taiwanese softball player. She competed for Chinese Taipei at the 2008 Summer Olympics.
