= Lin Su-hua =

Taiwanese softball player

Lin Su-Hua (林 素華, born October 12, 1980, in Nantou) is a Taiwanese softball player. She competed for Chinese Taipei at the 2004 and 2008 Summer Olympics.
