= Lai Meng-ting =

Taiwanese softball player (born 1984)

Lai Meng-Ting (born March 1, 1984) is a Taiwanese softball player. She competed for Chinese Taipei at the 2008 Summer Olympics.
