= Chiang Hui-chuan =

Taiwanese softball player (born 1981)

Chiang Hui-Chuan (born May 4, 1981) is a Taiwanese softball player. She competed for Chinese Taipei at the 2008 Summer Olympics.
