= Misako Ando =

Japanese softball player (born 1971)

Misako Ando (安藤 美佐子, Andō Misako) (born March 21, 1971) is a Japanese softball player who plays as a shortstop. She won the silver medal at the 2000 Summer Olympics.
