= Chang Hsiao-ching =

Taiwanese softball player (born 1973)

Personal information
- Nationality: Taiwanese
- Born: 30 January 1973 (age 52)

Sport
- Sport: Softball

Chang Hsiao-ching (born 30 January 1973) is a Taiwanese softball player. She competed in the women's tournament at the 1996 Summer Olympics.
