= Noriko Yamaji =

Japanese softball player

- Coach
- Born: September 17, 1970 (age 54); Japan
Medals
Women's softball
Representing Japan
Olympic Games
Gold medal – first place	2020 Tokyo	Softball
Bronze medal – third place	2004 Athens	Softball
Silver medal – second place	2000 Sydney	Softball

Noriko Yamaji (山路 典子, Yamaji Noriko) (born September 17, 1970) is a Japanese softball player who played first base and as a catcher in the Olympic Games from 1996 to 2004. For the team she won a silver medal in 2000 and the bronze medal in 2004. She also served as a coach for the gold medal winning team at the 2020 Summer Olympics.
