= Lai Sheng-jung =

Taiwanese softball player

Lai Sheng-jung (simplified Chinese: 赖圣蓉; traditional Chinese: 賴聖蓉; pinyin: Lài Shèngróng) is a Taiwanese softball player. She carried Chinese Taipei's Olympic Flag at the 2008 Summer Olympics in Beijing.
