= Liu Chia-chi =

Taiwanese softball player

Personal information
- Nationality: Taiwanese
- Born: 8 October 1977 (age 47)

Sport
- Sport: Softball

Liu Chia-chi (born 8 October 1977) is a Taiwanese softball player. She competed in the women's tournament at the 1996 Summer Olympics.
