= Chen Miao-yi =

Taiwanese softball player

Chen Miao-Yi (陳 妙怡, born February 23, 1983, in Nantou) is a Taiwanese softball player. She competed for Chinese Taipei at the 2004 and 2008 Summer Olympics.
