= Juri Takayama =

Japanese softball player

Juri Takayama (高山 樹里, Takayama Juri; born October 21, 1976) is a Japanese softball player who played as a pitcher between 1996 and 2004 in the Olympic Games. She won two medals for Japan.
