= Chien Chen-ju =

Taiwanese softball player

Personal information
- Nationality: Taiwanese
- Born: 4 March 1975 (age 50)

Sport
- Sport: Softball

Chien Chen-ju (born 4 March 1975) is a Taiwanese softball player. She competed in the women's tournament at the 1996 Summer Olympics.
