= Huang Hui-wen =

Taiwanese softball player (born 1980)

Huang Hui-Wen (born February 3, 1980, in Hualien, Taiwan) is a Taiwanese softball player. She competed for Chinese Taipei at the 2004 and 2008 Summer Olympics.
