= Chung Chiung-yao =

Taiwanese softball player

Personal information
- Nationality: Taiwanese
- Born: 23 January 1973 (age 52)

Sport
- Sport: Softball

Chung Chiung-yao (born 23 January 1973) is a Taiwanese softball player. She competed in the women's tournament at the 1996 Summer Olympics.
