= Han Hsin-lin =

Taiwanese softball player

Personal information
- Nationality: Taiwanese
- Born: 27 June 1973 (age 51)

Sport
- Sport: Softball

Han Hsin-lin (born 27 June 1973) is a Taiwanese softball player. She competed in the women's tournament at the 1996 Summer Olympics.
