= Yang Hui-chun =

Taiwanese softball player

Personal information
- Nationality: Taiwanese
- Born: 10 April 1970 (age 55)

Sport
- Sport: Softball

Yang Hui-chun (born 10 April 1970) is a Taiwanese softball player. She competed at the 1996 Summer Olympics and the 2004 Summer Olympics.
