= Yen Show-tzu =

Taiwanese softball player

Personal information
- Nationality: Taiwanese
- Born: 19 October 1971 (age 53); Taichung, Taiwan

Sport
- Sport: Softball

Yen Show-tzu (born 19 October 1971) is a Taiwanese softball player. She competed at the 1996 Summer Olympics and the 2004 Summer Olympics.
