= Tu Hui-ping =

Taiwanese softball player

Personal information
- Nationality: Taiwanese
- Born: 13 November 1970 (age 54)

Sport
- Sport: Softball

Tu Hui-ping (born 13 November 1970) is a Taiwanese softball player. She competed in the women's tournament at the 1996 Summer Olympics.
