= Wang Ya-fen =

Taiwanese softball player

Personal information
- Nationality: Taiwanese
- Born: 8 October 1969 (age 55)

Sport
- Sport: Softball

Wang Ya-fen (born 8 October 1969) is a Taiwanese softball player.

== Career ==
She competed at the 1996 Summer Olympics and the 2004 Summer Olympics.
