= Softball at the 1996 Summer Olympics =

Softball at the Games of the XXVI Olympiad
- Venue: Golden Park
- Dates: July 21–30, 1996
- Teams: 8

Medalists
1st place, gold medalist(s)		United States
2nd place, silver medalist(s)		China
3rd place, bronze medalist(s)		Australia

Women's softball made its first appearance as an official medal sport at the 1996 Summer Olympics. The competition was held at Golden Park in Columbus, Georgia, United States. Final results for the softball competition at the 1996 Summer Olympics appear below.

== Medalists ==
Event	Gold	Silver	Bronze
Women's tournament	United States Laura Berg; Gillian Boxx; Sheila Cornell; Lisa Fernandez; Michele Granger; Lori Harrigan; Dionna Harris; Kim Maher; Leah O'Brien; Dot Richardson; Julie Smith; Michele Smith; Shelly Stokes; Danielle Tyler; Christa Lee Williams	China An Zhongxin; Chen Hong; He Liping; Lei Li; Liu Xuqing; Liu Yaju; Ma Ying; Ou Jingbai; Tao Hua; Wang Lihong; Wang Ying; Wei Qiang; Xu Jian; Yan Fang; Zhang Chunfang	Australia Joanne Brown; Kim Cooper; Carolyn Crudgington; Kerry Dienelt; Peta Edebone; Tanya Harding; Jennifer Holliday; Joyce Lester; Sally McDermid; Francine McRae; Haylea Petrie; Nicole Richardson; Melanie Roche; Natalie Ward; Brooke Wilkins

== Participants ==
- Australia
- Canada
- China
- Chinese Taipei
- Japan
- Netherlands
- Puerto Rico
- United States

== Competition format ==
Eight teams competed in the Olympic softball tournament, and the competition consisted of two rounds. The preliminary round followed a round robin format, where each of the teams played all the other teams once. Following this, the top four teams advanced to a page playoff system round consisting of two semifinal games, and finally the bronze and gold medal games.

== Group stage ==
Qualified for the semifinals
Eliminated

The top four teams advanced to the semifinal round.

Team	W	L	RS	RA	WIN%	GB	Tiebreaker
United States	6	1	37	7	.857	-	-
China	5	2	29	9	.714	1	3 RA vs. AUS/JPN
Australia	5	2	22	11	.714	1	6 RA vs. CHN/JPN
Japan	5	2	24	18	.714	1	10 RA vs. CHN/AUS
Canada	3	4	15	17	.429	3	-
Chinese Taipei	2	5	19	19	.286	4	-
Netherlands	1	6	4	32	.143	5	1–0 vs. PUR
Puerto Rico	1	6	5	44	.143	5	0–1 vs. NED

July 21

Team	1	2	3	4	5	6	R	H	E
Puerto Rico	0	0	0	0	0	0	0	2	3
United States	2	0	3	0	0	5	10	13	0
WP: Granger (1–0) LP: Martinez (0–1)

Team	1	2	3	4	5	6	7	8	9	10	R	H	E
Chinese Taipei	0	1	0	0	0	0	0	0	0	0	1	5	1
Canada	0	0	0	0	0	0	1	0	0	1	2	8	3
WP: Sippel (1–0) LP: Tu HP (0–1)

Team	1	2	3	4	5	6	7	R	H	E
China	2	0	0	1	0	0	3	6	6	0
Australia	0	0	0	0	0	0	0	0	2	0
WP: Wang L (1–0) LP: Roche (0–1)

Team	1	2	3	4	5	6	7	R	H	E
Japan	0	0	0	0	0	0	3	3	7	0
Netherlands	0	0	0	0	0	0	0	0	2	0
WP: Takayama (1–0) LP: Mels (0–1)

July 22

Team	1	2	3	4	5	6	7	R	H	E
Australia	0	1	2	1	0	0	0	4	7	0
Chinese Taipei	0	0	0	0	0	0	0	0	4	0
WP: Harding (1–0) LP: Han (0–1)

Team	1	2	3	4	5	6	7	R	H	E
China	0	0	0	0	0	0	0	0	6	0
Japan	0	0	0	0	0	3	–	3	5	1
WP: T Watanabe (1–0) LP: Wang L (1–1)

Team	1	2	3	4	5	6	7	R	H	E
Puerto Rico	0	0	0	0	0	0	0	0	2	1
Canada	0	0	0	0	0	4	–	4	4	0
WP: Snelgrove (1–0) LP: Echevarría (0–1)

Team	1	2	3	4	5	6	7	R	H	E
Netherlands	0	0	0	0	0	0	0	0	2	3
United States	0	5	0	3	1	0	–	9	10	1
WP: Williams (1–0) LP: Knol (0–1)

July 23

Team	1	2	3	4	5	6	7	R	H	E
China	2	0	0	0	0	0	0	2	5	1
Canada	0	0	1	0	0	0	0	1	5	2
WP: Wang L (2–1) LP: Sippel (1–1)

Team	1	2	3	4	5	6	7	R	H	E
Chinese Taipei	0	0	0	0	0	5	2	7	12	0
Netherlands	0	0	0	0	1	0	0	1	6	1
WP: Tu HM (1–0) LP: Mels (0–2)

Team	1	2	3	4	5	6	7	R	H	E
Japan	0	0	0	0	1	0	0	0	2	1
United States	3	0	0	0	0	3	–	6	10	0
WP: M Smith (1–0) LP: Kobayashi (0–1)

Team	1	2	3	4	5	6	7	R	H	E
Australia	0	0	0	0	0	0	0	0	2	1
Puerto Rico	0	2	0	0	0	0	–	2	2	1
WP: Echevarría (1–1) LP: Wilkins (0–1)

July 24

Team	1	2	3	4	5	6	7	R	H	E
Chinese Taipei	0	0	0	0	0	0	0	0	2	4
United States	1	1	2	0	0	0	–	4	5	1
WP: Harrigan (1–0) LP: Tu HM (1–1)

Team	1	2	3	4	5	R	H	E
China	0	5	1	4	0	10	11	0
Puerto Rico	0	0	0	0	0	0	1	5
WP: Ma (1–0) LP: Mize (0–1)

Team	1	2	3	4	5	6	7	8	R	H	E
Australia	0	0	0	0	0	0	0	1	1	5	0
Netherlands	0	0	0	0	0	0	0	0	0	2	0
WP: Holliday (1–0) LP: Mels (0–3)

Team	1	2	3	4	5	6	7	R	H	E
Canada	0	0	0	0	0	0	0	0	5	0
Japan	1	0	0	3	0	0	–	4	9	1
WP: Takayama (2–0) LP: Sonnenberg (0–1)

July 25

Team	1	2	3	4	5	6	7	R	H	E
Netherlands	0	0	0	0	0	0	0	0	0	3
China	2	0	0	3	2	1	–	8	13	1
WP: He (1–0) LP: Pannen (0–1)

Team	1	2	3	4	5	6	7	R	H	E
Australia	0	0	0	0	4	0	6	10	11	0
Japan	0	0	0	0	0	0	0	0	4	2
WP: Roche (1–1) LP: T Watanabe (1–1)

Team	1	2	3	4	5	6	7	R	H	E
Puerto Rico	1	1	0	0	0	0	0	2	6	0
Chinese Taipei	0	1	0	0	9	0	–	10	11	1
WP: Tu HM (2–1) LP: Echevarría (1–2)

Team	1	2	3	4	5	6	7	R	H	E
United States	0	0	0	1	1	0	2	4	4	1
Canada	0	0	0	0	2	0	0	2	6	5
WP: Williams (2–0) LP: Snelgrove (1–1)

July 26

Team	1	2	3	4	5	6	7	R	H	E
Japan	0	0	1	4	0	2	1	8	12	1
Puerto Rico	0	0	0	0	0	1	0	1	3	0
WP: Takayama (3–0) LP: Martinez (0–2)

Team	1	2	3	4	5	6	7	8	9	10	R	H	E
United States	0	0	0	0	0	0	0	0	0	1	1	6	0
Australia	0	0	0	0	0	0	0	0	0	2	2	1	2
WP: Harding (2–0) LP: Fernandez (0–1)

Team	1	2	3	4	5	6	7	R	H	E
Netherlands	0	1	0	0	0	0	0	1	2	4
Canada	0	0	2	1	0	1	–	4	5	1
WP: Sippel (2–1) LP: Mels (0–4) Sv: Debbie Sonnenberg (1)

Team	1	2	3	4	5	6	7	R	H	E
China	0	0	1	0	0	0	0	1	5	2
Chinese Taipei	0	0	0	0	0	0	0	0	1	0
WP: Wang L (3–1) LP: Tu HM (1–2)

July 27

Team	1	2	3	4	5	6	7	R	H	E
Canada	0	0	0	2	0	0	0	2	4	0
Australia	2	0	0	0	3	0	–	5	9	3
WP: Roche (2–1) LP: Snelgrove (1–2)

Team	1	2	3	4	5	6	7	R	H	E
Netherlands	0	0	0	2	0	0	0	2	8	1
Puerto Rico	0	0	0	0	0	0	0	0	3	3
WP: Mels (1–4) LP: Echevarría (1–3)

Team	1	2	3	4	5	6	7	R	H	E
China	0	0	0	0	0	2	0	2	5	0
United States	0	1	0	0	0	2	–	3	8	1
WP: M Smith (2–0) LP: Wang L (3–2)

Team	1	2	3	4	5	6	7	R	H	E
Japan	0	0	1	0	2	2	0	5	10	0
Chinese Taipei	0	1	0	0	0	0	0	1	6	0
WP: Kobayashi (1–1) LP: Han (0–1)

== Medal round ==
The loser of the 1&2 seed game played the winner of the 3&4 seed game in the bronze medal match. The loser of the bronze medal match won the bronze medal, while the winner went on to play the winner of the 1&2 seed game for the gold medal in the gold medal match.

Semifinals
1	United States	1
2	China	0
3	Australia	3
4	Japan	0

Bronze medal game
2	China	4
3	Australia	2

Gold medal game
1	United States	3
2	China	1

=== Semifinals ===
Team	1	2	3	4	5	6	7	8	9	10	R	H	E
China	0	0	0	0	0	0	0	0	0	0	0	3	2
United States	0	0	0	0	0	0	0	0	0	1	1	10	0
WP: Fernandez (1-1) LP: Wang L (3-2)

Team	1	2	3	4	5	6	7	R	H	E
Australia	0	0	0	0	1	0	2	3	9	0
Japan	0	0	0	0	0	0	0	0	2	1
WP: Tanya Harding (3-0) LP: Takayama (3-1)

=== Bronze medal match ===
Winner advanced to gold medal match. Loser won bronze medal.

Team	1	2	3	4	5	6	7	R	H	E
China	0	1	0	1	1	0	1	4	5	2
Australia	0	2	0	2	0	0	0	2	2	2
WP: Wang L (4-2) LP: Roche (2-2)

=== Gold medal match ===
Team	1	2	3	4	5	6	7	R	H	E
China	0	0	0	0	0	1	0	1	4	2
United States	0	0	3	0	0	0	0	3	4	0
WP: Michele Granger (2-0) LP: Liu Y (0-1) Sv: Fernandez (1)

== Final team standings ==
Rank	Team	Games	Wins	Losses
Gold medal	United States	9	8	1
Silver medal	China	10	6	4
Bronze medal	Australia	9	6	3
4	Japan	8	5	3
5	Canada	7	3	4
6	Chinese Taipei	7	2	5
7	Netherlands	7	1	6
8	Puerto Rico	7	1	6
