= Softball at the Asian Games =

- Governing bodies: WBSC (World) / SA (Asia)
- Events: 1 (women)

Games
- 1951; 1954; 1958; 1962; 1966; 1970; 1974; 1978; 1982; 1986; 1990; 1994; 1998; 2002; 2006; 2010; 2014; 2018; 2022; 2026
- Medalists

Softball has been an event at the Asian Games since 1990 in Beijing, China. Softball is a sport similar to and derived from baseball, but played with a larger ball, on a smaller field. Women's softball was the female version of baseball played at the Games since women's baseball was not included on the program.

International softball in Asia is governed by the World Baseball Softball Confederation (WBSC) and the Softball Asia (SA).

The competition has been dominated by teams from Japan, China and Chinese Taipei (Taiwan). Japan is the most successful team by winning seven gold medals.

== Summary ==
Year	Host	Final			Third place match		
Year	Host	Winner	Score	Runner-up	3rd place	Score	4th place
1990	(China); Beijing	China	No playoffs	Japan	Chinese Taipei	No playoffs	South Korea
1994	(Japan); Hiroshima	China	No playoffs	Japan	Chinese Taipei	No playoffs	South Korea
1998	(Thailand); Bangkok	China	5–0	Japan	Chinese Taipei	No playoffs	North Korea
2002	(South Korea); Busan	Japan	Not held	China Chinese Taipei	Shared silver	No playoffs	North Korea
2006	(Qatar); Doha	Japan	7–0 (F/5)	Chinese Taipei	China	No playoffs	North Korea
2010	(China); Guangzhou	Japan	2–0	China	Chinese Taipei	No playoffs	South Korea
2014	(South Korea); Incheon	Japan	6–0	Chinese Taipei	China	No playoffs	Philippines
2018	(Indonesia); Jakarta–Palembang	Japan	7–0 (F/5)	Chinese Taipei	China	No playoffs	Philippines
2022	(China); Hangzhou	Japan	4–0	China	Chinese Taipei	3–2	Philippines
2026	(Japan); Aichi–Nagoya	Japan	7–0 (F/5)	China	Chinese Taipei	12–2 (F/4)	Philippines

== Medal table ==
Rank	Nation	Gold	Silver	Bronze	Total
1	Japan (JPN)	7	3	0	10
2	China (CHN)	3	4	3	10
3	Chinese Taipei (TPE)	0	4	6	10
Totals (3 entries)		10	11	9	30

== Participating nations ==
Team	(China) 1990	(Japan) 1994	(Thailand) 1998	(South Korea) 2002	(Qatar) 2006	(China) 2010	(South Korea) 2014	(Indonesia) 2018	(China) 2022	(Japan) 2026	Years
China	1st	1st	1st	2nd	3rd	2nd	3rd	3rd	2nd	2nd	10
Chinese Taipei	3rd	3rd	3rd	2nd	2nd	3rd	2nd	2nd	3rd	3rd	10
Hong Kong								7th	7th	6th	3
Indonesia								6th			1
Japan	2nd	2nd	2nd	1st	1st	1st	1st	1st	1st	1st	10
North Korea	5th		4th	4th	4th						4
Philippines			6th	6th		5th	4th	4th	4th	4th	7
Singapore									6th	7th	2
South Korea	4th	4th	5th	5th	5th	4th	5th	5th	5th	5th	10
Thailand			7th			6th	6th		8th	8th	5
Number of teams	5	4	7	6	5	6	6	7	8	8	
