= International Softball Federation =

Former international governing body for softball

International Softball Federation Federación Internacional de Softbol
- Formation: 1952; 74 years ago
- Type: Sports federation
- Headquarters: Plant City, Florida, United States
- Members: 127 National Governing Bodies
- Official language: English, Spanish
- President: Dale McMann
- Website: www.isfsoftball.org

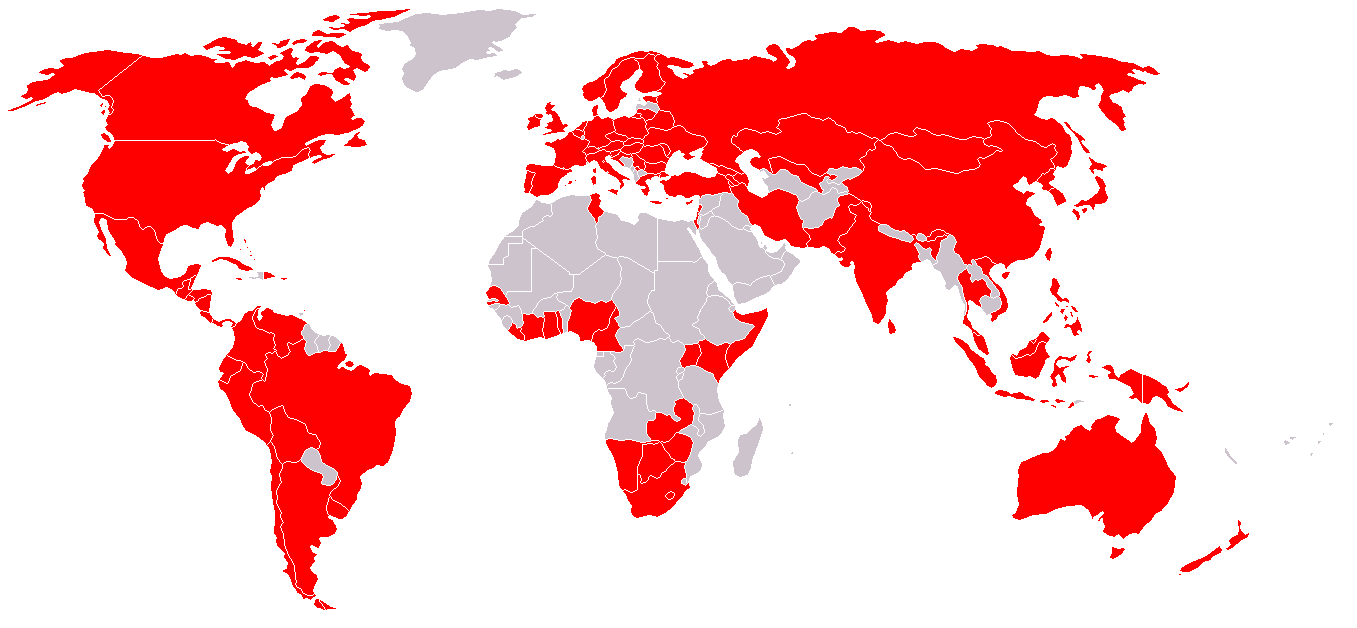
Map of member states.

The International Softball Federation (ISF) is the former international governing body for the sport of softball with its world headquarters and training centre at Plant City, Florida. The ISF is a non-profit corporation recognized by the International Olympic Committee (IOC) and SportAccord (formerly the General Association of International Sports Federations).

In 2013 a merger between the International Baseball Federation (IBAF) and International Softball Federation (ISF), the world governing bodies for baseball and softball, created the World Baseball Softball Confederation (WBSC) which now serves as the overarching world governing body for the sports of baseball, softball, and Baseball5. The ISF represents the softball division.

The ISF organizes and conducts world championship competition in women's & men's fast pitch, junior women's & junior men's fast pitch (19-and-under), women's, men's & coed slow pitch, and women's & men's modified pitch. The ISF sanctions regional championships and provides technical support to Regional (Multi-Sport) Games. Additionally the ISF qualifies teams for Olympic softball competition in coordination with the IOC. The ISF provides the official playing rules for international competition including: Olympic Games, world championships, regional championships, regional games and other sanctioned competitions.

As part of a campaign to return softball to the Olympic Games in time for 2020, in April 2013, the ISF began a process of merging with the International Baseball Federation to form a new combined federation for both sports, the World Baseball Softball Confederation (WBSC).

== Hall of Fame ==
For a list of inductees and their biographical sketches, see footnote The ISF Hall of Fame has inducted members every other year since 1981. Inductees include players, coaches, umpires, and administrators (plus individuals in the Meritorious Service category). Individuals are nominated by the national governing body for softball in their country. Nominees are considered by the ISF Hall of Fame Commission. Voting is conducted at the biennial ISF congress. The ISF is planning to build an ISF Hall of Fame & Museum at its world headquarters in Plant City, Florida, USA.

== Medal of Honor ==
For a list of recipients, see footnote The ISF Medal of Honor was first awarded in 1990.

== List of members ==
The ISF considers some dependent territories, such as the British Virgin Islands, to be "countries" for the purposes of international competition. Those dependent territories compete separately from their "parent" country. There are members from every continent in the world, except Antarctica.

The national governing body for softball in each of the countries listed below is considered to be a member of the ISF.

=== Africa ===
There are 18 member countries.

- Botswana
- Burkina Faso
- Cameroon
- Gambia
- Guinea
- Guinea-Bissau
- Kenya
- Lesotho
- Liberia
- Mali
- Namibia
- Nigeria
- Senegal
- Sierra Leone
- South Africa
- Uganda
- Zambia
- Zimbabwe

=== Americas ===
There are 33 countries and dependent territories.

- Anguilla
- Antigua and Barbuda
- Argentina
- Aruba
- Bahamas
- Barbados
- Belize
- Bermuda
- Bolivia
- Brazil
- British Virgin Islands
- Canada
- Cayman Islands
- Colombia
- Costa Rica
- Cuba
- Dominican Republic
- Ecuador
- El Salvador
- Guatemala
- Honduras
- Jamaica
- Mexico
- Netherlands Antilles
- Nicaragua
- Panama
- Peru
- Puerto Rico
- Turks and Caicos Islands
- United States
- Uruguay
- Venezuela
- U.S. Virgin Islands. (The ISF calls them the Virgin Islands)

=== Asia ===
There are 22 member countries and dependent territories.

- Brunei
- Cambodia
- China
- Hong Kong
- India
- Indonesia
- Iran
- Iraq
- Laos
- Japan
- Jordan
- Kazakhstan
- North Korea
- South Korea
- Malaysia
- Mongolia
- Nepal
- Pakistan
- Philippines
- Singapore
- Chinese Taipei (Taiwan)
- Thailand
- Uzbekistan
- Vietnam

=== Europe ===
There are 39 countries and dependent territories.

- Armenia
- Austria
- Azerbaijan
- Belarus Site
- Belgium
- Bulgaria
- Croatia
- Cyprus
- Czech Republic
- Denmark
- Estonia
- Finland
- France
- Georgia
- Germany
- Great Britain
- Greece
- Guernsey
- Hungary
- Ireland
- Israel
- Italy
- Kosovo
- Lithuania
- Malta
- Moldova
- Netherlands
- Norway
- Poland
- Romania
- Russia
- San Marino
- Serbia
- Slovakia
- Slovenia
- Spain
- Sweden
- Switzerland
- Turkey
- Ukraine

=== Oceania ===
There are 12 member countries and dependent territories.

- American Samoa
- Australia
- Cook Islands
- Guam
- Northern Mariana Islands (Mariana Islands)
- Marshall Islands
- Federated States of Micronesia
- New Zealand
- Palau
- Papua New Guinea
- Samoa
- Solomon Islands

== See also ==
- World Baseball Softball Confederation
