= Softball at the 2020 Summer Olympics – Qualification =

Six teams qualified for the Olympic softball tournament, including Japan, which, as host nation, qualified automatically. The United States team won the 2018 Women's Softball World Championship to qualify for the Olympics. The remaining four spots were allocated through three qualification tournaments: one spot for a Europe/Africa tournament, one spot for an Asia/Oceania tournament, and two spots for an Americas tournament.

== Table ==
Event	Date	Location	Quotas	Qualified
Host nation	—N/a	—N/a	1	Japan
2018 Women's Softball World Championship	2–12 August 2018	(Japan) Chiba	1	United States
Africa/Europe Qualifying Event	23–27 July 2019	(Netherlands) Utrecht	1	Italy
Americas Qualifying Event	25 August – 1 September 2019	(Canada) Surrey	2	Mexico; Canada
Asia/Oceania Qualifying Event	24–29 September 2019	(China) Shanghai	1	Australia
Total			6	

== 2018 Women's Softball World Championship ==
The World Championships featured 16 teams, with the winner earning an Olympic qualification spot (awarded to the runner-up instead if Japan wins). The United States advanced to the final against already qualified host Japan, securing Olympic qualification.

=== Qualified teams ===
Origin	Berths	Qualified
Host nation	1	Japan
Oceania	2	Australia; New Zealand
Europe	3	Netherlands; Italy; Great Britain
Americas	5	Canada; Mexico; Puerto Rico; United States; Venezuela
Asia	3	Philippines; Chinese Taipei; China
Africa	2	Botswana; South Africa

==== Group stage ====
Group A

Teams	W	L	Pct.	GB
United States	7	0	1.000	–
Puerto Rico	6	1	.857	1
Mexico	5	2	.714	2
Netherlands	3	4	.429	4
Chinese Taipei	3	4	.429	4
New Zealand	2	5	.286	5
Philippines	2	5	.286	5
South Africa	0	7	.000	7

Group B

Teams	W	L	Pct.	GB
Japan	7	0	1.000	–
Australia	5	2	.714	2
Canada	5	2	.714	2
Italy	4	3	.571	3
China	4	3	.571	3
Great Britain	2	5	.286	5
Venezuela	1	6	.143	6
Botswana	0	7	.000	7

==== Final round ====
10 August 2018	Mexico	1–0 (9)	Italy	ZOZO Marine Stadium, Chiba

10 August 2018	Canada	8–1 (5)	Netherlands	ZOZO Marine Stadium, Chiba

10 August 2018	United States	3–1	Australia	ZOZO Marine Stadium, Chiba

10 August 2018	Japan	7–0 (6)	Puerto Rico	ZOZO Marine Stadium, Chiba

11 August 2018	Australia	2–1 (8)	Mexico	ZOZO Marine Stadium, Chiba

11 August 2018	Puerto Rico	4–10	Canada	ZOZO Marine Stadium, Chiba

=== Medal Round ===
Semi-finals
W3	United States	4^{(8)}
W4	Japan	3
W5	Australia	0^{(4)}
W6	Canada	12

Bronze Medal
L8	Japan	3
W7	Canada	0

Gold Medal
W8	United States	7^{(10)}
W9	Japan	6

== Africa/Europe Qualifying Event ==
One quota spot was awarded at a combined continental qualifying tournament for Africa and Europe to be held from 23 to 27 July 2019. The tournament featured eight teams: the top six from the 2019 ESF Women's Championship and the top two from the 2019 Softball Africa Cup. Teams were split into two groups with winners and runners up advancing into Super Round. The draw was held in WBSC headquarters in Lausanne, Switzerland 10 July 2019.

Qualified teams

Origin	Berths	Date	Place	Qualified
Europe	6	6 July 2019	2019 ESF Women's Championship	Netherlands; Great Britain; Czech Republic; Italy; Spain; France
Africa	2	12 May 2019	2019 Softball Africa Cup	Botswana; South Africa

=== Pre-Qualification ===
==== 2019 ESF Women's Championship ====
The 2019 European championship was held from 30 June to 6 July 2019.

Participants

- Belgium
- Czech Republic
- France
- Lithuania
- Slovakia
- Sweden
- Austria
- Israel
- Italy
- Spain
- Turkey
- Ukraine
- Denmark
- Hungary
- Ireland
- Netherlands
- Poland
- Russia
- Croatia
- Germany
- Great Britain
- Greece
- Switzerland

Final standings

#	Teams	Record	
Gold medal	Italy	11–1	Qualified for Africa/Europe 2020 Olympic Qualification.
Silver medal	Netherlands	11–1	Qualified for Africa/Europe 2020 Olympic Qualification.
Bronze medal	Great Britain	9–2	Qualified for Africa/Europe 2020 Olympic Qualification.
4	Czech Republic	8–4	Qualified for Africa/Europe 2020 Olympic Qualification.
5	Spain	6–5	Qualified for Africa/Europe 2020 Olympic Qualification.
6	France	5–6	Qualified for Africa/Europe 2020 Olympic Qualification.
Failed To Qualify to Final Round
7	Greece	4–4	
8	Ireland	4–5	
Eliminated in preliminary round
9	Israel	7–2	
10	Germany	3–3	
11	Russia	6–3	
12	Poland	4–5	
13	Austria	5–4	
14	Belgium	4–5	
15	Sweden	3–6	
16	Switzerland	1–7	
Eliminated in preliminary round
17	Croatia	6–4	
18	Ukraine	5–5	
19	Slovakia	4–6	
20	Denmark	3–7	
21	Lithuania	2–8	
22	Hungary	1–9	
23	Turkey	0–10	

==== 2019 Softball Africa Cup ====
The 2019 Softball Africa Cup was held from 9 to 12 May 2019 in South Africa.

Participants

- Botswana
- Kenya
- Lesotho
- Nigeria
- South Africa
- Tanzania
- Uganda
- Zimbabwe

Final standings

#	Teams	
1	Botswana	Qualified for Africa/Europe 2020 Olympic Qualification
2	South Africa	Qualified for Africa/Europe 2020 Olympic Qualification
3	Uganda	
4	Nigeria	
??	Lesotho	
??	Tanzania	
??	Kenya	
??	Zimbabwe	

=== Final Africa-Europe Qualifier ===
Group A

Team	Pld	W	L	AVG	
Great Britain	3	3	0	1.000	Qualified for super round
Netherlands (H) (seeded)	3	2	1	.667	Qualified for super round
Spain	3	1	2	.333	
South Africa	3	0	3	.000	

23 July 2019	Great Britain	9–2 (6)	Spain	Sportpark de Paperclip, Utrecht; Attendance: 100
23 July 2019		Boxscore		Sportpark de Paperclip, Utrecht; Attendance: 100

23 July 2019	Netherlands	11–1 (4)	South Africa	Sportpark de Paperclip, Utrecht; Attendance: 1,900
23 July 2019		Boxscore		Sportpark de Paperclip, Utrecht; Attendance: 1,900

24 July 2019	Great Britain	15–0 (3)	South Africa	Sportpark de Paperclip, Utrecht; Attendance: 138
24 July 2019		Boxscore		Sportpark de Paperclip, Utrecht; Attendance: 138

24 July 2019	Netherlands	7–0 (5)	Spain	Sportpark de Paperclip, Utrecht; Attendance: 1,900
24 July 2019		Boxscore		Sportpark de Paperclip, Utrecht; Attendance: 1,900

25 July 2019	South Africa	0–5	Spain	Sportpark de Paperclip, Utrecht; Attendance: 94
25 July 2019		Boxscore		Sportpark de Paperclip, Utrecht; Attendance: 94

25 July 2019	Netherlands	2–5	Great Britain	Sportpark de Paperclip, Utrecht; Attendance: 1,807
25 July 2019		Boxscore		Sportpark de Paperclip, Utrecht; Attendance: 1,807

Group B

Team	Pld	W	L	AVG	
Italy (seeded)	3	3	0	1.000	Qualified for super round
Czech Republic	3	2	1	.666	Qualified for super round
France	3	1	2	.333	
Botswana	3	0	3	.000	

23 July 2019	Italy	7–0 (5)	Botswana	Sportpark de Paperclip, Utrecht; Attendance: 250
23 July 2019		Boxscore		Sportpark de Paperclip, Utrecht; Attendance: 250

23 July 2019	Czech Republic	6–1	France	Sportpark de Paperclip, Utrecht; Attendance: 300
23 July 2019		Boxscore		Sportpark de Paperclip, Utrecht; Attendance: 300

24 July 2019	Botswana	2–11 (5)	France	Sportpark de Paperclip, Utrecht; Attendance: 92
24 July 2019		Boxscore		Sportpark de Paperclip, Utrecht; Attendance: 92

24 July 2019	Italy	2–0	Czech Republic	Sportpark de Paperclip, Utrecht; Attendance: 500
24 July 2019		Boxscore		Sportpark de Paperclip, Utrecht; Attendance: 500

25 July 2019	France	1–5	Italy	Sportpark de Paperclip, Utrecht; Attendance: 63
25 July 2019		Boxscore		Sportpark de Paperclip, Utrecht; Attendance: 63

25 July 2019	Czech Republic	12–0 (4)	Botswana	Sportpark de Paperclip, Utrecht; Attendance: 140
25 July 2019		Boxscore		Sportpark de Paperclip, Utrecht; Attendance: 140

==== Super Round ====
Team	Pld	W	L	AVG	
Italy	3	3	0	1.000	Qualified for 2020 Olympics
Great Britain	3	2	1	.667	
Netherlands	3	1	2	.333	
Czech Republic	3	0	3	.000	

26 July 2019	Czech Republic	2–4	Great Britain	Sportpark de Paperclip, Utrecht
26 July 2019		Boxscore		Sportpark de Paperclip, Utrecht

26 July 2019	Netherlands	4–7	Italy	Sportpark de Paperclip, Utrecht
26 July 2019		Boxscore		Sportpark de Paperclip, Utrecht

27 July 2019	Netherlands	7–0 (5)	Czech Republic	Sportpark de Paperclip, Utrecht
27 July 2019		Boxscore		Sportpark de Paperclip, Utrecht

27 July 2019	Great Britain	0–5	Italy	Sportpark de Paperclip, Utrecht
27 July 2019		Boxscore		Sportpark de Paperclip, Utrecht

==== Final standings ====
#	Teams	Record	
1	Italy	5–0	Qualified for 2020 Olympics
2	Great Britain	4–1	
3	Netherlands	3–2	
4	Czech Republic	2–3	
5	France	1–2	Failed To Qualify to Super Round
6	Spain	1–2	Failed To Qualify to Super Round
7	South Africa	0–3	Failed To Qualify to Super Round
8	Botswana	0–3	Failed To Qualify to Super Round

== Asia/Oceania Qualifying Event ==
One quota spot was awarded at a combined continental qualifying tournament for Asia and Oceania to be held from 24to 29 September 2019 in Shanghai, China. The tournament will feature eight teams: the top six from the Asian Softball Championship 2019 and the top two from the Oceania Softball Championship 2019. Teams were split into two groups with top two advancing into Super Round. Draw was held in WBSC headquarters in Lausanne, Switzerland 10 July 2019.

Qualified teams
Asian Softball Championship 2019

- China (hosts)
- Chinese Taipei
- Philippines
- South Korea
- Indonesia
- Hong Kong

Oceania Softball Championship 2019

- Australia
- New Zealand

=== Final Oceania-Asia Qualifier ===
Group A

Team	Pld	W	L	AVG	
China (H) (seeded)	3	3	0	1.000	Qualified for super round
Philippines	3	2	1	0.667	Qualified for super round
New Zealand	3	1	2	0.333	
South Korea	3	0	3	0.000	

24 September 2019	New Zealand	3–8	China

24 September 2019	Philippines	10 – 1 (6)	South Korea

25 September 2019	South Korea	1–5	New Zealand

25 September 2019	China	8–3	Philippines

26 September 2019	Philippines	1 – 0 (8)	New Zealand

26 September 2019	China	2–1	South Korea

Group B

Team	Pld	W	L	AVG	
Australia	3	3	0	1.000	Qualified for super round
Chinese Taipei (seeded)	3	2	1	0.667	Qualified for super round
Hong Kong	3	1	2	0.333	
Indonesia	3	0	3	0.000	

24 September 2019	Indonesia	5 – 6 (8)	Hong Kong

24 September 2019	Australia	5–1	Chinese Taipei

25 September 2019	Indonesia	0 – 8 (5)	Australia

25 September 2019	Chinese Taipei	0 – 7 (5)	Hong Kong

26 September 2019	Chinese Taipei	13 – 0 (6)	Indonesia

26 September 2019	Hong Kong	0 – 8 (5)	Australia

==== Super Round ====
Team	Pld	W	L	AVG	
Australia	3	3	0	1.000	Qualified for 2020 Olympics
Chinese Taipei	3	2	1	0.667	
China	3	1	2	0.333	
Philippines	3	0	3	0.000	

27 September 2019	Chinese Taipei	9–3	China

27 September 2019	Philippines	0 – 7 (6)	Australia

28 September 2019	Philippines	0–5	Chinese Taipei

28 September 2019	China	3–9	Australia

==== Final standings ====
#	Teams	Record	
1	Australia	5–0	Qualified for 2020 Olympics
2	Chinese Taipei	4–1	
3	China	3–2	
4	Philippines	2–3	
5	New Zealand	1–2	Failed To Qualify to Super Round
6	Hong Kong	1–2	Failed To Qualify to Super Round
7	South Korea	0–3	Failed To Qualify to Super Round
8	Indonesia	0–3	Failed To Qualify to Super Round

== Americas Qualifying Event ==
Two quota spots were allocated to the winner and runner-up of the Americas Qualifying Event to be held from 25 August to 1 September 2019 in Surrey, British Columbia, Canada. Tournament consisted of 12 teams split into two groups. Top three teams advanced to Super Round. Winner and runner-up of Super Round qualified for the Olympics. Qualification for the event was determined by placing in the 2019 Pan American Championship. The draw was held 29 April in WBSC headquarters in Lausanne, Switzerland. Argentina and British Virgin Island withdrew from the competition.

Participants

- Argentina (withdrew)
- Bahamas
- Brazil
- Canada (H) (seeded)
- Cuba
- Dominican Republic
- Guatemala
- British Virgin Islands (withdrew)
- Mexico (seeded)
- Peru
- Puerto Rico (seeded)
- Venezuela (seeded)

=== Group stage ===
Group A

#	Team	Pld	W	L	AVG	
1	Canada (H,Q) (seeded)	5	5	0	1.000	Qualified for super round
2	Puerto Rico (Q) (seeded)	5	4	1	0.800	Qualified for super round
3	Cuba (Q)	5	3	2	0.600	Qualified for super round
4	Guatemala	5	2	3	0.400	
5	Bahamas	5	1	4	0.200	
	Argentina	5	0	5	0.000	withdrew

25 August 2019	Argentina	0–7 FF	Puerto Rico

25 August 2019	Guatemala	9–4	Bahamas	Field 2 Attendance: 200
25 August 2019		Boxscore		Field 2 Attendance: 200

25 August 2019	Cuba	0–17 (3)	Canada	Field 1 Attendance: 237
25 August 2019		Boxscore		Field 1 Attendance: 237

26 August 2019	Argentina	0–7 FF	Canada

26 August 2019	Puerto Rico	13–0 (5)	Guatemala	Field 2 Attendance: 250
26 August 2019		Boxscore		Field 2 Attendance: 250

26 August 2019	Bahamas	0–13 (4)	Cuba	Field 1 Attendance: 660
26 August 2019		Boxscore		Field 1 Attendance: 660

27 August 2019	Argentina	0–7 FF	Cuba

27 August 2019	Canada	19–0 (4)	Guatemala	Field 1 Attendance: 1,550
27 August 2019		Boxscore		Field 1 Attendance: 1,550

27 August 2019	Puerto Rico	13–0 (4)	Bahamas	Field 1 Attendance: 165
27 August 2019		Boxscore		Field 1 Attendance: 165

28 August 2019	Bahamas	7–0 FF	Argentina

28 August 2019	Cuba	15–0	Guatemala	Field 1 Attendance: 190
28 August 2019		Boxscore		Field 1 Attendance: 190

28 August 2019	Puerto Rico	0–3	Canada	Field 1 Attendance: 3,300
28 August 2019		Boxscore		Field 1 Attendance: 3,300

29 August 2019	Guatemala	7–0 FF	Argentina
29 August 2019		Boxscore

29 August 2019	Cuba	0–10 (4)	Puerto Rico	Field 1 Attendance: 200
29 August 2019		Boxscore		Field 1 Attendance: 200

29 August 2019	Canada	18–0 (4)	Bahamas	Field 1 Attendance: 606
29 August 2019		Boxscore		Field 1 Attendance: 606

Group B

	Team	Pld	W	L	AVG	
1	Mexico (Q) (seeded)	5	5	0	1.000	Qualified for super round
2	Brazil (Q)	5	4	1	0.800	Qualified for super round
3	Venezuela (Q) (seeded)	5	3	2	0.600	Qualified for super round
4	Peru	5	2	3	0.400	
5	Dominican Republic	5	1	4	0.200	
	British Virgin Islands	5	0	5	0.000	withdrew

25 August 2019	British Virgin Islands	0–7 FF	Brazil

25 August 2019	Peru	0–8 (5)	Mexico	Field 1 Attendance: 150
25 August 2019		Boxscore		Field 1 Attendance: 150

25 August 2019	Dominican Republic	3–7	Venezuela	Field 1 Attendance: 250
25 August 2019		Boxscore		Field 1 Attendance: 250

26 August 2019	Venezuela	7–0 FF	British Virgin Islands

26 August 2019	Brazil	5–0	Peru	Field 1 Attendance: 541
26 August 2019		Boxscore		Field 1 Attendance: 541

26 August 2019	Dominican Republic	1–9 (5)	Mexico	Field 1 Attendance: 315
26 August 2019		Boxscore		Field 1 Attendance: 315

27 August 2019	Mexico	7–0 FF	British Virgin Islands

27 August 2019	Venezuela	1–2	Brazil	Field 1 Attendance: 200
27 August 2019		Boxscore		Field 1 Attendance: 200

27 August 2019	Dominican Republic	1–6	Peru	Field 2 Attendance: 0
27 August 2019		Boxscore		Field 2 Attendance: 0

28 August 2019	Peru	7–0 FF	British Virgin Islands

28 August 2019	Brazil	4–3	Dominican Republic	Field 2 Attendance: 400
28 August 2019		Boxscore		Field 2 Attendance: 400

28 August 2019	Venezuela	0–7 (5)	Mexico	Field 1 Attendance: 600
28 August 2019		Boxscore		Field 1 Attendance: 600

29 August 2019	British Virgin Islands	0–7 FF	Dominican Republic
29 August 2019		Boxscore

29 August 2019	Peru	0–1	Venezuela	Field 2 Attendance: 200
29 August 2019		Boxscore		Field 2 Attendance: 200

29 August 2019	Mexico	10–0 (4)	Brazil	Field 1 Attendance: 170
29 August 2019		Boxscore		Field 1 Attendance: 170

Placement round

Teams failing to reach the Super Round play in Placement matches. The game between the 6th placed teams was cancelled due to Argentina and British Virgin Island withdrawing from the competition.
9th place Game

30 August 2019	Bahamas	0–16 (3)	Dominican Republic	field 2 Attendance: 55
30 August 2019		Boxscore		field 2 Attendance: 55

7th place Game

30 August 2019	Guatemala	6–0	Peru	field 2 Attendance: 210
30 August 2019		Boxscore		field 2 Attendance: 210

=== Super Round ===
Team	Pld	W	L	AVG	
Mexico (Q)	5	5	0	1.000	Qualified for 2020 Olympics
Canada (Q)	5	4	1	0.800	Qualified for 2020 Olympics
Puerto Rico (E)	5	3	2	0.600	
Brazil (E)	5	2	3	0.400	
Cuba (E)	5	1	4	0.200	
Venezuela (E)	5	0	5	0	

30 August 2019	Puerto Rico	0–2	Mexico	Field 1 Attendance: 454
30 August 2019		Boxscore		Field 1 Attendance: 454

30 August 2019	Venezuela	0–11 (4)	Canada	Field 1 Attendance: 770
30 August 2019		Boxscore		Field 1 Attendance: 770

30 August 2019	Cuba	5–6 (9)	Brazil	Field 1 Attendance: 255
30 August 2019		Boxscore		Field 1 Attendance: 255

31 August 2019	Canada	1–2	Mexico	Field 1 Attendance: 3,961
31 August 2019		Boxscore		Field 1 Attendance: 3,961

31 August 2019	Venezuela	1–2	Cuba	Field 1 Attendance: 450
31 August 2019		Boxscore		Field 1 Attendance: 450

31 August 2019	Puerto Rico	7–0 (5)	Brazil	Field 1 Attendance: 427
31 August 2019		Boxscore		Field 1 Attendance: 427

1 September 2019	Cuba	0–7 (5)	Mexico	Field 1

1 September 2019	Venezuela	1–4	Puerto Rico	Field 1

1 September 2019	Brazil	0–7 (5)	Canada	Field 1

=== Final standings ===
#	Teams	Record	
1	Mexico	7–0	Qualified for 2020 Olympics
2	Canada	6–1	Qualified for 2020 Olympics
3	Puerto Rico	5–2	
4	Brazil	4–3	
5	Cuba	3–4	
6	Venezuela	2–5	
Failed To Qualify to Super Round
7	Peru	3–3	
8	Guatemala	2–4	
9	Dominican Republic	2–4	
10	Bahamas	1–5	
Withdrew prior Tournament
	British Virgin Islands		
	Argentina		

== See also ==
- Baseball at the 2020 Summer Olympics – Qualification
