= Women's Softball Asia Cup =

- Sport: Softball
- Founded: 1967
- Continent: Asia
- Most recent champion: Japan (9th title)
- Most titles: Japan (9th title)

The Women's Softball Asia Cup, formerly the Asian Women's Softball Championship is the main championship tournament between national women's softball teams in Asia, governed by the Softball Confederation of Asia (WBSC Asia).

== Medal table ==
As of 2025 Asian Women's Softball Championship.

Rank	Nation	Gold	Silver	Bronze	Total
1	Japan	9	4	1	14
2	China	4	3	3	10
3	Philippines	1	3	0	4
4	Chinese Taipei	0	4	9	13
5	North Korea	0	0	1	1
Totals (5 entries)		14	14	14	42

== Results ==
#	Year	Host	Final		Semifinalists		Teams
#	Year	Host	Champions	Runners-up	3rd place	4th place	Teams
1	1967	(Philippines); Manila	Japan	Philippines	Taiwan	Hong Kong	4
2	1969	(Taiwan); Taipei	Japan	Philippines	Taiwan	Only 3 Teams	3
3	1972	(Philippines); Manila	Philippines	Japan	Taiwan	Only 3 Teams	3
4	1987	(Japan); Kochi	China	Japan	Chinese Taipei	Philippines	6
5	1991	(Indonesia); Jakarta	China	Chinese Taipei	Japan	Philippines	12
6	1995	(Philippines); Manila	China	Japan	Chinese Taipei	Philippines	11
7	1999	(China); Shanghai	China	Japan	North Korea	South Korea	10
8	2004	(Philippines); Manila	Japan	Chinese Taipei	China	North Korea	12
9	2007	(Indonesia); Jakarta	Japan	Chinese Taipei	China	Philippines	10
10	2011	(Taiwan); Nantou	Japan	Chinese Taipei	China	Philippines	13
11	2017	(Taiwan); Taichung	Japan	Philippines	Chinese Taipei	China	12
12	2019	(Indonesia); Jakarta	Japan	China	Chinese Taipei	Philippines	10
13	2023	(South Korea); Incheon	Japan	China	Chinese Taipei	Philippines	9
14	2025	(China); Xi’an	Japan	China	Chinese Taipei	Philippines	10

== Teams ==
Year	1967	1969	1972	1987	1991	1995	1999	2004	2007	2011	2017	2019	2023	2025	Total
China				1st	1st	1st	1st	3rd	3rd	3rd	4th	2nd	2nd	2nd	11
Chinese Taipei	3rd	3rd	3rd	3rd	2nd	3rd	??	2nd	2nd	2nd	3rd	3rd	3rd	3rd	14
Hong Kong	4th			6th	9th	??	??	10th	9th	11th	6th	7th	6th	6th	12
India					12th	??	??	12th		10th	9th	10th	9th	9th	9
Indonesia					5th			7th	5th	8th	7th	6th			6
Iran											11th				1
Iraq										13th					1
Japan	1st	1st	2nd	2nd	3rd	2nd	2nd	1st	1st	1st	1st	1st	1st	1st	14
Malaysia					10th	??		11th	10th					10th	5
North Korea					6th		3rd	4th		6th					4
Pakistan						??				12th	11th				3
Philippines	2nd	2nd	1st	4th	4th	4th	??	5	4th	4th	2nd	4th	4th	4th	14
South Korea					8th	??	4th	6th	5th	5th	5th	5th	5th	5th	10
Singapore				5th	7th	6th	??	8th	7th	7th	7th	9th	7th	7th	11
Thailand					11th	??	??	9th	7th	9th	9th	8th	8th	8th	10
Total	3	3	3	6	12	11	10	12	10	13	12	10	9	10	

== See also ==
- U-15 Women Softball Asia Cup
- Asian Men's Softball Championship
- Women's Baseball Asian Cup
- Asian Baseball Championship

== Links ==
- https://asiasoftball.com/reports/
