= 2011 Asian Women's Softball Championship =

Tournament details
- Host country: Taiwan
- Dates: 20–28 September 2011
- Teams: 13
- Defending champions: Japan

Final positions
- Champions: Japan (5th title)
- Runner-up: Chinese Taipei
- Third place: China
- Fourth place: Philippines

The 2011 Asian Women's Softball Championship was an international softball tournament which featured thirteen nations which was held from 20 to 28 September 2011 in Nantou County, Taiwan. Matches were held at the De-Hsin Baseball Stadium and Chao-Kuan Baseball Stadium. The top three teams qualified for the 2012 Women's Softball World Championship.

== Participants ==
- China
- Hong Kong
- Indonesia
- India
- Iraq
- Japan
- South Korea
- North Korea
- Pakistan
- Philippines
- Singapore
- Thailand
- Chinese Taipei (hosts)

Source: Nantou County Government

== Final ranking ==
1. Japan
2. Chinese Taipei
3. China
4. Philippines
5. South Korea
6. North Korea
7. Singapore
8. Indonesia

Source:Softball Confederation of Asia

== See also ==
- List of sporting events in Taiwan
