= WBSC Asia =

Asian sports governing body

- Type: Sport organization
- Headquarters: Xinyi, Taipei, Taiwan
- Region served: Asia
- Members: 24 member associations
- President: Jeffrey Jr. Koo (BFA); Beng Choo Low (SA)
- Parent organization: World Baseball Softball Confederation
- Website: www.wbscasia.org

WBSC Asia, cooperated with the Baseball Federation of Asia (BFA) and Softball Asia (SA), is the governing body of the sport of baseball and softball in Asia. The federation is governed by the World Baseball Softball Confederation.

== History ==
Former logo of the BFA, now known as WBSC Asia

The birth of Baseball Federation of Asia goes back to 1954 when the 2nd Asian Games was held in Manila, Philippines.

The four countries of Korea, Japan, Taiwan and the Philippines organized a committee aiming at establishing the Baseball Federation of Asia and 7 May of the same year witnessed the commencement of BFA.

American expatriate Charles "Chick" Parsons of the Philippines was elected as the first president of the Baseball Federation of Asia.

The BFA became inactive for eight years following the 1975 Asian Baseball Championship. At the sidelines of the FEMBA World Baseball Championship in Tokyo in 1980, the executives of BFA discussed about resuming the activity of the federation. The Asian Baseball Championship was later resumed in 1983 which was held in Seoul. The membership of the federation grew as more Asian nations were admitted to the BFA.

The total number of BFA members at the present time is 24 and 1 non-member observer State (Vietnam).

== Members ==
=== Baseball ===
Code	Association	National teams	Founded	Membership	IOC member	Note
AFG	Afghanistan	(M, W)	2011	Full	Yes	
BAN	Bangladesh	(M, W)	2006	Full	Yes	
BHU	Bhutan	(M, W)	2013	Full	Yes	
BRU	Brunei	(M, W)	1983	Full	Yes	
CAM	Cambodia	(M, W)	2005	Full	Yes	
CHN	China	(M, W)	1979	Full	Yes	
HKG	Hong Kong, China	(M, W)	1993	Full	Yes	
IND	India	(M, W)	1983	Full	Yes	
INA	Indonesia	(M, W)	1968	Full	Yes	
IRI	Iran	(M, W)	1989	Full	Yes	
IRQ	Iraq	(M, W)	2004	Full	Yes	
JOR	Jordan	(M, W)	2024	Full	Yes	
JPN	Japan	(M, W)	1990	Full	Yes	
LAO	Laos	(M, W)	2017	Full	Yes	
MAS	Malaysia	(M, W)	2004	Full	Yes	
MGL	Mongolia	(M, W)	1991	Full	Yes	
MYA	Myanmar	(M, W)	2005	Full	Yes	
NEP	Nepal	(M, W)	2009	Full	Yes	
PRK	North Korea	(M, W)	1987	Full	Yes	
PAK	Pakistan	(M, W)	1992	Full	Yes	
PLE	Palestine	(M, W)	2017	Full	Yes	
PHI	Philippines	(M, W)	1954	Full	Yes	
KSA	Saudi Arabia	(M, W)	2019	Full	Yes	
SGP	Singapore	(M, W)	1960	Full	Yes	
KOR	South Korea	(M, W)	1946	Full	Yes	
SRI	Sri Lanka	(M, W)	1985	Full	Yes	
TPE	Chinese Taipei	(M, W)	1973	Full	Yes	
THA	Thailand	(M, W)	1992	Full	Yes	
VIE	Vietnam	(M, W)	2021	Full	Yes	

=== Softball ===
Code	Association	National teams	Founded	Membership	IOC member	Note
BAN	Bangladesh	(M, W)	2006	Full	Yes	
BHU	Bhutan	(M, W)	2013	Full	Yes	
BRU	Brunei	(M, W)	1983	Full	Yes	
CAM	Cambodia	(M, W)	2022	Full	Yes	
CHN	China	(M, W)	1979	Full	Yes	
HKG	Hong Kong, China	(M, W)	1937	Full	Yes	
IND	India	(M, W)	1967	Full	Yes	
INA	Indonesia	(M, W)	1968	Full	Yes	
IRI	Iran	(M, W)	1989	Full	Yes	
IRQ	Iraq	(M, W)	2004	Full	Yes	
JPN	Japan	(M, W)	1949	Full	Yes	
JOR	Jordan	(M, W)	2024	Full	Yes	
LAO	Laos	(M, W)	2018	Full	Yes	
MAS	Malaysia	(M, W)	1974	Full	Yes	
MGL	Mongolia	(M, W)	1991	Full	Yes	
NEP	Nepal	(M, W)	2009	Full	Yes	
PRK	North Korea	(M, W)	1987	Full	Yes	
PAK	Pakistan	(M, W)	1992	Full	Yes	
PLE	Palestine	(M, W)	2017	Full	Yes	
PHI	Philippines	(M, W)	2011	Full	Yes	
KSA	Saudi Arabia	(M, W)	2019	Full	Yes	
SGP	Singapore	(M, W)	1960	Full	Yes	
KOR	South Korea	(M, W)	1946	Full	Yes	
TPE	Chinese Taipei	(M, W)	1973	Full	Yes	
THA	Thailand	(M, W)	1966	Full	Yes	

== WBSC World Rankings ==
=== Baseball ===
WBSC Men's Rankings (as of 18 November 2026)
Asia*	WBSC	+/-	National Team	Points
1	1	Steady	Japan	6149
2	2	Steady	Chinese Taipei	5252
3	5	▼1	South Korea	4057
4	19	Steady	China	879
5	25	Steady	Philippines	448
6	28	▲4	Hong Kong	245
7	31	▼2	Thailand	213
8	32	▼2	Palestine	212
9	42	Steady	Pakistan	101
10	48	Steady	Singapore	73
11	53	Steady	Sri Lanka	55
12	56	▲1	Laos	43
13	69	Steady	India	19
14	71	Steady	Vietnam	17
15	77	Steady	Bangladesh	9
16	82	Steady	Afghanistan	4
*Local rankings based on WBSC ranking points

WBSC Women's Rankings (as of 9 September 2026)
Asia*	WBSC	+/-	National Team	Points
1	1	Steady	Japan	2075
2	5	▲1	Chinese Taipei	1234
3	8	▲4	South Korea	689
4	9	▼1	Hong Kong	605
5	11	▲10	Philippines	516
6	13	▼2	Indonesia	333
7	14	▼1	India	301
8	16	▲3	China	247
9	17	▼1	Thailand	214
10	18	▼1	Pakistan	207
11	20	Steady	Sri Lanka	141
12	21	▲1	Sri Lanka	124
13	23	Steady	Malaysia	104
14	24	Steady	Cambodia	37
15	27	Steady	Iran	16
*Local rankings based on WBSC ranking points

=== Softball ===
WBSC Men's Softball Rankings (as of 14 May 2026)
Asia*	WBSC	+/-	National Team	Points
1	1	Steady	Japan	3128
2	11	▼1	Singapore	980
3	16	▼1	Hong Kong	371
4	18	▼1	Philippines	290
5	19	▼1	Chinese Taipei	289
6	27	▼1	India	103
7	28	▼1	Thailand	98
8	31	▲1	Malaysia	60
*Local rankings based on WBSC ranking points

WBSC Women's Rankings (as of 21 October 2026)
Asia*	WBSC	+/-	National Team	Points
1	1	Steady	Japan	3726
2	5	Steady	Chinese Taipei	2465
3	8	Steady	China	1790
4	14	Steady	Philippines	960
5	26	▼3	Singapore	380
6	28	▲3	South Korea	305
7	32	▲2	Hong Kong	282
8	43	Steady	Thailand	126
9	49	Steady	India	75
10	53	Steady	Malaysia	31
11	59	Steady	Indonesia	15
*Local rankings based on WBSC ranking points

=== Baseball5 ===
WBSC Baseball5 Rankings (as of 22 September 2026)
Asia*	WBSC	+/-	National Team	Points
1	2	Steady	Chinese Taipei	4801
2	4	Steady	Japan	4385
3	12	Steady	South Korea	2127
4	15	Steady	Hong Kong	1322
5	16	Steady	Thailand	1205
6	19	Steady	China	1120
7	25	Steady	Malaysia	878
8	29	Steady	Indonesia	528
9	30	Steady	Iraq	525
10	34	Steady	Jordan	500
11	42	Steady	Saudi Arabia	389
12	46	Steady	Syria	305
13	48	Steady	Singapore	295
14	50	Steady	Vietnam	267
15	52	▼1	India	250
15	52	▼1	Mongolia	250
16	52	▼1	North Korea	250
17	52	▼1	Nepal	250
18	52	▼1	Bangladesh	250
20	65	Steady	Pakistan	100
20	65	Steady	Laos	100
*Local rankings based on WBSC ranking points

=== Historical leaders ===
Highest Ranked Asia member in the WBSC Rankings

Men's baseball

Women's baseball

Men's softball

Women's softball

== Competitions ==
=== Baseball ===
Men's

- Asian Baseball Championship
- Asian Baseball Cup
- U-18 Asian Baseball Championship
- U-15 Asian Baseball Championship
- U-12 Asian Baseball Championship

Women's

- Women's Baseball Asian Cup

Club

- Asian City Baseball Tournament

=== Softball ===
Men's

- Asian Men's Softball Championship
- U-23 Asian Men's Softball Championship
- U-18 Men Softball Asia Cup

Women's

- Asian Women's Softball Championship
- Asia Cup Asian Universities Women's Softball
- U-15 Women Softball Asia Cup

=== Baseball5 ===
- Baseball5 Asia Cup
- Youth Baseball5 Asia Cup

=== Current title holders ===
Competition		Year	Host country	Champions	Title	Runners-up	Next edition	Dates
Baseball
Asian Baseball Championship		2025	China	Japan	21st	Chinese Taipei	2027	
Asian Baseball Cup	East Division	2024	Philippines	Philippines	7th	Hong Kong	2026	7-13 December
Asian Baseball Cup	West Division	2025	Iran	Palestine	1st	Pakistan	TBD	
U-18 Asian Baseball Championship		2026	Taiwan	South Korea	6th	Japan	2028	
U-15 Asian Baseball Championship		2025	Taiwan	Chinese Taipei	8th	Japan	2027	
U-12 Asian Baseball Championship		2026	China	Japan	2nd	Chinese Taipei	2028	
Women's Baseball Asian Cup		2025	China	Japan	4th	Chinese Taipei	TBD	
Softball
Asian Men's Softball Championship		2023	Japan	Japan	10th	Singapore	TBD	
U-23 Asian Men's Softball Championship		2025	Thailand	Japan	2nd	Singapore	TBD	
U-18 Men Softball Asia Cup		2023	Japan	Japan	1st	Singapore	2026	3-7 December
Asian Women's Softball Championship		2025	China	Japan	9th	China	TBD	
Asian Universities Women's Softball Asia Cup		2026	Taiwan	Japan	2nd	Philippines	TBD	
U-18 Women Softball Asia Cup		2023	China	Japan	1st	Chinese Taipei	TBD	
U-15 Women Softball Asia Cup		2026	China	Japan	2nd	Chinese Taipei	TBD	
Baseball5
Baseball5 Asia Cup		2026	Hong Kong	Chinese Taipei	2nd	Japan	2028	
Youth Baseball5 Asia Cup		2025	Taiwan	Japan	1st	Chinese Taipei	TBD	
Club
Asian City Baseball Tournament		2022	South Korea	(Japan) Saitama	1st	(Chinese Taipei) Taichung	TBD	

== See also ==
- Softball Confederation Asia
- Baseball at the Asian Games
- Asia Series
- Asia Winter Baseball League
- Baseball awards#Asia
