= 1995 Asian Women's Softball Championship =

International softball tournament in Manila, Philippines

Tournament details
- Host country: Philippines
- Dates: 12–18 March 1995
- Teams: 11
- Defending champions: China

Final positions
- Champions: China (3rd title)
- Runner-up: Japan
- Third place: Chinese Taipei
- Fourth place: Philippines

The 1995 Asian Women's Softball Championship was an international softball tournament which featured eleven nations which was held from 12 to 18 March 1995.

The ASEAN Championship was also concurrently held.

The finals for this edition of the Asian Women's Softball Championship was held at the Rizal Memorial Baseball Stadium in Manila, Philippines.

== Participants ==
- China
- Hong Kong
- India
- Japan
- South Korea
- Malaysia
- Pakistan
- Philippines (hosts)
- Singapore
- Thailand
- Chinese Taipei

== Results ==
=== Final ===
18 March 1995	China	8–2	Japan	Rizal Memorial Baseball Stadium, Manila
18 March 1995		Boxscore		Rizal Memorial Baseball Stadium, Manila
