= 2004 Asian Women's Softball Championship =

International softball tournament in Manila, Philippines

Tournament details
- Host country: Philippines
- Dates: 12–18 December 2004
- Teams: 12
- Defending champions: China

Final positions
- Champions: Japan (3rd title)
- Runner-up: Chinese Taipei
- Third place: China
- Fourth place: North Korea

The 2004 Asian Women's Softball Championship was an international softball tournament which featured twelve nations which was held from 12 to 18 December 2004.

This edition of the Asian Women's Softball Championship was held at the Rizal Memorial Baseball Stadium in Manila, Philippines. The top three finishing teams qualified for the 2006 Women's Softball World Championship which was held in Beijing, China.

== Final ranking ==
1. Japan
2. Chinese Taipei
3. China
4. North Korea
5. Philippines
6. South Korea
7. Indonesia
8. Singapore
9. Thailand
10. Hong Kong
11. Malaysia
12. Thailand

Source:Softball Confederation of Asia
