= 2007 Asian Women's Softball Championship =

International softball tournament

Tournament details
- Host country: Indonesia
- Dates: 19–23 August 2007
- Teams: 11
- Defending champions: Japan

Final positions
- Champions: Japan (4th title)
- Runner-up: Chinese Taipei
- Third place: China
- Fourth place: Philippines

The 2007 Asian Women's Softball Championship was an international softball tournament which featured eleven nations which was held from 19–23 August 2007 in Jakarta, Indonesia.

== Final ranking ==
1. Japan
2. Chinese Taipei
3. China
4. Philippines
5. Indonesia / South Korea
6. Thailand
7. Singapore
8. Hong Kong
9. Malaysia

Source:Softball Confederation of Asia
