= Haruka Agatsuma =

Japanese softball player (born 1994)

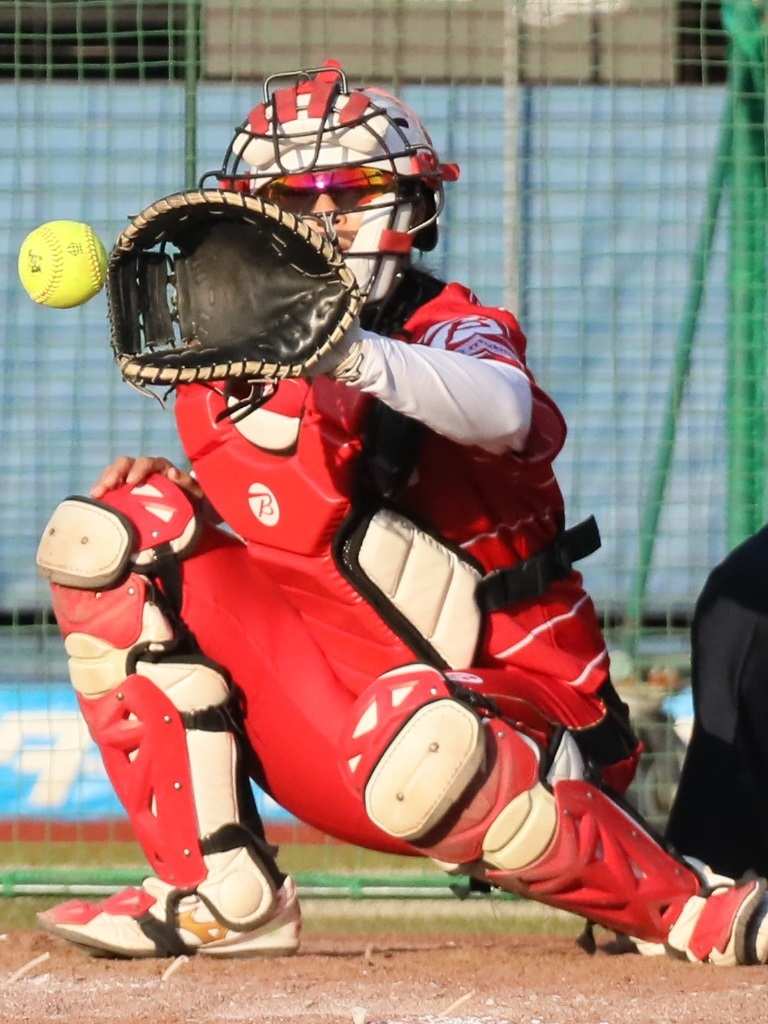
- Agatsuma in 2022

Bic Camera Takasaki Bee Queen – No. 25
- Catcher
- Born: 18 December 1994 (age 31); Kawaguchi, Saitama, Japan
- Bats: Left Throws: Right
Medals
Women's softball
Representing Japan
Olympic Games
Gold medal – first place	2020 Tokyo	Team
World Cup
Silver medal – second place	2016 Surrey	Team
Silver medal – second place	2018 Chiba	Team
World Games
Silver medal – second place	2022 Birmingham	Team
Bronze medal – third place	2025 Chengdu	Team
Asian Games
Gold medal – first place	2018 Jakarta-Palembang	Team
Asian Championship
Gold medal – first place	2017 Taichung	Team
Gold medal – first place	2019 Jakarta	Team

Haruka Agatsuma (我妻 悠香, Agatsuma Haruka, born 18 December 1994) is a Japanese softball player. She competed in the 2020 Summer Olympics and won a gold medal.
