= U-15 Women Softball Asia Cup =

- Sport: Softball
- Founded: 2023
- Continent: Asia
- Most recent champion: Japan (2nd title)
- Most titles: Japan (2 titles)

The U-15 Women Softball Asia Cup is the main championship tournament between national junior (under 15) women's softball teams in Asia, governed by the Softball Confederation of Asia. The inaugural event was held in Nantou County, Taiwan. The tournament also serves as qualification to WBSC's U-15 Women's Softball World Cup for Asia.

== Results ==
Year	Host	Final		Semifinalists	
Year	Host	Champions	Runners-up	3rd place	4th place
2023	(Taiwan); Nantou County	Chinese Taipei	Japan	Philippines	South Korea
2025	(Taiwan); Nantou County	Japan	Chinese Taipei	Singapore	Hong Kong
2026	(China); Weihai	Japan	Chinese Taipei	China	Philippines

== Medal table ==
As of 2026 U-15 Women Softball Asia Cup.

Rank	Nation	Gold	Silver	Bronze	Total
1	Japan	2	1	0	3
2	Chinese Taipei	1	2	0	3
3	China	0	0	1	1
3	Philippines	0	0	1	1
3	Singapore	0	0	1	1
Totals (5 entries)		3	3	3	9

== See also ==
- Asian Women's Softball Championship
- U-12 Softball World Cup (Co-ed event)
- U-15 Women's Softball World Cup
- U-18 Women's Softball World Cup
