= Softball at the 2019 SEA Games – Women's tournament =

Tournament details
- Host country: Philippines
- Dates: 2–8 December
- Teams: 5
- Defending champions: Philippines (2015)

Final positions
- Champions: Philippines
- Runner-up: Indonesia
- Third place: Malaysia
- Fourth place: Singapore

The 2019 Southeast Asian Games women's softball tournament was held at the Clark International Sports Complex at The Villages, in Pampanga from 2 to 8 December 2019.

== Results ==
=== Preliminary round ===
Teams	W	L	Pct.	GB
Philippines (H)	4	0	1.000	–
Malaysia	3	1	.750	1
Singapore	2	2	.500	2
Indonesia	1	3	.250	3
Thailand	0	4	.000	4

December 2, 2019; 9:00	Singapore	0–6	Philippines	Clark International Sports Complex – Field 1, Mabalacat
December 2, 2019; 9:00		Boxscore		Clark International Sports Complex – Field 1, Mabalacat

December 2, 2019; 11:30	Indonesia	4–2	Thailand	Clark International Sports Complex – Field 1, Mabalacat
December 2, 2019; 11:30		Boxscore		Clark International Sports Complex – Field 1, Mabalacat

December 2, 2019; 14:30	Malaysia	1–8	Philippines	Clark International Sports Complex – Field 1, Mabalacat
December 2, 2019; 14:30		Boxscore		Clark International Sports Complex – Field 1, Mabalacat

December 2, 2019; 15:00	Singapore	6–2	Thailand	Clark International Sports Complex – Field 2, Mabalacat
December 2, 2019; 15:00		Boxscore		Clark International Sports Complex – Field 2, Mabalacat

December 3, 2019; 9:00	Thailand	1–2	Malaysia	Clark International Sports Complex – Field 1, Mabalacat
December 3, 2019; 9:00		Boxscore		Clark International Sports Complex – Field 1, Mabalacat

December 3, 2019; 11:30	Indonesia	1–11	Philippines	Clark International Sports Complex – Field 1, Mabalacat
December 3, 2019; 11:30		Boxscore		Clark International Sports Complex – Field 1, Mabalacat

December 5, 2019; 9:00	Singapore	4–5	Malaysia	Clark International Sports Complex – Field 1, Mabalacat
December 5, 2019; 9:00		Boxscore		Clark International Sports Complex – Field 1, Mabalacat

December 4, 2019; 9:00	Indonesia	0–1	Singapore	Clark International Sports Complex – Field 1, Mabalacat
December 4, 2019; 9:00		Boxscore		Clark International Sports Complex – Field 1, Mabalacat

December 4, 2019; 11:30	Philippines	11–0	Thailand	Clark International Sports Complex – Field 1, Mabalacat
December 4, 2019; 11:30		Boxscore		Clark International Sports Complex – Field 1, Mabalacat

December 4, 2019; 14:30	Indonesia	3–5	Malaysia	Clark International Sports Complex – Field 1, Mabalacat
December 4, 2019; 14:30		Boxscore		Clark International Sports Complex – Field 1, Mabalacat

=== Final round ===
==== Page play-offs ====
===== Page 1–2 =====
December 6, 2019; 9:00	Philippines	12–0	Malaysia	Clark International Sports Complex – Field 1, Mabalacat
December 6, 2019; 9:00		Boxscore		Clark International Sports Complex – Field 1, Mabalacat

===== Page 3–4 =====
December 6, 2019; 14:00	Singapore	4–8	Indonesia	Clark International Sports Complex – Field 1, Mabalacat
December 6, 2019; 14:00		Boxscore		Clark International Sports Complex – Field 1, Mabalacat

==== Semi-final ====
December 7, 2019; 9:00	Malaysia	1–5	Indonesia	Clark International Sports Complex, Mabalacat
December 7, 2019; 9:00		Boxscore		Clark International Sports Complex, Mabalacat

==== Final ====
December 8, 2019; 9:00	Philippines	8–0	Indonesia	Clark International Sports Complex, Mabalacat
December 8, 2019; 9:00		Boxscore		Clark International Sports Complex, Mabalacat

== See also ==
- Men's tournament
