= Eri Yamada =

Japanese softball player

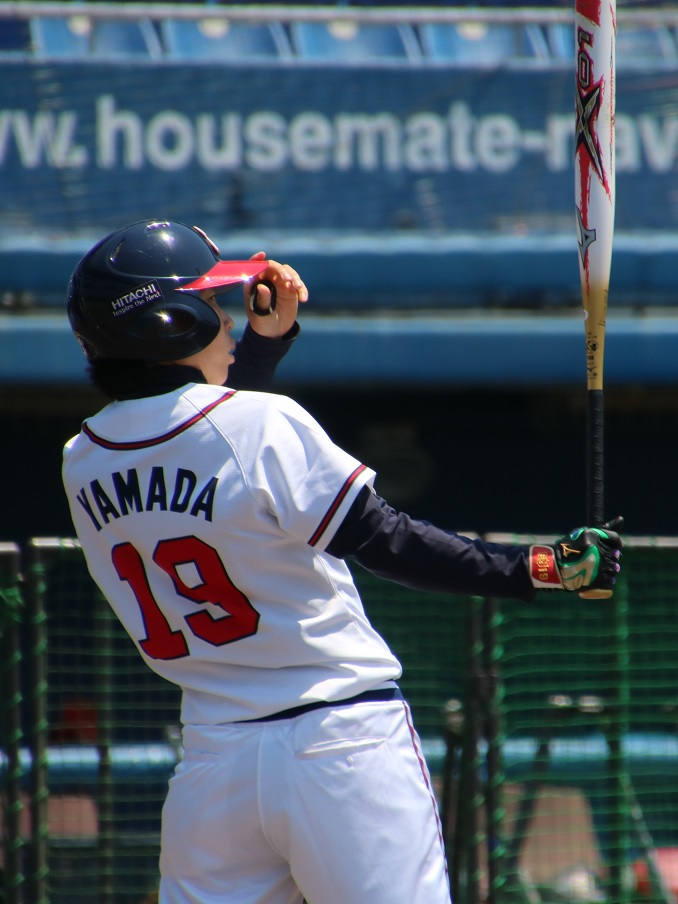

Hitachi Sundiva – No. 19
- Outfield
- Born: 8 March 1984 (age 42); Fujisawa, Japan
- Bats: Left Throws: Left
Medals
Women's Softball
Representing Japan
Olympic Games
Gold medal – first place	2008 Beijing	Team
Gold medal – first place	2020 Tokyo	Team
Bronze medal – third place	2004 Athens	Team
World Cup
Silver medal – second place	2006 Beijing	Team
Silver medal – second place	2010 Caracas	Team
Gold medal – first place	2012 Whitehorse	Team
Gold medal – first place	2014 Haarlem	Team
Silver medal – second place	2016 Surrey	Team
Silver medal – second place	2018 Chiba	Team
Asian Games
Gold medal – first place	2018 Jakarta-Palembang	Team
Asian Championship
Gold medal – first place	2017 Taichung	Team
Gold medal – first place	2019 Jakarta	Team

Eri Yamada (山田 恵里, Yamada Eri; born 8 March 1984) is a Japanese former softball player who won the gold medal at the 2008 Summer Olympics and the 2020 Summer Olympics.

At Beijing, Yamada hit .344 in the tournament while belting two home runs and driving in five for Japan. In the gold medal game she went 2-3, including a solo shot off Cat Osterman.
