= Hitomi Kawabata =

Japanese softball player

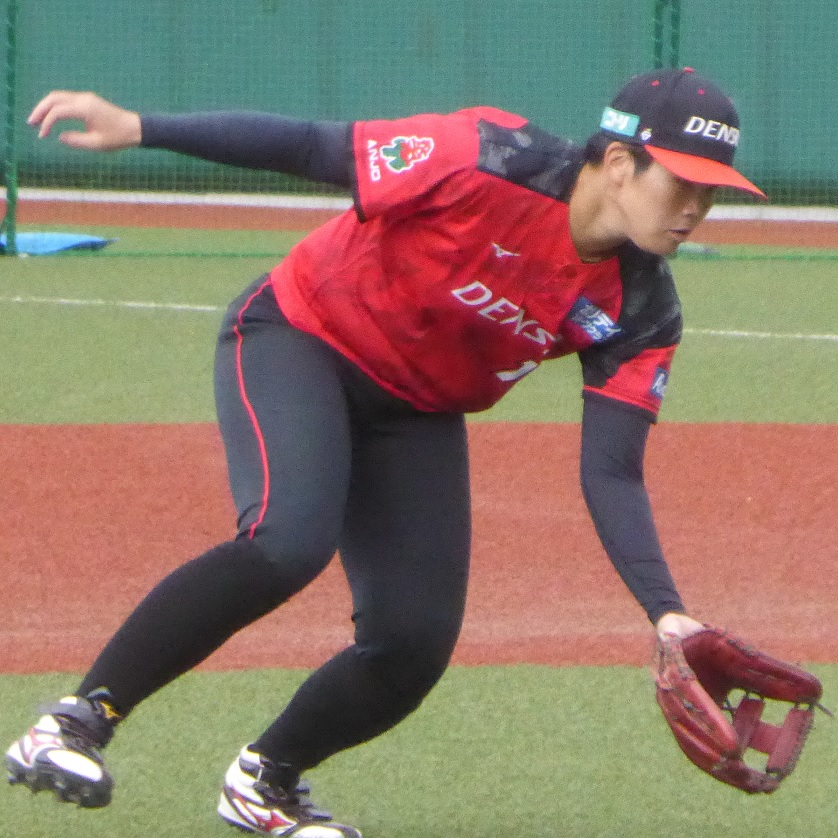
- Kawabata in 2023

Denso Bright Pegasus – No. 10
- Infielder
- Born: May 1, 1996 (age 30); Japan
- Bats: Left Throws: Right
Medals
Women's softball
Representing Japan
Olympic Games
Gold medal – first place	2020 Tokyo	Team
World Cup
Silver medal – second place	2016 Surrey	Team
Silver medal – second place	2018 Chiba	Team
World Games
Silver medal – second place	2022 Birmingham	Team
Asian Games
Gold medal – first place	2018 Jakarta-Palembang	Team
Asian Championship
Gold medal – first place	2017 Taichung	Team
Gold medal – first place	2019 Jakarta	Team

Hitomi Kawabata (Japanese: 川畑瞳) is a Japanese softball player who plays as an infielder. She represented Japan at the 2020 Summer Olympics and won a gold medal.

== Playing career ==
She participated in the 2016 Women's Softball World Championship.
