= Softball at the 2018 Asian Games =

- Venue: Gelora Bung Karno Softball Field
- Dates: 19–24 August 2018
- Competitors: 119 from 7 nations

Softball at the 2018 Asian Games was held at the Gelora Bung Karno Softball Field in Jakarta, Indonesia, from 19 to 24 August 2018. The only event held was the women's softball.

== Schedule ==
P	Preliminary round	½	Semifinals	F	Final	G	Grand final

Event↓/Date →	19th Sun	20th Mon	21st Tue	22nd Wed	23rd Thu		24th Fri	
Women	P	P	P	P	P	½	F	G

== Medalists ==
Event	Gold	Silver	Bronze
Women	Japan; Nozomi Nagasaki; Saki Yamazaki; Yuka Ichiguchi; Yu Yamamoto; Kyoko Ishikawa; Nodoka Harada; Misato Kawano; Hitomi Kawabata; Eri Yamada; Mana Atsumi; Minori Naito; Yukari Hamamura; Yamato Fujita; Yukiko Ueno; Natsuko Sugama; Haruka Agatsuma; Saori Yamauchi	Chinese Taipei; Lin Ying-hsin; Shih Ching-ping; Li Szu-shih; Lin Feng-chen; Lai Meng-ting; Lin Su-hua; Chen Miao-yi; Yen Yi; Tsai Chia-chen; Lin Chih-ying; Liu Hsuan; Su Yi-hsuan; Lin Pei-chun; Chiu An-ju; Yang Yi-ting; Chen Chia-yi; Tu Ya-ting	China; Wang Mengyan; Xu Qianwen; Liu Lili; Lu Ying; Xi Kailin; Wang Xiaoqing; Chen Jia; Liu Yining; Wang Bei; Zhao Xinxing; Xu Jia; Wang Lan; Li Huan; Zhang Yan; Chai Yinan; Ren Min; Li Qi

== Squads ==
Squads

China	Chinese Taipei	Hong Kong	Indonesia
Wang Mengyan; Xu Qianwen; Liu Lili; Lu Ying; Xi Kailin; Wang Xiaoqing; Chen Jia; Liu Yining; Wang Bei; Zhao Xinxing; Xu Jia; Wang Lan; Li Huan; Zhang Yan; Chai Yinan; Ren Min; Li Qi	Lin Ying-hsin; Shih Ching-ping; Li Szu-shih; Lin Feng-chen; Lai Meng-ting; Lin Su-hua; Chen Miao-yi; Yen Yi; Tsai Chia-chen; Lin Chih-ying; Liu Hsuan; Su Yi-hsuan; Lin Pei-chun; Chiu An-ju; Yang Yi-ting; Chen Chia-yi; Tu Ya-ting	Lau Hiu Kwan; Leung Tsz Yan; Ku Oi Yu; Courtney Chan; Marcia Wong; Chan Yin Yu; Hui Kai Yan; Lau Yu Yan; Chen Sie Lam; Pong Yui Chi; Chan Hoi Kei; Lau Hiu Man; Tang Wai San; Wong Cho Hei; Lam Pui Kwan; Leung Hiu Tung; Ng Yan Wa	Adelaide Tania Waromi; Gisza Gabriella; Monica Isella; Delin; Syehan Hana Rahmania; Vinny Anugerah Dwi Putri; Febina Fitriani; Agustina Diadiaway; Lidia Anna Krey; Yuka Ramadina; Wa Ode Siti Saputriani; Ashilla Safiya; Adhisty Deynira Nuranjani; Dian Agustina; Steffaney Angelica Johanna; Ilka Arunia Emogene; Cresida Mariska Dwiyanti
Japan	Philippines	South Korea	
Nozomi Nagasaki; Saki Yamazaki; Yuka Ichiguchi; Yu Yamamoto; Kyoko Ishikawa; Nodoka Harada; Misato Kawano; Hitomi Kawabata; Eri Yamada; Mana Atsumi; Minori Naito; Yukari Hamamura; Yamato Fujita; Yukiko Ueno; Natsuko Sugama; Haruka Agatsuma; Saori Yamauchi	Garie Blando; Ezra Jalandoni; Shaira Damasing; Skylynne Ellazar; Ann Antolihao; Cheska Altomonte; Hailey Decker; Chelsea Suitos; Sierra Lange; Riezel Calumbres; Angelie Ursabia; Reese Guevarra; Arianne Vallestero; Royevel Palma; Mia Macapagal; Cristy Roa; Riflayca Basa	Kim Ha-na; Kim Seo-hyeon; Jeong Yoon-young; Jang Se-jin; Suk Eun-jung; Jeon Dae-rim; Yang I-seul; Lee Ye-ji; Won Hye-song; Kim Yu-jeong; Jung Hye-in; Lee Mi-sun; Seol Ga-eun; Bae Nae-hye; Bae Yu-ka; Park Su-youn; Jung Na-rae	

== Results ==
All times are Western Indonesia Time (UTC+07:00)

=== Preliminary round ===
Pos	Team	Pld	W	L	RF	RA	PCT	GB	Qualification
1	Japan	6	6	0	60	3	1.000	—	Semifinals
2	China	6	4	2	30	16	.667 (Note: Tied on head-to-head wins (1). Head-to-head runs against: CHN 1, PHI 3, TPE 7.)	2	Semifinals
3	Philippines	6	4	2	21	17	.667	2	Semifinals
4	Chinese Taipei	6	4	2	27	13	.667	2	Semifinals
5	South Korea	6	2	4	15	23	.333	4	
6	Indonesia	6	1	5	15	41	.167	5	
7	Hong Kong	6	0	6	2	57	.000	6	

Source: OCA
Notes:

19 August; 10:00	Hong Kong	1–5	South Korea	Gelora Bung Karno Softball Field, Jakarta; Umpires: Lin Yu-sung (TPE)
19 August; 10:00	LP: Ng Yan Wa		WP: Jung Na-rae	Gelora Bung Karno Softball Field, Jakarta; Umpires: Lin Yu-sung (TPE)

Team	1	2	3	4	5	6	7	R	H	E
South Korea	0	5	0	0	0	0	0	5	5	0
Hong Kong	0	0	1	0	0	0	0	1	5	0

19 August; 12:30	China	12–0 (F/4)	Indonesia	Gelora Bung Karno Softball Field, Jakarta; Umpires: Jo Bo-yeon (KOR)
19 August; 12:30	WP: Zhao Xinxing		LP: Lidia Anna Krey	Gelora Bung Karno Softball Field, Jakarta; Umpires: Jo Bo-yeon (KOR)

Team	1	2	3	4	5	6	7	R	H	E
Indonesia	0	0	0	0	—	—	—	0	3	2
China	6	3	3	X	—	—	—	12	14	1

19 August; 15:00	South Korea	2–3 (F/8)	Chinese Taipei	Gelora Bung Karno Softball Field, Jakarta; Umpires: Takashi Hashimoto (JPN)
19 August; 15:00	LP: Bae Yu-ka		WP: Chiu An-ju	Gelora Bung Karno Softball Field, Jakarta; Umpires: Takashi Hashimoto (JPN)
19 August; 15:00			HR: Chen Chia-yi (2)	Gelora Bung Karno Softball Field, Jakarta; Umpires: Takashi Hashimoto (JPN)

Team	1	2	3	4	5	6	7	8	R	H	E
Chinese Taipei	0	0	1	0	1	0	0	1	3	9	1
South Korea	0	0	1	0	0	0	1	0	2	6	0

19 August; 17:30	Indonesia	0–7 (F/5)	Japan	Gelora Bung Karno Softball Field, Jakarta; Umpires: Paulo Tabirara (PHI)
19 August; 17:30	LP: Wa Ode Siti Saputriani		WP: Yukari Hamamura	Gelora Bung Karno Softball Field, Jakarta; Umpires: Paulo Tabirara (PHI)
19 August; 17:30			HR: Misato Kawano (1)	Gelora Bung Karno Softball Field, Jakarta; Umpires: Paulo Tabirara (PHI)

Team	1	2	3	4	5	6	7	R	H	E
Japan	4	1	1	0	1	—	—	7	5	1
Indonesia	0	0	0	0	0	—	—	0	2	3

19 August; 20:00	Philippines	8–0 (F/5)	Hong Kong	Gelora Bung Karno Softball Field, Jakarta; Umpires: Tseng Chiung-hsien (TPE)
19 August; 20:00	WP: Mia Macapagal		LP: Tang Wai San	Gelora Bung Karno Softball Field, Jakarta; Umpires: Tseng Chiung-hsien (TPE)

Team	1	2	3	4	5	6	7	R	H	E
Hong Kong	0	0	0	0	0	—	—	0	4	1
Philippines	6	0	0	2	X	—	—	8	9	0

20 August; 10:00	Chinese Taipei	1–3	Japan	Gelora Bung Karno Softball Field, Jakarta; Umpires: Rully Rinaldi Andriyanto (INA)
20 August; 10:00	LP: Lin Su-hua		WP: Yukari Hamamura	Gelora Bung Karno Softball Field, Jakarta; Umpires: Rully Rinaldi Andriyanto (INA)

Team	1	2	3	4	5	6	7	R	H	E
Japan	3	0	0	0	0	0	0	3	5	0
Chinese Taipei	0	0	0	0	0	0	1	1	4	0

20 August; 12:30	China	10–0 (F/4)	Hong Kong	Gelora Bung Karno Softball Field, Jakarta; Umpires: Nor Hajar Abd Hamid (MAS)
20 August; 12:30	WP: Zhao Xinxing		LP: Hui Kai Yan	Gelora Bung Karno Softball Field, Jakarta; Umpires: Nor Hajar Abd Hamid (MAS)

Team	1	2	3	4	5	6	7	R	H	E
Hong Kong	0	0	0	0	—	—	—	0	1	3
China	5	0	2	3	—	—	—	10	8	0

20 August; 15:00	South Korea	3–5	Philippines	Gelora Bung Karno Softball Field, Jakarta; Umpires: Xie Xin (CHN)
20 August; 15:00	LP: Bae Nae-hye		WP: Sierra Lange	Gelora Bung Karno Softball Field, Jakarta; Umpires: Xie Xin (CHN)
20 August; 15:00	HR: Jung Hye-in (1), Lee Ye-ji (1)		HR: Arianne Vallestero (1)	Gelora Bung Karno Softball Field, Jakarta; Umpires: Xie Xin (CHN)

Team	1	2	3	4	5	6	7	R	H	E
Philippines	3	0	1	0	0	0	1	5	7	0
South Korea	0	0	0	3	0	0	0	3	5	1

20 August; 17:30	Indonesia	0–14 (F/4)	Chinese Taipei	Gelora Bung Karno Softball Field, Jakarta; Umpires: Lo Wing Yan (HKG)
20 August; 17:30	LP: Lidia Anna Krey		WP: Tsai Chia-chen	Gelora Bung Karno Softball Field, Jakarta; Umpires: Lo Wing Yan (HKG)

Team	1	2	3	4	5	6	7	R	H	E
Chinese Taipei	2	1	9	2	—	—	—	14	11	0
Indonesia	0	0	0	0	—	—	—	0	2	2

20 August; 20:00	China	0–1	Philippines	Gelora Bung Karno Softball Field, Jakarta; Umpires: Mari Jinno (JPN)
20 August; 20:00	LP: Wang Lan		WP: Ezra Jalandoni; Sv: Sierra Lange	Gelora Bung Karno Softball Field, Jakarta; Umpires: Mari Jinno (JPN)

Team	1	2	3	4	5	6	7	R	H	E
Philippines	0	0	0	0	1	0	0	1	4	0
China	0	0	0	0	0	0	0	0	3	2

21 August; 10:00	China	2–1	South Korea	Gelora Bung Karno Softball Field, Jakarta; Umpires: Paulo Tabirara (PHI)
21 August; 10:00	WP: Zhao Xinxing; Sv: Wang Lan		LP: Jung Na-rae	Gelora Bung Karno Softball Field, Jakarta; Umpires: Paulo Tabirara (PHI)

Team	1	2	3	4	5	6	7	R	H	E
South Korea	0	0	0	0	0	1	0	1	4	0
China	2	0	0	0	0	0	X	2	5	1

21 August; 12:30	Hong Kong	0–15 (F/4)	Japan	Gelora Bung Karno Softball Field, Jakarta; Umpires: Rully Rinaldi Andriyanto (INA)
21 August; 12:30	LP: Tang Wai San		WP: Yukari Hamamura	Gelora Bung Karno Softball Field, Jakarta; Umpires: Rully Rinaldi Andriyanto (INA)
21 August; 12:30			HR: Hitomi Kawabata (1)	Gelora Bung Karno Softball Field, Jakarta; Umpires: Rully Rinaldi Andriyanto (INA)

Team	1	2	3	4	5	6	7	R	H	E
Japan	4	4	0	7	—	—	—	15	12	0
Hong Kong	0	0	0	0	—	—	—	0	1	3

21 August; 15:00	South Korea	4–2	Indonesia	Gelora Bung Karno Softball Field, Jakarta; Umpires: Ge Lan (CHN)
21 August; 15:00	WP: Lee Mi-sun		LP: Wa Ode Siti Saputriani	Gelora Bung Karno Softball Field, Jakarta; Umpires: Ge Lan (CHN)

Team	1	2	3	4	5	6	7	R	H	E
Indonesia	0	2	0	0	0	0	0	2	8	1
South Korea	2	0	0	2	0	0	X	4	5	0

21 August; 17:30	Philippines	1–11 (F/4)	Japan	Gelora Bung Karno Softball Field, Jakarta; Umpires: Jo Bo-yeon (KOR)
21 August; 17:30	LP: Mia Macapagal		WP: Yamato Fujita	Gelora Bung Karno Softball Field, Jakarta; Umpires: Jo Bo-yeon (KOR)
21 August; 17:30			HR: Yamato Fujita (1), Eri Yamada (1)	Gelora Bung Karno Softball Field, Jakarta; Umpires: Jo Bo-yeon (KOR)

Team	1	2	3	4	5	6	7	R	H	E
Japan	0	2	0	9	—	—	—	11	7	0
Philippines	1	0	0	0	—	—	—	1	5	0

21 August; 20:00	China	5–0	Chinese Taipei	Gelora Bung Karno Softball Field, Jakarta; Umpires: Mari Jinno (JPN)
21 August; 20:00	WP: Wang Lan		LP: Lin Su-hua	Gelora Bung Karno Softball Field, Jakarta; Umpires: Mari Jinno (JPN)
21 August; 20:00	HR: Lu Ying (1)			Gelora Bung Karno Softball Field, Jakarta; Umpires: Mari Jinno (JPN)

Team	1	2	3	4	5	6	7	R	H	E
Chinese Taipei	0	0	0	0	0	0	0	0	4	1
China	2	1	1	0	1	0	X	5	7	0

22 August; 10:00	Japan	10–0 (F/4)	South Korea	Gelora Bung Karno Softball Field, Jakarta; Umpires: Lin Yu-sung (TPE)
22 August; 10:00	WP: Yukiko Ueno		LP: Jung Na-rae	Gelora Bung Karno Softball Field, Jakarta; Umpires: Lin Yu-sung (TPE)
22 August; 10:00	HR: Yu Yamamoto (1)			Gelora Bung Karno Softball Field, Jakarta; Umpires: Lin Yu-sung (TPE)

Team	1	2	3	4	5	6	7	R	H	E
South Korea	0	0	0	0	—	—	—	0	2	0
Japan	6	3	0	1	—	—	—	10	6	0

22 August; 12:30	Philippines	4–0	Indonesia	Gelora Bung Karno Softball Field, Jakarta; Umpires: Xie Xin (CHN)
22 August; 12:30	WP: Royevel Palma		LP: Monica Isella	Gelora Bung Karno Softball Field, Jakarta; Umpires: Xie Xin (CHN)

Team	1	2	3	4	5	6	7	R	H	E
Indonesia	0	0	0	0	0	0	0	0	5	1
Philippines	2	0	0	1	0	1	X	4	9	0

22 August; 15:00	Chinese Taipei	6–1	Hong Kong	Gelora Bung Karno Softball Field, Jakarta; Umpires: Tubagus Fikri Hamid (INA)
22 August; 15:00	WP: Tsai Chia-chen		LP: Tang Wai San	Gelora Bung Karno Softball Field, Jakarta; Umpires: Tubagus Fikri Hamid (INA)

Team	1	2	3	4	5	6	7	R	H	E
Hong Kong	0	0	0	1	0	0	0	1	2	1
Chinese Taipei	1	0	2	0	1	2	X	6	8	1

22 August; 17:30	China	1–14 (F/6)	Japan	Gelora Bung Karno Softball Field, Jakarta; Umpires: Paulo Tabirara (PHI)
22 August; 17:30	LP: Zhao Xinxing		WP: Yukari Hamamura	Gelora Bung Karno Softball Field, Jakarta; Umpires: Paulo Tabirara (PHI)
22 August; 17:30	HR: Xu Jia (1)		HR: Saki Yamazaki (1), Natsuko Sugama (1)	Gelora Bung Karno Softball Field, Jakarta; Umpires: Paulo Tabirara (PHI)

Team	1	2	3	4	5	6	7	R	H	E
Japan	1	0	0	1	4	8	—	14	15	0
China	0	0	0	0	0	1	—	1	1	4

22 August; 20:00	Chinese Taipei	3–2	Philippines	Gelora Bung Karno Softball Field, Jakarta; Umpires: Takashi Hashimoto (JPN)
22 August; 20:00	WP: Tu Ya-ting		LP: Sierra Lange	Gelora Bung Karno Softball Field, Jakarta; Umpires: Takashi Hashimoto (JPN)
22 August; 20:00	HR: Li Szu-shih (1)		HR: Hailey Decker (1)	Gelora Bung Karno Softball Field, Jakarta; Umpires: Takashi Hashimoto (JPN)

Team	1	2	3	4	5	6	7	R	H	E
Philippines	0	0	0	2	0	0	0	2	7	0
Chinese Taipei	0	0	1	1	0	0	1	3	7	0

23 August; 10:00	Hong Kong	0–13 (F/4)	Indonesia	Gelora Bung Karno Softball Field, Jakarta; Umpires: Huang Shao-chun (TPE)
23 August; 10:00	LP: Tang Wai San		WP: Lidia Anna Krey	Gelora Bung Karno Softball Field, Jakarta; Umpires: Huang Shao-chun (TPE)

Team	1	2	3	4	5	6	7	R	H	E
Indonesia	5	1	5	2	—	—	—	13	11	0
Hong Kong	0	0	0	0	—	—	—	0	1	8

=== Final round ===
Semifinals
1	Japan	5
2	China	0
3	Philippines	3
4	Chinese Taipei	6

Final
2	China	4
4	Chinese Taipei (F/8)	5

Grand final
1	Japan (F/5)	7
4	Chinese Taipei	0

==== Semifinals ====
23 August; 15:00	Japan	5–0	China	Gelora Bung Karno Softball Field, Jakarta; Umpires: Jo Bo-yeon (KOR)
23 August; 15:00	WP: Yamato Fujita		LP: Zhao Xinxing	Gelora Bung Karno Softball Field, Jakarta; Umpires: Jo Bo-yeon (KOR)
23 August; 15:00	HR: Yu Yamamoto (1)			Gelora Bung Karno Softball Field, Jakarta; Umpires: Jo Bo-yeon (KOR)

Team	1	2	3	4	5	6	7	R	H	E
China	0	0	0	0	0	0	0	0	1	1
Japan	1	2	2	0	0	0	X	5	8	0

23 August; 18:00	Philippines	3–6	Chinese Taipei	Gelora Bung Karno Softball Field, Jakarta; Umpires: Mari Jinno (JPN)
23 August; 18:00	LP: Sierra Lange		WP: Tu Ya-ting	Gelora Bung Karno Softball Field, Jakarta; Umpires: Mari Jinno (JPN)
23 August; 18:00			HR: Lai Meng-ting (1), Lin Feng-chen (1)	Gelora Bung Karno Softball Field, Jakarta; Umpires: Mari Jinno (JPN)

Team	1	2	3	4	5	6	7	R	H	E
Chinese Taipei	1	0	0	2	3	0	0	6	12	2
Philippines	1	0	0	0	2	0	0	3	6	0

==== Final ====
24 August; 10:00	China	4–5 (F/8)	Chinese Taipei	Gelora Bung Karno Softball Field, Jakarta; Umpires: Takashi Hashimoto (JPN)
24 August; 10:00	LP: Wang Lan		WP: Lin Su-hua	Gelora Bung Karno Softball Field, Jakarta; Umpires: Takashi Hashimoto (JPN)

Team	1	2	3	4	5	6	7	8	R	H	E
Chinese Taipei	1	0	0	0	3	0	0	1	5	9	0
China	1	2	0	0	0	1	0	0	4	9	0

==== Grand final ====
24 August; 15:00	Japan	7–0 (F/5)	Chinese Taipei	Gelora Bung Karno Softball Field, Jakarta; Umpires: Paulo Tabirara (PHI)
24 August; 15:00	WP: Yukiko Ueno		LP: Tu Ya-ting	Gelora Bung Karno Softball Field, Jakarta; Umpires: Paulo Tabirara (PHI)
24 August; 15:00	HR: Yu Yamamoto (1)			Gelora Bung Karno Softball Field, Jakarta; Umpires: Paulo Tabirara (PHI)

Team	1	2	3	4	5	6	7	R	H	E
Chinese Taipei	0	0	0	0	0	—	—	0	1	1
Japan	3	4	0	0	X	—	—	7	5	0

== Final standing ==
Rank	Team	Pld	W	L
1st place, gold medalist(s)	Japan	8	8	0
2nd place, silver medalist(s)	Chinese Taipei	9	6	3
3rd place, bronze medalist(s)	China	8	4	4
4	Philippines	7	4	3
5	South Korea	6	2	4
6	Indonesia	6	1	5
7	Hong Kong	6	0	6
