= Japan–USA Softball All-Star Series =

Annual softball series between Japan National Team and USA National Team

Japan–USA Softball All-Star Series 日米対抗ソフトボール
- Status: Active
- Frequency: Annually
- Country: Japan
- Inaugurated: 2016
- Most recent: 2024
- Participants: Japan National Team (United States) USA National Team
- Organiser: Japan Softball Association; Yomiuri Shimbun

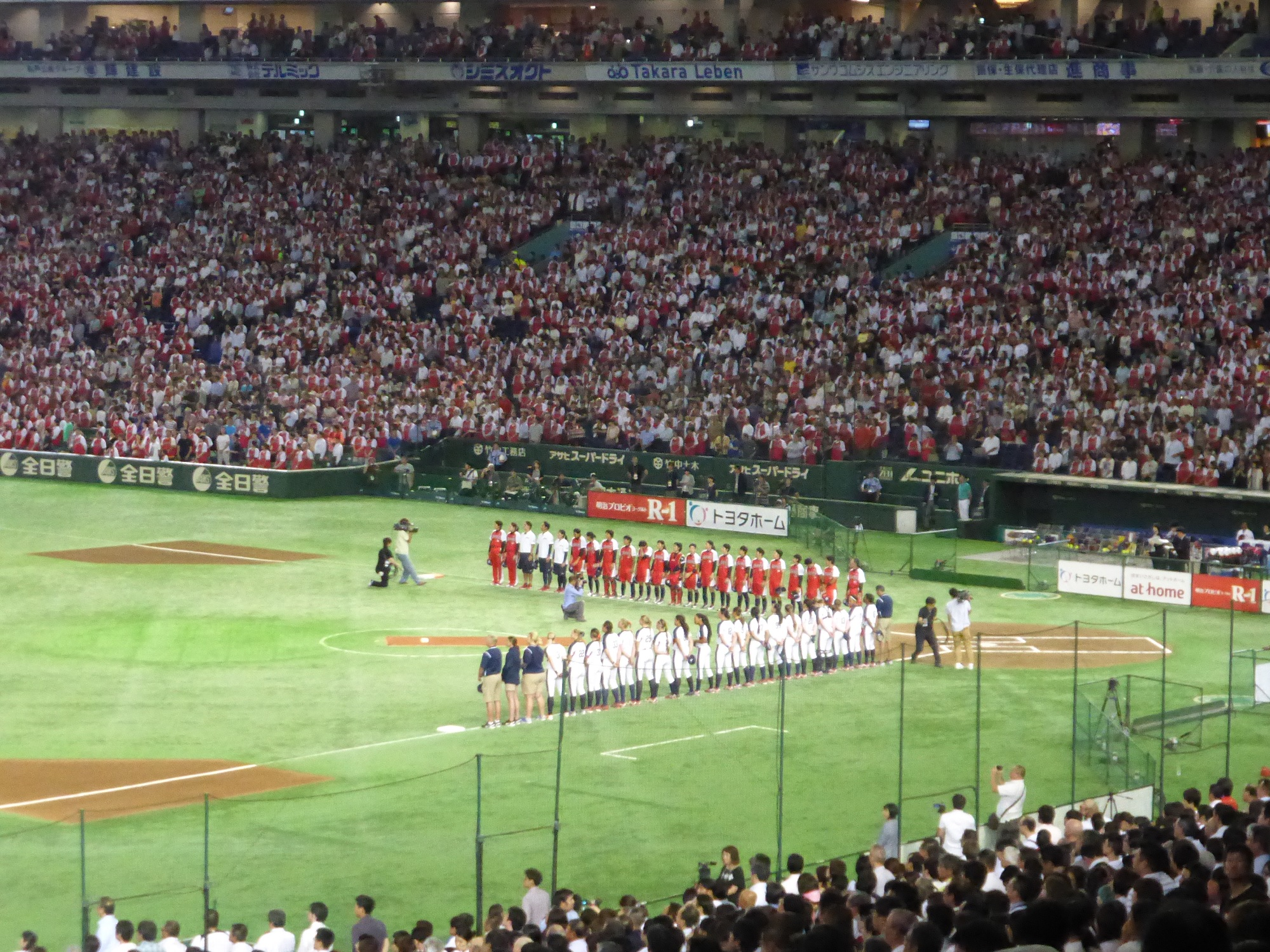
The inaugural game held at Tokyo Dome on June 23, 2016, with over 30,000 spectators

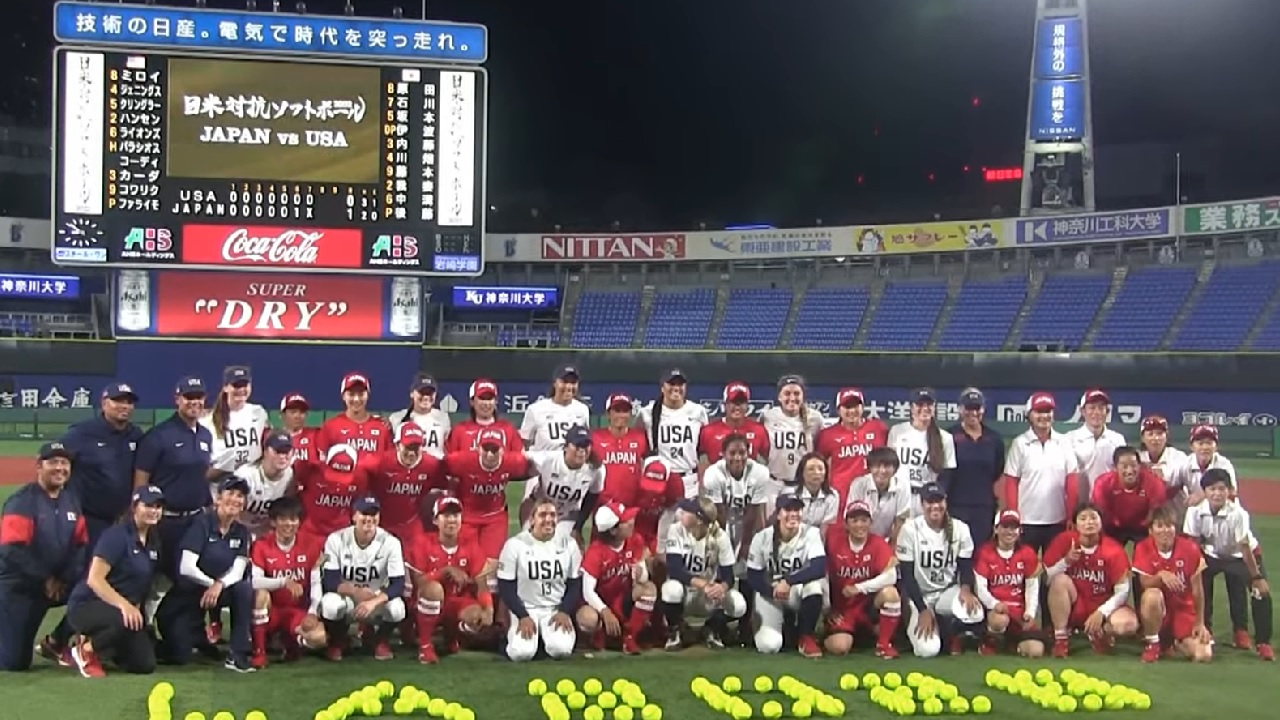
The closing ceremony of the 2022 series at Yokohama Stadium, the first competition after Tokyo 2020 and the COVID-19 suspension

The Japan–USA Softball All-Star Series (Japanese: 日米対抗ソフトボール, Hepburn: Nichibei Taikō Sofutobōru) is an annual tour of Japan made by the United States women's national softball team since 2016, contested in a three-game series against the Japan women's national softball team. At the start of all games, both the Japanese and American national anthems are played.

The inaugural game was held at Tokyo Dome on June 23, 2016, with 31,448 spectators in attendance. The 2020 and 2021 editions were canceled because of the COVID-19 pandemic, and the series resumed in 2022.

== List of series ==
Year	Dates	Japan won	USA won	Tied	Ref
2016	June 23–25	2 games	1 game	0 games	
2017	June 23–25	2 games	1 game	0 games	
2018	June 20–22	3 games	0 games	0 games	
2019	June 22, 23, 25	2 games	1 game	0 games	
2020	Canceled due to the COVID-19 pandemic				
2021	Canceled due to the COVID-19 pandemic				
2022	August 6–8	2 games	1 game	0 games	
2023	August 4, 6, 7	2 games	1 game	0 games	
2024	July 4, 6, 8	3 games	0 games	0 games	
Total		16 games	5 games	0 games	

== See also ==
- MLB Japan All-Star Series
