= 2019 Asian Women's Softball Championship =

Tournament details
- Host country: Indonesia
- Teams: 10
- Venue: 1 (in 1 host city)
- Defending champions: Japan

Final positions
- Champions: Japan (7th title)
- Runner-up: China
- Third place: Chinese Taipei
- Fourth place: Philippines

Tournament statistics
- Most Valuable Player: (Japan) Eri Yamada

The 2019 Asian Women's Softball Championship was an international softball tournament which featured ten nations and was held from 1–7 May 2019 in Jakarta, Indonesia. Matches were held at the Gelora Bung Karno Softball Stadium

The tournament also serves as the qualifiers for the WBSC Softball Asia/Oceania 2019 Qualifying Event for the 2020 Summer Olympics in Tokyo. The top six teams aside from the Olympic hosts, Japan, advanced to the final Olympic qualifier to be hosted in Shanghai, China. The top three nations also qualified for the 2021 Women's World Championships.

== Participants ==
- China
- Hong Kong
- Indonesia (hosts)
- India
- Japan
- South Korea
- Philippines
- Singapore
- Thailand
- Chinese Taipei

== Preliminary round ==
=== Group A ===
Teams	W	L	Pct.	GB
Japan	4	0	1.000	–
China	3	1	.750	1
South Korea	2	2	.500	2
Thailand	1	3	.250	3
India	0	4	.000	4

=== Group B ===
Teams	W	L	Pct.	GB
Chinese Taipei	4	0	1.000	–
Philippines	3	1	.750	1
Hong Kong	2	2	.500	2
Indonesia	1	3	.250	3
Singapore	0	4	.000	4

== Final round ==
Playoffs
A1	Japan	7
B4	Indonesia	0
A3	South Korea	1
B2	Philippines	5
B3	Hong Kong	2
A2	China	11
A4	Thailand	0
B1	Chinese Taipei	15

Semifinals
A1	Japan	10
B2	Philippines	0
A2	China	W
B1	Chinese Taipei	L

Final
A1	Japan	9
A2	China	2
Third place
B2	Philippines	0
B1	Chinese Taipei	10

=== Classification 5th–8th place ===
Playoff
B4	Indonesia	4
A4	Thailand	3
B3	Hong Kong	0
A3	South Korea	11

5th place match
B4	Indonesia	2
A3	South Korea	11
7th place match
A4	Thailand	3
B4	Hong Kong	13

== Final standings ==
Qualified for: 2021 Women's Softball World Championship; WBSC Softball Asia/Oceania 2019 Qualifying Event (excluding Olympics hosts, Japan)
Qualified for: WBSC Softball Asia/Oceania 2019 Qualifying Event

Rank	Team
Gold medal	Japan
Silver medal	China
Bronze medal	Chinese Taipei
4th	Philippines
5th	South Korea
6th	Indonesia
7th	Hong Kong
8th	Thailand
9th	Singapore
10th	India

Source: World Baseball Softball Confederation

== Individual awards ==
- Most Valuable Player: (Japan) Eri Yamada
- Best Pitcher: (Japan) Misaki Katsumata
- Best Hitter: (Philippines) Angeline Ursabia
- Best Slugger: (Philippines) Angeline Ursabia
- Most Stolen Base: (Japan) Mikiko Eguchi
- Most Runs Batted (RBI): (Chinese Taipei) Chen Chia-Yi
