= Clan Softball Club =

Scottish softball team

The Clan Softball Club is a Scottish co-ed slow pitch softball touring team. They have entered tournaments in Canada, England, France, Ireland and the United States.

In 2005 the Clan won the International Softball Federation’s (ISF) II Slow Pitch World Cup.
