= Nepal Baseball and Softball Association =

- Sport: Baseball
- Jurisdiction: Nepal
- Abbreviation: NBSA
- Founded: 2009
- Affiliation: International Baseball Federation
- Regional affiliation: Baseball Federation of Asia
- Headquarters: National Sports Council, Kathmandu
- President: Dipak Neupane
- Secretary: Pradeep Shah

Official website
- www.nbsa.org.np
- (Nepal)

Nepal Baseball and Softball Association (NBSA) is the governing body for baseball in Nepal.The Association was founded in 2009, to promote the games of baseball in the country.

== Affiliated Province Baseball and Softball Associations ==
Province Association	Province	Affiliate District Association	President
Koshi Province Baseball and Softball Association	Koshi Province		Karna Bahadur Rayamajhi
Madhesh Province Baseball and Softball Association	Madhesh Province		Shushil Yadav
Bagmati Province Baseball and Softball Association	Bagmati Province	Kavre District Baseball and Softball Association; Bhaktapur District Baseball and Softball Association; Kathmandu District Baseball and Softball Association	Dhurba Kumar Rijal
Gandaki Province Baseball and Softball Association	Gandaki Province		Aashis Shrestha
Lumbini Province Baseball and Softball Association	Lumbini Province		
Karnali Province Baseball and Softball Association	Karnali Province		Manoj Rana
Sudurpashchim Province Baseball and Softball Association	Sudurpashchim Province		Rohit Jung Kunwar

== Affiliations ==
NBSA is affiliated with:

- International Baseball Federation
- Baseball Federation of Asia
- Nepal Olympic Committee

== See also ==
- Nepal national baseball team
- Nepal women's national baseball team
