= Slovenia women's national softball team =

The Slovenia women's national softball team is the national team of the Slovenia. It is governed by the Zveza Za Baseball In Softball Slovenije.

== Results ==
World Championship

Year	1990	1994	1998	2002	2006	2010	2012	2014
Standing	nc	nc	nc	nc	nc	nc	nc	nc

nc = not competed

European Championship

Year	1992	1995	1997	1999	2001	2003	2005	2007	2009	2011	2013	2015	2017	2019	2021	2022	2024	2025
Standing	nc	nc	nc	nc	17th	nc	nc	20th	17th	nc	nc	14th	nc	nc	nc	nc	nc	nc

nc = not competed
