= Uganda women's national softball team =

Information
- Country: Uganda
- Federation: Uganda Baseball and Softball Association
- Confederation: WBSC Africa
- WBSC World Rank: 53 (31 December 2025)

Women's Softball World Cup
- Appearances: 1 (First in 2016)
- Best result: 23rd

Uganda women's national softball team is the national team for Uganda.

== History ==
The history of the Uganda women's national softball team dates back to the qualification of an Ugandan team for the 2011 World Series of the Little League Softball World Series in Pennsylvania but was unable to due to visa issues. Residents from their supposed opponents Langley organized a fundraiser to take the team to Canada in 2012. This later results to the establishment of a national team program led by Softball B.C. coaching director Joni Frei who became the Ugandan team's head coach.

Uganda made their debut at the Women's Softball World Championship at the 2016 edition in Surrey, Canada. The team's stint was funded by donations from Austria, Canada, and the United States.

Uganda participated at the 2019 Softball Africa Cup in South Africa which was a qualifier for the 2020 Summer Olympics.

Uganda later took part at the 2026 WBSC Africa Women's Softball Continental Championship. They defeated Kenya in the play-off to earn the second berth in the 2027 Women's Softball World Cup (formerly the World Championship). However Uganda withdrew with the Philippines replacing them.
