= 2026 U-12 Asian Baseball Championship =

Tournament details
- Country: China
- Dates: August 9 – 15
- Teams: 8
- Defending champions: Chinese Taipei

Final positions
- Champions: Japan (2nd title)
- Runners-up: Chinese Taipei
- Third place: South Korea
- Fourth place: China

Tournament statistics
- Games played: 22

The 2026 U-12 Asian Baseball Championship is the 12th edition of the U-12 Asian Baseball Championship, organised by Asia's governing baseball body, the WBSC Asia. The tournament is held in Hangzhou, China from 9 to 15 August 2026. The top three teams of the tournament will qualify for the 2027 U-12 Baseball World Cup.

== Participating teams ==
- China
- Chinese Taipei
- Hong Kong
- Japan
- Pakistan
- Philippines
- South Korea
- Thailand

== Opening round ==
=== Group A ===
Pos	Team	Pld	W	L	RF	RA	PCT	GB	Qualification
1	Japan	3	3	0	50	4	1.000	—	Advance to Super Round
2	China (H)	3	2	1	35	10	.667	1	Advance to Super Round
3	Philippines	3	1	2	13	29	.333	2	Advance to Placement round
4	Pakistan	3	0	3	3	58	.000	3	Advance to Placement round

Source: WBSC Asia
(H) Hosts

Date	Local time	Road team	Score	Home team	Inn.	Venue	Game duration	Attendance	Boxscore
Aug 10, 2026	13:30	Philippines	1–11	Japan	5	Guali Baseball Field	1:40	89	Boxscore
Aug 10, 2026	19:30	Pakistan	1–16	China	4	Guali Baseball Field	1:37	80	Boxscore
Aug 11, 2026	12:30	Japan	32–0	Pakistan	4	Guali Baseball Field	1:36	120	Boxscore
Aug 11, 2026	15:30	Philippines	2–16	China	5	Guali Baseball Field	1:55	78	Boxscore
Aug 12, 2026	12:30	Pakistan	2–10	Philippines	6	Guali Baseball Field	1:43	89	Boxscore
Aug 12, 2026	18:30	China	3–7	Japan	6	Guali Baseball Field	1:27	500	Boxscore

=== Group B ===
Pos	Team	Pld	W	L	RF	RA	PCT	GB	Qualification
1	Chinese Taipei	3	3	0	48	2	1.000	—	Advance to Super Round
2	South Korea	3	2	1	29	3	.667	1	Advance to Super Round
3	Hong Kong	3	1	2	11	43	.333	2	Advance to Placement round
4	Thailand	3	0	3	7	47	.000	3	Advance to Placement round

Source: WBSC Asia

Date	Local time	Road team	Score	Home team	Inn.	Venue	Game duration	Attendance	Boxscore
Aug 10, 2026	15:30	Chinese Taipei	23–1	Hong Kong	4	Guali Baseball Field	1:59	90	Boxscore
Aug 10, 2026	17:30	Thailand	0–15	South Korea	4	Guali Baseball Field	1:46	80	Boxscore
Aug 11, 2026	9:30	Hong Kong	10–7	Thailand	6	Guali Baseball Field	2:42	98	Boxscore
Aug 11, 2026	18:30	South Korea	1–3	Chinese Taipei	6	Guali Baseball Field	2:22	80	Boxscore
Aug 12, 2026	9:30	Thailand	0–22	Chinese Taipei	4	Guali Baseball Field	1:22	90	Boxscore
Aug 12, 2026	15:30	Hong Kong	0–13	South Korea	5	Guali Baseball Field	1:39	90	Boxscore

== Placement round ==
Pos	Team	Pld	W	L	RF	RA	PCT	GB
1	Philippines	3	3	0	20	4	1.000	—
2	Hong Kong	3	2	1	21	19	.667	1
3	Pakistan	3	1	2	16	25	.333	2
4	Thailand	3	0	3	13	22	.000	3

Source: WBSC Asia

Date	Local time	Road team	Score	Home team	Inn.	Venue	Game duration	Attendance	Boxscore
Aug 13, 2026	9:30	Thailand	5–6	Pakistan	6	Guali Baseball Field	2:02	20	Boxscore
Aug 13, 2026	12:30	Philippines	4–1	Hong Kong	6	Guali Baseball Field	1:55	80	Boxscore
Aug 14, 2026	9:30	Pakistan	8–10	Hong Kong	6	Guali Baseball Field	2:02	60	Boxscore
Aug 14, 2026	12:30	Thailand	1–6	Philippines	6	Guali Baseball Field	1:38	98	Boxscore

== Super round ==
Pos	Team	Pld	W	L	RF	RA	PCT	GB	Qualification
1	Japan	3	3	0	16	9	1.000	—	Advance to final
2	Chinese Taipei	3	2	1	15	8	.667	1	Advance to final
3	China (H)	3	1	2	9	16	.333	2	Advance to third-place game
4	South Korea	3	0	3	4	11	.000	3	Advance to third-place game

Source: WBSC Asia
(H) Hosts

Date	Local time	Road team	Score	Home team	Inn.	Venue	Game duration	Attendance	Boxscore
Aug 13, 2026	15:30	China	5–2	South Korea	6	Guali Baseball Field	1:34	120	Boxscore
Aug 13, 2026	18:30	Chinese Taipei	5–6	Japan	6	Guali Baseball Field	2:05	120	Boxscore
Aug 14, 2026	15:30	China	1–7	Chinese Taipei	6	Guali Baseball Field	1:43	198	Boxscore
Aug 14, 2026	18:30	South Korea	1–3	Japan	6	Guali Baseball Field	1:45	90	Boxscore

== Finals ==
=== Third-place game ===
Date	Local time	Road team	Score	Home team	Inn.	Venue	Game duration	Attendance	Boxscore
Aug 15, 2026	15:30	South Korea	4–0	China	6	Guali Baseball Field	1:45	150	Boxscore

=== Final ===
Date	Local time	Road team	Score	Home team	Inn.	Venue	Game duration	Attendance	Boxscore
Aug 154, 2026	18:30	Chinese Taipei	0–3	Japan	6	Guali Baseball Field	1:34	80	Boxscore

== Final standing ==
Rank	Team
1st place, gold medalist(s)	Japan
2nd place, silver medalist(s)	Chinese Taipei
3rd place, bronze medalist(s)	South Korea
4	China
5	Philippines
6	Hong Kong
7	Pakistan
8	Thailand

Qualified for the 2027 U-12 World Cup

== External websites ==
- Official website
