= Amateur Softball Association of the Philippines =

- Sport: Softball
- Abbreviation: ASA-PHIL
- Affiliation: International Softball Federation
- Headquarters: Makati
- Location: Caniogan, Pasig
- President: Jean Henri Lhuillier

Official website
- asaphil.com.ph
- (Philippines)

The Amateur Softball Association of the Philippines (ASA-PHIL) is the national governing body for softball in the Philippines. It is accredited by the International Softball Federation which is the governing body for the sport of softball in the world. It currently manages the men's and women's national teams for softball, the Blu Boys and Blu Girls.
