= 2017 Asian Women's Softball Championship =

Women's softball tournament

Tournament details
- Host country: Taiwan
- Dates: 29 November–4 December 2017
- Teams: 12
- Defending champions: Japan

Final positions
- Champions: Japan (6th title)
- Runner-up: Philippines
- Third place: Chinese Taipei
- Fourth place: China

The 2017 Asian Women's Softball Championship was an international softball tournament which featured twelve nations and was held from 29 November–4 December 2017 in Taichung, Taiwan.

The top five teams qualified for the 2018 Asian Games while the top three teams qualified for the 2018 Women's Softball World Championship

Japan won the championship by winning 7–0 over the Philippines. With Japan already qualified as host, fourth placers, China qualified for the 2018 Women's Softball World Championship along with the Philippines and third-placers, Chinese Taipei.

== Participants ==
- China
- Hong Kong
- Indonesia
- India
- Japan
- South Korea
- Philippines
- Singapore
- Thailand
- Chinese Taipei (hosts)
- Iran - Withdraw
- Pakistan - Withdraw

== Preliminary round ==
=== Group A ===
Teams	W	L	Pct.	GB
Japan	5	0	1.000	–
Philippines	4	1	.800	1
South Korea	3	2	.600	2
Hong Kong	2	3	.400	3
Thailand	1	4	.200	4
Pakistan	0	5	.000	5

=== Group B ===
Teams	W	L	Pct.	GB
Chinese Taipei	5	0	1.000	–
China	4	1	.800	1
Indonesia	3	2	.600	2
Singapore	2	3	.400	3
India	1	4	.200	4
Iran	0	5	.000	5

== Final round ==
Qualifying finals
1	Japan	7
8	Chinese Taipei	7
2	South Korea	7
7	Indonesia	3
3	Hong Kong	4
6	Singapore	0
4	Philippines	3
5	China	0

Semifinals
4W	Hong Kong	0
2L	Philippines	17
3W	South Korea	1
1L	China	4

Preliminary finals
1W	Japan	2
Chinese Taipei	0
2W	China	3
Philippines	4

Third place
Chinese Taipei	3
Philippines	5

Final
Japan	7
Philippines	0

5th place match
South Korea	12
Hong Kong	1

=== Final ===
Team	1	2	3	4	5	R	H
Japan	1	0	5	1	0	7	7
Philippines	0	0	0	0	0	0	0
Boxscore

== Final standings ==
Qualified for: 2018 Women's Softball World Championship (including hosts, Japan); 2018 Asian Games
Qualified for: 2018 Asian Games (including hosts, Indonesia)

Rank	Team
Gold medal	Japan
Silver medal	Philippines
Bronze medal	Chinese Taipei
4th	China
5th	South Korea
6th	Hong Kong
7th	Indonesia
7th	Singapore
9th	Thailand
9th	India
11th	Pakistan
11th	Iran

Source:World Baseball Softball Confederation

== See also ==
- List of sporting events in Taiwan
