= India women's national softball team =

Information
- Country: India
- Federation: Softball Association of India
- Confederation: Softball Confederation of Asia
- WBSC World Rank: 38th

Women's Softball World Cup
- Appearances: 1 (First in 2016)
- Best result: 29th

The India women's national softball team is the national softball team of India in international-level softball competitions.

== Tournament history ==
=== Women's Softball World Championship ===
- 2016 Women's Softball World Championship - 29th

=== Asian Women's Softball Championship ===
Women's Softball Asia Cup

- 1967-1987: DNE
- 1991 Asian Women's Softball Championship - 12th
- 1995 Asian Women's Softball Championship - 8th
- 1999 Asian Women's Softball Championship - 10th
- 2004 Asian Women's Softball Championship - 12th
- 2007: DNE
- 2011 Asian Women's Softball Championship - 10th
- 2017 Asian Women's Softball Championship - 9th
- 2019 Asian Women's Softball Championship - 10th
- 2023 Women's Softball Asia Cup - 9th
- 2025 Women's Softball Asia Cup - 9th

=== Results ===
Year	Rank	M	W	L	RF	RA	RD
1967	DNE	–	–	–	–	–	–
1969	DNE	–	–	–	–	–	–
1972	DNE	–	–	–	–	–	–
1987	DNE	–	–	–	–	–	–
1991	12th	0	0	0	0	0	0
1995	8th	0	0	0	0	0	0
1999	10th	0	0	0	0	0	0
2004	12th	0	0	0	0	0	0
2007	DNE	-	-	-	-	-	-
2011	10th	5	1	4	11	47	-36
2017	9th	4	0	4	1	55	-54
2019	10th	4	0	4	0	54	-54
2023	9th	8	0	8	2	96	-94
2025	9th	9	1	8	9	96	–87
Total	9/14	30	2	28	23	348	-325
