= Austria women's national softball team =

Austria women's national softball team is the national team for Austria. The team competed at the 1994 ISF Women's World Championship in St. John's, Newfoundland where they finished twenty-seventh. The governing body is the Austrian Baseball Softball Federation.
