= Zimbabwe women's national softball team =

Zimbabwe women's national softball team is the national team for Zimbabwe. The team competed at the 1986 ISF Women's World Championship in Auckland, New Zealand where they finished twelfth. The team competed at the 1990 ISF Women's World Championship in Normal, Illinois where they finished with 0 wins and 9 losses.
