= Bahamas women's national softball team =

Bahamas women's national softball team is the national team for Bahamas. The team competed at the 1990 ISF Women's World Championship in Normal, Illinois where they finished with 4 wins and 5 losses. The team competed at the 1994 ISF Women's World Championship in St. John's, Newfoundland where they finished fourteenth.
