= Ukraine women's national softball team =

Ukraine women's national softball team is the national team for Ukraine. The team competed at the 1994 ISF Women's World Championship in St. John's, Newfoundland where they finished twenty-sixth. They have not qualified since.

The women's team competed at the 2019 Women's European Softball Championships, finishing 20th.
