= Philippines women's national softball team =

Philippines

Information
- Country: Philippines
- Federation: Amateur Softball Association of the Philippines
- Confederation: WBSC Asia
- Manager: Ana Santiago
- WBSC World Rank: 13 ▲3 (31 December 2025)

Women's Softball World Cup
- Appearances: 8 (First in 1970)
- Best result: (bronze) 3rd (1 time, in 1970)

Asian Games
- Appearances: 6 (First in 1998)
- Best result: 4th (3 times, in 2014, 2018 and 2022)

Asian Championship
- Appearances: 16 (First in 1967)
- Best result: (gold) 1st (1 time, in 1972)

Southeast Asian Games
- Appearances: 11 (first in 1979)
- Best result: (gold) 1st (11 times, most recent in 2025)

The Philippines women's national softball team, nicknamed the Blu Girls, is the national team of Philippines. They are governed by the Amateur Softball Association of the Philippines. They won a bronze medal in 1970 ISF Women's World Championship in Osaka, Japan and it was their first medal won in a World Championship.

The Philippines is among the best teams in Southeast Asia having won the gold medal in every edition of the Southeast Asian Games which had women's softball event.

== History ==
The Philippine women's team were a powerhouse in Asia never placing outside the top 10 in the global rankings during the 1970s although the Philippines always ranked behind Japan. Their greatest achievement at that time was the third-place finish at the Women's Softball World Championship in 1970. They placed fourth in the 1974 edition.

They are also a dominant force in Southeast Asia, having won all the gold medals in all editions of the Southeast Asian Games where women's softball was contested.

However, by the 1990s, the Philippine national team experienced a decline. The team competed at the 1990 ISF Women's World Championship in Normal, Illinois where they finished with 4 wins and 5 losses. At the 1998 ISF Women's World Championship in Fujinomiya City, Japan where they finished sixteenth and only managed to secure a single win. The policy of the Philippine Sports Commission of dismantling the national training pool whenever a particular sport was scrapped from the calendar of events of the Southeast Asian Games, Asian Games, and the Olympics contributed to the women's softball team's decline.

In the 2000s, Raul Saberon, a businessman and a former men's national softball and baseball player, secured financial support for the women's softball team from Jean Henri Lhuillier, who later became head of the Amateur Softball Association of the Philippines.The team made a failed attempt to qualify for the 2006 Asian Games in Doha and the 2008 Summer Olympics in Beijing though made some progress.

At the 2017 Asian Women's Softball Championship, the Philippines finished second to Japan, the best finish of the country in 45 years. In doing so, they qualified for the Women's Softball World Championship and Asian Games in 2018.

The Philippines clinched their tenth straight SEA Games title in the 2019 edition of the regional games before the COVID-19 pandemic disrupted the program. By around the 2023, the rebuilding process of the Philippine national team began.

== Roster ==
National squad for the 2014 World Cup of Softball, July 7–13, 2014.

Head Coach: Randy Dizer

No.	Name	Position
1	Veronica Belleza	Pitcher
2	Whell Ghene Camral	Outfield, Infield
4	Annalie Benjamen	Pitcher
6	Marlyn Francisco	Outfield, Infield
8	Angelie Ursabia	Outfield, Infield
9	Francesca Altomonte	Catcher, Infield
10	Garie Blando	Outfield, Infield
11	Francesca Foti	Pitcher
12	Lorna Adorable	Outfield
17	Luzviminda Embudo	Outfield, Infield
19	Alexandra Louise Zuluaga	Infield
26	Arianne Vallestero	Infield
30	Dani Gilmore	Catcher
31	Gabrielle Rodas	Outfield
33	Morgan Stuart	Infield
38	Rizza Bernardino	Pitcher
88	Elma Parohinog	Outfield
-	Alleah Laxamana	Infield
-	Isabella Ann Mendoza	Outfield
-	Jaexenne Balilea	Infield
-	Jullian Tanaka	Outfield, Infield
-	Kriska Piad	Catcher, Infield
-	Leia Ruiz	Infield
-	Staca, Lopez, Galido, Sanchez	DH, JRs

National squad for the 2017 World Cup of Softball, July 5–9, 2017.

Head Coach: Randy Dizer

Player #	Name	Position(s)
1	Garie Blando	Infield
3	Kayla Joyce	Outfield
4	Gabrielle Maurice	Outfield
5	Skylynne Ellazar	Infield
7	Riflayca Basa	Pitcher
7	Shaira Damasing	Catcher
8	Francesca Altomonte	Catcher
9	Kailey Hill	Pitcher
12	Lorna Adorable	Outfield
13	Chelsea Suitos	Infield
14	Sierra Lange	Pitcher
15	Cristy Roa	Outfield
19	Angelie Ursabia	Infield/OF
20	Mia Macapagal	Pitcher
21	Dione Macasu	Pitcher
22	Ma. Celestine Palma	Catcher
24	Dani Gilmore	Outfield
25	Reese Guevarra	Outfield
26	Arianne Vallestero	OF/IF
28	Riezel Calumbres	Infield
32	Hailey Decker	Infield
33	Kailey Cuico	Infield
42	Mary Luisse Garde	Pitcher
53	Lovely Arago	Infield
91	Lyca Basa	Pitcher

== Competition results ==
=== World Cup ===
World Cup Record (Note: World Championship until 2018)
Year	Position
(Australia) 1965	Did not participate
(Japan) 1970	3rd place
(United States) 1974	4th place
(El Salvador) 1978	Did not participate
(Taiwan) 1982	5th place
(New Zealand) 1986	Did not participate
(United States) 1990	12th place
(Japan) 1994	Did not participate
(Japan) 1998	16th place
(Canada) 2002	Did not participate
(China) 2006	Did not participate
(Venezuela) 2010	Did not participate
(Canada) 2012	Did not participate
(Netherlands) 2014	Did not participate
(Canada) 2016	14th place
(Japan) 2018	14th place
(United States) 2022 (Note: The World Games tournament also serves as the World Championship)	Did not qualify
(Republic of Ireland) (Italy) (Spain) 2024	12th place
(Australia) (Czech Republic) (Peru) (United States) 2027	Qualified
Total	8/19

=== USA Softball International Cup ===
USA Softball International Cup Record (Note: World Cup of Softball until 2017)
Year	Position
2005–2013	Did not participate
2014	6th place
2015	Did not participate
2016	6th place
2017	7th place
2018	Did not participate
2019	8th place
Total	4/13

=== Asia Cup ===
Asia Cup Record
Year	Position
(Philippines) 1967	2nd place
(Taiwan) 1969	2nd place
(Philippines) 1972	1st place
(Japan) 1987	4th place
(Indonesia) 1991	4th place
(Philippines) 1995	4th place
(China) 1999	Below 4th place
(Philippines) 2004	5th place
(Indonesia) 2007	4th place
(Taiwan) 2011	4th place
(Taiwan) 2017	2nd place
(Indonesia) 2019	4th place
(South Korea) 2023	4th place
(China) 2025	4th place
Total	16/16

=== Asian Games ===
Asian Games Record
Year	Position
(China) 1990	Did not participate
(Japan) 1994	Did not participate
(Thailand) 1998	6th place
(South Korea) 2002	6th place
(Qatar) 2006	Did not participate
(China) 2010	5th place
(South Korea) 2014	4th place
(Indonesia) 2018	4th place
(China) 2022	4th place
(Japan) 2026	Qualified
Total	6/9

=== Southeast Asian Games ===
Southeast Asian Games Record
Year	Position
(Indonesia) 1979	1st place
(Philippines) 1981	1st place
(Singapore) 1983	Not held
(Thailand) 1985	Not held
(Indonesia) 1987	1st place
(Malaysia) 1989	Not held
(Philippines) 1991	1st place
(Singapore) 1993	Not held
(Thailand) 1995	Not held
(Indonesia) 1997	1st place
(Brunei) 1999	Not held
(Malaysia) 2001	Not held
(Vietnam) 2003	Not held
(Philippines) 2005	1st place
(Thailand) 2007	1st place
(Laos) 2009	Not held
(Indonesia) 2011	1st place
(Myanmar) 2013	Not held
(Singapore) 2015	1st place
(Malaysia) 2017	Not held
(Philippines) 2019	1st place
(Vietnam) 2021	Not held
(Cambodia) 2023	Not held
(Thailand) 2025	1st place
Total	11 gold

== Honors ==
PSC Women in Sports Awards

- Citation: 2025
