= Women's Softball World Cup =

International women's softball tournament

- Current season, competition or edition: 2027 Women's Softball World Cup
- Sport: Softball
- Founded: 1965; 61 years ago
- No. of teams: 16 (finals)
- Continent: International
- Most recent champions: Japan (4th title) (2024)
- Most titles: United States (12 titles)

The Women's Softball World Cup is a fastpitch softball tournament for women's national teams held historically every four years, now every two years, by the World Baseball Softball Confederation (WBSC). The tournament, originally known as the ISF Women's World Championship, was sanctioned by the International Softball Federation (ISF) until that body's 2013 merger with the International Baseball Federation to create the WBSC. The number of teams in the tournament began at five in its inaugural event in 1965, went to a high of 28 for the 1994 edition, and now the WBSC Code legislates that the maximum number of teams that may participate is 16. There are qualifying tournaments that determine which countries will play at the World Cup.

== History ==
A women's softball world championship predates the ISF's event. A championship was held in Canada between several American and Canadian teams in 1952 and 1953. Australia had also hosted an international tournament that predated the first Women's World Championship.

In 1965, the first ISF Women's World Championship was held in Melbourne, with games being played at Albert Park. Five nations competed at the inaugural championships including the United States, Japan and Australia, which Australia won 1–0 in a final game against the United States. In the game, Australia was held to only two hits while the United States had four. Lorraine Woolley was named the player of the tournament. The inaugural men's championship would occur one year later in Mexico.

In 1970, ten countries participated. The Japanese won competition after having twelve consecutive wins and beating the Americans 3–0 in a final game spectated by 30,000 people.

In 1974, the Americans knocked out the Australians during the semi-finals, when they beat them by a score of 6–0.

Taiwan's leadership discussed inviting China to compete at the 1982 competition which was the country was hosting. Ching-khou and Wang Shen supported mainland China's participation in the event and an invitation was issued but the Chinese government elected to not send a team.

The 1990 edition was the seventh to be held, with six countries having played hosts to the competition.

Teams that competed in 1990 included the US, New Zealand, China, Australia, Chinese Taipei, Japan, Canada, Italy, Netherlands, Cuba, Puerto Rico, Philippines, Bahamas, Netherlands Antilles, Mexico, Aruba, Bermuda, Indonesia, Argentina, and Zimbabwe. The United States took home gold, New Zealand silver and China bronze. The Soviet Union had a representative attend the 1990 competition and promise that a Soviet side would be competing at the next championships.

The 2006 edition was very important as the Championships were used for Olympic qualifying, with the top four finishers going to the Olympic Games. In 2006, the fourth-place finishers automatically qualified to the Games because China was the Olympic Games based on that. Thus, there was a battle for fifth place between Canada and Italy for Olympic qualifications. In the match for fifth, Canada won 3-0 and earned their fourth consecutive trip to the Olympics.

A world championships is just as tough as any Olympics you attend, the only thing different is at the Olympics you just don't have the same magnitude of hype around it.

— Kere Johanson, Australian softball national team coach

Teams that will be competing at the 2012 edition include Australia, Canada and Japan who will play in the same pool. The competition was scheduled to act as a replacement for the Olympics.

== Results ==
Australia won the competition in 1965. The victory was considered very impressive as they beat the Americans, who invented the game in 1887, to win the championship. Japan won in 1970, while the 1974 and 1978 editions were won by the United States, the American side also won seven championships in a row from 1988 to 2010, with the USA's most recent victory being a 3–2 win over Japan in the finals in 2022. Other countries that have won it include Japan in 1970, 2012, 2014, and 2024 and New Zealand in 1982. Teams that have finished second include the US in 1965, 1970, 2012 2014, and 2024, Japan in 1974, 2002, 2006 and 2010, Canada in 1978, Taiwan in 1982, China in 1986 and 1994, New Zealand in 1990, and Australia in 1998. Countries that have finished third include the Philippines in 1970, China in 1990 and Chinese Taipei in 2002 and 2022.

Ed.	Years	Final hosts	Finalists			Semi-finalists			Teams
Ed.	Years	Final hosts	Champions	Score	Runners-up	3rd place	Score	4th place	Teams
1	1965; Details	(Australia); Melbourne	Australia	1–0	United States	Japan	3–2	New Zealand	5
2	1970; Details	(Japan); Osaka	Japan	1–0	United States	Philippines	1–0	Australia	9
3	1974; Details	(United States); Stratford	United States	3–0	Japan	Australia	4–0	Philippines	15
4	1978; Details	(El Salvador); San Salvador	United States	4–0	Canada	New Zealand	4–2	Taiwan	15
5	1982; Details	(Taiwan); Taipei	New Zealand	2–0	Chinese Taipei	Australia	—N/a	United States	23
6	1986; Details	(New Zealand); Auckland	United States	2–0	China	New Zealand	—N/a	Canada	12
7	1990; Details	(United States); Normal	United States	*	New Zealand	China	—N/a	Australia	20
8	1994; Details	(Canada); St. John's	United States	6–0	China	Australia	—N/a	Canada	28
9	1998; Details	(Japan); Fujinomiya	United States	1–0	Australia	Japan	—N/a	China	17
10	2002; Details	(Canada); Saskatoon	United States	1–0	Japan	Chinese Taipei	—N/a	China	16
11	2006; Details	(China); Beijing	United States	3–0	Japan	Australia	—N/a	China	15
12	2010; Details	(Venezuela); Caracas	United States	7–0	Japan	Canada	—N/a	China	16
13	2012; Details	(Canada); Whitehorse	Japan	2–1 (F/10)	United States	Australia	—N/a	Canada	16
14	2014; Details	(Netherlands); Haarlem	Japan	4–1	United States	Australia	—N/a	Canada	16
15	2016; Details	(Canada); Surrey	United States	7–3	Japan	Canada	9–2	Netherlands	31
16	2018; Details	(Japan); Chiba	United States	7–6 (F/10)	Japan	Canada	12–0	Australia	16
	2022; Details	(United States); Birmingham	United States	3–2	Japan	Chinese Taipei	6–0	Australia	8
17	2024; Details	(Italy); Castions di Strada & Buttrio	Japan	6–1	United States	Canada	11–7	Netherlands	18
18	2027; Details	(Australia); Redcliffe							18

* 1990: Rain washed out the grand final, leading USA to win based on its record in round-robin play.

Notes

1. The 2022 World Games counts toward titles and appearances, but not toward the World Cup edition count. The 2024 tournament was the 17th edition.

== Medal table ==
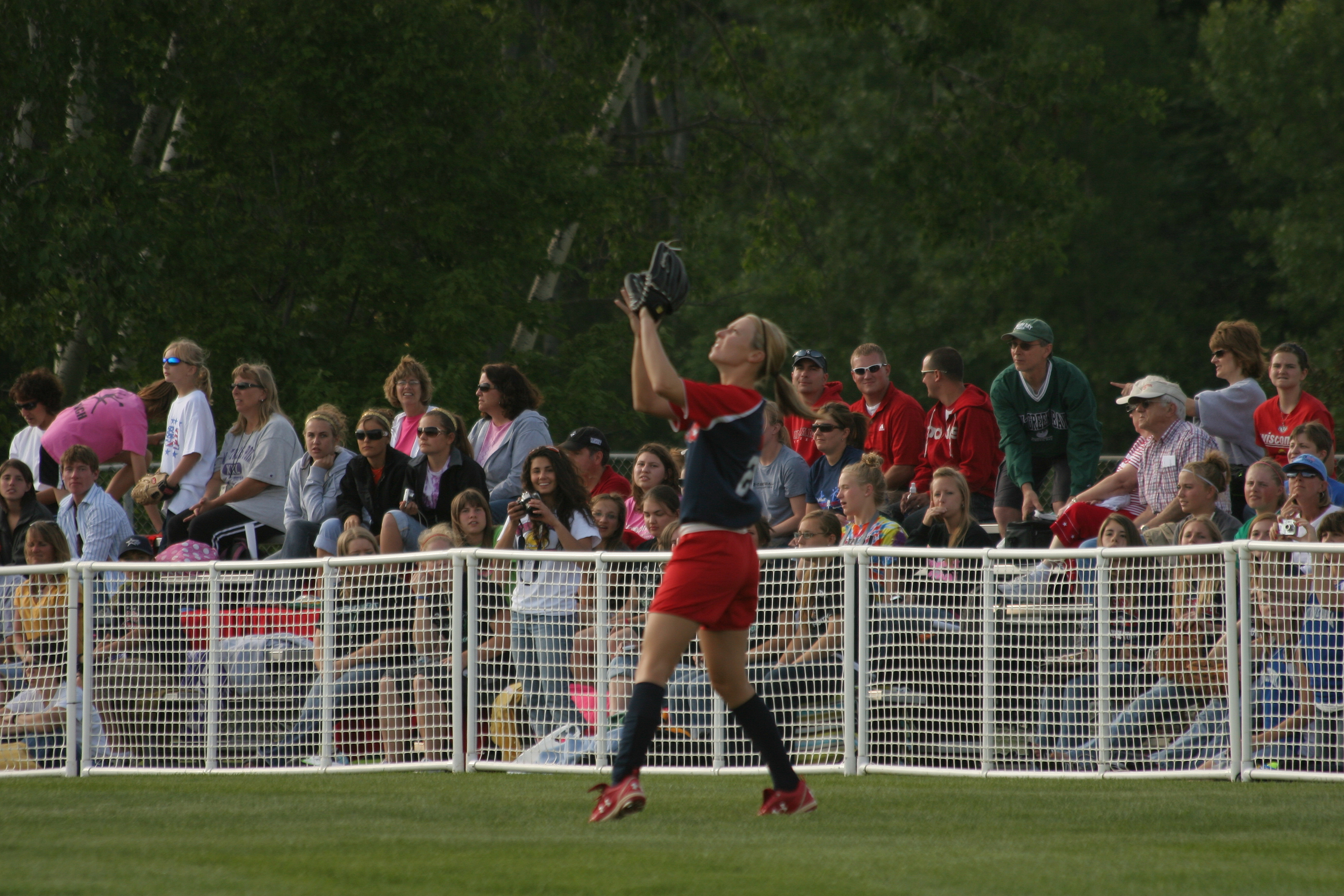
Laura Berg won the competition four times as part of the United States women's national softball team.

Rank	Nation	Gold	Silver	Bronze	Total
1	United States	12	5	0	17
2	Japan	4	7	2	13
3	Australia	1	1	6	8
4	New Zealand	1	1	2	4
5	China	0	2	1	3
6	Canada	0	1	4	5
7	Chinese Taipei	0	1	2	3
8	Philippines	0	0	1	1
Totals (8 entries)		18	18	18	54

== Hosting ==
The 1970 edition was hosted by Japan in Osaka. The 1974 edition was played in Stratford, United States. The 1978 games were played in San Salvador, El Salvador. The 1982 competition was hosted by in Chinese Taipei in Taipei. The 1986 edition was hosted by New Zealand and held in Auckland. In 1990, the competition was played in Normal, Illinois. The 1994 edition was played in St. John's, Newfoundland. Japan hosted the 1998 competition in Fujinomiya. The 2002 Championships were held in Saskatoon, Canada. China hosted the 2006 Championships in Beijing. The 2010 edition was hosted by Venezuela. The 2012 championship took place in Whitehorse, Yukon, Canada. The 2014 championships were held in Haarlem, Netherlands. The 2016 tournament was held in Surrey, British Columbia. The 2018 tournament was held in Chiba, Japan. The 2022 tournament was held in Birmingham, Alabama. The 2024 tournament was held in Castions di Strada and Buttrio, Italy.

== Participating nations ==
Team	1965	1970	1974	1978	1982	1986	1990	1994	1998	2002	2006	2010	2012	2014	2016	2018	2022	2024	2027	Years
Argentina							19th	21st				14th	14th							4
Aruba							16th													1
Australia	1st	4th	3rd	5th	3rd	8th	4th	3rd	2nd	5th	3rd	6th	3rd	3rd	10th	4th	4th	8th	q	19
Austria								27th							18th					2
Bahamas				7th	12th		13th	14th												4
Belgium					13th			13th												2
Belize				9th																1
Bermuda			11th		11th		17th	24th												4
Botswana								20th			14th	16th		14th		16th		18th		6
Brazil															11th				q	1
Canada		8th	7th	2nd	8th	4th	7th	4th	5th	9th	5th	3rd	4th	4th	3rd	3rd	6th	3rd	q	18
China						2nd	3rd	2nd	4th	4th	4th	4th	5th	7th	8th	10th		5th	q	13
Chinese Taipei		6th	5th	4th	2nd	6th	5th	5th	7th	3rd	8th	7th	7th	5th	12th	9th	3rd	16th	q	18
Colombia					17th			17th	12th		w									3
Croatia								28th												1
Cuba							10th	10th				9th		12th	16th			14th	q	7
Czech Republic								18th	11th	15th		10th	9th	10th	17th				q	8
Denmark									17th											1
Dominican Republic					16th					16th		16th		11th						4
Ecuador															22nd					1
El Salvador				10th	6th															2
France								22nd							23rd					2
Great Britain								23rd			10th	11th	13th	16th	13th	11th		15th	q	9
Greece											9th				19th					2
Guam					18th															1
Guatemala				12th	10th										20th					3
India															29th					1
Indonesia					19th	11th	18th													3
Israel															30th					1
Ireland															26th			17th		2
Italy			8th	8th		10th	8th	11th	6th	7th	6th		10th	9th	15th	7th	7th	7th	q	15
Japan	3rd	1st	2nd			9th	6th	7th	3rd	2nd	2nd	2nd	1st	1st	2nd	2nd	2nd	1st	q	17
Kenya															27th					1
Malaysia					20th															1
Mexico		5th	12th				15th						16th		5th	6th	8th		q	8
Moldova								25th												1
Nauru					22nd															1
Netherlands Antilles							14th	12th	10th	12th										4
Netherlands			6th	6th	7th	7th	9th	8th	9th	11th	12th	8th	6th	6th	4th	8th		4th	q	16
New Zealand	4th	7th	9th	3rd	1st	3rd	2nd	6th	13th	6th	11th	12th	12th	8th	7th	13th		11th	q	18
(Territory of New Guinea) New Guinea	5th																			1
Nicaragua				15th	14th															2
North Korea											13th									1
Pakistan															31st					1
Panama				13th	15th															2
Peru															21st				q	2
Philippines		3rd	4th		5th		12th		16th						14th	14th		10th	q	8
Puerto Rico			13th	11th		5th	11th	9th		8th			8th	15th	9th	5th	5th	6th	q	13
Russia										13th				13th						2
Serbia															25th					1
Singapore					23rd															1
South Africa			10th						15th	14th	15th	15th	15th			15th		12th	w	8
South Korea								15th	14th											2
Spain								19th										13th		2
Sweden					21st			16th												2
Switzerland															28th					1
Uganda															24th				w	1
Ukraine								26th												1
United States	2nd	2nd	1st	1st	4th	1st	1st	1st	1st	1st	1st	1st	2nd	2nd	1st	1st	1st	2nd	q	19
U.S. Virgin Islands			14th																	1
Venezuela			15th		9th				8th	10th	7th	5th	11th		6th	12th		9th	q	11
Zambia		9th		14th																2
Zimbabwe						12th	20th													2
Total: 63 countries	5	9	15	15	23	12	20	28	17	16	16	16	16	16	31	16	8	18	18	

q: Qualified, w: Withdrew

== See also ==
- Softball at the Summer Olympics
- Softball at the World Games
