= North Korea women's national softball team =

North Korea

Information
- Country: North Korea
- Confederation: WBSC Asia
- WBSC World Rank: NR (31 December 2025)

Women's Softball World Cup
- Appearances: 1 (First in 2006)

USA Softball International Cup
- Appearances: 3 (First in 2014)

North Korea women's national softball team represents North Korea in international women's softball competitions. The team competed at the 2006 ISF Women's World Championship in Beijing, China, where they finished thirteenth.

In 1990, the North Korean women's softball team faced South Korea for the first time in the Beijing Asian Games, following North Korea's boycott of the Seoul Olympics and the Seoul Asian Games. When fans of both teams met, they cheered for political reunification.

In 2001, North Korea won only one game and finished fifth among six teams during the Asian qualifying round for the 2002 World Women's Softball Championships. Afterwards, the team brought in a coach from Cuba to train the team, "surprising" World No.2-ranked Japan at the championships with an outstanding performance from pitcher Kim Song, who allowed only one run.
