= Thailand women's national softball team =

Information
- Country: Thailand
- Federation: Softball Association of Thailand
- Confederation: WBSC Asia
- WBSC World Rank: 52 ▼3 (31 December 2024)

The Thailand women's national softball team is the national team of Thailand in women's international softball competition. It is governed by the Softball Association of Thailand (SBAT) and are a full member of WBSC Asia. They have competed at the Southeast Asian Games, Asian Games and the Asian Women's Softball Championship.

== History ==
Thailand competed in the 2023 Women's Softball Asia Cup. They finished 8th out of 9 teams, winning 1 game, losing 5, with 1 tie.

They competed in the 2025 Women's Softball Asia Cup, this time finishing 8th of 10. They beat India 4–3 and Malaysia 8–1.

== Competition results ==
=== Asian Games ===
Asian Games record
Year	Result	Rank	W	L	RS	RA
(Thailand) 1998	Round Robin	7th	0	6	2	62
(South Korea) 2002	did not participate					
(Qatar) 2006	did not participate					
(China) 2010	Preliminary Round	6th	0	5	2	40
(South Korea) 2014	Preliminary Round	6th	0	5	2	47
(Indonesia) 2018	did not participate					
(China) 2022	Placement Round	8th	0	5	3	49
Total			0	21	9	198

=== SEA Games ===
SEA Games record
Year	Result	Rank	W	L	RS	RA
(Philippines) 2005	Bronze	3rd	2	4	20	27
(Thailand) 2007	Bronze	3rd	1	4	8	18
(Indonesia) 2011	Silver	2nd	3	4	23	38
(Singapore) 2015	Silver	2nd	4	3	41	40
(Philippines) 2019	Preliminary Round	5th	0	4	5	23
(Thailand) 2025	Bronze	3rd	3	2	16	30
Total			13	21	108	176
