= Japan women's national softball team =

Japan

Information
- Country: Japan
- Federation: Japan Softball Association (JSA)
- Confederation: WBSC Asia
- Manager: Reika Utsugi
- WBSC World Rank: 1 (31 December 2025)

Olympic Games
- Appearances: 5 (First in 1996)
- Best result: (gold) 1st (2 times, most recent in 2020)

Women's Softball World Cup
- Appearances: 18 (First in 1965)
- Best result: (gold) 1st (4 times, most recent in 2024)

Asian Games
- Appearances: 9 (First in 1990)
- Best result: (gold) 1st (6 times, most recent in 2022)

Asian Championship
- Appearances: 10 (First in 1967)
- Best result: (gold) 1st (6 times, most recent in 2017)

The Japan women's national softball team is the national team of Japan in international softball competitions. It is governed by the Japan Softball Association. They are currently ranked #1 in the world by the World Baseball Softball Confederation. The team won gold in the 2020 Summer Olympics, after a 2-0 victory over the United States in the final. Women's softball had not been part of the Olympic Games during 2012 or 2016. In the Olympics from 1996 to 2008, Japan won one gold medal, a silver medal and a bronze medal. In the top four nations at the Olympics, Japan is the second most successful national team (winning three medals), following the United States (four medals, three gold and a silver), and beating out Australia (also four medals out of which three were bronze and one silver) and China with one silver medal. After winning the gold medal at the 2008 Summer Olympics, the Japanese national team was defeated by the United States team at the XII Women's Softball World Cup in Caracas, Venezuela.

== Team ==
=== Roster ===
The roster was released on 23 March 2021.

Softball at the 2020 Summer Olympics – Japan roster
| Players | | Coaches |
| Pitchers: 16 Yamato Fujita; 17 Yukiko Ueno; 27 Miu Goto | Catchers: 1 Yukiyo Mine; 21 Nayu Kiyohara; 25 Haruka Agatsuma; Infielders: 4 Yuka Ichiguchi; 5 Yu Yamamoto; 10 Hitomi Kawabata; 12 Mana Atsumi; 14 Minori Naito; Outfielders: 2 Saki Yamazaki; 8 Nodoka Harada; 9 Sayaka Mori; 11 Eri Yamada | Manager: 0 Reika Utsugi; Coaches: Noriko Yamaji |

=== Schedule and results ===
On July 20, 2021, Japan won the initial game, which was against Australia; the result was 8:0. The game took place in Sabara, Fukushima.

== The future of the Japanese national softball team ==
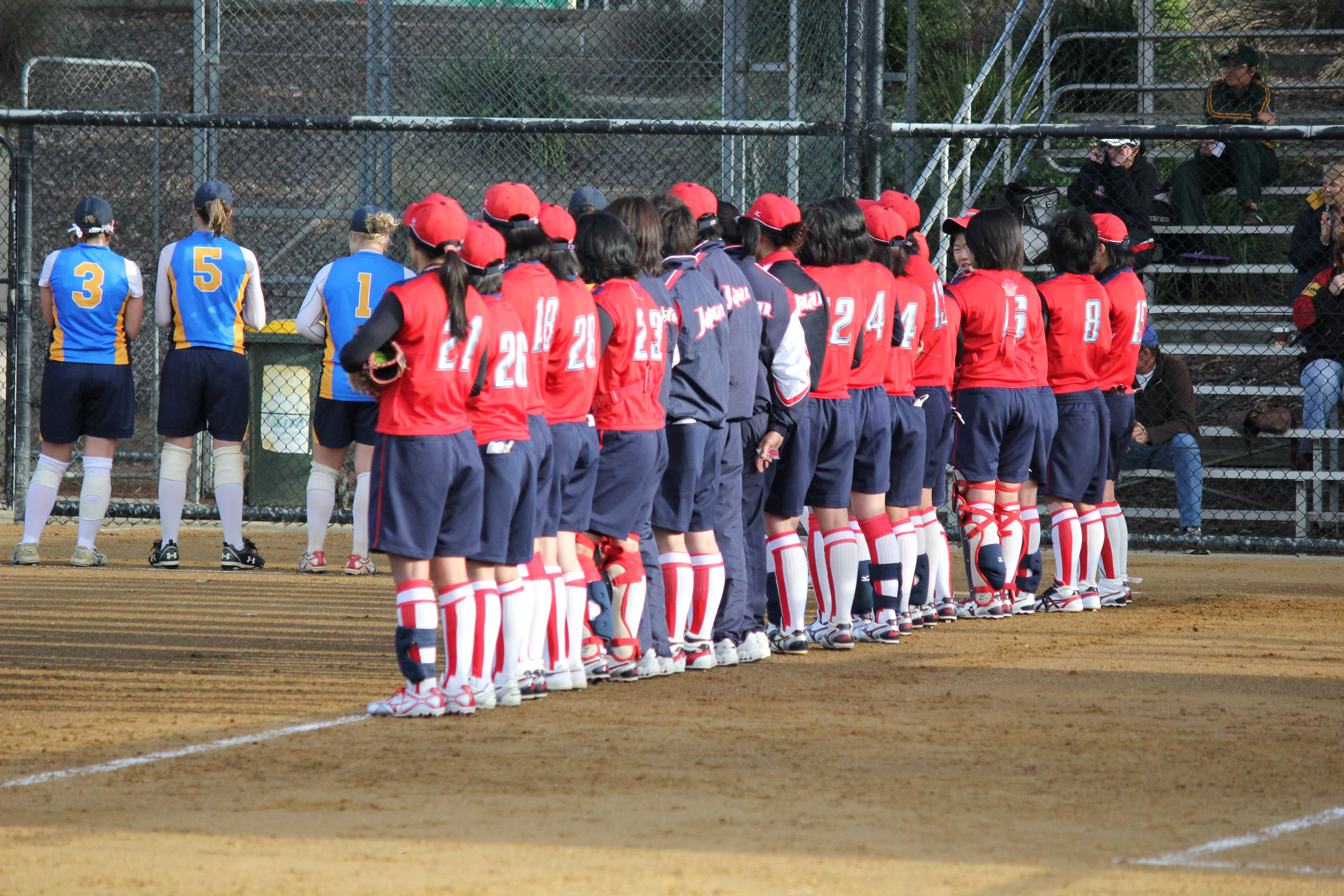
The Japanese side lined up during player introductions

The International Olympic Committee decided that softball and baseball should not be included in the 2016 Summer Olympics. Still, fast pitch softball tournaments are organized all over the World, and they provide the opportunity for the National teams to compete at the highest level players can attain. The Japan Softball Association holds the Japan Softball Cup, and other competitions include the World Cup of Softball and the International Softball Federation Women's World Championship.

== Additional information ==
- At the 2008 Summer Olympics, the Japanese prized pitcher, Yukiko Ueno, shut down the seemingly unstoppable American batters. Spectators labeled her the star of the series. With her challenging fast ball, the 26-year-old right hander threw 413 pitches in three full games over two days. In the game against the United States she threw strike after strike with speed and movement even though she had a huge blister on her pitching hand.
- At the 2008 Summer Olympics, the Japanese National Women's Softball Team had to pull out a 4–3 extra-inning win against Australia with Rei Nishiyama belting a home run in the 12th inning to reach the final. In the game prior to that, Japan lost 4–1 to the United States with the Americans scoring four runs in the ninth which allowed the Americans to reach the final.
- At the 2000 Summer Olympics in Sydney, the Japanese National Women's Softball Team won all their games until the gold medal match in which they lost to the United States 1–0 in extra inning and had to settle for the silver. The Japanese had beaten the United States in an earlier game, ending the American's 112-game winning streak.
- In the Athens Olympics in 2004, Yukiko Ueno entered the history books by pitching the first perfect game in Olympic history, leading Japan to a 2–0 win over China.
- Many softball players from abroad come to Japan to play for Japanese Corporate teams. Each team is allowed two foreigners, some even coming from the United States National Softball team.

== Honours ==
- Olympics: Gold Medal – 2008, 2020; Silver Medal – 2000; Bronze Medal – 2004
- Women's Softball World Cup: Gold Medal – 1970, 2012, 2014, 2024; Silver Medal – 2002, 2006, 2016, 2018; Bronze Medal – 1965, 1998
- Softball at the World Games: Gold Medal – 2009; Silver Medal – 2022; Bronze Medal – 2025
- 2006 Japan Softball Cup: 2nd
- World Cup of Softball: 1st – 2005; 2nd – 2007, 2006
