= Indonesia women's national softball team =

Indonesia women's national softball team is the national team for Indonesia. The team competed at the 1986 ISF Women's World Championship in Auckland, New Zealand where they finished eleventh. The team competed at the 1990 ISF Women's World Championship in Normal, Illinois where they finished with 1 win and 8 losses.

Softball at the 2018 Asian Games
