= Chinese Taipei women's national softball team =

Chinese Taipei

Information
- Country: Taiwan (Chinese Taipei)
- Federation: Chinese Taipei Softball Association
- Confederation: WBSC Asia
- WBSC World Rank: 4 (31 December 2024)

Olympic Games
- Appearances: 3 (First in 1996)
- Best result: 6th

Women's Softball World Cup
- Appearances: 16 (First in 1970)
- Best result: (silver) 2nd (1 time, in 1982)

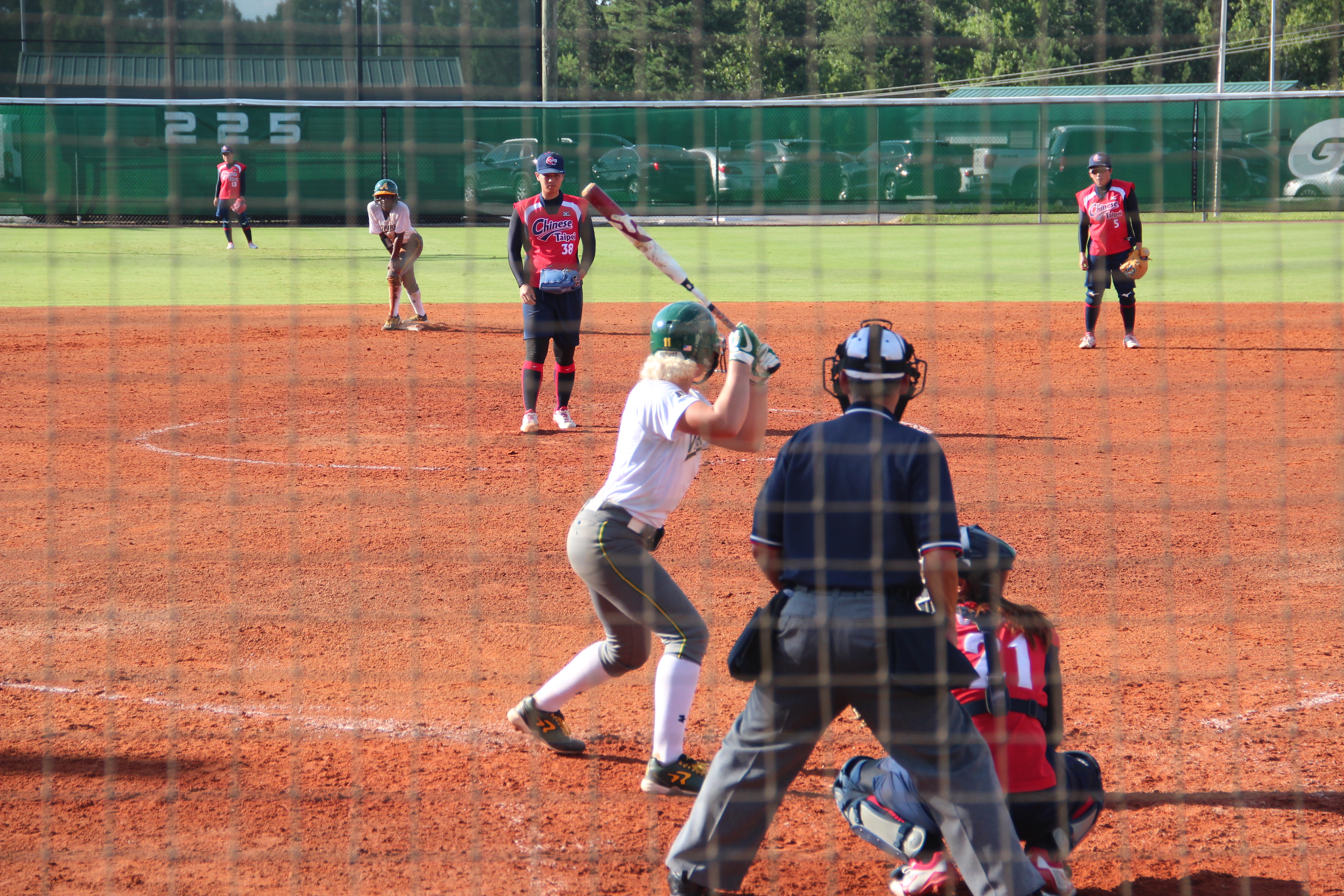
Chinese Taipei (red) at Georgia Gwinnett College, 2018

Chinese Taipei women's national softball team is the national team for Taiwan (Chinese Taipei).

== History ==
The team competed at the 1986 ISF Women's World Championship in Auckland, New Zealand where they finished sixth. The team competed at the 1990 ISF Women's World Championship in Normal, Illinois where they finished with 6 wins and 3 losses. The team competed at the 1994 ISF Women's World Championship in St. John's, Newfoundland where they finished fifth. The team competed at the 1998 ISF Women's World Championship in Fujinomiya City, Japan where they finished seventh. The team competed at the 2002 ISF Women's World Championship in Saskatoon, Saskatchewan where they finished third. The team competed at the 2006 ISF Women's World Championship in Beijing, China where they finished eighth. The team competed at the 2010 ISF Women's World Championship in Caracas, Venezuela where they finished seventh. The team competed at the 2022 World Games and won a bronze medal.
