= South Korea women's national softball team =

South Korea women's national softball team is the national team for South Korea. The team competed at the 1994 ISF Women's World Championship in St. John's, Newfoundland where they finished fifteenth. The team competed at the 1998 ISF Women's World Championship in Fujinomiya City, Japan where they finished fourteenth.
