= List of Olympic medalists in softball =

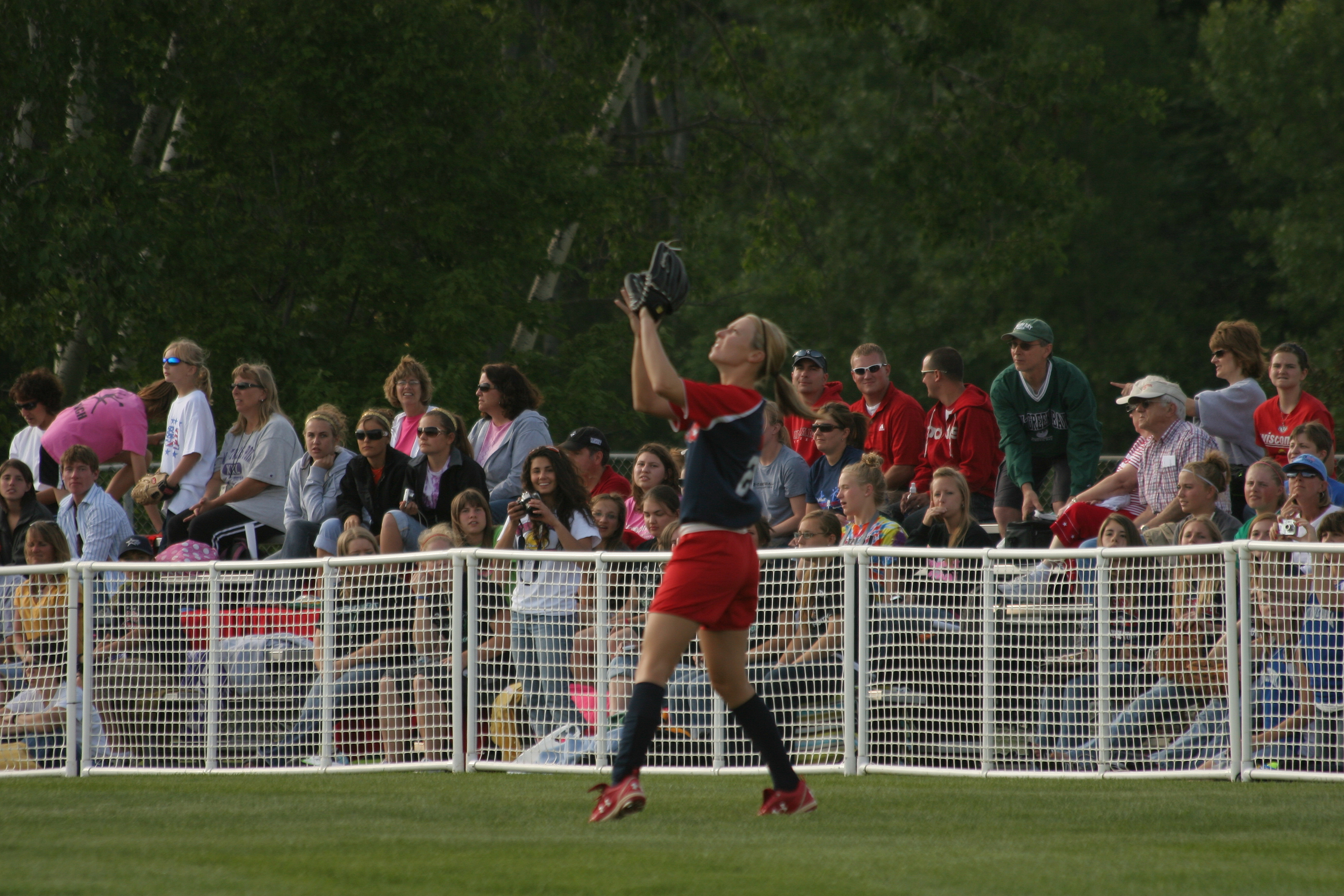
Laura Berg, with three gold and one silver medals, is the most successful Olympic athlete in softball.

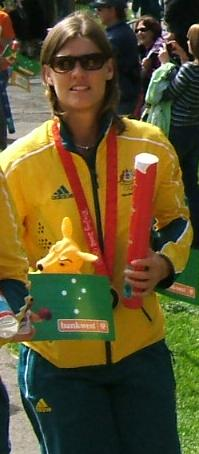
Australian player Natalie Ward won bronze in 1996, 2000, and 2008 and silver in 2004, one of four players to medal in four tournaments.

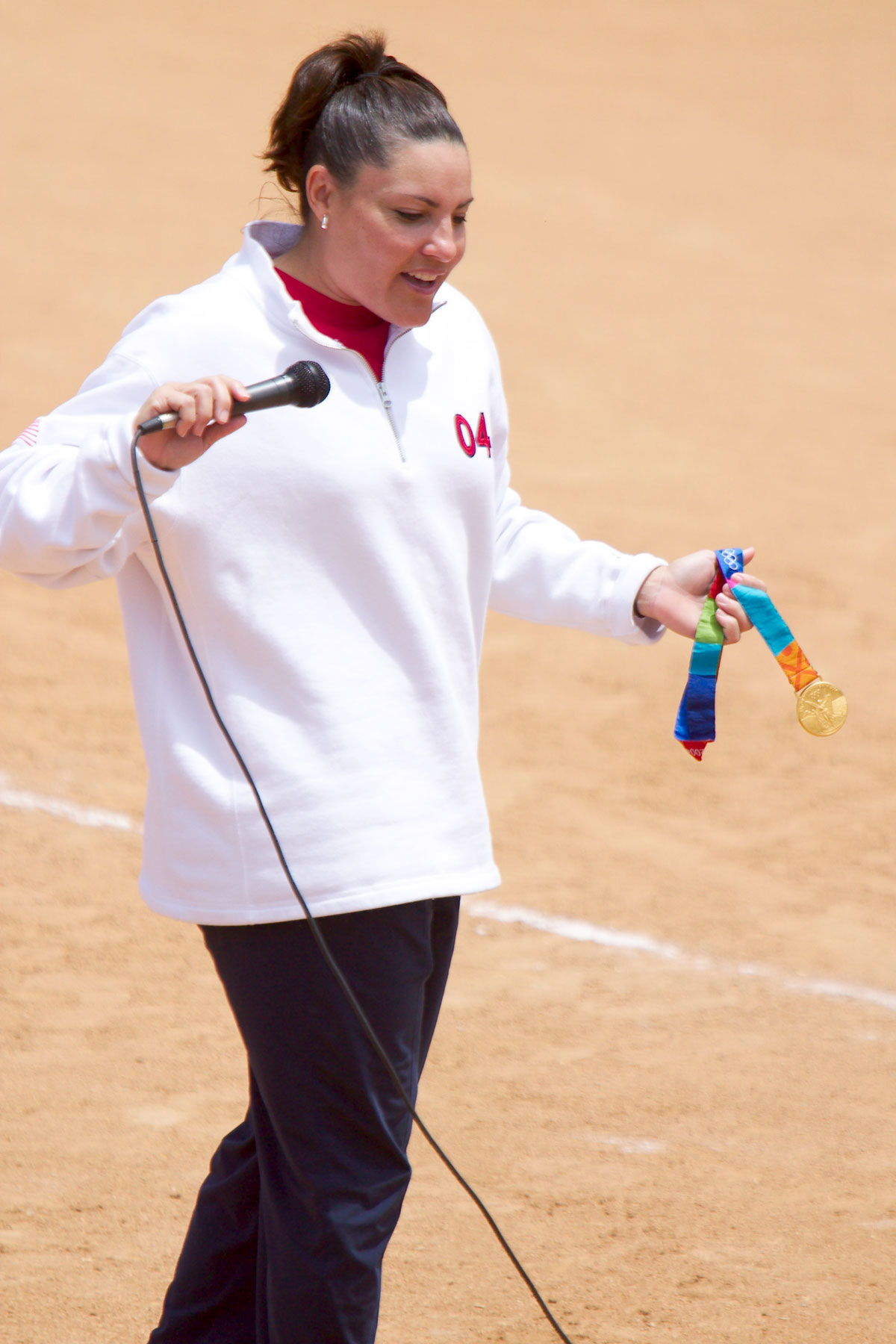
United States athlete Lisa Fernandez won gold medals in the first three Olympic softball tournaments.

Softball is a sport that was formerly contested at the Summer Olympic Games. On December 8, 1989, the International Olympic Committee (IOC) declined to stage a softball tournament as a demonstration sport in the 1992 Summer Olympics. At the 97th IOC session in 1991, the sport was granted official status as a medal sport for the 1996 Atlanta Olympics. Softball was contested at each subsequent Games through 2008, after which the IOC removed it from the Olympic program.

Entering the first Olympic softball tournament in 1996, the United States were the favorites, having won every international competition in which they participated for the prior ten years. The United States team lived up to expectations by winning the gold medal. The Americans lost one game in the tournament, outscoring their opponents by a combined 41 runs to 8. The Chinese team won their only Olympic medal in softball, a silver, in 1996. In the 2000 tournament, the United States won their second consecutive gold medal, although they lost three games in the preliminary round at the Sydney Games. At the 2004 Summer Olympics, the United States earned their third consecutive gold medal, winning all nine games and only allowing one run the entire tournament.

In 2004, the IOC investigated the addition of sports to the Olympic schedule including golf, rugby sevens, squash, roller sports, and karate. The IOC voted on July 8, 2005, to remove softball and baseball from the 2012 Summer Olympics roster, the first sports removed from the Olympics since polo in 1936. Appeals to reinstate both sports for 2012 were rejected. Softball was still played at the 2008 Summer Olympics in Beijing, however, and the Japanese team claimed their first gold and third overall medal in Olympic softball. The United States won silver, and the Australian team bronze, to become the only countries to win a medal in all four Olympic softball tournaments. The international governing bodies of softball, baseball, rugby sevens, golf, karate, roller sports, and squash petitioned the IOC in 2009 to fill two sport slots at the 2016 Olympics. IOC President Jacques Rogge said they were "looking for an added value – wide appeal, especially for young people". Ultimately the IOC voted to fill the two available slots for 2016 with rugby and golf. Softball and baseball were reinstated together on a one-time basis at the 2020 Summer Olympics in Tokyo.

Five nations have won medals in softball at the Olympics; the United States, China, Australia, Japan, and Canada. With three gold medals and two silver, the United States were the most successful team. American center fielder Laura Berg was a part of four of those five teams. Three Australian players also won four medals: one silver and three bronze. Ten athletes won three medals, while thirty more won two medals.

== Medal winners ==
Games	Gold	Silver	Bronze
1996 Atlanta	United States; Laura Berg; Gillian Boxx; Sheila Cornell; Lisa Fernandez; Michele Granger; Lori Harrigan; Dionna Harris; Kim Maher; Leah O'Brien; Dot Richardson; Julie Smith; Michele Smith; Shelly Stokes; Danielle Tyler; Christa Lee Williams	China; An Zhongxin; Chen Hong; He Liping; Lei Li; Liu Xuqing; Liu Yaju; Ma Ying; Ou Jingbai; Tao Hua; Wang Lihong; Wang Ying; Wei Qiang; Xu Jian; Yan Fang; Zhang Chunfang	Australia; Joanne Brown; Kim Cooper; Carolyn Crudgington; Kerry Dienelt; Peta Edebone; Tanya Harding; Jennifer Holliday; Joyce Lester; Sally McDermid; Francine McRae; Haylea Petrie; Nicole Richardson; Melanie Roche; Natalie Ward; Brooke Wilkins
2000 Sydney	United States; Christie Ambrosi; Laura Berg; Jennifer Brundage; Crystl Bustos; Sheila Cornell; Lisa Fernandez; Lori Harrigan; Danielle Henderson; Jennifer McFalls; Stacey Nuveman; Leah O'Brien; Dot Richardson; Michele Smith; Michelle Venturella; Christa Lee Williams	Japan; Misako Ando; Yumiko Fujii; Taeko Ishikawa; Kazue Ito; Yoshimi Kobayashi; Shiori Koseki; Mariko Masubuchi; Naomi Matsumoto; Emi Naito; Haruka Saito; Juri Takayama; Hiroko Tamoto; Reika Utsugi; Miyo Yamada; Noriko Yamaji	Australia; Sandra Allen; Joanne Brown; Kerry Dienelt; Peta Edebone; Sue Fairhurst; Selina Follas; Fiona Hanes; Kelly Hardie; Tanya Harding; Sally McDermid; Simmone Morrow; Melanie Roche; Natalie Titcume; Natalie Ward; Brooke Wilkins
2004 Athens	United States; Leah Amico; Laura Berg; Crystl Bustos; Lisa Fernandez; Jennie Finch; Tairia Flowers; Amanda Freed; Lori Harrigan; Lovieanne Jung; Kelly Kretschman; Jessica Mendoza; Stacey Nuveman; Cat Osterman; Jenny Topping; Natasha Watley	Australia; Sandra Allen; Marissa Carpadios; Fiona Crawford; Amanda Doman; Peta Edebone; Tanya Harding; Natalie Hodgskin; Simmone Morrow; Tracey Mosley; Stacey Porter; Melanie Roche; Natalie Titcume; Natalie Ward; Brooke Wilkins; Kerry Wyborn	Japan; Emi Inui; Kazue Ito; Yumi Iwabuchi; Masumi Mishina; Emi Naito; Haruka Saito; Hiroko Sakai; Naoko Sakamoto; Rie Sato; Yuki Sato; Juri Takayama; Yukiko Ueno; Reika Utsugi; Eri Yamada; Noriko Yamaji
2008 Beijing	Japan; Naho Emoto; Motoko Fujimoto; Megu Hirose; Emi Inui; Sachiko Ito; Ayumi Karino; Satoko Mabuchi; Yukiyo Mine; Masumi Mishina; Rei Nishiyama; Hiroko Sakai; Rie Sato; Mika Someya; Yukiko Ueno; Eri Yamada	United States; Monica Abbott; Laura Berg; Crystl Bustos; Andrea Duran; Jennie Finch; Tairia Flowers; Victoria Galindo; Lovieanne Jung; Kelly Kretschman; Lauren Lappin; Caitlin Lowe; Jessica Mendoza; Stacey Nuveman; Cat Osterman; Natasha Watley	Australia; Jodie Bowering; Kylie Cronk; Kelly Hardie; Tanya Harding; Sandy Lewis; Simmone Morrow; Tracey Mosley; Stacey Porter; Melanie Roche; Justine Smethurst; Danielle Stewart; Natalie Titcume; Natalie Ward; Belinda Wright; Kerry Wyborn
2012 and 2016	not included in the Olympic program		
2020 Tokyo	Japan; Haruka Agatsuma; Mana Atsumi; Yamato Fujita; Nozomi Goto; Nodoka Harada; Yuka Ichiguchi; Hitomi Kawabata; Nayu Kiyohara; Yukiyo Mine; Sayaka Mori; Minori Naito; Yukiko Ueno; Reika Utsugi; Eri Yamada; Yu Yamamoto	United States; Ali Aguilar; Monica Abbott; Valerie Arioto; Ally Carda; Amanda Chidester; Rachel Garcia; Haylie McCleney; Michelle Moultrie; Dejah Mulipola; Aubree Munro; Bubba Nickles; Cat Osterman; Jeanie Reed; Delaney Spaulding; Kelsey Stewart	Canada; Jenna Caira; Emma Entzminger; Larissa Franklin; Jennifer Gilbert; Sara Groenewegen; Kelsey Harshman; Victoria Hayward; Danielle Lawrie; Janet Leung; Joey Lye; Erika Polidori; Kaleigh Rafter; Lauren Regula; Jennifer Salling; Natalie Wideman
2024	Not included in the Olympic program		
2028 Los Angeles			

== Athlete medal leaders ==
Athletes who won at least two gold medals or three total medals are listed below.

Athlete	Nation	Olympics	Total	Gold	Silver	Bronze
Laura Berg	United States	1996–2008	4	3	1	0
Melanie Roche	Australia	1996–2008	4	0	1	3
Natalie Ward	Australia	1996–2008	4	0	1	3
Tanya Harding	Australia	1996–2008	4	0	1	3
Leah O'Brien	United States	1996–2004	3	3	0	0
Lisa Fernandez	United States	1996–2004	3	3	0	0
Lori Harrigan	United States	1996–2004	3	3	0	0
Crystl Bustos	United States	2000–2008	3	2	1	0
Stacey Nuveman	United States	2000–2008	3	2	1	0
Yukiko Ueno	Japan	2004–2020	3	2	0	1
Eri Yamada	Japan	2004–2020	3	2	0	1
Cat Osterman	United States	2004–2020	3	1	2	0
Sandra Allen	Australia	2000–2008	3	0	1	2
Brooke Wilkins	Australia	1996–2004	3	0	1	2
Natalie Titcume	Australia	2000–2008	3	0	1	2
Simmone Morrow	Australia	2000–2008	3	0	1	2
Peta Edebone	Australia	1996–2004	3	0	1	2
Christa Lee Williams	United States	1996–2000	2	2	0	0
Sheila Cornell	United States	1996–2000	2	2	0	0
Michele Smith	United States	1996–2000	2	2	0	0
Dot Richardson	United States	1996–2000	2	2	0	0
Yukiyo Mine	Japan	2008–2020	2	2	0	0

== See also ==
- Softball at the Summer Olympics
- Women's Softball World Cup
- Softball at the World Games
