= Softball at the 2008 Summer Olympics =

Softball at the Games of the XXIX Olympiad
- Pictogram used to identify softball at the 2008 Games
- Venue: Fengtai Softball Field
- Dates: August 12–21, 2008
- Teams: 8

Medalists
| 1st place, gold medalist(s) | | Japan |
| 2nd place, silver medalist(s) | | United States |
| 3rd place, bronze medalist(s) | | Australia |

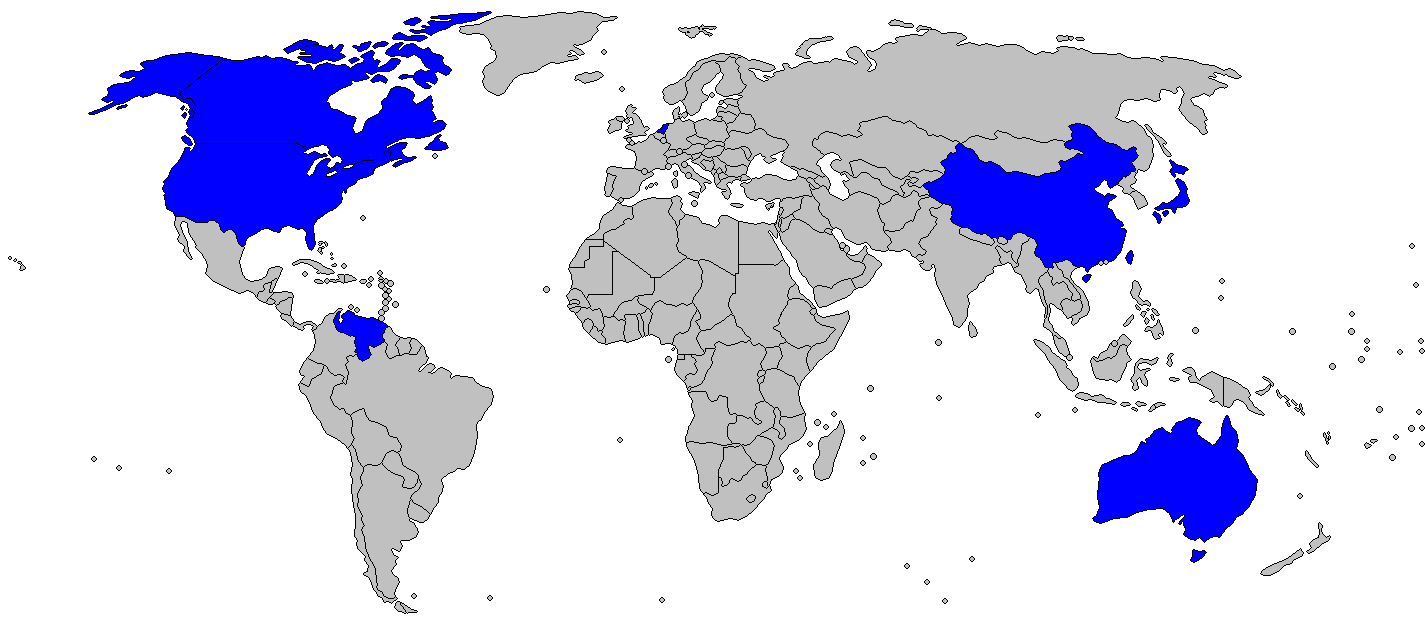
Competing teams

Softball at the 2008 Summer Olympics in Beijing took place over a ten-day period starting August 12 and culminating in the medal finals on August 21. All games were played at the Fengtai Softball Field. Olympic softball is a women only competition, with men competing in the similar sport of baseball.

This is the last time Softball was contested as a core sport at the Olympics, as the International Olympic Committee voted to remove baseball from the program in the 2012 Olympics. Along with baseball, softball was rejected for inclusion in the 2016 Summer Olympics at the IOC's meeting in October 2009. However, softball was contested at the 2020 Games and will be included at the 2028 games as an additional sport.

== Medalists ==
| Gold | Silver | Bronze |
|---|---|---|
| Japan Naho Emoto; Motoko Fujimoto; Megu Hirose; Emi Inui; Sachiko Ito; Ayumi Karino; Satoko Mabuchi; Yukiyo Mine; Masumi Mishina; Rei Nishiyama; Hiroko Sakai; Rie Sato; Mika Someya; Yukiko Ueno; Eri Yamada | United States Monica Abbott; Stacey Nuveman; Crystl Bustos; Jennie Finch; Laura Berg; Lauren Lappin; Lovieanne Jung; Cat Osterman; Tairia Flowers; Andrea Duran; Jessica Mendoza; Victoria Galindo; Kelly Kretschman; Caitlin Lowe; Natasha Watley | Australia Jodie Bowering; Kylie Cronk; Kelly Hardie; Tanya Harding; Sandy Lewis; Simmone Morrow; Tracey Mosley; Stacey Porter; Melanie Roche; Justine Smethurst; Danielle Stewart; Natalie Titcume; Natalie Ward; Belinda Wright; Kerry Wyborn |

== Participants ==
- Australia
- Canada
- China
- Chinese Taipei
- Japan
- Netherlands
- United States
- Venezuela

== Competition format ==
Eight teams compete in the Olympic softball tournament, and the competition consists of two rounds. The preliminary round follows a round robin format, where each of the teams plays all the other teams once. Following this, the top four teams advance to a page playoff system round consisting of two semifinal games, and finally the bronze and gold medal games.

== Qualification ==
The eight teams in the Olympic softball tournament qualify through a series of tournaments. China, as the host nation, was guaranteed one automatic entry. The top four finalists at the 2006 Softball World Championships qualify for the Olympic tournament. Finally, there were continental qualifying tournaments for Europe/Africa, Pan-America, and Asia/Oceania, with the winners of each tournament earning a spot in the Olympic tournament.

== Qualification schedule ==
| Date | Event | Location | Qualifier |
|---|---|---|---|
| | Host Nation | | China |
| Aug. 20–29, 2006 | 2006 ISF World Championship | (China) Beijing | United States; Japan; Australia; Canada |
| June 9–16, 2007 | Europe & Africa Olympic Qualifying Tournament | (Italy) Trieste | Netherlands |
| Feb. 1–5, 2007 | Asian & Oceania Olympic Qualifying Tournament | (Chinese Taipei) Tainan City | Chinese Taipei^{1} |
| Aug. 19–24, 2007 | Pan-American Olympic Qualifying Tournament | (Venezuela) Valencia | Venezuela |

^Note 1: Chinese Taipei is the official IOC designation for the state officially referred to as the Republic of China, more commonly known as Taiwan. (See also political status of Taiwan for details.)

== Group stage ==
=== Preliminary round ===
| Qualified for the semifinals |
| Eliminated |

The top four teams advance to the semifinal round.

All times are China Standard Time (UTC+8)

| Team | W | L | RS | RA | WIN% | GB | Tiebreaker |
|---|---|---|---|---|---|---|---|
| United States | 7 | 0 | 53 | 1 | 1.000 | - | - |
| Japan | 6 | 1 | 23 | 13 | .857 | 1 | - |
| Australia | 5 | 2 | 30 | 11 | .714 | 2 | - |
| Canada | 3 | 4 | 17 | 23 | .429 | 4 | - |
| Chinese Taipei | 2 | 5 | 10 | 23 | .286 | 5 | 2-0 vs. CHN/VEN |
| China | 2 | 5 | 19 | 21 | .286 | 5 | 1-1 vs. TPE/VEN |
| Venezuela | 2 | 5 | 15 | 35 | .286 | 5 | 0-2 vs. CHN/TPE |
| Netherlands | 1 | 6 | 8 | 48 | .143 | 6 | - |

Tiebreaking procedures follow the International Softball Federation's standard procedure for the resolution of ties.

August 12

| Team | 1 | 2 | 3 | 4 | 5 | 6 | 7 | R | H | E |
|---|---|---|---|---|---|---|---|---|---|---|
| Chinese Taipei | 0 | 0 | 0 | 0 | 0 | 0 | 1 | 1 | 2 | 2 |
| Canada | 0 | 2 | 2 | 0 | 0 | 2 | 0 | 6 | 11 | 0 |
WP: Lauren Bay(1-0) LP: Chia-Yen Wu(0-1); Home runs: TPE: Chia-Ching Ll(1); CAN: None

| Team | 1 | 2 | 3 | 4 | 5 | 6 | 7 | R | H | E |
|---|---|---|---|---|---|---|---|---|---|---|
| United States | 0 | 4 | 2 | 5 | 0 | X | X | 11 | 11 | 0 |
| Venezuela | 0 | 0 | 0 | 0 | 0 | X | X | 0 | 0 | 2 |
WP: Jennie Finch(1-0) LP: Johana Gómez(0-1); Home runs: USA: Natasha Watley(1), Caitlin Lowe(1), Crystl Bustos(1); VEN: None

| Team | 1 | 2 | 3 | 4 | 5 | 6 | 7 | R | H | E |
|---|---|---|---|---|---|---|---|---|---|---|
| China | 0 | 0 | 0 | 0 | 5 | 1 | 4 | 10 | 13 | 1 |
| Netherlands | 0 | 0 | 0 | 0 | 2 | 0 | 0 | 2 | 5 | 3 |
WP: Huili Yu(1-0) LP: Kristi de Varies(0-1); Home runs: CHN: Lifang Zhang(1), Zhou Yi(1); NED: Marloes Fellinger(1)

| Team | 1 | 2 | 3 | 4 | 5 | 6 | 7 | R | H | E |
|---|---|---|---|---|---|---|---|---|---|---|
| Australia | 0 | 3 | 0 | 0 | 0 | 0 | 0 | 3 | 6 | 1 |
| Japan | 3 | 1 | 0 | 0 | 0 | 0 | X | 4 | 5 | 1 |
WP: Yukiko Ueno(1-0) LP: Melanie Roche(0-1); Home runs: AUS: Jodie Bowering(1), Natalie Titcume(1); JPN: Satoko Mabuchi(1)

August 13

| Team | 1 | 2 | 3 | 4 | 5 | 6 | 7 | R | H | E |
|---|---|---|---|---|---|---|---|---|---|---|
| China | 1 | 0 | 1 | 0 | 3 | 1 | 1 | 7 | 10 | 1 |
| Venezuela | 0 | 0 | 0 | 1 | 0 | 0 | 0 | 1 | 6 | 0 |
WP: Wei Lu(1-0) LP: Mariangee Bogado(0-1); Home runs: CHN: Yanhong Yu(1); VEN: None

| Team | 1 | 2 | 3 | 4 | 5 | 6 | 7 | R | H | E |
|---|---|---|---|---|---|---|---|---|---|---|
| United States | 0 | 0 | 0 | 0 | 1 | 2 | X | 3 | 5 | 0 |
| Australia | 0 | 0 | 0 | 0 | 0 | 0 | 0 | 0 | 0 | 1 |
WP: Cat Osterman(1-0) LP: Tanya Harding(0-1); Home runs: USA: Crystl Bustos(2); AUS: None

| Team | 1 | 2 | 3 | 4 | 5 | 6 | 7 | R | H | E |
|---|---|---|---|---|---|---|---|---|---|---|
| Japan | 0 | 0 | 0 | 1 | 1 | 0 | 0 | 2 | 9 | 1 |
| Chinese Taipei | 0 | 0 | 0 | 0 | 0 | 0 | 1 | 1 | 6 | 1 |
WP: Hiroko Sakai(1-0) LP: Sheng-Jung Lai(0-1); Home runs: JPN: Satoko Mabuchi(2); TPE: None

| Team | 1 | 2 | 3 | 4 | 5 | 6 | 7 | R | H | E |
|---|---|---|---|---|---|---|---|---|---|---|
| Canada | 0 | 0 | 3 | 4 | 1 | 1 | X | 9 | 11 | 1 |
| Netherlands | 0 | 0 | 0 | 1 | 1 | 0 | X | 2 | 3 | 1 |
WP: Danielle Lawrie(1-0) LP: Kristi de Varies(0-2); Home runs: CAN: Kaleigh Rafter(1), Melanie Matthews(1); NED: Sandra Gouverneur(1)

August 14

| Team | 1 | 2 | 3 | 4 | 5 | 6 | 7 | R | H | E |
|---|---|---|---|---|---|---|---|---|---|---|
| China | 0 | 0 | 1 | 0 | 0 | 0 | 0 | 1 | 3 | 0 |
| Australia | 1 | 2 | 0 | 0 | 0 | 0 | 0 | 3 | 4 | 2 |
WP: Tanya Harding(1-1) LP: Huili Yu(1-1); Home runs: CHN: None; AUS: Simmone Morrow(1,2)

| Team | 1 | 2 | 3 | 4 | 5 | 6 | 7 | R | H | E |
|---|---|---|---|---|---|---|---|---|---|---|
| Canada | 1 | 0 | 0 | 0 | 0 | 0 | 0 | 1 | 1 | 3 |
| United States | 0 | 0 | 0 | 0 | 0 | 4 | 4 | 8 | 6 | 1 |
WP: Cat Osterman(2-0) LP: Dione Meier(0-1)

| Team | 1 | 2 | 3 | 4 | 5 | 6 | 7 | R | H | E |
|---|---|---|---|---|---|---|---|---|---|---|
| Netherlands | 0 | 0 | 0 | 0 | 0 | 0 | 0 | 0 | 4 | 1 |
| Japan | 2 | 0 | 0 | 0 | 1 | 0 | X | 3 | 8 | 0 |
WP: Hiroko Sakai(2-0) LP: Judith van Kampen(0-1) Sv: Naho Emoto(1)

| Team | 1 | 2 | 3 | 4 | 5 | 6 | 7 | R | H | E |
|---|---|---|---|---|---|---|---|---|---|---|
| Chinese Taipei | 2 | 0 | 0 | 1 | 0 | 0 | X | 3 | 6 | 0 |
| Venezuela | 0 | 0 | 0 | 0 | 0 | 0 | 0 | 0 | 3 | 2 |
WP: Chia-Yen Wu(1-1) LP: Johana Gómez(0-2); Home runs: TPE: Hsueh-Mei Lu(1); VEN: None

August 15

| Team | 1 | 2 | 3 | 4 | 5 | 6 | 7 | R | H | E |
|---|---|---|---|---|---|---|---|---|---|---|
| China | 0 | 0 | 0 | 0 | 0 | 0 | 0 | 0 | 2 | 0 |
| Canada | 0 | 0 | 0 | 0 | 0 | 1 | 0 | 1 | 3 | 2 |
WP: Lauren Bay(2-0) LP: Wei Lu(1-1); Home runs: CHN: None; CAN: Jennifer Yee(1)

| Team | 1 | 2 | 3 | 4 | 5 | 6 | 7 | R | H | E |
|---|---|---|---|---|---|---|---|---|---|---|
| United States | 4 | 0 | 0 | 3 | 0 | X | X | 7 | 9 | 0 |
| Japan | 0 | 0 | 0 | 0 | 0 | X | X | 0 | 1 | 1 |
WP: Monica Abbott(1-0) LP: Naho Emoto(0-1); Home runs: USA: Natasha Watley(2), Jessica Mendoza(1,2), Crystl Bustos(3); JPN: None

| Team | 1 | 2 | 3 | 4 | 5 | 6 | 7 | R | H | E |
|---|---|---|---|---|---|---|---|---|---|---|
| Australia | 0 | 0 | 0 | 0 | 2 | 1 | 0 | 3 | 5 | 0 |
| Chinese Taipei | 1 | 0 | 0 | 0 | 0 | 0 | 0 | 1 | 5 | 0 |
WP: Kelly Hardie(1-0) LP: Sheng-Jung Lai(0-2); Home runs: AUS: Natalie Ward(1), Natalie Titcume(2); TPE: None

| Team | 1 | 2 | 3 | 4 | 5 | 6 | 7 | R | H | E |
|---|---|---|---|---|---|---|---|---|---|---|
| Venezuela | 3 | 3 | 0 | 2 | X | X | X | 8 | 7 | 0 |
| Netherlands | 0 | 0 | 0 | 0 | 0 | X | X | 0 | 1 | 0 |
WP: Mariangee Bogado(1-1) LP: Kristi de Varies(0-3)

August 16

| Team | 1 | 2 | 3 | 4 | 5 | 6 | 7 | R | H | E |
|---|---|---|---|---|---|---|---|---|---|---|
| Japan | 0 | 0 | 3 | 0 | 0 | 0 | 0 | 3 | 2 | 0 |
| China | 0 | 0 | 0 | 0 | 0 | 0 | 0 | 0 | 6 | 2 |
WP: Yukiko Ueno(2-0) LP: Wei Lu(1-2) Sv: Hiroko Sakai(1); Home runs: JPN: Rie Sato(1); CHN: None

| Team | 1 | 2 | 3 | 4 | 5 | 6 | 7 | R | H | E |
|---|---|---|---|---|---|---|---|---|---|---|
| United States | 1 | 0 | 5 | 1 | X | X | X | 7 | 10 | 0 |
| Chinese Taipei | 0 | 0 | 0 | 0 | 0 | X | X | 0 | 2 | 1 |
WP: Jennie Finch(2-0) LP: Su-Hua Lin(0-1); Home runs: USA: Jessica Mendoza(3); TPE: None

| Team | 1 | 2 | 3 | 4 | 5 | 6 | 7 | R | H | E |
|---|---|---|---|---|---|---|---|---|---|---|
| Netherlands | 0 | 0 | 0 | 0 | 0 | 0 | 0 | 0 | 1 | 2 |
| Australia | 0 | 2 | 0 | 2 | 0 | 0 | 4 | 8 | 7 | 0 |
WP: Justine Smethurst(1-0) LP: Kristi de Varies(0-4); Home runs: NED: None; AUS: Simmone Morrow(3), Sandy Lewis(1)

| Team | 1 | 2 | 3 | 4 | 5 | 6 | 7 | R | H | E |
|---|---|---|---|---|---|---|---|---|---|---|
| Venezuela | 1 | 0 | 0 | 1 | 0 | 0 | 0 | 2 | 4 | 0 |
| Canada | 0 | 0 | 0 | 0 | 0 | 0 | 0 | 0 | 5 | 0 |
WP: Mariangee Bogado(2-1) LP: Danielle Lawrie(1-1); Home runs: VEN: Yuruby Alicart(1); CAN: None

August 17

| Team | 1 | 2 | 3 | 4 | 5 | 6 | 7 | R | H | E |
|---|---|---|---|---|---|---|---|---|---|---|
| Chinese Taipei | 1 | 0 | 0 | 1 | 0 | 0 | 0 | 2 | 6 | 1 |
| China | 0 | 1 | 0 | 0 | 0 | 0 | 0 | 1 | 5 | 1 |
WP: Ming-Hui Chueh(1-0) LP: Huili Yu(1-2)

| Team | 1 | 2 | 3 | 4 | 5 | 6 | 7 | R | H | E |
|---|---|---|---|---|---|---|---|---|---|---|
| Venezuela | 0 | 0 | 1 | 1 | 0 | 0 | 0 | 2 | 7 | 0 |
| Japan | 0 | 0 | 0 | 1 | 4 | 0 | X | 5 | 9 | 0 |
WP: Hiroko Sakai(3-0) LP: Mariangee Bogado(2-2); Home runs: VEN: None; JPN: Satoko Mabuchi(3), Eri Yamada (1)

| Team | 1 | 2 | 3 | 4 | 5 | 6 | 7 | R | H | E |
|---|---|---|---|---|---|---|---|---|---|---|
| Australia | 0 | 0 | 0 | 0 | 0 | 1 | 3 | 4 | 4 | 0 |
| Canada | 0 | 0 | 0 | 0 | 0 | 0 | 0 | 0 | 3 | 0 |
WP: Tanya Harding(2-1) LP: Lauren Bay(2-1)

| Team | 1 | 2 | 3 | 4 | 5 | 6 | 7 | R | H | E |
|---|---|---|---|---|---|---|---|---|---|---|
| United States | 1 | 2 | 3 | 2 | X | X | X | 8 | 13 | 0 |
| Netherlands | 0 | 0 | 0 | 0 | 0 | X | X | 0 | 0 | 1 |
WP: Monica Abbott(2-0) LP: Rebecca Soumeru(0-1); Home runs: USA: Tairia Flowers(1), Crystl Bustos(4), Jessica Mendoza(4); NED: None

August 18

| Team | 1 | 2 | 3 | 4 | 5 | 6 | 7 | R | H | E |
|---|---|---|---|---|---|---|---|---|---|---|
| Netherlands | 0 | 2 | 2 | 0 | 0 | 0 | X | 4 | 6 | 3 |
| Chinese Taipei | 1 | 0 | 0 | 0 | 0 | 0 | 1 | 2 | 7 | 1 |
WP: Rebecca Soumeru(1-1) LP: Ming-Hui Chueh(1-1) Sv: Rebecca Soumeru(1)

| Team | 1 | 2 | 3 | 4 | 5 | 6 | 7 | R | H | E |
|---|---|---|---|---|---|---|---|---|---|---|
| China | 0 | 0 | 0 | 0 | 0 | X | X | 0 | 1 | 1 |
| United States | 9 | 0 | 0 | 0 | X | X | X | 9 | 9 | 0 |
WP: Cat Osterman(3-0) LP: Wei Lu(1-3); Home runs: CHN: None; USA: Kelly Kretschman(1)

| Team | 1 | 2 | 3 | 4 | 5 | 6 | 7 | R | H | E |
|---|---|---|---|---|---|---|---|---|---|---|
| Canada | 0 | 0 | 0 | 0 | 0 | 0 | 0 | 0 | 4 | 3 |
| Japan | 0 | 2 | 2 | 0 | 0 | 2 | 0 | 6 | 9 | 0 |
WP: Yukiko Ueno(3-0) LP: Lauren Bay(2-2) Sv: Mika Someya(1)

| Team | 1 | 2 | 3 | 4 | 5 | 6 | 7 | R | H | E |
|---|---|---|---|---|---|---|---|---|---|---|
| Venezuela | 0 | 0 | 0 | 0 | 2 | X | X | 2 | 1 | 0 |
| Australia | 4 | 1 | 0 | 4 | 0 | X | X | 9 | 8 | 0 |
WP: Justine Smethurst(2-0) LP: Mariangee Bogado(2-3); Home runs: VEN: None; AUS: Danielle Stewart(1)

== Medal round ==
The loser of 1&2 seed game will play the winner of the 3&4 seed game in the bronze medal match. The loser of the bronze medal match wins the bronze medal while the winner goes on to play the winner of the 1&2 seed game for the gold medal in the gold medal match.

Semifinals
1 | United States | 4
2 | Japan | 1
3 | Australia | 5
4 | Canada | 3

Bronze medal game
3 | Australia | 3
2 | Japan | 4

Gold medal game
1 | United States | 1
2 | Japan | 3

=== Semi finals ===
| Team | 1 | 2 | 3 | 4 | 5 | 6 | 7 | 8 | 9 | R | H | E |
|---|---|---|---|---|---|---|---|---|---|---|---|---|
| United States | 0 | 0 | 0 | 0 | 0 | 0 | 0 | 0 | 4 | 4 | 6 | 0 |
| Japan | 0 | 0 | 0 | 0 | 0 | 0 | 0 | 0 | 1 | 1 | 3 | 0 |
WP: Monica Abbott(3-0) LP: Yukiko Ueno(3-1) Sv: Cat Osterman; Home runs: USA: Crystl Bustos(5); JPN: None

| Team | 1 | 2 | 3 | 4 | 5 | 6 | 7 | R | H | E |
|---|---|---|---|---|---|---|---|---|---|---|
| Australia | 0 | 1 | 1 | 1 | 0 | 2 | 0 | 5 | 4 | 2 |
| Canada | 0 | 0 | 3 | 0 | 0 | 0 | 0 | 3 | 5 | 2 |
WP: Tanya Harding(3-1) LP: Lauren Bay(2-3); Home runs: AUS: Sandy Lewis(1), Danielle Stewart(2); CAN: None

=== Bronze medal match ===
Winner advances to gold medal match. Loser wins bronze medal.

| Team | 1 | 2 | 3 | 4 | 5 | 6 | 7 | 8 | 9 | 10 | 11 | 12 | R | H | E |
|---|---|---|---|---|---|---|---|---|---|---|---|---|---|---|---|
| Australia | 1 | 0 | 0 | 0 | 0 | 0 | 1 | 0 | 0 | 0 | 1 | 0 | 3 | 7 | 2 |
| Japan | 0 | 0 | 0 | 2 | 0 | 0 | 0 | 0 | 0 | 0 | 1 | 1 | 4 | 11 | 1 |
WP: Yukiko Ueno(4-1) LP: Tanya Harding(3-2); Home runs: AUS: Kerry Wyborn, JPN: Megu Hirose

=== Gold medal match ===
| Team | 1 | 2 | 3 | 4 | 5 | 6 | 7 | R | H | E |
|---|---|---|---|---|---|---|---|---|---|---|
| Japan | 0 | 0 | 1 | 1 | 0 | 0 | 1 | 3 | 4 | 0 |
| United States | 0 | 0 | 0 | 1 | 0 | 0 | 0 | 1 | 5 | 2 |
WP: Yukiko Ueno(5-1) LP: Cat Osterman(3-1); Home runs: JPN: Eri Yamada (2); USA: Crystl Bustos (6)
