= Iwabuchi =

Iwabuchi (written: 岩渕 or 岩淵) is a Japanese surname. Notable people with the surname include:

- Isao Iwabuchi (岩淵 功, born 1933), Japanese tennis player
- Kensuke Iwabuchi (岩渕 健輔, born 1975), Japanese rugby union player and coach
- Mana Iwabuchi (岩渕 真奈, born 1993), Japanese women's footballer
- Reira Iwabuchi (岩渕 麗楽, born 2001), Japanese snowboarder
- Ryota Iwabuchi (岩渕 良太, born 1990), Japanese footballer
- Sanji Iwabuchi (岩淵 三次, 1895–1945), Imperial Japanese Navy admiral
- Satoshi Iwabuchi (岩渕 聡, born 1975), Japanese tennis player
- Yumi Iwabuchi (岩渕 有美, born 1979), Japanese softball player
