= Natalie Ward =

Natalie Ward may refer to:

- Natalie Ward (softball) (born 1975), Australian Olympic softball player
- Natalie Ward (politician), Australian politician from New South Wales
