= Jodie Bowering =

Australian softball player (born 1982)

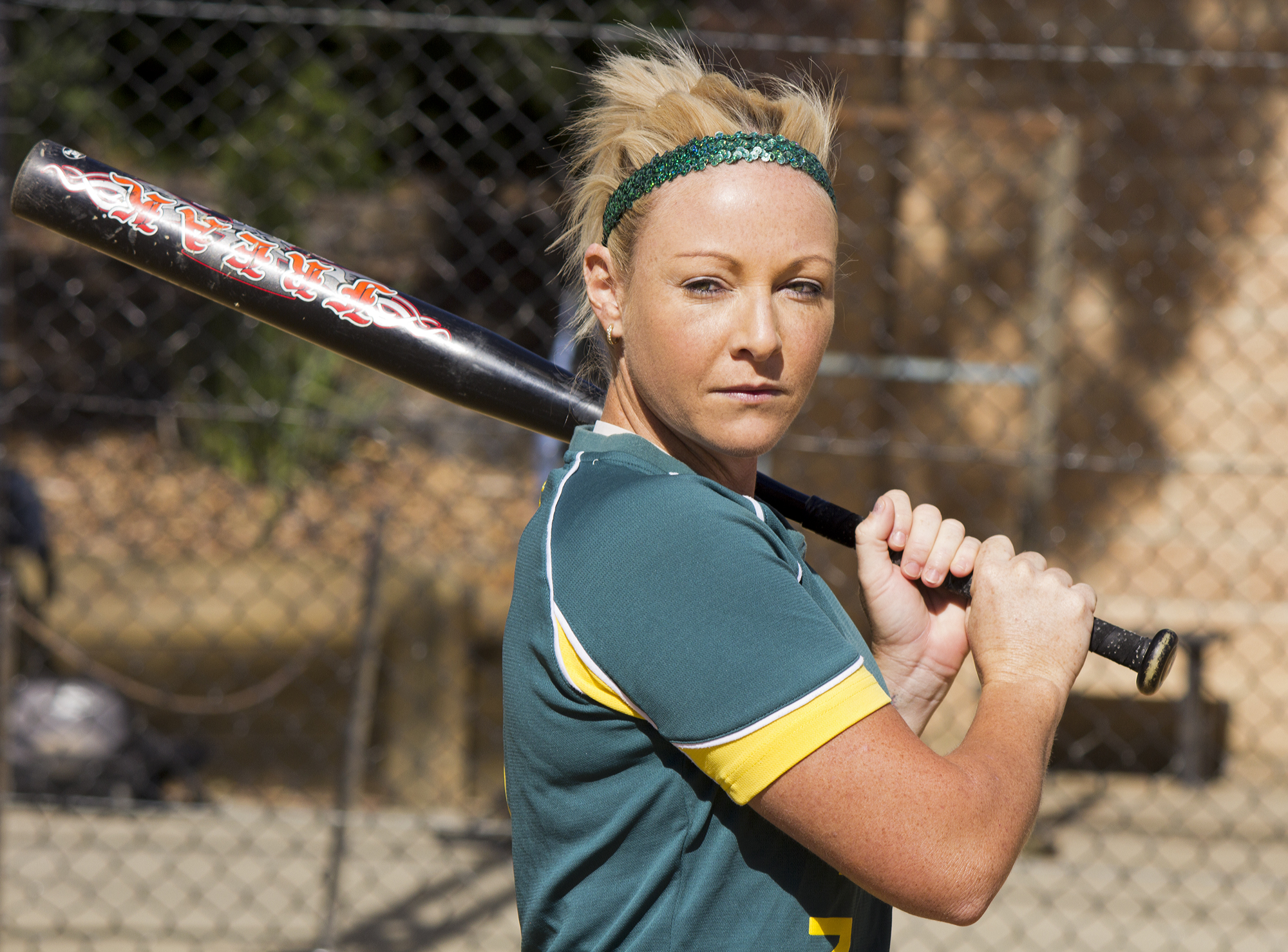
- Bowering in March 2012 during a photoshoot

Personal information
- Nationality: Australian
- Born: July 1982 (age 44)

Sport
- Country: Australia
- Sport: Softball
- Event: Women's team
Medal record
Softball
Representing Australia
Olympics
Bronze medal – third place	2008 Beijing	Team

Jodie Bowering (born July 1982 in Queensland) is an Australian softball player. She is a physical education and health teacher who has played softball at the state, national and international level. In national competitions, she represents Queensland. As a member of Australia's 2008 team, she won a bronze medal in Beijing. She was a member of the national team and competed at the 2012 and 2014 Women's Softball World Championships.

== Personal ==
Bowering was born in July 1982 in Queensland. She resides in the Boondall / Redcliffe, Queensland area. Her mother, Carol Draper, is a champion waterskier.

Bowering is a physical education and health teacher and taught at North Lakes State College in 2008, 2009, 2010, 2011, 2012 and 2013. She took a year off between 2009 and 2010 when she worked for the Queensland government to help train physical education teachers.

== Softball ==
Bowering's mother got her involved with tee-ball as an eventual gateway to softball as a six-year-old. At the time, her mother was playing club softball. In 2008, she competed in the Queensland Open Women's State Championships where she played for the Brisbane side. She had a scholarship with and played for the Australian Institute of Sport team in 2008 and 2009. She represents Queensland in national competitions. In 2007, she represented the state in the Gilleys Shield. She was a member of the Queensland team in 2008. She was part of the 2012 side that finished third at the Gilleys Shield.

Bowering has represented Australia on the national level as a member of the Australia women's national softball team. She was with the team in 2007 and participated in a six-game test series against China in the Redlands. This was her first international competition with the team. She won a bronze medal at the 2008 Summer Olympics, and attended the welcome home Olympian parade in Adelaide. In March 2009, she participated in a Brisbane-based training camp. She was with the team in 2010 when they completed an 11-day tour of California. She represented Australia at the 2009 World Cup of Softball. Australia took home a silver in the competition. She was a member of the team that competed at the 2010 Women's World Softball Championship. She is a member of the 2012 Australia women's national softball team. She participated in the March 2012 seven game test series against Japan in Canberra. She represented the country at the 2012 and 2014 ISF Women's World Championships.
