= Gillian Boxx =

American softball player

Personal information
- Full name: Gillian Dewey Boxx
- Born: September 1, 1973 (age 52) Fontana, California, U.S.
- Height: 5 ft 7 in (170 cm)
Medal record
Women's softball
Representing the United States
Olympic Games
Gold medal – first place	1996 Atlanta	Team competition

Gillian Dewey Boxx (born September 1, 1973) is an American, former collegiate four-time All-American, Gold Medal winning 1996 Olympian, right-handed softball catcher, originally from Torrance, California. She won an Olympic gold medal as a catcher on the United States women's national softball team at the 1996 Summer Olympics in Atlanta, Georgia. Boxx played collegiate softball at the University of California at Berkeley from 1992-95 in the Pac-12 Conference, where she ranks in several records and was a Second Team and three-time First Team All-Conference athlete. She is also the older sister of former United States Women's National Soccer Team midfielder Shannon Boxx.

== Statistics ==
=== California Golden Bears ===
YEAR	G	AB	R	H	BA	RBI	HR	3B	2B	TB	SLG	BB	SO	SB	SBA
1992	62	171	24	47	.275	22	0	1	12	61	.356%	19	17	8	10
1993	57	183	44	65	.355	44	4	2	12	93	.508%	21	17	12	13
1994	61	195	32	72	.369	42	1	2	7	86	.441%	29	8	9	13
1995	62	193	56	90	.466	38	7	4	13	132	.684%	36	2	3	6
TOTALS	242	742	156	274	.369	146	12	9	44	372	.501%	105	44	32	42

=== Team USA ===
YEAR	G	AB	R	H	BA	RBI	HR	3B	2B	TB	SLG	BB	SO
1996 OLYMPICS	6	13	2	4	.308	3	0	0	1	5	.384%	0	3
