= Laura Berg =

American softball coach and player

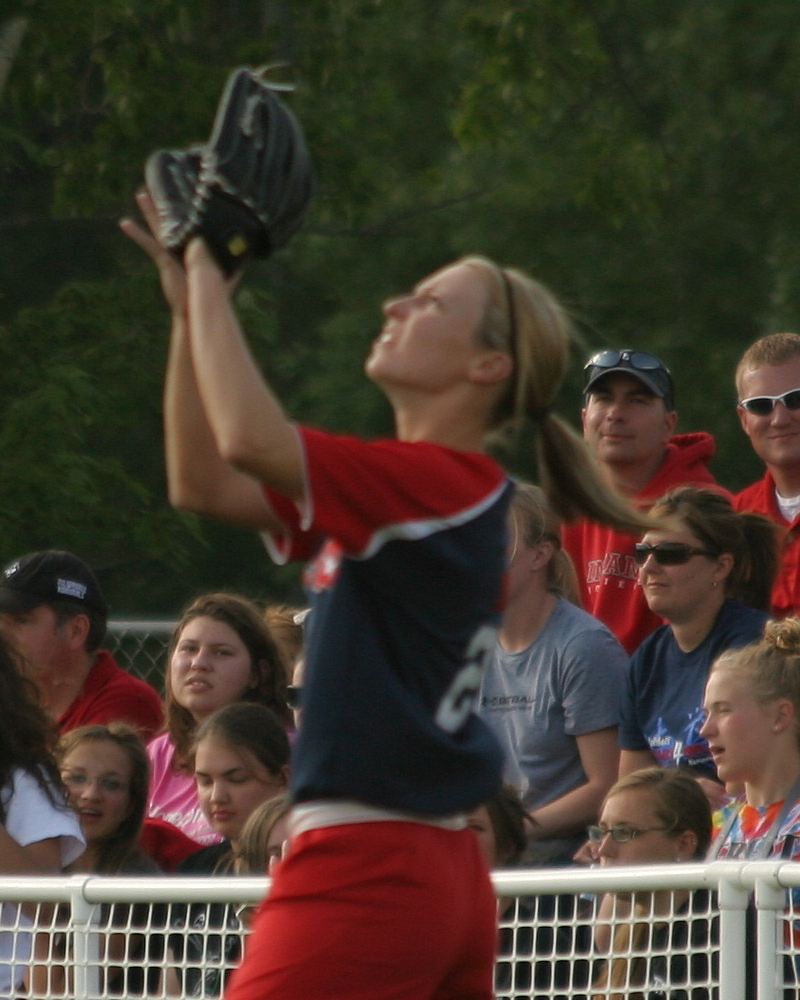
- Berg in 2008

Current position
- Title: Head coach
- Team: Oregon State
- Conference: Pac-12
- Record: 166–156–1 (.515)

Biographical details
- Born: January 6, 1975 (age 51); Whittier, California, U.S.

Playing career
- 1994–1995: Fresno State
- 1997–1998: Fresno State
- 2001: WPSL Gold
- Position: Outfielder

Coaching career (HC unless noted)

College Softball
- 2000–2003: Fresno State (asst.)
- 2006: Fresno State (asst.)
- 2012: Oregon State (asst.)
- 2013–present: Oregon State

National Softball
- 2019: USA Women's Softball (asst.)

Head coaching record
- Overall: 166–156–1 (.515)
- Tournaments: NCAA: 3–8 (.273)

Accomplishments and honors

Championships
- As player: Women's College World Series (1998)

Awards
- As player: 3× first-team All-American (1995, 1997, 1998); Third-team All-American (1994)
Medal record
Women's softball
Representing United States
Olympic Games
Gold medal – first place	1996 Atlanta	Team competition
Gold medal – first place	2000 Sydney	Team competition
Gold medal – first place	2004 Athens	Team competition
Silver medal – second place	2008 Beijing	Team competition
ISF Women's World Championship
Gold medal – first place	1994 St. John's	Team competition
Gold medal – first place	1998 Fujinomiya	Team competition
Gold medal – first place	2002 Saskatoon	Team competition
Gold medal – first place	2006 Beijing	Team competition
Pan-American Games
Gold medal – first place	1999 Winnipeg	Team competition
Gold medal – first place	2003 Santo Domingo	Team competition
Gold medal – first place	2007 Rio de Janeiro	Team competition

Laura Kay Berg (born January 6, 1975) is an American college softball head coach for Oregon State and a former collegiate four-time All-American and Olympian. She played for the Fresno State Bulldogs from 1994–98, where she won the 1998 Women's College World Series and owns the Western Athletic Conference career records in hits, runs and triples. She is one of only four women to have won four Olympic medals in softball, having won a medal at every Olympics the sport was contested. She is second all-time in NCAA Division I career hits and at-bats. She is also a USA Softball Hall of Fame honoree.

== Fresno State ==
Berg was born in Whittier, California and raised in nearby Santa Fe Springs, graduating from Santa Fe High School in 1993. Berg and her twin sister enrolled at Fresno State and started for the school's softball team. In her first season, she was named a National Fastpitch Coaches Association Third Team All-American. The Bulldogs made it to the WCWS and took their first game before dropping back-to-back shutout games against eventual champions the Arizona Wildcats and the Oklahoma State Cowgirls on May 27, 1994. Berg had two hits in the tournament.

As a sophomore, Berg would earn First Team All-American honors while hitting over .400 and setting a new school season record for triples, which also led the WAC conference. She currently still claims that record.

After red-shirting to compete at the 1996 Atlanta Olympics, Berg returned and once again earned NFCA First Team honors. She joined school elite with top-5 season records in batting average, hits (led the WAC), doubles and triples. She also managed to reach the 7th best season hits total all-time for an NCAA season, which now ranks in the top-15.

In her second WCWS appearance, Berg and the Bulldogs were shutout in their first game but rebounded strongly by winning their next three including shutting out eventual champion Arizona Wildcats in the semifinals. Berg hit a double and scored the eventual winning run. In the second game of the doubleheader, Berg singled in her first two at-bats and scored each time to take the lead, however, Arizona tied the score immediately and went on to win 6–3 on May 25, 1997.

For her senior campaign, Berg was named 1998 First Team All-American for a final time. The senior achieved a career best batting average (led the WAC as well as a school record in runs. Her stolen bases ranked top-5 for a Bulldog season. Beginning April 17 until May 8, Berg would go on a 29 consecutive game hit streak, a career best and the NCAA's 6th best all-time.

Returning to the WCWS, the team began its march by defeating the Nebraska Cornhuskers 6–1 on May 21 with Berg scoring the eventual winning run. They mercy ruled Michigan Wolverines before losing to the Washington Huskies in the semifinals on May 24. Berg and teammates responded by besting the Huskies by 5 runs in the rematch, Berg led off with a single and helped stake the Bulldogs to a first-inning two-run lead to make it into their school's 5th finals appearance.

Berg had a hit and won the title on teammate Nina Lindenberg's solo home run to defeat the two-time defending champions the Arizona Wildcats. For the tournament, Berg hit .470 (8/17) with 2 RBIs to be named All-Tournament.

Berg would graduate as the school career record holder in hits, triples, runs and stolen bases. She also was tops in conference career hits, triples, runs, at-bats as well as the third best average all-time. Her NCAA career puts her second in hits and at-bats all-time for a career.

== National team ==
Berg would also join the United States national team in 1994, participating in the 1994 ISF Women's World Championship, where the US team won the gold medal. Berg redshirted at Fresno State in 1996, the year that she won her first Olympic gold at the 1996 Atlanta Olympics. In 1998, she won her second gold medal at the world championships. At the 1999 Pan American Games Berg performed well in the gold medal effort, batting .375 for the tournament with 15 hits. In the 2000 Summer Olympics Berg drove in the winning run in the 8th inning of the gold medal game.

From 2000 to 2003 she participated at tournaments with the national team. She added gold medals at the 2002 World Championships and 2003 Pan American Games to her resume, batting .471 in the Pan-Americans. In the 2004 Athens Olympics she started eight of the nine games, batting .368, and held a perfect fielding average. In the gold medal game on August 23, Berg had a hit in the eventual win over Australia. In 2006 Berg won her fourth consecutive World Championship in Beijing. Berg's four World Championship appearances is a record for the event.

In 2007 Berg returned to her third Pan American Games, where she won another gold medal, and was chosen to carry the U.S. flag during the closing ceremonies. At the 2008 Summer Olympics, she captured a silver medal with the Team USA, the only time in Olympic history the United States did not win the gold medal. Berg did not play in the gold medal game but did hit .500 for the tournament highlighted by a diving catch to save Monica Abbott's perfect game vs. the Netherlands on August 17. After the finals, Berg along with teammates retired from international competition.

== Coaching ==
Berg joined the staff at the Oregon State Beavers program in 2011. In 2012, she helped coach them to a regional appearance.

She was named Oregon State's head coach on August 27, 2012.

== Personal life ==
Berg was an assistant coach at Fresno State from 2000–2003, as she continued to participate with Team USA. She returned to her alma mater coaching staff for 2005 and 2006 seasons. Eventually she left her post to train with the national team. Berg was invited to be an assistant coach with Team USA in 2012, helping them win a World Cup.

In 2006, Berg was named to 25th Anniversary WCWS Team. In 2012, she along with her 2004 Team USA teammates were named to the Olympics Hall of Fame.

== Awards and honors ==
- 2005 International Sports Invitational Champion
- 2001 Played for WPSL Gold Professional Team consisting of 2000 Olympians
- WAC Champions – Fresno State
- Second FSU player to record 100 or more hits in a season
- 4-Time NFCA All-American (3 First-Team; Third-Team)
- 4-Time NCAA All-Regional Team
- 25th WCWS Anniversary Team
- Olympic Hall of Fame (2004 Team USA)
- Fresno County Athletic Hall of Fame (2009)

== Statistics ==
=== Fresno State Bulldogs ===
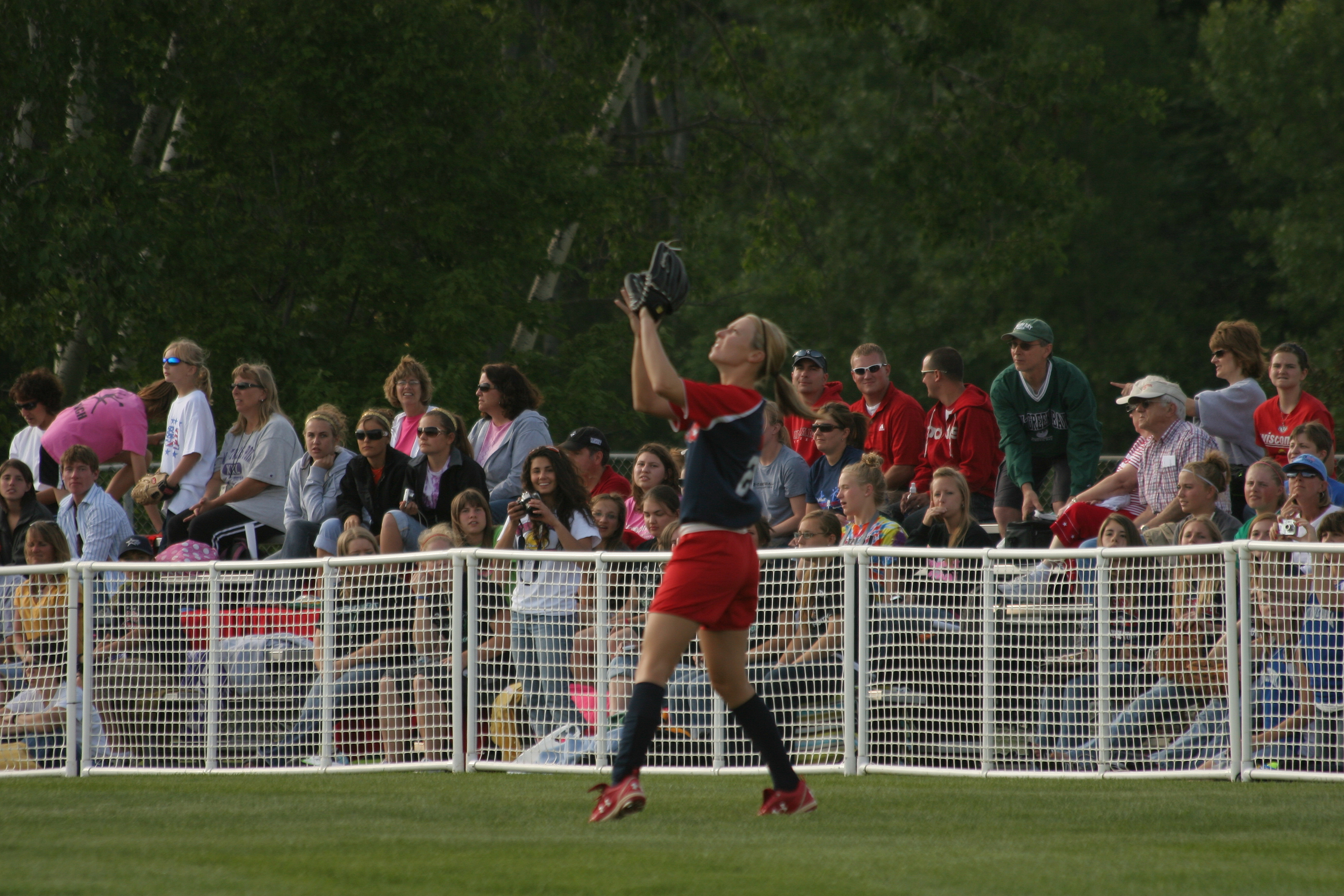
Berg attempting to catch a ball during practice.

YEAR	G	AB	R	H	BA	RBI	HR	3B	2B	TB	SLG	BB	SO	SB	SBA
1994	65	238	42	83	.348	20	2	5	4	103	.433%	4	8	5	6
1995	69	238	62	101	.424	31	1	11	13	139	.584%	10	3	11	13
1997	69	245	69	104	.424	34	2	7	16	140	.571%	5	2	7	8
1998	63	236	72	108	.457	16	1	2	3	118	.500%	2	4	16	17
TOTALS	266	957	245	396	.414	101	6	25	36	500	.522%	21	17	39	44

=== Team USA ===
YEAR	AB	R	H	BA	RBI	HR	3B	2B	TB	SLG	BB	SO	SB	SBA
1996	22	2	6	.272	0	0	0	1	7	.318%	0	0	0	0
2000	38	2	6	.158	0	0	0	0	6	.158%	0	2	0	0
2004	130	37	47	.361	23	2	1	3	55	.423%	2	2	4	4
2008	100	59	46	.460	11	0	2	4	54	.540%	7	3	1	2
TOTALS	290	100	105	.362	34	2	3	8	125	.431%	9	7	5	6

== Head coaching record ==
Record table
Season	Team	Overall	Conference	Standing	Postseason
Oregon State Beavers (Pac-12 Conference) (2013–present)
2013	Oregon State	34–24	8–16	8th	NCAA Regional
2014	Oregon State	18–31	5–17	7th	
2015	Oregon State	26–26	6–18	8th	
2016	Oregon State	30–20–1	9–14	7th	NCAA Regional
2017	Oregon State	28–27	9–15	T–6th	NCAA Regional
2018	Oregon State	30–28	9–14	6th	NCAA Regional
2019	Oregon State	26–19	8–14	6th	
2020	Oregon State	17–9	0–0		Season canceled due to COVID-19
2021	Oregon State	20–26	7–17	7th	
2022	Oregon State	39–22	9–15	6th	Women's College World Series
Oregon State:		268–232–1 (.536)	70–140 (.333)		
Total:		268–232–1 (.536)			
National champion Postseason invitational champion Conference regular season champion Conference regular season and conference tournament champion Division regular season champion Division regular season and conference tournament champion Conference tournament champion

== See also ==
- NCAA Division I softball career .400 batting average list
