= Softball at the 2004 Summer Olympics =

Softball at the Games of the XXVIII Olympiad
- Venue: Olympic Softball Stadium
- Dates: 14 – 23 August 2004
- Competitors: 120 from 8 nations

Medalists
1st place, gold medalist(s)		United States
2nd place, silver medalist(s)		Australia
3rd place, bronze medalist(s)		Japan

Softball was a women's sporting event at the 2004 Summer Olympics. Games were played at the softball stadium in the Helliniko Olympic Complex from August 14 to 23. The United States won the gold while Australia took silver and Japan received bronze.

Softball was one of the three sports at the 2004 Athens Olympics that was for women only along with Synchronized Swimming and Rhythmic Gymnastics. Eight teams competed for the gold medal in only the third appearance of softball at the Summer Olympics. The softball competition featured 120 athletes.

Japanese pitcher Yukiko Ueno threw a perfect game—the first at an Olympics’ softball competition—in a preliminary round match against China. The United States dominated the overall competition, winning all seven of its preliminary matches and defeating Australia twice in the medal round.

== Medalists ==
Gold	Silver	Bronze
United States Leah Amico; Laura Berg; Crystl Bustos; Lisa Fernandez; Jennie Finch; Tairia Flowers; Amanda Freed; Lori Harrigan; Lovieanne Jung; Kelly Kretschman; Jessica Mendoza; Stacey Nuveman; Cat Osterman; Jenny Topping; Natasha Watley	Australia Sandra Allen; Marissa Carpadios; Fiona Crawford; Amanda Doman; Peta Edebone; Tanya Harding; Natalie Hodgskin; Simmone Morrow; Tracey Mosley; Stacey Porter; Melanie Roche; Natalie Titcume; Natalie Ward; Brooke Wilkins; Kerry Wyborn	Japan Emi Inui; Kazue Ito; Yumi Iwabuchi; Masumi Mishina; Emi Naito; Haruka Saito; Hiroko Sakai; Naoko Sakamoto; Rie Sato; Yuki Sato; Juri Takayama; Yukiko Ueno; Reika Utsugi; Eri Yamada; Noriko Yamaji

In one of the most dominating runs in softball history, the United States team led by head coach Mike Candrea won the gold medal by defeating Australia 5-1 in the championship game on August 23. It was the first time in 9 games that an opponent scored a run against Team USA. Crystl Bustos hit two home runs to provide all the run-support that pitcher Lisa Fernandez required. Fernandez pitched all six innings, picking up her second win against Australia in as many days. She also won the semi-final game.

Throughout the tournament Team USA outscored its opponents 51-1. Team USA won the Olympic gold medal in softball for the third straight time.

Australia's silver medal marks its best result in Olympic softball history. Japan earned the bronze medal after defeating China in the semi-final, and losing to Australia in the Bronze medal game.

== Participants ==
- Australia
- Canada
- China
- Greece
- Chinese Taipei
- Italy
- Japan
- United States

== Results ==
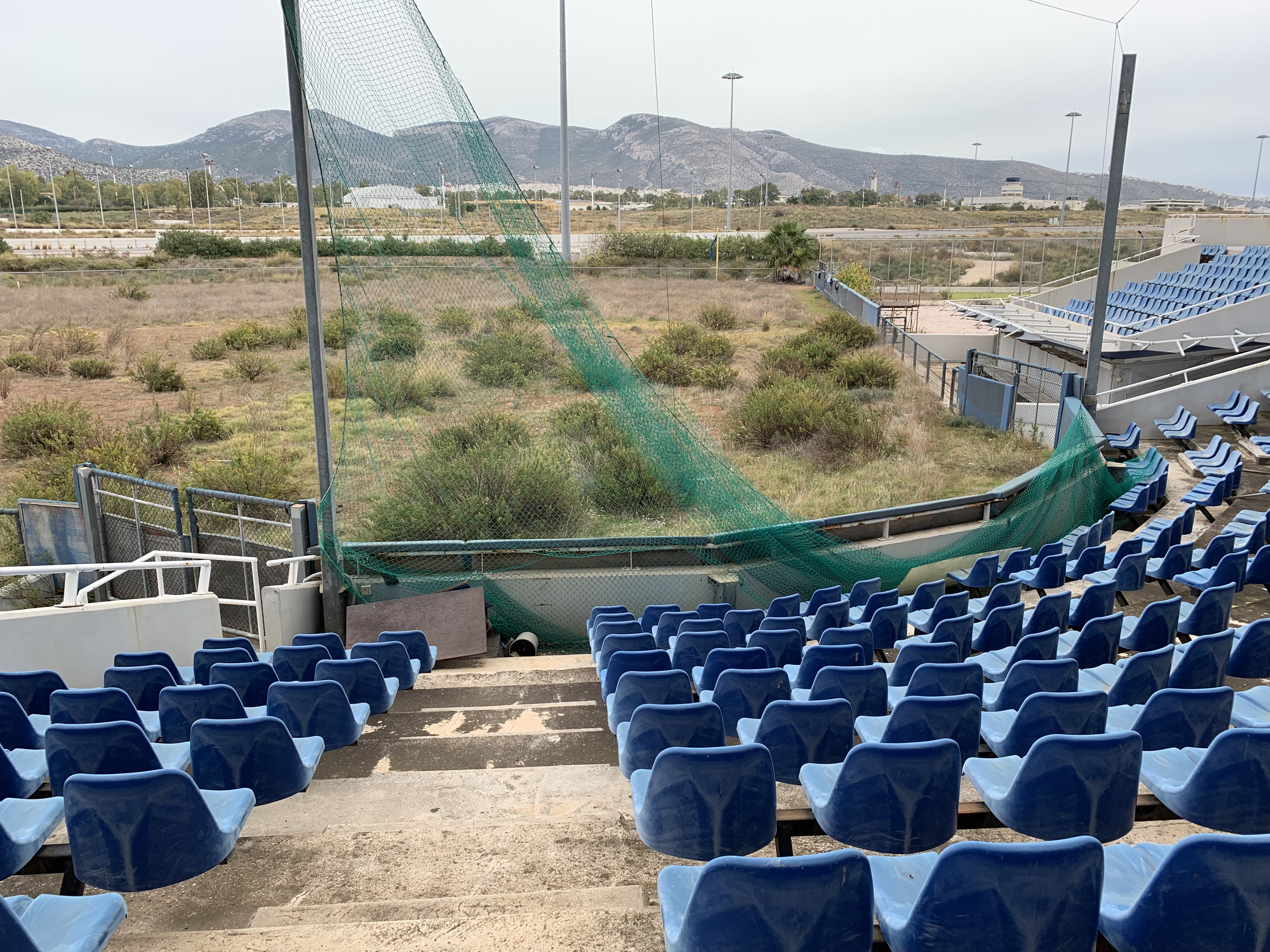
Olympic Softball Stadium at the Helliniko Olympic Complex - shown abandoned in November 2018.

Starting August 14, there were four preliminary games each day until August 20 for a total of 28 games. Two semi-final games were played August 22, with the game for third place following later that day. The final game for the gold medal was played on August 23 at 4pm local time.

=== Standings ===
Qualified for the semifinals
Eliminated

Team	W	L	RS	RA	WIN%	Tiebreaker
United States	7	0	41	0	1.000	-
Australia	6	1	22	14	.857	-
Japan	4	3	17	8	.571	-
China	3	4	15	20	.429	1–0
Canada	3	4	6	14	.429	0–1
Chinese Taipei	2	5	3	13	.286	1–0
Greece	2	5	6	24	.286	0–1
Italy	1	6	8	24	.143	-

=== Preliminary round ===
==== August 14 ====
Team	1	2	3	4	5	6	7	R	H	E
Australia	0	1	0	2	1	0	0	4	7	0
Japan	2	0	0	0	0	0	0	2	0	2
WP: Tanya Harding (1-0) LP: Yukiko Ueno (0-1); Home runs: AUS: N.Titcume in 4th, 1 RBI; JPN: None

Team	1	2	3	4	5	6	7	R	H	E
Italy	0	0	0	0	0	-	-	0	3	2
United States	1	3	0	0	3	-	-	7	11	0
WP: Jennie Finch (1-0) LP: Leslie Malerich (0-1)

Team	1	2	3	4	5	6	7	R	H	E
Chinese Taipei	0	0	0	0	0	0	0	0	4	1
Canada	0	0	0	2	0	0	X	2	5	0
WP: Lauren Bay (1-0) LP: Wu Chia-Yen (0-1)

Team	1	2	3	4	5	6	7	R	H	E
Greece	0	0	0	0	0	0	0	0	2	6
China	0	1	1	0	3	0	X	5	5	1
WP: Lu Wei (1-0) LP: Sarah Farnworth (0-1)

==== August 15 ====
Team	1	2	3	4	5	6	7	R	H	E
Chinese Taipei	0	0	0	0	0	0	0	0	2	4
Japan	1	4	0	0	1	0	X	6	13	0
WP: Sakai Hiroko (1-0) LP: Lin Su-Hua (0-1); Home runs: TPE: N.Titcume in 4th, 1 RBI; JPN: None

Team	1	2	3	4	5	6	7	R	H	E
Italy	0	6	0	0	0	0	1	7	9	3
China	0	0	0	0	5	0	0	5	5	1
WP: Jennifer Spediacci (1-0) LP: Li Qi (0-1)

Team	1	2	3	4	5	6	7	R	H	E
Australia	0	0	0	0	0	-	-	0	1	0
United States	2	0	0	8	X	-	-	10	9	2
WP: Lisa Fernandez (1-0) LP: Brooke Wilkins (0-1); Home runs: AUS: None; USA: Stacey Nuveman in 4th, 3 RBI

Team	1	2	3	4	5	6	7	R	H	E
Canada	0	0	0	0	0	0	0	0	3	4
Greece	0	1	0	0	1	0	X	2	3	0
WP: Sarah Farnworth (1-1) LP: Kaila Holtz (0-1)

==== August 16 ====
09:30

Team	1	2	3	4	5	6	7	R	H	E
China	0	0	0	0	0	4	0	4	4	0
Canada	0	0	0	0	0	0	0	0	4	2
W: Zhang Lixia (1-0) L: Lauren Bay (1-1)
Home Run
none

12:00

Team	1	2	3	4	5	6	7	8	R	H	E
United States	0	0	0	0	0	0	0	3	3	3	0
Japan	0	0	0	0	0	0	0	0	0	1	3
W: Catherine Osterman (1-0) L: Juri Takayama (0-1)
Home Run
none

17:00

Team	1	2	3	4	5	6	7	R	H	E
Italy	0	0	0	0	1	0	0	1	6	0
Greece	2	0	0	0	0	0	X	2	5	3
W: Sarah Farnworth (2-1) L: Susan Bugliarello (0-1)
Home Run
none

19:30

Team	1	2	3	4	5	6	7	R	H	E
Taiwan	0	0	0	0	0	0	0	0	2	0
Australia	0	0	0	1	0	0	X	1	4	0
W: Wu Chia-Yen (0-2) L: Tanya Harding (2-0)
Home Run
none

==== August 17 ====
09:30

Team	1	2	3	4	5	6	7	R	H	E
China	0	0	0	0	0	0	0	0	1	1
United States	2	1	0	0	1	0	X	4	5	1
W: Lori Harrigan (1-0) L: Zhang Lixia (1-1)
Home Run
USA 1 : C.Bustos in 5th, 1 RBI

12:00

Team	1	2	3	4	5	6	7	8	R	H	E
Canada	0	0	0	0	0	0	0	1	1	1	2
Japan	0	0	0	0	0	0	0	0	0	3	1
W: Lauren Bay (2-1) L: Yukiko Ueno (0-2)
Home Run
none

17:00

Team	1	2	3	4	5	6	7	R	H	E
Taiwan	0	0	0	0	0	0	2	2	3	1
Greece	0	0	0	1	0	0	X	0	5	1
W: Lai Sheng-Jung (1-0) L: Sarah Farnworth (2-2)
Home Run
none

19:30

Team	1	2	3	4	5	R	H	E
Australia	2	2	2	0	2	8	10	1
Italy	0	0	0	0	0	0	2	1
Game end by Run Ahead Rule
W: Melanie Roche (1-0) L: Jennifer Spediacci (0-1)
Home Run
AUS 2 : S.Porter in 1st, 2 RBI;N.Titcume in 5th, 2 RBI

==== August 18 ====
09:30

Team	1	2	3	4	5	6	7	R	H	E
Italy	0	0	0	0	0	0	0	0	5	1
Taiwan	0	0	0	1	0	0	X	1	4	0
W: Lin Su-Hua (1-1) L: Susan Bugliarello (0-2)
Home Run
none

12:00

Team	1	2	3	4	5	6	7	8	R	H	E
Australia	0	0	0	0	0	0	0	5	5	4	0
China	0	0	0	0	0	0	0	0	0	1	2
W: Melanie Roche (2-0) L: Lu Wei (1-1)
Home Run
none

17:00

Team	1	2	3	4	5	R	H	E
Canada	0	0	0	0	0	0	1	1
United States	1	2	1	2	1	7	11	1
Game ended by Run Ahead Rule
W: Jennie Finch (2-0) L: Auburn Sigurdson (0-1)
Home Run
USA 2 : C.Bustos in 4th, 1 RBI;L.Fernandez in 4th, 1 RBI

19:30

Team	1	2	3	4	5	6	7	R	H	E
Japan	0	3	1	0	0	0	2	6	12	1
Greece	0	0	0	0	0	0	X	0	2	3
W: Hiroko Sakai (2-0) L: Sarah Farnworth (2-3)
Home Run
none

==== August 19 ====
09:30

Team	1	2	3	4	5	6	7	R	H	E
Taiwan	0	0	0	0	0	0	0	0	1	2
China	0	0	0	0	1	0	X	1	4	0
W: Lu Wei (2-1) L: Lai Sheng-Jung (1-1)
Home Run
none

12:00

Team	1	2	3	4	5	R	H	E
Greece	0	0	0	0	0	0	1	1
United States	0	0	1	3	3	7	9	0
Game ended by Run Ahead Rule
W: Lisa Fernandez (2-0) L: Stephanie Skegas-Maxwell (0-1)
Home Run
none

17:00

Team	1	2	3	4	5	6	7	R	H	E
Italy	0	0	0	0	0	0	0	0	3	0
Japan	0	0	1	0	0	0	0	1	8	1
W: Yukiko Ueno (1-2) L: Jennifer Spediacci (1-2)
Home Run
none

19:30

Team	1	2	3	4	5	6	7	R	H	E
Australia	0	1	0	0	0	0	0	1	4	0
Canada	0	0	0	0	0	0	0	0	5	0
W: Melanie Roche (3-0) L: Lauren Bay (2-2)
Home Run
none

==== August 20 ====
09:30

Team	1	2	3	4	5	6	7	R	H	E
Italy	0	0	0	0	0	0	0	0	2	0
Canada	0	0	0	1	0	0	X	1	1	1
W: Lauren Bay (3-2) L: Susan Bugliarello (0-3)
Home Run
none

12:00

Team	1	2	3	4	5	6	7	R	H	E
Taiwan	0	0	0	0	0	0	0	0	4	2
United States	0	0	0	1	1	1	X	3	8	1
W: Catherine Osterman (2-0) L: Wu Chia-Yen (0-3)
Home Run
USA 1 : C.Bustos in 4th, 1 RBI

17:00

Team	1	2	3	4	5	6	7	R	H	E
Greece	2	0	0	0	0	0	0	2	4	2
Australia	0	0	1	2	0	0	X	3	7	1
W: Tanya Harding (3-0) L: Sarah Farnworth (2-4)
Home Run
AUS 2 : T.Mosley in 4th, 2 RBI;S.Porter in 3rd, 1 RBI

19:30

Team	1	2	3	4	5	6	7	R	H	E
China	0	0	0	0	0	0	0	0	0	0
Japan	0	0	0	0	1	1	X	2	8	0
W: Yukiko Ueno (1-2)** L: Lu Wei (2-2)
Home Run
none

** Perfect game

== Medal round ==
The semi-final game between the #3 and #4 ranked teams (Japan and China) is an elimination game, with the loser out. The winner faces the loser of the other semifinal in the bronze medal game later Sunday night. The loser of the bronze medal game received the bronze medal. The winner of that game faces the winner of the Australia versus the United States semifinal in the gold medal game, with the winner of that game receiving gold and the loser receiving silver.

Semifinals
1	United States	5
2	Australia	0
3	Japan	1
4	China	0

Bronze medal game
2	Australia	3
3	Japan	0

Gold medal game
2	Australia	1
1	United States	5

=== Semifinals ===
August 22 9:30

Team	1	2	3	4	5	6	7	8	R	H	E
Japan	0	0	0	0	0	0	0	1	1	6	0
China	0	0	0	0	0	0	0	0	0	3	4
W: Yukiko Ueno (2-2) L: Lu Wei (2-3)
Home Run
none

August 22 12:20

Team	1	2	3	4	5	6	7	R	H	E
Australia	0	0	0	0	0	0	0	0	3	0
United States	0	0	0	1	3	1	x	5	8	0
W: Lisa Fernandez (3-0) L: Melanie Roche (3-1)
Home Run
USA: K. Kretschman in 6th, 1 RBI

=== Bronze medal game ===
August 22 17:00

Team	1	2	3	4	5	6	7	R	H	E
Australia	0	0	0	0	3	0	0	3	4	0
Japan	0	0	0	0	0	0	0	0	3	1
W: Tanya Harding (4-0) L: Juri Takayama (1-2)
Home Run
none

=== Gold medal game ===
August 23 16:00

Team	1	2	3	4	5	6	7	R	H	E
Australia	0	0	0	0	0	1	0	1	4	1
United States	3	0	2	0	0	0	x	5	9	0
W: Lisa Fernandez (4-0) L: Tanya Harding (4-1)
Home Run
USA : C.Bustos in 1st, 2 RBI; C.Bustos in 3rd, 1 RBI; S.Nuveman in 3rd, 1 RBI

== See also ==
- Baseball at the 2004 Summer Olympics
