= Peta Edebone =

Australian softball player

Medal record

Representing Australia

Women's Softball

Olympic Games
Bronze medal – third place	1996 Atlanta	Team
Bronze medal – third place	2000 Sydney	Team
Silver medal – second place	2004 Athens	Team

Peta Louise Edebone OAM (born 9 February 1969 in Melbourne, Victoria) is a softball player from Australia, who won a bronze medal at the 1996 Summer Olympics and 2000 Summer Olympics and a silver medal at the 2004 Summer Olympics. She was captain of the 2004 squad.

After having knee surgery after Athens, she retired from competitive softball. In Sydney, she hit 4 home runs, which tied the current record. The record was broken at the 2004 Summer Olympics by Crystl Bustos.

Edebone is to participate in the annual Victorian Women's Football League Metro vs Country match as a curtain-raiser to Collingwood Football Club vs Carlton Football Club in Round 7 at the Melbourne Cricket Ground on 12 May 2007.
