= Sally McDermid =

Australian softball player

Personal information
- Born: 6 June 1965 (age 61) Mytholmroyd, Yorkshire, England
Medal record
Women's softball
Representing Australia
Olympic Games
Bronze medal – third place	1996 Atlanta	Team
Bronze medal – third place	2000 Sydney	Team

Sally McDermid (born 6 June 1965) is a former softball outfielder and third baseman from Australia. She won a bronze medal at the 1996 Summer Olympics and 2000 Summer Olympics. She is also known as Sally McCreedy.
