= Natalie Titcume =

Australian softball player

Medal record

Women's softball

Representing Australia

Olympic Games
Bronze medal – third place	2000 Sydney	Team
Silver medal – second place	2004 Athens	Team
Bronze medal – third place	2008 Beijing	Team

Natalie Titcume (born 6 December 1975 in Sydney) is a softball player from Australia 350 games, who won a bronze medal 2000 Sydney Olympics, a silver medal at the 2004 Athens Olympics and bronze at the 2008 Beijing Olympics. She plays catcher and 3rd base. Natalie is Director of High Performance and Sports Academies at Bishop Druitt College, Coffs Harbour. She has a partner Daniella and son Jagger.
