= Marissa Carpadios =

Australian softball player

Medal record

Representing Australia

Women's Softball

Olympic Games
Silver medal – second place	2004 Athens	Team

Marissa Carpadios (born 30 December 1977 in Brisbane) is a softball player from Australia, who won a silver medal at the 2004 Summer Olympics. She was educated at Brisbane State High School.
