= Kristi DeVries =

American-Dutch softball player (born 1982)

Kristi Lynn DeVries (born March 26, 1982) is an American-Dutch softball player who has represented the Netherlands women's national softball team in international competitions.

Born in Fontana, California, DeVries grew up in Corona, California and graduated from Corona High School in 2000. She played college softball at Ohio State University from 2001 to 2004. Beginning in 2005, she played professionally for Sparks Haarlem. She is a pitcher and first baseman who bats and throws right-handed. She competes for the Dutch national team since 2003. In 2003 and 2004 she was the best pitcher of the Ohio State University. She is part of the Dutch team for the 2008 Summer Olympics in Beijing.
