= Amanda Doman =

Australian softball player (born 1977)

Medal record

Representing Australia

Women's Softball

Olympic Games
Silver medal – second place	2004 Athens	Team

Amanda Doman (born 24 October 1977 in Gladstone, Queensland) is a softball player from Australia, who won a silver medal at the 2004 Summer Olympics.
