= Simmone Morrow =

Australian softball player

Medal record

Representing Australia

Women's Softball

Olympic Games
Bronze medal – third place	2000 Sydney	Team
Silver medal – second place	2004 Athens	Team
Bronze medal – third place	2008 Beijing	Team

Simmone Morrow (born 31 October 1976 in Cowell, South Australia) is a softball player from Australia, who won a bronze medal at the 2000 Summer Olympics and a silver medal at the 2004 Summer Olympics. She plays in the outfield.
