= Kerry Wyborn =

Australian softball player

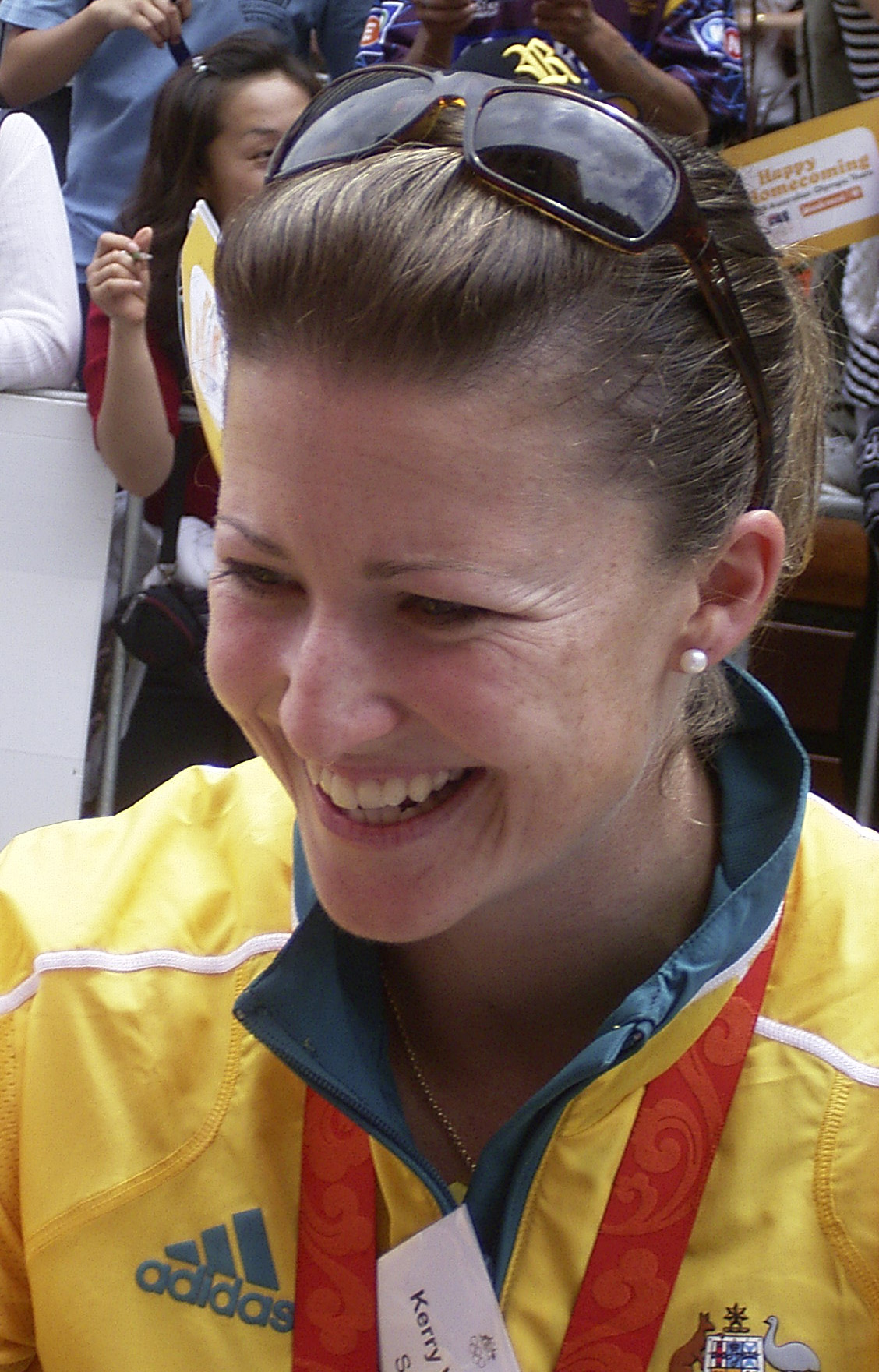

Medal record

Representing Australia

Women's Softball

Olympic Games
Silver medal – second place	2004 Athens	Team
Bronze medal – third place	2008 Beijing	Team

Kerry Wyborn (born 22 December 1977 in Auburn, New South Wales) is a softball player from Australia. Also known as Kerry Newsome, she won a silver medal at the 2004 Summer Olympics and a bronze medal at the 2008 Summer Olympics.
