= Sandy Lewis (softball) =

Australian softball player

Medal record

Representing Australia

Women's softball

Olympic Games
Silver medal – second place	2004 Athens	Team
Bronze medal – third place	2000 Sydney	Team
Bronze medal – third place	2008 Beijing	Team

Sandra Lewis (born Sandra Louise Allen; 11 October 1978 in Sydney, Australia) is a softball player from Australia, who won a silver medal at the 2004 Summer Olympics, and bronze medals at the 2000 and 2008 Summer Olympics.

In 2003 she was named Co-Big Ten Player of the Week, when playing for Michigan State.

An alumni from Michigan State University, Sandy Lewis was a Third-Team All-American center fielder for the Spartans. Throughout her college career she earned Co-Big Ten Player of the Week and Big Ten Player of the Week honors. Sandy Lewis also helped break the 5-year winning streak University of Michigan had over Michigan State in 2003, with a walk-off two-run home run in the bottom of the fifth inning. She ended up in fourth place with her batting average, which was a .400 for the Big Ten Conference. In 2003, Sandy Lewis was also named in the Verizon Academic All-America Softball University Division First Team. Lewis's overall GPA was a 3.63 majoring in Human Biology. As an elite player for the Spartans she led Michigan State on-base percentage (.472), runs batted in (37), runs (39), Batting average (.369) and tying for first in hits (65). She was awarded first-team in the All-Great Lakes Region, first-team All-Big Ten along with the NCAA Region 2 All-Tournament team.
