= Yukiyo Mine =

Japanese softball player

Toyota Red Terriers – No. 1
- Catcher
- Born: 26 January 1988 (age 37); Fukuoka, Japan
- Bats: Right Throws: Right
Medals
Women's softball
Representing Japan
Olympic Games
Gold medal – first place	2008 Beijing	Team
Gold medal – first place	2020 Tokyo	Team
World Cup
Silver medal – second place	2010 Caracas	Team
Gold medal – first place	2012 Whitehorse	Team
Gold medal – first place	2014 Haarlem	Team

Yukiyo Mine (峰 幸代, Mine Yukiyo; born 26 January 1988 in Fukuoka) is a Japanese softball player who plays as a catcher. She won the gold medal at the 2008 Summer Olympics.
