= Danielle Stewart =

Australian softball player

Medal record

Representing Australia

Women's Softball

Olympic Games
Bronze medal – third place	2008 Beijing	Team

Danielle Stewart (born 29 July 1981 in Brisbane, Queensland) is a softball player from Australia, who won a bronze medal at the 2008 Summer Olympics. A short stop, Stewart plays for the Mariners club in Brisbane and has also played college softball in the US at Hofstra University.
