= Justine Smethurst =

Australian softball player

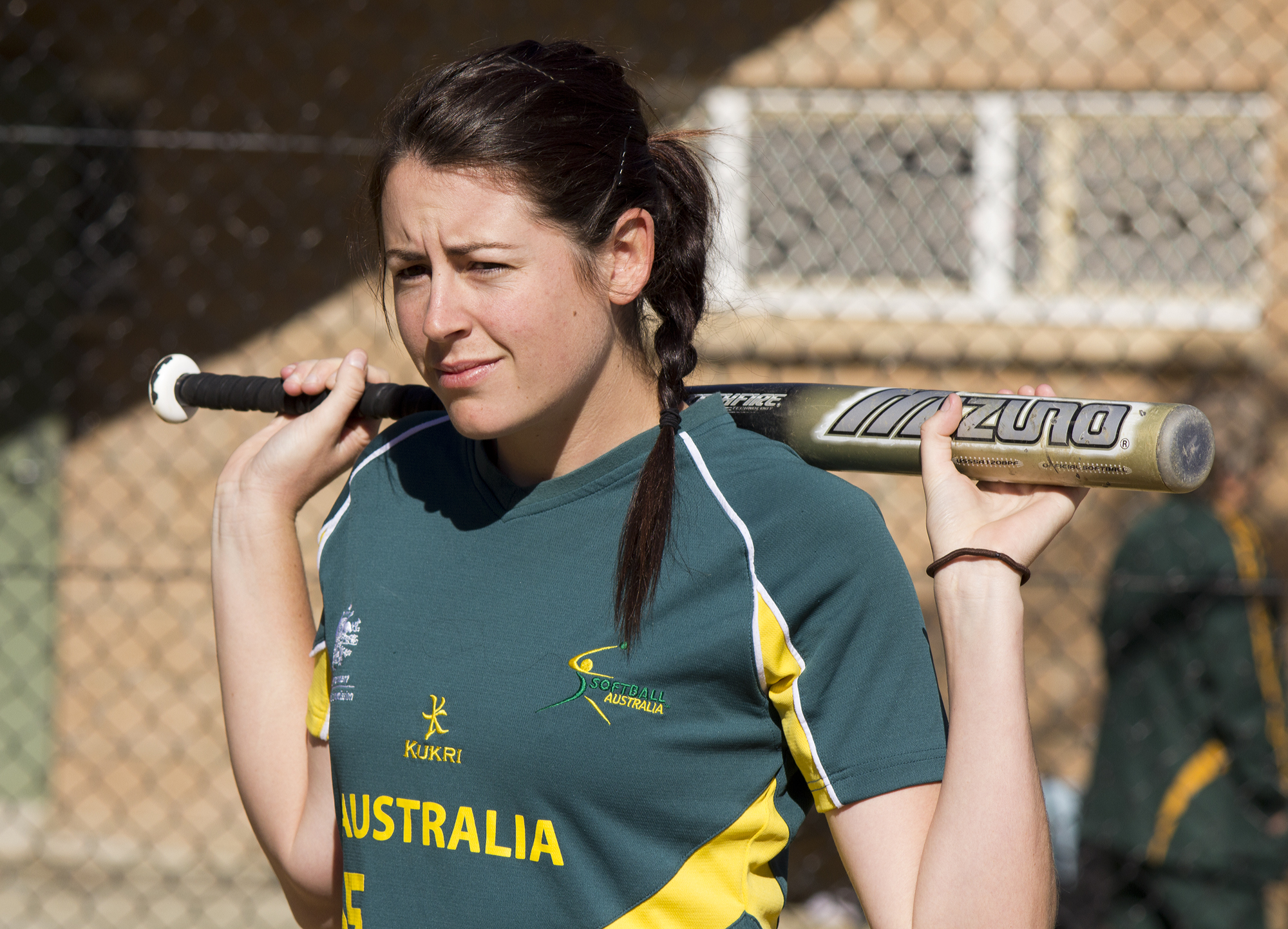
- Smethurst in March 2012 during a photoshoot

Personal information
- Born: January 1987 (age 39) Melbourne, Australia

Sport
- Country: Australia
- Sport: Softball
- Event: Women's team
- Club: Glen Waverley Softball Association

Achievements and titles
- National finals: 2001, 2002, 2005, 2006, 2007, 2008
Medal record
Softball
Representing Australia
Olympic Games
| Bronze medal – third place | 2008 Beijing | Team |

Justine Smethurst (born January 1987 in Melbourne) is an Australian softball player. She is a pitcher and plays club softball in the Glen Waverley Softball Association. She has represented Victoria on a variety of different teams and competed at the national championships several times, winning one in 2001. She played for the University of Hawaiʻi at Mānoa softball team in 2006 and 2007. She has been a member of the senior Australia women's national softball team, winning a bronze medal at the 2008 Summer Olympics. She is trying to gain a spot on the roster to compete at the 2012 ISF XIII Women's World Championships.

== Personal ==
Smethurst was born in January 1987 in Melbourne, Victoria. Her mother and sister both played softball. Both also went on to coach softball. She attended Shelford Anglican Girls' School and graduated in 2004. She learned Japanese in school. One of her hobbies is kayaking. In 2002, she was living in East Brighton, Victoria. She attended the University of Hawaiʻi at Mānoa, enrolling in 2005 and majoring in psychology. While attending the university, she acquired an American accent.

== Softball ==
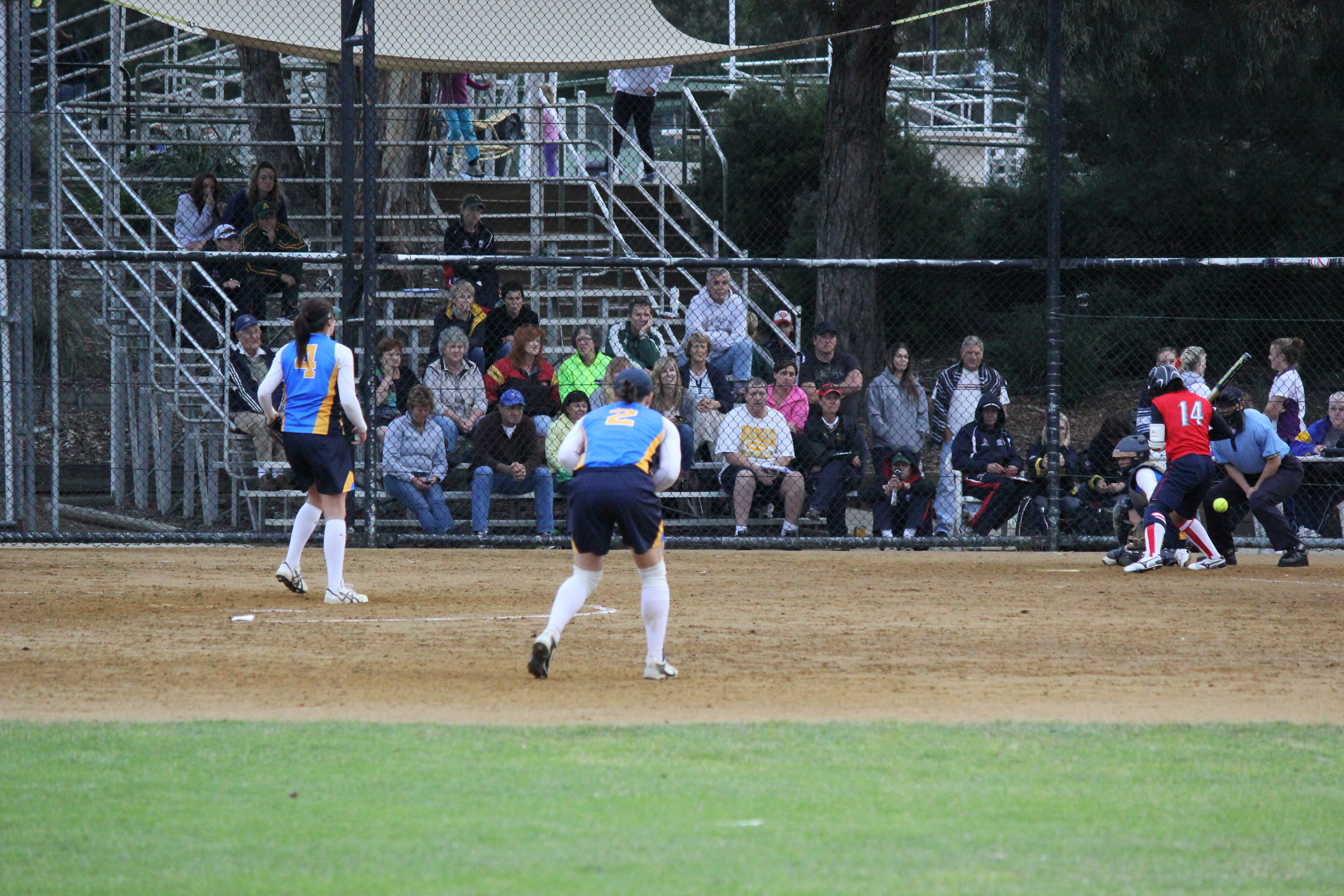
The 19 March 2012 game at Hawker International Softball Centre between the ACT representative side and the Japanese national team. No. 2 is Clare Warwick. No. 4 is Justine Smethurst.

Smethurst is a pitcher. While she started playing before she was twelve, she did not move into the pitching position until she was that age. She plays club softball in the Glen Waverley Softball Association. In 2001, she was a member of the Victorian School Girls' Team. In 2002, as a fifteen-year-old, she was training for softball around fifteen hours a week. In 2005 and 2006, she had a softball scholarship with the Victorian Institute of Sport. In 2008, she had a scholarship with and played for the Australian Institute of Sport team.

=== State team ===
Smethurst has represented Victoria on a variety of different teams. She has represented Victoria as a member of the U13, U14 and U16 teams at the national championships. In 2001 and 2002, as a member of the junior team, she represented Victoria at the national championships. Her team won in 2001. She represented Victoria at the national championships in 2005, 2006, 2007 and 2008, commuting from Hawaii in order to play with the side.

=== University team ===
Smethurst played for the University of Hawaiʻi at Mānoa softball team in 2006 and 2007, before taking a break from the university team in order to try to secure a spot on the national team for the 2008 Summer Olympics. She had a scholarship at the university to play softball.

=== Senior national team ===
Smethurst has been a member of the senior Australia women's national softball team. In 2005, she toured the United States, Canada and Japan with the national team. She did not have an appearance on that national team from late 2005 to mid-2008. University of Hawaiʻi. The 2008 Olympic Games were her first Olympics. She won a bronze medal at the 2008 Summer Olympics. She participated in the Adelaide Olympian parade in 2008. She represented Australia at the 2009 World Cup, where she pitched in the game against Italy that Australia won 8–0. She kept batters hitless until the fifth inning. In 2011, she was a member of the Australian side that competed at the World Cup of Softball. She played in game at the Cup against the United States where Australia lost 5–2. It was her second loss on the day, also having played in a game where Australia lost to Japan. She is a member of the 2012 Australia women's national softball team and is, playing in the 2012 ISF XIII Women's World Championships (1 July 2012).
