= Kelly Hardie =

Australian softball player

Medal record

Representing Australia

Women's Softball

Olympic Games
Bronze medal – third place	2000 Sydney	Team
Bronze medal – third place	2008 Beijing	Team

Kelly Hardie (born 21 November 1969 in Perth, Western Australia) is an Australian softball pitcher who won the bronze medal at the 2000 Summer Olympics.
