= Tracey Mosley =

Australian softball player

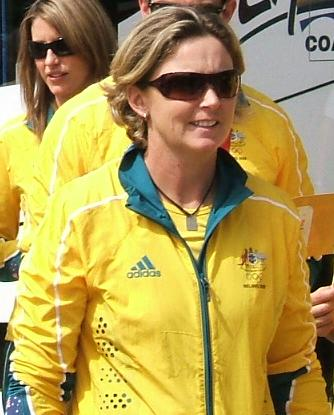

Personal information
- Born: 25 September 1973 (age 53) Sydney, Australia

Sport
- Sport: Softball
Medal record
Representing Australia
Women's Softball
Olympic Games
Silver medal – second place	2004 Athens	Team
Bronze medal – third place	2008 Beijing	Team

Tracey Mosley (born 25 September 1973 in Sydney, Australia) is a softball player from Australia, who won a silver medal at the 2004 Summer Olympics and a bronze medal at the 2008 Summer Olympics.
