= Hiroko Sakai =

Japanese softball player

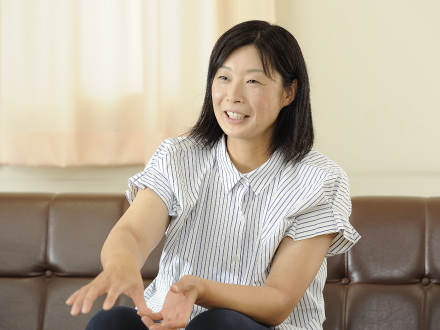
- Hiroko Sakai at aff interview in 2019

Medal record

Women's softball

Representing Japan

Olympic Games
Gold medal – first place	2008 Beijing	Team competition
Bronze medal – third place	2004 Athens	Team competition

Hiroko Sakai (坂井 寛子, Sakai Hiroko; born 3 November 1978 in Fukui) is a Japanese softball player who won the gold medal at the 2008 Summer Olympics.

She is 177 cm (5-9.5) tall and weighs 73 kg (161 lbs).
