= Yuki Sato (softball) =

Japanese softball player (born 1980)

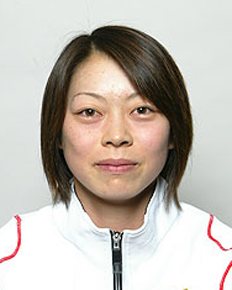
- Yuki Sato

Medal record

Women's softball

Representing Japan

Olympic Games
Bronze medal – third place	2004 Athens	Team competition

Yuki Sato (佐藤 由希, Satō Yuki; born 3 November 1980 in Shizuoka, Japan) is a Japanese softball player who won a bronze medal in the 2004 Summer Olympics.
