= Natalie Hodgskin =

Australian softball player

Medal record

Representing Australia

Women's Softball

Olympic Games
Silver medal – second place	2004 Athens	Team

Natalie Hodgskin (born 24 May 1976) is a softball player from Australia, who won a silver medal at the 2004 Summer Olympics.
