= Tanya Harding =

Australian softball player

Medal record

Women's Softball

Representing Australia

Olympic Games
Bronze medal – third place	1996 Atlanta	Team
Bronze medal – third place	2000 Sydney	Team
Silver medal – second place	2004 Athens	Team
Bronze medal – third place	2008 Beijing	Team

Tanya Victoria Harding (born 23 January 1972 in Brisbane, Queensland) is an Australian softball player. She competed for Australia for four consecutive Summer Olympics, starting in 1996. Three times she claimed a bronze medal (1996, 2000, 2008), and once a silver medal (2004).

== Playing career ==
The Queenslander was ranked in the top five pitchers in the world for over a decade.

In 1995, Harding enrolled at UCLA for one quarter. She played on the squad that won the NCAA women's softball championships, and was named MVP of the tournament. After UCLA captured the NCAA National Championship, Harding returned to her homeland without taking final exams or earning a single college credit.

However, in 1997 UCLA was stripped of its 1995 title for scholarship violations. Three softball players had been granted soccer scholarships, putting the Bruins three over the limit for softball. Although the three players involved were not identified, it was believed that one of them was Harding. Runner-up Arizona was not declared the champion, as there was no way to determine if Arizona would have won had Harding not been involved. Officially, there is no champion for 1995.

In 2022, she was inducted into Sport Australia Hall of Fame.
