= Brooke Wilkins =

Australian softball player

Medal record

Representing Australia

Women's Softball

Olympic Games
Bronze medal – third place	1996 Sydney	Team
Bronze medal – third place	2000 Sydney	Team
Silver medal – second place	2004 Athens	Team

Brooke Wilkins-Penfold (born 6 June 1974) is an Australian, former collegiate All-American, retired three-time Olympic Games medalist, left-handed softball pitcher, originally from Sydney. Wilkins played two years from 1994 to 1995 for the Hawaii Rainbow Wahine in the Big West Conference, ranking in career pitching records for both. She later who won a bronze medal at the 1996 Summer Olympics and 2000 Summer Olympics and a silver medal at the 2004 Summer Olympics for Team Australia as a starting pitcher for the national team.

Wilkins attended the University of Hawaii in 1994 and 1995, but did not return to the school after winning bronze in Atlanta.

== Career statistics ==
YEAR	W	L	GP	GS	CG	SHO	SV	IP	H	R	ER	BB	SO	ERA	WHIP
1994	29	8	38	36	34	18	0	275.2	117	30	24	47	324	0.61	0.59
1995	29	8	39	32	29	14	0	257.2	124	48	28	49	261	0.76	0.67
TOTALS	58	16	77	68	63	32	0	533.1	241	78	52	96	585	0.68	0.63
