= Natalie Ward (softball) =

Australian softball player

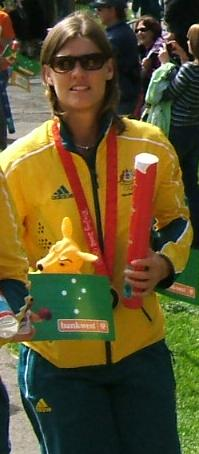
- Ward in 2008

Personal information
- Born: 24 December 1975 (age 50) Newcastle, New South Wales
- Height: 168 cm (5 ft 6 in)
- Weight: 64 kg (141 lb)

Sport
- Club: Lake Macquarie Association
- Coached by: Troy Baverstock & Fabian Barlow
Medal record
Women's Softball
Representing Australia
Olympic Games
Silver medal – second place	2004 Athens	Team
Bronze medal – third place	1996 Atlanta	Team
Bronze medal – third place	2000 Sydney	Team
Bronze medal – third place	2008 Beijing	Team
- Updated on 4 October 2015

Natalie Anne Ward (born 24 December 1975) is a former softball player from Australia, who won bronze medals at the 1996 Summer Olympics, the 2000 Summer Olympics and the 2008 Summer Olympics. Ward also won a silver medal at the 2004 Summer Olympics. She played shortstop and 2nd base. She wore jersey number six.

Ward was born in Newcastle, New South Wales. By 2006, she had appeared in 357 games for the Australian national team. That broke the former record of 356 games held by Sally McCreedy. Ward played in the 2008 Olympic Games, her fourth Olympics. Ward retired from the sport following these Olympics because of the IOC's decision to not allow softball into the next two Olympiads. In 2026, she was inducted into the Sport Australia Hall of Fame as an athlete member.
