= Emi Inui =

Japanese softball player

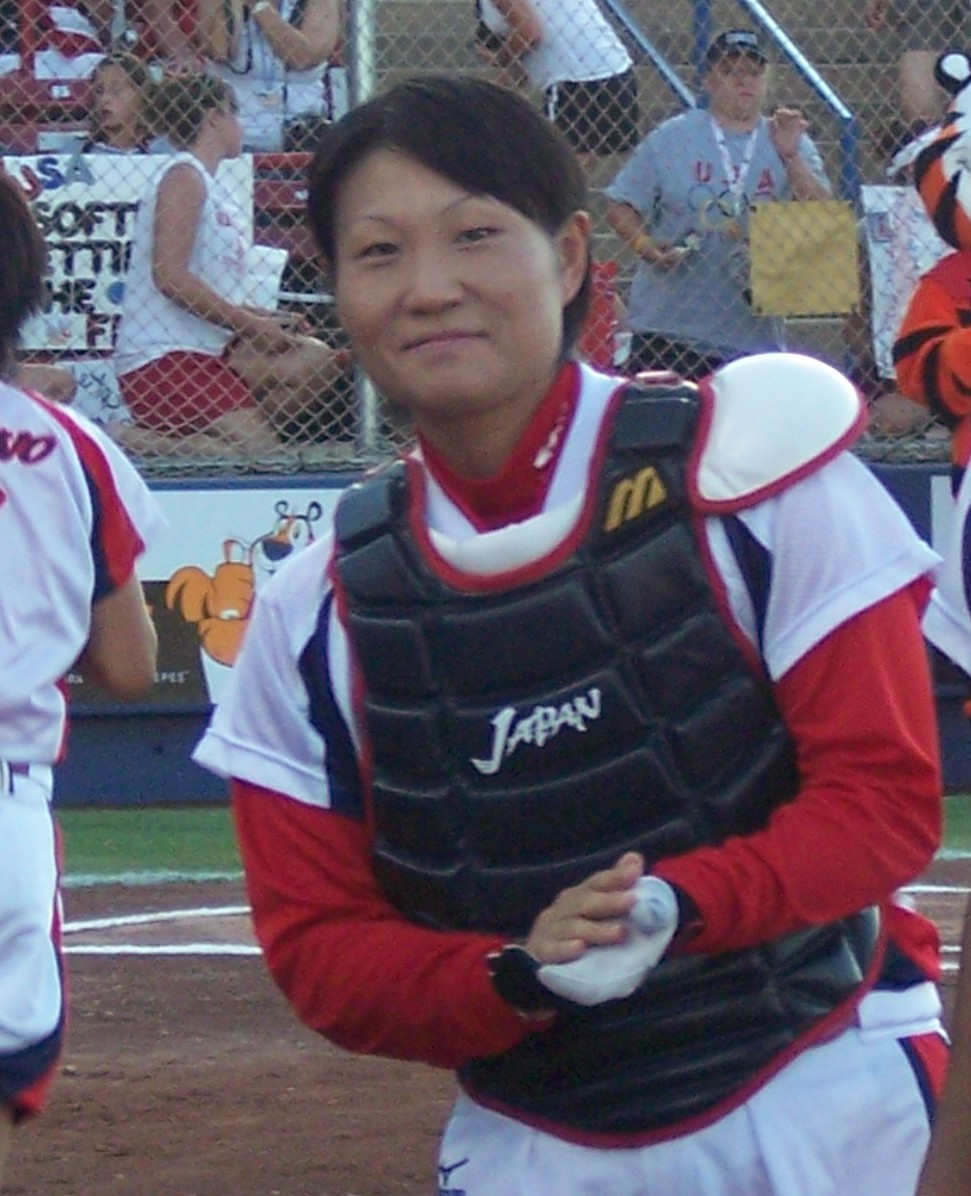

Medal record

Women's softball

Representing Japan

Olympic Games
Gold medal – first place	2008 Beijing	Team competition
Bronze medal – third place	2004 Athens	Team competition

Emi Inui (乾 絵美, Inui Emi; born 26 October 1983) is a Japanese softball player who won the gold medal at the 2008 Summer Olympics.
