= Lori Harrigan =

American softball player

Personal information
- Born: September 5, 1970 (age 55) Anaheim, California, U.S.
Medal record
Women's softball
Representing the United States
Olympic Games
Gold medal – first place	1996 Atlanta	Team competition
Gold medal – first place	2000 Sydney	Team competition
Gold medal – first place	2004 Athens	Team competition

Lori Harrigan-Mack (born September 5, 1970) is an American, former collegiate All-American, right-handed hitting, left-handed softball pitcher originally from Anaheim, California. She was a three-time Olympic Champion as a member of the Team USA winning in 1996, 2000 and 2004. Harrigan played collegiately from 1989–1992 at the University of Nevada, Las Vegas where she owns numerous records; she is the Big West Conference career leader in shutouts and innings pitched and is a USA Softball Hall of Fame honoree.

== Career ==
=== University of Nevada, Las Vegas ===
Harrigan kicked off her career being named a 1989 Second Team All-Big West honoree. She broke school season records in ERA, strikeouts and shutouts, all remain top-10 all-time. For her sophomore year, she earned identical conference accolades and broke her own ERA record while also setting new marks in wins (1990 NCAA top-10) and shutouts, both career highs, the latter of which remains the best for a Rebel season. Along with the second most innings pitched record (top-10 in the conference all-time), Harrigan also twirled her first no-hitter vs. the Utah Utes on March 16, 1990. The Rebels would make the 1990 Women's College World Series and Harrigan would toss all three games, including a win over the Kent State Golden Flashes before being eliminated by the FSU Seminoles on May 26.

As a junior, Harrigan earned a NFCA Third Team All-American citation to go along with a First Team All-Big West award. She would better her own ERA record and post a school and career best in strikeouts. Her wins (1991 NCAA top-10), shutouts and innings pitched are top-5 for a school season, the innings remains a conference top-10 mark. Harrigan would also toss two no-hitters that year. Her second and last appearance at the WCWS included a 13-inning loss to eventual champs the Arizona Wildcats on May 23.

For a final time Harrigan was named First Team for the conference and Third Team All-American. With career best strikeout ratio (5.7) as well as school season record WHIP, ERA and top-10 shutouts and strikeouts school marks, she also pitched three no-hitters and a perfect game. The lone school perfect performance on March 24, 1992 vs. the Missouri Tigers was an 8-inning win for Harrigan. Her ERA was ranked 10th for that NCAA year. For one of her no-hitters on February 14, she would set the school single game strikeouts record, fanning 15 of the Southern Utah Thunderbirds in regulation.

The Rebel would end her career leading in wins, ERA, strikeouts, shutouts and innings pitched and continues to hold the crown for all. Harrigan is tops in the Big West for shutouts and innings pitched and top-5 in wins, strikeouts and ERA all-time.

On February 26, 1998, Harrigan's jersey number was ceremonially retired. She was later inducted into the UNLV Rebels Hall of Fame.

== Post-softball ==
Harrigan is the director of security at the Mandarin Oriental, Las Vegas.

=== The Biggest Loser: Glory Days ===
Harrigan was a contestant on the 16th season of the reality competition The Biggest Loser, titled The Biggest Loser: Glory Days, which premiered on September 11, 2014, on NBC. She began the show weighing 301 pounds and was 210 pounds on the day of the finale, for a total weight loss of 91 pounds.

== Personal life ==
Harrigan is married to Andrew Mack and has a son, Shawn.

== Career statistics ==
=== UNLV Rebels ===
YEAR	W	L	GP	GS	CG	SHO	SV	IP	H	R	ER	BB	SO	ERA	WHIP
1989	18	16	43	33	29	11	3	261.1	196	69	43	48	198	1.15	0.93
1990	25	17	48	40	36	17	1	291.2	182	55	33	37	144	0.79	0.75
1991	24	11	38	35	35	14	0	287.2	167	48	24	42	223	0.58	0.73
1992	16	9	32	25	23	11	3	194.0	113	22	14	13	160	0.50	0.65
TOTALS	83	53	161	133	123	53	7	1034.2	658	194	114	140	725	0.77	0.77

=== Team USA Olympic Games ===
YEAR	W	L	GP	GS	CG	SHO	SV	IP	H	R	ER	BB	SO	ERA	WHIP
1996	1	0	1	1	1	1	0	7.0	2	0	0	0	5	0.00	0.28
2000	2	0	2	1	1	1	0	12.1	1	0	0	1	13	0.00	0.16
2004	1	0	3	1	1	1	0	10.2	6	0	0	1	11	0.00	0.68
TOTALS	4	0	6	3	3	3	0	30.0	9	0	0	2	29	0.00	0.36
