= Rie Sato (softball) =

Japanese softball player

Medal record

Women's softball

Representing Japan

Olympic Games
Gold medal – first place	2008 Beijing	Team competition
Bronze medal – third place	2004 Athens	Team competition

Rie Sato (佐藤 理恵, Satō Rie) (born 14 August 1980) is a Japanese softball player who won the gold medal at the 2008 Summer Olympics.
