= Fiona Crawford =

Australian softball player

Medal record

Representing Australia

Women's Softball

Olympic Games
| Bronze medal – third place | 2000 Sydney | Team |
| Silver medal – second place | 2004 Athens | Team |

Fiona Crawford (born 21 February 1977 in Sydney) is a softball player from Australia, who won a bronze medal at the 2000 Summer Olympics and a silver medal at the 2004 Summer Olympics. Crawford, then Fiona Hanes, completed her schooling at Gilroy College, Castle Hill.

In addition to training with the national team, Crawford works as a human resources manager. In 2004, she received a 2004 Australian Institute of Sport Vocational Achievement Award. In 2005, she received an award for Human Resources Manager of the Year from the Australian Hotels Association. Fiona is also commentating on the Olympic Softball Program in the 2020 Summer Olympics.
