= Kylie Cronk =

Australian softball player

Medal record

Representing Australia

Women's Softball

Olympic Games
Bronze medal – third place	2008 Beijing	Team

Kylie Cronk (born 27 March 1984 in Toowoomba, Queensland) is a softball player from Australia, who won a bronze medal at the 2008 Summer Olympics. Cronk currently lives in Rockhampton, Queensland and works for the Queensland Government.
