= Masumi Mishina =

Japanese softball player (born 1982)

Medal record

Women's softball

Representing Japan

Olympic Games
| Gold medal – first place | 2008 Beijing | Team competition |
| Bronze medal – third place | 2004 Athens | Team competition |

Masumi Mishina (三科 真澄, Mishina Masumi) (born 12 March 1982 in Kanagawa) is a Japanese softball player who won the gold medal at the 2008 Summer Olympics.
