= Belinda Wright (softball) =

Australian softball player

Personal information
- Born: 16 September 1980 (age 45) Newcastle, New South Wales
- Height: 170 cm (5 ft 7 in)
- Weight: 63 kg (139 lb)
Medal record
Representing Australia
Women's Softball
Olympic Games
Bronze medal – third place	2008 Beijing	Team
- Updated on 4 October 2015

Belinda Wright (born 16 September 1980) is a softball player from Australia. She won a bronze medal at the 2008 Summer Olympics.

Wright, who was born in Cessnock, New South Wales, won bronze at the 2006 world championships, and was named MVP for the 3rd round of the 2007 national league.
