= Lovieanne Jung =

Personal information
- Born: January 11, 1980 (age 46) Honolulu, Hawaii, U.S.
- Height: 5 ft 6 in (168 cm)

Sport
- College team: Arizona Wildcats
- Partner: Jon Garland
Medal record
Women's softball
Representing the United States
Olympic Games
Gold medal – first place	2004 Athens	Team competition
Silver medal – second place	2008 Beijing	Team competition
World Championships
Gold medal – first place	2006 Beijing	Team competition
Gold medal – first place	2002 Saskatoon	Team competition
Pan American Games
Gold medal – first place	2007 Rio	Team competition
Gold medal – first place	2003 Sto Domingo	Team competition

Lovieanne Leimomi Jung (born January 11, 1980) is an American, former collegiate All-American, two-time medal winning Olympian, retired softball player. She began her college softball career at Fresno State as a second baseman, then transferred to Arizona and played as a shortstop. She represented the United States women's national softball team winning a gold medal at the 2004 Summer Olympics, and a silver medal at the 2008 Summer Olympics.

== College ==
Beginning her NCAA collegiate career at Fresno State University, Jung had her debut on February 15, 1999, vs. the UCSB Gauchos, swatting a home run in her first at-bat. She was named a National Fastpitch Coaches Association Second Team All-American and recognized Second Team All-WAC Conference. The Bulldogs returned to defend their Women's College World Series championship title and she led the team with a .500 average and was named All-Tournament after the team was eliminated on May 29 by the California Golden Bears. As a sophomore, she repeated honors from both the NFCA and moving to the First Team for the conference. She would leave ranking top-10 in career batting average (.359) for the Bulldogs.

Jung transferred to the University of Arizona. She began in 2002 by being named Pac-10 Newcomer of the Year, unique as a third-year player. She also earned First Team conference honors. Jung once again led her team in average at the World Series and helped them to the finale game on May 27. She walked all three of her plate appearances in a loss to the California Golden Bears. For a final year, she captured her last NFCA (First Team) and conference awards, led the Nation in home runs, RBIs, total bases and slugging percentage to be named a top-3 finalist for USA Softball Player of The Year. Jung belted a two-run homer on May 18 to help defeat the Texas A&M Aggies in the NCAA Tournament Regionals, driving in her 200th career RBI. She played her last game on May 25 in another loss to Cal at the WCWS, recording a hit. She earned her second WCWS All-Tournament mark and again led the team in average. For a second time, Jung would rank top-10 in career average (.409) as well as slugging (.838%, which also is a Pac-10 top-5 record), at the school upon her graduation. In all of the NCAA, Jung was ranked 8th and now is still in the top-25 overall for career total bases.

As a standout player, appearing in three Women's College World Series, Jung's WCWS stats included batting .375 (12/32) with two RBIs, a double, and seven base on balls.

== Personal ==
Born in Honolulu, Hawaii, Jung moved with her family to California at a young age. She is of Filipino, Spanish, Hawaiian, Chinese and Lithuanian descent.

She won a gold medal at the 2004 Olympics and a silver medal at the 2008 Olympics before retiring from softball. Lovieanne Jung is currently working as a Firefighter/Paramedic for The City of Riverside Fire Department.

Jung's husband is Jon Garland who she has two kids with. She currently works as a firefighter.

== Statistics ==
Fresno State Bulldogs & Arizona Wildcats
YEAR	G	AB	R	H	BA	RBI	HR	3B	2B	TB	SLG	BB	SO	SB	SBA
1999	75	233	41	77	.330	50	6	6	12	119	.510%	19	19	11	12
2000	67	207	41	81	.391	34	1	4	14	106	.512%	15	19	7	7
2002	67	206	64	75	.364	40	16	2	13	140	.679%	44	28	9	10
2003	63	178	70	82	.460	79	25	2	21	182	1.022%	55	18	9	11
TOTALS	272	824	216	315	.382	203	48	14	60	547	.664%	133	84	36	40

Team USA
YEAR	G	AB	R	H	BA	RBI	HR	3B	2B	TB	SLG	BB	SO	SB	SBA
2004	9	20	5	6	.300	3	0	0	2	8	.400%	5	4	2	2
2008	9	21	3	7	.333	5	0	0	0	7	.333%	2	4	0	0
TOTALS	18	41	8	13	.317	8	0	0	2	15	.366%	7	8	2	2
