= Crystl Bustos =

American softball player

Personal information
- Full name: Crystl Irene Bustos
- Nickname: The Big Bruiser
- Born: September 8, 1977 (age 48) Canyon Country, California, U.S.
- Height: 5 ft 8 in (1.73 m)

Sport
- College team: Palm Beach Panthers
Medal record
Women's softball
Representing the United States
Olympic Games
Gold medal – first place	2000 Sydney	Team competition
Gold medal – first place	2004 Athens	Team competition
Silver medal – second place	2008 Beijing	Team competition
World Championship
Gold medal – first place	2006 Beijing	Team competition
Pan American Games
Gold medal – first place	1999 Winnipeg	Team competition
Gold medal – first place	2003 Santo Domingo	Team competition
Gold medal – first place	2007 Rio de Janeiro	Team competition
World Cup
1st	2006 Oklahoma City	Team competition
1st	2007 Oklahoma City	Team competition
National Pro Fastpitch
1st	2005 season	Akron Racers

Crystl Irene Bustos (born September 8, 1977), also known as The Big Bruiser, is an American softball player at the designated hitter or third base position although on the roster she is a designated player. She is a two-time Olympic gold medalist. She holds the world record for home runs during an Olympic series, with six.

== Career ==
Bustos, a Mexican American, was born in Canyon Country, California (currently a part of Santa Clarita). She began her career playing softball at Canyon Country Little League and attended Palm Beach Community College. She is a member of the 2008 U.S. Olympic softball team, which won the silver medal after losing to Japan in the gold-medal game, the first loss for the U.S. women in 23 straight Olympic games. Her accomplishments also include two World Cup Championships (2006 and 2007), three Pan American gold medals (1999, 2003 and 2007), and a gold medal at the 2006 ISF World Championships. She has also played for the NPF Akron Racers, and was the Most Valuable Player in the WPSL for the Orlando Wahoos in 1998.

Bustos announced that she would retire from international competition after the 2008 Beijing Olympics.

Bustos was named 2008 USA Softball Player of the Year. She became the field manager for the Akron Racers in October 2009, but elected to return to the playing field for the Racers in 2010.

== Statistics ==
Team USA
YEAR	G	AB	R	H	BA	RBI	HR	3B	2B	TB	SLG	BB	SO	SB	SBA
2000	10	37	5	10	.270	4	2	0	1	17	.459%	4	8	1	1
2004	9	26	9	9	.346	10	5	0	0	24	.923%	2	4	0	0
2008	9	22	12	11	.500	10	6	0	0	29	1.318%	6	1	0	0
TOTALS	28	85	26	30	.353	24	13	0	1	70	.823%	12	13	1	1
