= Yumi Iwabuchi =

Japanese softball player (born 1979)

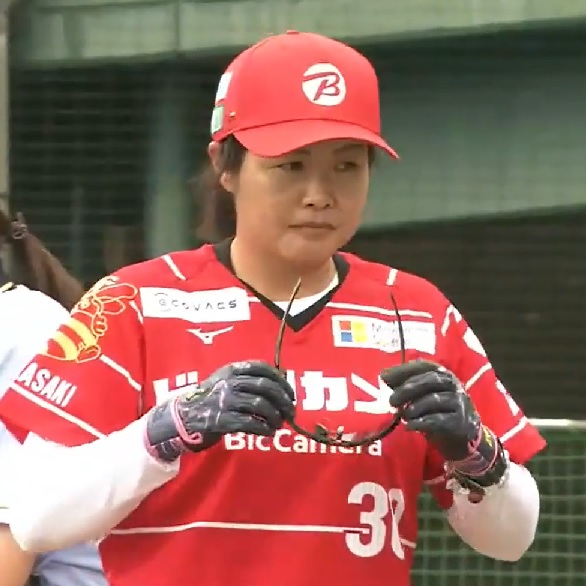

Medal record

Women's softball

Representing Japan

Olympic Games
Bronze medal – third place	2004 Athens	Team competition

Yumi Iwabuchi (岩渕 有美, Iwabuchi Yumi; born September 10, 1979 in Saitama, Japan) is a Japanese softball player who won a bronze medal in the 2004 Summer Olympics.
