= Softball at the Summer Olympics =

- IOC Code: BSB (baseball/softball); SOF, SBL (softball only)
- Governing body: WBSC
- Events: 1 (women)

Summer Olympics
- 1896; 1900; 1904; 1908; 1912; 1920; 1924; 1928; 1932; 1936; 1948; 1952; 1956; 1960; 1964; 1968; 1972; 1976; 1980; 1984; 1988; 1992; 1996; 2000; 2004; 2008; 2012; 2016; 2020; 2024; 2028; 2032
- Medalists

Softball was on the Olympic program from 1996 to 2008. It was introduced at the 1996 Atlanta Olympics and was removed from the program for 2012 and 2016, but was added for a one-off appearance, along with baseball, for the 2020 Summer Olympics (which was postponed to 2021 due to the COVID-19 pandemic).

Olympic softball is governed by the World Baseball Softball Confederation (WBSC).

== Softball, the Olympic program and Olympic recognition ==
=== Early attempts for Olympic inclusion ===
During the 1940s, Americans and Japanese were making the first overtures to get softball included on the Olympic program. This effort was led by the American softball association and Jiro Iwano, Vice President of the Japanese Olympic Committee and President of the Japanese Softball Association.

There were efforts to get softball on the Olympic program during the 1950s. In 1950, the Softball Association of America sent letters to national organisations asking for assistance in getting the newly created International Softball Federation to include softball on the Olympic program. Australia received such a letter and responded by asking for additional information. Irene Burrows, the Australian association secretary, was extremely keen to support this and took active steps to try to work on this goal. The Australian Softball Council made an effort in 1952 to get the sport included on the program and thought they had a decent opportunity at doing just that because the sport had a great deal of popularity, being played in over 15 countries. This effort was mirrored by the Americans with the support of other countries such as New Zealand. Efforts to improve the chances of getting softball on the 1956 program included having New Zealand's national softball body affiliating with the American one.

These efforts continued into the 1960s, with the International Softball Federation working consistently towards inclusion. They were told in 1965 a requirement of playing the sport at the Olympics as the sport must be played in at least eleven countries who can field teams to compete at the Games and the international governing body for the sport must have at least twenty-nine national federations affiliated with it. At the time, softball only had fifteen national bodies affiliated with it.

Despite being eligible for inclusion on the program by 1969, it was not because Olympic organisers determined the sport, alongside roller skating and water skiing was "too big and too expensive." Efforts continued to get softball on the Olympic program during the 1970s, with the hope of the 1984 Summer Olympics being held in the United States meaning softball could at least be a demonstration sport. This did not materialise. The Barcelona Olympic Organising Committee decided to make softball and golf demonstration sports at the 1992 Summer Olympics but the IOC stepped in in 1990 because they felt its inclusion would be an "undue burden" on the organisers. The 1992 Summer Olympics frustrated softball organisers because baseball was to be a medal sport at the Games as a men's only event.

=== Inclusion on the Olympic program ===
At the highest level they are moving away from the ideals of Olympicism. We've been a casualty of that. I'm not against golf or any other sport being at the Olympics. I think there should be a place for everyone. I just thought we'd been loyal to the Olympic movement and they should have been loyal to us.

— Melanie Roche, four time Olympic medalist in softball

Softball was introduced as an Olympic sport for women only in the 1996 Atlanta Olympics. The decision to add the sport to the 1996 Olympic program was made in 1995. The IOC earlier had established a committee the prototype of their International Olympic Commission on Women and Sports. Anita DeFrantz as committee chair starting 1992 would be instrumental in helping get softball on the Olympic program.

=== Expulsion from the Olympic program ===
It is a little bit funny seeing London splashed across the TV at the moment for us and I think a lot of the girls are only now just starting to realise that we aren't in the Olympics. It will be really different [to be away from the hype of an Olympics] but it is probably a good thing that we are focused on our world championships and not having to watch the opening ceremony and all those fun things.

— Stacey Porter, Australian softball player

On 11 July 2005, the IOC voted to drop baseball and softball from the Olympic program for 2012, a decision that was reaffirmed on 9 February 2006. The vote to keep softball on the program required a simple majority of the 105 eligible voters, but the vote ended up as 52–52 with one abstention. It was officially decided in August 2009 at IOC Board meeting in Berlin that it would not be included in the 2016 Summer Olympics. This was the first time in 69 years that sports--softball and polo--had been removed from the Olympic program. The selection of which sports to include on the London Program was done via secret ballot.

The decision to remove softball from the Olympics in advance of the Beijing Games created a sense of urgency for some development players to make their senior national teams by 2008 as they would not otherwise have a chance to compete at the Olympics.

The removal of softball from the Olympics has had an adverse impact on the game: Australia's government gave less funding to the sport as a result of the decision. This means players had to reduce their international travel for competition at the highest levels.

The IOC decision to include two other sports, golf and rugby sevens, on the Olympic program was perceived by the softball community as a likely end of their ability to get back onto the Olympic program. On 1 April 2011, the International Softball Federation and International Baseball Federation announced they were preparing a joint proposal to revive play of both sports at the 2020 Summer Olympics.

=== Re-inclusion on the Olympic program ===
On August 3, 2016, the IOC voted to include baseball and softball in the 2020 Summer Olympics, along with karate, sport climbing, surfing and skateboarding. Softball was not be included in the 2024 Paris Olympics, but it is expected that the sport will be included, along with baseball, in the 2028 Los Angeles Olympics due to both sports' huge popularity in the United States.

== Rules ==
Women's softball was the female version of baseball played at the Games since women's baseball was not included on the program. Rule differences between Olympic softball and baseball included: 1) ball is pitched underhand. The ball must weigh between 6.25 ounces (177 g) and 7 ounces (200 g). The pitcher's mound is the same height as the rest of the playing surface, with the infield being covered in dirt instead of grass. The distance of the outfield fence is measured from home plate at 200 feet (61 m) and the distance between bases is 60 feet (18 m) instead of the 90 feet (27 m) of Olympic baseball. Games at the Olympics have seven innings compared to baseball's nine innings.

== Format ==
Between 1996 to 2008, eight teams competed being chosen to compete at the Olympics based on the following criteria: One team was the host nation. Four teams were chosen because they were the semifinalists at the most recent ISF Women's World Championship. The three remaining nations were chosen based on regional qualification tournaments. The preliminary round of competition was formatted as a round robin competition, with the top four point earning teams advancing to the semifinals. During this stage, the semifinal team with the best record automatically advanced to the finals. "The other semifinal winner plays the team that lost to the superior seminal winner. The winner of this game goes to the final."

== At the Games ==
=== 1996 Summer Olympics ===
The softball games were held in Columbus, Georgia (approximately 100 miles from the main Olympic Games site of Atlanta, Georgia). Countries competing at the 1996 Summer Olympics included the United States, China, Australia, Japan, Canada, Taiwan, the Netherlands and Puerto Rico. This was the first time softball was on the Olympic program. The United States finished first, China second and Australia third.

=== 2000 Summer Olympics ===
The Games were held in Sydney, Australia. Countries competing at the 2000 Summer Olympics included the United States, Japan, Australia, China, Italy, New Zealand, Cuba and Canada. The United States won the gold medal for the second time, with Japan winning silver and Australia winning their second bronze medal.

=== 2004 Summer Olympics ===
The Games were held in Athens, Greece. Countries competing at the 2004 Summer Olympics included the United States, Australia, Japan, China, Canada,Chinese Taipei, Greece and Italy.

Only one hitter at the 2004 game was able to score a run off the American team's pitchers. That hitter was Stacey Porter of Australia.

The United States (USA) won their third consecutive gold while Australia (AUS) took silver and Japan (JPN), the bronze. These were the same three medalists as 2000, though AUS and JPN flipped their positions.

=== 2008 Summer Olympics ===
The 2006 edition of the ISF Women's World Championship was very important as the Championships were used for Olympic qualifying, with the top four finishers going to the Olympic Games. In 2006, the fourth-place finishers automatically qualified to the Games because China was the Olympic Games based on that. Thus, there was a battle for fifth place between Canada and Italy for Olympic qualifications. In the match for fifth, Canada won 3–0 and earned their fourth consecutive trip to the Olympics.

The medalists were the same three nations (in different orders) for the third consecutive Olympics; Japan won the 2008 Summer Olympics softball gold medal, with the United States taking home silver and Australia the bronze.

=== 2020 Summer Olympics ===
On August 12, 2018, the first team to qualify for the 2020 Olympics was the United States, by winning the 2018 World Championship. Japan automatically qualifies by being the host country, as well as the 2018 World Championship runners-up.

At the Olympics, Japan won the gold, the United States won the silver, and Canada won the bronze.

=== 2024 Summer Olympics ===
The organizing committee of the 2024 Paris Olympics has announced that softball will be omitted from these games' program.

=== 2028 Summer Olympics ===
The International Olympic Committee announced on October 16, 2023 that it has accepted a proposal by local organizers of the 2028 Summer Olympics in Los Angeles to add baseball/softball, cricket, flag football, lacrosse and squash to the event's sports program.

== Records ==
The first solo no-hitter to be pitched at the Olympics was done by the American pitcher Lori Harrigan in a game against Canada at the 2000 Summer Olympics.

The first side to beat the host country in softball was Australia at the 1996 Summer Olympics. The USA team lost this game primarily because of a base running error in which a home run was hit but the runner failed to touch home plate during the celebration at the plate, resulting in the run not scoring and an out being called. Australia won this game by one run. However, the USA team rebounded to win the overall tournament and the gold.

The United States had a 22-game winning streak at the Olympics between 2000 and 2008, only ending their winning steak in the gold medal match against Japan.

== Medal table ==
At the inaugural appearance of the event on the Olympic program, the United States took gold and losing one game on the way there. They beat other medal favourites Australia and China. The United States repeated their victory at the 2000 Games when they beat Japan 3–1 in the gold medal game and again in 2004. Japan won the tournament in 2008 and defended their gold medal in 2020.

Rank	Nation	Gold	Silver	Bronze	Total
1	United States	3	2	0	5
2	Japan	2	1	1	4
3	Australia	0	1	3	4
4	China	0	1	0	1
5	Canada	0	0	1	1
Totals (5 entries)		5	5	5	15

== Results ==
Edition	Year	Official host	Champions	Score and venue	Runners-up	Third place	Score and venue	Fourth place	No. of teams
1	1996	United States	United States	3–1; Golden Park, Columbus, Georgia	China	Australia	3–0; Golden Park, Columbus, Georgia	Japan	8
2	2000	Australia	United States	2–1 (F/8); Blacktown International Sportspark, Sydney	Japan	Australia	1–0; Blacktown International Sportspark, Sydney	China	8
3	2004	Greece	United States	5–1; Hellinikon Olympic Complex, Athens	Australia	Japan	1–0; Hellinikon Olympic Complex, Athens	China	8
4	2008	China	Japan	3–1; Fengtai Softball Field, Beijing	United States	Australia	5–3; Fengtai Softball Field, Beijing	Canada	8
5	2020	Japan	Japan	2–0; Yokohama Stadium, Yokohama	United States	Canada	3–2; Yokohama Stadium, Yokohama	Mexico	6
6	2028	United States							

== Participating nations ==
Nation	1996	2000	2004	2008	2020	2028	Years
Australia	3	3	2	3	5		5
Canada	5	8	5	4	3		5
China	2	4	4	5	–		4
Chinese Taipei	6	–	6	6	–		3
Cuba	–	7	–	–	–		1
Greece	–	–	7	–	–		1
Italy	–	5	8	–	6		3
Japan	4	2	3	1	1		5
Mexico	–	–	–	–	4		1
Netherlands	7	–	–	8	–		2
New Zealand	–	6	–	–	–		1
Puerto Rico	8	–	–	–	–		1
United States	1	1	1	2	2	Q	6
Venezuela	–	–	–	7	–		1
Total Nations	8	8	8	8	6	6	

== See also ==
- Baseball at the Summer Olympics
- List of Olympic venues in discontinued events
