= Melanie Roche =

Australian softball player

Personal information
- Born: 9 November 1970 (age 55)
Medal record
Women's Softball
Representing Australia
Olympic Games
Bronze medal – third place	1996 Atlanta	Team
Bronze medal – third place	2000 Sydney	Team
Silver medal – second place	2004 Athens	Team
Bronze medal – third place	2008 Beijing	Team

Melanie Jane Roche (born 9 November 1970 in Bankstown, New South Wales) is a softball player from Australia. She has won a bronze medal at the 1996 Summer Olympics and 2000 Summer Olympics, a silver medal at the 2004 Summer Olympics along with a bronze medal in the 2008 Beijing Olympics. Participating in 4 Olympic Games and winning 4 Olympic Medals is an Australian Olympic Record. Roche was a two-time First Team All-American at Oklahoma State University, where she played from 1990 to 1993. While in college, Roche tallied 774 strikeouts in 658-2/3 innings, a ratio that is tied for 28th all-time. She was inducted into the OSU Hall of Honor on 2 September 2011.
