= Softball at the 2028 Summer Olympics =

Olympic softball tournament in Oklahoma City

Softball at the Games of the XXXIV Olympiad
- Venue: Devon Park (OKC Softball Park) (Note: The name of the venue will be changed to a generic name for the duration of the Olympic Games as the International Olympic Committee does not allow non-sponsoring corporate naming rights on Olympic Games venues.); Oklahoma City, Oklahoma
- Dates: July 23–29, 2028
- Teams: 6

Softball will be reintroduced at the 2028 Summer Olympics in Los Angeles after it was not contested at the 2024 Summer Olympics in Paris. Softball was on the Olympic program from 1996 to 2008. It was introduced at the 1996 Atlanta Olympics and was removed from the program for 2012 and 2016, but was added for a one-off appearance, along with baseball, for the 2020 Summer Olympics (which was postponed to 2021 due to the COVID-19 pandemic).

Olympic softball is governed by the World Baseball Softball Confederation (WBSC).

The competition will be held in Oklahoma City after it was decided not to build new temporary venues in Los Angeles for softball.

== Competition format ==
The softball tournament will feature a single round-robin tournament of six teams in which each team plays one game against each other. The top two teams will advance to a gold medal game, while the third and fourth-placed teams will qualify for the bronze medal game.

== Qualification ==
Six national teams will qualify for the Olympic softball tournament. The United States automatically qualified, as the host nation.

The highest ranked unqualified team of the 2027 Women's Softball World Cup will qualify in April 2027. The WBSC will host three continental qualification events throughout 2027, with one team qualifying for each. The first will consist of four teams from Asia and two from Oceania, the second will have five European teams and one from Africa, and the third will solely host six teams from the Americas. The runner-up and third placed teams in each event will qualify for a final tournament, scheduled to be held no later than March 2028.

Event	Dates	Location(s)	Berth(s)	Qualified
Host nation	—N/a	—N/a	1	United States
2027 Women's Softball World Cup	April 5–11, 2027	Redcliffe	1	
Americas Qualifying Event	August 31 – September 4, 2027	(Mexico) TBD	1	
Asia/Oceania Qualifying Event	September 10–15, 2027	(China) Shaoxing	1	
Africa/Europe Qualifying Event	September 28 – October 3, 2027	(Spain) Barcelona	1	
Final Qualifying Event	No later than March 2028	TBD	1	
Total			6	

== Competition schedule ==
A full day-by-day official schedule was released in November 2025.

Legend

PR	Preliminary round	B	Bronze medal game	F	Gold medal game

Sun 23	Mon 24	Tue 25	Wed 26	Thu 27	Fri 28	Sat 29
PR					B	F
