= Lauren Bay-Regula =

Canadian softball player (born 1981)

Personal information
- Born: August 9, 1981 (age 44) Trail, British Columbia, Canada
- Height: 173 cm (5 ft 8 in)
- Weight: 141 lb (64 kg)

Sport
- Sport: Women's softball
- Position: Pitcher
- Turned pro: 2005
Medal record
Women's softball
Representing Canada
Olympic Games
Bronze medal – third place	2020 Tokyo	Team

Lauren Bay-Regula (born August 9, 1981) is a Canadian softball pitcher. She played college softball at Oklahoma State from 2000 to 2003, where she holds several all-time school records. She was a part of the Canadian softball team who finished ninth at the 2002 World Championships in Saskatoon, Saskatchewan, and fifth at the 2004 Athens Olympics. Bay-Regula pitched in 2005 for the Chicago Bandits of the National Pro Fastpitch and was named co-Pitcher of the Year; in 2006, Bay signed with the expansion Philadelphia Force. Bay-Regula represented Team Canada at the 2020 Summer Olympics and won a bronze medal.

== Early life ==
Regula is originally from Trail, British Columbia, where she began playing softball at age 12.

== Oklahoma State Cowgirls ==
As a freshman, she broke into the Oklahoma State Cowgirls top-10 season records in strikeouts, innings pitched and was selected Second Team All-Big 12.

On March 8, 2001, Bay-Regula threw her first career no-hitter, defeating the FIU Golden Panthers.

For her junior season, Bay-Regula threw two perfect games, the first on February 22, 2002, against the Tulsa Hurricanes. She would add one more as well as break the school records for strikeouts and strikeout ratio. Her wins, innings and shutouts were also all top-10 for a Cowgirl season in a First Team All-Big 12 year.

Bay-Regula's banner senior season boasted her fourth All-Big 12 selection, Big 12 Player of the Year and First Team All-American honors.

She posted her career-best strikeout ratio (12.7, at the time was the NCAA fourth best season ratio), strikeouts and WHIP totals, two of which broke her own school records and remain tops. Bay-Regula's ERA, wins and shutouts, all rank in the top 10 for a school season and also were career bests. Bay-Regula would rank top-5 in ERA, strikeouts and opponents' batting average for the season in the Big 12, all of those marks remain top-10 conference records.

On March 7, 2003, Bay-Regula tied the school single-game record for strikeouts when she fanned 17 in regulation against the Maryland Terrapins.

The win would also kick off a career-best 10 consecutive game win streak that was broken by the Oklahoma Sooners on April 2. In the last game of the next day on the 8th, the win was a 10-inning duel with Courtnay Foster of the Northwestern Wildcats with the two combining for 33 strikeouts and Bay-Regula tallying the 1,000th of her career.

Later that month on March 16, she broke and set the single-game record with 23 strikeouts in 11 innings, defeating the Kansas Jayhawks with a game-winning RBI hit and after the fourth pitching a complete game no-hitter to begin a 27.1 consecutive scoreless inning streak.

The total tied the NCAA fourth best single-game effort for strikeouts and now stands 6th all-time; as well the game featured 31 combined strikeouts with opposing pitcher Kara Pierce. The scoreless streak was snapped by the Tulsa Hurricanes when they scored in Bay-Regula's fourth inning of relief, the Cowgirls eventually won that contest in extras on March 26. She had pitched 5 games, two complete with 54 strikeouts and surrendering only three hits and 7 walks for a 0.37 WHIP.

Bay-Regula would leave with career top-10 records in wins, ERA, shutouts, innings pitched while setting and still claiming the strikeouts and strikeout ratio crowns. For the Big 12, she ranks top-10 in career ERA (8th) and strikeouts (4th).

== Team Canada ==
Having been a member since 1999, Bay-Regula made it to the 2004 Athens Olympics and the 2008 Beijing Olympics. At both events overall, Bay-Regula owns a 5–5 win–loss record, posted 69 strikeouts while giving up 10 earned runs in 56 2/3 innings pitched for a 1.24 ERA. At the Tokyo games, Bay-Regula had a win in five innings of work and won a bronze medal after Canada defeated Team Mexico 3–2 on July 27, 2021.

== National Pro Fastpitch ==
Bay-Regula entered the pros with the Chicago Bandits and played one full season over two years, where she also played for the Philadelphia Force. In 2005, she earned All-NPF West Team honors as well as sharing Pitcher of the Year with teammate Jennie Finch.

On June 30, 2005, Bay-Regula recorded the first no-hitter for the Chicago Bandits vs. the Stratford Brakettes. That same year, Bay-Regula went 17–1 with 137 strikeouts and a 0.88 ERA in 111.0 innings pitched. Bay would also vie for the Cowles Cup Championship on August 28, 2005, but was pulled after four innings and eventually lost the title to the Akron Racers.

== Personal life ==
Her older brother, Jason Bay, was an outfielder in Major League Baseball for the Pittsburgh Pirates. Her husband, David Regula, was a placekicker for Dartmouth College, graduating as the second-leading scorer in school history. In 2015, Lauren and David Regula co-founded TrAk Athletics, a small group training and fitness facility in Akron, Ohio.

== Awards and honors ==
- 2000–2003 All-Big 12 Conference
- 2003 Big 12 Player of the Year
- 2003 Oklahoma State University Female Athlete of the Year
- 2003 NFCA First Team All-American
- 2004 NCAA Oklahoma Woman of the Year
- 2005 All-NPF West Team
- 2005 NPF Co-Pitcher of the Year

== Career statistics ==
=== Oklahoma State Cowgirls ===
YEAR	W	L	GP	GS	CG	SHO	SV	IP	H	R	ER	BB	SO	ERA	WHIP
2000	15	14	37	26	17	5	3	200.2	154	93	54	103	196	1.89	1.28
2001	15	11	31	23	16	6	2	173.2	112	56	31	78	190	1.25	1.09
2002	19	14	40	29	26	7	0	230.2	121	62	42	80	314	1.27	0.87
2003	26	10	40	30	25	10	3	248.1	98	42	29	109	451	0.82	0.83
TOTALS	75	49	148	108	84	28	8	853.1	485	253	156	370	1151	1.28	1.00

== See also ==
- NCAA Division I softball career strikeouts list
