= Kanna Kudo =

Japanese softball player

Bic Camera Takasaki Bee Queen – No. 3
- Infielder
- Born: 3 April 1999 (age 27); Hirosaki, Aomori, Japan
- Bats: Left Throws: Right
Medals
Representing Japan
Softball
World Cup
Gold medal – first place	2024 Castions di Strada	Team
Asian Games
Gold medal – first place	2022 Hangzhou	Team
Gold medal – first place	2026 Aichi–Nagoya	Team
World Games
Silver medal – second place	2022 Birmingham	Team
Bronze medal – third place	2025 Chengdu	Team

Kanna Kudo (Japanese: 工藤 環奈; born 3 April 1999) is a Japanese softball player who plays as an infielder for Bic Camera Takasaki Bee Queen and the Japan women's national softball team. She has won gold medals at the World Games, the Asian Games and the Women's Softball World Cup. Her domestic honours include an East Division Most Valuable Player award, a batting title and two Best Nine selections in the Japan Diamond Softball League.

== Career ==
Kudo was born in Hirosaki, Aomori Prefecture, Japan, and attended Hanamaki Higashi High School in Iwate Prefecture. She joined Bic Camera Takasaki Bee Queen, the women's softball team operated by Bic Camera, and plays as an infielder. She bats left-handed and throws right-handed.

Kudo became a regular player in Japan's domestic softball league. During the 2022 season, Bic Camera Takasaki won the inaugural Japan Diamond Softball League championship. Kudo was part of the team and later discussed the championship in an interview published by her hometown, Hirosaki City.

In the Japan Diamond Softball League, Kudo won the East Division Most Valuable Player award and batting title and was selected to the Best Nine twice. In the 2023 season, she recorded a .409 batting average, 36 hits, seven home runs and 24 runs batted in over 29 games.

Kudo represented Japan at the 2022 World Games in Birmingham, Alabama, where Japan won the women's softball silver medal. She also competed at the 2022 Asian Games in Hangzhou, which were held in 2023, and was part of the Japanese team that won the gold medal.

In 2024, Kudo was selected for Japan's squad for the Women's Softball World Cup Finals. Japan defeated the United States 6–1 in the final to win the championship.

Kudo represented Japan at the 2025 World Games in Chengdu, China. Japan defeated Canada 11–1 in the bronze-medal game on 17 August, securing third place in the women's softball competition. Kudo played as the designated player in the game.

At the 2026 Asian Games in Aichi and Nagoya, Kudo represented Japan in the women's softball tournament. In the final against China on 3 October, she entered as a substitute and hit a run-scoring single as Japan won 7–0, securing its seventh consecutive Asian Games gold medal.
