= Yui Nakamizo =

Japanese softball player

Denso Bright Pegasus – No. 10
- Infielder
- Born: 29 October 1998 (age 28)
- Bats: Right Throws: Right
Medals
Women's softball
Representing Japan
Asian Games
| Gold medal – first place | 2022 Hangzhou | Team |
| Gold medal – first place | 2026 Aichi–Nagoya | Team |

Yui Nakamizo (Japanese: 中溝 優生, Nakamizo Yui; born 29 October 1998) is a Japanese softball player who plays as an infielder for Denso Bright Pegasus and the Japan women's national softball team. She won gold medals in the women's softball tournament at the 2022 Asian Games and the 2026 Asian Games.

== Career ==
Nakamizo attended Saga Joshi High School in Saga Prefecture. She plays as an infielder, bats right-handed and throws right-handed. She joined Denso Bright Pegasus, a Japanese women's softball team, and later became the team's captain. She has competed in Japan's domestic softball league and represented the country in international competitions.

Nakamizo represented Japan at the 2022 Asian Games, held in Hangzhou in 2023 after being postponed because of the COVID-19 pandemic. Japan won the women's softball tournament, defeating China in the final to claim the gold medal. Nakamizo was part of the Japanese squad for the competition.

Nakamizo was selected for Japan's women's softball team at the 2026 Asian Games in Aichi and Nagoya. She played as an infielder during the tournament and hit a home run in Japan's 10–0 victory over the Philippines in the opening game on 26 September. She also hit a home run in Japan's 8–0 win against South Korea on 30 September.

Japan finished the preliminary round undefeated and advanced to the gold-medal game against China on 3 October 2026. Nakamizo started at third base in the final, which Japan won 7–0 in five innings under the tournament's run-difference rule. The victory secured Japan's seventh consecutive Asian Games gold medal in women's softball and Nakamizo's second Asian Games gold medal.
