= Ayane Nakagawa =

Japanese softball player

Toda Chuo Medics – No. 9
- Outfielder
- Born: 18 July 1998 (age 28); Japan
- Bats: Left Throws: Right
Medals
Women's softball
Representing Japan
Asian Games
| Gold medal – first place | 2022 Hangzhou | Team |
| Gold medal – first place | 2026 Aichi–Nagoya | Team |

Ayane Nakagawa (Japanese: 中川 彩音; born 18 July 1998) is a Japanese softball player who plays as an outfielder. She has represented Japan in international competitions, including the Asian Games and the Women's Softball World Cup. She won gold medals with Japan at the 2022 Asian Games and the 2026 Asian Games.

== Career ==
Nakagawa attended Konko Fujin High School in Osaka Prefecture and later played for SG Holdings Galaxy Stars in the Japan Diamond Softball League. She was named to the league's 2024 Best Nine as an outfielder. She subsequently left the Galaxy Stars after two seasons and continued her career with Toda Chuo.

Nakagawa represented Japan at the 2022 Asian Games in Hangzhou, which were held in September and October 2023. Japan won the women's softball tournament, earning Nakagawa an Asian Games gold medal.

At the 2023 Women's Softball World Cup opening round, Nakagawa was one of Japan's leading hitters. The World Baseball Softball Confederation reported that she led the tournament in hits, stolen bases, runs and triples, and finished tied for second in batting average at .500.

Nakagawa was selected for Japan's team at the 2026 Asian Games in Aichi and Nagoya. Listed as an outfielder in the Japanese Softball Association's squad, she won a second Asian Games gold medal as Japan won the women's softball tournament.
