= Kyoko Ishikawa =

Japanese softball player

Toyota Red Terriers
- Infielder
- Born: May 28, 1996 (age 30); Tokyo, Japan
- Bats: Left Throws: Right
Medals
Women's softball
Representing Japan
World Cup
Gold medal – first place	2024 Castions di Strada	Team
Asian Games
Gold medal – first place	2018 Jakarta–Palembang	Team
Gold medal – first place	2022 Hangzhou	Team
Gold medal – first place	2026 Aichi–Nagoya	Team

Kyoko Ishikawa (Japanese: 石川 恭子; born 28 May 1996) is a Japanese softball player who plays as an infielder for the Toyota Red Terriers and the Japan women's national softball team. She has won three Asian Games gold medals and a Women's Softball World Cup title with Japan.

== Career ==
Ishikawa was born in Tokyo and attended Fujimura Girls' High School before studying at Sonoda Women's University in Hyōgo Prefecture. She played as a shortstop and developed into a leading hitter during her university career.

In 2019, Ishikawa joined the Toyota Red Terriers, Toyota Motor Corporation's women's softball team competing in Japan's top domestic league. She established herself as an infielder and became one of the team's regular hitters. Her domestic league honours include two batting titles, two Best Nine selections and a rookie award.

Ishikawa has represented Japan at several major international tournaments. She was part of the Japanese women's team that won the gold medal at the 2018 Asian Games in Jakarta and Palembang and the 2022 Asian Games in Hangzhou, which were held in 2023 because of the COVID-19 pandemic.

In July 2024, Ishikawa captained Japan at the Women's Softball World Cup Finals in Italy. Japan advanced through the tournament and defeated the United States 6–1 in the final to win the world title.

At the 2026 Asian Games in Aichi and Nagoya, Ishikawa represented Japan in the women's softball tournament. She hit a triple in the final against China on 3 October as Japan won 7–0, securing its seventh consecutive Asian Games title and Ishikawa's third gold medal at the Games.
