= Softball at the 2026 Asian Games =

- Venue: Anjo Softball Ground
- Dates: 26 September – 3 October 2026
- Competitors: 136 from 8 nations

Women's softball at the 2026 Asian Games was held between 26 September and 3 October 2026 at Anjo Sports Park Softball Ground in Aichi.

== Schedule ==
P	Preliminary round	F	Finals

Event↓/Date →	26th Sat	27th Sun	28th Mon	29th Tue	30th Wed	1st Thu	2nd Fri	3rd Sat
Women	P	P	P	P	P	P	P	F

== Medalists ==
Event	Gold	Silver	Bronze
Women	Japan; Mio Sakamoto; Sakura Miwa; Kanna Kudo; Shiho Suto; Kyoko Ishikawa; Ayane Nakagawa; Minori Naito; Eri Shimoyama; Mayu Okawa; Yukiko Ueno; Risa Kawamura; Yui Nakamizo; Urara Fujimoto; Yume Kiriishi; Hotaru Tsukamoto; Miu Goto; Saori Yamauchi	China; Wang Mengru; Wei Yuchen; Li Xintian; Sang Yujuan; Ding Xiaoyi; Lu Xiaomin; Gui Yuanyuan; Wang Yarui; Yan Siyu; Sun Yue; Yang Huiqi; Xie Jiaxin; Chai Yinan; He Xiaoyan; Ren Min; Lu Ying; Xi Kailin	Chinese Taipei; Shen Chia-wen; Ke Hsia-ai; Li Szu-shih; Lin Chi-yun; Ho Yi-fan; Chen Ching-yu; Su Yi-hsuan; Chiang Ting-en; Yeh Kuei-ping; Yang An-chi; Pan Yu-ling; Liu Hsuan; Chen Chia-yi; Chu Yi-shan; Tu Ya-ting; Lin Feng-chen; Lin Chih-ying

== Qualification ==
The top eight of ten participating teams at the 2025 Women's Softball Asia Cup qualified for the softball tournament of the 2026 Asian Games. The eight participating teams were drawn in a single group and arranged based on their WSBC World Ranking.

- Japan
- China
- Chinese Taipei
- Philippines
- South Korea
- Hong Kong
- Singapore
- Thailand

== Squads ==
Squads

China	Chinese Taipei	Hong Kong	Japan
Wang Mengru; Wei Yuchen; Li Xintian; Sang Yujuan; Ding Xiaoyi; Lu Xiaomin; Gui Yuanyuan; Wang Yarui; Yan Siyu; Sun Yue; Yang Huiqi; Xie Jiaxin; Chai Yinan; He Xiaoyan; Ren Min; Lu Ying; Xi Kailin	Shen Chia-wen; Ke Hsia-ai; Li Szu-shih; Lin Chi-yun; Ho Yi-fan; Chen Ching-yu; Su Yi-hsuan; Chiang Ting-en; Yeh Kuei-ping; Yang An-chi; Pan Yu-ling; Liu Hsuan; Chen Chia-yi; Chu Yi-shan; Tu Ya-ting; Lin Feng-chen; Lin Chih-ying	Lau Hiu Kwan; Leung Tsz Yan; Chan Yee Lam; Au Yeung Chi Ching; Chiu Hiu Wai; Wong Ho Ching; Chiu Lee Chi; Chan Sau Yui; Chan Wing Sum; Pong Yui Chi; Jasmine Chan; Lai Lok Tung; Chan Hiu Yan; Lau Suet Man; Wong Cho Hei; Lam Pui Kwan; Tina Lam	Mio Sakamoto; Sakura Miwa; Kanna Kudo; Shiho Suto; Kyoko Ishikawa; Ayane Nakagawa; Minori Naito; Eri Shimoyama; Mayu Okawa; Yukiko Ueno; Risa Kawamura; Yui Nakamizo; Urara Fujimoto; Yume Kiriishi; Hotaru Tsukamoto; Miu Goto; Saori Yamauchi
Philippines	Singapore	South Korea	Thailand
Skylynne Ellazar; Mea Tubongbanua; Cheska Altomonte; Victoria Magbanua; Alyssa Daniell; Charlotte Sales; Mylia Perez; Reyae Villamin; Mary Joy Alpitche; Royevel Palma; Nicole Hammoude; Roma Jane Cruz; Sydney Vitangcol; Mary Joy Laurente; Mary Jane Libaton; Angelu Gabriel; Glory Alonzo	Teresa Chua; Stefani Choong; Charlize Goh; Bowie Tan; Cacia Tan; Charmaine Chua; Jaelene Lee; Alexis Gok; Lexguas Ho; Eliza Lim; Janice Tan; Kelly-Ann Goh; Shanice Lim; Tay Zu Yun; Andrea Lim; Adelia Koh; Chua Si Ning	Ju Hyo-ju; Kim Ah-young; Hong Si-yeon; Lee Min-jeong; Lee Kyung-min; Choi Ga-hyun; Jang Se-jin; Choe Yeon-ji; Choi Hye-been; Kim Su-bin; Kim Ha-neul; Bae Yu-ka; Jeong Yeon-woo; Kim Ji-yun; Heo A-young; Jung Song-hee; Park Min-kyoung	Kanyawan Sila; Jirarak Kako; Supatra Thainoy; Jirapinya Sonklang; Sudarat Wiangkhamfa; Puntaree Khamhintang; Thanaporn Tipdee; Thanyathon Singhaampon; Mechawee Thanachanthonwaj; Warisa Mankong; Yanisa Suwannaree; Kanokwan Phadungcharoen; Nessara Utthong; Nannapas Wattaprom; Sirada Charoenphon; Nutdaphorn Srikongmueang; Nanthicha Siriwadee

== Results ==
All times are Japan Standard Time (UTC+09:00)

=== Preliminary round ===
Pos	Team	Pld	W	L	RF	RA	PCT	GB	Qualification
1	Japan	7	7	0	69	8	1.000	—	Gold medal
2	China	7	6	1	66	17	.857	1	Gold medal
3	Chinese Taipei	7	5	2	68	17	.714	2	Bronze medal
4	Philippines	7	4	3	34	33	.571	3	Bronze medal
5	South Korea	7	3	4	31	36	.429	4	
6	Hong Kong	7	2	5	20	60	.286	5	
7	Singapore	7	1	6	15	57	.143	6	
8	Thailand	7	0	7	7	82	.000	7	

Source: WBSC Asia

26 September; 9:00	China	13–0 (F/4)	Singapore	Anjo Softball Ground, Anjo; Attendance: 210; Umpires: Ayaka Sasajima (JPN)
26 September; 9:00	WP: Wei Yuchen	Boxscore	LP: Adelia Koh	Anjo Softball Ground, Anjo; Attendance: 210; Umpires: Ayaka Sasajima (JPN)
26 September; 9:00	HR: Ren Min (1)	Boxscore		Anjo Softball Ground, Anjo; Attendance: 210; Umpires: Ayaka Sasajima (JPN)

Team	1	2	3	4	5	6	7	R	H	E
China	2	1	0	10	—	—	—	13	14	0
Singapore	0	0	0	0	—	—	—	0	2	1

26 September; 11:00	Hong Kong	3–10 (F/5)	Chinese Taipei	Anjo Softball Ground, Anjo; Attendance: 350; Umpires: Pansiri Jaidee (THA)
26 September; 11:00	LP: Lau Suet Man	Boxscore	WP: Ke Hsia-ai; Sv: Tu Ya-ting	Anjo Softball Ground, Anjo; Attendance: 350; Umpires: Pansiri Jaidee (THA)

Team	1	2	3	4	5	6	7	R	H	E
Hong Kong	0	1	0	0	2	—	—	3	6	3
Chinese Taipei	0	4	1	3	2	—	—	10	8	0

26 September; 13:15	Thailand	0–7 (F/5)	South Korea	Anjo Softball Ground, Anjo; Attendance: 550; Umpires: Chen Jun (CHN)
26 September; 13:15	LP: Nessara Utthong	Boxscore	WP: Hong Si-yeon	Anjo Softball Ground, Anjo; Attendance: 550; Umpires: Chen Jun (CHN)

Team	1	2	3	4	5	6	7	R	H	E
Thailand	0	0	0	0	0	—	—	0	3	2
South Korea	2	1	0	1	3	—	—	7	8	0

26 September; 16:30	Philippines	0–10 (F/4)	Japan	Anjo Softball Ground, Anjo; Attendance: 700; Umpires: Foo Lai Meng (SGP)
26 September; 16:30	LP: Royevel Palma	Boxscore	WP: Mio Sakamoto	Anjo Softball Ground, Anjo; Attendance: 700; Umpires: Foo Lai Meng (SGP)
26 September; 16:30		Boxscore	HR: Yui Nakamizo (1)	Anjo Softball Ground, Anjo; Attendance: 700; Umpires: Foo Lai Meng (SGP)

Team	1	2	3	4	5	6	7	R	H	E
Philippines	0	0	0	0	—	—	—	0	2	3
Japan	0	9	0	1	—	—	—	10	10	0

27 September; 9:00	South Korea	4–8	China	Anjo Softball Ground, Anjo; Attendance: 320; Umpires: Leonardo Belgar (PHI)
27 September; 9:00	LP: Park Min-kyoung	Boxscore	WP: Chai Yinan	Anjo Softball Ground, Anjo; Attendance: 320; Umpires: Leonardo Belgar (PHI)
27 September; 9:00		Boxscore	HR: Xi Kailin (1), Yan Siyu (1), Ren Min (1)	Anjo Softball Ground, Anjo; Attendance: 320; Umpires: Leonardo Belgar (PHI)

Team	1	2	3	4	5	6	7	R	H	E
South Korea	0	0	1	0	1	0	2	4	6	0
China	0	1	0	3	4	0	X	8	12	2

27 September; 11:30	Philippines	1–10 (F/5)	Chinese Taipei	Anjo Softball Ground, Anjo; Attendance: 255; Umpires: Koji Ogawa (JPN)
27 September; 11:30	LP: Mary Joy Alpitche	Boxscore	WP: Tu Ya-ting	Anjo Softball Ground, Anjo; Attendance: 255; Umpires: Koji Ogawa (JPN)
27 September; 11:30		Boxscore	HR: Liu Hsuan (1)	Anjo Softball Ground, Anjo; Attendance: 255; Umpires: Koji Ogawa (JPN)

Team	1	2	3	4	5	6	7	R	H	E
Philippines	1	0	0	0	0	—	—	1	5	2
Chinese Taipei	1	3	6	0	X	—	—	10	9	1

27 September; 13:15	Hong Kong	5–2	Singapore	Anjo Softball Ground, Anjo; Attendance: 1,100; Umpires: Norikazu Hamasaki (JPN)
27 September; 13:15	WP: Lau Suet Man	Boxscore	LP: Adelia Koh	Anjo Softball Ground, Anjo; Attendance: 1,100; Umpires: Norikazu Hamasaki (JPN)
27 September; 13:15		Boxscore	HR: Bowie Tan (1)	Anjo Softball Ground, Anjo; Attendance: 1,100; Umpires: Norikazu Hamasaki (JPN)

Team	1	2	3	4	5	6	7	R	H	E
Hong Kong	1	1	1	0	2	—	—	5	8	1
Singapore	0	1	1	0	0	—	—	2	5	0

- The game was called after five innings due to rain.

28 September; 10:30	Singapore	2–9 (F/5)	Chinese Taipei	Anjo Softball Ground, Anjo; Attendance: 660; Umpires: Cho Hee-young (KOR)
28 September; 10:30	LP: Adelia Koh	Boxscore	WP: Chu Yi-shan	Anjo Softball Ground, Anjo; Attendance: 660; Umpires: Cho Hee-young (KOR)
28 September; 10:30		Boxscore	HR: Lin Chi-yun (1), Shen Chia-wen (1)	Anjo Softball Ground, Anjo; Attendance: 660; Umpires: Cho Hee-young (KOR)

Team	1	2	3	4	5	6	7	R	H	E
Singapore	0	0	1	0	1	—	—	2	6	1
Chinese Taipei	0	1	6	1	1	—	—	9	10	0

28 September; 12:30	South Korea	3–7	Philippines	Anjo Softball Ground, Anjo; Attendance: 460; Umpires: Pan Chih-ming (TPE)
28 September; 12:30	LP: Choe Yeon-ji	Boxscore	WP: Glory Alonzo	Anjo Softball Ground, Anjo; Attendance: 460; Umpires: Pan Chih-ming (TPE)
28 September; 12:30	HR: Kim Ah-young (1)	Boxscore	HR: Charlotte Sales (1)	Anjo Softball Ground, Anjo; Attendance: 460; Umpires: Pan Chih-ming (TPE)

Team	1	2	3	4	5	6	7	R	H	E
South Korea	0	0	0	3	0	0	0	3	8	1
Philippines	0	0	0	0	0	7	X	7	10	0

28 September; 15:20	Thailand	0–15 (F/3)	China	Anjo Softball Ground, Anjo; Attendance: 330; Umpires: Koji Ogawa (JPN)
28 September; 15:20	LP: Sudarat Wiangkhamfa	Boxscore	WP: Sun Yue	Anjo Softball Ground, Anjo; Attendance: 330; Umpires: Koji Ogawa (JPN)
28 September; 15:20		Boxscore	HR: Yang Huiqi (1), Ren Min (1), Lu Ying (1), Li Xintian (1)	Anjo Softball Ground, Anjo; Attendance: 330; Umpires: Koji Ogawa (JPN)

Team	1	2	3	4	5	6	7	R	H	E
Thailand	0	0	0	—	—	—	—	0	0	1
China	6	4	5	—	—	—	—	15	11	0

28 September; 16:50	Hong Kong	0–15 (F/3)	Japan	Anjo Softball Ground, Anjo; Attendance: 720; Umpires: Leonardo Belgar (PHI)
28 September; 16:50	LP: Tina Lam	Boxscore	WP: Mio Sakamoto	Anjo Softball Ground, Anjo; Attendance: 720; Umpires: Leonardo Belgar (PHI)
28 September; 16:50		Boxscore	HR: Saori Yamauchi (1), Yui Nakamizo (1)	Anjo Softball Ground, Anjo; Attendance: 720; Umpires: Leonardo Belgar (PHI)

Team	1	2	3	4	5	6	7	R	H	E
Hong Kong	0	0	0	—	—	—	—	0	0	2
Japan	7	6	2	—	—	—	—	15	16	0

28 September; 18:15	Thailand	0–15 (F/3)	Japan	Anjo Softball Ground, Anjo; Attendance: 730; Umpires: Huang Youhan (CHN)
28 September; 18:15	LP: Nutdaphorn Srikongmueang	Boxscore	WP: Sakura Miwa	Anjo Softball Ground, Anjo; Attendance: 730; Umpires: Huang Youhan (CHN)
28 September; 18:15		Boxscore	HR: Saori Yamauchi (1), Yui Nakamizo (1)	Anjo Softball Ground, Anjo; Attendance: 730; Umpires: Huang Youhan (CHN)

Team	1	2	3	4	5	6	7	R	H	E
Thailand	0	0	0	—	—	—	—	0	3	0
Japan	3	9	3	—	—	—	—	15	11	0

29 September; 11:30	Philippines	7–0 (F/5)	Thailand	Anjo Softball Ground, Anjo; Attendance: 110; Umpires: Pan Chih-ming (TPE)
29 September; 11:30	WP: Mary Joy Alpitche	Boxscore	LP: Nessara Utthong	Anjo Softball Ground, Anjo; Attendance: 110; Umpires: Pan Chih-ming (TPE)
29 September; 11:30	HR: Charlotte Sales (1)	Boxscore		Anjo Softball Ground, Anjo; Attendance: 110; Umpires: Pan Chih-ming (TPE)

Team	1	2	3	4	5	6	7	R	H	E
Philippines	0	2	3	1	1	—	—	7	8	0
Thailand	0	0	0	0	0	—	—	0	2	2

29 September; 13:30	Chinese Taipei	4–5	China	Anjo Softball Ground, Anjo; Attendance: 320; Umpires: Mari Jinno (JPN)
29 September; 13:30	LP: Ke Hsia-ai	Boxscore	WP: Chai Yinan	Anjo Softball Ground, Anjo; Attendance: 320; Umpires: Mari Jinno (JPN)
29 September; 13:30	HR: Lin Feng-chen (1)	Boxscore	HR: Sang Yujuan (1)	Anjo Softball Ground, Anjo; Attendance: 320; Umpires: Mari Jinno (JPN)

Team	1	2	3	4	5	6	7	R	H	E
Chinese Taipei	0	0	0	0	4	0	0	4	6	0
China	1	0	0	4	0	0	X	5	10	0

- The game was suspended due to rain after the end of the fourth inning and resumed on 30 September at 10:00.

30 September; 11:00	Hong Kong	1–7	South Korea	Anjo Softball Ground, Anjo; Attendance: 290; Umpires: Nikorn Sonchan (THA)
30 September; 11:00	LP: Lau Suet Man	Boxscore	WP: Hong Si-yeon; Sv: Kim Ha-neul	Anjo Softball Ground, Anjo; Attendance: 290; Umpires: Nikorn Sonchan (THA)

Team	1	2	3	4	5	6	7	R	H	E
Hong Kong	0	0	0	0	1	0	0	1	4	2
South Korea	0	0	2	2	2	1	X	7	11	0

30 September; 13:00	Singapore	0–10 (F/4)	Japan	Anjo Softball Ground, Anjo; Attendance: 1,050; Umpires: Oh Pil-kyu (KOR)
30 September; 13:00	LP: Charlize Goh	Boxscore	WP: Sakura Miwa	Anjo Softball Ground, Anjo; Attendance: 1,050; Umpires: Oh Pil-kyu (KOR)

Team	1	2	3	4	5	6	7	R	H	E
Singapore	0	0	0	0	—	—	—	0	1	1
Japan	0	5	0	5	—	—	—	10	8	0

30 September; 14:30	Chinese Taipei	22–1 (F/4)	Thailand	Anjo Softball Ground, Anjo; Attendance: 180; Umpires: Ahmad Masran Hassan (SGP)
30 September; 14:30	WP: Ke Hsia-ai	Boxscore	LP: Nutdaphorn Srikongmueang	Anjo Softball Ground, Anjo; Attendance: 180; Umpires: Ahmad Masran Hassan (SGP)
30 September; 14:30	HR: Liu Hsuan (1), Su Yi-hsuan (1)	Boxscore		Anjo Softball Ground, Anjo; Attendance: 180; Umpires: Ahmad Masran Hassan (SGP)

Team	1	2	3	4	5	6	7	R	H	E
Chinese Taipei	3	9	0	10	—	—	—	22	20	0
Thailand	0	0	0	1	—	—	—	1	5	5

30 September; 16:45	China	12–2 (F/5)	Hong Kong	Anjo Softball Ground, Anjo; Attendance: 180; Umpires: Kim Hyung-suk (KOR)
30 September; 16:45	WP: Wei Yuchen	Boxscore	LP: Tina Lam	Anjo Softball Ground, Anjo; Attendance: 180; Umpires: Kim Hyung-suk (KOR)
30 September; 16:45	HR: Lu Ying (1)	Boxscore		Anjo Softball Ground, Anjo; Attendance: 180; Umpires: Kim Hyung-suk (KOR)

Team	1	2	3	4	5	6	7	R	H	E
China	6	1	0	4	1	—	—	12	19	0
Hong Kong	0	2	0	0	0	—	—	2	5	0

30 September; 18:15	Philippines	10–0 (F/4)	Singapore	Anjo Softball Ground, Anjo; Attendance: 360; Umpires: Mari Jinno (JPN)
30 September; 18:15	WP: Mary Joy Alpitche	Boxscore	LP: Adelia Koh	Anjo Softball Ground, Anjo; Attendance: 360; Umpires: Mari Jinno (JPN)
30 September; 18:15	HR: Mylia Perez (1), Nicole Hammoude (1)	Boxscore		Anjo Softball Ground, Anjo; Attendance: 360; Umpires: Mari Jinno (JPN)

Team	1	2	3	4	5	6	7	R	H	E
Philippines	6	1	3	0	—	—	—	10	12	1
Singapore	0	0	0	0	—	—	—	0	1	1

30 September; 20:00	Japan	8–0 (F/6)	South Korea	Anjo Softball Ground, Anjo; Attendance: 500; Umpires: Pansiri Jaidee (THA)
30 September; 20:00	WP: Miu Goto	Boxscore	LP: Park Min-kyoung	Anjo Softball Ground, Anjo; Attendance: 500; Umpires: Pansiri Jaidee (THA)
30 September; 20:00		Boxscore	HR: Yui Nakamizo (1)	Anjo Softball Ground, Anjo; Attendance: 500; Umpires: Pansiri Jaidee (THA)

Team	1	2	3	4	5	6	7	R	H	E
Japan	0	0	1	1	2	4	—	8	11	1
South Korea	0	0	0	0	0	0	—	0	0	1

1 October; 9:00	Hong Kong	6–5	Thailand	Anjo Softball Ground, Anjo; Attendance: 260; Umpires: Lin Ming-i (TPE)
1 October; 9:00	WP: Lau Suet Man	Boxscore	LP: Nessara Utthong	Anjo Softball Ground, Anjo; Attendance: 260; Umpires: Lin Ming-i (TPE)
1 October; 9:00		Boxscore	HR: Puntaree Khamhintang (1)	Anjo Softball Ground, Anjo; Attendance: 260; Umpires: Lin Ming-i (TPE)

Team	1	2	3	4	5	6	7	R	H	E
Hong Kong	2	0	0	0	0	1	3	6	5	0
Thailand	3	2	0	0	0	0	0	5	9	2

1 October; 11:20	Philippines	0–7 (F/5)	China	Anjo Softball Ground, Anjo; Attendance: 180; Umpires: Ayaka Sasajima (JPN)
1 October; 11:20	LP: Glory Alonzo	Boxscore	WP: Chai Yinan	Anjo Softball Ground, Anjo; Attendance: 180; Umpires: Ayaka Sasajima (JPN)
1 October; 11:20		Boxscore	HR: Ren Min (1), Xie Jiaxin (1)	Anjo Softball Ground, Anjo; Attendance: 180; Umpires: Ayaka Sasajima (JPN)

Team	1	2	3	4	5	6	7	R	H	E
Philippines	0	0	0	0	0	—	—	0	2	0
China	0	1	2	0	4	—	—	7	8	1

1 October; 13:15	Singapore	1–9 (F/5)	South Korea	Anjo Softball Ground, Anjo; Attendance: 300; Umpires: Chen Jun (CHN)
1 October; 13:15	LP: Jaelene Lee	Boxscore	WP: Hong Si-yeon	Anjo Softball Ground, Anjo; Attendance: 300; Umpires: Chen Jun (CHN)

Team	1	2	3	4	5	6	7	R	H	E
Singapore	0	0	1	0	0	—	—	1	5	4
South Korea	0	5	3	1	X	—	—	9	9	1

1 October; 15:15	Chinese Taipei	2–4	Japan	Anjo Softball Ground, Anjo; Attendance: 950; Umpires: Nor Hajar Abd Hamid (MAS)
1 October; 15:15	LP: Ke Hsia-ai	Boxscore	WP: Yukiko Ueno	Anjo Softball Ground, Anjo; Attendance: 950; Umpires: Nor Hajar Abd Hamid (MAS)

Team	1	2	3	4	5	6	7	R	H	E
Chinese Taipei	0	0	1	1	0	0	0	2	7	0
Japan	0	0	2	0	0	2	X	4	6	1

2 October; 9:00	Philippines	9–3	Hong Kong	Anjo Softball Ground, Anjo; Attendance: 200; Umpires: Norikazu Hamasaki (JPN)
2 October; 9:00	WP: Royevel Palma	Boxscore	LP: Lau Suet Man	Anjo Softball Ground, Anjo; Attendance: 200; Umpires: Norikazu Hamasaki (JPN)
2 October; 9:00	HR: Angelu Gabriel (1), Reyae Villamin (1), Roma Jane Cruz (1)	Boxscore		Anjo Softball Ground, Anjo; Attendance: 200; Umpires: Norikazu Hamasaki (JPN)

Team	1	2	3	4	5	6	7	R	H	E
Philippines	1	5	1	0	2	0	0	9	10	1
Hong Kong	0	0	3	0	0	0	0	3	8	3

2 October; 11:00	South Korea	1–11 (F/4)	Chinese Taipei	Anjo Softball Ground, Anjo; Attendance: 560; Umpires: Nikorn Sonchan (THA)
2 October; 11:00	LP: Choe Yeon-ji	Boxscore	WP: Tu Ya-ting	Anjo Softball Ground, Anjo; Attendance: 560; Umpires: Nikorn Sonchan (THA)
2 October; 11:00		Boxscore	HR: Chen Chia-yi (1)	Anjo Softball Ground, Anjo; Attendance: 560; Umpires: Nikorn Sonchan (THA)

Team	1	2	3	4	5	6	7	R	H	E
South Korea	0	1	0	0	—	—	—	1	4	1
Chinese Taipei	0	0	1	10	—	—	—	11	8	1

2 October; 13:15	Thailand	1–10 (F/5)	Singapore	Anjo Softball Ground, Anjo; Attendance: 500; Umpires: Lo Wing Yan (HKG)
2 October; 13:15	LP: Nessara Utthong	Boxscore	WP: Adelia Koh	Anjo Softball Ground, Anjo; Attendance: 500; Umpires: Lo Wing Yan (HKG)

Team	1	2	3	4	5	6	7	R	H	E
Thailand	1	0	0	0	0	—	—	1	6	2
Singapore	5	4	1	0	X	—	—	10	7	2

2 October; 15:15	China	6–7	Japan	Anjo Softball Ground, Anjo; Attendance: 850; Umpires: Foo Lai Meng (SGP)
2 October; 15:15	LP: Sun Yue	Boxscore	WP: Yukiko Ueno	Anjo Softball Ground, Anjo; Attendance: 850; Umpires: Foo Lai Meng (SGP)
2 October; 15:15	HR: Ren Min (1), Xi Kailin (1), Lu Ying (1)	Boxscore	HR: Ayane Nakagawa (1)	Anjo Softball Ground, Anjo; Attendance: 850; Umpires: Foo Lai Meng (SGP)

Team	1	2	3	4	5	6	7	R	H	E
China	0	1	2	0	2	1	0	6	11	0
Japan	2	2	0	2	0	0	1	7	7	0

=== Final round ===
==== Bronze medal ====
3 October; 10:00	Philippines	2–12 (F/4)	Chinese Taipei	Anjo Softball Ground, Anjo; Attendance: 1,250; Umpires: Ayaka Sasajima (JPN)
3 October; 10:00	LP: Royevel Palma	Boxscore	WP: Tu Ya-ting	Anjo Softball Ground, Anjo; Attendance: 1,250; Umpires: Ayaka Sasajima (JPN)
3 October; 10:00	HR: Nicole Hammoude (1)	Boxscore	HR: Lin Feng-chen (1), Chen Chia-yi (1), Yeh Kuei-ping (1)	Anjo Softball Ground, Anjo; Attendance: 1,250; Umpires: Ayaka Sasajima (JPN)

Team	1	2	3	4	5	6	7	R	H	E
Philippines	0	0	2	0	—	—	—	2	4	1
Chinese Taipei	4	8	0	X	—	—	—	12	13	0

==== Gold medal ====
3 October; 14:00	China	0–7 (F/5)	Japan	Anjo Softball Ground, Anjo; Attendance: 2,700; Umpires: Kim Hyung-suk (KOR)
3 October; 14:00	LP: Chai Yinan	Boxscore	WP: Miu Goto	Anjo Softball Ground, Anjo; Attendance: 2,700; Umpires: Kim Hyung-suk (KOR)

Team	1	2	3	4	5	6	7	R	H	E
China	0	0	0	0	0	—	—	0	2	1
Japan	0	2	0	3	2	—	—	7	9	0

== Final standing ==
Rank	Team	Pld	W	L
1st place, gold medalist(s)	Japan	8	8	0
2nd place, silver medalist(s)	China	8	6	2
3rd place, bronze medalist(s)	Chinese Taipei	8	6	2
4	Philippines	8	4	4
5	South Korea	7	3	4
6	Hong Kong	7	2	5
7	Singapore	7	1	6
8	Thailand	7	0	7
