= Saori Yamauchi =

Japanese softball player

Bic Camera Takasaki Bee Queen – No. 25
- Catcher
- Born: September 3, 1999 (age 27); Yamaguchi Prefecture, Japan
- Bats: Left Throws: Right
Medals
Women's softball
Representing Japan
Asian Games
Gold medal – first place	2026 Aichi–Nagoya	Team

Saori Yamauchi (Japanese: 山内 早織, Yamauchi Saori; born 3 September 1999) is a Japanese softball player who plays as a catcher for Bic Camera Takasaki Bee Queen and the Japan women's national softball team. She won a gold medal with Japan at the 2026 Asian Games.

== Career ==
Yamauchi attended Shimizugaoka High School in Hiroshima Prefecture before joining Bic Camera Takasaki Bee Queen, a Japanese women's softball team. She plays as a catcher, bats left-handed and throws right-handed. Her offensive strengths include hitting for power, particularly to the opposite field.

Yamauchi has represented Japan in international softball competitions. She was selected for the Japanese women's national team for the 2026 Asian Games in Aichi and Nagoya. She started as catcher in Japan's opening match against the Philippines on 26 September 2026, a 10–0 victory. Japan also defeated Hong Kong, Thailand and Singapore during the preliminary round. During the preliminary round, Yamauchi contributed defensively behind Japan's pitching staff and offensively at the plate. She hit a home run in Japan's 15–0 victory over Hong Kong on 28 September and a double in the 8–0 win against South Korea on 30 September. Japan finished the preliminary round with seven wins and advanced to the final against China. Japan faced China in the gold-medal game on 3 October 2026. Yamauchi started at catcher as Japan won 7–0 in five innings under the tournament's run-difference rule. The victory secured Japan's seventh consecutive Asian Games gold medal in women's softball.
