= Mayu Okawa =

Japanese softball player

Honda Reverta – No. 11
- Infielder
- Born: March 10, 2000 (age 26); Tochigi Prefecture, Japan
- Bats: Left Throws: Right
Medals
Women's softball
Representing Japan
Asian Games
Gold medal – first place	2026 Aichi–Nagoya	Team

Mayu Okawa (Japanese: 大川 茉由; born March 10, 2000) is a Japanese softball player who plays as an infielder for Honda Reverta. She has represented Japan in international softball competitions, including the 2026 Asian Games, where she won a gold medal as a member of the Japanese women's national team.

== Career ==
Okawa attended Hanasaki Tokuharu High School before studying at Tokyo Women's College of Physical Education. She joined Honda's softball team, Honda Reverta, and plays as an infielder. She bats left-handed and throws right-handed.

Okawa has represented Japan in international competitions. During the 2024 Japan–USA All-Star Series, she recorded two hits and one run batted in in the second game, according to the official Japanese softball statistics. She was also included in Japan's national team for the 2026 Asian Games.

At the 2026 Asian Games in Aichi and Nagoya, Okawa played for Japan in the women's softball competition. In a match against singapore during the tournament, she hit a double that helped Japan extend its lead; the Japan Softball Association's official match report documented her contribution to the team's scoring. Japan won the women's softball gold medal at the Games, giving Okawa an Asian Games gold medal.
