= Softball at the 2022 Asian Games =

Delayed sports event in Zhejiang, China

- Venue: Shaoxing Baseball & Softball Sports Center
- Dates: 26 September – 2 October 2023
- Competitors: 135 from 8 nations

Softball at the 2022 Asian Games was held at the Baseball & Softball Sports Center in Shaoxing, Zhejiang, China, from 26 September to 2 October 2023. The only event held was the women's softball.

== Schedule ==
P	Preliminary round	S	Super round	F	Finals

Event↓/Date →	26th Tue	27th Wed	28th Thu	29th Fri	30th Sat	1st Sun	2nd Mon
Women	P	P	P	S	S		F

== Medalists ==
Event	Gold	Silver	Bronze
Women	Japan; Sakura Miwa; Kanna Kudo; Yui Nakamizo; Kyoko Ishikawa; Yui Sakamoto; Nodoka Harada; Ayane Nakagawa; Hitomi Kawabata; Minori Naito; Yukiko Ueno; Misaki Katsumata; Risa Kawamura; Yume Kiriishi; Haruka Agatsuma; Hotaru Tsukamoto; Miu Goto; Haruka Sumitani	China; Wang Mengru; Wei Yuchen; Xi Kailin; Li Jiaqi; Xie Yue; Chen Jia; Wang Bei; Lu Xiaomin; Xu Jia; Yan Siyu; Dong Zixuan; Wang Lan; Jiang Xinyue; Xie Jiaxin; Chai Yinan; He Xiaoyan; Ren Min	Chinese Taipei; Shen Chia-wen; Ke Hsia-ai; Li Szu-shih; Lin Feng-chen; Chen Ching-yu; Su Yi-hsuan; Ko Chia-hui; Tsai Chia-chen; Ho Yi-fan; Lin Chih-ying; Liu Hsuan; Chiu An-ju; Chiang Ting-en; Yang Yi-ting; Chen Chia-yi; Chang Chia-yun; Tu Ya-ting

== Draw ==
Group A

- Japan
- Chinese Taipei
- Hong Kong
- Singapore

Group B

- China
- Philippines
- South Korea
- Thailand

== Squads ==
Squads

China	Chinese Taipei	Hong Kong	Japan
Wang Mengru; Wei Yuchen; Xi Kailin; Li Jiaqi; Xie Yue; Chen Jia; Wang Bei; Lu Xiaomin; Xu Jia; Yan Siyu; Dong Zixuan; Wang Lan; Jiang Xinyue; Xie Jiaxin; Chai Yinan; He Xiaoyan; Ren Min	Shen Chia-wen; Ke Hsia-ai; Li Szu-shih; Lin Feng-chen; Chen Ching-yu; Su Yi-hsuan; Ko Chia-hui; Tsai Chia-chen; Ho Yi-fan; Lin Chih-ying; Liu Hsuan; Chiu An-ju; Chiang Ting-en; Yang Yi-ting; Chen Chia-yi; Chang Chia-yun; Tu Ya-ting	Lau Hiu Kwan; Law Wai Tak; Leung Tsz Yan; Chan Yee Lam; Chiu Hiu Wai; Chan Wing Sum; Hui Kai Yan; Lo Wing Yan; Law Cheuk Ying; Pong Yui Chi; Lai Wing Sze; Yuen Ching Yi; Chan Hiu Yan; Lau Suet Man; Tiffany Chan; Wong Cho Hei; Lam Pui Kwan	Sakura Miwa; Kanna Kudo; Yui Nakamizo; Kyoko Ishikawa; Yui Sakamoto; Nodoka Harada; Ayane Nakagawa; Hitomi Kawabata; Minori Naito; Yukiko Ueno; Misaki Katsumata; Risa Kawamura; Yume Kiriishi; Haruka Agatsuma; Hotaru Tsukamoto; Miu Goto; Haruka Sumitani
Philippines	Singapore	South Korea	Thailand
Danica Aquino; Skylynne Ellazar; Ann Antolihao; Cheska Altomonte; Mae Langga; Charlotte Sales; Reyae Villamin; Elsie Dela Torre; Royevel Palma; Nicole Hammoude; Alaiza Talisik; Cristy Roa; Mary Joy Maguad; Angelu Gabriel; Aliza Pichon; Celyn Ojare; Glory Alonzo	Teresa Chua; Charlize Goh; Bowie Tan; Cacia Tan; Charmaine Chua; Dawn Toh; Lexguas Ho; Naomi Leow; Liow Wan Yu; Joleen Teo; Janice Tan; Shanice Lim; Rachel Yoong; Rachel Kho; Adelia Koh; Guo Rundongni; Ng Jing Yi	Kim Ah-young; Choe Ha-na; Hong Si-yeon; Lee Min-jeong; Lee Bo-hyeon; Choi Ga-hyun; Jang Se-jin; Lee Kyung-min; Seol Ga-eun; Jin Ju-i; Kim Go-eun; Lee Ye-rin; Kim Su-bin; Bae Yu-ka; Lim Geum-hee; Jung Song-hee; Park Min-kyoung	Atjima Kummoo; Jirarak Kako; Supatra Thainoy; Ancheera Sirimaha; Sudarat Wiangkhamfa; Thanaporn Tipdee; Nattaporn Techanan; Mechawee Thanachanthonwaj; Waraporn Konyuen; Yanisa Suwannaree; Thanyathon Singhaampon; Meentra Chokkhachonphaisan; Wannaporn Nutsawast; Nannapas Wattaprom; Thirayu Sakcharoenchaikun; Rungarun Saeyang

== Results ==
All times are China Standard Time (UTC+08:00)

=== Preliminary round robin ===
==== Group A ====
Pos	Team	Pld	W	L	RF	RA	PCT	GB	Qualification
1	Japan	3	3	0	30	3	1.000	—	Super round
2	Chinese Taipei	3	2	1	25	5	.667	1	Super round
3	Singapore	3	1	2	9	29	.333	2	Placement round
4	Hong Kong	3	0	3	4	31	.000	3	Placement round

Source: OCA

26 September; 11:30	Singapore	0–12 (F/4)	Chinese Taipei	Baseball & Softball Sports Center, Shaoxing; Attendance: 200; Umpires: Cho Hee-young (KOR)
26 September; 11:30	LP: Charlize Goh	Boxscore	WP: Tu Ya-ting	Baseball & Softball Sports Center, Shaoxing; Attendance: 200; Umpires: Cho Hee-young (KOR)

Team	1	2	3	4	5	6	7	R	H	E
Singapore	0	0	0	0	—	—	—	0	1	5
Chinese Taipei	3	3	6	X	—	—	—	12	9	0

26 September; 15:30	Hong Kong	0–12 (F/4)	Japan	Baseball & Softball Sports Center, Shaoxing; Attendance: 300; Umpires: Wittaya Jumpagorn (THA)
26 September; 15:30	LP: Lau Suet Man	Boxscore	WP: Misaki Katsumata	Baseball & Softball Sports Center, Shaoxing; Attendance: 300; Umpires: Wittaya Jumpagorn (THA)
26 September; 15:30		Boxscore	HR: Hitomi Kawabata (1), Ayane Nakagawa (1), Yui Sakamoto (1)	Baseball & Softball Sports Center, Shaoxing; Attendance: 300; Umpires: Wittaya Jumpagorn (THA)

Team	1	2	3	4	5	6	7	R	H	E
Hong Kong	0	0	0	0	—	—	—	0	0	1
Japan	5	5	2	X	—	—	—	12	12	0

27 September; 9:00	Hong Kong	4–9	Singapore	Baseball & Softball Sports Center, Shaoxing; Attendance: 500; Umpires: Yu Ko-chin (TPE)
27 September; 9:00	LP: Hui Kai Yan	Boxscore	WP: Ng Jing Yi; Sv: Charlize Goh	Baseball & Softball Sports Center, Shaoxing; Attendance: 500; Umpires: Yu Ko-chin (TPE)

Team	1	2	3	4	5	6	7	R	H	E
Hong Kong	1	2	0	0	1	0	0	4	9	3
Singapore	6	0	0	0	1	2	X	9	12	2

27 September; 15:30	Chinese Taipei	3–5 (F/8)	Japan	Baseball & Softball Sports Center, Shaoxing; Attendance: 1,000; Umpires: Leonardo Belgar (PHI)
27 September; 15:30	LP: Ke Hsia-ai	Boxscore	WP: Yukiko Ueno	Baseball & Softball Sports Center, Shaoxing; Attendance: 1,000; Umpires: Leonardo Belgar (PHI)
27 September; 15:30		Boxscore	HR: Ayane Nakagawa (1), Yui Nakamizo (1)	Baseball & Softball Sports Center, Shaoxing; Attendance: 1,000; Umpires: Leonardo Belgar (PHI)

Team	1	2	3	4	5	6	7	8	R	H	E
Chinese Taipei	0	0	0	0	0	2	0	1	3	6	0
Japan	1	0	0	0	0	1	0	3	5	5	1

28 September; 9:00	Singapore	0–13 (F/4)	Japan	Baseball & Softball Sports Center, Shaoxing; Attendance: 1,000; Umpires: Wang Show-ling (TPE)
28 September; 9:00	LP: Rachel Yoong	Boxscore	WP: Misaki Katsumata	Baseball & Softball Sports Center, Shaoxing; Attendance: 1,000; Umpires: Wang Show-ling (TPE)
28 September; 9:00		Boxscore	HR: Nodoka Harada (2), Haruka Sumitani (1)	Baseball & Softball Sports Center, Shaoxing; Attendance: 1,000; Umpires: Wang Show-ling (TPE)

Team	1	2	3	4	5	6	7	R	H	E
Singapore	0	0	0	0	—	—	—	0	1	4
Japan	3	1	9	X	—	—	—	13	12	0

28 September; 15:30	Hong Kong	0–10 (F/4)	Chinese Taipei	Baseball & Softball Sports Center, Shaoxing; Attendance: 200; Umpires: Katsuhiro Tanaka (JPN)
28 September; 15:30	LP: Lo Wing Yan	Boxscore	WP: Chen Ching-yu	Baseball & Softball Sports Center, Shaoxing; Attendance: 200; Umpires: Katsuhiro Tanaka (JPN)
28 September; 15:30		Boxscore	HR: Chen Chia-yi (1), Shen Chia-wen (1)	Baseball & Softball Sports Center, Shaoxing; Attendance: 200; Umpires: Katsuhiro Tanaka (JPN)

Team	1	2	3	4	5	6	7	R	H	E
Hong Kong	0	0	0	0	—	—	—	0	1	2
Chinese Taipei	0	9	1	X	—	—	—	10	10	0

==== Group B ====
Pos	Team	Pld	W	L	RF	RA	PCT	GB	Qualification
1	China	3	3	0	24	0	1.000	—	Super round
2	Philippines	3	2	1	16	7	.667	1	Super round
3	South Korea	3	1	2	10	15	.333	2	Placement round
4	Thailand	3	0	3	1	29	.000	3	Placement round

Source: OCA

26 September; 9:00	Philippines	11–0 (F/4)	Thailand	Baseball & Softball Sports Center, Shaoxing; Attendance: 500; Umpires: Nong Junchuan (CHN)
26 September; 9:00	WP: Glory Alonzo	Boxscore	LP: Yanisa Suwannaree	Baseball & Softball Sports Center, Shaoxing; Attendance: 500; Umpires: Nong Junchuan (CHN)

Team	1	2	3	4	5	6	7	R	H	E
Philippines	5	2	4	0	—	—	—	11	14	0
Thailand	0	0	0	0	—	—	—	0	2	2

26 September; 19:00	China	9–0 (F/5)	South Korea	Baseball & Softball Sports Center, Shaoxing; Attendance: 500; Umpires: Kaori Yoshinaga (JPN)
26 September; 19:00	WP: Chai Yinan; Sv: Wang Lan	Boxscore	LP: Hong Si-yeon	Baseball & Softball Sports Center, Shaoxing; Attendance: 500; Umpires: Kaori Yoshinaga (JPN)
26 September; 19:00	HR: Xi Kailin (1), Ren Min (1)	Boxscore		Baseball & Softball Sports Center, Shaoxing; Attendance: 500; Umpires: Kaori Yoshinaga (JPN)

Team	1	2	3	4	5	6	7	R	H	E
China	5	2	0	0	2	—	—	9	8	0
South Korea	0	0	0	0	0	—	—	0	3	1

27 September; 11:30	Thailand	1–10 (F/5)	South Korea	Baseball & Softball Sports Center, Shaoxing; Attendance: 400; Umpires: Zhang Zhemin (CHN)
27 September; 11:30	LP: Yanisa Suwannaree	Boxscore	WP: Lee Ye-rin	Baseball & Softball Sports Center, Shaoxing; Attendance: 400; Umpires: Zhang Zhemin (CHN)

Team	1	2	3	4	5	6	7	R	H	E
Thailand	1	0	0	0	0	—	—	1	4	2
South Korea	3	4	3	0	X	—	—	10	10	0

27 September; 19:00	Philippines	0–7 (F/5)	China	Baseball & Softball Sports Center, Shaoxing; Attendance: 1,300; Umpires: Miki Yabe (JPN)
27 September; 19:00	LP: Glory Alonzo	Boxscore	WP: Chai Yinan	Baseball & Softball Sports Center, Shaoxing; Attendance: 1,300; Umpires: Miki Yabe (JPN)
27 September; 19:00		Boxscore	HR: Ren Min (1)	Baseball & Softball Sports Center, Shaoxing; Attendance: 1,300; Umpires: Miki Yabe (JPN)

Team	1	2	3	4	5	6	7	R	H	E
Philippines	0	0	0	0	0	—	—	0	1	2
China	3	0	3	1	X	—	—	7	7	1

28 September; 11:30	South Korea	0–5	Philippines	Baseball & Softball Sports Center, Shaoxing; Attendance: 500; Umpires: Xie Xin (CHN)
28 September; 11:30	LP: Park Min-kyoung	Boxscore	WP: Royevel Palma	Baseball & Softball Sports Center, Shaoxing; Attendance: 500; Umpires: Xie Xin (CHN)
28 September; 11:30		Boxscore	HR: Cristy Roa (1)	Baseball & Softball Sports Center, Shaoxing; Attendance: 500; Umpires: Xie Xin (CHN)

Team	1	2	3	4	5	6	7	R	H	E
South Korea	0	0	0	0	0	0	0	0	1	1
Philippines	0	0	0	1	0	4	X	5	11	0

28 September; 19:00	Thailand	0–8 (F/5)	China	Baseball & Softball Sports Center, Shaoxing; Attendance: 1,000; Umpires: Han Sung-sik (KOR)
28 September; 19:00	LP: Sudarat Wiangkhamfa	Boxscore	WP: Wang Lan	Baseball & Softball Sports Center, Shaoxing; Attendance: 1,000; Umpires: Han Sung-sik (KOR)
28 September; 19:00		Boxscore	HR: Xie Yue (1), Chen Jia (1)	Baseball & Softball Sports Center, Shaoxing; Attendance: 1,000; Umpires: Han Sung-sik (KOR)

Team	1	2	3	4	5	6	7	R	H	E
Thailand	0	0	0	0	0	—	—	0	0	0
China	5	2	0	1	X	—	—	8	7	0

=== Placement round ===
- The results of the matches between the same teams that were already played during the preliminary round robin shall be taken into account for the placement round.

Pos	Team	Pld	W	L	RF	RA	PCT	GB
1	South Korea	3	3	0	23	3	1.000	—
2	Singapore	3	2	1	27	7	.667	1
3	Hong Kong	3	1	2	8	21	.333	2
4	Thailand	3	0	3	3	30	.000	3

Source: OCA

29 September; 11:30	Thailand	1–17 (F/3)	Singapore	Baseball & Softball Sports Center, Shaoxing; Attendance: 200; Umpires: Yu Zhiling (CHN)
29 September; 11:30	LP: Yanisa Suwannaree	Boxscore	WP: Charlize Goh	Baseball & Softball Sports Center, Shaoxing; Attendance: 200; Umpires: Yu Zhiling (CHN)

Team	1	2	3	4	5	6	7	R	H	E
Thailand	1	0	0	—	—	—	—	1	1	2
Singapore	7	10	X	—	—	—	—	17	13	3

29 September; 15:30	Hong Kong	1–11 (F/4)	South Korea	Baseball & Softball Sports Center, Shaoxing; Attendance: 200; Umpires: Lin Yu-sung (TPE)
29 September; 15:30	LP: Hui Kai Yan	Boxscore	WP: Lee Ye-rin	Baseball & Softball Sports Center, Shaoxing; Attendance: 200; Umpires: Lin Yu-sung (TPE)

Team	1	2	3	4	5	6	7	R	H	E
Hong Kong	0	0	0	1	—	—	—	1	5	1
South Korea	1	1	2	7	—	—	—	11	8	2

30 September; 9:00	Thailand	1–3	Hong Kong	Baseball & Softball Sports Center, Shaoxing; Attendance: 700; Umpires: Chen Jun (CHN)
30 September; 9:00	LP: Yanisa Suwannaree	Boxscore	WP: Lau Suet Man; Sv: Hui Kai Yan	Baseball & Softball Sports Center, Shaoxing; Attendance: 700; Umpires: Chen Jun (CHN)

Team	1	2	3	4	5	6	7	R	H	E
Thailand	0	0	0	0	0	0	1	1	7	0
Hong Kong	0	0	3	0	0	0	X	3	3	3

30 September; 11:30	Singapore	1–2	South Korea	Baseball & Softball Sports Center, Shaoxing; Attendance: 200; Umpires: Cheng Hong (CHN)
30 September; 11:30	LP: Adelia Koh	Boxscore	WP: Hong Si-yeon	Baseball & Softball Sports Center, Shaoxing; Attendance: 200; Umpires: Cheng Hong (CHN)

Team	1	2	3	4	5	6	7	R	H	E
Singapore	0	0	0	0	1	0	0	1	9	1
South Korea	0	1	0	0	0	1	X	2	5	0

=== Super round ===
- The results of the matches between the same teams that were already played during the preliminary round robin shall be taken into account for the super round.

Pos	Team	Pld	W	L	RF	RA	PCT	GB	Qualification
1	Japan	3	3	0	15	5	1.000	—	Gold medal
2	China	3	2	1	8	1	.667	1	Gold medal
3	Chinese Taipei	3	1	2	9	10	.333	2	Bronze medal
4	Philippines	3	0	3	6	22	.000	3	Bronze medal

Source: OCA

29 September; 9:00	Philippines	2–9 (F/6)	Japan	Baseball & Softball Sports Center, Shaoxing; Attendance: 200; Umpires: Ge Lan (CHN)
29 September; 9:00	LP: Ann Antolihao	Boxscore	WP: Yukiko Ueno	Baseball & Softball Sports Center, Shaoxing; Attendance: 200; Umpires: Ge Lan (CHN)
29 September; 9:00		Boxscore	HR: Kanna Kudo (1), Yui Nakamizo (1), Ayane Nakagawa (1)	Baseball & Softball Sports Center, Shaoxing; Attendance: 200; Umpires: Ge Lan (CHN)

Team	1	2	3	4	5	6	7	R	H	E
Philippines	0	2	0	0	0	0	—	2	7	1
Japan	3	0	0	0	2	4	—	9	14	0

29 September; 19:00	Chinese Taipei	0–1 (F/8)	China	Baseball & Softball Sports Center, Shaoxing; Attendance: 1,300; Umpires: Katsuhiro Tanaka (JPN)
29 September; 19:00	LP: Ke Hsia-ai	Boxscore	WP: Chai Yinan	Baseball & Softball Sports Center, Shaoxing; Attendance: 1,300; Umpires: Katsuhiro Tanaka (JPN)

Team	1	2	3	4	5	6	7	8	R	H	E
Chinese Taipei	0	0	0	0	0	0	0	0	0	4	0
China	0	0	0	0	0	0	0	1	1	7	1

30 September; 15:30	Philippines	4–6	Chinese Taipei	Baseball & Softball Sports Center, Shaoxing; Attendance: 900; Umpires: Katsuhiro Tanaka (JPN)
30 September; 15:30	LP: Ann Antolihao	Boxscore	WP: Chiu An-ju; Sv: Ke Hsia-ai	Baseball & Softball Sports Center, Shaoxing; Attendance: 900; Umpires: Katsuhiro Tanaka (JPN)

Team	1	2	3	4	5	6	7	R	H	E
Philippines	0	0	1	0	2	1	0	4	10	2
Chinese Taipei	2	1	0	0	1	2	X	6	12	1

30 September; 19:00	Japan	1–0	China	Baseball & Softball Sports Center, Shaoxing; Attendance: 1,200; Umpires: Wittaya Jumpagorn (THA)
30 September; 19:00	WP: Misaki Katsumata; Sv: Miu Goto	Boxscore	LP: Wang Lan	Baseball & Softball Sports Center, Shaoxing; Attendance: 1,200; Umpires: Wittaya Jumpagorn (THA)
30 September; 19:00	HR: Kanna Kudo (1)	Boxscore		Baseball & Softball Sports Center, Shaoxing; Attendance: 1,200; Umpires: Wittaya Jumpagorn (THA)

Team	1	2	3	4	5	6	7	R	H	E
Japan	0	0	0	0	0	1	0	1	5	0
China	0	0	0	0	0	0	0	0	5	3

=== Final round ===
==== Bronze medal ====
2 October; 15:00	Philippines	2–3	Chinese Taipei	Baseball & Softball Sports Center, Shaoxing; Attendance: 1,000; Umpires: Miki Yabe (JPN)
2 October; 15:00	LP: Royevel Palma	Boxscore	WP: Ke Hsia-ai; Sv: Chiu An-ju	Baseball & Softball Sports Center, Shaoxing; Attendance: 1,000; Umpires: Miki Yabe (JPN)
2 October; 15:00		Boxscore	HR: Lin Feng-chen (1)	Baseball & Softball Sports Center, Shaoxing; Attendance: 1,000; Umpires: Miki Yabe (JPN)

Team	1	2	3	4	5	6	7	R	H	E
Philippines	0	0	1	0	0	0	1	2	8	0
Chinese Taipei	0	0	1	0	2	0	X	3	5	1

==== Gold medal ====
2 October; 18:00	China	0–4	Japan	Baseball & Softball Sports Center, Shaoxing; Attendance: 1,300; Umpires: Cho Hee-young (KOR)
2 October; 18:00	LP: Chai Yinan	Boxscore	WP: Miu Goto; Sv: Yukiko Ueno	Baseball & Softball Sports Center, Shaoxing; Attendance: 1,300; Umpires: Cho Hee-young (KOR)
2 October; 18:00		Boxscore	HR: Minori Naito (1)	Baseball & Softball Sports Center, Shaoxing; Attendance: 1,300; Umpires: Cho Hee-young (KOR)

Team	1	2	3	4	5	6	7	R	H	E
China	0	0	0	0	0	0	0	0	7	2
Japan	2	0	0	0	0	2	X	4	4	0

== Final standing ==
Rank	Team	Pld	W	L
1st place, gold medalist(s)	Japan	6	6	0
2nd place, silver medalist(s)	China	6	4	2
3rd place, bronze medalist(s)	Chinese Taipei	6	4	2
4	Philippines	6	2	4
5	South Korea	5	3	2
6	Singapore	5	2	3
7	Hong Kong	5	1	4
8	Thailand	5	0	5
