= Shiho Suto =

Japanese softball player

Toyota Industries Shokki – No. 4
- Infielder
- Born: 12 January 1999 (age 27); Hirosaki, Aomori, Japan
- Bats: Left Throws: Right
Medals
Women's softball
Representing Japan
World Cup
| Gold medal – first place | 2024 Castions di Strada | Team |
Asian Games
| Gold medal – first place | 2026 Aichi–Nagoya | Team |

Shiho Suto (Japanese: 須藤 志歩; born 12 January 1999) is a Japanese softball player who plays as an infielder for Toyota Industries Shokki and the Japan women's national softball team. She represented Japan at the 2024 Women's Softball World Cup and the 2026 Asian Games, winning gold medals at both competitions.

== Career ==
Suto was born in Hirosaki, Aomori Prefecture, Japan. She attended Hirosaki Gakuin Seiai High School and joined Toyota Industries Shokki in April 2017. She plays as an infielder, bats left-handed and throws right-handed.

Suto represented Japan at the 2017 Junior Women's Softball World Championship. She was included in Japan's roster for the tournament, which was documented in the World Baseball Softball Confederation's official competition records.

In domestic competition, Suto has played in Japan's top-level women's softball league. In the 2023 Japan Diamond Softball League season, she recorded a .322 batting average, 29 hits, eight home runs and 20 runs batted in across 28 games. She was named to the league's Western Division Best Nine once.

Suto was selected for Japan's squad at the 2024 Women's Softball World Cup Finals in Italy. Japan defeated the United States 6–1 in the final to win the championship. Suto was listed as an infielder on the Japanese roster for the tournament.

In 2026, Suto was a member of the Japan women's national softball team that won the gold medal at the Asian Games in Aichi and Nagoya.
