= Risa Kawamura =

Japanese softball player

Bic Camera Takasaki Bee Queen
- Outfielder
- Born: 31 January 2000 (age 26); Japan
- Bats: Left Throws: Right
Medals
Women's softball
Representing Japan
Asian Games
| Gold medal – first place | 2022 Hangzhou | Team |
| Gold medal – first place | 2026 Aichi–Nagoya | Team |

Risa Kawamura (Japanese: 川村 莉沙, Kawamura Risa; born 31 January 2000) is a Japanese softball player who plays as an outfielder for Bic Camera Takasaki Bee Queen and the Japan women's national softball team. She won gold medals in the women's softball tournament at the 2022 Asian Games and the 2026 Asian Games.

== Career ==
Kawamura attended Soshi Gakuen High School in Okayama Prefecture. She began her senior club career with Denso Bright Pegasus before joining Bic Camera Takasaki Bee Queen. She plays as an outfielder, bats left-handed and throws right-handed.

Kawamura represented Japan at the 2022 Asian Games, held in Hangzhou in 2023 after being postponed because of the COVID-19 pandemic. Japan won the women's softball tournament, defeating China in the final to secure the gold medal. Kawamura was part of the Japanese squad for the competition.

Kawamura continued to represent Japan in international competition and was selected for the women's national team at the 2026 Asian Games in Aichi and Nagoya. She played in the outfield during the tournament and contributed offensively in the preliminary round. Against Chinese Taipei, she hit a run-scoring single that helped Japan take the lead in a 4–2 victory. In the final against China on 3 October 2026, she hit a double as Japan won 7–0 in five innings.

Japan finished the 2026 Asian Games preliminary round undefeated and defeated China in the gold-medal game, securing its seventh consecutive Asian Games title in women's softball. Kawamura's performance in the tournament earned her a second Asian Games gold medal.
