= Eri Shimoyama =

Japanese softball player

Toyota Red Terriers
- Infielder
- Born: December 26, 1998 (age 27); Kōchi Prefecture, Japan
- Bats: Right Throws: Right
Medals
Women's softball
Representing Japan
World Cup
Gold medal – first place	2024 Castions di Strada	Team
Asian Games
Gold medal – first place	2026 Aichi–Nagoya	Team

Eri Shimoyama (Japanese: 下山 絵理; born 26 December 1998) is a Japanese softball player who plays as an infielder for the Toyota Red Terriers and the Japan women's national softball team. She has competed in international tournaments, including the 2024 Women's Softball World Cup and the 2026 Asian Games.

== Career ==
Shimoyama was born in Kōchi Prefecture, Japan. She attended Kōchi Marunouchi High School and later studied at Sonoda Women's University. She played collegiate softball and was part of teams that finished as runners-up at the All-Japan University Softball Championship during her first three years at university.

Shimoyama joined the Toyota Red Terriers, the women's softball team operated by Toyota Motor Corporation, after completing university. She plays as an infielder and bats and throws right-handed. In the Japan Diamond Softball League, she has won the Western Division home run and runs batted in titles and received a Best Nine selection.

Shimoyama represented Japan at the 2017 junior international level before progressing to the senior national team. She was selected for Japan's squad for the 2023 Women's Softball Asia Cup and the 2024 Women's Softball World Cup.

At the 2024 Women's Softball World Cup Finals in Italy, Shimoyama played at first base for Japan. In the opening game against Australia, she hit a run-scoring double that helped Japan win 3–0. Japan advanced to the championship final and defeated the United States 6–1 to win the tournament. Shimoyama started at first base in the final.

Shimoyama was selected for Japan's softball team at the 2026 Asian Games in Aichi and Nagoya. Before the tournament, she said she aimed to contribute to Japan's pursuit of a seventh consecutive Asian Games title through her batting.

During Japan's preliminary-round game against Singapore on 30 September 2026, Shimoyama hit a double as Japan won 10–0 in four innings. Japan went on to defeat China 7–0 in the final on 3 October, winning the gold medal.
