= Sakura Miwa =

Japanese softball player

SHIONOGI – No. 39
- Pitcher
- Born: 1 October 1998 (age 28); Aichi Prefecture, Japan
- Bats: Right Throws: Right
Medals
Softball
Representing Japan
World Cup
Gold medal – first place	2024 Castions di Strada	Team
Asian Games
Gold medal – first place	2022 Hangzhou	Team
Gold medal – first place	2026 Aichi–Nagoya	Team
World Games
Silver medal – second place	2022 Birmingham	Team

Sakura Miwa (Japanese: 三輪 さくら; born 1 October 1998) is a Japanese softball pitcher who plays for SHIONOGI in the Japan Diamond Softball League and represents Japan internationally. She has won gold medals at the Asian Games and the Women's Softball World Cup and a silver medal at the World Games.

== Career ==
Miwa was born in Aichi Prefecture, Japan, and attended Seijō High School. She joined Toyota Motor Corporation's women's softball team in 2017 and played for the Toyota Red Terriers through 2023. In 2024, she joined SHIONOGI, where she continued her career as a pitcher.

Miwa represented Japan at the 2017 Junior Women's Softball World Championship. She later joined the senior national team and competed at the 2022 World Games in Birmingham, Alabama, where Japan won the silver medal in women's softball.

At the 2022 Asian Games in Hangzhou, held in 2023, Miwa was part of the Japanese team that won the gold medal in women's softball. She also represented Japan at the 2023 Women's Softball World Cup Group Stage.

In July 2024, Miwa played for Japan at the Women's Softball World Cup Finals in Italy. She started against Puerto Rico in the preliminary round, pitching three scoreless innings in an 8–0 victory. Japan went on to defeat the United States 6–1 in the final to win the world championship.

During the 2024 Japan Diamond Softball League season, Miwa recorded 19 wins and seven losses and received the league's Most Wins Pitcher award in the Western Division. She was also selected to the division's Best Nine as a pitcher.

In 2026, Miwa represented Japan at the Asian Games in Aichi and Nagoya. She pitched in the preliminary round, including Japan's 15–0 victory over Thailand and its 10–0 win over Singapore. Japan defeated China 7–0 in the final to win the gold medal, its seventh consecutive Asian Games title.
