= Urara Fujimoto =

Japanese softball player

Bic Camera Takasaki Bee Queen – No. 1
- Outfielder
- Born: 12 January 1999 (age 27); Hiroshima Prefecture, Japan
- Bats: Left Throws: Right
Medals
Women's softball
Representing Japan
Women's Softball World Cup
Gold medal – first place	2024 Castions di Strada	Team
World Games
Silver medal – second place	2025 Chengdu	Team
Asian Games
Gold medal – first place	2026 Aichi–Nagoya	Team

Urara Fujimoto (Japanese: 藤本 麗, Fujimoto Urara; born 12 January 1999) is a Japanese softball player who plays as an outfielder for Bic Camera Takasaki Bee Queen and the Japan women's national softball team. She won gold medals at the 2024 Women's Softball World Cup and the 2026 Asian Games, and a silver medal at the 2025 World Games.

== Career ==
Fujimoto attended Hyogo University-affiliated Sumanoura High School in Hyogo Prefecture. She joined Bic Camera Takasaki Bee Queen, competing in Japan's domestic women's softball league. She plays as an outfielder, bats left-handed and throws right-handed.

Fujimoto represented Japan at the 2017 Junior Women's Softball World Championship. She later became a member of the senior national team and was selected for Japan's squad at the 2024 Women's Softball World Cup final stage in Castions di Strada, Italy. Japan defeated the United States 6–1 in the final on 21 July 2024 to win the world championship.

In August 2025, Fujimoto competed for Japan at the 2025 World Games in Chengdu, China. Japan finished second in the women's softball competition, earning the silver medal. Fujimoto was included in the Japanese delegation for the tournament alongside other members of the national team.

Fujimoto represented Japan at the 2026 Asian Games in Aichi and Nagoya. Japan finished the preliminary round undefeated and advanced to the gold-medal game against China on 3 October 2026. Fujimoto started in right field in the final and hit a two-run single in the fifth inning, helping Japan secure a 7–0 victory under the tournament's run-difference rule. The win gave Japan its seventh consecutive Asian Games gold medal in women's softball.
