= Mio Sakamoto (softball) =

Japanese softball player

Hitachi SunDiva – No. 18
- Pitcher
- Born: 16 June 2000 (age 26); Hiroshima Prefecture, Japan
- Bats: Right Throws: Right
Medals
Women's softball
Representing Japan
World Cup
Gold medal – first place	2024 Castions di Strada	Team
Asian Games
Gold medal – first place	2026 Aichi–Nagoya	Team

Mio Sakamoto (Japanese: 坂本 実桜; born 16 June 2000) is a Japanese softball player who plays as a pitcher for Hitachi SunDiva in the Japan Diamond Softball League and the Japan women's national softball team. She was a member of the Japanese team that won the 2024 Women's Softball World Cup and the gold medal at the 2026 Asian Games.

== Career ==
Sakamoto was born in Hiroshima Prefecture, Japan, and attended Sōshi Gakuen High School in Okayama Prefecture. She plays as a right-handed pitcher and represents Hitachi SunDiva in Japan's top-level women's softball league. During the 2022 season, she recorded nine wins and two losses with a 1.12 earned run average. In 2024, she recorded nine wins and one loss with a 1.53 earned run average.

Sakamoto represented Japan at the 2019 Junior Women's Softball World Championship. She later joined the senior national team and was selected for the 2024 Women's Softball World Cup Finals in Italy.

At the 2024 Women's Softball World Cup Finals, Sakamoto was part of the Japanese team that won the championship. Japan defeated the United States 6–1 in the final to secure its fourth world title.

In 2026, Sakamoto represented Japan at the Asian Games in Aichi and Nagoya. She pitched in the preliminary round, including Japan's 15–0 victory over Hong Kong, in which she pitched three innings. Japan defeated China 7–0 in the final on 3 October to win the gold medal.
