= Softball in Queensland =

Softball is played in Queensland.

== History and governance ==
Softball saw a "benefit" in the bombing of Darwin and the inclusion of Australia in World War II in terms of bringing in American military personnel who brought softball with them to this state. Local competitions were organised by Mack Gilley in the state by 1946. A Queensland organisation was created in 1946 by the American Mack Gilley. The state federation was one of the foundation federation members of the Australian Women's Softball Council in 1949. In 1971, there were 171 teams affiliated with the state organisation, 290 in 1975, 326 in 1976, 538 in 1977, 504 in 1978, 786 in 1983 and 951 in 1984. The state association is involved with Softball Australia's Play Ball programme and is working to increase junior participation in the sport in their state.

== National champions ==
=== Gilleys Shield ===
In 1947, Queensland, New South Wales and Victoria participated in the first interstate softball competition in the country. The competition was eventually called the Mack Gilley Shield. Queensland won the Mack Gilley Shield in 1963, 1966 and 1968. They won again in 1975, 1983, 1984, 1987, 1992 and 1994. In 2012, Queensland finished third in the Gilley Shield. The state hosted the Mack Gilley Shield in Brisbane in 1947, 1953, 1959 and 1966. Women's open team members who represented Queensland at the 2008 Mack Gilley Shield include Jodie Bowering and Jocelyn McCallum. Women's open team members who represented Queensland at the 2012 Mack Gilley Shield include Jodie Bowering.

=== John Reid Shield ===
Queensland competed in the John Reid Shield in 2012. Men's national team member William Bailey played for Queensland in the competition.

== Players from Queensland ==
=== National team representatives ===
Members of the 1965 Australian national team from Queensland included Brisbane based Lorraine Woolley, who competed at the World Championships in 1965 and was named the player of the tournament. Members of the 2012 Australia women's national softball team from Queensland include Jodie Bowering and Jocelyn McCallum.

=== Australian Institute of Sport scholarship holders ===
The Australian Institute of Sport first awarded softball scholarships in 1993, after the 1991 announcement that softball would be included on the programme for the 1996 Summer Olympics. Since then, several competitors from this state have been awarded scholarships including Kim Cooper, Carolyn Crudgington, Tanya Harding, Joyce Lester, Francine McRae, Haylea Petrie, Nicole Rose and Linda Ward who all had scholarships in the programme's inaugural year.

=== American university players ===
Some softball players from this state have played softball for American universities, which depleted the level of high quality players available for local, state and international competitions. They include Kellie McKellar who played for Oklahoma City University starting in 1993, Michelle Moores who played for Barton Community College starting in 1993, and Tanya Harding who played for the University of California at Los Angeles starting in 1995.

== Facilities ==
Brisbane was the home to Australia's first international competition ready softball diamond, complete with lights. It was built in 1980.

== See also ==
- Softball Australia
- Softball in Australia
