= Australia at the 1996 Summer Olympics =

- IOC code: AUS
- NOC: Australian Olympic Committee
- Website: www.olympics.com.au

in Atlanta
- Competitors: 417 (250 men, 167 women) in 26 sports
- Flag bearers: Andrew Hoy (opening); Mike McKay (closing)
- Medals Ranked 7th: Gold 9 Silver 9 Bronze 23 Total 41

Summer Olympics appearances (overview)
- 1896; 1900; 1904; 1908; 1912; 1920; 1924; 1928; 1932; 1936; 1948; 1952; 1956; 1960; 1964; 1968; 1972; 1976; 1980; 1984; 1988; 1992; 1996; 2000; 2004; 2008; 2012; 2016; 2020; 2024

Other related appearances
- 1906 Intercalated Games –––– Australasia (1908–1912)

Australia competed at the 1996 Summer Olympics in Atlanta, United States. Australia sent 417 athletes, 250 men and 167 women, to the Atlanta Games.

An Australian segment was featured in the closing ceremony, as Australia was to host the next edition of the Summer Olympics in Sydney four years later.

== Medalists ==
=== Gold ===
- Wendy Schaeffer, Phillip Dutton, Andrew Hoy, and Gillian Rolton — equestrian, three-day event team competition
- Michelle Andrews, Alyson Annan, Louise Dobson, Renita Farrell, Juliet Haslam, Rechelle Hawkes, Clover Maitland, Karen Marsden, Jenn Morris, Nova Peris-Kneebone, Jackie Pereira, Katrina Powell, Lisa Powell, Danni Roche, Kate Starre, and Liane Tooth — field hockey, women's tournament
- James Tomkins, Drew Ginn, Nicholas Green, and Mike McKay — rowing, men's coxless fours
- Kate Slatter and Megan Still — rowing, women's coxless pairs
- Michael Diamond — shooting, men's trap shooting
- Russell Mark — shooting, men's double trap
- Kieren Perkins — swimming, men's 1500m freestyle
- Susie O'Neill — swimming, women's 200m butterfly
- Todd Woodbridge and Mark Woodforde — tennis, men's doubles

=== Silver ===
- Cathy Freeman — athletics, women's 400 metres
- Louise McPaul — athletics, women's javelin throw
- Michelle Ferris — cycling, women's sprint
- Rob Scott and David Weightman — rowing, men's coxless pairs
- Daniel Kowalski — swimming, men's 1500m freestyle
- Scott Miller — swimming, men's 100m butterfly
- Petria Thomas — swimming, women's 200m butterfly
- Nicole Stevenson, Susie O'Neill, Samantha Riley, Sarah Ryan, Helen Denman (heats), and Angela Kennedy (heats) — swimming, women's 4 × 100 m medley relay
- Mitch Booth and Andrew Landenberger — sailing, men's Tornado

=== Bronze ===
- Michele Timms, Allison Tranquilli, Jenny Whittle, Fiona Robinson, Shelley Sandie, Rachael Sporn, Michelle Chandler, Trisha Fallon, Robyn Maher, Carla Boyd, Michelle Brogan, and Sandy Brondello — basketball, women's tournament
- Clint Robinson — canoeing, men's K1 1000m kayak singles
- Danny Collins and Andrew Trim — canoeing, men's 500m kayak pairs
- Katrin Borchert and Anna Wood — canoeing, women's K2 500m kayak pairs
- Bradley McGee — cycling, men's 4000m individual pursuit
- Bradley McGee, Stuart O'Grady, Tim O'Shannessey, and Dean Woods — cycling, men's 4000m team pursuit
- Stuart O'Grady — cycling, men's points race
- Lucy Tyler-Sharman — cycling, women's points race
- Stuart Carruthers, Baeden Choppy, Stephen Davies, Damon Diletti, Lachlan Dreher, Lachlan Elmer, Brendan Garard, Paul Gaudoin, Mark Hager, Paul Lewis, Grant Smith, Matthew Smith, Daniel Sproule, Jay Stacy, Michael York and Ken Wark — field hockey, men's tournament
- Ronald Snook, Duncan Free, Bo Hanson, and Janusz Hooker — rowing, men's quadruple sculls
- Anthony Edwards and Bruce Hick — rowing, men's lwt double scull
- Rebecca Joyce and Virginia Lee — rowing, women's lwt double scull
- Deserie Huddleston — shooting, women's double trap
- Natalie Ward, Brooke Wilkins, Nicole Richardson, Melanie Roche, Natalie Titcume, Malina Milson, Tracey Mosley, Haylea Petrie, Joyce Lester, Sally McDermid, Francine McRae, Suzanne Fairhurst, Tanya Harding, Jennifer Holliday, Carolyn Crudgington, Kerry Dienelt, Peta Edebone, Belinda Ashworth, Joanne Brown, and Kim Cooper — softball, women's tournament
- Daniel Kowalski — swimming, men's 200m freestyle
- Daniel Kowalski — swimming, men's 400m freestyle
- Scott Goodman — swimming, men's 200m butterfly
- Phil Rogers, Steven Dewick, Scott Miller, Michael Klim, and Toby Haenen (heats) — swimming, men's 4 × 100 m medley relay
- Samantha Riley — swimming, women's 100m breaststroke
- Emma Johnson, Susie O'Neill, Julia Greville, Nicole Stevenson, and Lise Mackie (heats) — swimming, women's 4 × 200 m freestyle relay
- Natalie Cook and Kerri Ann Pottharst — volleyball, women's beach volleyball
- Stefan Botev — weightlifting, men's super heavyweight (> 108 kg)
- Colin Beashel and David Giles — Sailing, men's Star

== Archery ==
In the seventh Olympic archery competition that Australia contested, the nation sent three men and three women. Matthew Gray had the nation's only individual win, though the men's team won twice in the team round before being defeated in the semifinal and the bronze medal match.

Women's individual competition:

- Myfanwy Matthews → Round of 64, 48th place (0-1)
- Deonne Bridger → Round of 64, 57th place (0-1)

Men's individual competition:

- Matthew Gray → Round of 32, 26th place (1-1)
- Jackson Fear → Round of 64, 35th place (0-1)
- Simon Fairweather → Round of 64, 52nd place (0-1)

Men's team competition:

- Gray, Fear, and Fairweather → Bronze medal match, 4th place (2-2)

== Athletics ==
Men's 100 metres

- Rod Mapstone
  - Qualification — 10.56 (6th) (→ did not advance)
- Paul Henderson
  - Qualification — 10.52 (5th) (→ did not advance)

Men's 200 metres

- Steve Brimacombe
  - Qualification — 20.53 (3rd)
  - Semi-finals — 20.38 (5th) (→ did not advance)
- Dean Capobianco
  - Qualification — 21.03 (7th) (→ did not advance)

Men's 400 metres

- Paul Greene
  - Qualification — 46.12 (3rd)
  - Quarter-finals — 46.22 (8th) (→ did not advance)
- Mark Ladbrook
  - Qualification — 46.28 (5th) (→ did not advance)
- Michael Joubert
  - Qualification — 46.30 (5th) (→ did not advance)

Men's 800 metres

- Paul Byrne
  - Qualification — 1:47.05 (3rd)
  - Semi-Finals — 1:47.58 (6th) (→ did not advance)

Men's 1,500 metres

- Paul Cleary
  - Qualification — 3:52.85 (→ did not advance)

Men's 5,000 metres

- Shaun Creighton
  - Qualification — 14:04.08
  - Semifinal — 13:55.23 (→ did not advance)
- Julian Paynter
  - Qualification — 14:00.25
  - Semifinal — 14:23.60 (→ did not advance)

Men's 10,000 metres

- Shaun Creighton
  - Qualification — 28:44.29 (13th) (→ did not advance)

Men's 4 × 100 m relay

- Paul Henderson, Tim Jackson, Steve Brimacombe, and Rod Mapstone
  - Heat — 38.93 (1st)
  - Semi Final — 39.10DQ (→ did not advance)

Men's 4 × 400 m relay

- Mark Ladbrook, Michael Joubert, Paul Greene, and Cameron Mackenzie
  - Heat — 3:03.73
  - Semi Final — 3:04.55 (→ did not advance)

Men's 110m hurdles

- Kyle Vander Kuyp
  - Heat — 13.32 (1st)
  - Quarter-final — 13.49 (3rd)
  - Semi-final — 13.38 (4th)
  - Final — 13.40 (7th)

Men's 400m hurdles

- Rohan Robinson
  - Heat — 48.89s
  - Semi final — 48.28s
  - Final — 48.30s (→ 5th place)
- Simon Hollingsworth
  - Heat — 52.16 (→ did not advance)

Men's 3,000 metres steeplechase

- Chris Unthank
  - Heat — 8:31.86
  - Semifinals — 8:25.59 (→ did not advance)

Men's decathlon

- Peter Winter
  - Did not finish (10.85 (-0.4), NM, 13.43m)
  - DNF Decathlon after 3 no jumps in long jump
- Scott Ferrier
  - Did not finish

Men's marathon

- Steve Moneghetti — 2:14.35 (→ 7th place)
- Rod de Highden — 2:17.42 (→ 23rd place)
- Sean Quilty — 2:19.35 (→ 34th place)

Men's 20 km walk

- Nicholas A'Hern 1:20:31 (4th place)
- Dion Russell 1:30:04 (47th place)

Men's 50 km walk

- Duane Cousins — did not finish (→ no ranking)
- Simon Baker — DSQ (→ no ranking)

Men's hammer throw

- Sean Carlin
  - Qualification — 72.32m (→ did not advance)

Men's high jump

- Tim Forsyth
  - Qualification — 2.28m (1st)
  - Final — 2.32m (7th)
- Chris Anderson
  - Qualification — 2.15 (27th → did not advance)

Men's triple jump

- Andrew Murphy
  - Qualification — 16.0m (34th → did not advance)

Men's pole vault

- Simon Arkell
  - Qualification — no mark (→ did not advance)
- James Miller
  - Qualification — 5.60m (→ did not advance)

Men's javelin throw

- Andrew Currey
  - Qualification — 77.28m (→ did not advance)

Women's 10,000 metres

- Susan Hobson
  - Qualification — 32:25.13
  - Final — 32:47.71 (→ 17th place)
- Kylie Risk
  - Qualification — did not finish (→ did not advance)

Women's 4 × 400 metres relay

- Lee Naylor, Kylie Hanigan, Melinda Gainsford-Taylor, and Renee Poetschka
  - Qualification — 3:33.78 (→ did not advance)

Women's long jump

- Nicole Boegman
  - Qualification — 6.67m
  - Final — 6.73m (→ 8th place)

Women's discus throw

- Lisa-Marie Vizaniari
  - Qualification — 63.00m
  - Final — 62.48m (→ 8th place)
- Daniela Costian
  - Qualification — 61.66m (→ did not advance)

Women's javelin throw

- Louise McPaul
  - Qualification — 62.32m
  - Final — 65.54m (→ Silver medal)
- Joanna Stone
  - Qualification — 58.54m (→ did not advance)

Women's heptathlon

- Jane Jamieson
  - Final Result — 5897 points (→ 20th place)

Women's marathon

- Kerryn McCann — 2:36.41 (→ 28th place)
- Suzanne Malaxos — 2:50.46 (→ 57th place)
- Lisa Ondieki — did not finish (→ no ranking)

Women's 10 km walk

- Kerry Saxby-Junna — 43:59 (→ 12th place)
- Anne Manning — 45:27 (→ 19th place)
- Jane Saville — 45:56 (→ 26th place)

== Badminton ==
Men's singles

- Murray Hocking
  - 1st round: vs Iain Sydie (CAN) - 9-15, 9-15 - did not advance

Men's doubles

- Peter Blackburn and Paul Staight
  - 1st round: vs Stephan Beeharry and Eddy Clarisse (MRI) - 15-3, 15-7
  - 2nd round: vs Huang Zhanzhong and Jiang Xin (CHN) - 7-15, 9-15 - did not advance

Women's singles

- Lisa Campbell
  - 1st round: vs Yasuko Mizui (JPN) - 0-11, 11-8, 7-11 - did not advance
- Song Yang
  - 1st round: vs Kelly Morgan (GBR) - 1-11, 5-11 - did not advance

Women's doubles

- Rhonda Cator and Amanda Hardy
  - 1st round: vs Lili Tampi and Finarsih (INA) - 9-15, 4-15 - did not advance

Mixed doubles

- Murray Hocking and Lisa Campbell
  - 1st round: vs Tao Xiaoqiang and Wang Xiaoyuan (CHN) - 5-15, 4-15 - did not advance
- Peter Blackburn and Rhonda Cator
  - 1st round: vs Mikhail Korshuk and Vlada Chernyavskaya (BLR) - 18-14, 15-9
  - 2nd round: vs Liu Jianjun and Sun Man (CHN) - 4-15, 15-7, 4-15 - did not advance
- Paul Stevenson and Amanda Hardy
  - 1st round: vs Darryl Yung and Denyse Julien (CAN) - 9-15, 3-15 - did not advance

== Baseball ==
=== Men's tournament ===
Australia made its first appearance in the official Olympic baseball tournament in 1996. The team won two of its preliminary round games, against Korea and Japan, but lost the other five. The Australians' record put them in a three-way tie for fifth, with all three teams eliminated from contention and the tie-breaker rules used only to formally place the three teams. Australia came out on the bottom of that tie-breaker, and ended up in seventh place.

- Team roster
  - Jeff Williams
  - Mark Doubleday
  - Scott Tunkin
  - Michael Nakamura
  - Steven Hinton
  - Richard Vagg
  - Andrew Scott
  - Shane Tonkin
  - Jason Hewitt
  - Andrew McNally
  - Matthew Sheldon-Collins
  - Peter Vogler
  - David Hynes
  - Grant McDonald
  - Scott Dawes
  - Stuart Howell
  - Sten Lindberg
  - Simon Sheldon-Collins
  - Stuart Thompson
  - John Moore

== Basketball ==
=== Men's tournament ===
Preliminary round

Pos	Team	Pld	W	L	PF	PA	PD	Pts	Qualification
1	FR Yugoslavia	5	5	0	478	364	+114	10	Quarterfinals
2	Australia	5	4	1	492	438	+54	9	Quarterfinals
3	Greece	5	3	2	402	416	−14	8	Quarterfinals
4	Brazil	5	2	3	498	494	+4	7	Quarterfinals
5	Puerto Rico	5	1	4	447	465	−18	6	9th place playoff
6	South Korea	5	0	5	422	562	−140	5	11th place playoff

Source: FIBA archive
Rules for classification: 1) points; 2) head-to-head points; 3) head-to-head goal average; 4) head-to-head number of points scored.

20 July 1996

Report

Australia	111–88	South Korea
Scoring by half: 64–37, 47–51
Pts: Gaze 26; Rebs: Dorge 10; Asts: Heal 11		Pts: J. K. Jung 23; Rebs: J. K. Jung 8 Asts: D. H. Kang 8

Atlanta
Referees: Davorin Nakic (CRO), Hidetoshi Ishida (JPN)

22 July 1996

Report

FR Yugoslavia	91–68	Australia
Scoring by half: 54–28, 37–40
Pts: Obradović 18; Rebs: Rebrača, Savić 5 Asts: Danilović 6		Pts: Bradtke 18; Rebs: Gaze 7 Asts: Gaze 8

Atlanta
Referees: Wieslaw Zych (POL), Jose Reyes Ronfini (MEX)

24 July 1996

Report

Australia	109–101 (OT)	Brazil
Scoring by half: 41–46, 41–36 Overtime: 27–19
Pts: Heal 35; Rebs: Bradtke 15; Asts: Bradtke 4		Pts: Schmidt 24; Rebs: dos Santos 13; Asts: Minuci 6

Atlanta
Referees: Donald Cline (CAN), Carl Jungebrand (FIN)

26 July 1996

Report

Puerto Rico	96–101	Australia
Scoring by half: 53–51, 43–50
Pts: Ortíz 30; Rebs: Ortíz 11; Asts: Rivera 7		Pts: Gaze 29; Rebs: Fisher, Bradtke 6 Asts: Heal 7

Atlanta
Referees: Miguel Betancor Leon (ESP), Jose Lapaix Guance (DOM)

28 July 1996

Report

Australia	103–62	Greece
Scoring by half: 52–30, 51–32
Pts: Gaze 17; Rebs: Bradtke 8 Asts: Heal 5		Pts: Oikonomou 22; Rebs: Papanikolaou 6 Asts: Giannakis 4

Atlanta
Referees: Pascal Noel Dorizon (FRA), Jose Lapaix Guance (DOM)

Quarterfinals

30 July 1996
20:00

Report

Australia	73–71	Croatia
Scoring by half: 41–33, 32–38
Pts: Gaze 26; Rebs: Heal, Bradtke 5 Asts: Heal 7		Pts: Alanović 18; Rebs: Vranković 11; Asts: Kukoč 8

Atlanta
Referees: Wieslaw Zych (POL), Juan Figueroa (PUR)

Semifinals

1 August 1996
22:00

Report

United States	101–73	Australia
Scoring by half: 51–41, 50–32
Pts: Barkley 24; Rebs: Barkley 11; Asts: Pippen 5		Pts: Gaze 25; Rebs: Bradtke 11; Asts: Heal 5

Atlanta
Referees: Raul Chaves Sagel (ARG), Stylianos Koukoulekidis (GRE)

Bronze medal match

3 August 1996
20:00

Report

Lithuania	80–74	Australia
Scoring by half: 36–34, 44–40
Pts: Sabonis 30; Rebs: Sabonis 13; Asts: Marčiulionis 9		Pts: Gaze 25; Rebs: Bradtke 5 Asts: Heal 5

Atlanta
Referees: Joseph Derosa (USA), Juan Figueroa (PUR)

=== Women's tournament ===
Team roster

- Carla Boyd
- Michelle Brogan
- Sandy Brondello
- Michelle Chandler
- Trisha Fallon
- Robyn Maher
- Fiona Robinson
- Shelley Sandie
- Rachael Sporn
- Michele Timms
- Allison Tranquilli
- Jenny Whittle
- Head coach: Tom Maher

Preliminary round

Pos	Team	Pld	W	L	PF	PA	PD	Pts	Qualification
1	United States (H)	5	5	0	507	339	+168	10	Quarterfinals
2	Ukraine	5	3	2	354	358	−4	8 (Note: Head-to-head record: Ukraine 1–0 Australia)	Quarterfinals
3	Australia	5	3	2	369	319	+50	8	Quarterfinals
4	Cuba	5	2	3	365	377	−12	7 (Note: Head-to-head record: Cuba 1–0 South Korea)	Quarterfinals
5	South Korea	5	2	3	347	389	−42	7	
6	Zaire	5	0	5	287	447	−160	5	

Source: FIBA archive
Rules for classification: 1) points; 2) head-to-head points; 3) head-to-head goal average; 4) head-to-head number of points scored.
(H) Hosts
Notes:

21 July 1996

Boxscores

South Korea	61–76	Australia
Pts: Yoo Y-j 16; Rebs: Yu Y-j 9 Asts: Chun J-w 5		Pts: Sporn 21; Rebs: Sporn, Sandie 10; Asts: Timms 5

Morehouse College Gymnasium, Atlanta

23 July 1996

Boxscore

Australia	91–45	Zaire
Pts: Sandie 18; Rebs: Sandie 8 Asts: Timms, Fallon 4		Pts: Tshijuka 15; Rebs: Tshijuka 10; Asts: Kamanga 5

Morehouse College Gymnasium, Atlanta

25 July 1996

Boxscore

Cuba	63–75	Australia
Pts: Martínez 19; Rebs: Martínez 11; Asts: Seino 4		Pts: Timms 19; Rebs: Sporn 12; Asts: Brogan 4

Morehouse College Gymnasium, Atlanta

27 July 1996

Boxscore

Australia	79–96	United States
Pts: Timms 26; Rebs: Sporn 7 Asts: Maher 3		Pts: McClain 24; Rebs: McClain 11; Asts: Edwards 15

Morehouse College Gymnasium, Atlanta

29 July 1996

Boxscore

Ukraine	54–48	Australia
Pts: Dovhaliuk 15; Rebs: Nazarenko 15; Asts: Tkachenko, Burenok 3		Pts: Timms 13; Rebs: Sporn 10; Asts: Timms 3

Morehouse College Gymnasium, Atlanta

Quarterfinals

31 July 1996
17:00

Boxscore

Russia	70–74 (OT)	Australia
Scoring by half: 38–38, 26–26 Overtime: 6–10
Pts: Nikonova 16; Rebs: Baranova 21; Asts: Sumnikova 5		Pts: Brogan 17; Rebs: Brogan, Whittle 8 Asts: Brogan, Timms 3

Georgia Dome, Atlanta

Semifinals

2 August 1996
17:00

Boxscore

Australia	71–93	United States
Scoring by half: 32–47, 39–46
Pts: Timms 27; Rebs: Maher 6 Asts: Timms 4		Pts: Leslie 22; Rebs: McClain 15; Asts: Edwards 8

Georgia Dome, Atlanta

Bronze medal match

4 August 1996
16:00

Boxscore

Ukraine	56–66	Australia
Scoring by half: 24–33, 32–33
Pts: Zhyrko 16; Rebs: Zhyrko 9 Asts: Zhyrko, Nazarenko 3		Pts: Brogan 19; Rebs: Brogan 12; Asts: Timms 4

Georgia Dome, Atlanta

== Beach volleyball ==
- Julien Prosser and Lee Zahner — 9th place overall

== Boxing ==
Men's flyweight (51 kg)

- Hussein Hussein
  - First round — defeated Carmine Molaro (Italy), 11-8
  - Second round — lost to Damaen Kelly (Ireland), 20-27

Men's bantamweight (54 kg)

- James Swan
  - First round — lost to Kalai Riadh (Tunisia), 4-14

Men's featherweight (57 kg)

- Robert Peden
  - First round — defeated Mohamed Achik (Morocco), 15-7
  - Second round — lost to Serafim Todorov (Bulgaria), 8-20

Men's light welterweight (63,5 kg)

- Lee Trautsch
  - First round — lost to Fethi Missaoui (Tunisia), 9-25

Men's light welterweight (67 kg)

- Lynden Hosking
  - First round — lost to Nurzhan Smanov (Kazakhstan), referee stopped contest in second round

Men's light middleweight (71 kg)

- Richard Rowles
  - First round — lost to György Mizsei (Hungary), 2-10

Men's middleweight (75 kg)

- Justann Crawford
  - First round — defeated Sackey Shivute (Namibia), 12-3
  - Second round — lost to Alexander Lebziak (Russia), referee stopped contest in third round

Men's light heavyweight (81 kg)

- Rick Timperi
  - First round — lost to Thomas Ulrich (Germany), 7-21

== Canoeing ==
Slalom

Men's C-1

- Justin Boocock
  - Total score: 166.96 - 16th

Men's C-2

- Andrew Wilson and John Felton
  - Total score: 199.06 - 14th

Men's K-1

- Richard MacQuire
  - Total score: 153.07 - 24th
- Matthew Pallister
  - Total score: 179.19 - 38th

Women's K-1

- Mia Farrance
  - Total score: 180.30 - 14th
- Danielle Woodward
  - Total score: 177.60 - 12th

Sprint

Men's K-1 500 metres

- Cameron McFadzean
  - Qualifying heat: 1:42.160 - 2nd
  - Semi final: 1:41.083 - 4th
  - Final: 1:41.023 - 9th

Men's K-1 1000 metres

- Clint Robinson
  - Qualifying heat: 3:44.768 - 2nd
  - Semi final: 3:43.657 - 1st
  - Final: 3:29.713 - 3rd (bronze)

Men's K-2 500 metres

- Daniel Collins and Andrew Trim
  - Qualifying heat: 1:31.433 - 2nd
  - Semi final: 1:29.937 - 2nd
  - Final: 1:29.409 - 3rd (bronze)

Men's K-2 1000 metres

- Peter Scott and Grant Leury
  - Qualifying heat: 3:40.114 - 1st
  - Semi final: 3:19.056 - 5th
  - Final: 3:13.054 - 7th

Men's K-4 1000 metres

- James Walker, Paul Lynch, Brian Morton and Ramon Andersson
  - Qualifying heat: 3:11.752 - 3rd
  - Semi final: 3:01.806 - 1st
  - Final: 2:57.560 - 9th

Women's K-1 500 metres

- Katrin Borchert
  - Qualifying heat: 1:53.767 - 1st
  - Semi final: 1:51.142 - 5th
  - Final: 1:50.811 - 7th

Women's K-2 500 metres

- Anna Wood and Katrin Borchert
  - Qualifying heat: 1:43.633 - 2nd
  - Semi final: 1:43.729 - 2nd
  - Final: 1:40.641 - 3rd (bronze)

Women's K-4 500 metres

- Shelley Oates-Wilding, Yanda Nossiter, Lynda Lehmann and Natalie Hunter
  - Qualifying heat: 1:41.185 - 3rd
  - Semi final: 1:37.905 - 3rd
  - Final: 1:34.673 - 8th

== Cycling ==
=== Road competition ===
Men's individual time trial

- Patrick Jonker
  - Final — 1:06:54 (→ 8th place)
- Stephen Hodge
  - Final — 1:09:59 (→ 23rd place)

Women's individual road race

- Kathryn Watt
  - Final — 02:37:06 (→ 9th place)
- Anna Wilson
  - Final — 02:37:06 (→ 17th place)
- Tracey Watson
  - Final — 02:42:35 (→ 39th place)

Women's individual time trial

- Kathryn Watt
  - Final — 37:53 (→ 4th place)
- Anna Wilson
  - Final — 38:50 (→ 10th place)

=== Track competition ===
Men's 1,000m time trial

- Shane Kelly — did not finish (→ no ranking)

Men's points race

- Stuart O'Grady
  - Final — 25 points (→ Bronze medal)

=== Mountain bike ===
Men's cross country

- Cadel Evans
  - Final — 2:26:15 (→ 9th place)
- Robert Woods
  - Final — 2:33:14 (→ 16th place)

Women's cross country

- Mary Grigson
  - Final — 2:02.38 (→ 15th place)

== Diving ==
Men's 3m springboard

- Michael Murphy
  - Preliminary heat — 419.13
  - Semi final — 220.08
  - Final — 420.87 (→ 6th place)
- Russell Butler
  - Preliminary heat — 305.79 (→ did not advance, 28th place)

Women's 3m springboard

- Jodie Rogers
  - Preliminary heat — 242.19
  - Semi final — 204.18 (→ did not advance, 15th place)
- Loudy Tourky
  - Preliminary heat — 229.11 (→ did not advance, 19th place)

Women's 10m platform

- Vyninka Arlow
  - Preliminary heat — 243.57 (→ did not advance, 19th place)
- Vanessa Baker
  - Preliminary heat — 225.84 (→ did not advance, 25th place)

== Equestrian ==
Individual dressage

- Mary Hanna
  - Grand Prix Test: 1644 points - 24th
  - Grand Prix Special 2nd qualifier: Total score 130.09 - 24th - did not advance

Individual eventing

- Nikki Bishop
  - Dressage: 520 points - 3rd
  - Cross country: disqualified - eliminated
- David Green
  - Dressage: 491 points - 8th
  - Cross country: did not finish - retired
- Andrew Hoy
  - Dressage: 413+2 points - 29th
  - Cross country: total points 49.2 - 14th
  - Show jumping: penalty points 0 - 1st
  - Final result: 112.60 - 11th

Team eventing

- Wendy Schaeffer, Phillip Dutton, Gillian Rolton and Andrew Hoy
  - Dressage: 156.40 - 6th
  - Cross country: 27.29 - 1st
  - Jumping: 20.25 - 6th
  - Final result: 203.85 - 1st (gold)

Individual jumping

- David Cooper
  - Total score: 88.25 - 71st
- Russell Johnstone
  - Total score: 48.00 - 61st
- Jennifer Parlevliet
  - Total score: Did not finish
- Vicki Roycroft
  - Total score: 40.00 - 55th

Team jumping

- Jennifer Parlevliet, Vicki Roycroft, David Cooper and Russell Johnstone
  - Total score: 129.00 - 19th

== Fencing ==
One woman represented Australia in 1996.

Women's épée

- Sarah Osvath

== Football ==
Men's tournament

- France - Australia 2-0
- Australia - Saudi Arabia 2-1
  - Goalscorers: Peter Tsekenis and Mark Viduka
- Spain - Australia 3-2
  - Goalscorers: Aurelio Vidmar (2)
  - Did not advance from group stage

Squad

- Frank Juric
- Goran Lozanovski
- Ante Moric
- Mark Babic
- Kevin Muscat
- Steve Horvat
- Peter Tsekenis
- Steve Corica
- Mark Viduka
- Aurelio Vidmar
- Danny Tiatto
- Joe Spiteri
- Hayden Foxe
- Paul Agostino
- Luke Casserly
- Robert Enes
- Ross Aloisi
- Michael Petkovic

== Gymnastics ==
Men's competitions

- Brennon Dowrick
  - Artistic individual all-around: 35th
  - Floor: 83rd
  - Horizontal bar: 53rd
  - Parallel bars: 56th
  - Pommel horse: 45th
  - Rings: 69th
  - Vault: 92nd
- Bret Hudson
  - Artistic individual all-around: Did not advance from preliminary round - 51st
  - Floor: 75th
  - Horizontal bar: 75th
  - Parallel bars: 55th
  - Pommel horse: 73rd
  - Rings: 78th
  - Vault: 55th

Women's competitions

- Joanna Hughes
  - Artistic individual all-around: 34th
  - Artistic team all-around: 10th
  - Balance beam: 62nd
  - Floor: 38th
  - Uneven bars: 76th
  - Vault: 41st
- Nicole Kantek
  - Artistic individual all-around: Did not advance from preliminary round - 88th
  - Artistic team all-around: 10th
  - Balance beam: 93rd
  - Floor: 77th
  - Uneven bars: 95th
  - Vault: 70th
- Kirsty Leigh-Brown
  - Artistic individual all-around: Did not advance from preliminary round - 104th
- Ruth Moniz
  - Artistic individual all-around: 35th
  - Artistic team all-around: 10th
  - Balance beam: 30th
  - Floor: 80th
  - Uneven bars: 40th
  - Vault: 84th
- Lisa Moro
  - Artistic individual all-around: Did not advance from preliminary round - 77th
  - Artistic team all-around: 10th
  - Balance beam: 47th
  - Floor: 46th
  - Uneven bars: 35th
  - Vault: 96th
- Lisa Skinner
  - Artistic individual all-around: 36th
  - Artistic team all-around: 10th
  - Balance beam: 42nd
  - Floor: 49th
  - Uneven bars: 50th
  - Vault: 72nd
- Jenny Smith
  - Artistic individual all-around: Did not advance from preliminary round - 53rd
  - Artistic team all-around: 10th
  - Balance beam: 58th
  - Floor: 59th
  - Uneven bars: 81st
  - Vault: 53rd

== Hockey ==
=== Men's tournament ===
- Preliminary round (Group B)
  - Australia — South Africa 1-1
  - Australia — South Korea 3-2
  - Australia — The Netherlands 2-3
  - Australia — Malaysia 5-1
  - Australia — Great Britain 2-0
- Semi finals
  - Australia — Spain 1-2
- Bronze medal game
  - Australia — Germany 3-2 (→ Bronze medal)
- Team roster
  - Mark Hager
  - Stephen Davies
  - Baeden Choppy
  - Lachlan Elmer
  - Stuart Carruthers
  - Grant Smith
  - Damon Diletti (gk)
  - Lachlan Dreher (gk)
  - Brendan Garard
  - Paul Gaudoin
  - Paul Lewis
  - Matthew Smith
  - Jay Stacy
  - Daniel Sproule
  - Ken Wark
  - Michael York
- Head coach: Frank Murray

=== Women's tournament ===
- Preliminary round robin
  - Australia — Spain 4-0
  - Australia — Argentina 7-1
  - Australia — Germany 1-0
  - Australia — South Korea 3-3
  - Australia — Great Britain 1-0
  - Australia — United States 4-0
  - Australia — The Netherlands 4-0
- Final
  - Australia — South Korea 3-1 (→ Gold medal)
- Team roster
  - Clover Maitland (gk)
  - Danni Roche
  - Liane Tooth
  - Alyson Annan
  - Juliet Haslam
  - Jenn Morris
  - Louise Dobson
  - Lisa Powell
  - Karen Marsden
  - Kate Starre
  - Renita Farrell
  - Jackie Pereira
  - Nova Peris-Kneebone
  - Rechelle Hawkes
  - Katrina Powell
  - Michelle Andrews
- Head Coach: Ric Charlesworth

== Modern pentathlon ==
Men's individual competition:

- Alexander Johnson → 3697 pts, 32nd place

== Softball ==
=== Women's tournament ===
- Preliminary round robin
  - Lost to PR China (0:6)
  - Defeated Chinese Taipei (4:0)
  - Lost to Puerto Rico (0:2)
  - Defeated Netherlands (1:0)
  - Defeated Japan (10:0)
  - Defeated United States (2:1)
  - Defeated Canada (5:2)
- Semifinals
  - Defeated Japan (3:0)
- Bronze medal match
  - Lost to PR China (2:4) → Bronze medal
- Team roster
  - Natalie Ward
  - Tanya Harding
  - Peta Edebone
  - Melanie Roche
  - Brooke Wilkins
  - Joanne Brown
  - Kerry Dienelt
  - Sally McDermid-McCreedy
  - Kim Cooper
  - Carolyn Crudgington
  - Jennifer Holliday
  - Joyce Lester
  - Francine McRae
  - Haylea Petrie
  - Nicole Richardson

== Swimming ==
=== Men's competitions ===
50m freestyle

- Chris Fydler
  - Heat — 22.98 (→ did not advance, 19th place)

100m freestyle

- Chris Fydler
  - Heat — 50.72
  - B-final — 50.31 (→ 13th place)

200m freestyle

- Daniel Kowalski
  - Heat — 1:48.92
  - Final — 1:48.25 (→ Bronze medal)
- Michael Klim
  - Heat — 1:49.17
  - B-final — 1:49.50 (→ 10th place)

200m freestyle

- Daniel Kowalski
  - Heat — 3:51.67
  - Final — 3:49.39 (→ Bronze medal)
- Malcolm Allen
  - Heat — 3:54.34
  - B-final — 3:55.48 (→ 13th place)

1500m freestyle

- Kieren Perkins
  - Heat — 15:21.42
  - Final — 14:56.40 (→ Gold medal)
- Daniel Kowalski
  - Heat — 15:12.55
  - Final — 15:02.43 (→ Silver medal)

100m backstroke

- Steven Dewick
  - Heat — 56.35
  - B-Final — 56.82 (→ 15th place)

200m backstroke

- Steven Dewick
  - Heat — 2:04.46 (→ did not advance, 23rd place)

100m breaststroke

- Phil Rogers
  - Heat — 1:01.80
  - Final — 1:01.64 (→ 5th place)

200m breaststroke

- Phil Rogers
  - Heat — 2:14.97
  - Final — 2:14.79 (→ 5th place)
- Ryan Mitchell
  - Heat — 2:15.31
  - B-Final — 2:15.63 (→ 11th place)

100m butterfly

- Scott Miller
  - Heat — 52.89
  - Final — 52.53 (→ Silver medal)
- Michael Klim
  - Heat — 53.42
  - Final — 53.30 (→ 6th place)

200m butterfly

- Scott Goodman
  - Heat — 1:57.77
  - Final — 1:57.48 (→ Bronze medal)
- Scott Miller
  - Heat — 1:58.97
  - Final — 1:58.28 (→ 5th place)

200m individual medley

- Matthew Dunn
  - Heat — 2:01.44
  - Final — 2:01.57 (→ 5th place)
- Simon Coombs
  - Heat — 2:07.31 (→ did not advance, 28th place)

400m individual medley

- Matthew Dunn
  - Heat — 4:19.51
  - Final — 4:16.66 (→ 4th place)
- Trent Steed
  - Heat — 4:24.39
  - B-Final — 4:29.35 (→ 15th place)

4 × 100 m freestyle relay

- Michael Klim, Ian Vander-Wal, Scott Logan, and Chris Fydler
  - Heat — 3:20.88
- Michael Klim, Matthew Dunn, Scott Logan, and Chris Fydler
  - Final — 3:20.13 (→ 6th place)

4 × 200 m freestyle relay

- Kieren Perkins, Glen Housman, Ian Vander-Wal, and Malcolm Allen
  - Heat — 7:23.24
- Daniel Kowalski, Michael Klim, Malcolm Allen, and Matthew Dunn
  - Final — 7:18.47 (→ 4th place)

4 × 100 m medley relay

- Toby Haenen, Phil Rogers, Scott Miller, and Michael Klim
  - Heat — 3:41.30
- Steven Dewick, Phil Rogers, Scott Miller, and Michael Klim
  - Final — 3:39.56 (→ Bronze medal)

=== Women's competitions ===
50m freestyle

- Karen van Wirdum
  - Heat — 25.88
  - B-Final — 26.17 (→ 15th place)
- Sarah Ryan
  - Heat — 26.34 (→ did not advance, 21st place)

100m freestyle

- Sarah Ryan
  - Heat — 56.07
  - Final — 55.85 (→ 6th place)

200m freestyle

- Susie O'Neill
  - Heat — 2:00.89
  - Final — 1:59.87 (→ 5th place)
- Julia Greville
  - Heat — 2:00.44
  - Final — 2:01.46 (→ 7th place)

400m freestyle

- Emma Johnson
  - Heat — 4:14.13
  - B-Final — 4:15.79 (→ 12th place)
- Hayley Lewis
  - Heat — 4:17.02
  - B-Final — 4:16.92 (→ 15th place)

800m freestyle

- Stacey Gartrell
  - Heat — 8:42.39 (→ did not advance, 11th place)
- Hayley Lewis
  - Heat — 8:45.79 (→ did not advance, 13th place)

100m backstroke

- Nicole Stevenson
  - Heat — 1:02.50
  - Final — 1:02.70 (→ 7th place)
- Elli Overton
  - Heat — 1:03.88
  - B-Final — 1:03.69 (→ 14th place)

200m backstroke

- Nicole Stevenson
  - Heat — 2:16.71 (→ did not advance, 18th place)

100m breaststroke

- Samantha Riley
  - Heat — 1:09.37
  - Final — 1:09.18 (→ Bronze medal)
- Helen Denman
  - Heat — 1:10.64
  - B-Final — 1:10.26 (→ 11th place)

200m breaststroke

- Samantha Riley
  - Heat — 2:28.30
  - Final — 2:27.91 (→ 4th place)
- Nadine Neumann
  - Heat — 2:29.91
  - Final — 2:28.34 (→ 6th place)

100m butterfly

- Susie O'Neill
  - Heat — 1:00.55
  - Final — 1:00.17 (→ 5th place)
- Angela Kennedy
  - Heat — 1:01.89 (→ did not advance, 18th place)

200m butterfly

- Susie O'Neill
  - Heat — 2:09.46
  - Final — 2:07.76 (→ Gold medal)
- Petria Thomas
  - Heat — 2:10.64
  - Final — 2:09.82 (→ Silver medal)

200m individual medley

- Elli Overton
  - Heat — 2:15.81
  - Final — 2:16.04 (→ 5th place)
- Emma Johnson
  - Heat — 2:17.02
  - Final — scratched

400m individual medley

- Emma Johnson
  - Heat — 4:43.45
  - Final — 4:44.02 (→ 5th place)
- Elli Overton
  - Heat — 4:49.82
  - B-Final — 4:50.73 (→ 14th place)

4 × 100 m freestyle relay

- Anna Windsor, Sarah Ryan, Lise Mackie, and Julia Greville
  - Heat — 3:47.94
- Sarah Ryan, Julia Greville, Lise Mackie, and Susie O'Neill
  - Final — 3:45.31 (→ 6th place)

4 × 200 m freestyle relay

- Julia Greville, Lise Mackie, Emma Johnson, and Susie O'Neill
  - Heat — 8:09.33
- Julia Greville, Nicole Stevenson, Emma Johnson, and Susie O'Neill
  - Final — 8:05.47 (→ Bronze medal)

4 × 100 m medley relay

- Nicole Stevenson, Helen Denman, Angela Kennedy, and Sarah Ryan
  - Heat — 4:08.87
- Nicole Stevenson, Samantha Riley, Susie O'Neill, and Sarah Ryan
  - Final — 4:05.08 (→ Silver medal)

== Tennis ==
Women's singles tournament

- Rennae Stubbs
  - First round — lost to Magdalena Maleeva (Bulgaria) 2-6 1-6
- Rachel McQuillan
  - First round — lost to Amanda Coetzer (South Africa) 4-6 6-7

== Weightlifting ==
Men's light-heavyweight (– 83 kg)

- Kiril Kounev
  - Final — 170.0 + 200.0 = 370.0 (→ 4th place)

== See also ==
- Australia at the 1994 Commonwealth Games
- Australia at the 1998 Commonwealth Games
