= 2015 ISF Men's World Championship rosters =

The following is a list of squads for each nation competing at the 2015 ISF Men's World Championship

== Pool A ==
=== Argentina ===
Head Coach
Julio Gamarci
Assistant Coaches
Andrés Gamarci, Alberto Guerrinieri, Kevin Bolzán, Rafael Salguero, Nicolás Jiménez, Javier Martinez, Jacinto Cipriota

Player	No.	Pos.	DOB and age	Team	League	Birthplace
Juan Brandauer	-	-				Bahía Blanca, Argentina
Mauricio Cáceres	-	-				Bahía Blanca, Argentina
Nicolás Carril	13	OF	June 28, 1990 (aged 24)	Don Bosco		Paraná, Argentina
Sebastián Gervasutti	-	-				Bilbao, Argentina
Gustavo Godoy	82	INF	October 25, 1981 (aged 33)	Patronato		Paraná, Argentina
Manuel Godoy	27	OF	September 25, 1987 (aged 27)	Patronato		Paraná, Argentina
Román Godoy Herbel	70	P	October 22, 1995 (aged 19)	Don Bosco		Paraná, Argentina
Ladislao Malarczuk	24	INF	September 13, 1994 (aged 20)	CPEF No. 5		Paraná, Argentina
Huemel Mata	4	P	January 15, 1995 (aged 20)	Mayú		Santa Rosa, Argentina
Mariano Mayoral	-	-				La Pampa, Argentina
Teo Migliavacca	-	-				La Pampa, Argentina
Mariano Montero	17	OF	June 3, 1985 (aged 30)	Patronato		Paraná, Argentina
Pablo Montero	-	-				Paraná, Argentina
Bruno Motroni	28	C	December 16, 1985 (aged 29)	Patronato		Paraná, Argentina
Fernando Petric	41	OF	March 14, 1978 (aged 37)	Estudiantes		Paraná, Argentina
Juan Potolicchio	34	P	October 23, 1982 (aged 32)	Estudiantes		Esperanza, Argentina
Juan Cruz Zara	6	INF	May 26, 1993 (aged 22)	Indios		Bahía Blanca, Argentina

=== Canada ===
Head Coach
John Stuart
Assistant Coaches
Glenn Boles, John Hill, Les Howey

Player	No.	Pos.	DOB and age	Team	League	Birthplace
Bryan Abrey	42	C	April 30, 1987 (aged 28)			Richmond, British Columbia
Ryan Boland	51	C	October 5, 1987 (aged 27)	NTV Hitmen	St. John's Senior Men's Softball League	Goulds, Newfoundland
Sean Cleary	44	P	November 30, 1984 (aged 30)	Kelly's Pub Molson Bulldogs	St. John's Senior Men's Softball League	Harbour Main, Newfoundland
Jeff Ellsworth	19	OF	November 8, 1977 (aged 37)	Charlottetown John Browns Fawcetts	Canadian Senior Men's Softball Championship	St. Lawrence, Prince Edward Island
Brad Ezekiel	22	OF	March 21, 1987 (aged 28)	NTV Hitmen	St. John's Senior Men's Softball League	Harbour Main, Newfoundland
Ian Fehrman	14	INF	January 19, 1980 (aged 35)	Hallman Twins	Canadian Senior Men's Softball Championship	Townsend, Ontario
Jason Hill	10	UTL	September 12, 1984 (aged 30)	3 Cheers Pub Bud Light	St. John's Senior Men's Softball League	St. John's, Newfoundland
Brandon Horn	17	INF	October 20, 1984 (aged 30)	Scarborough Force	Canadian Senior Men's Softball Championship	Waterloo, Ontario
Paul Koert	30	P	October 10, 1978 (aged 36)			Stouffville, Ontario
Derek Mayson	29	P/INF	April 16, 1984 (aged 31)	Lomas	Lower Mainland Fastball League	North Vancouver, British Columbia
Devon McCullough	24	P	September 28, 1990 (aged 24)	Saskatoon Senior Diamondbacks	Saskatoon Amateur Softball Association	Saskatoon, Saskatchewan
Steve Mullaley	33	OF	November 30, 1983 (aged 31)	3 Cheers Pub Bud Light	Canadian Senior Men's Softball Championship	Freshwater, Newfoundland
Mathieu Roy	15	OF	December 21, 1988 (aged 26)	Quebec Seniors	Canadian Senior Men's Softball Championship	Saint-Gervais, Quebec
Jason Sanford	8	C	June 18, 1977 (aged 38)			Durham, Nova Scotia
Kevin Schellenberg	6	INF	October 16, 1980 (aged 34)	Giants	Lower Mainland Fastball League	Squamish, British Columbia
Andy Skelton	9	P	April 23, 1987 (aged 28)	Scarborough Force	International Softball Congress World Tournament	Scarborough, Ontario
Ryan Wolfe	77	OF	June 25, 1975 (aged 40)	Hallman Twins	International Softball Congress World Tournament	Melbourne, Ontario

=== Czech Republic ===
Head Coach
Tomáš Kusý
Assistant Coaches
Jaroslav Korčák, Petr Novák

Player	No.	Pos.	DOB and age	Team	League	Birthplace
Tomáš Benda	5	OF	February 1, 1987 (aged 28)	SK Krč Praha	Czech Extraliga	Czech Republic
Jan Borovka	--	-	October 17, 1989 (aged 25)	Žraloci Ledenice	Czech Extraliga	Czech Republic
Jiří Brabeck	14	OF/P	February 19, 1984 (aged 31)	Tempo Praha	Czech Extraliga	Czech Republic
Jaroslav Breník	23	P	November 23, 1984 (aged 30)	Radotínský sportovní klub	Czech Extraliga	Czech Republic
Lukáš Fiala	--	-	July 25, 1984 (aged 30)	Tempo Praha	Czech Extraliga	Czech Republic
Petr Frejlach	88	P/OF	September 8, 1994 (aged 20)	Žraloci Ledenice	Czech Extraliga	Czech Republic
Tomáš Jelínek	17	OF	June 29, 1988 (aged 26)	Hroši Havlíčkův Brod	Czech Extraliga	Czech Republic
Aleš Jetmar	24	P	April 20, 1974 (aged 41)	Radotínský sportovní klub	Czech Extraliga	Czech Republic
Pavel Just	25	1B	November 6, 1984 (aged 30)	Hroši Havlíčkův Brod	Czech Extraliga	Czech Republic
Karel Kadečka	45	1B/3B	January 31, 1980 (aged 35)	Hroši Havlíčkův Brod	Czech Extraliga	Czech Republic
Mikuláš Klas	10	1B/OF	December 17, 1993 (aged 21)	SK Kotlářka Praha	Czech Extraliga	Czech Republic
Tomáš Klein	19	C	May 10, 1992 (aged 23)	Spectrum Praha	Czech Extraliga	Czech Republic
Patrik Kolkus	28	UTIL	April 12, 1977 (aged 38)	Spectrum Praha	Czech Extraliga	Czech Republic
Jonáš Mach	30	P	June 20, 1984 (aged 31)	SK Krč Praha	Czech Extraliga	Czech Republic
Ondřej Maleček	--	-	August 17, 1987 (aged 27)	Spectrum Praha	Czech Extraliga	Czech Republic
Marek Malý	27	P/3B	April 20, 1995 (aged 20)	Sportclub 80 Chomutov	Czech Extraliga	Czech Republic
David Mertl	4	C	April 9, 1983 (aged 32)	Spectrum Praha	Czech Extraliga	Czech Republic
Jaroslav Müller	33	P	December 1, 1986 (aged 28)	Hroši Havlíčkův Brod	Czech Extraliga	Czech Republic
Jiří Nezbuda	78	OF	December 23, 1987 (aged 27)	Painbusters Most	Czech Extraliga	Czech Republic
Tomáš Petr	2	SS	July 26, 1988 (aged 26)	Spectrum Praha	Czech Extraliga	Czech Republic
Bartoloměj Řízek	18	C	January 26, 1991 (aged 24)	Spartak Sezimovo Ústí	Czech Extraliga	Czech Republic
Svatopluk Smysl	--	-	April 21, 1955 (aged 60)	Tempo Praha	Czech Extraliga	Czech Republic
Václav Svoboda	99	INF	December 20, 1985 (aged 29)	Sportclub 80 Chomutov	Czech Extraliga	Czech Republic
Petr Vácha	22	OF	June 4, 1981 (aged 34)	Spectrum Praha	Czech Extraliga	Czech Republic
Tomáš Voborník	8	INF	April 20, 1988 (aged 27)	Hroši Havlíčkův Brod	Czech Extraliga	Czech Republic

=== New Zealand ===
Head Coach
Mark Sorenson
Assistant Coaches
Carl Franklin

Player	No.	Pos.	DOB and age	Team	League	Birthplace
Nik Hayes	30	P		Hutt Valley Dodgers	New Zealand Interclub Championship	Hutt Valley, New Zealand
Kurt Schollum	14	P		Albion	New Zealand Interclub Championship	Marlborough, New Zealand
Heinie Shannon	5	P				Auckland, New Zealand
Connor Peden	--	C		Roosters	New Zealand Interclub Championship	North Shore, New Zealand
Stephen Ratu	13	C				Canterbury, New Zealand
Tyson Byrne	7	INF				Hutt Valley, New Zealand
Joel Evans	3	INF		Hutt Valley Dodgers	New Zealand Interclub Championship	Hutt Valley, New Zealand
Cole Evans	--	INF		Ramblers	New Zealand Interclub Championship	Auckland, New Zealand
Josh Harbrow	68	INF		Albion	New Zealand Interclub Championship	Canterbury, New Zealand
Jerome Raemaki	6	INF		Poneke Kilbirne	New Zealand Interclub Championship	Wellington, New Zealand
Brad Rona	--	INF		Northcote	New Zealand Interclub Championship	Auckland, New Zealand
Nathan Nukunuku	12	OF	May 8, 1980 (aged 35)	Ramblers	New Zealand Interclub Championship	Auckland, New Zealand
Thomas Enoka	20	OF		Auckland United	New Zealand Interclub Championship	Auckland, New Zealand
Ben Enoka	89	OF		Auckland United	New Zealand Interclub Championship	Auckland, New Zealand
Jovaan Hanley	--	OF		Poneke Kilbirne	New Zealand Interclub Championship	Wellington, New Zealand
Wayne Laulu	29	OF				Wellington, New Zealand
Campbell Makea	19	OF				Wellington, New Zealand

=== Philippines ===
Head Coach
Alejandro Estipular

Assistant Coaches
Noel Bumagat, Raymundo Pagkaliwagan, Apolonio Rosales

Player	No.	Pos.	DOB and age	Team	League	Birthplace
Sonny Acuña	88	P	May 4, 1974 (aged 41)			
Gregorio Marquez	98	P	April 24, 1979 (aged 36)			
William Mendoza	9	P	February 9, 1983 (aged 32)			
Anthony Olaez	29	P	May 4, 1984 (aged 31)			
Isidro Abello	15	C	May 15, 1979 (aged 36)			
Jasper Cabrera	2	C	September 19, 1976 (aged 38)			
Oscar Bradshaw	21	INF	March 6, 1980 (aged 35)			
Ben Maravilles	12	INF	May 16, 1974 (aged 41)			
Denmark Bathan	4	OF	July 15, 1989 (aged 25)			
Edmer del Socorro	32	OF	August 20, 1981 (aged 33)			
Vermon Diaz	66	OF	March 26, 1979 (aged 36)			
Jeffrey Hardillo	19	OF	October 14, 1981 (aged 33)			
Saxon Omandac	31	OF	November 29, 1981 (aged 33)			
Joseph Orillana	22	OF	September 22, 1980 (aged 34)			
Apolonio Rosales	16	UT	March 8, 1977 (aged 38)			

== Pool B ==
=== Australia ===
Head Coach
Laing Harrow
Assistant Coaches
Bob Harrow, Darrin Hebditch

Player	No.	Pos.	DOB and age	Team	League	Birthplace
Adam Folkard	13	P		ACT 89ers	John Reid Shield	ACT, Australia
Andrew Kirkpatrick	23	P/1B		ACT 89ers	John Reid Shield	ACT, Australia
Nick Norton	16	SS		ACT 89ers	John Reid Shield	ACT, Australia
Zenon Winters	--	OF		ACT 89ers	John Reid Shield	ACT, Australia
James Brownlow	--	1B	October 27, 1984 (aged 30)	New South Wales Blue Bloods	John Reid Shield	NSW, Australia
Kieran O'Leary	--	2B	June 5, 1995 (aged 20)	New South Wales Blue Bloods	John Reid Shield	NSW, Australia
Harrison Peters	9	P		New South Wales Blue Bloods	John Reid Shield	NSW, Australia
James Todhunter	99	SS	July 21, 1992 (aged 22)	New South Wales Blue Bloods	John Reid Shield	NSW, Australia
Peter Wards	21	3B	March 19, 1991 (aged 24)	New South Wales Blue Bloods	John Reid Shield	NSW, Australia
Aaron Cockman	--	1B		Papanui	New Zealand Interclub Championship	WA, Australia
Mark Harris	2	C/OF/P		Western Australia Blaze	John Reid Shield	WA, Australia
Andrew Havercroft	4	C				WA, Australia
Ryan Sinclair	27	OF		Victoria	John Reid Shield	VIC, Australia
Shawn Goffer	15	OF		Queensland Patriots	John Reid Shield	Redland City, QLD, Australia
Marshall Kronk	18	P		Queensland Patriots	John Reid Shield	Redland City, QLD, Australia
Julian Jemmott	10	SS		Queensland Patriots	John Reid Shield	Redland City, QLD, Australia
Nick Shailes	--	-				QLD, Australia

=== Japan ===
Head Coach
Nobunori Nishimura

Assistant Coaches
Tatsuya Hamaguchi, Takeo Kido

Player	No.	Pos.	DOB and age	Team	League	Birthplace
Hikaru Matsuda	20	P				
Yuki Mori	22	P				
Kenji Nakamura	17	P				
Kento Okazaki	19	P				
Hayami Takahashi	21	P				
Kengo Terui	25	P				
Takuro Hiramoto	26	C				
Taiyo Kataokao	2	C				
Yusuke Itose	6	IF				
Masateru Matsuoka	10	IF				
Kota Mera	5	IF				
Masaki Sawada	12	IF				
Takuto Tsutsui	8	IF				
Daishi Uramoto	9	IF				
Naoaki Kawada	7	OF				
Kengo Kidani	28	OF				
Yukihiro Nishiyama	24	OF				

=== United States ===
Head Coach
Denny Bruckert
Assistant Coaches
Greg Hicks, Gregg Leather, Nick McCurry

Player	No.	Pos.	DOB and age	Team	League	Birthplace
Kris Bogach	14	-				Port Jervis, New York, United States
Freddy Carmona	--	-				San Antonio, Texas, United States
Kevin Castillo	--	-				Long Beach, California, United States
Frank DeGroat Jr.	8	-				Ringwood, New Jersey, United States
Nate Devine	40	-				Sonora, California, United States
Josh Johnson	19	-				El Paso, Texas, United States
Tony Mancha	11	P				Las Cruces, New Mexico, United States
Chris Miljavac	12	-				Easton, Missouri, United States
Gerald Muizelaar	10	-				Grand Forks, North Dakota, United States
Nick Mullins	35	-				Toms River, New Jersey, United States
Matt Palazzo	4	-				Pleasant Hill, Iowa, United States
Bobby Rosthenhausler	7	-				Tucson, Arizona, United States
Pat Sagdal	25	-				Richland, Washington, United States
Rylan Sandoval	--	-				Castro Valley, California, United States
Marcus Tan	21	-				Union City, California, United States
Chase Turner	77	-				San Jose, California, United States
Derrick Zechman	9	-				Watsontown, Pennsylvania, United States
