= Softball in Western Australia =

Softball is played in Western Australia.

== History and governance ==
Softball saw a "benefit" in the bombing of Darwin and the inclusion of Australia in World War II in terms of bringing in American military personnel who brought softball with them to this state. In 1950, the Western Australia state softball federation aligned itself with the Australian Women's Softball Council. Up to twenty games a Saturday were being played at Langley Park by the Esplanade in Perth in 1955. After the failure of getting softball on the 1956 Olympic programme, an attempt was made by Western Australians to get softball included on the schedule at the 1962 British Empire and Commonwealth Games that were going to be held in Perth. Empire Games organisers did not support this as they allowed neither team sports, nor demonstration sports at the Games. In 1971, there were 66 teams affiliated with the state organisation, 92 in 1975, 110 in 1976, 224 in 1977, 261 in 1978, 547 in 1983 and 714 in 1984.

== Participation ==
The state association is involved with Softball Australia's Play Ball programme and is working to increase junior participation in the sport in their state. In order to grow indigenous Australian participation, targeted outreach is being done in remote indigenous communities including in Binjari, Kalkaringi, Timber Creek and Borroloola all in the Katherine Region.

== National championships ==
=== Gilleys Shield ===
Western Australia won the Mack Gilley Shield in 1952 and 1953. They did not win in 1954 but won it again in 1955. They missed out in winning from 1956 to 1958, before winning again in 1959. They did not win another championship between 1960 and 1994. The state hosted the Mack Gilley Shield in Perth in 1952, 1957, and 1963.

=== Elinor McKenzie Shield ===
At the 2007 Australian U-19 Women's Fastpitch Championship, Western Australia lost to New South Wales in the finals. Western Australian Chelsea Forkin was named the competition's most valuable player and best batter.

== Players ==
=== National team representatives ===
Members of the 2012 Australia women's national softball team from Western Australia include Verity Long-Droppert, Chelsea Forkin and Leigh Godfrey.

=== American university players ===
Some softball players from this state have played softball for American universities, which depleted the level of high quality players available for local, state and international competitions. They include Leigh Godfrey who attended Radford University in starting in 2009.

== Men's softball ==
In 1982, there were 208 men's open teams and 22 junior teams in Western Australia. In 1985, Australia had an unofficial men's test team of all stars who played against the New Zealand national team in Melbourne. Team members from Western Australia included L. Anderson, T. Bull, D. Rector, and G. Knight. In 1991, the Australia men's national softball team played four games of an eight-game test series against the New Zealand team in Perth.

== See also ==
- Softball Australia
- Softball in Australia
- Bayswater Morley Softball Club
