= Andrew Blackshaw =

Australian softball player

Personal information
- Nationality: Australian
- Born: 12 October 1990 (age 35) Goulburn, New South Wales

Sport
- Country: Australia
- Sport: Softball
- Event: Men's team
- Club: Raiders in the Redland Softball Association
- Turned pro: 2009

Andrew Blackshaw (born 10 December 1990 in Goulburn, New South Wales) is an Australian softball player. He is a member of the Australia men's national softball team, making his debut in 2009.

== Personal ==
Blackshaw was born on 10 December 1990 in Goulburn, New South Wales. He lives in Manly West, Queensland.

== Softball ==
Blackshaw plays several positions including pitcher, but has also played second base and center field. He wears jersey number 13. A writer for the Chicago Tribune described his pitching style as "herky-jerky windmill style".

The first team Blackshaw played for was Wollondilly Wanderers. He plays club softball in Redland Softball Association competitions. In 2004, 2005 and 2006, he was playing for the Redland's U16 club Wildcats Club. His team was undefeated in 2004 and 2005, winning the association championships. In 2004, he was honoured by his club by being named the Male Player of the Future and the Most Valuable Player for his U16 club. In 2011, he represented his club at the 20th South Brisbane Club Classic. He currently plays for the Raiders in the Redland Softball Association.

Blackshaw represented Queensland as a member of the under-16 team in 2004, 2005 and 2006. In 2005, he competed in the national championships held at the Redlands Softball Centre in Ormiston, Queensland. In 2006, he competed in the national championships in Perth. In 2008, he represented Queensland as a member of the under-19 team at the national championships, where his team went out in the semi-finals. He plays for the Queensland Patriots in senior national competitions, and was a member in 2009, 2010, 2011 and 2012. In 2012, he won a bronze medal at the national competition.

Blackshaw is a member of Australia men's national softball team. He made his senior national debut in 2010. In 2011, he accompanied the team on a tour of Argentina. He is a member of the 2012 team.

Blackshaw was playing professional softball in Wisconsin in 2009. In 2009, he participated in a battle of the sexes game between a men's minor league baseball team and a women's professional softball team, the Chicago Bandits, where he was brought in the men's Schaumburg Flyers specifically for the game.

In 2009, he was honoured by being named the Keven Herlihy Newcomer of the Year award at the 2009 ISC World Tournament.
