= Northern Territory Softball Association =

- (Northern Territory)

The Northern Territory Softball Association is the smallest state body in the Australian Softball Federation with only two affiliated Associations.

In the Northern Territory's history they have never won any of the ASF National Championships.

== Yearly events ==
The Northern Territory Softball Association holds an annual Softball Carnival as part of the Arafura Games, this usually comprises teams from the Australian Defence Force, USA, Singapore, and the Northern Territory.

The Association also sends teams to the South Australia Softball Association's yearly Labour Day Softball Carnival, entering teams in the Under 16 Girls and Under 19 Women categories.

== State teams ==
The Northern Territory periodically attends ASF National Championships

- Under 16 Boys – Never Attended
- Under 16 Girls – Last Attended in 2001 in Hobart
- Under 19 Men – Never Attended
- Under 19 Women – Last Attended in 2002 in Adelaide
- Under 23 Men – Never Attended
- Under 23 Women – Last Attended in 2005 in Melbourne
- Open Men – Last Attended in 2003 in RedLands, Queensland
- Open Women – Have not attended in the past 5 years

== Associations ==
The Northern Territory is made up of 3 Associations both holding their own weekend competitions;

- Alice Springs Softball Association (Formed ????)
- Northern Territory Softball Association (Formed ????)

And 1 Umpires Association;

- Northern Territory Softball Umpires Association (Formed ????)

== Clubs ==
The Northern Territory Softball Association is made up of 4 Clubs;

- Palmerston Pirates Softball Club
- South Darwin Softball Club
- Tracy Village Softball Club
- Waratah Softball Club

== See also ==
- Australian Softball Federation
- ASF National Championships
