= Simon Sheldon-Collins =

Australian baseball player

Personal information
- Full name: Simon Francis Sheldon-Collins
- Born: 4 July 1967 (age 58) Melbourne, Victoria, Australia

Sport
- Country: Australia
- Sport: Baseball

Simon Francis Sheldon-Collins (born 4 July 1967 in Melbourne, Victoria) is an Australian baseball pitcher. He represented Australia at the 1996 Summer Olympics alongside his brother Matthew Sheldon-Collins.
