= Blackshaw (surname) =

Blackshaw is an English surname. Notable people with the surname include:

- Alan Blackshaw (1933–2011), English mountaineer, skier and civil servant
- Andrew Blackshaw (born 1990), Australian softball player
- Basil Blackshaw (1932–2016), Northern Ireland artist
- Bill Blackshaw (1920–1994), English footballer
- Christian Blackshaw (born 1949), British classical pianist
- James Blackshaw (born 1981), English musician
- Niamh Blackshaw (born 1999), English actress
