= Australian Capital Territory Softball Association =

- (Australian Capital Territory)

The Australian Capital Territory Softball Association is a regional sports body in Australia. It was founded in 1959 as the Federal Districts Women's Softball Association, a group under the New South Wales Softball Association until it became an independent state body in 1961.

== History ==
https://www.act.softball.org.au/history/

== Yearly events ==
The ACT Softball Association holds a number of annual events;

- Slow-Pitch invitational

This year(2006) will be the inaugural event.

- Canberra Skins

An annual Men's tournament hosted by Softball Canberra in two grades, A Grade and B Grade, both play for prize money, for more information see main article.

- Australia Day Carnival

An Annual Juniors event held over the Australia Day long weekend at the end of January. The Carnival caters for both boys and girls in the following;

  - Under 12 Boys and Girls,
  - Under 14 Boys and Girls,
  - Under 16 Boys and Girls and
  - Under 19 Men's.
- Other

Various ACT teams also compete in the New South Wales Softball Association's annual events;

  - State League, and
  - Waratah League.

== State teams ==
The ACT attends all ASF National Championships

- Under 16 Boys - 1st in 2000, Placed 6th in 2006,
- Under 16 Girls - Placed 4th in 2006,
- Under 19 Men - 1st in 2001, 2002, 2003, 2004, Placed 2nd in 2006,
- Under 19 Women - Placed 5th in 2006,
- Under 23 Men - 2006 Series yet to be played,
- Under 23 Women - 2006 Series yet to be played,
- Open Men - 1st in 2006, 2007, 2008, 2009
- Open Women - Places 4th in 2006.

In recent years, ACT softball has become a prominent part of men's softball in Australia and has produced a number of male softball players.

In 2000, the ACT Under 16 Boys' team won its first national title in Canberra, ACT. According to the cited source, several members of the team, including Andrew Kirkpatrick, Nick Norton, Nick Shailes, and Matt Norton, later continued their softball careers at senior levels.

The following year the majority of this team would compete at the Australian Under 19 Men's Nationals in Calbooture. With 10 of the 15 players only 16 years old the team overcame the huge age difference to secure their first of four consecutive National Titles at the under 19 level. This team also saw the inclusion of Michael Tanner, James Darby, Peter Albee, and Adam Thomas.

== Associations ==
The Australian Capital Territory is made up of 7 Associations;

- Central Canberra Softball Association
- Jerrabomberra Softball Association
- North Canberra Softball Association
- South Tuggeranong Softball Association
- Tuggeranong Softball and Recreation Association
- Woden Valley Softball Association

And one Umpires Association;

- Softball Umpires Association ACT.

== See also ==
- Sport in the Australian Capital Territory
- Australian Softball Federation
- ASF National Championships
