= Victorian Softball Association =

- (Victoria (state))

== Brief history ==
Softball Victoria logo

Softball was first introduced in Victoria during world war 2 by American Servicemen stationed in Melbourne as a way to keep Female nurses fit.

The founding member of the Victorian Softball Association inc. was the Melbourne Softball Association inc. in 1941–42, this was the only member until 1956 when the Sunshine Softball Association inc. was formed by Sergeant McLeod of the Sunshine Police and Mr. Frank O'Brien of the East Sunshine Youth Club.

Some 50 years onwards the Victorian Softball Association inc. has 18 Affiliated members, at its height there was a total of 22 Affiliates.

== Associations ==
- Other Associations
  - Melbourne Softball Association inc. (Formed 1942)
  - Waverley Softball Association inc. (Formed 1966)
  - Wesley College Softball Association (Formed 199?, Un-Affiliated 2002)
- Country Associations
  - Albury Wodonga Softball Association inc. (Formed 19??)
  - Ballarat Softball Association inc. (Formed 19??)
  - Bendigo Softball Association (Formed 19??, Defunct 2002)
  - Horsham Softball Association inc. (Formed 19??)
  - Shepparton & District Softball Association (Formed 19??, Un-Affiliated 19??)
- Gippsland League
  - Bairnsdale Softball Association inc. (Formed 1979, Defunct 2001, Re-Formed 2005)
  - Latrobe Valley Softball Association (Formed 19??, Defunct 1997)
  - Wellington Softball Association inc. (Formed 1996, formerly Sale(Women's)Softball Association formed 1969, in recess 2011)
  - West Gippsland Softball Association (Formed 19??, Defunct 2001)
- North-Western League
  - Geelong Softball Association inc. (Formed 19??)
  - Keilor Park & District Softball Association inc. (Formed 19??)
  - Northern District Softball Association inc. (Formed 1980)
  - Sunbury Softball Association inc. (Formed 19??)
  - Sunshine Softball Association inc. (Formed 1956)
  - Werribee Softball Association inc. (Formed 19??)
- South-Eastern League
  - Casey Softball Association inc. (Formed 1973) (Formerly Berwick City/Berwick Casey)
  - Dandenong Softball Association inc. (Formed 1969)
  - Frankston Softball Association inc. (Formed 19??)
  - Glen Eira Softball Association inc. (Formed 19??) (Formerly Moorabbin)
  - Knox & District Softball Association inc. (Formed 1965)

== See also ==
- Australian Softball Federation
- ASF National Championships
