= Kere Johanson =

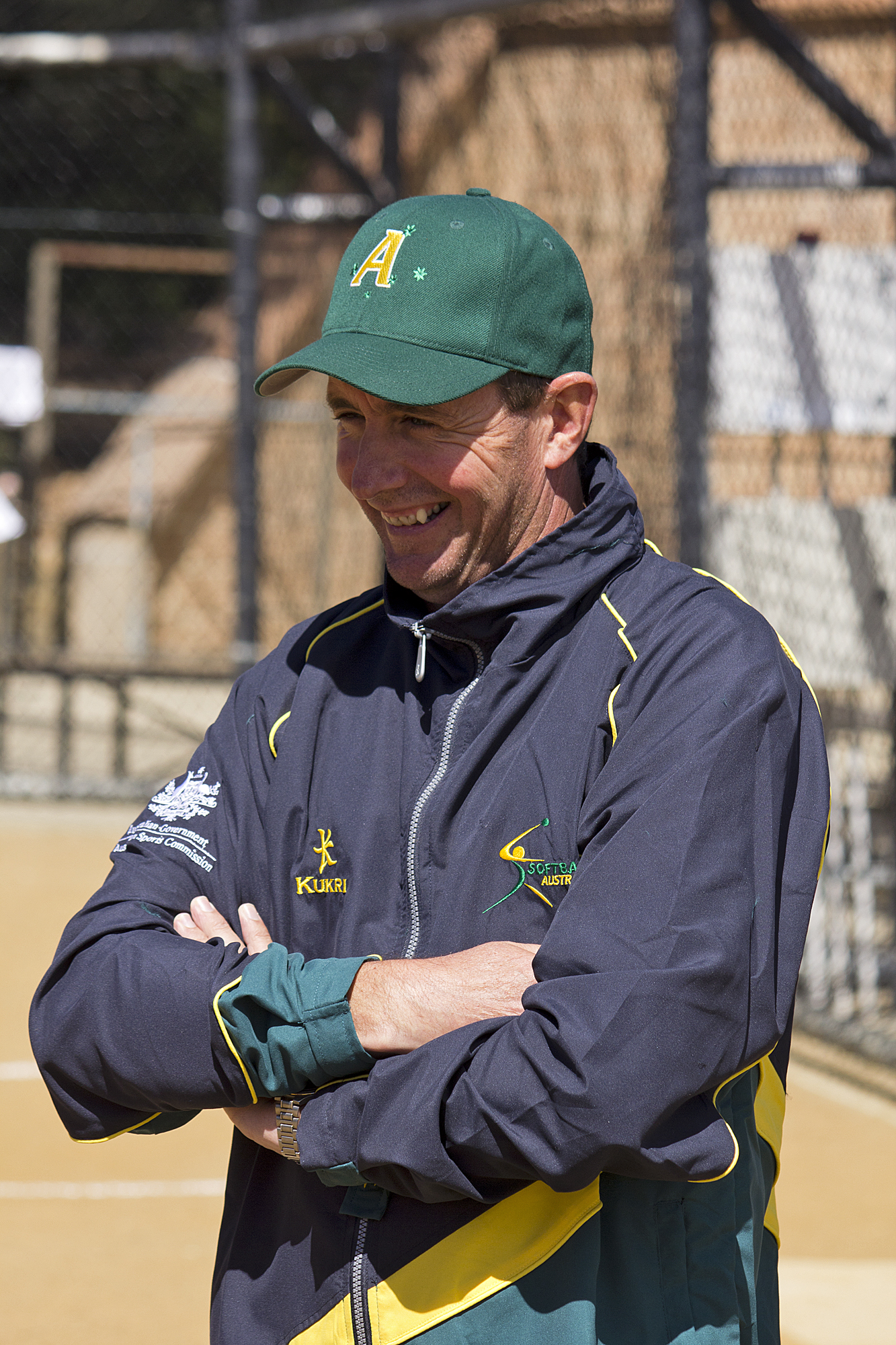
- Johanson in March 2012 during a photoshoot

Sport
- Country: Australia
- Sport: Softball
- Event: Men's/women's team
- Now coaching: Australia women's national softball team

Achievements and titles
- World finals: 1988, 1992, 1996, 2000 men's (as player)

Kere Johanson is a New Zealand men's softball player and coach. He coaches the Australia women's national softball team.

== Personal ==
Johanson, a native New Zealander, resides in Joondalup, Western Australia.

== Softball ==
=== Playing ===
Johanson started playing softball in New Zealand during the 1970s, and played in the infield.

Johanson has played on the New Zealand men's national softball team, and represented them at several world championships including the 1988, 1992, 1996, and 2000 championships. His New Zealand team won the Championships in 1996 and 2000, and finished second in 1988 and 1992. In 2005, he was inducted into the Softball New Zealand Hall of Fame.

In 2002, he was playing club softball for the Western Australian side, Stirling Central. He was with the team when they competed at Australia's national club championships.

=== Coaching ===
Johanson is the coach of the Australia women's national softball team. Previously, he had been an assistant coach on the team, including during their 2004 Summer Olympics appearance. He was named the head coach in 2007 for the University Games teams. He was officially named the head coach of the team in 2011 and will coach for the team that will compete at the 2012 ISF Women's World Championship. His belief as a coach is there is little difference in preparing for a world championship and an Olympic Games. He also believes in an approach that considers on and off field behaviour when it comes to team selection. He coached the team to victory in a January 2012 three-game test series at the Hawker International Softball Centre in Canberra against New Zealand, where the team won 11–4 and 8–0 in two of the games. He was using this series to help evaluate players in the lead-up to the World Championships and for future player development for the 2014 World Cup.

Johanson has also coached the Australia men's national softball team, coaching the side at the 2009 World Championships.

Johanson was appointed the head coach of the Western Australian representative team in 2002 and was affiliated with the Western Australian Institute of Sport in this role until 2009. He coached the team to wins at the 2009 and 2010 Gilleys Shield. In 2009, he was appointed a high-performance softball manager by the Western Australian Department of Sport and Recreation while being based out Softball Western Australia. He continued on in this role in 2010.
