= Nox Bailey Shield =

Champions
- 1989: New South Wales
- 1990: Queensland
- 1991: Victoria
- 1992: Western Australia
- 1993: Queensland
- 1994: New South Wales
- 1995: New South Wales
- 1996: Western Australia
- 1997: New South Wales
- 1998: New South Wales
- 1999: New South Wales
- 2000: New South Wales
- 2001: Australian Capital Territory
- 2002: Australian Capital Territory
- 2003: Australian Capital Territory
- 2004: Australian Capital Territory
- 2005: Victoria
- 2006: Victoria
- 2007: New South Wales
- 2008: Australian Capital Territory
- 2009: Western Australia
- 2010: New South Wales
- 2011: Victoria
- 2012: Queensland
- 2013: Queensland
- 2014: New South Wales
- 2015: New South Wales
- 2016: New South Wales
- 2017: Queensland
- 2018: Queensland
- 2019: Queensland
- 2020: Queensland

The Nox Bailey Shield is a trophy awarded yearly to the Under 19 Men's Champion team of the Australian Softball Federation. It is named after a famous Australian softball organiser.

== About Nox Bailey ==
Nox Bailey's interest in softball grew from conversations he held with a work-mate in the 1960s and led him to set up a competition for local boys and girls in Bayswater, Western Australia.

Successfully negotiating with his local council, Bailey acquired space for four softball diamonds and began taking his teams across the city to compete in a Scarborough competition, which his kids quickly outgrew.

Elected to the Western Australia Softball Association Board as Secretary, Bailey began inquiring about the inclusion of a men's social competition at the next major tournament. By 1976 he had successfully helped to establish the Western Australia Men's Softball League.

Little support was given from the Western Australia Softball Association and the men were restricted to playing on Sunday on sub-standard grounds. As he had done over a decade before, Bailey approached his local council and secured space at Morely and Cooke's reserve to establish appropriate playing diamonds.

In 1978, the first Men's Softball State Championships were held.

Bailey at their urging collaborated with John Reid and Edna Nash of the New South Wales Softball Association in establishing an interstate competition for men in 1983. He joined forces with the eastern state duo again only a few years later as they attempted to introduce an Australian Men's Softball team in the next major international tournament under the ASF banner.

In 1988, Australia debuted in the ISF men's Softball World Championship.

A powerful force behind the development of men's softball in WA and ultimately Australia, and a member of the Bayswater Morley Softball Club for 25 years, Bailey was made a Life Member of the Western Australia Softball Association in 1976. A decade later he received Life Membership of the Western Australia Men's Softball League, to this date he is the only person to have this honour bestowed upon him.

The national under-19 men's softball competition is held for the Nox Bailey Shield.

== Previous Individual Award Winners ==
- 1989
  - Most Valuable Player: Rob Hilton (QLD)
  - Pitching Award: Matthew Van Buuren (NSW)
  - Batting Award: Drew Telfer (NSW)
- 1990
  - Most Valuable Player: Paul Fisher (QLD)
  - Pitching Award: Paul Fisher (QLD)
  - Batting Award: Lewis Wetere (WA)
- 1991
  - Most Valuable Player: Adam Catford (NSW)
  - Pitching Award: Rohan Mullins (VIC)
  - Batting Award: Scott Goodall (WA)
- 1992
  - Most Valuable Player: Richard Barker (WA)
  - Pitching Award: Neil Delpero (WA)
  - Batting Award: Adam Catford (NSW)
- 1993
  - Most Valuable Player: Joshual Davison (NSW)
  - Pitching Award: Neil Delpero (WA)
  - Batting Award: Patrick Brady (NSW)
- 1994
  - Most Valuable Player: Patrick Brady (NSW)
  - Pitching Award: Neil Delpero (WA)
  - Batting Award: Graeme Cooke (WA)
- 1995
  - Most Valuable Player: Barry Scholten (WA)
  - Pitching Award: Adam Sobal (NSW)
  - Batting Award: Jason Bertolini (WA)
- 1996
  - Most Valuable Player: Adam Humble (WA)
  - Pitching Award: Adam Humble (WA)
  - Batting Award: Joshua Bryen (QLD)
- 1997
  - Most Valuable Player: David Ingram (NSW)
  - Pitching Award: Shaun Beckley (NSW)
  - Batting Award: Darcey Byrne (ACT)
- 1998
  - Most Valuable Player: Zelman Tan (NSW)
  - Pitching Award: Adam Lloyd (WA)
  - Batting Award: Zelman Tan (NSW)
- 1999
  - Most Valuable Player: Paul Sheahan (NSW)
  - Pitching Award: Aaron Cockman (WA)
  - Batting Award: Luke Shiels (NSW)
- 2000
  - Most Valuable Player: Joel Southam (NSW)
  - Pitching Award: Scott Norman (NSW)
  - Batting Award: Jeff Goolagong (ACT)
- 2001
  - Most Valuable Player: Adam Thomas (ACT)
  - Pitching Award: James Darby (ACT)
  - Batting Award: Peter Boys (NSW)
- 2002
  - Most Valuable Player: Darren Brewer (QLD)
  - Pitching Award: Andrew Kirkpatrick (ACT)
  - Batting Award: Tim Campbell (NSW)
- 2003
  - Most Valuable Player: Andrew Kirkpatrick (ACT)
  - Pitching Award: David Shearer (NSW)
  - Batting Award: Josh Jones (ACT)
- 2004
  - Most Valuable Player: Glen Rigg (VIC)
  - Pitching Award: Adam Folkard (ACT)
  - Batting Award: Travis Southam (NSW)
- 2005
  - Most Valuable Player: Shaun Mason (VIC)
  - Pitching Award: James Brooks (VIC)
  - Batting Award: Ryan Van Coevorden (NSW)
- 2006
  - Most Valuable Player: James Brooks (VIC)
  - Pitching Award: Andrew Evans (VIC)
  - Batting Award: Jamie Sheehan (NSW)
- 2007
  - Most Valuable Player: (NSW)
  - Pitching Award: Andrew Evans (VIC)
  - Batting Award: Corey Jong (VIC)
- 2008
  - Most Valuable Player: Matt Stafford (ACT)
  - Pitching Award: Brad Riley (ACT)
  - Batting Award: Steven Albee (NSW)

== See also ==
- Australian Softball Federation
- ASF National Championships
