= Laing Harrow Shield =

Champions
- 1998: New South Wales
- 1999
- 2000: New South Wales
- 2001: Hutt City United
- 2002: Australian Capital Territory
- 2003: Australian Capital Territory
- 2004: New South Wales*
- 2005: Australia Under 19s
- 2006: Australian Capital Territory
- 2007: Australian Capital Territory
- 2008: Australian Capital Territory
- * grand final washed out

The Laing Harrow Shield is a trophy symbolizing the Under 23 Men's Championship of the Australian Softball Federation. The Laing Harrow competition was first held in 1997 by the New South Wales Softball Association as an invitational tournament attended by all the east coast states, in 2004 ASF sanctioned the championship in its own bid to bridge the gap between the Under 19 National Championships and Open National Championships, and increase the retention of elite players. The men's under 23 championship was named after Laing Harrow in 2003.

== See also ==
- Australian Softball Federation
- ASF National Championships
- Joyce Lester Shield
