= Tasmanian Softball Council =

Tasmanian Softball Association
- (Tasmania)

== Brief history ==
Tasmanian Softball Council's logo

The Tasmanian Softball Council inc. was formed in 1954, attending their first national championship that same year.

Some 50 years onwards the Tasmanian Softball Council inc. has 4 Affiliated members.

== Yearly events ==
The Tasmanian Softball Council inc. holds a number or annual events;

- State Championships which are held over 3 weekends:
- Weekend 1
  - Under 14 Girls
  - Under 16 Boys
  - Under 19 Women
- Weekend 2
  - Under 14 Boys
  - Under 16 Girls
  - Under 19 Men's
- Weekend 3
  - Open Women (A and B grades)
  - Open Men's

== State teams ==
The Tasmanian Softball Council attends most ASF National Championships

For the 2006 Championships the following was entered

- Under 16 Girls
- Under 16 Boys
- Under 19 Women's
- Under 19 Men's
- The last Open Men's teams was entered in 2005
- The last Open Women's team was entered in 2004
- The last Under 23 Women's team was entered in 2005
- A Under 23 Menas team has never been entered by the Tasmanian Softball Councill

== Associations ==
- Great Northern League
  - Northern Tasmania Softball Association
  - Ulverston Softball Association
- Other Leagues
  - Latrobe Softball Association
  - Southern Tasmania Softball Association

== See also ==
- Australian Softball Federation
- ASF National Championships
