= Kim Cooper =

Kim Cooper may refer to:

- Kim Cooper (softball) (born 1965), Australian softball player
- Kim Cooper (singer), contestant on Australian Idol

== See also ==
- Kimberley Cooper, Australian television actress
