= Richard Vagg =

Australian baseball player (born 1967)

Personal information
- Born: 27 September 1967 (age 57); Melbourne, Victoria, Australia

Sport
- Country: Australia
- Sport: Baseball

Richard Vagg (born 27 September 1967 in Melbourne, Victoria, Australia) is an Australian baseball player. He represented Australia at the 1996 Summer Olympics. Also played for the Melbourne Monarchs in the 1997-98 season.
