= Jason Hewitt (baseball) =

Australian baseball player (born 1974)

Personal information
- Born: 17 September 1974 (age 51) Perth, Western Australia, Australia

Sport
- Country: Australia
- Sport: Baseball

Jason Hewitt (born 17 September 1974) is an Australian former professional baseball infielder and outfielder. He represented Australia at the 1996 Summer Olympics.

== Career ==
Hewitt played one professional season in 1994 with the Duluth-Superior Dukes of the Northern League. In 48 appearances for the Dukes, Hewitt slashed .209/.316/.284 with two home runs, eight RBI, and three stolen bases.
