= Scott Tunkin =

Australian baseball player

Personal information
- Born: 15 June 1974 (age 51) Sydney, Australia

Sport
- Country: Australia
- Sport: Baseball

Scott Tunkin (born 15 June 1974) is an Australian baseball player. He represented Australia at the 1996 Summer Olympics.
