= Joyce Lester Shield =

- Sponsored by: Australian Softball Federation
- Date: 1997

The Joyce Lester Shield is a trophy symbolizing the Under 23 Women's championship of the Australian Softball Federation. The Joyce Lester competition was first held in 1997 to bridge the gap between the Under 19 National Championships and Open National Championships. It is named after Joyce Lester, an Australian softball player and coach.

== Champions ==
- 1997:
- 1998:
- 1999:
- 2000: New South Wales
- 2001: Nittaidai A
- 2002: Queensland
- 2003: New South Wales
- 2004: New South Wales
- 2005: New South Wales
- 2006: Victoria
- 2007: Victoria
- 2008: Victoria

== Previous Individual Award Winners ==
- 2004
  - Most Valuable Player – Nicole Smith (Qld)
  - Pitching Award – Zara Mee (NSW)
  - Batting Award – Casey Williams (NT)
- 2005
  - Most Valuable Player – Tatiana Holodnow (NSW)
  - Pitching Award – Emily Gooding (NSW Country)
  - Batting Award – Tatiana Holodnow (NSW)
- 2006
  - Most Valuable Player -
  - Pitching Award -
  - Batting Award -
- 2007
  - Most Valuable Player -
  - Pitching Award -
  - Batting Award -
- 2008
  - Most Valuable Player -
  - Pitching Award -
  - Batting Award -

== See also ==
- Australian Softball Federation
- ASF National Championships
- Laing Harrow Shield
