= South Australia Softball Association =

Softball governing body

- (South Australia)

== Yearly events ==
- state championships
- state league

== State teams ==
The South Australian Softball Association attends all ASF National Championships

For the 2006 Championships the following was entered

- Under 16 Girls
- Under 16 Boys
- Under 19 Women's – 1st
- Under 23 Women's
- Open Women's

== Associations ==
- Insert Associations

== See also ==
- Australian Softball Federation
- ASF National Championships
