= Shane Tonkin =

Australian baseball player (born 1971)

Personal information
- Born: 12 February 1971 (age 55) Perth, Western Australia
- Height: 6'4

Sport
- Country: Australia
- Sport: Baseball

Shane Tonkin OLY (born 12 February 1971) is an Australian former baseball pitcher. He represented Australia at the 1996 Summer Olympics. He played for Perth Heat in the Australian Baseball League and also in Taiwan, Japan and Italy.
