= Steven Hinton =

Australian baseball player

Personal information
- Born: 5 August 1971 (age 53); Ipswich, Queensland, Australia

Sport
- Country: Australia
- Sport: Baseball

Steven Hinton (born 5 August 1971 in Ipswich, Queensland, Australia) is an Australian baseball player. He represented Australia at the 1996 Summer Olympics.
