= Elinor McKenzie Shield =

Australian U18 softball championship

Champions
- 1974: New South Wales
- 1975: Australian Capital Territory
- 1976: Queensland
- 1977: Australian Capital Territory
- 1978: New South Wales
- 1979: Victoria
- 1980: Queensland
- 1981: New South Wales
- 1982: Queensland
- 1983: Queensland
- 1984: South Australia
- 1985: Victoria
- 1986: New South Wales
- 1987: New South Wales
- 1988: New South Wales
- 1989: Queensland
- 1990: Queensland
- 1991: New South Wales
- 1992: New South Wales
- 1993: Queensland
- 1994: Victoria
- 1995: New South Wales
- 1996: New South Wales
- 1997: Queensland
- 1998: New South Wales
- 1999: New South Wales
- 2000: Queensland
- 2001: New South Wales
- 2002: Queensland
- 2003: New South Wales
- 2004: New South Wales
- 2005: Victoria
- 2006: South Australia
- 2007: New South Wales
- 2008: New South Wales
- 2009: New South Wales
- 2010: New South Wales
- 2011: New South Wales
- 2012: New South Wales
- 2013: New South Wales
- 2014: Queensland
- 2015: South Australia
- 2016: New South Wales
- 2017: New South Wales
- 2018: Queensland
- 2019: New South Wales
- 2020: New South Wales
- 2021: Not played (COVID-19)
- 2022: Queensland
- 2023: New South Wales

The Elinor McKenzie Shield is a trophy symbolizing the Under 18 Women's Championship of Softball Australia.

== History ==
In 1971 Victoria put forward the suggestion to the Australia Federation to stage an invitational tournament for the 18 and under age group to fill the gap between the under 16 and senior championships. The proposal was put forward as a Notice of Motion at the 1972 Assembly meeting. The first 18 and under, conducted as an equivalent event to the open and under 16 events was staged in Melbourne, in 1974. The age group of the championships officially became the under 19 in 1976.

Edna Nash, the then President of the New South Wales Softball Association, traveled to Melbourne to donate the trophy in honour of Elinor McKenzie. Elinor never got to present the trophy, dying from the effects of cancer on the eve of its first presentation on 19 May 1974.

The age group was changed to Under 18 in 2020, to reflect the change made by the World Baseball Softball Confederation to the Junior Women's World Cup age group.

== Elinor McKenzie ==
Joan Elinor McKenzie (14 September 1937 – 19 May 1974) was a captain of the Australian Women's Softball Team. Elinor had a long and proud history in softball, playing more than 25 times for Australia in an International career that spanned some 12 years. She was a member of the Australian team for the first world championship staged in Melbourne in 1965; the competition was then known as the Diamond International Trophy. According to Dr. Lynn Embrey in her account of softball history 'Batter Up!’, in the final against USA, it was Elinor who scored the vital run on a wild pitch from American pitcher Donna Lopiano after hitting a double to centre field as leadoff batter in the bottom of the sixth innings. Her prowess on the softball diamond was well respected throughout the world.

The niece of Australian cricket great Keith Miller, Elinor was a well-respected first base player who not only excelled in softball but also played at representative level in both basketball and cricket. Elinor was a member of the Victorian and Australian Women's Cricket Teams.

As a coach, Elinor showed her ability and the never-give-up attitude that she displayed as a player which was instilled in the young Victorian charges she led to the first under 16 championship hosted by Perth in 1970.

== Previous individual award winners ==
- 2006
  - Most Valuable Player:
  - Pitching Award:
  - Batting Award:

== See also ==
- Australian Softball Federation
- ASF National Championships
