= Verity Long-Droppert =

Australian softball player

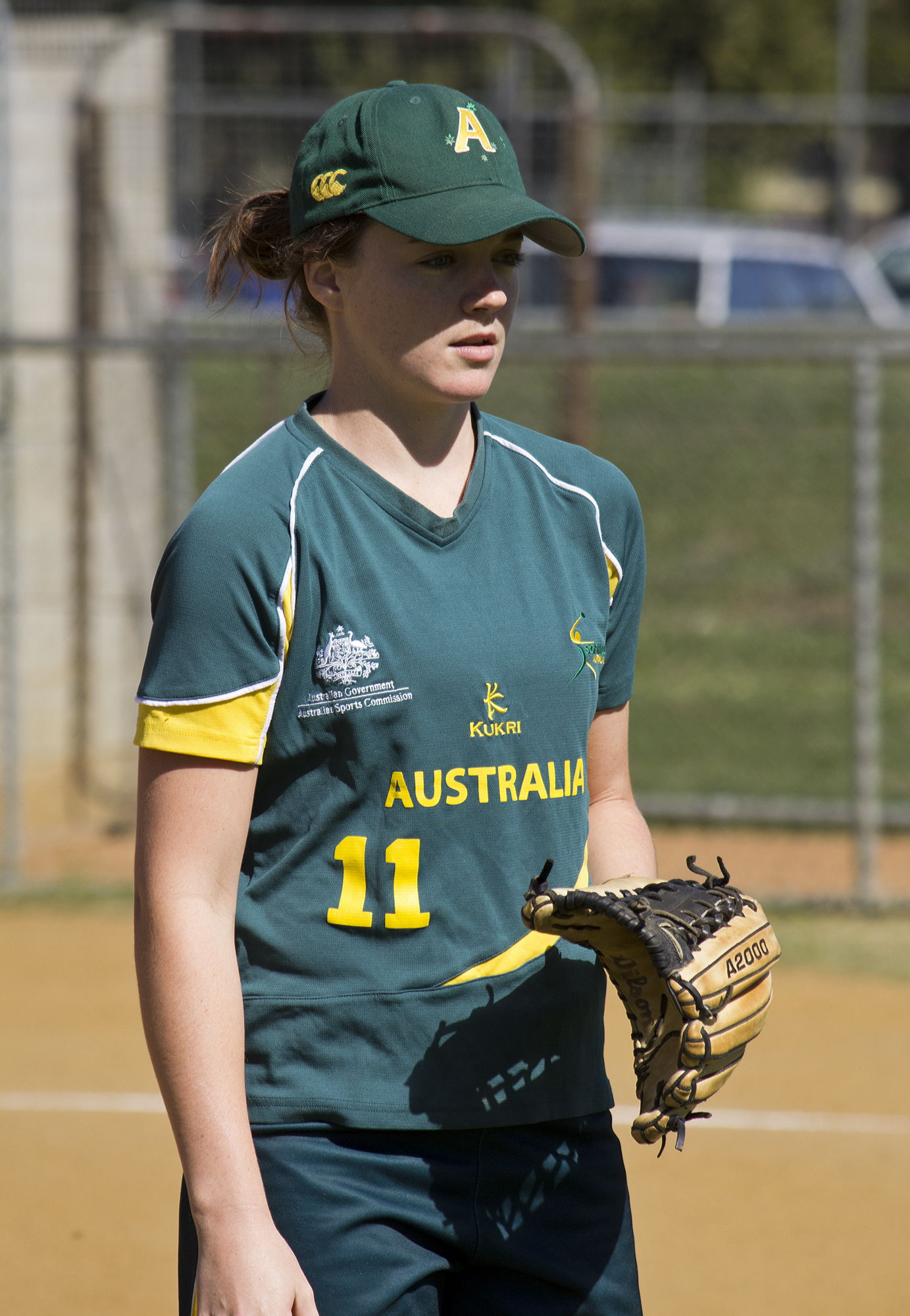
- Long-Droppert in March 2012 during a photoshoot

Sport
- Country: Australia
- Sport: Softball
- Event: Women's team
- Club: Stirling Centrals
- Team: Baseball Softball Club Legnano
- Turned pro: 2010
Medal record
Softball
Representing Australia
ISF Junior Women's World Championships
Bronze medal – third place	2007 Netherlands	Women's team

Verity Long-Droppert is an Australian softball third base man and outfielder. She attended the University of Western Australia. She has held softball scholarships from the Australian Institute of Sport and the Western Australian Institute of Sport. She has represented Australia on the junior and senior levels, and won a bronze medal at the 2007 ISF Junior Women's World Championships. She played professional softball for Baseball Softball Club Legnano.

== Personal ==
Long-Droppert is from Claremont, Western Australia. She played teeball as a youngster. She attended the University of Western Australia and was in her second year in 2007. She majored in arts/law.

== Softball ==
Long-Droppert started playing softball when she was twelve years old, and plays third base and outfield. In 2007 and 2009, she had a scholarship with and played for the Australian Institute of Sport team. She has also had a softball scholarship with and played for the Western Australian Institute of Sport in 2007. She plays club softball for the Stirling Centrals. She has represented Western Australia in national competitions, first making the junior state team when she was fifteen.

=== Junior national team ===
Long-Droppert has been a member of Australia's junior national team. She represented Australia at the 2007 Junior World Championships in the Netherlands. Her team took home a bronze medal. In the semi-final loss to Japan, she was the only player to score a run by crossing home plate. In 2007, as a member of the U19 national team, she also participated in a softball tour of the Netherlands.

=== Senior national team ===
Long-Droppert has represented Australia as a member of the Australia women's national softball team. In 2007, she represented Australia at the World University Games. It was her second time representing Australia at this event. In March 2009, she participated in a Brisbane-based training camp. In 2011, she was a member of the Australian side that competed at the World Cup of Softball. She was a member of the 2012 Australia women's national softball team and earned a spot to compete at the 2012 ISF XIII Women's World Championships. The team secured a bronze medal at the 2012 ISF XIII Women's World Championship in July.

=== Professional team ===
Long-Droppert played professionally for Baseball Softball Club Legnano of the Italian Softball League in 2010 and 2011.
