= Grant Smith (field hockey) =

Australian field hockey player

Personal information
- Born: 20 April 1971 (age 55)
Medal record
Men's Field Hockey
Representing Australia
Olympic Games
Bronze medal – third place	1996 Atlanta	Team competition

Grant Leslie Smith (born 20 April 1971 in Canberra, Australian Capital Territory) is a former field hockey player from Australia, who was a member of the Men's National Hockey Team that won the bronze medal at the 1996 Summer Olympics in Atlanta, Georgia.
