= Jocelyn McCallum =

Australian softball player

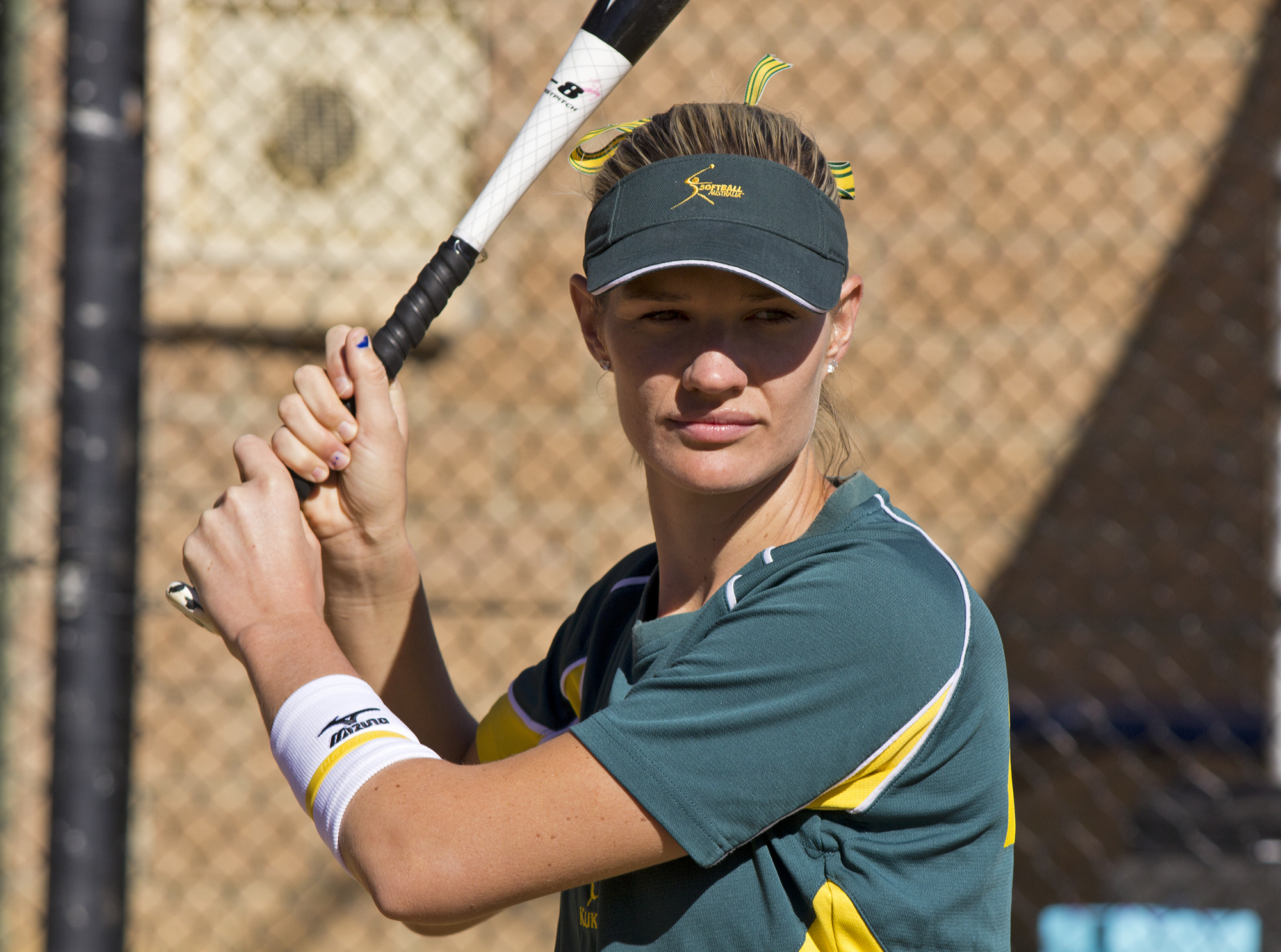
- McCallum in March 2012 during a photoshoot

Personal information
- Nickname: Jossy
- Born: December 1984; Mount Isa, Queensland

Sport
- Country: Australia
- Sport: Softball
- Event: Women's team
- Team: Rhibo LaLoggia

Achievements and titles
- World finals: ISF XIV 2014

Jocelyn McCallum (born December 1984 in Mount Isa, Queensland) is an Australian softball player. She is a pitcher and represents Queensland in state competitions. She has also represented Australia on the junior and senior level. She was close to being selected for the national team that competed at the 2004 Summer Olympics and 2008 Summer Olympics but did not make the final cut. She was selected for the 2012 Australia women's national softball team as a non-travelling reserve. She was a member of the 2014 Australia women's national softball team. She has played professional softball for teams in Europe and the United States.

== Personal ==
McCallum was born in December 1984 in Mount Isa, Queensland. She is from Sunshine Coast, Queensland. While in secondary school, she moved from the Sunshine Coast to the Brisbane suburb of Paddington, Queensland to help her go further in softball.

== Softball ==
McCallum is a pitcher. In 2011, she had a wrist injury but continued to play. The injury involved a bone chip that required surgery and a cortisone injection. In 2002 and 2008, she had a scholarship and played for the Australian Institute of Sport. In 2008, she competed in the Queensland Open Women's State Championships.

McCallum represents Queensland in state competitions as a member of the Queensland Heat. She was a member of the Queensland team in 2008.

McCallum has represented Australia on the junior level. In 2002, she was chosen to represent Australia on the U17 national team. In July of that year, she toured Canada with the side. This was her first appearance on an Australian national team.

=== Senior national team ===
Watching the 2000 Summer Olympics in person made McCallum determined to make the national team. She was in a possible for the 2004 Summer Olympics team. In January 2004, she was named to the Australian Institute of Sport squad and given a scholarship. The team had 25 players and was the one that Olympic selectors would choose from to compete at the Games. She was a member of the national team in 2007 and participated in a six-game test series against China in the Redlands. She almost made the 2008 Summer Olympic team. She was named a reserved member. She was upset when softball was removed from the Olympic programme. She was selected for the 2012 Australia women's national softball team as a non-travelling reserve.

She was a member of the 2014 Australia women's national softball team. She played as a relief pitcher in the 2014 ISF Women's Softball World Championship in Haarlem in the Netherlands. In 11.2 innings played in 7 games she had an earned run average of 0.60, allowing 8 hits, 1 run, and 5 walks, with 17 strike outs.

=== Professional softball ===
McCallum has played for softball teams in Europe and the United States. She signed with an Italian Rhibo LaLoggia side during the 2011/2012 offseason. Previously, she had played for Nuoro in Italy.

== Recognition ==
In May 2002, McCallum was named the Westside News Junior Sports of the Month.
