= Dandenong Softball Association =

Dandenong Softball Association, in 1967 the Lyndale Softball Club was formed when Waverley Softball Association invited Lyndale Primary School to enter a Pixie side into their competition. By the end of the season there were 40 keen, young girls wanting to play softball. Transportation to Jells Park was a problem, so in 1968 it was decided to form a local Association. From this decision the Dandenong School Girls Softball Association was born. Twelve sides were fielded and Lyndale High School was their home ground.

Interest in softball continued throughout 1968 and it was decided to form the Dandenong Softball Association in 1969 as many adults were interested in playing the game in the local area.

On 23 June 1969, Inaugural President Mr Ivan Dunn proposed the motion that “The assembled representatives form a Dandenong Softball Association”.

== The Early Years (1967-1980) ==
=== Original Office Bearers ===
- President: Mr Ivan Dunn
- Vice President: Mrs B Boyle
- Secretary: Mrs M Holt
- Treasurer: Mr Norm Hamilton
- Manager: Mr R Crocombe
- Auditor: Mr R.F.Dunn

=== On the Diamond ===
The First Season saw 25 teams entered across all ages at Lyndale High School with local schools forming clubs (Greenslopes, Lyndale, Power Rd, Heatherhill, Ann St). Chandler Softball Club and Springvale Softball Club were also formed for this season. In the following two years, participation grew to 400 members with 40 teams. At this point, the Dandenong Softball Association decided to affiliate with the Victorian Softball Association and enter teams in State Championships, the first being an Under 17 Girls team.

In 1972 and 1973, participation continued to grow to 680 members with 47 teams. in 1973, Dandenong hosted their first State Championships as part of the Centenary celebrations for the City of Dandenong.

1974 was a watershed year for Dandenong Softball Association with Celia Nixon from Springvale Softball Club becoming the first Dandenong member to be selected in a Victorian Representative Team. This year also saw a decline in membership when the Power Rd Softball Club decided to disband from Dandenong, this led to the formation of the Berwick City Softball Association (now known as Casey Softball Association). Dandenong also issued clearances to allow for the formation of the Moorabbin Softball Association (Now Glen Eira/Moorabbin Softball Association).

Following the example of the Power Rd Club, 9 teams were lost in order to form the Frankston Softball Association in 1975. At this time, it was clear that the current facilities at Lyundale High School would not be able to sustain the growing popularity of softball in the area.

With over 1000 registered members in 1978, the Dandenong Council agrees that a new facility is needed and allocates the area in Police Paddocks on Brady Rd. $50,000 is allocated to upgrade the facilities as well as a pavilion. Dandenong was then awarded as host of the Victorian Open age State Championships that year. Springvale celebrated the relocation with their 5th consecutive A-Grade Women's title.
