= Queensland Softball Association =

Queensland sports association

- (Queensland)

The Queensland Softball Association, now known as Softball Queensland, organises and develops the sport of softball in Queensland, Australia. Founded in 1946 as a women's association, it runs an annual state championship and state league, and attends all ASF National Championships.

== Brief history ==
Softball was played in Brisbane in 1945 at Victoria Park by a group of enthusiastic "youngsters" who had either learnt to play softball at the Bedford Playground in Spring Hill or from the American troops who were camped in the grounds of the Hendra School. Two of the "youngsters" shared their enthusiasm for their new sport with an acquaintance, an American named Mack Gilley, who had also been involved in the softball competition played by the American troops stationed in Brisbane. Mack Gilley was soon umpiring their games at Victoria Park.

In 1946 the Queensland Women's Softball Association was formed with Mack Gilley its president and Mrs Gough, the Secretary/Treasurer. Through his association with the Queensland Baseball Association, Mack Gilley subsequently negotiated to have a softball competition at Perry Park in the summer months while baseball was in recess. Five teams, Laurel White, Laurel Green, Carlton 1 and Carlton 2 and Checkers played in the metropolitan competition. In 1947 the first Australian Women's Championship was held in Brisbane with players and officials from the metropolitan competition representing Queensland at the Championship. The following years would see several players and officials from the metropolitan competition represent Queensland at Australian Women's Championships with the exception of 1948 when there was no Australian Championship and 1952 and 1957 when a Queensland team did not compete. In 1949 the first Australian Women's Team played New Zealand in Melbourne with players and an official from the metropolitan competition representing Australia in the international tournament. The following years would also see several players and officials from the metropolitan competition go on to represent Australia at international tournaments.

Softball numbers increased, games were played at wherever a ground could be found, the competition was administered by the Metropolitan Delegates and Executive Committees of the Queensland Women's Softball Association and in January 1953 the first Intercity Carnival was held in Brisbane, with four teams competing in the Carnival, Brisbane, Ipswich, Maryborough and Townsville. 1954 saw the Intercity Carnival held again in Brisbane with six teams competing, two from Brisbane, Ipswich, Toowoomba, Townsville and Lismore. Two Brisbane teams competed in the Intercity Carnival in Maryborough in 1955 and in Townsville in 1956. Three representative teams (two senior teams and a junior team) competed in the Intercity Carnival in Toowoomba in 1957 and in Cairns in 1958. In 1959 the Intercity Carnival became known as the State Carnival and again three Brisbane representative teams competed in the Carnival in Brisbane.

The following years saw softball continue to grow and the metropolitan competition continue to be administered by the Metropolitan Delegates and Executive Committees of the Queensland Women's Softball Association. The Metropolitan Umpires Committee allocated umpiring, St Johns Ambulance administered first aid, three Brisbane representative teams competed in State Carnivals and a senior and junior representative team competed in the Luchterhand Shield and the Jones Trophy, which were intercity competitions between Toowoomba, Gatton and Maryborough. Softball games were televised on ABC Channel 2 and 1960/61 saw Downey Park the only ground used for the season. The metropolitan competition now had a place it could call home.

=== Brisbane Women's Softball Association ===
In April 1964 plans were put in place to establish a new metropolitan association. In May 1965, at a Special Metropolitan Delegates Committee Meeting of the Queensland Women's Softball Association, the Brisbane Women's Softball Association was formed. The first Annual General Meeting of the Brisbane Women's Softball Association was held in September 1965 and Ruby Robinson was elected as the Patroness, Audrey McLaughlin, President, Keith Burke, Des Knight, Eunice Loff, Merv Lane, P McArthur and J Nixon, Vice Presidents, Vera Burke, Secretary, K McNamara, Assistant Secretary, Elaine Robinson, Treasurer and Dale Woodforth, Assistant Treasurer. Mrs Penwarn became Secretary in January 1966.

Twenty-three clubs affiliated with the Brisbane Women's Softball Association for the 1965/66 season – Athletics, Brisbane Bears, Cannon Hill Stars, Hawks, Inala Carltons, Kedron Park Teachers College, Magpies, Mitchelton Missiles, Mt Gravatt Eagles, Oxley Rockets, Pandas, Panthers, Rebels, Saints, Spiro Tots, Southside Scamps, T-Jets, Tramway Terrors, university, Wildcats, Windsors, Wolves and WRAAC – and 66 teams participated in the competition at Downey Park, Windsor. The Brisbane Umpires Committee allocated umpiring, St Johns Ambulance administered first aid, and three Brisbane representative teams competed in the State Carnival. Brisbane affiliated with the Queensland Women's Softball Association and also hosted the Australian Women's Championship in March 1966. It was reported "that the first season of the BWSA was very successful".

== Yearly events ==
- State championships
- State league

== State teams ==
The Queensland Softball Association attends all ASF National Championships.

For the 2006 Championships the following teams were entered:

- Under 16 Girls
- Under 16 Boys
- Under 19 Women's
- Under 19 Men's
- Under 23 Women's
- Under 23 Men's
- Open Women's
- Open Men's

== See also ==
- Australian Softball Federation
- ASF National Championships
