= John Moore (baseball) =

American baseball player

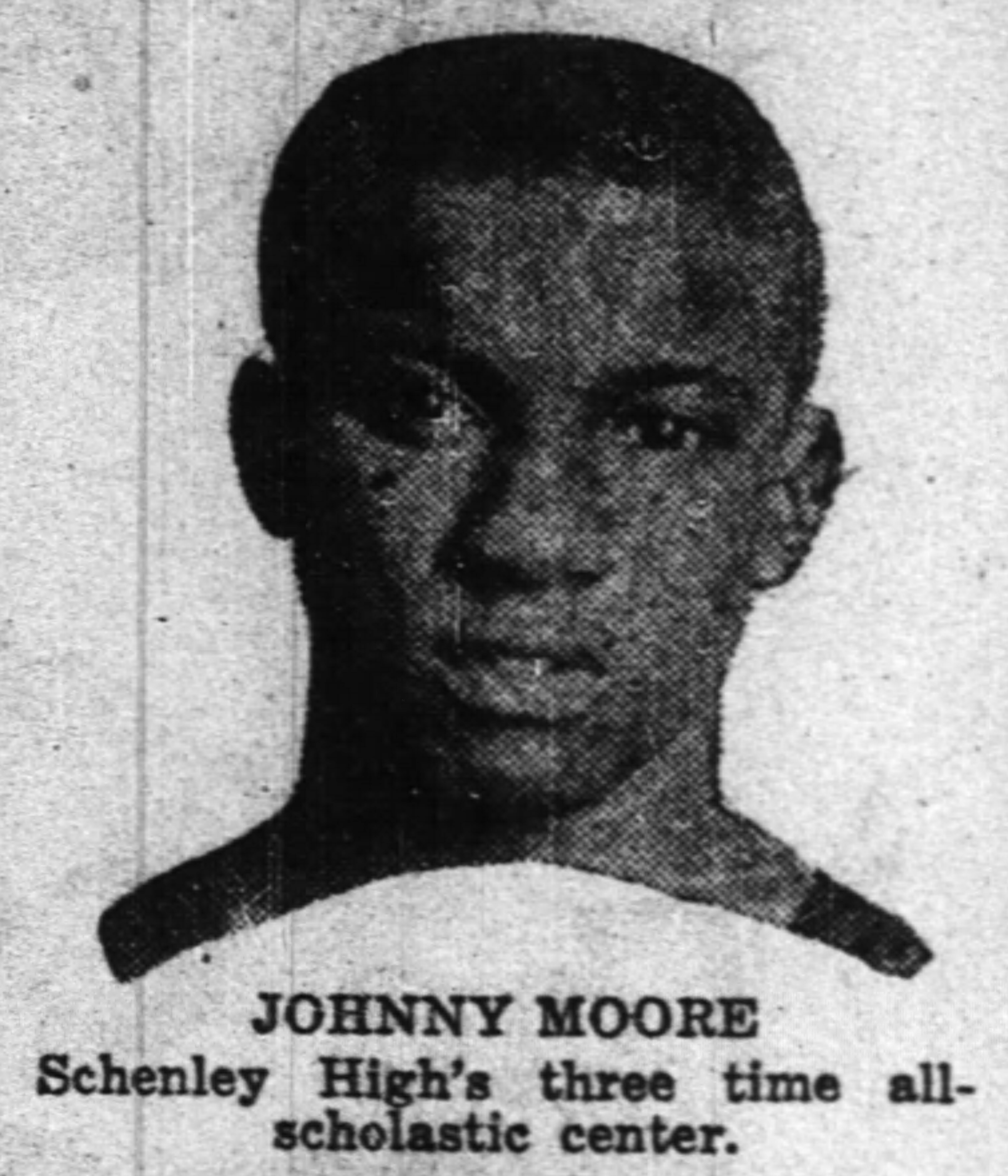
- Other names: Johnny Moore, Judy Moore
- Baseball career
- Infielder

Negro league baseball debut
- 1928, for the Pittsburgh Crawfords

Last appearance
- 1928, for the Homestead Grays

Teams
- Pittsburgh Crawfords (1928); Homestead Grays (1928)
- Basketball career

Career information
- High school: Schenley (Pittsburgh, Pennsylvania)
- Position: Center

John W. Moore was an American multi-sport athlete. He was a Negro league infielder in the late 1920s while also playing professional basketball and semi-professional football.

== Baseball career ==
Moore began his career with the semi-pro Pittsburgh Crawfords in May 1928 as a first baseman. In August, both Moore and third baseman Bill Harris left the club to join the Homestead Grays. One of the two players to fill vacancies of Moore and Harris was Josh Gibson.

== Basketball and football career ==
Moore was a multi-sport athlete. In addition to playing in the Negro leagues, he was an all-city basketball player at Schenley High School in Pittsburgh. He was also selected three times as an all-scholastic center. When he was selected unanimously for the third consecutive year as the best scholastic center in Pittsburgh, The Pittsburgh Courier wrote:

"Considering his youth, his natural athletic abilities and his quick susceptibility to teaching, Johnny undoubtedly will reach the peaks in basketball achievements. A perfect gentleman wherever you meet him, bashful John is an excellent example of the ideal man of tomorrow. If there were only more young athletes with a similar deportment, what a world, what a world this would be."

Moore also played professional basketball for the Loendi Big Five, one of the early black basketball teams known as the Black Fives. He also was a member of the Homestead Grays basketball team in 1927, led by Cumberland Posey, the organizer of the baseball team of the same name, and the Holy Cross Parishioners. Moore won a reputation as "a real offensive threat at all times" who "garnered a large number of baskets." In 1930, he played basketball with the Bailey Bige Five with fellow Negro leaguers Vic Harris and Claude Johnson.

From at least 1934 to 1936, Moore played basketball with the Iron City Elks along with fellow Negro leaguer Joe Ware and future photographer Teenie Harris.

Moore was described by The Pittsburgh Courier in 1936 as "one of the best 'stretch-runners' who ever swept down the hardwoods . . . the left-handed hook artist, who is a clever all-around floorman and one of the finest ponies bred on Smoketown's hills in many moons."

He also played at the quarterback position for the Pittsburgh Crawford's football counterparts, the Garfield Eagles. He also played quarterback in 1931 for the East Liberty Scholastics, described at the time as "Pittsburgh's outstanding grid eleven."
