= Joyce Lester =

Australian softball player and coach

Medal record

Representing Australia

Women's Softball

Olympic Games
Bronze medal – third place	1996 Atlanta	Team

Jocelyn "Joyce" Mavis Lester, OAM (born 22 March 1958) is an Australian softball player and coach. A catcher and outfielder, she joined the Australia women's national softball team in 1977, and captained it from 1985 until its bronze medal win at the 1996 Atlanta Olympics, when she retired from international competition. . She played professionally for the first time in Japan from 1996 to 1999, and thereafter coached softball in both Japan and Australia. She was named to the world all-star softball team in 1986 and 1989, and has been inducted into the Queensland, Australian and world softball halls of fame.

== Personal ==
Lester was born on 22 March 1958 in Brisbane as the youngest of four children. Her mother was a housewife and her father was a firefighter and later a fire brigade officer. She often played softball in the backyard with her sister at home, using a net that her father had built. She attended Geebung State School and Wavell State High School, where she excelled in sport, especially high school softball.

After finishing high school, she attended the North Brisbane College of Advanced Education (now part of the Queensland University of Technology), where she graduated with a Diploma of Teaching and a Bachelor of Education. She later studied for and received a graduate certificate in linguistics from the University of Southern Queensland. She taught physical education full-time during her Australian softball playing career, and as of 2017, she is the Director of International Education at Trinity Anglican School.

Since 1996, she has lived in Cairns with her husband, Chris Wighton, a singer, songwriter and youth worker. They had met in primary school and had a brief relationship after she left high school. They later re-connected in 1996, after he had split up with his ex-wife.

== Career ==
Lester joined the under-16's Queensland softball team as a replacement catcher, after her predecessor had broken her thumb; she had never played in this position before. She was a member of the open Queensland team from 1975 to 1996, captaining it from 1983 onwards. She was part of eight teams that won the Gilleys Shield, seven of which she captained. She was also a member of her club team, the Rebels, which won the national club championships in 1984, 1986 and 1987, and was named Most Valuable Player there in 1990.

She was first selected for the Australia women's national softball team in 1977 and became its captain in 1985. As a catcher and outfielder, she represented her country at 235 international games and five ISF Women's World Championships. At the 1986 world championships in Auckland, she achieved a batting average of .313 and a perfect fielding average of 1000, leading her to be named into the World All Star team. She was once again selected for the all-stars in 1989 after the Intercontinental Cup in Italy. She retired from international competition after the national team's bronze medal win at the 1996 Atlanta Olympics.

In 1996, she signed up with Sagawa, a Japanese softball club near Kyoto, the first time she had played the game professionally. She coached the game in Japan from 2000 to 2004, and was the Far North Queensland softball coach for the Queensland Academy of Sport from 1998 to 2008.

She has served on the International Softball Federation Athletes Commission and has been the Australian players' representative at the International Softball Congress three times. She was a softball commentator at the 2000 Sydney, 2004 Athens, and 2008 Beijing Olympics. She has advocated for greater funding and resources for women's sport, and has suggested that mothers should take their children to see women playing sport more often.

== Recognition ==
Lester was inducted into both the Australian and Queensland softball halls of fame in 1996. In 2000, she received a Medal of the Order of Australia and an Australian Sports Medal, and was inducted into the Sport Australia Hall of Fame. She was inducted into the World Softball Hall of Fame in 2001. The Joyce Lester Shield, Softball Australia's under-23 women's championship, is named after her.
