= Matthew Sheldon-Collins =

Australian baseball player

Personal information
- Born: 13 April 1963 (age 62) Melbourne, Victoria, Australia

Sport
- Country: Australia
- Sport: Baseball

Matthew Keith Sheldon-Collins (born 13 April 1963) is an Australian baseball player. He represented Australia at the 1988 and 1996 Summer Olympics.
