= Francine McRae =

Australian softball player

Medal record

Representing Australia

Women's Softball

Olympic Games
Bronze medal – third place	1996 Atlanta	Team

Francine McRae (born 27 April 1969) is a softball player from Australia, who won a bronze medal at the 1996 Summer Olympics.
