= Carolyn Crudgington =

Australian softball player

Medal record

Representing Australia

Women's Softball

Olympic Games
Bronze medal – third place	1996 Atlanta	Team

Carolyn Crudgington (born 18 August 1968 in Brisbane, Australia) was a softball player from Australia, who won a bronze medal at the 1996 Summer Olympics.
