= Haylea Petrie =

Australian softball player

Medal record

Representing Australia

Women's Softball

Olympic Games
Bronze medal – third place	1996 Atlanta	Team

Haylea Petrie (born 5 July 1969 in Wee Waa, New South Wales) is a softball player from Australia, who won a bronze medal at the 1996 Summer Olympics.

Haylea was player number #144 and played 221 games for Australia. A right handed outfielder and one of the most dangerous batters in the world. Her aggression in the batting box always kept opposition pitchers on their toes.

In 1998, Haylea lead the Australian softball team to one of their biggest wins in over a decade, with a Grand Slam Homerun over the defending World champions, the USA.

Haylea was an Australian Softball representative from 1986 - 2000. In 1986, Haylea represented the U/19s Australian Softball team that toured White Rock in Canada as an invitational team for the World Series. Haylea was the only Australian player to make the Open's World All Stars team. This made Haylea one of the top nine players in the world.

She was a member of the Australian Institute of Sport from 1986 - 2000.

A member of the Queensland Academy of Sport from 1991 - 2000.

A Queensland Open Women's Softball representative from 1988 - 2000 and was Vice Captain in 1997, 1998, 1999 and 2000.

Captain/Coach of Brisbane Saints A1 team from 1994 - 2000. (Won premiership 1996/1997. First time in 17 years.

Brisbane Diamonds National Fastpitch Team from 1992 - 2000.

NSW softball representative from 1982 - 1987.

NSW combined high schools softball representative from 1982 - 1987. Haylea was awarded the very prestigious award of a NSW Blue two times.

AWARDS

1992/1993/1996/1997 Most Valuable Player, National Fastpitch Softball League.

1992/1996/1997 Best Batting Award, National Fastpitch Softball League.

1996/1997 All Stars Team - National Fastpitch Softball League.

1996/1997 Most Valuable Player - Australian Club Championships

1994/1995 Most Valuable Player - Brisbane Softball, June Spice Medal.

1992/1993 Most Home Runs, Most Catches, Most Runs Batted In (RBI's) and Best Batter Award - National Fastpitch Softball competition.

INTERNATIONAL AWARDS

1989 World All Stars Team, South Pacific Classic, New Zealand.

1992 Best Batter, Named in All Stars Team, Most Valuable Player - Alpha Sports Team Tournament, Vancouver, Canada.

1998 World All Stars Team, South Pacific Classic, New Zealand.

2005 Softball Australia Hall of Fame

2013 International Softball Federation Hall of Fame

INTERNATIONAL TOURNAMENT HIGHLIGHTS.

1988 Bicentennial, Brisbane

1989 South Pacific Classic, Sydney

1989 Intercontinental Cup, Italy

1990 New Zealand v Australia - New Zealand

1990 VII Women's Softball World Championship, Normal, USA

1993 Canada Cup

1993 Connecticut and Pennsylvania Tournament

1993 Longstreth Tournament

1994 South Pacific Classic, Sydney

1994 Port Perry Tournament

1994 VIII Women's Softball World Championship, St John's, Canada

1995 USA Series

1995 Pre Olympic Tournament, Columbus, Georgia, USA Canada Cup, White Rock, British Columbia, Canada.

1996 Chinese Taipei Series

1996 Four Nations Tournament

1996 Asian Tour

1996 Los Angeles Tour

1996 Summer (July) Olympic Games, Atlanta, USA - BRONZE MEDAL.

1997 Tri-series, Oklahoma City (July) - GOLD MEDAL.

1997 Superball Series, Columbus, USA, (July) - GOLD MEDAL.

1997 New Zealand v Australia series

1997 Qantas Challenge

1998 South Pacific Classic, New Zealand, (February) - SILVER MEDAL

1998 Canada Cup, Vancouver, (June) - GOLD MEDAL

1998 World Series, Japan (July) - SILVER MEDAL

1999 DeBilt Challenge Series, Holland (May) - GOLD MEDAL

1999 Canada Cup, Vancouver (June) - SILVER MEDAL

1999 Japan Cup, Japan (August) - BRONZE MEDAL

1999 New Zealand Test Series, Sydney (September) - GOLD MEDAL

1999 Trans-Tasman Challenge

2000 Brisbane International Challenge

INTERNATIONAL SCHOLARSHIPS

1992 Alpha Sports Open Team - Awarded Best Batter, Awarded Most Valuable Player of the League, Named in the All Stars Team

1993/1994 White Rock Renegade Senior Team

1997 Redding California (June - August)
