= Western Australia Softball Association =

- (Western Australia)

== History ==
Softball in Western Australia first gathered interest in 1947 after an exhibition match with ex-US servicemen led to a competition being created, which expanded in 1948. WASA was formally established the following year in 1949 as WAWSA (Western Australian Women's Softball Association). At 17, Val Johnston was the first president of the Association. The six foundation clubs were the WA Women's Flying Club, American Club, Liberal League, Victoria Park, Wembley and the National Catholic Girls Movement. The Caris Brothers A Grade Perpetual Trophy was competed for in the first 2 initial seasons, however in 1949, the competition was expanded to A and B grade. By 1950, C grade was included and the following season saw A Reserve and D grade introduced as well.

Western Australia sent their first team to compete in the Gilley's Shield in 1951.

The first games were played at Wellington Square East Perth, moving to Langley park in the early 1950s. By the mid 70's, the competition had expanded to play at Yokine Reserve.

On 22 September 1991 WASA's very own purpose-built facility was opened, and is currently the headquarters for softball in WA located at Lot 27 Chesterfield Road Mirrabooka (opposite Herb Graham Recreation Centre). WASA has in excess of 100 member clubs including approximately 40 metropolitan clubs and 30 country affiliates spanning the vast areas of WA. In total Softball has in excess of 4,000 playing members

== State teams ==
The Western Australia Softball Association attends all ASF National Championships

For the 2006 Championships the following was entered

- Under 16 Girls
- Under 16 Boys
- Under 19 Women's
- Under 19 Men's
- Under 23 Women's
- Under 23 Men's
- Open Women's
- Open Men's

== Associations ==
Metropolitan

Perth Softball Leagues

Dale Districts

South East Metropolitan Softball Association

Rockingham City Softball Association

Southern Districts Softball Association

Canning Softball Association

== See also ==
- Australian Softball Federation
- ASF National Championships
