= Kim Cooper (softball) =

Australian softball player

Personal information
- Born: 26 October 1965 (age 60) Parramatta, New South Wales
- Height: 170 cm (5 ft 7 in)
- Weight: 66 kg (146 lb)
Medal record
Women's softball
Representing Australia
Olympic Games
Bronze medal – third place	1996 Atlanta	Team

Kim Cooper (born 26 October 1965 in Parramatta) is an Australian former softball player who won a bronze medal at the 1996 Summer Olympics.
