= John Reid Shield =

The John Reid Shield is a trophy symbolising the Men's Open Championship of the Softball Australia organisation (formerly known as the Australian Softball Federation). It is named after New Zealand born state umpire John Reid who was also an internationally recognised reporter on the sport of softball.

== 2006 Shield Write-up ==
ACT have taken out the 2006 John Reid Shield earlier this evening being played at the Black Town Olympic Park Stadium.

ACT defeated Queensland 7–2 in the Championship Game, Dominated by ACT lefty Andrew Kirkpatrick, Striking out 14 batters and giving up only two runs. ACT went through the weeks play only dropping one game the defending Victorian team(7-4). Queensland produced the upset of the Championship defeating defending Champions Victoria 7–5 in a 'Home Run Derby' style game to make the Championship game, Veteran Terry Downes provided well with the bat over the weeks play combined with the strong pitching performances from David Metekingi.

Victoria went away confident of a back to back to back performance only losing 2 games going into the final series with the strongest Victorian team in recent times, only to go down to ACT 3-1 then Queensland 7–5, resulting in a disappointing 3rd position.

Western Australia with an ageing team were unable to go past the first game of the finals series going down to Queensland 3–0 in a game dominated by Queensland Pitcher David Metekingi, West Australian Pitcher Adam Humble put in a solid performance to hold Queensland to 3 runs after the 3rd innings.

New South Wales went away with a young inexperienced team at the open level, and only conceding 47 runs to their 42.

South Australia returned to National Competition for the first time in 2 years, with valuable contributions from New South Wales pick-up pitcher Chris Nash, however this was not enough for the overwhelmed South Australian Team inexperienced at this level of competition, finishing the week in 6th position.

Tasmania was absent from this year Championship due to a number of players being unavailable.

Finals Standings

- 1. Australian Capital Territory, 11 wins, 1 loss.
- 2. Queensland, 6 wins, 5 losses.
- 3. Victoria, 8 wins, 4 losses.
- 4. Western Australia, 4 wins, 7 losses.
- 5. New South Wales, 4 wins, 7 losses.
- 6. South Australia, 0 wins, 11 losses.

Championship Awards

- Best Batter:Jason Nathan (QLD)
- Best Pitcher: Andrew Kirkpatrick (ACT)
- Most Valuable Player: Andrew Kirkpatrick (ACT)
- Rookie of the Year: Andrew Titteron (WA)

== Winners ==
- 1984: Western Australia
- 1985: Western Australia
- 1986: Western Australia
- 1987: Western Australia
- 1988: Western Australia
- 1989: Australian Capital Territory
- 1990: Australian Capital Territory
- 1991: Western Australia
- 1992: Western Australia
- 1993: Australian Capital Territory
- 1994: New South Wales
- 1995: Queensland
- 1996: A.C.T.
- 1997: Western Australia
- 1998: Western Australia
- 1999: Victoria
- 2000: Victoria
- 2001: Australian Capital Territory
- 2002: Queensland
- 2003: Australian Capital Territory
- 2004: Victoria
- 2005: Victoria
- 2006: Australian Capital Territory
- 2007: Australian Capital Territory
- 2008: Australian Capital Territory
- 2009: Australian Capital Territory
- 2010: Western Australia
- 2011: Australian Capital Territory
- 2012: Australian Capital Territory
- 2013: Australian Capital Territory
- 2014: Australian Capital Territory
- 2015: Australian Capital Territory
- 2016: New South Wales
- 2017: Australian Capital Territory
- 2018: New South Wales
- 2019: Australian Capital Territory
- 2020: Australian Capital Territory
- 2021: Cancelled
- 2022: New South Wales
- 2023: New South Wales
- 2024: Australian Capital Territory
- 2025: Australian Capital Territory

== Previous Individual Award Winners ==
- 2006
- Most Valuable Player - Andrew Kirkpatrick (ACT)
- Rookie of the Year - Brett Titteron (WA)
- Best Pitcher - Andrew Kirkpatrick (ACT)
- Best Batter - Jason Nathan (QLD)

== See also ==
- Australian Softball Federation
- ASF National Championships
