= Softball Australia =

- Sport: Softball
- Jurisdiction: Australia
- Founded: 1938
- Affiliation: World Baseball Softball Confederation
- Regional affiliation: Oceania Softball Confederation
- (Australia)

Australia's softball history began in 1939 when Gordon Young, Director of Physical Education in NSW, began to promote the game in schools and colleges. In 1942, during World War II, US army sergeant William Duvernet organised softball as a recreation for US nurses stationed in Victoria. Another American, Mack Gilley, introduced the game to Queensland in 1946. Australia's first inter-state championship was played in Brisbane in 1947 and was won by Victoria. The second national championship was held in Melbourne two years later. It was at this championship that the Australian Softball Federation was formed with Queensland, Victoria, South Australia and New South Wales being the founding members. The other States of Australia have since joined. Eight Australian Championships are now conducted each year – Women's, Men's, Under 23 Women and Men, Under 19 Women and Men, and Under 16 Girls and Boys. Softball has been a major sport in the schools program for some time now and it is estimated that more than 250,000 children play the game each year.

== State bodies ==
- ACT – Australian Capital Territory Softball Association inc. (formed 1961)
- NSW – New South Wales Softball Association inc. (formed 1940)
- NT – Northern Territory Softball Association (formed 19??)
- QLD – Queensland Softball Association inc. (formed 1946)
- SA – South Australia Softball Association inc. (formed 1944)
- TAS – Tasmanian Softball Council inc. (formed 1954)
- VIC – Victorian Softball Association inc. (formed 1942)
- WA – Western Australia Softball Association inc. (formed 1949)

== National Championships ==
Each year the Australian Softball Federation holds 8 National Championships. These are hosted by the various state bodies around Australia on a rotational roster.

CHAMPIONSHIPS

- Under 16 Girls – Esther Deason Shield
- Under 16 Boys – Arthur Allsopp Shield
- Under 18 Women's – Elinor McKenzie Shield
- Under 18 Men's – Nox Bailey Shield
- Under 23 Women's – Joyce Lester Shield
- Under 23 Men's – Laing Harrow Shield
- Open Women's – Gilleys Shield
- Open Men's – John Reid Shield

== See also ==
- International Softball Federation
- ASF National Championships
- Sport in Australia
