= New South Wales Softball Association =

Softball governing body

- Headquarters: 81 Eastern Road, Rooty Hill, New South Wales
- President: Chris Hall
- Website: nsw.softball.org.au

New South Wales Softball Association oversees softball throughout New South Wales, Australia. They run a number of leagues and also have teams compete in the national competitions.

== Yearly events ==
- State Championships
- State League

== State teams ==
The New South Wales Softball Association attends all ASF National Championships

For the 2006 Championships the following was entered:

- Under 16 Girls
- Under 16 Boys
- Under 19 Women's
- Under 19 Men's
- Under 23 Women's
- Under 23 Men's
- Open Women's
- Open Men's

== Associations ==
Campbelltown & District Softball Association Division: Southern Metropolitan Website: http://www.campbelltown.softball.net.au Grounds: Milton park

Central Coast Softball Association Division: Northern Metropolitan Website: https://www.revolutionise.com.au/centralcoastsoftball/ Grounds: 29 Passage Road, Bateau Bay. NSW 2261

Cumberland Nepean Softball Association Division Northern Metropolitan Website: http://www.cumberland.softball.net.au Grounds: International Peace Park & Stanhope Gardens

Georges River Softball Association Division Southern Metropolitan Website http://www.georgesriver.softball.net.au Ground Kelso Park Softball Complex

Hawkesbury Softball Association Division Northern Metropolitan Website http://www.hawkesbury.softball.net.au

Hornsby District Softball Association Division Northern Metropolitan Website http://www.hornsby.softball.net.au Ground Hayes Park, Galston

Illawarra District Softball Association Division Southern Metropolitan Website http://www.illawarra.softball.net.au Ground Albion Park Oval, Albion Park Rail & Reed Park, Dapto

Softball Macarthur Division Southern Metropolitan Website http://www.macarthur.softball.net.au Ground Cowpasture Reserve, Argyle Street, Camden

Manly Warringah Softball Association Division Northern Metropolitan Website http://www.mwsa.com.au Ground Abbot Road, Harbord

Newcastle & District Softball Association Division Northern Metropolitan Website http://www.newcastle.softball.net.au Ground Stevenson Park, Stevenson Ave, Mayfield West

North Shore District Softball Association Division Northern Metropolitan Website http://www.northshore.softball.net.au Ground William Cowan Oval, St Ives Village Green, Bryce Oval, St Ives

Penrith City Softball Association Division Southern Metropolitan Website http://www.penrith.softball.net.au Ground Surveyors Creek Softball Facility, Glenmore Park

Southern Districts Softball Association Division Southern Metropolitan Website http://www.southerndistrictsnsw.softball.net.au Ground Jacquie Osmond Softball Centre

Sutherland Shire Softball Association Division Southern Metropolitan Website http://www.sutherland.softball.net.au Ground Captain Cook Reserve, Woolooware

Country Affiliates

Camden Haven/Port Macquarie Softball Association Division Northern Country Ground Finlay Park, Port Macquarie

Coffs Harbour Softball Association Division Northern Country Ground Rugby Park, Toormina

Far North Coast Softball Association Division Northern Country Website http://www.fnc.softball.net.au Ground Albert Park

Inverell Softball Association Division Northern Country Ground McIntrye Park, Inverell

Lower Clarence Softball Association Division Northern Country Ground Wherett Park, Maclean

Macleay Valley Softball Association Division Northern Country Ground Kemp Street Fields, Kempsey

Manning River Softball Association Division Northern Country

Mudgee Softball Association Division Southern Country Website http://www.mudgee.softball.net.au Ground Mudgee

Orange & District Softball Association Division Southern Country Website http://www.orange.softball.net.au Ground Sir Jack Brabham Park, Orange

Singleton Softball Association Division Northern Country Ground Rose Point Park, Singleton

Southern Highlands Softball Association Division Southern Country Ground OLSH, Centennial Rd, Bowral

Tamworth Softball Association Division Northern Country Website http://www.tamworth.softball.net.au Ground Riverside Park, Carter Street, Tamworth

Tweed District Softball Association Division Northern Country Website http://www.tweed.softball.net.au Ground Piggabeen Regional Sports Complex

Wagga Wagga Softball Association Division Southern Country Website http://www.waggawagga.softball.net.au Ground French Fields, Walteela Avenue

== See also ==
- Australian Softball Federation
- ASF National Championships
