= ASF National Championships =

Australian softball competitions

Softball Australia logo

Each year Softball Australia holds eight National Championships. These are hosted by the various state bodies around Australia on a rotational roster.

In 2006 over 800 people participated in these championship, with every state and territory entering at least one team.

== Championships ==
- Under 16 Girls – Esther Deason Shield
- Under 16 Boys – Arthur Allsopp Shield
- Under 19 Women's – Elinor McKenzie Shield
- Under 19 Men's – Nox Bailey Shield
- Under 23 Women's – Joyce Lester Shield
- Under 23 Men's – Laing Harrow Shield
- Open Women's – Gilleys Shield
- Open Men's – John Reid Shield

== See also ==
- Softball Australia
