= Softball in the Australian Capital Territory =

Softball is played in the Australian Capital Territory. The game was influenced early in its history in the territory by Queanbeyan. There are efforts to increase participation in the sport in the ACT. The territory has won the Gilleys Shield three times in a row. Players from Canberra have been on the national team, held Australian Institute of Sport scholarships and played for American universities.

== History and governance ==
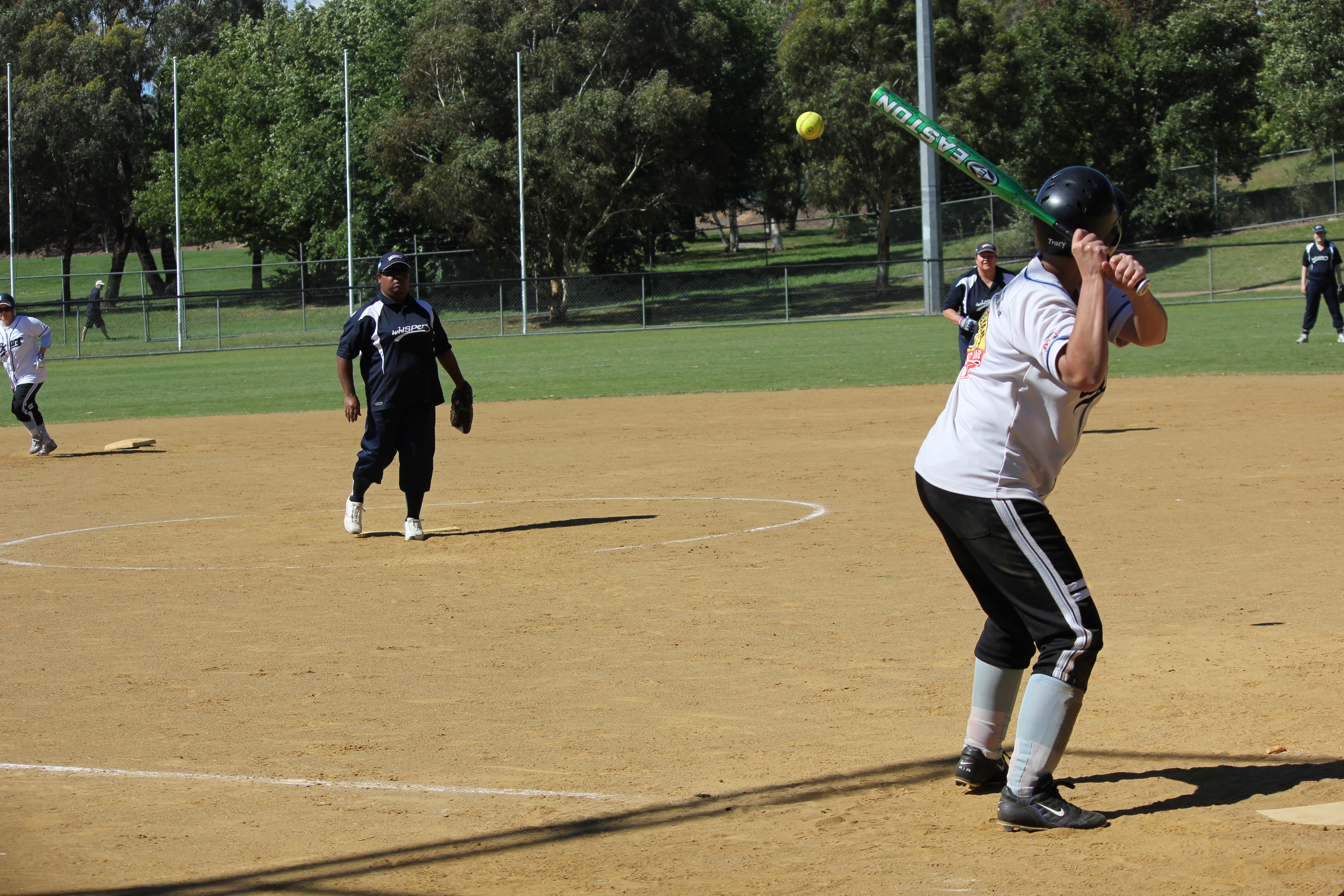
A club semifinal game between two ACT based teams

Softball saw a "benefit" in the bombing of Darwin and the inclusion of Australia in World War II in terms of bringing in American military personnel who brought softball with them to this territory. Softball was being played in the Australian Capital Territory by the mid-1950s with the sport being heavily influenced by the community in Queanbeyan and elsewhere in New South Wales. When efforts began to try to create a territory-based organisation in the mid-1950s, they initially tried to have Queanbeyan included inside the ACT as the two are very close geographically, with teams from the area competing against each other. In 1960, the national association investigated whether or not a territory based association could be accepted into the national organisation based on the constitution. They sent the question to the organisation's lawyers to attempt to resolve the query. The following year, women from the ACT were informally admitted while they awaited a legal answer. In 1961, the Australian Capital Territory state softball federation aligned itself with the Australian Women's Softball Council. In 1971, there were 27 teams affiliated with the territory organisation, 169 in 1975, 175 in 1976, 208 in 1977, 267 in 1978, 350 in 1983 and 338 in 1984.

== Participation ==
The state association is involved with Softball Australia's Play Ball programme and is working to increase junior participation in the sport in the territory. In order to grow indigenous Australian participation, a programme has been set up in the territory called whISPers which make it easier for people to participate in the sport.

== National championships ==
=== Gilleys Shield ===
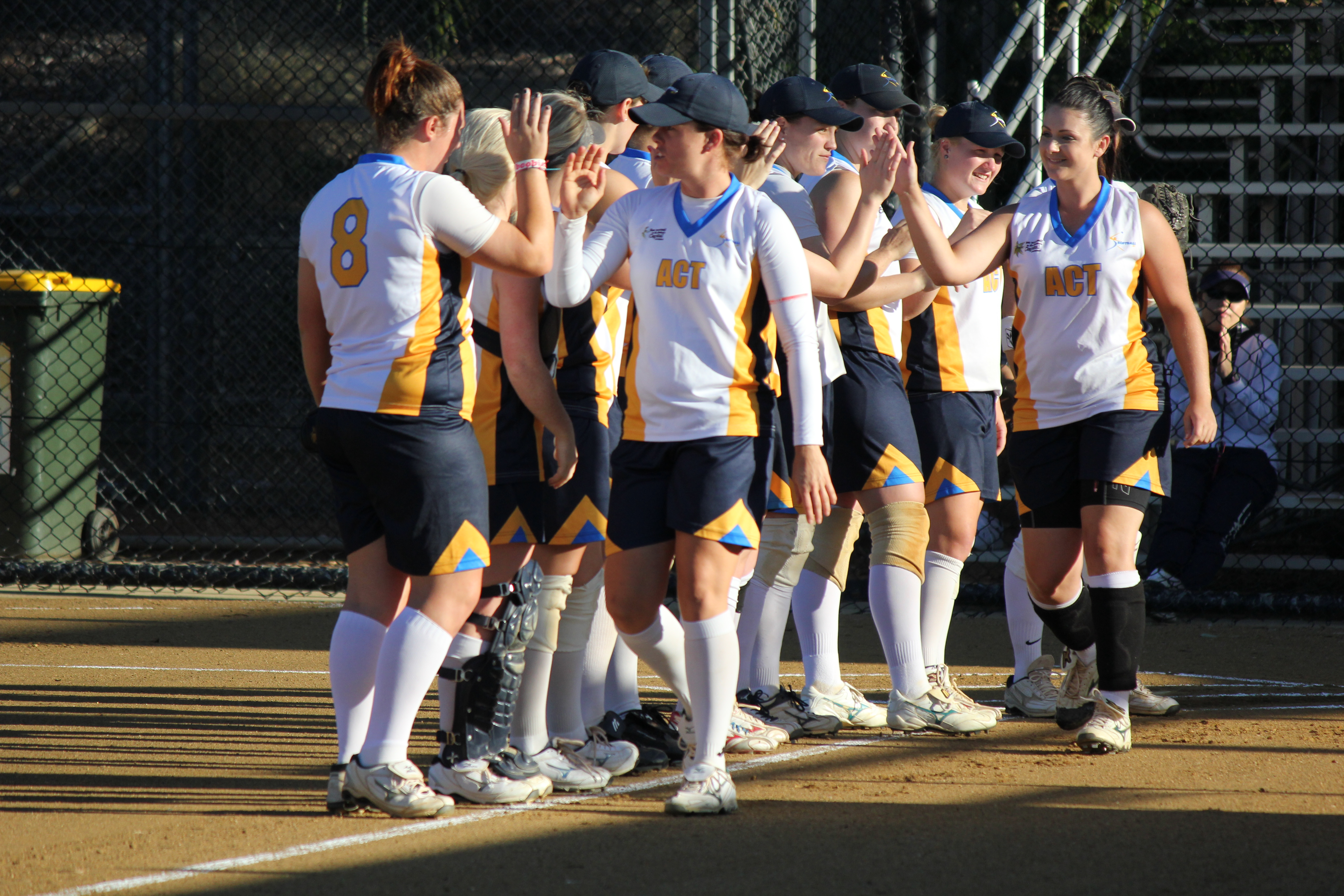
The ACT team getting introduced before a friendly against Japan in March 2012 in Canberra

The territory hosted the Mack Gilley Shield in Canberra in 1965. Between 1947 and 1968, the Territory did not win the Mack Gilley Shield. They finally broke their losing streak by winning in 1978, 1979 and 1980. They did not win again between 1981 and 1994. Women's open team members who represented the Australian Capital Territory at the 2011 Mack Gilley Shield include Brenda De Blaes. Women's open team members who represented the Australian Capital Territory at the 2012 Mack Gilley Shield include Brenda De Blaes.

== Players from the ACT ==
=== National team representatives ===
Members of the 2011 Australia women's national softball team from the Australian Capital Territory include Brenda De Blaes, Clare Warwick and Aimee Murch. Members of the 2012 Australia women's national softball team from the Australian Capital Territory include Brenda De Blaes and Aimee Murch.

=== Australian Institute of Sport scholarship holders ===
The Australian Institute of Sport first awarded softball scholarships in 1993, after the 1991 announcement that softball would be included on the programme for the 1996 Summer Olympics. Since then, several competitors from this territory have been awarded scholarships including Sally McDermid and Joanne Brown in 1993.

=== American university players ===
Some softball players from this territory have played softball for American universities, which depleted the level of high-quality players available for local, state and international competitions. They include Joanne Brown née Alchin, who played for the University of California at Los Angeles starting in 1991.

== Aboriginal participation ==
On 23 March 2012, a youth girls aboriginal team from the territory participated in an exhibition match against New South Wales before the announcement of a national programme to increase aboriginal participation in the sport of softball.

== Men's softball ==
In 1982, there were 0 men's open teams in the Australian Capital Territory.

== See also ==
- Softball Australia
- Softball in Australia
