= Softball in Tasmania =

Softball is played in Tasmania. The game was brought to the island during the late 1940s from Melbourne, Victoria. The sport would grow in popularity in Tasmania with 56 teams in 1976 to 216 in 1984. Men's softball is not popular in Tasmania. The first softball only facility was built in Tasmania in 1984.

== History and governance ==
Softball saw a "benefit" in the bombing of Darwin and the inclusion of Australia in World War II in terms of bringing in American military personnel who brought softball with them to this state. Softball was introduced to Tasmania by men during the 1940s by Ken Thomas of Hobart and George Russell of Devonport. The pair learned to play the game in Melbourne, Victoria while working for the National Fitness Council. By 1949, Thomas was serving as the Tasmanian Director of the National Fitness Council and used his position to advance the sport in the state. Softball was included in physical education classes during this period. This led to the formation of club teams affiliated with schools. One of the earliest such clubs was the Moonah Modern School's Dodgers. In 1949, they won the first Tasmanian schools championships. Students would also create clubs when they graduated, including the Ogilversians team founded by former students at Ogilvie High School. Most of this activity was based around Hobart. A Tasmanian delegation was invited to participate in a softball carnival being held in 1949 in Melbourne. Softball reached Devonport by 1949 with a local association created that year by George Russell, who was supported by the National Fitness Council. The first Devonport league had six teams competing in it. Softball had problems getting support in Launceston, Tasmania as the game had to compete with vigoro, with the popularity of the sport in the city continuing until the 1960s before softball really began to gain traction. In 1952, the Tasmanian state softball federation aligned itself with the Australian Women's Softball Council. In 1952, a Victorian side toured the state. In 1975, there were 60 teams affiliated with the state organisation, 56 in 1976, 57 in 1977, 88 in 1978, 207 in 1983 and 216 in 1984.

== Participation ==
The state association is involved with Softball Australia's Play Ball programme and is working to increase junior participation in the sport in their state.

== National championships ==
The state hosted the Mack Gilley Shield in Hobart in 1958 and 1964. Between 1947 and 1994, they did not win a single Mack Gilley Shield. Tasmania is occasionally unable to fill a softball team from their own state and recruit players from other states to represent them in national competitions. This was the case in 2003, with one of the players they recruited being Sandra Holden.

== Men's softball ==
Men's softball is not very popular in Tasmania. In 1982, there were no men's open teams or junior men's teams.

== Facilities ==
The first purpose built softball facility in Tasmania was completed in 1984 in Prince of Wales Bay, Glenorchy, Tasmania.

== See also ==
- Softball Australia
- Softball in Australia
