= Softball in New South Wales =

Softball is played in New South Wales, introduced to the state in 1939. By 1984, there were 1,356 registered teams in New South Wales. Players from Australia have been on the men's and women's national team, had AIS scholarships, played at universities in the United States, and professionally in the US, Japan and Europe.

== History and governance ==
New South Wales schools were introduced to softball in 1939. Softball saw a "benefit" in the bombing of Darwin and the inclusion of Australia in World War II in terms of bringing in American military personnel who brought softball with them to this state. The state had its own association by 1946. The state federation was one of the foundation federation members of the Australian Women's Softball Council in 1949. In 1971, there were 309 teams affiliated with the state organisation, 440 in 1975, 504 in 1976, 579 in 1977, 638 in 1978, 1,222 in 1983 and 1,356 in 1984.

== State representative teams ==
=== Gilleys Shield ===
In 1947, Queensland, New South Wales and Victoria participated in the first interstate softball competition in the country. The competition was eventually called the Mack Gilley Shield. Between 1947 and 1968, New South Wales did not win a single Mack Gilley Shield. They finally won in 1969, repeating their first-place finish again in 1973, 1981 when they shared the title with Victoria, 1986, 1988, 1989, 1990, 1991, 1993, 1997, 1999, 2000, 2001, 2004, 2005, 2008, 2012, 2014, 2015, 2017 and 2018. The state hosted the Mack Gilley Shield in Sydney in 1950, 1955, 1961,1968, 1975, 1982, 1990, 1998, 2000, 2007, 2008, 2009, 2012, 2014, 2016 and 2017. Women's open team members who represented New South Wales at the 2007 Mack Gilley Shield include Michelle Cox.

=== Elinor McKenzie Shield ===
At the 2007 Australian U-19 Women's Fastpitch Championship, New South Wales beat Western Australia in the finals.

=== Junior Women's team ===
New South Wales has three Junior teams, U17's (previously U16) and U19's, and U23's. The U17's compete for the Esther Deason Shield. The U19's compete for the Elinor McKenzie Shield.

== New South Wales players ==
=== National team representatives ===
Members of the 2011 Australia women's national softball team from New South Wales include Kaia Parnaby. Members of the 2012 Australia women's national softball team from New South Wales include Michelle Cox and Kaia Parnaby.

=== Australian Institute of Sport scholarship holders ===
The Australian Institute of Sport first awarded softball scholarships in 1993, after the 1991 announcement that softball would be included on the programme for the 1996 Summer Olympics. Since then, several competitors from this state have been awarded scholarships including Belinda Ashworth, Kylie Herbert, Kelly Lindsay and Brooke Wilkins who all had scholarships in the programme's inaugural year.

=== American University players ===
Some softball players from this state have played softball for American universities, which depleted the level of high quality players available for local, state and international competitions. They include Melanie Roche who played for Oklahoma State University starting in 1989, Brook Wilkins who played for the University of Hawaii starting in 1993, Suzanne Fairhurt who played for Oklahoma City University starting in 1993, and Kaia Parnaby for the University of Hawaii starting in 2009. Ellen Roberts who played for Memphis University from 2011. Georgia Casey at Oklahoma University from 2012. Simone Freeman at Oklahoma State University from 2011. Tahli Moore at James Madison University from 2014. Michelle Cox at San Jose University from 2012.

=== Men's softball ===
In 1985, Australia had an unofficial men's test team of all starts who played against the New Zealand national team in Melbourne. Team members from New South Wales included E. Wulf, D. Cullen, and R. Richardson.

In 1991, the Australia men's national softball team played four games of an eight-game test series against the New Zealand team in Sydney.

In 2018, the Junior Australian Men's National Team won the World Championships in Prince Alfred, SK Canada.

== Aboriginal participation ==
On 23 March 2012, a youth girls aboriginal team from the state participated in an exhibition match against the Australian Capital Territory before the announcement of a national programme to increase aboriginal participation in the sport of softball.

== See also ==
- Softball Australia
- Softball in Australia
