= Aimee Murch =

Australian softball player

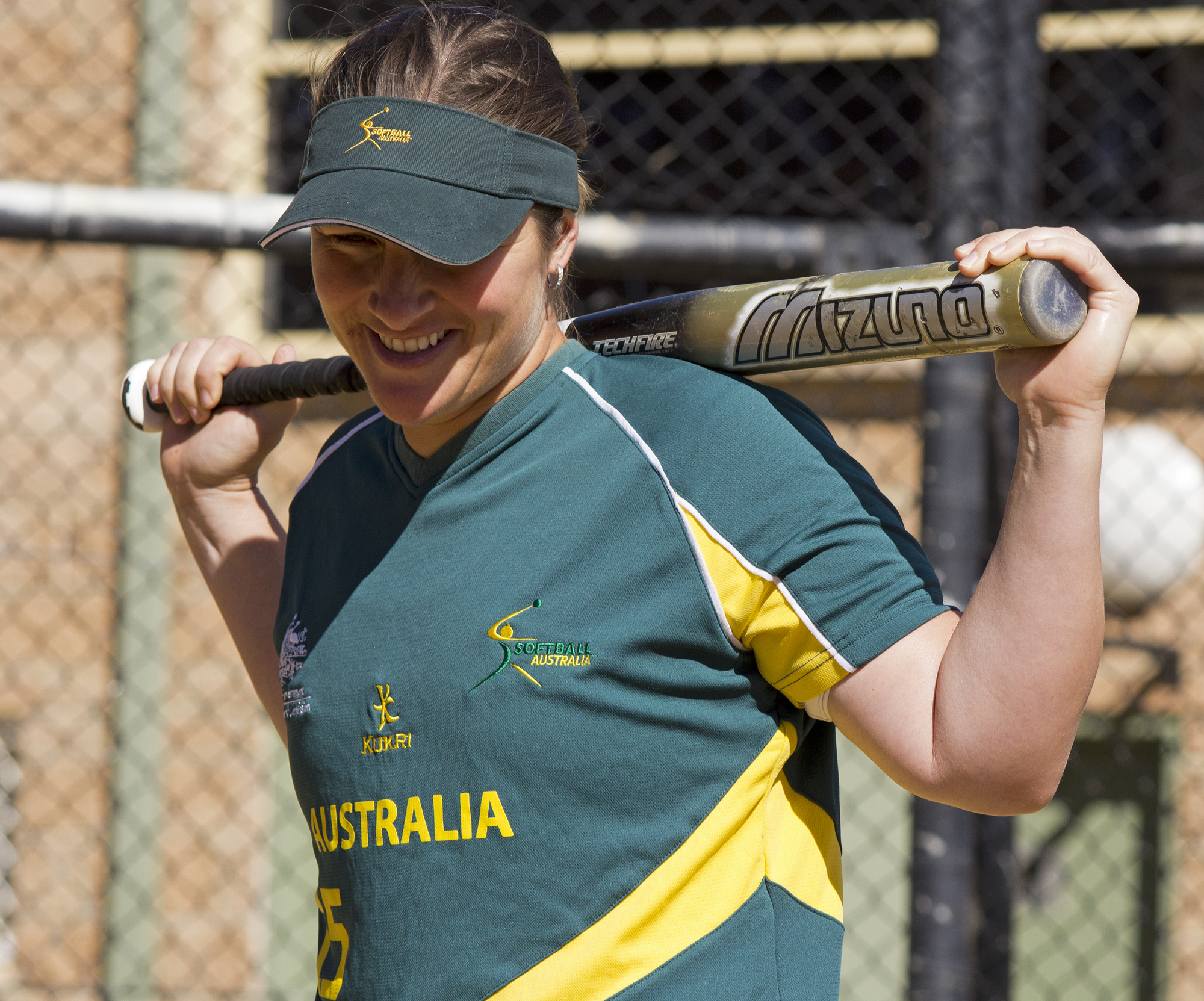
- Murch in March 2012 during a photo shoot

Personal information
- Born: June 1983 (age 43)

Sport
- Country: Australia
- Sport: Softball
- Event: Women's team
- Club: Sutherland
- Team: Nuoro
- Turned pro: 2006

Aimee Murch (born June 1983 in Sydney) is an Australian softball player. She plays for the Australian Capital Territory (ACT) in national competitions, and for a local ACT club. She plays for the Australia women's national softball team. Furthermore, she is trying to earn a spot on the roster that will allow her to compete at the 2012 ISF XIII Women's World Championships. She plays professional softball in Italy for Nuoro. She is currently employed by the Queensland Department of Education.

== Personal ==
Murch was born in June 1983 in Sydney. She is from the Australian Capital Territory.

== Softball ==
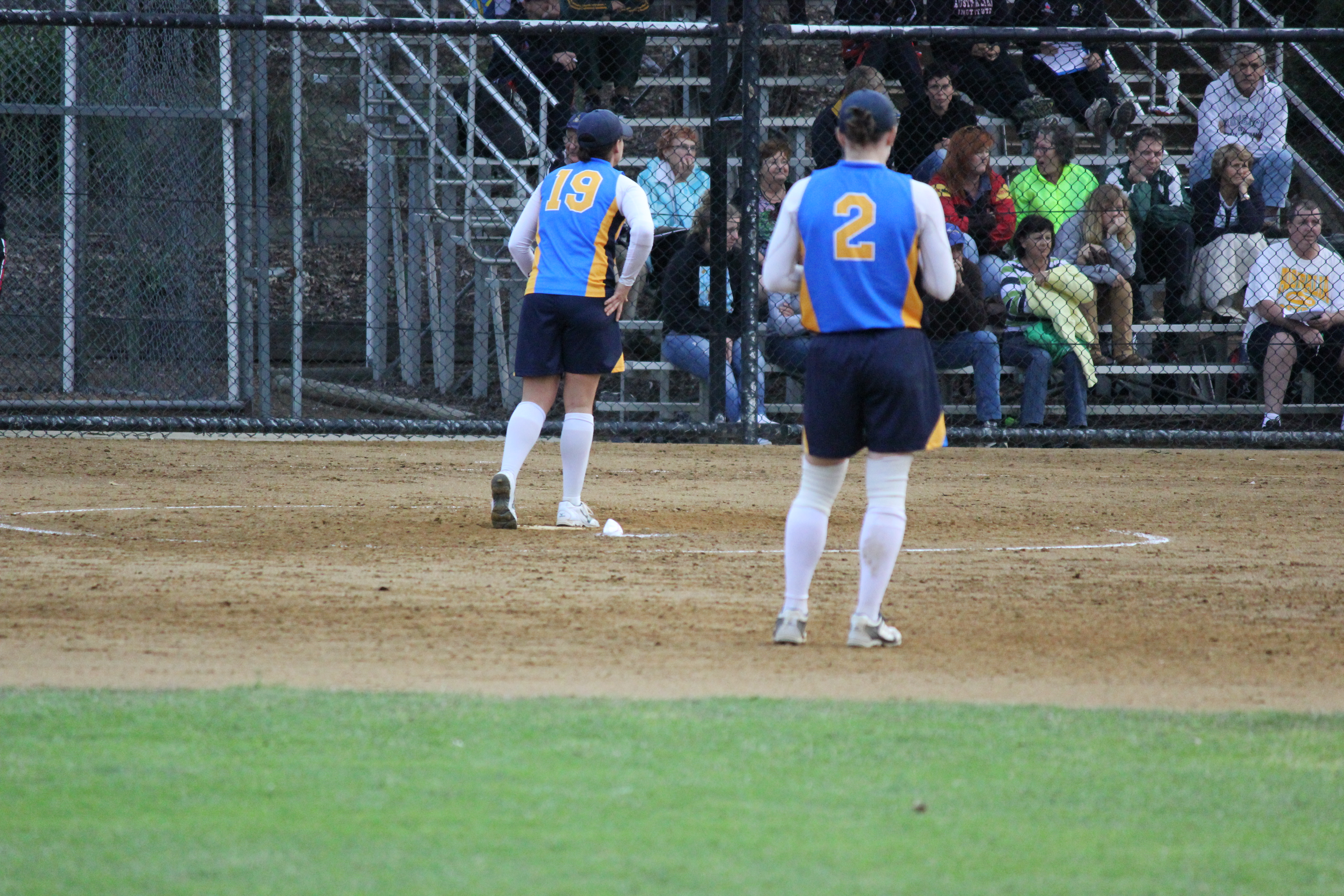
The 19 March 2012 game at Hawker International Softball Centre between the ACT representative side and the Japanese national team. No. 19 is Aimee Murch; No. 2 is Clare Warwick.

Murch is a pitcher. She played in an 8–0 loss to the United States.

Murch has played for the Australian Capital Territory team in national competition. In 2009, she competed in the Gilleys Shield and was named Best Pitcher. She was also a member of the team in 2011. She has played club softball in the territory, including for Sutherland in the ACT women's fast-pitch competition in 2011. In October that year, she helped her team defeat the Boomerangs, who featured returning international Clare Warwick.

=== University team ===
Murch played university softball in the United States for Lynn University. In 2005, she was named First Team All-American and was awarded Female Athlete of the Year by the Sunshine State Conference. She was also named Most Valuable Player at the NCAA Division II National Championship. In both 2005 and 2006, she was named athlete of the year by her university.

In 2010, Lynn University inducted her into its Hall of Fame, making her the first softball player to receive that honour.

While pitching for the university, she set several school records, including:

- 22 strikeouts in a single game
- An ERA of 0.45
- 39 wins in a season
- 38 complete games
- 21 shutouts
- 428 strikeouts in a single season

She concluded her university career with:

- A 0.55 ERA
- 62 total wins
- 69 complete games
- 37 shutouts
- 737 career strikeouts

=== National team ===
Murch has represented the Australia women's national softball team. She made her national team debut in 2009 and received a scholarship at the Australian Institute of Sport, which she retained in 2010.

In March 2011, she was selected for the national squad for international competition and was one of four players from the Australian Capital Territory chosen.

In 2011, she competed at the World Cup of Softball. She also played in an 8–0 loss to the United States.

She was named to the 2012 national squad and sought selection for the 2012 ISF XIII Women's World Championships.

The removal of softball from the Olympic programme in 2012 and 2016 reduced funding for Softball Australia, which affected international competition opportunities.

=== Professional softball ===
Murch began playing professional softball in 2006 for an Italian team, remaining with them through the 2008 season. During that period, the team won the Italian Championship, Italian Cup, and European Cup.

In 2009, she played for the Dutch club Terravogels and was named Best Pitcher in the Dutch Softball League. She also won a European Cup with the club.

She returned to Italy in 2011 and later signed with a Nuoro team during the 2011–12 off-season. She has also played for Italian clubs in Legnano and La Loggia.
