= Softball in the Northern Territory =

Softball is played in the Northern Territory, Australia.

== History and governance ==
Elsewhere in Australia, softball saw a "benefit" in the bombing of Darwin and the inclusion of Australia in World War II in terms of bringing in American military personnel who brought softball with them. This was not the case in the Northern Territory. Softball was played across the territory but formal organised competitions between towns was difficult because of distances, mobile populations that changed teams regularly as a result and the relatively small population of women in the territory that were available to play softball. Media coverage of the sport by the local media was taking place by 1955, with references in the Northern Territory News and other publications.

The first local organisation and league for softball was created in 1955 in Darwin, but softball players had to struggle to find playing fields and were forced to borrow equipment from their baseball playing male counterparts. The first league had four teams. One from the Department of Civil Aviation, the army and two of the other services. One of the early drivers of Northern Territory softball was Shirley Meakins, who learned the game in Perth. The league's first game was played at the Darwin Oval on 23 July 1955. This league had some problems and was disbanded by the end of the year. Another league was established, successfully, the following year, 1956. This league was created with the assistance of the NT Baseball League. They supported games with an idea of having their games having a softball game preceding it to help bring in more fans. This league was supported by Gwen Toogood and Vera Fontin. Toogood had picked up the game while living in South Australia. The local media coverage in the next few years referred to her as one of the best women players of the game in the area. This 1956 created league was officially announced on 8 February 1956 and was called the Dawin Women's Softball Association. Its creation included references in The Northern Territory News. The league's first president was Eve Evert, secretary was Toogood and the treasurer was Fontin.

During the 1950s and 1960s, the Northern Territory did not have a territory organisation despite the sport being played in the territory. Because of this, the national association allowed teams and players from Alice Springs and Tennant Creek to align themselves with the South Australian association. In 1960, the national association investigated whether or not a territory based association could be accepted into the national organisation based on the constitution. They sent the question to the organisation's lawyers to attempt to resolve the query.

A territory softball association aligned with the national organisation was created in 1978.

== Participation ==
In 1975, there were 41+ teams affiliated with the national organisation, 61+ in 1976, 126 in 1977, 81 in 1978, 73 in 1983 and 62 in 1984. The state association is involved with Softball Australia's Play Ball programme and is working to increase junior participation in the sport in their state. In order to grow indigenous Australian participation in the Northern Territory, high-profile softball players including Kate Quigley, Danni Hanna and Ilsa Wakeling have worked as ambassadors in remote and rural Northern Territory communities.

== National championships ==
Between 1947 and 1968, the Northern Territory did not win nor host the Mack Gilley Shield. They did not win between 1969 and 1994.

== Players ==
=== American university players ===
Some softball players from this state have played softball for American universities, which depleted the level of high quality players available for local, state and international competitions. They include Kerry Dienelt who played for the University of California starting in 1988.

== Men's softball ==
In 1982, there were 3 men's open teams in the Northern Territory based in Alica Springs.

== See also ==
- Softball Australia
- Softball in Australia
