= Melinda Weaver =

Australian softball player

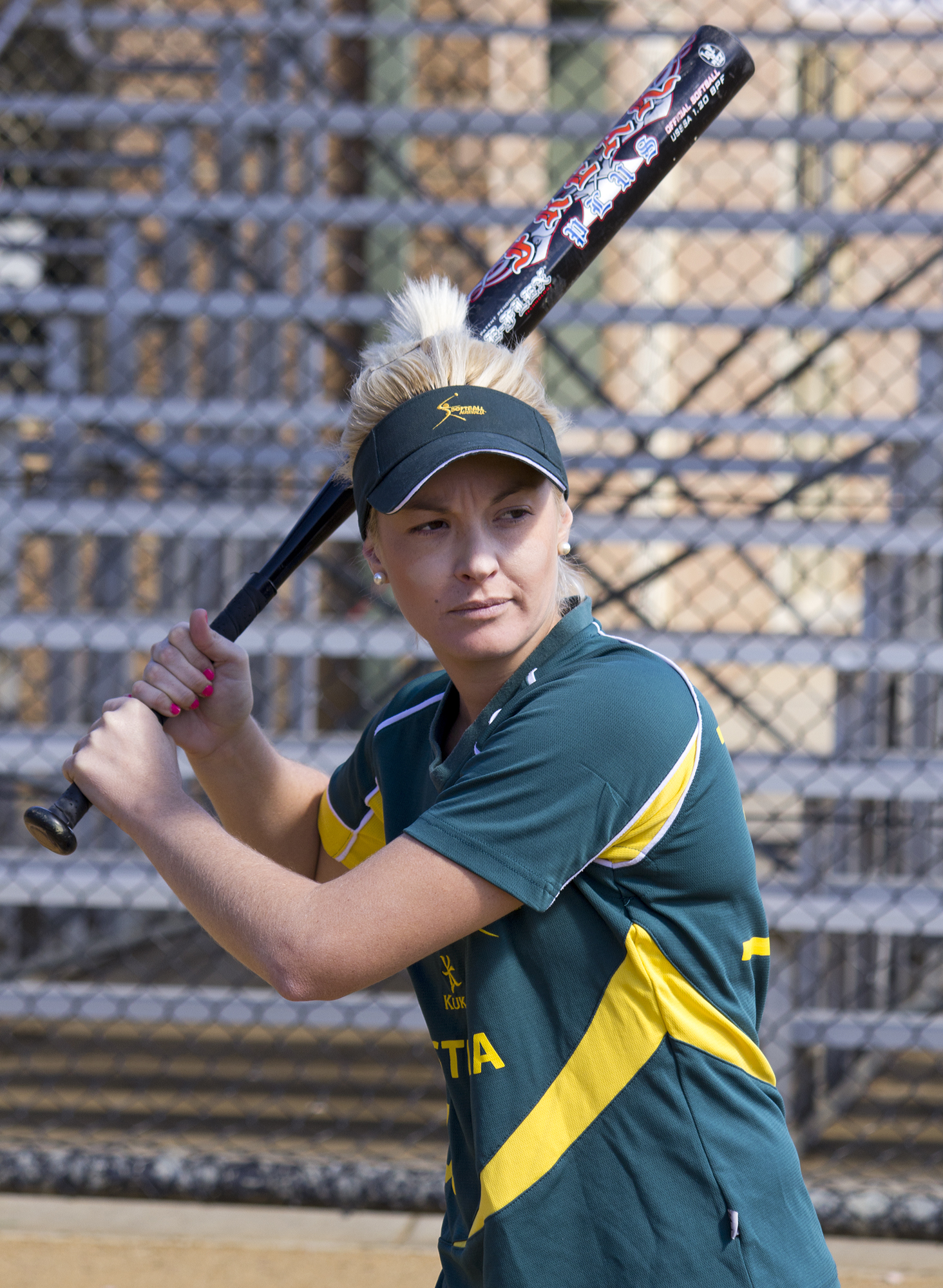
- Weaver in March 2012 during a photoshoot

Personal information
- Nationality: Australian
- Born: February 1987 (age 39) Brisbane, Queensland

Sport
- Country: Australia
- Sport: Softball
- Event: Women's team
- Club: Brisbane Reds
- Team: Nuoro
- Turned pro: 2009

Melinda Weaver (born February 1987) is an Australian softball player from Brisbane, Queensland. She plays shortstop and held softball scholarships with the Queensland Academy of Sport and the Australian Institute of Sport. At national competitions, she represents Queensland. She missed out at competing at the 2008 Summer Olympics as a result of injury. She is vying for a spot on the team to compete at the World Championships in 2012.

== Personal ==
Weaver was born in February 1987 in Brisbane. She has lived in Caboolture, Queensland, and attended Grace College. Her hobbies include surfing, camping and jetskiing.

== Softball ==
Weaver is a shortstop. She has held a softball scholarship from and played for the Queensland Academy of Sport. In 2007, she played for a Queensland Academy of Sport side against China. In the game, she had two hits and a walk in a 3–1 loss. In 2009, she was unable to play for the Australian Institute of Sport team because she got a contract to play professionally in Italy.

Weaver has also held a softball scholarship from and played for the Australian Institute of Sport, which happened in 2008.

Weaver has played softball for several clubs, including the Caboolture Softball Association and Brisbane Redsox. In 2001, she played for the Brisbane U16 squad when they competed in state titles that year. At the competition, she dislocated her thumb. In 2008, she competed in the Queensland Open Women's State Championships where she again played for the Brisbane side.

Weaver missing out on the 2008 Games, she took a four-month break from the sport.

=== State team ===
Weaver has represented Queensland on the junior and senior level at national competitions. In 2002, she represented Queensland at the U15 national championships. She was a member of the senior Queensland team in 2008. She was a member of the 2009 team that won the Gilleys Shield. She competed again in the Gilley Cup in 2011, where it was important for her to play well because it was being used for selection for the national team to compete at the 2012 World Championships.

=== National team ===
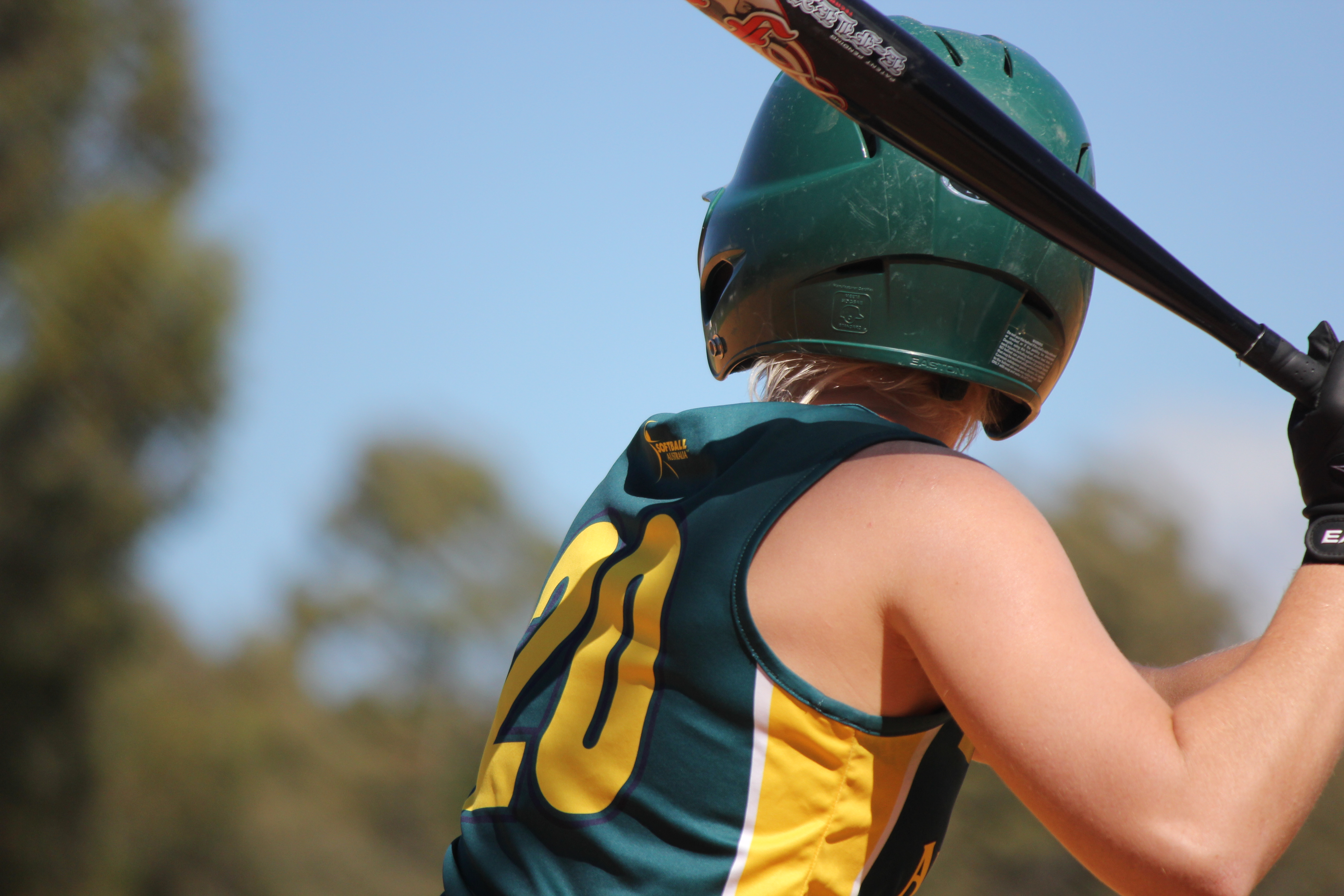
Weaver batting against Japan

Weaver was a member of the national team in 2007 and participated in a six-game test series against China in the Redlands. This was her first international competition with the team. She was on the short list of national team members to compete at the 2008 Summer Olympics but did not make the final squad to go to Beijing. Her lack of selection was a result of missing several national team training camps because of a broken wrist. She attended the Games as a spectator. She is a member of the 2012 Australia women's national softball team and is trying to solidify a spot on the squad so she can compete at the 2012 ISF XIII Women's World Championships .

=== Professional softball ===
Weaver first played professional softball in 2009 for an Italian side. She signed with an Italian Nuoro side during the 2011/2012 offseason.

== Recognition ==
In 2008, Weaver was the Caboolture Sportsperson of the Year.
