= Midge Nelson =

Australian softball player

Marjorie E. Nelson BEM
Personal information
- Nickname: Midge Nelson
- Born: Marjorie Eileen Nelson; 2 February 1937 (age 89) Cottesloe, Western Australia

Sport
- Country: Australia
- Sport: Softball
- Position: Catcher
- Coached by: Myrtle Edwards

Marjorie Eileen "Midge" Nelson BEM (born 1937) is a former softball player from Australia. She is considered one of the greatest softball players from Australia, competing in the Women's Softball World Cup four times. She was the first Australian softball player to be inducted into the International Softball Federation Hall of Fame. She also played field hockey for Australia. The Midge Nelson Medal is awarded to the most valuable player at the Australian Softball Federation's national championships.

== Early life and sport ==
Marjorie Eileen Nelson was born on 2 February 1937 in Cottesloe, Western Australia, one of four children. She played softball with the Freemantle Rebels from the age of 16 and in 1956 made the Western Australia state team. She also played hockey in the winter and five-a-side basketball in 1958. She went to nationals with the Western Australian softball team four times, captaining the team to victory in 1959.

Nelson travelled to Victoria in 1959. She was selected for the Victorian state teams for basketball, hockey, and softball. During her time with the Victorian softball team, her team went to nationals 19 times and won the title 12 times.

== International career ==
Nelson started her international career in 1960, and is considered one of the greatest Australian softball players, competing with the Australia women's national softball team in the Women's Softball World Cup four times. At the 1965 world cup in Melbourne, the Australian team won and Nelson scored two home runs in the lead-up game to the final. The Australian softball team toured South Africa for six weeks in 1967. Apartheid was an eye-opener for Nelson, who said "we found it hard to adapt to the downgrading of the South African black population." Nelson's nose was broken in Hong Kong during hockey training later that year. Her team went to Leverkusen, Germany for the world hockey tournament, with her as vice-captain.

Nelson competed in the Women's Softball World Cup in 1970 in Osaka, 1974 in Connecticut and 1978 in San Salvador. She captained the Australian softball team from 1973 until her retirement in 1978. Following her retirement, she coached the Victoria team. During her career she played in a total of 54 matches as a member of the Australian team, captaining the team in 25 matches. Her career fielding average was .994 and her career batting average was .205.

== Awards and accolades ==
Nelson received a British Empire Medal at the 1977 Australia Day Honours for "service to softball and hockey". She was the first Australian softball player to be inducted into the International Softball Federation Hall of Fame in 1983 and was inducted into the Australian Softball Hall of Fame in 1985. The most valuable player at the Australian Softball Federation's national championships is awarded the Midge Nelson Medal. A wool softball cap she wore is part of the collection of the Australian Sports Museum.

== See also ==
- Softball in Victoria
- Victorian Softball Association
