= Softball in South Australia =

Softball is played in South Australia.

== History and governance ==
From the pages of "Diamond Duels (Women's Softball in South Australia) the first 60 Years" we find a reminder of the beginning:

"In September 1944, Miss Helen Black, fueled by her passion for softball and her experiences with the game in New Zealand, embarked on a mission to establish the South Australian Women's Softball Association. Her vision was clear: to train leaders, form an association, and organize a competition. And on September 25th, 1944, that vision became a reality as the association was officially created, with Miss Black as its inaugural chairperson."

Diamond Duels (Women's Softball in South Australia) the first 60 Years, is a book published (in 2006) by Kathleen Correll and Lorraine Mildren have recorded much of the history.

Softball saw a "benefit" in the bombing of Darwin and the inclusion of Australia in World War II in terms of bringing in American military personnel who brought softball with them to this state. The state federation was one of the foundation federation members of the Australian Women's Softball Council in 1949. During the 1950s and 1960s, the Northern Territory did not have a territory organisation despite the sport being played in the territory. Because of this, the national association allowed teams and players from Alice Springs and Tennant Creek to align themselves with the South Australian association.

In 1971, there were 203 South Australian based teams affiliated with the state organisation, 312 in 1975, 353 in 1976, 209 in 1977, 397 in 1978, 532 in 1983 and 580 in 1984. The state association is involved with Softball Australia's Play Ball programme and is working to increase junior participation in the sport in their state.

In 2023/24 Softball SA celebrated its 80th Season.

== National championships ==
South Australia won the Mack Gilley Shield (Gilley's Shield) in 1956. Between 1957 and 2020, they did not win another championship. As a result of COVID-19, the 2021 Championship was not played. After a 66-year drought, the South Australian team (the SA Starz) won in 2022 and then again in 2025.

The state has hosted the Gilley's Shield in Adelaide in 1951, 1956, 1962, 1969, 1976, 1983, 1991, 1999, 2005, 2022, and 2023.

== Facilities ==
While West Beach (Adelaide) is the home to Australia's third international competition ready softball diamond, complete with lights (built in 1984), Softball SA had many homes and their journey has seen them relocate from the Victoria Park Racecourse to the Vacuum Oil Co grounds, on to the Women's Memorial Playing Fields, and finally since 1959, go to Barratt Reserve, West Beach. Softball is the longest tenant to be located on the Barratt Reserves.

== Players ==
=== American university players ===
Some softball players from this state have played softball for American universities, which depleted the level of high quality players available for local, state and international competitions. They include Tracey Mosley who played for Oklahoma City University starting in 1991 and Natalie Kulas who played for Oklahoma City University starting in 1993. Melissa McGie played at the University of Hawai'i 1997-2000.

Softball Australia has tried to address this issue with the changing of dates for National Championships to help these athletes.

While it was not as common in the 1990's, several South Australian's have since gone on to different US Colleges, including

Stephanie Trzcinski at the university of California Berkeley

Annali Dolman, Georgia Hood, Hayley Bonython, Jamie Mead, Steph Collett, Madison Scott... (list requires updating)

=== National team members ===
Diamond Duels once again provided the following list of South Australian players to play for the Australian Women's National Team

Australian Players

In order of first selection – up to January 2003

- 1951 — Leach, May
- 1952 — Hamilton, Sheila
- 1953 — Phillips, Barbara
- 1954 — Adey, Rosemary
- 1954 — Scarman, Val
- 1955 — Hosking, Dot
- 1962 — Amor, Gillian
- 1962 — Whittingham, Nancy (World Champion 1966)
- 1972 — Edwards (m. Brown) Lorraine
- 1973 — Burston, Mary
- 1973 — Cheesman, Jenny
- 1973 — Harvey, Pat
- 1974 — Stevens, Janne
- 1976 — Frank, Vicki
- 1978 — Gillespie, Kaylene
- 1980 — Forner, Lauren
- 1982 — Thompson née Gray, Jenny
- 1982 — Russell née Bruce, Kelly
- 1982 — Tomlinson, Sue
- 1983 — Fairlie, Jane
- 1983 — Pike, Louise
- 1984 — Martin, Linda
- 1990 — Bennet, Melanie
- 1992 — Mosley, Tracey
- 1997 — Follas, Selina
- 1997 — Morrow, Simmone
- 2002 — McGie, Melissa

*A record of Australian Women's representatives between 2004 and 2010 needs to be sourced

South Australians that have debuted for the Australian Women's team (the Aussie Spirit) since 2011 include:

Representative Number	Debut	Name
264	2011	Belinda White
265	2012	Vanessa Stokes
282	2017	Jordan Lambert (Harris)
286	2018	Madeline Cameron
290	2020	Stephanie Trzcinski
291	2022	Georgia Hood
298	2023	Pippa Adkins
300	2023	Hayley Bonython
306	2024	Madison Scott
308	2024	Olivia Elliott
310	2025	Neve Adams
315	2026	Taylor Chillingworth
318	2026	Chelsea Robinson
319	2026	Abbie Bastian
320	2026	Amber Hood

== Men's softball ==
In 1944, the state baseball association created a men's softball competition but this league quickly folded. A second serious attempt was made to create a South Australian men's team in 1974 with support from the women's softball association. The team largely drew players from the American community who worked at the Woomera Rocket Range. They would play exhibition matches against the South Australian women's team in preparation for the national championships. In 1982, there were 11 men's open teams in South Australia. In 1985, Australia had an unofficial test team of all starts who played against the New Zealand national team in Melbourne. Team members from South Australia included Alan Oldfather Jr, and Alan Oldfather Sr.

Jarryd Farrell is the only South Australian Men's player to play for the Australian Men's team at a World Championship. He won a silver medal at the 15th WBSC Men's World Cup, played in Whitehorse, Yukon, Canada in 2017. He also recorded a 'no-hitter' against Men's softball powerhouse NZ Blacksox in the final of the Oceania Qualifier in American Samoa (11/11/2023).

== See also ==
- Softball Australia
- Softball in Australia
