= Softball in Victoria =

Softball is played in the Australian state of Victoria.

== History and governance ==
Softball in Victoria grew after the bombing of Darwin and the inclusion of Australia in World War II, when American military personnel brought the game with them. The state had its own association by 1946. The organisation came about because of the work of two people, American Special Forces Sergeant William Du Vernet and Melburnian Irene Burrows. The state federation was one of the foundation federation members of the Australian Women's Softball Council in 1949. By 1949, the Victorian association had 22 clubs and 250 players competing in its competitions. In 1971, there were 375 teams affiliated with the state organisation, 559 in 1975, 605 in 1976, 760 in 1977, 920 in 1978, 940 in 1983 and 900 in 1984. The state association is involved with Softball Australia's Play Ball programme and is working to increase junior participation in the sport in their state.

== National championships ==
=== Gilleys Shield ===
In 1947, Queensland, New South Wales and Victoria participated in the first interstate softball competition in the country. The competition was eventually called the Mack Gilley Shield. Victoria won the Mack Gilley Shield in 1947, 1949, 1950, and 1951. They won it again in 1954, 1957 and 1958. They did not win in 1959 but won again in 1960, 1961 and 1962. Queensland won in 1963, but Victoria won again in 1964 and 1965 and 1967. Victoria went on to win again in 1970, 1971, 1972, 1974, 1976, 1977, and shared the title with New South Wales in 1981. They won again in 1982, and 1985. The state hosted the Mack Gilley Shield in Melbourne in 1949, 1954, 1960 and 1967.

== Players ==
=== National team representatives ===
Majorie Nelson was a Victorian softball player. She was the first softball player to represent any country at four World Series of Softball. She was the Australian captain in 1974 and 1978 and the World Series. Justine Smethurst also represented Australia.

=== Australian Institute of Sport scholarship holders ===
The Australian Institute of Sport first awarded softball scholarships in 1993, after the 1991 announcement that softball would be included on the programme for the 1996 Summer Olympics. Since then, several competitors from this state have been awarded scholarships including Dianne Clark, Peta Edebone, Jenny Holliday, Kellie Loughman, Belinda Lowing and Nicole Richardson who all had scholarships in the programme's inaugural year.

=== American university players ===
Some softball players from this state have played softball for American universities, which depleted the level of high quality players available for local, state and international competitions. They include Ruth Chatwin who played for the University of Nebraska–Lincoln starting in 1987, Ann Sanders who played for the University of Las Vegas starting in 1987.

== Facilities and hosting ==
Melbourne hosted the first ISF Women's World Championship in 1965. Melbourne was the home to Australia's second international competition ready softball diamond, complete with lights. It was built in 1983.

== Men's softball ==
Victoria was one of the state leaders when it came to men's softball. At the 1979 annual meeting for the national softball association, the Victorian delegation moved the organisation should create a long-term plan to improve the men's game. In 1982, the state organisation's newsletter wrote about the distances some of the men in the state were travelling in order to compete, including one player, Mark Buls, who travelled from Swan Hill, Victoria to Knox, Victoria in order to play in Saturday games. In 1985, Australia had an unofficial test team of all-stars who played against the New Zealand national team in Melbourne. Team members from Victoria included S. Adams and N. Tsoukalas.

== See also ==
- Softball Australia
- Softball in Australia
