= Sandra Holden =

Australian softball player

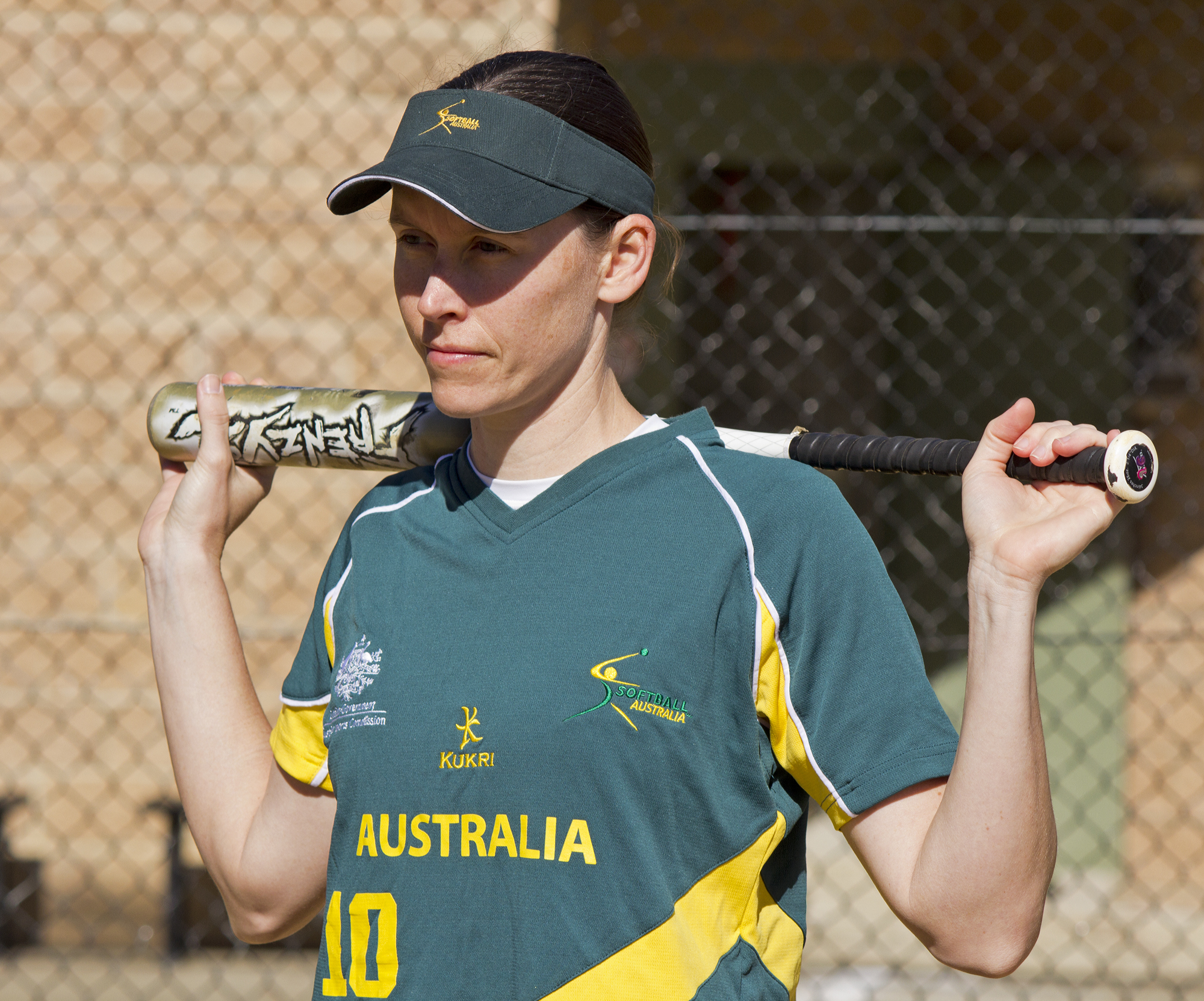
- Holden in March 2012 during a photoshoot

Personal information
- Birth name: Sandra Avery
- Nationality: Australian

Sport
- Country: Australia
- Sport: Softball
- Event: Women's team
- Club: Peninsula Cougars

Achievements and titles
- National finals: 2007, 2010, 2011, 2012

Sandra Holden (née Avery) is an Australian softball pitcher. She teaches high school science at Mueller College and resides in Ormeau, Queensland. She represents Queensland in national competitions and she is a member of the Australia women's national softball team, where she represented the country in a 2009 tour of Japan and in a January 2012 test against New Zealand. She is trying to earn a spot on the team that will allow her to compete at the 2012 ISF XIII Women's World Championships

== Personal ==
Holden is from Queensland. She is a high school science teacher at Livingstone Christian College, and is married. Her maiden name was Avery. She resides in Ormeau, Queensland.

== Softball ==
Holden is a pitcher. She started playing softball as a ten-year-old in school. This led her to joining a club outside of school. She has played softball for around 20 years and prays before she plays in games. She plays club softball for Peninsula Cougars.

=== State team ===
Holden usually represents Queensland in national competitions. However, in 2003, she represented Tasmania at the national championships, earning the spot because the Tasmanians were looking to fill in their squad as they were short on players.

Holden first represented Queensland on the junior U23 level in 2000 and played with them for four years. She was first named to the Queensland state senior team, Queensland Sunlanders, in 2004, and first represented them at the 2005 national championships. She earned her spot after the withdraw of two players and retirement of one player ranked above her. She represented her state in the Gilleys Shield in 2007, 2011 and 2012. In 2011, she picked up a bronze medal in the Shield. The Logan West Leader described her performance in 2012 as being in "top form". At the end of the fourth round of competition in 2012, her team was in fourth place. Two other years that she played for the team, they finished first in the Shield. She also represented her state in the 2012 Edebone-Weber Shield, similar to the Gilleys Shield except it includes New Zealand as a competing side.

=== National team ===
Holden is a member of Australia women's national softball team. She rotates spots with teammate Jocelyn McCallum as one of the team's pitchers. She was a member of the 2009 national team that toured Japan for two weeks. She is a member of the 2012 Australia women's national softball team and is trying to earn a spot on the team that will allow her to compete at the 2012 ISF XIII Women's World Championships. In January 2012, she traveled with the team to play in a test series against New Zealand women's national softball team. She was chosen to represent the country in a March 2012 series against Japan that was played in Canberra.
