= Michelle Cox =

Australian softball outfielder (born 1991)

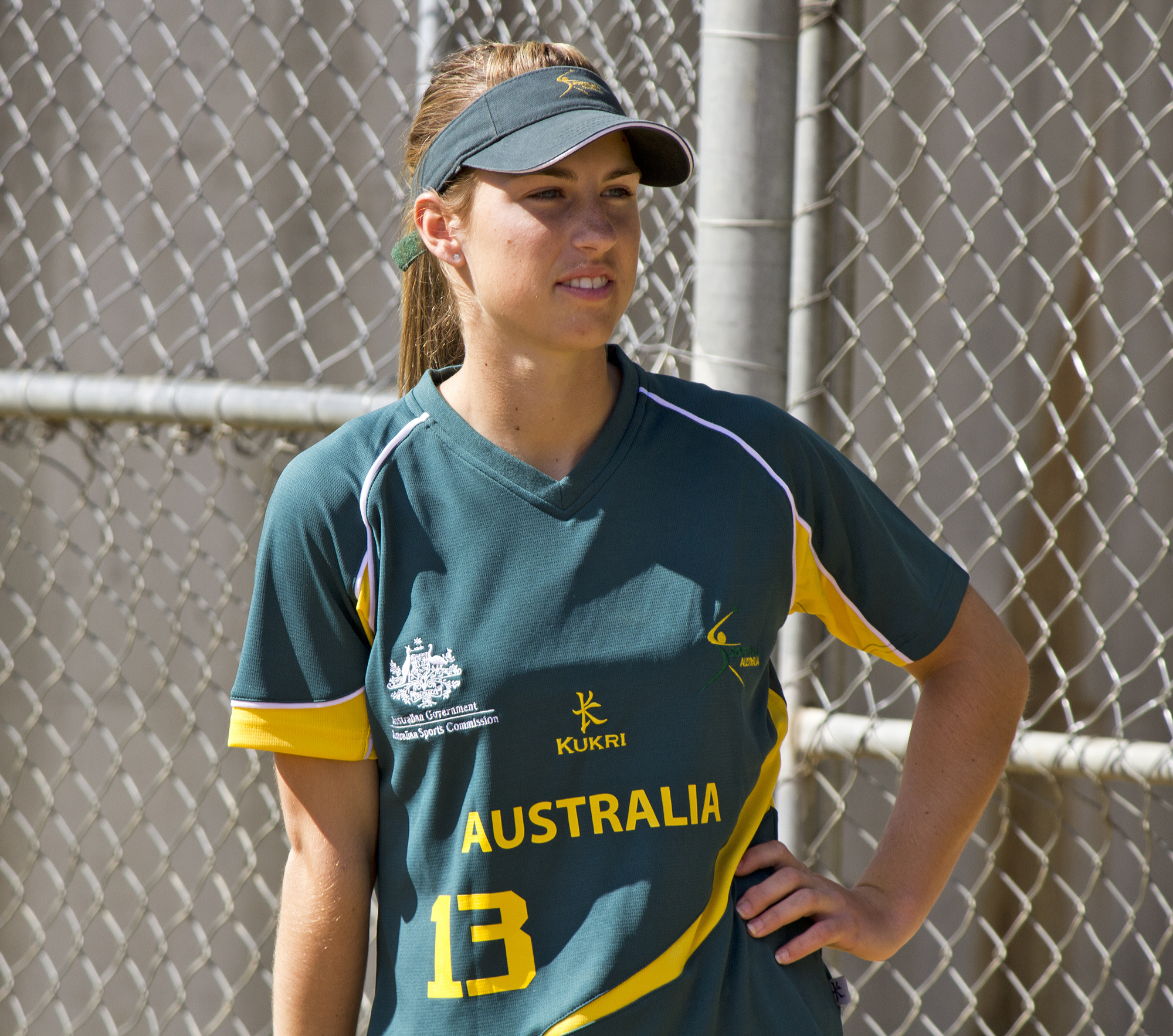
- Cox in March 2012 during a photoshoot

Personal information
- Born: 15 April 1991 (age 35) Sydney, New South Wales, Australia
- Height: 5 ft 6 in (1.68 m)

Sport
- Country: Australia
- Sport: Softball
- Position: Right fielder
- Event: Women's team
- College team: San Jose State Spartans

Michelle Johanna Cox (born 15 April 1991) is an Australian softball outfielder. She has represented New South Wales as a member of the U16 team in national competitions and has played on the Australia women's national softball team. From 2012 to 2015, Cox played for San Jose State University.

== Personal ==
Born in Sydney and raised in Belrose, New South Wales, Cox graduated from Roseville College in 2009. Her brother, Tim Cox, played baseball professionally for the Boston Red Sox's farm system. She started playing baseball when she was seven years old because her brother was involved with the sport. She played several sports while in secondary school, including touch football, netball and athletics.

== Softball ==
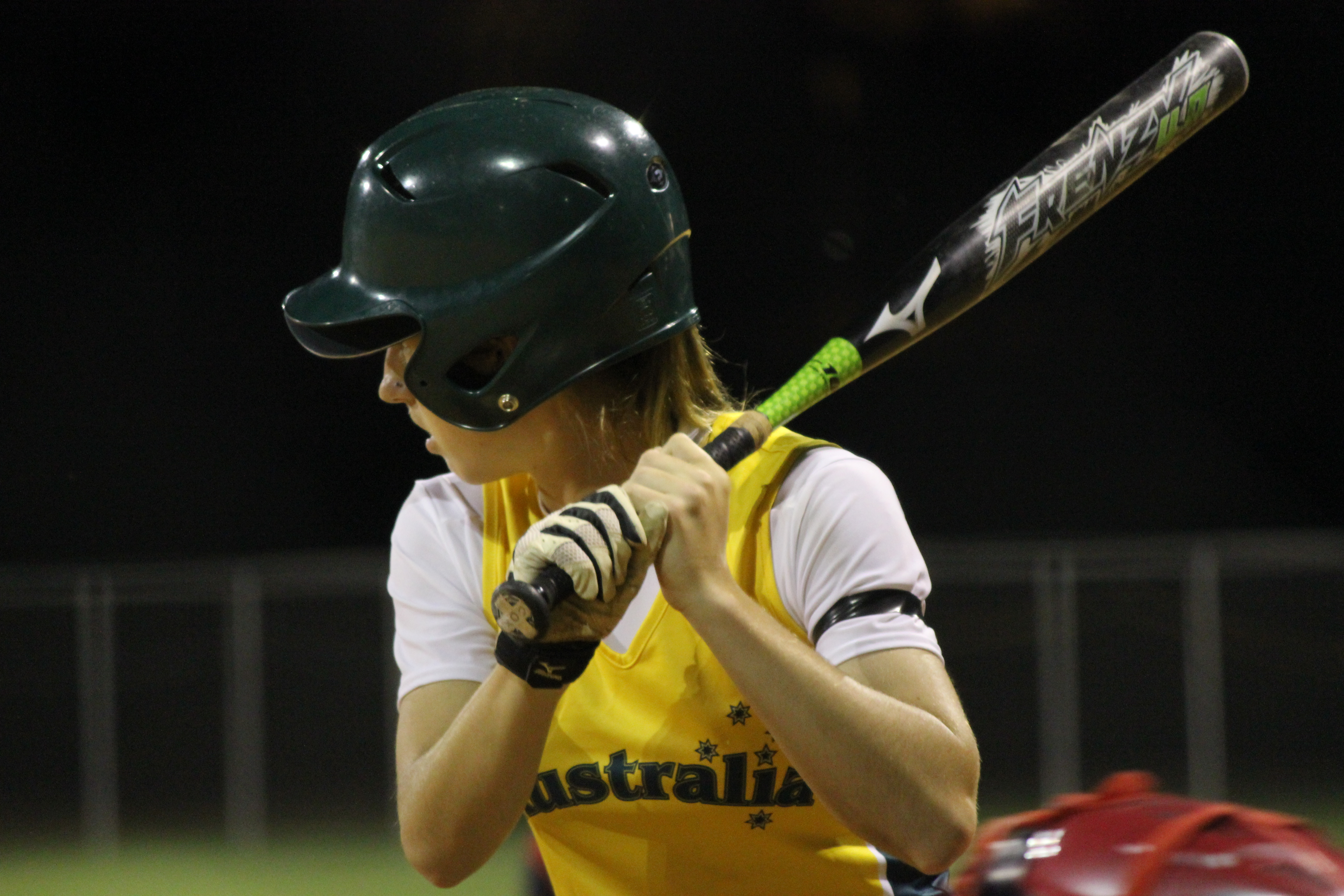
Cox at bat against Japan on 21 March 2012

Cox is a right field outfielder, who first started playing softball in 2003. In 2009, she played for an Australian Institute of Sport team. She started playing elite level softball in 2003 with a club in Manly Warringah where she was coached by Angela Knight. Playing for her secondary school side, her team came in first at the Independent Girls' School Sport Association Championships.

2006 was the first time Cox was called up to represent New South Wales on their U16 side. She got the call up in October and played with the team. She represented the state at the national championships in 2007. In 2009, she was playing club softball in the Manly-Warringah Softball Association.

=== University ===
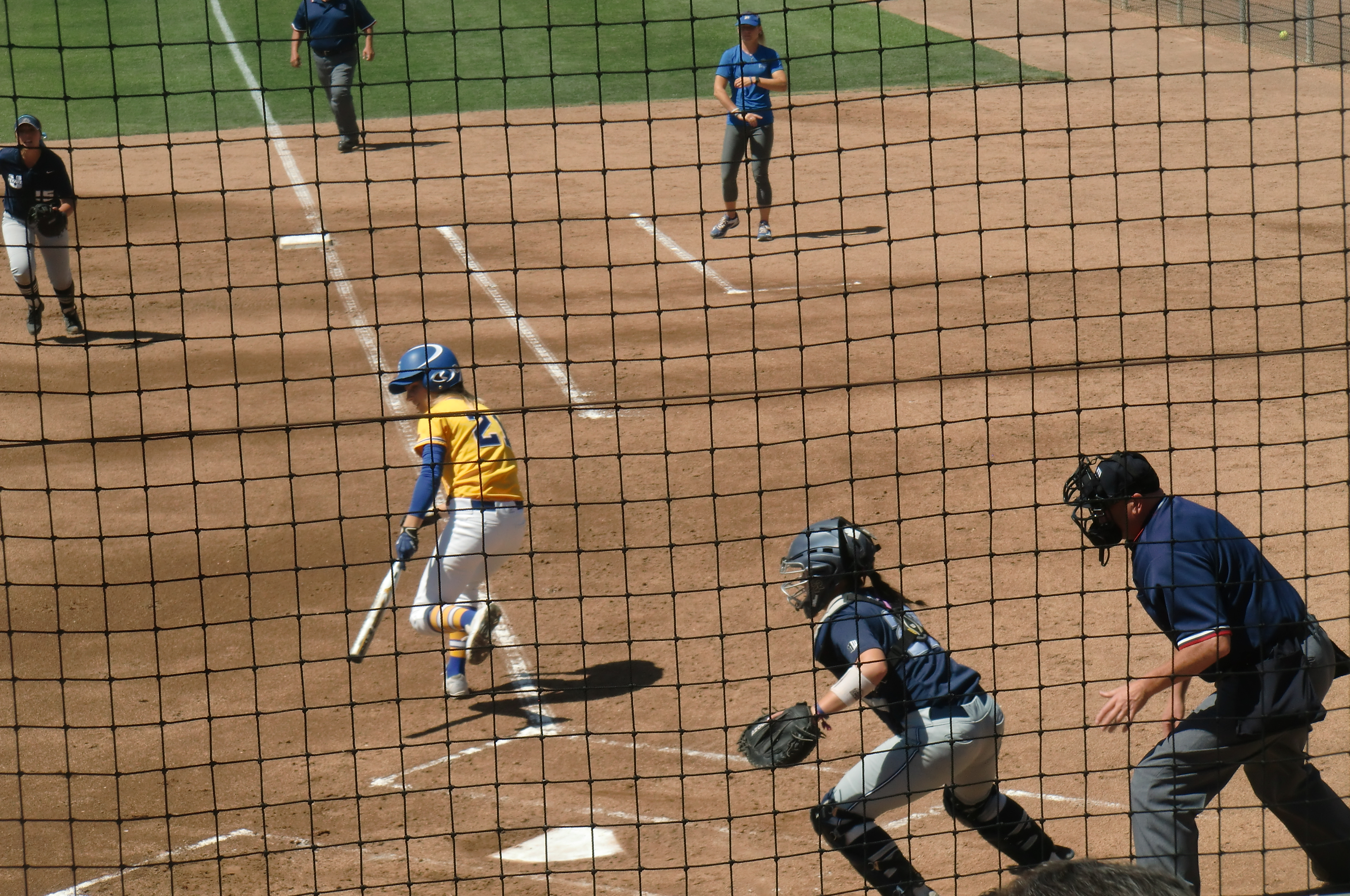
Cox at bat for San Jose State in 2015.

Cox signed with San Jose State University in San Jose, California in the US on 27 April 2011, then played for the San Jose State Spartans from 2012 to 2015; she majored in business administration with a concentration on accounting.

Cox led San Jose State in hitting in her first season in 2012, with a .366 batting average, 60 hits, and 3 triples. She also had 26 stolen bases. In February 2012 against Sacramento State, she hit a triple and notched her 11th run of the season. In March 2012, in a game against Santa Clara, Cox went two for three at the plate. She scored three runs in the game. At the end of the game, her batting average was close to .400. That month, she was one of several women nominated for Western Athletic Conference (WAC) Hitter of the Week. Cox received second-team All-WAC honors.

As a sophomore in 2013, Cox again had the top batting average (.363) for San Jose State, in addition to a team-leading 66 hits and 20 stolen bases. Cox scored 39 runs with 22 RBI. Cox earned first-team All-WAC and Academic All-WAC honors. San Jose State won both the WAC regular season and tournament and made the 2013 NCAA Tournament by virtue of winning the WAC tournament.

In 2014, her junior season and San Jose State's first season in the Mountain West Conference (MWC), Cox had a batting average of .342, the second most on the team. In MWC play, Cox led San Jose State in runs scored with 17. Cox was a CoSIDA Academic All-American District VIII selection.

Cox hit a career-high .419 in her senior season 2015. She scored 58 runs with 13 RBI.

=== National team ===
As en eighteen-year-old, Cox made her national team debut in April 2009 at the International Southern Challenge in New Zealand, after getting her first call up in March. At the April competition against New Zealand, she had three hits, one of which was a home run. In June 2009, she was with the team when they competed in the Japan Cup. Prior to that, in March 2009, she participated in a Brisbane-based training camp with the national team. 2009 was also the first year she earned a softball scholarship with the Australian Institute of Sport. She is a member of the 2012 Australia women's national softball team. She is trying to make the squad that will compete at the 2012 ISF XIII Women's World Championships .

In 2018, Cox joined National Pro Fastpitch expansion team Aussie Spirit.

Cox was selected for the Australian women's national softball team at the 2020 Summer Olympics. The team came away with one win out of five, beating Italy 1–0 in their second match of the Round Robin and finished fifth overall. Full details are in Australia at the 2020 Summer Olympics.
