= Clare Warwick =

Australian softball player

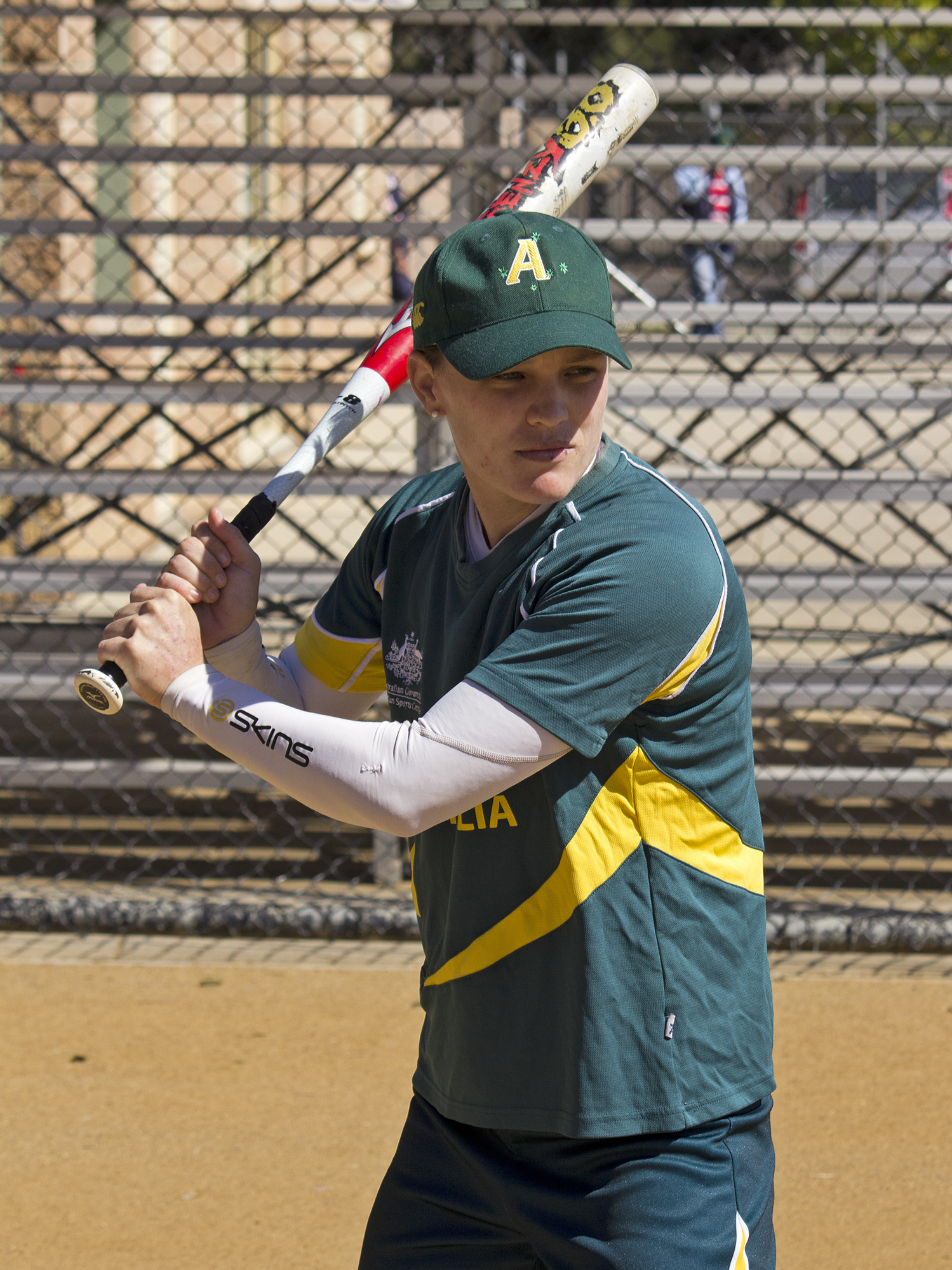
- Warwick in March 2012 during a photoshoot

Personal information
- Born: 18 May 1987 (age 39)

Sport
- Country: Australia
- Sport: Softball
- Event: Women's team
- College team: University of Hawaii
- Club: Boomerangs Softball Club, ACT
- Team: Baseball Softball Club Legnano
- Turned pro: 2010
Medal record
Softball
Representing Australia
Canada Cup
Bronze medal – third place	2011 Canada Cup	Women's team

Clare Warwick is an Australian softball player from Canberra. She is a utility player, playing several positions. She played softball at the University of Hawaii where she earned several honours. She competes for the Australian Capital Territory in national competitions in Australia. She has represented Australia on the junior and senior level. She earned a bronze medal at the 2011 Canada Cup, the 2012 World Championships (Whitehorse) and at the 2014 World Championships (Harlem). She played professional softball in Italy for Baseball Softball Club Legnano from 2010 to 2015.

== Personal ==
Warwick is from the Australian Capital Territory and is currently a high school teacher there at Harrison School who teaches Science and Italian

== Softball ==
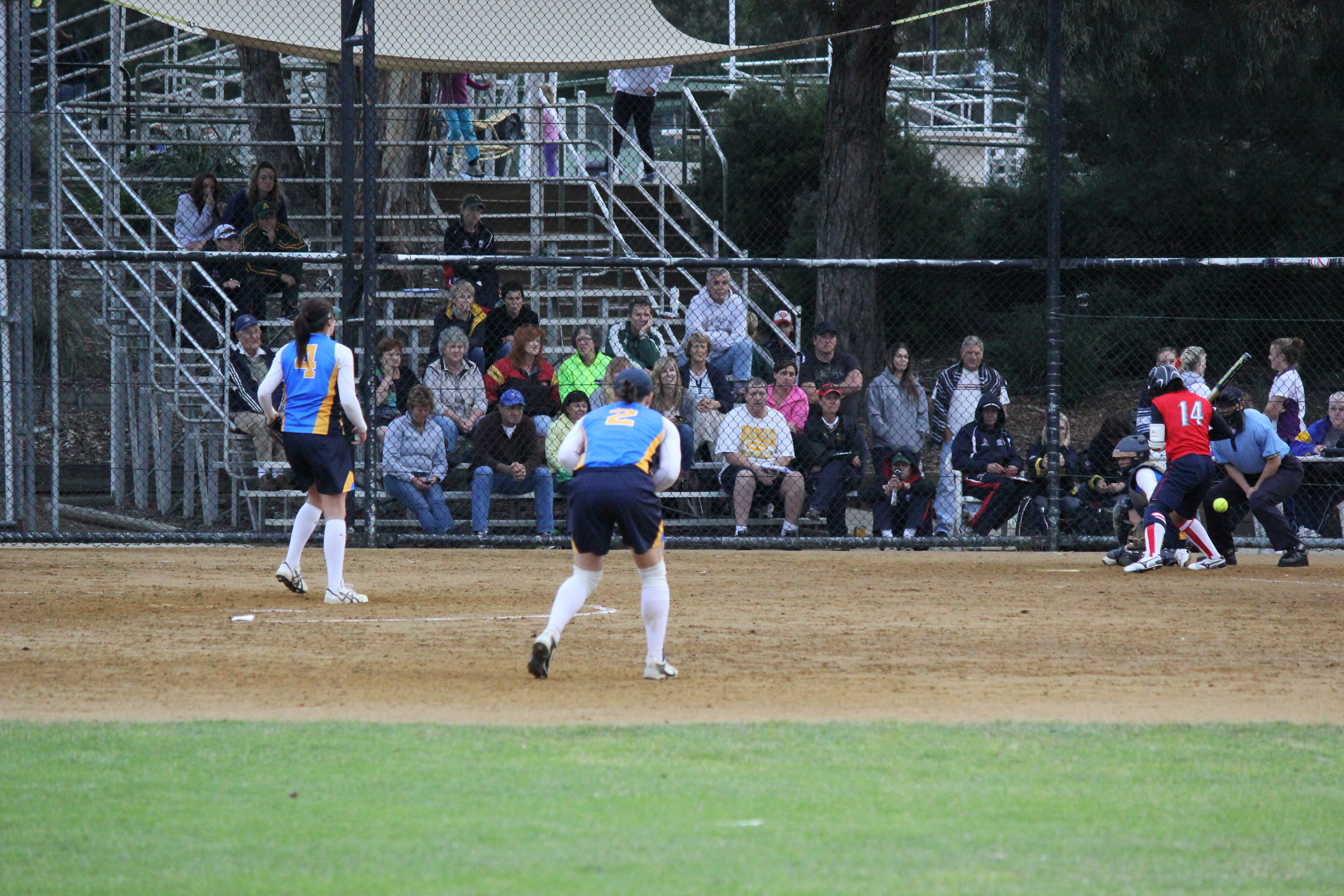
The 19 March 2012 game at Hawker International Softball Centre between the ACT representative side and the Japanese national team. No. 2 is Clare Warwick. No. 4 is Justine Smethurst.

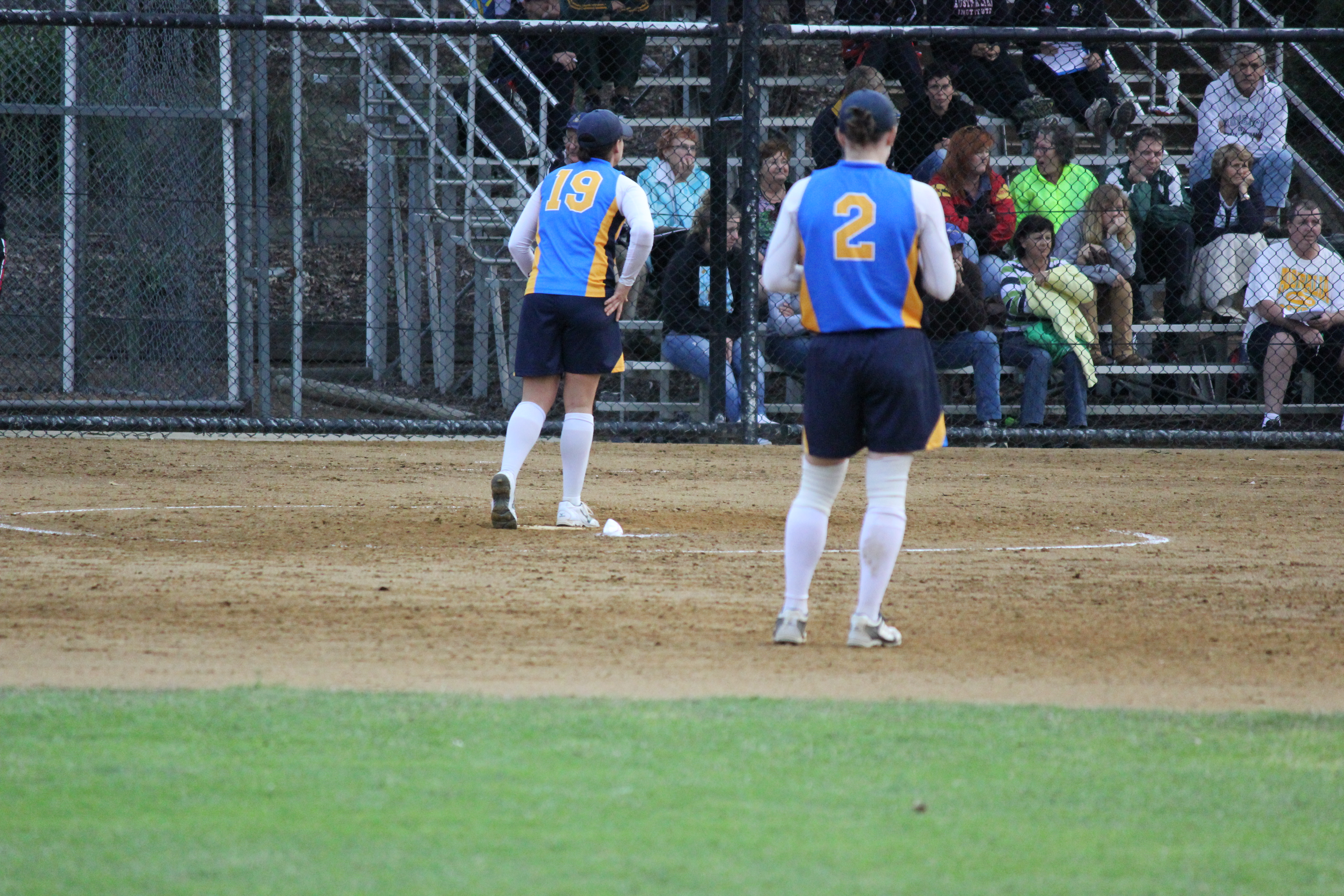
The 19 March 2012 game at Hawker International Softball Centre between the ACT representative side and the Japanese national team. No. 19 is Aimee Murch. No. 2 is Clare Warwick.

Warwick is a utility player, playing several positions depending on the need of the team she is competing for. Among the positions she can play is catcher, shortstop and third base. She plays for the Australian Capital Territory team in the national competition. She represented the state in 2003 at the national championships, where the ACT finished fourth on the ladder. She was a member of the team in 2011 and played in the Gilleys Shield match against South Australia. She has represented Australia as a member of the junior national team. She was a member of the U16 side that played in 2003 ASF Friendship series against the United States in Sydney. In 2011, she was playing club softball in the ACT women's fast-pitch competition.

=== University team ===
Warwick attended the University of Hawai'i of the Western Athletic Conference (WAC), where she was a member of the softball team from 2006 to 2009. She primarily played the third base position, and as a hitter, was second place all-time in UH history with 160 career runs scored, and third all-time in career hits with 240. She also won many athletic and scholar/athlete awards during her collegiate career there. In 2006, as a freshman, she was a NFCA Scholar-Athlete. In 2007, as a sophomore, she was named to the first team Easton All-America, named to the second team NFCA All-America, named to the first team NCAA All-West Region, and earned All-WAC first team honors as a third baseman. She was also named to the CoSIDA All-District 8 Academic first team, was honoured with being an NFCA Scholar-athlete, was named to the Academic All-WAC team, and was a University of Hawai'i Scholar-Athlete. In 2008, as a junior, she earned several honours including being named to the All-WAC second team honors as a third baseman, named to the CoSIDA All-District 8 Academic first team, the Academic All-WAC team and was an NFCA Scholar-Athlete. In 2009, as a senior, she earned several honours including being named to the All-WAC second team honors as a third baseman, and named to the CoSIDA All-District 8 Academic second team, making her the first University of Hawai'i Rainbow Wahine to ever garner three CoSIDA All-District 8 Academic honours. She was also named NFCA Scholar-athlete and to the Academic All-WAC team.

=== Senior national team ===
Warwick has represented Australia on the senior national team. In March 2011, the Australian side was selected that would represent the country during international competitions in 2011. She was one of four players from the Australian Capital Territory to gain selection. In 2011, she was a member of the Australian side that competed at the World Cup of Softball. She played in game at the Cup against the United States where Australia lost 5–2. It was her second loss on the day, also having played in a game where Australia lost to Japan. She was on the Australian side that won a bronze medal at the 2011 Canada Cup. She is a member of the 2012 Australia women's national softball team and is trying to earn a sport to compete at the 2012 ISF XIII Women's World Championships. She represented Australia in a test match against New Zealand in January 2012. The removal of softball from the Olympic programme in 2012 and 2016 has had a negative impact on her ability to compete internationally as Softball Australia received less funding from the government, which meant it was harder to fund travel for her and other national team members to attend top level international competitions.

Warwick was selected for the Australian women's national softball team at the 2020 Summer Olympics. The team came away with one win out of five, beating Italy 1-0 in their second match of the Round Robin and finished fifth overall. Full details are in Australia at the 2020 Summer Olympics.

=== Professional softball ===
Warwick played professionally for Baseball Softball Club Legnano of the Italian Softball League from 2010 to 2015. She departed from Australia in late March 2012 to join her Italian side.

== Recognition ==
In 2011, she was recognised by the Australian Institute of Sport when she named as having earned a Sport Achievement Award.
