= Brenda De Blaes =

Australian softball player

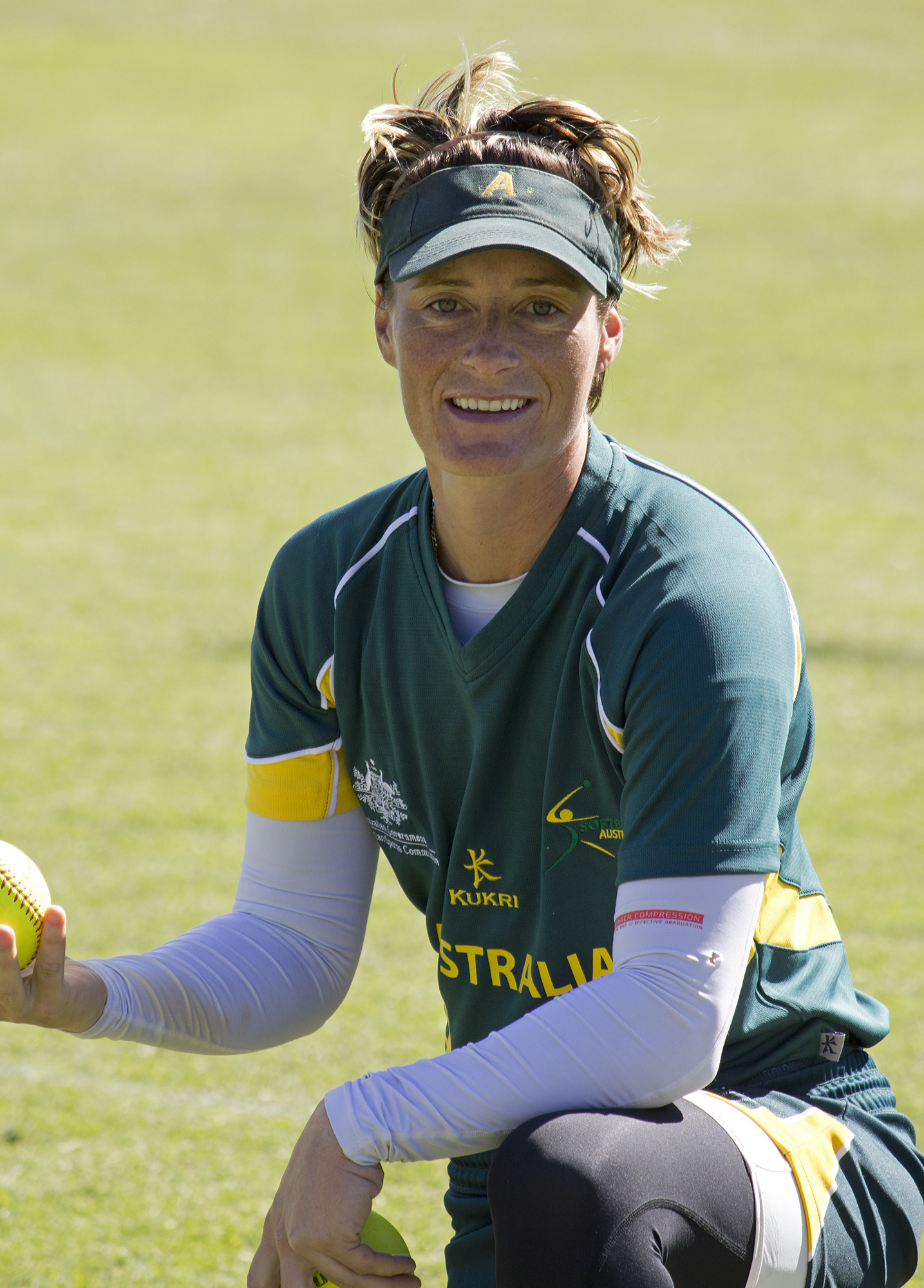
- De Blaes in March 2012 during a photoshoot

Personal information
- Nationality: Australian
- Born: April 1979 (age 47) Antwerp, Belgium

Sport
- Country: Australia
- Sport: Softball
- Event: Women's team
- Team: DES Caserta

Brenda De Blaes (born April 1979 in Antwerp, Belgium) is an Australian softball player. She resides in Canberra where she plays club softball and represents the territory in national competitions. She is a member of the Australia women's national softball team and has competed at the 2009 World Cup and the 2010 World Cup of Softball. She is vying for a spot on the team that will compete at the 2012 ISF XIII Women's World Championships.

== Personal ==
De Blaes was born in April 1979 in Antwerp, Belgium. She resides in the Australian Capital Territory. She moved to Australia in 2005. Her Australian citizenship application was expedited to allow her to represent Australia at the 2008 Summer Olympics, but she did not end up representing Australia at the Games.

== Baseball ==
De Blaes played baseball as a nine-year-old in her native Belgium. She was a member of the Belgium junior national baseball team until she was a fourteen-year-old.

== Softball ==
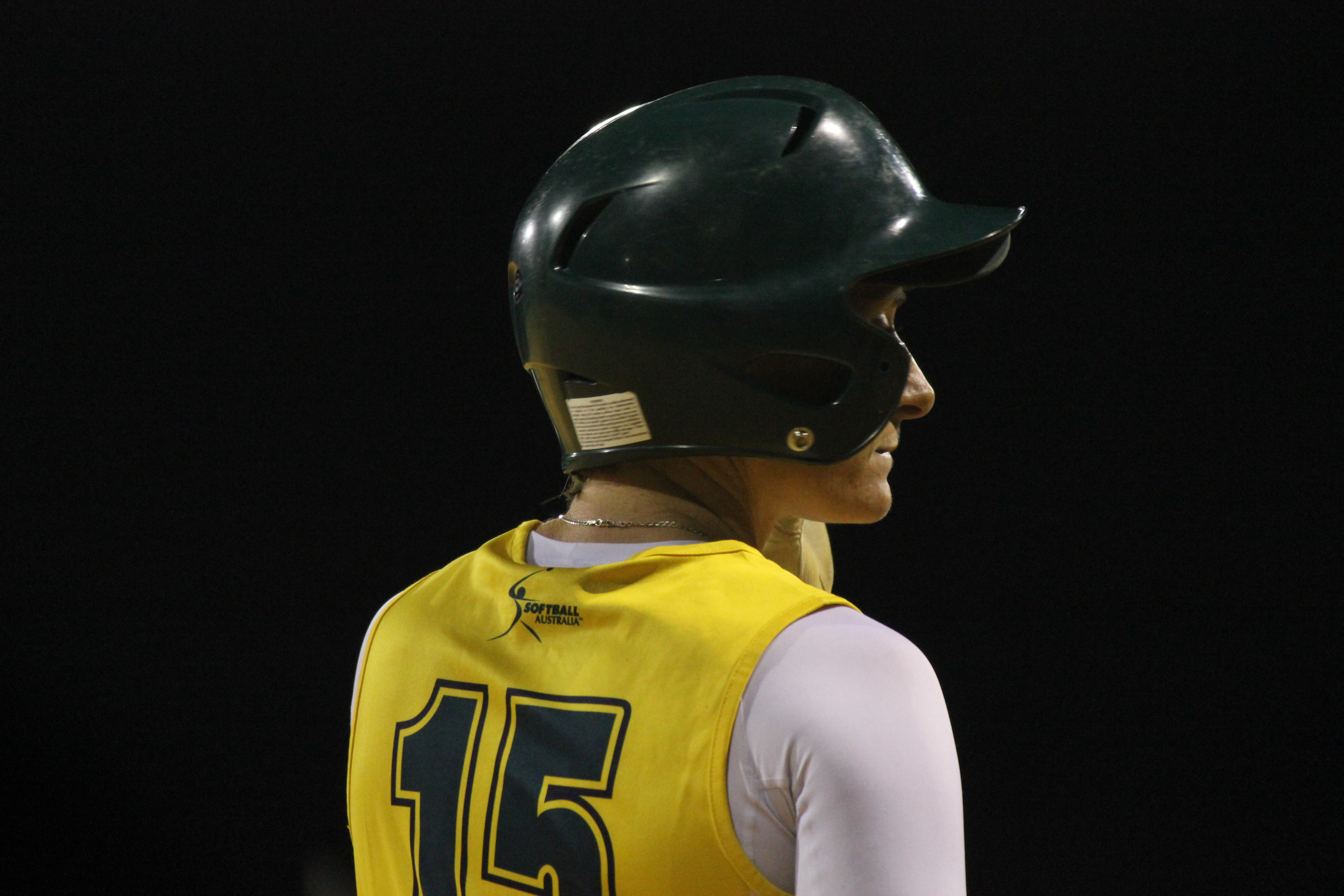
De Blaes in a game against Japan on 21 March 2012

De Blaes took up softball as a fifteen-year-old. She plays shortstop and second base. She plays club softball for the league run by Softball ACT. She was with a local club in 2011.

=== State team ===
De Blaes plays for the Australian Capital Territory team in the national competition. She was a member of the team in 2011. She represented the state in 2011. In 2012, she represented the ACT in the Gilley's Shield. In the final match against New South Wales, she scored the team's only run, a home run, in the team's 2–1 loss. She was named the tournament's MVP.

=== University softball ===
De Blaes played university softball in the United States. While competing in the United States, she earned several honours including being named the First Team All American Award, ASA Women's National, and Connecticut 1995: Most Valuable Player.

=== Belgium national team ===
De Blaes was a member of the Belgium women's national softball team. She represented the country until she turned twenty-five years old. As a member of the team, she participated in Olympic qualification competitions. She competed in the Women's World Championships in 1994 as a fifteen-year-old. In 2002, she earned the Best Batter title at the European Cup, where she was playing for Belgium. In 2003, she was named the Sports Woman of the Year, Antwerp, Belgium. In 2004, she was named the Most Valuable Player, European Cup for Belgium.

=== Australian national team ===
De Blaes is a member of the Australia women's national softball team. She represented Australia at the 2009 World Cup, where she pitched in the game against Italy that Australia won 8–0 because of the mercy rule. She hit a double in the game which scored two runs for Australia. 2009 was the year she also first held a scholarship at the Australian Institute of Sport. She held on to her scholarship during 2010. In 2010, she represented Australia at the World Championships in Caracas, Venezuela. In March 2011, the Australian side was selected that would represent the country during international competitions in 2011. She was one of four players from the Australian Capital Territory to gain selection. In 2011, she was a member of the Australian side that competed at the World Cup of Softball. She played in the 8–0 loss to the United States. She is a member of the 2012 Australia women's national softball team and is vying for a spot on the team that will compete at the 2012 ISF XIII Women's World Championships. The removal of softball from the Olympic programme in 2012 and 2016 has had a negative impact on her ability to compete internationally as Softball Australia received less funding from the government, which meant it was harder to fund travel for her and other national team members to attend top level international competitions.

=== Professional softball ===
De Blaes played softball for an Italian professional team in 2011. She signed with an Italian DES Caserta side during the 2011/2012 offseason. Playing in the Italian league, she was named in the All Star Team, Italian Softball League in 2005 and 2008. She has also played softball in the Netherlands.
