= Vigoro =

Team sport, played mainly by women in Australia

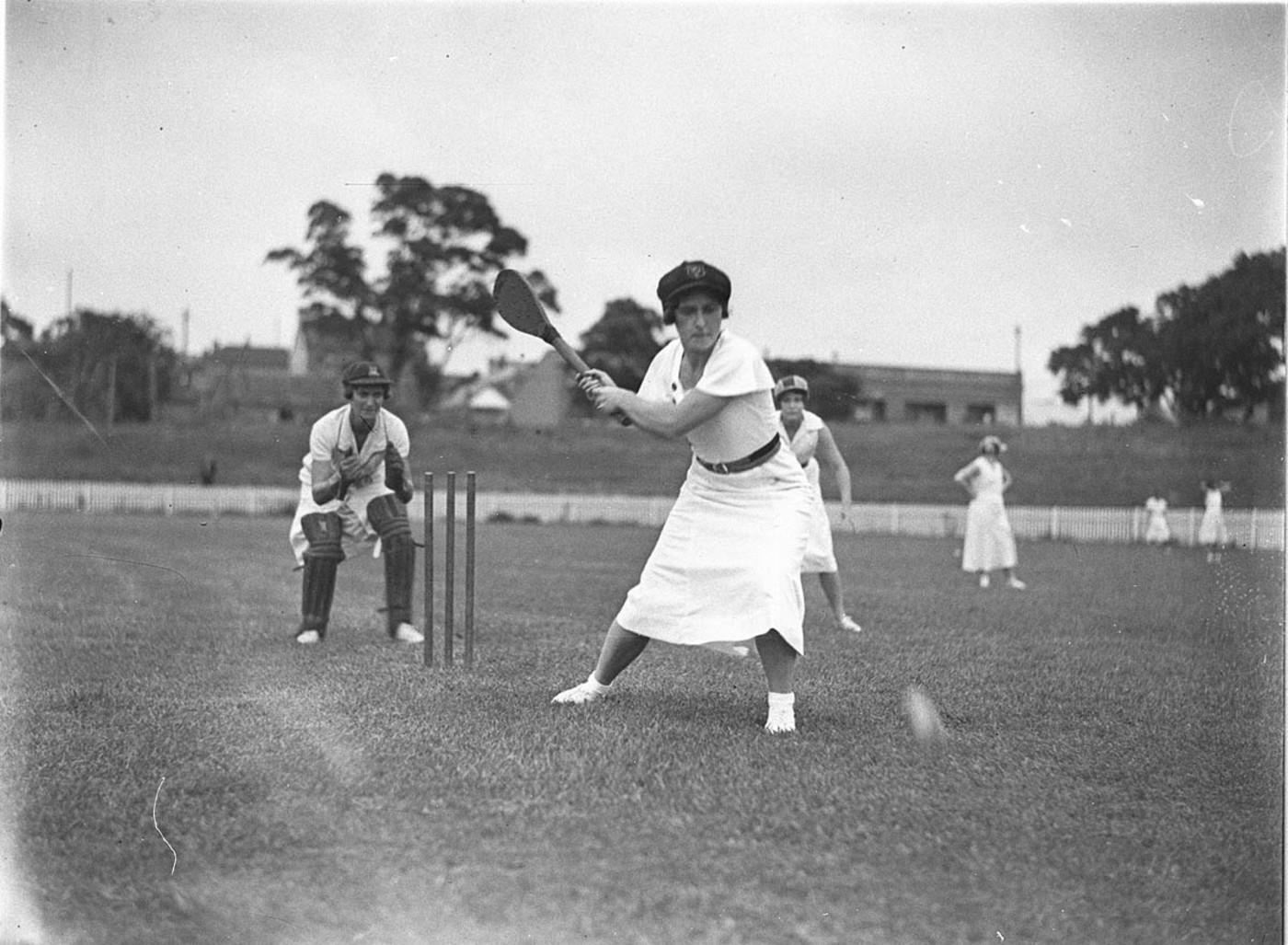
Vigoro players in action at the wicket, circa 1929

Vigoro is a team sport, played mainly by women in Australia, that originally combined elements of cricket and tennis, although in its current form it may be more similar to cricket and baseball.

== History ==
The game was invented in 1901 by Englishman John George Grant. (Note: In early publications on the game the Hon. Algernon Grosvenor is also mentioned as inventor.) In the original version tennis rackets were used and the wicket consisted of six stumps. On 17 October 1902, a match was played before the MCC committee at Lord's. An eleven led by real tennis and rackets player Eustace Miles, and including Wimbledon champions Laurence and Reginald Doherty, defeated the opposition, led by Surrey batsman Bobby Abel. Miles' team led after the first innings by 73 to 18 runs and won by an innings after Abel's team made only 39 runs in the second innings. That same month the game was also played at Crystal Palace. Games were also played that year, and in 1903, at London's Queen's Club. In England interest in the game died down after a few years but it managed to gain a foothold in Australia where it was introduced during World War I. A key figure in the promotion of the game in Australia was Ettie Dodge, who was President (1919–66) of the New South Wales Women's Vigoro Association and foundation president (1932–66) of the All Australian Vigoro Association. Ettie's husband had met John George Grant in England. When the game was introduced to New South Wales schools in the 1920s, Dodge & Co. began selling vigoro equipment. Grant died in 1927 and bequeathed the trademark and copyright of the game to Ettie.

== Description ==
Vigoro is played on a pitch which shall be no shorter than 17.68 metres [58 feet], which is slightly shorter in length than a cricket pitch. The balls are much lighter than those for cricket, and the bat has a different shape with a long handle resembling the shape of a paddle.

There are two teams of 12 players which will bat and field two innings each (except in the event that a team wins with an innings in hand). The aim of the game is for a team to score more runs than the opposition team.

There are no overs and the batsmen bat from one end only. Two bowlers bowl alternately and can incorporate any type of "throwing" action as long as the ball is released above the shoulder (i.e. not underarm).

If the ball is hit forward of the crease, the batter must run.

A run is completed each time both batters safely make it to the crease at the opposite end of the pitch. Fours and sixes also apply where the batter hits the ball past the boundary markers. In addition to shots made off the bat, byes and leg-byes add to the team's score.

Players may be dismissed by the same methods as in cricket – bowled, caught, run out, stumped, leg before wicket, hit wicket, handled ball and hit the ball twice.

== Interstate competition ==
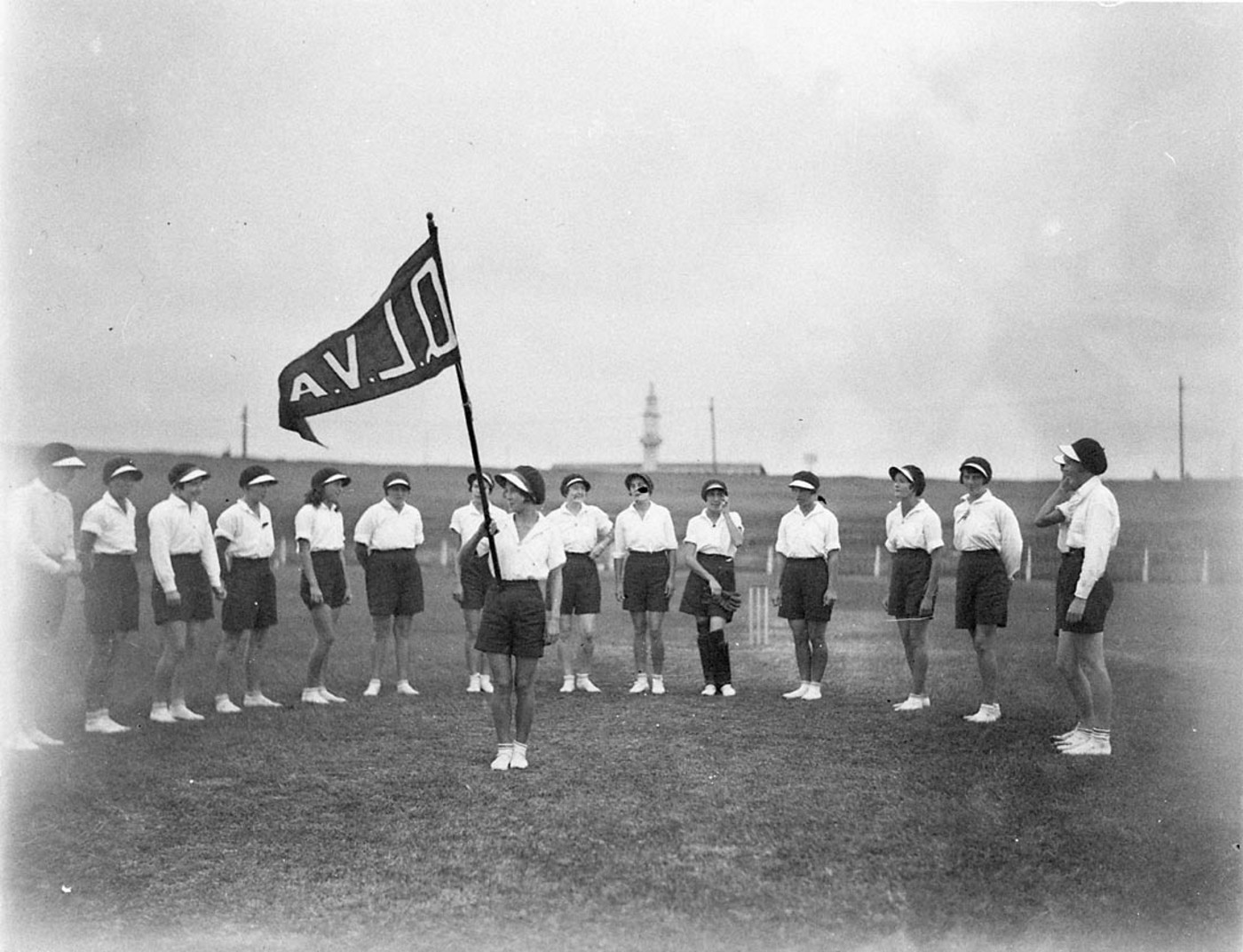
Queensland Ladies Vigoro Association Team (archive photo possibly taken in the 1930s)

Teams from Tasmania, New South Wales and Queensland compete annually for the All Australian Vigoro Titles. These teams compete across four divisions – State (Senior) One and Two, Veterans and Juniors.

Year	Host state	Division winners			
Year	Host state	State 1	State 2	State juniors	State veterans
2011	NSW	NSW	NSW	Queensland	NSW

== Competing states ==
New South Wales, Tasmania, and Queensland are the only states in Australia which host local competitions.

The 2010 Australian Vigoro Titles were held in Bendigo, the first time they had been contested in Victoria.

Four vigoro associations continued to play in 2022.

== See also ==
- Cricket
- Forms of cricket
- Sport in Australia
- Stoolball
