= Gilleys Shield =

Champions
- 1947: Victoria
- 1948: no event held
- 1949: Victoria
- 1950: Victoria
- 1951: Victoria
- 1952: Western Australia
- 1953: Western Australia
- 1954: Victoria
- 1955: Western Australia
- 1956: South Australia
- 1957: Victoria
- 1958: Victoria
- 1959: Western Australia
- 1960: Victoria
- 1961: Victoria
- 1962: Victoria
- 1963: Queensland
- 1964: Victoria
- 1965: Victoria
- 1966: Queensland
- 1967: Victoria
- 1968: Queensland
- 1969: New South Wales
- 1970: Victoria
- 1971: Victoria
- 1972: Victoria
- 1973: New South Wales
- 1974: Victoria
- 1975: Queensland
- 1976: Victoria
- 1977: Victoria
- 1978: Australia Capital Territory
- 1979: Australia Capital Territory
- 1980: Australia Capital Territory
- 1981: Victoria and New South Wales
- 1982: Victoria
- 1983: Queensland
- 1984: Queensland
- 1985: Victoria
- 1986: New South Wales
- 1987: Queensland
- 1988: New South Wales
- 1989: New South Wales
- 1990: New South Wales
- 1991: New South Wales
- 1992: Queensland
- 1993: New South Wales
- 1994: Queensland
- 1995: Queensland
- 1996: Queensland
- 1997: New South Wales
- 1998: Queensland
- 1999: New South Wales
- 2000: New South Wales
- 2001: New South Wales
- 2002: Queensland
- 2003: Queensland
- 2004: New South Wales
- 2005: New South Wales
- 2006: Queensland
- 2007: Queensland
- 2008: New South Wales
- 2009: Queensland
- 2010: Western Australia
- 2011: Western Australia
- 2012: New South Wales
- 2013: Western Australia
- 2014: New South Wales
- 2015: New South Wales
- 2016: Queensland
- 2017: New South Wales
- 2018: New South Wales
- 2019: New South Wales
- 2020: New South Wales
- 2021: Cancelled
- 2022: South Australia
- 2023: New South Wales
- 2024: New South Wales
- 2025: South Australia
- 2026: New South Wales

The Gilleys Shield is a trophy symbolising the Open Women's Championship of the Softball Australia organisation (formerly known as the Australian Softball Federation). The competition's full name is the Mack Gilley Shield.

== History ==
In 1947, Queensland, New South Wales and Victoria participated in the first interstate softball competition in the country. The competition was eventually called the Mack Gilley Shield. For the 2009–2010 season the Shield will for the first time admit the New Zealand White Sox team to the competition.

== Winners ==
Between 1947 and 1968, New South Wales did not win a single Mack Gilley Shield. They finally won in 1969, repeating their first-place finish again in 1973, 1981 when they shared the title with Victoria, 1986, 1988, 1989, 1990, 1991 and 1993. Between the start of the competition and 1995, New South Wales won a total of nine Gilley Shields. This total ranked them third amongst all states.

Queensland won the Mack Gilley Shield in 1963, 1966 and 1968. They won again in 1975, 1983, 1984, 1987, 1992 and 1994. In 2012, Queensland finished third in the Gilley Shield. Between the start of the competition and 1995, Queensland won a total of ten Gilley Shields. This total ranked them second amongst all states.

Victoria won the Mack Gilley Shield in 1947, 1949, 1950, and 1951. They won it again in 1954, 1957 and 1958. They did not win in 1959 but won again in 1960, 1961 and 1962. Queensland won in 1963, but Victoria won again in 1964 and 1965 and 1967. Victoria went on to win again in 1970, 1971, 1972, 1974, 1976, 1977, and shared the title with New South Wales in 1981. They won again in 1982, and 1985. Between the start of the competition and 1995, Victoria won a total of twenty-two Gilley Shields if the 1981 tie with New South Wales is counted. This was twelve more than any other state.

Between 1947 and 1994, Tasmania did not win a single Mack Gilley Shield.

South Australia won the Mack Gilley Shield in 1956. Between 1957 and 1994, they did not win another championship.

Western Australia won the Mack Gilley Shield in 1952 and 1953. They did not win in 1954 but won it again in 1955. They missed out in winning from 1956 to 1958, before winning again in 1959. They did not win another championship between 1960 and 1994.

Between 1947 and 1968, the Australian Capital Territory did not win the Mack Gilley Shield. They finally broke their losing streak by winning in 1978, 1979 and 1980. They did not win again between 1981 and 1994.

Between 1947 and 1968, the Northern Territory did not win the Mack Gilley Shield. They did not win between 1969 and 1994.

== Hosting ==
New South Wales hosted the Mack Gilley Shield in Sydney in 1950, 1955, 1961, and 1968. Queensland hosted the Mack Gilley Shield in Brisbane in 1947, 1953, 1959 and 1966. Victoria hosted the Mack Gilley Shield in Melbourne in 1949, 1954, 1960 and 1967. Tasmania hosted the Mack Gilley Shield in Hobart in 1958, 1964 and 1985. South Australia hosted the Mack Gilley Shield in Adelaide in 1951, 1956, and 1962. Western Australia hosted the Mack Gilley Shield in Perth in 1952, 1957, and 1963. The Australian Capital Territory hosted the Mack Gilley Shield in Canberra in 1965. Between 1947 and 1968, the Northern Territory did not host the Mack Gilley Shield.

== Gilleys Shield Awards ==
There are several awards connected with the Shield including the Midge Nelson Medal for the competition's most valuable player, the Lorraine Woolley Medal for pitching and the Sybil turner Medal for the best batting. In 1985, the Nelson Medal was won by K. Dienelt of the Northern Territory and the Woolley Medal was won by L. Evans of Victoria. In 1986, the Nelson Medal was won by H. Strauss of Queensland and the Woolley Medal was won by C. Bruce of New South Wales. In 1987, the Nelson Medal was won by K. Dienelt of the Northern Territory and the Woolley Medal was won by C. Cunderson of Queensland. 1988 was the first year all three medals were awarded. They were won respectively by L. Ward of New South Wales, M. Roche of New South Wales and V. Grant of Western Australia. In 1989, they respectively went to L. Loughman of Victoria, M. Rouche of New South Wales and L. Martin of South Australia. In 1990, they went to K, McCracken of Victoria, M. Rouche of New South Wales, and G. Ledingham of New South Wales.

- AWARD NAMES
  - Midge Nelson Medal – Most Valuable Player
  - Rosemary Adey Medal – Rookie of the Year
  - Lorraine Woolley Medal – Best Pitcher
  - Sybil Turner Medal – Best Batter

=== Previous Individual Award Winners ===
- 2003
  - Most Valuable Player – Tanya Harding (QLD)
  - Rookie of the Year – Melanie Dunne (QLD)
  - Best Pitcher – Kelly Hardie (QLD)
  - Best Batter – Kerrie Sheehan (NSW)
- 2004
  - Most Valuable Player – Tanya Harding (QLD
  - Rookie of the Year – Kylie Cronk (QLD)
  - Best Pitcher – Brooke Wilkins (QLD)
  - Best Batter – Natalie Titcume (VIC)
- 2005
  - Most Valuable Player – Natalie Titcume (VIC)
  - Rookie of the Year – Krystle Rivers (WA)
  - Best Pitcher – Jocelyn McCallum (QLD)
  - Best Batter – Amanda Doman (QLD)
- 2006
  - Most Valuable Player – Amanda Doman (QLD)
  - Rookie of the Year – Nicole Smith (ACT)
  - Best Pitcher – Kelly Hardie (QLD)
  - Best Batter – Stacey Porter (NSW)

== See also ==
- Softball Australia
- ASF National Championships
