= Softball in Australia =

- Country: Australia
- Governing body: Softball Australia
- National team: Australia
- Nickname: Aussie Steelers (Men); Aussie Spirit (Women)

National competitions
- ASF National Championships

International competitions
- Men's Softball World Championship; Women's Softball World Championship

Softball in Australia is played in Australia.

== History ==
The game was first played in Australia in 1939, having been introduced to the country by Gordon Young of Canada, who at the time was the director of physical education in New South Wales. Prior to the Second World War, vigoro was one of the sports played by women in Australia. With the introduction of softball during the war, the game fell out of popularity and was replaced with softball in the eastern states. The game was introduced to a wider audience in 1942 by American nurses stationed in the country during the war. Their matches were organized by US Army Sargeant William Duvernet. The Victorian Women's Softball Association was created two years later in 1944. The association at the time of its founding had 20 teams, 250 members and staged regular competitions. Women's participation in softball led to a decline in the number of women participating in cricket at this time. A Queensland organisation was created in 1946 by the American Mack Gilley. By 1946, the big states had their own association. In 1947, at the behest of Queensland, the first interstate championships were held in Brisbane, with the Victorians claiming victory. Only New South Wales, Victoria and Queensland competed at the innaurgal event.

There were efforts by the Australian Softball Council as early as 1950 to get softball on the Olympic programme for possible inclusion at the 1956 Summer Olympics.

After the failure of getting softball on the 1956 Olympic programme, an attempt was made by Western Australians to get softball included on the schedule at the 1962 British Empire Games that were going to be held in Perth. Empire Games organisers did not support this as they allowed neither team sports, nor demonstration sports at the Games.

== Governance ==
The first national organisation for women's softball was created in 1947 as a result of talks at the first interstate championships and named the Australian Women's Softball Council. It was originally composed of representatives from New South Wales, South Australia, Queensland and Victoria. Other states and territories were later added: Western Australia in 1951, Tasmania in 1952, the Australian Capital Territory in 1961, and the Northern Territory in 1978. The organisation would later change its name do the Australian Softball Federation. Australia's national organisation was recognised by the international governing body, the International Softball Federation, in 1953. In 1995, the organisation was based in Bayswater, Victoria and had 60,000 members.

== Funding ==
The national team has not secured as much funding as male dominated sports in Australia despite having performed better than some and having won major international competitions. As of 1999, softball was not being supported by all state and territory based institute of sports. Only the ACT, the New South Wales Institute of Sport, the Queensland Academy of Sport and the Victorian Institute of Sport did. The federal government allocated money to sport through a variety of methods. When combined, softball was allocated A$1,265,200 in 1995/1996, A$1,275,900 in 1996/1997, A$1,548,600 in 1997/1998, A$1,625,700 in 1998/1999, and A$1,767,500 in 1999/2000.

== National championships ==
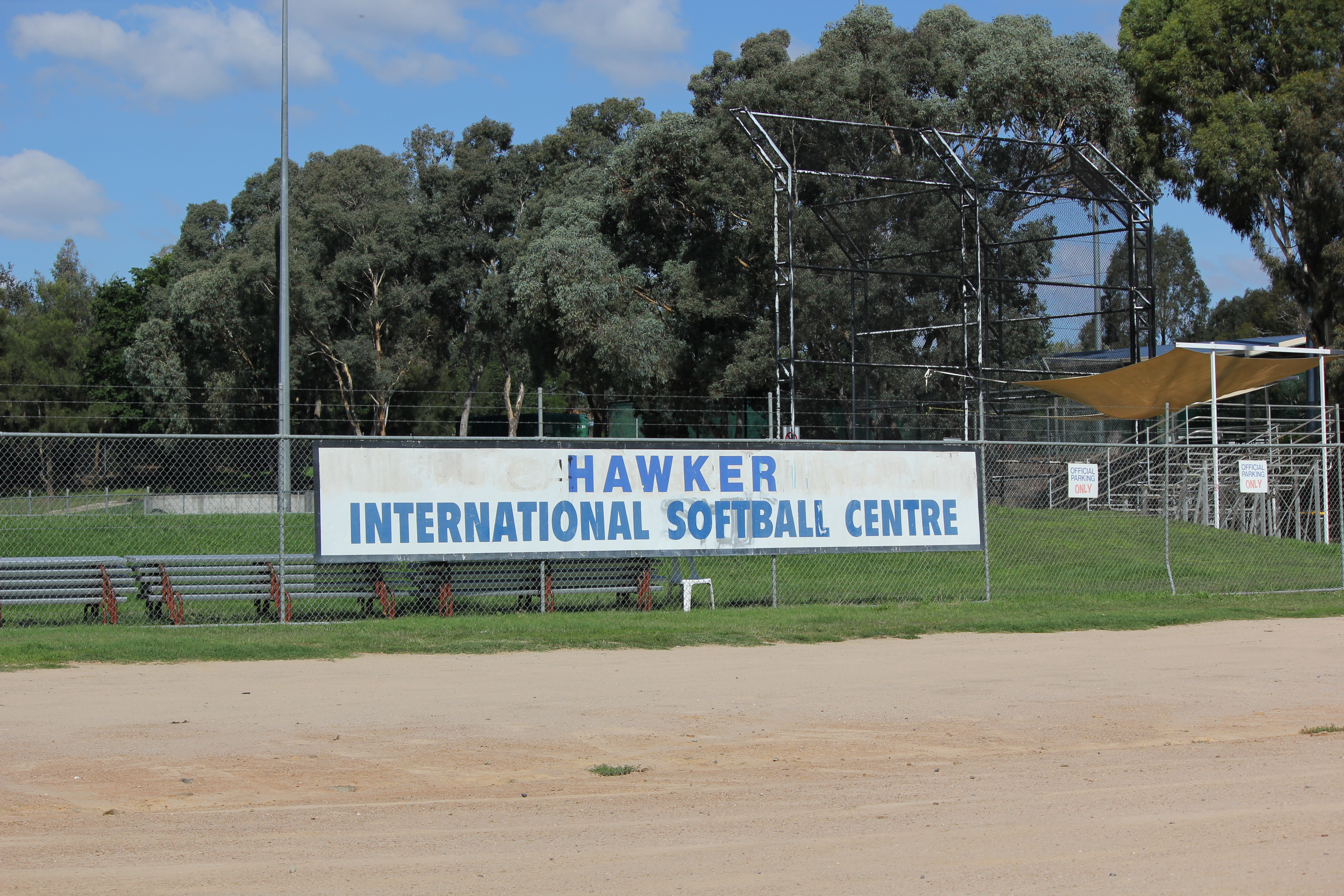
Hawker International Softball Centre in Canberra

There are several national championships held for men and women in Australia. The championships occur every year, with hosting rights given to states in the order they were admitted to the Australian Women's Softball Council. The championships are the Mack Gilley Shield for the open women, the Elinor McKenzie Shield for the U19 women, the Ester Deason Shield for the U16 women, the John Reid Shield for the open men, and the Nox Bailey Shield for the U19 men. In the Gilley Shield, Victoria won every Shield between 1947 and 1951, Western Australia won in 1952 and 1953 before Victoria won again in 1954. Western Australia won in 1955 with the South Australians winning in 1965. Victoria won in consecutively in 1957 and 1958, before Western Australia went on to win in 1959. Victoria went on a winning streak again winning in 1960, 1961 and 1962. Queensland interrupted their streak with a win in 1963. Victoria won again in 1964 and 1965. Queensland and Victoria went on to trade wins with Queensland in 1966, Victoria in 1967 and Queensland in 1968.

== Play ==
Softball is played in Australia during the summer and the winter.

== Education ==
The University of Melbourne required physical education students to learn about softball as part of the programme's curriculum. This helped spur the inclusion of the sport in the curriculum at secondary schools and colleges around the state of Victoria.

== International competitions ==
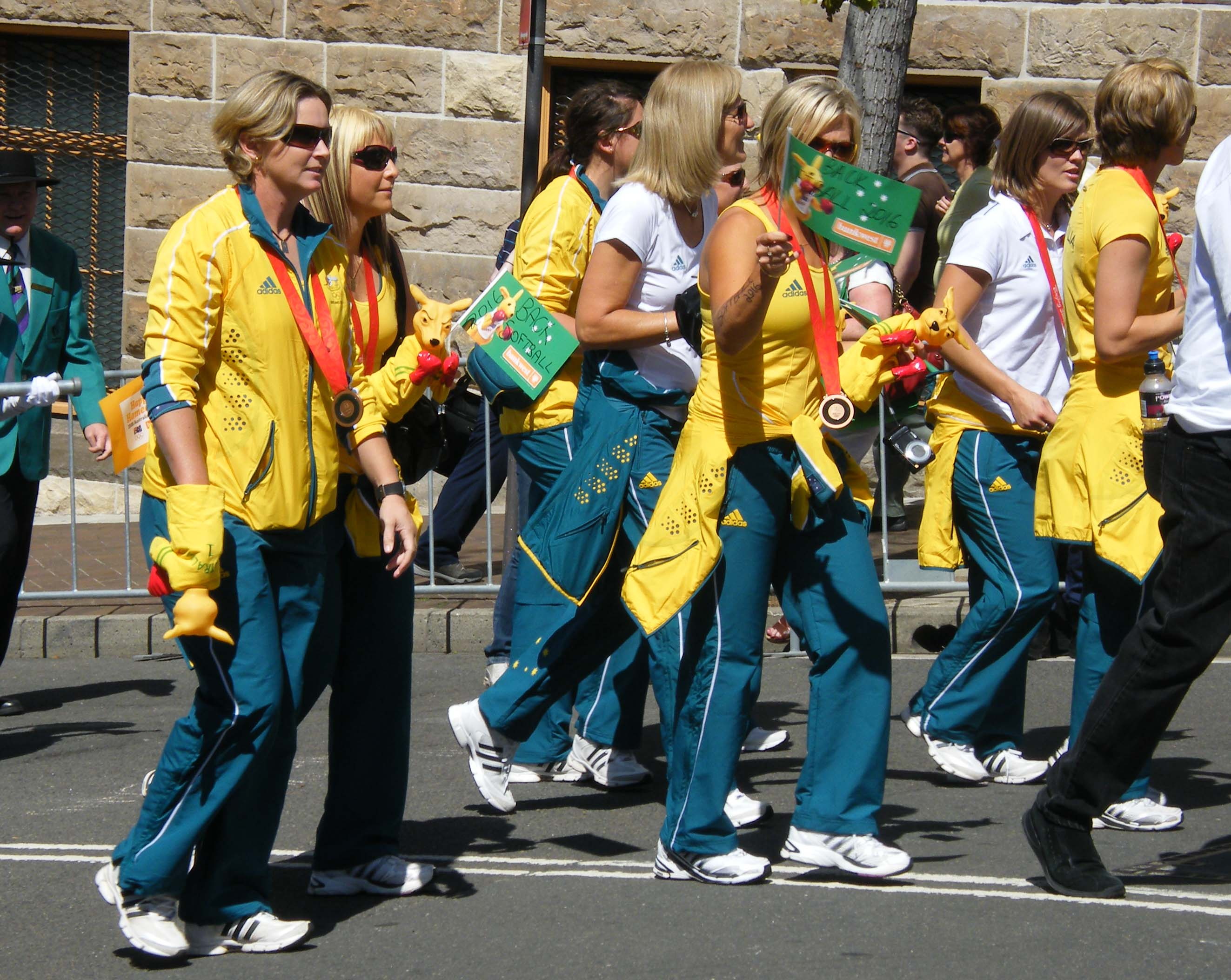
Parade of Olympians – Sydney 2008 – Women's softball team

Australian women competed in their first international competition in 1949 when they played a series against New Zealand in St Kilda at the St Kilda Cricket Ground. 10,000 people watched the game live. The first international for Australian women took place in 1951 when the Australians toured New Zealand. Australia won both games against the New Zealanders. In 1960, Australia hosted its first international tournament with national teams from Australia, New Zealand and South Africa competing. At the tournament, Australia beat South Africa by a score of 2–1. Australia hosted the event again in 1962, where they beat the New Zealanders in the final 2–1. At the ISF Women's World Championship, Australia finished first in 1965 and second in 1998. The 1965 victory was considered very impressive as they beat the Americans, who invented the game in 1887, to win the championship. Between 1949 and 1967, Australia's senior women's side was undefeated in international play.

== On television ==
The first softball World Series, called the Diamond International trophy, was hosted by Australia. World television rights were sold for the event by the International Softball Federation for A$6,500.

== Participation ==
In 1995, an estimated 200,000 children regularly played softball in organised school based games.

== Aboriginal and Torres Strait Islanders ==
Australian aboriginals have represented the country as members of the national team. One such player was Joanne Lesiputty, born in 1966, who also represented Australia in a number of other sports including basketball and netball. Her selection to the senior national softball team occurred in 1987. She was granted a federal scholarship for "young Aboriginal sporting achievers" in 1989. Australian aboriginals have been present on state representative sides for softball including Rose Damaso who represented the Northern Territory. Softball is the most popular sport for Aboriginal women to play. In March 2012, Softball Australia and the federal government announced a program to further increase aboriginal participation in softball as a way of promoting healthier lifestyles in the community.

== Men ==
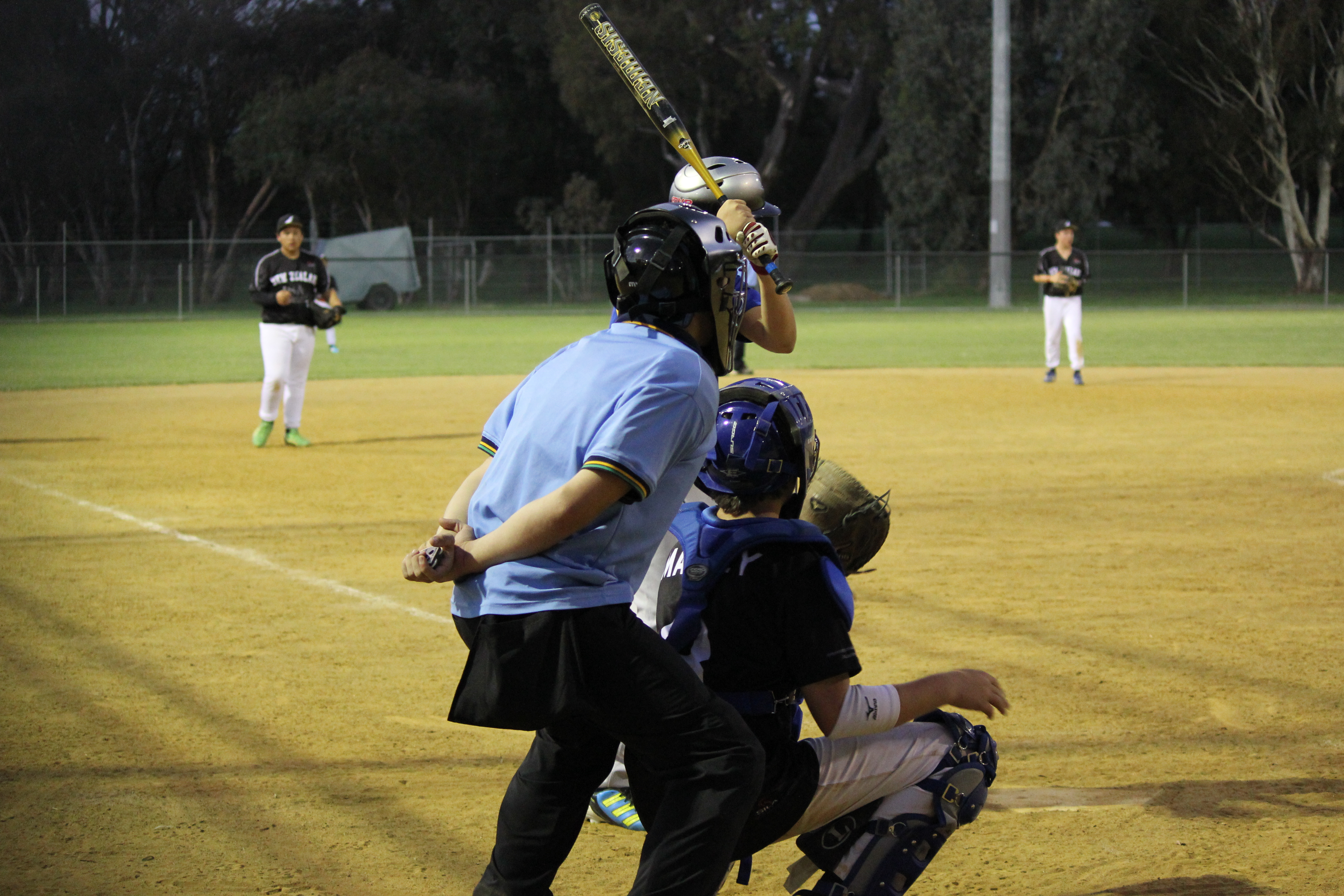
Men's softball being played in the Australian Capital Territory

A national men's association for softball was created in 1949 and was the first of its kind for men's softball in Australia. The organisation folded within the year because men's softball could not compete for participation with other popular Australian sports like Australian rules football, rugby league, cricket and baseball. The popularity of softball for men started happening in the late 1970s. In 1994, estimates put male participation in the sport at fifty-thousand regular competitors. Men's world championships were first held in Mexico City in 1966 and have been held every four years since. Australia did not send a team to this competition. Australia has never hosted the men's championships, nor won it or been runners up. Australia's men competed at the 1988 Men's Softball World Series, the first Softball World Series for men.

== See also ==
- Softball Australia
