= Australian national sports team nicknames =

In Australia, the national representative team of many sports has a nickname, used informally when referring to the team in the media or in conversation. These nicknames are typically derived from well-known symbols of Australia. Often the nickname is combined with that of a commercial sponsor, such as the "Qantas Wallabies" or the "Telstra Dolphins". Some names are a portmanteau word with second element -roo, per Australian animals kangaroo or wallaroo; such as "Olyroos" for the Olympic association (soccer) football team.

== History ==
The oldest nicknames are Kangaroos and Wallabies for the rugby league football and rugby union teams respectively. The other names are more recent, mostly invented to help publicise sports not traditionally popular in Australia. Some journalists have criticised the practice as embarrassing, gimmicky, or PR-driven.

The name "Wallabies" was chosen by the 1908 rugby union side, making its first tour of the Northern Hemisphere. British newspapers had already nicknamed the 1905 New Zealand touring team the "All Blacks" from their sporting uniform predominant colour; the 1906 South African tourists had adopted "Springboks". "Rabbits" was first suggested in Sydney for the 1908 Australians, but rejected since rabbits there are notorious as pests. Upon arriving in England, at a team vote "Wallabies" was chosen ahead of "Waratahs" and "Wallaroos". Until 1984, only touring sides were "Wallabies"; players on the eight tours up to 1984 were "the First Wallabies" up to "the Eighth Wallabies".In 1994 the Australian national women's rugby union team was named "The Wallaroos" in tribute to Australia's first open rugby club Wallaroo FC.

The rugby league tour side arrived in Britain later in 1908 with a live kangaroo as mascot, a kangaroo on their jersey badge, and were nicknamed "Kangaroos". "Kangaroos" originally referred only to teams on "Kangaroo Tours" to Britain and France. In 1994 the Australian Rugby League extended the nickname to all internationals for sponsorship reasons, drawing criticism for the break with tradition. The first such game was a 58–0 win over France at Parramatta Stadium on 6 July 1994. The Australian national women's rugby league team c.2000 adopted the name "The Jillaroos", based on the jillaroo (a female jackaroo).

Among the longer-established sports, the test cricket and Davis Cup tennis teams have no common nickname. Harry Beitzel's 1967 Australian Football World Tour team was unofficially nicknamed the Galahs from their flashy uniform. Though this side was a precursor of subsequent Australian international rules football teams, the nickname has not been retained.

Australian Tennis magazine invited readers to suggest a nickname for the Davis Cup team in 1996. The Australia Fed Cup team has been called the Cockatoos, first suggested by player Casey Dellacqua in a press conference at the April 2012 match against Germany. The name has been embraced by teammates and used on the website of governing body Tennis Australia.

As part of a 1998 strategic business plan, Cricket Australia surveyed "stakeholders" in 1998 about a possible nickname, to enhance marketing opportunities. State cricket teams in the Sheffield Shield had benefited from adopting nicknames in the 1990s. 69% opposed a national nickname, partly from a sense of decorum and partly because the best names were already taken by other teams.

Athletics Australia held a competition for a nickname for its squad for the 2001 World Athletics Championships. The winning entry was "the Diggers", from the nickname for ANZAC soldiers. This was quickly abandoned after criticism from the Returned and Services League of Australia and others that this was an inappropriate use of the term. The team previously had a little-used nickname, "the Blazers".

In December 2004, the Australian Soccer Association renamed itself Football Federation Australia (FFA) and announced an effort to rebrand association football as "football" rather than "soccer" in Australia. The national team had been nicknamed "the Socceroos" by journalist Tony Horstead on a 1967 tour to South Vietnam. FFA chairman Frank Lowy commented "It has been commonly used and is a much loved name but we may see it fade out as evolution takes place", and suggested few national football teams had nicknames. By 2016, the FFA announcement of Caltex as sponsors was titled "Caltex Australia with the Socceroos all the way".

== Table ==
Sport	Team (link to team / event)	Nickname (link for origin)	Name sponsor
Roundnet	Australian National Team	Quokkas	
Rugby union	Men's test	Wallabies	Cadbury
Rugby union	Women's	Wallaroos	Paper to Paper
Rugby union	Under-21 side	Junior Wallabies	
Rugby union	Men's Sevens	Thunderbolts	
Rugby union	Women's Sevens	Pearls	
Rugby league	Men's test	Kangaroos	(Previously VB and Holden)
Rugby league	Women's	Jillaroos	Harvey Norman
Rugby league	Under-20 side	Junior Kangaroos	Holden
Wheelchair rugby	Paralympic	Steelers (official) Wheelabies (unofficial)	
Soccer	Men's	Socceroos	Commonwealth Bank
Soccer	Women's (incl. Olympic)	Matildas (from Waltzing Matilda)	Commonwealth Bank
Soccer	Olympic men's	Olyroos	Commonwealth Bank
Soccer	Under-20 (men)	Young Socceroos	Commonwealth Bank
Soccer	Under-20 (women)	Young Matildas	Commonwealth Bank
Soccer	Under-17 (men)	Joeys	Commonwealth Bank
Soccer	Under-17 (women)	Junior Matildas U17s	Commonwealth Bank
Soccer	World Medical Football Championships	Docceroos	
Soccer	Men's blind	Bilbies	
Beach Handball	Australian Women's National Team	Aussie Beach Gliders	
Futsal	National team	Futsalroos	
Goalball	Australian women's national team	Aussie Belles	
Goalball	Australian men's national team	Aussie Storm	
Netball	Women's national team	Diamonds	Origin Energy
Netball	Men's national team	Kelpies; previously known as Sonix	
Touch Football	Australian Touch Football Team	Emus	
Quizzing	Australian Quiz Team	Quokkas	
Athletics	Australian Athletics Team	Australian Flame	
Cricket	National team	Baggy Greens (officially for the caps, metonymically for the players)	Commonwealth Bank
Cricket	Women's	Southern Stars	Commonwealth Bank
Swimming	Australian Swim Team (Olympic, Paralympic, and World Championships)	Dolphins; dropped in 2009, re-introduced in 2015	Hancock Prospecting
Softball	Men's	Aussie Steelers	
Softball	Women's (Olympic / World's)	Dingeroos/Aussie spirit	
Softball	Women's U-19	Aussie Pride	
Rowing	Rowsellas		
Water polo	Men's	Sharks	
Water polo	Women's	Stingers	
Basketball	Men's	Boomers	Airbnb
Basketball	Women's	Opals	Jayco
Basketball	Under-21 (men)	Crocs	
Basketball	Under-21 (women)	Sapphires	
Basketball	Under-19 (men)	Emus	
Basketball	Men's 3 x 3	Gangurrus	
Basketball	Women's 3 x 3	Gangurrus	
Basketball	Under-19 (women)	Gems	
Basketball	Intellectual disability (men)	Boomerangs	
Basketball	Intellectual disability (women)	Pearls	
Basketball	Deaf (men)	Goannas	
Basketball	Deaf (men) - U21	Dingos	
Basketball	Deaf (women)	Geckos	
Basketball	Deaf (women) - U21	Ringtails	
Basketball	Men's wheelchair	Rollers	
Basketball	Women's wheelchair	Gliders	
Basketball	U-23 wheelchair (men)	Spinners	
Basketball	U-25 wheelchair (women)	Devils	
Basketball	Wheelchair (women) 3 x 3	Wombats	
Basketball	Wheelchair (men) 3 x 3	Wombats	
Cycling	World Championships/World Cup	Cyclones	Toshiba
Field hockey	Men's	Kookaburras	
Field hockey	Women's	Hockeyroos	None for 2007 (ANZ for 2004 Olympics)
Field hockey	Under-21 (men)	Burras	
Field hockey	Under-21 (women)	Jillaroos	
Ice hockey	Men's	Mighty Roos (after The Mighty Ducks)	
Ice hockey	Women's	Mighty Jills	
Ice hockey	Para Hockey	IceROOS	
Lacrosse	Men's	Sharks	
Lacrosse	Women's	Mellies	
Lacrosse	Men's U23s	Aussie Roos	
Lacrosse	Women's U23s	Team Koala	
Lacrosse	Men's U19s	Crocodiles	
Lacrosse	Women's U19s	Stars (after the Southern Cross)	
Lacrosse	Women's U17s	Team Koala	
Box lacrosse	Men's	Boxaroos	
Bowls	Men's	Jackaroos (a pun on jack, the target ball)	
Bowls	Women's	Sapphires	
Orienteering	National team	Boomerangs	
Team handball	Men's	Crocodiles	
Team handball	Women's	Redbacks	
Ultimate frisbee	Open	Dingos	
Ultimate frisbee	Women's	Firetails	
Ultimate frisbee	Mixed	Barramundis	
Ultimate frisbee	Women Masters	Flying Foxes	
Ultimate frisbee	Open Masters	Wombats	
Ultimate frisbee	Open Grand Masters	Numbats	
Ultimate frisbee	Under-23s Open	Goannas	
Ultimate frisbee	Under-23s Women	Stingrays	
Ultimate frisbee	Under-23s Mixed	Bluebottles	
Ultimate frisbee	Under-19s Open	Thunder	
Ultimate frisbee	Under-19s Women	Southern Terra	
Disc Golf	National Team	Sugar Gliders	
Tennis	Fed Cup	Cockatoos	
Roller derby	Men	Wizards of AUS	
Universiade	National team	Australian Uniroos	
Baseball	Men's	Southern Thunder	
Baseball	Women's	Emeralds	
Volleyball	Men's and Women's	Volleyroos; previously Kookaburras from 1988 – 1992	
Fistball	Men's	Wombats	
Fistball	Women's	Possums	
Fistball	Men's Masters	Dugongs	
Quidditch/Quadball	National Team	Dropbears	
Quidditch/Quadball	National Development Team	Aurora Australis	
Badminton	National team	Falcons	
Surfing	Olympics	Irukandjis	
Finska/Mölkky	National Team	Finskaroos	Planet Finska
Backyard ultra Marathon	National Team (Mixed)	Redback Yarders	
Kilikiti	National team	AussieRoos	

== See also ==
- Athletic nickname, in the United States
- Lists of nicknames – nickname list articles on Wikipedia
- Sport in New Zealand § National team names
