= Jillaroo =

Jillaroo may refer to:

- Jillaroo, young woman in training on a cattle station or sheep station in Australia, a female jackaroo
- Australia women's national rugby league team in international competition
- Australian women's under 21 field hockey; see Australian national sports team nicknames

== See also ==
- Jackaroo (disambiguation)
- Cowgirl (disambiguation)
- Gillaroo, trout species found in Ireland
