= Jackaroo (disambiguation) =

A jackaroo is an Australian agricultural trainee.

Jackaroo or Jackeroo may also refer to:

== Arts and entertainment ==
- Jackaroo (miniseries), a 1990 Australian miniseries
- Jackaroo, a 1985 novel by Cynthia Voigt
- Jackaroo, a character by Gary Chaloner in the comic book Cyclone!
- Jackaroo, an alien being in one of Paul J. McAuley's Jackaroo book series (2006–2016)
- The Jackeroo, an Australian radio play by Richard Barry
- The Jackeroo of Coolabong, 1920 Australian silent film

== Transport ==
- Holden Jackaroo, an Australian market name for a Japanese 4WD utility or wagon for rough ground
- Thruxton Jackaroo, a 1950s British four-seat biplane

== See also ==
- Buddy Williams (country musician), a singer-songwriter known as "the yodelling jackaroo"
- Cowboy (disambiguation)
