= Cowboy (disambiguation) =

A cowboy is a professional pastoralist or mounted livestock herder, usually from the Americas or Australia.

Cowboy(s) or The Cowboy(s) may also refer to:

== Film and television ==
- Cowboy (1958 film), starring Glenn Ford
- Cowboy (1966 film), a documentary
- The Cowboys, a 1972 Western film starring John Wayne
- Cowboy (2013 film), a Malayalam film starring Asif Ali and Bala
- Cowboys (2013 film), a Croatian film
- Les Cowboys, a 2015 French-Belgian drama film
- Cowboys (2020 film), an American film
- The Cowboys (TV series), a 1974 series based on the 1972 film
- Cowboys (TV series), a British TV sitcom
- "Cowboy" (M*A*S*H), a 1972 episode of M*A*S*H
- Cowboy, a fictional gang member in The Warriors, a 1979 film and later video game

== Groups ==
- Cochise County Cowboys, an outlaw gang which participated in the Gunfight at the O.K. Corral
- Cowboys, a group of Loyalist irregulars during the American Revolution led by Claudius Smith

== Music ==
- Cowboy (band), an American country rock band
- Cowboy Records, an American record label
- Cowboy (album), by Erasure, 1997
- "Cowboy" (Kid Rock song), 1999
- "Cowboy" (Ch!pz song), 2003
- "Cowboy" (Alma song), 2018
- "Cowboy", a song by Billy Crawford from Big City
- "Cowboy", a song by Bow Wow Wow from See Jungle! See Jungle! Go Join Your Gang Yeah, City All Over! Go Ape Crazy!
- "Cowboy", a song by f(x) from the single "4 Walls"
- "Cowboy", a song by Jon Spencer Blues Explosion from Orange
- "Cowboy", a song by Lindemann from Skills in Pills
- "Cowboy", a song by Randy Newman from Randy Newman
- "Cowboy", a song by Selena Gomez and Benny Blanco from I Said I Love You First
- "Cowboy", a song by The Sugarcubes from Life's Too Good
- "Cowboy", a song by Tyler, the Creator from Wolf
- "Cowboy", a song by the Reklaws from Good Ol' Days, 2022
- "Cowboys", a song by Slayyyter from Troubled Paradise

== Sports teams ==
- Alpine Cowboys, an American baseball team
- Calgary Cowboys, a U.S.–Canadian ice hockey franchise
- Dallas Cowboys, an American football team
- McNeese State Cowboys, the men's athletic teams of McNeese State University
- Munich Cowboys, an American football team in Germany
- New Mexico Highlands Cowboys, the men's athletic teams of New Mexico Highlands University
- North Queensland Cowboys, an Australian rugby league team
- Oklahoma State Cowboys, the men's athletic teams of Oklahoma State University - Stillwater
- Wyoming Cowboys, the men's athletic teams of the University of Wyoming

== People with the nickname ==
- Tommy Anderson (ice hockey) (1910–1971), Canadian National Hockey League player
- Howard Blatchford (1912–1943), Canadian World War II flying ace
- Jeff Brantley (born 1963), American baseball player and broadcaster
- Neal Cassady (1926–1968), American Beat poet
- Donald Cerrone (born 1983), American MMA fighter
- Jack Clement (1931–2013), American singer, songwriter and record and film producer
- Herbert Coward (born 1938), American actor
- James Dahlman (1856–1930), American politician
- Leroy Edwards (1914–1971), American basketball player
- Cowboy Morgan Evans (1903–1969), American rodeo cowboy and oil field worker
- Bill Flett (1943–1999), Canadian National Hockey League player
- Curt Gowdy (1919–2006), American sportscaster
- Cowboy Hill (American football) (1899–1966), American football player
- Cowboy Jones (1874–1958), American baseball player
- John McCormack (boxer) (1935–2014), Scottish boxer
- Cowboy Jimmy Moore (1910–1999), American pocket billiards player
- Kevin Neale (1945–2023), Australian rules footballer
- Cowboy Troy (born 1970), American country rapper
- Cowboy Slim Rinehart (1911–1948), American singer and radio broadcaster
- Cowboy Saunders (1928–2006), South African rugby union player
- Cowboy Wheeler (1898–1939), American football player and an original member of the Green Bay Packers
- Byron Wolford (1930–2003), American rodeo cowboy and poker player

== People with the ring name ==
- Cowboy Lang, midget professional wrestler Harry Lang (1950–2007)
- Alex Oliveira (fighter) (born 1988), Brazilian UFC fighter
- Bob Orton Jr. (born 1950), American professional wrestler

== People with the stage name ==
- Cowboy Copas, American country music singer Lloyd Copas (1913–1963)
- Keef Cowboy and Cowboy, stage names of Keith Wiggins (1960–1989), American hip hop artist and member of Grandmaster Flash and the Furious Five

== Other uses ==
- Cowboy Mountain, Washington, United States
- Joe West (umpire) (born 1952), American baseball umpire nicknamed "Cowboy Joe"
- Cowboy (comics), a Marvel Comics character
- Cowboy (sex position), a type anal sex between two men
- Cowboy (cocktail), a Prohibition-era cocktail made with whiskey and cream
- Cowboy pool or just cowboy, a hybrid pool game
- Cowboys (Heroscape), a type of hero in the wargame Heroscape
- Cowboy, a 2014 novel by Finnish writer Reijo Mäki
- Cowboy, a concept pickup by American Motors based on the AMC Hornet

== See also ==
- Cowboy or open chord, in music
- Cowgirl (disambiguation)
