= List of original (pre-war) Martin D-45s =

Smiley Maxedon's 1942 D-45, no. 81578, presently in the C.F. Martin Museum in Nazareth, Pennsylvania

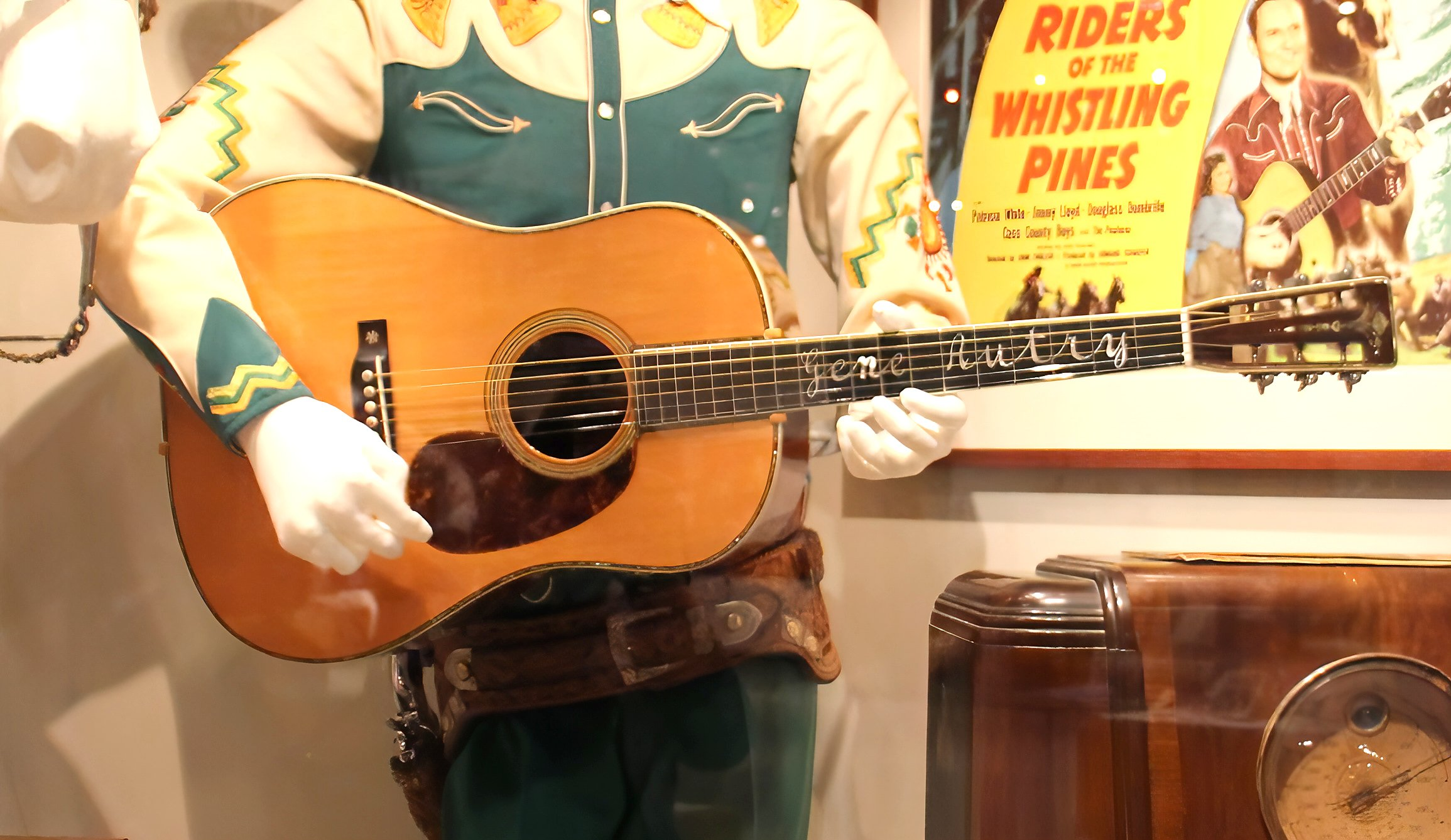
Gene Autry's original 1933 D-45, s/n 53177, photographed at the Autry National Center; one of only three with 12-fret neck (and longer body), all the remainder have 14-fret necks.

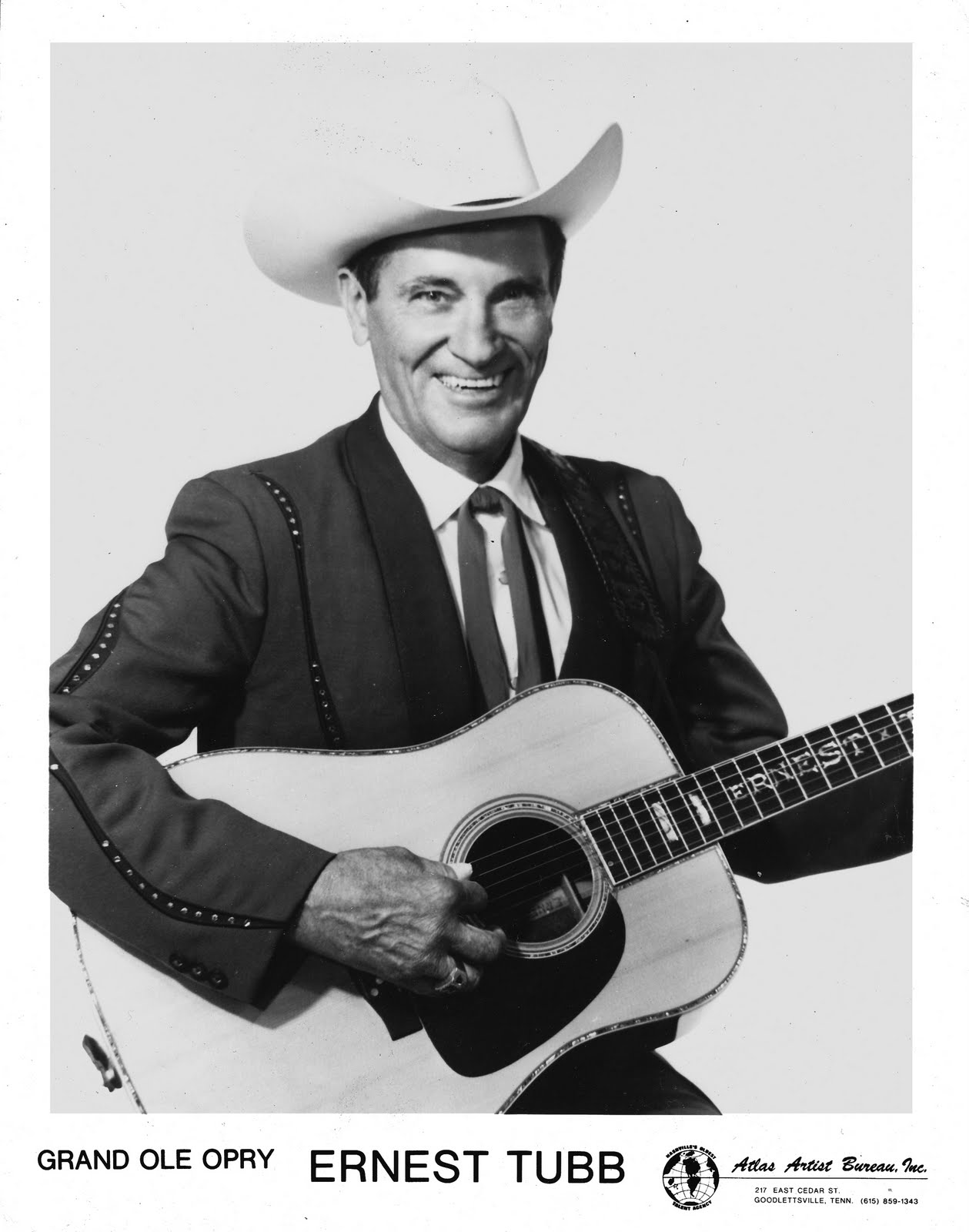
Ernest Tubb with his customized 1938 D-45, s/n 70594. Before Tubb purchased it, this instrument would have had "snowflake" inlays in the fingerboard, replaced with 2 pearl blocks plus "Ernest Tubb" in pearl letters along the fingerboard (also, "Texas Troubadour" in gold paint on the headstock).

This is a list of the 91 original (pre-war (Note: "Pre-war" is a term used by vintage guitar enthusiasts to describe, in particular, Martin guitars made "prior to the functional specification changes of early 1942" (the U.S. entered the second World War in December 1941). Thus, technically, the latest batch(es) of Martin D-45s made through to the end of 1942, from #81578 onwards, enter into the "wartime" period of Martin manufacture, that included specification changes for some instruments, although for convenience all the 91 "original issue" D-45s are generally referred to as "pre-war" in most discussions.)) Martin D-45s made by C. F. Martin & Company in Nazareth, Pennsylvania, between 1933 and 1942. The Martin D-45 is generally recognized to be the most desired, and highly valued, acoustic guitars ever made. In American Guitars: An Illustrated History, author Tom Wheeler describes them as "among American guitar's irreplaceable treasures". It is not known exactly how many still survive, however as information is available in print form or via web information, sale inventories, and so on, it can be collated here.

== Serial numbers and years, with notes as available ==
The listing of serial numbers presented below is from Mike Longworth's book "Martin Guitars - A History", while associated information is from other sources as available, one particularly valuable source being the Martin D-45 Master List by Robert (Bob) Hamilton and Bruce Herrmann. Instruments marked "[E]" are those known to exist according to either information contained herein or a separate version of the Martin D-45 Master List.

s/n	Year	[E]	Description
53177	1933	[E]	Special order for Gene Autry, "Gene Autry" on fingerboard, 12 fret model with slotted head and "torch" inlay on headstock, currently in the Autry National Center in Los Angeles (see illustration at right); photographs and other information available here. This guitar was originally supplied to Mr. Autry at a cost of $210.00, including $10.00 extra for the pearl head and bridge inlay.
56394	1934	[E]	Made for Jackie "Kid" Moore, 12 fret model with solid headstock featuring "torch" inlay. Presently in Hank Risan's Museum of Modern Instruments (MOMI) collection. Featured in "Acoustic Guitar" "Great Acoustics" section, December 1999.
63715	1936	[E]	First 14 fret model (14 frets clear of the body), special wide body (16 1/4 Inches). On loan to, and on display at, the Martin Museum in Nazareth from collector Sten Juhl. Shown in this video from the Martin Museum.
64890	1936	[E]	D-45S Special wide body (16 1/4 Inches). Illustrated on p. 207 of Arlen Roth, "Complete Acoustic Guitar", 1985 (photo provided by Gruhn Guitars, Nashville), also on p. 263 of the hardcover version of George Gruhn/Walter Carter book "Acoustic Guitars and Other Fretted Instruments" where it is credited to "Steve Shaw", therefore potentially included in the collection of the late Steven Kern Shaw (refer "Miscellaneous" section).
65265	1937		2 pick guards according to the D-45 master list; current existence not known
67460	1937	[E]	Third and last 12 fret model, all remainder are 14 frets; the only 12 fret instrument with solid (non slotted) head and vertical "C F Martin" inlay as per 14-fret models. Made for Harold A. Wagler, initials "HAW" in fingerboard. Illustrated on p. 248 of and on page 263 of the hardcover version of George Gruhn/Walter Carter book "Acoustic Guitars and Other Fretted Instruments".
70592	1938	[E]	
70593	1938	[E]	Illustrated in the "Martin Guitar Book", also "The Vintage Guitar Vol. 3"; presently in the collection of Gary Rapoza.
70594	1938	[E]	Previously owned by Ernest Tubb. Has additional rosewood overlay on headstock with "Texas Troubadour" in gold paint, "Ernest Tubb" in pearl lettering plus two non-original hexagon inlays in fingerboard, "THANKS" in large painted white letters (with green shadowing) across the back. Restored by Marty Lanham of the Nashville Guitar Company in 2020.
71039	1938	[E]	Previously owned by Red Smiley, now in the collection of Mac Yasuda, illustrations (from Japanese magazine) here. This instrument has ornamental rhinestones inserted into the head, snowflake inlays have been replaced by more "modern" hexagons (engraved "RED" and "D-45" at the 12th and 19th frets, respectively), also the original D-45 back has been replaced by a later D-28 back at some point. Now in the collection of Mac Yasuda. Illustrated in his book "Rhinestones and Twanging Tones".
71040	1938	[E]	Owned at some point by David Bromberg, many repaired cracks in top. At some time in Japan, illustrations (from Japanese magazine) here. For sale at Gruhn in 2009 for $110,000 (inventory no. AA7972). Illustrated in M. Yasuda's book "Rhinestones and Twanging Tones".
71041	1938	[E]	Known to exist. It is cited as having forward-X bracing, snowflake inlay and being in excellent condition.
71663	1938	[E]	Special order with unique (?, for a D-45) sunburst top, tortoiseshell headstock veneer, F-9 (archtop) style hexagon fingerboard inlays (the latter later adopted as standard on D-45s from 1939 onwards) and additional white stripes on edges of fingerboard (also as per F-9 archtop). The "Teeter Guitar", owned at one time by noted repairman Don Teeter and illustrated on the cover his 1980 book "Acoustic Guitar: Adjustment, Care, Maintenance and Repair Volume II", also featured on the cover of "Frets" magazine, May 1988 and in the "Encore" section of "Guitar Player" magazine, February 1992 and as a foldout on page 49 of the 1st edition of Walter Carter's Martin book. Sold by Lark Street Music in 1987 for $18,000 according to this interview with Buzzy Levine; later in Hank Risan's Museum of Modern Instruments (MOMI) collection. As at 2026, in the collection of well known guitar collector Matt Swanson.
71664	1938	[E]	Previously in Japan, illustrated on pp. 23–24 of the (Japanese) "Martin Vintage Guitar Guide". Now in US.
71665	1938	[E]	"Possibly the last D-45 with snowflake inlays in fretboard", illustrated here. illustrated in "The Vintage Guitar Vol. 3"
72160	1939	[E]	Formerly owned by Ernie Howery, Dave Portman and Jim Rickard; bought by Howery for $200 in the mid-1950s, then by Portman for $720 and a banjo in trade in 1962. This instrument was used by Tony Rice on one track "I Don't Want Your Mandolins Mister" of his 1994 duet CD "Tone Poems" with David Grisman, and is illustrated on the cover of "Acoustic Guitar" magazine, January 1996, reproduced here. Most recently in the collection of the late Steven Kern Shaw, now on display in the collection of instruments bequeathed by him to Belmont University.
72161	1939		
72162	1939		
72460	1939	[E]	D-45S. The 'S' was for a 'special neck' which was narrower than 1 11/16", previously owned by Wilma Lee Cooper. Having been for sale at Gruhn around 1990, in somewhat poor condition. Now extensively restored and refinished by TJ Thompson after 8 years, including addition of a thin layer of wood to the underside of the top to correct previous over-thinning. Formerly in the collection of Mac Yasuda; illustrated in his book "Rhinestones and Twanging Tones". Listed for sale at Carter Vintage Guitars, Nashville, as at March 2020, asking price $145,000.
72740	1939	[E]	Known to exist, repaired by Martin during the period 1966-2001.
72741	1939	[E]	"Mother Maybelle", owned by Stephen Stills; some additional information here.
72742	1939		
73126	1939		
73127	1939	[E]	
73128	1939	[E]	Owned at one time by Johnny Smith. Seen at Gruhn Guitars, January 2013; advertised for sale by Steve Swan Guitars, February 2015, for $150,000, since sold.
73129	1939	[E]	For sale via Gruhn Guitars in 2012, asking price $185,000 (inventory no. AA8729). Purchased by Jim Irsay, CEO/Owner of the Indianapolis Colts, (deceased 2025). Sold by Christie's New York (as a part of the Jim Irsay Collection), March 2026, hammer price $310,000 (final sale price $393,700 including 27% buyer's premium; estimate $250,000–$350,000).
73130	1939	[E]	Previously owned by Mike Longworth in around 1975. Cited as being sold by Gruhn: most likely as illustrated here (archived copy of web page from 2007). As at July 2024, consigned for auction via Heritage Auctions in Dallas, Texas, however failed to sell at that time.
73131	1939	[E]	Now in Japan.
74011	1939	[E]	D-45S Special order for country singer Ken MacKenzie, with singer's name inlaid in the fingerboard, see photos here. Appears (with 11 other prewar D-45s) in a photograph of guitars from the Mac Yasuda collection in "The Vintage Guitar volume 3". Illustrated Mac Yasuda's book "Rhinestones and Twanging Tones". As at September 2025, offered for sale at Carter Vintage Guitars, Nashville, asking price $525,000.
74161	1940	[E]	Previously owned by the well known Martin historian Mike Longworth and was on display in the Martin museum from 1974 to 1995 according to this article prior to being consigned to auction at Christie's in April 1995 (the guitar failed to sell at that time). Subsequently, in a private collection.
74162	1940		
74163	1940	[E]	Single owner till 1987; sold by Gruhn Guitars in 2019, original finish, sale price $335,000. Description on the Gruhn site here (inventory number: AA10792).
74164	1940		
74165	1940	[E]	Previously owned by Marty Stuart, Johnny Cash and Hank Williams, Jr.. Also additional information below, in "Miscellaneous" section; donated by Stuart (along with the rest of his collection) to the Country Music Hall Of Fame in August 2024.
74166	1940	[E]	
75100	1940	[E]	Once owned by Bernie Leadon of Eagles. Now in the collection of Mac Yasuda.
75101	1940	[E]	Sold by Gruhn Guitars in 2012 (inventory number AA6071), illustrated at, see also, the same instrument illustrated with a sold price $165,000 on this web page about the 2012 Dallas International Guitar Festival.
75102	1940	[E]	
75103	1940		
75104	1940	[E]	Known to exist, repaired by Martin during the period 1966-2001; currently in Japan in the collection of the well known popular singer Fukuyama Masaharu.
75105	1940	[E]	Known to exist, seen at Gruhn Guitars. Refinished.
75289	1940	[E]	D-45L (Left hand). In the same family since the 1940s, in the United States. Original finish. Present owner: Gary Rapoza.
75593	1940		
75594	1940	[E]	In the collection of Mac Yasuda, illustrated on the front cover of the "Martin Guitar Book", see reference below
75595	1940	[E]	Nicknamed "Old Red", formerly owned by Grant Boat right. This guitar is presently in the collection of Jonathan Kellerman, and is included (among other guitars from his collection) in an article in "Vintage Guitar", October 2005.
75596	1940	[E]	Illustrated on a Japanese website here, also on pp. 27–28 of the (Japanese) "Martin Vintage Guitar Guide". Currently in the collection of Nakakita Hideki, where it has been nicknamed Asano Yoshinaga after a 16th Century Japanese samurai warrior.
75597	1940		
75598	1940	[E]	Known to exist. Subsequently offered for sale at Gruhn Guitars, Nashville, July 2023, asking price $275,000. Refinished.
77060	1941		
77061	1941		
77062	1941	[E]	Offered for sale in 2025 by Well Strung Guitars, Farmingdale, NY, asking price $419,995.
77063	1941	[E]	Purchased new in 1941, currently in the possession of the original owner's daughter.
77064	1941	[E]	Featured in "The History of the American Guitar" by Tony Bacon (UK edition), see here.
77065	1941	[E]	Previously sold by Elderly Instruments here (archived page from 2004, last advertised price $110,000 (previously $140,000)). Apparently now in Japan, illustrated on pp. 29–30 of the (Japanese) "Martin Vintage Guitar Guide", with incorrect serial number ("77066")
78629	1941	[E]	Surfaced in 2015, for sale at Norman's Rare Guitars; asking price $285,000 (later $250,000 as at November 2015). 2 YouTube videos available here; subsequently appears in the collection of the Songbirds Guitar Museum in Chattanooga, Tennessee, refer this "exhibits" page and virtual museum tour. Subsequently (July 2024) offered for sale by Well Strung Guitars, Farmingdale, NY, asking price $450,000.
78630	1941		
78631	1941	[E]	Listed for sale in Christie's auction, 10 October 2008, pictures here, also again in April 2009 (Sale 2152 Lot 31) with a low estimate ($30,000-$40,000) but did not sell at that time. Listed again for auction at Skinner's, Boston Auction 2892B Lot 23, with same estimated sale price ($30,000-$40,000), as at May 2016., sold for $27,060 including buyer's premium. Finish and several key parts non-original, top significantly thinned and in need of some restoration. Present owner: Gary Rapoza. Subsequently (May 2021) for sale on Reverb, asking price $350,000.; then (August 2021) at Carter Vintage Guitars, asking price $335,000. As at July 2024, offered by Lark Street Music, asking price $250,000, previously $299,000.
78632	1941		
78633	1941		
78634	1941	[E]	Known to exist, seen at a guitar show in 1992. Recently resurfaced and listed for sale in Australia, January 2015, since sold.
78879	1941	[E]	Originally surfaced on eBay in 2008 also again since then for $250,000 (in January 2009). Currently owned by Jacob Bunton
78880	1941		Appraised by Gruhn in 1973 for then owner Ben Speer of the Speer Family gospel group; present whereabouts/continued existence not publicly known.
78881	1941	[E]	Known to exist, repaired by Martin during the period 1966-2001.
78882	1941	[E]	Surfaced in 2012 at the Philadelphia Vintage Guitar Convention, subsequently (2013) auctioned at Heritage Auctions, Dallas, details here, fairly heavily restored though with partially original finish (sold price $110,500). The same instrument was subsequently offered for sale by Carter Vintage Guitars in January 2016, inventory no. GF959, asking price $150,000, later (2025) for sale again through Carter's, asking price $375,000.
78883	1941	[E]	Surfaced in 2018, offered for sale by Gryphon Stringed Instruments, California, asking price $135,000 in May 2018; refinished; since sold (June 2018).
78884	1941		
79583	1941	[E]	Surfaced in 2011 from the family of the original owner, who reportedly played on the Grand Ole Opry radio show several times, but all original and very lightly used; auctioned at Skinner's, Boston (sold price $219,225), subsequently on sale at Rumbleseat Music, CA, and at Carter Vintage Guitars; some additional photos here also various clips on YouTube
79584	1941		
79585	1941	[E]	
79586	1941	[E]	Originally owned by Bob Wills. In the collection of Hank Risan's Museum of Modern Instruments (MOMI) to 2022, subsequently sold to a private collector via Emerald City Guitars, Seattle in 2022; more information and serial number visible via this YouTube video.
79587	1941	[E]	Sold by Bernunzio Uptown Music, New York in 2010–11, details here (asking price $250,000); stated as previously being in the possession of the same owner since the mid-1960s.
79588	1941	[E]	
80740	1942	[E]	In the collection of Mac Yasuda, illustrated in "The Vintage Guitar Vol. 3"
80741	1942	[E]	Known to exist, repaired by Martin during the period 1966-2001.
80742	1942	[E]	In the collection of Mac Yasuda, illustrated in "The Vintage Guitar Vol. 3"
80743	1942	[E]	Owned by Stephen Stills "Darling"; probably the instrument featured played by Stills on the January 1976 cover of "Guitar Player" magazine
80744	1942	[E]	"The best sounding" of 6 vintage D-45s sold by George Gruhn from his personal collection in 1976 to Kentucky musician and repairman Harry Sparks for $7,500 and can be seen in this video interview of Vince Gill, who also owned the instrument for a while and has it on loan as at 2016.
80745	1942	[E]	Surfaced in 2011; purchased from seller by Gary Dick of Gary's Classic Guitars, details and pictures available here.
81242	1942	[E]	D-45S Made for Austin Woods, "Austin" on fingerboard, oversize pickguard; currently on display at the Country Music Hall of Fame, Nashville. Illustrated on p. 248 of, also reproduced here. The last D-45 with a steel T-bar in the neck; the twelve D-45s that followed all have the ebony neck reinforcement.
81578	1942	[E]	Originally owned and played by Smiley Maxedon. Sold by Elderly Instruments in 2000 (archived description here, listed price $160,000); re-sold in 2007 and purchased for the C.F. Martin Museum at Nazareth, PA, for around $270,000 also shown here; shown by Chris Martin in this YouTube video; illustrated on p. 47 of Jim Washburn's 2016 "Martin Archives" book. "Martin database" entry here
81579	1942	[E]	Known to exist, repaired by Martin during the period 1966-2001.
81580	1942	[E]	Known to exist, repaired by Martin during the period 1966–2001. Originally owned by Wiley Jordan, whose band Wiley Jordan and the Sons of the South was popular in the 1940s and 1950s. Offered for sale by The Music Emporium, June 2026, asking price $425,000.
81581	1942		
81582	1942		
81583	1942	[E]	Formerly owned by Alice Gerrard, pictured here and on some of her album covers; subsequently by luthier and musician Wayne Henderson. Has oversize pickguard.
82567	1942		
82568	1942	[E]	Illustrated here.
82569	1942	[E]	Previously belonged to Wilma Lee Cooper, sold by Gruhn (twice: last offered for $195,000 in August 2016, inventory no. AA9807) and presently in the possession of country/folk/Americana performer Gillian Welch; see "Miscellaneous" section for more information in this and Wilma Lee Cooper's other original D-45.
82570	1942	[E]	Known to exist, seen at North Carolina guitar show circa 1991.
82571	1942	[E]	Originally owned and played by Judge Lloyd Rea of Judge Lloyd Rea and the Oregon Trailblazer. Recent illustration here.
82572	1942	[E]	Last "original series" D-45 made, subject of an article in "Great Acoustics" section of "Acoustic Guitar" magazine, May 2000, facsimile available here. Most recently in the collection of the late Steven Kern Shaw, now on display in the collection of instruments bequeathed by him to Belmont University.

== Miscellaneous ==
George Gruhn, the well known Nashville instrument dealer talks in this 2010 interview with "Guitar International" magazine about his one time considerable collection of vintage style 45 Martin instruments including 6 pre-war D-45s. This collection was sold in 1976 to finance the purchase of his house and the building in which his business was located. The "best sounding" (1942) D-45, no 80744 was sold to Kentucky musician and repairman Harry Sparks for $7,500, and has since been sighted in the hands of Vince Gill (see above section for that serial no.).

The well known U.S.-based Japanese collector Mac Yasuda has an extensive collection of American vintage guitars including 14 original D-45s according to this report among others, some of which are detailed in the section above. In 2001 he published "The Vintage Guitar Vol. 3" which includes one photo of 12 D-45s as well as individual photos of 4 instruments. In 2010 he published another illustrated book in Japan, the "Martin Guitar Book" as detailed here, which shows two D-45s (one pre-war s/n 75594, one recent) on the front cover. Among his collection is a 1940 (or 1941) D-45 previously owned by Bernie Leadon, another is s/n 74011 originally custom built for Ken MacKenzie (see relevant entry in main numeric section above); another is reportedly an instrument previously owned and played by Charlie Monroe which was purchased new in 1942. Mr Yasuda is shown holding one of his D-45s, with a portion of his collection behind, in this photograph.

The late Steven Kern Shaw, son of well known clarinetist Artie Shaw and grandson of Broadway composer Jerome Kern, has donated his substantial collection of iconic 20th century American-made instruments - including historic Gibson mandolins and Martin guitars - to Belmont University in Nashville as of November 2016, where they went on display in a museum opened in Spring 2017. This collection includes four pre-war Martin D-45s according to this press release, which also shows George Gruhn holding one of the pre-war D-45s (a 1939 instrument); the collection includes #82572, the last pre-war D-45 made, and also #72160 as well.

Marty Stuart currently owns and performs with a 1940 D-45 (#74165) which he obtained from Johnny Cash. The instrument has a pearl patch in the front (engraved "CASH") where some spruce was once damaged (example photos here and here). Tut Taylor states that he originally acquired the guitar and sold it to Hank Williams, Jr, who later traded it to Johnny Cash. A recent article on Stuart and his collection in "Guitar Aficionado" magazine here discusses this instrument in some depth.

At some point, Gruhn Guitars sold 2 Martin D-45s previously belonging to Wilma Lee Cooper, dated 1938 (this one with snowflake inlays and an oversize pickguard, previously owned by Lee Moore, Gruhn inventory number AA6291, serial number not known) and 1942 (s/n 82569, Gruhn inventory number AA6290; the latter is mis-labelled a D-43 on the Gruhn site). The guitars are illustrated here, including this picture of Wilma Lee with the 1938 guitar; at that time the 1942 D-45 had a sale price of $100,000. More recently, the 1942 instrument was again sold by Gruhn in 2016 (inventory no. AA9087, asking price $195,000) and is now owned by performer and songwriter Gillian Welch. This picture shows Gillian on stage with this guitar. Wilma Lee was also an owner of #72460 (1939), refer main list.

Actor and some time guitarist Steven Seagal possesses a pre-war D-45 with snowflake inlays (circa 1938) according to a 2006 interview with "Vintage Guitar" magazine reproduced here; the same guitar is shown briefly in this video.

This video of the Songbirds Guitar Museum in Chattanooga includes footage of 2 pre-war Martin D-45s in that collection: one is no. 78629 (1941) as mentioned in the main list, the date and serial number of the other is not known at this time.

A 1939 D-45 (serial number not stated) is illustrated and discussed by George Gruhn in the July 2004 issue of "Vintage Guitar" magazine.

A 1940 D-45 (serial number not stated) is presently in Hank Risan's Museum of Modern Instruments (MOMI) collection. This collection also formerly housed a 1941 D-45 originally owned by Bob Wills, #79586, refer above section.

A 1940 D-45 (serial number not stated) was being offered for sale by Gruhn Guitars in 2008/9 (inventory no. AA7977), asking price unknown. Another 1940 D-45 (serial number not stated), refinished, is on sale at Gruhn for $195,000 as at June 2015 (inventory no. AA9506).

A 1940 D-45 (serial number not stated) in superb condition, photographed in the UK is illustrated in this Getty Images entry; the same image is used as an example of a 1940 D-45 on p. 33 of "The Ultimate Guitar Sourcebook" by Tony Bacon.

U.S. Country artist Doyle Dykes owns a 1940 D-45 (serial number not stated), pictured in the May 2020 issue of Vintage Guitar magazine. According to the article, at one point in the 1950s this instrument had to be returned to the Martin factory for a replacement top, and was fitted with a "plain", D-28 style top lacking the distinctive D-45 abalone trim. The guitar was originally owned by Dykes' uncle Doyle "Smitty" Smith, a professional guitarist in Washington, D.C., and came into Dykes' possession on his uncle's death; in 1988 Dykes gifted the instrument to country artist Roy Clark, and on the latter's death in 2018, his widow returned the instrument to Dykes. A photograph of this instrument in the hands of its original owner, before its top replacement, is included in the magazine article, and shows it to have originally been fitted with an unusual, large and asymmetrical double pickguard. Several samples of Doyle playing this instrument are available on YouTube, example here.

A 1941 D-45 (serial number not stated), refinished with "multiple professionally repaired top cracks" and other issues was being offered for sale by Gruhn Guitars in 2007, inventory no. AA7628, asking price $85,000.

A 1942 D-45, in superb condition (serial number not stated), was featured in "Vintage Guitar" magazine, May 2009, copy available here.

A 1942 D-45 (serial number not stated, peghead repair by Dan Erlewine) was being offered for sale by Gruhn Guitars in 2007, asking price $175,000, inventory no. AA7596.

An article entitled "Martin D-45: A Chronicle of the Jewelled Dreadnought" appeared in the Japanese magazine "Acoustic Guitar Magazine", volume 4, Spring 2000 (Rittor Music, 2000)

Other 1930s-1960s country / bluegrass performers who have been pictured with their D-45s include Gene Autry (owner of the first D-45 guitar), Jackie "Kid" Moore, Jimmy Martin, Charlie Monroe, Skeeter Bonn, Toby Stroud, Ken MacKenzie, Smiley Maxedon (see information above for #81578), Ernest Tubb, Red Allen (whose D-45 was apparently loaned to him by his group's bass player, Tom Morgan), and Nolan "Cowboy Slim" Rinehart.

== Original list price and present value ==
The D-45 was available only by special order until the late 1930s, when a flyer listed it as available as part of the regular Martin dreadnaught line for the price of $225, as compared with $75 for a D-18 and $115 for a D-28 (the list price on Gene Autry's initial 1933 order was $200, plus an additional $10 for the custom pearl inlay on the headstock and the bridge). When last available new from the Martin Guitar Company, the 1942 D-45 retailed at $250, equivalent to approximately $3,630 in 2014 dollars as a straight conversion, however bearing in mind average incomes of the time, could be construed as between $6,700 and $11,100 in today's terms (same reference, calculated as labor value/income value). In accordance with its gradual acceptance as possibly the finest production steel-string acoustic guitar ever made, the value of an all original, pre-war Martin D45 has gone up considerably over the intervening 70+ years. In a Vintage Guitar Price Survey published by "Frets" magazine in May 1988, a 1939 D-45 in mint condition was estimated at average dealer price $15,000 (range $6,000-$22,000) and a 1942 D-45 (similar) at $13,000 (range $6,000-$21,000). By 2002 the Vintage Guitar Price Guide listed prices of up to $200,000 for 1936–1937 D-45s and up to $150,000 for 1940–1942 models. In the 2026 Vintage Guitar Price Guide the same models were quoted as up to $675,000 for 1936–1937 D-45s and up to $550,000 for 1940–1942 models.
