= Martin D-45 =

Acoustic guitar

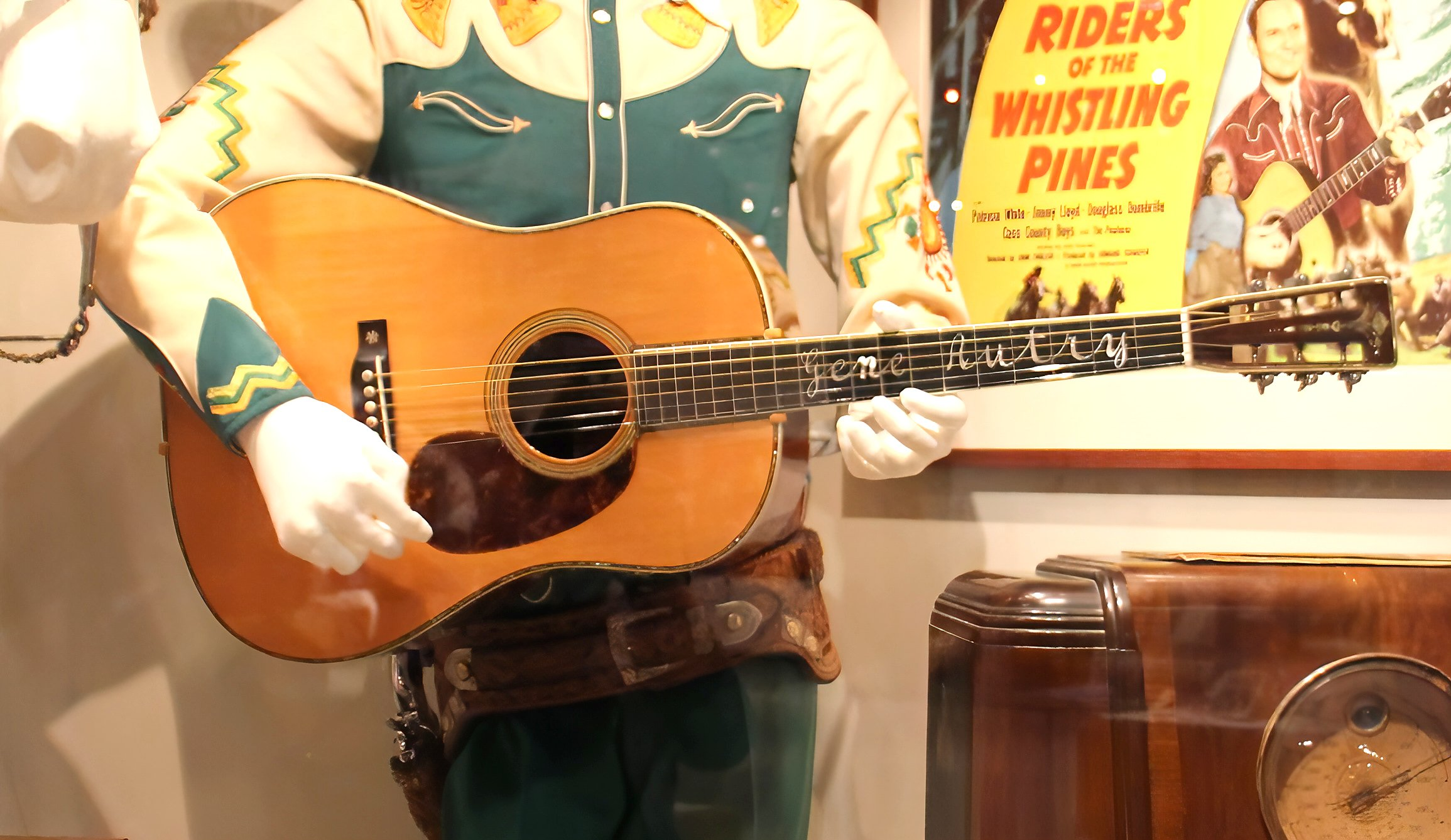
- Gene Autry's original 1933 D-45, s/n 53177, photographed at the Autry National Center; one of only three pre-war D-45s with 12-fret neck (and longer body), all the remainder have 14-fret necks.
- Manufacturer: C. F. Martin & Company
- Period: 1933–1942, 1968–present

Construction
- Body type: Square-shoulder dreadnought
- Neck joint: Dovetail

Woods
- Body: Sitka Spruce or Adirondack top Rosewood back and sides
- Neck: Mahogany
- Fretboard: Ebony

Hardware
- Bridge: Ebony
- Pickup: Optional L.R.Baggs Element Active

Colors available
- Natural

The Martin D-45 is a steel-string acoustic guitar model made by C. F. Martin & Company. The model was manufactured from 1933 to 1942, and in a second production series since 1968. Martin originally made the guitar's sides and backs of Brazilian rosewood. Martins are ranked among the highest-quality, as well as among the most expensive guitars, and the D-45, regarded as one of the first "luxury guitars", was listed in 2011 as the most valuable production-model guitar.

== History ==
=== First series, 1933-1942 ===
The first D-45 was a dreadnought guitar based on the Martin D-28 with luxury ornamentation (the "45" designation), made especially for Gene Autry who, in 1933, ordered "the biggest, fanciest Martin he could." This guitar is now encased in glass in the Gene Autry Museum of the American West in Los Angeles, California. The next year, Martin made one for Jackie "Kid" Moore, a "12-year-old singing cowboy from Milwaukee, Wisconsin." These first two had a 12-fret neck; most others (except for the 6th, made in 1937) made afterward had a 14-fret neck. Two more were made in 1936 and two again in 1937; the D-45 wasn't catalogued until 1938. Other versions included a D-45S (with a special neck, 1939) and a D-45L (left handed, 1940). The D-45 was the top model of the dreadnought line, which also included the D-28 and D-18 models, priced much lower.

In 1942, as a result of World War II, Martin officially ceased production of the D-45 (as well as other Martin models such as the archtops). This first series of D-45's consisted of only 91 instruments.

=== Second series, from 1968 ===
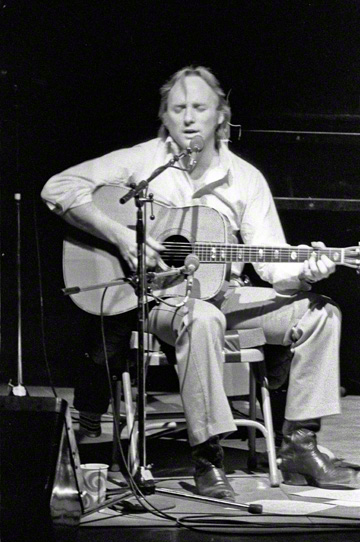
Stephen Stills, 1978 with a D-45 guitar

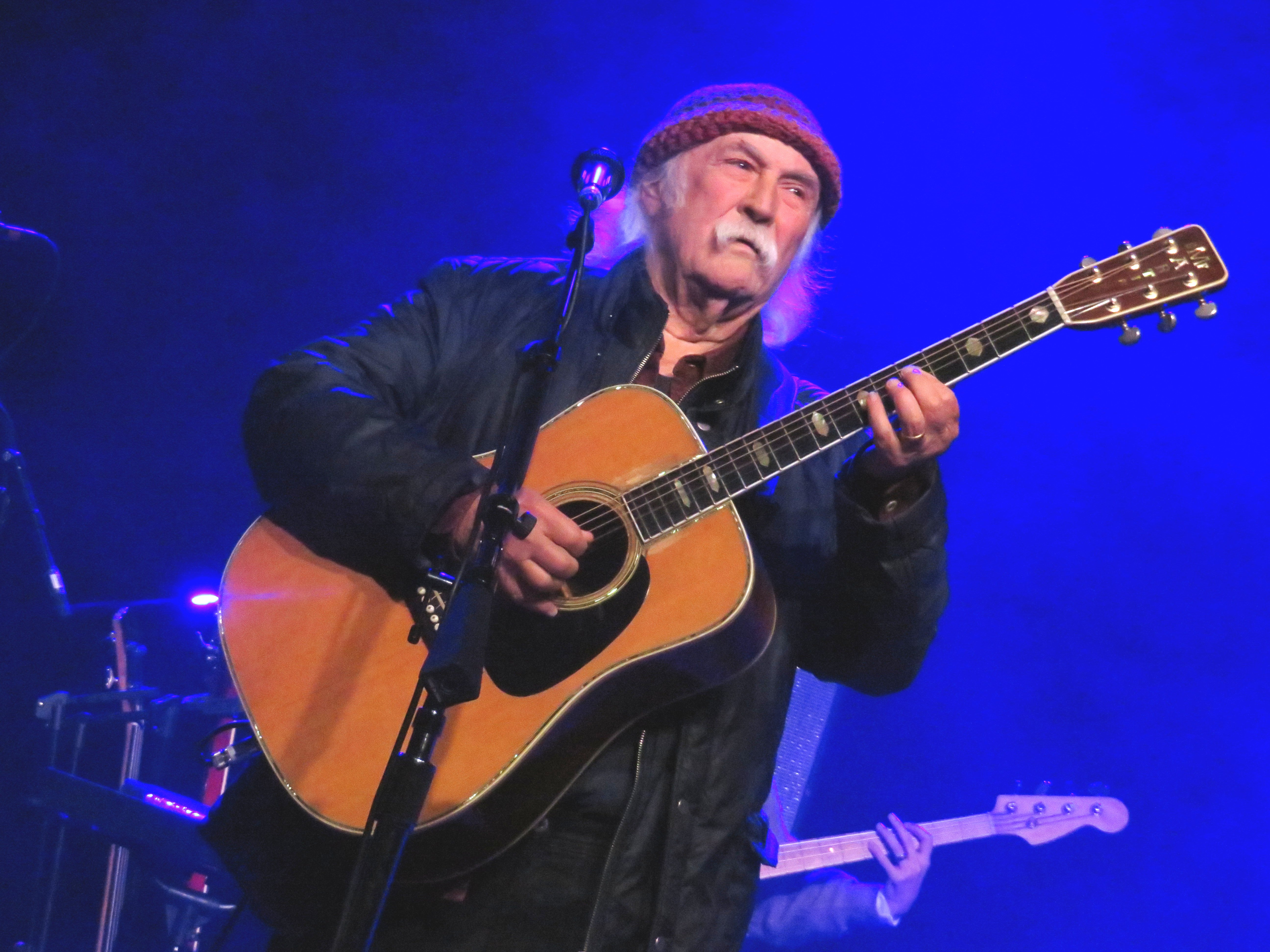
David Crosby with his well travelled, second series Martin D-45, live in Belgium, 2018

The luxurious D-45 resembled the less ornate D-28 model enough to entice entrepreneurial guitar builders and craftsmen to modify the latter to look like the former by adding a pearl border and changing the stamps on the neck block, so they could sell them as the more expensive model. One of those craftsmen was Mike Longworth, a banjo player from Tennessee, who Martin hired specifically to bring the D-45 back. The new D-45, released in 1968, cost $1,200 and was the most expensive flat-top steel-string guitar made in the United States at the time. By 1969, Martin sold twice as many D-45s as during the entire 1933–1942 run; customers included David Crosby and Jimi Hendrix. In 1971, a 12-string model was made, and in 1973, another one.

Longworth also designed a more affordable model, the D-41, making sure that the pearl inlays were done in such a way that the guitar could not be modified to look like a D-45. Since 1968, Martin has produced a number of special versions, including the C.F. Martin Sr. Commemorative D-45 (200 guitars in 1996) and the C.F. Martin Sr. Deluxe D-45 (91 guitars in 1996).

==== Post-1968 models, selection ====
- D-45S (with 12-fret neck and slotted peghead, similar to 1936 models, 1969–1993)
- SD12-45 (12-string, two made in 1971 and 1973)
- D-45LE (with hexagonal outlines, 1987)
- D-45 Deluxe (with upgraded binding, inlays, etc., 1993)
- D-45 Gene Autry (12-fret neck, "Gene Autry" on fingerboard, 1994)
- D-45SS (Stephen Stills signature model, based on Stills' 1939 model, 1999)
- D-45 Celtic Knot
- D-45 Golden Era
- D-45 Authentic

== Value ==
Models produced between 1933 and 1942 (also referred to as "pre-war Martins") are among the most expensive production-model guitars ever made. A listing for $135,000 was noted in a 2005 publication, and in 2011, a Vintage Guitar ranking of valuable guitars saw the D-45 (models made between 1936 and 1942) in first place, worth between $250,000 and $400,000. George Gruhn remarked that pre-war D-45s fetch "more than 20 times as much as a recent issue D-45, even though there is relatively little difference in design."

== Notable owners ==
- David Crosby, who owns three of these—of them at least two are late '60s models.
- Marty Stuart owns a D-45 previously owned by Hank Williams, Jr. who traded it to Johnny Cash, who gave it to Stuart (claims that this guitar was once owned by Hank Williams, Sr. are refuted in that source).
- Stephen Stills owns a 1939 D-45
- Travis Tritt owns a custom D-45
- Neil Young's D-45 is his "principal acoustic guitar", on which he wrote many songs including "Old Man"
- Gabor Szabo played a D-45 as his primary instrument.
- James Taylor owns a custom D-45
- John Mayer owns a D-45 and Martin makes a custom John Mayer D-45
- Roger Waters owns a D-45 standard

== See also ==
- List of original (pre-war) Martin D-45s
