= The Jackeroo =

1937 Australian radio play by Richard Barry

- Genre: drama play
- Running time: 60 mins
- Country of origin: Australia
- Language: English
- Written by: Richard Barry

The Jackeroo is a 1937 Australian radio play by Richard Barry.

It was written for a radio play competition held by a Western Australian newspaper, The Broadcaster. The play was considered too long to qualify for a prize, but the judges recommended it for production. It was presented in Western Australia and purchased by the Australian Broadcasting Commission for broadcast across the nation in January 1938.

Barry died shortly after writing the play (it was his first radio play).

The play was presented as part of ABC's Drama Week Festival in 1938, partly due to request, partly as a tribute to Barry.

It was recorded again in 1939, 1942, 1946 and 1952.

Reviewing a 1942 production, Wireless Weekly said "Anyone who listened to" the play "without realising its satirical import must have been at a loss to discover the merit of the play... The plot of “The Jackeroo” is pure farce, and, with the exception of Molly Deane, the reporter... all the characters are burlesque of stock Australian literary types. Richard Barry has touched off the absurdities of such characters quite neatly, and with a certain amount of sly wit."

== Premise ==
A young Englishman comes to Australia.
