= Cowboy (cocktail) =

Creamy cocktail

The Cowboy is a Prohibition era cocktail made with Scotch and cream. It's been described as a "terrible drink" by Paul Dickson, added to later editions of Patrick Gavin Duffy's book The Standard Bartenders Guide. It also appears in The Savoy Cocktail Book by Harry Craddock. When dark rum is added, it's called a "Midnight Cowboy". It's shaken with ice and served in a cocktail glass.
