= Cowgirl (restaurant) =

American restaurant

- Interactive map of Cowgirl

Restaurant information
- Established: 1989
- Owner: Sherry Delamarter
- Food type: Texas fare
- Location: 519 Hudson Street, New York City, New York, 10014, United States
- Coordinates: 40°44′02″N 74°00′23″W
- Website: cowgirlnyc.com

Cowgirl, or Cowgirl NYC, formerly known as the Cowgirl Hall of Fame, is a lesbian restaurant located at 519 Hudson Street in the West Village of New York City. It was founded in 1989.

== History ==
Waco, Texas native Sherry Delamarter founded Cowgirl as Cowgirl Hall of Fame in 1989. Looking for work as independent TV producer, Delamarter ended up in the New York restaurant business when the owners of Cottonwood Cafe offered to make her a partner in their new venture, Tortilla Flats. Its success led to an invitation to cater an induction ceremony at the National Cowgirl Hall of Fame in Hereford, Texas. Delamarter, who had grown up steeped in culture of the American West, saw it as inspiration to open a restaurant of the same name, which she envisioned would tie the East Coast into western culture and the role of women in the development of the west. Thus she decorated her new space with Texas memorabilia such as longhorn skulls, guitars, saddles, and barbed wire and placed family recipes on the menu such as Frito pie, black-eyed peas salsa, and collard greens, as well as a margarita formulation.

== Menu ==
Menu items include nachos, quesadillas, fried okra, baby back ribs, corn dogs, catfish fingers, crab cakes, salads, chicken-fried steak, macaroni and cheese, grilled shrimp, burgers, chili, pecan pie, and apple crumb pie.

== See also ==
- LGBTQ culture in New York City
