= Cowgirl (disambiguation) =

A cowgirl is the female equivalent of a cowboy.

Cowgirl or Cowgirls may also refer to:

== Arts and entertainment ==
- Cowgirl (album), a 2006 album by Lynn Anderson
- "Cowgirl" (Parmalee song), 2025
- "Cowgirl" (Shaboozey song), 2026
- "Cowgirl" (Underworld song), 1994
- "Cowgirls" (song), by Morgan Wallen featuring Ernest
- "Cowgirls", a 2004 song by Kerry Harvick from the unreleased album Cowgirls
- "Cowgirl", a 2020 song by Nice Horse
- Cowgirl, a German film starring Alexandra Maria Lara
- Cowgirl, a short film featuring Sandra Oh
- Cowgirl (film), a 2026 Spanish romantic comedy-drama
- Jillian "Cowgirl" Pearlman, a character in the Green Lantern comics featuring Hal Jordan
- Cowgirl, a character in the comic book mini-series Ultra
- "Cowgirl", a 2023 song by Nicki Minaj featuring Lourdiz from Pink Friday 2

== Sports ==
- Hardin-Simmons Cowgirls, the women's athletic teams of Hardin-Simmons University, a private Baptist university in Abilene, Texas
- McNeese State Cowgirls, the women's athletic teams of McNeese State University, Lake Charles, Louisiana
- Oklahoma State Cowgirls, the women's athletic teams of Oklahoma State University–Stillwater
  - Cowgirl Stadium, a softball facility
- Wyoming Cowgirls, the women's athletic teams of the University of Wyoming
- A derisive nickname for the Dallas Cowboys, used by rival fans

== Other uses ==
- Cowgirl (sex position), another name for the "woman on top" position
- Cowgirl (restaurant), a restaurant in New York, U.S.
- Cowgirl Creamery, an artisanal cheese company in California, U.S.
