= Field hockey in Australia =

Field Hockey in Australia
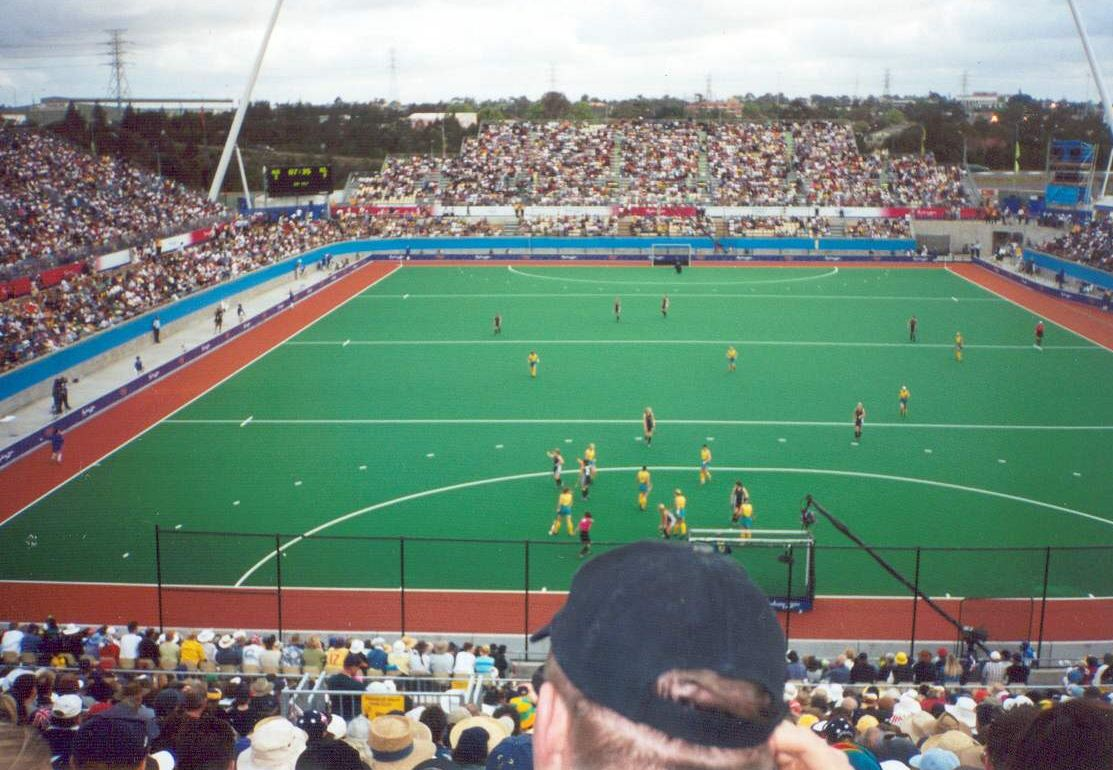
- The Hockeyroos playing at the 2000 Olympics
- Country: Australia
- Governing body: Hockey Australia
- National teams: Kookaburras (Men) Hockeyroos (Women)
- First played: Late 1800s
- Registered players: 162,176

National competitions
- Hockey One; InterVarsity Hockey

International competitions
- Men's FIH Pro League; Women's FIH Pro League; Men's FIH Hockey World Cup; Women's FIH Hockey World Cup; Men's Oceania Cup; Women's Oceania Cup

Field hockey is a moderately popular sport in Australia. It is usually referred to as simply "hockey" and is played in winter, with a season typically starting in March and April. The national governing body, Hockey Australia has 162,176 registered players as of 2020, with a 48% to 52% split of male to female players. Australia is home to two of the best national hockey teams in the world, with both the men and the women having won the Olympics, Commonwealth Games and World Cup one or more times.

== History ==
=== The beginnings of Australian hockey ===
The British navy are often credited as being the first to bring hockey into Australia. In the late 1800s, Australia didn't have a navy and relied on the British to defend their coastlines, this meant that many British games were brought in by the military personnel who were stationed there, one of them being hockey.

=== The AWHA ===
The foundation of the Australian Women's Hockey Association (AWHA) in 1910, led to the rapid growth of women's hockey all over Australia. It was linked closely to the All England Women's Hockey Association, with whom the first Australian women's national team played their first match against in 1914, in addition to their first overseas test in 1930. In 1927, the AWHA became a founding member of the International Federation of Women's Hockey Associations, alongside Denmark, England, Ireland, Scotland, South Africa, the United States and Wales, which in 1982 merged with the International Hockey Federation.

=== The AHA ===
In 1925, the Australian Hockey Association (AHA) was founded.

== Hockey One ==
Since 2019, the national level of competition is Hockey One. Prior to this, it was the Australian Hockey League, which was made from the former Men's and Women's National Hockey League in 1991.

Hockey One is a small league, with only a single men's team and a single women's team from each of the eight states and territories, but it produces excellent results, when measured by the performance of the national squad.

== Kookaburras ==
The Kookaburras, the men's national team have won 1 gold, 4 silver and 5 bronze at the Olympics, as well as 10 World Hockey Cup medals, 6 Commonwealth Games gold medals, 30 Hockey Champions Trophy medals, and one Men's FIH Pro League championship.

== Hockeyroos ==
The Hockeyroos, the women's national team, have won 3 gold Olympic medals in 2000, 1996 and 1988; as well as 4 world cup medals, 2 gold at the Commonwealth games, and 11 champions trophy medals.
