= Cowboy Slim Rinehart =

American singer-songwriter

Cowboy Slim Rinehart (born Nolan Alfred Rinehart; March 11, 1911, in Comanche County, Texas – October 28, 1948, in Michigan), was an American singer.

He was among the first of the "Singing cowboys" of the 1930s and 1940s (whose ranks included Jimmie Rodgers, Gene Autry, and Roy Rogers among others), and gained notoriety and national recognition as a broadcaster and singer on the infamous border radio station XEG during that time period. Rinehart was and is regarded among many as the original "King of Border Radio", preceding Dallas "Nevada Slim" Turner, and "Wolfman Jack", who were also famous for broadcasting from these stations." "Border Radio", also called "Border Blasters" were names applied to several super powered radio stations that broadcast out of Mexico, and therefore, were not regulated by the U.S. broadcasting laws. They were extreme media powerhouses from the 1930s through the 1970s. These stations had towers so powerful that they were capable of transmitting their signals to a very large portion of the United States. Rinehart had his own radio program on XEG where he would sing and play guitar, as well as make infamous Border Radio product pitches for various items. The original "cowboy's sweetheart", Patsy Montana, was often featured on the program with him.

Cowboy Slim Rinehart had a notable influence on many future musician's careers. In addition to having an influence on Big Bill Lister and others, Rinehart helped shape Ernest Tubb's career. After Tubb signed onto Decca Records, he tried in vain to get Rinehart to do the same. Rinehart was wary of the recording industry, and feared a record deal would hurt his music book sales through XEG.

During the 1940s, his persona had become notorious enough that Hollywood studios approached him to be featured in early singing cowboy westerns, but he vehemenently declined the proposals after he was told he would have to change his surname to something less "German sounding". Rinehart had very good potential for a solid and legendary career in the country music scene, but he was killed in a car accident while on the way to finally record his first commercial record.

Although the world has no commercial recordings available of Cowboy Slim Rinehart, recorded tapes of his radio program on XEG are still widely available through collectors and traders, and several of his songs can be found on country music compilation albums.

Rinehart was inducted into the Texas Country Music Hall of Fame in October 1996, in recognition of his being a pioneer of the Texas music scene.
