= Jackaroo =

Young trainee on an Australian cattle or sheep station

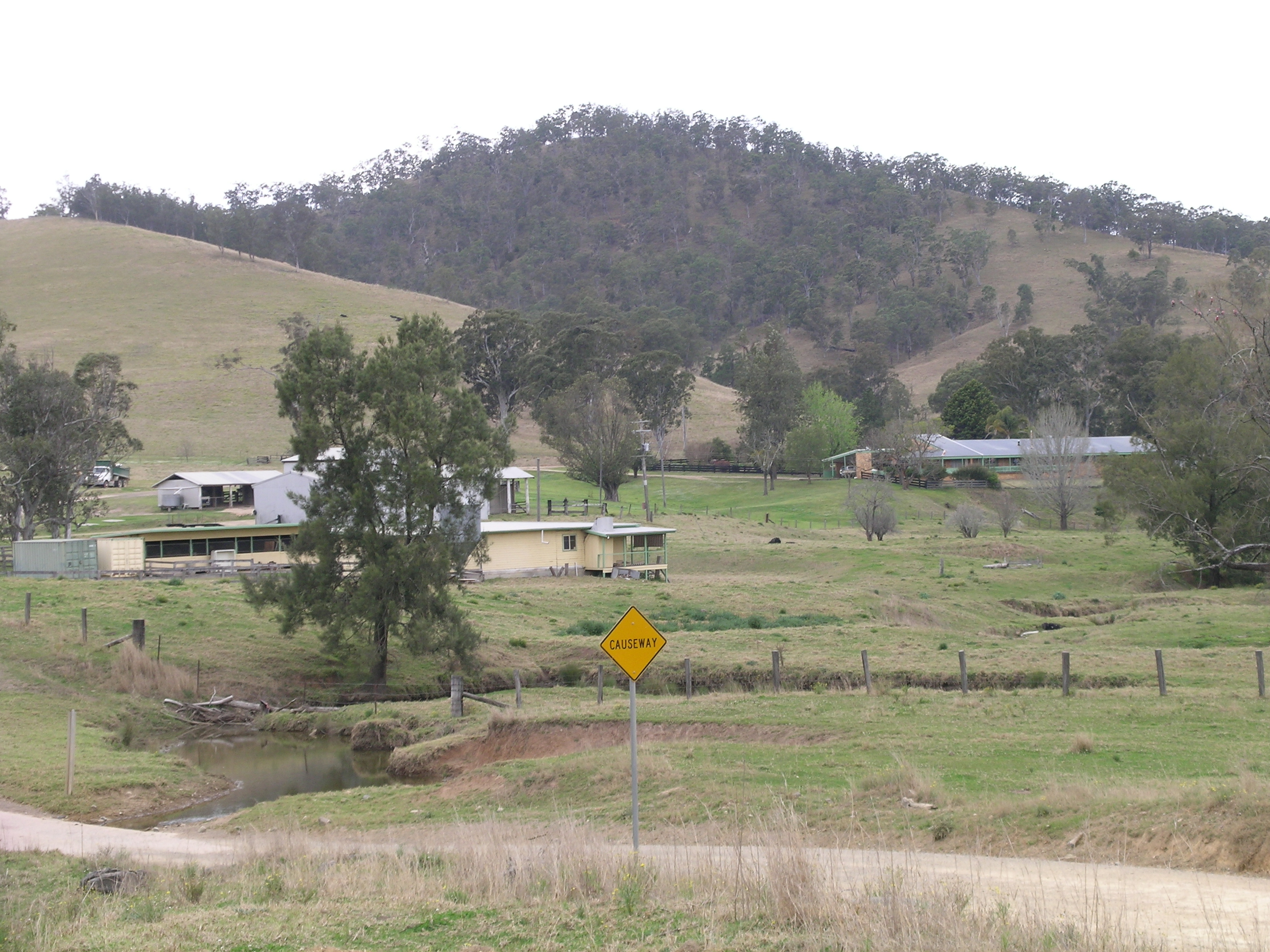
A cattle station in northern New South Wales, where a jackaroo could be working

A jackaroo or jackeroo is a young man (feminine equivalent jillaroo or jilleroo) working on a sheep or cattle station to gain practical experience in the skills needed to become an owner, overseer, manager, etc. The word originated in Queensland, Australia, in the 19th century and is still in use in Australia in the 21st century. The Nuttall Encyclopedia (1909, 1920) defines the term as "name given in Australia to a green-horn from England inexperienced in bush life".

== Etymology ==
=== Jackaroo ===
The word jackaroo, also formerly spelled jackeroo, has been used in Australia since at least the mid 19th century. Its use continues into the 21st century. The origin of the word is unknown, but its first documented use was in Queensland. Several possibilities have been suggested:

- An 1895 suggestion was for an origin from an Aboriginal word for a pied currawong, a garrulous bird, which the strange-sounding language of the white settlers reminded them of. Meston explained his position in a newspaper in 1919.
- By 1925, it was said that the term originated from the fact that "one of the earliest [...] was named 'Jack Carew'."
- 'Jack of all Trades in Australia' (Jack + kangaroo) has popular support. The Brisbane Courier newspaper of Queensland, on 5 July 1929, stated in answer to a question from a reader 'POMMY' of Toowong:
  A jackaroo (sometimes spelt jackeroo) Is a young man learning experience on a pastoral property. (2) In the English language 'Jack' is compounded with a lot of words, and in the early pastoral days it was compounded with the "roo" in kangaroo to indicate, perhaps, the aimless rushing about of the inexperienced station cadet.
- The Encyclopaedia of Australia stated in 1968 that it is "most probably a coined Australian-sounding word based on a [person] 'Jacky Raw'". Jackaroos (Jacky + Raw) were often young men from Britain or from city backgrounds in Australia, which would explain the pejorative use of 'raw' in the sense of 'inexperienced'. This term is attested as early as 1906, especially when used of immigrants.
- Arguably the most authoritative voice on Australian English was that of the Australian National Dictionary Centre of the Research School of the Humanities at the Australian National University, which provides for Oxford University Press their Australian dictionaries. In 2010, the Centre made no final judgment on the origin of the term, but raised the possibility that 'jackeroo' is derived from an Aboriginal word for 'stranger' rather than for a 'pied crow shrike'.
- The spellings jackaroo and jackeroo were both used from about 1880 to at least 1981. In 2010, the more commonly used spelling was 'jackaroo'. However, between the years 1970 and 1981, a sample of Australian newspapers referred to 'jackeroo' 18 times and 'jackaroo' 29 times.

=== Jillaroo ===
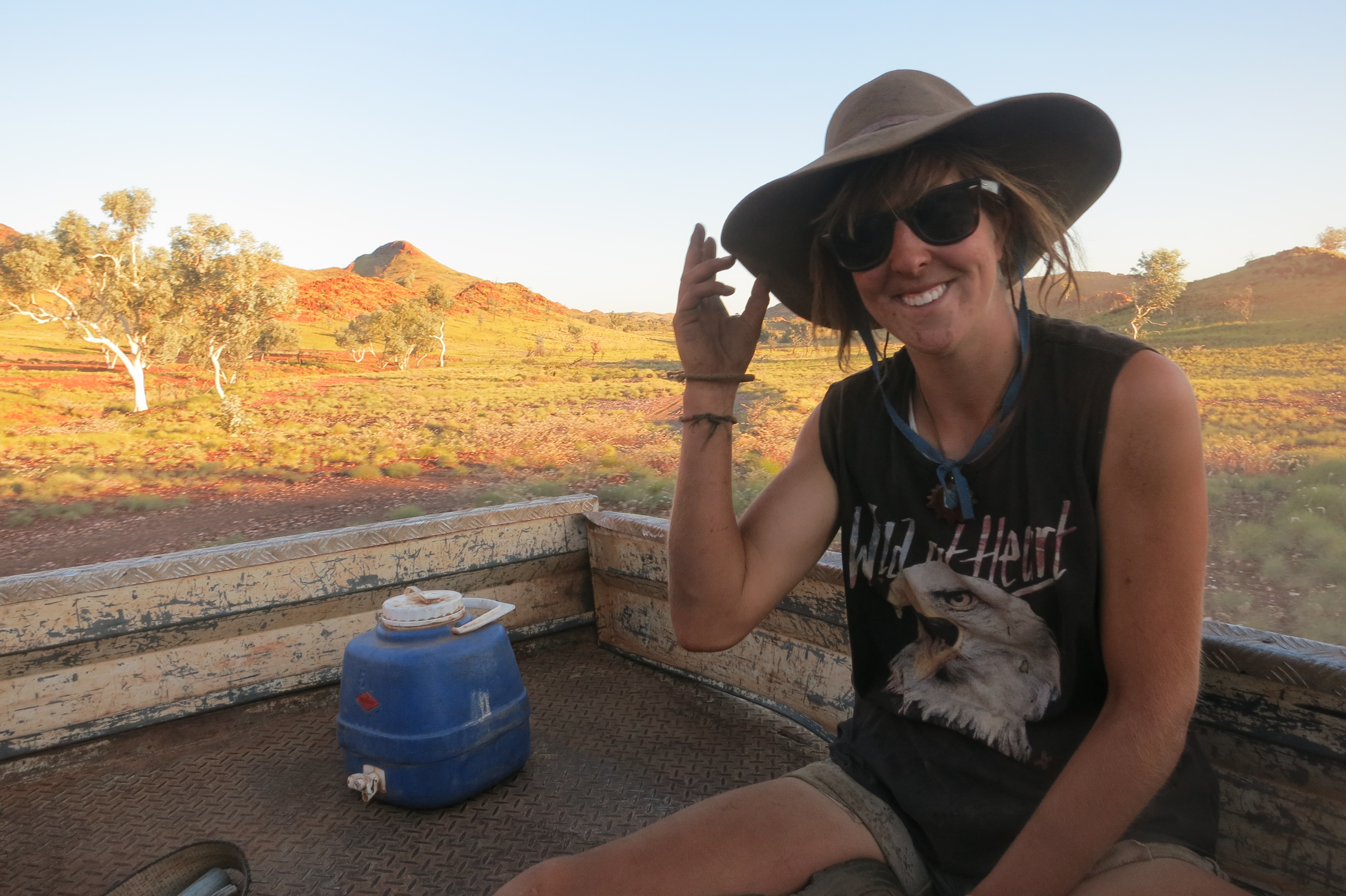
A jillaroo working in the Pilbara, 2015

The word jillaroo for a female landworker was coined in the Second World War and has persisted into the 21st century. During the war, it was necessary for women to take on all the occupations followed traditionally only by men. Jack and Jill is a widely known nursery rhyme, and suggests the derivation of Jillaroo from Jackaroo.

== History ==
=== 19th century ===
An early reference to jackaroos can be found in Tibb's popular song book, published between 1800 and 1899. This book begins by describing itself as: "Containing the latest hits on Busy in town, Australia's carsman, The Chinese and federation, Squatters' defeat, Australia's happy land, The Jackaroo, &c., &c.,"

In 1867, Temple Bar magazine featured an essay, "Reminiscences of Bush Life in Queensland," in which the anonymous author calls his past self a "Jackaroo" due to his inexperience.

In 1878, 'Ironbark' stated "Young gentlemen getting their 'colonial experience' in the bush are called 'jackeroos' by the station-hands. The term is seldom heard except in the remote 'back-blocks' of the interior."

Colonial experience was a term commonly used in the 19th and early 20th centuries for the acquisition of skills and experience in Australia by young English gentlemen, in the expectation of preferential treatment back in England when applying for a position with the possibility of advancement, such as a clerk in a large mercantile establishment. The jackaroo's employment may have been made by agreement between his father and the wealthy squatter through some connection, with the son working for a year in a variety of roles for his board and lodging. This was often seen as a great advantage to the squatter, who gained an intelligent and subservient worker at minimal expense.

=== Early 20th century ===
In 1933, A. J. Cotton stated that "today, the Arbitration Court (Commonwealth Court of Conciliation and Arbitration) says that a jackeroo must be paid 25/- [shillings] per week. If an ordinary jackeroo paid the station 25 shillings per week for the first twelve months, he would not compensate them for the damage he does (just through want of experience), no matter how willing he may be. It just happens that way, and all the Arbitration Courts, the curse of Australia, won't alter it."

Bill Harney states that there was no division of rank in the outlying camps, "all ate around the same fire and slept in the open. But at the head-station a change came over all this. The social strata of station life, reading from top to bottom, was bosses, jackaroos, men and blacks. This was a carry-over from the early days, when a rigid caste system ruled the land."

This was most clearly evident in the segregated eating arrangements. "The boss and the jackaroos ate meals in the 'big' or 'government' house. [...] The men – that is, the stockmen, teamsters, blacksmiths, etc. – ate their tucker in the kitchen and slept in the huts, while the Aborigines were given a hand-out from the door of the kitchen and ate it on the woodheap [firewood]."

"And strangely enough, this division of caste had caste bells which called us to our meals – a tinkling bell for government house, a horse bell for the kitchen men, and a triangle for the blacks on the wood-heaps." ... "In keeping with this system, the bush towns maintained a social tradition of coffee rooms for the gentry and dining rooms for the workers."

In the 1936 book Jackeroos: their duties and prospects in Australia, the author Francis Ernest Vigars states, "A jackeroo may be called upon to do all manner of work on a station, such as clerical work, boundary riding, mustering sheep and cattle, fencing [repairing fences], and generally any work there may be about the place, so that he not only needs a fair education, but intelligence and adaptability". Vigars continues, "A jackeroo is a title signifying a youth under training for the pastoral profession, and corresponding to the midshipman on a warship – an apprentice in the Mercantile Marine Service – or in a commercial house – an articled clerk in a solicitor's office, and so on."

=== Late 20th century ===
The traditional method for training young men for practical occupations had been the apprenticeship, and this began to be replaced by programs of formal schooling. The jackaroo, as a form of apprenticeship, followed the trend.

==== Changes in Australian agricultural society ====
1975 – Michael Thornton wrote a small book hoping to contribute "to the memories of what might well become a dying avenue of Australian tradition".

Dissatisfaction with the existing practices began to be expressed:

1978 – "Jackaroos are, or were, sweated labour. The legend is that they are social equals with the station owners, and are virtually treated as belonging to the family. Because of this, they receive only about half the pay of a station hand, and are liable for duty at any time."

Most jillaroos returned to the cities after the 1939–45 War ended. But during the '70s, as a consequence of feminist thinking, a new source of jillaroos began to appear. Susan Cottam, an English woman, described her experiences in Western Queensland from 3 March 1966 to 3 March 1968, in the form of a journal.

=== 21st century ===
Dubbo and Kimberley Technical and further education (TAFE) centres provide a certificate course of practical experiences for people who want to work as jackaroos or jillaroos on rural properties. The course covers practical aspects of farm work at an introductory level.

== See also ==
- Cowboy
