= Ciudad Deportiva metro station =

Mexico City metro station

Ciudad Deportiva
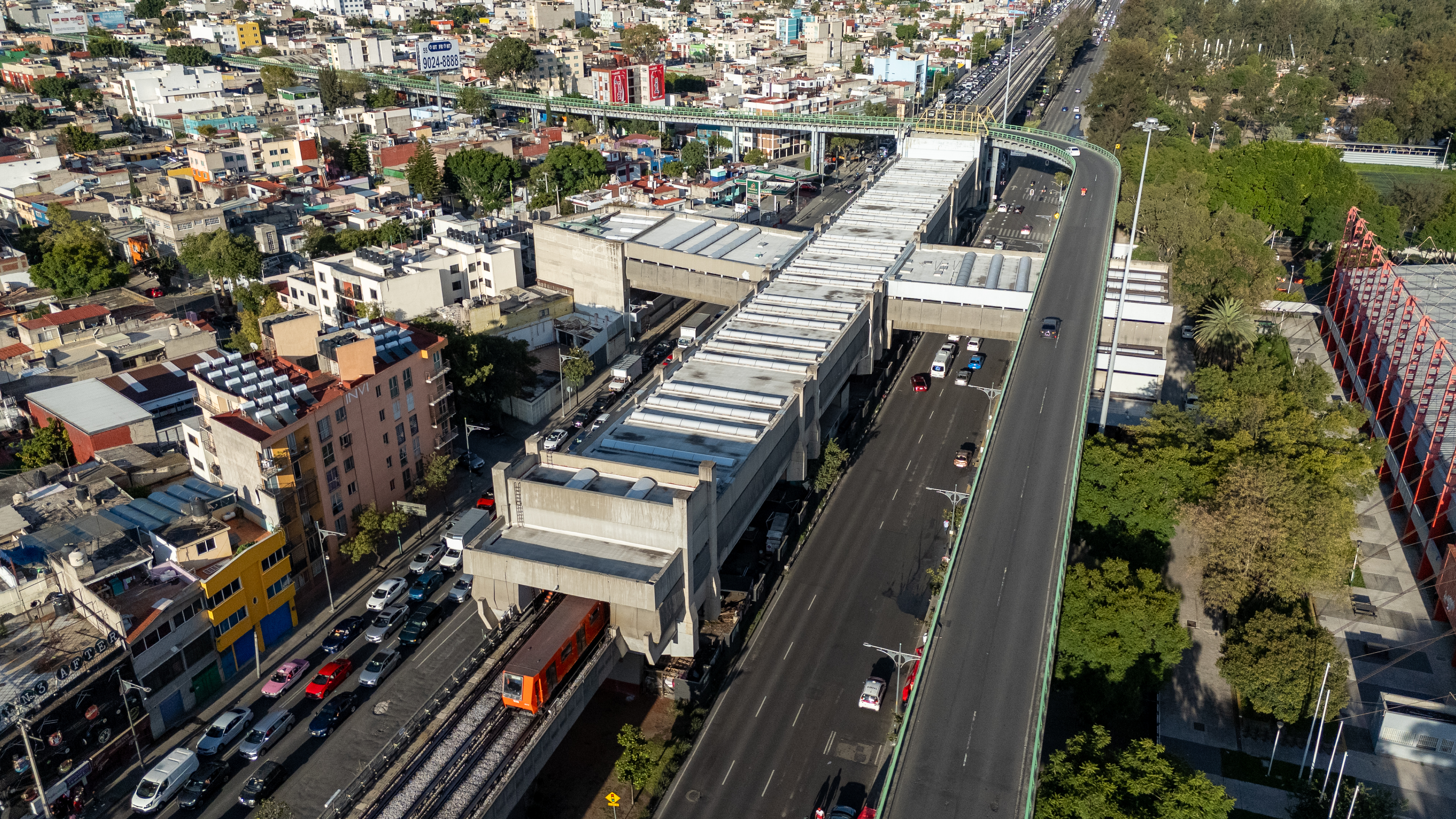
- Aerial view

General information
- Location: Mexico City; Mexico
- Coordinates: 19°24′30″N 99°05′28″W
- System: Mexico City Metro
- Platforms: 2 side platforms
- Tracks: 2

Construction
- Structure type: Elevated

Other information
- Status: In service

History
- Opened: 26 August 1987; 38 years ago

Key dates
- 17 December 2023: Temporarily closed
- 10 September 2024: Reopened

Passengers
- 2025: 2,248,481 (Note: The data here is limited to the most recent ten years to avoid excessive listings; earlier figures can be found in this page's history or on the Mexico City Metro website. To calculate the average daily ridership, the annual total is divided by 365 days (366 in leap years), with decimals omitted from the result. Each station per line is ranked individually, as the system counts transfer stations separately. The percentage change is calculated automatically using the data from the current year and the previous year.) ▲228.51%
- Rank: 170/195

Services
Preceding station	Mexico City Metro	Following station
Velódromo toward Tacubaya	Line 9	Puebla toward Pantitlán
Route map
Location
- Location within Mexico City
- Area map

Ciudad Deportiva (Spanish: Estación Ciudad Deportiva) is a metro station along Line 9 of the Mexico City Metro. It is named for the nearby the Magdalena Mixhuca Sports City.

Magdalena Mixuhca Sports City was enlarged in 1967 as part of the project to create the venues needed for the 1968 Summer Olympics. The Sports City is home to the Autódromo Hermanos Rodríguez (racetrack), the Estadio Alfredo Harp Helú (baseball stadium), the Estadio GNP Seguros concert venue (formerly named Foro Sol) the Agustín Melgar Olympic Velodrome, and the Palacio de los Deportes (indoor arena).

The station is elevated and sits in the median of the Viaducto Río Piedad. It was opened 26 August 1987. The logo for the station represents a player engaged in a Mesoamerican ballgame (a similar logo is used for Metro Deportivo 18 de Marzo on lines 3 and 6).

In December 2009 a man in his 30s was shot twice in the back next to the station. From 23 April to 15 May 2020, the station was temporarily closed due to the COVID-19 pandemic in Mexico. Due to subsidance in Pantitlán, Ciudad Deportiva was temporarily closed.

== Ridership ==
Annual passenger ridership
Year	Ridership	Average daily	Rank	% change	Ref.
2025	2,248,481	6,160	170/195	+228.51%
2024	684,450	1,870	187/195	−73.78%
2023	2,610,495	7,152	139/195	+10.32%
2022	2,366,275	6,482	144/195	+85.58%
2021	1,275,094	3,493	163/195	+5.08%
2020	1,213,423	3,315	181/195	−53.31%
2019	2,598,847	7,120	174/195	+6.37%
2018	2,443,174	6,693	177/195	+1.73%
2017	2,401,534	6,579	174/195	−0.28%
2016	2,408,254	6,579	179/195	−0.77%
