= Jardín Balbuena =

- Neighborhood of Mexico City
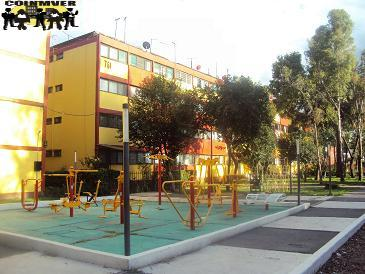
- A street in Jardín Balbuena
- Interactive map of Jardín Balbuena
- Country: Mexico
- City: Mexico City
- Borough: Venustiano Carranza
- Named for: Bernardo de Balbuena

Area
  - Total: 2.78 km^{2} (1.07 sq mi)

Population (2022)
  - Total: 31,688
  - Urban density: 11,396/km^{2} (29,520/sq mi)
- Postal code: 15900

Jardín Balbuena is a neighborhood in Venustiano Carranza, Mexico City, east of the historic center. The neighborhood was developed in the early 1950s and most of its infrastructure was designed by architects Mario Pani and Agustín Landa Verdugo. Jardín Balbuena is the seat of Venustiano Carranza, as it houses the headquarters of the borough.

== Location ==
Jardín Balbuena is located in the Venustiano Carranza borough of Mexico City.

The neighborhood is bordered by:

- Calzado Ignacio Zaragoza and Sidar y Rovirosa street on the north, across which is Colonia Moctezuma
- Lázaro Pavia street and Eje 3 Oriente Francisco del Paso y Troncoso on the west, across which is Magdalena Mixiuhca and Colonia El Parque
- Viaducto Miguel Alemán on the south, across which is Granjas México
- Jesús Galindo y Villa Avenue on the east, across which is Colonia Ignacio Zaragoza

== History ==
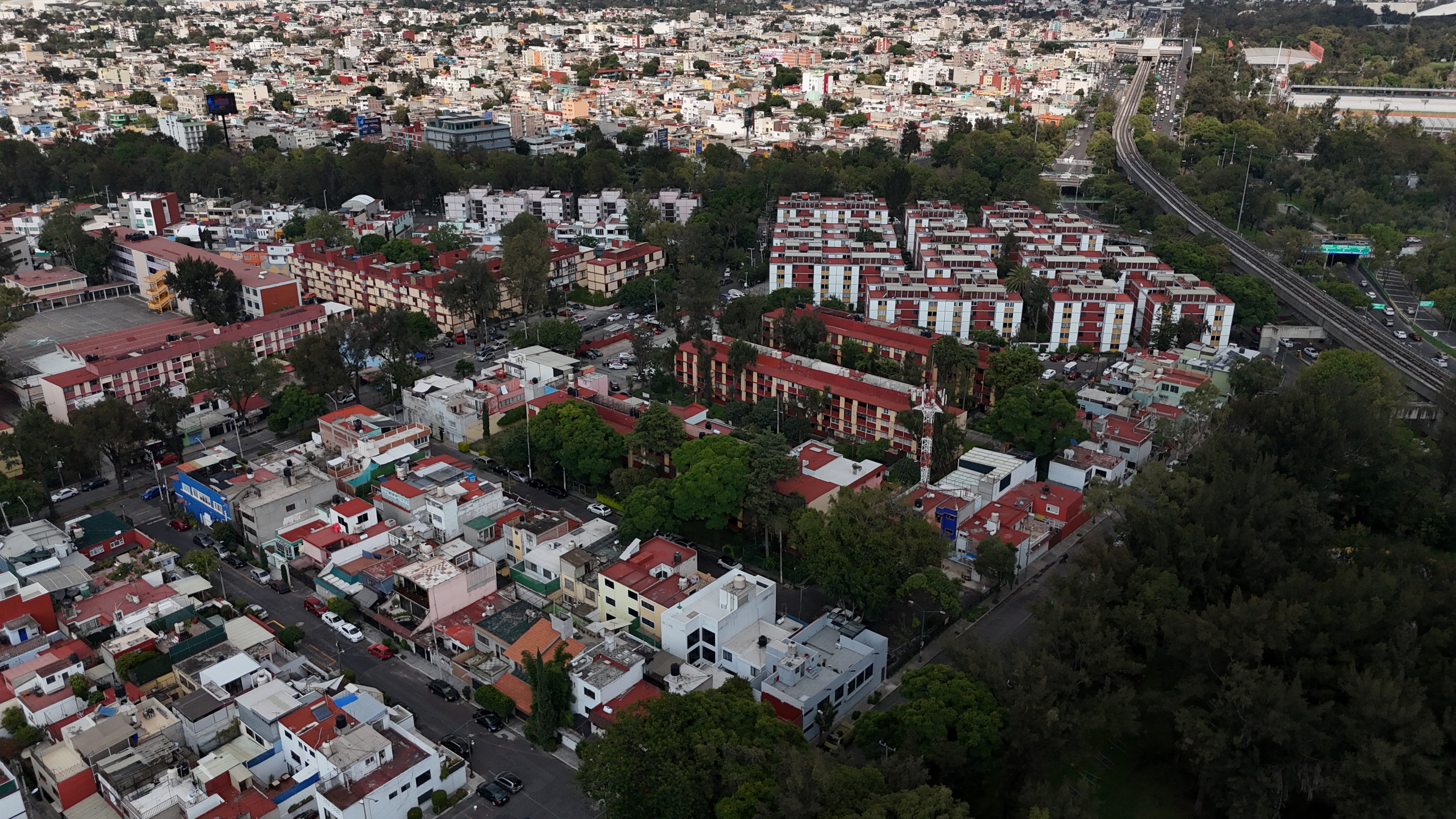
Aerial view of colonia Jardín Balbuena.

The area was known as Potrero de Balbuena (Balbuena Paddock), named for Spanish poet Bernardo de Balbuena, and was used by locals to feed their cattle. It was later bought by the Braniff family, who built two haciendas, Magadalena and Santa Lucía, and changed its name to Llanos de Balbuena (Balbuena Plains).

On 8 January 1910, Alberto Braniff took off his Voisin airplane, imported from France, from Llanos de Balbuena, and flew over Mexico City, becoming the first aviator to fly a plane in Mexico and the second in Latin America. Llanos de Balbuena became the first airfield in Mexico. On 30 November 1911, President Francisco I. Madero became the first Mexican head of state to fly in a plane, when he flew in George Miller Dyott's Deperdussin over Mexico City, taking off and landing in Llanos de Balbuena. It was also used by the fledgling Mexican Air Force for bomb target practice.

Jardín Balbuena was developed in the early 1950s funded by the Bank of Mexico. Mario Pani and Agustín Landa Verdugo were in charge of designing most of the neighborhood's infrastructure, such as the Unidad Kennedy, the biggest public housing project in Jardín Balbuena, named in honor of John F. Kennedy.

In 1968, the Agustín Melgar Olympic Velodrome was inaugurated. The venue hosted the track cycling events of the 1968 Summer Olympics.

== Transportation ==
=== Public transportation ===
The area is served by the Mexico City Metro Line 1 and Line 9.

Metro stations

- Moctezuma
- Balbuena
- Mixiuhca
- Velódromo

== Notable people ==
- Enrique Borja, footballer
- Hugo Sánchez, footballer and manager
- Armando Vega Gil, musician
