= Mixiuhca metro station =

Mexico City metro station

Mixiuhca
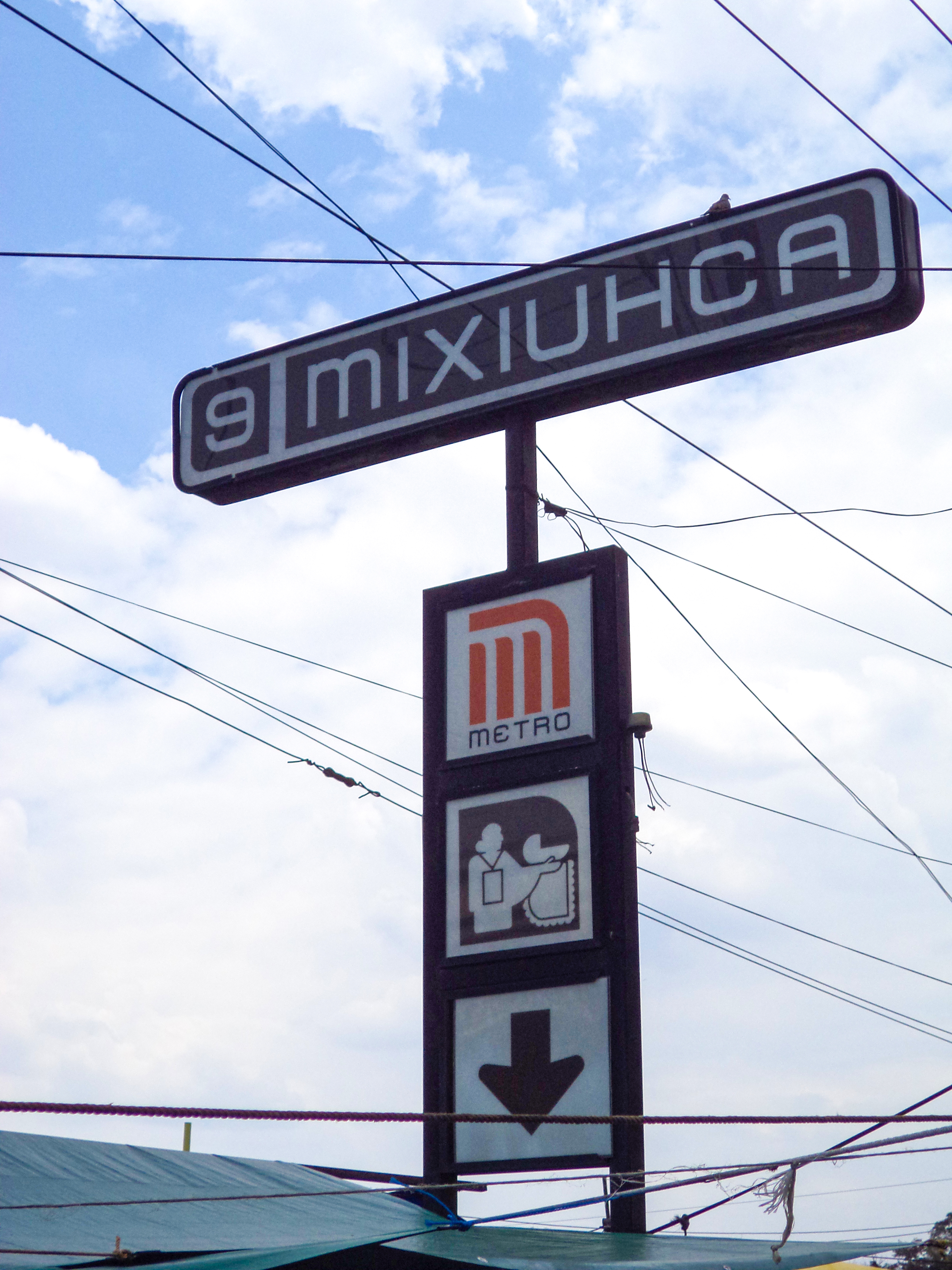

General information
- Location: Mexico City; Mexico
- Coordinates: 19°24′31″N 99°06′46″W
- System: Mexico City Metro
- Platforms: 2 side platforms
- Tracks: 2
- Connections: Mixiuhca

Construction
- Structure type: Underground

Other information
- Status: In service

History
- Opened: 26 August 1987; 38 years ago

Passengers
- 2025: 7,006,397 (Note: The data here is limited to the most recent ten years to avoid excessive listings; earlier figures can be found in this page's history or on the Mexico City Metro website. To calculate the average daily ridership, the annual total is divided by 365 days (366 in leap years), with decimals omitted from the result. Each station per line is ranked individually, as the system counts transfer stations separately. The percentage change is calculated automatically using the data from the current year and the previous year.) ▼5.49%
- Rank: 59/195

Services
Preceding station	Mexico City Metro	Following station
Jamaica toward Tacubaya	Line 9	Velódromo toward Pantitlán
Route map
Location
- Location within Mexico City
- Area map

Mixiuhca is a metro station along Line 9 of the Mexico City Metro serving the Jardín Balbuena and Colonia Magdalena Mixiuhca districts in the Venustiano Carranza borough of Mexico City, Mexico.

The station's icon is a silhouette of a woman holding a newborn baby. In the Nahuatl language mixiuhca means "place of births". The origin of this name comes from one of the Aztecs' migration stories. When the Aztecs first came to the Valley of Mexico, they lived for a long time in a place called Tizapan. However, they were violently expelled from there. Legend states that they ran out to the surrounding swamps using their shields and spears as rafts for the women and children. They ran across three places: Mexicaltzingo, Iztacalco and Temazcaltitlán, and precisely there, in that last place, one of the women gave birth to a child. From then on, the name of that place became Mixiuhca.

The station was opened on 26 August 1987. From 23 April to 21 June 2020, the station was temporarily closed due to the COVID-19 pandemic in Mexico.

== Ridership ==
Annual passenger ridership
Year	Ridership	Average daily	Rank	% change	Ref.
2025	7,006,397	19,195	59/195	−5.49%
2024	7,413,757	20,256	49/195	+4.71%
2023	7,080,229	19,397	55/195	+3.81%
2022	6,820,483	18,686	51/195	+55.45%
2021	4,387,575	12,020	66/195	+15.90%
2020	3,785,696	10,343	98/195	−43.45%
2019	6,694,736	18,341	98/195	+1.30%
2018	6,608,798	18,106	101/195	−1.72%
2017	6,724,486	18,423	94/195	−4.06%
2016	7,009,299	19,151	92/195	−1.91%

== Gallery ==
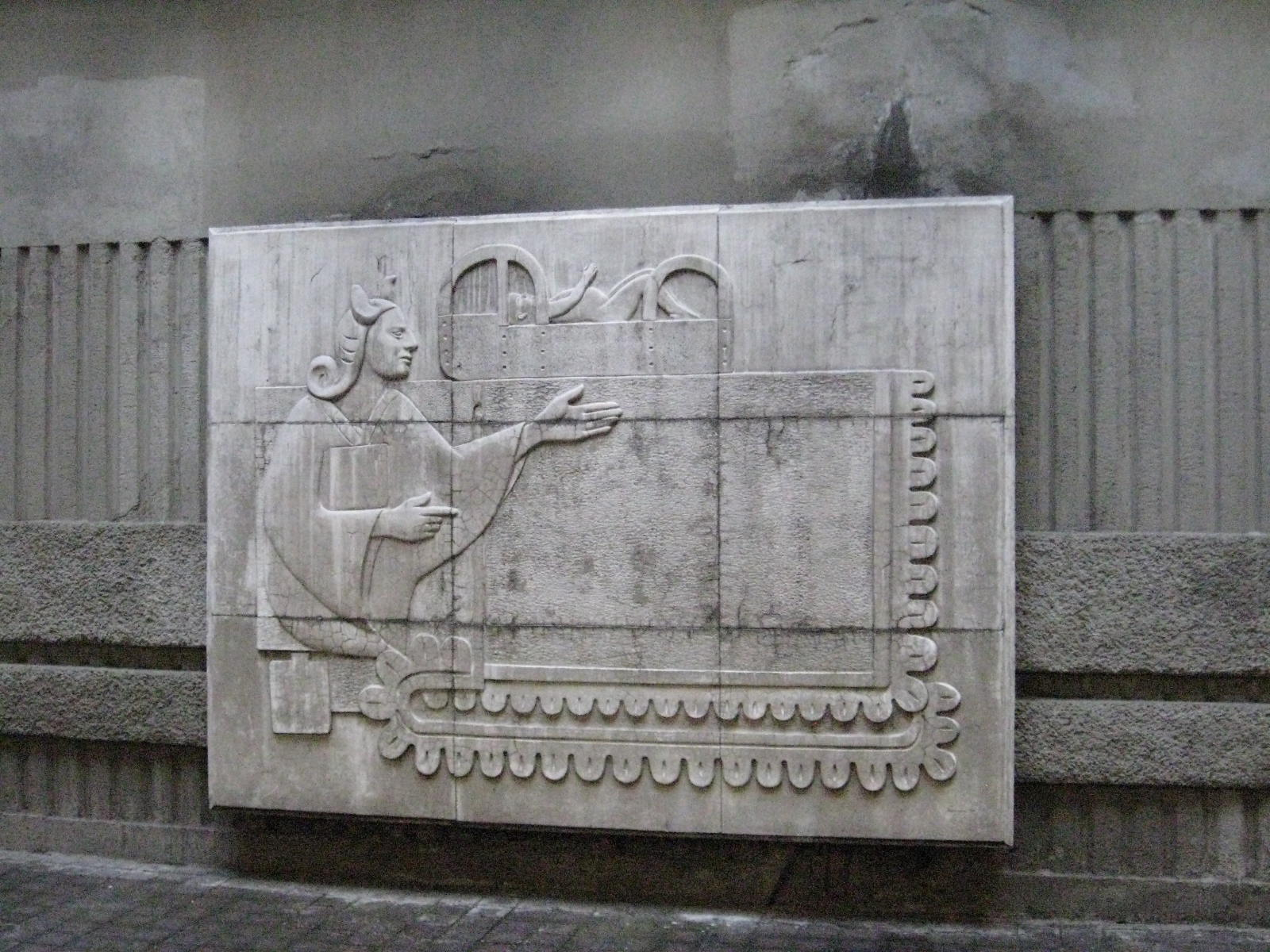
Stone glyph symbolizing the Metro station Mixiuhca located on the eastbound platform
