= Mexico City Metro Line 9 =

Metro line in Mexico City

Line 9

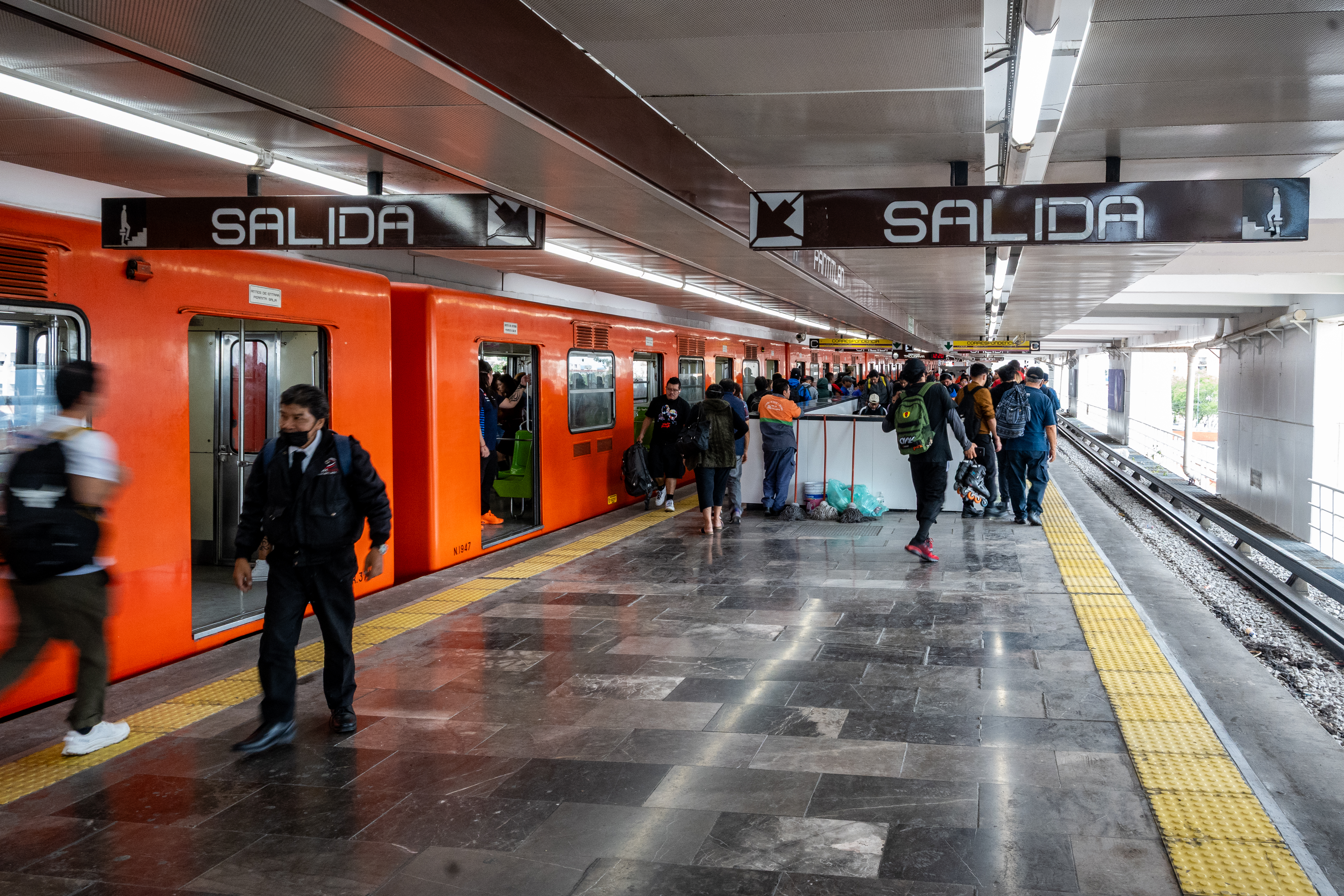
- An MP-68 train at Pantitlán station

Overview
- Locale: Mexico City
- Termini: Pantitlán; Tacubaya
- Connecting lines: at Tacubaya; at Centro Médico; at Chabacano; at Jamaica; at Pantitlán
- Stations: 12
- Website: metro.cdmx.gob.mx

Service
- Type: Rapid transit
- System: Mexico City Metro
- Operator: Sistema de Transporte Colectivo (STC)
- Rolling stock: NM-79, NC-82, NM-83, NE-92
- Ridership: 80,632,078 (2024)

History
- Opened: 26 August 1987; 38 years ago
- Last extension: 1988

Technical
- Line length: 13.033 km (8.1 mi)
- Track length: 15.375 km (9.6 mi)
- Number of tracks: 2
- Track gauge: 1,435 mm (4 ft 8 1/2 in) standard gauge with roll ways along track
- Electrification: Guide bar, 750 V DC
- Operating speed: 36 km/h (22 mph)
Route map
Line 9 route highlighted in gray

Mexico City Metro Line 9 is one of the 12 metro lines built in Mexico City, Mexico.

== General information ==
Line 9 was the 8th metro line to be built in the network, built between 1985 and 1988. (Line 8 started operations in 1994.) It is identified by the color dark brown, and runs from East to West in an almost straight fashion. It was built in order to support Line 1, providing a redistribution alternative for east–west commuters. It starts in the multi-line transfer station Pantitlán and ends at the western neighborhood of Tacubaya, both stations also served by Line 1. As a comparison, the section between Pantitlán and Tacubaya is served by 19 stations in Line 1, whereas Line 9 has only 12, which would translate in a faster alternative.

Line 9 is built in its easternmost section above the Rio Churubusco and Rio de la Piedad Avenues. Then it reaches an underground route near the Magdalena Mixiuhca Complex and it continues under the Eje 3 Sur until reaching the Tacubaya zone, where the last station is built under Jalisco avenue. As part of the first expansion plans in the 1980s the line is expected to turn west after Jalisco Avenue to reach Observatorio Station.

== History ==
Due to the subsidence of the city, there have been problems with the elevated portion of the line (which runs from Pantitlán to Velódromo stations). Following the collapse of a Mexico City Metro overpass in 2021, these concerns increased when commuters reported plainly visible deformations in the bridge connecting the Pantitlán and Puebla stations. As of February 2023, authorities had reinforced Line 9's overpass with metallic supports. The city government informed that a small section between Pantitlán and Puebla stations will be rebuilt between November 2023 and April 2024 as a result of the problem's persistence. On 10 September 2024, the closed section of Line 9 was opened after the completion of rehabilitation works.

=== Chronology ===
- 26 August 1987: from Pantitlán to Centro Médico.
- 29 August 1988: from Centro Médico to Tacubaya.

== Rolling stock ==
Line 9 has had different types of rolling stock throughout the years.

- Alstom MP-68: 1987–1996; 1996–2008
- Concarril NM-73: 1987–2008
- Concarril NM-79: 2008–present
- Alstom MP-82: 1987–1994
- Bombardier NC-82: 2008–present
- Concarril NM-83: 2013–present
- CAF NE-92 2018–present

As of 2020, out of the 390 trains in the Mexico City Metro network, 29 are in service in Line 9.

== Station list ==
Key (Note: The following list was adapted from different websites and official maps.: Metro connections obtained from the official Mexico City Metro system map.; Accessibility obtained from the Mexico City Metro system map. In some cases, the map omits the accessibility icon as the station(s) are actually partially accessible. However, the respective websites of each station on the official site indicate the respective accessibility methods. Stations with the symbol ‡ are fully accessible; stations with the symbol † are partially accessible.; Cablebús obtained from their official website.; Centro de transferencia modal (CETRAM;) obtained from the official website of the Órgano Regulador de Transporte.; Ecobici obtained from their official website.; Metrobús obtained from the Mexico City Metrobús system map.; Mexibús obtained from the official Mexico City Metro system map.; Mexicable obtained from the official Mexico City Metro system map.; Public buses network (peseros) obtained from the official website of the Órgano Regulador de Transporte.; Red de Transporte de Pasajeros obtained from their official website.; Trolleybuses obtained from their official website.)
Handicapped/disabled access	Fully accessible station	Cablebús Line {{{3}}}	Cablebús connection	Red de Transporte de Pasajeros	RTP connection
Handicapped/disabled access	Partially accessible station	Mexibús	Mexibús connection	Tren Interurbano	Tren Interurbano connection
Transfer hub	CETRAM transfer station	Mexicable	Mexicable connection	Tren Suburbano	Tren Suburbano connection
Transfer hub	ETRAM transfer station	Mexico City Metro	Mexico City Metro connection	Trolleybus	Trolleybus connection
Ecobici	Ecobici bikeshare	Mexico City minubus	Pesero connection	Xochimilco Light Rail	Xochimilco Light Rail connection

The stations from west to east are:

Station	Handicapped/disabled access	Opened	Level	Distance (km)		Connections	Location
Station	Handicapped/disabled access	Opened	Level	Between stations	Total	Connections	Location
Pantitlán	Handicapped/disabled access	August 26, 1987	Elevated	—N/a	0.0	168; 11B, 11C, 19F, 19G	Iztacalco/ Venustiano Carranza
Puebla	Handicapped/disabled access	August 26, 1987	Elevated	1.5	1.5	9D, 9E, 19E, 19H	Iztacalco/ Venustiano Carranza
Ciudad Deportiva	Handicapped/disabled access	August 26, 1987	Elevated	0.9	2.4	9E	Iztacalco/ Venustiano Carranza
Velódromo	Handicapped/disabled access	August 26, 1987	Elevated	1.3	3.7	9E, 14A	Venustiano Carranza
Mixiuhca		August 26, 1987	Underground	1.0	4.7	9C, 9E, 14A	Venustiano Carranza
Jamaica	Handicapped/disabled access	August 26, 1987	Underground	0.9	5.6	Line 4; 37; 5A, 9C (at distance), 9E (at distance), 14A (at distance)	Venustiano Carranza
Chabacano	Handicapped/disabled access	August 26, 1987	Underground	1.2	6.8	2A, 31B, 33, 111A, 145A; 9C, 9E, 14A, 17C, 17H, 17I	Cuauhtémoc
Lázaro Cárdenas		August 26, 1987	Underground	1.1	7.9	9C, 9E	Cuauhtémoc
Centro Médico	Handicapped/disabled access	August 26, 1987	Underground	1.2	9.1	9C, 9E	Cuauhtémoc
Chilpancingo	Handicapped/disabled access	August 29, 1988	Underground	1.3	10.5	9C, 9E	Cuauhtémoc
Patriotismo	Handicapped/disabled access	August 29, 1988	Underground	1.1	11.6	13A, 115A, 200; 9C, 9E, 21A	Cuauhtémoc/ Miguel Hidalgo
Tacubaya	Handicapped/disabled access	August 29, 1988	Underground	1.3	12.8	110, 110B, 110C, 112, 113B, 115, 118, 119, 200; 1B, 9C, 9E, 21A	Miguel Hidalgo

== Proposed extension ==
Being Tacubaya a provisional terminal, Line 9 had an original project for being expanded to the west to reach Observatorio station as Line 1 did. After the announcement for the Toluca–Mexico City commuter rail, an expansion towards Observatorio station was announced in 2014. As of 2026, the project is still in its planning stage.

No.	Station	Date opened	Situation	Distance (km)		Transfers	Location
No.	Station	Date opened	Situation	Between stations	Total	Transfers	Location
13	Observatorio	To be determined	Underground	1.5	14.3	Line 1; Line 12 (under construction); El Insurgente; 21D; West Bus Terminal	Miguel Hidalgo

== Ridership ==
The following table shows each of Line 9 stations total and average daily ridership during 2019.

†	Transfer station
†‡	Transfer station and terminal

Rank	Station	Total ridership	Average daily
1	Pantitlán†‡	32,839,328	89,971
2	Tacubaya†‡	16,335,719	44,755
3	Chilpancingo	15,212,533	41,678
4	Puebla	12,185,200	33,384
5	Mixiuhca	6,694,736	18,342
6	Patriotismo	6,628,532	18,160
7	Centro Médico†	5,143,782	14,093
8	Jamaica†	4,561,989	12,499
9	Lázaro Cárdenas	4,363,376	11,954
10	Chabacano†	3,912,641	10,720
11	Velódromo	3,288,845	9,011
12	Ciudad Deportiva	2,598,847	7,120
Total		113,765,528	311,686

== Tourism ==
Line 9 passes near several places of interest:

- Magdalena Mixhuca Sports City, Olympic Park used for the 1968 Summer Olympics
  - Palacio de los Deportes, indoor sports arena and concert venue.
  - Autódromo Hermanos Rodríguez, motorsport race track venue of the Formula One Mexican Grand Prix.
  - Foro Sol, sports and concert venue.

== See also ==
- List of Mexico City Metro lines
