= Velódromo metro station =

Mexico City metro station

Velódromo
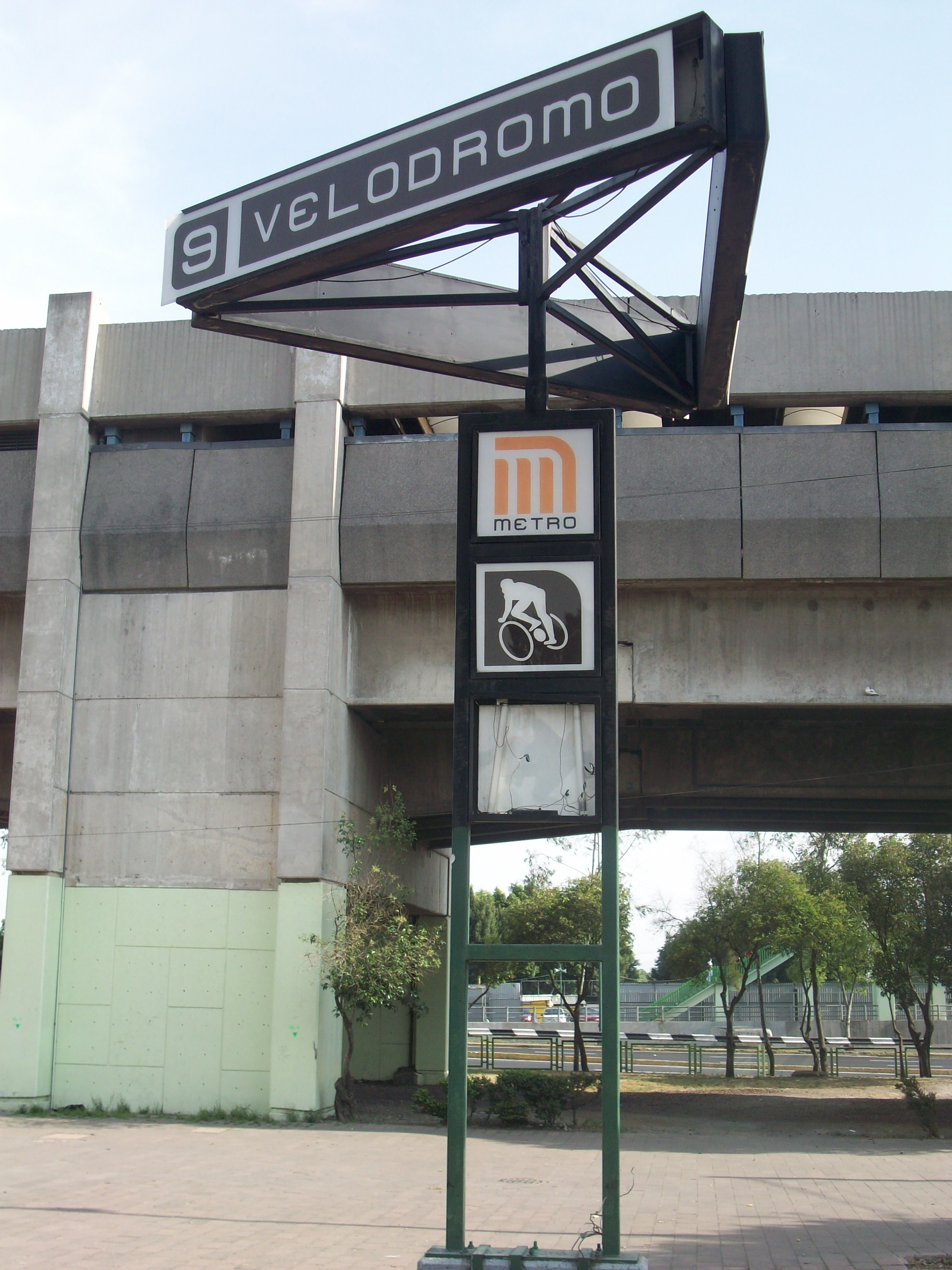

General information
- Location: Mexico City; Mexico
- Coordinates: 19°24′31″N 99°06′11″W
- System: Mexico City Metro
- Platforms: 2 side platforms
- Tracks: 2

Construction
- Structure type: Elevated

Other information
- Status: In service

History
- Opened: 26 August 1987; 38 years ago

Passengers
- 2025: 2,872,354 (Note: The data here is limited to the most recent ten years to avoid excessive listings; earlier figures can be found in this page's history or on the Mexico City Metro website. To calculate the average daily ridership, the annual total is divided by 365 days (366 in leap years), with decimals omitted from the result. Each station per line is ranked individually, as the system counts transfer stations separately. The percentage change is calculated automatically using the data from the current year and the previous year.) ▼77.55%
- Rank: 153/195

Services
Preceding station	Mexico City Metro	Following station
Mixiuhca toward Tacubaya	Line 9	Ciudad Deportiva toward Pantitlán
Route map
Location
- Location within Mexico City
- Area map

Velódromo (Spanish: Estación Velódromo) is a metro station located on Line 9 of the Mexico City Metro. It is named after the nearby Agustín Melgar Olympic Velodrome, or bicycle-racing venue, built for the 1968 Summer Olympics that were held in Mexico City.

Velódromo is an elevated station built at the portion of Line 9 that branches away from Viaducto Río de La Piedad to follow Eje 3 Sur (Avenida Morelos) when travelling west toward Metro Tacubaya. The station opened on 26 August 1987. The logo for the station shows the silhouette of a bicycle racer. It serves the Jardín Balbuena and the Granjas México neighborhoods.

Local bus service to the station includes trolleybus line S of STE, which runs west to Metro Chapultepec along the arterial thoroughfares known as Eje 2 Sur and Eje 2A Sur and is one of two high-frequency trolleybus lines that STE calls "Zero-Emissions Corridors".

From 23 April to 15 May 2020, the station was temporarily closed due to the COVID-19 pandemic in Mexico.

== Ridership ==
Annual passenger ridership
Year	Ridership	Average daily	Rank	% change	Ref.
2025	2,872,354	7,869	153/195	−77.55%
2024	12,793,922	34,956	13/195	+311.06%
2023	3,112,426	8,527	131/195	+22.15%
2022	2,548,133	6,981	138/195	+43.96%
2021	1,770,000	4,849	147/195	+16.57%
2020	1,518,406	4,148	165/195	−53.83%
2019	3,288,845	9,010	158/195	+1.08%
2018	3,253,838	8,914	158/195	−0.55%
2017	3,271,933	8,964	156/195	−3.82%
2016	3,401,904	9,294	153/195	+2.98%

== Nearby ==
- Palacio de los Deportes – nearby sports arena and indoor concert venue
- Estadio GNP Seguros – nearby baseball stadium and outdoor concert venue (formerly Foro Sol)
