= Agustín Melgar Olympic Velodrome =

Velodrome in Mexico City, Mexico

Coordinates: 19°24′35″N 99°6′12″W

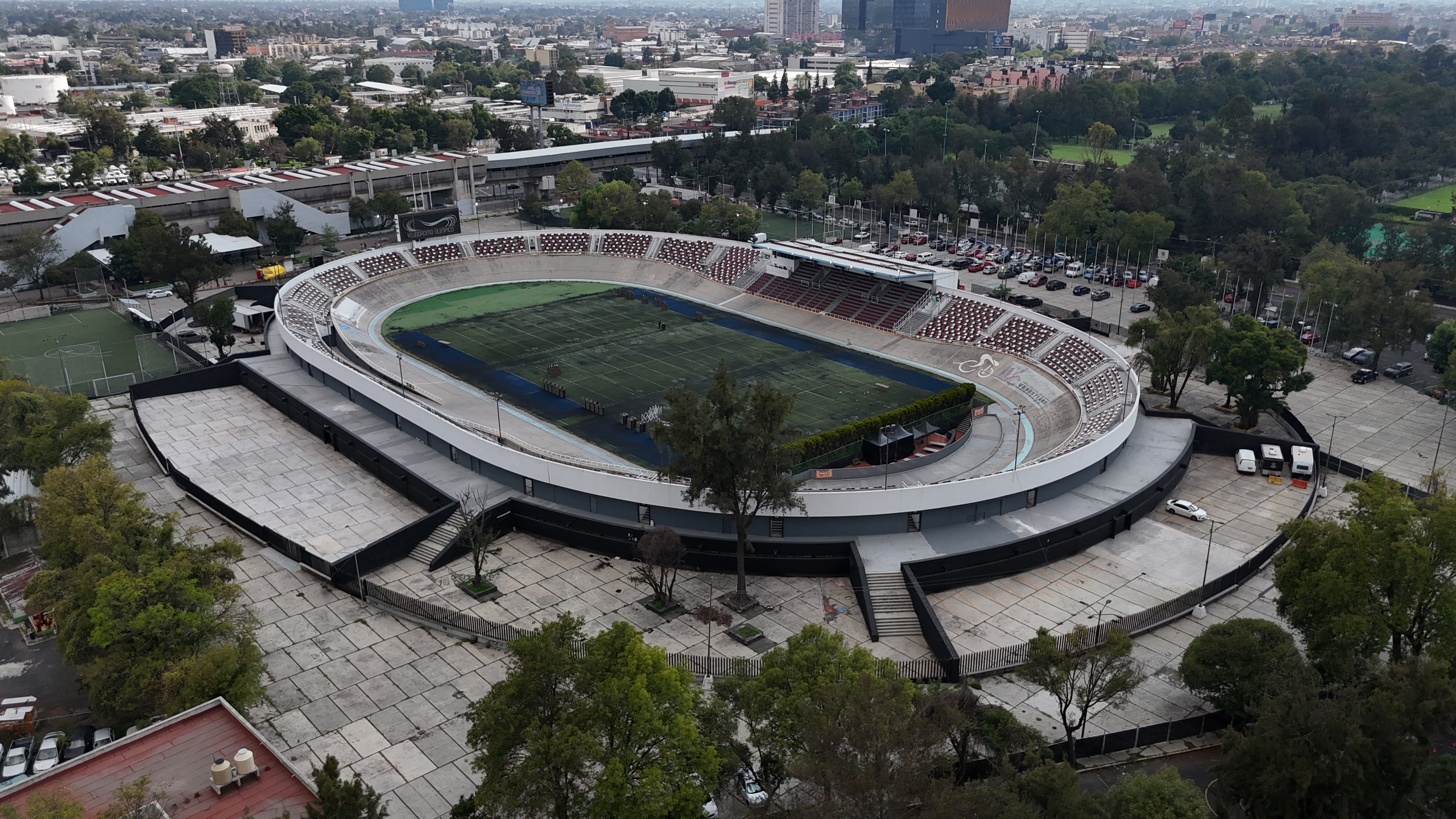
- Aerial view of the velodrome.
- Interactive map of Agustín Melgar Olympic Velodrome
- Full name: Velódromo Olímpico Agustín Melgar
- Location: Jardín Balbuena, Venustiano Carranza; Mexico City; Mexico
- Capacity: 6,400
- Public transit: Velódromo

Construction
- Opened: 1968
- Architect: Herbert Schurmann

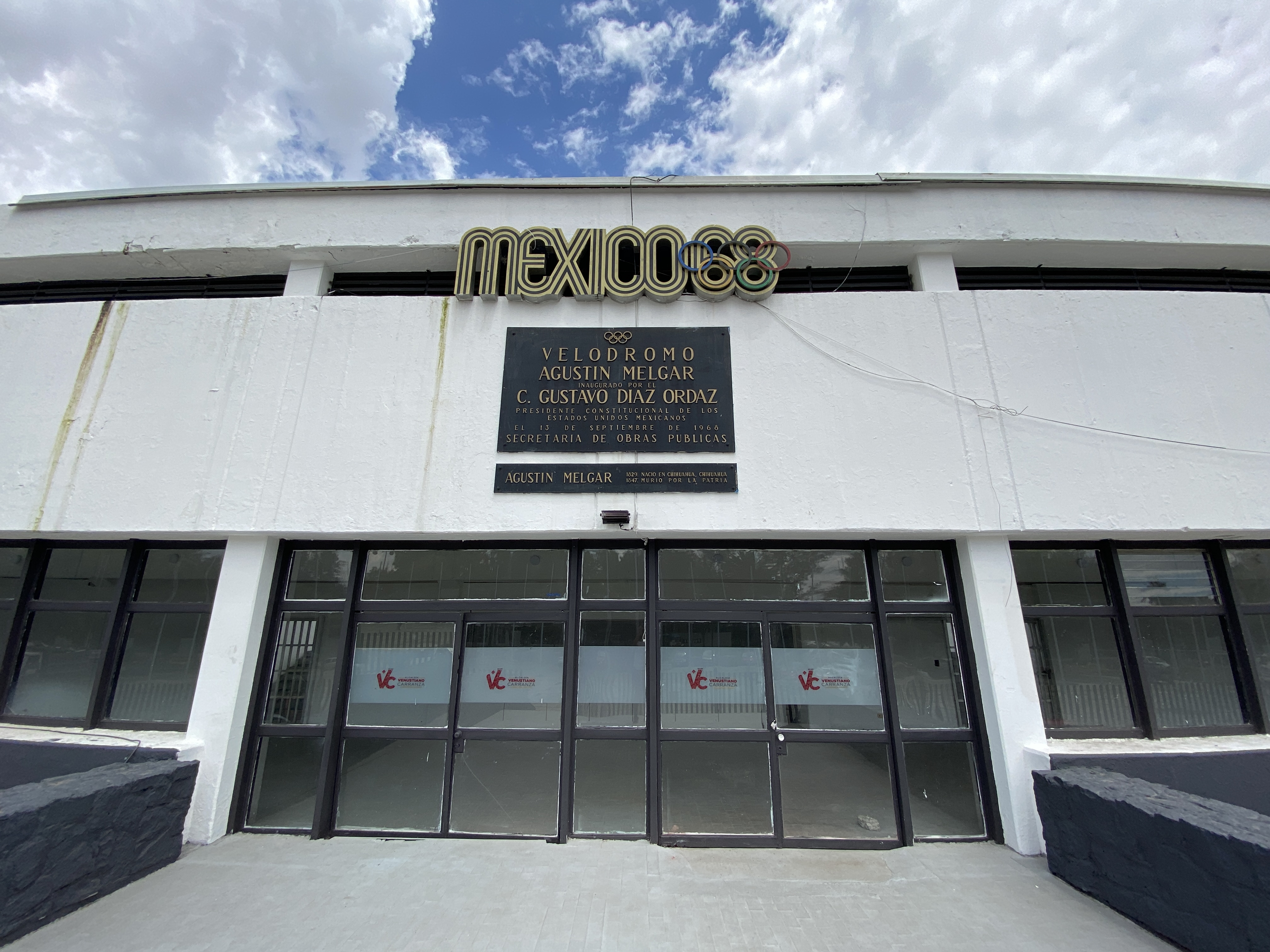
Access to the venue.

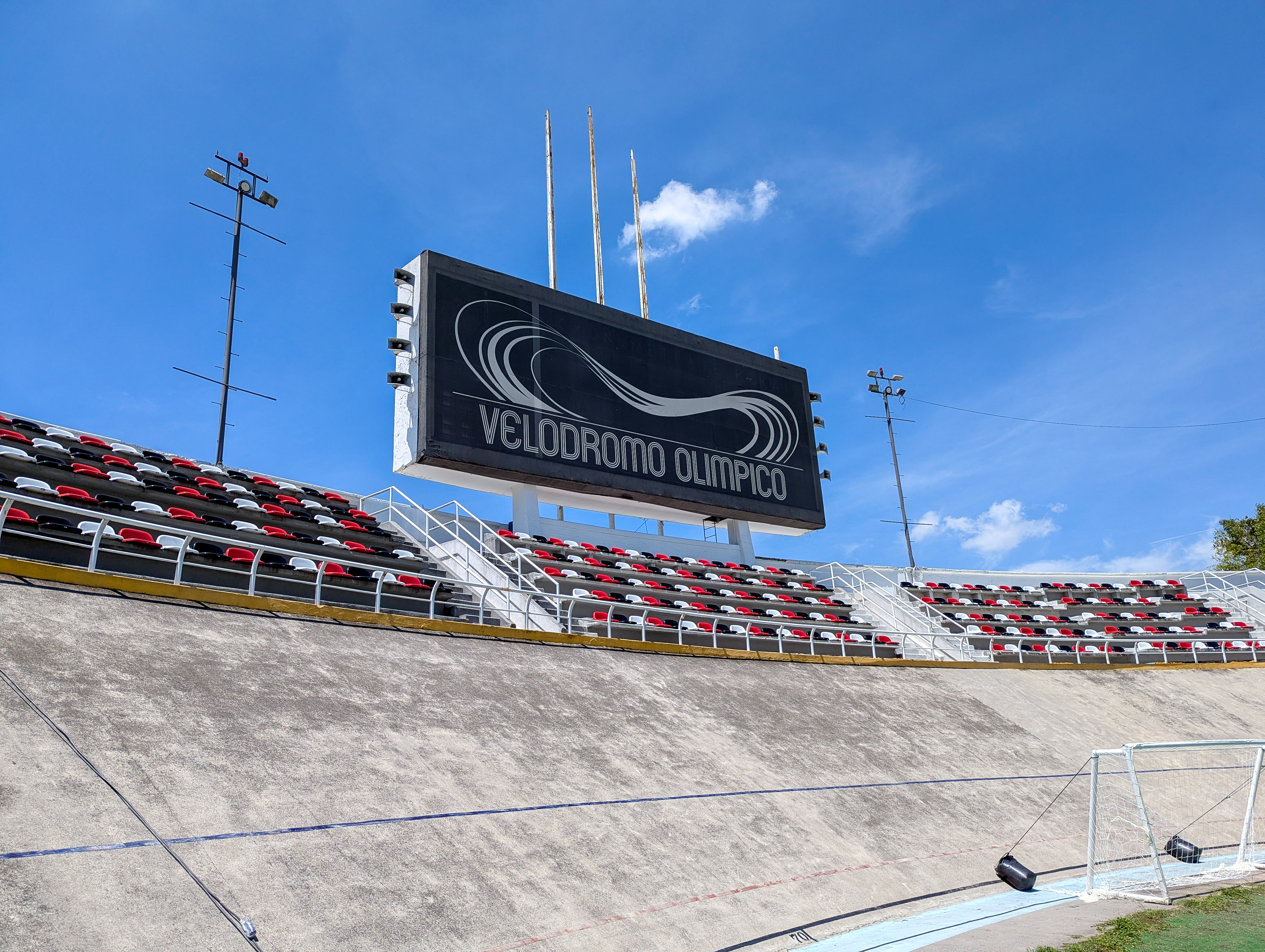
Court and main scoreboard.

The Agustín Melgar Olympic Velodrome is a velodrome located in the Magdalena Mixhuca Sports City sports complex located in Mexico City, Mexico.

== History ==
It hosted the track cycling events for the 1968 Summer Olympics. it was also used by many cyclists who attempted to break the world hour record. The record was broken 39 times at the velodrome, including one by Eddy Merckx.

The facility holds 6,400 people and the infield is synthetic turf lined for both association football and small-sized American football games.

== See also ==
- List of cycling tracks and velodromes
