= Magdalena Mixhuca Sports City =

Mexico City sports venue

Coordinates: 19°24′19″N 99°5′46″W

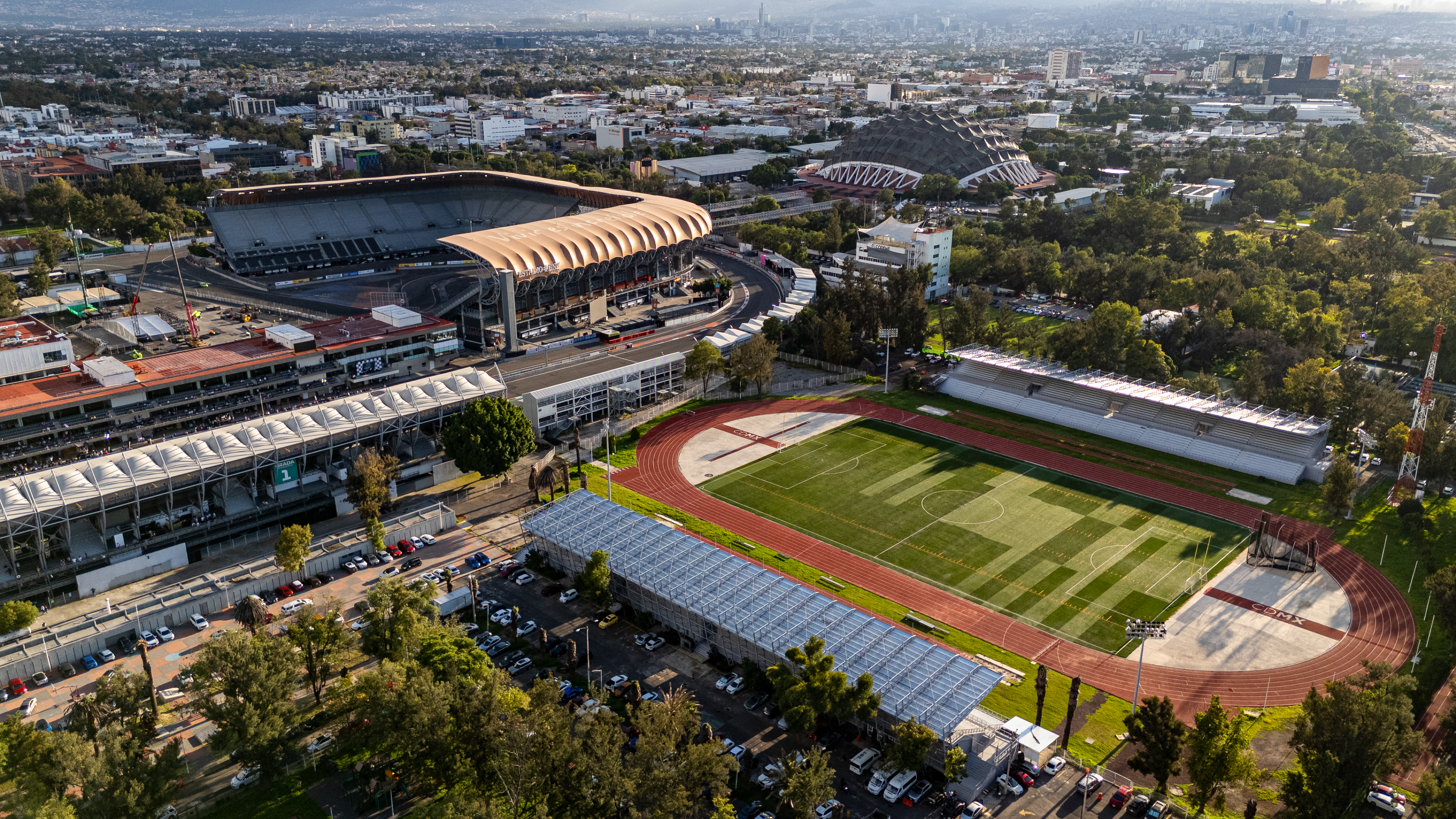
Aerial view of the sports complex, showing the Autódromo Hermanos Rodríguez, the GNP Seguros Stadium, the Jesús Martínez “Palillo” Main Stadium, and the Palacio de los Deportes in the background.

The Magdalena Mixhuca Sports City (Spanish: Ciudad Deportiva Magdalena Mixhuca) is an Olympic Park which was used during the 1968 Summer Olympics. Found in the area of Mexico City known as the Magdalena Mixhuca, the park continues to serve as a venue for cultural, social, worship and sport events. The Park is administered by the government of Mexico City.

It contains numerous sports venues, most notably the Sport Palace and it has hosted important events, most prominently the 1968 Summer Olympics.

== 1968 Summer Olympics ==
- Juan Escutia Sports Palace - basketball
- Agustín Melgar Olympic Velodrome - track cycling
- Fernando Montes de Oca Fencing Hall - fencing
- Municipal Stadium - field hockey

== The Autódromo Hermanos Rodríguez ==
("Rodríguez Brothers Racetrack") is a 4.304 km (2.674 mi) race track in Mexico City, Mexico, named for the famous Rodríguez brothers, Pedro and Ricardo. Built in a public park in 1959, the circuit hosted its first Formula One Grand Prix in 1962, as a non-Championship race. The following year the Mexican Grand Prix became a full World Championship event. The circuit remained part of the F1 calendar through 1970, when spectator overcrowding caused unsafe conditions. When the track re-opened in 1986, the circuit boasted a new pit complex, as well as improved safety all around. The Mexican GP remained until 1992, when the circuit once again became too unsafe for the Formula One cars of the period and Mexico did not return until further upgrades were completed in 2015.

The circuit is located within the public park of the Magdalena Mixhuca in northeast Mexico City. The circuit is owned by the Government of the city, but is currently operated under concession by Corporación Interamericana de Entretenimiento, S.A. de C.V. or CIE, through OCESA, one of CIE's subsidiaries. CIE also organizes the NASCAR and Desafío Corona races in this circuit and rents the circuits to other parties, including race organizers, automobile clubs and track amateurs for fees that are controversial due to their disproportionately high amounts compared to other ex-F1 courses.

The circuit itself has a very bumpy surface, mostly due to Mexico City's location on a geologically active region. Furthermore, with an elevation of 2,285 m,(7,500 ft) the thin air makes breathing more difficult for both the drivers and their cars. The circuit got its name shortly after it opened when Ricardo Rodríguez died in practice for the non-Championship 1962 Mexican Grand Prix (Ricardo's brother Pedro would also lose his life behind the wheel years later).

The circuit has an extremely fast final corner (the Peraltada) before a long start/finish straight, and thus reminded some of Monza; however, unlike Monza's Curva Parabolica, the Peraltada curve is slightly banked, allowing even more speed through the corner. It was at this corner that Rodríguez crashed, although it is unclear whether this was due to excess speed or suspension failure. After the Mexican Grand Prix of 1992, a baseball stadium was built on the inside of this curve. When the Champ Car series began using the track in 2002, the Peraltada curve was partially bypassed by a series of sharp turns entering and exiting the baseball field; re-entering the Peraltada halfway through.

The NASCAR Nationwide Series started racing at Autódromo Hermanos Rodríguez in the 2005 season, with a chicane on the main straightaway to slow the cars down. They also introduced a curve between the short course and the Ese del Lago to bypass the latter, but avoiding the stadium detour. Martin Truex Jr. won the race in 2005, and Denny Hamlin won in 2006. For the 2007 race, the chicane was removed to increase passing opportunities down the front straight and into turn 1, and Juan Pablo Montoya from Bogotá, Colombia, won the race.

The A1 Grand Prix series started racing at Autódromo Hermanos Rodríguez in the 2007 season using the full-track configuration used by Formula 1. Alex Yoong from Malaysia won the sprint race and Oliver Jarvis from the United Kingdom won the feature race.

It is also the location of the FIA World Endurance Championship's 6 Hours of Mexico endurance race and the Mexico City ePrix.

== Estadio GNP Seguros ==
The Autódromo is unique in the sense that there is a baseball stadium inside Turn 14. The stadium, called Estadio GNP Seguros is home to the Diablos Rojos del México, and also hosts music concerts.

Artists like Madonna, The Rolling Stones, U2, and Paul McCartney are just a few of the names that have played there. The Coca-Cola Zero Festival was held at the racetrack on April 12, 2008. Acts include The Smashing Pumpkins, The Mars Volta, My Chemical Romance, My Morning Jacket, Belanova, Bright Eyes, Kinky, Miranda, La Gusana Ciega, Jumbo, Division Minuscula, Timo Maas, Quiero Club, The Faint, Chetes, Le Baron, and Austin TV.
