= Estadio GNP Seguros =

Mexico City multipurpose venue

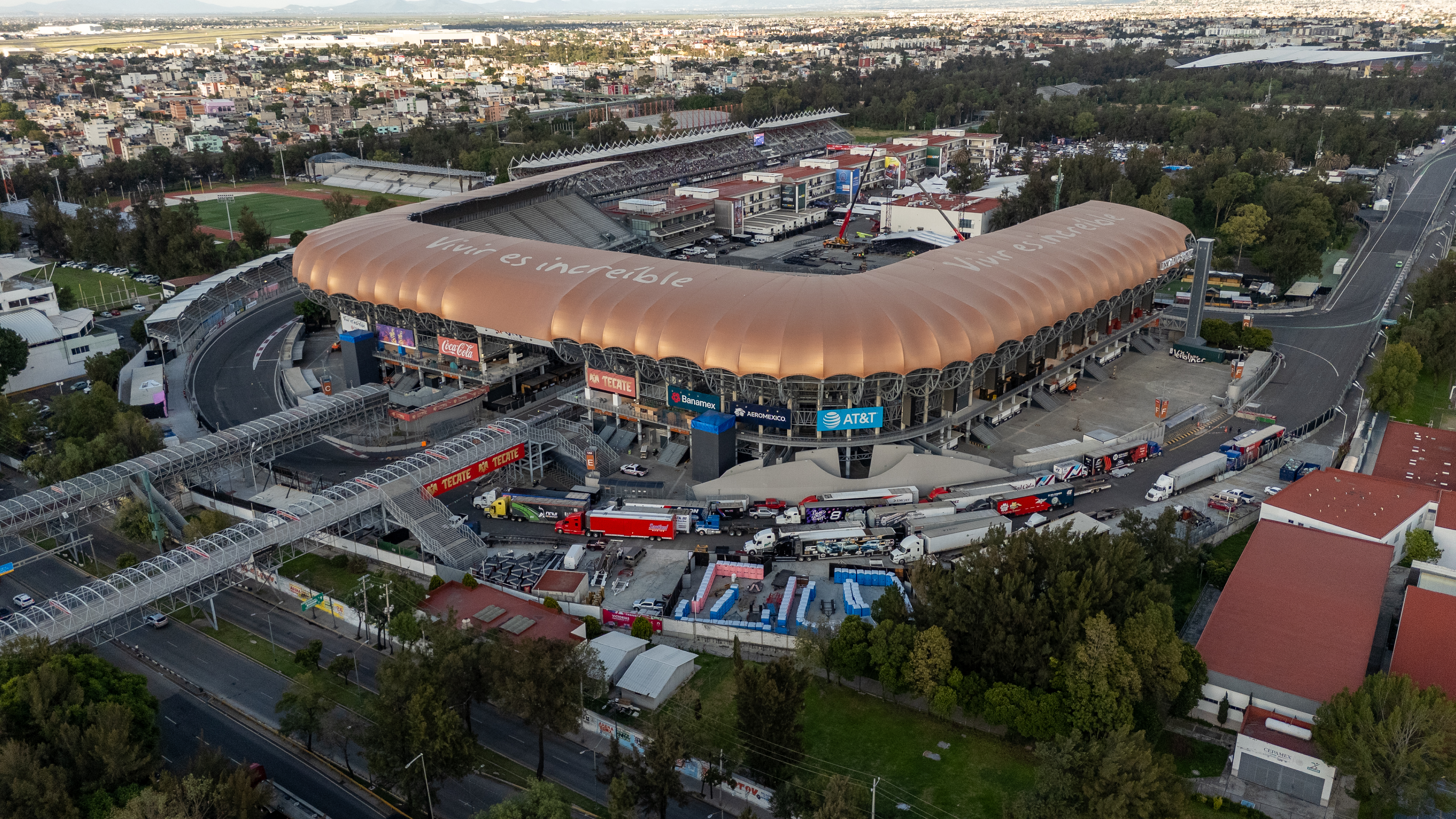
- Aerial shot of Estadio GNP showing the main stands.
- Interactive map of Estadio GNP Seguros
- Location: Av. Viaducto Río Piedad y Río Churubusco s/n Col. Granjas México, Iztacalco, C.P. 08400; Mexico City, Mexico
- Coordinates: 19°24′17.6″N 99°5′45.4″W
- Owner: Mexico City Government
- Operator: Grupo CIE
- Capacity: Baseball: 25,000; Concerts: 65,000
- Surface: FieldTurf
- Field size: Left Field: 326 feet (99 m); Center Field: 417 feet (127 m); Right Field: 333 feet (101 m)
- Public transit: Velódromo; Ciudad Deportiva

Construction
- Opened: 10 November 1993
- Renovated: 2024

Tenants
- Mexican Grand Prix (2015–present); Diablos Rojos del México (LMB) (2000–2014); Tigres de México (LMB) (2000–2001)

Estadio GNP Seguros, formerly known as Foro Sol, is a multipurpose stadium built in 1993 inside the Autódromo Hermanos Rodríguez in eastern Mexico City. It is located near the Mexico City International Airport and is operated by Grupo CIE.

The venue was originally built for staging large music concerts. Initially called the Autódromo, it could accommodate up to 50,000 people. From 2000 to 2014, it was used as a baseball stadium as well, hosting the Diablos Rojos del México and Tigres de México. The stadium is the second-largest concert venue in Mexico City; the largest, Estadio Azteca, has a capacity of 87,523.

== History ==
In 1993, four temporary stadium seatings were placed in the banked curve of the Autódromo Hermanos Rodríguez due to the lack of venues for large music concerts. The then-provisional field resulted as an agreement between Paul McCartney's manager, Barry Marshall, and Alejandro Soberón, the CEO of OCESA, after the concert usage of the Estadio Azteca was denied to the singer for a date on the New World Tour. Four years later, it was permanently built and renamed as Foro Sol, the name coming from a popular beer brand of the Cervecería Cuauhtémoc Moctezuma group that had purchased the naming rights of the venue.

Since 2015, the stadium hosts the Mexican Grand Prix and since 2016 the Mexico City ePrix, becoming part of the track and noted for its unique nature, increasing as well the circuit capacity by 25,000 spectators.

In 2019, the park hosted the Race of Champions and Stadium Super Trucks; the latter served as both a competing ROC category and standalone event to conclude its 2018 season.

On 14 and 15 June 2025, the stadium hosted races from NASCAR's Xfinity Series and Cup Series, marking the first time in six years that a top 3 division NASCAR race was held outside the United States and the first top 3 division race in Mexico since 2008.

It was announced in October 2023 that the stadium would close temporarily throughout most of 2024 for renovations. News surfaced in January 2024 that the venue would change its name from Foro Sol to Estadio GNP after the renovations, following a new deal between OCESA and GNP Seguros. The name change was announced officially on 18 June 2024.

== Usages ==
=== Baseball ===
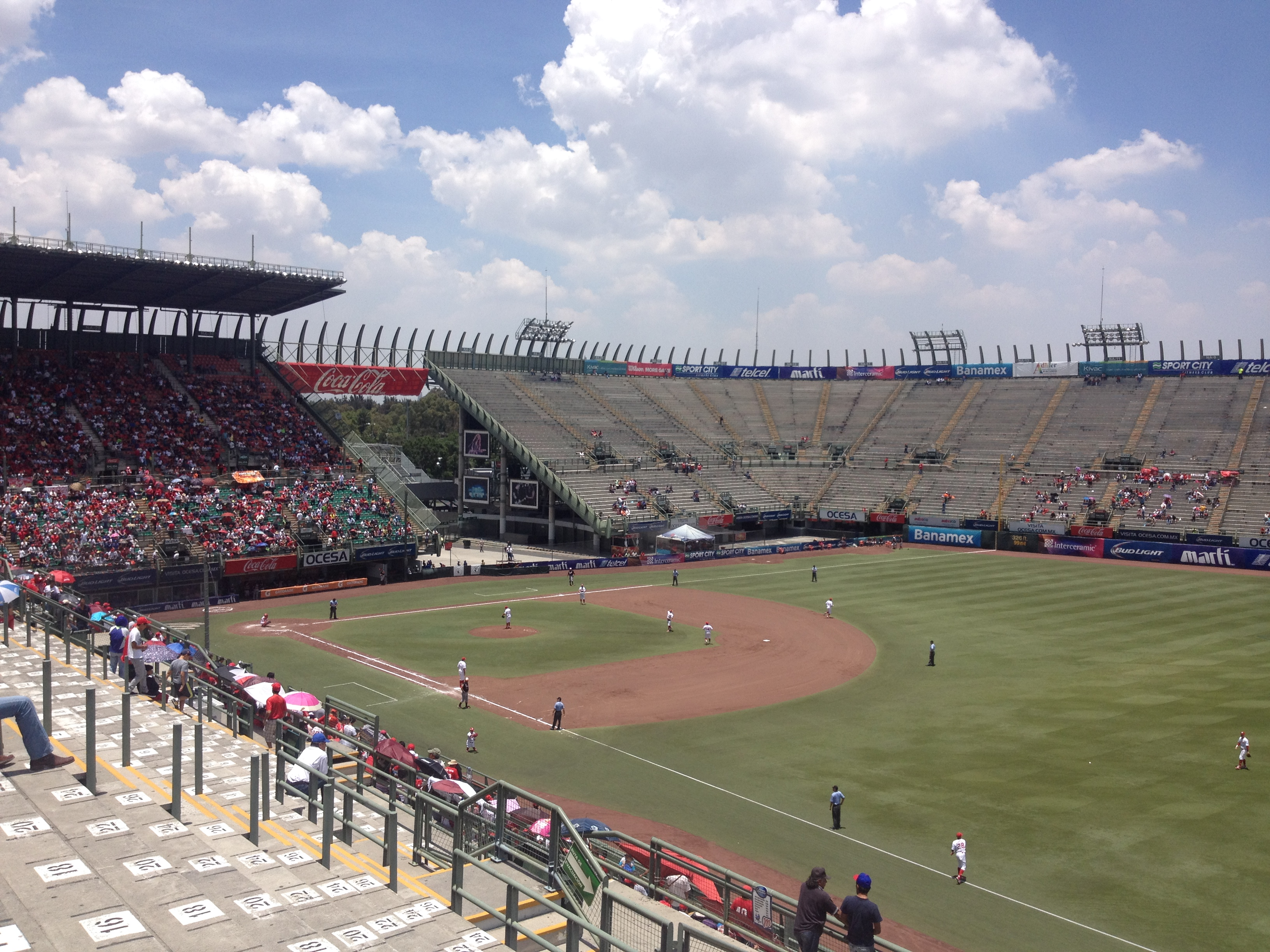
The stadium during a 2014 Diablos Rojos baseball game.

The stadium was inaugurated as a baseball park on 2 June 2000 with a match between the Tigres de México and the Diablos Rojos del México. Both teams had previously played in the Parque del Seguro Social, that was demolished in order to build a shopping mall. Tigres played the 2000 and 2001 seasons, winning the Mexican League championship back to back. The next year, Tigres moved to Puebla City and changed their name to Tigres de la Angelópolis and the Diablos Rojos remained as the park's only tenants. The venue was nicknamed Infierno Solar (Solar Hell) while the Diablos Rojos were the only tenants in it.

The ballpark hosted three Major League Baseball exhibition games: Pittsburgh Pirates vs. Tampa Bay Rays in 2001, New York Mets vs. Los Angeles Dodgers in 2003, and Florida Marlins vs. Houston Astros in 2004. Foro Sol hosted as well the Pool B of the 2009 World Baseball Classic contested by Australia, Cuba, South Africa, and Mexico.

In 2014, due to the return of the Mexican Grand Prix to the Autódromo Hermanos Rodríguez, Diablos Rojos played their last season at the stadium, since the venue needed renovations in order to host Formula 1. Diablos Rojos moved to the smaller Estadio Fray Nano.

=== Motorsport ===
The stadium has been a prominent part of the Formula One Mexican Grand Prix since the country returned to the race calendar in 2015, with the final sector of the circuit running through and around it. The podium is also contained within the stadium area, with the many fans joining in with the celebrations at the conclusion of each grand prix.

Formula E also races on the site in an alternate track configuration. Beginning in 2025, the stadium will also be used as part of a NASCAR race at the circuit.

=== Music ===
==== Notable concerts ====
Madonna was the first act to perform at the venue for her first visit to Mexico with The Girlie Show on 10, 12 and 13 November 1993, when it was still called the Autódromo Hermanos Rodríguez. British alternative rock band Coldplay performed at the stadium on 3, 4, 6, and 7 April 2022. These four shows made the band the first international group in history to perform four shows on a single tour, as well as the biggest attendance in the stadium's history for an English speaking act, with 259,591 spectators.

During his farewell tour, Puerto Rican rapper Daddy Yankee performed five shows on 29 and 30 November, 2, 3, and 4 December 2022, with 322,028 attendees overall. He became the first act to achieve five consecutive nights and the biggest attendance gathered at the venue. American singer Taylor Swift performed four consecutive shows on the 24, 25, 26 and 27 August 2023 as part of The Eras Tour, making her the first female artist to ever schedule four shows in a single tour at the stadium.

Mexican group RBD became the act with the most shows performed at the venue, with a six total show run during their reunion tour on 30 November, 1, 2, 3, 16 and 17 December 2023. Colombian singer Shakira performed seven consecutive shows on 19, 21, 23, 25, 27, 28 and 30 March 2025 with Las Mujeres Ya No Lloran World Tour, making her the first act to ever schedule seven dates in a single tour at the stadium. She then scheduled six more concerts on 26, 27, 29, 30 August and 18 September of the same year, and on 27 February 2026, totalling a thirteen-show residency. Puerto Rican rapper Bad Bunny performed at the venue during his Debí Tirar Más Fotos World Tour on 10, 11, 12, 15, 16, 19, 20 and 21 December 2025, becoming the first act to schedule eight consecutive shows.

==== Music festivals ====
The stadium is the host of Vive Latino, an annual multi-day rock music festival. It is one of the most important rock en español music festivals in the world, featuring a great variety of Mexican, Latin and Spanish groups of many genres, including performances of bands like Café Tacuba, Los Fabulosos Cadillacs, Gustavo Cerati, Ozomatli, Sepultura, Ska-P, and non-Spanish speaking bands like The Wailers, Jane's Addiction, Deftones, The Chemical Brothers, and The Mars Volta. The festival has also hosted many Lucha Libre AAA Worldwide pro wrestling events as well.

The venue was the host of The World is a Vampire music festival on 4 March 2023 which was included performances by The Smashing Pumpkins, Interpol, Peter Hook and the Light, Turnstile, Chelsea Wolfe, Margaritas Podridas, Ekkstacy, El Shirota, Deafhaven, In the Valley Below, and Acid Waves. The festival also featured a supercard wrestling show featuring wrestlers from Lucha Libre AAA Worldwide and the National Wrestling Alliance (NWA). The show was taped and aired on YouTube.

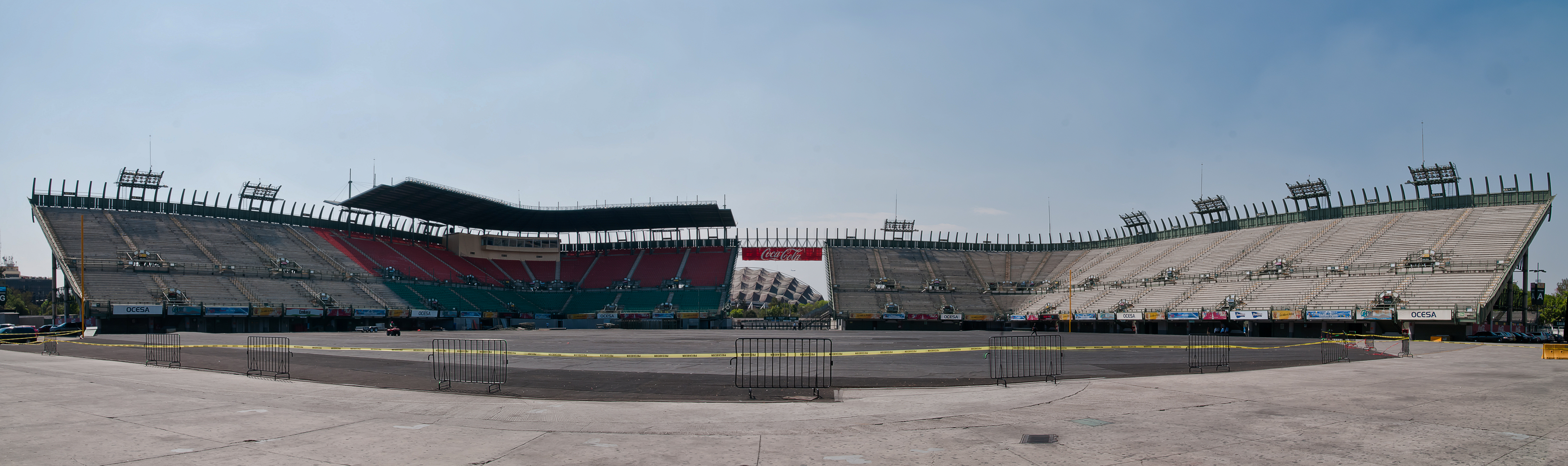
Panorama of the venue in 2011

==== List of concerts at Estadio GNP Seguros ====
Concerts at Estadio GNP Seguros
Date	Headlining Artist	Concert or Tour	Attendance
10 November 1993	Madonna	The Girlie Show	137,234
12 November 1993	Madonna	The Girlie Show	137,234
13 November 1993	Madonna	The Girlie Show	137,234
25 November 1993	Paul McCartney	The New World Tour	101,910
27 November 1993	Paul McCartney	The New World Tour	101,910
9 April 1994	Pink Floyd	The Division Bell Tour	90,476
10 April 1994	Pink Floyd	The Division Bell Tour	90,476
14 January 1995	The Rolling Stones	Voodoo Lounge Tour	204,020
16 January 1995	The Rolling Stones	Voodoo Lounge Tour	204,020
18 January 1995	The Rolling Stones	Voodoo Lounge Tour	204,020
20 January 1995	The Rolling Stones	Voodoo Lounge Tour	204,020
23 October 1997	David Bowie	Earthling Tour	—
2 December 1997	U2	PopMart Tour	106,966
3 December 1997	U2	PopMart Tour	106,966
7 February 1998	The Rolling Stones	Bridges to Babylon Tour	88,700
9 February 1998	The Rolling Stones	Bridges to Babylon Tour	88,700
26 February 2000	Ricky Martin	Livin' la Vida Loca Tour	54,431
9 January 2001	Iron Maiden	Brave New World Tour	—
23 March 2001	Backstreet Boys	Black & Blue Tour	—
24 March 2001	Backstreet Boys	Black & Blue Tour	—
25 March 2001	Backstreet Boys	Black & Blue Tour	—
19 October 2001	Eric Clapton	Reptile World Tour	—
19 March 2002	Roger Waters	In the Flesh	—
27, 28 July 2002	Britney Spears	Dream Within a Dream Tour	102,522
28 July 2002	Britney Spears	Dream Within a Dream Tour	102,522
5 October 2002	Rush	Vapor Trails Tour	—
14 February 2003	Shakira	Tour of the Mongoose	88,163
15 February 2003	Shakira	Tour of the Mongoose	88,163
26 February 2006	The Rolling Stones	A Bigger Bang Tour	—
4 May 2006	Depeche Mode	Touring the Angel	105,040
5 May 2006	Depeche Mode	Touring the Angel	105,040
21 October 2006	Robbie Williams	Close Encounters Tour	102,956
22 October 2006	Robbie Williams	Close Encounters Tour	102,956
6 March 2007	Roger Waters	The Dark Side of the Moon Live	54,344
22 April 2007	Aerosmith	World Tour 2007	64,000
13 May 2007	Shakira	Oral Fixation Tour	48,491
27 May 2007	High School Musical Cast	High School Musical: The Concert	35,139
6 October 2007	Heroes del Silencio	Tour 2007	—
7 October 2007	Heroes del Silencio	Tour 2007	—
16 November 2007	Soda Stereo	Me Verás Volver	—
27 November 2007	The Police	The Police Reunion Tour	47,027
28 November 2007	The Police	The Police Reunion Tour	47,027
12 December 2007	Billy Joel	2007 World	—
18 January 2008	Tiësto	Elements of Life World Tour	—
24 February 2008	Iron Maiden	Somewhere Back in Time World Tour	—
29 November 2008	Madonna	Sticky & Sweet Tour	104,270
30 November 2008	Madonna	Sticky & Sweet Tour	104,270
20 December 2008	Jonas Brothers	Burnin' Up Tour	—
26 February 2009	Iron Maiden	Somewhere Back in Time World Tour	—
4 June 2009	Metallica	World Magnetic Tour	156,728
6 June 2009	Metallica	World Magnetic Tour	156,728
7 June 2009	Metallica	World Magnetic Tour	156,728
3 October 2009	Depeche Mode	Tour of the Universe	88,380
4 October 2009	Depeche Mode	Tour of the Universe	88,380
12 November 2009	AC/DC	Black Ice World Tour	50,853
20 April 2010	Muse	The Resistance Tour	—
6 March 2010	Coldplay	Viva la Vida Tour	94,005
7 March 2010	Coldplay	Viva la Vida Tour	94,005
27 May 2010	Paul McCartney	Up and Coming Tour	110,000
28 May 2011	Paul McCartney	Up and Coming Tour	110,000
24 September 2010	Bon Jovi	The Circle Tour	44,124
24 October 2010	Jonas Brothers	Live in Concert World Tour	42,500
18 March 2011	Iron Maiden	The Final Frontier World Tour	47,489
2 April 2011	Shakira	The Sun Comes Out World Tour	54,000
3 April 2011	Shakira	The Sun Comes Out World Tour	54,000
5 May 2011	Lady Gaga	The Monster Ball Tour	111,060
6 May 2011	Lady Gaga	The Monster Ball Tour	111,060
26 May 2011	Miley Cyrus	Gypsy Heart Tour	31,200
1 October 2011	Justin Bieber	My World Tour	94,449
2 October 2011	Justin Bieber	My World Tour	94,449
8 November 2011	Aerosmith	Back on the Road Tour	58,000
24 November 2011	Pearl Jam	Pearl Jam Twenty Tour	—
3 December 2011	Britney Spears	Femme Fatale Tour	57,000
27 April 2012	Roger Waters	The Wall Live	82,811
28 April 2012	Roger Waters	The Wall Live	82,811
29 September 2012	Kiss; Mötley Crüe	The Tour	—
26 October 2012	Lady Gaga	Born This Way Ball	37,260
24 November 2012	Madonna	The MDNA Tour	84,382
25 November 2012	Madonna	The MDNA Tour	84,382
9 February 2013	Swedish House Mafia	One Last Tour	36,657
13 April 2013	The Killers	Battle Born World Tour	56,375
8 June 2013	One Direction	Take Me Home Tour	108,050
9 June 2013	One Direction	Take Me Home Tour	108,050
17 September 2013	Iron Maiden	Maiden England World Tour	49,332
29 September 2013	Bon Jovi	Because We Can	35,222
18 November 2013	Justin Bieber	Believe Tour	98,358
19 November 2013	Justin Bieber	Believe Tour	98,358
11 December 2013	Foo Fighters	Wasting Light Tour	35,222
8 November 2014	Zoé	Gira Programatón	40,000
14 February 2015	Romeo Santos	Formula, Vol. 2 Tour	48,298
28 November 2015	Pearl Jam	Pearl Jam 2015 Latin America Tour	60,106
29 February 2016	Maroon 5	Maroon V Tour	117,296
1 March 2016	Maroon 5	Maroon V Tour	117,296
14 March 2016	The Rolling Stones	América Latina Olé Tour 2016	117,567
17 March 2016	The Rolling Stones	América Latina Olé Tour 2016	117,567
15 April 2016	Coldplay	A Head Full of Dreams Tour	195,192
16 April 2016	Coldplay	A Head Full of Dreams Tour	195,192
17 April 2016	Coldplay	A Head Full of Dreams Tour	195,192
19 April 2016	Guns N' Roses	Not in This Lifetime... Tour	131,198
20 April 2016	Guns N' Roses	Not in This Lifetime... Tour	131,198
28 September 2016	Roger Waters	—	118,594
29 September 2016	Roger Waters	—	118,594
16 November 2016	Black Sabbath	The End Tour	60,506
18 February 2017	Justin Bieber	Purpose World Tour	155,201
19 February 2017	Justin Bieber	Purpose World Tour	155,201
21 February 2017	Justin Bieber	Purpose World Tour	155,201
1 March 2017	Metallica	WorldWired Tour	197,745
3 March 2017	Metallica	WorldWired Tour	197,745
5 March 2017	Metallica	WorldWired Tour	197,745
3 October 2017	U2	The Joshua Tree Tour 2017	117,098
4 October 2017	U2	The Joshua Tree Tour 2017	117,098
2 February 2018	Bruno Mars	24K Magic World Tour	115,147
3 February 2018	Bruno Mars	24K Magic World Tour	115,147
11 March 2018	Depeche Mode	Global Spirit Tour	128,521
13 March 2018	Depeche Mode	Global Spirit Tour	128,521
6 April 2018	The Killers	Wonderful Wonderful World Tour	64,094
18 June 2018	Romeo Santos	Golden Tour	—
24 March 2019	Arctic Monkeys	Tranquility Base Hotel & Casino Tour	64,467
18 May 2019	Swedish House Mafia	Save the World Reunion Tour	—
2 October 2019	Muse	Simulation Theory World Tour	94,400
3 October 2019	Muse	Simulation Theory World Tour	94,400
6 March 2020	Billy Joel	Billy Joel in Concert	45,645
19 November 2021	Armin van Buuren	A State of Trance	—
10 December 2021	Panteón Rococó	25° Aniversario	—
11 December 2021	Panteón Rococó	25° Aniversario	—
12 December 2021	Panteón Rococó	25° Aniversario	—
15 March 2022	Foo Fighters	—	54,800
24 March 2022	Grupo Firme	Enfiestados y Amanecidos Tour	190,004
25 March 2022	Grupo Firme	Enfiestados y Amanecidos Tour	190,004
26 March 2022	Grupo Firme	Enfiestados y Amanecidos Tour	190,004
30 March 2022	Maroon 5	World Tour 2022	—
3 April 2022	Coldplay	Music of the Spheres World Tour	259,591
4 April 2022	Coldplay	Music of the Spheres World Tour	259,591
6 April 2022	Coldplay	Music of the Spheres World Tour	259,591
7 April 2022	Coldplay	Music of the Spheres World Tour	259,591
29 April 2022	The Killers	Imploding the Mirage Tour	64,511
6 May 2022	Grupo Firme	Enfiestados y Amanecidos Tour	111,452
7 May 2022	Grupo Firme	Enfiestados y Amanecidos Tour	111,452
19 May 2022	The Strokes	—	53,000
25 May 2022	Justin Bieber	Justice World Tour	112,747
26 May 2022	Justin Bieber	Justice World Tour	112,747
7 September 2022	Iron Maiden	Legacy of the Beast World Tour	62,994
21 September 2022	Dua Lipa	Future Nostalgia Tour	64,267
1 October 2022	Rammstein	Stadium Tour	193,990
2 October 2022	Rammstein	Stadium Tour	193,990
4 October 2022	Rammstein	Stadium Tour	193,990
12 November 2022	Maná	México Lindo y Querido Tour	—
24 November 2022	Harry Styles	Love On Tour	117,363
25 November 2022	Harry Styles	Love On Tour	117,363
29 November 2022	Daddy Yankee	La Última Vuelta World Tour	322,028
30 November 2022	Daddy Yankee	La Última Vuelta World Tour	322,028
2 December 2022	Daddy Yankee	La Última Vuelta World Tour	322,028
3 December 2022	Daddy Yankee	La Última Vuelta World Tour	322,028
4 December 2022	Daddy Yankee	La Última Vuelta World Tour	322,028
22 January 2023	Muse	Will of the People World Tour	107,270
23 January 2023	Muse	Will of the People World Tour	107,270
10 February 2023	Grupo Firme	Enfiestados y Amanecidos Tour	—
18 February 2023	Mötley Crüe; Def Leppard	The World Tour	—
19 March 2023	Red Hot Chili Peppers	Global Stadium Tour	—
25 March 2023	Ricardo Arjona	Blanco y Negro Tour	—
30 March 2023	Billie Eilish	Happier Than Ever, The World Tour	51,894
26 April 2023	Blackpink	Born Pink World Tour	113,498
27 April 2023	Blackpink	Born Pink World Tour	113,498
6 May 2023	Rels B	Flakk Tour 2023	—
2 May 2023	Molotov	Estalla Molotov	—
17 May 2023	Imagine Dragons	Mercury World Tour	—
20 May 2023	Rauw Alejandro	Saturno World Tour	—
24 May 2023	Wisin & Yandel	La Última Misión World Tour	—
27 May 2023	Christian Nodal	Foraji2 Tour	—
15 August 2023	Lana Del Rey	2023-2024 Tour	116,723
16 August 2023	Lana Del Rey	2023-2024 Tour	116,723
24 August 2023	Taylor Swift	The Eras Tour	180,000
25 August 2023	Taylor Swift	The Eras Tour	180,000
26 August 2023	Taylor Swift	The Eras Tour	180,000
27 August 2023	Taylor Swift	The Eras Tour	180,000
5 September 2023	Post Malone	If Y'all Weren't Here, I'd Be Crying	—
21 September 2023	Depeche Mode	Memento Mori World Tour	200,000
23 September 2023	Depeche Mode	Memento Mori World Tour	200,000
25 September 2023	Depeche Mode	Memento Mori World Tour	200,000
29 September 2023	The Weeknd	After Hours til Dawn Tour	129,707
30 September 2023	The Weeknd	After Hours til Dawn Tour	129,707
6 October 2023	Arctic Monkeys	The Car Tour	—
7 October 2023	Arctic Monkeys	The Car Tour	—
11 November 2023	Peso Pluma	Tour México	55,925
14 November 2023	Paul McCartney	Got Back	118,088
16 November 2023	Paul McCartney	Got Back	118,088
23 November 2023	Junior H	Tour 2023	—
30 November 2023	RBD	Soy Rebelde Tour	347,923
1 December 2023	RBD	Soy Rebelde Tour	347,923
2 December 2023	RBD	Soy Rebelde Tour	347,923
3 December 2023	RBD	Soy Rebelde Tour	347,923
16 December 2023	RBD	Soy Rebelde Tour	347,923
17 December 2023	RBD	Soy Rebelde Tour	347,923
9 December 2023	Siddhartha	—	—
2 February 2024	Twice	Ready to Be World Tour	114,049
3 February 2024	Twice	Ready to Be World Tour	114,049
8 August 2024	Bruno Mars	Bruno Mars Live	174,000
10 August 2024	Bruno Mars	Bruno Mars Live	174,000
11 August 2024	Bruno Mars	Bruno Mars Live	174,000
20 August 2024	Feid	Ferxxocalipsis World Tour	—
21 August 2024	Feid	Ferxxocalipsis World Tour	—
23 August 2024	Natanael Cano	Tumbado Tour 2024	—
20 September 2024	Metallica	M72 World Tour	254,000
22 September 2024	Metallica	M72 World Tour	254,000
27 September 2024	Metallica	M72 World Tour	254,000
29 September 2024	Metallica	M72 World Tour	254,000
3 October 2024	Eric Clapton	—	—
5 October 2024	The Killers	Rebel Diamonds Tour	—
6 October 2024	The Killers	Rebel Diamonds Tour	—
9 November 2024	Blink-182	World Tour 2023/2024	—
12 November 2024	Paul McCartney	Got Back	—
14 November 2024	Paul McCartney	Got Back	—
20 November 2024	Iron Maiden	The Future Past World Tour	—
30 November 2024	Luis Miguel	Tour 2023-2024	—
1 December 2024	Luis Miguel	Tour 2023-2024	—
7 December 2024	Carín León	Boca Chueca Tour	—
13 December 2024	Morat	Los Estadios Tour	—
14 December 2024	Morat	Los Estadios Tour	—
31 January 2025	Linkin Park	From Zero World Tour	64,400
20 February 2025	Twenty One Pilots	The Clancy World Tour	—
19 March 2025	Shakira	Las Mujeres Ya No Lloran World Tour	396,000
21 March 2025	Shakira	Las Mujeres Ya No Lloran World Tour	396,000
23 March 2025	Shakira	Las Mujeres Ya No Lloran World Tour	396,000
25 March 2025	Shakira	Las Mujeres Ya No Lloran World Tour	396,000
27 March 2025	Shakira	Las Mujeres Ya No Lloran World Tour	396,000
28 March 2025	Shakira	Las Mujeres Ya No Lloran World Tour	396,000
30 March 2025	Shakira	Las Mujeres Ya No Lloran World Tour	396,000
2 April 2025	Olivia Rodrigo	Guts World Tour	114,168
3 April 2025	Olivia Rodrigo	Guts World Tour	114,168
12 April 2025	Stray Kids	Dominate World Tour	—
13 April 2025	Stray Kids	Dominate World Tour	—
26 April 2025	Lady Gaga	Long Live Mayhem	117,174
27 April 2025	Lady Gaga	Long Live Mayhem	117,174
9 May 2025	Exo; Key; Minho; Kai; Chanyeol; Suho; NCT 127; WayV; NCT Dream; NCT Wish; Red Velvet; Aespa; Riize; Hearts2Hearts; DearALICE; Super Junior; SMTR25; TVXQ!	SM Town Live 2025: The Culture, the Future	50,000
26 July 2025	Fuerza Regida	Esto No Es Un Tour	—
23 August 2025	Ateez	2025 World Tour: In Your Fantasy	—
26 August 2025	Shakira	Las Mujeres Ya No Lloran World Tour	272,427
27 August 2025	Shakira	Las Mujeres Ya No Lloran World Tour	272,427
29 August 2025	Shakira	Las Mujeres Ya No Lloran World Tour	272,427
30 August 2025	Shakira	Las Mujeres Ya No Lloran World Tour	272,427
18 September 2025	Shakira	Las Mujeres Ya No Lloran World Tour	272,427
12 September 2025	Oasis	Live '25	—
13 September 2025	Oasis	Live '25	—
23 September 2025	Kendrick Lamar	Grand National Tour	—
27 September 2025	Zoé	Memorex + Rexsexex	240,000
28 September 2025	Zoé	Memorex + Rexsexex	240,000
1 October 2025	Zoé	Memorex + Rexsexex	240,000
2 October 2025	Zoé	Memorex + Rexsexex	240,000
8 November 2025	Guns N’ Roses	Because What You Want & What You Get Are Two Completely Different Things Tour	—
1 December 2025	Dua Lipa	Radical Optimism Tour	192,000
2 December 2025	Dua Lipa	Radical Optimism Tour	192,000
5 December 2025	Dua Lipa	Radical Optimism Tour	192,000
10 December 2025	Bad Bunny	Debí Tirar Más Fotos World Tour	517,736
11 December 2025	Bad Bunny	Debí Tirar Más Fotos World Tour	517,736
12 December 2025	Bad Bunny	Debí Tirar Más Fotos World Tour	517,736
15 December 2025	Bad Bunny	Debí Tirar Más Fotos World Tour	517,736
16 December 2025	Bad Bunny	Debí Tirar Más Fotos World Tour	517,736
19 December 2025	Bad Bunny	Debí Tirar Más Fotos World Tour	517,736
20 December 2025	Bad Bunny	Debí Tirar Más Fotos World Tour	517,736
21 December 2025	Bad Bunny	Debí Tirar Más Fotos World Tour	517,736
13 February 2026	My Chemical Romance	The Black Parade 2026	—
14 February 2026	My Chemical Romance	The Black Parade 2026	—
27 February 2026	Shakira	Las Mujeres Ya No Lloran World Tour	—
7 April 2026	AC/DC	Power Up Tour	—
11 April 2026	AC/DC	Power Up Tour	—
15 April 2026	AC/DC	Power Up Tour	—
20 April 2026	The Weeknd	After Hours til Dawn Tour	—
21 April 2026	The Weeknd	After Hours til Dawn Tour	—
22 April 2026	The Weeknd	After Hours til Dawn Tour	—
7 May 2026	BTS	Arirang World Tour	146,000
9 May 2026	BTS	Arirang World Tour	146,000
10 May 2026	BTS	Arirang World Tour	146,000
20 June 2026	Zayn Malik	The Konnakol Tour	—
31 July 2026	Harry Styles	Together, Together	—
1 August 2026	Harry Styles	Together, Together	—
4 August 2026	Harry Styles	Together, Together	—
7 August 2026	Harry Styles	Together, Together	—
8 August 2026	Harry Styles	Together, Together	—
10 August 2026	Harry Styles	Together, Together	—
2 October 2026	Iron Maiden	Run for Your Lives World Tour	—
13 November 2026	Karol G	Viajando Por El Mundo Tropitour	—
14 November 2026	Karol G	Viajando Por El Mundo Tropitour	—
15 November 2026	Karol G	Viajando Por El Mundo Tropitour	—
3 December 2026	Bruno Mars	The Romantic Tour	—
4 December 2026	Bruno Mars	The Romantic Tour	—
7 December 2026	Bruno Mars	The Romantic Tour	—
8 December 2026	Bruno Mars	The Romantic Tour	—
5 February 2027	The Warning	Everything's Falling Tour	—
23 February 2027	U2	The Greatest Show on Earth World Tour	—
26 February 2027	U2	The Greatest Show on Earth World Tour	—
28 February 2027	U2	The Greatest Show on Earth World Tour	—
2 March 2027	U2	The Greatest Show on Earth World Tour	—
10 April 2027	Louis Tomlinson	How Did We Get Here? Latin America Tour	—

== Accolades ==
Awards and nominations for the venue
Organization	Year	Category	Result	Ref.
Pollstar Awards	2025	New Concert Venue of the Year (International) (Note: Nomination received due to 2024 renovations and naming rights change.)	Nominated	
Pollstar Awards	2025	Stadium of the Year (Outside the U.S.)	Nominated	
Pollstar Awards	2026	Stadium of the Year (Outside the U.S.)	Nominated	

== Gallery ==
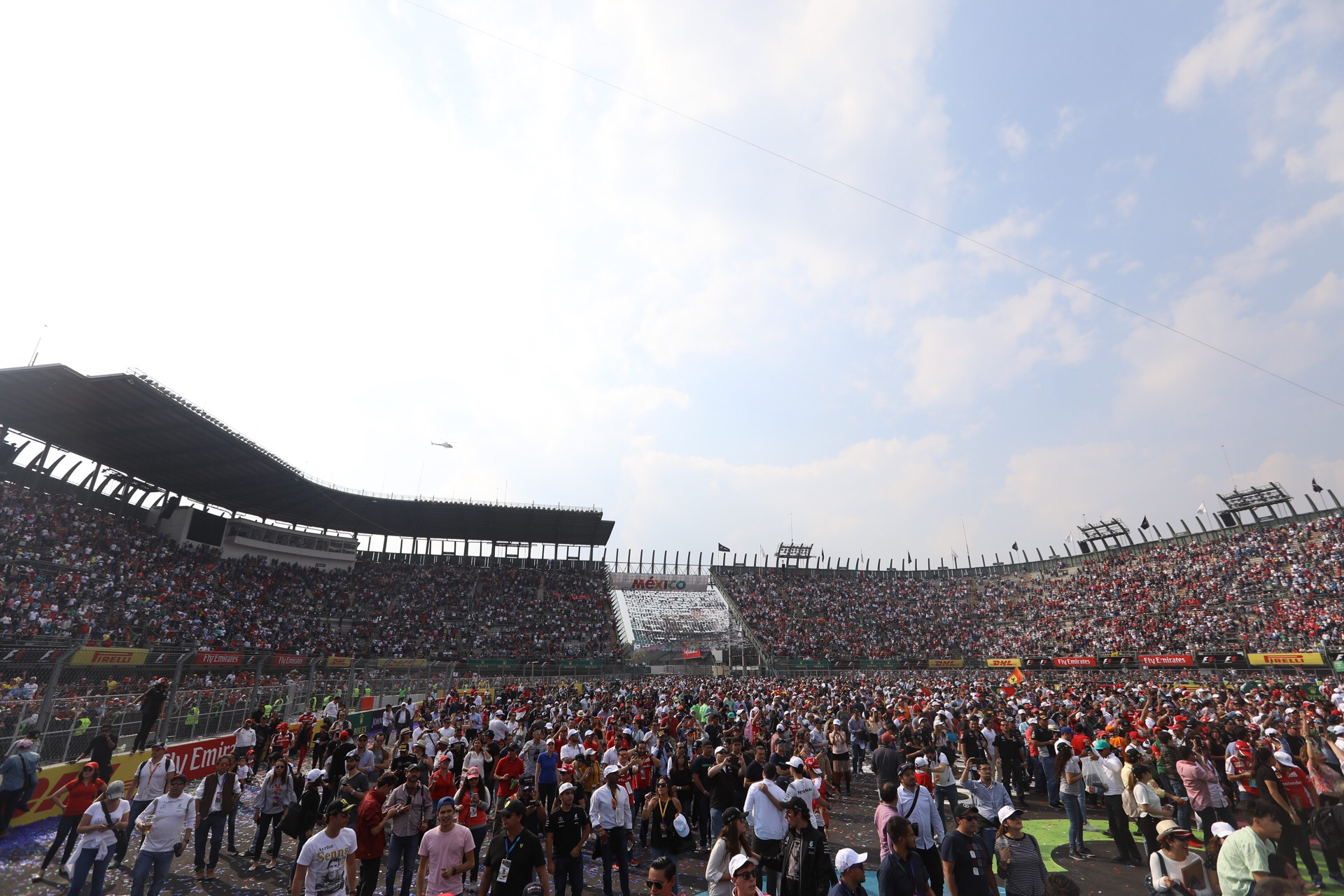
Formula 1 2017.

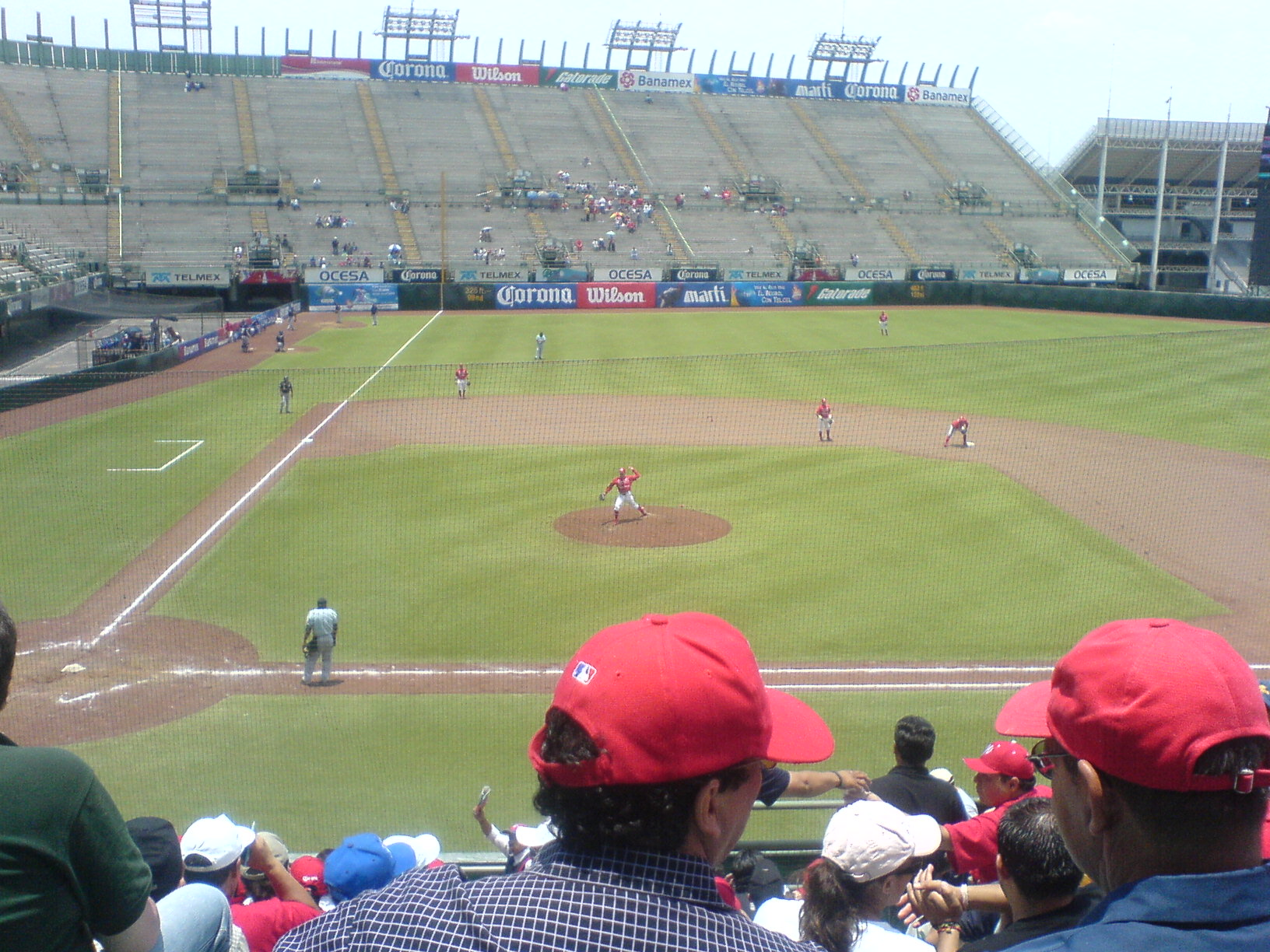
Baseball game between Diablos Rojos del México and Rieleros de Aguascalientes.

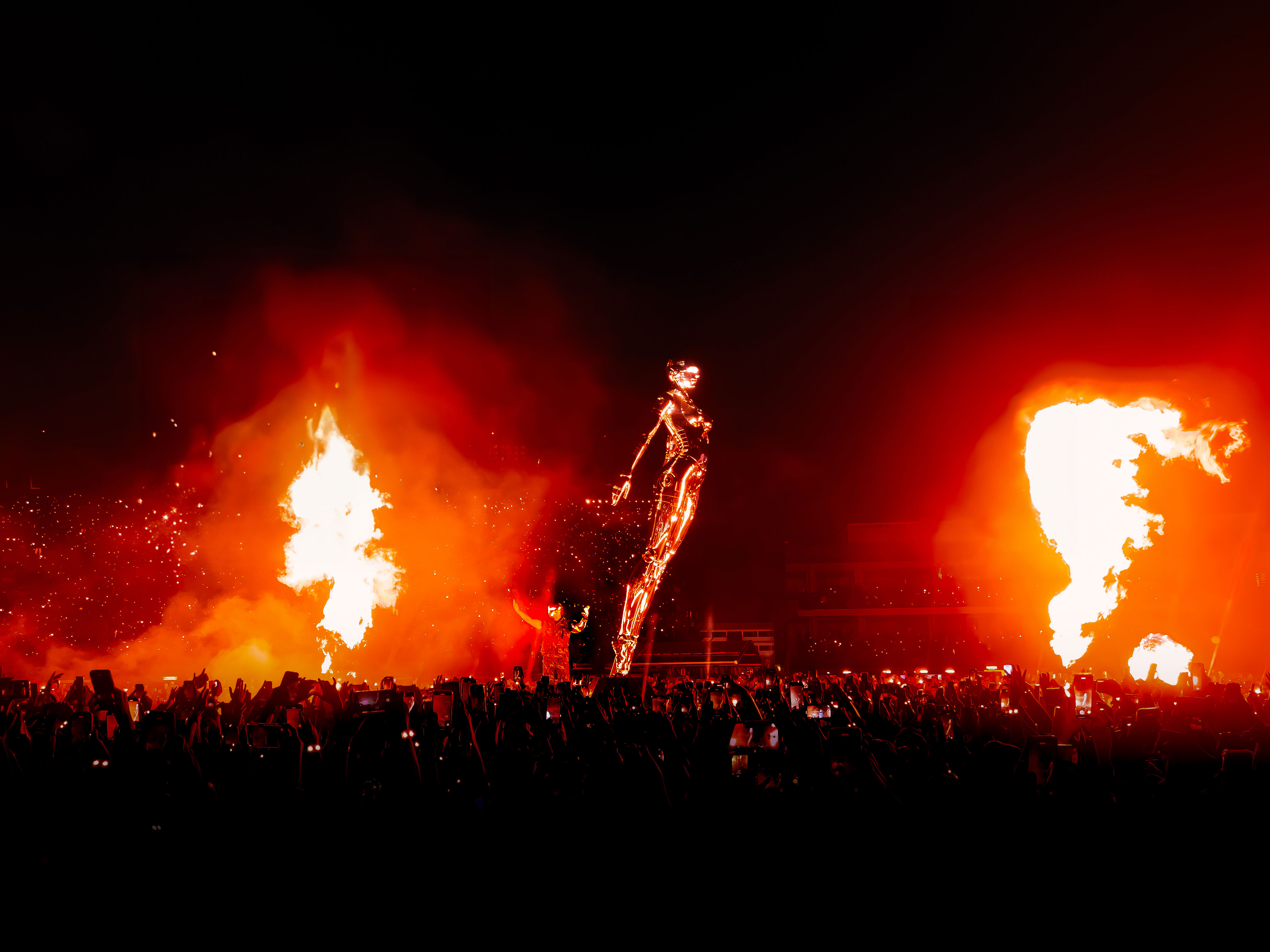
The Weeknd in concert in 2023.

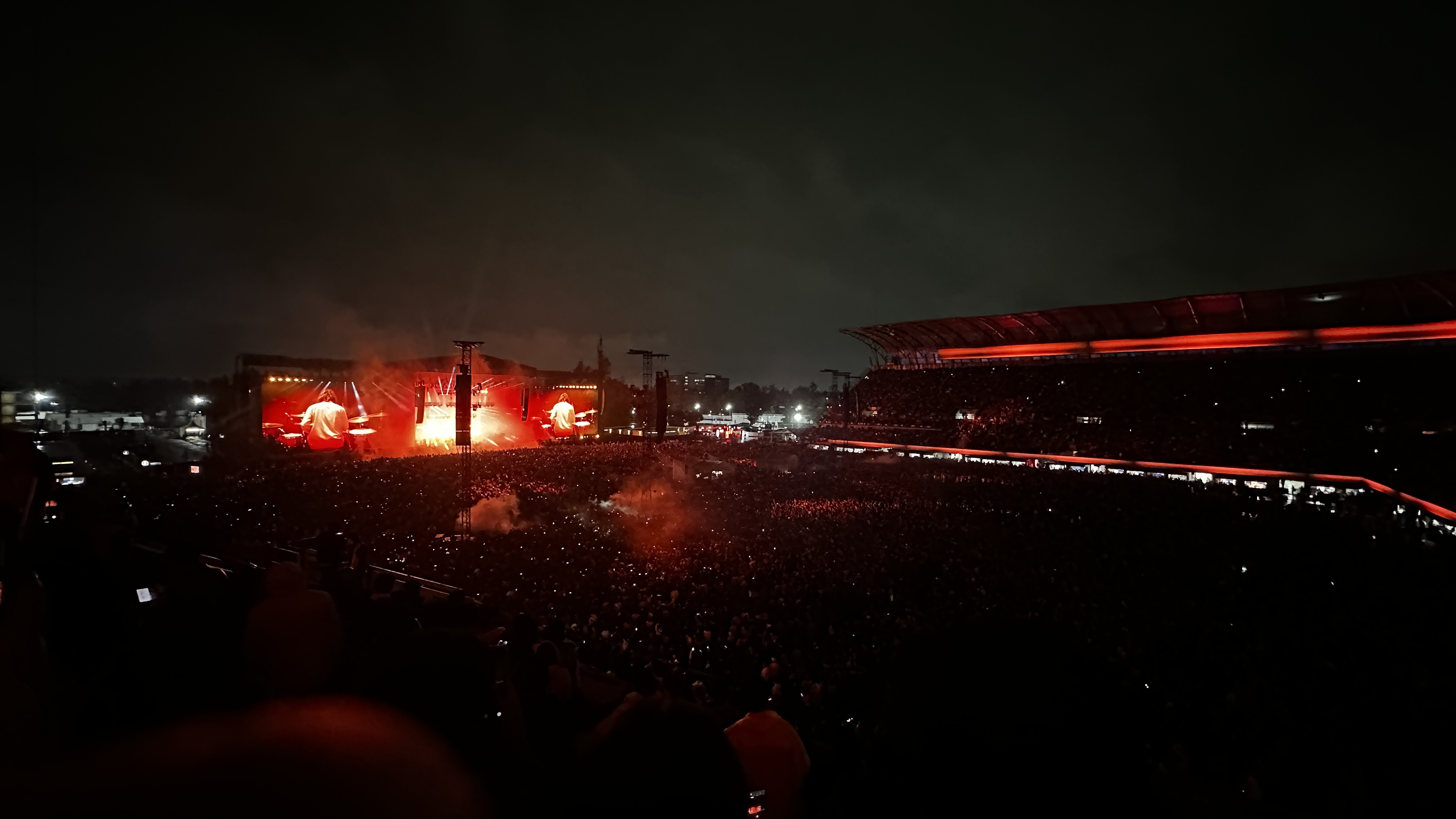
Zoé in concert on 27 September 2025
