= Tacubaya metro station =

Mexico City metro station

Tacubaya
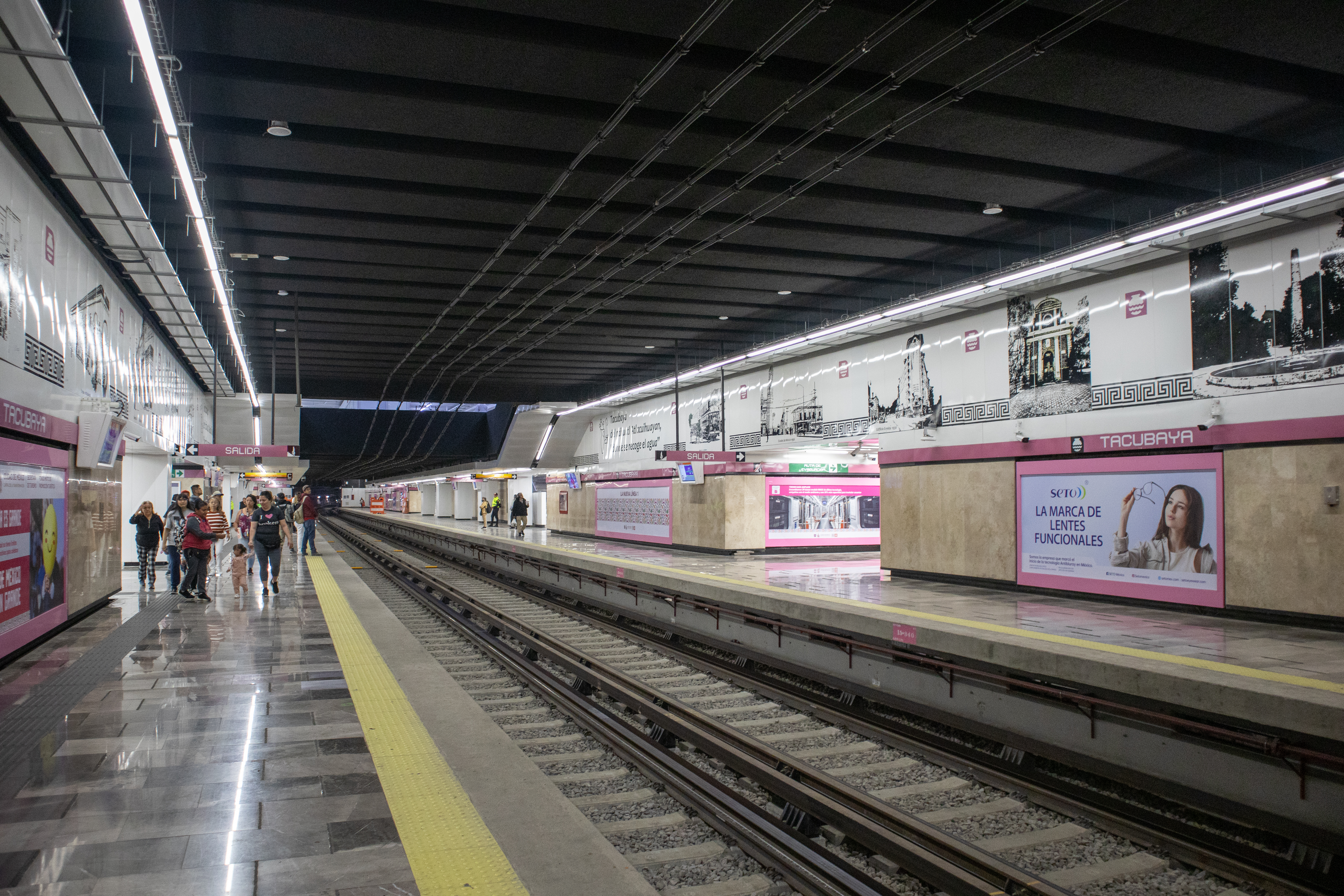
- Line 1 platforms

General information
- Location: Tacubaya, Miguel Hidalgo; Mexico City; Mexico
- Coordinates: 19.403439°N 99.187102°W
- System: Mexico City Metro
- Operator: Sistema de Transporte Colectivo (STC)
- Platforms: 6 side platforms
- Tracks: 6
- Connections: Tacubaya; Temporary Line 1 service: Tacubaya stop Tacubaya stop (temporary)

Construction
- Structure type: Underground
- Parking: No
- Cycle facilities: No
- Accessible: Partial

Other information
- Status: In service

History
- Opened: 20 November 1970; 55 years ago 23 August 1985; 41 years ago 29 August 1988; 37 years ago

Passengers
- 2025: Total: 24,468,717; 627,639 (Note: The data here is limited to the most recent ten years to avoid excessive listings; earlier figures can be found in this page's history or on the Mexico City Metro website. To calculate the average daily ridership, the annual total is divided by 365 days (366 in leap years), with decimals omitted from the result. Each station per line is ranked individually, as the system counts transfer stations separately. The percentage change is calculated automatically using the data from the current year and the previous year.); 2,240,669; 21,600,409 ▲4.66%
- Rank: 193/195; 173/195; 4/195

Services
Preceding station	Mexico City Metro	Following station
Observatorio Terminus	Line 1	Juanacatlán toward Pantitlán
Constituyentes toward El Rosario	Line 7	San Pedro de los Pinos toward Barranca del Muerto
Terminus	Line 9	Patriotismo toward Pantitlán
Route map
Location
- Location within Mexico City
- Area map and exits

Tacubaya is a station on Lines 1, 7 and 9 of the Mexico City Metro system. It is located in the Miguel Hidalgo borough, west of the city centre. In 2019, the station had a total average ridership of 85,800 passengers per day, making it the fifth busiest station in the network. From 2023 to 2025, the Line 1 station was closed for modernization work on the tunnel and the line's technical equipment.

== Name and pictogram ==
The station takes its name from the neighborhood it is located in: Tacubaya. The origin of this zone of the city can be traced back to an Aztec settlement, which back then was at the edge of Lake Texcoco. The name Tacubaya is a Spanish barbarism that derived from the Nahuatl Atlacuihuayan, that means "where water joins".

Therefore, the station pictogram represents a water bowl, that also resembles the glyph of the Aztec settlement of Tacubaya found at the Codex Mendoza.

== History ==
Service at this station began on 20 November 1970, when Line 1 was expanded westwards from Juanacatlán to Tacubaya. On 22 August 1985, Metro Tacubaya became a transfer station, when the second stretch of Line 7 was inaugurated, from Auditorio to Tacubaya. In 1988, Line 9 was connected to the station as part of the final stretch of Line 9, inaugurated on 29 August 1988, going from Centro Médico to Tacubaya, thus becoming the western terminus of the line.

According to earlier plans for the metro, Line 9 was supposed to be extended towards Observatorio. This is the reason why on Line 9 platforms of Tacubaya signs stating that the station is a provisional terminal can be seen since its opening in 1988. In 2018, the Sistema de Transporte Colectivo announced plans to complete this expansion from Tacubaya to Observatorio. Mexico City government announced shortly after that no works would be done during 2019; and as of early 2020, works still have not been started.

=== March 2020 train crash ===
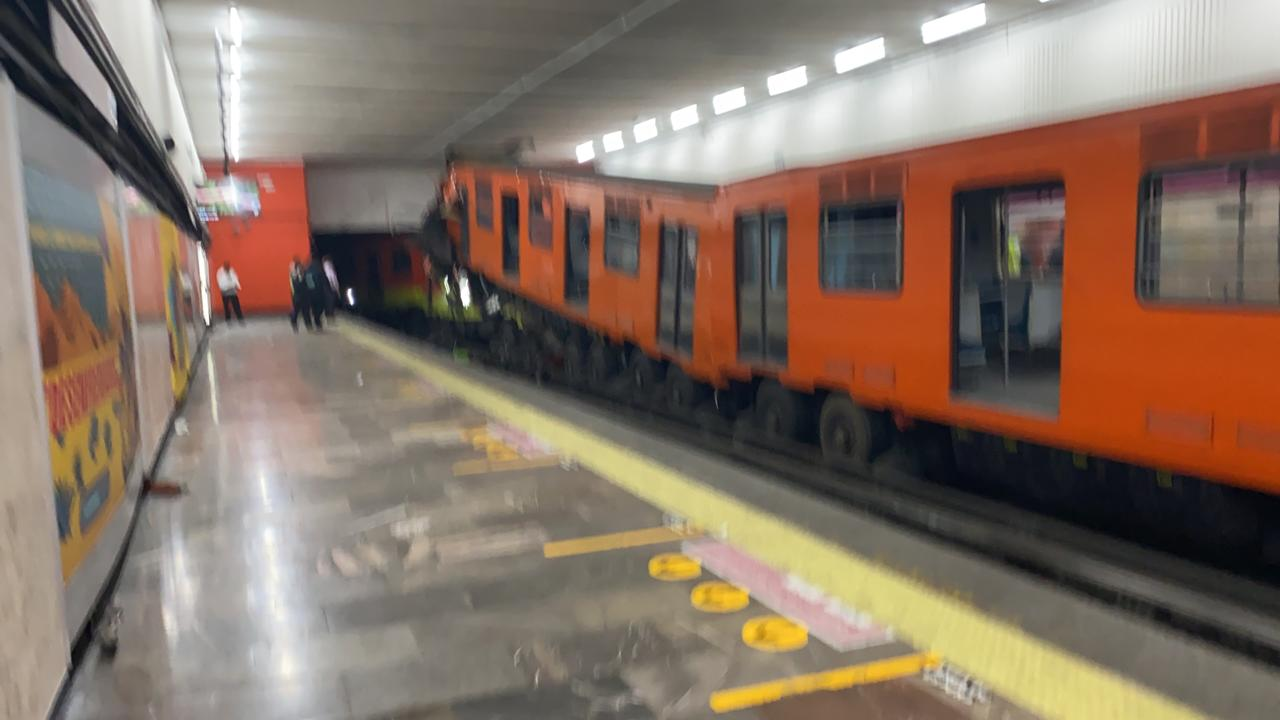
The accident

On March 10, 2020, at about 23:37 local time (05:37 GMT), two trains crashed while both were going towards Observatorio station. The first train, No. 38, was parked at Tacubaya's platform when it was hit by another train, No. 33, that came in reverse at 70 kilometers per hour (43 mph). According to official reports, 1 person died and 41 were injured, all inside train No. 33; people in train No. 38 were evacuated moments before the crash. Observatorio, Tacubaya and Juanacatlán stations were closed temporarily for repairs. Authorities from the Sistema Transporte Colectivo Metro believe the crash was caused due to a failure in the train systems coupled with a 7-degree slope that propelled train No. 33 for a kilometer (0.62 mi), that occurred after performing a parking maneuver at Observatorio station.

=== 2024 stabbing attack ===
On 19 November 2024, a man stabbed four people at the Line 7 platforms. The attacker was arrested.

== General information ==
The station was built on many levels, in order to accommodate the connecting lines. It has a maze of long, wide corridors between the lines' platforms, which are equipped with escalators. This station's exits connect with many zones of Tacubaya neighborhood, such as Parque Lira, a local market and the offices of the Miguel Hidalgo borough administration.

Metro Tacubaya has facilities for the handicapped, four cultural displays, as well as a medical module and a cyber center where users can access internet through a computer; both services are free. The mural Del códice al mural by Guillermo Ceniceros can be found inside the station in Line 1 platforms.

The station serves the neighborhood of the same name. It was in this area of Mexico City where the French pastry chef had his shop that was damaged in 1828, an incident that lead to the Pastry War a decade later.

== Ridership ==
Annual passenger ridership (Line 1)
Year	Ridership	Average daily	Rank	% change	Ref.
2025	627,639	1,719	193/195	NA
2024	0	0	189/195	−100.00%
2023	6,452,370	17,677	68/195	+3.92%
2022	6,208,767	17,010	56/195	−15.89%
2021	7,381,863	20,224	21/195	+7.49%
2020	6,867,731	18,764	32/195	−44.48%
2019	12,369,808	33,889	31/195	−0.94%
2018	12,486,567	34,209	27/195	−0.72%
2017	12,577,366	34,458	29/195	−3.39%
2016	13,018,121	35,568	28/195	−2.07%

Annual passenger ridership (Line 7)
Year	Ridership	Average daily	Rank	% change	Ref.
2025	2,240,669	6,138	173/195	−0.56%
2024	2,253,311	6,156	164/195	+19.69%
2023	1,882,564	5,157	159/195	+16.41%
2022	1,617,125	4,430	163/195	+41.25%
2021	1,144,856	3,136	168/195	−29.09%
2020	1,614,531	4,411	180/195	−31.31%
2019	2,350,325	6,439	179/195	−1.38%
2018	2,383,106	6,529	179/195	+6.40%
2017	2,239,783	6,136	180/195	−8.32%
2016	2,443,127	6,675	177/195	−2.18%

Annual passenger ridership (Line 9)
Year	Ridership	Average daily	Rank	% change	Ref.
2025	21,600,409	59,179	4/195	+2.25%
2024	21,125,323	57,719	4/195	+16.23%
2023	18,176,022	49,797	5/195	+12.42%
2022	16,168,449	44,297	10/195	+53.00%
2021	10,567,781	28,952	13/195	+0.33%
2020	10,533,419	28,779	15/195	−35.52%
2019	16,335,719	44,755	20/195	−6.06%
2018	17,390,292	47,644	18/195	−0.87%
2017	17,542,320	48,061	17/195	−3.78%
2016	18,231,719	49,813	17/195	+3.32%

== Nearby ==
- Parque Lira, public park.
- Museo Casa de la Bola, museum.
- Museo Nacional de Cartografía, museum of cartography.
- Alameda de Tacubaya, public plaza.

== Exits ==
=== Line 1 ===
- Northwest: Castellanos Quinto, Tacubaya
- Northeast: Av. Parque Lira, Tacubaya
- Southwest: Av. Jalisco and Rufina, Tacubaya
- Southeast: Av. Parque Lira, Tacubaya

=== Line 7 ===
- Doctora and Av. Parque Lira, Tacubaya

=== Line 9 ===
- Northwest: Av. Jalisco and Manuel Dublan, Tacubaya
- Northeast: Av. Jalisco and Iturbide, Tacubaya
- Southeast: Av. Jalisco and Mártires de la Conquista, Tacubaya

== Gallery ==
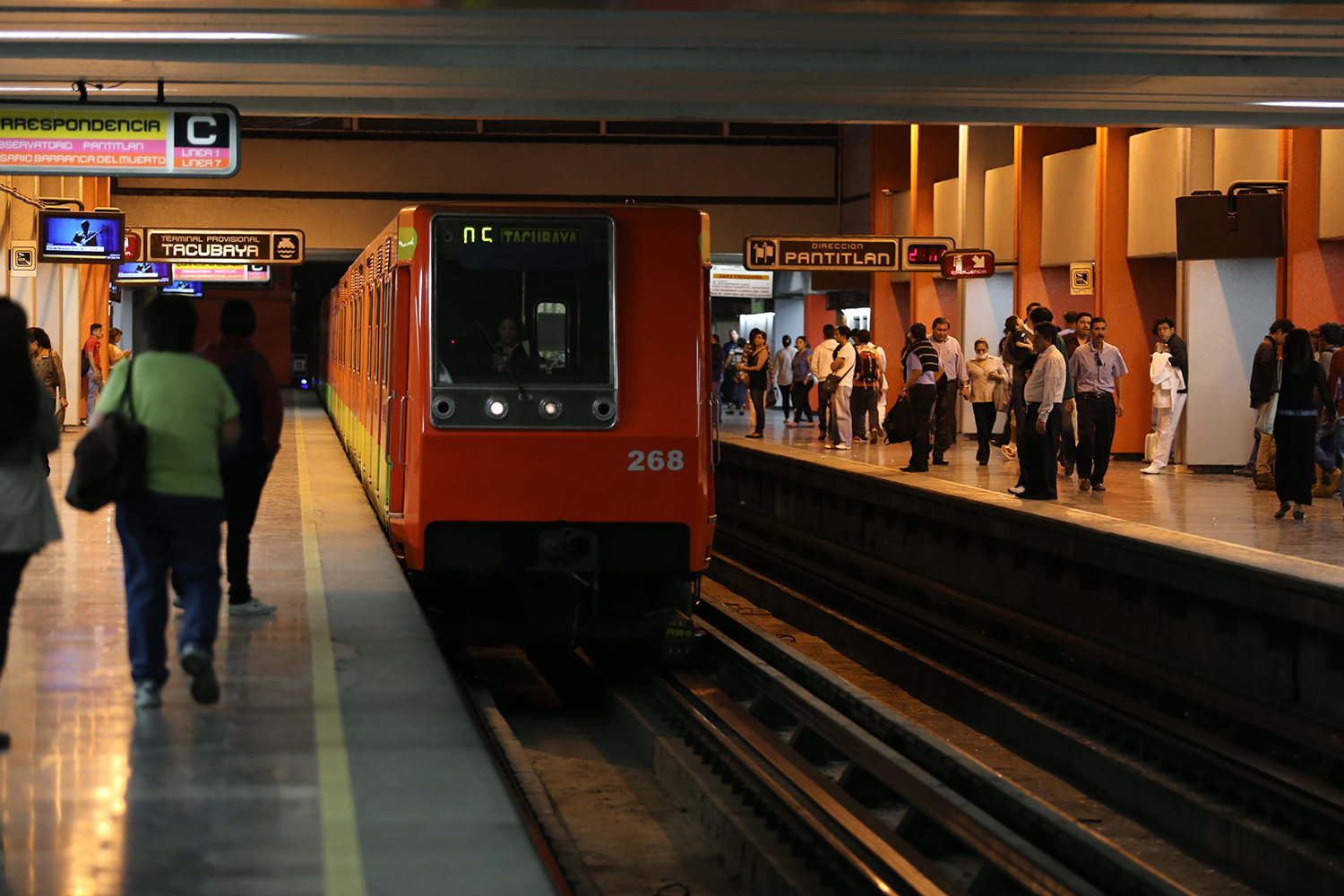
Line 9 platforms, the "provisional terminal" sign can be seen.

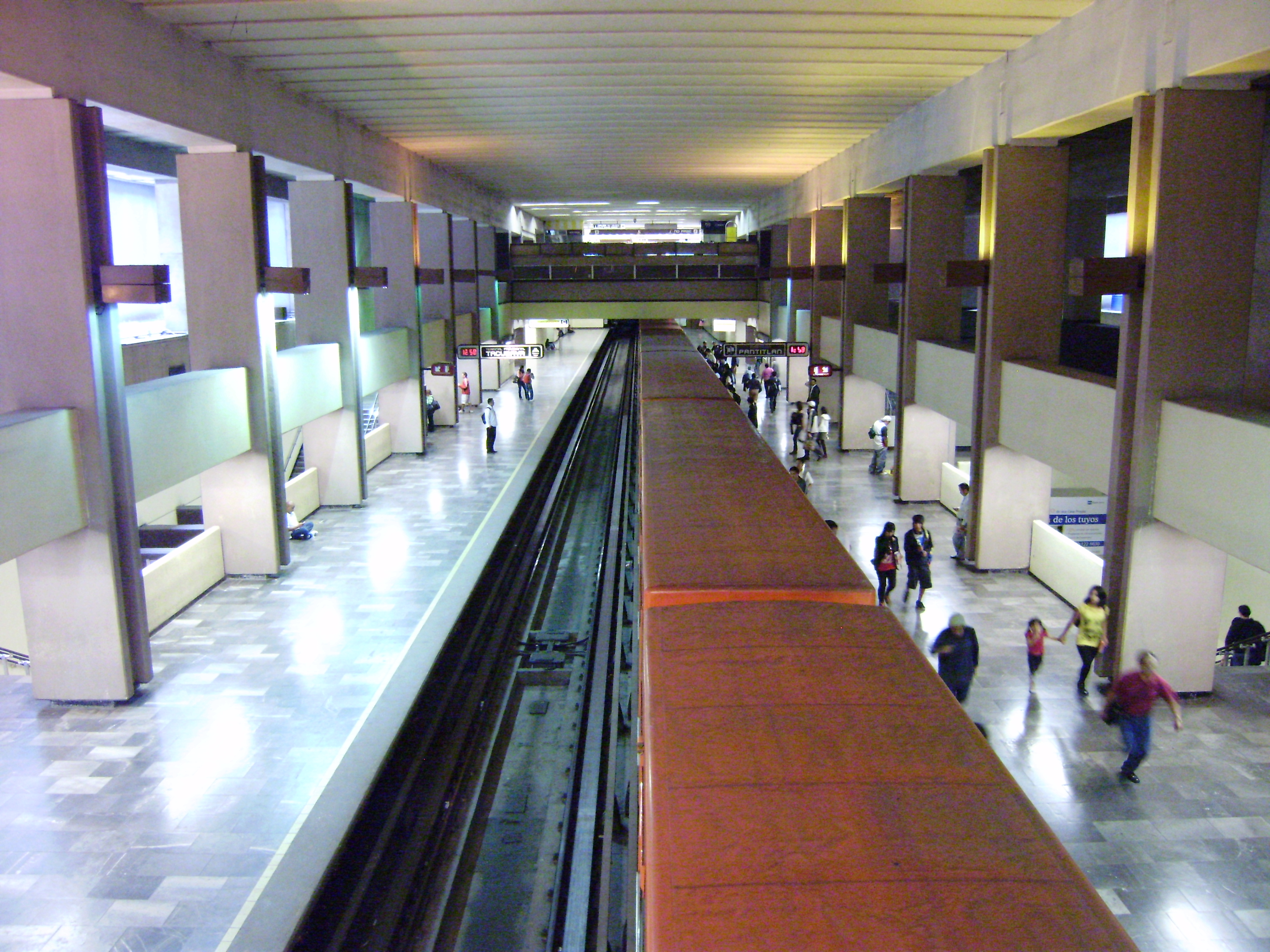
Line 9 at Tacubaya.

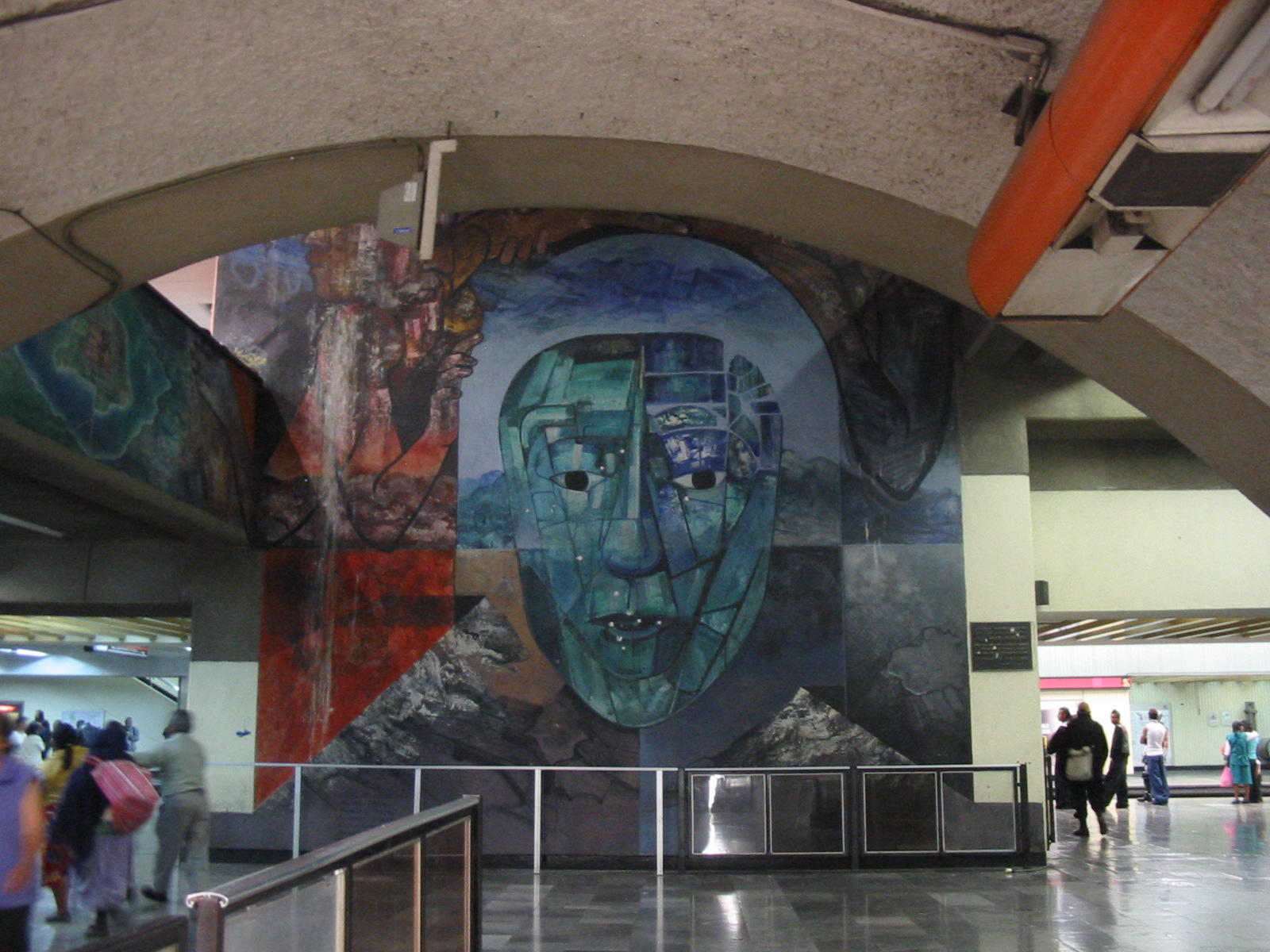
Mural of stone mask in the Line 1 section of Metro Tacubaya, at entrance to line leading towards Pantitlán.

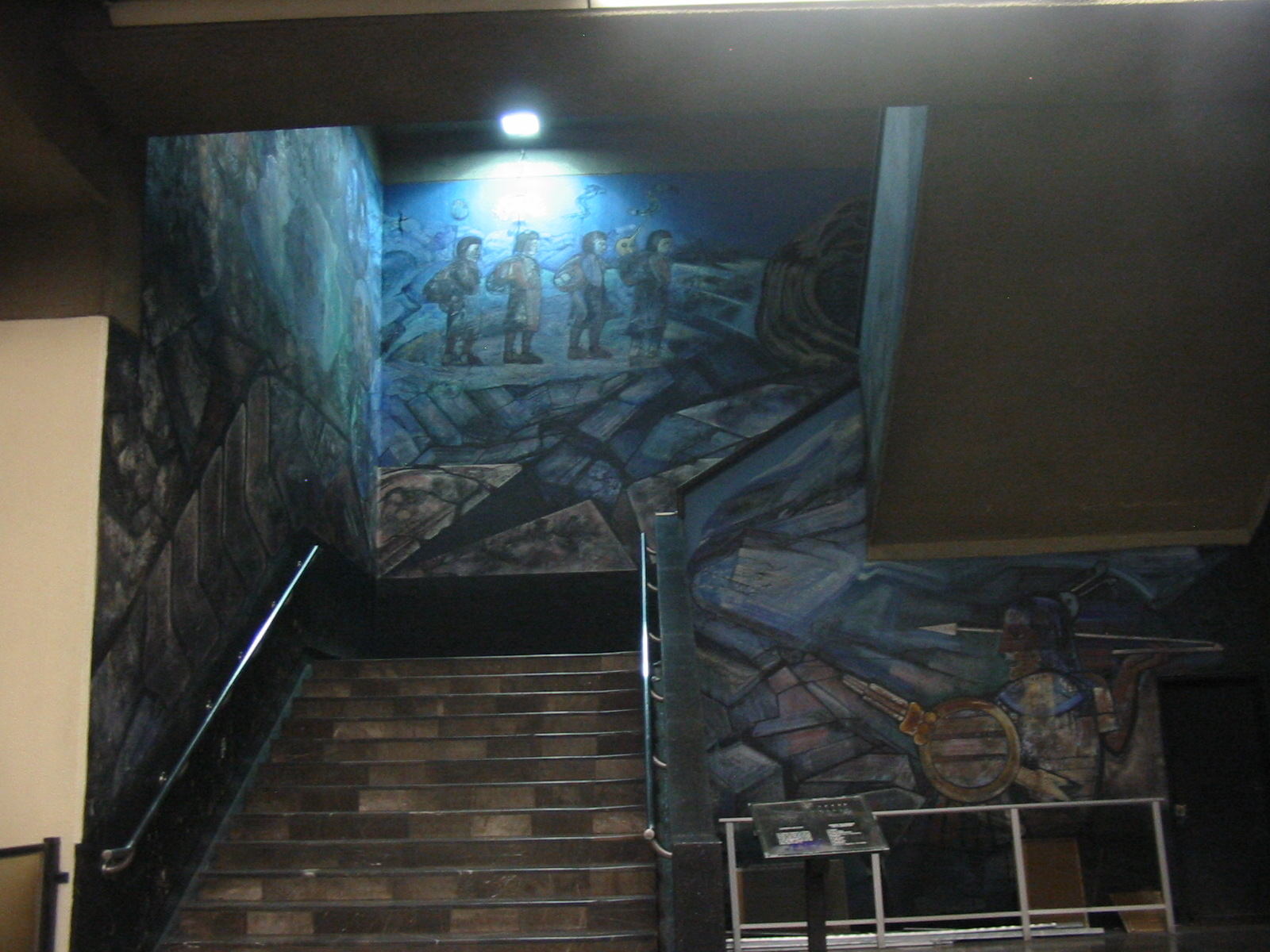
Part of stairway mural at Metro Tacubaya, Line 1 section

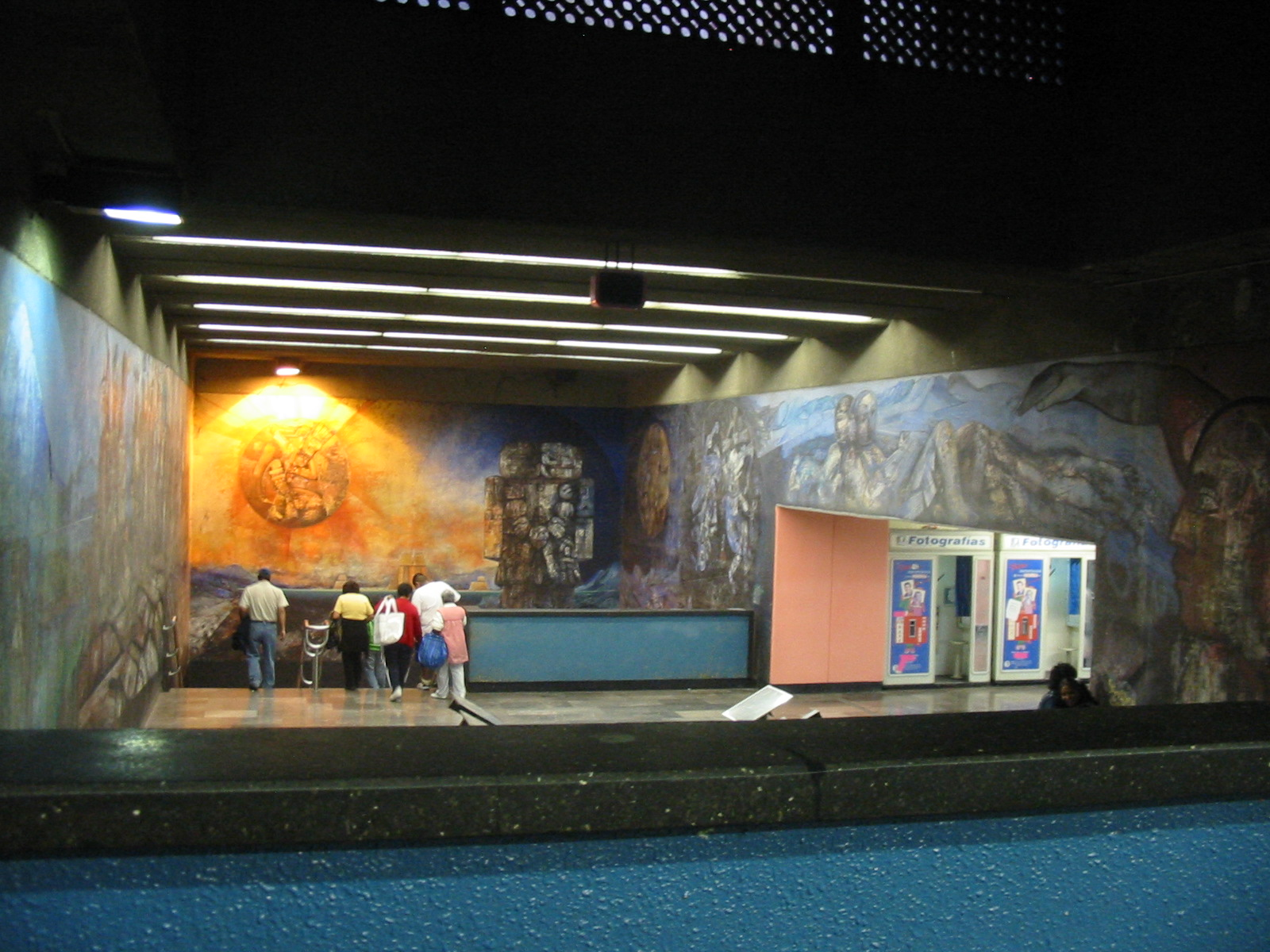
Murals covering the passageway to a stairwell in the Line 1 section of Metro Tacubaya

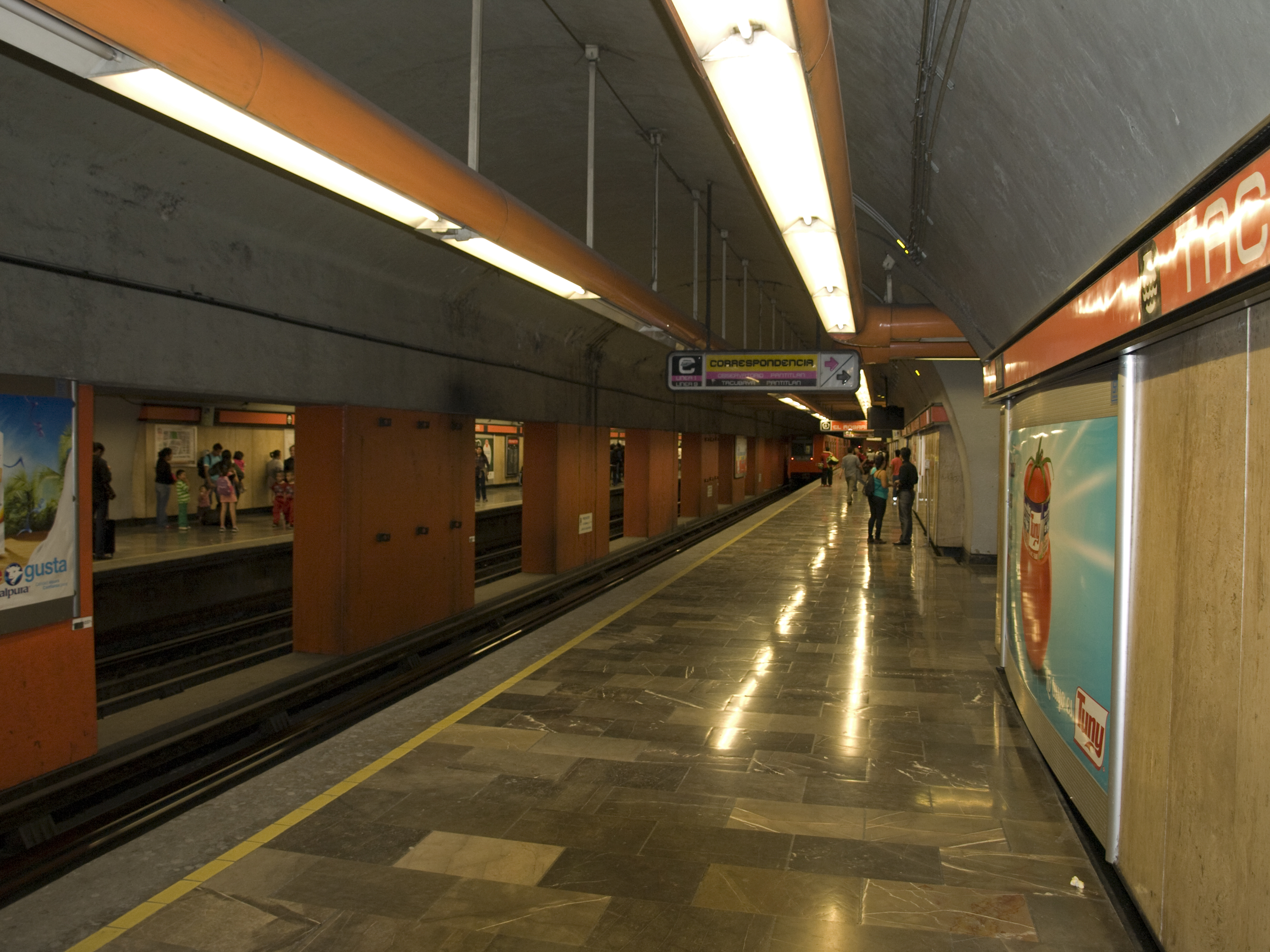
Line 7 platforms

== See also ==
- List of Mexico City metro stations
- 1975 Mexico City Metro train crash
