= Impact of the COVID-19 pandemic on baseball =

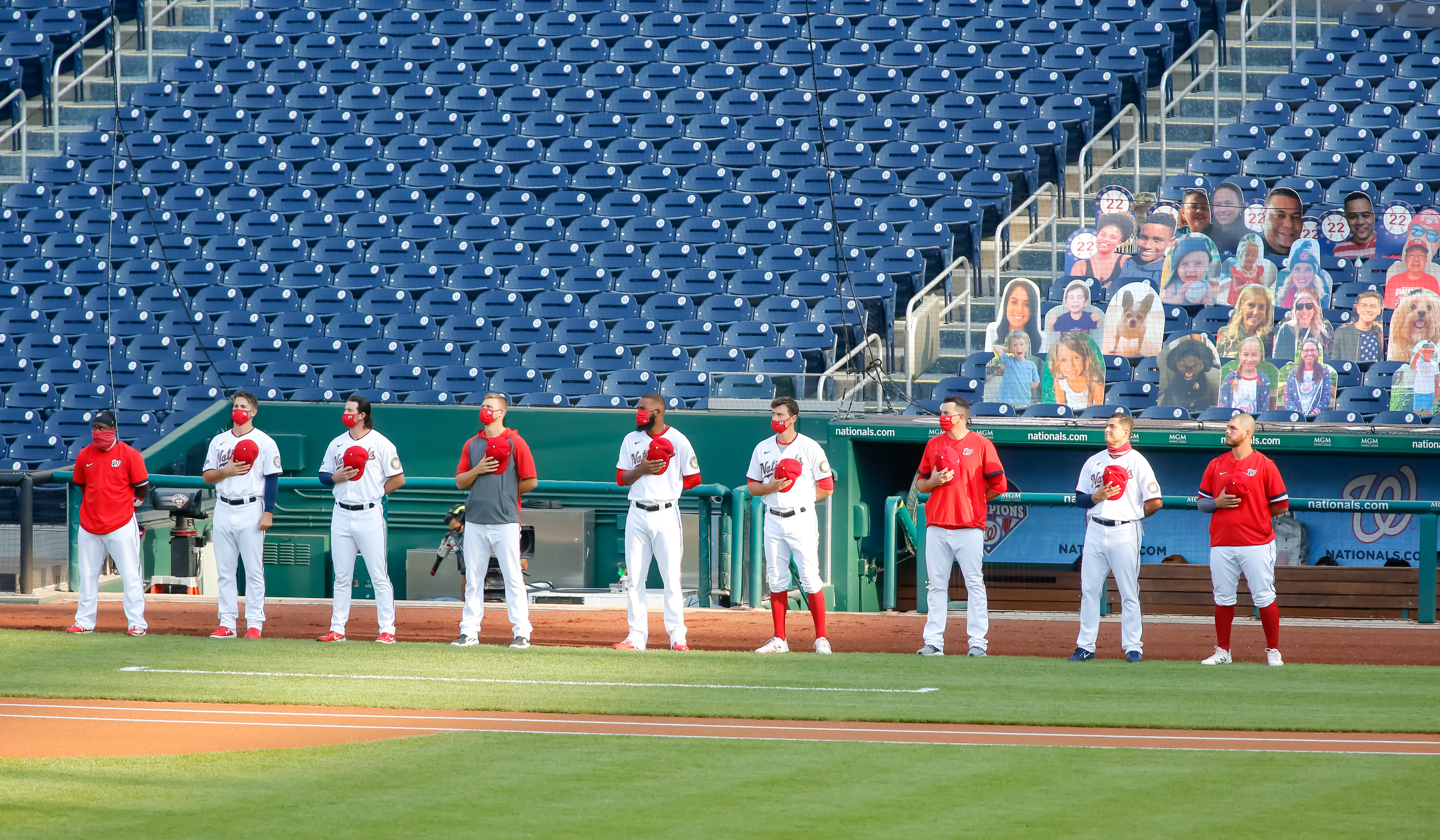
Washington Nationals players during the playing of the U.S. national anthem in a spectatorless Nationals Park

The COVID-19 pandemic has caused disruption to baseball around the world, mirroring its impact across all sports. Leagues around the world experienced delayed starts, cancelled seasons, limited or no fan attendance, game postponements, and other restrictions in 2020 and 2021. Most leagues, including Major League Baseball, began to transition back to a normal schedule with fan attendance in 2021. Since then, few leagues have widespread restrictions in place, but players may still miss time if they contract the virus.

== International competition ==
=== Professional ===
The qualifying round of the World Baseball Softball Confederation–sanctioned 2021 World Baseball Classic, in Tucson, Arizona, scheduled in March 2020 was postponed on 12 March 2020. The tournament itself has been rescheduled tentatively to 2023, depending on a new collective bargaining agreement between MLB and the players' union.

On 30 June 2020, the WBSC announced that the U-23 Baseball World Cup, scheduled to be held in September 2020 in Mexico, would be postponed until September 2021.

On 23 February 2021, the WBSC announced that the U-15 Baseball World Cup and Women's Baseball World Cup, scheduled to be held in March in Tijuana, had been postponed due to the "pandemic and associated international travel restrictions." On 1 October 2021, the two competitions were cancelled.

On 2 June 2021, the Chinese Taipei national baseball team withdrew from the final round of the qualifiers for the 2020 Summer Olympics due to concerns related to player safety from COVID-19 in Mexico. On 8 June, the Australia national baseball team withdrew from the same round due to logistical issues caused by COVID-19.

On 29 July 2021, the WBSC announced that the U-18 Baseball World Cup, scheduled to be held in September in Manatee County, Florida, would be postponed indefinitely due to a resurgence of the pandemic.

On 31 August 2021, the WBSC announced that the U-12 Baseball World Cup, scheduled to be held in summer 2021 in Tainan, Taiwan, would be postponed to summer 2022 instead.

=== Amateur ===
On 30 April 2020, Little League International announced that the 2020 Little League World Series and its associated regional qualifiers would be cancelled due to the pandemic. This was the first cancellation of the tournament since its first edition in 1947. Then the following year, Little League Baseball announced that the LLWS and Little League Softball World Series would go on, but will be played with U.S.-based teams only. Two teams will qualify from eight U.S. regions for a 16-team LLWS, and two teams qualifying from five U.S. regions will compete in a 10-team LLSWS. A planned expansion of the LLBWS field to 20 teams and the LLSWS field to 12 teams has been postponed to 2022, and all other Little League division championships have been canceled.

== By continent ==
=== Asia ===
==== Japan ====
On 26 February 2020, Nippon Professional Baseball announced that spring training would continue behind closed doors. On 9 March, the league announced that the start of its 2020 season, originally scheduled for 20 March, would be postponed until April. Eventually, the heavily modified season started on 19 June and was shortened from 143 games to 120 games. To maximize the number of intraleague games that could be played, interleague play and the All-Star Series were eliminated. Additionally, NPB's post-season, the Climax Series, was affected as well. The Pacific League reduced their post-season from two playoff series to one, while the Central League cancelled their Climax Series altogether, instead opting to advance their regular-season champion directly to the Japan Series. NPB Commissioner Atsushi Saito announced on June, fan entry admit within 5000 audience in ballpark, that start from 10 July, set on hand spray and thermo-temperatures measuring device in stadium entrance. According to NPB commissioner Saito announced on 12 September, the maximum spectator capacity increases from 11,000 to 20,000 from 19 September.

On 4 March, the Japan High School Baseball Federation announced that the National High School Baseball Invitational Tournament, scheduled to begin on 19 March, would take place without fans in attendance. However, on 11 March, the governing body of high school baseball in Japan declared that the tournament had been cancelled. The cancellation of the 2020 tournament marked the first time the contest was not organised since 1946, when the tournaments were not formally scheduled between 1942 and 1946, due to World War II. According to JHSBF chairman Eiji Hatta announced on 20 May, all games, including regional qualifying for the High School Baseball Tournament of Japan were called off, marking the first time since World War II. According to Japan Students, Baseball Association honour chairman Tatsuro Matsumae announced on 9 October, a Meiji Shrine Baseball Tournament, was called off because of restrictions around the Tokyo Metropolitan Area for the first time since 1988, when it was not held because of the illness involving Emperor Hirohito at the time.

==== South Korea ====
Opening Day of the 2020 KBO League season was originally scheduled for 28 March 2020. The Korea Baseball Organization announced in March that all ten exhibition games would be cancelled. The league later decided that exhibition games would be played starting 21 April with no spectators. The start of the regular season would also take place with no spectators, on 5 May.

==== Taiwan ====
The Taiwan-based Chinese Professional Baseball League was scheduled to begin its 2020 season on 14 March. On 1 April, the league announced that opening day would take place on 11 April, without fans in attendance. Due to inclement weather on that date, games did not begin until 12 April. On 9 May, the CPBL began admitting spectators.

=== North America ===
==== 2020 season ====
On 12 March 2020, Major League Baseball suspended all spring training activities. Opening Day of the 2020 season, scheduled for 26 March, was postponed, as was the start of the regular season for Minor League Baseball, which was to begin on 9 April. In addition, the Mexico Series and Puerto Rico Series games were canceled; the former would have featured the San Diego Padres playing the Arizona Diamondbacks at Mexico City's Estadio Alfredo Harp Helú, and the latter featuring the New York Mets playing the Miami Marlins at Hiram Bithorn Stadium in San Juan. MLB also canceled the 2020 London Series games, which would have featured the Chicago Cubs playing the St. Louis Cardinals at London Stadium. The COVID-19 pandemic was the biggest interruption of the MLB season since 2001 when several games were postponed due to the September 11, 2001 attacks.

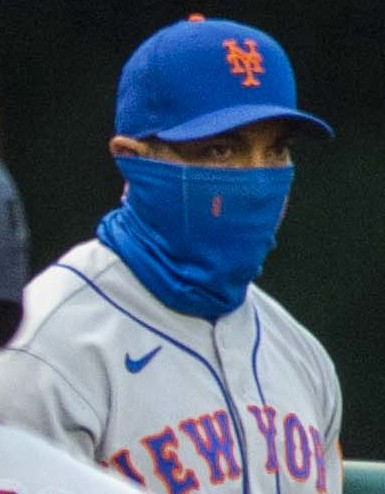
Luis Rojas of the New York Mets wears a face mask during a game in September 2020

Also on 12 March, the National Collegiate Athletic Association (NCAA) announced the suspension of its baseball season and cancellation of the entire season, further adding an automatic redshirt year without officially using a redshirt year. Seniors who would have exhausted their eligibility would not be charged a year, as most conferences had not begun their conference seasons.

On 30 April, the 2020 Little League World Series and its other associated tournaments were canceled, and with it, the Little League Classic game between the Boston Red Sox and Baltimore Orioles scheduled for 23 August in Williamsport, Pennsylvania was subsequently changed to a regular home game for the Orioles.

Several summer collegiate baseball leagues were canceled entirely, while others postponed their starts from the beginning of June to the beginning of July. The Portland Pickles of the West Coast League announced that they would play without fans, while several other teams withdrew from their leagues entirely.

In late May 2020, multiple members of the Fieras del San Fernando of the Nicaraguan Professional Baseball League contracted COVID. Coach Carlos Aranda fell ill, was brought to a hospital in Nicaragua already unconscious and died. The deaths attracted attention to the government's response to the pandemic as Nicaragua was one of the few countries in which sporting events continued as scheduled.

On 30 June 2020 the Minor League Baseball season was canceled outright. On 1 July, the 2020 Mexican Baseball League season was cancelled, citing that the league's reliance on ticket sales for team revenue made playing games behind closed doors economically unviable.

A shortened 60-game 2020 Major League Baseball season began on 23 July; all neutral site games were cancelled, and no game was played outside of the Contiguous United States (including international neutral site games, and the Toronto Blue Jays playing most of their home games at Sahlen Field in Buffalo (home of the Buffalo Bisons, a Blue Jays minor league affiliate) rather than Rogers Centre due to Canadian travel restrictions). The schedule limited games to divisional opponents to reduce travel, with interleague games played against corresponding divisions (i.e. AL East vs. NL East) rather than the annual alternating cycle. New temporary rules were enacted, including social distancing violations with umpires and opposing players being classified as unsportsmanlike conduct, the National League using designated hitters for all games, and a modified version of the international tiebreaker where each half-inning begins with a runner on second base. It was later decided for health and safety reasons, games in doubleheaders would also be shortened to seven innings (a rule standard in minor league play).

The postseason was expanded to 16 teams, with the top two teams in each of the six divisions, as well as the top two remaining teams based on regular season records, advancing to the best-of-three "Wild Card Series" round (which replaced the usual Wild Card Game). The winners advanced to the eight-team Division Series round as normal. Approximately 40 regular season games were cancelled due to outbreaks within teams. It was later announced that in an effort to diminish the impact of further outbreaks, all postseason games would be centralized at one of several venues in California or Texas beginning with the Division Series round, and that the entirety of the 2020 World Series would be held at Globe Life Field in Arlington, Texas, new home of the Texas Rangers. All games throughout the season were played behind closed doors, with the only exceptions being the 2020 National League Championship Series and 2020 World Series at Globe Life Field (which offered limited in-person attendance).

After Game 6 of the World Series, Los Angeles Dodgers third baseman Justin Turner stormed onto the field with his teammates to celebrate his team's championship, despite having been removed from the game in the eighth inning after testing positive for COVID-19. Turner later apologized for the incident, and Commissioner of Baseball Rob Manfred announced that no actions would be taken, citing Turner's apology and admitting that "we all have made mistakes as we navigated these unprecedented challenges and have tried to learn from those mistakes so they are not repeated."

Temporary rules for the postseason tiebreaker, designated hitter, and extra innings are still in use as of the 2022 season, though the National League did not use the designated hitter in 2021. The Wild Card Series was officially implemented in 2022, with only 12 teams instead of 16 teams. The top two division winners earn a bye to the Division Series. The third-place division winner plays the third-best non-winner based on record, and the first and second placed non-division winners playing in the other round, using the same best-of-three Wild Card Series format.

==== 2021 season ====
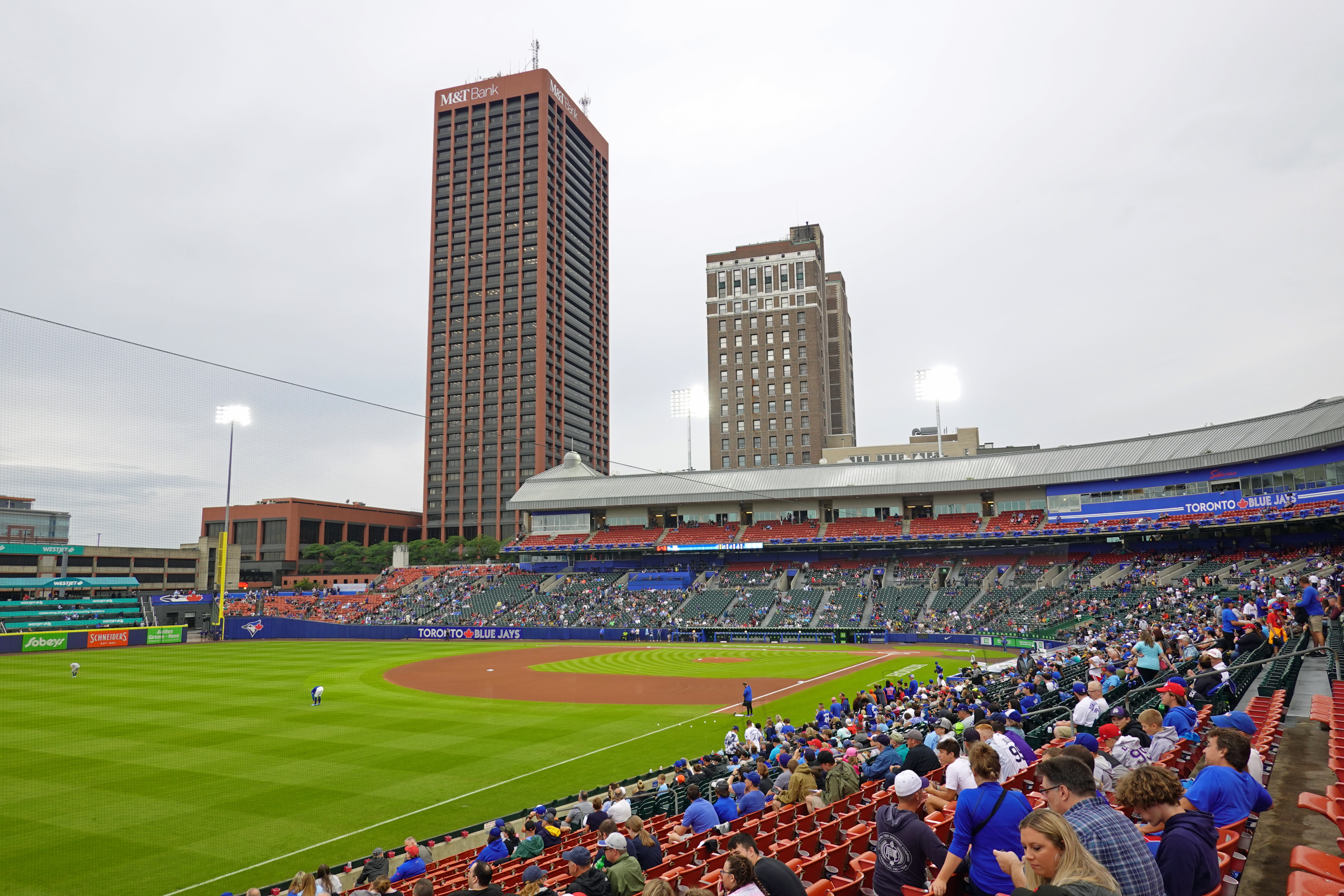
A Toronto Blue Jays home game at Sahlen Field in Buffalo in July 2021

Major League Baseball returned to a full 162-game season for 2021, but some protocols and scheduling changes from the 2020 season remain in place, including shortened doubleheader games, and interleague games being played against teams from the corresponding region. No games are scheduled outside the contiguous United States or Canada. The Blue Jays hoped to return to Rogers Centre if travel restrictions permitted, but instead began the season at their spring training home of TD Ballpark in Dunedin, Florida before returning to Sahlen Field beginning in June. On 16 July, the team received a National Letter of Exemption from the Canadian government allowing home games to return to Toronto, effective with the contest of 30 July. Strict health protocols were in place for visiting teams and attendance was limited to 15,000 fans per game.

Minor League Baseball, which had extensive retooling during the offseason, revealed its original schedule for the season on 18 February. It included staggered starts for the Triple-A level (6 April or 8 April) and all other levels (4 May). Triple-A teams would play 142 games each, and all other teams would play 120 games each. All games were played in six-game series at a single ballpark, with one day off during each series. Originally, no postseason play was planned, but on 1 July MiLB reversed course and announced that the top two teams in each league from Low-A to Double-A, based on winning percentage, played a best-of-5 series. The Triple-A level had two separate championships: one for the teams with the best regular-season record, and the other for the winners of 10-game mini-tournaments called the "Triple-A Final Stretch." On 3 March, MLB informed its minor-league organizations that the start of the Triple-A season would be postponed until sometime in early May, at the same time of those of other levels. Players assigned to Triple-A teams would be sent to alternate training sites, which were used by MLB organizations in 2020 as well.

On 12 February 2021, the National Baseball Hall of Fame and Museum announced that a smaller, indoor ceremony would replace the usual outdoor event. The inductions of Derek Jeter, Larry Walker, Ted Simmons, and Marvin Miller had already been postponed by one year when that ceremony was canceled outright. Unrelated to the pandemic and because no candidates met the year's election criteria, no new members were inducted in 2021. On 9 June, HOF officials announced a change to an outdoor ceremony with a limited number of tickets available, with the event scheduled for 8 September.

On 5 April 2021, the Texas Rangers held its home opener at Globe Life Field with around 38,000 fans, after having announced that it would not limit capacity for the game. This came as the state of Texas removed capacity limits for businesses state-wide. Despite criticism from health officials and U.S. president Joe Biden, there were no significant spikes in cases tied to Rangers games, and cases had been declining in the state. By May 2021, as restrictions eased across the country due to vaccination progress and a resulting reduction in caseloads, teams have gradually increased their spectator limits, and more teams announced plans to remove restrictions. Prior to the start of the season, MLB and the MLBPA announced that they would allow teams to ease their COVID-19 protocols if at least 85% of their "tier 1" staff (such as players) are fully-vaccinated.

Early on the morning of 26 June, the NCAA announced that North Carolina State had to withdraw from the College World Series due to multiple positive tests and required contract tracing. On 25 June, the Wolfpack had lost to Vanderbilt with only 13 players available.

==== 2022 season ====
Most Major League Baseball restrictions were lifted by the 2022 season, and the season began without any COVID-related delays or attendance restrictions for the first time since 2019. The season also marked the return of television and radio broadcast teams to road games, with some teams such as the Los Angeles Dodgers, New York Yankees, and New York Mets sending their broadcasters to call away games in person. Other broadcast teams, such as the MASN teams covering the Washington Nationals and Baltimore Orioles, initially chose to remain remote for road games in 2022, but quickly retreated following fan backlash. Some teams, like NESN's Boston Red Sox commentators, decided between remote and in-person broadcasting on a series-by-series basis. The Los Angeles Angels' lead commentator Matt Vasgersian called games from MLB Network's studios in New Jersey to accommodate his day-to-day contributions to the channel.

While few MLB-imposed restrictions remained in place by 2022, players and personnel still had to comply with local ordinances relating to the pandemic. As the regular season approached, New York City's worker vaccine mandate posed a threat towards the ability of unvaccinated Yankees and Mets players to play games at Yankee Stadium and Citi Field. On March 24, following campaigning for the decision by Yankees and Mets executives, New York City mayor Eric Adams announced an exemption to the vaccine mandate for professional athletes and performers, allowing unvaccinated players on the two teams to play games within the city. During the 2022 season, Canada's border vaccination requirement remained in place, barring unvaccinated players from playing against the Toronto Blue Jays in Rogers Centre. The travel restriction created a notable impact for division rivals, with Boston pitcher Tanner Houck missing a scheduled start in Toronto as a result.

For the third consecutive season, COVID-19 was the direct cause of at least one game postponement. That occurred on May 11, when the last game of a three-game series between the Cleveland Guardians and the Chicago White Sox was postponed due to numerous positive tests among the Guardians, including manager Terry Francona.

==== 2023 season ====
Kansas City Royals manager Matt Quatraro left the team on April 5 after testing positive. Bench coach Paul Hoover took over on an interim basis, through at least April 9.

=== Oceania ===
In September 2021, the Australian Baseball League announced that the start of its upcoming season would be delayed until November due to COVID outbreaks. In October 2021, the Australian Baseball League announced that the season would be canceled.
