= 2020 Major League Baseball season =

2020 MLB season
- League: Major League Baseball
- Sport: Baseball
- Duration: July 23 – October 27, 2020
- Games: 60
- Teams: 30
- TV partner(s): Fox/FS1; TBS; ESPN/ABC; MLB Network

Draft
- Top draft pick: Spencer Torkelson
- Picked by: Detroit Tigers

Regular season
- Season MVP: AL: José Abreu (CWS); NL: Freddie Freeman (ATL)

Postseason
- AL champions: Tampa Bay Rays
- AL runners-up: Houston Astros
- NL champions: Los Angeles Dodgers
- NL runners-up: Atlanta Braves

World Series
- Champions: Los Angeles Dodgers
- Runners-up: Tampa Bay Rays
- World Series MVP: Corey Seager (LAD)

MLB seasons
- ← 2019 2021 →

Locations of AL teams for the 2020 MLB season
West Central East
Locations of NL teams for the 2017–present MLB seasons
West Central East

The 2020 Major League Baseball season began on July 23 and ended on September 27 with only 60 games amid the COVID-19 pandemic. The full 162-game regular season was planned to begin on March 26, but the pandemic caused Major League Baseball (MLB) to announce on March 12 that the remainder of spring training was canceled and that the start of the regular season would be delayed by at least two weeks. On March 16, MLB announced that the season would be postponed indefinitely, following recommendations from the Centers for Disease Control and Prevention (CDC) to restrict events of more than 50 people. This was the first time that MLB games had been put on hold since the 2001 season, when the season was paused for over a week after the September 11 attacks.

Spring training resumed on July 1 and was rebranded as "Summer Camp". On July 3, the All-Star Game was canceled because of the delay to the regular season. Dodger Stadium, which was set to host the game, went on to host the 2022 All-Star Game.

On July 18, the Canadian federal government denied permission for the Toronto Blue Jays to play their home games at Rogers Centre in 2020 on grounds that repeated cross-border trips by both the Blue Jays and their opponents would be a major risk due to the higher spikes in COVID-19 cases in the U.S. compared to those in Canada. The Blue Jays then chose to play their home games at Sahlen Field in Buffalo, home of their Triple-A affiliate Buffalo Bisons.

An expanded 16-team postseason tournament began on September 29, with games of all but the first round being played at neutral sites. The World Series began on October 20 at Globe Life Field in Arlington, and ended on October 27, with the Los Angeles Dodgers defeating the Tampa Bay Rays in six games to win their first title since 1988.

== Schedule ==
The 2020 schedule greatly differed from the normal 162-game schedule. In an effort to reduce travel, each team played only nine opponents during the regular season instead of the usual 19 or 20. Teams were scheduled to play 10 games against each of their four division opponents. The remaining 20 games of the 60-game schedule were interleague contests. To reduce travel, the interleague division match-ups were AL East vs NL East, AL Central vs NL Central, and AL West vs NL West. At 60 games, this was the shortest regular season since 1878.

Several international and neutral-site games originally scheduled for the season were canceled due to COVID-19:

- On March 19, the Mexico Series and Puerto Rico Series games were canceled; the former would have featured the San Diego Padres and the Arizona Diamondbacks at Mexico City's Estadio Alfredo Harp Helú, and the latter featuring the New York Mets and the Miami Marlins at Hiram Bithorn Stadium in San Juan.
- On April 1, MLB canceled the London Series, which would have featured the Chicago Cubs and the St. Louis Cardinals at London Stadium.
- On April 30, MLB canceled the MLB Little League Classic at BB&T Ballpark in Williamsport, Pennsylvania, coinciding with the Little League World Series, which was scheduled to be played on August 23 between the Boston Red Sox and Baltimore Orioles. This cancellation coincided with the cancellation of the 2020 Little League World Series.
- On August 3, MLB canceled MLB at Field of Dreams — a game that was scheduled to be played on August 13 between the St. Louis Cardinals and Chicago White Sox at a temporary 8,000-seat ballpark on the Dyersville, Iowa farm site of the 1989 sports film Field of Dreams. The game was postponed to 2021.

=== March agreement between MLB and MLBPA ===
On March 26, MLB and the Major League Baseball Players Association (MLBPA) reached an agreement on multiple considerations related to the start of the season being delayed, including:

- The 2020 MLB draft was to be held by July 20 and reduced from 40 rounds to five rounds.
- Player salaries were pro-rated, based on the length of the regular season.
- Players will receive full service time for the season, regardless of the length of the season
- Roster moves were frozen as of March 27, until the season began.

=== Possible schedules ===
The indefinite delay of the season caused MLB to internally consider a number of scenarios for playing the season, as well as analysts suggesting ways it could be done. A shortened regular season, a season with many doubleheaders, and a postseason extending into late November with a World Series at an indoor or warm-weather neutral site were suggested.

In early April, Jeff Passan of ESPN reported that MLB was "increasingly focused on a plan that could allow them to start the season as early as May and has the support of high-ranking federal public health officials". The plan would have involved all 30 teams playing games with no fans in stadiums around the Phoenix metropolitan area, including Chase Field and spring training complexes. Players would have lived in isolation at local hotels.

Another report from USA Today baseball writer Bob Nightengale detailed another MLB proposal utilizing the Phoenix metro sites, but with the additional use of spring training sites in Florida, Marlins Park in Miami, and St. Petersburg's Tropicana Field. In addition, the 30 teams would be re-aligned for the season depending on their spring training sites into six divisions based upon their locations in Arizona and Florida and agnostic to the usual AL/NL demarcations and traditional geographic rivalries, effectively making the spring training Cactus League and Grapefruit League regular-season leagues. No interleague play would take place and the designated hitter rule would be utilized for all 30 teams, with the World Series occurring in November utilizing the larger MLB sites.

=== Disagreement over plans for a shortened season ===
During May and June, MLB and Major League Baseball Players Association (MLBPA) were unable to agree on a specific plan for a shortened season.

In mid-May the MLB owners proposed a schedule of 82 games, to begin in July, with games to be played without fans in attendance. To minimize travel, teams would play only against other teams in their geographical division, plus interleague games against teams in the corresponding division of the other league. A team would play 13 games against each division rival and six games against each team in the other league's division. Postseason play would be expanded from 10 teams to 14, with each league fielding three division winners and four wild card teams. A designated hitter would be allowed in all games. Teams would have 30-man rosters available for each game. The proposal also outlined safety measures for health of players and staff and a modified compensation plan for players.

On June 1, the MLBPA countered with a 114-game proposal, with a regular season running from June 30 to October 31, a November postseason, giving players the right to opt-out of participating, a salary deferral plan in the event the postseason has to be canceled due to a second wave of the virus, and a $100 million advance during the second spring training, among others.

Owners then submitted a 76-game proposal to the players on June 8, with the regular season ending on September 27, the postseason ending in October, 75 percent prorated player salaries, and playoff pool money, among others. The MLBPA responded one day later with an 89-game plan with full prorated player salaries. The owners then sent a 72-game plan with 70 percent prorated player salaries, to which the MLBPA replied in a statement on June 13, "Further dialogue with the league would be futile. It's time to get back to work. Tell us when and where." However, the week of June 15 saw the owners propose a 60-game season while MLBPA counter with a 70-game season, which on June 19 was rejected by the owners.

Amid an increase in cases in Arizona and Florida, including positive cases among staff of the Phillies, and a Blue Jays player showing signs of symptoms, it was reported on June 19 that all spring training sites would be temporarily closed for deep cleaning, and all players would be required to test negative for COVID-19 before entering. It was then reported on June 20 that almost all MLB teams had elected to re-locate their training camps back to their home cities.

On June 22, hours after the MLBPA rejected the MLB's offer to play a 60-game season, MLB owners voted unanimously to impose the 60-game plan. By allowing the owners to unilaterally implement such a plan without the MLBPA, both sides retained the right to file a grievance against the other for not negotiating in good faith. On June 23, both sides agreed to health and safety protocols. Players reported to training camp July 1. Due to concerns related to the pandemic, several players chose not to play the season.

=== Revised 60-game schedule ===
On July 6, MLB released the revised schedule for the shortened 60-game season. In the new schedule, teams played 10 games against each of their four divisional opponents in three series, with an unequal number of home games against each opponent. Each team had 20 home games for division opponents.

Interleague play comprised the other 20 games of the schedule, all against the division of the opposite league, temporarily suspending the yearly rotation of which divisions play each other. Like normal seasons in which corresponding interleague divisions play each other (e.g. 2018), teams played six games against their "natural rival" and three or four games against each of the other four teams in the division. However, for this year only, the Cleveland Indians were paired with the Pittsburgh Pirates instead of their normal rivals, the Cincinnati Reds, and the Detroit Tigers were paired with the Reds instead of the Pirates. This was done to reduce travel for all four teams.

The season started on July 23, with two games: New York Yankees at Washington Nationals and San Francisco Giants at Los Angeles Dodgers. The remaining 26 teams opened the season on July 24.

On July 23, MLB and MLBPA announced that the postseason would be an expanded 16-team playoff tournament for 2020 only, instead of the normal 10-team tournament. All first and second place teams in the six divisions would qualify for the playoffs. The final two spots in each league would go to the remaining teams with the best win–loss records. The teams in each league would be seeded by division winners (1–3), division runners-up (4–6), and best teams remaining (7–8). Seeding ties would be resolved by head-to-head record, intra-league record, and record in final 20 intra-league games, to remove the necessity for additional games. The first round of the playoffs would be a best-of-three series called the Wild Card Series, with all games to be played at the home of the higher seeded team. After that, the postseason would follow the usual pattern of five-game Division series, seven-game League Championship Series, and a seven-game World Series.

=== Postponed games ===
==== COVID-19 ====
COVID-19 outbreaks among the Miami Marlins and St. Louis Cardinals, as well as positive tests on the Cincinnati Reds, New York Mets, Oakland Athletics, and San Francisco Giants, resulted in the postponement of a total of 40 games.

Miami received confirmation that starting pitcher José Ureña had tested positive and would not be available on July 26, but the team decided to play the third and final game of their scheduled series against the Philadelphia Phillies at the direction of Major League Baseball. After additional Miami players and coaches tested positive, MLB postponed Miami's four-game home-and-home series with the Baltimore Orioles, and Philadelphia's four-game home-and-home series with the New York Yankees, both originally scheduled from July 27 to 30. In order to allow for some flexibility in making games up, the Yankees and Orioles played two games against each other in Baltimore July 29 and 30, moving them up one week from their originally scheduled dates of August 3 and 4. The Marlins later confirmed that 21 players and coaches tested positive. The next series for both teams, Miami's home series against the Washington Nationals and Philadelphia's series at the Toronto Blue Jays, were postponed. Both series would have taken place from July 31 to August 2.

St. Louis had six positive tests resulting in the postponement of three games at the Milwaukee Brewers from July 31 to August 2. Four additional games, a home-and-home series against the Detroit Tigers originally scheduled for August 3 to 6, were also postponed after an additional seven positive tests were reported. After continued positive tests throughout the next week, St. Louis's three-game series against the Chicago Cubs, originally August 7 to 9, and their three-game series against the Pittsburgh Pirates, originally August 10 to 12, were postponed. A doubleheader against Detroit on August 13 which would have been made up games from August 3 and 4 was also postponed and later canceled.

Cincinnati had a player test positive resulting in the postponement of two games against Pittsburgh on August 15 and 16. Cincinnati's game against the Kansas City Royals on August 18 was postponed as well.

The New York Mets had a player and staff member test positive resulting in the postponement of their August 20 game against Miami and their three-game series against the New York Yankees on August 21 to 23.

Oakland had a positive test resulting in the postponement of their August 30 game against the Houston Astros. As a precaution, Oakland's three-game series against the Seattle Mariners on September 1 to 3 was postponed.

San Francisco had a positive test resulting in the postponement of two games against the San Diego Padres originally scheduled for September 11 and 12.

All postponed games were made up except for two games between the St. Louis Cardinals and Detroit Tigers, with both teams completing 58 out of 60 games. This had no bearing on the playoff teams other than seeding.

==== Shooting of Jacob Blake ====
Player protests in response to the shooting of Jacob Blake in Kenosha, Wisconsin resulted in the postponement of 11 games.

The Milwaukee Brewers announced that they would not play their August 26 game against the Cincinnati Reds in the wake of the shooting, following three NBA playoff games that were postponed the same day. Two additional games were postponed that day. Seven games on August 27 and one game on August 28 were also postponed.

== Rule changes ==
=== Permanent changes announced prior to season ===
The following changes, effective for the 2020 season, were officially announced by MLB on February 12:

- The size of the active roster expands from 25 players to 26 players, through August 31.
  - During this time, and during the postseason, clubs can carry a maximum of 13 pitchers.
  - Any team that is playing the second game of a doubleheader or a scheduled neutral-site game (such as the MLB Little League Classic) may carry a 27th player for that game only. This player can either be a position player or pitcher.
- The size of the expanded roster in September is reduced from 40 players to 28 players.
  - During this time, clubs can carry a maximum of 14 pitchers.
  - Any team that is playing the second game of a doubleheader or a scheduled neutral-site game may carry a 29th player for that game only. This player can either be a position player or pitcher.
- Teams must designate players as either "position players" or "pitchers" before the start of the season.
  - Only players designated as pitchers will be allowed to pitch in any regular-season or postseason game, with limited exceptions (such as one team leading by at least seven runs, or the game going into extra innings).
  - Once a position player has pitched at least 20 innings and made at least three plate appearances as a position player or designated hitter in each of 20 games, he earns the status of "two-way player" for the remainder of the season plus all of the next season. Players with this status may pitch at any time during a game. For this season only, any player who met the above requirements in either the 2018 or 2019 season qualifies for two-way status.
  - Players designated as pitchers, if placed on the injured list, must spend a minimum of 15 days on the IL prior to being eligible for activation. Position players may be activated after a minimum of 10 days on the IL. Two-way players are subject to the rules for pitchers. The seven-day minimum on the IL for concussions remains unchanged.
- Pitchers and two-way players optioned to the minor leagues must remain there for at least 15 days before being eligible for recall to the major league club, rather than the previous 10-day minimum. The minimum option period for position players remains 10 days.
- A pitcher must face at least three batters unless the inning ends or the pitcher is injured.
- Managers now have up to 20 seconds to challenge a play (reduced from 30 seconds).

Additionally, Rule 7.04 governing protested games was amended to read "Protesting a game shall never be permitted, regardless of whether such complaint is based on judgement decisions by the umpire or an allegation that an umpire misapplied these rules or otherwise rendered a decision in violation of these rules."

=== Temporary rules for shortened 2020 season ===
The following temporary rules for the shortened 2020 season were announced on June 24. Note that some of these additional changes supersede the rule changes which were announced in February.

- Each club could invite up to 60 players to its July training camp. The 60-man pool is composed of players on the 40-man roster and players currently signed to minor league contracts. Clubs were not required to include all members of their 40-man roster in the 60-man pool. The transaction freeze in place since March 27 was lifted on June 26. Only players eligible to play in the 2020 season could be invited to July camp, and only the 60 players included on the list submitted to the league office may be used by the team in regular season and postseason games for the 2020 season. If a player is added to the 60-man pool via trade, free agent signing, or other transaction, a corresponding transaction must be made to keep the total number of eligible players at 60. Players in the 60-man pool who were not on a club's 40-man roster at the start of July camp must be added to the 40-man and active rosters in the usual fashion before they may play in regular season or postseason games. Those not on the active roster train at an alternate training site.
- The designated hitter was used in both the American and National Leagues.
- Teams could have up to 30 active players on their opening day rosters. The active roster was reduced to 28 after the first two weeks of the season. Originally, the roster was set to reduce to reduce to 26 players after four weeks, but this reduction was eliminated on August 4.
- The minimum option period for players optioned to their club's training site is 10 days for both pitchers and position players. The provision requiring pitchers to remain in the minor leagues for 15 days is not in effect this season.
- The trade deadline was August 31 (moved from July 31).
- To be eligible for the postseason, a player must have been added to a club's 40-man roster by September 15.
- Clubs were permitted to carry a taxi-squad of players for away games. Originally, the squad was limited to three players. On August 4, the squad was expanded to five players. The original rule stipulated that if three players were carried, at least one had to be a catcher. It is unclear if that restriction remains under the new rule.
- In regular-season games, extra innings used the World Baseball Softball Confederation softball tiebreaker rule. Each half-inning of an extra inning automatically started with a runner on second base, colloquially referred to as a "ghost runner". The runner was the player in the batting order position immediately before the lead-off batter for the inning (or a pinch-runner, subject to the usual substitution rules). Should this runner score, it was considered an unearned run charged to the pitcher who started the inning. This rule was not applied to postseason games.
- There was a 10-day injured list for both pitchers and position players. The 60-day IL was reduced to 45 days.
- A separate IL exists for players who test positive for, have symptoms of, or have confirmed exposure to COVID-19. There is no maximum or minimum number of days for this IL.
- There are no limitations on eligible pitchers. The "two-way player" provisions announced in February do not apply for this season.
- Once the game has started, the postseason rule adopted in 2009 will be in effect in case of inclement weather until it has reached official game status. The game was declared a suspended game, continuing from the point of interruption instead of completely restarting.
- The postseason was expanded to include eight teams from each league. The first round was a best-of-three series with the better seed hosting all three games.
- The final three rounds of postseason were to be played at neutral sites.
  - Globe Life Field and Minute Maid Park were chosen to host the National League playoffs; each stadium hosted one Division Series and Globe Life Field hosted the National League Championship Series. Spectators were permitted at Globe Life Field starting with the National League Championship Series.
  - Petco Park and Dodger Stadium were chosen to host the American League playoffs; each stadium hosted one Division Series and Petco Park hosted the American League Championship Series.
  - The World Series was held at Globe Life Field.
- Clubs were required to have an expanded dugout in order to practice social distancing.
- Celebrations (such as those after a walk-off hit) were socially distanced.
- Pitchers were allowed to use wet rags.
- In the postseason, alcohol and champagne were banned from playoff celebrations, with celebrations on the field, at least six feet apart, and not in the clubhouse.
- No physical lineup cards were exchanged. Instead, lineups are now exchanged publicly through a push notification on the MLB app which is also pushed to fans following each team.

The following temporary rule was announced on July 30, to be effective on August 1.

- Doubleheaders consisted of two seven-inning games, as is the case in minor leagues. One doubleheader, which was played on July 28 before the rule change, featured two nine-inning games.
  - If a suspended game resumes with the trailing team having played less than five innings, the game played after the completion of the suspended game will be seven innings.
    - However, if a game is halted after the fifth inning for a reason that enables it to be a suspended game (like a field issue or equipment failure or if the game was tied when stopped), the game played afterwards retains its nine-inning length.
  - In all cases, a suspended game retains the length (seven or nine innings) that it was scheduled for at the time it started.

== Spring training ==
Spring training for the 2020 season took place in two segments. The first segment began in late February and lasted until mid-March, abruptly ending early due to the COVID-19 pandemic. Teams began workouts and practice for spring training beginning in late February. Pitchers and catchers reported first, followed by position players a few days later. Following the MLB owners unanimous vote to impose the 60-game regular season plan, the second segment of spring training began with players reporting to training camp starting July 1.

Prior to the start of the regular season, each team played between 18 and 24 spring training games, from February 21 to March 12 and July 18 to July 22. There were several times during spring training where a team had two different squads playing different teams simultaneously. In addition to spring training games, teams occasionally played exhibition games with non-MLB teams, such as Minor League Baseball teams, independent teams, or college teams. These exhibition games were not counted in spring training standings. Spring training ended on July 22, the day before Opening Day.

== Standings ==
=== American League ===
AL East
Team	W	L	Pct.	GB	Home	Road
^{(1)} Tampa Bay Rays	40	20	.667	—	20‍–‍9	20‍–‍11
^{(5)} New York Yankees	33	27	.550	7	22‍–‍9	11‍–‍18
^{(8)} Toronto Blue Jays	32	28	.533	8	17‍–‍9	15‍–‍19
Baltimore Orioles	25	35	.417	15	13‍–‍20	12‍–‍15
Boston Red Sox	24	36	.400	16	11‍–‍20	13‍–‍16

AL Central
Team	W	L	Pct.	GB	Home	Road
^{(3)} Minnesota Twins	36	24	.600	—	24‍–‍7	12‍–‍17
^{(4)} Cleveland Indians	35	25	.583	1	18‍–‍12	17‍–‍13
^{(7)} Chicago White Sox	35	25	.583	1	18‍–‍12	17‍–‍13
Kansas City Royals	26	34	.433	10	15‍–‍15	11‍–‍19
Detroit Tigers	23	35	.397	12	12‍–‍15	11‍–‍20

AL West
Team	W	L	Pct.	GB	Home	Road
^{(2)} Oakland Athletics	36	24	.600	—	22‍–‍10	14‍–‍14
^{(6)} Houston Astros	29	31	.483	7	20‍–‍9	9‍–‍22
Seattle Mariners	27	33	.450	9	14‍–‍10	13‍–‍23
Los Angeles Angels	26	34	.433	10	16‍–‍15	10‍–‍19
Texas Rangers	22	38	.367	14	16‍–‍14	6‍–‍24

=== National League ===
NL East
Team	W	L	Pct.	GB	Home	Road
^{(2)} Atlanta Braves	35	25	.583	—	19‍–‍11	16‍–‍14
^{(6)} Miami Marlins	31	29	.517	4	11‍–‍15	20‍–‍14
Philadelphia Phillies	28	32	.467	7	19‍–‍13	9‍–‍19
Washington Nationals	26	34	.433	9	15‍–‍18	11‍–‍16
New York Mets	26	34	.433	9	12‍–‍17	14‍–‍17

NL Central
Team	W	L	Pct.	GB	Home	Road
^{(3)} Chicago Cubs	34	26	.567	—	19‍–‍14	15‍–‍12
^{(5)} St. Louis Cardinals	30	28	.517	3	14‍–‍13	16‍–‍15
^{(7)} Cincinnati Reds	31	29	.517	3	16‍–‍13	15‍–‍16
^{(8)} Milwaukee Brewers	29	31	.483	5	15‍–‍14	14‍–‍17
Pittsburgh Pirates	19	41	.317	15	13‍–‍19	6‍–‍22

NL West
Team	W	L	Pct.	GB	Home	Road
^{(1)} Los Angeles Dodgers	43	17	.717	—	21‍–‍9	22‍–‍8
^{(4)} San Diego Padres	37	23	.617	6	21‍–‍11	16‍–‍12
San Francisco Giants	29	31	.483	14	19‍–‍14	10‍–‍17
Colorado Rockies	26	34	.433	17	12‍–‍18	14‍–‍16
Arizona Diamondbacks	25	35	.417	18	16‍–‍14	9‍–‍21

== Postseason ==
MLB announced the playoff bracket on September 15, consisting of eight teams from each league: the top two teams from each division, plus the teams from each league with the next two best records. The Wild Card Series was a best-of-three series at the home field of the higher-seeded team, while the Division Series, League Championship Series, and World Series were their normal lengths, played at neutral sites, similar to those used for both the National Basketball Association and National Hockey League playoffs, to limit the possibility of another COVID-19 outbreak that could both disrupt the schedule and affect competitive integrity. Specifically, the American League played at the San Diego Padres' Petco Park and the Los Angeles Dodgers' Dodger Stadium, while the National League played at the Texas Rangers' Globe Life Field and the Houston Astros' Minute Maid Park, all from opposite leagues, so that no teams will play at their home ballparks in the weightiest rounds to avoid an unfair advantage. The World Series then took place at Globe Life Field.

The Milwaukee Brewers and Houston Astros became the first teams to make the postseason with a record below .500 since the 1981 Royals. Both clubs went 29–31 (.483) in the regular season. The Astros became the first, and currently only, team with a record below .500 to win a playoff series, as they defeated the Minnesota Twins in the Wild Card Series and the Oakland Athletics in the Division Series, before losing the American League Championship Series to the Tampa Bay Rays. They also became the first, and currently only, team with a record below .500 to win a playoff game, as the 1981 Royals and Brewers were swept in the first rounds they played. They also became just the second team to force a game seven after being down 3–0 to the Tampa Bay Rays in the ALCS, joining only the Boston Red Sox who ended up completing the comeback against the New York Yankees in 2004.

=== Bracket ===
Wild Card Series (ALWCS, NLWCS)	Division Series (ALDS, NLDS)
1	Tampa Bay	2
8	Toronto	0
1	Tampa Bay	3
5	NY Yankees	2
4	Cleveland	0
5	NY Yankees	2
American League
3	Minnesota	0
6	Houston	2
6	Houston	3
2	Oakland	1
2	Oakland	2
7	Chicago White Sox	1
1	LA Dodgers	2
8	Milwaukee	0
1	LA Dodgers	3
4	San Diego	0
4	San Diego	2
5	St. Louis	1
National League
3	Chicago Cubs	0
6	Miami	2
6	Miami	0
2	Atlanta	3
2	Atlanta	2
7	Cincinnati	0

League Championship Series (ALCS, NLCS)
1	Tampa Bay	4
6	Houston	3
1	LA Dodgers	4
2	Atlanta	3

World Series
AL1	Tampa Bay	2
NL1	LA Dodgers	4

== Players opting out ==
Key
*	Opted out after playing during the 2020 season
**	Player subsequently opted back in

Players who opted out of the 2020 season
Player	Position	Team
Lorenzo Cain*	Outfielder	Milwaukee
Welington Castillo	Catcher	Washington
Yoenis Céspedes*	Outfielder	New York (NL)
Tim Collins	Relief pitcher	Colorado
Ian Desmond	Outfielder	Colorado
Isan Díaz**	Second baseman	Miami
Félix Hernández	Starting pitcher	Atlanta
Jordan Hicks	Relief pitcher	St. Louis
Michael Kopech	Starting pitcher	Chicago (AL)
Mike Leake	Starting pitcher	Arizona
Francisco Liriano	Relief pitcher	Free agent
Nick Markakis**	Outfielder	Atlanta
Shelby Miller	Starting pitcher	Milwaukee
Collin McHugh	Starting pitcher	Boston
Héctor Noesí	Relief pitcher	Pittsburgh
Buster Posey	Catcher	San Francisco
David Price	Starting pitcher	Los Angeles (NL)
Joe Ross	Starting pitcher	Washington
Tyson Ross	Starting pitcher	Free agent
Andrelton Simmons*	Shortstop	Los Angeles (AL)
Kohl Stewart	Starting pitcher	Baltimore
Marcus Stroman	Starting pitcher	New York (NL)
Mark Zagunis	Outfielder	Chicago (NL)
Ryan Zimmerman	First baseman	Washington

== Managerial changes ==
=== General managers ===
==== Offseason ====
Team	Former GM	Reason For Leaving	New GM	Notes
Boston Red Sox	Dave Dombrowski	Fired	Brian O'Halloran	Dombrowski, whose title was President of Baseball Operations, was unexpectedly fired on September 9, 2019, less than one year after the Red Sox won the World Series. On October 25, 2019, the Red Sox hired the 36-year-old Chaim Bloom as Chief Baseball Officer, succeeding Dombrowski as head of their baseball operations, with Brian O'Halloran named general manager and reporting to Bloom.
Pittsburgh Pirates	Neal Huntington	Fired	Ben Cherington	Huntington was fired on October 28, 2019. Huntington had been the longest-tenured general manager in the National League, as he was hired in September 2007. The Pirates made the playoffs three times during Huntington's tenure after the 2013, 2014 and 2015 seasons. Ben Cherington was hired as the new general manager of the Pirates on November 18, 2019.
Houston Astros	Jeff Luhnow	Fired	James Click	On January 13, Luhnow was suspended for the 2020 season after the Houston Astros were involved an investigation over the use of technology to steal signs during their 2017 championship season. He was then fired by the Astros organization. James Click was named the new GM on February 3. He has spent the past 14 years in the Tampa Bay Rays front office.

=== Field managers ===
==== Offseason ====
Team	Former manager	Interim manager	Reason for leaving	New manager	Notes
San Diego Padres	Andy Green	Rod Barajas	Fired	Jayce Tingler	On September 21, 2019, Green was fired after four seasons with a record of 274–366 (.428) with no playoff appearances. Bench coach Rod Barajas was named the interim manager of the Padres for the rest of the season. Tingler was named the new manager on October 28, 2019. Tingler had spent the previous five years in the Texas Rangers organization as a coach and a front office executive.
San Francisco Giants	Bruce Bochy	N/A	Retired	Gabe Kapler	On February 18, 2019, Bochy announced he would retire following the conclusion of the 2019 season after 13 seasons. He led the Giants to three World Series championships in four playoff appearances. Bochy finished his Giants career with a 1052–1054 (.500) record. On November 12, 2019, Gabe Kapler, who managed the Philadelphia Phillies for the past two seasons, was announced as the new manager.
Kansas City Royals	Ned Yost	N/A	Retired	Mike Matheny	On September 23, 2019, Yost announced that he would retire at the end of the 2019 season. He led the Royals to consecutive World Series appearances in 2014 and 2015, winning the championship in 2015. He had been the manager since May 2010. Yost finished his career in Kansas City with a 746–839 (.471) record. On October 31, 2019, Mike Matheny, who spent last season as the special advisor to Royals general manager Dayton Moore, was named the new manager of the Kansas City Royals. Matheny managed the St. Louis Cardinals from 2012 through mid-July 2018. He had a career record of 591–474 (.555). He led the Cardinals to the postseason in his first four seasons as manager and won the National League pennant in 2013.
Chicago Cubs	Joe Maddon	N/A	Contract not renewed	David Ross	On September 29, 2019, the Cubs announced that they would not offer Maddon a contract extension following this season. He led the Cubs to four playoff appearances in five years, including the 2016 World Series championship, the Cubs' first since 1908. Maddon finished his tenure with the Cubs with a record of 471–339 (.581). Ross, who was a member of the 2016 World Series winning team under Maddon, was named as his replacement on October 24, 2019. Ross spent the last three seasons as the special assistant to baseball operations for the team as well as a baseball analyst for ESPN.
Pittsburgh Pirates	Clint Hurdle	N/A	Fired	Derek Shelton	On September 29, 2019, the Pirates announced that they dismissed Hurdle after nine seasons with a record of 735–720 (.505) with three playoff appearances. On November 27, 2019, Shelton, who spent the previous two seasons as the bench coach for the Minnesota Twins, was named the manager of the Pittsburgh Pirates. He also spent time as a hitting coach for the Cleveland Indians from 2005 to 2009 and a hitting coach for the Tampa Bay Rays from 2010 to 2016 while also serving as a quality control coach for the Toronto Blue Jays in 2017.
Los Angeles Angels	Brad Ausmus	N/A	Fired	Joe Maddon	On September 30, 2019, Ausmus was fired after one season with a record of 72–90 (.444). Ausmus served as a special assistant to the Angels general manager Billy Eppler in the 2018 season. Maddon was hired by the Angels on October 16, 2019. Maddon had spent 31 years in the Angels organization (12 years as a coach) before managing the Tampa Bay Rays for nine years and the Chicago Cubs for five years.
New York Mets	Mickey Callaway	N/A	Fired	Carlos Beltrán	On October 3, 2019, Callaway was fired after two seasons with a record of 163–161 (.503) with no playoff appearances. On November 1, 2019, Carlos Beltrán, who played for the team from 2005 to the middle of the 2011 season, was named the new manager of the team. Beltrán was a special adviser to the New York Yankees general manager Brian Cashman last season.
New York Mets	Carlos Beltrán	N/A	Mutual Decision	Luis Rojas	On January 16, Beltran and the Mets agreed to part ways before managing a game for the Mets, in light of his reported involvement in the Astros using cameras to steal signs. The Mets hired Rojas on January 22. He had spent the last 13 years in the Mets organization.
Philadelphia Phillies	Gabe Kapler	N/A	Fired	Joe Girardi	On October 10, 2019, Kapler was fired after two seasons with a record of 161–163 (.497) with no playoff appearances. Girardi, who served as a baseball analyst for the MLB Network the last two seasons, was hired as new manager on October 24, 2019. Girardi previously managed the Florida Marlins for the 2006 season and the New York Yankees from 2008 to 2017.
Houston Astros	A. J. Hinch	N/A	Fired	Dusty Baker	On January 13, Hinch was suspended by MLB for the 2020 season as part of an investigation against the Astros using hidden cameras to steal signs during their 2017 championship season; he was fired by the Astros shortly after the suspension was announced. Hinch had a regular season record of 481–329 (.594) with a total of four postseason appearances compiling a record of 28–22 (.560), two World Series appearances, and a World Series championship in 2017, throughout his tenure as Astros manager. On January 29, the Astros hired Dusty Baker to replace Hinch. He managed the San Francisco Giants from 1993 to 2002, the Chicago Cubs from 2003 to 2006, the Cincinnati Reds from 2008 to 2013, and the Washington Nationals during the 2016 and 2017 seasons. His overall managerial record is 1863–1636 (.532) in the regular season, and 23–32 (.418) in the playoffs, losing the 2002 World Series.
Boston Red Sox	Alex Cora	Ron Roenicke	Mutual Decision	Ron Roenicke	On January 14, the Red Sox and Cora officially agreed to part ways with each other after two seasons. Cora had been under investigation by MLB over the Houston Astros' use of hidden cameras to steal signs during that team's 2017 championship season (while Cora was the bench coach) as well as under investigation of allegations that the Red Sox engaged in impermissible electronic sign stealing in 2018 (while Cora was the manager). In his two seasons as Red Sox manager, he compiled a record of 192–132 (.593), winning the 2018 World Series. Roenicke was promoted from bench coach to interim manager on February 11. A longtime coach, his only managerial experience was with the Milwaukee Brewers from 2011 to 2015, compiling a record of 342–331 (.508), with one playoff appearance and a 5–6 (.455) record in the postseason. On April 22, the "interim" tag was removed from Roenicke's title, following MLB's findings about the 2018 Red Sox, which focused on the team's video replay operator.

==== In-season ====
Team	Former manager	Interim manager	Reason for leaving	New manager	Notes
Detroit Tigers	Ron Gardenhire	Lloyd McClendon	Retired	A. J. Hinch	On September 19, Gardenhire announced his immediate retirement due to health concerns. Lloyd McClendon was named interim manager for the rest of the season. Gardenhire finished his almost three-year tenure with a 132–241 (.354) record and no playoff appearances.

== League leaders ==
=== American League ===
Hitting leaders
Stat	Player	Total
AVG	DJ LeMahieu (NYY)	.364
OPS	DJ LeMahieu (NYY)	1.011
HR	Luke Voit (NYY)	22
RBI	José Abreu (CWS)	60
R	Tim Anderson (CWS); José Ramírez (CLE)	45
H	José Abreu (CWS)	76
SB	Adalberto Mondesí (KC)	24

Pitching leaders
Stat	Player	Total
W	Shane Bieber (CLE)	8
L	Matthew Boyd (DET)	7
ERA	Shane Bieber (CLE)	1.63
K	Shane Bieber (CLE)	122
IP	Lance Lynn (TEX)	84.0
SV	Brad Hand (CLE)	16
WHIP	Logan Gilbert (SEA)	0.750

=== National League ===
Hitting leaders
Stat	Player	Total
AVG	Juan Soto (WSH)	.351
OPS	Juan Soto (WSH)	1.185
HR	Marcell Ozuna (ATL)	18
RBI	Marcell Ozuna (ATL)	56
R	Freddie Freeman (ATL)	51
H	Trea Turner (WSH)	78
SB	Trevor Story (COL)	15

Pitching leaders
Stat	Player	Total
W	Yu Darvish (CHC)	8
L	Luke Weaver (AZ)	9
ERA	Trevor Bauer (CIN)	1.73
K	Jacob deGrom (NYM)	104
IP	Germán Márquez (COL)	81.2
SV	Josh Hader (MIL)	13
WHIP	Trevor Bauer (CIN)	0.795

== Milestones ==
=== Batters ===
- Aaron Judge (NYY):
  - Became the first player in Major League history to hit five go-ahead home runs in his team's first eight games.
- Mookie Betts (LAD):
  - With his three-homer game against the San Diego Padres on August 13, Betts tied the Major League record for most career three-homer games at six. He joins Sammy Sosa and Johnny Mize as the only other players to accomplish this feat.
- Yoán Moncada / Yasmani Grandal / José Abreu / Eloy Jiménez (CWS):
  - Became the 10th group of players to hit four consecutive home runs in the fifth inning on August 16 against the St. Louis Cardinals.
- Luis García Jr. (WSH):
  - Became the first Major League player born in the 2000s to hit a home run. He accomplished this feat on August 17 against the Atlanta Braves.
- José Abreu (CWS):
  - Abreu hit home runs in four consecutive at-bats over two days to tie the Major League record. Abreu hit home runs in his last three at-bats on August 22 against the Chicago Cubs and then connected on his first at-bat on August 23. Abreu's feat was the 43rd in league history.
- Ian Happ / Jason Heyward / Kyle Schwarber (CHC):
  - All three outfielders each hit two home runs on August 30 against the Cincinnati Reds. This was the first time in Major League history that a starting outfield trio had multi-homers in the same game.
- Brandon Crawford / Alex Dickerson / Donovan Solano (SF):
  - Became the first trio of teammates to record at least six RBIs in a single game since 1920 (when RBIs became a stat) on September 1 against the Colorado Rockies.
- Marcell Ozuna / Adam Duvall (ATL):
  - With Ozuna's three-homer game on September 1 and Duvall's on September 2, they became the first pair of teammates to ever produce three-homer performances in consecutive games. Both games were against the Boston Red Sox.
- Yadier Molina (STL):
  - Recorded his 2,000th career hit with a single in the seventh inning against the Milwaukee Brewers on September 24. He became the 288th player to reach this mark.
- Brett Gardner / DJ LeMahieu / Luke Voit / Giancarlo Stanton / Gleyber Torres (NYY):
  - Become the seventh group of players in Major League history to hit five home runs in one inning in the fourth inning against the Toronto Blue Jays on September 17.
- Juan Soto (WSH):
  - Became the youngest player to win the National League batting title with a .351 average.
- DJ LeMahieu (NYY):
  - Became the second player in Major League history to win a batting title in both leagues. LeMahieu won the title with the Colorado Rockies during the 2016 season. Hall-of-Famer Ed Delahanty also accomplished this feat.
- DJ LeMahieu / Luke Voit (NYY):
  - Became the first pair of teammates to lead their league in batting average and home runs since Hank Aaron and Eddie Mathews in 1959. LeMahieu recorded a batting average of .364, while Voit hit 22 home runs.
- Alex Kirilloff (MIN):
  - Made his Major League debut against the Houston Astros on September 30 during the Wild Card Series. This marks the first time a player has made his debut by starting a postseason game.
- Josh Naylor (CLE):
  - Became the first player in Major League history to record a hit in each of his first five postseason plate appearances. Naylor went 4-for-4 in Game 1 against the New York Yankees and doubled in his first at-bat in Game 2, but then flied out in his next at-bat to end the streak.
- Tim Anderson (CWS):
  - Became the first player in Major League history to record at least three hits in his first three postseason games against the Oakland Athletics in the American League Wild Card Series. Anderson is one of two players in history to have three hits in three consecutive postseason games as Lou Brock accomplished this in the 1968 World Series.
- Wil Myers / Fernando Tatis Jr. (SD):
  - Myers and Tatis Jr. became the second pair of teammates in Major League history to each hit two home runs in a postseason game in Game 2 of the National League Wild Card Series against the St. Louis Cardinals on October 1. They join Babe Ruth and Lou Gehrig who did this in the 1932 World Series.
- Ronald Acuña Jr. (ATL):
  - The 22-year-old became the youngest player to hit a leadoff homer in the postseason against the Miami Marlins in Game 1 of the National League Division Series on October 6.
- Will Smith (LAD):
  - With his five-hit performance on October 8 in Game 3 against the San Diego Padres in the National League Division Series, Smith became the youngest player in Major League postseason history to accomplish this feat. This was also the ninth time that a five-hit game was achieved in a postseason game.
- Randy Arozarena (TB):
  - Hit his seventh home run of the postseason in Game 7 against the Houston Astros in the American League Championship Series (ALCS) which set a Major League record for most home runs in the postseason by a rookie. Arozarena also won the Most Valuable Player of the ALCS and became the first rookie position player to receive the honor.

=== Pitchers ===
==== No-hitters ====
- Lucas Giolito (CWS):
  - Threw his first career no-hitter, and the 19th in franchise history, by defeating the Pittsburgh Pirates 4–0 on August 25. Giolito struck out 13 and walked one, throwing 74 of his 101 pitches for strikes.
- Alec Mills (CHC):
  - Threw his first career no-hitter, and the 16th in franchise history, by defeating the Milwaukee Brewers 12–0 on September 13. Mills struck out five and walked three, throwing 114 pitches with 74 of them being strikes.

==== Other pitching accomplishments ====
- Shane Bieber (CLE):
  - Tied the Major League record for most strikeouts in his first two starts of a season after his performance against the Minnesota Twins on July 30. His 27 strikeouts tied the record that was set in 1954 by Karl Spooner of the Brooklyn Dodgers.
  - Set the modern Major League record (since 1900) for starters for the fewest innings to record 100 strikeouts, doing so in 62 1/3 innings. The previous record was 63, set by Max Scherzer in 2018.
- Tyler Alexander (DET):
  - Set the Major League record for relievers and tied the American League record for any pitcher by recording nine consecutive strikeouts against the Cincinnati Reds on August 2. He tied the American League record set by starter Doug Fister during the 2012 season.
- Rick Porcello (NYM):
  - Recorded his 150th career win with a victory against the Washington Nationals on August 5. He became the 263rd player to reach this mark.
- Zac Gallen (AZ):
  - Set the Major League record for most consecutive starts starting a career giving up three earned runs or less in each game at 22 with his outing on August 28 against the San Francisco Giants. He broke the record that was set by Aaron Sele. His streak came to an end at 23 games after giving up four earned runs on September 7 against the San Francisco Giants.
- Josh Hader (MIL):
  - With his hitless appearance on September 2 against the Detroit Tigers, Hader set a Major League record with his 12th straight hitless game to start a season. This broke the record that was held by Justin Wilson in 2017, Scott Aldred in 1999 and John Franco in 1987. Hader's streak ended the next game when Oscar Mercado doubled to lead off the inning on September 5.
- Clayton Kershaw (LAD):
  - Recorded his 2,500th career strikeout on September 3 against the Arizona Diamondbacks when he struck out Nick Ahmed in the third inning. He became the 39th player, and third-youngest, to reach this mark.

=== Miscellaneous ===
- Toronto Blue Jays:
  - Became the first team in Major League history to lose a game in which they recorded at least 18 hits and seven home runs on August 12 against the Miami Marlins.
- Chicago White Sox:
  - Hit four consecutive home runs against the St. Louis Cardinals on August 16, tying the Major League record. This was the second time in White Sox history and tenth in Major League history. The group of Yoan Moncada, Yasmani Grandal, José Abreu and Eloy Jiménez accomplished this feat, with all four home runs hit off Roel Ramírez in his debut. The White Sox also had four consecutive home runs on August 14, 2008, against the Kansas City Royals.
  - Became the first team in Major League history to hit back-to-back home runs to lead off the game twice off the same pitcher in the same season. On August 12, Tim Anderson and Eloy Jiménez hit the leadoff back-to-back home runs against Matthew Boyd of the Detroit Tigers. Then on August 17, Anderson and Yoan Moncada hit the leadoff home runs.
  - Became the first team in Major League history to go undefeated against left-handed pitchers with a record of 14–0.
- San Diego Padres:
  - Became the first team in Major League history to hit at least one grand slam in each of four consecutive games from August 17 to 20. All such grand slams came against the Texas Rangers.
- Joe Girardi (PHI):
  - Recorded his 1,000th win as a manager when the Phillies defeated the Washington Nationals on August 26. Girardi became the 65th manager to reach this mark. He did so in 1,808 games.
- Los Angeles Dodgers:
  - Set the National League record for most home runs in a month by hitting their 57th during August against the Texas Rangers on August 30.
  - Set the Major League record for most runs in a single inning in a postseason game by scoring 11 runs in the first inning of Game 3 of the 2020 National League Championship Series against the Atlanta Braves on October 14.
- Atlanta Braves:
  - Set a National League record for runs scored in a game in the modern era (since 1900) with a 29–9 win over the Miami Marlins on September 9. The Braves broke the record of 28 that was set in 1929 by the St. Louis Cardinals. Among these runs, 18 were home runs, tying the Major League record.
  - Set the Major League record for consecutive scoreless innings to begin a postseason series at 22 innings with their 13-inning Game 1 shutout and Game 2 series-clinching shutout.
- New York Yankees:
  - Became the first team in Major League history with six or more home runs in three consecutive games from September 15 to 17 against the Toronto Blue Jays. Their 19 home runs in that same span is also a record.
- Dusty Baker (HOU):
  - With the Astros making it to the postseason, Baker became the first manager in Major League history to lead five different teams to the playoffs.
- Cincinnati Reds / Atlanta Braves:
  - The Reds–Braves Game 1 scoreless duel through 12 innings set a Major League record for the longest postseason game without either team scoring a run. It broke the record of ten innings that was achieved on four separate occasions.
- New York Yankees / Cleveland Indians:
  - Game 2 of their American League Wild Card Series on September 30, which the Yankees won 10–9, lasted four hours and 50 minutes (not counting the two rain delays), making it the longest nine-inning game in Major League history.
- Tampa Bay Rays:
  - Set a Major League postseason record of strikeouts in a nine-inning game by fanning 18 New York Yankees in Game 2 of their American League Division Series on October 6.
- Houston Astros / Oakland Athletics:
  - Set the Major League record for most postseason home runs in a series of five games or fewer by hitting 24 in their American League Division Series. Each team hit 12 home runs, also a division series record.
- Houston Astros:
  - Became the first team in postseason history to hit a leadoff home run and walk-off home run in the same game, with the former hit by George Springer and the latter by Carlos Correa. They beat the Tampa Bay Rays in Game 5 of the American League Championship Series.
  - Became the second team in Major League History to force a Game 7 after losing the first three games. Houston lost the first three games of the ALCS to the Tampa Bay Rays, before forcing Game 7. The 2004 Boston Red Sox accomplished this in the ALCS against the New York Yankees and won Game 7. However, the Astros were not able to duplicate the Red Sox.

== Awards and honors ==
=== Regular season ===
Baseball Writers' Association of America Awards
BBWAA Award	National League	American League
Rookie of the Year	Devin Williams (MIL)	Kyle Lewis (SEA)
Cy Young Award	Trevor Bauer (CIN)	Shane Bieber (CLE)
Manager of the Year	Don Mattingly (MIA)	Kevin Cash (TB)
Most Valuable Player	Freddie Freeman (ATL)	José Abreu (CWS)
Gold Glove Awards
Position	National League	American League
Pitcher	Max Fried (ATL)	Griffin Canning (LAA)
Catcher	Tucker Barnhart (CIN)	Roberto Pérez (CLE)
1st Base	Anthony Rizzo (CHC)	Evan White (SEA)
2nd Base	Kolten Wong (STL)	César Hernández (CLE)
3rd Base	Nolan Arenado (COL)	Isiah Kiner-Falefa (TEX)
Shortstop	Javier Báez (CHC)	J. P. Crawford (SEA)
Left field	Tyler O'Neill (STL)	Alex Gordon (KC)
Center field	Trent Grisham (SD)	Luis Robert (CWS)
Right field	Mookie Betts (LAD)	Joey Gallo (TEX)
Silver Slugger Awards
Designated Hitter	Marcell Ozuna (ATL)	Nelson Cruz (MIN)
Catcher	Travis d'Arnaud (ATL)	Salvador Pérez (KC)
1st Base	Freddie Freeman (ATL)	Jose Abreu (CWS)
2nd Base	Donovan Solano (SF)	DJ LeMahieu (NYY)
3rd Base	Manny Machado (SD)	José Ramírez (CLE)
Shortstop	Fernando Tatís Jr. (SD)	Tim Anderson (CWS)
Outfield	Ronald Acuña Jr. (ATL); Mookie Betts (LAD); Juan Soto (WSH)	Teoscar Hernández (TOR); Eloy Jiménez (CWS); Mike Trout (LAA)

=== All-MLB Team ===
Players are selected through fan votes (50%) and votes from a panel of experts (50%). The winners are selected based on merit, with no set number of nominees per position and no distinction between leagues.

All-MLB Team
Position	First Team	Second Team
Starting pitcher	Trevor Bauer (CIN)	Gerrit Cole (NYY)
Starting pitcher	Shane Bieber (CLE)	Clayton Kershaw (LAD)
Starting pitcher	Yu Darvish (CHC)	Dinelson Lamet (SD)
Starting pitcher	Jacob deGrom (NYM)	Kenta Maeda (MIN)
Starting pitcher	Max Fried (ATL)	Hyun-jin Ryu (TOR)
Relief pitcher	Nick Anderson (TB)	Brad Hand (CLE)
Relief pitcher	Liam Hendriks (OAK)	Devin Williams (MIL)
Designated hitter	Marcell Ozuna (ATL)	Nelson Cruz (MIN)
Catcher	Salvador Pérez (KC)	J. T. Realmuto (PHI)
1st Base	Freddie Freeman (ATL)	José Abreu (CWS)
2nd Base	DJ LeMahieu (NYY)	Brandon Lowe (TB)
3rd Base	Manny Machado (SD)	José Ramírez (CLE)
Shortstop	Fernando Tatís Jr. (SD)	Corey Seager (LAD)
Outfield	Mookie Betts (LAD)	Ronald Acuña Jr. (ATL)
Outfield	Juan Soto (WSH)	Michael Conforto (NYM)
Outfield	Mike Trout (LAA)	Mike Yastrzemski (SF)

=== Other awards ===
- The Sporting News Player of the Year Award: José Abreu (CWS)
- Comeback Players of the Year: Salvador Pérez (KC, American); Daniel Bard (COL, National)
- Edgar Martínez Award (Best designated hitter): Marcell Ozuna (ATL)
- Hank Aaron Award: José Abreu (CWS, American); Freddie Freeman (ATL, National)
- Roberto Clemente Award (Humanitarian): Adam Wainwright (STL)
- Mariano Rivera AL Reliever of the Year Award (Best AL reliever): Liam Hendriks (OAK)
- Trevor Hoffman NL Reliever of the Year Award (Best NL reliever): Devin Williams (MIL)
- Warren Spahn Award (Best left-handed pitcher): Hyun-jin Ryu (TOR)

Fielding Bible Awards
Position	Player
Pitcher	Max Fried
Catcher	Roberto Pérez
1st Base	Matt Olson
2nd Base	Kolten Wong
3rd Base	Nolan Arenado
Shortstop	Javier Báez
Left Field	Tyler O'Neill
Center Field	Kevin Kiermaier
Right Field	Mookie Betts
Multi-position	Kiké Hernández

=== Monthly awards ===
==== Player of the Month ====
Month	American League	National League
July/August	José Abreu	Fernando Tatis Jr.
September	José Ramírez	Freddie Freeman

==== Pitcher of the Month ====
Month	American League	National League
July/August	Shane Bieber	Yu Darvish
September	Chris Bassitt	Trevor Bauer

==== Rookie of the Month ====
Month	American League	National League
July/August	Luis Robert	Jake Cronenworth
September	Jared Walsh	Ke'Bryan Hayes

==== Reliever of the Month ====
Month	American League	National League
July/August	Liam Hendriks	Kenley Jansen
September	Mike Mayers	Devin Williams

== Payroll ==
Team name	Wins	%±	Est. payroll	%±
New York Yankees	33	−68.0%	$218,635,714	−4.3%
Houston Astros	29	−72.9%	$217,000,000	30.7%
Los Angeles Dodgers	43	−59.4%	$216,508,333	11.9%
Chicago Cubs	34	−59.5%	$181,560,000	−17.6%
Los Angeles Angels	26	−63.9%	$181,254,762	14.7%
Washington Nationals	26	−72.0%	$172,237,283	−15.2%
Boston Red Sox	24	−71.4%	$171,984,429	−21.5%
Philadelphia Phillies	28	−65.4%	$170,148,461	20.0%
New York Mets	26	−69.8%	$162,078,667	4.7%
St. Louis Cardinals	30	−67.0%	$153,396,167	−4.8%
San Francisco Giants	29	−62.3%	$152,957,778	−12.8%
Colorado Rockies	26	−63.4%	$144,730,000	−0.4%
San Diego Padres	37	−47.1%	$141,953,667	57.3%
Minnesota Twins	36	−64.4%	$134,838,333	18.5%
Atlanta Braves	35	−63.9%	$130,705,000	−1.9%
Texas Rangers	22	−71.8%	$122,326,667	17.1%
Cincinnati Reds	31	−58.7%	$120,781,165	10.1%
Chicago White Sox	35	−51.4%	$119,066,333	47.3%
Milwaukee Brewers	29	−67.4%	$103,541,667	−19.6%
Cleveland Indians	35	−62.4%	$101,991,668	−32.6%
Seattle Mariners	27	−60.3%	$92,310,000	−27.2%
Detroit Tigers	23	−51.1%	$88,385,000	−12.2%
Arizona Diamondbacks	25	−70.6%	$88,176,667	−28.9%
Oakland Athletics	36	−62.9%	$85,683,333	−16.8%
Toronto Blue Jays	32	−52.2%	$76,078,572	22.4%
Kansas City Royals	26	−55.9%	$68,600,000	−30.1%
Miami Marlins	31	−45.6%	$68,450,000	−8.3%
Tampa Bay Rays	40	−58.3%	$56,351,667	−1.3%
Baltimore Orioles	25	−53.7%	$52,190,000	−36.9%
Pittsburgh Pirates	19	−72.5%	$49,628,500	−31.9%

== Uniforms ==
On January 25, 2019, MLB announced that Nike would become the new exclusive uniform supplier for all MLB teams, under a 10-year deal beginning in 2020. Fanatics would oversee production of on-field and retail MLB uniforms licensed by Nike. Under Armour backed out of its existing supply agreement as a cost-cutting measure.

=== Anniversaries and special events ===
Team	Special occasion
All Teams	#42 patch for Jackie Robinson Day (scheduled for April 15; tribute converted to virtual experience on MLB.com/MLB Network; held August 28)
All Teams	100th anniversary of the Negro leagues (August 16)
All Teams	Gold Ribbons for childhood cancer (August 28)
All Teams	Patches for Black Lives Matter (Opening Day)
Chicago White Sox	"Farmio" patch in memory of radio broadcaster and former pitcher Ed Farmer
Detroit	#6 patch in memory of Al Kaline
Kansas City	"DG" patch in memory of former owner David Glass
Milwaukee	50th Anniversary in Milwaukee
Minnesota	60th season in the Twin Cities
Minnesota	"RC" patch in memory of Minor League player Ryan Costello (July 24)
New York Mets	#41 patch in memory of Tom Seaver
New York Yankees	"HGS" patch in memory of Hank Steinbrenner
New York Yankees	#16 patch in memory of Whitey Ford (October 9)
St. Louis	#20 patch in memory of Lou Brock
San Francisco	"20 at 24" 20th anniversary of Oracle Park (24 refers to the address of the park, 24 Willie Mays Plaza)
Texas	First season at Globe Life Field
Toronto	#1 patch in memory of Tony Fernández
Washington	2019 World Series championship (July 23, initially scheduled for April 2)

Wholesale changes

Arizona tweaked their uniforms, including removing the darker away uniforms and the diamond pattern on the uniforms.

Cincinnati added a new alternate jersey and a new spring training jersey.

Milwaukee introduced new uniforms, including a return to the ball-in-glove logo used as their primary logo from 1978 to 1993. They also switched out their gold color to yellow.

Minnesota added a new alternate uniform, utilizing its powder blue 1973–1986 road uniform design.

Pittsburgh brought back the script "Pittsburgh" from the 1990s on new alternate and road uniforms, along with a gold outlined "P" on their caps.

Texas introduced a new powder blue jersey along with a powder blue hat. It also changed the "Texas" wordmark to "Rangers" wordmark on the white jersey and revealed a new red hat with the state of Texas on it with "TX."

Toronto added a new alternate based on its 1979–1988 powder blue road jerseys.

Washington added two new alternate hats and one alternate white jersey.

San Diego changed its primary colors from navy blue to brown and gold, the team's primary colors from 1969 to 1984.

St. Louis made changes to its logo as it appears on the caps.

Throwbacks

The Cardinals and Royals wore Negro leagues throwbacks September 22. The Cardinals wore 1930 St. Louis Stars uniforms, and the Royals wore 1945 Kansas City Monarchs uniforms.

== Venues ==
This is the Texas Rangers' first season at Globe Life Field, replacing Globe Life Park in Arlington where they played from 1994 to 2019. Their first game was July 24 against the Colorado Rockies.

The Miami Marlins converted Marlins Park from a natural grass surface to Shaw Sports B1K artificial turf and the field's fences were moved inwards.

The Atlanta Braves' SunTrust Park was renamed Truist Park after SunTrust Banks merged with BB&T Bank to make Truist Financial.

=== Temporary relocation of the Toronto Blue Jays ===
On July 18, the Canadian federal government denied the Toronto Blue Jays exceptions to the Quarantine Act to play regular season home games at Rogers Centre this season. Although they were allowed to conduct training camp with stricter protocols than those mandated by MLB, Minister of Immigration, Refugees and Citizenship Marco Mendicino cited that repeated cross-border travel by players would carry a major risk due to the higher number of COVID-19 cases in the U.S. Mendicino did not rule out the permission being granted for postseason games, depending on the status of the pandemic in the U.S. by then, however the Blue Jays would not have any home postseason games.

On July 20, the Pittsburgh Pirates offered the use of PNC Park as a site for Blue Jays home games. However, health officials in Pennsylvania denied permission for this arrangement, citing concerns over additional travel to and from Pittsburgh amid an increase in local cases.

On July 24, the Blue Jays announced that they would play the majority of their home games at Sahlen Field in Buffalo, New York, home of the Jays' AAA affiliate, the Buffalo Bisons. The Jays' first game in Buffalo was August 11 against the Miami Marlins. The Jays' first two home series against the Washington Nationals and Philadelphia Phillies were relocated to the visiting teams' venues, Nationals Park and Citizens Bank Park, respectively, with the Jays as designated home team. However, the Phillies series was postponed and made up in Buffalo.

== Broadcast rights ==
=== Television ===
==== National ====
This was the seventh year of the current eight-year deals with Fox, ESPN, and TBS. Fox was to televise the MLB at Field of Dreams game on August 13. FS1 televised games on Tuesday nights and on Saturdays both during the afternoon and night. ESPN televised games on its flagship telecast Sunday Night Baseball as well as Monday and Wednesday nights. Fox and ESPN Sunday Night Baseball telecasts were exclusive; all other national telecasts were subject to local blackout.

TBS televised one AL Wild Card Series, both American League Division Series matchups and the American League Championship Series. ESPN televised seven of the eight Wild Card Series with live look-ins and alternate broadcasts on ESPN+. On September 28, it was announced that ABC would broadcast at least four of ESPN's Wild Card Series games, marking the first time a national MLB game had aired on ABC since 1995 (via the ill-fated The Baseball Network arrangement). FS1 and MLB Network televised both National League Division Series matchups. Fox and FS1 televised the National League Championship Series, and the World Series was on Fox for the 21st straight year.

==== Local ====
- In Chicago, new television deals resulted in the end of free-to-air regional telecasts for the city's two franchises. In February, the Cubs launched the team-owned Marquee Sports Network, a joint venture with Sinclair Broadcast Group. The White Sox signed exclusively with NBC Sports Chicago under a multi-year deal.
- In November 2019, MLB owners voted unanimously to revert "certain in-market digital [streaming] rights" to the teams themselves.
- On April 1, the Los Angeles Dodgers' Spectrum SportsNet LA reached a carriage deal with AT&T (covering AT&T TV, U-verse, and DirecTV), concluding a seven-year impasse that had hindered the network's local availability.
- Long-time Cincinnati Reds television play-by-play announcer Thom Brennaman resigned on September 26 after he was caught using a homophobic slur in a game on August 19 against the Kansas City Royals. Sideline host Jim Day took over Brennaman's duties for the rest of the season, beginning August 20.

=== Radio ===
==== National ====
- ESPN Radio will air its 23rd season of national coverage, including Sunday Night Baseball, Saturday Games, Opening Day, Labor Day games, and the entire Major League Baseball postseason.

==== Local ====
- The Oakland Athletics were briefly the first MLB team to abandon terrestrial radio in their primary market in favor of internet radio; the team initially carried games on TuneIn via the "A's Cast" channel, with plans for some games to be aired without commercial interruptions. The decision was prompted by competition with other local sports teams for time on stations, resulting in frequent pre-emptions and lowered priorities, and conflicts with regular station programming. The broadcasts were still carried on some terrestrial radio stations outside the Bay Area (with the closest being Sacramento's KHTK). However, on July 30, 2020, it was reported that the team had backed out of the arrangement and signed with iHeartMedia to make 960 KNEW the team's flagship station (with its streaming platform shifting to iHeartRadio), beginning July 31. Team president Dave Kaval cited people having become "budget-conscious" due to the pandemic as having influenced the decision.
- Entercom's KMNB/Minneapolis will join WCCO as the FM flagship for the Minnesota Twins in an extension of rights until the 2023 season.
- Chicago White Sox radio play-by-play announcer Ed Farmer, a former pitcher for the team who had been part of the team's radio broadcast staff since 1991, died on April 1 after a long-term battle with polycystic kidney disease. On June 30, the team and its radio network named Andy Masur (the former pre-game host) as Farmer's successor.

=== Impact of the COVID-19 pandemic on production ===
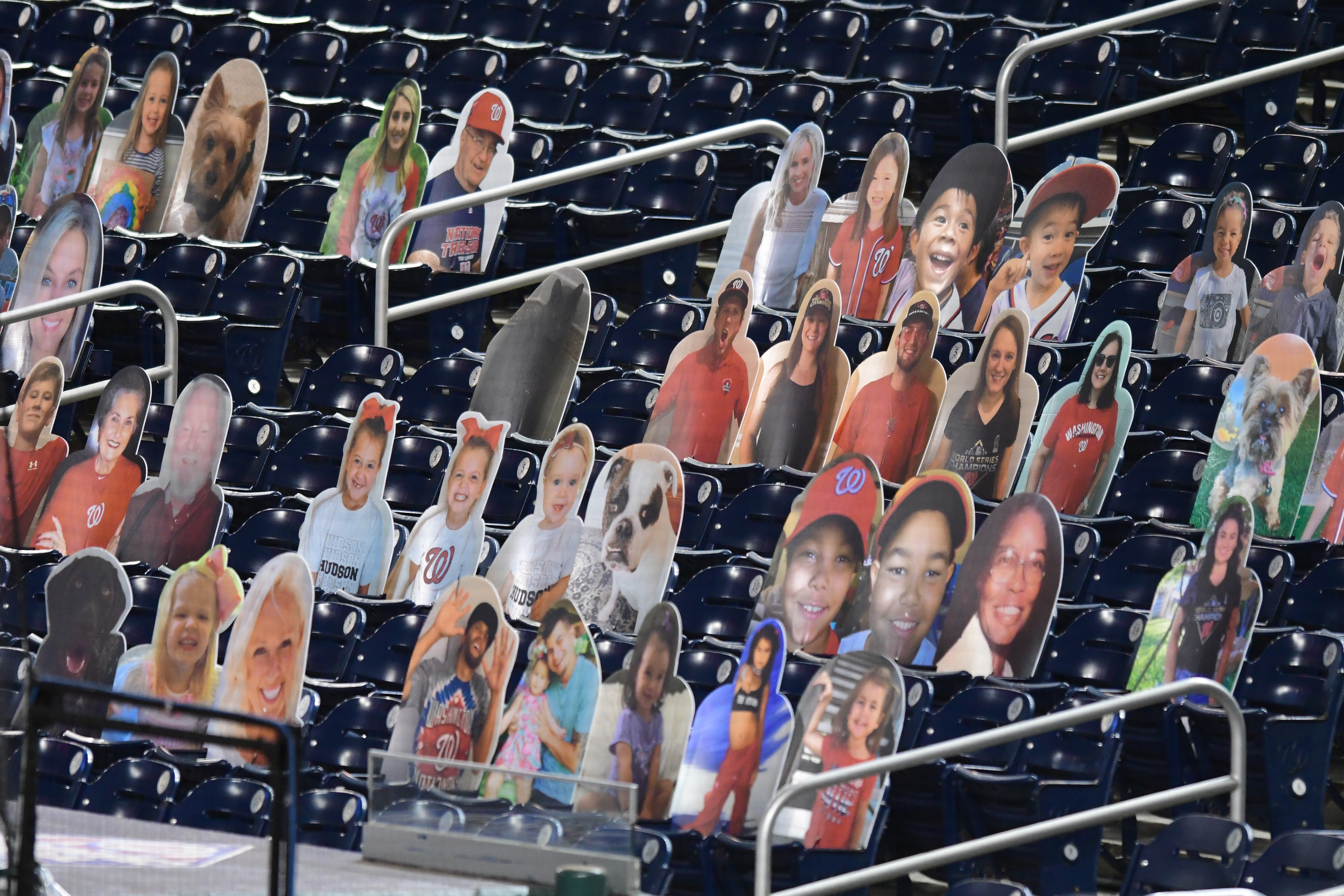
Cutout images of Washington Nationals fans placed in Nationals Park seats in August 2020

In order to reduce avoidable travel and the number of personnel on-site for each game, most MLB broadcasters commentated away games remotely from either their broadcaster's studio, or their home stadium's broadcast booths. MLB safety protocols mandated remote broadcasts for away games on television, but radio broadcasters were allowed to be present on-site for away games if they so chose. Some teams had their commentators on-site for home games only, and called away games from their studio.

Furthermore, the home team's local television rightsholder served as the host broadcaster for each game, providing a neutral video feed to media partners (including the away team's local rightsholder, and in some cases, a national broadcaster), which added commentary, graphics, and other surrounding coverage for their audience. MLB Network assisted with providing and using existing infrastructure for this arrangement. Audio from Sony Interactive Entertainment's MLB: The Show video game franchise was used as artificial crowd noise for all games, and was played over the stadiums' audio systems on-site.

Fox announced plans to use augmented reality "virtual fans" in its games, while ESPN leveraged experience from its remote broadcasts of KBO League games over the suspended pre-season.

The pandemic also led to changes in broadcast arrangements for several teams:

- Due to health risks, the Baltimore Orioles announced that Gary Thorne and Jim Palmer could not call its games for MASN this season. Local sports radio personality Scott Garceau replaced Thorne on play-by-play; in 2021, the team would not renew the contracts of Thorne, Jim Hunter, or analysts Mike Bordick and Rick Dempsey, with Garceau remaining part of the revamped team.
- Sportsnet's Toronto Blue Jays color commentator Pat Tabler (who is a U.S. citizen) took on a reduced analyst role this season, leaving the team's alternate commentary team of Dan Shulman (play-by-play) and Buck Martinez (color; he normally performs play-by-play on games where Shulman is not present) for all regular-season games. Due to his commitments to ESPN Radio coverage, Shulman was replaced by Joe Siddall for Toronto's Wild Card Series games.
- Prior to the pandemic, the San Francisco Giants and NBC Sports Bay Area had already planned to have color commentator Mike Krukow broadcast 22 NL West road games remotely from the network's studios (with his play-by-play partner Duane Kuiper commentating on-site as normal) to accommodate his inclusion body myositis, which had made him unfit to travel. The need for this arrangement was ultimately rendered moot, with Krukow and Kuiper calling all Giants' games together from booths at Oracle Park.
- On July 31, Texas Rangers radio voice Matt Hicks tested positive for COVID-19. His partner Eric Nadel subsequently opted out from broadcasting that weekend's games. After television voice C. J. Nitkowski tested positive in mid-September, Fox Sports Southwest switched to using a simulcast of the radio broadcast.

== Retirements ==
The following players retired during the 2020 season and before the start of 2021 campaign:

- Alex Wilson – July 28
- José Reyes – July 29
- Chris Iannetta – August 8
- Ubaldo Jiménez – September 17
- Alex Gordon – September 24 retired at the end of the season
- Hunter Pence – September 26
- Francisco Cervelli – October 3
- Hisashi Iwakuma – October 20. Retired at the end of the 2020 Nippon Professional Baseball season
- Kyuji Fujikawa – November 10
- Yonder Alonso – November 20
- Howie Kendrick – December 21
- Phil Hughes – January 3, 2021
- Branden Kline – January 13, 2021
- Danny Hultzen – January 14, 2021
- Daniel Murphy – January 29, 2021
- Dustin Pedroia – February 1, 2021
- Josh Phegley – February 3, 2021
- Jared Hughes – February 14, 2021
- Nate Orf – February 16, 2021
- Cody Allen – February 17, 2021
- Tim Tebow – February 17, 2021
- Brian Dozier – February 18, 2021
- Kelvin Herrera – February 26, 2021
- Tim Dillard – March 10, 2021
- Nick Markakis – March 12, 2021
- Dan Otero – March 22
- Gio Gonzalez – March 25, 2021

== Retired numbers ==
- Dick Allen had his #15 retired on September 3 by the Philadelphia Phillies. He is the seventh player to have his number retired by the franchise.

Due to the delayed start of the season caused by the COVID-19 pandemic, the following retirement ceremonies were postponed and rescheduled to either 2021 or 2022.

Player	No.	Team	Original Date	New Date	Ref
Larry Walker	33	Colorado Rockies	April 19	September 25, 2021	
Dave Stewart	34	Oakland Athletics	May 23	September 11, 2022	
Roy Halladay	34	Philadelphia Phillies	May 29	August 8, 2021	
Jerry Koosman	36	New York Mets	June 13	August 28, 2021	
Will Clark	22	San Francisco Giants	July 11	July 30, 2022	
Lou Whitaker	1	Detroit Tigers	August 29	August 6, 2022	

== Major League Baseball teams revenue losses for 2020 ==
For 2020 Team Marketing Report calculated $5 billion in game day losses for Major League Baseball as a result of not having fans in attendance.

== See also ==
- 2020 in baseball
- 2020 KBO League season
- 2020 Nippon Professional Baseball season
- 2020 Chinese Professional Baseball League season
- Impact of the COVID-19 pandemic on baseball
