= Estadio Alfredo Harp Helú =

Baseball stadium in Mexico City

- Diamante de Fuego

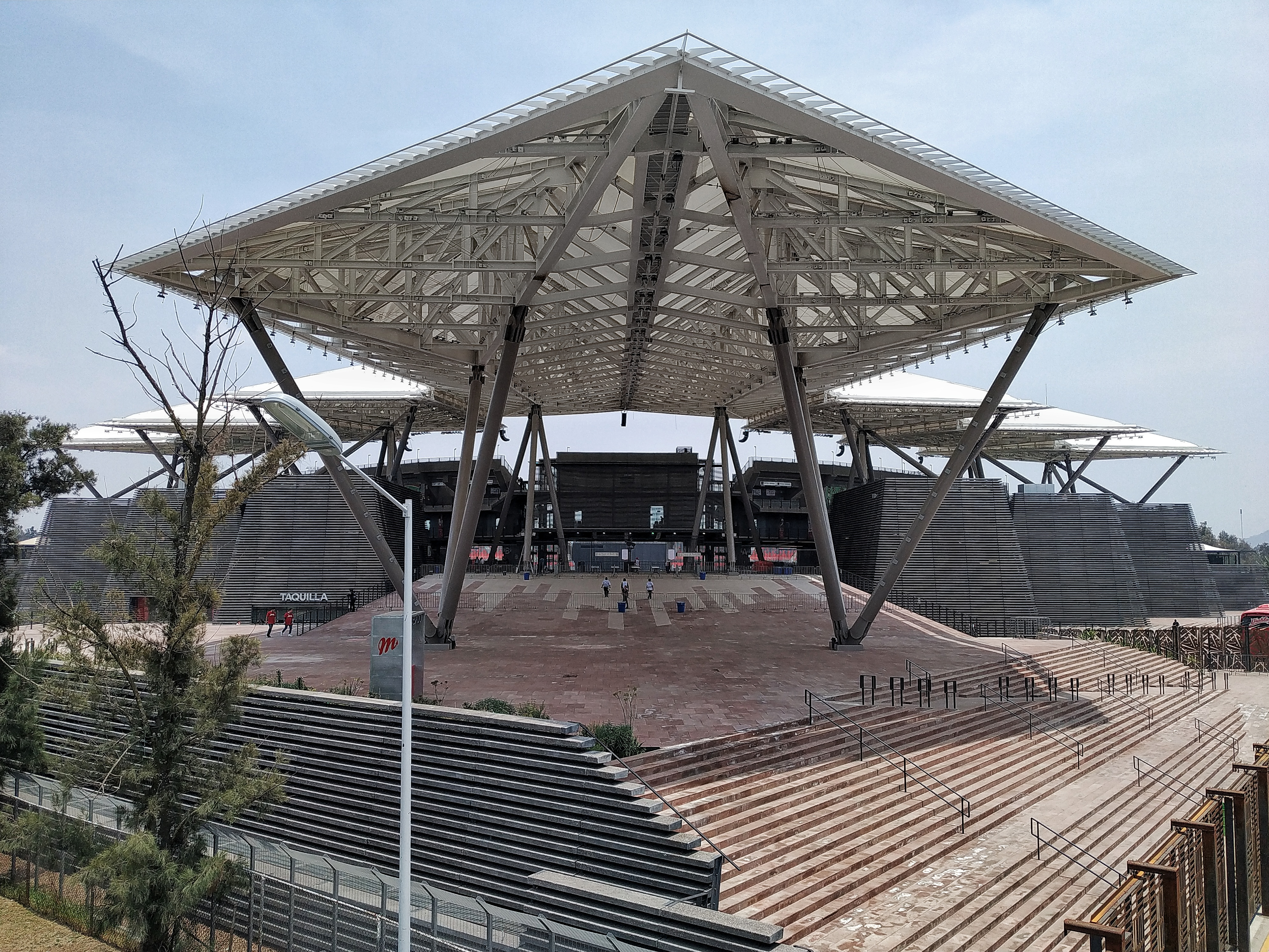
- Interactive map of Estadio Alfredo Harp Helú
- Address: Av. Viaducto Río de la Piedad, Granjas México, Iztacalco, Mexico City, Mexico
- Coordinates: 19.404°N 99.0855°W
- Capacity: 20,062
- Surface: Artificial turf
- Field size: Left field: 332 feet (101 m); Center field: 410 feet (120 m); Right field: 332 feet (101 m)
- Public transit: Ciudad Deportiva; Puebla

Construction
- Opened: 23 March 2019
- Cost: Mex$3 billion
- Architects: FGP Atelier & Taller ADG

Tenant
- Diablos Rojos del México (2019–present)

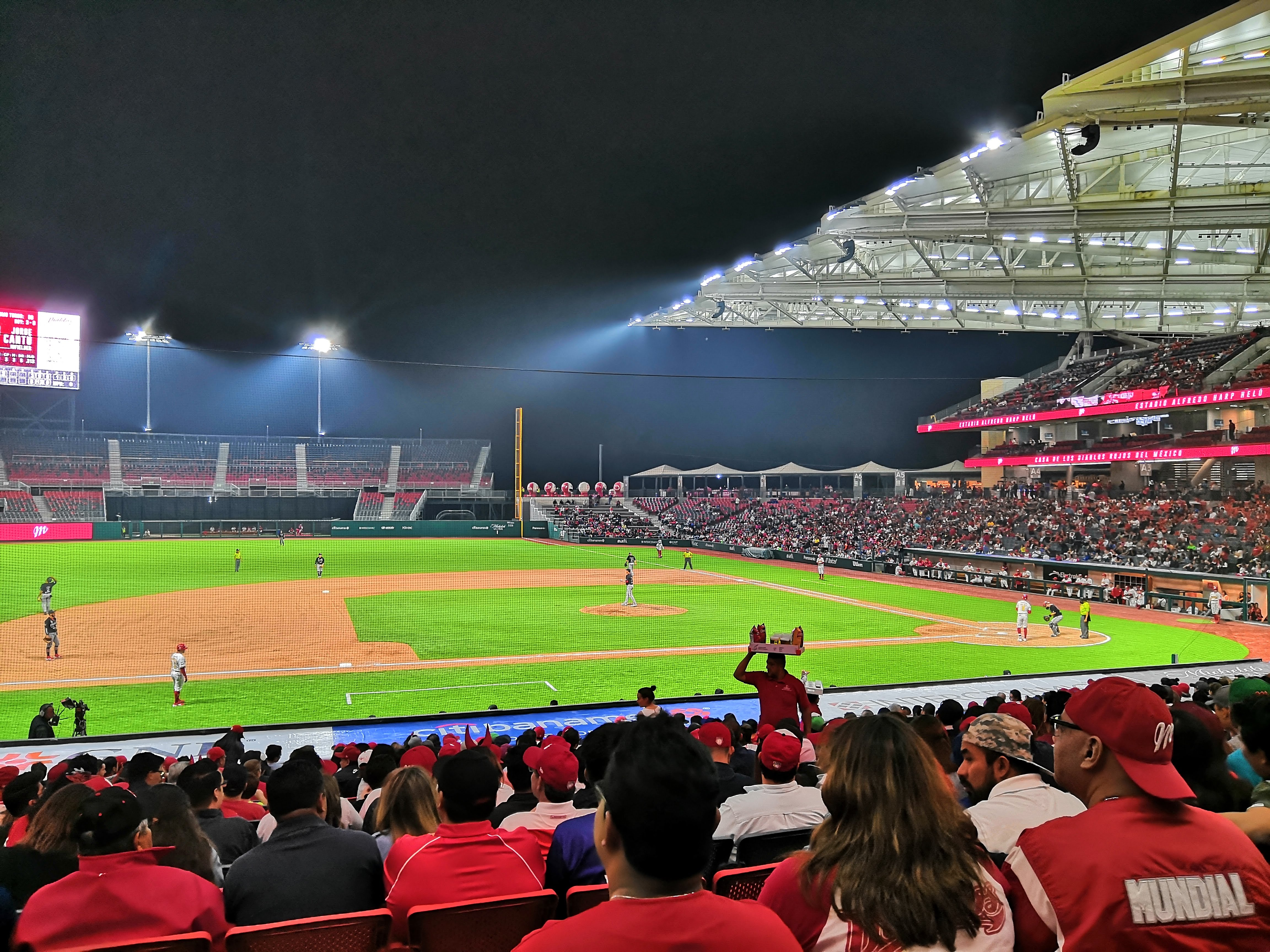
Interior of the stadium

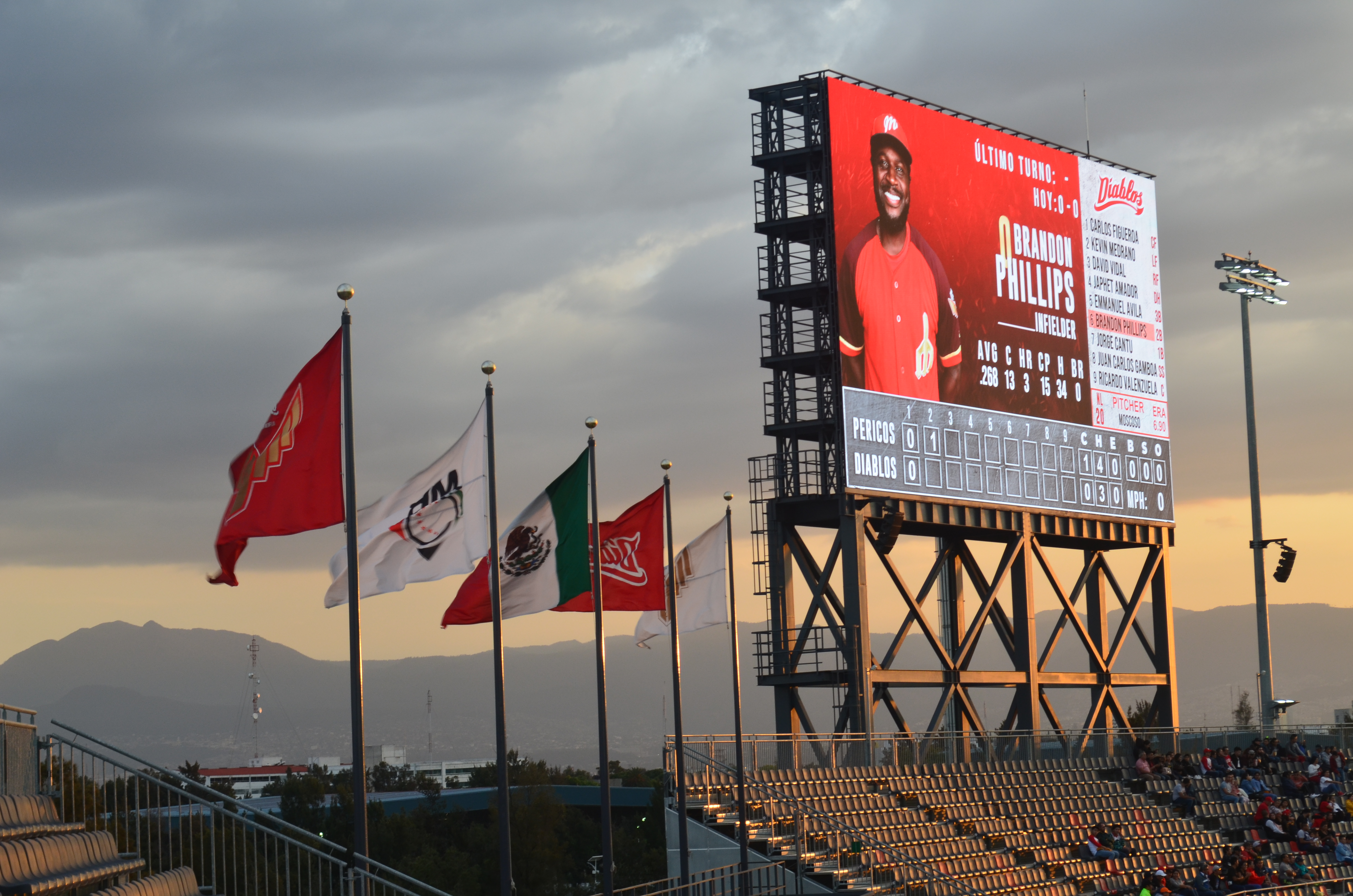
Stadium scoreboard in center field

Estadio Alfredo Harp Helú (English: Alfredo Harp Helú Stadium) is a baseball stadium in Mexico City, located within the Magdalena Mixhuca Sports City in the Iztacalco borough. It is the ballpark of Mexican League's Diablos Rojos del México. Inaugurated on 23 March 2019, the stadium has a capacity of 20,062 seats.

The stadium hosts the MLB Mexico City Series. In December 2019, Major League Baseball (MLB) announced it would hold two games at the stadium in April 2020 between the San Diego Padres and the Arizona Diamondbacks. These games were cancelled due to the COVID-19 pandemic. The first MLB games played at the stadium were on 29 and 30 April 2023 between the San Diego Padres and the San Francisco Giants. These were the first regular season MLB games in Mexico City.

The ballpark was named for the Diablos Rojos owner Alfredo Harp Helú and it is nicknamed Diamante de Fuego (English: The Fire Diamond).

== History ==
=== Background ===
From 1955 until 2000, the Diablos Rojos del México played at the Parque Deportivo del Seguro Social, which they shared with the Tigres de México. In 1999, the Mexican Social Security Institute, owner of the ballpark, decided to sell the stadium. Despite the offer of the Diablos and Tigres owners to buy the Parque del Seguro Social, a larger sum of money was offered by Autocamiones Central, a Ford authorized dealer, who planned to turn the place into a car dealership. The stadium was later sold to Supermercados Gigante, a supermarket chain, demolished and turned into a shopping mall named Parque Delta. Diablos and Tigres played a doubleheader on 1 June 2000; the last time that baseball was played at the Parque del Seguro Social.

After the demolition of the Parque Deportivo del Seguro Social, Diablos and Tigres were forced to find another ballpark and moved to the Foro Sol, a ballpark located inside the Autódromo Hermanos Rodríguez, to host their local games. Foro Sol, opened as a baseball park on 2 June 2000, with the second game of the series between Tigres and Diablos. For the 2002 season, Tigres left Mexico City and moved to Puebla, leaving the Diablos as the sole tenants of the Foro Sol.

In June 2010, the announcement of the construction of a new baseball stadium for the Diablos was made by Marcelo Ebrard, Head of Government of the Federal District from 2006 to 2012, and Alfredo Harp Helú, owner of the Diablos Rojos. According to Ebrard, construction was scheduled to begin in September 2010. Two locations were selected as possible options for the new Diablos stadium: Bicentennial Park in Azcapotzalco, next to the Refinería metro station and the Estadio Fray Nano, that would have been demolished in order to build the new stadium. The plans fell apart and the new stadium was not built.

The contract between the Diablos Rojos and Foro Sol was due after the 2014 season, that, and the return of the Formula One Mexican Grand Prix to the Autódromo Hermanos Rodríguez scheduled for 2015, meant that the Diablos had to, again, search for a new ballpark. In early 2014, plans for a new stadium were announced again, and this time four possible locations were considered: Bicentennial Park, Estadio Fray Nano, Ciudad Universitaria and the Magdalena Mixhuca Sports City. The latter was finally chosen and, on 2 December 2014, Alfredo Harp Helú announced that the construction of the new stadium would begin in 2015 between turns 1 and 3 of the Autódromo Hermanos Rodríguez. The conclusion of the project would mean the first professional stadium built after 50 years in Mexico City.

Diablos played their last game at the Foro Sol on 11 September 2014, that was also the last game of the Serie del Rey, the Mexican League championship series, defeating Pericos de Puebla to win the 2014 championship. For the next season, Diablos Rojos moved to the small, functional and familiar Estadio Fray Nano, where they played from 2015 to 2018.

The beginning of the project started from the promise of Alfredo Harp Helú, more than 20 years ago, focused on creating a permanent home for the fans and the institution itself; accomplishing not only his dream of having a stadium of their own for the Diablos, but also making real a promise based on the love and passion for baseball and Mexico.

=== Inauguration ===
The ballpark was inaugurated on 23 March 2019, with an exhibition game against the San Diego Padres. The inauguration was attended by President Andrés Manuel López Obrador and the Mayor Claudia Sheinbaum. The ceremony was the first time that the President of Mexico had thrown the first pitch in a baseball park since 1947, when Miguel Alemán did so in the 1947 season opener between the Diablos Rojos and the Azules de Veracruz. The starting pitchers were Arturo López for the Diablos and Ryan Weathers for the Padres. The San Diego Padres won the game by a score of 11–2.

The first official LMB game was the first of the inaugural series against the Tigres de Quintana Roo on 5 April 2019, won by the Diablos Rojos by a score of 14–8. The starting pitchers were Matt Gage for the Diablos Rojos and Javier Solano for the Tigres. Diablos first baseman Japhet Amador hit the first home run in an official game in the stadium's history.

On 10 December 2024, it was announced that the stadium would host the 2025 Baseball Champions League Americas from 8 to 13 April 2025. Diablos Rojos, winners of the 2024 Mexican League season, will play against the 2024 club champions of Cuba, Curaçao, Nicaragua, Puerto Rico and the American Association.

== Stadium firsts ==
Statistic	Exhibition	Regular season	Postseason
First game	23 March 2019; Padres 11, Diablos Rojos 2	5 April 2019; Diablos Rojos 14, Tigres 8	3 September 2019; Diablos Rojos 11, Tigres 6
Ceremonial First Pitch	Andrés Manuel López Obrador	Alfredo Harp Helú	Óscar Pérez
First pitch	Arturo López	Matt Gage	Matt Gage
First batter	Xavier Edwards (Padres)	Justin Greene (Tigres)	Rubén Sosa (Tigres)
First hit	Xavier Edwards (Padres)	Rubén Sosa (Tigres)	Reynaldo Rodríguez (Tigres)
First Diablos hit	Jesús Fabela	Japhet Amador	Japhet Amador
First home run	Michael Gettys (Padres)	Japhet Amador	Manuel Orduño (Tigres)

== MLB Mexico City Series ==
Estadio Alfredo Harp Helú hosts the MLB Mexico City Series. The first series, scheduled to be played in April 2020, were canceled due to the COVID-19 pandemic.

The series returned in 2023 with the San Diego Padres and the San Francisco Giants playing in Mexico City on 29 and 30 April 2023. The Padres won the first game, 16–11, and won the second, 6–4. The crowd was heavily biased towards the Padres, who are based very close to the Mexican border, and attracted fans from the U.S. and from across Mexico. Due to the high altitude and hitter-friendly dimensions of the stadium, the first game included 11 home runs from 10 different players, tying an MLB record.

The 2024 series featured the Houston Astros and the Colorado Rockies playing in Mexico City on 27 and 28 April 2024, with the Astros winning both games.

The 2026 series featured the San Diego Padres and the Arizona Diamondbacks playing in Mexico City on 25 and 26 April 2026. The Padres won the first game 6–3, but the Diamondbacks won the second game 12–7.

Season	Date	Winning Team		Losing Team		Attendance	Ref.
2023	29 April 2023	San Diego Padres	16	San Francisco Giants	11	19,633	
2023	30 April 2023	San Diego Padres	6	San Francisco Giants	4	19,611	
2024	27 April 2024	Houston Astros	12	Colorado Rockies	4	19,934	
2024	28 April 2024	Houston Astros	8	Colorado Rockies	2	19,841	
2026	25 April 2026	San Diego Padres	6	Arizona Diamondbacks	3	19,630	
2026	26 April 2026	Arizona Diamondbacks	12	San Diego Padres	7	19,671	
