= Tatsuro Matsumae =

Japanese politician (1927–2024)

- 松前達郎

Member of the House of Councillors
- In office 10 July 1977 – 22 July 2001
- Constituency: National district (1977–1983); National PR (1983–2001)

Personal details
- Born: 19 February 1927 Nagasaki Prefecture, Japan
- Died: 8 September 2024 (aged 97) Hachiōji, Tokyo, Japan
- Party: Democratic
- Other political affiliations: JSP (1977–1996); SDP (1996); DP (1996–1998)
- Education: Tohoku University
- Occupation: Academic

Tatsuro Matsumae (Japanese: 松前達郎 Matsumae Tatsurō; 19 February 1927 – 8 September 2024) was a Japanese academic and politician. A member of the Japan Socialist Party and the Democratic Party, he served in the House of Councillors from 1977 to 2001.

Matsumae died of pneumonia in Hachiōji, on 8 September 2024, at the age of 97.
