= Estadio Fray Nano =

Baseball stadium in Mexico City, Mexico

- Interactive map of Estadio Fray Nano
- Location: Mexico City, Mexico
- Coordinates: 19.4105286°N 99.1088247°W
- Capacity: 5,000
- Surface: Grass
- Field size: Left Field: 325 feet (99 m); Center Field: 410 feet (120 m); Right Field: 325 feet (99 m)

Construction
- Opened: 1957
- Expanded: 2014–2015

Tenant
- Diablos Rojos del México (2015–2018)

Estadio Fray Nano is a baseball stadium in Mexico City, Mexico. It was previously the home field of the Diablos Rojos del México baseball team, which competes in the Mexican League. It holds 5,200 spectators.

== History ==
Estadio Fray Nano was opened in 1957 and was mostly used for baseball events.

The stadium was reopened 2014 as the home of a minor circuit, the Liga Centropolitana. It was expanded later that year in anticipation of the move of Diablos Rojos from their previous home at Foro Sol. Estadio Fray Nano hosted its first Mexican league game in April 2015 as the new home field for the Diablos Rojos.

It is named for pioneering sports columnist Fray Nano.

In 2019, management of the stadium was returned to the government of Venustiano Carranza, the Mexico City borough in which it is located, as part of the broader administration of the Magdalena Mixhuca Sports City.
