= MLB Mexico City Series =

Major League Baseball series in Mexico City, Mexico

- Logo of the 2024 edition
- Played series: 2023–present
- Site: Estadio Alfredo Harp Helú; Mexico City, Mexico
- US television: MLB Network and MLB.TV
- Mexico television: ESPN Mexico and Fox (Mexico); Disney+ and Fox One (Streaming)

The MLB World Tour: Mexico City Series is a recurring series of Major League Baseball (MLB) games played at Estadio Alfredo Harp Helú in Mexico City. The first games played were between the San Diego Padres and San Francisco Giants during the 2023 season. The series is part of the MLB World Tour.

== Series ==
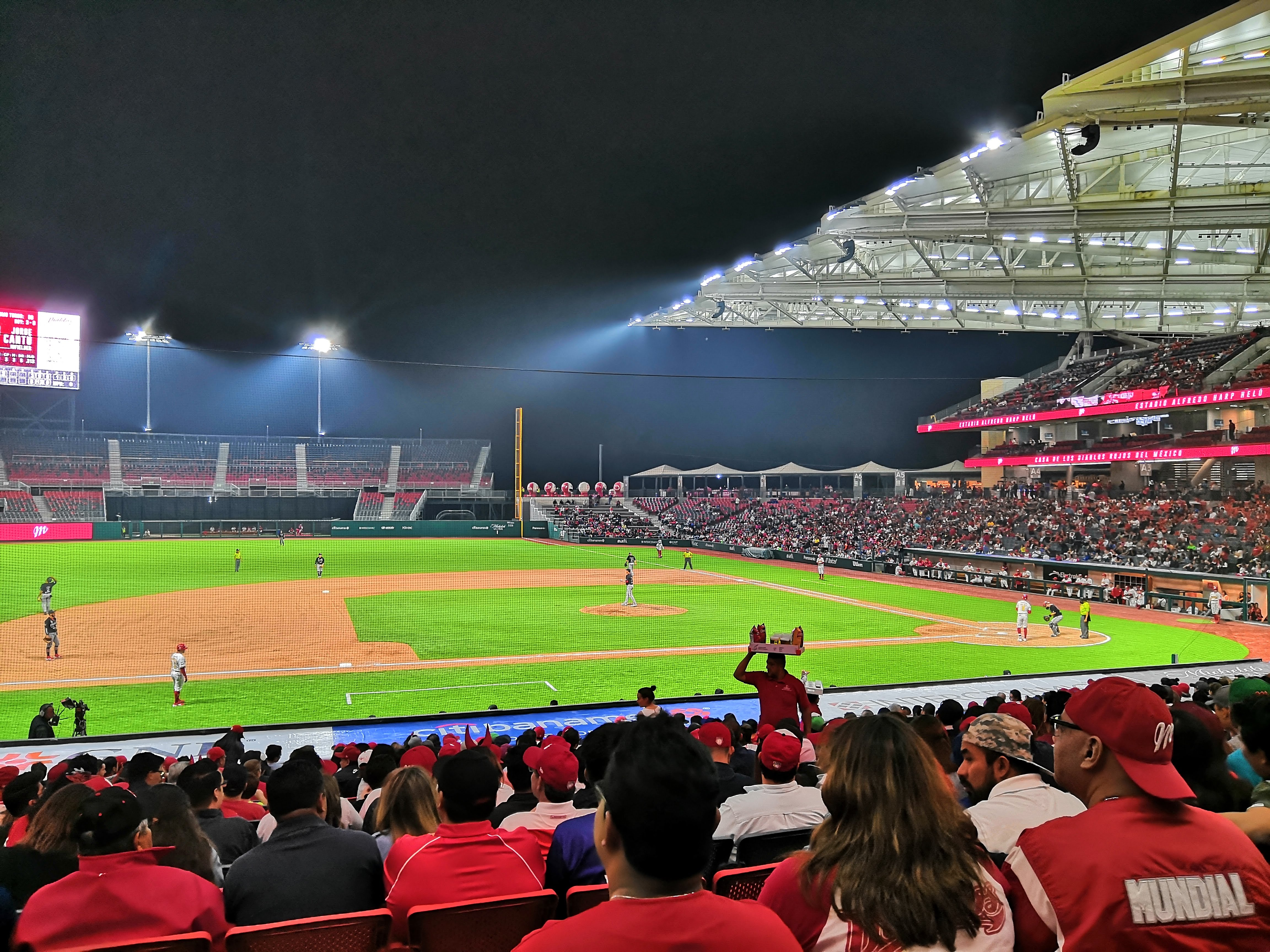
Estadio Alfredo Harp Helú

=== 2020 (canceled) ===
Major League Baseball (MLB) scheduled two games at Estadio Alfredo Harp Helú to be played on April 18–19, 2020, with the Arizona Diamondbacks hosting the San Diego Padres. MLB canceled this series on March 19, 2020, due to the COVID-19 pandemic.

=== 2023 ===
The first regular-season games to be played in Mexico City (Note: Several regular-season MLB games were previously played in Monterrey.) took place during the 2023 season on April 29–30, between the Padres and San Francisco Giants, as part of MLB World Tour (MLB games played outside of the United States and Canada). The Padres, the designated home team, won both games, by scores of 16–11 and 6–4. The crowd was heavily biased towards the Padres, who are based very close to the Mexican border, and attracted fans from the U.S. and from across Mexico. Due to the high altitude and hitter-friendly dimensions of the stadium, the first game included 11 home runs from 10 different players, tying an MLB record. On the Wednesday after the trip, Giants pitcher Logan Webb told reporters that he thought most of the Giants team returned from Mexico City with digestive ailments.

Television coverage was provided by MLB Network in the United States and ESPN Mexico in Mexico, with streaming via MLB.TV and Star+.

=== 2024 ===
For the 2024 season, MLB announced two games between the Houston Astros and Colorado Rockies, scheduled for April 27–28. Television coverage by Imagen Televisión and ESPN was planned for both games although only the first was aired for free in Mexico and only the latter was aired nationally in the United States. The Astros won both games, by scores of 12–4 and 8–2.

=== 2026 ===
For the 2026 season, MLB announced two games between the Arizona Diamondbacks and San Diego Padres, scheduled for April 25–26. Television coverage from Fox, Fox One (Saturday), ESPN, and Disney+ in Mexico was planned. The Padres won the first game by a score of 6–4 and the Diamondbacks won the second game by a score of 12–7.

== See also ==
- List of Major League Baseball games played outside the United States and Canada
